= Football at the 2015 SEA Games – Group A =

== Standings ==
Pos	Team	Pld	W	D	L	GF	GA	GD	Pts	Qualification
1	Myanmar	4	3	1	0	14	7	+7	10	Semi-finals
2	Indonesia	4	3	0	1	11	5	+6	9	Semi-finals
3	Singapore (H)	4	2	0	2	5	4	+1	6	
4	Cambodia	4	1	1	2	8	13	−5	4	
5	Philippines	4	0	0	4	2	11	−9	0	

Source: Seagames 2015
Rules for classification: 1) Points; 2) Goal difference; 3) Goals scored
(H) Hosts

== Philippines vs Singapore ==
The anticipated first game of the SEA Games saw Singapore dominate but also wasting numerous good chances, many of which were aimed straight at Florencio Badelic Jr.'s goal. In the 31st minute, the Lions had the ball in the back of the net following a free kick, but it was called off as Shakir Hamzah was adjudged to have impeded Badelic in the process. Singapore were unlucky again six minutes later as Sahil Suhaimi was through on goal but his effort rebounded off the post with the slightest of touches from the Filipino custodian. The Philippines had a few chances, mostly created by their tricky wingers Bugas and Salenga. In the fifteenth minute the former's cross found captain Gerardo Valmayor, but despite being completely unmarked he could not direct his header on target. On the stroke of half-time Singapore finally made their dominance pay off through another free-kick as Faris Ramli's fine cross was met by the head of unmarked Sheikh Abdul Hadi's whose effort was beyond the reach of the goalkeeper and the defenders on the line. After Santos of the Philippines missed a good chance Singapore missed an even better one in the 64th minute, after some great passing Sahil was again right in front of goal unmarked but somehow managed to drag his effort horribly wide. The match was very physical and at time was marred by some overzealous challenges, mostly from the Filipinos, although some of Singapore's players were not innocent either. In one particular incident in the 82nd minute, Kennedy Uzoka unintentionally bundled Shakir over, only for the latter to kick out. Uzoka responded by stepping over Shakir, while the defender pretended to be hit in the face. Uzoka received a yellow card although some analysers thought both players should have been sent off.

1 June
20:30

Philippines	0–1	Singapore
		Abdul Hadi 45'

Jalan Besar Stadium, Kallang
Referee: Hiroyuki Kimura (Japan)

GK	1	Florencio Badelic Jr.
RB	27	Shirmar Felongco	(yellow card) 39'
CB	22	Francisco Santos
CB	3	Neil Dorimon
LB	5	Julian Clariño
CM	9	Paolo Bugas
CM	4	Fitch Arboleda		(substituted off) 65'
CM	7	Arnel Amita
RF	17	Jaime Cheng		(substituted off) 38'
CF	19	Paolo Salenga
LF	29	Gerardo Valmayor (c)	(yellow card) 42'
Substitutions:
MF	8	Daniel Gadia		(substituted in) 38'	(substituted off) 79'
MF	6	Nathaniel Alquiros		(substituted in) 65'
FW	20	Kennedy Uzoka	(yellow card) 82'	(substituted in) 79'
Coach:
(Philippines) Marlon Maro

GK	24	Syazwan Buhari
DF	2	Shakir Hamzah
DF	15	Sheikh Abdul Hadi
DF	18	Al-Qaasimy Rahman (c)
MF	5	Adam Swandi
MF	6	Anumanthan Kumar
MF	28	Safirul Sulaiman
MF	19	Stanely Ng	(substituted off) 66'
MF	10	Faris Ramli
FW	8	Shamil Sharif	(substituted off) 36'
FW	7	Sahil Suhaimi	(substituted off) 85'
Substitutions:
DF	17	Irfan Fandi	(substituted in) 36'
FW	9	Amy Recha	(substituted in) 66'
MF	23	Suria Prakash	(substituted in) 85'
Coach:
(Singapore) Aide Iskandar

Assistant referees:
Mohammad Reza Mansouri (Iran)
Mo'ud Bonyadifard (Iran)
Fourth official:
Awni Abdel Karim Said Hassouneh (Jordan)

== Myanmar vs Indonesia ==
Myanmar opened the scoring in this encounter in the 21st minute; Kaung Sat Naing lost the ball in the box then it fell kindly to Shine Thura who slotted the ball for the opening goal. They would double their lead seventeen minutes later, as Muhammad Natshir found Nay Lin Tun's free kick too powerful to handle and palmed it right to Sithu Aung, who headed in from barely a yard out. Indonesia created very few chances despite equal amounts of ball possession but nonetheless pulled a goal back just seconds before the half-time whistle as Abduh Lestaluhu's audacious effort from an acute angle found the back of the net via the underside of the crossbar. The goal did little to dampen the Burmese who scored nine minutes after the restart as Hansamu Yama lost the ball to Sithu right outside the penalty box and the latter chipped Natshir who was off the goal-line for his second of the match and his team's third. Myanmar would then further extend their lead in the 64th minute in similar circumstances to their first as the Indonesian defence once again could deal with Nay's free kick and the ball fell right to Kyaw Zin Lwin who scored. With six minutes later and twenty to go Indonesia took advantage of some slack Burmese marking as Ahmad Noviandani got away from the defender to slot the ball at the goalkeepers near post. That would be the end of the scoring in an opening and entertaining game.

2 June
20:30

Myanmar	4–2	Indonesia
Shine Thura 21'; Sithu Aung 38', 54'; Kyaw Zin Lwin 66'	Report^{[usurped]}	Abduh 45+2'; Dani 70'

Jalan Besar Stadium, Kallang
Referee: Kim Hee-gon (South Korea)

GK	1	Kyaw Zin Phyo
RB	26	Ye Win Aung	(substituted off) 60'
CB	29	Win Zin Oo
CB	14	Phyo Ko Ko Thein
LB	15	Hein Thiha Zaw
RM	9	Kaung Sat Naing
CM	6	Hlaing Bo Bo
CM	8	Nay Lin Tun (c)	(substituted off) 87'
LM	5	Sithu Aung
AM	21	Ye Ko Oo
CF	20	Shine Thura	(substituted off) 70'
Substitutions:
DF	12	Kyaw Zin Lwin	(substituted in) 60'
FW	22	Thiha Zaw	(substituted in) 70'
MF	7	Aung Show Thar Maung	(substituted in) 87'
Coach:
(Myanmar) Kyi Lwin

GK	12	Muhammad Natshir
RB	13	Manahati Lestusen (c)
CB	4	Syaiful Cahya
CB	16	Hansamu Yama
LB	19	Zulfiandi		(substituted off) 63'
RM	7	Ahmad Noviandani		(substituted off) 86'
CM	6	Evan Dimas	(yellow card) 26'
CM	18	Adam Alis
LM	10	Wawan Febrianto		(substituted off) 69'
SS	3	Abduh Lestaluhu	(yellow card) 84'
CF	9	Muchlis Hadi
Substitutions:
FW	11	Yandi Munawar		(substituted in) 63'
FW	20	Ilham Armaiyn		(substituted in) 69'
MF	17	Paulo Sitanggang		(substituted in) 86'
Coach:
(Indonesia) Aji Santoso

Assistant referees:
Park Sang-jun (South Korea)
Ahmed Ferdous (Bangladesh)
Fourth official:
Ma Ning (China)

== Cambodia vs Philippines ==
Cambodia opened the scoring in the 30th minute, when a sliding challenge from a Filipino defender took the ball away from Keo Sokpheng, but it fell right to Prak Mony Udom, and the Cambodian captain unleashed a powerful shot through the goalkeeper's near post. Four minutes later, the Koupreys' lead was doubled as Tith Dina did well to let Sos Suhana's pass go by and it came tight to Sokpheng, his initial shot was cleared off the line by Ronnie Aguisanda, but Sokpheng was on hand to smash the ball home at the second time of asking. Seven minutes into the second half, the Philippines pulled a goal back, when Kennedy Uzoka muscled off the defender marking him and crossed the ball for Paolo Salenga to slot the ball in. There was some controversy in the 65th minute as Ngoy Srin had a goal wrongly disallowed for offsides, but nine minutes from time Cambodia did restore their two-goal lead with Chan Vathanaka calmly slotting home. The match ended on a sour note as frustration showed for Arnel Amita who revived a second yellow card for kicking the ball away after he had committed a foul.

3 June
20:30

Cambodia	3–1	Philippines
Udom 30'; Sokpheng 41'; Vathanaka 81'	Report^{[usurped]}	Salenga 53'

Jalan Besar Stadium, Kallang
Referee: Mo'ud Bonyadifard (Iran)

GK	1	Um Sereyroth
CB	4	Nub Tola		(substituted off) 62'
CB	16	Ngoy Srin
CB	5	Soeuy Visal
CM	3	Nen Sothearoth
CM	14	Tith Dina
CM	8	Hoy Phallin		(substituted off) 67'
RW	17	Chhin Chhoeun
AM	12	Sos Suhana
LW	7	Prak Mony Udom (c)
CF	20	Keo Sokpheng	(yellow card) 55'	(substituted off) 77'
Substitutions:
DF	2	Sok Sovan		(substituted in) 62'
MF	13	Ol Ravy		(substituted in) 67'
FW	11	Chan Vathanaka		(substituted in) 77'
Coach:
(South Korea) Lee Tae-hoon

GK	1	Florencio Badelic Jr. (c)
CB	27	Shirmar Felongco
CB	22	Francisco Santos		(substituted off) 32'
CB	5	Julian Clariño	(yellow card) 59'	(substituted off) 84'
RM	9	Paolo Bugas
CM	6	Nathaniel Alquiros
CM	4	Fitch Arboleda
CM	15	Richard Talaroc
LM	28	Ronnie Aguisanda	(yellow card) 48'
CF	20	Kennedy Uzoka		(substituted off) 74'
CF	19	Paolo Salenga
Substitutions:
MF	7	Arnel Amita	(yellow card) 50' (yellow-red card) 90+2'	(substituted in) 32'
MF	8	Daniel Gadia		(substituted in) 74'
DF	2	Mark Besaña		(substituted in) 84'
Coach:
(Philippines) Marlon Maro

Assistant referees:
Mohammad Reza Mansouri (Iran)
Alisher Usmanov (Uzbekistan)
Fourth official:
Aziz Asimov (Uzbekistan)

== Singapore vs Myanmar ==
Myanmar started strongly and pegged Singapore back with their high pressing game. In the 24th minute, Zon Moe Aung's free kick found captain Nay Lin Tun completely unmarked and he tapped the ball in from close range to open the scoring. Singapore would equalise only ten minutes later though as Phyo Ko Ko Thein was adjudged to have handled the ball in the box. Faris Ramli was given the responsibility of taking the penalty kick and made no mistake, even though Burmese goalkeeper Kyaw Zin Phyo dived the right way he could get nowhere near Faris' shot. Two minutes later Adam Swandi got away from his defender but despite being unmarked Stanely Ng could not connect with his cross. Although Singapore would boss the game from then on in possession and chances it was Myanmar who would get the game winner as on the hour mark Ye Ko Oo's long range free-kick was well struck, although Singaporean goalkeeper Syazwan Buhari seemed to be fooled by an awkward bounce the ball took. Singaporean substitute Irfan Fandi did score in the 77th minute but it was disallowed for a foul by Irfan on the Burmese goaltender in the buildup. Once again Singaporean star forward Sahil Suhaimi had a poor game, missing many clear-cut chances. Myanmar held on to record a second straight win.

4 June
20:30

Singapore	1–2	Myanmar
Faris 34' (pen.)		Nay Lin Tun 24'; Ye Ko Oo 60'

Jalan Besar Stadium, Kallang
Referee: Yousef Al-Marzouq (Kuwait)

GK	24	Syazwan Buhari
DF	2	Shakir Hamzah	(yellow card) 26'
DF	15	Sheikh Abdul Hadi
DF	18	Al-Qaasimy Rahman (c)
MF	5	Adam Swandi
MF	6	Anumanthan Kumar
MF	12	Pravin Gunasagaran	(yellow card) 59'
MF	28	Safirul Sulaiman		(substituted off) 69'
MF	19	Stanely Ng		(substituted off) 58'
MF	10	Faris Ramli		(substituted off) 88'
FW	7	Sahil Suhaimi
Substitutions:
DF	17	Irfan Fandi		(substituted in) 58'
MF	23	Suria Prakash		(substituted in) 69'
FW	9	Amy Recha		(substituted in) 88'
Coach:
(Singapore) Aide Iskandar

GK	1	Kyaw Zin Phyo	(yellow card) 68'
RB	12	Kyaw Zin Lwin		(substituted off) 67'
CB	29	Win Zin Oo		(substituted off) 82'
CB	14	Phyo Ko Ko Thein
LB	5	Sithu Aung
CM	6	Hlaing Bo Bo
CM	8	Nay Lin Tun (c)
RW	9	Kaung Sat Naing
AM	21	Ye Ko Oo
LW	17	Zon Moe Aung		(substituted off) 58'
CF	20	Shine Thura
Substitutions:
FW	22	Thiha Zaw		(substituted in) 58'
DF	26	Ye Win Aung	(yellow card) 83'	(substituted in) 67'
DF	13	Ko Ko Hein		(substituted in) 82'
Coach:
(Myanmar) Kyi Lwin

Assistant referees:
Ghulam Abbas (Kuwait)
Mohammed Al-Abakry (Saudi Arabia)
Fourth official:
Turki Al-Khudair (Saudi Arabia)

== Indonesia vs Cambodia ==
Indonesia opened the scoring in the 12th minute, with Adam Alis assisting Muchlis Hadi. They would then double their advantage as Ahmad Noviandani latched onto a long pass seven minutes before the break and powered a shot past the Cambodian goalkeeper who was hesitant to come off his line. Cambodia would pull one back as Syaiful Cahya's heavy challenge on Ngoy Srin resulted in a penalty kick which his captain Prak Mony Udom made no mistake to score from. Cambodia dominated for a few moments but it was Indonesia who scored the next goal in the 68th minute as Muchilis took advantage of some lax defending, and he would grab his hat-trick six minutes later as Evan Dimas' powerful shot from outside the area rebounded off the post but fell perfectly for Muchilis who only had to head the ball into the unguarded net. Indonesia were not done there as five minutes from time Muchilis and substitute Wawan Febrianto exchanged some neat passes with the latter scoring, and then in stoppage time Febrianto passed for Evan who scored himself to complete the 5–1 win.

6 June
20:30

Indonesia	6–1	Cambodia
Muchlis 12', 68', 74'; Dani 37'; Wawan 85'; Evan 90+3'	Report^{[usurped]}	Udom 56' (pen.)

Jalan Besar Stadium, Kallang
Referee: Turki Al-Khudair (Saudi Arabia)

GK	1	Teguh Amiruddin
RB	13	Manahati Lestusen (c)
CB	4	Syaiful Cahya	(yellow card) 55'
CB	15	Agung Prasetyo	(yellow card) 39'
LB	19	Zulfiandi
CM	6	Evan Dimas
CM	17	Paulo Sitanggang		(substituted off) 60'
CM	18	Adam Alis
RF	7	Ahmad Noviandani		(substituted off) 75'
CF	9	Muchlis Hadi		(substituted off) 88'
LF	3	Abduh Lestaluhu
Substitutions:
FW	10	Wawan Febrianto		(substituted in) 60'
FW	20	Ilham Armaiyn		(substituted in) 75'
DF	16	Hansamu Yama		(substituted in) 88'
Coach:
(Indonesia) Aji Santoso

GK	1	Um Sereyroth
RB	6	Samoeun Pidor		(substituted off) 21'
CB	16	Ngoy Srin	(yellow card) 90+2'
CB	5	Soeuy Visal
LB	8	Hoy Phallin
RM	3	Nen Sothearoth
CM	14	Tith Dina		(substituted off) 54'
LM	7	Prak Mony Udom (c)
AM	17	Chhin Chhoeun
AM	12	Sos Suhana
CF	10	Keo Sokpheng		(substituted off) 62'
Substitutions:
DF	2	Sok Sovan		(substituted in) 21'
MF	15	Sok Chanraksmey	(yellow card) 78'	(substituted in) 67'
FW	11	Chan Vathanaka		(substituted in) 62'
Coach:
(South Korea) Lee Tae-hoon

Assistant referees:
Mohammed Al-Abakry (Saudi Arabia)
Satoshi Karakami (Japan)
Fourth official:
Hiroyuki Kimura (Japan)

== Philippines vs Myanmar ==
Myanmar secured their progression out of the group while at the same time eliminating the Philippines from any advancement in a free scoring win, although it was the latter who opened the scoring. In the early stages, Shine Thura missed the target when one-on-one with the goalkeeper, before Filipino captain Shirmar Felongco won possession in the middle of the field and surged forward and unleashed a precise shot from outside the area that gave the Philippines the lead. Four minutes later, Myanmar's captain Nay Lin Tun scored the equaliser as his free kick deflected off a Filipino defender and into the net. The Burmese continued to dominate the remainder of the game and although they missed many good chances in the first half, they would take the lead just seconds after the restart as Shine picked up Lin Tun's through ball to score at the near post. In the 62nd minute, Ye Win Aung took advantage of some poor defending to tap in Hlaing Bo Bo's corner into an unguarded net. Another Filipino mistake led to Myanmar's fourth goal seven minutes later, as Nathanael Villanueva completely misjudged Ye Ko Oo's pass, allowing Sithu Aung to slot into an empty goal. The Burmese would grab a fifth in stoppage time, when Kyaw Zin Lwin rifled Kaung Sat Naing's pass into the top corner.

7 June
20:30

Philippines	1–5	Myanmar
Felongco 17'	Report^{[usurped]}	Nay Lin Tun 21'; Shine Thura 46'; Ye Win Aung 62'; Sithu Aung 69'; Kyaw Zin Lwin 90+1'

Jalan Besar Stadium, Kallang
Referee: Khamis Al-Kuwari (Qatar)

GK	25	Nathanael Villanueva
CB	27	Shirmar Felongco (c)
CB	14	Dominic del Rosario
CB	5	Julian Clariño
RM	9	Paolo Bugas
CM	6	Nathaniel Alquiros
CM	15	Richard Talaroc		(substituted off) 65'
LM	28	Ronnie Aguisanda		(substituted off) 75'
RF	17	Jaime Cheng		(substituted off) 43'
CF	19	Paolo Salenga	(yellow card) 64'
LF	11	Connor Tacagni
Substitutions:
MF	4	Fitch Arboleda		(substituted in) 43'
DF	3	Neil Dorimon		(substituted in) 65'
FW	20	Kennedy Uzoka		(substituted in) 75'
Coach:
(Philippines) Marlon Maro

GK	1	Kyaw Zin Phyo
RB	26	Ye Win Aung
CB	12	Kyaw Zin Lwin
CB	14	Phyo Ko Ko Thein	(substituted off) 77'
LB	15	Hein Thiha Zaw
RM	9	Kaung Sat Naing
CM	6	Hlaing Bo Bo	(substituted off) 69'
CM	8	Nay Lin Tun (c)	(substituted off) 56'
LM	5	Sithu Aung
AM	21	Ye Ko Oo
CF	20	Shine Thura
Substitutions:
FW	22	Thiha Zaw	(substituted in) 56'
MF	7	Aung Show Thar Maung	(substituted in) 69'
DF	13	Ko Ko Hein	(substituted in) 77'
Coach:
(Myanmar) Kyi Lwin

Assistant referees:
Saoud Ahmed Al-Maqaleh (Qatar)
Jeffrey Goh Gek Pheng (Singapore)
Fourth official:
Turki Al-Khudair (Saudi Arabia)

== Cambodia vs Singapore ==
Cambodia dominated the opening stages of the game and created many good opportunities. They probably should have had a penalty too in the 30th minute when Prak Mony Udom was tripped by Shakir Hamzah in the box, but the referee waved play on. Singapore scored twice in the dying moments of the half though as first Safirul Sulaiman curled in a great free-kick in the 44th minute after Sahil Suhaimi was fouled just outside the box, and a minute later Irfan Fandi chipped the ball over the advancing goalkeeper allowing Faris Ramli to head into an empty goal. Cambodia would pull one back as Chhin Chhoeun showed some quick feet to make room as he crossed the ball for the unmarked Chan Vathanaka who headed in. The match turned physical and 9 yellow cards were shown as both teams went for the win, but it was Singapore who got the final goal, as in the dying moments as from a swift counterattack the ball was booted upfield to send Sahil Suhaimi one-on-one with Um Sereyroth, and the Singaporean forward confidently slotted past the Cambodian goaltender to score his first goal of the tournament.

8 June
20:30

Cambodia	1–3	Singapore
Vathanaka 57'	Report^{[usurped]}	Safirul 45+1'; Faris 45+2'; Sahil 90'

Jalan Besar Stadium, Kallang
Referee: Ma Ning (China)

GK	1	Um Sereyroth
RB	6	Samoeun Pidor
CB	2	Sok Sovan
CB	5	Soeuy Visal	(yellow card) 90+2'
LB	3	Nen Sothearoth	(yellow card) 81'
CM	13	Ol Ravy		(substituted off) 55'
CM	15	Sok Chanraksmey		(substituted off) 50'
RW	17	Chhin Chhoeun
AM	12	Sos Suhana
LW	7	Prak Mony Udom (c)		(substituted off) 78'
CF	20	Phanny Y Ratha
Substitutions:
FW	11	Chan Vathanaka	(yellow card) 61'	(substituted in) 50'
FW	8	Hoy Phallin		(substituted in) 55'
FW	10	Keo Sokpheng		(substituted in) 78'
Coach:
(South Korea) Lee Tae-hoon

GK	24	Syazwan Buhari	(yellow card) 90+6'
DF	2	Shakir Hamzah	(yellow card) 45'
DF	15	Sheikh Abdul Hadi
DF	18	Al-Qaasimy Rahman (c)	(yellow card) 79'
MF	5	Adam Swandi	(yellow card) 52'
MF	6	Anumanthan Kumar	(yellow card) 56'
MF	12	Pravin Gunasagaran		(substituted off) 85'
MF	28	Safirul Sulaiman
MF	10	Faris Ramli		(substituted off) 68'
FW	17	Irfan Fandi		(substituted off) 54'
FW	7	Sahil Suhaimi
Substitutions:
DF	13	Ho Wai Loon		(substituted in) 54'
FW	9	Amy Recha	(yellow card) 90+5'	(substituted in) 68'
FW	8	Shamil Sharif		(substituted in) 85'
Coach:
(Singapore) Aide Iskandar

Assistant referees:
Saoud Ahmed Al-Maqaleh (Qatar)
Ahmed Ferdous (Bangladesh)
Fourth official:
Khamis Al-Kuwari (Qatar)

== Indonesia vs Philippines ==
Already eliminated and playing in what was their last game at the Games, the Philippines gave a much improved performance although they often lacked the finishing touch. Evan Dimas, playing as captain for the night, capitalized on the first chance of the game in only the fourth minute as he latched on to a long pass and lobbed the ball over Florencio Badelic Jr. and the defender on the line from an acute angle to give Indonesia the lead. Indonesia was not finished, however, as 9 minutes later, Paulo Sitanggang's excellent dribble found Evan again who smashed the ball in for his and his team's second. Philippines had an excellent chance to pull one back in the 43rd minute as Daniel Gadia's through ball found Gerardo Valmayor completely unmarked but the Filipino striker could only muster a tame shot straight at Indonesian keeper Teguh Amiruddin. A scramble in the box in the 50th minute resulted in Julian Clariño having to clear off the line. That was the last serious chance of the game as both teams slowed the tempo and resorted to off-target shooting from long range, Paolo Salenga scuffing a headed attempt in the first minute of injury time.

9 June
20:30

Indonesia	2–0	Philippines
Evan 4', 13'	Report^{[usurped]}

Jalan Besar Stadium, Kallang
Referee: Aziz Asimov (Uzbekistan)

GK	1	Teguh Amiruddin
RB	2	Vava Mario Yagalo
CB	15	Agung Prasetyo
CB	19	Zulfiandi	(yellow card) 82'
LB	16	Hansamu Yama
CM	6	Evan Dimas (c)		(substituted off) 63'
CM	17	Paulo Sitanggang	(yellow card) 45+2'
CM	18	Adam Alis		(substituted off) 67'
RF	7	Ahmad Noviandani		(substituted off) 73'
CF	9	Muchlis Hadi
LF	3	Abduh Lestaluhu
Substitutions:
FW	10	Wawan Febrianto		(substituted in) 63'
MF	8	Muhammad Hargianto		(substituted in) 67'
FW	20	Ilham Armaiyn		(substituted in) 73'
Coach:
(Indonesia) Aji Santoso

GK	1	Florencio Badelic Jr.
CB	2	Mark Besaña		(substituted off) 20'
CB	8	Daniel Gadia
CB	3	Neil Dorimon
RWB	27	Shirmar Felongco	(yellow card) 45+1'
LWB	5	Julian Clariño
CM	6	Nathaniel Alquiros
CM	4	Fitch Arboleda (c)
CM	7	Arnel Amita
CF	17	Jaime Cheng		(substituted off) 43'
CF	29	Gerardo Valmayor		(substituted off) 63'
Substitutions:
MF	28	Ronnie Aguisanda		(substituted in) 20'
FW	19	Paolo Salenga		(substituted in) 43'
MF	9	Paolo Bugas		(substituted in) 63'
Coach:
(Philippines) Marlon Maro

Assistant referees:
Alisher Usmanov (Uzbekistan)
Saoud Ahmed Al-Maqaleh (Qatar)
Fourth official:
Khamis Al-Kuwari (Qatar)

== Myanmar vs Cambodia ==
Myanmar came into this match already assured to move on, and only needed a point to claim top spot. Cambodia, on the other hand, had to win by a massive margin and hope other results went their way to have any chance of progressing. That slim chance was boosted in the 26th minute as Tith Dina's corner was parried away by stand-in goaltender Aung Wai Phyo. but it came straight back to Keo Sokpheng who blasted in from close range. In first-half stoppage time Chan Vathanaka was fouled by Phyo Ko Ko Thein resulting in a penalty kick. Vathanaka was given the responsibility, but Aung dived to his right to save the shot, however in his despair to claim the rebound he ended up fouling Vathanaka again and much to the shock of the Burmese the referee awarded another penalty-kick. Undeterred Vathanaka took the kick again, and even though both he and goalkeeper went the same way as before his shot was out of Aung's reach. Myanmar would pull one back in the 55th minute as from a short corner combination Thiha Zaw got in front of his defender to bundle in. Just two minutes later, however, Sokpheng scored his second as he headed in Vathanaka's cross to restore Cambodia's two-goal lead. A minute from time Hlaing Bo Bo's clever pass found fellow substitute Kaung Sat Naing who shot past goalkeeper Um Sereyroth, and then in stoppage time it was Kaung's turn to go from scorer to provider as his ball across the face of goal was met by yet another substitute Sithu Aung who scored easily to tie the game and assure Myanmar would finish top of the group.

10 June
20:30

Myanmar	3–3	Cambodia
Thiha Zaw 53'; Kaung Sat Naing 89'; Sithu Aung 90+1'	Report^{[usurped]}	Sokpheng 26', 55'; Vathanaka 45+5' (pen.)

Jalan Besar Stadium, Kallang
Referee: Hiroyuki Kimura (Japan)

GK	30	Aung Wai Phyo
RB	26	Ye Win Aung (c)	(yellow card) 10'
CB	12	Kyaw Zin Lwin
CB	27	Thein Naing Oo	(yellow card) 45+5'
LB	22	Thiha Zaw		(substituted off) 71'
DM	14	Phyo Ko Ko Thein
RM	7	Aung Show Thar Maung
LM	17	Zon Moe Aung		(substituted off) 55'
AM	21	Ye Ko Oo
CF	11	Aung Kyaw Naing		(substituted off) 50'
CF	20	Shine Thura
Substitutions:
FW	9	Kaung Sat Naing		(substituted in) 50'
MF	5	Sithu Aung		(substituted in) 55'
MF	6	Hlaing Bo Bo		(substituted in) 71'
Coach:
(Myanmar) Kyi Lwin

GK	1	Um Sereyroth
CB	2	Sok Sovan
CB	16	Ngoy Srin	(substituted off) 76'
CB	5	Soeuy Visal
CM	3	Nen Sothearoth
CM	14	Tith Dina	(substituted off) 86'
CM	8	Hoy Phallin
RW	17	Chhin Chhoeun (c)
AM	12	Sos Suhana
LW	11	Chan Vathanaka
CF	10	Keo Sokpheng
Substitutions:
DF	6	Samoeun Pidor	(substituted in) 76'
MF	13	Ol Ravy	(substituted in) 86'
Coach:
(South Korea) Lee Tae-hoon

Assistant referees:
Satoshi Karakami (Japan)
Park Sang-jun (South Korea)
Fourth official:
Kim Hee-gon (South Korea)

== Singapore vs Indonesia ==
The situation of this match was simple: the winner of this match would go through to the knockout stage, although Indonesia could afford a draw with their superior goal differential coming in. The importance of the match was clearly evident as even early on both teams played determined but also physical, within the first ten minutes three yellow cards had already been issued. In the 28th minute Paulo Sitanggang's cross caught Singaporean goalkeeper Syazwan Buhari out of possession but Evan Dimas failed to control the ball. Evan had been identified by most observers as the Indonesian danger man and ten minutes later, his neat one-two with Ahmad Noviandani and the latter's strong shot forcing Syazwan into a save at his near post. Needing to win the game Aide Iskandar made an attacking substitution at half-time with Irfan Fandi and Faris Ramli coming on. It was Indonesia though that took the lead barely two minutes after the break as Muchlis Hadi's run and cross was missed by a couple Singaporean and Indonesian players but fell right to Evan outside the box, and his shot was perfectly placed in the top corner leaving Syazwan grounded. Singapore had the perfect change to equalise just seconds later as Faris's cross was right to the totally unmarked Sahil Suhaimi yet the forward's header was straight at Teguh Amiruddin. Adam Alis's long range shots troubled Singapore all night, and they had several good chances to double their lead latter in the second half as Syazwan had to dive to keep out Syaiful Cahya's free kick, and then the Singaporean goalkeeper frustrated Indonesia again after Noviandani's effort at the far post was tipped around for a corner after Sitanggang's excellent defence-splitting pass. Whatever slim hopes Singapore had of winning the match became even slimmer as defender Ho Wai Loon was sent off for a second bookable offence as his late challenge from behind on Evan earned him a second yellow card and subsequent red. Despite their man advantage Indonesia actually sat back a bit, Anumanthan Kumar and Pravin Gunasagaran had dangerous long range shots but their opponents hung on comfortably for the win. Four Singaporean players were cautioned in the last twenty minutes. Immediately after the game Aide Iskandar resigned after the host's rather disappointing tournament.

11 June
20:30

Singapore	0–1	Indonesia
	Report^{[usurped]}	Evan 47'

Jalan Besar Stadium, Kallang
Referee: Kim Hee-gon (South Korea)

GK	24	Syazwan Buhari
DF	13	Ho Wai Loon	(yellow card) 20' (yellow-red card) 65'
DF	15	Sheikh Abdul Hadi	(yellow card) 7'
DF	18	Al-Qaasimy Rahman (c)
MF	5	Adam Swandi
MF	6	Anumanthan Kumar	(yellow card) 90+5'
MF	12	Pravin Gunasagaran	(yellow card) 90+4'
MF	28	Safirul Sulaiman
MF	19	Stanely Ng		(substituted off) 46'
FW	9	Amy Recha		(substituted off) 46'
FW	7	Sahil Suhaimi		(substituted off) 70'
Substitutions:
DF	17	Irfan Fandi	(yellow card) 74'	(substituted in) 46'
FW	10	Faris Ramli	(yellow card) 70'	(substituted in) 46'
MF	23	Suria Prakash		(substituted in) 70'
Coach:
(Singapore) Aide Iskandar

GK	1	Teguh Amiruddin
RB	13	Manahati Lestusen (c)	(yellow card) 52'
CB	4	Syaiful Cahya
CB	15	Agung Prasetyo	(yellow card) 9'
LB	19	Zulfiandi
CM	6	Evan Dimas
CM	17	Paulo Sitanggang		(substituted off) 67'
CM	18	Adam Alis
RF	7	Ahmad Noviandani		(substituted off) 89'
CF	9	Muchlis Hadi	(yellow card) 7'
LF	3	Abduh Lestaluhu	(yellow card) 68'	(substituted off) 71'
Substitutions:
DF	16	Hansamu Yama		(substituted in) 67'
DF	2	Vava Mario Yagalo		(substituted in) 71'
MF	8	Muhammad Hargianto		(substituted in) 89'
Coach:
(Indonesia) Aji Santoso

Assistant referees:
Park Sang-jun (South Korea)
Mohammed Al-Abakry (Saudi Arabia)
Fourth official:
Turki Al-Khudair (Saudi Arabia)
