= Football at the 2015 SEA Games – Knockout stage =

== Qualified teams ==
Group	Winners	Runners-up
A	Myanmar	Indonesia
B	Thailand	Vietnam

== Bracket ==
Semi-finals
13 June – Kallang, Singapore
Myanmar	2
Vietnam	1
13 June – Kallang, Singapore
Thailand	5
Indonesia	0

Gold medal match
15 June – Kallang, Singapore
Myanmar	0
Thailand	3
Bronze medal match
15 June – Kallang, Singapore
Vietnam	5
Indonesia	0

== Semi-finals ==
=== Myanmar vs Vietnam ===
13 June
14:00

Myanmar	2–1	Vietnam
Sithu Aung 39' (pen.); Nay Lin Tun 80'	Report^{[usurped]}	Võ Huy Toàn 72'

National Stadium, Kallang
Referee: Turki Al-Khudair (Saudi Arabia)

GK	1	Kyaw Zin Phyo	(yellow card) 90+5'
DF	14	Phyo Ko Ko Thein
DF	15	Hein Thiha Zaw	(yellow card) 18'
DF	12	Kyaw Zin Lwin
DF	27	Thein Naing Oo	(yellow card) 79'	(substituted off) 82'
MF	5	Sithu Aung		(substituted off) 77'
MF	6	Hlaing Bo Bo		(substituted off) 90'
MF	21	Ye Ko Oo
MF	8	Nay Lin Tun (c)
FW	9	Kaung Sat Naing	(yellow card) 90+4'
FW	20	Shine Thura	(yellow card) 90+1'
Substitutions:
MF	17	Zon Moe Aung		(substituted in) 77'
DF	13	Ko Ko Hein		(substituted in) 82'
MF	19	Chit Su Moe		(substituted in) 90'
Coach:
(Myanmar) Kyi Lwin

GK	27	Phí Minh Long
DF	6	Nguyễn Minh Tùng
DF	26	Bùi Tiến Dũng
DF	15	Quế Ngọc Hải (c)
DF	22	Nguyễn Thanh Hiền
MF	14	Nguyễn Huy Hùng
MF	11	Đỗ Duy Mạnh		(substituted off) 46'
MF	25	Võ Huy Toàn		(substituted off) 81'
MF	18	Hồ Ngọc Thắng	(yellow card) 38'	(substituted off) 90+3'
FW	17	Mạc Hồng Quân
FW	10	Nguyễn Công Phượng
Substitutions:
FW	20	Trần Phi Sơn		(substituted in) 46'
FW	16	Lê Thanh Bình	(yellow card) 71'	(substituted in) 81'
MF	2	Nguyễn Hữu Dũng		(substituted in) 90+3'
Coach:
(Japan) Toshiya Miura

Assistant referees:
Mohammed Al-Abakry (Saudi Arabia)
Saoud Ahmed Al-Maqaleh (Qatar)
Fourth official:
Khamis Mohamed Al-Kuwari (Qatar)

=== Thailand vs Indonesia ===
13 June
20:30

Thailand	5–0	Indonesia
Rungrath 13', 51'; Thitipan 29'; Narubadin 57'; Chanathip 89'	Report^{[usurped]}

National Stadium, Kallang
Referee: Hiroyuki Kimura (Japan)

GK	1	Chanin Sae-Eae
DF	2	Peerapat Notechaiya
DF	8	Artit Daosawang
DF	13	Narubadin Weerawatnodom
DF	17	Tanaboon Kesarat	(yellow card) 5'	(substituted off) 65'
MF	12	Nurul Sriyankem
MF	6	Sarach Yooyen (c)		(substituted off) 62'
MF	7	Thitipan Puangchan
MF	18	Chanathip Songkrasin
MF	29	Rungrath Poomchantuek
FW	23	Chananan Pombuppha		(substituted off) 69'
Substitutions:
MF	24	Siwakorn Jakkuprasat		(substituted in) 62'
DF	5	Adisorn Promrak		(substituted in) 65'
FW	22	Chenrop Samphaodi		(substituted in) 69'
Coach:
(Thailand) Choketawee Promrut

GK	1	Teguh Amiruddin
CB	4	Syaiful Cahya	(yellow card) 18'
CB	2	Vava Mario Yagalo		(substituted off) 62'
CB	16	Hansamu Yama
RWB	13	Manahati Lestusen (c)
LWB	19	Zulfiandi
CM	6	Evan Dimas	(yellow card) 90+1'
CM	17	Paulo Sitanggang		(substituted off) 65'
CM	18	Adam Alis
SS	7	Ahmad Noviandani
CF	11	Yandi Munawar		(substituted off) 51'
Substitutions:
FW	9	Muchlis Hadi		(substituted in) 51'
DF	5	Zalnando		(substituted in) 62'
MF	8	Muhammad Hargianto		(substituted in) 65'
Coach:
(Indonesia) Aji Santoso

Assistant referees:
Satoshi Karakami (Japan)
Saparmammet Gurbanov (Turkmenistan)
Fourth official:
Aziz Asimov (Uzbekistan)

== Bronze medal match ==
=== Vietnam vs Indonesia ===
15 June
14:00

Vietnam	5–0	Indonesia
Mạc Hồng Quân 14' (pen.); Võ Huy Toàn 21', 41'; Nguyễn Hữu Dũng 45+1'; Quế Ngọc Hải 71'	Report^{[usurped]}

National Stadium, Kallang
Referee: Khamis Al-Kuwari (Qatar)

GK	27	Phí Minh Long
DF	3	Phạm Mạnh Hùng
DF	6	Nguyễn Minh Tùng
DF	15	Quế Ngọc Hải (c)
DF	22	Nguyễn Thanh Hiền
MF	2	Nguyễn Hữu Dũng
MF	11	Đỗ Duy Mạnh
MF	25	Võ Huy Toàn	(yellow card) 74'
FW	17	Mạc Hồng Quân		(substituted off) 62'
FW	20	Trần Phi Sơn		(substituted off) 75'
FW	10	Nguyễn Công Phượng
Substitutions:
FW	16	Lê Thanh Bình		(substituted in) 62'
FW	19	Nguyễn Văn Toàn		(substituted in) 75'
Coach:
(Japan) Toshiya Miura

GK	1	Teguh Amiruddin
RB	5	Zalnando		(substituted off) 51'
CB	15	Agung Prasetyo	(yellow card) 61'
CB	16	Hansamu Yama
LB	3	Abduh Lestaluhu
DM	13	Manahati Lestusen (c)
DM	19	Zulfiandi		(substituted off) 58'
CM	18	Adam Alis
RF	7	Ahmad Noviandani	(yellow card) 49'
CF	9	Muchlis Hadi	(yellow card) 27'
LF	10	Wawan Febrianto		(substituted off) 65'
Substitutions:
DF	4	Syaiful Cahya		(substituted in) 51'
FW	11	Yandi Munawar		(substituted in) 58'
FW	20	Ilham Armaiyn		(substituted in) 65'
Coach:
(Indonesia) Aji Santoso

Assistant referees:
Saoud Ahmed Al-Maqaleh (Qatar)
Satoshi Karakami (Japan)
Fourth official:
Hiroyuki Kimura (Japan)

== Gold medal match ==
Poor finishing and excellent goalkeeping from Kyaw Zin Phyo kept Thailand off the sheet until the second half. Both teams named unchanged lineups which had emerged victorious in the semi-finals. They had met twice before the tournament in warm-up friendlies, Thailand won both 1–0 on 18 March 2015 and 4–0 on 19 May 2015. Thailand were completely dominant and Myanmar only had one shot on target all game, and outside effort by captain Nay Lin Tun in the fourteenth minute. In the sixth minute Nurul Sriyankem found Chananan Pombuppha but his effort was stopped by Kyaw. In the fifteenth minute Nurul blasted way over the bar despite being unmarked, and was later denied by Kyaw when his free-kick was saved. Rungrath Poomchantuek was unmarked in the thirty sixth minute but his header was straight at the Burmese goalkeeper. In what was the best chance of the first half in the 43rd minute Chanathip found Thitipan Puangchan with a great pass but the latter was denied by an even better save from the excellent Kyaw in goal. The second had begun much as the first, with Myanmar sitting deep and threatening on the break but Thailand in total control. Chananan really should have scored in the fifty-second minute but was once again denied by Kyaw. The goal was coming as Thailand finally made their dominance count, a Thai corner was cleared only as far as Tanaboon Kesarat, and the midfielder rifled his shot into the net. Chananan was still unable to score, as he was denied in the 58th and 62nd minute by the excellent Kyaw. Chananan finally did get his goal in the sixty-fourth as he ran onto Chanathip's defense-splitting pass and slotted the ball past the onrushing goalkeeper and into the bottom right corner. With that goal Chananan joined Sithu Aung and Võ Huy Toàn with five goals for the tournament. Substitute Pinyo Inpinit added gloss to the scoreline as he latched onto a superb lofted ball from his captain Sarach Yooyen and side-footed the ball past the rooted Zin Phyo.

Thailand set several records during the tournament. During the course of the completion the Thai team scored 24 goals and conceded only one. Not only that but every player in the 20 strong squad played at least 90 minutes, with 12 of those players scoring. For Myanmar under Kyi Lwin could also be proud, having spurred some real shocks with their victories over Indonesia, Singapore and Vietnam. The Burmese team can be especially pleased that they did well despite missing their most talented youth players such as superstar Aung Thu and also Than Paing, Nanda Kyaw, Nyein Chan Aung, and Kyaw Min Oo who were representing Myanmar at the 2015 FIFA U-20 World Cup.

=== Myanmar vs Thailand ===
15 June
20:30

Myanmar	0–3	Thailand
		Tanaboon 54'; Chananan 64'; Pinyo 78'

National Stadium, Kallang
Referee: Kim Hee-gon (South Korea)

GK	1	Kyaw Zin Phyo
DF	14	Phyo Ko Ko Thein		(substituted off) 83'
DF	15	Hein Thiha Zaw	(yellow card) 83'
DF	12	Kyaw Zin Lwin
DF	26	Ye Win Aung
MF	5	Sithu Aung		(substituted off) 79'
MF	6	Hlaing Bo Bo		(substituted off) 61'
MF	21	Ye Ko Oo	(yellow card) 22'
MF	8	Nay Lin Tun (c)
FW	9	Kaung Sat Naing
FW	20	Shine Thura
Substitutions:
FW	22	Thiha Zaw		(substituted in) 61'
MF	17	Zon Moe Aung		(substituted in) 79'
DF	13	Ko Ko Hein		(substituted in) 83'
Coach:
(Myanmar) Kyi Lwin

GK	1	Chanin Sae-Eae
DF	2	Peerapat Notechaiya
DF	8	Artit Daosawang
DF	13	Narubadin Weerawatnodom	(substituted off) 82'
DF	17	Tanaboon Kesarat
MF	12	Nurul Sriyankem
MF	6	Sarach Yooyen (c)
MF	7	Thitipan Puangchan	(substituted off) 74'
MF	18	Chanathip Songkrasin
MF	29	Rungrath Poomchantuek	(substituted off) 60'
FW	23	Chananan Pombuppha
Substitutions:
MF	11	Pinyo Inpinit	(substituted in) 60'
MF	4	Chaowat Veerachat	(substituted in) 74'
DF	19	Tristan Do	(substituted in) 82'
Coach:
(Thailand) Choketawee Promrut

Assistant referees:
Park Sang-jun (South Korea)
Mohammad Reza Mansouri (Iran)
Fourth official:
Turki Al-Khudair (Saudi Arabia)
