= 2016 AFF Championship squads =

Association football competition squads

Below are the squads for the 2016 AFF Championship, co-hosted by Myanmar and Philippines, which took place between 19 November and 17 December 2016.

Each team was allowed to register 22 official players (at least two goalkeepers) and one more reserve player.

== Group A ==
=== Philippines ===
Head coach: (United States) Thomas Dooley

No.	Pos.	Player	Date of birth (age)	Club
2	DF	Junior Muñoz	18 May 1987 (aged 29)	(Philippine Football Federation) Kaya
4	FW	OJ Porteria	9 May 1994 (aged 22)	(Philippine Football Federation) Kaya
5	MF	Mike Ott	2 March 1995 (aged 21)	(German Football Association) 1. FC Nürnberg II
7	MF	Iain Ramsay	27 February 1988 (aged 28)	(Football Australia) Melbourne City
8	MF	Manuel Ott	6 May 1992 (aged 24)	(Philippine Football Federation) Ceres
9	FW	Misagh Bahadoran	10 January 1987 (aged 29)	(Philippine Football Federation) Global
10	FW	Phil Younghusband (captain)	4 August 1987 (aged 29)	(Philippine Football Federation) Loyola Meralco Sparks
12	DF	Amani Aguinaldo	24 April 1995 (aged 21)	(Philippine Football Federation) Global
13	MF	Dennis Villanueva	28 April 1992 (aged 24)	(Philippine Football Federation) Global
14	MF	Kevin Ingreso	10 February 1993 (aged 23)	(Philippine Football Federation) Ceres
15	GK	Roland Müller	2 March 1988 (aged 28)	(Philippine Football Federation) Ceres
16	GK	Patrick Deyto	15 February 1990 (aged 26)	(Philippine Football Federation) Global
17	MF	Stephan Schröck	21 August 1986 (aged 30)	(Philippine Football Federation) Ceres
19	MF	Daniel Gadia	3 July 1995 (aged 21)	(Philippine Football Federation) Loyola Meralco Sparks
21	DF	Martin Steuble	9 June 1988 (aged 28)	(Philippine Football Federation) Ceres
22	FW	Kenshiro Daniels	13 January 1995 (aged 21)	(Philippine Football Federation) Kaya
23	FW	James Younghusband	4 September 1986 (aged 30)	(Philippine Football Federation) Loyola Meralco Sparks
26	FW	Mark Hartmann	24 January 1992 (aged 24)	(Football Association of Singapore) Geylang International
28	DF	Jeffrey Christiaens	17 May 1991 (aged 25)	(Philippine Football Federation) Ceres
32	GK	Nick O'Donnell	23 March 1993 (aged 23)	(Philippine Football Federation) Global
35	DF	Marco Casambre	18 December 1998 (aged 17)	(Philippine Football Federation) Global
36	DF	Shirmar Felongco	27 April 1993 (aged 23)	(Philippine Football Federation) Kaya
40	FW	Hikaru Minegishi	3 July 1991 (aged 25)	(Philippine Football Federation) Global

=== Thailand ===
Head coach: Kiatisuk Senamuang

No.	Pos.	Player	Date of birth (age)	Club
1	GK	Kawin Thamsatchanan	26 January 1990 (aged 26)	(Football Association of Thailand) Muangthong United
2	DF	Peerapat Notchaiya	4 February 1993 (aged 23)	(Football Association of Thailand) Muangthong United
3	DF	Theerathon Bunmathan	6 February 1990 (aged 26)	(Football Association of Thailand) Muangthong United
4	MF	Kroekrit Thaweekarn	19 November 1990 (aged 26)	(Football Association of Thailand) Chonburi
5	DF	Adison Promrak	21 October 1993 (aged 23)	(Football Association of Thailand) Muangthong United
6	MF	Sarach Yooyen	30 May 1992 (aged 24)	(Football Association of Thailand) Muangthong United
7	MF	Charyl Chappuis	12 January 1992 (aged 24)	(Football Association of Thailand) Suphanburi
9	FW	Siroch Chatthong	8 December 1992 (aged 23)	(Football Association of Thailand) Ubon UMT United
10	FW	Teerasil Dangda (captain)	6 June 1988 (aged 28)	(Football Association of Thailand) Muangthong United
11	FW	Mongkol Tossakrai	9 May 1987 (aged 29)	(Football Association of Thailand) Muangthong United
12	MF	Adul Lahsoh	19 September 1986 (aged 30)	(Football Association of Thailand) Suphanburi
14	MF	Sarawut Masuk	3 June 1990 (aged 26)	(Football Association of Thailand) Bangkok Glass
15	DF	Koravit Namwiset	2 August 1986 (aged 30)	(Football Association of Thailand) Buriram United
16	DF	Pratum Chuthong	26 October 1983 (aged 33)	(Football Association of Thailand) Chiangrai United
17	MF	Tanaboon Kesarat	21 September 1993 (aged 23)	(Football Association of Thailand) Chiangrai United
18	MF	Chanathip Songkrasin	5 October 1993 (aged 23)	(Football Association of Thailand) Muangthong United
19	DF	Tristan Do	31 January 1993 (aged 23)	(Football Association of Thailand) Muangthong United
20	GK	Sinthaweechai Hathairattanakool	23 March 1982 (aged 34)	(Football Association of Thailand) Suphanburi
21	MF	Pokklaw Anan	4 March 1991 (aged 25)	(Football Association of Thailand) Chonburi
23	GK	Chanin Sae-ear	5 July 1992 (aged 24)	(Football Association of Thailand) Chonburi
29	FW	Rungrath Poomchantuek	17 May 1992 (aged 24)	(Football Association of Thailand) Ratchaburi Mitr Phol
35	MF	Prakit Deeprom	7 January 1988 (aged 28)	(Football Association of Thailand) Chonburi
36	DF	Pravinwat Boonyong	13 February 1990 (aged 26)	(Football Association of Thailand) Bangkok Glass

=== Singapore ===
Head coach: V. Sundramoorthy

No.	Pos.	Player	Date of birth (age)	Club
1	GK	Izwan Mahbud	14 July 1990 (aged 26)	(Football Association of Singapore) Tampines Rovers
2	DF	Shakir Hamzah	20 October 1992 (aged 24)	(Football Association of Singapore) Tampines Rovers
4	DF	Juma'at Jantan	23 February 1984 (aged 32)	(Football Association of Singapore) Home United
5	DF	Baihakki Khaizan	31 January 1984 (aged 32)	(Football Association of Malaysia) Johor Darul Takzim II
6	DF	Madhu Mohana	6 March 1991 (aged 25)	(Football Association of Singapore) Warriors
7	FW	Gabriel Quak	22 December 1990 (aged 25)	(Football Association of Singapore) Geylang International
8	MF	Shahdan Sulaiman	9 May 1988 (aged 28)	(Football Association of Singapore) Tampines Rovers
9	DF	Faritz Hameed	16 January 1990 (aged 26)	(Football Association of Singapore) Geylang International
10	FW	Faris Ramli	24 August 1992 (aged 24)	(Football Association of Singapore) Home United
13	MF	Izzdin Shafiq	14 December 1990 (aged 25)	(Football Association of Singapore) Tampines Rovers
14	DF	Hariss Harun	19 November 1990 (aged 26)	(Football Association of Malaysia) Johor Darul Takzim
15	DF	Mustafic Fahrudin^{WD}	17 April 1981 (aged 35)	(Football Association of Singapore) Tampines Rovers
16	DF	Daniel Bennett	7 January 1978 (aged 38)	(Football Association of Singapore) Geylang International
17	FW	Shahril Ishak (captain)	23 January 1984 (aged 32)	(Football Association of Malaysia) Johor Darul Takzim II
18	GK	Hassan Sunny	2 April 1984 (aged 32)	(Football Association of Thailand) Army United
19	FW	Khairul Amri	14 March 1985 (aged 31)	(Football Association of Singapore) Garena Young Lions
21	DF	Safuwan Baharudin	22 September 1991 (aged 25)	(Football Association of Malaysia) PDRM
24	MF	Yasir Hanapi	21 June 1989 (aged 27)	(Football Association of Singapore) Tampines Rovers
25	MF	Anumanthan Kumar	14 July 1994 (aged 22)	(Football Association of Singapore) Hougang United
28	MF	Hafiz Abu Sujad	12 January 1990 (aged 26)	(Football Association of Singapore) Tampines Rovers
29	MF	Shahfiq Ghani	17 March 1992 (aged 24)	(Football Association of Singapore) Geylang International
30	GK	Syazwan Buhari	22 September 1992 (aged 24)	(Football Association of Singapore) Geylang International
32	FW	Sahil Suhaimi	8 July 1992 (aged 24)	(Football Association of Singapore) Geylang International

=== Indonesia ===
Head coach: (Austria) Alfred Riedl

No.	Pos.	Player	Date of birth (age)	Club
1	GK	Kurnia Meiga	7 May 1990 (aged 26)	(Football Association of Indonesia) Arema Cronus
2	DF	Beny Wahyudi	20 March 1986 (aged 30)	(Football Association of Indonesia) Arema Cronus
3	DF	Abduh Lestaluhu	16 October 1993 (aged 23)	(Football Association of Indonesia) PS TNI
4	DF	Abdul Rachman	30 January 1988 (aged 28)	(Football Association of Indonesia) Persiba Balikpapan
6	MF	Evan Dimas	13 March 1995 (aged 21)	(Football Association of Indonesia) Bhayangkara
7	FW	Boaz Solossa (captain)	16 March 1986 (aged 30)	(Football Association of Indonesia) Persipura Jayapura
8	FW	Stefano Lilipaly	10 January 1990 (aged 26)	(Royal Dutch Football Association) Telstar
9	FW	Ferdinand Sinaga	28 September 1988 (aged 28)	(Football Association of Indonesia) PSM Makassar
10	FW	Zulham Zamrun	19 February 1988 (aged 28)	(Football Association of Indonesia) Persib Bandung
11	MF	Dedi Kusnandar	23 July 1991 (aged 25)	(Football Association of Malaysia) Sabah
12	FW	Lerby Eliandry	21 November 1991 (aged 24)	(Football Association of Indonesia) Pusamania Borneo
13	DF	Yanto Basna	12 March 1995 (aged 21)	(Football Association of Indonesia) Persib Bandung
14	FW	Rizky Pora	22 November 1989 (aged 26)	(Football Association of Indonesia) Barito Putera
16	DF	Fachrudin Aryanto	19 February 1989 (aged 27)	(Football Association of Indonesia) Sriwijaya
17	FW	Muchlis Hadi	26 October 1996 (aged 20)	(Football Association of Indonesia) PSM Makassar
18	MF	Bayu Gatra	11 November 1991 (aged 25)	(Football Association of Indonesia) Madura United
19	MF	Bayu Pradana	19 April 1991 (aged 25)	(Football Association of Indonesia) Mitra Kukar
21	FW	Andik Vermansyah	23 November 1991 (aged 24)	(Football Association of Malaysia) Selangor
22	GK	Teja Paku Alam	14 September 1994 (aged 22)	(Football Association of Indonesia) Sriwijaya
23	DF	Hansamu Yama	16 January 1995 (aged 21)	(Football Association of Indonesia) Barito Putera
25	MF	Manahati Lestusen	17 December 1993 (aged 22)	(Football Association of Indonesia) PS TNI
26	GK	Andritany Ardhiyasa	26 December 1991 (aged 24)	(Football Association of Indonesia) Persija Jakarta
27	DF	Gunawan Dwi Cahyo	20 April 1989 (aged 27)	(Football Association of Indonesia) Persija Jakarta

== Group B ==
=== Myanmar ===
Head coach: (Germany) Gerd Zeise

No.	Pos.	Player	Date of birth (age)	Club
1	GK	Yan Aung Lin	6 March 1993 (aged 23)	(Myanmar Football Federation) Yadanarbon
3	DF	Zaw Min Tun	20 May 1992 (aged 24)	(Myanmar Football Federation) Yangon United
4	DF	David Htan	13 May 1990 (aged 26)	(Myanmar Football Federation) Yangon United
5	DF	Nanda Kyaw	3 September 1996 (aged 20)	(Myanmar Football Federation) Magwe
6	MF	Yan Aung Kyaw (captain)	4 August 1989 (aged 27)	(Myanmar Football Federation) Yangon United
7	MF	Ye Ko Oo	20 August 1994 (aged 22)	(Myanmar Football Federation) Yadanarbon
8	FW	Kaung Sett Naing	21 March 1993 (aged 23)	(Football Association of Thailand) Samut Sakhon
9	MF	Aung Thu	22 May 1996 (aged 20)	(Myanmar Football Federation) Yadanarbon
10	FW	Win Naing Soe	24 October 1993 (aged 23)	(Myanmar Football Federation) Yadanarbon
11	MF	Myo Ko Tun	9 March 1995 (aged 21)	(Myanmar Football Federation) Yadanarbon
12	DF	Kyaw Zin Lwin	4 May 1993 (aged 23)	(Myanmar Football Federation) Magwe
14	MF	Yan Naing Oo	31 March 1996 (aged 20)	(Myanmar Football Federation) Shan United
15	DF	Phyo Ko Ko Thein	24 January 1993 (aged 23)	(Myanmar Football Federation) Ayeyawady United
16	MF	Hlaing Bo Bo	12 June 1993 (aged 23)	(Myanmar Football Federation) Yadanarbon
17	DF	Hein Thiha Zaw	1 August 1995 (aged 21)	(Myanmar Football Federation) Shan United
18	GK	Kyaw Zin Phyo	1 February 1994 (aged 22)	(Myanmar Football Federation) Magwe
19	DF	Set Phyo Wai	1 December 1994 (aged 21)	(Myanmar Football Federation) Magwe
20	FW	Suan Lam Mang	28 July 1994 (aged 22)	(Myanmar Football Federation) Chin United
21	MF	Maung Maung Lwin	18 June 1995 (aged 21)	(Myanmar Football Federation) Hanthawaddy United
22	FW	Than Paing	6 December 1996 (aged 19)	(Myanmar Football Federation) Yangon United
23	GK	Pyae Phyo Aung	8 July 1991 (aged 25)	(Myanmar Football Federation) Southern Myanmar
24	DF	Win Min Htut	2 January 1986 (aged 30)	(Myanmar Football Federation) Shan United
25	MF	Zin Phyo Aung	6 November 1995 (aged 21)	(Myanmar Football Federation) Zwekapin United

=== Malaysia ===
Head coach: Ong Kim Swee

No.	Pos.	Player	Date of birth (age)	Club
1	GK	Khairul Azhan Khalid	7 November 1989 (aged 27)	(Football Association of Malaysia) Selangor
2	DF	Matthew Davies	7 February 1995 (aged 21)	(Football Association of Malaysia) Pahang
3	DF	Shahrul Saad	8 July 1993 (aged 23)	(Football Association of Malaysia) Perak
4	DF	Fadhli Shas	21 January 1991 (aged 25)	(Football Association of Malaysia) Johor Darul Ta'zim
5	DF	Shahrom Kalam	15 September 1985 (aged 31)	(Football Association of Malaysia) Selangor
7	MF	Baddrol Bakhtiar	1 February 1988 (aged 28)	(Football Association of Malaysia) Kedah
8	FW	Zaquan Adha	3 August 1987 (aged 29)	(Football Association of Malaysia) Johor Darul Ta'zim II
9	FW	Norshahrul Idlan Talaha	8 June 1986 (aged 30)	(Football Association of Malaysia) Terengganu
10	FW	Safee Sali	29 January 1984 (aged 32)	(Football Association of Malaysia) Johor Darul Ta'zim
11	FW	Hazwan Bakri	19 June 1991 (aged 25)	(Football Association of Malaysia) Selangor
12	MF	S. Veenod	31 March 1988 (aged 28)	(Football Association of Malaysia) Selangor
13	DF	Khairul Helmi	31 March 1988 (aged 28)	(Football Association of Malaysia) Kedah
14	FW	Fakri Saarani	8 July 1989 (aged 27)	(Football Association of Malaysia) Felda United
15	DF	Rizal Ghazali	1 October 1992 (aged 24)	(Football Association of Malaysia) Kedah
16	FW	Syazwan Zainon	13 November 1989 (aged 27)	(Football Association of Malaysia) Kedah
17	FW	Amri Yahyah (captain)	21 January 1981 (aged 35)	(Football Association of Malaysia) Johor Darul Ta'zim
18	FW	Darren Lok	9 March 1991 (aged 25)	(Football Association of Malaysia) Johor Darul Ta'zim
19	GK	Khairul Fahmi	7 January 1989 (aged 27)	(Football Association of Malaysia) Kelantan
20	MF	Irfan Fazail	12 April 1991 (aged 25)	(Football Association of Malaysia) Johor Darul Ta'zim
21	DF	Nazirul Naim	6 April 1993 (aged 23)	(Football Association of Malaysia) Perak
22	GK	Hafizul Hakim	30 March 1993 (aged 23)	(Football Association of Malaysia) Perak
23	MF	Hadin Azman	2 July 1994 (aged 22)	(Football Association of Malaysia) Felda United
24	DF	Ronny Harun	19 January 1984 (aged 32)	(Football Association of Malaysia) Sarawak

=== Vietnam ===
Head coach: Nguyễn Hữu Thắng

No.	Pos.	Player	Date of birth (age)	Club
1	GK	Trần Nguyên Mạnh	20 December 1991 (aged 24)	(Vietnam Football Federation) Sông Lam Nghệ An
2	DF	Âu Văn Hoàn	1 October 1989 (aged 27)	(Vietnam Football Federation) Becamex Bình Dương
3	DF	Trương Đình Luật	12 November 1983 (aged 33)	(Vietnam Football Federation) Becamex Bình Dương
5	DF	Đinh Tiến Thành	24 January 1991 (aged 25)	(Vietnam Football Federation) XSKT Cần Thơ
6	MF	Vũ Minh Tuấn	19 September 1990 (aged 26)	(Vietnam Football Federation) Than Quảng Ninh
7	MF	Ngô Hoàng Thịnh	21 April 1992 (aged 24)	(Vietnam Football Federation) FLC Thanh Hóa
8	MF	Nguyễn Trọng Hoàng	14 April 1989 (aged 27)	(Vietnam Football Federation) Becamex Bình Dương
9	FW	Lê Công Vinh (captain)	10 December 1985 (aged 30)	(Vietnam Football Federation) Becamex Bình Dương
10	MF	Nguyễn Văn Quyết	1 July 1991 (aged 25)	(Vietnam Football Federation) Hà Nội
11	MF	Phạm Thành Lương	10 September 1988 (aged 28)	(Vietnam Football Federation) Hà Nội
12	FW	Lê Văn Thắng	8 February 1990 (aged 26)	(Vietnam Football Federation) Hải Phòng
13	DF	Trần Đình Đồng	20 May 1987 (aged 29)	(Vietnam Football Federation) FLC Thanh Hóa
14	MF	Lương Xuân Trường	28 April 1995 (aged 21)	(Korea Football Association) Incheon United
15	DF	Quế Ngọc Hải	15 May 1993 (aged 23)	(Vietnam Football Federation) Sông Lam Nghệ An
16	FW	Nguyễn Công Phượng	21 January 1995 (aged 21)	(Japan Football Association) Mito HollyHock
17	DF	Vũ Văn Thanh	14 April 1996 (aged 20)	(Vietnam Football Federation) Hoàng Anh Gia Lai
18	MF	Đinh Thanh Trung	24 January 1988 (aged 28)	(Vietnam Football Federation) QNK Quảng Nam
20	FW	Trần Phi Sơn	14 March 1992 (aged 24)	(Vietnam Football Federation) Sông Lam Nghệ An
21	FW	Nguyễn Văn Toàn	12 April 1996 (aged 20)	(Vietnam Football Federation) Hoàng Anh Gia Lai
22	GK	Huỳnh Tuấn Linh	17 April 1991 (aged 25)	(Vietnam Football Federation) Than Quảng Ninh
23	GK	Đặng Văn Lâm	13 August 1993 (aged 23)	(Vietnam Football Federation) Hải Phòng
25	DF	Bùi Tiến Dũng	2 October 1995 (aged 21)	(Vietnam Football Federation) Viettel
28	DF	Sầm Ngọc Đức	18 May 1992 (aged 24)	(Vietnam Football Federation) Hà Nội T&T

=== Cambodia ===
Head coach: (South Korea) Lee Tae-hoon

No.	Pos.	Player	Date of birth (age)	Club
1	GK	Sou Yaty	17 December 1991 (aged 24)	(Football Federation of Cambodia) Boeung Ket Angkor
2	DF	Ros Kungsomrach	21 January 1994 (aged 22)	(Football Federation of Cambodia) Preah Khan Reach Svay Rieng
3	DF	Nen Sothearoth	24 December 1995 (aged 20)	(Football Federation of Cambodia) Preah Khan Reach Svay Rieng
5	DF	Soeuy Visal	19 August 1995 (aged 21)	(Football Federation of Cambodia) Preah Khan Reach Svay Rieng
6	DF	Pidor Sam Oeun	20 May 1996 (aged 20)	(Football Federation of Cambodia) Preah Khan Reach Svay Rieng
7	FW	Prak Mony Udom	24 August 1994 (aged 22)	(Football Federation of Cambodia) Preah Khan Reach Svay Rieng
8	FW	Hoy Phallin	30 March 1996 (aged 20)	(Football Federation of Cambodia) Preah Khan Reach Svay Rieng
9	FW	Khoun Laboravy	25 August 1988 (aged 28)	(Football Federation of Cambodia) Boeung Ket Angkor
10	FW	Keo Sokpheng	3 March 1992 (aged 24)	(Football Federation of Cambodia) Phnom Penh Crown
11	FW	Chan Vathanaka (captain)	23 January 1994 (aged 22)	(Football Federation of Cambodia) Boeung Ket Angkor
12	MF	Sos Suhana	4 April 1992 (aged 24)	(Football Federation of Cambodia) Nagaworld
13	DF	Nub Tola	1 October 1996 (aged 20)	(Football Federation of Cambodia) Preah Khan Reach Svay Rieng
14	DF	Sok Samnang	18 January 1995 (aged 21)	(Football Federation of Cambodia) Preah Khan Reach Svay Rieng
15	MF	Tith Dina	5 June 1993 (aged 23)	(Football Federation of Cambodia) National Police Commissary
16	MF	Chrerng Polroth	7 April 1997 (aged 19)	(Football Federation of Cambodia) National Defense Ministry
17	FW	Chhin Chhoeun	10 September 1992 (aged 24)	(Football Federation of Cambodia) National Defense Ministry
18	MF	In Sodavid	2 July 1998 (aged 18)	(Football Federation of Cambodia) Phnom Penh Crown
19	DF	Cheng Meng	27 February 1998 (aged 18)	(Football Federation of Cambodia) Nagaworld
20	DF	Sok Sovan	5 April 1992 (aged 24)	(Football Federation of Cambodia) Boeung Ket Angkor
22	GK	Um Sereyroth	25 September 1995 (aged 21)	(Football Federation of Cambodia) National Defense Ministry
23	MF	Thierry Chantha Bin	1 June 1991 (aged 25)	(Football Federation of Cambodia) Phnom Penh Crown
26	DF	Rous Samoeun	20 December 1994 (aged 21)	(Football Federation of Cambodia) Boeung Ket Angkor
30	GK	Keo Soksela	1 August 1997 (aged 19)	(Football Federation of Cambodia) Phnom Penh Crown
