= Football at the 2015 SEA Games =

Football at the Southeast Asian Games

Football – Men's tournament at the 2015 SEA Games
- Venues: Singapore National Stadium; Jalan Besar Stadium; Bishan Stadium
- Dates: 29 May – 15 June 2015
- Competitors: 220 from 11 nations

Medalists
gold medal	Thailand (THA)
silver medal	Myanmar (MYA)
bronze medal	Vietnam (VIE)

Football at the 2015 SEA Games was held at Singapore National Stadium, Jalan Besar Stadium and Bishan Stadium, Singapore from 29 May to 15 June 2015. Medals were awarded in one event for men's competitions. There were match-fixing scandals involving the East Timor team with several other teams.

In contrast to the previous editions, the organizers decided to not include a women's tournament in this edition.

== Venues ==
Three football stadiums were hosted matches of the football competition:

Singapore
Singapore National Stadium	Jalan Besar Stadium	Bishan Stadium
Capacity: 55,000	Capacity: 11,000	Capacity: 4,200
Singapore National Stadium	Jalan Besar Stadium	Bishan Stadium

== Participating nations ==
A total of 220 athletes from 11 nations competed in football at the 2015 Southeast Asian Games:

- Brunei (30)
- Cambodia (22)
- Indonesia (20)
- Laos (26)
- Malaysia (29)
- Myanmar (30)
- Philippines (29)
- Singapore (28)
- Thailand (29)
- Timor-Leste (23)
- Vietnam (27)

== Draw ==
The draw for the tournament was held on 15 April 2015.

Pot 1	Pot 2
Singapore (hosts); Indonesia; Myanmar; Cambodia; Philippines	Thailand (holders); Malaysia; Vietnam; Laos; Brunei; Timor-Leste

== Competition schedule ==
The following was the competition schedule for the football competitions:

P	Preliminaries	½	Semifinals	B	3rd place play-off	F	Final

Event↓/Date →	Fri 29	Sat 30	Sun 31	Mon 1	Tue 2	Wed 3	Thu 4	Fri 5	Sat 6	Sun 7	Mon 8	Tue 9	Wed 10	Thu 11	Fri 12	Sat 13	Sun 14	Mon 15	
Men	P	P	P	P	P	P	P		P	P	P	P	P	P		½		B	F

== Medal summary ==
=== Medal table ===
Rank	Nation	Gold	Silver	Bronze	Total
1	Thailand (THA)	1	0	0	1
2	Myanmar (MYA)	0	1	0	1
3	Vietnam (VIE)	0	0	1	1
Totals (3 entries)		1	1	1	3

=== Medalists ===
Source: Medallists (Teams)

Event	Gold	Silver	Bronze
Men	Thailand (THA); Chanin Sae-Eae; Peerapat Notechaiya; Suriya Singmui; Chaowat Veerachat; Adisorn Promrak; Sarach Yooyen; Thitipan Puangchan; Artit Daosawang; Pinyo Inpinit; Nurul Sriyankem; Narubadin Weerawatnodom; Pakorn Prempak; Tanaboon Kesarat; Chanathip Songkrasin; Tristan Do; Somporn Yos; Chenrop Samphaodi; Chananan Pombuppha; Siwakorn Jakkuprasat; Rungrath Poomchantuek	Myanmar (MYA); Kyaw Zin Phyo; Sithu Aung; Hlaing Bo Bo; Aung Show Thar Maung; Nay Lin Tun; Kaung Sett Naing; Aung Kyaw Naing; Kyaw Zin Lwin; Ko Ko Hein; Phyo Ko Ko Thein; Hein Thiha Zaw; Zon Moe Aung; Chit Su Moe; Shine Thura; Ye Ko Oo; Thiha Zaw; Ye Win Aung; Thein Naing Oo; Win Zin Oo; Aung Wai Phyo	Vietnam (VIE); Phạm Văn Tiến; Nguyễn Hữu Dũng; Phạm Mạnh Hùng; Nguyễn Minh Tùng; Nguyễn Công Phượng; Đỗ Duy Mạnh; Vũ Ngọc Thịnh; Huỳnh Tấn Tài; Nguyễn Huy Hùng; Quế Ngọc Hải; Lê Thanh Bình; Mạc Hồng Quân; Hồ Ngọc Thắng; Nguyễn Văn Toàn; Trần Phi Sơn; Nguyễn Thanh Hiền; Phạm Đức Huy; Võ Huy Toàn; Bùi Tiến Dũng; Phí Minh Long

== Results ==
All times listed are UTC+8

=== Preliminary round ===
==== Group A ====
Pos	Team	Pld	W	D	L	GF	GA	GD	Pts	Qualification
1	Myanmar	4	3	1	0	14	7	+7	10	Semi-finals
2	Indonesia	4	3	0	1	11	5	+6	9	Semi-finals
3	Singapore (H)	4	2	0	2	5	4	+1	6	
4	Cambodia	4	1	1	2	8	13	−5	4	
5	Philippines	4	0	0	4	2	11	−9	0	

Source: Seagames 2015
Rules for classification: 1) Points; 2) Goal difference; 3) Goals scored
(H) Hosts

1 June
20:30

Philippines	0–1	Singapore
		Abdul Hadi 45'

Jalan Besar Stadium, Kallang
Referee: Hiroyuki Kimura (Japan)

2 June
20:30

Myanmar	4–2	Indonesia
Shine Thura 21'; Sithu Aung 38', 54'; Kyaw Zin Lwin 66'	Report	Abduh 45+2'; Dani 70'

Jalan Besar Stadium, Kallang
Referee: Kim Hee-gon (South Korea)

3 June
20:30

Cambodia	3–1	Philippines
Udom 30'; Sokpheng 41'; Vathanaka 81'	Report	Salenga 53'

Jalan Besar Stadium, Kallang
Referee: Mo'ud Bonyadifard (Iran)

4 June
20:30

Singapore	1–2	Myanmar
Faris 34' (pen.)		Nay Lin Tun 24'; Ye Ko Oo 60'

Jalan Besar Stadium, Kallang
Referee: Yousef Al-Marzouq (Kuwait)

6 June
20:30

Indonesia	6–1	Cambodia
Muchlis 12', 68', 74'; Dani 37'; Wawan 85'; Evan 90+3'	Report	Udom 56' (pen.)

Jalan Besar Stadium, Kallang
Referee: Turki Al-Khudair (Saudi Arabia)

7 June
20:30

Philippines	1–5	Myanmar
Felongco 17'	Report	Nay Lin Tun 21'; Shine Thura 46'; Ye Win Aung 62'; Sithu Aung 69'; Kyaw Zin Lwin 90+1'

Jalan Besar Stadium, Kallang
Referee: Khamis Al-Kuwari (Qatar)

8 June
20:30

Cambodia	1–3	Singapore
Vathanaka 57'	Report	Safirul 45+1'; Faris 45+2'; Sahil 90'

Jalan Besar Stadium, Kallang
Referee: Ma Ning (China)

9 June
20:30

Indonesia	2–0	Philippines
Evan 4', 13'	Report

Jalan Besar Stadium, Kallang
Referee: Aziz Asimov (Uzbekistan)

10 June
20:30

Myanmar	3–3	Cambodia
Thiha Zaw 53'; Kaung Sat Naing 89'; Sithu Aung 90+1'	Report	Sokpheng 26', 55'; Vathanaka 45+5' (pen.)

Jalan Besar Stadium, Kallang
Referee: Hiroyuki Kimura (Japan)

11 June
20:30

Singapore	0–1	Indonesia
	Report	Evan 47'

Jalan Besar Stadium, Kallang
Referee: Kim Hee-gon (South Korea)

==== Group B ====
Pos	Team	Pld	W	D	L	GF	GA	GD	Pts	Qualification
1	Thailand	5	5	0	0	16	1	+15	15	Semi-finals
2	Vietnam	5	4	0	1	17	4	+13	12	Semi-finals
3	Malaysia	5	3	0	2	7	7	0	9	
4	Laos	5	2	0	3	6	13	−7	6	
5	Timor-Leste	5	1	0	4	4	10	−6	3	
6	Brunei	5	0	0	5	2	17	−15	0	

Source: Seagames 2015
Rules for classification: 1) Points; 2) Goal difference; 3) Goals scored

29 May
16:00

Brunei	0–6	Vietnam
	Report	Lê Thanh Bình 24'; Trần Phi Sơn 47'; Mạc Hồng Quân 75'; Phạm Đức Huy 78'; Nguyễn Công Phượng 82'; Phạm Mạnh Hùng 89'

Bishan Stadium, Bishan
Referee: Yousef Al-Marzouq (Kuwait)

29 May
20:30

Laos	0–6	Thailand
	Report	Narubadin 10'; Chananan 19', 47', 62' (pen.), 74'; Nurul 38'

Bishan Stadium, Bishan
Referee: Mo'ud Bonyadifard (Iran)

30 May
20:30

Malaysia	1–0	Timor-Leste
Saarvindran 12'	Report

Bishan Stadium, Bishan
Referee: Foo Chuan Hui (Singapore)

31 May
20:30

Brunei	1–2	Laos
Azwan 68'		Khochalern 11'; Natphasouk 74'

Bishan Stadium, Bishan
Referee: Ma Ning (China)

1 June
20:30

Thailand	1–0	Timor-Leste
Rungrath 44'	Report

Bishan Stadium, Bishan
Referee: Aziz Asimov (Uzbekistan)

2 June
20:30

Vietnam	5–1	Malaysia
Mạc Hồng Quân 15' (pen.); Nguyễn Công Phượng 45+1', 53'; Võ Huy Toàn 47' (pen.); Nguyễn Văn Toàn 80'		Syahrul 78'

Bishan Stadium, Bishan
Referee: Turki Al-Khudair (Saudi Arabia)

3 June
20:30

Timor-Leste	2–1	Brunei
Neto 24'; Helber 74'	Report	Faiq 68' (pen.)

Bishan Stadium, Bishan
Referee: Khamis Al-Kuwari (Qatar)

4 June
16:00

Malaysia	0–1	Thailand
		Sarach 81'

Bishan Stadium, Bishan
Referee: Ma Ning (China)

4 June
20:30

Vietnam	1–0	Laos
Nguyễn Thanh Hiền 65'

Bishan Stadium, Bishan
Referee: Hiroyuki Kimura (Japan)

6 June
20:30

Thailand	5–0	Brunei
Chenrop 19', 31'; Thitipan 53'; Tristan 71'; Nurul 90+4'

Bishan Stadium, Bishan
Referee: Aziz Asimov (Uzbekistan)

7 June
20:30

Timor-Leste	0–4	Vietnam
	Report	Trần Phi Sơn 12'; Mạc Hồng Quân 50'; Quế Ngọc Hải 57'; Võ Huy Toàn 61'

Bishan Stadium, Bishan
Referee: Kim Hee-gon (South Korea)

8 June
20:30

Brunei	0–2	Malaysia
	Report	Nurridzuan 71'; Adam Nor 77'

Bishan Stadium, Bishan
Referee: Mo'ud Bonyadifard (Iran)

9 June
20:30

Timor-Leste	2–3	Laos
Alves 22'; Martins 90+1'	Report	Sipasong 27'; Khochalern 47'; Sihavong 67'

Bishan Stadium, Bishan
Referee: Turki Al-Khudair (Saudi Arabia)

10 June
20:30

Vietnam	1–3	Thailand
Lê Thanh Bình 90'	Report	Pakorn 22'; Thitipan 63' (pen.); Tristan 77'

Bishan Stadium, Bishan
Referee: Yousef Al-Marzouq (Kuwait)

11 June
20:30

Laos	1–3	Malaysia
Natphasouk 22'	Report	Syafiq 42'; Saiful 71'; Syahrul 81'

Bishan Stadium, Bishan
Referee: Khamis Al-Kuwari (Qatar)

=== Knockout round ===
Semi-finals
13 June – Kallang, Singapore
Myanmar	2
Vietnam	1
13 June – Kallang, Singapore
Thailand	5
Indonesia	0

Gold medal match
15 June – Kallang, Singapore
Myanmar	0
Thailand	3
Bronze medal match
15 June – Kallang, Singapore
Vietnam	5
Indonesia	0

==== Semi-finals ====
13 June
14:00

Myanmar	2–1	Vietnam
Sithu Aung 39' (pen.); Nay Lin Tun 80'	Report	Võ Huy Toàn 72'

National Stadium, Kallang
Referee: Turki Al-Khudair (Saudi Arabia)

13 June
20:30

Thailand	5–0	Indonesia
Rungrath 13', 51'; Thitipan 29'; Narubadin 57'; Chanathip 89'	Report

National Stadium, Kallang
Referee: Hiroyuki Kimura (Japan)

==== Bronze medal match ====
15 June
14:00

Vietnam	5–0	Indonesia
Mạc Hồng Quân 14' (pen.); Võ Huy Toàn 21', 41'; Nguyễn Hữu Dũng 45+1'; Quế Ngọc Hải 71'	Report

National Stadium, Kallang
Referee: Khamis Al-Kuwari (Qatar)

==== Gold medal match ====
15 June
20:30

Myanmar	0–3	Thailand
		Tanaboon 54'; Chananan 64'; Pinyo 78'

National Stadium, Kallang
Referee: Kim Hee-gon (South Korea)

== Winners ==
2015 SEA Games Men's Tournament
(Thailand)
Thailand
Fifteenth title

== Final standing ==
Pos	Team	Pld	W	D	L	GF	GA	GD	Pts	Final Result
1	Thailand	7	7	0	0	24	1	+23	21	Gold Medal
2	Myanmar	6	4	1	1	16	11	+5	13	Silver Medal
3	Vietnam	7	5	0	2	23	6	+17	15	Bronze Medal
4	Indonesia	6	3	0	3	11	15	−4	9	Fourth place
5	Malaysia	5	3	0	2	7	7	0	9	Eliminated in group stage
6	Singapore (H)	4	2	0	2	5	4	+1	6	Eliminated in group stage
7	Laos	5	2	0	3	6	13	−7	6	Eliminated in group stage
8	Cambodia	4	1	1	2	8	13	−5	4	Eliminated in group stage
9	Timor-Leste	5	1	0	4	4	10	−6	3	Eliminated in group stage
10	Philippines	4	0	0	4	2	11	−9	0	Eliminated in group stage
11	Brunei	5	0	0	5	2	17	−15	0	Eliminated in group stage

Source: Final Standing
(H) Hosts

== Goalscorers ==
5 goals

- (Myanmar) Sithu Aung
- (Thailand) Chananan Pombuppha
- (Vietnam) Võ Huy Toàn

4 goals

- (Indonesia) Evan Dimas
- (Vietnam) Mạc Hồng Quân

3 goals

- (Cambodia) Chan Vathanaka
- (Cambodia) Keo Sokpheng
- (Indonesia) Muchlis Hadi
- (Myanmar) Nay Lin Tun
- (Thailand) Rungrath Poomchantuek
- (Thailand) Thitipan Puangchan
- (Vietnam) Nguyễn Công Phượng

2 goals

- (Cambodia) Prak Mony Udom
- (Indonesia) Ahmad Noviandani
- (Laos) Phoutthasay Khochalern
- (Laos) Soukchinda Natphasouk
- (Malaysia) Syahrul Azwari
- (Myanmar) Kyaw Zin Lwin
- (Myanmar) Shine Thura
- (Singapore) Faris Ramli
- (Thailand) Chenrop Samphaodi
- (Thailand) Narubadin Weerawatnodom
- (Thailand) Nurul Sriyankem
- (Thailand) Tristan Do
- (Vietnam) Lê Thanh Bình
- (Vietnam) Quế Ngọc Hải
- (Vietnam) Trần Phi Sơn

1 goal

- (Brunei) Azwan Ali Rahman
- (Brunei) Faiq Jefri Bolkiah
- (Indonesia) Abduh Lestaluhu
- (Indonesia) Wawan Febrianto
- (Laos) Bounthavy Sipasong
- (Laos) Khonesavanh Sihavong
- (Malaysia) Adam Nor Azlin
- (Malaysia) D. Saarvindran
- (Malaysia) Syafiq Ahmad
- (Malaysia) Nurridzuan Abu Hassan
- (Malaysia) Saiful Ridzuwan
- (Myanmar) Kaung Sat Naing
- (Myanmar) Thiha Zaw
- (Myanmar) Ye Ko Oo
- (Myanmar) Ye Win Aung
- (Philippines) Paolo Salenga
- (Philippines) Shirmar Felongco
- (Singapore) Safirul Sulaiman
- (Singapore) Sahil Suhaimi
- (Singapore) Sheikh Abdul Hadi
- (Thailand) Chanathip Songkrasin
- (Thailand) Pakorn Prempak
- (Thailand) Pinyo Inpinit
- (Thailand) Sarach Yooyen
- (Thailand) Tanaboon Kesarat
- (Timor-Leste) Frangcyatma Alves
- (Timor-Leste) Henrique Cruz
- (Timor-Leste) Jairo Neto
- (Timor-Leste) Paulo Helber
- (Vietnam) Nguyễn Hữu Dũng
- (Vietnam) Nguyễn Thanh Hiền
- (Vietnam) Nguyễn Văn Toàn
- (Vietnam) Phạm Đức Huy
- (Vietnam) Phạm Mạnh Hùng

== Match-fixing ==
On 6 November 2015, Timor Leste's Technical director Orlando Marques Henriques Mendes and former international player Moisés Natalino De Jesus were sentenced to 24 months and 20 months imprisonment respectively for offences related to football match-fixing activities. A Singaporean match-fixer Rajendran R Kurusamy had agreed to pay S$15k should Timor Leste to lose their opening game against Malaysia. Rajendran and Indonesian accomplice Nasiruddin pleaded guilty as well and were sentenced to 48 and 30 months’ jail respectively.

Preceded by 2013	Football at the SEA Games; 2015 SEA Games	Succeeded by 2017
