= Matthew Nierras =

American soccer player (born 1993)

Personal information
- Full name: Matthew Erwin Thomas Dacanay Nierras
- Date of birth: February 6, 1993 (age 33)
- Place of birth: San Mateo, California, United States
- Positions: Center-back; full-back

Team information
- Current team: Stallion Laguna
- Number: 3

Youth career
- PAREF Southridge

College career
Years	Team	Apps	(Gls)
2011–2015	De La Salle University		

Senior career*
Years	Team	Apps	(Gls)
2011–	Stallion Laguna	117	(1)
- * Club domestic league appearances and goals as of 2:07, September 3, 2023 (UTC)

Matthew Erwin Thomas Dacanay Nierras (born February 6, 1993) is an American professional soccer player who plays as a defender for Philippines Football League club Stallion Laguna.

== Personal life ==
Nierras was born in San Mateo, California. His father, Ernie, is the current coach of Stallion Laguna, where Matthew plays, and has also managed the Philippine women's national football team. His sister, Samantha, also plays club soccer for Stallion and is a former national team player. Alongside former La Salle teammate Gregory Yang, the two work for clothing company Cutz Apparel.

== Career ==
=== De La Salle University ===
Nierras played high school soccer for PAREF Southridge School alongside future teammate Gregory Yang. He played college soccer for the team of De La Salle University and was co-captain in his final year, where La Salle reached the final after a long drought, losing late on to Far Eastern University, 3–2.

=== Stallion Laguna ===
While playing for De La Salle University, he also suited up for United Football League club Stallion alongside La Salle teammate Nathaniel Alquiros. Due to the league's status being amateur, he was allowed to participate in both without complication. While playing for them in 2013, Stallion won the 2013 United Football League, the first and only in the club's history. In 2015, he took a break from the club to focus on his final UAAP season as a senior, returning to the club after. At the onset of the 2017 Philippines Football League, the first professional league in the country, he became a starter for the team and eventually became club captain, leading them to their first-ever qualification for the AFC Cup in 2023 alongside two third-place finishes in the Copa Paulino Alcantara in 2021 and 2022.

== International career ==
=== Philippines ===
Nierras was called up to the Philippine senior team multiple times, but has not had a senior cap yet. In 2018, he was called up to the Azkals squad for the 2018 Bangabandhu Cup in Bangladesh, but just before the tournament's start was ruled out of participation after suffering an ACL injury in a Copa match against the Davao Aguilas. In 2022, he was again called up to the Azkals for the 2023 AFC Asian Cup qualifiers, but did not make it to the final squad. In July 2022, he finally made it to the senior squad in a friendly 4–1 win against Timor-Leste, but remained on the bench.

== Coaching career ==
In 2022, Nierras took part in the PFF "C" Diploma Blended Course held in Carmona, Cavite, alongside Stephan Schröck, Marwin Angeles, Hikaru Minegishi, and Nathan Alquiros.
