= Lee Tae-hoon =

- Hangul: 이태훈
- RR: I Taehun
- MR: I T'aehun

Lee Tae-hoon or Lee Tae-hun may refer to:

- Lee Tae-hoon (footballer) (born 1971), football manager
- Lee Tae-hoon (sailor) (born 1986), windsurfer
