= Myanmar Grand Royal Challenge Cup =

Football tournament in Myanmar

The Myanmar Grand Royal Challenge Cup is a football tournament held in Myanmar. Club sides and national teams take part at the competition.

The competition was first held in 2005.

== Champions ==
Year	Champions	Runners-up	Score in final
2005	Myanmar U-23	BFF XI	2–1
2006	Myanmar	Myanmar U-23	3–2
2007	(not held)		
2008	Myanmar	Indonesia	2–1

== Teams' achievements ==
Below is the record of teams which participated at the Myanmar Grand Royal Challenge Cup.

Teams	Champions	Runners-up
Myanmar	2	—
Myanmar U-23	1	1
BFF XI	—	1
Indonesia	—	1

== See also ==
- Burma Tournament 1995
