= Nathaniel Alquiros =

Filipino association football player

Personal information
- Full name: Nathaniel Andrew Garcia Alquiros
- Date of birth: July 27, 1992 (age 34)
- Place of birth: Philippines
- Height: 1.72 m (5 ft 7 1/2 in)
- Positions: Midfielder; defender

College career
Years	Team	Apps	(Gls)
2011–2016	De La Salle University		

Senior career*
Years	Team	Apps	(Gls)
2011–2023	Stallion Laguna	86	(13)

International career^{‡}
2015	Philippines U23	4	(0)
2017	Philippines	4	(0)
- * Club domestic league appearances and goals as of 11 September 2019 (UTC) ‡ National team caps and goals as of 11 September 2019 (UTC)

Nathaniel Andrew Garcia Alquiros (born 27 July 1992) is a former professional footballer who last played as a midfielder for Philippines Football League club Stallion Laguna and the Philippines national team.

== Collegiate career ==
Nathaniel played for the football team of his college, De La Salle University in the UAAP.

== Career ==
=== Stallion Laguna ===
Alquiros spent his professional career with Stallion Laguna.

=== Philippines U-23 ===
In March 2015, Alquiros received a call-up for Philippines U-23 to compete at the 2016 AFC U-23 Championship qualification that was held in Thailand. On 31 March 2015, He made his debut for the Philippines U-23 team in a 3–1 defeat against Cambodia U-23.

Alquiros was part of the Philippines U-23 squad that competed in the 2015 SEA Games.

=== Philippines ===
In December 2017, he took part at the 2017 CTFA International Tournament though the squad that played in the friendly tournament in Taiwan was mentored by Marlon Maro in lieu of regular head coach Thomas Dooley. Alquiros made his debut for the Philippines in a 1–0 loss against Timor Leste.

In October 2018, Alquiros was once again called up for the Philippines, he was included in the final 21-man squad that will participate in the 2018 Bangabandhu Cup.

== Career statistics ==
=== Club ===
As of 7 August 2022.

Club	Season	League			Cup		Total	
Club	Season	Division	Apps	Goals	Apps	Goals	Apps	Goals
Stallion Laguna	2017	PFL	26	1	—		26	1
Stallion Laguna	2018	PFL	23	5	5	0	28	5
Stallion Laguna	2019	PFL	22	6	2	1	24	7
Stallion Laguna	2020	PFL	3	0	—		3	0
Stallion Laguna	2021	PFL	—		3	0	3	0
Stallion Laguna	2022—23	PFL	0	0	4	0	4	0
Career total			74	12	10	1	88	13
