= Ros Kungsomrach =

Cambodian footballer (born 1994)

Ros Kungsomrach រស់ គង់សំរេច
Personal information
- Date of birth: January 21, 1994 (age 32)
- Place of birth: Cambodia
- Height: 1.77 m (5 ft 9 1/2 in)
- Position: Defender

Senior career*
| Years | Team | Apps | (Gls) |
| 2010–2023 | Preah Khan Reach Svay Rieng | | |
| 2023–2024 | Tiffy Army | 10 | (0) |

International career^{‡}
| 2011-2018 | Cambodia national U16 - U19 - U22 Big team and Cambodia all star | | |
| 2011 | [[Cambodia national under U 16- U 22 football team|Cambodia Big team ] | 1 | (0) |
| 2011–2018 | Cambodia | 8 | (8) |
- * Club domestic league appearances and goals ‡ National team caps and goals as of 13 February 2018

Ros Kungsomrach (Khmer: រស់ គង់សំរ៉េច born 21 January 1994) is a former Cambodian footballer who played as a defender.

== International career ==
He made his debut in a friendly match against Hong Kong national football team on 6 October 2016.
