= Nguyễn Hữu Dũng =

Vietnamese footballer

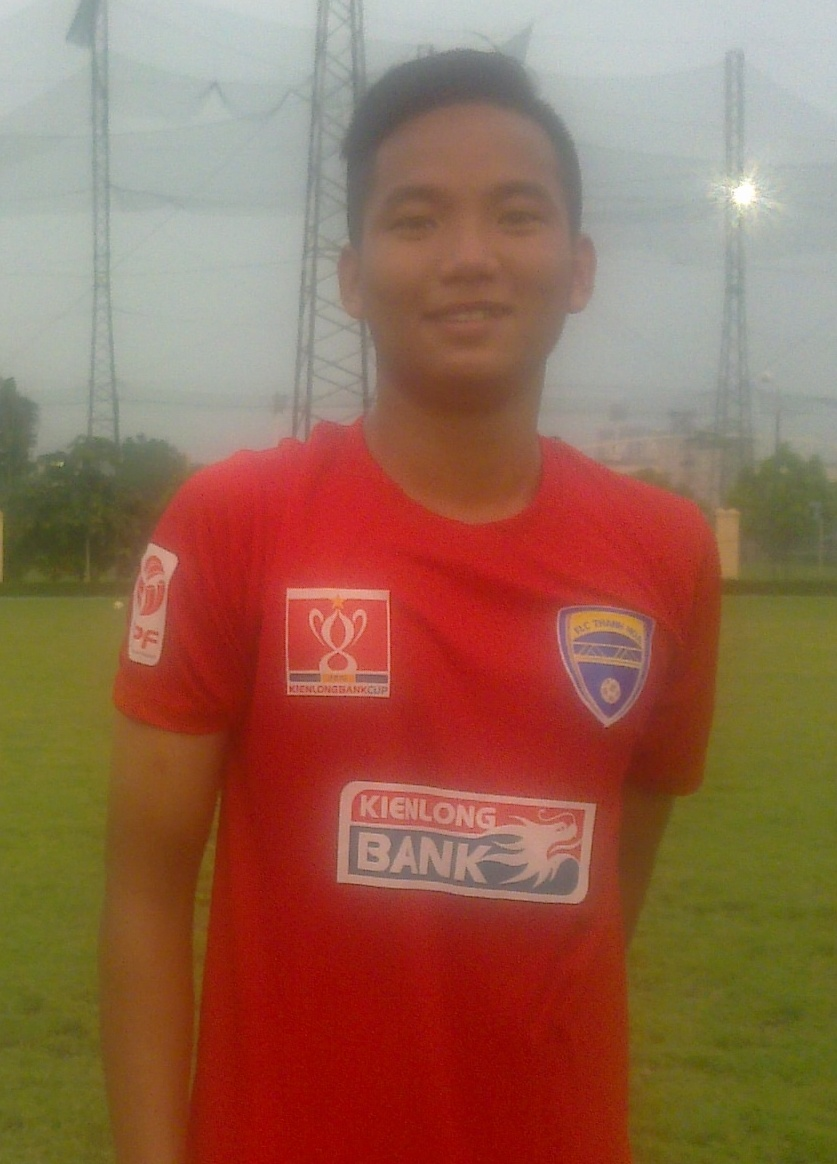

Personal information
- Full name: Nguyễn Hữu Dũng
- Date of birth: August 28, 1995 (age 31)
- Place of birth: Đông Cương, Thanh Hóa, Vietnam
- Height: 1.71 m (5 ft 7 in)
- Position: Central midfielder

Team information
- Current team: Becamex Hồ Chí Minh City
- Number: 22

Youth career
- 2007–2014: Thanh Hoa

Senior career*
| Years | Team | Apps | (Gls) |
| 2014–2023 | Thanh Hóa | 98 | (3) |
| 2018–2019 | → Cần Thơ (loan) | 9 | (0) |
| 2023–2025 | SHB Đà Nẵng | 29 | (1) |
| 2025– | Becamex Hồ Chí Minh City | 0 | (0) |
| 2026– | Đông Á Thanh Hóa | 3 | (0) |

International career^{‡}
| 2015–2017 | Vietnam U23 | 15 | (5) |
| 2016–2017 | Vietnam | 1 | (0) |
- * Club domestic league appearances and goals as of 7 June 2026 ‡ National team caps and goals as of 10 October 2017 (UTC)

Nguyễn Hữu Dũng (born 28 August 1995) is a Vietnamese professional footballer who plays as a central midfielder for V.League 1 club Đông Á Thanh Hóa.

== Honours ==
Đông Á Thanh Hóa

- Vietnamese Cup: 2023

SHB Đà Nẵng

- V.League 2: 2023–24

Vietnam U23

- SEA Games Bronze medal: 2015
