= Marlon Maro =

Filipino football coach & player (born 1965)

Personal information
- Date of birth: June 21, 1965 (age 61)
- Place of birth: Dumaguete, Philippines
- Position: Defender

Senior career*
Years	Team	Apps	(Gls)
- Philippine Navy

International career
- Philippines

Managerial career
- 1999–2007: Philippines (women's)
- 2008–2009: Philippines (HWC)
- –: College of Saint Benilde
- 2011–2012: Philippine Navy
- ~2013: Philippines (U18)
- 2015–2017: Philippines U-23
- 2017–2018: Davao Aguilas
- 2017: Philippines
- 2021: Philippines (women's)
- * Club domestic league appearances and goals

Marlon Maro (born June 21, 1965) is a Filipino football coach and former international football player. He was the head coach of the Philippines women's national football team in 2021.

== Club career ==
Maro played as a player for US.

== International career ==
Marlon Maro played as a defender for the Philippine national team. He was part of the 1991 squad that reached the semifinals of the Southeast Asian Games; the highest achievement of the senior team at said tournament before the football at the games became an under-23 tournament in 2001. At the 1993 Southeast Asian Games, Marlon Maro was designated as the captain of the national team.

== Coaching career ==
=== Collegiate ===
==== College of St. Benilde ====
Maro has coached the football team of the College of Saint Benilde which plays at the NCAA Football Championship. He led the collegiate team to its first NCAA title at the 2009–10 season ending San Beda College eight-year championship winning streak.

=== Club ===
==== Philippine Navy ====
During the off-season of the United Football League in 2011, Marlon Maro was hired as head coach of Philippine Navy. Maro brought in civilian players, with some coming from San Beda College in an effort to boost the squad.

==== Davao Aguilas ====
Maro was hired in an interim basis in September 2017 to serve as head coach of the Davao Aguilas F.C. replacing Gary Phillips. His first match leading the Davao Aguilas was the 1–1 draw with Ceres-Negros F.C. In May 2018, Maro tendered his resignation and was replaced by his assistant, Melchor Anzures.

=== Philippine national teams ===
==== Men's national team ====
Maro took charge of a Philippines national football team that participated at the 2017 CTFA International Tournament in Taiwan. Maro's staff for the tournament to be held in December 2017 consists of team manager, Jefferson Cheng and assistant coach Randolfo Clarino, Marlon Piñero, Ronoel Garfin, and Ramonito Carreon. The Philippine Football Federation (PFF) planned to send the U22 national team which Maro is also head coach but decided to add a select number of senior players from Davao Aguilas and Stallion Laguna.

The lineup for the national team to be guided by Maro was already assembled by the PFF in November 2017 when the national team under regular coach Dooley and team manager Dan Palami was in Nepal for the 2019 AFC Asian Cup qualifiers.

The national team under his helm won 3–1 over Laos, but later lost 0–3 to host Chinese Taipei, and 0–1 to Timor-Leste.

==== Women's national team ====
Maro coached the Philippine women's national team from 2001 to 2007. On July 10, 2021, the Philippine Football Federation announced that they have appointed Maro to lead the national team again starting at the 2022 AFC Women's Asian Cup qualifiers. This was due to a need for a full-time coach with Maro's predecessor Marnelli Dimzon also being the coach of Far Eastern University's women's team.

Maro would help the Philippines qualify for the 2022 AFC Women's Asian Cup. After the successful qualifiers stint he was appointed as head of the PFF Coaching Education department in October 2021. Alen Stajcic succeeded Maro.

==== U18 and U23 youth national teams ====
At the 2013 Kanga Cup, under the club name Carranz F.C., the Philippine U18 team, led by Maro, won the U18 male division of the youth tournament beating Capital Football Senior NTC in the finals; 1–0.

For the under-23 national team's stint at the 2015 Southeast Asian Games, Maro was appointed head coach to lead the team, taking over from Australian Jimmy Fraser, as head coach.

==== Homeless World Cup team ====
Marlon Maro, led the 2008 and 2009 Philippine squads that participated at the Homeless World Cup, a football competition for street children of several countries.

=== Other involvements in football ===
Along with Aris Caslib, Maro organized the Ang Liga, an annual inter-collegiate football tournament in 2003.

== Honours ==
College of St. Benilde

- NCAA Football Championship Champions: 2009–10

Carranz F.C. (Philippine U18)

- Kanga Cup U18 Champions: 2013

== Military career ==
Maro has served with the Philippine Navy retiring in 2008 with the rank of Sergeant.
