= Um Sereyroth =

Cambodian footballer

Um Sereyroth អ៊ំ សេរីរ័ត្ន
Personal information
- Full name: Um Sereyroth
- Date of birth: September 25, 1997 (age 29)
- Place of birth: Phnom Penh, Cambodia
- Height: 1.83 m (6 ft 0 in)
- Position: Goalkeeper

Team information
- Current team: Royal Cambodian Armed Forces
- Number: 22

Senior career*
| Years | Team | Apps | (Gls) |
| 2013– | Royal Cambodian Armed Forces | | |
| 2013–2014 | → Asia Europe University (loan) | | |
| 2022 | → Preah Khan Reach Svay Rieng (loan) | 0 | (0) |

International career^{‡}
| 2013–2015 | Cambodia U-19 | 7 | (0) |
| 2015–2017 | Cambodia U-22 | 10 | (0) |
| 2015 | Cambodia U-23 | 4 | (0) |
| 2015–2017 | Cambodia | 20 | (0) |

Managerial career
- 2024–: Cambodia U-19 (Goalkeeper coach)
- * Club domestic league appearances and goals ‡ National team caps and goals as of 26 March 2017

Um Sereyroth (Khmer: អ៊ុំ សេរីរត្ន័ born 25 September 1997) is a Cambodian footballer who plays for Royal Cambodian Armed Forces in the Cambodian Premier League and also Cambodia national football team. His older brother Um Vichet is also a footballer who also plays as a goalkeeper.

== International career ==
Sereyroth was a member of Cambodia's squad at the 2015 Southeast Asian Games football tournament, playing as goalkeeper in all four games. He also played in all three 2016 AFC U-23 Championship qualification matches.

Sereyroth has also played at the senior level in the 2018 World Cup qualification, where he started in both first-round games against Macau as well as a second round 1–0 home defeat to Afghanistan. In 2015, he saved two penalties kicks from Khairul Amri of Singapore in Singapore and from Shinji Okazaki of Japan in Phnom Penh in 2018 FIFA World Cup qualification – AFC second round.

== Honours ==
=== Club ===
National Defense Ministry

- Hun Sen Cup: 2016

=== Individual ===
- Cambodian League Golden Gloves: 2016
- Hun Sen Cup Golden Gloves: 2016
