= Nguyễn Thanh Hiền =

Vietnamese footballer

Personal information
- Full name: Nguyễn Thanh Hiền
- Date of birth: 16 April 1993 (age 33)
- Place of birth: Tam Nông, Đồng Tháp, Vietnam
- Height: 1.75 m (5 ft 9 in)
- Positions: Right back; right winger

Youth career
- 2008–2010: Đồng Tháp

Senior career*
Years	Team	Apps	(Gls)
2011–2016	Đồng Tháp	51	(4)
2016–2021	Than Quảng Ninh	43	(1)

International career^{‡}
2013–2015	Vietnam U23	9	(1)
2014–2015	Vietnam	8	(0)
- * Club domestic league appearances and goals as of 26 June 2018 ‡ National team caps and goals as of 13 October 2015

Nguyễn Thanh Hiền (born 16 April 1993) is a Vietnamese professional footballer who plays as a defender for Than Quảng Ninh in the V.League 1.

== Club career ==
=== Than Quảng Ninh ===
Thanh Hiền joined Than Quang Ninh in February 2016.

== Honours ==
=== Club ===
Dong Thap:

(gold) Winners : V.League 2: 2014

=== International ===
Vietnam U23

(bronze) Third place : Southeast Asian Games: 2015
