= Nub Tola =

Cambodian footballer (1996–2024)

Nub Tola ណុប តុលា
Personal information
- Date of birth: 1 October 1996
- Place of birth: Phnom Penh, Cambodia
- Date of death: 20 November 2024 (aged 28)
- Place of death: S'ang, Kandal, Cambodia
- Height: 1.75 m (5 ft 9 in)
- Positions: Centre-back; striker

Youth career
- 2013: Preah Khan Reach

Senior career*
Years	Team	Apps	(Gls)
2013–2020	Preah Khan Reach Svay Rieng		
2021–2022	Nagaworld	18	(3)
2023	Kirivong Sok Sen Chey	4	(0)
2023–2024	Ministry of Interior FA	8	(1)

International career
2011–2012	Cambodia U16	9	(2)
2013	Cambodia U19	4	(3)
2015	Cambodia U22	12	(1)
2015–2016	Cambodia U23	5	(0)
2014–2017	Cambodia	27	(0)
- * Club domestic league appearances and goals

Nub Tola (Khmer: ណុប តុលា; 1 October 1996 – 20 November 2024) was a Cambodian footballer. Starting his career as a striker, he also played at centre-back for the Cambodian national team under Lee Tae-hoon before transitioning back to striker again.

Tola represented Cambodia at the 2016 AFF Championship, where he scored an own goal against Vietnam.

== Death ==
On 18 November 2024, Tola went missing. His body was found two days later on Anlong Chen island in S'ang, Kandal province. According to his wife Chhim Panhara, Tola had been deeply in debt due to lost bets and committed suicide as a result.
