= Ye Win Aung =

Burmese footballer

Ye' Win Aung
Personal information
- Full name: Ye' Win Aung
- Date of birth: 6 August 1993 (age 33)
- Place of birth: Yangon, Myanmar
- Height: 1.70 m (5 ft 7 in)
- Position: Right back

Team information
- Current team: Yadanarbon
- Number: 17

Youth career
- 2009 – 2011: Yadanarbon Youth Team

Senior career*
Years	Team	Apps	(Gls)
2011 –	Yadanarbon		

International career^{‡}
2014 –	Myanmar	1	(0)
2013 –	Myanmar U-23	5	(1)
- * Club domestic league appearances and goals as of July 2, 2014 ‡ National team caps and goals as of Aungust 28, 2014

Ye' Win Aung (Burmese: ရဲဝင်းအောင်; born 6 August 1993) is a footballer from Burma, and a defender for the Myanmar national football team and Yadanarbon FC. He appeared as a midfielder for silver medalist Myanmar U-23 Team in 2015 SEA Games and scored against the Philippines Team.
