= Ol Ravy =

Cambodian footballer

Ol Ravy អ៊ុល រ៉ាវី
Personal information
- Full name: Ol Ravy
- Date of birth: August 15, 1993 (age 33)
- Place of birth: Phnom Penh, Cambodia
- Height: 1.65 m (5 ft 5 in)
- Position: Midfielder

Senior career*
Years	Team	Apps	(Gls)
2012–2022	National Police Commissary		

International career
2015	Cambodia U-23	?	(0)
2017	Cambodia	1	(0)
- * Club domestic league appearances and goals

Ol Ravy (Khmer: អ៊ុល រ៉ាវី born 15 August 1993) is a former Cambodian footballer who lasted for the National Police Commissary in the Cambodian League and also Cambodia national football team.

== International career ==
He made his first appearance for his home country in the friendly match against India on 22 March 2017.
