= Zon Moe Aung =

Burmese footballer

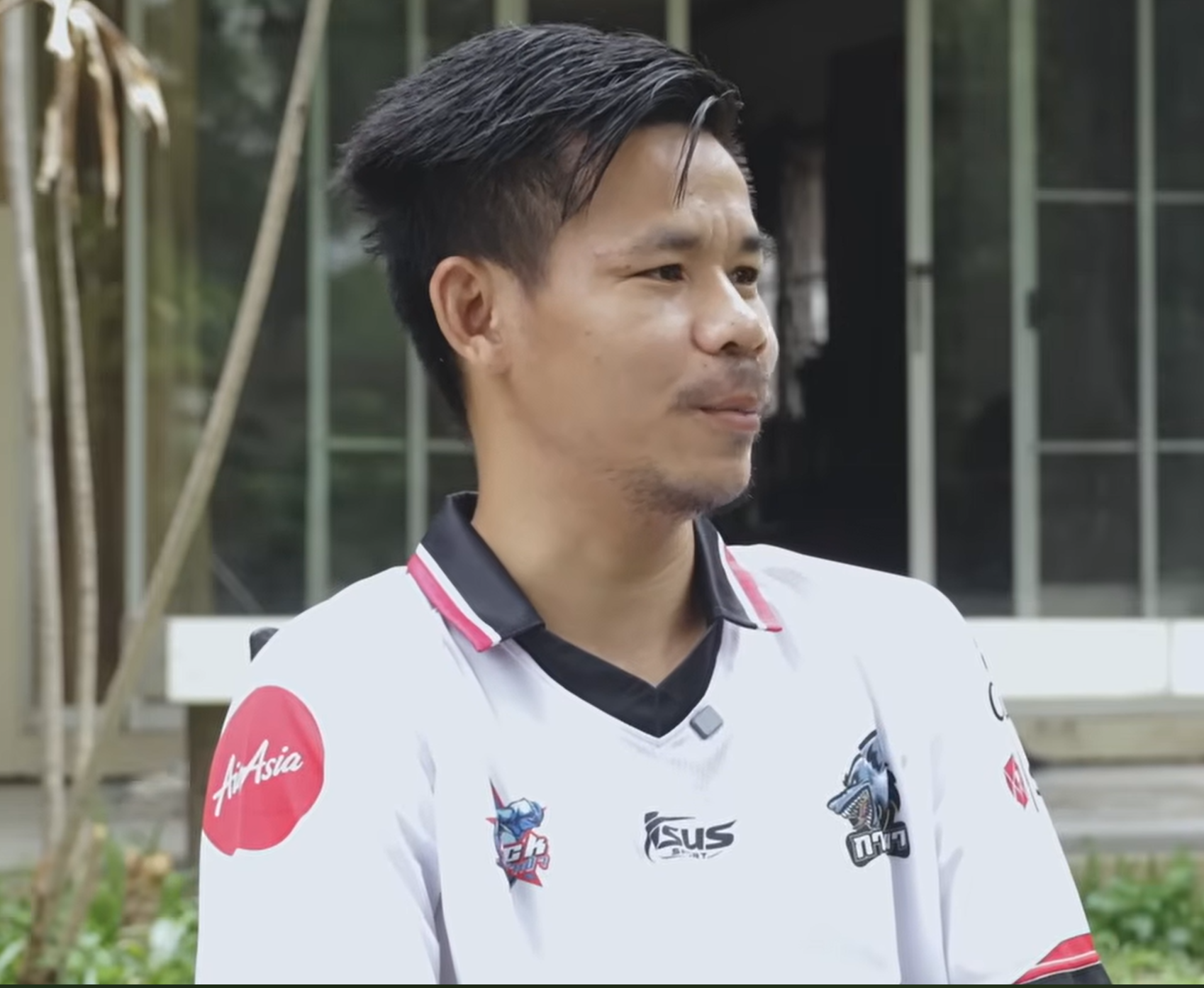

Personal information
- Full name: Zon Moe Aung
- Date of birth: 8 July 1993 (age 33)
- Place of birth: Yangon, Myanmar
- Height: 1.62 m (5 ft 4 in)
- Position: Winger

Team information
- Current team: Samut Prakan City

Youth career
- 2009–2013: Yangon United Youth Team

Senior career*
Years	Team	Apps	(Gls)
2014–2018	Yangon United	10+	(0)
2012–2015	Zwekapin United (loan)	70+	(11+)
2015–2018	Yangon United	18	(3)
2018–2019	Zwekapin United	17	(0)
2020–2021	Sagaing United	7	(0)
2023–	Samut Prakan City	0	(0)

International career^{‡}
2015–	Myanmar U22		
2015–	Myanmar U23		
- * Club domestic league appearances and goals as of 23 April 2020 ‡ National team caps and goals as of 9 July 2016

Zon Moe Aung (Burmese: ဇွန်မိုးအောင်; born 8 July 1993) is a Burmese footballer who plays as a left winger for the Myanmar U-23 football team and Zwekapin United. He was born in Yangon.

== Early career ==
Zon Moe Aung was born in South Okkala, Yangon Division. He played High School Competition when he was three years old. He was selected for School Selection to play High school Competition from Grade 4 to Grade 11. In 2009, Zon Moe Aung was chosen for Yangon United Youth Team. He studied at Yangon Academy and was chosen for Yangon Youth Team. He wanted to be one of Myanmar National Team player. So, he transferred to Zwekapin United on loan in 2012. He showed his surprising talent in Zwekapin United. He played three years in Zwekapin United. In 2015, Yangon United took him back. He was chosen in Yangon United First Line-up because of Yazar Win Thein retired. He played 2015 Myanmar National League and got MNL Champion for first time.

== Club career ==
- 2015 Myanmar National League = Champion

== National career ==
- 2015 SEA Games Football = Silver
