= Ngoy Srin =

Cambodian footballer (born 1994)

Personal information
- Full name: Ngoy Srin
- Date of birth: September 1, 1994 (age 32)
- Place of birth: Takéo, Cambodia
- Height: 1.76 m (5 ft 9 1/2 in)
- Position: Centre-back

Youth career
- Phnom Penh Crown

Senior career*
Years	Team	Apps	(Gls)
2011–2016	Phnom Penh Crown		
2016–2017	Nagaworld	31	(0)
2018–2021	Visakha		
2021	→ Prey Veng (loan)	3	(0)
2022	ISI Dangkor Senchey	4	(0)
2022	Koh Kong	10	(0)

International career^{‡}
2015	Cambodia U-23	5	(0)
2014–2016	Cambodia	11	(0)
- * Club domestic league appearances and goals ‡ National team caps and goals as of June 16, 2015

Ngoy Srin (Khmer: ង៉យ ស្រ៊ីន born 1 September 1994) is a former Cambodian footballer.

== Phnom Penh Crown ==
In 2011, coming through the open trials and joining Phnom Penh Crown is a dream scenario for defender Ngoy Srin, who was born in Takeo but has lived in Koh Kong for many years. He represented his provincial team and signed his first contract as a professional player in December.

== Nagaworld ==
In 2016, he signed a contract with Nagaworld alongside other 3 teammates, Sos Suhana, Sary Matnorotin, and Yok Ary.

== International career ==
Srin made his international debut in a friendly match against Malaysia on 20 September 2014.

== Honours ==
=== Club ===
Phnom Penh Crown

- Cambodian League: 2014
