= Nen Sothearoth =

Cambodian footballer

Nen Sothearoth នេន សុធារ័ត្ន
Personal information
- Full name: Nen Sothearoth
- Date of birth: December 24, 1995 (age 30)
- Place of birth: Phnom Penh, Cambodia
- Height: 1.73 m (5 ft 8 in)
- Position: Defender

Team information
- Current team: Nagaworld
- Number: 23

Youth career
- PKR Svay Rieng FC

Senior career*
Years	Team	Apps	(Gls)
2011–2020	Preah Khan Reach Svay Rieng		
2021–	Nagaworld	71	(2)

International career^{‡}
2012	Cambodia u-21	3	(0)
2014–2017	Cambodia U-23	15	(1)
2012–2018	Cambodia	16	(0)
- * Club domestic league appearances and goals as of 18 May 2026 ‡ National team caps and goals as of 16 July 2015

Nen Sothearoth (Khmer: នេន សុធារ័ត្ន; born 24 December 1995) is a Cambodian footballer who plays as a full back or centre back for Nagaworld.

== International career ==
=== Junior teams ===
Nen Sothearoth played for Cambodia's under-21 team at the 2012 Hassanal Bolkiah Trophy, making his debut in a 2–1 loss to Vietnam. He also played for the under-23 side in the 2015 Southeast Asian games tournament, taking part in all Cambodia's games. On 17 August 2017, he scored a penalty goal after a Vietnamese player handled the ball in penalty box, the only goal that the Cambodian U-22 team scored during the 2017 Southeast Asian Games campaign.

=== Senior team ===
Nen Sothearoth made his international debut in an unofficial friendly match against the Philippines in 2012. He played in his first official matches for Cambodia three years later during qualification for the 2018 World Cup.

== Club career ==
Nen Sothearoth started playing for Svay Rieng in 2011, although he was part of a debated incident in a controversial match against Phnom Penh Crown as in minute 41 he appeared to clear the ball off the line with his hand. Referee Thong Chankethya missed the incident and only gave a corner, the first of four such incidents in the match.
