= Paulo Sitanggang =

Indonesian footballer (born 1995)

Personal information
- Full name: Paulo Oktavianus Sitanggang
- Date of birth: 17 October 1995 (age 31)
- Place of birth: Deli Serdang, Indonesia
- Height: 1.68 m (5 ft 6 in)
- Position: Central midfielder

Team information
- Current team: Madura United
- Number: 17

Youth career
- SSB Kurnia Medan

Senior career*
| Years | Team | Apps | (Gls) |
| 2013–2014 | Jember United | 25 | (6) |
| 2015–2019 | Barito Putera | 122 | (9) |
| 2020 | Persik Kediri | 1 | (0) |
| 2020 | PSMS Medan | 0 | (0) |
| 2021–2023 | Borneo Samarinda | 14 | (0) |
| 2022–2023 | → Persita Tangerang (loan) | 22 | (1) |
| 2023–2024 | RANS Nusantara | 32 | (1) |
| 2024–2025 | PSS Sleman | 25 | (0) |
| 2025– | Madura United | 22 | (0) |

International career
| 2013–2014 | Indonesia U19 | 26 | (3) |
| 2015–2017 | Indonesia U23 | 13 | (1) |
| 2017 | Indonesia | 1 | (0) |
Medal record
Men's football
Representing Indonesia
AFF U-19 Youth Championship
| Winner | 2013 Indonesia |
- * Club domestic league appearances and goals as of 6 September 2026

Paulo Oktavianus Sitanggang (born 17 October 1995) is an Indonesian professional footballer who plays as a central midfielder for Super League club Madura United.

== Club career ==
=== Barito Putera ===
On 21 October 2014, Paulo signed a three-year contract with Barito Putera to commence ahead of the 2015 Indonesia Super League. He made his debut on 4 April 2015, replacing Manahati Lestusen in the 51st minute of a 2–0 victory against Persela Lamongan.

=== Persik Kediri ===
He was signed for Persik Kediri to play in Liga 1. Sitanggang made his league debut on 6 March 2020 in a match against Bhayangkara at the Brawijaya Stadium, Kediri.

=== PSMS Medan ===
In 2021, Sitanggang signed for PSMS Medan to play in the Liga 2 in the 2020 season. This season was suspended on 27 March 2020 due to the COVID-19 pandemic. The season was abandoned and declared void on 20 January 2021.

=== Borneo ===
He was signed for Borneo to play in Liga 1. Sitanggang made his league debut on 10 September 2021 in a match against Persik Kediri at the Pakansari Stadium, Cibinong.

==== Persita Tengerang (loan) ====
Sitanggang was signed for Persita Tangerang to play in Liga 1 in the 2022–23 season, on loan from Borneo. He made his league debut on 25 July 2022 in a match against Persik Kediri at the Indomilk Arena, Tangerang.

=== RANS Nusantara ===
Sitanggang was signed for RANS Nusantara to play in Liga 1 in the 2023–24 season. He made his debut on 3 July 2023 in a match against Persikabo 1973 at the Maguwoharjo Stadium, Sleman.

=== Madura United ===
On 21 June 2025, Sitanggang officially signed Madura United.

== International career ==
He made his international debut for Indonesia national team on 21 March 2017, against Myanmar, where he coming as a substitute.

== Career statistics ==
=== Club ===
As of match played 6 September 2026

| Club | Season | League | | | Cup (Note: Includes Piala Indonesia) | | Continental | | Other (Note: Appearances in Indonesia President's Cup) | | Total | |
| Club | Season | Division | Apps | Goals | Apps | Goals | Apps | Goals | Apps | Goals | Apps | Goals |
|---|---|---|---|---|---|---|---|---|---|---|---|---|
| Barito Putera | 2015 | Indonesia Super League | 3 | 0 | 0 | 0 | – | | 0 | 0 | 3 | 0 |
| Barito Putera | 2016 | ISC A | 28 | 1 | 0 | 0 | – | | 0 | 0 | 28 | 1 |
| Barito Putera | 2017 | Liga 1 | 30 | 2 | 0 | 0 | – | | 2 | 0 | 32 | 2 |
| Barito Putera | 2018 | Liga 1 | 34 | 5 | 0 | 0 | – | | 2 | 0 | 36 | 5 |
| Barito Putera | 2019 | Liga 1 | 27 | 1 | 0 | 0 | – | | 3 | 0 | 30 | 1 |
| Barito Putera | Total | | 122 | 9 | 0 | 0 | – | | 7 | 0 | 129 | 9 |
| Persik Kediri | 2020 | Liga 1 | 1 | 0 | 0 | 0 | – | | 0 | 0 | 1 | 0 |
| PSMS Medan | 2020 | Liga 2 | 0 | 0 | 0 | 0 | – | | 0 | 0 | 0 | 0 |
| Borneo Samarinda | 2021–22 | Liga 1 | 14 | 0 | 0 | 0 | – | | 0 | 0 | 14 | 0 |
| Persita Tangerang (loan) | 2022–23 | Liga 1 | 22 | 1 | 0 | 0 | – | | 1 | 0 | 23 | 1 |
| RANS Nusantara | 2023–24 | Liga 1 | 32 | 1 | 0 | 0 | – | | 0 | 0 | 32 | 1 |
| PSS Sleman | 2024–25 | Liga 1 | 25 | 0 | 0 | 0 | – | | 0 | 0 | 25 | 0 |
| Madura United | 2025–26 | Super League | 21 | 0 | 0 | 0 | – | | 0 | 0 | 21 | 0 |
| Madura United | 2026–27 | Super League | 1 | 0 | 0 | 0 | – | | 0 | 0 | 1 | 0 |
| Career total | | | 238 | 11 | 0 | 0 | 0 | 0 | 8 | 0 | 246 | 11 |

== Honours ==
=== International ===
Indonesia U19

- AFF U-19 Youth Championship: 2013
