= Ye Ko Oo =

Burmese footballer

Personal information
- Full name: Ye Ko Oo
- Date of birth: 20 August 1991 (age 35)
- Place of birth: Myanmar
- Height: 1.64 m (5 ft 5 in)
- Position: Midfielder

Senior career*
Years	Team	Apps	(Gls)
2013–2020	Yadanarbon	117	(5)
Total		117	(5)

International career
2014	Myanmar U22	1	(0)
2015	Myanmar U23	5	(1)
2016–2020	Myanmar	22	(1)
- * Club domestic league appearances and goals

Ye Ko Oo (born 20 August 1994) is a Burmese footballer who plays as a midfielder for Yadanarbon in Myanmar National League. He played for silver medalist Myanmar U23 at the 2015 SEA Games. He has also participated in matches at the 2010 AFC President's Cup, 2011 AFC President's Cup, and 2015 AFC Cup with his club Yadanarbon FC.

== International goals ==
Scores and results are list Myanmar's goal tally first.

No.	Date	Venue	Opponent	Score	Result	Competition
1.	6 June 2016	Thuwunna Stadium, Yangon, Myanmar	Hong Kong	3–0	3–0	2016 AYA Bank Cup
