= Aung Wai Phyo =

Burmese footballer

Aung Phyo Wai
Personal information
- Full name: Aung Phyo Wai
- Date of birth: 29 March 1991 (age 35)
- Place of birth: Shwe Bo, Hinthada District, Ayeyarwady Region, Myanmar
- Height: 1.72 m (5 ft 7 1/2 in)
- Position: Goalkeeper

Team information
- Current team: Nay Pyi Taw

Youth career
- 2009 – 2012: Yangon United Youth Team

Senior career*
Years	Team	Apps	(Gls)
2013 – 2016	Yangon United		
2017–	Nay Pyi Taw		

International career
2014 – Present	Myanmar	1	(0)
- * Club domestic league appearances and goals as of 10 December 2016

Aung Phyo Wai (Burmese: ဆက်ဖြိုးဝေ; born 3 May 1993) is a footballer from Burma, and current play as a goalkeeper for Nay Pyi Taw.

== Honors ==
=== Club ===
- Myanmar National League(1): 2013
