= Shine Thura =

Burmese footballer

Personal information
- Full name: Shine Thura
- Date of birth: 20 March 1996 (age 30)
- Place of birth: Mandalay, Myanmar
- Height: 1.65 m (5 ft 5 in)
- Position: Forward

Team information
- Current team: Southern Myanmar

Youth career
- 2012–2013: Yadanarbon FC

Senior career*
Years	Team	Apps	(Gls)
2014–2018	Yadanarbon FC	8	(2)
2017	→ Samut Sakhon (loan)	1	(0)
2019–2020	Southern Myanmar	19	(4)

International career^{‡}
2013–2014	Myanmar U19	4	(1)
2014–2017	Myanmar U22	9	(2)
2015–	Myanmar	1	(0)
- * Club domestic league appearances and goals as of 24 October 2023 ‡ National team caps and goals as of January 11, 2017

Shine Thura (Burmese: ရှိုင်းသူရ; also spelled Shine Thuya; born 20 March 1996) is a footballer from Burma who plays as a forward for the Myanmar national football team and Samut Sakhon.

== International career ==
Thura made his international debut on 13 October 2015, coming on as a sub for Suan Lam Mang to play the last ten minutes of a 3–1 victory over Laos in a qualification game for the 2018 FIFA World Cup.
