= Pidor Sam Oeun =

Cambodian footballer

Personal information
- Full name: Phai Sam Oeurn
- Date of birth: 20 May 1996 (age 30)
- Place of birth: Phnom Penh, Cambodia
- Height: 1.70 m (5 ft 7 in)
- Position: Full back

Youth career
- Preah Khan Reach

Senior career*
Years	Team	Apps	(Gls)
2013–2024	Preah Khan Reach Svay Rieng		
2021	→ Nagaworld (loan)	16	(0)

International career^{‡}
2015–2017	Cambodia U-22	10	(0)
2015	Cambodia U-23	2	(0)
2015–2017	Cambodia	16	(0)
- * Club domestic league appearances and goals ‡ National team caps and goals as of 19 February 2026

Pidor Sam Oeun (Khmer: ពិដោ សំអឿន [piˈɗao sɑmˈʔɨən]; born 20 May 1996) is a Cambodian football player who currently plays for Preah Khan Reach Svay Rieng in the Cambodian League.

== International career ==
He made his international debut in a Friendly Match against Bhutan on 20 August 2015.
