= Teguh Amiruddin =

Indonesian footballer

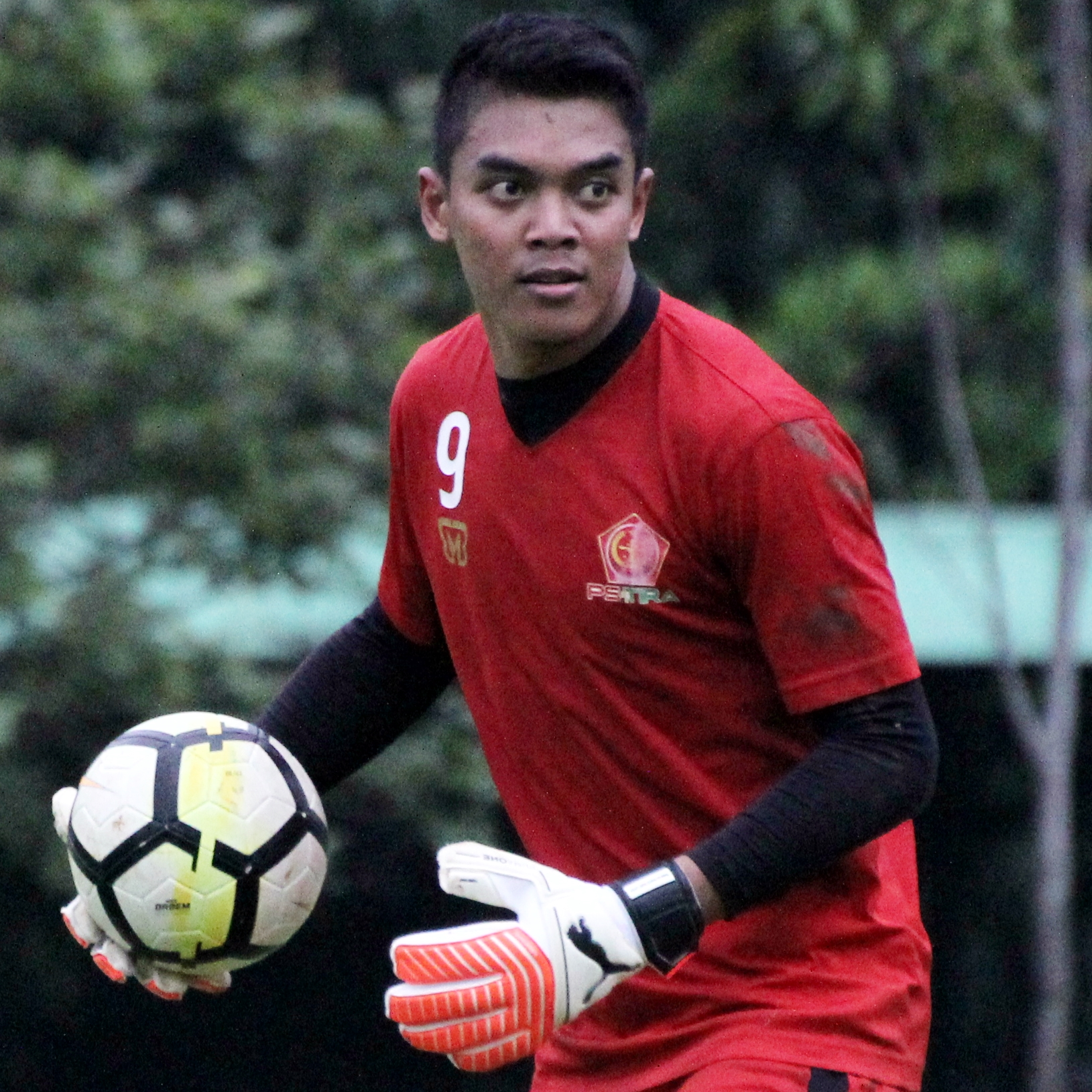
- Amiruddin with TIRA-Persikabo in 2019

Personal information
- Full name: Teguh Amiruddin
- Date of birth: 13 August 1993 (age 33)
- Place of birth: Malang, Indonesia
- Height: 1.83 m (6 ft 0 in)
- Position: Goalkeeper

Team information
- Current team: Persis Solo
- Number: 20

Youth career
- 2006–2011: Arema

Senior career*
Years	Team	Apps	(Gls)
2011–2013	Arema Cronus	0	(0)
2011–2012	→ Persekam Metro (loan)	20	(0)
2013–2014	Perseru Serui	42	(0)
2015	Barito Putera	0	(0)
2016–2020	TIRA-Persikabo	38	(0)
2020–2024	Arema	24	(0)
2024–2026	Semen Padang	8	(0)
2026–	Persis Solo	2	(0)

International career
2014–2015	Indonesia U23	10	(0)
- * Club domestic league appearances and goals as of 11 October 2026

Teguh Amiruddin (born 13 August 1993) is an Indonesian professional footballer who plays as a goalkeeper for Championship club Persis Solo. He is also a second sergeant in the Indonesian Army.

== Club career ==
=== Barito Putera ===
On 10 November 2014, he moved to Barito Putera.

=== TIRA-Persikabo ===
On 1 April 2016, he was signed for TIRA-Persikabo to play in ISC A in the 2016 season. He played there for 4 seasons.

=== Arema ===
He was signed for Arema to play in Liga 1 in the 2020 season. He made his league debut on 2 March 2020 in a match against TIRA-Persikabo at the Pakansari Stadium, Cibinong.

== International career ==
Teguh made his debut for the Indonesia U-23 on 30 March 2014 against Sri Lanka U-23 in the friendly match.

== Career statistics ==
=== Club ===
As of match played 11 October 2026

Club	Season	League			Cup		Other (Note: Appearances in Piala Presiden)		Total	
Club	Season	Division	Apps	Goals	Apps	Goals	Apps	Goals	Apps	Goals
Perseru Serui	2013	Premier Division	22	0	0	0	0	0	22	0
Perseru Serui	2014	Indonesia Super League	20	0	0	0	4 (Note: Appearances in Inter Island Cup)	0	24	0
Perseru Serui	Total		42	0	0	0	4	0	46	0
Barito Putera	2015	Indonesia Super League	0	0	0	0	0	0	0	0
TIRA-Persikabo	2016	ISC A	7	0	0	0	0	0	7	0
TIRA-Persikabo	2017	Liga 1	21	0	0	0	1	0	22	0
TIRA-Persikabo	2018	Liga 1	4	0	0	0	2	0	6	0
TIRA-Persikabo	2019	Liga 1	6	0	0	0	0	0	6	0
TIRA-Persikabo	Total		38	0	0	0	3	0	41	0
Arema	2020	Liga 1	3	0	0	0	0	0	3	0
Arema	2021–22	Liga 1	5	0	0	0	2 (Note: Appearances in Menpora Cup)	0	7	0
Arema	2022–23	Liga 1	9	0	0	0	1	0	10	0
Arema	2023–24	Liga 1	7	0	0	0	0	0	7	0
Arema	Total		24	0	0	0	3	0	27	0
Semen Padang	2024–25	Liga 1	8	0	0	0	0	0	8	0
Semen Padang	2025–26	Super League	0	0	0	0	0	0	0	0
Persis Solo	2026–27	Championship	2	0	0	0	0	0	2	0
Career total			114	0	0	0	10	0	124	0

== Honours ==
=== Club ===
Perseru Serui

- Liga Indonesia Premier Division runner up: 2013

Arema

- Piala Presiden: 2022
