= Muchlis Hadi =

Indonesian footballer

Personal information
- Full name: Muchlis Hadi Ning Syaifulloh
- Date of birth: 26 October 1996 (age 30)
- Place of birth: Mojokerto, Indonesia
- Height: 1.72 m (5 ft 8 in)
- Position: Forward

Youth career
- SSB Sinar Mas
- Persebaya Surabaya
- Domhil Malang
- Benteng Muda

Senior career*
Years	Team	Apps	(Gls)
2013–2016	PSM Makassar	21	(2)
2017–2018	Bhayangkara	5	(0)
2017	→ Semen Padang (loan)	7	(0)
2018–2019	Persib Bandung	6	(1)
2019	→ Bandung United (loan)	7	(1)
Total		46	(4)

International career
2013–2014	Indonesia U19	23	(7)
2015	Indonesia U23	11	(5)

Managerial career
- 2023–: Bhayangkara youth
- 2023–2024: Bhayangkara U20 (assistant coach)
- 2024–2025: Nganjuk Ladang (assistant coach)
- 2025–: Bhayangkara U20 (assistant coach)
Medal record
Men's football
Representing Indonesia
AFF U-19 Youth Championship
Winner	2013 Indonesia
AFF Championship
Runner-up	2016 Myanmar & Philippines	Team
- * Club domestic league appearances and goals

Muchlis Hadi Ning Syaifulloh (born 26 October 1996) is an Indonesian former footballer who plays as a forward.

== Club career ==
=== PSM Makassar ===
On 17 December 2013, Muchlis signed a four-year contract with PSM Makassar. However, in the 2014 season, he was not able to make his debut as being the focus of the Indonesia U-19 team for the 2014 AFC U-19 Championship. In next season, he scored on his debut, a goal coming in the 74th minute against Persiba Balikpapan, after replacing Johan Yoga in the 62nd minute.

=== Bhayangkara F.C. ===
In 2017 he moved to Bhayangkara. The team won 2017 Liga 1 and he was listed as Liga 1 champion although he was loaned to Semen Padang during the mid-season transfer window.

=== Persib Bandung ===
Muchlis joined Persib Bandung in 2018 on a free transfer. He made his debut against PS-TIRA on 23 March 2018 and scored his only goal for the club against Madura United on 9 October 2018 when the team lost 1–2. He was retained for 2019 season but did not make a single appearance for the first half of the season.

=== Bandung United (loan) ===
Muchlis was loaned to Persib's feeder club Bandung United in Liga 2 for a half season to get more playing time. He scored a goal against PSGC Ciamis on 29 August 2019. As Bandung United were relegated to Liga 3, he was released by Persib.

== International career ==
Muchlis was part of Indonesia U-19 that won 2013 AFF U-19 Youth Championship. He made his debut for the Indonesia U-23 on 9 March 2015 against Vietnam U-23, after replacing Adam Alis Setyano in the 82nd minute. He was also called up to the senior team for 2016 AFF Championship, but he did not play a match for the whole tournament.

== Career statistics ==
=== Club ===
Club	Season	League			Piala Indonesia		Asian		Other		Total	
Club	Season	Division	Apps	Goals	Apps	Goals	Apps	Goals	Apps	Goals	Apps	Goals
PSM Makassar	2014	Indonesia Super League	0	0	—						0	0
PSM Makassar	2015	Indonesia Super League	2	1	0	0	—		5	0	7	1
PSM Makassar	2016	Indonesia Soccer Championship	19	1	-						19	1
Bhayangkara	2017	Liga 1	5	0	0	0	-				5	0
Semen Padang (loan)	2017	Liga 1	7	0	0	0	-				7	0
Persib Bandung	2018	Liga 1	6	1	0	0	-				6	1
Persib Bandung	2019	Liga 1	0	0	0	0	-				0	0
Bandung United (loan)	2019	Liga 2	7	1	0	0	-				7	1
Career total			46	4	0	0	—		5	0	51	4

=== International ===
==== International goals ====
Scores and results list the Indonesia's goal tally first.

Indonesia U-23

#	Date	Venue	Opponent	Score	Result	Competition
1.	27 March 2015	Gelora Bung Karno Stadium, Jakarta, Indonesia	Timor-Leste U-23	4–0	5–0	2016 AFC U-23 Championship qualification
2.	29 March 2015	Gelora Bung Karno Stadium, Jakarta, Indonesia	Brunei U-23	2–0	2–0	2016 AFC U-23 Championship qualification
3	6 Juni 2015	Jalan Besar Stadium, Kallang, Singapore	Cambodia U-23	1–0	6–1	2015 SEA Games
4	6 Juni 2015	Jalan Besar Stadium, Kallang, Singapore	Cambodia U-23	3–1	6–1	2015 SEA Games
5	6 Juni 2015	Jalan Besar Stadium, Kallang, Singapore	Cambodia U-23	4–1	6–1	2015 SEA Games

== Honours ==
=== Club ===
Bhayangkara FC

- Liga 1: 2017

=== International ===
Indonesia U-17

- HKFA International Youth Invitation: 2012

Indonesia U-19

- HKFA International Youth Invitation: 2013
- AFF U-19 Youth Championship: 2013

Indonesia

- AFF Championship runner-up: 2016
