= Kaung Sett Naing =

Burmese footballer

Personal information
- Full name: Kaung Sett Naing
- Date of birth: 21 March 1993 (age 33)
- Place of birth: Yangon, Myanmar
- Height: 1.68 m (5 ft 6 in)
- Position: Forward

Team information
- Current team: Sagaing United
- Number: 99

Youth career
- 2010–2013: Yangon United Youth

Senior career*
Years	Team	Apps	(Gls)
2013	Yangon United	0	(0)
2014–2015	→ Magwe (loan)	20	(9)
2016–2017	Yangon United	3	(0)
2016	→ Samut Sakhon (loan)	6	(2)
2018	Samut Sakhon	14	(2)
2019	Sagaing United	1	(0)
2023 - present	Westland FC		

International career^{‡}
2015	Myanmar U23	5	(2)
2016–	Myanmar	4	(0)
- * Club domestic league appearances and goals as of March 23, 2016 ‡ National team caps and goals as of October 5, 2017

Kaung Sett Naing (Kaung Sat Naing) (Burmese: ကောင်းဆက်နိုင် ; born 21 March 1993) was a footballer from Myanmar who plays as a forward for the Myanmar national under-23 football team. Upon retiring from professional football, he is currently residing in Singapore and playing in an amateur football league known as United Asia Football League for Westland FC and simultaneously playing in Myanmar Premiership League Singapore for Musakudo FC.
