= Kyaw Zin Lwin =

Burmese professional footballer (born 1993)

Personal information
- Date of birth: 4 May 1993 (age 33)
- Place of birth: Pyuntaza, Bago, Myanmar
- Height: 1.78 m (5 ft 10 in)
- Position: Right back

Team information
- Current team: Yangon City
- Number: 12

Youth career
- 2011: Magwe Youth Team
- 2012: Mawyawadi Youth Team (Loan)

Senior career*
Years	Team	Apps	(Gls)
2014–2018	Magway	101	(2)
2019–2020	Ayeyawady United	24	(0)
2021–2023	Shan United	45	(2)
2024	Dagon Star United		
2025–	Yangon City		

International career
2015	Myanmar U23	6	(2)
2016–	Myanmar	37	(0)
- * Club domestic league appearances and goals

Kyaw Zin Lwin (born 4 May 1993) is a Burmese professional footballer who plays as a right back.

== Myanmar national team ==
=== At youth level ===
During the 2015 SEA Games he came on as a substitute in the 65th minute and scored a goal against Indonesia. He played the full tournament, helpung Myanmar win silver medal.

== Personal life ==
Despite the similar name, Lwin is not related to either Kyaw Zin Htet or Kyaw Zin Phyo. He left school in the 8th grade to help his family and has been involved in charitable work for the hometown.

== International ==
As of match played 30 December 2022

Appearances and goals by national team
National team	Year	Apps	Goals
Myanmar	2015	5	0
Myanmar	2016	6	0
Myanmar	2017	5	0
Myanmar	2018	4	0
Myanmar	2019	5	0
Myanmar	2021	2	0
Myanmar	2022	7	0
Myanmar	2023	3	0
Total		37	0
