= Phyo Ko Ko Thein =

Burmese footballer

Personal information
- Full name: Phyo Ko Ko Thein
- Date of birth: 24 January 1993 (age 33)
- Place of birth: Myanmar
- Height: 1.80 m (5 ft 11 in)
- Position: Central defender

Team information
- Current team: Ayeyawady United

Senior career*
Years	Team	Apps	(Gls)
- Ayeyawady United

International career^{‡}
2012	Myanmar U22	5	(0)
2015	Myanmar U23	3	(0)
2012–	Myanmar	14	(0)
- * Club domestic league appearances and goals ‡ National team caps and goals as of 28 March 2017

Phyo Ko Ko Thein (Burmese: ဖြိုးကိုကိုသိန်း; born 24 January 1993) is a footballer from Burma, and a midfielder for the Myanmar national football team and Myanmar U23.

He currently plays for Ayeyawady United in Myanmar National League.
