= Lee Tae-hoon (football manager) =

South Korean football manager

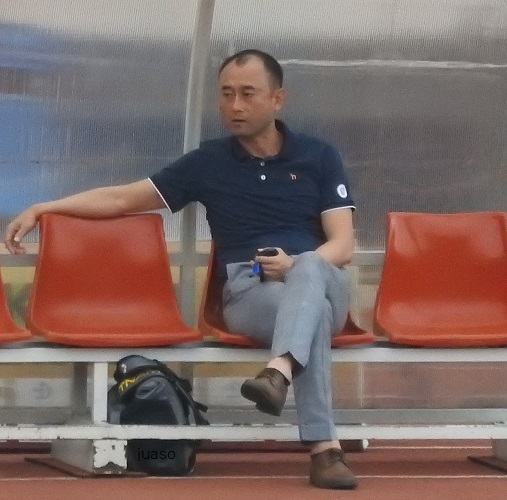
- Lee Tae-hoon in 2019

Personal information
- Date of birth: 7 June 1971 (age 55)
- Place of birth: South Korea

Managerial career
- Years: Team
- 2010–2012: Cambodia
- 2013–2017: Cambodia
- 2018–2019: Hoang Anh Gia Lai (technical director)
- 2019: Vietnam U23 (assistant)
- 2019–2020: Hoang Anh Gia Lai
- 2021: Tiffy Army
- 2021–2022: Visakha
- 2023–: Terengganu (assistant)
- 2023–: Terengganu II

- Lee Tae-hoon
- Hangul: 이태훈
- Hanja: 李泰勳
- RR: I Taehun
- MR: I T'aehun

Lee Tae-hoon (born 7 June 1971) is a South Korean professional football manager.

== Career ==
Since October 2010 until June 2012 he coached the Cambodia national football team. Since July 2013 he again is a head coach of Cambodia U-15 team.
