= Myanmar national under-22 football team =

Myanmar U-22
- Nickname: The Chinthe
- Association: Myanmar Football Federation
- Head coach: Hisashi Kurosaki
- Captain: Zaw Win Thein
- Most caps: Lwin Moe Aung (31)
- Top scorer: Win Naing Tun (10)
- FIFA code: MYA
First colours	Second colours

First international
- Myanmar 0–0 Cambodia (Petaling Jaya, Malaysia; 3 September 2001)

Biggest win
- Myanmar 7–0 Timor-Leste (Yangon, Myanmar; 22 March 2019)

Biggest defeat
- Japan 9–0 Myanmar (Fukuda Denshi Arena, Chiba; 11 March 2015)

AFC U-23 Championship
- Appearances: 1 (first in 2013)
- Best result: Group stage

Southeast Asian Games
- Appearances: 12 (first in 2001)
- Best result: Runners-up (2007, 2015)
Medal record
Myanmar national under-22 football team
Medal record
U-23 Southeast Asian Championship
Bronze medal – third place	2001 Malaysia	Team
Silver medal – second place	2007 Thailand	Team
Bronze medal – third place	2011 Indonesia	Team
Silver medal – second place	2015 Singapore	Team
Merdeka Tournament
Silver medal – second place	2013 Malaysia	Team

The Myanmar national under-22 football team is the under-23 football team that represents Myanmar at the international football competitions. It is controlled by the Myanmar Football Federation.

== Competition records ==
=== Olympic Games record ===
Olympic Games Record
Year	Round	Position	GP	W	D	L	GS	GA
(Spain) 1992	did not enter							
(United States) 1996	did not enter							
(Australia) 2000	did not qualify							
(Greece) 2004	did not qualify							
(China) 2008	did not qualify							
(United Kingdom) 2012	did not qualify							
(Brazil) 2016	did not qualify							
(Japan) 2020	did not qualify							
(France) 2024	did not qualify							
Total	0/8	-	0	0	0	0	0	0

- Since 1992, football at the Summer Olympics changes into Under-23 tournament.

=== AFC U-23 Asian Cup record ===
AFC U-23 Asian Cup								AFC U-23 Asian Cup Qualifications Record					
Year	Round	GP	W	D	L	GF	GA	GP	W	D	L	GS	GA
(Oman) 2013	Group stage	3	0	0	3	1	13	5	4	1	0	16	5
(Qatar) 2016	did not qualify							3	2	0	1	6	6
(China) 2018	did not qualify							3	2	0	1	5	3
(Thailand) 2020	did not qualify							3	2	0	1	11	7
(Uzbekistan) 2022	did not qualify							2	1	0	1	1	2
(Qatar) 2024	did not qualify							2	0	1	1	1	4
(Saudi Arabia) 2026	did not qualify							3	0	1	2	2	4
(Japan) 2028	To be determined							To be determined					
Total	1/8	3	0	0	3	1	13	21	11	2	7	42	31

AFC U-23 Championship history
Year	Round	Date	Opponent	Result	Stadium
(Oman) 2013	Group stage	11 January 2014	Oman	L 0–4	Sultan Qaboos Sports Complex, Muscat
(Oman) 2013	Group stage	13 January 2014	South Korea	L 0–3	Royal Oman Police Stadium, Muscat
(Oman) 2013	Group stage	15 January 2014	Jordan	L 1–6	Royal Oman Police Stadium, Muscat

=== Asian Games record ===
Asian Games Record
Year	Round	GP	W	D	L	GF	GA
(South Korea) 2002	Did not participate						
(Qatar) 2006	Did not participate						
(China) 2010	Did not participate						
(South Korea) 2014	Did not participate						
(Indonesia) 2018	Group Stage	3	1	1	1	3	4
(China) 2022	Round 16	4	1	1	2	2	12
(Japan) 2026	Did not participate						
Total							

- Since 2002, football at the Asian Games changes into Under-23 tournament.

Asian Games History
Season	Round	Opponent	Scores	Result	Venue
2018	Group F	North Korea	1–1	Draw	Cikarang, Indonesia
2018	Group F	Saudi Arabia	0–3	Loss	Cikarang, Indonesia
2018	Group F	Iran	2–0	Win	Bekasi, Indonesia

=== SEA Games record ===
SEA Games Record
Year	Round	Position	GP	W	D*	L	GS	GA
(Malaysia) 2001	Third Place	3/9	6	3	1	2	8	5
(Vietnam) 2003	Fourth Place	4/8	5	2	1	2	11	6
(Philippines) 2005	Round 1	8/9	4	0	1	3	2	5
(Thailand) 2007	Runners-up	2/8	5	1	2	2	8	7
(Laos) 2009	Round 1	6/9	3	1	1	1	5	4
(Indonesia) 2011	Third Place	3/11	7	5	1	1	17	4
(Myanmar) 2013	Round 1	5/10	4	2	1	1	7	3
(Singapore) 2015	Runners-up	2/11	6	4	1	1	16	11
(Malaysia) 2017	Fourth Place	4/11	6	3	0	3	13	8
(Philippines) 2019	Third Place	3/11	6	3	2	1	12	10
(Vietnam) 2021	Round 1	5/10	4	2	0	2	7	8
(Cambodia) 2023	Fourth Place	4/11	6	3	0	3	5	11
(Thailand) 2025	Round 1							
Total	12/12	Runners-up	62	29	11	22	111	82

Since 2001, Football at the South East Asian Games changes into Under-23 tournament.
*Denotes draws include knockout matches decided on penalty kicks.
**Red border colour indicates tournament was held on home soil.

== Recent results and forthcoming fixtures ==
Win Draw Lose

== Coaching staff ==
Position	Name
Technical Director	(Japan) Michiteru Mita
Head Coach	(Japan) Hisashi Kurosaki
Assistant coach	(Myanmar) Min Thu (Myanmar) Zaw Win Tun
Goalkeeping coach	(Japan) Shinsuke Yoshioka
Fitness coach	(Japan) Yukinori Motohashi
Video analyst	(Myanmar) Saw Ye Mon
Media officer	(Myanmar) Zaw Minn Htike
Doctor	(Myanmar) Kyaw Thant Zin
Physiotherapist	(Myanmar) Thura Toe
Interpreter	(Myanmar) Takuya Toe Aung
Kit manager	(Myanmar) Thet Swe

== Players ==
=== Current squad ===
The following 23 players were called up for the 2025 SEA Games football tournament.

Players highlighted in italics had been called up to the Myanmar national team during the Asian Cup qualifiers but will join the training camp during U22 competitions.

No.	Pos.	Player	Date of birth (age)	Caps	Goals	Club
	GK	Hein Htet Soe	21 June 2003 (age 23)	8	0	(Myanmar Football Federation) Ayeyawady United
	GK	Khant Min Thant	20 June 2004 (age 22)	3	0	(Myanmar Football Federation) Thitsar Arman
	GK	Aung Pyae Phyo	21 June 2003 (age 23)	2	0	(Myanmar Football Federation) Dagon Star United
	DF	Htoo Wai Yan		9	0	(Myanmar Football Federation) Mahar United
	DF	Kaung Htet Paing	27 May 2004 (age 22)	7	1	(Myanmar Football Federation) Yangon United
	DF	Latt Wai Phone	4 May 2005 (age 21)	6	0	(Myanmar Football Federation) Yangon United
	DF	Mar Ti No		5	0	(Myanmar Football Federation) ISPE
	DF	Samuel Ngai Kee	20 October 2005 (age 20)	1	0	(Myanmar Football Federation) Yadanarbon
	DF	Phyo Pyae Sone	28 June 2006 (age 20)	0	0	(Myanmar Football Federation) Yadanarbon
	MF	Zaw Win Thein	1 March 2003 (age 23)	22	0	(Myanmar Football Federation) Yangon United
	MF	Arkar Kyaw	7 February 2003 (age 23)	16	0	(Myanmar Football Federation) Yangon United
	MF	Swan Htet	12 April 2005 (age 21)	13	3	(Myanmar Football Federation) Dagon Star United
	MF	Moe Swe	31 May 2003 (age 23)	12	1	(Myanmar Football Federation) Dagon Star United
	MF	Ye Yint Phyo	26 July 2003 (age 23)	10	0	(Myanmar Football Federation) Ayeyawady United
	MF	Shine Wanna Aung	15 March 2006 (age 20)	9	3	(Myanmar Football Federation) Thitsar Arman
	MF	Oakkar Naing	18 November 2003 (age 22)	9	0	(Myanmar Football Federation) Yangon United
	MF	Sa Khant Chaw	15 July 2005 (age 21)	9	0	(Myanmar Football Federation) Dagon Star United
	MF	Myat Phone Khant		9	0	(Myanmar Football Federation) Thitsar Arman
	MF	Aung Thiha	6 July 2004 (age 22)	0	0	(Myanmar Football Federation) Dagon Star United
	FW	Than Toe Aung	15 July 2003 (age 23)	12	1	(Myanmar Football Federation) Hantharwaddy United
	MF	Min Maw Oo	6 March 2005 (age 21)	12	1	(Myanmar Football Federation) Thitsar Arman
	FW	Saw Myo Zaw		5	0	(Myanmar Football Federation) Thitsar Arman
	FW	Thurain Tun	22 August 2005 (age 21)	0	0	(Portuguese Football Federation) Esperança de Lagos

== Honours ==
=== Regional ===
- AFF U23 Championship
  - Third Place (1): 2005
- Football at the Southeast Asian Games

- Silver medal (2): 2007, 2015

- Bronze medal (3): 2001, 2011, 2019

=== Other awards ===
- Myanmar Grand Royal Challenge Cup

- Winners (1): 2005

- Runners-up (1) 2006

- Pestabola Merdeka

- Runners-up (1): 2013

- KBZ Bank Cup U-22
  - Runners-up (1): 2017
- Alpine Cup U-23
  - Runners-up (1): 2018

== See also ==
- Football in Myanmar
- Myanmar Football Federation
- Myanmar national football team
- Myanmar women's national football team
- Myanmar National League
