= 2018 AFF Championship knockout stage =

The knockout stage was the second and final stage of the 2018 AFF Championship, following the group stage. It was played from 1 to 15 December with the top two teams from each group (two in total) advancing to the knockout stage to compete in a single-elimination tournament. Each tie was played on a home-and-away two-legged basis. The away goals rule, extra time and penalty shoot-out were used to decide the winner if necessary.

Vietnam won 3–2 on aggregate against Malaysia in the final to win their second title.

== Qualified teams ==
The top two placed teams from each of the two groups advanced to the knockout stage. In Group A, Vietnam secured the group top spots with 10 points after defeating Cambodia by 3–0 in their last match while Malaysia became the group runners-up with 9 points after beating Myanmar with similar scores of 3–0. Meanwhile in Group B, Thailand secured the group top spots with 10 points after defeating Singapore by 3–0 in their last match while Philippines became the group runners-up with 8 points after drawing 0–0 against Indonesia.

Group	Winners	Runners-up
A	Vietnam	Malaysia
B	Thailand	Philippines

== Schedule ==
The schedule of each round was as follows.

Round	First leg	Second leg
Semi-finals	1–2 December 2018	5–6 December 2018
Final	11 December 2018	15 December 2018

== Bracket ==
Semi-finals
A2	Malaysia (a)	0	2	2
B1	Thailand	0	2	2
B2	Philippines	1	1	2
A1	Vietnam	2	2	4

Final
A2	Malaysia	2	0	2
A1	Vietnam	2	1	3

Scores after extra time are indicated by (a.e.t.), and penalty shoot-out are indicated by (pen.).

== Semi-finals ==
Team 1	Agg.	Team 2	1st leg	2nd leg
Malaysia	2–2	Thailand	0–0	2–2
Philippines	2–4	Vietnam	1–2	1–2

=== First leg ===
==== Malaysia vs Thailand ====
1 December 2018
20:45 UTC+8

Malaysia	0–0	Thailand
	Report (AFFSZ); Report (AFF)

Bukit Jalil National Stadium, Kuala Lumpur
Attendance: 87,545
Referee: Ahmed Al-Kaf (Oman)

Malaysia	Thailand

GK	1	Farizal Marlias
RB	4	Syahmi Safari
CB	7	Aidil Zafuan Radzak
CB	3	Shahrul Saad
LB	6	Syazwan Andik		(substituted off) 72'
RM	13	Mohamadou Sumareh		(substituted off) 64'
CM	14	Syamer Kutty Abba
CM	12	Akram Mahinan	(yellow card) 21'
LM	11	Safawi Rasid	(yellow card) 42'
SS	9	Norshahrul Idlan Talaha
CF	8	Zaquan Adha Radzak (c)		(substituted off) 81'
Substitutions:
FW	20	Hazwan Bakri		(substituted on) 64'
DF	21	Nazirul Naim		(substituted on) 72'
MF	10	Shahrel Fikri		(substituted on) 81'
Manager:
Tan Cheng Hoe

GK	1	Chatchai Budprom
RB	5	Mika Chunuonsee
CB	4	Chalermpong Kerdkaew (c)
CB	6	Pansa Hemviboon
LB	24	Korrakot Wiriyaudomsiri
CM	17	Tanaboon Kesarat
CM	8	Thitipan Puangchan
CM	29	Sanrawat Dechmitr
RW	14	Nurul Sriyankem		(substituted off) 59'
LW	22	Supachai Jaided		(substituted off) 45'
CF	9	Adisak Kraisorn		(substituted off) 90'
Substitutions:
MF	21	Pokklaw Anan	(yellow card) 75'	(substituted on) 45'
FW	25	Pakorn Prempak		(substituted on) 59'
FW	2	Chananan Pombuppha		(substituted on) 90'
Manager:
(Serbia) Milovan Rajevac

Man of the Match:
Syamer Kutty Abba (Malaysia)

Assistant referees:
Abu Bakar Al-Amri (Oman)
Abdul Hannan Hasim (Singapore)
Fourth official:
Oki Dwi Putra (Indonesia)

Overall
Statistics	Malaysia	Thailand
Goals scored	0	0
Total shots	23	6
Shots on target	2	0
Ball possession	63%	37%
Corner kicks	6	3
Fouls committed	13	10
Offsides	0	2
Yellow cards	2	1
Red cards	0	0

==== Philippines vs Vietnam ====
2 December 2018
19:30 UTC+8

Philippines	1–2	Vietnam
Reichelt 45+2'	Report (AFFSZ); Report (AFF)	Nguyễn Anh Đức 12'; Phan Văn Đức 48'

Panaad Stadium, Bacolod
Attendance: 5,489
Referee: Abdulrahman Al-Jassim (Qatar)

Philippines	Vietnam

GK	15	Michael Falkesgaard
RB	31	Adam Reed		(substituted off) 77'
CB	3	Carli de Murga
CB	33	Álvaro Silva
LB	21	Martin Steuble	(yellow card) 43'
RM	29	Patrick Reichelt
CM	14	Kevin Ingreso	(yellow card) 52'
CM	8	Manuel Ott		(substituted off) 45'
CM	26	Jovin Bedic		(substituted off) 55'
LM	17	Stephan Schröck	(yellow card) 54'
CF	10	Phil Younghusband (c)
Substitutions:
FW	5	Mike Ott		(substituted on) 45'
MF	23	James Younghusband		(substituted on) 55'
MF	19	Curt Dizon		(substituted on) 77'
Manager:
(Sweden) Sven-Göran Eriksson

GK	23	Đặng Văn Lâm
CB	28	Đỗ Duy Mạnh
CB	21	Trần Đình Trọng
CB	3	Quế Ngọc Hải (c)
RWB	8	Nguyễn Trọng Hoàng
LWB	5	Đoàn Văn Hậu
CM	19	Nguyễn Quang Hải	(yellow card) 21'	(substituted off) 89'
CM	16	Đỗ Hùng Dũng
CM	15	Phạm Đức Huy
CF	20	Phan Văn Đức		(substituted off) 80'
CF	11	Nguyễn Anh Đức		(substituted off) 65'
Substitutions:
FW	25	Hà Đức Chinh		(substituted on) 65'
FW	14	Nguyễn Công Phượng		(substituted on) 80'
MF	29	Nguyễn Huy Hùng		(substituted on) 89'
Manager:
(South Korea) Park Hang-seo

Man of the Match:
Phan Văn Đức (Vietnam)

Assistant referees:
Saoud Al-Maqaleh (Qatar)
Bambang Syamsudar (Indonesia)
Fourth official:
Nazmi Nasaruddin (Malaysia)

Overall
Statistics	Philippines	Vietnam
Goals scored	1	2
Total shots	9	12
Shots on target	4	7
Ball possession	54%	46%
Corner kicks	1	1
Fouls committed	15	12
Offsides	2	0
Yellow cards	3	1
Red cards	0	0

=== Second leg ===
==== Thailand vs Malaysia ====
5 December 2018
19:00 UTC+7

Thailand	2–2	Malaysia
Irfan 21' (o.g.); Pansa 63'	Report (AFFSZ); Report (AFF)	Syahmi 28'; Norshahrul 71'

Rajamangala Stadium, Bangkok
Attendance: 46,157
Referee: Adham Makhadmeh (Jordan)

Thailand	Malaysia

GK	1	Chatchai Budprom
RB	13	Philip Roller	(yellow card) 38'	(substituted off) 76'
CB	4	Chalermpong Kerdkaew (c)
CB	6	Pansa Hemviboon
LB	24	Korrakot Wiriyaudomsiri	(yellow card) 12'
DM	17	Tanaboon Kesarat		(substituted off) 45'
CM	8	Thitipan Puangchan	(yellow card) 74'
CM	29	Sanrawat Dechmitr
RW	11	Mongkol Tossakrai		(substituted off) 63'
LW	22	Supachai Jaided
CF	9	Adisak Kraisorn	(yellow card) 57'
Substitutions:
MF	21	Pokklaw Anan	(yellow card) 57'	(substituted on) 45'
MF	7	Sumanya Purisai		(substituted on) 63'
FW	14	Nurul Sriyankem		(substituted on) 76'
Manager:
(Serbia) Milovan Rajevac

GK	1	Farizal Marlias
RB	4	Syahmi Safari	(yellow card) 69' (yellow-red card) 90+4'
CB	7	Aidil Zafuan Radzak		(substituted off) 18'
CB	3	Shahrul Saad
LB	21	Nazirul Naim
RM	13	Mohamadou Sumareh
CM	14	Syamer Kutty Abba
CM	12	Akram Mahinan
LM	11	Safawi Rasid		(substituted off) 67'
SS	9	Norshahrul Idlan Talaha		(substituted off) 80'
CF	8	Zaquan Adha Radzak (c)
Substitutions:
DF	17	Irfan Zakaria		(substituted on) 18'
MF	19	Akhyar Rashid		(substituted on) 67'
MF	15	Kenny Pallraj		(substituted on) 80'
Manager:
Tan Cheng Hoe

Man of the Match:
Norshahrul Idlan Talaha (Malaysia)

Assistant referees:
Ahmed Al-Roalle (Jordan)
Malang Nurhadi (Indonesia)
Fourth official:
Thoriq Munir Alkatiri (Indonesia)

Overall
Statistics	Thailand	Malaysia
Goals scored	2	2
Total shots	12	7
Shots on target	3	3
Ball possession	52%	48%
Corner kicks	2	2
Fouls committed	21	19
Offsides	1	0
Yellow cards	5	1
Red cards	0	1

==== Vietnam vs Philippines ====
6 December 2018
19:30 UTC+7

Vietnam	2–1	Philippines
Nguyễn Quang Hải 84'; Nguyễn Công Phượng 87'	Report (AFFSZ); Report (AFF)	J. Younghusband 89'

Mỹ Đình National Stadium, Hanoi
Attendance: 38,816
Referee: Hiroyuki Kimura (Japan)

Vietnam	Philippines

GK	23	Đặng Văn Lâm
CB	28	Đỗ Duy Mạnh
CB	21	Trần Đình Trọng
CB	3	Quế Ngọc Hải (c)
RWB	8	Nguyễn Trọng Hoàng
LWB	5	Đoàn Văn Hậu
CM	15	Phạm Đức Huy	(yellow card) 57'	(substituted off) 85'
CM	6	Lương Xuân Trường		(substituted off) 62'
CM	19	Nguyễn Quang Hải
CF	11	Nguyễn Anh Đức		(substituted off) 74'
CF	20	Phan Văn Đức
Substitutions:
MF	29	Nguyễn Huy Hùng		(substituted on) 62'
FW	22	Nguyễn Tiến Linh		(substituted on) 74'
FW	14	Nguyễn Công Phượng	(yellow card) 85'	(substituted on) 85'
Manager:
(South Korea) Park Hang-seo

GK	16	Patrick Deyto
CB	12	Amani Aguinaldo
CB	33	Álvaro Silva
CB	3	Carli de Murga		(substituted off) 69'
RM	21	Martin Steuble
CM	14	Kevin Ingreso		(substituted off) 83'
CM	31	Adam Reed
LM	7	Iain Ramsay
RW	10	Phil Younghusband (c)
LW	17	Stephan Schröck	(yellow card) 90+2'
CF	29	Patrick Reichelt	(yellow card) 90'
Substitutions:
MF	23	James Younghusband		(substituted on) 69'
FW	26	Jovin Bedic		(substituted on) 83'
Manager:
(Sweden) Sven-Göran Eriksson

Man of the Match:
Nguyễn Quang Hải (Vietnam)

Assistant referees:
Akane Yagi (Japan)
Manoj Kalwani (Singapore)
Fourth official:
Ahmad A'qashah (Singapore)

Overall
Statistics	Vietnam	Philippines
Goals scored	2	1
Total shots	14	5
Shots on target	6	1
Ball possession	45%	55%
Corner kicks	2	3
Fouls committed	17	16
Offsides	3	2
Yellow cards	2	2
Red cards	0	0

== Final ==
Team 1	Agg.	Team 2	1st leg	2nd leg
Malaysia	2–3	Vietnam	2–2	0–1

=== First leg ===
11 December 2018
20:45 UTC+8

Malaysia	2–2	Vietnam
Shahrul 36'; Safawi 61'	Report (AFFSZ); Report (AFF)	Nguyễn Huy Hùng 22'; Phạm Đức Huy 25'

Bukit Jalil National Stadium, Kuala Lumpur
Attendance: 88,482
Referee: Chris Beath (Australia)

Malaysia	Vietnam

GK	1	Farizal Marlias
RB	2	Amirul Azhan		(substituted off) 60'
CB	17	Irfan Zakaria
CB	3	Shahrul Saad
LB	21	Nazirul Naim	(yellow card) 28'	(substituted off) 41'
RM	13	Mohamadou Sumareh
CM	14	Syamer Kutty Abba	(yellow card) 62'
CM	12	Akram Mahinan
LM	11	Safawi Rasid
SS	9	Norshahrul Idlan Talaha		(substituted off) 71'
CF	8	Zaquan Adha Radzak (c)	(yellow card) 38'
Substitutions:
DF	5	Adam Nor Azlin	(yellow card) 53'	(substituted on) 41'
FW	18	Syafiq Ahmad	(yellow card) 65'	(substituted on) 60'
MF	19	Akhyar Rashid		(substituted on) 71'
Manager:
Tan Cheng Hoe

GK	23	Đặng Văn Lâm
CB	3	Quế Ngọc Hải (c)
CB	21	Trần Đình Trọng	(yellow card) 90+2'
CB	28	Đỗ Duy Mạnh	(yellow card) 17'
RM	8	Nguyễn Trọng Hoàng
CM	15	Phạm Đức Huy		(substituted off) 76'
CM	29	Nguyễn Huy Hùng
LM	5	Đoàn Văn Hậu	(yellow card) 59'
RW	19	Nguyễn Quang Hải
LW	20	Phan Văn Đức		(substituted off) 86'
CF	13	Hà Đức Chinh		(substituted off) 53'
Substitutions:
FW	22	Nguyễn Tiến Linh		(substituted on) 53'
FW	14	Nguyễn Công Phượng		(substituted on) 76'
MF	16	Đỗ Hùng Dũng		(substituted on) 86'
Manager:
(South Korea) Park Hang-seo

Man of the Match:
Safawi Rasid (Malaysia)

Assistant referees:
Ronnie Koh Min Kiat (Singapore)
Bambang Syamsudar (Indonesia)
Fourth official:
Muhammad Taqi (Singapore)

Overall
Statistics	Malaysia	Vietnam
Goals scored	2	2
Total shots	8	15
Shots on target	4	4
Ball possession	58%	42%
Corner kicks	4	3
Fouls committed	20	15
Offsides	0	2
Yellow cards	5	3
Red cards	0	0

=== Second leg ===
15 December 2018
19:30 UTC+7

Vietnam	1–0	Malaysia
Nguyễn Anh Đức 6'	Report (AFFSZ); Report (AFF)

Mỹ Đình National Stadium, Hanoi
Attendance: 40,000
Referee: Alireza Faghani (Iran)

Vietnam	Malaysia

GK	23	Đặng Văn Lâm	(yellow card) 9'
CB	28	Đỗ Duy Mạnh	(yellow card) 53'
CB	21	Trần Đình Trọng	(yellow card) 19'
CB	3	Quế Ngọc Hải (c)
RWB	8	Nguyễn Trọng Hoàng	(yellow card) 16'
LWB	5	Đoàn Văn Hậu	(yellow card) 53'
CM	29	Nguyễn Huy Hùng	(yellow card) 29'
CM	16	Đỗ Hùng Dũng		(substituted off) 90+3'
RW	19	Nguyễn Quang Hải
LW	20	Phan Văn Đức		(substituted off) 71'
CF	11	Nguyễn Anh Đức		(substituted off) 81'
Substitutions:
DF	12	Nguyễn Phong Hồng Duy		(substituted on) 71'
FW	13	Hà Đức Chinh		(substituted on) 81'
MF	6	Lương Xuân Trường		(substituted on) 90+3'
Manager:
(South Korea) Park Hang-seo

GK	1	Farizal Marlias
RB	4	Syahmi Safari
CB	7	Aidil Zafuan Radzak	(yellow card) 9'	(substituted off) 76'
CB	3	Shahrul Saad	(yellow card) 36' (yellow-red card) 90+5'
LB	6	Syazwan Andik
RM	11	Safawi Rasid		(substituted off) 83'
CM	14	Syamer Kutty Abba	(yellow card) 40'
CM	12	Akram Mahinan		(substituted off) 85'
LM	13	Mohamadou Sumareh
SS	9	Norshahrul Idlan Talaha
CF	8	Zaquan Adha Radzak (c)	(yellow card) 80'
Substitutions:
FW	18	Syafiq Ahmad	(yellow card) 79'	(substituted on) 76'
MF	19	Akhyar Rashid		(substituted on) 83'
FW	10	Shahrel Fikri		(substituted on) 85'
Manager:
Tan Cheng Hoe

Man of the Match:
Nguyễn Quang Hải (Vietnam)

Assistant referees:
Reza Ebrahim Sokhandan (Iran)
Mohammad Reza Mansouri (Iran)
Fourth official:
Jansen Foo (Singapore)

Overall
Statistics	Vietnam	Malaysia
Goals scored	1	0
Total shots	10	13
Shots on target	3	5
Ball possession	42%	58%
Corner kicks	1	8
Fouls committed	12	19
Offsides	2	0
Yellow cards	6	5
Red cards	0	1
