= 2018 AFF Championship final =

Association football championship series in 2018

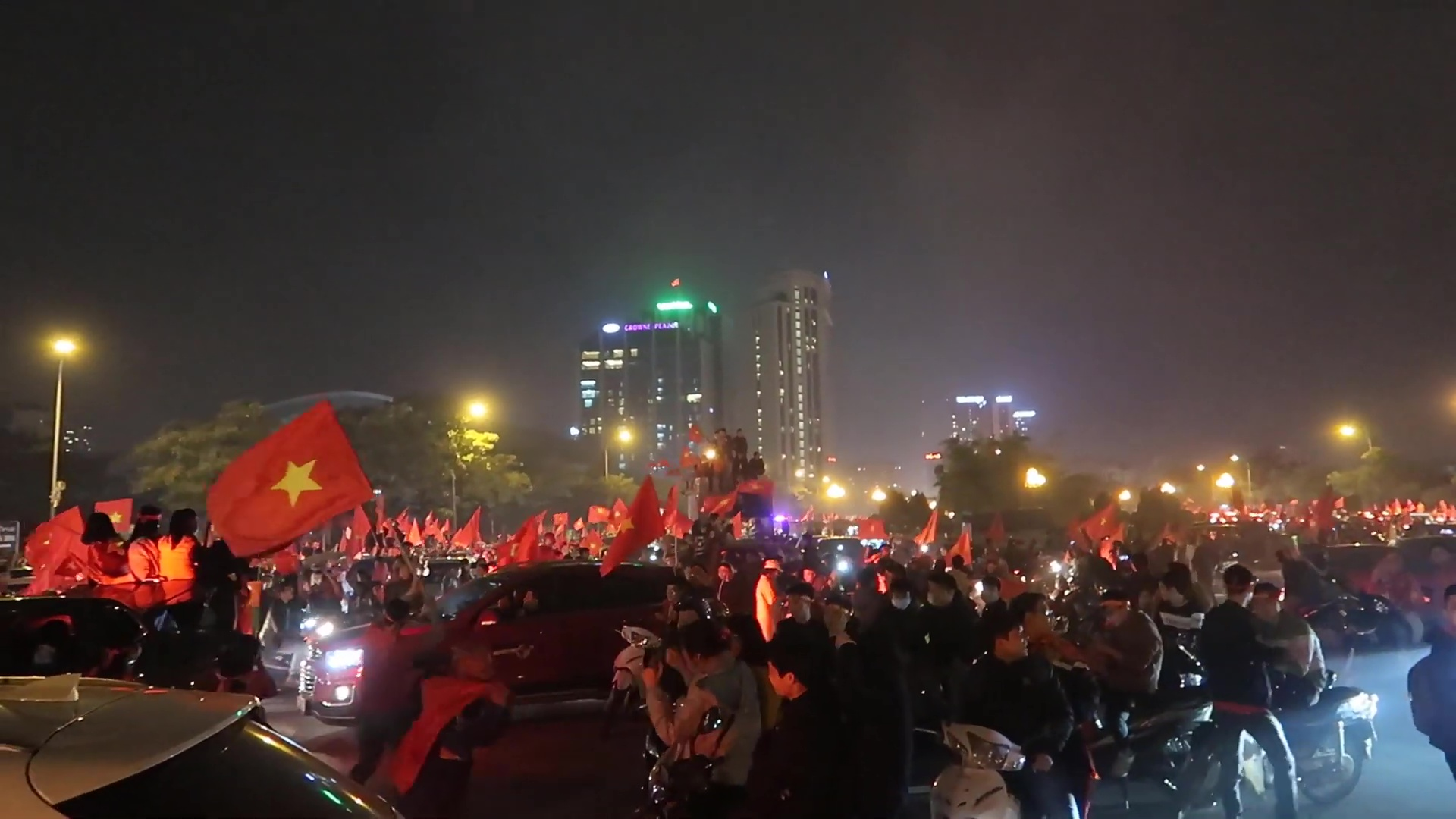
- Hanoi people taking to the streets to celebrate Vietnam's second AFF Championship win.
- Event: 2018 AFF Championship
Malaysia	Vietnam
(Malaysia)	(Vietnam)
2	3
- on aggregate

First leg
Malaysia	Vietnam
2	2
- Date: 11 December 2018
- Venue: Bukit Jalil National Stadium, Kuala Lumpur
- HONOR Man of the Match: Safawi Rasid (Malaysia)
- Referee: Chris Beath (Australia)
- Attendance: 88,482
- Weather: Rainy night 29 °C (84 °F)

Second leg
Vietnam	Malaysia
1	0
- Date: 15 December 2018
- Venue: Mỹ Đình National Stadium, Hanoi
- HONOR Man of the Match: Nguyễn Quang Hải (Vietnam)
- Referee: Alireza Faghani (Iran)
- Attendance: 44,625
- Weather: Colder night 17 °C (63 °F)

The 2018 AFF Championship final was the association football series and the final of the 2018 AFF Championship, the 12th edition of the top-level Southeast Asia football tournament organised by the ASEAN Football Federation (AFF).

The final was contested in two-legged home-and-away series between Malaysia and Vietnam. The first leg was hosted by Malaysia at the Bukit Jalil National Stadium in Kuala Lumpur on 11 December 2018, while the second leg was hosted by Vietnam at the Mỹ Đình National Stadium in Hanoi on 15 December 2018.

Vietnam secured their second title after defeating Malaysia by a 3–2 aggregate score in the two-legged final.

== Background ==
Based on previous records, Malaysia had reached the AFF Championship final three times (1996, 2010 and 2014) while Vietnam had reached the AFF Championship final two times (1998 and 2008). The two sides last met on 23 November 2016 in the group stage of the previous 2016 AFF Championship. Based on the latest rankings released by FIFA World Rankings on 29 November 2018, Malaysia was ranked 167 while Vietnam ranked 100. Both teams had already won their first trophy of the tournament, with Vietnam winning in 2008 and Malaysia in 2010.

== Venue ==
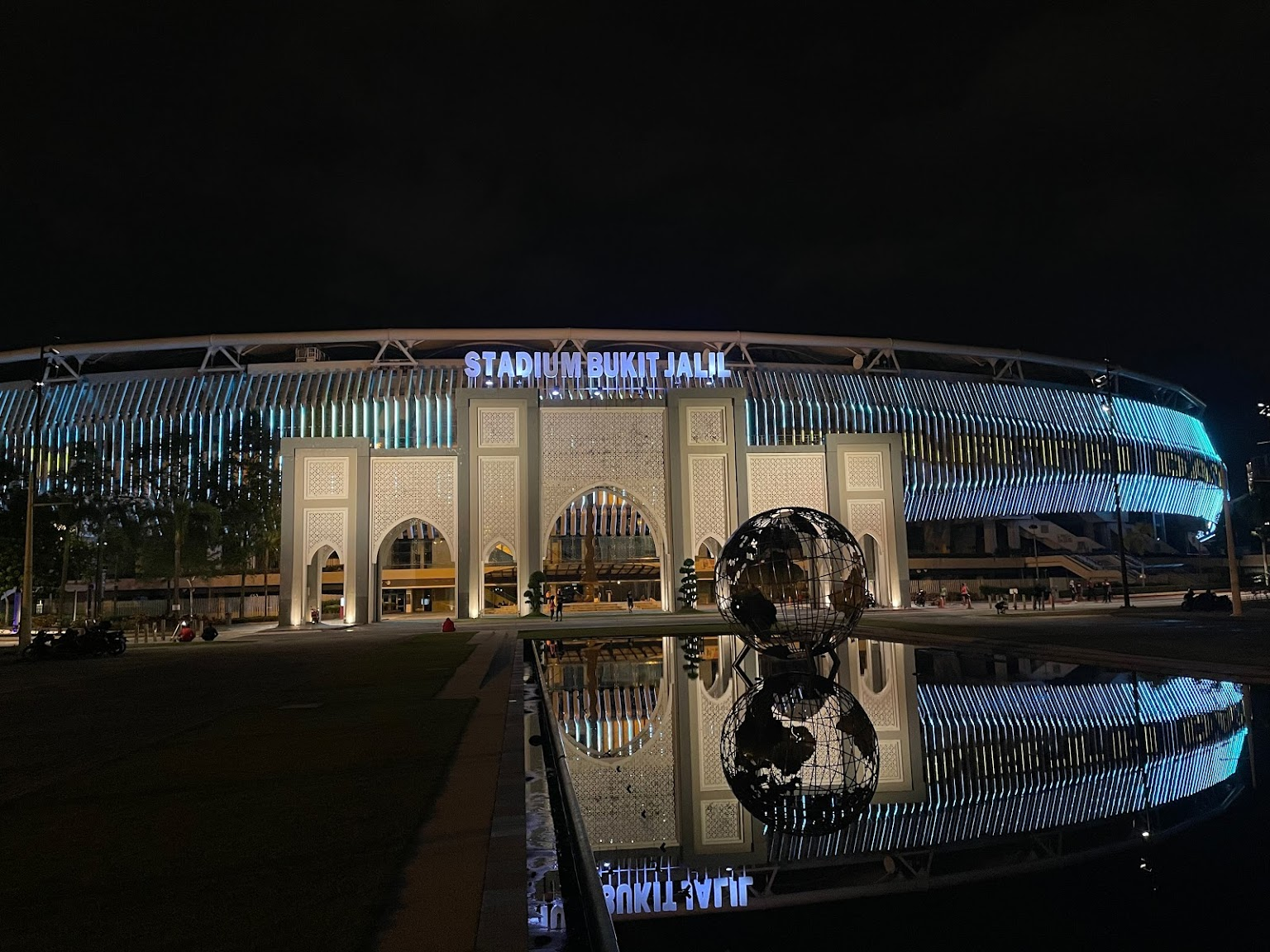
Bukit Jalil National Stadium

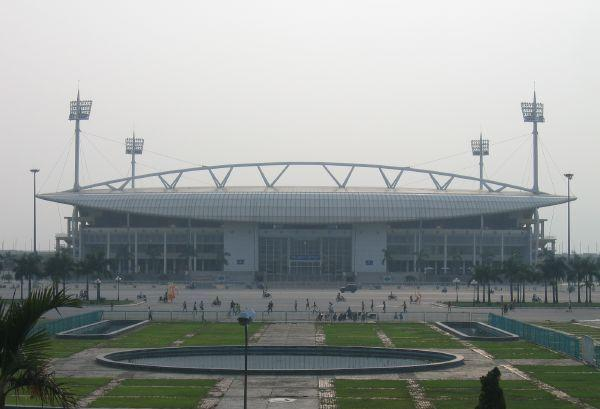
Mỹ Đình National Stadium

The two stadiums chosen to host the 2018 AFF Championship finals were the Bukit Jalil National Stadium in Kuala Lumpur, Malaysia and the Mỹ Đình National Stadium in Hanoi, Vietnam. The first leg was held at the Bukit Jalil Stadium, which opened on 1 January 1998 and was originally built for the 1998 Commonwealth Games. With a capacity of over 87,000, it is one of the largest stadiums in Southeast Asia and is the home ground of the Malaysian national football team. Since its inception, Bukit Jalil has hosted numerous international and regional sporting events, including the SEA Games, ASEAN Championship and FIFA World Cup qualification. The second leg match was held at My Dinh National Stadium, which was inaugurated in September 2003 to serve the 22nd Southeast Asian Games (SEA Games 22) held in Vietnam. With a capacity of about 40,000 spectators, the stadium serves as a key national sports venue and is the home ground of the Vietnam national football team. My Dinh has hosted many important international matches, multi-sport events as well as major cultural activities.

== Route to the final ==
Both Malaysia and Vietnam were drawn into Group A of the 2018 AFF Championship. After winning three and drawing one in group matches, Vietnam finished first in the group. Malaysia finished second in the group to progress to the knockout phase of the tournament. Vietnam's first match victory was against Laos with a score of 3–0. From there, they continue the path by beating Malaysia by 2–0 and drawing 0–0 with Myanmar before defeating Cambodia by 3–0. Vietnam progressed to the semi-finals to face Group B runner-up of the Philippines. In the first-leg in Bacolod, Vietnam won 2–1 before winning the second-leg in Hanoi by another similar scores of 2–1 with total aggregate of 4–2. Malaysia's won their first match against Cambodia by 1–0 before beating Laos by 3–1. Despite losing to Vietnam by 0–2, they managed to qualify to semi-finals after beating Myanmar by 3–0. In the semi-finals, Malaysia face Group B winner as well the defending champion of the tournament of Thailand. In the first-leg in Kuala Lumpur, they drew 0–0 before drawing 2–2 in the second-leg in Bangkok with a similar total aggregate of 2–2, qualifying through the away goals rule.

Note: In all results below, the score of the finalist is given first (H: home; A: away).

Malaysia				Round	Vietnam			
Opponent	Score			Group stage	Opponent	Score		
Cambodia	1–0			Match 1	Laos	3–0		
Laos	3–1			Match 2	Malaysia	2–0		
Vietnam	0–2			Match 3	Myanmar	0–0		
Myanmar	3–0			Match 4	Cambodia	3–0		
Group A runners-up: Pos / Team / Pld / Pts; 1 / Vietnam / 4 / 10; 2 / Malaysia / 4 / 9; 3 / Myanmar / 4 / 7; 4 / Cambodia / 4 / 3; 5 / Laos / 4 / 0; Source: AFF				Final standings	Group A winners: Pos / Team / Pld / Pts; 1 / Vietnam / 4 / 10; 2 / Malaysia / 4 / 9; 3 / Myanmar / 4 / 7; 4 / Cambodia / 4 / 3; 5 / Laos / 4 / 0; Source: AFF			
Opponent	Agg.	1st leg	2nd leg	Knockout phase	Opponent	Agg.	1st leg	2nd leg
Thailand	2–2 (a)	0–0 (H)	2–2 (A)	Semi-finals	Philippines	4–2	2–1 (A)	2–1 (H)

== Pre-match ==
=== Player situation ===
Before the first leg match against Vietnam, Malaysia is facing problems in terms of personnel when Safawi Rasid cannot complete the training program and is uncertain about his ability to play. Previously, Malaysia suffered a heavy loss when Syahmi Safari was suspended due to a red card in the semi-final match against Thailand, while three other players, Aidil Zafuan, Norshahrul Idlan Talaha and Syazwan Andik, are still uncertain about their ability to play due to injury. Meanwhile, Vietnam still ensures the best physical condition of the players.

=== Korean attention ===
Before the final, the Korean public expressed considerable interest in the Vietnamese team due to the influence of coach Park Hang-seo, who is leading the team and has been widely reported by the Korean media. Both matches attracted large audiences and were considered the most notable sporting events in each country in 2018.

== Matches ==
=== First leg ===
11 December 2018
20:45 UTC+8

Malaysia	2–2	Vietnam
Shahrul Saad 36'; Safawi Rasid 61'	Report (AFFSZ); Report (AFF)	Nguyễn Huy Hùng 22'; Phạm Đức Huy 25'

Bukit Jalil National Stadium, Kuala Lumpur
Attendance: 88,482
Referee: Chris Beath (Australia)

Malaysia	Vietnam

GK	1	Farizal Marlias
RB	2	Amirul Azhan		(substituted off) 60'
CB	17	Irfan Zakaria
CB	3	Shahrul Saad
LB	21	Nazirul Naim	(yellow card) 28'	(substituted off) 41'
RM	13	Mohamadou Sumareh
CM	14	Syamer Kutty Abba	(yellow card) 62'
CM	12	Akram Mahinan
LM	11	Safawi Rasid
SS	9	Norshahrul Idlan Talaha		(substituted off) 71'
CF	8	Zaquan Adha Radzak (c)	(yellow card) 38'
Substitutions:
DF	5	Adam Nor Azlin	(yellow card) 53'	(substituted on) 41'
FW	18	Syafiq Ahmad	(yellow card) 65'	(substituted on) 60'
MF	19	Akhyar Rashid		(substituted on) 71'
Manager:
Tan Cheng Hoe

GK	23	Đặng Văn Lâm
CB	3	Quế Ngọc Hải (c)
CB	21	Trần Đình Trọng	(yellow card) 90+2'
CB	28	Đỗ Duy Mạnh	(yellow card) 17'
RM	8	Nguyễn Trọng Hoàng
CM	15	Phạm Đức Huy		(substituted off) 76'
CM	29	Nguyễn Huy Hùng
LM	5	Đoàn Văn Hậu	(yellow card) 59'
RW	19	Nguyễn Quang Hải
LW	20	Phan Văn Đức		(substituted off) 86'
CF	13	Hà Đức Chinh		(substituted off) 53'
Substitutions:
FW	22	Nguyễn Tiến Linh		(substituted on) 53'
FW	14	Nguyễn Công Phượng		(substituted on) 76'
MF	16	Đỗ Hùng Dũng		(substituted on) 86'
Manager:
(South Korea) Park Hang-seo

Man of the Match:
Safawi Rasid (Malaysia)

Assistant referees:
Ronnie Koh Min Kiat (Singapore)
Bambang Syamsudar (Indonesia)
Fourth official:
Muhammad Taqi (Singapore)

Overall
Statistics	Malaysia	Vietnam
Goals scored	2	2
Total shots	8	15
Shots on target	4	4
Ball possession	58%	42%
Corner kicks	4	3
Fouls committed	20	15
Offsides	0	2
Yellow cards	5	3
Red cards	0	0

=== Second leg ===
15 December 2018
19:30 UTC+7

Vietnam	1–0	Malaysia
Nguyễn Anh Đức 6'	Report (AFFSZ); Report (AFF)

Mỹ Đình National Stadium, Hanoi
Attendance: 40,000
Referee: Alireza Faghani (Iran)

Vietnam	Malaysia

GK	23	Đặng Văn Lâm	(yellow card) 9'
CB	28	Đỗ Duy Mạnh	(yellow card) 53'
CB	21	Trần Đình Trọng	(yellow card) 19'
CB	3	Quế Ngọc Hải (c)
RWB	8	Nguyễn Trọng Hoàng	(yellow card) 16'
LWB	5	Đoàn Văn Hậu	(yellow card) 53'
CM	29	Nguyễn Huy Hùng	(yellow card) 29'
CM	16	Đỗ Hùng Dũng		(substituted off) 90+3'
RW	19	Nguyễn Quang Hải
LW	20	Phan Văn Đức		(substituted off) 71'
CF	11	Nguyễn Anh Đức		(substituted off) 81'
Substitutions:
DF	12	Nguyễn Phong Hồng Duy		(substituted on) 71'
FW	13	Hà Đức Chinh		(substituted on) 81'
MF	6	Lương Xuân Trường		(substituted on) 90+3'
Manager:
(South Korea) Park Hang-seo

GK	1	Farizal Marlias
RB	4	Syahmi Safari
CB	7	Aidil Zafuan Radzak	(yellow card) 9'	(substituted off) 76'
CB	3	Shahrul Saad	(yellow card) 36' (yellow-red card) 90+5'
LB	6	Syazwan Andik
RM	11	Safawi Rasid		(substituted off) 83'
CM	14	Syamer Kutty Abba	(yellow card) 40'
CM	12	Akram Mahinan		(substituted off) 85'
LM	13	Mohamadou Sumareh
SS	9	Norshahrul Idlan Talaha
CF	8	Zaquan Adha Radzak (c)	(yellow card) 80'
Substitutions:
FW	18	Syafiq Ahmad	(yellow card) 79'	(substituted on) 76'
MF	19	Akhyar Rashid		(substituted on) 83'
FW	10	Shahrel Fikri		(substituted on) 85'
Manager:
Tan Cheng Hoe

Man of the Match:
Nguyễn Quang Hải (Vietnam)

Assistant referees:
Reza Ebrahim Sokhandan (Iran)
Mohammad Reza Mansouri (Iran)
Fourth official:
Jansen Foo (Singapore)

Overall
Statistics	Vietnam	Malaysia
Goals scored	1	0
Total shots	10	13
Shots on target	3	5
Ball possession	42%	58%
Corner kicks	1	8
Fouls committed	12	19
Offsides	2	0
Yellow cards	6	5
Red cards	0	1

Vietnam win with aggregate 3–2.

== Post-match ==
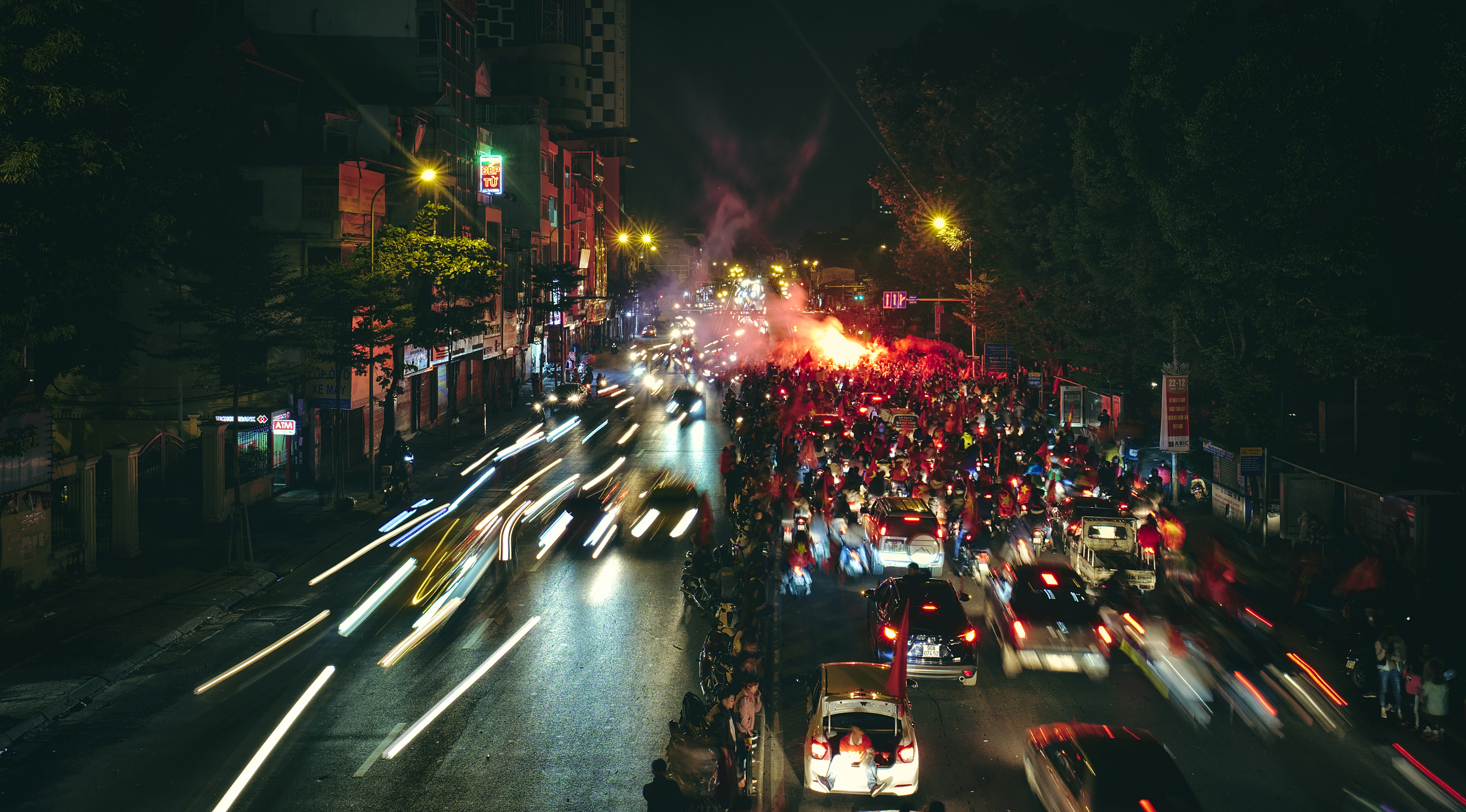
A "street storming" of people in Hanoi capital after the second leg match.

The 3–2 aggregate victory over Malaysia over two legs of the final helped the Vietnamese team win the 2018 AFF Suzuki Cup, marking the second time in history that the country's national football team has won the highest position in the regional tournament, after the first time in 2008. The Vietnamese public was very happy with the team's achievement, especially in the context that Vietnamese football had achieved many impressive achievements in 2018, in which the U-23 team of this country won the runner-up position at the 2018 AFC U-23 Championship held at the beginning of the year, and achieved fourth place overall in the men's football event of the 2018 Asian Games. In addition, before the tournament started, the team received many expectations from Vietnamese football fans after those achievements.

With an unbeaten record throughout the tournament, including 6 wins and 2 draws, scoring 15 goals and conceding only 4, Vietnam is considered the team with the most stable and effective performance in the tournament. Midfielder Nguyễn Quang Hải, one of the team's outstanding players, was honored with two individual titles: Best Player of the Final Second Leg and Best Player of the Tournament. Immediately after the second leg of the final, many "street storming" of victory celebrations broke out in major locations and cities in Vietnam such as Hanoi, Haiphong, Da Nang, Ho Chi Minh City, and many other localities. The central streets were crowded with people and red flags with yellow stars, creating a vibrant and exciting atmosphere across the country. The team's victory also attracted great attention from Vietnamese leaders. Immediately after the news of the team's victory was reported by Vietnamese state media, Prime Minister Nguyễn Xuân Phúc, Deputy Prime Ministers Vương Đình Huệ and Vũ Đức Đam, and Former President Trương Tấn Sang sent their congratulations to the entire team. During the meeting at the Government Office afterwards, the entire coaching staff and players received many compliments from state leaders and were awarded by many domestic agencies, businesses and social organizations. The Vietnamese team was also honored to receive the First Class Labor Medal from the Government for this achievement.

This match also attracted much attention in Korea, where coach Park Hang-seo worked for many years before coming to Vietnam. Coach Park Hang-seo's influence has prompted the country's SBS Television to buy the broadcasting rights for the 2018 AFF Suzuki Cup, but only broadcast matches involving the Vietnamese team. As the team won consecutively and advanced to the final, the viewership of Vietnam's matches on this channel suddenly increased sharply, forcing the station to change its broadcast schedule by temporarily suspending the TV series broadcast schedule to broadcast the final match live. The first leg recorded an average rating of 4.706%, peaking at 7% in the second half, while the second leg reached a record high of 16.31%, becoming the highest-rated program on this station since 2010. After Vietnam officially won the championship, South Korean President Moon Jae-in sent his congratulations to the team through a post on Facebook. Many artists and celebrities in Korea also sent their congratulations to the Vietnamese players. South Korean media have called Park's achievement a “miracle,” highlighting his influence on regional football. Some articles have likened the AFF Championship to the “World Cup of Southeast Asia,” while also calling Park “Rice Noodle Hiddink”, referring to coach Guus Hiddink, who led the Korean team to the semi-finals of the 2002 FIFA World Cup. Many newspapers also described the victory of the Vietnamese team as a "perfect victory" when the team did not lose any matches throughout the tournament.

For Malaysia, this defeat was considered by domestic media to be "hard to swallow", especially in the context that they had lost to Vietnam in the group stage. After the second leg match in Hanoi, many Malaysian players refused to be interviewed, while the few who spoke to the press could not hide their disappointment. Several Malaysian newspapers published headlines expressing their grief, including “Broken Hearts,” reflecting the regret of the country's fans. Another article devoted much of its content to praising the victory of the Vietnamese team, claiming that the “Golden Dragons” had surpassed the “Tigers” to win the tournament. However, some fans in this country were very angry and considered Nguyen Anh Duc's goal in the second leg match "invalid", claiming that this player was in an offside position.
