= 2018 AFF Championship final (second leg match) =

Association football match in Vietnam on December 15, 2018

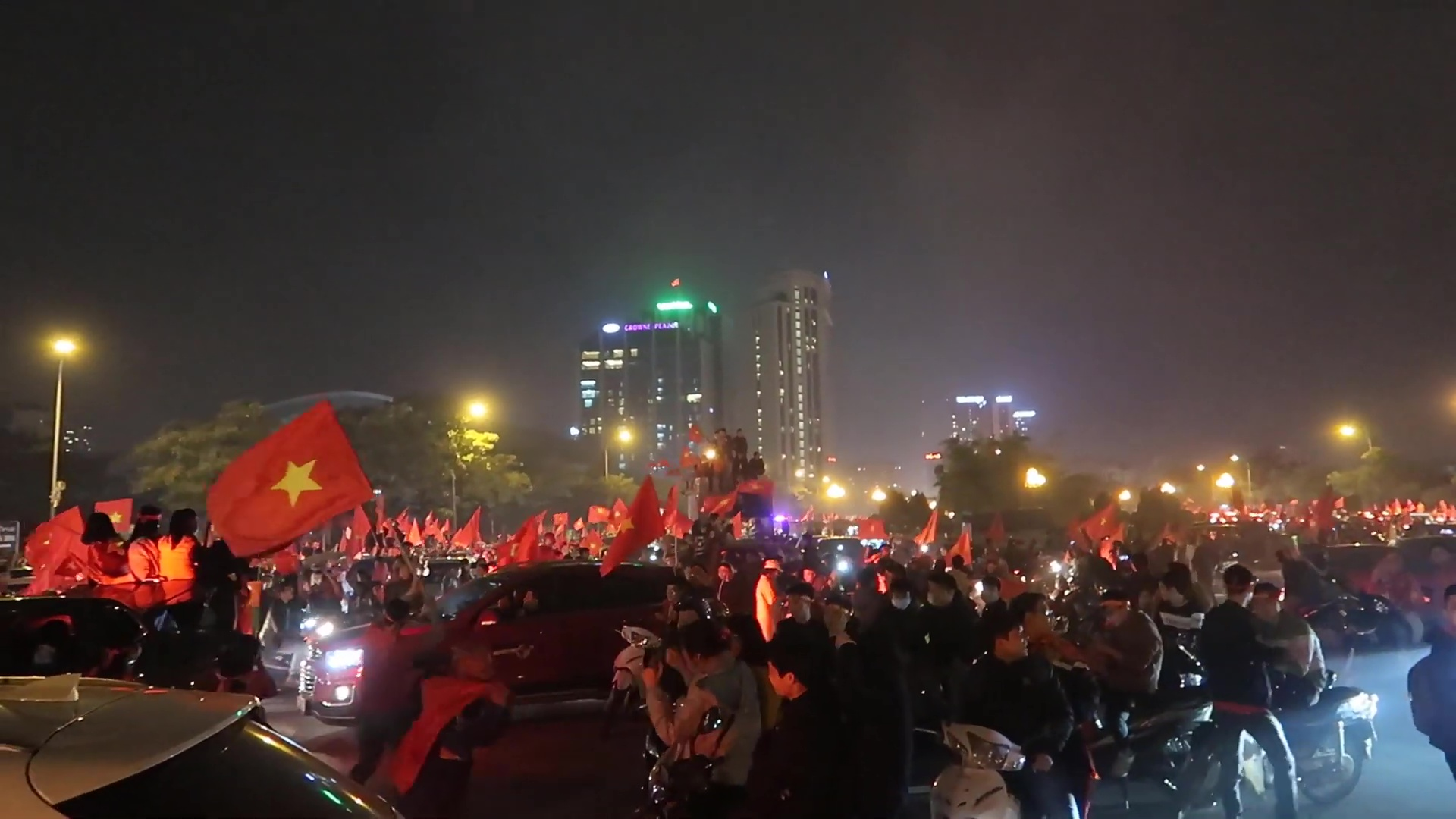
- Hanoi citizens celebrate the victory on the streets after the match.
Vietnam (VFF) (3–1–0)	Malaysia (FAM) (3–0–1)
1	0
Head coach: Park Hang-seo (KOR)	Head coach: Tan Cheng Hoe (MAS)
	1	2	Total
VIE	1	0	1
MAS	0	0	0
- Vietnam win with aggregate 3–2
- Date: December 15, 2018
- Kickoff time: 19:30 UTC+7
- Stadium: Mỹ Đình National Stadium; Từ Liêm, Hanoi
- POTM pres. by Honor: Nguyễn Quang Hải, Winger
- Favourite: Vietnam by 0.75
- Referee: Alireza Faghani (Iran)
- Attendance: 40,000

TV broadcasters
- Network: Vietnam; VTV6; South Korea; SBS; SBS Sports
- Announcers: VTV6; Tạ Biên Cương; Nguyễn Khắc Cường; SBS; Bae Sung-jae; Jang Ji-hyun
- Nielsen ratings: 31% (Vietnam); 21,9% (South Korea)

On December 15, 2018, the Vietnam national football team had a match against Malaysia in the second leg of the 2018 AFF Championship final determine the champion of the AFF Championship that year, the match was held at Mỹ Đình National Stadium in Hanoi, the capital of Vietnam. On their way to the final, Vietnam topped Group A with three wins and one draw, while Malaysia finished behind them with three wins and one loss (against their opponent). Vietnam then defeated the Philippines with aggregate score 4–2 in the semi-finals, while Malaysia overcame Thailand on the away goals rule after a 2–2 aggregate score over two legs. The match was played in front of 40,000 spectators, and the referee was Alireza Faghani, an Iranian-Australian. The Vietnamese public showed the most interest in the match, due to the achievements of their national football team before the tournament, and also because the Vietnamese squad included many players who had finished as runners-up in the 2018 AFC U-23 Championship. Furthermore, the South Korean public also paid close attention because coach Park Hang-seo was leading the Vietnamese national team at the time.

Vietnam opened the scoring in the 6th minute through Nguyễn Anh Đức, assisted by Nguyễn Quang Hải and Đoàn Văn Hậu. Following the lead, Vietnam adopted a defensive counter-attacking strategy, dropping deep into their own half. Malaysia were forced to push forward in search of an equalizer but faced fierce resistance from the Vietnamese defense and the brilliance of goalkeeper Đặng Văn Lâm, particularly his spectacular save against Mohamadou Sumareh's backheel in the 11th minute. Throughout the second half, Malaysia controlled possession but were unable to penetrate the home team's disciplined defense. Malaysia's set pieces were frequently neutralized by the height and positioning of the Vietnamese defenders. In the final minutes, the atmosphere became extremely tense with numerous fierce clashes. Due to the strictness of referee Alireza Faghani, the match saw a record number of cards, with a total of 11 yellow cards issued to both teams, including 6 yellow cards for Vietnam and 5 for Malaysia. This included an indirect red card (2 yellow cards) for Malaysian centre-back Shahrul Saad after fouling a Vietnamese player to stop a counter-attack, leaving Malaysia to finish the match with 10 players and Vietnam won with the score 1–0 and aggregate score of 3–2 after two legs.

Vietnam's victory marks their second ASEAN Championship title, after their first title in 2008 tournament over the Thailand with the same aggregate score. (Note: Vietnam won against Thailand 2–1 in the first leg on December 24, 2008, before drawing 1–1 in the second leg on December 28, 2008, to win the 2008 AFF Championship final with a aggregate score of 3–2.) Vietnamese attacking midfielder Nguyễn Quang Hải won two awards: Man of the Match and Most Valuable Player of the tournament, celebrations of victory swept across major cities in Vietnam after the match ended. The match also attracted considerable attention from South Korean viewers for the Vietnamese team, even though it wasn't a match involving their national team and was a regional tournament in Southeast Asia. According to reports, this final match set viewership ratings records in the region: In Vietnam, the average rating reached an unprecedented high of 28.14% in Hanoi and peaked at over 31%; in South Korea, due to the attention given to coach Park Hang-seo, SBS recorded an average rating of 18.1% and a peak of 25.3%, becoming the most-watched sports program in the country for a decade at that time. Many newspapers in Vietnam and South Korea reported on the match after Vietnam won the championship, against the backdrop of Vietnamese football achieving many impressive results in 2018. Newspapers in South Korea are calling this the "Park Hang-seo Miracle" (Korean: 박항서의 기적, romanized: bakangseoui gijeok) because of what this coach has shown with the Vietnamese national team.

Due to the impact of the match on Vietnamese football, public opinion in this country usually only mentions the second leg whenever the final match of the tournament is discussed, and it also contributes to promoting diplomatic relations between Vietnam and South Korea.

== Background ==
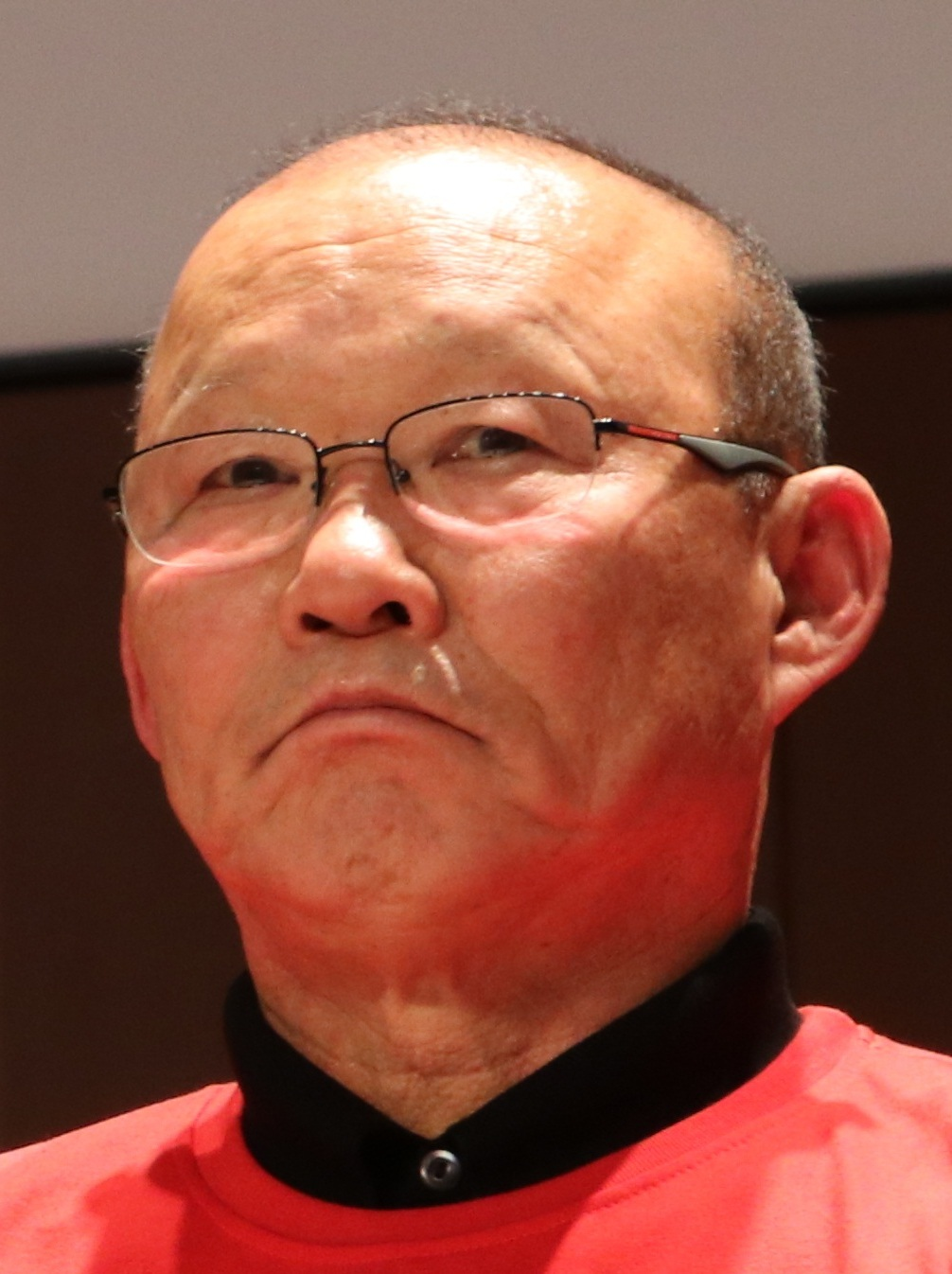
Park Hang-seo has the opportunity to win his first championship title with Vietnamese football.

From its inaugural tournament in 1996, known as the Tiger Cup, until the 2018 edition, both the Vietnamese and Malaysian national teams were regular participants and considered strong teams in the region. The Vietnamese team participated in every edition of the tournament and won their first title in 2008 under coach Henrique Calisto, after defeating Thailand in the final. Besides this title, Vietnam finished as runners-up in 1998 and consistently reached the semi-finals in 1996, 2000, 2002, 2007, 2010, 2014, and 2016. The period from 2014 to 2016 saw consistent performance, with the team reaching the semi-finals but failing to advance to the final match. As for the Malaysian team, they also boast a similar track record, winning the championship in 2010 after defeating Indonesia in the final. Prior to that, Malaysia reached the first final of the tournament in 1996 but lost to Thailand. In subsequent stages, they finished as runners-up once more in 2014 and reached the semi-finals several times in 2000, 2002, 2004, and 2012. A common characteristic of Malaysia during this period was their ability to maintain fluctuating performance but often perform effectively in knockout matches.

Prior to the 2018, the history of confrontations between Vietnam and Malaysia in the AFF Championship showed a relatively balanced record, but Vietnam had a slight advantage in terms of wins. In 10 official encounters in this tournament since 1996, Vietnam won 5 matches, drew 2, and lost 3. Vietnam's biggest victory against their opponent was in the 2002 tournament with a 2–1 score in the third-place match. However, Malaysia has held the upper hand in several crucial knockout matches. Most notably, in the 2010 semi-final, Malaysia eliminated defending champions Vietnam with a 2–0 aggregate score over two legs. In 2014, the two teams met again in the semi-final; although Vietnam won 2–1 in the first leg away from home, Malaysia won 4–2 in the second leg at My Dinh Stadium, overturning the deficit to a 5–4 aggregate score. These results have forged a long and storied rivalry between the two leading football nations in the region ahead of the 2018 final.

The Vietnamese national team's preparation for the 2018 AFF Championship was closely linked to a generational transition under South Korean coach Park Hang-seo. Following success at the 2018 AFC U-23 Championship and the 2018 Asian Games, the core of the team is a combination of young players in their prime and experienced veterans. The team underwent a two-week training camp at the Paju Sports Center in South Korea in October 2018. There, Vietnam played three friendly matches against local clubs to test tactical formations such as 3–4–3 and 3–5–2. Vietnam's squad is considered to have depth, with outstanding individuals in various positions such as Đặng Văn Lâm, Quế Ngọc Hải, Nguyễn Quang Hải, and Nguyễn Anh Đức. On the Malaysian side, the Football Association of Malaysia (FAM) appointed Tan Cheng Hoe as head coach with the goal of rebuilding their playing style. Malaysia shifted from a physically demanding style of play to a control-oriented, short-passing style that builds attacks from their own half. To prepare for the tournament, Malaysia conducted a squad review through international friendly matches against opponents such as Sri Lanka and Kyrgyzstan. Notably, this is the first AFF Cup where Malaysia has used a naturalized player, with the case of winger Mohamadou Sumareh. The Malaysian team focused on building cohesion between veteran players and new talents from the national U-23 team, aiming to improve on their early elimination in the group stage of the tournament two years prior.

== Pre-match ==
=== First-leg match ===
The first leg, played on December 11, 2018, at the Bukit Jalil National Stadium, ended in a 2–2 draw. Vietnam took an early two-goal lead through Nguyen Huy Hung and Pham Duc Huy, but Malaysia equalized with two goals from set pieces. The away-goal draw gave Vietnam a significant advantage going into the return match. According to the tournament regulations, Vietnam only needed a 0–0 or 1–1 draw in the second leg to win the championship. Conversely, Malaysia had to win or draw by a score of 3–3 or higher to secure the title in regular time.

11 December 2018
20:45 UTC+8

Malaysia	2–2	Vietnam
Shahrul Saad 36'; Safawi Rasid 61'	Report (AFF)	Nguyễn Huy Hùng 22'; Phạm Đức Huy 25'

Bukit Jalil National Stadium, Kuala Lumpur
Attendance: 88,482
Referee: Chris Beath (Australia)

Team details

Malaysia	Vietnam

GK	1	Farizal Marlias
RB	2	Amirul Azhan		(substituted off) 60'
CB	17	Irfan Zakaria
CB	3	Shahrul Saad
LB	21	Nazirul Naim	(yellow card) 28'	(substituted off) 41'
RM	13	Mohamadou Sumareh
CM	14	Syamer Kutty Abba	(yellow card) 62'
CM	12	Akram Mahinan
LM	11	Safawi Rasid
SS	9	Norshahrul Idlan Talaha		(substituted off) 71'
CF	8	Zaquan Adha Radzak (c)	(yellow card) 38'
Substitutions:
DF	5	Adam Nor Azlin	(yellow card) 53'	(substituted on) 41'
FW	18	Syafiq Ahmad	(yellow card) 65'	(substituted on) 60'
MF	19	Akhyar Rashid		(substituted on) 71'
Manager:
Tan Cheng Hoe

GK	23	Đặng Văn Lâm
CB	3	Quế Ngọc Hải (c)
CB	21	Trần Đình Trọng	(yellow card) 90+2'
CB	28	Đỗ Duy Mạnh	(yellow card) 17'
RM	8	Nguyễn Trọng Hoàng
CM	15	Phạm Đức Huy		(substituted off) 76'
CM	29	Nguyễn Huy Hùng
LM	5	Đoàn Văn Hậu	(yellow card) 59'
RW	19	Nguyễn Quang Hải
LW	20	Phan Văn Đức		(substituted off) 86'
CF	13	Hà Đức Chinh		(substituted off) 53'
Substitutions:
FW	22	Nguyễn Tiến Linh		(substituted on) 53'
FW	14	Nguyễn Công Phượng		(substituted on) 76'
MF	16	Đỗ Hùng Dũng		(substituted on) 86'
Manager:
(South Korea) Park Hang-seo

Man of the Match:
Safawi Rasid (Malaysia)

Assistant referees:
Ronnie Koh Min Kiat (Singapore)
Bambang Syamsudar (Indonesia)
Fourth official:
Muhammad Taqi (Singapore)

=== Broadcasting ===
On December 13, 2018, Seoul Broadcasting System (SBS) announced a temporary suspension of the next episodes of the prime-time drama Fates and Furies to dedicate the entire broadcast time to the match. Previously, matches of the Vietnamese national team under the leadership of South Korean coach Park Hang-seo were mainly broadcast on the cable television channel SBS Sports. However, due to increased viewer demand, the station has switched to a nationwide broadcast channel. According to media reports, the first leg match on December 11 recorded an average viewership rating of 4.706%, peaking at 7% in the second half.

=== Other activities ===
Starting on the afternoon of December 15, thousands of fans gathered in the square in front of Mỹ Đình National Stadium. Organized fan clubs rehearsed cheering rituals, using drums and handheld loudspeakers to coordinate the crowd. Maximum security forces were deployed to manage traffic flow and control the crowd as the vehicles carrying the two teams moved into the stadium area. In the stands, groups of fans began deploying large flags and preparing visual cheering strategies to implement as soon as the match began. In other major cities, public football viewing areas (Fanzones) also attracted large crowds before kick-off. In Hồ Chí Minh City, the Nguyễn Huệ Boulevard area was equipped with many large LED screens, attracting tens of thousands of people gathering from around 4 PM. In other localities such as Đà Nẵng, Hải Phòng, and Cần Thơ, many large screens were also installed in squares, cultural centers, and local stadiums to serve the needs of people who could not travel to Hanoi to watch the matches live.

== Match ==
=== Summary ===
==== First half ====
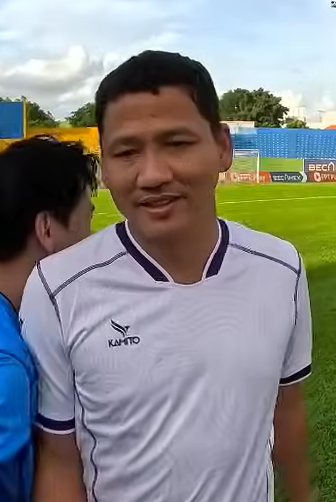
Nguyễn Anh Đức, the player who scored the only goal in the match, helped Vietnam win.

Malaysia kicked off the match at 19:30 local time (12:30 UTC) in front of a crowd of 40,000. Immediately after referee Alireza Faghani blew the opening whistle, the home team Vietnam proactively deployed an attacking style of play to seek an early advantage. In the 6th minute, the turning point of the match occurred. Midfielder Nguyễn Quang Hải skillfully controlled the ball on the left flank before delivering a medium-range cross into the penalty area. Striker Nguyễn Anh Đức, unmarked, took a shot with his left foot. Although Malaysian goalkeeper Farizal Marlias managed to get a hand to the ball, the powerful shot went straight into the net, giving Vietnam a 1–0 lead. The aggregate score was then raised to 3–2 in favor of Vietnam.

After conceding a goal, Malaysia pushed forward in search of an equalizer. In the 11th minute, Mohamadou Sumareh's backheel shot went just wide of the post, beating goalkeeper Đặng Văn Lâm. The match became increasingly tense with fierce challenges in the midfield. The referee had to constantly use yellow cards to control the heated tempers. Goalkeeper Đặng Văn Lâm received a yellow card in the 9th minute for protesting. Then, in the 16th minute, Nguyễn Trọng Hoàng also received a similar yellow card. Trần Đình Trọng was the next player from the home team to receive a yellow card in the 19th minute. On the Malaysian side, two players received yellow cards in this half: Aidil Zafuan in the 9th minute and Shahrul Saad in the 36th minute. Another notable incident was the yellow card given to Nguyễn Huy Hùng of Vietnam in the 29th minute. In the 44th minute, Malaysia had the most dangerous chance of the first half when Syahmi Safari unleashed a long-range shot, forcing Dang Van Lam to make a full-stretch save.

==== Second half ====
Entering the second half, the Malaysian team was forced to push forward in search of at least one goal to equalize the aggregate score. In the 50th minute, from a corner kick on the right wing, a Malaysian player executed a dangerous close-range header, forcing goalkeeper Dang Van Lam to make a diving save right on the goal line. This was considered the most dangerous scoring opportunity for the visiting team in this half. Immediately afterwards, the match became chaotic with fierce challenges. In the 53rd minute, referee Alireza Faghani had to issue two consecutive yellow cards to Đỗ Duy Mạnh and Đoàn Văn Hậu of Vietnam to control the heated tempers. Although Malaysia controlled the ball more, their shots were frequently blocked by the disciplined defense of the home team.

On the opposite side, Vietnam launched sharp counter-attacks. Quang Hải and Văn Đức combined in close to the penalty area, but their final shots lacked the necessary power to beat goalkeeper Farizal Marlias. In the 71st minute, coach Park Hang-seo made a tactical substitution, bringing on Nguyễn Phong Hồng Duy to replace Văn Đức in order to strengthen the attack from the flanks. In the final minutes of the match, Malaysia attempted long-range shots, but the ball often missed the target or was easily saved by Văn Lâm. In the 79th and 80th minutes, psychological pressure led to Syafiq Ahmad and Zaquan Adha of Malaysia receiving yellow cards for overly aggressive tackles. In the 81st minute, the opening goal scorer Nguyễn Anh Đức left the field, making way for Hà Đức Chinh to maintain pressure in the attacking line.

The match ended after center-back Shahrul Saad received his second yellow card in the 90+5th minute and was sent off. With a narrow 1–0 victory, Vietnam officially won the match with an aggregate score of 3–2 and claimed the championship.

=== Details ===
15 December 2018
19:30 UTC+7

Vietnam	1–0	Malaysia
Nguyễn Anh Đức 6'	Report

Mỹ Đình National Stadium, Hanoi
Attendance: 40,000
Referee: Alireza Faghani (Iran)

Vietnam	Malaysia

GK	23	Đặng Văn Lâm	(yellow card) 9'
CB	28	Đỗ Duy Mạnh	(yellow card) 53'
CB	21	Trần Đình Trọng	(yellow card) 19'
CB	3	Quế Ngọc Hải (c)
RWB	8	Nguyễn Trọng Hoàng	(yellow card) 16'
LWB	5	Đoàn Văn Hậu	(yellow card) 53'
CM	29	Nguyễn Huy Hùng	(yellow card) 29'
CM	16	Đỗ Hùng Dũng		(substituted off) 90+3'
RW	19	Nguyễn Quang Hải
LW	20	Phan Văn Đức		(substituted off) 71'
CF	11	Nguyễn Anh Đức		(substituted off) 81'
Substitutions:
DF	12	Nguyễn Phong Hồng Duy		(substituted on) 71'
FW	13	Hà Đức Chinh		(substituted on) 81'
MF	6	Lương Xuân Trường		(substituted on) 90+3'
Manager:
(South Korea) Park Hang-seo

GK	1	Farizal Marlias
RB	4	Syahmi Safari
CB	7	Aidil Zafuan Radzak	(yellow card) 9'	(substituted off) 76'
CB	3	Shahrul Saad	(yellow card) 36' (yellow-red card) 90+5'
LB	6	Syazwan Andik
RM	11	Safawi Rasid		(substituted off) 83'
CM	14	Syamer Kutty Abba	(yellow card) 40'
CM	12	Akram Mahinan		(substituted off) 85'
LM	13	Mohamadou Sumareh
SS	9	Norshahrul Idlan Talaha
CF	8	Zaquan Adha Radzak (c)	(yellow card) 80'
Substitutions:
FW	18	Syafiq Ahmad	(yellow card) 79'	(substituted on) 76'
MF	19	Akhyar Rashid		(substituted on) 83'
FW	10	Shahrel Fikri		(substituted on) 85'
Manager:
Tan Cheng Hoe

Man of the Match:
Nguyễn Quang Hải (Vietnam)

Assistant referees:
Reza Ebrahim Sokhandan (Iran)
Mohammad Reza Mansouri (Iran)
Fourth official:
Foo Chuan Hui (Singapore)
Match commissioner:
Pairit Tanpairee (Thailand)
Referee assessor:
Preecha Kangram (Thailand)

Match rules

- 90 minutes
- Maximum of twelve named substitutes
- Maximum of three substitutions

Scoring summary
Half	Team	Scorer	Assist(s)	Minute	Score
1st	VIE	Nguyễn Anh Đức (11)	Đoàn Văn Hậu (5), Nguyễn Quang Hải (19)	6	1–0 VIE
2nd	None				
Card summary
Half	Team	Player	Reason	Minute	Color
1st	VIE	Đặng Văn Lâm (23)	Collision with an opposing player	9	Yellow
1st	MAS	Aidil Zafuan (7)	Unlawful tackle on an opposing player	9	Yellow
1st	VIE	Nguyễn Trọng Hoàng (8)	Dissent	16	Yellow
1st	VIE	Trần Đình Trọng (21)	Dissent	19	Yellow
1st	VIE	Nguyễn Huy Hùng (29)	High leg foul	29	Yellow
1st	MAS	Shahrul Saad (3)	Pulling an opposing player's shirt	36	Yellow
1st	MAS	Syamer Kutty Abba (14)	Pushing an opposing player	40	Yellow
2nd	VIE	Đoàn Văn Hậu (5)	Bad foul	53	Yellow
2nd	VIE	Đỗ Duy Mạnh (28)	Dissent	53	Yellow
2nd	MAS	Zaquan Adha (8)	Collision with an opposing player	80	Yellow
2nd	MAS	Shahrul Saad (3)	Fouling to stop a counter-attack	90+5	Red (2Y)

Vietnam win with aggregate 3–2.

=== Statistics ===
First half
Statistic	Vietnam	Malaysia
Goals scored	1	0
Total shots	5	4
Shots on target	2	1
Saves	1	1
Ball possession	42%	58%
Corner kicks	0	1
Fouls	8	10
Offsides	1	0
Yellow cards	4	3
Red cards	0	0

Second half
Statistic	Vietnam	Malaysia
Goals scored	0	0
Total shots	8	6
Shots on target	1	4
Saves	4	1
Ball possession	42%	58%
Corner kicks	1	7
Fouls	4	9
Offsides	1	0
Yellow cards	2	2
Red cards	0	1

Overall
Statistic	Vietnam	Malaysia
Goals scored	1	0
Total shots	13	10
Shots on target	3	5
Saves	5	2
Ball possession	42%	58%
Corner kicks	1	8
Fouls	12	19
Offsides	2	0
Yellow cards	6	5
Red cards	0	1

== Post-match ==
Final position of the 2018 AFF Championship
Winner	Runner-up	Semi-finalist (Note: There was no match for third place in this tournament, the two teams eliminated in the semi-finals shared third place.)	
Vietnam; Manager: Park Hang-seo (KOR) (2nd title)	Malaysia; Manager: Tan Cheng Hoe (3rd title)	Philippines; Manager: Sven-Göran Eriksson (SWE)	Thailand; Manager: Milovan Rajevac (SER)

Most Valuable Player and winning captain of the 2018 AFF Championship

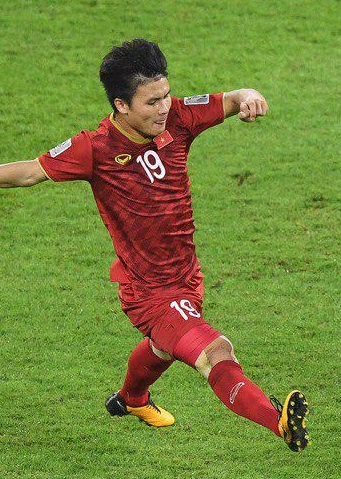
Nguyễn Quang Hải, Most Valuable Player of the tournament.

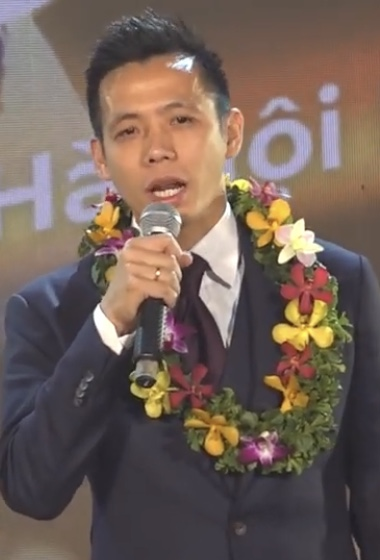
Nguyễn Văn Quyết, winning captain of the tournament.

Vietnam won the AFF Championship for the second time, surpassing Malaysia to become the third most-time champions in the tournament, behind only Singapore with 4 titles and Thailand with 5. (Note: The number of tournament championships won by each team in 2018, after Vietnam won its second championship.) This also marks their second championship title in the team's history, since their first in 2008, under a Portuguese coach, Henrique Calisto. Vietnam's attacking midfielder Nguyễn Quang Hải won two awards: Man of the Match and Tournament MVP, with the title, he received a US$10,000 prize from the tournament's organisation board. He subsequently won the 2018 Vietnamese Golden Ball on December 22, 2018, just one week after the match. With this champion, captain Nguyễn Văn Quyết became the winning captain of the season.

In Vietnam, this event generated a massive wave of celebrations nationwide. Immediately after the second leg of the final, many "street storming" of victory celebrations broke out in major locations and cities in Vietnam such as Hanoi, Haiphong, Da Nang, Ho Chi Minh City, and many other localities. The central streets were crowded with people and red flags with yellow stars, creating a vibrant and exciting atmosphere across the country. The team's victory also attracted great attention from Vietnamese leaders. Immediately after the news of the team's victory was reported by Vietnamese state media, Prime Minister Nguyễn Xuân Phúc, Deputy Prime Ministers Vương Đình Huệ and Vũ Đức Đam, and Former President Trương Tấn Sang sent their congratulations to the entire team. During the meeting at the Government Office afterwards, the entire coaching staff and players received many compliments from state leaders and were awarded by many domestic agencies, businesses and social organizations. The Vietnamese team was also honored to receive the First Class Labor Medal from the Government for this achievement. But for Malaysia, this defeat was considered by domestic media to be "hard to swallow", especially in the context that they had lost to Vietnam in the group stage. After the second leg match in Hanoi, many Malaysian players refused to be interviewed, while the few who spoke to the press could not hide their disappointment. Several Malaysian newspapers published headlines expressing their grief, including “Broken Hearts,” reflecting the regret of the country's fans. Another article devoted much of its content to praising the victory of the Vietnamese team, claiming that the “Golden Dragons” had surpassed the “Tigers” to win the tournament. However, some fans in this country were very angry and considered Nguyen Anh Duc's goal in the second leg match "invalid", claiming that this player was in an offside position.

"I would like to warmly congratulate the Vietnam National Football Team, under the leadership of Coach Park Hang Seo, on winning the 2018 Southeast Asian Football Championship. Witnessing the Vietnamese fans waving both Vietnamese and Korean flags at yesterday's final match, I felt that the two countries have become increasingly close friends through football. I am even happier that this glorious achievement was accomplished by Coach Park Hang Seo and the Vietnamese players, whom I met in person at the training ground during my state visit to Vietnam last March. I hope to continue seeing such wonderful moments from them in the future. I hope that Vietnam and Korea will continue to cultivate their special friendship and together build a bright and prosperous future."

— South Korean President Moon Jae-in sent his congratulations to Vietnam after the match.

Notably, the match attracted particular attention from South Korea, where coach Park Hang-seo worked for many years before coming to Vietnam. Coach Park Hang-seo's influence has prompted the country's SBS Television to buy the broadcasting rights for the 2018 AFF Suzuki Cup, but only broadcast matches involving the Vietnamese team. As the team won consecutively and advanced to the final, the viewership of Vietnam's matches on this channel suddenly increased sharply, forcing the station to change its broadcast schedule by temporarily suspending the TV series broadcast schedule to broadcast the final match live. The first leg recorded an average rating of 4.706%, peaking at 7% in the second half, while the second leg reached a record high of 16.31%, becoming the highest-rated program on this station since 2010. After Vietnam officially won the championship, South Korean President Moon Jae-in sent his congratulations to the team through a post on Facebook. Many artists and celebrities in Korea also sent their congratulations to the Vietnamese players. South Korean media have called calling this the "Park Hang-seo Miracle" (Korean: 박항서의 기적, romanized: bakangseoui gijeok), highlighting his influence on regional football. Some articles have likened the AFF Championship to the “World Cup of Southeast Asia,” while also calling Park “Rice Noodle Hiddink”, referring to coach Guus Hiddink, who led the South Korean team to the semi-finals of the 2002 FIFA World Cup. Many newspapers also described the victory of the Vietnamese team as a "perfect victory" when the team did not lose any matches throughout the tournament.

Coach Park Hang-seo's success at this tournament has become a symbol of cultural exchange, contributing to strengthening diplomatic relations and friendly cooperation between Vietnam and South Korea in many fields beyond sports. Coach Park Hang-seo's influence extends beyond football to include economics and tourism. Vietnamese people have a greater fondness for Korean culture, and conversely, the wave of investment and interest from Korean tourists in Vietnam has grown strongly in late 2018 and early 2019. This further strengthened diplomatic relations between the two countries before upgrading their relationship to a "Comprehensive Strategic Partnership" in 2022. In Vietnamese media coverage, the second leg is often mentioned more frequently than the first leg, mainly because it's the decisive moment for the title and takes place at home.

== See also ==
=== Newspaper ===
- Sơn, Đức (2 December 2018). "Ký ức AFF Cup: Trận bán kết lịch sử trước người Thái và chu kỳ 10 năm" [AFF Championship Memories: The historic semi-final match against Thailand and the 10-year cycle]. Dân Việt (in Vietnamese).
- "Ngày này năm xưa: ĐT Việt Nam khởi đầu hành trình vô địch AFF Cup" [This day in history: The Vietnam national team begins its journey to win the AFF Championship]. Voice of Vietnam (in Vietnamese). 8 November 2022.
- An, Khánh (4 December 2021). "Ký ức AFF Cup 2018: Sức mạnh tuyệt đối của tuyển Việt Nam" [Memories of the 2018 AFF Championship: The absolute dominance of the Vietnamese national team]. Lao Động (in Vietnamese).
- Tiến, Trần (15 December 2020). "Ngày này năm xưa: ĐT Việt Nam vô địch AFF Cup sau trận thắng thuyết phục" [This day in history: The Vietnam national team won the AFF Championship after a convincing victory]. Voice of Vietnam (in Vietnamese).
- Nguyên, Tây (4 December 2021). "AFF Cup 2020: Trung vệ Malaysia chưa quên ký ức cay đắng với tuyển Việt Nam" [2020 AFF Championship: Malaysian center-back still remembers bitter memories with the Vietnamese national team]. Thanh Niên (in Vietnamese).

=== Others ===
- 2008 AFF Championship final
- 2018 AFF Championship
- Park Hang-seo
- South Korea–Vietnam relations
- Vietnam at the ASEAN Championship
