= Air bomb =

Air bomb may refer to:

- Airbomb, a type of firework
- Aerial bomb, an explosive weapon dropped through the air

== See also ==
- Airstrike, an offensive operation carried out by aircraft
- Bat bomb, an experimental World War II weapon
- Hail Mary pass, a very long forward pass in American football
- Microburst, an intense small-scale downdraft produced by a thunderstorm or rain shower
- Thermobaric weapon, a type of explosive that uses oxygen from the surrounding air to generate a high-temperature explosion
