= 2018 AFF Championship =

Tournament details
- Dates: November 8 – December 15
- Teams: 10 (from 1 sub-confederation)
- Venues: 12 (in 10 host cities)

Final positions
- Champions: Vietnam (2nd title)
- Runners-up: Malaysia

Tournament statistics
- Matches played: 26
- Goals scored: 80 (3.08 per match)
- Attendance: 757,570 (29,137 per match)
- Top scorer(s): (Thailand) Adisak Kraisorn (8 goals)
- Best player: Vietnam Nguyễn Quang Hải
- Fair play award: Malaysia

The 2018 AFF Championship was the 12th edition of the AFF Championship, the football championship of nations affiliated to the ASEAN Football Federation (AFF), and the 6th under the name AFF Suzuki Cup. This was the first time a new format has been applied with the group stage was played in a home-and-away format instead of be hosted in two nations from 2002 to 2016.

The final tournament ran from 8 November and ended on 15 December 2018. Through the agreement between AFF and East Asian Football Federation (EAFF), the winner of the tournament will qualify for the AFF–EAFF Champions Trophy.

Thailand were the two-time defending champions, but lost to Malaysia in the semi-finals. Vietnam won the tournament by a 3–2 victory in the two-legged final against Malaysia to secure their second title, and subsequently qualified to meet 2017 EAFF E-1 Football Championship winner of South Korea in the 2019 AFF–EAFF Champions Trophy.

== Format ==
In March 2016, it was reported that the AFF was mulling over changes to the tournament format due to the failure to attract big crowds for matches not involving the host nation. It was then confirmed by the AFF that starting with the 2018 edition, a new format would be applied. The nine highest ranked teams would automatically qualify with the 10th and 11th ranked teams playing in a two-legged qualifier. The 10 teams would be split in two groups of five and play a round robin system with each team playing two home and two away fixtures. A draw will be made to determine where the teams play while the format of the knockout round would remain unchanged.

Home-Away matches division:

Pots	1	2	3	4	5
1	~	H	A	H	A
2	A	~	H	A	H
3	H	A	~	H	A
4	A	H	A	~	H
5	H	A	H	A	~

== Qualification ==
Qualified for AFF Championship Failed to qualify Did not enter Not an AFF member

Nine teams were automatically qualified in the AFF Championship final tournament. Based on the 2016 AFF Championship ranking, Brunei and Timor Leste played in a home and away playoffs which was conducted on 1 and 8 September 2018 with the latter securing qualification. Australia, a member since 2013, did not enter the tournament.

=== Qualified teams ===
Team	Appearance	Previous best performance
Cambodia	7th	Group stage (1996, 2000, 2002, 2004, 2008, 2016)
Indonesia	12th	Runners-up (2000, 2002, 2004, 2010, 2016)
Laos	11th	Group stage (1996, 1998, 2000, 2002, 2004, 2007, 2008, 2010, 2012, 2014)
Malaysia	12th	Winners (2010)
Myanmar	12th	Fourth place (2004), Semi-finalists (2016)
Philippines	11th	Semi-finalists (2010, 2012, 2014)
Singapore	12th	Winners (1998, 2004, 2007, 2012)
Thailand	12th	Winners (1996, 2000, 2002, 2014, 2016)
Timor-Leste	2nd	Group stage (2004)
Vietnam	12th	Winners (2008)

== Draw ==
The draw for the tournament was held on 2 May 2018 at Hotel Mulia in Jakarta, Indonesia with the pot placements followed each teams progress in the previous two editions. At the time of the draw the identity of the national team that secured qualification was still to be determined (Timor-Leste).

Pot 1	Pot 2	Pot 3	Pot 4	Pot 5
Thailand (2014 and 2016 holders); Vietnam	Indonesia; Malaysia	Philippines; Myanmar	Singapore; Cambodia	Laos; Timor-Leste (Qualification winner)
Source: 2018 AFF Suzuki Cup

== Squads ==
Each team were allowed a preliminary squad of 50 players. A final squad of 23 players (three of whom must be goalkeepers) must be registered one day before the first match of the tournament.

== Officials ==
The following officials were chosen for the competition.

Referees

- (Australia) Chris Beath
- (Brunei) Amdillah Zainuddin
- (China) Fu Ming
- (China) Ma Ning
- (Indonesia) Thoriq Munir Alkatiri
- (Iran) Alireza Faghani
- (Japan) Hiroyuki Kimura
- (Jordan) Adham Makhadmeh
- (Jordan) Ahmed Al-Ali
- (Malaysia) Amirul Izwan Yaacob
- (Malaysia) Nagor Amir Noor Mohamed
- (Malaysia) Nazmi Nasaruddin
- (Malaysia) Suhaizi Shukri
- (Oman) Ahmed Al-Kaf
- (Philippines) Clifford Daypuyat
- (Qatar) Abdulrahman Al-Jassim
- (Qatar) Khamis Al-Marri
- (Saudi Arabia) Turki Al-Khudhayr
- (Singapore) Ahmad A'qashah
- (Singapore) Nathan Chan
- (South Korea) Kim Hee-gon
- (Thailand) Sivakorn Pu-udom
- (Uzbekistan) Aziz Asimov
- (Vietnam) Nguyễn Hiền Triết

Assistant referees

- (Brunei) Ali Faisal Rosli
- (Brunei) Raffizal Ramli
- (Cambodia) Pisal Kimsy
- (Cambodia) Chi Sopheap
- (China) Zhou Fei
- (Indonesia) Bambang Syamsudar
- (Indonesia) Dinan Lazuardi
- (Indonesia) Malang Nurhadi
- (Iran) Mohammadreza Mansouri
- (Iran) Reza Sokhandan
- (Japan) Akane Yagi
- (Jordan) Ahmed Al-Roalle
- (Laos) Kilar Ladsavong
- (Laos) Somphavanh Louanglath
- (Malaysia) Arif Shamil
- (Malaysia) Azman Ismail
- (Malaysia) Zairul Khalil
- (Myanmar) Chit Moe Aye
- (Myanmar) Win Thiha
- (Myanmar) Zayar Maung
- (Oman) Abu Bakar Al-Amri
- (Philippines) Krizmark Nanola
- (Philippines) Relly Balila
- (Qatar) Saoud Al-Maqaleh
- (Qatar) Taleb Al-Marri
- (Singapore) Abdul Hannan
- (Singapore) Lim Kok Heng
- (Singapore) Manoj Kalwani
- (Singapore) Ronnie Koh Min Kiat
- (Thailand) Komsun Khumpan
- (Thailand) Pattarapong Kijsathit
- (Thailand) Phubes Lekpha
- (Thailand) Phulsawat Samransuk
- (Thailand) Rachen Srichai
- (Thailand) Thanet Chuchueun
- (Vietnam) Nguyễn Trung Hậu
- (Vietnam) Phạm Mạnh Long
- (Vietnam) Trần Liêm Thanh
- (Vietnam) Trương Đức Chiến

Fourth officials

- (Brunei) Abdul Hakim Haidi
- (Cambodia) Chy Samdy
- (Cambodia) Khuon Virak
- (Indonesia) Oki Dwi Putra
- (Laos) Souei Vongkham
- (Laos) Xaypaseuth Phongsanith
- (Malaysia) Fitri Maskon
- (Myanmar) Myat Thu
- (Myanmar) Thant Zin Oo
- (Philippines) Steve Supresencia
- (Singapore) Jansen Foo Chuan Hui
- (Singapore) Letchman Gopalakrishnan
- (Singapore) Muhammad Taqi
- (Thailand) Mongkolchai Pechsri
- (Thailand) Titichai Nuanchan
- (Thailand) Wiwat Jumpao-on

== Venues ==
There are one venue for each participating countries in the tournament with each countries get two group matches played in their home stadium. This is the first time Laos and Cambodia host matches of a final tournament. Before the tournament being held, both the Football Association of Indonesia (PSSI) and Myanmar Football Federation (MFF) have requested AFF to allow their two home matches to be held in two different stadiums in different cities. The Vietnam Football Federation (VFF) also asked AFF to move their final group match against Cambodia to Hàng Đẫy Stadium as the match date is coincides with the opening ceremony of the Vietnam National Games that will be held in Mỹ Đình National Stadium by which the request was accepted through the AFF meeting in Phnom Penh, Cambodia on 13 September. East Timor will play their designated "home" match against Thailand at the Rajamangala Stadium in Bangkok, while their home tie against the Philippines will be played at the Kuala Lumpur Stadium in Malaysia due to the incomplete floodlighting of the Dili Municipal Stadium.

(Malaysia) Kuala Lumpur		(Vietnam) Hanoi	
Bukit Jalil National Stadium	Kuala Lumpur Stadium	Mỹ Đình National Stadium	Hàng Đẫy Stadium
Capacity: 87,411	Capacity: 18,000	Capacity: 40,192	Capacity: 22,500
(Indonesia) Jakarta	Location of stadiums of the 2018 AFF Championship.		(Cambodia) Phnom Penh
Gelora Bung Karno Stadium	Location of stadiums of the 2018 AFF Championship.		Olympic Stadium
Capacity: 77,193	Location of stadiums of the 2018 AFF Championship.		Capacity: 50,000
Singapore	Location of stadiums of the 2018 AFF Championship.		(Thailand) Bangkok
National Stadium	Location of stadiums of the 2018 AFF Championship.		Rajamangala Stadium
Capacity: 55,000	Location of stadiums of the 2018 AFF Championship.		Capacity: 49,722
(Myanmar) Yangon	(Myanmar) Mandalay	(Laos) Vientiane	(Philippines) Bacolod
Thuwunna Stadium	Mandalarthiri Stadium	New Laos National Stadium	Panaad Stadium
Capacity: 32,000	Capacity: 30,000	Capacity: 25,000	Capacity: 9,825

== Group stage ==
Result of teams participating in 2018 AFF Championship: Winners Runners-up / Semi-finals Group stage

Tiebreakers

Ranking in each group was determined as follows:

1. Greater number of points obtained in all the group matches;
2. Goal difference in all the group matches;
3. Greater number of goals scored in all the group matches.

If two or more teams were equal on the basis on the above three criteria, the placement was determined as follows:

1. Result of the direct match between the teams concerned;
2. Penalty shoot-out if only two teams were tied, and they met in the last round of the group;
3. Drawing of lots by the Organising Committee.

=== Group A ===
Pos	Team	Pld	W	D	L	GF	GA	GD	Pts	Qualification
1	Vietnam	4	3	1	0	8	0	+8	10	Knockout phase
2	Malaysia	4	3	0	1	7	3	+4	9	Knockout phase
3	Myanmar	4	2	1	1	7	5	+2	7	
4	Cambodia	4	1	0	3	4	9	−5	3	
5	Laos	4	0	0	4	3	12	−9	0	

Source: AFF
8 November 2018
18:30 UTC+7

Cambodia	0–1	Malaysia
	Report (AFFSZ); Report (AFF)	Norshahrul 31'

Olympic Stadium, Phnom Penh
Attendance: 34,250
Referee: Ahmad A'qashah (Singapore)
8 November 2018
19:30 UTC+7

Laos	0–3	Vietnam
	Report (AFFSZ); Report (AFF)	Nguyễn Công Phượng 11'; Nguyễn Anh Đức 45+2'; Nguyễn Quang Hải 68'

New Laos National Stadium, Vientiane
Attendance: 15,000
Referee: Thoriq Munir Alkatiri (Indonesia)

12 November 2018
20:45 UTC+8

Malaysia	3–1	Laos
Zaquan 15'; Norshahrul 86', 90+2'	Report (AFFSZ); Report (AFF)	Phithack 7'

Bukit Jalil National Stadium, Kuala Lumpur
Attendance: 12,127
Referee: Sivakorn Pu-udom (Thailand)
12 November 2018
18:00 UTC+6:30

Myanmar	4–1	Cambodia
Hlaing Bo Bo 60', 90+3'; Than Htet Aung 70'; Sithu Aung 87'	Report (AFFSZ); Report (AFF)	Vathanaka 23'

Mandalarthiri Stadium, Mandalay
Attendance: 26,946
Referee: Clifford Daypuyat (Philippines)

16 November 2018
19:30 UTC+7

Laos	1–3	Myanmar
Phouthone 14'	Report (AFFSZ); Report (AFF)	Aung Thu 45'; Htet Phyoe Wai 72'; Maung Maung Lwin 84'

New Laos National Stadium, Vientiane
Attendance: 1,294
Referee: Kim Hee-gon (South Korea)
16 November 2018
19:30 UTC+7

Vietnam	2–0	Malaysia
Nguyễn Công Phượng 11'; Nguyễn Anh Đức 60'	Report (AFFSZ); Report (AFF)

Mỹ Đình National Stadium, Hanoi
Attendance: 40,000
Referee: Turki Al-Khudayr (Saudi Arabia)

20 November 2018
18:00 UTC+6:30

Myanmar	0–0	Vietnam
	Report (AFFSZ); Report (AFF)

Thuwunna Stadium, Yangon
Attendance: 29,954
Referee: Khamis Al-Marri (Qatar)
20 November 2018
18:30 UTC+7

Cambodia	3–1	Laos
Vathanaka 17'; Mony Udom 35' (pen.); Sokhpeng 76'	Report (AFFSZ); Report (AFF)	Somxay 75'

Olympic Stadium, Phnom Penh
Attendance: 25,085
Referee: Nathan Chan (Singapore)

24 November 2018
19:30 UTC+7

Vietnam	3–0	Cambodia
Nguyễn Tiến Linh 39'; Nguyễn Quang Hải 41'; Phan Văn Đức 61'	Report (AFFSZ); Report (AFF)

Hàng Đẫy Stadium, Hanoi
Attendance: 14,000
Referee: Ma Ning (China)
24 November 2018
20:30 UTC+8

Malaysia	3–0	Myanmar
Norshahrul 26'; Zaquan 45+3' (pen.), 88'	Report (AFFSZ); Report (AFF)

Bukit Jalil National Stadium, Kuala Lumpur
Attendance: 83,777
Referee: Alireza Faghani (Iran)

=== Group B ===
Pos	Team	Pld	W	D	L	GF	GA	GD	Pts	Qualification
1	Thailand	4	3	1	0	15	3	+12	10	Knockout phase
2	Philippines	4	2	2	0	5	3	+2	8	Knockout phase
3	Singapore	4	2	0	2	7	5	+2	6	
4	Indonesia	4	1	1	2	5	6	−1	4	
5	Timor-Leste	4	0	0	4	4	19	−15	0	

Source: AFF
9 November 2018
20:00 UTC+8

Singapore	1–0	Indonesia
Hariss 37'	Report (AFFSZ); Report (AFF)

National Stadium, Singapore
Attendance: 30,783
Referee: Nguyễn Hiền Triết (Vietnam)
9 November 2018
19:00 UTC+7

Timor-Leste	0–7	Thailand
	Report (AFFSZ); Report (AFF)	Adisak 3', 13', 31', 45', 50', 56' (pen.); Supachai 90+1'

Rajamangala Stadium, Bangkok (Thailand)
Attendance: 8,764
Referee: Nazmi Nasaruddin (Malaysia)

13 November 2018
19:00 UTC+7

Indonesia	3–1	Timor-Leste
Alfath 61'; Lilipaly 69' (pen.); Beto 82'	Report (AFFSZ); Report (AFF)	Gama 48'

Gelora Bung Karno Stadium, Jakarta
Attendance: 15,138
Referee: Aziz Asimov (Uzbekistan)
13 November 2018
20:00 UTC+8

Philippines	1–0	Singapore
Reichelt 78'	Report (AFFSZ); Report (AFF)

Panaad Stadium, Bacolod
Attendance: 4,327
Referee: Suhaizi Shukri (Malaysia)

17 November 2018
20:00 UTC+8

Timor-Leste	2–3	Philippines
Reis 73' (pen.); João Pedro 75'	Report (AFFSZ); Report (AFF)	P. Younghusband 27'; Steuble 33'; De Murga 68'

Kuala Lumpur Stadium, Kuala Lumpur (Malaysia)
Attendance: 312
Referee: Amdillah Zainuddin (Brunei)
17 November 2018
18:30 UTC+7

Thailand	4–2	Indonesia
Korrakot 38'; Pansa 45+2'; Adisak 65'; Pokklaw 74'	Report (AFFSZ); Report (AFF)	Zulfiandi 29'; Fachrudin 89'

Rajamangala Stadium, Bangkok
Attendance: 37,570
Referee: Amirul Izwan Yaacob (Malaysia)

21 November 2018
19:30 UTC+8

Philippines	1–1	Thailand
Bedic 81'	Report (AFFSZ); Report (AFF)	Supachai 57'

Panaad Stadium, Bacolod
Attendance: 3,522
Referee: Nagor Amir Noor Mohamed (Malaysia)
21 November 2018
19:30 UTC+8

Singapore	6–1	Timor-Leste
Safuwan 12', 19', 90+2'; Ikhsan 31', 43'; Faris 90'	Report (AFFSZ); Report (AFF)	Gama 13'

National Stadium, Singapore
Attendance: 18,408
Referee: Amirul Izwan Yaacob (Malaysia)

25 November 2018
19:00 UTC+7

Thailand	3–0	Singapore
Pansa 13'; Supachai 23'; Adisak 90'	Report (AFFSZ); Report (AFF)

Rajamangala Stadium, Bangkok
Attendance: 29,763
Referee: Ahmed Al-Ali (Jordan)
25 November 2018
19:00 UTC+7

Indonesia	0–0	Philippines
	Report (AFFSZ); Report (AFF)

Gelora Bung Karno Stadium, Jakarta
Attendance: 15,436
Referee: Fu Ming (China)

== Knockout stage ==
=== Bracket ===
Semi-finals
A2	Malaysia (a)	0	2	2
B1	Thailand	0	2	2
B2	Philippines	1	1	2
A1	Vietnam	2	2	4

Finals
A2	Malaysia	2	0	2
A1	Vietnam	2	1	3

=== Semi-finals ===
First leg

1 December 2018
20:45 UTC+8

Malaysia	0–0	Thailand
	Report (AFFSZ); Report (AFF)

Bukit Jalil National Stadium, Kuala Lumpur
Attendance: 87,545
Referee: Ahmed Al-Kaf (Oman)
2 December 2018
19:30 UTC+8

Philippines	1–2	Vietnam
Reichelt 45+2'	Report (AFFSZ); Report (AFF)	Nguyễn Anh Đức 12'; Phan Văn Đức 48'

Panaad Stadium, Bacolod
Attendance: 5,489
Referee: Abdulrahman Al-Jassim (Qatar)

Second leg

5 December 2018
19:00 UTC+7

Thailand	2–2	Malaysia
Irfan 21' (o.g.); Pansa 63'	Report (AFFSZ); Report (AFF)	Syahmi 28'; Norshahrul 71'

Rajamangala Stadium, Bangkok
Attendance: 46,157
Referee: Adham Makhadmeh (Jordan)

2–2 on aggregate, Malaysia won on away goals.

6 December 2018
19:30 UTC+7

Vietnam	2–1	Philippines
Nguyễn Quang Hải 84'; Nguyễn Công Phượng 87'	Report (AFFSZ); Report (AFF)	J. Younghusband 89'

Mỹ Đình National Stadium, Hanoi
Attendance: 38,816
Referee: Hiroyuki Kimura (Japan)

Vietnam won 4–2 on aggregate.

=== Finals ===
First leg

11 December 2018
20:45 UTC+8

Malaysia	2–2	Vietnam
Shahrul 36'; Safawi 61'	Report (AFFSZ); Report (AFF)	Nguyễn Huy Hùng 22'; Phạm Đức Huy 25'

Bukit Jalil National Stadium, Kuala Lumpur
Attendance: 88,482
Referee: Chris Beath (Australia)

Second leg

15 December 2018
19:30 UTC+7

Vietnam	1–0	Malaysia
Nguyễn Anh Đức 6'	Report (AFFSZ); Report (AFF)

Mỹ Đình National Stadium, Hanoi
Attendance: 44,625
Referee: Alireza Faghani (Iran)

Vietnam won 3–2 on aggregate.

== Best XI ==
The best XI consisted of the eleven most impressive players at the tournament.

Pos.	Player
GK	(Vietnam) Đặng Văn Lâm
DF	(Malaysia) Syahmi Safari
DF	(Philippines) Álvaro Silva
DF	(Vietnam) Trần Đình Trọng
DF	(Vietnam) Đoàn Văn Hậu
MF	(Malaysia) Safawi Rasid
MF	(Myanmar) Hlaing Bo Bo
MF	(Malaysia) Mohamadou Sumareh
MF	(Vietnam) Nguyễn Quang Hải
MF	(Thailand) Sanrawat Dechmitr
FW	(Malaysia) Norshahrul Idlan

== Statistics ==
=== Winner ===
2018 AFF Championship

Vietnam
2nd title

=== Awards ===
Most Valuable Player	Top Scorer Award	Fair Play Award
(Vietnam) Nguyễn Quang Hải	(Thailand) Adisak Kraisorn	Malaysia

=== Goalscorers ===
There were 80 goals scored in 26 matches, for an average of 3.08 goals per match.

8 goals

- (Thailand) Adisak Kraisorn

5 goals

- (Malaysia) Norshahrul Idlan Talaha

4 goals

- (Vietnam) Nguyễn Anh Đức

3 goals

- (Malaysia) Zaquan Adha Radzak
- (Singapore) Safuwan Baharudin
- (Thailand) Pansa Hemviboon
- (Thailand) Supachai Jaided
- (Vietnam) Nguyễn Công Phượng
- (Vietnam) Nguyễn Quang Hải

2 goals

- (Cambodia) Chan Vathanaka
- (Myanmar) Hlaing Bo Bo
- (Philippines) Patrick Reichelt
- (Singapore) Ikhsan Fandi
- (Timor-Leste) Rufino Gama
- (Vietnam) Phan Văn Đức

1 goal

- (Cambodia) Keo Sokpheng
- (Cambodia) Prak Mony Udom
- (Indonesia) Alfath Fathier
- (Indonesia) Beto Gonçalves
- (Indonesia) Fachrudin Aryanto
- (Indonesia) Stefano Lilipaly
- (Indonesia) Zulfiandi
- (Laos) Phithack Kongmathilath
- (Laos) Phouthone Innalay
- (Laos) Somxay Keohanam
- (Malaysia) Safawi Rasid
- (Malaysia) Shahrul Saad
- (Malaysia) Syahmi Safari
- (Myanmar) Aung Thu
- (Myanmar) Htet Phyoe Wai
- (Myanmar) Maung Maung Lwin
- (Myanmar) Sithu Aung
- (Myanmar) Than Htet Aung
- (Philippines) Jovin Bedic
- (Philippines) Carli de Murga
- (Philippines) Martin Steuble
- (Philippines) James Younghusband
- (Philippines) Phil Younghusband
- (Singapore) Faris Ramli
- (Singapore) Hariss Harun
- (Thailand) Korrakot Wiriyaudomsiri
- (Thailand) Pokklaw Anan
- (Timor-Leste) João Pedro
- (Timor-Leste) Nataniel Reis
- (Vietnam) Nguyễn Huy Hùng
- (Vietnam) Nguyễn Tiến Linh
- (Vietnam) Phạm Đức Huy

1 own goal

- (Malaysia) Irfan Zakaria (playing against Thailand)

Source: AFF

=== Discipline ===
In the final tournament, a player was suspended for the subsequent match in the competition for either getting red card or accumulating two yellow cards in two different matches.

Player	Offences	Suspensions
(Cambodia) Hong Pheng	(yellow card) in Group A v Malaysia; (yellow card) in Group A v Vietnam	Team eliminated from tournament
(Indonesia) Putu Gede	(yellow card) (yellow-red card) in Group B v Singapore	Group B v Timor-Leste
(Laos) Soukaphone Vongchiengkham	(yellow card) in Group A v Malaysia; (yellow card) in Group A v Myanmar	Group A v Cambodia
(Myanmar) Hlaing Bo Bo	(yellow card) in Group A v Vietnam; (yellow card) in Group A v Malaysia	Team eliminated from tournament
(Myanmar) Thein Than Win	(yellow card) in Group A v Cambodia; (yellow card) in Group A v Laos	Group A v Vietnam
(Singapore) Zulqarnaen Suzliman	(yellow card) in Group B v Indonesia; (yellow card) in Group B v Thailand	Team eliminated from tournament
(Timor-Leste) Aderito	(yellow card) (yellow-red card) in Group B v Thailand	Group B v Indonesia
(Timor-Leste) Feliciano Goncalves	(yellow card) in Group B v Thailand; (yellow card) in Group B v Indonesia	Group B v Philippines
(Timor-Leste) Filomeno	(yellow card) in Group B v Philippines; (yellow card) in Group B v Singapore	Team eliminated from tournament
(Timor-Leste) Gumario	(yellow card) in Group B v Thailand; (yellow card) in Group B v Indonesia	Group B v Philippines

• Player who get a card during the semifinals and final doesn't include here.

=== Tournament teams ranking ===
This table will show the ranking of teams throughout the tournament.

Pos	Team	Pld	W	D	L	GF	GA	GD	Pts	Final result
1	Vietnam	8	6	2	0	15	4	+11	20	Champion
2	Malaysia	8	3	3	2	11	8	+3	12	Runner-up
3	Thailand	6	3	3	0	17	5	+12	12	Semi-finalists
4	Philippines	6	2	2	2	7	7	0	8	Semi-finalists
5	Myanmar	4	2	1	1	7	5	+2	7	Eliminated in group stage
6	Singapore	4	2	0	2	7	5	+2	6	Eliminated in group stage
7	Indonesia	4	1	1	2	5	6	−1	4	Eliminated in group stage
8	Cambodia	4	1	0	3	4	9	−5	3	Eliminated in group stage
9	Laos	4	0	0	4	3	12	−9	0	Eliminated in group stage
10	Timor-Leste	4	0	0	4	4	19	−15	0	Eliminated in group stage

Source: AFF

== Marketing ==
AFF Suzuki Cup colour scheme.

New tournament visuals, including a logo, for the AFF Championship was unveiled for the 2018 edition during the official draw held on 2 May 2018. The ASEAN Football Federation cooperated with Lagardère Sports for the tournament's branding. Five attributes were identified that are "synonymous" to the tournament. Elements combined to form the logo are a beating heart, a goalpost and raised hands by a fan that is meant to signify "pride, loyalty, football, rivalry, and passion".

In addition a colour scheme was developed for the branding. The colours devised are magenta (passion and energy), cyan (fresh beginning), green (vibrancy of a football pitch) and blue (topography of the region).

=== Matchballs ===
The official ball for AFF Suzuki Cup 2018 is the Primero Mundo X Star, which is sponsored by Grand Sport Group.

=== Sponsorship ===
Title sponsor	Official sponsors	Official supporters	Regional supporters
Suzuki	Honor; Men's Bioré; Yanmar	AirAsia; Pinaco; UnionPay	100plus; Grand Sport Group

== Media coverage ==
2018 AFF Championship television broadcasters in Southeast Asia
Country	Broadcast network	Television	Radio	Streaming
(Brunei and Malaysia only)	Fox International Channels	Fox Sports Asia (selected matches)	—N/a	—N/a
Brunei	RTB	RTB Aneka (selected matches)	—N/a	—N/a
Cambodia	Bayon Television	BTV News (selected matches)	—N/a	—N/a
Indonesia	MNC Media, Emtek, Kompas Gramedia Group	RCTI (Indonesian matches only); K-Vision	MNC Trijaya FM	MeTube (Indonesian matches only); Vidio (selected matches)
Laos	LNTV	TVLao HD (Laotian matches only)	—N/a	—N/a
Malaysia	RTM	TV1, TV2, RTM HD Sports (all matches)	—N/a	MyKlik (all matches)
Myanmar	MRTV, Sky Net	MRTV, MRTV Sports (two matches only); Sky Net Sports 1, Sky Net Sports 4, Sky Net Sports HD (all matches)	Myanmar Radio	—N/a
Philippines	TV5 Network Inc.	5 Network, AksyonTV (Philippine matches only)	—N/a	ESPN 5 (Philippine matches only)
Singapore	MediaCorp	Okto (Singaporean group stage matches; semi-finals & final)	—N/a	Toggle (Singaporean matches only)
Thailand	BBTV	7HD (Thai matches only)	—N/a	Bugaboo TV (all matches); LINE TV (selected matches)
Timor-Leste	Esperança Timor Oan	ETO+, DTV (East Timorese matches only)	—N/a	—N/a
Vietnam	VTV, VOV, Next Media	VTV5, VTV6, BĐTV, TTTV, VTC3, VTC9, K+PM, THVL2 (all matches)	VOV1, VOV2, VOV3, VOV Transportation, VOV FM 89 (Vietnamese matches only)	VTV Sports, vtv.vn, VTV Go, VTV Giải Trí, THVLi, On Sports, Onme, myK+ (all matches); vov.vn, VTC Now (Vietnamese matches only)
2018 AFF Championship international television broadcasters
Hong Kong	Hong Kong Cable Television	i-Cable Sports (selected matches)	—N/a	i-Cable Web and Mobile (selected matches)
United States	Turner Broadcasting System	—N/a	Bleacher Report (all matches)	
South Korea	Seoul Broadcasting System	SBS (Note: The second-leg final between Vietnam and Malaysia was co-broadcast on SBS and its 9 regional channels), SBS Sports (Vietnamese matches only)		SBS Play (Vietnamese matches only)
N/A = Not available

== Incidents and controversies ==
The Vietnam Football Federation (VFF) was fined VND 220 million (US$10,000) by the ASEAN Football Federation (AFF) for failing to send any Vietnamese players to attend the press conference before the opening match against Laos on 8 November in Vientiane, with a warning that the penalty will be heavier if it happens again. Under AFF rules, any head coach and a starting player from each team must show up at the pre-match press conference one day prior to the match. During the encounter between Myanmar and Vietnam in Group A in Yangon, the Vietnamese side was dissatisfied over the controversial decision made by Qatari referee Khamis Al-Marri after two penalty calls were denied, and another goal was ruled offside by Thai linesman Phubes Lekpha despite video replay showing the Vietnamese player was indeed onside at that time. An argument then occurred between Burmese coach Antoine Hey and Vietnamese coach Park Hang-seo which resulted in Park not shaking hands with Hey after the match. As a result, the availability and importance of video assistant referee (VAR) like in the recent 2018 FIFA World Cup is questioned where many believed it should have been enforced in all international football matches. Prior to the group match between Malaysia and Vietnam in Hanoi, young Vietnamese football fans who waiting over a night to buy tickets are being threatened by local thugs and gangsters and forced to leave. Police scouts was then being dispatched to monitor the gangs activities.

In another situation, 20 Myanmar fans (including women) who were waiting for a bus in Kuala Lumpur to return after the end of the last Group A match between Malaysia and Myanmar when they were physically and verbally attacked by around 30 unidentified assailants. Three of the Myanmar fans were injured and had to be sent to hospital for treatment. The victims decided not to make a police report for its perceived lack of effectiveness on similar cases in the past. Nevertheless, the Secretary of Football Association of Malaysia (FAM), Stuart Michael Ramalingam, made a visit to the victims' representative to apologise, explaining that they have ensured security measures being taken inside the stadium during the game but cannot prevent any untoward incident that happened outside the stadium, thus urging every football supporter to control their behaviour with a sportsmanship spirit. Despite the apology, the Myanmar Football Federation (MFF) sent a letter to the AFF to take action against the host country since it was a repeat of similar fan violence in recent years, urging for a definite end to such violence towards any visiting fans in any future matches hosted by Malaysia, as well as for a heavy penalty to be imposed on them if such problems keep recurring. As stated in their letter, the MFF wrote:

This is not the first or second time this is happening. This matter is not something only Malaysia should be apologising for. It's not only for the fans of our country. We are doing it so that it won't happen again in any host country when other countries come and play. The host country should take extra care and responsibility around the stadium. The hosts also need to take responsibility for the spectators' safety. If this keeps happening in an host country, it will affect the AFF's integrity. No one (the visitor team supporters) will come and watch the matches in the future. Thus, in order to prevent this from happening again, we sent a letter to AFF.

— U Ko Ko Thein, General Secretary of the Myanmar Football Federation.

Following the complaint, FAM were given two warning notices by the AFF with a possible fine of RM21,000 (US$5,000), with the latter warning a direct result of some Malaysian supporters throwing airbomb into the stadium track after the end of the group match against Myanmar. The Football Association of Indonesia (PSSI) was fined Rp116 million (US$8,000) by the AFF after one of their players were found to be using a shirt with sponsor logo during their training session before the group match against Timor-Leste. Under the AFF Disciplinary Code 6.11 (Colour and Shirt Number), each team may not display the sponsor's logo either inside or outside the stadium during official training, games and at press conferences. Another possible fines of Rp73 million (US$5,000) also received by the team after they forgot to put the tournament logo in their home shirt during the match against Timor-Leste. Following the team's poor performance and early elimination in Group B, PSSI chairman Edy Rahmayadi blamed Indonesian media and press as the main cause for the team failure. Coach Bima Sakti's accusation on the Philippines team using many "naturalised players" also angered many Filipino football supporters. Philippines midfielder Stephan Schröck, a Filipino-German, also expressed his anger via social media saying "call us half-bloods all day, but once we've met, only half of you will be left". During the press conference of the first leg final in Malaysia, a dispute between Malaysian and Vietnamese photographer occurred when the latter overshadow Malaysian photographer sights who was standing behind to taking the photo of both teams, causing them to react angrily and saying "Don't stand up!" with another Malaysian photographer wearing a cap with black shirt began to approaching the Vietnamese photographer but was being calmed by the press conference staffs as well Malaysian coach Tan Cheng Hoe who urging everyone to remain calm during the tense situation before making his speech on the upcoming final matches. A video footage on the incident had been circulating on YouTube with another voice also being recorded as saying "Oh no! A stupid photographer!".

Many Malaysian and Vietnamese fans who could not get a single ticket were also disappointed over how ticket management was being conducted by both FAM and VFF. In Malaysia, many of the fans queued up overnight and camped outside the stadium with some becoming unconscious after being trampled by other fans in crowded areas. Similar situation also occurred in Vietnam, hundreds of Vietnam People's Army (VPA) wounded veteran gathered outside the VFF's office gate to buy priority tickets for the second final match since the VFF had announced that it would sell direct tickets to those who had difficulty to buy online tickets. This resulted in chaos when they broke the federation office main gate. Prior to the first final match between the two countries in Malaysia, many Vietnamese fans who came to the stadium were disappointed when they were not allowed to enter despite having tickets, due to what was claimed to be "over-crowding" by the stadium management. One of the fans telling that an auxiliary police officer already said to her the seating area in the second tier at the stadium (directly above the visiting fans' place) is actually allocated for their fans but it seems to be already overtaken by the host fans instead. Both sides fans also expressed their frustration over the no decision taken by Australian referee Chris Beath in two incidents in the first final game such as the scuffle between two players and another foul when the ball hitting one of the Malaysian player hand in their penalty area in the 28th minute.
