= Nguyễn Phong Hồng Duy =

Vietnamese footballer

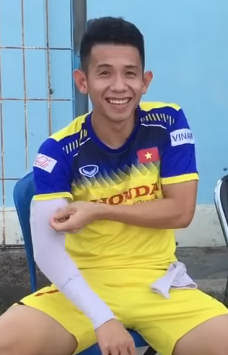
- Hồng Duy in 2019

Personal information
- Full name: Nguyễn Phong Hồng Duy
- Date of birth: 13 June 1996 (age 30)
- Place of birth: Chơn Thành, Bình Phước, Vietnam
- Height: 1.68 m (5 ft 6 in)
- Positions: Left back; left midfielder

Team information
- Current team: Thép Xanh Nam Định
- Number: 7

Youth career
- 2007–2014: Hoàng Anh Gia Lai

Senior career*
Years	Team	Apps	(Gls)
2015–2023	Hoàng Anh Gia Lai	145	(9)
2023–	Thép Xanh Nam Định	84	(3)

International career^{‡}
2013–2014	Vietnam U19	25	(2)
2016–2017	Vietnam U22	4	(0)
2018–2019	Vietnam U23	3	(0)
2017–2023	Vietnam	34	(0)
Medal record
Men's football
Representing Vietnam
AFC U-23 Championship
Runner-up	China 2018	Team
AFF Championship
Winner	ASEAN 2018	Team
Runner-up	ASEAN 2022	Team
- * Club domestic league appearances and goals as of 7 June 2026 ‡ National team caps and goals as of 3 January 2023

Nguyễn Phong Hồng Duy (IPA: [ŋʷiə̌ˀn fɔːŋ hòŋ zʷiː], born 13 June 1996) is a Vietnamese professional footballer who plays as a left back for V.League 1 club Thép Xanh Nam Định.

== International career ==
As of match played 3 January 2023

National team	Year	Apps	Goals
Vietnam
Vietnam	2017	1	0
Vietnam	2018	3	0
Vietnam	2019	7	0
Vietnam	2021	15	0
Vietnam	2022	5	0
Vietnam	2023	1	0
Vietnam	Total	32	0

== International goals ==
=== U-19 ===
#	Date	Venue	Opponent	Score	Result	Competition
1.	12 September 2013	Sidoarjo, Gelora Delta Stadium	Malaysia	1–0	1-0	2013 AFF U-19 Youth Championship
2.	13 August 2014	Bandar Seri Begawan, Hassanal Bolkiah National Stadium	Indonesia	2–0	3-1	2014 Hassanal Bolkiah Trophy
3.	15 August 2014	Bandar Seri Begawan, Hassanal Bolkiah National Stadium	Brunei	1–0	2-2	2014 Hassanal Bolkiah Trophy

== Personal life ==
Hồng Duy married in 2024.

== Honours ==
Thép Xanh Nam Định

- V.League 1: 2023–24, 2024–25
- Vietnamese Super Cup: 2024

Vietnam

- AFF Championship: 2018; runner-up: 2022
- King's Cup runner-up: 2019

Vietnam U23

- AFC U-23 Championship runner-up: 2018

Vietnam U19

- AFF U-19 Youth Championship runner-up (2): 2013, 2014
- Hassanal Bolkiah Trophy runner-up: 2014
