= Airbomb =

Type of firework

An airbomb is a type of firework. It is simply a concentration of flash powder, in a paper case, that is ejected into the air with a black-powder lifting charge, ignited by a fuse. The flash powder explodes in midair with a loud bang and a bright white flash.

Single-tube airbombs were banned in Britain in 2004, because they are classed as a cheap nuisance firework. Multishot airbombs are still legal in Britain. The airbomb effect, a loud bang and flash, is still part of many larger fireworks.

Since 1 April 2008, any firework having at least one tube containing over 5% flash powder has been classed under United Nations regulations as 1.3G, with stricter transportation and storage regulation. This effectively means that any firework containing a flash powder effect is not now legally available for sale. As such, manufacturers have replaced the "bang" with a crackle effect, or switched to using black-powder bursts. However, these are more expensive and lack the traditional flash effect.
