= Irfan Zakaria =

Malaysian footballer

Personal information
- Full name: Muhammad Irfan bin Zakaria
- Date of birth: 4 June 1995 (age 31)
- Place of birth: Kuala Lumpur, Malaysia
- Height: 1.83 m (6 ft 0 in)
- Positions: Defensive midfielder; centre-back

Team information
- Current team: Kuching City

Youth career
- 2013: Selangor U-19

Senior career*
Years	Team	Apps	(Gls)
2014–2015	Harimau Muda B	15	(0)
2015	Harimau Muda	20	(0)
2016–2019	Kuala Lumpur City	65	(0)
2020	Kedah Darul Aman	9	(0)
2021–2022	Kuala Lumpur City	39	(0)
2023	Sabah	14	(0)
2024–2025	Kedah Darul Aman	19	(0)
2025–2026	Melaka	1	(0)
2026–	Kuching City	0	(0)

International career^{‡}
2017–2018	Malaysia U23	15	(0)
2018–	Malaysia	13	(1)
Medal record
Men's football
Representing Malaysia
AFF Championship
Runner-up	2018
Malaysia under-23
Sea Games
Silver medal – second place	2017
- * Club domestic league appearances and goals as of 14 August 2025 ‡ National team caps and goals as of 11 June 2021

Muhammad Irfan bin Zakaria (born 4 June 1995) is a Malaysian professional footballer who plays for Malaysia Super League club Kuching City, and the Malaysia national team. His primarily position as a defensive midfielder but can also play as a centre-back.

== Club career ==
=== Return to Kuala Lumpur City ===
On 17 January 2021, it was announced Irfan has joined newly promoted club, Kuala Lumpur City for a second stint. On 16 March, Irfan made his second debut for the club in a 1–0 league defeat to Penang.

=== Sabah ===
On 2 December 2022, Irfan signed a contract with Sabah.

=== Kedah Darul Aman ===
On 5 March 2024, Irfan officially signed a contract with Kedah Darul Aman.

== International career ==
Irfan represented Malaysian at under-23 and senior level.

== Career statistics ==
=== Club ===
As of match played 2 June 2023

Club	Season	League		Cup		League Cup		Continental		Total	
Club	Season	Apps	Goals	Apps	Goals	Apps	Goals	Apps	Goals	Apps	Goals
Harimau Muda B	2014	12	0	0	0	0	0	–	–	12	0
Harimau Muda B	2015	3	0	0	0	0	0	–	–	3	0
Harimau Muda B	Total	15	0	0	0	0	0	0	0	15	0
Harimau Muda	2015	20	0	0	0	0	0	–	–	20	0
Harimau Muda	Total	20	0	0	0	0	0	0	0	20	0
Kuala Lumpur City	2016	10	0	0	0	5	0	–	–	15	0
Kuala Lumpur City	2017	15	0	1	0	5	0	–	–	21	0
Kuala Lumpur City	2018	19	0	4	0	2	0	–	–	25	0
Kuala Lumpur City	2019	21	0	4	2	5	0	–	–	30	2
Kuala Lumpur City	Total	65	0	9	2	17	0	0	0	91	2
Kedah Darul Aman	2020	9	0	0	0	1	0	2 (Note: Appearances in AFC Champions League)	0	12	0
Kedah Darul Aman	Total	9	0	0	0	1	0	2	0	12	0
Kuala Lumpur City	2021	21	0	0	0	0	0	0	0	21	0
Kuala Lumpur City	2022	18	0	1	0	3	0	7	0	29	0
Kuala Lumpur City	Total	39	0	1	0	3	0	7	0	50	0
Sabah	2023	10	0	0	0	0	0	0	0	10	0
Career total		158	0	10	2	21	0	9	0	198	2

=== International ===
As of match played 28 May 2021

Malaysia
Year	Apps	Goals
2018	10	1
2019	2	0
2021	1	0
Total	13	1

==== International goals ====
Scores and results list Malaysia's goal tally first.

No	Date	Venue	Opponent	Score	Result	Competition
1.	1 April 2018	Bukit Jalil National Stadium, Kuala Lumpur, Malaysia	Bhutan	3–0	7–0	Friendly

== Honours ==
Kuala Lumpur City

- Malaysia Cup: 2021
- Malaysia Premier League: 2017
- AFC Cup runner-up: 2022

Kedah Darul Aman

- Malaysia Super League runner-up: 2020

Malaysia U-23

- SEA Games : (silver) Silver 2017

Malaysia

- AFF Championship runner-up: 2018
