= Đặng Văn Lâm =

Vietnamese footballer

Đặng Văn Lâm Лев Шонович Данг
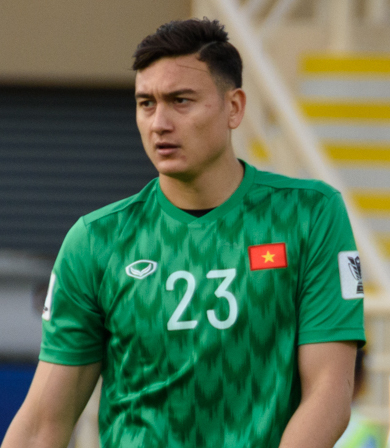
- Văn Lâm with Vietnam at the 2019 AFC Asian Cup

Personal information
- Birth name: Vietnamese: Đặng Văn Lâm; Russian: Лев Шонович Данг
- Date of birth: 13 August 1993 (age 33)
- Place of birth: Moscow, Russia
- Height: 1.88 m (6 ft 2 in)
- Position: Goalkeeper

Team information
- Current team: Ninh Bình
- Number: 1

Youth career
- 2002–2007: Spartak Moscow
- 2007–2010: Dynamo Moscow
- 2010–2011: Hoàng Anh Gia Lai

Senior career*
Years	Team	Apps	(Gls)
2011–2013	Hoàng Anh Gia Lai	0	(0)
2012	→ Hoàng Anh Attapeu (loan)	21	(0)
2013–2014	Duslar Moscow	12	(0)
2014–2015	Rodina Moskva	12	(0)
2015–2019	Hải Phòng	76	(0)
2019–2021	Muangthong United	42	(0)
2021–2022	Cerezo Osaka	2	(0)
2022–2024	Quy Nhơn Bình Định	46	(0)
2024–	Ninh Bình	44	(0)

International career^{‡}
2011	Vietnam U19	2	(0)
2018	Vietnam U23	1	(0)
2017–	Vietnam	48	(0)
Medal record
Men's football
Representing Vietnam
AFF Championship
Winner	ASEAN 2018	Team
Runner-up	ASEAN 2022	Team
- * Club domestic league appearances and goals as of 7 June 2026 ‡ National team caps and goals as of 26 March 2026

Đặng Văn Lâm (Vietnamese: [ɗɐˀːŋ vɐn lə̄m], born 13 August 1993), also known as Lev Shonovich Dang (Russian: Лев Шонович Данг), is a professional footballer who plays as a goalkeeper for V.League 1 club Ninh Bình. Born in Russia, he plays for the Vietnam national team.

== Club career ==
Đặng Văn Lâm began his career with Hoang Anh Gia Lai, but after early promise he was loaned out to the sister team in Laos and his progress stalled. Văn Lâm then returned to his birthplace to join teams in the lower divisions of Russian football, and in 2015 he rejoined Vietnam Hải Phòng. After failing to get a game his first season he became a starter for the 2016 season and earned a surprise call up shortly after for the national team by coach Toshiya Miura.

Văn Lâm's greatest strength is his height and his arm span is nearly two meters (1.93), but he is hampered by slow reflexes and hesitancy to rush off his line. His U-19 coach, Triệu Quang Hà said that Văn Lâm has potential but he has to improve his game if he wishes to play regularly.

In September 2017, after an incident with Lê Sỹ Mạnh, one of the club's staffs, and other defenders in Hai Phong, Văn Lâm left and returned to Russia. The contract lasted for a year before he returned to the club.

=== Muangthong United ===
On 7 June 2019, Thai League 1 club Muangthong United announced that Van Lam had signed a three-year contract.

=== Cerezo Osaka ===
On January 27, 2021, FIFA temporarily granted Văn Lâm an ITC (international transfer certificate), paving the way for him to sign a contract with Cerezo Osaka. On January 30, 2021, Japanese club Cerezo Osaka announced the successful signing of Đặng Văn Lâm. He officially became the first Vietnamese player to play for a J1 League club, the top tier of Japanese football.

On June 9, 2021, Đặng Văn Lâm was given the opportunity to start in goal for Cerezo Osaka against Gainare Tottori in the second round of the JFA Emperor's Cup. This was also his first appearance for Cerezo Osaka since joining the club in January. The second time Văn Lâm was given the opportunity to start in goal for Cerezo Osaka was against Guangzhou FC in the group stage of the 2021 AFC Champions League.

=== Bình Định ===
Đặng Văn Lâm signed a three-year contract with Topenland Bình Định on August 15, 2022, but was unable to make his V-League 2022 debut due to an injury in training on August 24, Prior to that, he contracted COVID-19 and missed the match in round 13 against Thanh Hóa. He helped Bình Định win 3–0 away to Hà Nội in round 15 on the evening of September 2 and helped them beat Viettel to reach the semi-finals of the 2022 National Cup thanks to a penalty shootout. In the 2023–24 V.League 1 season, Văn Lâm was chosen by Bình Định's head coach Bùi Đoàn Quang Huy to be the new team captain. He appeared in 19 league games during the season as the team finished as V.League's runners-up for the first time in the history.

=== Phù Đổng Ninh Bình ===
On 13 August 2024, Văn Lâm joined LPBank Hồ Chí Minh City in the V.League 2, signing a four-year contract. However, a month later, the entire LPBank HCMC players and staffs was swapped with the ones of Phù Đổng Ninh Bình, resulting in Văn Lâm's move to the club.

== International career ==
He began to play for Vietnam's national team in 2015 as Vietnam was seeking players of Vietnamese descent abroad. Together with Czech-born Mạc Hồng Quân, he is one of two prominent overseas Vietnamese players selected to the national team.

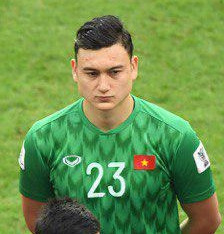
Đặng Văn Lâm playing for Vietnam during a match against Japan in 2019.

In June 2017, he made his debut in the 2019 AFC Asian Cup qualification against Jordan at Ho Chi Minh City, where his ability helped to keep a clean sheet as the match ended 0–0. He was praised for his skills. However, it was not until the 2018 AFF Championship that his potential had earned him reputation, helping Vietnam to conquer Southeast Asia after ten years from their maiden title.

During the round of 16 of the 2019 AFC Asian Cup, once again facing against Jordan, he made a crucial save against Ahmed Samir on the penalty shootout after 120 minutes of game time to help Vietnam qualify for the quarter-finals.

He became instrumental in Vietnam's current 2022 FIFA World Cup qualification 2nd round where he produced a strong performance, including a phenomenon foot-like penalty save in Vietnam's crucial game against rival Thailand at home which has been compared to Igor Akinfeev's penalty save against Spain in the 2018 FIFA World Cup due to similar save. In the second half of the second round qualification, Dang Van Lam had to withdraw from the roster after one of his teammate in Cerezo Osaka contracted COVID-19.

== Personal life ==
Đặng Văn Lâm was born in Moscow to a Vietnamese father Đặng Văn Sơn and a Russian mother Olga Zhukova. Both of his parents were involved in performing arts, with his mother being a former ballet dancer. He also has two siblings, a younger brother and a younger sister. His Russian name, Lev, is contributed to his mother's passionate admiration to the legend Soviet goalkeeper Lev Yashin, whom himself also admired.

He has been in a relationship with Bùi Thị Yến Xuân since 2018, whom he married in Nha Trang on 7 July 2024.

Although greatly influenced by family's artistic involvement, he chose to follow football instead. He is known for his good singing voice. He can speak three languages, Vietnamese, Russian and English.

He is an Orthodox Christian, often makes the sign of the cross during matches, making him the first Vietnamese Orthodox Christian footballer in the national team.

As a half-Russian, he is also a fan of Russia national football team. He typically salutes the national team in the style of Artem Dzyuba, who is also an idol for Đặng Văn Lâm himself.

== Career statistics ==
=== Club ===
As of match played 31 October 2026

Appearances and goals by club, season and competition
Club	Season	League			National cup		Continental		Other		Total	
Club	Season	Division	Apps	Goals	Apps	Goals	Apps	Goals	Apps	Goals	Apps	Goals
Muangthong United	2019	Thai League 1	30	0	3	0	—		1 (Note: Appearances in Thai League Cup)	0	34	0
Muangthong United	2020–21	Thai League 1	12	0	0	0	—		—		0	0
Muangthong United	Total		42	0	3	0	—		1	0	46	0
Cerezo Osaka	2021	J1 League	0	0	1	0	1 (Note: Appearances in AFC Champions League)	0	—		2	0
Cerezo Osaka	2022	J1 League	0	0	0	0	—		—		0	0
Cerezo Osaka	Total		0	0	1	0	1	0	—		2	0
Binh Dinh	2022	V.League 1	10	0	3	0	—		—		13	0
Binh Dinh	2023	V.League 1	19	0	3	0	—		—		22	0
Binh Dinh	2023–24	V.League 1	19	0	0	0	—		—		28	0
Binh Dinh	Total		48	0	6	0	—		—		54	0
Ninh Binh	2024–25	V.League 2	19	0	3	0	—		—		22	0
Ninh Binh	2025–26	V.League 1	25	0	4	0	—		—		29	0
Ninh Binh	2026–27	V.League 1	6	0	0	0	—		—		6	0
Ninh Binh	Total		50	0	7	0	—		—		57	0
Career total			140	0	17	0	1	0	1	0	159	0

=== International ===
As of match played 26 March 2026

Appearances and goals by national team and year
National team	Year	Apps	Goals
Vietnam	2017	2	0
Vietnam	2018	10	0
Vietnam	2019	12	0
Vietnam	2021	1	0
Vietnam	2022	7	0
Vietnam	2023	11	0
Vietnam	2024	2	0
Vietnam	2025	2	0
Vietnam	2026	1	0
Total		48	0

== Honours ==
Cerezo Osaka

- J.League Cup runner-up: 2021

Bình Định

- Vietnamese National Cup runner-up: 2022

Ninh Bình

- V.League 2: 2024–25
- Vietnamese National Cup runner-up: 2025–26

Vietnam Olympic

- VFF Cup: 2018

Vietnam

- AFF Championship: 2018, 2026; runner-up: 2022
- King's Cup runner-up: 2019
- VFF Cup: 2022

Individual

- AFF Championship Best XI: 2018
- ASEAN Football Federation Best XI: 2019
- AFF Championship All-Star XI: 2022
- Vietnamese Bronze Ball: 2023
- V.League 2 Team of the Season: 2024–25

== See also ==
- List of Vietnam footballers born outside Vietnam
