= Tan Cheng Hoe =

Malaysian footballer and manager

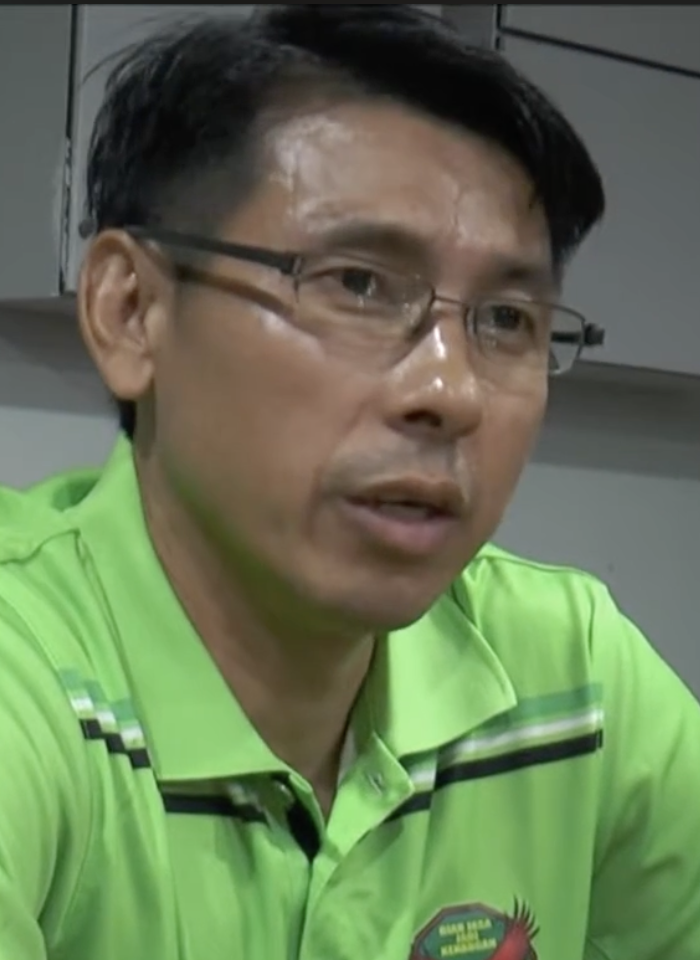
- Tan Cheng Hoe in 2014

Personal information
- Full name: Tan Cheng Hoe 陈清和
- Date of birth: 30 May 1968 (age 58)
- Place of birth: Alor Setar, Kedah, Malaysia
- Position: Midfielder

Team information
- Current team: Malaysia (interim head coach)

Senior career*
Years	Team	Apps	(Gls)
1988–1995	Kedah		
1996	Perlis		
1997	Penang		
1998	Kuala Lumpur		
1999	Kelantan		
2000–2001	Kedah		

International career
1986	Malaysia U-18		
1991	Malaysia B		
1991	Malaysia XI	1	(0)

Managerial career
- 2004–2006: Malaysia U-19 (assistant)
- 2007–2009: Harimau Muda A (assistant)
- 2009–2011: Malaysia U-23 (assistant)
- 2009–2013: Malaysia (assistant)
- 2014–2017: Kedah
- 2017: Malaysia (assistant)
- 2018–2022: Malaysia
- 2022–2024: Selangor
- 2024: Police Tero
- 2025–: Malaysia (technical director)
- 2025–: Malaysia U-23 (assistant)
- 2026–: Malaysia (interim)
Medal record
Men's football
Representing Malaysia (as manager)
FIFA ASEAN Cup
Third place	2026
AFF Championship
Runner-up	2018
- * Club domestic league appearances and goals

Tan Cheng Hoe (Chinese: 陈清和) is a Malaysian football manager and former football player who is the interim head coach of Malaysia and also as its technical director. He is also the assistant coach of Malaysia U23. He was the assistant coach for the Malaysia national team during K. Rajagopal and Nelo Vingada era before he was chosen as the head coach of the national team.

== Club career ==
=== Kedah ===
As a player, Tan played for Kedah in three Malaysia Cup finals from 1988 to 1990. He lost the 1988 and 1989 finals, but finally won the trophy in 1990.

Tan made an appearance for Malaysia Selection in a match against Aston Villa on 20 May 1991. In September 1991, he was part of Malaysia B team managed by M. Karathu for TAAN Cup, an invitational tournament in Kathmandu Nepal. Malaysia B team won the tournament beating Tiong Bahru of Singapore 2–0.

== Managerial career ==
=== Early coaching ===
Tan began his career at Kedah in 2003. Kedah were also keen for Tan Cheng Hoe to stay in football and offered him the role of coach which he held until October 2004.

=== Malaysia national team ===
Tan was the assistant coach to K. Rajagopal from 2004 to 2013. Tan worked as an Under 19s coach for Malaysia from December 2004 until October 2009. Tan continued his development as coach for Harimau Muda from October 2007 until October 2009. Under Rajagopal and Tan, Malaysia achieved many good results such as reaching the quarter-finals of 2004 AFC Youth Championship and qualifying for the 2006 AFC Youth Championship. Malaysia also ended their trophy drought in regional football by winning the 2009 SEA Games and 2010 AFF Championship.

=== Kedah ===
A break from football lasting 5 years then followed with Tan's next role as manager at second-tier Malaysia Premier League club, Kedah beginning in April 2014. In 2015, he guided Kedah to win the 2015 Malaysia Premier League which also gain promotion to the 2016 Malaysia Super League. He was named the M-League's Best Coach of the Year at the 2016 National Football Awards following the success in Malaysia Cup, finishing third in the Super League and reached the FA Cup semi-finals.

=== Malaysia national team ===
Tan began his 2nd spell with Malaysia in April 2017 as he took up the position of assistant manager under Nelo Vingada. Tan was then made the head coach of Malaysia after Vingada stepped down following a string of poor results.

In the preparation for the 2018 AFF Championship, Tan mentioned through an article published by the FOX Sports Asia that Malaysia were the clear underdogs, encouraging fans to manage their expectations and not put too much hope despite being drawn into a favourable Group A consisting of Vietnam, Myanmar, Cambodia and Laos, adding the favourites in the group would be Vietnam. Surprisingly, Tan managed to lead Malaysia into the final after eliminating the tournament-defenders as well as five-time champions Thailand in the semi-finals.

The momentum in the AFF Championship continued in the first leg of the finals, when the Malaysian team managed to hold the tournament favourites Vietnam to a 2–2 at home in their second match-up of the tournament despite the latter had already scoring two goals in the first half. However, in the second leg in Hanoi, Tan's team failed to repeat the same success when the favourites scored a goal in the 6th minute and began tightening their defence, resulting in a 2–3 aggregate until the end of the match as a result of which Malaysia became the runners-up for the third time.

Tan continued to lead the Malaysian team in the 2022 FIFA World Cup qualification after the Football Association of Malaysia (FAM) offered a two-year contract extension until 2020. Although the team under his management was able to thrash Timor-Leste 12–2 on aggregate in the first round of qualification, Tan was only able to defeat Indonesia 3–2 in an away match before losing two matches against United Arab Emirates at home by 1–2 and against Vietnam by 0–1 in an away match. After the two consecutive defeats, he then led Malaysia to win one of the most iconic matches in Malaysian footballing history, beating neighbour and Southeast Asian powerhouse Thailand 2–1, extending its unbeaten streak at home to Thailand. Tan's team also beat Indonesia 2–0 at home, keeping Malaysia's World Cup dream alive.

Over the course of his tenure as manager of the Malaysian national team, Tan was credited with breathing new life into Malaysian football, improving the country's FIFA World Ranking from its all-time low of 178th to 153rd.

On 3 January 2022, Tan has resigned as the head coach of Football Association of Malaysia (FAM) following Malaysia's failure to qualify for the semi-finals of the AFF Cup 2020 in Singapore.

=== Selangor ===
On 24 September 2022, Tan Cheng Hoe appointed as Selangor first team head coach. Tan, who took the helm of Selangor in September 2022, had been instrumental in the club's recent successes, notably leading them to runner-up positions in both the 2022 Malaysia Cup and the 2023 Malaysia Super League. Such feats not only elevated the team's standing but also secured their spot in the prestigious AFC Champions League Two for 2024/2025 season group stage. The mutual decision for Cheng Hoe to leave was made smoother with a compensation fee received by Selangor upon his contract termination, highlighting the amicable nature of his departure.

Tan won his second FAM Best Coach Award during his stint at Selangor during the 2023 Malaysia Super League season.

=== Police Tero ===
On 29 February 2024, Thai League 1 club Police Tero announced the appointment of Tan as the head coach and designated Worrawoot Srimaka as the technical director. He secured nine points from his games in charge, which were ultimately not enough to keep the team in the league, with the club's relegation confirmed on 13 May 2024.

=== Malaysia national team ===
On 24 April 2025, as part of a new management structure, the FAM appointed Tan as the national team's Technical Director to assist newly appointed foreign coaches in familiarising themselves with Malaysian football. He will also be tasked with assisting the manager of the U-23 national team.

After Peter Cklamovski's departure to EFL League Two side Salford City, on 25 June 2026, Tan was appointed as the interim coach for the national team, with the FAM citing his vast experience, proven track record and deep understanding of the country’s football landscape as the main factors for the decision.

He led the national team in the 16th edition of the ASEAN Championship. On 11 July 2026, Tan named a 26-man squad for a centralised training camp in preparation for the tournament. With the ASEAN Championship taking place outside the FIFA International Match Calendar, many clubs were reluctant to release their first-team players. In response, Tan selected several uncapped or lesser-used players, including Richard Chin and Wan Kuzain, to broaden the national team's player pool.

Under Tan's leadership, Malaysia advanced from the group stage to the semi-finals. Malaysia ultimately lost 4-0 on aggregate to eventual tournament champions Vietnam.

During the tournament, Tan was credited and applauded for giving opportunities to younger and more inexperienced players, helping develop local football talent.

== Managerial statistics ==
As of match played 17 November 2026

Managerial record by team and tenure
Team	Nat.	From	To	Record					Ref.
Team	Nat.	From	To	G	W	D	L	Win %	Ref.
Kedah	(Malaysia)	10 April 2014	29 April 2017	106	59	28	19	55.66	
Malaysia	(Malaysia)	7 December 2017	3 January 2022	40	20	4	16	50.00	
Selangor	(Malaysia)	24 September 2022	28 February 2024	44	30	4	10	68.18	
Police Tero	(Thailand)	29 February 2024	6 June 2024	11	2	3	6	18.18	
Malaysia (interim)	(Malaysia)	25 June 2026	Present	12	7	1	4	58.33	
Career Total				213	118	40	55	55.40	

== Honours ==
=== Manager ===
Kedah

- Malaysia Premier League: 2015
- Malaysia Cup: 2016
- Malaysia Charity Shield: 2017

Malaysia

- FIFA ASEAN Cup third place : 2026
- AFF Championship runner-up: 2018

Individual

- FAM Football Awards – Best Coach: 2016, 2023
