= Phan Văn Đức =

Vietnamese footballer (born 1996)

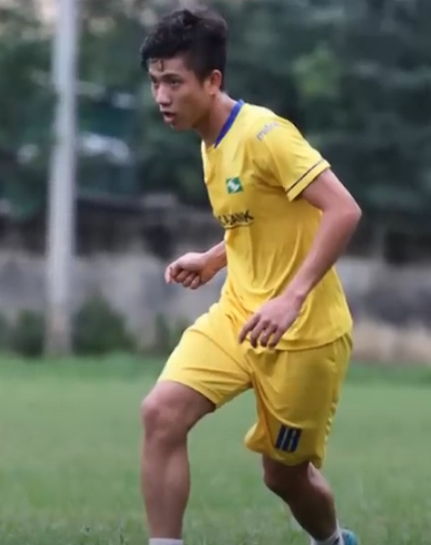
- Văn Đức with Sông Lam Nghệ An in 2019

Personal information
- Full name: Phan Văn Đức
- Date of birth: 11 April 1996 (age 30)
- Place of birth: Yên Thành, Nghệ An, Vietnam
- Height: 1.73 m (5 ft 8 in)
- Positions: Winger; forward

Team information
- Current team: Công An Hồ Chí Minh City
- Number: 8

Youth career
- 2007–2015: Sông Lam Nghệ An

Senior career*
Years	Team	Apps	(Gls)
2015	→ Công An Nhân Dân (loan)		
2016–2023	Sông Lam Nghệ An	100	(27)
2023–2026	Công An Hà Nội	52	(5)
2026–	Công An Hồ Chí Minh City	0	(0)

International career^{‡}
2014–2016	Vietnam U19	6	(2)
2018–2019	Vietnam U23	10	(4)
2018–2023	Vietnam	45	(5)
Medal record
Men's football
Representing Vietnam
AFC U-23 Championship
Runner-up	2018 China	Team
AFF Championship
Winner	2018 ASEAN	Team
Runner-up	2022 ASEAN	Team
- * Club domestic league appearances and goals as of 7 June 2026 ‡ National team caps and goals as of 16 January 2023

Phan Văn Đức (born 11 April 1996) is a Vietnamese professional footballer who plays as a winger or a forward for V.League 1 club Công An Hồ Chí Minh City.

== Club career ==
Born in Nghệ An, Văn Đức was an academy product of local team Sông Lam Nghệ An. After the successful loan spell at V.League 2 team Công An Nhân Dân in 2015, he was promoted to Sông Lam Nghệ An's first team for the 2016 V.League 1. In his first season at Vietnamese top tier, he was the under-19 player with the most game time of the team. Văn Đức was formed to play as a forward, but was moved down to play as an attacking midfielder by coaches, allowing to have more game time as he had difficulty competing upfront with foreign players. In the following season, he scored 2 goals in the 2017 Vietnamese Cup final against Becamex Binh Duong, helping his club win the title. In the season after, he netted 9 goals in the league, the highest of his career. Văn Đức's last season at Sông Lam Nghệ An was in 2022, when he scored 7 goals and helped his club finished 5th in the league.

In November 2022, Văn Đức signed for V.League 1 newly promoted team Công An Hà Nội. After 3 games with the club in the 2023 season, he was ruled out for the rest of the season due to a anterior cruciate ligament injury, and only returned back in March 2024.

On 17 July 2026, Văn Đức joined Công An Hồ Chí Minh City.

== International career ==
In 2018, Văn Đức took part in the AFC U-23 Championship runners-up campaign with Vietnam U23, scoring a goal in the quarter-finals game against Iraq. At the same year, he made his debut with Vietnam national team and participated in the 2018 AFF Championship as Vietnam won the title with Văn Đức contributing 2 goals to the campaign. He then participated in the 2019 AFC Asian Cup, where Vietnam managed to reach the quarter-finals.

== Career statistics ==
As of match played 16 January 2023

National team	Year	Apps	Goals
Vietnam	2018	9	2
Vietnam	2019	5	0
Vietnam	2021	15	1
Vietnam	2022	9	2
Vietnam	2023	5	0
Total		43	5

== International goals ==
=== U-23 ===
Scores and results list Vietnam's goal tally first. Only results against national teams were counted

#	Date	Venue	Opponent	Score	Result	Competition
1.	20 January 2018	Changshu Stadium, Changshu, China	Iraq	2–2	3–3 (5–3 pen.)	2018 AFC U-23 Championship
2.	7 August 2018	Hanoi, Vietnam	Uzbekistan	1–1	1–1	2018 Vinaphone Cup
3.	16 August 2018	Cikarang, Indonesia	Nepal	2–0	2–0	2018 Asian Games

=== Vietnam ===
Scores and results list Vietnam's goal tally first.

No.	Date	Venue	Opponent	Score	Result	Competition
1.	24 November 2018	Hàng Đẫy Stadium, Hanoi, Vietnam	Cambodia	3–0	3–0	2018 AFF Championship
2.	2 December 2018	Panaad Stadium, Bacolod, Philippines	Philippines	2–1	2–1	2018 AFF Championship
3.	6 December 2021	Bishan Stadium, Bishan, Singapore	Laos	2–0	2–0	2020 AFF Championship
4.	1 February 2022	Mỹ Đình National Stadium, Hanoi, Vietnam	China	3–0	3–1	2022 FIFA World Cup qualification
5.	27 September 2022	Thống Nhất Stadium, Ho Chi Minh City, Vietnam	India	1–0	3–0	2022 VFF Tri-Nations Series

== Honours ==
Sông Lam Nghệ An

- Vietnamese Cup: 2017

Công An Hà Nội

- V.League 1: 2023, 2025–26
- Vietnamese Cup: 2024–25
- Vietnamese Super Cup: 2025

Vietnam U23

- VFF Cup: 2018
- AFC U-23 Asian Cup runners-up: 2018
- Asian Games fourth place: 2018

Vietnam

- AFF Championship: 2018; runners-up: 2022
- VFF Cup: 2022
