= Nguyễn Huy Hùng =

Vietnamese footballer (born 1992)

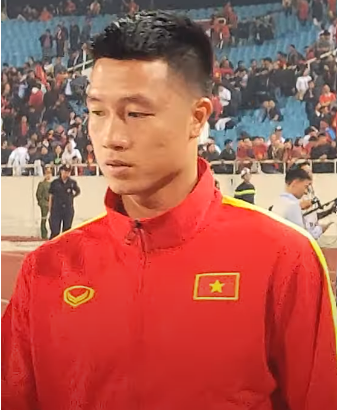
- Huy Hùng in 2019

Personal information
- Full name: Nguyễn Huy Hùng
- Date of birth: 2 March 1992 (age 34)
- Place of birth: Đông Anh, Hanoi, Vietnam
- Height: 1.74 m (5 ft 9 in)
- Position: Central midfielder

Team information
- Current team: PVF-CAND
- Number: 29

Youth career
- 2006–2012: Hanoi ACB

Senior career*
Years	Team	Apps	(Gls)
2013–2014	Hà Nội	21	(6)
2015–2020	Quảng Nam	118	(8)
2021–2022	SHB Đà Nẵng	15	(0)
2023–2024	Viettel	9	(0)
2025–	PVF-CAND	18	(0)

International career^{‡}
2013–2015	Vietnam U23	3	(1)
2014–2019	Vietnam	24	(2)
Medal record
Men's football
Representing Vietnam
Southeast Asian Games
Bronze medal – third place	Singapore 2015	Team
AFF Championship
Winner	ASEAN 2018	Team
- * Club domestic league appearances and goals as of 12 June 2026 ‡ National team caps and goals as of 25 January 2019

Nguyễn Huy Hùng (born 2 March 1992) is a Vietnamese professional footballer who plays as a central midfielder for V.League 1 club PVF-CAND.

Nguyễn Huy Hùng earned 24 caps for Vietnam between 2014 and 2019, scoring two international goals. He was a member of the nation's squads at 2018 AFF Championship, helping the team win the tournament.

== Honours ==
Quảng Nam

- V.League 1: 2017
- Vietnamese National Cup runner-up: 2019
- Vietnamese Super Cup: 2018

Vietnam U23

- Southeast Asian Games Bronze medal: 2015

Vietnam

- AFF Championship: 2018

== International goals ==
#	Date	Venue	Opponent	Score	Result	Competition
1.	25 November 2014	Mỹ Đình National Stadium, Hanoi, Vietnam	Laos	3–0	3–0	2014 AFF Championship
2.	11 December 2018	Bukit Jalil National Stadium, Kuala Lumpur, Malaysia	Malaysia	1–0	2–2	2018 AFF Championship
