= 2018 MFF Charity Cup =

Shan United	Yangon United
2	2
- Date: 7 January 2018
- Venue: Aung San Stadium, Yangon
- Man of the Match: (Guinea) Sekou Sylla
- Referee: (Myanmar) Mr. Kyaw Zwal Lwin
- Attendance: 15,000
- Weather: Sunny; 29 °C (84 °F)

The 2018 MFF Charity Cup (also known as the 2018 MPT Charity Cup for sponsorship reasons) is the 7th Charity Cup, an annual football match played between the winners of the previous National League and Domestic Cup competitions. It was held at Aung San Stadium on 7 January 2018. The match was played between Shan United, champions of the 2018 Myanmar National League and Yangon United, runner-up of the 2018 Myanmar National League.

This was Yangon United's 4th Cup appearance and Shan United's 2nd time Cup appearance, they won Charity Cup for the first time as Kanbawza FC in 2016.

== Background and pre-match ==
Shan United qualified for the 2018 MFF Charity Cup as winners of the 2017 Myanmar National League. It was the club's first time ever league title in 9 years. The other Charity Cup place went to Yangon United, who was defeated by Shan United in Domestic final and a runner-up of 2017 Myanmar National League.

Yangon United made their fifth appearance in the Charity Cup; prior to this they won twice (2013, 2016) and lost twice, most recently in 2016 against Ayeyawady United. By contrast, Shan United made their twice Chairity Cup appearance, and won once (2014). They went into the match as holders of the MNL Champion, having defeated Yangon United a year earlier. Both clubs had only one time met before in the Shield, when Shan United (as Kanbawza FC) won 2-0 in 2014.

MFF donates Ticket fees to Orphan School and other places

The 2017 edition was the first competitive fixture in English football to trial the ABBA penalty shoot-out system, provided scores were level after 90 minutes. The format is similar to a tiebreak in tennis, and is designed "to prevent the team going second from having to play catch-up." Unlike a traditional penalty shoot-out, which sees Team A and Team B alternate spot-kicks in an ABAB pattern, the ABBA format follows an 'AB BA AB BA' order.

== Match ==
=== Details ===
7 January 2018
16:00 MST

Shan United	2 - 2	Yangon United
Patrick Asare 13', 68'	Report	Sylla Sekou 46', 65'
Penalties
Soe Min Oo (penalty scored); Patrick Asare (penalty scored); Lee Han-guk (penalty missed); Htike Htike Aung (penalty missed)	2–4	(penalty scored) Kekere Moukailou; (penalty scored) Emmanuel; (penalty missed) Kosuke Uchida; (penalty scored) Sylla Sekou; (penalty scored) Nyein Chan Aung

Bogyoke Aung San Stadium, Yangon
Attendance: 15,000
Referee: (Myanmar) Mr. Kyaw Zwal Lwin

Shan United	Yangon United

GK	1	(Myanmar) Thiha Sithu (c)
RB	3	(Myanmar) Htike Htike Aung
CB	2	(Myanmar) Win Min Htut	(yellow card) 81'
CB	27	(Cameroon) William
LB	5	(Myanmar) Hein Thiha Zaw	(yellow card) 36'
CM	17	(Myanmar) Aung Show Thar Maung	(yellow card) 26'	(substituted off) 54'
CM	6	(South Korea) Lee Han-guk
CM	11	(Myanmar) Yan Naing Oo		(substituted off) 53'
RW	77	(Myanmar) Dway Ko Ko Chit		(substituted off) 61'
LW	31	(Ghana) Patrick Asare
CF	30	(Nigeria) Christopher Chizoba		(substituted off) 81'
Substitutes:
GK	18	(Myanmar) Myo Min Latt
DF	2	(Myanmar) Zaw Lin Oo
MF	7	(Myanmar) Tin Win Aung		(substituted on) 54'
MF	8	(Myanmar) Nay Lin Tun		(substituted on) 53'
FW	9	(Myanmar) Zin Min Tun		(substituted on) 61'
FW	10	(Myanmar) Soe Min Oo		(substituted on) 81'
DF	12	(Myanmar) Hlaing Myo Aung
DF	13	(Myanmar) Zaw Lin
MF	19	(Myanmar) Shwe Ko
Manager:
(Myanmar) Mr. Soe Myat Min

GK	1	(Myanmar) Kyaw Zin Htet	(yellow card) 36'
RB	4	(Myanmar) David Htan
CB	44	(Ivory Coast) Kekere Moukailou
CB	3	(Myanmar) Pyae Phyo Zaw
LB	22	(Myanmar) Minn Kyaw Khant	(yellow card) 70'
CM	25	(Myanmar) Yan Aung Kyaw (c)	(yellow card) 82'	(substituted off) 82'
CM	20	(Japan) Kosuke Uchida
RW	11	(Myanmar) Maung Maung Lwin
LW	8	(Myanmar) Suan Lam Mang		(substituted off) 46'
SS	10	(Myanmar) Kyi Lin		(substituted off) 90+2'
CF	15	(Guinea) Sylla Sekou
Substitutes:
GK	13	(Myanmar) Min Thu
DF	5	(Myanmar) Thein Zaw
MF	6	(Myanmar) Yan Lin Aung		(substituted on) 82'
MF	7	(Myanmar) Nyein Chan Aung		(substituted on) 90+2'
DF	14	(Myanmar) Nan Wai Min
MF	18	(Myanmar) Zin Ko
DF	19	(Myanmar) Kyaw Zin Oo
FW	27	(Myanmar) Aee Soe
FW	88	(Nigeria) Emmanuel		(substituted on) 46'
Manager:
(Myanmar) Mr. Myo Min Tun

Man of the match

- (Guinea) Sekou Sylla

Match officials

- Assistant referees:
  - (Myanmar) Mr. Chit Moe Aye
  - (Myanmar) Mr. Hein Min Tun
- Fourth official: (Myanmar) Mr. Kyaw Zayar Aung
- Reserve official: (Myanmar) Mr. Tun Hla Aung
- Match Commissioner: (Myanmar) Mr. Tun Tun Aung

Match rules

- 90 minutes.
- Penalty shoot-out if scores still level.
- Nine named substitutes.
- Maximum of five substitutions.

=== Statistics ===
Statistic	Shan United	Yangon United
Goals scored	2	2
Possession	45%	55%
Shots on target	7	8
Shots off target	1	9
Corner kicks	1	7
Fouls	9	20
Offsides	1	3
Yellow cards	3	3
Red cards	0	0
