= 2017 Shan United FC season =

Shan United
2017 season
- Chairman: (Myanmar) U Khun Naung Myint Wai
- Manager: (Myanmar) Soe Myat Min
- Stadium: Taunggyi Stadium

Shan United Football Club (Burmese: ရွမ္းယူႏိုက္တက္ အသင်း, pronounced [kàɴbɔ́za̰]), known as Kanbawza FC until 2015, is a Burmese football club, based in Taunggyi, Myanmar. Their home stadium name is Taunggyi Stadium in Shan State.

== Sponsorship ==
Period	Sportswear	Sponsor
2017	Pro Sport	(Myanmar) KBZ Bank

== Club ==
=== Coaching staff ===
Position	Staff
Manager	(Myanmar) Soe Myat Min
Assistant Manager	(Myanmar) U Aung Tun Tun
Assistant Manager	(Myanmar) U Han Win Aung
Technical coach	(Myanmar) U San Win
Goalkeeper Coach	(Myanmar) U Aung Thet
Fitness Coach	(Thailand) Mr Jeret

Source: KBZ FC

=== Other information ===
CEO	(Myanmar) U Khun Naung Myint Wai
Manager	(Myanmar) U Khin Maung Tun
Ground (capacity and dimensions)	KBZ Stadium (4,500 / 103x67 metres)
Training Ground	Taunggyi Stadium

== Current squad ==
Note: Flags indicate national team as defined under FIFA eligibility rules; some limited exceptions apply. Players may hold more than one non-FIFA nationality.

No.	Pos.	Nation	Player
1	GK	(Myanmar) MYA	Thiha Sithu (captain)
2	DF	(Myanmar) MYA	Nay Win Aung
3	DF	(Myanmar) MYA	Htike Htike Aung
4	DF	(Myanmar) MYA	Win Min Htut
5	DF	(Myanmar) MYA	Hein Thiha Zaw
6	MF	(Myanmar) MYA	Tin Win Aung
7	MF	(Ivory Coast) CIV	Maximum
8	MF	(Myanmar) MYA	Nay Lin Tun
9	FW	(Myanmar) MYA	Zin Min Tun
10	FW	(Myanmar) MYA	Soe Min Oo
11	MF	(Myanmar) MYA	Yan Naing Oo
12	DF	(Myanmar) MYA	Hlaing Myo Aung
13	DF	(Myanmar) MYA	Zaw Lin
14	MF	(Myanmar) MYA	Nan Min Aung
16	FW	(South Korea) KOR	Han Kyung-in

No.	Pos.	Nation	Player
17	MF	(Myanmar) MYA	Aung Shoe Thar Maung
18	GK	(Myanmar) MYA	Myo Min Latt
19	FW	(Myanmar) MYA	Shwe Ko
20	MF	(Myanmar) MYA	Chit Su Moe
21	DF	(Myanmar) MYA	Phyo Paing Soe
22	MF	(Myanmar) MYA	Nay Zaw Htet
23	MF	(Myanmar) MYA	Zaw Lin Oo
24	DF	(Myanmar) MYA	Nay Ye Lin
25	GK	(Myanmar) MYA	Htet Lin Oo
26	FW	(Myanmar) MYA	Sai Zwe Sat
28	DF	(England) ENG	Patrick Kanyuka
30	FW	(Nigeria) NGA	Christopher Chizoba
77	FW	(Myanmar) MYA	Dway Ko Ko Chit
