= 2018 Shan United FC season =

Shan United
2018 season
- Owner: Mr. Khun Naung Myint Wai
- Chairman: Mr. Khun Naung Myint Wai
- Manager: Marjan Sekulovski
- Stadium: Taunggyi Stadium

The 2018 season is Shan United's 9th season in the Myanmar National League since 2009.

== Season Review ==
Period	Sportswear	Sponsor
2018	(Thailand) Pro//Sport	(Myanmar) KBZ Bank

== 2018 First team squad ==
Note: Flags indicate national team as defined under FIFA eligibility rules; some limited exceptions apply. Players may hold more than one non-FIFA nationality.

No.	Pos.	Nation	Player
1	GK	MYA	Thiha Sithu (captain)
2	DF	MYA	Zaw Lin Oo
3	DF	MYA	Htike Htike Aung
4	DF	MYA	Win Min Htut (vice captain)
5	DF	MYA	Hein Thiha Zaw
6	MF	KOR	Lee Han-kuk
7	MF	MYA	Tin Win Aung
8	MF	MYA	Nay Lin Tun
9	FW	MYA	Zin Min Tun
10	FW	MYA	Soe Min Oo
11	MF	MYA	Yan Naing Oo
12	DF	MYA	Hlaing Myo Aung
13	DF	MYA	Zaw Lin
14	MF	MYA	David Htan
15	DF	MYA	Ye Min Thu

No.	Pos.	Nation	Player
16	MF	MYA	Zwe Thet Paing
17	MF	MYA	Aung Shoe Thar Maung
18	GK	MYA	Myo Min Latt
19	FW	MYA	Shwe Ko
20	MF	MYA	Chit Su Moe
21	DF	MYA	Phyo Paing Soe
22	FW	MYA	Sa Aung Pyae Ko
23	DF	MYA	Hein Phyo Win
25	GK	MYA	Phone Thit Sar Min
27	DF	CMR	William Nyakwe
30	FW	NGA	Christopher Chizoba
77	FW	MYA	Dway Ko Ko Chit
99	FW	MYA	Suan Lam Mang

== Continental record ==
Season	Competition	Round	Club	Home	Away	Aggregate
2018	AFC Champions League	Qualifying Preliminary Round 2	(Philippines) Ceres–Negros	1–1(3–4)		
2018	AFC Cup	Group G	(Cambodia) Boeung Ket Angkor		1–2	
2018	AFC Cup	Group G	(Singapore) Home United	0–1	2–3	
2018	AFC Cup	Group G	(Philippines) Ceres–Negros	0–1	0–2	

== Transfer ==
=== In ===
- Lee Han-kuk - from (Thailand) Phrae United F.C.
- William Nyakwe - from Yadanarbon
- Patrick Asare - from Yadanarbon
- Phone Thit Sar Min - from Shan United Youth team

=== Out ===
- Soe Lwin Lwin - to Magwe
- Myat Tun Thit - to Magwe
- Nay Myo Aung - to Rakhine United

== Coaching staff ==
Position	Staff
Manager	(Myanmar) Mr. Aung Kyaw Tun
Assistant Manager	(Myanmar) Mr. Han Win Aung
Assistant Manager	(Myanmar) Mr. Aung Tun Tun
Technical Coach	(Myanmar)
Goalkeeper Coach	(Myanmar) Mr. Aung Thet
Fitness Coach	(Myanmar)

Source: KBZ FC

=== Other information ===
Owner	(Myanmar) Mr. Khun Naung Myint Wai
Chairman	(Myanmar) Mr. Moe San Aung
Ground (capacity and dimensions)	taunggyi (15,000 / 103x67 metres)
Training Ground	Taunggyi Stadium

Source: KBZ FC
