= 2016 Shan United FC season =

Shan United
2016 season
- Manager: (Myanmar) Soe Myat Min
- Stadium: Taunggyi Stadium
- Myanmar National League: 5th
- Top goalscorer: Soe Min Oo (9 Goals)

Shan United Football Club (Burmese: ရွမ္းယူႏိုက္တက္ အသင္း, pronounced [kàɴbɔ́za̰]) is a Burmese football club, based in Taunggyi, Myanmar. Their home stadium name is Taunggyi Stadium in Shan State. Former name is Kanbawza FC and name changed in 2015.

== Sponsorship ==
Period	Sportswear	Sponsor
2016	(Thailand) Grand Sport	(Sweden) Scania AB

== Club ==
=== Coaching staff ===
Position	Staff
Manager	(Myanmar) Soe Myat Min
Assistant Manager	(Myanmar) U Thein Tun Thein
Assistant Manager	(Myanmar) U Min Zaw Oo
Assistant Manager	(Myanmar) U Han Win Aung
Technical coach	
Goalkeeper Coach	(Myanmar) U Aung Thet
Fitness Coach	(Thailand) Mr Poket

Source: KBZ FC

=== Other information ===
CEO	(Myanmar) U Saw Lu Lu Htaw
Ground (capacity and dimensions)	KBZ Stadium (4,500 / 103x67 metres)
Training Ground	Taunggyi Stadium

=== First team squad ===
As of 20 January 2016.

Squad No.	Name	Nationality	Position(s)	Date of birth (age)
Goalkeepers
1	Myo Min Latt	(Myanmar)	GK	20 February 1995 (age 30)
29	Thiha Sithu	(Myanmar)	GK	10 February 1987 (age 38)
30	Htet Lin Oo	(Myanmar)	GK	
Defenders
3	Htike Htike Aung	(Myanmar)	CB	1 February 1995 (age 31)
4	Win Min Htut (captain)	(Myanmar)	CB	6 April 1986 (age 39)
5	Hein Thiha Zaw	(Myanmar)	LB	1 August 1995 (age 30)
6	Nay Win Aung	(Myanmar)	CB	
12	Hlaing Myo Aung	(Myanmar)	LB / LW	23 April 1996 (age 29)
13	Zaw Lin	(Myanmar)	RB / CB	
15	Zan Bo Tun	(Myanmar)	RB / LB	
20	Kaung Myat Han	(Myanmar)	RB	
24	Sithu Win	(Myanmar)	RB	
27	Patrick Kanyuka	(England)	CB	8 February 1986 (age 39)
Midfielders
7	Gustavo	(Brazil)	RW / LW / AM	7 February 1988 (age 37)
8	Nay Lin Tun	(Myanmar)	RW / LW	
14	Hla Aye Htwe	(Myanmar)	LW / AM	
19	Soe Kyaw Oo	(Myanmar)	RW	
21	Thiha Thu	(Myanmar)	RW	
22	Nay Zaw Htet	(Myanmar)	RW / LW	
23	Aih Fer	(Myanmar)	RW	
11	Yan Naing Oo	(Myanmar)	CM	31 March 1996 (age 29)
99	Maximum	(Ivory Coast)	AM	
Strikers
10	Soe Min Oo	(Myanmar)	CF	8 March 1988 (age 37)
16	Sai Min Tun	(Myanmar)	CF	7 July 1994 (age 31)
17	Mai Ai Naing	(Myanmar)	CF	
18	Zin Min Tun	(Myanmar)	CF	12 June 1993 (age 32)

== Transfers ==
In: Note: Flags indicate national team as defined under FIFA eligibility rules; some limited exceptions apply. Players may hold more than one non-FIFA nationality.

No.	Pos.	Nation	Player
1	GK	MYA	Thiha Sithu (from (Myanmar) Yadanarbon)
17	MF	MYA	Nay Lin Tun (from (Myanmar) Ayeyawady United)
15	DF	MYA	Hein Thiha Zaw (from (Myanmar) Ayeyawady United)
14	DF	MYA	Htike Htike Aung (from (Myanmar) Ayeyawady United)
—	MF	MYA	Hlaing Myo Aung (from (Myanmar) Zwekapin United)
28	FW	MYA	Zin Min Tun (from (Myanmar) Yadanarbon)

Out: Note: Flags indicate national team as defined under FIFA eligibility rules; some limited exceptions apply. Players may hold more than one non-FIFA nationality.

No.	Pos.	Nation	Player
5	DF	MYA	Nyana Lwin (contract end)
7	MF	MYA	Kyaw Zayar Win (contract end)
9	DF	MYA	Min Min Tun (contract end)
11	MF	MYA	Thein Than Win (to (Myanmar) Yadanarbon)
18	GK	MYA	Phyo Min Maung (contract end)
—	DF	MYA	Kaung Myat Kyaw (contract end)

== Half-season transfer ==
- Aly Camara = Cancel contract
- Behshad Yavarzadeh = Cancel contract
