= 2016 Kanbawza FC season =

Kanbawza FC
2016 season
- Owner: (Myanmar) Kanbawza Bank Ltd
- Manager: (Myanmar) Soe Myat Min
- Stadium: KBZ Stadium

Kanbawza Football Club (Burmese: ကမ္ဘောဇ အသင်း, pronounced [kàɴbɔ́za̰]) is a Burmese football club, based in Taunggyi, Myanmar. Their home stadium name is KBZ Stadium in Shan State.

== Sponsorship ==
Period	Sportswear	Sponsor
2016	(Thailand) FBT	(Myanmar) Air KBZ

== Club ==
=== Coaching staff ===
Position	Staff
Manager	(Myanmar) Soe Myat Min
Assistant Manager	(Myanmar) U Thein Tun Thein
Assistant Manager	(Myanmar) U Than Like
Assistant Manager	(Myanmar) U Aung Tun Tun
Assistant Manager	(Myanmar) U Hum Tun
Goalkeeper Coach	(Myanmar)
Fitness Coach	(Myanmar)

Source: KBZ FC

=== Other information ===
CEO	(Myanmar) U Moe San Aung
Ground (capacity and dimensions)	KBZ Stadium (4,500 / 103x67 metres)
Training Ground	KBZ Stadium

=== First team squad ===
As of 20 November 2016.

Squad No.	Name	Nationality	Position(s)	Date of Birth (Age)
Goalkeepers
1	Myo Min Latt	(Myanmar)	GK	20 February 1995 (age 30)
	Thiha Sithu	(Myanmar)	GK	
Defenders
4	Win Min Htut (captain)	(Myanmar)	CB	6 April 1986 (age 38)
6	Nay Lin Aung	(Myanmar)	CB	
17	Thein Naing Oo	(Myanmar)	CB	
23	Zan Bo Tun	(Myanmar)	RB / LB	
25	Zaw Lin	(Myanmar)	RB / CB	
	Hein Thiha Zaw	(Myanmar)	LB	
	Yan Aung Win	(Myanmar)	RB	
	Midfielders			
6	Nay Win Aung	(Myanmar)	RW	
14	Hla Aye Htwe	(Myanmar)	LW / AM	
21	Chit Hla Aung	(Myanmar)	RW	
22	Nay Zaw Htet	(Myanmar)	RW / LW	
	Nay Lin Tun	(Myanmar)	RW / LW	
	Hlaing Myo Aung	(Myanmar)	RW / LW	
Strikers
10	Soe Min Oo	(Myanmar)	CF	8 March 1988 (age 37)
	Sai Min Tun	(Myanmar)	CF	
	Mai Ai Naing	(Myanmar)	CF	
	Sithu Win	(Myanmar)	CF	

== Transfers ==
In: Note: Flags indicate national team as defined under FIFA eligibility rules; some limited exceptions apply. Players may hold more than one non-FIFA nationality.

No.	Pos.	Nation	Player
1	GK	(Myanmar) MYA	Thiha Sithu (from (Myanmar) Yadanarbon)
17	MF	(Myanmar) MYA	Nay Lin Tun (from (Myanmar) Ayeyawady United)
15	DF	(Myanmar) MYA	Hein Thiha Zaw (from (Myanmar) Ayeyawady United)
—	MF	(Myanmar) MYA	Hlaing Myo Aung (from (Myanmar) Zwekapin United)

Out: Note: Flags indicate national team as defined under FIFA eligibility rules; some limited exceptions apply. Players may hold more than one non-FIFA nationality.

No.	Pos.	Nation	Player
5	DF	(Myanmar) MYA	Nyana Lwin (contract end)
7	MF	(Myanmar) MYA	Kyaw Zayar Win (contract end)
9	DF	(Myanmar) MYA	Min Min Tun (contract end)
11	MF	(Myanmar) MYA	Thein Than Win (to (Myanmar) Yadanarbon)
18	GK	(Myanmar) MYA	Phyo Min Maung (contract end)
—	DF	(Myanmar) MYA	Kaung Myat Kyaw (contract end)
