= 2017 General Aung San Shield final =

- Event: General Aung San Shield
Shan United	Yangon United
2	1
- Date: 25 October 2017
- Venue: Bogyoke Aung San Stadium, Yangon
- Man of the Match: (Myanmar) Yan Naing Oo
- Referee: (Myanmar) Mr. Khin Maung Win
- Attendance: 10,000
- Weather: Sunny; 33 °C (91 °F)

The 2017 General Aung San Shield final is the 7th final of the MFF Cup. The General Aung San Shield winner will qualify to AFC Cup competition. The match was contested by Shan United and Yangon United at Bogyoke Aung San Stadium in Yangon. The match will play on 25 October 2017 and was the final match of the Bogyoke Aung San Cup.

== Background ==
It is Shan United's first time ever General Aung San Shield final.

Yangon United were playing a record 3rd MFF Cup final. They had previously lose against Magwe in 2017 General Aung San Shield final.

== Ticket allocation ==
Both Shan United and Yangon United received a ticket allocation of 10,000 for the game. Ticket price are 1,000 MMK(Normal Ticket) and 2,000MMK(Special Ticket).

== Route to the Final ==
=== Shan United ===
Round	Opposition	Score
2nd	City Stars	6-0
QF	Magwe	3-2
SF	Ayeyawady United	1-1/2-2 (h/a)
Key: (h) = Home venue; (a) = Away venue; (n) = Neutral venue.

Shan United, as a National League team, started their campaign in the second round. In it, they won at MNL-2 City Stars. At Thuwunna, Shan United won 6-0 with goals from Han Kyung-In's Hat-rick, two goal from Christopher Chizoba and Dway Ko Ko Chit. In the quarter-final, Shan United drew Myanmar National League Magwe. At Thuwunna Stadium, Shan United won 3-2 with Christopher Chizoba, Maximum and Dway Ko Ko Chit. In the semi-final, Shan United were drawn against Ayeyawady United. At Taunggyi Stadium, Shan United draw 1–1 with goals from Dway Ko Ko Chit. And Semi-final second leg at Ayar Stadium, They drew 2-2 and go to final with Away Goal. Shan United reached for the first time to 2017 General Aung San Shield Final.

=== Yangon United ===
Round	Opposition	Score
2nd	Myawady	3–0
QF	Hantharwady United	4-0
SF	Yadanarbon	1-0/0-0 (h/a)
Key: (h) = Home venue; (a) = Away venue; (n) = Neutral venue.

Yangon United also started in the second round where they were drawn against MNL-2 side Myawady FC. At Thuwunna Stadium, Yangon United won 3-0 with two goals from Kyaw Ko Ko and another goal form Pyae Phyo Zaw . In the quarter-final, they were drawn with MNL team Hantharwady United at Aung San Stadium. Yangon United won 4–0 with Hat-trick goals from Kyaw Ko Ko and one goal from Cezar. In the semi-final first leg, Yangon United were drawn against MNL big team Yadanarbon. At home, Yangon United won 1–0 with goals from Cezar. In the semi-final second leg, they drew 1–1 and passed to go to 3rd final.

== Match ==
=== Details ===
25 October 2017
15:00 MST

Shan United	2 - 1	Yangon United
Maximum 45'; Christopher Chizoba 55'		César 59'

Bogyoke Aung San Stadium, Yangon
Attendance: 10,000
Referee: (Myanmar) Mr. Khin Maung Win

Shan United	Yangon United

GK	1	(Myanmar) Thiha Sithu (c)
RB	3	(Myanmar) Htike Htike Aung
CB	4	(Myanmar) Win Min Htut
CB	28	(England) Patrick Kanyuka	(yellow card) 59'
LB	17	(Myanmar) Hein Thiha Zaw
CM	7	(Ivory Coast) Maximum
CM	6	(Myanmar) Tin Win Aung		(substituted off) 81'
RW	11	(Myanmar) Yan Naing Oo	(yellow card) 86'
LW	77	(Myanmar) Dway Ko Ko Chit
CF	30	(Nigeria) Christopher Chizoba	(yellow card) 55'	(substituted off) 92'
CF	9	(Myanmar) Zin Min Tun		(substituted off) 63'
Substitutes:
GK	18	(Myanmar) Myo Min Latt
DF	2	(Myanmar) Nay Win Aung
FW	10	(Myanmar) Soe Min Oo
DF	13	(Myanmar) Zaw Lin
FW	16	(South Korea) Han Kyung-In		(substituted on) 92'
MF	17	(Myanmar) Aung Show Thar Maung		(substituted on) 63'
MF	19	(Myanmar) Shwe Ko		(substituted on) 81'
Manager:
(Myanmar) Soe Myat Min

GK	1	(Myanmar) Kyaw Zin Htet
RB	14	(Myanmar) Nan Wai Min		(substituted off) 44'
CB	44	(Nigeria) Kekere Moukailou
CB	17	(Myanmar) Khin Maung Lwin (c)
LB	28	(Myanmar) Min Kyaw Khant		(substituted off) 73'
CM	20	(Brazil) Emerson
CM	25	(Myanmar) Yan Aung Kyaw		(substituted off) 57'
RM	4	(Myanmar) David Htan
LM	11	(Myanmar) Zon Moe Aung
CF	76	(Brazil) César
CF	10	(Myanmar) Kyaw Ko Ko
Substitutes:
GK	33	(Myanmar) Sann Satt Naing
DF	5	(Myanmar) Thein Zaw		(substituted on) 73'
MF	8	(Myanmar) Kyi Lin		(substituted on) 44'
MF	18	(Myanmar) Than Htet Aung
MF	19	(Myanmar) Yan Lin Aung	(yellow card) 69'	(substituted on) 57'
FW	30	(Myanmar) Soe Min Naing
DF	32	(Myanmar) Thiha Zaw
Manager:
(Myanmar) Myo Min Tun

Man of the match

- (Myanmar) Yan Naing Oo

Match officials

- Assistant referees:
- Fourth official:
- Reserve official:
- Match Commissioner:

Match rules

- 90 minutes.
- 30 minutes of extra-time if necessary.
- Penalty shoot-out if scores still level.
- Seven named substitutes.
- Maximum of three substitutions.

=== Statistics ===
Statistic	Shan United	Yangon United
Goals scored	2	2
Possession	46	54
Shots on target	4	4
Shots off target	3	3
Corner kicks	5	6
Fouls	10	8
Offsides	4	0
Yellow cards	3	1
Red cards	0	0

== Broadcasting rights ==
These matches will be broadcast live on Myanmar television:

Round	MWD & MWD Variety
Final	Shan united vs Yangon United
