= 2019 Shan United F.C. season =

Shan United
2019 season
- Owner: (Myanmar) Khun Nuang Myint Wai
- Manager: (Myanmar) Min Thu
- Stadium: Taunggyi Stadium

The 2019 season is Shan United's 10th season in the Myanmar National League since 2009.

== Season Review ==
| Period | Sportswear | Sponsor |
|---|---|---|
| 2019 | (Thailand) Pro Sport | (Myanmar) KBZ Bank |

== 2019 First team squad ==
Note: Flags indicate national team as defined under FIFA eligibility rules; some limited exceptions apply. Players may hold more than one non-FIFA nationality.

| No. | Pos. | Nation | Player |
|---|---|---|---|
| 1 | GK | MYA | Thiha Sithu (captain) |
| 2 | DF | MYA | Zaw Lin Oo |
| 3 | DF | MYA | Htike Htike Aung |
| 4 | DF | MYA | David Htan |
| 5 | DF | MYA | Hein Thiha Zaw |
| 6 | DF | MYA | Nanda Kyaw |
| 7 | MF | MYA | Tin Win Aung |
| 9 | FW | MYA | Zin Min Tun |
| 10 | FW | BRA | Maycon |
| 11 | MF | MYA | Yan Naing Oo |
| 12 | MF | MYA | Suan Lam Mang |
| 13 | GK | MYA | Myo Min Latt |
| 14 | MF | JPN | Reo Nakamura |
| 15 | DF | MYA | Ye Min Thu |
| 16 | MF | MYA | Zwe Thet Paing |

| No. | Pos. | Nation | Player |
|---|---|---|---|
| 17 | MF | MYA | Aung Shoe Thar Maung |
| 18 | GK | MYA | Phone Thit Sar Min |
| 19 | FW | MYA | Shwe Ko |
| 20 | DF | MYA | Myat Min Thu |
| 21 | MF | MYA | Pyae Sone Aung |
| 22 | FW | MYA | Sa Aung Pyae Ko |
| 23 | DF | MYA | Hein Phyo Win |
| 25 | MF | MYA | Thet Paing Htoo |
| 26 | MF | MYA | Set Phyo Wai |
| 33 | DF | BRA | Dedimar |
| 44 | DF | MYA | Ye Yint Tun |
| 61 | MF | MYA | Htet Phyo Wai |
| 70 | FW | BRA | Hédipo Gustavo |
| 77 | FW | MYA | Dway Ko Ko Chit |

== Transfer ==
=== Transfer In ===
Note: Flags indicate national team as defined under FIFA eligibility rules; some limited exceptions apply. Players may hold more than one non-FIFA nationality.

| No. | Pos. | Nation | Player |
|---|---|---|---|
| — | DF | MYA | Ye Yint Tun (transfer from (Myanmar) Yadanarbon) |
| — | MF | MYA | Pyae Sone Aung (transfer from (Myanmar) Sagaing United) |
| — | MF | MYA | Nanda Kyaw (transfer from (Myanmar) Magwe) |
| — | MF | MYA | Set Phyo Wai (transfer from (Myanmar) Magwe) |

=== Transfer Out ===
Note: Flags indicate national team as defined under FIFA eligibility rules; some limited exceptions apply. Players may hold more than one non-FIFA nationality.

| No. | Pos. | Nation | Player |
|---|---|---|---|
| — | MF | MYA | Chit Su Moe (transfer to) |
| — | MF | MYA | Naing Lin Tun (transfer to) |

== Coaching staff ==
| Position | Staff |
|---|---|
| Manager | (Myanmar) Min Thu |
| Assistant Manager | (Myanmar) Aung Kyaw Myo |
| Assistant Manager | (Myanmar) Han Win Aung |
| Technical Coach | (Myanmar) |
| Goalkeeper Coach | (Myanmar) Aung Thet |
| Fitness Coach | (Myanmar) |

Source: Shan United FC

=== Other information ===
| Owner | (Myanmar) Khun Naung Myint Wai |
| Chairman | (Myanmar) Khun Naung Myint Wai |
| Ground (capacity and dimensions) | Taunggyi Stadium (7,000 / 103x67 metres) |
| Training Ground | Taunggyi Stadium |

== Competition ==
=== Myanmar National League ===
| Pos | Team | Pld | W | D | L | GF | GA | GD | Pts | Qualification or relegation |
|---|---|---|---|---|---|---|---|---|---|---|
| 1 | Shan United (C) | 22 | 12 | 10 | 0 | 45 | 21 | +24 | 46 | Qualification for AFC Champions League preliminary round 1 (Note: If the league champions cannot qualify for the AFC Champions League group stage, they will enter the AFC Cup group stage.) |
| 2 | Ayeyawady United | 22 | 12 | 8 | 2 | 44 | 19 | +25 | 44 | |
| 3 | Yangon United | 22 | 12 | 7 | 3 | 40 | 15 | +25 | 43 | Qualification for AFC Cup play-off round (Note: Yangon United qualified for the AFC Cup play-off round as General Aung San Shield winners.) |
| 4 | Yadanarbon | 22 | 9 | 5 | 8 | 41 | 32 | +9 | 32 | |
| 5 | Hantharwady United | 22 | 9 | 5 | 8 | 28 | 27 | +1 | 32 | |

Source: MNL
Rules for classification: 1) Points; 2) Goal difference; 3) Goals scored.
(C) Champions
