= 2015 Kanbawza FC season =

Kanbawza FC
2015 season
- Owner: (Myanmar) Kanbawza Bank Ltd
- Manager: (Myanmar) Soe Myat Min
- Stadium: KBZ Stadium
- Myanmar National League: 5th
- Bogyoke Aung San Cup: loss in 3rd round
- Top goalscorer: Soe Min Oo (9 Goals)

Kanbawza Football Club (Burmese: ကမ္ဘောဇ အသင်း, pronounced [kàɴbɔ́za̰]) is a Burmese football club, based in Taunggyi, Myanmar. Based out of Yangon until 2009, the club was the Myanmar Premier League champions in 2007, and participated in the AFC President's Cup 2008 tournament. Kanbawza FC was a founding member of the Myanmar National League in 2009, and represents the Shan State. It finished fourth in the league's inaugural cup competition, the Myanmar National League Cup 2009.

== Sponsorship ==
Period	Sportswear	Sponsor
2015	(Thailand) FBT	(Myanmar) Air KBZ

== Club ==
=== Coaching staff ===
Position	Staff
Manager	(Myanmar) Soe Myat Min
Assistant Manager	(Myanmar) U Thein Tun Thein
Assistant Manager	(Myanmar) U Than Like
Assistant Manager	(Myanmar) U Aung Tun Tun
Assistant Manager	(Myanmar) U Hum Tun
Goalkeeper Coach	(Myanmar)
Fitness Coach	(Myanmar)

Source: KBZ FC

=== Other information ===
Owner	(Myanmar) U Khin Maung Kyaing
Ground (capacity and dimensions)	KBZ Stadium (4,500 / 103x67 metres)
Training Ground	KBZ Stadium

=== First team squad ===
As of 4 August 2015.

Squad No.	Name	Nationality	Position(s)	Date of birth (age)
Goalkeepers
1	Myo Min Latt	(Myanmar)	GK	20 February 1995 (age 30)
18	Phyo Min Maung	(Myanmar)	GK	
Defenders
4	Win Min Htut (captain)	(Myanmar)	CB	6 April 1986 (age 39)
5	Nyan Na Lwin	(Myanmar)	LB	
6	Nay Lin Aung	(Myanmar)	CB	
17	Thein Naing Oo	(Myanmar)	CB	
23	Zan Bo Tun	(Myanmar)	RB / LB	
25	Zaw Lin	(Myanmar)	LB	
26	Obadin Aikhena	(Nigeria)	CB	9 May 1986 (age 39)
	Midfielders			
6	Nay Win Aung	(Myanmar)	RW	
7	Kyaw Zayar Win (vice-captain)	(Myanmar)	CM / AM	2 May 1991 (age 34)
11	Thein Than Win	(Myanmar)	LW / LB	25 November 1991 (age 34)
14	Hla Aye Htwe	(Myanmar)	LW / AM	
17	Thein Naing Oo	(Myanmar)	CM / AM	
21	Chit Hla Aung	(Myanmar)	RW	
22	Nay Zaw Htet	(Myanmar)	RW / LW	
29	Mohamed Arif (Bakaa)	(Maldives)	CM	11 August 1985 (age 40)
Strikers
9	Min Min Tun	(Myanmar)	CF	
10	Soe Min Oo	(Myanmar)	CF	8 March 1988 (age 37)
27	Caleb Folan	(Republic of Ireland)	CF	26 October 1982 (age 43)
28	Giorgi Tsimakuridze	(Georgia (country))	CF	10 November 1983 (age 42)
