= 2017 Myanmar National League =

Myanmar National League
- Season: 2017
- Champions: Shan United
- Runner up: Yangon United
- Promoted: City Yangon; Mahar United F.C.
- Relegated: Chin United; Nay Pyi Taw
- Champions League: Shan United
- AFC Cup: Yangon United or Shan United
- Matches: 125
- Goals: 344 (2.75 per match)
- Top goalscorer: (Nigeria) Christopher Chizoba (Liberia) Keith Martu Nah (15 goals)
- Best goalkeeper: Thiha Sithu (14 Clean Sheets)
- Biggest home win: Yangon United 7 – 0 Chin United (29.10.2017)
- Biggest away win: Hanthawaddy United 0 – 3 Yangon United (25.2.2017)
- Highest scoring: Nay Pyi Taw F.C. 3 – 4 Hanthawaddy United (14.5.2017); Yadanarbon F.C. 4 – 3 Ayeyawady United F.C. (22.5.2017); Yangon United 7 – 0 Chin United (29.10.2017)
- Longest winning run: 11 matches Yangon United
- Longest unbeaten run: 13 matches Yangon United
- Longest winless run: 5 matches Hanthawaddy United
- Longest losing run: 5 matches Chin United

The 2017 Myanmar National League, also known as the 2017 Max Cement Myanmar National League, is the 8th season of the Myanmar National League, the top Burmese professional league for association football clubs since its founding in 2009. The nation's highest professional football league was shaken up at the end of the 2016 season following a series of surprise announcements by MNL-1 teams Zwegapin United and Zeyar Shwe Myay stating that they were going to drop out of the League in the next season. Also, Manaw Myay announced the team would be disbanded, despite winning promotion to Myanmar's premier domestic league by finishing the season's MNL-2 from the first place. A committee meeting between the Myanmar Football Federation and Myanmar National League officials held in Yangon on September 10 decided to reverse Southern Myanmar's relegation to MNL-2 in the next season, while Nay Pyi Taw received a surprise promotion into the first-tier league. Facing the loss of three squads and fears of scheduling complications for an 11-team league, MFF officials resolved to allow Southern Myanmar to remain in MNL-1, despite an 11th-place finish with only 14 points in the 2016 season. MNL-2 second-place finishers G.F.A, as well as third-place Nay Pyi Taw, were also promoted to the top league to maintain a 12-team schedule.

Although Zwegapin United initially signalled their intention to drop out of contention on August 22, team owner U Hla Htay later reversed his decision and announced that his team would continue to compete in the MNL-1, with preparations under progress for a home stadium in Hpa-An. In May 2017, Max Cement company sponsored 2017 MNL for second-half season.

== Teams ==
A total of 12 teams are competing in the 2017 season: 10 sides from the 2016 season and two promoted teams from the 2016 Myanmar National League 2.

=== Stadiums ===
Locations of the 2017 Myanmar National League

Club	Home City	Stadium	Capacity
Ayeyawady United	Pathein	Ayar Stadium	6,000
Chin United	Hakha	Wammathu Maung Stadium*	4,000
Hanthawaddy United	Bago	Grand Royal Stadium	4,000
Magwe	Magway	Magway Stadium*	3,000
Nay Pyi Taw	Nay Pyi Taw	Wunna Theikdi Stadium	30,000
Rakhine United	Sittwe	Weithali Stadium	7,000
Shan United	Taunggyi	Taunggyi Stadium	7,000
Southern Myanmar	Mawlamyaing	Ramanya Stadium	10,000
Yadanarbon	Mandalay	Mandalarthiri Stadium	30,000
Yangon United	Yangon	Yangon United Sports Complex	3,500
G.F.A	Chin		
Zwegapin United	Hpa-An	Aung Than Lwin Stadium	3,000

(*) – not ready to play. MNL clubs that have not had their home stadia ready to host home matches currently use Aung San Stadium and Thuwunna Stadium in Yangon.

=== Foreign players ===
The number of foreign players is restricted to four per MNL club. A team can use three foreign players on the field in each game, including a slot for a player from among AFC countries.

Club	Player 1	Player 2	Player 3	AFC player	Former Player
Ayeyawady United	(France) Sébastien Etiemble	(Liberia) Keith Martu Nah	(Cameroon) Ndongo Philippe		
Chin United	(Cameroon) Soulemadou	(Liberia) Sackie Teah Doe	(Cameroon) Ahmadou		(Cameroon) Kaham Mardochee (Ivory Coast) Arthur Kouassi
GFA	(Cameroon) Atanga Effa Kostka	(Ghana) Mark Sekyi	(Nigeria) Emmanuel Uzochukwu		
Hanthawaddy United	(Brazil) Junior	(Brazil) Marcinho	(Brazil) Marcio Santos		
Magwe	(Nigeria) Abdulafees Abdulsalam	(Mali) Jean-Paul Hinako Oulaï	(Nigeria) Michael Falcon		(Guinea) Sylla Sekou
Nay Pyi Taw	(Ivory Coast) Ibrahim	(Ivory Coast) Bamba Gaoussou	(Mali) Saliffii	(Japan) Nishihara Takumu	
Shan United	(Ivory Coast) Djawa Maximin	(England) Patrick Kanyuka	(Nigeria) Christopher Chizoba	(South Korea) Han Kyung-in	(South Korea) Kim Hyun-woo
Southern Myanmar	(Serbia) Mirko Todorović	(North Macedonia) Simeon Hristov	(Brazil) Hedipo Gustavo		(Brazil) Fernando Prado
Rakhine United	(Togo) Argarawa	(Nigeria) Anderson Ebimo West	(Nigeria) Idoku Sunday Mathew		
Yadanarbon	(Cameroon) Williams	(Ghana) Patrick Asare			
Yangon United	(Ivory Coast) Kekere Moukailou	(Brazil) Emerson	(Brazil) César		(Nigeria) Francis Emeka
Zwekapin United	(Brazil) Maranhão	(Nigeria) Clarke Clifford	(Ivory Coast) Moussa	(Japan) Ken Matsumoto	(Ivory Coast) Donald Bissa (Cameroon) Djam Ronald Kufoin

=== Personnel and sponsoring ===
Note: Flags indicate national team as has been defined under FIFA eligibility rules. Players may hold more than one non-FIFA nationality.

Team	Head coach	Captain	Kit manufacturer	Shirt sponsor
Ayeyawady United	(Myanmar) Htet Min Saya	(Myanmar) Min Min Thu	(Thailand) FBT	(Myanmar) AMI Insurance
Chin United	(Myanmar) Shwe Shwe Aung	(Myanmar) Suan Lam Mang	(Thailand) Pro Sport	(Thailand) M-150
G.F.A	(Myanmar) Htike Thiha Saya	(Myanmar) Mai Aih Naing	(Thailand) Kronos	(Myanmar) Gospel For Asia
Hanthawaddy United	(Myanmar) Saya Zaw Min Htut	(Myanmar) Aung Zaw	(Thailand) FBT	
Magwe	(Myanmar) Win Hlaing Oo	(Myanmar) Hein Zar Aung	(Thailand) Grand Sport	
Nay Pyi Taw	(Myanmar) Kyaw Zin Saya	(Myanmar) Chan Chan	(Thailand) Warrix Sports	(Myanmar) Hotel ACE
Rakhine United	(Myanmar) Phyo Thiha Naing	(Myanmar) Chan Nyein Kyaw		(Myanmar) United Amara Bank
Shan United	(Myanmar) Soe Myat Min	(Myanmar) Thiha Sithu	(Thailand) Pro Sport	(Myanmar) KBZ Bank
Southern Myanmar FC	(Myanmar) Win Min Htike	(Myanmar) Soe Myat Thu	(Thailand) Pro Sport	(Myanmar) Yuzana Group
Yadanarbon	(Myanmar) Aung Phyo Saya	(Myanmar) Yan Paing	(Thailand) FBT	(Myanmar) Alpine
Yangon United	(Myanmar) Ko Ko Oo	(Myanmar) Khin Maung Lwin	(Thailand) Grand Sport	(Myanmar) First National Insurance
Zwekapin United	(Myanmar) Saya Min Kyi Aung	(Myanmar) Latt Ko Ko Aye		(Myanmar) Htay Group

=== Managerial changes ===
Team	Outgoing manager	Manner of departure	Date of vacancy	Week	Table	Incoming manager	Date of appointment
Zwekapin United	(Myanmar) U Min Kyi	Resigned	29 April 2017	11	6th	(Myanmar) U Soe Moe	30 April 2017
Chin United	(Myanmar) U Min Tun Lynn	Sacked	1 May 2017	11	12th	(Myanmar) U Myint Swe	2 May 2017
Southern Myanmar	(Myanmar) U Mya Lwin	Sacked	9 May 2017	12	8th	(Portugal) Fabiano Jose Costa Flora	9 May 2017

== League table ==
Pos	Team	Pld	W	D	L	GF	GA	GD	Pts	Qualification or relegation
1	Shan United (C)	22	17	3	2	37	8	+29	54	AFC Champions League preliminary round 2 or AFC Cup group stage
2	Yangon United	22	16	4	2	45	11	+34	52	
3	Yadanarbon	22	14	5	3	50	27	+23	47	
4	Ayeyawady United	22	10	6	6	36	24	+12	36	
5	Rakhine United	22	9	7	6	25	25	0	34	
6	Magwe	22	7	9	6	25	23	+2	30	
7	Southern Myanmar United	22	5	8	9	19	24	−5	23	
8	Zwegapin United	22	8	2	12	20	32	−12	26	
9	Hanthawaddy United	22	5	8	9	30	37	−7	23	
10	Gospel for Asia	22	4	5	13	20	33	−13	17	
11	Chin United (R)	22	3	2	17	21	48	−27	11	Relegation to MNL-2
12	Nay Pyi Taw (R, B)	22	3	3	16	16	49	−33	12	Relegation to MNL-2

(B) Banned from 2017 Myanmar National League; (C) Champions; (R) Relegated

== Results ==
Home \ Away	AYA	CUD	GFA	HUD	MGW	NPT	RUD	SUD	SMU	YDB	YGN	ZKP
Ayeyawady United		2–0	1–0	2–2	0–0	4–0	1–2	1–2	2–2	1–2	1–1	2–1
Chin United	1–3		0–2	1–2	0–1	3–1	0–1	0–2	1–0	2–2	2–3	0–1
GFA	0–1	2–1		1–3	1–1	0–1	2–3	1–2	0–3	0–3	0–2	1–2
Hanthawaddy United	3–3	1–1	1–1		1–1	0–0	1–2	1–2	2–0	2–3	0–3	1–2
Magwe	0–2	2–1	1–2	1–1		2–1	1–1	0–2	1–1	0–1	2–1	4–0
Nay Pyi Taw	0–3	3–2	2–2	3–4	0–1		2–1	0–3	0–3	2–3	1–3	0–3
Rakhine United	1–2	3–1	0–4	0–0	0–0	3–0		0–3	0–0	3–3	0–0	1–0
Shan United	1–0	1–0	0–0	4–0	1–0	1–0	3–0		2–0	1–1	0–0	2–0
Southern Myanmar	0–2	2–1	0–0	4–2	0–0	0–0	1–2	0–2		2–1	0–0	1–1
Yadanarbon	4–3	6–1	2–0	3–2	2–2	3–0	1–1	2–3	1–0		3–0	1–0
Yangon United	2–0	7–0	2–0	1–0	5–0	3–0	1–0	1–0	2–0	2–1		4–0
Zwegabin United	0–0	1–3	2–1	0–1	0–5	2–0	0–1	1–0	3–0	0–2	1–2	

Updated to match(es) played on 29 October 2017. Source: MNL
Legend: Blue = home team win; Yellow = draw; Red = away team win.

== Matches ==
Fixtures and results of the Myanmar National League 2017 season.

=== Week 1 ===
2017-01-14	Rakhine United	0–0	Southern Myanmar	Wai Thar Li Stadium, Sittwe
16:00 UTC+06:30

2016-01-14	Shan United	1–0	Nay Pyi Taw	Taunggyi Stadium, Taunggyi
16:00 UTC+06:30	Patrick 8'

2016-01-14	Hanthawaddy United	1–2	Zwekapin United	Taungoo Stadium, Taungoo
16:00 UTC+06:30	Maung Maung Lwin 54'		Donald Bissa 79'; Djam 89'

2017-01-15	Yangon United	5–0	Magwe	Yangon United Sports Complex, Yangon
15:30 UTC+06:30	Zaw Min Tun 5'; Emeka 7', 83'; Emerson 43'; Kaung Sett Naing 68'

2017-01-15	Ayeyawady United	1–0	GFA	Kyaut Tie Stadium, Pathein
16:00 UTC+06:30	Keith Martu Nah 90+2'

2017-01-15	Chin United	2–2	Yadanarbon	Thuwunna Stadium, Yangon
16:00 UTC+06:30	Suan Lam Mang 5'; Bi Bi 71'		Aung Thu 19', 71'

=== Week 2 ===
2017-01-21	G.F.A	1–2	Shan United	Thuwunna Stadium, Yangon
16:00 UTC+06:30	Maung Maung Win 25'		Christopher Chizoba 62'; Soe Min Oo 75'

2016-01-21	Ayeyawady United	0–0	Magwe	Ayar Stadium, Pathein
16:00 UTC+06:30

2016-01-22	Hanthawaddy United	0–0	Nay Pyi Taw	Taungoo Stadium, Taungoo
16:00 UTC+06:30

2017-01-22	Yadanarbon	1–0	Zwekapin United	Mandalarthiri Stadium, Mandalay
15:30 UTC+06:30	Thet Naing 26'

2017-01-22	Chin United	1–0	Southern Myanmar	Aung San Stadium, Yangon
16:00 UTC+06:30	Suan Lam Mang 68'

2017-01-23	Rakhine United	0–0	Yangon United	Wai Thar Li Stadium, Sittwe
16:00 UTC+06:30

=== Week 3 ===
2017-01-27	Magwe	0–1	Yadanarbon	Thuwunna Stadium, Yangon
16:00 UTC+06:30			Win Naing Soe 34'

2017-01-28	Yangon United	2–0	Ayeyawady United	Yangon United Sports Complex, Yangon
16:00 UTC+06:30	Emeka 60', 70'

2017-01-28	Nay Pyi Taw	3–2	Chin United	Wunna Theikdi Stadium, Nay Pyi Taw
16:00 UTC+06:30	Diarra Zana Salif 39'; Takumu 57'; Yan Kha 62'		N'Gnan Koffi Desmos A K 40', 89'

2017-01-28	Zwekapin United	1–0	Shan United	Aung San, Yangon
16:00 UTC+06:30	Donald Bissa 65' (pen.)

2017-01-29	Rakhine United	0–0	Hanthawaddy United	Wai Thar Li Stadium, Sittwe
15:30 UTC+06:30

2017-01-28	Southern Myanmar	0–0	G.F.A	Yamanya Stadium, Mawlamyine
16:00 UTC+06:30

=== Week 4 ===
2017-02-04	Chin United	0–2	Shan United	Thuwunna Stadium, Yangon
16:00 UTC+06:30			Kim Heyon Woo 34'; Christopher 38'

2017-02-04	Hanthawaddy United	1–1	GFA	Taungoo Stadium, Taungoo
16:00 UTC+06:30	Yan Aung Win 88'		Emanuel 21'

2017-02-05	Ayeywady United	1–2	Yadanarbon	Ayar Stadium, Pathein
16:00 UTC+06:30	Keith Martu Nah 72' (pen.)		Myo Zaw Oo 8'; Myo Ko Tun 53'

2017-02-05	Yangon United	2–0	Southern Myanmar	Yangon United Sports Complex, Yangon
16:00 UTC+06:30	Zon Moe Aung 4'; Emeka 45+1'

2017-02-05	Rakhine United	1–0	Zwekapin United	Wai Thar Li Stadium, Sittwe
15:30 UTC+06:30	Sunday Mathew 44'

2017-02-05	Nay Pyi Taw	0–1	Magwe	Wunna Theikdi Stadium, Nay Pyi Taw
16:00 UTC+06:30			Naing Naing Kyaw 57'

=== Week 5 ===
2017-02-10	GFA	2–1	Chin United	Thuwunna Stadium, Yangon
16:00 UTC+06:30	Emenuel 37'; Win Min 66'		N'Gnan 28'

2017-02-10	Zwekapin United	0–0	Ayeyawady United	Thuwunna Stadium, Yangon
16:00 UTC+06:30

2017-02-11	Nay Pyi Taw	1–3	Yangon United	Wunna Theikdi Stadium, Nay Pyi Taw
16:00 UTC+06:30	Bamba 47'		Kyaw Ko Ko 12', 16'; Zaw Min Tun 77'

2017-02-11	Shan United	1–1	Yadanarbon	Thuwunna Stadium, Yangon
16:00 UTC+06:30	Christopher 49'		Win Naing Soe 37'

2017-02-11	Magwe	1–1	Rakhine United	Thuwunna Stadium, Yangon
16:00 UTC+06:30	Oulai 73' (pen.)		Hla Aye Htwe 62'

2017-02-12	Southern Myanmar	4–2	Hanthawaddy United	Mawlamyine Stadium
15:30 UTC+06:30	Simone 24', 86'; Soe Kyaw Thu 38'; Thet Paing Soe 90+3'		Chit Hla Aung 1'; Marcio Gomez 45+1'

=== Week 6 ===
2017-02-17	Yadanarbon	1–1	Rakhine United	Mandalarthiri Stadium, Mandalay
16:00 UTC+06:30	Yan Paing 9'		Sunday Mathew 54' (pen.)

2017-02-18	Shan United	1–0	Ayeyawady United	Taunggyi Stadium, Taunggyi
16:00 UTC+06:30	Christopher 44'

2017-02-18	Chin United	1–2	Hanthawaddy United	Aung San Stadium, Yangon
16:00 UTC+06:30	N'Gnan Koffi Desmos A K 65'		Aung Aung Oo 40'; Nyi Nyi Aung(2) 74'

2017-02-19	GFA	0–2	Yangon United	Thuwunna Stadium, Yangon
16:00 UTC+06:30			Emeka 47'; Zon Moe Aung 67'

2017-02-20	Zwekapin United	2–0	Nay Pyi Taw	Aung San Stadium, Yangon
16:00 UTC+06:30	Donald Bissa 14'; Kyaw Swar Lin 87'

2017-03-20	Southern Myanmar	0–0	Magwe	Mawlamyine Stadium, Mawlamyine
15:30 UTC+06:30

=== Week 7 ===
2017-02-25	Shan United	3–0	Rakhine United	Taunggyi Stadium, Taunggyi
15:30 UTC+06:30	Christopher 15'; Htike Htike Aung 70'; Maximum 88' (pen.)

2017-02-25	Hanthawaddy United	0–3	Yangon United	Taungoo Stadium, Taungoo
15:30 UTC+06:30			Moukailou 17'; Emeka 55', 85'

2017-02-26	Ayeyawady United	4–0	Nay Pyi Taw	Ayar Stadium, Pathein
15:30 UTC+06:30	Naing Lin Oo 45+3'; Sebestian 64'; Thiha Zaw 78', 90+2'

2017-02-26	Chin United	0–1	Magwe	Aung San Stadium, Yangon
16:00 UTC+06:30			Maung Maung Soe 39'

2017-02-26	Yadanarbon	1–0	Southern Myanmar	Mandalar Thiri Stadium, Mandalay
16:00 UTC+06:30	Win Naing Soe 31'

2017-02-26	GFA	1–2	Zwekapin United	Thuwunna Stadium, Yangon
16:00 UTC+06:30	Mai Aih Naing 36'		Donald Bissa 24'; Djam 85'

=== Week 8 ===
2017-03-04	Yangon United	1–0	Shan United	YUSC Stadium, Yangon
15:30 UTC+06:30	Kyaw Ko Ko 90+2'

2017-03-04	Nay Pyi Taw	2–1	Rakhine United	Wunna Theikdi Stadium, Nay Pyi Taw
15:30 UTC+06:30	Bamba 35'; Aung Myat Thu 61'		Sunday Mathew 3'

2017-03-04	Magwe	1–1	Hanthawaddy United	Thuwunna Stadium, Yangon
15:30 UTC+06:30	Aung Soe Moe 84'		Pyae Moe 87'

2017-03-04	Zwekapin United	1–3	Chin United	Aung San Stadium, Yangon
16:00 UTC+06:30	Donal Bissa 64'		Kaham Seuntcha 19'; Aung Moe 48', 90+3'

2017-03-04	Yadanarbon	2–0	GFA	Mandalar Thiri Stadium, Mandalay
16:00 UTC+06:30	Kostka 44' (o.g); Aung Thu 75'

2017-03-05	Southern Myanmar	0–2	Ayeyawady United	Ramanya Stadium, Mawlamyine
16:00 UTC+06:30			Ndongo Philippe 55'; Keith Martu Nah 58'

=== Week 9 ===
2017-03-10	Magwe	0–2	Shan United	Thuwunna Stadium, Yangon
15:30 UTC+06:30			Christopher 12'; Yan Naing Oo 45+2'

2017-03-11	Southern Myanmar	0–0	Nay Pyi Taw	Mawlamyine Stadium, Mawlamyine
15:30 UTC+06:30

2017-03-11	Ayeyawady United	2–0	Chin United	Ayar Stadium, Pathein
15:30 UTC+06:30	Thiha Zaw 43'; Sebestian 73'

2017-03-11	GFA	2–3	Rakhine United	Aung San Stadium, Yangon
16:00 UTC+06:30	Mai Aih Naing 4'; Mark Sekyi 32'		Sunday Mathew 15', 34'; Kaung Myat Han 90+2'

2017-03-12	Zwekapin United	1–2	Yangon United	Mandalar Thiri Stadium, Mandalay
16:00 UTC+06:30	Khine Htoo 57'		Emerson 11'; Emeka 45+1'

2017-03-14	Yadanarbon	3–2	Hanthawaddy United	Mandalar Thiri Stadium, Mandalay
16:00 UTC+06:30	Thet Naing 36'; Yan Paing 43'; Aung Thu 83'		Marcio Gomez 10', 85'

=== Week 10 ===
2017-04-01	Yangon United	2–1	Yadanarbon	Yangon United Sports Complex, Yangon
15:30 UTC+06:30	Soe Min Naing 74'; Zaw Min Tun 90+4'		Sithu Aung 45'

2017-04-01	Shan United	2–0	Southern Myanmar	Taunggyi Stadium, Taunggyi
16:00 UTC+06:30	Zin Min Tun 49'; Christopher 82'

2017-04-01	Magwe	4–0	Zwekapin United	Thuwunna Stadium, Yangon
16:00 UTC+06:30	Kyaw Swar Lin 28'; Maung Maung Soe 43', 75'; Htoo Htoo Aung 88'

2017-04-01	Nay Pyi Taw	2–2	GFA	Wunna Theikdi Stadium, Nay Pyi Taw
16:00 UTC+06:30	Bamba 26'; Soe Kyaw Oo 53'		Emmenuel 16'; Maung Maung Win 72'

2017-04-02	Rakhine United	3–1	Chin United	Waitharli Stadium, Sittwe
16:00 UTC+06:30	Idoko Sunday 45+1', 70'; Dway Ko Ko Chit 45+2'		Suan Lam Mang 34'

2017-04-02	Hanthawaddy United	3–3	Ayeyawady United	Taungoo Stadium, Taungoo
16:00 UTC+06:30	Pyae Moe; Nyi Nyi Aung 44'; Htoo Nay Aung 90+6'		Thiha Zaw 17'; Keith Martu Nah 25', 69'

=== Week 11 ===
2017-04-07	Rakhine United	1–2	Ayeyawady United	Wai Thar Li Stadium
16:00 UTC+06:30	Dway Ko Ko Chit 38'		Keith Martu Nah 82', 90+2'

2017-04-07	Hanthawaddy United	1–2	Shan United	Taunggoo Stadium, Taungoo
16:00 UTC+06:30	Pyae Moe 34'		Kim Hyeon Woo 6'; Christopher 25' (pen.)

2017-04-08	Southern Myanmar	1–1	Zwekapin United	Mawlamyine Stadium, Mawlamyine
16:00 UTC+06:30	Simeon 90+4'		Donald Bissa 58'

2017-04-08	Chin United	2–3	Yangon United	Aung San Stadium, Yangon
16:00 UTC+06:30	N'gnan Koffi 34' (pen.); Bi Bi 68'		Kyaw Ko Ko 12', 60'; EMeka 20'

2017-04-08	Magwe	1–2	GFA	Thuwunna Stadium
16:00 UTC+06:30	Cho Tun 85'		Mark 45+1'; Uzochukwu 62'

2017-04-08	Magwe	1–2	GFA	Thuwunna Stadium
16:00 UTC+06:30	Cho Tun 85'		Mark 45+1'; Uzochukwu 62'

=== Week 12 ===
2017-05-06	Shan United	2–0	Zwekapin United	Taunggyi Stadium, Shan
16:00 UTC+06:30	Yan Naing Oo 32'; Zin Min Tun 35'

2017-05-06	GFA	0–3	Southern Myanmar	Aung San Stadium, Yangon
16:00 UTC+06:30			Gustavo 6', 66'; Win Htay Kyaw 49'

2017-05-07	Chin United	3–1	Nay Pyi Taw	Thuwunna Stadium, Yangon
16:00 UTC+06:30	Suan Lam Mang 49'; N'gnan 56' (pen.); Bi Bi 70'		Takumu 78' (pen.)

2017-05-07	Ayeyawady United	1–1	Yangon United	Ayar Stadium, Pathein
16:00 UTC+06:30	Keith Martu Nah 43'

2017-05-07	Hanthawaddy United	1–2	Rakhine United	Taungoo Stadium, Bago
16:00 UTC+06:30	Nyi Nyi Aung2 14'		Dway Ko Ko Chit 40'; Sunday Mathew 57'

2017-05-08	Yadanarbon	2–2	Magwe	Mandalar Thiri Stadium, Mandalay
16:00 UTC+06:30	Aung Thu 17'; Win Naing Soe 67'		Kyaw Zin Lwin 11'; Ko Ko Naing 38'

=== Week 13 ===
2017-05-13	Shan United	0–0	GFA	Taunggyi Stadium, Shan
15:30 UTC+06:30

2017-05-14	Southern Myanmar	2–1	Chin United	Mawlamyine Stadium, Mawlamyine
16:00 UTC+06:30	Simeon Hristov 11'; Mirko Todorovic 90+3'		Mardochee 90+2'

2017-05-14	Magwe	0–2	Ayeyawady United	Thuwunna Stadium, Yangon
16:00 UTC+06:30			Keith Martu Nah 37'; Sébastien Etiemble 75'

2017-05-14	Nay Pyi Taw	3–4	Hanthawaddy United	Wunnatheikdi Stadium, Nay Pyi Taw
16:00 UTC+06:30	Bamba 18', 62'; Yan Kha 39'		Chit Hla Aung 6'; Marcio Gomes 13', 21', 24'

2017-05-14	Yangon United	1–0	Rakhine United	YUSC Stadium, Yangon
15:30 UTC+06:30	Emerson Reis Luiz 52'

2017-05-14	Zwekapin United	0–2	Yadanarbon	Aung San Stadium, Yangon
16:00 UTC+06:30			Yan Paing 45+1'; Hlaing Bo Bo 48'

=== Week 14 ===
2017-05-20	GFA	1–3	Hanthawaddy United	Aung San Stadium, Yangon
16:00 UTC+06:30	Soe Min Aung 46'		Pyae Moe 12'; Maung Maung Lwin 42'; Mercio Gomes 82'

2017-05-21	Southern Myanmar	0–0	Yangon United	Mawlamyine Stadium, Mawlamyine
16:00 UTC+06:30

2017-05-21	Shan United	1–0	Chin United	Taunggyi Stadium, Shan
15:30 UTC+06:30	Dway Ko Ko Chit 14'

2017-05-21	Magwe	2–1	Nay Pyi Taw	Thuwunna Stadium, Yangon
16:00 UTC+06:30	Kyaw Swar Lin 12'; Naing Naing Kyaw 17'		Bamba 90+2'

2017-05-22	Yadanarbon	4–3	Ayeyawady United	Madalar Thiri Stadium, Mandalay
16:00 UTC+06:30	Partick Asare 38'; Thet Naing 64', 87'; Win Naing Soe 72'		Min Min Thu 23'; Sebestian 90+2'; Keith Martu Nah 90+4'

2017-05-22	Zwekapin United	0–1	Rakhine UNited	Aung San Stadium, Yangon
16:00 UTC+06:30			Aung Kyaw Htwe 89'

=== Week 15 ===
2017-05-27	Yadanarbon	3–0	Yangon United	Mandalarthiri Stadium, Mandalay
16:00 UTC+06:30	Aung Thu 25'; Myo Ko Tun 64'; Patrick Asare 71'

2017-05-27	Ayeyawady United	2–2	Hatharwady United	Ayar Stadium, Pathein
16:00 UTC+06:30	Keith Martu Nah 28'; Sebestian 62'		Maung Maung Lwin 75'; Aung Myo Thura 84'

2017-05-27	Southern Myanmar	0–2	Shan United	Mawlamyine Stadium, Mawlamyine
15:30 UTC+06:30			Maximum 46'; Christopher Chizoba 90+1'

2017-05-27	Zwekapin United	0–5	Magwe	Aung San Stadium, Yangon
16:00 UTC+06:30			Abdulsalam 14'; Oulai 52'; Zin Min Tun 62', 90'; Set Phyo Wai 70'

2017-05-27	GFA	0–1	Nay Pyi Taw	Thuwunna Stadium, Yangon
16:00 UTC+06:30			Yan Kha 70'

2017-05-28	Chin United	0–1	Rakhine United	Aung San Stadium, Yangon
16:00 UTC+06:30			Nyein Tayzar Win 10'

=== Week 16 ===
2017-06-01	GFA	0–1	Ayeyawady United	Aung San Stadium, Yangon
16:00 UTC+06:30			Aung Myint Tun 69'

2017-06-01	Magwe	2–1	Yangon United	Thuwunna Stadium, Yangon
16:00 UTC+06:30	Adusalam 56'; Kyaw Swar Lin 58'		Moukailou 84'

2017-06-01	Yadanarbon	6–1	Chin United	Mandalar Thiri Stadium, Mandalay
15:30 UTC+06:30	Sithu Aung 16'; Thet Naing 24'; Myo Ko Tun 80'; Patrick 83', 90', 90+3'		Ahmdou 28'

2017-06-02	Zwekapin United	0–1	Hanthawaddy United	Aung San Stadium, Yangon
16:00 UTC+06:30			Nyi Nyi Aung 2 90+4'

2017-06-02	Nay Pyi Taw	0–3	Shan United	Thuwunna Stadium, Yangon
16:00 UTC+06:30			Dway Ko Ko Chit 14'; Chit Su Moe 50'; Christopher 83'

2017-06-03	Southern Myanmar	1–2	Rakhine United	Maw Lamyine Stadium, Maw Lamyine
16:00 UTC+06:30	Simone 74'		Anderson West 87'; Zaw Lin 90'

=== Week 17 ===
2017-09-09	Rakhine United	3–3	Yadanarbon	YUSC Stadium, Yangon
16:00 UTC+06:30	Zaw Zaw Naing 23'; Sunday Mathew 69'; Aung Kyaw Htwe 76'		Patrick Asre 6'; Ye Yint Tun 21'; Win Naing Soe 27'

2017-09-09	Hanthawaddy United	1–1	Chin United	Grand Royal Stadium, Bago
16:00 UTC+06:30	Paing Moe Wai 9'		Bi Bi 20'

2017-09-09	Nay Pyi Taw	0–3	Zwekapin United	Wunna Theikdi Stadium, Nay Pyi Taw
15:30 UTC+06:30		Nay Pyi Taw cancel match

2017-09-10	Yangon United	2–0	G.F.A	YUSC Stadium, Yangon
16:00 UTC+06:30	César 57', 84'

2017-09-10	Ayeyawady United	1–2	Shan United	Ayar Stadium, Pathein
16:00 UTC+06:30	Thiha Zaw 86'		Chiristopher Chizoba 31'; Dway Ko Ko Chit 79'

2017-09-11	Magwe	1–1	Southern Myanmar	YUSC Stadium, Yangon
16:00 UTC+06:30	Adulsalam 44'		Simeon Histov 81'

=== Week 18 ===
2017-09-16	Rakhine United	0–3	Shan United	YUSC Stadium, Yangon
16:00 UTC+06:30			Christopher 24', 38'; Han Kyung-In 65'

2017-09-16	Southern Myanmar	2–1	Yadanarbon	Grand Royal Stadium, Bago
16:00 UTC+06:30	Aung Hein Soe Oo 48'; Kaung Sithu 68'		Myo Zaw Oo 73'

2017-09-16	Magwe	2–1	Chin United	Aung San Stadium, Yangon
16:00 UTC+06:30	Cho Tun 50'; Adulafees 67'		Aung Thu Soe 90+2'

2017-09-17	Yangon United	1–0	Hanthawaddy United	YUSC Stadium, Yangon
15:30 UTC+06:30	Emerson 38' (pen.)

2017-09-17	Ayeyawady United	3–0	Nay Pyi Taw	Aung San Stadium, Yangon
15:30 UTC+06:30

2017-09-18	Zwekapin United	2–1	G.F.A	Aung San Stadium, Yangon
16:00 UTC+06:30	Yan Kyaw Htwe 21'; Carlos Martins 34'		Soe Min Aung 27'

=== Week 19 ===
2017-09-24	Shan United	0–0	Yangon United	Taunggyi stadium, Taunggyi
15:30 UTC+06:30

2017-09-24	Chin United	0–1	Zwekapin United	Aung San Stadium, Yangon
16:00 UTC+06:30			Ken 63'

2017-09-25	GFA	0–3	Yadanarbon	Aung San Stadium, Yangon
16:00 UTC+06:30				Attendance: GFA did not came to match

2017-09-25	Ayeyawady United	2–2	Southern Myanmar	Ayar Stadium, Pathein
15:30 UTC+06:30	Min Min Thu 40'; Keith Martu Nah 90' (pen.)		Gustavo 77'; Yan Naing Htwe 86'

2017-09-25	Hanthawaddy United	1–1	Magwe	Aung San Stadium, Yangon
15:30 UTC+06:30	Marcio Gomez 29'		Abdusalam 63'

Auto Win	Nay Pyi Taw	0–3	Rakhine United
16:00 UTC+06:30

=== Week 20 ===
2017-10-14	Shan United	1–0	Magwe	Taunggyi stadium, Taunggyi
15:30 UTC+06:30	Patrick 16'

2017-10-14	Chin United	1–3	Ayeyawady United	Thuwunna Stadium, Yangon
16:00 UTC+06:30	Than Paing 44'		Keith Martu Nah 20', 85'; Thiha Zaw 37'

2017-10-14	Rakhine United	0–4	GFA	Aung San Stadium, Yangon
16:00 UTC+06:30			Emmanuel 38', 40', 71'; Effa Kostka 65'

2017-10-14	Hantharawady United	2–3	Yadanarbon	Grand Royal Stadium, Bago
15:30 UTC+06:30	Marcio Gomez 58'; Mercinho 90+4'		Patrick 68' (pen.), 79', 90+5'

2017-10-15	Yangon United	4–0	Zwekapin United	YUSC Stadium, Yangon
15:30 UTC+06:30	Khin Maung Lwin 34'; César 66'; David Htan 84'; Emerson 87'

Auto Win	Nay Pyi Taw	0–3	Southern Myanmar
16:00 UTC+06:30

=== Week 21 ===
2017-10-21	Chin United	0–2	GFA	Thuwunna Stadium, Yangon
16:00 UTC+06:30			Emmanuel 34', 70'

2017-10-22	Yadanarbon	2–3	Shan United	Mandalarthiri Stadium, Mandalay
16:00 UTC+06:30	Patrick 55'; Myo Zaw Oo 90'		Dway Ko Ko Chit 17'; Soe Min Oo 61'; Christopher Chizoba 84'

2017-10-22	Ayeyawady United	2–1	Zwekapin United	Ayar Stadium, Pathein
15:30 UTC+06:30	Arkar Naing 51'; THiha Zaw 69'		Kyaw Htoo 35'

2017-10-22	Hantharawady United	2–0	Southern Myanmar	Grand Royal Stadium, Bago
15:30 UTC+06:30	Marcio Gomez 58'; Maung Maung Lwin 76'

2017-10-22	Rakhine United	0–0	Magwe	Aung San Stadium, Yangon
15:30 UTC+06:30

Auto Win	Nay Pyi Taw	0–3	Yangon United
16:00 UTC+06:30

=== Week 22 ===
2017-10-29	Yangon United	7–0	Chin United	YUSC Stadium, Yangon
15:00 UTC+06:30	Kyaw Ko Ko 6'; César 9', 43', 84'; Emerson 50'; Moukailou 63'; Soe Min Naing 74'

2017-10-29	Shan United	4–0	Hanthawaddy United	Taunggyi Stadium, Taunggyi
15:00 UTC+06:30	Zin Min Tun; Soe Min Oo; Christopher Chizoba

2017-10-29	G.F.A	1–1	Magwe	Aung San Stadium, Yangon
15:00 UTC+06:30	Pyone Cho 77'		Zin Min Tun 68'

2017-10-29	Ayeyawady United	1–2	Rakhine United	Ayar Stadium, Pathein
15:30 UTC+06:30	Keith Martu Nah 43'		Sunday Mathew 40', 47'

2017-10-29	Zwekapin United	3–0	Southern Myanmar	Thuwunna Stadium, Yangon
16:00 UTC+06:30	Yan Kyaw Htwe 61', 75'; Kyaw Swar Lin 67'

Auto Win	Yadanarbon	3–0	Nay Pyi Taw
16:00 UTC+06:30

== Season statistics ==
=== Top scorers ===
As of 29 October 2017.

Rank	Player	Club	Goals
1	(Liberia) Keith Martu Nah	Ayeyawady United	15
1	(Nigeria) Christopher Chizoba	Shan United	15
3	(Nigeria) Sunday Mathew	Rakhine United	11
4	(Brazil) Marcio Gomes	Hanthawaddy United	10
4	(Ghana) Patrick Asare	Yadanarbon	10
4	(Nigeria) Emmanuel	GFA	10
4	(Nigeria) Francis Emeka	Yangon United	10
8	(Myanmar) Dway Ko Ko Chit	Shan United	7
8	(Myanmar) Thiha Zaw	Ayeyawady United	7
10	(Ivory Coast) Bamba Gaoussou	Nay Pyi Taw	6
10	(Myanmar) Aung Thu	Yadanarbon	6
10	(Myanmar) Thet Naing	Yadanarbon	6
10	(Myanmar) Win Naing Soe	Yadanarbon	6
10	(North Macedonia) Simeon Hristov	Southern Myanmar	6
10	(Myanmar) Kyaw Ko Ko	Yangon United	6
10	(Brazil) César	Yangon United	6
15	(Myanmar) Suan Lam Mang	Chin United	4

=== Hat-tricks ===
Player	For	Against	Result	Date
Marcio Gomes	Hanthawaddy United	Nay Pyi Taw	4–3	14 May 2017
Patrick Asare	Yadanarbon	Chin United	6–1	2 June 2017
Patrick Asare	Yadanarbon	Hanthawaddy United	2–3	14 October 2017

=== Clean sheets ===
As of 12 September 2017.

Rank	Player	Club	Clean sheets
1	(Myanmar) Thiha Sithu	Shan United	14
2	(Myanmar) Kyaw Zin Htet	Yangon United	12
3	(Myanmar) Van Lal Hruaia	Ayeyawady United	8
4	(Myanmar) Kyaw Zin Phyo	Magwe	7
5	(Myanmar) Chan Nyein Kyaw	Rakhine United	6

== Awards ==
=== Monthly awards ===
Month	Coach of the Month		Player of the Month		Reference
Month	Coach	Club	Player	Club	Reference
January	(Myanmar) U Tin Maung Tun	Yangon United	(Nigeria) Francis Emeka	Yangon United	
February	(Myanmar) U Soe Myat Min	Shan United	(Nigeria) Christopher Chizoba	Shan United	
March & April	(Myanmar) U Tin Maung Tun	Yangon United	(Myanmar) Kyaw Ko Ko	Yangon United	
May	(Myanmar) U Soe Myat Min	Shan United	(Myanmar) Thet Naing	Yadanarbon	

== Attendances ==
Rank	Club	Average
1	Yadanarbon FC	800
2	Yangon United	700
3	Shan United	518
4	Southern Myanmar FC	418
5	Chin United	382
6	Ayeyawady United	359
7	Zwekapin United	336
8	Rakhine United	350
9	Magwe FC	318
10	Hantharwady United	305
11	Nay Pyi Taw FC	375
12	Gospel For Asia	270

== See also ==
- 2017 MNL-2
- 2017 General Aung San Shield
- 2017 MFF Charity Cup
- 2016–17 Myanmar Women League
