= 2016 Ayeyawady United F.C. season =

Ayeyawady United
2016 season
- Owner: (Myanmar) U Zaw Win Shein
- Manager: (Myanmar) U Kyaw Lwin
- Stadium: Ayar Stadium
- Top goalscorer: Christopher (16 goals)

== Sponsorship ==
Period	Sportswear	Sponsor
2016	(Thailand) FBT	

== Club ==
=== Coaching staff ===
Position	Staff
Manager	
Assistant Manager	(Myanmar) U Myo Win
Assistant Manager	(Myanmar)
Assistant Manager	(Myanmar)
Assistant Manager	(Myanmar)
Goalkeeper Coach	(Myanmar)
Fitness Coach	(Myanmar)

Source: Ayeyawady United FC

=== Other information ===
Owner	(Myanmar) Zaw Win Shein
Ground (capacity and dimensions)	Ayar Stadium (3,000 / 103x67 metres)
Training Ground	Ayar Stadium

=== First-team squad ===
As of 1 January 2016.

Squad No.	Name	Nationality	Position(s)	Date of birth (age)
Goalkeepers
1	Vanlal Hruala	(Myanmar)	GK	25 May 1991 (age 34)
18	Tun Lin Soe	(Myanmar)	GK	15 April 1983 (age 42)
25	Aung Min Khant	(Myanmar)	GK	2 May 1992 (age 33)
Defenders
2	San Myo Oo	(Myanmar)	RB	9 September 1986 (age 39)
3	Moe Win (vice-captain)	(Myanmar)	CB / DM	29 March 1985 (age 40)
5	Thein Naing Oo	(Myanmar)	CB	1 January 1994 (age 32)
6	Arkar Naing	(Myanmar)	LB	4 May 1993 (age 32)
12	Thet Lwin Win	(Myanmar)	RB / LB	2 December 1993 (age 32)
15	Wai Phyo	(Myanmar)	CB	12 August 1988 (age 37)
16	Aung Hein Kyaw	(Myanmar)	CB	19 July 1991 (age 34)
20	Phyo Ko Ko Thein	(Myanmar)	CB	24 January 1993 (age 33)
21	Naing Lin Tun	(Myanmar)	CB	3 March 1993 (age 32)
26	Hanson Samuel	(Ghana)	CB	5 February 1984 (age 41)
Midfielders
4	Naing Lin Oo	(Myanmar)	CM / DM	15 January 1986 (age 40)
7	Min Min Thu (captain)	(Myanmar)	CM / AM	30 March 1988 (age 37)
8	Aye Ko Ko Maung	(Myanmar)	CM	9 May 1988 (age 37)
9	Kyaw Zayar Win	(Myanmar)	AM	2 May 1991 (age 34)
10	Thiha Zaw	(Myanmar)	RW / LW	28 December 1993 (age 32)
11	Yan Pai Soe	(Myanmar)	AM / RW	14 February 1994 (age 31)
14	Chit Thet Oo	(Myanmar)	AM	10 May 1993 (age 32)
17	Nay Moe Naing	(Myanmar)	AM	13 December 1997 (age 28)
19	Aung Kyaw Naing	(Myanmar)	RW / LW / CF	20 December 1994 (age 31)
22	Soe Min Aung	(Myanmar)	AM	12 June 1989 (age 36)
23	Aung Ye Htut	(Myanmar)	RW	10 March 1985 (age 40)
24	Yakubu Abubakar	(Ghana)	CM	9 February 1990 (age 35)
28	Zin Myo Aung	(Myanmar)	CM	11 February 1990 (age 35)
Strikers
13	Sa Htet Naing Win	(Myanmar)	CF	5 May 1982 (age 43)
27	Nishihara Takuma	(Japan)	SS	17 July 1992 (age 33)
29	Aung Kaung Man	(Myanmar)	CF	18 February 1998 (age 27)
30	Chizoba Christopher	(Nigeria)	CF	17 June 1991 (age 34)

== Transfers ==
In: Note: Flags indicate national team as defined under FIFA eligibility rules; some limited exceptions apply. Players may hold more than one non-FIFA nationality.

No.	Pos.	Nation	Player
—	MF	MYA	Kyaw Zayar Win (from Kanbawza FC)
—	GK	MYA	Tun Lin Soe (from Zeyar Shwe Myay FC)

Out: Note: Flags indicate national team as defined under FIFA eligibility rules; some limited exceptions apply. Players may hold more than one non-FIFA nationality.

No.	Pos.	Nation	Player
5	DF	MYA	Hein Thiha Zaw (to Kanbawza FC)
14	DF	MYA	Htike Htike Aung (to Kanbawza FC)
16	MF	MYA	Kyaw Min Oo (to Yangon United)
17	MF	MYA	Nay Lin Tun (to Kanbawza FC)
9	FW	MYA	Soe Kyaw Kyaw (to Horizon FC)
