= 2016 Hantharwady United FC season =

Hantharwady United
2016 season
- Owner: (Myanmar) U Aung Moe Kyaw
- Chairman: (Myanmar) U Tun Tun Lin
- Manager: (Myanmar) U Ngwe Tun
- Stadium: Bago Stadium

Hanthawaddy United Football Club (Burmese: ဟံသာဝတီ ယူနိုက်တက် ဘောလုံး အသင်း) is a Burmese football club, based in Taungoo, Myanmar, and represents the Bago Region. The club was a founding member of the Myanmar National League (MNL) in 2009.

== Sponsorship ==
Period	Sportswear	Sponsor
2016	(Thailand) FBT	

== Club ==
=== Coaching staff ===
Position	Staff
Manager	(Myanmar) U Ngwe Tun
Assistant Manager	(Myanmar) U Kyaw Soe Oo
Assistant Manager	(Myanmar) U Tun Min Oo
Assistant Manager	(Myanmar)
Goalkeeper Coach	(Myanmar)
Media Officer	(Myanmar) U Min Min Tun
Technical Director	(Singapore) Sivrji

Source: Hantharwaddy United FC

=== Other information ===
Owner	(Myanmar) U Aung Moe Kyaw
C.E.O	(Myanmar)
Ground (capacity and dimensions)	Bago Stadium (4,000 / 103x67 metres)
Training Ground	Bago Stadium

== Current squad ==
This is current squad for MNL 2016 season.

== Players ==
Note: Flags indicate national team as defined under FIFA eligibility rules; some limited exceptions apply. Players may hold more than one non-FIFA nationality.

No.	Pos.	Nation	Player
1	GK	(Myanmar) MYA	Thura Ko Ko
2	MF	(Myanmar) MYA	Myat Kyaw Moe
3	DF	(Myanmar) MYA	Aung Zaw
4	DF	(Myanmar) MYA	Kyaw Kyaw Tun
5	DF	(Myanmar) MYA	Aung Phyo Myint
6	MF	(Myanmar) MYA	Wai Phyo Thu
7	MF	(Myanmar) MYA	Zaw Zin Oo
8	MF	(Myanmar) MYA	Sithu Than Soe
9	MF	(Myanmar) MYA	Yan Naing Aung
10	FW	(Brazil) BRA	Ivan Caelos
11	MF	(Myanmar) MYA	Maung Maung Lwin
12	MF	(Myanmar) MYA	Hla Tun Aung
13	DF	(Myanmar) MYA	Htoo Nay Aung
14	MF	(Myanmar) MYA	Shine Htet Zaw
15	MF	(Myanmar) MYA	Aung Min Thein
16	DF	(Myanmar) MYA	Aung Yar Zar Oo
17	MF	(Myanmar) MYA	Lar Din Maw Yar

No.	Pos.	Nation	Player
18	DF	(Myanmar) MYA	Chit Soe Paing
19	MF	(Myanmar) MYA	Chit Hla Aung
20	GK	(Myanmar) MYA	Ko Ko Naing
21	DF	(Myanmar) MYA	Thet Myo Oo
22	FW	(Myanmar) MYA	Aung Myo Thura
23	FW	(Myanmar) MYA	Aung Aung Oo
24	DF	(Liberia) LBR	George
25	DF	(Myanmar) MYA	Thant Zin Win
28	MF	(Myanmar) MYA	Aung Moe Htwe
29	DF	(Myanmar) MYA	Zin Min Aung
31	FW	(Ivory Coast) CIV	Bamba
32	DF	(Myanmar) MYA	Min Ko Thu
40	GK	(Myanmar) MYA	Naing Lin Tun
63	DF	(Myanmar) MYA	Kyaw Zay Ya
