= 2008 Myanmar Grand Royal Challenge Cup =

Tournament details
- Host country: Myanmar
- Dates: 11 November 2008 - 21 November 2008
- Teams: 6
- Venue: Thuwunna YTC Stadium

Final positions
- Champions: Myanmar (2nd title)
- Runners-up: Indonesia

Tournament statistics
- Top scorer: (Myanmar) Soe Myat Min (5)

The 2008 Myanmar Grand Royal Challenge Cup was the third edition of the Myanmar Grand Royal Challenge Cup, an annual football tournament held in Myanmar. The tournament took place from 11 November to 21 November 2008 in Yangon.

== Teams ==
- Bangladesh
- Indonesia
- Malaysia
- Myanmar (hosts)
- (South Korea) Ulsan Hyundai Reserves^{*}
- Vietnam U-23^{**}

^{*}: An invitee from the South Korean K League, Ulsan sent their reserve team.

^{**}: Vietnam sent their under-23 team.

== Group stage ==
=== Group A ===
Team	Pld	W	D	L	GF	GA	GD	Pts
Myanmar	2	1	1	0	2	1	+1	4
Indonesia	2	1	0	1	3	2	+1	3
Bangladesh	2	0	1	1	0	2	-2	1

11 November 2008

Myanmar	0 – 0	Bangladesh
	(Report)

Thuwunna YTC Stadium
Attendance: 5,500

13 November 2008
15:00

Bangladesh	0 – 2	Indonesia
	(Report)	Firman 10'; Talaohu 45'

Thuwunna YTC Stadium

15 November 2008

Myanmar	2 – 1	Indonesia
Yan Paing 44'; Kyaw Thiha 65'	(Report)	Ismed 38'

Thuwunna YTC Stadium

=== Group B ===
Team	Pld	W	D	L	GF	GA	GD	Pts
(South Korea) Ulsan Hyundai Reserves	2	1	1	0	5	2	+3	4
Malaysia	2	1	1	0	4	1	+3	4
Vietnam	2	0	0	2	1	7	-6	0

12 November 2008

Malaysia	3 – 0	Vietnam
Indra Putra 26'; Amirul 40'; Hardi 55'	(Report)

Thuwunna YTC Stadium

14 November 2008

Malaysia	1 – 1	(South Korea) Ulsan Hyundai Reserves
Adha 52'	(Report)	Seo Sung-Hwan 83'

Thuwunna YTC Stadium

16 November 2008

Ulsan Hyundai Reserves (South Korea)	4 – 1	Vietnam
Lee Jin-Woo 48'; Kim Sung-Min 56'; Kim Cheol-Bae 68'; Young Seok 82'	(Report)	Hoàng Nhật Nam 74'

Thuwunna YTC Stadium

== Knockout stages ==
Semi-finals
18 November
Myanmar	4
Malaysia	1
19 November
(South Korea) Ulsan Hyundai Reserve	0 (3)
Indonesia	0 (4)

Final
21 November
Myanmar	2
Indonesia	1

=== Semi-finals ===
18 November 2008

Myanmar	4 – 1	Malaysia
Soe Myat Min 25', 45', 89'; Aung Kyaw Moe 90+3'	Report	Amirul 75'

Thuwunna YTC Stadium
Attendance: 30,000
19 November 2008

Ulsan Hyundai Reserves (South Korea)	0 – 0 a.e.t.	Indonesia
	(Report)
Penalties
Park Dong-Hyuk (penalty scored); Lee Jin-Ho (penalty missed); Kim Dong-Kyu (penalty scored); Seo Byung-Hwan (penalty scored); Park Byung-Gyu (penalty missed); Kwon Hyuk-Jin (penalty missed)	3 – 4	(penalty missed) Bambang; (penalty scored) Isnan; (penalty missed) Elie; (penalty scored) Erol; (penalty scored) Charis; (penalty scored) Firman

Thuwunna YTC Stadium
Attendance: 30,000

=== Final ===
21 November 2008

Myanmar	2 – 1	Indonesia
Soe Myat Min 3', 63'	(Report)	Moe Win 14' (o.g.)

Thuwunna YTC Stadium
Attendance: 20,000

== Winners ==
2008 Myanmar Grand Royal Challenge Cup winners

Myanmar
Second title

== Goalscorers ==
5 goals:

- (Myanmar) Soe Myat Min

2 goals:

- (Malaysia) Mohd Amirul Hadi Zainal

1 goal:

- (Indonesia) Firman Utina
- (Indonesia) Talaohu Musafri
- (Indonesia) Ismed Sofyan
- (Malaysia) Indra Putra Mahayuddin
- (Malaysia) Mohammad Hardi Jaafar
- (Malaysia) Mohd Zaquan Adha Abdul Radzak
- (Myanmar) Aung Kyaw Moe
- (Myanmar) Yan Paing
- (Myanmar) Kyaw Thiha
- (South Korea) Seo Sung-Hwan
- (South Korea) Lee Jin-Woo
- (South Korea) Kim Sung-Min
- (South Korea) Kim Cheol-Bae
- (South Korea) Young Seok
- (Vietnam) Hoàng Nhật Nam

1 own goal

- (Myanmar) Moe Win (for Indonesia)
