= Kim Seong-min =

- Hangul: 김성민
- RR: Gim Seongmin
- MR: Kim Sŏngmin

Kim Seong-min is the common English spelling of a Korean name also spelled Kim Sung-min. It may refer to:

- Kim Sung-min (actor) (1973–2016), South Korean actor
- Kim Sung-min (footballer, born 1981), South Korean footballer
- Kim Sung-min (footballer, born 1985), South Korean footballer
- Kim Sung-min (judoka) (born 1987), South Korean judoka
- Kim Sung-min (volleyball) (born 1994), South Korean volleyball player
- Kim Seong-min (defector) (1962–2025), North Korean defector who founded Free North Korea Radio
- Kim Seong-min (field hockey), participant in 1999 Men's Hockey Champions Trophy
- Kim Seong-min (model), winner of 2012 Miss World Korea
- Kim Sungmin (general), South Korean deputy commander of ROK/US Combined Forces Command
