= 2015 Hanthawaddy United season =

Hantharwady United
2015 season
- Owner: (Myanmar) U Aung Moe Kyaw
- Manager: (Myanmar) U Ngwe Tun
- Stadium: Bago Stadium
- Myanmar National League: 7th
- Bogyoke Aung San Cup: Quarter-final

Hanthawaddy United Football Club (Burmese: ဟံသာဝတီ ယူနိုက်တက် ဘောလုံး အသင်း) is a Burmese football club, based in Taungoo, Myanmar. It represents the Bago Region. The club was a founding member of the Myanmar National League (MNL) in 2009.

== Sponsorship ==
Period	Sportswear	Sponsor
2015		

== Club ==
=== Coaching staff ===
Position	Staff
Manager	(Myanmar) U Ngwe Tun
Assistant Manager	(Myanmar)
Assistant Manager	(Myanmar)
Assistant Manager	(Myanmar)
Goalkeeper Coach	(Myanmar)
Fitness Coach	(Myanmar)
Youth Team Head Coach	(Myanmar)

Source: Hantharwaddy United FC

=== Other information ===
Owner	(Myanmar) U Aung Moe Kyaw
C.E.O	(Myanmar)
Ground (capacity and dimensions)	Bago Stadium (4,000 / 103x67 metres)
Training Ground	Bago Stadium

== General Aung San Shield ==
Date	Round	Team 1	Result	Team 2
27/4/2015	1st	Pong Gan FC	1 - 11	Hantharwady United
14/7/2015	2nd	Hantharwady United	3 - 1	Kanbawza
2/8/2015	Quarter-final	Hantharwady United	1 - 2	Yadanarbon

== Current squad (2015) ==
The management has assembled a team consisted mostly of young players. Goalkeeper Ko Ko Aung, part of the current Myanmar national football team roster, is the only local player with notable experience in the team.

== Players ==
Note: Flags indicate national team as defined under FIFA eligibility rules; some limited exceptions apply. Players may hold more than one non-FIFA nationality.

No.	Pos.	Nation	Player
2	DF	(Myanmar) MYA	Nyein Chan
3	DF	(Myanmar) MYA	Aung Zaw
4	DF	(Myanmar) MYA	Kyaw Soe Lwin
5	DF	(Myanmar) MYA	Aung Phyo Myint
6	DF	(Myanmar) MYA	Wai Phyo Thu
8	MF	(Myanmar) MYA	Myo Zaw Oo
9	FW	(Cameroon) CMR	Ousmanou
10	MF	(Myanmar) MYA	Paing Moe Wai
11	FW	(Myanmar) MYA	Myint Naing
12	MF	(Myanmar) MYA	Hla Tun Aung
13	DF	(Myanmar) MYA	Htoo Nay Aung
16	MF	(Myanmar) MYA	Aung Yazar Oo
18	DF	(Myanmar) MYA	Chit Soe Paing

No.	Pos.	Nation	Player
20	GK	(Myanmar) MYA	Ko Ko Naing
22	MF	(Myanmar) MYA	Aung Myo Thura
23	FW	(Myanmar) MYA	Aung Aung Oo
24	MF	(Liberia) LBR	Melvin George
25	MF	(Myanmar) MYA	Kyaw Min Htike
26	MF	(Myanmar) MYA	Naing Naing Aung
27	MF	(Myanmar) MYA	Maung Maung Lwin
31	FW	(Ivory Coast) CIV	Bamba
32	DF	(Myanmar) MYA	Kyaw Kyaw Tun
33	DF	(Myanmar) MYA	La Din Maw Yar
40	GK	(Myanmar) MYA	Yan Aung Lin
63	DF	(Myanmar) MYA	Kyaw Zay Ya
