= Chizoba =

Chizoba is a given name and surname. Notable people with the name include:

- Andrea Chizoba Akudolu (born 1973), British actress
- Christopher Chizoba (born 1991), Nigerian footballer
- Sunday Chizoba (born 1989), Nigerian footballer
