= Ndongo Serge Philippe =

Cameroonian-born Burmese footballer

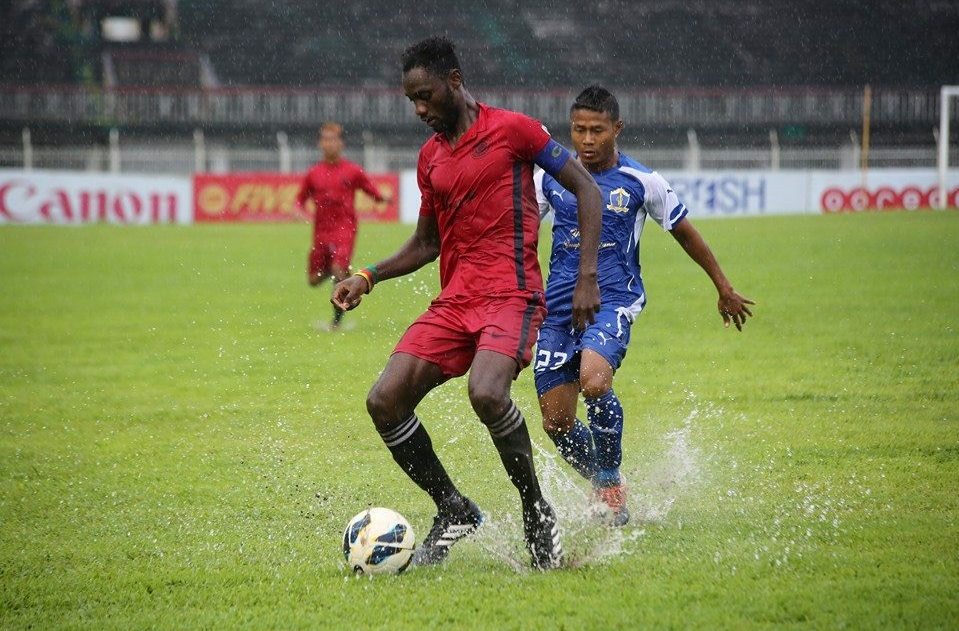

Personal information
- Full name: Ndongo Serge Philippe
- Date of birth: April 23, 1993 (age 33)
- Place of birth: Cameroon
- Height: 1.85 m (6 ft 1 in)
- Positions: Defensive midfielder; central defender

Team information
- Current team: Ayeyawady United FC

Youth career
- 2004–2006: Kadji Sport Academy
- 2006–2008: Academy Sport Center
- 2009–2010: Foyer Du Football Et Animation

Senior career*
Years	Team	Apps	(Gls)
2010–2011	Wouri FC	35	(6)
2012–2013	Don Bosco SC	20	(1)
2013–2015	GFA F.C.	44	(8)
2015–2016	Rakhine United FC		
2017–2018	Ayeyawady United FC	19	(1)

International career^{‡}
2007–2008	Cameroon U-17		
- * Club domestic league appearances and goals as of October 5, 2015 ‡ National team caps and goals as of October 21, 2012

Ndondo Serge Philippe is a footballer who plays in Myanmar.

== Profile ==
Ndondo Serge Philippe is a Cameroonian footballer who plays for Rakhine United as a center back and defensive midfielder. He learned to play football in several academies in Cameroon such as Kadji sport academy, academy sport center, and Foyer du Football et animation.

In 2010, at 17 years old, he signed a contract with a division 2 team in Cameroon named Wouri FC. In 2012 he signed with Don Bosco SC in Sri Lanka, for whom he played 20 games, scored 1 goal, and competed in the semi-final playoffs against Dialog Champions League.

When he moved to Myanmar he signed with GFA FC (Gospel for Asia) who played in MNL1, the highest league in the country. The team was relegated at the end of the 2013–2014 season and Ndondo was re-signed by his former club and plays MNL2 as team Captain. His great performance during league, namely his hat-trick score as center back and two other goals as midfielder, and Ooredoo cup helped him to make a one-year deal with Rakhine United FC for the 2015–2016 season. In 2017 he signed 1-year contract with Ayeyawady United FC for the season.

== Honors ==
=== 2005–2006 ===
Minimal National Champions (Cameroon)

=== 2007–2008 ===
Cup Winner Under 17 (Cameroon)

=== 2008–2009 ===
Selected National Team Cameroon Under 17 (Cameroon)
