= Bamba Gaoussou =

Ivorian footballer

Gaoussou Bamba
Personal information
- Full name: Gaoussou Bamba
- Date of birth: June 17, 1984 (age 42)
- Place of birth: Abidjan, Ivory Coast
- Height: 1.70 m (5 ft 7 in)
- Position: Striker

Team information
- Current team: Dagon FC
- Number: 24

Senior career*
Years	Team	Apps	(Gls)
2007	Suphanburi FC	30	(9)
2008	Osotsapa FC	30	(5)
2009	BEC Tero Sasana	10	(1)
2009	Yangon United FC	6	(2)
2010–2011	Nay Pyi Taw F.C.	33	(27)
2019–	Dagon FC		
- * Club domestic league appearances and goals as of 26 January 2019

Gaoussou Bamba (born June 17, 1984) is an Ivorian footballer. He currently plays for Yangon United FC.
