= Lee Han-guk =

South Korean footballer

Personal information
- Date of birth: 18 December 1987 (age 38)
- Height: 1.78 m (5 ft 10 in)
- Position: Midfielder

Senior career*
Years	Team	Apps	(Gls)
2013	Police United	21	(1)
2014	TOT	6	(0)
2018	Shan United	14	(1)
- * Club domestic league appearances and goals as of 15:04, 15 April 2019 (UTC)

Lee Han-guk is a South Korean footballer who last played for Shan United.

== Career statistics ==
=== Club ===
As of 15 April 2019.

Club	Season	League			Cup		Continental		Other		Total	
Club	Season	Division	Apps	Goals	Apps	Goals	Apps	Goals	Apps	Goals	Apps	Goals
Police United	2013	Thai Premier League	21	1	0	0	0	0	0	0	21	1
TOT	2014	Thai Premier League	6	0	0	0	0	0	0	0	6	0
Shan United	2018	Myanmar National League	14	1	0	0	6 (Note: One appearance in the 2018 AFC Champions League qualifying play-offs, five appearances in the AFC Cup)	0	0	0	20	1
Career total			41	2	0	0	6	0	0	0	47	2
