= Kim Sung-min (volleyball) =

South Korean volleyball player (born 1994)

Personal information
- Nationality: South Korean
- Born: 12 August 1994 (age 32); Incheon, South Korea
- Height: 191 cm (6 ft 3 in)
- Weight: 85 kg (187 lb)
- Spike: 310 cm (10 ft 2 in)
- Block: 300 cm (9 ft 10 in)
- Education: Inha University

Volleyball information
- Position: Outside hitter
- Current club: Incheon Korean Air Jumbos
- Number: 18

Career
Years	Teams
2016–	Korean Air Jumbos
Honours
Asian U23 Championship
Silver medal – second place	2015 Naypyidaw
- Last updated: 10 February 2018

Kim Sung-min (Korean: 김성민; born 12 August 1994 in Incheon) is a South Korean male volleyball player. He currently plays for the Incheon Korean Air Jumbos in the V-League.

== Career ==
=== Clubs ===
After finishing a successful college volleyball career at Inha University, where he was recognized as the top collegiate spiker in the country, Kim was eligible for the V-League draft. He was selected by the Korean Air Jumbos with the fourth pick of the first round in the 2016 V-League Draft.

=== National team ===
As a junior at Inha University in 2015, Kim was selected for the South Korean collegiate national team to participate in the 2015 Asian U23 Championship, the 2015 FIVB U23 World Championship and the 2015 Summer Universiade.
