= Lee Jin-woo (footballer) =

South Korean footballer

Personal information
- Date of birth: September 3, 1982 (age 44)
- Place of birth: South Korea
- Height: 1.78 m (5 ft 10 in)
- Position: Forward

Team information
- Current team: Ulsan Hyundai Mipo Dolphin FC
- Number: 19

Youth career
- 1998–2000: Gwangyang Jecheol High School
- 2001–2004: Korea University

Senior career*
Years	Team	Apps	(Gls)
2005	Icheon Sangmu	10	(0)
2007–2008	Ulsan Hyundai	9	(0)
2009	Daejeon Citizen	0	(0)
2010–2013	Ulsan Hyundai Mipo Dockyard	29	(3)
2015–	Ulsan Hyundai Mipo Dolphin FC	0	(0)
- * Club domestic league appearances and goals

- Lee Jin-woo
- Hangul: 이진우
- Hanja: 李鎭宇
- RR: I Jinu
- MR: I Chinu

Lee Jin-woo (born September 3, 1982) is a South Korean football player.

== Club career ==
Lee started his professional career with the K League club Ulsan Hyundai FC before switching to Daejeon Citizen for the 2009 season. Having had limited opportunities with Daejeon, for 2010, Lee dropped down to the second tier of Korean football, the Korea National League, in order to ply his trade with Ulsan Hyundai Mipo Dockyard FC.
