= Kim Sung-min (footballer, born 1981) =

South Korean footballer

Personal information
- Full name: Kim Sung-min
- Date of birth: February 6, 1981 (age 45)
- Place of birth: South Korea
- Height: 1.85 m (6 ft 1 in)
- Position: Goalkeeper

Youth career
- Korea University

Senior career*
Years	Team	Apps	(Gls)
2003–2005	Ulsan Hyundai	0	(0)
2005–2010	Bucheon SK/Jeju United	12	(0)
2006–2007	→ Gwangju Sangmu (military service)	5	(0)
- * Club domestic league appearances and goals as of 12:41, 28 May 2009 (UTC)

- Kim Sung-min
- Hangul: 김성민
- RR: Gim Seongmin
- MR: Kim Sŏngmin

Kim Sung-min (Korean: 김성민, born 6 February 1981) is a former South Korean footballer who last played for Jeju United FC in the K League. He also played for Ulsan Hyundai.
