= Patrick Asare =

Ghanaian footballer

Personal information
- Full name: Patrick Asare
- Date of birth: 14 February 1995 (age 31)
- Place of birth: Accra, Ghana
- Height: 1.78 m (5 ft 10 in)
- Position: Forward

Team information
- Current team: Kaya–Iloilo
- Number: 11

Youth career
- 2005–2009: Magic Stars FC
- 2009–2010: Midtjylland

Senior career*
Years	Team	Apps	(Gls)
2011–2013	Dreams	48	(31)
2013–2014	Karela United	11	(9)
2016	Zwekapin United	10	(5)
2017	Yadanarbon	7	(10)
2018	Shan United	4	(0)
2019	Johor Bahru	7	(3)
2020–2021	Semarak	2	(1)
2021–	Kaya–Iloilo	0	(0)
- * Club domestic league appearances and goals as of 2 May 2018

Patrick Asare (born 14 February 1995) is a Ghanaian footballer who plays as a forward for Kaya–Iloilo in the Philippines Football League.

== Early life ==
Patrick was born in Accra, Ghana where he competed in youth tournaments and was often fielded in matches for higher age groups; Asare was playing for a U-12 team at 8 years old, and for a U-14 team at 9 years old.

== Club career ==
=== Ghana Division One ===
Asare played in Ghana's Division One League playing professional football clubs Dreams and later Karela United.

=== Hiatus in Malaysia ===
Asare first came to Malaysia in 2014 supposedly to seal a deal that would enable him to play for a reputed club. However he was left stranded in the country without a club after he found out that he was deceived by a fake agent. He was taken in by a local church and Asare decided to continue his studies in Malaysia and pursued a degree in sports management with a focus on football studies. He also went to the United Kingdom in 2016 to finish his studies.

=== Zwegabin United F.C. ===
After a two-year hiatus, Asare participated in a tryout organized by Myanmar League 1 club Zwekapin United. which led to him being signed in by the club.

=== Yadanarbon F.C. ===
Patrick signed with Yadanarbon in the second quarter of the 2017 Myanmar National League after an impressive short contract spell with Zwekapin United He was also included in squads for the 2017 Myanmar National League. Patrick scored a total of 10 goals in 7 league appearances as well as 2 goals in 2 appearances in the General Aung San Shield for Yadanarbon, making it a total of 12 goals scored in 9 matches played for the team.

=== Kaya–Iloilo ===
Philippines Football League side Kaya–Iloilo announced in April 2021 that they have signed in Asare to play for the club.
