= Aung Zaw (footballer) =

Burmese footballer

Personal information
- Full name: Aung Zaw
- Date of birth: 5 March 1990 (age 36)
- Height: 1.77 m (5 ft 9 1/2 in)
- Positions: Centre back; right back

Senior career*
Years	Team	Apps	(Gls)
2009–2021	Hantharwady United	220	(0)
2013–2014	→ Yangon United (loan)	32	(0)

International career^{‡}
2013	Myanmar U23	3	(0)
2012–2021	Myanmar	21	(0)
- * Club domestic league appearances and goals as of 16 July 2023 ‡ National team caps and goals as of 10 Jan 2014

Aung Zaw (Burmese: အောင်ဇော်; born 5 March 1990) is a Burmese footballer who plays as a defender for Myanmar national football team.

He currently plays for Hantharwady United in Myanmar National League.
