= Maung Maung Lwin =

Burmese footballer (born 1995)

Personal information
- Full name: Maung Maung Lwin
- Date of birth: 18 June 1995 (age 31)
- Place of birth: Dala Township, Myanmar
- Height: 1.78 m (5 ft 10 in)
- Position: Winger

Team information
- Current team: Yangon United

Senior career*
Years	Team	Apps	(Gls)
2014–2017	Hantharwady United	87	(14)
2017–2021	Yangon United	48	(18)
2021–2026	Lamphun Warriors	102	(12)
2026–	Yangon United	10	(5)

International career^{‡}
2014–2015	Myanmar U20	5	(0)
2016–2019	Myanmar U23	16	(5)
2022	Myanmar U23 (Wildcard)	4	(0)
2015–	Myanmar	96	(16)
- * Club domestic league appearances and goals as of 25 July 2026 ‡ National team caps and goals as of 4 August 2026

Maung Maung Lwin (Burmese: မောင်မောင်လွင်; born 18 June 1995) is a Burmese professional footballer who plays as a winger for Myanmar National League club Yangon United and captains the Myanmar national team. He also represented his country at the 2015 FIFA U-20 World Cup.

In 2022, Maung won the Thai League 2 with Lamphun Warriors, making him the first Burmese footballer to win a trophy abroad.

In 2025, Maung scored the only goal for ASEAN All-Stars against Manchester United in their 1–0 win. This makes him the first Burmese footballer in Myanmar football history to score a goal against an English team.

== Club career ==
Maung started his professional football career with Hantharwady United in January 2014.

=== Yangon United ===
On 23 November 2017, Maung moved to the capital city to join Yangon United. He made his debut for the club in the 2018 season against his former club in a 2–1 win on 14 January 2018. In his first season, he won the league title and the 2018 MFF Charity Cup with the club.

Maung make his AFC Cup debut on 26 February 2019 in a 3–1 lost to Singapore club Tampines Rovers. He would go on to scored the only goal in the match in a 1–0 away win against Vietnamese club Hà Nội on 2 April 2019. During the 2020 AFC Cup qualifying play-offs against Bruneian club Indera, Maung was instrumental in both tie as he scored a goal and recorded three assists in a 9–2 aggregate win which send his team to the 2020 AFC Cup.

=== Lamphun Warriors ===
On 21 December 2021, Maung Maung Lwin moved to Thailand to joined with Thai League 2 club Lamphun Warriors. On 8 January 2022, he provided an assist on his debut in a 2–0 win to Customs United. Maung then scored his first goal for the club in 3–1 win against Muangkan United on 12 February. Maung then put on a 'Man of the Match' performances with a goal scored and providing two assists which put his team in a 3–2 win over Chiangmai on 25 February. In his first season at the club, he won the 2021–22 Thai League 2 where he became the first ever Myanmar player to win the Thai League 2 title. After 2025-26 Thai League 1 season, Lamphun Warriors announced a farewell for Maung Maung Lwin.

== International career ==
Maung was called up to the Myanmar national team in September 2015 for a friendly match against New Zealand but didn't featured in the match. He had to wait until October where he made his debut against Lebanon on 8 October during the 2018 FIFA World Cup qualification.

Maung scored his first goal for Myanmar on 6 June 2016 against Hong Kong where he also provided an assist in a 3–0 win in the 2016 AYA Bank Cup.

Maung was selected to captain Myanmar in the October 2018 international friendly match against Bolivia and Bahrain.

During the second round of the 2022 FIFA World Cup qualification on 14 November 2019. Maung scored a goal and provided an assist which gave Myanmar their first win in Group F in a 4–3 win over Tajikistan.

In the 2022 AFF Championship, Maung scored a brace in a 3–2 loss against Singapore on 24 December 2022.

In the 2024 AFF Championship, he scored a goal from a free kick against Philippines. He is known for his free kick taking ability.

In the Maybank Challenge Cup, he scored the winning goal for ASEAN All-Stars against Manchester United in the 71st minute.

== Career statistics ==
=== Internationals goals and apps ===
– Internationals goals and apps
Team	Internationals	Goals	assists	apps
Yangon United	AFC Champions League	0	0	2
Yangon United	AFC Champions League 2	7	10	17

– Internationals goals and apps
National Team	Internationals	Goals	apps
Myanmar U20	FIFA U20 World Cup	0	3

=== Club ===
Appearances and goals by club team and year
Club team	Year	Apps	Goals	Assists
Hantharwady United	2014	21	2	5
Hantharwady United	2015	22	2	4
Hantharwady United	2016	22	7	3
Hantharwady United	2017	22	3	0
Total		87	14	12

Appearances and goals by club team and year
Club team	Year	Apps	Goals	Assists
Yangon United	2018	28	12	6
Yangon United	2019	30	11	1
Yangon United	2020	14	4	7
Total		72	27	14

Appearances and goals by club team and year
Club team	Year	Apps	Goals	Assists
Lamphun Warriors	2021–2022	18	4	7
Lamphun Warriors	2022–2023	25	3	4
Lamphun Warriors	2023–2024	34	3	7
Lamphun Warriors	2024–2025	25	2	6
Lamphun Warriors	2025–2026	15	2	6
Total		117	14	30

Appearances and goals by club team and year
Club team	Year	Apps	Goals	Assists
Yangon United	2025–2026	10	5	4
Total		10	5	4

=== International ===
As of match played 4 August 2026

Myanmar national team
Year	Apps	Goals	Assists
2015	3	0	1
2016	12	1	3
2017	9	1	1
2018	10	1	1
2019	8	1	3
2020	0	0	0
2021	11	2	2
2022	4	3	1
2023	11	1	3
2024	15	3	6
2025	6	1	2
2026	7	2	5
Total	96	16	28

=== International goals ===
Scores and results list Myanmar's goal tally first.

No.	Date	Venue	Opponent	Score	Result	Competition
1.	6 June 2016	Thuwunna Stadium, Yangon, Myanmar	Hong Kong	2–0	3–0	2016 AYA Bank Cup
2.	21 March 2017	Pakansari Stadium, Bogor, Indonesia	Indonesia	1–1	3–1	Friendly
3	16 November 2018	New Laos National Stadium, Vientiane, Laos	Laos	3–1	3–1	2018 AFF Championship
4	14 November 2019	Mandalarthiri Stadium, Mandalay, Myanmar	Tajikistan	4–2	4–3	2022 FIFA World Cup qualification
5.	25 November 2021	Emirhan Sports Complex, Antalya, Turkey	Indonesia	1–4	1–4	Friendly
6	8 December 2021	National Stadium, Kallang, Singapore	Timor-Leste	2–0	2–0	2020 AFF Championship
7.	24 December 2022	Jalan Besar Stadium, Kallang, Singapore	Singapore	1–0	2–3	2022 AFF Championship
8.	24 December 2022	Jalan Besar Stadium, Kallang, Singapore	Singapore	2–2	2–3	2022 AFF Championship
9.	30 December 2022	Thuwunna Stadium, Yangon, Myanmar	Laos	2–2	2–2	2022 AFF Championship
10.	19 June 2023	Dalian Pro Soccer Academy Base, Dalian, China	Macau	2–0	2–0	Friendly
11.	10 October 2024	Thuwunna Stadium, Yangon, Myanmar	Sri Lanka	2–0	2–0	Friendly
12.	19 November 2024	Thuwunna Stadium, Yangon, Myanmar	Lebanon	1–1	2–3	Friendly
13.	12 December 2024	Rizal Memorial Stadium, Manila, Philippines	Philippines	1–0	1–1	2024 ASEAN Championship
14.	25 March 2025	Thuwunna Stadium, Yangon, Myanmar	Afghanistan	2–1	2–1	2027 AFC Asian Cup qualification
15.	6 June 2026	Rizal Memorial Stadium, Manila, Philippines	Guam	2–0	6–1	Friendly
16.	4 August 2026	Thuwunna Stadium, Yangon, Myanmar	Laos	4–2	7–2	2026 ASEAN Championship

== Honours ==
Yangon United

- Myanmar National League: 2018
- MFF Charity Cup: 2018

Lamphun Warrior

- Thai League 2: 2021–22

ASEAN All-Stars

- Maybank Challenge Cup: 2025

Myanmar

- Tri-Nation Series (India) runner-up: 2023

Individual

- Myanmar National League Best Player of the Year: 2018
