= FBT (company) =

Thai sports equipment company

Football Thai Factory Sporting Goods
- Company type: Limited
- Industry: Sportswear; apparel
- Founded: 30 September 1952; 73 years ago
- Founder: Kamol Chokephaibulkit
- Headquarters: FBT Sport Complex Co.Ltd. FBT Sport Complex Hua Mark and Outlet. 537 Ramkhamhaeng Road, Hua Mark sub-district, Bang Kapi district, Bangkok, Thailand
- Area served: Worldwide
- Products: Athletic shoes; apparel; sports equipment
- Website: fbtsports.com

Football Thai Factory Sporting Goods Co, Ltd., known as FBT, is a Thai sports equipment company founded in 1952. It operates over 300 stores nationwide and exports to over 40 countries worldwide.

== History ==
In 1947, the founder of FBT, Kamol Chokephaibulkit emigrated from China to Bangkok, Thailand. Initially working as a leather repairman, his interest in sports equipment began in 1950, when he was asked to repair an imported football. After studying its design, he began making footballs by hand, producing two to three balls per day from his home. He later sold these footballs at local sporting goods stores and department stores, such as Nightingale–Olympic.

In 1952, Chokephaibulkit established the Football Thai Factory, located in Lat Krabang district. By 1954, it had expanded and become Football Thai Factory Sporting Goods Co., Ltd.—FBT for short. By 1961, FBT had opened its first retail store, in Siam Square. In 1963, Chokephaibulkit had the opportunity to present FBT-made footballs and rugby balls to King Bhumibol Adulyadej, during the Thai Products Exhibition.

FBT continued to grow and gained recognition at the 1966 Asian Games, in Bangkok, where it served as the official sponsor. The company's profile grew among Thai and international athletes, leading to the opening of its flagship retail store, near Suphachalasai Stadium. In 1978, FBT became the first Asian company to receive certification from FIFA for its footballs, which were subsequently used at the 1978 Asian Games, in Bangkok.

Throughout the 1980s and 1990s, FBT received multiple awards, including the Best Sporting Goods Manufacturer Award (1984) and the Prime Minister's Export Award (1988). In 1992, the company became the first Thai sports manufacturer to sponsor the National Olympic Committee of Thailand, supporting Thai teams in the SEA Games, Asian Games, and Olympic Games. This partnership with Thai sports organizations has continued for decades, including a long-standing sponsorship with the Football Association of Thailand.

The 1990s saw further expansion, including the opening of a second factory in 1993, which became one of Thailand's largest sports equipment facilities, and the establishment of the FBT Sport Complex in 1995, which became the company's head office. In 1998, FBT was the main sponsor of the 1998 Asian Games, in Bangkok, and gained rights to manufacture products for the 1998 World Cup, in France.

FBT celebrated its 50th anniversary in 2002. During that decade, the company expanded its sponsorships and awards, receiving the Superbrands prize in 2005 and 2007. It also became the primary sponsor of the International Federation of Pétanque. In 2008, FBT opened a new manufacturing building for sports clothing, followed by a fitness center in 2009 within the FBT Sport Complex. The company also actively supported local communities, providing a sports field in the Lat Krabang and Nong Chok districts.

FBT has subsequently maintained a role as an official sponsor for multiple international and regional sports events, including the 2015 Deaf Futsal World Cup, the 2016 Asian Beach Games, and the 2017 SEA Games.

== Business ==
=== Market ===
FBT manufactures and distributes sports products to various countries under the trademarks FBT, Five Star, Super Star, and La Franc. Its overseas markets include the United Kingdom, Australia, Canada, Russia, Malaysia, Singapore, the Philippines, Myanmar, Laos, Vietnam, Cambodia, Papua New Guinea, Bhutan, Nepal, Sri Lanka, and the Maldives.

=== Financial ===
Profit

| Year | Profit (THB) | Growth from previous year (percentage) |
|---|---|---|
| 2014 | -38,654,274 | |
| 2015 | -72,670,906 | -88 |
| 2016 | -707,756,908 | -873.9 |
| 2017 | 47,091,323 | +106.7 |
| 2018 | 1,333,532,866 | +2731.8 |
| 2019 | 58,403,479 | -95.6 |
| 2020 | 3,116,575 | -94.7 |
| 2021 | -2,651,468 | -185.1 |
| 2022 | -5,765,016 | -117.4 |
| 2023 | -2,848,876 | +50.6 |

Net property

| Year | Net property (THB) | Growth from previous year (percentage) |
|---|---|---|
| 2014 | 1,708,022,701 | |
| 2015 | 1,665,961,163 | -2.5 |
| 2016 | 1,459,618,062 | -12.4 |
| 2017 | 1,381,715,680 | -5.3 |
| 2018 | 1,176,612,213 | -14.8 |
| 2019 | 1,085,840,248 | -7.7 |
| 2020 | 853,469,367 | -21.4 |
| 2021 | 898,298,314 | +5.3 |
| 2022 | 934,136,555 | +4 |
| 2023 | 977,481,110 | +4.6 |

=== Sponsorships ===
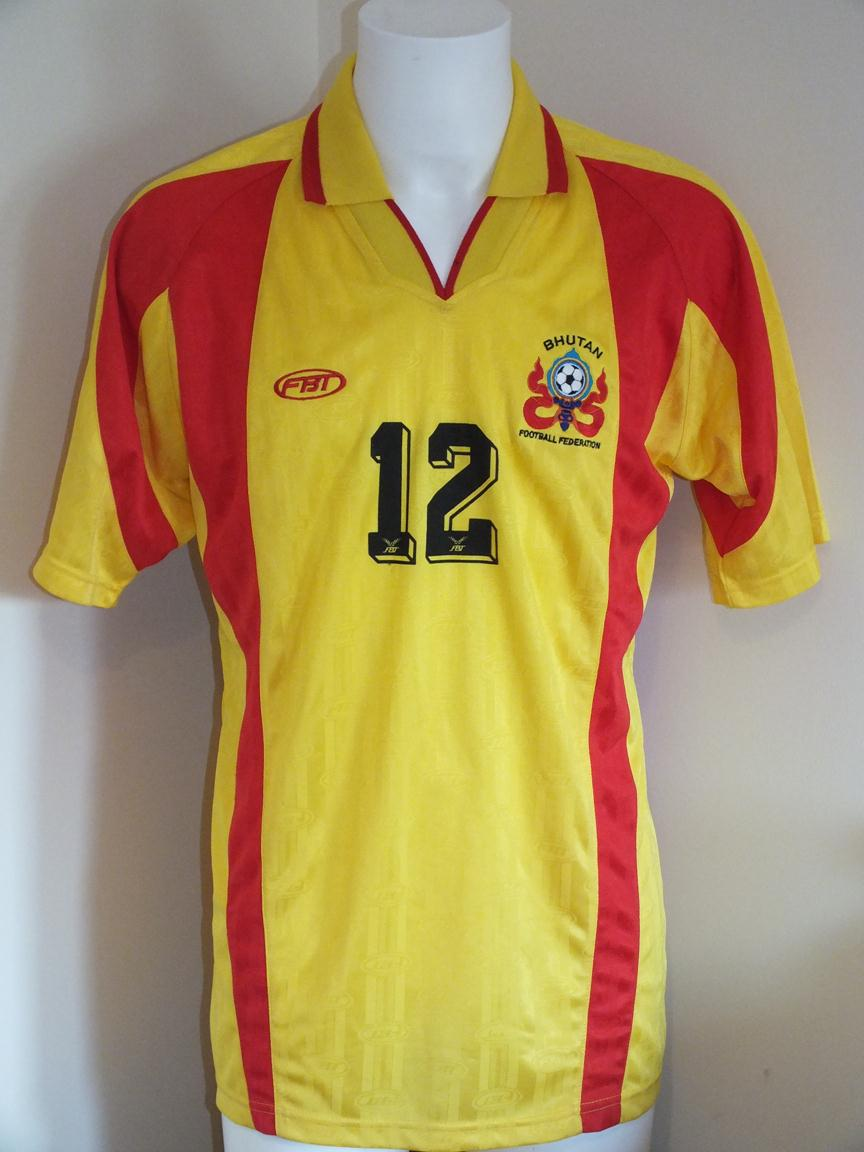
Official Bhutan home shirt worn during "the Other Final" against Montserrat in 2002
