= Christopher Chizoba =

Nigerian professional footballer (born 1991)

Personal information
- Full name: Christopher Chizoba Iyikwobe
- Date of birth: 17 June 1991 (age 35)
- Place of birth: Lagos, Nigeria
- Height: 6 ft 1 in (1.86 m)
- Position: Striker

Senior career*
Years	Team	Apps	(Gls)
- Kalighat MS
- Mohammedan
- Shillong Lajong
- Kalighat MS
2013–2014	Mohun Bagan	13	(5)
2015	Lonestar Kashmir		
2016	Ayeyawady United	23	(16)
2017–2018	Shan United	49	(26)
2019–2020	Welwalo Adigrat		
2020–2021	Arambagh KS	10	(3)
2021–2022	Tollygunge Agragami		
2022	Forward Club Agartala		
2025–2026	Burdwan Blasters		
2026	Thimphu FC		
- * Club domestic league appearances and goals

Christopher Chizoba (born 17 June 1991) is a Nigerian professional footballer who plays as a striker.

== Career ==
Through his career Chizoba has played at various clubs around Kolkata and once in North-East India. He started at Kalighat MS before joining Mohammedan. He then moved to Shillong Lajong of the I-League for a bit before rejoining Kalighat MS. He then ended up playing for Peerless in the Calcutta Football League.

On 4 December 2013 it was officially announced that Chizoba had signed with Mohun Bagan A.C. of the I-League. He made his debut on 6 December 2013 against United S.C. at the Salt Lake Stadium in which he scored 2 goals in the 20th and 45+1st minutes respectively and played till 90+8th minutes before being replaced by Aiborlang Khongjee as Mohun Bagan won the match 4–0.

Chizoba announced on his Facebook page in 2019, that he had joined Welwalo Adigrat.

On 14 December 2020, Chizoba signed with Arambagh KS for the 2020–21 season in Bangladesh Premier League.

On 23 December 2020, Chizoba scores his 1st goal with Arambagh KS in 2020–21 Bangladesh Federation Cup.

== Honours ==
=== Individual ===
- Myanmar National League Top Scorer: 2016, 2017
