= Nay Lin Tun =

Burmese footballer

Personal information
- Full name: Nay Lin Tun
- Date of birth: 27 March 1993 (age 33)
- Place of birth: Ayeyawady Division, Myanmar
- Height: 1.69 m (5 ft 6 1/2 in)
- Position: Midfielder

Team information
- Current team: Sagaing United
- Number: 10

Senior career*
Years	Team	Apps	(Gls)
2012–2015	Ayeyawady United		
2016–2019	Shan United		
2023-	Sagaing United		

International career^{‡}
2012	Myanmar U22	0	(0)
2013–	Myanmar U23	5	(3)
2013–	Myanmar	6	(0)
Medal record
Myanmar
SEA Games
Silver medal – second place	Singapore 2015	Team
- * Club domestic league appearances and goals as of 20 Feb 2023 ‡ National team caps and goals as of 19 January 2018

Nay Lin Tun (born 19 March 1993) is a Burmese footballer who plays as a midfielder for Ayeyawady United. He played for Myanmar U23 at the 2013 SEA Games and 2015 SEA Games. He captained the team five times and scored three goals. His winning goal against Vietnam in the semifinals secured the Myanmar U-23 team a place in the finals of the 2015 Singapore SEA Games.

== Honours ==
=== Club ===
Ayeyawady United

- MFF Cup (2): 2012, 2014
- 2015 General Aung San Shield
