= Yan Naing Oo =

Burmese footballer

Personal information
- Full name: Yan Naing Oo
- Date of birth: 31 March 1996 (age 30)
- Place of birth: Yangon, Myanmar
- Height: 1.69 m (5 ft 7 in)
- Positions: Attacking midfielder; winger

Team information
- Current team: Dagon Star United
- Number: 70

Youth career
- 2013–15: Zeyar Shwe Myay Youth Team

Senior career*
Years	Team	Apps	(Gls)
2015	Zeyar Shwe Myay	17	(2)
2016–2020	Shan United	110	(11)
2020–	Yangon United	65	(14)

International career^{‡}
2014–2015	Myanmar U19	15	(1)
2023	Myanmar U23 (Wildcard)	4	(0)
2016–	Myanmar	43	(1)
- * Club domestic league appearances and goals as of 1 November 2023 ‡ National team caps and goals as of 16 Sep 2023

Yan Naing Oo (Burmese: ရန်နိုင်ဦး; born 31 March 1996) is a Burmese footballer who plays as an attacking midfielder or a winger for the Myanmar national football team and Shan United. He was born in North Okkalarpa Township, Yangon Division. He also the key player of Myanmar U-20 National Football Team played in 2015 FIFA U-20 World Cup. He scored the opening goal of 2015 FIFA U-20 World Cup.

== Club career ==
=== Zeyar Shwe Myay ===
Born in North Okkalapa, Yangon, Yan Naing Oo joined Zeyar Shwe Myay's youth setup in 2013, aged 17, after a trial period. He played one season for Zeyar Shwe Myay.

=== Shan United ===
On 2 May 2016, Yan Naing Oo had agreed a deal with MNL big club Shan United for free. He signed a five-year contract with the Shan United side, joining the club after the 2016 MNL half-season.

He scored his first goal for the club on 19 June, netting the first in a 2–0 away win against Yangon United.

== International career ==
On 11 July 2014, Yan Naing Oo was included in the Myanmar under-20 team for the 2014 Hassanal Bolkiah Trophy and 2015 FIFA U-20 World Cup, the latter of which he scored.

== International ==
As of match played 3 January 2023

Appearances and goals by national team and year
National team	Year	Apps	Goals
Myanmar	2016	4	0
Myanmar	2017	7	1
Myanmar	2018	7	0
Myanmar	2019	4	0
Myanmar	2021	7	0
Myanmar	2022	7	0
Myanmar	2023	7	0
Total		43	1

=== International goals ===
Scores and results list Myanmar's goal tally first.

No	Date	Venue	Opponent	Score	Result	Competition
1.	14 November 2017	Fatorda Stadium, Margao, India	India	1–0	2–2	2019 AFC Asian Cup qualification

== Honours ==
Shan United

- Myanmar National League: 2017, 2019; runners-up: 2018
- General Aung San Shield: 2017; runners-up: 2019

Myanmar U20

- Hassanal Bolkiah Trophy: 2014

Myanmar

- Tri-Nation Series (India) runner-up: 2023
