= Thiha Sithu =

Burmese footballer

Personal information
- Full name: Thiha Sithu
- Date of birth: 10 February 1987 (age 39)
- Place of birth: Yangon, Myanmar
- Height: 1.78 m (5 ft 10 in)
- Position: Goalkeeper

Youth career
- 1997–2003: Integrated Training School for Sports and Education
- 2004-2008: Ministry of Commerce FC

Senior career*
Years	Team	Apps	(Gls)
2009–2012	Ayeyawady United	83	(0)
2013–2014	Yadanarbon	45	(0)
2015–2020	Shan United	97	(0)
Total		225	(0)

International career^{‡}
2000	Myanmar U14		
2005	Myanmar U17		
2005	Myanmar U20		
2009–2011	Myanmar U23		
2010–2018	Myanmar	37	(0)
- * Club domestic league appearances and goals ‡ National team caps and goals as of 5 October 2017

Thiha Sithu (Burmese: သီဟစည်သူ) is a Burmese professional football player who plays as a goalkeeper for Shan United FC and Myanmar National Football Team. During his career, he played for Ministry of Commerce, Ayeyawady United and Yadanarbon. Within his 11 years of professional club career life, he contributed his all clubs to win nine champions along with five 1st runner ups. Sithu also set the Myanmar National League clean sheet record by not conceding a single goal for 14 matches in 2017. and he was also winner of 2014 Myanmar National League Best Player award.

Sithu started his international debut for U-14 Myanmar Youth National Team in 2000 and he represented Myanmar Youth National Team U-14, U-17, U-20, U23 and Myanmar National Team from 2000 to 2018. Therefore, he was considered one of the long time starting goalkeepers in Myanmar.

== Honors ==
=== Club ===
Ayeyawaddy United FC

- Myanmar National League: 2010 1st Runner up
- Myanmar National League: 2011 1st Runner up
- MFF Charity Cup: 2012 Champion
- MFF Digicel Cup: 2012 Champion

Yadanabon FC

- Myanmar National League: 2014 Champion
- Myanmar National League: 2015 1st Runner up

Shan United FC

- Myanmar National League: 2017 Champion
- General Aung San Shield: 2017 Champion
- Myanmar National League: 2018 1st Runner up
- MFF Charity Cup: 2019 Champion
- Myanmar National League: 2019 Champion
- General Aung San Shield: 2019 1st Runner up
- MFF Charity Cup: 2020 Champion
- Myanmar National League: 2020 Champion

=== Individual ===
- Myanmar National League: 2011 2nd Best Player Award
- Myanmar National League: 2012 2nd Best Player Award
- Myanmar National League: 2014 Best Player Award
- Myanmar National League: 2017 2nd Best Player Award

=== International ===
- AFF U-20 Youth Championship: 2005 Champion
- U23 SEA Games: 2011 Bronze Medal
- Hassanal Bolkiah Trophy: 2007 1st Runner up
- Philippine Peace Cup: 2014 Champion

== Early life ==
Sithu was born in Ayeyarwady Region and attended Integrated Training School for Sports and Education in 1997 for playing Gymnastics sports. In 1999, he changed to football and started playing as a goalkeeper. From 2004, he joined Ministry of Commerce Football Club.

== Club career ==
=== Ayeyawady United ===
After the Myanmar Football Federation founded the Myanmar National League in 2009, Sithu joined Delta United FC to start his professional career as captain. He played for the team in the AFC Challenge Cup 2010. Sithu was invited to join Yangon United FC in 2010, but rejected the offer to continue playing for Ayeyawady United FC. Together with Ayeyawady United, he was able to achieve two championships, three 1st runner up prizes, and several international appearances in the region.

=== Yadanarbon ===
In 2013, he transferred from Ayeyawady United FC to Yadanarbon FC. He played as the captain and contributed the club to win the Champion of Myanmar National League in 2014 and 1st Runner up in 2015.

=== Shan United ===
==== 2020: League champion and retirement ====
In the beginning of the 2016 transfer window, Thiha Sithu moved to Shan United as the captain again. Sithu helped the club win six champions so far along with two 1st runner up prizes within 4 years as well as Myanmar National League Undefeated Record in 2019. He played for the team the AFC Champions League in 2018 and 2019. He also set the Myanmar National League clean sheet record by not conceding a single goal for 14 matches in 2017. In Jan 2021, Thiha Sithu retired and work as Club Manager at Shan United.

== International career ==
With U-14 Myanmar Youth National Team, Sithu started his international debut in 2000. After that, he represented Myanmar Youth National Team U-17 and U-20 in 2005, U-23 from 2009 to 2011 and Myanmar National Football Team from 2010 to 2018. During all of his career with Myanmar, he achieved two Champions for AFF U-20 Youth Championship in 2005, Philippine Peace Cup in 2014, also 1st Runner up for Hassanal Bolkiah Trophy in 2007 and bronze medal for U23 SEA Games in 2011. Therefore, he was considered as one of the long time starting goalkeeper in Myanmar.

== Outside Football ==
Aside from his professional player-life, Sithu works on sports education and knowledge experiences sharing to youths with a vision of how sports could impact on the society and next generation in Myanmar. He participated in the events such as ONE Championship ONE:NXT Panel Night, Bar Camp for Youth as not only a motivational speaker but also a professional player. He is also the founder of K1 Football Trainer Center in order to teach football techniques, share experiences and encourage the young generation to be a professional player.

With the outbreak of 2021 Myanmar protests against the earlier coup, he, alongside teammates Kyaw Zin Htet and Maung Maung Lwin, joined the protest movement condemning the military's actions.
