= Soe Myat Min =

Burmese footballer

U Soe Myat Min
Personal information
- Date of birth: May 19, 1982 (age 44)
- Place of birth: Yangon, Myanmar
- Height: 1.70 m (5 ft 7 in)
- Position: Striker

Team information
- Current team: Myanmar U19 (manager)

Senior career*
Years	Team	Apps	(Gls)
1998–2002	Finance and Revenue	50	(37)
2002–2010	Kanbawza	86	(27)
Total		136	(64)

International career
2001–2005	Myanmar U23	59	(10)
1998–2008	Myanmar	90	(39)

Managerial career
- 2014–2018: Shan United
- 2019: Myanmar U19
- 2022: Myanmar U19
- * Club domestic league appearances and goals as of 7 December 2017

U Soe Myat Min (Burmese: ဦးစိုးမြတ်မင်း, pronounced [só mjaʔ mɪ́ɰ̃]; born 19 May 1982) is a former Burmese footballer. He played for the Myanmar national team and spent the majority of his club career at Kanbawza. Making his debut for the national team since 1998, he was made captain for the 2002 Tiger Cup.

== Playing career ==
Soe also played a key role for Myanmar at the 2004 AFF Championship, helping them qualify for the semi-finals. He himself finished the tournament as joint second top scorer of the tournament with six goals and was included in the tournament's best XI.

Soe also helped Myanmar win their fourth Merdeka Cup championship in 2006 and was named Most Valuable Player of the tournament. Soe Myat Min was injured during training for the 2007 AFF Championship, and did not play in the group matches. Myanmar did not qualify for the semi-finals.

The Burmese star was also featured in the 2008 AFC Challenge Cup and scored a goal against Nepal.

Soe Myat Min helped Myanmar win the 2008 Myanmar Grand Royal Challenge Cup. by scoring a hat-trick against Malaysia in the semi-finals and both goals in the 2–1 win over Indonesia in the final. Soe Myat Min became the selected player of the Myanmar U-16 soccer team in 1998. He played over 60 international matches, scoring 19 goals for the country. Soe is also the all time Second top scorer of Myanmar as of the Myanmar Football Federation.

== International goals ==
#	Date	Venue	Opponent	Score	Result	Competition
1	5 April 2000	Dongdaemun Stadium, Seoul	Mongolia	1–0	2–0	2000 AFC Asian Cup qualification
2	10 October 2003	Bukit Jalil Stadium, Kuala Lumpur	Bahrain	1–3	1–3	2004 AFC Asian Cup qualification
3	24 October 2003	Bahrain National Stadium, Riffa	Malaysia	1–0	2–1	2004 AFC Asian Cup qualification
4	12 December 2004	Bukit Jalil Stadium, Kuala Lumpur	Malaysia	1–0	1–0	2004 AFF Championship
5	16 December 2004	Bukit Jalil Stadium, Kuala Lumpur	Timor-Leste	1–0	3–1	2004 AFF Championship
6	29 December 2004	KLFA Stadium, Cheras	Singapore	1–1	3–4	2004 AFF Championship
7	29 December 2004	KLFA Stadium, Cheras	Singapore	3–4	3–4	2004 AFF Championship
8	2 January 2005	National Stadium, Singapore	Singapore	1–0	2–4	2004 AFF Championship
9	27 August 2006	Shah Alam Stadium, Shah Alam	Malaysia	2–1	2–1	2006 Merdeka Tournament
10	29 August 2006	Shah Alam Stadium, Shah Alam	Indonesia	2–0	2–1	2006 Merdeka Tournament
11	20 August 2007	MBPJ Stadium, Petaling Jaya	Lesotho	1–0	1–0	2007 Merdeka Tournament
12	31 July 2008	Gachibowli Athletic Stadium, Hyderabad	Nepal	3–0	3–0	2008 AFC Challenge Cup
13	2 August 2008	Gachibowli Athletic Stadium, Hyderabad	Sri Lanka	1–0	3–1	2008 AFC Challenge Cup
14	22 August 2008	Gelora Bung Karno Stadium, Jakarta	Cambodia	3–1	7–1	Independence Cup 2008
15	18 November 2008	Thuwunna Stadium, Yangon	Malaysia	1–0	4–1	2008 Myanmar Grand Royal Challenge Cup
16	18 November 2008	Thuwunna Stadium, Yangon	Malaysia	2–0	4–1	2008 Myanmar Grand Royal Challenge Cup
17	18 November 2008	Thuwunna Stadium, Yangon	Malaysia	3–1	4–1	2008 Myanmar Grand Royal Challenge Cup
18	21 November 2008	Thuwunna Stadium, Yangon	Indonesia	1–0	2–1	2008 Myanmar Grand Royal Challenge Cup
19	21 November 2008	Thuwunna Stadium, Yangon	Indonesia	2–1	2–1	2008 Myanmar Grand Royal Challenge Cup

== Honours ==
=== As player ===
==== Myanmar ====
- Merdeka Tournament: 2006
- Myanmar Grand Royal Challenge Cup: 2008

=== As manager ===
==== Shan United ====
- General Aung San Shield: 2017
