= Hein Thiha Zaw =

Burmese footballer

Personal information
- Full name: Hein Thiha Zaw
- Date of birth: 1 August 1995 (age 31)
- Place of birth: Yangon, Myanmar
- Height: 1.59 m (5 ft 2 1/2 in)
- Position: Left back

Team information
- Current team: Shan United
- Number: 5

Senior career*
Years	Team	Apps	(Gls)
2009–2013	Yadanarbon	27	(0)
2013–2015	Ayeyawady United	42	(0)
2015–	Shan United	124	(1)

International career^{‡}
2015–2017	Myanmar U23	5	(0)
2015–	Myanmar	7	(0)
- * Club domestic league appearances and goals as of 25 October 2023 ‡ National team caps and goals as of 6 June 2016

Hein Thiha Zaw (Burmese: ဟိန်းသီဟဇော် born 1 August 1995) is a Burmese footballer who plays as a left back where he captains the Myanmar National League club Ayeyawady United.

== Club career ==
On 13 April in a 2013 AFC Cup game against Vietnamese club SHB Đà Nẵng, Hein conceded a last minute penalty and was red carded in the last minute of the game. Nguyễn Minh Phương scored the penalty kick to wing the game 3–2. Hein's teammate Phyo Ko Ko Thein was also sent off minutes earlier in the same game.

In the 2015 AFC Cup group stage, Hein sent off with a quarter of an hour to play against Maldives club New Radiant, in an eventual scoreless draw.

== International career ==
Hein is known to have a poor disciplinary record, in his under-21 debut against Malaysia U21 in 2013, he was also sent off in the first half.

Hein Thiha Zaw made his senior debut in a friendly match against Hong Kong on 7 November 2015.

== Honours ==
Myanmar

- Tri-Nation Series runner-up: 2023

Ayeyawady United

- MFF Cup: 2014
- General Aung San Shield: 2015

Shan United

- Myanmar National League: 2017, 2019, 2020, 2022; runner-up: 2018
- General Aung San Shield: 2017; runner-up: 2019
