= Win Min Htut =

Burmese footballer

Personal information
- Full name: Win Min Htut
- Date of birth: April 6, 1986 (age 40)
- Place of birth: Twante, Myanmar
- Height: 1.70 m (5 ft 7 in)
- Position: Centre back

Senior career*
Years	Team	Apps	(Gls)
2004–2008	Ministry of Transport	75	(0)
2009–2018	Shan United	194	(0)
2018–2020	Southern Myanmar Football Club	16	(2)
Total		285	(2)

International career^{‡}
2009–2018	Myanmar	30	(0)
- * Club domestic league appearances and goals ‡ National team caps and goals as of 27 March 2018

Win Min Htut (born 6 April 1986) is a footballer from Myanmar. He made his first appearance for the Myanmar national football team in 2009.
