= Soe Min Oo =

Burmese footballer

Personal information
- Date of birth: 8 March 1988 (age 38)
- Place of birth: Taungtha, Burma
- Height: 1.71 m (5 ft 7 in)
- Position: Striker

Youth career
- 2004: Mandalay Institute of Sports

Senior career*
Years	Team	Apps	(Gls)
2004–2005	Da Gun FC (MPL)	30	(7)
2006–2007	YDC FC (MPL)	15	(6)
2007–2009	Kanbawza (MPL)	45	(19)
2009–2019	Shan United	174	(109)

International career^{‡}
2004	Myanmar U-16		
2009	Myanmar U-23		
2010–	Myanmar	14	(3)
Medal record
Men's football
Representing Myanmar
Philippine Peace Cup
Gold medal – first place	2014 Philippines
- * Club domestic league appearances and goals as of 25 October 2023 ‡ National team caps and goals as of 6 April 2016

Soe Min Oo (Burmese: စိုးမင်းဦး; born 8 March 1988) is a Burmese footballer who plays for the Myanmar national football team and Myawady of Myanmar National League.

As a secondary school student, Soe played in Student football competitions. In 2004, he went to Mandalay Institute of Sports and was chosen for Myanmar U-16 on the same year. He then played for Da Gun FC of Myanmar Premier League between 2004 and 2005 season. After Da Gun FC was dissolved in 2006, Soe Min Oo moved to YCDC FC. From 2007 onwards, he has been playing for the current club, Kanbawza where he remains until now. In 2009 when Myanmar went into professional football to replace out-of-favour MPL, Soe remains with Kanbawza despite many interests from clubs around the country. Soe Min Oo was the top scorer in 2009 AFC President's Cup. On 3 April 2016, he scores his 100th goal in Myanmar National League to become the first local player and second overall (after César Augusto) to reach this statistic.

== International goals ==
#	Date	Venue	Opponent	Score	Result	Competition
1	2 March 2013	Thuwunna Stadium, Yangon	Guam	1–0	5–0	2014 AFC Challenge Cup qualification
2	6 March 2013	Thuwunna Stadium, Yangon	India	1–0	1–0	2014 AFC Challenge Cup qualification
3	6 September 2014	Rizal Memorial Stadium, Manila	Philippines	3–2	3–2	2014 Philippine Peace Cup

== Honours ==
Shan United

- Myanmar National League: 2017

Individual

- Myanmar National League All-time Top Scorer : 2nd
- Myanmar National League Top Scorer: 2009
- ASEAN All-Stars: 2014
