= Myo Min Latt =

Burmese footballer

Personal information
- Full name: Myo Min Latt
- Date of birth: 20 February 1995 (age 31)
- Place of birth: North Dagon, Myanmar
- Height: 1.82 m (5 ft 11 1/2 in)
- Position: Goalkeeper

Team information
- Current team: VUE Naypyitaw
- Number: 13

Youth career
- 2007–2011: Yangon Institute of Sports

Senior career*
| Years | Team | Apps | (Gls) |
| 2011–2014 | Zeyar Shwe Myay | 40 | (0) |
| 2015–2016 | Kanbawza | 8 | (0) |
| 2016–2022 | Shan United | 70 | (0) |
| 2022–2023 | Ratchaburi | 0 | (0) |
| 2023 | Police Tero | 0 | (0) |
| 2023 | Shan United | 2 | (0) |
| 2024–2026 | Dagon Port | | |
| 2026– | VUE Naypyitaw | | |

International career^{‡}
| 2012–2015 | Myanmar U-20 | 20 | (0) |
| 2013– | Myanmar | 14 | (0) |
- * Club domestic league appearances and goals as of 25 October 2023 ‡ National team caps and goals as of 3 June 2023

Myo Min Latt (Burmese: မျိုးမင်းလတ်; born 20 February 1995) is a Burmese professional footballer who plays as a goalkeeper for Police Tero and the Myanmar national team.

== International career ==
As of match played 30 December 2022

Appearances and goals by national team and year
| National team | Year | Apps | Goals |
|---|---|---|---|
| Myanmar | 2013 | 1 | 0 |
| Myanmar | 2015 | 2 | 0 |
| Myanmar | 2021 | 7 | 0 |
| Myanmar | 2022 | 4 | 0 |
| Total | | 14 | 0 |

== Honours ==
Shan United

- Myanmar National League: 2017, 2019, 2020, 2022; runner-up: 2018
- General Aung San Shield: 2017; runner-up: 2019
