= Taunggyi Stadium =

Multi-use stadium in Taunggyi, Myanmar

Coordinates: 20°46′42″N 97°02′16″E

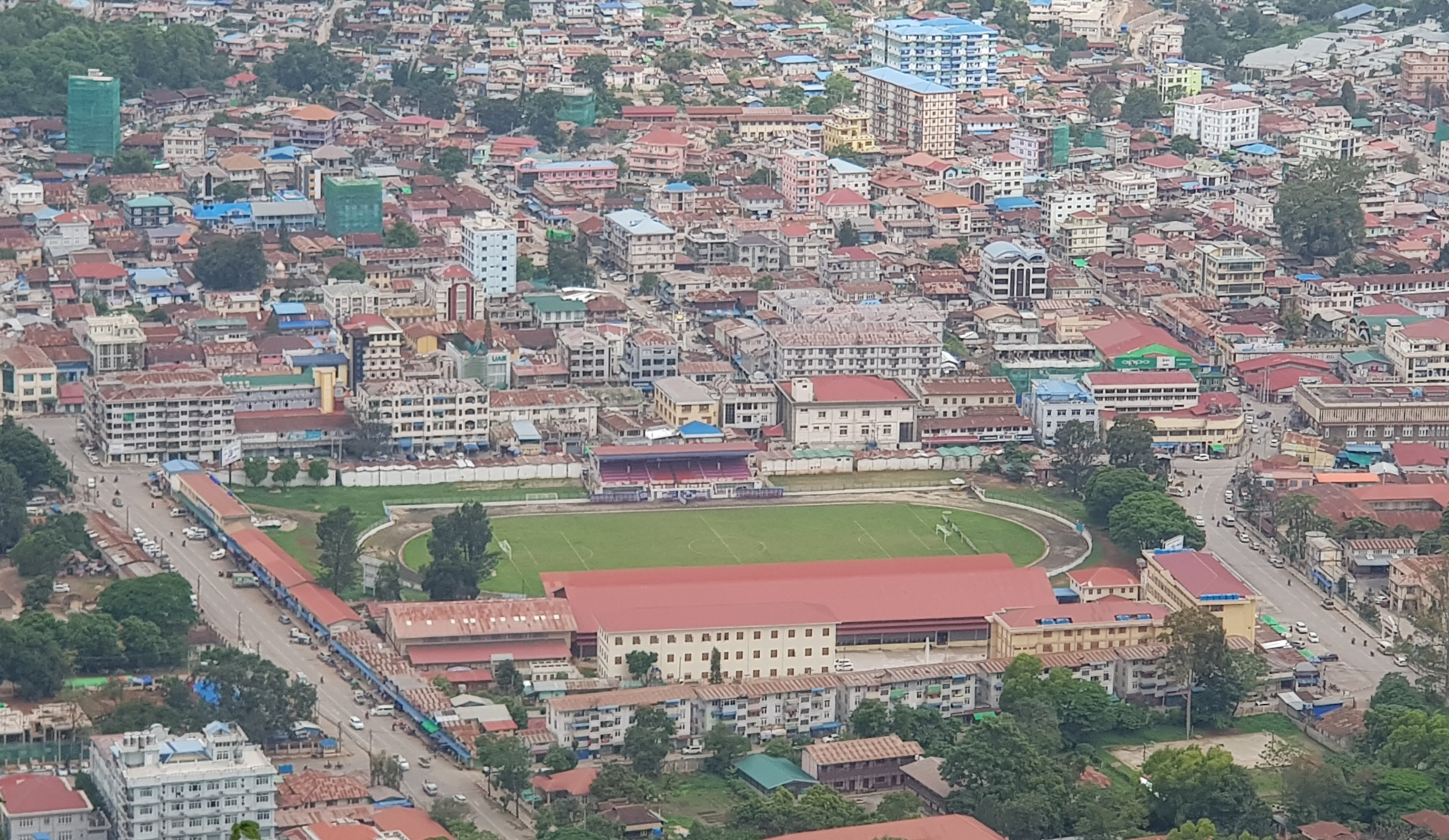
- Interactive map of Taunggyi Stadium
- Full name: Taunggyi Stadium
- Location: Taunggyi, Myanmar
- Operator: Shan United F.C.
- Capacity: 7,000
- Surface: Grass

Construction
- Opened: 2012

Tenant
- Shan United F.C. (2012-present)

Taunggyi Stadium is a multi-use stadium in Taunggyi, Myanmar. It is currently used mostly for football matches and is the home ground of Shan United F.C. of the Myanmar National League. The stadium has a capacity of 7,000 spectators.

Construction began during the 2019-2020 fiscal year by the government of Myanmar which was estimated to cost more than 200 million kyat (more than US$155,000) to finish.
