= Htike Htike Aung =

Burmese footballer

Personal information
- Full name: Htike Htike Aung
- Date of birth: 1 February 1995 (age 31)
- Place of birth: Myanmar
- Height: 1.68 m (5 ft 6 in)
- Position: Defender

Youth career
- 2010–2013: Ayeyawady United Youth Club

Senior career*
Years	Team	Apps	(Gls)
2013–2015	Ayeyawady United	6	(0)
2015–2019	Shan United	67	(3)
2019–2020	Yangon United		
2022–	Mahar United		

International career^{‡}
2011	Myanmar U-16	4	(0)
2013–2014	Myanmar U-19	12	(2)
2018–	Myanmar	6	(0)
- * Club domestic league appearances and goals as of 30 May 2018 ‡ National team caps and goals as of 1 October 2017

Htike Htike Aung (Burmese: ထိုက်ထိုက်အောင်; was born 1 February 1995, in Myanmar) is a footballer from Burma, and a defender for the Myanmar under-20 football team and Yangon United. He can play center back and right full back.

In 2019, Yangon United signed Htike Htike Aung. He played in Myanmar U-20 national team for 2015 FIFA U-20 World Cup in New Zealand.

Htike Htike Aung,Mahar United player, announced his retirement because of spine injury in April 2025.

== Honours ==
- Hassanal Bolkiah Trophy: 2014
- 2015 General Aung San Shield:Champion
