= 2018 AFF Championship Group A =

Group A was one of the two groups of the 2018 AFF Championship. It consisted of Vietnam, Malaysia, Myanmar, Cambodia and Laos. The matches were played from 8 to 24 November 2018.

== Teams ==
Draw position	Team	Appearance	Previous best performance	FIFA World Rankings (as of 25 October)
A1	Vietnam	12th	Winners (2008)	102
A2	Malaysia	12th	Winners (2010)	169
A3	Myanmar	12th	Fourth place (2004), Semi-finalists (2016)	141
A4	Cambodia	7th	Group stage (1996, 2000, 2002, 2004, 2008, 2016)	170
A5	Laos	11th	Group stage (1996 to 2014)	181

== Group standings ==
Pos	Team	Pld	W	D	L	GF	GA	GD	Pts	Qualification
1	Vietnam	4	3	1	0	8	0	+8	10	Knockout phase
2	Malaysia	4	3	0	1	7	3	+4	9	Knockout phase
3	Myanmar	4	2	1	1	7	5	+2	7	
4	Cambodia	4	1	0	3	4	9	−5	3	
5	Laos	4	0	0	4	3	12	−9	0	

Source: AFF

In the semi-finals:

- Vietnam advanced to play against Philippines (runners-up of Group B).
- Malaysia advanced to play against Thailand (winners of Group B).

== Matches ==
=== Cambodia vs Malaysia ===
8 November 2018
18:30 UTC+7

Cambodia	0–1	Malaysia
	Report (AFFSZ); Report (AFF)	Norshahrul 31'

Olympic Stadium, Phnom Penh
Attendance: 34,250
Referee: Ahmad A'qashah (Singapore)

Cambodia	Malaysia

GK	22	Um Vichet
RB	4	Sareth Krya
CB	25	Hong Pheng	(yellow card) 88'
CB	5	Soeuy Visal (c)
LB	19	Cheng Meng		(substituted off) 73'
DM	10	Kouch Sokumpheak
RM	20	Brak Thiva
LM	11	Chan Vathanaka
AM	12	Sos Suhana		(substituted off) 75'
CF	14	Reung Bunheing
CF	9	Keo Sokpheng		(substituted off) 46'
Substitutions:
MF	23	Thierry Chantha Bin		(substituted in) 46'
DF	2	Sath Rosib		(substituted in) 73'
MF	24	Kouch Dani		(substituted in) 75'
Manager:
(Argentina) Félix Dalmás

GK	22	Khairul Fahmi Che Mat
RB	4	Syahmi Safari
CB	7	Aidil Zafuan Radzak
CB	3	Shahrul Saad
LB	6	Syazwan Andik
RM	13	Mohamadou Sumareh
CM	14	Syamer Kutty Abba
CM	12	Akram Mahinan		(substituted off) 86'
LM	11	Safawi Rasid
CF	8	Zaquan Adha Radzak (c)	(yellow card) 65'	(substituted off) 71'
CF	9	Norshahrul Idlan Talaha		(substituted off) 63'
Substitutions:
MF	10	Shahrel Fikri		(substituted in) 63'
FW	20	Hazwan Bakri		(substituted in) 71'
DF	17	Irfan Zakaria		(substituted in) 86'
Manager:
Tan Cheng Hoe

Man of the Match:
Norshahrul Idlan Talaha (Malaysia)

Assistant referees:
Lim Kok Heng (Singapore)
Abdul Hannan Hasim (Singapore)
Fourth official:
Letchman Gopalakrishnan (Singapore)

Overall
Statistics	Cambodia	Malaysia
Goals scored	0	1
Total shots	10	13
Shots on target	1	3
Ball possession	47%	53%
Corner kicks	2	5
Fouls committed	12	16
Offsides	4	1
Yellow cards	1	1
Red cards	0	0

=== Laos vs Vietnam ===
8 November 2018
19:30 UTC+7

Laos	0–3	Vietnam
	Report (AFFSZ); Report (AFF)	Nguyễn Công Phượng 11'; Nguyễn Anh Đức 45+2'; Nguyễn Quang Hải 68'

New Laos National Stadium, Vientiane
Attendance: 15,000
Referee: Thoriq Munir Alkatiri (Indonesia)

Laos	Vietnam

GK	1	Saymanolinh Paseuth
RB	13	Aphixay Thanakhanty
CB	6	Thothilath Sibounhuang (c)
CB	15	Sonevilay Sihavong	(substituted off) 46'
LB	3	Kaharn Phetsivilay
DM	10	Chanthaphone Waenvongsoth
CM	23	Phouthone Innalay	(substituted off) 90+2'
CM	17	Bounphachan Bounkong
RF	4	Lathasay Lounlasy
CF	9	Soukchinda Natphasouk	(substituted off) 82'
LF	22	Phithack Kongmathilath
Substitutions:
DF	2	Vanna Bounlovongsa	(substituted in) 46'
FW	20	Somxay Keohanam	(substituted in) 82'
MF	21	Tiny Bounmalay	(substituted in) 90+2'
Manager:
(Singapore) V. Sundramoorthy

GK	23	Đặng Văn Lâm
CB	28	Đỗ Duy Mạnh
CB	21	Trần Đình Trọng
CB	3	Quế Ngọc Hải
RWB	8	Nguyễn Trọng Hoàng
LWB	5	Đoàn Văn Hậu	(yellow card) 28'	(substituted off) 46'
CM	19	Nguyễn Quang Hải
CM	6	Lương Xuân Trường
CM	14	Nguyễn Công Phượng
CF	10	Nguyễn Văn Quyết (c)		(substituted off) 63'
CF	11	Nguyễn Anh Đức		(substituted off) 71'
Substitutions:
FW	20	Phan Văn Đức		(substituted in) 46'
MF	16	Đỗ Hùng Dũng		(substituted in) 63'
FW	22	Nguyễn Tiến Linh		(substituted in) 71'
Manager:
(South Korea) Park Hang-seo

Man of the Match:
Nguyễn Công Phượng (Vietnam)

Assistant referees:
Malang Nurhadi (Indonesia)
Bambang Syamsudar (Indonesia)
Fourth official:
Mongkolchai Pechsri (Thailand)

Overall
Statistics	Laos	Vietnam
Goals scored	0	3
Total shots	3	11
Shots on target	1	6
Ball possession	16%	84%
Corner kicks	0	6
Fouls committed	2	5
Offsides	0	0
Yellow cards	0	1
Red cards	0	0

=== Malaysia vs Laos ===
12 November 2018
20:45 UTC+8

Malaysia	3–1	Laos
Zaquan 15'; Norshahrul 86', 90+2'	Report (AFFSZ); Report (AFF)	Phithack 7'

Bukit Jalil National Stadium, Kuala Lumpur
Attendance: 12,127
Referee: Sivakorn Pu-udom (Thailand)

Malaysia	Laos

GK	22	Khairul Fahmi Che Mat
RB	4	Syahmi Safari
CB	7	Aidil Zafuan Radzak
CB	3	Shahrul Saad
LB	6	Syazwan Andik
RM	11	Safawi Rasid		(substituted off) 62'
CM	18	Syafiq Ahmad		(substituted off) 62'
CM	12	Akram Mahinan
LM	16	Syazwan Zainon		(substituted off) 46'
CF	8	Zaquan Adha Radzak (c)
CF	9	Norshahrul Idlan Talaha	(yellow card) 60'
Substitutions:
MF	19	Akhyar Rashid		(substituted in) 46'
FW	20	Hazwan Bakri		(substituted in) 62'
FW	10	Shahrel Fikri		(substituted in) 62'
Manager:
Tan Cheng Hoe

GK	12	Outthilath Nammakhoth	(yellow card) 64'
RB	7	Soukaphone Vongchiengkham
CB	13	Aphixay Thanakhanty
CB	3	Kaharn Phetsivilay
LB	10	Chanthaphone Waenvongsoth	(yellow card) 25'	(substituted off) 69'
CM	23	Phouthone Innalay		(substituted off) 82'
CM	17	Bounphachan Bounkong
RW	4	Lathasay Lounlasy
AM	22	Phithack Kongmathilath		(substituted off) 85'
LW	2	Vanna Bounlovongsa
CF	6	Thothilath Sibounhuang (c)	(yellow card) 52'
Substitutions:
FW	20	Somxay Keohanam		(substituted in) 69'
DF	19	Kittisak Phomvongsa		(substituted in) 82'
FW	9	Soukchinda Natphasouk		(substituted in) 85'
Manager:
(Singapore) V. Sundramoorthy

Man of the Match:
Norshahrul Idlan Talaha (Malaysia)

Assistant referees:
Thanet Chucheun (Thailand)
Pattarapong Kijsathit (Thailand)
Fourth official:
Wiwat Jumpao-on (Thailand)

Overall
Statistics	Malaysia	Laos
Goals scored	3	1
Total shots	31	6
Shots on target	11	3
Ball possession	82%	18%
Corner kicks	17	0
Fouls committed	7	11
Offsides	1	1
Yellow cards	1	4
Red cards	0	0

=== Myanmar vs Cambodia ===
12 November 2018
18:00 UTC+6:30

Myanmar	4–1	Cambodia
Hlaing Bo Bo 60', 90+3'; Than Htet Aung 70'; Sithu Aung 87'	Report (AFFSZ); Report (AFF)	Vathanaka 23'

Mandalarthiri Stadium, Mandalay
Attendance: 26,946
Referee: Clifford Daypuyat (Philippines)

Myanmar	Cambodia

GK	1	Kyaw Zin Htet (c)
RB	4	David Htan
CB	27	Pyae Phyo Zaw
CB	32	Zaw Min Tun
LB	3	Thein Than Win	(yellow card) 83'
DM	6	Hlaing Bo Bo
RM	11	Maung Maung Lwin
CM	26	Lwin Moe Aung		(substituted off) 80'
CM	14	Yan Naing Oo		(substituted off) 45'
LM	16	Sithu Aung
CF	9	Zin Min Tun		(substituted off) 63'
Substitutions:
FW	10	Aung Thu		(substituted in) 45'
MF	20	Than Htet Aung		(substituted in) 63'
MF	7	Ye Ko Oo	(yellow card) 90+1'	(substituted in) 80'
Manager:
(Germany) Antoine Hey

GK	21	Keo Soksela
RB	4	Sareth Krya
CB	25	Hong Pheng
CB	5	Soeuy Visal (c)	(yellow card) 67'
LB	2	Sath Rosib
CM	10	Kouch Sokumpheak
CM	23	Thierry Chantha Bin
RW	20	Brak Thiva		(substituted off) 72'
AM	12	Sos Suhana		(substituted off) 61'
LW	11	Chan Vathanaka		(substituted off) 46'
CF	14	Reung Bunheing
Substitutions:
FW	17	Chhin Chhoeun		(substituted in) 46'
FW	7	Prak Mony Udom		(substituted in) 61'
FW	9	Keo Sokpheng		(substituted in) 72'
Manager:
(Argentina) Félix Dalmás

Man of the Match:
Hlaing Bo Bo (Myanmar)

Assistant referees:
Krizmark Nanola (Philippines)
Ali Faisal Rosli (Brunei)
Fourth official:
Oki Dwi Putra (Indonesia)

Overall
Statistics	Myanmar	Cambodia
Goals scored	4	1
Total shots	23	12
Shots on target	10	7
Ball possession	60%	40%
Corner kicks	8	4
Fouls committed	9	8
Offsides	7	0
Yellow cards	2	1
Red cards	0	0

=== Laos vs Myanmar ===
16 November 2018
19:30 UTC+7

Laos	1–3	Myanmar
Phouthone 14'	Report (AFFSZ); Report (AFF)	Aung Thu 45'; Htet Phyoe Wai 72'; Maung Maung Lwin 84'

New Laos National Stadium, Vientiane
Attendance: 1,294
Referee: Kim Hee-gon (South Korea)

Laos	Myanmar

GK	12	Outthilath Nammakhoth
RB	7	Soukaphone Vongchiengkham	(yellow card) 45+2'
CB	13	Aphixay Thanakhanty
CB	3	Kaharn Phetsivilay
LB	10	Chanthaphone Waenvongsoth		(substituted off) 80'
CM	23	Phouthone Innalay
CM	17	Bounphachan Bounkong		(substituted off) 46'
RW	4	Lathasay Lounlasy
AM	22	Phithack Kongmathilath		(substituted off) 70'
LW	2	Vanna Bounlovongsa
CF	6	Thothilath Sibounhuang (c)
Substitutions:
FW	20	Somxay Keohanam		(substituted in) 46'
MF	8	Phathana Phommathep		(substituted in) 70'
DF	19	Kittisak Phomvongsa		(substituted in) 80'
Manager:
(Singapore) V. Sundramoorthy

GK	1	Kyaw Zin Htet (c)
RB	4	David Htan
CB	27	Pyae Phyo Zaw	(yellow card) 22'
CB	32	Zaw Min Tun
LB	3	Thein Than Win	(yellow card) 34'
DM	6	Hlaing Bo Bo
RM	11	Maung Maung Lwin
CM	26	Lwin Moe Aung		(substituted off) 53'
CM	10	Aung Thu
LM	21	Aee Soe		(substituted off) 42'
CF	20	Than Htet Aung		(substituted off) 64'
Substitutions:
MF	19	Htet Phyoe Wai		(substituted in) 42'
MF	8	Maung Maung Soe		(substituted in) 53'
MF	9	Zin Min Tun		(substituted in) 64'
Manager:
(Germany) Antoine Hey

Man of the Match:
David Htan (Myanmar)

Assistant referees:
Relly Balila (Philippines)
Dinan Lazuardi (Indonesia)
Fourth official:
Abdul Hakim Haidi (Brunei)

Overall
Statistics	Laos	Myanmar
Goals scored	1	3
Total shots	18	19
Shots on target	4	8
Ball possession	31%	69%
Corner kicks	4	10
Fouls committed	9	15
Offsides	8	4
Yellow cards	1	2
Red cards	0	0

=== Vietnam vs Malaysia ===
16 November 2018
19:30 UTC+7

Vietnam	2–0	Malaysia
Nguyễn Công Phượng 11'; Nguyễn Anh Đức 60'	Report (AFFSZ); Report (AFF)

Mỹ Đình National Stadium, Hanoi
Attendance: 40,000
Referee: Turki Al-Khudayr (Saudi Arabia)

Vietnam	Malaysia

GK	23	Đặng Văn Lâm
CB	28	Đỗ Duy Mạnh
CB	21	Trần Đình Trọng
CB	3	Quế Ngọc Hải (c)
RWB	8	Nguyễn Trọng Hoàng
LWB	5	Đoàn Văn Hậu
CM	6	Lương Xuân Trường	(substituted off) 87'
CM	19	Nguyễn Quang Hải
RW	14	Nguyễn Công Phượng	(substituted off) 74'
LW	20	Phan Văn Đức	(substituted off) 73'
CF	11	Nguyễn Anh Đức
Substitutions:
MF	16	Đỗ Hùng Dũng	(substituted in) 73'
FW	10	Nguyễn Văn Quyết	(substituted in) 74'
MF	15	Phạm Đức Huy	(substituted in) 87'
Manager:
(South Korea) Park Hang-seo

GK	22	Khairul Fahmi Che Mat (c)
RB	4	Syahmi Safari
CB	7	Aidil Zafuan Radzak
CB	3	Shahrul Saad	(yellow card) 72'
LB	6	Syazwan Andik
RM	13	Mohamadou Sumareh		(substituted off) 58'
CM	12	Akram Mahinan
CM	14	Syamer Kutty Abba	(yellow card) 13'	(substituted off) 72'
LM	19	Akhyar Rashid
CF	10	Shahrel Fikri		(substituted off) 62'
CF	9	Norshahrul Idlan Talaha
Substitutions:
MF	11	Safawi Rasid		(substituted in) 58'
FW	20	Hazwan Bakri		(substituted in) 62'
FW	18	Syafiq Ahmad		(substituted in) 72'
Manager:
Tan Cheng Hoe

Man of the Match:
Nguyễn Anh Đức (Vietnam)

Assistant referees:
Phulsawat Samransuk (Thailand)
Komsun Khumpan (Thailand)
Fourth official:
Steve Supresencia (Philippines)

Overall
Statistics	Vietnam	Malaysia
Goals scored	2	0
Total shots	8	7
Shots on target	4	2
Ball possession	31%	69%
Corner kicks	1	4
Fouls committed	15	15
Offsides	4	1
Yellow cards	0	2
Red cards	0	0

=== Myanmar vs Vietnam ===
20 November 2018
18:00 UTC+6:30

Myanmar	0–0	Vietnam
	Report (AFFSZ); Report (AFF)

Mandalarthiri Stadium, Mandalay
Attendance: 29,954
Referee: Khamis Al-Marri (Qatar)

Myanmar	Vietnam

GK	1	Kyaw Zin Htet
RB	24	Win Moe Kyaw
CB	32	Zaw Min Tun (c)
CB	15	Soe Moe Kyaw
LB	5	Nanda Kyaw
DM	6	Hlaing Bo Bo	(yellow card) 44'
RM	11	Maung Maung Lwin
CM	19	Htet Phyoe Wai		(substituted off) 56'
CM	26	Lwin Moe Aung	(yellow card) 63'	(substituted off) 81'
LM	16	Sithu Aung		(substituted off) 74'
CF	10	Aung Thu
Substitutions:
MF	20	Than Htet Aung		(substituted in) 56'
MF	14	Yan Naing Oo		(substituted in) 74'
MF	7	Ye Ko Oo		(substituted in) 81'
Manager:
(Germany) Antoine Hey

GK	23	Đặng Văn Lâm
CB	28	Đỗ Duy Mạnh
CB	21	Trần Đình Trọng
CB	3	Quế Ngọc Hải (c)	(yellow card) 44'
RWB	20	Phan Văn Đức
LWB	5	Đoàn Văn Hậu
CM	19	Nguyễn Quang Hải
CM	6	Lương Xuân Trường		(substituted off) 45'
RW	14	Nguyễn Công Phượng		(substituted off) 76'
LW	10	Nguyễn Văn Quyết		(substituted off) 45'
CF	11	Nguyễn Anh Đức
Substitutions:
MF	8	Nguyễn Trọng Hoàng		(substituted in) 45'
MF	16	Đỗ Hùng Dũng		(substituted in) 45'
FW	9	Nguyễn Văn Toàn		(substituted in) 76'
Manager:
(South Korea) Park Hang-seo

Man of the Match:
Hlaing Bo Bo (Myanmar)

Assistant referees:
Taleb Salem Al-Marri (Qatar)
Phubes Lekpha (Thailand)
Fourth official:
Titichai Nuanchan (Thailand)

Overall
Statistics	Myanmar	Vietnam
Goals scored	0	0
Total shots	10	15
Shots on target	2	5
Ball possession	53%	47%
Corner kicks	3	5
Fouls committed	10	6
Offsides	1	3
Yellow cards	2	1
Red cards	0	0

=== Cambodia vs Laos ===
20 November 2018
18:30 UTC+7

Cambodia	3–1	Laos
Vathanaka 17'; Mony Udom 35' (pen.); Sokpheng 76'	Report (AFFSZ); Report (AFF)	Somxay 75'

Olympic Stadium, Phnom Penh
Attendance: 25,085
Referee: Nathan Chan (Singapore)

Cambodia	Laos

GK	22	Um Vichet
RB	4	Sareth Krya		(substituted off) 55'
CB	25	Hong Pheng		(substituted off) 69'
CB	5	Soeuy Visal (c)
LB	2	Sath Rosib
CM	10	Kouch Sokumpheak
CM	8	Orn Chanpolin		(substituted off) 80'
RW	7	Prak Mony Udom
AM	12	Sos Suhana
LW	11	Chan Vathanaka
CF	9	Keo Sokpheng
Substitutions:
DF	19	Cheng Meng	(yellow card) 62'	(substituted in) 55'
DF	18	Sor Piseth		(substituted in) 69'
MF	24	Kouch Dani		(substituted in) 80'
Manager:
(Argentina) Félix Dalmás

GK	1	Saymanolinh Paseuth
RB	23	Phouthone Innalay
CB	13	Aphixay Thanakhanty
CB	3	Kaharn Phetsivilay
LB	2	Vanna Bounlovongsa
CM	6	Thothilath Sibounhuang (c)
CM	5	Thinnakone Vongsa
RW	4	Lathasay Lounlasy		(substituted off) 84'
AM	8	Phathana Phommathep		(substituted off) 45'
LW	22	Phithack Kongmathilath
CF	20	Somxay Keohanam
Substitutions:
FW	11	Chansamone Phommalivong	(yellow card) 59'	(substituted in) 45' (substituted off) 65'
FW	16	Thatsaphone Saysouk		(substituted in) 65'
MF	10	Chanthaphone Waenvongsoth		(substituted in) 84'
Manager:
(Singapore) V. Sundramoorthy

Man of the Match:
Sos Suhana (Cambodia)

Assistant referees:
Raffizal Ramli (Brunei)
Komsun Khumpan (Thailand)
Fourth official:
Letchman Gopalakrishnan (Singapore)

Overall
Statistics	Cambodia	Laos
Goals scored	3	1
Total shots	14	6
Shots on target	6	1
Ball possession	78%	22%
Corner kicks	5	2
Fouls committed	16	14
Offsides	4	1
Yellow cards	1	1
Red cards	0	0

=== Vietnam vs Cambodia ===
24 November 2018
19:30 UTC+7

Vietnam	3–0	Cambodia
Nguyễn Tiến Linh 39'; Nguyễn Quang Hải 41'; Phan Văn Đức 61'	Report (AFFSZ); Report (AFF)

Hàng Đẫy Stadium, Hanoi
Attendance: 14,000
Referee: Ma Ning (China)

Vietnam	Cambodia

GK	23	Đặng Văn Lâm
CB	28	Đỗ Duy Mạnh
CB	21	Trần Đình Trọng
CB	3	Quế Ngọc Hải (c)		(substituted off) 82'
RM	8	Nguyễn Trọng Hoàng	(yellow card) 31'	(substituted off) 65'
CM	19	Nguyễn Quang Hải
CM	15	Phạm Đức Huy
CM	16	Đỗ Hùng Dũng
LM	12	Nguyễn Phong Hồng Duy
CF	20	Phan Văn Đức		(substituted off) 70'
CF	22	Nguyễn Tiến Linh
Substitutions:
MF	14	Nguyễn Công Phượng		(substituted in) 65'
FW	10	Nguyễn Văn Quyết		(substituted in) 70'
DF	4	Bùi Tiến Dũng		(substituted in) 82'
Manager:
(South Korea) Park Hang-seo

GK	22	Um Vichet
RB	17	Chhin Chhoeun
CB	25	Hong Pheng	(yellow card) 3'
CB	5	Soeuy Visal (c)
LB	19	Cheng Meng
CM	10	Kouch Sokumpheak		(substituted off) 85'
CM	8	Orn Chanpolin	(yellow card) 37'	(substituted off) 67'
RW	20	Brak Thiva		(substituted off) 66'
AM	12	Sos Suhana
LW	16	Sin Kakada
CF	14	Reung Bunheing	(yellow card) 90+4'
Substitutions:
MF	15	Tith Dina		(substituted in) 67'
FW	9	Keo Sokpheng		(substituted in) 66'
FW	11	Chan Vathanaka		(substituted in) 85'
Manager:
(Argentina) Félix Dalmás

Man of the Match:
Nguyễn Quang Hải (Vietnam)

Assistant referees:
Rachen Srichai (Thailand)
Dinan Lazuardi (Indonesia)
Fourth official:
Oki Dwi Putra (Indonesia)

Overall
Statistics	Vietnam	Cambodia
Goals scored	3	0
Total shots	25	2
Shots on target	12	1
Ball possession	61%	39%
Corner kicks	3	1
Fouls committed	11	11
Offsides	1	0
Yellow cards	1	3
Red cards	0	0

=== Malaysia vs Myanmar ===
24 November 2018
20:30 UTC+8

Malaysia	3–0	Myanmar
Norshahrul 26'; Zaquan 45+3' (pen.), 88'	Report (AFFSZ); Report (AFF)

Bukit Jalil National Stadium, Kuala Lumpur
Attendance: 83,777
Referee: Alireza Faghani (Iran)

Malaysia	Myanmar

GK	1	Farizal Marlias
RB	4	Syahmi Safari
CB	7	Aidil Zafuan Radzak
CB	3	Shahrul Saad
LB	6	Syazwan Andik
RM	13	Mohamadou Sumareh		(substituted off) 79'
CM	14	Syamer Kutty Abba
CM	12	Akram Mahinan	(yellow card) 56'	(substituted off) 74'
LM	11	Safawi Rasid
CF	8	Zaquan Adha Radzak (c)
CF	9	Norshahrul Idlan Talaha		(substituted off) 62'
Substitutions:
FW	10	Shahrel Fikri		(substituted in) 62'
MF	15	Kenny Pallraj	(yellow card) 77'	(substituted in) 74'
MF	19	Akhyar Rashid		(substituted in) 79'
Manager:
Tan Cheng Hoe

GK	1	Kyaw Zin Htet (c)
RB	24	Win Moe Kyaw
CB	32	Zaw Min Tun
CB	15	Soe Moe Kyaw	(yellow card) 56'
LB	5	Nanda Kyaw
DM	6	Hlaing Bo Bo	(yellow card) 33'
RM	11	Maung Maung Lwin
CM	26	Lwin Moe Aung		(substituted off) 65'
CM	8	Maung Maung Soe	(yellow card) 28'	(substituted off) 34'
LM	16	Sithu Aung		(substituted off) 45'
CF	10	Aung Thu
Substitutions:
MF	19	Htet Phyoe Wai		(substituted in) 34'
FW	9	Zin Min Tun	(yellow card) 71'	(substituted in) 45'
MF	20	Than Htet Aung		(substituted in) 65'
Manager:
(Germany) Antoine Hey

Man of the Match:
Aidil Zafuan Radzak (Malaysia)

Assistant referees:
Reza Ebrahim Sokhandan (Iran)
Mohammad Reza Mansouri (Iran)
Fourth official:
Wiwat Jumpao-on (Thailand)

Overall
Statistics	Malaysia	Myanmar
Goals scored	3	0
Total shots	15	11
Shots on target	6	3
Ball possession	54%	46%
Corner kicks	6	6
Fouls committed	15	15
Offsides	1	5
Yellow cards	2	4
Red cards	0	0
