= 2018 AFF Championship squads =

Association football competition squads

Below are the squads for the 2018 AFF Championship, which took place from 8 November to 15 December 2018.

== Group A ==
=== Vietnam ===
Head coach: (South Korea) Park Hang-seo

The final squad was announced on 3 November 2018.

No.	Pos.	Player	Date of birth (age)	Club
1	GK	Bùi Tiến Dũng	28 February 1997 (aged 21)	(Vietnam Football Federation) FLC Thanh Hóa
3	DF	Quế Ngọc Hải (vice captain)	15 May 1993 (aged 25)	(Vietnam Football Federation) Sông Lam Nghệ An
4	DF	Bùi Tiến Dũng	2 October 1995 (aged 23)	(Vietnam Football Federation) Viettel
5	DF	Đoàn Văn Hậu	19 April 1999 (aged 19)	(Vietnam Football Federation) Hà Nội
6	MF	Lương Xuân Trường	28 April 1995 (aged 23)	(Vietnam Football Federation) Hoàng Anh Gia Lai
8	MF	Nguyễn Trọng Hoàng	14 April 1989 (aged 29)	(Vietnam Football Federation) FLC Thanh Hóa
9	FW	Nguyễn Văn Toàn	12 April 1996 (aged 22)	(Vietnam Football Federation) Hoàng Anh Gia Lai
10	FW	Nguyễn Văn Quyết (captain)	27 June 1991 (aged 27)	(Vietnam Football Federation) Hà Nội
11	FW	Nguyễn Anh Đức	24 October 1985 (aged 33)	(Vietnam Football Federation) Becamex Bình Dương
12	DF	Nguyễn Phong Hồng Duy	13 June 1996 (aged 22)	(Vietnam Football Federation) Hoàng Anh Gia Lai
13	FW	Hà Đức Chinh	22 September 1997 (aged 21)	(Vietnam Football Federation) SHB Đà Nẵng
14	FW	Nguyễn Công Phượng	21 January 1995 (aged 23)	(Vietnam Football Federation) Hoàng Anh Gia Lai
15	MF	Phạm Đức Huy	20 January 1995 (aged 23)	(Vietnam Football Federation) Hà Nội
16	MF	Đỗ Hùng Dũng	8 September 1993 (aged 25)	(Vietnam Football Federation) Hà Nội
17	DF	Lục Xuân Hưng	15 April 1995 (aged 23)	(Vietnam Football Federation) FLC Thanh Hóa
19	MF	Nguyễn Quang Hải	12 April 1997 (aged 21)	(Vietnam Football Federation) Hà Nội
20	FW	Phan Văn Đức	11 April 1996 (aged 22)	(Vietnam Football Federation) Sông Lam Nghệ An
21	DF	Trần Đình Trọng	25 April 1997 (aged 21)	(Vietnam Football Federation) Hà Nội
22	FW	Nguyễn Tiến Linh	20 October 1997 (aged 21)	(Vietnam Football Federation) Becamex Bình Dương
23	GK	Đặng Văn Lâm	13 August 1993 (aged 25)	(Vietnam Football Federation) Hải Phòng
26	GK	Nguyễn Tuấn Mạnh	31 July 1990 (aged 28)	(Vietnam Football Federation) Sanna Khánh Hòa BVN
28	DF	Đỗ Duy Mạnh	29 September 1996 (aged 22)	(Vietnam Football Federation) Hà Nội
29	MF	Nguyễn Huy Hùng	2 March 1992 (aged 26)	(Vietnam Football Federation) Quảng Nam

=== Malaysia ===
Head coach: Tan Cheng Hoe

The final squad was announced on 4 November 2018.

No.	Pos.	Player	Date of birth (age)	Club
1	GK	Farizal Marlias	29 June 1986 (aged 32)	(Football Association of Malaysia) Johor Darul Ta'zim
2	DF	Amirul Azhan	23 July 1993 (aged 25)	(Football Association of Malaysia) Perak
3	DF	Shahrul Saad	8 July 1993 (aged 25)	(Football Association of Malaysia) Perak
4	DF	Syahmi Safari	5 February 1998 (aged 20)	(Football Association of Malaysia) Selangor
5	DF	Adam Nor Azlin	5 January 1996 (aged 22)	(Football Association of Malaysia) Johor Darul Ta'zim
6	DF	Syazwan Andik	4 August 1996 (aged 22)	(Football Association of Malaysia) Kuala Lumpur
7	DF	Aidil Zafuan	3 August 1987 (aged 31)	(Football Association of Malaysia) Johor Darul Ta'zim
8	FW	Zaquan Adha (captain)	3 August 1987 (aged 31)	(Football Association of Malaysia) Kuala Lumpur
9	FW	Norshahrul Idlan	8 June 1986 (aged 32)	(Football Association of Malaysia) Pahang
10	FW	Shahrel Fikri	17 October 1994 (aged 24)	(Football Association of Thailand) Nakhon Ratchasima
11	MF	Safawi Rasid	5 March 1997 (aged 21)	(Football Association of Malaysia) Johor Darul Ta'zim
12	MF	Akram Mahinan	19 January 1993 (aged 25)	(Football Association of Malaysia) Kedah
13	MF	Mohamadou Sumareh	20 September 1994 (aged 24)	(Football Association of Malaysia) Pahang
14	MF	Syamer Kutty Abba	1 October 1997 (aged 21)	(Football Association of Malaysia) Johor Darul Ta'zim
15	MF	Kenny Pallraj	21 April 1993 (aged 25)	(Football Association of Malaysia) Perak
16	MF	Syazwan Zainon	13 November 1989 (aged 28)	(Football Association of Malaysia) Kedah
17	DF	Irfan Zakaria	4 June 1995 (aged 23)	(Football Association of Malaysia) Kuala Lumpur
18	FW	Syafiq Ahmad	28 June 1995 (aged 23)	(Football Association of Malaysia) Johor Darul Ta'zim
19	MF	Akhyar Rashid	1 May 1999 (aged 19)	(Football Association of Malaysia) Kedah
20	FW	Hazwan Bakri	19 June 1991 (aged 27)	(Football Association of Malaysia) Johor Darul Ta'zim
21	DF	Nazirul Naim	6 April 1993 (aged 25)	(Football Association of Malaysia) Perak
22	GK	Khairul Fahmi Che Mat	7 January 1989 (aged 29)	(Football Association of Malaysia) Melaka United
23	GK	Hafizul Hakim	30 March 1993 (aged 25)	(Football Association of Malaysia) Perak

=== Myanmar ===
Head coach: (Germany) Antoine Hey

The final squad was announced on 11 November 2018.

No.	Pos.	Player	Date of birth (age)	Club
1	GK	Kyaw Zin Htet	2 March 1990 (aged 28)	(Myanmar Football Federation) Yangon United
3	DF	Thein Than Win	25 November 1991 (aged 26)	(Myanmar Football Federation) Yadanarbon
4	DF	David Htan	13 May 1990 (aged 28)	(Myanmar Football Federation) Shan United
5	DF	Nanda Kyaw	3 September 1996 (aged 22)	(Myanmar Football Federation) Magwe
6	MF	Hlaing Bo Bo	8 July 1996 (aged 22)	(Myanmar Football Federation) Yadanarbon
7	MF	Ye Ko Oo	20 August 1991 (aged 27)	(Myanmar Football Federation) Yadanarbon
8	MF	Maung Maung Soe	6 August 1995 (aged 23)	(Myanmar Football Federation) Magwe
9	FW	Zin Min Tun	12 June 1993 (aged 25)	(Myanmar Football Federation) Shan United
10	FW	Aung Thu	22 May 1996 (aged 22)	(Football Association of Thailand) Police Tero
11	MF	Maung Maung Lwin	18 June 1995 (aged 23)	(Myanmar Football Federation) Yangon United
13	DF	Ye Yint Aung	26 February 1998 (aged 20)	(Myanmar Football Federation) Yadanarbon
14	MF	Yan Naing Oo	31 March 1996 (aged 22)	(Myanmar Football Federation) Shan United
15	DF	Soe Moe Kyaw	23 March 1999 (aged 19)	(Myanmar Football Federation) ISPE
16	MF	Sithu Aung	16 October 1996 (aged 22)	(Myanmar Football Federation) Yadanarbon
18	GK	Phone Thit Sar Min	6 November 1997 (aged 21)	(Myanmar Football Federation) Shan United
19	MF	Htet Phyoe Wai	15 December 1996 (aged 21)	(Myanmar Football Federation) Myawady
20	MF	Than Htet Aung	1 June 1992 (aged 26)	(Myanmar Football Federation) Zwekapin United
21	FW	Aee Soe	15 November 1996 (aged 21)	(Myanmar Football Federation) Yangon United
24	DF	Win Moe Kyaw	1 February 1997 (aged 21)	(Myanmar Football Federation) Magwe
25	GK	San Set Naing	4 November 1997 (aged 21)	(Myanmar Football Federation) Yangon United
26	MF	Lwin Moe Aung	10 December 1999 (aged 18)	(Myanmar Football Federation) ISPE
27	DF	Pyae Phyo Zaw	2 June 1994 (aged 24)	(Myanmar Football Federation) Yangon United
32	DF	Zaw Min Tun (captain)	20 May 1992 (aged 26)	(Myanmar Football Federation) Yangon United

=== Cambodia ===
Head coach: (Argentina) Félix Dalmás

The final squad was announced on 6 November 2018.

No.	Pos.	Player	Date of birth (age)	Club
1	GK	Chea Vansak	2 August 1999 (aged 19)	(Football Federation of Cambodia) Visakha
2	DF	Sath Rosib	7 July 1997 (aged 21)	(Football Federation of Cambodia) Boeung Ket
3	DF	Nen Sothearoth	24 December 1995 (aged 22)	(Football Federation of Cambodia) Preah Khan Reach Svay Rieng
4	DF	Sareth Krya	3 March 1996 (aged 22)	(Football Federation of Cambodia) Preah Khan Reach Svay Rieng
5	DF	Soeuy Visal	19 August 1995 (aged 23)	(Football Federation of Cambodia) Preah Khan Reach Svay Rieng
7	FW	Prak Mony Udom	24 August 1994 (aged 24)	(Football Federation of Cambodia) Preah Khan Reach Svay Rieng
8	MF	Orn Chanpolin	15 March 1998 (aged 20)	(Football Federation of Cambodia) Phnom Penh Crown
9	FW	Keo Sokpheng	3 March 1992 (aged 26)	(Football Federation of Cambodia) Visakha
10	MF	Kouch Sokumpheak (captain)	15 February 1987 (aged 31)	(Football Federation of Cambodia) Nagaworld
11	FW	Chan Vathanaka	23 January 1994 (aged 24)	(Football Federation of Cambodia) Boeung Ket
12	MF	Sos Suhana	4 April 1992 (aged 26)	(Football Federation of Cambodia) Nagaworld
14	FW	Reung Bunheing	25 September 1992 (aged 26)	(Football Federation of Cambodia) National Defense Ministry
15	MF	Tith Dina	5 June 1993 (aged 25)	(Football Federation of Cambodia) Visakha
16	FW	Sin Kakada	29 July 2000 (aged 18)	(Football Federation of Cambodia) Phnom Penh Crown
17	FW	Chhin Chhoeun	10 September 1992 (aged 26)	(Football Federation of Cambodia) National Defense Ministry
18	DF	Sor Piseth	8 August 1992 (aged 26)	(Football Federation of Cambodia) National Defense Ministry
19	DF	Cheng Meng	27 February 1998 (aged 20)	(Football Federation of Cambodia) Nagaworld
20	FW	Brak Thiva	5 December 1998 (aged 19)	(Football Federation of Cambodia) Phnom Penh Crown
21	GK	Keo Soksela	1 August 1997 (aged 21)	(Football Federation of Cambodia) Visakha
22	GK	Um Vichet	27 November 1993 (aged 24)	(Football Federation of Cambodia) National Defense Ministry
23	MF	Thierry Chantha Bin	1 June 1991 (aged 27)	(Football Association of Malaysia) Terengganu
24	MF	Kouch Dani	11 October 1990 (aged 28)	(Football Federation of Cambodia) Nagaworld
25	DF	Hong Pheng	1 November 1989 (aged 29)	(Football Federation of Cambodia) Boeung Ket

=== Laos ===
Head coach: (Singapore) V. Sundramoorthy

The final squad was announced on 8 November 2018.

No.	Pos.	Player	Date of birth (age)	Club
1	GK	Saymanolinh Paseuth	19 July 1999 (aged 19)	(Lao Football Federation) Young Elephants
2	DF	Vanna Bounlovongsa	21 November 1998 (aged 19)	(Lao Football Federation) Luang Prabang United
3	DF	Kaharn Phetsivilay	9 September 1999 (aged 19)	(Lao Football Federation) Young Elephants
4	MF	Lathasay Lounlasy	29 March 1998 (aged 20)	(Lao Football Federation) Young Elephants
5	DF	Thinnakone Vongsa	20 March 1992 (aged 26)	(Lao Football Federation) Lao Police
6	DF	Thothilath Sibounhuang (captain)	5 November 1990 (aged 28)	(Football Association of Thailand) Samut Prakan
7	MF	Soukaphone Vongchiengkham	9 March 1992 (aged 26)	(Football Association of Thailand) Sisaket
8	MF	Phathana Phommathep	27 February 1999 (aged 19)	(Football Association of Thailand) Chonburi Academy
9	FW	Soukchinda Natphasouk	30 October 1995 (aged 23)	(Lao Football Federation) Lao Police
10	MF	Chanthaphone Waenvongsoth	4 November 1994 (aged 24)	(Football Association of Thailand) Nan
11	FW	Chansamone Phommalivong	6 April 1998 (aged 20)	(Lao Football Federation) Young Elephant
12	GK	Outthilath Nammakhoth	13 September 1996 (aged 22)	(Lao Football Federation) Master 7
13	DF	Aphixay Thanakhanty	15 July 1998 (aged 20)	(Lao Football Federation) Young Elephants
14	DF	Mek Insoumang	12 April 1999 (aged 19)	(Lao Football Federation) Young Elephants
15	DF	Sonevilay Sihavong	18 August 1996 (aged 22)	(Lao Football Federation) Master 7
16	FW	Thatsaphone Saysouk	13 September 2000 (aged 18)	(Lao Football Federation) Young Elephants
17	MF	Bounphachan Bounkong	29 November 2000 (aged 17)	(Lao Football Federation) Young Elephants
18	GK	Keo-Oudone Souvannasangso	19 June 2000 (aged 18)	(Lao Football Federation) Lao Army
19	DF	Kittisak Phomvongsa	27 July 1999 (aged 19)	(Lao Football Federation) Young Elephants
20	FW	Somxay Keohanam	27 July 1998 (aged 20)	(Lao Football Federation) Young Elephants
21	MF	Tiny Bounmalay	6 June 1993 (aged 25)	(Lao Football Federation) Lao Police
22	MF	Phithack Kongmathilath	6 August 1996 (aged 22)	(Lao Football Federation) Lao Army
23	MF	Phouthone Innalay	11 February 1992 (aged 26)	(Lao Football Federation) Lao Army

== Group B ==
=== Thailand ===
Head coach: (Serbia) Milovan Rajevac

The final squad was announced on 5 November 2018.

No.	Pos.	Player	Date of birth (age)	Club
1	GK	Chatchai Budprom	4 February 1987 (aged 31)	(Football Association of Thailand) Bangkok Glass
2	FW	Chananan Pombuppha	17 March 1992 (aged 26)	(Football Association of Thailand) Suphanburi
4	DF	Chalermpong Kerdkaew (captain)	7 November 1986 (aged 32)	(Football Association of Thailand) Nakhon Ratchasima
5	DF	Mika Chunuonsee	26 March 1989 (aged 29)	(Football Association of Thailand) Bangkok United
6	DF	Pansa Hemviboon	8 July 1990 (aged 28)	(Football Association of Thailand) Buriram United
7	MF	Sumanya Purisai	5 December 1986 (aged 31)	(Football Association of Thailand) Bangkok United
8	MF	Thitipan Puangchan	1 September 1993 (aged 25)	(Football Association of Thailand) Bangkok Glass
9	FW	Adisak Kraisorn	1 February 1991 (aged 27)	(Football Association of Thailand) Muangthong United
11	FW	Mongkol Tossakrai	5 September 1987 (aged 31)	(Football Association of Thailand) Police Tero
13	DF	Philip Roller	10 June 1994 (aged 24)	(Football Association of Thailand) Ratchaburi Mitr Phol
14	FW	Nurul Sriyankem	8 February 1992 (aged 26)	(Football Association of Thailand) Port
15	DF	Suphan Thongsong	26 August 1994 (aged 24)	(Football Association of Thailand) Suphanburi
16	DF	Sasalak Haiprakhon	8 January 1996 (aged 22)	(Football Association of Thailand) Buriram United
17	DF	Tanaboon Kesarat	21 September 1993 (aged 25)	(Football Association of Thailand) Bangkok Glass
19	DF	Kevin Deeromram	11 September 1997 (aged 21)	(Football Association of Thailand) Port
20	DF	Manuel Bihr	17 September 1993 (aged 25)	(Football Association of Thailand) Bangkok United
21	MF	Pokklaw Anan	4 March 1991 (aged 27)	(Football Association of Thailand) Bangkok United
22	FW	Supachai Jaided	1 December 1998 (aged 19)	(Football Association of Thailand) Buriram United
23	GK	Siwarak Tedsungnoen	20 April 1984 (aged 34)	(Football Association of Thailand) Buriram United
24	DF	Korrakot Wiriyaudomsiri	19 January 1988 (aged 30)	(Football Association of Thailand) Buriram United
25	FW	Pakorn Prempak	2 February 1993 (aged 25)	(Football Association of Thailand) Port
29	MF	Sanrawat Dechmitr	3 August 1989 (aged 29)	(Football Association of Thailand) Bangkok United
31	GK	Saranon Anuin	24 March 1994 (aged 24)	(Football Association of Thailand) Chiangrai United

=== Indonesia ===
Head coach: Bima Sakti

The final squad was announced on 3 November 2018.

No.	Pos.	Player	Date of birth (age)	Club
1	GK	Muhammad Ridho	21 August 1991 (aged 27)	(Football Association of Indonesia) Borneo
2	DF	Putu Gede	7 June 1995 (aged 23)	(Football Association of Indonesia) Bhayangkara
3	DF	Alfath Fathier	28 May 1996 (aged 22)	(Football Association of Indonesia) Madura United
4	MF	Zulfiandi	17 July 1995 (aged 23)	(Football Association of Indonesia) Sriwijaya
5	DF	Bagas Adi	8 March 1997 (aged 21)	(Football Association of Indonesia) Arema
6	MF	Evan Dimas	13 March 1995 (aged 23)	(Football Association of Malaysia) Selangor
8	MF	Muhammad Hargianto	24 July 1996 (aged 22)	(Football Association of Indonesia) Bhayangkara
9	FW	Beto Gonçalves	31 December 1980 (aged 37)	(Football Association of Indonesia) Sriwijaya
10	FW	Stefano Lilipaly	20 January 1990 (aged 28)	(Football Association of Indonesia) Bali United
11	DF	Gavin Kwan Adsit	5 April 1996 (aged 22)	(Football Association of Indonesia) Barito Putera
12	GK	Awan Setho	20 March 1997 (aged 21)	(Football Association of Indonesia) Bhayangkara
13	FW	Febri Hariyadi	19 February 1996 (aged 22)	(Football Association of Indonesia) Persib Bandung
14	FW	Rizky Pora	22 November 1989 (aged 28)	(Football Association of Indonesia) Barito Putera
15	DF	Ricky Fajrin	6 September 1995 (aged 23)	(Football Association of Indonesia) Bali United
16	DF	Fachrudin Aryanto	19 February 1989 (aged 29)	(Football Association of Indonesia) Madura United
18	FW	Irfan Jaya	1 May 1996 (aged 22)	(Football Association of Indonesia) Persebaya
19	MF	Bayu Pradana	19 April 1991 (aged 27)	(Football Association of Indonesia) Mitra Kukar
21	FW	Andik Vermansyah	23 November 1991 (aged 26)	(Football Association of Malaysia) Kedah
23	DF	Hansamu Yama (captain)	16 January 1995 (aged 23)	(Football Association of Indonesia) Barito Putera
25	FW	Riko Simanjuntak	26 January 1992 (aged 26)	(Football Association of Indonesia) Persija Jakarta
26	GK	Andritany Ardhiyasa	26 December 1991 (aged 26)	(Football Association of Indonesia) Persija Jakarta
27	FW	Dedik Setiawan	27 June 1994 (aged 24)	(Football Association of Indonesia) Arema
29	FW	Septian David	1 September 1996 (aged 22)	(Football Association of Indonesia) Mitra Kukar

=== Philippines ===
Head coach: (Sweden) Sven-Göran Eriksson

The final squad was announced on 13 November 2018.

No.	Pos.	Player	Date of birth (age)	Club
1	GK	Neil Etheridge	7 February 1990 (aged 28)	(Football Association of Wales) Cardiff City
3	DF	Carli de Murga	30 November 1988 (aged 29)	(Philippine Football Federation) Ceres–Negros
5	FW	Mike Ott	2 March 1995 (aged 23)	(Philippine Football Federation) Ceres–Negros
6	DF	Luke Woodland	21 July 1995 (aged 23)	(Football Association of Thailand) Suphanburi
7	MF	Iain Ramsay	27 February 1988 (aged 30)	(Football Association of Malaysia) FELDA United
8	MF	Manuel Ott	6 May 1992 (aged 26)	(Philippine Football Federation) Ceres–Negros
10	FW	Phil Younghusband (captain)	4 August 1987 (aged 31)	(Philippine Football Federation) Davao Aguilas
11	DF	Daisuke Sato	20 September 1994 (aged 24)	(Romanian Football Federation) Sepsi Sfântu Gheorghe
12	DF	Amani Aguinaldo	24 April 1995 (aged 23)	(Philippine Football Federation) Ceres–Negros
14	MF	Kevin Ingreso	10 February 1993 (aged 25)	(Philippine Football Federation) Ceres–Negros
15	GK	Michael Falkesgaard	9 April 1991 (aged 27)	(Football Association of Thailand) Bangkok United
16	GK	Patrick Deyto	15 February 1990 (aged 28)	(Philippine Football Federation) Davao Aguilas
17	MF	Stephan Schröck	21 August 1986 (aged 32)	(Philippine Football Federation) Ceres–Negros
19	MF	Curt Dizon	4 February 1994 (aged 24)	(Philippine Football Federation) Ceres–Negros
21	MF	Martin Steuble	9 June 1988 (aged 30)	(Philippine Football Federation) Ceres–Negros
22	MF	Paul Mulders	16 January 1981 (aged 37)	(Philippine Football Federation) Ceres–Negros
23	MF	James Younghusband	4 September 1986 (aged 32)	(Philippine Football Federation) Davao Aguilas
25	DF	Stephan Palla	15 May 1989 (aged 29)	(Football Association of Thailand) Buriram United
26	FW	Jovin Bedic	8 June 1990 (aged 28)	(Philippine Football Federation) Kaya–Iloilo
29	FW	Patrick Reichelt	5 June 1988 (aged 30)	(Philippine Football Federation) Ceres–Negros
31	MF	Adam Reed	8 May 1991 (aged 27)	(Philippine Football Federation) Davao Aguilas
33	DF	Álvaro Silva	30 March 1984 (aged 34)	Unattached
36	DF	John-Patrick Strauß	28 January 1996 (aged 22)	(German Football Association) Erzgebirge Aue

=== Singapore ===
Head coach: Fandi Ahmad

The final squad was announced on 4 November 2018.

No.	Pos.	Player	Date of birth (age)	Club
1	GK	Izwan Mahbud	14 July 1990 (aged 28)	(Football Association of Thailand) Nongbua Pitchaya
2	DF	Shakir Hamzah	20 October 1992 (aged 26)	(Football Association of Singapore) Home United
4	DF	Nazrul Nazari	11 February 1991 (aged 27)	(Football Association of Singapore) Hougang United
5	DF	Baihakki Khaizan	31 January 1984 (aged 34)	(Football Association of Thailand) Udon Thani
7	DF	Zulqarnaen Suzliman	29 March 1998 (aged 20)	(Football Association of Singapore) Young Lions
8	DF	Jacob Mahler	20 April 2000 (aged 18)	(Football Association of Singapore) Young Lions
9	DF	Faritz Hameed	16 January 1990 (aged 28)	(Football Association of Singapore) Home United
10	FW	Faris Ramli	24 August 1992 (aged 26)	(Football Association of Malaysia) PKNS
11	MF	Yasir Hanapi	21 June 1989 (aged 29)	(Football Association of Singapore) Tampines Rovers
13	MF	Izzdin Shafiq	14 December 1990 (aged 27)	(Football Association of Singapore) Home United
14	MF	Hariss Harun (captain)	19 November 1990 (aged 27)	(Football Association of Malaysia) Johor Darul Ta'zim
15	FW	Iqbal Hussain	6 June 1993 (aged 25)	(Football Association of Singapore) Hougang United
16	DF	Irfan Fandi	13 August 1997 (aged 21)	(Football Association of Singapore) Young Lions
17	FW	Shahril Ishak	23 January 1984 (aged 34)	(Football Association of Singapore) Home United
18	GK	Hassan Sunny	2 April 1984 (aged 34)	(Football Association of Thailand) Army United
19	FW	Khairul Amri	14 March 1985 (aged 33)	(Football Association of Singapore) Tampines Rovers
20	FW	Ikhsan Fandi	9 April 1999 (aged 19)	(Football Association of Singapore) Young Lions
21	DF	Safuwan Baharudin	22 September 1991 (aged 27)	(Football Association of Malaysia) Pahang
22	FW	Gabriel Quak	22 December 1990 (aged 27)	(Football Association of Thailand) Navy
23	MF	Zulfahmi Arifin	5 October 1991 (aged 27)	(Football Association of Thailand) Chonburi
25	MF	Anumanthan Kumar	14 July 1994 (aged 24)	(Football Association of Singapore) Home United
27	MF	Adam Swandi	12 January 1996 (aged 22)	(Football Association of Singapore) Albirex Niigata (S)
30	GK	Zaiful Nizam	24 July 1987 (aged 31)	(Football Association of Singapore) Balestier Khalsa

=== Timor-Leste ===
Head coach: (Japan) Norio Tsukitate

The final squad was announced on 2 November 2018.

No.	Pos.	Player	Date of birth (age)	Club
1	GK	Aderito Fernandes	15 May 1997 (aged 21)	(East Timor Football Federation) Ponta Leste
2	DF	Yohanes Gusmão	1 October 2000 (aged 18)	(East Timor Football Federation) Benfica Laulara
3	DF	José Guterres	24 April 1998 (aged 20)	(East Timor Football Federation) Boavista
4	DF	Candido Oliveira	2 December 1997 (aged 20)	(East Timor Football Federation) Ponta Leste
5	DF	Jorge Victor (captain)	5 December 1997 (aged 20)	(East Timor Football Federation) Karketu Dili
6	MF	Nataniel Reis	25 March 1995 (aged 23)	(East Timor Football Federation) Boavista
7	FW	Rufino Gama	20 June 1998 (aged 20)	(East Timor Football Federation) Karketu Dili
8	FW	João Pedro	20 August 1998 (aged 20)	(East Timor Football Federation) Benfica Laulara
9	FW	Silveiro Garcia	2 April 1994 (aged 24)	(East Timor Football Federation) Ponta Leste
10	FW	Henrique Cruz	6 December 1997 (aged 20)	(East Timor Football Federation) Boavista
11	MF	Gelvanio da Costa	8 October 1998 (aged 20)	(East Timor Football Federation) Boavista
12	DF	Nidio Ricky	17 June 1994 (aged 24)	(East Timor Football Federation) Benfica Laulara
13	DF	Gumario Moreira	18 October 2001 (aged 17)	(East Timor Football Federation) Boavista
14	DF	Adelino Trindade	2 June 1995 (aged 23)	(East Timor Football Federation) Ponta Leste
15	MF	Armindo de Almeida	18 April 1998 (aged 20)	(East Timor Football Federation) Académica
16	DF	Domingos Freitas	13 July 1997 (aged 21)	(East Timor Football Federation) Karketu Dili
17	MF	José Almeida	12 July 1996 (aged 22)	(East Timor Football Federation) DIT
18	DF	Filomeno Junior	5 August 2000 (aged 18)	(East Timor Football Federation) Benfica Laulara
19	MF	Feliciano Pinheiro	11 February 1997 (aged 21)	(East Timor Football Federation) Ponta Leste
20	GK	Fagio Augusto	29 April 1997 (aged 21)	(East Timor Football Federation) Karketu Dili
21	FW	Edit Savio	28 August 1992 (aged 26)	(East Timor Football Federation) Boavista
22	DF	Nelson Viegas	24 December 1999 (aged 18)	(East Timor Football Federation) Boavista
23	MF	Osvaldo Belo	18 October 2000 (aged 18)	(East Timor Football Federation) Karketu Dili

== Statistics ==
=== Age ===
==== Outfield players ====
- Oldest: (Indonesia) Beto Gonçalves (37 years, 312 days)
- Youngest: (Timor-Leste) Gumario Moreira (17 years, 21 days)

==== Goalkeepers ====
- Oldest: (Singapore) Hassan Sunny (34 years, 220 days)
- Youngest: (Laos) Keo-Oudone Souvannasangso (18 years, 142 days)

==== Captains ====
- Oldest: (Thailand) Chalermpong Kerdkaew (32 years, 1 day)
- Youngest: (Timor-Leste) Jorge Victor (20 years, 338 days)

==== Coaches ====
- Oldest: (Sweden) Sven-Göran Eriksson (70 years, 276 days)
- Youngest: (Argentina) Félix Dalmás (30 years, 279 days)

=== Player representation by league system ===
Leagues	Players	Outside national squad
(Thailand) Thai League 1	33	10
Malaysia Super League	28	6
(Timor-Leste) LFA Primeira	23	0
(Vietnam) V.League 1	23	0
(Cambodia) Cambodian League	22	0
(Indonesia) Liga 1	21	0
Myanmar National League	22	0
(Laos) Lao Premier League	19	0
Philippines Football League	15	0
Singapore Premier League	14	0
(Thailand) Thai League 2	3	3
(Thailand) Thai League 4	2	2
(England) Premier League	1	1
(Germany) 2. Bundesliga	1	1
Malaysia Premier League	1	1
(Romania) Liga I	1	1

=== Player representation by club ===
Clubs with six or more players represented are listed.

Club	Players
(Laos) Young Elephants	10
(Philippines) Ceres-Negros	9
(Malaysia) Johor Darul Ta'zim	8
(Timor-Leste) Boavista	7
(Vietnam) Hà Nội	7
(Myanmar) Yangon United	6
(Thailand) Bangkok United	6
(Thailand) Buriram United	6

=== Player representation by club confederation ===
Confederation	Players
AFC	227
UEFA	3
CONCACAF	0
CONMEBOL	0
CAF	0
OFC	0

=== Coaches representation by country ===
Coaches in bold represented their own country.

Number	Country	Coaches
2	Singapore	**Fandi Ahmad**, V. Sundramoorthy (Laos)
1	Argentina	Félix Dalmás (Cambodia)
1	Germany	Antoine Hey (Myanmar)
1	Indonesia	**Bima Sakti**
1	Japan	Norio Tsukitate (Timor Leste)
1	Malaysia	**Tan Cheng Hoe**
1	Serbia	Milovan Rajevac (Thailand)
1	South Korea	Park Hang-seo (Vietnam)
1	Sweden	Sven-Göran Eriksson (Philippines)
