= Football at the 2017 SEA Games – Men's team squads =

Below are the squads for the Football at the 2017 SEA Games - men's tournament, hosted by Malaysia, which took place between 14 and 29 August 2017.

== Group A ==
=== Malaysia ===
Manager: Ong Kim Swee

No.	Pos.	Player	Date of birth (age)	Club
1	GK	Haziq Nadzli	6 January 1998 (aged 19)	(Football Association of Malaysia) Johor Darul Ta'zim
2	DF	Matthew Davies	7 February 1995 (aged 22)	(Football Association of Malaysia) Sri Pahang
3	DF	Syazwan Zaipol	24 February 1995 (aged 22)	(Football Association of Malaysia) PKNP
4	DF	Adib Zainudin (c)	15 February 1995 (aged 22)	(Football Association of Malaysia) Felcra
5	DF	Syahmi Safari	5 February 1998 (aged 19)	(Football Association of Malaysia) Selangor
6	MF	Safawi Rasid	5 March 1997 (aged 20)	(Football Association of Malaysia) Johor Darul Ta'zim
7	MF	Amirul Hisyam	5 May 1995 (aged 22)	(Football Association of Malaysia) Kedah Darul Aman
8	MF	Nor Azam Azih	3 January 1995 (aged 22)	(Football Association of Malaysia) Sri Pahang
9	DF	Adam Nor Azlin	5 January 1996 (aged 21)	(Football Association of Malaysia) Selangor
10	FW	Kumaahran Sathasivam	3 July 1996 (aged 21)	(Football Association of Malaysia) Penang
11	FW	Jafri Firdaus Chew	11 June 1997 (aged 20)	(Football Association of Malaysia) Penang
12	FW	Thanabalan Nadarajah	25 February 1995 (aged 22)	(Football Association of Malaysia) Felcra
13	DF	Ariff Farhan Isa	14 July 1996 (aged 21)	(Football Association of Malaysia) Kedah Darul Aman
14	MF	Syamer Kutty Abba	1 October 1997 (aged 19)	(Football Association of Malaysia) Penang
15	DF	Syazwan Andik	4 August 1996 (aged 21)	(Football Association of Malaysia) Johor Darul Ta'zim II
16	MF	Danial Amier	27 March 1997 (aged 20)	(Football Association of Malaysia) FELDA United
17	DF	Irfan Zakaria	4 June 1995 (aged 22)	(Football Association of Malaysia) Kuala Lumpur City
18	MF	Akhyar Rashid	1 May 1999 (aged 18)	(Football Association of Malaysia) Kedah Darul Aman
19	GK	Ifwat Akmal	10 August 1996 (aged 21)	(Football Association of Malaysia) Kedah Darul Aman
20	FW	Syafiq Ahmad	28 June 1995 (aged 22)	(Football Association of Malaysia) Penang

=== Myanmar ===
Manager: (Germany) Gerd Zeise

No.	Pos.	Player	Date of birth (age)	Club
1	GK	Sann Satt Naing	4 November 1997 (aged 19)	(Myanmar Football Federation) Yangon United
2	DF	Nan Wai Min	1 February 1996 (aged 21)	(Myanmar Football Federation) Yangon United
3	DF	Htike Htike Aung	1 February 1995 (aged 22)	(Myanmar Football Federation) Shan United
4	DF	Thiha Htet Aung	3 January 1996 (aged 21)	(Myanmar Football Federation) Chin United
5	DF	Nanda Kyaw	3 September 1996 (aged 20)	(Myanmar Football Federation) Magwe
6	MF	Ye Yint Tun	6 August 1995 (aged 22)	(Myanmar Football Federation) Yadanarbon
7	MF	Hlaing Bo Bo	8 July 1996 (aged 21)	(Myanmar Football Federation) Yadanarbon
8	MF	Maung Maung Soe	6 August 1995 (aged 22)	(Myanmar Football Federation) Magwe
9	FW	Aung Thu	22 May 1996 (aged 21)	(Myanmar Football Federation) Yadanarbon
10	MF	Sithu Aung (c)	16 October 1996 (aged 20)	(Myanmar Football Federation) Yadanarbon
11	FW	Maung Maung Lwin	18 June 1995 (aged 22)	(Myanmar Football Federation) Hanthawaddy United
12	DF	Naing Lin Tun	16 June 1995 (aged 22)	(Myanmar Football Federation) Magwe
13	DF	Tluanghup Thang	4 May 1995 (aged 22)	(Myanmar Football Federation) Chin United
14	MF	Yan Naing Oo	31 March 1996 (aged 21)	(Myanmar Football Federation) Shan United
15	FW	Than Paing	6 December 1996 (aged 20)	(Myanmar Football Federation) Chin United
16	FW	Shwe Ko	13 January 1998 (aged 19)	(Myanmar Football Federation) Shan United
17	DF	Hein Thiha Zaw	1 August 1995 (aged 22)	(Myanmar Football Federation) Shan United
18	GK	Phone Thit Sar Min	6 November 1997 (aged 19)	(Myanmar Football Federation) Shan United U-21
19	FW	Aung Kaung Mann	12 August 1998 (aged 19)	(Myanmar Football Federation) Ayeyawady United
20	FW	Shine Thura	10 March 1996 (aged 21)	(Myanmar Football Federation) Yadanarbon

=== Singapore ===
Manager: (France) Richard Tardy

No.	Pos.	Player	Date of birth (age)	Club
1	GK	Hairul Syirhan	21 August 1995 (aged 21)	(Football Association of Singapore) Young Lions
3	DF	Syahrul Sazali	3 June 1998 (aged 19)	(Football Association of Singapore) Young Lions
4	DF	Amirul Adli	13 January 1996 (aged 21)	(Football Association of Singapore) Young Lions
6	DF	Illyas Lee	1 December 1995 (aged 21)	(Football Association of Singapore) Young Lions
7	MF	Muhaimin Suhaimi	20 February 1995 (aged 22)	(Football Association of Singapore) Young Lions
8	MF	Joshua Pereira	10 October 1997 (aged 19)	(Football Association of Singapore) Young Lions
9	FW	Taufik Suparno	31 October 1995 (aged 21)	(Football Association of Singapore) Young Lions
10	MF	Adam Swandi	12 January 1996 (aged 21)	(Football Association of Singapore) Home United
11	FW	Ikhsan Fandi	9 April 1999 (aged 18)	(Football Association of Singapore) Young Lions
12	FW	Haiqal Pashia	29 November 1998 (aged 18)	(Football Association of Singapore) Young Lions
13	DF	Shahrin Saberin	14 February 1995 (aged 22)	(Football Association of Singapore) Young Lions
14	MF	Hami Syahin	16 December 1998 (aged 18)	(Football Association of Singapore) Young Lions
16	DF	Lionel Tan	5 June 1997 (aged 20)	(Football Association of Singapore) Hougang United
17	DF	Irfan Fandi (c)	13 August 1997 (aged 20)	(Football Association of Singapore) Home United
18	GK	Zharfan Rohaizad	21 February 1997 (aged 20)	(Football Association of Singapore) Young Lions
19	FW	Amiruldin Asraf	8 January 1997 (aged 20)	(Football Association of Singapore) Home United
20	FW	Hanafi Akbar	7 February 1995 (aged 22)	(Football Association of Singapore) Balestier Khalsa
21	MF	Ammirul Emmran	18 April 1995 (aged 22)	(Football Association of Singapore) Young Lions
25	DF	Rusyaidi Salime	25 April 1998 (aged 19)	(Football Association of Singapore) Young Lions
28	MF	Muhelmy Suhaimi	22 January 1996 (aged 21)	(Football Association of Singapore) Young Lions

=== Laos ===
Manager: (England) Dave Booth

No.	Pos.	Player	Date of birth (age)	Club
1	GK	Vilayphone Xayalath	26 November 1998 (aged 18)	(Lao Football Federation) NUoL
2	DF	Santi Somphoupheth	2 December 1997 (aged 19)	(Lao Football Federation) NUoL
3	DF	Vannaxay Sonesavanh	21 May 1998 (aged 19)	(Lao Football Federation) Lao Toyota
4	DF	Piyaphong Pathammavong	8 September 1998 (aged 18)	(Lao Football Federation) Lao Toyota
5	DF	Sinouane Xamounty	30 November 1997 (aged 19)	(Lao Football Federation) NUoL
6	FW	Khamphanh Sonthanalay	31 October 1997 (aged 19)	(Lao Football Federation) Lao Toyota
7	MF	Thanin Phanthavong	20 May 1998 (aged 19)	(Football Association of Thailand) Bangkok Glass
8	MF	Phathana Phommathep	27 February 1999 (aged 18)	(Lao Football Federation) Lanexang United
9	FW	Soukchinda Natphasouk	30 October 1995 (aged 21)	(Lao Football Federation) Lao Police
10	FW	Somchit Sibounheuang	14 August 1997 (aged 20)	(Lao Football Federation) Lanexang United
11	DF	Anouwath Phaphakdy	26 May 1997 (aged 20)	(Lao Football Federation) Lao Toyota
13	DF	Bounthavy Sipasong (c)	4 July 1996 (aged 21)	(Lao Football Federation) Lao Toyota
14	MF	Khampaseuth Syphovong	28 November 1996 (aged 20)	(Lao Football Federation) Electricite du Laos
15	MF	Khitsakhone Champathong	2 October 1995 (aged 21)	(Lao Football Federation) Lao Police
16	DF	Thinnakone Souliyamath	6 December 1995 (aged 21)	(Lao Football Federation) NUoL
18	GK	Saymanolinh Paseuth	19 July 1999 (aged 18)	(Lao Football Federation) Lao Toyota
19	MF	Armisay Kettavong	16 October 1996 (aged 20)	(Lao Football Federation) Lao Toyota
20	MF	Lathasay Lounlasy	29 March 1998 (aged 19)	(Lao Football Federation) NUoL
22	MF	Phithack Kongmathilath	6 August 1996 (aged 21)	(Lao Football Federation) Lao Toyota
23	MF	Phoutthasay Khochalern	29 December 1995 (aged 21)	(Lao Football Federation) Lanexang United

=== Brunei ===
Manager: (South Korea) Kwon Oh-son

No.	Pos.	Player	Date of birth (age)	Club
1	GK	Ishyra Asmin Jabidi	9 July 1998 (aged 19)	(Football Association of Brunei Darussalam) Kasuka
2	DF	Faezuddin Haris Nasution	7 March 1997 (aged 20)	(Football Association of Brunei Darussalam) Jerudong
3	DF	Suhaimi Anak Sulau	3 March 1996 (aged 21)	(Football Association of Brunei Darussalam) Panchor Murai
4	DF	Khalid Mahmud	21 September 1995 (aged 21)	(Football Association of Brunei Darussalam) Menglait
5	DF	Akif Roslan	17 September 1997 (aged 19)	(Football Association of Brunei Darussalam) Lun Bawang
6	DF	Syakir Basri	2 October 1997 (aged 19)	(Football Association of Brunei Darussalam) Wijaya
7	MF	Asnawi Syazni Abdul Aziz	16 June 1996 (aged 21)	(Football Association of Brunei Darussalam) Jerudong
8	MF	Nazirrudin Ismail	27 December 1998 (aged 18)	(Football Association of Brunei Darussalam) Indera
9	FW	Faiq Bolkiah (c)	9 May 1998 (aged 19)	(The Football Association) Leicester City
10	MF	Azim Izamuddin Suhaimi	20 March 1997 (aged 20)	(Football Association of Brunei Darussalam) DPMM
12	MF	Aman Abdul Rahim	23 June 1996 (aged 21)	(Football Association of Brunei Darussalam) Kasuka
13	MF	Nadzri Erwan	16 June 1995 (aged 22)	(Football Association of Brunei Darussalam) MS ABDB
14	DF	Martin Haddy Khallidden	21 April 1998 (aged 19)	(Football Association of Brunei Darussalam) Najip I-Team
15	DF	Alimuddin Jamaludin	9 August 1997 (aged 20)	(Football Association of Brunei Darussalam) Jerudong
16	FW	Zulkhairy Razali	16 May 1996 (aged 21)	(Football Association of Brunei Darussalam) Indera
17	MF	Shafie Effendy	4 August 1995 (aged 22)	(Football Association of Brunei Darussalam) Indera
19	GK	Haimie Anak Nyaring	31 May 1998 (aged 19)	(Football Association of Brunei Darussalam) Panchor Murai
20	FW	Azreen Eskander Sa'oda	3 May 1997 (aged 20)	(Football Association of Brunei Darussalam) Lun Bawang
23	MF	Yura Indera Putera Yunos	25 May 1996 (aged 21)	(Football Association of Brunei Darussalam) DPMM
24	FW	Haziq Kasyful Azim Hasimulabdillah	24 December 1998 (aged 18)	(Football Association of Brunei Darussalam) Menglait

== Group B ==
=== Thailand ===
Manager: Worrawoot Srimaka

No.	Pos.	Player	Date of birth (age)	Club
1	GK	Anusith Termmee	19 January 1995 (aged 22)	(Football Association of Thailand) Bangkok United
2	MF	Sasalak Haiprakhon	8 January 1996 (aged 21)	(Football Association of Thailand) Buriram United
3	DF	Suriya Singmui	7 April 1995 (aged 22)	(Football Association of Thailand) Chiangrai United
4	DF	Worawut Namvech	4 July 1995 (aged 22)	(Football Association of Thailand) Sisaket
5	DF	Shinnaphat Leeaoh	2 February 1997 (aged 20)	(Football Association of Thailand) Chiangrai United
6	MF	Chaowat Veerachat	23 June 1996 (aged 21)	(Football Association of Thailand) Bangkok Glass
7	MF	Nattawut Sombatyotha	1 May 1996 (aged 21)	(Football Association of Thailand) Ratchaburi Mitr Phol
8	MF	Nopphon Ponkam	19 July 1996 (aged 21)	(Football Association of Thailand) Air Force Central
9	FW	Chenrop Samphaodi (c)	2 June 1995 (aged 22)	(Football Association of Thailand) BEC Tero Sasana
10	MF	Chaiyawat Buran	26 October 1995 (aged 21)	(Football Association of Thailand) Chiangrai United
11	DF	Kevin Deeromram	11 September 1997 (aged 19)	(Football Association of Thailand) Ratchaburi Mitr Phol
12	DF	Peerawat Akkatam	3 December 1998 (aged 18)	(Football Association of Thailand) Buriram United
13	MF	Picha Autra	7 January 1996 (aged 21)	(Football Association of Thailand) Pattaya United
14	MF	Montree Promsawat	27 August 1995 (aged 21)	(Football Association of Thailand) Ratchaburi Mitr Phol
15	DF	Saringkan Promsupa	29 March 1997 (aged 20)	(Football Association of Thailand) Rayong
16	MF	Phitiwat Sukjitthammakul	1 February 1995 (aged 22)	(Football Association of Thailand) Chiangrai United
17	DF	Ratthanakorn Maikami	7 January 1998 (aged 19)	(Football Association of Thailand) Buriram United
18	MF	Worachit Kanitsribampen	24 August 1997 (aged 19)	(Football Association of Thailand) Chonburi
19	FW	Sittichok Kannoo	9 August 1996 (aged 21)	(Football Association of Thailand) Thai Honda Ladkrabang
20	GK	Nont Muangngam	20 April 1997 (aged 20)	(Football Association of Thailand) Chiangrai United

=== Vietnam ===
Manager: Nguyễn Hữu Thắng

No.	Pos.	Player	Date of birth (age)	Club
1	GK	Bùi Tiến Dũng	28 February 1997 (aged 20)	(Vietnam Football Federation) FLC Thanh Hóa
2	DF	Trần Văn Kiên	13 May 1996 (aged 21)	(Vietnam Football Federation) Hà Nội
3	DF	Hoàng Văn Khánh	5 April 1995 (aged 22)	(Vietnam Football Federation) Sông Lam Nghệ An
4	DF	Bùi Tiến Dũng (c)	2 October 1995 (aged 21)	(Vietnam Football Federation) Viettel
6	MF	Lương Xuân Trường	28 April 1995 (aged 22)	(Korea Football Association) Gangwon
7	DF	Trần Đình Trọng	25 April 1997 (aged 20)	(Vietnam Football Federation) Sài Gòn
8	MF	Nguyễn Tuấn Anh	16 May 1995 (aged 22)	(Vietnam Football Federation) Hoàng Anh Gia Lai
9	MF	Nguyễn Văn Toàn	12 April 1996 (aged 21)	(Vietnam Football Federation) Hoàng Anh Gia Lai
10	FW	Nguyễn Công Phượng	21 January 1995 (aged 22)	(Vietnam Football Federation) Hoàng Anh Gia Lai
11	MF	Đỗ Duy Mạnh	29 September 1996 (aged 20)	(Vietnam Football Federation) Hà Nội
12	MF	Nguyễn Phong Hồng Duy	13 June 1996 (aged 21)	(Vietnam Football Federation) Hoàng Anh Gia Lai
13	MF	Lâm Ti Phông	1 February 1996 (aged 21)	(Vietnam Football Federation) Sanna Khánh Hòa
14	FW	Lê Thanh Bình	8 August 1995 (aged 22)	(Vietnam Football Federation) FLC Thanh Hóa
16	MF	Trần Hữu Đông Triều	20 August 1995 (aged 21)	(Vietnam Football Federation) Hoàng Anh Gia Lai
17	DF	Vũ Văn Thanh	14 April 1996 (aged 21)	(Vietnam Football Federation) Hoàng Anh Gia Lai
19	MF	Nguyễn Quang Hải	12 April 1997 (aged 20)	(Vietnam Football Federation) Hà Nội
20	DF	Đoàn Văn Hậu	19 April 1999 (aged 18)	(Vietnam Football Federation) Hà Nội
22	GK	Phí Minh Long	11 February 1995 (aged 22)	(Vietnam Football Federation) Hà Nội
26	FW	Hà Đức Chinh	22 September 1997 (aged 19)	(Vietnam Football Federation) Đà Nẵng
27	FW	Hồ Tuấn Tài	16 March 1995 (aged 22)	(Vietnam Football Federation) Sông Lam Nghệ An

=== Indonesia ===
Manager: (Spain) Luis Milla

No.	Pos.	Player	Date of birth (age)	Club
1	GK	Satria Tama	23 January 1997 (aged 20)	(Football Association of Indonesia) Persegres Gresik
2	DF	Putu Gede	7 June 1995 (aged 22)	(Football Association of Indonesia) Bhayangkara
3	DF	Andy Setyo	16 September 1997 (aged 19)	(Football Association of Indonesia) PS TNI
4	DF	Ryuji Utomo	1 July 1995 (aged 22)	(Football Association of Indonesia) Persija Jakarta
6	MF	Evan Dimas	13 March 1995 (aged 22)	(Football Association of Indonesia) Bhayangkara
8	MF	Muhammad Hargianto	24 July 1996 (aged 21)	(Football Association of Indonesia) Persija Jakarta
10	FW	Ezra Walian	22 October 1997 (aged 19)	(Royal Dutch Football Association) Almere City
11	DF	Gavin Kwan Adsit	5 April 1996 (aged 21)	(Football Association of Indonesia) PS Barito Putera
13	FW	Febri Haryadi	19 February 1996 (aged 21)	(Football Association of Indonesia) Persib Bandung
14	DF	Asnawi Mangkualam	4 October 1999 (aged 17)	(Football Association of Indonesia) PSM Makassar
15	DF	Ricky Fajrin	6 September 1995 (aged 21)	(Football Association of Indonesia) Bali United
17	FW	Saddil Ramdani	2 January 1999 (aged 18)	(Football Association of Indonesia) Persela Lamongan
20	GK	Kurniawan Ajie	20 June 1996 (aged 21)	(Football Association of Indonesia) Persiba Balikpapan
21	MF	Hanif Sjahbandi	7 April 1997 (aged 20)	(Football Association of Indonesia) Arema
22	FW	Yabes Roni	6 February 1995 (aged 22)	(Football Association of Indonesia) Bali United
23	DF	Hansamu Yama (c)	16 January 1995 (aged 22)	(Football Association of Indonesia) PS Barito Putera
24	FW	Marinus Wanewar	24 February 1997 (aged 20)	(Football Association of Indonesia) Persipura Jayapura
25	FW	Osvaldo Haay	1 May 1997 (aged 20)	(Football Association of Indonesia) Persipura Jayapura
28	DF	Rezaldi Hehanusa	7 November 1995 (aged 21)	(Football Association of Indonesia) Persija Jakarta
29	FW	Septian David	2 September 1996 (aged 20)	(Football Association of Indonesia) Mitra Kukar

=== Cambodia ===
Manager: (Brazil) Leonardo Vitorino

No.	Pos.	Player	Date of birth (age)	Club
1	GK	Keo Soksela	1 August 1997 (aged 20)	(Football Federation of Cambodia) Phnom Penh Crown
2	DF	Seut Baraing	29 September 1999 (aged 17)	(Football Federation of Cambodia) Phnom Penh Crown
3	DF	Nen Sothearoth	24 December 1995 (aged 21)	(Football Federation of Cambodia) Preah Khan Reach Svay Rieng
4	FW	Noun Borey	5 August 1996 (aged 21)	(Football Federation of Cambodia) National Police Commissary
5	DF	Soeuy Visal (c)	19 August 1995 (aged 21)	(Football Federation of Cambodia) Preah Khan Reach Svay Rieng
6	DF	Chhom Pisa	3 March 1995 (aged 22)	(Football Federation of Cambodia) Phnom Penh Crown
7	MF	Brak Thiva	5 December 1998 (aged 18)	(Football Federation of Cambodia) Phnom Penh Crown
8	MF	Hoy Phallin	30 March 1996 (aged 21)	(Football Federation of Cambodia) Preah Khan Reach Svay Rieng
9	FW	Sok Samnang	18 January 1995 (aged 22)	(Football Federation of Cambodia) Preah Khan Reach Svay Rieng
10	MF	In Sodavid	2 July 1998 (aged 19)	(Football Federation of Cambodia) Phnom Penh Crown
11	DF	Cheng Meng	27 February 1998 (aged 19)	(Football Federation of Cambodia) Nagaworld
12	MF	Choun Chanchav	5 May 1999 (aged 18)	(Football Federation of Cambodia) Phnom Penh Crown
13	DF	Nub Tola	1 October 1996 (aged 20)	(Football Federation of Cambodia) Preah Khan Reach Svay Rieng
14	MF	Pov Ponvuthy	22 January 1998 (aged 19)	(Football Federation of Cambodia) Phnom Penh Crown
15	MF	Kunthea Ravan	2 September 1999 (aged 17)	(Football Federation of Cambodia) Preah Khan Reach Svay Rieng
16	MF	Chrerng Polroth	7 April 1997 (aged 20)	(Football Federation of Cambodia) National Defense Ministry
17	DF	Samoeun Pidor	20 May 1996 (aged 21)	(Football Federation of Cambodia) Preah Khan Reach Svay Rieng
18	GK	Um Sereyroth	25 September 1995 (aged 21)	(Football Federation of Cambodia) National Defense Ministry
19	MF	Sun Vandeth	22 August 1997 (aged 19)	(Football Federation of Cambodia) National Police Commissary
20	MF	Sin Kakada	29 July 2000 (aged 17)	(Football Federation of Cambodia) Phnom Penh Crown

=== Philippines ===
Manager: Marlon Maro

No.	Pos.	Player	Date of birth (age)	Club
1	GK	Ray Joseph Joyel	4 September 1996 (aged 20)	(Philippine Football Federation) Kaya FC–Makati-B
2	MF	Jordan Jarvis	17 April 1998 (aged 19)	(Philippine Football Federation) Davao Aguilas
3	MF	Daniel Gadia	3 July 1995 (aged 22)	(Philippine Football Federation) Meralco Manila
5		Jeremiah Rocha	9 December 1996 (aged 20)	(Philippine Football Federation) Kaya FC–Makati-B
6	MF	Yoshiharu Koizumi	19 January 1995 (aged 22)	(Philippine Football Federation) Forza FC
7	DF	Junell Bautista	10 June 1996 (aged 21)	(Philippine Football Federation) Davao Aguilas
9		Troy Limbo	17 November 1997 (aged 19)	(Philippine Football Federation) Kaya FC–Makati-B
10	MF	Dylan De Bruycker	5 December 1997 (aged 19)	(Philippine Football Federation) Davao Aguilas
11	DF	Julian Clariño (c)	15 August 1995 (aged 21)	(Philippine Football Federation) Meralco Manila
12		Nimrod Balabat	14 March 1995 (aged 22)	(Philippine Football Federation) San Beda College
13	DF	Joshua Grommen		(Philippine Football Federation) Ceres–Negros
14	DF	Kouichi Belgira	28 December 1996 (aged 20)	(Philippine Football Federation) JPV Marikina
15		Richard Talaroc	23 April 1995 (aged 22)	(Philippine Football Federation) Davao Aguilas
16		Christian Lapas	10 November 1998 (aged 18)	(Philippine Football Federation) Kaya FC–Makati-B
18		Roberto Corsame Jr.	14 December 1996 (aged 20)	(Philippine Football Federation) Arellano University
19	GK	Nathanael Villanueva	25 October 1995 (aged 21)	(Philippine Football Federation) Meralco Manila
20		Reymart Cubon	16 April 1995 (aged 22)	(Philippine Football Federation) Davao Aguilas
21		Jeremiah Borlongan	28 August 1995 (aged 21)	(Philippine Football Federation) Kaya FC–Makati-B
23	FW	Jarvey Gayoso	11 February 1997 (aged 20)	(Philippine Football Federation) Ateneo de Manila University

=== Timor-Leste ===
Manager: (South Korea) Kim Shin-hwan

No.	Pos.	Player	Date of birth (age)	Club
1	GK	Celestino Xavier Dias da Costa	20 September 1996 (aged 20)	(East Timor Football Federation) Carsae
2	DF	Juliao Dos Reis Mendonca	3 July 1995 (aged 22)	(East Timor Football Federation) DIT
3	DF	Adelino Trindade	2 June 1995 (aged 22)	(East Timor Football Federation) Ponta Leste
4	DF	Filipe Oliveira	14 May 1995 (aged 22)	(East Timor Football Federation) SLB Laulara
5	DF	Jorge Sabas Victor (c)	5 December 1997 (aged 19)	(East Timor Football Federation) Carsae
7	FW	Rufino Gama	20 June 1998 (aged 19)	(East Timor Football Federation) Académica
8	FW	Filomeno Junior da Costa	11 February 1997 (aged 20)	(East Timor Football Federation) SLB Laulara
9	MF	Kornelis Nahak Portela	3 October 2001 (aged 15)	(Royal Spanish Football Federation) Málaga
10	FW	Henrique Cruz	6 December 1997 (aged 19)	(East Timor Football Federation) Carsae
11	MF	Nataniel de Jesus Reis	25 March 1995 (aged 22)	(East Timor Football Federation) Carsae
13	FW	Danilson Conceicao Araujo	11 February 2001 (aged 16)	(East Timor Football Federation) DIT
14	MF	Jose Dos Santos Almeida	12 July 1996 (aged 21)	(East Timor Football Federation) DIT
15	MF	Armindo Correia de Almeida	18 April 1998 (aged 19)	(East Timor Football Federation) Académica
16	MF	Jorge Manuel Alves	5 December 1997 (aged 19)	(East Timor Football Federation) Ponta Leste
17	FW	Gaudencio Armindo Monteiro	2 July 1998 (aged 19)	(East Timor Football Federation) SLB Laulara
19	MF	Feliciano Pinheiro Goncalves	11 February 1997 (aged 20)	(East Timor Football Federation) DIT
20	GK	Fagio Augusto	29 April 1997 (aged 20)	(East Timor Football Federation) Porto Taibesse
21	MF	Frangcyatma Alves Ima Kefi	27 January 1997 (aged 20)	(East Timor Football Federation) DIT
22	DF	Nelson Sarmento Viegas	24 December 1999 (aged 17)	(East Timor Football Federation) Carsae
23	DF	Gumario Augusto Fernandez da Silva Moreira	14 December 2001 (aged 15)	(East Timor Football Federation) DIT
