= Hoang Anh Attapeu F.C. =

Hoang Anh Attapeu
- Full name: Hoàng Anh Attapeu Football Club
- Founded: 2013
- Ground: Attapeu Stadium; Attapeu, Laos
- Owner: Hoang Anh Gia Lai Group
- Chairman: Đoàn Nguyên Đức.
- Head coach: Vacant
- League: Lao League 1
- 2026-2027: Lao League 1,

Hoàng Anh Attapeu Football Club or HAA was a football club based in Attapeu, Laos. The club played its home games at Attapeu Stadium.

                                                                                                                          It was owned by Vietnamese  Hoàng Anh Gia Lai Group, who also owns V-League side Hoàng Anh Gia Lai.[2]

== Honours ==
=== Domestic competitions ===
- Lao League 1
  - Winners (1): 2014

=== International competitions ===
- Mekong Club Championship
  - Fourth place: 2014

== players ==
Note: Flags indicate national team as defined under FIFA eligibility rules; some limited exceptions apply. Players may hold more than one non-FIFA nationality.

No.	Pos.	Nation	Player
1	GK	LAO	Outthilath Nammakhoth
2	DF	LAO	Souksakhone Vongsa
3	DF	LAO	Sonevilay Sihavong
5	DF	LAO	Chuefong Xiong
6	DF	LAO	Thothilath Sibounhuang
7	MF	LAO	Khonesavanh Sihavong
9	MF	LAO	Chanthaphone Waenvongsoth
10	MF	LAO	Phoutthasay Khochalern
11	FW	LAO	Lembo Saysana

No.	Pos.	Nation	Player
13	DF	LAO	Bounthavy Sipasong
14	MF	LAO	Sisawad Dalavong
17	MF	LAO	Phonepaseuth Sysoutham
18	MF	LAO	Vilayuth Sayyabounsou
19	DF	LAO	Sengdao Inthilath
20	FW	LAO	Sopha Saysana
21	MF	LAO	Phoutdavy Phommasane
23	MF	LAO	Armixay Kettavong
24	GK	LAO	Soukthavy Soundala

== Continental record ==
Season	Competition	Round	Club	Home	Away	Aggregate
2014	Mekong Club Championship	Semi Final	(Myanmar) Ayeyawady United	1–1 (5–4 (p))		
2014	Mekong Club Championship	3rd Place Playoff	(Cambodia) Phnom Penh Crown	0–2		

== Affiliated clubs ==
- (Vietnam) Hoàng Anh Gia Lai
