= Koen Bosma =

Dutch footballer (born 1990)

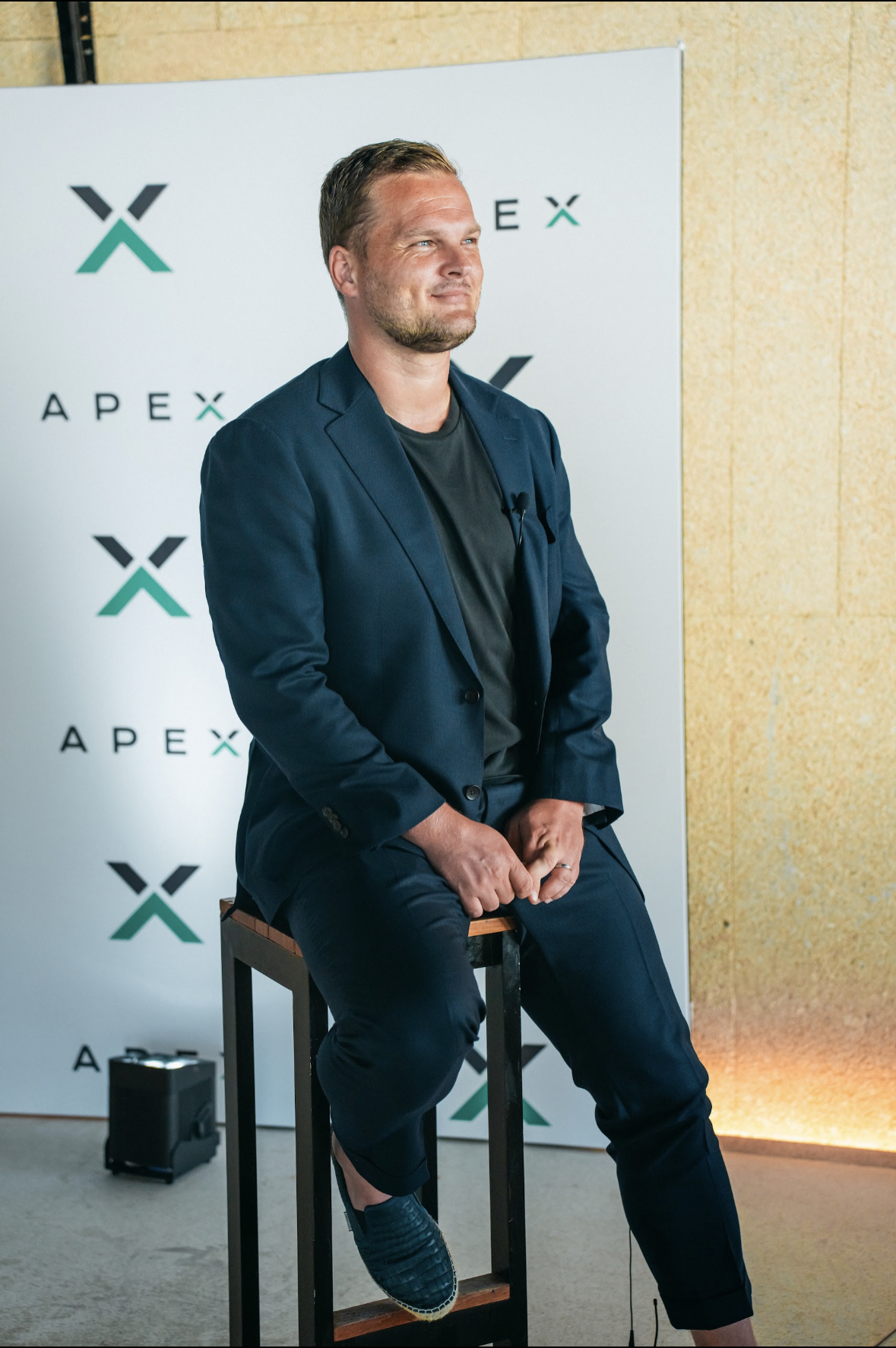
- Bosma in 2024

Personal information
- Date of birth: 11 September 1990 (age 36)
- Place of birth: Amstelveen, Netherlands
- Height: 1.83 m (6 ft 0 in)
- Position: Forward

Senior career*
| Years | Team | Apps | (Gls) |
| 2008–2009 | Haarlem | 2 | (0) |
| 2010–2014 | VVSB | 103 | (29) |
| 2014 | Phnom Penh Crown | 0 | (0) |
| 2014–2015 | Sông Lam Nghệ An | 3 | (0) |
| 2015 | Sydney United 58 | | |
| 2015–2019 | AFC | 49 | (11) |
- * Club domestic league appearances and goals

Koen Bosma (born 11 September 1990 in Amstelveen, Netherlands) is a Dutch footballer who presently plays for Amsterdamsche FC of the Dutch Tweede Divisie as of 2015. Besides the Netherlands, he has played in Cambodia, Vietnam, and Australia.

== Career ==
=== Cambodia ===
Impressing during a trial with 2011 Cambodian League winners Phnom Penh Crown and netting three goals in a friendly versus TriAsia, Bosma officially completed his transfer to the club in August 2014, signing for one season only and intermingling with five foreigners as well as eight Cambodia national team players. Next, he participated in the pre-season 2014 Mekong Club Championship with the club, scoring a goal in their first game, a 5–2 defeat to Becamex Binh Duong in the semi-finals.

Comparing footballers in Cambodia to their Dutch counterparts, Bosma has stated that they are better at attacking play but are behind in terms of tactics and defense.

=== Vietnam ===
Cancelling his contract with the acquiescence of the Phnom Penh Crown board shortly after the Mekong Club Championship, the Dutchman signed for Song Lam Nghe An of the Vietnamese V.League 1 in December 2014, changing to a midfield position in the process. Despite beginning the 2015 season well with two starts and two assists in his first two games, Bosma was substituted in the third round, which would prove to be his last official game in Vietnam. After only being used for practice matches, Bosma arranged a meeting with the Song Lam Nghe An president and left by April 2015.

Throughout his stay in Vietnam, the forward was seen as more of a playmaker and was praised by the club president as a smart footballer.

=== Australia ===
Joining Sydney United 58 of the Australian NPL NSW until the end of the 2015 season following his spell in Vietnam, Bosma almost sealed a move to a Malaysian third division team but the deal never happened. While plying his trade with Sydney United, the Amstelveen native helped them clinch the 2015 Waratah Cup, making two assists in the semi-final.
