= 2014 Mekong Club Championship =

Tournament details
- Host country: Vietnam
- Dates: 31 October – 2 November
- Teams: 4 (from 4 associations)
- Venue: 1 (in 1 host city)

Final positions
- Champions: (Vietnam) Becamex Binh Duong (1st title)
- Runners-up: (Myanmar) Ayeyawady United

Tournament statistics
- Matches played: 4
- Goals scored: 16 (4 per match)
- Top scorer: (Nigeria) George Bisan (3 goals)
- Best player: (Vietnam) Nguyễn Anh Đức

The 2014 Mekong Club Championship was the inaugural season of the Mekong Club Championship. Four teams from the respective domestic league winners from Cambodia, Laos, Myanmar and Vietnam competed. The inaugural championship was in Vietnam from 31 October 2014 and 2 November and played on a knockout basis starting from the semi-finals stage. The championship is sponsored by Toyota.

== Qualified teams ==
Team	Federation	Qualification
(Vietnam) Becamex Bình Dương	Vietnam	Winners of the 2014 V.League 1
(Cambodia) Phnom Penh Crown	Cambodia	Winners of the 2014 Cambodian League
(Laos) Hoang Anh Attapeu	Laos	Winners of the 2014 Lao League
(Myanmar) Ayeyawady United	Myanmar	Winners of the 2014 Myanmar National League

== Venues ==
(Vietnam) Thủ Dầu Một
Gò Đậu Stadium
Capacity: 18,250
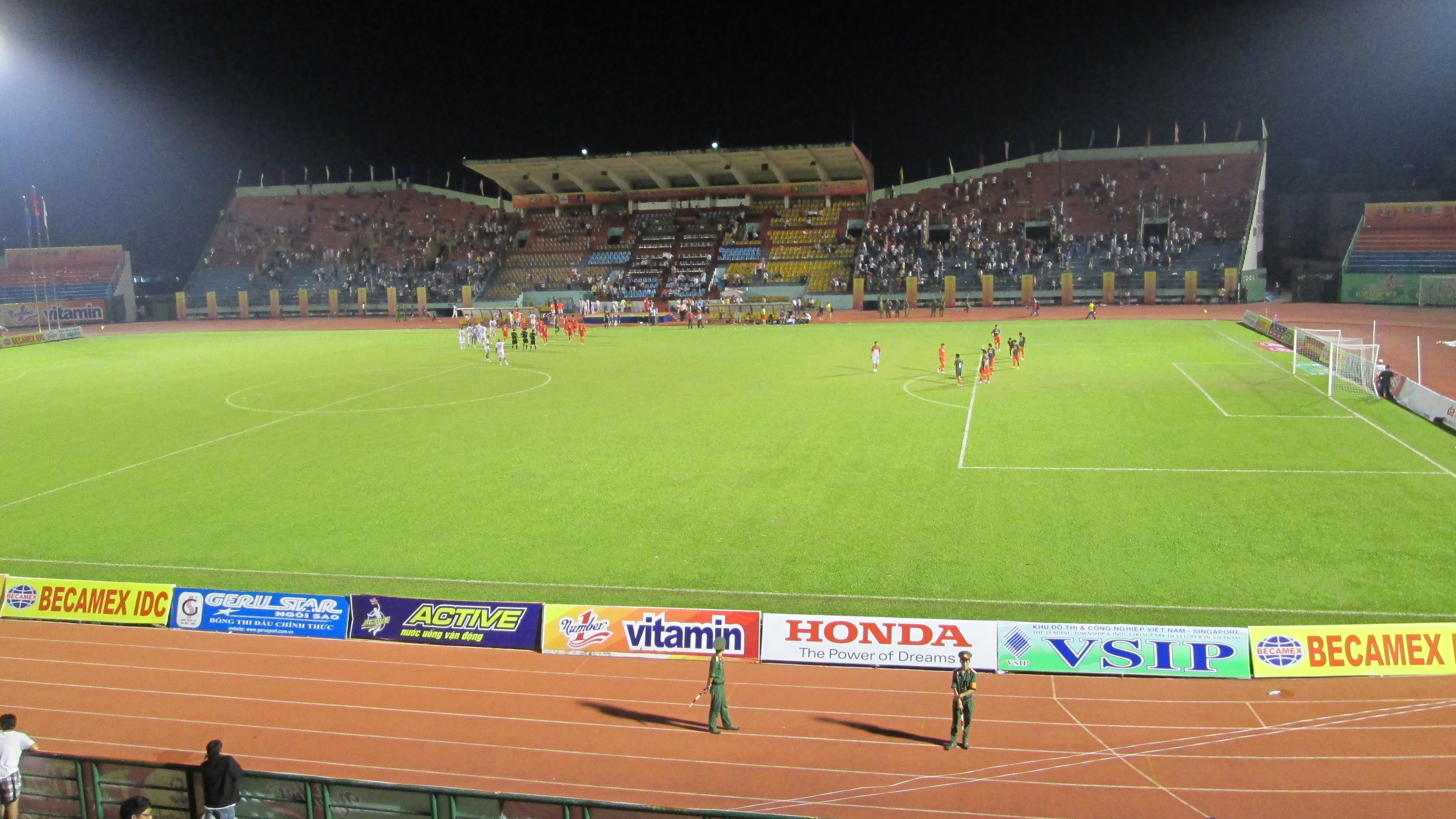

== Knockout stage ==
=== Bracket ===
Semi-finals
31 October – Thủ Dầu Một
(Myanmar) Ayeyawady United (pen.)	1 (5)
(Laos) Hoang Anh Attapeu	1 (4)
31 October – Thủ Dầu Một
(Vietnam) Becamex Binh Duong	5
(Cambodia) Phnom Penh Crown	2

Final
2 November – Thủ Dầu Một
(Vietnam) Becamex Binh Duong	4
(Myanmar) Ayeyawady United	1
Third place
2 November – Thủ Dầu Một
(Laos) Hoang Anh Attapeu	0
(Cambodia) Phnom Penh Crown	2

=== Semi-finals ===
31 October 2014
17:00 UTC+7

Ayeyawady United (Myanmar)	1–1	(Laos) Hoang Anh Attapeu
Sim Woon-sub 66'	Report	Sysoutham 72'
Penalties
Lin Oo (penalty scored); Sim Woon-sub (penalty scored); Lin Tun (penalty scored); Koné (penalty scored); Lin Aung (penalty scored)	5–4	(penalty scored) Khochalern; (penalty scored) Sihavong; (penalty scored) Inthilath; (penalty missed) Sayyabounsou; (penalty scored) Soundala

Gò Đậu Stadium, Thủ Dầu Một
Attendance: 6,000
Referee: Đinh Văn Dũng (Vietnam)
31 October 2014
20:00 UTC+7

Becamex Binh Duong (Vietnam)	5–2	(Cambodia) Phnom Penh Crown
Abass 2'; Trọng Hoàng 41'; Oseni 70'; Công Vinh 88'; Tăng Tuấn 90+1'	Report	Bosma 66'; Bisan 90+3'

Gò Đậu Stadium, Thủ Dầu Một
Attendance: 10,000
Referee: Surasak Kundiloksirom (Thailand)

=== 3rd place playoff ===
2 November 2014
13:30 UTC+7

Hoang Anh Attapeu (Laos)	0–2	(Cambodia) Phnom Penh Crown
	Report	Bisan 21', 52'

Gò Đậu Stadium, Thủ Dầu Một
Attendance: 4,000
Referee: Phùng Đình Dũng (Vietnam)

=== Final ===
2 November 2014
16:30 UTC+7

Becamex Binh Duong (Vietnam)	4–1	(Myanmar) Ayeyawady United
Oseni 5'; Anh Đức 45+2', 67'; Tấn Tài 74'	Report	Thiha Zaw 8'

Gò Đậu Stadium, Thủ Dầu Một
Attendance: 13,000
Referee: Suprem Nonthawong (Thailand)

== Winners ==
Mekong Club Championship 2016
Winners

Becamex Binh Duong
First Title

== Goalscorers ==
3 goals

- (Nigeria) George Bisan

2 goals

- (Vietnam) Nguyễn Anh Đức
- (Nigeria) Ganiyu Oseni

1 goals

- (South Korea) Shim Un-seob
- (Laos) Phonepaseuth Sysoutham
- (Senegal) Abass Cheikh Dieng
- (Vietnam) Nguyễn Trọng Hoàng
- (Netherlands) Koen Bosma
- (Vietnam) Lê Công Vinh
- (Vietnam) Nguyễn Tăng Tuấn
- (Myanmar) Thiha Zaw
- (Vietnam) Nguyễn Anh Đức
- (Vietnam) Lê Tấn Tài
