= Lembo Saysana =

Laotian footballer

Personal information
- Full name: Lembo Saysana
- Date of birth: February 12, 1995 (age 31)
- Place of birth: Laos
- Position: Forward

Senior career*
Years	Team	Apps	(Gls)
2013–14	Nong Khai	11	(0)
2015	Hoang Anh Attapeu	3	(0)
2016–2020	Electricite du Laos	?	(?)

International career^{‡}
2011–2013	Laos U-19	10	(6)
2015–?	Laos U-23	1	(0)
2014–?	Laos U-21	4	(0)
2014–2020	Laos	4	(0)
- * Club domestic league appearances and goals ‡ National team caps and goals as of 24 May 2014

Lembo Saysana (born 12 February 1995) is a Laotian professional footballer who played as a striker for the Laotian national team and Electricite du Laos.

In February 2020, the Asian Football Confederation banned him from football for life for match manipulation.
