= Electricite du Laos F.C. =

Electricite du Laos FC
- Full name: Electricite du Laos Football Club ສະໂມສອນໄຟຟ້າລາວ ເອຟຊີ
- Founded: 2015
- Ground: Lanexang Stadium
- Capacity: 4,000
- Chairman: Vithaya Inthirath
- Head Coach: Sonephet Chandavong
- League: Lao League
- 2016: Lao League, 4th

Electricite du Laos Football Club (Laos ສະໂມສອນໄຟຟ້າລາວ) is a professional football club based in Laos. They play in the top national football league in Laos, and finished ninth in the Lao Premier League. Their home stadium is Lanexang Stadium.

The club was founded in 2015.

== Players ==
Note: Flags indicate national team as defined under FIFA eligibility rules; some limited exceptions apply. Players may hold more than one non-FIFA nationality.

No.	Pos.	Nation	Player
1	GK	(Laos) LAO	Viengakhom Vilavong
4	MF	(Laos) LAO	Khampaseut Syphovong
5	DF	(Laos) LAO	Tounkham Nunthalungsy
6	DF	(Thailand) THA	Korawit Haingam
7	FW	(Laos) LAO	Thanongsak Homlatsamee
8	FW	(Brazil) BRA	Marcelo Reis
9	FW	(Laos) LAO	Visay Phaphouvanin
10	FW	(Republic of the Congo) CGO	Burnel Okana(Captain)
11	MF	(Laos) LAO	Lambo Saysana
12	DF	(Laos) LAO	Souvanvilai Youdthavong
15	DF	(Laos) LAO	Salath Vilaiphanh

No.	Pos.	Nation	Player
16	FW	(Laos) LAO	Lembo Saysana
17	MF	(Laos) LAO	Phonepaseuth Sysoutham
18	GK	(Laos) LAO	Sengaloun Sisombath
20	MF	(Uruguay) URU	Nicolas Nunez
22	DF	(Laos) LAO	Thothilath Sibounhuang
23	DF	(Laos) LAO	Samphansay Phoudthakoun
25	GK	(Laos) LAO	Phailakone Bounvixien
26	FW	(Laos) LAO	Sopha Saysana
32	MF	(Laos) LAO	Chanthaphone Waenvongsoth
34	DF	(Laos) LAO	Bounlien Bounpachack
