= Hong Pheng =

Cambodian footballer

Hong Pheng ហុង ផេង
Personal information
- Full name: Hong Pheng
- Date of birth: November 1, 1989 (age 37)
- Place of birth: Battambang, Cambodia
- Height: 1.75 m (5 ft 9 in)
- Position: Center back

Senior career*
Years	Team	Apps	(Gls)
2011	Baksey Chamkrong		
2011–2014	Phnom Penh Crown		
2014–2021	Boeung Ket		

International career^{‡}
2014–2018	Cambodia	24	(1)

Managerial career
- 2023–2024: Boeung Ket (interim)
- * Club domestic league appearances and goals ‡ National team caps and goals as of June 7, 2016

Hong Pheng (born 1 November 1989) is a Cambodian football manager and former player who last played as a center back and a team captain for Boeung Ket in the Cambodian League, and also the Cambodia national team. He currently serves as the team manager for Boeung Ket.

== Career ==
Hong Pheng started his career with Baksey Chamkrong, and after a couple impressive seasons joined Phnom Penh Crown in 2011. However, he had limited playing opportunities at the club, and three years later joined rivals Boeung Ket Angkor. Hong Pheng made his international debut against Malaysia on 20 September 2014.

== International career ==
Hong Pheng represented Cambodia at international level and scored his first goal for his country on 7 June 2016 in a 2019 AFC Asian Cup qualification match against Chinese Taipei.

=== International goals ===
As of match played 7 June 2016. Cambodia score listed first, score column indicates score after each Pheng goal.

International goals by date, venue, cap, opponent, score, result and competition
No.	Date	Venue	Cap	Opponent	Score	Result	Competition
1	7 June 2016	Olympic Stadium, Phnom Penh, Cambodia	14	Chinese Taipei	1–0	2–0	2019 AFC Asian Cup qualification

== Honours ==
=== Club ===
Phnom Penh Crown

- Cambodian League: 2011, 2014
- 2011 AFC President's Cup: Runner up
- 2014 Mekong Club Championship: Third Place

Boeung Ket

- Cambodian League: 2016, 2017, 2020
- 2015 Mekong Club Championship: Runner up
- Hun Sen Cup: 2019

Individual

- ASEAN All-Stars: 2014
