= Bounthavy Sipasong =

Laotian footballer

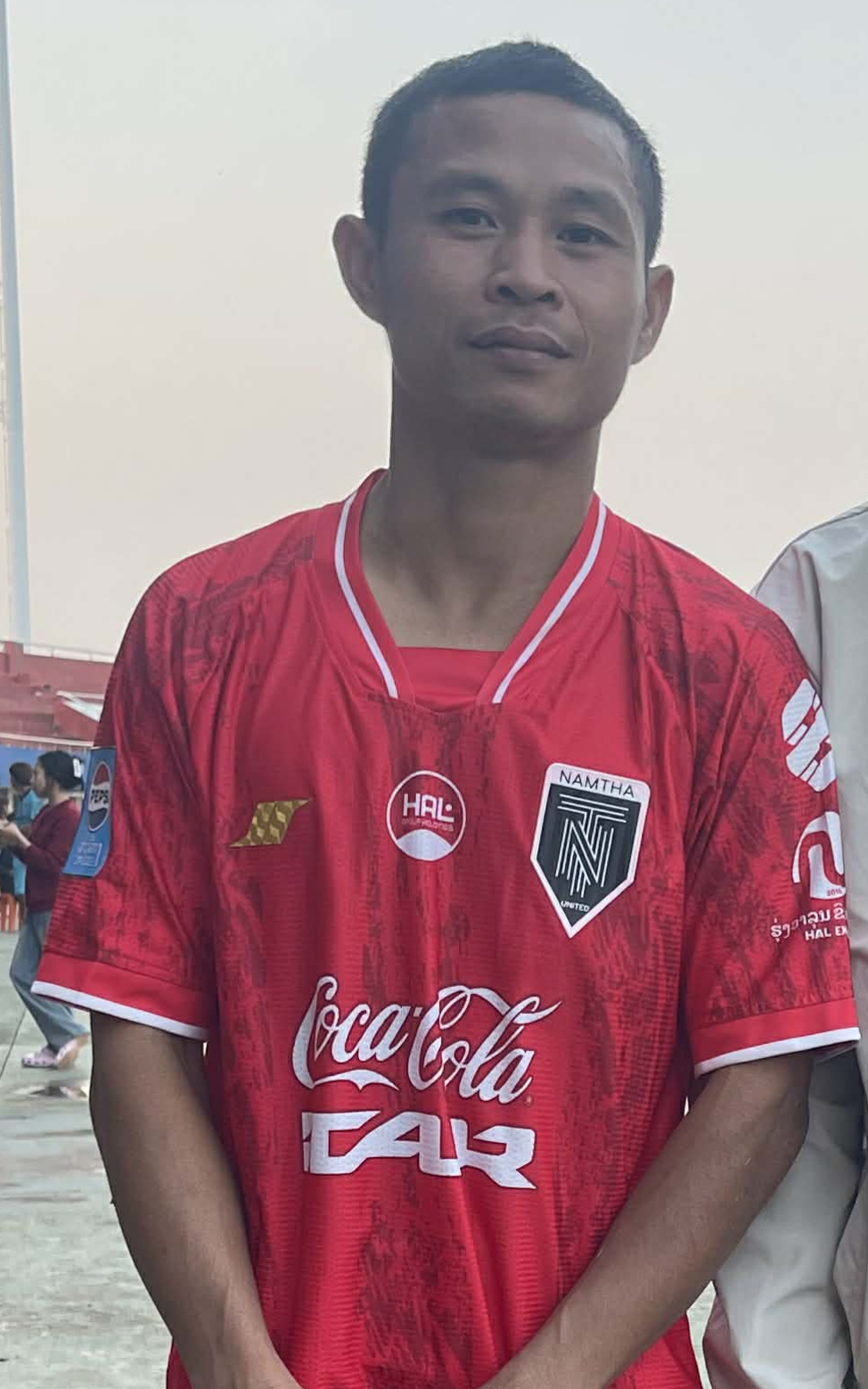
- Bounthavy in 2026

Personal information
- Full name: Bounthavy Sipasong
- Date of birth: 4 June 1996 (age 30)
- Place of birth: Vientiane, Laos
- Height: 1.56 m (5 ft 1 in)
- Positions: Defensive midfielder; right-back

Team information
- Current team: Namtha United
- Number: 13

Senior career*
Years	Team	Apps	(Gls)
2013-2015	Hoang Anh Attapeu		
2017–2018	Lao Toyota F.C.		
2019–2022	Master 7	28	(2)
2023–2024	Ezra	10	(0)
2024–2025	Master	13	(0)
2025–	Namtha United	13	(1)

International career
2017	Laos U-23	3	(0)
2014–2018	Laos	9	(0)
- * Club domestic league appearances and goals

Bounthavy Sipasong (Lao: ບຸນທະວີ ສີປະສົງ; born 4 June 1996) is a Laotian professional footballer who plays as a central defensive midfielder for Namtha United in Lao League 1.

Played for the Laos national under-23 football team in the 2015 SEA Games, he was investigated by the Corrupt Practices Investigation Bureau of Singapore after his absence from the match against Malaysia under-23 football team on suspicion of match-fixing. He also played for the national team.
