= Vanna Bounlovongsa =

Laotian association football player

Personal information
- Date of birth: 21 November 1998 (age 27)
- Place of birth: Luang Prabang, Laos
- Height: 1.68 m (5 ft 6 in)
- Position: Defender

Team information
- Current team: Lao Army
- Number: 32

Senior career*
Years	Team	Apps	(Gls)
2018	Luang Prabang United		
2019–2021	Young Elephant F.C	11	(0)
2021	F.C Chanthabouly	2	(0)
2022–2023	Viengchanh	16	(1)
2023–2024	HBT 941	0	(0)
2025–	Lao Army	17	(6)

International career
2018–2023	Laos	9	(0)
- * Club domestic league appearances and goals as of 20:12, 21 January 2019 (UTC)

Vanna Bounlovongsa (born 21 November 1998) is a Laotian footballer who plays as a defender for Lao League 1 club Lao Army. He has appeared for the Laos national football team.

== Career statistics ==
=== International ===
As of matches played 21 January 2019.

National team	Year	Apps	Goals
Laos	2018	4	0
Total		4	0
