= Um Vichet =

Cambodian footballer

Um Vichet អ៊ុំ វិចិត្រ
Personal information
- Full name: Um Vichet
- Date of birth: November 27, 1990 (age 35)
- Place of birth: Phnom Penh, Cambodia
- Height: 1.77 m (5 ft 10 in)
- Position: Goalkeeper

Team information
- Current team: Phnom Penh Crown
- Number: 22

Youth career
- National Defense Ministry

Senior career*
| Years | Team | Apps | (Gls) |
| 2008–2019 | National Defense Ministry | | |
| 2020–2021 | Phnom Penh Crown | 18 | (0) |
| 2022 | Tiffy Army | 14 | (0) |
| 2023– | Phnom Penh Crown | 37 | (0) |

International career^{‡}
| 2011 | Cambodia U19 | 4 | (0) |
| 2014 | Cambodia U21 | 4 | (0) |
| 2011 | Cambodia U23 | 1 | (0) |
| 2011– | Cambodia | 7 | (0) |

Managerial career
- 2022: Tiffy Army (Goalkeeper coach)
- * Club domestic league appearances and goals as of 2 November 2026 ‡ National team caps and goals as of 17 March 2016

Um Vichet (Khmer: អ៊ុំ វិចិត្រ, romanized: ’Ŭm Vĭchĕt; born 27 November 1990) is a Cambodian professional footballer who plays as a goalkeeper for Cambodian Premier League club Phnom Penh Crown and the Cambodia national team. His younger brother Um Sereyroth is also a footballer who also plays as a goalkeeper.

== International career ==
Vichet made his senior debut in the 2012 AFF Suzuki Cup qualification phase against Brunei.

== Honours ==
=== Club ===
National Defense Ministry

- Hun Sen Cup: 2016,2018

Phnom Penh Crown

- Cambodian Premier League: 2021
- Hun Sen Cup: 2024–25
- Cambodian League Cup: 2023
- Cambodian Super Cup: 2023

=== Individual ===
- Hun Sen Cup: 2024–25 Golden glove
