= Somxay Keohanam =

Laotian footballer (born 1998)

Personal information
- Full name: Somxay Keohanam
- Date of birth: 27 July 1998 (age 28)
- Place of birth: Champasak, Laos
- Height: 1.79 m (5 ft 10 in)
- Position: Forward

Team information
- Current team: Young Elephants
- Number: 10

Senior career*
Years	Team	Apps	(Gls)
2015–2017	Ezra		
2018–	Young Elephants	39	(9)

International career
2017–	Laos	11	(1)
- * Club domestic league appearances and goals as of 20:12, 21 January 2019 (UTC)

Somxay Keohanam (born 27 July 1998) is a Laotian professional footballer currently playing as a forward. for Lao League 1 club, Young Elephants

== Career statistics ==
=== International ===
As of matches played 21 January 2019.

National team	Year	Apps	Goals
Laos	2017	4	0
Laos	2018	7	1
Total		11	1

=== International goals ===
Scores and results list Laos' goal tally first.

No	Date	Venue	Opponent	Score	Result	Competition
1.	20 November 2018	Phnom Penh Olympic Stadium, Phnom Penh, Cambodia	Cambodia	1–2	1–3	2018 AFF Championship
