= Nguyễn Trọng Hoàng =

Vietnamese footballer

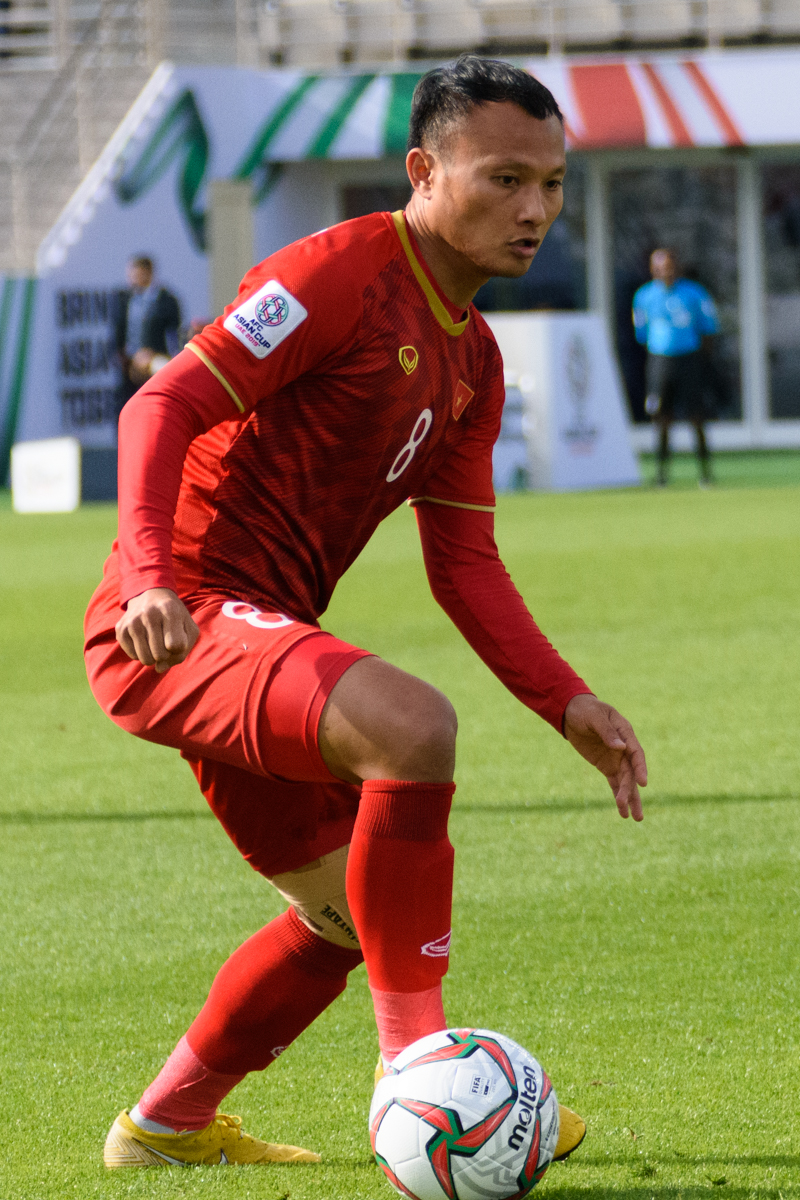
- Trọng Hoàng playing for Vietnam at the 2019 AFC Asian Cup

Personal information
- Full name: Nguyễn Trọng Hoàng
- Date of birth: 14 April 1989 (age 37)
- Place of birth: Nghi Xuân, Hà Tĩnh, Vietnam
- Height: 1.72 m (5 ft 8 in)
- Positions: Right winger; right back

Team information
- Current team: Hồng Lĩnh Hà Tĩnh
- Number: 8

Youth career
- 2003–2007: Sông Lam Nghệ An

Senior career*
Years	Team	Apps	(Gls)
2007–2013	Sông Lam Nghệ An	130	(37)
2014–2016	Becamex Bình Dương	39	(13)
2016–2019	FLC Thanh Hóa	36	(4)
2019–2022	Viettel	34	(4)
2022–2024	Sông Lam Nghệ An	23	(1)
2024–	Hồng Lĩnh Hà Tĩnh	56	(3)

International career
2009–2012	Vietnam U23	15	(5)
2009–2022	Vietnam	74	(12)
Medal record
Men's football
Representing Vietnam
AFF Championship
Winner	ASEAN 2018
SEA Games
Silver medal – second place	2009 Vientiane
Gold medal – first place	2019 Philippines
- * Club domestic league appearances and goals as of 7 June 2026

Nguyễn Trọng Hoàng (born 14 April 1989) is a Vietnamese professional footballer who plays as a right winger or a right back for V.League 1 club Hồng Lĩnh Hà Tĩnh. He is a former player for the Vietnam national team and the fourth most capped player of their history. He is widely considered by the Vietnamese press as one of the most talented players of his generation.

== Club career ==
After the departure of Lê Công Vinh to Hà Nội T&T F.C. in 2009, Trọng Hoàng was given Công Vinh's number 9 and since then, he has become an important part of Sông Lam Nghệ An. His performance helped the club finished third in the 2009 V-League and won 2010 Vietnamese Cup title.

In the financial turmoil that affected most V-League clubs after the 2012 season, Sông Lam Nghệ An was unable to arrange a financial contract with Trọng Hoàng. After his contract expired, he joined Becamex Bình Dương as a free agent in 2013. With the Southern Vietnamese side, he won two consecutive V.League 1 titles in 2014 and 2015.

In November 2016, Trọng Hoàng joined FLC Thanh Hóa, signing a three-year contract and earning one of the biggest wage in the league.

In 2019, Trọng Hoàng signed for the newly promoted V.League 1 club Viettel, signing a three-year contract. He was part of the squad that won the 2020 V.League 1, making 12 appearances during the season. He was also named in the V.League Team of the season.

In January 2022, Trọng Hoàng returned back to Sông Lam Nghệ An and was named as the team vice-captain. His second spell with the team was marked by several months of absents due to disc herniation.

In February 2024, Trọng Hoàng terminated his contract with Sông Lam Nghệ An and joined V.League 1 fellow Hồng Lĩnh Hà Tĩnh in a free transfer.

== International career ==
In 2007, Trọng Hoàng was in Alfred Riedl's plan for the 2007 Southeast Asian Games. However, he was left out because he had to take the final exam for his high school studies.

In 2009, Trọng Hoàng was again chosen to play in the 2009 Southeast Asian Games by Henrique Calisto. Trọng Hoàng scored in the third game of the tournament against Malaysia. However, he was injured when he played against Cambodia, which prevented him from playing in the semi-final. In the tournament's final, Trọng Hoàng came on as the substitute but the team lost against Malaysia in the final and received the silver medal. Despite the loss, the team's performance in the tournament was impressive enough that Trọng Hoàng is one of the few players who were called up to play in the national team.

In 2010, he was again chosen to play in the 2010 Asian Games in Guangzhou, in which he scored two goals against Turkmenistan and Bahrain to help Vietnam proceed into the second round for the first time in history. The team lost to North Korea, but he was then selected to play in the 2010 AFF Suzuki Cup. In the first game, Trọng Hoàng scored two goals against Myanmar after he came on at the 72–minute. The team came on to win 7–1.

== International statistics ==
Appearances and goals by national team and year
National team	Year	Apps	Goals
Vietnam	2009	3	1
Vietnam	2010	10	2
Vietnam	2011	5	1
Vietnam	2012	12	3
Vietnam	2013	4	3
Vietnam	2014	2	1
Vietnam	2015	3	0
Vietnam	2016	8	1
Vietnam	2017	2	0
Vietnam	2018	8	0
Vietnam	2019	12	0
Vietnam	2021	5	0
Total		74	12

== International goals ==
=== Vietnam U-23 ===
#	Date	Venue	Opponent	Score	Result	Competition
1.	6 December 2009	New Laos National Stadium, Vientiane, Laos	Malaysia	3–1	3–1	2009 Southeast Asian Games
2.	8 November 2010	Guangdong Provincial People's Stadium, Guangzhou, China	Bahrain	2–0	3–1	2010 Asian Games
3.	10 November 2010	Guangdong Provincial People's Stadium, Guangzhou, China	Turkmenistan	1–6	2–6	2010 Asian Games
4.	28 November 2019	Biñan Stadium, Biñan, Philippines	Laos	5–1	6–1	2019 Southeast Asian Games

=== Vietnam ===
Scores and results list Vietnam's goal tally first.

#	Date	Venue	Opponent	Score	Result	Competition
1.	31 May 2009	Al-Sadaqua Walsalam Stadium, Kuwait City, Kuwait	Kuwait	1–0	1–0	Friendly
2.	3 December 2010	Mỹ Đình National Stadium, Hanoi, Vietnam	Myanmar	5–1	7–1	2010 AFF Championship
3.	3 December 2010	Mỹ Đình National Stadium, Hanoi, Vietnam	Myanmar	6–1	7–1	2010 AFF Championship
4.	28 July 2011	Mỹ Đình National Stadium, Hanoi, Vietnam	Qatar	1–1	2–1	2014 FIFA World Cup qualification
5.	10 June 2012	Mong Kok Stadium, Mong Kok, Hong Kong	Hong Kong	2–1	2–1	Friendly
6.	26 October 2012	Thống Nhất Stadium, Ho Chi Minh City, Vietnam	Laos	3–0	4–0	2012 VFF Cup
7.	3 November 2012	Mỹ Đình National Stadium, Hanoi, Vietnam	Malaysia	1–0	1–0	Friendly
8.	9 October 2013	Thani bin Jassim Stadium, Doha, Qatar	Qatar	1–1	2–1	Friendly
9.	9 October 2013	Thani bin Jassim Stadium, Doha, Qatar	Qatar	2–1	2–1	Friendly
10.	15 October 2013	Pakhtakor Central Stadium, Tashkent, Uzbekistan	Uzbekistan	1–2	1–3	2015 AFC Asian Cup qualification
11.	5 March 2014	Mỹ Đình National Stadium, Hanoi, Vietnam	Hong Kong	3–1	3–1	2015 AFC Asian Cup qualification
12.	23 November 2016	Thuwunna Stadium, Yangon, Myanmar	Malaysia	1–0	1–0	2016 AFF Championship

== Honours ==
Sông Lam Nghệ An

- V.League 1: 2011
- Vietnamese Super Cup: 2011
- Vietnamese National Cup: 2010

Becamex Bình Dương

- V.League 1: 2014, 2015
- Vietnamese Super Cup: 2014, 2015
- Vietnamese National Cup: 2015; runner-up: 2014
- Mekong Club Championship: 2014

Viettel

- V.League 1: 2020

Vietnam

- AFF Championship: 2018
- King's Cup runners-up: 2019

Vietnam U23

- SEA Games gold medal: 2019; silver medal: 2009

Individual

- AFF Championship Best XI: 2016
- ASEAN Football Federation Best XI: 2017
