= Sonevilay Sihavong =

Laotian association football player

Personal information
- Full name: Sonevilay Sihavong
- Date of birth: 18 August 1996 (age 30)
- Place of birth: Laos
- Position: Defender

Team information
- Current team: Laos U17 (Head Coach)

Senior career*
Years	Team	Apps	(Gls)
2014	Hoang Anh Attapeu		
2015–17	Young Elephant F.C		
2016-2017	Lanexang United		
2018	Master 7 FC		
2019	Young Elephants FC		
2022	Lao Army		

International career
2018	Laos	2	(0)

Managerial career
- 2022: Laos U16 (Assistants)
- 2025–: Laos U17
- * Club domestic league appearances and goals as of 20:12, 21 January 2019 (UTC)

Sonevilay Sihavong (born 18 August 1996), is a Laotian footballer currently playing as a defender.

== Career statistics ==
=== International ===
As of matches played 21 January 2019.

National team	Year	Apps	Goals
Laos	2018	2	0
Total		2	0
