= Phouthone Innalay =

Laotian footballer

Personal information
- Date of birth: 10 October 1993 (age 33)
- Place of birth: Vientiane, Laos
- Height: 1.70 m (5 ft 7 in)
- Position: Midfielder

Team information
- Current team: Lao Army

Senior career*
Years	Team	Apps	(Gls)
2014	Lanexang United		
2015–2016	Lao Army		
2017	Lao Toyota		
2018–	Lao Army		

International career
2015–	Laos	20	(1)
- * Club domestic league appearances and goals as of 20:12, 21 January 2019 (UTC)

Phouthone Innalay (born 10 October 1993), is a Laotian footballer currently playing as a midfielder.

== Career statistics ==
=== International ===
As of matches played 21 January 2019.

National team	Year	Apps	Goals
Laos	2015	5	0
Laos	2016	6	0
Laos	2017	0	0
Laos	2018	9	1
Total		20	1

=== International goals ===
Scores and results list Laos' goal tally first.

No	Date	Venue	Opponent	Score	Result	Competition
1.	16 November 2018	New Laos National Stadium, Vientiane, Laos	Myanmar	1–0	1–3	2018 AFF Championship
