= Nguyễn Anh Đức =

Vietnamese footballer (born 1985)

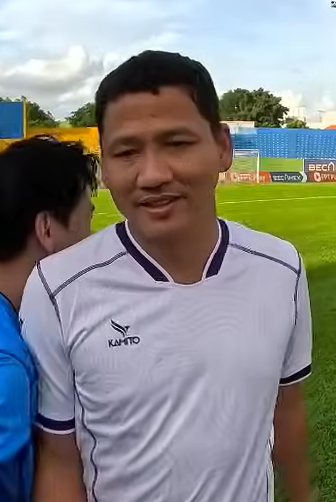
- Anh Đức in 2024

Personal information
- Full name: Nguyễn Anh Đức
- Date of birth: 24 October 1985 (age 41)
- Place of birth: Sông Bé, Bình Dương, Vietnam
- Height: 1.81 m (5 ft 11 in)
- Position: Forward

Team information
- Current team: Thanh Hóa (head coach)

Youth career
- 2000–2004: Becamex Binh Duong

Senior career*
Years	Team	Apps	(Gls)
2004–2005	Dong A Bank	9	(7)
2006–2019	Becamex Binh Duong	355	(116)
2020	Hoang Anh Gia Lai	9	(0)
2021–2022	Long An	11	(7)
Total		384	(130)

International career
2005–2018	Vietnam U23	35	(13)
2006–2019	Vietnam	37	(12)

Managerial career
- 2021–2022: Long An (player-assistant)
- 2022: Vietnam (assistant)
- 2023: Long An
- 2023–2025: Trường Tươi Bình Phước
- 2025: Becamex Hồ Chí Minh City
- 2026–: Thanh Hóa
Medal record
Men's football
Representing Vietnam
AFF Championship
Winner	ASEAN 2018	Team
- * Club domestic league appearances and goals

Nguyễn Anh Đức (born 24 October 1985) is a Vietnamese professional football manager and former player. He is currently the head coach of V.League 1 side Thanh Hóa.

He played for Becamex Bình Dương for the majority of his career. He is also a former member of the Vietnam national football team, being part of the 2018 AFF Championship winning team. He was awarded the Vietnamese Golden Ball in 2015.

== International career ==
Anh Đức made his debut for Vietnam in 2006. In June 2007, he was named in Vietnam final squad that participated in the 2007 AFC Asian Cup.

Anh Đức was a key player for Vietnam in their 2018 AFF Championship victorious campaign. He scored four goals in the tournament, including the winning goal in the second leg of the final against Malaysia at Mỹ Đình National Stadium. However, Anh Đức was not called up for the 2019 AFC Asian Cup. On 27 May 2019, he was recalled to the Vietnam national team to compete in the 2019 King's Cup in Thailand in June 2019.

On 19 November 2019, And Đức announced his international retirement after the 2022 World Cup qualifiers game between Vietnam and Thailand.

== Career statistics ==
=== International ===
Appearances and goals by national team and year
National team	Year	Apps	Goals
Vietnam	2006	4	0
Vietnam	2007	6	2
Vietnam	2010	5	2
Vietnam	2012	1	0
Vietnam	2013	4	0
Vietnam	2014	4	1
Vietnam	2017	2	1
Vietnam	2018	7	5
Vietnam	2019	4	1
Total		37	12

==== Vietnam Olympic ====
No	Date	Venue	Opponent	Score	Result	Competition
1.	8 November 2010	Guangdong Provincial People's Stadium, Guangzhou, China	Bahrain	3–0	3–1	2010 Asian Games
2.	10 November 2010	Guangdong Provincial People's Stadium, Guangzhou, China	Turkmenistan	2–6	2-6	2010 Asian Games
3.	3 August 2018	Mỹ Đình National Stadium, Hanoi, Vietnam	Palestine	1-1	2-1	Vinaphone Cup 2018
4.	16 August 2018	Wibawa Mukti Stadium, Cikarang, Indonesia	Nepal	1–0	2-0	2018 Asian Games

==== Vietnam ====
Scores and results list Vietnam's goal tally first.

No	Date	Venue	Opponent	Score	Result	Competition
1.	24 June 2007	Mỹ Đình National Stadium, Hanoi, Vietnam	Jamaica	3–0	3–0	Friendly
2.	30 June 2007	Mỹ Đình National Stadium, Hanoi, Vietnam	Bahrain	5–3	5–3	Friendly
3.	2 December 2010	Mỹ Đình National Stadium, Hanoi, Vietnam	Myanmar	1–0	7–1	2010 AFF Championship
4.	2 December 2010	Mỹ Đình National Stadium, Hanoi, Vietnam	Myanmar	4–1	7–1	2010 AFF Championship
5.	5 March 2014	Mỹ Đình National Stadium, Hanoi, Vietnam	Hong Kong	2–0	3–1	2015 AFC Asian Cup qualification
6.	10 October 2017	Mỹ Đình National Stadium, Hanoi, Vietnam	Cambodia	3–0	5–0	2019 AFC Asian Cup qualification
7.	27 March 2018	King Abdullah II Stadium, Amman, Jordan	Jordan	1–0	1–1	2019 AFC Asian Cup qualification
8.	8 November 2018	New Laos National Stadium, Vientiane, Laos	Laos	2–0	3–0	2018 AFF Championship
9.	16 November 2018	Mỹ Đình National Stadium, Hanoi, Vietnam	Malaysia	2–0	2–0	2018 AFF Championship
10.	2 December 2018	Panaad Stadium, Bacolod, Philippines	Philippines	1–0	2–1	2018 AFF Championship
11.	16 December 2018	Mỹ Đình National Stadium, Hanoi, Vietnam	Malaysia	1–0	1–0	2018 AFF Championship
12.	5 June 2019	Chang Arena, Buriram, Thailand	Thailand	1–0	1–0	2019 King's Cup

== Honours ==
Becamex Bình Dương

- V.League 1: 2007, 2008, 2014, 2015
- Vietnamese National Cup: 2015, 2018
- Vietnamese Super Cup: 2007, 2008, 2014, 2015
- Mekong Club Championship: 2014

Vietnam Olympic

- VFF Cup: 2018
- Asian Games fourth place: 2018

Vietnam

- AFF Championship: 2018
- King's Cup runners-up: 2019

Individual

- Vietnamese Golden Ball: 2015
- V.League 1 top scorer: 2017
- V.League 1 Player of the season: 2014, 2015
