= Outthilath Nammakhoth =

Laotian footballer

Personal information
- Full name: Outthilath Nammakhoth
- Date of birth: 13 September 1996 (age 30)
- Place of birth: Savannakhet, Laos
- Height: 1.86 m (6 ft 1 in)
- Position: Goalkeeper

Team information
- Current team: BIS Master
- Number: 1

Senior career*
Years	Team	Apps	(Gls)
2014–2015	Hoang Anh Attapeu		
2016	Hoàng Anh Gia Lai		
2017	Savannakhet		
2018	Master 7		
2019	Lao Toyota		
2020–2021	Rayong	1	(0)
2021	Chanthabouly	1	(0)
2022–2025	Young Elephants	13	(0)
2025–	BIS Master	0	(0)

International career
2017–2019	Laos	5	(0)
- * Club domestic league appearances and goals

Outthilath Nammakhoth (born 13 September 1996) is a Laotian professional footballer currently playing as a goalkeeper for Lao League 1 club BIS Master.

== Career statistics ==
=== International ===
As of matches played 11 November 2018.

National team	Year	Apps	Goals
Laos	2017	2	0
Laos	2018	3	0
Total		5	0
