= Chanthaphone Waenvongsoth =

Laotian footballer

Personal information
- Date of birth: November 4, 1994 (age 32)
- Place of birth: Vientiane, Laos
- Height: 1.70 m (5 ft 7 in)
- Position: Attacking midfielder

Team information
- Current team: Young Elephants
- Number: 32

Senior career*
Years	Team	Apps	(Gls)
2013–2015	Hoang Anh Attapeu	39	(1)
2015–2017	Electricite du Laos	39	(1)
2018	Nan		
2019	Khon Kaen		
2019–2021	FC Chanthabouly		
2022–	Young Elephants		

International career^{‡}
2013–	Laos	6	(0)
- * Club domestic league appearances and goals ‡ National team caps and goals as of 18 October 2016

Chanthaphone Waenvongsoth (born 4 November 1994) is a Laotian footballer who plays as an attacking midfielder for Young Elephants FC and the national team. He made his first appearance for the Laos national football team in 2013.
