= Félix Dalmás =

Argentinian association football player

Personal information
- Full name: Félix Agustín González Dalmás
- Date of birth: 2 February 1988 (age 38)
- Place of birth: Buenos Aires, Argentina
- Height: 1.81 m (5 ft 11 1/2 in)
- Position: Midfielder

Senior career*
Years	Team	Apps	(Gls)
2010	Laranja Kyoto	4	(0)
2011–2012	SP Kyoto	15	(1)
2013	Laranja Kyoto		
2013–2014	Plaza Colonia	4	(0)
Total		23	(1)

Managerial career
- 2018–2020: Cambodia
- 2019–2020: Cambodia U23
- 2023–2024: Cambodia
- 2023–2024: Cambodia U23
- * Club domestic league appearances and goals

Félix Agustín González Dalmás is an Argentine Football coach and former football player. He was the head coach of Cambodia until September 13th, 2024.

Felix received a master's degree in Sports Management from Johan Cruyff Institute in 2022.

== Managerial career ==
Dalmás joined Keisuke Honda as his assistant coach for Cambodia. At the time, Honda was still a competitive player, and Dalmás would take over when Honda was on the road.

In March 2023, Football Federation of Cambodia (FFC) announced Dalmás signed a four-year contract to coach both the Cambodia senior football team and the under-23 team.

On 13 September 2024, Dalmás was relieved of his position.

== Career statistics ==
=== Club ===
Club	Season	League			Cup		Other		Total	
Club	Season	Division	Apps	Goals	Apps	Goals	Apps	Goals	Apps	Goals
Laranja Kyoto	2010	Kansai Soccer League	4	0	0	0	0	0	4	0
SP Kyoto	2011	JFL	6	1	0	0	0	0	6	1
SP Kyoto	2012	JFL	9	0	0	0	0	0	9	0
SP Kyoto	Total		15	1	0	0	0	0	15	1
Plaza Colonia	2013–14	Uruguayan Segunda División	4	0	0	0	0	0	4	0
Career total			23	1	0	0	0	0	23	1

=== Managerial ===
As of 10 September 2024

Managerial record by team and tenure
Team	From	To	Record				
Team	From	To	P	W	D	L	Win %
Cambodia	August 2018	August 2020	13	3	2	8	23.1
Cambodia	March 2023	Present	12	2	4	6	16.7
Total			25	5	6	14	20.0
