= Aphixay Thanakhanty =

Laotian association football player

Personal information
- Date of birth: 15 July 1998 (age 28)
- Place of birth: Savannakhet, Laos
- Height: 1.72 m (5 ft 8 in)
- Positions: Centre back; right back

Team information
- Current team: Salavan United
- Number: 24

Senior career*
| Years | Team | Apps | (Gls) |
| 2016–2017 | Ezra | | |
| 2018 | Master 7 | | |
| 2019–2022 | Young Elephants | 28 | (1) |
| 2023 | Ezra | 8 | (0) |
| 2024–2025 | Master | 13 | (3) |
| 2025–2026 | Young Elephants | 16 | (2) |
| 2026– | Salavan United | 0 | (0) |

International career
| 2018–2023 | Laos | 8 | (0) |
- * Club domestic league appearances and goals

Aphixay Thanakhanty (born 15 July 1998) is a Laotian professional footballer who plays as a centre back or right back for Lao League 1 club Salavan United.

== Career statistics ==
=== International ===
As of matches played 21 January 2019.

| National team | Year | Apps | Goals |
|---|---|---|---|
| Laos | 2018 | 5 | 0 |
| Total | | 5 | 0 |
