= Chansamone Phommalivong =

Laotian association football player

Personal information
- Date of birth: 6 April 1998 (age 28)
- Place of birth: Vientiane, Laos
- Position: Defender

Team information
- Current team: HBT 941
- Number: 33

Senior career*
| Years | Team | Apps | (Gls) |
| 2017 | Vientiane | | |
| 2018– | Young Elephants | | |
| 2019 | Master 7 F.C | | |
| 2021 | FC Chanthabouly | | |
| 2022- | HBT 941 | | |

International career
| 2018– | Laos | 5 | (0) |
- * Club domestic league appearances and goals as of 20:12, 21 January 2019 (UTC)

Chansamone Phommalivong (born 6 April 1998), is a Laotian footballer currently playing as a defender.

== Career statistics ==
=== International ===
As of matches played 21 January 2019.

| National team | Year | Apps | Goals |
|---|---|---|---|
| Laos | 2018 | 5 | 0 |
| Total | | 5 | 0 |
