= Phonepaseuth Sysoutham =

Laotian footballer

Personal information
- Full name: Phonepaseuth Sysoutham
- Date of birth: May 28, 1990 (age 36)
- Place of birth: Laos
- Position: Midfielder

Senior career*
Years	Team	Apps	(Gls)
- Vientiane FC

International career^{‡}
2010–	Laos	6	(0)
- * Club domestic league appearances and goals ‡ National team caps and goals as of 30 December 2012

Phonepaseuth Sysoutham is a Laotian footballer who plays as a midfielder.
