= Saymanolinh Paseuth =

Laotian footballer

Personal information
- Date of birth: 19 July 1999 (age 27)
- Place of birth: Vientiane, Laos
- Height: 1.70 m (5 ft 7 in)
- Position: Goalkeeper

Team information
- Current team: Young Elephants

Senior career*
Years	Team	Apps	(Gls)
2015	Young Elephants		
2016–2017	Lao Toyota		
2018–	Young Elephants		

International career
2017–	Laos	9	(0)
- * Club domestic league appearances and goals as of 20:12, 21 January 2019 (UTC)

Saymanolinh Paseuth (born 19 July 1999), is a Laotian footballer currently playing as a goalkeeper.

== Career statistics ==
=== International ===
As of matches played 21 January 2019.

National team	Year	Apps	Goals
Laos	2018	2	0
Laos	2017	7	0
Total		9	0
