= Phithack Kongmathilath =

Laotian footballer

Personal information
- Date of birth: 6 August 1996 (age 30)
- Place of birth: Vientiane, Laos
- Height: 1.65 m (5 ft 5 in)
- Positions: Attacking midfielder; winger

Team information
- Current team: Salavan United
- Number: 22

Senior career*
Years	Team	Apps	(Gls)
2015–2017	Lanexang United		
2017–2018	Lao Army		
2019–2020	Ayutthaya United	25	(1)
2020–2021	Chanthabouly	18	(10)
2021–2022	Nakhon Pathom United	18	(0)
2023–2026	Young Elephants	27	(3)
2026–	Salavan United	0	(0)

International career
2017–2024	Laos	24	(6)
- * Club domestic league appearances and goals as of 30 April 2022 (UTC)

Phithack Kongmathilath (Lao: ພິທັກ ກອງມາທິລາດ; born 6 August 1996) is a Laotian professional footballer who currently plays as an attacking midfielder or a winger for Salavan United in the Lao League 1 and he played for the Laos national team.

Phithack is also the first Laotian footballer to win the Thai League 2 title.

== Club career ==
On 23 December 2021, Phithack joined Thai League 2 club Nakhon Pathom United. He helped the club to win the 2022–23 Thai League 2 title which sees the club earned promotion to the top flight.

== Honour ==
Nakhon Pathom United

- Thai League 2: 2022–23

== Career statistics ==
=== International ===
As of matches played 14 November 2024.

National team	Year	Apps	Goals
Laos	2017	5	1
Laos	2018	10	4
Laos	2019	0	0
Laos	2020	0	0
Laos	2021	0	0
Laos	2022	8	1
Laos	2023	0	0
Laos	2024	1	0
Total		24	6

=== International goals ===
Scores and results list Laos' goal tally first.

No	Date	Venue	Opponent	Score	Result	Competition
1.	2 October 2017	Taipei Municipal Stadium, Taipei, Taiwan	Philippines	1–3	1–3	Friendly
2.	27 March 2018	New Laos National Stadium, Vientiane, Laos	Bangladesh	1–0	2–2	Friendly
3.	27 March 2018	New Laos National Stadium, Vientiane, Laos	Bangladesh	2–0	2–2	Friendly
4.	3 October 2018	Sylhet District Stadium, Sylhet, Bangladesh	Philippines	1–3	1–3	2018 Bangabandhu Cup
5.	12 November 2018	Bukit Jalil National Stadium, Kuala Lumpur, Malaysia	Malaysia	1–0	1–3	2018 AFF Championship
6.	27 March 2022	New Laos National Stadium, Vientiane, Laos	Brunei	3–0	3–2	Friendly
