= Keo Soksela =

Cambodian footballer (born 1997)

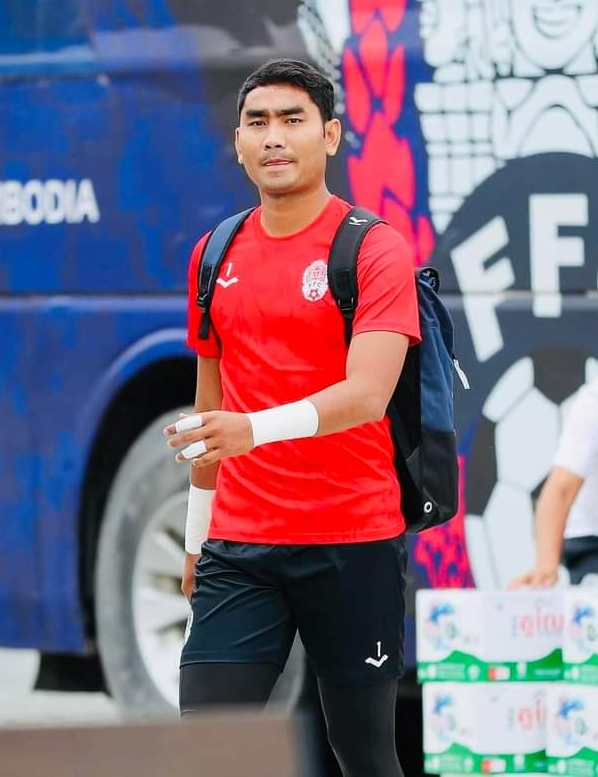

Personal information
- Full name: Keo Soksela
- Date of birth: 1 August 1997 (age 29)
- Place of birth: Phnom Penh, Cambodia
- Height: 1.85 m (6 ft 1 in)
- Position: Goalkeeper

Team information
- Current team: Visakha
- Number: 1

Youth career
- 2011–2015: Phnom Penh Crown

Senior career*
Years	Team	Apps	(Gls)
2015–2018	Phnom Penh Crown	30	(0)
2018–	Visakha	145	(0)

International career^{‡}
2016	Cambodia U19	3	(0)
2017	Cambodia U22	2	(0)
2019	Cambodia U23	2	(0)
2018–	Cambodia	27	(0)
Medal record
Men's football
Representing Cambodia
FIFA ASEAN Challenge Cup
Runner-up	2026 Hong Kong
- * Club domestic league appearances and goals as of 9 November 2026 ‡ National team caps and goals as of 5 October 2026

Keo Soksela (Khmer: កែវ សុខសិលា; born 1 August 1997) is a Cambodian professional footballer who plays as goalkeeper for Cambodian Premier League club Visakha and the Cambodia national team.

== International career ==
Soksela made his senior debut in a friendly match against Timor-Leste on 12 October 2018.

== Career statistics ==
=== International ===
As of match played 4 June 2026

Appearances and goals by national team and year
National team	Year	Apps	Goals
Cambodia	2018	2	0
Cambodia	2019	8	0
Cambodia	2020	–	
Cambodia	2021	6	0
Cambodia	2022	4	0
Cambodia	2023	2	0
Cambodia	2024	–	
Cambodia	2025	1	0
Cambodia	2026	1	0
Total		24	0

== Honours ==
=== Club ===
Phnom Penh Crown

- Cambodian League: 2015

Visakha

- Hun Sen Cup: 2020, 2021, 2022

=== Individual ===
- Cambodian League: 2015 : Best Goalkeeper
