= Lathasay Lounlasy =

Laotian association football player

Personal information
- Date of birth: 29 March 1998 (age 28)
- Place of birth: Vientiane, Laos
- Height: 1.78 m (5 ft 10 in)
- Position: Midfielder

Team information
- Current team: Viengchanh

Senior career*
Years	Team	Apps	(Gls)
2017–2018	Lao Toyota		
2018-2020	Young Elephants		
2021	FC Chanthabouly		
2022	Muanghat United		
2022-	Viengchanh		

International career
2017–	Laos	15	(0)
- * Club domestic league appearances and goals as of 20:12, 21 January 2019 (UTC)

Lathasay Lounlasy (born 29 March 1998), is a Laotian footballer currently playing as a midfielder.

== Career statistics ==
=== International ===
As of matches played 21 January 2019.

National team	Year	Apps	Goals
Laos	2017	6	0
Laos	2018	9	0
Total		15	0
