= Thothilath Sibounhuang =

Laotian footballer

Personal information
- Date of birth: November 5, 1990 (age 35)
- Place of birth: Vientiane, Laos
- Position: Defender

Team information
- Current team: Bolikhamxay

Youth career
- 2014: Electricite Du Laos FC

Senior career*
Years	Team	Apps	(Gls)
2016	Electricite Du Laos FC		
2017	Vientiane United		
2018	Thip Savan		
2019	Samut Prakan		
2019	Wat bot City		
2020	Master 7 FC		
2021	Muanghat United		
2023-	Bolikhamxay		

International career^{‡}
2012–2018	Laos	28	(0)
- * Club domestic league appearances and goals ‡ National team caps and goals as of 20 November 2018

Thothilath Sibounhuang is a Laotian footballer who plays as a defender. player Bolikhamxay in Lao League 1 He captained the Laos national football team at the 2017 CTFA International Tournament.
