= Cheng Meng =

Cambodian footballer

Cheng Meng ឆេង ម៉េង
Personal information
- Full name: Cheng Meng
- Date of birth: February 27, 1998 (age 28)
- Place of birth: Koh Kong, Cambodia
- Height: 1.75 m (5 ft 9 in)
- Position: Left back

Team information
- Current team: Visakha
- Number: 19

Youth career
- Nagaworld

Senior career*
Years	Team	Apps	(Gls)
2014–2018	Nagaworld		
2019–	Visakha		

International career^{‡}
2015	Cambodia U19	9	(0)
2017–2019	Cambodia U22	8	(0)
2015–2019	Cambodia U23	9	(0)
2019–	Cambodia	31	(0)
Medal record
Men's football
Representing Cambodia
FIFA ASEAN Challenge Cup
Runner-up	2026 Hong Kong
- * Club domestic league appearances and goals ‡ National team caps and goals as of 5 October 2026

Cheng Meng (also spelled Chheng Meng, born 27 February 1998) is a Cambodian professional footballer who plays as a left back for Cambodian Premier League club Visakha and the Cambodia national team. He is of Chinese descent.

== International career ==
Meng represented Cambodia at two Southeast Asian Games in 2017 and 2019. To date, he has made 53 international appearances at all levels, including 27 at senior level.
