= Brak Thiva =

Cambodian footballer

Personal information
- Full name: Brak Thiva
- Date of birth: 5 December 1998 (age 27)
- Place of birth: Koh Kong, Cambodia
- Height: 1.72 m (5 ft 8 in)
- Position: Attacking midfielder

Team information
- Current team: Phnom Penh Crown
- Number: 18

Youth career
- 2013– 2016: Trat

Senior career*
Years	Team	Apps	(Gls)
2017–	Phnom Penh Crown		

International career^{‡}
2017	Cambodia U22	10	(0)
2017	Cambodia U23	9	(0)
2017–	Cambodia	14	(1)
- * Club domestic league appearances and goals ‡ National team caps and goals as of 24 July 2017

Brak Thiva (Khmer: ប្រាក់ ធីវ៉ា [prak tʰiːʋaː]; born 5 December 1998) is a Cambodian professional footballer who plays as an attacking midfielder for Cambodian Premier League club Phnom Penh Crown and the Cambodia national team.

== International ==
As of matches played 3 March 2017.

National team	Year	Apps	Goals
Cambodia	2017	3	0
Total		3	0

International goals

List	Date	Venue	Opponent	Score	Result	Competition
1.	14 June 2022	Salt Lake Stadium, Kolkata, India	Afghanistan	1–2	2–2	2023 AFC Asian Cup qualification

== Honours ==
Phnom Penh Crown

- Cambodian Premier League: 2021, 2022
- Hun Sen Cup: 2024–25
- Cambodian Super Cup: 2022
- Cambodian League Cup: 2022, 2023
