= 2014 Myanmar National League =

Myanmar National League
- Season: 2014
- Champions: Yadanarbon
- Relegated: Southern Myanmar; GFA
- Matches: 132
- Goals: 429 (3.25 per match)
- Top goalscorer: César Augusto (26 goals)
- Biggest home win: Yadanarbon 6–0 Southern Myanmar
- Biggest away win: Chin United 0–8 Yangon United
- Highest scoring: Chin United 1–8 Yangon United

The 2014 Myanmar National League season was 5th edition of Myanmar National League. The first round of the season was on 1 February 2014 and ended on 8 June 2013. The second round begins on 7 June 2014 and ends on 21 November 2014.

== Foreign players ==
The number of foreign players is restricted to four per MNL team, including a slot for a player from AFC countries.

| Club | Visa 1 | Visa 2 | Visa 3 | Asian-Visa |
|---|---|---|---|---|
| Ayeyawady United | (Serbia) Saša Ranković | (Ivory Coast) Lassina Koné | (Nigeria) Clarke Clifford | (South Korea) Kim Sung-Min |
| Chin United | (Liberia) Keith Martu Nah | (Liberia) Hanson Harmon | | (South Korea) Chun Yagin |
| GFA | (Nigeria) Auyasi Omile Obinna | | | (Japan) Yudai |
| Kanbawza | (Ghana) Samuel Hanson | (Croatia) Tihomir Živković | (Brazil) Junior | (Japan) Ken Matsumoto |
| Magway | (Guinea) Mansa Sylla | (Guinea) Sekou Sylla | (Cameroon) Madengue Moussina Emmenuel | (Japan) Yuki Fujimoto |
| Manaw Myay | (Ivory Coast) Molo Hilaire Assalé | (Ivory Coast) Ollo Kambou | (Ivory Coast) Ibrahim Ouattara | |
| Nay Pyi Taw | (Argentina) Carlos Delgado | (Italy) Michele Di Piedi | (Nigeria) Obadin Aikhena | (South Korea) Jung Yoon-sik |
| Southern Myanmar | (Japan) Musashi Okuyama | | | (Japan) Shotaro Ihata |
| Yadanarbon | (Colombia) Edison Fonseca | (Nigeria) Okpechi Happiness | (Ivory Coast) Djedje Maximin | (Japan) Shimpei Sakurada |
| Yangon United | (Brazil) César Augusto | (Brazil) Emerson Luiz | (North Macedonia) Aleksandar Vasilev | (Australia) Matt Acton |
| Zeyar Shwe Myay | (Nigeria) Chukwuazu Chidiebere Basil | (Nigeria) Idoko Sunday Mathew | (Cameroon) Ekoule Martin | |
| Zwegapin United | (Cameroon) Aziz | (Ivory Coast) Jean Patrice Gnonsian Oulou | (North Macedonia) Toni Dzangarovski | (Japan) Takamatsu Kentaro |

== Standings ==
| Pos | Team | Pld | W | D | L | GF | GA | GD | Pts | Qualification or relegation |
|---|---|---|---|---|---|---|---|---|---|---|
| 1 | Yadanarbon | 21 | 15 | 5 | 1 | 40 | 14 | +26 | 50 | Mekong Club Championship and AFC Cup Group stage |
| 2 | Yangon United | 21 | 14 | 4 | 3 | 60 | 22 | +38 | 46 | |
| 3 | Kanbawza | 21 | 11 | 4 | 6 | 35 | 27 | +8 | 37 | |
| 4 | Magway | 21 | 11 | 3 | 7 | 36 | 26 | +10 | 36 | |
| 5 | Ayeyawady United | 21 | 9 | 6 | 6 | 37 | 30 | +7 | 33 | AFC Cup Group stage (Note: Ayeyawady United qualified for the 2015 AFC Cup as they won the 2014 MFF Cup.) |
| 6 | Nay Pyi Taw | 21 | 10 | 2 | 9 | 33 | 31 | +2 | 32 | |
| 7 | Manaw Myay | 21 | 8 | 5 | 8 | 27 | 25 | +2 | 29 | |
| 8 | Zwekapin United | 21 | 6 | 6 | 9 | 34 | 29 | +5 | 24 | |
| 9 | Zeyar Shwe Myay | 21 | 7 | 4 | 10 | 33 | 44 | −11 | 25 | |
| 10 | Chin United | 21 | 6 | 2 | 13 | 39 | 54 | −15 | 20 | |
| 11 | Southern Myanmar | 21 | 3 | 3 | 15 | 16 | 56 | −40 | 12 | Relegation to MNL-2 |
| 12 | GFA | 21 | 2 | 4 | 15 | 13 | 45 | −32 | 10 | Relegation to MNL-2 |

== Personnel and stadiums ==
| Club | Manager | Shirt Sponsor | Stadiums | Capacity |
|---|---|---|---|---|
| Ayeyawady United | (Myanmar) U Sann Win | (Myanmar) Awba | Kyaut Tie Stadium | 3000 |
| Chin United | (Myanmar) U Htay Myint | | Har Kharr Stadium | 4000 |
| GFA | (Myanmar) – | (Myanmar) GFA | Har Kharr Stadium | 4000 |
| Kanbawza | (Myanmar) U Soe Myat Min | (Myanmar) KBZ | KBZ Stadium | 4500 |
| Magway | (Myanmar) U Kyi Lwin | (Myanmar) Green Luck | Magway Stadium | 3000 |
| Manaw Myay | (Brazil) Emerson Alcântara | (Myanmar) – | Swomprabon Stadium | 3000 |
| Nay Pyi Taw | (Myanmar) U Myo Hlaing Win | | Paung Laung Stadium | 15000 |
| Southern Myanmar | (Australia) (England) Ken Worden | (Myanmar) Yuzana | Yamanya Stadium | 2000 |
| Yadanarbon | (Myanmar) U Khin Maung Tint | (Thailand) M-150 | Bahtoo Stadium | 17000 |
| Yangon United | (Australia) Eric Williams | (Myanmar) AGD Bank | Yangon United Sports Complex | 3500 |
| Zeyar Shwe Myay | (Myanmar) U Soe Moe | (Myanmar) Sky Net | Monywa Stadium | 5000 |
| Zwekapin United | (Myanmar) U Aung Min Oo | | Hpa-An Stadium | 3000 |

== Matches ==
Fixtures and results of the Myanmar National League 2014 season.

=== Week 1 ===
| 1 February 2014 | Yangon United | 2–1 | Manaw Myay | Yangon United Sports Complex, Yangon |
| 16:00 UTC+06:30 | Aleksandar Vasilev 73'; Yan Aung Kyaw 82' | | Assalé 90+1' |

| 1 February 2014 | Zeyar Shwe Myay | 2–1 | Southern Myanmar | Monywa Stadium, Monywa |
| 16:00 UTC+06:30 | Chukwuazu Basil 68', 69' | | Soe Myat Thu 62' |

| 1 February 2014 | Kanbawza | 2–1 | Nay Pyi Taw | KBZ Stadium, Taunggyi |
| 15:30 UTC+06:30 | Soe Min Oo 56'; Samuel Hanson 67' | | Michele Di Piedi 17' |

| 1 February 2014 | GFA | 0–6 | Zwekapin United | Bogyoke Aung San Stadium, Yangon |
| 16:00 UTC+06:30 | | | Takamatsu Kentaro 3'; Naing Naing Kyaw 29'; Nyi Nyi Min 39', 45'; Amaobi 14', 42' |

| 1 February 2014 | Yadanarbon | 1–0 | Chin United | Bahtoo Stadium, Mandalay |
| 16:00 UTC+06:30 | Edison Fonseca 76' |

| 2 February 2014 | Magway | 2–1 | Ayeyawady United | Thuwunna Stadium, Yangon |
| 16:00 UTC+06:30 | Chun Boas 73'; Myo Zaw Oo 87' | | Saša Ranković 84' |

=== Week 2 ===
| 8 February 2014 | Kanbawza | 1–1 | Yangon United | KBZ Stadium, Taunggyi |
| 15:30 UTC+06:30 | Tihomir Živković 60' | | Emerson 69' |

| 8 February 2014 | Ayeyawady United | 0–1 | Yadanarbon | Bogyoke Aung San Stadium, Yangon |
| 16:00 UTC+06:30 | | | Edison Fonseca 24' (pen.) |

| 8 February 2014 | Magway | 0–1 | Zeyar Shwe Myay | Thuwunna Stadium, Yangon |
| 16:00 UTC+06:30 | | | Idoko Mathew 90' |

| 9 February 2014 | Manaw Myay | 2–0 | Southern Myanmar | Thuwunna Stadium, Yangon |
| 16:00 UTC+06:30 | Ollo Kambou 24'; Assalé 81' |

| 9 February 2014 | GFA | 0–1 | Chin United | Bogyoke Aung San Stadium, Yangon |
| 16:00 UTC+06:30 | | | Wai Phyo 74' |

| 10 February 2014 | Zwekapin United | 0–2 | Nay Pyi Taw | Bogyoke Aung San Stadium, Yangon |
| 16:00 UTC+06:30 | | | Michele Di Piedi 23'; Aung Kyaw Naing 79' |

=== Week 3 ===
| 15 February 2014 | Nay Pyi Taw | 3–1 | Chin United | Bogyoke Aung San Stadium, Yangon |
| 16:00 UTC+06:30 | Obadin Aikhena 34'; Jung Yoon-sik 72' (pen.); Michele Di Piedi 76' | | Keith Murtu Nah 9' |

| 15 February 2014 | Yangon United | 6–1 | Zeyar Shwe Myay | Yangon United Sports Complex, Yangon |
| 16:00 UTC+06:30 | César Augusto 31' (pen.), 41', 47', 73'; Kyaw Ko Ko 45'; Emerson 56' | | Chukwuazu Basil 75' |

| 15 February 2014 | Zwekapin United | 1–2 | Yadanarbon | Bogyoke Aung San Stadium, Yangon |
| 16:00 UTC+06:30 | Takamatsu Kentaro 11' | | Edison Fonseca 48' (pen.), 72' (pen.) |

| 16 February 2014 | Ayeyawady United | 3–1 | Kanbawza | Bogyoke Aung San Stadium, Yangon |
| 16:00 UTC+06:30 | Lassina Koné 63', 89'; Nanda Lin Kyaw Chit 84' | | Soe Min Oo 71' |

| 16 February 2014 | Manaw Myay | 1–0 | Magway | Thuwunna Stadium, Yangon |
| 16:00 UTC+06:30 | Kyaw Swar Lin I 45+1' |

| 17 February 2014 | Southern Myanmar | 2–0 | GFA | Thuwunna Stadium, Yangon |
| 16:00 UTC+06:30 | Khine Zaw Tun 79'; Obinna 90+1' (o.g.) |

=== Week 4 ===
| 21 February 2014 | Nay Pyi Taw | 2–1 | Manaw Myay | Thuwunna Stadium, Yangon |
| 16:00 UTC+06:30 | Ni Maung Maung Aung 3'; Delgado Alberto 62' (pen.) | | Assalé 13' |

| 21 February 2014 | Ayeyawady United | 2–4 | Yangon United | Bogyoke Aung San Stadium, Yangon |
| 16:00 UTC+06:30 | Nanda Lin Kyaw Chit 37'; Nay Lin Tun 90' | | Emerson 45'; César Augusto 54'; Kyaw Ko Ko 71'; Sithu Aung 85' |

| 22 February 2014 | Zeyar Shwe Myay | 2–1 | GFA | Monywa Stadium, Monywa |
| 16:00 UTC+06:30 | Hla Tun Aung 11'; Thet Paing Oo 56' | | Naing Kyaw Thet 34' |

| 22 February 2014 | Magway | 3–2 | Chin United | Thuwunna Stadium, Yangon |
| 16:00 UTC+06:30 | Soe Min Naing 20'; Sekou Sylla 48', 67' | | Keith Murtu Nah 65'; Chit Su Moe 73' |

| 23 February 2014 | Southern Myanmar | 1–1 | Zwekapin United | Thuwunna Stadium, Yangon |
| 16:00 UTC+06:30 | Htet Aung 22' | | Takamatsu Kentaro 4' |

| 23 February 2014 | Kanbawza | 1–1 | Yadanarbon | KBZ Stadium, Taunggyi |
| 15:30 UTC+06:30 | Tihomir Živković 30' | | Edison Fonseca 1' |

=== Week 5 ===
| 1 March 2014 | Magway | 3–1 | Kanbawza | Thuwunna Stadium, Yangon |
| 16:00 UTC+06:30 | Madengue 10', 58'; Sekou Sylla 83' | | Tihomir Živković 5' |

| 2 March 2014 | Zeyar Shwe Myay | 2–1 | Manaw Myay | Monywa Stadium, Monywa |
| 16:00 UTC+06:30 | Zaw Lin Tun 30'; Chukwuazu Basil 59' | | Ibrahim Ouattara 68' |

| 2 March 2014 | Chin United | 0–4 | Zwekapin United | Thuwunna Stadium, Yangon |
| 16:00 UTC+06:30 | | | Amaobi 8'; Gnosian 27' (pen.); Takamatsu Kentaro 55'; Nyi Nyi Min 63' |

| 2 March 2014 | Yadanarbon | 1–0 | Yangon United | Bahtoo Stadium, Mandalay |
| 16:00 UTC+06:30 | Edison Fonseca 75' |

| 3 March 2014 | Nay Pyi Taw | 2–0 | GFA | Bogyoke Aung San Stadium, Yangon |
| 16:00 UTC+06:30 | Aung Kyaw Naing 55', 61' |

| 3 March 2014 | Southern Myanmar | 1–1 | Ayeyawady United | Thuwunna Stadium, Yangon |
| 16:00 UTC+06:30 | Yan Naing Htwe 82' | | Saša Ranković 59' |

=== Week 6 ===
| 7 March 2014 | Yangon United | 0–0 | GFA | Yangon United Sports Complex, Yangon |
| 16:00 UTC+06:30 |

| 8 March 2014 | Ayeyawady United | 0–1 | Nay Pyi Taw | Bogyoke Aung San Stadium, Yangon |
| 16:00 UTC+06:30 | | | Michele Di Piedi 7' |

| 8 March 2014 | Yadanarbon | 1–0 | Magway | Bahtoo Stadium, Mandalay |
| 16:00 UTC+06:30 | Edison Fonseca 90+5' |

| 8 March 2014 | Southern Myanmar | 0–4 | Chin United | Thuwunna Stadium, Yangon |
| 16:00 UTC+06:30 | | | Chun Yagin 14', 32'; Keith Murtu Nah 59', 73' |

| 9 March 2014 | Zwekapin United | 2–2 | Zeyar Shwe Myay | Bogyoke Aung San Stadium, Yangon |
| 16:00 UTC+06:30 | Naing Naing Kyaw 10'; Amaobi 82' | | Chukwuazu 18'; Ekoule Martin 43' |

| 9 March 2014 | Manaw Myay | 0–1 | Kanbawza | Thuwunna Stadium, Yangon |
| 16:00 UTC+06:30 | | | Ken Matsumoto 87' |

=== Week 7 ===
| 15 March 2014 | Kanbawza | 1–1 | Zwekapin United | KBZ Stadium, Taunggyi |
| 15:30 UTC+06:30 | Soe Min Oo 90+2' | | Thein Zaw 26' |

| 15 March 2014 | Yadanarbon | 6–0 | Southern Myanmar | Bahtoo Stadium, Mandalay |
| 16:00 UTC+06:30 | Edison Fonseca 12', 46', 50'; Dway Ko Ko Chit 14'; Zin Min Tun 23'; Thet Naing 81' |

| 15 March 2014 | Nay Pyi Taw | 2–0 | Zeyar Shwe Myay | Paung Laung Stadium, Naypyidaw |
| 16:00 UTC+06:30 | Yan Kyaw Htwe 12'; Michele Di Piedi 90+2' |

| 15 March 2014 | Magway | 4–1 | Yangon United | Thuwunna Stadium, Yangon |
| 16:00 UTC+06:30 | Madengue 13'; Sekou Sylla 58'; Soe Min Naing 75'; Maung Maung Soe 87' | | Nay Min Tun 60' (o.g.) |

| 16 March 2014 | Ayeyawady United | 2–2 | Chin United | Bogyoke Aung San Stadium, Yangon |
| 16:00 UTC+06:30 | Saša Ranković 25'; Nanda Lin Kyaw Chit 48' | | Keith Murtu Nah 13', 39' |

| 16 March 2014 | Manaw Myay | 3–0 | GFA | Thuwunna Stadium, Yangon |
| 16:00 UTC+06:30 | Ibrahim Ouattara 8'; Molo Assalé 72'; Nyein Chan Aung 81' |

=== Week 8 ===
| 22 March 2014 | Zeyar Shwe Myay | 0–1 | Kanbawza | Monywa Stadium, Monywa |
| 16:00 UTC+06:30 | | | Soe Min Oo 84' |

| 22 March 2014 | Zwekapin United | 1–4 | Ayeyawady United | Bogyoke Aung San Stadium, Yangon |
| 16:00 UTC+06:30 | Thein Zaw 74' | | Clarke Clifford 8'; Saša Ranković 55'; Min Min Thu 86'; Nay Lin Tun 90+4' |

| 23 March 2014 | Yangon United | 5–0 | Southern Myanmar | Yangon United Sports Complex, Yangon |
| 16:00 UTC+06:30 | Kyaw Ko Ko 26', 40'; Emerson Luiz 35', 88'; Pyae Phyo Aung 51' |

| 23 March 2014 | Nay Pyi Taw | 0–0 | Yadanarbon | Paung Laung Stadium, Naypyidaw |
| 16:00 UTC+06:30 |

| 23 March 2014 | GFA | 0–1 | Magway | Bogyoke Aung San Stadium, Yangon |
| 16:00 UTC+06:30 | | | Sekou Sylla 58' |

| 23 March 2014 | Chin United | 1–2 | Manaw Myay | Thuwunna Stadium, Yangon |
| 16:00 UTC+06:30 | Keith Murtu Nah 39' | | Molo Assalé 21'; Ollo Kambou 26' (pen.) |

=== Week 9 ===
| 28 March 2014 | Southern Myanmar | 1–3 | Nay Pyi Taw | Thuwunna Stadium, Yangon |
| 16:00 UTC+06:30 | Zin Myo Win 57' | | Nyein Tayzar Win 3', 50'; Aung Kyaw Naing 6' |

| 29 March 2014 | GFA | 1–2 | Kanbawza | Bogyoke Aung San Stadium, Yangon |
| 16:00 UTC+06:30 | Tial Kulh Sum 79' | | Tihomir Živković 13'; Soe Min Oo 83' |

| 29 March 2014 | Manaw Myay | 1–1 | Yadanarbon | Thuwunna Stadium, Yangon |
| 16:00 UTC+06:30 | Naing Oo Lwin 72' | | Edison Fonseca 82' |

| 29 March 2014 | Zeyar Shwe Myay | 1–2 | Ayeyawady United | Monywa Stadium, Monywa |
| 16:00 UTC+06:30 | Idoko Mathew 55' | | Kim Sung-Min 38'; Zaw Lin Tun 87' (o.g.) |

| 29 March 2014 | Yangon United | 2–1 | Chin United | Yangon United Sports Complex, Yangon |
| 16:00 UTC+06:30 | David Htan 38'; Emerson Luiz 60' | | Be Be 88' |

| 30 March 2014 | Zwekapin United | 0–1 | Magway | Bogyoke Aung San Stadium, Yangon |
| 16:00 UTC+06:30 | | | Aung Show Thar Maung 90+3' |

=== Week 10 ===
| 2 June 2014 | Magway | 1–0 | Nay Pyi Taw | Thuwunna Stadium, Yangon |
| 16:00 UTC+06:30 | Myo Zaw Oo 68' |

| 5 April 2014 | Yadanarbon | 5–0 | GFA | Bahtoo Stadium, Mandalay |
| 16:00 UTC+06:30 | Edison Fonseca 7', 49', 85'; Yan Aung Win 14', 60' |

| 5 April 2014 | Zeyar Shwe Myay | 2–3 | Chin United | Monywa Stadium, Monywa |
| 16:00 UTC+06:30 | Zaw Lin Tun 48', 58' | | Keith Murtu Nah 6', 75'; Chun Yagin 50' |

| 6 April 2014 | Ayeyawady United | 0–0 | Manaw Myay | Bogyoke Aung San Stadium, Yangon |
| 16:00 UTC+06:30 |

| 6 April 2014 | Southern Myanmar | 1–4 | Kanbawza | Thuwunna Stadium, Yangon |
| 16:00 UTC+06:30 | Soe Kyaw Thu 66' | | Tihomir Živković 2', 28'; Thein Than Win 30'; Junior 69' |

| 2 June 2014 | Yangon United | 1–1 | Zwekapin United | Yangon United Sports Complex, Yangon |
| 16:00 UTC+06:30 | César Augusto 2' | | Toni Dzangarovski 80' |

=== Week 11 ===
| 7 June 2014 | Yangon United | 4–0 | Nay Pyi Taw | Yangon United Sports Complex, Yangon |
| 16:00 UTC+06:30 | César Augusto 37' (pen.), 65', 81'; Emerson 2' |

| 7 June 2014 | Yadanarbon | 2–0 | Zeyar Shwe Myay | Bahtoo Stadium, Mandalay |
| 16:00 UTC+06:30 | Edison Fonseca 2'; Dway Ko Ko Chit 70' |

| 7 June 2014 | GFA | 2–2 | Ayeyawady United | Bogyoke Aung San Stadium, Yangon |
| 16:00 UTC+06:30 | Naing Naing Lin 24'; Yudai 73' | | Saša Ranković 35', 55' |

| 7 June 2014 | Southern Myanmar | 1–2 | Magway | Thuwunna Stadium, Yangon |
| 16:00 UTC+06:30 | Musashi Okuyama 88' | | Soe Min Naing 21'; Madengue 53' |

| 8 June 2014 | Zwekapin United | 0–1 | Manaw Myay | Bogyoke Aung San Stadium, Yangon |
| 16:00 UTC+06:30 | | | Thein Zaw 65' |

| 8 June 2014 | Chin United | 1–3 | Kanbawza | Thuwunna Stadium, Yangon |
| 16:00 UTC+06:30 | Keith Murtu Nah 36' | | Soe Min Oo 1'; Min Min Tun 42'; Mai Aih Naing 90+2' |

=== Week 12 ===
| 14 June 2014 | Manaw Myay | 2–1 | Nay Pyi Taw | Thuwunna Stadium, Yangon |
| 16:00 UTC+06:30 | Molo Assalé 25'; Ibrahim 86' | | Michele Di Piedi |

| 14 June 2014 | Yangon United | 2–3 | Ayeyawady United | Yangon United Sports Complex, Yangon |
| 15:30 UTC+06:30 | César Augusto 21', 59' | | Naing Lin Oo 40'; Min Min Thu 80'; Nanda Lin Kyaw Chit 90+3' |

| 14 June 2014 | GFA | 2–2 | Zeyar Shwe Myay | Bogyoke Aung San Stadium, Yangon |
| 16:00 UTC+06:30 | Yudai 42'; Aung Kyaw Htay 71' | | Chukwuazu Basil 45', 78' (pen.) |

| 15 June 2014 | Chin United | 3–2 | Magway | Thuwunna Stadium, Yangon |
| 16:00 UTC+06:30 | Nyi Nyi Min 37'; Keith Murtu Nah 39', 54' (pen.) | | Myo Zaw Oo 47'; Ko Ko Naing 61' (pen.) |

| 15 June 2014 | Zwekapin United | 0–0 | Southern Myanmar | Bogyoke Aung San Stadium, Yangon |
| 16:00 UTC+06:30 |

| 15 June 2014 | Yadanarbon | 0–1 | Kanbawza | Bahtoo Stadium, Mandalay |
| 16:00 UTC+06:30 | | | Ken Matsumoto 58' |

=== Week 13 ===
| 21 June 2014 | Manaw Myay | 0–2 | Yangon United | Thuwunna Stadium, Yangon |
| 16:00 UTC+06:30 | | | César Augusto 34', 82' (pen.) |

| 21 June 2014 | Nay Pyi Taw | 2–1 | Kanbawza | Paung Laung Stadium, Naypyidaw |
| 16:00 UTC+06:30 | Aung Kyaw Naing 40'; Michele Di Piedi 46' | | Kyaw Zayar Win 60' |

| 21 June 2014 | Zwekapin United | 4–1 | GFA | Bogyoke Aung San Stadium, Yangon |
| 16:00 UTC+06:30 | Takamatsu Kentaro 5' (pen.); Aziz 32', 45', 46' | | Auyasi Obinna 84' |

| 22 June 2014 | Southern Myanmar | 0–1 | Zeyar Shwe Myay | Thuwunna Stadium, Yangon |
| 16:00 UTC+06:30 | | | ?? ??' |

| 22 June 2014 | Ayeyawady United | 3–2 | Magway | Bogyoke Aung San Stadium, Yangon |
| 16:00 UTC+06:30 | Kim Sung-Min 61'; Saša Ranković 67', 79' | | Madengue Emmenuel 7' (pen.); Sekou Sylla 36' |

| 23 June 2014 | Chin United | 2–3 | Yadanarbon | Thuwunna Stadium, Yangon |
| 16:00 UTC+06:30 | Keith Murtu Nah 69' (pen.), 85' | | Edison Fonseca 16'; Ye Win Aung 21'; Aung Myint Aye 44' |

=== Week 14 ===
| 12 July 2014 | GFA | 0–2 | Yangon United | Bogyoke Aung San Stadium, Yangon |
| 16:00 UTC+06:30 | | | Khin Maung Lwin 10'; César Augusto 79' |

| 12 July 2014 | Nay Pyi Taw | 1–2 | Ayeyawady United | Paung Laung Stadium, Naypyidaw |
| 16:00 UTC+06:30 | Jung Yoon-sik 68' | | Nanda Lin Kyaw Chit 24'; Saša Ranković 61' |

| 12 July 2014 | Magway | 2–2 | Yadanarbon | Thuwunna Stadium, Yangon |
| 16:00 UTC+06:30 | Sekou Sylla 29'; Madengue Emmenuel 72' | | Aung Myint Aye 13'; Edison Fonseca 49' |

| 14 July 2014 | Zeyar Shwe Myay | 0–2 | Zwekapin United | Monywa Stadium, Monywa |
| 15:30 UTC+06:30 | | | Aziz 8'; Naing Naing Kyaw 83' |

| 13 July 2014 | Kanbawza | 1–0 | Manaw Myay | Bogyoke Aung San Stadium, Yangon |
| 15:30 UTC+06:30 | Kyaw Zayar Win 55' |

| 13 July 2014 | Chin United | 4–2 | Southern Myanmar | Thuwunna Stadium, Yangon |
| 16:00 UTC+06:30 | Hanson Harmon 57'; Keith Murtu Nah 58'; Ram Hlei Ceu 73'; Nyi Nyi Min 90+2' | | Sa Sa 37'; Yan Naing Htwe 85' |

=== Week 15 ===
| 25 July 2014 | Ayeyawady United | 4–1 | Southern Myanmar | Bogyoke Aung San Stadium, Yangon |
| 16:00 UTC+06:30 | Nanda Lin Kyaw Chit 17', 26', 46'; Saša Ranković 56' | | Shotaro Ihata 53' |

| 26 July 2014 | Kanbawza | 1–1 | Magway | Bogyoke Aung San Stadium, Yangon |
| 15:30 UTC+06:30 | Kyaw Zayar Win 35' | | Ko Ko Naing 50' |

| 26 July 2014 | Manaw Myay | 4–4 | Zeyar Shwe Myay | Thuwunna Stadium, Yangon |
| 16:00 UTC+06:30 | Molo Assalé 45' (pen.), 90'; Ibrahim Ouattara 51'; Ollo Kambou 82' | | Idoko Mathew 28'; Chukwuazu Basil 8' (pen.), 90+3'; Ekoule Martin 60' |

| 26 July 2014 | Zwekapin United | 2–1 | Chin United | Bogyoke Aung San Stadium, Yangon |
| 16:00 UTC+06:30 | Naing Naing Kyaw 64'; Tin Win Aung 77' | | Keith Murtu Nah 88' |

| 27 July 2014 | Yangon United | 2–2 | Yadanarbon | Yangon United Sports Complex, Yangon |
| 15:30 UTC+06:30 | Emerson Luiz 4'; Yan Aung Kyaw 42' | | Yan Aung Win 28'; Djedje Maximin 55' |

| 27 July 2014 | GFA | 1–3 | Nay Pyi Taw | Bogyoke Aung San Stadium, Yangon |
| 16:00 UTC+06:30 | Jordan 52' | | Pyae Phyo Oo 5', 36'; Michele Di Piedi 90+3' |

=== Week 16 ===
| 2 August 2014 | Nay Pyi Taw | 1–2 | Southern Myanmar | Paung Laung Stadium, Naypyidaw |
| 16:00 UTC+06:30 | Pyae Phyo Oo 59' | | Shotaro Ihata 43'; Ye Aung 76' |

| 2 August 2014 | Kanbawza | 2–0 | GFA | Bogyoke Aung San Stadium, Yangon |
| 15:30 UTC+06:30 | Kyaw Zayar Win 18'; Soe Min Oo 65' |

| 2 August 2014 | Chin United | 1–8 | Yangon United | Thuwunna Stadium, Yangon |
| 16:00 UTC+06:30 | Keith Murtu Nah 43' | | César Augusto 16', 37', 49', 52'; Emerson Luiz 39', 65'; Ram Din Sanga 43' (o.g.); Kyaw Ko Ko 90+1' |

| 3 August 2014 | Yadanarbon | 3–2 | Manaw Myay | Bahtoo Stadium, Mandalay |
| 16:00 UTC+06:30 | Edison Fonseca 23' (pen.); Thet Naing 29', 33' | | Ollo Kambou 4'; Naing Oo Lwin 43' |

| 3 August 2014 | Magway | 2–0 | Zwekapin United | Thuwunna Stadium, Yangon |
| 16:00 UTC+06:30 | Madengue Emmenuel 29', 41' |

| 3 August 2014 | Ayeyawady United | 0–1 | Zeyar Shwe Myay | Bogyoke Aung San Stadium, Yangon |
| 16:00 UTC+06:30 | | | Chukwuazu Basil 81' |

=== Week 17 ===
| 10 August 2014 | Magway | 0–1 | Manaw Myay | Thuwunna Stadium, Yangon |
| 16:00 UTC+06:30 | | | Ollo Kambou 90+2' |

| 10 August 2014 | GFA | 1–0 | Southern Myanmar | Yangon United Sports Complex, Yangon |
| 15:30 UTC+06:30 | Tial Kulh Sam 43' |

| 11 August 2014 | Chin United | 4–4 | Nay Pyi Taw | Thuwunna Stadium, Yangon |
| 16:00 UTC+06:30 | Suan Lam Mang 22'; Hanson Harmon 23', 82'; Keith Murtu Nah 67' | | Carlos Delgado 34'; Aung Kyaw Naing 47', 59'; Pyae Phyo Oo 62' |

| 11 August 2014 | Kanbawza | 2–3 | Ayeyawady United | Yangon United Sports Complex, Yangon |
| 15:30 UTC+06:30 | Soe Min Oo 67' (pen.); Min Min Tun 90+4' | | Lassina Koné 37'; Saša Ranković 58'; Nanda Lin Kyaw Chit 82' |

| 11 August 2014 | Yadanarbon | 1–0 | Zwekapin United | Bahtoo Stadium, Mandalay |
| 16:00 UTC+06:30 | Edison Fonseca 62' |

| 12 August 2014 | Zeyar Shwe Myay | 1–3 | Yangon United | Thuwunna Stadium, Yangon |
| 16:00 UTC+06:30 | Idoko Mathew 14' | | Emerson Luiz 56'; César Augusto 75'; Kyaw Ko Ko 90' |

=== Week 18 ===
| 23 August 2014 | Nay Pyi Taw | 3–2 | Magway | Paung Laung Stadium, Naypyidaw |
| 16:00 UTC+06:30 | Michele Di Piedi 12'; Pyae Phyo Oo 15'; Ni Maung Maung Aung 36' | | Yuki Fujimoto 28'; Htoo Htoo Aung 82' |

| 23 August 2014 | GFA | 0–2 | Yadanarbon | Bogyoke Aung San Stadium, Yangon |
| 16:00 UTC+06:30 | | | Zin Min Tun 56'; Thet Naing 81' |

| 23 August 2014 | Chin United | 2–4 | Zeyar Shwe Myay | Thuwunna Stadium, Yangon |
| 16:00 UTC+06:30 | Keith Murtu Nah 53', 87' | | Ekoule Martin 24'; Aung Myo Lwin 51'; Chukwuazu Basil 66'; Idoko Mathew 76' |

| 24 August 2014 | Kanbawza | 2–0 | Southern Myanmar | Bogyoke Aung San Stadium, Yangon |
| 16:00 UTC+06:30 | Tihomir Živković 37', 68' |

| 24 August 2014 | Manaw Myay | 1–1 | Ayeyawady United | Thuwunna Stadium, Yangon |
| 16:00 UTC+06:30 | Tun Min Soe 37' | | Lassina Koné 70' (pen.) |

| 24 August 2014 | Zwekapin United | 2–4 | Yangon United | Bogyoke Aung San Stadium, Yangon |
| 16:00 UTC+06:30 | Aziz 48'; Takamatsu Kentaro 87' (pen.) | | Kyaw Ko Ko 15', 27'; Emerson Luiz 31', 78' |

=== Week 19 ===
| 24 August 2014 | Kanbawza | 2–3 | Chin United | Bogyoke Aung San Stadium, Yangon |
| 15:30 UTC+06:30 | Nay Win Aung 20'; Soe Min Oo 75' (pen.) | | Keith Murtu Nah 18', 67'; Chit Su Moe 90+1' |

| 23 August 2014 | Magway | 4–1 | Southern Myanmar | Thuwunna Stadium, Yangon |
| 16:00 UTC+06:30 | Yuki Fujimoto 29'; Soe Min Naing 41', 61', 72' | | Shotaro Ihata 9' |

| 23 August 2014 | Ayeyawady United | 1–1 | GFA | Thuwunna Stadium, Yangon |
| 16:00 UTC+06:30 | Naing Lin Oo 34' | | Aung Kyaw Htay 11' |

| 24 August 2014 | Nay Pyi Taw | 0–1 | Yangon United | Paung Laung Stadium, Naypyidaw |
| 16:00 UTC+06:30 | | | César Augusto 87' |

| 25 August 2014 | Zeyar Shwe Myay | 1–3 | Yadanarbon | Monywa Stadium, Monywa |
| 15:30 UTC+06:30 | Ekoule Martin 42' | | Edison Fonseca 4'; Djedje Maximin 11'; Zin Min Tun 38' |

| 28 August 2014 | Manaw Myay | 1–1 | Zwekapin United | Thuwunna Stadium, Yangon |
| 16:00 UTC+06:30 | Kyaw Swar Lin 54' | | Toni Dzangarovski 47' |

=== Week 20 ===
| 13 September 2014 | Kanbawza | 4–3 | Zeyar Shwe Myay | Bogyoke Aung San Stadium, Yangon |
| 15:30 UTC+06:30 | Tihomir Živković 5', 62'; Min Min Tun 16'; Ken Matsumoto 24' | | Chukwuazu Basil 17', 74' (pen.); Zaw Lin Tun 90+11' |

| 12 September 2014 | Ayeyawady United | 3–2 | Zwekapin United | Bogyoke Aung San Stadium, Yangon |
| 16:00 UTC+06:30 | Kim Sung-Min 9'; Min Min Thu 54'; Nay Lin Tun 68' | | Zaw Moe Aung 60', 77' |

| 14 September 2014 | Southern Myanmar | 0–8 | Yangon United | Thuwunna Stadium, Yangon |
| 16:00 UTC+06:30 | | | Yan Aung Kyaw 23'; César Augusto 37', 44', 84', 88'; Emerson Luiz 56'; Kyaw Ko Ko 68'; Yaza Win Thein 77' |

| 20 August 2014 | Yadanarbon | 1–0 | Ayeyawady United | Bahtoo Stadium, Mandalay |
| 16:00 UTC+06:30 | Shimpei Sakurada 13' |

| 13 September 2014 | Manaw Myay | 2–1 | Chin United | Thuwunna Stadium, Yangon |
| 16:00 UTC+06:30 | Thein Zaw 58'; Tin Win Myint 60' | | Keith Murtu Nah 74' |

| 14 September 2014 | Magway | 1–0 | GFA | Thuwunna Stadium, Yangon |
| 16:00 UTC+06:30 | Mansa Sylla 43' |

=== Week 21 ===
| 14 September 2014 | Yadanarbon | 2–1 | Nay Pyi Taw | Bahtoo Stadium, Mandalay |
| 16:00 UTC+06:30 | Yan Paing 5'; Edison Fonseca 73' | | Nay Zaw Aung 81' |

| 19 September 2014 | Southern Myanmar | 2–1 | Manaw Myay | Thuwunna Stadium, Yangon |
| 16:00 UTC+06:30 |

| 20 September 2014 | Yangon United | 2–1 | Kanbawza | Yangon United Sports Complex, Yangon |
| 15:30 UTC+06:30 |

| 20 September 2014 | Zeyar Shwe Myay | 3–3 | Magway | Monywa Stadium, Monywa |
| 15:30 UTC+06:30 |

| 28 August 2014 | Nay Pyi Taw | 1–4 | Zwekapin United | Paung Laung Stadium, Naypyidaw |
| 16:00 UTC+06:30 | ?? ??' | | ?? ??' ?? ??' ?? ??' ?? ??' |

| 20 September 2014 | Chin United | 2–3 | GFA | Thuwunna Stadium, Yangon |
| 16:00 UTC+06:30 |

=== Week 22 ===
| 27 September 2014 | Zwekapin United | v | Kanbawza | Bogyoke Aung San Stadium, Yangon |
| 16:00 UTC+06:30 |

| 28 September 2014 | Southern Myanmar | v | Yadanarbon | Thuwunna Stadium, Yangon |
| 16:00 UTC+06:30 |

| 27 September 2014 | Zeyar Shwe Myay | v | Nay Pyi Taw | Monywa Stadium, Monywa |
| 15:30 UTC+06:30 |

| 28 September 2014 | Yangon United | v | Magway | Yangon United Sports Complex, Yangon |
| 15:30 UTC+06:30 |

| 27 September 2014 | Chin United | v | Ayeyawady United | Thuwunna Stadium, Yangon |
| 16:00 UTC+06:30 |

| 28 September 2014 | GFA | v | Manaw Myay | Bogyoke Aung San Stadium, Yangon |
| 16:00 UTC+06:30 |

== Season statistics ==
=== Top scorers ===
| No | Player | Club | Goals |
|---|---|---|---|
| 1 | (Brazil) César Augusto | Yangon United | 26 |
| 2 | (Liberia) Keith Martu Nah | Chin United | 25 |
| 3 | (Colombia) Edison Fonseca | Yadanarbon | 21 |
| 4 | (Brazil) Emerson | Yangon United | 14 |
| 5 | (Nigeria) Chukwuazu Basil | Zeyar Shwe Myay | 13 |
| 6 | (Serbia) Saša Ranković | Ayeyawady United | 11 |
| 7 | (Croatia) Tihomir Zikovic | Kanbawza | 10 |
| 8 | (Myanmar) Nanda Lin Kyaw Chit | Ayeyawady United | 9 |
| 8 | (Italy) Michele Di Piedi | Nay Pyi Taw | 9 |
| 8 | (Myanmar) Soe Min Oo | Kanbawza | 9 |
| 8 | (Myanmar) Kyaw Ko Ko | Yangon United | 9 |

=== Hat-tricks ===
| Player | For | Against | Result | Date |
|---|---|---|---|---|
| (Brazil) César Augusto^{4} | Yangon United | Zeyar Shwe Myay | 6–1 | 15 February 2014 |
| (Colombia) Edison Fonseca | Yadanarbon | Southern Myanmar | 6–0 | 15 March 2014 |
| (Colombia) Edison Fonseca | Yadanarbon | GFA | 5–0 | 5 April 2014 |
| (Brazil) César Augusto | Yangon United | Nay Pyi Taw | 4–0 | 7 June 2014 |
| (Cameroon) Aziz | Zwekapin United | GFA | 4–1 | 21 June 2014 |
| (Myanmar) Nanda Lin Kyaw Chit | Ayeyawady United | Southern Myanmar | 4–1 | 25 July 2014 |
| (Brazil) César Augusto^{4} | Yangon United | Chin United | 8–1 | 2 August 2014 |
| (Myanmar) Soe Min Naing | Magway | Southern Myanmar | 4–1 | 23 August 2014 |
| (Brazil) César Augusto^{4} | Yangon United | Southern Myanmar | 8–0 | 14 September 2014 |

- ^{4} Player scored 4 goals

== Awards ==
=== Monthly awards ===
| Month | Manager of the Month | | Player of the Month | |
| Month | Manager | Club | Player | Club |
|---|---|---|---|---|
| February | (Australia) Eric Williams | Yangon United | (Brazil) Emerson | Yangon United |
| March | (Myanmar) Myo Hlaing Win | Nay Pyi Taw FC | (Myanmar) Latt Ko Ko Aye | Nay Pyi Taw FC |
| June & July | (Australia) Eric Williams | Yangon United | (Myanmar) Kyaw Ko Ko | Yangon United |
| August | (Myanmar) Khin Maung Tint | Yadanarbon FC | (Ivory Coast) Djedje Maximin | Yadanarbon FC |
| September | (Australia) Eric Williams | Yangon United | (Myanmar) Yan Aung Kyaw | Yangon United |
