= 2015 Myanmar National League =

Myanmar National League
- Season: 2015
- Champions: Yangon United; 4th Myanmar National League title
- Runner up: Yadabarbon FC
- Relegated: Manaw Myay; Nay Pyi Taw
- Champions League: Yangon United
- AFC Cup: Ayeyawady United
- Matches: 132
- Goals: 405 (3.07 per match)
- Top goalscorer: (Brazil) César Augusto (28 goals)
- Biggest home win: Yangon United 6–0 Rakhine United (11 January 2015)
- Biggest away win: Zwekapin United 0–3 Chin United (19 September 2015)
- Highest scoring: Magway 6–2 Zeyar Shwe Myay (28 February 2015); Yangon United 6–2 Chin United (30 October 2015)
- Longest winning run: Yangon United (12 matches)
- Longest unbeaten run: Yangon United (16 matches)
- Longest winless run: Hanthawaddy United (13 matches)

The 2015 Myanmar National League (known as the Ooredoo Myanmar National League for sponsorship reasons) is the 6th season of the Myanmar National League, the top Burmese professional league for association football clubs. The first round of the season began on 10 January 2015, with the last round ending on 31 October 2015. The Myanmar National League will be temporarily suspended for three months from 8 March to 22 June due to the 2015 Southeast Asian Games held in Singapore. The 2015 transfer window for Myanmar National League clubs will open from 19 May 2015 to 18 June 2015.

Yadarnarbon came in as the champions of the 2014 Myanmar National League. Hanthawaddy United and Rakhine United entered as the two promoted teams from the 2014 Myanmar National League 2.

== Events ==
This season will be the first Myanmar National League season to have Ooredoo as the title sponsor, after penning a deal worth US $1.5 million per year on 20 March 2015.

== Teams ==
A total of 12 teams will compete in the league: 10 sides from the 2014 season and two promoted teams from the 2014 Myanmar National League 2. The two promoted clubs replace Southern Myanmar United and Gospel For Asia.

=== Stadium ===
Club	Region/State	Stadium	Capacity
Ayeyawady United	Ayeyawady Region	Ayar Stadium	6,000
Chin United	Chin State	Har Kharr Stadium	4,000
Hanthawaddy United	Bago Region	Bago Stadium	4,000
Kanbawza	Shan State	KBZ Stadium	4,500
Magwe	Magway Region	Magway Stadium	3,000
Manaw Myay	Kachin State	Swomprabon Stadium	3,000
Nay Pyi Taw	Naypyidaw Union Territory	Paung Laung Stadium	15,000
Rakhine United	Rakhine State	Wai Thar Li Stadium	5,000
Yadanarbon	Mandalay Region	Bahtoo Stadium	17,000
Yangon United	Yangon Region	Yangon United Sports Complex	3,500
Zeyar Shwe Myay	Sagaing Region	Monywa Stadium	5,000
Zwegapin United	Kayin State	Hpa-An Stadium	3,000

=== Personnel and sponsoring ===
Note: Flags indicate national team as has been defined under FIFA eligibility rules. Players may hold more than one non-FIFA nationality.

Team	Head coach	Captain	Kit manufacturer	Shirt sponsor
Ayeyawady United	(North Macedonia) Marjan Sekulovski	(Myanmar) Min Min Thu	(Thailand) FBT	none
Chin United	(Myanmar) U Van Kung	(Nigeria) Clarke Clifford	Made by club	none
Hanthawaddy United	(Myanmar) U Ngwe Tun	(Myanmar) Aung Zaw	(Thailand) EGO	none
Kanbawza	(Myanmar) Soe Myat Min	(Myanmar) Kyaw Zayar Win	(Thailand) FBT	(Myanmar) Air KBZ
Magway	(Myanmar) U Kyi Lwin	(Myanmar) Soe Min Naing	(Thailand) Grand Sport	none
Manaw Myay	(Brazil) Emerson Alcântara	(Myanmar) Thein Zaw	Made by club	none
Nay Pyi Taw	(Myanmar) Myo Hlaing Win	(Myanmar) Chan Chan	(Thailand) EGO	none
Rakhine United	(Myanmar) U Win Tin	(Myanmar) Aung Soe Moe	(Thailand) KOOL	(Myanmar) Up Energy Drink
Yadanarbon	(Belgium) René Desaeyere	(Myanmar) Ye Ko Oo	(Thailand) FBT	(Myanmar) Alpine
Yangon United	(Myanmar) U Tin Maung Tun	(Myanmar) Khin Maung Lwin	(Thailand) Grand Sport	(Myanmar) First National Insurance
Zeyae Shwe Myay	(Sweden) Stefan Hansson	(North Macedonia) Aleksandar Vasilev	(Thailand) Grand Sport	(Myanmar) Sky Net
Zwegapin	(England) Kevin Reeves	(Brazil) Junior	Made by club	(Myanmar) Htay

=== Foreign players ===
The number of foreign players is restricted to four per club, including a slot for a player from AFC countries.

Club	Visa 1	Visa 2	Visa 3	Asian-Visa
Ayeyawady United	(Nigeria) Anderson Ebimo West	(North Macedonia) Riste Naumov	(Bosnia and Herzegovina) Vidic Lazar	(South Korea) Sim Woon-sub
Chin United	(Nigeria) Idoko Sunday Mathew	(Ivory Coast) Jean Patrice Gnonsian Oulou	(Nigeria) Clarke Clifford	(South Korea) Chun Yagin
Hanthawaddy United	(Cameroon) Ousmanou	(Ivory Coast) Bamba	(Liberia) George	
Kanbawza	(Republic of Ireland) Caleb Folan	(Nigeria) Obadin Aikhena	(Georgia (country)) Giorgi Tsimakuridze	(Maldives) Mohamed Arif
Magway	(Guinea) Sylla Sekou	(Cameroon) Di Jam	(Nigeria) Micheal Henry Alloysius	
Manaw Myay	(Nigeria) Ibrahim	(Ivory Coast) Dang Amaobi	(Ivory Coast) Kanbou	
Nay Pyi Taw	(Ghana) Daniel Akuffo	(Ivory Coast) Keita Boubacar	(Nigeria) Happiness	(Japan) Takamatsu
Rakhine United	(Ghana) Bernard Achaw		(Brazil) Marcio Santos	(Japan) Jun Kochi
Yadanarbon	(Cameroon) Kekere Moukailou	(Liberia) Keith Martu Nah	(Ivory Coast) Djedje Maximin	(South Korea) Yeon Gi-sung
Yangon United	(Brazil) Cézar	(Brazil) Emerson	(Brazil) Luiz Fernando	(Japan) Seiji Kaneko
Zeyar Shwe Myay	(North Macedonia) Aleksandar Vasilev	(Costa Rica) Victor Coto	(Ghana) Yakubu Abubakar	(Indonesia) Dedi Gusmawan
Zwekapin United	(Croatia) Tihomir Zivkovic	(Brazil) Junior	(Ghana) Samuel Hanson	(Japan) Ken Matsumoto

== Result ==
=== League table ===
Pos	Team	Pld	W	D	L	GF	GA	GD	Pts	Qualification or relegation
1	Yangon United	22	17	3	2	61	27	+34	54	Mekong Club Championship and AFC Champions League Preliminary Round 1
2	Yadanarbon FC	22	14	4	4	53	30	+23	46	
3	Magwe	22	10	10	2	40	23	+17	40	
4	Ayeyawady United	22	10	6	6	38	29	+9	36	Qualification for the AFC Cup Group stage (Note: Ayeyawady United qualified for the 2016 AFC Cup as they won the 2015 Bogyoke Aung San Cup.)
5	Kanbawza FC	22	10	5	7	38	33	+5	35	
6	Zwegapin United	22	7	4	11	25	34	−9	25	
7	Hanthawaddy United	22	5	9	8	25	26	−1	24	
8	Zeyar Shwe Myay	22	5	8	9	30	38	−8	23	
9	Chin United	22	6	5	11	24	34	−10	23	
10	Rakhine United	22	6	3	13	27	47	−20	21	
11	Manaw Myay	22	5	5	12	21	41	−20	19 (Note: 1 point deducted?)	Relegation to MNL-2
12	Nay Pyi Taw	22	4	5	13	23	42	−19	17	Relegation to MNL-2

=== Result table ===
Home \ Away	AYA	CHU	HTU	KBZ	MAG	MNM	NPT	RUD	YAD	YGN	ZSM	ZKP
Ayeyarwady United		4–1	2–0	2–0	2–2	5–0	0–0	2–1	2–1	2–2	2–2	0–1
Chin United	1–0		0–0	1–1	0–2	1–0	2–1	2–4	3–1	0–2	2–2	0–1
Hanthawaddy United	4–0	1–1		0–0	1–2	2–1	2–2	1–1	0–1	2–3	1–0	0–0
Kanbawza	1–1	3–1	3–2		2–1	3–1	2–1	3–0	2–2	1–3	2–1	1–0
Magway	3–3	0–0	0–0	2–1		2–2	0–0	3–0	1–1	2–3	6–2	0–0
Manaw Myay	3–2	1–0	1–1	1–1	0–2		0–1	1–1	1–2	0–1	1–0	2–1
Nay Pyi Taw	0–1	2–0	1–2	3–4	1–4	2–1		0–0	0–3	1–2	1–0	1–3
Rakhine United	0–1	0–2	1–2	3–2	0–1	3–0	2–1		2–5	1–2	1–4	4–3
Yadanarbon	4–1	1–0	3–2	4–3	1–1	3–0	6–1	2–0		2–3	3–1	3–4
Yangon United	2–1	6–2	1–0	2–0	2–3	5–2	3–1	6–0	2–3		5–2	3–0
Zeyar Shwe Myay	0–2	2–1	1–1	0–2	1–1	3–1	3–3	2–0	1–1	1–1		2–1
Zwegabin United	1–3	0–3	2–1	2–1	1–2	0–2	1–0	2–3	0–1	2–2	0–0	

Updated to match(es) played on 31 October 2015. Source:
Legend: Blue = home team win; Yellow = draw; Red = away team win.

== Matches ==
Fixtures and Results of the Myanmar National League 2015 season.

=== Week 1 ===
2015-01-10	Zweagabin United FC	0–0	Zeyar Shwe Myay FC	Aung San Stadium, Yangon
16:00 UTC+06:30

2015-01-10	Hanthawaddy United	1–1	Chin United	Thuwunna Stadium, Yangon
15:30 UTC+06:30

2015-01-11	Nay Pyi Taw FC	0–1	Ayeyawady United	Paung Laung Stadium, Nay Pyi Taw
16:00 UTC+06:30

2015-01-11	Manaw Myay FC	1–1	Kanbawza FC	Aung San Stadium, Yangon
16:00 UTC+06:30

2015-01-11	Yadanarbon FC	1–1	Magwe	Bahtoo Stadium, Mandalay
16:00 UTC+06:30

2015-01-11	Yangon United	6–0	Rakhine United FC	Yangon United Sports Complex, Yangon
16:00 UTC+06:30

=== Week 2 ===
2015-01-17	Zeyar Shwe Myay FC	0–2	Kanbawza FC	Monywa Stadium, Sagaing
16:00 UTC+06:30

2015-01-17	Zwegabin United	1–3	Ayeyawady United	Thuwunna Stadium, Yangon
15:30 UTC+06:30

2015-01-17	Yangon United FC	1–0	Hanthawaddy United	Yangon United Sports Complex, Yangon
16:00 UTC+06:30

2015-01-18	Rakhine United	0–1	Magwe FC	Thuwunna Stadium, Yangon
16:00 UTC+06:30

2015-01-18	Nay Pyi Taw FC	0–3	Yadanarbon FC	Paung Laung Stadium, Nay Pyi Taw
16:00 UTC+06:30

2015-01-18	Chin United	1–0	Manaw Myay FC	Aung San Stadium, Yangon
16:00 UTC+06:30

=== Week 3 ===
2015-01-24	Yadanarbon FC	2–0	Rakhine United FC	Bahtoo Stadium, Mandalay
16:00 UTC+06:30

2015-01-24	Zeyar Shwe Myay FC	2–1	Chin United FC	Monywa Stadium, Sagaing
15:30 UTC+06:30

2015-01-24	Ayeyawady United FC	5–0	Manaw Myay FC	Ayar Stadium, Ayeyawady
16:00 UTC+06:30

2015-01-24	Hanthawaddy United FC	0–0	Kanbawza FC	Thuwunna Stadium, Yangon
16:00 UTC+06:30

2015-01-25	Magwe FC	0–0	Nay Pyi Taw FC	Thuwunna Stadium, Yangon
16:00 UTC+06:30

2015-01-25	Yangon United FC	3–0	Zwegabin United FC	Yangon United Sports Complex, Yangon
16:00 UTC+06:30

=== Week 4 ===
2015-01-30	Manaw Myay FC	1–2	Yadanarbon FC	Thuwunna Stadium, Yangon
16:00 UTC+06:30

2015-01-31	Hanthawaddy United FC	2–2	Nay Pyi Taw FC	Aung San Stadium, Yangon
16:00 UTC+06:30

2015-01-31	Kanbawza FC	3–0	Rakhine United FC	KBZ Stadium, Taunggyi
16:00 UTC+06:30

2015-01-31	Chin United FC	0–2	Yangon United FC	Thuwunna Stadium, Yangon
16:00 UTC+06:30

2015-02-01	Zeyar Shwe Myay FC	0–2	Ayeyawady United FC	Monywa Stadium, Sagaing
16:00 UTC+06:30

2015-02-01	Zwegabin United FC	1- 2	Magwe FC	Aung San Stadium, Yangon
16:00 UTC+06:30

=== Week 5 ===
2015-02-07	Nay Pyi Taw FC	1–2	Yangon United FC	Paung Laung Stadium, Nay Pyi Taw
16:00 UTC+06:30

2015-02-07	Ayeyawady United FC	2–1	Rakhine United FC	Ayar Stadium, Ayeyawady
15:30 UTC+06:30

2015-02-07	Hanthawaddy United FC	1–2	Magwe FC	Thuwunna Stadium, Yangon
16:00 UTC+06:30

2015-02-08	Zwegabin United FC	0–2	Manaw Myay FC	Thuwunna Stadium, Yangon
16:00 UTC+06:30

2015-02-08	Chin United FC	1–1	Kanbawza FC	Aung San Stadium, Yangon
16:00 UTC+06:30

2015-02-08	Yadanarbon FC	3–1	Zayar Shwe Myay FC	Bahtoo Stadium, Mandalay
16:00 UTC+06:30

=== Week 6 ===
2015-02-14	Yangon United FC	5–2	Manaw Myay FC	Yangon United Sports Complex, Yangon
16:00 UTC+06:30

2015-02-14	Zeyar Shwe Myay FC	1–1	Hanthawaddy United FC	Monywa Stadium, Sagaing
15:30 UTC+06:30

2015-02-24	Kanbawza FC	2–1	Nay Pyi Taw FC	KBZ Stadium, Taunggyi
16:00 UTC+06:30

2015-02-14	Chin United FC	3–1	Yadanarbon FC	Thuwunna Stadium, Yangon
16:00 UTC+06:30

2015-02-14	Magwe FC	3–3	Ayeyawady United FC	Aung San Stadium, Yangon
16:00 UTC+06:30

2015-02-08	Rakhine United FC	4–3	Zwegabin United FC	Aung San Stadium, Yangon
16:00 UTC+06:30

=== Week 7 ===
2015-06-22	Chin United FC	1–0	Ayeyawady United FC	Aung San Stadium, Yangon
16:00 UTC+06:30

2015-02-21	Hanthawaddy United	0–1	Yadanarbon FC	Thuwunna Stadium, Yangon
15:30 UTC+06:30

2015-02-21	Magwe FC	2–3	Yangon United FC	Aung San Stadium, Yangon
16:00 UTC+06:30

2015-02-22	Rakhine FC	3–0	Manaw Myay FC	Thuwunna Stadium, Yangon
16:00 UTC+06:30

2015-02-22	Kanbawza FC	1–0	Zwegabin United FC	KBZ Stadium, Taunggyi
16:00 UTC+06:30

2015-02-22	Nay Pyi Taw FC	1–0	Zeyar Shwe Myay FC	Paung Laung Stadium, Nay Pyi Taw
16:00 UTC+06:30

=== Week 8 ===
2015-02-28	Magwe FC	6–2	Zeyar Shwe Myay FC	Monywa Stadium, Sagaing
16:00 UTC+06:30

2015-02-28	Rakhine United FC	0–2	Chin United FC	Thuwunna Stadium, Yangon
15:30 UTC+06:30

2015-03-01	Manaw Myay FC	1–1	Hanthawaddy United	Aung San Stadium, Yangon
16:00 UTC+06:30

2015-03-01	Zwegabin United FC	1–0	Nay Pyi Taw FC	Thuwunna Stadium, Yangon
16:00 UTC+06:30

2015-03-01	Kanbawza FC	1–3	Yangon United FC	KBZ Stadium, Taunggyi
16:00 UTC+06:30

2015-03-02	Ayeyawady United FC	2–1	Yadanarbon FC	Ayar Stadium, Ayeyawady
16:00 UTC+06:30

=== Week 9 ===
2015-03-06	Zwegabin United FC	0–1	Yadanarbon FC	Aung San Stadium, Yangon
16:00 UTC+06:30

2015-03-07	Ayeyawady United FC	2–0	Kanbawza FC	Ayar Stadium, Ayeyawady
15:30 UTC+06:30

2015-03-07	Manaw Myay FC	0–2	Magwe FC	Thuwunna Stadium, Yangon
16:00 UTC+06:30

2015-03-08	Yangon United FC	5–2	Zeyar Shwe Myay FC	Yangon United Sports Complex, Yangon
16:00 UTC+06:30

2015-03-08	Nay Pyi Taw FC	2–0	Chin United FC	Paung Laung Stadium, Nay Pyi Taw
16:00 UTC+06:30

2015-03-08	Hanthawaddy United FC	1–1	Rakhine United FC	Aung San Stadium, Yangon
16:00 UTC+06:30

=== Week 10 ===
2015-06-27	Manaw Myay FC	0–1	Nay Pyi Taw FC	Aung San Stadium, Yangon
16:00 UTC+06:30

2015-03-27	Yangon United FC	2–1	Ayeyawady United FC	Yangon United Sports Complex, Yangon
16:00 UTC+06:30

2015-06-27	Rakhine United FC	1–4	Zeyar Shwe Myay FC	Thuwunna Stadium, Yangon
16:00 UTC+06:30

2015-06-28	Magwe FC	0–0	Chin United FC	Aung San Stadium, Yangon
16:00 UTC+06:30

2015-06-28	Hanthawaddy United FC	0–0	Zwegabin United FC	Thuwunna Stadium, Yangon
16:00 UTC+06:30

2015-06-28	Kanbawza FC	2–2	Yadanarbon FC	KBZ Stadium, Taunggyi
16:00 UTC+06:30

=== Week 11 ===
2015-07-04	Zeyar Shwe Myay FC	3–1	Manaw Myay FC	Monywa Stadium, Sagaing
16:00 UTC+06:30

2015-07-04	Chin United FC	0–1	Zwegabin United FC	Aung San Stadium, Yangon
15:30 UTC+06:30

2015-07-04	Nay Pyi Taw FC	0–0	Rakhine United FC	Paung Laung Stadium, Nay Pyi Taw
16:00 UTC+06:30

2015-07-04	Ayeyawady United FC	2–0	Hanthawaddy United FC	Ayar stadium, Ayeyawady
16:00 UTC+06:30

2015-07-05	Magwe FC	2–0	Kanbawza FC	Thuwunna Stadium, Yangon
16:00 UTC+06:30

2015-07-05	Yadanarbon FC	2–3	Yangon United FC	Bahtoo Stadium, Mandalay
16:00 UTC+06:30

=== Week 12 ===
2015-07-17	Hanthawaddy United	2–3	Yangon United	Thuwunna Stadium, Yangon
16:00 UTC+06:30

2015-07-18	Kanbawza FC	2–1	Zeyar Shwe Myay	KBZ Stadium, Taunggyi
15:30 UTC+06:30

2015-07-18	Ayeyawady United	0–1	Zwegapin United	Ayar Stadium, Ayeyawady
16:00 UTC+06:30

2015-07-18	Magwe	3–0	Rakhine United	Aung San Stadium, Yangon
15:30 UTC+06:30

2015-07-18	Yadanarbon FC	6–1	Nay Pyi Taw	Bahtoo Stadium, Mandalay
16:00 UTC+06:30	Yan Paing 85'

2015-07-18	Manaw Myay	1–0	Chin United	Thuwunna Stadium, Yangon
16:00 UTC+06:30

=== Week 13 ===
2015-07-25	Nay Pyi Taw FC	2–1	Manaw Myay FC	Paung Laung Stadium, Nay Pyi Taw
15:30 UTC+06:30

2015-07-25	Ayeyawady United FC	2–2	Yangon United FC	Ayar Stadium, Ayeyawady
15:30 UTC+06:30

2015-07-25	Zeyar Shwe Myay	2–0	Rakhine United	Monywa Stadium, Sagaing
16:00 UTC+06:30

2015-07-26	Chin United FC	0–2	Magwe	Thuwunna Stadium, Yangon
15:30 UTC+06:30

2015-07-26	Zwegabin United	2–1	Hanthawaddy United	Aung San Stadium, Yangon
16:00 UTC+06:30

2015-07-26	Yadanarbon FC	4–3	Kanbawza FC	Bahtoo Stadium, Mandalay
16:00 UTC+06:30

=== Week 14 ===
2015-08-08	Yangon United	3–1	Nay Pyi Taw	Yangon United Sports Complex, Yangon
15:30 UTC+06:30

2015-08-08	Rakhine United	0–1	Ayeyawady United	Thuwunna Stadium, Yangon
16:00 UTC+06:30

2015-10-21	Zeyar Shwe Myay	1–1	Yadanarbon FC	Aung San Stadium, Yangon
15:30 UTC+06:30	Phyo Paing Soe 70'		Keith Martu Nah 65'	Referee: U Win Htut

2015-08-09	Kanbawza FC	3–1	Chin United	KBZ Stadium, Taunggyi
16:00 UTC+06:30

2015-08-09	Magwe	0–0	Hanthawaddy United	Aung San Stadium, Yangon
16:00 UTC+06:30

2015-08-09	Manaw Myay	2–1	Zwegapin United	Thuwunna Stadium, Yangon
16:00 UTC+06:30

=== Week 15 ===
2015-08-15	Manaw Myay	0–1	Yangon United	Bogyoke Aung San Stadium, Yangon
16:00 UTC+06:30			César Augusto 18'

2015-08-15	Hanthawaddy United	1–0	Zeyar Shwe Myay	Thuwunna Stadium, Yangon
15:30 UTC+06:30	Bamba 70'

2015-10-28	Ayeyawady United	2–2	Magwe	Ayar Stadium, Ayeyawady
16:00 UTC+06:30	Yan Paing Soe 47'; Sim 90+4'		Htoo Htoo Aung 25'; Soe Min Naing 51'	Referee: U Thant Zin Oo

2015-08-16	Nay Pyi Taw	3–4	Kanbawza FC	Paung Laung Stadium, Nay Pyi Taw
15:30 UTC+06:30

2015-08-16	Yadanarbon FC	1–0	Chin United	Bahtoo Stadium, Mandalay
16:00 UTC+06:30	Yan Paing 85'

2015-08-16	Zwegapin United	2–3	Rakhine United	Thuwunna Stadium, Yangon
16:00 UTC+06:30

=== Week 17 ===
2015-09-12	Zeyar Shwe Myay	2–1	Zwegapin United	Monywa Stadium, Sagaing
16:00 UTC+06:30	Ye Htet Aung 49'; Victor Coto Ortega 64'		Zivkovic 59'

2015-09-12	Chin United	0–0	Hanthawaddy United	Thuwunna Stadium, Yangon
15:30 UTC+06:30

2015-09-12	Ayeyawady United	0–0	Nay Pyi Taw	Ayar Stadium, Ayeyarwady Division
16:00 UTC+06:30

2015-09-13	Kanbawza	3–1	Manaw Myay	Taunggyi Stadium, Shan
15:30 UTC+06:30	Kyaw Zayar Win 64'; Mohamed Arif 73'; Caleb Folan 77'		Amaobi 56'

2015-09-13	Magway FC	1–1	Yadanarbon	Thuwunna Stadium, Yangon
16:00 UTC+06:30	D Jam 77'		Ye Ko Oo 56'

2015-09-13	Rakhine United	1–2	Yangon United	Bogyoke Aung San Stadium, Yangon
16:00 UTC+06:30	Pyi Moe 27'		Kyaw Ko Ko 13'; César Augusto 17'

=== Week 18 ===
2015-09-18	Hanthawaddy United	4–0	Ayeyawady United	Thuwunna Stadium, Yangon
16:00 UTC+06:30	George 54'; Bamba 63', 72'; Ousmanou 79'

2015-09-18	Kanbawza FC	2–1	Magwe	Taunggyi Stadium, Taunggyi
15:30 UTC+06:30	Giorgi 6'; Caleb Folan 28'		Nanda Kyaw 22'	Referee: U Win Kyaw Oo

2015-09-18	Yangon United	2–3	Yadanarbon FC	Yangon United Sports Complex, Yangon
16:00 UTC+06:30	Kyaw Ko Ko 14'; Zaw Min Tun 75'		Aung Thu 22'; Ye Ko Oo 32'; Myo Ko Tun 58'

2015-09-18	Rakhine United	2–1	Nay Pyi Taw	Thuwunna Stadium, Yangon
15:30 UTC+06:30	Marcio Santos 16'; Pyi Moe 28'		Happiness 90' (pen.)

2015-09-19	Manaw Myay	1–0	Zeyar Shwe Myay	Thuwunna Stadium, Yangon
16:00 UTC+06:30	Ibrahim 48'			Referee: U Zaw Khine

2015-09-19	Zwegapin United	0–3	Chin United	Bogyoke Aung San Stadium, Yangon
16:00 UTC+06:30			Chit Su Moe 61'; Suan Lam Mang 63', 83'

=== Week 19 ===
2015-09-23	Yadanarbon FC	3–2	Hanthawaddy United	Bahtoo Stadium, Mandalay
16:00 UTC+06:30	Dwe Ko Ko Chit 25'; Win Naing Soe 50', 90' (4)		George 75', 83'	Referee: U Zaw Khine

2015-09-23	Yangon United	2–3	Magwe	Yangon United Sports Complex, Yangon
15:30 UTC+06:30	César Augusto 1'; Khin Maung Lwin 29'		Nanda Kyaw 27', 54'; Sylla 57'

2015-09-23	Ayeyawady United	4–1	Chin United	Ayar Stadium, Ayeyawady Division
16:00 UTC+06:30	Aung Kyaw Naing 27', 37'; Thiha Zaw 69'; Pyae Phyo Oo 90' (2)		Suan Lam Mang 50'

2015-09-24	Manaw Myay	1–1	Rakhine United	Thuwunna Stadium, Yangon
16:00 UTC+06:30	Aung Moe Lwin 38'		Pyi Moe 5'

2015-09-24	Zwegapin United	2–1	Kanbawza FC	Bogyoke Aung San Stadium, Yangon
15:30 UTC+06:30	Sai Min Tun 15'; Junior 47'		Hla Aye Htwe 54'

2015-09-24	Zeyar Shwe Myay	3–3	Nay Pyi Taw	Monywa Stadium, Sagaing Division
16:00 UTC+06:30	Alexender 49'; Nay Min Aung 51', 64'		Soe Thurein Tun 20'; Akoufoe 32', 45'

=== Week 16 ===
2015-09-29	Hanthawaddy United	2–1	Manaw Myay	Aung San Stadium, Yangon
16:00 UTC+06:30	Ousmanou 10'; Aung Myo Thu Ra 45'		Aung Myint Tun 25'

2015-09-30	Yangon United	2–0	Kanbawza FC	Yangon United Sports Complex, Yangon
15:30 UTC+06:30	Kyaw Ko Ko 14'; César Augusto 69'

2015-09-30	Chin United	2–4	Rakhine United	Aung San Stadium, Yangon
16:00 UTC+06:30	Chit Su Moe 66'; Suan Lam Mang 90' (pen.)		Marcio 6', 43' (pen.); Aung Soe Moe 35'; Aung Khine Tun 90+3'

2015-09-30	Zeyar Shwe Myay	1–1	Magwe	Monywa Stadium, Sagaing
15:30 UTC+06:30	Naing oo Lwin 58'		Soe Min Naing 59' (pen.)

2015-09-30	Nay Pyi Taw	1–3	Zwegapin United	Paung Laung Stadium, Nay Pyi Taw
15:30 UTC+06:30	Akoufoe 25'		Sai Min Tun 13'; Tihomir Zivkovic 69'; Htet Zaw Tun 71'

2015-10-01	Yadanarbon	4–1	Ayeyawady United	Bahtoo Stadium, Mandalay
15:30 UTC+06:30	Maximum 5'; Keith Martu Nah 31'; Aung Thu 49'; Yeon Gisung 76'		Sim Woo Sub 67'

=== Week 20 ===
2015-10-17	Yadanarbon FC	3–4	Zwegapin United	Bahtoo Stadium, Mandalay
16:00 UTC+06:30	Moukailou 65'; Aung Thu 84'; Keith Martu Nah 90+6'		Kaung Si Thu 33', 38'; Sai Min Tun 45+2'; Ko Ko Hein 85'

2015-10-17	Magwe	2–2	Manaw Myay	Thuwunna Stadium, Yangon
16:00 UTC+06:30	Cho Tun 22'; Htoo Htoo Aung 62'		Zin Min Tun 18'; Sa Htet Naing Win 50'	Referee: U Aung Thu

2015-10-17	Zeyar Shwe Myay	1–1	Yangon United	Monywa Stadium, Sagaing
15:30 UTC+06:30	Victor Coto 60'		Kyaw Ko Ko 66'

2015-10-18	Chin United	2–1	Nay Pyi Taw	Thuwunna Stadium, Yangon
15:30 UTC+06:30	Idoko Sunday Mathrew 20', 45'		Nay Zaw Aung 10'

2015-10-18	Rakhine United	1–2	Hanthawaddy United	Aung San Stadium, Yangon
16:00 UTC+06:30	Marcio Santos 60'		George 28'; Bamba 33'

2015-10-18	Kanbawza FC	1–1	Ayeyawady United	Taunggyi Stadium, Taunggyi
15:30 UTC+06:30	Caleb Folan 42'		West 45+2'	Referee: U Win Kyaw Oo

=== Week 21 ===
2015-10-24	Rakhine United	2–5	Yadanarbon FC	Thuwunna Stadium, Yangon
16:00 UTC+06:30	Pyay Moe 85'; Mercio 90+1'		Dwe Ko Ko Chit 2', 25'; Keith Martu Nah 23', 29'; Myo Ko Tun 56'	Referee: U Thant Zin Oo

2015-10-24	Chin United	2–2	Zeyar Shwe Myay	Aung San Stadium, Yangon
16:00 UTC+06:30	Suan Lam Mang 36', 38'		Victor Coto 15'; Ye Htet Aung 20'

2015-10-24	Kanbawza FC	3–2	Hanthawaddy United	Taunggyi Stadium, Taunggyi
15:30 UTC+06:30	Caleb Folan 10'; Giorgi 15', 90+5'		Maung Maung Lwin 25'; Bamba 55'	Referee: U Tint Naing Htwe

2015-10-24	Nay Pyi Taw	1–4	Magwe	Paung Laung Stadium, Nay Pyi Taw
15:30 UTC+06:30	Aung Myo Khant 10'		Sylla 8'; Soe Min Naing 64'; Djam 84'; Maung Maung Soe 90+1'

2015-10-25	Zwegapin United	2–2	Yangon United	Thuwunna Stadium, Yangon
16:00 UTC+06:30	Sai Min Tun 6'; Thein Zaw 35'		Kyaw Ko Ko 9'; Than Paing 71'

2015-10-25	Manaw Myay	3–2	Ayeyawady United	Aung San Stadium, Yangon
15:30 UTC+06:30	Ibrahim 20', 67'; Amaobi 71'		Riste Naumov 5' (pen.); Thiha Zaw 27'	Referee: U Zaw Khing

=== Week 22 ===
2015-10-30	Yangon United	6–2	Chin United	Yangon United Sports Complex, Yangon
15:30 UTC+06:30	César Augusto 27', 51', 54', 58', 88'; Than Paing 84'		Idoko Sunday Mathew 68', 82'

2015-10-31	Ayeyawady United FC	2–2	Zeyar Shwe Myay	AyarStadium, Ayeyawady
15:30 UTC+06:30	Moe Win 55' (pen.), 88' (pen.)		Victor Coto 34'; Naing Oo Lwin 66'	Referee: U Tin Naing Htwe

2015-10-31	Yadanarbon FC	3–0	Manaw Myay	Bahtoo Stadium, Mandalay
16:00 UTC+06:30	Win Naing Soe 57', 80', 84' (pen.)

2015-10-31	Rakhine United	3–2	Kanbawza FC	Aung San Stadium, Yangon
16:00 UTC+06:30	Aung Soe Moe 28'; Nyi Nyi Naing 56'; Pyae Moe 78'		Obadin 18'; Caleb Folan 51'

2015-10-31	Nay Pyi Taw	1–2	Hanthawaddy United	Thuwunna Stadium, Yangon
16:00 UTC+06:30	Soe Thu Rain Tun 90+4'		Bamba 34'; Kyaw Zaya 90'

2015-11-31	Magwe	0–0	Zwegapin United	Thuwunna Stadium, Yangon
18:30 UTC+06:30				Referee: U Aung Thu

== Top scorers ==
No	Name	Club	Goal
1	(Brazil) César Augusto	Yangon United	28
2	(Republic of Ireland) Caleb Folan	Kanbawza FC	12
3	(Myanmar) Kyaw Ko Ko	Yangon United	12
4	(Myanmar) Soe Min Naing	Magway	12
5	(Myanmar) Suan Lam Mang	Chin United	11
6	(Liberia) Keith Martu Nah	Yadanarbon FC	10
7	(North Macedonia) Riste Naumov	Ayeyawady United	10
8	(Nigeria) Idoko Sunday Mathew	Chin United	7
9	(Guinea) Sylla Sekou	Magway	7
10	(Myanmar) Kyaw Zayar Win	Kanbawza FC	7
11	(Croatia) Tihomir Zivkovic	Zwegapin United	7
12	(Brazil) Emerson Luiz	Yangon United	6

== Summary ==
- Yangon United won the 2015 MNL champion.
- Ayeyawady United won the 2015 General Aung San Shield champion.
- César Augusto scored 28 league goals and won golden boot.
- Manaw Myay and Nay Pyi Taw relegated to MNL-2. First time for Nay Pyi Taw.
- Yangon United was a best attacking team (61 goals) and Magwe was a best defending team (23 goals).
- Three local players include in 2015 MNL Top 1–5 Soccers List.
- Yangon United got 2016 AFC Champions League entrance and Ayeyawady United got 2016 AFC Cup entrance.
