= Yan Aung Kyaw =

Burmese footballer

Personal information
- Full name: Yan Aung Kyaw
- Date of birth: 4 August 1986 (age 40)
- Place of birth: Yangon, Myanmar
- Height: 1.75 m (5 ft 9 in)
- Position: Defensive midfielder

Senior career*
Years	Team	Apps	(Gls)
2009–2020	Yangon United	246	(3)

International career^{‡}
2011	Myanmar U23	4	(0)
2011–2019	Myanmar	64	(0)
- * Club domestic league appearances and goals as of 2 Oct 2020 ‡ National team caps and goals as of 5 October 2017

Yan Aung Kyaw (Burmese: ရန်အောင်ကျော်; born 4 August 1986) is a Burmese retired footballer who played as a midfielder for the Myanmar national football team. He is the three time Myanmar National League winner with Yangon United and the bronze medalist with Myanmar U23 in 2011 SEA Games.

== International ==
As of match played 6 June 2019

Appearances and goals by national team and year
National team	Year	Apps	Goals
Myanmar	2011	6	0
Myanmar	2012	8	0
Myanmar	2013	4	0
Myanmar	2014	11	0
Myanmar	2015	10	0
Myanmar	2016	12	0
Myanmar	2017	8	0
Myanmar	2018	1	0
Myanmar	2019	3	0
Total		64	0

== Honours ==
=== National team ===
- Philippine Peace Cup (1): 2014

=== Club ===
Yangon United

- Myanmar National League (4): 2011, 2012, 2013, 2015
- MFF Cup (1): 2011
