= Assalé =

Assalé is both a given name and a surname. Notable people with the name include:

- Assalé Molo Hilaire, Ivorian footballer
- Charles Assalé (1911–1999) Cameroonian politician
- Roger Assalé (born 1993), Ivorian footballer
