= Nyi Nyi Min =

Burmese footballer

Personal information
- Full name: Nyi Nyi Min
- Date of birth: 1 October 1994 (age 32)
- Position: Midfielder

Team information
- Current team: Chin United
- Number: 29

Senior career*
| Years | Team | Apps | (Gls) |
| 2009–12 | Manaw Myay | | |
| 2012–15 | Ayeyawady United | | |
| 2016 | Rakhine United | | |
| 2016– | Chin United | | |

International career^{‡}
| 2012– | Myanmar | 1 | (0) |
| 2012– | Myanmar U-22 | 2 | (0) |
- * Club domestic league appearances and goals ‡ National team caps and goals as of 18 April 2016

Nyi Nyi Min (Burmese: ညီညီမင်း; born 1 October 1994) is a footballer from Burma, and a midfielder for Myanmar national football team and Myanmar U-22 football team. He currently plays for Chin United in Myanmar National League.
