= Marcelo Cirelli =

Argentine footballer and manager

Personal information
- Full name: Juan Marcelo Cirelli
- Date of birth: 2 April 1984 (age 42)
- Place of birth: Buenos Aires, Argentina
- Height: 1.83 m (6 ft 0 in)
- Position: Centre-back

Team information
- Current team: Yangon United (head coach)

Youth career
- 1998–1999: River Plate
- 2000–2002: Gimnasia La Plata
- 2003–2004: Ferro Carril Oeste

Senior career*
Years	Team	Apps	(Gls)
2005	Ferro Carril Oeste	23	(3)
2005–2006	Johor FC	28	(0)
2007–2008	Kuala Lumpur	21	(4)
2009	Zeyashwemye	15	(2)
2009	Persebaya Surabaya	9	(0)
2010–2012	Persidafon Dafonsoro	54	(11)
2012–2013	Persibo Bojonegoro	18	(1)
2013–2014	Persis Solo	6	(2)
2014–2015	Flandria	27	(0)
Total		201	(23)

Managerial career
- 2020–2021: PSBS Biak
- 2026-: Yangon United
- * Club domestic league appearances and goals

Juan Marcelo Cirelli (born 2 April 1984) is an Argentinean professional football coach and former football player, he is the currently head coach of Myanmar National League club Yangon United.
