= Aleksandar Vasilev (Macedonian footballer) =

Macedonian footballer

Personal information
- Full name: Aleksandar Vasilev
- Date of birth: 3 July 1985 (age 41)
- Place of birth: Strumica, SFR Yugoslavia
- Height: 1.91 m (6 ft 3 in)
- Position: Center back

Senior career*
Years	Team	Apps	(Gls)
- Sileks
2008	Makedonija		
2008–2010	Horizont Turnovo	29	(1)
2010–2011	Alta	45	(1)
2012	Rabotnički	9	(0)
2012–2013	Napredok	20	(0)
2014	Yangon United		
2015–2016	Zeyashwemye		
2016–2017	Horizont Turnovo	15	(1)
2017	Bregalnica Štip		
2018	Belasica		
2018–2019	Struga		
2019	Labunishta		
2020	Ohrid		
- * Club domestic league appearances and goals

Aleksandar Vasilev (born 3 July 1985) is a retired footballer from North Macedonia.
