= Aung Kyaw Naing =

Burmese footballer

Personal information
- Full name: Aung Kyaw Naing
- Date of birth: 20 December 1994 (age 31)
- Place of birth: Thongwa, Myanmar
- Height: 1.67 m (5 ft 5 1/2 in)
- Positions: Winger; attacking midfielder

Team information
- Current team: Ayeyawady United
- Number: 10

Youth career
- –2013: Nay Pyi Taw

Senior career*
Years	Team	Apps	(Gls)
2013–2014	Nay Pyi Taw	22	(9)
2015–2016	Ayeyawady United	29	(13)
2017	Nay Pyi Taw	5	(1)
2017	Balestier Khalsa	26	(3)
2018	Ayeyawady United	9	(2)
2018	Angthong	6	(1)
2018–2019	Ayeyawady United	29	(8)
2019–2021	Yangon United	9	(3)
2021	Pattaya Dolphins United	2	(1)
2022–2023	Ranong United	25	(1)
2023	Druk Lhayul	16	(21)
2024	Dagon Star United	1	(0)
2025-	Ayeyawady United		

International career^{‡}
2015	Myanmar U23	1	(0)
2014–	Myanmar	4	(0)
Medal record
Myanmar U23
Sea Games
Silver medal – second place	2015 Singapore	Football
- * Club domestic league appearances and goals as of 6 December 2023 ‡ National team caps and goals as of 21 February 2026

Aung Kyaw Naing (အောင်ကျော်နိုင်; born 20 December 1994) is a Burmese professional footballer.

== Club career ==
Aung started his career with Nay Pyi Taw FC. While playing for the club, he won the 2013 MFF Young Player of the Year award.

=== Balestier Khalsa ===
Aung moved to S.League side Balestier Khalsa in February 2017 from Nay Pyi Taw alongside his fellow countrymen, Nanda Lin Kyaw Chit and Kyaw Zayar Win, completing the Tigers' foreign signing slots.

He scored his first goal for the club in a league game against the Young Lions, after missing a penalty in the first half, winning the club's first win and points of the season.

=== Druk Lhayul ===
Ahead 2023–24 season, Aung Kyaw Naing decided to go abroad for the first time to Bhutan and joined Bhutan Premier League side Druk Lhayul. He became the first Myanmar professional footballer to play in Bhutan.

== Career statistics ==
Appearances and goals by club team and year
Club team	Year	Apps	Goals	Assists
Druk Lhayul	2023–2024	16	21	9
Total		16	21	9

== International career ==
Aung was part of the Myanmar U-23 team that won the silver medal in the 2015 Southeast Asian Games.

He has 4 caps for the Myanmar national football team in 2 friendly matches, scoring no goal.

== Honours ==
=== International ===
- 2015 SEA Games Football: Silver

=== Individual ===
- MFF Young Player of the Year: 2013
