= Soe Myat Thu =

Burmese footballer

Personal information
- Full name: Soe Myat Thu
- Date of birth: 10 October 1989 (age 37)
- Place of birth: Pyay, Yangon, Myanmar
- Position: Striker

Team information
- Current team: Southern Myanmar
- Number: 4

Senior career*
Years	Team	Apps	(Gls)
2009–	Southern Myanmar		

International career^{‡}
2011	Myanmar	3	(0)
- * Club domestic league appearances and goals as of 2 August 2017 ‡ National team caps and goals as of 2 October 2012

Soe Myat Thu (Burmese: စိုးမြတ်သူ; born 10 October 1989) is a footballer from Burma, and a striker for Myanmar national football team. He currently plays for Zeyar Shwe Myay FC in Myanmar National League.
