= 2011 Myanmar National League =

Myanmar National League
- Season: 2011
- Champions: Yangon United
- 2012 AFC Cup: Yangon United; Ayeyawady United
- Matches: 132
- Goals: 360 (2.73 per match)

The 2011 MNL Grand Royal is the Myanmar National League's second full regular season.

== League table ==
Below is the league table for 2011 season. Yangon United FC secured their first ever championship in this season and have also become champions of 2011 Max Cement MFF Cup. This is the first time a team has win both cup and championship in short MNL history.

Pos	Team	Pld	W	D	L	GF	GA	GD	Pts	Qualification
1	Yangon United (C)	22	17	3	2	50	15	+35	54	2012 AFC Cup group stage
2	Ayeyawady United	22	15	7	0	41	11	+30	52	2012 AFC Cup qualifying play-off (Note: Automatically advanced to the group stage due to restructuring of the East Zone playoffs)
3	Zeya Shwe Myay	22	14	3	5	46	25	+21	45	
4	Kanbawza	22	9	6	7	27	21	+6	33	
5	Okktha United	22	9	6	7	27	26	+1	33	
6	Naypyidaw	22	8	6	8	33	28	+5	30	
7	Magway	22	8	6	8	32	32	0	30	
8	Southern Myanmar United	22	5	10	7	23	25	−2	25	
9	Yadanabon	22	6	5	11	28	31	−3	23	
10	Manaw Myay	22	4	6	12	18	33	−15	18	
11	Rakhapura United	22	4	6	12	24	42	−18	18	
12	Zwegabin United	22	1	0	21	11	71	−60	3	

Source: Myanmar National League
(C) Champions

== See also ==
- 2011 in Burmese football
