= Cezar Augusto =

Brazilian footballer (born 1986)

Personal information
- Full name: Cezar Augusto Hermenegildo
- Date of birth: 13 March 1986 (age 40)
- Place of birth: Monte Azul Paulista, Brazil
- Height: 1.82 m (6 ft 0 in)
- Position: Forward

Youth career
- 2003–2004: Botafogo SP

Senior career*
Years	Team	Apps	(Gls)
2005–2007	Atlético Mineiro	50	(26)
2007	→ CRB (Loan)	10	(11)
2008–2009	Red Bull Brasil	52	(29)
2009	Tupi	15	(5)
2010	Monte Azul	14	(7)
2010	Fluminense (Loan)	15	(2)
2011	Monte Azul	17	(8)
2011	→ Francana (Loan)	20	(11)
2012	Bacabal	9	(8)
2012–2015	Yangon United	100	(105)
2015–2016	FK Sarajevo	5	(4)
2017	Yangon United	11	(13)
Total		318	(229)
- * Club domestic league appearances and goals

Cezar Augusto Hermenegildo (born 13 March 1986), commonly known as Cezar Augusto, is a Brazilian former professional footballer who played as a forward. He is Yangon United's and Myanmar National League's all-time highest goalscorer with 118 Goals.

== Career ==
On 30 September 2015 Cezar Augusto scored his 100th MNL goal in a 2-0 win over Kanbawza, becoming the first player to reach this statistic.

On 24 November 2015, Cezar Augusto signed a two-year contract with Bosnian Premijer liga side FK Sarajevo, before having his contract terminated by mutual consent on 23 March 2017.

On 11 May 2017, Cezar Augusto re-signed for Yangon United on a contract until the end of the 2017 season.

== Career statistics ==
As of 2017

Appearances and goals by club, season and competition
Club	Season	League			National Cup		Continental		Other		Total	
Club	Season	Division	Apps	Goals	Apps	Goals	Apps	Goals	Apps	Goals	Apps	Goals
FK Sarajevo	2015–16	Premijer liga BiH	3	0	2	0	–		–		5	0
Mitra Kukar	2017	Liga 1	0	0	—		—		0	0	0	0
Career total			3	0	2	0	—	—	0	0	5	0

== Honours ==
Atlético Mineiro

- Série B: 2006

Yangon United

- Myanmar National League: 2012, 2013, 2015

Individual

- Myanmar National League Top Scorer: 2013, 2014, 2015
- Myanmar National League All-time Top Scorer: 1st
