= Toni Dzangarovski =

Macedonian footballer

Personal information
- Date of birth: 17 June 1985 (age 41)
- Place of birth: Skopje, SFR Yugoslavia
- Position: Centre-back

Senior career*
Years	Team	Apps	(Gls)
–2011	Vardar	42	(3)
2011–2012	Gorno Lisiče		
2013	Zwekapin United		
2013–2015	Makedonija	12	(0)
2015–2016	Maziya S&RC		
2016–2017	FK Makedonija	22	(0)
- * Club domestic league appearances and goals

Toni Dzangarovski (Macedonian: Тони Џангаровски born 17 June 1985 in SR Macedonia, SFR Yugoslavia) is a Macedonian retired footballer who last played for FK Makedonija Gjorče Petrov in his home country.

== Club career ==
Spending his career predominantly in his native Macedonia, Dzangarovski sealed his first move abroad alongside Nikola Nikancevski in 2013 to Zwekapin United of the Myanmar National League on a one-year contract, making his debut in a 0–2 defeat to Yangon United.

Transferring to Maldivian team Maziya S&RC in 2015, the Macedonian defender was captain for the club, winning the 2016 Dhivehi Premier League and coming close to singing for KF Llapi of the Kosovo Superliga.
