= 2012 Myanmar National League =

Myanmar National League
- Season: 2012
- Champions: Yangon United; 2nd Myanmar National League title
- AFC Cup: Yangon United; Ayeyawady United
- Matches: 182
- Goals: 528 (2.9 per match)
- Top goalscorer: (Serbia) Saša Ranković (20 goals)
- Biggest home win: Yangon United 6 – 0 Chin United; Zeya Shwe Myay 7 – 1 Mawyawadi FC; Kanbawza 6 – 0 Mawyawadi FC
- Biggest away win: Mawyawadi FC 2 – 6 Kanbawza; Zwegabin United 1 – 6 Yangon United; Chin United 0 – 6 Yangon United; Zwegabin United 0 – 6 Kanbawza
- Highest scoring: Mawyawadi FC 2 – 6 Kanbawza; Hantharwady United 3 – 5 Yadanabon; Rakhapura United 5 – 3 Zeya Shwe Myay; Zeya Shwe Myay 7 – 1 Mawyawadi United

The Myanmar 2012 Myanmar National League season was the 3rd edition of Myanmar National League. The fixture schedule was released on second weeks of December 2011. The season began on 7 January 2012 and ended on 9 September 2012. The bottom two teams are relegated to yet-to-be-formed MNL-2.

Yangon United successfully pursued its 2012 Myanmar National League title.

== Teams ==
=== Personnel and kits ===
Note: Flags indicate national team as has been defined under FIFA eligibility rules. Players may hold more than one non-FIFA nationality.

Team	Manager	Shirt sponsor
Ayeyawady United	(Slovakia) Jozef Herel	awba
Chin United	(Myanmar) U San Win	-
Hantharwady United	(Myanmar) U Win Tin	IBTC
Kanbawza	(Singapore) PN Sivaji	KBZ
Magway	(Myanmar) U Kyi Lwin	JOMOO
Manaw Myay	(Myanmar) U Win Myint Twin	-
Mawyawadi FC		-
Naypyidaw	(Bulgaria) Minkovski	KTM
Rakhapura United	(Myanmar) U Han Tun	Yangon Transformer
Southern Myanmar United	(Australia) (England) Ken Worden	Yuzana
Yadanabon	(Brazil) Jose Alves Borges	Alipne
Yangon United	(Bulgaria) Ivan Venkov Kolev	airBagan
Zeya Shwe Myay	(Myanmar) U Soe Moe	Sky Net
Zwegabin United	(France) Yohan Girard	-

== League table ==
Pos	Team	Pld	W	D	L	GF	GA	GD	Pts	Qualification or relegation
1	Yangon United	26	18	6	2	69	17	+52	60	2013 AFC Cup Group stage
2	Kanbawza	26	18	5	3	64	25	+39	59	
3	Yadanabon	26	16	8	2	57	22	+35	56	
4	Zeya Shwe Myay	26	16	3	7	51	26	+25	51	
5	Ayeyawady United	26	13	7	6	45	31	+14	46	2013 AFC Cup Group stage (Note: Ayeyawady United qualified for the 2013 AFC Cup as they won the 2012 MFF Cup.)
6	Magway	26	12	8	6	39	21	+18	44	
7	Naypyidaw	26	12	6	8	38	25	+13	42	
8	Manaw Myay	26	10	6	10	32	32	0	36	
9	Hantharwady United	26	9	7	10	28	30	−2	34	
10	Rakhapura United	26	7	7	12	40	48	−8	28	
11	Southern Myanmar United	26	6	3	17	24	49	−25	21	
12	Zwegabin United	26	5	3	18	16	51	−35	18	
13	Mawyawadi FC	26	1	6	19	8	74	−66	9	Relegation to 2013 MNL-2
14	Chin United	26	1	3	22	17	77	−60	6	Relegation to 2013 MNL-2

Rules for classification: 1) points; 2) goal difference; 3) number of goals scored.

== Top scorers ==
No	Player	Club	Goals
1	(Serbia) Saša Ranković	Zeya Shwe Myay	20
2	(Ivory Coast) Adama Koné	Yadanabon	16
2	(Brazil) Nunez	Kanbawza	16
4	(Brazil) Leandro D. L	Naypyidaw	15
4	(Ivory Coast) Lassina Koné	Magway	15
4	(Brazil) Cezar Augusto	Yangon United	15
7	(Myanmar) Soe Min Oo	Kanbawza	13
7	(Ivory Coast) Molo Hilaire Assalé	Manaw Myay	13
9	(Brazil) Andrey	Rakhapura United	12
10	(Myanmar) Yan Paing	Yadanabon	11

== Awards ==
=== Monthly awards ===
Month	Manager of the Month		Player of the Month	
Month	Manager	Club	Player	Club
February	(Myanmar) U Win Myint Twin	Manaw Myay F.C	Man Sar	Manaw Myay F.C
March	(Slovakia) Jozef Herel	Ayeyawady United F.C	(Ivory Coast) Lassina Koné	Magway F.C
April/May	(Brazil) Jose Alves Borges	Yadanabon F.C	(Myanmar) Yan Paing	Yadanabon F.C
July	(Myanmar) U Soe Moe	Zeyashwemye F.C	(Brazil) Andrey	Rakhapura United F.C
August	(Bulgaria) Ivan Venkov Kolev	Yangon United F.C	(Brazil) Cezar Augusto	Yangon United F.C
