= Ivan Kolev (footballer, born 1957) =

Bulgarian footballer and manager

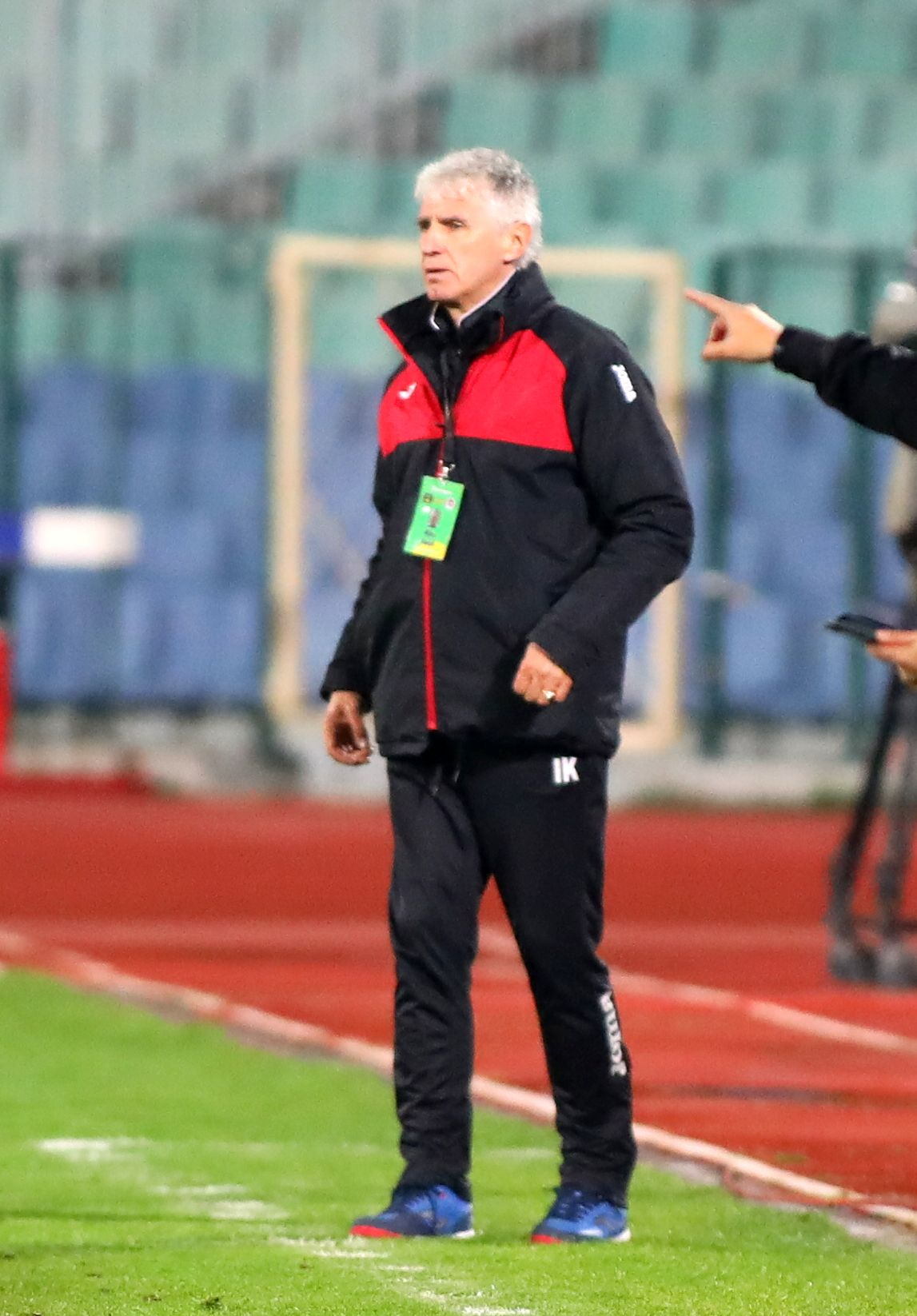
- Kolev with Lokomotiv Sofia in 2021

Personal information
- Full name: Ivan Venkov Kolev
- Date of birth: 14 July 1957 (age 69)
- Place of birth: Sofia, Bulgaria
- Position: Midfielder

Senior career*
Years	Team	Apps	(Gls)
1967–1973	Lokomotiv Sofia	87	(10)
1973–1976	Sliven	35	(3)
1976–1978	Akademik Sofia	25	(5)
1978–1979	CSKA Sofia	18	(2)
Total		165	(20)

Managerial career
- 1987–1992: Iskar
- 1993–1994: Slavia Sofia
- 1995–1996: Dunav Ruse
- 1996–1997: Kremikovtsi
- 1998–1999: Bulgaria U19
- 1999–2000: Persija Jakarta
- 2000–2002: Bulgaria U21
- 2002–2004: Indonesia
- 2004–2005: Myanmar
- 2005–2006: Mitra Kukar
- 2006–2007: Persipura Jayapura
- 2007: Indonesia
- 2008–2009: Bulgaria U21
- 2010–2011: Sriwijaya
- 2012–2013: Yangon United
- 2014–2015: Slavia Sofia
- 2016–2017: Lokomotiv Gorna Oryahovitsa
- 2017: PS TNI
- 2018: Vereya
- 2019: Persija Jakarta
- 2020–2022: Lokomotiv Sofia
- 2023: Slavia Sofia
- 2024: Lokomotiv Sofia
- 2025–2026: Chernomorets Burgas
Medal record
Men's football
Representing Indonesia (as manager)
AFF Championship
Runner-up	2002
- * Club domestic league appearances and goals

Ivan Venkov Kolev (Bulgarian: Иван Венков Колев; born 14 July 1957) is a Bulgarian football manager and former player.

== Managerial career ==
=== Indonesia ===
Kolev coached several Indonesian clubs such as Persija Jakarta, Mitra Kukar, and Persipura Jayapura.

=== Indonesia national team ===
Kolev was the coach of the Indonesia national team for the 2007 Asian Cup. Having won 2–1 against Bahrain in their opening Group D match, Indonesia were defeated 1–2 by Saudi Arabia, before losing again in the final group stage match against South Korea, 1–0.

=== Yangon United ===
Between 2012 and 2013, Kolev coached Yangon United.

=== Lokomotiv Sofia ===
In June 2020, Kolev was announced as the manager of Lokomotiv Sofia on a one-year contract.

== Managerial statistics ==
As of 7 October 2023

Managerial record by team and tenure
Team	From	To	Record							
Team	From	To	G	W	D	L	GF	GA	GD	Win %
Indonesia	1 June 2007	31 December 2007	4	2	0	2	5	5	+0	50.00
Bulgaria U-21	1 January 2008	31 December 2009	10	3	2	5	12	16	−4	30.00
Sriwijaya	1 July 2010	30 June 2011	2	1	0	1	7	10	−3	50.00
Slafia Sofia	2 September 2014	30 November 2015	46	18	10	18	53	49	+4	39.13
Lokomotiv Gorna	29 September 2016	30 April 2017	15	4	6	5	13	16	−3	26.67
PS TNI	5 May 2017	21 September 2017	21	6	3	12	26	39	−13	28.57
Vereya	1 July 2018	15 August 2018	4	0	1	3	0	6	−6	0.00
Persija	7 January 2019	3 June 2019	19	7	4	8	36	27	+9	36.84
Lokomotiv Sofia	27 May 2020	21 May 2022	64	28	15	21	93	78	+15	43.75
Slafia Sofia	19 September 2023	Present	4	1	1	2	2	5	−3	25.00
Career total			189	70	42	77	247	251	−4	37.04

== Honours ==
=== Manager ===
Indonesia

- AFF Championship runner-up: 2002

Myanmar

- AFF Championship fourth place: 2004

Sriwijaya

- Indonesian Community Shield: 2010
- Inter Island Cup: 2010

Yangon United

- Myanmar National League: 2012, 2013
