= Edison Fonseca =

Colombian footballer (born 1984)

Personal information
- Full name: John Edison Fonseca Pulgarín
- Date of birth: 25 February 1984 (age 42)
- Place of birth: Cartago, Colombia
- Height: 1.75 m (5 ft 9 in)
- Position: Forward

Senior career*
| Years | Team | Apps | (Gls) |
| 2001–2004 | Deportivo Pereira | 19 | (12) |
| 2005 | Envigado | 18 | (11) |
| 2005 | Atlético Nacional | 9 | (5) |
| 2006 | Deportes Tolima | 24 | (9) |
| 2006 | Alianza | 0 | (0) |
| 2007–2008 | Cobresal | 21 | (11) |
| 2008–2009 | Cúcuta Deportivo | 8 | (10) |
| 2009–2010 | Pelita Jaya | 7 | (3) |
| 2010–2011 | Mes Rafsanjan | 26 | (15) |
| 2011–2013 | Navibank Saigon | 18 | (9) |
| 2014–2015 | Yadanarbon | 19 | (21) |
| 2015–2016 | Ayeyawady United | 13 | (4) |
| Total | | 182 | (110) |

International career
| 2003–2006 | Colombia U-20 | 14 | (6) |
- * Club domestic league appearances and goals

Edison Fonseca (born 25 February 1984) is a Colombian former footballer. He has played in 14 matches for the Colombian U-20 national team, scoring six goals.

== Career ==
Fonseca has played for Deportivo Pereira, Envigado, Atlético Nacional, Deportes Tolima, Cobresal, Cúcuta Deportivo, and Pelita Jaya in the Indonesia Super League.

Fonseca signed to play for Iranian club Mes Rafsanjan F.C. in September 2010 but barely six months later returned to Colombia, negating his contract with Mes Rafsanjan on January 28, 2011. His contract with Mes Rafsanjan was terminated due to just cause. The case has been reviewed and approved by FIFA.

In December 2011, he moved to Vietnam and signed a contract with Navibank Saigon F.C. He also included in Navibank Saigon F.C. squads for 2011-2012 Vietnamese Super Cup on December 17, 2011. He was the joint second top scorer for Navibank in the 2012 AFC Cup with 8 goals.
