= Assalé Molo Hilaire =

Ivorian footballer

Assalé Hilaire
Personal information
- Full name: Assalé Molo Hilaire
- Place of birth: Ivory Coast
- Position: Striker

Youth career
- EFAT

Senior career*
Years	Team	Apps	(Gls)
2004–2006	AS Denguélé		
2006–2007	Al Swihli		
2007–2008	Libyan club		
2008–2009	Stade Malien de Bamako		
2009–2010	Sabé Sports de Bouna		
2010–2011	Yadanarbon FC		
2012–20xx	Manaw Myay FC		
- * Club domestic league appearances and goals

Assalé Molo Hilaire is an Ivorian former professional footballer who is last known to have been under contract to Manaw Myay of the Myanmar National League.

== Early life ==
Influenced by Brazilian footballer Ronaldo and Ivorian Aruna Dindane after watching them play, Hilaire started football aged 7 and aimed to turn professional despite no support from his father.

== Myanmar ==
After beginning with the Myanmar National League's Yadanarbon in 2010-11, Hilaire switched to Manaw Myay in 2012, bagging 15 goals and finishing as 5th on the scoring charts that season. Extending his contract for another year, the Ivorian forward targeted the top-scorer award for 2013, bagging 13 goals by early July that year.
