= Kyaw Zayar Win =

Burmese footballer

Personal information
- Full name: Kyaw Zayar Win
- Date of birth: 2 May 1991 (age 35)
- Place of birth: Yangon, Myanmar
- Height: 1.70 m (5 ft 7 in)
- Position: Winger

Senior career*
Years	Team	Apps	(Gls)
2010–2013	Kanbawza	88	(21)
2013–2014	→ Perak (loan)	11	(3)
2014–2015	Kanbawza	27	(7)
2016	Ayeyawady United	21	(4)
2017	Balestier Khalsa	18	(0)
Total		165	(35)

International career^{‡}
2011–2013	Myanmar U-23	15	(10)
2011–2015	Myanmar	22	(5)
- * Club domestic league appearances and goals as of 20 September 2017 ‡ National team caps and goals as of 27 January 2017

Kyaw Zayar Win (Burmese: ကျော်ဇေယျာဝင်း; born 2 May 1991) is a former Burmese footballer who played as a winger.

== Club career ==
=== Perak ===
Zayar Win started his career at Kanbawza (now Shan United) in the Myanmar National League before transferring to Malaysia Super League side Perak in November 2013 on a 1-year loan deal. However, an injury forced him out in April 2014.

=== Balestier Khalsa ===
After three years at Kanbawza and Ayeyawady United, Zayar Win went to Singapore to sign for Balestier Khalsa in February 2017, filling up the club's last foreign signing slot and joining his compatriots Nanda Lin Kyaw Chit and Aung Kyaw Naing, who had signed for the club days before him. He made his debut for the Tigers in a league match against Warriors FC on 28 February 2017. Although he won a penalty that led to the club's first goal, they eventually lost.

== International career ==
Zayar Win represented Myanmar at the 2011 and 2013 Southeast Asian Games. At the latter edition on home soil, as captain and the only player in the Myanmar squad to play overseas, he scored in a 3–1 win against Timor-Leste from a free kick.

=== International goals ===
Scores and results list Myanmar's goal tally first.

Goal	Date	Venue	Opponent	Score	Result	Competition
1.	2 March 2013	Thuwunna Stadium, Yangon, Myanmar	Guam	5–0	5–0	2014 AFC Challenge Cup qualification
2.	3 September 2014	Rizal Memorial Stadium, Manila, Philippines	Palestine	1–0	4–1	Friendly
3.	3 September 2014	Rizal Memorial Stadium, Manila, Philippines	Palestine	3–0	4–1	Friendly
4.	26 November 2014	National Stadium, Kallang, Singapore	Singapore	1–3	2–4	2014 AFF Championship
5.	11 June 2015	New Laos National Stadium, Vientiane, Laos	Laos	2–2	2–2	2018 FIFA World Cup qualification
