= Saša Ranković =

Serbian footballer (born 1979)

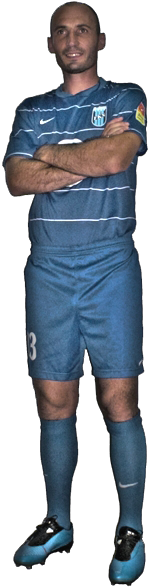
- Ranković with Smederevo

Personal information
- Full name: Saša Ranković
- Date of birth: 21 September 1979 (age 47)
- Place of birth: Požarevac, SFR Yugoslavia
- Height: 1.80 m (5 ft 11 in)
- Position: Striker

Senior career*
| Years | Team | Apps | (Gls) |
| 2001–2005 | Proleter Zrenjanin | 49 | (20) |
| 2003–2004 | → Đerdap (loan) | | |
| 2005–2009 | Mladi Radnik | 102 | (38) |
| 2009–2010 | Smederevo | 42 | (10) |
| 2011 | Southern Myanmar | | |
| 2012–2013 | Zeyar Shwe Myay | 48 | (29) |
| 2013 | Smederevo | 11 | (3) |
| 2014 | Ayeyawady United | 22 | (11) |
| Total | | 274 | (111) |

Managerial career
- RSK Rabrovo
- 2021–2023: Sloga 33
- 2023–: Mladi Radnik
- * Club domestic league appearances and goals

Saša Ranković (Serbian Cyrillic: Саша Ранковић; born 21 September 1979) is a Serbian former professional footballer who played as a striker.

While playing for Zeyar Shwe Myay, Ranković was the Myanmar National League top scorer with 20 goals in the 2012.

== Honours ==
=== Individual ===
- Myanmar National League Top Scorer: 2012
