= Michele Di Piedi =

Italian professional footballer

Personal information
- Date of birth: 21 December 1980 (age 45)
- Place of birth: Palermo, Italy
- Height: 1.98 m (6 ft 6 in)
- Position: Striker

Team information
- Current team: Europa (manager)

Youth career
- ?–1997: Panormus
- 1999: Fiorentina

Senior career*
| Years | Team | Apps | (Gls) |
| 1997–1999 | Siracusa | | |
| 1999–2000 | Perugia | 0 | (0) |
| 2000–2003 | Sheffield Wednesday | 39 | (5) |
| 2002 | → Odd Grenland (loan) | 4 | (0) |
| 2003 | → Bristol Rovers (loan) | 5 | (0) |
| 2004 | Sora | 3 | (0) |
| 2004–2005 | APOEL | 5 | (2) |
| 2005–2006 | Gela | 9 | (0) |
| 2006–2007 | Doncaster Rovers | 3 | (0) |
| 2007–2009 | Nuorese | 34 | (11) |
| 2009–2010 | Castrovillari | | |
| 2010 | Vigor Lamezia | | |
| 2010 | Mazara | | (4) |
| 2012 | FK Tauras Tauragė | 7 | (0) |
| 2014–2015 | Nay Pyi Taw F.C. | 7 | (9) |
| 2015–2016 | Metropolitanos | | |
| 2016–2017 | Mons Calpe | 18 | (7) |
| 2017–2018 | Atlético dos Arcos | 7 | (0) |
| 2018–2019 | Paceco 1976 | | |
| 2019 | Mons Calpe | 1 | (0) |
| 2019–2021 | Glacis United | 14 | (1) |

Managerial career
- 2019–2020: Glacis United (player-manager)
- 2021–2023: Glacis United
- 2024–: Europa
- * Club domestic league appearances and goals as of 25 February 2021

Michele Di Piedi (born 21 December 1980) is an Italian professional football former player and manager.

== Biography ==
=== Early career and Sheffield Wednesday (1997–2003) ===
Di Piedi was born in Palermo, Sicily, and began his career at U.S. Siracusa before signing for Perugia in 1999. However, he made no league appearances in his only season at the club. In summer 2000, he moved to Sheffield Wednesday, as Paul Jewell's first acquisition for the South Yorkshire club after their relegation from the Premier League the previous season. Di Piedi made his debut for Wednesday in their first game since relegation from The Premiership against Wolverhampton Wanderers at The Molineux on 13 August 2000, at the age of 19 as a 60th-minute substitute for Gilles De Bilde, with Andy Booth scoring a 79th-minute equaliser after Kevin Pressman was sent off in the first minute. Di Piedi was immediately welcomed by the Wednesday fans who saw echoes of recent Italian heroes; Paolo Di Canio and Benito Carbone. He showed signs he was full of energy, chasing lost causes and what he lacked in skill he made up for with his effort. His first goal for the club was a spectacular strike on his first start and was the only goal in a game away at Grimsby on 26 August. He scored some wonderful goals for The Owls, his last-minute strike at Birmingham City is well remembered by those who saw it, as he tore his shirt off, placed it on the corner flag and waved it in the air in front of the thousands of travelling Owls fans at St Andrews. His debut season was a big success with some great goals and performances which won him a four-year contract. His second season was ruined by injuries and he never fulfilled his earlier impact, although he did wow the crowds with a fantastic long-range overhead kick against Sunderland in the League Cup that saw the team progress against Premiership opposition. He scored seven goals in ten starts and thirty four substitute appearances for Wednesday.

=== Cyprus, Italy and return to England (2004–2007) ===
After spending time on loan at Norwegian side Odd Grenland in 2002 and Bristol Rovers in 2003 he was released by the club due to his child being ill and he returned to Italy to play for A.S. Sora but returned the next year for a trial at Bournemouth, after he had been recommended to them by Efan Ekoku. However, he failed to earn a permanent contract after breaking his neck in training. He then had a short spell at Cypriot side APOEL Nicosia in which he won the Cypriot Super Cup, before moving to Sicily to play for Serie C2 side Gela FC. He would again return to England in the summer of 2006, signing for Doncaster Rovers after having trials at Gillingham and Yeovil Town. Unfortunately he only made three appearances and did not score before returning to his native country again.

=== Back in Italy (2007–2010) ===
After leaving England, he returned to Italy to play at lower-level leagues, including Lega Pro Seconda Divisione with Nuorese and Serie D with Calabrians Castrovillari and Vigor Lamezia throughout the 2009–10 season. In August 2010 he was signed by Western Sicilian club Mazara on a free transfer. He left the club by mutual consent on 29 November 2010.

=== Journeyman years and Gibraltar (2012–present) ===
After several years playing across eastern Europe, Asia and South America, Di Piedi signed for newly promoted Gibraltar Premier Division team Mons Calpe in August 2016, in order to help the ambitious club challenge the top two teams of Lincoln Red Imps and Europa. Despite a mid-season spell out with injury, Di Piedi proved a crucial figure Mons Calpe's first season in the top flight of Gibraltarian football, contributing along with fellow marquee player Hugo Colace to guide them to a comfortable top half finish, after a winter dip in form during his absence saw their UEFA Europa League aspirations fade.

He then served as player-manager of Glacis United.

== Managerial career ==
In September 2019, Di Piedi was appointed player-manager of Glacis United during the abandoned 2019–20 season. He returned to the club solely as manager for the 2021–22 season and guided Glacis to a 5th place finish. A 6th place finish followed the next season, before Di Piedi left the club in summer 2023.

In January 2024 Di Piedi was appointed as manager of struggling Europa, who at the time were 10th of 11 teams in the 2023–24 Gibraltar Football League. His arrival saw an upturn in form which resulted in an 8th place finish, as well as an appearance in the 2023–24 Rock Cup final, a first cup final appearance for Di Piedi as manager.
