= Kyaw Ko Ko =

Burmese footballer

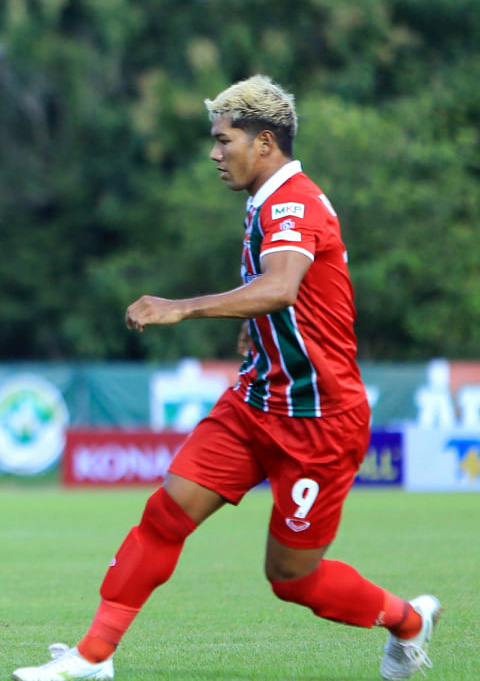
- Kyaw Ko Ko playing for Phrae United in 2021.

Personal information
- Full name: Kyaw Ko Ko
- Date of birth: 20 December 1992 (age 33)
- Place of birth: Amarapura, Myanmar
- Height: 1.74 m (5 ft 8 1/2 in)
- Position: Striker

Youth career
- 2009: Zeyar Shwe Myay

Senior career*
Years	Team	Apps	(Gls)
2010–2012	Zeyar Shwe Myay	43	(33)
2013–2019	Yangon United	139	(58)
2018	→ Chiangrai United (loan)	7	(0)
2019	→ Samut Prakan City (loan)	17	(5)
2020	Sukhothai	1	(0)
2020–2021	Chiangmai United	13	(0)
2021	Phrae United	14	(3)
2022	Rayong	15	(2)
2023	Shan United	2	(2)
2023	Phrae United	3	(0)
2024	Rakhine United	4	(9)
2024	Shan United	11	(4)
2025	Mahar United	3	(0)

International career
2009–2013	Myanmar U23	15	(8)
2010–2019	Myanmar	53	(16)
Medal record
Men's football
Representing Myanmar
Philippine Peace Cup
Gold medal – first place	2014 Philippines
- * Club domestic league appearances and goals as of 25 October 2023

Kyaw Ko Ko (Burmese: ကျော်ကိုကို; born 20 December 1992) is a Burmese professional footballer who plays as a striker for the Myanmar national team. He scored five goals in the 2011 Southeast Asian Games and helped the Myanmar U23 team to secure a third-place finish and a bronze medal. He is the star striker of Myanmar National Team. He was ranked #7 in the "World's Best Top Scorers" list by the IFFHS in 2014.

== Career ==
=== Zeyar Shwe Myay FC ===
Zeyar Shwe Myay signed Kyaw Ko Ko from Zeyar Youth team. Kyaw Ko Ko showed his talent in Zeyar Shwe Myay becoming the Myanmar National Team striker. In 2013, he moved to Yangon United with the highest transfer fee received by Zeyar Shwe Myay.

=== Yangon United ===
Kyaw Ko Ko become the main striker at Yangon United and the Myanmar national football team. He twice won the Myanmar National League and one General Aung San Shield.

=== Chiangrai United ===
In December 2017, Chiangrai United signed Kyaw Ko Ko on a 1-year loan. In a match against Pattaya United on 7 April 2018 Kyaw Ko Ko was tackled by Sarawut Kanlayanabandit and tore a ligament in his knee, ruling him out for several months and making him miss the 2018 AFF Championship.

=== Samut Prakan City ===
On 26 December 2018, Kyaw Ko Ko moved from Yangon United to Samut Prakan City on a 1-year loan deal.

=== Rakhine United ===
After 5 years played in Thai League, Kyaw Ko Ko come back to Myanmar National League.

== International ==
Appearances and goals by national team and year
National team	Year	Apps	Goals	Assists
Myanmar	2010	5	0	0
Myanmar	2011	5	0	0
Myanmar	2012	0	0	0
Myanmar	2013	1	0	0
Myanmar	2014	13	7	0
Myanmar	2015	9	1	1
Myanmar	2016	5	0	1
Myanmar	2017	8	5	1
Myanmar	2018	2	1	0
Myanmar	2019	3	2	0
Total		53	16	3

== International goals ==
Scores and results list Myanmar's goal tally first.

No.	Date	Venue	Opponent	Score	Result	Competition
1.	19 May 2014	Galolhu National Stadium, Malé	Maldives	1–0	3–2	2014 AFC Challenge Cup
2.	19 May 2014	Galolhu National Stadium, Malé	Maldives	3–1	3–2	2014 AFC Challenge Cup
3.	6 September 2014	Rizal Memorial Stadium, Manila	Philippines	1–0	3–2	2014 Philippine Peace Cup
4.	16 October 2014	New Laos National Stadium, Vientiane	Brunei	2–0	3–1	2014 AFF Championship qualification
5.	18 October 2014	New Laos National Stadium, Vientiane	Cambodia	1–0	1–0	2014 AFF Championship qualification
6.	20 October 2014	New Laos National Stadium, Vientiane	Laos	2–0	2–1	2014 AFF Championship qualification
7.	26 November 2014	National Stadium, Kallang	Singapore	2–3	2–4	2014 AFF Championship
8.	13 October 2015	Supachalasai Stadium, Bangkok	Laos	2–1	3–1	2018 FIFA World Cup qualification
9.	21 March 2017	Pakansari Stadium, Bogor	Indonesia	2–1	3–1	Friendly
10.	13 June 2017	Estádio Campo Desportivo, Taipa	Macau	2–0	4–0	2019 AFC Asian Cup qualification
11.	29 August 2017	Thuwunna Stadium, Yangon	Malaysia	1–0	1–0	Friendly
12.	10 October 2017	Thuwunna Stadium, Yangon	Kyrgyzstan	2–2	2–2	2019 AFC Asian Cup qualification
13.	14 November 2017	Fatorda Stadium, Margao	India	2–1	2–2	2019 AFC Asian Cup qualification
14.	22 March 2018	Incheon Football Stadium, Incheon	Kyrgyzstan	1–4	1–5	2019 AFC Asian Cup qualification
15.	11 June 2019	National Stadium, Kallang	Singapore	1–0	2–1	Friendly
16.	11 June 2019	National Stadium, Kallang	Singapore	2–1	2–1	Friendly

== Honours ==
Myanmar

- Philippine Peace Cup: 2014

Yangon United

- Myanmar National League: 2013, 2015

Chiangrai United

- Thailand Champions Cup: 2018

Individual

- MFF Player of the Year: 2011

== Personal life ==
Kyaw Ko Ko along with Burmese women's footballer Than Than Htwe are part of the ‘Protect the Goal’ for Burmese athletes to raise awareness in Burma on HIV/AIDS and prevention.
