= Manawmye F.C. =

Manaw Myay
- Full name: Manawmye Football Club
- Founded: 2010
- Ground: Swomprabon Stadium
- Capacity: 5,000
- Owner: U Zahkung Ying Sausaid
- League: MNL-2
- 2015: MNL-2, 11th
Home colours	Away colours

Manawmye Football Club (Burmese: မနောမြေ ဘောလုံး အသင်း; pronounced [mənɔ́mjè]; also spelled Manawmyay) was a Burmese football club based in Myitkyina. The club first competed in the 2010 season of the Myanmar National League.

== League and cup history ==
Season	Div.	Pos.	Pl.	W	D	L	GS	GA	P	Domestic Cup	Top scorer	Goals	Manager
2010	1st	9	20	6	1	13	24	50	19				
2011	1st	10	22	4	6	12	18	33	18				
2012	1st	8	26	10	6	10	32	32	36	First round	(Ivory Coast) Molo Hilaire Assalé	13	(Myanmar) Win Myint Twin
2013	1st	9	22	4	8	10	23	34	20		(Ivory Coast) Assalé	11	(Myanmar) Win Myint Twin
2014	1st	7	22	8	5	9	28	27	29	Third round			(Brazil) Emerson Alcântara
2015	1st	11	22	5	5	12	21	41	19	MFF cup			(Brazil) Emerson Alcântara
