= Emerson (footballer, born January 1986) =

Brazilian footballer

Personal information
- Full name: Emerson Reis Luiz
- Date of birth: 4 January 1986 (age 40)
- Place of birth: Guaranésia, Brazil
- Height: 1.78 m (5 ft 10 in)
- Position: Forward

Senior career*
Years	Team	Apps	(Gls)
2003–2006	Guarani		
2007	São Bernardo		
2007	Guarani		
2008	Brasilis	23	(8)
2009	Red Bull Brasil	29	(7)
2010	CRAC	13	(9)
2010–2011	Inter de Bebedouro	23	(9)
2011	Jataiense	8	(3)
2012	Inter de Bebedouro	12	(3)
2012	FAS	18	(3)
2013	Cachoeiro	10	(0)
2014–2015	Yangon United	47	(25)
2015–2016	FK Sarajevo	11	(0)
2017	Yangon United	21	(6)
2018	Vitória-ES	8	(0)
2019	Estrela do Norte	10	(1)
2020	Zwekapin United	10	(3)
2021	Yangon United	0	(0)
Total		243	(74)
- * Club domestic league appearances and goals

Emerson Reis Luiz (born 4 January 1986), known as just Emerson, is a Brazilian former professional footballer who played as a forward.

== Career ==
Emerson began his career with Guarani FC in 2003, playing for some clubs such as São Bernardo, Red Bull Brasil and Inter de Bebedouro. He began his international career in 2012 by playing for FAS and then Yangon United in 2014.

On 24 November 2015, Emerson signed a two-year contract with Bosnian Premijer liga side FK Sarajevo, before having his contract terminated by mutual consent on 23 June 2016.

== Career statistics ==
As of match played 15 May 2016

Appearances and goals by club, season and competition
Club	Season	League			National cup		Continental		Other		Total	
Club	Season	Division	Apps	Goals	Apps	Goals	Apps	Goals	Apps	Goals	Apps	Goals
FK Sarajevo	2015–16	Premijer liga BiH	9	0	2	0	–		–		11	0
Career total			9	0	2	0	0	0	0	0	11	0

== Honours ==
Red Bull Brasil

- Campeonato Paulista Segunda Divisão: 2009

Yangon United

- Myanmar National League: 2015

Vitória F.C.

- Copa Espírito Santo: 2018
