= Yangon United F.C. =

Association football club in Myanmar

Yangon United ရန်ကုန်ယူနိုက်တက်
- Full name: Yangon United Football Club
- Nickname: The Lion Warriors
- Short name: YUFC
- Founded: 2007; 19 years ago as Air Bagan; 2009; 17 years ago as Yangon United
- Ground: Yangon United Sports Complex
- Capacity: 3,500
- Owner: Tay Za
- President: Pye Phyo Tayza
- Head coach: Marcelo Cirelli
- League: Myanmar National League
- 2025–26: MNL, runners-up
Home colours	Away colours

Yangon United Football Club (Burmese: ရန်ကုန် ယူနိုက်တက် ဘောလုံးအသင်း [jàɰ̃ɡòʊɰ̃]) is a Burmese professional football club based at Yangon United Sports Complex in Yangon, Myanmar. Owned by Tay Za, a prominent Burmese businessman, it was one of eight clubs that participated in the inaugural edition of the Myanmar National League in 2009, where they finished as runners-up. The club has won a record 5 league, 3 General Aung San Shield and 3 MFF Charity Cup titles.

Yangon United's biggest rival used to be Yadanarbon, with whom they contest the Myanmar rivalry. However, due to Yadanarbon's decline, Yangon United's main rivals are Shan United, contesting the new Myanmar National League derby. Its women's section plays in the Myanmar Women League.

== History ==
=== Air Bagan FC ===
On 18 July 2007, the chairman of Htoo Group of Companies took over a first division club, Viva Football Club and changed the name to Air Bagan Football Club. Air Bagan became champion in their debut year. They then competed in the 2008 Myanmar Premier League season and finished in the top half of the table.

=== Yangon United ===
After the league was transformed to the nation's first professional football league, Air Bagan was renamed to Yangon United in 2009 and represented the seven million population in Yangon. Yangon United also formed an alliance with Thailand club BEC Tero Sasana.

On 16 May 2009, Yangon United defeated Zeya Shwe Myay 4–0 to open the MNL Cup 2009. The club finished in second place with 16 points. Yangon United lost to Yadanarbon in the final on penalty shootout after a 2–2 draw. During the 2010 season, Yangon United built an artificial turf football pitch and gymnasium.

==== Myanmar National League three-peat and AFC Cup debut (2011–2013) ====
In 2011, Yangon United won their first ever Myanmar National League title and also became the champion of the 2011 General Aung San Shield. This was the first time in Myanmar football history that a club has won both the league title and the cup. The following year, Yangon United appointed Bulgarian Ivan Kolev for the new season, in which the club to won their second consecutive Myanmar National League title and qualified for the 2013 AFC Cup.

In 2013, Yangon United signed with Grand Sport as their main kit supplier. Yangon United made their debut in the 2013 AFC Cup being placed in group F with Maldives league champions New Radiant SC, Hong Kong club Sunray Cave JC Sun Hei and Indonesian cup winners Persibo Bojonegoro. The Lions put up a fiery display in the tournament, winning five games and only losing once, thus finishing the group stage as runners-up, through to the Round of 16 for the first time in the club history. Yangon United then travelled to India to face East Bengal on 15 May 2013 at their home ground, Salt Lake Stadium, which saw the club losing 5–1, and thus exiting the tournament. However Ivan Kolev guided the club to retain their league title, third consecutive Myanmar National League title.

== 2014 ==
Yangon United again qualified for the 2014 AFC Cup where they faced Vietnamese cup winners, Vissai Ninh Bình, Hong Kong league champions South China and Malaysian club Kelantan. The club finished as group runners-up, winning 3 times and losing 3 games, in which the club qualified for the Round of 16 tie against Indonesian club Persipura Jayapura. They suffered their heaviest defeat in their history, losing 9–2 at the Mandala Stadium.

The 2014 season saw the club finishing 2nd in the league. However, the club managed to get hold of the league title in the 2015 season, winning their fourth league title, and qualified to the 2016 AFC Champions League qualifying play-off. They faced Thailand club Chonburi, losing 3–2.

== 2018-2019 ==
In 2018, Yangon United won their fifth league title with 1 point ahead of league rivals Shan United. The club qualified for the 2019 AFC Champions League qualifying play-offs, facing Philippines club Ceres–Negros. The Lions won the match 2–1, progressing on to the next stage to face Thailand's Chiangrai United. Losing 3–1 in the process, they were dropped to the 2019 AFC Cup.

Yangon United would go on and dominate until 2019, when they gave up the trophy to Shan United. Yangon United ended up with an unconvincing 2020 Myanmar National League finish at 4th place. They also participated in the 2020 AFC Cup, getting a 2–2 draw against Vietnamese side Hồ Chí Minh City. In the next match against Laotian side Lao Toyota, Yangon United went on to collect their first three points in a 3–2 win. In their third fixture against Singaporean side Hougang United, Than Paing broke the deadlock, scoring the only goal in the match. However, the AFC Cup got cancelled throughout the season due to the COVID-19 pandemic.

== 2022 ==
In the 2022 Myanmar National League season they finished second, behind Shan United. Their top scorer was Valci Júnior with 8 goals.

== 2023 ==
Yangon United founded Yangon United W.F.C. to compete in the Myanmar Women League.

== Kits and sponsors ==
Period	Kit manufacturer	Title sponsor
2009–2012	(Thailand) FBT	Air Bagan
2013–2021	(Thailand) Grand Sport	FNI insurance
2023	(Myanmar) M21	AGD Bank
2024–	(Myanmar) Glory Sport	AGD Bank

== Stadium ==
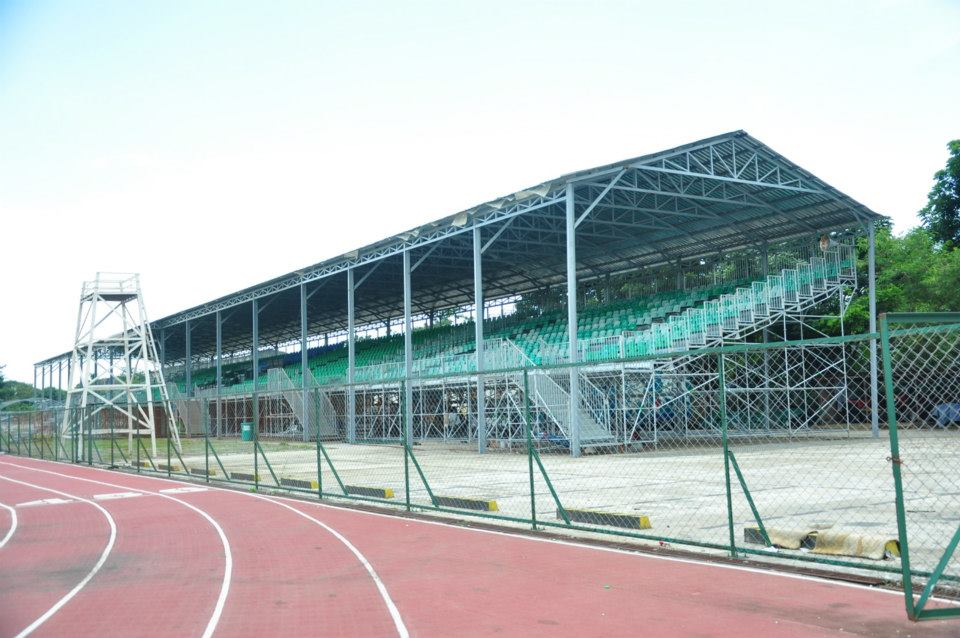

== Squad-list ==
As of September 2026

Note: Flags indicate national team as defined under FIFA eligibility rules; some limited exceptions apply. Players may hold more than one non-FIFA nationality.

No.	Pos.	Nation	Player
1	GK	MYA	Zin Nyi Nyi Aung
2	DF	MYA	Hein Zeyar Lin
3	DF	BRA	Thiago Tomas
4	DF	MYA	David Htan (captain)
5	DF	MYA	Kyaw Phyo Wai
6	MF	MYA	Arkar Kyaw
7	MF	MYA	Maung Maung Lwin
8	MF	JPN	Aoto Saito
9	FW	MYA	Than Paing
11	FW	MYA	Oakkar Naing
12	MF	LBR	Robert Korbah
13	GK	MYA	Thura Kyaw
16	MF	MYA	Aung Myo Khant
17	MF	CMR	Guy Michel
18	GK	MYA	Han Naing Soe

No.	Pos.	Nation	Player
19	FW	CMR	Moustapha Djidjiwa
22	DF	MYA	Min Kyaw Khant
23	DF	MYA	Hein Phyo Win
26	DF	MYA	Thu Rein Soe
28	MF	MYA	Thar Yar Win Htet
34	FW	MYA	Chit Aye
42	DF	MYA	Hlwan Htet Htun
44	DF	MYA	Latt Wai Phone
47	DF	MYA	Kaung Htet Paing
50	DF	LBR	Theo Nimely
71	MF	MYA	Myo Sett Paing
75	GK	MYA	San Set Naing
79	MF	MYA	Zaw Win Thein
90	FW	MYA	Pyae Moe

== Coaching staff ==
As of 29 April 2025

Position	Staff
Head coach	(Argentina) Marcelo Cirelli
Assistant coach	(Myanmar) Myo Hlaing Oo (Myanmar) Kyaw Soe Oo (Myanmar) Khin Maung Lwin
Goalkeeping coach	(Myanmar) Aung Kyaw Kyaw
Fitness coach	(Myanmar) U Than Wai
Team Officer	(Myanmar) Yan Aung Kyaw

== Player records ==
Lists of the players with the most caps and top goalscorers for the club in the league games (players in bold signifies current Yangon United F.C. player).

As of 11 July 2026

Top seven goalscorers in league games
Player		Period	Goals	Ratio	Caps
1	(Brazil) Cézar	2012–2015, 2017	118	1.06	111
2	(Myanmar) Kyaw Ko Ko	2013–2019	58	0.42	139
3	(Guinea) Sylla Sekou	2018–2019, 2023	57	0.79	72
4	(Nigeria) Charles Obi	2010–2011	31	1.11	28
5	(Myanmar) **Maung Maung Lwin**	2017–2021,2025–	32	0.39	82
6	(Brazil) Emerson	2014–2015, 2017, 2021	31	0.46	68
7	(Nigeria) Emmanuel Uzochukwu	2017–2018, 2020–2021	20	0.61	33

Top twelve league appearances
Player		Period	Caps	Goals
1	(Myanmar) **David Htan**	2009–2018, 2022–	285	8
2	(Myanmar) Yan Aung Kyaw	2009–2020	246	3
3	(Myanmar) Kyi Lin	2009–2019, 2020	178	15
4	(Myanmar) Khin Maung Lwin	2009–2015	154	5
5	(Myanmar) Kyaw Ko Ko	2013–2019	139	58
6	(Myanmar) Zaw Min Tun	2015–2017, 2018	133	7
7	(Myanmar) Myo Min Tun	2009–2013	121	0
8	(Brazil) Cézar	2012–2015, 2017	111	118
9	(Myanmar) Aung Aung Oo	2009–2013	110	0
10	(Myanmar) Kyaw Zin Htet	2017–2020	87	0
11	(Myanmar) **San Set Naing**	2017–	84	0
12	(Ivory Coast) Kekere Moukailou	2017–2019	75	6

== Continental record ==
All results (home and away) list Yangon United's goal tally first.

Season	Competition	Round	Club	Home	Away	Aggregate
2012	AFC Cup	Group G	(Thailand) Chonburi	1–1	0–1	4th
2012	AFC Cup	Group G	(Hong Kong) Citizen AA	1–2	1–2	4th
2012	AFC Cup	Group G	(Singapore) Home United	0–0	1–3	4th
2013	AFC Cup	Group F	(Maldives) New Radiant	2–0	1–3	2nd
2013	AFC Cup	Group F	(Hong Kong) Sun Hei	2–0	3–1	2nd
2013	AFC Cup	Group F	(Indonesia) Persibo Bojonegoro	3–0	7–1	2nd
2013	AFC Cup	Round of 16	(India) East Bengal	1–5		
2014	AFC Cup	Group G	(Vietnam) Vissai Ninh Bình	1–4	2–3	2nd
2014	AFC Cup	Group G	(Hong Kong) South China	2–0	3–5	2nd
2014	AFC Cup	Group G	(Malaysia) Kelantan	5–3	3–2	2nd
2014	AFC Cup	Round of 16	(Indonesia) Persipura Jayapura	2–9		
2015	Mekong Club Championship	First round	(Laos) Lao Toyota	5–2	—N/a	2nd
2015	Mekong Club Championship	First round	(Cambodia) Boeung Ket Angkor	—N/a	0–3	2nd
2016	AFC Champions League	Preliminary round 2	(Thailand) Chonburi	2–3 (a.e.t.)		
2016	AFC Cup	Group G	(Hong Kong) South China	2–1	1–2	3rd
2016	AFC Cup	Group G	(Maldives) Maziya	3–2	1–1	3rd
2016	AFC Cup	Group G	(India) Mohun Bagan	1–1	2–3	3rd
2018	AFC Cup	Group G	(Indonesia) Bali United	3–2	3–1	1st
2018	AFC Cup	Group G	(Vietnam) FLC Thanh Hóa	2–1	3–3	1st
2018	AFC Cup	Group G	(Philippines) Global Cebu	3–0	1–2	1st
2018	AFC Cup	Zonal semi-finals	(Philippines) Ceres–Negros	3–2	2–4	5–6
2019	AFC Champions League	Preliminary round 1	(Philippines) Ceres–Negros	2–1		
2019	AFC Champions League	Preliminary round 2	(Thailand) Chiangrai United	1–3		
2019	AFC Cup	Group F	(Singapore) Tampines Rovers	1–3	3–4	3rd
2019	AFC Cup	Group F	(Cambodia) Nagaworld	2–0	1–2	3rd
2019	AFC Cup	Group F	(Vietnam) Hà Nội	2–5	1–0	3rd
2020	AFC Cup	Play-off round	(Brunei) Indera	3–1	6–1	9–2
2020	AFC Cup	Group F	(Vietnam) Hồ Chí Minh City	2–2	n/p	2nd
2020	AFC Cup	Group F	(Laos) Lao Toyota	3–2	n/p	2nd
2020	AFC Cup	Group F	(Singapore) Hougang United	1–0	n/p	2nd
2023–24	AFC Cup	Preliminary round 2	(Brunei) DPMM	2–1		
2023–24	AFC Cup	Play-off round	(Indonesia) PSM Makassar	0–4		
2025–26	AFC Challenge League	Play-off round	(Laos) Ezra	1–1 (a.e.t.) (3–5 p)		
2026–27	AFC Challenge League	Play-off round	(Laos) Ezra	2–1		
2026–27	AFC Challenge League	Group D	(Indonesia) Borneo	0–2		3rd
2026–27	AFC Challenge League	Group D	(Chinese Taipei) Tainan City	1–1		3rd

== Seasons statistics ==
=== Domestic ===
Season	League									League Cup	Top goalscorer		Coach
Season	Div.	Pos.	Pl.	W	D	L	GS	GA	P	League Cup	Name	Goals	Coach
2009–10	1st	4	14	7	2	5	24	16	23				
2010	1st	3	20	11	6	3	44	12	39				
2011	1st	1	22	17	3	2	50	15	54	Winners			
2012	1st	1	26	18	5	3	64	25	60	Semi-finals	(Brazil) Cézar	15	(Bulgaria) Ivan Kolev
2013	1st	1	22	15	4	3	42	20	49	Cancelled	(Brazil) Cézar	20	(Bulgaria) Ivan Kolev
2014	1st	2	22	14	4	3	60	22	46	Quarter-finals	(Brazil) Cézar	26	(Australia) Eric Williams
2015	1st	1	22	17	3	2	62	28	54	2nd round	(Brazil) Cézar	28	(Myanmar) Tin Maung Tun
2016	1st	2	22	12	4	6	43	25	40	Runners-up	(Myanmar) Kyaw Ko Ko	13	(Myanmar) Myo Min Tun
2017	1st	2	22	16	4	2	45	11	52	Runners-up	(Myanmar) Kyaw Ko Ko	9	(Myanmar) Myo Min Tun
2018	1st	1	22	16	3	3	54	20	51	Winners	(Guinea) Sylla Sekou	28	(Myanmar) Myo Min Tun Maung
2019	1st	3	22	12	7	3	40	15	43	Winners	(Guinea) Sylla Sekou	10	(Myanmar) Tin Maung Tun
2020	1st	4	20	11	4	3	39	18	37		(Nigeria) Emmanuel Uzochukwu & (Ghana) Ernest Barfo	8	(Myanmar) Min Tun Lin
2022	1st	2	18	12	3	3	37	8	39		(Brazil) Valci Júnior	8	(Myanmar) Min Tun Lin
2023	1st	2	22	16	3	3	57	13	51		(Guinea) Sekou Sylla (Myanmar) Yan Kyaw Htwe	11	(Germany) Gerd Zeise
2024–25	1st	2	22	15	6	1	62	20	51	Runners-up	(Myanmar) Yan Kyaw Htwe	13	(Myanmar) Kyaw Dunn
2025–26	1st	2	22	18	3	1	69	7	57	Winners	(Cameroon) Ghislain Mogou & (Myanmar) Kaung Sithu	12	(Myanmar) Tin Maung Tun (Myanmar) Zaw Linn Tun (Japan) Tetsuro Uki

== Honours ==
Yangon United – Honours
Type	Competition	Titles	Title Seasons	Runners-up	Runners-up seasons
League	Myanmar National League	5	2011, 2012, 2013, 2015, 2018	7	2014, 2016, 2017, 2022, 2023, 2024–25, 2025–26
Cup	General Aung San Shield	2	2018, 2019	2	2016, 2017
Cup	MFF Cup	1	2011	–	–
Cup	MFF Charity Cup	3	2013, 2016, 2018	3	2012, 2014, 2019
Cup	MNL League Cup	1	2025	2	2009, 2024
Youth	MNL Reserve League	2	2009, 2010	–	–
Youth	MNL U-21 Youth League	3	2012, 2014, 2015	–	–
Youth	MNL U-20 Youth League	0	–	1	2016
Youth	MNL U-19 Youth League	1	2016	0	–
International	AFC Cup	–	–	Zonal Semi-final: 1 Round of 16: 2	Zonal Semi-final: 2018; Round of 16: 2013, 2014
