= Nanda Lin Kyaw Chit =

Burmese footballer (born 1991)

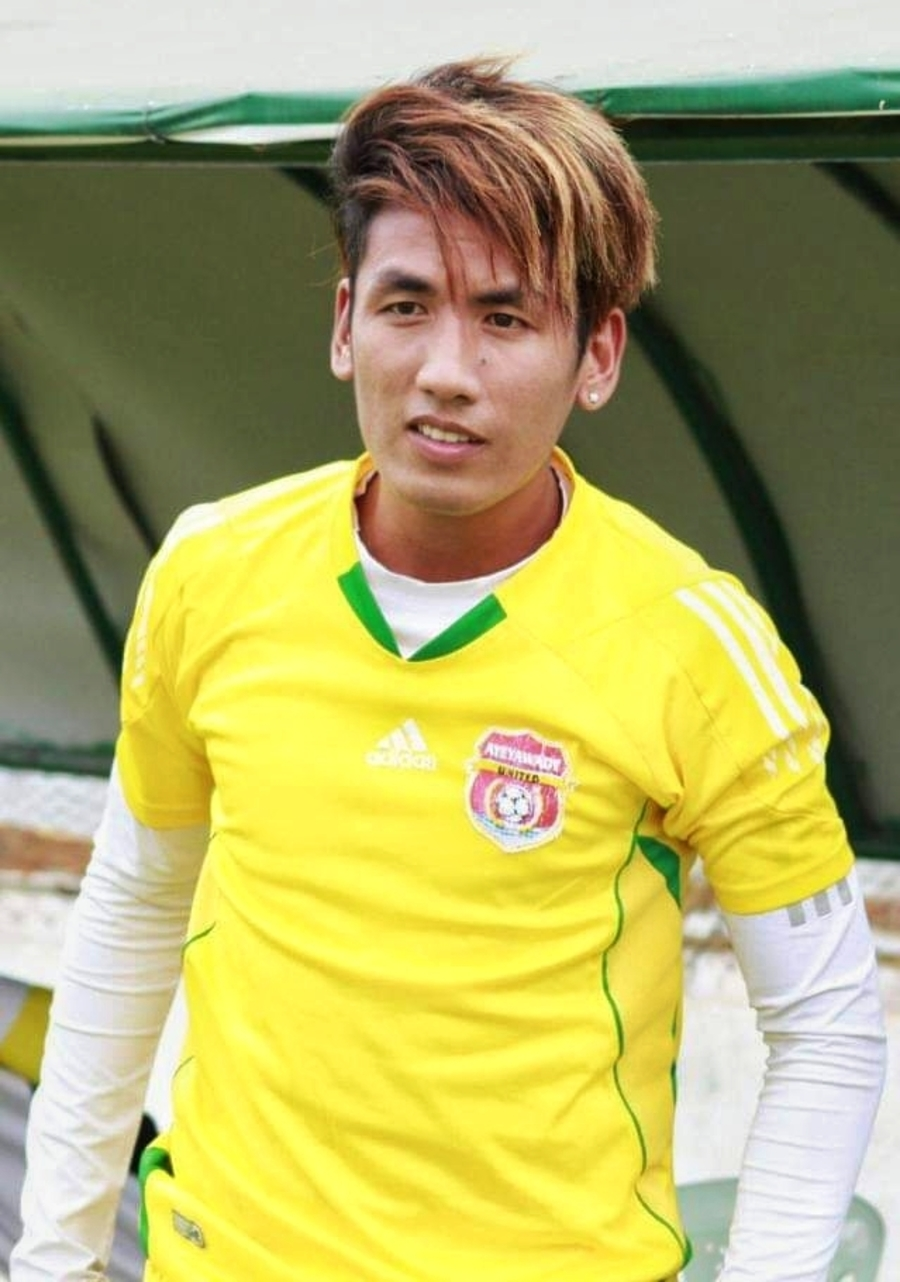

Personal information
- Full name: Nanda Lin Kyaw Chit
- Date of birth: 27 June 1991 (age 35)
- Place of birth: Yangon, Myanmar
- Height: 1.75 m (5 ft 9 in)
- Position: Winger

Team information
- Current team: Chin United
- Number: 27

Senior career*
Years	Team	Apps	(Gls)
2012–2014	Ayeyawady United	47	(14)
2015–2017	Yadanarbon	52	(4)
2017–2018	Balestier Khalsa	23	(0)
2018–2019	PT Prachuap	17	(0)
2019–2020	Ayeyawady United	11	(1)
2020	Chin United	17	(0)

International career^{‡}
2012	Myanmar U22	3	(0)
2013–2020	Myanmar	15	(2)
- * Club domestic league appearances and goals as of September 30, 2015 ‡ National team caps and goals as of May 8, 2015

Nanda Lin Kyaw Chit (Burmese: နန္ဒလင်းကျော်ချစ်; born 27 June 1991) is a Burmese professional footballer who plays as a midfielder for Chin United and Myanmar national team. He played for Myanmar U22 in 2013 AFC U-22 Asian Cup qualification. Nanda Lin Kyaw Chit won second runner-up of the 2013 MNL Best Player Award.

== Club career ==
He played for Singapore club Balestier Khalsa in 2017 season. In 2018, he decided to join Thailand premier league-1 side PT Prachuap after his contract with S-league side expired.

In 2019, he signed on as a loan for Myanmar club Ayeyawady United for the 2019 season.

== International goals ==
Scores and results list Myanmar's goal tally first.

No.	Date	Venue	Opponent	Score	Result	Competition
1.	3 September 2014	Rizal Memorial Stadium, Manila, Philippines	Palestine	4–0	4–1	2014 Philippine Peace Cup
2.	20 October 2014	New Laos National Stadium, Vientiane, Laos	Laos	1–0	2–1	2014 AFF Championship qualification
