= Paung Laung Stadium =

Football stadium Nay Pyi Taw in Myanmar

Coordinates: 19°45′05.3″N 96°12′07.1″E

- Paung Laung Stadium
- Interactive map of Paung Laung Stadium
- Full name: Paung Laung Stadium
- Location: Pyinmana, Nay Pyi Taw
- Owner: Nay Pyi Taw FC
- Capacity: 15,000
- Surface: Grass

Tenant
- Nay Pyi Taw

Paung Laung Stadium is an association football stadium at Pyinmana, Naypyidaw, Myanmar. It has a capacity of 15,000, and is the home stadium of Nay Pyi Taw F.C.
