= Chin United F.C. =

- Full name: Chin United Football Club
- Nickname: The Eagles
- Founded: 2012; 14 years ago
- Ground: Thuwunna Stadium
- Owner: Daw Tint Tint Lwin
- Manager: U Aung Khine
- League: Myanmar National League
- 2017: MNL, 11th

Chin United Football Club was a Burmese football club. The club was based in Chin State, along with GFA FC. It was composed mostly of Chin players who claimed to have faced ethnic prejudice and discrimination on the pitch.

== Honours ==
- Myanmar National League 2
  - Champions (2): 2013, 2019

== Crest and colors ==
According to the club, the eagle was chosen as it is the putative king of all the birds. The nine stars are supposed to represent the nine townships in Chin State.

== Recent seasons ==
Their first season in the 2012 Myanmar National League resulted in one victory out of 26 games. After getting relegated, they returned to the top tier in 2014, finishing tenth out of 12 teams.

== Individual records ==
As of 16 October 2023

Top league goalscorer
Player		Period	Goals	Ratio	Caps
1	(Liberia) Keith Martu Nah	2013–2014	43	0.65	66
