= Monywa Stadium =

Multi-purpose stadium in Monywa, Myanmar

Coordinates: 22°07′11″N 95°07′40″E

- Monywa Stadium
- Interactive map of Monywa Stadium
- Full name: Monywa Stadium
- Location: Monywa, Burma
- Capacity: 5,000

Tenant
- Sagaing United F.C.

Monywa Stadium (Burmese: မုံရွာ အားကစားကွင်း) is a multi-use stadium in Monywa, Myanmar. It is currently used mostly for football matches and is the home ground of Sagaing United F.C. of the Myanmar National League. The stadium has a capacity of 5,000 spectators.
