= Zeyar Shwe Myay F.C. =

Zeyar Shwe Myay
- Full name: Zeyar Shwe Myay Football Club
- Nickname: The Dragons
- Founded: 2009; 17 years ago
- Ground: Monywa Stadium
- Capacity: 6,000
- Owner: U Thu Rain

Zeyar Shwe Myay Football Club (Burmese: ဇေယျာရွှေမြေ ဘောလုံးအသင်း; pronounced [zèjà ʃwè mjè]) is a Burmese professional football club, based at Monywa Stadium in Monywa, Myanmar. The club was a founding member of the Myanmar National League (MNL) in 2009. The club represents the Sagaing Division in central Myanmar.

== Players (2016) ==
Note: Flags indicate national team as defined under FIFA eligibility rules; some limited exceptions apply. Players may hold more than one non-FIFA nationality.

No.	Pos.	Nation	Player
1	GK	MYA	Zaw Zaw Naing
3	DF	MYA	Shwe Hlaing Win
4	DF	MYA	Aung Hein Soe Oo
5	DF	MYA	Phyo Paing Soe
6	MF	MYA	Aung Ko Ko Win
7	MF	MYA	Nan Min Aung
8	MF	MYA	Zaw Lin Htet
9	FW	MYA	Naing Oo Lwin
11	FW	BRA	Marcio Gomes
12	GK	MYA	Phyo Min Maung
15	MF	MYA	Myo Min Zaw

No.	Pos.	Nation	Player
16	DF	MYA	Wai Phyo Lwin
18	GK	MYA	Aung Kyaw Kyaw
19	MF	MYA	Aung Thu Phyo
20	FW	MYA	Ye' Htet Aung
24	MF	MYA	Myo Wai Lin
28	MF	GHA	Abubakar Yakubu
29	DF	MYA	Win Zin Oo
31	MF	MYA	Naing Soe Wai
34	DF	MYA	Nay Myo Aung
44	DF	NGA	Ibrahim

=== Notable former players ===
- Abubakar Yakubu

== Individual records ==
Lists of the players with the most caps and top goalscorers for the club in the league games (players in bold signifies current Zeyar Shwe Myay F.C. player).

As of 16 October 2023

Top Three Highest Goalscorers in the league games
Player		Period	Goals	Ratio	Caps
1	(Myanmar) Kyaw Ko Ko	2010–2012	33	0.71	42
2	(Ivory Coast) Donald Bissa	2016	30	1.36	22
3	(Serbia) Saša Ranković	2012–2013	29	0.6	48
