= 2016 Myanmar National League =

Myanmar National League
- Season: 2016
- Champions: Yadanarbon
- Runner up: Yangon United
- Relegated: Horizon; Southern Myanmar
- Champion League: Yadanarbon
- AFC Cup: Magwe
- Matches: 132
- Goals: 328 (2.48 per match)
- Top goalscorer: (Liberia) Keith Martu Nah (Myanmar) Win Naing Soe (Nigeria) Christopher Chizoba (16 goals)
- Best goalkeeper: Thiha Sithu (10 clean sheets)
- Biggest home win: Shan United 5–0 Horizon (4 March 2016) Zeyar Shwe Myay 5–0 Chin United (12 June 2016)
- Biggest away win: Southern Myanmar 0–5 Shan United (17 January 2016)
- Highest scoring: Ayeyawady United 3–5 Yadanarbon (21 May 2016); Yangon United 6–2 Horizon (9 July 2016); Horizon 2–6 Ayeyawady United (16 Junly 2016)
- Longest unbeaten run: Yadanarbon (17 Matches)
- Longest winless run: Southern Myanmar (11 Matches)
- Longest losing run: Southern Myanmar (5 Matches)

The 2016 Myanmar National League, also known as the 2016 Ooredoo Myanmar National League, was the 7th season of the Myanmar National League, the top Burmese professional league for association football clubs since its founding in 2009.The transfer period for the 2016 season was from 1 November 2015 to 8 January 2016.

Yangon United began the season as defending champions of the 2015 Myanmar National League. Southern Myanmar and Horizon entered as the two promoted teams from the 2015 Myanmar National League 2. Horizon FC was promoted to the MNL for the first time.

The first half of the 2016 Ooredoo MNL was completely finished on 4 April, and the second half started on May 21. The half-season transfer window was opened from April 18 to May 17. After Week 12, the remaining matches were suspended for three weeks because of the Myanmar national football team's participation in the 2016 AYA Bank Cup. The matches resumed on 11 June from Week 13.

== First half-season review ==
At the half-season break, Yadanarbon led the 2016 MNL Ooredoo standing table with 29 points, followed by Hanthawaddy United with 21 points. The 2015 General Aung San Shield winners Ayeyawady United stood third with 20 points. Reigning MNL champions Yangon United only earned 19 points and grabbed the fourth place.

== Events ==
This season was the second Myanmar National League season to have had Ooredoo as the title sponsor, after the MFF and the Qatar-based telecom operator signed a US$1 million-a-year sponsorship contract on 10 January 2016.

== Teams ==
A total of 12 teams competed in the 2016 season: 10 sides from the 2015 season and two promoted teams from the 2015 Myanmar National League 2.

Manaw Myay and Nay Pyi Taw were relegated to the 2016 MNL-2 since they finished the 2015 season at the lowest positions. They were replaced by the two promoted teams from the 2015 MNL-2, champions Southern Myanmar and runners-up Horizon.

=== Stadiums ===
Club	Home City	Stadium	Capacity
Ayeyawady United	Pathein	Ayar Stadium	6,000
Chin United	Hakha	Wammathu Maung Stadium*	4,000
Hanthawaddy United	Bago	Taungoo Stadium	4,000
Horizon	Yangon	Horizon Stadium*	-
Magwe	Magway	Magway Stadium*	3,000
Rakhine United	Sittwe	Weithali Stadium*	5,000
Shan United	Taunggyi	Taunggyi Stadium	7,000
Southern Myanmar	Mawlamyaing	Ramanya Stadium*	15,000
Yadanarbon	Mandalay	Bahtoo Stadium	17,000
Yangon United	Yangon	Yangon United Sports Complex	3,500
Zeyar Shwe Myay	Monywa	Monywa Stadium	5,000
Zwegapin United	Hpa-An	Hpa-An Stadium*	3,000

(*) – not ready to play. MNL clubs that have not had their home stadia ready to host home matches currently use Aung San Stadium and Thuwunna Stadium in Yangon.

=== Name changes ===
- Kanbawza FC renamed themselves to Shan United FC

=== Personnel and sponsoring ===
Note: Flags indicate national team as has been defined under FIFA eligibility rules. Players may hold more than one non-FIFA nationality.

Team	Head coach	Captain	Kit manufacturer	Shirt sponsor
Ayeyawady United	(Myanmar) Kyaw Lwin	(Myanmar) Min Min Thu	(Thailand) Grand Sport	
Chin United	(Myanmar) Soe Thein	(Myanmar) Chit Su Moe	(Germany) Adidas	
Hanthawaddy United	(Myanmar) Ngwe Tun	(Myanmar) Aung Zaw	(Thailand) FBT	
Horizon FC	(Turkey) Erdinç Pala	(Myanmar) Nyi Nyi Tun	Cadenza	(Myanmar) Horizon Int'l School
Magway	(Myanmar) Kyi Lwin	(Myanmar) Soe Min Naing	(Thailand) Grand Sport	
Rakhine United	(Myanmar) Aung Zaw Myo	(Brazil) Andrey Coutinho	made by club	(Myanmar) Up Energy drink
Shan United	(Myanmar) Soe Myat Min	(Myanmar) Win Min Htut	(Thailand) Grand Sport	(Sweden) Scania
Southern Myanmar FC	(Myanmar) Mya Lwin	(Myanmar) Pyae Phyo Aung	(Germany) Adidas	(Myanmar) Yuzana Group
Yadanarbon	(Belgium) René Desaeyere	(Myanmar) Yan Paing	(Thailand) FBT	(Myanmar) Alpine
Yangon United	(Myanmar) Myo Min Tun	(Myanmar) Khin Maung Lwin	(Thailand) Grand Sport	(Myanmar) First National Insurance
Zeyar Shwe Myay	(Portugal) Fabiano Jose Costa Flora	(Costa Rica) Victor Coto Ortega	(Thailand) Grand Sport	
Zwegapin United	(Myanmar) Aung Min Oo	(Brazil) Edésio Sérgio Ribeiro de Oliveira (Junior)	Made by Club	(Myanmar) Htay Group

=== Managerial changes ===
Team	Outgoing manager	Manner of departure	Incoming manager
Yangon United	(Brazil) Emerson Alcântara	Sacked	(North Macedonia) Marjan Sekulovski
Shan United	(Brazil) Royter Moreira	Sacked	(Myanmar) Soe Myat Min
Yangon United	(North Macedonia) Marjan Sekulovski	Sacked	(Myanmar) Myo Min Tun

=== Foreign players ===
The number of foreign players is restricted to four per MNL club. A team can use three foreign players on the field in each game, including a slot for a player from among AFC countries.

Club	Player 1	Player 2	Player 3	AFC player
Ayeyawady United	(Ghana) Abubakari Yakubu	(Ghana) Hanson Samuel	(Nigeria) Christopher Chizoba	(Japan) Nishihara Takumu
Chin United	(Liberia) Sackie Teah Doe	(Liberia) Morris Joshua Papuchu	(Nigeria) Anderson Ebimo West	
Hanthawaddy United	(Ivory Coast) Bamba Gaoussou	(Liberia) Melvin George		
Horizon	(Liberia) Martin	(Turkey) Ernest Ekici	(Nigeria) Idoko Sunday Matthew	
Magway	(Guinea) Sekou Sylla	(Cameroon) Ronald Djam Kufoin	(Nigeria) Micheal Henry Alloysius	
Shan United	(Ivory Coast) Djawa Maximin	(Brazil) Gustavo	(England) Patrick Kanyuka	
Southern Myanmar	(Guinea) Doumbouya Ibrahima	(Nigeria) Ijezie Michael	(Nigeria) Eze Chika Philip	
Rakhine United	(Cameroon) Ndongo Philippe	(Brazil) Andrey Coutinho	(Nigeria) Atapa Kazeem Adeolu	(Australia) Brima Kamara
Yadanarbon	(Liberia) Keith Martu Nah	(Ivory Coast) Kekere Moukailou	(Cameroon) Williams	(Japan) Keisuke Ogawa
Yangon United	(Brazil) Adilson	(Brazil) Luiz Fernando	(Brazil) Marcelo Fernandes	(Japan) Kunihiro Yamashita
Zeyar Shwe Myay	(Nigeria) Ouattara Ibrahim	(Costa Rica) Víctor Coto	(Brazil) Marcinho	(Indonesia) Dedi Gusmawan
Zwekapin United	(Brazil) Junior	(Ghana) Patrick Asare	(Nigeria) Clarke Clifford	(Japan) Ken Matsumoto

== Result ==
=== League table ===
Pos	Team	Pld	W	D	L	GF	GA	GD	Pts	Qualification or relegation
1	Yadanarbon	22	17	3	2	52	12	+40	54	Mekong Club Championship and AFC Champions League preliminary round 2 or AFC Cup group stage
2	Yangon United	22	12	4	6	43	25	+18	40	
3	Magwe	22	11	6	5	32	23	+9	39	AFC Cup group stage
4	Ayeyawady United	22	10	7	5	39	29	+10	37	
5	Shan United	22	9	9	4	32	13	+19	36	
6	Zeyar Shwe Myay	21	10	6	5	29	20	+9	36	
7	Hanthawaddy United	22	8	6	8	31	32	−1	30	
8	Zwegapin United	22	8	4	10	29	26	+3	28	
9	Chin United	22	6	6	10	21	37	−16	24	
10	Rakhine United	22	3	8	11	18	29	−11	17	
11	Southern Myanmar United	22	3	5	14	14	46	−32	14	Relegation to MNL-2
12	Horizon	21	1	4	16	19	59	−40	7	Relegation to MNL-2

=== Result table ===
Home \ Away	AYA	CHU	HTU	HRZ	MAG	RUD	SUD	SMU	YAD	YGN	ZSM	ZKP
Ayeyarwady United		1–1	1–4	2–0	2–1	0–2	2–0	1–1	3–5	3–2	2–1	1–1
Chin United	2–3		1–2	2–1	0–3	2–0	0–3	0–0	0–0	1–3	1–1	0–3
Hanthawaddy United	1–1	3–2		3–0	1–4	1–0	2–3	2–3	1–3	2–1	2–0	0–0
Horizon	2–6	0–1	1–1		1–1	1–1	0–3	0–0	1–5	0–3	1–2	2–3
Magway	3–2	1–2	2–1	1–0		2–1	1–1	1–1	1–0	0–2	1–1	2–1
Rakhine United	0–0	1–1	1–1	3–0	1–1		1–1	2–1	0–2	0–0	1–2	1–2
Shan United	0–0	1–1	0–0	5–0	0–0	1–0		3–0	0–1	1–1	0–1	2–1
Southern Myanmar	0–5	0–3	0–0	3–1	0–1	3–0	0–5		0–3	0–4	0–2	1–3
Yadanarbon	2–1	5–0	3–1	3–1	3–2	2–0	1–1	5–1		3–2	2–0	1–0
Yangon United	1–1	1–0	2–1	6–2	1–2	3–1	0–2	1–0	1–2		2–2	2–0
Zeyar Shwe Myay	0–1	4–0	3–0	3–2	2–1	1–1	1–1	1–0	1–0	0–2		1–1
Zwegabin United	0–1	0–1	1–2	2–3	0–1	2–1	1–0	3–0	1–1	2–3	2–0	

Updated to match(es) played on 19 June 2016. Source:
Legend: Blue = home team win; Yellow = draw; Red = away team win.

== Matches ==
Fixtures and results of the Myanmar National League 2016 season.

=== Week 1 ===
2016-01-09	Rakhine United	2–1	Southern Myanmar	Thuwunna Stadium, Yangon
16:00 UTC+06:30	Andrey Coutinho 52', 86'		Khine Zaw Tun 45'	Referee: U Tin Naing Htwe

2016-01-09	Horizon FC	1–2	Zeyar Shwe Myay	Aung San Stadium, Yangon
16:00 UTC+06:30	Thura Min Naing 67'		Victor Coto 33'; Nan Min Aung 38'	Referee: U Aung Thu

2016-01-10	Shan United	0–0	Hanthawaddy United	Taunggyi Stadium, Shan
16:00 UTC+06:30

2016-01-10	Yangon United	1–2	Magwe	Yangon United Sports Complex, Yangon
15:30 UTC+06:30	Davit Htan 27'		Mg Mg Soe 9'; Khing Htoo 21'

2016-01-10	Yadanarbon FC	2–1	Ayeyawady United	Bahtoo Stadium, Mandalay
16:00 UTC+06:30	Win Naing Soe 72'; Hlaing Bo Bo 77'		Christopher 23'

2016-01-10	Chin United	0–3	Zwekapin United	Thuwunna Stadium, Yangon
16:00 UTC+06:30			Cliffore 33'; Aung Moe 35'; Ken 41'

=== Week 2 ===
2016-01-16	Zwekapin United	2–3	Horizon	Thuwunna Stadium, Yangon
16:00 UTC+06:30	Aung Moe 9'; Ken 90+5'		Chan Oo 12'; Myo Zaw Oo 59', 67'

2016-01-16	Chin United	0–0	Yadanarbon	Aung San Stadium, Yangon
16:00 UTC+06:30

2016-01-17	Southern Myanmar	0–5	Shan United	Aung San Stadium, Yangon
16:00 UTC+06:30			Nay Lin Tun 34'; Gustavo 47', 60'; Soe Min Oo 54' (pen.); Hein Thiha Zaw 57'

2016-01-17	Hanthawaddy United	2–1	Yangon United	Thuwunna Stadium, Yangon
16:00 UTC+06:30	Maung Maung Lwin 36'; Aung Zaw 87'		Zaw Min Tun 79'

2016-01-17	Zeyar Shwe Myay	1–1	Rakhine United	Monywa Stadium, Sagaing
15:30 UTC+06:30	Ye Htet Aung 40'		Myo Zaw Oo 29'

2016-01-18	Magway	3–2	Ayeyawady United	Aung San Stadium, Yangon
16:00 UTC+06:30	Sylla 3', 16'; Set Phyo Wai 13'		Christopher 34', 88'

=== Week 3 ===
2016-01-23	Shan United	1–1	Yangon United	Taunggyi Stadium, Shan
15:30 UTC+06:30	Sai Min Tun 83'		Kyaw Ko Ko 58'	Referee: U Khin Maung Win

2016-01-23	Ayeyawady United	1–4	Hanthawaddy United	Ayar Stadium, Ayeyawady
16:00 UTC+06:30	Christopher 82'		Bamba 2', 56'; Maung Maung Lwin 44'; Ivan Carlos 53'	Referee: U Tin Naing Htwe

2016-01-23	Horizon	1–5	Yadanarbon	Aung San Stadium, Yangon
16:00 UTC+06:30	Nyi Nyi Htun 30'		Keith Martu Nah 8', 89'; Aung Thu 15'; Ye Ko Oo 40'; Nanda Lin Kyaw Chit 80'

2016-01-23	Southern Myanmar United	0–2	Zeyar Shwe Myay	Thuwunna Stadium, Yangon
16:00 UTC+06:30			Victor Coto 2', 28'

2016-01-24	Rakhine United	1–2	Zwekapin United	Aung San Stadium, Yangon
15:30 UTC+06:30	Myo Zaw Oo 28'		Ken 42'; Aung Moe 51'	Referee: U Win Kyaw Oo

2016-01-24	Magwe	1–2	Chin United	Thuwunna Stadium, Yangon
16:00 UTC+06:30	Di Jam 79'		Chit Su Moe 8'; Morris 19' (pen.)	Referee: U Thant Zin Oo

=== Week 4 ===
2016-01-29	Ayeyawady United	3–2	Yangon United	Ayar Stadium, Pathein
15:30 UTC+06:30	Kyaw Zayar Win 40'; Christopher 66', 77'		Adilson 6', 17'	Referee: U Zaw Khine

2016-01-30	Yadanarbon	2–0	Rakhine United	Bahtoo Stadium, Mandalay
16:00 UTC+06:30	Keith Martu Nah 30'; Win Naing Soe 30'

2016-01-30	Chin United	1–2	Hanthawaddy United	Thuwunna Stadium, Yangon
16:00 UTC+06:30	Morris 5'		Kyaw Zay Ya 32'; Aung Myo Thura 90+3'

2016-01-30	Zwegabin United	3–0	Southern Myanmar United	Aung San Stadium, Yangon
16:00 UTC+06:30	Aung Moe 11'; Ken 38'; Tihomir Zivkovic 53'

2016-01-31	Zeyar Shwe Myay	0–0	Shan United	Monywa Stadium, Sagaing
15:30 UTC+06:30

2016-01-31	Horizon	1–1	Magwe	Thuwunna Stadium, Yangon
16:00 UTC+06:30	Joseph 62'		Naing Naing Kyaw 45'

=== Week 5 ===
2016-02-05	Yangon United	1–0	Chin United	Yangon United Sports Complex, Yangon
15:30 UTC+06:30	Than Paing 71'

2016-02-06	Ayeyawady United	2–0	Shan United	Ayar Stadium, Pathein
16:00 UTC+06:30	Thiha Zaw 53'; Aung Kyaw Naing 64'

2016-02-06	Southern Myanmar United	0–3	Yadanarbon United	Thuwunna Stadium, Yangon
16:00 UTC+06:30			William 9'; Keith Martu Nah 42', 59'

2016-02-07	Zeyar Shwe Myay	1–1	Zwegapin United	Monywa Stadium, Sagaing
16:00 UTC+06:30	Victor 60'		Kaung Sithu 76'

2016-02-07	Hanthawaddy United	3–0	Horizon	Thuwunna Stadium, Yangon
15:30 UTC+06:30	Naing Ye Aung 32' (O.G); Ivan 47'; Bamba 82'

2016-02-07	Rakhine United	1–1	Magwe	Aung San Stadium, Yangon
16:00 UTC+06:30	Coutinho 18'		Micheal 51'

=== Week 6 ===
2016-02-13	Rakhine United	1–1	Hanthawaddy United	Thuwunna Stadium, Yangon
16:00 UTC+06:30	Andrey Coutinho 60'		Aung Zaw 85'	Referee: U Khin Maung Win

2016-02-14	Zwegapin United	1–0	Shan United	Aung San Stadium, Yangon
16:00 UTC+06:30	Junior 45+1'

2016-02-14	Magwe	1–1	Southern Myanmar	Thuwunna Stadium, Yangon
16:00 UTC+06:30	Sylla 68'		Kyaw Zin Win 20'

2016-02-14	Yadanarbon	2–0	Zeyar Shwe Myay	Bahtoo Stadium, Mandalay
15:30 UTC+06:30	Keith Martu Nah 31'; Ye Ko Oo 38'

2016-02-15	Chin United	2–3	Ayeyawady United	Aung San Stadium, Yangon
16:00 UTC+06:30	Suam Lan Mang 45+2'; Sackie Doe 86'		Takumu 45+2'; Aung Kyaw Naing 45+2'; Min Min Thu 45+2'

2016-02-15	Horizon	0–3	Yangon United	Thuwunna Stadium, Yangon
16:00 UTC+06:30			Kyi Lin 18'; Kyaw Ko Ko 79'; Than Paing 86'

=== Week 7 ===
2016-02-20	Ayeyawady United	2–0	Horizon	Ayar Stadium, Pathein
16:00 UTC+06:30	Christipher 21'; Aung Kyaw Naing 55'

2016-02-20	Yangon United	3–1	Rakhine United	Yangon United Sports Complex, Yangon
16:00 UTC+06:30	Adilson 25'; Kyi Lin 36'; Kamara 81' (OG)		Andrey Coutinho 80'

2016-02-21	Zwekapin United	1–1	Yadanarbon	Thuwunna Stadium, Yangon
16:00 UTC+06:30	Tin Win Aung 19'		Aung Thu 80'

2016-02-21	Shan United	1–1	Chin United	Taunggyi Stadium, Shan
15:30 UTC+06:30	Aly Camara 61'		Suan Lam Mang 59'

2016-02-21	Zeyar Shwe Myay	2–1	Magwe	Monya Stadium, Sagaing
16:00 UTC+06:30	Naing Oo Lwin 39'; Yan Naing Oo 76'		Cho Tun 15'

2016-02-22	Southern Myanmar	0–0	Hanthawaddy United	Thuwunna Stadium, Yangon
16:00 UTC+06:30

=== Week 8 ===
2016-02-26	Horizon	0–1	Chin United	Thuwunna Stadium, Yangon
16:00 UTC+06:30			Ram Hlei Ceu 66'

2016-02-27	Shan United	0–1	Yadanarbon	Taunggyi Stadium, Shan
16:00 UTC+06:30			Win Naing Soe 32'	Referee: U Thant Zin Oo

2016-02-27	Hanthawaddy United	2–0	Zeyar Shwe Myay	Thuwunna Stadium, Yangon
16:00 UTC+06:30	Ivan 7'; Chit Hla Aung 77'

2016-02-27	Southern Myanmar	0–4	Yangon United	Aung San Stadium, Yangon
15:30 UTC+06:30			Marcelo 33'; Zaw Min Tun 37'; Adilson 40', 75'

2016-02-28	Magwe	2–1	Zwegabin United	Thuwunna Stadium, Yangon
16:00 UTC+06:30	Aung Thu Win 32', O.G'; Sylla 34'		Junior 88'

2016-02-28	Rakhine United	0–0	Ayeyawady United	Aung San Stadium, Yangon
16:00 UTC+06:30

=== Week 9 ===
2016-03-03	Ayeyawady United	1–1	Southern Myanmar	Ayar Stadium, Pathein
16:00 UTC+06:30	San Myo Oo 82'		Ye Aung 6'

2016-03-03	Zeyar Shwe Myay	0–2	Yangon United	Monywa Stadium, Sagaing
16:00 UTC+06:30			Marcelo 1'; Kyaw Ko Ko 33'

2016-03-04	Chin United	2–0	Rakhine United	Thuwunna Stadium, Yangon
16:00 UTC+06:30	Chit Su Moe 41'; Sakie Doe 45+3'

2016-03-04	Zwekapin United	1–2	Hanthawaddy United	Aung San Stadium, Yangon
15:30 UTC+06:30	Than Zaw Myo 53'		Ivan 15', 18'

2016-03-04	Shan United	5–0	Horizon	Taunggyi Stadium, Shan
16:00 UTC+06:30	Hein Thiha Zaw 6'; Zin Min Tun 8'; Patrick 20'; Soe Min Oo 38', 86'

2016-03-05	Yadanarbon	3–2	Magwe	Bahtoo Stadium, Mandalay
16:00 UTC+06:30	Win Naing Soe 6'; Keith Martu Nah 25'; Aung Thu 90+3'		Maung Maung Soe 15'; Htoo Htoo Aung 90+4'

=== Week 10 ===
2016-03-12	Zeyar Shwe Myay	0–1	Ayeyawady United	Monywa Stadium, Sagaing
15:30 UTC+06:30			Aung Ye Htet 55'

2016-03-12	Southern Myanmar	0–3	Chin United	Thuwunna Stadium, Yangon
16:00 UTC+06:30			Anderson West 38'; Morris 44'; Ko Ko Maung 66'

2016-03-12	Rakhine United	3–0	Horizon	Aung San Stadium, Yangon
16:00 UTC+06:30	Andrey Coutinho 9', 48'; Dway Ko Ko Chit 37'

2016-03-13	Hanthawaddy United	1–3	Yadanarbon	Aung San Stadium, Yangon
16:00 UTC+06:30	Bamba 34'		Aung Thu 22'; Keith Martu Nah 26', 32'

2016-03-13	Magwe	1–1	Shan United	Thuwunna Stadium, Yangon
16:00 UTC+06:30	Ko Ko Naing (41)		Zin Min Tun (81)

2016-04-07	Yangon United	2–0	Zwekapin United	Yangon United Sports Complex, Yangon
16:00 UTC+06:30	Marcelo 20'; Kunihiro Yamashita 76'

=== Week 11 ===
2016-04-02	Yadanarbon	3–2	Yangon United	Bahtoo Stadium, Mandalay
16:00 UTC+06:30	Myo Ko Tun 42'; Keith Martu Nah 47' (pen.); Win Naing Soe 60'		Marcel 6', 22'

2016-04-02	Zwekapin United	0–1	Ayeyawady United	Thuwunna Stadium, Yangon
16:00 UTC+06:30			Aung Kyaw Naing 50'

2016-04-03	Rakhine United	1–1	Shan United	Aung San Stadium, Yangon
16:00 UTC+06:30	Ye Win Hlaing 59'		Soe Min Oo 41'

2016-04-03	Horizon	0–0	Southern Myanmar	Thuwunna Stadium, Yangon
15:30 UTC+06:30

2016-04-04	Chin United	1–1	Zeyar Shwe Myay	Aung San Stadium, Yangon
16:00 UTC+06:30	Zaw Win 75'		Ibrahim 9'

2016-04-04	Magwe	2–1	Hanthawaddy United	Thuwunna Stadium, Yangon
16:00 UTC+06:30	Aung Phyo Myint 23' (o.g); Sylla 45'		Bamba 65'

=== Week 12 ===
2016-05-21	Ayeyawady United	3–5	Yadanarbon	Ayar Stadium, Ayeyawady
16:00 UTC+06:30	Christopher 64'; Aung Kyaw Naing 73'; Takumu 90'		Win Naing Soe 6'; Aung Thu 38', 41', 72'; Ye Ko Oo 45+1'

2016-05-21	Magwe	0–2	Yangon United	Thuwunna Stadium, Yangon
16:00 UTC+06:30			Kyaw Ko Ko 3'; David Htan 85'

2016-05-22	Zwekapin United	0–1	Chin United	Thuwunna Stadium, Yangon
16:00 UTC+06:30			Sackie 17'

2016-05-22	Hanthawaddy United	2–3	Shan United	Aung San Stadium, Yangon
16:00 UTC+06:30	Ivan 43'; Maung Maung Lwin 56'		Gustavo 20', 55'; Zin Min Tun 40'

2016-05-23	Zeyar Shwe Myay	3–2	Horizon	Monywa Stadium, Sagaing
15:30 UTC+06:30	Ibrahim 4'; Nan Min Aung 49'; Victor 50'		Aung Thike 18'; Martin 57'

2016-05-23	Southern Myanmar	3–0	Rakhine United	Aung San Stadium, Yangon
15:30 UTC+06:30	Michael Chukwubunna 30'; Yan Naing Htwe 39'; Chika Philip 58'

=== Week 13 ===
2016-06-11	Shan United	1–0	Rakhine United	Taunggyi Stadium, Taunggyi
16:00 UTC+06:30	Gustavo 38'			Attendance: 1000

2016-06-11	Hanthawaddy United	1–4	Magwe	Taungoo Stadium, Pago
16:00 UTC+06:30	Maung Maung Lwin 78'		Nanda Kyaw 15'; Ko Ko Naing 43'; Sylla 65'; Htoo Htoo Aung 71'	Attendance: 5000

2016-06-12	Southern Myanmar	3–1	Horizon	Thuwunna Stadium, Yangon
16:00 UTC+06:30	Yan Naing Htwe 19'; Michael Chukwubunna 69', 90+2'		Aung Kyaw Htwe 90+4'

2016-06-12	Yangon United	1–2	Yadanarbon	YUSC Stadium, Yangon
16:00 UTC+06:30	Kyaw Ko Ko 11'		Hlaing Bo Bo 44', 45+2'

2016-06-12	Zeyar Shwe Myay	5–0	Chin United	Monywa Stadium, Sagaing
15:30 UTC+06:30	Mercio 27', 42'; Dedi Gusmawan 65'; Victor (goal 90) Kaung Sithu 90+4'

2016-06-12	Ayeyawady United	1–1	Zwekapin United	Ayar Stadium, Ayeyawady
15:30 UTC+06:30	Takumu		Tin Win Aung

=== Week 14 ===
2016-06-18	Hanthawaddy United	1–1	Ayeyawady United	Taungoo Stadium, Taungoo
15:30 UTC+06:30	Bamba 62'		Christopher 56'

2016-06-18	Zwekapin United	2–1	Rakhine United	Thuwunna Stadium, Yangon
16:00 UTC+06:30	Tin Win Aung 50'; Asare 90+1'		Adeolu 80'

2016-06-18	Zeyar Shwe Myay	1–0	Southern Myanmar	Monywa Stadium, Sagaing
15:30 UTC+06:30	Mercio 78'

2016-06-19	Yangon United	0–2	Shan United	YUSC Stadium, Yangon
15:30 UTC+06:30			Yan Naing Oo 57'; Gustavo 80'

2016-06-19	Yadanarbon	3–1	Horizon	Bahtoo Stadium, Mandalay
15:30 UTC+06:30	Win Naing Soe 10', 17', 81'		Ernest 30'

2016-06-19	Chin United	0–3	Magwe	Thuwunna Stadium
15:30 UTC+06:30			Sylla 12'; Htoo Htoo Aung 35'; Kyaw Zin Lwin 73'

=== Week 15 ===
2016-06-25	Rakhine United	0–2	Yadanarbon	THuwunna Stadium, Yangon
16:00 UTC+06:30			Keith Martu Nah 27' (pen.); Myo Ko Tun 75'

2016-06-25	Horizon	0–1	Magwe	Aung San Stadium, Yangon
16:00 UTC+06:30			Djam 2'

2016-06-26	Shan United	0–1	Zeyar Shwe Myay	Taunggyi Stadium, Shan
15:30 UTC+06:30			Mercio 90'

2016-06-26	Yangon United	1–1	Ayeyawady United	YUSC Stadium, Yangon
15:30 UTC+06:30	Thein Zaw 74'		Takumu 90+4'

2016-06-26	Hanthawaddy United	3–2	Chin United	Taungoo Stadium, Taungoo
15:30 UTC+06:30	Sithu Than Soe 21'; Ivan 64'; Yan Naing Aung 90+4'		Nyi Nyi Min 37', 67'

2016-06-26	Southern Myanmar	1–3	Zwekapin United	Thuwunna Stadium
16:00 UTC+06:30	Ibrahima 41'		Zin Phyo Aung 28'; Tin Win Aung 64'; Saw Si Ai 90+1'

=== Week 16 ===
2016-07-02	Shan United	0–0	Ayeyawady United	Taunggyi Stadium, Taunggyi
15:30 UTC+06:30

2016-07-02	Chin United	1–3	Yangon United	Aung San Stadium, Yangon
16:00 UTC+06:30	Suan Lam Mang 47'		Kyaw Ko Ko 2', 10', 16'

2016-07-02	Zwekapin United	2–0	Zeyar Shwe Myay	Taunggyi Stadium, Shan
15:30 UTC+06:30	Aung Moe 25'; Saw Si Ai 84'

2016-07-03	Yadanarbon	5–1	Southern Myanmar	Bahtoo Stadium, Mandalay
15:30 UTC+06:30	Keith Martu Nah 11'; Win Naing Soe 40', 45'; Shine Thuya 75'; Myo Ko Tun 90'		Micheal 65'

2016-07-03	Horizon	1–1	Hanthawaddy United	Thuwunna Stadium, Yangon
16:00 UTC+06:30	Ernest 75' (pen.)		Bamba 84'

2016-07-03	Magwe	2–1	Rakhine United	Aung San Stadium, Yangon
16:00 UTC+06:30	Htoo Htoo Aung 24'; Sylla 81'		Andrey Coutinho 39'

=== Week 17 ===
2016-07-09	Yangon United	6–2	Horizon	YUSC Stadium, Yangon
15:30 UTC+06:30	Adilson 27', 28'; Kyaw Ko Ko 36', 56', 60'; Zon Moe Aung 50'		Ernest 11'; Aung Kyaw Htwe 38'

2016-07-09	Hanthawaddy United	1–0	Rakhine United	Taungoo Stadium, Bago
16:00 UTC+06:30	Bamba 66'

2016-07-09	Southern Myanmar	0–1	Magwe	Aung San Stadium, Yangon
15:30 UTC+06:30			Soe Min Naing 39'

2016-07-10	Shan United	2–1	Zwekapin United	Taunggyi Stadium, Taunggyi
15:30 UTC+06:30	Soe Min Oo 63'; Zin Min Tun 75'		Saw Si Ai 90+4'

2016-07-10	Ayeywady United	1–1	Chin United	Ayar Stadium, Pathein
16:00 UTC+06:30	Takumu 84'		Chit Su Moe 65'

2016-07-10	Zeyar Shwe Myay	1–0	Yadanarbon	Monywa Stadium, Sagaing
16:00 UTC+06:30	Nan Min Aung 76'

=== Week 18 ===
2016-07-15	Chin United	0–3	Shan United	Thuwunna Stadium, Yangon
15:30 UTC+06:30			Yan Naing Oo 17'; Soe Min Oo 53', 82'

2016-07-16	Magwe	1–1	Zeyar Shwe Myay	Thuwunna Stadium, Yangon
16:00 UTC+06:30	Aung Soe Moe 77'		Mercio 63'

2016-07-16	Horizon	2–6	Ayeyawady United	Aung San Stadium, Yangon
15:30 UTC+06:30	Sunday 29' (pen.)		Christopher 17', 57'; Thiha Zaw 45', 60'; Takumu 55'; Aung Kyaw Naing 82'

2016-07-17	Rakhine United	0–0	Yangon United	Aung San Stadium, Yangon
15:30 UTC+06:30

2016-07-17	Yadanarbon	1–0	Zwekapin United	Bahtoo Stadium, Yangon
16:00 UTC+06:30	Win Naing Soe 90+2'

2016-07-17	Hanthawaddy United	2–3	Southern Myanmar	Taungoo Stadium, Taungoo
16:00 UTC+06:30	Chit Hla Aung 56'; Bamba 59'		Chika Philip 8', 26'; Micheal 86'

=== Week 19 ===
2016-07-23	Zwekapin United	0–1	Magwe	Thuwunna Stadium, Yangon
15:30 UTC+06:30			Sylla 80'

2016-07-23	Ayeyawady United	0–2	Rakhine United	Ayar Stadium, Pathein
16:00 UTC+06:30			Andrey Coutinho 3'; Myo Zaw Oo 28'

2016-07-23	Chin United	2–1	Horizon	Aung San Stadium, Yangon
15:30 UTC+06:30	Suan Lam Mang 22' (pen.); Nyi Nyi Min 30'		Aung Kyaw Htwe 19'

2016-07-24	Yangon United	1–0	Southern Myanmar	YUSC Stadium, Yangon
15:30 UTC+06:30	Marcelo 43'

2016-07-17	Yadanarbon	1–1	Shan United	Bahtoo Stadium, Mandalay
16:00 UTC+06:30	Keith Martu Nah 45' (pen.)		Soe Min Oo 38'

2016-07-24	Zeyar Shwe Myay	3–0	Hantahrwady United	Monywa Stadium, Monywa
16:00 UTC+06:30	Mercio 33', 34'; Kaung Sithu 70'

=== Week 20 ===
2016-08-05	Southern Myanmar	0–5	Ayeyawady United	Thuwunna Stadium, Yangon
16:00 UTC+06:30			Christopher 43', 50' (pen.), 66', 74' (pen.); Takumu 87'

2016-08-06	Magwe	1–0	Yadanarbon	Thuwunna Stadium, Yangon
16:00 UTC+06:30	Than Zaw Hein 30'

2016-08-06	Rakhine United	1–1	Chin United	Aung San Stadium, Yangon
16:00 UTC+06:30	Andrey Coutinho 56'		Suan Lam Mang 24'

2016-08-07	Hanthawaddy United	0–0	Zwekapin United	Taungoo Stadium, Bago
15:30 UTC+06:30

2016-08-07	Yangon United	2–2	Zeyar Shwe Myay	YUSC Stadium, Yangon
16:00 UTC+06:30	Yamashita 8'; Thein Zaw 41'		Ibrahim 24'; Mercio 65'

2016-08-07	Horizon	0–3	Shan United	Aung San Stadium, Yangon
16:00 UTC+06:30			Soe Min Oo 3'; Yan Naing Oo 73'; Maximum 84'

=== Week 21 ===
2016-08-13	Zwekapin United	2–3	Yangon United	Thuwunna Stadium, Yangon
16:00 UTC+06:30	Tin Win Aung 18'; Ken 77' (pen.)		Kyaw Ko Ko 6'; Adilson 16'; Zaw Min Tun 89'

2016-08-13	Yadanarbon	3–1	Hanthawaddy United	Bahtoo Stadium, Mandalay
16:00 UTC+06:30	Keith Martu Nah 42', 85' (pen.); Win Naing Soe 69'		Bamba 13'

2016-08-13	Ayeyawady United	2–1	Zeyar Shwe Myay	Ayar Stadium, Pathein
16:00 UTC+06:30	Yan Paing Soe 15'; Christopher 17'		Nan Min Aung 32'

2016-08-14	Shan United	0–0	Magwe	Taunggyi Stadium, Shan
15:30 UTC+06:30

2016-08-14	Chin United	0–0	Southern Myanmar	Thuwunna Stadium, Yangon
16:00 UTC+06:30

2016-08-14	Horizon	1–1	Rakhine United	Aung San Stadium, Yangon
16:00 UTC+06:30	Martin 56'		Dway Ko Ko Chit 78'

=== Week 22 ===
2016-08-20	Shan United	3–0	Southern Myanmar	Taunggyi Stadium, Taunggyi
16:00 UTC+06:30	Soe Min Oo 15'; Yan Naing Oo 45'; Kyaw Zin Win 62' (o.g)

2016-08-20	Yangon United	2–1	Hanthawaddy United	YUSC Stadium, Yangon
15:30 UTC+06:30	Kyaw Ko Ko 25'; Adilson 48'		Min Ko Thu 90+4'

2016-08-20	Ayeyawady United	2–1	Magwe	Ayar Stadium, Pathein
15:30 UTC+06:30	Takumu 27', 43'		Micheal 85'

2016-08-20	Yadanarbon	5–0	Chin United	Bahtoo Stadium, Mandalay
15:30 UTC+06:30	Aung Thu 3'; Win Naing Soe 16', 57', 75'; Keith Martu Nah 28'

2016-08-21	Rakhine United	1–2	Zeyar Shwe Myay	Thuwunna Stadium, Yangon
16:00 UTC+06:30	Zaw Zaw Naing 25'		Victor 5' (pen.); Mercio 55'

2016-08-21	Horizon	2–3	Zwekapin United	Aung San Stadium, Yangon
16:00 UTC+06:30	Mathew 25', 58'		Aye Ko Ko Maung 9'; Ken 43' (pen.); Thet Paing oo 49' (o.g)

== Top scorers ==
No	Name	Club	Goal
1	(Myanmar) Win Naing Soe	Yadanarbon	16
2	(Liberia) Keith Martu Nah	Yadanarbon	16
3	(Nigeria) Christopher Chizoba	Ayeyawady United	16
4	(Myanmar) Kyaw Ko Ko	Yangon United	13
5	(Brazil) Andrey Coutinho	Rakhine United	10
6	(Nigeria) Bamba Gaoussou	Hanthawaddy United	10
7	(Guinea) Sekou Sylla	Magwe	9
8	(Myanmar) Soe Min Oo	Shan United	9
9	(Myanmar) Aung Thu	Yadanarbon	8
10	(Brazil) Adilson	Yangon United	9
11	(Japan) Takumu	Ayeyawady United	9
12	(Brazil) Ivan	Hanthawaddy United	7
13	(Costa Rica) Victor Coto Ortega	Zeyar Shwe Myay	7
14	(Korea) Ken	Zwekapin United	7
15	(Myanmar) Aung Kyaw Naing	Ayeyawady United	6

== Clean Sheets ==
No	Goalkeeper	Club	Matches
1	(Myanmar) Thiha Sithu	Shan United	10
2	(Myanmar) Yan Aung Lin	Yadanarbon	7
3	(Myanmar) Van Lal Hruaia	Ayeyawady United	6
4	(Myanmar) Mung Htoi Aung	Chin United	6
5	(Myanmar) Phyo Min Maung	Zeyar Shwe Myay	5

== Awards ==
=== Monthly awards ===
Month	Coach of the Month		Player of the Month		Reference
Month	Coach	Club	Player	Club	Reference
January	(Myanmar) Ngwe Tun	Hanthawaddy United	(Myanmar) Maung Maung Lwin	Hanthawaddy United	
February	(North Macedonia) Marjan Sekulovski	Yangon United	(Liberia) Keith Martu Nah	Yadanarbon	
March	(Belgium) René Desaeyere	Yadanarbon	(Liberia) Keith Martu Nah	Yadanarbon	
April					
May					
June	(Belgium) René Desaeyere	Yadanarbon	(Brazil) Marcio Gomes	Zeyar Shwe Myay	
July	(Myanmar) U Kyi Lwin	Magwe	(Myanmar) Kyaw Ko Ko	Yangon United	
August	(Myanmar) Myo Min Tun	Yangon United	(Myanmar) Win Naing Soe	Yadanarbon	

== See also ==
- 2016 MNL-2
- 2016 General Aung San Shield
- 2016 MFF Charity Cup
- List of Myanmar football transfers summer 2016
