= 2019 Yadanarbon F.C. season =

Yadanarbon
2019 season
- Owner: (Myanmar) Dr. Sai Sam Tun
- Manager: (Myanmar) Aung Kyaw Moe
- Stadium: Bahtoo Stadium

== Sponsorship ==
Period	Sportswear	Sponsor
2019	(Thailand) FBT	(Myanmar) Alpine

== Club ==
=== Coaching staff ===
Position	Staff
General Manager	(Myanmar) Aung Tun Oo
Head Coach	(Myanmar) Aung Kyaw Moe
Assistant Coach	(Myanmar) Zaw Lay Aung
Assistant Coach	(Myanmar) Yan Paing

Source: Yadanarbon FC

=== Other information ===
Owner	(Myanmar) Dr. Sai Sam Tun
Ground (capacity and dimensions)	Bahtoo Stadium (17,000 / 103x67 metres)
Training Ground	Bahtoo Stadium

== 2019 Players squad ==
Note: Flags indicate national team as defined under FIFA eligibility rules; some limited exceptions apply. Players may hold more than one non-FIFA nationality.

No.	Pos.	Nation	Player
3	DF	MYA	Kyaw Thet Oo
4	DF	MYA	Zaw Ye Tun
5	DF	MYA	Ye Yint Aung (1)
6	MF	MYA	Myat Kaung Khant
7	MF	MYA	Ye Ko Oo (Captain)
8	MF	MYA	Bi Bi
9	FW	MYA	Win Naing Tun
10	MF	MYA	Mg Mg Soe
11	FW	MYA	Thet Naing
14	DF	MYA	Hlaing Myo Aung
15	DF	MYA	Eant Maw Oo
16	MF	MYA	Myo Ko Tun
17	MF	MYA	Thet Shine Naung
18	FW	MYA	Arkar
19	MF	MYA	Hlaing Bo Bo (Vice Captain)

No.	Pos.	Nation	Player
20	FW	MYA	Myint Thein Tun
21	MF	MYA	Pyae Sone Naing
22	DF	MYA	Kyaw Zin Soe
23	DF	MYA	Hein Nay San
25	GK	MYA	Pyae Lyan Aung
27	FW	MYA	Ye Yint Aung (2)
29	FW	MYA	Win Naing Soe
30	DF	MYA	Nay Myo Aung
31	MF	MYA	Aung Naing Win
32	GK	MYA	Chan Nyein Kyaw
33	DF	MYA	Thein Than Win
50	GK	MYA	Pyae Sone Chit
70	MF	MYA	Win Htay Kyaw

=== Out on loan ===
Note: Flags indicate national team as defined under FIFA eligibility rules; some limited exceptions apply. Players may hold more than one non-FIFA nationality.

No.	Pos.	Nation	Player
—	MF	MYA	Sithu Aung (on loan to (Thailand) Chonburi)
—	FW	MYA	Aung Thu (on loan to (Thailand) Muangthong United)

=== Transfer In ===
Note: Flags indicate national team as defined under FIFA eligibility rules; some limited exceptions apply. Players may hold more than one non-FIFA nationality.

No.	Pos.	Nation	Player
—	MF	MYA	Thet Shine Naung (transfer from (Myanmar) Rakhine United)
—	MF	MYA	Maung Maung Soe (transfer from (Myanmar) Magwe)
—	MF	MYA	Hlaing Myo Aung (transfer from (Myanmar) Shan United)

=== Transfer Out ===
Note: Flags indicate national team as defined under FIFA eligibility rules; some limited exceptions apply. Players may hold more than one non-FIFA nationality.

No.	Pos.	Nation	Player
—	FW	MYA	Shine Thura (transfer to Southern Myanmar)
—	DF	MYA	Ye Yint Tun (transfer to (Myanmar) Shan United)

== Competition ==
=== Myanmar National League ===
==== Table ====
Pos	Team	Pld	W	D	L	GF	GA	GD	Pts	Qualification or relegation
2	Ayeyawady United	22	12	8	2	44	19	+25	44	
3	Yangon United	22	12	7	3	40	15	+25	43	Qualification for AFC Cup play-off round (Note: Yangon United qualified for the AFC Cup play-off round as General Aung San Shield winners.)
4	Yadanarbon	22	9	5	8	41	32	+9	32	
5	Hantharwady United	22	9	5	8	28	27	+1	32	
6	Rakhine United	22	7	10	5	28	29	−1	31	

Source: MNL
Rules for classification: 1) Points; 2) Goal difference; 3) Goals scored.

==== Matches ====
13 January 2019 1	Yadanarbon FC	1-1	Ayeyawady United F.C.	Mandalay, Myanmar
15:30 MMT	Myat Kaung Khant 90+1'		Zaw Lin 60'	Stadium: Bahtoo Stadium

19 January 2019 2	Yadanarbon FC	2-2	Shan United F.C.	Mandalay, Myanmar
15:30 MMT	Win Naing Tun 13', 90+4'		Dedimar 9'; Htet Phyo Wai 55'	Stadium: Bahtoo Stadium

27 January 2019 3	Yadanarbon FC	3-2	Yangon United F.C.	Mandalay, Myanmar
15:30 MMT	Win Naing Tun 16', 58'; Hlaing Bo Bo 48'		Oliveira 29'; Kaung Htet Soe 72'	Stadium: Bahtoo Stadium

2 February 2019 4	Yadanarbon FC	1-0	Magwe F.C.	Mandalay, Myanmar
15:30 MMT	Win Naing Tun 67'			Stadium: Bahtoo Stadium

3 March 2019 5	Yadanarbon FC	0-2	Hanthawaddy United F.C.	Mandalay, Myanmar
15:30 MMT			Sekyi Mark 9'; Htet Lin Lin 57'	Stadium: Bahtoo Stadium

30 March 2019 6	Yadanarbon FC	1-0	Dagon FC	Mandalay, Myanmar
16:00 MMT	Win Naing Soe 36'			Stadium: Bahtoo Stadium

6 April 2019 7	Zwekapin United F.C.	0-4	Yadanarbon FC	Yangon, Myanmar
16:00 MMT			Win Naing Soe 12', 14', 75', 90+3'	Stadium: Thuwunna Stadium

20 April 2019 8	Chinland F.C.	1-2	Yadanarbon FC	Yangon, Myanmar
16:00 MMT	Babadunde Abiodun 39'		Win Naing Tun 15', 69'	Stadium: Thuwunna Stadium

28 April 2019 9	Southern Myanmar F.C.	1-3	Yadanarbon FC	Mawlamyine, Myanmar
16:00 MMT	Yan Kyaw Htwe 26'		Myat Kaung Khant 18'; Bi Bi 30'; Win Naing Soe 78' (pen.)	Stadium: Yamanya Stadium

5 May 2019 10	Rakhine United F.C.	3-2	Yadanarbon FC	Sittwe, Myanmar
15:30 MMT	Abubakar Yakubu 57'; Zaw Zaw Naing 59'; Samuel 90'		Win Naing Soe 22', 81'	Stadium: Wai Thar Li Stadium

12 May 2019 11	Yadanarbon FC	v	Sagaing United F.C.	Mandalay, Myanmar
15:30 MMT				Stadium: Bahtoo Stadium

=== General Aung San Shield ===
1 May 2019	Ayeyawady United F.C.	1-2	Yadanarbon FC	Yangon, Myanmar
15:30 MMT	Thiha Zaw 69'		Win Naing Soe 61', 117'	Stadium: Aung San Stadium
