= 2016 General Aung San Shield =

2016 Bogyoke Aung San Shield
MFF Cup

Tournament details
- Country: Myanmar
- City: Yangon
- Venue: Bogyoke Aung San Stadium
- Dates: 18 May 2016 – 17 August 2016
- Teams: 24

Final positions
- Champions: Magwe F.C. (1st title)
- Runners-up: Yangon United F.C.

Tournament statistics
- Matches played: 25
- Goals scored: 71 (2.84 per match)
- Top goal scorer: Win Naing Soe (6 goals)

The 2016 General Aung San Shield (Burmese: Bogyoke Aung San Shield) is the second season of Myanmar knockout football competition. The tournament is organized by the Myanmar Football Federation. It is the league cup competition started in 2016 Myanmar football season. This cup succeeded the Myanmar Football Federation Cup. MFF has changed the cup competition style as follows.

In the first round, ten clubs competing in 2016 MNL-2 and two clubs which were promoted to 2016 MNL, twelve teams in total, will be involved playing at a neutral ground with six teams emerged as winners. In the second round, ten clubs competing in 2015 MNL and the six winners from the first round, sixteen teams in total, will be involved playing at a neutral ground with eight teams emerged as winners. The Quarter-finals will still be played as one-legged matches but the Semi-final will be competed as two-legged (Home and Away) matches.

The cup winner is guaranteed a place in the 2017 AFC Cup.

== Prize fund ==
Round	No. of Clubs receive fund	Prize fund per club
Final runners-up	1	150,000,000MMK
Final winner	1	300,000,000MMK
Total		450,000,000MMK

== Results ==
=== Preliminary round ===
Preliminary round consists of two rounds for teams currently playing in the Regional League Division 1 level. The First round was held 25 April 2015.

==== First round ====
18 May 2016	Myawaddy FC	0 - 0 (4 - 3 p)	GFA

18 May 2016	Rakhine United	2 - 0	City Stars
	Myo Zaw Oo 12', 62'

18 May 2015	Mawyawadi	2 - 2 (a.e.t.) (2 - 3 p)	Southern Myanmar

19 May 2016	Pong Gan	0 - 3	Horizon
			Sunday Mathew 46', 72'; Martin 85'

19 May 2016	Silver Star	1 - 3	Chin United
			Bawi Nuam Thang 45+2'; Suan Lam Mang 47', 70'

19 May 2016	University	0 - 0 (4 - 5 p)	Nay Pyi Taw

20 May 2016	Mahar United	8 - 1	United of Thanlyin
	Thaw Tar Cholar 6'; Joseph 13', 16', 75'; Toe Set Naing 35', 66'; Aung Hlaing Win 84'; Aung Phyo Lin 88'		Aung Thu Hein 90'

20 May 2016	Manaw Myay	1 - 0	Dagon

==== Second round ====
15 June 2016	Yangon United	1 - 0	Mahar United	Aung San Stadium
	Than Paing 87'

15 June 2016	Hantharwady United	2 - 1	Manaw Myay	Thuwunna Stadium
	Maung Maung Lwin 48'; Ivan 77'		Dornal Visar 82'

22 June 2016	Zeyar Shwe Myay	1 - 2	Myawaddy FC
	Mercio 81'		Ye Wai Yan Soe 22'; Kaung Sithu 30'

22 June 2016	Shan United	3 - 1	Nay Pyi Taw
	Maximum 50'; Soe Min Oo 52'; Zin Min Tun 55'		Yan Kha 47'

29 June 2016	Yadanarbon FC	4 - 1	Horizon	Thuwunna Stadium ,Yangon
	Win Naing Soe 12', 77', 84'; Keith Martu Nah 60' (pen.)		Changhee Kim 89'

29 June 2016	Magwe	2 - 1	Chin United	Aung San Stadium, Yangon
	Soe Min Naing 70'; Htoo Htoo Aung 71'		Nyi Nyi Min 1'

6 July 2016	Zwegapin United	3 - 0	Southern Myanmar United
	Patrick Asare 11'; Aye Ko Ko Maung 27'; Aung Thu Win 83'

6 July 2016	Ayeyawady United	0 - 1	Rakhine United
			Dway Ko Ko Chit 20'

=== Quarterfinal ===
13 July 2016	Yangon United	3 - 0	Hantharwady United	Bogyoke Aung San Stadium
4:00 PM	Thein Zaw 22'; Adilson 29' (pen.); Kyaw Ko Ko 62'

13 July 2016	Yadanarbon FC	3 - 1	Myawady FC	Thuwunna Stadium
4:00 PM	Win Naing Soe 11', 50', 60'		Ye Wai Yan Soe 39'

20 July 2016	Shan United	0 - 1	Magwe	Bogyoke Aung San Stadium
4:00 PM			Than Zaw Hein 43'

20 July 2016	Zwekapin United	4 - 1	Rakhine United	Thuwunna Stadium
4:00 PM	Patrick 52', 64'; Tin Win Aung 76'; Saw Si Ai 90'		Kazeem 80'

=== First leg ===
30 July 2016	Yangon United	1 - 1	Yadanarbon FC	Yangon
16:00 MST	Marcelo 43'		Keith Nah 47'	Stadium: Thuwunna Stadium; Attendance: unknown Referee: (Thailand) Sivakorn Pu Udom

31 July 2016	Magwe	2 - 0	Zwekapin United	Yangon
16:00 MST	Set Phyo Wai 15'; Sylla 84'			Stadium: Thuwunna Stadium

=== Second leg ===
10 August 2016	Yadanarbon FC	1 - 2	Yangon United	Mandalay
16:00 MST	Keith Martu Nah 58'		Yamashita 67'; Yan Lin Aung 90+3'	Stadium: Mandalarthiri Stadium; Attendance: 23080

11 August 2016	Zwekapin United	2 - 1	Magwe	Yangon
16:00 MST	Ken 68', 94'		Sylla 49'	Stadium: Aung San Stadium

=== Final ===
17 August 2016	Yangon United	1 - 2	Magwe	Yangon
16:00 MST	Zaw Min Tun 40'		Micheal 69'; Sylla 75'	Stadium: Bogyoke Aung San Stadium; Attendance: 11,000; Referee: (Laos) Mr.Xaypaseuth Phonsanit

== Top goalscorers ==
Rank	Player	Club	Goals
1	Win Naing Soe	Yadanarbon	6
2	Joseph	Mahar United	3
3	Patrick Asare	Zwekapin United	3
4	Suan Lam Mang	Chin United	2
5	Toe Sat Naing	Mahar United	2
