= Yadanarbon F.C.–Yangon United F.C. rivalry =

- Other names: Super Myanmar derby
- Location: Central-Southern Myanmar
- Teams: Yadanarbon; Yangon United
- First meeting: Yadanarbon 2–2 Yangon United (13 October 2009); Myanmar National League Cup
- Latest meeting: Yadanarbon 1-3 Yangon United (23 June 2025); MNL Cup

Statistics
- Total meetings: 30
- Most wins: Yangon United (14)
- Most player appearances: Yan Aung Kyaw (25 matches)
- All-time series: Yangon United: 14; Drawn: 9 Yadanarbon: 7

The Yadanarbon–Yangon United or Super Myanmar derby is a notable rivalry in Myanmar football as between Yadanarbon Football Club and Yangon United Football Club; first contested in 2009. Yadanarbon plays at the Bahtoo Stadium in Mandalay and Yangon United at the Thuwunna Stadium in Yangon. Although the two clubs have frequently been in the same division, the rivalry has largely arisen before 2009. It has been noted for on-field troubles, culminating in 2014 and 2015.

== Origins ==
In 2009 MNL Cup, Yangon United met Yadanarbon drew 2–2 for first time ever. In 2009 MNL Cup final, they met again. They drew 2–2 and Yadanarbon won in penalty shootout (4–1), winning their first MNL Cup.

=== Football rivalry ===
See also: Yadanarbon F.C. and Yangon United F.C.

Both clubs have enjoyed periods of dominance over Myanmar football. Yadanarbon dominated from 2009 to 2011, winning 2 MNL league championships and 1 AFC President's Cup. Likewise, Yangon United dominated from 2011 to 2015, winning 4 league championships and 1 national cup.

=== League ===
As of 8 February 2025

==== Yadanarbon league home record ====
Season	Venue	Home	Score	Away	Competition
2009	Bahtoo Stadium	Yadanarbon	0–2	Yangon	MNL
2010	Bahtoo Stadium	Yadanarbon	1–4	Yangon	MNL
2011	Bahtoo Stadium	Yadanarbon	0–2	Yangon	MNL
2012	Bahtoo Stadium	Yadanarbon	1–1	Yangon	MNL
2013	Bahtoo Stadium	Yadanarbon	1–1	Yangon	MNL
2014	Bahtoo Stadium	Yadanarbon	1–0	Yangon	MNL
2015	Bahtoo Stadium	Yadanarbon	2–3	Yangon	MNL
2016	Bahtoo Stadium	Yadanarbon	3–2	Yangon	MNL
2017	Bahtoo Stadium	Yadanarbon	3–0	Yangon	MNL
2018	Bahtoo Stadium	Yadanarbon	1–2	Yangon	MNL
2019	Bahtoo Stadium	Yadanarbon	3–2	Yangon	MNL
2020	Bahtoo Stadium	Yadanarbon	1–3	Yangon	MNL
2022	Bahtoo Stadium	Yadanarbon	2–4	Yangon	MNL
2023	Bahtoo Stadium	Yadanarbon	0–3	Yangon	MNL
2024–25	Bahtoo Stadium	Yadanarbon	2–5	Yangon	MNL

==== Yangon United league home record ====
Date	Venue	Home	Score	Away	Competition
2009	Thuwunna Stadium	Yangon	1–2	Yadanarbon	MNL
2010	Thuwunna Stadium	Yangon	0–0	Yadanarbon	MNL
2011	Thuwunna Stadium	Yangon	2–1	Yadanarbon	MNL
2012	Thuwunna Stadium	Yangon	2–2	Yadanarbon	MNL
2013	Thuwunna Stadium	Yangon	2–2	Yadanarbon	MNL
2014	Thuwunna Stadium	Yangon	2–2	Yadanarbon	MNL
2015	Thuwunna Stadium	Yangon	2–3	Yadanarbon	MNL
2016	Thuwunna Stadium	Yangon	1–2	Yadanarbon	MNL
2017	Thuwunna Stadium	Yangon	2–1	Yadanarbon	MNL
2018	Thuwunna Stadium	Yangon	3–3	Yadanarbon	MNL
2019	Thuwunna Stadium	Yangon	1–0	Yadanarbon	MNL
2020	Thuwunna Stadium	Yangon	2–2	Yadanarbon	MNL
2022	Thuwunna Stadium	Yangon	2–0	Yadanarbon	MNL
2023	Thuwunna Stadium	Yangon	4–0	Yadanarbon	MNL
2024–25	Thuwunna Stadium	Yangon	1–1	Yadanarbon	MNL

== Honours ==
Yadanarbon	Competition	Yangon United
Domestic
4	Myanmar National League	5
1	MNL Cup/General Aung San Shield/MFF Cup	3
–	MFF Charity Cup	3
5	Aggregate	10
Continental
1	AFC President's Cup	–
1	Aggregate	–
6	Total aggregate	10

== Shared players history ==
Yadanarbon to Yangon United

- Zaw Min Tun – December 2014
- Kekere Moukailou – December 2016

Yangon United to Yadanarbon

- Kaung Sithu – December 2013
- Yan Aung Win – December 2013
- Sithu Aung – December 2014
