= 2017 General Aung San Shield =

MFF Cup

Tournament details
- Country: Myanmar
- City: Yangon
- Venue: Bogyoke Aung San Stadium
- Dates: 2 May 2017 – 25 October 2017
- Teams: 22

Final positions
- Champions: Shan United (1st title)
- Runners-up: Yangon United

Tournament statistics
- Matches played: 21
- Goals scored: 77 (3.67 per match)
- Top goal scorer: Han Kyung-In (4 goals)

The 2017 General Aung San Shield (Burmese: Bogyoke Aung San Shield) is the third season of Myanmar knockout football competition. The tournament is organized by the Myanmar Football Federation. It is the league cup competition started in 2017 Myanmar football season. This cup succeeded the Myanmar Football Federation Cup. MFF has changed the cup competition style as follows.

In the first round, ten clubs competing in 2017 MNL-2 and two clubs which were promoted to 2017 MNL, twelve teams in total, will be involved playing at a neutral ground with six teams emerged as winners. In the second round, ten clubs competing in 2016 MNL, and the six winners from the first round, sixteen teams in total, will be involved playing at a neutral ground with eight teams emerged as winners. The Quarter-finals will still be played as one-legged matches, but the Semi-final will be competed as two-legged (Home and Away) matches.

The cup winner is guaranteed a place in the 2018 AFC Cup.

== Prize fund ==
| Round | No. of Clubs receive fund | Prize fund per club |
|---|---|---|
| Champion | 1 | K300,000,000 |
| Final runners-up | 1 | K150,000,000 |
| Semi-Final | 2 | K75,000,000 |

== Results ==
=== Preliminary round ===
Preliminary round consists of two rounds for teams currently playing in the Regional League Division 1 level. The First round was held 24 April 2017.

==== First round ====
| 2 May 2017 | Pong Gan | 1–1 (5–4 p) | GFA | Thuwunna Stadium |
| 16:00 MMT | Khan Kyint Man 78' | | Mark Sekyi 21' |

| 2 May 2017 | Silver Stars | 1–2 | City Stars | Aung San Stadium |
| 16:00 MMT | Naung Naung Kyaw 13' | | Naing Ko Lin 48', 72' |

| 3 May 2017 | Phoenix | 4–2 | Mawyawadi | Thuwunna Stadium |
| 16:00 MMT | Pyae Sone Naing 45+2', 84'; Myat Kaung Khant 60'; Win Naing Tun 73' | | Zyar Kyaw 22', 45' |

| 3 May 2017 | Myawady | 1–1 (4–3 p) | City Yangon | Aung San Stadium |
| 16:00 MMT | | | Ernest 54' |

| 4 May 2017 | Nay Pyi Taw | 1–1 (5–4 p) | Dagon | Thuwunna Stadium |
| 16:00 MMT | Salif 80' | | Zaw Zin Oo 72' |

| 4 May 2017 | Mahar United | 7–1 | University | Aung San Stadium |
| 16:00 MMT | Samuel 9', 38', 45', 49'; Barnas Friday F 25', 74'; Toe Sat Naing 40' | | Aung Thant Zaw 20' |

==== Second round ====
| 10 May 2017 | Hantharwady United | 3–1 (a.e.t.) | Zwekapin United | Aung San Stadium |
| 16:00 MMT | Mercio Gomez 43', 99', 120' (pen.) | | Matsumoto Ken 57' |

| 10 May 2017 | Yangon United | 3–0 | Myawady | Thuwunna Stadium |
| 16:00 MMT | Pyae Phyo Zaw 11'; Kyaw Ko Ko 20', 85' |

| 11 May 2017 | Rakhine United | 3–0 | Chin United | Thuwunna Stadium |
| 16:00 MMT | Thet Shine Naung 2'; Sunday Mathew 42'; Dway Ko Ko Chit 79' |

| 11 May 2017 | Ayeyawady United | 4–2 | Phoenix | Aung San Stadium |
| 16:00 MMT | Thiha Zaw 17'; Naing Lin Oo 41'; Sebestian 44' (pen.); Keith Martu Nah 75' | | Htet Phyo Wai 51', 90' |

| 17 May 2017 | Magwe | 4–0 | Pong Gan | Aung San Stadium |
| 16:00 MMT | Adulfees Adusalam 17', 48'; Naing Naing Kyaw 65'; Zin Min Tun 75' |

| 17 May 2017 | Shan United | 6–0 | City Stars | Thuwunna Stadium |
| 16:00 MMT | Han Kyung-In 5', 47', 71' (pen.); Dway Ko Ko Chit 60'; Christopher Chizoba 88', 90' (pen.) |

| 18 May 2017 | Southern Myanmar | 3–1 | Nay Pyi Taw | Thuwunna Stadium |
| 16:00 MMT | Kaung Sithu 30', 90+2' (pen.); Simoen Hristov 70' | | Bamba 24' |

| 18 May 2017 | Mahar United | 0–5 | Yadanarbon | Aung San Stadium |
| | | | Kyaw Thet Oo 2'; Sithu Aung 37'; Aung Thu 52'; Win Naing Soe 68'; Thein Than Win 81' |

=== Quarterfinal ===
| 20 September 2017 | Magwe | 2–3 | Shan United | Thuwunna Stadium |
| | Adulsalam 45'; Maung Maung Soe 65' | | Christopher Chizoba 52'; Maximum 68'; Dway Ko Ko Chit 90+2' |

| 20 September 2017 | Hantharwady United | 0–4 | Yangon United | Aung San Stadium |
| 16:00 MMT | | | Kyaw Ko Ko 24', 30', 88'; Cezar 54' |

| 21 September 2017 | Rakhine United | 0–2 | Ayeyawady United | Aung San Stadium |
| | | | Naing Lin Oo 28'; Keith Martu Nah 90+3' |

| 21 September 2017 | Southern Myanmar | 0–4 | Yadanarbon | Thuwunna Stadium |
| 16:00 MMT | | | Aung Thu 10', 61'; Patrick 12', 22' |

=== Semifinal ===
==== First leg ====
| 29 September 2017 | Shan United | 1–1 | Ayeyawady United | Taunggyi Stadium |
| 15:30 | Dway Ko Ko Chit 9' | | Min Min Thu 54' |

| 30 September 2017 | Yangon United | 1–0 | Yadanarbon | Thuwunna Stadium |
| 17:00 MMT | Cezar 69' |

==== Second leg ====
| 18 October 2017 | Ayeyawady United | 2–2 | Shan United | Ayar Stadium |
| 15:30 MMT | Keith Martu Nah 2'; Min Min Thu 90+5' | | Yan Naing Oo 79'; Han Kyung-In 90' |

| 19 October 2017 | Yadanarbon | 0–0 | Yangon United | Mandalarrthiri Stadium |
| 16:00 MMT |

=== Final ===
| 25 October 2017 | Shan United | 2–1 | Yangon United | Aung San Stadium, Yangon |
| 15:00 MST | Maximum 45'; Christopher Chizoba 55' | | César 59' | Stadium: Bogyoke Aung San Stadium; Attendance: 10,000; Referee: (Myanmar) Mr. Khin Maung Win |

== Top goalscorers ==
| Rank | Player | Club | Goals |
|---|---|---|---|
| 1 | Samuel | Mahar United | 4 |
| 2 | Han Kyung-In | Shan United | 4 |
| 3 | Mercio Gomez | Hantharwady United | 3 |
| 4 | Kyaw Ko Ko | Yangon United | 3 |
| 5 | Adusalam | Magwe | 3 |
| 6 | Aung Thu | Yadanarbon | 3 |

== Sponsor ==
=== Official Main Sponsor ===
- Myanmar Brewery Ltd

=== Official Partner ===
- AYA Bank

=== Media Broadcasting ===
- MWD

=== Co-sponsor ===
- AYA Myanmar Insurance
- M-150
- Thanlwin Private School
- Sumitomo Electric
