= 2017 Rakhine United F.C. season =

Football club based in Rakhine State, Burma

Rakhine United
2017 season
- Owner: (Myanmar) U Zaw Min Thein
- Manager: (Myanmar) U Soe Thein
- Stadium: Wai Thar Li Stadium

Rakhine United FC (Burmese: ရခိုင်ယူနိုက်တက် ဘောလုံးအသင်း) Is a professional football club based in Rakhine State. It plays in the Myanmar National League.

== History ==
Previously known as the Rakhine United Football Club, the club changed its name to Rakhapura United F.C." in December 2010. The team's home stadium is Waytharli Yinpyin, located in Sittwe Township (Rakhine State).

Last season, Rakhapura United F.C. stood in the 10th position and had its biggest win (7-2) in the General Aung San Cup against Manaw Myay.

== Sponsorship ==
Period	Sportswear	Sponsor
2017	Made by Club	(Myanmar) Mateo Kadriu

== Club ==
=== Coaching staff ===
Position	Staff
Manager	(Myanmar) U Soe Thein
Assistant Manager	(Myanmar) U Maung Maung Myint
Assistant Manager	(Myanmar) U Win Tin
Goalkeeper Coach	(Myanmar) U Aye Thar
Fitness Coach	(Myanmar) U Nan Da Kyaw

Source: Rakhine United FC

=== Other information ===
Owner	(Myanmar) U Zaw Min Thein
C.E.O	(Myanmar) U Ye Naing Oo
Finance Officer	(Myanmar) Daw Nwe Ni Naing
Marketing Officer	(Myanmar) U Myo Min Naing
Admin Assistance	(Myanmar) U Lin Zaw Oo
Media Officer	(Myanmar) U Win Myint Htay
Ground (capacity and dimensions)	Wai Thar Li Stadium (7,000 / 103x67 metres)
Training Ground	Kyaikkasan Ground

== 2017 players squad ==
Note: Flags indicate national team as defined under FIFA eligibility rules; some limited exceptions apply. Players may hold more than one non-FIFA nationality.

No.	Pos.	Nation	Player
1	GK	MYA	Soe Arkar
3	DF	MYA	Thet Lwin
5	FW	MYA	Nyein Tayzar Win
6	MF	MYA	Ye Win Hlaing
7	MF	MYA	Zaw Zaw Naing
8	MF	MYA	Naing Lin Tun Kyaw
9	FW	MYA	Dway Ko Ko Chit
10	FW	NGR	Sunday Mathew
11	FW	MYA	Tay Nyain Min
12	MF	TOG	Agarawa
13	GK	MYA	Tay Zar Aung
14	MF	MYA	Hla Aye Htwe
15	MF	MYA	Kaung Myat Han

No.	Pos.	Nation	Player
16	GK	MYA	Chan Nyein Kyaw
17	DF	MYA	Thet Shine Naung
18	MF	MYA	Myint Naing
19	MF	MYA	Nyein Chan 1
20	DF	MYA	Zaw Win
21	DF	MYA	Nyein Chan 2
22	FW	MYA	Kaung Myat Kyaw
23	MF	MYA	Saw Thet Kyaw Oo
24	DF	MYA	Shwe Win Tun
26	DF	NGR	Clifford
29	DF	MYA	Thet Tun Aung
