= 2019 General Aung San Shield =

2019 Bogyoke Aung San Shield
MFF Cup

Tournament details
- Country: Myanmar
- City: Yangon
- Venue: Aung San Stadium
- Dates: 13 March - 24 September 2019
- Teams: 20

Final positions
- Champions: Yangon United (3rd title)
- Runners-up: Shan United

Tournament statistics
- Matches played: 21
- Goals scored: 65 (3.1 per match)
- Top goal scorer: Sylla Sekou (4 goals)

The 2019 General Aung San Shield (Burmese: Bogyoke Aung San Shield) was the fifth season of Myanmar knockout football competition. The tournament is organized by the Myanmar Football Federation. This cup succeeded the Myanmar Football Federation Cup.

== Results ==
=== Preliminary round ===
Preliminary round consists of two rounds for teams currently playing in the Regional League Division 1 level. The First round was held 13 March 2019.

==== First round ====
13 March 2019	Kachin United	0–2	Myawady	Yangon
16:00 MMT			Thet Paing Ko 40'; Hla Myo Khaing 72'	Stadium: Thuwunna Stadium

13 March 2019	Royal Thanlyin	2–4	University	Yangon
16:00 MMT	Sai Zsai Mon 3', 18'		Pyae Phyo Kyaw 22', 64' (pen.); Ye Min Oo 28'; La Pyae Hein 87'	Stadium: Padonmar Stadium

13 March 2019	ISPE	2–1	Chin United	Yangon
16:00 MMT	Pyae Maung Maung 22'; Khin Kyaw Win 36'		Doe Sackie 44'	Stadium: Aung San Stadium; Referee: Zaw Khaing

14 March 2019	Mawyawadi	0–4	Dagon	Yangon
16:00 MMT			Zama Salif 30'; Myo Min Zaw 36'; Aung Khine Tun 73'; Zwe Khant 77'	Stadium: Thuwunna Stadium

14 March 2019	Chinland	0–1	Silver Stars	Yangon
16:00 MMT			Zaw Zaw Tun 88'	Stadium: Aung San Stadium

==== Second round ====
1 May 2019	Ayeyawady United	1–2 (a.e.t.)	Yadanarbon	Yangon
16:00 MMT	Thiha Zaw 69'		Win Naing Soe 63', 117'	Stadium: Aung San Stadium,

1 May 2019	University	1–5	Hanthawady United	Yangon
16:00 MMT	Thant Zin 51'		Hein Htet Aung 31'; Pooda 64', 81'; Aung Myo Thura 75', 84'	Stadium: Padonmar Stadium

8 May 2019	Magwe	3–0	ISPE	Yangon
16:00 MMT	Naing Naing Kyaw 3'; Aung Myint Tun 80'; Aung Zaw Myint 90+2'			Stadium: Aung San Stadium

8 May 2019	Rakhine United	2–2 (a.e.t.) (4–3 p)	Zwekapin United	Yangon
16:00 MMT	Ti Nyein Minn 27'; Zaw Thein Win 81'		Sitt Mone 31'; Zon Moe Aung 58'	Stadium: Thuwunna Stadium

8 May 2019	Shan United	2–0	Myawady	Yangon
16:00 MMT	Dway Ko Ko Chit 14'; Shwe Ko 80'			Stadium: Padonmar Stadium

15 May 2019	Dagon	0–1	Sagaing United	Yangon
16:00 MMT			Thant Zaw Win 41'	Stadium: Aung San Stadium

15 May 2019	Southern Myanmar	4-0	Silver Stars	Yangon
16:00 MMT	Thura Min Naing 21'; Than Zaw Myo 35'; Sithu Than Soe 43'; Shine Thura 61'			Stadium: Padonmar Stadium

=== Quarter-final ===
19 May 2019	Shan United	2–1	Hanthawady United	Yangon
16:00 MMT	Suan Lam Mang 53'; Maximum 90+3'		Yan Naing Aung 4'	Stadium: Aung San Stadium

19 May 2019	Magwe	1–4	Rakhine United	Yangon
16:00 MMT	Soe Lwin Lwin 43'		Soe Myat Thu 54' (o.g); Samuel 63'; Zaw Thein Win 67'; Zaw Zaw Naing 84'	Stadium: Thuwunna Stadium

20 May 2019	Southern Myanmar	0–0 (a.e.t.) (4–5 p)	Yangon United	Yangon
16:00 MMT				Stadium: Thuwunna Stadium; Referee: U Tin Naing Htwe

20 May 2019	Yadanarbon	0–1	Sagaing United	Yangon
16:00 MMT			Aung Hlaing Win 68'	Stadium: Aung San Stadium

=== Semi-final ===
==== First leg ====
25 May 2019	Shan United	4–0	Rakhine United	Yangon
16:00 MMT	Emmanuel 10'; Zin Min Tun 18', 70'; Suan Lam Mang 58'			Stadium: Thuwunna Stadium

25 May 2019	Sagaing United	1–1	Yangon United	Monywa
16:00 MMT	Donald Bissa 45+2' (pen.)		Aee Soe 37'	Stadium: Monywa Stadium

==== Second leg ====
1 June 2019	Rakhine United	1–0	Shan United	Sittwe
15:30 MMT	Samuel 26'			Stadium: Waithali Stadium

2 June 2019	Yangon United	3–1	Sagaing United	Yangon
15:30 MMT	Maung Maung Lwin 12'; Sekou Sylla 84', 90+3'		Thant Zin Win 71'	Stadium: Y.U.S.C Stadium

=== Final ===
24 September 2019	Shan United	3–4 (a.e.t.)	Yangon United	Yangon
18:00 MMT	Zin Min Tun 8'; Zwe Thet Paing 62'; Emmanuel 111'		Sylla Sekou 51', 116'; Soe Min Naing 90+1'; Min Kyaw Khant 103'	Stadium: Thuwunna Stadium; Attendance: 11,345

== Top goalscorers ==
Rank	Player	Club	Goals
1	(Ivory Coast) Frederic Pooda	Hanthawaddy United	2
1	(Myanmar) Aung Myo Thura	Hanthawaddy United	2
1	(Myanmar) Win Naing Soe	Yadanarbon	2
1	(Myanmar) Suan Lam Mang	Shan United	2
1	(Myanmar) Zin Min Tun	Shan United	2
1	(Nigeria) Samuel	Rakhine United	2
1	(Guinea) Sekou Sylla	Yangon United	2

== Sponsor ==
=== Official Main Sponsor ===
- Myanmar Brewery Ltd

=== Official Partner ===
- AYA Bank

=== Media Broadcasting ===
- MWD

=== FB Partner ===
- My Sports

=== Co-sponsor ===
- 100plus
- AYA Myanmar Insurance
- M-150
- Canon
- FBT
- Genius Sports
- JCB Card
- Molten
- Z-Tech Solution

== See also ==
- Myanmar National League
- Myanmar National League Cup
- MNL-2
- Myanmar Women League
