= Myanmar National League Cup =

- Organiser(s): MFF
- Founded: 2009; 17 years ago
- Region: Myanmar
- Teams: 22
- Qualifier for: AFC Challenge League; ASEAN Club Championship
- Related competitions: M League; M League 2
- Current champions: Yangon United
- Most championships: Yangon United (4 titles)
- 2026-27

The Myanmar National League Cup is the annual football tournament of the Myanmar National League (MNL) organized by the Myanmar Football Federation.

== Results ==
Year	Winner	Score	Runner-up	Venue	Cup name
2009	(Myanmar) Yadanabon	2–2 (4–1)	(Myanmar) Yangon United	Thuwunna Stadium	MNL Cup
2010	(Myanmar) Okktha United	3–1	Southern Myanmar	Thuwunna Stadium	MFF Cup
2011	(Myanmar) Yangon United	5–0	(Myanmar) Naypyidaw	Thuwunna Stadium	2011
2012	(Myanmar) Ayeyawady United	1–0	(Myanmar) Kanbawza	Thuwunna Stadium	2012
2013	(Myanmar) Kanbawza	1–0	(Myanmar) Magwe	Thuwunna Stadium	MFF Cup
2014	(Myanmar) Ayeyawady United	2–0	(Myanmar) Nay Pyi Taw	Thuwunna Stadium	2014
2015	(Myanmar) Ayeyawady United	2–1	(Myanmar) Yadanarbon F.C.	Aung San Stadium	2015
2016	(Myanmar) Magwe	2–1	(Myanmar) Yangon United	Aung San Stadium	GASS
2017	(Myanmar) Shan United	2–1	(Myanmar) Yangon United	Aung San Stadium	GASS
2018	(Myanmar) Yangon United	2–1	(Myanmar) Hanthawady United	Aung San Stadium	GASS
2019	(Myanmar) Yangon United	4–3	(Myanmar) Shan United	Aung San Stadium	GASS
2024	(Myanmar) Shan United	1–0	(Myanmar) Yangon United	Thuwunna Stadium	MNL League Cup
2025	(Myanmar) Yangon United	1–0	(Myanmar) Shan United	Thuwunna Stadium	MNL League Cup
2026-27	(Myanmar)		(Myanmar)	Thuwunna Stadium	2026-27

== Awards ==
=== Top scorers ===
Year	Nation	Player	Club	Goals
2009	(Myanmar)	Yan Paing	Yadanabon	6
2015	(North Macedonia)	Riste Naumov	Ayeyawady United	8
2016	(Myanmar)	Win Naing Soe	Yadanabon	6
2017	(Nigeria)	Maduabuckkwu Samuel	Mahar United	4
2018	(Myanmar)	Maung Maung Soe	Magwe	4
2019	(Ivory Coast)	Frederic Pooda	Hanthawaddy United	2
2019	(Myanmar)	Aung Myo Thura	Hanthawaddy United	2
2019	(Myanmar)	Win Naing Soe	Yadanarbon	2
2019	(Myanmar)	Suan Lam Mang	Shan United	2
2019	(Myanmar)	Zin Min Tun	Shan United	2
2019	(Nigeria)	Samuel	Rakhine United	2
2019	(Guinea)	Sekou Sylla	Yangon United	2
2024	(Myanmar)	Kyaw Ko Ko	Rakhine United	9
2025	(Myanmar)	Yan Kyaw Htwe	Dagon Star United	7
2026-27				

== Champions ==
Club	Champions
Yangon United	4 (2011, 2018, 2019, 2025)
Ayeyawady United	3 (2012, 2014, 2015)
Shan United (former Kanbawza)	3 (2013, 2017, 2024)
Yadanabon	1 (2009)
Hanthawady United	1 (2010)
Magwe	1 (2016)

== See also ==
- General Aung San Shield
