= 2016 Rakhine United F.C. season =

Rakhine United
2016 season
- Owner: (Myanmar) U Zaw Min Thein
- Manager: (Myanmar) U Aung Zaw Myo
- Stadium: Wai Thar Li Stadium
- Myanmar National League: 10th
- Top goalscorer: League: Mathew Sunday Idoko; All: Mathew Sunday Idoko

Rakhine United FC (Burmese: ရခိုင်ယူနိုက်တက် ဘောလုံးအသင်း) Football Club is a professional football club based in Rakhine State that plays in the Myanmar National League. At the end of the 2016 season, Rakhapura United FC finished in 10th position. Rakhine United FC's biggest win was a 7–2 victory in General Aung San Cup against Manaw Myay.

== Sponsorship ==
Period	Sportswear	Sponsor
2016	(Thailand) Grandsport	(Myanmar) Up Energy drink

== Club ==
=== Coaching staff ===
Position	Staff
Manager	(Myanmar) U Aung Zaw Myo
Assistant Manager	(Myanmar) U Maung Maung Myint
Assistant Manager	(Myanmar) U Nyunt Win
Assistant Manager	(Myanmar) U Kyaing Than
Goalkeeper Coach	(Myanmar) U Aye Thar
Fitness Coach	(Myanmar) U Nan Da Kyaw
Youth Team Head Coach	(Myanmar) U Nan Da Kyaw

Source: Rakhine United FC

=== Other information ===
Owner	(Myanmar) U Zaw Min Thein
C.E.O	(Myanmar) U Ye Naing Oo
Finance Officer	(Myanmar) Daw Nwe Ni Naing
Marketing Officer	(Myanmar) U Myo Min Naing
Admin Assistance	(Myanmar) U Lin Zaw Oo
Media Officer	(Myanmar) U Thet Htoo Naing Oo
Ground (capacity and dimensions)	Wai Thar Li Stadium (32,000 / 103x67 metres)
Training Ground	Kyaikkasan Ground

== Squad information ==
=== First team squad ===
As of 15 August 2015.

Squad No.	Name	Nationality	Position(s)	Date of birth (age)
Goalkeepers
1	Thurakoko(1)	(Myanmar)	GK	
18	Soe Moe Kyaw	(Myanmar)	GK	
Defenders
2	Kyaw Naing Myint	(Myanmar)	RB	
3	Min Ko Thu	(Myanmar)	CB / DM	
4	Aung Thu Win	(Myanmar)	LB	
6	Nyan Lin Htet	(Myanmar)	CB	
12	Wai Phyo Lwin	(Myanmar)	CB / RB	
13	Pyae Phyo Ko Ko	(Myanmar)	LB	
21	Si Thu Than Soe	(Myanmar)	CB / RB	
23	Thi Ha Aung	(Myanmar)	LB	
24	Saw Win Htoo	(Myanmar)	CB	
25	Bernard Achaw	(Ghana)	CB	
Midfielders
5	Tun Tun Oo	(Myanmar)	CM / DM	
7	Naing Naing Kyaw	(Myanmar)	RW	
11	Phyo Wai	(Myanmar)	LW / RW	
14	Saw Sein Ba Myint	(Myanmar)	RW	
16	Myat Kyaw Moe Oo	(Myanmar)	CM / AM	
17	Thurakoko(2)	(Myanmar)	CM / AM	
20	Aung Khine Tun	(Myanmar)	CM / AM	
Strikers
9	Aung Soe Moe (captain)	(Myanmar)	CF / RW	
19	Nyi Nyi Naing	(Myanmar)	CF	
29	Lar Ceu Luai	(Myanmar)	CF	

== Transfer ==
=== In ===
- Nyi Nyi Min – from Chin United
- Chan Nyein Kyaw – from Ayeyawady United
- Dway Ko Ko Chit – from Yadanarbon FC
- Naing Lin Tun Kyaw – from Zwekapin United
- Saw Kyaw Thet Oo – from Zwekapin United
- Kyaw Kyaw Htet – from Zeya Shwe Myay
- Tay Zar Aung – from Yangon United

=== Out ===
- Min Ko Thu – to Hantharwady United
- Thura Ko Ko – to Hantharwady United
- Thiha Aung – to Hantharwady United
- Myat Kyaw Moe Oo – to Hantharwady United
- Sithu Than Soe – to Hantharwady United
- Pyi Moe – to Zeyar Shwe Myay FC
- Aung Soe Moe – to Magwe
- Naing Naing Kyaw – to Magwe
- Pyae Phyo Ko Ko – to Zeyar Shwe Myay FC
- Wai Phyo Lwin – to Zeyar Shwe Myay FC
