= Yan Aung Lin =

Burmese footballer

Personal information
- Full name: Yan Aung Lin
- Date of birth: 6 March 1993 (age 33)
- Place of birth: Yangon, Myanmar
- Height: 1.88 m (6 ft 2 in)
- Position: Goalkeeper

Team information
- Current team: Yadanarbon FC
- Number: 1

Senior career*
Years	Team	Apps	(Gls)
2011–2015	Hantharwady United	20	(0)
2015–2017	Yadanarbon FC	33	(0)
2018	Zwegapin United	2	(0)
2019	Dagon FC	18	(0)

International career^{‡}
2014–	Myanmar	1	(0)
- * Club domestic league appearances and goals as of 25 October 2023 ‡ National team caps and goals as of 1 September 2016

Yan Aung Lin (Burmese: ရန်အောင်လင်း; born 3 March 1993) is a footballer from Burma, and a goalkeeper for Myanmar national football team and the Myanmar U-22 football team. In November 2015, he transferred to Yadanarbon FC.

== Honours ==
- Champion : 2016 Myanmar National League
