= Min Min Thu =

Burmese footballer

Personal information
- Full name: Min Min Thu
- Date of birth: 30 March 1988 (age 38)
- Position: Midfielder

Senior career*
| Years | Team | Apps | (Gls) |
| 2009–2018 | Ayeyawady United | | |

International career^{‡}
| 2011 | Myanmar U23 | 5 | (2) |
| 2011– | Myanmar | 23 | (3) |
Medal record
Men's football
Representing Myanmar
Philippine Peace Cup
| Gold medal – first place | 2014 Philippines |
- * Club domestic league appearances and goals ‡ National team caps and goals as of 31 August 2017

Min Min Thu (Burmese: မင်းမင်းသူ; born 30 March 1988) is a Burmese footballer and a midfielder for Myanmar national football team. He is the bronze medalist with Myanmar U23 in 2011 SEA Games.

He currently plays for Ayeyawady United in Myanmar National League. In March 2016, The Disciplinary Committee imposed a two-match suspension and a fine of two hundred thousand each on Keith and Min Min Thu, who were shown a red card in the match between the Ayeyawady United and Yadanarbon F.C. in the Myanmar National League (12) match.

== International goals ==
Scores and results are list Myanmar's goal tally first.

| No. | Date | Venue | Opponent | Score | Result | Competition |
|---|---|---|---|---|---|---|
| 1. | 6 September 2014 | Rizal Memorial Stadium, Manila, Philippines | Philippines | 2–2 | 3–2 | 2014 Philippine Peace Cup |
| 2. | 16 October 2014 | New Laos National Stadium, Vientiane, Laos | Brunei | 1–0 | 3–1 | 2014 AFF Championship qualification |
| 3. | 13 June 2017 | Estádio Campo Desportivo, Taipa, Macau | Macau | 4–0 | 4–0 | 2019 AFC Asian Cup qualification |

== Honours ==
=== National team ===
- Philippine Peace Cup (1): 2014

=== Club ===
Ayeyawady United

- MFF Cup (2): 2012, 2014
- 2015 General Aung San Shield:
