= Eze Chika Philip =

Nigerian footballer

Personal information
- Date of birth: 24 December 1993
- Place of birth: Nigeria
- Height: 1.72 m (5 ft 8 in)
- Position: Forward

Senior career*
Years	Team	Apps	(Gls)
2015	Horizon F.C.		
2016	Southern Myanmar F.C.		
2019-	Kamakura International FC		
- * Club domestic league appearances and goals

Eze Chika Philip (born 24 December 1993) is a footballer from Nigeria who last played for Southern Myanmar F.C. of the Myanmar National League.

== Myanmar ==
Without a club after assisting Horizon F.C. in their quest for promotion in 2015, Philip was picked up by Southern Myanmar F.C. in the hopes of revivifying their lineup for the second half of the 2016 Myanmar National League.
