= Andrey Coutinho =

Brazilian footballer (born 1990)

Personal information
- Full name: Andrey Marcel Ferreira Coutinho
- Date of birth: January 12, 1990 (age 36)
- Place of birth: Brazil
- Height: 1.75 m (5 ft 9 in)
- Position: Midfielder

Team information
- Current team: Roi Et PB United
- Number: 20

Senior career*
Years	Team	Apps	(Gls)
2011	Paysandu	2	(1)
2012	Rakhine United		
2013–2014	Santa Cruz-PA		
2014	Taubaté-SP	1	(0)
2015	Young Africans		
2016	Rakhine United	11	(7)
2017	Nongbua Pitchaya	0	(0)
2019	Al Sahel	0	(0)
2020	Ayutthaya United	4	(0)
2020–2021	Udon United	20	(3)
2021–2022	Lampang	41	(4)
2023	Samut Sakhon City	12	(3)
2023	Udon United	21	(3)
2024-	Roi Et PB United	10	(1)
- * Club domestic league appearances and goals as of 19 March 2023

Andrey Marcel Ferreira Coutinho (born January 12, 1990) is a Brazilian footballer.

== Honours ==
Young Africans

- Tanzanian Premier League: 2014–15
