= Chit Su Moe =

Burmese footballer

Personal information
- Full name: Chit Su Moe
- Date of birth: 4 December 1994 (age 31)
- Place of birth: Myanmar
- Height: 1.75 m (5 ft 9 in)
- Position: Defensive midfielder

Senior career*
Years	Team	Apps	(Gls)
2014–2016	Chin United	23	(3)
2017–2018	Shan United	16	(1)
2019	Rakhine United	8	(1)
2020	Chin United	33	(0)

International career
2015–2017	Myanmar U23	2	(0)
2014–2017	Myanmar	5	(0)
- * Club domestic league appearances and goals

Chit Su Moe (born 4 December 1994) is a Burmese former professional footballer who played as a defensive midfielder for the Myanmar national football team.
