= Zin Min Tun =

Burmese footballer

Personal information
- Full name: Zin Min Tun
- Date of birth: 12 June 1993 (age 33)
- Place of birth: Tada-U, Mandalay, Myanmar
- Height: 1.80 m (5 ft 11 in)
- Position: Forward

Team information
- Current team: Rakhine United F.C.
- Number: 9

Senior career*
| Years | Team | Apps | (Gls) |
| 2014–2016 | Yadanabon | | |
| 2016–2023 | Shan United | 60 | (18) |
| 2023–2025 | Hanthawady United | 12 | (8) |

International career
| 2015– | Myanmar | 12 | (0) |
- * Club domestic league appearances and goals

Zin Min Tun (Burmese: ဇင်မင်းထွန်း; born 12 June 1993) is a Burmese professional footballer who plays for Rakhine United F.C. and the Myanmar national football team. He made his national team debut on 30 March 2015 against Indonesia.

== International ==
As of match played 7 November 2019

Appearances and goals by year
| National team | Year | Apps | Goals | Assists |
|---|---|---|---|---|
| Myanmar | 2015 | 1 | 0 | 0 |
| Myanmar | 2017 | 2 | 0 | 1 |
| Myanmar | 2018 | 4 | 0 | 2 |
| Myanmar | 2019 | 5 | 0 | 0 |
| Total | | 12 | 0 | 3 |

== Honours ==
=== Club ===
Shan United

- Myanmar National League
  - Winners (2): 2017, 2019
  - Runners-up (1): 2018
- General Aung San Shield
  - Champions (1): 2017
  - Runners-up (1): 2019
