= Tin Win Aung =

Burmese professional footballer

Personal information
- Full name: Tin Win Aung
- Date of birth: 14 April 1992 (age 34)
- Place of birth: Bilin, Myanmar
- Height: 1.66 m (5 ft 5 1/2 in)
- Position: Midfielder

Team information
- Current team: Ayeyawady United
- Number: 6

Senior career*
Years	Team	Apps	(Gls)
2009–2011	Yangon	7	(0)
2011–2014	Zwekapin United	51	(4)
2014–2015	Yadanarbon	1	(0)
2015–2016	Zwekapin United	21	(1)
2017–2019	Shan United	47	(0)
2019–	Ayeyawady United	17	(1)

International career^{‡}
2014–	Myanmar	22	(1)
- * Club domestic league appearances and goals as of 6 July 2022 ‡ National team caps and goals as of 15 June 2021

Tin Win Aung (born 14 April 1992) is a Burmese professional footballer who plays as a midfielder.

== International career ==
=== International goals ===
Scores and results list Myanmar's goal tally first.

No	Date	Venue	Opponent	Score	Result	Competition
1.	3 September 2014	Rizal Memorial Stadium, Manila, Philippines	Palestine	2–0	4–1	Friendly
