= 2010 Myanmar National League =

Myanmar National League
- Season: 2010
- Champions: Yadanabon
- AFC President's Cup: Yadanabon

The 2010 MNL Grand Royal is the Myanmar National League's first full regular season. The MNL was founded in 2009, and two separate cup competitions were held. Mandalay-based Yadanabon FC won both competitions.

== League table ==
The season opener was between the champion Yadanarbon F.C. and Zeya Shwe Myay on 13 March 2010. The title deciding match was also between the champion Yadanabon and Zeya Shwe Myay on 9 November 2010 and Yadanabon won the match 2–1. The last match of the 2010 season was played on 10 November 2010 between Yangon United F.C. and Okkthar United ending in a 3–3 draw. Below is the league table for 2010 season.

| Pos | Team | Pld | W | D | L | GF | GA | GD | Pts | Qualification |
|---|---|---|---|---|---|---|---|---|---|---|
| 1 | Yadanarbon | 20 | 13 | 5 | 2 | 44 | 16 | +28 | 44 | 2011 AFC President's Cup |
| 2 | Zeya Shwe Myay | 20 | 13 | 5 | 2 | 41 | 18 | +23 | 44 | |
| 3 | Yangon United FC | 20 | 11 | 6 | 3 | 44 | 13 | +31 | 39 | |
| 4 | Kanbawza | 20 | 11 | 5 | 4 | 28 | 11 | +17 | 38 | |
| 5 | Magway | 20 | 10 | 2 | 8 | 37 | 36 | +1 | 32 | |
| 6 | Okkthar United | 20 | 9 | 3 | 8 | 34 | 34 | 0 | 30 | |
| 7 | Southern Myanmar United | 20 | 6 | 7 | 7 | 30 | 27 | +3 | 25 | |
| 8 | Delta United | 20 | 7 | 3 | 10 | 28 | 34 | −6 | 24 | |
| 9 | Manaw Myay | 20 | 6 | 1 | 13 | 24 | 50 | −26 | 19 | |
| 10 | Nay Pyi Daw | 20 | 3 | 3 | 14 | 25 | 36 | −11 | 12 | |
| 11 | Zwegabin United | 20 | 1 | 0 | 19 | 13 | 73 | −60 | 3 | |

Source: rsssf.com

== Top scorers ==
| No | Player | Club | Goals |
|---|---|---|---|
| 1 | (Cameroon) Jean-Roger Lappé-Lappé | Okkthar United | 16 |
| 2 | (Ivory Coast) Assalé Molo Hilaire | Yadanarbon | 11 |
| 3 | Victor | Zeya Shwe Myay | 10 |
| 4 | (Myanmar) Kyaw Zin Win | Zeya Shwe Myay | 9 |
| 5 | (Cameroon) Abolaji Larry Samuel | Magway | 9 |
