= Dway Ko Ko Chit =

Burmese footballer (born 1993)

Personal information
- Full name: Dway Ko Ko Chit
- Date of birth: 23 June 1993 (age 33)
- Place of birth: Amarapura, Mandalay, Myanmar
- Height: 1.79 m (5 ft 10 1/2 in)
- Position: Striker

Team information
- Current team: Hanthawaddy United

Senior career*
Years	Team	Apps	(Gls)
2014–2015	Yadanarbon FC	2	(0)
2016–2017	Rakhine United FC	33	(6)
2017–2020	Shan United FC	50	(24)
2021–	Hanthawaddy United	17	(0)

International career^{‡}
2017–	Myanmar	5	(0)
- * Club domestic league appearances and goals as of 16 July 2023 ‡ National team caps and goals as of 5 October 2017

Dway Ko Ko Chit (Burmese: ဒွေးကိုကိုချစ်; born 23 June 1993) is a Burmese footballer who plays a striker for Hanthawaddy United.

== Honours ==
=== Club ===
Shan United

- Myanmar National League
  - Winners (2): 2017, 2019
  - Runners-up (1): 2018
- General Aung San Shield
  - Champions (1): 2017
  - Runners-up (1): 2019
