= Sithu Aung =

Burmese footballer

Personal information
- Full name: Sithu Aung
- Date of birth: 16 November 1996 (age 29)
- Place of birth: Yangon, Myanmar
- Height: 1.72 m (5 ft 7 1/2 in)
- Positions: Left winger; left back

Team information
- Current team: Rakhine United F.C.
- Number: 77

Youth career
- 2009–2012: Yangon United Academy

Senior career*
Years	Team	Apps	(Gls)
2012–2014	Yangon United	59	(2)
2014–2022	Yadanarbon	139	(18)
2019	→ Chonburi (loan)	12	(2)
2022–2023	Shan United	6	(4)
2023	Ayutthaya United	17	(2)
2024	Samut Prakan City	10	(2)
2024–2025	Rakhine United		
2025	Police Tero	8	(0)
2025–	Rakhine United		

International career^{‡}
2013–2016	Myanmar U19	5	(1)
2013–2019	Myanmar U23	27	(7)
2013–	Myanmar	44	(5)
Medal record
Myanmar
SEA Games
Silver medal – second place	Singapore 2015	Team
- * Club domestic league appearances and goals as of 12 June 2025 ‡ National team caps and goals as of 16 September 2023

Sithu Aung (Burmese: စည်သူအောင်; also spelled Si Thu Aung; born 16 November 1996) is a Burmese professional footballer who plays as left winger for Myanmar national football team. He has played much of his career as a left back. Aged 13, Sithu Aung joined the youth team of Yangon United, for whom he made his professional debut at the age of 16.

== Club statistics ==
Club	Year	Apps	Goals	Assists
Yangon United	2012	17	0	1
Yangon United	2013	22	1	2
Yangon United	2014	20	1	3
Yadanarbon	2015	24	2	3
Yadanarbon	2016	22	0	5
Yadanarbon	2017	21	2	6
Yadanarbon	2018	21	10	7
Yadanarbon	2019	2	4	2
Yadanarbon	2020	17	0	3
Chonburi (loan)	2019	14	2	2
Shan United	2022	6	4	1
Ayutthaya United	2023	17	2	4
Chainat United	2023	4	0	0

== International ==
As of match played 6 October 2023

Appearances and goals by year
National team	Year	Apps	Goals
Myanmar	2014	6	0
Myanmar	2015	2	0
Myanmar	2017	6	3
Myanmar	2018	7	1
Myanmar	2019	7	1
Myanmar	2021	6	0
Myanmar	2022	6	0
Myanmar	2023	4	0

=== International career ===
In 2015 SEA Games, he won a silver medal, scoring a total of 5 goals. He was also chosen for U-23 Sea Games in 2017 and 2019. In 2014, Sithu Aung played at the Peace Cup.

=== International goals ===
Scores and results list Myanmar's goal tally first.

No	Date	Venue	Opponent	Score	Result	Competition
1.	21 March 2017	Pakansari Stadium, Cibinong, Indonesia	Indonesia	3–1	3–1	Friendly
2.	13 June 2017	Estádio Campo Desportivo, Taipa, Macau	Macau	1–0	4–0	2019 AFC Asian Cup qualification
3.	13 June 2017	Estádio Campo Desportivo, Taipa, Macau	Macau	3–0	4–0	2019 AFC Asian Cup qualification
4.	12 November 2018	Mandalarthiri Stadium, Mandalay, Myanmar	Cambodia	3–1	4–1	2018 AFF Championship

== Honours ==
Myanmar

- Philippine Peace Cup: 2014

Myanmar U23

- Southeast Asian Games runner-up: 2015; third place: 2019

Yangon United

- Myanmar National League: 2013, 2015

Yadanarbon

- Myanmar National League: 2016

Shan United

- Myanmar National League: 2022

Individual

- MNL's best youth player: 2014
