= Keith Nah =

Liberian footballer (born 1995)

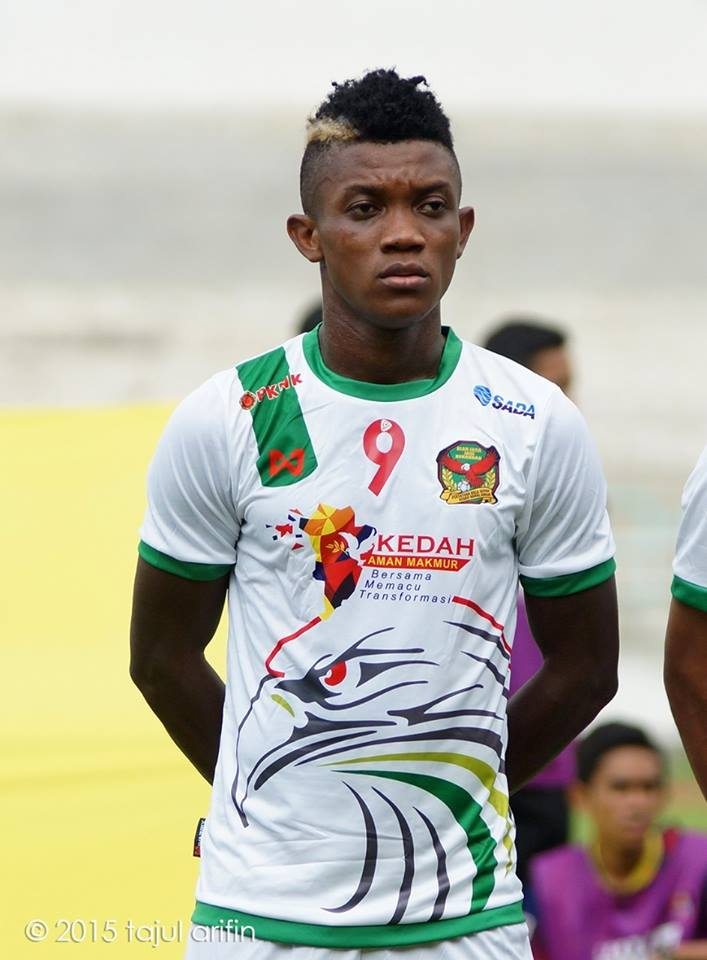
- Keith Nah in the line up for Kedah

Personal information
- Full name: Keith Martu Nah
- Date of birth: 20 June 1995 (age 31)
- Place of birth: Monrovia, Liberia
- Height: 1.78 m (5 ft 10 in)
- Position: Striker

Youth career
- 2012: LPRC Oilers

Senior career*
Years	Team	Apps	(Gls)
2013–2014	Chin United	66	(43)
2014–2015	Kedah FA	6	(3)
2015–2016	Yadanarbon	42	(36)
2016–2017	Ayeyawady United	21	(15)
2018	SD Ponferradina	0	(0)
2019	Ayeyawady United	18	(10)
2020–2021	Shan United FC	17	(7)
2021–2022	Police Tero	0	(0)
2022	→ Nakhon Pathom United (loan)	10	(5)
2023	Krabi	10	(1)

International career
- Liberia U20
2015	Liberia U23	1	(0)
- * Club domestic league appearances and goals as of 27 December 2023

Keith Nah (born 20 June 1995) is a Liberian footballer. He is a right-footed attacker, and is the first Liberian footballer to become top scorer in consecutive seasons in two different leagues in the same country. Considered one of the best players in the Myanmar National League, he is known for his dribbling, finishing, skill, pace, and ability to play with both feet. He is third all-time top scorer of MNL.

== Career ==
Keith Nah started his football career with club Vinton Professional playing in the Liberian third division. After playing several seasons with Vinton in the third league, he helped his side gain promotion to the Liberia Football second division league. Vinton finished as runners-up to league winners Green Pasture FC, and Nah won himself the second division Most Valuable Player (MVP) title.

After the end of the 2010–11 league season, Keith Nah signed with the Liberian "oil boys" LPRC OILERS for 2012. That year, he was invited to the Liberia football U20 national team for the African youth qualifier against the Niger U20 national team.

In 2012 Keith Nah was invited to join the Myanmar second division club Chin United. He had a successful trial with Chin and was given the opportunity to play in the 2013 Myanmar second division league. Chin finished that season in second place and was promoted to the top tier of Myanmar football (the Myanmar National League). He also finished the season as the highest goal scorer with eighteen league goals. In the 2014 Myanmar National League, Keith Nah scored twenty-five league goals and four FA Cup goals. He finished the season second on the goal-scoring chart, one goal less than top goal scorer Cezar Augusto who finished with twenty-six goals. Keith Nah received offers from clubs from Malaysia, Indonesia, Thailand and South Korea. He signed with Malaysia Premier League club Kedah FA.

Following his arrival in Malaysia, Keith Nah scored seven goals out of Kedah's nine pre-season matches, making him the top goal scorer in the team for the pre-season. On his league debut, February 6, 2015, Nah scored twice to help his side win their 2015 league opener with a 5–1 victory over Kuala Lumpur. He scored once more in his club's second league game against Kuantan, that ended with a 2–2 draw.

After returning to Myanmar, Keith Nah helped his club Yadanarbon to win the 2016 MNL and becoming a joint top goalscorer with Nigerian Myanmar Win Naing Soe and Nigeria Christopher Chizoba who all scored 16 goals in the season.

=== International career ===
Nah was featured in the Liberia under-20 national team in 2013 African U-20 Championship qualification. The young national side was drawn against Niger with the first encounter away to Niger from 20 April 2012. The corresponding fixture was on 6 May 2012 in Monrovia.

== Career statistics ==
As of 24 December 2018.

Club	League	Season	League		FA Cup		Other		Continental		Total	
Club	League	Season	Apps	Goals	Apps	Goals	Apps	Goals	Apps	Goals	Apps	Goals
Chin United	2013	MNL-2	37	18	0	0	0	0	-	-	37	18
Chin United	2014	MNL-1	29	25	0	4	0	0	-	-	29	29
Kedah FA	2015	Malaysia Premier League	6	3	2	0	0	0	-	-	6	3
Yadanarbon	2015–16	MNL	32	26	0	0	0	0	-	-	32	26
Ayeyawady United	2016–17	MNL	20	15	0	0	0	0	-	-	20	15
Ayeyawady United	2019–	MNL	14	0	0	0	0	0	-	-	14	8
Career total			0	0	0	0	0	0	0	0	0	0

== Honors ==
- Myanmar National League Top Scorer: 2016, 2017
