= Ayeyawady United F.C. =

Ayeyawady United ဧရာဝတီယူနိုက်တက် ဘောလုံးအသင်း
- Full name: Ayeyawady United Football Club
- Nicknames: The Fishermen (တံငါသည်များ)
- Founded: 2009; 17 years ago
- Ground: Ayar Stadium (Kyauk Tai Stadium)
- Capacity: 3,000
- Chairman: Zaw Win Shein
- Head coach: Nyi Nyi Tun
- League: Myanmar National League
- 2025–26: MFL, 8th of 12
| Home colours | Away colours |

Ayeyawady United Football Club (Burmese: ဧရာဝတီယူနိုက်တက် ဘောလုံးအသင်း) is a Burmese professional football club based in Pathein, Ayeyawady. The club was a founding member of the Myanmar National League (MNL) in 2009. The club finished tied at the last place in the inaugural cup competition, the MNL Cup 2009. The owners of former Delta United took over the club. Currently, a total of 26 entrepreneurs from Ayeyawady Region are running the club.

In 2011, Delta United was renamed as Ayeyawady United. The club was formerly owned by a tycoon Zaw Zaw.

The team signed Win Naing Tun, a footballer who was a Super-sub for the Myanmar national football team at the 2019 SEA Games for the 2020 season.

== First-team squad ==
As of October 2026

Note: Flags indicate national team as defined under FIFA eligibility rules; some limited exceptions apply. Players may hold more than one non-FIFA nationality.

| No. | Pos. | Nation | Player |
|---|---|---|---|
| 1 | GK | MYA | Aung Myint Myat |
| 3 | DF | MYA | Ye Win Aung |
| 4 | DF | MYA | Naing Bhone Htut |
| 6 | MF | MYA | Htun Lin Aung |
| 7 | MF | MYA | Yar Zar Soe |
| 10 | MF | MYA | Lu Min Chit |
| 13 | FW | MYA | Kaung Khant Lwin |
| 15 | DF | MYA | Thiha Aung |

| No. | Pos. | Nation | Player |
|---|---|---|---|
| 16 | MF | MYA | Kaung Thant |
| 19 | MF | MYA | Htun Htun |
| 20 | DF | MYA | Thet Paing Soe |
| 21 | MF | MYA | Thura Min Thant |
| 22 | DF | MYA | Aung Phyo Oo |
| 23 | MF | MYA | Kaung Khant Zaw |
| 24 | DF | MYA | Sai Kham Nyi |
| 26 | MF | MYA | Kyaw Htoo |
| 27 | DF | MYA | Mg Top |
| 29 | DF | MYA | Lin Pyae Aung |
| 30 | DF | MYA | Phone Pyae Sone Oo |
| 31 | MF | MYA | Hla Tun |

== Continental record ==
At the 2016 AFC Cup, Ayeyawady United played in Group H and lost 8-1 in their opening game against defending champion Johor Darul Ta'zim (JDT) with Thiha Zaw scoring the team's only goal that match. Their home game against JDT ended in a 1-2 loss, with the Malaysian team securing the top spot in the group in a comeback victory.

| Season | Competition | Round | Club | Home | Away | Aggregate |
|---|---|---|---|---|---|---|
| 2012 | AFC Cup | Group H | (Malaysia) Kelantan | 3–1 | 0–1 | 4th |
| 2012 | AFC Cup | Group H | (Indonesia) Arema | 0–3 | 1–1 | 4th |
| 2012 | AFC Cup | Group H | (Vietnam) Navibank Sài Gòn | 2–0 | 1–4 | 4th |
| 2013 | AFC Cup | Group G | (Malaysia) Kelantan | 1–3 | 1–3 | 4th |
| 2013 | AFC Cup | Group G | (Vietnam) SHB Đà Nẵng | 2–3 | 1–2 | 4th |
| 2013 | AFC Cup | Group G | (Maldives) Maziya | 3–0 | 1–3 | 4th |
| 2014 | Mekong Club Championship | Semi-final | (Laos) Hoang Anh Attapeu | 1–1 (5–4 (p)) | | |
| 2014 | Mekong Club Championship | Final | (Vietnam) Becamex Binh Duong | 4–1 | | |
| 2015 | AFC Cup | Group H | (Indonesia) Persib Bandung | 1–1 | 3–3 | 2nd |
| 2015 | AFC Cup | Group H | (Maldives) New Radiant | 0–0 | 3–0 | 2nd |
| 2015 | AFC Cup | Group H | (Laos) Lao Toyota FC | 4–3 | 2–2 | 2nd |
| 2015 | AFC Cup | Round of 16 | (Malaysia) Johor Darul Ta'zim | 0–5 | | |
| 2016 | AFC Cup | Group H | (Malaysia) Johor Darul Ta'zim | 1–2 | 8–1 | 3rd |
| 2016 | AFC Cup | Group H | (India) Bengaluru FC | 0–1 | 5–3 | 3rd |
| 2016 | AFC Cup | Group H | (Laos) Lao Toyota FC | 4–2 | 2–3 | 3rd |

== Honours ==
Aya United FC – Honours
| Type | Competition | Titles | Title Seasons | Runners-up | Runners-up seasons | |
|---|---|---|---|---|---|---|
| Domestic | Myanmar National League | 0 | – | 2 | 2009–10, 2011 | |
| Domestic | MFF Charity Cup | 3 | 2012, 2014, 2015 | 1 | 2013 | |
| Domestic | MFF Cup | 2 | 2012, 2014 | 0 | – | |
| Domestic | General Aung San Shield | 1 | 2015 | 0 | – | |
| Domestic | Youth | MNL U-21 Youth League | 1 | 2017 | 0 | – |
| Domestic | Youth | MNL U-19 Youth League | 0 | – | 1 | 2017 |
| Regional | Mekong Club Championship | 0 | – | 1 | 2014 | |

== Domestic history ==
| Season | League | | | | | | | | | MFF Cup | Top goalscorer | |
| Season | Div. | Pos. | Pl. | W | D | L | GS | GA | P | MFF Cup | Name | League |
|---|---|---|---|---|---|---|---|---|---|---|---|---|
| 2009 | 1st | 8th | 7 | 1 | 1 | 5 | 4 | 12 | 4 | | | |
| 2009–10 | 1st | 2nd | 14 | 8 | 2 | 4 | 22 | 15 | 26 | | | |
| 2010 | 1st | 8th | 20 | 7 | 3 | 10 | 28 | 34 | 24 | | | |
| 2011 | 1st | 2nd | 22 | 15 | 7 | 0 | 41 | 11 | 52 | | | |
| 2012 | 1st | 5th | 26 | 13 | 7 | 6 | 45 | 31 | 46 | Champions | | |
| 2013 | 1st | 7th | 22 | 6 | 11 | 5 | 36 | 33 | 29 | | (Brazil) Leandro Duarte | 11 |
| 2014 | 1st | 5th | 21 | 9 | 6 | 6 | 37 | 30 | 33 | Champions | (Serbia) Saša Ranković | 11 |
| 2015 | 1st | 4th | 22 | 10 | 6 | 6 | 38 | 29 | 36 | Champions | (North Macedonia) Riste Naumov | 10 |
| 2016 | 1st | 4th | 22 | 10 | 7 | 5 | 39 | 29 | 37 | | (Nigeria) Christopher Chizoba | 16 |
| 2017 | 1st | 4th | 22 | 10 | 6 | 6 | 36 | 24 | 36 | Semi-finals | (Liberia) Keith Martu Nah | 15 |
| 2018 | 1st | 8 | 22 | 8 | 6 | 8 | 38 | 45 | 30 | Quarter-finals | (Cameroon) Edubat Patrick | 16 |
| 2019 | 1st | 2nd | 22 | 12 | 8 | 2 | 44 | 19 | 44 | second round | (Liberia) Keith Martu Nah | 10 |
| 2020 | 1st | 3rd | 20 | 12 | 4 | 2 | 41 | 16 | 40 | | (Nigeria) Raphael Success | 16 |
| 2022 | 1st | 5th | 18 | 8 | 4 | 6 | 34 | 20 | 28 | | (Myanmar) Yan Kyaw Htwe | 14 |
| 2023 | 1st | 9th | 22 | 7 | 5 | 10 | 34 | 42 | 26 | | (Myanmar) Nyi Nyi Aung | 7 |

== Sponsorship ==
| Period | Sportswear | Sponsor |
|---|---|---|
| 2015–2016 | (Thailand) FBT | |
| 2017–2018 | (Thailand) Grand Sport | AMI Insurance |
| 2019–2020 | (Thailand) Pro Sport | AMI Insurance |
