= Horizon F.C. =

Horizon
- Full name: Horizon Football Club
- Nickname(s): The Stallions
- Founded: 2012; 13 years ago
- Ground: Horizon Stadium
- Owner: Horizon Group
- Manager: Kyaw Kyaw Oo
- League: MNL

Horizon Football Club is a Myanmar football club founded in 2012 At the end of the 2015 MNL-2, they won promotion to the Myanmar National League.

== Former players ==
- (Nigeria) Eze Chika Philip

== See also ==
- City Yangon F.C.
