= Bahtoo Stadium =

Sports stadium in Mandalay, Myanmar

Bahtoo Memorial Stadium
- Bahtoo Stadium
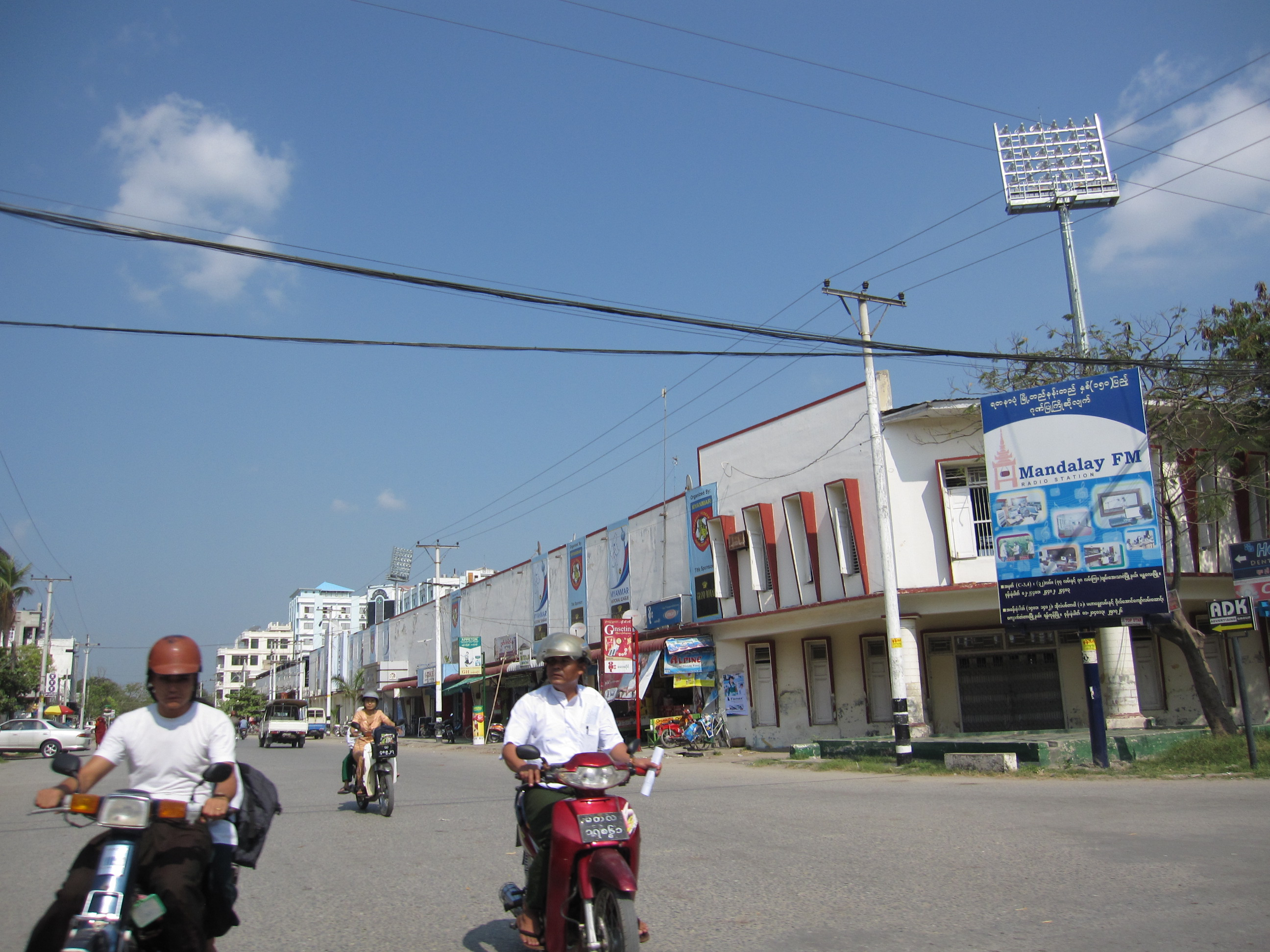
- Interactive map of Bahtoo Memorial Stadium
- Location: Mandalay, Myanmar
- Coordinates: 21°59′00″N 96°6′00″E
- Operator: Yadanarbon
- Capacity: 17,000
- Surface: Grass

Tenant
- Yadanabon FC (2010–present)

Bahtoo Memorial Stadium is a multi-purpose stadium, located in downtown Mandalay, Myanmar. Its address is the corner of 71st st and 30th st beside of the Bahtoo Sport Centre.

== Overview ==
Named after revolutionary Colonel Bahtoo, the 17,000 seat stadium was the largest stadium in Upper Myanmar before the construction of the Mandalarthiri Stadium and the home stadium of Yadanabon FC of the Myanmar National League (MNL).

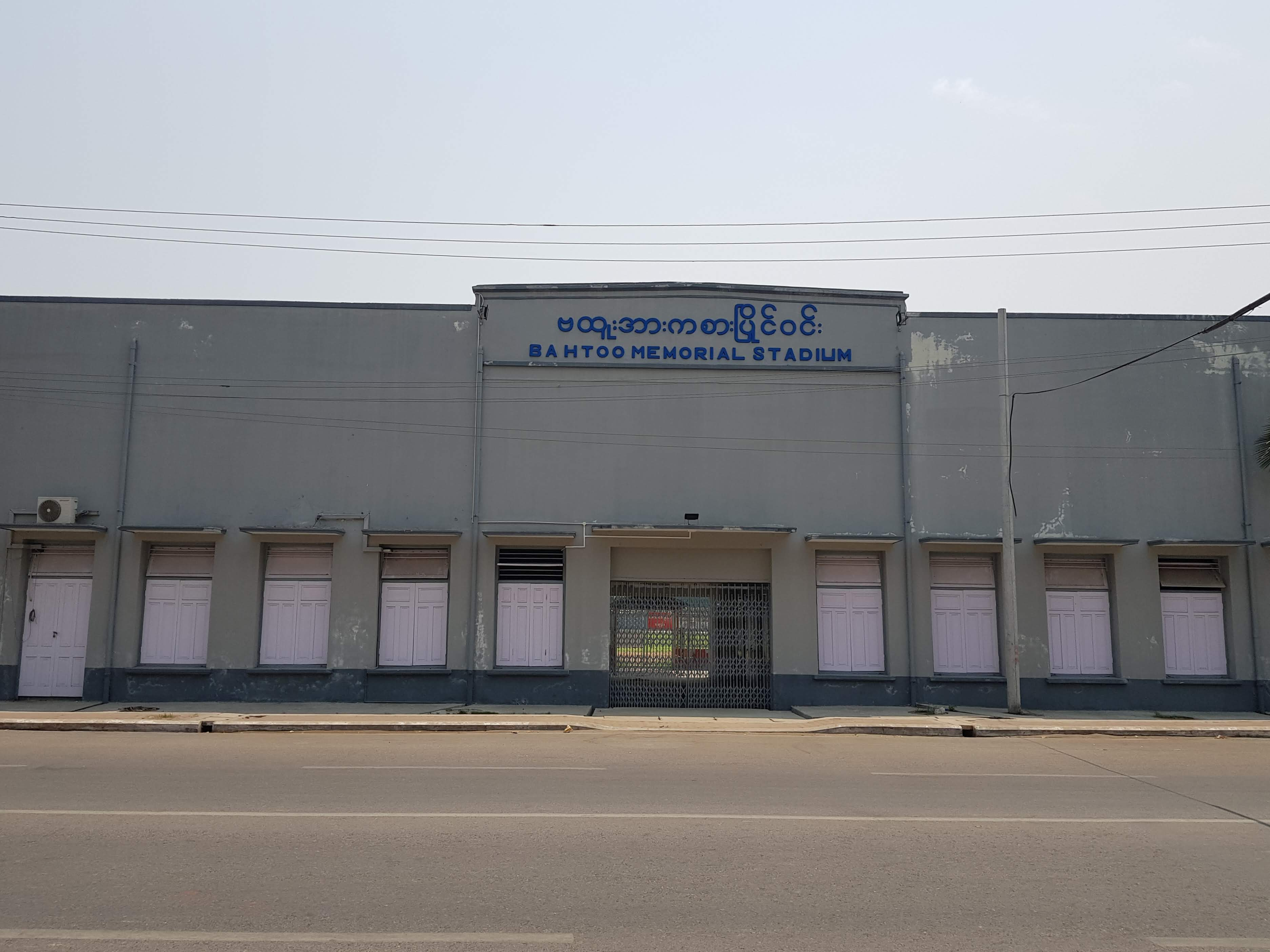
Bahtoo Stadium in 2020

Bahtoo Stadium also hosts other local and regional football tournaments. It was the venue for the 2006 Myanmar Grand Royal Challenge Cup, an international football tournament.
