= Zwekapin United F.C. =

Burmese football club

Zwekapin United F.C. ဇွဲကပင် ယူနိုက်တက် ဘောလုံး အသင်း
- Full name: Zwekapin United Football Club
- Nickname: The Mountaineers
- Founded: 2010; 16 years ago
- Ground: Hpa-An Stadium
- Capacity: 3,000
- Owner: U Hla Htay
- Manager: Kyaw Thu Oo (Women team)

Zwekapin United Football Club (Burmese: ဇွဲကပင် ယူနိုက်တက် ဘောလုံး အသင်း, pronounced [zwɛ́ɡəbɪ̀ɰ̃]; also spelled Zwegabin) is a Burmese football club based in Kayin State, Hpa-An, Myanmar. Founded in 2010, the club first competed in the 2010 season of the Myanmar National League. Zwekapin United was disbanded in 2019 and was reborn in 2026 as a women's team.

== Zwekapin United Men team ==
=== Domestic history ===
| Season | Div. | Pos. | Pl. | W | D | L | GS | GA | P | Domestic Cup | Top scorer | Goals | Manager |
|---|---|---|---|---|---|---|---|---|---|---|---|---|---|
| 2010 | 1st | 11 | 20 | 1 | 0 | 19 | 13 | 73 | 3 | | | | |
| 2011 | 1st | 12 | 20 | 1 | 0 | 21 | 11 | 71 | 3 | | | | |
| 2012 | 1st | 12 | 26 | 5 | 3 | 18 | 16 | 51 | 18 | First round | | | (France) Yohan Girard |
| 2013 | 1st | 8 | 22 | 5 | 8 | 9 | 24 | 31 | 23 | | Naumov | 4 | (Romania) Leonida Nedelcu |
| 2014 | 1st | 8 | 22 | 6 | 6 | 9 | 34 | 29 | 24 | Quarter-finals | | | (Myanmar) U Aung Min Oo |
| 2015 | 1st | 6 | 22 | 7 | 4 | 11 | 25 | 34 | 25 | 3rd round | | | (Myanmar) U San Win |
| 2016 | 1st | 8 | 22 | 8 | 4 | 10 | 29 | 26 | 28 | 3rd round | | | (Myanmar) U Aung Min Oo |
| 2017 | 1st | 8 | 22 | 8 | 2 | 12 | 20 | 32 | 26 | 2nd round | | | (Myanmar) U Min Kyi |
| 2018 | 1st | 3 | 22 | 12 | 4 | 6 | 30 | 21 | 40 | 2nd round | Than Htet Aung | 10 | (Myanmar) U Min Tun Lin |

== Zwekapin United Women team ==
=== Domestic history ===
| Season | Div. | Pos. | Pl. | W | D | L | GS | GA | P | Domestic Cup | Top scorer | Goals | Manager |
|---|---|---|---|---|---|---|---|---|---|---|---|---|---|
| 2017-18 | 1st | 4 | 14 | 4 | 4 | 6 | 18 | 32 | 16 | | | | |
| 2018-19 | 1st | 6 | 14 | 5 | 0 | 9 | 33 | 33 | 15 | | | | |
| 2026-27 | 1st | | | | | | | | | | | | |

== Players ==
=== Women team squad ===
As of June 2026

Note: Flags indicate national team as defined under FIFA eligibility rules; some limited exceptions apply. Players may hold more than one non-FIFA nationality.

| No. | Pos. | Nation | Player |
|---|---|---|---|
| 5 | MF | MYA | Lin Latt Cho |
| 7 | MF | MYA | Yin Wai Wai Theint |
| 8 | MF | MYA | Hteik Tin Kyaw |
| 9 | FW | MYA | Yawl Lun Shayi |
| 10 | FW | MYA | May July |
| 11 | MF | MYA | Kyi Phyu Htun |
| 12 | MF | MYA | Zin Mar Htun |
| 13 | MF | MYA | Nang Yu Khaing |
| 14 | MF | MYA | Ei Thandar |

| No. | Pos. | Nation | Player |
|---|---|---|---|
| 15 | FW | MYA | Yoon Pa Pa |
| 17 | MF | MYA | Aye Aye Nyein |
| 18 | GK | MYA | Wine Tone Chit |
| 19 | FW | GHA | Gloria Fosuah |
| 21 | DF | MYA | Kyi Yadanar Thein (captain) |
| 22 | DF | GHA | Rouguiatou Drame |
| 23 | DF | MYA | Ju Yu Lin |
| 24 | MF | MYA | Su Pyae Win |
| 27 | MF | GHA | Belinda Ofori |
