= Suan Lam Mang =

Burmese association football player

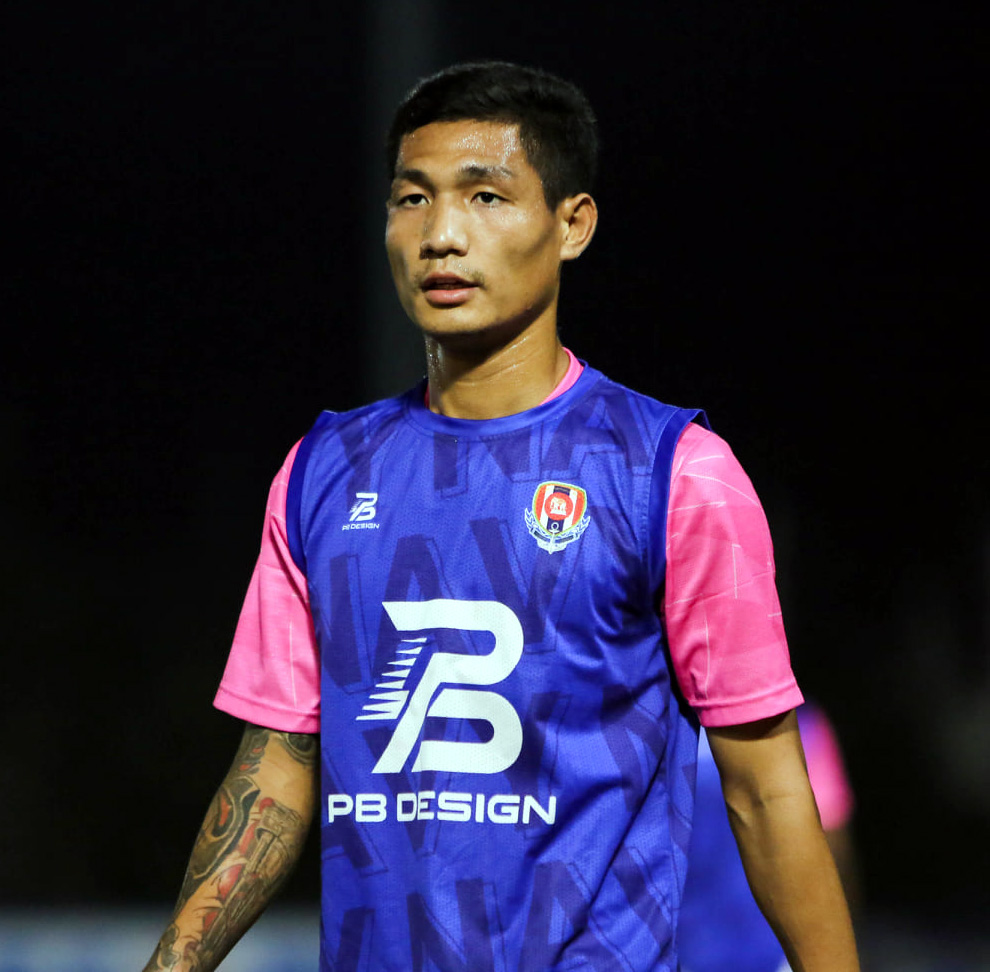

Personal information
- Full name: Suan Lam Mang
- Date of birth: July 28, 1994 (age 32)
- Place of birth: Kalay, Myanmar
- Height: 1.70 m (5 ft 7 in)
- Positions: Centre forward; right winger; right midfielder

Team information
- Current team: Yadanarbon

Youth career
- 2009: ZOFA FC

Senior career*
Years	Team	Apps	(Gls)
2010	Zwekapin United	15	(0)
2011–2017	Chin United	64	(14)
2018–2020	Yangon United	17	(0)
2019	→ Shan United (loan)	14	(2)
2020	Muangkan United	2	(2)
2020	Trat	9	(0)
2020–2021	Ranong United	16	(1)
2022	Navy	15	(3)
2022	Krabi	18	(1)
2023–2026	Dagon Star	7	(2)
2024	→ Pattaya United (loan)	8	(0)
2026–	Yadanarbon		

International career^{‡}
2015–2024	Myanmar	46	(6)
- * Club domestic league appearances and goals as of 17 March 2024 ‡ National team caps and goals as of 14 November 2024

Suan Lam Mang (Burmese: ဆွန်လမ်မန်; born 28 July 1994) is a Burmese professional footballer who plays as a forward or a winger. He made his first appearance for the Myanmar national football team in 2015.

== International statistics ==
As of match played 14 November 2024

Myanmar national team
2015	9	1
2016	9	1
2019	7	3
2021	8	1
2022	4	0
2023	5	0
2024	4	0
Total	46	6

== International goals ==
Suan Lam Mang scored his first goal for Myanmar against Laos in a 3–1 win on 13 October 2015.

Scores and results list Myanmar's goal tally first.

No.	Date	Venue	Opponent	Score	Result	Competition
1.	13 October 2015	Supachalasai Stadium, Bangkok, Thailand	Laos	1–1	3–1	2018 FIFA World Cup qualification
2.	24 March 2016	Jalan Besar Stadium, Kallang, Singapore	Singapore	1–1	1–2	Friendly
3.	7 November 2019	Mandalarthiri Stadium, Mandalay	Nepal	1–0	3–0	Friendly
4.	14 November 2019	Mandalarthiri Stadium, Mandalay, Myanmar	Tajikistan	1–0	4–3	2022 FIFA World Cup qualification
5.	14 November 2019	Mandalarthiri Stadium, Mandalay, Myanmar	Tajikistan	2–1	4–3	2022 FIFA World Cup qualification
6.	13 November 2021	Arslan Zeki Demirci Spor Kompleksi, Manavgat, Turkey	Burundi	1–0	1–2	Friendly
