= General Aung San Shield =

- Founded: 2010; 16 years ago
- Teams: 22
- Qualifier for: AFC Challenge League; ASEAN Club Championship
- Most championships: Yangon United; Ayeyawady United (3 titles each)

The General Aung San Shield (formerly the MFF Cup) is the top football knockout tournament in Myanmar.

On 26 March 2014, the MFF league committee decided the knock-out cup (General Aung San Shield) winner would compete in the Mekong Club Championship as well as earning the ticket for the AFC Cup. The tournament is currently sponsored by the Ministry of Defence.

== See also ==
Myanmar National League Cup
