= Win Naing Soe =

Burmese footballer

Personal information
- Full name: Win Naing Soe
- Date of birth: 24 October 1993 (age 33)
- Place of birth: Mandalay, Myanmar
- Height: 1.74 m (5 ft 8 1/2 in)
- Position: Forward

Youth career
- 2012–2013: Yadanarbon Youth

Senior career*
Years	Team	Apps	(Gls)
2014–2021	Yadanarbon FC	103	(77)
Total		103	(77)

International career
2016–2021	Myanmar	7	(0)
- * Club domestic league appearances and goals

Win Naing Soe (Burmese: ဝင်းနိုင်စိုး; born 24 October 1993) is a Burmese footballer who plays as a midfielder for Yadanarbon FC. He is the top goalscorer of both 2016 Myanmar National League and 2016 General Aung San Shield tournaments after scoring a combine total of 22 goals in one calendar year.

== Honours ==
=== Club ===
Yadanarbon

- Myanmar National League (2): 2014, 2016

=== Individual ===
- Myanmar National League Top scorer (2): 2016, 2019
- General Aung San Shield Top scorer (1): 2016
