= Bogyoke Aung San Stadium =

Multi-purpose sports stadium in Myanmar

- Aung San Stadium
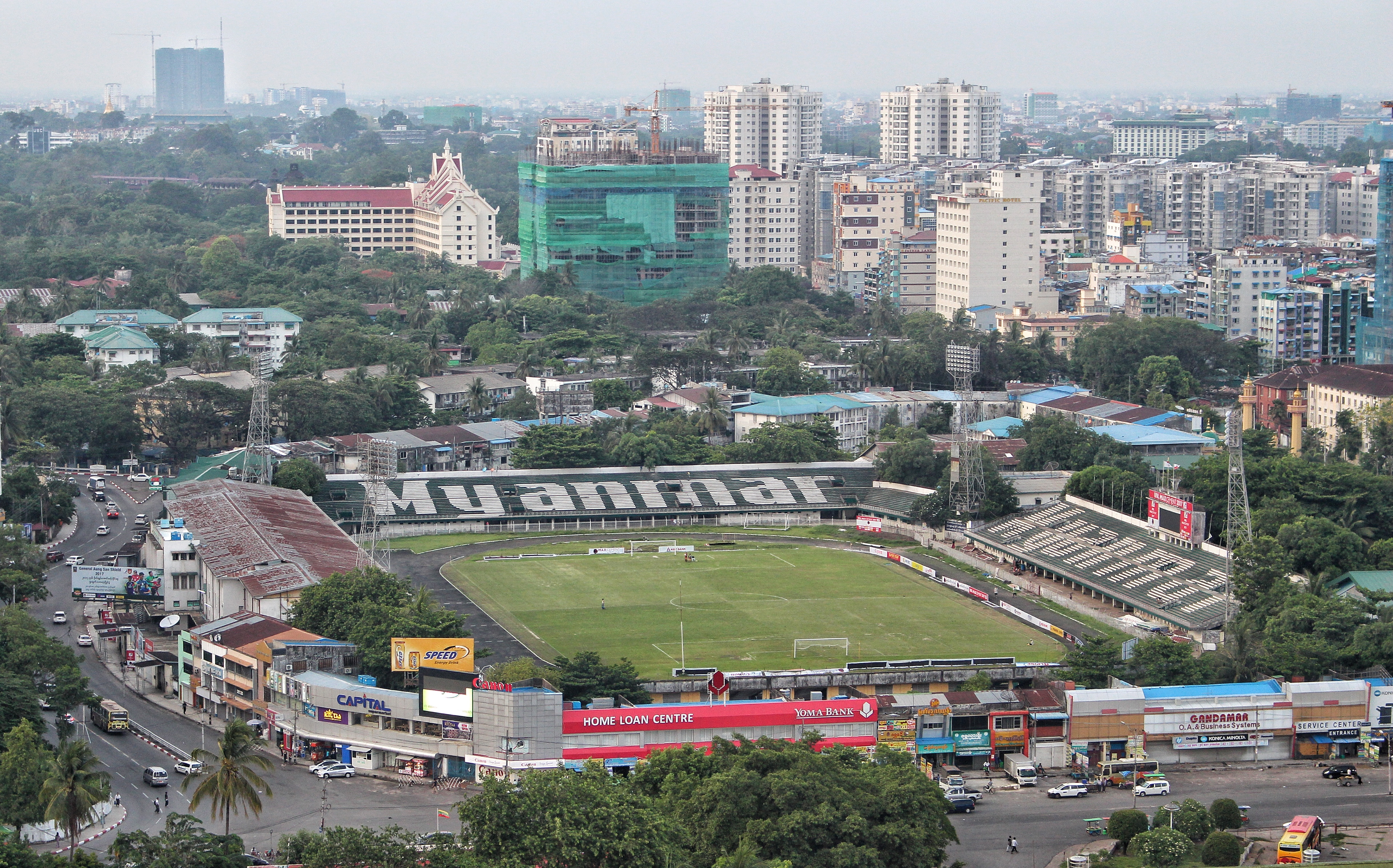
- Aerial view of the Stadium
- Interactive map of Bogyoke Aung San Stadium
- Former names: Burma Athletic Association Ground
- Location: Mingala Taungnyunt 11221, Yangon, Myanmar
- Coordinates: 16°47′1.90″N 96°9′38.61″E
- Capacity: 10000
- Surface: Grass

Construction
- Opened: 1909

Tenant
- Yangon United FC

The Bogyoke Aung San Stadium (Burmese: ဗိုလ်ချုပ် အောင်ဆန်း အားကစားကွင်း, MLCTS: buil hkyup aung hcan: a: ka. ca: kwang:) is a multi-purpose stadium located in downtown Yangon, Myanmar. It was built as an athletic ground in 1906, which was completed in 1909 and named as Burma Athletic Association Ground, where many sports were held such as cricket, football and tennis. The 400 m (1,300 ft) runway was constructed in 1935.

== Overview ==
Renovated and renamed after Aung San in 1953, the 40,000-seat stadium is still the largest stadium in Myanmar and was the national stadium until the mid-1980s. The stadium was the main venue for 1961 and 1969 South East Asian Peninsular Games. While it is no longer the main venue of choice for international level competitions, the stadium is still heavily used for Myanmar National League football matches.

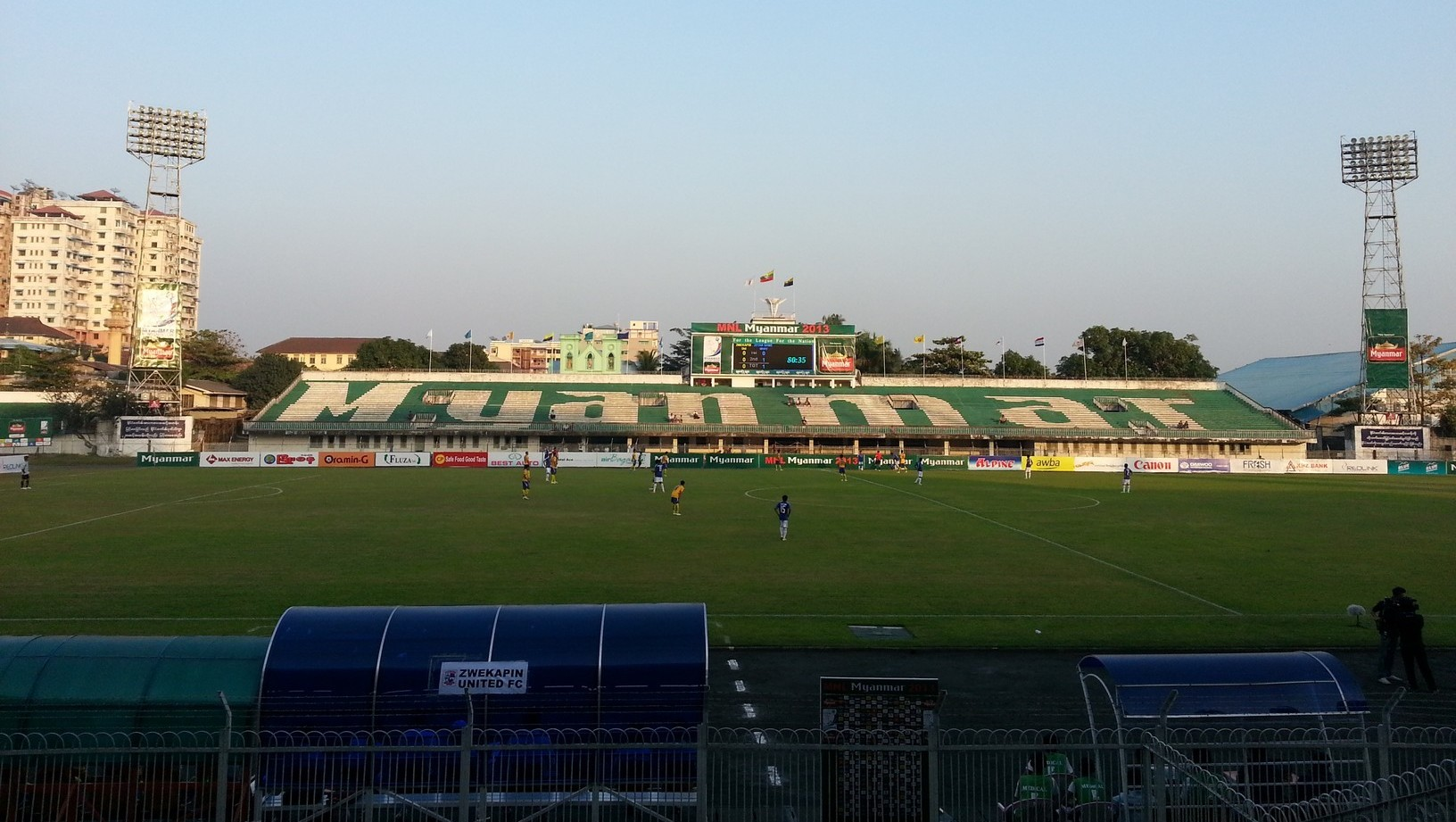
Aung San Stadium

Aung San National Indoor Stadium, located next to the outdoor stadium, is used for indoor sports competitions.

== See also ==
- Lists of stadiums
