= Rakhine United F.C. =

Rakhine United ရခိုင်ယူနိုက်တက်
- Full name: Rakhine United Football Club
- Nicknames: The Arakan Warriors (ရခိုင်စစ်သည်များ)
- Founded: 2009; 17 years ago, as Rakhine United
- Ground: Wai Thar Li Stadium, Sittwe
- Capacity: 7,000
- Owner: U Hla Kyaw Win
- Head coach: Moe Hein Myint
- League: Myanmar National League
- 2025-26: 11th
- Website: www.rakhineunitedfc.com
Home colours	Away colours

Rakhine United Football Club (Burmese: ရခိုင်ယူနိုက်တက် ဘောလုံးအသင်း) is a Burmese professional football club based in Sittwe, Rakhine State that play in the Myanmar National League.

== History ==
Founded in 2009, the club changed their name to Rakhapura United in December 2010. In December 2012, the club reverted to their original name Rakhine United.

== Stadium ==
Rakhine United played their home matches at the Dhanyawaddy Stadium, a multi-use stadium, until 2016. The stadium has a capacity of 7,000 spectators. Since 2017, the club started playing at the Wai Thar Li Stadium, also with a capacity of 7,000.

== Kit and sponsorship history ==
Period	Kit manufacturer	Shirt sponsor
2011–2014		(Myanmar) Golden Gate International
2015	(Myanmar) Orona	(Myanmar) Bostwick
2016	(Thailand) Grand Sport	(Myanmar) Up Energy Drink
2017		(Myanmar) United Amara Bank
2018	(Thailand) Pro Sports	(Myanmar) United Amara Bank
2019–2020	(Thailand) Pro Sports	(Myanmar) Golden Gate International
2021–2022	(Thailand) Warrix	(Myanmar) Rakhapura
2023	(Myanmar) Ayeyawady Sport	(Myanmar) Rakhapura
2024–2025	(Myanmar) Rhino Sport	(Myanmar) Rakhapura
2025–2026	(Myanmar) Glory Sport	(Myanmar) Rakhapura
2026-	(Myanmar) X-one	

== Coaches ==
Name	Nationality	Period	Honours
Rudi Minkovski	(Bulgaria)	2010–2011	
Leonardo Neiva	(Brazil)	2011–November 2012	
U Han Tun	(Myanmar)	November 2012–2013	
U Aung Naing	(Myanmar)	January–September 2013	
U Aung Zaw Myo	(Myanmar)	September–December 2013	
U Win Tin	(Myanmar)	December 2013– November 2015	MNL-2 runners-up
U Aung Zaw Myo	(Myanmar)	December 2015–December 2016	
U Soe Thein	(Myanmar)	December 2016–November 2018	
U Than Wai	(Myanmar)	December 2018–2023	
Paulo Jorge Silva	(Portugal)	2024	
Moe Hein Myint	(Myanmar)	2026-	

== Current players ==
As of November 2026

Note: Flags indicate national team as defined under FIFA eligibility rules; some limited exceptions apply. Players may hold more than one non-FIFA nationality.

No.	Pos.	Nation	Player
2	DF	MYA	Thet Naing Oo
3	DF	MYA	Nyein Chan Thu
4	DF	MYA	Naing Naing Win
6	DF	MYA	Aung Phyo
8	MF	MYA	Min Khant Kyaw
10	MF	MYA	Zaw Zaw Naing (captain)
11	MF	MYA	Nyi Nyi Tun
12	MF	MYA	Thung Zaw Myat
13	MF	MYA	Khant Thu Lin
16	GK	MYA	Chan Nyein Kyaw

No.	Pos.	Nation	Player
17	FW	MYA	Ko Ko Maung
22	GK	MYA	Aung Sithu
24	DF	MYA	Aung Pyae Phyo
26	DF	MYA	Tin San
27	DF	MYA	Htet Khant Kyaw Thu
28	DF	MYA	Soe Wunna Aung
29	MF	MYA	Tun Naing Soe
44	DF	MYA	Han Htet Oo
47	MF	MYA	Wai Min Htut
70	MF	MYA	Ye Htet Naing
77	MF	MYA	Naing Win
99	FW	MYA	Nyein Paing Htet

== Technical staff ==
As of May 2025

- Chairman: U Hla Kyaw Win
- Chief Executive Officer: U Kyaw Lwin
- Head coach:
- Technical advisor: U Kyi Lwin
- Assistant coach: U Min Thu
- Fitness and conditioning coach: U Maung Maung Myint
- Goalkeeping coach: U Zaw Win Htay
- Physiotherapist: U Aung Thin
- Media officer: U Thet Htoo Naing Oo

== Honours ==
=== Domestic ===
- MNL-2
  - Runners-up (1): 2014
- FIFA-MFF U-17 Youth League
  - Runners-up (1): 2023–24
- FIFA-MFF U-15 Youth League
  - Runners-up (1): 2024
