= 2020 Myanmar National League =

Myanmar National League
- Season: 2020
- Dates: 10 January – 1 October 2020
- Champions: Shan United
- Relegated: Chin United; Zwekapin United
- Champions League: Shan United
- AFC Cup: Shan United; Hantharwady United
- Matches: 90
- Goals: 284 (3.16 per match)
- Top goalscorer: Raphael Success (16 goals)
- Best goalkeeper: Ko Ko Naing (9 clean sheets)
- Biggest home win: Hantharwady United 5–0 Southern Myanmar (2 February)
- Biggest away win: Magwe 0–6 Yangon United (22 August)
- Longest winning run: Shan United (11 matches)
- Longest unbeaten run: Ayeyawady United (17 matches)
- Longest winless run: Magwe (12 matches)
- Longest losing run: Southern Myanmar(6 matches)

The 2020 Myanmar National League is the 11th season of the Myanmar National League, the top Myanmar professional league for association football clubs since its establishment in 2009. It is also known as MPT Myanmar National League due to the sponsorship deal with Myanma Posts and Telecommunications. Recently, AIA agreed a sponsorship deal with Myanmar National League in order to support both MNL and Myanmar Football. A total of 12 football teams will compete in the league.

Shan United are the defending champions, while Chin United and I.S.P.E have been promoted from the 2019 MNL-2. Shan United were crowned champions in the final matchday, defeating 4-time winner Yadanarbon.

The 1st transfer window is from 9 November 2019 to 10 January 2020 . The 2nd mid season transfer window is from 6 April 2020 to 7 May 2020.

On March 1, all National League matches were played behind closed doors as broadcast-only events. On March 24, MNL postponed all the matches after the first reports of COVID-19 cases in the country.

On June 10, after MFF & MNL meeting, Zwekapin United and Chin United were disbanded from Myanmar National League. All Zwekapin United and Chin United matches, goals and marks are cancelled.

All remaining matches will be held in Yangon due to the COVID-19 pandemic.

Yangon United crashed out of the title race despite being obliterated by Shan United 4–0 on 16 September 2020. Ayeyawady United lost their unbeaten run after losing 2–1 to Shan United.

== Changes from last season ==
=== Team changes ===
==== Promoted Clubs ====
Promoted from the 2019 MNL-2

- Chin United
- I.S.P.E

==== Relegated Clubs ====
Relegated from the 2019 Myanmar National League

- Dagon (Withdrawn from League)
- Chinland

== 2020 Title Sponsor ==
Myanma Posts and Telecommunications signed 3 years contract with MNL. They help to develop Myanmar Football and Youth program.

2020 MNL Title Sponsor
- Type: mobile, voice and data
- Location: Myanmar
- Frequency: 450/800 MHz, 900/2100 MHz
- Established: 1884
- Current status: operational
- Website: www.mpt.com.mm

== Clubs ==
=== Stadiums ===
Locations of the 2020 Myanmar National League

Club	Home City	Stadium	Capacity
Ayeyawady United	Pathein	Ayar Stadium	6,000
Hantharwady United	Bago	Grand Royal Stadium	4,000
I.S.P.E	Mandalay	Mandalarthiri Stadium	30,000
Magwe	Magway	Magway Stadium*	3,000
Rakhine United	Sittwe	Weithali Stadium	7,000
Sagaing United	Monywa	Monywa Stadium	5,000
Shan United	Taunggyi	Taunggyi Stadium	7,000
Southern Myanmar	Mawlamyaing	Ramanya Stadium	10,000
Yadanarbon	Mandalay	Bahtoo Stadium	17,000
Yangon United	Yangon	Yangon United Sports Complex	3,500

(*) – not ready to play. MNL clubs that have not had their home stadia ready to host home matches currently use Aung San Stadium and Thuwunna Stadium in Yangon.

=== Personnel and sponsoring ===
Note: Flags indicate national team as defined under FIFA eligibility rules. Players may hold more than one non-FIFA nationality.

Team	Head coach	Captain	Kit manufacturer	Shirt sponsor
Ayeyawady United	(Myanmar) U Myo Hlaing Win	(Myanmar) Kyaw Zin Phyo	(Thailand) Pro Sport	AYA Sompo; Pocari Sweat; AIA
Hantharwady United	(Myanmar) U Myo Min Tun	(Myanmar) Ko Ko Naing	(Myanmar) SCM	Grand Royal; AIA
I.S.P.E	(Myanmar) U Aung Nay Win	(Myanmar) Zin Ye Naung	(Myanmar) M21 Sports	AIA
Magwe	(Myanmar) U Zaw Win Tun	(Myanmar) Naing Naing Kyaw	(Myanmar) SCM	AIA
Rakhine United	(Myanmar) U Than Wai	(Nigeria) Kelvin Kudus	(Thailand) Pro Sport	Golden Gate Co. Ltd; AIA
Sagaing United	(Myanmar) U Zaw Linn Tun	(Myanmar) Toe Sat Naing	(Thailand) Pro Sport	Zaw Gi Myanmar; 100plus Max Cement; AIA
Shan United	(Myanmar) U Aung Naing	(Myanmar) Thiha Sithu	(Thailand) Pro Sport	KBZ Pay; AIA
Southern Myanmar	(Myanmar) U Kyaw Min	(Myanmar) Pyae Phyo Aung	(Thailand) Pro Sport	Yuzana Group; AIA
Yadanarbon	(Myanmar) U Aung Kyaw Moe	(Myanmar) Hlaing Bo Bo	(Myanmar) M21 Sports	Alpine; AIA
Yangon United	(Myanmar) U Min Tun Lin	(Myanmar) Kyaw Zin Htet	(Thailand) FBT	AGD Bank; Royal-D; ATE; Harry's Bar; Htoo Group; FNI Insurance; AIA

=== Managerial changes ===
Team	Outgoing manager	Manner of departure	Date of vacancy	Week	Table	Incoming manager
Yangon United	(Myanmar) Tin Maung Tun	Demoted	27 August 2020	Week 11	3	(Myanmar) Min Tun Lin

=== Foreign players ===
Club	Player 1	Player 2	Player 3	Asian Player	Former
Ayeyawady United	(Nigeria) Raphael Success	(Zimbabwe) Victor Kamhuka			
Hantharwady United	(Nigeria) Francis Emeka	(Ivory Coast) Kekere Moukailou	(Ivory Coast) Donald Bissa		
I.S.P.E					
Magwe					
Sagaing United	(Nigeria) Barnabas Friday	(Cameroon) Soulemanou Mandjombe	(Cameroon) Ella Patrick Edubat		
Shan United	(Ivory Coast) Djawa Djedje Maximin	(Liberia) Keith Nah	(Ghana) Yakubu Abubakar	(Kyrgyzstan) Daniel Tagoe	
Southern Myanmar					
Rakhine United	(Nigeria) Kelvin Kudus Momoh	(Nigeria) Idoko Sunday Mathew	(Ghana) Amponsah Alexander		
Yadanarbon					
Yangon United	(Nigeria) Emmanuel Uzochukwu	(Ghana) Ernest Barfo	(Burkina Faso) Ernest Aboubacar Congo	(Japan) Shori Murata	

== League table ==
Pos	Team	Pld	W	D	L	GF	GA	GD	Pts	Qualification or relegation
1	Shan United (C)	18	14	2	2	42	16	+26	44	Qualification for AFC Champions League play-offs
2	Hantharwady United	18	13	2	3	42	16	+26	41	Qualification for AFC Cup play-off round
3	Ayeyawady United	18	12	4	2	41	16	+25	40	standby team for AFC Cup group stage
4	Yangon United	18	11	4	3	39	18	+21	37	
5	Yadanarbon	18	5	5	8	30	30	0	20	
6	Rakhine United	18	5	3	10	15	28	−13	18	
7	Sagaing United	18	5	2	11	28	38	−10	17	
8	Magwe	18	4	4	10	23	45	−22	16	
9	ISPE	18	3	2	13	12	45	−33	11	
10	Southern Myanmar United	18	2	4	12	12	32	−20	10	Relegation Playoffs
11	Chin United (R)	0	0	0	0	0	0	0	0	Disqualified
12	Zwegapin United (R)	0	0	0	0	0	0	0	0	Disqualified

Updated to match(es) played on 1 Oct 2020. Source: Soccerway
(C) Champions; (R) Relegated

=== Positions by round ===
Team ╲ Round	1	2	3	4	5	6	7	8	9	10	11	12	13	14	15	16	17	18	19	20
Shan United	5	7	5	5	5	4	4	4	4	4	4	4	4	4	4	3	3	3	1	1
Hantharwady United	4	2	1	1	1	1	1	1	1	1	1	1	1	1	1	1	1	1	2	2
Ayeyawady United	6	5	3	3	3	2	2	3	2	2	2	2	2	2	2	2	2	2	3	3
Yangon United	3	1	2	2	2	3	3	2	3	3	3	3	3	3	3	4	4	4	4	4
Yadanarbon	1	3	6	6	7	8	7	7	7	7	6	6	6	6	5	5	5	5	5	5
Sagaing United	2	4	7	7	6	6	6	5	6	6	7	5	5	7	7	7	7	6	6	6
Rakhine United	11	8	4	4	4	5	5	6	5	5	5	7	7	5	6	6	6	7	7	7
Magwe	7	9	8	8	8	7	8	9	8	8	9	9	9	9	9	9	9	9	9	8
I.S.P.E	10	11	11	10	10	9	8	9	9	9	8	8	8	8	8	8	8	8	8	9
Southern Myanmar	8	10	10	12	12	12	11	10	11	10	10	10	10	10	10	10	10	10	10	10
Chin United	9	6	9	9	9	9	10	11	12	12	11	11	11	11	11	11	11	11	11	11
Zwegapin United	12	12	12	11	11	11	12	12	10	11	12	12	12	12	12	12	12	12	12	12

Qualification to the 2021 AFC Champions League Preliminary round 1
Standby team to the 2021 AFC Cup
Relegation to the 2021 MNL-2

Source: =2020 MNL

=== Results by match played ===
Team ╲ Round	1	2	3	4	5	6	7	8	9	10	11	12	13	14	15	16	17	18	19	20
Ayeyawady United	D	W	W	W	W	W	D	W	W	W	W	D	W	W	W	W	W	L	L	D
Hantharwady United	W	W	W	W	W	W	W	L	W	W	W	W	W	L	W	W	D	W	L	D
I.S.P.E	L	L	L	W	L	L	W	D	L	L	D	L	W	D	L	L	L	L	W	L
Magwe	D	L	W	D	D	D	L	L	D	L	L	D	L	L	L	W	L	L	W	W
Rakhine United	L	W	W	W	D	D	D	L	W	L	L	D	L	W	L	L	L	D	L	L
Sagaing United	W	D	L	W	W	W	L	W	L	W	L	L	L	L	L	L	W	W	D	L
Shan United	W	L	W	L	W	W	D	W	D	W	W	W	W	W	W	W	W	W	W	W
Southern Myanmar	L	L	L	L	L	L	W	D	L	L	D	D	L	D	L	L	L	W	L	W
Yadanarbon	W	D	D	L	L	L	D	D	W	W	W	L	L	L	W	W	W	L	D	L
Yangon United	W	W	D	W	W	W	D	W	L	W	L	W	W	W	W	L	D	D	D	W

Source: =2020 MNL
W = Win; D = Draw; L = Lose

== Matches ==
Fixtures and results of the Myanmar National League 2020 season.

=== Week 1 ===
10/1/2020	I.S.P.E	0–1	Shan United	Mandalarthiri Stadium, Mandalay
15:30 UTC+06:30			Keith Martu Nah 62'

11/1/2020	Zwegabin United	0–2	Yadanarbon	Thuwunna Stadium, Yangon
16:00 UTC+06:30			Win Naing Soe 23' (pen.); Myo Ko Tun 53'

11/1/2020	Ayeyawady United	0–0	Magwe	Ayar Stadium, Pathein
15:30 UTC+06:30

12/1/2020	Hanthawaddy United	1–0	Rakhine United	Grand Royal Stadium, Bago
15:30 UTC+06:30	Francis Emeka 43'

12/1/2020	Yangon United	2–1	Chin United	Y.U.S.C, Yangon
15:30 UTC+06:30	Than Paing 24'; Emmanuel Uzochukwu 84'		Kyaw Min Than 45+2'

12/1/2020	Southern Myanmar	2–3	Sagaing United	Yamanya Stadium, Mawlamyine
15:30 UTC+06:30	Aung Myat Thu 22'; Kaung Sithu 53'		Kyaw Swar Min 42', 70'; Myo Min Phyo 43'

=== Week 2 ===
17/1/2020	Chin United	2–0	Magwe	Y.U.S.C, Yangon
15:30 UTC+06:30	Akakapo 45+3'; Kyaw Min Than 89'

18/1/2020	Yadanarbon	1–1	Sagaing United	Bahtoo Stadium, Mandalay
15:30 UTC+06:30	Aung Thu 18'		Zaw Lin Htet 38'

18/1/2020	Southern Myanmar	0–1	Rakhine United	Yamanya Stadium, Mawlamyine
15:30 UTC+06:30			Kaung Myat Kyaw 21'

18/1/2020	Hanthawaddy United	2–1	Shan United	Grand Royal Stadium, Bago
15:30 UTC+06:30	Donald Bissa 65' (pen.), 86'		Keith Martu Nah 7'

19/1/2020	Yangon United	3–1	Zwekapin United	Y.U.S.C, Yangon
15:30 UTC+06:30	Emmanuel Uzochukwu 39', 90+3'; Maung Maung Lwin 73'		Emerson Reis Luiz 19'

19/1/2020	Ayeyawady United	2–1	I.S.P.E	Ayar Stadium, Pathein
15:30 UTC+06:30	Akwa Raphael Success 48' (pen.); 86'		Zaw Moon Aung 61'

=== Week 3 ===
25/1/2020	Chin United	1–3	Hantharwady United	Thuwunna Stadium, Yangon
16:00 UTC+06:30	Kyaw Min Than 79'		Francis Emeka 17'; Donald Bissa 28'; Nan Wai Min 72'

25/1/2020	Sagaing United	1–2	Shan United	Monywa Stadium, Sagaing
15:30 UTC+06:30	Ella Patrick Edubat 62'		Set Phyo Wai 73'; Yan Naing Oo 77'

25/1/2020	Southern Myanmar	1–2	Magwe	Yamanya Stadium, Mawlamyine
15:30 UTC+06:30	Aung Myat Thu 33'		Pyae Moe 39'; Wai Yan Tun 55'

26/1/2020	Ayeyarwady United	1–0	Zwekapin United	Ayar Stadium, Ayeyarwady
15:30 UTC+06:30	Thiha Zaw 88'

26/1/2020	Yangon United	2–2	Yadanarbon	Y.U.S.C, Yangon
15:30 UTC+06:30	Emmanuel Uzochukwu 39', 77' (pen.)		Zaw Ye Tun 56'; Myo Ko Tun 74'

26/1/2020	Rakhine United	2–0	I.S.P.E	Waitharli Stadium, Rakhine
15:30 UTC+06:30	Ti Nyein Minn 44'; Aung Thant Zaw 55'

=== Week 4 ===
31/1/2020	Zwekapin United	0–0	Magwe	Thuwunna Stadium, Yangon
16:00 UTC+06:30

1/2/2020	I.S.P.E	1–0	Chin United	Mandalar Thiri Stadium, Mandalay
15:30 UTC+06:30	Htet Arkar Lin 82'

1/2/2020	Ayeyawady United	1–0	Shan United	Ayar Stadium, Pathein
15:30 UTC+06:30	Success 57'

2/2/2020	Rakhine United	1–0	Yadanarbon	Waithali Stadium, Sittwe
15:30 UTC+06:30	Kaung Myat Kyaw 50'

2/2/2020	Yangon United	2–0	Sagaing United	Y.U.S.C, Yangon
15:30 UTC+06:30	Nyein Chan Aung 59'; Shori Murata 90+3'

2/2/2020	Hanthawady United	5–0	Southern Myanmar	Grand Royal Stadium, Bago
15:30 UTC+06:30	Emeka 11', 21', 88'; Aung Moe Htwe 49'; Donald Bissa 70'

=== Week 5 ===
7/2/2020	Magwe	0–3	Hantharwady United	Thuwunna Stadium, Yangon
15:30 UTC+06:30			Francis Emeka 43', 45+2'; Donald Bissa 66'

8/2/2020	Yangon United	2–0	ISPE	YUSC Stadium, Yangon
15:30 UTC+06:30	Ernest Aboubacar Congo 41'; Maung Maung Lwin 58'

8/2/2020	Ayeyawady United	2–1	Southern Myanmar	Ayar Stadium, Pathein
15:30 UTC+06:30	Victor Kamhuka 82'; Soe Moe Kyaw 90+4'		Swan Htet Aung 56'

8/2/2020	Zwekapin United	0–3	Sagaing United	Thuwunna Stadium, Yangon
15:30 UTC+06:30			Barnabas Friday 8'; Ella Patrick Edubat 35' (pen.), 82'

9/2/2020	Rakhine United	0–0	Chin United	Waitharli Stadium, Sittwe
15:30 UTC+06:30

9/2/2020	Yadanarbon	1–3	Shan United	Mandalarthiri Stadium, Mandalay
15:30 UTC+06:30	Aung Thu 3'		David Htan 37' (pen.); Nanda Kyaw 52'; Daniel Tagoe 55'

=== Week 6 ===
15/2/2020	Hantharwady United	4–1	Yadanarbon	Grand Royal Stadium, Bago
15:30 UTC+06:30	Donald Bissa 45+2', 57'; Francis Emeka 84'; Hein Htet Aung 90+3'		Hlaing Bo Bo 15'

15/2/2020	Rakhine United	1–1	Magwe	Waitharli Stadium, Sittwe
15:30 UTC+06:30	Naing Naing Kyaw 27' (o.g.)		Thein Zaw 71'

15/2/2020	Chin United	0–1	Ayeyarwady United	Thuwunna Stadium, Yangon
16:00 UTC+06:30			Than Htet Aung 3'

16/2/2020	Southern Myanmar United	0–1	Yangon United	Yamanya Stadium, Mawlamyine
15:30 UTC+06:30			Than Paing 78'

16/2/2020	ISPE	1–6	Sagaing United	Mandalarthiri Stadium, Mandalay
15:30 UTC+06:30	Thant Zin Myint 76'		Edubat Patrick 27', 80', 89'; Barnabas Friday 35'; Aung Hein Kyaw 54'; Myo Min Phyo 84'

16/2/2020	Zwekapin United	0–1	Shan United	Thuwunna Stadium, Yangon
16:00 UTC+06:30			Djedje Maximin Djawa 89'

=== Week 7 ===
21/2/2020	ISPE	2–1	Magwe	Mandalar Thiri Stadium, Mandalay
16:00 UTC+06:30	Khin Kyaw Win 66'; Kyi Soe 73'		Thein Zaw 4'

22/2/2020	Yangon United	2–2	Shan United	YUSC, Yangon
15:30 UTC+06:30	Shori 28'; Ernest Barfo 74'		Hein Phyo Win 12'; Aboubakar 76'

22/2/2020	Southern Myanmar	8–3	Chin United	Yamanya Stadium, Mawlamyine
15:30 UTC+06:30	Aung Myat Thu 25', 45+1', 46'; Yan Kyaw Htwe 40', 86'; Paing Soe Wai 45+1'; Shine Thuya 71'; Phyo Thet Oo 83'		Chukwuekweka 48'; Akakpo 58'; Nan Min Aung 72'

22/2/2020	Zwekapin United	1–1	Rakhine United	Thuwunna Stadium, Yangon
16:00 UTC+06:30	Yassan 45+2'		Kaung Myat Kyaw 85'

23/2/2020	Hanthawady United	1–0	Sagaing United	Grand Royal Stadium, Bago
15:30 UTC+06:30	Aung Myo Thura 90'

23/2/2020	Ayeyawady United	1–1	Yadanarbon	Ayar Stadium, Pathein
15:30 UTC+06:30	Soe Moe Kyaw 73'		Aung Thu 89'

=== Week 8 ===
28/2/2020	ISPE	1–1	Zwekapin United	Mandalar Thiri Stadium, Mandalay
16:00 UTC+06:30	Aung Zayar Phyo 8'		Emerson Luiz 5'

29/2/2020	Ayeyawady United	1–0	Hanthawady United	Ayar Stadium, Pathein
15:30 UTC+06:30	Yar Zar Aung 46'

29/2/2020	Sagaing United	4–0	Magwe	Monywa Stadium, Monywa
15:30 UTC+06:30	Toe Sat Naing 23'; Kaung Htet Kyaw 49'; Patrick 76'; Aung Ko Ko Win 83'

29/2/2020	Southern Myanmar	1–1	Yadanarbon	Ramanya Stadium, Mawlamyine
16:00 UTC+06:30	Yan Kyaw Htwe 20'		Win Naing Soe 81' (pen.)

1/3/2020	Chin United	1–3	Shan United	Thuwunna Stadium, Yangon
16:00 UTC+06:30	Samuel 55'		Ye Yint Tun 45+1'; Nanda Kyaw 89'; Zin Min Tun 90+5'

1/3/2020	Rakhine United	0–1	Yangon United	Waithali Stadium, Sittwe
15:30 UTC+06:30			Emmanuel 80'

=== Week 9 ===
6/3/2020	Magwe	1–1	Shan United	Thuwunna Stadium, Yangon
16:00 UTC+06:30	Wai Yan Tun 23'		Zin Min Tun 74'

7/3/2020	Yadanarbon	2–1	Chin United	Mandalar Thiri Stadium, Mandalay
15:30 UTC+06:30	Win Naing Soe 69'; Hlaing Bo Bo 79'		Samuel 16'

7/3/2020	Ayeyawady United	1–0	Yangon United	Ayar Stadium, Pathein
15:30 UTC+06:30	Success 67'

7/3/2020	Rakhine United	2–1	Sagaing United	Ramanya Stadium, Mawlamyine
15:30 UTC+06:30	Min Ko Thu 20'; Aung Kyaw Thu 86'		Friday 43'

7/3/2020	Zwekapin United	3–1	Southern Myanmar	Thuwunna Stadium, Yangon
16:00 UTC+06:30	Min Zaw Soe 45+2'; Yassan 56', 76'		Kaung Sithu 90+4'

8/3/2020	Hanthawady United	5–0	ISPE	Grand Royal Stadium, Bago
15:30 UTC+06:30	Myo Zaw Oo 8', 22'; Hein Htet Aung 33'; Francis Emeka 83'; Donald Bissa 87'

=== Week 10 ===
23/3/2020	Hanthawady United	4–2	Zwekapin United	Thuwunna Stadium, Yangon
16:00 UTC+06:30	Donald Bissa 14' (pen.), 37', 66'; Francis Emeka 70' (pen.)		Min Zaw Soe 53'; Emerson 54'

23/3/2020	Sagaing United	3–1	Chin United	YUSC Stadium, Yangon
16:00 UTC+06:30	Kaung Myat Kyaw 32'; Edubat 41'; Dixon 44' (o.g.)		Samuel 36'

22/8/2020	Magwe	0–6	Yangon United	YUSC Stadium, Yangon
15:30 UTC+06:30			Barfo 26'; Maung Maung Lwin 41'; Emmanuel Uzochukwu 45+1'; Yan Pai Soe 72'; Kyi Lin 82', 89'

22/8/2020	Shan United	1–0	Southern Myanmar	Thuwunna Stadium, Yangon
16:00 UTC+06:30	Nanda Kyaw 81'

23/8/2020	Yadanarbon	4–0	ISPE	Thuwunna Stadium, Yangon
16:00 UTC+06:30	Myo Ko Tun 61'; Aung Thu 83', 86', 90+2'

23/8/2020	Ayeyawady United	4–0	Rakhine United	YUSC Stadium, Yangon
16:00 UTC+06:30	Soe Moe Kyaw 27'; Success 36', 62'; Than Htet Aung 72'

=== Week 11 ===
26/8/2020	Yangon United	1–3	Hanthawady United	Thuwunna Stadium, Yangon
16:00 UTC+06:30	Emmanuel Uzochukwu 42'		Hein Htet Aung 52'; Donald Bissa 58'; Francis Emeka 81'

26/8/2020	Yadanarbon	4–1	Magwe	YUSC Stadium, Yangon
16:00 UTC+06:30	Myo Ko Tun 19', 32', 49'; Win Naing Soe 58'		Thiha 9'

26/8/2020	Southern Myanmar	1–1	ISPE	Padonmar Stadium, Yangon
15:30 UTC+06:30	Yan Kyaw Htwe 60'		Kyi Soe 42'

27/8/2020	Shan United	1–0	Rakhine United	YUSC Stadium, Yangon
16:00 UTC+06:30	Nanda Kyaw 19'

27/8/2020	Sagaing United	1–6	Ayeyawady United	Thuwunna Stadium, Yangon
16:00 UTC+06:30	Patrick 48'		Success 5' (pen.), 52'; Than Htet Aung 16'; Win Naing Tun 72'; Thiha Zaw 79'; Kaung Myat Thu 81'

=== Week 12 ===
30/8/2020	ISPE	0–1	Hanthawady United	Thuwunna Stadium, Yangon
16:00 UTC+06:30			Francis Emeka 90+2' (pen.)	Referee: U Khin Maung Soe

30/8/2020	Yadanarbon	1–3	Yangon United	YUSC Stadium, Yangon
16:00 UTC+06:30	Hlaing Bo Bo 77'		Kaung Htet Soe 15'; Barfo 60'; Abubakar 85'	Referee: U Win Kyaw Oo

30/8/2020	Southern Myanmar	1–1	Ayeyawady United	Padonmar Stadium, Yangon
15:30 UTC+06:30	Aung Myat Thu 22' (pen.)		Than Htet Aung 10'	Referee: U Soe Lin Aung

31/8/2020	Magwe	2–2	Rakhine United	YUSC Stadium, Yangon
16:00 UTC+06:30	Pyae Moe 7', 55'		Chan Oo 47', 84'	Referee: U Zaw Zaw

31/8/2020	Shan United	5–1	Sagaing United	Thuwunna Stadium, Yangon
16:00 UTC+06:30	Soulemanou 42' (o.g.); Shwe Ko 61'; Yakubu Abubakar 71'; Dway Ko Ko Chit 76', 78'		Edubat Patick 40'	Referee: U Thein Saw

=== Week 13 ===
3/9/2020	Southern Myanmar	0–1	Hanthawady United	YUSC Stadium, Yangon
16:00 UTC+06:30			Donald Bissa 75' (pen.)

3/9/2020	ISPE	1–0	Yadanarbon	Thuwunna Stadium, Yangon
16:00 UTC+06:30	Lin Htet Soe 55'

3/9/2020	Magwe	0–5	Ayeyawady United	Padonmar Stadium, Yangon
15:30 UTC+06:30			Than Htet Aung 21'; Kaung Myat Thu 74', 82'; Success 80'; Yar Zar Aung 84'

4/9/2020	Rakhin United	0–3	Shan United	YUSC Stadium, Yangon
16:00 UTC+06:30			Zin Min Tun 55'; Keith Martu Nah 81'; Dway Ko Ko Chit 89'

4/9/2020	Sagaing United	1–3	Yangon United	Thuwunna Stadium, Yangon
16:00 UTC+06:30	Myo Min Phyo 13'		Kaung Htet Soe 39'; Kyi Lin 41' (pen.); Zarni Htet 59'

=== Week 14 ===
7/9/2020	Sagaing United	0–1	Rakhine United	Salin Stadium, Yangon
16:00 UTC+06:30			Ti Nyein Minn 65'

7/9/2020	Shan United	4–2	Hanthawady United	Y.U.S.C Stadium, Yangon
16:00 UTC+06:30	Zwe Thet Paing 13'; Maximum 35' (pen.); Dway Ko Ko Chit 70'; Hein Phyo Win 86'		Donald Bissa 25' (pen.); Hein Htet Aung

7/9/2020	Yangon United	3–1	Magwe	Thuwunna Stadium, Yangon
15:30 UTC+06:30	Kaung Htet Soe 36'; Emmanuel Uzochukwu 56'; Barfo 88'		Pyae Moe 31'

8/9/2020	Yadanarbon	2–3	Ayeyawady United	YUSC Stadium, Yangon
16:00 UTC+06:30	Win Naing Soe 12', 48'		Success 16' (pen.), 53', 72'

8/9/2020	ISPE	0–0	Southern Myanmar	Thuwunna Stadium, Yangon
16:00 UTC+06:30

=== Week 15 ===
11/9/2020	Sagaing United	0–4	Hanthawady United	Thuwunna Stadium, Yangon
16:00 UTC+06:30			Myo Zaw Oo 9', 61'; Donald Bissa 32'; Francis Emeka 34'

11/9/2020	Shan United	5–2	Magwe	Padonmar Stadium, Yangon
16:00 UTC+06:30	Zin Min Tun 11', 14', 46'; David Htan 58'; Keith Martu Nah 83'		Naing Naing Kyaw 51'; Pyae Moe 84'

11/9/2020	Yadanarbon	3–1	Rakhine United	YUSC Stadium, Yangon
15:30 UTC+06:30	Win Naing Soe 50', 67'; Hlaing Bo Bo 54'		Ti Nyein Minn 69'

12/9/2020	Yangon United	3–0	Southern Myanmar	Thuwunna Stadium, Yangon
16:00 UTC+06:30	Kyi Lin 18' (pen.); Maung Maung Lwin 44'; Emmanuel 60'

12/9/2020	ISPE	0–5	Ayeywady United	YUSC Stadium, Yangon
15:30 UTC+06:30			Tin Win Aung 12'; Than Htet Aung 22'; Thiha Zaw 45+2'; Win Naing Tun 52'; Aung Naing Win 68' (pen.)

=== Week 16 ===
15/9/2020	Ayeyawady United	2–0	Sagaing United	Thuwunna Stadium, Yangon
16:00 UTC+06:30	Success 18', 84'

15/9/2020	Rakhine United	1–3	Hanthawady United	Padonmar Stadium, Yangon
16:00 UTC+06:30	Alexander 78'		Francis Emeka 39'; Donald Bissa 48'; Aung Kyaw Thu 63' (o.g.)

15/9/2020	Yadanarbon	3–0	Southern Myanmar	YUSC Stadium, Yangon
15:30 UTC+06:30	Win Naing Soe 14', 47'; Myat Kaung Khant 87'

16/9/2020	Shan United	4–0	Yangon United	Thuwunna Stadium, Yangon
16:00 UTC+06:30	Maximum 25'; Nanda Kyaw 37'; Keith Martu Nah 50' (pen.); Zin Min Tun 77'			Attendance: 0

16/9/2020	Magwe	2–0	ISPE	YUSC Stadium, Yangon
15:30 UTC+06:30	Pyae Moe 40'; Soe Lwin Lwin 43'

=== Week 17 ===
19/9/2020	Shan United	3–1	ISPE	Thuwunna Stadium, Yangon
16:00 UTC+06:30	Dway Ko Ko Chit 22', 90+1'; Ye Min Thu 40'		Khin Kyaw Win 39'

19/9/2020	Rakhine United	1–2	Ayeyawady United	Padonmar Stadium, Yangon
15:30 UTC+06:30	Ye Win Aung 55'		Thet Tun Aung 65' (o.g.); Soe Moe Kyaw 69'

19/9/2020	Hanthawady United	0–0	Yangon United	YUSC Stadium, Yangon
15:30 UTC+06:30

20/9/2020	Magwe	2–4	Yadanarbon	Thuwunna Stadium, Yangon
16:00 UTC+06:30	Naing Naing Kyaw 6'; Aung Zaw Myint 76'		Myo Ko Tun 4'; Win Naing Soe 14', 35'; Hlaing Bo Bo 69'

20/9/2020	Sagaing United	4–0	Southern Myanmar	YUSC Stadium, Yangon
15:30 UTC+06:30	Patrick 13', 30', 45+2', 60'

=== Week 18 ===
23/9/2020	Yadanarbon	1–3	Hanthawady United	Thuwunna Stadium, Yangon
16:00 UTC+06:30	Sithu Aung 31'		Emeka 39'; Hein Htet Aung 49', 56'

23/9/2020	Magwe	0–1	Southern Myanmar	YUSC Stadium, Yangon
15:30 UTC+06:30			Aung Myat Thu 67'

23/9/2020	Sagaing United	3–1	ISPE	Padonmar Stadium, Yangon
15:30 UTC+06:30	Patrick 17' (pen.), 47'; Friday 34'		Kyi Soe 77'

24/9/2020	Shan United	2–1	Ayeyawady United	Thuwunna Stadium, Yangon
16:00 UTC+06:30	Nanda Kyaw 4'; Zin Min Tun 64'		Thiha Zaw 59'

24/9/2020	Yangon United	0–0	Rakhine United	YUSC Stadium, Yangon
15:30 UTC+06:30

=== Week 19 ===
26/9/2020	Hanthawady United	2–4	Magwe	Thuwunna Stadium, Yangon
16:00 UTC+06:30	Aung Hlaing Win 21'; Donald Bissa 78' (pen.)		Aung Myint Tun 49', 61'; Soe Lwin Lwin 80'; Naing Naing Kyaw 89'

26/9/2020	Sagaing United	1–1	Yadanarbon	YUSC Stadium, Yangon
15:30 UTC+06:30	Pyaw Du Aung 65'		Aung Wunna Soe 58'

27/9/2020	Southern Myanmar	1–2	Shan United	YUSC Stadium, Yangon
15:30 UTC+06:30	Phone Myat Kyaw 19'		Zar Nay Ya Thu 37'; Maximum 57' (pen.)

27/9/2020	ISPE	3–1	Rakhine United	Thuwunna Stadium, Yangon
16:00 UTC+06:30	Kyi Soe 12', 59'; Wai Lin Aung 87' (pen.)		Nay Myo Aung 37'

27/9/2020	Yangon United	4–2	Ayeyawady United	YUSC Stadium, Yangon
15:30 UTC+06:30	Barfo 10', 53'; Kyi Lin 50'; Emmanuel 78'		Success 36' (pen.); Thiha Zaw 80'

=== Week 20 ===
29/9/2020	Magwe	4–1	Sagaing United	Thuwunna Stadium, Yangon
16:00 UTC+06:30	Naing Naing Kyaw 21'; Pyae Moe 26' (pen.), 48', 75'		Patrick Edubat 38'

30/9/2020	ISPE	1–6	Yangon United	YUSC Stadium, Yangon
15:30 UTC+06:30	Ban Htoung Kyae O 30'		Yan Naing Oo 12' (pen.); Aee Soe 29'; Kyi Lin 42'; Barfo 45', 58'; Soe Min Naing 84'

30/9/2020	Rakhine United	1–3	Southern Myanmar	Thuwunna Stadium, Yangon
15:30 UTC+06:30	Alexander 60'		Chan Nyein 46'; Phyo Paing Soe 57'; Aung Myat Thu 69' (pen.)

1/10/2020	Hantharwaddy United	2–2	Ayeyawady United	Thuwunna Stadium, Yangon
16:00 UTC+06:30	Myo Zaw Oo 22'; Aung Moe Htwe 2 42'		Success 4' (pen.); Ye Lin Htet 40'

1/10/2020	Shan United	2–0	Yadanarbon	YUSC Stadium, Yangon
15:30 UTC+06:30	Keith Martu Nah 36'; Nanda Kyaw 70'

== Results ==
Home \ Away	AYU	HTU	ISP	MAG	RKU	SAU	SHU	SMU	YAD	YGU
Ayeyawady United	—	1–0	2–1	0–0	4–0	2–0	1–0	2–1	1–1	1–0
Hantharwady United	2–2	—	4–0	2–4	1–0	1–0	2–1	5–0	4–1	0–0
ISPE	0–5	0–1	—	2–1	3–1	1–6	0–1	0–0	1–0	1–6
Magwe	0–5	0–3	2–0	—	2–2	4–1	1–1	0–1	2–4	0–6
Rakhine United	1–3	1–3	2–0	1–1	—	2–1	0–3	1–3	1–0	0–1
Sagaing United	1–6	0–4	3–1	4–0	0–1	—	1–2	4–0	1–1	1–3
Shan United	2–1	4–2	3–1	5–2	1–0	5–1	—	1–0	2–0	4–0
Southern Myanmar	1–1	0–1	1–1	1–2	0–1	2–3	1–2	—	1–1	0–1
Yadanarbon	2–3	1–3	4–0	4–1	3–1	1–1	1–3	3–0	—	1–3
Yangon United	4–2	1–3	2–0	3–1	0–0	2–0	2–2	3–0	2–2	—

First match(es) will be played: Jan 2020. Source:
Legend: Blue = home team win; Yellow = draw; Red = away team win.
For upcoming matches, an "a" indicates there is an article about the rivalry between the two participants.

== Season statistics ==
=== Top scorers ===
As of 1 October 2020.

Rank	Player	Club	Goals
1	(Nigeria) Raphael Success	Ayeyawady United	16
2	(Cameroon) Patrick Edubat	Sagaing United	14
3	(Nigeria) Francis Emeka	Hanthawady United	13
3	(Ivory Coast) Donald Bissa	Hanthawady United	13
5	(Myanmar) Win Naing Soe	Yadanarbon	10
6	(Myanmar) Pyae Moe	Magwe	9
7	(Nigeria) Emmanuel Uzochukwu	Yangon United	8
7	(Ghana) Ernest Barfo	Yangon United	8
9	(Myanmar) Zin Min Tun	Shan United	7
10	(Myanmar) Hein Htet Aung	Hanthawady United	6
10	(Myanmar) Dway Ko Ko Chit	Shan United	6
10	(Liberia) Keith Martu Nah	Shan United	6
10	(Myanmar) Nanda Kyaw	Shan United	6
10	(Myanmar) Myo Ko Tun	Yadanarbon	6
10	(Myanmar) Aung Thu	Yadanarbon	6
10	(Myanmar) Kyi Lin	Yangon United	6
15	(Myanmar) Than Htet Aung	Ayeyawady United	5
15	(Myanmar) Myo Zaw Oo	Hanthawady United	5
15	(Myanmar) Kyi Soe	I.S.P.E	5
15	(Myanmar) Aung Myat Thu	Southern Myanmar	5
20	(Myanmar) Kaung Myat Thu	Ayeyawady United	4
20	(Myanmar) Naing Naing Kyaw	Magwe	4
20	(Myanmar) Hlaing Bo Bo	Yadanarbon	4
20	(Myanmar) Kaung Myat Thu	Ayeyawady United	3
20	(Myanmar) Thiha Zaw	Ayeyawady United	3
20	(Myanmar) Kaung Myat Kyaw	Rakhine United	3
20	(Myanmar) Ti Nyein Minn	Rakhine United	3
20	(Nigeria) Barnabas Friday	Sagaing United	3
20	(Myanmar) Myo Min Phyo	Sagaing United	3
20	(Ivory Coast) Maximum	Shan United	3
20	(Myanmar) Maung Maung Lwin	Yangon United	3
20	(Myanmar) Kaung Htet Soe	Yangon United	3
30	(Myanmar) Win Naing Tun	Ayeyawady United	2
30	(Myanmar) Yar Zar Aung	Ayeyawady United	2
30	(Myanmar) Khin Kyaw Win	I.S.P.E	2
30	(Myanmar) Thein Zaw	Magwe	2
30	(Myanmar) Aung Myint Tun	Magwe	2
30	(Myanmar) Wai Yan Tun	Magwe	2
30	(Myanmar) Chan Oo	Rakhine United	2
30	(Ghana) Alexander	Rakhine United	2
30	(Myanmar) Kyaw Swar Min	Sagaing United	2
30	(Ghana) Yakubu Abubakar	Shan United	2
30	(Myanmar) Hein Phyo Win	Shan United	2
30	(Myanmar) David Htan	Shan United	2
30	(Burkina Faso) Ernest Aboubacar Congo	Yangon United	2
30	(Myanmar) Yan Naing Oo	Yangon United	2
30	(Japan) Shori Murata	Yangon United	2
46	(Myanmar) Tin Win Aung	Ayeyawady United	1
46	(Myanmar) Aung Naing Win	Ayeyawady United	1
46	(Myanmar) Ye Lin Htet	Ayeyawady United	1
46	(Zimbabwe) Victor Kamhuka	Ayeyawady United	1
46	(Myanmar) Aung Moe Htwe	Hanthawady United	1
46	(Myanmar) Aung Moe Htwe (2)	Hanthawady United	1
46	(Myanmar) Aung Myo Thura	Hanthawady United	1
46	(Myanmar) Aung Hlaing Win	Hanthawady United	1
46	(Myanmar) Zaw Moon Aung	I.S.P.E	1
46	(Myanmar) Wai Lin Aung	I.S.P.E	1
46	(Myanmar) Thant Zin Myint	I.S.P.E	1
46	(Myanmar) Lin Htet Soe	I.S.P.E	1
46	(Myanmar) Ban Htoung Kyae O	I.S.P.E	1
46	(Myanmar) Thiha	Magwe	1
46	(Myanmar) Soe Lwin Lwin	Magwe	1
46	(Myanmar) Aung Zaw Myint	Magwe	1
46	(Myanmar) Soe Lwin Lwin	Magwe	1
46	(Myanmar) Aung Thant Zaw	Rakhine United	1
46	(Myanmar) Min Ko Thu	Rakhine United	1
46	(Myanmar) Aung Kyaw Thu	Rakhine United	1
46	(Myanmar) Nay Myo Aung	Rakhine United	1
46	(Myanmar) Ye Win Aung	Rakhine United	1
46	(Myanmar) Zaw Lin Htet	Sagaing United	1
46	(Myanmar) Aung Hein Kyaw	Sagaing United	1
46	(Myanmar) Set Phyo Wai	Shan United	1
46	(Myanmar) Shwe Ko	Shan United	1
46	(Myanmar) Ye Min Thu	Shan United	1
46	(Myanmar) Zar Nay Ya Thu	Shan United	1
46	(Kyrgyzstan) Daniel Tagoe	Shan United	1
46	(Myanmar) Phone Myat Kyaw	Southern Myanmar	1
46	(Myanmar) Swan Htet Aung	Southern Myanmar	1
46	(Myanmar) Yan Kyaw Htwe	Southern Myanmar	1
46	(Myanmar) Chan Nyein	Southern Myanmar	1
46	(Myanmar) Phyo Paing Soe	Southern Myanmar	1
46	(Myanmar) Zaw Ye Tun	Yadanarbon	1
46	(Myanmar) Myat Kaung Khant	Yadanarbon	1
46	(Myanmar) Sithu Aung	Yadanarbon	1
46	(Myanmar) Zarni Htet	Yangon United	1
46	(Myanmar) Than Paing	Yangon United	1
46	(Myanmar) Aee Soe	Yangon United	1
46	(Myanmar) Soe Min Naing	Yangon United	1
46	(Myanmar) Yan Pai Soe	Yangon United	1
46	(Myanmar) Nyein Chan Aung	Yangon United	1

=== Most assists ===
As of 1 October 2020.

Rank	Player	Club	Assists
1	(Myanmar) Hein Htet Aung	Hanthawady United	9
1	(Myanmar) Lwin Moe Aung	Ayeyawady United	9
3	(Myanmar) Hlaing Bo Bo	Yadanarbon	6
3	(Myanmar) Maung Maung Lwin	Yangon United	6
4	(Ghana) Yakubu Abubakar	Shan United	5
5	(Nigeria) Raphael Success	Ayeyawady United	4
5	(Cameroon) Edubat Patrick	Sagaing United	4
5	(Myanmar) Myo Min Phyo	Sagaing United	4
5	(Myanmar) David Htan	Shan United	4
5	(Myanmar) Yan Kyaw Htwe	Southern Myanmar	4
5	(Myanmar) Win Naing Soe	Yadanarbon	4
9	(Myanmar) Thiha Zaw	Ayeyawady United	3
9	(Myanmar) Nan Wai Min	Hanthawady United	3
9	(Ivory Coast) Donald Bissa	Hanthawady United	3
9	(Nigeria) Francis Emeka	Hanthawady United	3
9	(Myanmar) Nay Moe Naing	Magwe	3
9	(Myanmar) Naing Naing Kyaw	Magwe	3
9	(Myanmar) Thiha	Magwe	3
9	(Myanmar) Zaw Zaw Naing	Rakhine United	3
9	(Myanmar) Zon Moe Aung	Sagaing United	3
9	(Myanmar) Toe Sat Naing	Sagaing United	3
9	(Myanmar) Nanda Kyaw	Shan United	3
9	(Myanmar) Hein Thiha Zaw	Shan United	3
9	(Myanmar) Myat Kaung Khant	Yadanarbon	3
9	(Myanmar) Nyein Chan Aung	Yangon United	3
18	(Myanmar) Zaw Win	Ayeyawady United	2
18	(Myanmar) Aung Naing Win	Ayeyawady United	2
18	(Myanmar) Lar Din Maw Yar	Hanthawady United	2
18	(Myanmar) Nyi Nyi Min	Magwe	2
18	(Myanmar) Pyae Moe	Magwe	2
18	(Myanmar) Zin Maung Maung	Magwe	2
18	(Myanmar) Kaung Htet Kyaw	Sagaing United	2
18	(Myanmar) Swan Htet Aung	Southern Myanmar	2
18	(Myanmar) Hein Phyo Win	Shan United	2
18	(Myanmar) Zwe Thet Paing	Shan United	2
18	(Myanmar) Htet Phyo Wai	Shan United	2
18	(Myanmar) Aung Thu	Yadanarbon	2
18	(Myanmar) Myo Ko Tun	Yadanarbon	2
18	(Myanmar) Ye Yint Aung II	Yadanarbon	2
33	(Myanmar) Zaw Lin	Ayeyawady United	1
33	(Myanmar) Ye Lin Htet	Ayeyawady United	1
33	(Myanmar) Nay Lin Tun	Ayeyawady United	1
33	(Myanmar) Win Naing Tun	Ayeyawady United	1
33	(Myanmar) Nyi Nyi Aung	Ayeyawady United	1
33	(Myanmar) Than Htet Aung	Ayeyawady United	1
33	(Ivory Coast) Kekere Moukailou	Hanthawady United	1
33	(Myanmar) Zaw Moon Aung	ISPE	1
33	(Myanmar) Kyi Soe	ISPE	1
33	(Myanmar) Soe Htet Win	ISPE	1
33	(Myanmar) Pyaw Du Aung	ISPE	1
33	(Myanmar) Hein Zayar Linn	Magwe	1
33	(Myanmar) Kyaw Thu Tun	Magwe	1
33	(Myanmar) Nay Myo Aung	Rakhine United	1
33	(Myanmar) Chan Oo	Rakhine United	1
33	(Myanmar) Hein Htet Zaw	Rakhine United	1
33	(Myanmar) Nay Thuya Aung	Rakhine United	1
33	(Myanmar) Ti Nyein Minn	Rakhine United	1
33	(Myanmar) Kyaw Swar Min	Sagaing United	1
33	(Myanmar) Aung Ko Ko Win	Sagaing United	1
33	(Myanmar) Tun Tun Aung	Sagaing United	1
33	(Myanmar) Aung Thant Zaw	Sagaing United	1
33	(Myanmar) Thant Zin Myint	Sagaing United	1
33	(Myanmar) Thet Tun Aung	Sagaing United	1
33	(Myanmar) Zaw Lin Htet	Sagaing United	1
33	(Myanmar) Sa Aung Pyae Ko	Shan United	1
33	(Myanmar) Phyo Nyi Nyi Lwin	Southern Myanmar	1
33	(Myanmar) Phyo Paing Soe	Southern Myanmar	1
33	(Myanmar) Aung Myat Thu	Southern Myanmar	1
33	(Myanmar) Sithu Aung	Yadanarbon	1
33	(Myanmar) Ent Maw Oo	Yadanarbon	1
33	(Myanmar) Zin Min Tun	Yangon United	1
33	(Burkina Faso) Ernest Aboubacar Congo	Yangon United	1
33	(Nigeria) Emmanuel Uzochukwu	Yangon United	1
33	(Myanmar) Zarni Htet	Yangon United	1
33	(Myanmar) Kaung Htet Soe	Yangon United	1
33	(Myanmar) Kyi Lin	Yangon United	1
33	(Myanmar) Min Kyaw Khant	Yangon United	1
33	(Myanmar) Thein Than Win	Yangon United	1
33	(Japan) Shori	Yangon United	1

=== Clean sheets ===
As of 1 Oct 2020.

Rank	Player	Club	Clean sheets
1	(Myanmar) Ko Ko Naing	Hanthawady United	9
2	(Myanmar) Kyaw Zin Phyo	Ayeyawady United	7
3	(Myanmar) Myo Min Latt	Shan United	6
4	(Myanmar) Kyaw Zin Htet	Yangon United	5
5	(Myanmar) Van Lal Hruaia	Rakhine United	4
6	(Myanmar) Sann Satt Naing	Yangon United	3
6	(Myanmar) Zin Nyi Nyi Aung	I.S.P.E	2
6	(Myanmar) Soe Arkar	Magwe	2
6	(Myanmar) A Zin Hmue	Sagaing United	2
6	(Myanmar) Pyae Phyo Aung	Southern Myanmar	2
6	(Myanmar) Pyae Lyan Aung	Yadanarbon	2
12	(Myanmar) Zar Chi Maung	Ayeyawady United	1
12	(Myanmar) Tay Zar Aung	Rakhine United	1

== Awards ==
=== Monthly awards ===
Month	Coach of the Month		Player of the Month		Reference
Month	Coach	Club	Player	Club	Reference
January	(Myanmar) Myo Min Tun	Hanthawady United	(Ivory Coast) Donald Bissa	Hanthawady United	
February	(Myanmar) Tin Maung Tun	Yangon United	(Myanmar) Maung Maung Lwin	Yangon United	
March & August	(Myanmar) Myo Min Tun	Hanthawady United	(Myanmar) David Htan	Shan United	
September	(Myanmar) Aung Naing	Shan United	(Myanmar) Hein Htet Aung	Hanthawady United	
September – October	(Myanmar) Aung Naing	Shan United	(Myanmar) Myo Min Latt	Shan United	

== See also ==
- 2020 MNL-2
