= 2019 Yangon United F.C. season =

Yangon United
2019 season
- Owner: (Myanmar) Tay Za
- Chairman: (Myanmar) Pyae Phyo Tayza
- Manager: (Myanmar) Tin Maung Tun
- Stadium: Yangon United Sports Complex
- 2019 Myanmar National League: 3rd
- 2019 General Aung San Shield: Champions

The 2019 season is Yangon United's 10th season in the Myanmar National League since 2009.

== Season Review ==
Period	Sportswear	Sponsor
2019	(Thailand) FBT	(Myanmar) AGD Bank

== 2019 First team squad ==
Note: Flags indicate national team as defined under FIFA eligibility rules; some limited exceptions apply. Players may hold more than one non-FIFA nationality.

No.	Pos.	Nation	Player
1	GK	MYA	Kyaw Zin Htet (Vice Captain)
2	DF	MYA	Min Ko Thu
3	DF	MYA	Pyae Phyo Zaw
4	MF	MYA	Yan Lin Aung
5	DF	MYA	Thein Zaw
6	MF	BRA	Vinicius Miller
7	MF	MYA	Nyein Chan Aung
8	FW	MYA	Soe Min Naing
9	FW	MYA	Than Paing
11	MF	MYA	Maung Maung Lwin
12	GK	MYA	Wai Lin Aung
14	DF	MYA	Nan Wai Min
15	FW	GUI	Sekou Sylla
16	DF	MYA	Thu Rein Soe
17	DF	MYA	Zarni Htet

No.	Pos.	Nation	Player
18	DF	MYA	Kyaw Swa Lin
19	MF	MYA	Kyaw Zin Oo
20	MF	JPN	Kosuke Uchida
21	MF	MYA	Nay Oo Lwin
22	DF	MYA	Min Kyaw Khant
23	DF	MYA	Pyae Phyo Aung
24	MF	MYA	Kaung Htet Soe
25	MF	MYA	Yan Aung Kyaw (Captain)
26	MF	MYA	Htoo Khant Lwin
27	FW	MYA	Aee Soe
28	MF	MYA	Thet Paing Soe
30	GK	MYA	Thura Kyaw
32	DF	NGA	Anderson West
34	DF	MYA	Thiha Zaw
75	GK	MYA	Sann Satt Naing

== Transfer ==
=== Transfer In ===
Note: Flags indicate national team as defined under FIFA eligibility rules; some limited exceptions apply. Players may hold more than one non-FIFA nationality.

No.	Pos.	Nation	Player
—	DF	MYA	Min Ko Thu (transfer from (Myanmar) Hanthawady United)
—	MF	MYA	Thet Paing Soe (transfer from Southern Myanmar)
—	MF	BRA	Vinicius Miller (transfer from (Brazil) Blumenau)

=== Transfer Out ===
Note: Flags indicate national team as defined under FIFA eligibility rules; some limited exceptions apply. Players may hold more than one non-FIFA nationality.

No.	Pos.	Nation	Player
—	DF	MYA	Zaw Min Tun (transfer to (Thailand) Chonburi)

== Coaching staff ==
Position	Staff
Head coach	(Myanmar) Tin Maung Tun
Manager	(Myanmar) Myint Thein
Assistant coach	(Myanmar) Myo Hlaing Oo (Myanmar) Thuya Swe
Goalkeeping coach	(Myanmar) Win Naing
Technical analyst	(Myanmar) Nyan Win

|} Source: Yangon United FC

=== Other information ===
Owner	(Myanmar) Tay Za
Chairman	(Myanmar) Pyae Phyo Tayza
Ground (capacity and dimensions)	Yangon United Sports Complex (3,500 / 103x67 metres)
Training Ground	Yangon United Sports Complex

== Competition ==
=== Myanmar National League ===
Pos	Team	Pld	W	D	L	GF	GA	GD	Pts	Qualification or relegation
1	Shan United (C)	22	12	10	0	45	21	+24	46	Qualification for AFC Champions League preliminary round 1 (Note: If the league champions cannot qualify for the AFC Champions League group stage, they will enter the AFC Cup group stage.)
2	Ayeyawady United	22	12	8	2	44	19	+25	44	
3	Yangon United	22	12	7	3	40	15	+25	43	Qualification for AFC Cup play-off round (Note: Yangon United qualified for the AFC Cup play-off round as General Aung San Shield winners.)
4	Yadanarbon	22	9	5	8	41	32	+9	32	
5	Hantharwady United	22	9	5	8	28	27	+1	32	

Source: MNL
Rules for classification: 1) Points; 2) Goal difference; 3) Goals scored.
(C) Champions
