= 2017 Yangon United F.C. season =

Yangon United
2017 season
- Owner: (Myanmar) Tay Za
- Chairman: (Myanmar) Pyae Phyo Tayza
- Manager: (Myanmar) U Tin Maung Tun
- Stadium: Yangon United Sports Complex
- Myanmar National League: 2nd
- Top goalscorer: (Nigeria) Emeka (8 goals)

In the 2017 season, the Burmese football club Yangon United F.C. finished in second position in the Myanmar National League.

== Season review ==
Period	Sportswear	Sponsor
2017	(Thailand) Grand Sport	(Myanmar) First National Insurance

== 2017 squad ==
Note: Flags indicate national team as defined under FIFA eligibility rules; some limited exceptions apply. Players may hold more than one non-FIFA nationality.

No.	Pos.	Nation	Player
1	GK	(Myanmar) MYA	Kyaw Zin Htet
3	DF	(Myanmar) MYA	Zaw Min Tun
4	DF	(Myanmar) MYA	David Htan
5	DF	(Myanmar) MYA	Thein Zaw
6	MF	(Myanmar) MYA	Kyaw Min Oo
7	MF	(Myanmar) MYA	Nyein Chan Aung
8	MF	(Myanmar) MYA	Kyi Lin
9	FW	(Myanmar) MYA	Than Paing
10	FW	(Myanmar) MYA	Kyaw Ko Ko
11	MF	(Myanmar) MYA	Zon Moe Aung
13	GK	(Myanmar) MYA	Min Thu
14	DF	(Myanmar) MYA	Nan Wai Min
15	DF	(Myanmar) MYA	Pyae Phyo Zaw
16	FW	(Myanmar) MYA	Saw Naing Moe Aung
17	DF	(Myanmar) MYA	Khin Maung Lwin (Captain)
18	MF	(Myanmar) MYA	Than Htet Aung

No.	Pos.	Nation	Player
19	MF	(Myanmar) MYA	Yan Lin Aung
20	MF	(Brazil) BRA	Emerson
22	DF	(Myanmar) MYA	Zarni Htet
23	DF	(Myanmar) MYA	Pyae Phyo Aung
24	MF	(Myanmar) MYA	Kyaw Htoo
25	MF	(Myanmar) MYA	Yan Aung Kyaw
27	DF	(Myanmar) MYA	Thiha Htet Aung
28	MF	(Myanmar) MYA	Min Kyaw Khant
29	MF	(Myanmar) MYA	Kyaw Zin Oo
30	FW	(Myanmar) MYA	Soe Min Naing
32	DF	(Myanmar) MYA	Thiha Zaw
33	GK	(Myanmar) MYA	Sann Satt Naing
44	DF	(Ivory Coast) CIV	Kekere Moukailou
59	MF	(Myanmar) MYA	Kaung Sett Naing
76	FW	(Brazil) BRA	César Augusto Hermenegildo

== Coaching staff ==
Position	Staff
Manager	(Myanmar) U Tin Maung Tun
Assistant Manager	(Myanmar) Myo Min Tun
Assistant Manager	(Myanmar) U Than Wai
Technical Coach	(Myanmar) U Nyan Win
Goalkeeper Coach	(Myanmar) U Win Naing
Fitness Coach	(Myanmar) U Zaw Naing

Source: Yangon United FC

=== Other information ===
Owner	(Myanmar) Tay Za
Chairman	(Myanmar) Pyae Phyo Tayza
Ground (capacity and dimensions)	Yangon United Sports Complex (3,500 / 103x67 metres)
Training Ground	Yangon United Sports Complex
