= 2020 Yangon United F.C. season =

Yangon United
2020 season
- Owner: (Myanmar) Tay Za
- Chairman: (Myanmar) Pyae Phyo Tayza
- Manager: (Myanmar) Tin Maung Tun
- Stadium: Yangon United Sports Complex

The 2020 season is Yangon United's 11th season in the Myanmar National League since 2009.

== Season Review ==
Period	Sportswear	Sponsor
2020	(Thailand) FBT	(Myanmar) AGD Bank

=== Current squad ===
As of 24 December 2019

Note: Flags indicate national team as defined under FIFA eligibility rules; some limited exceptions apply. Players may hold more than one non-FIFA nationality.

No.	Pos.	Nation	Player
1	GK	MYA	Kyaw Zin Htet (Vice Captain)
3	DF	MYA	Pyae Phyo Zaw
4	DF	MYA	Htike Htike Aung
5	DF	MYA	Thein Than Win
6	MF	MYA	Maung Maung Win
7	MF	MYA	Nyein Chan Aung
8	FW	MYA	Soe Min Naing
9	FW	MYA	Than Paing
10	MF	MYA	Aung Kyaw Naing
11	MF	MYA	Maung Maung Lwin
12	GK	MYA	Wai Lin Aung
14	DF	MYA	Kyaw Swar Linn
17	DF	MYA	Zarni Htet
18	GK	MYA	Thura Kyaw
19	MF	MYA	Kyaw Zin Oo

No.	Pos.	Nation	Player
20	MF	MYA	Kyi Lin
21	DF	MYA	Kar Lap
22	DF	MYA	Min Kyaw Khant
23	MF	MYA	Yan Pai Soe
24	MF	MYA	Kaung Htet Soe
25	MF	MYA	Yan Aung Kyaw (Captain)
26	MF	MYA	Htoo Khant Lwin
27	FW	MYA	Aee Soe
30	DF	MYA	Thu Rein Soe
32	DF	BFA	Ernest Aboubacar
33	MF	JPN	Shori Murata
44	FW	GHA	Ernest Barfo (on loan from Chabab Ghazieh)
75	GK	MYA	Sann Satt Naing
88	FW	NGA	Emmanuel Uzochukwu
—	FW	MYA	Zin Min Tun

== Transfer ==
=== Transfer In ===
Note: Flags indicate national team as defined under FIFA eligibility rules; some limited exceptions apply. Players may hold more than one non-FIFA nationality.

No.	Pos.	Nation	Player
—	MF	MYA	Maung Maung Win (transfer from (Myanmar) Zwekapin United)
—	MF	MYA	Aung Kyaw Naing (transfer from (Myanmar) Ayeyawady United)
—	DF	MYA	Htike Htike Aung (transfer from (Myanmar) Shan United)

=== Transfer Out ===
Note: Flags indicate national team as defined under FIFA eligibility rules; some limited exceptions apply. Players may hold more than one non-FIFA nationality.

No.	Pos.	Nation	Player
—	DF	MYA	Thein Zaw (transfer to (Myanmar) Magwe)
—	DF	MYA	Yan Lin Aung (transfer to (Myanmar) Magwe)

== Coaching staff ==
Position	Staff
Head coach	(Myanmar) Tin Maung Tun
Manager	(Myanmar) Myint Thein
Assistant coach	(Myanmar) Myo Hlaing Oo (Myanmar) Thuya Swe
Goalkeeping coach	(Myanmar) Win Naing
Technical analyst	(Myanmar) Nyan Win

|} Source: Yangon United FC

=== Other information ===
Owner	(Myanmar) Tay Za
Chairman	(Myanmar) Pyae Phyo Tayza
Ground (capacity and dimensions)	Yangon United Sports Complex (3,500 / 103x67 metres)
Training Ground	Yangon United Sports Complex
