= 2015 Yangon United F.C. season =

Yangon United
2015 season
- Owner: Tay Za
- Chairman: Pyae Phyo Tayza
- Manager: U Tin Maung Tun
- Stadium: Yangon United Sports Complex
- Myanmar National League: Champion
- Bogyoke Aung San Cup: loss in Second Round
- Top goalscorer: League: Cézar (28); All: Cézar (28)

== Season Review ==
Period	Sportswear	Sponsor
2015	(Thailand) Grand Sport	(Myanmar) First National Insurance

== Transfers ==
In: Note: Flags indicate national team as defined under FIFA eligibility rules; some limited exceptions apply. Players may hold more than one non-FIFA nationality.

No.	Pos.	Nation	Player
1	GK	BRA	Luiz Fernando (from (Cyprus) Doxa Katokopias)
3	DF	MYA	Zaw Min Tun (from (Myanmar) Yadanarbon)
5	DF	MYA	Latt Ko Ko Aye (from (Myanmar) Nay Pyi Taw)
6	DF	MYA	Nyein Chan Aung (from (Myanmar) Manawmye)
9	FW	MYA	Than Paing (from Youth Team)
12	DF	JPN	Seiji Kaneko (from (Thailand) Ang Thong)
26	MF	MYA	Thiha Zaw (from (Myanmar) Chin United)
27	DF	MYA	Thiha Htet Aung (from (Myanmar) Zeyashwemye)
30	GK	MYA	Nay Hlaing (from (Myanmar) Ayeyawady United)

Out: Note: Flags indicate national team as defined under FIFA eligibility rules; some limited exceptions apply. Players may hold more than one non-FIFA nationality.

No.	Pos.	Nation	Player
1	GK	MYA	Aung Phyo Wai
3	DF	MYA	Aung Zaw (loan return to (Myanmar) Hanthawaddy United)
5	DF	MKD	Aleksandar Vasilev (to (Myanmar) Zeyashwemye)
10	MF	MYA	Yaza Win Thein
12	DF	MYA	Thet Lwin Win (to (Myanmar) Ayeyawady United)
15	DF	MYA	Aung Thike (to (Myanmar) Zeyashwemye)
22	GK	MYA	Naing Zayar Tun (to (Myanmar) Nay Pyi Taw)
29	MF	MYA	Swam Htet Aung
30	GK	MYA	Pyae Phyo Oo
31	FW	MYA	Kaung Sat Naing (loan to (Myanmar) Magwe)
32	MF	MYA	Set Phyo Wai (loan to (Myanmar) Magwe)

== Squad ==
Note: Flags indicate national team as defined under FIFA eligibility rules; some limited exceptions apply. Players may hold more than one non-FIFA nationality.

No.	Pos.	Nation	Player
1	GK	BRA	Luiz Fernando
2	DF	MYA	Zarni Htet
3	DF	MYA	Zaw Min Tun
4	DF	MYA	David Htan
5	DF	MYA	Latt Ko Ko Aye
6	MF	MYA	Nyein Chan Aung
7	FW	MYA	Kyaw Ko Ko
8	MF	MYA	Kyi Lin
9	FW	MYA	Than Paing
11	MF	MYA	Aung Moe
12	DF	JPN	Seiji Kaneko
13	FW	BRA	Cézar
14	DF	MYA	Zaw Win
17	DF	MYA	Khin Maung Lwin (Captain)

No.	Pos.	Nation	Player
18	FW	MYA	Than Htet Aung
19	MF	MYA	Yan Naing Aung
20	FW	BRA	Emerson
21	MF	MYA	Zon Moe Aung
22	GK	MYA	Aung Phyo Wai
23	DF	MYA	Pyae Phyo Aung
24	MF	MYA	Kyaw Htoo
25	MF	MYA	Yan Aung Kyaw (vice-captain)
26	MF	MYA	Thiha Zaw
27	DF	MYA	Thiha Htet Aung
28	FW	MYA	Aung Kyaw Htwe
29	MF	MYA	Than Htut Aung
30	GK	MYA	Nay Hlaing
33	GK	MYA	Tay Zar Aung

== Coaching staff ==
Position	Staff
Manager	(Myanmar) U Tin Maung Tun
Assistant Manager	(Myanmar) Myo Min Tun
Assistant Manager	(Myanmar) U Than Wai
Assistant Manager	(Myanmar)
Assistant Manager	(Myanmar)
Goalkeeper Coach	(Myanmar) U Win Naing
Fitness Coach	(Myanmar) U Zaw Naing

Source: Yangon United FC

=== Other information ===
Owner	(Myanmar) Tay Za
Chairman	(Myanmar) Pyae Phyo Tayza
Ground (capacity and dimensions)	Yangon United Sports Complex (3,500 / 103x67 metres)
Training Ground	Yangon United Sports Complex

== Competitions ==
=== Myanmar National League ===
==== Results ====
11 January 2015 1	Yangon United	6 – 0	Rakhine United	Yangon
	Thu 20' (o.g.); Emerson 60'; Cézar 71', 83', 89'; Khin Maung Lwin 82'	Summary		Stadium: Yangon United Sports Complex

17 January 2015 2	Yangon United	1 – 0	Hanthawaddy United	Yangon
	Cézar 33'	Summary		Stadium: Yangon United Sports Complex

25 January 2015 3	Yangon United	3 – 0	Zwegabin United	Yangon
	Cézar 6', 69'; Zuparic 20' (o.g.)	Summary		Stadium: Yangon United Sports Complex

31 January 2015 4	Chin United	0 – 2	Yangon United	Chin State
		Summary	Kyaw Ko Ko 42'; Cézar 87'	Stadium: Har Kharr Stadium

7 February 2015 5	Nay Pyi Taw	1 – 2	Yangon United	Pyinmana
	Goal	Summary	Kaneko 55'; Cézar 87'	Stadium: Paung Laung Stadium

14 February 2015 6	Yangon United	5 – 2	Manawmye	Yangon
	Cézar 8', 50', 90+2'; Ko 66'; Emerson 68'	Summary	Goal	Stadium: Yangon United Sports Complex

21 February 2015 7	Magwe	2 – 3	Yangon United	Magway
	H.H. Aung 20'; Naing 79' (pen.)	Summary	Kyaw Ko Ko 26'; Cézar 39'; Than Htet Aung 90'	Stadium: Magway Stadium

1 March 2015 8	Kanbawza	1 – 3	Yangon United	Taunggyi
	B.Arif 47'	Summary	Kyi Lin 31', 65'; Kyaw Ko Ko 62'	Stadium: Taunggyi Stadium

8 March 2015 9	Yangon United	5 – 2	Zeyashwemye	Yangon
	Cézar 23', 43', 69'; Khin Maung Lwin 39'; Emerson 59'	Summary	Ridrigo 34' (pen.), 73'	Stadium: Yangon United Sports Complex

27 June 2015 10	Yangon United	2 – 1	Ayeyawady United	Yangon
	Zaw Min Tun 41'; Cézar 47'	Summary	Kyaw Min Oo 8'	Stadium: Yangon United Sports Complex

5 July 2015 11	Yadanarbon	2 – 3	Yangon United	Mandalay
	Aung Thu 20'; Shine Thura 66'	Summary	Kyi Lin 31'; Cézar 51'; Emerson 58'	Stadium: Bahtoo Stadium

17 July 2015 12	Hanthawaddy United	2 – 3	Yangon United	Taungoo
	A.M.Thura 84'; Ousmanou 89'	Summary	Emerson 20', 32'; Kyaw Ko Ko 23'	Stadium: Bago Stadium

25 July 2015 13	Ayeyawady United	2 – 2	Yangon United	Pathein
	Naumov 18', 38'	Summary	Cézar 90+3' (pen.); Than Htet Aung 90+6'	Stadium: Kyaut Tie Stadium

8 August 2015 14	Yangon United	3 – 1	Nay Pyi Taw	Yangon
	Cézar 36', 55'; Kyaw Ko Ko 43'	Summary	A.M.Khant 82'	Stadium: Yangon United Sports Complex

15 August 2015 15	Manawmye	0 – 1	Yangon United	Myitkyina
		Summary	Cézar 18'	Stadium: Swomprabon Stadium

23 August 2015 16	Yangon United	–	Kanbawza	Yangon
		[ Summary]		Stadium: Yangon United Sports Complex

13 September 2015 17	Rakhine United	1 – 2	Yangon United	Sittwe
	Pyi Moe 28'	http://www.futbol24.com/match/2015/01/15/national/Myanmar/Myanmar-National-League/2015/Rakhine-Utd/vs/Yangon-Utd/[ Summary]	Kyaw Ko Ko 13'; Cézar 17'	Stadium: Wai Thar Li Stadium

18 September 2015 18	Yangon United	2 – 3	Yadanarbon	Yangon
	Kyaw Ko Ko 14'; Zaw Min Tun 75'	[ Summary]	Aung Thu 23'; Ye Ko Oo 33'; Myo Ko Tun 58'	Stadium: Yangon United Sports Complex

23 September 2015 19	Yangon United	2 – 3	Magwe	Yangon
	Cézar 1'; Khin Maung Lwin 29'	[ Summary]	Nanda Kyaw 27', 54'; Sylla 57'	Stadium: Yangon United Sports Complex

30 September 2015 16	Yangon United	2 – 0	Kanbawza	Yangon
	Kyaw Ko Ko 14'; Cézar 69'	[ Summary]		Stadium: Yangon United Sports Complex

17 October 2015 20	Zeyashwemye	1 – 1	Yangon United	Monywa
	Victor 60'	[ Summary]	Kyaw Ko Ko 66'	Stadium: Monywa Stadium

25 October 2015 21	Zwegabin United	2–2	Yangon United	Naypyidaw
	Sai Min Tun 6'; Thein Zaw 35'	[ Summary]	Kyaw Ko Ko 9'; Than Paing 71'	Stadium: Wunna Theikdi Stadium

30 October 2015 22	Yangon United	6 – 2	Chin United	Yangon
15:30	César Augusto 27', 51', 54', 58', 88'; Than Paing 84'	[ Summary]	Idoko Sunday Mathew 68', 82'	Stadium: Yangon United Sports Complex

=== Bogyoke Aung San Cup ===
12 July 2015 2nd Round	GFA	1 – 0	Yangon United	Yangon
	Micheal 59'	[ Summary]		Stadium: Bogyoke Aung San Stadium

== Squad statistics ==
=== Goal scorers ===
As of match played 13 September 2015

Place	Position	Nation	Number	Name	Myanmar National League	Bogyoke Aung San Cup	Total
1	FW	(Brazil)	13	Cézar	28	0	28
2	FW	(Myanmar)	7	Kyaw Ko Ko	12	0	12
3	FW	(Brazil)	20	Emerson	6	0	6
4	MF	(Myanmar)	8	Kyi Lin	3	0	3
4	DF	(Myanmar)	17	Khin Maung Lwin	3	0	3
5	FW	(Myanmar)	18	Than Htet Aung	2	0	2
5	DF	(Myanmar)	3	Zaw Min Tun	2	0	2
5	FW	(Myanmar)	3	Than Paing	2	0	2
5				Own goal	2	0	2
9	DF	(Japan)	12	Seiji Kaneko	1	0	1
				TOTALS	62	0	62
