= 2018 Yangon United season =

Yangon United
2018 season
- Owner: Tay Za
- Chairman: Mr. Pyae Phyo Tayza
- Manager: Mr. Myo Min Tun
- Stadium: Yangon United Sports Complex

The 2018 season is Yangon United's 9th season in the Myanmar National League since 2009.

== Season Review ==
Period	Sportswear	Sponsor
2018	(Thailand) FBT	(Myanmar) AGD Bank

== 2018 First team squad ==
Note: Flags indicate national team as defined under FIFA eligibility rules; some limited exceptions apply. Players may hold more than one non-FIFA nationality.

No.	Pos.	Nation	Player
1	GK	MYA	Kyaw Zin Htet
2	DF	MYA	Zarni Htet
3	DF	MYA	Pyae Phyo Zaw
5	DF	MYA	Thein Zaw
6	MF	MYA	Yan Lin Aung
7	MF	MYA	Nyein Chan Aung
10	MF	MYA	Kyi Lin (Vice Captain)
11	MF	MYA	Maung Maung Lwin
12	GK	MYA	Wai Lin Aung
13	GK	MYA	Min Thu
14	DF	MYA	Nan Wai Min
15	FW	GUI	Sekou Sylla
16	DF	MYA	Thu Rein Soe
18	MF	MYA	Zin Ko

No.	Pos.	Nation	Player
19	MF	MYA	Kyaw Zin Oo
20	MF	JPN	Kosuke Uchida
22	MF	MYA	Min Kyaw Khant
23	DF	MYA	Pyae Phyo Aung
25	MF	MYA	Yan Aung Kyaw (Captain)
26	MF	MYA	Htoo Khant Lwin
27	FW	MYA	Aee Soe
31	MF	MYA	Kyaw Htoo
32	DF	MYA	Zaw Min Tun
44	DF	CIV	Kekere Moukailou
75	GK	MYA	Sann Satt Naing
77	MF	MYA	Kyaw Min Oo
88	FW	NGA	Uzochukwu Emmanuel

== Continental record ==
Season	Competition	Round	Club	Home	Away	Aggregate
2018	AFC Cup	Group G	(Indonesia) Bali United	3–2	3–1	
2018	AFC Cup	Group G	(Philippines) Global Cebu	3–0	1–2	
2018	AFC Cup	Group G	(Vietnam) FLC Thanh Hóa	2–1	3-3	

== Transfer ==
=== In ===
- Uzochukwu Emmanuel - from GFA F.C.
- Kosuke Uchida - from (Indonesia) Persela Lamongan
- Maung Maung Lwin - from Hantharwady United
- Suan Lam Mang - from Chin United
- Sekou Sylla - from Magway
- Aee Soe - from Yangon United Youth team
- Zin Ko - from Yangon United Youth team
- Kyaw Zin Oo - from Yangon United Youth team

=== Out ===
- Kaung Sett Naing - to (Thailand) Samut Sakhon F.C.
- Kyaw Ko Ko - to (Thailand) Chiangrai United
- Yankha - to Hantharwady United
- Thiha Zaw - to Sagaing United
- Saw Naing Moe Aung - to Hantharwady United
- David Htan - to Shan United
- Zon Moe Aung - to Zwegapin United
- Suan Lam Mang - to Shan United
- Thiha Htet Aung - to Zwegapin United

== Honour ==
- 2018 MFF Charity Cup ---> Champion

== Coaching staff ==
Position	Staff
Manager	(Myanmar) Mr. Myo Min Tun
Assistant manager	(Myanmar) Mr. Tin Maung Tun
Assistant manager	(Myanmar) U Than Wai
Technical coach	(Myanmar) U Nyan Win
Goalkeeper Coach	(Myanmar) U Win Naing
Fitness Coach	(Myanmar) U Zaw Naing

Source: Yangon United FC

=== Other information ===
Owner	(Myanmar) Tay Za
Chairman	(Myanmar) Pyae Phyo Tayza
Ground (capacity and dimensions)	Yangon United Sports Complex (3,500 / 103x67 metres)
Training Ground	Yangon United Sports Complex
