= 2019 General Aung San Shield final =

MFF Cup
- Event: General Aung San Shield
| Shan United | Yangon United |
| 2 | 2 |
- Date: 24 September 2019
- Venue: Thuwunna Stadium, Yangon
- Man of the Match: (Guinea) Sylla Sekou
- Referee: U Soe Lin Aung
- Attendance: 11,345
- Weather: Sunny; 28 °C (82 °F)

The 2019 General Aung San Shield final is the 9th final of the MFF Cup. The General Aung San Shield winner will qualify to AFC Cup competition. The match was contested by Shan United and Yangon United at Thuwunna Stadium in Yangon. The match will play on 21 September 2019 and was the final match of the Bogyoke Aung San Cup.

== Background ==
It is Shan United's second times General Aung San Shield final. Last time, they won against Yangon United in 2017 General Aung San Shield.

Yangon United were playing a record 5th MFF Cup final. They had previously won against Hanthawaddy United in 2018 General Aung San Shield final.

== Ticket allocation ==
Both Shan United and Yangon United received a ticket allocation of 10,000 for the game. Ticket prices were Ks.1,000/- (Normal Ticket) and Ks.2,000/- (Special Ticket).

== Route to the Final ==
=== Shan United ===
| Round | Opposition | Score |
|---|---|---|
| 2nd | Myawady | 2–0 |
| QF | Hanthawady United | 2–1 |
| SF | Rakhine United | 4–0/0–1 (h/a) |
Key: (h) = Home venue; (a) = Away venue; (n) = Neutral venue.

=== Yangon United ===
| Round | Opposition | Score |
|---|---|---|
| QF | Southern Myanmar | 0–0 (5–4.p) |
| SF | Sagaing United | 3–1/1–1 (h/a) |
Key: (h) = Home venue; (a) = Away venue; (n) = Neutral venue.

== Match ==
=== Details ===
24 September 2019
17:00 MST

| Shan United | 3-4 (a.e.t) | Yangon United |
|---|---|---|
| Zin Min Tun 8'; Zwe Thet Paing 56'; Emmanuel Uzochukwu 111' | Report; News; Highlight; Full match | Sylla Sekou 51', 116'; Soe Min Naing 90+1'; Min Kyaw Khant 103' |

Thuwunna Stadium, Yangon
Attendance: 11,345
Referee: U Soe Lin Aung

| Shan United | Yangon United |

| GK | 18 | (Myanmar) Phone Thit Sar Min |
| RB | 4 | (Myanmar) David Htan (c) |
| CB | 35 | (Nigeria) William Nyakwe |
| CB | 6 | (Myanmar) Nanda Kyaw |
| LB | 5 | (Myanmar) Hein Thiha Zaw |
| CM | 14 | (Japan) Reo Nakamura | | | (substituted off) 53' |
| CM | 88 | (Ivory Coast) Maximin Djawa | | (yellow card) 54' |
| RW | 11 | (Myanmar) Yan Naing Oo | | | (substituted off) 53' |
| LW | 19 | (Myanmar) Shwe Ko | | (yellow card) 38' |
| CF | 8 | (Myanmar) Zin Min Tun | 8' | | (substituted off) 68' |
| CF | 61 | (Myanmar) Htet Phyo Wai |
Substitutes:
| GK | 1 | (Myanmar) Thiha Sithu |
| DF | 3 | (Myanmar) Htike Htike Aung |
| FW | 10 | (Nigeria) Emmanuel Uzochukwu | 111' | | (substituted in) 53' |
| MF | 12 | (Myanmar) Suan Lam Mang |
| DF | 16 | (Myanmar) Zwe Thet Paing | 56' | | (substituted in) 53' |
| MF | 17 | (Myanmar) Aung Show Thar Maung | | (yellow card) 97' | (substituted in) 68' |
| FW | 77 | (Myanmar) Dway Ko Ko Chit |
Manager:
(Myanmar) Aung Naing

| GK | 1 | (Myanmar) Kyaw Zin Htet (c) |
| RB | 26 | (Myanmar) Htoo Khant Lwin | | | (substituted off) 70' |
| CB | 32 | (Nigeria) Anderson West |
| CB | 3 | (Myanmar) Pyae Phyo Zaw |
| LB | 22 | (Myanmar) Min Kyaw Khant | 103' | (yellow card) 80' |
| CM | 7 | (Myanmar) Nyein Chan Aung | | | (substituted off) 77' |
| CM | 25 | (Myanmar) Yan Aung Kyaw | | (yellow card) 15' |
| RM | 11 | (Myanmar) Maung Maung Lwin |
| LM | 24 | (Myanmar) Kaung Htet Soe |
| CF | 15 | (Guinea) Sylla Sekou | 51', 116' |
| CF | 9 | (Myanmar) Than Paing | | (yellow card) 32' | (substituted off) 71' |
Substitutes:
| GK | 75 | (Myanmar) Sann Satt Naing |
| FW | 8 | (Myanmar) Soe Min Naing | 90+1' | | (substituted in) 71' |
| DF | 16 | (Myanmar) Thu Rein Soe |
| DF | 17 | (Myanmar) Zarni Htet | | | (substituted in) 70' |
| DF | 18 | (Myanmar) Kyaw Swar Lin |
| FW | 27 | (Myanmar) Aee Soe | | | (substituted in) 77' |
| DF | 34 | (Myanmar) Thiha Zaw |
Manager:
(Myanmar) Tin Maung Tun

Man of the match

- (Guinea) Sylla Sekou

Match officials

- Assistant referees:
  - (Myanmar)
  - (Myanmar)
  - (Myanmar)
  - (Myanmar)
- Fourth official: (Myanmar)
- Reserve official: (Myanmar)
- Match Commissioner: (Myanmar) Kyaw Myo Aung

Match rules

- 90 minutes.
- 30 minutes of extra-time if necessary.
- Penalty shoot-out if scores still level.
- Seven named substitutes.
- Maximum of three substitutions.

=== Statistics ===
| Statistic | Shan United | Yangon United |
|---|---|---|
| Goals scored | 2 | 2 |
| Possession | 46 | 54 |
| Shots on target | 9 | 10 |
| Shots off target | 7 | 9 |
| Corner kicks | 7 | 11 |
| Fouls | 14 | 21 |
| Offsides | 2 | 1 |
| Yellow cards | 3 | 3 |
| Red cards | 0 | 0 |

== Winner ==
2019 General Aung San Shield
Winners
Yangon United
Third Title

=== Prizes for winner ===
- A champion trophy.
- Ks.3,00,00,000/- prize money.

=== Prizes for runners-up ===
- Ks.150,00,000/- prize money.

== Broadcasting rights ==
These matches will be broadcast live on Myanmar television:

| Final Round | Shan United vs Yangon United |
|---|---|
| Free to Air | MWD & MWD Variety & Fortune TV |
| Live Stream | My Sports |
