= 2021 Myanmar National League =

Myanmar National League
- Season: 2021
- Dates: April 2021 to September 2021 (cancelled)

The 2021 Myanmar National League season was the intended 12th edition of top tier Myanmar National League annual football, the top Myanmar professional league for association football clubs, since its establishment in 2009.

Shan United were the defending champions. Magwe and Southern Myanmar were disbanded after 2020 Myanmar National League season. However, due to political crisis in Myanmar that occurred later, the league was cancelled.

== 2021 MNL Meeting ==
President of Myanmar Football Federation for this year's Myanmar National League football season. A video conferencing meeting of the Myanmar National League Committee consisting of the Chairman of the Myanmar National League Committee and the owners / chairmen of MNL Clubs was held this morning. According to the unanimous decision of the meeting, the 2021 MPT MNL-1 football tournament was scheduled to be held from April to September, depending on the outbreak of the COVID-19 virus in 2021. In the 2021 MNL season, Shan United, Hantharwady United, Ayeyawady United, Yangon United, Yadanarbon, Rakhine United, Sagaing United, ISPE FC, including Chinland FC and Myawaddy FC, which were allowed to qualify under MNL Regulations, have decided to hold the tournament with a total of 10 teams. However, ongoing 2021 Myanmar protest had caused concern on the perpetration of the league, with several fans and players joining the movement, thus officially cancelling the league.

== Changes from last season ==
=== Team changes ===
==== Promoted Clubs ====
Promoted from the 2020 MNL-2

- Chinland
- Myawady

==== Relegated Clubs ====
Relegated from the 2020 Myanmar National League

- Chin United F.C.
- Southern Myanmar F.C.
- Magwe F.C.
- Zwekapin United F.C.

== Clubs ==
=== Foreign players ===
Club	Player 1	Player 2	Player 3	Asian Player	Former
Ayeyawady United				(China) Wu Hongbo	
Chinland		(Sudan) Jamal Khamees Gomaa	(Republic of Ireland) Séamus McGuff	(Indonesia) Syafiq Fairuz	
Hantharwady United		(Ivory Coast) Kekere Moukailou	(Ivory Coast) Donald Bissa	(Tajikistan) Fatkhullo Ibrogimzoda	
I.S.P.E				(Singapore) Bayram Aziful Rahim	
Myawady					
Sagaing United					
Shan United	(Ivory Coast) Djawa Maximin	(Nigeria) Raphael Success			
Rakhine United					
Yadanarbon					
Yangon United	(Brazil) Emerson	(Cameroon) Ella Edubat			

== Stadiums and location (2021) ==
=== Stadium ===
Locations of the 2021 Myanmar National League

Club	Home City	Stadium	Capacity
Ayeyawady United	Pathein	Ayar Stadium	6,000
Chinland	Hakha	Hakha Stadium *	4,000
Hantharwady United	Bago	Grand Royal Stadium	4,000
I.S.P.E	Mandalay	Mandalarthiri Stadium	30,000
Myawady	Nay Pyi Taw	Wunna Theikdi Stadium	30,000
Rakhine United	Sittwe	Weithali Stadium	7,000
Sagaing United	Monywa	Monywa Stadium	5,000
Shan United	Taunggyi	Taunggyi Stadium	7,000
Yadanarbon	Mandalay	Bahtoo Stadium	17,000
Yangon United	Yangon	Yangon United Sports Complex	3,500

(*) – not ready to play. MNL clubs that have not had their home stadia ready to host home matches currently use Aung San Stadium and Thuwunna Stadium in Yangon.

=== Personnel and sponsoring ===
Note: Flags indicate national team as has been defined under FIFA eligibility rules. Players may hold more than one non-FIFA nationality.

Team	Head coach	Captain	Kit manufacturer	Shirt sponsor
Ayeyawady United	Myo Hlaing Win			
Chinland				
Hantharwady United	Myo Min Tun			
I.S.P.E				
Myawady				
Rakhine United				
Sagaing United	Zaw Linn Tun			
Shan United	Han Win Aung			
Yadanarbon	Aung Kyaw Moe			
Yangon United	Min Tun Lin			

== See also ==
- 2021 MNL-2
