= Wai Lin Aung =

Wai Lin Aung or Wai Linn Aung may refer to:

- Wai Lin Aung (footballer, born 1996), Burmese football goalkeeper
- Wai Lin Aung (footballer, born 1999), Burmese football midfielder
