= Aung Myat Thu =

Burmese footballer

Personal information
- Full name: Aung Myat Thu
- Date of birth: 25 April 1994 (age 32)
- Place of birth: Letpadan, Bago, Myanmar
- Height: 1.68 m (5 ft 6 in)
- Position: Striker

Team information
- Current team: Hantharwady United
- Number: 19

Youth career
- 2013: Kanbawza youth team

Senior career*
Years	Team	Apps	(Gls)
2014–2017	Mountain Lions		
2017	Nay Pyi Taw	0	(0)
2018	Chin United	14	(11)
2019–2020	Southern Myanmar	15	(8)
2021–	Hantharwady United	14	(11)

International career^{‡}
2023–	Myanmar		
- * Club domestic league appearances and goals as of 24 October 2023 ‡ National team caps and goals as of 21 November 2023

Aung Myat Thu (Burmese: အောင်မြတ်သူ; born 25 April 1994) is a Burmese footballer who plays as a striker for Hantharwady United.

== See also ==
- Profile detail on Facebook
