= Pyae Phyo Aung (footballer, born 1991) =

Burmese footballer (born 1991)

Personal information
- Full name: Pyae Phyo Aung
- Date of birth: 8 July 1991 (age 35)
- Place of birth: Myanmar
- Height: 1.78 m (5 ft 10 in)
- Position: Goalkeeper

Team information
- Current team: Shan United
- Number: 30

Senior career*
Years	Team	Apps	(Gls)
2009–2020	Southern Myanmar		
2021–2023	Hanthawaddy United		
2024	Yangon United		
2025–	Shan United		

International career^{‡}
2013–	Myanmar U23	4	(0)
2012–	Myanmar	1	(0)
- * Club domestic league appearances and goals ‡ National team caps and goals as of 20 May 2015

Pyae Phyo Aung (Burmese: ပြည့်ဖြိုးအောင်; born 8 July 1991) is a Burmese professional footballer who plays as a goalkeeper for the Myanmar national football team.

He currently plays for Southern Myanmar in Myanmar National League.
