= Raphael Success =

Nigerian footballer

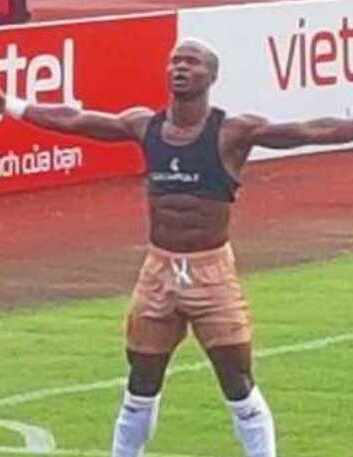
- Success celebrating a goal with Hanoi Police in 2023

Personal information
- Full name: Akwa Raphael Success
- Date of birth: 10 March 1998 (age 28)
- Place of birth: Uyo, Nigeria
- Height: 1.73 m (5 ft 8 in)
- Position: Winger

Team information
- Current team: Zhetysu
- Number: 74

Youth career
- NAF Rockets

Senior career*
Years	Team	Apps	(Gls)
2018–2020	Ayeyawady United	38	(25)
2021	Shan United		
2021–2023	Police Tero	1	(0)
2021	→ Kasetsart (loan)	16	(2)
2023–2024	Hanoi Police	10	(5)
2023–2024	→ Sông Lam Nghệ An (loan)	11	(0)
2025–	Zhetysu	10	(5)
- * Club domestic league appearances and goals as of 2 November 2025

Akwa Raphael Success (born 10 March 1998) is a Nigerian professional footballer who plays as a winger for Kazakhstan Premier League club Zhetysu.

== Honours ==
Ayeyawady United

- Myanmar National League runner-up: 2019

Hanoi Police

- V.League 1: 2023

Individual

- Myanmar National League top scorer: 2020
