= Luiz Fernando (footballer, born February 1988) =

Brazilian footballer

Personal information
- Full name: Luiz Fernando Pongelupe Machado
- Date of birth: 20 February 1988 (age 38)
- Place of birth: São Paulo, Brazil
- Height: 1.87 m (6 ft 1 1/2 in)
- Position: Goalkeeper

Team information
- Current team: Santa Cruz
- Number: 1

Youth career
- 1994–2008: Corinthians

Senior career*
Years	Team	Apps	(Gls)
2008–2011	Red Bull Brasil	103	(0)
2011	Boa Esporte	12	(0)
2011–2012	Red Bull Brasil	11	(0)
2012	Marília	12	(0)
2014	Red Bull Brasil	10	(0)
2014	Doxa Katokopias	3	(0)
2015–2016	Yangon United	55	(0)
2016–2017	EC Democrata	12	(0)
2018–2019	XV de Piracicaba	38	(0)
2020–	Santa Cruz	1	(0)
- * Club domestic league appearances and goals as of 04:55, 20 October 2014 (UTC)

Luiz Fernando Pongelupe Machado (born 20 February 1988), simply known as Luiz Fernando is a Brazilian professional footballer who plays for Santa Cruz as a goalkeeper.

== Club career ==
Fernando spent 14 years at the Corinthians. After being released by the club, he joined Red Bull Brasil. He made his 100th appearance for the club against Rio Branco-SP. In that season, he went 316 minutes without conceding a goal. In the match against Rio Branco, he made "two great saves". After playing for a number of clubs as well as returning to his former club, Fernando embraced Cypriot football with Doxa Katokopias in 2014.

On 11 January 2015, he embraced Asian football signing for Yangon United of Myanmar.
