= 2021 MNL-2 =

MNL-2
- Season: 2021
- Dates: May–August 2021

The 2021 National League 2, also known as the 2021 MPT Myanmar National League 2, is the ninth season of the MNL-2, the second division league for association football clubs since its founding in 2012.

It has been held with a total of eight teams. Dagon registered to play again in 2021 MNL-2 season.

== Clubs ==
=== Stadiums ===
| Club | Home City | Stadium | Capacity |
|---|---|---|---|
| Dagon FC | Nay Pyi Taw | Wunna Theikdi Stadium | 30,000 |
| Myanmar University F.C. | Yangon | University Stadium | 1,000 |
| Kachin United | Kachin | Myitkyina Stadium | 4,000 |
| Mawlamyine City | Mawlamyine | Mawlamyine Stadium | 20,000 |
| Mawyawadi FC | Lashio | Lashio Stadium | |
| Silver Stars FC | Yangon | Thuwunna Stadium | 30,000 |
| Junior Lions | Yangon | Thuwunna Stadium | 30,000 |
| Yaw Myay FC | Magwe | Magwe Stadium | |
