= Myo Min Phyo =

Burmese footballer

Personal information
- Full name: Myo Min Phyo
- Date of birth: 2 November 1999 (age 26)
- Place of birth: Sittwe, Myanmar
- Height: 1.70 m (5 ft 7 in)
- Position: Winger

Team information
- Current team: Dagon Port

Youth career
- 2017: Ayeyawady United Youth Team

Senior career*
Years	Team	Apps	(Gls)
2017–2023	Sagaing United	92	(3)
2024–	Dagon Port		

International career^{‡}
2019–2023	Myanmar U23		
- * Club domestic league appearances and goals as of 22 October 2023 ‡ National team caps and goals as of 23 April 2020

Myo Min Phyo (Burmese: မျိုးမင်းဖြိုး; born 2 November 1999) is a Burmese footballer who plays as a left winger for Sagaing United.
