= Francis Emeka =

Nigerian player

Oguwike Emeka
Personal information
- Full name: Oguwike Emeka
- Date of birth: 24 November 1990 (age 35)
- Place of birth: Ibadan, Nigeria
- Height: 1.86 m (6 ft 1 in)
- Position: Forward

Youth career
- Aonike Academy

Senior career*
| Years | Team | Apps | (Gls) |
| 2012 | Nam Dinh | 20 | (8) |
| 2013 | Dong Thap | 17 | (5) |
| 2013–2014 | Ho Chi Minh City | 21 | (10) |
| 2014–2015 | Eastern Star | 15 | (8) |
| 2015 | NUOL | 9 | (23) |
| 2016–2017 | Yangon United | 12 | (12) |
| 2019–2020 | Hanthawaddy United | 10 | (13) |
- * Club domestic league appearances and goals

Oguwike Emeka (born 24 November 1990) is a Nigerian professional footballer who plays as a forward.

== Career ==
=== Early years ===
Emeka started his career at Aonike Academy at the age of five and transferred to Vietnamese club Nam Định F.C. in 2012. He then played for Đồng Tháp F.C. and Ho Chi Minh FC, for one season each. He moved to Lao club Eastern Star FC for one season and transferred to NUOL, scoring 23 goals.

=== Yangon United ===
Emeka signed for Yangon united in December 2016. He played his first match for the club on 15 January 2017 against Magwe and scored a brace.
