= Zaw Win (footballer) =

Burmese footballer

Personal information
- Date of birth: 30 December 1994 (age 31)
- Place of birth: Daik-U, Myanmar
- Height: 1.63 m (5 ft 4 in)
- Position: Right back

Team information
- Current team: Yangon United
- Number: 16

Youth career
- 2011–2012: Yangon United Youth Team

Senior career*
Years	Team	Apps	(Gls)
2011– 2015	Yangon United		
2015– 2018	Chin United		
2019– 2020	Ayeyawady United		
2021– present	Yangon United		
- * Club domestic league appearances and goals as of 10 Jan 2021 ‡ National team caps and goals as of October 20, 2014

Zaw Win (Burmese: ဇော်ဝင်း; born 30 December 1994) is a footballer from Myanmar and a defender for Yangon United FC. He has represented the Myanmar national team.
