= Ernest Aboubacar Congo =

Burkina Faso footballer

Ernest Aboubacar
Personal information
- Date of birth: 13 December 1992 (age 33)
- Place of birth: Ouagadougou, Burkina Faso
- Height: 1.82 m (6 ft 0 in)
- Position: Right back

Team information
- Current team: Yangon United
- Number: 32

Senior career*
Years	Team	Apps	(Gls)
2008–2011	Étoile Filante de Ouagadougou		
2011–2012	US Ouagadougou		
2012–2014	AS SONABEL		
2014–2017	Ittihad Khemisset	19	(4)
2017	→ AS FAR (loan)	1	(0)
2019–	Yangon United	14	(1)

International career
2016	Burkina Faso	1	(0)
- * Club domestic league appearances and goals

Ernest Aboubacar (born 13 December 1992) is a Burkina Faso footballer. He was part of the pre-squad of the African Cup 2017. He transferred to AS FAR in January 2017 on a loan deal.
