= Donald Bissa =

Ivorian footballer

Personal information
- Full name: Donald Bissa
- Date of birth: 13 December 1991 (age 34)
- Place of birth: Daloa, Ivory Coast
- Height: 1.85 m (6 ft 1 in)
- Position: Striker

Team information
- Current team: Persikotas Nusantara

Senior career*
Years	Team	Apps	(Gls)
2012–2013	PSAP Sigli	6	(5)
2013–2014	Deltras Sidoarjo	8	(3)
2014	PSIR Rembang	7	(5)
2014–2015	PSBL Langsa	7	(7)
2016	Manaw Myay	22	(30)
2017	Zwekapin United	15	(7)
2018	Martapura	0	(0)
2019	Sagaing United	19	(14)
2020	Hanthawaddy United	18	(13)
2021	Barito Putera	0	(0)
2022–2024	PSM Makassar	18	(1)
2024–2026	Dejan	24	(11)
2026–	Persikotas Nusantara	0	(0)
- * Club domestic league appearances and goals as of 27 March 2026

Donald Bissa (born 13 December 1991) is an Ivorian professional footballer who plays as a striker for Liga Nusantara club Persikotas Nusantara.

== Club career ==
=== Deltras Sidoarjo ===
Promised by Deltras Sidoarjo to be paid three months' debt halfway through 2013, he lacked the wherewithal to return to Ivory Coast to celebrate Eid al-Fitr with his family that August as he had still not received the payment.

=== Martapura ===
Included with Martapura at the 2018 Indonesia President's Cup, Bissa picked up an injury despite contributing two goals in a practice game with Porprov Kukar, recovering in time for their final Group B clash with Kalteng Putra.

=== PSM Makassar ===
He was signed for PSM Makassar to play in Liga 1 in the 2022 season. Bissa made his league debut on 2 September 2022 in a match against Persik Kediri at the Brawijaya Stadium, Kediri. On 5 December 2022, Bissa made his first goal for the club in Liga 1, earning them a 2–0 win over Persikabo 1973.

== Personal life ==
Born and raised in Ivory Coast, he acquired Indonesian citizenship in 2022.

== Honours ==
PSM Makassar

- Liga 1: 2022–23

Dejan

- Liga Nusantara runner-up: 2025–26
