= Kaung Htet Soe =

Burmese footballer

Personal information
- Full name: Kaung Htet Zaw
- Date of birth: 1 September 1997 (age 29)
- Place of birth: Amarapura, Mandalay, Myanmar
- Height: 1.73 m (5 ft 8 in)
- Position: Forward

Team information
- Current team: Yangon United
- Number: 24

Youth career
- 2015–2018: Yangon United Youth team

Senior career*
Years	Team	Apps	(Gls)
2019–2020	Yangon United	35	(8)
2022–2023	Kamphaengphet	13	(6)
2023–	Yangon United	17	(1)

International career^{‡}
2019–2020	Myanmar U23	12	(1)
- * Club domestic league appearances and goals as of 1 November 2023 ‡ National team caps and goals as of 17 Jan 2023

Kaung Htet Soe (Burmese: ေကာင္းထက္စိုး; born ၁ စက္တင္ဘာ ၁၉၉၇; 1 September 1997) is a Burmese footballer who plays as an attacker for Kamphaengphet. He was born in Amarapura, Mandalay.He is a shinning star of Yangon United.

== Club career ==
Kaung Htet Soe started play at Yangon United Youth team in 2015. During 2016 and 2017, he showed his impressive talent and trained with Yangon United senior team. In 2018 MNL U-21 season, he became a captain of Yangon United and showed his talent again. Before 2019 MNL season, Yangon United Coach Myo Min Tun took him and signed for Yangon United senior team. His first international goal is against Ceres–Negros. and his first goal of MNL is against Yadanarbon FC
