= Nan Wai Min =

Burmese footballer

Personal information
- Full name: Nan Wai Min
- Date of birth: 1 January 1996 (age 30)
- Place of birth: Myanmar
- Height: 1.66 m (5 ft 5 1/2 in)
- Position: Right-back

Team information
- Current team: Rakhine United

Youth career
- 2013–2016: Yangon United Youth Team

Senior career*
| Years | Team | Apps | (Gls) |
| 2017–2019 | Yangon United | 34 | (0) |
| 2019-2021 | Hanthawady United | 18 | (0) |
| 2023- | Rakhine United | 7 | (0) |

International career^{‡}
| 2015–2016 | Myanmar U20 | 9 | (0) |
- * Club domestic league appearances and goals as of 22 October 2023 ‡ National team caps and goals as of 4 June 2017

Nan Wai Min (Burmese: နန်းဝေမင်း; born 1 January 1996) is a footballer from Burma, and a defender for the Myanmar national under-23 football team.
