= Than Htet Aung =

Burmese footballer

Personal information
- Date of birth: 5 June 1992 (age 34)
- Place of birth: Kyimyindaing Township, Myanmar
- Height: 1.66 m (5 ft 5 1/2 in)
- Position: Forward

Team information
- Current team: Ayeyawady United
- Number: 27

Youth career
- 2009: Yangon United Youth Team

Senior career*
Years	Team	Apps	(Gls)
2010–2017	Yangon United		(3)
2015	→ Zwegabin United (loan)		(2)
2018–2020	Zwegabin United	23	(10)
2019	→ Samut Sakhon (loan)	14	(0)
2020–2021	Ayeyawady United	17	(5)

International career^{‡}
2018–2019	Myanmar	10	(1)
- * Club domestic league appearances and goals as of 23 October 2018 ‡ National team caps and goals as of 15 June 2021

Than Htet Aung (Burmese: သန်းထက်အောင်; born 5 June 1992) is a footballer from Myanmar who plays as a forward for Ayeyawady United.

== Career ==
=== Club ===
Than Htet Aung learned to play football in the youth academy of Yangon United. He signed his first professional contract with the club in 2010. The club competes in the Myanmar National League and is based in Yangon. In 2015, he was loaned to Zwegabin United, a league rival based in Hpa-an, for one year. After his contract with Yangon United ended, he joined Zwekapin United permanently in 2018. After playing 23 matches and scoring 10 goals in one year, he moved to Thailand and signed with Sakon Nakhon F.C., a club competing in the Thai League 2, based in Samut Sakhon. After one season, he returned to Myanmar and joined Ayeyawady United, a top-division club from Pathein.

=== International career ===
Than Htet Aung played six matches for the Myanmar U-19 and four matches for the Myanmar U-23 national teams. Since 2018, he has been a regular member of the Myanmar national team. He made his international debut on October 10, 2018, in a friendly match against Indonesia.

== Achievements ==
Yangon United

- 2011, 2012, 2013 – Myanmar National League

=== International goals ===
Scores and results list Myanmar's goal tally first.

No.	Date	Venue	Opponent	Score	Result	Competition
1.	12 November 2018	Mandalarthiri Stadium, Mandalay, Myanmar	Cambodia	2–1	4–1	2018 AFF Championship
