= Wai Lin Aung (footballer, born 1996) =

Burmese footballer

Personal information
- Full name: Wai Lin Aung
- Date of birth: 20 May 1996 (age 30)
- Height: 1.70 m (5 ft 7 in)
- Position: Goalkeeper

Team information
- Current team: GFA
- Number: 12

Youth career
- 2010–2013: Yangon United Youth Team

Senior career*
| Years | Team | Apps | (Gls) |
| 2014–2020 | Yangon United | 3 | (0) |
| 2017 (loan) | Nay Pyi Taw | 12 | (0) |
| 2022 | GFA | | |
- * Club domestic league appearances and goals as of 1 March 2018 ‡ National team caps and goals as of 4 June 2017

Wai Lin Aung (Burmese: ဝေလင်းအောင်; born 20 May 1996) is a Burmese footballer who currently plays as a goalkeeper for GFA in the Myanmar National League.
