= Sann Satt Naing =

Burmese footballer

Personal information
- Full name: Sann Satt Naing
- Date of birth: 4 November 1997 (age 29)
- Place of birth: Thayetmyo, Myanmar
- Height: 1.88 m (6 ft 2 in)
- Position: Goalkeeper

Team information
- Current team: Yangon United
- Number: 75

Youth career
- 2014–2016: Myanmar Football Academy

Senior career*
| Years | Team | Apps | (Gls) |
| 2017– | Yangon United | 146 | (0) |

International career^{‡}
| 2016–2019 | Myanmar U22 | 21 | (0) |
| 2017– | Myanmar | 14 | (0) |
Medal record
Men's football
Representing Myanmar
Tri-Nation Series
| Silver medal – second place | 2023 India |
Sea Games
| Bronze medal – third place | 2019 philippines |
- * Club domestic league appearances and goals as of 19 July 2026 ‡ National team caps and goals as of 19 July 2026

San Sat Naing (Burmese: ဆန်းဆက်နိုင်; also spelled Sann Satt Naing; born 4 November 1997) is a Burmese footballer playing as a goalkeeper for Burmese club Yangon United. He was signed from the MFF Academy to the Yangon United senior team.

== Club career ==
=== Yangon United ===
In September 2017, Sann played his first match for Yangon United in a 1–0 win over Hantharwady United. He had a clean sheet in his first appearance in Yangon United and replaced the injured Kyaw Zin Htet.

== International career ==
=== Youth ===
Sann was the starting goalkeeper for the country's U-22 team in the 2017 South East Asian Games.

Sann showed good form in 2019 SEA Games tournament where he was name the 'Best Goalkeeper' in the tournament and was also included in the Best XI.

=== Senior ===
Sann make his senior international debut for Myanmar on 10 October 2018 in a friendly match against Indonesia in a 3–0 loss. In November 2024, Sann was in the preliminary squad for the 2024 ASEAN Championship.

== International statistics ==
As of match played 18 July 2026

Appearances and goals by national team and year
| National team | Year | Apps | Goals |
|---|---|---|---|
| Myanmar | 2017 | 1 | 0 |
| Myanmar | 2018 | 1 | 0 |
| Myanmar | 2019 | 0 | 0 |
| Myanmar | 2020 | 0 | 0 |
| Myanmar | 2021 | 3 | 0 |
| Myanmar | 2022 | 0 | 0 |
| Myanmar | 2023 | 5 | 0 |
| Myanmar | 2024 | 1 | 0 |
| Myanmar | 2025 | 1 | 0 |
| Myanmar | 2026 | 2 | 0 |
| Total | | 14 | 0 |

== Honours ==
Yangon United

- Myanmar National League: 2018

National Team

- Tri-Nation Series (India)

- Runners-up (1):2023

- SEA Games bronze medal: 2019

Individual

- Myanmar National League Best Goalkeeper: 2022, 2023
