= Pyae Phyo Zaw =

Burmese footballer

Personal information
- Full name: Pyae Phyo Zaw
- Date of birth: 2 June 1994 (age 32)
- Place of birth: Taungoo, Myanmar
- Height: 1.75 m (5 ft 9 in)
- Position: Defender

Team information
- Current team: Ayeyawady United
- Number: 4

Youth career
- 2014–2016: Yangon United Youth Club

Senior career*
Years	Team	Apps	(Gls)
2017–	Yangon United	20	(3)
2017	→ University (loan)		
2024-	Ayeyawady United		

International career^{‡}
2018–	Myanmar	2	(0)
- * Club domestic league appearances and goals as of 11 May 2025 ‡ National team caps and goals as of 16 November 2018

Pyae Phyo Zaw (Burmese: ပြည့်ဖြိူးဇော်; born 2 June 1994 in Myanmar) is a footballer from Burma, and a defender of Yangon United. He promoted from Yangon Youth Team to Yangon United Senior Team. Pyae Phyo Zaw was born in Taungoo, Bago Division.

== Club career ==
=== Yangon United ===
First ever match of Pyae Phyo Zaw in Yangon United was against Hantharwady United. He was chosen when Zaw Min Tun was injured.
