= Kyi Lin =

Burmese footballer

Personal information
- Full name: Kyi Lin
- Date of birth: 4 September 1992 (age 34)
- Place of birth: Yangon, Myanmar
- Height: 1.67 m (5 ft 5 1/2 in)
- Position: Midfielder

Team information
- Current team: Rakhine United
- Number: 8

Senior career*
Years	Team	Apps	(Gls)
2009–2019	Yangon United	174	(15)
2019	Zwegapin United	11	(4)
2019–2020	Yangon United	16	(6)
2024–	Rakhine United		

International career
2011–2013	Myanmar U23	11	(3)
2011–	Myanmar	42	(7)
- * Club domestic league appearances and goals

Kyi Lin (Burmese: ကြည်လင်း; born 4 September 1989) is a Burmese professional footballer who plays as midfielder for Rakhine United and the Myanmar national football team.

== International goals ==
Scores and results list Myanmar's goal tally first.

Date	Venue	Opponent	Score	Result	Competition
7 October 2012	Thuwunna Stadium, Yangon	Timor-Leste	1–0	2–1	2012 AFF Championship qualification
7 October 2012	Thuwunna Stadium, Yangon	Timor-Leste	2–1	2–1	2012 AFF Championship qualification
11 October 2012	Thuwunna Stadium, Yangon	Cambodia	1–0	3–0	2012 AFF Championship qualification
24 November 2012	Rajamangala Stadium, Bangkok	Vietnam	1–1	1–1	2012 AFF Championship
2 March 2013	Thuwunna Stadium, Yangon	Guam	2–0	5–0	2014 AFC Challenge Cup qualification
16 October 2014	New Laos National Stadium, Vientiane	Brunei	3–1	3–1	2014 AFF Championship qualification
27 March 2018	Thuwunna Stadium, Yangon	Macau	1–0	1–0	2019 AFC Asian Cup qualification

== Honours ==
=== Club ===
Yangon United

- Myanmar National League: 2011, 2012, 2013
- MFF Cup: 2011

=== Individual ===
- MFF Player of the Year: 2012
- ASEAN Football Federation best XI: 2013
