= Southern Myanmar F.C. =

Southern Myanmar
- Full name: Southern Myanmar Football Club
- Nickname(s): Southerners
- Founded: 2009; 16 years ago
- Ground: Yamanya Stadium
- Capacity: 20,000
- Owner: Htay Myint
- Chairman: Hla Maung Shwe
- Manager: Kyaw Min
- League: Myanmar National League
- 2020: MNL, 10th
Home colours	Away colours

Southern Myanmar Football Club was a Burmese football club, based in Mawlamyine. The club was a founding member of the Myanmar National League (MNL) in 2009. The club represented the Mon State, Kayin State and Tanintharyi Region in southern coast of Myanmar.

== Final players ==
As of January 2020

Note: Flags indicate national team as defined under FIFA eligibility rules; some limited exceptions apply. Players may hold more than one non-FIFA nationality.

No.	Pos.	Nation	Player
1	GK	(Myanmar) MYA	Pyae Phyo Aung (Captain)
2	DF	(Myanmar) MYA	Wai Phyo Lwin
3	DF	(Myanmar) MYA	Naing Lin Tun
4	DF	(Myanmar) MYA	Aung Hein Soe Oo
5	DF	(Myanmar) MYA	Phyo Paing Soe
6	DF	(Myanmar) MYA	Than Zaw Myo
7	MF	(Myanmar) MYA	Shine Thura (Vice Captain)
8	MF	(Myanmar) MYA	Swan Htet Aung
9	MF	(Myanmar) MYA	Yan Kyaw Htwe
10	FW	(Myanmar) MYA	Kaung Sithu
11	FW	(Myanmar) MYA	Chan Nyein

No.	Pos.	Nation	Player
12	DF	(Myanmar) MYA	Zin Myo Naing
14	DF	(Myanmar) MYA	Paing Soe Wai
15	DF	(Myanmar) MYA	Htet Aung
16	MF	(Myanmar) MYA	Tun Min Soe
17	MF	(Myanmar) MYA	Thura Min Naing
18	MF	(Myanmar) MYA	Phyo Nyi Nyi Lwin
19	MF	(Myanmar) MYA	Zin Min
20	MF	(Myanmar) MYA	Phyo Thet Oo
21	FW	(Myanmar) MYA	Aung Myat Thu
22	GK	(Myanmar) MYA	Aung Ko Ko Naing
23	DF	(Myanmar) MYA	Zaw Lin Oo
33	GK	(Myanmar) MYA	Pyae Phyo Kyaw
