= Zaw Min Tun (footballer) =

Burmese footballer

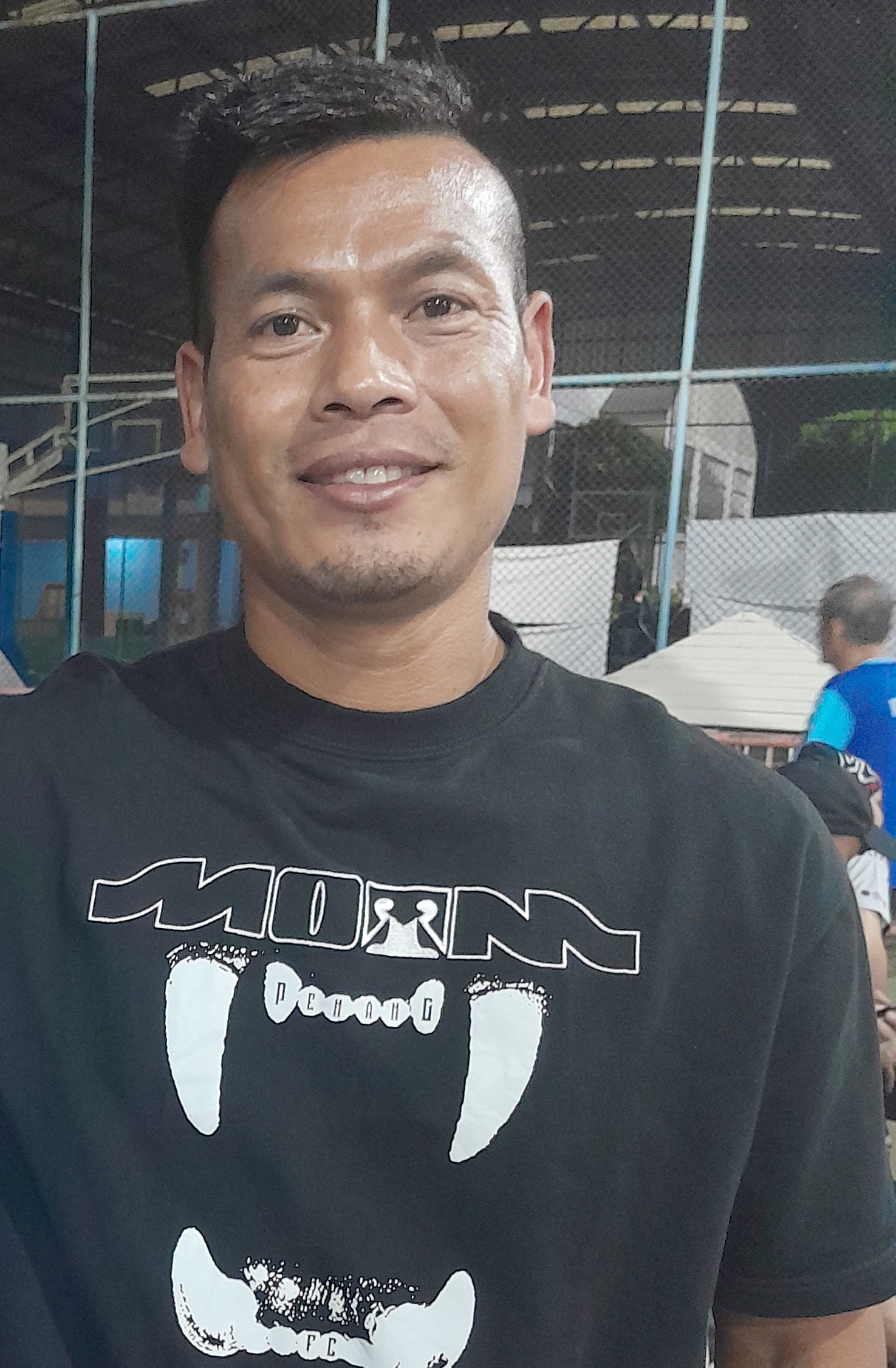

Personal information
- Date of birth: 20 May 1992 (age 34)
- Place of birth: Mandalay, Myanmar
- Height: 1.83 m (6 ft 0 in)
- Position: Centre back

Team information
- Current team: Futera United

Senior career*
| Years | Team | Apps | (Gls) |
| 2009–2012 | Magway | 71 | (0) |
| 2012–2014 | Yadanarbon | 73 | (1) |
| 2015–2017 | Yangon United | 116 | (7) |
| 2018 | GFA FC | 1 | (0) |
| 2018 | Yangon United | 17 | (0) |
| 2019 | Chonburi | 24 | (1) |
| 2020–2021 | Sukhothai | 12 | (0) |
| 2021–2022 | Trat | 23 | (0) |
| 2022 | Chonburi | 10 | (0) |
| 2023 | Penang | 26 | (0) |
| 2024 | Nakhon Pathom United | 2 | (0) |
| 2024 | Trat | 11 | (0) |
| 2025 | Bangkok | 10 | (2) |
| 2026 | Phrae United | 2 | (0) |
| 2026– | Futera United | 0 | (0) |

International career^{‡}
| 2012 | Myanmar U22 | 5 | (1) |
| 2011–2018 | Myanmar U23 (WC) | 21 | (2) |
| 2011–2019 | Myanmar | 75 | (5) |
- * Club domestic league appearances and goals as of 1 July 2024 ‡ National team caps and goals as of 19 November 2019

Zaw Min Tun (Burmese: ဇော်မင်းထွန်း; born 20 May 1992) is a Burmese professional footballer who plays as a centre back for Thai League 3 club Futera United and the captain of the Myanmar national team. He was the bronze medalist with Myanmar in 2011 SEA Games.

== Career ==
On 14 December 2012, Tun left Magway to sign a 3-years deal with Yadanarbon for the Burmese record 120 million Kyats ($140,350). He got first runner-up of the MNL 2013 Best Player Award.

== Style of play ==
Zaw Min Tun is a physically strong player who excels in the air due to his elevation and heading accuracy, making him a goal threat on set-pieces.

Due to his leadership, athleticism and technical prowess, his ability to excel both offensively and defensively, as well as his tactical versatility, which allows him to be deployed as a centre back and as a right back.

== International ==
As of match played 19 November 2019

Appearances and goals by national team and year
| National team | Year | Apps | Goals |
|---|---|---|---|
| Myanmar | 2011 | 9 | 0 |
| Myanmar | 2012 | 8 | 0 |
| Myanmar | 2013 | 5 | 0 |
| Myanmar | 2014 | 9 | 0 |
| Myanmar | 2015 | 7 | 1 |
| Myanmar | 2016 | 11 | 2 |
| Myanmar | 2017 | 7 | 1 |
| Myanmar | 2018 | 7 | 0 |
| Myanmar | 2019 | 12 | 1 |
| Total | | 75 | 5 |

Goals by opponent
| Opponent | Goals |
|---|---|
| Cambodia | 3 |
| China | 1 |
| Laos | 1 |
| Total | 5 |

== International goals ==
Scores and results list Myanmar's goal tally first.

| # | Date | Venue | Opponent | Score | Result | Competition |
|---|---|---|---|---|---|---|
| 1. | 13 October 2015 | New Laos National Stadium, Vientiane | Laos | 1–0 | 2–2 | 2018 FIFA World Cup qualification |
| 2. | 23 November 2016 | Thuwunna Stadium, Yangon | Cambodia | 1–1 | 3–1 | 2016 AFF Championship |
| 3. | 23 November 2016 | Thuwunna Stadium, Yangon | Cambodia | 2–1 | 3–1 | 2016 AFF Championship |
| 4. | 9 November 2017 | Phnom Penh Olympic Stadium, Phnom Penh | Cambodia | 1–0 | 2–1 | Friendly |
| 5. | 30 August 2019 | National Football Training Centre, Xianghe, Hebei | China | 1–4 | 1–4 | Friendly |

== Honours ==
=== National team ===
- Philippine Peace Cup (1): 2014

=== Club ===
Yadanarbon

- Myanmar National League (1): 2014

Yangon United

- Myanmar National League (2): 2015, 2018
