= Myo Min Tun =

Burmese footballer

Personal information
- Full name: Myo Min Tun
- Date of birth: 14 July 1983 (age 43)
- Place of birth: Bago, Myanmar
- Position: Midfielder

Team information
- Current team: Hanthawaddy United (manager)

Senior career*
Years	Team	Apps	(Gls)
2003–2008	Ministry of Commerce	84	(12)
2009–2012	Yangon United F.C.	82	(?)
Total		166	(12)

International career
2004–2011	Myanmar	38	(5)

Managerial career
- 2013–2016: Yangon United F.C. (assistant)
- 2017–2019: Yangon United F.C. (head coach)
- 2019–: Hanthawaddy United (head coach)
- * Club domestic league appearances and goals

Myo Min Tun (born 14 June 1983) is a Burmese former footballer. He made his first appearance for the Myanmar national football team in 2004. Myo Min Tun retired in 2013 MNL season. In June 2016, he became a Yangon United manager.

== Career statistics ==
=== International ===
Appearances and goals by national team and year
National team	Year	Apps	Goals
Myanmar	2004	6	0
Myanmar	2005	2	0
Myanmar	2006	–	
Myanmar	2007	2	0
Myanmar	2008	15	3
Myanmar	2009	3	1
Myanmar	2010	6	1
Myanmar	2011	4	0
Total		38	5

Scores and results list Myanmar's goal tally first, score column indicates score after each Myo goal.

List of international goals scored by Myo Min Tun
No.	Date	Venue	Opponent	Score	Result	Competition
1	31 July 2008	G. M. C. Balayogi Athletic Stadium, Hyderabad, India	Nepal	2–0	3–0	2008 AFC Challenge Cup
2	7 December 2008	Gelora Bung Karno Stadium, Jakarta, Indonesia	Singapore	1–2	1–3	2008 AFF Championship
3	9 December 2008	Gelora Bung Karno Stadium, Jakarta, Indonesia	Cambodia	3–2	3–2	2008 AFF Championship
4	26 April 2009	National Stadium, Dhaka, Bangladesh	Macau	4–0	4–0	2010 AFC Challenge Cup qualification
5	16 February 2010	Sugathadasa Stadium, Colombo, Sri Lanka	Sri Lanka	4–0	4–0	2010 AFC Challenge Cup
