= Thein Zaw =

Burmese footballer

Personal information
- Full name: Thein Zaw
- Date of birth: 28 May 1993 (age 33)
- Place of birth: Yangon, Myanmar
- Height: 1.81 m (5 ft 11 in)
- Position: Defender

Team information
- Current team: Magwe
- Number: 6

Senior career*
Years	Team	Apps	(Gls)
2013–2014	Ayeyawady United		
2014–2015	Zwekapin United	20	(3)
2015–2019	Yangon United	5	(0)
2020-	Magwe	7	(2)

International career^{‡}
2014–	Myanmar	3	(0)
- * Club domestic league appearances and goals as of 22 Feb 2020 ‡ National team caps and goals as of 5 December 2015

Thein Zaw (Burmese: သိန်းဇော်; born 5 May 1994) is a footballer from Burma, and a defender for Myanmar national football team.

== Club career ==
He currently plays for Zwekapin United in Myanmar National League, and formally played for Ayeyawady United. In 2015 December, Thein Zaw moved to Yangon United.

== International career ==
Thein Zaw made his debut on 19 May 2014 in the AFC Challenge Cup against the host Maldives. In the match Thein Zaw was controversially sent off in the 22 minute by referee Abdullah Balideh for alleged handball, a charge fervently denied by Myanmar's coach Radojko Avramović, as the ball seemed to bounce off his chest rather than his arm.
