= Hantharwady United F.C. =

Hantharwady United ဟံသာဝတီ ယူနိုက်တက် ဘောလုံး အသင်း
- Full name: Hantharwady United Football Club
- Nicknames: The Shelducks (ဟင်္သာ)
- Founded: 2009; 17 years ago as Okktha United; 2012; 14 years ago as Hantharwady United
- Ground: Grand Royal Stadium
- Capacity: 7,000
- Owner: Aung Moe Kyaw
- Head coach: Myo Min Tun
- League: Myanmar National League
- 2025–26: MNL, 5th of 12
Home colours	Away colours

Hantharwady United Football Club (Burmese: ဟံသာဝတီ ယူနိုက်တက် ဘောလုံး အသင်း) is a professional football club based in Bago, Myanmar and represents the Bago Region. The club was a founding member of the Myanmar National League (MNL) in 2009. It finished in sixth place in the league's inaugural cup competition, the MNL Cup 2009. In 2012, the club changed its name from Okktha United to Hantharwady United. As Okktha United, the club won their first major trophy by winning the MFF Cup in 2010.

== History ==
=== 2019–2011 ===
Hantharwady United was a founding member of the Myanmar National League in 2009 as Okktha United. This team represents the Bago Region. The team owner is Aung Moe Kyaw of International Beverages Trading (IBT).

=== 2012–14 ===
In 2012, the club was renamed to Hantharwady United where they got relegated to MNL-2. Hantharwady became champions of MNL-2 in the 2014 season and were promoted to the MNL. Bamba scored 24 goals while Hantharwady United were in MNL-2. In the 2018 season, Joseph Mpande won the league 'Golden boot' becoming the league top scorer with 18 goals.

=== 2019–2021 ===

2020 Myanmar National League starting lineup Hantharwady United 2–2 Ayeyawady United

At the end of the 2019 season, Hantharwady United appointed Myo Min Tun (former Yangon United coach) as their head coach. The team kicked off the 2020 Myanmar National League with a 1–0 win over Rakhine United at Bago, claiming an instant fourth spot. Since a win against Chin United in Week 3, Hantharwady United maintained its 1st position in the league for 15 consecutive weeks, until Week 18. During this time, Hantharwady United won 13 games, drew 1 and lost 2, while scoring 42 goals and conceding only 12. In the following week, Hantharwady United surprisingly lost to Magwe, which meant that the team shifted to 2nd place while Shan United took over after a long run of consecutive wins. Hantharwady United drew to Ayeyawady United in their last match of 2020 Myanmar National League, finishing as the runner-up behind the champions Shan United just by a point. The 18 year old winger Hein Htet Aung laid on the most assists (9 assists) while Ko Ko Naing kept the most cleansheets (9 cleansheets) in the league. In addition, the Ivorian forward Donald Bissa and Hein Htet Aung won 'Player Of The Month' award once each with coach Myo Min Tun also winning the 'Manager Of The Month' award twice.

Due to the COVID-19 pandemic, General Aung San Shield was postponed, meaning Hantharwady United were guaranteed a spot in the play-off round of 2021 AFC Cup, which will be their first appearance in a continental competition.

To prepare for the upcoming 2021 Myanmar National League and 2021 AFC Cup, Hantharwady United have signed the veteran goalkeeper Pyae Phyo Aung from Southern Myanmar and Ye Yint Aung from Yadanarbon More signings will be made upon coach Myo Min Tun's decision over the transfer window.

== Manufacturers and sponsors ==
Period	Kit manufacturer	Sponsors	
Period	Kit manufacturer	Shirt (major)	Shirt (minor)
2009–2019	(Thailand) FBT	(Myanmar) Grand Royal	
2020–present	(Myanmar) SCM	(Myanmar) Grand Royal	(Hong Kong) AIA

== Players ==
As of February 2026

Note: Flags indicate national team as defined under FIFA eligibility rules; some limited exceptions apply. Players may hold more than one non-FIFA nationality.

No.	Pos.	Nation	Player
1	GK	MYA	Nay Lin Htet
2	DF	MYA	Soe Lin
3	DF	MYA	Win Ko Ko Tun
4	DF	MYA	Hein Zayar Oo
5	DF	MYA	Aung Myo Thet
6	DF	MYA	Aung Myo Htwe (2)
8	MF	MYA	Maung Maung Soe
10	FW	MYA	Than Toe Aung
11	FW	MYA	Kaung Khant Kyaw
12	MF	MYA	Thuya Aung
13	DF	MYA	Kyaw Htoo
14	MF	MYA	Yan Naing Aung (Captain)
15	DF	MYA	Pyae Phyo Zaw
16	DF	MYA	Kaung Htet Aung
18	MF	MYA	Shwe Ko

No.	Pos.	Nation	Player
23	DF	MYA	Zaw Lin Oo
24	DF	MYA	Win Moe Kyaw
25	DF	MYA	Min Htoo Eain Lin
27	MF	MYA	Thu Ya Zaw
28	DF	MYA	Hlaing Myo Aung
32	MF	MYA	Zwe Htet Aung
34	FW	MYA	Soe Kyaw Kyaw
40	GK	MYA	Chit Moe Set
41	DF	MYA	Shin Thant Aung
42	MF	MYA	Han Win Aung
55	DF	MYA	Aung Moe Htwe (1)
70	FW	MYA	Kyi Soe
71	MF	MYA	Bo Bo Aung

== Coaching staff ==
As of 2 January 2021

Position	Name	Nationality
Team manager	Tun Tun Lin	MYA
Head coach	Myo Min Tun	MYA
Assistant coach	Chit Ko Ko	MYA
Assistant coach	Tin Win	MYA
Goalkeeping coach	Aung Thet	MYA
Physical Therapist	Aung Latt Thu	MYA

=== Managerial history ===
Head coaches by years (2018–present)

Name	Period	Honours
(Singapore) PN Sivaji	2010–2012	
(Myanmar) Ngwe Tun	2018–2019	
(Myanmar) Myo Min Tun	2020–present	

== Season-by-season record ==
Season	League									MFF Cup	Top goalscorer		Manager
Season	Div.	Pos.	Pl.	W	D	L	GS	GA	P	MFF Cup	Name	Goals	Manager
09–10	1st	6st	14	3	6	5	11	20	15				
2010	1st	6th	20	9	3	8	34	34	30				
2011	1st	5th	22	9	6	7	27	26	33				
2012	1st	9th	22	9	7	10	28	30	34				(Myanmar) Win Tun
2013	1st	11th	22	2	8	12	21	39	14				(Myanmar) Ngwe Tun
2014	2nd	1st	17	14	8	0	48	1	45		(Nigeria) Bamba	6	
2015	1st	7th	22	5	9	8	25	26	24				(Myanmar) Ngwe Tun
2016	1st	5th	22	8	6	8	31	32	30		(Nigeria) Bamba Gaoussou	10	(Myanmar) Ngwe Tun
2017	1st	9th	22	5	8	9	30	37	23		(Brazil) Marcio Gomes	15	(Myanmar) Zaw Min Htut
2018	1st	4th	22	11	3	8	36	23	36	Semi-final	(Uganda) Joseph Mpande	18	(Myanmar) Win Min Zaw
2019	1st	5th	22	9	5	8	28	27	32	final	(Ghana) Mark Sekyi	6	(Myanmar) Ngwe Tun
2020	1st	2nd	20	15	2	3	49	19	47		(Ivory Coast) Donald Bissa & (Nigeria) Francis Emeka	13	(Myanmar) Myo Min Tun
2022	1st	3rd	18	10	2	6	34	15	32		(Myanmar) Soe Kyaw Kyaw	6	(Myanmar) Myo Min Tun
2023	1st	3rd	22	12	1	9	35	25	37		(Myanmar) Aung Myat Thu	12	(Myanmar) Myo Min Tun

== Honours ==
Hantharwady United – Honours
Type	Competition	Titles	Title Seasons	Runners-up	Runners-up seasons	Third Place	Third Place Seasons
League	Myanmar National League	0	–	1	2020	3	2022, 2023, 2024–25
League (2nd Tier)	MNL-2	1	2014	–	–	–	–
Cup	MFF Cup	1	2010	–	–	–	–
Cup	General Aung San Shield	0	–	1	2019	–	–
