= Than Paing =

Burmese footballer (born 1996)

Personal information
- Date of birth: 6 December 1996 (age 29)
- Place of birth: Hsipaw, Myanmar
- Height: 1.81 m (5 ft 11 in)
- Position: Forward

Team information
- Current team: Yangon United
- Number: 9

Youth career
- 2013 – 2014: Yangon United Youth

Senior career*
Years	Team	Apps	(Gls)
2015–2020	Yangon United	29	(24)
2017	→ Chin United (loan)	5	(4)
2021–2022	Shan United	0	(0)
2022–2023	Kanchanaburi City	19	(12)
2023–2024	Chiangmai United	16	(3)
2024–2025	Kanchanaburi Power	26	(4)
2025–2026	Trat	25	(8)
2026–	Yangon United	2	

International career^{‡}
2013–2015	Myanmar U20	16	(7)
2014–	Myanmar	63	(10)
- * Club domestic league appearances and goals as of 28 July 2026 ‡ National team caps and goals as of 24 September 2026

Than Paing (Burmese: သန်းပိုင်; born 6 December 1996) is a Burmese professional footballer who plays as a forward for Trat in Thai League 2 and the Myanmar national team. He scored the only goal in the 2014 AFC U-19 Championship quarter-final that sent Myanmar to the 2015 FIFA U-20 World Cup for the first time in their history.

== Career ==
=== Yangon United ===
Than Paing scored first ever goal for Yangon United Senior team 2015 MNL second leg against Zwekapin United draw 2–2.

=== Chin United ===
In 2017, Than Paing moved to Chin United on loan for 6 months.

== Career statistics ==
=== Internationals goals and apps ===
– Internationals goals and apps
Team	Internationals	Goals	apps
Yangon United	AFC Champions League	0	1
Yangon United	AFC Champions League 2	4	10

– Internationals goals and apps
National Team	Internationals	Goals	apps
Myanmar U20	FIFA U20 World Cup	0	3

=== Club ===
Appearances and goals by club team and year
Club team	Year	Apps	Goals	Assists
Kanchanaburi City	2022–23	19	12	7
Total		19	12	7

=== International ===
As of match played 24 September 2026

Appearances and goals by national team and year
National team	Year	Apps	Goals	Assists
Myanmar	2014	2	0	0
Myanmar	2015	4	0	0
Myanmar	2016	11	1	0
Myanmar	2017	4	0	0
Myanmar	2018	0	0	0
Myanmar	2019	7	0	0
Myanmar	2020	0	0	0
Myanmar	2021	6	1	1
Myanmar	2022	5	0	0
Myanmar	2023	9	0	1
Myanmar	2024	2	0	1
Myanmar	2025	5	2	0
Myanmar	2026	8	6	0
Total		63	10	3

Scores and results list Myanmar's goal tally first.

No	Date	Venue	Opponent	Score	Result	Competition
1.	6 June 2016	Thuwunna Stadium, Yangon, Myanmar	Hong Kong	1–0	3–0	2016 AYA Bank Cup
2.	8 December 2021	National Stadium, Kallang, Singapore	Timor-Leste	1–0	2–0	2020 AFF Championship
3.	25 March 2025	Thuwunna Stadium, Yangon, Myanmar	Afghanistan	1–1	2–1	2027 AFC Asian Cup qualification
4.	10 June 2025	Thuwunna Stadium, Yangon, Myanmar	Pakistan	1–0	1–0	2027 AFC Asian Cup qualification
5.	26 March 2026	Thuwunna Stadium, Yangon, Myanmar	Afghanistan	1–0	1–1	2027 AFC Asian Cup qualification
6.	31 March 2026	Jinnah Sports Stadium, Islamabad, Pakistan	Pakistan	2–0	2–1	2027 AFC Asian Cup qualification
7.	28 July 2026	New Clark City Athletics Stadium, Capas, Philippines	Philippines	2–0	4–1	2026 ASEAN Championship
8.	28 July 2026	New Clark City Athletics Stadium, Capas, Philippines	Philippines	4–1	4–1	2026 ASEAN Championship
9.	4 August 2026	Thuwunna Stadium, Yangon, Myanmar	Laos	5–2	7–2	2026 ASEAN Championship
10.	24 September 2026	Mong Kok Stadium, Kowloon, Hong Kong	Timor-Leste	2–0	2–0	2026 FIFA ASEAN Cup

== Honours ==
Myanmar

- Tri-Nation Series runner-up: 2023
- Hassanal Bolkiah Trophy: 2014
