= Soe Min Naing =

Burmese footballer

Personal information
- Full name: Soe Min Naing
- Date of birth: 1 July 1990 (age 36)
- Place of birth: Myanmar
- Height: 1.70 m (5 ft 7 in)
- Position: Forward

Team information
- Current team: Yangon United (manager)

Senior career*
Years	Team	Apps	(Gls)
2009–2016	Magway	25	(13)
2016–2020	Yangon United	21	(7)
2022-	Mahar United	27	(5)

International career^{‡}
2015–	Myanmar	2	(0)
- * Club domestic league appearances and goals as of 22 October 2023 ‡ National team caps and goals as of 10 July 2016

Soe Min Naing (Burmese: စိုးမင်းနိုင်; born 1 July 1990) is a footballer from Burma. He plays for Yangon United F.C. and Myanmar national football team. Soe made his national team debut on 30 March 2015 against Indonesia.
