= Yangon United Sports Complex =

Sports complex in Yangon, Myanmar

Coordinates: 16°50′48.6″N 96°07′36.2″E

- Yangon United Sports Complex
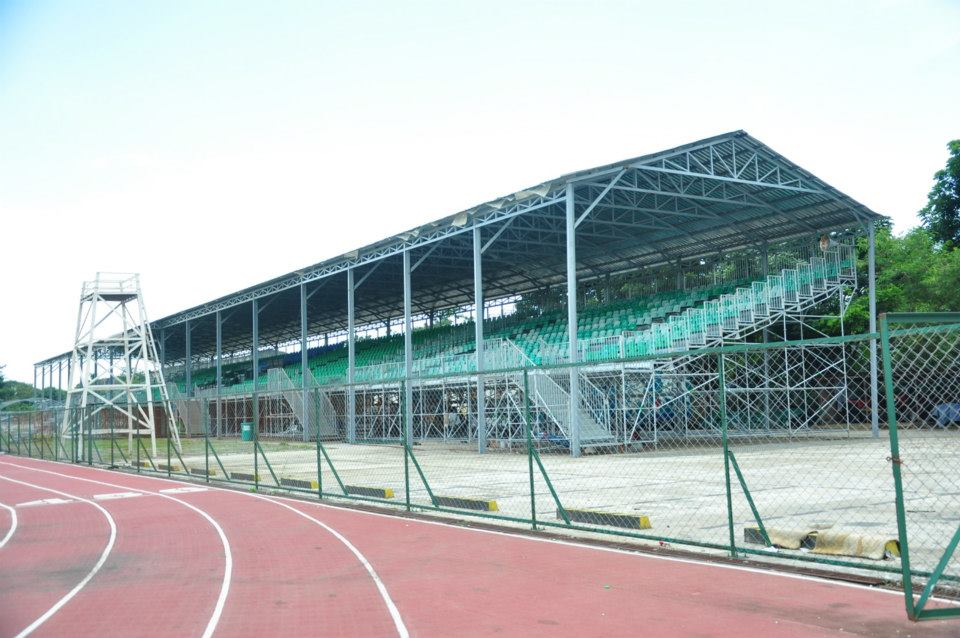
- Interactive map of Yangon United Sports Complex
- Full name: Yangon United Sports Complex
- Location: Hlaing, Yangon
- Owner: Yangon United
- Capacity: 3,500

Tenant
- Yangon United

Yangon United Sports Complex is a multi-use stadium in Yangon, Burma. It is currently used mostly for football matches and is the home ground of Yangon United of the Myanmar National League. The stadium has a capacity of 3,500 spectators.
