= Nyein Chan Aung =

Burmese footballer

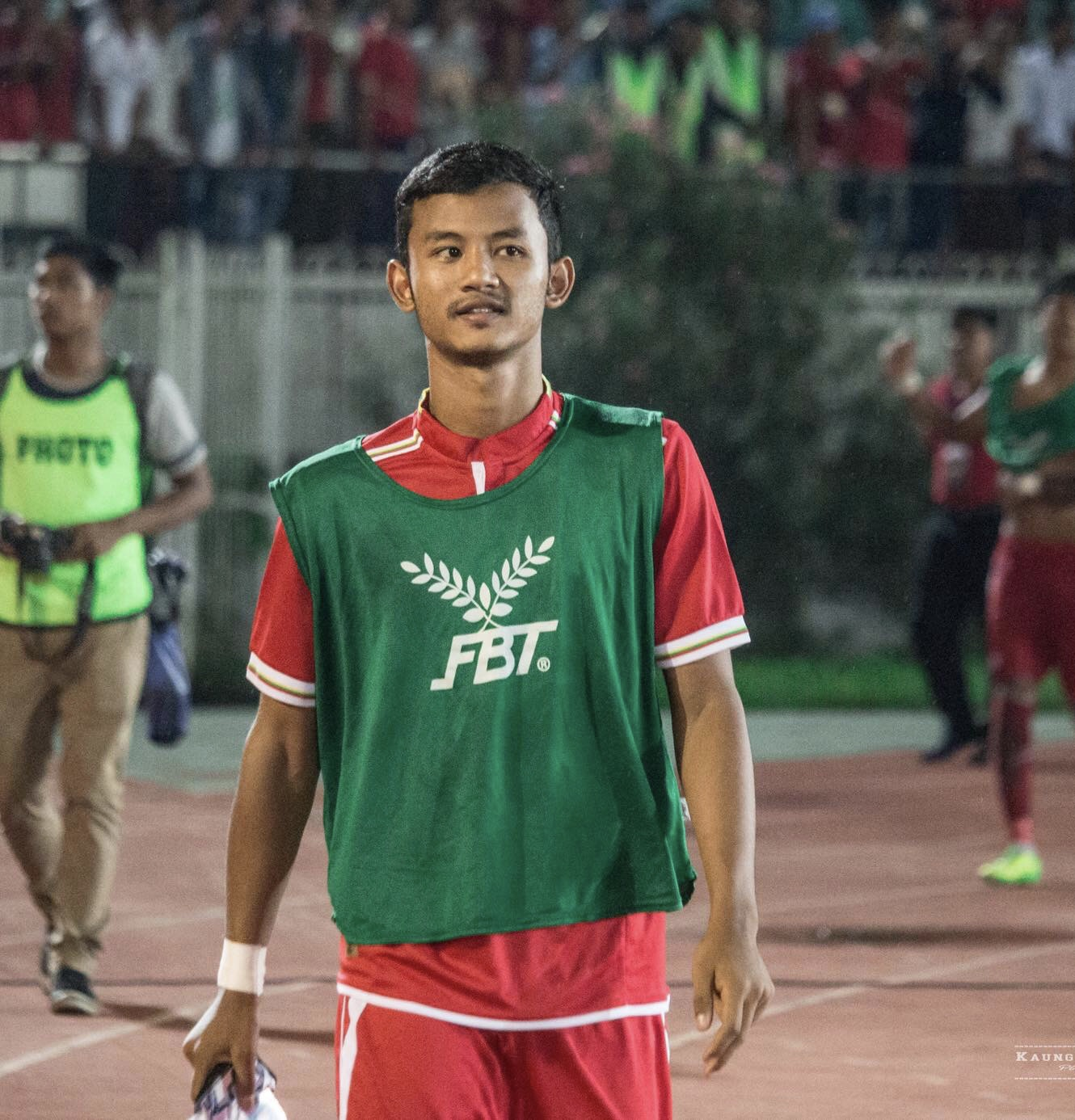
- Nyein Chan Aung in 2019

Personal information
- Date of birth: 18 August 1996 (age 30)
- Place of birth: Myitkyina, Myanmar
- Height: 1.72 m (5 ft 7 1/2 in)
- Positions: Attacking midfielder; winger

Team information
- Current team: Shan United

Youth career
- 2011–2012: Mandalay Football Academy

Senior career*
Years	Team	Apps	(Gls)
2011–2014	Manawmye	81	(?)
2015–2019	Yangon United	77	(?)
2022–2023	Nakhon Si United	11	(0)
2023	Muang Trang United	19	(0)
2025	Dagon Star United	0	(0)
2026-	Shan United	0	(0)

International career^{‡}
2011	Myanmar U-16	6	(0)
2013–2015	Myanmar U-19	14	(8)
2014–2019	Myanmar U-22	3	(0)
2014–	Myanmar	11	(1)
- * Club domestic league appearances and goals as of 5 November 2023 ‡ National team caps and goals as of 20 June 2023

Nyein Chan Aung (Burmese: ငြိမ်းချမ်းအောင်; born 18 August 1996) is a Burmese professional footballer who plays as an attacking midfielder or a winger for the Myanmar national team. He was called up to national senior team in 2014 and scored a goal on his debut against Maldives national football team in 2014 AFC Challenge Cup.

== Early life ==
Nyein Chan Aung was born on 18 August 1996 in Myitkyina, Kachin State, Myanmar. He was selected to represent Myanmar in 2015 U-20 World Cup, but he got a knee problem and missed the World Cup.

== Club career ==
=== 2022 ===
In 2022, He transferred to Nakhon Si United from Yangon United.

=== Club ===
Appearances and goals by club team and year
Club team	Year	Apps	Goals	Assists
Maung Trang United	2022–2023	12	0	3
Maung Trang United	2023–2024	7	0	0
Total		19	0	3

== International career ==
He first appeared in the Myanmar under-16 team that took part at the 2011 AFF U-16 Youth Championship. He scored 3 goals at the 2014 AFC U-19 Championship, which was hosted by Myanmar and became one of the key players who led Myanmar to their first ever FIFA U-20 World Cup.

=== International goals ===
Scores and results list Myanmar's goal tally first.

No	Date	Venue	Opponent	Score	Result	Competition
1.	19 May 2014	National Football Stadium, Malé, Maldives	Maldives	2–0	3–2	2014 AFC Challenge Cup

== International ==
As of match played 30 December 2022

Appearances and goals by national team and year
National team	Year	Apps	Goals
Myanmar	2014	4	1
Myanmar	2019	2	0
Myanmar	2021	2	0
Myanmar	2023	3	0
Total		11	1

== Honours ==
National Team

- Tri-Nation Series (India)

- Runners-up (1):2023

- Hassanal Bolkiah Trophy: 2014
