= Kyaw Zin Htet =

Burmese footballer

Personal information
- Full name: Kyaw Zin Htet
- Date of birth: 2 March 1990 (age 36)
- Place of birth: Pyay, Myanmar
- Height: 1.75 m (5 ft 9 in)
- Position: Goalkeeper

International career
| Years | Team | Apps | (Gls) |
| 2007–2019 | Myanmar | 38 | |

Kyaw Zin Htet (Burmese: ကျော်ဇင်ထက်; born 2 March 1990) is a former Burmese former professional footballer, a Southeast Asian Games Silver medalist, who played as a goalkeeper for the Myanmar national football team.

== International career ==
Zin Htet played for Myanmar at the 2007 SEA Games, where they reached the finals. He was the youngest goalkeeper to play at the SEA Games.

== Personal life ==
Kyaw Zin Htet has retired from professional football life.

== International ==
As of match played 6 June 2019

Appearances and goals by national team and year
| National team | Year | Apps | Goals |
|---|---|---|---|
| Myanmar | 2007 | 4 | 0 |
| Myanmar | 2008 | 3 | 0 |
| Myanmar | 2009 | 3 | 0 |
| Myanmar | 2010 | 1 | 0 |
| Myanmar | 2011 | 8 | 0 |
| Myanmar | 2017 | 3 | 0 |
| Myanmar | 2018 | 9 | 0 |
| Myanmar | 2019 | 7 | 0 |
| Total | | 38 | 0 |

== Honour ==
- SEA Games:
  - Southeast Asian Games Silver medalist (2007)
  - Southeast Asian Games Bronze medalist (2011)
  - ASEAN U14 Silver medalist (2003)
  - Player of the year Myanmar (2007,2018)
