= 2025 MNL League Cup final =

- Event: 2025 MNL League Cup
Yangon United	Shan United
1	0
- Date: 6 July 2025
- Venue: Thuwunna Stadium, Yangon
- Man of the Match: Hein Zeyar Lin
- Referee: U Zaw Zaw
- Attendance: 9,000
- Weather: Cloudy; 29 °C (84 °F) humidity 93%

The 2025 MNL League Cup Final was the final match of the 2025 MNL League Cup, Myanmar's top-tier premier knockout football competition organized by the Myanmar National League (MNL). The final was played on 6 July 2025 at the Thuwunna Youth Training Centre Stadium in Yangon, Myanmar, between Shan United, and Yangon United.

The final featured Shan United from Taunggyi representing the Shan State region, and Yangon United.

In the semi-finals held on 23–24 June, Shan United secured their place in the final with a win over Ayeyawady United. Yangon United advanced to the final after a victory over Yadanarbon. The clubs had also previously faced each other in recent editions of the competition. The winner qualified for the 2025–26 AFC Challenge League qualifiers.

== Route to the final ==
=== Shan United ===
Shan United's route to the final
Round	Opposition	Score
Group	Young Boys	16–0
Group	University	1–0
Group	Dagon Port	7–1
Group	Thitsar Arman	1–1
QF	Myawady	2–0
SF	Ayeyawady United	2–0

Shan United finished the group stage unbeaten across six matches, which included a 16–0 win over Young Boys FC. In the quarter-finals, they defeated Myawady 2–0 on 18 June, In the semi-finals on 24 June, Shan United secured their place in the final by defeating Ayeyawady United 2–0.

=== Yangon United ===
Yangon United's route to the final
Round	Opposition	Score
Group	Yangon Royals	0–0
Group	Kachin United	7–0
Group	Ayeyawady United	1-0
Group	Mahar United	6-2
QF	Hanthawady United	0–0 (p 3–1)
SF	Yadanarbon	3-1

Yangon United finished the group stage unbeaten in Group B, which included a 1–0 win over Ayeyawady United on 10 May 2025. In the quarter-finals on 19 June 2025, they progressed to the semi-finals after defeating Hanthawady United. On 23 June, Yangon United secured their place in the final at Thuwunna Stadium by defeating Yadanarbon 3–1. Throughout the tournament, the club maintained an undefeated record leading up to the final against Shan United.

== Summary ==
The MNL League Cup final resulted in a 1-0 Yangon United victory over Shan United, securing their fourth MNL League Cup title. Approximately 9,000 people attended the match.

In the 25th minute, Shan United's Myat Kaung Khant took a free kick that was saved by Yangon goalkeeper Zin Nyi Nyi Aung. The first half ended 0–0. In the 54th minute, Japanese forward Aoto Saito scored the only goal of the match for Yangon United following a build-up play on the left side.

Yangon United's defender Hein Zeyar Lin was named Player of the Match.

Yangon United play in the 2025–26 AFC Challenge League qualifying playoffs. Shan United are set to play in the 2025–26 AFC Challenge League group stage.

== Match ==
=== Details ===
6 July 2025
15:30 MST

Yangon United	1–0	Shan United
Aoto Saito 54'	Full match Highlight

Thuwunna Stadium, Yangon
Attendance: 9,000
Referee: U Zaw Zaw

Yangon United	Shan United

GK	1	(Myanmar) Zin Nyi Nyi Aung
RB	4	(Myanmar) David Htan (c)
CB	2	(Myanmar) Hein Zeyar Lin
CB	5	(Myanmar) Kyaw Phyo Wai
LB	22	(Myanmar) Min Kyaw Khant		(yellow card) 27'	(substituted off) 73'
CM	41	(Myanmar) Wai Linn Aung
CM	6	(Myanmar) Arkar Kyaw		(yellow card) 40'	(substituted off) 69'
RM	27	(Myanmar) Aee Soe		(yellow card) 22'	(substituted off) 90+2'
LM	8	(Japan) Aoto Saito	54'		(substituted off) 90+2'
AM	7	(Myanmar) Zaw Win Thein		(yellow card) 65'
CF	29	(Japan) Rintaro Hama			(substituted off) 77'
Substitutes:
GK	75	(Myanmar) San Set Naing
FW	9	(Cameroon) Mogou			(substituted on) 90+2'
FW	10	(Myanmar) Kaung Sithu		(yellow card) 90+6'	(substituted on) 77'
DF	20	(Myanmar) Aung Myo Khant			(substituted on) 73'
DF	26	(Myanmar) Thurein Soe
MF	28	(Myanmar) Thar Yar Win Htet			(substituted on) 90+2'
MF	34	(Myanmar) Chit Aye
DF	46	(Myanmar) Nyan Lin Htet			(substituted on) 69'
MF	47	(Myanmar) Kaung Htet Paing
Manager:
(Myanmar) Kyaw Dunn

GK	13	(Myanmar) Kyaw Zin Phyo
CB	2	(Myanmar) Zwe Khant Min
CB	14	(Brazil) Mauricio	(yellow card) 38'	(substituted off) 83'
CB	4	(Myanmar) Thet Hein Soe
LWB	11	(Myanmar) Hein Phyo Win
DM	6	(Myanmar) Nanda Kyaw (c)	(yellow card) 55'	(substituted off) 57'
CM	17	(Japan) Ryuji Hirota	(yellow card) 22'	(substituted off) 83'
RWB	7	(Japan) Yuki Aizu
AM	21	(Myanmar) Khun Kyaw Zin Hein		(substituted off) 69'
AM	26	(Myanmar) Myat Kaung Khant		(substituted off) 69'
CF	8	(Ghana) Mark Sekyi
Substitutes:
GK	30	(Myanmar) Pyae Phyo Aung
DF	3	(Myanmar) Ye Min Thu
FW	9	(Myanmar) Thurein Tun		(substituted on) 83'
FW	10	(Canada) Jordan Hamilton		(substituted on) 57'
DF	15	(Myanmar) Aung Wunna Soe		(substituted on) 83'
MF	19	(Myanmar) Thet Wai Moe
MF	22	(Myanmar) Hlaing Bo Bo		(substituted on) 72'
DF	24	(Myanmar) Zwe Htet Min
MF	29	(Myanmar) Ye Yint Aung		(substituted on) 69'
Manager:
(Japan) Ono Hiroki

Man of the match

- (Myanmar) Hein Zeyar Lin

Match officials

- Assistant referees:
  - (Myanmar) San Shein Htet
  - (Myanmar) Than Tun Aung
- Fourth official: (Myanmar) Kyaw Zayar Aung
- Match Commissioner: (Myanmar)

Match rules

- 90 minutes.
- 30 minutes of extra-time if necessary.
- Penalty shoot-out if scores still level.
- Nine named substitutes.
- Maximum of five substitutions.

=== Statistics ===
Statistic	Yangon United	Shan United
Goals scored	1	0
Possession	55%	45%
Shots on target	3	3
Shots	5	7
Shots of target	3	0
Corner kicks	4	7
Offsides	1	0
Yellow cards	6	3
Red cards	0	0

== Winner ==
2025 MNL League Cup
Winners
Yangon United

=== Prizes for winner ===
- A championship trophy.
- Ks:350,000,000/- prize money.

=== Prizes for runners-up ===
- Ks.200,000,000/- prize money.

== Broadcasting rights ==
These matches were broadcast live on Myanmar television:

Final Round	Shan United vs Yangon United
Free to Air	MRTV-4 & Channel 7
Live Stream	Pyone Play YouTube
