= 2022 Myanmar National League =

Myanmar National League
- Season: 2022
- Dates: 25 June 2022 - 16 November 2022
- Champions: Shan United
- Runner up: Yangon United
- Matches: 90
- Goals: 269 (2.99 per match)
- Top goalscorer: (Myanmar) Yan Kyaw Htwe (14 goals)
- Best goalkeeper: (Myanmar) Kyaw Zin Phyo, (Myanmar) San Set Naing (10 clean sheets)
- Biggest home win: Hanthawaddy United 10-0 GFA (23 July)
- Biggest away win: GFA 0-7 Yadanarbon (30 June)
- Highest scoring: Hanthawaddy United 10-0 GFA (23 July)
- Longest winning run: Shan United (8 matches)
- Longest unbeaten run: Shan United (17 matches)
- Longest winless run: Rakhine United (16 matches)
- Longest losing run: Rakhine United (11 matches)

The 2022 Myanmar National League season was the 13th edition of the Myanmar National League, the highest domestic league in the country for association football clubs, since its establishment in 2009, also known as MPT Myanmar National League due to the sponsorship deal with Myanma Posts and Telecommunications. Recently, AIA agreed a sponsorship deal with Myanmar National League in order to support both MNL and Myanmar Football.

== Participating teams ==
Title holders Shan United, Hanthawaddy, Ayeyawady, Yangon United, Yadanarbon, Rakhine United, Sagaing United, ISPE, Chinland and Myawady FC are all participating in this year's domestic league, due to the 2021 season was forced to be cancelled due to instability and public unrest. Due to security problem, all matches have to be played in a centralised venue, which is the Thuwunna Stadium in Yangon.

== Clubs ==
=== Personnel and sponsoring ===
Note: Flags indicate national team as has been defined under FIFA eligibility rules. Players may hold more than one non-FIFA nationality.

Team	Head coach	Captain	Kit manufacturer	Shirt sponsor
Ayeyawady United	(Myanmar) U Myo Hlaing Win	(Myanmar) Aung Naing Win	(Myanmar) Pro Sport	
G.F.A	(Myanmar) U KB Siang Cung Lian	(Myanmar) Shwe Win Tun	(Myanmar) SCM	
Hanthawaddy United	(Myanmar) U Myo Min Tun	(Myanmar) Ko Ko Naing	(Myanmar) SCM	(Myanmar) Grand Royal
I.S.P.E	(Myanmar) U Chit Naing	(Myanmar) Zin Nyi Nyi Aung	(Thailand) Grand Sport	
Mahar United	(Myanmar) U Zaw Linn Tun	(Myanmar) Kyaw Swar Min	(Myanmar) M21	
Myawady	(Myanmar) U Maung Maung Aye	(Myanmar) Wai Yan Oo	(Myanmar) SCM	
Rakhine United	(Myanmar) U Kyaw Lwin	(Myanmar) Zaw Zaw Naing	(Thailand) Warrix Sports	(Myanmar) Rakhapura
Shan United	(Myanmar) U Han Win Aung	(Myanmar) Hein Thiha Zaw	(Myanmar) Pro Sport	(Myanmar) KBZ Pay
Yadanarbon	(Myanmar) U Aung Kyaw Moe	(Myanmar) Thet Naing	(Myanmar) M21	(Myanmar) Alpine
Yangon United	(Myanmar) U Min Tun Lin	(Myanmar) Yan Naing Oo	(Myanmar) Pro Sport	(Myanmar) FNI

=== Foreign players ===
Players name in bold indicates the player was registered during the mid-season transfer window.

Club	Player 1	Player 2	Player 3	Player 4	Former Player
Ayeyawady United					
Chinland F.C. (GFA)	(Nigeria) Emmanuel	(Ghana) Yaw Kusi			
Hanthawaddy United					
I.S.P.E F.C.					
Myawady F.C.					
Rakhine United	(Argentina) Dylan Santiago	(Guinea) Conde Mamoudou	(Uganda) Ibrahim Kasule	(Japan) Hiroya Fujibayashi	
Sagaing United					
Shan United	(Ivory Coast) Sunday Mathew	(Ghana) Mark Sekyi			
Yadanarbon					
Yangon United	(Brazil) Valci Júnior				

== Season summary ==
After almost two years of domestic football absence in Myanmar, the league made a surprise return. It consisted of the ten teams that were scheduled to participate in the 2021 Myanmar National League, which was cancelled due to the virus and subsequent protests. This meant that matches were played in only one stadium, the Thuwunna Stadium. Some players returned from international duty with the Myanmar national football team, with the addition of clubs also signing new players.

The opening match was between Myawady and Yangon United. Yangon United won 2–0 with goals from La Min Htwe and new signing Htet Phyo Wai. Two teams that are rivals, but also teams that came close to winning the 2020 Myanmar National League went head-to-head in the first matchday. Hanthawaddy United came out on top against Ayeyawady United. Winning goals were scored by Soe Kyaw Kyaw and Nyi Nyi Aung. The next matches saw Shan United and ISPE defeat Mahar United and Rakhine United. The final match of Week 1 saw an obliteration as returning GFA were thrashed by Yadanarbon by a margin of 7–0.

Following the first week, Hanthawaddy United were given a big confidence boost following their win over Ayeyawady United. However, they were stunned by Mahar United with a goal from Myo Min Phyo, his first of the season. Ayeyawady United's star strikers Yan Kyaw Htwe and Yar Za Aung scored their first goals in an emphatic win over Rakhine United. Myawady bounced back from opening-day defeat with a win over ISPE, while Shan United counted themselves lucky with a narrow win over minnows GFA. The MNL derby took place between Yangon United and Yadanarbon, but Yangon United were the victorious team with great goals from Htet Phyo Wai and David Htan.

Hanthawaddy United continued to lose as they fell into ISPE's hands in the first match of Week 3. The second match saw Yan Kyaw Htwe score a hat-trick over Mahar United, as well as Kaung Myat Thu scoring two and Si Thu Naing scoring his first goal in a 6–1 win. Yadanarbon also lost their second match to Shan United, with an early Nanda Kyaw goal sealing their fate in the match. In the fourth match, GFA narrowly lost to Myawady by a scoreline of 4–2, with Thet Wai Moe, Kaung Si Thu and Ye Moe Yan scoring, with the addition of a surprise Tun Nanda Oo penalty. Consolation goals were scored by Yaw Kusi and Than Toe Aung. Yangon United escaped with another win, this time against Rakhine United with a late goal from David Htan.

Two teams out of form, Hanthawaddy United and Yadanarbon, played out a 1–1 draw, with both goals being penalties. GFA won their first match of the season after another 4–2 result, but this time a win. Shan United escaped with yet another narrow win, this time against ISPE. Min Myat Soe scored two for ISPE, while Nanda Kyaw scored a brace and Sunday Matthew finished ISPE's chances of winning. Yangon United's weaknesses were exposed by Kaung Myat Thu, who scored a hat-trick in the first half, resulting in a 3–0 win for Ayeyawady United. Rakhine United could count themselves unlucky after a late goal scored by Kaung Si Thu for Myawady.

Hanthawaddy used their squad quality to their advantage against GFA, winning 10–0. Soe Kyaw Kyaw and Aung Myat Thu scored hat-tricks. In the next match, Yangon United defeated Mahar United 5–0. Four goals from La Min Htwe and one from Zaw Win Thein got the Lions back on track. Two big matches played out, as Ayeyawady held ISPE to a goalless draw, and Mark Sekyi scored in a win for Shan United against Myawady. Yadanarbon got back on track too, as they defeated Rakhine United 3–0. GFA were included in yet another 4–2 scoreline, but this time in the losing end as Ayeyawady United defeated them. ISPE and Yangon United played out a goalless draw, Shan United defeated Rakhine United with goals from Ti Nyein Min and Ye Min Thu, Myo Min Phyo scoring two in a win against Yadanarbon and Myawady shocking Hanthawaddy United.

Week 7 began with giants facing off: Shan United and Yangon United. Win Naing Tun got a red card, and Zin Min Tun scored the only goal for Shan United. Yadanarbon and Ayeyawady were held to a 0–0 draw. Myawady thrashed Mahar United, Hanthawaddy defeated Rakhine United and ISPE demolished GFA. Following this matchday, Shan United still had a perfect record. Rakhine United also have a perfect record, but for losses instead. Nanda Kyaw scored the winning goal for Shan United against Ayeyawady. Yangon United got back on track with a 2–1 win over Hanthawaddy, with Htet Phyo Wai and Zaw Win Thein scoring the winning goals. Khin Kyaw Win's goal against Mahar United secured ISPE three more points, Yadanarbon eased past Myawady and the two bottom teams faced off: Rakhine United and GFA, with GFA being victors after a late goal from Than Toe Aung.

Following Week 8, the transfer window was reopened. Yangon United signed veteran Valci Teixeira Junior. Shan United signed Si Thu Aung, Myat Kaung Khant and Zin Phyo Aung. Rakhine United signed multiple foreign players including Dylan Santiago, Conde Mamoudou, Ibrahim Kasule and Hiroya Radonjic.

With the transfer window still open, Week 9 played with the opening match consisting of out-of-form Hantharwady United, and in-form Shan United. The match ended 2–2, ending Shan United's winning streak. Myo Zaw Oo scored the opening goal, but it was cancelled off by Kyaw Zin Lwin. Mark Sekyi scored a bicycle kick but Aung Myo Thura scored the equalizer. Naing Zin Htet's hat-trick gave Myawady a win over Ayeyawady United, and a Mahar United eased 2–1 past Rakhine United. Kyaw Phyo Wai and Junior scored their first goals for Yangon United in a win over GFA, and Week 9 ended with Yadanarbon overwhelming ISPE 3–1. Two goals from Thet Naing led Yadanarbon to victory.

Week 10 saw a late goal from Nanda Kyaw in a narrow 1–0 win over Myawady. Conde Mamodou lost 2–4 loss to Yadanarbon. Win Naing Tun, Sa Aung Pyae Ko and Yan Paing Soe scored their first Yangon United goals in a 3–0 win over Mahar United. Hantharwady defeated GFA, this time by a narrow scoreline. Yan Kyaw Htwe continued his strong goalscoring form alongside a goal from Aung Naing Win. Week 11 saw giants facing each other again, but in a goalless draw. Yangon United and Shan United defences held firm until 90 minutes for a point each. Another lucky goal from Hantharwady saw them earn a narrow win over Rakhine United. GFA lost 3–1 to ISPE, while Ayeyawady United defeated Yadanarbon with some controversy surrounding the match. Mahar United lost 2–1 against Myawady, in which the goals came late in the game.

Myanmar national team head coach Antoine Hey had called up 25 players for friendly matches in Hong Kong, in which they lost one and drew one. Due to this, matches were postponed to the end of the season. However, two of Mahar United's matches were continued. They lost both matches, against Hantharwady and GFA.

Week 14 matches started with Yadanarbon playing Shan United. Thet Naing scored the operner but it was later cancelled out by Zin Min Tun in the 25th minute for a 1–1 draw. After this, Yangon United trounced Rakhine United 10–0 with five goals from Win Naing Tun, a hat-trick for Valci Jr. and goals from Hein Zeyar Lin and Yan Naing Oo. More goals came in the next match, as Ayeyawady defeated Mahar United 6–1. Hantharwady and Myawady then defeated ISPE and GFA respectively.

Shan United became one step closer to winning the MNL title in Week 15 as they defeated Mahar United 2–0. Rakhine United lost 4–1 to ISPE and Ayeyawady and Hantharwady's match ended in the same scoreline in favour of Hantharwady with goals from Nay Moe Naing and Win Moe Kyaw. Valci Jr. scored the lone goal in a Yangon United win against Myawady. Yadanarbon defeated GFA 1–0 in the final match of Week 15. Shan United needed a lucky edge to defeat out-of-form Ayeyawady United. Hantharwady's win against Yangon United created a huge gap in the top of the table and also equalled points with Yangon United, who still had a match to play. ISPE and Mahar United shared points and Yadanarbon won against a winless Myawady side in multiple matches. The bottom of the table teams drew 2–2.

Yangon United defeated ISPE 3–0. Yadanarbon failed to use their chances to full effect in a goalless draw against Mahar United. An 8-goal game saw Ayeyawady defeat GFA 5–3, and Hantharwady continued their great form in a win against Myawady. Rakhine United got relegated after a 2–0 loss against Shan United. ISPE defied odds in a 2–1 win against Yadanarbon, and Myawady finally won a match after four consecutive losses. Rakhine United won their first match of the season against Mahar United, and Yangon eased past GFA.

Shan United played Hantharwady United in a match that saw Shan United prevail and thus secure the Myanmar National League. This was their third consecutive title and fourth overall. Myat Kaung Khant scored a long-range goal, and Si Thu Aung finished the match off with a penalty to secure the title. The win resulted in Shan United qualifying for the AFC Cup group stage, and Yangon United locking their spot in the playoffs. Shan United were given a standing ovation by GFA whom they defeated 2–0 with goals from Si Thu Aung. GFA were relegated and will have to play in MNL-2 next season.

Another Myanmar National League match was played between two fierce rivals: Yadanarbon and Yangon United. Valci Jr. scores a goal to the top corner and opens the scoring in the 18th minute. Before the first half ended, Junior scored his second goal and eighth of the season with another goal, this time from a rebound. David Htan scored his third goal of the season with Win Naing Tun's near-cross, and Sa Aung Pyae Ko scored his third of the season shortly after coming on. Ye Yint Aung scored a consolation penalty and Thu Rein Soe scored an own goal. Hlaing Bo Bo was given his second red card of the season after complaining to the referee, seeing him leave the pitch in tears and slam his water bottle.

== League table ==
Pos	Team	Pld	W	D	L	GF	GA	GD	Pts	QR
1	Shan United	18	15	3	0	31	8	+23	48	Qualification for 2023 AFC Cup group stage and ASEAN Club Championship play off
2	Yangon United	18	12	3	3	37	8	+29	39	Qualification for 2023 AFC Cup play-off round and ASEAN Club Championship play off
3	Hanthawaddy United	18	10	2	6	34	15	+19	32	
4	Myawady	18	10	1	7	29	18	+11	31	
5	Ayeyawady United	18	8	4	6	34	20	+14	28	
6	Yadanarbon	18	8	4	6	30	19	+11	28	
7	ISPE	18	7	4	7	25	24	+1	25	
8	Mahar United	18	3	2	13	15	50	−35	11	
9	GFA	18	3	1	14	21	59	−38	10	
10	Rakhine United	18	1	2	15	13	48	−35	5	

Updated to match(es) played on 15 Sept 2022. Source: Soccerway
Rules for classification: 1) Points; 2) Head-to-head points; 3) Head-to-head goal difference; 4) Head-to-head goals scored; 5) Goal difference; 6) Goals scored.

=== Positions by round ===
Team ╲ Round	1	2	3	4	5	6	7	8	9	10	11	12	13	14	15	16	17	18
Ayeyawady United	7	4	3	2	3	2	2	4	5	5	4							
GFA	10	10	10	8	9	9	9	9	9	9	9	9	9	9	9	9	9	9
Hanthawaddy United	4	5	7	7	5	6	6	7	7	6	6				3	3	3	3
I.S.P.E	3	6	5	5	7	5	5	5	6	7	7	7	7	7	7	7	7	7
Mahar United	9	8	8	9	8	8	8	8	8	8	8	8	8	8	8	8	8	8
Myawady	8	7	4	3	4	4	3	3	3	3	3							
Rakhine United	6	9	9	10	10	10	10	10	10	10	10	10	10	10	10	10	10	10
Shan United	2	1	1	1	1	1	1	1	1	1	1	1	1	1	1	1	1	1
Yadanarbon	1	3	6	6	6	7	7	6	4	4	5							
Yangon United	5	2	2	4	2	3	4	2	2	2	2	2	2	2	2	2	2	

Qualification to the 2023-24 AFC Cup
Qualification to the 2023-24 AFC Cup playoffs
Relegation to the MNL-2
Relegation to the MNL-2

Source: =2022 MNL

=== Results by match played ===
Team ╲ Round	1	2	3	4	5	6	7	8	9	10	11	12	13	14	15	16	17	18
Ayeyawady United	L	W	W	W	D	W	L	L	L	W	W	D	D	W	L	L	W	L
GFA	L	L	L	W	L	L	L	W	L	L	L	L	W	L	L	W	L	L
Hanthawaddy United	W	L	L	D	W	L	W	L	D	W	W	W	W	W	W	W	W	L
I.S.P.E	W	L	W	L	D	D	W	W	L	L	W	D	L	L	W	D	L	W
Mahar United	L	W	L	L	L	W	L	L	W	L	L	L	L	L	L	D	D	L
Myawady	L	W	W	W	L	W	W	L	W	L	W	D	W	W	L	L	L	W
Rakhine United	L	L	L	L	L	L	L	L	L	L	L	D	L	L	L	L	L	W
Shan United	W	W	W	W	W	W	W	W	D	W	D	W	W	D	W	W	W	W
Yadanarbon	W	L	L	D	W	L	D	W	W	W	L	L	L	D	W	W	D	L
Yangon United	W	W	W	L	W	D	L	W	W	W	D	W	D	W	W	L	W	W

Source: =2022 MNL
W = Win; D = Draw; L = Lose

== Results ==
Home \ Away	AYU	GFA	HTU	ISP	MHU	MWD	RKU	SHU	YAD	YGU
Ayeyawady United	—	5–3	0–2	0–0	6–1	1–3	3–0	1–2	2–1	3–0
GFA	2–4	—	0–1	1–3	4–2	2–4	2–2	0–2	0–7	0–2
Hanthawaddy United	2–0	10–0	—	3–1	0–1	3–1	1–0	2–2	1–1	1–0
I.S.P.E	0–2	5–1	1–0	—	2–2	0–0	3–1	2–3	2–1	0–0
Mahar United	1–6	1–2	0–3	0–1	—	0–4	1–3	1–5	2–1	0–3
Myawady	2–1	5–1	1–0	2–0	2–1	—	2–1	0–1	0–1	0–2
Rakhine United	0–0	1–2	1–3	1–4	1–2	0–3	—	0–2	2–4	0–1
Shan United	1–0	2–1	2–0	1–0	2–0	1–0	2–0	—	1–0	1–0
Yadanarbon	0–0	1–0	2–1	3–1	0–0	2–0	3–0	1–1	—	2–4
Yangon United	0–0	2–0	2–1	3–0	5–0	1–0	10–0	0–0	2–0	—

Updated to match(es) played on 13 August 2022. Source:
Legend: Blue = home team win; Yellow = draw; Red = away team win.

== Matches ==
Fixtures and results of the Myanmar National League 2022 season.

=== Week 1 ===
25/6/2022	Myawady FC	0–2	Yangon United	Thuwunna Stadium, Yangon
15:00 UTC+06:30			La Min Htwe 13'; Htet Phyo Wai 37'

26/6/2022	Hanthawaddy United	2–0	Ayeyawady United	Thuwunna Stadium, Yangon
15:00 UTC+06:30	Soe Kyaw Kyaw 8' (pen.); Nyi Nyi Aung 13'

27/6/2022	Mahar United	1–5	Shan United	Thuwunna Stadium, Yangon
15:00 UTC+06:30	Thura Min Naing 34'		Mark Sekyi 21', 86'; Sa Aung Pyae Ko 41'; Ye Min Thu 70'; Ti Nyein Minn 77'

29/6/2022	I.S.P.E	3–1	Rakhine United	Thuwunna Stadium, Yangon
15:00 UTC+06:30	Khin Kyaw Win 21', 89'; Pyae Phyo Khaing 81'		Zaw Zaw Naing 5' (pen.)

30/6/2022	GFA	0–7	Yadanarbon	Thuwunna Stadium, Yangon
15:00 UTC+06:30			Ye Yint Aung 14', 36'; Myo Ko Tun 24'; Thet Naing 54'; Thyne Phwet Aung 56'; Bi Bi 64'; Hein Nay San 89'

=== Week 2 ===
2/7/2022	Hanthawady United	0–1	Mahar United	Thuwunna Stadium, Yangon
15:00 UTC+06:30			Myo Min Phyo 47'

3/7/2022	Ayeyawady United	3–0	Rakhine United	Thuwunna Stadium, Yangon
15:00 UTC+06:30	Yan Kyaw Htwe 25'; Yazar Aung 49', 78'

4/7/2022	Myawady	2–0	I.S.P.E	Thuwunna Stadium, Yangon
15:00 UTC+06:30	Wai Yan Oo 43'; Thet Paing Ko 73'

6/7/2022	Shan United	2–1	GFA	Thuwunna Stadium, Yangon
15:00 UTC+06:30	Sunday Mathew 11'; Kyaw Zin Lwin 57'		Tun Lin Aung 86'

7/7/2022	Yangon United	2–0	Yadanarbon	Thuwunna Stadium, Yangon
15:00 UTC+06:30	Htet Phyo Wai 45+2'; David Htan 74'

=== Week 3 ===
9/7/2022	I.S.P.E	1–0	Hanthawaddy United	Thuwunna Stadium, Yangon
15:00 UTC+06:30	Lin Htet Soe 38'

10/7/2022	Mahar United	1–6	Ayeyawady United	Thuwunna Stadium, Yangon
15:00 UTC+06:30	Nay Oo Lwin 5'		Yan Kyaw Htwe 14', 68', 71'; Kaung Myat Thu 34', 39'; Sithu Naing 77'

11/7/2022	Shan United	1–0	Yadanarbon	Thuwunna Stadium, Yangon
15:00 UTC+06:30	Nanda Kyaw 5'

13/7/2022	GFA	2–4	Myawady	Thuwunna Stadium, Yangon
15:00 UTC+06:30	Yaw Kusi 50'; Tan Toe Aung 78' (pen.)		Thet Wai Moe 5'; Kaung Sithu 31'; Tun Nanda Oo 45+1' (pen.); Yell Moe Yan 85'

14/7/2022	Rakhine United	0–1	Yangon United	Thuwunna Stadium, Yangon
15:00 UTC+06:30			David Htan 86'

=== Week 4 ===
16/7/2022	Hanthawady United	1–1	Yadanarbon	Thuwunna Stadium, Yangon
15:00 UTC+06:30	Soe Kyaw Kyaw 73' (pen.)		Myo Ko Tun 59' (pen.)

17/7/2022	GFA	4–2	Mahar United	Thuwunna Stadium, Yangon
15:00 UTC+06:30	James Emmanuel 17'; Than Toe Aung 19'; Htet Aung 69'; John Babu 73'		Soe Min Naing 15'; Mg Mg Che 89' (o.g.)

18/7/2022	I.S.P.E	2–3	Shan United	Thuwunna Stadium, Yangon
15:00 UTC+06:30	Min Myat Soe 45+1', 62'		Nanda Kyaw 7' (pen.), 56'; Sunday Mathew 83'

20/7/2022	Ayeyawady United	3–0	Yangon United	Thuwunna Stadium, Yangon
15:00 UTC+06:30	Kaung Myat Thu 4', 18', 27'

21/7/2022	Myawady	2–1	Rakhine United	Thuwunna Stadium, Yangon
15:00 UTC+06:30	Thet Wai Moe 90'; Kaung Sithu 90+5'		Zayar Naing 2'

=== Week 5 ===
23/7/2022	Hanthawady United	10–0	GFA	Thuwunna Stadium, Yangon
15:00 UTC+06:30	Soe Kyaw Kyaw 8', 20', 51'; Khun Kyaw Zin Hein 12', 27'; Ye Lin Htet 29'; Aung Myat Thu 47', 50', 59'; Nyi Nyi Aung 81'

24/7/2022	Yangon United	5–0	Mahar United	Thuwunna Stadium, Yangon
15:00 UTC+06:30	Zaw Win Thein 33'; La Min Htwe 43', 70', 89', 90+2' (pen.)

25/7/2022	Ayeyawady United	0–0	ISPE	Thuwunna Stadium, Yangon
15:00 UTC+06:30

27/7/2022	Myawady	0–1	Shan United	Thuwunna Stadium, Yangon
15:00 UTC+06:30			Mark Sekyi 27'

28/7/2022	Yadanarbon	3–0	Rakhine United	Thuwunna Stadium, Yangon
15:00 UTC+06:30	Ye Yint Aung 10', 19' (pen.); Thet Naing 54'

=== Week 6 ===
30/7/2022	GFA	2–4	Ayeyawady United	Thuwunna Stadium, Yangon
15:00 UTC+06:30	Than Toe Aung 43'; Maung Maung Soe 65'		Yazar Aung 28'; Yan Kyaw Htwe 37', 46', 59'

31/7/2022	ISPE	0–0	Yangon United	Thuwunna Stadium, Yangon
15:00 UTC+06:30

1/8/2022	Shan United	2–0	Rakhine United	Thuwunna Stadium, Yangon
15:00 UTC+06:30	Ti Nyein Minn 56'; Ye Min Thu 83'

3/8/2022	Mahar United	2–1	Yadanarbon	Thuwunna Stadium, Yangon
15:00 UTC+06:30	Myo Min Phyo 4', 57'		Bi Bi 44'

4/8/2022	Myawady	1–0	Hanthawady United	Thuwunna Stadium, Yangon
15:00 UTC+06:30	Naing Zin Htet 68'

=== Week 7 ===
6/8/2022	Shan United	1–0	Yangon United	Thuwunna Stadium, Yangon
15:00 UTC+06:30	Zin Min Tun 40'

7/8/2022	Yadanarbon	0–0	Ayeyawady United	Thuwunna Stadium, Yangon
15:00 UTC+06:30

8/8/2022	Mahar United	0–4	Myawady	Thuwunna Stadium, Yangon
15:00 UTC+06:30			Wai Yan Oo 45+1'; Naing Zin Htet 77', 82'; Thet Wai Moe 87'

10/8/2022	Rakhine United	1–3	Hanthawaddy United	Thuwunna Stadium, Yangon
15:00 UTC+06:30	Paing Htet Ko 3'		Nyi Nyi Aung 27'; Soe Kyaw Kyaw 45' (pen.); Kyaw Min Than 73'

11/8/2022	ISPE	5–1	GFA	Thuwunna Stadium, Yangon
15:00 UTC+06:30	Lin Htet Soe 11'; Khin Kyaw Win 18', 61'; Min Myat Soe 42'; Aung Zayar Phyo 85'		Maung Maung Soe 71'

=== Week 8 ===
13/8/2022	Shan United	1–0	Ayeyawady United	Thuwunna Stadium, Yangon
15:00 UTC+06:30	Nanda Kyaw 33'

14/8/2022	Yangon United	2–1	Hanthawady United	Thuwunna Stadium, Yangon
15:00 UTC+06:30	Htet Phyo Wai 31'; Zaw Win Thein 67'		Myo Zaw Oo 9'

15/8/2022	Mahar United	0–1	ISPE	Thuwunna Stadium, Yangon
15:00 UTC+06:30			Khin Kyaw Win 53'

17/8/2022	Yadanarbon	2–0	Myawady	Thuwunna Stadium, Yangon
15:00 UTC+06:30	Thet Naing 37'; Ye Yint Aung 56'

18/8/2022	Rakhine United	1–2	GFA	Thuwunna Stadium, Yangon
15:00 UTC+06:30	Ibrahim Kasule 85'		Yaw Kusi 14'; Than Toe Aung 90+1'

=== Week 9 ===
20/8/2022	Hanthawady United	2–2	Shan United	Thuwunna Stadium, Yangon
15:00 UTC+06:30	Myo Zaw Oo 45'; Aung Myo Thu Ra 87'		Kyaw Zin Lwin 47'; Mark Sekyi 53'

21/8/2022	Ayeyawady United	1–3	Myawady	Thuwunna Stadium, Yangon
15:00 UTC+06:30	Zaw Lin 21'		Naing Zin Htet 4', 12', 55'

22/8/2022	Rakhine United	1–2	Mahar United	Thuwunna Stadium, Yangon
15:00 UTC+06:30	Than Kyaw Htay 35'		Soe Min Naing 7'; Kyaw Swar Min 21'

24/8/2022	Yangon United	2–0	GFA	Thuwunna Stadium, Yangon
15:00 UTC+06:30	Kyaw Phyo Wai 8'; Valci Júnior 14'

25/8/2022	Yadanarbon	3–1	ISPE	Thuwunna Stadium, Yangon
15:00 UTC+06:30	Thet Naing 4', 31'; Ye Yint Aung 44'		Kyi Soe 90+2'

=== Week 10 ===
3/9/2022	Shan United	1–0	Myawady	Thuwunna Stadium, Yangon
15:00 UTC+06:30	Nanda Kyaw 90+2'

4/9/2022	Rakhine United	2–4	Yadanarbon	Thuwunna Stadium, Yangon
15:00 UTC+06:30	Conde 39', 90+2'		Myo Ko Tun 20', 75'; Ye Yint Aung 56'; Myint Thein Tun 86' (pen.)

5/9/2022	Mahar United	0–3	Yangon United	Thuwunna Stadium, Yangon
15:00 UTC+06:30			Win Naing Tun P 58'; Sa Aung Pyae Ko 77'; Yan Pai Soe 90+1'

7/9/2022	GFA	0–1	Hanthawady United	Thuwunna Stadium, Yangon
15:00 UTC+06:30			Aung Moe Htwe(1) 74'

8/9/2022	ISPE	0–2	Ayeyawdy United	Thuwunna Stadium, Yangon
15:00 UTC+06:30			Yan Kyaw Htwe 35' (pen.); Aung Naing Win 62'

=== Week 11 ===
10/9/2022	Yangon United	0–0	Shan United	Thuwunna Stadium, Yangon
15:00 UTC+06:30

11/9/2022	Hanthawady United	1–0	Rakhine United	Thuwunna Stadium, Yangon
15:00 UTC+06:30	Zin Min Tun 75'

12/9/2022	GFA	1–3	ISPE	Thuwunna Stadium, Yangon
15:00 UTC+06:30	Maung Maung Soe 31'		Khin Kyaw Win 23', 90'; Aye Chan Thar 86'

14/9/2022	Ayeyawday United	2–1	Yadanarbon	Thuwunna Stadium, Yangon
15:00 UTC+06:30	Yan Kyaw Htwe 45+1'; Yazar Aung 57'		Ye Yint Aung 43' (pen.)

15/9/2022	Myawady	2–1	Mahar United	Thuwunna Stadium, Yangon
15:00 UTC+06:30	Thiha Zaw 83'; Naing Zin Htet 90+1'		Efe Obode 28'

=== Week 12 ===
19/9/2022	Mahar United	0–3	Hanthawady United	Thuwunna Stadium, Yangon
15:00 UTC+06:30			Nay Moe Naing 21', 81'; Zin Min Tun 68'

6/11/2022	GFA	0–2	Shan United	Thuwunna Stadium, Yangon
15:00 UTC+06:30			Sithu Aung 8', 73' (pen.)

7/11/2022	Yadanarbon	2–4	Yangon United	Thuwunna Stadium, Yangon
15:00 UTC+06:30	Ye Yint Aung 85' (pen.); Thurein Soe 87' (o.g.)		Valci Junior 17', 44'; David Htan 55'; Sa Aung Pyae Ko 75'

8/11/2022	ISPE	0–0	Myawady	Thuwunna Stadium, Yangon
15:00 UTC+06:30

9/11/2022	Rakhine United	0–0	Ayeyawady United	Thuwunna Stadium, Yangon
15:00 UTC+06:30

=== Week 13 ===
24/9/2022	Mahar United	1–2	GFA	Thuwunna Stadium, Yangon
15:00 UTC+06:30	Soe Min Naing 42'		Saw Si I 3'; Than Toe Aung 72'

12/11/2022	Yadanarbon	1–2	Hanthawady United	Thuwunna Stadium, Yangon
15:00 UTC+06:30	Myint Tun Thein 66', 72'		Shin Thant Aung 42'

14/11/2022	Rakhine United	0–3	Myawady	Thuwunna Stadium, Yangon
15:00 UTC+06:30			Thet Wai Moe 3'; Hein Zeyar Min 45'; Thet Paing Ko 87'

15/11/2022	Yangon United	0–0	Ayeyawady United	Thuwunna Stadium, Yangon
15:00 UTC+06:30

16/11/2022	Shan United	1–0	ISPE	Thuwunna Stadium, Yangon
15:00 UTC+06:30	Nanda Kyaw 51'

=== Week 14 ===
1/10/2022	Yadanarbon	1–1	Shan United	Thuwunna Stadium, Yangon
15:00 UTC+06:30	Thet Naing 20'		Zin Min Tun 25'

2/10/2022	Yangon United	10–0	Rakhine United	Thuwunna Stadium, Yangon
15:00 UTC+06:30	Win Naing Tun 18', 30', 53', 89', 90+1'; Valci Júnior 44', 45+1', 55'; Yan Naing Oo 26'; Hein Zayar Lin 72'

3/10/2022	Ayeyawady United	6–1	Mahar United	Thuwunna Stadium, Yangon
15:00 UTC+06:30	Kaung Myat Thu 14', 34'; Yan Kyaw Htwe 38', 70'; Nyi Nyi Aung 78'; Aung Min Thu 85'		Thura Min Naing 44'

5/10/2022	Hanthawady United	3–1	ISPE	Thuwunna Stadium, Yangon
15:00 UTC+06:30	Nyi Nyi Aung 22', 43'; Win Moe Kyaw 79'		Kyi Soe 81'

6/10/2022	Myawady	5–1	GFA	Thuwunna Stadium, Yangon
15:00 UTC+06:30	Naing Zin Htet 21'; Htet Lin Aung 37'; Thet Wai Moe 43', 51'; Kaung Sithu 69'		Kalep 83'

=== Week 15 ===
8/10/2022	Shan United	2–0	Mahar United	Thuwunna Stadium, Yangon
15:00 UTC+06:30	Myat Kaung Khant 35'; Nanda Kyaw 50'

9/10/2022	Rakhine United	1–4	ISPE	Thuwunna Stadium, Yangon
15:00 UTC+06:30	Thein Than Win 42'		Min Myat Soe 5'; Thein Zaw Thiha 50', 54'; Kyaw Myo Naing 90+3'

10/10/2022	Ayeyawady United	0–2	Hanthawaddy United	Thuwunna Stadium, Yangon
15:00 UTC+06:30			Nay Moe Naing 9'; Win Moe Kyaw 55'

12/10/2022	Yangon United	1–0	Myawady	Thuwunna Stadium, Yangon
15:00 UTC+06:30	Valci Junior 48' (pen.)

13/10/2022	Yadanarbon	1–0	GFA	Thuwunna Stadium, Yangon
15:00 UTC+06:30	Thet Naing 34'

=== Week 16 ===
15/10/2022	Ayeyawady United	1–2	Shan United	Thuwunna Stadium, Yangon
15:00 UTC+06:30	Yan Kyaw Htwe 57'		Sunday Mathew 20'; Zin Min Tun 70'

16/10/2022	Hanthawady United	1–0	Yangon United	Thuwunna Stadium, Yangon
15:00 UTC+06:30	Lar Din Maw Yar 75'

17/10/2022	ISPE	2–2	Mahar United	Thuwunna Stadium, Yangon
15:00 UTC+06:30	Wai Lin Aung 63'; Zar Ni 69'		Htet Zaw Tun 4'; Efe Obode 72'

19/10/2022	Myawady	0–1	Yadanarbon	Thuwunna Stadium, Yangon
15:00 UTC+06:30			Myo Ko Tun 20'

20/10/2022	GFA	2–2	Rakhine United	Thuwunna Stadium, Yangon
15:00 UTC+06:30	Than Toe Aung 72'; Hlaing Myo Aung 78'		Than Kyaw Htay 6'; Thet Tun Aung 45+1'

=== Week 17 ===
22/10/2022	Yangon United	3–0	ISPE	Thuwunna Stadium, Yangon
15:00 UTC+06:30	Htet Phyo Wai 17'; Thurein Soe 29'; Valci Junior 44' (pen.)

23/10/2022	Yadanarbon	0–0	Mahar United	Thuwunna Stadium, Yangon
15:00 UTC+06:30

24/10/2022	Ayeyawady United	5–3	GFA	Thuwunna Stadium, Yangon
15:00 UTC+06:30	Nyi Nyi Aung 7', 75'; Yan Kyaw Htwe 37', 52'; Yarzar Aung 45+1'		Kalep 16'; Than Toe Aung 72' (pen.), 74'

26/10/2022	Hanthawady United	3–1	Myawady	Thuwunna Stadium, Yangon
15:00 UTC+06:30	Khun Kyaw Zin Hein 74', 82'; Aung Myat Thu 97'		Thant Zin Htwe 12'

20/10/2022	Rakhine United	0–2	Shan United	Thuwunna Stadium, Yangon
15:00 UTC+06:30			Ye Min Thu 28'; Sithu Aung 44'

=== Week 18 ===
29/10/2022	ISPE	2–1	Yadanarbon	Thuwunna Stadium, Yangon
15:00 UTC+06:30	Kyi Soe 21'; Zar Ni 47'		Ye Yint Aung 19' (pen.)

30/10/2022	Myawady	2–1	Ayeyawady United	Thuwunna Stadium, Yangon
15:00 UTC+06:30	Thet Pai Ko 30'; Aung Thu 74'		Nyi Nyi Aung 20'

31/10/2022	Mahar United	1–3	Rakhine United	Thuwunna Stadium, Yangon
15:00 UTC+06:30	Wai Phyo Thu 18'		Conde 14'; Zaw Zaw Naing 53'; Than Toe Aung 90+5'

2/11/2022	GFA	0–2	Yangon United	Thuwunna Stadium, Yangon
15:00 UTC+06:30			Kyaw Phyo Wai 79'; Lamin Htwe 82'

3/11/2022	Shan United	2–0	Hanthawady United	Thuwunna Stadium, Yangon
15:00 UTC+06:30	Myat Kaung Khant 20'; Sithu Aung 62' (pen.)

This is the statistics of 2022 Myanmar National League.

== Season statistics ==
=== Top scorers ===
As of 20 Nov 2022.

Rank	Player	Club	Goals
1	(Myanmar) Yan Kyaw Htwe	Ayeyawady United	14
2	(Myanmar) Ye Yint Aung	Yadanarbon	10
3	(Brazil) Valci Júnior	Yangon United	8
3	(Myanmar) Naing Zin Htet	Myawady	8
3	(Myanmar) Than Toe Aung	GFA	8
3	(Myanmar) Kaung Myat Thu	Ayeyawady United	7
3	(Myanmar) Khin Kyaw Win	ISPE	7
3	(Myanmar) Nanda Kyaw	Shan United	7
4	(Myanmar) Soe Kyaw Kyaw	Hanthawaddy United	6
4	(Myanmar) Thet Wai Moe	Myawady	6
4	(Myanmar) Thet Naing	Yadanarbon	6
4	(Myanmar) Win Naing Tun	Yangon United	6
4	(Myanmar) La Min Htwe	Yangon United	6
5	(Myanmar) Yazar Aung	Ayeyawady United	5
5	(Myanmar) Nyi Nyi Aung	Hanthawaddy United	5
5	(Myanmar) Myo Ko Tun	Yadanarbon	5
6	(Myanmar) Nyi Nyi Aung	Ayeyawady United	4
6	(Myanmar) Aung Myat Thu	Hanthawaddy United	4
6	(Myanmar) Min Myat Soe	ISPE	4
6	(Ghana) Mark Sekyi	Shan United	4
6	(Myanmar) Sithu Aung	Shan United	4
6	(Myanmar) Htet Phyo Wai	Yangon United	4
7	(Myanmar) Myo Min Phyo	Mahar United	3
7	(Myanmar) Soe Min Naing	Mahar United	3
7	(Myanmar) Kaung Sithu	Myawady	3
7	(Myanmar) Wai Yan Oo	Myawady	3
7	(Myanmar) Thet Paing Ko	Myawady	3
7	(Guinea) Conde	Rakhine United	3
7	(Ivory Coast) Sunday Mathew	Shan United	3
7	(Myanmar) Ye Min Thu	Shan United	3
7	(Myanmar) Zin Min Tun	Shan United	3
7	(Myanmar) Myint Tun Thein	Yadanarbon	3
7	(Myanmar) David Htan	Yangon United	3
7	(Myanmar) Sa Aung Pyae Ko	Yangon United	3
8	(Myanmar) Kaung Myat Thu	Ayeyawady United	2
8	(Ghana) Yaw Kusi	GFA	2
8	(Myanmar) Maung Maung Soe	GFA	2
8	(Myanmar) Kalep	GFA	2
8	(Myanmar) Myo Zaw Oo	Hanthawaddy United	2
8	(Myanmar) Khun Kyaw Zin Hein	Hanthawaddy United	2
8	(Myanmar) Zin Min Tun	Hanthawaddy United	2
8	(Myanmar) Nay Moe Naing	Hanthawaddy United	2
8	(Myanmar) Win Moe Kyaw	Hanthawaddy United	2
8	(Myanmar) Lin Htet Soe	ISPE	2
8	(Myanmar) Thein Zaw Thiha	ISPE	2
8	(Myanmar) Kyi Soe	ISPE	2
8	(Myanmar) Zar Ni	ISPE	2
8	(Myanmar) Thura Min Naing	Mahar United	2
8	(Nigeria) Efe Obode	Mahar United	2
8	(Myanmar) Zaw Zaw Naing	Rakhine United	2
8	(Myanmar) Than Kyaw Htay	Rakhine United	2
8	(Myanmar) Ti Nyein Minn	Shan United	2
8	(Myanmar) Kyaw Zin Lwin	Shan United	2
8	(Myanmar) Myat Kaung Khant	Shan United	2
8	(Myanmar) Bi Bi	Yadanarbon	2
8	(Myanmar) Zaw Win Thein	Yangon United	2
8	(Myanmar) Kyaw Phyo Wai	Yangon United	2
9	(Myanmar) Sithu Naing	Ayeyawady United	1
9	(Myanmar) Zaw Lin	Ayeyawady United	1
9	(Myanmar) Shin Thant Aung	Ayeyawady United	1
9	(Myanmar) Aung Min Thu	Ayeyawady United	1
9	(Myanmar) Tun Lin Aung	GFA	1
9	(Nigeria) James Emmanuel	GFA	1
9	(Myanmar) Saw Si I	GFA	1
9	(Myanmar) Hlaing Myo Aung	GFA	1
9	(Myanmar) Htet Aung	GFA	1
9	(Myanmar) John Babu	GFA	1
9	(Myanmar) Kyaw Min Than	Hanthawaddy United	1
9	(Myanmar) Lar Din Maw Yar	Hanthawaddy United	1
9	(Myanmar) Aung Moe Htwe (1)	Hanthawaddy United	1
9	(Myanmar) Aung Myo Thu Ra	Hanthawaddy United	1
9	(Myanmar) Ye Lin Htet	Hanthawaddy United	1
9	(Myanmar) Pyae Phyo Khaing	ISPE	1
9	(Myanmar) Aye Chan Thar	ISPE	1
9	(Myanmar) Kyaw Myo Naing	ISPE	1
9	(Myanmar) Wai Lin Aung	ISPE	1
9	(Myanmar) Aung Zayar Phyo	ISPE	1
9	(Myanmar) Nay Oo Lwin	Mahar United	1
9	(Myanmar) Kyaw Swar Min	Mahar United	1
9	(Myanmar) Wai Phyo Thu	Mahar United	1
9	(Myanmar) Htet Zaw Tun	Mahar United	1
9	(Myanmar) Thant Zin Htwe	Myawady	1
9	(Myanmar) Aung Thu	Myawady	1
9	(Myanmar) Htet Lin Aung	Myawady	1
9	(Myanmar) Hein Zeyar Min	Myawady	1
9	(Myanmar) Thiha Zaw	Myawady	1
9	(Myanmar) Tun Nanda Oo (GK)	Myawady	1
9	(Myanmar) Yell Moe Yan	Myawady	1
9	(Myanmar) Than Toe Aung	Rakhine United	1
9	(Myanmar) Thet Tun Aung	Rakhine United	1
9	(Myanmar) Thein Than Win	Rakhine United	1
9	(Myanmar) Zayar Naing	Rakhine United	1
9	(Nigeria) Ibrahim Kasule	Rakhine United	1
9	(Myanmar) Paing Htet Ko	Rakhine United	1
9	(Myanmar) Thyne Phwet Aung	Yadanarbon	1
9	(Myanmar) Hein Nay San	Yadanarbon	1
9	(Myanmar) Thurein Soe	Yangon United	1
9	(Myanmar) Yan Pai Soe	Yangon United	1
9	(Myanmar) Yan Naing Oo	Yangon United	1
9	(Myanmar) Hein Zayar Lin	Yangon United	1

=== Most assists ===
As of 15 Dec 2022.

Rank	Player	Club	Assists
1	(Myanmar) David Htan	Yangon United	7
2	(Myanmar) Khun Kyaw Zin Hein	Hanthawaddy United	6
3	(Myanmar) Thet Wai Moe	Myawady	5
3	(Myanmar) Yan Kyaw Htwe	Ayeyawady United	5
3	(Myanmar) Kyaw Zin Lwin	Shan United	5
3	(Myanmar) Myat Kaung Khant	Shan United	5
3	(Myanmar) Yan Naing Oo	Yangon United	5
4	(Myanmar) Yazar Aung	Ayeyawady United	4
4	(Myanmar) Win Moe Kyaw	Hanthawaddy United	4
4	(Myanmar) Thiha Zaw	Myawady	4
4	(Myanmar) Nanda Kyaw	Shan United	4
4	(Myanmar) Zaw Win Thein	Yangon United	4
5	(Myanmar) Aung Naing Win	Ayeyawady United	3
5	(Myanmar) Si Thu Naing	Ayeyawady United	3
5	(Myanmar) Ye Lin Htet	Hanthawaddy United	3
5	(Myanmar) Aung Myat Thu	Hanthawaddy United	3
5	(Myanmar) Moe Swe Aung	ISPE	3
5	(Myanmar) Wai Lin Aung	ISPE	3
5	(Myanmar) Thein Zaw Thiha	ISPE	3
5	(Myanmar) Yell Moe Yan	Myawady	3
5	(Myanmar) Kyaw Swar Min	Mahar United	3
5	(Myanmar) Zaw Zaw Naing	Rakhine United	3
5	(Ivory Coast) Sunday Mathew	Shan United	3
5	(Myanmar) Kaung Myat Kyaw	Shan United	3
5	(Myanmar) Myo Ko Tun	Yadanarbon	3
5	(Myanmar) Ye Yint Aung	Yadanarbon	3
5	(Myanmar) Thyne Phwet Aung	Yadanarbon	3
5	(Myanmar) Htet Phyo Wai	Yangon United	3
6	(Myanmar) Kaung Myat Thu	Ayeyawady United	2
6	(Myanmar) Nyi Nyi Aung	Ayeyawady United	2
6	(Myanmar) Mung Theih Pau	GFA	2
6	(Nigeria) Emmanuel	GFA	2
6	(Myanmar) John Hui Hleih	GFA	2
6	(Myanmar) Aung Moe Htwe	Hanthawaddy United	2
6	(Myanmar) Aye Chan Thar	ISPE	2
6	(Myanmar) Min Myat Soe	ISPE	2
6	(Myanmar) Soe Min Naing	Mahar United	2
6	(Myanmar) Myo Min Phyo	Mahar United	2
6	(Myanmar) Hein Zeyar Min	Myawady	2
6	(Myanmar) Bi Bi	Yadanarbon	2
6	(Myanmar) Hein Nay San	Yadanarbon	2
6	(Myanmar) Nyein Chan Soe	Yadanarbon	2
6	(Myanmar) Min Kyaw Khant	Yangon United	2
6	(Myanmar) Kyaw Min Oo	Yangon United	2
6	(Myanmar) Win Naing Tun	Yangon United	2
7	(Myanmar) Yan Naing Lin	Ayeyawady United	1
7	(Myanmar) Zin Maung	Ayeyawady United	1
7	(Myanmar) Aung Zeya	Ayeyawady United	1
7	(Myanmar) Tin Win Aung	Ayeyawady United	1
7	(Myanmar) Zaw Lin	Ayeyawady United	1
7	(Myanmar) Ye Pyae Sone	Ayeyawady United	1
7	(Myanmar) Aung Ko Lat (GK)	Ayeyawady United	1
7	(Ghana) Yaw Kusi	GFA	1
7	(Myanmar) John Babu	GFA	1
7	(Myanmar) Htet Aung	GFA	1
7	(Myanmar) Hlaing Myo AUng	GFA	1
7	(Myanmar) Thet Lwin Win	GFA	1
7	(Myanmar) Soe Kyaw Kyaw	Hanthawaddy United	1
7	(Myanmar) Arkar	Hanthawaddy United	1
7	(Myanmar) Myo Zaw Oo	Hanthawaddy United	1
7	(Myanmar) Yan Naing Aung	Hanthawaddy United	1
7	(Myanmar) Ye Yint Aung	Hanthawaddy United	1
7	(Myanmar) Kyaw Min Than	Hanthawaddy United	1
7	(Myanmar) Htet Lin Lin	Hanthawaddy United	1
7	(Myanmar) Nyi Nyi Phyo	ISPE	1
7	(Myanmar) Lin Htet Soe	ISPE	1
7	(Myanmar) Kyi Soe	ISPE	1
7	(Myanmar) Zar Ni	ISPE	1
7	(Myanmar) Saw Than Ko Than	ISPE	1
7	(Myanmar) Kyaw Myo Naing	ISPE	1
7	(Myanmar) Than Zaw Myo	Mahar United	1
7	(Myanmar) Htike Htike Aung	Mahar United	1
7	(Myanmar) Htet Zaw Tun	Mahar United	1
7	(Myanmar) Wai Yan Oo	Myawady	1
7	(Myanmar) Kaung Sithu	Myawady	1
7	(Myanmar) Aung Thu	Myawady	1
7	(Myanmar) Thant Zin Aung	Myawady	1
7	(Myanmar) Hein Zeyar Min	Myawady	1
7	(Myanmar) Htet Linn Aung	Myawady	1
7	(Myanmar) Thaw Zin Htwe	Myawady	1
7	(Myanmar) Htet Wai Phyoe	Myawady	1
7	(Myanmar) Soe Min Oo	Myawady	1
7	(Myanmar) Than Toe Aung	Rakhine United	1
7	(Myanmar) Mg Hlwan	Rakhine United	1
7	(Myanmar) Thet Tun Aung	Rakhine United	1
7	(Myanmar) Than Kyaw Htay	Rakhine United	1
7	(Myanmar) Aung Ko Ko Lwin	Rakhine United	1
7	(Myanmar) Kyaw Sithu Hein	Rakhine United	1
7	(Brazil) Santiago	Rakhine United	1
7	(Myanmar) Soe Lwin Lwin	Shan United	1
7	(Ghana) Mark Sekyi	Shan United	1
7	(Myanmar) Zar Nay Ya Thu	Shan United	1
7	(Myanmar) Moe Swe	Yadanarbon	1
7	(Myanmar) Tin Thein	Yadanarbon	1
7	(Myanmar) Thet Naing	Yadanarbon	1
7	(Myanmar) Hlaing Bo Bo	Yadanarbon	1
7	(Myanmar) Aung Wunna Soe	Yadanarbon	1
7	(Myanmar) Yan Pai Soe	Yangon United	1
7	(Myanmar) Sa Aung Pyae Ko	Yangon United	1
7	(Myanmar) Kyaw Phyo Wai	Yangon United	1
7	(Myanmar) Yan Kyaw Soe	Yangon United	1

=== Clean sheets ===
As of 20 Nov 2022.

Rank	Player	Club	Clean sheets
1	(Myanmar) Kyaw Zin Phyo	Shan United	10
1	(Myanmar) San Set Naing	Yangon United	10
2	(Myanmar) Pyae Phyo Thu	Yadanarbon	7
3	(Myanmar) Pyae Phyo Aung	Hantharwady United	6
4	(Myanmar) Zin Nyi Nyi Aung	ISPE	5
4	(Myanmar) Tun Nanda Oo	Myawady	5
5	(Myanmar) Aung Myo Htwe	Ayeyawady United	4
6	(Myanmar) Ko Ko Naing	Hantharwady United	3
6	(Myanmar) Phone Thit Sar Min	Yangon United	3
7	(Myanmar) A Zin Hmue	Mahar United	2
8	(Myanmar) Aung Ko Lat	Ayeyawady United	1
8	(Myanmar) Tun Aung Kyaw	Ayeyawady United	1
8	(Myanmar) Aung Mg Mg Myo	Rakhine United	1
