= 2019 MFF Charity Cup =

Yangon United	Shan United
1	1
- Date: 6 January 2019
- Venue: Aung San Stadium, Yangon
- Man of the Match: (Myanmar) David Htan
- Weather: Sunny; 29 °C (84 °F)

The 2019 MFF Charity Cup (also known as the 2019 MPT Charity Cup for sponsorship reasons) is the 8th Charity Cup, an annual football match played between the winners of the previous National League and Domestic Cup competitions. It was held at Aung San Stadium on 6 January 2018. The match was played between Yangon United, champions of the 2018 Myanmar National League and Shan United, runner-up of the 2018 Myanmar National League.

This was Yangon United's 5th Cup appearance and Shan United's 3rd time Cup appearance, they won Charity Cup for the first time as Kanbawza FC in 2016.

== Match ==
=== Details ===
7 January 2018
16:00 MST

Yangon United	1-1	Shan United
Kekere Moukailou 62'	Report	Maycon 25'
Penalties
Sylla Sekou (penalty scored); Kekere Moukailou (penalty scored); Kyi Lin (penalty missed); Yan Lin Aung (penalty scored); Kosuke Uchida (penalty missed)	3–4	(penalty scored) Maycon; (penalty scored) Hedipo; (penalty scored) Nanda Kyaw; (penalty missed) Zwe Thet Paing; (penalty scored) David Htan

Bogyoke Aung San Stadium, Yangon
Attendance: 15,000
Referee: (Myanmar)

Yangon United	Shan United

GK	75	(Myanmar) Sann Satt Naing
RB	17	(Myanmar) Zarni Htet	(yellow card) 43'
CB	44	(Ivory Coast) Kekere Moukailou
CB	2	(Myanmar) Min Ko Thu
LB	23	(Myanmar) Pyae Phyo Aung		(substituted off) 45'
CM	25	(Myanmar) Yan Aung Kyaw (c)		(substituted off) 45'
RW	11	(Myanmar) Maung Maung Lwin		(substituted off) 40'
LW	19	(Myanmar) Kyaw Zin Oo
AM	20	(Japan) Kosuke Uchida
CF	24	(Myanmar) Kaung Htet Soe		(substituted off) 69'
CF	15	(Guinea) Sylla Sekou
Substitutes:
GK	12	(Myanmar) Wai Lin Aung
DF	3	(Myanmar) Pyae Phyo Zaw
MF	4	(Myanmar) Yan Lin Aung		(substituted on) 45'
MF	6	(Brazil) Vinicius Miller
FW	8	(Myanmar) Soe Min Naing		(substituted on) 69'
MF	10	(Myanmar) Kyi Lin	(yellow card) 49'	(substituted on) 40'
DF	14	(Myanmar) Nan Wai Min
FW	27	(Myanmar) Aee Soe
DF	34	(Myanmar) Thiha Zaw		(substituted on) 45'
Manager:
(Myanmar) Mr. Myo Min Tun

GK	1	(Myanmar) Thiha Sithu
RB	4	(Myanmar) David Htan
CB	17	(Myanmar) Aung Show Thar Maung (c)		(substituted off) 61'
CB	6	(Myanmar) Nanda Kyaw
LB	5	(Myanmar) Hein Thiha Zaw	(yellow card) 45'
CM	26	(Myanmar) Set Phyo Wai		(substituted off) 79'
CM	14	(Japan) Ryo Nakamura		(substituted off) 61'
CM	11	(Myanmar) Yan Naing Oo	(yellow card) 76'	(substituted off) 75'
RW	19	(Myanmar) Shwe Ko	(yellow card) 51'	(substituted off) 61'
LW	70	(Brazil) Hedipo
CF	10	(Brazil) Maycon
Substitutes:
GK	13	(Myanmar) Myo Min Latt
DF	3	(Myanmar) Htike Htike Aung
MF	6	(Myanmar) Tin Win Aung
MF	12	(Myanmar) Suan Lam Mang		(substituted on) 61'
FW	16	(Myanmar) Zwe Thet Paing		(substituted on) 75'
FW	25	(Myanmar) Thet Paing Htoo		(substituted on) 79'
DF	33	(Brazil) Dedimar Ferreira		(substituted on) 61'
DF	44	(Myanmar) Ye Yint Tun		(substituted on) 61'
FW	77	(Myanmar) Dway Ko Ko Chit
Manager:
(Myanmar) Mr. Min Thu

Man of the match

- (Myanmar) David Htan

Match officials

- Assistant referees:
  - (Myanmar)
  - (Myanmar)
- Fourth official: (Myanmar)
- Reserve official: (Myanmar)
- Match Commissioner: (Myanmar)

Match rules

- 90 minutes.
- Penalty shoot-out if scores still level.
- Nine named substitutes.
- Maximum of five substitutions.

=== Statistics ===
Statistic	Shan United	Yangon United
Goals scored	1	1
Possession	50%	50%
Shots on target	4	7
Shots off target	2	3
Corner kicks	5	11
Fouls	19	11
Offsides	5	1
Yellow cards	2	3
Red cards	0	0
