= 2025 MNL League Cup =

Tournament details
- Country: Myanmar
- City: Yangon
- Venue: Thuwunna Stadium
- Dates: 29 April 2025 – 6 July 2025
- Teams: 20

Final positions
- Champions: Yangon United (fourth title)
- Runners-up: Shan United
- Challenge League: Yangon United

Tournament statistics
- Matches played: 46
- Goals scored: 199 (4.33 per match)
- Top goal scorer: Yan Kyaw Htwe (7 goals)

Awards
- Best player: Hein Zeyar Lin

The 2025 Myanmar National League Cup (also known as the 2025 MNL League Cup) was the 11th edition of Myanmar's premier knockout football competition, previously known as the General Aung San Shield. The tournament featured clubs from both the Myanmar National League (MNL-1) and the MNL-2, with group stages before progressing to the knockout rounds. The competition took place from April 29 to July 6, 2025, and concluded with Yangon United defeating Shan United in the 2025 MNL League Cup Final. In result, Yangon qualified to the preliminary round of the 2025–26 AFC Challenge League.

== Group A ==
Pos	Team	Pld	W	D	L	GF	GA	GD	Pts	Qualification
1	Shan United	4	3	1	0	25	2	+23	10	advance to Quartar-final
2	Dagon Port	4	2	1	1	13	11	+2	7	advance to Quartar-final
3	Thitsar Arman	4	1	3	0	8	4	+4	6	
4	University FC	4	1	1	2	14	7	+7	4	
5	Young Boy	4	0	0	4	2	38	−36	0	

Source: Flashscore
MNL

=== Matchday 1 ===
29 April 2025
15:30 UTC+6:30

Shan United	16–0	Young Boy United
Khun Kyaw Zin Hein 14', 42', 50'; Myat Kaung Khant 16', 76'; Hein Phyo Win 29'; Sa Aung Pyae Ko 36'; Ye Yint Aung 38', 40', 60', 79'; Peter Aung Wai Htoo 48', 65', 81'; Zwe Htet Min 53', 63'

Thuwunna Stadium, Yangon

29 April 2025
15:30 UTC+6:30

University	1–1	Thitsar Arman
Aung Win Khant 51'		Shine Wunna Aung 26'

University Stadium, Yangon

=== Matchday 2 ===
4 May 2025
15:30 UTC+6:30

Shan United	1–0	University
Hein Phyo Win 84'

YUSC Stadium, Yangon

4 May 2025
15:30 UTC+6:30

Dagon Port	6–1	Young Boys
Yar Zar Aung 41', 65'; Guy Michel 49', 50', 90+3'; Hlaing Myint Thu 53'		Win Min Htut 58'

University Stadium, Yangon

=== Matchday 3 ===
10 May 2025
15:30 UTC+6:30

Young Boys	0–4	Thitsar Arman
		Hla Tun 45'; Min Maw Oo 72'; Naing Win Tun 74'; Myat Phone Khant 79'

Padonmar Stadium, Yangon

10 May 2025
15:30 UTC+6:30

Dagon Port	1–7	Shan United
Michel 59'		Thu Rein Tun 6'; Myat Kaung Khant 37', 87'; Ye Yint Aung 38'; Jordan 67' (pen.); Mark Sekyi 90+2'

YUSC Stadium, Yangon

=== Matchday 4 ===
16 May 2025
15:30 UTC+6:30

Dagon Port	4–1	University
Kyaw Myo Naing 14'; Michel 25', 50'; Myo Thuya Tun 87'		Aung Myint Myat 37'

University Stadium, Yangon

16 May 2025
15:30 UTC+6:30

Thitsar Arman	1–1	Shan United
Min Maw Oo 18'		Ryuji Hirota 69'

YUSC Stadium, Yangon

=== Matchday 5 ===
21 May 2025
15:30 UTC+6:30

Young Boys	1–12	University
Min Lat Soe 55'		Aung Myint Myat 16' (pen.); Zin Myo Aung 19', 42', 67', 69'; Than Myat Soe 22', 87'; Khun Than OO 30'; Aung Win Khant 48', 76', 80', 81'

YUSC Stadium, Yangon

=== Matchday 6 ===
14 June 2025
15:30 UTC+6:30

Thitsar Arman	2–2	Dagon Port
Min Maw Oo 59'; Saw Myo Zaw 79'		Nyein Chan Soe 65'; Yazar Aung 90+4'

YUSC Stadium, Yangon

== Group B ==
Pos	Team	Pld	W	D	L	GF	GA	GD	Pts	Qualification
1	Yangon United	4	3	1	0	14	2	+12	10	advance to Quarter-final
2	Ayeyawady United	4	2	1	1	8	1	+7	7	advance to Quarter-final
3	Yangon Royals	4	0	4	0	1	1	0	4	
4	Mahar United	4	1	1	2	5	9	−4	4	
5	Kachin United	4	0	1	3	1	16	−15	1	

Source: Flashscore
MNL

=== Matchday 1 ===
29 April 2025
16:00 UTC+6:30

Yangon United	0–0	Yangon Royals

YUSC Stadium, Yangon

29 April 2025
16:00 UTC+6:30

Kachin United	1–2	Mahar United
Moubarak 42'		Kaung Myat Thu 5'; Toe Sat Naing 86'

Padonmar Stadium, Yangon

=== Matchday 2 ===
4 May 2025
15:30 UTC+6:30

Yangon United	7–0	Kachin United
Oakkar Naing 3'; Mogou 18', 22', 59', 85'; Hein Zayar Lin 44'; Chit Aye 78'

Thuwunna Stadium, Yangon

4 May 2025
15:30 UTC+6:30

Ayeyawady United	0–0	Yangon Royal

University Stadium, Yangon

=== Matchday 3 ===
10 May 2025
15:30 UTC+6:30

Ayeyawady United	0–1	Yangon United
		Pyae Phyo Zaw 37' (o.g.)

Thuwunna Stadium, Yangon

10 May 2025
15:30 UTC+6:30

Yangon Royals	1–1	Mahar United
Hein Htet Sithu 53'		Kyaw Ko Ko 90+8' (pen.)

University Stadium, Yangon

=== Matchday 4 ===
16 May 2025
15:30 UTC+6:30

Kachin United	0–7	Ayeyawady United
		Aung Kyaw Naing 39', 42', 85'; Nan Htike Zaw 51'; Zwe Pyae Aung 57'; Hein Htet Aung 76'; Kyaw Zin Lwin 84'

Padonmar Stadium, Yangon

16 May 2025
15:30 UTC+6:30

Mahar United	2–6	Yangon United
Kyaw Ko Ko 40'; Kaung Myat Thu 45+2'		Mogou 20'; Thar Yar Win Htet 23'; Aoto Saito 30'; Aee Soe 42', 55'; Kaung Sithu 90+1'

Thuwunna Stadium, Yangon

=== Matchday 5 ===
21 May 2025
15:30 UTC+6:30

Yangon Royal	0–0	Kachin United

University Stadium, Yangon

=== Matchday 6 ===
14 June 2025
15:30 UTC+6:30

Ayeyawady United	1–0	Mahar United
Yan Naing Lin 58'

Padonmar Stadium, Yangon

== Group C ==
Pos	Team	Pld	W	D	L	GF	GA	GD	Pts	Qualification
1	Rakhine United	4	2	2	0	15	4	+11	8	advance to Quarter-final
2	Hanthawaddy United	4	2	2	0	9	1	+8	8	advance to Quarter-final
3	Chinland	4	1	2	1	5	7	−2	5	
4	ISPE	4	1	2	1	7	7	0	5	
5	Glory Goal	4	0	0	4	1	18	−17	0	

Source: Flashscore
MNL

=== Matchday 1 ===
30 April 2025
16:00 UTC+6:30

Hanthawady United	5–0	Glory Goals
Wine Hlu 5'; Maung Maung Soe 41'; Zwe Man Thar 61'; Zaw Zaw Hteik 80', 90+1'

Thuwunna Stadium, Yangon

30 April 2025
15:30 UTC+6:30

Chinland	2–2	ISPE
Hla Phone 6'; Hein Thet Phyo 48'		Win Pyae Maung 37'; Hein Htet Nyein 56'

University Stadium, Yangon

=== Matchday 2 ===
5 May 2025
16:00 UTC+6:30

Hanthawady United	0–0	Chinland

Thuwunna Stadium, Yangon
5 May 2025
16:00 UTC+6:30

Rakhine United	8–0	Glory Goals
Khin Kyaw Win 3', 55', 75', 88'; Than Kyaw Htay 14'; Romeo 45+1'; Min Khant Kyaw 84'; Zin Min Tun 87'

University Stadium, Yangon

=== Matchday 3 ===
11 May 2025
16:00 UTC+6:30

Glory Goals	0–3	ISPE
		Thein Zaw Thiha 42', 45+2'; Saw Sae Ka Paw 63'

University Stadium, Yangon

12 May 2025
16:00 UTC+6:30

Rakhine United	1–1	Hanthawady United
Khin Kyaw Win 18'		Zaw Zaw Hteik 52'

YSUC Stadium, Yangon

=== Matchday 4 ===
17 May 2025
15:30 UTC+6:30

Chinland	1–4	Rakhine United
Hla Phone Oo 57'		Bomba 13'; Than Kyaw Htay 29'; Sithu Aung 45+2', 79'

University Stadium, Yangon

17 May 2025
15:30 UTC+6:30

ISPE	0–3	Hanthawady United
		Than Toe Aung 40' (pen.); Min Htoo Eain Lin 74'; Arkar 80'

YUSC Stadium, Yangon

=== Matchday 5 ===
21 May 2025
15:30 UTC+6:30

Glory Goals	1–2	Chinland
Htun Win Moe 71'		Hla Phone Oo 61' (pen.), 87' (pen.)

Padonmar Stadium, Yangon

=== Matchday 6 ===
14 June 2025
15:30 UTC+6:30

ISPE	2–2	Rakhine United
Win Pyae Maung 39'; Khaing Ye Win 64' (pen.)		Aung Hlaing Win 48'; Than Kyaw Htay 57'

Thuwunna Stadium, Yangon

== Group D ==
Pos	Team	Pld	W	D	L	GF	GA	GD	Pts	Qualification
1	Yadanarbon	4	3	0	1	13	6	+7	9	advance to Quarter-final
2	Myawady	4	3	0	1	12	6	+6	9	advance to Quarter-final
3	Dagon Star United	4	2	1	1	17	7	+10	7	
4	Yarmanya United F.C.	4	1	1	2	12	15	−3	4	
5	Silver Stars	4	0	0	4	7	27	−20	0	

Source: Flashscore
MNL

=== Matchday 1 ===
30 April 2025
15:30 UTC+6:30

Yarmanya United	2–6	Yadanarbon
Lwin Myo Aung 75'; Chan Nyein 76'		Pyay Moe 39', 59'; Yan Kyaw Soe 52'; Wai Yan Phyo 57'; Soe Htet WIn 82'; Soe Kyaw Kyaw 90+3'

Padonmar Stadium, Yangon

29 April 2025
16:00 UTC+6:30

Dagon Star United	11–2	Sliver Stars
Suan Lam Mang 12'; Yan Kyaw Htwe 24', 28', 67', 68', 73'; Yan Naing Oo 42'; Moe Swe 63'; Htet Phyo Wai 72', 90+1'; Nyein Chan Aung 90+3'		Aung Aung 64'; Nyi Nyi Tun 82'

YUSC Stadium, Yangon

=== Matchday 2 ===
5 May 2025
16:00 UTC+6:30

Dagon Star United	2–2	Yarmanya United
Yan Kyaw Htwe 41'; Zar Nay Ya Thu 44'		Lwin Myo Aung 9'; Zaw Win Maung 21'

YUSC Stadium, Yangon

5 May 2025
15:30 UTC+6:30

Myawady	6–1	Sliver Stars
Thiha Aung 23'; Naing Zin Htet 44', 83', 76'; Kaung Htet Lin 78'; Thu Thu Aung 88'		Nyi Nyi Tun 68'

Padonmar Stadium, Yangon

=== Matchday 3 ===
11 May 2025
16:00 UTC+6:30

Myawady	0–3	Dagon Star United
		Swan Htet 18', 24'; Htet Phyo Wai 76'

Thuwunna Stadium, Yangon

11 May 2025
16:00 UTC+6:30

Silver Stars	0–2	Yadanarbon
		Pyae Moe 71' (pen.); Soe Min Oo 82'

Padonmar Stadium, Yangon

=== Matchday 4 ===
17 May 2025
15:30 UTC+6:30

Yarmanya United	0-3	Myawady
		Naing Zin Htet 39'; Kaung Htet Lin 57', 75'

Padonmar Stadium, Yangon

17 May 2025
15:30 UTC+6:30

Yadanarbon	3–1	Dagon Star United
Aung Thu Rein 39'; Pyae Moe 49' (pen.); Myo Zaw Oo 90+5'		Yan Kyaw Htwe 7'

Thuwunna Stadium, Yangon

=== Matchday 5 ===
21 May 2025
15:30 UTC+6:30

Silver Stars	4–8	Yarmanya United
Aung Pyae Sone 22'; Thet Win Htun 29'; Min Thant Naing 45'; Win Zaw Hein 90+5'		Phoo Khant Kyaw 35'; Bhone Khant Aung 40'; Chan Nyein 61'; Hein Htet Zaw Win 75'; Lwin Myo Aung 77', 84'; Than Toe AUng 79'; Wau Yan Htet 90+2'

Thuwunna Stadium, Yangon

=== Matchday 6 ===
14 June 2025
15:30 UTC+6:30

Yadanarbon	2–3	Myawady
Myo Zaw Oo 45+1'; Hein Zayar Min 51' (pen.)		Naing Zin Htet 4' (pen.); Htet Lin Aung 24'; Soe Thet Maung 80'

YUSC Stadium, Yangon

== Knockout stage ==
=== Bracket ===
All times are local, MMT (UTC+6:30).

Quarter-finals
18 June – Yangon (YUSC)
Dagon Port	0 (6)
Yadanarbon	0 (7)
19 June – Yangon (TWN)
Yangon United	0 (3)
Hantharwady United	0 (1)
19 June – Yangon (YUSC)
Rakhine United	0
Ayeyawady United	3
18 June– Yangon (TWN)
Myawady	0
Shan United	2

Semi-finals
23 June – Yangon (TWN)
Yadanarbon	1
Yangon United	3
24 June – Yangon (TWN)
Ayeyawady United	0
Shan United	2

Final
6 July – Yangon (TWN)
Yangon United	1
Shan United	0

=== Quarter-finals ===
The quarter-finals would be featured 8 clubs that were the winners of the each groups,

18 June 2025	Dagon Port	0–0 (a.e.t.) (6–7 p)	Yadanarbon	Yangon
15:30 (UTC+6:30)		Highlight		Stadium: YUSC; Referee: Khin Maung Soe; Assistant referees: Than Tun Aung, Myo Aung; Fourth official: Kyaw Zall Lwin
	Penalties
	Naung Naung Soe (penalty scored); Guy Michel (penalty scored); Kyaw Myo Naing (penalty scored); Ye Win Hlaing (penalty scored); Lamin Htwe (penalty scored); Pyae Sone Lin (penalty scored); Si Thu Naing (penalty missed)		(penalty scored) Pyae Moe; (penalty scored) Lu Min Chit; (penalty scored) Soe Htet Win; (penalty scored) Samuel Ngai Kee; (penalty scored) Nay Oo Lwin; (penalty scored) Myo Zaw Oo; (penalty scored) Hein Zaw Naing

18 June 2025	Myawady	0–2	Shan United	Yangon
15:30 (UTC+6:30)		Highlight	Myat Kaung Khant 9'; Thet Hein Soe 45+1'	Stadium: Thuwunna Stadium; Referee: Zaw Zaw; Assistant referees: Chit Moe Aye, Htet Thu Aung; Fourth official: Zaw Zaw Aung

19 June 2025	Rakhine United	0–3	Ayeyawady United	Yangon
15:30 (UTC+6:30)		Highlights	Thiha 21'; Yan Naing Lin 77'; Aung Kyaw Naing 80'	Stadium: YUSC; Referee: Aung Myint Kyaw; Assistant referees: San Shine Htet, Kyaw Thet Maung; Fourth official: Thura Zaw

19 June 2025	Yangon United	0–0 (a.e.t.) (3–1 p)	Hantharwady United	Yangon
15:30 (UTC+6:30)		Highlights		Stadium: Thuwunna Stadium; Referee: Thant Zin Oo; Assistant referees: Zayar Maung, Thant Zaw Moe; Fourth official: Kyaw Zayar Aung
	Penalties
	Zaw Win Thein (penalty scored); Kaung Sithu (penalty missed); Aung Myo Khant (penalty scored); Myo Sett Paing (penalty scored)		(penalty missed) Thu Ya Zaw; (penalty missed) Min Htoo Eain Lin; (penalty scored) Maung Maung Soe; (penalty missed) Win Moe Kyaw

=== Semi-finals ===
23 June 2025	Yadanarbon	1–3	Yangon United	Yangon
15:30 (UTC+6:30)	Pyae Moe 34'	Highlights	Thar Yar Win Htet 6'; Kaung Sithu 88'; Aee Soe 90+5'	Stadium: Thuwunna Stadium; Referee: Kyaw Zayar Aung; Assistant referees: Chit Moe Aye, San Shein Htet; Fourth official: Nyein Chan Aung

24 June 2025	Ayeyawady United	0–2	Shan United	Yangon
15:30 (UTC+6:30)			Mark Sekyi 51'; Hamilton 57'	Stadium: Thuwunna Stadium; Referee: Thura Zaw; Assistant referees: Zayar Maung, Than Tun Aung; Fourth official: Zaw Zaw Aung

==== Final ====
6 July 2025	Yangon United	1–0	Shan United	Yangon
15:30 (UTC+6:30)	Aoto Saito 54'	Report		Stadium: Thuwunna Stadium; Attendance: 10,000; Referee: U Zaw Zaw

== Season statistics ==
=== Top goalscorers ===
Rank	Player	Club	Goals
1	(Myanmar) Yan Kyaw Htwe	Dagon Star United	7
2	(Myanmar) Ye Yint Aung	Shan United	5
2	(Myanmar) Khin Kyaw Win	Rakhine United	5
2	(Myanmar) Aung Win Khant	University	5
2	(Cameroon) Guy Micheal	Dagon Port	5
2	(Myanmar) Myat Kaung Khant	Shan United	5
2	(Myanmar) Pyae Moe	Yadanarbon	5
2	(Cameroon) Mogou	Yangon United	5
2	(Myanmar) Naing Zin Htet	Myawady	5
3	(Myanmar) Zin Myo Aung	University	4
3	(Myanmar) Hla Phone Oo	Chinland	4
3	(Myanmar) Lwin Myo Aung	Yarmanya United	4
3	(Myanmar) Aung Kyaw Naing	Ayeyawady United	4

=== Hat-tricks ===
Player	For	Against	Result	Date
(Myanmar) Khun Kyaw Zin Hein	Shan United	Young Boys	16–0	29 April 2025
(Myanmar) Ye Yint Aung	Shan United	Young Boys	16–0	29 April 2025
(Myanmar) Peter Aung Wai Htoo	Shan United	Young Boys	16–0	29 April 2025
(Myanmar) Yan Kyaw Htwe	Dagon Star United	Silver Stars	11–2	30 April 2025
(Cameroon) Mogou	Yangon United	Kachin United	7–0	4 May 2025
(Cameroon) Guy Michel	Dagon Port	Young Boys	6–1	4 May 2025
(Myanmar) Aung Kyaw Naing	Ayeyawady United	Kachin United	7–0	16 May 2025

== Official partners ==
- AYA Bank
- AYA Pay

== See also ==
- 2025-26 Myanmar National League
- Myanmar National League Cup
- MNL-2
