= Kunihiro Yamashita =

Japanese footballer

Personal information
- Full name: Kunihiro Yamashita
- Date of birth: 29 May 1986 (age 40)
- Place of birth: Kashiwa, Chiba, Japan
- Height: 1.82 m (5 ft 11 1/2 in)
- Position: Centre-back

Youth career
- 2005–2008: Ryutsu Keizai University

Senior career*
Years	Team	Apps	(Gls)
2009–2010	Roasso Kumamoto	3	(0)
2010–2012	Albirex Niigata Singapore	60	(6)
2013–2014	Tampines Rovers	23	(4)
2015	Hougang United	24	(6)
2016	Yangon United	25	(3)
2017	Borneo	31	(2)
2018	Perseru Serui	28	(2)
Total		194	(23)
- * Club domestic league appearances and goals

Kunihiro Yamashita (山下 訓広, Yamashita Kunihiro; born 29 May 1986) is a Japanese former football player. He plays as a centre back.

== Honours ==
Tampines Rovers

- Singapore League Cup: 2011

Borneo

- Indonesia President's Cup runner-up: 2017

Yangon United

- MFF Charity Cup: 2016

== Career statistics ==
Club	Season	League		Emperor's Cup		J.League Cup		Asia		Total	
Club	Season	Apps	Goals	Apps	Goals	Apps	Goals	Apps	Goals	Apps	Goals
Roasso Kumamoto	2009	2	0	0	0	0	0	0	0	2	0
Roasso Kumamoto	2010	1	0	0	0	0	0	0	0	1	0
Roasso Kumamoto	Total	3	0	0	0	0	0	0	0	3	0
Club	Season	League		Singapore Cup		League Cup		Asia		Total	
Club	Season	Apps	Goals	Apps	Goals	Apps	Goals	Apps	Goals	Apps	Goals
Albirex Niigata (S)	2010	16	0	0	0	0	0	0	0	16	0
Albirex Niigata (S)	2011	14	2	3	0	0	0	0	0	17	2
Albirex Niigata (S)	2012	21	4	3	0	3	0	0	0	27	4
Albirex Niigata (S)	Total	60	6	6	0	3	0	0	0	60	4
Tampines Rovers	2013	20	3	1	0	3	0	0	0	24	3
Tampines Rovers	2014	13	2	2	0	4	0	0	0	19	2
Tampines Rovers	Total	33	5	3	0	7	0	0	0	43	5
Hougang United	2015	24	6	2	0	0	0	0	0	26	6
Hougang United	Total	24	6	2	0	0	0	0	0	26	6
Club	Season	League		General Aung San Shield		League Cup		Asia		Total	
Club	Season	Apps	Goals	Apps	Goals	Apps	Goals	Apps	Goals	Apps	Goals
Yangon United	2016	25	3	0	0	0	0	0	0	25	3
Yangon United	Total	25	3	0	0	0	0	0	0	25	3
Club	Season	League		Piala Indonesia		League Cup		Asia		Total	
Club	Season	Apps	Goals	Apps	Goals	Apps	Goals	Apps	Goals	Apps	Goals
Borneo	2017	31	2	0	0	0	0	0	0	31	2
Borneo	Total	31	2	0	0	0	0	0	0	31	2
Perseru Serui	2018	28	2	0	0	0	0	0	0	28	2
Perseru Serui	Total	28	2	0	0	0	0	0	0	28	2
Badak Lampung	2019	9	0	0	0	0	0	0	0	9	0
Badak Lampung	Total	9	0	0	0	0	0	0	0	9	0
Career Total		47	1	2	0	0	0	0	0	49	1
