= 2016 MFF Charity Cup =

Ayeyawady United	Yangon United
0	1
- Date: 3 January 2016
- Venue: Aung San Stadium, Yangon
- Man of the Match: (Myanmar) Kyi Lin
- Referee: (Myanmar) U Thant Zin Oo
- Attendance: 9,000
- Weather: Sunny; 32 °C (90 °F)

The 2016 MFF Charity Cup is the 5th MFF Charity Cup, an annual Myanmar football match played between the winners of the previous season's Myanmar National League and 2015 General Aung San Shield. The match was contested by Ayeyawady United, the 2015 General Aung San Shield winners, and Yangon United, champions of the 2015 Myanmar National League. It is held at Aung San Stadium on 3 January 2016.

This was Yangon United's 3rd Cup appearance and Ayeyawady United's 3rd.

== Background and pre-match ==
Yangon United qualified for the 2016 MFF Charity Cup as winners of the 2015 Myanmar National League. It was the club's fourth league title in 6 years. The other Charity Cup place went to Ayeyawady United, who defeated Yadanarbon FC by two goals to win the 2015 General Aung San Shield Final and retain the trophy. Yangon United made their fourth appearance in the Charity Cup; prior to this they won once (2013) and lost twice, most recently in 2014 against Kanbawza. By contrast, Ayeyawady United made their fourth Chairity Cup appearance, and won twice. They went into the match as holders of the Shield, having defeated Yadanarbon FC a year earlier. Both clubs had only twice met before in the Shield, when Ayeyawady United won by penalty(7-5) in 2012 and Yangon United won by one goal in 2013.

== Match ==
=== Team selection ===
Yangon United's coach did not choose Aung Wai Phyo and Marcelo Fernandez. Yangon United F.C. choose Ayeyawady United F.C. former player Kyaw Min Oo in their first line-up. Ayeyawady United Coach,U Kyaw Lwin did't take Aung Hein Kyaw and Sa Htet Naing Win.

=== Details ===
3 January 2015
16:00 MST

Ayeyawady United	0 - 1	Yangon United
	Report	(Brazil) Adilson 31'

Bogyoke Aung San Stadium, Yangon
Attendance: 9,000
Referee: (Myanmar) U Thant Zin Oo

Ayeyawady United	Yangon United FC

GK	1	(Myanmar) Vanlal Hruala (c)
RB	2	(Myanmar) San Myo Oo
CB	6	(Myanmar) Arkar Naing	(yellow card) 55'	(substituted off) 58'
CB	26	(Ghana) Hanson Samuel
LB	5	(Myanmar) Thein Naing Oo
LM	10	(Myanmar) Thiha Zaw		(substituted off) 74'
CM	17	(Myanmar) Nay Moe Aung		(substituted off) 45'
CM	24	(Ghana) Yakubu Abubakar
RM	9	(Myanmar) Kyaw Zayar Win		(substituted off) 74'
CF	27	(Japan) Nishihara Takumu
CF	30	(Nigeria) Christopher Chizoba
Substitutes:
GK	18	(Myanmar) Tun Lin Soe
DF	20	(Myanmar) Phyo Ko Ko Thein		(substituted on) 58'
MF	4	(Myanmar) Naing Lin Oo
MF	7	(Myanmar) Min Min Thu		(substituted on) 74'
MF	19	(Myanmar) Aung Kyaw Naing		(substituted on) 45'
MF	21	(Myanmar) Naing Lin Tun
FW	23	(Myanmar) Aung Ye Htut		(substituted on) 74'
Manager:
(Myanmar) U Kyaw Lwin

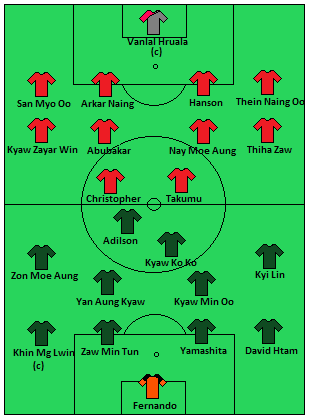

GK	1	(Brazil) Luiz Fernando
RB	4	(Myanmar) David Htan	(yellow card) 86'
CB	3	(Myanmar) Zaw Min Tun
CB	5	(Japan) Kunihiro Yamashita	(yellow card) 20'
LB	17	(Myanmar) Khin Maung Lwin (c)
CM	6	(Myanmar) Kyaw Min Oo		(substituted off) 68'
CM	25	(Myanmar) Yan Aung Kyaw	(yellow card) 67'
RW	10	(Myanmar) Kyi Lin
LW	21	(Myanmar) Zon Moe Aung		(substituted off) 76'
CF	7	(Myanmar) Kyaw Ko Ko		(substituted off) 87'
CF	20	(Brazil) Adilson
Substitutes:
GK	33	(Myanmar) Wai Lin Aung
DF	2	(Myanmar) Zarni Htet
DF	13	(Myanmar) Thein Zaw
MF	15	(Myanmar) Swan Htet Aung		(substituted on) 68'
MF	23	(Myanmar) Pyae Phyo Aung
FW	14	(Myanmar) Aung Kyaw Htwe		(substituted on) 76'
FW	9	(Myanmar) Than Paing		(substituted on) 87'
Manager:
(Brazil) Emerson Alcântara

Man of the match

- (Myanmar) Kyi Lin (Yangon United)

Match officials

- Assistant referees:
  - (Myanmar) U Chit Moe Aye
  - (Myanmar) U Hein Min Thu
- Fourth official: (Myanmar) U Zaw Khine
- Reserve official: (Myanmar) U Hla Myint Latt
- Match Commissioner: (Myanmar) U Nyi Nyi Latt

Match rules

- 90 minutes.
- Penalty shoot-out if scores still level.
- Seven named substitutes.
- Maximum of five substitutions.

=== Statistics ===
Statistic	Ayeyawady United	Yangon United
Goals scored	0	1
Possession	35%	65%
Shots on target	3	7
Shots off target	7	5
Corner kicks	6	11
Fouls	11	6
Offsides	3	0
Yellow cards	1	3
Red cards	0	0

== See also ==
- MNL
- Ayeyawady United
- MFF
