= 2020 MFF Charity Cup =

Shan United	Yangon United
2	1
- Date: 5 January 2020
- Venue: Yangon United Sports Complex, Yangon
- Man of the Match: (Myanmar) Ye Min Thu
- Referee: Mr. Kyaw Zwal Lwin
- Attendance: 15.000
- Weather: Sunny; 27 °C (81 °F)

The 2020 MFF Charity Cup (also known as the 2020 MPT Charity Cup for sponsorship reasons) is the 9th Charity Cup, an annual football match played between the winners of the previous National League and Domestic Cup competitions. It was held at YUSC Stadium on 5 January 2020. The match was played between Shan United, champions of the 2019 Myanmar National League and Yangon United, champions of the 2019 General Aung San Shield.

This was Yangon United's 6th Cup appearance and Shan United's 4th time Cup appearance, they won Charity Cup for the first time as Kanbawza FC in 2016.

== Match ==
=== Details ===
5 January 2020
16:00 MST

Shan United	2-1	Yangon United
Keith 57'; Ye Min Thu 74'	Report	Yan Pai Soe 75'

Y.U.S.C Stadium, Yangon
Attendance: 15.000
Referee: (Myanmar) Mr. Kyaw Zwal Lwin

Shan United	Yangon United

GK	1	(Myanmar) Thiha Sithu (c)
RB	4	(Myanmar) David Htan
CB	3	(Myanmar) Ye Min Thu	74'
CB	2	(Myanmar) Nyein Chan
LB	5	(Myanmar) Hein Thiha Zaw
CM	10	(Ivory Coast) Maximum	(yellow card) 31'
CM	80	(Ghana) Yakubu Abubakar
LW	60	(Myanmar) Zar Nay Ya Thu		(substituted off) 45'
RW	16	(Myanmar) Zwe Thet Paing		(substituted off) 51'
LW	8	(Myanmar) Zin Min Tun		(substituted off) 71'
CF	7	(Liberia) Keith Martu Nah	57'
Substitutes:
GK	13	(Myanmar) Myo Min Latt
DF	6	(Myanmar) Nanda Kyaw		(substituted on) 51'
MF	14	(Myanmar) Set Phyo Wai
DF	12	(Kyrgyzstan) Daniel Tagoe
FW	22	(Myanmar) Sa Aung Pyae Ko	(yellow card) 90+2'	(substituted on) 71' (substituted off) 90+2'
DF	23	(Myanmar) Hein Phyo Win
DF	32	(Myanmar) Tluanghup Thang
MF	70	(Myanmar) Yan Naing Oo		(substituted on) 45'
FW	77	(Myanmar) Dway Ko Ko Chit		(substituted on) 90+2'
Manager:
(Myanmar) Mr. Aung Khaing

GK	1	(Myanmar) Kyaw Zin Htet (c)
RB	17	(Myanmar) Zarni Htet
CB	32	(Burkina Faso) Ernest Aboubacar Congo
CB	30	(Myanmar) Thurain Soe
LB	22	(Myanmar) Min Kyaw Khant		(substituted off) 80'
CM	6	(Myanmar) Maung Maung Win		(substituted off) 76'
RW	8	(Myanmar) Soe Min Naing		(substituted off) 58'
LW	19	(Myanmar) Aung Kyaw Naing		(substituted off) 62'
AM	11	(Myanmar) Maung Maung Lwin
CF	88	(Nigeria) Emmanuel Uzochukwu		(substituted off) 73'
CF	44	(Ghana) Ernest Barfo
Substitutes:
GK	33	(Myanmar) Sann Satt Naing
DF	4	(Myanmar) Htike Htike Aung
MF	5	(Myanmar) Thein Than Win	(yellow card) 87'	(substituted on) 80'
MF	7	(Myanmar) Nyein Chan Aung
FW	9	(Myanmar) Than Paing		(substituted on) 62'
MF	19	(Myanmar) Kyaw Zin Oo		(substituted on) 58'
DF	23	(Myanmar) Yan Pai Soe	75'	(substituted on) 73'
FW	25	(Myanmar) Yan Aung Kyaw
DF	40	(Japan) Shori Murata		(substituted on) 76'
Manager:
(Myanmar) Mr. Tin Maung Tun

Man of the match

- (Myanmar) Ye Min Thu

Match officials

- Assistant referees:
  - (Myanmar) Mr. Chit Moe Aye
  - (Myanmar) Mr. Zayar Maung
- Fourth official: (Myanmar) Mr. Tin Moe Tun
- Reserve official: (Myanmar)
- Match Commissioner: (Myanmar) Mr. Tun Tun Aung

Match rules

- 90 minutes.
- Penalty shoot-out if scores still level.
- Nine named substitutes.
- Maximum of five substitutions.

=== Statistics ===
Statistic	Shan United	Yangon United
Goals scored	2	1
Possession	46%	54%
Shots on target	4	4
Shots off target	4	8
Corner kicks	2	10
Fouls	9	9
Offsides	0	1
Yellow cards	2	1
Red cards	0	0
