= Set Phyo Wai =

Burmese footballer

Personal information
- Full name: Set Phyo Wai
- Date of birth: 1 December 1994 (age 31)
- Place of birth: Yangon, Myanmar
- Height: 1.65 m (5 ft 5 in)
- Position: Midfielder

Team information
- Current team: Shan United
- Number: 14

Youth career
  - 2012: Yangon United Youth

Senior career*
Years	Team	Apps	(Gls)
2012 – 2014	Yangon United		
2014–2018	Magwe	53	(6)
2019–	Shan United	0	(0)

International career^{‡}
2015 – Present	Myanmar U-23	0	(0)
- * Club domestic league appearances and goals as of 1 December 2018 ‡ National team caps and goals as of August 27, 2014

Set Phyo Wai (Burmese: ဆက်ဖြိုးဝေ; born 1 December 1994) is a footballer from Burma, and a midfielder for the Myanmar U-23 football team and Yangon United FC. In 2014, Set Phyo Wai transferred to Magwe. Currently he plays main role at Shan United.

== Honor ==
2016 General Aung San Shield Champion
2017 MNL Champions
2018 MFF Charity Cup Champions
2019 MNL Champions
2020 MFF Charity Cup Champions
