= David Htan =

Burmese footballer (born 1990)

Personal information
- Full name: David Thang
- Date of birth: 13 May 1990 (age 36)
- Place of birth: Chin State, Myanmar
- Height: 1.65 m (5 ft 5 in)
- Position: Right-back

Team information
- Current team: Yangon United
- Number: 4

Senior career*
Years	Team	Apps	(Gls)
2009–2018	Yangon United	264	(3)
2018–2020	Shan United	49	(3)
2022–	Yangon United	31	(9)

International career
2011–	Myanmar	77	(4)
- * Club domestic league appearances and goals

David Htan (Burmese: ဒေးဗစ်ထန်; born 13 May 1990) is a Burmese professional footballer who plays as a right-back for Myanmar National League club Yangon United and the Myanmar national team.

He is currently holding the record for the highest number of Myanmar National League appearances in history with 336 appearances.

== Style of play ==
Despite lacking in height, he has a good positional sense and an ability to cleanly win one-on-one challenges.

== Club career ==
David played for Yangon United from 2009 to 2018 before joining Shan United and then returning to Yangon in 2022.

== International career ==
David made his Myanmar national team debut on 29 June 2011 during the 2014 FIFA World Cup qualifiers against Mongolia. On 11 September 2012, he scored his first international goal equalising the match to 1–1 against Singapore.

On 26 November 2016, David scored the only goal in the match as Myanmar beat Malaysia 1–0 in the 2016 AFF Championship.

David has participated in the 2014 AFC Challenge Cup, 2016 AFF Championship, 2018 AFF Championship, 2020 AFF Championship and the 2022 AFF Championship for Myanmar. He has also played in four FIFA World Cup qualification match.

== International statistics ==
As of match played 30 December 2022

Appearances and goals by national team and year
National team	Year	Apps	Goals
Myanmar	2011	4	0
Myanmar	2012	8	1
Myanmar	2013	3	0
Myanmar	2014	11	0
Myanmar	2015	7	1
Myanmar	2016	10	1
Myanmar	2017	7	0
Myanmar	2018	7	0
Myanmar	2019	5	1
Myanmar	2020	0	0
Myanmar	2021	8	0
Myanmar	2022	7	0
Total		77	4

=== International goals ===
Scores and results list Myanmar's goal tally first.

No.	Date	Venue	Opponent	Score	Result	Competition
1.	11 September 2012	Thuwunna Stadium, Yangon	Singapore	1–1	1–1	Friendly
2.	30 March 2015	Gelora Delta Stadium, Sidoarjo	Indonesia	1–2	1–2	Friendly
3.	26 November 2016	Thuwunna Stadium, Yangon	Malaysia	1–0	1–0	2016 AFF Championship
4.	7 November 2019	Mandalarthiri Stadium, Mandalay	Nepal	2–0	3–0	Friendly

== Honours ==
Yangon United

- Myanmar National League: 2011, 2012, 2013, 2015, 2018
- MFF Charity Cup: 2013, 2016, 2018
- General Aung San Shield: 2011, 2018

Shan United

- Myanmar National League: 2017, 2019, 2020
- MFF Charity Cup: 2019, 2020

Individual

- Myanmar National League Player of the Year: 2019
