= MFF Charity Cup =

- Founded: 2012
- Region: Myanmar
- Teams: 2
- Current champions: Shan United
- Most championships: Shan United (4th title)
- Website: MFF
- 2026

The MFF Charity Cup is Myanmar football's annual match contested between the champions of the previous Myanmar National League season and the holders of the General Aung San Shield at Aung San Stadium. If the Myanmar National League champions also won the General Aung San Shield then the league runners-up provide the opposition.

Organised by the Myanmar Football Federation, proceeds from the game are distributed to community-based initiatives and charities around the country. Revenue from the gate receipts. The fixture was first played in the 2012 season, replacing the MFF Opening Cup.

== Rules ==
The rules of the Charity Cup are generally the same as those for Myanmar League, with a team of 11 starting players and 7 substitutes. However, unlike in most other competitions where only three substitutions are permitted, teams in the Charity Cup are permitted up to six substitutions. If the scores are level after 90 minutes, the teams play a penalty shootout.

== Status ==
An official honour in the Myanmar game, the Charity Cup is the first competitive game of the new top-flight Myanmar football season. However, it has been considered by some to be a minor trophy and Charity Cup games may not be as hotly contested as other trophy finals. The tournament, along with other domestic super cups.

== Records ==
- The most successful teams in the competition are Yangon United and Shan United (3 outright win) and Magwe (1 outright win) and Ayeyawady United (2 outright win)
- The highest scoring game was Magwe's 3– win against Yadanarbon in 2017.

== Match ==
Year	Club	Score	Club
2012	Ayeyawady United	7–5 (pen)	Yangon United
2013	Yangon United	1–0	Ayeyawady United
2014	Kanbawza	2–0	Yangon United
2015	Ayeyawady United	1–0	Yadanarbon
2016	Yangon United	1–0	Ayeyawady United
2017	Magwe	3–0	Yadanarbon
2018	Yangon United	2–2 (4–2 p.)	Shan United
2019	Shan United	1–1 (4–3 p.)	Yangon United
2020	Shan United	2–1	Yangon United
2026	Shan United	1-0	Yangon United
