= Zwe Thet Paing =

Burmese footballer

Personal information
- Full name: Zwe Thet Paing
- Date of birth: 28 November 1998 (age 27)
- Place of birth: Yangon, Myanmar
- Height: 1.70 m (5 ft 7 in)
- Position: Midfielder

Youth career
- 2017: Shan United Youth

Senior career*
Years	Team	Apps	(Gls)
2019–2022	Shan United		
2022–2023	Yangon United		

International career^{‡}
2019-	Myanmar U-23	0	(0)
- * Club domestic league appearances and goals as of 12 Feb 2020 ‡ National team caps and goals as of August 27, 2014

Zwe Thet Paing (Burmese: ဇွဲသက်ပိုင်; also known as Zwe Paing, born 28 November 1998) is a footballer from Burma, and a midfielder.

In 2019, Zwe Thet Paing was signed to Shan United senior team and named in the Myanmar national U-23 team to compete in the 2019 SEA Games. In 2022, he was signed to Yangon United F.C.

== Honor ==
2019 MNL Champions
2020 MFF Charity Cup Champions
