= Han Win Aung =

Burmese footballer

Personal information
- Full name: Han Win Aung
- Date of birth: 17 December 1984 (age 41)
- Height: 1.61 m (5 ft 3 1/2 in)
- Position: Defender

Senior career*
Years	Team	Apps	(Gls)
2004–2013	Kanbawza		

International career^{‡}
2008–2011	Myanmar	14	(0)

Managerial career
- 2010 – 2021: Kanbawza (assistant)
- 2021 – 2023: Shan United
- 2025 –: Shan United
- * Club domestic league appearances and goals ‡ National team caps and goals as of 21 November 2012

Han Win Aung (Burmese: ဟန်ဝင်းအောင်; born 17 December 1986) is a footballer from Burma and a defender for the Myanmar national football team. He is currently the head coach of Myanmar National League club Shan United.

== Managerial career ==
After retiring in 2013, Han transitioned into the Kanbawza (now known as Shan United) as the club assistant head coach. After the club head coach Aung Naing wa sacked in 2021, Han was promoted to the head coach role where he guided the club to win back-to-back league title in 2022 and 2023 becoming the most successful coach in the club history.

== Managerial statistics ==
As of match played 5 February 2026

Managerial record by team and tenure
Team	Nat.	From	To	Record					Ref.
Team	Nat.	From	To	G	W	D	L	Win %	Ref.
Shan United	(Myanmar)	11 January 2021	31 December 2023	44	33	7	4	75.00	
Shan United	(Myanmar)	6 November 2025	Present	13	7	2	4	53.85	
Career Total				57	40	9	8	70.18	

== Honours ==
- Myanmar National League: 2022, 2023
