= P. N. Sivaji =

Singaporean football manager

Personal information
- Full name: Poravankara Narayanan Nair Sivaji
- Date of birth: 16 October 1951 (age 75)
- Place of birth: Singapore

Managerial career
- Years: Team
- 1992–1993: Singapore
- 1996: Tanjong Pagar United
- 1997–2001: Balestier Central
- 2002–2003: Singapore (assistant)
- 2003: Young Lions
- 2003: Singapore (caretaker)
- 2008–2009: Home United
- 2010–2011: Hanthawaddy United
- 2012–2013: Kanbawza
- 2020–2021: Brunei (technical director)

Poravankara Narayanan Nair Sivaji is a Singaporean football manager and former player.

== Managerial career ==
In 1992, Sivaji was appointed the head coach of the Singapore national team.

In 1996, he was appointed manager of Singaporean side Tanjong Pagar United.

In November 1997, Sivaji was recruited by Balestier Central as the club head coach.

In 2004, he was appointed manager technical director of Singapore. In 2008, Sivaji was appointed manager of Lion City Sailors in Singapore.

In 2010, he was appointed manager of Burmese club Hanthawaddy United, helping them win the 2010 General Aung San Shield, their only major trophy. In 2020, he was appointed technical director of Brunei.
