= Htet Phyo Wai =

Burmese footballer

Personal information
- Full name: Htet Phyo Wai
- Date of birth: 21 January 2000 (age 26)
- Place of birth: Shwebo, Sagaing Division, Myanmar
- Height: 1.70 m (5 ft 7 in)
- Position: Winger

Team information
- Current team: Dagon Star United
- Number: 72

Youth career
- 2017 – 2018: Shan United Youth team

Senior career*
Years	Team	Apps	(Gls)
2019–2020	Shan United	22	(6)
2022–2023	Yangon United	12	(4)
2023–	Shan United	11	(0)

International career^{‡}
2017–2023	Myanmar U-23	17	(5)
2018–	Myanmar	23	(3)
- * Club domestic league appearances and goals as of 3 October 2023 ‡ National team caps and goals as of 12 Oct 2023

Htet Phyo Wai (Burmese: ထက်ဖြိုး‌‌ေ၀; born 21 January 2000) is a Burmese professional footballer who plays as a winger. He scored his first international goal for Myanmar against Laos in 2018 AFF Championship.

Htet Phyo Wai scored two more goals for Myanmar in the 2020 AFF Championship against the Philippines. He also signed for Yangon United and has already scored two goals.

== Career ==
Shan United registered Htet Phyo Wai for both Shan United senior team and U21 team.

== Club statistics ==
Appearances and goals by club team and year
Club team	Year	Apps	Goals	Assists
Shan United	2019	11	2	0
Shan United	2020	11	4	2
Yangon United	2022	12	4	3
Shan United	2023	13	0	3
Total		47	10	8

=== International goals ===
Scores and results list Myanmar's goal tally first.

No	Date	Venue	Opponent	Score	Result	Competition
1.	16 November 2018	New Laos National Stadium, Vientiane, Laos	Laos	2–1	3–1	2018 AFF Championship
2.	18 December 2021	Bishan Stadium, Bishan, Singapore	Philippines	1–3	2–3	2020 AFF Championship
3.	18 December 2021	Bishan Stadium, Bishan, Singapore	Philippines	2–3	2–3	2020 AFF Championship

== Honours ==
=== Club ===
Shan United

- Myanmar National League
  - Winners (1): 2019
  - Runners-up (1): 2018
- General Aung San Shield
  - Champions (1): 2017
  - Runners-up (1): 2019
