= Valci Júnior =

Brazilian footballer

Personal information
- Full name: Valci Teixeira Júnior
- Date of birth: 14 February 1987 (age 39)
- Place of birth: Brasília, DF, Brazil
- Height: 1.90 m (6 ft 3 in)
- Position: Striker

Youth career
- Mogi Mirim SP
- União São João Araras

Senior career*
Years	Team	Apps	(Gls)
2007–2008	Gama	26	(12)
2009	TOT-CAT	12	(3)
2010	Sisaket	11	(5)
2010	TTM Phichit	8	(4)
2011	Thai Port	18	(7)
2011	Nakhon Ratchasima	14	(8)
2012	Al Nahda Club	22	(15)
2013	Rayong United	15	(8)
2013	Krabi	14	(9)
2014	Bangkok	26	(16)
2015	Ayutthaya	33	(24)
2016	Gainare Tottori	15	(11)
2017	Udon Thani	24	(14)
2018	Samut Sakhon	15	(8)
2018	Phnom Penh Crown	11	(13)
2019–2020	Perlis	0	(0)
2020	Punjab	6	(0)
2020	Sisaket	8	(0)
2021–2022	Chainat United	1	(0)
2022	Yangon United	9	(8)
2024	Lopburi City	1	(0)
- * Club domestic league appearances and goals as of September 18, 2021 ‡ National team caps and goals as of September 18, 2022

Valci Teixeira Júnior, more commonly known as Valci Júnior, is a Brazilian football (soccer) player who plays as a striker. He scored on his Yangon United debut against GFA within the first twelve minutes, and remains as the only foreign signing for Yangon United in the 2022 window.
