= Myo Ko Tun =

Burmese footballer

Personal information
- Full name: Myo Ko Tun
- Date of birth: 9 March 1995 (age 31)
- Place of birth: Pakokku, Myanmar
- Height: 1.68 m (5 ft 6 in)
- Position: Midfielder

Team information
- Current team: Shan United
- Number: 23

Youth career
- 2011–2013: Mandalay Football Academy

Senior career*
Years	Team	Apps	(Gls)
2013–2022	Yadanarbon FC	106	(9)
2023–	Shan United	16	(0)

International career^{‡}
2013–2015	Myanmar U-20	19	(2)
2016–	Myanmar	23	(0)
- * Club domestic league appearances and goals as of 22 October 2023 ‡ National team caps and goals as of 14 November 2019

Myo Ko Tun (Burmese: မျိုးကိုထွန်း; born 9 March 1995) is a Burmese professional footballer who plays as a midfielder for Yadanarbon FC and Myanmar national team. He had played in U-19 national football team.

== Early life ==
Myo Ko Tun is born on 9 March 1995 in Pakokku, Magway Division. In 2009, he joined the Myanmar Football Academy in Mandalay.

== Career ==
=== Yadanarbon FC ===
Myo Ko Tun has played for Yadanarbon FC since 2015. He was runner-up with the club in 2015 and celebrated the Myanmar soccer championship in 2016.

=== Shan United FC ===
Beginning of the 2023, Myo Ko Tun completely moved to Shan United from his Yadanarbon.

=== National team ===
Myo Ko Tun debuted in U-19 national football team in 2016. He made his national team debut on 29 March 2016 in a World Cup qualifier against Lebanon. Here he was in the starting lineup and was replaced by Kyaw Zin Lwin in the 79th minute.

== Club ==
- Yadanabon FC(1): 2014 (MNL) :2016(MNL)

== Awards ==
- Hassanal Bolkiah Trophy (1): 2014
