= Ye Min Thu =

Burmese footballer

Personal information
- Full name: Ye Min Thu
- Date of birth: 18 February 1998 (age 28)
- Place of birth: Yangon, Myanmar
- Height: 1.74 m (5 ft 8 1/2 in)
- Position: Centre back

Team information
- Current team: Shan United
- Number: 3

Youth career
- 2015–18: Shan United U-21

Senior career*
Years	Team	Apps	(Gls)
2017–	Shan United	121	(6)

International career^{‡}
2018–2022	Myanmar U22	3	(0)
2021–	Myanmar	27	(0)
- * Club domestic league appearances and goals as of 24 october 2023 ‡ National team caps and goals as of 21 November 2023

Ye Min Thu (Burmese: ရဲမင္းသူ; born 18 February 1998) is a Burmese footballer who plays as a centre back for Myanmar U23 and plays club football with Shan United.

== Honours ==
National Team

- Tri-Nation Series (India)

- Runners-up (1):2023

=== Club ===
Shan United

- Myanmar National League
  - Winners (4): 2017, 2019, 2020, 2022
  - Runners-up (1): 2018
- General Aung San Shield
  - Champions (1): 2017
  - Runners-up (1): 2019

== International ==
As of match played 21 November 2023

Appearances and goals by national team and year
National team	Year	Apps	Goals
Myanmar	2021	9	0
Myanmar	2022	11	0
Myanmar	2023	8	0
Total		28	0
