= Nanda Kyaw =

Burmese footballer (born 1996)

Personal information
- Full name: Nanda Kyaw
- Date of birth: 3 September 1996 (age 30)
- Place of birth: Amarapura, Myanmar
- Height: 1.72 m (5 ft 7 1/2 in)
- Position: Left-back

Team information
- Current team: Shan United
- Number: 5

Youth career
- 2007–2011: Mandalay Institute of Sports
- 2012–2013: Magway

Senior career*
Years	Team	Apps	(Gls)
2013–2018	Magwe	127	(9)
2019–	Shan United	155	(25)

International career^{‡}
2014–2015	Myanmar U-19	15	(1)
2014–2019	Myanmar U-22	3	(0)
2015–2026	Myanmar	75	(1)
- * Club domestic league appearances and goals as of 28 July 2026 ‡ National team caps and goals as of 28 July 2026

Nanda Kyaw (Burmese: နန္ဒကျော်; born 3 September 1996) is a Burmese professional footballer who plays as a left-back for Shan United and the Myanmar national team. He is the former captain of the Myanmar U-20 national team and played in the 2015 FIFA U-20 World Cup. Nanda Kyaw won first runner-up of the 2013 MNL Youth League's Best Player Award.

== Club career ==
=== Magwe ===
Kyaw was born in Amarapura Township, Manadalay State. He played football since he was 10. In 2012, he reached to Magway Youth Club.

=== Shan United ===
In 2019 season, Nanda Kyaw leaved his childhood club Magwe and moved to Shan United as a free agent. His transfer to the Thai league was canceled due to his injury and passport error.

== National team ==
He was selected for the Myanmar national football team after the 2015 FIFA U-20 World Cup. He became the national team captain following the retirement of Maung Maung Lwin. In August 2026, he announced his retirement from the Myanmar national football team, marking the end of his long journey with the national team.

== Career statistics ==
=== Club ===
Appearances and goals by club team and year
Club team	Year	Apps	Goals	Assists
Magwe F.C.	2013	18	1	0
Magwe F.C.	2014	20	2	0
Magwe F.C.	2015	22	1	0
Magwe F.C.	2016	21	1	0
Magwe F.C.	2017	26	1	2
Magwe F.C.	2018	20	3	0
Shan United	2019	27	2	5
Shan United	2020	26	6	3
Shan United	2022	26	7	4
Shan United	2023	21	9	6
Shan United	2024	31	1	1
Shan United	2025	24	1	1
Total		282	35	22

=== International ===
As of match played 19 July 2026

Appearances and goals by national team and year
National team	Year	Apps	Goals
Myanmar	2015	4	0
Myanmar	2016	8	0
Myanmar	2017	4	0
Myanmar	2018	7	0
Myanmar	2019	6	0
Myanmar	2020	0	0
Myanmar	2021	5	0
Myanmar	2022	7	0
Myanmar	2023	8	0
Myanmar	2024	15	0
Myanmar	2025	5	1
Myanmar	2026	6	0
Total		75	1

List of international goals scored by Nanda Kyaw
No.	Date	Venue	Opponent	Score	Result	Competition
1.	9 October 2025	Prince Abdullah bin Jalawi Stadium, Hofuf, Saudi Arabia	Syria	1–5	1–5	2027 AFC Asian Cup qualification

== Honours ==
Magwe

- General Aung San Shield: 2016

Shan United

- Myanmar National League: 2019, 2020, 2022 , 2023 , 2024 , 2025-26
- General Aung San Shield: 2017, 2020; runners-up: 2019

Myanmar U20

- Hassanal Bolkiah Trophy: 2014

Myanmar

- Tri-Nation Series of India: runner-up: 2023
