= Shan United F.C. =

Association football club in Myanmar

Shan United ရှမ်းယူနိုက်တက် အသင်း
- Full name: Shan United Football Club
- Nickname: တောင်ပေါ်သား (Hillside Man)
- Short name: SHU
- Founded: 2003; 23 years ago, as Kanbawza; 2015; 11 years ago, as Shan United
- Ground: Taunggyi Stadium
- Capacity: 7,000
- Owner: Kun Naung Myint Wai
- Chairman: Ye Myo Tun
- Head coach: Aung Khine
- League: Myanmar National League
- 2025–26: MNL, 1st of 12 (champions)
- Website: www.shanunited.com
Home colours	Away colours	Third colours

Shan United Football Club (Burmese: ရှမ်းယူနိုက်တက် အသင်း, pronounced [ʃán]) is a professional football club based in Taunggyi, Myanmar, representing the Shan State in the M League, the top flight league of Myanmar football. It had previously competed as an amateur club under the name Kanbawza.

The club had won 7 league titles, 3 Myanmar National League Cup and 4 MFF Charity Cup in their history. Shan United also manage to dominate the league winning the league title for 6 consecutive row.

== History ==
=== As Kanbawza (2003–2015) ===
Kanbawza was founded in 2003, played as an amateur club in the Myanmar Premier League, the highest football league in Myanmar at the time. The club won the 2007 Myanmar Premier League title and participated in the AFC President's Cup 2008. Kanbawza was a founding member of the Myanmar National League, which succeeded the Myanmar Premier League in 2009. In the process, the club changed its status from amateur to professional, and changed its home base from Yangon to Taunggyi. In its first-ever professional match, Kanbawza won by 3 goals over Okktha United. Kanbawza finished fourth in the league's inaugural cup competition, the Myanmar National League Cup 2009. In February 2010, Khin Maung Kyaing took control as the club chief executive officer. In 2012, it finished the league as runners-up.

In 2013, Kanbawza won their first major honours after Singaporean head coach, P. N. Sivaji guided them to win the 2013 Myanmar National League Cup after a 1–0 win over Magwe in the final.

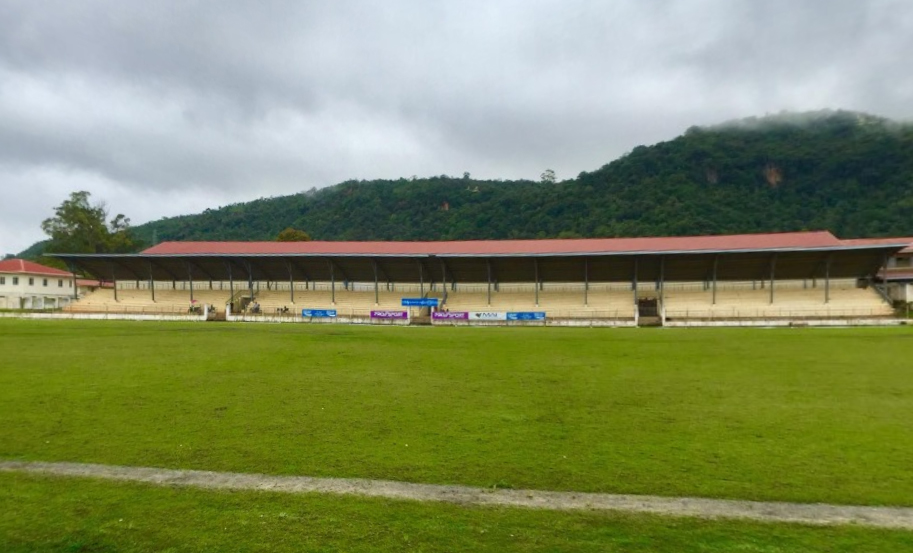
Taunggyi Stadium has been the home ground of Shan United since 2012.

=== As Shan United (2015–present) ===
In 2015, Kanbawza changed its name to Shan United. The club went on to win their first professional piece of silverware, winning both the 2017 Myanmar National League title and the 2017 General Aung San Shield, thus qualifying for the 2018 AFC Champions League qualifying play-offs. They played against Ceres–Negros of Philippines but lost and bowed down to the 2018 AFC Cup group stage, finishing last. However, the club managed to get their first win in the 2018 edition winning 2–1 against Cambodian club Boeung Ket Angkor. Shan United went on to become back to back league champions in 2019 and 2020, winning the 2019 and 2020 MFF Charity Cup. Shan United went on to win the 2022 Myanmar National League undefeated, qualifying to the 2023–24 AFC Cup.

In 2024, Shan United qualified to the inaugural 2024–25 AFC Challenge League and also the revived 2024–25 ASEAN Club Championship. They won over Bruneian club Kasuka 4–2 on aggregate to qualify for the group stage, being placed alongside Indonesian PSM Makassar, Vietnamese Đông Á Thanh Hóa, Malaysian Terengganu, Cambodian Preah Khan Reach Svay Rieng and Thailand BG Pathum United. Shan United and Đông Á Thanh Hóa played the opening match of the tournament at the Thanh Hóa Stadium. Moussa Bakayoko scored the first goal of the tournament in the fifth minute, however Shan United went on to lose 3–1 against the Vietnamese side. Shan United then hosted the AFC Challenge League group D with Taiwanese Tainan City and Laotian Young Elephants. Shan United managed to top the group, beating Young Elephants 2–0 and drawing 2–2 with Tainan City. In the quarter-finals they faced Cambodian side Preah Khan Reach Svay Rieng. Shan United went on to retain their third consecutive league title after winning the 2024–25 Myanmar National League. The club qualified to the 2025–26 AFC Challenge League group stage and the 2025–26 ASEAN Club Championship play-off.

== Kit suppliers and shirt sponsors ==
Year	Kit manufacturer	Main sponsors
2017–2023	(Myanmar) Pro Sport	(Myanmar) Kanbawza Bank
2024–2025	(Myanmar) Foxx	(Cyprus) 1xBet
2025– 2026	(Myanmar) Foxx	(Philippines) SBOTOP
2026–present	(Myanmar) M21	(Myanmar) Alpine

== Players ==
=== First-team squad ===
As of August 2026

Note: Flags indicate national team as defined under FIFA eligibility rules; some limited exceptions apply. Players may hold more than one non-FIFA nationality.

No.	Pos.	Nation	Player
1	GK	MYA	Pyae Phyo Thu
3	DF	MYA	Ye Min Thu
4	MF	GHA	Stephen Owusu
5	DF	MYA	Hein Thiha Zaw (captain)
6	DF	MYA	Nanda Kyaw (vice-captain)
7	MF	MYA	Lwin Moe Aung
9	FW	BRA	Carlos Damian
10	FW	MYA	Sa Aung Pyae Ko
11	MF	MYA	Ye Yint Aung
12	FW	MYA	Peter Aunng Wai Htoo
13	GK	MYA	Sai Thiha Naing
14	MF	MYA	Soe Min Oo
15	DF	MYA	Aung Wunna Soe
16	MF	MYA	Lin Htet Soe
17	DF	MYA	Naung Naung Soe
18	GK	MYA	Kyaw Zin Phyo
19	MF	MYA	Thet Wai Moe

No.	Pos.	Nation	Player
20	MF	MYA	Kaung Myat Kyaw
21	MF	RUS	Daniel Tokaren
22	DF	MYA	Phyo Pyae Sone
23	MF	MYA	Myo Ko Tun
24	FW	MYA	Zwe Man Thar
25	MF	MYA	Nyein Chan Aung
27	MF	GHA	Mark Sekyi
28	DF	GHA	Everett Boateng
29	DF	MYA	Kaung Min Htut
30	GK	MYA	Pyae Phyo Aung
33	MF	MYA	Kyaw Min Oo
44	DF	MYA	Thet Hein Soe
66	FW	MYA	Thu Rein Tun
77	DF	FRA	Rodrigue Nanitelamio
88	FW	MYA	Aung Kyaw Naing
99	FW	BRA	Edson Dos Santos

== Management and staff ==
Position	Name
Head coach	(Myanmar) Aung Khine
Assistant coach	(Myanmar) Kyaw Thiha (Myanmar) Aung Kyaw Tun
Goalkeeper coach	(Myanmar) Ya Wai Zin
Fitness coach	(Spain) Ferran Fernandez
Physiotherapist	(Myanmar) Myo Tun
Head of media	(Myanmar) Ye Min Aung

== Honours ==
Type	Competition	Titles	Seasons
League	M League	7	2017, 2019, 2020, 2022, 2023, 2024–25, 2025–26
Cup	Myanmar National League Cup	3	2013, 2017, 2024
Cup	MFF Charity Cup	4	2014, 2019, 2020, 2026

Bold is for those competition that are currently active.

== Records and statistics ==
As of 12 October 2026

Top 10 all-time appearances
Rank	Player	Years	Club appearances
1	(Myanmar) Nanda Kyaw	2019–present	155
2	(Myanmar) Hein Thiha Zaw	2015–present	124
3	(Myanmar) Ye Min Thu	2017–present	121
4	(Myanmar) Yan Naing Oo	2016–2020	110
5	(Myanmar) Hein Phyo Win	2018–2022, 2024–2026	90
6	(Ghana) Mark Sekyi	2022–present	88
7	(Myanmar) Ye Yint Aung	2023–present	85
8	(Myanmar) Kyaw Zin Phyo	2022–present	78
9	(Myanmar) Zwe Khant Min	2022–2026	73
10	(Myanmar) Zwe Htet Min	2022–2026	68

Top 10 all-time scorer
Rank	Player	Club appearances	Goals
1	(Myanmar) Soe Min Oo	246	109
2	(Nigeria) Charles Obi	35	27
3	(Nigeria) Christopher Chizoba	49	26
4	(Myanmar) Dway Ko Ko Chit	50	24
5	(Myanmar) Zin Min Tun	64	23
6	(Ghana) Mark Sekyi	88	22
7	(Myanmar) Nanda Kyaw	155	22
8	(Myanmar) Sa Aung Pyae Ko	63	21
9	(Ivory Coast) Moussa Bakayoko	33	17
10	(Myanmar) Myat Kaung Khant	65	16

- Biggest win: 11–0 vs (Bhutan) Transport United (27 April 2008)
- Heaviest defeats: 0–6 vs (Vietnam) Becamex Binh Duong (16 April 2019)
- Youngest Goal scorers: Htet Phyo Wai ~ 18 years 11 months 29 days old (On 19 January 2019 vs Yadanarbon)
- Oldest Goal scorers: (Brazil) Tércio ~ 34 years 4 months 10 days old (On 19 May 2012 vs (Singapore) Woodlands Wellington)
- Youngest ever debutant: Thet Paing Htoo ~ 18 years 9 months 28 days old (On 7 January 2019 vs Yangon United)
- Oldest ever player: (Brazil) Carlos Damian ~ 34 years 10 months 14 days old (On 14 September 2026 vs (Laos) Ezra)

== Notable players ==
=== International capped players ===
AFC/OFC.: (Japan) Yuki Aizu; (Kyrgyzstan) Daniel Tagoe; (Maldives) Mohamed Arif	CAF.: (Ghana) Yakubu Abubakar; (Liberia) Keith Nah; (Nigeria) Emmanuel Uzochukwu	UEFA.: (Republic of Ireland) Caleb Folan	CONMEBOL/ CONCACAF.: (Canada) Jordan Hamilton

== Managerial history ==
Name	Period	Achievements
As Kanbawza
(Singapore) P. N. Sivaji	May 2012 – December 2013	– 2013 Myanmar National League Cup
As Shan United
(Myanmar) Soe Myat Min	January 2014 – March 2018	– 2014 MFF Charity Cup – 2017 Myanmar National League – 2017 Myanmar National League Cup
(Myanmar) Aung Kyaw Tun (interim)	March – April 2018	
(North Macedonia) Marjan Sekulovski	April – September 2018	
(Myanmar) Min Thu	December 2018 – March 2019	– 2019 MFF Charity Cup
(Myanmar) Aung Naing	March 2019 – December 2020	– 2019 Myanmar National League – 2020 MFF Charity Cup – 2020 Myanmar National League
(Myanmar) Han Win Aung	January 2021 – December 2023	– 2022 Myanmar National League – 2023 Myanmar National League
(Myanmar) Myo Hlaing Win	January – August 2024	
(Japan) Hiroki Ono	September 2024 – November 2025	– 2024–25 Myanmar National League
(Myanmar) Han Win Aung	November 2025 – May 2026	– 2025–26 Myanmar National League
(Myanmar) Aung Khine	August 2026 – present	– 2026 MFF Charity Shield

== Season by season record ==
Season	League									MFF Cup	Top goalscorer		Coach
Season	Div.	Pos.	Pl.	W	D	L	GS	GA	P	MFF Cup	Name	Goals	Coach
2009	1st	4th	7	4	0	3	9	5	12				
2009–10	1st	3rd	14	7	3	4	25	18	24				
2010	1st	4th	20	11	5	4	28	11	38				
2011	1st	4th	22	9	6	7	27	21	33				
2012	1st	2nd	22	18	5	3	64	25	59	Runners-up	(Brazil) Nunez	16	
2013	1st	3rd	22	11	8	3	47	23	41	–	(Myanmar) Soe Min Oo	15	
2014	1st	3rd	22	12	4	6	37	27	40	Third round	(Croatia) Tihomir Živković	10	
2015	1st	5th	22	10	5	7	38	33	35	Second round	(Republic of Ireland) Caleb Folan	12	(Myanmar) Soe Myat Min
2016	1st	5th	22	9	9	4	32	13	36	Quarter-final	(Myanmar) Soe Min Oo	9	(Myanmar) Soe Myat Min
2017	1st	1	22	17	3	2	37	8	54	Winners	(Nigeria) Christopher Chizoba	15	(Myanmar) Soe Myat Min
2018	1st	2nd	22	15	5	2	33	13	50	Semi-final	(Myanmar) Dway Ko Ko Chit	11	(North Macedonia) Marjan Sekulovski
2019	1st	1	22	12	10	0	45	21	46	final	(Myanmar) Dway Ko Ko Chit	5	(Myanmar) Aung Naing
2020	1st	1	18	14	2	2	42	16	46		(Myanmar) Zin Min Tun	7	(Myanmar) Aung Naing
2022	1st	1	18	15	3	0	31	8	48		(Myanmar) Nanda Kyaw	7	(Myanmar) Han Win Aung
2023	1st	1	22	19	3	0	62	19	60		(Ivory Coast) Bello	13	(Myanmar) Han Win Aung
2024–25	1st	1	22	20	2	0	65	12	62		(Myanmar) Ye Yint Aung	6	(Japan) Hiroki Ono
2025–26	1st	1	22	18	4	0	66	10	58		(Myanmar) Sa Aung Pyae Ko	16	(Myanmar) Han Win Aung

== Performance in international competitions ==
Season	Competition	Round	Club	Home	Away	Aggregate
2008	AFC President's Cup	Group C	(Turkmenistan) Aşgabat	0–1		2nd
2008	AFC President's Cup	Group C	(Sri Lanka) Ratnam	2–3		2nd
2008	AFC President's Cup	Group C	(Bhutan) Transport United	11–0		2nd
2009	AFC President's Cup	Group C	(Cambodia) Phnom Penh Crown	4–3		2nd
2009	AFC President's Cup	Group C	(Bhutan) Yeedzin	2–4		2nd
2009	AFC President's Cup	Group C	(Kyrgyzstan) Dordoi-Dynamo Naryn	2–1		2nd
2018	AFC Champions League	Preliminary round 1	(Philippines) Ceres–Negros	1–1 (3–4 p)		
2018	AFC Cup	Group F	(Singapore) Home United	0–1	2–3	4th
2018	AFC Cup	Group F	(Cambodia) Boeung Ket Angkor	1–4	2–1	4th
2018	AFC Cup	Group F	(Philippines) Ceres–Negros	0–1	0–2	4th
2019	AFC Cup	Group G	(Philippines) Ceres–Negros	0–5	2–3	4th
2019	AFC Cup	Group G	(Indonesia) Persija Jakarta	1–3	1–6	4th
2019	AFC Cup	Group G	(Vietnam) Becamex Bình Dương	1–2	0–6	4th
2020	AFC Champions League	Preliminary round 1	(Philippines) Ceres–Negros	3–2		
2020	AFC Cup	Group H	(Philippines) Kaya–Iloilo	0–2	Cancelled	4th
2020	AFC Cup	Group H	(Indonesia) PSM Makassar	Cancelled	1–3	4th
2020	AFC Cup	Group H	(Singapore) Tampines Rovers	Cancelled	1–2	4th
2021	AFC Cup	Group stage	Withdrew			
2023–24	AFC Cup	Group H	(Australia) Macarthur	0–3	0–4	4th
2023–24	AFC Cup	Group H	(Philippines) DH Cebu	1–1	0–1	4th
2023–24	AFC Cup	Group H	(Cambodia) Phnom Penh Crown	2–1	0–4	4th
2024–25	AFC Challenge League	Group D	(Laos) Young Elephants	2–0		1st
2024–25	AFC Challenge League	Group D	(Chinese Taipei) Tainan City	2–2		1st
2024–25	AFC Challenge League	Quarter-finals	(Cambodia) Preah Khan Reach Svay Rieng	2–1	2–6	4–7
2024–25	ASEAN Club Championship	Qualifying play-off	(Brunei) Kasuka	3–1	1–1	4–2
2024–25	ASEAN Club Championship	Group A	(Vietnam) Đông Á Thanh Hóa	—N/a	1–3	6th
2024–25	ASEAN Club Championship	Group A	(Indonesia) PSM Makassar	—N/a	3–4	6th
2024–25	ASEAN Club Championship	Group A	(Malaysia) Terengganu	0–5	—N/a	6th
2024–25	ASEAN Club Championship	Group A	(Thailand) BG Pathum United	1–4	—N/a	6th
2024–25	ASEAN Club Championship	Group A	(Cambodia) Preah Khan Reach Svay Rieng	—N/a	2–4	6th
2025–26	AFC Challenge League	Group E	(Chinese Taipei) Tainan City	1–2		4th
2025–26	AFC Challenge League	Group E	(Cambodia) Phnom Penh Crown	1–3		4th
2025–26	AFC Challenge League	Group E	(Indonesia) Dewa United Banten	1–4		4th
2025–26	ASEAN Club Championship	Qualifying play-off	(Laos) Ezra	1–0	2–1	3–1
2025–26	ASEAN Club Championship	Group B	(Cambodia) Preah Khan Reach Svay Rieng	0–3	—N/a	6th
2025–26	ASEAN Club Championship	Group B	(Vietnam) Nam Định	0–3	—N/a	6th
2025–26	ASEAN Club Championship	Group B	(Singapore) Lion City Sailors	—N/a	2–3	6th
2025–26	ASEAN Club Championship	Group B	(Malaysia) Johor Darul Ta'zim	—N/a	0–3	6th
2025–26	ASEAN Club Championship	Group B	(Thailand) Bangkok United	—N/a	1–2	6th
2026–27	AFC Challenge League	Group E	(Chinese Taipei) Hang Yuan	1–1		2nd
2026–27	AFC Challenge League	Group E	(Brunei) Kasuka	2–0		2nd
2026–27	AFC Challenge League	Group E	(Philippines) Manila Digger	0–4		2nd
2026–27	AFC Challenge League	Quarter-finals	(Indonesia) Borneo			
2026–27	ASEAN Club Championship	Qualifying play-off	(Laos) Ezra	1–0 (a.e.t.)	2–3	3–3 (a.e.t.) (3–2 p)
2026–27	ASEAN Club Championship	Group B	(Indonesia) Persib	—N/a	0–6	
2026–27	ASEAN Club Championship	Group B	(Malaysia) Johor Darul Ta'zim	—N/a		
2026–27	ASEAN Club Championship	Group B	(Thailand) Port		—N/a	
2026–27	ASEAN Club Championship	Group B	(Vietnam) Công An Hà Nội	—N/a		
2026–27	ASEAN Club Championship	Group B	(Singapore) Lion City Sailors		—N/a	
2026–27	ASEAN Club Championship	Group B	(Cambodia) Preah Khan Reach Svay Rieng		—N/a	

== Continental record ==
Season	Competition	Round	Club	Home	Away	Aggregate
2012	Singapore Cup	Round of 16	(Singapore) Woodlands Wellington	2–1		

== See also ==
- Shan United W.F.C
