= 2019 Myanmar National League =

Myanmar National League
- Season: 2019
- Champions: Shan United
- Runner up: Ayeyawady United
- Relegated: Dagon; Chinland
- Matches: 132
- Goals: 389 (2.95 per match)
- Top goalscorer: Win Naing Soe (18 goals)
- Best goalkeeper: Ko Ko Naing; Kyaw Zin Htet; Kyaw Zin Phyo (7 clean sheets)
- Biggest home win: Sagaing United 6–0 Southern Myanmar (26 January 2019); Ayeyawady United 6–0 Sagaing United (15 September 2019)
- Biggest away win: Dagon 2–5 Shan United (26 January 2019)
- Highest scoring: Yadanarbon 6–2 Chinland (15 September 2019)
- Longest winning run: Yadanarbon F.C. (4 matches)
- Longest unbeaten run: Shan United (22 matches)
- Longest winless run: Chinland (9 matches)
- Longest losing run: Dagon (6 matches)
- Highest attendance: 34,755; Shan United 4–1 Rakhine United (15 September 2019)

The 2019 Myanmar National League is the 10th season of the Myanmar National League, the top Myanmar professional league for association football clubs, since its establishment in 2009, also known as MPT Myanmar National League due to the sponsorship deal with Myanma Posts and Telecommunications. A total of 12 teams will compete in the league. The season began on 12 January 2019 and is scheduled to conclude on 24 September 2019.

Yangon United are the defending champions, while Chinland and Dagon have entered as the promoted teams from the 2018 MNL-2.

The 1st transfer window is from 1 November 2018 to 12 January 2019 while the 2nd transfer window is from 1 June 2019 to 31 July 2019.

== Changes from last season ==
=== Team changes ===
==== Promoted Clubs ====
Promoted from the 2018 MNL-2

- Royal Thanlyin
- Dagon

==== Relegated Clubs ====
Relegated from the 2018 Myanmar National League

- Chinland
- Myawady

Royal Thanlyin decided not to play in 2019 MNL because of finance. After that, MNL allowed Chinland to play in 2019 MNL.

== 2019 Title Sponsor ==
Myanma Posts and Telecommunications signed 3 years contract with MNL. They help to develop Myanmar Football and Youth program.

2019 MNL Title Sponsor
- Type: mobile, voice and data
- Location: Myanmar
- Frequency: 450/800 MHz, 900/2100 MHz
- Established: 1884
- Current status: operational
- Website: www.mpt.com.mm

== Clubs ==
=== Stadiums ===
Locations of the 2019 Myanmar National League

Club	Home City	Stadium	Capacity
Ayeyawady United	Pathein	Ayar Stadium	6,000
Chinland	Chin	Hakha Stadium	10,000
Dagon			
Hantharwady United	Bago	Grand Royal Stadium	4,000
Magwe	Magway	Magway Stadium*	3,000
Rakhine United	Sittwe	Weithali Stadium	7,000
Sagaing United	Monywa	Monywa Stadium	4,000
Shan United	Taunggyi	Taunggyi Stadium	7,000
Southern Myanmar	Mawlamyaing	Ramanya Stadium	10,000
Yadanarbon	Mandalay	Bahtoo Stadium	17,000
Yangon United	Yangon	Yangon United Sports Complex	3,500
Zwegapin United	Hpa-An	Aung Than Lwin Stadium*	3,000

(*) – not ready to play. MNL clubs that have not had their home stadium ready to host home matches currently use Aung San Stadium and Thuwunna Stadium in Yangon.

=== Managerial changes ===
Team	Outgoing manager	Manner of departure	Date of vacancy	Week	Table	Incoming manager
Shan United	(Myanmar) Min Thu	Resign	13 March 2019	Week 5	3	(Myanmar) Aung Naing
Yangon United	(Myanmar) Myo Min Tun	Resign	13 May 2019	Week 11	4	(Myanmar) Tin Maung Tun
Chinland	(Myanmar) U Thar Kyaw	Sacked	30 May 2019	Week 11	11	(Myanmar) U Phone Naing
Dagon	(Myanmar) U Min Kyi	Sacked	30 May 2019	Week 11	12	(Myanmar) U Kyaw Lwin

=== Foreign players ===
Club	Player 1	Player 2	Player 3	Asian Player	Former
Ayeyawady United	(Nigeria) Akwa Raphael Success	(Ivory Coast) Kekere Moukailou	(Liberia) Keith Nah		(Cameroon) Atanga Effa Kostka
Chinland	(Nigeria) George Kehinde	(Nigeria) Emmanuel Ndueso	(Nigeria) Babatunde Abiodun	(South Korea) Shin Junyeong	(Nigeria) Omololu Emmanuel (Nigeria) Sunny Obumneme
Dagon	(Ghana) Samuel Kojo Abbey	(Ivory Coast) Traore Alassane	(Cameroon) Patrick Edubat		(Ivory Coast) Bamba Gaoussou (Nigeria) Ibrahim Kasule (Cameroon) Zama Salif
Hantharwady United	(Ghana) Mark Sekyi	(Nigeria) Michael Henry Alloysius	(Ivory Coast) Frederic Pooda		
Magwe					
Sagaing United	(Ivory Coast) Donald Bissa	(Cameroon) Soulemanou Mandjombe	(Nigeria) Barnabas Friday		
Shan United	(Cameroon) William Nyakwe	(Nigeria) Emmanuel Uzochukwu	(Ivory Coast) Djawa Maximum	(Japan) Ryo Nakamura	(Brazil) Dedimar Ferreira (Brazil) Maycon (Brazil) Gustavo
Southern Myanmar					
Rakhine United	(Ghana) Abubakar Yakubu	(Nigeria) Samuel Chukwuekweka	(Nigeria) Kelvin Kudus Momoh		
Yadanarbon					
Yangon United	(Guinea) Sekou Sylla	(Brazil) Vinicius Miller	(Nigeria) Anderson West	(Japan) Kosuke Uchida	(Ivory Coast) Kekere Moukailou
Zwekapin United	(Cameroon) Outching Yassan		(Japan) Atsushi Shimono	(Japan) Ken Matsumoto	(Cameroon) Patrick Gilles Edubat (Nigeria) Anderson West

=== Personnel and sponsoring ===
Note: Flags indicate national team as has been defined under FIFA eligibility rules. Players may hold more than one non-FIFA nationality.

Team	Head coach	Captain	Kit manufacturer	Shirt sponsor
Ayeyawady United	(Myanmar) U Myo Hlaing Win	(Myanmar) Thiha Zaw	(Thailand) Pro//Sport	(Myanmar) AMI Insurance
Chinland	(Myanmar) U Phone Naing	(Myanmar) Aung Hein Kyaw	made by club	(Myanmar) Gospel for Asia
Dagon	(Myanmar) U Kyaw Lwin	(Myanmar) Aye Ko Ko Maung	(Thailand) Pro//Sport	none
Hantharwady United	(Myanmar) U Ngwe Tun	(Myanmar) Ko Ko Naing	(Thailand) FBT	(Myanmar) Grand Royal
Magwe	(Myanmar) U Zaw Win Tun	(Myanmar) Soe Myat Thu	(Thailand) Pro//Sport	none
Rakhine United	(Myanmar) U Than Wai	(Myanmar) Nyein Chan	(Thailand) Pro//Sport	(Myanmar) UAB Bank
Sagaing United	(Myanmar) U Zaw Linn Tun	(Myanmar) Aung Hlaing Win	(Thailand) FBT	Zaw Gyi Myanmar
Shan United	(Myanmar) U Aung Khine	(Myanmar) Thiha Sithu	(Thailand) Pro//Sport	(Myanmar) KBZ Bank
Southern Myanmar FC	(Myanmar) U Kyaw Min	(Myanmar) Pyae Phyo Aung	(Thailand) Pro//Sport	(Myanmar) Yuzana Group
Yadanarbon	(Myanmar) U Aung Kyaw Moe	(Myanmar) Ye Ko Oo	(Thailand) FBT	(Myanmar) Alpine
Yangon United	(Myanmar) U Tin Maung Tun	(Myanmar) Yan Aung Kyaw	(Thailand) FBT	(Myanmar) AGD Bank
Zwekapin United	(Myanmar) U Min Tun Lin	(Myanmar) Naing Zayar Htun	made by club	(Myanmar) Htay Group

== League table ==
Pos	Team	Pld	W	D	L	GF	GA	GD	Pts	Qualification or relegation
1	Shan United (C)	22	12	10	0	45	21	+24	46	Qualification for AFC Champions League preliminary round 1 (Note: If the league champions cannot qualify for the AFC Champions League group stage, they will enter the AFC Cup group stage.)
2	Ayeyawady United	22	12	8	2	44	19	+25	44	
3	Yangon United	22	12	7	3	40	15	+25	43	Qualification for AFC Cup play-off round (Note: Yangon United qualified for the AFC Cup play-off round as General Aung San Shield winners.)
4	Yadanarbon	22	9	5	8	41	32	+9	32	
5	Hantharwady United	22	9	5	8	28	27	+1	32	
6	Rakhine United	22	7	10	5	28	29	−1	31	
7	Sagaing United	22	7	6	9	36	42	−6	27	
8	Magwe	22	7	3	12	27	33	−6	24	
9	Zwegapin United	22	6	6	10	29	39	−10	24	
10	Southern Myanmar United	22	5	6	11	22	45	−23	21	
11	Dagon FC (R)	22	5	3	14	29	46	−17	18	Relegation to MNL-2
12	Chinland (R)	22	4	5	13	20	41	−21	17	Relegation to MNL-2

Source: MNL
Rules for classification: 1) Points; 2) Goal difference; 3) Goals scored.
(C) Champions; (R) Relegated

== Positions by round ==
The table lists the positions of teams after each week of matches. In order to preserve chronological evolvements, any postponed matches are not included in the round at which they were originally scheduled, but added to the full round they were played immediately afterwards. For example, if a match is scheduled for matchday 13, but then postponed and played between days 16 and 17, it will be added to the standings for day 16.

Team ╲ Round	1	2	3	4	5	6	7	8	9	10	11	12	13	14	15	16	17	18	19	20	21	22
Shan United	7	8	3	7	3	2	1	2	3	4	1	2	3	2	2	2	2	2	2	1	1	1
Hantharwady United	10	7	2	6	2	1	5	4	4	3	2	3	1	3	4	5	4	4	4	4	4	5
Yangon United	2	1	1	5	1	5	4	3	2	1	3	1	2	1	1	1	1	1	1	2	3	3
Yadanarbon	9	9	6	3	7	4	3	1	1	2	4	5	6	6	7	7	6	6	6	6	6	4
Sagaing United	6	10	7	4	6	6	6	5	6	6	5	6	4	5	5	6	7	7	7	7	7	7
Ayeyawady United	8	3	5	2	4	3	2	6	5	5	6	4	5	4	3	3	3	3	3	3	2	2
Rakhine United	5	2	4	1	5	7	7	7	7	7	7	7	7	7	6	4	5	5	5	5	5	6
Magwe	4	11	11	11	9	10	10	11	9	10	8	9	10	11	10	8	8	8	8	8	8	8
Zwegapin United	11	5	8	8	8	9	9	10	8	8	9	8	8	8	8	9	9	9	10	10	9	9
Southern Myanmar United	3	4	10	10	10	8	8	8	10	9	10	12	12	10	9	10	10	10	9	9	10	10
Chinland	12	12	12	12	12	12	12	12	12	12	11	11	11	12	12	12	12	12	12	11	12	12
Dagon FC	1	6	9	9	11	11	11	9	11	11	12	10	9	9	11	11	11	11	11	12	11	11

Leader and qualification for the AFC Champions League preliminary round 1 or AFC Cup group stage
Standby team for AFC Cup group stage
Relegation to the 2020 National League 2

Updated to match(es) played on 15 September 2019. Source: National League

== Results by match played ==
Team \ Match played	1	2	3	4	5	6	7	8	9	10	11	12	13	14	15	16	17	18	19	20	21	22
Ayeyawady United	D	W	D	W	D	W	W	L	D	D	D	W	L	W	W	W	D	W	W	D	W	W
Chinland	L	L	D	L	L	L	D	L	L	W	W	D	L	L	L	W	L	L	D	W	D	L
Dagon FC	W	L	L	L	L	L	L	W	L	L	L	W	W	D	L	L	L	D	L	L	W	D
Hantharwady United	L	W	W	D	W	W	L	W	D	W	D	D	W	L	L	L	W	D	W	L	L	L
Magwe	D	L	L	L	W	L	L	L	W	L	W	L	L	D	W	D	W	W	L	W	L	L
Rakhine United	D	W	D	W	L	D	D	D	D	W	D	L	W	D	W	W	L	D	W	L	D	L
Sagaing United	D	L	W	W	D	D	W	W	L	D	W	D	W	L	L	L	L	D	L	W	L	L
Shan United	D	D	W	D	W	W	W	D	D	D	W	D	D	W	W	W	D	D	W	W	W	W
Southern Myanmar United	W	L	L	L	D	W	L	L	L	D	D	L	L	W	W	L	L	D	W	L	D	D
Yadanarbon	D	D	W	W	L	W	W	W	W	L	L	D	L	L	L	D	W	D	L	W	L	W
Yangon United	W	W	L	D	W	L	W	W	W	D	L	W	D	W	W	W	W	D	D	D	D	W
Zwegapin United	L	W	D	D	D	L	L	L	W	D	L	D	W	D	L	L	W	L	L	L	W	W

Updated to match(es) played on 15 September 2019. Source: National League
W = Win; D = Draw; L = Loss

== Matches ==
Fixtures and results of the Myanmar National League 2019 season.

=== Week 1 ===
12 January 2019	Sagaing United	2–2	Shan United	Monywa Stadium, Monywa
15:30 UTC+06:30	Kyaw Swar Min 28'; Myo Min Phyo 57'		Maycon 21', 80' (pen.)

12 January 2019	Yangon United	3–1	Hnathawady United	Thuwunna Stadium, Yangon
16:00 UTC+06:30	Sylla Sekou 11', 32'; Kyi Lin 21'		Mark Sekyi 90'

13 January 2019	Dagon	3–1	Zwekapin United	Thuwunna Stadium, Yangon
16:00 UTC+06:30	Soe Myat Thu 4', 45+1'; Myo Min Zaw 65'		Ken 9'

13 January 2019	Southern Myanmar	2–0	Chinland	Yamanya Stadium, Mawlamyine
15:30 UTC+06:30	Win Min Htut 59'; Htoo Htoo Aung 90+4'

13 January 2019	Yadanarbon	1–1	Ayeyawady United	Bahtoo Stadium, Mandalay
16:00 UTC+06:30	Myat Kaung Khant 90+1'		Zaw Lin 60'

15 January 2019	Rakhine United	2–2	Magwe	Waithali Stadium, Sittwe
15:30 UTC+06:30	Samuel 5'; Kelvin 76'		Soe Myat Thu 8'; Zin Min Tun 56'

=== Week 2 ===
19 January 2019	Yadanarbon	2–2	Shan United	Bahtoo Stadium, Mandalay
15:30 UTC+06:30	Win Naing Tun 13', 90+3'		Maycon 10'; Htet Phyo Wai 54'

19 January 2019	Rakhine United	3–0	Dagon	Waithali Stadium, Sittwe
15:30 UTC+06:30	Samuel 31'; Chan Oo 71'; Ti Nyein Minn 90'

19 January 2019	Zwekapin United	3–2	Southern Myanmar	Thuwunna Stadium, Yangon
16:00 UTC+06:30	Thein Tan 23'; Patrick 29'; Andersen West 59'		Htoo Htoo Aung 10'; Kaung Sithu 59'

20 January 2019	Yangon United	4–1	Chinland	Y.U.S.C Stadium, Yangon
15:30 UTC+06:30	Sylla Sekou 21', 44'; Maung Maung Lwin 22'; Kyi Lin 39'		Zaw Lin 59' (pen.)

20 January 2019	Sagaing United	0–1	Hanthawaddy United	Monywa Stadium, Sagaing
15:30 UTC+06:30			Lar Din Maw Yar 54'

20 January 2019	Magwe	0–2	Ayeyawady United	Thuwunna Satdium, Yangon
16:00 UTC+06:30			Yan Pai Soe 20', 88'

=== Week 3 ===
26 January 2019	Sagaing United	6–0	Southern Myanmar	Monywa Stadium, Sagaing
15:30 UTC+06:30	Toe Sat Naing 16'; Friday 40'; Donald Bissa 49', 62', 82'; Kyaw Swar Min 56'

26 January 2019	Rakhine United	1–1	Zwekapin United	Waithali Stadium, Sittwe
15:30 UTC+06:30	Zaw Zaw Naing 59'		Patrick 3' (pen.)

26 January 2019	Dagon	2–5	Shan United	Thuwunna Stadium, Yangon
16:00 UTC+06:30	Zama Salif 74'; Soe Myat Thu 90+2'		Gustavo 4'; Maycon 49'; Zin Min Tun 55'; Suan Lam Mang 60'; Dway Ko Ko Chit 90'

27 January 2019	Yadanarbon	3–2	Yangon United	Bahtoo Stadium, Mandalay
15:30 UTC+06:30	Win Naing Soe 16'; Hlaing Bo Bo 48'; Win Naing Tun 58'		Miller 30'; Kaung Htet Soe 71'

27 January 2019	Hanthawady United	1–0	Magwe	Bago Stadium, Bago
15:30 UTC+06:30	Frederic Pooda 75'

27 January 2019	Chinland	1–1	Ayeyawady United	Thuwunna Satdium, Yangon
16:00 UTC+06:30	Emmanuel 4'		Success 15'

=== Week 4 ===
1 February 2019	Zwegabin United	1–1	Yangon United	Thuwunna Stadium, Yangon
16:00 UTC+06:30	Ken Matsumoto 55'		Miller 4'

2 February 2019	Yadanarbon	1–0	Magwe	Bahtoo Stadium, Mandalay
15:30 UTC+06:30	Win Naing Tun 67'

2 February 2019	Sagaing United	3–0	Chinland	Monywa Stadium, Monywa
16:00 UTC+06:30	Donald Bissa 1'; Kyaw Swar Min 21'; Friday 75'

3 February 2019	Hanthawady United	1–1	Shan United	Grand Royal Stadium, Bago
15:30 UTC+06:30	Micheal 36'		Yan Naing Oo 21'

3 February 2019	Rakhine United	1–0	Southern Myanmar	Waithali Stadium, Sittwe
15:30 UTC+06:30	Aung Thant Zaw 6'

3 February 2019	Dagon	1–2	Ayeyawady United	Thuwunna Satdium, Yangon
16:00 UTC+06:30	Aung Khine Tun 24'		Nan Hteik Zaw 16'; Lwin Moe Aung 54'

=== Week 5 ===
2 March 2019	Ayeyawady United	1–1	Southern Myanmar	Ayar Stadium, Pathein
15:40 UTC+06:30	Keith Martu Nah 83'		Phyo Paing Soe 56'

2 March 2019	Magwe	2–0	Dagon	Thuwunna Stadium, Yangon
16:00 UTC+06:30	Naing Naing Kyaw 65'; Soe Lwin Lwin 90+1'

3 March 2019	Yadanarbon	0–2	Hanthawady United	Bahtoo Stadium, Mandalay
16:00 UTC+06:30			Mark Sekyi 9'; Htet Lin Lin 57'

3 March 2019	Rakhine United	0–1	Yangon United	Waithali Stadium, Sittwe
15:30 UTC+06:30			Maung Maung Lwin 66'

3 March 2019	Chinland	0–3	Shan United	Thuwunna Stadium, Yangon
15:30 UTC+06:30			Maycon 43'; Zin Min Tun 51'; Suan Lam Mang 57'

4 March 2019	Sagaing United	1–1	Zwekapin United	Monywa Stadium, Monywa
15:30 UTC+06:30	Friday 30'		Ken Matsumoto 18'

=== Week 6 ===
30 March 2019	Yangon United	0–1	Ayeyawady United	YUSC Stadium, Yangon
16:00 UTC+06:30			Zaw Win 45+1' (pen.)

30 March 2019	Yadanarbon	1–0	Dagon	Bahtoo Stadium, Mandalay
16:00 UTC+06:30	Win Naing Soe 36'

30 March 2019	Hanthawady United	1–0	Chinland	Grand Royal Stadium, Bago
16:00 UTC+06:30	Aung Myo Thura 43'

30 March 2019	Zwekapin United	0–4	Shan United	Thuwunna Stadium, Yangon
16:00 UTC+06:30			Gustavo 8' (pen.); Maycon 32', 71', 87'

31 March 2019	Rakhine United	3–3	Sagaing United	Waithali Stadium, Sittwe
16:00 UTC+06:30	Aung Kyaw Thu 17'; Samuel 24'; Kelvin 90+5'		Friday 11', 70'; Thant Zin Win 39'

31 March 2019	Southern Myanmar	2–1	Magwe	Yamanya Stadium, Mawlamyine
16:00 UTC+06:30	Kaung Sithu 47', 85'		Aung Myint Tun 62'

=== Week 7 ===
6 April 2019	Zwekapin United	0–4	Yadanarbon	Thuwunna Stadium, Yangon
16:00 UTC+06:30			Win Naing Soe 13(pen)', 15', 75', 90+3'

6 April 2019	Sagaing United	3–0	Dagon	Monywa Stadium, Monywa
16:00 UTC+06:30	Donald Bissa 15'; Aung Hlaing Win 31'; Thant Zin Win 73'

7 April 2019	Rakhine United	0–0	Chinland	Waithali Stadium, Sittwe
16:00 UTC+06:30

7 April 2019	Magwe	0–1	Shan United	Thuwunna Stadium, Yangon
16:00 UTC+06:30			Gustavo 64'

7 April 2019	Yangon United	4–0	Southern Myanmar	YUSC Stadium, Yangon
16:00 UTC+06:30	Sylla Sekou 13'; Maung Maung Lwin 16'; Soe Min Naing 36', 65'

7 April 2019	Ayeyawady United	3–1	Hanthawady United	Ayar Stadium, Pathein
16:00 UTC+06:30	Keith 7'; Aung Kyaw Naing 17', 90+2'		Aung Myo Thura 27'

=== Week 8 ===
20 April 2019	Chinland	1–2	Yadanabon	Thuwunna Stadium, Yangon
16:00 UTC+06:30	Babadunde Abiodun 32'		Win Naing Tun 15', 69'

21 April 2019	Rakhine United	0–0	Shan United	Waithali Stadium, Sittwe
16:00 UTC+06:30

21 April 2019	Magwe	2–3	Yangon United	Thuwunna Stadium, Yangon
16:00 UTC+06:30	Pyae Moe 43'; Soe Lwin Lwin 70'		Maung Maung Lwin 8'; Sylla Sekou 57'; Than Paing 85'

21 April 2019	Hanthawady United	2–0	Zwekapin United	Grand Royal Stadium, Bago
16:00 UTC+06:30	Htet Lin Lin 32'; Hein Htet Aung 45+3'

22 April 2019	Dagon	3–2	Southern Myanmar	Thuwunna Stadium, Yangon
16:00 UTC+06:30	Zwe Khant 13', 89'; Bamba 58'		Aung Hein Soe Oo 48'; Kaung Sithu 78'

22 April 2019	Saging United	2–1	Ayeyawady United	Monywa Stadium, Monywa
16:00 UTC+06:30	Akanmidu Friday 3', 36'		Thiha Zaw 6'

=== Week 9 ===
27 April 2019	Rakhine United	1–1	Hanthawady United	Waithali Stadium, Sittwe
16:00 UTC+06:30	Samuel 34'		Aung Myo Thura 71'

27 April 2019	Zwekapin United	3–1	Chinland	Thuwunna Stadium, Yangon
16:00 UTC+06:30	Patrick 56' (pen.); Aung Zin Phyo 78', 90+2'		Tint Aung Kyaw 90'

27 April 2019	Sagaing United	1–4	Magwe	Thuwunna Stadium, Yangon
16:00 UTC+06:30	Donald Bissa 31'		Pyae Moe 70'; Zin Min Tun 80'; Naing Naing Kyaw 84', 88'

28 April 2019	Southern Myanmar	1–3	Yadanarbon	Mawlamyine Stadium, Mawlamyine
16:00 UTC+06:30	Yan Kyaw Htwe 27'		Myat Kaung Khant 18'; Bi Bi 31'; Win Naing Soe 77' (pen.)

28 April 2019	Dagon	0–2	Yangon United	Thuwunna Stadium, Yangon
16:00 UTC+06:30			Sylla Sekou 55', 89'

28 April 2019	Ayeyawady United	2–2	Shan United	Ayar Stadium, Pathein
16:00 UTC+06:30	Thiha Zaw 28'; Keith Martu Nah 46'		Gustavo 45+1'; Dway Ko Ko Chit 67'

=== Week 10 ===
4 May 2019	Hanthawady United	2–1	Dagon	Grand Royal Stadium, Bago
16:00 UTC+06:30	Myo Zaw Oo 32'; Hein Htet Aung 35'		Bamba 8'

4 May 2019	Yangon United	1–1	Sagaing United	Y.U.S.C Stadium, Yangon
16:00 UTC+06:30	Maung Maung Lwin 79'		Friday 23'

4 May 2019	Chinland	2–0	Magwe	Thuwunna Stadium, Yangon
16:00 UTC+06:30	John Badu 11'; Soe Min Aung 70' (o.g)

5 May 2019	Rakhine United	3–2	Yadanarbon	Waithali Stadium, Sittwe
16:00 UTC+06:30	Abubaka 57'; Zaw Zaw Naing 59'; Samuel 90'		Win Naing Soe 22', 78'

5 May 2019	Southern Myanmar	0–0	Shan United	Ramanya Stadium, Mawlamyine
16:00 UTC+06:30

5 May 2019	Zwekapin United	1–1	Ayeyawady United	Thuwunna Stadium, Yangon
16:00 UTC+06:30	Edubat 68'		Aung Kyaw Naing 76'

=== Week 11 ===
11 May 2019	Yangon United	1–2	Shan United	Y.U.S.C, Yangon
16:00 UTC+06:30	Kosuke Uchida 74'		Maycon 38'; Zin Min Tun 42'

11 May 2019	Rakhine United	0–0	Ayeyawady United	Waithali Stadium, Sittwe
16:00 UTC+06:30

11 May 2019	Dagon	2–3	Chinland	Thuwunna Stadium, Yangon
16:00 UTC+06:30	Bamba 4'; Zwe Khant 15'		Babatunde Abiodun 39'; Mung Thein Pau 47'; David Lalhruat Fela 74'

12 May 2019	Yadanarbon	0–1	Sagaing United	Bahtoo Stadium, Mandalay
16:00 UTC+06:30			Dornald Bissa 76'

12 May 2019	Southern Myanmar	0–0	Hanthawady United	Ramanya Stadium, Mawlamyine
16:00 UTC+06:30

12 May 2019	Zwekapin United	1–1	Magwe	Thuwunna Stadium, Yangon
16:00 UTC+06:30	Sitt Mone 41'		Soe Lwin Lwin 33', 57'

=== Week 12 ===
15 June 2019	Shan United	1–1	Chinland	Taunggyi Stadium, Taunggyi
16:00 UTC+06:30	Maximum 85'		Emmanuel Ndueso 50'

15 June 2019	Southern Myanmar	0–4	Ayeyawady United	Ramanya Stadium, Mawlamyine
16:00 UTC+06:30			Rapheal Success 4'; Thiha Zaw 21', 84'; Keith Martu Nah 45+1'

15 June 2019	Zwekapin United	2–2	Sagaing United	Thuwunna Stadium, Yangon
16:00 UTC+06:30	Kyi Lin 3' (pen.); Yassan 14'		Donald Bissa 69', 90+3'

15 June 2019	Hanthawady United	0–0	Yadanarbon	Grand Royal Stadium, Bago
16:00 UTC+06:30

16 June 2019	Yangon United	4–0	Rakhine United	Y.U.S.C Stadium, Yangon
16:00 UTC+06:30	Kaung Htet Soe 11'; Miller 22'; Sekou Sylla 78'; Than Paing 90+2'

16 June 2019	Dagon	3–0	Magwe	Thuwunna Stadium, Yangon
16:00 UTC+06:30	Soe Myat Thu 32' (o.g); Aung Khine Tun 51'; Traore Alassane 58'

=== Week 13 ===
22 June 2019	Sagaing United	2–1	Yadanarbon	Monywa Stadium, Monywa
16:00 UTC+06:30	Zaw Ye Tun 30' (o.g); Wai Phyo Thu 60'		Thein Than Win 31'

22 June 2019	Magwe	1–2	Zwekapin United	Thuwunna Stadium, Yangon
16:00 UTC+06:30	Aung Zaw Myint 67'		Outching Yassan 7'; Kyi Lin 85'

22 June 2019	Hanthawady United	4–1	Southern Myanmar	Grand Royal Stadium, Bago
16:00 UTC+06:30	Mark Sekyi 9', 23' (pen.), 70'; Htet Lin Lin 36'		Shine Thuya 45' (pen.)

23 June 2019	Chinland	1–3	Dagon	Thuwunna Stadium, Yangon
16:00 UTC+06:30	David Lalhruat Fela 65'		Nyi Nyi Min 4'; Traore Alassane 20', 90+3'

23 June 2019	Shan United	0–0	Yangon United	Taunggyi Stadium, Taunggyi
16:00 UTC+06:30

23 June 2019	Ayeyawady United	1–2	Rakhine United	Ayar Stadium, Pathein
16:00 UTC+06:30	Kekere Moukailou 90+2'		Abubakar 65'; Samuel 86'

=== Week 14 ===
28 June 2019	Chinland	1–2	Southern Myanmar	Thuwunna Stadium, Yangon
16:00 UTC+06:30	Emmanuel Ndueso 70'		Win Min Htut 84'; Kaung Sithu 90+3'

29 June 2019	Hanthawaddy United	0–1	Yangon United	Grand Royal Stadium, Bago
16:00 UTC+06:30			Than Paing 48'

28 June 2019	Magwe	1–1	Rakhine United	Thuwunna Stadium, Yangon
16:00 UTC+06:30	Aung Myint Tun 10'		Chit Su Moe 88'

29 June 2019	Ayeyawady United	5–2	Yadanarbon	Ayar Stadium, Pathein
16:00 UTC+06:30	Keith Martu Nah 20' (pen.), 38', 47'; Thiha Zaw 23'; Aung Kaung Mann 78'		Thein Than Win 25'; Win Naing Tun 85' (pen.)

29 June 2019	Shan United	2–0	Sagaing United	Taunggyi Stadium, Taunggyi
16:00 UTC+06:30	Maximum 26'; William 36'

29 June 2019	Zwekapin United	0–0	Dagon	Thuwunna Stadium, Yangon
16:00 UTC+06:30

=== Week 15 ===
6 July 2019	Yangon United	1–0	Yadanarbon	Y.U.S.C Stadium, Yangon
16:00 UTC+06:30	Than Paing 65'

6 July 2019	Shan United	4–2	Dagon	Taunggyi Stadium, Taunggyi
16:00 UTC+06:30	Emmanuel 2', 4', 13'; Maximum 51'		Patrick Edubat 17', 57'

6 July 2019	Magwe	2–0	Hanthawady United	Thuwunna Stadium, Yangon
16:00 UTC+06:30	Zin Min Tun 86', 90+4'

7 July 2019	Southern Myanmar	4–2	Sagaing United	Mawlamyine Stadium, Mawlamyine
16:00 UTC+06:30	Ye Htet Aung 11'; Kaung Sithu 16' (pen.), 76'; Shine Thura 79'		Myo Min Phyo 35'; Friday 42'

7 July 2019	Ayeyawady United	2–1	Chinland	Ayar Stadium, Pathein
16:00 UTC+06:30	Success 7'; Keith Martu Nah 13' (pen.)		Htun Lin Aung 24'

7 July 2019	Zwekapin United	3–4	Rakhine United	Thuwunna Stadium, Yangon
16:00 UTC+06:30	Yassan 4'; Thein Tan 53'; Ken Matsumoto 55'		Aung Thant Zaw 8'; Zaw Thein Win 68', 76'; Samuel 90+3'

=== Week 16 ===
13 July 2019	Magwe	1–1	Yadanarbon	Thuwunna Stadium, Yangon
16:00 UTC+06:30	Zin Min Tun 35'		Win Naing Tun 77'

13 July 2019	Southern Myanmar	0–1	Rakhine United	Ramanya Stadium, Mawlamyine
15:30 UTC+06:30			Samuel 54'

13 July 2019	Ayeyawady United	1–0	Dagon	Ayar Stadium, Pathein
15:30 UTC+06:30	Nanda Lin Kyaw Chit 2'

14 July 2019	Yangon United	1–0	Zwekapin United	Y.U.S.C Stadium, Yangon
15:30 UTC+06:30	Maung Maung Lwin 61'

14 July 2019	Shan United	3–2	Hanthawady United	Taunggyi Stadium, Taunggyi
15:30 UTC+06:30	Ko Ko Naing 48' (o.g); Maximum 67' (pen.); Hein Thiha Zaw 90+3'		Shwe Hlaing Win 8'; Pooda 40'

14 July 2019	Chinland	2–1	Sagaing United	Thuwunna Stadium, Yangon
16:00 UTC+06:30	Htun Lin Aung 14', 44'		Donald Bissa 15'

=== Week 17 ===
20 July 2019	Magwe	2–0	Sagaing United	Thuwunna Stadium, Yangon
16:00 UTC+06:30	Zin Min Tun 8'; Pyae Moe 22'

20 July 2019	Hanthawady United	2–1	Rakhine United	Grand Royal Stadium, Bago
15:30 UTC+06:30	Nyi Nyi Aung(2) 25'; Nay Thura Aung 89' (o.g)		Nyein Chan 55'

20 July 2019	Yangon United	3–0	Dagon	Y.U.S.C Stadium, Yangon
15:30 UTC+06:30	Kaung Htet Soe 5', 42'; Maung Maung Lwin 49'

21 July 2019	Shan United	1–1	Ayeyawady United	Taunggyi Stadium, Taunggyi
15:30 UTC+06:30	Emmanuel 75'		Aung Kyaw Naing 21'

21 July 2019	Yadanarbon	3–0	Southern Myanmar	Mandalarthiri Stadium, Mandalay
15:30 UTC+06:30	Win Naing Tun 32'; Win Naing Soe 80'; Hlaing Bo Bo 82'

21 July 2019	Chinland	0–3	Zwekapin United	Thuwunna Stadium, Yangon
16:00 UTC+06:30			Yassaun 36'; Aung Zin Phyo 87'; Nyi Nyi Tun 90+2'

=== Week 18 ===
27 July 2019	Magwe	1–0	Chinland	Thuwunna Stadium, Yangon
16:00 UTC+06:30	Zin Min Tun 51'

27 July 2019	Shan United	1–1	Southern Myanmar	Taunggyi Stadium, Taunggyi
15:30 UTC+06:30	Emmanuel 42'		Kaung Sithu 2'

27 July 2019	Ayeyawady United	3–1	Zwekapin United	Ayar Stadium, Pathein
15:30 UTC+06:30	Success 21', 89'; Aung Kaung Mann 64'		Aung Zin Phyo 90+2'

28 July 2019	Yadanarbon	1–1	Rakhine United	Mandalar Thiri Stadium, Mandalay
15:30 UTC+06:30	Hlaing Bo Bo 90+1'		Zaw Ye Tun 71' (o.g)

28 July 2019	Dagon	1–1	Hanthawady United	Thuwunna Stadium, Yangon
16:00 UTC+06:30	Patrick 12'		Htet Lin Lin 76'

28 July 2019	Sagaing United	0–0	Yangon United	Monywa Stadium, Monywa
15:30 UTC+06:30

=== Week 19 ===
3 August 2019	Dagon	1–2	Rakhine United	Thuwunna Stadium, Yangon
16:00 UTC+06:30	Nyi Nyi Min 21'		Chan Oo 26'; Zaw Thein Win 90'

3 August 2019	Hanthawady United	4–1	Sagaing United	Grand Royal Stadium, Bago
15:30 UTC+06:30	Nyi Nyi Aung(2) 36'; Pooda Frederic 59', 74'; Htet Lin Lin 86'		Donald Bissa 67'

3 August 2019	Ayeyawady United	2–0	Magwe	Ayar Stadium, Pathein
15:30 UTC+06:30	Keith Martu Nah 25'; Tin Win Aung 65'

4 August 2019	Shan United	3–2	Yadanarbon	Taunggyi Stadium, Taunggyi
15:30 UTC+06:30	William 23'; Emmanuel 76'; Nanda Kyaw 80'		Myat Kaung Khant 23'; Win Naing Soe 71' (pen.)

4 August 2019	Southern Myanmar	3–1	Zwekapin United	Mawlamyine Stadium, Mawlamyine
15:30 UTC+06:30	Kaung Sithu 13' (pen.); Shine Thuya 50'; Myo Wai Lin 90+6'		Thein Tan 90+5'

4 August 2019	Chinland	1–1	Yangon United	Thuwunna Stadium, Yangon
16:00 UTC+06:30	Babatunde 90+2'		Aung Hein Kyaw 29' (o.g)

=== Week 20 ===
10 August 2019	Dagon	2–5	Yadanarbon	Thuwunna Stadium, Yangon
16:00 UTC+06:30	Patrick 23'; Traore 48' (pen.)		Win Naing Soe 27', 45', 59', 86'; Myat Kaung Khant 64'

10 August 2019	Ayeyawady United	1–1	Yangon United	Ayar Stadium, Pathein
15:30 UTC+06:30	Aung Kaung Mann 65'		Than Paing 23'

11 August 2019	Shan United	2–1	Zwekapin United	Taunggyi Stadium, Taunggyi
15:30 UTC+06:30	Nanda Kyaw 28'; Dway Ko Ko Chit 53'		Aung Moe Htwe 41'

11 August 2019	Sagaing United	2–1	Rakhine United	Monywa Stadium, Monywa
15:30 UTC+06:30	Donald Bissa 48', 62'		Aung Thant Zaw 90+4'

11 August 2019	Magwe	5–0	Southern Myanmar	Thuwunna Stadium, Yangon
15:30 UTC+06:30	Thiha 20'; Naing Naing Kyaw 39'; Pyae Moe 55'; Aung Zaw Myint 86', 90+3'

12 August 2019	Chinland	2–0	Hanthawady United	Thuwunna Stadium, Yangon
16:00 UTC+06:30	George 22'; Mung Teih Pau 63'

=== Week 21 ===
17 August 2019	Southern Myanmar	0–0	Yangon United	Mawlamyine Stadium, Mawlamyine
15:30 UTC+06:30

17 August 2019	Dagon	5–2	Sagaing United	Thuwunna Stadium, Yangon
16:00 UTC+06:30	Nyi Nyi Min 2'; Traore 4' (pen.), 43'; Patrick 30', 41'		Phoe Chit 72' (pen.); Donald Bissa 83' (pen.)

18 August 2019	Hanthawad United	1–3	Ayeyawady United	Grand Royal Stadium, Bago
15:30 UTC+06:30	Mark Sekyi 86'		Success 30', 65', 69' (pen.)

18 August 2019	Shan United	2–0	Magwe	Taunggyi Stadium, Taunggyi
15:30 UTC+06:30	Ryo Nakamura 65'; Htet Phyo Wai 77'

18 August 2019	Chinland	0–0	Rakhine United	Thuwunna Stadium, Yangon
16:00 UTC+06:30

20 August 2019	Yadanarbon	1–2	Zwekapin United	Mandalarthiri Stadium, Mandalay
16:00 UTC+06:30	Win Naing Tun 74'		Yassan 4'; Aung Zin Phyo 48'

=== Week 22 ===
15 September 2019	Ayeyawady United	6–0	Sagaing United	Ayar Stadium, Pathein
15:30 UTC+06:30	Soe Moe Kyaw 19'; Success 21', 64'; Aung Kyaw Naing 34'; Keith Martu Nah 42' (pen.); Aung Kaung Mann 90+3'

15 September 2019	Yadanarbon	6–2	Chinland	Mandalar Thiri Stadium, Mandalay
16:00 UTC+06:30	Hlaing Bo Bo 10'; Win Naing Soe 35', 37', 90'; Myat Kaung Khant 42'; Maung Maung Soe 90+2'		Babatunde Abiodun 85'; Aung Hein Kyaw 90+3'

15 September 2019	Shan United	4–1	Rakhine United	Taunggyi Stadium, taunggyi
15:30 UTC+06:30	Dway Ko Ko Chit 63', 87'; William 68'; Maximum 81'		Samuel 84' (pen.)

15 September 2019	Yangon United	6–1	Magwe	Y.U.S.C Stadium, Yangon
15:30 UTC+06:30	Than Paing 3'; Maung Maung Lwin 54'; Sylla Sekou 63'; Soe Min Naing 73', 78'; Thurain Soe 90+2'		Pyae Moe 83'

15 September 2019	Southern Myanmar	0–0	Dagon	Mawlamyine Stadium, Mawlamyine
16:00 UTC+06:30

15 September 2019	Zwekapin United	2–0	Hanthawady United	Thuwunna Stadium, Yangon
16:00 UTC+06:30	Yassan 29'; Aung Zin Phyo 44'

== Season statistics ==
=== Top scorers ===
As of 15 September 2019.

Rank	Player	Club	Goals
1	(Myanmar) Win Naing Soe	Yadanarbon	18
2	(Ivory Coast) Donald Bissa	Sagaing United	14
3	(Myanmar) Win Naing Tun	Yadanarbon	10
3	(Cameroon) Patrick Edubat	Dagon	10
3	(Liberia) Keith Martu Nah	Ayeyawady United	10
3	(Guinea) Sekou Sylla	Yangon United	10
4	(Myanmar) Kaung Sithu	Southern Myanmar	9
4	(Nigeria) Bernard Friday	Sagaing United	9
4	(Nigeria) Rapheal Success	Ayeyawady United	9
5	(Myanmar) Zin Min Tun	Magwe	8
5	(Myanmar) Maung Maung Lwin	Yangon United	8
5	(Nigeria) Samuel	Rakhine United	8
7	(Myanmar) Than Paing	Yangon United	6
7	(Myanmar) Pyae Moe	Magwe	6
7	(Myanmar) Aung Zin Phyo	Zwekapin United	6
7	(Cameroon) Outching Yassan	Zwekapin United	6
7	(Ghana) Mark Sekyi	Hanthawady United	6
7	(Nigeria) Traore Alassane	Dagon	6
8	(Myanmar) Hlaing Bo Bo	Yadanarbon	5
8	(Myanmar) Aung Kyaw Naing	Ayeyawady United	5
8	(Myanmar) Dway Ko Ko Chit	Shan United	5
8	(Nigeria) Emmanuel	Shan United	5
8	(Ivory Coast) Maximum	Shan United	5
9	(Myanmar) Soe Lwin Lwin	Magwe	4
9	(Myanmar) Kaung Htet Soe	Yangon United	4
9	(Myanmar) Kyi Lin	Zwekapin United	4
9	(Myanmar) Thiha Zaw	Ayeyawady United	4
9	(Myanmar) Aung Kaung Mann	Ayeyawady United	4
9	(Myanmar) Naing Naing Kyaw	Magwe	4
9	(Myanmar) Myat Kaung Khant	Yadanarbon	4
10	(Myanmar) Soe Myat Thu	Dagon	3
10	(Myanmar) Kyaw Swar Min	Sagaing United	3
10	(Myanmar) Zin Min Tun	Shan United	3
10	(Myanmar) Htet Lin Lin	Hanthawady United	3
10	(Myanmar) Htun Lin Aung	Chinland	3
10	(Japan) Ken	Zwekapin United	3
11	(Myanmar) Yan Pai Soe	Ayeyawady United	2
11	(Myanmar) Aung Myo Thura	Hanthawady United	2
11	(Myanmar) Soe Min Naing	Yangon United	2
11	(Myanmar) Htoo Htoo Aung	Southern Myanmar	2
11	(Myanmar) Htet Phyo Wai	Shan United	2
11	(Myanmar) Suan Lam Mang	Shan United	2
11	(Ivory Coast) William	Shan United	2
11	(Myanmar) Nanda Kyaw	Shan United	2
11	(Myanmar) Zaw Lin	Ayeyawady United	2
11	(Nigeria) Kelvin	Rakhine United	2
11	(Myanmar) Zaw Thein Win	Rakhine United	2
11	(Myanmar) Thant Zin Win	Sagaing United	2
11	(Myanmar) Hein Htet Aung	Hanthawady United	2
11	(Myanmar) Zaw Zaw Naing	Rakhine United	2
11	(Brazil) Miller	Yangon United	2
11	(Ghana) Abubakar	Rakhine United	2
11	(Myanmar) Aung Myint Tun	Magwe	2
11	(Myanmar) Aung Zaw Myint	Magwe	2
11	(Myanmar) Win Min Htut	Southern Myanmar	2
11	(Myanmar) Shine Thuya	Southern Myanmar	2
11	(Myanmar) Thein Than Win	Yadanarbon	2
11	(Myanmar) Myo Min Phyo	Sagaing United	2
11	(Myanmar) Thein Tan	Zwekapin United	2
11	(Myanmar) Tint Aung Kyaw	Chinland	2
11	(Myanmar) Mong Teih Pau	Chinland	2
11	(Ivory Coast) Frederic Pooda	Hanthawady United	2
11	(Myanmar) Nyi Nyi Min	Dagon	2
12	(Ivory Coast) Kekere Moukailou	Ayeyawady United	1
12	(Myanmar) Tin Win Aung	Ayeyawady United	1
12	(Myanmar) Soe Moe Kyaw	Ayeyawady United	1
12	(Myanmar) Nanda Lin Kyaw Chit	Ayeyawady United	1
12	(Myanmar) Aung Hlaing Win	Sagaing United	1
12	(Myanmar) Aung Kyaw Thu	Rakhine United	1
12	(Myanmar) Aung Thant Zaw	Rakhine United	1
12	(Myanmar) Chan Oo	Rakhine United	1
12	(Myanmar) Ti Nyein Minn	Rakhine United	1
12	(Myanmar) Aung Thein Win	Rakhine United	1
12	(Japan) Kosuke Uchida	Yangon United	1
12	(Myanmar) Myo Zaw Oo	Hanthawady United	1
12	(Myanmar) Lar Din Maw Yar	Hanthawady United	1
12	(Myanmar) Shwe Hlaing Win	Hanthawady United	1
12	(Myanmar) Nyi Nyi Aung(2)	Hanthawady United	1
12	(Myanmar) Emmanuel Ndueso	Chinland	1
12	(Nigeria) George Kehinde	Chinland	1
12	(Myanmar) David Lalhruat Fela	Chinland	1
12	(Nigeria) Babatunde Abiodun	Chinland	1
12	(Myanmar) Myo Min Zaw	Dagon	1
12	(Myanmar) Zwe Khant	Dagon	1
12	(Myanmar) Aung Khine Tun	Dagon	1
12	(Myanmar) Sitt Mone	Zwekapin United	1
12	(Myanmar) Nyi Nyi Tun	Zwekapin United	1
12	(Myanmar) Aung Moe Htwe	Zwekapin United	1
12	(Nigeria) Andersen West	Yangon United	1
12	(Myanmar) Thurein Soe	Yangon United	1
12	(Myanmar) Kyaw Zin Soe	Yadanarbon	1
12	(Myanmar) Maung Maung Soe	Yadanarbon	1
12	(Myanmar) Bi Bi	Yadanarbon	1
12	(Myanmar) Ye Htet Aung	Southern Myanmar	1
12	(Myanmar) Phyo Paing Soe	Southern Myanmar	1
12	(Myanmar) Yan Kyaw Htwe	Southern Myanmar	1
12	(Myanmar) Soe Myat Thu	Magwe	1
12	(Myanmar) Thiha	Magwe	1
12	(Japan) Ryo Nakamura	Shan United	1
12	(Myanmar) Hein Thiha Zaw	Shan United	1
12	(Myanmar) Toe Sat Naing	Sagaing United	1
12	(Myanmar) Wai Phyo Thu	Sagaing United	1
12	(Myanmar) Phoe Chit	Sagaing United	1

=== Top assistants ===
As of 16 September 2019.

Rank	Player	Club	Assists
1	(Nigeria) Raphel Success	Ayeyawady United	7
2	(Myanmar) Myat Kaung Khant	Yadanarbon	6
3	(Myanmar) Thiha Zaw	Ayeyawady United	5
3	(Myanmar) Nanda Kyaw	Shan United	5
4	(Myanmar) Kyi Lin	Zwekapin United	4
4	(Brazil) Vinicius Miller	Yangon United	4
4	(Myanmar) Aee Soe	Yangon United	4
4	(Cameroon) Abubakar Yakubu	Rakhine United	4
4	(Myanmar) Htet Lin Lin	Hanthawady United	4
4	(Guinea) Sylla Sekou	Yangon United	4
4	(Ivory Coast) Donald Bissa	Sagaing United	3
4	(Myanmar) Myo Min Phyo	Sagaing United	3
4	(Myanmar) Kyaw Swar Min	Sagaing United	3
4	(Myanmar) Tin Win Aung	Ayeyawady United	3
4	(Liberia) Keith Martu Nah	Ayeyawady United	3
4	(Myanmar) Maung Maung Lwin	Yangon United	3
4	(Japan) Ken Matsumoto	Zwekapin United	3
4	(Cameroon) Outching Yassan	Zwekapin United	3
4	(Ivory Coast) Frederic Pooda	Hanthawady United	3
4	(Myanmar) Myo Min Zaw	Dagon	3
4	(Myanmar) Nyi Nyi Min	Dagon	3
5	(Myanmar) Aung Myint Tun	Magwe	2
5	(Myanmar) Aung Kyaw Naing	Ayeyawady United	2
5	(Myanmar) Than Htet Aung	Chinland	2
5	(Myanmar) Zaw Zaw Naing	Rakhine United	2
5	(Myanmar) Kaung Sithu	Southern Myanmar	2
5	(Myanmar) Aung Moe	Southern Myanmar	2
5	(Myanmar) Hein Nay San	Yadanarbon	2
5	(Myanmar) Win Naing Tun	Yadanarbon	2
5	(Myanmar) Thiha Zaw	Yangon United	2
5	(Myanmar) Than Paing	Yangon United	2
5	(Myanmar) Kaung Htet Soe	Yangon United	2
5	(Myanmar) Set Phyo Wai	Shan United	2
5	(Cameroon) Patrick	Dagon	2
5	(Myanmar) Yan Naing Oo	Shan United	2
5	(Myanmar) Zin Min Tun	Shan United	2
5	(Myanmar) David Htan	Shan United	2
5	(Myanmar) Aye Ko Ko Maung	Dagon	2
5	(Myanmar) Hlaing Bo Bo	Yadanarbon	2
5	(Myanmar) Ye Yint Aung (2)	Yadanarbon	2
5	(Myanmar) Sitt Mone	Zwegabin United	2
5	(Myanmar) Thiha	Magwe	2
5	(Myanmar) Htet Aung	Southern Myanmar	2
5	(Myanmar) Pyae Moe	Magwe	2
5	(Myanmar) Soe Lwin Lwin	Magwe	2
5	(Myanmar) Htet Zaw Tun	Sagaing United	2
5	(Ghana) Mark Sekyi	Hanthawady United	2
6	(Myanmar) Aung That Zaw	Rakhine United	1
6	(Myanmar) Chan Oo	Rakhine United	1
6	(Nigeria) Samuel	Rakhine United	1
6	(Nigeria) Emmanuel	Chinland	1
6	(Myanmar) Pyone Cho	Chinland	1
6	(Myanmar) Mong Teih Pau	Chinland	1
6	(Nigeria) Babatunde Aboidan	Chinland	1
6	(Myanmar) Nyein Min Oo	Chinland	1
6	(Myanmar) Htun Lin Aung	Chinland	1
6	(Myanmar) Yan Aung Kyaw	Yangon United	1
6	(Myanmar) Soe Min Naing	Yangon United	1
6	(Myanmar) Yan Lin Aung	Yangon United	1
6	(Japan) Kosuke Uchida	Yangon United	1
6	(Myanmar) Nan Wai Min	Yangon United	1
6	(Myanmar) Aung Kaung Mann	Ayeyawady United	1
6	(Ivory Coast) Kekere Moukailou	Ayeyawady United	1
6	(Myanmar) Kyaw Zin Lwin	Ayeyawady United	1
6	(Myanmar) Zaw Win	Ayeyawady United	1
6	(Myanmar) Yan Kyaw Htwe	Southern Myanmar	1
6	(Myanmar) Shine Thuya	Southern Myanmar	1
6	(Myanmar) Win Naing Soe	Yadanarbon	1
6	(Myanmar) Myint Thein Tun	Yadanarbon	1
6	(Myanmar) Bi Bi	Yadanarbon	1
6	(Myanmar) Thet Naing	Yadanarbon	1
6	(Myanmar) Arkar	Yadanarbon	1
6	(Myanmar) Thein Than Win	Yadanarbon	1
6	(Myanmar) Dway Ko Ko Chit	Shan United	1
6	(Myanmar) Zwe Thet Paing	Shan United	1
6	(Ivory Coast) Maximum	Shan United	1
6	(Myanmar) Aung Show Thar Maung	Shan United	1
6	(Myanmar) Hein Phyo Win	Shan United	1
6	(Myanmar) Ye Yint Tun	Shan United	1
6	(Myanmar) Shwe Ko	Shan United	1
6	(Myanmar) Aung Khine Tun	Dagon	1
6	(Myanmar) Nay Aung	Dagon	1
6	(Ghana) Samuel Kojo	Dagon	1
6	(Nigeria) Friday	Sagaing United	1
6	(Myanmar) Win Zin Oo	Sagaing United	1
6	(Myanmar) Aung Hlaing Win	Sagaing United	1
6	(Myanmar) Zon Moe Aung	Zwegabin United	1
6	(Myanmar) Maung Maung Win	Zwegabin United	1
6	(Myanmar) Aung Myo Thura	Hanthawady United	1
6	(Myanmar) Hein Htet Aung	Hanthawady United	1
6	(Myanmar) Aung Thura Zaw	Hanthawady United	1
6	(Myanmar) Nay Moe Naing	Magwe	1
6	(Myanmar) Kyaw Thu Tun	Magwe	1
6	(Myanmar) Soe Min Aung	Magwe	1

=== Clean sheets ===
As of 15 September 2019.

Rank	Player	Club	Clean sheets
1	(Myanmar) Kyaw Zin Htet	Yangon United	7
1	(Myanmar) Ko Ko Naing	Hanthawady United	7
1	(Myanmar) Kyaw Zin Phyo	Ayeyawady United	7
2	(Myanmar) Tay Zar Aung	Rakhine United	6
3	(Myanmar) Pyae Phyo Aung	Southern Myanmar	5
4	(Myanmar) Pyae Lyan Aung	Yadanarbon	4
4	(Myanmar) Sann Satt Naing	Yangon United	4
4	(Myanmar) Soe Arkar	Magwe	4
4	(Myanmar) Phone Thit Sar Min	Shan United	4
5	(Myanmar) A Zin Hmue	Sagaing United	3
5	(Myanmar) Yan Aung Lin	Dagon	3
6	(Myanmar) Myo Min Latt	Shan United	2
6	(Myanmar) Thiha Sithu	Shan United	2
6	(Myanmar) Nyein Min Oo	Chinland	2
6	(Myanmar) Naing Zayar Htun	Zwekapin United	2
7	(Myanmar) Chan Nyein Kyaw	Yadanarbon	1
7	(Myanmar) Wai Lin Aung	Yangon United	1
7	(Myanmar) Wai Yan Myo	Chinland	1
7	(Myanmar) Min Thu	Chinland	1
7	(Myanmar) Tun Aung Kyaw	Sagaing United	1

=== Hat-tricks ===
Player	For	Against	Result	Date
(Nigeria) Donald Bissa	Sagaing United	Southern Myanmar	6–0	26 January 2019
(Brazil) Maycon	Shan United	Zwekapi United	4–0	30 March 2019
(Myanmar) Win Naing Soe	Yadanarbon	Zwekapin United	4–0	6 April 2019
(Ghana) Mark Sekyi	Hanthawady United	Southern Myanmar	4–1	22 June 2019
(Liberia) Keith Martu Nah	Ayeyawady United	Yadanarbon	5–2	29 June 2019
(Nigeria) Emmanuel Uzochukwu	Shan United	Dagon	4–2	6 July 2019
(Myanmar) Win Naing Soe	Yadanarbon	Dagon	5–2	10 August 2019
(Nigeria) Raphael Success	Ayeyawady United	Hanthawady United	3–1	18 August 2019
(Myanmar) Win Naing Soe	Yadanarbon	Chinland	6–2	15 September 2019

== Awards ==
=== Monthly awards ===
Month	Coach of the Month		Player of the Month		Reference
Month	Coach	Club	Player	Club	Reference
January	(Myanmar) U Aung Kyaw Moe	Yadanarbon	(Myanmar) Win Naing Tun	Yadanarbon	
February & March	(Myanmar) U Ngwe Tun	Hanthawady United	(Myanmar) Hlaing Bo Bo	Yadanarbon	
April	(Myanmar) U Aung Kyaw Moe	Yadanarbon	(Guinea) Sylla Sekou	Yangon United	
May & June	(Myanmar) U Aung Khaing	Shan United	(Ghana) Abubakar Yakubu	Rakhine United	
July	(Myanmar) U Tin Maung Tun	Yangon United	(Myanmar) Zin Min Tun	Magwe	
August & September	(Myanmar) U Aung Naing	Shan United	(Myanmar) Nanda Kyaw	Shan United	

== See also ==
- 2019 MNL-2
- 2018–19 Myanmar Women's League
- 2019 General Aung San Shield
