= 2018 Myanmar National League =

Myanmar National League
- Season: 2018
- Dates: 11 January 2018 – 23 September 2018
- Champions: Yangon United
- Runner up: Shan United
- Relegated: G.F.A; Myawady
- Matches: 132
- Goals: 392 (2.97 per match)
- Top goalscorer: Joseph Mpande (18 goals)
- Best goalkeeper: Thiha Sithu (12 clean sheets)
- Biggest home win: Hanthawaddy United 9–0 Myawady (2 June 2018)
- Biggest away win: Ayeyawady United 0–4 Zwekapin United (15 September 2018)
- Highest scoring: 9 goals Hanthawaddy United 9–0 Myawady (2 June 2018)
- Longest unbeaten run: Yangon United (7 games)
- Longest winless run: Myawady (16 games)

The 2018 Myanmar National League, also known as the 2018 MPT Myanmar National League, is the 9th season of the Myanmar National League, the top Burmese professional league for association football clubs since its founding in 2009. The departure of the two clubs from the MNL-1 disrupted the previous season. More disruption came when Nay Pyi Taw and City Yangon withdrew from the competition towards the end of the 2017 season. At an emergency meeting of the MNL committee on September 12, Nay Pyi Taw was expelled from the league after its players complained of not having been paid since April. The expulsion came after players boycotted a game in early September. An unsuccessful coup attempt in Turkey in July last year created a crisis for City Yangon that forced its departure from the MNL. It was a big disappointment for the club, which won the 2017 MNL-2 championship to end the season undefeated. MNL-2 third-place winners Myawady FC were promoted along with runners-up Sagaing United to the 2018 Myanmar National League.

In the lead up to the 2018 season, the MNL signed a three-year sponsorship deal with the country's biggest TelCo MPT that will support funds for the Myanmar National League, MNL-2 and the youth competitions up until the 2020 season.

== 2018 Title Sponsor ==
Myanma Posts and Telecommunications signed 3 years contract with MNL. They help to develop Myanmar Football and Youth program.

2018 MNL Title Sponsor
- Type: mobile, voice and data
- Location: Myanmar
- Frequency: 450/800 MHz, 900/2100 MHz
- Established: 1884
- Current status: operational
- Website: www.mpt.com.mm

== Name Changes ==
Mahar United changed its name to Sagaing United.

== Teams ==
A total of 12 teams are competing in the 2018 season: 10 sides from the 2017 season and two promoted teams from the 2017 Myanmar National League 2.

=== Stadiums ===
Locations of the 2018 Myanmar National League

Club	Home City	Stadium	Capacity
Ayeyawady United	Pathein	Ayar Stadium	6,000
Hanthawaddy United	Bago	Grand Royal Stadium	4,000
Magwe	Magway	Magway Stadium*	3,000
Myawady FC	Nay Pyi Taw	Wunna Theikdi Stadium*	30,000
Rakhine United	Sittwe	Weithali Stadium	7,000
Sagaing United	Monywa	Monywa Stadium	4,000
Shan United	Taunggyi	Taunggyi Stadium	7,000
Southern Myanmar	Mawlamyaing	Ramanya Stadium	10,000
Yadanarbon	Mandalay	Mandalarthiri Stadium	30,000
Yangon United	Yangon	Yangon United Sports Complex	3,500
G.F.A	Chin	Hakha Stadium*	
Zwegapin United	Hpa-An	Aung Than Lwin Stadium*	3,000

(*) – not ready to play. MNL clubs that have not had their home stadia ready to host home matches currently use Aung San Stadium and Thuwunna Stadium in Yangon.

=== Managerial changes ===
Team	Outgoing manager	Manner of departure	Date of vacancy	Week	Table	Incoming manager
Yadanarbon	(Belgium) René Desaeyere	End of contract	1 October 2017	Pre-season		(Myanmar) Aung Kyaw Moe
Southern Myanmar	(Portugal) Fabiano Jose Costa Flora	End of Contract	13 November 2017	Pre-season		(Myanmar) Kyaw Min
Shan United	(Myanmar) Soe Myat Min	Resign	11 March 2018	Week 8	4	(Myanmar) Aung Kyaw Tun
Shan United	(Myanmar) Aung Kyaw Tun	Caretaker Manager	29 April 2018	Week 11	4	(North Macedonia) Marjan Sekulovski

=== Foreign players ===
The number of foreign players is restricted to four per MNL club. A team can use three foreign players on the field in each game, including a slot for a player from among AFC countries.

Other foreign players.
AFC quota players.
No foreign player registered.

The number of foreign players is restricted to five per T1 team. A team can use four foreign players on the field in each game, including at least one player from the AFC member countries (3+1).

Note :
(substituted off) : players who released during summer transfer window;
(substituted on) : players who registered during summer transfer window.
↔: players who have dual nationality by half-caste or naturalization.
→: players who left club after registered during second leg.

Club	Leg	Player 1	Player 2	Player 3	AFC player
Ayeyawady United	First	(Cameroon) Jocial Tchakounte	(Brazil) Cássio Magalhães	(Cameroon) Ella Edubat Patrick	
Ayeyawady United	Second	(Cameroon) Jocial Tchakounte	(Brazil) Cássio Magalhães	(Cameroon) Ella Edubat Patrick	
GFA	First	(Cameroon) Atanga Effa Kostka	(Nigeria) Omololu Emmanuel	(Nigeria) Anthony Ugochukwu (substituted off)	
GFA	Second	(Cameroon) Atanga Effa Kostka	(Nigeria) Omololu Emmanuel	(Nigeria) Jordan Nyako (substituted on)	
Hanthawaddy United	First	(Ghana) Mark Sekyi	(Uganda) Joseph Mpande	(Nigeria) Michael Falcon	
Hanthawaddy United	Second	(Ghana) Mark Sekyi	(Uganda) Joseph Mpande	(Nigeria) Michael Falcon	
Magwe	First				
Magwe	Second				
Myawady	First				
Myawady	Second				
Sagaing United	First	(Nigeria) Chukwuekweka Samuel (substituted off)	(Nigeria) Barnabas Friday	(Cameroon) Soulemanou Mandjombe	
Sagaing United	Second	(Ivory Coast) Bamba (substituted on)	(Nigeria) Barnabas Friday	(Cameroon) Soulemanou Mandjombe	
Shan United	First	(Nigeria) Christopher Chizoba	(Cameroon) William Nyakwe	(Ghana) Patrick Asare (substituted off)	(South Korea) Lee Han-kuk
Shan United	Second	(Nigeria) Christopher Chizoba	(Cameroon) William Nyakwe	(Serbia) Milan Svojić (substituted on)	(South Korea) Lee Han-kuk
Southern Myanmar	First	(Guinea) Alpha Oumar Barry	(Nigeria) Olajide Williams (substituted off)		
Southern Myanmar	Second	(Guinea) Alpha Oumar Barry	(Nigeria) Olajide Williams (substituted off)		
Rakhine United	First	(Nigeria) Sunday Mathew	(Togo) Agarawa	(Nigeria) Clifford	
Rakhine United	Second	(Nigeria) Sunday Mathew	(Togo) Agarawa	(Nigeria) Clifford	
Yadanarbon	First				
Yadanarbon	Second				
Yangon United	First	(Ivory Coast) Kekere Moukailou	(Guinea) Sylla Sekou	(Nigeria) Emmanuel Uzochukwu	(Japan) Kosuke Uchida
Yangon United	Second	(Ivory Coast) Kekere Moukailou	(Guinea) Sylla Sekou	(Nigeria) Emmanuel Uzochukwu	(Japan) Kosuke Uchida
Zwekapin United	First	(Portugal) Paulo Bunze (substituted off)	(Liberia) Sackie Doe	(Nigeria) Anderson West	(Japan) Ken Matsumoto
Zwekapin United	Second	(Colombia) Edison Fonseca (substituted on)	(Liberia) Sackie Doe	(Nigeria) Anderson West	(Japan) Ken Matsumoto

=== Personnel and sponsoring ===
Note: Flags indicate national team as has been defined under FIFA eligibility rules. Players may hold more than one non-FIFA nationality.

Team	Head coach	Captain	Kit manufacturer	Shirt sponsor
Ayeyawady United	(Myanmar) Shwe Shwe Aung	(Myanmar) Min Min Thu	(Thailand) Grand Sport	(Myanmar) AMI Insurance
G.F.A	(Myanmar) Thein Min Htut	(Cameroon) Effa Kostka	made by club	(Myanmar) Gospel for Asia
Hanthawaddy United	(Myanmar) Win Min Zaw	(Myanmar) Aung Zaw	(Thailand) FBT	none
Magwe	(Myanmar) Myo Ko Saya	(Myanmar) Kyaw Zin Phyo	(Thailand) Grand Sport	none
Myawady	(Myanmar) Ko Ko Oo	(Myanmar) Ye Wai Yan Soe	(Thailand) Pro//Sport	none
Rakhine United	(Myanmar) Soe Myat Kyaw	(Myanmar) Hla Aye Htwe	(Thailand) Pro//Sport	(Myanmar) UAB Bank
Sagaing United	(Myanmar) Kyi Win Zaw	(Myanmar) Toe Sat Naing	(Thailand) FBT	none
Shan United	(Myanmar) Thein Thiha Aung	(Myanmar) Thiha Sithu	(Thailand) Pro//Sport	(Myanmar) KBZ Bank
Southern Myanmar FC	(Myanmar) Pyae Phyo Saya	(Myanmar) Pyae Phyo Aung	(Thailand) Pro//Sport	(Myanmar) Yuzana Group
Yadanarbon	(Myanmar) Ko Ko Tun	(Myanmar) Ye Ko Oo	(Thailand) FBT	(Myanmar) Alpine
Yangon United	(Myanmar) Hlaing Kyaw Htet	(Myanmar) Yan Aung Kyaw	(Thailand) FBT	(Myanmar) AGD Bank
Zwekapin United	(Myanmar) Kyi Min Htun	(Myanmar) Naing Zayar Htun	made by club	(Myanmar) Htay Group

== Result ==
=== League table ===
Pos	Team	Pld	W	D	L	GF	GA	GD	Pts	Qualification or relegation
1	Yangon United	22	16	3	3	54	20	+34	51	Qualification for the AFC Champions League Preliminary Round 1 and Mekong Club Championship
2	Shan United	22	15	5	2	33	13	+20	50	Qualification for the AFC Cup Group Stage
3	Zwegapin United	22	12	4	6	30	21	+9	40	
4	Hanthawaddy United	22	11	3	8	36	23	+13	36	
5	Yadanarbon	22	9	7	6	37	30	+7	34	
6	Southern Myanmar United	22	8	6	8	31	30	+1	30	
7	Magwe	22	8	6	8	26	26	0	30	
8	Ayeyawady United	22	8	6	8	38	45	−7	30	
9	Rakhine United	22	8	4	10	34	30	+4	28	
10	Sagaing United	22	5	6	11	27	40	−13	21	
11	Gospel For Asia	22	5	5	12	24	40	−16	20	Relegation to MNL-2
12	Myawady	22	0	2	20	12	66	−54	2	Relegation to MNL-2

=== Positions by round ===
Leader and qualification to the 2019 AFC Champions League Preliminary round 2
Qualification to the 2019 AFC Cup Group Stage
Relegation to the 2019 National League 2

The table lists the positions of teams after each week of matches. In order to preserve chronological evolvements, any postponed matches are not included in the round at which they were originally scheduled, but added to the full round they were played immediately afterwards. For example, if a match is scheduled for matchday 13, but then postponed and played between days 16 and 17, it will be added to the standings for day 16.

Team ╲ Round	1	2	3	4	5	6	7	8	9	10	11	12	13	14	15	16	17	18	19	20	21	22
Ayeyawady United	12	11	10	10	6	8	9	8	9	8	6	8		9								
GFA	4	3	4	7	10	11	11	11	11	11	11	11		11	11	11						
Hanthawaddy United	11	5	7	11	7	5	5	5	5	3	4	5		5	5	6						
Myawady	9	12	12	12	12	12	12	12	12	12	12	12	12	12	12	12						
Rakhine United	5	9	8	6	9	10	7	6	7	6	8	7		6	6	7						
Sagaing United	10	8	11	8	11	9	10	10	10	10	10	10		10	10	10						
Magwe	7	7	5	4	4	4	3	2	2	2	2	2		3	3	4						
Shan United	6	4	3	3	2	2	4	4	3	4	3	3		2	2	2	2					
Southern Myanmar	3	6	9	5	8	6	6	8	8	7	9	9		7	7	3						
Yadanarbon	1	1	1	1	3	3	2	3	4	5	5	4		4	4	5						
Yangon United	2	2	2	2	1	1	1	1	1	1	1	1		1	1	1	1					
Zwekapin United	8	10	6	9	5	7	8	7	6	9	7	6		8	8	8	3					

Source: National League

=== Results by match played ===
Team \ Match played	1	2	3	4	5	6	7	8	9	10	11	12	13	14	15	16	17	18	19	20	21	22
Ayeyawady United	L	D	D	D	W	L	L	W	L	W	W	L	W	D	W	L	W	W	L	D	L	L
GFA	D	W	L	L	L	L	L	D	W	L	D	L	L	D	D	W	W	L	L	L	W	L
Hanthawaddy United	L	W	L	L	W	W	W	L	W	W	L	L	W	W	D	L	D	W	W	L	D	W
Myawady	D	L	L	L	L	D	L	L	L	L	L	L	L	L	L	L	L	L	L	L	L	L
Rakhine United	D	L	D	W	L	L	W	W	L	W	L	W	W	L	L	D	L	L	W	D	L	W
Sagaing United	D	L	L	W	L	D	W	L	D	L	D	D	L	L	D	L	W	L	W	L	L	L
Magwe	D	L	W	W	W	D	W	W	L	W	W	D	W	L	D	L	L	L	D	D	L	L
Shan United	D	W	W	D	W	W	L	D	W	L	W	W	D	W	W	W	D	W	W	W	W	W
Southern Myanmar	D	D	L	W	L	W	L	D	D	W	L	L	W	W	W	W	D	L	L	D	W	L
Yadanarbon	W	W	W	D	L	D	W	D	L	D	D	W	L	W	L	D	L	W	L	W	D	W
Yangon United	W	W	W	D	W	W	W	L	W	D	W	W	L	W	L	W	D	W	W	W	W	W
Zwekapin United	D	L	W	L	W	L	L	W	W	L	D	W	D	L	W	L	W	W	D	W	W	W

Source: National League
W = Win; D = Draw; L = Loss

== Matches ==
Fixtures and results of the Myanmar National League 2018 season.

=== Week 1 ===
2018-01-11	Sagaing United	0–0	Rakhine United	Monywa Stadium, Monywa
15:30 UTC+06:30

2018-01-12	Zwegabin United	0–0	Shan United	Thuwunna Stadium, Yangon
16:00 UTC+06:30

2018-01-13	Myawady	0–0	Magwe	Aung San Stadium, Yangon
16:00 UTC+06:30

2017-01-14	Hanthawaddy United	1–2	Yangon United	Grand Royal Stadium, Bago
15:30 UTC+06:30	Michael Falcon 66'		Kosuke Uchida 43'; Sekou Sylla 63'

2018-01-15	Southern Myanmar	1–1	GFA	Yamanya Stadium, Mawlamyine
15:30 UTC+06:30	Aung Moe 45+1'		Zaw Lin 76'

2018-01-15	Yadanarbon	5–2	Ayeyawady United	Mandalarthiri Stadium, Mandalay
16:00 UTC+06:30	Sithu Aung 8', 58', 83', 88' (pen.); Myat Kaung Khant 45'		Edubat Patrick 75', 85' (pen.)

=== Week 2 ===
2018-01-19	Magwe	2–3	Shan United	Thuwunna Stadium, Yangon
15:30 UTC+06:30	Aung Myint Tun 15'; Soe Lwin Lwin 84'		Christopher Chizoba 35', 52', 86'

2018-01-20	Yadanarbon	4–2	Rakhine United	Mandalar Thiri Stadium, Mandalay
16:00 UTC+06:30	Myat Kaung Khant 18'; Hlaing Bo Bo 59'; Myo Ko Tun 65'; Sithu Aung 90+1' (pen.)		Zaw Zaw Naing 10'; Sunday Mathew 58'

2018-01-20	Yangon United	2–0	Zwekapin United	YUSC, Yangon
15:30 UTC+06:30	Sekou Sylla 84'; Kyi Lin 90+3'

2018-01-20	Myawady	0–3	GFA	Aung San Stadium, Yangon
15:30 UTC+06:30			Anthony 19'; Soe Min Tun 22', 35'

2018-01-21	Hanthawaddy United	2–1	Sagaing United	Grand Royal Stadium, bago
15:30 UTC+06:30	Yan Naing Aung 79'; Joseph Mpande 84'		Samuel 72'

2018-01-21	Ayeyawady United	2–2	Southern Myanmar	Ayar Stadium, Pathein
15:30 UTC+06:30	Cassio 27'; Adubat 51'		William 29'; 30' (O.G)

=== Week 3 ===
2018-01-27	Ayeyawady United	1–1	Rakhine United	Ayar Stadium, Pathein
15:30 UTC+06:30	Aung Kaung Mann 22'		Zaw Win 56'

2018-01-27	Southern Myanmar	0–2	Magwe	Mawlamyine Stadium, Mawlamyine
15:30 UTC+06:30			Maung Maung Soe 20'; Aung Myint Tun 84'

2018-01-27	GFA	0–2	Yadanarbon	Aung San Stadium, Yangon
15:30 UTC+06:30			Thet Naing 44'; Myat Kaung Khant 90+2'

2018-01-28	Sagaing United	1–3	Yangon United	Monywa Stadium, Monywa
15:30 UTC+06:30	Zaw Zin Oo 58' (pen.)		Maung Maung Lwin 25', 45'; Kyi Lin 68'

2018-01-28	Shan United	2–1	Hanthawaddy United	Taunggyi Stadium, Taunggyi
15:30 UTC+06:30	Dway Ko Ko Chit 7'; Yan Naing Oo 58'		Mark Sekyi 90+2'

2018-01-28	Zwekapin United	1–0	Myawady	Aung San Stadium, Yangon
15:30 UTC+06:30	Than Htet Aung 30'

=== Week 4 ===
2018-02-03	Ayeyawady United	2–2	Yangon United	Ayar Stadium, Pathein
15:30 UTC+06:30	Aung Hein Kyaw 15'; Cassio 58'		Sylla Sekou 17'; Edubat 27' (O.G)

2018-02-03	Zwekapin United	1–2	Rakhine United	Thuwunna Stadium, Yangon
16:00 UTC+06:30	Matsumoto Ken 34'		Sunday Mathew 50'; Ti Nyein Minn 90+3'

2018-02-03	Sagaing United	2–1	GFA	Monywa Stadium, Monywa
15:30 UTC+06:30	Wai Phyo Thu 53'; Thiha Thu 68'		Than Hteik Aung 12'

2018-02-04	Shan United	0–0	Yadanarbon	Taunggyi stadium, Taunggyi
15:30 UTC+06:30

2018-02-04	Southern Myanmar	4–0	Myawady	Mawlamyine Stadium, Mawlamyine
15:30 UTC+06:30	Ye Htet Aung 42'; Kaung Sithu 52'; Alpha Barry 66'; Wai Phyo Lwin 72'

2018-02-04	Magwe	2–0	Hanthawaddy United	Thuwunna Stadium, Yangon
16:00 UTC+06:30	Maung Maung Soe 57'; Aung Myint Tun 58'

=== Week 5 ===
2018-02-09	Yangon United	3–1	Rakhine United	YUSC, Yangon
15:30 UTC+06:30	Sylla Sekou 8', 41'; Maung Maung Lwin 65'		Sunday Matew 67'

2018-02-09	Shan United	1–0	Sagaing United	Taunggyi Stadium, Taunggyi
15:30 UTC+06:30	Soe Min Oo 71'

2018-02-10	Myawady	1–2	Hanthawaddy United	Aung San Stadium, Yangon
16:00 UTC+06:30	Kaung Sithu 56' (pen.)		Joseph Mpande 14', 22'

2017-02-10	Zwekapin United	2–0	Southern Myanmar	Thuwunna stadium, Yangon
16:00 UTC+06:30	Cezar 45'; Yan Kyaw Htwe 77'

2018-02-10	Yadanarbon	0–1	Magwe	Mandalarthiri Stadium, Mandalay
16:00 UTC+06:30			Maung Maung Soe 90+3'

2018-02-11	GFA	0–3	Ayeyawady United	Thuwunna Stadium, Yangon
16:00 UTC+06:30			Patrick Edubat 27', 28'; Min Min Thu 37'

=== Week 6 ===
2018-02-17	Myawady	2–2	Yadanarbon	Thuwunna Stadium, Yangon
16:00 UTC+06:30	Kaung Sithu 39'; Ye Wai Yan Soe 75'		Thet Naing 64'; Win Naing Soe 77'

2018-02-17	Southern Myanmar	1–0	Rakhine United	Mawlamyine Stadium, Mawlamyine
15:30 UTC+06:30	Kaung Sithu 66'

2018-02-17	Hanthawaddy United	1–0	Zwekapin United	Grand Royal Stadium, Bago
15:30 UTC+06:30	Kyaw Zaya 37'

2017-02-18	Ayeyawady United	0–1	Shan United	Ayar stadium, Pathein
15:30 UTC+06:30			Christopher Chizoba 29'

2018-02-18	Yangon United	6–0	GFA	YUSC Stadium, Yangon
15:30 UTC+06:30	Aee Soe 28', 83'; Emmanuel 53', 61'; Kosuke Uchida 60'; Kyi Lin 73'

2018-02-18	Magwe	1–1	Sagaing United	Aung San Stadium, Yangon
15:30 UTC+06:30	Nanda Kyaw 74'		Zaw Zin Oo 67'

=== Week 7 ===
2018-02-23	Yangon United	1–0	Shan United	Y.U.S.C Stadium, Yangon
15:30 UTC+06:30	Aee Soe 21'

2018-02-24	Rakhine United	3–0	GFA	Wai Thar Li Stadium, Sittwe
15:30 UTC+06:30	Sunday Mathew 49', 90+3'; Sithu Than Soe 63'

2017-02-24	Magwe	2–1	Ayeyawady United	Thuwunna stadium, Yangon
16:00 UTC+06:30	Aung Myint Tun 54'; Soe Lwin Lwin 60'		Cassio 75'

2018-02-25	Yadanarbon	1–0	Zwekapin United	Mandalarthiri Stadium, Mandalay
16:00 UTC+06:30	Sithu Aung 37'

2018-02-25	Hanthawaddy United	1–0	Southern Myanmar	Grand Royal Stadium, Bago
15:30 UTC+06:30	Yan Naing Aung 67'

2018-03-11	Myawady	1–2	Sagaing United	Aung San Stadium, Yangon
15:30 UTC+06:30	Thet Wai Moe 9'		Friday 15'; Thiha Zaw 61'

=== Week 8 ===
2018-03-03	Magwe	1–0	Yangon United	Thuwunna Stadium, Yangon
16:00 UTC+06:30	Cho Tun 86'

2018-03-03	Southern Myanmar	1–1	Yadanarbon	Mawlamyine Stadium, Mawlamyine
15:30 UTC+06:30	Yan Naing Htwe 20'		Shine Thuya 10'

2017-03-04	Rakhine United	2–0	Hanthawaddy United	Wai Thar Li stadium, Sittwe
15:30 UTC+06:30	Komi Biova 47'; Sithu Than Soe 65'

2018-03-04	Zwekapin United	3–2	Sagaing United	Aung San Stadium, Yangon
16:00 UTC+06:30	Sai Min Tun 31'; Zin Min Tun 33'; Paulo Bunze 42'		Thet Naung Htwe 10'; Barnas Friday 76'

2018-03-07	Ayeyawady United	4–1	Myawady	Ayar Stadium, Pathein
15:30 UTC+06:30	Patrick Edubat 15', 59'; Yan Pai Soe 45'; Aye Ko Ko Maung 67'		Wai yan Oo 54'

2018-05-02	GFA	1–1	Shan United	Thuwunna Stadium, Yangon
15:30 UTC+06:30	Soe Min Tun 24'		Christpher Chizoba 61'

=== Week 9 ===
2018-03-30	GFAS	1–0	Magwe	Thuwunna Stadium, Yangon
16:00 UTC+06:30	Mung Theih Pau 81'

2018-03-31	Shan United	2–0	Rakhine United	Taunggyi Stadium, Taunggyi
15:30 UTC+06:30	Zin Min Tun 41'; Dway Ko Ko Chit 60'

2017-03-31	Myawady	0–1	Yangon United	Thuwunna stadium, Yangon
15:30 UTC+06:30			Aung Thu 76' (o.g)

2018-03-31	Sagaing United	0–0	Southern Myanmar	Monywa Stadium, Monywa
16:00 UTC+06:30

2018-04-01	Zwekapin United	3–0	Ayeyawady United	Aung San Stadium, Yangon
16:00 UTC+06:30	Than Htet Aung 65'; Sai Min Tun 72'; Yan Kyaw Htwe 90+2'

2018-04-01	Yadanarbon	1–2	Hanthawaddy United	Mandalarthiri Stadium, Mandalay
16:00 UTC+06:30	Sithu Aung 79'		Htet Lin Lin 58'; Joseph 86'

=== Week 10 ===
2018-04-06	Southern Myanmar	3–2	Shan United	Thuwunna Stadium, Yangon
16:00 UTC+06:30	Kaung Sithu 38'; Berry 50'; Aung Moe 76'		Dway Ko Ko Chit 40'; Htike Htike Aung 81'

2018-04-07	Hanthawaddy United	1–0	GFA	Grand Royal Stadium, Bago
15:30 UTC+06:30	Joseph Mpande 4'

2017-04-07	Yangon United	3–3	Yadanarbon	Thuwunna Stadium, Yangon
16:00 UTC+06:30	Kyaw Zin Oo 41'; Aee Soe 60'; Sylla Sekou 75'		Ye Ko Oo 9', 63'; Myat Kaung Khant 61'

2018-04-08	Ayeyawady United	5–2	Sagaing United	Ayar Stadium, Pathein
15:30 UTC+06:30	Thiha Zaw 26', 34'; Patrick 47'; Jean Paul 59'; Naing Lin Tun 64'		Thiha Thu 53'; Kaung Zaw Htwe 90+1'

2018-04-08	Rakhine United	2–1	Myawady	Waithali Stadium, Sittwe
15:30 UTC+06:30	Sunday Mathew 18'; Kaung Myat Kyaw 32'		Ye Wai Yan Soe 82'

2018-04-08	Magwe	1–0	Zwekapin United	Thuwunna Stadium, Yangon
16:00 UTC+06:30	Naing Naing Kyaw 18'

=== Week 11 ===
2018-04-28	Ayeyawady United	1–0	Hanthawaddy United	Ayar Stadium, Pathein
15:30 UTC+06:30	Patrick Edubat 25'

2018-04-28	Sagaing United	2–2	Yadanarbon	Monywa Stadium, Monywa
15:30 UTC+06:30	Friday 38'; Kaung Zaw Htwe 60'		Win Naing Soe 15'; Myo Zaw Oo 61'

2017-04-28	Zwekapin United	1–1	GFA	Thuwunna Stadium, Yangon
16:00 UTC+06:30	Maung Maung Win 17'		Omololu Emmanuel 50'

2018-04-29	Myawady	0–3	Shan United	Thuwunna Stadium, Yangon
16:00 UTC+06:30			Zin Min Tun 66'; Zaw Lin 71'; Soe Min Oo 90+2'

2018-04-30	Southern Myanmar	1–4	Yangon United	Mawlamyine Stadium, Mawlamyine
15:30 UTC+06:30	Soe Myat Thu 14' (pen.)		Emmanuel 4'; Sylla Sekou 26', 51', 64'

2018-05-13	Rakhine United	2–5	Magwe	Waithali Stadium, Sittwe
15:30 UTC+06:30	Kaung Myat Kyaw 57'; Clifford 60'		Aung Myint Tun 15', 25', 38'; Soe Min Aung 74'; Zayar Naing 75'

=== Week 12 ===
2018-05-19	Rakhinie United	2–1	Southern Myanmar	Wai Thar Li Stadium, Sittwe
15:30 UTC+06:30	Ti Nyein Minn 78'; Sunday Mathew 82'		Htoo Htoo Aung 84'

2018-05-19	Sagaing United	1–1	Magwe	Monywa Stadium, Monywa
15:30 UTC+06:30	Bamba 31'		Cho Tun 68'

2017-05-19	Zwekapin United	3–1	Hanthawaddy United	Thuwunna Stadium, Yangon
16:00 UTC+06:30	Than Htet Aung 39'; Zon Moe Aung 40'; Yan Kyaw Htwe 88'		Joseph Mpande 44'

2018-05-20	Shan United	2–0	Ayeyawady United	Taunggyi Stadium, Taunggyi
15:30 UTC+06:30	David Htan 13'; Zin Min Tun 25'

2018-05-20	GFA	0–4	Yangon United	Thuwunna Stadium, Yangon
15:30 UTC+06:30			Kosuke Uchida 18', 45'; Emmanuel 35'; Sekou Sylla 61'

2018-05-20	Yadanarbon	7–0	Myawady	Mandalarthiri Stadium, Mandalay
16:00 UTC+06:30	Win Naing Soe 2', 39', 64'; Hlaing Bo Bo 11'; Myat Kaung Khant 31'; Thet Naing 54'; Shine Thuya 84'

=== Week 13 ===
2018-05-26	Rakhinie United	1–0	Sagaing United	Wai Thar Li Stadium, Sittwe
15:30 UTC+06:30	Agarawa 90+3'

2018-05-26	GFA	1–2	Southern Myanmar	Thuwunna Stadium, Yangon
16:00 UTC+06:30	Mung Theih Pau 74'		Nan Min Aung 33'; Kaung Sithu 63'

2018-07-19	Magwe	3–1	Myawady	Thuwunna Stadium, Yangon
16:00 UTC+06:30	Nanda Kyaw 24'; Aung Myint Tun 45'; Kyaw Zin Lwin 56'		Ye Wai Yan Soe 51'

2018-07-21	Shan United	1–1	Zwekapin United	Taunggyi Stadium, Taunggyi
15:30 UTC+06:30	Dway Ko Ko Chit 90+3'		Than Htet Aung 90+5'

2018-07-21	Ayeyawady United	2–1	Yadanarbon	Ayar stadium, Pathein
15:30 UTC+06:30	Thiha Zaw 37'; Patrick 90+1'		Zaw Ye Tun 42'

2018-07-22	Yangon United	0–1	Hanthawaddy United	Thuwunna Stadium, Yangon
15:30 UTC+06:30			Joseph Mpande 41'

=== Week 14 ===
2018-06-02	Hanthawaddy United	9–0	Myawady	Grand Royal Stadium, Bago
15:30 UTC+06:30	Shwe Hlaing Win 6', 15'; Paing Moe Wai 11'; Joseph Mpande 20', 40', 59'; Sekyi Mark 48', 57'; Kyaw Zeya 64'

2018-06-02	Magwe	0–2	Yadanarbon	Thuwunna Stadium, Yangon
16:00 UTC+06:30			Sithu Aung 16', 27'

2018-06-02	Rakhine United	2–3	Yangon United	Waithali Stadium, Sittwe
15:30 UTC+06:30	Sunday Mathew 29'; Sithu Than Soe 71'		Sylla Sekou 65'; Yan Lin Aung 67'; Maung Maung Lwin 70'

2018-06-03	Southern Myanmar	3–1	Zwekapin United	Mawlamyine Stadium, Mawlamyine
15:30 UTC+06:30	Htoo Htoo Aung 13'; Kaung Sithu 29', 65'		Edison Fonseca 57'

2018-06-03	Sagaing United	0–2	Shan United	Monywa Stadium, Monywa
15:30 UTC+06:30			Christopher Chizoba 6'; Yan Naing Oo 50'

2018-06-03	Ayeyawady United	1–1	GFA	Ayar Stadium, Pathein
15:30 UTC+06:30	Yan Paing Soe 80'		Effa Kostka 37'

=== Week 15 ===
2018-06-09	GFA	2–2	Sagaing United	Thuwunna Stadium, Yangon
16:00 UTC+06:30	Mung Theih Pau 63', 79'		Friday 59', 76'

2018-06-09	Rakhine United	1–2	Zwekapin United	Waithali Stadium, Sittwe
15:30 UTC+06:30	Clifford 86'		Than Htet Aung 67', 88'

2018-06-10	Hanthawaddy United	1–1	Magwe	Grand Royal Stadium, Bago
15:30 UTC+06:30	Joseph Mpande 2'		Maung Maung Soe 54'

2018-06-10	Yangon United	2–3	Ayeyawdy United	Aung San Stadium, Yangon
15:30 UTC+06:30	Sylla Sekou 36'; Maung Maung Lwin 38'		Thiha Zaw 67'; Cássio Magalhães 75'; Edubat Patrick 90'

2018-06-10	Myawady	0–3	Southern Myanmar	Thuwunna Stadium, Yangon
16:00 UTC+06:30			Aung Moe 36'; Kaung Sithu 45+1'; Htoo Htoo Aung 48'

2018-06-10	Yadanarbon	2–3	Shan United	Mandalar Thiri Stadium, Mandalay
16:00 UTC+06:30	Win Naing Soe 59'; Win Naing Tun 73'		Dway Ko Ko Chit 47', 60'; Christopher Chizoba 63'

=== Week 16 ===
2018-06-16	Shan United	2–0	Magwe	Taunggyi Stadium, Taunggyi
15:30 UTC+06:30	William 18'; Christopher Chizoba 52' (pen.)

2018-06-16	Rakhine United	1–1	Yadanarbon	Waithali Stadium, Sittwe
15:30 UTC+06:30	Kaung Myat Kyaw 90'		Hlaing Bo Bo 85'

2018-06-16	GFA	4–0	Myawady	Thuwunna Stadium, Yangon
16:00 UTC+06:30	Pyone Cho 8', 12', 44'; Mung Theih Pau 90'

2018-06-17	Southern Myanmar	4–2	Ayeyawdy United	Mawlamyine Stadium, Mawlamyine
15:30 UTC+06:30	Wai Phyo Lwin 3'; Alpha Berry 69', 71'; Yan Naing Htwe 90+4'		Aung Kyaw Naing 21', 74'

2018-06-17	Zwekapin United	0–2	Yangon United	Thuwunna Stadium, Yangon
16:00 UTC+06:30			Maung Maung Lwin 31'; Aee Soe 84'

2018-06-17	Sagaing United	2–1	Hanthawaddy United	Monywar Stadium, Monywar
15:30 UTC+06:30	Wai Phyo Thu 8'; Htet Zaw Tun 31'		Mark Sekyi 11'

=== Week 17 ===
2018-06-23	Shan United	0–0	Yangon United	Taunggyi Stadium, Taunggyi
15:30 UTC+06:30				Referee: Thant Zin Oo

2018-06-23	Ayeyawady United	4–1	Magwe	Ayar Stadium, Pathein
15:30 UTC+06:30	Patrick 28', 37', 62'; Yan Pai Soe 68'		Nanda Kyaw 16'

2018-06-23	Zwekapin United	2–1	Yadanarbon	Thuwunna Stadium, Yangon
16:00 UTC+06:30	Than Htet Aung 60', 73'		Hlaing Bo Bo 45+1'

2018-06-24	GFA	3–1	Rakhine United	Thuwunna Stadium, Yangon
16:00 UTC+06:30	Pyone Cho 9'; Emmanuel 40', 45'		Sunday Mathew 88' (pen.)

2018-06-24	Sagaing United	3–1	Myawady	Monywa Stadium, Monywa
15:30 UTC+06:30	Friday 9', 55'; Bamba 50'		Ye Htet Aung 83'

2018-06-24	Southern Myanmar	0–0	Hanthawaddy United	Mawlamyine Stadium, Mawlamyine
15:30 UTC+06:30

=== Week 18 ===
2018-06-30	Hanthawaddy United	2–1	Rakhine United	Grand Royal Stadium, Bago
15:30 UTC+06:30	Joseph Mpande 32', 60'		Sunday Mathew 89'

2018-06-30	Myawady	0–2	Ayeyawady United	Thuwunna Stadium, Yangon
16:00 UTC+06:30			Thiha Zaw 30'; Patrick 36'

2018-07-01	Yangon United	1–0	Magwe	Thuwunna Stadium, Yangon
15:30 UTC+06:30	Thein Zaw 90'

2018-07-01	Shan United	1–0	GFA	Taunggyi Stadium, Taunggyi
15:30 UTC+06:30	Yan Naing Oo 86'

2018-07-01	Yadanarbon	3–1	Southern Myanmar	Mandalar Thiri Stadium, Mandalay
15:30 UTC+06:30	Win Naing Soe 4'; Ye Yint Tun 16'; Ye Ko Oo 67'		Alpha Berry 64'

2018-07-01	Sagaing United	0–1	Zwekapin United	Monywa Stadium, Monywa
15:30 UTC+06:30			Mandjombe 45+1' (o.g)

=== Week 19 ===
2018-07-06	Myawady	2–6	Rakhine United	Thuwunna Stadium, Yangon
16:00 UTC+06:30	Aung Kyaw Thu 17'; Aung Thu 20'		Ti Nyein Minn 21', 64', 82'; Sunday Mathew 25', 54', 67'	Referee: Aung Thu

2018-07-07	Sagaing United	4–1	Ayeyawady United	Monywa Stadium, Monywa
15:30 UTC+06:30	Bamba 36', 45+1', 90+2'; Aung Hlaing Win 63'		Aung Hein Kyaw 88'

2018-07-07	Zwekapin United	1–1	Magwe	Thuwunna Stadium, Yangon
16:00 UTC+06:30	Sis Mone 83'		Soe Min Aung 15'

2018-07-08	Shan United	1–0	Southern Myanmar	Taunggyi Stadium, Taunggyi
15:30 UTC+06:30	Dway Ko Ko Chit 60'

2018-07-08	Yadanarbon	1–2	Yangon United	Mandalarthiri Stadium, Mandalay
16:00 UTC+06:30	Ye Yint Tun 2'		Thein Zaw 58'; Emmanuel 90+1'

2018-07-08	GFA	0–2	Hanthawaddy United	Thuwunna Stadium, Yangon
16:00 UTC+06:30			Joseph Mpande 13'; Mark Sekyi 46'

=== Week 20 ===
2018-07-13	Rakhine United	2–2	Ayeyawady United	Thuwunna Stadium, Yangon
16:00 UTC+06:30	Thet Shine Naung 71'; Ti Nyein Minn 79'		Patrick 25'; Kyaw Myint Win 63'	Referee: Aung Thu

2018-07-14	Magwe	1–1	Southern Myanmar	Thuwunna Stadium, Yangon
15:30 UTC+06:30	Aung Moe 81'		Aung Myint Tun 90+4'

2018-07-14	Hanthawaddy United	1–2	Shan United	Thuwunna Stadium, Yangon
16:00 UTC+06:30	Mark Sekyi 59'		David Htan 28'; Christopher Chizoba 40'

2018-07-15	Yangon United	5–2	Sagaing United	Thuwunna Stadium, Yangon
15:30 UTC+06:30	Sylla Sekou 26', 28'; Maung Maung Lwin 34', 75'; Emmanuel 44'		Bamba 60'; Myo Min Phyo 72'

2018-07-15	Myawady	0–1	Zwekapin United	Aung San Stadium, Yangon
16:00 UTC+06:30			Yan Kyaw Htwe 9'

2018-07-15	Yadanarbon	3–2	GFA	Mandalarthiri Stadium, Mandalay
16:00 UTC+06:30	Sithu Aung 6'; Win Naing Soe 45'; Emmanuel 90' (o.g)		Jordan 54'; Emmanuel 78'

=== Week 21 ===
2018-09-14	Hanthawaddy United	2–2	Yadanarbon	Grand Royal Stadium, Bago
16:00 UTC+06:30	Joseph Mpande 44', 90+1'		Ye Ko Oo 23' (pen.); Win Naing Soe 61'

2018-09-14	Rakhine United	0–2	Shan United	Thuwunna Stadium, Yangon
16:00 UTC+06:30			William 4'; Lee Han-kuk 68'

2018-09-14	Yangon United	4–1	Myawady	YUSC Stadium, Yangon
16:00 UTC+06:30	Sekou Sylla 1', 4' (pen.), 71'; Aung Kyaw Thu 6' (o.g)		Ye Wai Yan Soe 41'

2018-09-15	Magwe	1–2	GFA	Thuwunna Stadium, Yangon
16:00 UTC+06:30	Aung Myint Tun 14'		Emmanuel 3'; Thawng Lian Thang 90+3'

2018-09-15	Ayeyawady United	0–4	Zwekapin United	Ayar Stadium, Pathein
16:00 UTC+06:30			Yan Kyaw Htwe 55'; Ken Matsumoto 60'; Sai Min Tun 62' (pen.); Sitt Mone 90'

2018-09-16	Southern Myanmar	3–0	Sagaing United	Mawlamyine Stadium, Mawlamyine
15:30 UTC+06:30	Aung Moe 52'; Soe Kyaw Thu 65'; Thet Paing Soe 79'

=== Week 22 ===
2018-09-22	GFA	1–3	Zwekapin United	Thuwunna Stadium, Yangon
16:00 UTC+06:30	Than Htike Aung 58'		Than Htet Aung 37', 70'; Sackie Doe 45+1'

2018-09-23	Hanthawaddy United	5–0	Ayeyawady United	Grand Royal Stadium, Bago
15:30 UTC+06:30	Henery 3'; Joseph Mpande 35', 42', 83'; Mark Sekyi 76'

2018-09-23	Yangon United	4–0	Southern Myanmar	YUSC Stadium, Yangon
15:30 UTC+06:30	Maung Maung Lwin 29'; Kyaw Zin Oo 44', 61'; Soe Min Naing 77'

2018-09-23	Shan United	2–1	Myawady	Taunggyi Stadium, Taunggyi
15:30 UTC+06:30	Zaw Lin 56'; Nay Lin Tun 90+1'		Thet Paing Ko 25'

2018-09-23	Magwe	0–2	Rakhine United	Thuwunna Stadium, Yangon
16:00 UTC+06:30			Sunday 62'; Ti Nyein Minn 90+1'

2018-09-23	Yadanarbon	3–0	Sagaing United	Mandalar Thiri Stadium, Mandalay
16:00 UTC+06:30	Myat Kaung Khant 38', 48'; Win Naing Soe 55'

== Season statistics ==
=== Top scorers ===
As of 23 September 2018.

Rank	Player	Club	Goals
1	(Uganda) Joseph Mpande	Hanthawaddy United	18
2	(Guinea) Sylla Sekou	Yangon United	17
3	(Cameroon) Edubat Patrick	Ayeyawady United	16
4	(Nigeria) Sunday Mathew	Rakhine United	14
5	(Myanmar) Win Naing Soe	Yadanarbon	11
5	(Myanmar) Sithu Aung	Yadanarbon	10
5	(Myanmar) Aung Myint Tun	Magwe	10
5	(Myanmar) Than Htet Aung	Zwekapin United	10
9	(Nigeria) Christopher Chizoba	Shan United	9
9	(Myanmar) Maung Maung Lwin	Yangon United	9
11	(Myanmar) Kaung Sithu	Southern Myanmar	7
11	(Nigeria) Barnas Friday	Sagaing United	7
11	(Myanmar) Dway Ko Ko Chit	Shan United	7
11	(Myanmar) Ti Nyein Minn	Rakhine United	7
11	(Myanmar) Myat Kaung Khant	Yadanarbon	7
14	(Myanmar) Aung Moe	Southern Myanmar	6
16	(Myanmar) Mung Theih Pau	GFA	5
16	(Myanmar) Aee Soe	Yangon United	5
16	(Guinea) Alpha Barry	Southern Myanmar	5
16	(Nigeria) Emmanuel Uzochukwu	Yangon United	5
16	(Myanmar) Thiha Zaw	Ayeyawady United	5
16	(Myanmar) Ye Ko Oo	Yadanarbon	5
16	(Myanmar) Yan Kyaw Htwe	Zwekapin United	5
24	(Myanmar) Maung Maung Soe	Magwe	4
24	(Japan) Kosuke Uchida	Yangon United	4
24	(Myanmar) Pyone Cho	GFA	4
27	(Myanmar) Kyi Lin	Yangon United	3
27	(Myanmar) Soe Min Oo	Shan United	3
27	(Myanmar) Zin Min Tun	Shan United	3
27	(Myanmar) Thet Naing	Yadanarbon	3
27	(Myanmar) Sithu Than Soe	Rakhine United	3
27	(Myanmar) Sai Min Tun	Zwekapin United	3
33	(Myanmar) Soe Min Tun	GFA	2
33	(Myanmar) Soe Lwin Lwin	Magwe	2
33	(Myanmar) Zaw Zin Oo	Sagaing United	2
33	(Myanmar) Kaung Sithu	Myawady	2
33	(Myanmar) Yan Naing Aung	Hanthawaddy United	2
33	(Myanmar) Aung Kyaw Naing	Ayeyawady United	2
33	(Myanmar) Kyaw Zin Oo	Yangon United	2

=== Hat-tricks ===
Player	For	Against	Result	Date
(Myanmar) Sithu Aung	Yadanarbon	Ayeyawady United	5–2	15 January 2018
(Nigeria) Christopher Chizoba	Shan United	Rakhine United	3–2	19 January 2018
(Guinea) Sylla Sekou	Yangon United	Southern Myanmar	4–1	30 April 2018
(Myanmar) Aung Myint Tun	Magwe	Rakhine United	5–2	13 May 2018
(Myanmar) Win Naing Soe	Yadanarbon	Myawady	7–0	20 May 2018
(Uganda) Joseph Mpande	Hanthawaddy United	Myawady	9–0	2 June 2018
(Myanmar) Pyone Cho	GFA	Myawady	4–0	16 June 2018
(Cameroon) Edubat Patrick	Ayeyawady United	Magwe	4–1	23 June 2018
(Nigeria) Sunday Mathew	Rakhine United	Myawady	6–2	6 July 2018
(Myanmar) Ti Nyein Minn	Rakhine United	Myawady	6–2	6 July 2018
(Ivory Coast) Bamba	Sagaing United	Ayeyawady United	4–1	7 July 2018
(Guinea) Sylla Sekou	Yangon United	Myawady	4–1	14 September 2018
(Uganda) Joseph Mpande	Hanthawaddy United	Ayeyawady United	5–0	23 September 2018

=== Clean sheets ===
As of 23 September 2018.

Rank	Player	Club	Clean sheets
1	(Myanmar) Thiha Sithu	Shan United	12
2	(Myanmar) Kyaw Zin Htet	Yangon United	9
3	(Myanmar) Ko Ko Naing	Hanthawaddy United	7
4	(Myanmar) Naing Zayar Htun	Zwekapin United	6
4	(Myanmar) Pyae Phyo Aung	Southern Myanmar	6
5	(Myanmar) Kyaw Zin Phyo	Magwe	5
5	(Myanmar) Chan Nyein Kyaw	Yadanarbon	5
5	(Myanmar) Soe Arkar	Rakhine United	5
9	(Myanmar) Vanlal Hruala	Ayeyawady United	3
9	(Myanmar) Nyein Min Oo	GFA	3
11	(Myanmar) Sann Satt Naing	Yangon United	2
11	(Myanmar) A Zin Hmue	Sagaing United	2
13	(Myanmar) Tun Nanda Oo	Myawady	1
13	(Myanmar) Myo Min Latt	Shan United	1

== Awards ==
=== Monthly awards ===
Month	Coach of the Month		Player of the Month		Reference
Month	Coach	Club	Player	Club	Reference
January	(Myanmar) Aung Kyaw Moe	Yadanarbon	(Myanmar) Sithu Aung	Yadanarbon	
February	(Myanmar) Myo Min Tun	Yangon United	(Myanmar) Maung Maung Lwin	Yangon United	
March & April	(Myanmar) Aung Zaw Myo	Magwe	(Myanmar) Than Htet Aung	Zwekapin United	
May & June	(North Macedonia) Marjan Sekulovski	Shan United	(Myanmar) Than Htet Aung	Zwekapin United	
July	(Myanmar) Mr. Ngwe Tun	Hanthawaddy United	(Myanmar) Thiha Zaw	Ayeyawady United	

== See also ==
- 2018 National League 2
- 2017-18 Myanmar Women's League
