= 2018 General Aung San Shield =

2018 Bogyoke Aung San Shield
MFF Cup

Tournament details
- Country: Myanmar
- City: Yangon
- Venue: Bogyoke Aung San Stadium
- Dates: 12 May 2018 – 30 September 2018
- Teams: 19

Final positions
- Champions: Yangon United (2nd title)
- Runners-up: Hanthawaddy United

Tournament statistics
- Matches played: 18
- Goals scored: 61 (3.39 per match)
- Top goal scorer: Maung Maung Soe(4 goals)

The 2018 General Aung San Shield (Burmese: Bogyoke Aung San Shield) was the fourth season of Myanmar knockout football competition. The tournament is organized by the Myanmar Football Federation. It is the league cup competition started in 2018 Myanmar football season. This cup succeeded the Myanmar Football Federation Cup. MFF has changed the cup competition style as follows.

In the first round, ten clubs competing in 2018 MNL-2 and two clubs which were promoted to 2018 MNL, twelve teams in total, will be involved playing at a neutral ground with six teams emerged as winners. In the second round, ten clubs competing in 2017 MNL and the six winners from the first round, sixteen teams in total, will be involved playing at a neutral ground with eight teams emerged as winners. The quarter-finals will still be played as one-legged matches but the semi-final will be competed as two-legged (Home and Away) matches. Shan United were the defending champions and Yangon United were winner-up at the previous shield final. They will start play from Quarter final.

The cup winner is guaranteed a place in the 2019 AFC Cup.

== Prize fund ==
Round	No. of Clubs receive fund	Prize fund per club
Champion	1	K 300,000,000
Final runners-up	1	K 150,000,000
Semi-Final	2	K 75,000,000

== Results ==
=== Preliminary round ===
Preliminary round consists of two rounds for teams currently playing in the Regional League Division 1 level. The first round was held 6 February 2018.

==== First round ====
12 May 2018	GFA	1–0	Silver Stars	Yangon
16:00 MMT	Jordan 34'			Stadium: Thuwunna Stadium; Referee: Aung Thu

12 May 2018	Royal Thanlyin	3–1	University	Yangon
16:00 MMT	Leon 35'; Chan oo 75'; Elysee 81'		Nay Myo Htwe 51'	Stadium: Padonmar Stadium; Referee: Thein Saw

12 May 2018	Kachin United	1–3	Dagon	Yangon
16:00 MMT	Paw Du Aung 45'		Soe Myat Thu 5'; Aung Khaing Tun 18'; Jonathan 75' (o.g)	Stadium: Aung San Stadium; Referee: Zaw Khaing

13 May 2018	Sagaing United	2–2 (a.e.t.) (5–3 p)	Myawady	Yangon
16:00 MMT	Bamba 45' (49)		Thet Paing Ko 25'; Ye Wai yan Soe 90+1'	Stadium: Thuwunna Stadium; Referee: Kyaw Zayar Aung

13 May 2017	Mountain Lion	4–2 (a.e.t.)	Mawyawadi	Yangon
16:00 MMT	Kyaw Zin Oo 38', 58'; Aung Myat Thu 106', 117'		Saw Myo Lin 22'; Htet Wai Aung 45'	Stadium: Aung San Stadium; Referee: Thein Tun

==== Second round ====
30 May 2018	Southern Myanmar	2–3	GFA	Thuwunna Stadium
16:00 MMT	Phyo Paing Soe 81'; Berry 90+3'		Soe Min Tun 51'; Mung Theih Pau 61'; Pyone Cho 86'

30 May 2018	Ayeyawady United	1–0	Royal Thanlyin	Yangon
16:00 MMT	Thiha Zaw 67'			Stadium: Padonmar Stadium

30 May 2018	Magwe	5–0	Dagon	Yangon
16:00 MMT	Kyaw Swar Linn 45+3'; Naing Naing Kyaw 50'; Maung Maung Soe 52', 57'; Zin Min Tun 87'			Stadium: Aung San Stadium

6 June 2018	Yadanarbon	1–2 (a.e.t.)	Sagaing United	Yangon
16:00 MMT	Thein Than Win 70'		Pyae Sone Aung 53'; Thiha Zaw 95'	Stadium: Padonmar Stadium; Referee: Thein Tun

6 June 2017	Hanthawady United	4–1	Zwekapin United	Yangon
16:00 MMT	Joseph Mpande 12', 29', 34'; Paing Moe Wai 65'		Edison Fonseca 82' (pen.)	Stadium: Aung San Stadium

6 June 2017	Rakhine United	3–0	Mountain Lion	Yangon
16:00 MMT	Clifford 45'; Sunday Mathew 67', 86'			Stadium: Thuwunna Stadium

=== Quarter-final ===
13 June 2018	Yangon United	2–0	GFA	Yangon
16:00 MMT	Aee Soe 53'; Zaw Min Tun 76'			Stadium: Thuwunna Stadium

13 June 2018	Ayeyawady United	2–2 (a.e.t.) (11–12 p)	Magwe	Yangon
16:00 MMT	Cássio Magalhães 59'; Thiha Zaw 75'		Zayar Naing 44'; Maung Maung Soe 57'	Stadium: Aung San Stadium

20 June 2018	Shan United	3–0	Rakhine United	Yangon
16:00 MMT	Dway Ko Ko Chit 27', 61', 84'			Stadium: Thuwunna Stadium

20 June 2018	Sagaing United	1–2	Hanthawady United	Yangon
16:00 MMT	Kaung Zaw Htwe 89'		Mark Sekyi 22', 53'	Stadium: Aung San Stadium

=== Semi-final ===
==== First leg ====
18 September 2018	Yangon United	1–0	Magwe	Yangon
15:30 MMT	Sylla Sekou 80'			Stadium: Y.U.S.C

19 September 2018	Hanthawady United	0–0	Shan United	Bago
15:30 MMT				Stadium: Grand Royal Stadium

==== Second leg ====
26 September 2018	Magwe	2–2	Yangon United	Yangon
16:00 MMT	Aung Myint Tun 24'; Maung Maung Soe 26'		Maung Maung Lwin 4'; Emmanuel 89'	Stadium: Thuwunna Stadium

27 September 2018	Shan United	0–1	Hanthawady United	Taunggyi
15:30 MMT			Mark Sekyi 51'	Stadium: Taunggyi Stadium

=== Final ===
30 September 2018	Yangon United	2–1	Hanthawady United	Yangon
16:00 MMT	Maung Maung Lwin 72'; Zaw Min Tun 85'		Hein Htet Aung 60'	Stadium: Aung San Stadium

== Top goalscorers ==
Rank	Player	Club	Goals
1	(Myanmar) Maung Maung Soe	Magwe	4
2	(Uganda) Joseph Mpande	Hanthawaddy United	3
2	(Myanmar) Dway Ko Ko Chit	Shan United	3
2	(Ghana) Mark Sekyi	Hanthawaddy United	3
5	(Myanmar) Kyaw Zin Oo	Mountain Lions	2
5	(Myanmar) Aung Myat Thu	Mountain Lions	2
5	(Ivory Coast) Bamba	Sagaing United	2
5	(Nigeria) Sunday Mathew	Rakhine United	2
5	(Myanmar) Zaw Min Tun	Yangon United	2
5	(Myanmar) Maung Maung Lwin	Yangon United	2
11	(Nigeria) Jordan	GFA	1
11	(Nigeria) Leon	Royal Thanlyin	1
11	(Myanmar) Chan Oo	Royal Thanlyin	1
11	(Nigeria) Elysee	Royal Thanlyin	1
11	(Myanmar) Nay Myo Htwe	University	1
11	(Myanmar) Soe Myat Thu	Dagon	1
11	(Myanmar) Aung Khaing Tun	Dagon	1
11	(Guinea) Sylla Sekou	Yangon United	1
11	(Myanmar) Aee Soe	Yangon United	1
11	(Nigeria) Emmanuel	Yangon United	1
11	(Brazil) Cássio Magalhães	Ayeyawady United	1
11	(Myanmar) Thiha Zaw	Ayeyawady United	1
11	(Myanmar) Zayar Naing	Magwe	1
11	(Myanmar) Paw Du Aung	Kachin United	1
11	(Myanmar) Soe Min Tun	GFA	1
11	(Myanmar) Mung Theih Pau	GFA	1
11	(Myanmar) Pyone Cho	GFA	1
11	(Myanmar) Phyo Paing Soe	Southern Myanmar	1
11	(Guinea) Alpha Berry	Southern Myanmar	1
11	(Myanmar) Kyaw Swar Linn	Magwe	1
11	(Myanmar) Naing Naing Kyaw	Magwe	1
11	(Myanmar) Zin Min Tun	Magwe	1
11	(Myanmar) Thein Than Win	Yadanarbon	1
11	(Myanmar) Thiha Zaw	Sagaing United	1
11	(Myanmar) Pyae Sone Aung	Sagaing United	1
11	(Myanmar) Kaung Zaw Htwe	Sagaing United	1
11	(Colombia) Edison Fonseca	Zwekapin United	1
11	(Myanmar) Paing Moe Wai	Hanthawaddy United	1
11	(Nigeria) Clifford	Rakhine United	1

== Sponsor ==
=== Official Main Sponsor ===
- Myanmar Brewery Ltd

=== Official Partner ===
- AYA Bank

=== Media Broadcasting ===
- MWD

=== Co-sponsor ===
- 100 Plus
- AYA Myanmar Insurance
- M-150
- Thanlwin Private School
- Sumitomo Electric
