= 2017 Chin United season =

Chin United
2017 season
- Owner: (Myanmar) Dr James Lian Sai
- Chairman: (Myanmar) U Min Hein Kyaw
- Stadium: Har Kharr Stadium

Chin United Football Club is a Burmese football club, based at Chin State, Myanmar. The club is one of the two teams representing Chin State along with GFA FC.

== Sponsorship ==
Period	Sportswear	Sponsor
2017	(Thailand) Pro Sport	(Thailand) M-150

== Club ==
=== Coaching staff ===
Position	Staff
Manager	(Myanmar) U Myint Swe
Assistant Manager	(Myanmar) U Yarza Win Thein
Goalkeeper Coach	
Fitness Coach	

=== Other information ===
Owner	(Myanmar) Dr James Lian Sai
C.E.O	(Myanmar) U Min Hein
Ground (capacity and dimensions)	Har Kar Stadium (30,000 / 103x67 metres)
Training Ground	Har Khar Stadium

== 2017 squad ==
Note: Flags indicate national team as defined under FIFA eligibility rules; some limited exceptions apply. Players may hold more than one non-FIFA nationality.

No.	Pos.	Nation	Player
1	GK	(Myanmar) MYA	Htet Maung Maung Thant Zin
2	DF	(Myanmar) MYA	Zaw Zaw Tun
3	DF	(Liberia) LBR	Sackie Teah Doe
4	DF	(Myanmar) MYA	Tluang Hup Thang
5	MF	(Myanmar) MYA	Ko Ko Maung
7	FW	(Myanmar) MYA	Suan Lam Mang
8	MF	(Myanmar) MYA	Bawi Naum Thang
9	FW	(Myanmar) MYA	Than Paing
10	MF	(Myanmar) MYA	Ram Hlei Ceu
11	MF	(Myanmar) MYA	Aung Moe
13	DF	(Myanmar) MYA	Ram Din Sanga(1)
14	DF	(Myanmar) MYA	Nyein Chan Aung
15	MF	(Myanmar) MYA	Thota Chola
16	DF	(Myanmar) MYA	Thiha Htet Aung
17	MF	(Myanmar) MYA	Nyi Nyi Htun
18	GK	(Myanmar) MYA	Thant Zin Nyo

No.	Pos.	Nation	Player
19	MF	(Myanmar) MYA	Thein Dan
20	MF	(Myanmar) MYA	Thura Min Naing
21	MF	(Myanmar) MYA	Kyaw Lwin Moe
22	DF	(Myanmar) MYA	Pyae Phyo Thu
23	MF	(Myanmar) MYA	Soe Min Tun
25	FW	(Myanmar) MYA	Khup Lem Tuang
27	MF	(Myanmar) MYA	Nyi Nyi Min
44	DF	(Cameroon) CMR	Soulemadou
77	DF	(Myanmar) MYA	Nyar Na Lwin
99	FW	(Cameroon) CMR	Ahmadou
—	MF	(Myanmar) MYA	Soe Lin Tun
