= Aee Soe =

Burmese footballer

Personal information
- Full name: Aee Soe
- Date of birth: 15 November 1996 (age 29)
- Place of birth: Myitkyina, Myanmar
- Height: 1.75 m (5 ft 9 in)
- Positions: Winger; forward

Team information
- Current team: Yangon United
- Number: 27

Youth career
- 2015–2016: Manawmyay Youth Team

Senior career*
Years	Team	Apps	(Gls)
2017–2021	Yangon United	21	(7)
2022	Young Elephants	17	(4)
2023–2024	Kasetsart	26	(2)
2024–	Yangon United		

International career
2016–2017	Myanmar U21	5	(2)
2018–	Myanmar	9	(0)
- * Club domestic league appearances and goals

Aee Soe (Burmese: အီစိုး; born 15 November 1996) is a Burmese professional footballer who plays as a winger or a forward.

== Club career ==
=== Early year ===
In 2015, Aee Soe played in Manaw Myay Youth team and showed individual skill. Aee Soe was chosen for Manaw Myay Senior Team in 2016. But Manaw Myay FC quit from 2016 MNL season. And then, Yangon United Coaches called him to Yangon United Youth Team. In 2017, he was called for Myanmar U21 to play 2017 International U-21 Thanh Niên Newspaper Cup. In the competition, he made his best performance and scored two goals.

=== Yangon United ===
In 2018, Yangon United chose Aee Soe for 2018 Myanmar National League squad list. On January 28, Aee Soe played his first professional match against Sagaing United F.C. at Away. Aee Soe scored his first professional goal against GFA and his first international goal won 2–1 against FLC Thanh Hóa.

=== Young Elephants FC ===
In 2022 May, Aee Soe cancelled the contract with Yangon United and transferred to Young Elephants.

== Honours ==
Young Elephants

- Lao Premier League: 2022
- Lao FF Cup: 2022
