= Sekou Sylla (footballer, born 1992) =

Guinean footballer

Personal information
- Date of birth: 1 January 1992 (age 34)
- Place of birth: Conakry, Guinea
- Height: 1.80 m (5 ft 11 in)
- Position: Striker

Senior career*
Years	Team	Apps	(Gls)
2012–2014	Sriracha		
2014	Chanthaburi		
2014–2017	Magwe	69	(28)
2017	Global Cebu	3	(5)
2018–2019	Yangon United	57	(46)
2020	Haiphong	0	(0)
2021–2022	Churchill Brothers	8	(0)
2023	Yangon United	15	(11)
2023	Persikab Bandung	10	(6)
2024	Sheikh Russel KC	6	(1)
2024–2025	Deltras	7	(2)
- * Club domestic league appearances and goals as of 12 February 2025

Sekou Sylla (born 1 January 1992) is a Guinean professional footballer who plays as a striker. He is Yangon United's all-time third-highest goalscorer with 53 Goals.

== Club career ==
=== Sriracha ===
Sylla began his professional career at Sriracha of Thai Division 1 League in March 2012 and played until December 2012.

=== Chanthaburi ===
In January 2014, he signed with Thai side Chanthaburi, competing in League 3 but did not appear in any league match.

=== Magwe ===
In 2014, Sylla moved to the Myanmar National League and signed with Magwe. He represented the club in 2017 AFC Cup, where he made four appearances, notching an equalizer to tie with Malaysian side Johor Darul Ta'zim 1–1, and another goal to salvage a 1–1 draw with Cambodian side Boeung Ket.

With Magwe, he appeared in 88 league matches between 2014 and 2017, scoring 18 goals. He also won the 2016 General Aung San Shield with them, defeating Yangon 2–1.

=== Global Cebu ===
Traded to Filipino side Global Cebu in 2017, the Guinean authored a brace for his new club in a 3–1 win over Kaya FC-Makati, and earning the man of the match award. He played only three matches for the Philippines Football League side and scored 5 goals.

=== Yangon United ===
In December 2017, he moved to another Burmese side Yangon United and appeared in domestic tournaments such as Myanmar National League, General Aung San Shield, and MPT Charity Cup. With Yangon, he played in the 2018 AFC Cup and scored 10 goals in 7 matches. He was in the squad of United, that won 2018 General Aung San Shield defeating Hanthawaddy United 2–1, where he scored a goal.

In 2018, Yangon also won the Myanmar National League title and Sylla emerged as second highest goalscorer with 17 goals, behind Joseph Mpande. Between 2017 and 2019, he scored a total of 41 goals in 53 matches.

=== Haiphong ===
In 2020, he moved to Vietnamese V.League 1 side Haiphong FC.

=== Churchill Brothers ===
In July 2021, Sylla signed for I-League outfit Churchill Brothers for their 2021–22 I-League season. He is the first foreign recruit of the season for the Goa-based side. He made his debut in their 1–0 defeat to Gokulam Kerala on 26 December.

== Club statistics ==
Appearances and goals by club team and year
Club team	Year	Apps	Goals	Assists
Sriracha	2012	0	0	0
Sriracha	2013	0	0	0
Sriracha	2014	0	0	0
Chanthaburi	2014	0	0	0
Magwe	2014	21	8	0
Magwe	2015	22	7	0
Magwe	2016	26	13	0
Global Cebu	2017	3	5	0
Yangon United	2018	28	29	6
Yangon United	2019	26	17	4
Haiphong	2020	0	0	0
Churchill Brothers	2022	8	0	1
Yangon United	2023	15	11	5
Persikab Bandung	2023	10	6	0
Sheikh Russel KC	2024	6	1	0
Deltras	2024	1	0	0
Deltras	2025	6	2	0
Total		173	99	11

== Honours ==
Magwe

- General Aung San Shield: 2016

Yangon United

- Myanmar National League: 2018
- General Aung San Shield: 2018
