= Aung Hein Kyaw =

Burmese footballer

Personal information
- Full name: Aung Hein Kyaw
- Date of birth: 19 July 1991 (age 35)
- Place of birth: Monywa, Myanmar
- Height: 1.77 m (5 ft 9 1/2 in)
- Position: Defender

Team information
- Current team: Sagaing United
- Number: 24

Senior career*
Years	Team	Apps	(Gls)
2009 – 2015	Zeyar Shwe Myay	100	(?)
2015 – 2018	Ayeyawady United	12	(2)
2019	Chinland	20	(1)
2019 –	Sagaing United	46	(0)

International career^{‡}
2012 – 2015	Myanmar U22	5	(0)
2013 – 2015	Myanmar U23	4	(0)
2012 –	Myanmar	13	(0)
- * Club domestic league appearances and goals as of 16 July 2023 ‡ National team caps and goals as of 25 December 2015

Aung Hein Kyaw (Burmese: အောင်ဟိန်းကျော်; born 19 July 1991) is a Burmese footballer who plays as a defender for Myanmar national football team and Myanmar U-22 football team. He played in 2013 AFC U-22 Asian Cup qualification.

He played for Zeyar Shwe Myay in Myanmar National League. In December 2015, he transferred to Ayeyawady United F.C.
