= Dedimar Ferreira =

Brazilian footballer (born 1992)

Personal information
- Full name: Dedimar Ferreira das Chagas
- Date of birth: 22 April 1992 (age 34)
- Place of birth: Manaus, Brazil
- Height: 1.87 m (6 ft 2 in)
- Position: Defender

Youth career
- 2012: Araxá

Senior career*
Years	Team	Apps	(Gls)
2010–2011	Sul América	0	(0)
2012	Holanda	0	(0)
2013	Sinop		
2014	Ypiranga-PE	0	(0)
2014	Afogados da Ingazeira		
2017	Rio Negro-AM	0	(0)
2017–2018	Kapaz	13	(0)
2019	Shan United	3	(0)
- * Club domestic league appearances and goals as of 20:31, 4 July 2019 (UTC)

Dedimar Ferreira das Chagas (born 22 April 1992), commonly known as Dedimar or Dedimar Ferreira, is a Brazilian footballer.

== Career statistics ==
=== Club ===
As of 4 July 2019.

Club	Season	League			State League		Cup		Continental		Other		Total	
Club	Season	Division	Apps	Goals	Apps	Goals	Apps	Goals	Apps	Goals	Apps	Goals	Apps	Goals
Sul América	2010	–			1 (Note: Appearances in the Campeonato Amazonense)	3	0	0	–		0	0	1	3
Sul América	2011	–			3	0	0	0	–		0	0	3	0
Sul América	Total		0	0	4	3	0	0	0	0	0	0	4	3
Holanda	2012	–			7	1	0	0	–		0	0	7	1
Ypiranga-PE	2014	–			14 (Note: Appearances in the Campeonato Pernambucano)	0	0	0	–		0	0	14	0
Rio Negro-AM	2017	–			9	0	0	0	–		0	0	9	0
Kapaz	2017–18	Azerbaijan Premier League	13	0	–		3 (Note: Appearances in the Azerbaijan Cup)	0	–		0	0	16	0
Shan United	2019	Myanmar National League	3	0	–		0	0	1 (Note: Appearances in the AFC Cup)	0	0	0	4	0
Career total			16	0	34	4	3	0	1	0	0	0	54	4
