= Zaw Lin =

Burmese footballer

Personal information
- Full name: Zaw Lin
- Date of birth: 14 May 1992 (age 34)
- Place of birth: Yangon, Myanmar
- Height: 1.83 m (6 ft 0 in)
- Position: Defender

Team information
- Current team: Ayeyawady United
- Number: 99

Senior career*
Years	Team	Apps	(Gls)
2014–2018	Shan United	62	(2)
2019–2022	Ayeyawady United	40	(3)
2023–	GFA	16	(0)

International career^{‡}
2015–	Myanmar	7	(0)
- * Club domestic league appearances and goals ‡ National team caps and goals as of 10 July 2016

Zaw Lin (born 14 May 1992) is a Burmese professional footballer who plays as a defender for Ayeyawady United F.C. and Myanmar national football team.
