= Phoe Chit =

Burmese actor, singer and dancer (born 1982)

- ဖိုးချစ်
- Born: Chit Myo Htike; 15 February 1982 (age 44); Kanbalu, Sagaing Region, Myanmar
- Education: Yadanabon University
- Occupations: Dancer, actor, footballer
- Years active: 2005—present
- Organization: Phoe Chit Thabin
- Known for: Burmese dance
- Parent(s): U Sein Win Thaung (father); Daw Thein Thein Mya (mother)

Phoe Chit (Burmese: ဖိုးချစ်; born Chit Myo Htike on 15 February 1982) is a prominent traditional leading Burmese dance actor in Myanmar Drama Event. He has found success in VCD distribution of his thabin performances, including Seven Kinds of Dance Performances in the Arts (အကခုနှစ်ဖြာအနုပညာ). He has since branched into the film industry, acting in films such as Law Mingala (လော်မင်္ဂလာ).

He founded the Phoe Chit theatre troupe. In 2012, he began constructing a housing complex for his troupe's performers in Mingaladon Township, Yangon, consisting of 200 homes and dance studios. He is founder and chairman of Sagaing United F.C., founded in 2015. * On 30 November 2022, he is taken into custody for his role in opposing the military rule.

== Early life and education ==
Phoe Chit was born on 15 February in Kanbalu, Sagaing Region, Myanmar to parents U Sein Win Thaung and Daw Thein Thein Mya. He is youngest of six siblings. He attended high school at B.E.H.S (1) Kanbalu. He graduated with a degree B.Sc (Maths) from Yadanabon University.

== See also ==
- Burmese dance
- Anyeint
