= Thet Naing =

Burmese footballer

Personal information
- Full name: Thet Naing
- Date of birth: 20 December 1992 (age 33)
- Place of birth: Mandalay, Myanmar
- Height: 1.71 m (5 ft 7 in)
- Positions: Striker; attacking midfielder

Team information
- Current team: Mahar United
- Number: 90

Senior career*
Years	Team	Apps	(Gls)
2009–2022	Yadanarbon	209	(24)
2023–	Mahar United	11	(11)

International career^{‡}
2012–2014	Myanmar U-23	8	(0)
2012–2021	Myanmar	18	(2)
- * Club domestic league appearances and goals as of 22 October 2023 ‡ National team caps and goals as of 31 August 2017

Thet Naing (Burmese: သက်နိုင်; born 20 December 1992) is a Burmese footballer who plays as a striker or an attacking midfielder for Mahar United and the Myanmar national team. He represented Myanmar at the 2013 Southeast Asian Games.
