= Frederic Pooda =

Ivorian professional football midfielder (born 1988)

Personal information
- Date of birth: 16 April 1988 (age 38)
- Place of birth: Bonon, Ivory Coast
- Height: 6 ft 2 in (1.88 m)
- Position: Midfielder

Team information
- Current team: Bangladesh Police FC
- Number: 15

Senior career*
Years	Team	Apps	(Gls)
2003–05	Club Bouafle		
2005–06	Sporting Club Gagnoa		
2006–07	Jean Marc Guillou		
2007–08	Séwé Sport de San-Pédro		
2007–08	Stage FUS		
2008–09	Stade d'Abidjan		
2009–11	Séwé Sport de San-Pédro		
2012–14	Yala FC	23	(8)
2014–15	Lao Toyota	55	(17)
2015–16	Sime Darby	48	(12)
2016–17	PDRM FA	34	(8)
2018	Lao Toyota	2	(1)
2018–19	Hanthawaddy United	20	(5)
2021–	Bangladesh Police FC	15	(4)
- * Club domestic league appearances and goals as of 30 June 2021

Frederic Pooda (born 16 April 1988) is an Ivorian professional football midfielder who plays for Bangladesh Police FC in the Bangladesh Premier League. He is one of the top scorers of Bangladesh Police FC.
