= Cássio Magalhães =

Brazilian footballer (born 1990)

Personal information
- Full name: Cássio Horta Magalhães
- Date of birth: 20 August 1990 (age 36)
- Place of birth: Brazil
- Height: 1.73 m (5 ft 8 in)
- Position: Forward

Team information
- Current team: Ayeyawady United
- Number: 28

Senior career*
Years	Team	Apps	(Gls)
2011–2012	NK Travnik	11	(1)
2012–2015	Thun	46	(3)
2015	Platanias	9	(0)
2016	Portuguesa	2	(0)
2016	Uberlândia		
2017	Ipatinga		
2018–	Ayeyawady United	11	(6)
- * Club domestic league appearances and goals as of 29 April 2018

Cássio Horta Magalhães also called Cassio (Coronel Fabriciano, 20 August 1990) is a Brazilian footballer who plays for Myanmar side Ayeyawady United.
