= Kaung Sithu =

Burmese footballer

Personal information
- Full name: Kaung Sithu
- Date of birth: 22 January 1993 (age 33)
- Place of birth: Mandalay, Myanmar
- Height: 1.72 m (5 ft 7 1/2 in)
- Position: Striker

Team information
- Current team: Yangon United
- Number: 10

Senior career*
Years	Team	Apps	(Gls)
2009	Yangon United	?	(?)
2013–2015	Yadanarbon FC	22+	(4+)
2015	Zeyar Shwe Myay	11	(?)
2015	Zwegapin United	11	(?)
2016	Zeyar Shwe Myay	22	(?)
2017–2021	Southern Myanmar	65	(17)
2023	Rakhine United	12	(5)
2024–	Yangon United		

International career^{‡}
2012–	Myanmar	12	(2)
2012–2014	Myanmar U-22	2	(3)
2013–2015	Myanmar U-23		
- * Club domestic league appearances and goals as of 3 December 2018 ‡ National team caps and goals as of 18 May 2017

Kaung Sithu (Burmese: ကောင်းစည်သူ; born 22 January 1993) is a Burmese professional footballer who plays as a striker for the Myanmar national football team and Southern Myanmar F.C. He scored 3 goals in 2013 AFC U-22 Asian Cup qualification including a brace in qualification decider against Malaysia.

== International ==
As of match played 10 September 2019

Appearances and goals by national team and year
National team	Year	Apps	Goals
Myanmar	2012	7	2
Myanmar	2014	2	0
Myanmar	2019	2	0
Total		11	2

== International goals ==
Scores and results list Myanmar's goal tally first.

#	Date	Venue	Opponent	Score	Result	Competition
1.	11 October 2012	Thuwunna Stadium, Yangon, Myanmar	Cambodia	2–0	3–0	2012 AFF Suzuki Cup qualification
