= Maung Maung Soe (footballer) =

Burmese footballer

Personal information
- Full name: Maung Maung Soe
- Date of birth: 6 August 1995 (age 31)
- Place of birth: Yangon, Myanmar
- Height: 1.65 m (5 ft 5 in)
- Positions: Striker; winger

Team information
- Current team: Rakhine United
- Number: 10

Youth career
- 2011 – 2012: Zeleznicar Nis

Senior career*
Years	Team	Apps	(Gls)
2013–2018	Magwe	60	(20)
2018–2019	Yadanarbon	16	(1)
2022	GFA	15	(0)
2023–	Rakhine United	14	(3)

International career^{‡}
2013–2015	Myanmar U-19	14	(5)
2014–2017	Myanmar U-22	3	(1)
2018–	Myanmar	4	(0)
- * Club domestic league appearances and goals as of 22 October 2023 ‡ National team caps and goals as of 30 May 2018

Maung Maung Soe (Burmese: မောင်မောင်စိုး; born 6 August 1995) is a footballer from Burma, and a striker for the Myanmar national football team and Magway FC.
