= Kosuke Uchida =

Japanese footballer

Personal information
- Full name: Kosuke Yamazaki Uchida
- Date of birth: 2 October 1987 (age 39)
- Place of birth: Kyoto, Japan
- Height: 1.68 m (5 ft 6 in)
- Position: Midfielder

Youth career
- 2006–2009: Ritsumeikan University

Senior career*
Years	Team	Apps	(Gls)
2010–2011	Oita Trinita	21	(0)
2012	FC Ryukyu	16	(1)
2013	Grbalj	13	(0)
2013	→ Bokelj (loan)	6	(0)
2013–2014	Deutschlandsberger	20	(2)
2014–2015	Lanexang United	29	(2)
2016	Budaiya	10	(0)
2016–2017	Lanexang United	15	(0)
2017	Persela Lamongan	22	(2)
2018–2019	Yangon United	53	(8)
2019	Barito Putera	18	(1)
2021–2022	Angkor Tiger	18	(0)
2022	Delhi		
2022	Sudeva Delhi	5	(0)
- * Club domestic league appearances and goals as of 18:34, 7 December 2022 (UTC)

Kosuke Yamazaki Uchida (内田 昂輔, Uchida Kosuke; born 2 October 1987) is a Japanese professional footballer who plays as a midfielder.

== Career ==
During 2010, he played in Japan in J2 League with Oita Trinita. In summer 2012, he moved to Montenegro and joined top-league side OFK Grbalj. After a short spell there where he failed to make any league appearance, he moved to FK Bokelj and won with them the 2013–14 Montenegrin Second League and earned a promotion to the First League in next season.

He scored his first goal for Yangon United FC against Hanthawaddy United F.C. in the beginning of the 2018 Myanmar National league.

In 2022, Uchida signed with I-League 2nd Division side Delhi FC, before moving to I-League club Sudeva Delhi.

== Honours ==
Bokelj

- Montenegrin Second League: 2013–14
