= Joseph Mpande =

Ugandan footballer (born 1994)

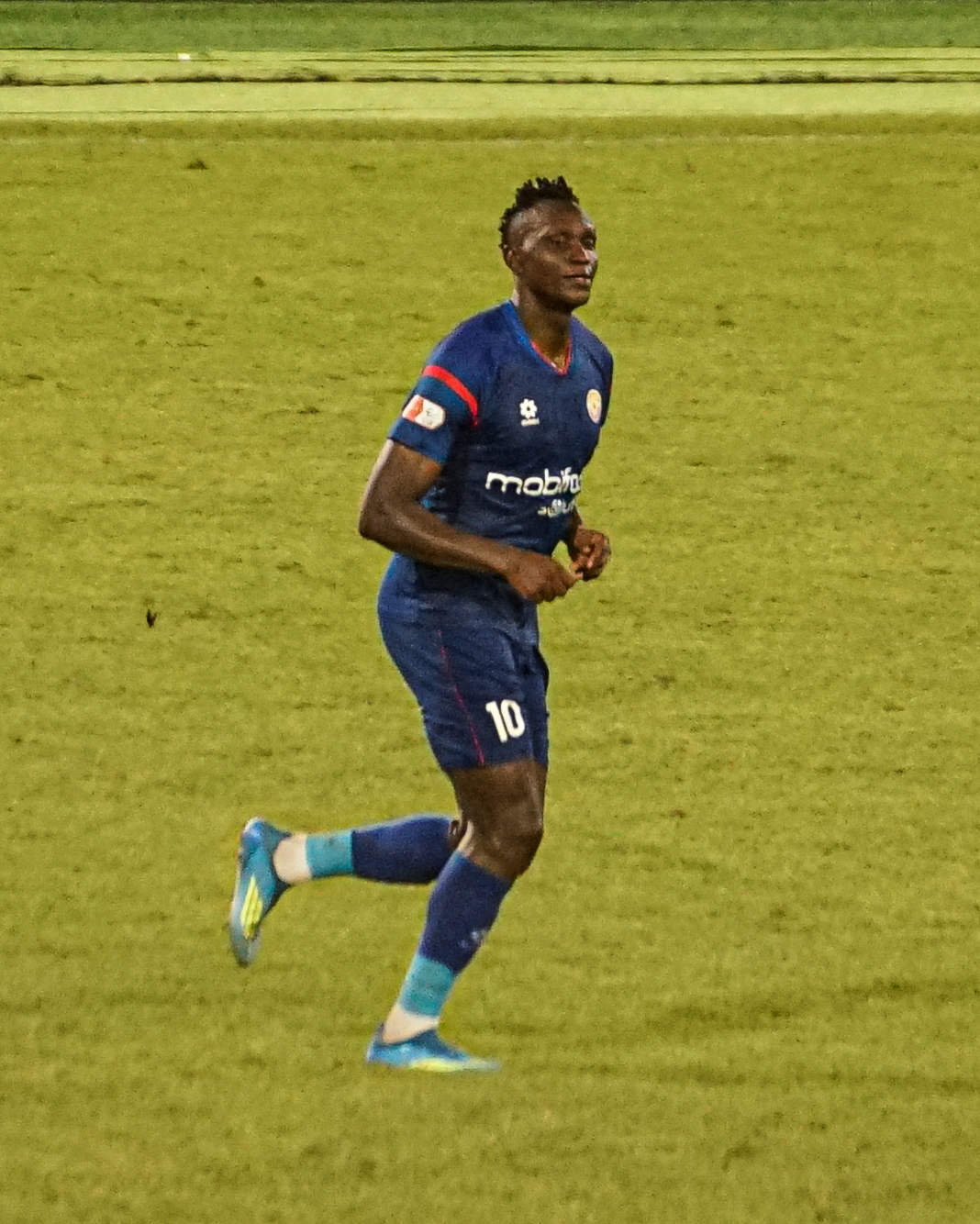
- Mpande in 2026

Personal information
- Full name: Joseph Mpande Mbolimbo
- Date of birth: 12 March 1994 (age 32)
- Place of birth: Kampala, Uganda
- Height: 1.83 m (6 ft 0 in)
- Position: Midfielder

Team information
- Current team: Haiphong
- Number: 99

Senior career*
Years	Team	Apps	(Gls)
2009–2010	Villa		
2011–2015	Vipers		
2016–2017	Horizon		
2018	Hanthawady United	18	(17)
2019–2024	Haiphong	108	(34)
2024–2025	Thep Xanh Nam Dinh	11	(4)
2025–2026	PVF-CAND	21	(2)
2026–	Haiphong	1	(0)

International career^{‡}
2012–	Uganda	19	(0)
- * Club domestic league appearances and goals as of 5 September 2026 ‡ National team caps and goals as of 14 November 2025

Joseph Mpande Mbolimbo (born 12 March 1994) is a Ugandan professional footballer who plays as a midfielder for V.League 1 club Haiphong and the Uganda national team.

== Club career ==
After leaving Myanmar Premier League, Mpande moved to V.League 1 and play for Haiphong, where he made more than 100 appearances for the team. In July 2024, he signed for V.League 1 fellow Thep Xanh Nam Dinh.

After leaving PVF-CAND, Mpande returned to Haiphong in September 2026.

== International career ==
In January 2014, coach Milutin Sredojević had included Mpande to Uganda national team's squad for the 2014 African Nations Championship. The team placed third in the group stage of the competition after beating Burkina Faso, drawing with Zimbabwe and losing to Morocco.

On 29 August 2025, Mpande got called up for the Uganda national team after 11 years.

== Career statistics ==
As of match played 8 September 2025

Appearances and goals by national team and year
National team	Year	Apps	Goals
Uganda	2012	1	0
Uganda	2013	12	0
Uganda	2014	2	0
Uganda	2025	2	0
Total		17	0

== Honours ==
Vipers

- Uganda Premier League: 2014–15
- Ugandan Super Cup: 2015

Thép Xanh Nam Định

- V.League 1: 2024–25
- Vietnamese Super Cup: 2024

Individual

- Myanmar National League top scorer: 2018
