= Yamanya Stadium =

Sports stadium in Mawlamyine, Myanmar

Coordinates: 16°29′44.6″N 97°37′20.3″E

- ရာမည အားကစားကွင်း
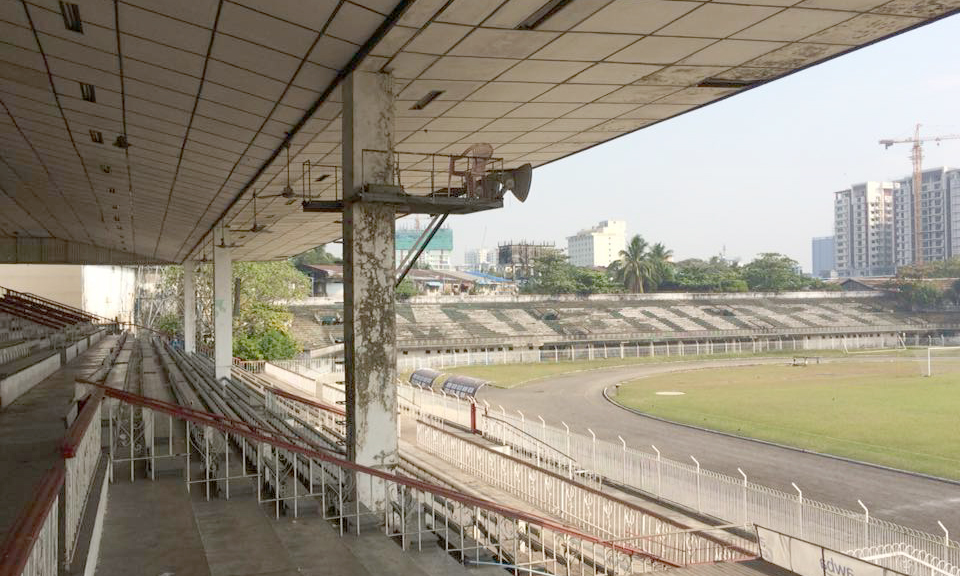
- Interactive map of Yamanya Stadium
- Location: Mawlamyine, Myanmar
- Capacity: 20,000
- Surface: Grass

Construction
- Opened: 2016
- Renovated: 2016

Tenant
- Southern Myanmar

Yamanya Stadium is a multi-purpose stadium, located in downtown Mawlamyine, Myanmar.

Yamanya Stadium also hosts other local and regional football tournaments. Now, this stadium is under construction. Southern Myanmar F.C is based in this stadium in for Myanmar National League.
