= Thein Than Win =

Burmese footballer

Personal information
- Full name: Thein Than Win
- Date of birth: 25 November 1991 (age 34)
- Place of birth: Myanmar
- Height: 1.70 m (5 ft 7 in)
- Position: Left-back

Senior career*
Years	Team	Apps	(Gls)
2009–2015	Shan United	98	(1)
2015–2019	Yadanarbon	72	(6)
2019	→ Ratchaburi Mitr Phol (loan)	0	(0)
2019–2021	Yangon United	12	(0)
2022	Rakhine United	10	(1)
2023–	Dagon Star United	19	(0)

International career^{‡}
2012–2013	Myanmar U-22	5	(0)
2012–	Myanmar	31	(0)
- * Club domestic league appearances and goals as of 16 August 2024 ‡ National team caps and goals as of 15 June 2021

Thein Than Win (Burmese: သိန်းသန်းဝင်း; born 25 November 1991), is a Burmese professional footballer who plays as a left-back for Myanmar National League club Yangon United and the Myanmar national football team.

He played for Kanbawza FC in Myanmar National League. On 11 December 2019, he moved to Yangon United FC on a one-year contract.

== International ==
As of match played 15 June 2021

Appearances and goals by national team and year
National team	Year	Apps	Goals	Assists
Myanmar	2012	6	0	0
Myanmar	2013	4	0	0
Myanmar	2017	7	0	2
Myanmar	2018	8	0	2
Myanmar	2019	3	0	0
Myanmar	2021	3	0	0
Total		31	0	4

== Honours ==
Individual

- ASEAN All-Stars: 2014
