= Aung Moe =

Burmese footballer

Personal information
- Full name: Aung Moe
- Date of birth: 9 June 1985 (age 41)
- Height: 1.67 m (5 ft 5 1/2 in)
- Position: Midfielder

Team information
- Current team: Southern Myanmar
- Number: 11

Senior career*
Years	Team	Apps	(Gls)
2009 – 2013	Zeyar Shwe Myay	46	(0)
2013 – 2015	Yangon United	18	(0)
2016	Zwekapin United	20	(7)
2017	Chin United	11	(2)
2018 – 2020	Southern Myanmar	29	(6)
Total		124	(15)

International career^{‡}
2012 – 2020	Myanmar	3	(0)
- * Club domestic league appearances and goals as of 16 July 2023 ‡ National team caps and goals as of 19 October 2016

Aung Moe (Burmese: အောင်မိုး; born 9 June 1985) is a footballer from Burma, and a midfielder for the Myanmar national football team.

He currently plays for Chin United in Myanmar National League.
