= Aung Myint Tun =

Burmese footballer

Personal information
- Full name: Aung Myint Tun
- Date of birth: 3 May 1990 (age 36)
- Place of birth: Maungdaw, Rakhine State, Myanmar
- Height: 1.68 m (5 ft 6 in)
- Position: Striker

Team information
- Current team: Magwe
- Number: 26

Senior career*
Years	Team	Apps	(Gls)
2015–2016	Hantharwady United	2	(5)
2016–2017	Ayeyawady United	2	(1)
2018–2020	Magwe	29	(12)
2022–	Rakhine United	1	(0)

International career^{‡}
2018–	Myanmar	9	(0)
- * Club domestic league appearances and goals as of 16 July 2023 ‡ National team caps and goals as of 21 November 2022

Aung Myint Tun (Burmese: အောင်မြင့်ထွန်း; born 3 May 1990) is a footballer from Burma, and a midfielder for the Myanmar national football team.

He currently plays for Magwe in Myanmar National League.
