= Sagaing United F.C. =

Sagaing United စစ်ကိုင်း ယူနိုက်တက် ဘောလုံးအသင်
- Full name: Sagaing United Football Club
- Nicknames: Anyarthsr အညာသား
- Founded: 2015; 11 years ago
- Ground: Monywa Stadium
- Capacity: 5,000
- Owner: Myo Win Naing
- Chairman: Phoe Chit
- Head coach: Zaw Linn Tun
- League: Myanmar National League
- 2025–26: MNL, 6th of 12
| Home colours | Away colours |

Sagaing United Football Club (also known as Mahar United; Burmese: စစ်ကိုင်း ယူနိုက်တက် ဘောလုံးအသင်း [zəɡáɪ̯ɴ]) is a professional football club based at Monywa Stadium in Monywa, Myanmar and represents the Sagaing Region. The club was founded in 2015 and played in the 2016 MNL-2 season. Their first competitive season in the Myanmar National League came in 2018. The club name has changed from "Mahar United" to "Sagaing United".

== Club trophies ==
=== Domestic League ===
- MNL-2

1st Runner up (1): 2017
League

- Myanmar National League

Fair Play Award (1): 2018

== Domestic league ==
| No | Season | Level | Pos | MP | W | D | L | GF | GA | Gd | Pts |
|---|---|---|---|---|---|---|---|---|---|---|---|
| 1 | 2016 | MNL-2 | 4 | | | | | | | | |
| 2 | 2017 | MNL-2 | 02 | | | | | | | | |
| 3 | 2018 | MNL-1 | 10 | 22 | 5 | 6 | 11 | 27 | 40 | -13 | 21 |
| 4 | 2019 | MNL-1 | 07 | 22 | 7 | 6 | 9 | 36 | 42 | -6 | 27 |
| 5 | 2020 | MNL-1 | | | | | | | | | |

== 2026-27 squad list ==
Note: Flags indicate national team as defined under FIFA eligibility rules; some limited exceptions apply. Players may hold more than one non-FIFA nationality.

| No. | Pos. | Nation | Player |
|---|---|---|---|
| 3 | DF | MYA | Kaung Htet Hein |
| 4 | DF | MYA | Toe Sat Naing |
| 5 | DF | MYA | Tin Thein |
| 6 | MF | MYA | Kaung Zayer Lin |
| 7 | FW | MYA | Chit Myo Hteik (Captain) |
| 8 | MF | MYA | Kyaw Swar Min |
| 10 | FW | MYA | Yazar Aung |
| 11 | MF | GHA | Issac Quansah |
| 12 | GK | MYA | Aung Ko Latt |
| 14 | DF | MYA | Htoo Wai Yan |
| 16 | MF | MYA | Myo Htet Oo |

| No. | Pos. | Nation | Player |
|---|---|---|---|
| 18 | MF | MYA | Zayar Lin |
| 19 | FW | MYA | Arsar Ko |
| 22 | GK | MYA | A Zin Hmue |
| 23 | DF | MYA | Arkar Myo |
| 25 | DF | MYA | Htike Htike Aung |
| 30 | MF | MYA | Phyo Thiha Zaw |
| 33 | MF | MYA | Thant Zin Phyo |
| 47 | MF | MYA | Aung Min Thu |
| 53 | MF | MYA | Sithu Phyo |
| 66 | MF | MYA | Yan Naing Lin |
| 70 | FW | MYA | Than Zaw Myo |
| 78 | MF | MYA | Nay Lin Soe |
| 88 | DF | MYA | Htet Zaw Tun (Vice-Captain) |
| 97 | FW | MYA | Kaung Myat Thu |
