= Chinland F.C. =

Chinland
- Full name: Chinland Football Club
- Nickname: The Outchin (အောက်ချင်း)
- Founded: 2006; 20 years ago
- Ground: Hakha Stadium
- Owner: Dr. CK No Chhum
- President: Thawng Tha Thang
- Head coach: U KB Siang Cung Lian
- League: MNL-2
- 2025-26: Champions

Chinland Football Club is a professional football club based in Chin State, Myanmar. It is one of the two clubs representing Chin State. At the end of the 2016 MNL-2, they were promoted again. For the 2019 MNL season, GFA changed their name to Chinland to represent the Chin State.

== 2026-27 Squad list ==
As of 28 August 2026

Note: Flags indicate national team as defined under FIFA eligibility rules; some limited exceptions apply. Players may hold more than one non-FIFA nationality.

| No. | Pos. | Nation | Player |
|---|---|---|---|
| 1 | GK | MYA | Aung Pyae Phyo |
| 2 | DF | MYA | Josiah Peng Za Thang |
| 4 | DF | BFA | Bagaya Halidou |
| 6 | MF | MYA | Kyaw Naing Tun |
| 7 | MF | MYA | John Kui Hleih |
| 8 | MF | GHA | Thomas Gyireh |
| 9 | FW | GUI | Sylla Djibril |
| 10 | FW | GHA | Anene Philip |
| 11 | FW | MYA | Hla Phone Oo |
| 12 | DF | MYA | Thet Ko Ko (captain) |
| 13 | MF | MYA | Van Hming Chuanga |

| No. | Pos. | Nation | Player |
|---|---|---|---|
| 14 | DF | CMR | Sadou Idris Djingui |
| 16 | MF | MYA | Nay Oo Lwin |
| 17 | MF | MYA | Dawt Bik Thang |
| 18 | GK | MYA | Kyaw Win Tun |
| 19 | MF | BEN | Yao Marc Degbe |
| 20 | FW | MYA | Peter Pau |
| 21 | MF | MYA | Naing Lin Tun |
| 23 | MF | MYA | Lal Cung Lian |
| 24 | FW | MYA | Van Bawi Thawng |
| 27 | MF | MYA | Arkar Phyo |
| 29 | FW | GUI | Alpha Ouermi Camara |

== Honors ==
=== Domestics ===
- MNL-2
  - Champion (1): 2024 , 2025-26
  - Runners-up (2): 2013, 2016
