= 2026–27 M League =

Myanmar professional football league

M League
- Season: 2026–27
- Dates: 28 August 2026 – 14 March 2027
- Matches: 35
- Goals: 122 (3.49 per match)
- Top goalscorer: Thiha Zaw (6 goals)
- Best goalkeeper: Hein Htet Soe (2 matches)
- Biggest home win: Chinland 5-1 Myawady (25 October 2026)
- Biggest away win: Ayeyawady United 0-5 Dagon Star United (6 Sept 2026)
- Highest scoring: Chinland 5-1 Myawady (25 October 2026)
- Longest unbeaten run: Shan United; Yangon City
- Longest winless run: Myawady
- Longest losing run: Myawady
- Average attendance: 5,000
- All statistics correct as of 21 November 2026.

The 2026–27 Grand Royal M League is the 17th season of the Myanmar League, the top Myanmar professional league for football clubs, since its establishment in 2009. Shan United will play as a defending champion in 2026–27 Myanmar National League. Myanmar National League banned the betting sponsor start form 2026-27 season.

== Rebranding ==
In August 2026, the MFF and MNL committees held an event at the Novotel Hotel to announce the rebranding of the Myanmar National League as the M-League. They also announced that the league’s logo had been changed and that the trophy had been redesigned with an international-style design.

== Team changes ==
12 teams will compete in the league – ten teams from the previous season and two teams promoted from MNL-2. Due to various financial and operational difficulties, Dagon Port withdrew from participation in the 2026–27 Myanmar National League (MNL) season. In accordance with the MNL 1 & 2 Regulations 2026, Article 23(c), the league committee proposed a play-off competition involving the teams that finished 11th and 12th in the 2025–26 Myanmar National League season, Rakhine United and Yarmanya United, together with the teams that placed 3rd and 4th in MNL 2, Yangon City and University. The play-off was to be conducted in a round-robin format, with the top team earning promotion to 2026-27. However, Rakhine United, Yarmanya United and University declined to participate in the proposed play-off. As a result, Yangon City proceeded to submit a request to the Myanmar National League Committee for approval to compete in the 2026-27 season.

=== Promoted from MNL-2 ===
- Chinland
- Myawady
- Yangon City due to Dagon Port disband

=== Relegated to MNL-2 ===
- Rakhine United

Dissolved entries

- ~~Yarmanya United~~
- ~~Dagon Port~~

=== Name changed ===
- Mahar United to Sagaing United

== Teams by province ==
Rank	Province	Number	Teams
1	Yangon	5	Yangon United, Thitsar Arman, Dagon Star United, ISPE and Yangon City
1	(Mandalay Region) Mandalay	1	Yadanarbon
3	(Shan State) Taunggyi	1	Shan United
3	(Bago Region) Bago	1	Hanthawady United
3	(Ayeyarwady Region) Pathein	1	Ayeyawady United
3	(Sagaing Region) Sagaing	1	Sagaing United
3	(Chin State) Hakha	1	Chinland
3	(Mandalay Region) Nay Pyi Taw	1	Myawady

=== Stadiums ===
Locations of the 2026-27 Myanmar National League

Club	Home City	Stadium	Capacity
Ayeyawady United	Pathein	Kyauk Tie Stadium	6,000
Hantharwady United	Bago	Grand Royal Stadium	4,000
I.S.P.E	Yangon	Thiha Dipa Stadium	3,000
Shan United	Taunggyi	Taunggyi Stadium	7,000
Yadanarbon	Mandalay	Bahtoo Stadium	17,000
Yangon City	Yangon	Padaythar Stadium	5,000
Yangon United	Yangon	Yangon United Sports Complex *	3,500

(*) – Artificial Field. Not eligible for AFC matches. Play at Thuwunna Stadium.

== Managerial changes ==
=== Pre-season ===
Team	Outgoing manager	Manner	Date of vacancy	Replaced by	Date of appointment

== Personnel and kits ==
Note: Flags indicate national team as has been defined under FIFA eligibility rules. Players and coaches may hold more than one non-FIFA nationality.

Team	Manager	Captain	Kit manufacturer	Kit sponsor	
Team	Manager	Captain	Kit manufacturer	Domestic	Other sponsor(s)
Ayeyawady United	(Myanmar national football team) Nyi Nyi Tun	(Myanmar national football team) Lu Min Chit	(Myanmar) Pro Sport	(Myanmar) A Plus	List: Front: None; Back: None; Sleeves: None; Shorts: None
Chinland	(Myanmar national football team) KB Siang Cung Lian	(Myanmar national football team) Thet Ko Ko	(Myanmar) X One	Myanmar Flower	List: Front: 77 Mart; Back: None; Sleeves: None; Shorts: None
Dagon Star United	(Myanmar national football team) Chit Naing	(Myanmar national football team) Thiha Zaw	(Myanmar) M21 Sport	(Myanmar) Super Seven Stars	List: Front: None; Back: None; Sleeves: None; Shorts: None
Hantharwady United	(Myanmar national football team) Myo Min Tun	(Myanmar national football team) Win Moe Kyaw	(Myanmar) Art of Sports	(Myanmar) Grand Royal	List: Front: None; Back: None; Sleeves: None; Shorts: None
ISPE	(Myanmar national football team) Zarni Tun	(Myanmar national football team) Khaing Ye Win	(Myanmar) M21 Sport	(Myanmar)	List: Front: None; Back: None; Sleeves: None; Shorts: None
Myawady	(Myanmar national football team) Kyaw Thu Aung Myint Tun	(Myanmar national football team) Maung Maung Win	(Myanmar) Rhino	(Myanmar)	List: Front: None; Back: None; Sleeves: None; Shorts: None
Sagaing United	(Myanmar national football team) Zaw Linn Tun	(Myanmar national football team) Htet Zaw Htun	(Myanmar) APE	(Myanmar)	List: Front: None; Back: Max Energy; Sleeves: None; Shorts: None
Shan United	(Myanmar national football team) Aung Naing	(Myanmar national football team) Nanda Kyaw	(Myanmar) M21 Sport	(Myanmar) Alpine	List: Front: PUBG; Back: None; Sleeves: None; Shorts: None
Thitsar Arman	(Myanmar national football team) Paw Tun Kyaw	(Myanmar national football team) Min Maw Oo	(Myanmar) Art of Sport	(China) Honor	List: Front: None; Back: None; Sleeves: None; Shorts: None
Yadanarbon	(Myanmar national football team) Min Tun Lin	(Myanmar national football team) Suan Lam Mang	(Myanmar) M21 Sport	(South Korea) Samsung	List: Front: Myint Myint Khin, Koyo Lubricants, Alpine, Century Mandalay, Mingalar Mandalay; Back: Manmyotaw , AIMA , Sweety Home, Royal-D; Sleeves: AYA Sompo Insurance, Joker; Shorts: None
Yangon City	(Myanmar national football team) Aung Kyaw Tun	(Myanmar national football team) Win Naing Tun	(Thailand) Ego Sport	(Myanmar) Shan Pae Poke (ရှမ်းပဲပုတ်)	List: Front: SOLXN , EM, Hey Play; Back: King, Anti-Aging & Beauty, Golden Gate Global Myanmar , Burma Beauty; Sleeves: None; Shorts: None
Yangon United	(Myanmar national football team) Khin Maung Lwin	(Myanmar national football team) David Htan	(Myanmar) Glory Sport	(Myanmar) FNI	List: Front: None; Back: None; Sleeves: None; Shorts: None

1. Interim.
2. Apparel made by team.
3. Apparel used for other competition.

== Foreign players ==
Each team can register an seven number of foreign players.

- Players named in **bold** indicates the player was registered during the mid-season transfer window.
- Former players named in italics are players that were out of squad or left the club within the season, after the pre-season transfer window, or in the mid-season transfer window, and at least had one appearance.

Note: Flags indicate national team as has been defined under FIFA eligibility rules. Players may hold more than one non-FIFA nationality.

Team	Player 1	Player 2	Player 3	Player 4	Player 5	Player 6	Player 7	Former players
Ayeyawady United								
Chinland	(Benin) Yao Marc Degbe	(Burkina Faso) Bagaya Halidou	(Cameroon) Sadou Idris Djingui	(Ghana) Anane Philip	(Ghana) Thomas Gyireh	(Guinea) Sylla Djibril		
Dagon Star United	(Cameroon) Émile Messo'o	(Cameroon) Eric Cantona	(Cameroon) Patrick Edubat	(Ivory Coast) Kekere Moukailou				
Hanthawaddy United								
I.S.P.E								
Myawady								
Sagaing United	(Ghana) Isaac Quansah							
Shan United	(Brazil) Edson	(France) Rodrigue Nanitelamio	(Ghana) Everett Boateng	(Ghana) Mark Sekyi	(Ghana) Stephen Owusu	(Russia) Daniel Tokarev		
Thitsar Arman								
Yadanarbon	(Brazil) Neto	(Brazil) Vitinho	(Ghana) Adobah Foster	(Guinea) Djibril Fandjé Touré	(Italy) Felipe Ferrareze	(Japan) Akito Saito		
Yangon City	(Brazil) Gilmar Alcântara	(Brazil) Pedrão	(Japan) Haruki Yamamura	(Japan) Ryuji Hirota	(Japan) Seigou Tsuchiya	(Portugal) Gilson Costa	(Senegal) Karim Samb	
Yangon United	(Brazil) Thiago Tomais	(Cameroon) Guy Michel	(Cameroon) Moustapha Djidjiwa	(Japan) Aoto Saito	(Liberia) Albert Robert Korvah	(Liberia) Theo Nimely		

== Standings ==
=== League table ===
Pos	Team	Pld	W	D	L	GF	GA	GD	Pts	Qualification or relegation
1	Yangon City	6	4	2	0	11	6	+5	14	Qualification to the 2027–28 AFC Challenge League
2	Dagon Star United	7	5	1	1	17	6	+11	16	possible Preliminary stage to the 2027–28 AFC Challenge League
3	Yangon United	5	4	0	1	16	6	+10	12	
4	Shan United	4	3	1	0	9	2	+7	10	
5	Yadanarbon	7	3	1	3	11	9	+2	10	
6	Sagaing United	7	3	1	3	12	14	−2	10	
7	ISPE	6	2	1	3	13	15	−2	7	
8	Hantharwady United	5	2	1	2	4	6	−2	7	
9	Thitsar Arman	6	1	2	3	10	11	−1	5	
10	Chinland	6	1	1	4	9	11	−2	4	
11	Ayeyawady United	5	1	0	4	5	18	−13	3	Relegation to MNL-2
12	Myawady	7	0	1	6	5	17	−12	1	Relegation to MNL-2

Updated to match(es) played on 28 October 2026. Source:
Rules for classification: Season in progress: 1) Points; 2) Goal difference; 3) Goals scored; End of season: 1) Points; 2) Head-to-head points; 3) Head-to-head goal difference; 4) Goals scored.

=== Position by round ===
Team ╲ Round	1	2	3	4	5	6	7	8	9	10	11	12	13	14	15	16	17	18	19	20	21	22
Ayeyawady United	3	6	8			11																
Chinland	10	12	11			10																
Dagon Star United	1	1	1		1	2																
Hanthawady United	11	9	10			7																
ISPE	9	11	9			6																
Myawady	5	10	12			12																
Sagaing United	12	5	7			8																
Shan United	8	3	2			3																
Thitsar Arman	6	7	5			9																
Yadanarbon	4	4	3			4																
Yangon City	7	8	6			1																
Yangon United	2	2	4			5																

Qualification for the AFC Challenge League stage
Relegation to MNL-2

Source: Myanmar National League 2025

Team ╲ Round	1	2	3	4	5	6	7	8	9	10	11	12	13	14	15	16	17	18	19	20	21	22
Ayeyawady United	W	L	L		L	L																
Chinland	L	L	D	L	W	L																
Dagon Star United	W	W	D	W	W	L	W															
Hantharwady United	L	D	L	W		W																
ISPE	L	L	D	W		W	L															
Myawady	D	L	L		L	L	L															
Sagaing United	L	W	D	L	L	W	W															
Shan United	D	W	W			W																
Thitsar Arman	D	D	W	L	L	L																
Yadanarbon	W	D	W	L	W	L	L															
Yangon City	D	D	W	W	W	W																
Yangon United	W	W	L			W	W															

Source: Myanmar National League 2025

=== Results ===
Home \ Away	AYU	CHL	DSU	HTU	ISP	MWD	SGU	SHU	TSM	YAD	YGC	YGU
Ayeyawady United			0–5		2–1				1–3	1–5		1–4
Chinland						5–1				1–2	1–2	1–5
Dagon Star United				2–0					1–0	4–1		
Hanthawaddy United		1–0						0–2		1–0		
I.S.P.E							2–4			2–1		
Myawady								0–4		0–2	1–2	
Sagaing United			2–4			2–1			2–1			
Shan United			1–0									
Thitsar Arman				2–2	2–3	2–2						
Yadanarbon												
Yangon City							3–1	2–2		0–0		
Yangon United					4–3		2–0				1–2	

Legend: Blue = home team win; Yellow = draw; Red = away team win.
For upcoming matches, an "a" indicates there is an article about the rivalry between the two participants.

== Matches ==
Fixtures and results of the M League 2026–27 season. Source:

Week 1

28 August 2026	Chinland	1-2	Yadanarbon	Yangon
15:30 UTC+06:30	Yao Marc Degbe 89'		Aung Kyaw Aye 45+1'; Vitinho 62'	Stadium: YUSC Stadium

28 August 2026	Thitsar Arman	2-2	Myawady	Yangon
15:30 UTC+06:30	Saw Myo Zaw 21'; Pyae Sone Aung 38'		Soe Thet Maung 10', 45+2'	Stadium: Thiha Dipa Stadium

29 August 2026	Dagon Star United	2-0	Hanthawady United	Yangon
15:30 UTC+06:30	Thiha Zaw 16'; Yan Kyaw Htwe 89'			Stadium: Thiha Dipa Stadium

29 August 2026	Ayeyawady United	2-1	ISPE	Pathein
15:30 UTC+06:30	Lu Min Chit 27'; Mg Top 30'		Khaing Ye Win 11'	Stadium: Kyauk Taing Stadium

30 August 2026	Yangon United	2-0	Sagaing United	Yangon
15:30 UTC+06:30	Maung Maung Lwin 86'; Moustapha Djidjiwa			Stadium: YUSC Stadium

30 August 2026	Yangon City	2-2	Shan United	Yangon
15:30 UTC+06:30	Aung Kaung Mann 65'; Seigou 90+4'		Owusu 15'; Yamamura 45' (o.g.)	Stadium: Padaythar Stadium

Week 2

4 September 2026	Yangon City	0-0	Yadanarbon	Yangon
15:30 UTC+06:30				Stadium: Padaythar Stadium

4 September 2026	Chinland	1-5	Yangon United	Yangon
15:30 UTC+06:30	Anene Philip 16'		Than Paing 9', 55'; Thiago Tomais 32'; Maung Maung Lwin 64'; Albert Korvah 74'	Stadium: Star City Stadium

5 September 2026	Myawady	0-4	Shan United	Yangon
15:30 UTC+06:30			Edson Junior 11', 30'; Nanda Kyaw 45+2'; Ye Yint Aung 64'	Stadium: Star City Stadium

5 September 2026	Thitsar Arman	2-2	Hanthawady United	Yangon
15:30 UTC+06:30	Naing Win Tun 38'; Shine Wunna Aung 49'		Wai Phyo Zaw 11'; Soe Kyaw Kyaw 84' (pen.)	Stadium: Thiha Dipa Stadium

6 September 2026	Ayeyawady United	0-5	Dagon Star United	Pathein
15:30 UTC+06:30			Thiha Zaw 8', 33'; Patrick 14', 68'; Njoh Eoems 57'	Stadium: Kyauk Taing Stadium

7 September 2026	ISPE	2-4	Sagaing United	Yangon
15:30 UTC+06:30	Kaung Myat Nyein 79'; Mar Tee No 83'		Yar Zar Aung 13', 49'; Kaung Myat Thu 17'; Htoo Wai Yan 55'	Stadium: Thiha Dipa Stadium

Week 3

9 October 2026	ISPE	2-2	Dagon Star United	Yangon
15:30 UTC+06:30	Naing Lin Phyo 58'; Saw Sae Kapaw Say 62'		Thiha Zaw 18'; Ye Yint Phyo 90+2'	Stadium: Thiha Dipa Stadium

9 October 2026	Sagaing United	1-1	Chinland	Yangon
15:30 UTC+06:30	Yazar Aung 15'		Anane Philip 39'	Stadium: YUSC Stadium

10 October 2026	Ayeyawady United	1-3	Thitsar Arman	Pathein
15:30 UTC+06:30	Thuya Min Thant 57'		Saw Myo Zaw 25'; Pyae Sone Aung 46'; Shine Wunna Aung 88'	Stadium: Kyauk Tie Stadium

10 October 2026	Myawady	0-2	Yadanarbon	Yangon
15:30 UTC+06:30			Suan Lam Mang 22', 83' (pen.)	Stadium: Thiha Dipa Stadium

11 October 2026	Yangon United	1-2	Yangon City	Yangon
15:30 UTC+06:30	Than Paing 20'		Pedro 2'; Karim Samb 70'	Stadium: YUSC Stadium

11 October 2026	Hantharwady United	0-2	Shan United	Bago
15:30 UTC+06:30			Mark Sekyi 15'; Edson Junior 52' (pen.)	Stadium: Grand Royal Stadium

Week 4

16 October 2026	Thitsar Arman	2-3	ISPE	Yangon
15:30 UTC+06:30	Shine Wunna Aung 68'; Naing Win Tun 72'		Saw Naing; Saw Sae Kapaw Say 70'; Moe Swe Aung 82'	Stadium: Star City Stadium

17 October 2026	Chinland	1-2	Yangon City	Yangon
15:30 UTC+06:30	Van Hming Chuang 45+4'		Win Naing Tun 19', 62' (pen.)	Stadium: Thiha Dipa Stadium

18 October 2026	Hanthawady United	1-0	Yadanarbon	Bago
15:30 UTC+06:30	Win Moe Kyaw 81'			Stadium: Grand Royal Stadium

18 October 2026	Sagaing United	2-4	Dagon Star United	Yangon
15:30 UTC+06:30	Kyaw Zayar Lin 64'; Wai Yan Lin Thu 66' (o.g.)		Patrick 10'; Njoh Ediom 54'; Thiha Zaw 88'; Yan Kyaw Htwe 90+3'	Stadium: Star City Stadium

Week 5

24 October 2026	Yangon City	3-1	Sagaing United	Yangon
15:30 UTC+06:30	Than Toe Aung 54'; Abdou Karim Samb 81'; Rodrigues 90+5'		Isaac Quansah 57'	Stadium: Padaythar Stadium

24 October 2026	Ayeyawdy United	1-5	Yadanarbon	Pathein
15:30 UTC+06:30	Sai Kham Nyi 45+3'		Vitinho 34'; Htet Phyo Wai 40'; Neto 72' (pen.); Phyo Khant Nyein 85'; Sai Kham Nyi 88' (o.g.)	Stadium: Kyauk Taing Stadium

25 October 2026	Dagon Star United	1-0	Thitsar Arman	Yangon
15:30 UTC+06:30	Thiha Zaw 90+6'			Stadium: Thiha Dipa Stadium

25 October 2026	Chinland	5-1	Myawady	Yangon
15:30 UTC+06:30	Anene Philip 4', 57' (pen.); Hla Phone Oo 61', 88'; Van Bawi Thawng 69'		Khin Kyaw Win 90+4'	Stadium: Star City Stadium

Week 6

30 October 2026	Myawady	1-3	Yangon City	Yangon
15:30 UTC+06:30	Thaw Zin Htwe 40'		Gilmar 26'; Win Naing Tun 45+3' (pen.); Tsuchiya 90+6'	Stadium: YUSC Stadium

30 October 2026	ISPE	2-1	Yadanarbon	Yangon
15:30 UTC+06:30	Ci Yan Poh 26'; Khaing Ye Win 90+1'		Vitinho 11'	Stadium: Thihda Dipa Stadium

31 October 2026	Shan United	1-0	Dagon Star United	Taunggyi
15:30 UTC+06:30	Sa Aung Pyae Ko 26'			Stadium: Taunggyi Stadium

31 October 2026	Ayeyawady United	1-4	Yangon United	Pathein
15:30 UTC+06:30	Htun Htun 90'		Zaw Win Thein 16'; Aung Myo Khant 35'; Than Paing 48'; Pyae Moe 90+4'	Stadium: Kyauk Taing Stadium

1 November 2026	Hanthawady United	1-0	Chinland	Bago
15:30 UTC+06:30	Soe Kyaw Kyaw 36'			Stadium: Grand Royal Stadium

1 November 2026	Sagaing United	2-1	Thitsar Arman	Yangon
15:30 UTC+06:30	Quansah 14'; Si Thu Phyo 87'		Ya Kaung Satt 90'	Stadium: Thiha Dipa Stadium

Week 7

21 November 2026	Sagaing United	2-1	Myawady	Yangon
15:30 UTC+06:30	Nay Lin Soe 36'; Yar Zar Aung 71'		Thiha Aung 23'	Stadium: Thuwunna Stadium

21 November 2026	Yangon United	4-3	ISPE	Yangon
15:30 UTC+06:30	Korvah 16'; Than Paing 19'; Zaw Win Thein 31'; Kaung Khant Zaw 48' (o.g.)		Ci Yan Poh 25'; Khaing Ye Win 35'; Moe Swe Aung 52'	Stadium: YUSSC Stadium

22 November 2026	Dagon Star United	4-1	Yadanarbon	Yangon
15:30 UTC+06:30	Moukailou 7'; Yan Kyaw Htwe 35'; Aung Thiha 37'		Thu Rain Tun 90+2'	Stadium: Thuwunna Stadium

23 November 2026	Yangon City	v	Hanthawady United	Yangon
15:30 UTC+06:30				Stadium: Star City Stadium

23 November 2026	Chinland	v	Ayeyawady United	Yangon
15:30 UTC+06:30				Stadium: Thuwunna Stadium

25 November 2026	Shan United	v	Thitsar Arman	Taunggyi
15:30 UTC+06:30				Stadium: Taunggyi Stadium

== Season statistics ==
=== Top goalscorers ===
As of 22 November 2026

Rank	Player	Team	Goals
1	(Myanmar) Thiha Zaw	Dagon Star United	6
2	(Myanmar) Than Paing	Yangon United	5
3	(Ghana) Anane Philips	Chinland	4
3	(Myanmar) Yar Zar Aung	Sagaing United	4
4	(Cameroon) Patrick	Dagon Star United	3
4	(Myanmar) Yan Kyaw Htwe	Dagon Star United	3
4	(Brazil) Edson Junior	Shan United	3
4	(Brazil) Vitinho	Yadanarbon	3
4	(Myanmar) Win Naing Tun	Yangon City	3
4	(Myanmar) Soe Thet Maung	Myawady	2
4	(Myanmar) Maung Maung Lwin	Yangon United	2

=== Top assist ===
As of 22 November 2026

Rank	Player	Team	Assists
1	(Myanmar) Win Pyae Maung	ISPE	4
1	(Myanmar) Myat Kaung Khant	Yangon City	4
1	(Myanmar) Maung Maung Lwin	Yangon United 3	4
2	(Cameroon) Patrick Edubat	Dagon Star United	3
2	(Myanmar) Aung Thiha	Dagon Star United	3
2	(Myanmar) Khaing Ye Win	ISPE	3
2	(Myanmar) Zaw Win Thein	Yangon United	3
3	(Myanmar) Hla Tun	Ayeyawady United	2
3	(Benin) Yao Marc Degbe	Chinland	2
3	(Myanmar) Yan Kyaw Htwe	Dagon Star United	2
3	(Myanmar) Ye Yint Phyo	Dagon Star United	2
3	(Myanmar) Min Maw Oo	Thitsar Arman	2
3	(Myanmar) San Naing Oo	Thitsar Arman	2
3	(Myanmar) Kaung Zayar Lin	Sagaing United	2
3	(Myanmar) Thet Paing Htwe	Yadanarbon	2
3	(Myanmar) Yan Naing Oo	Yangon City	2

=== Hat-tricks ===
As of

Player	For	Against	Result	Date

Note

(H) – Home; (A) – Away

=== Clean sheets ===
As of 22 November 2026

Rank	Player	Team	Clean sheets
1	(Myanmar) Hein Htet Soe	Dagon Star United	3
2	(Myanmar) Pyae Phyo Thu	Shan United	2
2	(Myanmar) Pyae Phyo Aung	Yadanarbon	2
3	(Myanmar) Aung Pyae Phyo	Hantharwady United	1
3	(Myanmar) Nay Lin Htet	Hantharwady United	1
3	(Myanmar) Phone Thit Sar Min	Yangon City	1
3	(Myanmar) Sann Satt Naing	Yangon United	1

== See also ==
- 2026-27 Myanmar Women's League
- 2026-27 M League 2
- 2026 MFF Charity Shield
- Myanmar National League Cup
