= 2026 MFF Charity Shield =

2026 MFF Charity Cup
Shan United	Yangon United
1	0
- Date: 25 August 2026
- Venue: Thuwunna Stadium, Yangon
- Referee: Mr. Thura Zaw
- Weather: Rain; 24 °C (75 °F)

The 2026 MFF Charity Shield is the 10th MFF Charity Cup, an annual Myanmar football match played between the winners of the previous season's 2025-26 MNL Champions and 2025 MNL League Cup champions. The match was contested by Shan United, the 2025-26 MNL Champions winners, and Yangon United, champions of the 2025-26 Myanmar National League. It was held at Thuwunna Stadium on 25 August 2026.

This was Yangon United's 7th Cup appearance and Shan United's 5th time Cup appearance, they won Charity Cup for the first time as Kanbawza FC in 2016.

Shan United won the 2026 MFF Charity Cup and they become a most successful in MFF Charity Cup history.

== Match ==
=== Details ===
25 August 2026
17:00 MST

Shan United	1-0	Yangon United
Edson Junior 82'	Report

Thuwunna Stadium, Yangon
Referee: (Myanmar) Mr. Thura Zaw

Shan United	Yangon United

GK	18	(Myanmar) Kyaw Zin Phyo
RB	28	(Ghana) Everret Boteng
CB	3	(Myanmar) Ye Min Thu		(substituted off) 45'
CB	77	(France) Nanitelamio
LB	5	(Myanmar) Nanda Kyaw		(substituted off) 80'
DM	4	(Cameroon) Stephen Owusu		(substituted off) 61'
CM	27	(Ghana) Mark Sekyi
CM	33	(Myanmar) Kyaw Min Oo
LW	7	(Myanmar) Lwin Moe Aung
RW	11	(Myanmar) Ye Yint Aung		(substituted off) 75'
CF	99	(Brazil) Edson Junior	82'
Substitutes:
GK	1	(Myanmar) Pyae Phyo Thu
FW	9	(Brazil) Carlos Damian		(substituted on) 61'
FW	10	(Myanmar) Sa Aung Pyae Ko		(substituted on) 75'
DF	17	(Myanmar) Naung Nauang Soe
FW	21	(Russia) Danil Tokarev
DF	22	(Myanmar) Phyoe Pyae Sone		(substituted on) 45'
MF	24	(Myanmar) Zwe Man Thar
MF	25	(Myanmar) Nyein Chan Aung
DF	44	(Myanmar) Thet Hein Soe		(substituted on) 80'
Manager:
(Myanmar) Mr. Aung Khaing

GK	1	(Myanmar) Zin Nyi Nyi Aung
RB	4	(Myanmar) David Htan		(substituted off) 57'
CB	3	(Brazil) Thiago Tomas
CB	2	(Myanmar) Hein Zeyar Lin	(yellow card) 89'
LB	22	(Myanmar) Min Kyaw Khant
CM	16	(Myanmar) Aung Myo Khant
RW	46	(Myanmar) Kaung Htet Paing		(substituted off) 46'
LW	7	(Myanmar) Maung Maung Lwin	(yellow card) 30'
AM	79	(Myanmar) Zaw Win Thein		(substituted off) 81'
CF	9	(Myanmar) Than Paing
CF	19	(Cameroon) Moustapha Djidjiwa
Substitutes:
GK	75	(Myanmar) San Sat Naing
DF	5	(Myanmar) Kyaw Phyo Wai
MF	8	(Japan) Aoto Saito		(substituted on) 45'
MF	17	(Cameroon) Guy Michel
FW	28	(Myanmar) Thar Yar Win Htet		(substituted on) 81'
MF	23	(Myanmar) Hein Phyo Win		(substituted on) 57'
MF	34	(Myanmar) Chit Aye
DF	50	(Liberia) Theo Nimely
FW	90	(Myanmar) Pyae Moe
Manager:
(Argentina) Mr. Marcelo Cirelli

Man of the match

- Lwin Moe Aung

Match officials

- Assistant referees:
  - (Myanmar) Mr. Zayar Aung
  - (Myanmar) Mr. Nay Myo Tun
- Fourth official: (Myanmar) Mr. Naing Win Aye
- Reserve official: (Myanmar) Mr.
- Match Commissioner: (Myanmar) Mr.

Match rules

- 90 minutes.
- Penalty shoot-out if scores still level.
- Nine named substitutes.
- Maximum of five substitutions.

== Broadcasting ==
The match was broadcast in the Worldwide on Pyone Play Sport Youtube channel.
