= 2025–26 Myanmar National League =

Myanmar National League
- Season: 2025–26
- Dates: 15 August 2025 – 18 March 2026
- Champions: Shan United
- Relegated: Rakhine United; Yarmanya United
- AFC Challenge League: Shan United; Yangon United
- ASEAN Championship: Shan United
- Matches: 132
- Goals: 469 (3.55 per match)
- Top goalscorer: Sa Aung Pyae Ko (17 goals)
- Best goalkeeper: Zin Nyi Nyi Aung (10 matches)
- Biggest home win: Yangon United 5-0 Rakhine United (23 August 2025)
- Biggest away win: Dagon Port 0-9 Yangon United (19 October 2025)
- Highest scoring: 10 goals total Yadanarbon 7-3 Rakhine United (29 September 2025)
- Longest unbeaten run: Shan United (22 matches)
- Longest winless run: Yarmanya United (8 matches)
- Longest losing run: Rakhine United (5 matches)
- All statistics correct as of 9 October 2025.

The 2025–26 Myanmar National League is the 16th season of the Myanmar National League, the top Myanmar professional league for football clubs, since its establishment in 2009.

Shan United are the defending champions, having won their six Myanmar National League title in the previous season. The season reintroduces promoted Yarmanya United.

== Team changes ==
12 teams will compete in the league – eleven teams from the previous season and one team promoted from MNL-2.

=== Promoted from MNL-2 ===
- Chinland (Actually not promoted due to financial situation)
- Yarmanya United

=== Relegated to MNL-2 ===
- Myawady
- Rakhine United (actually not relegated as Chinland was not promoted)

== Teams by province ==
Rank	Province	Number	Teams
1	Yangon	4	Yangon United, Thitsar Arman, Dagon Star United and Dagon Port
2	(Mandalay Region) Mandalay	2	Yadanarbon and ISPE
3	(Shan State) Taunggyi	1	Shan United
3	(Bago Region) Bago	1	Hanthawady United
3	(Ayeyarwady Region) Pathein	1	Ayeyawady United
3	(Sagaing Region) Sagaing	1	Mahar United
3	(Mon State) Mawlamyine	1	Yarmanya United
3	(Rakhine State) Sittwe	1	Rakhine United

== Managerial changes ==
=== Pre-season ===
Team	Outgoing manager	Manner	Date of vacancy	Replaced by	Date of appointment
Yangon United	(Myanmar) Kyaw Dunn	Cancel contract	13 August 2025	(Myanmar) Tin Maung Tun	15 August 2025
Rakhine United	(Myanmar) Kyaw Lwin	Caretaker	6 September 2025	(Myanmar) Min Tun Lin	6 September 2025
Shan United	(Japan) Ono Hiroki	Terminated contract	5 November 2025	(Myanmar) Han Win Aung	6 November 2025
Yangon United	(Myanmar) Tin Maung Tun	Terminated contract	28 December 2025	(Myanmar) Zaw Linn Tun	28 November 2025
Mahar United	(Myanmar) Zaw Linn Tun	cancel contract	28 November 2025	(Myanmar) Nyi Nyi Tun	31 November 2025
Yangon United	(Myanmar) Zaw Linn Tun	Terminated contract	9 January 2026	(Japan) Tetsuro Uki	9 January 2026
Mahar United	(Myanmar) Nyi Nyi Tun	assistant coach	10 January 2026	(Myanmar) Zaw Linn Tun	10 January 2026

== Personnel and kits ==
Note: Flags indicate national team as has been defined under FIFA eligibility rules. Players and coaches may hold more than one non-FIFA nationality.

Team	Manager	Captain	Kit manufacturer	Kit sponsor	
Team	Manager	Captain	Kit manufacturer	Domestic	Other sponsor(s)
Ayeyawady United	(Myanmar national football team) Chit Naing	(Myanmar national football team) Soe Arkar	(Myanmar) Pro Sport	(Myanmar) AYA Bank	List: Front: None; Back: None; Sleeves: None; Shorts: None
Rakhine United	(Myanmar national football team) Min Tun Lin	(Myanmar national football team) Zaw Zaw Naing	(Myanmar) Glory Sport	(Myanmar) Rakhapura	List: Front: None; Back: None; Sleeves: None; Shorts: None
Dagon Port	(Myanmar national football team) Moe Hein Myint	(Myanmar national football team) Naung Naung Soe	(Myanmar) APE	(Myanmar) MK	List: Front: None; Back: None; Sleeves: None; Shorts: None
Dagon Star United	(Portugal national football team) Rui Gregório	(Myanmar national football team) Maung Maung Win	(Myanmar) M21 Sport		List: Front: None; Back: None; Sleeves: None; Shorts: None
Hantharwady United	(Myanmar national football team) Myo Min Tun	(Myanmar national football team) Lar Din Maw Yar	(Myanmar) SCM	(Myanmar) Grand Royal	List: Front: None; Back: None; Sleeves: None; Shorts: None
ISPE	(Myanmar) Aung Khaing	(Myanmar national football team) Khaing Ye Win	(Myanmar) Rhino Sport	(Myanmar) Winner Sport	List: Front: None; Back: None; Sleeves: None; Shorts: None
Mahar United	(Myanmar national football team) Zaw Linn Tun	(Myanmar national football team) Toe Sat Naing	(Myanmar) M21 Sport	(Myanmar)	List: Front: None; Back: None; Sleeves: None; Shorts: None
Shan United	(Myanmar national football team) Han Win Aung	(Myanmar national football team) Nanda Kyaw	(Myanmar) Foxx	(Philippines) SBOTOP	List: Front: None; Back: None; Sleeves: None; Shorts: None
Thitsar Arman	(Myanmar national football team) Paw Tun Kyaw	(Myanmar national football team) Saw Htoo Pwe Moo	(Myanmar) Pro Sport		List: Front: None; Back: None; Sleeves: None; Shorts: None
Yadanarbon	(Myanmar national football team) Myint Ko	(Myanmar national football team) Pyae Moe	(Myanmar) M21 Sport	(Myanmar) Alpine	List: Front: None; Back: None; Sleeves: None; Shorts: None
Yangon United	(Japan national football team) Tetsuro Uki	(Myanmar national football team) David Htan	(Myanmar) Glory Sport	(Myanmar) FNI	List: Front: None; Back: None; Sleeves: 1xBet; Shorts: None
Yarmanya United	(Myanmar national football team) Win Maung	(Myanmar national football team) Saw Myint Naing	(Myanmar) Rhino Sport	(Myanmar) Commando	List: Front: None; Back: None; Sleeves: None; Shorts: None

1. Interim.
2. Apparel made by team.
3. Apparel used for other competition.

== Foreign players ==
Players name in bold indicates the player was registered during the mid-season transfer window.

Team	Player 1	Player 2	Player 3	Player 4	Player 5	Asia player	Former players
Ayeyawady United							
Dagon Port	(Cameroon) Guy Michel	(Cameroon) Arthur Eric Cantona Ndoukomi	(Ghana) Adobah Foster				(Ivory Coast) Kekere Moukailou
Dagon Star United	(Ivory Coast) Kekere Moukailou						
Hanthawaddy United							
I.S.P.E							
Mahar United	(Cameroon) Patrick Edubat	(Ghana) **Isaac Quansah**					
Rakhine United	(Cameroon) Moustapha Djidjiwa		(Cameroon) **Steve Mbarga**	(Cameroon) Émile Messo'o	(Ghana) **Addae Joseph**		
Shan United	(Brazil) Maurício	(Canada) Jordan Hamilton	(Ivory Coast) **Moussa Bakayoko**	(Ghana) Mark Sekyi	(Japan) Yuki Aizu	(Japan) Ryuji Hirota	(Brazil) Efrain Rintaro (Brazil) Matheus Souza
Thitsar Arman							
Yadanarbon							
Yangon United	(Cameroon) Ghislain Mogou	(Liberia) **Blamo Weah**	(Japan) Shuto Asano	(Japan) Rintaro Hama		(Japan) Aoto Saito	(Ghana) Nathaniel Tetteh
Yarmanya United		(Cameroon) Yhaya Abdullah Tanka	(Cameroon) **Emmanuel Tengemo**	(Ghana) Emmanuel Boateng	(Ghana) **Nathaniel Tetteh**	(Japan) Yuya Kuriyama	(Ghana) Addae Joseph (Bhutan) **Pema Zangpo**

== Standings ==
=== League table ===
Pos	Team	Pld	W	D	L	GF	GA	GD	Pts	Qualification or relegation
1	Shan United (Q)	22	18	4	0	66	10	+56	58	Qualification to the 2026–27 AFC Challenge League group stage
2	Yangon United	22	18	3	1	69	7	+62	57	
3	Dagon Star United	22	11	6	5	39	30	+9	39	
4	ISPE	22	9	4	9	35	46	−11	31	
5	Hantharwady United	22	7	7	8	32	34	−2	28	
6	Mahar United	22	7	7	8	39	44	−5	28	
7	Yadanarbon	22	7	5	10	38	38	0	26	
8	Ayeyawady United	22	7	5	10	25	26	−1	26	
9	Thitsar Arman	22	5	9	8	36	38	−2	24	
10	Dagon Port (D)	22	5	7	10	44	62	−18	22	Dissolved at end of season
11	Rakhine United (R)	22	5	4	13	28	54	−26	19	Relegation to MNL-2
12	Yarmanya United (R)	22	1	3	18	17	79	−62	6	Relegation to MNL-2

Source: MNL
Rules for classification: Season in progress: 1) Points; 2) Goal difference; 3) Goals scored; End of season: 1) Points; 2) Head-to-head points; 3) Head-to-head goal difference; 4) Goals scored.
(D) Disqualified; (Q) Qualified for the phase indicated; (R) Relegated

=== Position by round ===
Team ╲ Round	1	2	3	4	5	6	7	8	9	10	11	12	13	14	15	16	17	18	19	20	21	22
Yangon United	5	2	4	3	1	1	1	2	2	2	2	2	2	2	1	1	1	1	2	2	2	2
Shan United	7	4	3	4	4	2	2	1	1	1	1	1	1	1	2	2	2	2	1	1	1	1
Hanthawady United	3	3	2	1	2	4	4	5	6	6	6	4	6	6	4	4	4	4	4	4	4	5
Ayeyawady United	4	8	8	6	7	7	7	7	7	7	7	8	8	8	8	9	7	7	8	8	7	8
Mahar United	6	10	10	7	9	9	10	9	8	8	8	7	7	7	5	5	5	5	5	6	8	6
Dagon Star United	1	1	1	2	3	5	5	6	4	5	3	5	3	3	3	3	3	3	3	3	3	3
Dagon Port	2	7	7	10	10	10	11	11	11	11	11	10	10	10	11	11	11	11	11	10	10	10
Rakhine United	11	12	12	12	12	11	9	10	9	9	10	11	9	9	10	8	9	9	10	11	11	11
Yadanarbon	8	6	5	5	5	3	3	3	3	3	4	6	5	5	7	7	8	8	7	5	6	7
Thitsar Arman	12	9	9	9	6	8	8	8	10	10	9	9	11	10	9	10	10	10	9	9	9	9
Yarmanya United	9	11	11	11	11	12	12	12	12	12	12	12	12	12	12	12	12	12	12	12	12	12
ISPE	10	5	6	8	8	6	6	4	5	4	5	3	4	4	6	6	6	6	6	7	5	4

Qualification for the AFC Challenge League stage
Relegation to MNL-2

Source: Myanmar National League 2025

Team ╲ Round	1	2	3	4	5	6	7	8	9	10	11	12	13	14	15	16	17	18	19	20	21	22
Yangon United	W	W	W	L	W	W	W	W	D	D	W	W	W	W	W	W	W	D	W	W	W	W
Shan United	W	W	W	D	W	W	W	W	W	D	W	D	W	W	W	W	W	D	W	W	W	W
Hanthawady United	W	D	W	W	D	D	L	L	L	D	W	W	L	L	W	D	W	D	L	L	D	L
Ayeyawady United	W	L	L	W	L	D	W	L	D	D	D	L	L	W	L	L	W	W	D	L	W	L
Mahar United	L	L	D	W	L	L	D	W	W	D	L	W	D	W	W	D	D	D	L	L	L	W
Dagon Star United	W	W	W	D	D	L	D	L	W	D	W	L	W	L	W	D	W	W	W	W	D	L
Dagon Port	W	L	L	L	D	L	L	D	L	D	W	D	D	L	L	D	L	D	W	W	L	W
Rakhine United	L	L	L	L	L	W	W	L	W	D	L	L	W	D	L	W	D	L	L	L	D	L
Yadanarbon	L	W	W	D	W	W	L	D	W	D	L	L	D	D	L	L	L	L	W	W	L	L
Thitsar Arman	L	D	L	W	W	L	L	D	L	D	D	L	L	D	W	D	L	D	D	W	D	W
Yarmanya United	L	L	D	L	L	L	L	D	L	L	L	W	L	D	L	L	L	L	L	L	L	L
ISPE	L	W	L	D	D	W	W	W	L	W	L	W	D	L	L	D	L	W	L	L	W	W

Source: Myanmar National League 2025

=== Results ===
Home \ Away	YGU	SHU	RKU	HTU	YAD	YMN	MHU	ISP	DGP	TSM	DSU	AYU
Yangon United		0–0	5–0	1–0	1–0	6–1	4–0	3–0	4–0	2–1	4–0	0–0
Shan United	0–0		3–0	1–0	0–0	5–0	2–1	4–0	0–0	5–2	4–0	3–1
Rakhine United	1–7	0–6		1–2	2–0	4–1	2–2	1–2	1–0	0–0	0–2	1–1
Hanthawaddy United	0–4	0–4	0–0		0–1	6–0	0–0	1–1	5–4	0–0	1–3	1–3
Yadanarbon	2–3	0–2	7–2	1–4		1–1	3–2	3–1	2–2	1–3	2–2	2–1
Yarmanya United	0–6	0–4	1–2	0–1	1–5		2–4	1–2	2–7	0–5	1–5	0–1
Mahar United	0–2	1–5	2–2	2–2	2–1	0–0		4–1	5–2	3–3	2–2	2–1
I.S.P.E	0–5	1–6	4–1	2–2	2–2	5–2	1–0		2–1	3–2	1–1	3–0
Dagon Port	0–9	0–3	5–2	1–4	1–0	5–2	4–4	2–1		3–3	2–2	0–4
Thitsar Arman	2–1	2–3	0–0	1–2	2–4	1–1	3–0	2–1	2–2		2–2	0–0
Dagon Star United	0–1	1–3	1–0	3–0	2–1	0–1	1–0	3–1	3–3	2–0		2–1
Ayeyawady United	0–2	1–3	2–1	1–1	1–0	5–0	1–2	0–1	1–0	0–0	0–2	

Source: Myanmar National League 2024–25
Legend: Blue = home team win; Yellow = draw; Red = away team win.
For upcoming matches, an "a" indicates there is an article about the rivalry between the two participants.

== Matches ==
Fixtures and results of the Myanmar National League 2025–26 season.

Week 1

15 August 2025	Yarmanya United	0-1	Ayeyawady United	YUSC, Yangon
15:45 UTC+06:30			Kaung Khant Kyaw 45+2'

16 August 2025	Rakhine United	1-2	Hanthawady Untied	YUSC, Yangon
15:30 UTC+06:30	Than Kyaw Htay 15'		Kyi Soe 11'; Zaw Zaw Htike 82'

17 August 2025	Yangon United	1-0	Yadanarbon	YUSC, Yangon
16:00 UTC+06:30	Mogou 11'

18 August 2025	Dagon Port	2-1	ISPE	YUSC, Yangon
15:45 UTC+06:30	Cantona 52'; Moukailou 90+1'		Win Pyae Maung 32'

19 August 2025	Dagon Star United	2-0	Thitsar Arman	YUSC, Yangon
16:00 UTC+06:30	Swan Htet 78', 84'

22 November	Mahar United	1-5	Shan United	YUSC, Yangon
16:00 UTC+06:30	Edubat 9'		Sa Aung Pyae Ko 5', 59', 81'; Souza 22'; Thet Wai Moe 90'

Week 2

22 August 2025	Yadanarbon	3-2	Mahar United	YUSC, Yangon
15:45 UTC+06:30	Pyae Moe 10', 43'; Kaung Myat Kyaw 90+4'		Kaung Myat Thu 5', 68'

23 August 2025	Yangon United	5-0	Rakhine Untied	YUSC, Yangon
15:30 UTC+06:30	Arkar Kyaw 20'; Thar Yar Win Htet 52', 60'; Rintaro Hama 64', 75'

23 August 2025	ISPE	3-0	Ayeyawady United	Thiha Dipa Stadium, Yangon
15:30 UTC+06:30	Thein Zaw Thiha 9'; Soe Lin Aung 64'; Saw Lin Htet Ping 84'

24 August 2025	Hanthawady United	0-0	Thitsar Arman	YUSC, Yangon
15:30 UTC+06:30

24 August 2025	Yarmanya United	1-5	Dagon Star United	Thihadipa Stadium, Yangon
15:30 UTC+06:30	Wai Yan Htet 68'		Yan Kyaw Htwe 37'; Zar Nay Ya Thu 41', 49'; Htet Phyo Wai 77', 83'

26 August 2025	Dagon Port	0-3	Shan United	YUSC, Yangon
15:30 UTC+06:30			Jordan Hamilton 27'; Hirota Ruiji 36'; Mark Sekyi 90+4'

Week 3

12 September 2025	Mahar United	0-0	Yarmanya United	Thuwuna Staium, Yangon
15:45 UTC+06:30

13 September 2025	Hanthawady United	5-4	Dagon Port	Thiha Dipa Stadium, Yangon
15:30 UTC+06:30	Than Toe Aung 14'; Aung Myat Thu 41', 45+2', 78'; Kyi Soe 90+4'		Cantona 23', 34', 80'; Lamin Htwe 52'

16 September 2025	Yangon United	3-0	ISPE	YUSC Stadium, Yangon
15:30 UTC+06:30	Hein Zeyar Lin 55'; Kaung Sithu 81'; Nathaniel 90'

13 September 2025	Thitsar Arman	2-4	Yadanarbon	Thuwuna Stadium, Yangon
15:30 UTC+06:30	Min Maw Oo 28'; Saw Myo Zaw 64'		Thet Tun Aung 19'; Pyae Moe 25'; Soe Min Oo 73', 79'

14 September 2025	Dagon Star United	2-1	Ayeyawady United	Thuwuna Stadium, Yangon
15:30 UTC+06:30	Aung Thiha 47'; Suan Lam Mang 65'		Wai Yan Tun 24'

14 September 2025	Shan United	3-0	Rakhine United	Taunggyi Stadium, Taunggyi
15:30 UTC+06:30	Mark Sekyi 33'; Nanda Kyaw 60'; Jordan Hmilton 90'

Week 4

19 September 2025	Hanthawady United	6-0	Yarmanya United	Thiha Dipa Stadium, Yangon
15:45 UTC+06:30	Kyi Soe 18'; Than Toe Aung 29', 56'; Lar Din Maw Yar 72'; Zwe Marn Thar 77'; Win Moe Kyaw 83'

19 September 2025	Dagon Port	0-4	Ayeyawdy United	Thuwunna Stadium, Yangon
15:30 UTC+06:30			Saw Htaw Nay Mue 43'; Khun Kyaw Kyaw 44'; Aung Pyae Phyo 83'; Aung Kyaw Niang 86'

20 September 2025	Shan United	0-0	Yadanarbon	Taunggyi Stadium, Taunggyi
15:30 UTC+06:30

20 September 2025	ISPE	1-1	Dagon Star United	Thuwuna Stadium, Yangon
16:00 UTC+06:30	Thein Zaw Thiha 90+1'		Nyein Chan Aung 79'

21 September 2025	Thitsar Arman	2-1	Yangon United	Thuwuna Stadium, Yangon
16:00 UTC+06:30	Ye Kaung Set 4' (pen.); Saw Myo Zaw 32'		Aoto Saito 88'

22 September 2025	Mahar United	3-2	Rakhine United	Thuwunna Stadium, Yangon
16:00 UTC+06:30	Patrick 7', 45'; Htoo Wai Yan 21'		Moustapha; Khin Kyaw Win 81'

Week 5

27 September 2025	Yarmanya United	0-6	Yangon United	Thuwunna Stadium, Yangon
15:45 UTC+06:30			Mogou 25', 43' (pen.), 49', 56', 63'; Rintaro Hama 90+2'

27 September 2025	ISPE	2-2	Hanthawady United	Thuwunna Stadium, Yangon
15:30 UTC+06:30	Win Pyae Maung 38'; Than Toe Aung 76'		Than Toe Aung 24' (pen.); Kyi Soe 59'

27 September 2025	Shan United	3-1	Ayeyawady United	Taunggyi Stadium, Taunggyi
15:30 UTC+06:30	Sa Aung Pyae Ko 51'; Thet Hein Soe 74'; Moraes 90+3'		Win Htay 84'

28 September 2025	Dagon Star United	3-3	Dagon Port	Thuwuna Stadium, Yangon
16:00 UTC+06:30	Aung Thiha 27', 45'; Htet Phyo Wai 80'		Kekere Moukailou 14', 90+3'; Michel 37'

29 September 2025	Yadanarbon	7-2	Rakhine United	Thuwuna Stadium, Yangon
16:00 UTC+06:30	Thet Tun Aung 21'; Soe Min Oo 28'; Pyae Moe 36'; Nyi Nyi Aung 49'; Kaung Myat Kyaw 82'; Soe Kyaw Kyaw 83', 85'		Than Kyaw Htay 25'; Zin Min Tun 29'; Messo'o 90'

29 September 2025	Thitsar Arman	3-0	Mahar United	Thiha Dipa Stadium, Yangon
16:00 UTC+06:30

Week 6

18 October 2025	Shan United	4-0	Dagon Star United	Taunggyi Stadum, Taunggyi
15:45 UTC+06:30	Aizu Yuki 17'; Myat Kaung Khant 64'; Sa Aung Pyae Ko 77'; Souza 84'

18 October 2025	ISPE	1-0	Mahar United	Thiha Dipa Stadium, Yangon
15:30 UTC+06:30	Saw Sea Ka Paw Say 74'

19 October 2025	Ayeaywady United	1-1	Hantharwady United	Yangon
15:30 UTC+06:30	Hein Htet Aung 15'		Than Toe Aung 59' (pen.)

19 October 2025	Dagon Port	0-9	Yangon United	Thuwuna Stadium, Yangon
16:00 UTC+06:30			Mogou 29', 38', 86', 88'; Arkar Kyaw 32'; Aee Soe 34', 43', 64'; Ye Lin Htet 73'

20 October 2025	Yarmanya United	1-5	Yadanarbon	Thuwuna Stadium, Yangon
16:00 UTC+06:30	Yha Yha 90+2'		Pyae Moe 39', 63'; Wai yan Phyo 45'; Kaung Myat Kyaw 52'; Aung Thurein 53'

20 October 2025	Thitsar Arman	0-3	Rakhine United	Thiha Dipa Stadium, Yangon
16:00 UTC+06:30			Moustapha 76'; Aung Naing Win 84'; Messo'o 90+6'

Week 7

25 October 2025	ISPE	3-2	Thitsar Arman	Thiha Dipa Stadum, Yangon
15:45 UTC+06:30	Sanda Naing 39'; Kaung Myat Nyein 59'; Saw Sea Ka Paw Say 81'		Saw Myo Zaw 75', 77'

25 October 2025	Yangon United	1-0	Hantharwady United	YUSC Stadium, Yangon
15:30 UTC+06:30	Mogou 67'

26 October 2025	Ayeaywady United	1-0	Yadanarbon	Kyauk Tie Stadium, Pathein
15:30 UTC+06:30	Soe Htet Win 8' (o.g.)

27 October 2025	Dagon Star United	2-2	Mahar United	YUSC Stadium, Yangon
16:00 UTC+06:30	Yan Kyaw Htwe 34'; Swan Htet 43'		Aung Hlaing Win 7'; Zaw Yein Tun 71' (o.g.)

27 October 2025	Rakhine United	1-0	Dagon Port	Thiha Dipa Stadium, Yangon
16:00 UTC+06:30	Moustapha 12'

25 November 2025	Yarmanya United	0-4	Shan United	Thiha Dipa Stadium, Yangon
16:00 UTC+06:30			Ye Yint Aung 51'; Mark Sekyi 65'; Jordan Hamilton 42', 52'

Week 8

1 November 2025	Thirsar Arman	1-1	Yarmanya United	YUSC Stadium, Yangon
16:00 UTC+06:30	Myat Phone Khant 90+8'		Phoo Khant Kyaw 45+2'

2 November 2025	Yadanarbon	2-2	Dagon Port	Thiha Dipa Stadum, Yangon
15:45 UTC+06:30	Soe Min Oo 8'; Pyae Moe 22'		Guy Micheal 50'; Cantona 80'

2 November 2025	Dagon Star United	0-1	Yangon United	Thuwunna Stadium, Yangon
15:30 UTC+06:30			Aoto Saito 24'

3 November 2025	Ayeaywady United	1-2	Mahar United	Kyauk Tie Stadium, Pathein
15:30 UTC+06:30	Ti Nyein Minn 14'		Aung Hlaing Win 70'; Patrick 81'

3 November 2025	ISPE	4-1	Rakhine United	Thuwunna Stadium, Yangon
16:00 UTC+06:30	Soe Lin Aung 18'; Than Toe Aung 44'; Kaung Myat Nyein 78'; Mar Tee No 90+1'		Zin Min Tun 57'

6 November 2025	Hanthawady United	0-4	Shan United	Thiha Dipa Stadium, Yangon
16:00 UTC+06:30			Khun Kyaw Zin Hein 23'; Hamilton Jordan 38'; Sa Aung Pyae Ko 62'; Ye Yint Aung 87'

Week 9

23 December 2025	Rakhine United	4-1	Yarmanya United	Thiha Dipa Stadium, Yangon
16:00 UTC+06:30	Moustapha 36', 39', 85'; Kyaw Swar Lin 87'		Hla Min Aung 20'

23 December 2025	Yadanarbon	3-1	ISPE	Thuwunna Stadum, Yangon
15:45 UTC+06:30	Myo Zaw Oo 8', 74'; Pyae Moe 90+4'		Khaing Ye Win 63' (pen.)

24 December 2025	Thitsar Arman	2-3	Shan United	Thuwunna Stadium, Yangon
15:30 UTC+06:30	Saw Myo Zaw 23'; Pyae Sone Aung 84'		Sa Aung Pyae Ko 27', 45+1'; Mark Sekyi 90+4'

24 December 2025	Yangon United	0-0	Ayeyawady United	YUSC Stadium, Yangon
15:30 UTC+06:30

25 December 2025	Hanthawdy United	1-3	Dagon Star United	Thuwunna Stadium, Yangon
16:00 UTC+06:30	Than Toe Aung 28'		Aung Thiha 24', 37'; Pyae Phyo Zaw 45+2' (o.g.)

25 December 2025	Mahar United	5-2	Dagon Port	Thiha Dipa Stadium, Yangon
16:00 UTC+06:30	Kaung Myat Thu 18', 40'; Ar Sar Ko 38'; Patrick 70', 71'		Micheal 76', 81'

Week 10

23 December 2025	Rakhine United	1-1	Ayeyawady United	Thuwunna Stadium, Yangon
16:00 UTC+06:30	Zin Min Tun 61'		Hein Htet Aung 75'

29 December 2025	ISPE	5-2	Yarmanya United	Thiha Dipa Stadum, Yangon
15:45 UTC+06:30	Saw Se Ka Paw 9', 40', 50', 76'; Kaung Myat Nyein 36'		Chan Nyein 13', 28'

30 December 2025	Yadanarbon	2-2	Dagon Star United	Thiha Dipa Stadium, Yangon
15:30 UTC+06:30	Pyae Moe 8'; Myo Zaw Oo 27'		Yan Kyaw Htwe 17'; Thein Naing Zaw 58'

30 December 2025	Dagon Port	3-3	Thitsar Arman	Thuwuna Stadium, Yangon
15:30 UTC+06:30	Guy Michel 12', 63'; Lamin Htwe 52'		Min Maw Oo 18'; Pyae Sone Aung 28', 41'

31 December 2025	Shan United	0-0	Yangon United	Taunggyi Stadium, Taunggyi
16:00 UTC+06:30

31 December 2025	Mahar United	2-2	Hanthawady United	Thuwunna Stadium, Yangon
16:00 UTC+06:30	Patrick 57', 75'		Arkar 32', 44'

Week 11

5 January 2025	Yarmanya United	2-7	Dagon Port	Thuwunna Stadium, Yangon
16:00 UTC+06:30	Cantona 32' (o.g.); Hein Htet Zaw Win 80'		Cantona 4', 37'; Michel 11'; Yar Zar Aung 24'; Tun Tun Thein 45+1', 51'; La Yaung 85'

5 January 2026	Rahine United	0-2	Dagon Star United	Thiha Dipa Stadum, Yangon
15:45 UTC+06:30			Yan Kyaw Htwe 65'; Htet Phyo Wai 90+3'

6 January 2026	Yangon United	4-0	Mahar United	YUSC Stadium, Yangon
15:30 UTC+06:30	Mogou 49'; Rintaro Hama 64', 86'; Kaung Sithu 83'

6 January 2026	Shan United	4-0	ISPE	Taunggyi Stadium, Taunggyi
15:30 UTC+06:30	Ye Yint Aung 1'; Thurein Tun 83'; Myat Kaung Khant 90+3'; Khunn Kyaw Zin Hein 90+4'

6 January 2026	Ayeyawady United	0-0	Thitsar Arman	Thuwunna Stadium, Yangon
16:00 UTC+06:30

7 January 2026	Yadanarbon	1-4	Hanthawady United	Thuwunna Stadium, Yangon
16:00 UTC+06:30	Kaung Myat Kyaw 52'		Pyae Phyo ZZaw 26'; Than Toe Aung 86', 90+4'; Min Htoo Eain Lin 89'

Week 12

11 January 2025	Dagon Star United	0-1	Yarmanya United	Thuwunna Stadium, Yangon
16:00 UTC+06:30			Pema Zangpo 47'

11 January 2026	Thitsar Arman	1-2	Hanthawady United	Thiha Dipa Stadum, Yangon
15:45 UTC+06:30	Pyae Soe Aung 4' (pen.)		Arkar 16'; Than Toe Aung 22'

11 January 2026	Shan United	0-0	Dagon Port	Taunggyi Stadium, Taunggyi
15:30 UTC+06:30

12 January 2026	Rakhine United	1-7	Yangon United	Taunggyi Stadium, Taunggyi
15:30 UTC+06:30	Moustapha 51'		Maung Maung Lwin 19' (pen.), 90+2'; Rintaro Hama 39', 52'; Oakkar Naing 72'; Blamo Weah 78'; Kaung Sithu 81'

13 January 2026	Mahar United	2-1	Yadanarbon	Thuwunna Stadium, Yangon
16:00 UTC+06:30	Arkar Lin Myat 29' (o.g.); Thet Naing 62'		Pyae Moe 90+2' (pen.)

13 January 2026	Ayeyawady United	0-1	ISPE	Thiha Dipa Stadium, Yangon
16:00 UTC+06:30			Win Pyae Maung 37'

Week 13

16 January 2025	Dagon Star United	3-0	Hanthawady United	Thuwunna Stadium, Yangon
16:00 UTC+06:30	Swan Htet 67'; Htet Phyo Wai 70', 90+3'

16 January 2026	Yarmanya United	1-2	Rakhine United	Thiha Dipa Stadum, Yangon
15:45 UTC+06:30	Emmanuel 34'		Aung Kyaw Aye 22'; Moustpha 79'

16 January 2026	Shan United	5-2	Thitsar Arman	Taunggyi Stadium, Taunggyi
15:30 UTC+06:30	Myat Kaung Khant 22'; Ye Yint Aung 24', 82'; Khun Kyaw Zin Hein 32'; Sa Aung Pyae Ko 60' (pen.)		Saw Myo Zaw 45+1', 84'

17 January 2026	Ayeyawady United	0-2	Yangon United	Thihadipa Stadium, Yangon
15:30 UTC+06:30			Aung Myo Khant 34'; Kaung Sithu 90+5'

17 January 2026	ISPE	2-2	Yadanarbon	Thuwunna Stadium, Yangon
16:00 UTC+06:30	Saw Se Ka Paw 39'; Sanda Naing 52'		Soe Min Oo 41'; Samuel Nga Kie 58'

18 January 2026	Dagon Port	4-4	Mahar United	Thuwunna Stadium, Yangon
16:00 UTC+06:30	Myo Thura Tun 9'; Phoe Thauk Kyar 43', 67'; Guy Michel 60'		Thet Naing 47' (pen.), 73'; Kaung Myat Thu 61'; Nay Lin Soe 84'

Week 14

22 January 2025	Rakhine United	0-0	Thitsar Arman	Thihadipa Stadium, Yangon
16:00 UTC+06:30

22 January 2026	Yadanarbon	1-1	Yarmanya United	Thuwunna Stadum, Yangon
15:45 UTC+06:30	Myo Zaw Oo 37'		Emmanuel 72'

23 January 2026	Dagon Star United	1-3	Shan United	Thuwunna Stadium, Yangon
15:30 UTC+06:30	Suan Lam Mang 49'		Hlaing Bo Bo 39'; Sa Aung Pyae Ko 53'; Lin Htet Soe 90+4'

23 January 2026	Yangon United	4-0	Dagon Port	YUSC Stadium, Yangon
15:30 UTC+06:30	Maung Maung Lwin 30'; Aoto Saito 45+2'; Rintaro Hama 48'; Shuto Asano 63'

23 January 2026	Mahar United	4-1	ISPE	Thiha Dipa Stadium, Yangon
16:00 UTC+06:30	Zayar Lin 23'; Issac Quansah 64', 90+2'; Edubat 84'		Kaung Myat Nyein 82'

24 January 2026	Hanthawady United	1-3	Ayeyawady United	Thuwunna Stadium, Yangon
16:00 UTC+06:30	Than Toe Aung 80'		Tun Tun 27', 54', 63'

Week 15

28 January 2025	Yarmanya United	2-4	Mahar United	Thihadipa Stadium, Yangon
16:00 UTC+06:30	Pema Zangpo 72' (pen.); Saw niang 75'		Quansah 36'; Myo Htet Oo 45'; Patrick 66', 90+2'

29 January 2025	Ayeyawady United	0-2	Dagon Stars United	Thiha Dipa Stadium, Yangon
15:45 UTC+06:30			Suan Lam Mang 20', 58'

30 January 2025	ISPE	0-5	Yangon United	Thuwunna Stadium, Yangon
15:30 UTC+06:30			Aoto Saito 36'; Shuto Asano 38'; Kaaung Sithu 59', 68'; Myo Satt Paing 78'

30 January 2025	Dagon Port	1-4	Hanthawady United	Thiha Dipa Stadium, Yangon
15:30 UTC+06:30	Michel 81' (pen.)		Than Toe AUng 29'; Maung Maung Soe 39', 77'; Kaung Khant Kyaw 65'

30 January 2025	Yadanarbon	1-3	Thitsar Arman	YUSC Stadium, Yangon
16:00 UTC+06:30	Saw Myo Zaw 90+4' (o.g.)		Saw Myo Zaw 62', 70', 90+5'

10 February 2025	Rakhine United	0-6	Shan United	Thuwunna Stadium, Yangon
16:00 UTC+06:30			Hirota Ryuji 14'; Khun Kyaw Zin Hein 54'; Bakayoko 60', 90+3' (pen.); Sa Aung Pyae Ko 66'; Thurein Tun 79'

Week 16

4 February 2025	Hanthawady United	1-1	ISPE	Thuwunna Stadium, Yangon
16:00 UTC+06:30	90+8'		Kaung Myat Nyein 43'

4 February 2025	Dagon Port	2-2	Dagon Stars United	Thuwunna Stadum, Yangon
15:45 UTC+06:30	Cantona 44'; Yan Naing Lin 76'		Suan Lam Mang 31', 42'

4 February 2025	Yangon United	6-1	Shan United	YUSC Stadium, Yangon
15:30 UTC+06:30	Weah 43'; Kaung Sithu 60', 61', 80'; Zaw Win Thein 69'; Chit Aye 85'		Ye Win Hlaing 79'

5 February 2025	Mahar United	3-3	Thitsar Arman	Thuwunna Stadium, Yangon
15:30 UTC+06:30	Kaung Zayar Lin 7' (pen.); Toe Sat Naing 53'; Edubat Patrick 82'		Saw Myo Zaw 23'; Shine Wanna Aung 39'; Min Maw Oo 51'

5 February 2025	Rakhine United	2-0	Yadanarbon	Thiha Dipa Stadium, Yangon
16:00 UTC+06:30	Mustapha 6'; Yan Naing Phyo 75'

10 February 2025	Ayeyawady United	1-3	Shan United	Thuwunna Stadium, Yangon
16:00 UTC+06:30	Zin Min Shine 90+3'		Bakayoko 7'; Sa Aung Pyae Ko 16'; Ye Min Thu 47'

Week 17

9 February 2025	Dagon Star United	3-1	ISPE	Thuwunna Stadium, Yangon
16:00 UTC+06:30	Yan Kyaw Htwe 36'; Moe Swe 44'; Suan Lam Mang 90+1'		Win Pyae Maung 70'

9 February 2025	Yarmanya United	0-1	Hanthawady United	Thiha Dipa Stadum, Yangon
15:45 UTC+06:30			Kaung Khant Kyaw 7'

10 February 2025	Yangon United	2-1	Thitsar Arman	YUSC Stadium, Yangon
15:30 UTC+06:30	Maung Maung Lwin 45+3'; Aung Myo Khant 90+6'		Min Maw Oo 44'

10 February 2025	Rakhine United	2-2	Mahar United	Thiha Dipa Stadium, Yangon
15:30 UTC+06:30	Messo'o 31'; Moustapha 87'		Patrick 41'; Myo Htet Oo 42'

14 February 2025	Ayeyawady United	1-0	Dagon Port	Thuwunna Stadium, Yangon
16:00 UTC+06:30	Hein Htet Aung 31'

14 February 2025	Yadanarbon	0-2	Shan United	Thiha Dipa Stadium, Yangon
16:00 UTC+06:30			Thet Wai Moe 11', 32'

Week 18

15 February 2025	Yarmanya United	1-2	ISPE	Thuwunna Stadium, Yangon
16:00 UTC+06:30	Nyi Nyi Aung 3'		Kaung Myat Nyein 81'; Saw Aung Myo Oo 90+4'

15 February 2025	Hanthawady United	0-0	Mahar United	Thiha Dipa Stadum, Yangon
15:45 UTC+06:30

19 February 2025	Ayeyawady United	2-1	Rakhine United	Thuwunna Stadium, Yangon
15:30 UTC+06:30	Ti Nyein Min 23', 41'		Khin Kyaw Win 61'

19 February 2025	Dagon Star United	2-1	Yadanarbon	Thiha Dipa Stadium, Yangon
15:30 UTC+06:30	Yan Kyaw Htwe 56'; Aung Thiha 90+1'		Phyo kahnt Nyein 90+5'

20 February 2025	Yangon United	0-0	Shan United	YUSC Stadium, Yangon
16:00 UTC+06:30

20 February 2025	Thitsar Arman	2-2	Dagon Port	Thuwunna Stadium, Yangon
16:00 UTC+06:30	Saw Myo Zaw 11', 67'		Cantona 21'; Yan Naing Lin 90+5'

Week 19

24 February 2025	Hantharwady United	0-1	Yadanarbon	Thuwunna Stadium, Yangon
16:00 UTC+06:30			Hein Zaw Naing 36'

24 February 2025	Dagon Star United	1-0	Rakhine United	Thiha Dipa Stadium, Yangon
16:00 UTC+06:30	Suan Lam Mang 76'

25 February 2025	Mahar United	0-2	Yangon United	Thiha Dipa Stadum, Yangon
15:45 UTC+06:30			Rintaro Hama 22'; Myo Sett Paing 79'

25 February 2025	ISPE	1-6	Shan United	Thuwunna Stadium, Yangon
15:30 UTC+06:30	Kaung Khant Kyaw 71'		Sa Aung Pyae Ko 17', 68'; Thet Hein Soe 26'; Mark Sekyi 36'; Lin Htet Soe 54', 86'

26 February 2025	Dagon Port	5-2	Yamanya United	Thiha Dipa Stadium, Yangon
15:30 UTC+06:30	Michel 13', 34', 69'; Yar Zar Aung 29', 36'		Chan Nyein 21'; Saw Than Win Htay 87'

26 February 2025	Thitsar Arman	0-0	Ayeyawady United	Thuwunna Stadium, Yangon
16:00 UTC+06:30

Week 20

3 March 2025	Dagon Star United	1-0	Mahar United	Thuwunna Stadium, Yangon
16:00 UTC+06:30	Htet Zaw Tun 21' (o.g.)

3 March 2025	Thitsar Arman	2-1	ISPE	Thiha Dipa Stadium, Yangon
16:00 UTC+06:30	Myat Phone Khant 41'; Pyae Sone Aung 90+2'		Sitt Nyein Chan Oo 64'

4 March 2025	Hanthawady United	0-4	Yangon United	Thuwunna Stadum, Yangon
15:45 UTC+06:30			Hein Zeyar Lin 4', 60'; Maung Maung Lwin 24'; Rintaro Hama 33'

5 March 2025	Yadanarbon	2-1	Ayeyawady United	Thiha Dipa Stadium, Yangon
15:30 UTC+06:30	Lu Min Chit 42'; Kalep 61'		Hein Htet Aung 37'

6 March 2025	Dagon Port	5-3	Rakhine United	Thuwunna Stadium, Yangon
15:30 UTC+06:30	Yar Zar Aung 40', 65'; Cantona 60'; Lamin Htwe 63'; Phoe Thaut Kyar 78'		Zin Min Tun 58'; Mess'o 82', 90+5'

8 March 2025	Shan United	5-0	Yarmanya United	Taunggyi Stadium, Taunggyi
16:00 UTC+06:30	Bakayoko 33'; Ye Yint Aung 37'; Khun Kyaw Zin Hein 55'; Sa Aung Pyae Ko 60', 90+2'

Week 21

9 March 2025	Thitsar Arman	2-2	Dagon Star United	Thuwunna Stadium, Yangon
16:00 UTC+06:30	Shine Wunna Aung 41', 75'		Moukailou 11'; Htet Phyo Wai 77'

10 March 2025	Yadanarbon	2-3	Yangon United	Thiha Dipa Stadium, Yangon
16:00 UTC+06:30	Nay Oo Lwin 45+3'; Pyae Moe 65' (pen.)		Kaung Sithu 1'; Myo Sett Paing 88'; Blamo Weaah 90+4'

11 March 2025	Hanthawady United	0-0	Rakhine United	Thiha Dipa Stadum, Yangon
15:45 UTC+06:30

11 March 2025	ISPE	2-1	Dagon Port	Thunwuuna Stadium, Yangon
15:30 UTC+06:30	Sitt Nyein Chan Oo 67'; Kaung Myat Nyein 77'		Cantona 90+6'

12 March 2025	Shan United	2-1	Mahar United	Taunggyi Stadium , Taunggyi
15:30 UTC+06:30	Khun Kyaw Zin Hein 22'; Sa Aung Pyae Ko 77'		Patrick 64'

13 March 2025	Ayeyawady United	5-0	Yarmanya United	Thuwunna Staium, Yangon
16:00 UTC+06:30	Aung Pyae Phyo 23', 31', 73'; Ti Nyein Min 27'; Wai Yan Tun 79'

Week 22

16 March 2025	Rakhin United	1-2	ISPE	Thuwunna Stadium, Yangon
16:00 UTC+06:30	Zin Min Tun 67' (pen.)		Khaing Ye Win 34' (pen.); Kyaw Zay Ya 79'

16 March 2025	Dagon Port	1-0	Yadanarbon	Thiha Dipa Stadium, Yangon
16:00 UTC+06:30	Naung Naung Soe 45+2'

17 March 2025	Yarmanya United	0-5	Thitsar Arman	Thiha Dipa Stadum, Yangon
15:45 UTC+06:30			Pyae Sone ung 11', 20'; Shine Wunna Aung 24', 90+3' <Myat Phone Khant 50'

17 March 2025	Mahar United	2-1	Ayeyawady United	Thunwuuna Stadium, Yangon
15:30 UTC+06:30	Patrick 18', 45+2'		Thiha 27'

18 March 2025	Shan United	1-0	Hantharwady United	Taunggyi Stadium , Taunggyi
15:30 UTC+06:30	Myat Kaung Khant 18'

18 March 2025	Yangon United	4-0	Dagon Star United	YUSC Staium, Yangon
16:00 UTC+06:30	Kaung Sithu 18', 37'; David Htan 42'; Rintaro Hama 65'

== Season statistics ==
=== Top goalscorers ===
As of 18 March 2026

Rank	Player	Team	Goals
1	(Myanmar) Sa Aung Pyae Ko	Shan United	17
2	(Cameroon) Patrick Edubat	Mahar United	16
3	(Myanmar) Saw Myo Zaw	Thitsar Arman	13
4	(Cameroon) Ghislain Mogou	Yangon United	12
4	(Cameroon) Guy Micheal	Dagon Port	12
4	(Myanmar) Kaung Sithu	Yangon United	12
5	(Myanmar) Than Toe Aung	Hantharwady United	11
5	(Cameroon) Eric Cantona	Dagon Port	11
5	(Myanmar) Pyae Moe	Yadanarbon	11
5	(Japan) Rintaro Hama	Yangon United	11
6	(Cameroon) Moustapha	Rakhine United	10
6	(Myanmar) Htet Phyo Wai	Dagon Star United	10
7	(Myanmar) Saw Se Ka Paw	ISPE	8
7	(Myanmar) Suan Lam Mang	Dagon Star United	8

=== Hat-tricks ===
As of 6 March 2026

Player	For	Against	Result	Date
(Myanmar) Aung Myat Thu	Hantharwady United	Dagon Port	5–4 (H)	13 September 2025
(Cameroon) Cantona	Dagon Port	Hantharwady United	4–5 (A)	13 September 2025
(Cameroon) Mogou	Yangon United	Yarmanya United	6–0 (A)	27 September 2025
(Cameroon) Mogou	Yangon United	Dagon Port	9–0 (A)	19 October 2025
(Myanmar) Aee Soe	Yangon United	Dagon Port	9–0 (A)	19 October 2025
(Myanmar) Sa Aung Pyae Ko	Shan United	Mahar United	5–1 (A)	22 November 2025
(Cameroon) Moustapha	Rakhine United	Yarmanya United	4–1 (H)	23 December 2025
(Myanmar) Saw Se Ka Paw	ISPE	Yarmanya United	5–2 (H)	29 December 2025
(Myanmar) Tun Tun	Ayeyawady United	Hantharwady United	3–1 (A)	24 January 2026
(Ghana) Michael	Dagon Port	Yarmanya United	5–2 (H)	26 February 2026
(Myanmar) aung Pyae Phyo	Ayeyawady United	Yarmanya United	5–0 (H)	13 March 2026

Note

(H) – Home; (A) – Away

=== Clean sheets ===
As of 18 March 2026

Rank	Player	Team	Clean sheets
1	(Myanmar) Zin Nyi Nyi Aung	Yangon United	10
2	(Myanmar) Kyaw Zin Phyo	Shan United	9
2	(Myanmar) San Set Naing	Yangon United	9
3	(Myanmar) Soe Arkar	Ayeyawady United	6
4	(Myanmar) Khant Min Thant	Rakhine United	5
5	(Myanmar) Hein Htet Soe	Dagon Star United	4
5	(Myanmar) Naing Lin Aung	Thitsar Arman	4
6	(Myanmar) Nay Lin Htet	Hanthawady United	2
6	(Myanmar) Sai Thiha Naing	Ayeyawady United	2
6	(Myanmar) Pyae Phyo Aung	Hanthawady United	2
6	(Myanmar) Paing Zin	I.S.P.E	2
6	(Myanmar) Aung Ko latt	Mahar United	2
6	(Myanmar) Pyae Phyo Thu	Shan United	2
6	(Myanmar) Pyae Phyo Aung	Shan United	2
6	(Japan) Yuya Kuriyama	Yarmanya United	2
7	(Myanmar) A Zin Hmue	Dagon Port	1
7	(Myanmar) Aung Pyae Phyo	Dagon Star United	1
7	(Myanmar) Aung Myint Myat	Dagon Star United	1
7	(Myanmar) Zarni Hein	I.S.P.E	1
7	(Myanmar) Yan Lin Tun	Yadanarbon	1
7	(Myanmar) Arkar Lin Myat	Yadanarbon	1

== See also ==
- 2025–26 MNL-2
- 2025–26 Myanmar Women's League
- 2025 MNL League Cup
