= 2026–27 M League 2 =

M League 2
- Season: 2026–27
- Dates: 15 October 2026 - March 2027
- Matches: 28
- Goals: 96 (3.43 per match)
- Top goalscorer: Tun Naing Soe (9 goals)
- Best goalkeeper: Chan Nyein Kyaw; Min Khant Soe (3 matches)
- Biggest home win: Myanmar University 9-0 Elite Kings (15 October 2026)
- Biggest away win: Asia Lione 0-3 Rakhine United (23 October 2026)
- Highest scoring: Myanmar University 8-2 Enjoy Brothers (25 October 2026)
- Longest winning run: Rakhine United (5 matches)
- Longest unbeaten run: Myanmar University; Royal Dagon (6 matches)
- Longest winless run: 3 teams
- Longest losing run: Enjoy Brother

The 2026–27 Myanmar League Two, is the 14th season of the M League 2, the second division league for football clubs in Myanmar since its founding in 2012. The champion and 1st runner-up will promote to the M League. Two teams from the bottom will relegate to the M League Amateur tournament. The league has a total of 10 teams.

== Teams ==
The 2026-27 M League 2, organized by the Myanmar Football Federation and the Myanmar National League Committee, will kick off on October 15 with 10 participating teams.

Matches for this season of M League 2 will be held at Padonmar Stadium, University Ground, and South Dagon Ground, and the full match schedule will be announced soon.

Participating teams must comply with the Asian Football Confederation's (AFC) Professional Club Licensing Criteria. Furthermore, reviews and verifications involving relevant stakeholders have already been conducted to prevent any salary and contract disputes between management/coaching staff and players.

To ensure the successful organization of the 2026-27 M League 2 season, a coordination meeting with club officials was held on September 29, and vetting procedures were also carried out for two new clubs: Elite Kings FC and Asia Lions FC.

The M League II 2025-26 championship title was won by Chinland FC, while Myawady FC secured the runner-up position.

== Teams by province ==
| Rank | Province | Number | Teams |
|---|---|---|---|
| 1 | Yangon | 6 | Asia Lions, Elite King, Enjoy Brother, Junior Lions, Royal Dagon and Myanmar University |
| 2 | (Rakhine State) Rakhine | 1 | Rakhine United |
| 2 | (Kachin State) Myitkyina | 1 | Manaw |
| 2 | (Mon State) Mawlamyine | 1 | Yarmanya United |
| 2 | (Mandalay Region) Nay Pyi Taw | 1 | VUE Nay Pyi Taw |

== Personnel and sponsoring ==
Note: Flags indicate national team as has been defined under FIFA eligibility rules. Players may hold more than one non-FIFA nationality.

| Team | Head coach | Captain | Kit manufacturer | Shirt sponsor |
|---|---|---|---|---|
| Asia Lions | (Myanmar) U Htet Aung | (Myanmar) Tun Lin Oo | (Myanmar) Kick Sportwear | (Myanmar) Ok$ |
| Elite Kings | (Myanmar) Min Thu | (Myanmar) Thu Rein Moe | (Myanmar) Foxx | (China) BYD |
| Enjoy Brother | (Myanmar) U Shwe Tin | (Myanmar) Phyo Wai Htet | (Myanmar) Fit | |
| Junior Lions | (Myanmar) Aung Moe | (Myanmar) Swan Zar Ni | (Myanmar) Stamina | |
| Manaw FC | (Myanmar) U Si Thu Aung | (Myanmar) Myo Wai Lin | (Myanmar) | (Myanmar) Bahadur Respoke |
| Myanmar University | (Myanmar) Zaw Min | (Myanmar) San Pyae Sone Soe | (Myanmar) Fit | |
| Rakhine United | (Myanmar) Moe Hein Myint | (Myanmar) Zaw Zaw Naing | (Myanmar) X-one | (Myanmar) Rakhapura |
| Royal Dagon | (Myanmar) U Yin Min Aung | (Myanmar) Htun Wai Moe | (Myanmar) Pro Sports | (Myanmar) Glory Goal Construction |
| VUE Nay Pyi Taw | (Myanmar) Naing Naing Lin | (Myanmar) Tin Win Aung | (Myanmar) | |
| Yarmanya United | (Myanmar) U Than Hteik | (Myanmar) San Myint Naing | (Thailand) Grand Sport | |

== Foreign players ==
Each team can register an seven number of foreign players.

- Players named in **bold** indicates the player was registered during the mid-season transfer window.
- Former players named in italics are players that were out of squad or left the club within the season, after the pre-season transfer window, or in the mid-season transfer window, and at least had one appearance.

Note: Flags indicate national team as has been defined under FIFA eligibility rules. Players may hold more than one non-FIFA nationality.

| Team | Player 1 | Player 2 | Player 3 | Player 4 | Player 5 | Player 6 | Player 7 | Former players |
|---|---|---|---|---|---|---|---|---|
| Asia Lion | (Ivory Coast) N'doua telesphore | (Ivory Coast) Loba Antonie virgil | | | | | | |
| Manaw | (Ghana) Yaw Kusi | (Ghana) Addaph Joseph | | | | | | |
| Royal Dagon | (Cameroon) Fils Nani Ahanda | (Cameroon) Frank Achille Nyobe Nyobe | (Cameroon) Germain Achille Messomo | | | | | |

== League table ==
| Pos | Team | Pld | W | D | L | GF | GA | GD | Pts | Qualification or relegation |
|---|---|---|---|---|---|---|---|---|---|---|
| 1 | Rakhine United | 6 | 5 | 0 | 1 | 18 | 7 | +11 | 15 | Promotion to the 2027-28 M League |
| 2 | Myanmar University | 6 | 4 | 1 | 1 | 25 | 5 | +20 | 13 | Promotion to the 2027-28 M League |
| 3 | Royal Dagon | 6 | 3 | 3 | 0 | 13 | 8 | +5 | 12 | |
| 4 | Junior Lions | 5 | 3 | 1 | 1 | 9 | 3 | +6 | 10 | |
| 5 | VUE Naypyitaw | 6 | 3 | 2 | 1 | 7 | 5 | +2 | 11 | |
| 6 | Yarmanya United | 6 | 2 | 3 | 1 | 7 | 6 | +1 | 9 | |
| 7 | Elite Kings | 6 | 1 | 1 | 4 | 6 | 19 | −13 | 4 | |
| 8 | Manaw FC | 6 | 1 | 2 | 3 | 7 | 14 | −7 | 5 | |
| 9 | Asian Lions | 5 | 0 | 1 | 4 | 3 | 10 | −7 | 1 | Relegation to Amature League |
| 10 | Enjoy Brothers | 6 | 0 | 0 | 6 | 7 | 25 | −18 | 0 | Relegation to Amature League |

Updated to match(es) played on 19 November 2026. Source:
Rules for classification: Season in progress: 1) Points; 2) Goal difference; 3) Goals scored; End of season: 1) Points; 2) Head-to-head points; 3) Head-to-head goal difference; 4) Goals scored.
- **(C)** = Champions
- **(P)** = promoted to M League.

== Matches ==
Fixtures and results of the 2026–27 M League 2 season. Source:

Week 1

| 15 October 2026 | **Asia Lions** | **1-3** | **Yarmanya United** | Yangon |
| 15:30 UTC+06:30 | Tun Lin Oo 58' | | Arkar Kyaw 35'; San Myint Naing 38'; Saw Htoo Wai Hlyan Aung 68' | Stadium: YUSC Stadium |

| 15 October 2026 | **University** | **9-0** | **Elite Kings** | Yangon |
| 15:30 UTC+06:30 | Shine Htet Aung (1) 15'; Aung Myint Myat 26', 36'; Win Win Htun 43', 56'; Myu Dan Hkaung 62'; Shine Htet Aung (2) 75'; Than Htet Moe 90+3' | | | Stadium: University Stadium |

| 15 October 2026 | **Manaw** | **1-2** | **VUE Nay Pyi taw** | Yangon |
| 15:30 UTC+06:30 | Khai Pu 90+2' | | Aung Pyae Phyo (1) 17'; Min Min Thu 80' | Stadium: Padonmar Stadium |

| 16 October 2026 | **Enjoy Brothers** | **1-3** | **Royal Dagon** | Yangon |
| 15:30 UTC+06:30 | Sithu Kyaw 63' (pen.) | | Shine Htet Kyaw 24', 50'; Fils Nani Ahanda 42' | Stadium: University Stadium |

| 17 October 2026 | **Rakhine United** | **1-0** | **Junior Lions** | Yangon |
| 15:30 UTC+06:30 | Khant Thu Lin 31' | | | Stadium: University Stadium |

Week 2

| 23 October 2026 | **Asia Lions** | **0-3** | **Rakhine United** | Yangon |
| 15:30 UTC+06:30 | | | Nyi Nyi Tun 22'; Tun Naing Soe 24'; Aung Phyo Thu 86' | Stadium: University Stadium |

| 23 October 2026 | **Elite Kings** | **1-3** | **Junior Lions** | Yangon |
| 15:30 UTC+06:30 | Min Myat Soe 62' | | Shine Htet Aung 19'; Kaung Myat Thu 48'; Swan Zarni 57' | Stadium: Padonmar Stadium |

| 23 October 2026 | **Yarmanya United** | **1-1** | **VUE Nay Pyi taw** | Yangon |
| 15:30 UTC+06:30 | Saw Be Bale 79' | | Min Min Thu 23' | Stadium: YUSC Stadium |

| 25 October 2026 | **University** | **8-2** | **Enjoy Brothers** | Yangon |
| 15:30 UTC+06:30 | Shine Htet Aung(2) 20'; Aung Myint Myat 28', 57', 71' (pen.); Arkar Moe 37'; San Pyae Sone Soe 45+3', 70'; Myu Dan Hkung 85' | | Yee Wai Yan 24', 65' | Stadium: University Stadium |

| 26 October 2026 | **Royal Dagon** | **3-3** | **Manaw** | Yangon |
| 15:30 UTC+06:30 | Fils Nani Ahanda 10', 76'; Sitt Paing Thway 36' | | Min Soe Than 19', 47'; Naw Li Zar 90+3' | Stadium: University Stadium |

Week 3

| 29 October 2026 | **Rakhine United** | **4-2** | **Elite Kings** | Yangon |
| 15:30 UTC+06:30 | Wai Min Htut 49'; Tun Naing Soe 50'; Zaw Zaw Naing 75', 86' (pen.) | | Min Myat Soe 42'; Khun Wunn Htut 76' | Stadium: University Stadium |

| 30 October 2026 | **Asia Lions** | **0-1** | **VUE Nay Pyi Taw** | Yangon |
| 15:30 UTC+06:30 | | | Khun Ye Zaw 43' | Stadium: University Stadium |

| 31 October 2026 | **Enjoy Brothers** | **0-2** | **Junior Lions** | Yangon |
| 15:30 UTC+06:30 | | | Ye Yint Wathone Aung 56'; Swan Zarni 76' | Stadium: University Stadium |

| 31 October 2026 | **Royal Dagon** | **0-0** | **Yarmanya United** | Yangon |
| 15:30 UTC+06:30 | | | | Stadium: Padonmar Stadium |

| 1 November 2026 | **Manaw** | **0-4** | **University** | Yangon |
| 15:30 UTC+06:30 | | | Shine Htet Aung(2) 16'; Win Win Htun 20'; Myu Dan Hkung 59'; Aung Myint Myat 86' | Stadium: Padonmar Stadium |

Week 4

| 5 November 2026 | **Rakhine United** | **1-0** | **VUE Naypyitaw** | Yangon |
| 15:30 UTC+06:30 | Tun Naing Soe 71' | | | Stadium: Padaonmar Stadium |

| 6 November 2026 | **Enjoy Brothers** | **1-2** | **Elite Kings** | Yangon |
| 15:30 UTC+06:30 | Yee Wai Yan 45+2' | | Min Myat Soe 51'; Khun Win Htut 81' | Stadium: University Stadium |

| 6 November 2026 | **Royal Dagon** | **2-1** | **Asia Lions** | Yangon |
| 15:30 UTC+06:30 | Naing Ko Ko 78'; Pajei 85' | | Chit San Ko 9' | Stadium: Padonmar Stadium |

| 7 November 2026 | **Yarmanya United** | **0-2** | **University** | Yangon |
| 15:30 UTC+06:30 | | | Myu Dan Hkaung 48'; Shine Htet Aung(2) 79' | Stadium: Padonmar Stadium |

| 7 November 2026 | **Manaw** | **0-3** | **Junior Lions** | Yangon |
| 15:30 UTC+06:30 | | | Swan Zarni 42' (pen.); Aung Aung 78'; Sa Pyae Sone Oo 80' | Stadium: University Stadium |

Week 5

| 12 November 2026 | **Rakhine United** | **7-1** | **Enjoy Brothers** | Yangon |
| 15:30 UTC+06:30 | Tun Naing Soe 19', 62', 74', 75'; Nyi Nyi Tun 33'; Ye Htet Naing 53'; Soe Wanna Aung 90+3' | | Aung Pyae Sone 45+2' | Stadium: Padaonmar Stadium |

| 12 November 2026 | **Royal Dagon** | **1-1** | **VUE Naypyitaw** | Yangon |
| 15:30 UTC+06:30 | Frank Noybe 26' | | Min Min Thu 4' | Stadium: University Stadium |

| 13 November 2026 | **University** | **1-1** | **Asia Lion** | Yangon |
| 15:30 UTC+06:30 | Nay Naing Oo 41' | | Thiha Zaw 56' | Stadium: University Stadium |

| 14 November 2026 | **Manaw** | **0-0** | **Elite King** | Yangon |
| 15:30 UTC+06:30 | | | | Stadium: YUSC Stadium |

| 14 November 2026 | **Yarmanya United** | **1-1** | **Junior Lions** | Yangon |
| 15:30 UTC+06:30 | San Myint Naing 9' | | Wai Yan Min Oo 72' | Stadium: University Stadium |

Week 6

| 18 November 2026 | **Royal Dagon** | **4-2** | **Rakhine United** | Yangon |
| 15:30 UTC+06:30 | Shine Htet Kyaw 31', 96'; Ye Win Hlaing 43' (pen.); Messomo 46' | | Tun Naing Soe 55', 59' | Stadium: YUSC Stadium |

| 19 November 2026 | **Manaw** | **3-2** | **Enjoy Brother** | Yangon |
| 15:30 UTC+06:30 | Min Soe Than 6', 10'; Oak Thar 88' | | Chit Ko Oo 29'; Htet Arkar 49' | Stadium: YUSC Stadium |

| 19 November 2026 | **University** | **1-2** | **VUE Nay Pyi Taw** | Yangon |
| 15:30 UTC+06:30 | Aung Myint Myat 54' (pen.) | | Khun Ye Zaw 39', 70' | Stadium: University Stadium |

| 20 November 2026 | **Elite King** | **1-2** | **Yarmanya United** | Yangon |
| 15:30 UTC+06:30 | Myat Noe Lwin 81' (o.g.) | | Hla Min AUng 39'; Myat Noe Lwin Template:Goal90+4 | Stadium: University Stadium |

| 22 November 2026 | **Junior Lions** | **v** | **Asia Lions** | Yangon |
| 15:30 UTC+06:30 | | | | Stadium: Padonmar Stadium |

== Season statistics ==
=== Top goalscorers ===
As of 19 November 2026

| Rank | Player | Team | Goals |
|---|---|---|---|
| 1 | Tun Naing Soe | Rakhine United | 9 |
| 2 | Aung Myint Myat | Myanmar University | 7 |
| 3 | Fils Nani Ahanda | Royal Dagon | 3 |
| 3 | Win Win Htun | Myanmar University | 3 |
| 3 | Min Min Thu | VUE Nay Pyi Taw | 3 |
| 3 | Yee Wai Yan | Enjoy Brothers | 2 |
| 3 | Min Soe Than | Manaw | 2 |
| 3 | Shine Htet Kyaw | Royal Dagon | 2 |
| 3 | Pyae Sone Soe | Myanmar University | 2 |
| 3 | Zaw Zaw Naing | Rakhine United | 2 |
| 3 | San Myint Naing | Yarmanya United | 2 |

=== Clean sheets ===
As of 19 November 2026

| Rank | Player | Team | Clean sheets |
|---|---|---|---|
| 1 | Min Khant Soe | Myanmar University | 3 |
| 1 | Chan Nyein Kyaw | Rakhine United | 3 |
| 2 | Shine Htet Kyaw | Junior Lions | 2 |
| 3 | Tun Aung Kyaw | Royal Dagon | 1 |
| 3 | Myo Min Latt | VUE Nay Pyi Taw | 1 |
| 3 | Htoo Kyaw | Yarmanya United | 1 |
| 3 | Htoo Kyaw | Manaw | 1 |
| 3 | Han Htoo Zaw | Elite Kings | 1 |

=== Hat-tricks ===
| Player | For | Against | Result | Date |
|---|---|---|---|---|
| Aung Myint Myat | Myanmar University | Enjoy Brothers | 8-2 | 25 October 2026 |
| Tun Naing Soe | Rakhine United | Enjoy Brothers | 7-1 | 12 November 2026 |
