= IBTC =

IBTC may refer to:

- International Beverages Trading
- Itty Bitty Titty Committee
