= Hein Phyo Win =

Burmese footballer (born 1998)

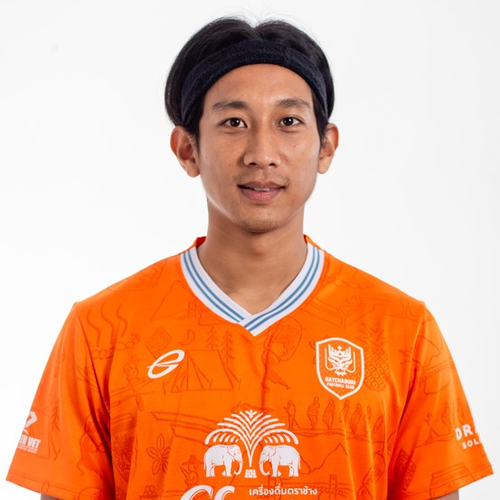

Personal information
- Full name: Hein Phyo Win
- Date of birth: 19 September 1998 (age 28)
- Place of birth: Heho, Myanmar
- Height: 1.75 m (5 ft 9 in)
- Positions: Right-back; left-back

Team information
- Current team: Yangon United

Youth career
- 2016–17: Shan United

Senior career*
Years	Team	Apps	(Gls)
2018–2022	Shan United	61	(3)
2022–2024	Ratchaburi	40	(0)
2024–2026	Shan United	29	(3)
2026	Nakhon Ratchasima	14	(1)
2026–	Yangon United	0	(0)

International career^{‡}
2016	Myanmar U20	2	(0)
2021–	Myanmar	52	(0)
- * Club domestic league appearances and goals as of 28 July 2026 ‡ National team caps and goals as of 28 July 2026

Hein Phyo Win (Burmese: ဟိန်းဖြိုးဝင်း; born 19 September 1998) is a Burmese professional footballer who plays as a right-back for Myanmar National League side Yangon United.

== Club career ==
=== Early year ===
Hein Phyo Win was a product of Shan United Academy. In 2017, Shan United F.C. signed professional contract for Shan United Senior team. He became a wing-back player.

=== Shan United ===
In 2018, Shan United chose Hein Phyo Win for 2018 AFC Cup group stage against Ceres-Negros. He became a first line-up player when Shan United Senior players decline their great form.

=== Ratchaburi F.C. ===
In July 2022, Hein Pyo Win signs with Ratchaburi, filling one of three ASEAN foreign players slot for the first half of 2022-23 Thai League 1 alongside Adam Reed and compatriot Myo Min Latt. He made his competitive debut on 13 August 2022, in the league game against Muangthong United, playing 90 minutes in a 1–0 victory. On 11 September 2022, in a 1–1 draw against Police Tero F.C., he got his first red card after a bad tackle on Marc Landry Babo in the 49th minute. He later got another two red cards in the match against Nakhon Ratchasima F.C. and Khon Kaen United.

=== Yangon United ===
At the start of the 2026-27 season, Hein Phyo Win transferred to Yangon United.

== Club statistics ==
Appearances and goals by club team and year
Club team	Year	Apps	Goals	Assists
Shan United	2018	25	0	6
Shan United	2019	27	0	4
Shan United	2020	28	3	7
Shan United	2022	3	0	1
Ratchaburi	2022/23	27	0	1
Ratchaburi	2023/24	13	0	0
Shan United	2024-25	28	3	7
Shan United	2025-26	11	0	4
Nakhon Ratchasima	2025/26	14	1	1
Yangon United	2026-27	0	0	0
Total		176	7	31

== International ==
As of match played 19 July 2026

Appearances and goals by national team and year
National team	Year	Apps	Goals
Myanmar	2021	8	0
Myanmar	2022	9	0
Myanmar	2023	13	0
Myanmar	2024	11	0
Myanmar	2025	5	0
Myanmar	2026	6	0
Total		52	0

== Honours ==
Myanmar

- Tri-Nation Series (India) runner-up: 2023

Shan United

- Myanmar National League: 2019; runner-up: 2018
- General Aung San Shield runner-up: 2019
