= Yuya Kuriyama =

Japanese footballer

Personal information
- Date of birth: 29 March 2000 (age 26)
- Place of birth: Tokyo, Japan
- Position: Goalkeeper

Team information
- Current team: Yarmanya United
- Number: 1

Youth career
- FC Proud
- Sundai Gakuen High School

College career
Years	Team	Apps	(Gls)
2018–2022	Shizuoka Sangyo University		

Senior career*
Years	Team	Apps	(Gls)
2021–2023	APF Club	14	(0)
2023–2024	Thimphu City	18	(0)
2024	Manila Digger	12	(0)
2025	SC Bengaluru	13	(0)
2025	Samtse		
2025–	Yarmanya United		
- * Club domestic league appearances and goals

Yuya Kuriyama (栗山優也, Kuriyama Yūya; born 29 March 2000) is a Japanese professional footballer who plays as a goalkeeper for Yarmanya United.

== Youth career ==
Kuriyama was born in Tokyo and started playing football at a very young age. In his childhood, he played for a youth team named FC Proud while playing for Sundai Gakuen High School. Up until 2022, he also played college football for the team of Shizuoka Sangyo University. While he was playing, he was diagnosed with cataracts and had to get surgery to remove them.

== Club career ==
=== APF Club ===
With help from the non-profit organization Reale World, Kuriyama was able to play abroad in 2021 during his last year of college, where he signed for Nepal's APF Club. In doing so, he became the first-ever foreign player to play for a Departmental team in the Nepal Super League. At the end of the season, he won the Golden Glove Award at the Aaha! Gold Cup in 2022 after making a vital penalty save during the shootout that handed AFP the title. He signed on for another season from 2022 to 2023.

=== Thimphu City ===
In 2023, he moved from Nepal to nearby Bhutan where he played for league heavyweights Thimphu City FC of the Bhutan Premier League. At the season's end, though Thimphu didn't win the league, Kuriyama won the Golden Glove award. He left the team at the end of the season to pursue a career elsewhere.

=== Manila Digger ===
Kuriyama moved to the Philippines in early 2024 to play for Manila Digger, a club that was joining the Philippines Football League for the 2024 season. Kuriyama made his debut on the opening matchday at Digger narrowly scraped through against Philippine Army, 3–2. He would go on to be the club's starting keeper during the brief spell.
