= Pema Zangpo =

Bhutanese footballer (born 2005)

Personal information
- Date of birth: 24 March 2005 (age 21)
- Place of birth: Gomtu, Bhutan
- Height: 1.67 m (5 ft 6 in)
- Position: Midfielder

Team information
- Current team: Yarmanya United
- Number: 21

Senior career*
Years	Team	Apps	(Gls)
–2024	BFF Academy		
2024–2025	Royal Thimphu College		
2026–	Yarmanya United	3	(1)

International career^{‡}
2024	Bhutan U20	4	(0)
2025	Bhutan U23	4	(0)
2023–	Bhutan	7	(0)
- * Club domestic league appearances and goals as of 22 January 2026 ‡ National team caps and goals as of 18 November 2025

Pema Zangpo (born 24 March 2005) is a Bhutanese professional footballer who plays as a midfielder for Yarmanya United.

== Early life ==
Zangpo was born on 24 March 2005. Born in Gomtu, Bhutan, he has been nicknamed "Vampire".

== Club career ==
Zangpo started his career with Bhutanese side BFF Academy. Following his stint there, he signed for Bhutanese side RTC ahead of the 2025 season. One year later, he signed for Burmese side Yarmanya United.

== International career ==
Zangpo is a Bhutan international. During March, June, October, and November 2025, he played for the Bhutan national football team for 2027 AFC Asian Cup qualification.

== Style of play ==
Zanggo plays as a midfielder. Bangladeshi news website The Deltagram wrote in 2026 that he "grew into a creative and industrious midfielder... attracting attention for his technical ability and vision".
