= Kekere Moukailou =

Ivorian professional footballer (born 1992)

Moukailou
Personal information
- Full name: Kekere Moukailou
- Date of birth: 8 August 1992 (age 34)
- Place of birth: Côte d'Ivoire
- Height: 1.82 m (5 ft 11 1/2 in)
- Position: Center back

Team information
- Current team: Dagon Star United
- Number: 40

Senior career*
Years	Team	Apps	(Gls)
2016	Yadanarbon	22	(4)
2017–2019	Yangon United	75	(6)
2019	Ayeyawady United	21	(1)
2020–2023	Hanthawaddy United	36	(0)
2023–2024	Shan United	14	(1)
2025-2026	Dagon Port	10	(3)
2026–	Dagon Star United	10	(1)
- * Club domestic league appearances and goals as of 29 August 2026

Kekere Moukailou (French pronunciation: [kekere moukailou]; born 8 August 1992) is an Ivorian professional footballer who plays as a defender for Myanmar National League club Dagon Star United.
