= Dagon Port F.C. =

Burmese football club

Dagon Port
- Full name: Dagon Port Football Club
- Founded: 2023; 3 years ago
- Ground: Dagon Port Stadium
- Head coach: U Moe Hein Myint
- League: Myanmar National League
- 2025–26: MNL, 10th
Home colours	Away colours

Dagon Port Football Club (Burmese: ဒဂုံဆိပ်ကမ်း ဘောလုံး အသင်း) is a Burmese professional football club based in Dagon Seikkan Township, founded in 2023.

== History ==
Dagon Port FC was founded in 2023 and played in its inaugural MNL-2 season. At the end of the 2023 MNL-2, they got 3rd position. Dagon Port qualified to 2024 MNL because Myanmar University F.C. did not meet the national league criteria. In December 2024, they changed the name to Dagon Port FC.

== Squad ==
As of 31 August 2026

Note: Flags indicate national team as defined under FIFA eligibility rules; some limited exceptions apply. Players may hold more than one non-FIFA nationality.

No.	Pos.	Nation	Player
1	GK	MYA	Chit Min Htwe
3	DF	MYA	Soe Lin Aung
4	DF	MYA	Kyaw Thiha Zaw
5	DF	MYA	Ye Pyae Sone
6	MF	MYA	Aung Hlaing Win
7	MF	MYA	Thiha Zaw (Captain)
8	MF	CMR	Émile Messo'o
9	FW	MYA	Yan Kyaw Htwe
10	FW	CMR	Arthur Ndoukomi
11	FW	MYA	Phoe Thaut Kyar
17	MF	MYA	Aung Thiha
19		MYA	Sa Khant Chaw

No.	Pos.	Nation	Player
23	GK	MYA	Hein Htet Soe
26	MF	MYA	Ye Yint Phyo
30	DF	MYA	Wai Yan Lin Thu
34	DF	MYA	Thein Tan
44	DF	CIV	Kekere Moukailou
45	DF	MYA	Aung Kyaw Thu
47	DF	MYA	Yan Paing Soe
66	MF	MYA	Tun Tun Thein
70	FW	CMR	Richard Emmanuel Njoh
71	DF	MYA	Zarni Htet
77	FW	MYA	Swan Htet
99	FW	CMR	Patrick Ella

== Honours ==
Dagon Port FC – Honours
Competition	Titles	Title Seasons	Third Place	Third Place Seasons
MNL-2	0	–	1	2023
