= M League =

- Organising body: MFF
- Founded: 16 May 2009; 17 years ago
- First season: 2009
- Country: Myanmar
- Confederation: AFC
- Number of clubs: 12
- Level on pyramid: 1
- Relegation to: M League 2
- Domestic cup: MNL League Cup
- International cup(s): AFC Challenge League; ASEAN Club Championship
- Current champions: Shan United (7th title) (2025-26)
- Most championships: Shan United (7 titles)
- Most appearances: David Htan (336)
- Top scorer: Cézar Augusto (118)
- Broadcasters: Readers Channel; Pyone Play Sports
- Website: www.themnl.com
- Current: 2026-27 season

M League (Burmese: မြန်မာ လိဂ်) often referred to as M League, is the highest level of the men's top professional Myanmar football league system. Contested by 12 clubs, it operates on a system of promotion and relegation with the M2 League. Seasons typically run from August to May, with each team playing 22 games.

== History ==
=== Origins ===
In the past, professional football competition in Myanmar has only existed in a limited form. Premier leagues have been made up of Yangon-based clubs, most of which were affiliated with government ministries. It was only after 1996 when the Premier League (Burmese: ပထမတန်း) was relaunched as the Myanmar Premier League that non-government clubs were invited. Still, the league was based only in Yangon.

The Myanmar Football Federation sought approval from the government to launch a nation wide league in February 2008, and finally received permission to set up private clubs in December of the same year. Each club was permitted to sign at most five foreign players and one foreign coach.

The government granted tax exemptions for an initial three-year period, while each club owner must provide a minimum initial investment of Ks 200 million. The investment covered costs such as salaries, transportation, and equipment, but does not include the club stadiums, which are all nationalized.

=== Myanmar National League (2009–2026) ===
In 2009, the league replaced the Myanmar Premier League with 8 professional clubs representing different regions across the nation. On 16 May 2009, the league launched its inaugural two-month tournament, the Myanmar National League Cup 2009, in preparation for the first full season.

Despite its national ambitions, the league held the MNL Cup 2009 matches in the country's two main stadiums in Yangon due to the lack of adequate facilities elsewhere. On 5 July 2009, Yadanabon FC defeated Yangon United FC in the MNL Cup final to become the first-ever MNL champion.

The league added three clubs for the 2010 season, and one more club joined for the 2011 season, bringing the total to twelve clubs. Two more clubs representing Chin and Shan states participated in the MNL season starting in January 2012.

==== Shan United dominance (2020s) ====
Results of the 'Big Four' during the 2020s
Season	HTU	SHU	YGU	YDB
2020	2	1	4	5
2022	3	1	2	6
2023	3	1	2	10
2024-25	3	1	2	6
Top four	4	4	4	0
Top six	4	4	4	3
out of 6

Starting from the 2019 season, Shan United established themselves as the most powerful force in the Myanmar National League (MNL). In 2020, they secured their third league title, finishing ahead of Hantharwady United in a season affected by the global pandemic.

After a break in the league in 2021, Shan United returned for the 2022 season and pulled off a historic achievement: they finished the entire season undefeated. By winning 15 matches and drawing 3, they proved to be far ahead of their competition. Their defense was particularly strong during this run, giving up only 9 goals in 18 games.

In the 2023–24 season, the club continued to stay at the top, winning their fifth league title. Their home matches at Taunggyi Stadium became legendary for being nearly impossible for away teams to win. During this period, Shan United also became a regular name in Asian continental football, representing Myanmar in the AFC Cup and the AFC Challenge League.

By the end of the 2024-25 season, Shan United made history by winning their 6th league title. More importantly, they became the first club in the professional era of Myanmar football to win four consecutive league titles (2020, 2022, 2023, and 2024–25).

Despite the challenges faced from clubs like Yangon United and Thitsar Arman, Shan United’s financial backing and consistent squad building have maintained their position throughout the mid-2020s.

=== Rebranding to M League (2026–present) ===
In August 2026, the MFF and MNL committees held an event at the Novotel Hotel to announce the rebranding of the Myanmar National League as the M-League. They also announced that the league’s logo had been changed and that the trophy had been redesigned with an international-style design.

Logo of Myanmar League prior to current logo
Old logo (2009-2026)

New logo (2026- )

== Stadiums and locations (2026–27) ==
Ayeyawady United	Chinland	Dagon Star United	Hanthawady United
Kyauk Tie Stadium	Thuwunna Stadium	Thuwunna Stadium	Grand Royal Stadium
Capacity: 6,000	Capacity: 30,000	Capacity: 30,000	Capacity: 4,000
ISPE	Myawady	Sagaing United	Shan United
Thuwunna Stadium	Thuwunna Stadium	Thuwunna Stadium	Taunggyi Stadium
Capacity: 30,000	Capacity: 30,000	Capacity: 30,000	Capacity: 7,000
Thitsar Arman	Yadanarbon	Yangon City	Yangon United
Thuwunna Stadium	Bahtoo Stadium	Padaythar Stadium	YUSC Stadium
Capacity: 30,000	Capacity: 17,000	Capacity: 5,000	Capacity: 3,500

== MNL All STARS results ==
On 24 April, Leeds United announced a post-season tour of Myanmar.

9 May 2018	MNL All-Stars	2–1	(England) Leeds United	Yangon, Myanmar
12:30 BST	Mpande 22'; Chizoba 64' (pen.)	Report	Sáiz 26' (pen.)	Stadium: Thuwunna Stadium; Attendance: 16,910

== Competition format ==
=== Competition ===
There are 12 clubs in the Myanmar National League. During the course of a season (usually from January to September), each club plays the others twice (a double round-robin system), once at their home stadium and once at that of their opponents, for a total of 22 games. Teams receive three points for a win and one point for a draw. No points are awarded for a loss.

Teams are ranked by total points, then goal difference, and then goals scored. If teams are still equal, the head-to-head record between the tied teams is used as the tie-breaker. If a tie persists for the championship or relegation, a play-off match may be organized by the Myanmar Football Federation to decide the final ranking.

=== Promotion and relegation ===
A system of promotion and relegation exists between the Myanmar National League and the MNL-2 (Second Division). At the end of the season, the two lowest-placed teams in the MNL are relegated to MNL-2, while the top two teams from MNL-2 are promoted to the top flight for the following season.

The number of clubs in the league has fluctuated since its founding in 2009. While it began with 8 clubs, it expanded to 12 clubs for much of the 2010s. In recent years, particularly following the 2023 season, the league has worked to stabilize the number of participating clubs at 12 to ensure a competitive balance and sustainable club licensing standards.

== Champions ==
(For Burmese champions before 2009, see Myanmar Premier League)

#	Year	Champions	Runners-up
1	2009–10	Yadanarbon	Delta United (now Ayeyawady United)
2	2010	Yadanarbon	Zeyar Shwe Myay
3	2011	Yangon United	Ayeyawady United
4	2012	Yangon United	Kanbawza FC(now Shan United)
5	2013	Yangon United	Nay Pyi Taw
6	2014	Yadanarbon	Yangon United
7	2015	Yangon United	Yadanarbon
8	2016	Yadanarbon	Yangon United
9	2017	Shan United	Yangon United
10	2018	Yangon United	Shan United
11	2019	Shan United	Ayeyawady United
12	2020	Shan United	Hanthawaddy United
13	2021	Season cancelled due to 21 coup d'état	
14	2022	Shan United	Yangon United
15	2023	Shan United	Yangon United
16	2024–25	Shan United	Yangon United
17	2025–26	Shan United	Yangon United

=== Wins by club ===
Club	Champions	Runners-up	Winning seasons	Runners-up seasons
Shan United	7	2	2017, 2019, 2020, 2022, 2023, 2024–25, 2025–26	2012, 2018
Yangon United	5	7	2011, 2012, 2013, 2015, 2018	2014, 2016, 2017, 2022, 2023, 2024–25, 2025–26
Yadanarbon	4	1	2009–10, 2010, 2014, 2016	2015
Ayeyawady United	0	3		2009, 2011, 2019
Nay Pyi Taw	0	1		2013
Zeyar Shwe Myay	0	1		2010
Hantharwady United	0	1		2020

==== The Invincibles ====
Undefeated champions:

- Shan United in 2019, 2022, 2023, 2024–25 and 2025–26

== Clubs ==
=== 2026–27 season ===
Twelve clubs are competing in the 2026–27 season – top tenth from the previous season and two promoted from the MNL-2.

2026–27 Club	2025-26 Position	First season in National League	Seasons in National League	No. of seasons of current spell in National League	Top division titles	Most recent top division title
Ayeyawady United	8th	2009	17	17	0	-
Chinland	1st (MNL-2)	2014	2	2	0	-
Dagon Star United	3rd	2022	5	5	0	-
Hantharwady United	5th	2009	16	12	0	-
ISPE	4th	2020	7	7	0	-
Myawady	2nd (MNL-2)	2018	6	3	0	-
Mahar United	6th	2018	8	8	0	-
Shan United	1st	2009	17	17	7	2025-26
ThitSar Arman FC	9th	2024	4	4	0	-
Yadanarbon	7th	2009	17	17	4	2016
Yangon City	3rd (MNL-2)	2026-27	1	1	0	-
Yangon United	2nd	2009	16	16	5	2018

=== Seasons in Myanmar National League ===
There are 24 teams that have taken part in 16 Myanmar National League championships that were played from the 2009 season until the 2025–26 season. The teams in bold compete in the Myanmar National League currently. The year in parentheses represents the most recent year of participation at this level.

- **17** seasons: **Yangon United** (2026-27), **Yadanarbon** ((2026-27), **Shan United** (2026-27), **Ayeyawady United** (2026-27)
- **16** seasons: **Hantharwady United** (2026-27)
- **11** seasons: Magwe (2020), Zwekapin United (2020), Rakhine United (2026)
- **10** seasons: Southern Myanmar (2020)
- **9** seasons: **ISPE** (2026-27)
- **8** seasons: Zeyar Shwe Myay (2016), Chin United (2020), **Mahar United** (2026-27)
- **6** seasons: **Myawady** (2026-27)
- **5** seasons: Nay Pyi Taw (2015),Myawady (2025)
- **4** seasons: Manaw Myay (2015),**Dagon Star United** (2026-27), **Chinland** (2026-27)
- **3** seasons: **Thitsar Arman** (2026)
- **2** seasons: Dagon Port (2026),
- **1** season: Yarmanya United (2026), **Yangon City** (2026-27)

== International competitions ==
=== Qualification for the 2025–26 AFC Competitions ===
The number of teams from the Myanmar National League participating in Asian Football Confederation (AFC) competitions is determined by Myanmar's position in the AFC Club Competitions Ranking. For the 2025–26 season, Myanmar is ranked 14th in the East Region, which grants the league two spots in the AFC Challenge League (Asia's third-tier continental competition). League Champions: The winner of the 2024–25 Myanmar National League qualifies automatically for the AFC Challenge League group stage. Cup Winners / League Runners-up: The winner of the MNL League Cup (or the league runners-up if the same team wins both) earns a spot in the AFC Challenge League qualifying play-offs.

=== Current ranking ===
The ranking below takes into account of each association's performance in Asian competitions over the past eight seasons, with the 2025–26 season underway. The final ranking at the end of the 2025–26 season will be used to determine the slot allocation for the 2027–28 AFC club competitions.

As of 20 February 2026, the ranking is as follows:

Ranking				Member association (L: League, C: Cup)	Club points								Total	Active teams (Note: Number of teams still active from association in AFC Champions League Elite, AFC Champions League Two or AFC Challenge League.)	2027–28 Competition Slot Allocation (direct+indirect)			
2025–26	2024–25	Mvmt	Region	Member association (L: League, C: Cup)	2017 (×0.3)	2018 (×0.4)	2019 (×0.5)	2021 (×0.6)	2022 (×0.7)	2023–24 (×0.8)	2024–25 (×0.9)	2025–26 (×1.0)	Total	Active teams	ACLE	ACL2	ACGL	Total
27	27	—	E12	Philippines (L, C)	8.120	5.843	4.782	2.600	0.300	0.600	3.667	4.250	16.965	1/2	0	0+1	0+1	2
29	31	+2	E13	Chinese Taipei (L)	0.000	0.000	0.333	2.000	0.000	5.145	6.050	3.600	14.528	0/2				
30	30	—	E14	Myanmar (L, C)	1.300	4.062	1.600	0.000	0.000	1.640	7.150	2.050	12.612	0/2				
32	34	+1	E15	Mongolia (L, C)	0.000	0.100	0.100	0.000	0.100	5.080	2.200	3.600	9.804	0/2				

== Records ==
=== All-time top scorers ===
As of August 2026

Myanmar League
Rank	Player	Period	Goals	Apps
1	(Brazil) Cezar Augusto	2012–2015, 2017	118	111
2	(Myanmar) Soe Min Oo	2009–2019	109	267
3	(Liberia) Keith Nah	2014, 2015–2016, 2019–2021	93	127
4	(Myanmar) Kyaw Ko Ko	2010–2019	91	182
5	(Guinea) Sylla Sekou	2014–2019, 2023	85	140
6	(Myanmar) Win Naing Soe	2015–2021	77	142
7	(Ivory Coast) Donald Bissa	2016, 2017, 2019–2020	64	74
8	(Myanmar) **Yan Kyaw Htwe**	2013–	64	158
9	(Nigeria) Charles Obi	2010–2013	58	63
10	(Nigeria) Christopher Chizoba	2016–2018	42	72
11	(Myanmar) **Nanda Kyaw**	2013–	34	282
12	(Ghana) **Mark Sekyi**	2018–	22	88
13	(Myanmar) **Sa Aung Pyae Ko**	2016–2018	20	55

Figures for active players (in bold).

=== All-time appearances ===
As of August 2026

Rank	Player	Position	Apps	Goals
1	(Myanmar) **David Htan**	2009–	344	15
2	(Myanmar) **Nanda Kyaw**	2013–	282	34
3	(Myanmar) Zaw Min Tun	2009–2018	271	8
4	(Myanmar) Soe Min Oo	2009–2018	267	109
5	(Myanmar) Thiha Sithu	2009–2020	254	0
6	(Myanmar) Aung Zaw	2009–2021	252	0
7	(Myanmar) Yan Aung Kyaw	2009–2020	246	3
8	(Myanmar) Lar Din Maw Yar	2011–2025	221	3
9	(Myanmar) **Thet Naing**	2009–	220	35
10	(Myanmar) **Thein Than Win**	2009–	211	8

Figures for active players (in bold).

== Player statistics ==
- Youngest player: Myat Kaung Khant (Yadanarbon) — 17 years, 6 months (15 January 2018, Yadanarbon 5–2 Ayeyawady United, 2018 Myanmar National League)
- Oldest player: Chit Myo Hteik (Mahar United) — 44 years (17 March 2026, Mahar United 2-1 Ayeyawady United, 2025-26 Myanmar National League)
- Youngest scorer: Myat Kaung Khant (Yadanarbon) — 17 years, 6 months (15 January 2018, Yadanarbon 5–2 Ayeyawady United, 2018 Myanmar National League)
- Oldest scorer: Chit Myo Hteik (Sagaing United) — 38 years (17 August 2019, Dagon 5—2 Sagaing United, 2019 Myanmar National League)
- Fastest scorer: Kaung Sithu (Yangon United) - 14 seconds (10 March 2026, Yadanarbon FC 2-3 Yangon United, 2025-26 Myanmar National League)
- Most consecutive matches scored: Yadanarbon - 21
- Longest clean sheet: 630 minutes — Kyaw Zin Htet
- Most goals in a season: 28 — Cezar Augusto (Yangon United, 2015)
- Most titles won: 8 — David Htan (Yangon United, Shan United)
- Most seasons appeared: 17 — David Htan (2009–2025)

== Prize money ==
- Champion: Ks. 200,000,000
- Runner-up: Ks. 100,000,000
- Third place: Ks. 70,000,000

== Awards ==
=== Golden Boots ===
Year	Nation	Player	Club	Goals
2025–26	(Myanmar)	Sa Aung Pyae Ko	Shan United	17
2024–25	(Myanmar)	Yan Kyaw Htwe	Yangon United	13
2023	(Ivory Coast)	Bello	Shan United	13
2022	(Myanmar)	Yan Kyaw Htwe	Ayeyawady United	14
2020	(Nigeria)	Raphael Success	Ayeyawady United	16
2019	(Myanmar)	Win Naing Soe	Yadanarbon	18
2018	(Uganda)	Joseph Mpande	Hanthawaddy United	18
2017	(Liberia)	Keith Martu Nah	Ayeyawady United	15
2017	(Nigeria)	Christopher Chizoba	Shan United	15
2016	(Myanmar)	Win Naing Soe	Yadanarbon	16
2016	(Liberia)	Keith Martu Nah	Yadanarbon	16
2016	(Nigeria)	Christopher Chizoba	Ayeyawady United	16
2015	(Brazil)	César Augusto	Yangon United	28
2014	(Brazil)	César Augusto	Yangon United	26
2013	(Brazil)	César Augusto	Yangon United	20
2012	(Serbia)	Saša Ranković	Zeya Shwe Myay	20
2011	(Nigeria)	Charles Obi	Yangon United	18
2010	(Cameroon)	Jean-Roger Lappé-Lappé	Hantharwady United	20
2009–10	(Myanmar)	Soe Min Oo	Shan United	12
2009	(Myanmar)	Yan Paing	Yadanarbon	8

== Coach of the year ==
Season	Coach	Club
2025-26	(Myanmar) Han Win Aung	Shan United
2024–25	(Japan) Ono Hiriki	Shan United
2023	(Myanmar) Han Win Aung	Shan United
2022	(Myanmar) Han Win Aung	Shan United
2020	(Myanmar) Aung Naing	Shan United
2019	(Myanmar) Aung Naing	Shan United
2018	(Myanmar) Myo Min Tun	Yangon United
2017	(Myanmar) Soe Myat Min	Shan United
2016	(Belgium) René Desaeyere	Yadanarbon
2015	(Serbia) Saric	Yangon United
2014	(Myanmar) U Khin Maung Tint	Yadanarbon
2013	(Australia) Eric Williams	Yangon United
2012	(Bulgaria) Ivan Venkov Kolev	Yangon United
2011	(Australia) Eric Williams	Yangon United
2010	(France) Yoan Girard	Yadanarbon
2009	(France) Yoan Girard	Yadanarbon

=== Player of the Year ===
Season	Player	Club
2025–26	(Myanmar) Sa Aung Pyae Ko	Shan United
2024–25	(Myanmar) Ye Yint Aung	Shan United
2023	(Ghana) Mark Sekyi	Shan United
2022	(Myanmar) Nanda kyaw	Shan United
2020	(Myanmar) David Htan	Shan United
2019	(Myanmar) David Htan	Shan United
2018	(Myanmar) Maung Maung Lwin	Yangon United
2017	(Myanmar) Aung Thu	Yadanarbon
2016	(Myanmar) Aung Thu	Yadanarbon
2015	(Myanmar) Aung Thu	Yadanarbon
2014	(Myanmar) Thiha Sithu	Yadanarbon
2013	(Brazil) César Augusto	Yangon United
2012	(Myanmar) Kyi Lin	Yangon United
2011	(Myanmar) Kyaw Ko Ko	Zayar Shwe Myay
2010	(Ivory Coast) Assalé Molo Hilaire	Yadanarbon
2009	(Myanmar) Yan Paing	Yadanarbon

=== Titles won ===
No	Player	Club	Times
1	David Htan	Yangon United, Shan United	8
2	Hein Thiha Zaw	Shan United	7
3	Nanda Kyaw	Shan United	6
4	Yan Aung Kyaw	Yangon United	5
4	Kyi Lin	Yangon United	5
4	Pyae Phyo Aung	Yangon United	5
4	Sithu Aung	Yangon United, Yadanarbon, Shan United	5
4	Ye Min Thu	Shan United	5
5	Khin Maung Lwin	Yangon United	4
5	Kyaw Zin Phyo	Shan United	4
6	Thiha Sithu	Yadanarbon, Shan United	3
6	Yan Aung Win	Yangon United, Yadanarbon	3
6	Myo Min Tun	Yangon United	3
6	Hein Phyo Win	Shan United	3

=== Winning coaches ===
Coach	Club(s)	Wins	Winning years
(Myanmar) Han Win Aung	Shan United	3	2022, 2023, 2025–26
(France) Yoan	Yadanarbon	2	2009, 2010
(Australia) Eric Williams	Yangon United	2	2011, 2013
(Myanmar) Aung Naing	Shan United	2	2019, 2020,
(Bulgaria) Ivan Kolev	Yangon United	1	2012
(Serbia) Sarić / (Myanmar) Tin Maung Tun	Yangon United	1	2015
(Belgium) René Desaeyere	Yadanarbon	1	2016
(Myanmar) Soe Myat Min	Shan United	1	2017
(Myanmar) Myo Min Tun	Yangon United	1	2018
(Japan) Hiroki Ono	Shan United	1	2024–25

== Sponsorship ==
Period	Sponsor	Name
2009–2010	Grand Royal	Grand Royal Myanmar National League
2010–2014	Myanmar	Myanmar National League
2015–2016	Ooredoo	Ooredoo Myanmar National League
2017	Max Cement	Max Cement Myanmar National League
2018–2022	MPT	MPT Myanmar National League
2023–2025		Myanmar National League
2026–	Grand Royal	Grand Royal M League
