= Kyaw Zin Phyo =

Burmese footballer

Personal information
- Full name: Kyaw Zin Phyo
- Date of birth: 1 February 1994 (age 32)
- Place of birth: Shwe Taung, Myanmar
- Height: 1.80 m (5 ft 11 in)
- Position: Goalkeeper

Team information
- Current team: Shan United
- Number: 13

Senior career*
| Years | Team | Apps | (Gls) |
| 2009–2018 | Magway FC | 101 | (0) |
| 2019–2022 | Ayeyawady United | 63 | (0) |
| 2022– | Shan United | 33 | (0) |

International career^{‡}
| 2012 | Myanmar U22 | 5 | (0) |
| 2013–2016 | Myanmar U23 | 5 | (0) |
| 2012– | Myanmar | 38 | (0) |
- * Club domestic league appearances and goals ‡ National team caps and goals as of 21 November 2023

Kyaw Zin Phyo (Burmese: ကျော်ဇင်ဖြိုး; born 1 February 1994) is a Burmese professional footballer who plays as a goalkeeper for Shan United and the Myanmar national team. His performances with the silver medal-winning Myanmar team in the 2015 SEA Games in Singapore were noticeable. He played well, saving many shots against Vietnam and Thailand in the semi-final and final respectively.

== International ==
As of match played 21 November 2023

Appearances and goals by national team and year
| National team | Year | Apps | Goals |
|---|---|---|---|
| Myanmar | 2012 | 1 | 0 |
| Myanmar | 2013 | 2 | 0 |
| Myanmar | 2014 | 2 | 0 |
| Myanmar | 2015 | 5 | 0 |
| Myanmar | 2016 | 11 | 0 |
| Myanmar | 2019 | 4 | 0 |
| Myanmar | 2021 | 3 | 0 |
| Myanmar | 2022 | 4 | 0 |
| Myanmar | 2023 | 6 | 0 |
| Total | | 38 | 0 |

== Honours ==
=== Shan United ===
- MNL: 2025-26, 2024-25,2022-23, 2021-22

=== International ===
- Southeast Asian Games (silver) Silver medal: 2015
- Tri-Nation Series (India)

- Runners-up (1): 2023
