= Ryuji Hirota =

Japanese footballer

Ryuji Hirota 廣田隆治
Personal information
- Full name: Ryuji Hirota
- Date of birth: 16 July 1993 (age 33)
- Place of birth: Takasago, Hyōgo, Japan
- Height: 1.72 m (5 ft 7 1/2 in)
- Position: Winger

Team information
- Current team: Shan United
- Number: 17

Youth career
- 2006–2011: Vissel Kobe Youth

Senior career*
Years	Team	Apps	(Gls)
2012–2013	Vissel Kobe	0	(0)
2012	→ FC Gifu (loan)	22	(1)
2013	→ Gainare Tottori (loan)	28	(1)
2014–2017	Gainare Tottori	112	(10)
2018	Renofa Yamaguchi	0	(0)
2019	Iwate Grulla Morioka	25	(1)
2020–2021	Veertien Mie	4	(0)
2021–2023	Chiangrai United	2	(0)
2021–2022	→ Chiangrai City (loan)	20	(5)
2023–2024	Chainat Hornbill	31	(1)
2024–	Shan United	3	(0)
- * Club domestic league appearances and goals as of 11 November 2023 (UTC)

Ryuji Hirota (廣田 隆治, born 16 July 1993) is a Japanese professional footballer who plays as a winger for Myanmar National League club Shan United

== Career statistics ==
=== Club ===
Updated to 23 February 2020.

Club	Season	League		Emperor's Cup		Other^{1}		Total	
Club	Season	Apps	Goals	Apps	Goals	Apps	Goals	Apps	Goals
FC Gifu	2012	22	1	1	0	-		23	1
Gainare Tottori	2013	28	1	1	0	2	0	29	1
Gainare Tottori	2014	27	4	2	3	-		29	7
Gainare Tottori	2015	32	5	2	0	-		34	5
Gainare Tottori	2016	29	1	2	0	-		31	1
Gainare Tottori	2017	24	0	1	0	-		25	0
Renofa Yamaguchi	2018	0	0	1	0	-		1	0
Iwate Grulla Morioka	2019	25	1	2	0	-		27	1
Career total		187	13	12	3	2	0	201	16

^{1}Includes JFL Relegation Playoffs.
