= Football in Myanmar =

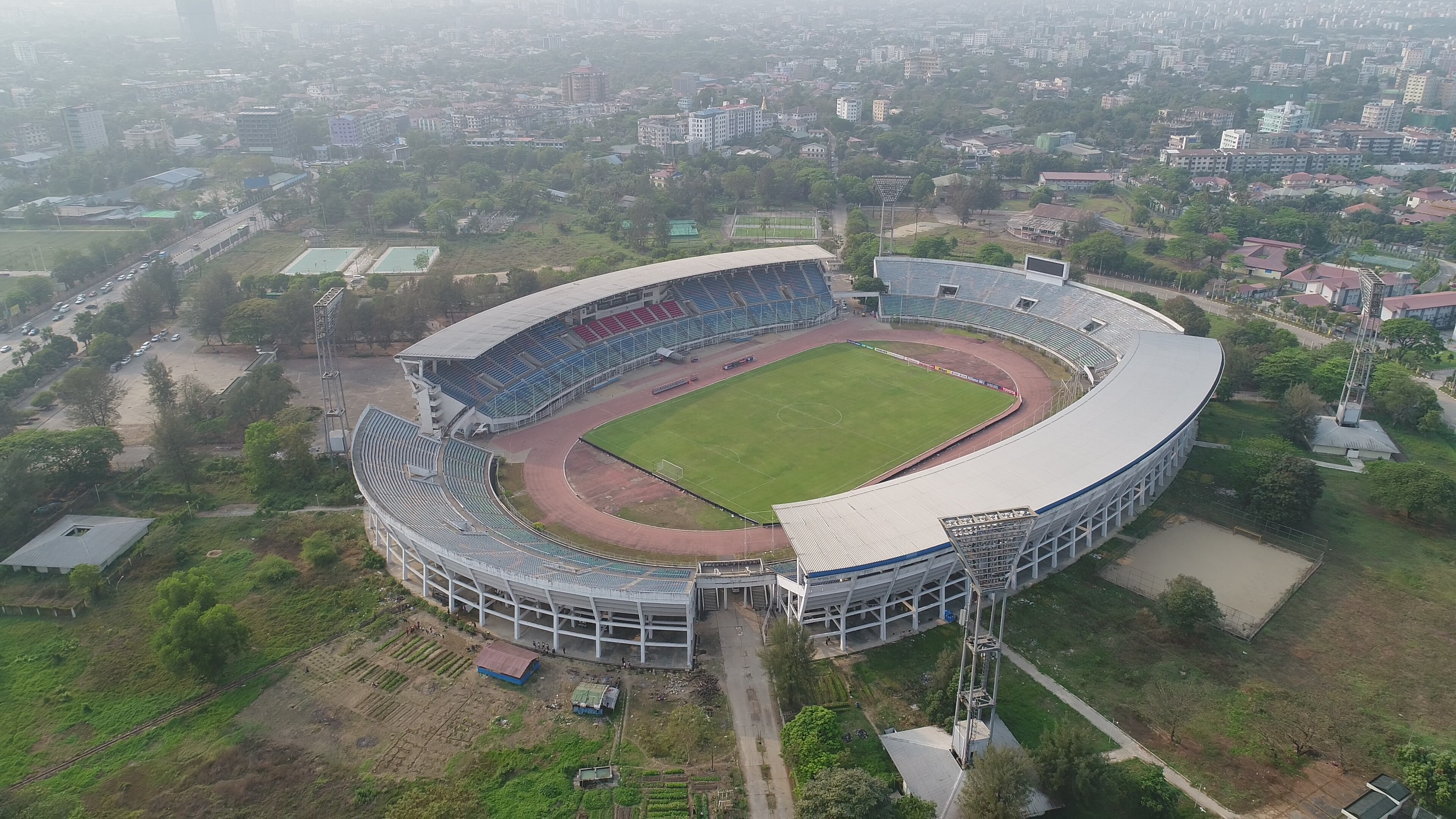
- Country: Myanmar
- Governing body: Myanmar Football Federation
- National teams: Men's national team Women's national team Myanmar national futsal team Myanmar national beach soccer team
- Nicknames: Chinthe; The Asian Lionesses
- First played: 1880s (men)
- Registered players: 1947 (as Burma Football Federation)

National competitions
- Men's competition: FIFA World Cup; AFC Asian Cup; Asian Games; AFF Championship; Sea Games (U-22); Olympic Games; FIFA Futsal World Cup; AFC Futsal Asian Cup; AFC Futsal Club Championship; FIFA Beach Soccer World Cup; Women's competition: FIFA Women's World Cup; AFC Women's Asian Cup; Asian Games(Women); AFF Women's Championship; Sea Games(Women); FIFA Women's Futsal World Cup; AFC Women's Futsal Asian Cup

Club competitions
- League: M League; M2 League; Women's League; Futsal: MFF Futsal League I; MFF Futsal League II; Women's Futsal League; Cup: ML League Cup; Futsal Champion Cup

International competitions
- AFC Challenge League; ASEAN Club Championship; AFC Women's Champions League

Football is the most popular sport in Myanmar. Approximately a quarter of the people in Myanmar are interested in football. The Myanmar Football Federation (MFF) is the governing body of football in Myanmar. It was formed in 1947 as the Burmese Football Federation. The MFF joined FIFA in 1952 and AFC in 1954.

== Early history ==
Football was introduced to Myanmar, then named Burma, by the British colonialists in the 1880s, when explorer James George Scott organised a match between the British and the Burmese in Lanmadaw Township. Football quickly became extremely popular across the country. So much so, that by the 1920s, Burmese started to spread the sport across East Asia. U Kyaw Din, a Burmese born in 1900, wrote one of the earliest books about the sport and promoted it so successfully in Japan that he became a member of the Japanese Football hall of fame posthumously in 2007.

In September 1926, the reportedly first women's football match was organised to raise funds for a charity.

== League system ==
The highest men's football league is the Myanmar National League. The second division is called the MNL-2. The highest women's football league in the country is the Myanmar Women League.

== Pyramid (Football) ==
Level	League(s)
1	M League; 12 clubs – ↓ 2 relegations
2	MNL-2; 9 clubs 2 promotions ↑ - 2 relegations ↓
3	MNL-2; Promotion Amateur Club Tournament; 11 clubs 2 promotions ↑
4	City State Leagues

== Pyramid (Futsal) ==
Level	League(s)
1	MFF Futsal League I 12 clubs 4 relegations ↓
2	MFF Futsal League II; 12 clubs 4 promotions ↑

== Regional and state leagues ==
- Kyaukse Premier League
- Manaw League
- Minbu League
- Yangon Premier League
- Pyinmana League

== Men's national team ==
The Myanmar national team used to be among the top teams in Asia until the early 1970s. They won five consecutive editions of the Southeast Asian Games between 1965 and 1973 and the Asian Games in 1966 and 1970. In 1968, the team finished runners-up at the AFC Asian Cup, only losing to Iran in the final. Most notably, the Burmese national team, as it was called at the time, finished 9th at the 1972 Olympics in Munich after beating Sudan 2:0 and losing just 0:1 to later Bronze medalist Soviet Union. They did win the Fair Play Award at the Games. The national team never qualified for a FIFA World Cup.

== Women's national team ==
The national team is one of the most successful in South East Asia, sitting in the third place of the All-Time Table of the AFF Women's Championship, which they won twice (2004 and 2007). They qualified for the AFC Women's Asian Cup on five occasions, missing only three tournaments, but never made it past the group stages.

== Football clubs in Myanmar ==
In 2009, Yadanarbon F.C. won the first-ever edition of the Myanmar National League, the top-flight football league of Myanmar.

== Football stadiums in Myanmar ==
#	Stadium	City	Capacity	Tenants	Image
1	Thuwunna Stadium	Yangon	50,000		
2	Bogyoke Aung San Stadium	Yangon	40,000		
3	Mandalar Thiri Stadium	Mandalay	30,000		
4	Wunna Theikdi Stadium	Naypyidaw	30,000		
5	Bahtoo Memorial Stadium	Mandalay	17,000		
6	Paung Laung Stadium	Naypyidaw	15,000	Nay Pyi Taw F.C.	

== Attendances ==
The average attendance per top-flight football league season and the club with the highest average attendance:

Season	League average	Best club	Best club average
2017	428	Yadanarbon FC	800

Source: League page on Wikipedia

== See also ==
- Lists of stadiums
