= Sa Aung Pyae Ko =

Burmese footballer (born 1998)

Personal information
- Full name: Sa Aung Pyae Ko
- Date of birth: 1 December 1998 (age 27)
- Place of birth: Taunggyi, Myanmar
- Height: 1.72 m (5 ft 8 in)
- Positions: Forward; right winger

Team information
- Current team: Shan United
- Number: 20

Youth career
- 2018: Shan United

Senior career*
| Years | Team | Apps | (Gls) |
| 2018–2022 | Shan United | 7 | (0) |
| 2022–2024 | Yangon United | 12 | (3) |
| 2024– | Shan United | 36 | (14) |

International career
| 2023– | Myanmar | 1 | (0) |
- * Club domestic league appearances and goals

Sa Aung Pyae Ko (Burmese: စအောင်ပြည့်ကို; born 1 December 1998) is a Burmese professional footballer who plays as a forward and right winger for Myanmar National League club Shan United and the Myanmar national football team.

== Club career ==
=== Shan United and Yangon United ===
Sa Aung Pyae Ko began his career with the youth academy of Shan United. He made his senior debut in 2018. In August 2022, he moved to Yangon United on a free transfer, where he appeared in 12 league matches and scored 3 goals over two seasons.

=== Return to Shan United ===
In January 2024, Sa Aung Pyae Ko rejoined Shan United. During the 2025–26 season, he became a regular starter, scoring 10 goals in 10 league appearances by early 2026. He also represented the club in international competitions, including the 2024–25 ASEAN Club Championship and the 2024–25 AFC Challenge League.

== International career ==
Sa Aung Pyae Ko made his senior international debut for the Myanmar national football team in 2023. He has also been a regular member of the national squad during the 2026 FIFA World Cup qualification and the 2024 ASEAN Championship campaigns.

== Honours ==
Shan United

- Myanmar National League: 2019, 2020, 2024-25, 2025-26
- MFF Charity Cup: 2019, 2020

Individual

- MNL Golden boot: 2025-26
