= Lar Din Maw Yar =

Burmese footballer

Lal Din Mawia
Personal information
- Full name: Lal Din Mawia
- Date of birth: 6 August 1995 (age 31)
- Place of birth: Kalay, Myanmar
- Height: 1.73 m (5 ft 8 in)
- Position: Midfielder

Team information
- Current team: Hanthawaddy United
- Number: 17

Senior career*
Years	Team	Apps	(Gls)
2011–	Hanthawaddy United	221	(3)

International career^{‡}
2019–	Myanmar	22	(0)
- * Club domestic league appearances and goals as of 22 October 2023 ‡ National team caps and goals as of 28 December 2022

Lar Din Maw Yar (born 6 August 1992) is a Burmese footballer who plays for Hanthawaddy United. He is the Hanthawaddy United's Legend.
