= Yan Kyaw Htwe =

Burmese footballer

Personal information
- Full name: Yan Kyaw Htwe
- Date of birth: 13 October 1995 (age 31)
- Place of birth: Loikaw, Myanmar
- Height: 1.76 m (5 ft 9 1/2 in)
- Position: Striker

Team information
- Current team: Dagon Star United
- Number: 29

Senior career*
Years	Team	Apps	(Gls)
2013–2015	Nay Pyi Taw	14	(1)
2016	Manaw Myay	22	(11)
2017–2018	Zwekapin United	31	(8)
2019–2020	Southern Myanmar	25	(6)
2021–2022	Ayeyawady United	16	(14)
2023–2025	Yangon United	38	(20)
2025–	Dagon Star United	12	(4)

International career^{‡}
2023	Myanmar U23 (Wildcard)	4	(1)
2022–2024	Myanmar	1	(0)
- * Club domestic league appearances and goals as of 22:10, 16 January 2026 (UTC) ‡ National team caps and goals as of 1 October 2023

Yan Kyaw Htwe (Burmese: ရန်ကျော်ထွေး; born 2 October 1993) is a Burmese professional footballer who plays as a striker for Dagon Star United.

== Club statistics ==
Appearances and goals by club team and year
Club team	Year	Apps	Goals	Assists
Nay Pyi Taw	2013	3	0	0
Nay Pyi Taw	2014	5	1	0
Nay Pyi Taw	2015	6	0	0
Manaw Myay	2016 MNL-2	22	11	0
Zwekapin United	2017	16	3	0
Zwekapin United	2018	15	5	0
Southern Myanmar	2019	14	2	1
Southern Myanmar	2020	16	4	4
Ayeyawady United	2022	16	14	5
Yangon United	2023	18	9	2
Total		131	49	12

== International ==
As of match played 31 December 2022

Appearances and goals by national team and year
National team	Year	Apps	Goals
Myanmar	2022	1	0
Total		1	0

== Honours ==
=== Individual ===
- Myanmar National League Top Scorer: 2022
