= Moustapha Djidjiwa =

Cameroonian professional footballer

Personal information
- Full name: Moustapha Enock Djidjiwa
- Date of birth: 7 November 1995 (age 31)
- Place of birth: Bertoua, Cameroon
- Height: 1.90 m (6 ft 3 in)
- Position: Forward

Team information
- Current team: Yangon United
- Number: 19

Senior career*
Years	Team	Apps	(Gls)
2014–2015	Botafogo		
2016	Eding Sport		
2017	Dragon Club		
2017	Partizani Tirana	5	(0)
2018	Erzeni	14	(8)
2018–2019	Burreli	9	(3)
2019	Bylis Ballsh	5	(0)
2019–2020	Erzeni	19	(8)
2020–2021	Dinamo Tirana	20	(9)
2025	Rakhine United	20	(10)
2026-	Yangon United		
- * Club domestic league appearances and goals as of 23:14, 29 September 2019 (UTC)

Moustapha Enock Djidjiwa (born 7 November 1995) is a Cameroonian-born Thai professional footballer who plays as a forward for Elite One club Coton Sport.

== Club career ==
In June 2017, Djidjiwa joined Albanian Superliga club Partizani Tirana and was given squad number 25. Then he was included in Sulejman Starova's squad for the 2017–18 UEFA Europa League first qualifying round tie versus Botev Plovdiv. He made his debut in the competition on 29 June by entering in the final 16 minutes of a 3–1 home loss at home.

Djidjiwa began the domestic season on 10 September by making his league debut against Laçi, entering in the final minutes in place of Sodiq Atanda as the team lost 2–0. He scored his first two goals for the team three days later in the first leg of 2017–18 Albanian Cup first round against Naftëtari Kuçovë. Partizani won the match 6–2.

Djidjiwa was released by Partizani in the first days of 2018 after collecting only 5 league appearances with no goals.

Shortly after, Djidjiwa joined Albanian First Division side Erzeni Shijak by penning a contract until the end of 2017–18 season. He debuted on 28 January by playing full-90 minutes in the 2–0 home win over Besa Kavajë. He opened his scoring account in his second appearance for the club on 17 February in the league encounter versus Burreli, netting the opener in an eventual 1–1 away draw.

Later on throughout the season, Djidjiwa become a vital instrumental for Erzeni, netting 8 goals in 14 league appearances as the team finished third in Group B of Promotion round. On 25 April, he signed a contract extension for another year.

On 10 August, Djidjiwa completed a transfer to fellow First Division side Burreli; the club reportedly offered him a very lucrative contract compare to Erzeni. During his time at the club, Djidjiwa made 9 appearances and scored three goals, including a brace against Vora.

On 22 January 2019, Djidjiwa joined Bylis Ballsh on a deal until the end of 2018–19 campaign.

== Career statistics ==
As of 2 December 2018

Club statistics
Club	Season	League			Cup		Europe		Other		Total	
Club	Season	Division	Apps	Goals	Apps	Goals	Apps	Goals	Apps	Goals	Apps	Goals
Partizani Tirana	2017–18	Albanian Superliga	5	0	3	3	1 (Note: All appearance(s) in UEFA Europa League)	0	—		9	3
Erzeni Shijak	2017–18	Albanian First Division	14	8	0	0	—		—		14	8
Burreli	2018–19	Albanian First Division	9	3	1	1	—		—		10	4
Bylis Ballsh	2018–19	Albanian First Division	0	0	0	0	—		—		0	0
Career total			28	11	4	4	1	0	—		33	15
