= International Beverages Trading =

International Beverages Trading Company Group (IBTC)
- Industry: Beverages, trading
- Founded: 1995
- Headquarters: Yangon, Myanmar
- Owner: Aung Moe Kyaw
- Subsidiaries: International Beverages Trading Company; Myanmar Distillery Company
- Website: www.ibtcgroup.com

International Beverages Trading Company Group (abbreviated IBTC) is a major Myanmar-based beverage manufacturing company. IBTC possesses 80% of Myanmar's domestic whiskey market, with a revenue of US$100 million.

IBTC was founded in 1995 with 50 employees by Aung Moe Kyaw, the son-in-law of Thein Tun, chairman of the Myanmar Golden Star Group. It is known for its alcohol brands, including Grand Royal Whiskey, Royal Dry Gin, Eagle Whiskey, Grand Royal Special Reserve Whiskey, Hero Whiskey, and Golden Island Whiskey. The company is a member of the Union of Myanmar Federation of Chamber of Commerce and Industry and Myanmar Agro-base Food Product Manufacturing Association.
