= Yarmanya United F.C. =

Yarmanya United
- Full name: Yarmanya United Football Club
- Founded: 2024; 2 years ago
- Dissolved: 25 March 2026; 6 months ago
- Ground: Mawlamyine
- Owner: U Thin Maung Soe
- Head coach: U Than Htike
- League: Myanmar National League
- 2025–26: MNL, 12th of 12 (relegated)
Home colours	Away colours	Third colours

Yarmanya United Football Club (Burmese: ရာမည ယူနိုက်တက် ဘောလုံး အသင်း) is a Burmese professional football club based in Mawlamyine, founded in 2024. The club competed in the Myanmar National League (MNL) for the first time in the 2025–26 season after earning promotion from the MNL-2, but finished bottom of the league and were relegated.

== History ==
Yarmanya United gained national attention in recent years through its rapid ascent. In the 2024 campaign, they finished as MNL-2 second runner-up, earning promotion to the top league. In addition to the senior team, Yarmanya United U21 actively participates in the Myanmar U21 league.

== Honours ==
- MNL-2
  - 2024 (3rd place)

== 2026-27 squad list ==
As of October 2026

Note: Flags indicate national team as defined under FIFA eligibility rules; some limited exceptions apply. Players may hold more than one non-FIFA nationality.

No.	Pos.	Nation	Player
18	GK	MYA	Naing Lin Oo
31	GK	MYA	Htoo Kyaw
3	DF	MYA	Wuuna Zaw
5	DF	MYA	Win Zaw Hein
6	MF	MYA	Myat Noe Lwin
7	MF	MYA	San Myint Naing
8	MF	MYA	Than Myat Soe
9	FW	MYA	Saw Be Bale
10	FW	MYA	Saw Htoo Wai Hlyan Aung
11	MF	MYA	Hla Min Aung
12	DF	MYA	Nay Lin Htet
13	DF	MYA	Kyaw Wunna
14	DF	MYA	Kyaw Swar Lin
16	MF	MYA	Arkar Phyo

No.	Pos.	Nation	Player
19	FW	MYA	Nyi Nyi Aung
20	MF	MYA	Arkar Kyaw
21	MF	MYA	Yaw Bwan
23	FW	MYA	Chan Oo
22	DF	MYA	Han Thein Soe
28	DF	MYA	Saw Than Win Htay
—	GK	MYA	Zin Waiyan Tun
—	DF	MYA	Aung Ko Zin
—	MF	MYA	Aung Myin Thu
—	DF	MYA	Aung Myo Kyaw
—	DF	MYA	Nay Toe Zaw
—	MF	MYA	Hein Hteik Zaw
—	MF	MYA	Kyaw Zin Hlaing
