= 2024–25 Myanmar National League =

Myanmar National League
- Season: 2024–25
- Dates: 6 July 2024 – 1 March 2025
- Champions: Shan United (6th title)
- Relegated: Myawady
- Challenge League: Shan United; Yangon United
- Matches: 116
- Goals: 390 (3.36 per match)
- Top goalscorer: Yan Kyaw Htwe (13 goals )
- Best goalkeeper: Zin Nyi Nyi Aung (7 clean sheets)
- Biggest home win: Yangon United 5–0 Myawady (13 July)
- Biggest away win: Rakhine United 0–6 Thitsar Arman (10 August)
- Highest scoring: Hantharwady United 4–3 Dagon Port (7 July); Yadanarbon 2–5 Yangon United (11 August); Dagon Port 4–3 Rakhine United (16 August); Dagon Port 1–6 Yangon United (8 September)
- Longest winning run: 5 matches Shan United (10 August – 13 September)
- Longest unbeaten run: 10 matches Shan United (7 July – 13 September); Yangon United (6 July – 14 September)
- Longest winless run: 10 matches Rakhine United (6 July – 15 September)
- Longest losing run: 6 matches Myawady (2 August – 16 September)
- All statistics correct as of 28 January 2025.

The 2024–25 Myanmar National League is the 15th season of first-division domestic football in Myanmar. It will consist of twelve teams, as two teams from the 2023 MNL-2 were promoted. Shan United will play as the defending champion Club for 2024 MNL.

== 2024 MNL Rules ==
2024 MNL will held between the first week of July 2024 and February 2025 according to FIFA football calendars. In this MNL football season will be held at Thuwunna Stadium, YUSC Stadium, Kanbawza Stadium and Pathein Stadium, and under strict security due to ongoing Operation 1027. The league committee allowed the discussion by the clubs to allow the registration of more foreign players, and according to the international standards, a club is allowed to register a maximum of (5+1) and the players to be signed are to be screened only for foreign players whose quality is significantly higher than domestic players.

- transfer window open= January to November 2024
- Myanmar National League Start to close = 6 July 2024 to 28 February 2025

== Clubs ==
=== Changes from previous season ===
==== Promotion and relegation ====
▲ Promoted from 2023 MNL-2	▼ Relegated to 2024 MNL-2
Thitsar Arman; Dagon Port	Chinland; Kachin United

=== Stadiums ===
Yangon :

Thuwunna, YUSC, Padonmar,
State of Shan : Taunggyi
Division of Irrawady : Pathein

Locations of the 2024 Myanmar National League

=== Personnel and sponsoring ===
Note: Flags indicate national team as has been defined under FIFA eligibility rules. Players may hold more than one non-FIFA nationality.

Team	Head coach	Captain	Kit manufacturer	Shirt sponsor
Ayeyawady United	(Myanmar) U Bo Bo Aung	(Myanmar) Yarzar Aung	(Thailand) Pro Sport	
Dagon Port	(Myanmar) U Htet Aung	(Myanmar) Myo Min Latt	(Myanmar) Vigorous / (Myanmar) Fit	(Myanmar) MK Fuel
Dagon Star	(Myanmar) U Min Tun Lin	(Myanmar) Maung Maung Win	(Myanmar) M21	
Hanthawaddy United	(Myanmar) U Myo Min Tun	(Myanmar) Lar Din Maw Yar	(Myanmar) SCM	(Myanmar) Grand Royal
I.S.P.E	(Myanmar) U Chit Naing	(Myanmar) Khaing Ye Win	(Myanmar) Ayeyawady Sports	
Mahar United	(Myanmar) U Zaw Linn Tun	(Myanmar) Kyaw Swar Min	(Myanmar) Like	(Myanmar) Like Products
Myawady	(Myanmar) U Maung Maung Aye	(Myanmar) Aung Thu	(Myanmar) M21	
Rakhine United	(Myanmar) U Moe Hein Myint	(Myanmar) Zaw Zaw Naing	(Myanmar) Rhino Sport	(Myanmar) Rakhapura
Shan United	(Japan) Hiroki Ono	(Myanmar) Hein Thiha Zaw	(Myanmar) Foxx Sports	(Cyprus) 1XGET Sports Media
Thitsar Arman	(Myanmar) U Paw Tun Kyaw	(Myanmar) Saw Htoo Phe Moo	(Myanmar) Rhino Sports	(Myanmar) Sport Bar
Yadanarbon	(Myanmar) U Aung Kyaw Moe	(Myanmar) Hein Nay San	(Myanmar) M21	(Myanmar) Alpine
Yangon United	(Myanmar) U Kyaw Dun	(Myanmar) Yan Naing Oo	(Myanmar) Glory Sport	(Myanmar) ABD Bank

== Foreign players ==
=== Foreign players ===
Players name in bold indicates the player was registered during the mid-season transfer window.

Club	Player 1	Player 2	Player 3	Player 4	Player 5	Asia Player 6	Former Players
Ayeyawady United							
Dagon Port	(Cameroon) Ghislain Constantin Mogou						
Dagon Star United							
Hanthawaddy United							
I.S.P.E F.C.							
Mahar United	(Cameroon) Patrick Gilles Ella Edubat						
Myawady F.C.							
Rakhine United	(Ghana) Joseph Addae	(Ivory Coast) Kekere Moukailou	(Cameroon) Tanka Yhayha Abdullah				(Japan) Fujibayashi Hiroya
Shan United	(Ghana) Mark Sekyi	(Brazil) Efrain Rintaro da Silva	(Cameroon) William Biassi Nyakwe	(Ivory Coast) Moussa Paul Bakayoko		(Japan) Ryuji Hirota	
Thitsar Arman FC							
Yadanarbon							
Yangon United							

== League table ==
Pos	Team	Pld	W	D	L	GF	GA	GD	Pts	Qualification or relegation
1	Shan United (C)	22	20	2	0	65	12	+53	62	Qualification for the AFC Challenge League group stage and ASEAN Club Championship group stage
2	Yangon United (Note: as MNL League Cup winners.)	22	15	6	1	62	20	+42	51	Qualification for the AFC Challenge League qualifying play-offs
3	Hantharwady United	22	13	5	4	34	26	+8	44	
4	Dagon Star United	22	12	4	6	36	22	+14	40	
5	Mahar United	22	10	3	9	44	40	+4	33	
6	Yadanarbon	22	8	7	7	37	39	−2	31	
7	ISPE	22	8	5	9	31	31	0	29	
8	Thitsar Arman	22	7	3	12	39	44	−5	24	
9	Ayeyawady United	22	5	2	15	21	36	−15	17	
10	Dagon Port	22	4	5	13	37	67	−30	17	
11	Rakhine United (R)	22	3	5	14	23	62	−39	14	Relegation to 2025 MNL-2
12	Myawady (R)	22	2	3	17	19	49	−30	9	Relegation to 2025 MNL-2

Source: MNL Forza Football
Rules for classification: 1) Points; 2) Head-to-head points; 3) Head-to-head goal difference; 4) Head-to-head goals scored; 5) Goal difference; 6) Goals scored.
(C) Champions; (R) Relegated

== Results ==
Home \ Away	AYU	DPT	DSU	HTU	ISP	MHR	MWD	RKU	SHU	TSM	YAD	YGU
Ayeyawady United	—	1–2	0–1	0–1	0–1	3–1	0–1	1–2	1–2	0–1	1–1	0–4
Dagon Port	2–4	—	0–3	1–2	0–0	3–2	2–1	4–3	2–4	1–2	1–2	1–6
Dagon Star United	2–1	4–2	—	1–1	2–1	0–1	2–0	1–0	0–0	3–1	1–1	0–3
Hantharwady United	0–2	4–3	1–0	—	3–1	3–2	2–1	2–2	0–2	1–0	1–0	2–2
ISPE	1–0	7–1	2–1	0–0	—	0–1	0–0	5–1	0–5	0–5	2–0	1–3
Mahar United	2–0	3–3	0–3	2–3	2–1	—	4–1	5–1	1–5	4–1	2–0	2–2
Myawady	1–3	4–1	0–2	0–1	0–2	0–1	—	0–0	1–5	3–4	2–2	1–4
Rakhine United	1–1	1–1	1–5	0–4	0–0	1–4	2–1	—	1–4	0–6	2–4	0–5
Shan United	2–0	3–0	2–1	4–0	3–0	3–0	1–0	3–0	—	3–1	2–0	2–2
Thitsar Arman	0–1	3–3	1–2	1–0	1–4	3–3	3–2	1–3	1–4	—	1–2	1–2
Yadanarbon	3–1	3–3	4–2	1–2	1–1	3–2	3–0	3–2	1–5	0–0	—	2–5
Yangon United	4–1	5–1	0–0	1–1	2–1	1–0	5–0	2–0	0–1	3–2	1–1	—

Source: RSSSF
Legend: Blue = home team win; Yellow = draw; Red = away team win.
For upcoming matches, an "a" indicates there is an article about the rivalry between the two participants.

=== Results by round ===
Team ╲ Round	1	2	3	4	5	6	7	8	9	10	11	12	13	14	15	16	17	18	19	20	21	22
Ayeyawady United	D	L	L	L	W	L	L	L	L	D	L	L	W	W	L	L	L	W	W	L	L	L
Dagon Port	L	W	L	L	D	W	W	D	L	L	D	L	L	L	L	W	L	L	L	L	D	D
Dagon Star United	W	L	W	W	L	W	W	D	W	D	W	W	L	W	W	D	W	D	L	L	L	W
Hantharwady United	W	W	D	W	W	W	L	W	W	W	W	W	D	D	W	D	W	L	L	D	W	L
ISPE	L	W	L	W	W	L	L	L	W	D	D	W	W	W	W	D	L	D	L	D	L	L
Mahar United	W	L	W	L	D	L	W	W	L	L	W	L	W	L	D	L	W	W	W	W	L	D
Myawady	L	L	W	D	L	L	L	L	L	L	L	L	L	L	L	D	L	L	W	L	L	D
Rakhine United	L	L	L	D	L	L	L	L	L	D	L	L	L	D	W	L	L	D	W	L	W	D
Shan United	W	W	W	W	D	W	W	W	W	W	W	W	W	W	W	W	W	D	W	W	W	W
Thitsar Arman	L	L	L	L	L	W	L	D	W	L	L	W	D	L	L	W	L	W	L	W	W	D
Yadanarbon	D	W	W	L	W	L	W	D	W	L	D	L	D	L	L	W	W	L	D	W	D	D
Yangon United	W	W	D	W	D	W	W	W	W	D	W	W	D	W	D	L	W	W	D	W	W	W

Source: RSSSF
W = Win; D = Draw; L = Loss; P = Postponed

=== Positions by round ===
To preserve chronological evolvements, any postponed matches are not included to the round at which they were originally scheduled, but added to the full round they were played immediately afterwards. For example, if a match is scheduled for round 7, but then played between rounds 8 and 9, it will be added to the standings for round 8.

Team ╲ Round	1	2	3	4	5	6	7	8	9	10	11	12	13	14	15	16	17	18	19	20	21	22
Shan United	5	3	1	1	1	1	1	1	1	1	1	1	1	1	1	1	1	1	1	1	1	1
Hantharwady United	3	2	3	3	2	2	3	3	3	2	2	2	2	3	2	2	2					
Yangon United	2	1	2	2	3	3	2	2	2	3	3	3	3	2	3	3	3					
Dagon Star United	1	6	6	4	6	4	4	4	4	4	4	4	4	4	4	4	4	4				
I.S.P.E	9	5	7	6	5	6	8	8	8	7	7	7	5	5	5	5	5	5				
Yadanarbon	7	4	4	5	4	5	5	5	5	5	5	5	7	7	7	6	6					
Mahar United	4	8	5	7	7	7	6	6	6	6	6	6	6	6	6	7	7					
Dagon Port	8	7	8	9	9	8	7	7	7	8	8	8	8	8	8	8	8					
Thitsar Arman	11	10	11	12	12	11	11	9	9	9	9	9	9	10	10	9	9					
Ayeyawady United	6	9	10	10	8	9	9	10	10	10	10	10	10	9	9	10	10					
Rakhine United	12	11	12	11	11	12	12	12	12	12	12	12	12	12	11	11	11	11	11	11	11	11
Myawady	10	12	9	8	10	10	10	11	11	11	11	11	11	11	12	12	12	12	12	12	12	12

Qualification to the 2025–26 AFC Challenge League Group Stage
Relegation to the 2025 MNL-2

Source: 2024 MNL

=== Matches ===
Fixtures and results of the Myanmar National League 2024 season.

Week 1

6/7/2024	**Yangon United**	**2–0**	**Rakhine United**	YUSC, Yangon
15:45 UTC+06:30	David Htan 34'; Zaw Win Thein 82'

6/7/2024	**Dagon Star United**	**3–1**	**Thitsar Arman**	Thuwunna Stadium, Yangon
16:00 UTC+06:30	Aung Thiha 61'; Aung Kyaw Naing 71'; Zin Min Tun 83'		Saw Myo Zaw 37'

7/7/2024	**Ayeyawady United**	**1–1**	**Yadanarbon**	Pathein Stadium, Pathein
16:00 UTC+06:30	Aung Pyae Phyo 45'		Pyae Moe 85'

7/7/2024	**Shan United**	**1–0**	**Myawady**	Taunggyi Stadium, Taunggyi
15:45 UTC+06:30	Mark Sekyi 69'

7/7/2024	**Hanthawady United**	**4–3**	**Dagon Port**	Thuwunna Stadium, Yangon
16:00 UTC+06:30	Win Moe Kyaw 24'; Soe Kyaw Kyaw 54', 67'; Yan Naing Aung 88'		Mogou 9', 79'; Myo Satt Paing 46'

8/7/2024	**ISPE**	**0–1**	**Mahar United**	YUSC, Yangon
16:00 UTC+06:30			Patrick 76'

Week 2

11/7/2024	**Shan United**	**2–1**	**Dagon Star United**	Taunggyi Stadium, Taunggyi
15:45 UTC+06:30	Htet Phyo Wai 19'; Aung Wunna Soe 47'		Zin Min Tun 76'

12/7/2024	**Yadanarbon**	**3–2**	**Mahar United**	YUSC, Yangon
16:00 UTC+06:30	Soe Min Oo 45+2'; Ti Nyain Min 52'; Moe Swe 79'		Kyaw Swar Min 35'; Patrick Edubat 56'

13/7/2024	**Yangon United**	**5–0**	**Myawady**	YUSC, Yangon
16:00 UTC+06:30	La Min Htwe 12', 45+2'; Yan Naing Oo 16'; Hlaing Bo Bo 52'; Oakkar Naing 84'

13/7/2024	**ISPE**	**5–1**	**Rakhine United**	Thuwunna Stadium, Yangon
15:45 UTC+06:30	Naing Naing Kyaw 12', 29'; Thein Zaw Thiha 30', 48', 62'		Addae Joseph 76'

14/7/2024	**Hanthawady United**	**1–0**	**Thitsar Arman**	Thuwunna Stadium, Yangon
16:00 UTC+06:30	Kyaw Myo Naing 59'

14/7/2024	**Ayeyawady United**	**1–2**	**Dagon Port**	Pathein Stadium, Pathein
16:00 UTC+06:30	Yar Zar Aung 3'		Myo Sett Paing 10'; Mogou 60' (pen.)

Week 3

19/7/2024	**Dagon Star United**	**2–1**	**ISPE**	Thuwunna Stadium, Yangon
16:00 UTC+06:30	Suan Lam Mang 28'; Aung Kyaw Naing 63'		Khaing Ye Win 20'

20/7/2024	**Thitsar Arman**	**1–2**	**Yadanarbon**	YUSC, Yangon
15:30 UTC+06:30	Hla Tun 19'		Soe Min Oo 28'; Kalep 31'

20/7/2024	**Rakhine United**	**1–4**	**Mahar United**	Thuwunna Stadium, Yangon
16:00 UTC+06:30	Mang Deih Pay 13'		Patrick 20', 70'; Aung Hlaing Win 28', 41'

21/7/2024	**Yangon United**	**1–1**	**Hantharwady United**	YUSC, Yangon
15:30 UTC+06:30	La Min Htwe 60' (pen.)		Kyaw Myo Naing 73'

21/7/2024	**Ayeyawady United**	**0–1**	**Myawady**	Kyaut Tie Stadium, Pathein
15:30 UTC+06:30			Kaung Si Thu 43'

21/7/2024	**Dagon Port**	**2–4**	**Shan United**	Thuwunna Stadium, Yangon
16:00 UTC+06:30	Myo Satt Paing 1'; Kaung Myat Kyaw 82'		Hein Phyo Win 40'; Khun Kyaw Zin Hein 49', 87'; Mark Serki 62'

Week 4

26/7/2024	**Dagon Star United**	**4–2**	**Dagon Port**	YUSC, Yangon
15:30 UTC+06:30	Nyein Chan 45+1'; Swan Htet 65', 83' (pen.); Suan Lam Mang 90+4'		Mogou Constantin 51', 73' (pen.)

26/7/2024	**Hantharwady United**	**1–0**	**Yadanarbon**	Thuwunna Stadium, Yangon
16:00 UTC+06:30	Win Moe Kyaw 84'

27/7/2024	**Yangon United**	**1–0**	**Mahar United**	YUSC, Yangon
15:30 UTC+06:30	Yan Kyaw Htwe 58' (pen.)

27/7/2024	**ISPE**	**1–0**	**Ayeyawady United**	Thuwunna Stadium, Yangon
16:00 UTC+06:30	Hein Htet Nyein 25'

28/7/2024	**Thitsar Arman**	**1–4**	**Shan United**	Thuwunna Stadium, Yangon
16:00 UTC+06:30	Min Maw Oo 89'		Sa Aung Pyae Ko 9'; Thet Wai Moe 35', 73'; Zwe Khant Min 62'

29/7/2024	**Myawady**	**0–0**	**Rakhine United**	Thuwunna Stadium, Yangon
16:00 UTC+06:30

Week 5

2/8/2024	**ISPE**	**2–0**	**Myawady**	YUSC, Yangon
15:30 UTC+06:30	Win Pyae Maung 18'; Naing Naing Kyaw 81'			Referee: U Moe Kaung

2/8/2024	**Hantharwady United**	**1–0**	**Dagon Star United**	Thuwunna Stadium, Yangon
16:00 UTC+06:30	Than Toe Aung 21'			Referee: U Zaw Zaw Aung

3/8/2024	**Yadanarbon**	**3–2**	**Rakhine United**	Thuwunna Stadium, Yangon
16:00 UTC+06:30	Soe Min Oo 43', 60'; Aung Kyaw Thu 90+3'		Joseph 78', 81'	Referee: U Thant Zin Oo

4/8/2024	**Shan United**	**2–2**	**Yangon United**	Taunggyi Stadium, Taunggyi
15:30 UTC+06:30	Mark Sekyi 47', 71'		Kaung Sithu 14'; Kyaw Phyo Wai 26'	Referee: U Thura Zaw

4/8/2024	**Mahar United**	**3–3**	**Dagon Port**	Thuwunna Stadium, Yangon
16:00 UTC+06:30	Win Ko Htay 61'; Thet Naing 71'; Patrick 79'		Mogou Constantin 25', 45+1' (pen.); Aye Min Thu 73'	Referee: U Zaw Zaw

5/8/2024	**Thitsar Arman**	**0–1**	**Ayeyawady United**	YUSC, Yangon
15:30 UTC+06:30			Aung Pyae Phyo 18' (pen.)	Referee: U Nyein Chan Aung

Week 6

9/8/2024	**Dagon Port**	**2–1**	**Myawady**	Thuwunna Stadium, Yangon
16:00 UTC+06:30	Mogou Constantin 79'; Myo Satt Paing 90+4'		Yell Moe Yan 52'	Referee: U Kyaw Zayar Aung

10/8/2024	**Ayeyawady United**	**0–1**	**Hantharwady United**	Kyaut Tie Stadium, Pathein
15:30 UTC+06:30			Aung Myat Thu 90+1' (pen.)	Referee: U Tin Naing Htwe

10/8/2024	**Shan United**	**3–0**	**ISPE**	Taunggyi Stadium, Taunggyi
15:30 UTC+06:30	Efrain Rintaro 26'; Myo Ko Tun 56'; Mark Serki 69'			Referee: U Aung Myint Kyaw

10/8/2024	**Rakhine United**	**0–6**	**Thitsar Arman**	Thuwunna Stadium, Yangon
16:00 UTC+06:30			Sithu Win 4'; Lin Htet Oo 19', 24', 31'; Saw Myo Zaw 58'; Naing Win Tun 67'	Referee: U Thein Saw

11/8/2024	**Yadanarbon**	**2–5**	**Yangon United**	Thuwunna Stadium, Yangon
16:00 UTC+06:30	Ti Nyain Min 13'; Arkar 55'		Yan Kyaw Htwe 25'; Hlaing Bo Bo 58'; Kaung Sithu 76'; Zaw Win Thein 86'; Aung Myo Khant 90+4'	Referee: U Khin Maung Soe

12/8/2024	**Mahar United**	**0–3**	**Dagon Star United**	YUSC, Yangon
15:30 UTC+06:30			Suan Lam Mang 11'; Zaw Ye Tun 80'; Nyein Chan Aung 90+3'	Referee: U Kyaw Zall Lwin

Week 7

16/8/2024	**Hantharwady United**	**0–2**	**Shan United**	YUSC, Yangon
15:30 UTC+06:30			Khun Kyaw Zin Hein 22'; Bakayoko 70'	Referee: U Khin Maung Soe

16/8/2024	**Dagon Port**	**4–3**	**Rakhine United**	Thuwunna Stadium, Yangon
16:00 UTC+06:30	Kaung Myat Kyaw 38', 41', 61'; Tun Tun Thein 70'		Tun Tun Aung 25'; Than Kyaw Htay 78'; Addae 90+1'	Referee: U Thu Rein Nyan Win

17/8/2024	**ISPE**	**1–3**	**Yangon United**	Thuwunna Stadium, Yangon
16:00 UTC+06:30	Khaing Ye Win 25'		Yan Kyaw Htwe 28' (pen.), 52'; David Htan 65'	Referee: U Thant Zin Oo

18/8/2024	**Ayeyawady United**	**0–1**	**Dagon Star United**	Pathein Stadium, Pathein
15:30 UTC+06:30			Zin Min Tun 74'	Referee: U Thura Zaw

18/8/2024	**Yadanarbon**	**3–0**	**Myawady**	Thuwunna Stadium, Yangon
16:00 UTC+06:30	Ti Nyain Min 16', 42'; Pyae Moe 90'			Referee: U Zaw Zaw

19/8/2024	**Mahar United**	**4–1**	**Thitsar Arman**	YUSC, Yangon
15:30 UTC+06:30	Aung Hlaing Win 12'; Patrick Edubat 21'; Kyaw Swar Min 50'; Win Ko Htay 71'		Min Maw Oo 86'	Referee: U Kyaw Zayar Aung

Week 8

23/8/2024	**Thitsar Arman**	**3–3**	**Dagon Port**	YUSC, Yangon
15:30 UTC+06:30	Min Maw Oo 61'; Naing Win Tun 69'; Myat Phone Khant 90+3'		Kaung Myat Kyaw 2'; Myo Satt Paing 42'; Eant Maw Oo 45+3'	Referee: U Kyaw Zall Lwin

23/8/2024	**Myawady**	**0–1**	**Mahar United**	Thuwunna Stadium, Yangon
16:00 UTC+06:30			Patrick 45+1'	Referee: U Zaw Zaw Aung

24/8/2024	**Dagon Star United**	**1-1**	**Yadanarbon**	Thuwunna Stadium, Yangon
16:00 UTC+06:30	Suan Lam Mang 54'		Ti Nyein Min 47'

25/8/2024	**Hanthawady United**	**3-1**	**I.S.P.E**	Thuwunna Stadium, Yangon
16:00 UTC+06:30	Yan Naing Aung 29'; Than Toe Aung 48'; Aung Myat Thu 63'		Saw Sae Ka Paw Say 23'

25/8/2024	**Yangon United**	**4-1**	**Ayeyawady United**	Y.U.S.C, Yangon
16:00 UTC+06:30	Yan Kyaw Htwe 20', 45+2'; Yan Naing Oo 66'; Thar Yar Win Htet 90+4'		Thiha 15'

26/8/2024	**Rakhine United**	**1-4**	**Shan United**	Y.U.S.C, Yangon
16:00 UTC+06:30	Thet Tun Aung 22'		William 9', 46'; Aung Naing Win 48'; Sa Aung Pyae Ko 66'

Week 9

7/9/2024	**Mahar United**	**2-3**	**Hantharwady United**	Thuwunna Stadium(Yangon)
16:00 UTC+06:30	Patrick 62'; Win Ko Htay 90+4'		Win Moe Kyaw 34'; Aung Myat Thu 40'; Kyaw Myo Naing 90+2'

8/9/2024	**Ayeyawady United**	**1-2**	**Shan United**	Pathein Stadium, Pathein
16:00 UTC+06:30	Yan Naing Lin 62'		Bakayoko 2'; Rintaro 85'

8/9/2024	**Dagon Port**	**1-6**	**Yangon United**	Thuwunna Stadium, Yangon
16:00 UTC+06:30	Sithu Naing 55'		Okkar Naing 3', 34', 67'; Yan Kyaw Htwe 45+1'; David Htan 51'; Lamin Htwe 62'

9/9/2024	**Rakhine United**	**1-5**	**Dagon Star United**	Thuwunna Stadium, Yangon
16:00 UTC+06:30	Joseph 43'		Suan Lam Mang 17', 29'; Aung Kyaw Naing 42'; Zin Min Tun 76'; Nyein Chan Aung 90+5'

9/9/2024	**Thitsar Arman**	**3-2**	**Myawady**	YUSC Stadium, Yangon
16:00 UTC+06:30	Aung Pyae Sone 2'; Aung Kyaw hein 26'; Sithu Win 61'		Htet Lin Aung 25'; Than Aung Kyaw 65'

26/9/2024	**Yadanarbon**	**1-1**	**ISPE**
16:00 UTC+06:30	Thu Ya Kyaw 45+3'		Than Toe Aung 23'

Week 10

13/9/2024	**Dagon Port**	**1-2**	**Yadanarbon**	YUSC Stadium, Yangon
16:00 UTC+06:30	Aung Thu Ya 39'		Moe Swe 7'; Pyae Moe 89'

13/9/2024	**Mahar United**	**1-5**	**Shan United**	Thuwunna, Yangon
16:00 UTC+06:30	Thet Naing 47'		Rintaro 8', 11'; Thurein Tun 71'; Nanda Kyaw 75'; Kyaw Ko Ko 85'

14/9/2024	**Thitsar Arman**	**1-4**	**ISPE**	Thuwunna Stadium, Yangon
16:00 UTC+06:30	Myat Phone Khant 66'		Than Toe Aung 51', 83'; Kyaw Zaya 71'; Thein Zaw Thiha 81'

14/9/2024	**Yangon United**	**0-0**	**Dagon Star United**	YSUC Stadium, Yangon
16:00 UTC+06:30

15/9/2024	**Rakhine United**	**1-1**	**Ayeyawady United**	Thuwunna Stadium, Yangon
16:00 UTC+06:30	Htoo Wuuna 88'		Chan Nyein 22'

15/9/2024	**Myawady**	**0-1**	**Hanthawady United**	YSUC Stadium, Yangon
15:30 UTC+06:30			Bo Bo Aung 64'

Week 11

20/9/2024	**Mahar United**	**2-0**	**Ayeyawady United**	YUSC Stadium, Yangon
16:00 UTC+06:30	Thet Naing 6'; Toe Sat Naing 60'

20/9/2024	**Yadanarbon**	**1-5**	**Shan United**	Thuwunna, Yangon
16:00 UTC+06:30	Soe Min Oo 30'		Bakayoko 14'; Ye Yint Aung 33', 46', 88'; Kyaw Ko Ko 57'

21/9/2024	**Myawady**	**0-2**	**Dagon Star United**	Thuwunna Stadium, Yangon
16:00 UTC+06:30			Suan Lam Mang 56'; Aung Thiha 66'

22/9/2024	**Dagon Port**	**0-0**	**ISPE**	Thuwunna Stadium, Yangon
16:00 UTC+06:30

23/9/2024	**Thitsar Arman**	**1-2**	**Yangon United**	Thuwunna Stadium, Yangon
16:00 UTC+06:30	Saw Myo Zaw 15'		Yan Kyaw Htwe 54'; Yan Naing Oo 64'

23/9/2024	**Rakhine United**	**0-4**	**Hanthawady United**	Taunggyi Stadium, Taunggyi
15:30 UTC+06:30			Aung Myat Thu 70', 76', 76', 90+3'; Lar Din Maw Yar 78'

Week 12

19/10/2024	**Hanthawady United**	**3–2**	**Mahar United**	Thuwunna Stadium, Yangon
16:00 UTC+06:30	Soe Kyaw Kyaw 20', 48' (pen.); Than Toe Aung 35'		Kaung Myat Thu 40', 48'

19/10/2024	**Yangon United**	**5-1**	**Dagon Port**	YUSC, Yangon
16:00 UTC+06:30	Yan Kyaw Htwe 9'; David Htan 41'; Yan Naing Oo 61'; Kaung Sithu 76'; Aee Soe 84'		Mogou 19'

19/11/2024	**Shan United**	**2-0**	**Ayeyawady United**	Taunggyi Stadium, Taunggyi
16:00 UTC+06:30	Mark Sekyi 33'; Ya Yint AUng 83'

20/10/2024	**Myawady**	**3-4**	**Thitsar Arman**	Thuwunna Stadium, Yangon
16:00 UTC+06:30	Kaung Sithu 21'; Saw Aung Myo Tun 33', 90+2'		Lin Htet Oo 5', 38'; Min Maw Oo 10', 65'

21/10/2024	**Dagon Star United**	**1-0**	**Rakhine United**	Thuwunna Stadium, Yangon
16:00 UTC+06:30	Swan Htet 45'

21/10/2024	**ISPE**	**0-0**	**Yadanarbon**	Thuwunna Stadium, Yangon
15:30 UTC+06:30

Week 13

3/11/2024	**Hanthawady United**	**2-2**	**Yangon United**	Thuwunna Stadium, Yangon
16:00 UTC+06:30	Than Toe Aung 11'; Aung Myat Thu 33'		Okkar Naing 55'; Wai Lin Aung 61'

4/11/2024	**Myawady**	**1-3**	**Ayeyawady United**	YUSC, Yangon
16:00 UTC+06:30	Saw Aung Myo Tun 67'		Yar Zar Aung 20'; Yan Paing Soe 52'; Aung Pyae Phyo 77'

4/11/2024	**ISPE**	**2-1**	**Dagon Star United**	Thuwunna Stadium, Yangon
16:00 UTC+06:30	Saw Sae Ka Paw Say 14'; Than Toe Aung 45+2'		Suan Lam Mang 90+5'

5/11/2024	**Mahar United**	**5-1**	**Rakhine United**	Thuwunna Stadium, Yangon
16:00 UTC+06:30	Nay Lin Soe 29'; Patrick 31', 43'; Kyaw Swar Min 45', 54'		Aung Kyaw Aye 66'

6/11/2024	**Yadanarbon**	**0-0**	**Thitsar Arman**	Thuwunna Stadium, Yangon
16:00 UTC+06:30

7/11/2024	**Shan United**	**3-0**	**Dagon Port**	Taunggyi Stadium, Taunggyi
15:30 UTC+06:30	Thet Wai Moe 45+2'; Myat Kaung Khant 76'; Ye Yint Aung 85'

Week 14

22/11/2024	**Hanthawady United**	**2-2**	**Rakhine United**	Thuwunna Stadium, Yangon
16:00 UTC+06:30	Win Moe Kyaw 28'; Lat Wai Phone 54'		Moukailou 34'; Than Kyaw Htay 83'

23/11/2024	**ISPE**	**7-1**	**Dagon Port**	Thuwunna, Yangon
16:00 UTC+06:30	Thein Zaw Thiha 15', 37', 42', 65' (pen.); Than Toe Aung 51'; Soe Lin Aung 84'		Mogou 24'

23/11/2024	**Ayeyawady United**	**3-1**	**Mahar United**	Pathein Stadium, Pathein
16:00 UTC+06:30	Yar Zar Aung 50', 52' (pen.); Aung Pyae Phyo 84'		Thet Naing 39'

24/11/2024	**Yangon United**	**3-2**	**Thitsar Arman**	YUSC Stadium, Yangon
16:00 UTC+06:30	Okkar Naing 45+5'; Saw Htoo Pwe Moo 48'; Wai Lin AUng 81'		Naing Win Tun 7'; Saw Myo Zaw 61'

24/11/2024	**Dagon Star United**	**2-0**	**Myawady**	Thuwunna Stadium, Yangon
16:00 UTC+06:30	Suam Lam Mang 21' (pen.); Aung Kyaw Naing 49'

24/11/2024	**Shan United**	**2-0**	**Yadanarbon**	Taunggyi Stadium, Taunggyi
15:30 UTC+06:30	Ye Yint Aung 45+1'; Myat Kaung Khant 83'

Week 15

10/1/2025	**Dagon Port**	**0–3**	**Dagon Star United**	Thuwunna Stadium, Yangon
16:00 UTC+06:30			Swan Htet 29'; Aung Kyaw Naing 82', 90+4'

10/1/2025	**Rakhine United**	**2-1**	**Myawady**	YUSC Stadium, Yangon
16:00 UTC+06:30	Than Kyaw Htay 32'; Saw Lin Htet Paing 79'		Naing Zin Htet 50'

11/1/2025	**Mahar United**	**2-2**	**Yangon United**	Thuwunna Stadium, Yangon
16:00 UTC+06:30	Thet Naing 83', 90+1'		Wai Lin Aung 57'; Kaung Sithu 69'

12/1/2025	**Shan United**	**3-1**	**Thitsar Arman**	Taunggyi Stadium, Taunggyi
16:00 UTC+06:30	Kyaw Ko Ko 45+2'; Bakayoko 52'; Rintaro 70'		Pyae Sone Aung 85'

12/1/2025	**Yadanarbon**	**1-2**	**Hanthawady United**	Thuwunna Stadium, Yangon
16:00 UTC+06:30	Pyae Moe 58'		Aung Myat Thu 77'; Win Moe Kyaw 90+1'

13/1/2025	**Ayeyawady United**	**0-2**	**ISPE**	Thuwunna Stadium, Yangon
15:30 UTC+06:30			Win Pyae Maung 29'; Hein Htet Nyein 85'

Week 16

17/1/2025	**Dagon Port**	**3-2**	**Mahar United**	Thuwunna Stadium, Yangon
16:00 UTC+06:30	Toe Sat Naing 53' (o.g.); Mogou 74'; La Yaung 84'		Arkar Kyaw 34'; Thet Naing 77'

18/1/2025	**Rakhine United**	**2-4**	**Yadanarbon**	Thuwunna Stadium, Yangon
16:00 UTC+06:30	Moukailou 15'; Than Kyaw Htay 25'		Soe Min Oo 5'; Pyae Moe 56'; Kyi Soe 72', 83'

18/1/2025	**Yangon United**	**0-1**	**Shan United**	YUSC Stadium, Yangon
15:30 UTC+06:30			Myat Kaung Khant 7'

19/1/2025	**ISPE**	**0-0**	**Myawady**	Thuwuna Stadium, Yangon
16:00 UTC+06:30

20/1/2025	**Ayeyawawady United**	**0-1**	**Thitsar Arman**	YUSC Stadium, Yangon
15:30 UTC+06:30			Naing Win Tun 59'

21/1/2025	**Dagon Star United**	**1-1**	**Hanthawady United**	YUSC Stadium, Yangon
15:30 UTC+06:30	Aung Thiha 33'		Aung Myat Thu 63'

Week 17

24/1/2025	**Yadanarbon**	**3-1**	**Ayeyawady United**	Thuwunna Stadium, Yangon
16:00 UTC+06:30	Sa Khant Chaw 4'; Pyae Moe 41'; Kyi Soe 90+2'		Nyi Nyi Aung 90+3'

24/1/2025	**Mahar United**	**2-1**	**ISPE**	YUSC Stadium, Yangon
16:00 UTC+06:30	Soe Lin Aung 4' (o.g.); Kyaw Swar Min 78'		Than Toe UAng 61'

25/1/2025	**Rakhine United**	**0-5**	**Yangon United**	Thuwunna Stadium, Yangon
15:30 UTC+06:30			Yan Kyaw Htwe 27' (pen.), 38', 67'; Okkar Naing 73'; Aung Myo Khant 79'

26/1/2025	**Myawady**	**1-5**	**Shan United**	Thuwuna Stadium, Yangon
16:00 UTC+06:30	Naing Zin Htet 35'		Htet Phyo Wai 45'; Rintaro 61', 67'; Ye Yint Aung 76'; Kyaw Ko Ko 90+2'

27/1/2025	**Thitsar Arman**	**1-2**	**Dagon Star United**	Thuwunna Stadium, Yangon
15:30 UTC+06:30	Saw Myo Zaw 80'		Swan Htet 55'; Suan Lam Mang 82'

28/1/2025	**Dagon Port**	**1-2**	**Hanthawady United**	Thuwunna Stadium, Yangon
15:30 UTC+06:30	Myo Set Paing 88'		Wine Lu 20'; Maung Maung Soe 36'

Week 18

30/1/2025	**Rakhine United**	**0-0**	**ISPE**	Thuwunna Stadium, Yangon
16:00 UTC+06:30

31/1/2025	**Myawady**	**1-4**	**Yangon United**	Thuwunna Stadium, Yangon
16:00 UTC+06:30	Naing Zin Htet 88'		Aee Soe 7'; Yan Kyaw Htwe 32'; Thar Yar Win Htet 57'; Kaung Sithu 84'

1/2/2025	**Dagon Star United**	**0-0**	**Shan United**	Thuwunna Stadium, Yangon
15:30 UTC+06:30

2/2/2025	**Dagon Port**	**2-4**	**Ayeyawady United**	Thuwuna Stadium, Yangon
16:00 UTC+06:30	Kaung Myat Kyaw 30'; Guy Michel 48'		Nyi Nyi Aung 32', 42'; Chan Nyein 65'; Aung Pyae Phyo 90'

3/2/2025	**Mahar United**	**2-0**	**Yadanarbon**	Thuwunna Stadium, Yangon
15:30 UTC+06:30	Edubat Patrick 16', 58'

3/2/2025	**Thitsar Arman**	**1-0**	**Hanthawady United**	YSUC Stadium, Yangon
15:30 UTC+06:30	Saw Myo Zaw 62' (pen.)

Week 19

7/2/2025	**Myawady**	**4-1**	**Dagon Port**	Thuwunna Stadium, Yangon
16:00 UTC+06:30	Naing ZIn Htet 28', 90+1'; Soe Thet Maung 76'; Yan Naing Oo 90+5'		Myo Sett Paing 38'

8/2/2025	**Yangon United**	**1-4**	**Yadanarbon**	YSUC Stadium, Yangon
15:30 UTC+06:30	Nyan Lin Htet 45+2'		Arkar 64'

8/2/2025	**Hanthawady United**	**0-2**	**Ayeyawdy United**	Thuwunna Stadium, Yangon
15:30 UTC+06:30			Nyi Nyi Aung 10'; Yar Zar Aung 51'

9/2/2025	**Thitsar Arman**	**1-3**	**Rakhine United**	Thuwuna Stadium, Yangon
16:00 UTC+06:30	Augn Tun Tun 46'		Mvando 64', 82', 88'

10/2/2025	**Dagon Star United**	**0-1**	**Mahar United**	Thuwunna Stadium, Yangon
16:00 UTC+06:30			Arkar Kyaw 68' (pen.)

11/2/2025	**ISPE**	**0-5**	**Shan United**	Thuwuna Stadium, Yangon
15:30 UTC+06:30			Bakayoko 9', 43', 55'; Ye Yint Aung 17'; Hein Phyo Win 25'

Week 20

14/2/2025	**Dagon Port**	**1-2**	**Thitsar Arman**	Thuwunna Stadium, Yangon
16:00 UTC+06:30	Michel 34'		Aung Tun Tun 16'; Min Maw Oo 45+1'

15/2/2025	**Mahar United**	**4-1**	**Myawady**	YSUC Stadium, Yangon
15:30 UTC+06:30	Kaung Myat Thu 38'; Kyaw Swar Min 47'; Patrick 52'; Nay Lin Soe 57'		Thiha Aung 37'

16/2/2025	**ISPE**	**0-0**	**Hanthawady United**	Thuwunna Stadium, Yangon
15:30 UTC+06:30

17/2/2025	**Shan United**	**3-0**	**Rakhine United**	Thuwuna Stadium, Yangon
16:00 UTC+06:30

17/2/2025	**Ayeyawady United**	**0-4**	**Yangon United**	Thuwunna Stadium, Yangon
16:00 UTC+06:30			Okkar Niang 5'; Zaw Win Thein 48'; Yan Kyaw Htwe 60'; Aee Soe 70'

18/2/2025	**Yadanarbon**	**4-2**	**Dagon Star United**	Thuwuna Stadium, Yangon
15:30 UTC+06:30

Week 21

20/2/2025	**ISPE**	**0-5**	**Thitsar Arman**	Thuwunna Stadium, Yangon
16:00 UTC+06:30			Saw Myo Zaw 1'; Lin Htet Oo 21'; Shine Wunna Aung 33', 73'; Min Maw Oo 53'

21/2/2025	**Hanthawady United**	**2-1**	**Myawady**	YSUC Stadium, Yangon
15:30 UTC+06:30	Aung Myat Thu 87', 90'		Naing Zin Htet 58'

22/2/2025	**Shan United**	**3-0**	**Mahar United**	Thuwunna Stadium, Yangon
15:30 UTC+06:30

22/2/2025	**Yadanarbon**	**3-3**	**Dagon Port**
16:00 UTC+06:30	Nay Oo Lwin 36'; Soe Min Oo 66'; Pyae Moe 79'		Mogou 33', 45+2'; Myo Satt Paing 60'

23/2/2025	**Dagon Star United**	**0-3**	**Yangon United**	Thuwuna Stadium, Yangon
15:30 UTC+06:30			David Htan 26'; Yan Kyaw Htwe 86'; Zaw Win Thein 90+3'

24/2/2025	**Ayeyawady United**	**1-2**	**Rakhine United**	Thuwuna Stadium, Yangon
16:00 UTC+06:30	Nan Hteik Zaw 50'		Thet Tun AUng 18', 90+2' (pen.)

Week 22

27/2/2025	**Myawady**	**2-2**	**Yadanarbon**	Thuwunna Stadium, Yangon
16:00 UTC+06:30	Htet Lin Aung 83', 90+4'		Pyae Moe 4', 45+1'

27/2/2025	**Yangon United**	**2-1**	**ISPE**	YSUC Stadium, Yangon
15:30 UTC+06:30	Yan Naing Oo 9', 43'		Saw Sae Ka Paw 56'

28/2/2025	**Dagon Star United**	**2-1**	**Ayeyawady United**	Thuwunna Stadium, Yangon
15:30 UTC+06:30	Swan Htet 18'; Suan Lam Mang 23'		Chan Nyein 45+1'

28/2/2025	**Thitsar Arman**	**3-3**	**Mahar United**	YSUC Stadium, Yangon
16:00 UTC+06:30	Min Maw Oo 84'; Pyae Sone Aung 87'; Saw Myo Zaw 89'		Edubat 11', 41'; Kyaw Swar Min 67'

1/3/2025	**Rakhine United**	**1-1**	**Dagon Port**	Thuwuna Stadium, Yangon
15:30 UTC+06:30	Thet Tun Aung 80'		Kaung Myat Kyaw 83'

1/3/2025	**Shan United**	**4-0**	**Hnathawady United**	Taunggyi Stadium, Taunggyi
16:00 UTC+06:30	Ye Yint Aung 8', 27'; Khun Kyaw Zin Hein 16'; Rintaro 37'

== Season statistics ==
=== Scoring ===
==== Top scorers ====
As of 7 FEB 2025

Rank	Player	Club	Goals
1	(Myanmar) Yan Kyaw Htwe	Yangon United	13
2	(Cameroon) Patrick Edubat	Mahar United	12
3	(Cameroon) Ghislain Mogou	Dagon Port	11
4	(Myanmar) Suan Lam Mang	Dagon Star United	10
5	(Myanmar) Thein Zaw Thiha	ISPE	9
5	(Myanmar) Aung Myat Thu	Hantharwady United	9
6	(Myanmar) Thet Naing	Mahar United	7
7	(Myanmar) Aung Kyaw Naing	Dagon Star United	6
7	(Myanmar) Oakkar Naing	Yangon United	6
7	(Myanmar) Ye Yint Aung	Shan United	6
7	(Ghana) Mark Sekyi	Shan United	6

==== Most assists ====
As of 6 July 2024

Rank	Player	Club	Assists
1			

==== Own goals ====
As of 18 Jan 2025

Rank	Player	Club	Own goals
1	Toe Sat Naing	Mahar United	

=== Hat-tricks ===
As of 16 September 2024

Player	For	Against	Result	Date
(Myanmar) Thein Zaw Thiha	ISPE	Rakhine United	**5**–1 (H)	13 July 2024
(Myanmar) Lin Htet Oo	Thitsar Arman	Rakhine United	**6**–0 (A)	10 August 2024
(Myanmar) Kaung Myat Kyaw	Dagon Port	Rakhine United	**4**–3 (H)	16 August 2024
(Myanmar) Oakkar Naing	Yangon United	Dagon Port	**6**–1 (A)	8 September 2024
(Myanmar) Yan Kyaw Htwe	Yangon United	Rakhine United	**5**–0 (A)	25 January 2025
(Ghana) Mvando	Rakine United	Thitsar Arman	**3**–1 (A)	9 February 2025
(Ivory Coast) Bakayoko	Shan United	ISPE	**5**–0 (A)	11 February 2025

Note

(H) – Home; (A) – Away

=== Clean sheets ===
As of 26 Feb 2025

Rank	Player	Club	Clean sheets
1	(Myanmar) Zin Nyi Nyi Aung	Dagon Star United	8
2	(Myanmar) Chit Min Htwe	ISPE	7
3	(Myanmar) Nay Lin Htet	Hantharwady United	6
4	(Myanmar) Kyaw Zin Phyo	Shan United	5
4	(Myanmar) Pyae Phyo Thu	Shan United	5
4	(Myanmar) Naing Lin Aung	Thitsar Arman	5
5	(Myanmar) Pyae Phyo Aung	Yangon United	4
6	(Myanmar) Wai Yan Min Aung	Yadanarbon	3
6	(Myanmar) Tun Nanda Oo	Myawady	3
6	(Myanmar) Aung Ko Latt	Mahar United	3
7	(Myanmar) Moun Htwei Aung	Mahar United	2
7	(Myanmar) Thura Kyaw	Yangon United	2
8	(Myanmar) Chan Nyein Kyaw	Rakhine United	1
8	(Myanmar) Khant Min Thant	Rakhine United	1
8	(Myanmar) A Zin Hmue	Ayeyawady United	1
8	(Myanmar) Hein Htet Soe	Ayeyawady United	1
8	(Myanmar) San Sat Naing	Yangon United	1

== Qualification for the 2025–26 AFC Clubs competitions ==
Team	League of qualification	Date of qualification	Qualified to
Shan United	[[2024 Myanmar National League Champion]]	28 February 2025	2025–26 AFC Challenge League Qualifying Round
Shan United	[[2024 Myanmar National League Cup Champion]]	19 June 2024	2025–26 ASEAN Club Championship qualifying play-offs Qualifying Round

== See also ==
- 2024 MNL League Cup
- MNL-2
- 2024 Myanmar Women's League
