= List of football clubs in Myanmar =

This is a list of football clubs in Myanmar.

== Myanmar National League clubs ==
- Ayeyawady United FC
- Chinland FC
- Dagon Port
- Dagon Star United
- Hantharwady United
- ISPE
- Rakhine United
- Mahar United
- Shan United
- ThitSar Arman
- Yadanabon FC
- Yangon United

=== Defunct and Unreported Clubs ===
- Chin United(Unreported)
- Magwe FC (Defunct)
- Manaw Myay FC (Defunct)
- Mawyawadi FC (Defunct)
- Mountain Lion FC (Defunct)
- Naypyidaw (Defunct)
- Southern Myanmar(Defunct)
- Zeyar Shwe May (Defunct)
- Zwekapin United (Defunct)

== Myanmar National League - 2 clubs ==
- Glory Goal
- Kachin United
- Myawady FC
- Silver Stars
- University FC
- Yarmanya United
- Yangon City
- Young Boy United

=== Defunct, Relegated, and Unreported Clubs ===
- Ayeyawady Rangers
  (Relegated in the 2024 MNL-2 season)
- Rakhapura United (Unreported )
  Youth Clubs of Rakhine United

== Myanmar Premier League clubs ==
=== 2007-2008 season ===
- Finance and Revenue
- Kanbawza
- Commerce
- Energy
- Transport
- YCDC
- Construction
- Defence
- A&I
- Home Affairs
- Forestry
- Railways
- Royal Eleven
- Army
