= 2016 MNL-2 qualifying rounds =

MNL-2 Qualifying rounds
- Season: 2016

This was the qualification round for MNL-2. This competition had four clubs. Only three qualified to the 2016 MNL-2 and one played for MNL-3.

== Qualifying round ==
Pos	Team	Pld	W	D	L	GF	GA	GD	Pts	Qualification or relegation
1	Mahar United FC (Q)	3	2	1	0	7	3	4	7	Promotion to 2016 MNL-2
2	United of Thanlyin FC (Q)	3	2	1	0	4	2	2	7	Promotion to 2016 MNL-2
3	City Star FC (Q)	3	1	0	2	2	5	-3	3	Promotion to 2016 MNL-2
4	Thihadeepa United	3	0	0	3	2	5	-3	0	Relegate to 2016 MNL-3

(Q) = qualified to play in MNL-2.

== Results ==
=== First Match ===
5 January 2016	Mahar United FC	2 - 1	Thihadeepa United FC	Salin Stadium
15:30	Thein Kyaw Htay 30'; Soe Nyi Nyi Lwin 52'		Aung San Lin 85'

5 January 2016	United of Thanlyin FC	1 - 0	City Stars FC	Padonmar Stadium, Myanmar
15:30	Ye Lin Naung 1'

=== Second Match ===
7 January 2016	United of Thanlyin FC	1 - 0	Thihadeepa United FC	Padonmar Stadium, Myanmar
15:30

7 January 2016	Mahar United FC	3 - 0	City Stars FC	Salin Stadium, Myanmar
15:30

=== Third Match ===
9 January 2016	City Stars FC	2 - 1	Thihadeepa United FC	Salin Stadium, Myanmar
08:30

9 January 2016	Mahar United FC	2 - 2	United of Thanlyin FC	Padonmar Stadium, Myanmar
08:30
