= 2016 MNL-2 =

MNL-2
- Season: 2016
- Champions: Manaw Myay
- Runner up: GFA
- Promoted: Manaw Myay; GFA
- Matches: 132
- Goals: 465 (3.52 per match)
- Top goalscorer: Donald Bissa (34 goals)
- Biggest home win: Nay Pyi Taw 6 - 0 University
- Biggest away win: University 0 - 7 Manaw Myay
- Highest scoring: Mawyawadi 7 - 3 Silver Stars

The MNL-2 2016 is the Myanmar National League's fourth full regular season. Four new clubs will join in 2016 MNL-2. There are Mahar United Football Club (MU FC), United of Thanlyin Football Club, Thihadeepa United Football Club (TU FC) and City Stars Football Club (CS FC). 2016 MNL-2 will start on 15 January. New clubs must play a qualifying round. Only three clubs will qualify to play in MNL-2.

== Standings ==
Pos	Team	Pld	W	D	L	GF	GA	GD	Pts	Promotion or relegation
1	Manaw Myay (C)	22	16	4	2	71	20	+51	52	Promotion to 2017 Myanmar National League
2	GFA	22	15	4	3	39	18	+21	49	Promotion to 2017 Myanmar National League
3	Nay Pyi Taw	22	15	3	4	62	29	+33	48	
4	Mahar United	22	14	6	2	48	17	+31	48	
5	Myawady FC	22	10	6	6	46	23	+23	36	
6	Mawyawadi FC	22	11	2	9	37	38	−1	35	
7	City Stars	22	7	4	11	30	39	−9	25	
8	University FC	22	6	5	11	33	50	−17	23	
9	Dagon FC	22	4	8	10	25	36	−11	20	
10	Pong Gan FC	22	3	3	16	25	62	−37	12	
11	United of Thanlyin	22	3	2	17	18	63	−45	11	Relegation to MNL-3
12	Silver Stars FC	22	3	1	18	26	75	−49	10	Relegation to MNL-3

(C) Champions

== Matches ==
Fixtures and Results of the 2016 MNL-2 season.

=== Week 1 ===
15 January 2016	Mawyawadi FC	3 - 4	All-University Selection FC	Padonmar Stadium, Yangon
16:00 UTC+06:30	Ye Wai Yan Soe 38', 73'; Kaung Sithu 82'		Arkar Win 42'; Thet Paing Soe 46', 84'; Kyaw Nyein Chan 79'

15 January 2016	Pong Gan FC	0 - 5	Mawyawadi FC	Salin Stadium, Yangon
16:00 UTC+06:30			Samuel 20', 22', 28'; Zin Ko Ko Tun 43'; Thet Naing Htwe 86'

16 January 2016	City Stars FC	3 - 2	Silver Stars FC	Padonmar Stadium, Yangon
16:00 UTC+06:30

16 January 2016	Nay Pyi Taw	3 - 1	Dagon FC	Salin Stadium, Yangon
15:30 UTC+06:30

17 January 2016	Mahar United	0 - 0	United of Thalyin FC	Padonmar Stadium, Yangon
16:00 UTC+06:30

18 January 2016	GFA	0 - 2	Manaw Myay	Thuwunna Stadium, Yangon
16:00 UTC+06:30

=== Week 2 ===
23 January 2016	United of Thanlyin	0 - 3	Myawady	Salin Stadium, Yangon
15:30 UTC+06:30			Ye Wai Yan Soe 6', 87'; Zaw Zin Htet 58'

23 January 2016	Manaw Myay	6 - 1	University	Padonmar Stadium, Yangon
15:30 UTC+06:30	Yan Kyaw Soe 25', 48'; Aung Myat Tun 30', 32'; Donald 77'; Naing Naing 81' (O.G)		Kaung Thet Naing 13'

24 January 2016	Silver Stars	1 - 4	Mahar United	Padonmar Stadium, Yangon
15:30 UTC+06:30	Maung Thet Lin 67'		Odinaga 10'; Aung Hlaing Win 25'; Toe Set Naing 55', 60'

24 January 2016	Dagon	0 - 0	G.F.A	Salin Stadium, Yangon
15:30 UTC+06:30

25 January 2016	Mawyawady	1 - 0	City Stars	Aung San Stadium, Yangon
15:30 UTC+06:30

25 January 2016	Pong Gan	0 - 4	Nay Pyi Taw	Thuwunna Stadium, Yangon
15:30 UTC+06:30

=== Week 3 ===
29 January 2016	City Stars	0 - 3	Nay Pyi Taw	Padonmar Stadium, Yangon
15:30 UTC+06:30			Kun Zayar Tun 49'; Kyaw Htay Oo 53'; Yan Kha 57'

29 January 2016	G.F.A	4 - 1	Pong Gan	Salin Stadium, Yangon
15:30 UTC+06:30	Mark 5'; Htet Naing Win 16'; Maung Maung Win 32'; Dambe 53'		Zaw Soe 85'

29 January 2016	University	1 - 1	Dagon	Thuwunna Stadium, Yangon
15:30 UTC+06:30	Thet Paing Soe 70'		Naing Naing 78' (pen.)

29 January 2016	Mahar United	0 - 1	Mawyawadi	Aung San Stadium, Yangon
15:30 UTC+06:30			Phyo Thaw Naing 81'

30 January 2016	United of Thanlyin	3 - 1	Silver Stars	Salin Stadium, Yangon
15:30 UTC+06:30

30 January 2016	Myawady	1 - 1	Manaw Myay	Padonmar Stadium, Yangon
15:30 UTC+06:30

=== Week 4 ===
5 February 2016	Silver Stars	0 - 5	Myawady	Thuwunna Stadium, Yangon
15:30 UTC+06:30			Ye Wai Yan Soe 22', 24', 37' (pen.); Thet Paing Htun 30'; Kaung Sithu 68'

5 February 2016	Mawyawadi	1 - 0	United of Thanlyin	Padonmar Stadium, Yangon
15:30 UTC+06:30	Samuel (24)

5 February 2016	Pong Gan	0 - 2	University	Salin Stadium, Yangon
15:30 UTC+06:30			Arkar Moe (72); Kyaw Nyein Chan (92)

6 February 2016	Dagon	0 - 1	Manaw Myay	Aung San Stadium, Yangon
15:30 UTC+06:30

6 February 2016	City Stars	0 - 1	G.F.A	Salin Stadium, Yangon
15:30 UTC+06:30

6 February 2016	Nay Pyi Taw	0 - 0	Mahar United	Padonmar Stadium, Yangon
15:30 UTC+06:30

=== Week 5 ===
12 February 2016	Silver Stars	1 - 2	Mawyawadi	Thuwunna Stadium, Yangon
15:30 UTC+06:30

12 February 2016	Manaw Myay	5 - 0	Pong Gan	Padonmar Stadium, Yangon
15:30 UTC+06:30

12 February 2016	University	2 - 2	City Stars	Salin Stadium, Yangon
15:30 UTC+06:30

12 February 2016	Myawady	1 - 1	Dagon	Aung San Stadium, Yangon
15:30 UTC+06:30

13 February 2016	United of Thanlyin	0 - 4	Nay Pyi Taw	Salin Stadium, Yangon
15:30 UTC+06:30

13 February 2016	Mahar United	0 - 0	G.F.A	Padonmar Stadium, Yangon
15:30 UTC+06:30

=== Week 6 ===
19 February 2016	Pong Gan	3 - 4	Dagon	Thuwunna Stadium, Yangon
15:30 UTC+06:30

19 February 2016	G.F.A	3 - 1	United of Thanlyin	Padonmar Stadium, Yangon
15:30 UTC+06:30

19 February 2016	Mahar United	1 - 0	University	Salin Stadium, Yangon
15:30 UTC+06:30

20 February 2016	Nay Pyi Taw	3 - 0	Silver Stars	Padonmar Stadium, Yangon
15:30 UTC+06:30

20 February 2016	City Stars	1 - 4	Manaw Myay	Aung San Stadium, Yangon
15:30 UTC+06:30

20 February 2016	Mawyawadi	0 - 2	Myawady	Salin Stadium, Yangon
15:30 UTC+06:30

=== Week 7 ===
24 February 2016	Myawady	4 - 1	Pong Gan	Aung San Stadium, Yangon
15:30 UTC+06:30

26 February 2016	Mawyawadi	2 - 1	Nay Pyi Taw	Padonmar Stadium, Yangon
15:30 UTC+06:30

26 February 2016	Dagon	1 - 2	City Stars	Salin Stadium, Yangon
15:30 UTC+06:30

26 February 2016	Silver Stars	1 - 3	G.F.A	Aung San Stadium, Yangon
15:30 UTC+06:30

27 February 2016	Manaw Myay	1 - 2	Mahar United	Padonmar Stadium, Yangon
15:30 UTC+06:30

27 February 2016	United of Thanlyin	0 - 2	University	Salin Stadium, Yangon
15:30 UTC+06:30

=== Week 8 ===
4 March 2016	Mahar United	2 - 2	Dagon	Padonmar Stadium
15:30 UTC+06:30

4 March 2016	City Stars	1 - 1	Pong Gan	Salin Stadium, Yangon
15:30 UTC+06:30

5 March 2016	Nay Pyi Taw	1 - 1	Myawady	Padonmar Stadium, Yangon
15:30 UTC+06:30

5 March 2016	G.F.A	1 - 0	Mawyawadi	Aung San Stadium, Yangon
15:30 UTC+06:30

5 March 2016	University	2 - 2	Silver Stars	Padonmar Stadium, Yangon
15:30 UTC+06:30

5 March 2016	United of Thanlyin	2 - 2	Manaw Myay	Salin Stadium, Yangon
15:30 UTC+06:30

=== Week 9 ===
9 March 2016	Mawyawadi	2 - 3	University	Aung San Stadium
15:30 UTC+06:30

11 March 2016	Myawady	3 - 0	City Stars	Thuwunna Stadium
15:30 UTC+06:30

11 March 2016	Nay Pyi Taw	1 - 3	G.F.A	Padonmar Stadium, Yangon
15:30 UTC+06:30

5 March 2016	Pong Gan	0 - 2	Mahar United	Sa Lin Stadium, Yangon
15:30 UTC+06:30

12 March 2016	Dagon	0 - 1	United of Thanlyin	Padonmar Stadium, Yangon
15:30 UTC+06:30

12 March 2016	Silver Stars	0 - 6	Manaw Myay	Salin Stadium, Yangon
15:30 UTC+06:30

=== Week 10 ===
18 March 2016	G.F.A	1 - 0	Myawady	Salin Stadium
15:30 UTC+06:30

18 March 2016	Mahar United	0 - 0	City Stars	Padonmar Stadium
15:30 UTC+06:30

18 March 2016	University	4 - 5	Nay Pyi Taw	Aung San Stadium, Yangon
15:30 UTC+06:30

19 March 2016	United of Thanlyin	3 - 0	Pon Gan	Padonmar Stadium, Yangon
15:30 UTC+06:30

19 March 2016	Manaw Myay	3 - 1	Mawyawadi	Aung San Stadium, Yangon
15:30 UTC+06:30

19 March 2016	Silver Stars	1 - 3	Dagon	Salin Stadium, Yangon
15:30 UTC+06:30

=== Week 11 ===
1 April 2016	Mawyawadi	1 - 1	Dagon	Padonmar Stadium
15:30 UTC+06:30

1 April 2016	G.F.A	2 - 0	University	Salin Stadium
15:30 UTC+06:30

1 April 2016	City Stars	3 - 0	United of Thanlyin	Aung San Stadium, Yangon
15:30 UTC+06:30

2 April 2016	Myawady	1 - 1	Mahar United	Padonmar Stadium, Yangon
15:30 UTC+06:30

2 April 2016	Pong Gan	1 - 3	Silver Star	Aung San Stadium, Yangon
15:30 UTC+06:30

2 April 2016	Nay Pyi Taw	2 - 3	Manaw Myay	Salin Stadium, Yangon
15:30 UTC+06:30

=== Week 12 ===
27 May 2016	City Stars	1 - 4	Mahar United	Padonmar Stadium
15:30 UTC+06:30

27 May 2016	Nay Pyi Taw	6 - 0	University	Salin Stadium
15:30 UTC+06:30

27 May 2016	Pong Gan	1 - 0	United of Thanlyin	Aung San Stadium, Yangon
15:30 UTC+06:30

28 May 2016	Myawady	1 - 2	GFA	Padonmar Stadium, Yangon
15:30 UTC+06:30

28 May 2016	Mawyawady	1 - 1	Manaw Myay	Aung San Stadium, Yangon
15:30 UTC+06:30

28 May 2016	Dagon	1 - 2	Silver Stars	Salin Stadium, Yangon
15:30 UTC+06:30

=== Week 13 ===
10 June 2016	Myawady	5 - 0	Thalyin	Padonmar Stadium
15:30 UTC+06:30

10 June 2016	University	0 - 7	Manaw Myay	Salin Stadium
15:30 UTC+06:30

10 June 2016	Mahar United	5 - 0	Silver Stars	Aung San Stadium, Yangon
15:30 UTC+06:30

11 June 2016	GFA	0 - 0	Dagon	Padonmar Stadium, Yangon
15:30 UTC+06:30

11 June 2016	City Stars	1 - 2	Mawyawadi	Aung San Stadium, Yangon
15:30 UTC+06:30

11 June 2016	Nay Pyi Taw	3 - 2	Pong Gan	Salin Stadium, Yangon
15:30 UTC+06:30

=== Week 14 ===
17 June 2016	Manaw Myay	3 - 1	Myawady	Padonmar Stadium
15:30 UTC+06:30

17 June 2016	Silver Stars	3 - 0	United of Thanlyin	Salin Stadium
15:30 UTC+06:30

17 June 2016	Dagon	1 - 0	University	Aung San Stadium, Yangon
15:30 UTC+06:30

17 June 2016	Mawyawadi	0 - 1	Mahar United	Padonmar Stadium, Yangon
15:30 UTC+06:30

18 June 2016	Pong Gan	1 - 2	GFA	Aung San Stadium, Yangon
15:30 UTC+06:30

18 June 2016	Nay Pyi Taw	2 - 1	City Stars	Salin Stadium, Yangon
15:30 UTC+06:30

=== Week 15 ===
24 June 2016	Manaw Myay	3 - 0	Dagon	Padonmar Stadium
15:30 UTC+06:30

24 June 2016	Mahar United	2 - 1	Nay Pyi Taw	Salin Stadium
15:30 UTC+06:30

24 June 2016	United of Thanlyin	1 - 2	Mawyawadi	Aung San Stadium, Yangon
15:30 UTC+06:30

24 June 2016	University	2 - 2	Pong Gan	Padonmar Stadium, Yangon
15:30 UTC+06:30

25 June 2016	GFA	2 - 0	City Star	Aung San Stadium, Yangon
15:30 UTC+06:30

25 June 2016	Myawady	6 - 1	Silver Stars	Salin Stadium, Yangon
15:30 UTC+06:30

=== Week 16 ===
1 July 2016	Dagon	v	Myawady
15:30 UTC+06:30

1 July 2016	Mawyawadi	7 - 2	Silver Stars
15:30 UTC+06:30

1 July 2016	Nay Pyi Taw	4 - 1	United of Thanlyin
15:30 UTC+06:30

24 June 2016	City Stars	1 - 1	University
15:30 UTC+06:30

2 July 2016	Pong Gan	1 - 4	Manaw Myay
15:30 UTC+06:30

2 July 2016	G.F.A	2 - 5	Mahar United
15:30 UTC+06:30

=== Week 17 ===
8 July 2016	Dagon	0 - 0	Pong Gan
15:30 UTC+06:30

8 July 2016	Silver Stasr	2 - 4	Nay Pyi Taw
15:30 UTC+06:30

9 July 2016	Manaw Myay	4 - 0	City Stars
15:30 UTC+06:30

9 July 2016	Myawady	2 - 1	Mawyawadi
15:30 UTC+06:30

10 July 2016	United of Thanlyin	1 - 6	G.F.A
15:30 UTC+06:30

10 July 2016	University	0 - 3	Mahar United
15:30 UTC+06:30

=== Week 18 ===
15 July 2016	Pong Gan	0 - 3	Myawady
15:30 UTC+06:30

15 July 2016	Nay Pyi Taw	5 - 1	Mawyawadi
15:30 UTC+06:30

16 July 2016	City Stars	4 - 0	Dagon
15:30 UTC+06:30

16 July 2016	G.F.A	0 - 2	City Stars
15:30 UTC+06:30

17 July 2016	Mahar United	2 - 3	Manaw Myay
15:30 UTC+06:30

17 July 2016	University	3 - 0	United of Thanlyin
15:30 UTC+06:30

=== Week 19 ===
22 July 2016	Pong Gan	0 - 3	City Stars
15:30 UTC+06:30

22 July 2016	Mawyawadi	2 - 3	G.F.A
15:30 UTC+06:30

22 July 2016	Dagon	1 - 4	Mahar United
15:30 UTC+06:30

22 July 2016	Manaw Myay	6 - 0	United of Thanlyin
15:30 UTC+06:30

23 July 2016	Silver Stars	1 - 4	University
15:30 UTC+06:30

23 July 2016	Myawady	1 - 1	Nay Pyi Taw
15:30 UTC+06:30

=== Week 20 ===
5 August 2016	City Stars	2 - 0	Myawady
15:30 UTC+06:30

5 August 2016	G.F.A	0 - 1	Nay Pyi Taw
15:30 UTC+06:30

6 August 2016	Mahar United	4 - 1	Pong Gan
15:30 UTC+06:30

6 August 2016	University	1 - 2	Mawyawadi
15:30 UTC+06:30

7 August 2016	United of Thanlyin	1 - 5	Dagon
15:30 UTC+06:30

7 August 2016	Manw Myay	2 - 0	Silver Stars
15:30 UTC+06:30

=== Week 21 ===
12 August 2016	Mahar United	2 - 1	Myawady
15:30 UTC+06:30

12 August 2016	University	0 - 1	G.F.A
15:30 UTC+06:30

12 August 2016	United of Thanlyin	1 - 5	City Stars
15:30 UTC+06:30

13 August 2016	Manaw Myay	3 - 4	Nay Pyi Taw
15:30 UTC+06:30

13 August 2016	Silver Stars	3 - 4	Pong Gan
15:30 UTC+06:30

13 August 2016	Dagon	1 - 2	Mawyawadi
15:30 UTC+06:30

=== Week 22 ===
26 August 2016	University	1 - 2	Myawady
15:30 UTC+06:30

26 August 2016	United of Thanlyin	1 - 4	Mahar United
15:30 UTC+06:30

26 August 2016	Manaw Myay	1 - 1	G.F.A
15:30 UTC+06:30

27 August 2016	Silver Stars	5 - 0	City stars
15:30 UTC+06:30

27 August 2016	Dagon	2 - 4	Nay Pyi Taw
15:30 UTC+06:30

27 July 2016	Mawyawadi	1 - 6	Pong Gan
15:30 UTC+06:30
