= 2015 MNL-2 =

MNL-2
- Season: 2015
- Champions: Southern Myanmar
- Runner up: Horizon FC
- Promoted: Southern Myanmar; Horizon FC
- Matches: 90
- Goals: 358 (3.98 per match)
- Longest unbeaten run: Southern Myanmar
- Longest losing run: Pong Gan FC

The MNL-2 2015 is the Myanmar National League's third full regular season. The first round of the season began on 11 January 2015.The MNL-2 2015 temporary stop about 3 months because of 2015 Singapore SEA Games.The MNL 2015 transfer window will open from May 19 to June 18.

== Standings ==
Pos	Team	Pld	W	D	L	GF	GA	GD	Pts	Promotion
1	Southern Myanmar (C, P)	18	14	4	0	37	6	+31	46	Promotion to 2016 Myanmar National League
2	Horizon FC (P)	18	11	5	2	54	16	+38	38	Promotion to 2016 Myanmar National League
3	GFA	18	11	3	4	38	13	+25	36	
4	Dagon FC	18	10	4	4	38	17	+21	34	
5	Myawady FC	18	9	3	6	58	28	+30	30	
6	Mawyawadi FC	18	9	3	6	38	18	+20	30	
7	All-University Selection FC	18	3	4	11	33	36	−3	13	
8	Best United FC	18	2	5	11	34	54	−20	11	
9	Silver Stars FC	18	1	6	11	15	74	−59	9	
10	Pong Gan FC	18	1	1	16	13	85	−72	4	

(C) Champions; (P) Promoted
