= United of Thanlyin F.C. =

Burmese football club

United of Thanlyin FC သန္လ်င္ယူႏိုက္တက္ ေဘာလုံးအသင္း
- Full name: United of Thanlyin Football Club
- Founded: 2015; 11 years ago
- League: MNL-2
- 2016: 11th

United of Thanlyin Football Club (Burmese: သန္လ်င္ယူႏိုက္တက္ ေဘာလုံးအသင္း) is a Burmese football club, founded in 2015. This is the first time MNL-2 season of United of Thanlyin FC.
