= Dagon Star United F.C. =

Burmese football club

Dagon Star United ဒဂုံဘောလုံးအသင်
- Full name: Dagon Star United Football Club
- Nicknames: The Brewers; The Brewing Lions
- Founded: 2009; 17 years ago
- Ground: Various
- Owner: Myo Aung Oo
- Chairman: Thein Hlaing Phyo
- Head coach: Rui Gregório
- League: Myanmar National League
- 2025–26: MNL, 3rd of 12
Home colours	Away colours

Dagon Star United Football Club (Burmese: ဒဂုံဘောလုံးအသင်း) is a Burmese professional football club based in Dagon Township, Yangon, founded in 2009. In 2022, Dagon FC changed the name to Dagon Star United Football Club.

== History ==
=== Early years and MNL-2 (2009–2018) ===
Founded in 2009 as Dagon Football Club, the team began competing in the MNL-2, the second tier of Burmese football. Over the years, Dagon FC showed consistent performance, culminating in a runner-up finish in the 2018 MNL-2 season, which secured their promotion to the top-tier Myanmar National League (MNL) for the 2019 season.

=== Transition to top flight and rebranding (2019–2022) ===
In their debut MNL season, Dagon FC faced challenges, finishing 11th out of 12 clubs. After a brief hiatus from competition, the club returned to the MNL-2 in 2022. That year marked a significant change as the club rebranded to Dagon Stars United Football Club.

=== Recent performance (2023–present) ===
Dagon Stars United made a strong comeback in the 2023 MNL season, finishing 5th. The 2024–25 season saw further improvement, with the club securing 4th place in the league standings. Additionally, they reached the semi-finals of the MNL Cup in 2024, highlighting their growing competitiveness in Burmese football.

== Logo ==
Club logo used until 2022

== 2026-27 Squad-list ==
As of October 2026

Note: Flags indicate national team as defined under FIFA eligibility rules; some limited exceptions apply. Players may hold more than one non-FIFA nationality.

No.	Pos.	Nation	Player
1	GK	MYA	Chit Min Htwe
3	DF	MYA	Soe Lin Aung
4	DF	MYA	Kyaw Thiha Zaw
5	DF	MYA	Ye Pyae Sone
6	MF	MYA	Aung Hlaing Win
7	FW	MYA	Thiha Zaw (Captain)
8	MF	CMR	Messo
9	FW	MYA	Yan Kyaw Htwe
10	FW	CMR	Eric Cantona
11	MF	MYA	Phoe Thauk Kyar
17	MF	MYA	Aung Thiha
19	DF	MYA	Sa Khant Chaw
20	DF	MYA	Hein Zaw Naing
22	GK	MYA	Han Myint Myat Tun
23	GK	MYA	Hein Hte Soe

No.	Pos.	Nation	Player
24	DF	MYA	Thuya Kyaw
26	MF	MYA	Ye Yint Phyo
30	DF	MYA	Wai Yan Lin Thu
40	DF	CIV	Kekere Moukailou
45	DF	MYA	Aung Kyaw Thu
70	MF	MYA	Njoh Eoems
77	MF	MYA	Swan Htet
99	FW	MYA	Patrick Edubat
—	DF	MYA	Tun Tun Thein
—	DF	MYA	Zarni Htet
—	MF	MYA	Ywar Du Moo
—	MF	MYA	Saw Min Khant Naing
—	MF	MYA	Zin Min Shine
—	MF	MYA	Win Htay

== Coaching staff ==
Position	Staff
Head coach	(Portugal) Rui Gregório
Assistant coach	(Myanmar) U Myint Swe
Goalkeeper coach	
Fitness coach	
Doctor	
Physiotherapist	
Team manager	

== Statistics ==
=== Domestic ===
Season	League									League Cup	Top goalscorer		Coach
Season	Div.	Pos.	Pl.	W	D	L	GS	GA	P	League Cup	Name	Goals	Coach
2013	MNL-2	7	16	3	3	10	26	34	12				
2014	MNL-2	3	26	11	0	6	31	18	33	Second round			
2015	MNL-2	4	18	10	4	4	38	17	34	First round	(Myanmar)		
2016	MNL-2	9	22	4	8	10	25	36	20	First round	(Myanmar)		
2017	MNL-2	8	18	5	3	10	20	20	18	First round	(Myanmar)		
2018	MNL-2	2	12	5	5	2	23	17	20	Second round	(Myanmar) Zaw Lin Oo	9	
2019	1st	11	22	5	3	14	29	46	18	Second round	(Cameroon) Patrick Edubat	10	(Myanmar) U Kyaw Lwin
2022	MNL-2	3	10	5	5	0	15	18	20		(Myanmar) Phoe Chit	7	(Myanmar) Nada Kyaw
2023	1st	5	22	9	4	9	33	31	31		(Myanmar) Nyi Nyi Aung	7	(Myanmar) U Min Tun Lin
2024	1st									Semi final			

== Honours ==
Type	Competition	Titles	Title seasons	Runners-up	Runners-up seasons	Other	Other seasons
League	MNL-2	0	–	1	2018	–	–
Cup	MNL Cup	0	–	–	–	Semi-final	2024
Youth	MNL U-20 Youth League	0	–	1	2018	–	–
Youth	MNL U-18 Youth League	1	2018	1	2017	–	–
