= Thanlyin Technological University FC =

Thihadeepa FC
- Full name: Thihadeepa United Football Club
- Founded: 2013; 12 years ago
- Owner: Daw Kay Thi Lwin
- Manager: U Htet Arkar Nway
- Coach: U Tint Nyein
- League: MNL-2

Thihadeepa United Football Club is a Burmese football club, based at Thanlyin, Yangon. 2016 MNL-2 season is their first time MNL pro season. Thihadeepa is a university team and play in MNL-2. Thihadeepa teams retired the number 12 for their supporters.

== History ==
Thihadeepa United FC was founded on 3 September 2013 at Thanlyin Technological University. Thiha Dipa Team and Pada Team combined and became Thanlyin Technological University FC. And then, they played in University Leagues. Name changed to 'Thihadeepa United FC'.

== Players ==
=== First-team squad (2016) ===
Note: Flags indicate national team as defined under FIFA eligibility rules; some limited exceptions apply. Players may hold more than one non-FIFA nationality.

No.	Pos.	Nation	Player
2	DF	MYA	Aung Thu
3	DF	MYA	Arkar Phyo
4	DF	MYA	Kaung Myat San
5	DF	MYA	Ye Min Aung
6	MF	MYA	Arkar Nyein
7	MF	MYA	Chit Ko Ko Naing
8	MF	MYA	Htoo Lapyae Wonn
9	FW	MYA	Kyaw Kyaw Oo
10	MF	MYA	Htun Win Oo
11	FW	MYA	Pyae Phyo San
13	GK	MYA	Nay Naing Htun
14	MF	MYA	Kaung Khant Maung Maung

No.	Pos.	Nation	Player
16	DF	MYA	Wai Phyo Htet
17	MF	MYA	Aung San Lin
18	GK	MYA	Kaung Myat Min
19	MF	MYA	Myo Min Kyaw
23	DF	MYA	Thiha Paing
26	DF	MYA	Yin Paing Soe
29	FW	MYA	Nayzar Khine Phone
30	DF	MYA	Saw Soe Myint Khine

- retired the number 12 for their supporters.
