= Rifqi Farandi =

Indonesian footballer (born 2004)

Personal information
- Full name: Rifqi Ray Farandi
- Date of birth: 22 June 2004 (age 22)
- Place of birth: Sukoharjo, Indonesia
- Height: 1.82 m (6 ft 0 in)
- Positions: Attacking midfielder; right winger

Team information
- Current team: Madura United
- Number: 78

Youth career
- SSB Bonansa
- 2020: PSSA Asahan U15
- 2016–2021: PFA Sukoharjo
- 2021: Bhayangkara U18
- 2022–2024: Persis Solo U20

Senior career*
Years	Team	Apps	(Gls)
2023–2024	Persis Solo	2	(0)
2024–2026	Persik Kediri	24	(1)
2026–	Madura United	2	(0)

International career^{‡}
2025	Indonesia U22	1	(0)
- * Club domestic league appearances and goals as of 9 October 2026 ‡ National team caps and goals as of 13 October 2025

Rifqi Ray Farandi (born 22 June 2004) is an Indonesian professional footballer who plays as an attacking midfielder or right winger for Super League club Madura United.

== Club career ==
=== Persis Solo ===
Ray started his youth career through several academies including SSB Bonansa and PFA Sukoharjo before joining the Persis Solo youth system. He made his professional debut for Persis Solo on 23 July 2023 in a Liga 1 match against Madura United. In the 2023–24 season, he appeared in two matches.

=== Persik Kediri ===
In July 2024, Ray signed with fellow Liga 1 club Persik Kediri. On 18 September 2024, Ray made his league debut for the club in 1–0 win over Persita Tangerang, coming on as a substitute. On 21 December 2024, he made his first start in a 3–1 win over Semen Padang. Six days later, he scored his first career professional goal in a 4–0 win over Borneo. In the following 2025–26 season, he added 5 more appearances. In June 2026, the club announced that Ray and five other players had officially been released. During his two seasons with Persik Kediri, Ray made a total of 24 appearances and scored 1 goal.

=== Madura United ===
On 5 July 2026, Ray joined Madura United on a free transfer ahead of the 2026–27 season. He made his club debut on 18 September 2026, appearing as a substitute in a 2–1 home victory against PSIM Yogyakarta.

== International career ==
In October 2025, Ray represented the Indonesia U22, he made his international debut for youth national team on 13 October 2025, playing as a substituted in a friendly match against India U22.

In December 2025, he was called up by Indonesia under-22 national team manager Indra Sjafri as a replacement for the injured Marselino Ferdinan ahead of the 2025 SEA Games.

== Career statistics ==
=== Club ===
As of 9 October 2026

Club	Season	League			Cup		Other		Total	
Club	Season	Division	Apps	Goals	Apps	Goals	Apps	Goals	Apps	Goals
Persis Solo	2023–24	Liga 1	2	0	0	0	0	0	2	0
Persis Solo	Total		2	0	0	0	0	0	2	0
Persik Kediri	2024–25	Liga 1	19	1	0	0	0	0	19	1
Persik Kediri	2025–26	Super League	5	0	0	0	0	0	5	0
Persik Kediri	Total		24	1	0	0	0	0	24	1
Madura United	2026–27	Super League	2	0	0	0	0	0	2	0
Career total			28	1	0	0	0	0	28	1

== Honours ==
Persis Solo U-20

- Elite Pro Academy Liga 1 U-20: 2023–24
