= 2014 MNL-2 =

MNL-2
- Season: 2014
- Champions: Hantharwady United
- Promoted: Hantharwady United; Rakhine United
- Matches: 83
- Goals: 298 (3.59 per match)

The 2014 MNL-2 New Holland League is the second edition of MNL-2. The first round of the season began on 1 February and ended on 28 March. The schedule for the second round will be released after completion of the first round. The two guest teams taking part in MNL-2 will not be qualified to either MNL or MFF Cup.

== To MNL-2 ==
Promoted from

- No team will be promoted until the introduction of MNL-3 in coming years.

Relegated from MNL

- Hantharwady United
- Rakhine United

== From MNL-2 ==
Promoted to MNL

- TBD

Relegation

- It is understood that MFF is in the process of establishing a third-tier league, MNL-3 in coming years. Until then no team will be relegated.

== Teams ==
The 2014 MNL-2 season will have 10 teams playing for promotion to the Myanmar National League. The teams are:-

- Best United FC
- Horizon FC
- Hantharwady United
- Mawyawadi FC
- Myawady FC
- Rakhine United
- Myanmar U-19 (guest team)
- Dagon FC
- Silver Stars FC
- University FC (guest team)

== Stadium ==
Matches are planned to play in Salin Stadium and Padonmar Stadium with a League cup format.

== League table ==
Pos	Team	Pld	W	D	L	GF	GA	GD	Pts	Promotion
1	Hantharwady United (C)	17	14	3	0	48	1	+47	45	Promotion to 2015 Myanmar National League
2	Rakhine United	18	13	4	1	60	10	+50	43	Promotion to 2015 Myanmar National League
3	Dagon	17	11	0	6	31	18	+13	33	
4	Myawady	16	8	4	4	30	22	+8	28	
5	Mawyawadi	16	6	3	7	30	25	+5	21	
6	Best United	17	6	2	9	28	44	−16	20	
7	Myanmar U-19	16	6	1	9	21	36	−15	19	
8	Horizon	16	5	1	10	20	26	−6	16	
9	University	17	3	0	14	22	65	−43	9	
10	Silver Stars	16	2	0	14	8	46	−38	6	

Rules for classification: 1) points; 2) goal difference; 3) number of goals scored.
(C) Champions

== Season statistics ==
=== Top scorers ===
As of Week-6

No	Player	Club	Goals
1	Bam Ba	Hantharwady United	6
1	Aung Soe Moe	Rakhine United	6
1	Naing Naing Kyaw	Mawyawadi	6
4	Chi Ka	Hantharwady United	5
5	Soe Paing	Dagon	4
5	Myint Naing	Rakhine United	4
5	Than Paing	Myanmar U-19	4
8	Ye Khaung	Best United	3
8	Thiha Soe	Dagon	3
8	Saw Naing Moe Aung	All-University Selection	3

== See also ==
- 2014 Myanmar National League
- 2014 MFF Cup
