= Thitsar Arman F.C. =

Football club in Myanmar National League

Thitsar Arman
- Full name: Thitsar Arman Football Club
- Founded: 2023; 3 years ago
- Owner: Fire Service Department (under Ministry of Home Affairs)
- Head coach: U Paw Tun Kyaw
- League: Myanmar National League
- 2024-25: 8th

Thitsar Arman Football Club (Burmese: သစ္စာအားမာန် ဘောလုံး အသင်း) is a Burmese professional football club based in Dagon Township, founded in 2023.

== History ==
=== 2023 season ===
Thitsar Arman was founded in 2023 and played in its inaugural MNL-2 season. At the end of the 2023 MNL-2, they won the MNL-2 title.Thitsar Arman still at Myanmar National League after relegation battle with Myawady.

=== 2025-26 season ===
Thitsar Arman FC secured their first win of the 2025–26 Myanmar National League season with a 2–1 victory over Yangon United on September 21, 2025, at Thuwunna Stadium. This win was significant for Thitsar Arman, as it marked their first points of the season. Prior to this match, they had accumulated only 1 point from 3 matches, placing them 10th in the standings. In contrast, Yangon United entered the match as the league leaders, having won their previous two games. Despite their strong start to the season, they were unable to maintain their unbeaten record against Thitsar Arman.This result adds to the competitive nature of the Myanmar National League, where teams like Thitsar Arman are striving to challenge the dominance of established clubs like Yangon United .

== Honour ==
- MNL-2
  - Champion (1): 2023

== Men Squad ==
As of May 2025

Note: Flags indicate national team as defined under FIFA eligibility rules; some limited exceptions apply. Players may hold more than one non-FIFA nationality.

No.	Pos.	Nation	Player
1	GK	MYA	Naing Lin Aung
3	DF	MYA	Phone Thet Khaing
5	DF	MYA	Aung Tun Tun
6	MF	MYA	Yell Min Kyaw
7	MF	MYA	Min Maw Oo
8	MF	MYA	Aung Kyaw Hein
9	FW	MYA	Naing Win Tun
10	FW	MYA	Pyae Sone Aung
11	MF	MYA	Hla Tun
12	DF	MYA	Myat Phone Khant
13	MF	MYA	Sithu Win
15	MF	MYA	Saw Naing Oo

No.	Pos.	Nation	Player
17	FW	MYA	Saw Myo Zaw
18	GK	MYA	A Zin Hmue
19	MF	MYA	Lin Htet Oo
20	MF	MYA	Wunna Hlaing Shein
23	DF	MYA	Thant Zin Oo
25	MF	MYA	Saw Htoo Phwe Moo
26	MF	MYA	Hein Min Oo
29	MF	MYA	Hla Myo
30	GK	MYA	Aung Thet Oo
77	MF	MYA	Ye Kaung Sat
99	MF	MYA	Shine Wunna Aung
