= Myawady F.C. =

Myawady မြဝတီဘောလုံးအသင်း
- Full name: Myawady Football Club
- Nickname: Son's of the Old Man
- Founded: 2009; 17 years ago
- Ground: Wunna Theikdi Stadium
- Capacity: 30,000
- Owner: Ministry of Defence
- Manager: U Kyaw ThuAung Myint Tun (men) & U Htet Aung(women)
- League: Myanmar National League
Home colours	Away colours

Myawady Football Club (Burmese: မြဝတီဘောလုံးအသင်း Burmese pronunciation: [Myawady]) is a professional football club, based in Naypyidaw Union Territory. Its women's section plays in the Myanmar Women League.

== Mean team Honours ==
=== Domestics ===
- Myanmar National League
  - 2nd runners-up (1): 2022
- MNL-2
  - Runners-up (1): 2020

=== Youth competitions ===
- MNL U-20 Youth League
  - Champion (1): 2019
  - Runners-up (1): 2017
- MNL U-19 Youth League
  - Champion (1): 2015
- MNL U-18 Youth League
  - Champion (1): 2017

== 2026-27 squad list ==
Note: Flags indicate national team as defined under FIFA eligibility rules; some limited exceptions apply. Players may hold more than one non-FIFA nationality.

No.	Pos.	Nation	Player
2	DF	MYA	Saung Oo Hlaing
3	DF	MYA	Myat Thu Aung
5	DF	MYA	Htet Wai Phyo
6	MF	MYA	Maung Maung Win
8	FW	MYA	Khin Kyaw Win
9	FW	MYA	That Paing Ko
10	FW	MYA	Yell Moe Yan
11	FW	MYA	Thant Zin Aung
14	MF	MYA	Aung Thu
16	MF	MYA	Zaw Htet Paing
17	FW	MYA	Naing Zin Htet
18	GK	MYA	Hein Htet Naing
19	DF	MYA	Myat Min Oo

No.	Pos.	Nation	Player
20	DF	MYA	Thaw Zin Htwe
21	DF	MYA	Thiha Zaw
22	MF	MYA	Min Ko Thu
23	DF	MYA	Htun Thu Aung
25	GK	MYA	Sai Linn Phyoe
27	FW	MYA	Htet Lin Aung
31	MF	MYA	Ye Pyae Naung
35	MF	MYA	Benjamin
36	MF	MYA	Aye Chan Aung
37	FW	MYA	Pyae Phyoe Aung
38	FW	MYA	Soe Thet Maung
40	DF	MYA	Thiha Aung
47	DF	MYA	Kaung Htet Lin
—	FW	MYA	Aung Myat Thu

== Statistics ==
=== Domestic ===
Season	League									League Cup	Top goalscorer		Manager
Season	Div.	Pos.	Pl.	W	D	L	GS	GA	P	League Cup	Name	Goals	Manager
2013	MNL-2	3	16	8	4	4	27	18	28		(Myanmar)		(Myanmar)
2014	MNL-2	4	16	8	4	4	30	22	28	Third round	(Myanmar)		(Myanmar)
2015	MNL-2	5	18	9	3	6	58	28	30	Second rounds	(Myanmar)		(Myanmar)
2016	MNL-2	5	22	10	6	6	46	23	36	Quarterfinal	(Myanmar)		(Myanmar)
2017	MNL-2	3▲	18	11	2	5	40	17	35	First round	(Myanmar) Ye Wai Yan Soe	12	(Myanmar)
2018	1st	12▼	22	0	2	20	12	66	2	First rounds	(Myanmar) kaung SiThu	2	(Myanmar) U Ko Ko Oo
2019	MNL-2	3	14	8	4	2	31	9	28	Second round	(Myanmar) Phone Kyaw Zin	8	(Myanmar)
2020	MNL-2	2 ▲	7	6	0	1	15	6	18		(Myanmar) Kaung SiThu	6	(Myanmar)
2022	1st	4	18	10	1	7	29	18	31		(Myanmar) Naing Zin Htet	8	(Myanmar) U Maung Maung Aye
2023	1st	6	22	9	4	9	34	48	31		(Myanmar) Naing Zin Htet	7	(Myanmar) U Maung Maung Aye
2024	1st									Group stage			

== Myawady Women team ==
Myawady Women team was founded at 2016 and played at the Myanmar Women League. Myawady women team won Myanmar Women League title for 3 times.

=== Women team Honours ===
- Myanmar Women League
  - Winner(3): 2016-17, 2017-18, 2023
  - Runners-up (1):2018-19

=== Continental Women's record ===
International all results (home and away) lis ISPE goal tally first.

Season	Competition	Round	Club	Home	Away	Aggregate
2024-25	AFC Women's Champions League	Preliminary stage	(Saudi Arabia) Al-Nassr	0-3		4th
2024-25	AFC Women's Champions League	Preliminary stage	(United Arab Emirates) Abu Dhabi Country Club	1-0		4th
2024-25	AFC Women's Champions League	Preliminary stage	(Laos) Young Elephants	0-3		4th
