= 2023 MNL-2 =

MNL-2
- Season: 2023
- Dates: 24 April 2023 – 12 September 2023
- Champions: Thitsar Arman
- Runner up: University
- Promoted: Thitsar Arman; Dagon Port
- Relegated: Mawyawadi FC; Golden Grit
- Matches: 90
- Goals: 291 (3.23 per match)
- Top goalscorer: Than Zaw Hein; Zaw Zaw Htike (20 goals)
- Best goalkeeper: Naing Lin Oo (9 Clean sheets)
- Biggest home win: Thitsar Arman 6–0 Mawyawadi (18 June)
- Biggest away win: Port 1–6 Thitsar Arman (25 June)
- Highest scoring: Port 1–6 Thitsar Arman (25 June)
- Longest winless run: Golden Grit (9 matches)

The 2023 Myanmar National League Two, is the 11th season of the MNL-2, the second division league for association football clubs since its founding in 2012.

It has been decided to hold the MNL2 league with a total of ten teams. In the league includes the MFF's youth team called Junior Lions and nine other clubs.

== Summary ==
After the end of 2023 MNL-2, Thitsar Arman became a first time ever champion in their history. And MNL-2 becomes the New champion. 2022 MNL Champion University finished at 2nd place. Thitsar Arman and University will promote to 2024 Myanmar National League. If University does not pass the MNL criteria, Port FC is promoted to 2024 Myanmar National League. Mawyawadi FC and Golden Grit relegated to Myanmar Amateur League.

== Clubs ==
After the MNL 2 meeting, it was decided that 10 teams will participate in the league. For this to happen, there were multiple clubs created this year. From the 2022 season, there are three clubs. Defending champions University were unable to be promoted so they continue playing in MNL-2, and Mawyawadi who failed to gain promotion to the first tier. Junior Lions is a team consisting of players under the age of 18, and as a club based in MFF, they are also unable to be promoted.

One club returned after an absence from the 2022 season. Silver Stars made their return to the MNL-2, after not appearing in the 2022 MNL-2. Newly founded clubs were Glory Goal, Shwe Pyi Thar, Port, Golden Grit and Thitsar Arman FC. Rakhapura United made its return as well but as the affiliate club of MNL team Rakhine United.

=== Personnel and sponsoring ===
Note: Flags indicate national team as has been defined under FIFA eligibility rules. Players may hold more than one non-FIFA nationality.

Team	Head coach	Captain	Kit manufacturer	Shirt sponsor
Glory Goal	(Myanmar) U Win Maung	(Myanmar) Hein Htet Aung	(Myanmar) M21	(Myanmar) Pa Pa World
Golden Grit	(Myanmar) U Than Hteik	(Myanmar) Soe Thu Ya Zaw	(Thailand) Warrix	
Junior Lions	(Myanmar) U Aung Naing	(Myanmar) Pyae Sone Aung	(Thailand) Warrix	
Mawyawadi	(Myanmar) U Phone Naing	(Myanmar) Kyaw Kyaw Tun	(Myanmar) SCM	(Myanmar) M.Life
Port	(Myanmar) U Htet Aung	(Myanmar) Naing Lin Oo	(Thailand) Pro Sport	(Myanmar) Htet Myat Yadana
Rakhapura United	(Myanmar) U Ayar Maung	(Myanmar) That Tun Aung	(Myanmar) Foxx	
Shwe Pyi Thar	(Myanmar) U Shwe Tin	(Myanmar) Shwe Thein	(Myanmar) SCM	
Silver Stars	(Myanmar) Daw Aye Aye Maw	(Myanmar) Thet Lwin Soe	(Thailand) Pro Sport	
Thitsar Arman	(Myanmar) U Paw Tun Kyaw	(Myanmar) Thant Zaw Hein	(Thailand) Warrix	(Myanmar) Sport Bar
University	(Myanmar) U Zaw Min	(Myanmar) Than Myat Soe	(Myanmar) Glory Sport	

=== League table ===
Pos	Team	Pld	W	D	L	GF	GA	GD	Pts	Promotion or relegation
1	Thitsar Arman	18	14	2	2	55	10	+45	44	2024 Myanmar National League
2	University	18	12	2	4	53	23	+30	38	
3	Port	18	11	1	6	39	28	+11	34	2024 Myanmar National League
4	Junior Lions	18	9	6	3	29	17	+12	33	
5	Glory Goal FC	18	5	7	6	23	25	−2	22	
6	Shwe Pyi Thar FC	18	6	4	8	30	35	−5	22	
7	Silver Star	18	5	1	12	20	49	−29	16	
8	Rakhapura United	18	2	8	8	18	31	−13	14	
9	Mawyawadi FC	18	4	2	12	22	39	−17	14	Relegation to 2024 MNL 3[Amateur League]
10	Golden Grit FC	18	3	5	10	14	46	−32	14	Relegation to 2024 MNL 3[Amateur League]

Source: National League 2
- University did not meet with MNL Criteria.

== Matches ==
Fixtures and results of the 2023 MNL-2.

=== Week 1 ===
24 April 2023	Thitsar Arman	1–2	Junior Lions	Sa Lin Stadium, Yangon
15:30 UTC+06:30	Saw Myo Zaw 63'		Pyae Sone Aung 80' (pen.), 84'

24 April 2023	Silver Stars	1–0	Rakhapura United	Padonmar Stadium, Yangon
15:30 UTC+06:30	Okkar Soe 26'

25 May 2023	Mawyawadi	0–2	Port	Sa Lin Stadium, Yangon
15:30 UTC+06:30			Zin Ko Ko Maung 47'; Paing Soe Wai 71' (pen.)

25 May 2023	Glory Goal	5–0	Golden Grit	Padonmar Stadium, Yangon
15:30 UTC+06:30	Sanda Naing 41', 45', 56'; Thura 50'; Hein Thant 88'

26 April 2023	Shwe Pyi Thar	0–4	University	Padonmar Stadium, Yangon
15:30 UTC+06:30			Than Myat Soe 72' (pen.); Sa Khant Chaw 78'; Zaw Zaw Hteik 80', 83'

=== Week 2 ===
30 April 2023	Junior Lions	0–0	Rakhapura United	Sa Lin Stadium, Yangon
15:30 UTC+06:30

30 April 2023	Glory Goal	0–1	Mawyawadi	Padonmar Stadium, Yangon
15:30 UTC+06:30			Myo Set Naing 49'

1 May 2023	Golden Grit	0–3	Silver Stars	Sa Lin Stadium, Yangon
15:30 UTC+06:30			Hein Htet Aung 21'; Okkar soe 57'; Wine Htet Paing 86'

2 May 2023	Shwe Pyi Thar	0–1	Port	Padonmar Stadium, Yangon
15:30 UTC+06:30			Myo Sat Paing 50'

2 May 2023	University	0–1	Thitsar Arman	Sa Lin Stadium, Yangon
15:30 UTC+06:30			Min Maw Oo 23'

=== Week 3 ===
18 May 2023	Port	2–4	University	Sa Lin Stadium, Yangon
15:30 UTC+06:30	Myo Sat Paing 11'; Kaung Khant Kyaw 90+1' (o.g)		Kaung Khant Kyaw 54'; San Pyae Sone 59'; Hlaing Bwar 69'; Than Myat Soe 84' (pen.)

18 May 2023	Rakhapuara United	0–4	Thitsar Arman	Padonmar Stadium, Yangon
15:30 UTC+06:30			Aung Zaw Myo 30'; Saw Myo Zaw 66'; Thant Zaw Hein 79', 89'

19 May 2023	Golden Grit	1–1	Junior Lions	Padonmar Stadium, Yangon
15:30 UTC+06:30	Hlaing Moe Oo 11'		Pyae Sone Aung 90+4'

19 May 2023	Shwe Pyi Thar	0–0	Glory Goal	Sa Lin Stadium, Yangon
15:30 UTC+06:30

20 May 2023	Mawyawadi	1–2	Silver Stars	Padonmar Stadium, Yangon
15:30 UTC+06:30	Kyaw Zaya 14'		Thet Win Tun 63'; Okkar Soe 73'

=== Week 4 ===
24 May 2023	Silver Stars	0–3	Thitsar Arman	Sa Lin Stadium, Yangon
15:30 UTC+06:30			Thann Zaw Hein 17'; Min Maw Oo 59'; Aung Kyaw Hein 81'

24 May 2023	University	3–2	Junior Lions	Padonmar Stadium, Yangon
15:30 UTC+06:30	Aung Naing Soe 14'; Kaung Khant Kyaw 16'; Hliang Bwar 76'		Shine Wunna Aung 9'; Pyae Sone Aung 55'

25 May 2023	Port	4–1	Golden Grit	Padonmar Stadium, Yangon
15:30 UTC+06:30	Myat Tun Thit 24'; Zin Ko Ko Maug 43'; Kyaw Myint Win 89'; Myo Sat Paing 88'		Thu Ta Zaw 7'

25 May 2023	Gloray Goal	1–1	Rakhapura United	Sa Lin Stadium, Yangon
15:30 UTC+06:30	Pyae Phyo Win 54'		Tun Naing Soe 5'

26 May 2023	Shwe Pyi Thar	3–1	Mawyawadi	Padonmar Stadium, Yangon
15:30 UTC+06:30	Arkar Win 60'; Nay Lin Htet 84'; Shwe Thein 88'		Kyaw Chue 13'

=== Week 5 ===
30 May 2023	Thitsar Arman	2–0	Glory Goal	Sa Lin Stadium, Yangon
15:30 UTC+06:30	Saw Myo Zaw 45+2'; Zin Maung Maung 63'

30 May 2023	University	6–3	Mawyawadi	Padonmar Stadium, Yangon
15:30 UTC+06:30	Sa Khant Chaw 10', 44'; Zaw Zaw Htike 45+2', 46', 60'; Hlaing Bwar 69'		Thant Zin Aung 48'; Kyaw Zaya 56'; Kyaw Kyaw Tun 74' (pen.)

31 May 2023	Silver Stars	1–2	Junior Lions	Padonmar Stadium, Yangon
15:30 UTC+06:30	Okkar Soe 31'		Sitt Paing Tun 14'; Swam Wunna Aung 52' (pen.); Pyae Sone Aung 71'

31 May 2023	Golden Grit	0–4	Shwe Pyi Thar	Sa Lin Stadium, Yangon
15:30 UTC+06:30			Shwe Thein 65', 81'; Kyaw Pyae Sone 76', 86'

1 June 2023	Rakhapura United	1–2	Port	Padonmar Stadium, Yangon
15:30 UTC+06:30	Nyi Nyi Tun 4'		Aung Thu Ra 82'; Myat Tu Thit 90' (pen.)

=== Week 6 ===
5 June 2023	Thitsar Arman	3–1	Shwe Pyi Thar	Padonmar Stadium, Yangon
15:30 UTC+06:30	Thant Zaw Hein 40'; Saw Myo Zaw 45+1'; Nay Ye Han 52'		Yan Naing Oo 54'

5 June 2023	Mawyawadi	1–1	Rakhapura United	Sa Lin Stadium, Yangon
15:30 UTC+06:30	Moe Sat Paing 67'		Nyi Nyi Tun 45'

6 June 2023	Golden Grit	0–4	University	Padonmar Stadium, Yangon
15:30 UTC+06:30			Zaw Zaw Htike 23', 33'; Kaung Khant Kyaw 68'; Kaung Khant Zaw 86'

7 June 2023	Junior Lion	2–1	Port	Sa Lin Stadium, Yangon
15:30 UTC+06:30	Pyae Sone Aung 13', 65'		Lin Htet Ko Ko 83'

7 June 2023	Glory Gold	3–0	Silver Stars	Padonmar Stadium, Yangon
15:30 UTC+06:30	Thura 3'; Wai Phyo Zaw 53'; Wunna Zaw 70'

=== Week 7 ===
11 June 2023	Silver Star	1–4	Shwe Pyi Thar	Padonmar Stadium, Yangon
15:30 UTC+06:30	Win Ko Ko Tun 54'		Kaung Htet Kyaw 10'; Yan Naing Oo 45', 64'; Thel Maung Htwe 74'

12 June 2023	Rakhapura United	3–1	University	Padonmar Stadium, Yangon
15:30 UTC+06:30	Nyi Nyi Tun 3', 62'; Kaung Htet Hein 17'		Hlaing Bwar 17'

12 June 2023	Thitsar Arman	5–1	Golden Grit	Sa Lin Stadium, Yangon
15:30 UTC+06:30	Saw Myo Zaw 13', 88'; Thant Zaw Hein 42'; Hein Htet Aung 85'; Hla Myo 86'		Phyo Ko Ko 47' (pen.)

13 June 2023	Port	5–0	Glory Gold	Sa Lin Stadium, Yangon
15:30 UTC+06:30	Myo Sat Paing 32'; Kyaw Myint Win 38', 55'; Kaung Myat Han 39'; Chit Thet Oo 74'

13 June 2023	Mawyawadi	0–2	Junior Lions	Padonmar Stadium, Yangon
15:30 UTC+06:30			Shine Wunna Aung 52'; Win Ko Htay 76'

=== Week 8 ===
3 June 2023	University	1–0	Glory Goal	Padonmar Stadium, Yangon
15:45 UTC+06:30	Zaw Zaw Hteik 24'

17 June 2023	Golden Grit	0–3	Rakhapura United	Padonmar Stadium, Yangon
15:45 UTC+06:30			Chan Nyein Zaw 30'; Kaung Myat Kyaw 84'; Nyi Nyi Tun 90+3'

18 June 2023	Port	3–2	Silver Star	Salin Stadium, Yangon
15:30 UTC+06:30	Pyae Sone Wai 45' (pen.); Kyaw Myint Win 65', 90+2'		Thet Win Tun 34'; Kyaw Phyo Oo 51'

18 June 2023	Thitsar Arman	6–0	Mawyawadi	Padonmar Stadium, Yangon
15:30 UTC+06:30	Aung Kyaw Hein 15', 32'; Thant Zaw Hein 24'; Hein Htet Aung 60', 71'; Saw Myo Zaw 67' (pen.)

29 June 2023 (postpone)	Junior Lions	3–1	Shwe Pyi Thar	Padonmar Stadium, Yangon
15:30 UTC+06:30	Shin Wanna Aung 13'; Win Ko Htay 78'; Myo Min Khant 84'		Yan Naing Oo 80'

=== Week 9 ===
23 June 2023	Mawyawadi	5–0	Golden Grit	Padonmar Stadium, Yangon
15:45 UTC+06:30	Min Khant Thein 3', 41'; Aung Ko Ko 59', 71', 90+1'

24 June 2023	Junior Lion	1–1	Glory Goal	Padonmar Stadium, Yangon
16:00 UTC+06:30	Shine Wanna Aung 90+3'		Thura 14'

25 June 2023	Rakhapura United	2–2	Shwe Pyi Thar	Salin Stadium, Yangon
16:00 UTC+06:30	Thet Tun AUng 33' (pen.); Nyi Nyi Tun 45'		Thel Maung Htwe 59'; Thaw Aung Kyaw 82' (o.g)

25 June 2023	Port	1–6	Thit Sar Arman	Padonmar Stadium, Yangon
15:45 UTC+06:30	Saw Htoo Pwe Moo 30' (o.g)		Min Maw Oo 4'; Thant Zaw Hein 11', 32', 50'; Saw Myo Zaw 83'; Win Zaw Hein 90+2'

15 June 2023 (postpone)	Silver Stars	2–6	University	Padonmar Stadium, Yangon
15:45 UTC+06:30	Kyaw Phyo Oo 30' (o.g); Hein Htet Aung 87'		Zaw Zaw Hteik 11', 34', 90+1'; Than Myat Soe 25'; Aung Nain gSoe 29'; Myint Naing Thu 77'

=== Week 10 ===
15 July 2023	Silver Star	1–2	Glory Grit	Sa Lin Stadium, Yangon
15:45 UTC+06:30	Kyaw Swar Lin 68'		Ye Kaung Satt 63' (pen.); Htet Paing 73'

15 July 2023	Rakhapura United	0–4	Mawyawadi	Padonmar Stadium, Yangon
15:30 UTC+06:30			Kyaw Zayya 12'; Kyaw Kyaw Tun 34'; Myo Set Paing 60', 85'

16 July 2023	University	2–2	Golden Grit	Salin Stadium, Yangon
15:30 UTC+06:30	Zaw Zaw Htike 28'; Kaung Khant Kyaw 66'		Zin Ko 14'; Chit Htwe 90+2'

16 July 2023	Port	1–1	Junior Lions	Padonmar Stadium, Yangon
15:45 UTC+06:30	Myat Phone Khant 41' (o.g)		Myo Min Khant 31'

17 July 2023	Shwe Pyi Thar	0–3	Thitsar Arman	Sa Lin Stadium, Yangon
15:45 UTC+06:30			Thant Zaw Hein 9', 42', 87'

=== Week 11 ===
21 July 2023	Glory Goal	1–1	Thitsar Arman	Padonmar Stadium, Yangon
15:45 UTC+06:30	Pyae Phyo Win 57'		Thant Zaw Hein 22'

21 July 2023	Mawyawadi	0–2	University	Sa Lin Stadium, Yangon
15:30 UTC+06:30			Aung Naing Soe 18'; Zaw Zaw Htike 64'

22 July 2023	Junior Lions	1–0	Silver Stars	Salin Stadium, Yangon
15:30 UTC+06:30	Win Ko Htay 28'

22 July 2023	Shwe Pyi Thar	2–3	Golden Grit	Padonmar Stadium, Yangon
15:45 UTC+06:30	Naing Lin 16'; Thel Maung Htwe 77'		Aung Myo Oo 24'; Wai Yan Min Htet 49'; Chit Htwe 70'

24 July 2023	Port	2–1	Rakhapura United	Padonmar Stadium, Yangon
15:45 UTC+06:30	Wine Wine Chit 28'; Aye Ko Ko Maung 77'		Tun Naing Soe 11'

=== Week 12 ===
29 July 2023	Glory Goal	0–4	Port	Sa Lin Stadium, Yangon
15:45 UTC+06:30			Myo Sat Paing 5' (pen.); Kyaw Myint Win 8', 82'; Sai Zaw Zaw Khaing 66'

29 July 2023	Shwe Pyi Thar	3–0	Silvers Stars	Padonmar Stadium, Yangon
15:30 UTC+06:30	Thel Maung Htwe 16'; Nay Lin Htet 62'; Kaung Htet Kyaw 90+3'

30 July 2023	University	4–1	Rakhapura United	Salin Stadium, Yangon
15:30 UTC+06:30	Zaw Zaw Htike 36', 87'; Phyo Zay Aung 52'; Than Myat Soe 8' (pen.)		Naing UAng 30'

30 July 2023	Golden Grit	0–3	Thitsar Arman	Padonmar Stadium, Yangon
15:45 UTC+06:30			Saw Myo Zaw 39'; Aung Zaw Myint 59'; Thant Zaw Hein 75'

31 July 2023	Junior Lions	1–0	Mawyawadi	Sa Lin Stadium, Yangon
15:45 UTC+06:30	Mya Phone Khant 84'

=== Week 13 ===
5 August 2023	Silver Stars	2–1	Port	Sa Lin Stadium, Yangon
15:45 UTC+06:30	Tot Tet Lin 38'; Kyaw Swar Lin 81'		Sai Zaw Zaw Khaing 57'

5 August 2023	Glory Goal	0–1	University	Padonmar Stadium, Yangon
15:30 UTC+06:30			Zaw Zaw Hteik 49'

6 August 2023	Mawyawadi	1–4	Thitsar Arman	Salin Stadium, Yangon
15:30 UTC+06:30	Aung Ko Ko 40'		Zin Maung Maung 16'; Saw Myo Zaw 59'; Nay Ye Han 75'; Min Maw Oo 76'

6 August 2023	Rakhapura UNited	0–0	Golden Grit	Padonmar Stadium, Yangon
15:45 UTC+06:30

7 August 2023	Shwe Pyi Thar	2–4	Junior Lions	Sa Lin Stadium, Yangon
15:45 UTC+06:30	Kaung Htet Kyaw 59', 75'		Wai Lyan Shine 24'; Kaung Htet 47'; Aung Kaung Khant 65', 90+1'

=== Week 14 ===
12 August 2023	Thitsar Arman	3–0	Rakhapura United	Sa Lin Stadium, Yangon
15:45 UTC+06:30	Thant Zaw Hein 9'; Nay Ye Han 83', 89'

12 August 2023	University	1–2	Port	Padonmar Stadium, Yangon
15:30 UTC+06:30	Kaung Khant Zaw 38'		Aye Ko KO Maung 61'; Myo Sat Paing 67'

13 August 2023	Junior Lions	0–1	Golden Grit	Salin Stadium, Yangon
15:30 UTC+06:30			Aung Myo Kyaw 38' (pen.)

13 August 2023	Glory Goal	1–1	Shwe Pyi Thar	Padonmar Stadium, Yangon
15:45 UTC+06:30	Pyae Phyo Win 9'		Aung Thet San 87'

14 August 2023	Silver Stars	3–2	Mawyawadi	Sa Lin Stadium, Yangon
15:45 UTC+06:30	Kyaw Phyo Oo 16'; Kyaw Swar Lin 20'; Sai Thar Nyi 54'		Kyaw Zeya 34' (pen.), 38' (pen.)

=== Week 15 ===
22 August 2023	Glory Goal	1–1	Junior Lions	Sa Lin Stadium, Yangon
15:45 UTC+06:30	Khant Sithu 3'		Thura Zaw 54'

23 August 2023	University	7–1	Silver Stars	Padonmar Stadium, Yangon
15:30 UTC+06:30	Sa Khant Chaw 32'; Zaw Zaw Hteik 35', 38', 81'; Kaung Khant Zaw 58'; Aung Myint Myat 82', 89'		Thet Lwin Soe 36'

23 August 2023	Golden Grit	0–0	Mawyawadi	Salin Stadium, Yangon
15:30 UTC+06:30

24 August 2023	Shwe Pyi Thar	2–2	Rakhapura United	Padonmar Stadium, Yangon
15:45 UTC+06:30	Kyaw Pyae Sone 53', 68'		Nyi Nyi Htun 24'; Kaung Khant Hein 90+4'

24 August 2023	Thitsar Arman	0–1	Port	Sa Lin Stadium, Yangon
15:45 UTC+06:30			Kyaw Myint Win 64'

=== Week 16 ===
28 August 2023	Golden Grit	2–2	Glory Goal	Sa Lin Stadium, Yangon
15:45 UTC+06:30	Chit Htwe 4'; Zwe Ko Ko 90+2'		Aung Myat Min 34'; Htet Myat Lwin 87'

28 August 2023	Port	1–2	Mawyawadi	Padonmar Stadium, Yangon
15:30 UTC+06:30	Naing Lin Oo 41' (pen.)		Zaw Win Htet 32'; Aung Ko Ko 90+2'

29 August 2023	Rakhapuara United	1–1	Silver Stars	Salin Stadium, Yangon
15:30 UTC+06:30	Nyi Nyi Htun 50'		Kyaw Phyo Oo 61'

29 August 2023	Junior Lions	1–2	Thitsar Arman	Padonmar Stadium, Yangon
15:45 UTC+06:30	Pyae Sone Aung 15'		Saw Myo Zaw 11'; Aung Zaw Myint 67'

30 August 2023	University	4–0	Shwe Pyi Thar	Sa Lin Stadium, Yangon
15:45 UTC+06:30	Aung Naing Soe 48', 69'; Aung Myint Myat 57'; Kaung Khant Kyaw 83'

=== Week 17 ===
2 September 2023	Golden Grit	1–3	Port	Sa Lin Stadium, Yangon
15:45 UTC+06:30	Zwe Ko Ko 43'		Junior 12'; Htet Kyaw Lwin 17'; Myo Sat Paing 81'

3 September 2023	Rakhapura United	1–2	Glory Goal	Padonmar Stadium, Yangon
15:30 UTC+06:30	Nyi Nyi Htun 52'		Ye Thuya Tun 4'; Ye Kaung Sat 75'

3 September 2023	Thitsar Arman	7–0	Silver Stars	Salin Stadium, Yangon
15:30 UTC+06:30	Thant Zaw Hein 11', 25', 33', 35', 59'; Nay Ye Han 18'; Aung Zaw Myint 24'

4 September 2023	Mawyawadi	0–2	Shwe Pyi Thar	Sa Lin Stadium, Yangon
15:45 UTC+06:30			Naing Lin 11'; Kaung Htet Kyaw (1) 53'

4 September 2023	Junior Lions	3–1	University	Padonmar Stadium, Yangon
15:45 UTC+06:30	Pyae Sone Aung 53', 58'; Shine Wunna Aung 84'		Zaw Zaw Hteik 23'

=== Week 18 ===
8 September 2023	Silver Stars	0–2	Golden Grit	Padonmar Stadium, Yangon
15:45 UTC+06:30			Ko Ko Aung 81'; Chit Htwe 86'

9 September 2023	Mawyawadi	1–4	Glory Goal	Salin Stadium, Yangon
15:30 UTC+06:30	Zaw Win Htet 32'		Kyaw Chue 8' (o.g); Aung Myat Min 25'; Yarzar Myo Min 64', 69'

9 September 2023	Rakhapuara United	1–1	Junior Lions	Salin Stadium, Yangon
15:30 UTC+06:30	Kaung Khant Hein 15'		Kaung Htet 65'

10 September 2023	Port	3-4	Shwe Pyi Thar	Sa Lin Stadium, Yangon
15:45 UTC+06:30	Aung Thuya 8'; Kyaw Myint Win 30'; Junior 62'		Nay Lin Htet 39'; AUng Thet San 65', 85'; Tin Ko Ko Tun 82' (pen.)

12 September 2023	Thitsar Arman	1-1	University	Thuwunna Stadium, Yangon
15:45 UTC+06:30	Min Maw Oo 26'		Sa Khant Chaw 55'

== Season statistics ==
=== Top scorers ===
As of 11 September 2023.

Rank	Player	Club	Goals
1	(Myanmar) Than Zaw Hein	Thitsar Arman	20
1	(Myanmar) Zaw Zaw Htike	University	20
2	(Myanmar) Saw Myo Zaw	Thitsar Arman	11
3	(Myanmar) Pyae Sone Aung	Junior Lions	10
4	(Myanmar) Nyi Nyi Tun	Rakhapura FC	9
4	(Myanmar) Kyaw Myint Win	Port Fc	9
5	(Myanmar) Shine Wunna Aung	Junior Lions	6
6	(Myanmar) Hlaing Bwar	University	5

=== Clean sheets ===
As of 10 September 2023.

Rank	Player	Club	Clean sheets
1	(Myanmar) Naing Lin Oo	Thitsar Arman	9
2	(Myanmar) Soe Htut Kyaw	Glory Goal	3
2	(Myanmar) Thet Paing Oo	Golden Grit	3
2	(Myanmar) Min Myat Noe	Junior Lions	3
2	(Myanmar) Htoo Kyaw	Mawyawadi	3
2	(Myanmar) Kyaw Win Tun	Rakhapura United	3
3	(Myanmar) Ye Phyo Aung	Port	2
3	(Myanmar) Ex Doh Htoo	Port	2
3	(Myanmar) Saw Kyaw Khant Noe	University	2
4	(Myanmar) Sai Swam Koh Htay	Junior Lions	1
4	(Myanmar) Kyaw Kyaw Tun	Mawyawadi	1
4	(Myanmar) Van Lal Hruaia	Port	1
4	(Myanmar) Aung Aung	Shwe Pyi Thar	1
4	(Myanmar) Htet Aung Hlaing	Shwe Pyi Thar	1
4	(Myanmar) Thein Yan Naing	Shwe Pyi Thar	1
4	(Myanmar) Tin Ko Ko Tun	Shwe Pyi Thar	1
4	(Myanmar) Arkar Myint	Silver Stars	1
4	(Myanmar) Than Myat Soe	University	1
4	(Myanmar) Zar Ni Aung	University	1
4	(Myanmar) Min Khant Soe	University	1
