= Min Maw Oo =

Myanmar footballer (born 2005)

Personal information
- Full name: Min Maw Oo
- Date of birth: 6 May 2005 (age 21)
- Place of birth: Yangon, Myanmar
- Height: 1.66 m (5 ft 5 1/2 in)
- Position: Left winger

Team information
- Current team: Thitsar Arman
- Number: 7

Senior career*
Years	Team	Apps	(Gls)
2024-	Thitsar Arman	36	(12)

International career^{‡}
2024-2025	Myanmar U-20	11	(3)
2024-	Myanmar U-23	13	(2)
2024-	Myanmar	10	(0)
- * Club domestic league appearances and goals as of 28 July 2026 ‡ National team caps and goals as of 28 July 2026

Min Maw Oo (Burmese: မင်းမော်ဦး, 6 May 2005) is a Myanmar professional footballer who plays as a Winger for Myanmar National League club Thitsar Arman. A product of Yangon’s football scene, Min Maw Oo rose to prominence in the domestic league with his pace, dribbling ability, and eye for goal.

== Club career ==
=== Thitsar Arman ===
Min Maw Oo become a Main player of the Thitsar Arman during 2024-25 Myanmar National League season. He scored his first debut goal for Thitsar Arman against Myawady. In 2024-25 MNL season Week-20, Min Maw Oo received MOTM awards against Dagon Port 2-1 won and Thitsar Arman secured to still at MNL next season

Before start 2025 MNL League Cup, Yangon United and Shan United interested in him. Min Maw Oo got AYA Man of the Match against Shan United in 2025 MNL Cup group stage.

== Club statistics ==
Appearances and goals by club team and year
Club team	Year	Apps	Goals	Assists
Thitsar Arman	2024–2025	16	7	5
Thitsar Arman	2025–2026	20	5	6
Total		36	12	11

== International statistics ==
As of match played 19 July 2026

Age First Cap:

- (18 years)

Myanmar national team
Year	Apps	Goals	Assists
2024	1	0	0
2025	3	0	0
2026	6	0	0
Total	10	0	0

== International career ==
In 2024, he was called up for Myanmar national under-22 football team and chosen for 2025 SEA Games football team.

In 2024, he was called up by Myanmar for 2027 AFC Asian Cup qualification – third round in Saudi. His first debut for Myanmar is against Afghanistan and he was substituted in 68th minutes.
