= 2022 MNL-2 =

MNL-2
- Season: 2022
- Dates: 6 August 2022 - 13 November 2022
- Champions: University
- Runner up: Junior Lions
- Promoted: Dagon Star United, Kachin United
- Top goalscorer: (Myanmar) Phoe Chit (7 goals)

The 2022 National League 2, also known as the 2022 MPT Myanmar National League 2, is the tenth season of the MNL-2, the second division league for football clubs in Myanmar since its founding in 2012.

Season has total of seven teams. The league includes the MFF's youth teams. Silver Stars and Mawlamyine City will not be participating in the MNL-2 this season.

== Clubs ==
It is decided that the MNL-2 will be played with seven teams. The teams include Dagon Star United, Junior Lions, Young Boys, Kachin United, university, Yaw Myay, Mawyawadi and Kachin United. Due to financial issues and budget cuts, university will not be promoted to the 2023 Myanmar National League. Additionally, Junior Lions and Young Boys will also not be promoted regardless of their results, due to them being MFF based clubs. Instead, the four teams that does not have financial restraints or issues will be playing for promotion. The four teams are Dagon Star United, Yaw Myay, Mawyawadi and Kachin United. The top two teams in the end of season standings will be promoted to the 2023 Myanmar National League. No teams will be relegated unless a new MNL-3 has been scheduled, which is not confirmed.

=== Personnel and sponsoring ===
Note: Flags indicate national team as has been defined under FIFA eligibility rules. Players may hold more than one non-FIFA nationality.

Team	Head coach	Captain	Kit manufacturer	Shirt sponsor
Dagon Star United	(Myanmar) Nan Da Kyaw	(Myanmar) Chit Hla Aung	(Myanmar) Pro Sport	
Junior Lions	(Myanmar) U Min Min Tun	(Myanmar) Okkar Naing	(Thailand) Warrix	
Kachin United	(Myanmar) U Kyaw Thu Aung Myint Tun	(Myanmar) Mung Htoi Aung	(Myanmar) SCM	
Mawyawadi	(Myanmar) U Ko Ko Maung	(Myanmar) Kyaw Kyaw Tun	(Myanmar) SCM	(Myanmar) M.Life
University	(Myanmar) U Zaw Min	(Myanmar) Kaung Htet Naing	(Myanmar) M21	
Young Boys	(Myanmar) U Aung Zaw Myo	(Myanmar) Lin Htet Oo	(Thailand) Warrix	
Yaw Myay	(Myanmar) U Mya Lwin	(Myanmar) Aung Thu Win	(Myanmar) M21	

=== League table ===
Pos	Team	Pld	W	D	L	GF	GA	GD	Pts	Promotion
1	Junior Lions	10	7	1	2	24	8	+16	22	
2	University	10	6	3	1	21	6	+15	21	
3	Dagon Star United	10	5	5	0	15	8	+7	20	2023 Myanmar National League
4	Kachin United	10	3	3	4	15	15	0	12	2023 Myanmar National League
5	Mawyawadi FC	10	1	2	7	5	27	−22	5	
6	Young Boys	10	0	3	7	4	20	−16	3	

Source: National League 2

Top Soccer

| (Myanmar) Phone Chit. 7Goals

== Matches ==
Fixtures and Results of the 2022 MNL-2 season.

=== Week 1 ===
7/8/2022	Kachin United	2-2	Dagon Stars United	TG-1, Yangon
15:30 UTC+06:30	Zaw Moon Aung 31', 43'		Phoe Chit 71'; Aung Naing Oo 72'

22/8/2022	Junior Lions	7-0	Mawyawadi	TG-1, Yangon
15:30 UTC+06:30	Ye Kaung Sat 4'; Ye Yint Ze 15', 74'; Khant Zin Hein 32'; Aung Thiha 39'; Tun Tun Thein 44'; Zwe Mhan Thar 90+2'			Referee: U Aung Naing Win

27/8/2022	Yaw Myay	1-2	Young Boys	TG-1, Yangon
15:30 UTC+06:30	Pyae Phyo Wai 28'		Sai Myo Zaw 4'; Htoo Wai Yan 68'	Referee: U Zaw Khine

=== Week 2 ===
13/9/2022	Dagon Stars United	3-2	University	TG-1, Yangon
15:30 UTC+06:30				Referee: U Nyein Chan Aung

16/8/2022	Kachin United	0-4	Junior Lions	TG-1, Yangon
15:30 UTC+06:30			Swan Htet 41'; Thar Yar Win Htet 51'; Phyo Thet Ko Ko 66'; Aung Thiha 78'	Referee: U Zaw Zaw

18/9/2022	Young Boys	1-1	Mawyawadi
15:30 UTC+06:30	Shine Wunna Aung 3'		Myo Set Paing 72'	Referee: U Zaw Zaw

=== Week 3 ===
19/8/2022	Junior Lions	0-3	Dagon Stars United	TG-1, Yangon
15:30 UTC+06:30			Chit Hla AUng 45'; Aung Pyae Sone 75'; Aung Naing Oo 90'	Referee: U Myo Thiha

20/8/2022	University	2-0	Young Boys	TG-1, Yangon
15:30 UTC+06:30	Kaung Htet Naing 79'; Ye Min Oo 87'			Referee: U Thein Saw

15/8/2022	Mawyawadi	2-0	Yaw Myay	TG-1, Yangon
15:30 UTC+06:30	Win Nyunt 69'; Zayar Kyaw 73' (pen.)			Referee: U Thein Saw

=== Week 4 ===
23/8/2022	Kachin United	7-0	Yaw Myay	TG-1, Yangon
15:30 UTC+06:30	Zaw Moon Aung 22', 25', 49'; Sai Aung 65', 83'; S Gun Lum 78', 86'			Referee: U Tun Tun

25/8/2022	Mawyawadi	0-0	Dagon Stars	TG-1, Yangon
15:30 UTC+06:30				Referee: U Khin Maung Soe

26/8/2022	University	2-0	Junior Lions	TG-1, Yangon
15:30 UTC+06:30	Khaing Ye Win 7'; Swe Oo Hlaing 69'			Referee: U Phyo Htet Aung

=== Week 5 ===
29/8/2022	Kachin United	4-1	Mawyawadi	TG-1, Yangon
15:30 UTC+06:30	Zaw Moon Aung 35'; Sai Aung 4'; Nyi Nyi Tun 57'; S Gun Lum 74'		Aung Myat Min 45+1'	Referee: U Myo Thiha

1/9/2022	Yaw Myay	0-3	University	TG-1, Yangon
15:30 UTC+06:30			Myint Naing Thu 2'; Kaung Htet Naing 17'; Thein Htet Aung 90+1'	Referee: U Nyein Chan Aung

2/9/2022	Young Boys	0-1	Dagon Stars United	TG-1, Yangon
15:30 UTC+06:30			Phoe Chit 63'	Referee: U Soe Moe Hein

=== Week 6 ===
5/9/2022	University	5-0	Mawyawadi	TG-1, Yangon
15:30 UTC+06:30	Zin Min Htet 12'; Ye Min Oo 52'; Kaung Thet Naing 58' (pen.), 61'; Thein Htet Aung 74'

6/9/2022	Young Boys	1-1	Kachin United	TG-1, Yangon
15:30 UTC+06:30	Shine Wunna Aung 85'		Aung Thu Rein 74'

23/9/2022	Junior Lions	10-0	Yaw Myay	TG-1, Yangon
15:30 UTC+06:30	Oakkar Naing 17' (54); Tun Tun Thein 30'; Swan Htet 35' (52), 65'; Yan Myint Ze 73'; Aung Thiha 85'; Phyo Thant Ko Ko 84' (90)

=== Week 7 ===
14/9/2022	University	0-0	Kachin United	TG-1, Yangon
15:30 UTC+06:30

14/9/2022	Dagon Stars	5-0	Yaw Myay	TG-1, Yangon
15:30 UTC+06:30	Phoe Chit 19', 45'; Myat Thu 63' (o.g); That Paing Soe 70', 88'

=== Week 8 ===
28/9/2022	Dagon Star United	1-0	Mawyawadi	TG-1, Yangon
15:30 UTC+06:30	Aung Naing Oo 86'

29/9/2022	Yaw Myay	0-6	Kachin United	TG-1, Yangon
15:30 UTC+06:30			Zaw Moon Aung 12', 45' ,Nyi Nyi 33', Than Zaw Hein 53' , Elysee 73', 80'

30/9/2022	Junior Lions	0-0	University	TG-1, Yangon
15:30 UTC+06:30

=== Week 9 ===
3/10/2022	Junior Lions	2-1	Kachin United	TG-1, Yangon
15:30 UTC+06:30	Ye Kaung Sat 40 (pen)' , Swan Htet 71'		Than Zaw Hein 60'

4/10/2022	University	1-1	Dagon Star United	TG-1, Yangon
15:30 UTC+06:30	Kaung Khant Kyaw 5'		Phoe Chit 47 (pen)'

16/10/2022	Mawyawadi	2-1	Young Boys	TG-1, Yangon
15:30 UTC+06:30	Myo Set Paing 10 (pen)' , Aung Myat Min 13'		Nay Lin Tun 90+3'

=== Week 10 ===
7/10/2022	Kachin United	2-3	University	TG-1, Yangon
15:30 UTC+06:30	Aung Thu Rein 87 (pen)' , S.Gum Ting 90+1'		Kaung Khant Kyaw 4', 24' , Myint Naing Thu 80'

8/10/2022	Yaw Myay	0-3	Dagon Star United	TG-1, Yangon
15:30 UTC+06:30			Aung Naing Oo 14' , Phoe Chit 74', 85'

13/10/2022	Junior Lions	3-0	Young Boys	TG-1, Yangon
15:30 UTC+06:30	Ye Kaung Set 9' , Oakkar Naing 35', Aung Thiha 60'

=== Week 11 ===
11/10/2022	Mawyawadi	0-3	Kachin United	TG-1, Yangon
15:30 UTC+06:30			Than Zaw Hein 10' , Nyi Nyi 20', Sai Aung 63'

12/10/2022	University	3-2	Yaw Myay	TG-1, Yangon
15:30 UTC+06:30	Nay Thuar Aung 41' , Aung Min Thant 45+1(OG)',Khaing Ye Win 55 (pen)'		Chit Htwe 32', 90+3'

19/10/2022	Dagon Star United	1-1	Young Boys	TG-1, Yangon
15:30 UTC+06:30	Phoe Chit 38'		Lin Htet Soe 56 (pen)'

=== Week 12 ===
20/10/2022	Yaw Myay	0-3	Junior Lions	TG-1, Yangon
15:30 UTC+06:30			Oakkar Naing 16' (34); Swan Htet 50'

21/10/2022	Mawyawadi	0-1	University	TG-1, Yangon
15:30 UTC+06:30			Thein Htet Aung 88'

22/10/2022	Kachin United	1-0	Young Boys	TG-1, Yangon
15:30 UTC+06:30	Zaw Shan 86'
