= Pathein Stadium =

Multi-purpose statium in Pathein, Myanmar

Coordinates: 16°47′07.4″N 94°44′02.3″E

- Pathein Stadium
- Interactive map of Pathein Stadium
- Full name: Pathein Stadium
- Location: Pathein, Burma
- Capacity: 6,000

Tenant
- Ayeyawady United

Pathein Stadium is a multi-use stadium in Pathein, Burma. It is currently used mostly for football matches and is the home ground of Ayeyawady United of the Myanmar National League. The stadium holds 6,000 spectators.
