= 2024 MNL-2 =

MNL-2
- Season: 2024
- Dates: 23 July 2024 – 27 November 2024
- Champions: Chinland
- Runner up: University
- Promoted: Chinland & Yarmanya United
- Relegated: Shwe Pyi Thar & Ayeyarwady Rangers
- Matches: 112
- Goals: 226 (2.02 per match)
- Top goalscorer: Zaw Zaw Hteik (18 goals)

The 2024 Myanmar National League Two, is the 12th season of the MNL-2, the second division league for association football clubs since its founding in 2012.

It has been decided to hold the MNL2 league with a total of eight teams.

== Clubs ==
In 2024 MNL-2, Kachin United, GFA, Glory Goal, Shwe Pyi Thar United, Silver Stars, University, and Ramanya United and Ayeyarwady Ranger which two club are MNL-2 Promotion Amateur Club Tournament 2023 final.

=== Personnel and sponsoring ===
Note: Flags indicate national team as has been defined under FIFA eligibility rules. Players may hold more than one non-FIFA nationality.

Team	Head coach	Captain	Kit manufacturer	Shirt sponsor
Glory Goal	(Myanmar) U Thar Kyaw	(Myanmar) Lin Latt Htwe	(Myanmar) The Art of Sports	(Myanmar)
Ayeyarwady Ranger	(Myanmar) U Mya Lwin	(Myanmar) Shwe Win Tun	(Myanmar) SCM	
University	(Myanmar) U Zaw Min	(Myanmar) Than Myat Soe	(Myanmar) Rhino Sport	
Yamanya United	(Myanmar) U Myat Tun	(Myanmar) San Myint Naing	(Myanmar) Ayeyawady Sports	(Myanmar)
Chinland	(Myanmar) U Ka Siang Cung Lian	(Myanmar) Tint AUng Kyaw	(Myanmar) X-one	(Myanmar) LPSW
Shwe Pyi Thar United	(Myanmar) U Aung Min Oo	(Cameroon) Mandjombe	(Myanmar)	
Silver Stars	(Myanmar) U SHwe Tun	(Myanmar) Thet Lwin Soe	(Myanmar) Rhino Sport	
Kachin United	(Myanmar) U Soe Thein	(Myanmar) S Gum Lum	(Myanmar) Ronin Sport	(Myanmar) Ronin Sport

== League table ==
Pos	Team	Pld	W	D	L	GF	GA	GD	Pts	Promotion or relegation
1	Chinland F.C. (C, P)	14	10	2	2	31	15	+16	32	2025-2026 Myanmar National League
2	University	14	9	3	2	39	17	+22	30	
3	Yarmanya United F.C. (P)	14	9	3	2	37	16	+21	30	2025-2026 Myanmar National League
4	Kachin Utd	14	9	1	4	37	14	+23	28	
5	Glory Goal	14	5	3	6	21	20	+1	18	
6	Silver Stars	14	2	2	10	18	39	−21	8	
7	Shwe Pyi Thar	14	2	1	11	23	47	−24	7	
8	Ayeyawady Rangers	14	2	1	11	20	58	−38	7	

(C) Champions; (P) Promoted

- Although University got the 1st runner-up in 2024, they did not pass the MNL professional criteria. Then, Yarmanya United will promoted to 2025-26 MNL.
