= 2013 MNL-2 =

MNL-2
- Season: 2013
- Champions: Chin United
- Matches: 36

The 2013 MNL-2 New Holland League is the inaugural MNL-2 season which began on 15 February and ended on 28 June. On 28 June 2013, Chin United defeated GFA FC to become the first ever MNL-2 Champions.

== To MNL-2 ==
Promoted from Amateur League

- Myawady FC

Relegated from MNL

- Chin United FC
- Mawyawadi FC

== From MNL-2 ==
Promoted to MNL

- Chin United
- GFA FC

Relegation

- It is understood that MFF is in the process of establishing a third-tier league, MNL-3 in coming years. Until then no team will be relegated.

== Teams ==
The 2013 MNL-2 season will have 9 teams playing for promotion to the Myanmar National League. The teams are:-

- Best United FC
- Horizon FC
- Mawyawadi FC
- Chin United
- Myawady FC
- GFA FC
- Myanmar U-19 (guest team)
- Dagon FC
- Michelia FC

== Stadium ==
Matches are planned to play in Bogyoke Aung San Stadium and Padonmar Stadium with a League cup format.

== League table ==
Pos	Team	Pld	W	D	L	GF	GA	GD	Pts	Promotion
1	Chin United FC	16	10	4	2	34	12	+22	34	Promotion to 2014 Myanmar National League
2	GFA FC	16	9	4	3	25	15	+10	31	Promotion to 2014 Myanmar National League
3	Myanmar U-19	16	8	5	3	31	19	+12	29	
4	Myawady FC	16	8	4	4	27	18	+9	28	
5	Best United FC	16	7	4	5	26	17	+9	25	
6	Mawyawadi FC	16	7	2	7	20	24	−4	23	
7	Dagon FC	16	3	3	10	26	34	−8	12	
8	Horizon FC	16	2	4	10	18	38	−20	10	
9	Michelia FC	16	1	4	11	17	48	−31	7	

Rules for classification: 1) points; 2) goal difference; 3) number of goals scored.

== See also ==
- 2013 Myanmar National League
- 2013 MFF Cup
