= Myanmar University F.C. =

Myanmar University တက္ကသိုလ်များ ဘောလုံးအသင်း
- Full name: Myanmar University Football Club
- Founded: 2009; 17 years ago
- Ground: University Stadium
- Capacity: 4,000
- Manager: U Zaw Min
- League: MNL-2
- 2025-26: MNL-2, 3rd
- Website: https://www.uy.edu.mm/

University Football Club (Burmese: တက္ကသိုလ်များ ဘောလုံးအသင်း) is a Burmese professional football club founded in 2009. The players are mostly students from Universities of Myanmar.

== Stadium ==
University uses the University Stadium, located on Thaton Road in Kamayut Township, as its home ground. It is one of the few teams in M League 2 to use its own stadium as its home venue.

== 2026-27 squad ==
Note: Flags indicate national team as defined under FIFA eligibility rules; some limited exceptions apply. Players may hold more than one non-FIFA nationality.

No.	Pos.	Nation	Player
1	GK	MYA	Min Khant Soe
2	DF	MYA	Myint Myat Maung
3	DF	MYA	Sut Hting Naw
4	DF	MYA	Htet Wai Yan
5	DF	MYA	Nay Naing Oo
6	MF	MYA	Khi Yaw Sar
7	FW	MYA	Shine Htet Aung (2)
8	FW	MYA	Shine Htet Aung (1)
9	FW	MYA	Myu Dan Hkung

No.	Pos.	Nation	Player
10	FW	MYA	Ye Yint Maung
11	FW	MYA	Seng Myo Latt
12	FW	MYA	Saw Phyo Ko Lin Zaw
16	MF	MYA	Than Htet Moe
17	MF	MYA	Arkar Moe
19	FW	MYA	Saw Sia Wah Po
20	FW	MYA	Theikddi
23	MF	MYA	Win Win Htun
24	FW	MYA	San Pyae Sone Soe (Captain)
25	GK	MYA	Wai Thet Soe
26	FW	MYA	Phyo Thant Ko Ko

== Honours ==
=== Domestic ===
- MNL-2
  - Champions (1): 2022
  - Runners-up (2): 2023, 2024
- General Aung San Shield
  - Champions (1): 1961
- BAA Senior First Division
  - Champions (8): 1915, 1916, 1917, 1919, 1920, 1932, 1933, 1934
- Rangoon Amateur Football Association League
  - Champions (1): 1963
- Myanmar First Division(Tier-2)
  - Champions (1): 1995-96
- Rangoon Senior Second Division
  - Champions (3): 1952, 1954-55, 1958
