= Salin Stadium =

Sports stadium in Yangon, Myanmar

- Interactive map of Salin Stadium
- Location: Kamayut, Yangon, Myanmar
- Coordinates: 16°48′45.73″N 96°7′30.58″E
- Owner: Ministry of Sport
- Capacity: 8,000
- Surface: Grass

Salin Stadium (Burmese: စလင်း အားကစားကွင်း is a multi-use stadium, located in Yangon, Myanmar. The 3,000-seat stadium is smaller but more up-to-date than Aung San Stadium, and is the venue of choice for most national and international level football and track and field competitions.
