= M League 2 =

- Organising body: MFF
- Founded: 28 February 2013; 13 years ago
- Country: Myanmar
- Confederation: AFC
- Number of clubs: 10
- Level on pyramid: 2
- Promotion to: M League
- Relegation to: M League Amature
- Domestic cup: M League Cup
- Current champions: Chinland (2025-26)
- Most championships: Chinland (3 titles)
- Website: MNL; MFF
- Current: 2026-27

The M League 2, also known as the M League II, is the second-tier football league of Myanmar. The inaugural season began in 2013.

== History ==
The MNL-2 was founded in 2013 as part of MFF's effort to extend competitiveness into the nation's football system. The league is played in a league cup format. After two rounds of competition, the top two teams compete each other for the final. The two finalists are promoted to the MNL. The top four finishers from the league also qualify for the MFF Cup. For the inaugural season in 2013, nine teams participated. Mawyawadi FC and Chin United were relegated from the MNL at the end of the 2012 season, while Myawady FC were promoted from the Amateur League. The 2015 MNL-2 winner was Southern Myanmar and 1st runner-up was Horizon FC. In the 2016 MNL-2 season, four new clubs were included. Three clubs will qualify to the MNL-2. In the 2018 MNL-2 season, Mountain Lion included in competition. In the 2023 MNL-2, Thitsar Arman become the title winner for the first time in their history.

In 2026, the MFF rebranding the MNL to M League and MNL-2 to M League 2.

== Champions ==
#	Season	Champions	Runners-up
1	2013	Chin United	GFA
2	2014	Hantharwady United	Rakhine United
3	2015	Southern Myanmar FC	Horizon FC
4	2016	Manaw Myay	GFA
5	2017	City Yangon	Mahar United
6	2018	Royal Thanlyin	Dagon
7	2019	Chin United	ISPE
8	2020	Chinland	Myawady FC
9	2022	University	Junior Lions
10	2023	Thitsar Arman	University
11	2024	Chinland F.C.	University
12	2025–26	Chinland	Myawady FC

== Wins by club ==
Club	Champions	Runners-up	Winning seasons	Runners-up seasons
Chinland	3	1	2020, 2024, 2025-26	2013
Chin United	2	0	2013, 2019	
University	1	2	2022	2023, 2024
City Yangon	1	1	2017	2015
Myawady	0	2		2020, 2025-26

== M League 2 clubs ==
Team	Head coach	Captain	Kit manufacturer	Shirt sponsor
Asian Lions	(Myanmar)	(Myanmar)	(Myanmar)	
Elite Kings	(Myanmar)	(Myanmar)	(Myanmar)	
Royal Dagon	(Myanmar) U Myat Tun	(Myanmar) Zar Chi Maung	(Myanmar) Rhino Sports	(Myanmar) Glory Goal Construction
Yarmanya United	(Myanmar)	(Myanmar)	(Myanmar)	
Manaw FC	(Myanmar) U Soe Thein	(Myanmar) Ye Yint Aung	(Myanmar) Ronin Sport	(Myanmar) Ronin Sport
Rakhine United **	(Myanmar) U Min Tun Lin	(Myanmar) Zaw Zaw Naing	(Myanmar) Glory	
University	(Myanmar) U Zaw Min	(Myanmar) Aung Myint Myat	(Myanmar) Fit	
Enjoy Brother	(Myanmar) U Aung Naing	(Myanmar) Sithu Aung	(Myanmar) M21 Sport	
VUE Nay Pyi Taw	(Myanmar)	(Myanmar)	(Myanmar)	

  - Relegation from Myanmar National League
- (1) - (MNL-2 Promotion Amateur Club Tournament 2025 champion)
- (2) - (MNL-2 Promotion Amateur Club Tournament 2025 runners-up)

== Prize money ==
- Champion: Ks. 13,000,000
- Runner-up: Ks. 10,000,000
- Third place: Ks. 7,000,000

== Awards ==
=== Top scorers ===
Season	Top scorer	Club	Goals
2017	(Uganda) Joseph Mpande	City Yangon	30
2018	(Nigeria) Sullivan Taylor	Royal Thanlyin	14
2019	(Nigeria) Sullivan Taylor	Chin United	17
2022	(Myanmar) Phoe Chit	Dagon Star United	7
2023	(Myanmar) Thant Zaw Hein	Thitsar Arman	20
2023	(Myanmar) Zaw Zaw Htike	University	20
2024	(Myanmar) Zaw Zaw Htike	University	18
2025-26	(Myanmar) Hla Phone Oo	Chinland	22
