= Padonmar Stadium =

Sports stadium in Yangon, Myanmar

- Interactive map of Padonmar Stadium
- Location: Sanchaung, Yangon, Myanmar
- Coordinates: 16°48′10.72″N 96°08′06.50″E
- Owner: Ministry of Sport
- Capacity: 3000
- Surface: Grass

Padonmar Stadium (Burmese: ပဒုမ္မာဘောလုံးကွင်း is a multi-use stadium, located in Yangon, Myanmar. The 3,000-seat stadium is smaller but more up-to-date than Aung San Stadium, and is the venue of choice for most national and international level football and track and field competitions.
