= 2017 MNL-2 =

MNL-2
- Season: 2017
- Champions: City Yangon F.C.
- Runner up: Mahar United F.C.
- Promoted: Myawady F.C. Mahar United F.C.
- Matches: 95
- Goals: 314 (3.31 per match)
- Top goalscorer: (Uganda) Joseph Mpande (30 goals)
- Biggest home win: City Stars F.C. 7 - 1 Silver Stars FC (20 June 2017)
- Biggest away win: Mawyawadi FC 0 - 6 City Yangon F.C. (31 January 2017)
- Highest scoring: City Stars F.C. 7 - 1 Silver Stars FC (20 June 2017)

The MNL-2 2017 is the MNL-2's fifth full regular season.

== Name Change ==
Horizon FC name changed to City Yangon.

=== Personnel and sponsoring ===
Note: Flags indicate national team as has been defined under FIFA eligibility rules. Players may hold more than one non-FIFA nationality.

Team	Head coach	Captain	Kit manufacturer	Shirt sponsor
City Yangon	(Myanmar) U Chit Naing	(Myanmar) Aung Ko Ko Win	(Thailand) Warrix Sports	
City Stars	(Myanmar) U Mya Myint Htwe	(Myanmar) Tin Win Myint	(Thailand) Pro Sport	
Dagon FC	(Myanmar) U Shwe Tin	(Myanmar) Kyaw Khine Oo	(United States) Nike	
Mahar United	(Myanmar) U Zaw Lin Tun 2	(Myanmar) Aung Hlang Win	(Thailand) FBT	(Myanmar)
Mawyawadi	(Myanmar) U Than Aye	(Myanmar) Kyaw Swar Min		(Myanmar) Starcam
Myanmar University	(Myanmar) U Zaw Win	(Myanmar) Nay Myo Htwe	(Thailand) Pro Sport	(Myanmar) Wai Gem & Jewelary
Myawady	(Myanmar) U San Maung	(Myanmar) Ye Wai Yan Soe	(Thailand) Pro Sport	(Myanmar)
Pong Gan	(Myanmar) U Aung Khin	(Myanmar) Nyein Chan Aung	(Thailand) Pro Sport	(Myanmar)
Silver Stars	(Myanmar) U Khin Maung Htwe	(Myanmar) Kyaw Phyo Oo	(Thailand) Pro Sport	(Myanmar)
Team Phoenix	(Myanmar) U Nyi Nyi Latt	(Myanmar) Pyae Sone Naig	(Thailand) Kronos	(Myanmar) AMI Insurance
United of Thanlyin	(Myanmar) U Win Myint	(Myanmar) Wai Lu	made by club	(Myanmar)

=== Foreign players ===
The number of foreign players is restricted to four per MNL-2 club. A team can use three foreign players on the field in each game, including a slot for a player from among AFC countries.

Club	Player 1	Player 2	Player 3	AFC player
City Yangon	(Uganda) Joseph Mpande	(Uganda) Isa Lumu	(Ghana) Ernest Kwame Ofori	
City Stars	(Cameroon) Elysee Ngang Anla'A	(Ghana) Awodja Godwin Kobla	(Ghana) Mensah Stephen	
Dagon				
Mahar United	(Nigeria) Barnas Friday	(Nigeria) Maduabuckkwu Samuel	(Eritrea) Kelvin Koudas	
Mawyawadi	(Eritrea) Taylor Leon Sullivan	(Nigeria) Adofu Monday	(Nigeria) Samuel Kojo Abbey	
Myanmar University				
Myawady				
Pong Gan				
Silver Stars	(Nigeria) Mayowa Joseph Olaniran	(Ghana) Jonatha Ousu Carr	(Nigeria) Gar Gar Adolphus Taye Boy	
Phoenix				
United of Thanlyin	(Nigeria) Udeagha Odinaka Hyginus	(Nigeria) Nku Nicolas Osang	(Nigeria) Clint	

== Result ==
=== League table ===
Below is the league table for 2017 season.

Pos	Team	Pld	W	D	L	GF	GA	GD	Pts	Promotion
1	City Yangon F.C.	18	16	2	0	60	12	+48	50	2018 Myanmar National league
2	Mahar United F.C.	18	13	3	2	52	18	+34	42	2018 Myanmar National league
3	Myawady FC	18	11	2	5	40	17	+23	35	
4	Team Phoenix F.C.	18	9	2	7	33	22	+11	29	
5	Mawyawadi FC	18	7	3	8	29	37	−8	24	
6	City Stars F.C.	18	7	2	9	30	31	−1	23	
7	Myanmar University F.C.	18	7	2	9	24	38	−14	23	
8	Dagon FC	18	5	3	10	20	27	−7	18	
9	Pong Gan FC	18	5	2	11	14	31	−17	17	
10	Silver Stars FC	18	2	1	15	8	60	−52	7	
11	United of Thanlyin F.C. (B)	10	2	0	8	4	21	−17	6	

(B) Banned from MNL-2 due to finance problem.

== Matches ==
Fixtures and Results of the Myanmar National League 2017 season.

=== Week 1 ===
17 January 2017	Mawyawadi	0 - 2	Pong Gan	Aung San Stadium, Yangon
16:00 UTC+06:30			Soe Myat Thu 29'; Naing Naing Lin 64'

17 January 2016	University	2 - 0	Silver Star	Padonmar Stadium
16:00 UTC+06:30	Aung Thant Zaw 13'; Khaing Ye Win 60'

18 January 2017	Myawady	2 - 1	Dagon	Aung San Stadium
16:00 UTC+06:30	Ye Wai Yan Soe 7'; Aung Phyo 90+3'		Nyunt Win 73'

19 January 2017	City Yangon	3 - 0	Mahar United	Thuwunna Stadium
15:30 UTC+06:30	Nyein Soe 5'; Thiha 11', 56'

20 January 2017	City Star	3 - 1	United of Thanlyin	Thuwunna Stadium
16:00 UTC+06:30	Clint 40'		Luat Lat Maung 75'; Awodji Godwin Kobla 85'; Elysee Ngang Anla'A 86'

=== Week 2 ===
24 January 2017	United of Thanlyin	0 - 1	Mawyawadi	Padonmar Stadium, Yangon
16:00 UTC+06:30			Samuel 90+1'

24 January 2016	Pong Gan	0 - 4	Myawady	Thuwunna Stadium
16:00 UTC+06:30			Kaung Si Thu 6', 32', 73'; Thet Paing Ko 49'

24 January 2017	Dagon	1 - 3	Mahar United	Aung San Stadium
16:00 UTC+06:30	Zaw Soe 30'		Wai Phyo Thu 25'; Aung Hlaing Win 31'; Ejimadu Chima Agbabus 90+3'

25 January 2017	Phoenix	5 - 0	University	Thuwunna Stadium
15:30 UTC+06:30	Pyae Sone Naing 6', pen' Hein Htet Aung 28'; Win Naing Tun 32', 38', 47'

25 January 2017	Silver Star	0 - 4	City Star	Thuwunna Stadium
16:00 UTC+06:30			Khant Ko Ko Soe 21'; Elysee Ngang Anla'A 25'; Zeyar Phyo Kyaw 30'; Ye Wint Kyaw 90+4'

=== Week 3 ===
31 January 2017	Mawyawadi	0 - 6	City Yangon	Aung San Stadium, Yangon
16:00 UTC+06:30			Josepth 7', 17', 35', 84'; Ernest 13'; Thiha 75'

31 January 2016	Mahar United	2 - 1	University	Thuwunna Stadium
16:00 UTC+06:30	Aung Hlaing Win 35'; Aung Phyo Lin 38'		Arkar Moe 47'

24 January 2017	Myawady	2 - 1	City Stars	Aung San Stadium
16:00 UTC+06:30	Thet Paing Ko 40'; Kaung Si Thu 62'		Luat Lat Maung 12'

1 February 2017	United of thanlyin	1 - 0	Silver Stars	Thuwunna Stadium
15:30 UTC+06:30	Soe Min Tun 93'

1 February 2017	Pong Gan	2 - 1	Phoenix	Aung San Stadium
16:00 UTC+06:30	Soe Myat Thu 38'; Aung Khing Tun 40'		Win Naing Tun 86'

=== Week 4 ===
7 February 2017	University	1 - 1	Myawady	Aung San Stadium, Yangon
16:00 UTC+06:30	Nyan Lin Aung 79'		Kaung Si Thu 53'

7 February 2016	City Stars	1 - 3	Mawyawadi	Thuwunna Stadium
16:00 UTC+06:30	Khant Ko Ko Soe 17'		Samuel 33', 93'; Kyaw Swar Min 45'

8 February 2017	Silver Stars	0 - 2	Pong Gan	Aung San Stadium
16:00 UTC+06:30			Hpung Seng 12', 73'

8 February 2017	United of thanlyin	0 - 1	City Yangon	Padonmar Stadium
15:30 UTC+06:30			Isa Lumu 46'

8 February 2017	Team Phoenix	2 - 0	Dagon	Thuwunna Stadium
16:00 UTC+06:30	Win Naing Tun 39'; Lwin Moe Aung 68'

=== Week 5 ===
13 February 2017	University	1 - 0	Pong Gan	Thuwunna Stadium, Yangon
16:00 UTC+06:30	Arkar Moe 90'

14 February 2016	Team Phoenix	1 - 2	Silver Stars	Aung San Stadium
16:00 UTC+06:30

14 February 2017	Mawyawadi	1 - 1	Mahar United	Thuwunna Stadium
16:00 UTC+06:30	Chukwuemeka 40'		Aung Hlaing Win 15'

15 February 2017	City Stars	1 - 0	Dagon	Aung San Stadium
15:30 UTC+06:30	Ngang 71'

15 February 2017	City Yangon	1 - 1	Myawady	Thuwunna Stadium
16:00 UTC+06:30	Joseph 49'		Ye Wai Yan Soe 12'

=== Week 6 ===
21 February 2017	Mahar United	2 - 0	Silver Stars	Aung San Stadium, Yangon
16:00 UTC+06:30	Aung Phyo Lin 18'; Thiha Thu 76'

21 February 2016	Myawady	0 - 1	Phoenix	Thuwunna Stadium
16:00 UTC+06:30			Pyae Sone Naing 46'

22 February 2017	City Yangon	1 - 0	Pong gan	Aung San Stadium
16:00 UTC+06:30	Joseph 71'

22 February 2017	Dagon	2 - 0	United of Thanlyin	Thuwunna Stadium
15:30 UTC+06:30	Sai Nay 3'; Nyunt Win 80'

22 February 2017	City Stars	1 - 2	University	Padonmar Stadium
16:00 UTC+06:30	Zin Myo Naing 40'		Nay Myo Htwe 68', 86'

=== Week 7 ===
28 February 2017	Mahar United	1 - 1	Phoenix	Aung San Stadium, Yangon
16:00 UTC+06:30	Friday 55'		Pyae Sone Naing 51'

28 February 2016	Dagon	0 - 0	Silver Stars	Thuwunna Stadium
16:00 UTC+06:30

1 March 2017	Pong Gan	0 - 1	United of Thanlyin	Aung San Stadium
16:00 UTC+06:30			Kyaw Min Than 81'

1 March 2017	City Stars	0 - 1	City Yangon	Thuwunna Stadium
15:30 UTC+06:30			Thiha 38'

1 March 2017	Mawyawadi	1 - 0	University	Padonmar Stadium
16:00 UTC+06:30	Pyae Sone Aung 22'

=== Week 8 ===
7 March 2017	Pong Gan	2 - 0	City Stars	Aung San Stadium, Yangon
16:00 UTC+06:30	Tun Lin Lin 3'; Hpung Seng 73'

8 March 2017	Mahar United	0 - 2	Myawady	Thuwunna Stadium
16:00 UTC+06:30			Myo Min Htut 59'; Thet Paing Ko 77'

8 March 2017	City Yangon	3 - 2	Phoenix	Padonmar Stadium
15:30 UTC+06:30	Thiha 2'; Joseph 74', 77'		Win Naing Tun 40'; Aung Moe Htwe 89'

8 March 2017	United of Thanlyin	1 - 5	University	Aung San Stadium
16:00 UTC+06:30	Zin Myo Aung 45+2'		Aung Thant Zaw 8', 66'; Kaung Htet San 17'; Arker Moe 79'; Thant Zayar Win 83'

9 March 2016	Dagon	2 - 3	Mawyawadi	Thuwunna Stadium
16:00 UTC+06:30	Zaw Zin Oo 35', 42'		C.M. Samule 48', 88', 90+2'

=== Week 9 ===
14 March 2017	Silver Stars	0 - 6	Myawady	Aung San Stadium, Yangon
16:00 UTC+06:30			Kaung Si Thu 4', 57'; Ye Wai Yan Soe 17', 21', 79', 85'

14 March 2017	United of Thanlyin	0 - 3	Mahar United	Thuwunna Stadium
16:00 UTC+06:30			Toe Sat Naing 9'; Barnet Friday 30'; Than Hteik Aung 51'

15 March 2017	City Yangon	7 - 0	University	Thuwunna Stadium
15:30 UTC+06:30	Chan Oo 54', 65', 79', 88'; Joseph Mpande 62', 72', 77'

15 March 2017	Phoenix	2 - 1	Mawyawadi	Padonmar Stadium
16:00 UTC+06:30	Win Naing Tun 4'; Pyae Sone Naing 65'		Samuel 21'

16 March 2016	Pong Gan	0 - 0	Dagon	Thuwunna Stadium
16:00 UTC+06:30

=== Week 10 ===
21 March 2017	Silver Stars	v	Mawyawadi	Thuwunna Stadium, Yangon
16:00 UTC+06:30

22 March 2017	Phoenix	2 - 0	City Stars	Thuwunna Stadium
16:00 UTC+06:30	Win Naing Tun 34', 79'

22 March 2017	Dagon	1 - 3	City Yangon	Aung San Stadium
15:30 UTC+06:30	Zaw Zin Oo 90+2'		Aung Phyo Phyo 43'; Aung Ko Ko Win 45'; Joseph 47'

23 March 2017	Pong gan	1 - 3	Mahar United	Aung San Stadium
16:00 UTC+06:30	Hpung Seng 90+2'		Toe Sat Naing 55' (66); Friday 77'

23 March 2016	United of Thanlyin	0 - 3	Myawady	Thuwunna Stadium
16:00 UTC+06:30

=== Week 11 ===
3 April 2017	University	1 - 2	Dagon	Aung San Stadium, Yangon
16:00 UTC+06:30	Arkar Moe 18'		Zaw Zin Oo 21'; Ye Thiha 32'

28 March 2017	City Stars	0 - 3	Mahar United	Thuwunna Stadium
16:00 UTC+06:30			Toe Sat Naing 21'; Barnas Friday 41', 45'

29 March 2017	Mawyawadi	0 - 3	Myawady	Aung San Stadium
16:00 UTC+06:30			Kaung Si Thu 18'; Ye Wai Yan Soe 42'; Thet Paing Ko 90+2'

30 March 2017	Silver Stars	1 - 5	City Yangon	Thuwunna Stadium
16:00 UTC+06:30	Silver Stars 82'		Josepth 14', 36', 53', 69'; Aung Ko Ko Win 48'

30 March 2016	Phoenix	3 - 0	United of Thanlyin	Aung San Stadium
16:00 UTC+06:30

=== Week 12 ===
23 May 2017	Phoenix	0 - 1	City Yangon	Aung San Stadium, Yangon
16:00 UTC+06:30			Myo Min Zaw 83'

23 May 2017	Silver Stars	0 - 8	Mahar United	Thuwunna Stadium
16:00 UTC+06:30			Toe Sat Naing 12', 33', 64'; Thiha Thu 44', 68', 88'; Samuel 53'; Friday 84'

24 May 2017	Myawady	2 - 0	Pong Gan	Aung San Stadium
16:00 UTC+06:30	Aung Thu 60'; Ye Wai Yan Soe 82'

24 May 2017	City Stars	3 - 2	University	Thuwunna Stadium
16:00 UTC+06:30	Sai Zi Mon 11'; Naing Ko Lin 26'; Zayar Phyo Kyaw 32'		Arkar Moe 21'; Nay Lin Aung 73' (pen.)

24 May 2016	Mawyawadi	3 - 1	Dagon	Padonmar Stadium
16:00 UTC+06:30	Adofu Monday 24', 82'; Taylor 87'		Pyae Phyo Thu 81'

=== Week 13 ===
30 May 2017	Mawyawadi	1 - 1	City Stars	Aung San Stadium, Yangon
16:00 UTC+06:30

30 May 2017	Phoenix	6 - 1	Pong gan	Thuwunna Stadium
16:00 UTC+06:30	Win Naing Tun 12', 45+2', 90'; Htet Phyo Wai 23'; Lwin Moe Aung 57', 81'		Khan Kyint Man 6'

31 May 2017	Dagon	1 - 2	Mahar United	Aung San Stadium
16:00 UTC+06:30	Zaw Soe 18'		Kelvin 48'; Samuel 50'

31 May 2017	Myawady	0 - 1	University	Thuwunna Stadium
16:00 UTC+06:30			Aung Thant Zaw 90+1'

31 May 2016	City Yangon	5 - 0	Silver Stars	Padonmar Stadium
16:00 UTC+06:30	Joseph 5', 52', 92'; Myo Min Zaw 63' Win Htet Aung 63'

=== Week 14 ===
6 June 2017	Myawady	3 - 2	Mawyawadi	Padonmar Stadium, Yangon
16:00 UTC+06:30	Aung Myo Kyaw 20'; Ye Wai Yan Soe 49'; Phyo Min Hteik 86' (pen.)		Taylor 36' (pen.), 45+1'

6 June 2017	Mahar United	3 - 3	City Stars	Sa Lin Stadium
16:00 UTC+06:30	Wai Phyo Thu 18'; Barnas Friday 39'; Samuel 41'		Zayar Phyo Kyaw 51'; Elysee Ngang 59'; Zin Myo Naing 89'

7 June 2017	Pong Gan	0 - 3	City Yangon	Salin Stadium
16:00 UTC+06:30			Joseph 20', 67', 86'

7 June 2017	Silver Stars	1 - 2	Dagon	Padonmar Stadium
16:00 UTC+06:30	Gar Gar 24'		Zaw Soe 13'; Naing Naing Lin 42'

8 June 2016	University	0 - 0	Phoenix	Padonmar Stadium
16:00 UTC+06:30

=== Week 15 ===
13 June 2017	University	0 - 6	Mahar United	Aung San Stadium, Yangon
16:00 UTC+06:30			Samuel 19', 34', 40'; Kyaw Swar Min 38', 80'; Thiha Soe Htet 62'

13 June 2017	Dagon	2 - 3	Phoenix	Thuwunna Stadium
16:00 UTC+06:30	Chit Soe Paing 84'; Nyut Win 90'		Win Naig Tun 3', 34'; Pyae Sone Naing 56'

14 June 2017	City Yangon	6 - 2	Mawyawadi	Salin Stadium
16:00 UTC+06:30	Ernest 14'; Joseph 17'; Lumu 29'; Moe Htet Aung 42', 78', 86'		Zayar Kyaw 24'; Zin Min Thant 90+2'

14 June 2017	City Stars	1 - 4	Myawady	Thuwunna Stadium
16:00 UTC+06:30	El See 48'		Kaung Sithu 5', 50', 70'; Ye Wai Yan Soe 79'

15 June 2016	Pong Gan	2 - 0	Silver Stars	Thuwunna Stadium
16:00 UTC+06:30	Hpung Seng 14'; Thu Rain Win 36'

=== Week 16 ===
20 June 2017	Mawyawadi	3 - 1	Phoenix	Thuwunna Stadium, Yangon
16:00 UTC+06:30	Taylor 23'; Monday 48', 90+1'		Pyae Sone Naing 30'

20 June 2017	City Stars	7 - 1	Silver Stars	Thuwunna Stadium
16:00 UTC+06:30	Sai Zsai Mon 4'; Luat Lat Maung 7'; Thein Zaw Htike 21'; Mensah 31'; Elysee Ngang Anla A 35'; Naing Ko Lin 74'; Godwin 90'		Gar Gar 38'

21 June 2017	Myawady	0 - 3	Mahar United	Thuwunna Stadium
16:00 UTC+06:30			Thet Naung Htwe 29'; Friday 50'; Myo Min Phyo 63'

21 June 2017	Pong Gan	0 - 2	University	Aung San Stadium
16:00 UTC+06:30			Aung Thant Zaw 26'; Arkar Moe 65'

22 June 2016	City Yangon	1 - 1	Dagon	Thuwunna Stadium
16:00 UTC+06:30	Myo Min Zaw 47'

=== Week 17 ===
25 June 2017	Pong Gan	1 - 1	Mawyawadi	Aung San Stadium, Yangon
16:00 UTC+06:30	Soe Myat Thu 24'		Saw Myo Lin 9'

25 June 2016	Phoenix	1 - 4	Mahar United	Aung San Stadium
16:00 UTC+06:30	Naing Ko Ko 78'		Toe Sat Naing 24'; Samuel 41', 44', 74'

25 June 2017	Myawady	6 - 0	Silver Stars	Salin Stadium
16:00 UTC+06:30	Ye Htet Aung 34', 47'; Ye Wai Yan Soe 42', 78' (pen.); Myo Min Htut 60', 62'

26 June 2017	Dagon	0 - 1	City Stars	Aung San Stadium
16:00 UTC+06:30			Elysee Anla' A 53'

28 June 2017	University	1 - 6	City Yangon	Aung San Stadium
16:00 UTC+06:30	Aung Thant Zaw 5'		Joseph 14', 38', 70'; Thiha 40'; Chan Oo 56', 72'

=== Week 18 ===
4 July 2017	City Yangon	4 - 2	City Stars	Aung San Stadium, Yangon
16:00 UTC+06:30	Aung Phyo Phyo 24'; Joseph 16', 45+1', 78'		Elysee 14', 49'

4 July 2016	University	1 - 3	Mawyawadi	Thuwunna Stadium
15:30 UTC+06:30	Nay Myo Htwe 69'		Win Zaw Hein 21'; Zin Min Thant 50'; Saw Myo Lin 76'

5 July 2017	Dagon	2 - 0	Myawady	Thuwunna Stadium
15:30 UTC+06:30

5 July 2017	Mahar United	4 - 0	Pong gan	Aung San Stadium
15:30 UTC+06:30	Tun Tun Aung 12'; Kelvin Kudus 19'; Myo Min Phyo 49'; Toe Sat Naing 79'

6 July 2017	Silver Stars	1 - 2	Phoenix	Thuwunna Stadium
15:30 UTC+06:30	Naung Naung Kyaw 4'		Pyae Sone Naing 7', 38'

=== Week 19 ===
10 July 2017	Dagon	2 - 1	Pong Gan	Padonmar Stadium, Yangon
16:00 UTC+06:30	Nyut Win 83'; Zaw Zin Oo 90+2'		Nyein Chan Aung 51'

10 July 2016	Silver Stars	0 - 4	University	Thuwunna Stadium
15:30 UTC+06:30			Aung Thant Zaw 27', 81'; Arkar Moe 83', 90'

10 July 2017	City Stars	1 - 0	Phoenix	Aung San Stadium
15:30 UTC+06:30	Sai Zsai Mon 4'

11 July 2017	Mahar United	4 - 3	Mawyawadi	Aung San Stadium
15:30 UTC+06:30	Kyaw Swar Min 5'; Samuel 30', 50', 62'		Adofu Monday 55'; Saw Myo Lin 72'; Taylor 90'

11 July 2017	Myawady	1 - 3	City Yangon	Thuwunna Stadium
15:30 UTC+06:30			Isa Lumu 51'; Joseph 58'; Win Htet Aung 90+2'

=== Week 20 ===
15 July 2017	Dagon	v	University	Aung San Stadium, Yangon
16:00 UTC+06:30

15 July 2016	Phoenix	v	Myawady	Thuwunna Stadium
15:30 UTC+06:30

15 July 2017	Mawyawadi	v	Silver Stars	University Stadium
15:30 UTC+06:30

16 July 2017	City Stars	v	Pong Gan	Padonmar Stadium
15:30 UTC+06:30

16 July 2017	Mahar United	v	City Yangon	Aung San Stadium
15:30 UTC+06:30

== Top scorers ==
Rank	Player	Club	Goals
1	(Uganda) Joseph Mpande	City Yangon	30
2	(Nigeria) Samuel	Mahar United	21
3	(Myanmar) Win Naing Tun	Team Phoenix	14
4	(Myanmar) Ye Wai Yan Soe	Myawady	12
5	(Myanmar) Kaung Si Thu	Myawady	11
6	(Myanmar) Toe Sat Naing	Mahar United	9
7	(Nigeria) Barnas Friday	Mahar United	8
