= 2019 MNL-2 =

MNL-2
- Season: 2019
- Champions: Chin United
- Runner up: I.S.P.E
- Promoted: Chin United
- Matches: 56
- Goals: 189 (3.38 per match)
- Top goalscorer: Sullivan Taylor (17 goals)
- Biggest away win: Silver Stars 2-7 Royal Thanlyin (28.2.2019)
- Highest scoring: Chin United 5-4 Kachin United (29.6.2019)
- Longest unbeaten run: I.S.P.E (7 matches)
- Longest losing run: Silver Stars (11 matches)

The 2019 National League 2, also known as the 2019 MPT Myanmar National League 2, is the seventh season of the MNL-2, the second division league for association football clubs since its founding in 2012. At the end of the 2018 MNL-2, Royal Thanlyin won the MNL-2 title. After 2018 MNL-2 finished, Royal Thanlyin and Dagon FC promoted to 2019 Myanmar National League. Chin United will play again in 2019 MNL-2.

== Clubs ==
=== Stadiums ===
Club	Home City	Stadium	Capacity
Royal Thanlyin	Thanlyin	Thiha Depa Stadium	2,000
Myawady FC	Nay Pyi Taw	Wunna Theikdi Stadium	30,000
Myanmar University F.C.	Yangon	University Stadium	1,000
Kachin United	Kachin	Myitkyina Stadium	4,000
Mawyawadi FC	Lashio		
Silver Stars FC	Yangon	Thuwunna Stadium	30,000
I.S.P.E	Yangon	I.S.P.E Stadium	
Chin United	Kalay	Kalay Stadium	3,000

(*) – not ready to play. MNL clubs that have not had their home stadia ready to host home matches currently use Aung San Stadium and Thuwunna Stadium in Yangon.

=== Personnel and sponsoring ===
Note: Flags indicate national team as has been defined under FIFA eligibility rules. Players may hold more than one non-FIFA nationality.

Team	Head coach	Captain	Kit manufacturer	Shirt sponsor
Royal Thanlyin	(Myanmar) U Kyi Aye	(Myanmar) Phoe Lapyae	made by club	(Myanmar)
Myawady	(Myanmar) U Zin Htoo	(Myanmar) Ye Wai Yan Soe	(Thailand) Pro Sport	none
University	(Myanmar) U Zaw Min	(Myanmar) Thant Zin Aung	(Thailand) Grand Sport	(Myanmar) Kamayut media
Kachin United	(Myanmar) U Win Htay	(Myanmar) Aung Thu Win	(Thailand) Pro Sport	none
Mawyawadi	(Myanmar) U Tun Tun	(Myanmar) Aung Yarzar Oo	(Thailand) Pro//Sport	(Myanmar) M Life
Silver Stars	(Myanmar) U Myint Swe	(Myanmar) Kyaw Phyo Oo	(Thailand) Pro//Sport	
ISPE	(Myanmar) U Aung Nay Htoo	(Myanmar) Zin Ye Naung	(Myanmar) SCM	(Myanmar) SCM
Chin United	(Myanmar) U Soe Thein	(Myanmar) Nay Win Aung	(Thailand) Pro//Sport	(Myanmar) Balance fitness

== Result ==
=== League table ===
Pos	Team	Pld	W	D	L	GF	GA	GD	Pts	Promotion
1	Chin United	14	10	3	1	40	17	+23	33	2020 Myanmar National League
2	I.S.P.E	14	10	3	1	32	11	+21	33	2020 Myanmar National League
3	Myawady FC	14	8	4	2	31	9	+22	28	
4	Royal Thanlyin	14	5	3	6	29	26	+3	18	
5	Mawyawadi FC	14	5	3	6	13	14	−1	18	
6	Kachin United	14	4	2	8	17	31	−14	14	
7	Silver Stars FC	14	3	0	11	17	49	−32	9	
8	Myanmar University F.C.	14	1	2	11	10	31	−21	5	

Source: National League 2

== Matches ==
Fixtures and results of the 2019 National League 2 season.

=== Week 1 ===
25/1/2019	Myawady	1-1	ISPE	Padaonmar Stadium, Yangon
16:00 UTC+06:30	Wai Yan Oo 30'		Thant Zin Myint 83'

25/1/2019	Royal Thanlyin	1-2	Mawyawadi	Salin Stadium, Yangon
16:00 UTC+06:30	Kyaw Swar Lin 69'		Adegboyega 60'; Sai Lin Oo 89'

26/1/2018	Kachin United	3-1	Silver Stars	Padonmar Stadium, Yangon
16:00 UTC+06:30	Aung Htet Paing 8'; Gun Lun 64'; Thu Rain Win 67'		Ye Thiha 26'

26/1/2019	University	1-5	Chin United	Salin Stadium, Yangon
16:00 UTC+06:30	Pyae Phyo Kyaw 34'		Taylor 27', 85'; Aung Myat Thu 39', 52', 62'

=== Week 2 ===
31/1/2019	Royal Thanlyin	0-0	University	Salin Stadium, Yangon
15:30 UTC+06:30

31/1/2019	Kachin United	1-1	Myawady	Padonmar Stadium, Yangon
15:30 UTC+06:30	Aung Htet Paing 26'		Wai Yan Oo 83'

1/2/2019	Mawyawadi	0-0	I.S.P.E	Salin Stadium, Yangon
15:30 UTC+06:30

1/2/2019	Chin United	4-1	Silver Stars	Padonmar Stadium, Yangon
15:30 UTC+06:30	Nan Min Aung 34'; Taylor 25', 31', 68'		Thet Aung 83'

=== Week 3 ===
8/2/2019	I.S.P.E	2-1	Silver Stars	Salin Stadium, Yangon
15:30 UTC+06:30	Khin Kyaw Win 22', 39'		Thet Aung 24'

8/2/2019	University	0-1	Mawyawadi	Padonmar Stadium, Yangon
15:30 UTC+06:30			Sai Lin Oo 55'

1/2/2019	Myawady	1-0	Royal Thanlyin	Padonmar Stadium, Yangon
15:30 UTC+06:30	Naing Zin Htet 73'

1/2/2019	Kachin United	0-1	Chin United	Salin Stadium, Yangon
15:30 UTC+06:30			Nan Min Aung 90'

=== Week 4 ===
15/2/2019	University	0-3	Myawady	Salin Stadium, Yangon
15:30 UTC+06:30			Ye Wai Yan Soe 14'; Phyo Min Hteik 25'; Naing Zin Htet 75'

15/2/2019	Kachin United	1-3	I.S.P.E	Padonmar Stadium, Yangon
15:30 UTC+06:30	S Gun Lun 9'		Htet Arkar Lin 55'; Zaw Mon Aung 44'; Thant Zin Myint 80'

16/2/2019	Royal Thanlyin	1-1	Chin United	Padonmar Stadium, Yangon
15:30 UTC+06:30	Nyein Chan Soe 90' (pen.)		Aung Myat Thu 53'

16/2/2019	Silver Stars	0-2	Mawyawadi	Salin Stadium, Yangon
15:30 UTC+06:30			San Myo Lin 55'; Adebayo Oyetone 87'

=== Week 5 ===
22/2/2019	Myawady	4-0	Silver Stars	Salin Stadium, Yangon
15:30 UTC+06:30	Shine Wunna Aung 77'; Phone Kyaw Zin 83', 90+1'; Phyo Min Htike 88'

22/2/2019	I.S.P.E	4-0	University	Padonmar Stadium, Yangon
15:30 UTC+06:30	Htet Arkar Lin 36'; Zaw Moon Aung 38'; Aung Zayar Phyo 71'; Kyaw Myo Naing 83'

16/2/2019	Royal Thanlyin	4-1	Kachin United	Padonmar Stadium, Yangon
15:30 UTC+06:30	Naing Ko Lin 25', 42' (pen.); Elysee 52'; Kyaw Swar Lin 56'		Ya Nuang 84'

16/2/2019	Chin United	1-1	Mawyawadi	Salin Stadium, Yangon
15:30 UTC+06:30	Min Thu 83'		Adebayo Oyentone 16'

=== Week 6 ===
28/2/2019	University	0-1	Kachin United	Salin Stadium, Yangon
15:30 UTC+06:30			Aung Htet Paing 73'

28/2/2019	Silver Stars	2-7	Royal Thanlyin	Padonmar Stadium, Yangon
15:30 UTC+06:30	Kyaw Wai Hlaing 41'; Thet Aung 87'		Sai Zsai Mon 7', 11', 34', 56'; Luat Latt Maung 66'; Zin Ko Soe 67'; Nyein Chan Soe 90+1'

1/3/2019	Mawyawadi	0-3	Myawady	Salin Stadium, Yangon
15:30 UTC+06:30			Phone Kyaw Zin 84'; Ye Wai Yan Soe 18'; Hein Zayar Lin 75' (pen.)

1/3/2019	I.S.P.E	2-1	Chin United	Padonmar Stadium, Yangon
15:30 UTC+06:30	Zaw Moon Aung 48', 83'		Saw Si I 7'

=== Week 7 ===
7/3/2019	Mawyawadi	0-1	Kachin United	Salin Stadium, Yangon
15:30 UTC+06:30			Aung Thu Win 73'

7/3/2019	Silver Stars	0-3	University	Padonmar Stadium, Yangon
15:30 UTC+06:30			Thant Zin 8'; Nyi Nyi Maung 39', 90+2'

8/3/2019	Myawady	1-2	Chin United	Salin Stadium, Yangon
15:30 UTC+06:30	Thet Paing Ko 5'		Aung Ko Ko Win 33'; Sullivan Taylor 77'

8/3/2019	I.S.P.E	3-0	Royal Thanlyin	Padonmar Stadium, Yangon
15:30 UTC+06:30	Aung Zayar Phyo 48', 83'; Zaw Moon Aung 45+1'; Arkar Phyo 79'

=== Week 8 ===
13/6/2019	Royal Thanlyin	7-2	Silver Stars	Salin Stadium, Yangon
15:30 UTC+06:30	Zin Ko Soe 2', 61'; Kyaw Swar Lin 22'; Sai Zsai Mon 26'; Ngang Elysee 51', 65'; Luat Latt Maung 74'		Aung Aung Oo 24'; That Wim Tun 87'

13/6/2019	Kachin United	2-1	University	Padonmar Stadium, Yangon
15:30 UTC+06:30	Zaw Soe 23'; S Gun Lun 88'		La Pyae Hein 33'

14/6/2019	Chin United	3-1	I.S.P.E	Salin Stadium, Yangon
15:30 UTC+06:30	Taylor 31', 59', 84'		Aung Zayar Phyo 69'

14/6/2019	Myawady	2-2	Mawyawadi	Padonmar Stadium, Yangon
15:30 UTC+06:30

=== Week 9 ===
21/6/2019	University	2-4	ISPE	Salin Stadium, Yangon
15:30 UTC+06:30	Thein Htet Aung 57'; Thant Zayar Win 84'		Thant Zin Myint 9'; Khin Kyaw Win 23', 44'; Zaw Moon Aung 47'

22/6/2019	Kachin United	1-4	Royal Thanlyin	Salin Stadium, Yangon
15:30 UTC+06:30	S Gun Lun 90+2'		Yaw Kusi 37'; Ngang Anla'A Elysee 55', 71'; Sai Zsai Mon 62'

22/6/2019	Mawyawadi	1-2	Chin United	Padonmar Stadium, Yangon
15:30 UTC+06:30	Oladimeji 57'		Saw Te 73'; Taylor 90+2'

25/6/2019	Silver Stars	1-5	Myawady	Salin Stadium, Yangon
15:30 UTC+06:30	Thet Win Tun 54'		Phone Kyaw Zin 21', 22', 43', 70' (pen.); Zin Min Htet 73'

=== Week 10 ===
28/6/2019	Mawyawadi	1-0	University	Salin Stadium, Yangon
15:30 UTC+06:30	Zaw Min Myat 81'

26/6/2019	Sliver Stars	1-5	ISPE	Padonmar Stadium, Yangon
15:30 UTC+06:30	Thet Aung 47'		Zaw moon Aung 16', 34', 57'; Min Myat Soe 39'; Kyaw Myo Naing 90'

29/6/2019	Royal Thanlyin	1-2	Myawady	Salin Stadium, Yangon
15:30 UTC+06:30	Elysee 76'		Phone Kyaw Zin 33', 42'

29/6/2019	Chin United	5-4	Kachin United	Padonmar Stadium, Yangon
15:30 UTC+06:30	Taylor 3', 19', 22'; Aung Myat Thu 6'; Saw Si I 55'		Chima Agbabus 12', 33', 60'; Toe Myint Two 67'

=== Week 11 ===
5/7/2019	University	1-1	Royal Thanlyin	Padonmar Stadium, Yangon
15:30 UTC+06:30	Pyae Phyo Kyaw 38'		Luat Latt Maung 7'

5/7/2019	Myawady	4-0	Kachin United	Salin Stadium, Yangon
15:30 UTC+06:30	Kaung Sithu 54'; Naing Zin Htet 67', 69'; Htet Phyo Wai 73'

6/7/2019	ISPE	1-0	Mawyawadi	Salin Stadium, Yangon
15:30 UTC+06:30	Zaw Moon Aung 66'

6/7/2019	Silver Stars	2-5	Chin United	Padonmar Stadium, Yangon
15:30 UTC+06:30	Okkar Soe 52'; Zaw Zaw Tun 56'		Aung Myat Thu 20', 61', 66'; Taylor 30', 54'

=== Week 12 ===
12/7/2019	ISPE	1-1	Kachin United	Salin Stadium, Yangon
15:30 UTC+06:30	Thant ZIn Myint 28'		Chima 43'

12/7/2019	Myawady	4-0	University	Padonmar Stadium, Yangon
15:30 UTC+06:30	Kaung Si Thu 2' (pen.); Naing Zin Htet 19', 54'

13/7/2019	Chin United	6-1	Royal Thanlyin	Salin Stadium, Yangon
15:30 UTC+06:30	Aung Myat Thu 8', 56', 89'; Diarra Salif 65'; Sullivan Tay Lar 81', 87'		Elysee 62'

13/7/2019	Mawyawadi	0-1	Silver Stars	Padonmar Stadium, Yangon
15:30 UTC+06:30			Aung Aung Oo 51'

=== Week 13 ===
18/7/2019	University	1-2	Silver Stars	Salin Stadium, Yangon
15:30 UTC+06:30	Thein Hteik Aung 38' (pen.)		Thet Aung 8', 64'

18/7/2019	Kachin United	0-3	Mawyawadi	Padonmar Stadium, Yangon
15:30 UTC+06:30			Arupe Oladimeji 13', 90'; Lwin Ko Naing 56'

20/7/2019	Chin United	0-0	Myawady	Salin Stadium, Yangon
15:30 UTC+06:30

20/7/2019	Royal Thanlyin	0-4	ISPE	Padonmar Stadium, Yangon
15:30 UTC+06:30			Chima Agbabus 12', 33', 60'; Toe Myint Two 67'

=== Week 14 ===
26/7/2019	Silver Stars	3-1	Kachin United	Salin Stadium, Yangon
15:30 UTC+06:30	Okkar Soe 28', 61'; Thet Aung 70'		Chima Agbabus 25'

26/7/2019	Mawyawadi	0-2	Royal Thanlyin	Padonmar Stadium, Yangon
15:30 UTC+06:30			Sai Zsai Mon 66'; Zin Ko Soe 74'

27/7/2019	ISPE	1-0	Myawady	Padinmar Stadium, Yangon
15:30 UTC+06:30	Wai Lin Aung 34' (pen.)

27/6/2019	Chin United	4-1	University	Salin Stadium, Yangon
15:30 UTC+06:30

== Season statistics ==
=== Top scorers ===
As of 5 March 2019.

Rank	Player	Club	Goals
1	(Liberia) Leon Sullivan Taylor	Chin United	17
2	(Myanmar) Aung Myat Thu	Chin United	11
3	(Myanmar) Zaw Moon Aung	I.S.P.E	10
4	(Myanmar) Phone Kyaw Zin	Myawady	9
5	(Nigeria) Ngang Elysee	Royal Thanlyin	7
6	(Myanmar) Phone Kyaw Zin	Myawady	6
6	(Myanmar) Sai Zsai Mon	Royal Thanlyin	6

=== Clean sheets ===
As of 15 March 2019.

Rank	Player	Club	Clean sheets
1	(Myanmar) San Pyae Sone Htay	Myawady	4
2	(Myanmar) Naing Lin Oo	Mawyawadi	3
2	(Myanmar) Zin Nyi Nyi Aung	I.S.P.E	3
3	(Myanmar) Sai Soe Moe Aung	Kachin United	2
3	(Myanmar) Kaung Sat Aung	University	2
5	(Myanmar) Zaw Zaw Naing	Royal Thanlyin	1
5	(Myanmar) Tin Maung Wai	Chin United	1

=== Hat-tricks ===
Player	For	Against	Result	Date
(Myanmar) Aung Myat Thu	Chin United	University	5-1	26 January 2019
(Liberia) Leon Sullivan Taylor	Chin United	Silver Stars	4-1	1 February 2019
(Myanmar) Sai Zsai Moon	Royal Thanlyin	Silver Stars	7-2	28 February 2019

== See also ==
- 2019 Myanmar National League
