= Leon Sullivan Taylor =

Liberian footballer (born 1998)

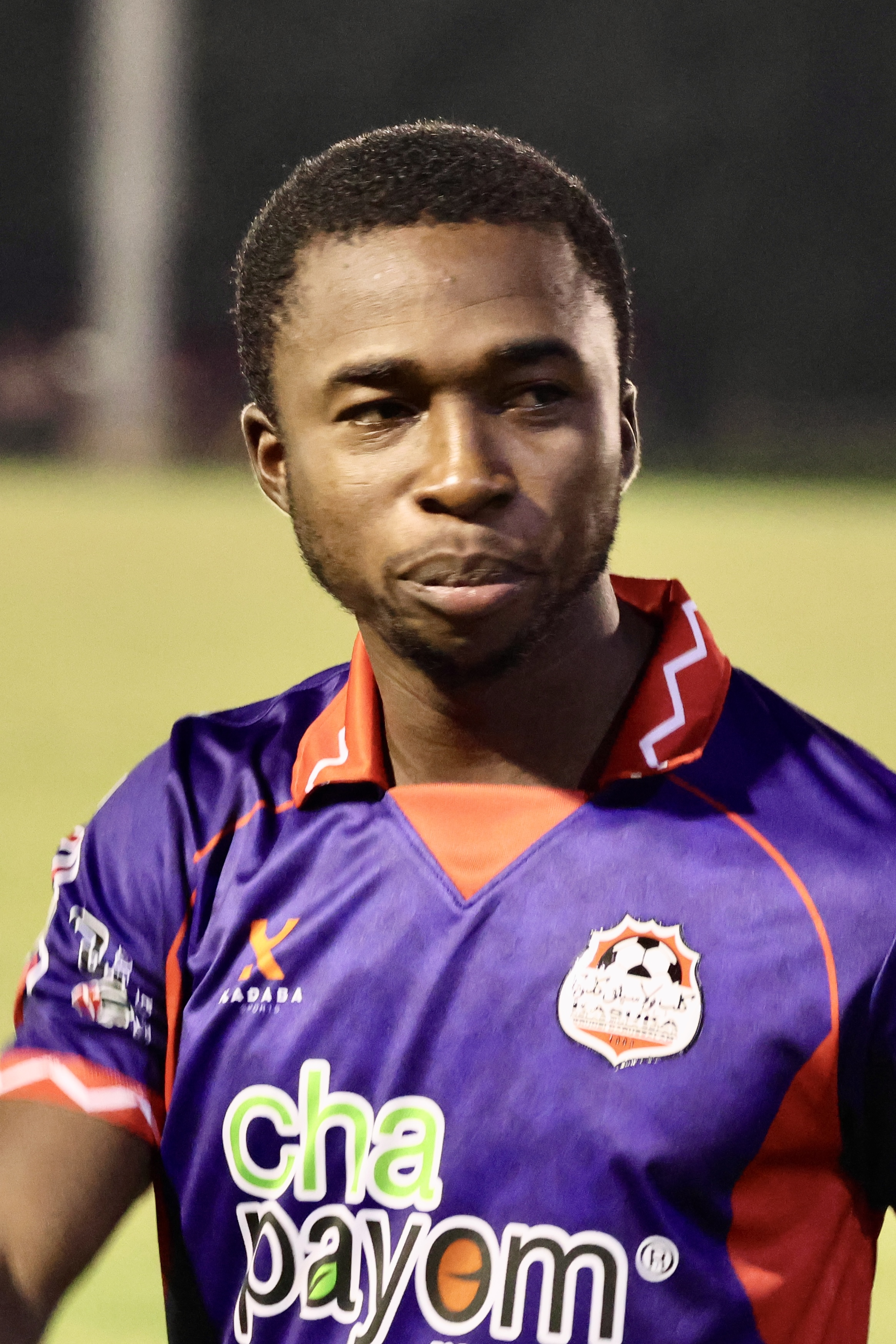
- Taylor with Kasuka in 2024

Personal information
- Full name: Leon Sullivan Taylor
- Date of birth: 19 April 1998 (age 28)
- Place of birth: Paynesville, Liberia
- Position: Forward

Team information
- Current team: Kasuka FC
- Number: 12

Youth career
- 2013–2018: Glow Lamp Academy

Senior career*
Years	Team	Apps	(Gls)
2017	Mawyawadi	3	(5)
2018	Royal Thanlyin	10	(14)
2019	Chin United	12	(17)
2020–2022	Kasuka	14	(16)
2023	See Khwae City	10	(1)
2023	Indera	14	(31)
2024	Maraleina	8	(5)
2024–2025	Kasuka	10	(15)
2025–2026	Indera	5	(8)
2026	Drukpa	10	(3)
2026–	Kasuka	4	(3)
- * Club domestic league appearances and goals as of 8 November 2026

Leon Sullivan Taylor (born 19 April 1998) is a Liberian professional footballer who plays as a forward for Kasuka FC of the Brunei Super League. He was the top scorer for two consecutive seasons of the Myanmar National League 2 as well as at the 2022 Brunei FA Cup and the 2023 Brunei Super League.

== Career ==
=== Mawyawadi ===
Taylor began his professional playing career in with Myanmar second division club Mawyawadi in 2017 after moving from Glow Lamp Academy in Ghana.

=== Royal Thanlyin ===
In 2018, Taylor joined Royal Thanlyin of the MNL-2. His 14 goals propelled them to the championship and prospective promotion to the 2019 Myanmar National League, nonetheless the club folded due to financial difficulties soon after.

=== Chin United ===
In 2019, Taylor moved to Chin United for the 2019 MNL-2 season, once again topping the goalscoring charts with 17 goals and helping the club from Chin State to winning the league and promotion to the top flight.

=== Kasuka ===
Taylor left Myanmar for Brunei in 2020 and signed for Kasuka at the start of the 2020 Brunei Super League. He scored on his debut in a 5–0 win over Kuala Belait on 1 March. However, after two rounds into the newly expanded league the COVID-19 pandemic started, forcing the suspension and subsequent cancellation of the league.

Taylor stayed with Kasuka for the next two years, scoring 15 goals in only six league matches in the 2021 Brunei Super League before a second league abandonment, then becoming top-scorer at the 2022 Brunei FA Cup in which his team went all the way to the final before losing 2–1 to DPMM. Taylor scored in said match in the 12th minute.

=== See Khwae City ===
At the turn of the year, Taylor transferred to See Khwae City of the Thai League 3 North midway through the 2022–23 season, replacing Hamzeh Sari of Iran who moved to Rasisalai United. He made 10 appearances for See Khwae City, scoring once against Nakhon Mae Sot United in a 2–0 win on 28 January.

=== Indera ===
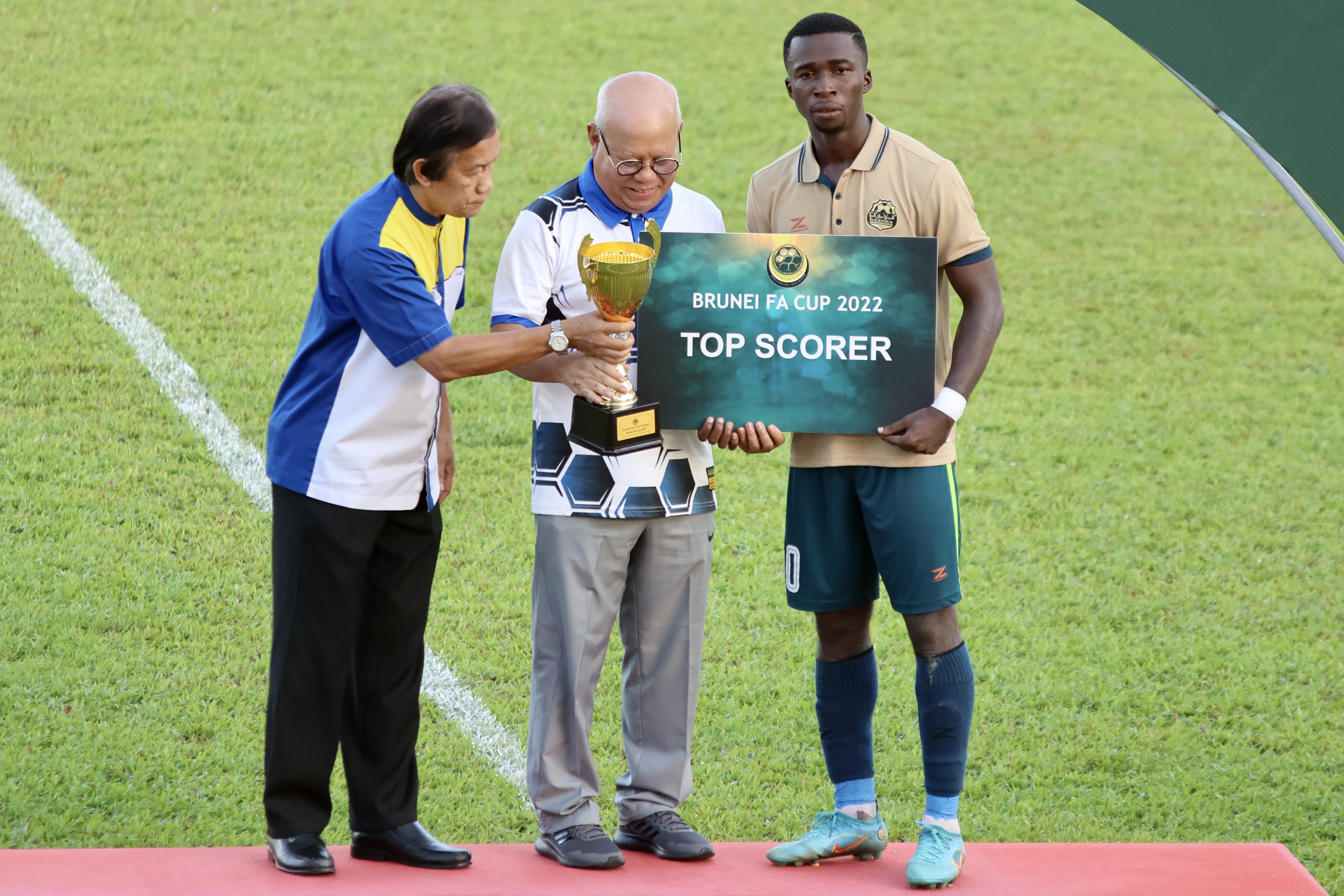
Taylor winning the 2022 Brunei FA Cup Top Scorer.

Taylor returned to Brunei at the conclusion of the league in March, signing for Indera. He made his debut on 5 May against AKSE Bersatu and scored on the 28th minute, then the game was suspended due to floodlight failure and was adjourned to 24 May. He netted again on the 81st minute to win the fragmented game for Indera with a 2–1 score. On 4 June 2023, Taylor scored four goals in a 6–0 victory over BSRC. The next month, he scored five goals in a 6–0 win over BAKES. He finished the truncated season as the top goalscorer with 31 goals.

=== Maraleina ===
At the start of 2024, Taylor moved back to the Thai League 3, this time with Maraleina. He scored on his debut match against Thap Luang United on 13 January in a 1–0 away victory. On 14 February, Taylor scored a hat-trick over Chainat United.

=== Return to Kasuka ===
In June 2024, Taylor returned to Kasuka in preparation for the 2024–25 ASEAN Club Championship qualifying play-offs where they faced Shan United of Myanmar. In the first leg on 17 July, he scored the solitary goal for the Bruneian club in a 1–1 draw at Bandar Seri Begawan. He was a second half substitute in the second leg at Thuwunna Stadium a week later, winning a penalty which was converted by Willian dos Santos for their consolation goal in a 3–1 defeat.

In the first league fixture for Kasuka in the 2024–25 Brunei Super League against Lun Bawang FC on 1 September 2024, Taylor scored a hat-trick against the Temburong District outfit in a 9–0 win. He followed this with two goals against both Jerudong FC and MS ABDB later that month. Fazed with a slight injury at the second half of the season, Taylor relinquished goalscoring duties to Brazilian playmaker Willian dos Santos but not before scoring four times against KB FC in a 9–0 trashing on 10 January. The two scored a combined total of 50 goals to win the league for Kasuka in dramatic fashion after beating league leaders DPMM FC II in their final fixture on 2 February.

=== Return to Indera ===
In April 2025, Taylor returned to Indera SC after the knockout stage of the 2025 Brunei FA Cup began. He scored the opening goal for Indera against MS PPDB in the second leg of the quarter-final on 2 May. Although Indera was able to advance all the way to the final, the trophy went to their opponents DPMM FC II with a 1–0 score.

After attending unsuccessful trials at several clubs since the middle of 2025, Taylor suited up for Indera again for the second half of the 2025–26 Brunei Super League season. On 23 January 2026 he scored a hat-trick against BSRC, surpassing Abdul Azizi Ali Rahman as the top goalscorer of the Brunei Super League. He completed another hat-trick against KB FC on 12 April. In the final match of the season which was the title-decider against former club Kasuka, Taylor netted a long-range effort in a 3–2 victory that handed Indera the Brunei league championship for the first time in 12 years.

=== Drukpa ===
In May 2026, Taylor transferred to newly-established club Drukpa FC of the Bhutan Premier League. He made his debut as a half-time substitute on 3 May against Paro FC and scored in a 2–4 victory.

=== Second Kasuka return ===
After three months in Bhutan, Taylor returned to Brunei with Kasuka for the third time in his career, in preparation for the club's 2026–27 AFC Challenge League and 2026–27 ASEAN Club Championship qualification campaigns. In his first outing back in Kasuka colours, he found the net in a 5–1 defeat to Manila Digger in the first leg of the 2026–27 ASEAN Club Championship qualifying play-off round.

== Honors ==
=== Club ===
Royal Thanlwin

- MNL-2: 2018

Chin United

- MNL-2: 2019

Kasuka

- Brunei Super League: 2024–25
- Brunei FA Cup runner-up: 2022

Indera

- Brunei Super League: 2025–26
- Brunei Super League runner-up: 2023
- Brunei FA Cup runner-up: 2025

=== Individual ===
- 2018 MNL-2 Top Scorer – 14 goals
- 2019 MNL-2 Top Scorer – 17 goals
- 2022 Brunei FA Cup Top Scorer – 25 goals
- 2023 Brunei Super League Top Scorer – 31 goals
