= 2018 MNL-2 =

MNL-2
- Season: 2018
- Champions: Royal Thanlyin
- Runner up: Dagon FC
- Promoted: Royal Thanlyin; Dagon FC
- Matches: 84
- Goals: 162 (1.93 per match)
- Top goalscorer: Leon Taylor (14 goals)
- Biggest home win: Royal Thanlyin 5–0 Silver Stars (15.6.2018)
- Biggest away win: Silver Stars 2–4 Mawyawadi (3.3.2018)
- Highest scoring: Silver Stars 5–2 Mountain Lion (16.3.2018)

The 2018 National League 2, also known as the 2018 MPT Myanmar National League 2, is the sixth season of the MNL-2, the second division league for association football clubs since its founding in 2012. At the end of the 2017 MNL-2, City Yangon F.C. won the MNL-2 title. And then, City Yangon F.C. and Sagaing United promoted to 2018 Myanmar National League. But City Yangon F.C. quit from Myanmar National League. So, Myawady FC auto promoted to 2018 Myanmar National League. City Yangon F.C. and Chin United F.C. abandoned their clubs. In 2018 National League 2, there is only seven will play for MNL-2 winner.

MPT and MNL signed a sponsor for the Myanmar National League, MNL-2 and Youth league. MPT signed 3 years sponsor start from 2018 to 2020.

== Name Changed for 2018 National League 2 ==
- Finance and Revenue FC changed to Mountain Lion.
- City Stars F.C. changed to Royal Thanlyin.
- Pong Gan FC changed to Kachin United.

== Result ==
=== League table ===
Pos	Team	Pld	W	D	L	GF	GA	GD	Pts	Promotion
1	Royal Thanlyin	12	7	4	1	28	18	+10	25	2019 Myanmar National league
2	Dagon FC	12	5	5	2	23	17	+6	20	2019 Myanmar National league
3	Myanmar University F.C.	12	4	7	1	25	14	+11	19	
4	Kachin United	12	3	6	3	23	25	−2	15	
5	Mawyawadi FC	12	3	4	5	23	22	+1	13	
6	Silver Stars FC	12	2	5	5	24	32	−8	11	
7	Myanmar Lions	12	1	3	8	16	34	−18	6	

== Matches ==
Fixtures and results of the 2018 National League 2 season.

=== Week 1 ===
26/1/2018	Mawyawadi	2–2	Dagon	Thuwunna Stadium, Yangon
16:00 UTC+06:30	Frank 59'; Samuel 90+1'		Soe Myat Thu 39', 86'

26/1/2018	University	2–2	Kachin United	Padonmar Stadium
16:00 UTC+06:30

26/1/2018	Silver Stars	1–2	Royal Thanlyin	Salin Stadium, Yangon
16:00 UTC+06:30

=== Week 2 ===
2/2/2018	Royal Thanlyin	1–1	Mountain Lion	Thuwunna Stadium, Yangon
16:00 UTC+06:30	Taylor 13'		Kyaw Zin Oo 28'

2/2/2018	University	2–2	Silver Stars	Padonmar Stadium, Yangon
16:00 UTC+06:30

2/2/2018	Dagon	0–1	Kachin United	Salin Stadium, Yangon
16:00 UTC+06:30			Zaw Lin Oo 89'

=== Week 3 ===
16/2/2018	Kachin United	3–2	Mawyawadi	Thuwunna Stadium, Yangon
16:00 UTC+06:30	Pyaw Du Aung 35', 77'; Saw Ge Htu 54'		Samuel 66'; Zin Min Thant 76'

16/2/2018	Mountain Lion	2–1	Silver Stars	Aung San Stadium, Yangon
16:00 UTC+06:30	Kyaw Zin Oo 39', 90+3'		Nay Myo Htwe 82' (pen.)

16/2/2018	Dagon	0–0	Silver Stars	Salin Stadium, Yangon
16:00 UTC+06:30

=== Week 4 ===
23/2/2018	Mawyawadi	5–1	Mountain Lions	Thuwunna Stadium, Yangon
16:00 UTC+06:30

23/2/2018	Kachin United	2–3	Royal Thanlyin	Aung San Stadium, Yangon
16:00 UTC+06:30

23/2/2018	University	1–1	Dagon	Salin Stadium, Yangon
16:00 UTC+06:30

=== Week 5 ===
3/3/2018	Silver Stars	2–4	Mawyawadi	Salin Stadium, Yangon
16:00 UTC+06:30

3/3/2018	Mountain Lion	1–2	Kachin United	Padonmar Stadium, Yangon
16:00 UTC+06:30

3/3/2018	Royal Thanlyin	2–2	University	Aung san Stadium, Yangon
16:00 UTC+06:30

=== Week 6 ===
16/3/2018	Dagon	2–3	Royal Thanlyin	Padonmar Stadium, Yangon
16:00 UTC+06:30	Zaw Lin Oo 45+1', 48'		Laut Lat Maung 23'; Taylor 52'; Ye Lin Htet 63'

16/3/2018	Silver Stars	5–2	Mountain Lion	Thuwunna Stadium, Yangon
16:00 UTC+06:30	Nyi Nyi Aung 3', 41', 89'; Paing Moe Wai 21'; Naung Naung Kyaw 33'		Aung Myat Thu 32', 76'

5/4/2018	Mawyawadi	0–2	University	Thuwunna Stadium, Yangon
16:00 UTC+06:30			Naing Ye Aung 80', 88'

=== Week 7 ===
23/3/2018	Mountain Lion	1–2	Dagon	Padonmar Stadium, Yangon
16:00 UTC+06:30	Kyaw Zin Oo 65'		Phyo Nyi Nyi Lwin 24'; Khant Min Eaim 60'

23/3/2018	Royal Thanlyin	1–0	Mawyawadi	Salin Stadium, Yangon
16:00 UTC+06:30	Luat Lat Maung 9'

23/3/2018	Kachin United	4–3	Silver Stars	Aung San Stadium, Yangon
16:00 UTC+06:30	Arupe Yinuse 14'; Pyaw Du Aung 26', 56', 90+3'		Naing Naing Lin 17'; Nyi Nyi Aung 45+2', 61'

=== Week 8 ===
25/5/2018	Royal Thanlyin	1–1	Dagon	Thuwunna Stadium, Yangon
16:00 UTC+06:30	Taylor 11'		Soe Myat Thu 25'

25/5/2018	University	0–0	Mawyawadi	Padonmar Stadium, Yangon
16:00 UTC+06:30

25/5/2018	Mountain Lion	2–2	Silver Stars	SaLin Stadium, Yangon
16:00 UTC+06:30	Aung Myat Thu 15'; Nyein Chan Soe 38'		Naing Naing Lin 5'; Kyaw Phyo Oo 82'

=== Week 9 ===
1/6/2018	Mawyawadi	2–2	Kachin United	Sa Lin Stadium, Yangon
15:30 UTC+06:30	Zin Min Thant 8' (pen.), 47'		Paw Du Aung 23'; Yan Kha 55'

1/6/2018	University	4–1	Mountain Lion	Thuwunna Stadium, Yangon
16:00 UTC+06:30	Kyaw Htet Aung 12'; Tar Yar Tin Thein 34'; Thant Zayar Win 47'; Kaung Khat Win Htet 49'		Thet lwin Oo 60'

3/6/2018	Silver Stars	3–2	Dagon	Thuwunna Stadium, Yangon
16:00 UTC+06:30	Aung Myo Thura 15', 41'; Than Win 77'		Zaw Lin Oo 53', 67'

=== Week 10 ===
15/6/2018	Dagon	4–3	Mawyawadi	Thuwunna Stadium, Yangon
16:00 UTC+06:30

15/6/2018	Royal Thanlyin	5–0	Silver Stars	Padonmar Stadium, Yangon
16:00 UTC+06:30	Taylor 27', 68', 69', 85'; Elysee 58'

15/6/2018	Kachin United	0–0	University	SaLin Stadium, Yangon
16:00 UTC+06:30

=== Week 11 ===
22/6/2018	Mountain Lion	1–4	Royal Thanlyin	Thuwunna Stadium, Yangon
15:30 UTC+06:30

22/6/2018	Silver Stars	2–5	University	Padonmar Stadium, Yangon
15:30 UTC+06:30	Kyaw Phyo Oo 47'; Aung Myo ThuRa 90+3' (pen.)		Kaung Zayar Phyo 16'; Thant Zayar Win 36', 76'; Naing Ye Aung 62', 78'

22/6/2018	Kachin United	1–4	Dagon	SaLin Stadium, Yangon
15:30 UTC+06:30	Paw Du aung 68'		Khant Min Eaim 1'; Zaw Lin Oo 45+1'; Soe Myat Thu 78', 79'

=== Week 12 ===
29/6/2018	Silver Stars	2–2	Kachin United	Thuwunna Stadium, Yangon
15:30 UTC+06:30	Aung Myo Thura 62', 75'		Paw Du Aung 60'; Bawn Yaw 87'

29/6/2018	Mawyawadi	1–3	Royal Thanlyin	Sa Lin Stadium, Yangon
15:30 UTC+06:30	Zin Min Thant 89'		Elysee 26'; Stephen 70'; Taylor 86'

22/6/2018	Dagon	3–1	Mountain Lion	Padonmar Stadium, Yangon
15:30 UTC+06:30

=== Week 13 ===
13/7/2018	Kachin United	3–3	Mountain Lion	Padonmar Stadium, Yangon
15:30 UTC+06:30

13/7/2018	University	5–1	Royal Thanlyin	Sa Lin Stadium, Yangon
15:30 UTC+06:30

14/7/2018	Mawyawadi	2–2	Silver Stars	Padonmar Stadium, Yangon
15:30 UTC+06:30

=== Week 14 ===
20/7/2018	Mountain Lion	0–2	Mawyawadi	Padonmar Stadium, Yangon
15:30 UTC+06:30

20/7/2018	Royal Thanlyin	2–2	Kachin United	Sa Lin Stadium, Yangon
15:30 UTC+06:30	Taylor 30'; Elysee 35'		Paw Du Aung 52'; Arupe Oladimeji 90'

20/7/2018	Dagon	1–1	University	Padonmar Stadium, Yangon
15:30 UTC+06:30	Tar Rar Tin Thein 66'		Zaw Lin Oo 77'

== Top scorers ==
Rank	Player	Club	Goals
1	(Liberia) Leon Sullivan Taylor	Royal Thanlyin	14
2	(Myanmar) Pyaw Du Aung	Kachin United	11
3	(Myanmar) Zin Min Thant	Mawyawadi	10
4	(Myanmar) Zaw Lin Oo	Dagon	9
5	(Myanmar) Soe Myat Thu	Dagon	7
5	(Myanmar) Aung Myo Thura	Silver Stars	7

== Awards ==
=== Monthly awards ===
Month	Coach of the Month		Player of the Month		Reference
Month	Coach	Club	Player	Club	Reference
February	(Myanmar) Daw Aye Aye Maw	Royal Thanlyin	(Myanmar) Kyaw Zin Oo	Mountain Lions	MNL
March	(Myanmar) Myint Swe	Kachin United	(Myanmar) Zin Min Thant	Mawyawadi	MNL
June	(Myanmar) U Min Kyi	Dagon	(Myanmar) Aung Myo Thura	Silver Stars	MNL
