= Thiha =

Thiha (Burmeze: သီဟ) is a Burmese name that may refer to

- Hein Thiha Zaw (born 1995), Burmese footballer
- Maha Thiha Thura (disambiguation)
- Thiha Zaw (born 1993), Burmese footballer
- Thiha (footballer), Burmese footballer

== See also ==
- Hermits Tissa and Thiha, Burmese Buddhist monks
