= 2020 MNL-2 =

MNL-2
- Season: 2020
- Champions: Junior Lions
- Runner up: Chinland
- Matches: 28
- Goals: 12 (0.43 per match)
- Top goalscorer: (Myanmar) Kaung Thet Naing (3 goals)

The 2020 National League 2, also known as the 2020 MPT Myanmar National League 2, is the eighth season of the MNL-2, the second division league for association football clubs since its founding in 2012. 3 months after being temporarily cancelled, the league itself was suspended.

Chinland and Junior Lions both promoted to the 2021 Myanmar National League. However, in the 2022 season, Myawady took Junior Lions' place. The 1st transfer window is from 9 November 2019 to 10 January 2020 . The 2nd mid season transfer window is from 6 April 2020 to 7 May 2020.

== Changes from last season ==
=== Team changes ===
==== New Clubs ====
- Junior Lions (Myanmar U-19)

==== Relegated Clubs ====
Relegated from the 2019 Myanmar National League

- Dagon (Withdrawn)
- Chinland

== Title sponsor ==
Myanma Posts and Telecommunications signed 3 years contract with the MNL.

== Clubs ==
=== Stadiums ===
| Club | Home City | Stadium | Capacity |
|---|---|---|---|
| Myawady FC | Nay Pyi Taw | Wunna Theikdi Stadium | 30,000 |
| Myanmar University F.C. | Yangon | University Stadium | 1,000 |
| Kachin United | Kachin | Myitkyina Stadium | 4,000 |
| Mawyawadi FC | Lashio | Lashio Stadium | |
| Silver Stars FC | Yangon | Thuwunna Stadium | 30,000 |
| Chinland | Chin | Hakha Stadium | |
| Junior Lions | Yangon | Thuwunna Stadium | 30,000 |
| Yaw Myay FC | Magwe | Magwe Stadium | |

=== Personnel and sponsoring ===
Note: Flags indicate national team as has been defined under FIFA eligibility rules. Players may hold more than one non-FIFA nationality.

| Team | Head coach | Captain | Kit manufacturer | Shirt sponsor |
|---|---|---|---|---|
| Myawady FC | (Myanmar) U Mg Mg Aye | (Myanmar) Wai Yan Oo | (Thailand) Peegan | |
| Myanmar University FC | (Myanmar) U Zaw Min | (Myanmar) Kaung Thet Naing | (Thailand) Pro//Sport | |
| Kachin United | (Myanmar) U Than Htike | (Myanmar) Mung Htoi Aung | (Thailand) Pro//Sport | |
| Mawyawadi FC | (Myanmar) U Tun Tun | (Myanmar) Zin Min Thant | (Thailand) Pro//Sport | (Myanmar) M.Life |
| Silver Stars FC | (Myanmar) U Moe Kyaw Htwe | (Myanmar) Thet Lwin Soe | (Thailand) Pro//Sport | |
| Chinland | (Myanmar) U Phone Naing | (Myanmar) Shwe Win Tun | made by club | (Myanmar) Chinland Flower |
| Junior Lions FC | (Myanmar) U Soe Myat Min | (Myanmar) Sithu Moe Khant | (Thailand) Warrix | |
| Yaw Myay FC | (Myanmar) U Win Htay | (Myanmar) Arkar Soe | made by club | (Myanmar) Champions Sports |

=== Foreign players ===
| Club | Player 1 | Player 2 | Player 3 | Asian Player | Former |
|---|---|---|---|---|---|
| Myawady FC | | | | | |
| Myanmar University FC | | | | | |
| Kachin United | (Nigeria) Ejimadu Chima Agbabus | (Nigeria) Egbde Climt Chukwubuka | | | |
| Mawyawadi FC | (Ghana) Addae Joceph | (Ghana) Michael Tetteh | (Nigeria) Lawal Abass | | |
| Silver Stars FC | | | | | |
| Chinland | (Nigeria) George Kehinde Oletunde | (Nigeria) Babatunde Abiodun | | | |
| Junior Lions FC | | | | | |
| Yaw Myay FC | | | | | |

== Result ==
=== League table ===
| Pos | Team | Pld | W | D | L | GF | GA | GD | Pts | Promotion |
|---|---|---|---|---|---|---|---|---|---|---|
| 1 | Chinland | 7 | 6 | 0 | 1 | 23 | 6 | +17 | 18 | 2020 MNL-2 |
| 2 | Myawady FC | 7 | 6 | 0 | 1 | 15 | 6 | +9 | 18 | 2020 MNL-2 |
| 3 | Junior Lions | 7 | 6 | 0 | 1 | 21 | 3 | +18 | 18 | |
| 4 | University | 7 | 3 | 1 | 3 | 13 | 12 | +1 | 10 | |
| 5 | Mawyawadi FC | 7 | 3 | 0 | 4 | 15 | 12 | +3 | 9 | |
| 6 | Silver Stars FC | 7 | 1 | 2 | 4 | 13 | 17 | −4 | 5 | |
| 7 | Kachin United | 7 | 1 | 1 | 5 | 15 | 12 | +3 | 4 | |
| 8 | Yaw Myay | 7 | 0 | 0 | 7 | 4 | 51 | −47 | 0 | |

Source: National League 2

== Matches ==
Fixtures and Results of the 2020 MNL-2 season.

=== Week 1 ===
| 23/1/2020 | Chinland FC | 3-2 | Mawyawadi FC | Padonmar Stadium, Yangon |
| 15:30 UTC+06:30 | David Lalhruet Fela 29'; Babatunde 59'; Mung Teih Pau 73' | | Kyaw Zay Ya 27', 51' |

| 23/1/2020 | Kachin United | 0-2 | Myawady FC | Salin Stadium, Yangon |
| 16:00 UTC+06:30 | | | Kaung Sithu 11'; Thant Zin Aung 71' |

| 24/1/2020 | Silver Stars FC | 0-1 | Junior Lions FC | Salin Stadium, Yangon |
| 15:30 UTC+06:30 | | | Zaw Win Thein 31' |

| 24/1/2020 | University FC | 4-0 | Yaw Myay FC | University Stadium, Yangon |
| 15:30 UTC+06:30 | Kaung Thet Naing 10', 23', 47' , Khaing Ye Win 53' |

=== Week 2 ===
| 29/1/2020 | Mawyawadi | 2-0 | Kachin United | Padonmar Stadium, Yangon |
| 15:30 UTC+06:30 | Kyaw Zaya 33'; Micheal 88' |

| 29/1/2020 | Yaw Myay | 0-10 | Chinland | Salin Stadium, Yangon |
| 16:00 UTC+06:30 | | | Yaw Kusi 6', 37'; Mung Thein Paw 10', 33', 45'; Soe Min Tun 18', 85'; Babatunde Abiodun 20', 38'; Thawng Lian Thang 34' |

| 30/1/2020 | Myawady | 4-2 | Silver Stars | Salin Stadium, Yangon |
| 15:30 UTC+06:30 | Phone Kyaw Zin 7', 11' (pen.); Phyo Min Hteik 63'; Htet Wai Phyo 65' | | Oakkar Soe 82', 90+3' |

| 30/1/2020 | Junior Lions | 2-0 | University | Padonmar Stadium, Yangon |
| 15:30 UTC+06:30 | Khun Kyaw Zin Hein 35'; Yan Kyaw Soe 67' |

=== Week 3 ===
| 14/2/2020 | Myawady | 0-1 | Chinland | Padonmar Stadium, Yangon |
| 15:30 UTC+06:30 | | | David Fela 90' |

| 14/2/2020 | Mawyawadi | 1-4 | Junior Lions | Salin Stadium, Yangon |
| 16:00 UTC+06:30 | Kyaw Zay Ya 61' | | Thet Hein Soe 30'; Khun Kyaw Zin Hein 67'; Nyi Nyi 73'; La Min Htwe 79' |

| 15/2/2020 | Kachin United | 13-0 | Yaw Myay | Salin Stadium, Yangon |
| 15:30 UTC+06:30 |

| 16/2/2020 | Silver Stars | 3-3 | University | Padonmar Stadium, Yangon |
| 15:30 UTC+06:30 |

=== Week 4 ===
| 20/2/2020 | Yaw Myay | 3-4 | Silver Stars | Padonmar Stadium, Yangon |
| 15:30 UTC+06:30 | Tin Htoo Aung 42' (pen.); Saw Ai Tar Taw 45'; Aung Ko Ko Tun 76' | | Chit Hla Aung 11'; Ye Thiha 52'; Oakar Soe 61', 85' |

| 20/2/2020 | Chinland | 3-1 | University | Salin Stadium, Yangon |
| 16:00 UTC+06:30 | Yaw Kusi 6'; Mung Teih Paw 22'; Htun Lin Aung 32' | | Soe Min Naung 63' |

| 21/2/2020 | Junior Lions | 1-0 | Kachin United | Padonmar Stadium, Yangon |
| 15:30 UTC+06:30 | Nyan Lin Htet 37' |

| 21/2/2020 | Myawady | 2-1 | Mawyawadi | Salin Stadium, Yangon |
| 15:30 UTC+06:30 | Kaung Sithu 34'; Thet Paing Ko 45+1' | | Lawal Abass 68' |

=== Week 5 ===
| 27/2/2020 | Silver Stars | 2-3 | Chinland | Padonmar Stadium, Yangon |
| 15:30 UTC+06:30 | Oakar Soe 54' (pen.); Thet WIn Tun 84' | | Yaw Kusi 15'; Mung Teih Paw 28'; Tun Lin Aung 48' |

| 28/2/2020 | University | 2-0 | Kachin United | University Stadium, Yangon |
| 16:00 UTC+06:30 |

| 28/2/2020 | Yaw Myay | 0-6 | Mawyawai | Salin Stadium, Yangon |
| 15:30 UTC+06:30 |

| 21/3/2020 | Junior Lions | 1-2 | Myawady | Padonmar Stadium, Yangon |
| 15:30 UTC+06:30 | Min Khant Maung 90+2' | | Kaung Sithu 2'; Phone Kyaw Zin 76' |

=== Week 6 ===
| 5/3/2020 | Myawady | 3-1 | Yaw Myay | Salin Stadium, Yangon |
| 15:30 UTC+06:30 | Kaung Sithu 55'; Htet Wai Phyo 81', 85' | | Thin Htoo Aung 26' |

| 5/3/2020 | Mawyawadi | 2-3 | University | Padonmar Stadium, Yangon |
| 15:30 UTC+06:30 | Zin Min Thant 34', 49' | | Soe Min Naung 24', 84'; Ye Min Oo 74' |

| 6/3/2020 | Kachin United | 2-2 | Silver Stars | Padonmar Stadium, Yangon |
| 16:00 UTC+06:30 | Soe Myat Thu 2'; Ejimadu Chima 58' | | Oakar Soe 38' (pen.), 87' (pen.) |

| 9/3/2020 | Chinland | 0-1 | Junior Lions | Salin Stadium, Yangon |
| 15:30 UTC+06:30 | | | Zaw Win Thein 21' |

=== Week 7 ===
| 9/3/2020 | University | 0-2 | Myawady | Padonmar Stadium, Yangon |
| 15:30 UTC+06:30 | | | Kaung Sithu 35', 41' |

| 14/3/2020 | Kachin United | 0-3 | Chinland | Padonmar Stadium, Yangon |
| 15:30 UTC+06:30 | | | Yaw Kusi 23'; Tint Aung Kyaw 67' (pen.); Mung Theih Paw 90' |

| 14/3/2020 | Silver Stars | 0-1 | Mawyawai | Salin Stadium, Yangon |
| 16:00 UTC+06:30 | | | Lawal Abass 66' |

| 15/3/2020 | Yaw Myay | 0-11 | Junior Lions | Padonmar Stadium, Yangon |
| 15:30 UTC+06:30 | | | Nyi Nyi 10', 24', 41', 54', 63'; Wai Yan Soe 13'; Zaw Win Thein 17', 53', 60'; La Min Htwe 32', 68' |

== Season statistics ==
=== Top scorers ===
As of 15 March 2020.

| Rank | Player | Club | Goals |
|---|---|---|---|
| 1 | (Myanmar) Oakar Soe | Silver Stars | 9 |
| 4 | (Myanmar) Kyaw Zaya | Mawyawadi | 6 |
| 4 | (Myanmar) Paw Du Aung | Kachin United | 6 |
| 4 | (Myanmar) Mung Teih Paw | Chinland | 6 |

== Awards ==
=== Monthly awards ===
| Month | Coach of the Month | | Player of the Month | | Reference |
| Month | Coach | Club | Player | Club | Reference |
|---|---|---|---|---|---|
| January | (Myanmar) Maung Maung Aye | Myawady | (Myanmar) Kaung Sithu | Myawady | |
| February | (Myanmar) Phone Naing | Chinland | (Myanmar) Mung Teih Paw | Chinland | |
