= Football records and statistics in Myanmar =

This page details football records in Myanmar.

== Most successful teams ==
Team	Total number of trophies	MNL winners	MNL-2 winners	GASS winners	Charity Cup winners
Shan United	11	6 (2017, 2019, 2020, 2022, 2023, 2024–25)		2 (2017, 2024)	3 (2014, 2019, 2020 )
Yangon United	11	5 (2011, 2012, 2013, 2015, 2018)		3 (2011, 2018, 2019)	3 (2013, 2016, 2018)
Yadanarbon	5	4 (2009, 2010, 2014, 2016)		1 (2009)	
Ayeyawady United	5			3 (2012, 2014, 2015)	2 (2012, 2015)
Chin United	2		2 (2013, 2019)		
Hanthawady United	2		1 (2014)	1 (2010)	
Magwe	2			1 (2016)	1 (2017)
Southern Myanmar	1		1 (2015)		
Manawmyay	1		1 (2016)		
City Yangon	1		1 (2017)		
Royal Thanlyin	1		1 (2018)		
University	1		1 (2022)		
Thitsar Arman	1		1 (2023)		
Chinland FC	1		1 (2024)		

== Top-performing clubs – league structures ==
=== Myanmar National League ===
Club	Champions
Shan United	6 (2017, 2019, 2020, 2022, 2023, 2024–25)
Yangon United	5 (2011, 2012, 2013, 2015, 2018)
Yadanarbon	4 (2009, 2010, 2014, 2016)

==== The Invincibles ====
Unbeatable champions:

- Shan United in 2022, 2023, 2024–25

=== MNL-2 ===
Club	Champions
Chinland FC	3 (2020, 2024, 2025-26)
Chin United	2 (2013, 2019)
Hanthawady United	1 (2014)
Southern Myanmar	1 (2015)
Manawmyay	1 (2016)
City Yangon	1 (2017)
Royal Thanlyin	1 (2018)
University	1 (2022)
Thitsar Arman FC	1 (2023)

=== Myanmar Women's League ===
Club	Champions
Myawady W.F.C	3 (2017, 2018, 2023)
ISPE W.F.C	3 (2019, 2022, 2024–25)
Ayeyawady W.F.C	1 (2025-26)

=== Futsal League ===
Club	Champions
MIU	5 (2014–15, 2016, 2018–19, 2019–20, 2024–25)
Victoria University College Futsal Club	2 (2022, 2023)
ACE	2 (2011, 2012)
Pyay United	1 (2017)

== Top-performing clubs – cup competitions ==
=== General Aung San Shield ===
Club	Champions
Yangon United	3 (2011, 2018, 2019)
Ayeyawady United	3 (2012, 2014, 2015)
Hanthawady United	1 (2010)
Magwe	1 (2016)
Shan United	1 (2017)

=== Charity Cup ===
Club	Champions
Yangon United	3 (2013, 2016, 2018)
Kanbawza/Shan United	3 (2014, 2019, 2020)
Ayeyawady United	2 (2012, 2015)
Magwe	1 (2017)

== AFC Champions League ==
=== Participations ===
Team	Qualified	1997–98	1998–99	2015	2016	2017	2018	2019	2020
Finance and Revenue	2 Times	Q	R16
Yangon United	2 Times				QS			QS
Yadanarbon	2 Times			QS		QS
Shan United	2 Times						QS		QS

QS: Qualifying stage, G: Group round, R16: Round of 16, Q: Quarterfinals, S: Semifinal, R: Runner-up, W: Winner

== AFC Cup ==
=== Participations ===
Team	Qualified	2012	2013	2014	2015	2016	2017	2018	2019	2020	2023
Yangon United	6 Times	G	R16	R16		G		ZS	G
Ayeyawady United	4 Times	G	G		R16	G
Shan United	3 Times							G	G		G
Yadanarbon	2 Times				G		G
Nay Pyi Taw	1 Time			R16
Magwe	1 Time						G

G: Group round, R16: Round 16, ZS: Zonal semi-finals, R: Runner-up, W: Winner

== AFC challenge league ==
Team	Qualified	2023	2024	2025
Yangon United	1 Time			P
Shan United	3 Times	G	G

P: play off, G: Group round, QF: Quarter final, SF: semi-finals, R: Runner-up, W: Winner
