= Team Phoenix =

Team Phoenix may refer to:

- Phoenix Racing (German racing team) (established 1999), German motor racing team
- Team Phoenix F.C. (established 2017), a Burmese football club
