= Pedro Alves (footballer, born 1999) =

Brazilian footballer

Pedrinho
Personal information
- Full name: Pedro Conceição Alves
- Date of birth: 6 January 1999 (age 27)
- Place of birth: Vitória, Brazil
- Height: 5 ft 10 in (1.78 m)
- Position: Midfielder

Youth career
- Inter de Limeira
- Batatais
- Guaraní

Senior career*
Years	Team	Apps	(Gls)
2020	North Texas SC	3	(0)
2021	Independente de Limeira	11	(1)
2024	Prudentópolis	4	(0)
2025–2026	Kasuka	11	(22)
- * Club domestic league appearances and goals as of 27 August 2026

Pedro Conceição Alves (born 6 January 1999) also known as Cuadrado or Pedrinho is a Brazilian professional footballer who plays as a midfielder.

== Career ==
On 14 January 2020, Pedrinho joined USL League One side North Texas SC from Guaraní. He made his debut for the club on 1 August 2020, appearing as an 81st-minute substitute during a 1–0 loss to Union Omaha. On 30 November 2020, Pedrinho was released by North Texas.

On 8 June 2025, Alves was announced by Brunei club Kasuka FC to have signed a contract for the 2025–26 season. He took the number 10 shirt and played as an attacking midfielder on his debut, a 2–1 victory over DH Cebu in the 2025–26 Shopee Cup playoffs first leg on 8 August, assisting Jacob Njoku for the winning goal.

On 20 September 2025, Alves scored a hat-trick in the first fixture of the 2025–26 Brunei Super League for Kasuka, a 1–7 win over Wijaya FC. A week later, he scored four goals against Lun Bawang FC in the second league match for his team. On 31 October, he scored twice against Rimba Star, including one directly from a corner kick.

On 18 January 2026, Alves scored five goals in a 26–1 victory over Hawa FC. His team had a 100% record towards the final game of the season when they faced Indera SC who trailed two points behind them. Although Alves lost the game 2–3 and handed the opposition the championship, he managed to win the Player of the Season award as well as the Top Scorer accolade.

== Honours ==
=== Individual ===
- 2025–26 Brunei Super League Player of the Season
- 2025–26 Brunei Super League Top Scorer
