= Jefri Syafiq Ishak =

Bruneian footballer (born 2002)

Jefri Syafiq
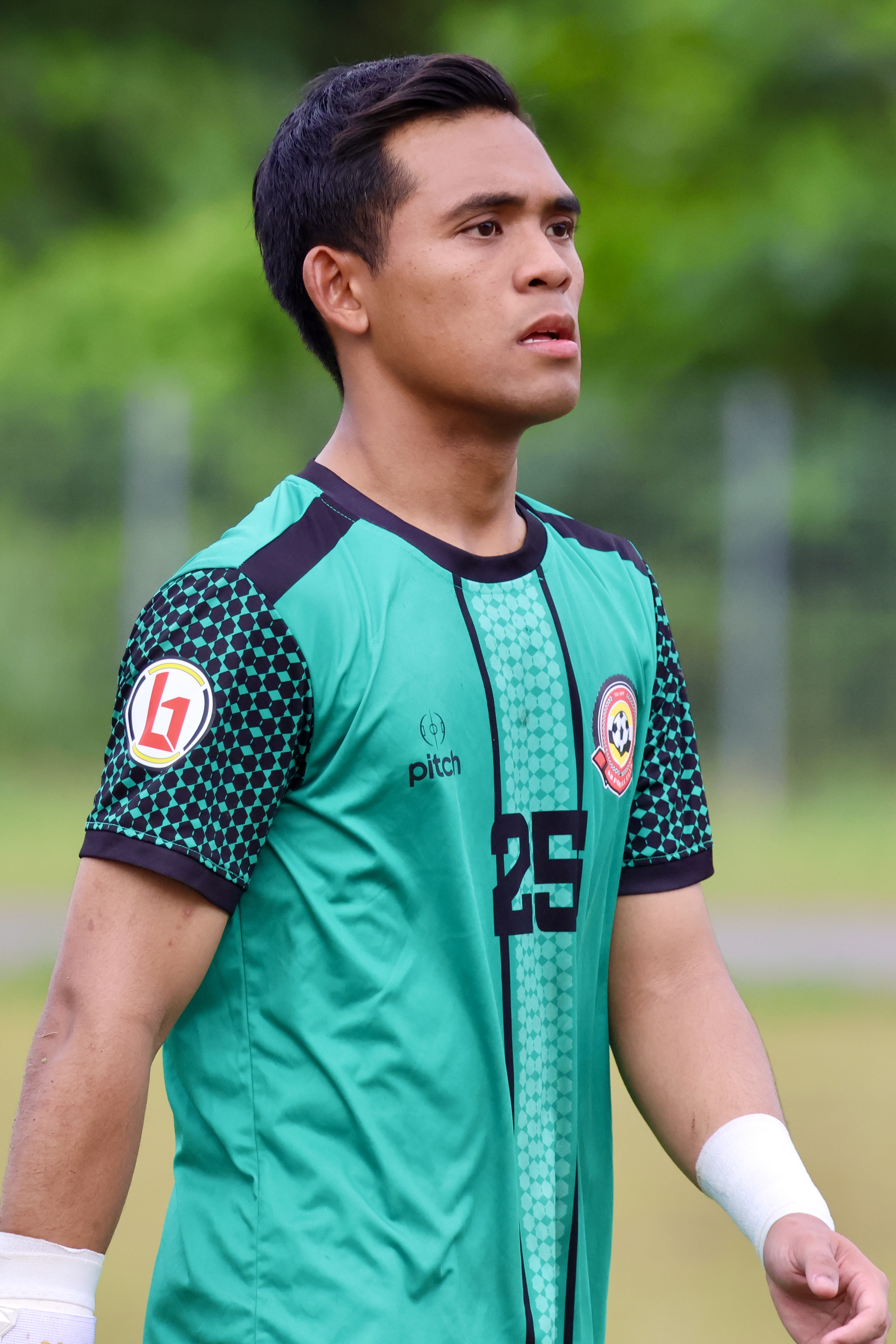
- Jefri with Kuala Belait in 2024

Personal information
- Full name: Muhammad Jefri Syafiq bin Ishak
- Date of birth: 21 May 2002 (age 24)
- Place of birth: Kuala Belait, Brunei
- Height: 1.77 m (5 ft 10 in)
- Position: Goalkeeper

Team information
- Current team: DPMM FC II
- Number: 25

Youth career
- BSRC

Senior career*
Years	Team	Apps	(Gls)
2020–2021	BSRC	3	(0)
2022–2024	Kuala Belait	16	(0)
2025	DPMM II	3	(0)
2025–2026	Kasuka	8	(0)
2026–	DPMM II	3	(0)

International career^{‡}
2023	Brunei U23	7	(0)
2022–	Brunei	1	(0)
- * Club domestic league appearances and goals as of 3 November 2026 ‡ National team caps and goals as of 22 November 2024

Muhammad Jefri Syafiq bin Ishak (born 21 May 2002) is a Bruneian footballer who plays as a goalkeeper for Brunei Super League club DPMM FC II and the Brunei national football team.

== Club career ==
=== Belait teams ===
A native of Kuala Belait in west Brunei, Jefri began playing for the football team of Brunei Shell Recreational Club in the 2020 season, after steady development with their youth team. He made his league debut against Indera SC on 20 June 2021 in a 0–2 loss.

After three league appearances in two incomplete Brunei Super League seasons due to the COVID-19 pandemic, Jefri moved to KB FC of the same district the following year. He made his competitive debut for KB at the 2022 Brunei FA Cup first group match against Tutong Hotspurs in a 1–1 draw on 14 August. He gained rave reviews from onlookers, most importantly the then Brunei national team head coach Mario Rivera, at the tournament where his team was able to advance to the quarter-finals through his performances.

In the 2023 season, Kuala Belait finished sixth out of 16 teams, with Jefri keeping five clean sheets in 12 appearances.

=== DPMM FC II ===
At the start of 2025, Jefri transferred to DPMM FC's second team and played in a training match against Kuching City on 5 January. He made his official debut with the team on the 19th against Jerudong FC, keeping a clean sheet in a 5–0 win. On 2 February, Jefri was the starting goalkeeper for DPMM II's title decider against Kasuka FC, which they lost 2–3. In the following 2025 Brunei FA Cup campaign, he played the majority of the games as a starter including in the final on 18 May when he produced noteworthy saves against the strikeforce of Indera SC to keep a clean sheet and helped the royalty-owned club win their third Brunei FA Cup in a 1–0 win.

=== Kasuka ===
After the disbanding of the DPMM FC second team in the 2025–26 season, Jefri hooked up with local powerhouse club Kasuka FC and was assigned the squad number 25, indicating that Wardun Yussof who played in the regional tournament qualification matches for Kasuka in June has ultimately retired from active play. He made his debut on 20 September 2025 in a 1–7 victory over Wijaya FC. In his first season for Kasuka, he made five clean sheets in eight appearances, winning the Goalkeeper of the Season as his team finished in second place to Indera SC.

== International career ==
=== Youth ===
Jefri became the starting goalkeeper for Brunei at under-23 level in 2023, making the squad to compete at the 2023 AFF U-23 Championship held in Thailand in August of that year. He made his first appearance in a 2–0 loss to Laos in a friendly on 12 August. At the tournament itself, Jefri conceded a ninth minute own goal in the first game against Cambodia, the score ending 0–5. Further defeats incurred by Thailand and Myanmar compounded Brunei to finish bottom of their group.

A month later, almost the same side travelled to Jordan for the 2024 AFC U-23 Asian Cup qualification matches against three formidable Middle Eastern teams. Jefri conceded a total of 23 goals in three matches against the home side, Syria and Oman.

=== Senior ===
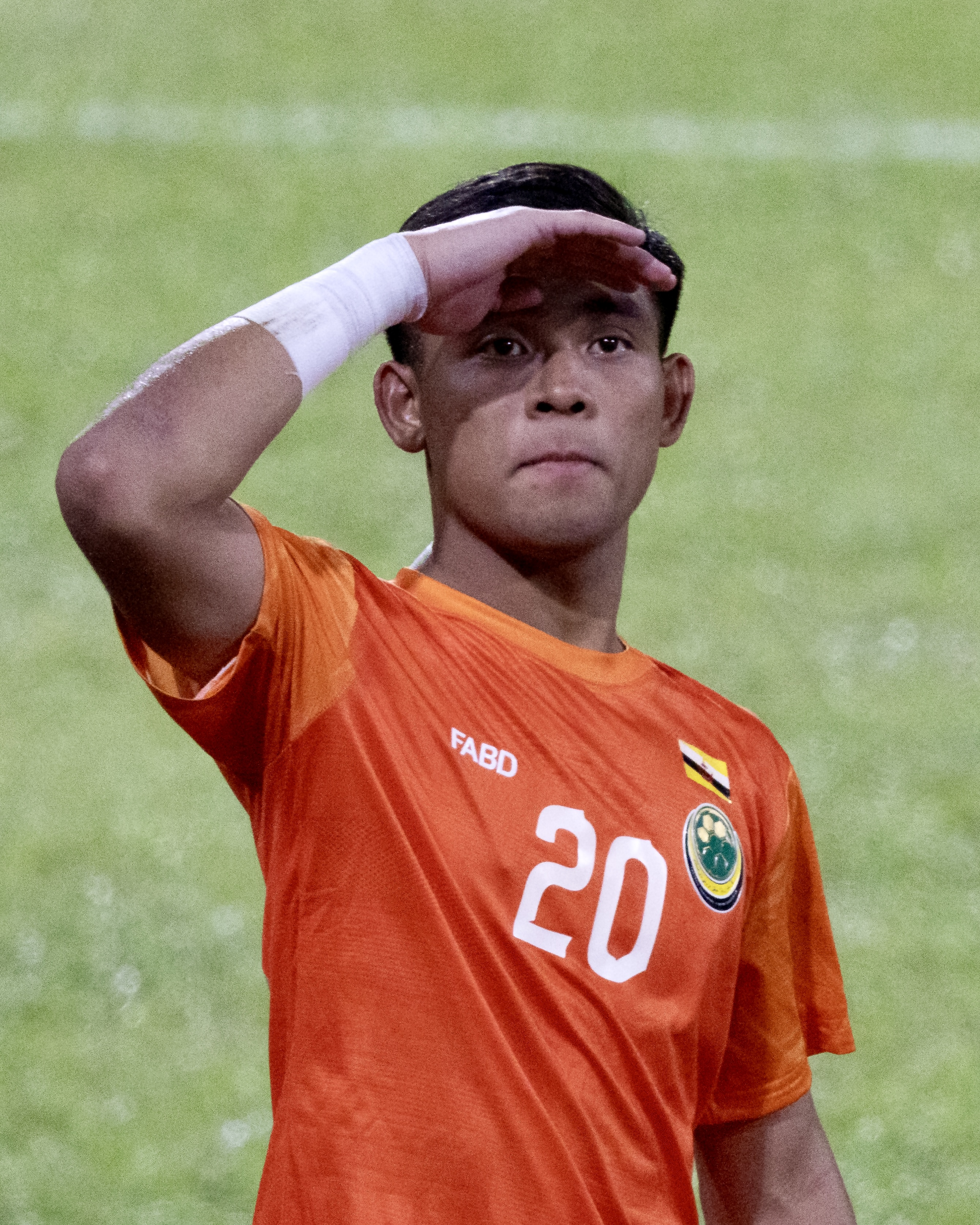
Jefri as a substitute against Indonesia during the 2026 FIFA World Cup qualification

Jefri became a surprise selection for the Brunei national team when the Wasps hosted both Laos and Maldives at a tri-nation tournament in September 2022. However despite consistently being in the national squad ever since, he could not dislodge the two senior goalkeepers Haimie Abdullah Nyaring and Ishyra Asmin Jabidi and he had to wait until 15 November 2024 for his international debut away against Russia in Krasnodar when both players were unavailable for selection. The gulf in class between the two sides was apparent as Jefri was on the wrong end of an 11–0 hammering by the team in red.

Jefri returned to the national team setup in June 2025 against Sri Lanka and Bhutan, but was kept on the bench.

== Honours ==
=== Team ===
DPMM II

- Brunei FA Cup: 2025

=== Individual ===
- 2025–26 Brunei Super League Goalkeeper of the Season
