= Thiha (footballer) =

Burmese footballer

Personal information
- Full name: Thiha
- Date of birth: 25 December 1995 (age 30)
- Place of birth: Hinthada, Myanmar
- Height: 1.73 m (5 ft 8 in)
- Position: Midfielder

Team information
- Current team: Ayeyawady United
- Number: 70

Youth career
- 2014: Ayeyawady United U-19 team

Senior career*
Years	Team	Apps	(Gls)
2015-2016	Dagon		
2017	City Yangon		
2018–2020	Magwe		
2021–2022	Yangon United		
2022–2023	Hanthawaddy United		
2023–	Ayeyawady United		
- * Club domestic league appearances and goals as of 17 Jan 2021

Thiha (Burmese: သီဟ born 25 December 1995) is a Burmese footballer who plays as a midfielder for Yangon United.
