= 2025–26 Brunei Super League =

Current top-flight association football league in Brunei

Brunei Super League
- Season: 2025–26
- Champions: Indera SC
- AFC Challenge League: Kasuka
- Matches: 66
- Goals: 365 (5.53 per match)
- Top goalscorer: Pedro Alves (22 goals)
- Best goalkeeper: Jefri Syafiq Ishak (5 clean sheets)
- Biggest home win: Kasuka 26–1 Hawa (18 January 2026)
- Biggest away win: Hawa 0–19 Kota Ranger (26 October 2025)
- Highest scoring: Kasuka 26–1 Hawa (18 January 2026)

The 2025–26 Brunei Super League was the eleventh season of the Brunei Super League, the top football league in Brunei since its establishment in 2012. The league started on 19 September 2025 and concluded on 19 April 2026.

For the second season in a row, Kelme provides the official match ball.

On 18 January 2026, the defending champions Kasuka FC beat the bottom side Hawa FC by 26 goals to one, producing the competition's highest-scoring match ever.

In the final league game of the season, Indera SC defeated Kasuka 2–3 to become champions for the first time since 2014, winning their third overall Brunei Super League title.

== Teams ==
A total of 12 teams played in this edition of the Brunei Super League. DPMM FC did not enter their second team for this season. AKSE Bersatu and Panchor Murai were also absent, while Hawa FC were invited into the top flight, having won the Belait District League earlier this year.

Club	Head coach	Captain	Kit manufacturer	Shirt sponsor
BSRC FC	(Brunei) Hailmey Ariffin	(Brunei) Hafizul Hasnal	(Brunei) Sports Alliance	
Hawa FC	(Brunei) Abdul Aziz Azahari	(Brunei) Ghazi Ismawi	(Thailand) Lugust	
Indera SC	(Nigeria) Mba Vitus Onyekachi	(Brunei) Abdul Khair Basri	(Malaysia) Forfit	
Jerudong FC	(Brunei) Julkifli Hitam	(Brunei) Ahmad Hafiz Said	(Germany) Adidas	
Kasuka FC	(Brunei) Halimi Abu Bakar	(Brunei) Afi Aminuddin	(Brunei) Kadaba Sports	Chapayom
KB FC	(Brunei) Kambri Rambli	(Brunei) Azizul Syafiee Tajul Ariffin	(Malaysia) Kaki Jersi	Active Tank
Kota Ranger FC	(Brunei) Syarafuddin Hamdi Talip	(Brunei) Abdul Aziz Tamit	(Indonesia) Trops	
Lun Bawang FC	(Brunei) Ah Chua Bangau	(Brunei) Ahwaz Wira Abdullah Ating	(Germany) Adidas	
MS ABDB	(Brunei) Yusof Matyassin	(Brunei) Shafie Effendy	(Brunei) Nueve	
MS PPDB	(Brunei) Edy Asmady Abdul Malik	(Brunei) Fazizzul Hussin	(Brunei) Nueve	
Rimba Star FC	(Nigeria) Felix Obinna	(Brunei) Kurmin Bini	(Indonesia) Kick	Kick Apparel
Wijaya FC	(Brunei) Erni Abdul Hakim	(Brunei) Azhar Saifulbahri	(Thailand) Cadenza	

== League table ==
Pos	Team	Pld	W	D	L	GF	GA	GD	Pts	
1	Indera (C)	11	10	1	0	46	10	+36	31	
2	Kasuka (Q)	11	10	0	1	85	7	+78	30	Qualification for the AFC Challenge League qualifying play-offs and 2025–26 ASEAN Club Championship qualifying play-offs
3	Kota Ranger	11	7	2	2	51	22	+29	23	
4	MS PPDB	11	6	1	4	29	16	+13	19	
5	MS ABDB	11	5	3	3	34	15	+19	18	
6	Rimba Star	11	6	0	5	36	22	+14	18	
7	Kuala Belait	11	5	3	3	27	26	+1	18	
8	Jerudong	11	3	3	5	16	26	−10	12	
9	BSRC	11	4	0	7	13	34	−21	12	
10	Wijaya	11	2	0	9	11	39	−28	6	
11	Lun Bawang	11	1	1	9	12	48	−36	4	
12	Hawa	11	0	0	11	7	102	−95	0	

Source: FABD
Rules for classification: 1) Points; 2) Goal difference; 3) Goals scored; 4) Head-to-head result; 5) Head-to-head goal difference; 6) Head-to-head goals scored.
(C) Champions; (Q) Qualified for the phase indicated

=== Position by round ===
Team ╲ Round	1	2	3	4	5	6	7	8	9	10	11
Indera	4	1	3	2	2	1	2	2	2	2	1
Kasuka	2	2	2	1	1	3	1	1	1	1	2
Kota Ranger	6	6	1	4	3	2	3	3	3	3	3
MS PPDB	5	5	4	3	4	4	4	4	5	5	4
MS ABDB	3	4	6	6	5	5	6	7	6	7	5
Rimba Star	7	8	8	8	8	7	7	6	7	6	6
Kuala Belait	1	3	5	5	6	6	5	5	4	4	7
Jerudong	9	7	7	7	7	8	8	8	8	8	8
BSRC	8	9	10	10	10	11	10	10	10	9	9
Wijaya	11	10	9	9	9	9	9	9	9	10	10
Lun Bawang	10	11	11	11	11	10	11	11	11	11	11
Hawa	12	12	12	12	12	12	12	12	12	12	12

Table Leader

Source: FABD

== Results ==
Home \ Away	BSR	HAW	IND	JER	KAS	KBF	KOT	LUN	MSA	MSP	RIM	WIJ
BSRC		2–1	1–6	3–2	0–5			3–0	0–2	0–3	0–7	
Hawa			0–14	0–1			0–19		1–10	0–5	2–9	
Indera						5–1	2–2			1–0	2–1	3–0
Jerudong			0–3		1–6	2–2		1–1			2–1	
Kasuka		26–1	2–3				6–0	10–0			4–0	
Kuala Belait	2–0	7–0			0–11			4–1	1–1			5–1
Kota Ranger	6–1			5–2		0–0			2–1	3–4	3–2	
Lun Bawang		4–2	1–4				3–6		0–5	0–7		1–3
MS ABDB			2–3	3–3	0–3						6–0	
MS PPDB				2–1	1–5	2–3			0–0		1–3	
Rimba Star						3–2		3–1	3–4			4–1
Wijaya	0–3	4–0		0–1	1–7		1–5			0–4		

Source: Liga Brunei
Legend: Blue = home team win; Yellow = draw; Red = away team win.
For upcoming matches, an "a" indicates there is an article about the rivalry between the two participants.

=== Results by round ===
Team ╲ Round	1	2	3	4	5	6	7	8	9	10	11
BSRC	L	L	L	L	L	L	W	L	W	W	W
Hawa	L	L	L	L	L	L	L	L	L	L	L
Indera	W	W	W	W	W	W	D	W	W	W	W
Jerudong	L	W	L	W	L	L	D	W	D	D	L
Kasuka	W	W	W	W	W	W	W	W	W	W	L
Kuala Belait	W	W	D	D	L	W	D	W	W	L	L
Kota Ranger	W	W	W	D	W	W	D	W	L	W	L
Lun Bawang	L	L	L	L	L	L	L	L	D	L	W
MS ABDB	W	L	D	W	W	L	D	L	W	D	W
MS PPDB	W	W	W	W	W	L	D	L	L	L	W
Rimba Star	L	L	L	L	W	W	W	W	L	W	W
Wijaya	L	L	W	L	L	W	L	L	L	L	L

Source: Liga Brunei

== Top scorers ==
Rank	Player	Team	Goals
1	(Brazil) Pedro Alves	Kasuka	22
2	(Nigeria) Oscar Uchendu	Rimba Star	18
3	(Brunei) Sahfiq Hidayat Sahrizam	Kota Ranger	15
4	(Nigeria) Muhammed Sa'ad	Kota Ranger	12
5	(Brunei) Haziq Naqiuddin Syamra	Kasuka	11
6	(Brunei) Abdul Azim Abdul Rasid	PPDB	8
6	(Brunei) Amin Sisa	Indera	8
6	(Brunei) Azizul Syafiee Tajul Ariffin	KB	8
6	(Brazil) Hugo	Kasuka	8
6	(Liberia) Leon Sullivan Taylor	Indera	8

== Awards ==
Award	Name	Club	Ref
Player of the Season	(Brazil) Pedro Alves	Kasuka	
Top Scorer	(Brazil) Pedro Alves	Kasuka	
Goalkeeper of the Season	(Brunei) Jefri Syafiq Ishak	Kasuka	
Fair Play Award	MS PPDB		
