= List of football clubs in Brunei =

This is a list of football (soccer) clubs in Brunei.

== Malaysia Super League ==
- Duli Pengiran Muda Mahkota (DPMM) FC

== Brunei Super League ==
- Brunei Shell Recreation Club (BSRC) FC
- Duli Pengiran Muda Mahkota (DPMM) FC II
- Hawa FC
- Indera SC
- Jerudong FC
- Kasuka FC
- Kuala Belait FC
- Lun Bawang FC
- Majlis Sukan Angkatan Bersenjata Diraja Brunei (MS ABDB)
- Majlis Sukan Pasukan Polis Diraja Brunei (MS PPDB)
- Panchor Murai FC
- Rimba Star FC
- Wijaya FC

== District Leagues ==
=== Brunei Muara District League ===
- Admirul Red Star FC
- Almerez FA
- Ar Rawda FT
- Dagang FT
- Deno FC
- Miisa United
- MSN United FC
- Perka United FC
- Persatuan Kampong Saba (Perkasa) FC
- Seri Wira FC
- Wondrous FT

=== Belait District League ===
- Alliance FT
- Dahlia FT
- G17 Akhdan FT
- High Revolution (HR) FT
- Liang Lumut Belait ST
- Manggalela FC
- Nelayan FT
- Nelayan Sungai Teraban (NST) FT
- Nusantara FC
- Panaga FC
- PBDB Juniors

=== Tutong District League ===
- Azmainshah FC
- Bang Dalam FC
- TDAFA 24
- Tutong Hotspurs FT
- Persatuan Pemuda-Pemudi Melayu Lamunin (3PML) FC

=== Lela Cheteria League ===
- Gergasi FC
- Penabai Kuala Tutong (PKT) FT
- Supa Strikas FC
- Syarikat Hanifah Abdullah dan Anak-Anak (SHADA) FT

== Other clubs ==
- Kota Ranger FC
- Bank Islam Brunei Darussalam (BIBD) Sports and Recreational Club
- Bolkiah Bersatu
- Dash FC
- Sengkurong FC
- Angkatan Kampong Setia (AKSE) Bersatu
- Bahtera Kemudi Sekawan (BAKES) FC
- Ikatan Kampong Lurong Sekuna-Mulaut Ban 5 (IKLS-MB5) FC
- Setia Perdana FC
- Bamit FC
- Dato Pemancha Saging (DPS) Ukong
- Luang Family Team
- Pakatan Sang Jati Dusun FC
- Perda FC
- PMS FC
- T-Team
- Hoist FT
- Brunei Food Awards (BFA) FC
- Tanoshi FC
- Rainbow FC
- Muara Youth FC
- Majra FC
- Menglait FC
- Let's Go (LG) FC
- FC Phosphor
- Belia Kampong Saba (BESA) FC
- Tabuan Muda
- Gladiators Force FT
- Plan Batu FC
- Samudra FC
- Sewira FC
- Sinar FC
- Telbru FT
- Belabau FC
- Pandan 14
- Najip FC
- Darussalam Soccer Players (DSP) United
- Tunas FC
- Bebuloh FC
- Ikerab FC
- Kilanas FC
- Kilugos FC
- Peseja United
- Savilla FC
- Seri Bolkiah FC
- Sporting Family Team
- Al-Idrus FC
- Bentara United FC
- Pandan FA
- WLF FC
- Great United
- QAF FC
- LLRC FT
- Majra FC

== See also ==
List of NFABD-registered clubs
