= Tanoshi FC =

Coordinates: 4.5904364°N 114.2692260°E

- Nickname(s): Tanoshi FT
- Founded: 2020; 5 years ago
- Coach: Azri
- League: Belait District League
- Website: https://instagram.com/tanoshi.fc
Home colours

Tanoshi FC is a football team from Brunei. Sometimes it is known as Tanoshi FT. The club was founded in 2020.

== History ==
Before the cancellation of the 2020 Belait District League, KB FC was participating in the tournament.

Liang Lumut Belait FC defeated Tanoshi FC during the first round of 2021 Belait District League.

== See also ==
- List of football clubs in Brunei
