= Hawa FC =

- Full name: Hawa Football Club
- Nickname: Hawa FT
- Founded: 2014; 12 years ago
- Ground: various
- Coach: Khairul Hasmi Ali
- League: Brunei Super League
- 2025–26: 12th
- Website: https://instagram.com/hawa_fc
Home colours	Away colours	Third colours

Hawa Football Club or simply Hawa FC is a football team from Brunei, playing in the Brunei Super League. The club was founded in 2014.

== History ==
Hawa FT participated in the 2015 Telbru Futsal Premier League.

Competing for a spot in the Brunei Premier League in 2017, Hawa FT lost out to DSP United in the qualifying round.

Hawa FT participated in the 2019 Belait District League, and went all the way to the semi-final where they were beaten by JDB FT. They finished fourth after losing to Hoist FT in the third-place playoff.

Hawa FC participated in subsequent Belait District League campaigns, finally winning the league in 2022. They also participated in the 2022 Brunei FA Cup the same year, advancing to the Round of 16 where they were knocked out by Panchor Murai FC.

In February 2025, they were announced as winners of the 2023–24 edition of the Belait District League. In doing so, they were entered into the Brunei Super League, the top flight of Brunei football, starting from the 2025–26 season.

On 18 January 2026, Hawa lost to local powerhouse Kasuka FC with the score of 26–1, which became the highest-scoring match in Brunei Super League history.

== Current squad ==
As of 13 September 2026

Note: Flags indicate national team as defined under FIFA eligibility rules; some limited exceptions apply. Players may hold more than one non-FIFA nationality.

No.	Pos.	Nation	Player
1	GK	IDN	Eka Setiawan
2	DF	BRU	Afiq Idris
3	DF	BRU	Amiruddin Mohammad
4	DF	BRU	Zulhelmi Ismawi
5	MF	BRU	Ahmad Azhar Abdul Rahman
6	DF	BRU	Khairul Ariffin Abdul Basheer
7	MF	BRU	Ghazi Ismawi (Captain)
8	MF	BRU	Safiuddin Shah Mahadi
9	FW	BRU	Amni Ali
10	MF	BRU	Wafee Ishak
11	FW	BRU	Shazwan Sifiga
12	FW	BRU	Welther Hing Wil Cheng
13	DF	BRU	Danish Nor Emran
14	MF	IDN	Toni Ardianto

No.	Pos.	Nation	Player
15	DF	BRU	Hairol Akmal Khairuddin Sofian
16	MF	BRU	Hafizul Afif Ariff
17	MF	BRU	Danial Ar-Rafi Ali
18	DF	BRU	Zayadi Muhammad
19	FW	BRU	Benedict Joseph Layang
20	MF	BRU	Fikri Noor
21	FW	BRU	Justin Libau
22	DF	IDN	Alvin Kusnanda
23	MF	IDN	Dyas Angga Kurniawan
24	MF	BRU	Ahmad Ikhwan Ibrahim
25	GK	BRU	Ahmad Izzuddin Zulkifli
30	GK	BRU	Wafi Ishamuddin Abdullah Sani
31	DF	BRU	Abdul Aziz Yasin

== Honours ==
- Belait District League (2): 2022, 2023–24

== See also ==
- List of football clubs in Brunei
