= Maha Thiha Thura (disambiguation) =

Maha Thiha Thura (Burmese: မဟာသီဟသူရ; also spelled Maha Thihathura) is one of the most prestigious feudal era titles assumed by Burmese royalty or granted to highest ranking generals and ministers. The most famous person to wear the title is the Konbaung-era general who defeated Manchu Qing invasions of Burma (1765–1769) but the title may also mean:

== Royalty ==
- King Thihathu: Co-founder of Myinsaing Kingdom (r. 1298–1312) and founder of Pinya Kingdom (r. 1312–1324)
- King Thihathu of Ava: King of Ava (r. 1422–1426)
- King Narapati of Ava: King of Ava (r. 1443–1469)
- King Thihathura of Ava: King of Ava (r. 1469–1481)
- King Thihathura II of Ava: Joint-King of Ava (r. 1487–1502)
- King Nyaungyan: King of Burma (r. 1599–1606)
- Crown Prince Thado Minsaw: Crown Prince of Burma (r. 1783–1808)

== Generals and ministers ==
- Gen. Maha Thiha Thura (d. 1782): Konbaung-era general
- Myawaddy Mingyi U Sa (1766–1853): Konbaung-era poet, playwright composer, military commander, statesman
