= Team Phoenix F.C. =

Team Phoenix FC
- Full name: Team Phoenix Football Club
- Nickname: The Phoenix
- Founded: 2017; 8 years ago
- Owner: MFF
- League: MNL-2

Team Phoenix Football Club (Burmese: ဖီးနစ် ဘောလုံးအသင်း) is a Burmese football club, founded in 2017. This is the first time MNL-2 season of Team Phoenix FC.

== Current squad ==
As of 2017

Note: Flags indicate national team as defined under FIFA eligibility rules; some limited exceptions apply. Players may hold more than one non-FIFA nationality.

No.	Pos.	Nation	Player
1	GK	MYA	Tun Nanda Oo
2	DF	MYA	Thet Paing Htwe
3	DF	MYA	Sithu Moe Khant
4	DF	MYA	Soe Moe Kyaw
5	DF	MYA	Zwe Khant Min
6	MF	MYA	Thet Paing Htoo
7	FW	MYA	Lwin Moe Aung
8	MF	MYA	Thant Zin Myint
9	MF	MYA	Pyae SOne Naing
10	FW	MYA	Win Naing Tun
11	MF	MYA	Aung Moe Thu
12	MF	MYA	Naing Ko Ko
13	DF	MYA	Thu Ya San

No.	Pos.	Nation	Player
14	DF	MYA	Kyaw Phyoe Wai
15	DF	MYA	Pyae Phyo Mang
16	DF	MYA	Hein Htet Sithu
17	FW	MYA	Hein Hte Aung
18	GK	MYA	Aung Myint Myat
19	DF	MYA	Nay Myo Tun
20	FW	MYA	Dwe Ko Ko
21	MF	MYA	Zaw Myint Myat
22	GK	MYA	Han Naing Soe
23	MF	MYA	Myat Kaung Khant
24	MF	MYA	Ba Nyar Hein
25	FW	MYA	Ye Yint Aung
26	MF	MYA	Lwin Myo
