= Kuala Belait FC =

Bruneian football club

Kuala Belait
- Full name: Kuala Belait Football Club
- Founded: 2019; 7 years ago
- Ground: Arena Sports Complex
- Owner: Abdul Ishak Amirul Islam
- Chairman: Hafiz Nordin Abdul Ishak
- Head coach: Syazwan Othman
- League: Brunei Super League
- 2025–26: 7th
Home colours	Away colours

Kuala Belait Football Club (Malay: Kelab Bola Sepak Kuala Belait; abbrev: KB FC) is a Bruneian professional football club based in Kuala Belait, that competes in the Brunei Super League.

== History ==
The KB FC club has created a winning record in the competition since the Belait District Football Association established the Belait District League in 2019. Their coach Kambri claimed in an interview that all of the team's young players had a great deal of potential for advancement and a strong desire to compete in the Brunei League. They successfully made its debut in the Belait District League thanks to the encouragement and support of the general public, particularly the Football Association of Brunei Darussalam (FABD). They are presently engaged in demanding training at the Mumong Sports Complex.

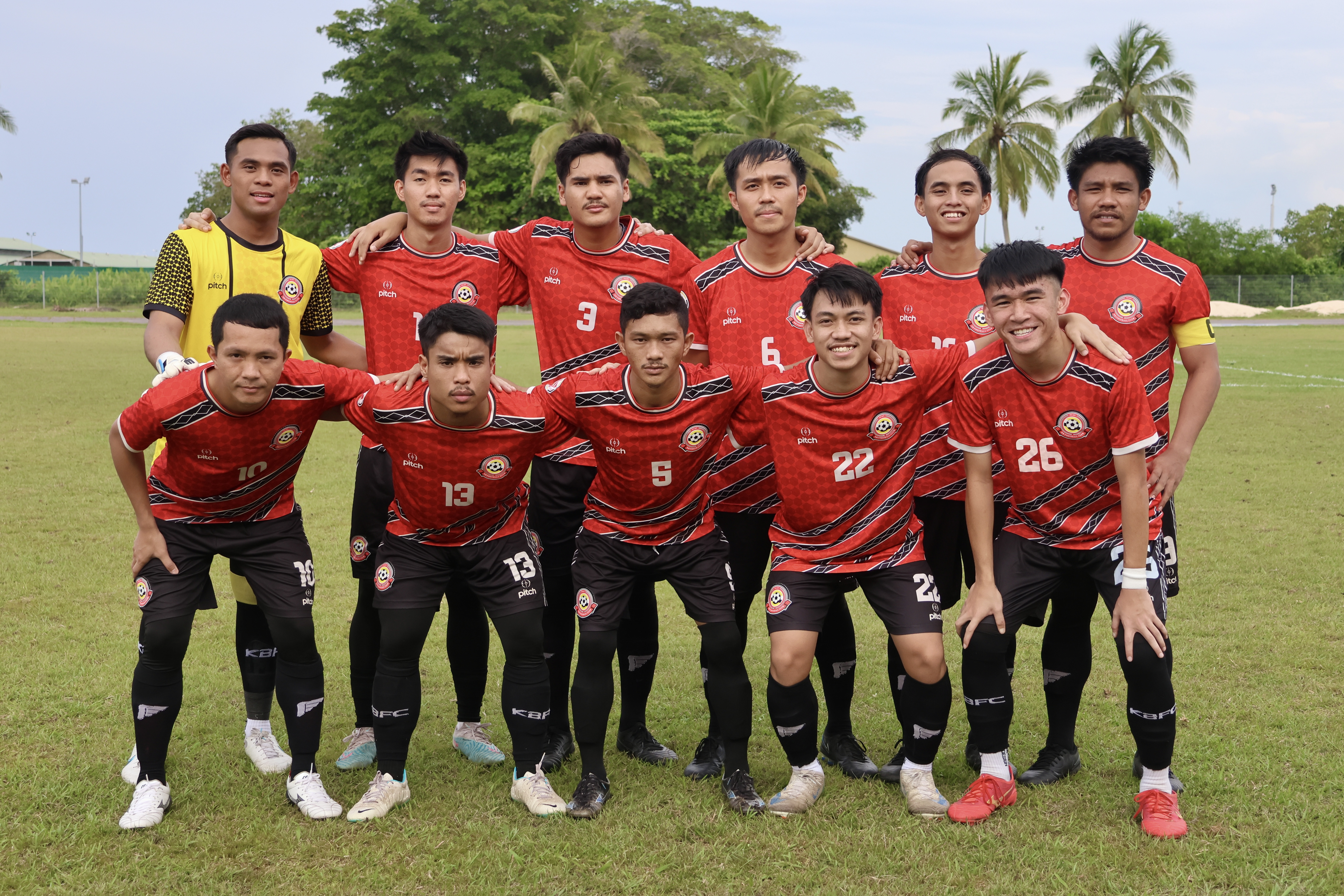
KB starting line-up during the 2024–25 Brunei Super League match against Wijaya FC

In order to take part in the Brunei League tournament for the first time, Kambri wants his team to look for the greatest opportunity and keep trying. He claims that the majority of the KB FC players come from other football clubs and have previous experience playing in matches at the national level. They qualified for Group A after a victory against KB Warriors with the score 3–2. They gained promotion to the 2020 Brunei Super League but it was later cancelled due to the COVID-19 pandemic. They also participated in the 2021 Brunei Super League which was also cut short due to the same predicament.

== Current squad ==
As of 8 January 2026

Note: Flags indicate national team as defined under FIFA eligibility rules; some limited exceptions apply. Players may hold more than one non-FIFA nationality.

No.	Pos.	Nation	Player
1	GK	BRU	Rawandi Abdul Salam
2	DF	BRU	Akmal Zakwan Azmi
4	DF	BRU	Zulhusni Ismawi
5	DF	BRU	Norhamizan Aji
6	DF	BRU	Shahrul Izzan Shahfree
7	FW	BRU	Brian Lim Yong Song
8	MF	BRU	Khairan Zikry Zulkhairi
9	FW	BRU	Azizul Syafiee Tajul Ariffin (captain)
10	MF	BRU	Haikal Zaidi
11	MF	BRU	Hafiy Benny Boey
12	MF	BRU	Abdul Hafiy Herman
13	DF	BRU	Amir Safwan Salamat
14	MF	BRU	Nur Hazwan Khan Asmah Khan
15	FW	BRU	Abu Dzar Zaidi
16	DF	BRU	Melvin Nyambong

No.	Pos.	Nation	Player
17	MF	BRU	Abee Shahrum Gudang
18	DF	BRU	Shazarain Mardani
19	FW	BRU	Azizul Amani Zakaria
20	GK	BRU	Hafiz Ikhwan Hasmali
21	MF	BRU	Danish Bazli Sumardy
22	DF	BRU	Nazirul Faiq Adeni
23	MF	BRU	Rayyan Nadeem Roslan
24	GK	BRU	Firman Taufik Nugraha
25	MF	BRU	Haziq Ali
26	DF	BRU	Zharif Ramli
27	FW	BRU	Amirul Hamrey Norshaney
28	DF	BRU	Nur Hazwan Hamzah
29	MF	BRU	Irsyad Khan Jeffery
30	MF	BRU	Muizzuddin Bujang

== Honours ==
- Belait District League
  - Champions (1): 2019

== See also ==
- List of football clubs in Brunei
