= Silver Stars F.C. =

Silver Star
- Full name: Silver Star Football Club
- Founded: 1989; 37 years ago
- Ground: Various
- Head coach: U Myint Swe
- League: MNL-2

Silver Star Football Club is a Burmese professional football club founded in 1989.

== Squad (2023) ==
Note: Flags indicate national team as defined under FIFA eligibility rules; some limited exceptions apply. Players may hold more than one non-FIFA nationality.

| No. | Pos. | Nation | Player |
|---|---|---|---|
| 1 | GK | MYA | Kaung Myat Kyaw |
| 2 | DF | MYA | Mg Mg Aung |
| 3 | DF | MYA | Kyaw Wai Hlaing |
| 4 | DF | MYA | Hein Htet Aung |
| 7 | DF | MYA | Aung Myo Thuya |
| 8 | MF | MYA | Okkar Soe |
| 10 | FW | MYA | Kyaw Phyo Oo |
| 24 | FW | MYA | Sai Thar Nyi |
| 26 | MF | MYA | Thet Thet wai Tun |
| 2 | DF | MYA | Myat Lin Htet |

| No. | Pos. | Nation | Player |
|---|---|---|---|
| 5 | MF | MYA | Myo Min Oo |
| 6 | DF | MYA | Wunna Zaw |
| 14 | DF | MYA | Chit Ko Ko |
| 24 | GK | MYA | Hmime Htet Wai |
| 15 | MF | MYA | Wine Htet Paung |
| 16 | DF | MYA | Nay Myo Aung |
| 17 | FW | MYA | Htet Akkar |
| 20 | DF | MYA | Swan Yi Htet |
| 25 | MF | MYA | Ye Yint Sithu |
