= Royal Thanlyin F.C. =

Royal Thanlyin FC ေတာ္၀င္သန္လ်င္ ဘောလုံးအသင်း
- Full name: Royal Thanlyin Football Club
- Founded: 2015; 10 years ago
- Ground: Thiha Deepa Stadium
- Capacity: 1,500
- Manager: U Kyi Aye
- League: MNL-2
- 2018: MNL-2, 1st

Royal Thanlyin Football Club (Burmese: ေတာ္၀င္သန္လ်င္ ဘောလုံးအသင်း) was a Burmese football club founded in 2015. City Stars FC changed their name to Royal Thanlyin and based in Thanlyin, Yangon.
