= City Yangon F.C. =

Football club in Myanmar

City Yangon
- Full name: City Yangon Football Club
- Nickname: The Eagle
- Founded: 2012; 14 years ago
- Dissolved: 2017; 9 years ago
- Ground: Horizon Stadium
- Capacity: 30,000
- 2016: MNL, 12th

City Yangon Football Club was a Myanmar football club founded in 2012 by Omer Celik. At the end of the 2016 Myanmar National League, they were relegated to the MNL-2. Horizon name changed to City Yangon. The team has been dissolved after the 2017 MNL-2 season due to financial difficulty.
