= Mawyawadi F.C. =

Burmese football club

Mawyawadi FC မောရဝတီ ဘောလုံးအသင်း
- Full name: Mawyawadi Football Club
- Founded: 2012; 14 years ago
- Manager: U Phone Naing
- League: MNL-2
- 2023: 9th
- Website: www.mawyawadifc.com

Mawyawadi Football Club (Burmese: မောရဝတီ ဘောလုံးအသင်း) is a Burmese football club, founded in 2012.

== 2023 Current squad ==
As of July 2023

Note: Flags indicate national team as defined under FIFA eligibility rules; some limited exceptions apply. Players may hold more than one non-FIFA nationality.

No.	Pos.	Nation	Player
1	GK	MYA	Khin Zaw
2	DF	MYA	Kyaw Chue
3	DF	MYA	Wai Yan Myo
5	DF	MYA	Kyaw Kyaw Tun
6	DF	MYA	Kyaw Htet Lin
7	DF	MYA	Myo Set Naing
8	FW	MYA	Thant Zin Aung
9	MF	MYA	Aung Ko Ko
10	FW	MYA	Naing Lin Tun
11	MF	MYA	Aung Min Htet
12	MF	MYA	Thurein Moe
14	MF	MYA	Phoe Thar

No.	Pos.	Nation	Player
15	FW	MYA	Pyae Sone Aung
16	DF	MYA	Zin Min Thant (Captain)
19	MF	MYA	Min Khant Thein
20	FW	MYA	Zaw Win Thein
22	DF	MYA	Hein Ko Zin
23	FW	MYA	Sai Lin Soe
24	DF	MYA	Aye Min Tun
31	GK	MYA	Htoo Kyaw
33	MF	MYA	Thet Wai Htoo
63	MF	MYA	Kyaw Zayya
97	MF	MYA	Tun Wai Moe
