= 2026 ASEAN Championship squads =

Association football competition squads

Below are the squads for the 2026 ASEAN Championship, which took place between 24 July and 26 August 2026.

Ten national teams affiliated with ASEAN Football Federation (AFF) and participating in this tournament were required to register a squad containing up to 26 players, including three goalkeepers. Only the players from the following squad list were allowed to appear in this tournament. Since the 2022 AFF Championship, each player shirt number was compulsory to use from 1 to 26, which followed the standard of the Asian Football Confederation (AFC).

The age listed is the age of each player on 24 July 2026, the first day of the tournament. The number of appearances and goals listed for each player does not include the match played after the start of the 2026 ASEAN Championship. The club listed is the last club where the player concerned plays a competitive match before the tournament. Fold flag for each club according to the State Football Association (not league) the club is affiliated.

In the event that a player on the submitted squad list suffered from an injury or illness prior to his team's first match of the tournament, that player could be replaced, provided that the team doctor and a doctor from the AFF both confirmed that the injury or illness was severe enough to prevent the player from participating in the tournament. Should a goalkeeper have suffered from an injury or illness after his team's first match of the tournament, he could still be replaced, even if the other goalkeepers from the squad were still available. A player who had been replaced on the player list could not be readmitted to the list.

== Group A ==
=== Cambodia ===
Cambodia announced their final squad, containing 24 players rather than the allowed 26, on 7 July 2026. The squad was extended to 26 players as Iago Bento and Hikaru Mizuno joined the squad on 18 July and 22 July, respectively. Taing Bunchhai withdrew injured on 23 July and was replaced by Im Vakhim.

Head coach: (Japan) Koji Gyotoku

No.	Pos.	Player	Date of birth (age)	Caps	Goals	Club
1	GK	Koy Salim	10 December 2002 (aged 23)	0	0	(Football Federation of Cambodia) Boeung Ket
2	DF	Vann Vit	13 October 2003 (aged 22)	0	0	(Football Federation of Cambodia) Life Sihanoukville
3	DF	Sophal Dimong	4 March 2001 (aged 25)	2	1	(Football Federation of Cambodia) PKR Svay Rieng
4	MF	Alisher Mirzaev	11 April 1996 (aged 30)	1	0	(Football Federation of Cambodia) MOI Kompong Dewa
5	DF	Hikaru Mizuno	2 August 1991 (aged 34)	8	0	(Football Federation of Cambodia) National Defense Ministry
6	MF	Yudai Ogawa	4 October 1996 (aged 29)	19	2	(Football Federation of Cambodia) PKR Svay Rieng
7	MF	Iago Bento	15 January 1999 (aged 27)	0	0	(Football Federation of Cambodia) Boeung Ket
8	MF	Bong Samuel	25 September 2005 (aged 20)	6	1	(Football Federation of Cambodia) Phnom Penh Crown
9	FW	Sieng Chanthea	9 September 2002 (aged 23)	46	9	(Football Federation of Cambodia) PKR Svay Rieng
10	FW	Mat Noron	17 June 1998 (aged 28)	14	0	(Football Federation of Cambodia) Boeung Ket
11	FW	Mon Rado	27 January 2004 (aged 22)	2	1	(Football Federation of Cambodia) MOI Kompong Dewa
12	MF	Sos Suhana	4 April 1992 (aged 34)	80	4	(Football Federation of Cambodia) Nagaworld
13	DF	Nu Chenmakara	1 May 2002 (aged 24)	0	0	(Football Federation of Cambodia) Angkor Tiger
14	FW	Hav Soknet	3 August 2003 (aged 22)	6	1	(Football Federation of Cambodia) Visakha
15	DF	Tum Makara	25 January 2006 (aged 20)	0	0	(Football Federation of Cambodia) Angkor Tiger
16	FW	Yem Devit	3 November 2003 (aged 22)	2	0	(Football Federation of Cambodia) Phnom Penh Crown
17	FW	Sa Ty	4 April 2002 (aged 24)	22	2	(Football Federation of Cambodia) Phnom Penh Crown
18	DF	Ouk Sovann	15 May 1998 (aged 28)	18	0	(Football Federation of Cambodia) Visakha
19	DF	Phat Sokha	2 March 2003 (aged 23)	2	0	(Football Federation of Cambodia) Nagaworld
20	FW	Abdel Kader Coulibaly	18 June 1993 (aged 33)	8	3	(Football Federation of Cambodia) Angkor Tiger
21	GK	Reth Lyheng	1 January 2004 (aged 22)	2	0	(Football Federation of Cambodia) Nagaworld
22	GK	Hul Kimhuy (captain)	7 April 2000 (aged 26)	20	0	(Football Federation of Cambodia) ISI Dangkor Senchey
23	MF	Sin Sovannmakara	6 December 2004 (aged 21)	7	0	(Football Federation of Cambodia) Visakha
24	DF	Im Vakhim	28 November 2003 (aged 22)	1	0	(Football Federation of Cambodia) Angkor Tiger
25	FW	Mon Vanda	18 October 1997 (aged 28)	0	0	(Football Federation of Cambodia) MOI Kompong Dewa
26	DF	Chea Sokmeng	26 November 2002 (aged 23)	0	0	(Football Federation of Cambodia) Nagaworld

=== Indonesia ===
Indonesia announced their 50-man preliminary squad on 7 July 2026. The final squad was announced on 24 July.

Head coach: (England) John Herdman

No.	Pos.	Player	Date of birth (age)	Caps	Goals	Club
1	GK	Nadeo Argawinata	9 March 1997 (aged 29)	24	0	(Football Association of Indonesia) Borneo Samarinda
2	DF	Brian Fatari	20 December 1999 (aged 26)	0	0	(Football Association of Indonesia) Dewa United Banten
3	DF	Wahyu Prasetyo	21 March 1998 (aged 28)	3	0	(Football Association of Indonesia) Dewa United Banten
4	DF	Jordi Amat	21 March 1992 (aged 34)	23	2	(Football Association of Indonesia) Persija Jakarta
5	DF	Rizky Ridho (captain)	21 November 2001 (aged 24)	54	4	(Football Association of Indonesia) Persija Jakarta
6	DF	Sandy Walsh	14 March 1995 (aged 31)	24	3	(Football Association of Thailand) Buriram United
7	MF	Marselino Ferdinan	9 September 2004 (aged 21)	41	5	(Slovak Football Association) Trenčín
8	MF	Kadek Agung	25 June 1998 (aged 28)	10	1	(Football Association of Indonesia) Bali United
9	FW	Mitchell Baker	11 December 2006 (aged 19)	0	0	(United States Soccer Federation) Vermont Green
10	FW	Egy Maulana Vikri	7 July 2000 (aged 26)	33	9	(Football Association of Indonesia) Dewa United Banten
11	FW	Ragnar Oratmangoen	21 January 1998 (aged 28)	17	3	(Royal Belgian Football Association) Dender
12	GK	Cahya Supriadi	11 February 2003 (aged 23)	3	0	(Football Association of Indonesia) PSIM Yogyakarta
13	MF	Beckham Putra	29 October 2001 (aged 24)	8	2	(Football Association of Indonesia) Persib Bandung
14	MF	Eliano Reijnders	23 October 2000 (aged 25)	9	1	(Football Association of Indonesia) Persib Bandung
15	MF	Saddil Ramdani	2 January 1999 (aged 27)	29	2	(Football Association of Indonesia) Persib Bandung
16	DF	Dony Tri Pamungkas	11 January 2005 (aged 21)	8	0	(Football Association of Indonesia) Persija Jakarta
17	FW	Rizky Eka Pratama	24 December 1999 (aged 26)	0	0	(Football Association of Indonesia) PSM Makassar
18	MF	Ivar Jenner	10 January 2004 (aged 22)	25	0	(Football Association of Indonesia) Dewa United Banten
19	MF	Thom Haye	9 February 1995 (aged 31)	18	2	(Football Association of Indonesia) Persib Bandung
20	DF	Shayne Pattynama	11 August 1998 (aged 27)	13	1	(Football Association of Indonesia) Persija Jakarta
21	MF	Rayhan Hannan	2 April 2004 (aged 22)	4	0	(Football Association of Indonesia) Persija Jakarta
22	GK	Muhammad Riyandi	3 January 2000 (aged 26)	5	0	(Football Association of Indonesia) Persis Solo
23	MF	Marc Klok	20 April 1993 (aged 33)	23	5	(Football Association of Indonesia) Persib Bandung
24	FW	Jens Raven	12 October 2005 (aged 20)	0	0	(Football Association of Indonesia) Bali United
25	DF	Justin Hubner	14 September 2003 (aged 22)	21	1	(Royal Dutch Football Association) Fortuna Sittard
26	DF	Tim Geypens	21 June 2005 (aged 21)	0	0	(Royal Dutch Football Association) Emmen

=== Singapore ===
Singapore announced their 24-man preliminary squad on 18 June 2026. Harhys Stewart was added to the squad on 27 June, extending the list to 25 players. Irfan Najeeb withdrew injured and was replaced by Akram Azman on 3 July. Rudy Khairullah withdrew injured and was replaced by Ridhuan Barudin on 20 July. At the same day, the final squad was announced, containing 25 players rather than the allowed 26.

Head coach: Gavin Lee

No.	Pos.	Player	Date of birth (age)	Caps	Goals	Club
1	GK	Izwan Mahbud	14 July 1990 (aged 36)	74	0	(Football Association of Singapore) Young Lions
2	DF	Akram Azman	21 November 2000 (aged 25)	3	0	(Football Association of Singapore) Lion City Sailors
3	DF	Ryhan Stewart	15 February 2000 (aged 26)	34	0	(Football Association of Thailand) Kanchanaburi Power
4	MF	Saifullah Akbar	31 January 1999 (aged 27)	5	0	(Football Association of Singapore) Hougang United
5	DF	Amirul Adli	13 January 1996 (aged 30)	42	1	(Football Association of Malaysia) Negeri Sembilan
6	MF	Kyoga Nakamura	25 April 1996 (aged 30)	20	2	(Football Association of Singapore) Lion City Sailors
7	MF	Song Ui-young	8 November 1993 (aged 32)	34	8	(Football Association of Singapore) Lion City Sailors
8	MF	Shah Shahiran	14 November 1999 (aged 26)	41	1	(Football Association of Singapore) Tampines Rovers
9	MF	Nathan Mao	26 March 2008 (aged 18)	2	0	(Football Association of Singapore) Young Lions
10	MF	Farhan Zulkifli	10 November 2002 (aged 23)	11	1	(Football Association of Singapore) Lion City Sailors
11	MF	Glenn Kweh	26 March 2000 (aged 26)	31	2	(Football Association of Singapore) Tampines Rovers
12	GK	Syazwan Buhari	22 September 1992 (aged 33)	4	0	(Football Association of Singapore) Tampines Rovers
13	MF	Harhys Stewart	20 March 2001 (aged 25)	17	1	(Football Association of Thailand) Uthai Thani
14	DF	Hariss Harun (captain)	19 November 1990 (aged 35)	149	11	(Football Association of Singapore) Lion City Sailors
15	DF	Lionel Tan	5 June 1997 (aged 29)	28	3	(Football Association of Singapore) Lion City Sailors
16	MF	Hami Syahin	16 December 1998 (aged 27)	41	0	(Football Association of Singapore) Lion City Sailors
17	DF	Irfan Fandi	13 August 1997 (aged 28)	52	2	(Football Association of Thailand) Port
18	MF	Jacob Mahler	10 April 2000 (aged 26)	17	3	(Football Association of Singapore) Tampines Rovers
19	FW	Ilhan Fandi	8 November 2002 (aged 23)	25	6	(Football Association of Thailand) Buriram United
20	FW	Shawal Anuar	29 April 1991 (aged 35)	52	19	(Football Association of Singapore) Lion City Sailors
21	DF	Raoul Suhaimi	18 September 2005 (aged 20)	0	0	(Football Association of Singapore) Tampines Rovers
22	MF	Joel Chew	9 February 2000 (aged 26)	9	0	(Football Association of Singapore) Tampines Rovers
23	GK	Ridhuan Barudin	23 March 1987 (aged 39)	0	0	(Football Association of Singapore) Hougang United
24	DF	Luth Harith	19 March 2008 (aged 18)	0	0	(Football Association of Singapore) Young Lions
26	DF	Nur Adam Abdullah	13 April 2001 (aged 25)	13	0	(Football Association of Singapore) Lion City Sailors

=== Timor-Leste ===
Timor-Leste announced their final squad on 29 June 2026.

Head coach: (Portugal) Zé Pedro

No.	Pos.	Player	Date of birth (age)	Caps	Goals	Club
1	GK	Dylan Niski	3 January 2000 (aged 26)	4	0	(Football Australia) Western City Rangers
2	DF	Jackson Fowler	3 September 2004 (aged 21)	3	0	(Football Australia) Valentine
3	DF	Eric Silva	10 July 2002 (aged 24)	2	0	(Portuguese Football Federation) Sesimbra
4	DF	Anizo Correia	23 May 2003 (aged 23)	24	0	(East Timor Football Federation) AD Santo António
5	DF	Juvito Moniz	8 December 2003 (aged 22)	2	0	(East Timor Football Federation) Santa Cruz
6	DF	João Varudo	6 June 1992 (aged 34)	0	0	(Portuguese Football Federation) Sintrense
7	FW	Luís Figo	17 April 2005 (aged 21)	11	0	(East Timor Football Federation) AD Santo António
8	MF	Claudio Osorio	26 September 2002 (aged 23)	16	1	(Football Association of Ireland) Cobh Ramblers
9	FW	João Rangel	17 July 2001 (aged 25)	5	2	(The Football Association) Leiston
10	FW	João Pedro	24 June 1998 (aged 28)	28	8	(Football Association of Malaysia) Kuching City
11	FW	Zenivio (captain)	22 April 2005 (aged 21)	24	2	(Football Association of Singapore) Tanjong Pagar United
12	GK	Alexandre Lima	3 November 2005 (aged 20)	0	0	(East Timor Football Federation) Santa Cruz
13	MF	Tristan Arrarte	26 July 2008 (aged 17)	3	0	(Football Australia) Western Sydney Wanderers
14	FW	Zion Cruz	18 April 2001 (aged 25)	5	1	(Portuguese Football Federation) Lusitano FCV
15	MF	Palomito Ribeiro	14 June 2005 (aged 21)	0	0	(East Timor Football Federation) AD Santo António
16	DF	Ryan Jom	3 March 2005 (aged 21)	4	0	(Football Australia) Canterbury Bankstown
17	DF	Liam Farrugia	13 January 2003 (aged 23)	4	0	(Football Australia) Manningham United
18	FW	Olagar Xavier	18 May 2003 (aged 23)	16	1	(East Timor Football Federation) AD Santo Anttónio
19	FW	Alexandro Bakhito	1 June 2006 (aged 20)	8	1	(East Timor Football Federation) Karketu Dili
20	GK	Egidio Luro	5 December 2008 (aged 17)	0	0	(East Timor Football Federation) Karketu Dili
21	FW	Angenucu Viegas	22 July 2003 (aged 23)	0	0	(East Timor Football Federation) Karketu Dili
22	FW	Vabio Canavaro	25 January 2007 (aged 19)	4	0	(East Timor Football Federation) SLB Laulara
23	FW	Oatnasio da Silva	11 June 2006 (aged 20)	2	2	(Irish Football Association) Portadown
24	MF	Natalino da Costa	3 August 2003 (aged 22)	1	0	(East Timor Football Federation) Karketu Dili
25	FW	Paulo Gusmão	24 August 2003 (aged 22)	0	0	(East Timor Football Federation) Santa Cruz
26	MF	Denilson Almeida	15 August 2008 (aged 17)	0	0	(East Timor Football Federation) Coração

=== Vietnam ===
Vietnam announced their 28-man preliminary squad on 15 June 2026. The squad was reduced to 27 players on 28 June after Khoa Ngo withdrew due to injury, then to 26 on 14 July following the withdrawal of Lê Ngọc Bảo, and to 25 on 15 July after Đỗ Duy Mạnh also withdrew injured. On 17 July, Khuất Văn Khang wihdrew injured and was replaced by Khổng Minh Gia Bảo. The final squad was announced on 24 July, containing 25 players rather than the allowed 26.

Head coach: (South Korea) Kim Sang-sik

No.	Pos.	Player	Date of birth (age)	Caps	Goals	Club
1	GK	Lê Giang Patrik	8 September 1992 (aged 33)	1	0	(Vietnam Football Federation) Cong An Ho Chi Minh City
3	DF	Nguyễn Văn Vĩ	12 February 1998 (aged 28)	17	5	(Vietnam Football Federation) Thep Xanh Nam Dinh
4	DF	Đinh Quang Kiệt	16 July 2007 (aged 19)	0	0	(Vietnam Football Federation) Hoang Anh Gia Lai
5	DF	Đoàn Văn Hậu	19 April 1999 (aged 27)	40	2	(Vietnam Football Federation) Cong An Hanoi
6	DF	Nguyễn Nhật Minh	27 July 2003 (aged 22)	2	0	(Vietnam Football Federation) Haiphong
7	DF	Phạm Xuân Mạnh	27 March 1996 (aged 30)	26	3	(Vietnam Football Federation) Hanoi FC
8	MF	Lê Phạm Thành Long	5 June 1996 (aged 30)	14	0	(Vietnam Football Federation) Cong An Hanoi
9	FW	Nguyễn Đình Bắc	19 August 2004 (aged 21)	14	3	(Vietnam Football Federation) Cong An Hanoi
10	MF	Đỗ Hoàng Hên	16 May 1994 (aged 32)	3	1	(Vietnam Football Federation) Hanoi FC
11	DF	Khổng Minh Gia Bảo	26 July 2000 (aged 25)	0	0	(Vietnam Football Federation) Cong An Ho Chi Minh City
12	FW	Nguyễn Xuân Son	30 March 1997 (aged 29)	9	11	(Vietnam Football Federation) Thep Xanh Nam Dinh
13	FW	Nguyễn Tài Lộc	14 April 1994 (aged 32)	1	0	(Vietnam Football Federation) Ninh Binh
14	MF	Nguyễn Hoàng Đức	11 January 1998 (aged 28)	57	2	(Vietnam Football Federation) Ninh Binh
15	DF	Trương Tiến Anh	25 April 1999 (aged 27)	21	1	(Vietnam Football Federation) Ninh Binh
16	DF	Nguyễn Thành Chung	8 September 1997 (aged 28)	36	0	(Vietnam Football Federation) Hanoi FC
17	FW	Phạm Gia Hưng	26 April 2000 (aged 26)	5	0	(Vietnam Football Federation) Ninh Binh
18	MF	Nguyễn Hai Long	27 August 2000 (aged 25)	17	5	(Vietnam Football Federation) Hanoi FC
19	MF	Nguyễn Quang Hải (captain)	12 April 1997 (aged 29)	80	14	(Vietnam Football Federation) Cong An Hanoi
20	DF	Bùi Hoàng Việt Anh	1 January 1999 (aged 27)	26	1	(Vietnam Football Federation) Cong An Hanoi
21	GK	Trần Trung Kiên	9 February 2003 (aged 23)	1	0	(Vietnam Football Federation) Hoang Anh Gia Lai
22	FW	Nguyễn Trần Việt Cường	27 December 2000 (aged 25)	1	0	(Vietnam Football Federation) Becamex Ho Chi Minh City
23	GK	Đặng Văn Lâm	13 August 1993 (aged 32)	48	0	(Vietnam Football Federation) Ninh Binh
24	DF	Phan Tuấn Tài	7 January 2001 (aged 25)	18	0	(Vietnam Football Federation) The Cong–Viettel
25	MF	Nguyễn Ngọc Mỹ	20 April 2004 (aged 22)	0	0	(Vietnam Football Federation) Dong A Thanh Hoa
26	MF	Lê Văn Đô	7 August 2001 (aged 24)	2	0	(Vietnam Football Federation) Cong An Hanoi

== Group B ==
=== Laos ===
Laos announced their 31-men preliminary squad on 5 June 2026. The squad was reduced to 30 players on 8 June after Peter Phanthavong withdrew injured. The final squad was announced on 24 July.

Head coach: (Serbia) Vladica Grujic

No.	Pos.	Player	Date of birth (age)	Caps	Goals	Club
1	GK	Kop Lokphathip	8 May 2006 (aged 20)	6	0	(Lao Football Federation) Ezra
2	DF	Phoutthavong Sangvilay	16 October 2004 (aged 21)	27	2	(Football Association of Thailand) BG Pathum United
3	DF	Sonevilay Phetviengsy	27 May 2004 (aged 22)	1	0	(Lao Football Federation) Mazda GB
4	DF	Kaharn Phetsivilay	9 September 1998 (aged 27)	14	0	(Lao Football Federation) Luang Prabang
5	DF	Phetdavanh Somsanith	24 April 2004 (aged 22)	17	0	(Lao Football Federation) Ezra
6	MF	Chanthavixay Khounthoumphone	17 February 2004 (aged 22)	22	1	(Lao Football Federation) Ezra
7	MF	Sayfon Keohanam	11 July 2006 (aged 20)	2	0	(Football Association of Thailand) Chiangmai United
8	MF	Damoth Thongkhamsavath (captain)	3 April 2004 (aged 22)	17	1	(Vietnam Football Federation) Dong A Thanh Hoa
9	MF	Khonesavanh Keonuchanh	4 June 2004 (aged 22)	0	0	(Italian Football Federation) Rome City Institute
10	FW	Soukphachan Lueanthala	24 August 2002 (aged 23)	17	0	(Lao Football Federation) Salavan United
11	FW	Chony Waenpaseuth	27 November 2002 (aged 23)	26	2	(Lao Football Federation) Ezra
12	GK	Keo-Oudone Souvannasangso	19 June 2000 (aged 26)	12	0	(Lao Football Federation) Army
13	DF	Viengxay Sidavong	3 July 1996 (aged 30)	1	0	(Lao Football Federation) Namtha United
14	FW	Kouaycheng Noophackde	2 January 2001 (aged 25)	1	0	(Lao Football Federation) Champasak Avenir
15	MF	Phayak Siphanom	4 March 2008 (aged 18)	0	0	(Football Association of Thailand) Chainat Hornbill
16	DF	Xayasith Singsavang	13 December 2000 (aged 25)	11	0	(Lao Football Federation) Namtha United
17	FW	Bounphachan Bounkong	29 November 2000 (aged 25)	36	8	(Football Federation of Cambodia) PKR Svay Rieng
18	GK	Soulisack Souvankham	10 September 2007 (aged 18)	0	0	(Lao Football Federation) Luang Prabang
19	DF	Bounphaeng Xaysombath	5 February 2005 (aged 21)	3	0	(Lao Football Federation) Luang Prabang
20	FW	Bounchay Chernvanglien	28 December 2006 (aged 19)	0	0	(Lao Football Federation) Namtha United
21	DF	Vongsakda Chanthaleuxay	28 November 2004 (aged 21)	2	0	(Lao Football Federation) Mazda GB
22	MF	Somlith Sengvanny	5 August 1999 (aged 26)	4	0	(Lao Football Federation) Army
23	DF	Phonsack Sisavath	4 October 2004 (aged 21)	7	0	(Lao Football Federation) Young Elephants
24	DF	Vilai Kulungsy	24 September 2000 (aged 25)	0	0	(Lao Football Federation) BIS Master
25	DF	Avilay Siphavanh	6 May 2005 (aged 21)	0	0	(Lao Football Federation) Salavan United
26	DF	Phahatxay Keomany	27 April 2006 (aged 20)	0	0	(Lao Football Federation) Young Elephants

=== Malaysia ===
Malaysia announced their 26-man preliminary squad on 11 July 2026. Richard Chin withdrew and was replaced by Haqimi Azim on 15 July. Dominic Tan withdrew and was replaced by Aysar Hadi on 20 July. On 24 July, the final squad was announced, containing 25 players rather than the allowed 26 after Zhafri Yahya withdrew.

Head coach: Tan Cheng Hoe

No.	Pos.	Player	Date of birth (age)	Caps	Goals	Club
1	GK	Azri Ghani	30 April 1999 (aged 27)	2	0	(Football Association of Malaysia) Negeri Sembilan
2	DF	Jimmy Raymond	26 April 1996 (aged 30)	3	0	(Football Association of Malaysia) Kuching City
3	DF	Ubaidullah Shamsul	30 November 2003 (aged 22)	5	0	(Football Association of Malaysia) Terengganu
4	DF	Alif Ahmad	28 February 2003 (aged 23)	0	0	(Football Association of Malaysia) Johor Darul Ta'zim II
5	DF	Rodney Celvin	25 November 1996 (aged 29)	0	0	(Football Association of Malaysia) Kuching City
6	DF	Aysar Hadi	4 September 2003 (aged 22)	0	0	(Football Association of Malaysia) Johor Darul Ta'zim II
7	MF	Wan Kuzain	14 September 1998 (aged 27)	0	0	(United States Soccer Federation) Sporting JAX
8	MF	Ezequiel Agüero	7 April 1994 (aged 32)	19	3	(Football Association of Thailand) Kanchanaburi Power
9	FW	Hadi Fayyadh	22 January 2000 (aged 26)	0	0	(Japan Football Association) Vencedor Mie United
10	MF	Endrick	7 March 1995 (aged 31)	26	1	(Vietnam Football Federation) Cong An Ho Chi Minh City
11	FW	Fazrul Amir	27 February 2000 (aged 26)	5	0	(Football Association of Malaysia) Kuala Lumpur City
12	MF	Aliff Haiqal	11 July 2000 (aged 26)	3	0	(Football Association of Malaysia) Selangor
13	FW	Mohamadou Sumareh	20 September 1994 (aged 31)	35	7	(Football Association of Malaysia) Johor Darul Ta'zim
14	MF	Engku Nur Shakir	16 October 1998 (aged 27)	1	0	(Football Association of Malaysia) Terengganu
15	MF	Ibrahim Manusi	30 September 2001 (aged 24)	0	0	(Football Association of Malaysia) Johor Darul Ta'zim
16	GK	Haziq Aiman	19 January 2005 (aged 21)	0	0	(Football Association of Malaysia) Melaka
17	FW	Paulo Josué (captain)	13 March 1989 (aged 37)	29	10	(Football Association of Malaysia) Kuala Lumpur City
19	FW	Haqimi Azim	6 January 2003 (aged 23)	12	1	(Football Association of Malaysia) Terengganu
20	FW	Syafiq Ahmad	28 June 1995 (aged 31)	43	11	(Football Association of Brunei Darussalam) DPMM
21	FW	G. Pavithran	10 January 2005 (aged 21)	2	0	(Football Association of Malaysia) Johor Darul Ta'zim II
22	FW	Daryl Sham	30 November 2002 (aged 23)	2	0	(Football Association of Malaysia) Johor Darul Ta'zim
23	GK	Rahadiazli Rahalim	28 May 2001 (aged 25)	1	0	(Football Association of Malaysia) Terengganu
24	DF	V. Ruventhiran	24 August 2001 (aged 24)	9	0	(Football Association of Malaysia) Melaka
25	DF	Faris Danish	4 July 2006 (aged 20)	0	0	(Football Association of Malaysia) Johor Darul Ta'zim II
26	MF	Ziad El Basheer	24 December 2003 (aged 22)	0	0	(Football Association of Malaysia) Johor Darul Ta'zim II

=== Myanmar ===
Myanmar announced their final squad on 15 July 2026.

Head coach: (Norway) Jørn Andersen

No.	Pos.	Player	Date of birth (age)	Caps	Goals	Club
1	GK	Sann Satt Naing	4 November 1997 (aged 28)	10	0	(Myanmar Football Federation) Yangon United
2	DF	Hein Phyo Win	19 September 1998 (aged 27)	35	0	(Football Association of Thailand) Nakhon Ratchasima
3	DF	Hein Zeyar Lin	12 August 2000 (aged 25)	19	0	(Myanmar Football Federation) Yangon United
4	DF	Soe Moe Kyaw	23 March 1999 (aged 27)	31	3	(Football Association of Thailand) Uthai Thani
5	DF	Nanda Kyaw (captain)	3 September 1996 (aged 29)	42	1	(Myanmar Football Federation) Shan United
6	MF	Kyaw Min Oo	16 June 1996 (aged 30)	33	1	(Football Association of Malaysia) Terengganu
7	MF	Lwin Moe Aung	10 December 1999 (aged 26)	55	5	(Football Association of Thailand) Mahasarakham SBT
8	MF	Wai Lin Aung	30 July 1999 (aged 26)	22	1	(Football Association of Malaysia) Negeri Sembilan
9	FW	Than Paing	6 December 1996 (aged 29)	49	6	(Football Association of Thailand) Trat
10	FW	Win Naing Tun	3 May 2000 (aged 26)	35	7	(Myanmar Football Federation) Yangon City
11	FW	Maung Maung Lwin	18 June 1995 (aged 31)	90	15	(Football Association of Thailand) Lamphun Warriors
12	FW	Min Maw Oo	6 March 2005 (aged 21)	4	0	(Myanmar Football Federation) Thitsar Arman
13	FW	Khun Kyaw Zin Hein	15 July 2002 (aged 24)	9	1	(Myanmar Football Federation) Yangon City
14	MF	Aung Myo Khant	6 May 2001 (aged 25)	3	0	(Myanmar Football Federation) Yangon United
15	DF	Zwe Khant Min	20 June 2000 (aged 26)	12	0	(Myanmar Football Federation) Yangon City
16	FW	Shine Wanna Aung	15 March 2006 (aged 20)	1	1	(Myanmar Football Federation) Thitsar Arman
17	DF	Phyo Pyae Sone	24 October 1999 (aged 26)	0	0	(Myanmar Football Federation) Shan United
18	GK	Nay Lin Htet	23 April 2002 (aged 24)	1	0	(Myanmar Football Federation) Hantharwaddy United
19	FW	Hein Htet Aung	5 October 2001 (aged 24)	25	0	(Football Association of Malaysia) Kelantan The Real Warriors
20	MF	Myat Kaung Khant	15 July 2000 (aged 26)	19	1	(Myanmar Football Federation) Shan United
21	MF	Ye Yint Aung	22 March 2000 (aged 26)	17	1	(Myanmar Football Federation) Shan United
22	MF	Zaw Win Thein	1 March 2003 (aged 23)	20	1	(Myanmar Football Federation) Yangon United
23	GK	Zin Nyi Nyi Aung	6 June 2000 (aged 26)	7	0	(Myanmar Football Federation) Yangon United
24	FW	Saw Myo Zaw	2006 (aged 19–20)	0	0	(Myanmar Football Federation) Thitsar Arman
25	DF	Myat Phone Khant	12 October 2006 (aged 19)	0	0	(Myanmar Football Federation) Thitsar Arman
26	MF	Kaung Myat Nyein	10 February 2004 (aged 22)	0	0	(Myanmar Football Federation) ISPE

=== Philippines ===
The Philippines announced their final squad, containing 24 players rather than the allowed 26, on 15 July 2026. The squad was extended to 26 players as Angelo Brückner and Michael Kempter joined the squad on 24 July, respectively.

Head coach: (Spain) Carles Cuadrat

No.	Pos.	Player	Date of birth (age)	Caps	Goals	Club
1	GK	Quincy Kammeraad	1 February 2001 (aged 25)	4	0	(Football Association of Malaysia) Kuala Lumpur City
2	DF	Adrian Ugelvik	29 April 2003 (aged 23)	6	0	(Football Association of Thailand) PT Prachuap
3	DF	Angelo Brückner	April 29, 2003 (aged 23)	0	0	(German Football Association) SpVgg Bayreuth
4	DF	Noah Leddel	30 August 2003 (aged 22)	2	0	(Football Association of Thailand) Ayutthaya United
5	DF	Scott Woods	7 May 2000 (aged 26)	15	0	(Football Association of Malaysia) Kuching City
6	MF	Sandro Reyes	29 March 2003 (aged 23)	31	5	(German Football Association) FC Gütersloh
7	FW	André Leipold	12 November 2001 (aged 24)	7	3	(Royal Dutch Football Association) Helmond Sport
8	MF	Gavin Muens	24 October 2004 (aged 21)	1	0	(Philippine Football Federation) Kaya–Iloilo
9	FW	Jarvey Gayoso	11 February 1997 (aged 29)	34	5	(Football Association of Thailand) Bangkok FC
10	MF	John Lucero	1 December 2003 (aged 22)	3	0	(Football Association of Thailand) Kanchanaburi Power
11	MF	Kenji Nishioka	9 June 2001 (aged 25)	2	0	(Philippine Football Federation) Manila Digger
12	DF	Jaime Rosquillo	20 March 2003 (aged 23)	1	0	(Philippine Football Federation) Dynamic Herb Cebu
13	FW	Martini Rey	13 June 1999 (aged 27)	0	0	(Philippine Football Federation) Kaya–Iloilo
14	MF	Oskari Kekkonen	24 September 1999 (aged 26)	17	0	(Football Association of Thailand) Lamphun Warriors
15	GK	Enrico Mangaoang	28 May 2002 (aged 24)	0	0	(Philippine Football Federation) Aguilas–UMak
16	GK	Patrick Deyto	15 February 1990 (aged 36)	22	0	(Philippine Football Federation) Kaya–Iloilo
17	MF	Cole Mrowka	6 April 2006 (aged 20)	2	1	(United States Soccer Federation) Columbus Crew
18	FW	Andres Aldeguer	18 December 2003 (aged 22)	0	0	(Philippine Football Federation) One Taguig
19	FW	Pocholo Bugas	3 December 2001 (aged 24)	15	0	(Croatian Football Federation) Vukovar 1991
20	DF	Michael Kempter	January 12, 1995 (aged 31)	15	0	(Football Association of Thailand) Muangthong United
21	DF	Daisuke Sato (captain)	20 September 1994 (aged 31)	62	3	(Philippine Football Federation) One Taguig
22	MF	Javier Mariona	17 October 2004 (aged 21)	7	0	(United States Soccer Federation) AV Alta
23	DF	Christian Rontini	20 July 1999 (aged 27)	26	1	(Italian Football Federation) Antella
24	DF	Santiago Rublico	18 August 2005 (aged 20)	17	1	(Royal Spanish Football Federation) Alcorcón
25	MF	Rocket Ritarita	16 April 2007 (aged 19)	0	0	(United States Soccer Federation) Maryland Terrapins
26	FW	Aarran Long	25 April 2009 (aged 17)	0	0	(Philippine Football Federation) BSM Lions

=== Thailand ===
Thailand announced their final squad, containing 25 players rather than the allowed 26, on 8 July 2026.

Head coach: (England) Anthony Hudson

No.	Pos.	Player	Date of birth (age)	Caps	Goals	Club
1	GK	Kampol Pathomakkakul	27 July 1992 (aged 33)	11	0	(Football Association of Thailand) Ratchaburi
2	DF	Nattapong Sayriya	26 April 1992 (aged 34)	8	0	(Football Association of Thailand) Chonburi
3	DF	Pansa Hemviboon	8 July 1990 (aged 36)	55	7	(Football Association of Thailand) Buriram United
4	DF	Manuel Bihr	17 September 1993 (aged 32)	24	1	(Football Association of Thailand) Bangkok United
5	MF	Seksan Ratree	14 March 2003 (aged 23)	17	7	(Football Association of Thailand) Rayong
6	MF	Sarach Yooyen (captain)	30 May 1992 (aged 34)	88	7	(Football Association of Thailand) BG Pathum United
7	MF	Kakana Khamyok	21 May 2004 (aged 22)	2	0	(Football Association of Thailand) Muangthong United
8	MF	Thossawat Limwannasathian	17 May 1993 (aged 33)	3	0	(Football Association of Thailand) Ratchaburi
9	FW	Yotsakorn Burapha	8 June 2005 (aged 21)	2	0	(Football Association of Thailand) Chonburi
10	MF	Worachit Kanitsribampen	24 August 1997 (aged 28)	34	2	(Football Association of Thailand) Port
11	FW	Chawanwit Saelao	12 September 2004 (aged 21)	0	0	(Football Association of Thailand) Prime Bangkok
12	DF	Waris Choolthong	8 January 2004 (aged 22)	2	0	(Football Association of Thailand) BG Pathum United
13	DF	Oussama Thiangkham	4 November 2003 (aged 22)	0	0	(Football Association of Thailand) PT Prachuap
14	FW	Teerasak Poeiphimai	21 September 2002 (aged 23)	26	7	(Football Association of Thailand) Port
15	DF	Narubadin Weerawatnodom	12 July 1994 (aged 32)	39	1	(Football Association of Thailand) Buriram United
16	DF	Adisorn Promrak	21 October 1993 (aged 32)	32	0	(Football Association of Thailand) Ratchaburi
17	MF	Picha Autra	7 January 1996 (aged 30)	9	0	(Football Association of Thailand) Bangkok United
18	FW	Jehhanafee Mamah	24 October 2005 (aged 20)	0	0	(Football Association of Thailand) PT Prachuap
19	MF	Pokklaw Anan	4 March 1991 (aged 35)	47	6	(Football Association of Thailand) Bangkok United
20	GK	Chatchai Budprom	4 February 1987 (aged 39)	19	0	(Football Association of Thailand) Buriram United
21	DF	Chaiyaphon Otton	4 April 2003 (aged 23)	0	0	(Football Association of Thailand) Port
22	DF	Pichitchai Sienkrathok	18 March 2003 (aged 23)	0	0	(Football Association of Thailand) Ayutthaya United
23	GK	Korrakot Pipatnadda	15 July 1999 (aged 27)	2	0	(Football Association of Thailand) Muangthong United
24	DF	Wanchai Jarunongkran	18 December 1996 (aged 29)	4	0	(Football Association of Thailand) Bangkok United
25	FW	Patrik Gustavsson	19 April 2001 (aged 25)	11	8	(Football Association of Thailand) BG Pathum United

== Statistics ==
Note: Only the final squad list of each national team is taken into consideration.

=== Age ===
==== Outfield players ====
- Oldest: Paulo Josué (Malaysia) (37 years, 133 days)
- Youngest: Aarran Long (Philippines) (17 years, 90 days)

==== Goalkeepers ====
- Oldest: Chatchai Budprom (Thailand) (39 years, 170 days)
- Youngest: Egidio Luro (Timor-Leste) (17 years, 231 days)

==== Captains ====
- Oldest: Paulo Josué (Malaysia) (37 years, 133 days)
- Youngest: Zenivio (Timor-Leste) (21 years, 93 days)

==== Coaches ====
- Oldest: Vladica Grujic (Laos) (63 years, 275 days)
- Youngest: Gavin Lee (Singapore) (35 years, 319 days)

=== Player representation by country confederation ===
Confederation	Players	Percentage
AFC	234	91.41%
UEFA	17	6.64%
CONCACAF	5	1.95%

=== Player representation by league system ===
Nations in bold were represented at the tournament.

Country	Players	Percentage	Outside national squad	Lower tier players
**Thailand**	44	16.80%	19	6
**Malaysia**	29	11.33%	7	5
**Cambodia**	27	10.55%	1	0
**Vietnam**	27	10.55%	2	0
**Singapore**	21	8.20%	1	0
**Indonesia**	20	7.81%	0	0
**Laos**	20	7.81%	0	0
**Myanmar**	18	7.03%	0	0
**Timor-Leste**	13	5.08%	0	4
**Philippines**	9	3.52%	0	1
Australia	5	1.95%	5	5
United States	5	1.95%	5	4
Netherlands	3	1.17%	2	2
Portugal	3	1.17%	3	3
Germany	2	0.78%	2	2
Italy	2	0.78%	2	2
Belgium	1	0.39%	1	0
Croatia	1	0.39%	1	0
England	1	0.39%	1	1
Ireland	1	0.39%	1	1
Japan	1	0.39%	1	1
Northern Ireland	1	0.39%	1	1
Slovakia	1	0.39%	1	0
Spain	1	0.39%	1	1
**Total**	**256**	**100%**	**57 (22.27%)**	**39 (15.23%)**

=== Coaches representation by country ===
Coaches in bold represented their own country.

Number	Country	Coaches
2	England	John Herdman (Indonesia), Anthony Hudson (Thailand)
1	Japan	Koji Gyotoku (Cambodia)
1	Malaysia	**Tan Cheng Hoe**
1	Norway	Jørn Andersen (Myanmar)
1	Portugal	Zé Pedro (Timor Leste)
1	Singapore	**Gavin Lee**
1	Serbia	Vladica Grujic (Laos)
1	South Korea	Kim Sang-sik (Vietnam)
1	Spain	Carles Cuadrat (Philippines)
