= 2026 ASEAN Championship Group B =

ASEAN Championship group

Group B of the 2026 ASEAN Championship took place from 25 July to 8 August 2026. The group consisted of Thailand, Malaysia, the Philippines, Myanmar, and Laos.

Thailand and Malaysia secured their place in the semi-finals. Thailand topped the group with four group game victories. Malaysia would advance as runners-up, with three wins and a loss. Myanmar finished third, the Philippines finished fourth, having won one match, while Laos finished fifth without registering a single point.

== Teams ==
Draw position	Team	Pot	Appearance	Previous best performance	FIFA Ranking	
Draw position	Team	Pot	Appearance	Previous best performance	December 2025	July 2026
A1	Thailand	1	16th	Winners (1996, 2000, 2002, 2014, 2016, 2020, 2022)	96	94
A2	Malaysia	2	15th	Winners (2010)	121	136
A3	Philippines	3	15th	Semi-finalists (2010, 2012, 2014, 2018, 2024)	136	135
A4	Myanmar	4	16th	Fourth place / Semi-finalists (2004, 2016)	163	158
A5	Laos	5	15th	Group stage (All appearances)	190	185

== Standings ==
Pos	Team	Pld	W	D	L	GF	GA	GD	Pts	Qualification
1	Thailand	4	4	0	0	10	0	+10	12	Advance to knockout stage
2	Malaysia	4	3	0	1	7	3	+4	9	Advance to knockout stage
3	Myanmar	4	2	0	2	12	7	+5	6	
4	Philippines	4	1	0	3	5	7	−2	3	
5	Laos	4	0	0	4	3	20	−17	0	

Source: ASEAN United
Rules for classification: Group stage tiebreakers

In the semi-finals:

- The winner of Group B, Thailand, advanced to play the runner-up of Group A, Singapore.
- The runner-up of Group B, Malaysia, advanced to play the winner of Group A, Vietnam.

== Matches ==
All times listed are local.

=== Myanmar vs Malaysia ===
25 July 2026
16:30 UTC+6:30

Myanmar	1–2	Malaysia
Myat Kaung Khant 10'	Report	Paulo Josué 52', 57' (pen.)

Thuwunna Stadium, Yangon
Attendance: 10,500
Referee: Yusuke Ohashi (Japan)

Myanmar	Malaysia

GK	23	Zin Nyi Nyi Aung
RB	2	Hein Phyo Win	(yellow card) 77'
CB	4	Soe Moe Kyaw	(yellow card) 59'
CB	3	Hein Zeyar Lin
LB	5	Nanda Kyaw (c)		(substituted off) 76'
CM	11	Maung Maung Lwin
CM	6	Kyaw Min Oo	(yellow card) 14'
RW	19	Hein Htet Aung		(substituted off) 76'
AM	20	Myat Kaung Khant		(substituted off) 85'
LW	10	Win Naing Tun
CF	9	Than Paing
Substitutions:
FW	24	Saw Myo Zaw		(substituted on) 76'
FW	13	Khun Kyaw Zin Hein		(substituted on) 76'
DF	25	Myat Phone Khant		(substituted on) 85'
Manager:
(Norway) Jørn Andersen

GK	1	Azri Ghani
RB	4	Alif Ahmad		(substituted off) 85'
CB	5	Rodney Celvin
CB	3	Ubaidullah Shamsul
LB	24	V. Ruventhiran
CM	10	Endrick		(substituted off) 74'
CM	8	Sergio Aguero		(substituted off) 63'
CM	21	G. Pavithran
RF	13	Mohamadou Sumareh		(substituted off) 63'
CF	17	Paulo Josué (c)	(yellow card) 59'
LF	20	Syafiq Ahmad		(substituted off) 74'
Substitutions:
MF	12	Aliff Haiqal		(substituted on) 63'
FW	19	Haqimi Azim		(substituted on) 63'
MF	7	Wan Kuzain		(substituted on) 74'
FW	22	Daryl Sham		(substituted on) 74'
MF	14	Engku Nur Shakir		(substituted on) 85'
Manager:
Tan Cheng Hoe

Hyundai Player of the Match:
Paulo Josué (Malaysia)

Assistant referees:
Takeshi Asada (Japan)
Abdul Hannan bin Abdul Hasim (Singapore)
Fourth official:
Ahmad A'Qashah (Singapore)
Video assistant referee:
Pansa Chaisanit (Thailand)
Assistant video assistant referee:
Mongkolchai Pechsri (Thailand)

=== Laos vs Thailand ===
25 July 2026
20:00 UTC+7

Laos	0–5	Thailand
	Report	Teerasak 11'; Kakana 27', 59'; Yotsakorn 49'; Sarach 52'

New Laos National Stadium, Vientiane
Attendance: 7,678
Referee: Choi Hyun-jai (South Korea)

Laos	Thailand

GK	1	Kop Lokphatip
CB	4	Kaharn Phetsivilay
CB	5	Phetdavanh Somsanith	(red card) 43'
CB	19	Bounphaeng Xaysombath		(substituted off) 37'
RWB	21	Vongsakda Chanthaleuxay	(yellow card) 25'	(substituted off) 65'
LWB	2	Phoutthavong Sangvilay
RM	8	Damoth Thongkhamsavath (c)
CM	6	Chanthavixay Khounthoumphone		(substituted off) 65'
CM	22	Somlith Sengvanny	(yellow card) 14'	(substituted off) 46'
LM	11	Chony Waenpaseuth
CF	14	Kouaycheng Noophackde		(substituted off) 65'
Substitutions:
FW	10	Soukphachan Lueanthala		(substituted on) 37'
DF	23	Phonsack Sisavath		(substituted on) 46'
FW	24	Vilai Kulungsy	(yellow card) 82'	(substituted on) 65'
FW	16	Xayasith Singsavang		(substituted on) 65'
MF	20	Bounchay Chernvanglien		(substituted on) 65'
Manager:
(Serbia) Vladica Grujic

GK	1	Kampol Pathomakkakul
RB	15	Narubadin Weerawatnodom		(substituted off) 60'
CB	4	Manuel Bihr
CB	2	Nattapong Sayriya
LB	24	Wanchai Jarunongkran		(substituted off) 60'
DM	6	Sarach Yooyen (c)		(substituted off) 73'
RM	9	Yotsakorn Burapha	(yellow card) 79'
CM	5	Seksan Ratree
CM	21	Chaiyaphon Otton
LM	14	Teerasak Poeiphimai		(substituted off) 73'
CF	7	Kakana Khamyok	(yellow card) 26'	(substituted off) 60'
Substitutions:
FW	11	Chawanwit Saelao		(substituted on) 60'
DF	12	Waris Choolthong		(substituted on) 60'
DF	13	Oussama Thiangkham		(substituted on) 60'
FW	18	Jehhanafee Mamah		(substituted on) 73'
MF	19	Pokklaw Anan		(substituted on) 73'
Manager:
(England) Anthony Hudson

Hyundai Player of the Match:
Teerasak Poeiphimai (Thailand)

Assistant referees:
Cheon Jin-hee (South Korea)
Nurhadi Surchan (Indonesia)
Fourth official:
Naufan Adya Fairuski (Indonesia)
Video assistant referee:
Muhammad Taqi (Singapore)
Assistant video assistant referee:
Farhad Mohamed (Singapore)

=== Philippines vs Myanmar ===
28 July 2026
18:00 UTC+8

Philippines	1–4	Myanmar
Gayoso 68'	Report	Kyaw Min Oo 7'; Than Paing 28', 83'; Win Naing Tun 81'

New Clark City Athletics Stadium, Capas
Attendance: 3,104
Referee: Jin Jingyuan (China)

Philippines	Myanmar

GK	1	Quincy Kammeraad
RB	24	Santiago Rublico
CB	4	Noah Leddel
CB	21	Daisuke Sato	(yellow card) 78'	(substituted off) 87'
LB	5	Scott Woods		(substituted off) 46'
RM	19	Pocholo Bugas		(substituted off) 46'
CM	17	Cole Mrowka
CM	14	Oskari Kekkonen		(substituted off) 76'
CM	6	Sandro Reyes	(yellow card) 11'
LM	22	Javier Mariona
CF	9	Jarvey Gayoso		(substituted off) 76'
Substitutions:
DF	2	Adrian Ugelvik		(substituted on) 46'
MF	11	Kenji Nishioka		(substituted on) 46'
FW	13	Martini Rey		(substituted on) 76'
MF	25	Rocket Ritarita		(substituted on) 76'
FW	18	Andres Aldeguer		(substituted on) 87'
Manager:
(Spain) Carles Cuadrat

GK	23	Zin Nyi Nyi Aung
RB	2	Hein Phyo Win		(substituted off) 74'
CB	4	Soe Moe Kyaw
CB	3	Hein Zeyar Lin	(yellow card) 22'
LB	25	Myat Phone Khant	(yellow card) 34'	(substituted off) 68'
CM	11	Maung Maung Lwin	(yellow card) 21'
CM	6	Kyaw Min Oo
RW	7	Lwin Moe Aung		(substituted off) 68'
AM	20	Myat Kaung Khant		(substituted off) 87'
LW	10	Win Naing Tun		(substituted off) 87'
CF	9	Than Paing
Substitutions:
DF	17	Phyo Pyae Sone		(substituted on) 68'
FW	19	Hein Htet Aung		(substituted on) 68'
DF	15	Zwe Khant Min		(substituted on) 74'
MF	8	Wai Lin Aung		(substituted on) 87'
MF	14	Aung Myo Khant		(substituted on) 87'
Manager:
(Norway) Jørn Andersen

Hyundai Player of the Match:
Than Paing (Myanmar)

Assistant referees:
Tang Chao (China)
Muhammad Syafiq bin Juffri (Singapore)
Fourth official:
Muhammad Zulfiqar (Singapore)
Video assistant referee:
Sivakorn Pu-udom (Thailand)
Assistant video assistant referee:
Mongkolchai Pechsri (Thailand)

=== Malaysia vs Laos ===
28 July 2026
21:00 UTC+8

Malaysia	4–0	Laos
Paulo Josué 45'; Endrick 57'; Viengxay 66' (o.g.); Wan Kuzain 84'	Report

Kuala Lumpur Stadium, Kuala Lumpur
Attendance: 10,044
Referee: Sami Al-Ismail (Saudi Arabia)

Malaysia	Laos

GK	1	Azri Ghani
RB	2	Jimmy Raymond
CB	5	Rodney Celvin	(yellow card) 50'
CB	3	Ubaidullah Shamsul
LB	24	V. Ruventhiran
CM	10	Endrick		(substituted off) 71'
CM	8	Sergio Aguero	(yellow card) 36'	(substituted off) 80'
CM	20	Syafiq Ahmad		(substituted off) 71'
RF	13	Mohamadou Sumareh		(substituted off) 71'
CF	17	Paulo Josué (c)		(substituted off) 79'
LF	21	G. Pavithran
Substitutions:
MF	7	Wan Kuzain		(substituted on) 71'
MF	14	Engku Nur Shakir		(substituted on) 71'
MF	12	Aliff Haiqal		(substituted on) 71'
FW	19	Haqimi Azim		(substituted on) 79'
FW	22	Daryl Sham		(substituted on) 80'
Manager:
Tan Cheng Hoe

GK	12	Keo-Oudone Souvannasangso
CB	3	Sonevilay Phetviengsy
CB	4	Kaharn Phetsivilay
CB	13	Viengxay Sydavong
RWB	24	Vilai Kulungsy	(yellow card) 83'
LWB	23	Phonsack Seesavath		(substituted off) 73'
CM	6	Chanthavixay Khounthoumphone	(yellow card) 20'	(substituted off) 45'
CM	8	Damoth Thongkhamsavath (c)
CM	16	Xayasith Singsavang		(substituted off) 45'
CF	20	Bounchay Chernvanglien		(substituted off) 72'
CF	10	Soukpachan Leuanthala		(substituted off) 45'
Substitutions:
MF	22	Somlith Sengvanny		(substituted on) 45'
FW	14	Kouaycheng Noophackde		(substituted on) 45'
FW	11	Chony Waenpaseuth		(substituted on) 45'
MF	15	Phayak Siphanom		(substituted on) 72'
DF	21	Vongsakda Chanthaleuxay	(yellow card) 90'	(substituted on) 73'
Manager:
(Serbia) Vladica Grujic

Hyundai Player of the Match:
Pavithran Gunalan (Malaysia)

Assistant referees:
Hesham Mohammed Abdullah Al Refaei (Saudi Arabia)
Fajar Furqon (Indonesia)
Fourth official:
Hoàng Ngọc Hà (Vietnam)
Video assistant referee:
Muhammad Taqi (Singapore)
Assistant video assistant referee:
Pansa Chaisanit (Thailand)

=== Laos vs Philippines ===
1 August 2026
17:00 UTC+7

Laos	1–4	Philippines
Damoth 7'	Report	Lucero 47'; Viengxay 52' (o.g.); Gayoso 60' (pen.); Sato 88'

New Laos National Stadium, Vientiane
Attendance: 1,188
Referee: Kim Hee-gon (South Korea)

Laos	Philippines

GK	1	Kop Lokphatip
RB	25	Avilay Siphavanh		(substituted off) 17'
CB	5	Phetdavanh Somsansid	(yellow card) 12' (red card) 14'
CB	4	Kaharn Phetsivilay
LB	2	Photthavong Sangvilay
CM	9	Khonesavanh Keonuchanh		(substituted off) 64'
CM	20	Bounchay Chernvanglien		(substituted off) 64'
RW	15	Phayak Siphanom		(substituted off) 64'
AM	8	Damoth Thongkhamsavath (c)		(substituted off) 34'
LW	11	Chony Wenpaserth	(yellow card) 45+4'
CF	14	Kouaycheng Nouphakdy
Substitutions:
DF	13	Viengxay Sydavong		(substituted on) 17'
DF	23	Phonsack Sisavath	(yellow card) 90+2'	(substituted on) 34'
DF	16	Xayasith Singsavang		(substituted on) 64'
MF	22	Somlith Sengvanny		(substituted on) 64'
FW	10	Soukphachan Lueanthala	(yellow card) 86'	(substituted on) 64'
Manager:
(Serbia) Vladica Grujic

GK	1	Quincy Kammeraad
RB	10	John Lucero		(substituted off) 64'
CB	2	Adrian Ugelvik
CB	23	Christian Rontini		(substituted off) 46'
LB	21	Daisuke Sato (c)
DM	8	Gavin Muens
RM	22	Javier Mariona		(substituted off) 84'
CM	6	Sandro Reyes		(substituted off) 64'
CM	17	Cole Mrowka
LM	11	Kenji Nishioka
CF	9	Jarvey Gayoso	(yellow card) 45+2'	(substituted off) 72'
Substitutions:
DF	5	Scott Woods		(substituted on) 46'
DF	24	Santiago Rublico		(substituted on) 64'
MF	14	Oskari Kekkonen		(substituted on) 64'
FW	13	Martini Rey		(substituted on) 72'
FW	26	Aarran Long		(substituted on) 84'
Manager:
(Spain) Carles Cuadrat

Hyundai Player of the Match:
Cole Mrowka (Philippines)

Assistant referees:
Cheon Jin-hee (South Korea)
Bangbang Syamsudar (Indonesia)
Fourth official:
Hoàng Ngọc Hà (Vietnam)
Video assistant referee:
Sivakorn Pu-udom (Thailand)
Assistant video assistant referee:
Pansa Chaisanit (Thailand)

=== Thailand vs Malaysia ===
1 August 2026
20:00 UTC+7

Thailand	2–0	Malaysia
Yotsakorn 38' (pen.); Teerasak 56'	Report

Rajamangala Stadium, Bangkok
Attendance: 16,037
Referee: Kim Woo-sung (South Korea)

Thailand	Malaysia

GK	1	Kampol Pathomakkakul
RB	15	Narubadin Weerawatnodom		(substituted off) 62'
CB	4	Manuel Bihr
CB	2	Nattapong Sayriya
LB	13	Oussama Thiangkham
CM	5	Seksan Ratree	(yellow card) 44'	(substituted off) 62'
CM	6	Sarach Yooyen (c)
CM	21	Chaiyaphon Otton		(substituted off) 46'
RF	9	Yotsakorn Burapha		(substituted off) 90'
CF	7	Kakana Khamyok
LF	14	Teerasak Poeiphimai		(substituted off) 71'
Substitutions:
MF	10	Worachit Kanitsribampen		(substituted on) 46'
DF	12	Waris Choolthong		(substituted on) 62'
MF	19	Pokklaw Anan		(substituted on) 62'
FW	18	Jehhanafee Mamah		(substituted on) 71'
FW	11	Chawanwit Saelao		(substituted on) 90'
Manager:
(England) Anthony Hudson

GK	1	Azri Ghani
RB	2	Jimmy Raymond	(substituted off) 57'
CB	5	Rodney Celvin
CB	3	Ubaidullah Shamsul
LB	24	V. Ruventhiran	(substituted off) 46'
RM	13	Mohamadou Sumareh	(substituted off) 72'
CM	12	Aliff Haiqal
CM	8	Sergio Agüero	(substituted off) 72'
LM	21	G. Pavithran
CF	17	Paulo Josué (c)
CF	20	Syafiq Ahmad	(substituted off) 62'
Substitutions:
DF	25	Faris Danish	(substituted on) 46'
DF	4	Alif Ahmad	(substituted on) 57'
MF	7	Wan Kuzain	(substituted on) 62'
MF	14	Engku Nur Shakir	(substituted on) 72'
FW	22	Daryl Sham	(substituted on) 72'
Manager:
Tan Cheng Hoe

Hyundai Player of the Match:
Sarach Yooyen (Thailand)

Assistant referees:
Park Sang-jun (South Korea)
Nguyễn Trung Việt (Vietnam)
Fourth official:
Lê Vũ Linh (Vietnam)
Video assistant referee:
Muhammad Taqi (Singapore)
Assistant video assistant referee:
Farhad Mohamed (Singapore)

=== Myanmar vs Laos ===
4 August 2026
16:30 UTC+6:30

Myanmar	7–2	Laos
Lwin Moe Aung 2'; Win Naing Tun 20', 41', 83'; Maung Maung Lwin 45+6' (pen.); Than Paing 52'; Hein Htet Aung 81'	Report	Bounchay 17'; Phoutthavong 23'

Thuwunna Stadium, Yangon
Attendance: 11,600
Referee: Alimardon Bainazarov (Kyrgyzstan)

Myanmar	Laos

GK	23	Zin Nyi Nyi Aung
RB	15	Zwe Khant Min	(yellow card) 25'	(substituted off) 76'
CB	4	Soe Moe Kyaw		(substituted off) 84'
CB	3	Hein Zeyar Lin		(substituted off) 84'
LB	13	Khun Kyaw Zin Hein
CM	11	Maung Maung Lwin (c)	(red card) 70'
CM	6	Kyaw Min Oo		(substituted off) 76'
CM	20	Myat Kaung Khant
RF	7	Lwin Moe Aung		(substituted off) 76'
CF	9	Than Paing
LF	10	Win Naing Tun
Substitutions:
FW	19	Hein Htet Aung		(substituted on) 76'
DF	25	Myat Phone Khant		(substituted on) 76'
MF	8	Wai Lin Aung		(substituted on) 76'
DF	17	Phyo Pyae Sone		(substituted on) 84'
FW	16	Shine Wanna Aung		(substituted on) 84'
Manager
(Norway) Jørn Andersen

GK	1	Kop Lokphathip
RB	24	Vilai Kulungsy	(yellow card) 62'
CB	4	Kaharn Phetsivilay	(yellow card) 45+4'
CB	26	Phahatxay Keomany
LB	23	Phonsack Seesavath
CM	9	Khonesavanh Keonuchanh		(substituted off) 46'
CM	16	Xayasith Singsavang
RM	15	Phayak Siphanom	(yellow card) 4'	(substituted off) 55'
AM	20	Bounchay Chernvanglien
LM	2	Phoutthavong Sangvilay (c)		(substituted off) 66'
CF	11	Chony Wenpaserth		(substituted off) 55'
Substitutions:
MF	22	Somlith Sengvanny		(substituted on) 46'
FW	14	Kouaycheng Noophackde		(substituted on) 55'
DF	21	Vongsakda Chanthaleuxay		(substituted on) 55'
MF	7	Sayfon Keohanam	(yellow card) 70' (red card) 72'	(substituted on) 66'
Manager
(Serbia) Vladica Grujic

Hyundai Player of the Match:
Win Naing Tun (Myanmar)

Assistant referees:
İsmailjan Talipjanov (Kyrgyzstan)
Huang Xin Jie (Singapore)
Fourth official:
Muhammad Zulfiqar (Singapore)
Video assistant referee:
Pansa Chaisanit (Thailand)
Assistant video assistant referee:
Jun Mihara (Japan)

=== Philippines vs Thailand ===
4 August 2026
21:00 UTC+8

Philippines	0–1	Thailand
	Report	Waris 84'

New Clark City Athletics Stadium, Capas
Attendance: 2,786
Referee: Yusuke Ohashi (Japan)

Philippines	Thailand

GK	16	Patrick Deyto
RB	22	Javier Mariona		(substituted off) 73'
CB	2	Adrian Ugelvik
CB	23	Christian Rontini		(substituted off) 84'
LB	21	Daisuke Sato (c)
DM	14	Oskari Kekkonen	(yellow card) 71'	(substituted off) 73'
RM	6	Sandro Reyes
CM	8	Gavin Muens	(yellow card) 20'	(substituted off) 90'
CM	17	Cole Mrowka
LM	11	Kenji Nishioka
CF	9	Jarvey Gayoso		(substituted off) 84'
Substitutions:
DF	5	Scott Woods		(substituted on) 73'
FW	19	Pocholo Bugas		(substituted on) 73'
MF	10	John Lucero		(substituted on) 84'
DF	4	Noah Leddel		(substituted on) 84'
FW	18	Andres Aldeguer	(yellow card) 90+6'	(substituted on) 90'
Manager:
(Spain) Carles Cuadrat

GK	1	Kampol Pathomakkakul (c)
RB	12	Waris Choolthong
CB	2	Nattapong Sayriya
CB	3	Pansa Hemviboon
LB	24	Wanchai Jarunongkran
RM	11	Chawanwit Saelao		(substituted off) 46'
CM	5	Seksan Ratree		(substituted off) 67'
CM	8	Thossawat Limwannasathian		(substituted off) 82'
LM	19	Pokklaw Anan		(substituted off) 46'
CF	10	Worachit Kanitsribumphen
CF	18	Jehhanafee Mamah		(substituted off) 57'
Substitutions:
FW	14	Teerasak Poeiphimai	(yellow card) 90+1'	(substituted on) 46'
MF	17	Picha Autra		(substituted on) 46'
MF	7	Kakana Khamyok		(substituted on) 57'
FW	9	Yotsakorn Burapha		(substituted on) 67'
MF	6	Sarach Yooyen		(substituted on) 82'
Manager:
(England) Anthony Hudson

Hyundai Player of the Match:
Waris Choolthong (Thailand)

Assistant referees:
Tomoyuki Umeda (Japan)
Nurhadi Sulchan (Indonesia)
Fourth official:
Nguyễn Mạnh Hải (Vietnam)
Video assistant referee:
Farhad bin Mohamed (Singapore)
Assistant video assistant referee:
Lee Seul-gi (South Korea)

=== Thailand vs Myanmar ===
8 August 2026
20:00 UTC+7

Thailand	2–0	Myanmar
Worachit 11' (pen.); Jehhanafee 52' (pen.)	Report

Rajamangala Stadium, Bangkok
Attendance: 13,026
Referee: Yusuke Ohashi (Japan)

Thailand	Myanmar

GK	1	Kampol Pathomakkakul
RB	15	Narubodin Weerawatnodom	(substituted off) 73'
CB	4	Manuel Bihr
CB	3	Pansa Hemviboon	(substituted off) 62'
LB	13	Oussama Thiangkham
RM	17	Picha Autra
CM	21	Chaiyaphon Otton
CM	6	Sarach Yooyen (c)
LM	10	Worachit Kanitsribumphen	(substituted off) 73'
CF	11	Chawanwit Saelao	(substituted off) 89'
CF	18	Jehhanafee Mamah	(substituted off) 89'
Substitutions
DF	2	Nattapong Sayriya	(substituted on) 62'
MF	8	Thossawat Limwannasthian	(substituted on) 73'
DF	12	Waris Choolthong	(substituted on) 73'
FW	16	Adisorn Promrak	(substituted on) 89'
FW	24	Wanchai Jarunongkran	(substituted on) 89'
Manager
(England) Anthony Hudson

GK	23	Zin Nyi Nyi Aung
RB	15	Zwe Khant Min		(substituted off) 59'
CB	4	Soe Moe Kyaw
CB	3	Hein Zeyar Lin
LB	25	Myat Phone Khant		(substituted off) 59'
CM	8	Wai Lin Aung		(substituted off) 59'
CM	6	Kyaw Min Oo (c)	(yellow card) 54'
CM	20	Myat Kaung Khant
RF	7	Lwin Moe Aung		(substituted off) 77'
CF	9	Than Paing
LF	10	Win Naing Tun		(substituted off) 89'
Substitutions
DF	19	Hein Htet Aung		(substituted on) 59'
DF	13	Zin Hein Khun Kyaw		(substituted on) 59'
MF	16	Shine Wanna Aung	(yellow card) 90+2'	(substituted on) 59'
FW	24	Saw Myo Zaw		(substituted on) 77'
FW	14	Aung Myo Khant		(substituted on) 89'
Manager
(Norway) Jørn Andersen			(yellow card) 51'

Hyundai Player of the Match:
Jehhanafee Mamah (Thailand)

Assistant referees:
Yusuke Takebe (Japan)
Bangbang Syamsudar (Indonesia)
Fourth official:
Hoàng Ngọc Hà (Vietnam)
Video assistant referee:
Farhad bin Mohamed (Singapore)
Assistant video assistant referee:
Lee Seul-gi (South Korea)

=== Malaysia vs Philippines ===
8 August 2026
21:00 UTC+8

Malaysia	1–0	Philippines
Pavithran 16'	Report

Kuala Lumpur Stadium, Kuala Lumpur
Attendance: 12,734
Referee: Alimardon Bainazarov (Kyrgyzstan)

Malaysia	Philippines

GK	1	Azri Ghani
RB	4	Alif Ahmad
CB	5	Rodney Celvin
CB	3	Ubaidullah Shamsul
LB	25	Faris Danish
CM	7	Wan Kuzain		(substituted off) 78'
CM	8	Sergio Agüero
CM	12	Aliff Haiqal	(yellow card) 45+1'	(substituted off) 46'
RF	13	Mohamadou Sumareh		(substituted off) 79'
CF	17	Paulo Josué (c)
LF	21	G. Pavithran
Substitutions:
MF	20	Syafiq Ahmad		(substituted on) 46'
MF	22	Daryl Sham		(substituted on) 78'
FW	11	Fazrul Amir Zaman		(substituted on) 79'	(substituted off) 90+1'
FW	19	Haqimi Azim		(substituted on) 90+1'
Manager
Tan Cheng Hoe

GK	16	Patrick Deyto
CB	2	Adrian Ugelvik
CB	23	Christian Rontini
CB	21	Daisuke Sato (c)		(substituted off) 46'
RM	22	Javier Mariona	(yellow card) 20'	(substituted off) 46'
CM	14	Oskari Kekkonen		(substituted off) 46'
CM	8	Gavin Muens	(yellow card) 66'
LM	11	Kenji Nishioka
AM	6	Sandro Reyes		(substituted off) 82'
AM	17	Cole Mrowka		(substituted off) 72'
CF	9	Jarvey Gayoso
Substitutions:
FW	19	Pocholo Bugas		(substituted on) 46'
DF	4	Noah Leddel		(substituted on) 46'
DF	12	Jaime Rosquillo		(substituted on) 46'
DF	10	John Lucero		(substituted on) 72'
DF	5	Scott Woods		(substituted on) 82'
Manager
(Spain) Carles Cuadrat

Hyundai Player of the Match:
Pavithran Gunalan (Malaysia)

Assistant referees:
İsmailjan Talipjanov (Kyrgyzstan)
Abdul Hannan bin Abdul Hasim (Singapore)
Fourth official:
Muhammad Zulfiqar (Singapore)
Video assistant referee:
Pansa Chaisanit (Thailand)
Assistant video assistant referee:
Jun Mihara (Japan)

== Discipline ==
The team conduct ("fair play") score would have been used as a tiebreaker if the head-to-head and overall records of teams were tied. The score was calculated based on yellow and red cards received by players and team officials in all group matches as follows:

- yellow card: −1 point;
- indirect red card (second yellow card): −3 points;
- direct red card: −4 points;
- yellow card and direct red card: −5 points;

Only one of the above deductions could be applied to a player or team official in a single match.

Team	Match 1				Match 2				Match 3				Match 4				Match 5				Score
Team	Yellow card	(yellow card) (yellow-red card)	Red card	(yellow card) (red card)	Yellow card	(yellow card) (yellow-red card)	Red card	(yellow card) (red card)	Yellow card	(yellow card) (yellow-red card)	Red card	(yellow card) (red card)	Yellow card	(yellow card) (yellow-red card)	Red card	(yellow card) (red card)	Yellow card	(yellow card) (yellow-red card)	Red card	(yellow card) (red card)	Score
Thailand	2								1				1								–4
Malaysia	1				2												1				–4
Philippines					2				1				3				2				–8
Myanmar	3				3								1		1		2				–12
Laos	3		1		3				3			1	3		1						–25
