= 2026 FIFA ASEAN Cup squads =

Squads for a football tournament

The 2026 FIFA ASEAN Cup is an international football tournament held in Indonesia and Hong Kong from 24 September to 5 October 2026. The 14 national teams involved in the tournament are required to register a squad of 23 players, including three goalkeepers, selected from an initial provisional list of 35 players. Only players in these squads are eligible to take part in the tournament.

The position listed for each player is per the official squad list published by FIFA. The age listed for each player is on 24 September 2026, the first day of the tournament. The numbers of caps and goals listed for each player do not include any matches played after the start of the tournament. The club listed is the club for which the player last played a competitive match prior to the tournament. (Note: This is the club a player was last able to play for during the previous season in the event a player did not play a competitive match.) The nationality for each club reflects the national association (not the league) to which the club is affiliated. A flag is included for coaches who are of a different nationality than their own national team.

== FIFA ASEAN Cup (Division 1) ==
=== Group A ===
==== Bangladesh ====
Bangladesh announced their final squad on 18 September.

Head coach: (United States) Thomas Dooley

No.	Pos.	Player	Date of birth (age)	Caps	Goals	Club
1	GK	Mehedi Hasan Srabon	12 August 2005 (age 21)	5	0	(Bangladesh Football Federation) Bashundhara Kings
2	DF	Shakil Ahad Topu	6 April 2006 (age 20)	12	0	(Bangladesh Football Federation) Mohammedan
3	DF	Rahmat Mia	8 December 1999 (age 26)	40	0	(Bangladesh Football Federation) Mohammedan
4	FW	Minhazul Karim Shadin	10 March 2002 (age 24)	1	0	(Bangladesh Football Federation) Chattogram City
5	MF	Mohammad Ridoy	1 January 2002 (age 24)	27	0	(Bangladesh Football Federation) Bashundhara Kings
6	MF	Jamal Bhuyan (captain)	10 April 1990 (age 36)	95	1	(Bangladesh Football Federation) Brothers Union
7	FW	Shekh Morsalin	19 February 2005 (age 21)	26	7	(Bangladesh Football Federation) Dhaka Abahani
8	MF	Hamza Choudhury	1 October 1997 (age 29)	12	4	(The Football Association) Sheffield United
9	FW	Shuki Itofusa	31 March 2004 (age 22)	2	0	(Bangladesh Football Federation) Fortis
10	FW	Rakib Hossain	18 November 1998 (age 27)	52	6	(Bangladesh Football Federation) Bashundhara Kings
11	FW	Shahriar Emon	7 March 2001 (age 25)	13	0	(Bangladesh Football Federation) Mohammedan
12	DF	Zidane Yousuf	22 September 2007 (age 19)	2	0	Free agent
13	GK	Mitul Marma	11 December 2003 (age 22)	21	0	(Bangladesh Football Federation) Dhaka Abahani
14	DF	Tariq Kazi	6 October 2000 (age 26)	40	2	(Bhutan Football Federation) Paro
15	FW	Fahamedul Islam	30 June 2006 (age 20)	9	0	Free agent
16	MF	Mohamed Sohel Rana	1 June 1996 (age 30)	24	0	(Bangladesh Football Federation) Mohammedan
17	MF	Sohel Rana	27 March 1995 (age 31)	82	1	(Bangladesh Football Federation) Bashundhara Kings
18	GK	Sujon Hossain	5 August 1996 (age 30)	1	0	(Bangladesh Football Federation) Mohammedan
19	DF	Zayyan Ahmed	29 January 2004 (age 22)	9	0	(United Arab Emirates Football Association) Rimal Al-Sahra
20	DF	Monjurur Rahman Manik	5 September 1996 (age 30)	1	0	(Bangladesh Football Federation) Fortis
21	FW	Farhaan Ali Wahid	9 December 2006 (age 19)	1	0	(The Football Association) Boreham Wood
22	DF	Md Saad Uddin	1 September 1998 (age 28)	51	2	(Bangladesh Football Federation) Mohammedan
23	MF	Shamit Shome	5 September 1997 (age 29)	10	1	(United States Soccer Federation) New York Cosmos

==== Indonesia ====
Indonesia announced their final squad on 18 September. Dony Tri Pamungkas withdrew injured and was replaced by Shayne Pattynama on 20 September. Rizky Eka Pratama replaced Yakob Sayuri on 22 September.

Head coach: (England) John Herdman

No.	Pos.	Player	Date of birth (age)	Caps	Goals	Club
1	GK	Emil Audero	18 January 1997 (aged 29)	6	0	(Royal Spanish Football Federation) Rayo Vallecano
2	DF	Kevin Diks (captain)	October 6, 1996 (aged 29)	12	2	(German Football Association) Borussia Mönchengladbach
3	DF	Dion Markx	29 June 2005 (aged 21)	0	0	(Football Association of Indonesia) Persita Tangerang
4	DF	Jordi Amat	21 March 1992 (age 34)	25	2	(Football Association of Indonesia) Persija Jakarta
5	DF	Rizky Ridho	21 November 2001 (aged 24)	57	4	(Football Association of Indonesia) Persija Jakarta
6	MF	Rizky Eka Pratama	24 December 1999 (aged 26)	2	0	(Football Association of Indonesia) PSM Makassar
7	FW	Egy Maulana Vikri	7 July 2000 (aged 26)	35	9	(Football Association of Indonesia) Dewa United Banten
8	FW	Luke Vickery	25 October 2005 (aged 20)	3	1	(Football Australia) Macarthur FC
9	FW	Mitchell Baker	11 December 2006 (aged 19)	4	4	(United States Soccer Federation) Georgetown Hoyas
10	FW	Ole Romeny	20 June 2000 (aged 26)	10	6	(Royal Dutch Football Association) Fortuna Sittard
11	FW	Ragnar Oratmangoen	21 January 1998 (aged 28)	20	4	(Football Association of Indonesia) Persib Bandung
12	GK	Maarten Paes	14 May 1998 (aged 28)	12	0	(Royal Dutch Football Association) Ajax
13	GK	Nadeo Argawinata	9 March 1997 (aged 29)	26	0	(Football Association of Indonesia) Persija Jakarta
14	MF	Joey Pelupessy	May 15, 1993 (aged 33)	10	0	(Royal Belgian Football Association) Lommel
15	MF	Rayhan Hannan	2 April 2004 (aged 22)	6	0	(Football Association of Indonesia) Persija Jakarta
16	DF	Shayne Pattynama	August 11, 1998 (aged 28)	17	2	(Football Association of Indonesia) Persija Jakarta
17	DF	Calvin Verdonk	26 April 1997 (aged 29)	16	0	(French Football Federation) Lille
18	MF	Ivar Jenner	10 January 2004 (aged 22)	29	0	(Football Association of Indonesia) Dewa United Banten
19	MF	Thom Haye	9 February 1995 (aged 31)	22	3	(Football Association of Indonesia) Persib Bandung
20	DF	Elkan Baggott	October 23, 2002 (aged 23)	28	2	(The Football Association) Millwall
21	DF	Dean James	April 30, 2000 (aged 26)	5	0	(Royal Dutch Football Association) Go Ahead Eagles
22	MF	Nathan Tjoe-A-On	22 December 2001 (aged 24)	17	0	(Royal Dutch Football Association) Willem II
23	DF	Justin Hubner	September 14, 2003 (aged 23)	21	1	(Royal Dutch Football Association) Fortuna Sittard

==== Malaysia ====
Malaysia announced their final squad on 17 September. Ezequiel Agüero, Romel Morales and Faris Danish withdrew injured and were replaced by Syahir Bashah, Paulo Josué and Harith Haiqal on 22 September.

Head coach: Tan Cheng Hoe

No.	Pos.	Player	Date of birth (age)	Caps	Goals	Club
1	GK	Azri Ghani	30 April 1999 (aged 27)	8	0	(Football Association of Malaysia) Negeri Sembilan
2	DF	Daniel Ting	1 December 1992 (aged 33)	19	1	(Football Association of Thailand) Ratchaburi
3	DF	Ubaidullah Shamsul Fazili	30 November 2003 (aged 22)	11	0	(Football Association of Malaysia) Terengganu
4	MF	Manuel Hidalgo	3 May 1999 (aged 27)	0	0	(Football Association of Malaysia) Johor Darul Ta'zim
5	DF	Brad Tapp	16 January 2001 (aged 25)	0	0	(Football Association of Malaysia) Johor Darul Ta'zim
6	DF	Quentin Cheng	20 November 1999 (aged 26)	14	0	(Football Association of Malaysia) Selangor
7	FW	Faisal Halim	7 January 1998 (aged 28)	41	18	(Football Association of Malaysia) Selangor
8	MF	Syahir Bashah	16 September 2001 (age 25)	0	0	(Football Association of Malaysia) Selangor
9	FW	Bérgson	9 February 1991 (aged 35)	0	0	(Football Association of Malaysia) Johor Darul Ta'zim
10	FW	Arif Aiman	4 May 2002 (aged 24)	40	8	(Football Association of Malaysia) Johor Darul Ta'zim
11	MF	Hong Wan	17 August 2000 (aged 26)	0	0	(Football Association of Malaysia) Johor Darul Ta'zim
12	MF	Stuart Wilkin	12 March 1998 (aged 28)	33	7	(Football Association of Malaysia) Johor Darul Ta'zim
13	FW	Fergus Tierney	19 March 2003 (aged 23)	6	1	(Cyprus Football Association) Omonia 29M
14	DF	Harith Haiqal	22 June 2002 (aged 22)	10	1	(Football Association of Malaysia) Selangor
15	MF	Nooa Laine	22 November 2002 (aged 23)	20	0	(Football Association of Malaysia) Selangor
16	GK	Syihan Hazmi	22 February 1996 (aged 30)	36	0	(Football Association of Malaysia) Johor Darul Ta'zim
17	FW	G. Pavithran	10 January 2005 (aged 21)	8	1	(Football Association of Malaysia) Terengganu
18	DF	Syahmi Safari	5 February 1998 (aged 28)	26	1	(Football Association of Malaysia) Johor Darul Ta'zim
19	FW	Paulo Josué	13 March 1989 (age 37)	29	10	(Football Association of Malaysia) Kuala Lumpur City
20	MF	Nazmi Faiz	16 August 1994 (aged 32)	25	0	(Football Association of Malaysia) Kuching City
21	DF	Dion Cools (captain)	4 June 1996 (aged 30)	38	6	(Japan Football Association) Cerezo Osaka
22	DF	La'Vere Corbin-Ong	22 April 1991 (aged 35)	49	6	(Football Association of Malaysia) Johor Darul Ta'zim
23	GK	Haziq Nadzli	6 January 1998 (aged 28)	5	0	(Football Association of Malaysia) Kuching City

==== Singapore ====
Singapore announced their final squad on 18 September.

Head coach: Gavin Lee

No.	Pos.	Player	Date of birth (age)	Caps	Goals	Club
1	GK	Izwan Mahbud	14 July 1990 (age 36)	80	0	(Football Association of Singapore) Young Lions
2	DF	Irfan Najeeb	31 July 1999 (age 27)	15	1	(Football Association of Singapore) Tampines Rovers
3	DF	Ryhan Stewart	15 February 2000 (age 26)	39	0	(Football Association of Singapore) Lion City Sailors
4	DF	Nur Adam Abdullah	13 April 2001 (age 25)	19	0	(Football Association of Singapore) Lion City Sailors
5	DF	Raoul Suhaimi	18 September 2005 (age 21)	0	0	(Football Association of Singapore) Tampines Rovers
6	MF	Kyoga Nakamura	25 April 1996 (age 30)	25	2	(Football Association of Singapore) Lion City Sailors
7	MF	Song Ui-young	8 November 1993 (age 32)	39	9	(Football Association of Singapore) Lion City Sailors
8	MF	Shah Shahiran	14 November 1999 (age 26)	47	1	(Football Association of Singapore) Tampines Rovers
9	MF	Farhan Zulkifli	10 November 2002 (age 23)	17	1	(Football Association of Singapore) Lion City Sailors
10	FW	Faris Ramli	24 August 1992 (age 34)	92	15	(Football Association of Singapore) Tampines Rovers
11	MF	Glenn Kweh	26 March 2000 (age 26)	37	2	(Football Association of Singapore) Lion City Sailors
12	GK	Syazwan Buhari	22 September 1992 (age 34)	4	0	(Football Association of Singapore) Tampines Rovers
13	MF	Harhys Stewart	20 March 2001 (age 25)	23	2	(Football Association of Thailand) Chiangrai United
14	DF	Hariss Harun (captain)	19 November 1990 (age 35)	155	11	(Football Association of Singapore) Lion City Sailors
15	DF	Lionel Tan	5 June 1997 (age 29)	34	3	(Football Association of Singapore) Lion City Sailors
16	MF	Hami Syahin	16 December 1998 (age 27)	46	0	(Football Association of Singapore) Lion City Sailors
17	MF	Haziq Kamarudin	6 March 2001 (age 25)	0	0	(Football Association of Singapore) FC Jurong
18	DF	Jacob Mahler	10 April 2000 (age 26)	22	3	(Football Association of Singapore) Tampines Rovers
19	FW	Ilhan Fandi	8 November 2002 (age 23)	31	10	(Football Association of Singapore) Lion City Sailors
20	FW	Shawal Anuar	29 April 1991 (age 35)	58	20	(Football Association of Singapore) Lion City Sailors
21	DF	Safuwan Baharudin	22 September 1991 (age 35)	133	14	(Football Association of Malaysia) Selangor
22	MF	Joel Chew	9 February 2000 (age 26)	11	0	(Football Association of Singapore) Young Lions
23	GK	Ridhuan Barudin	23 March 1987 (age 39)	0	0	(Football Association of Singapore) Hougang United

=== Group B ===
==== Pakistan ====
Pakistan announced their final squad on 19 September 2026.

Head coach: (Peru) Nolberto Solano

No.	Pos.	Player	Date of birth (age)	Caps	Goals	Club
1	GK	Yousuf Butt	18 October 1989 (age 37)	33	0	(Danish Football Association) Ishøj
2	DF	Mohammad Fazal	29 May 2002 (age 24)	9	0	(Swedish Football Association) Nordic United
3	DF	Mohib Ullah	23 May 2005 (age 21)	9	0	(Bhutan Football Federation) Paro
4	DF	Abdullah Iqbal (captain)	27 July 2002 (age 24)	21	0	(Swedish Football Association) Mjällby
5	DF	Easah Suliman	26 January 1998 (age 28)	11	0	(Association of Football Federations of Azerbaijan) Sumgayit
6	DF	Abdullah Shah	6 February 2001 (age 25)	10	0	(Pakistan Football Federation) Mehran
7	FW	Kaleemullah Khan	20 September 1992 (age 34)	27	4	Free agent
8	FW	Abdul Arshad	26 February 2003 (age 23)	14	1	(Danish Football Association) Kolding
9	MF	Hayyaan Khattak	6 October 2003 (age 23)	4	0	(Pakistan Football Federation) POPO
10	MF	Alamgir Ghazi	9 May 2001 (age 25)	22	0	(Pakistan Football Federation) WAPDA
11	FW	Shayak Dost	1 May 2002 (age 24)	20	2	(Bangladesh Football Federation) City Club
12	DF	Mamoon Moosa Khan	28 November 2000 (age 25)	12	0	(Bhutan Football Federation) Paro
13	FW	Ali Khan	16 March 2001 (age 25)	0	0	(Swedish Football Association) Vasalunds
14	DF	Abdul Rehman	25 February 2008 (age 18)	2	0	(Pakistan Football Federation) POPO
15	FW	Umar Nawaz	28 September 2007 (age 19)	4	2	(Football Association of Finland) Kajaanin Haka
16	FW	Syed Ali Raza	6 August 2004 (age 22)	1	0	(Bangladesh Football Federation) Brothers Union
17	MF	Ali Agha	15 May 1997 (age 29)	4	0	(Pakistan Football Federation) Khan Research Laboratories
18	FW	Abdul Samad Khan		0	0	(Association of Football Federations of Azerbaijan) Qarabağ
19	MF	Ali Uzair	14 October 1996 (age 30)	22	0	(Bangladesh Football Federation) Brothers Union
20	GK	Saqib Hanif	23 April 1994 (age 32)	11	0	(Football Association of Maldives) New Radiant
21	DF	Haris Zeb	15 May 2001 (age 25)	6	0	(New Zealand Football) South Island United
22	GK	Hassan Ali	23 February 2003 (age 23)	0	0	(Pakistan Football Federation) WAPDA
23	DF	Ali Khan Niazi	14 December 2000 (age 25)	5	0	(Pakistan Football Federation) SA Gardens

==== Philippines ====
Philippines announced their final squad on 18 September.

Head coach: (Spain) Carles Cuadrat

No.	Pos.	Player	Date of birth (age)	Caps	Goals	Club
1	GK	Kevin Ray Mendoza	29 September 1994 (age 32)	18	0	(Football Association of Thailand) Chonburi
2	DF	Isaiah Alakiu	7 October 2008 (age 18)	0	0	(The Football Association) Brighton & Hove Albion
3	DF	Paul Tabinas	5 July 2002 (age 24)	21	1	(Croatian Football Federation) Dinamo Zagreb
4	DF	Jefferson Tabinas	7 August 1998 (age 28)	27	6	(Football Association of Malaysia) Selangor
5	DF	Jesper Nyholm	10 September 1993 (age 33)	13	1	(Football Association of Thailand) PT Prachuap
6	MF	Sandro Reyes	29 March 2003 (age 23)	35	5	(German Football Association) FC Gütersloh
7	FW	André Leipold	12 November 2001 (age 24)	7	3	(German Football Association) SC Verl
8	MF	Manny Ott (captain)	6 May 1992 (age 34)	72	4	(Football Association of Malaysia) Terengganu
9	FW	Jarvey Gayoso	11 February 1997 (age 29)	38	7	(Football Association of Malaysia) Penang
10	FW	Bjørn Martin Kristensen	4 May 2002 (age 24)	17	13	(Norwegian Football Federation) KFUM Oslo
11	MF	Randy Schneider	27 August 2001 (age 25)	7	1	(Andorran Football Federation) FC Andorra
12	DF	Amani Aguinaldo	24 April 1995 (age 31)	73	0	(Football Association of Brunei Darussalam) DPMM
13	DF	Angelo Brückner	29 April 2003 (age 23)	0	0	(German Football Association) SpVgg Bayreuth
14	MF	Oskari Kekkonen	24 September 1999 (age 27)	21	0	(Football Association of Malaysia) Sabah
15	GK	Michael Falkesgaard	9 April 1991 (age 35)	13	0	(Football Association of Thailand) Port
16	GK	Quincy Kammeraad	1 February 2001 (age 25)	6	0	(Football Association of Malaysia) Kuala Lumpur City
17	MF	Cole Mrowka	26 April 2006 (age 20)	6	1	(United States Soccer Federation) Columbus Crew
18	FW	Sebastian Rasmussen	17 June 2002 (age 24)	14	6	(Danish Football Association) Hobro
19	MF	Zico Bailey	27 August 2000 (age 26)	14	1	(United States Soccer Federation) New Mexico United
20	DF	Scott Woods	7 May 2000 (age 26)	19	0	(Football Federation of Cambodia) Boeung Ket
21	DF	Daisuke Sato	20 September 1994 (age 32)	66	4	(Philippine Football Federation) One Taguig
22	MF	Kenji Nishioka	9 June 2001 (age 25)	6	0	(Football Association of Indonesia) Isenmulang Kalteng
23	MF	Christian Rontini	20 July 1999 (age 27)	29	1	(Italian Football Federation) Antella

==== Thailand ====
Thailand announced their final squad on 14 September. Jonathan Khemdee withdrew injured and was replaced by Peerawat Akkratum on 22 September.

Head coach: Anthony Hudson

No.	Pos.	Player	Date of birth (age)	Caps	Goals	Club
1	GK	Patiwat Khammai	24 December 1994 (aged 31)	31	0	(Football Association of Thailand) Bangkok United
2	DF	Nattapong Sayriya	26 April 1992 (aged 34)	15	0	(Football Association of Thailand) Chonburi
3	DF	Chaiyaphon Otton	4 April 2003 (aged 23)	7	0	(Football Association of Thailand) Port
4	DF	Manuel Bihr	17 September 1993 (aged 33)	31	1	(Football Association of Thailand) Port
5	DF	Peerawat Akkratum	3 December 1998 (aged 27)	1	0	(Football Association of Thailand) Port
6	MF	Sarach Yooyen	30 May 1992 (aged 34)	96	8	(Football Association of Thailand) BG Pathum United
7	MF	Kakana Khamyok	21 May 2004 (aged 22)	9	3	(Football Association of Thailand) Bangkok United
8	MF	Peeradol Chamrasamee	15 September 1992 (aged 34)	40	4	(Football Association of Thailand) Port
9	FW	Supachai Chaided	1 December 1998 (aged 27)	46	8	(Football Association of Thailand) Buriram United
10	MF	Supachok Sarachat	22 May 1998 (aged 28)	49	11	(Japan Football Association) Hokkaido Consadole Sapporo
11	MF	Anan Yodsangwal	9 July 2001 (aged 25)	11	0	(Football Association of Thailand) Buriram United
12	DF	Nicholas Mickelson	24 July 1999 (aged 27)	32	2	(German Football Association) SV Elversberg
13	DF	Waris Choolthong	8 January 2004 (aged 22)	9	1	(Football Association of Thailand) BG Pathum United
14	FW	Teerasak Poeiphimai	21 September 2002 (aged 24)	33	11	(Football Association of Thailand) Port
15	DF	Kritsada Kaman	18 March 1999 (aged 27)	37	1	(Football Association of Thailand) BG Pathum United
16	MF	Iklas Sanron	16 December 2004 (aged 21)	1	0	(Football Association of Thailand) Buriram United
17	FW	Jude Soonsup-Bell	10 January 2004 (aged 22)	6	2	(Football Association of Thailand) Port
18	MF	Chanathip Songkrasin (captain)	5 October 1993 (aged 32)	77	15	(Football Association of Thailand) BG Pathum United
19	MF	Teerapat Pruetong	17 February 2007 (aged 19)	2	0	(Japan Football Association) Hokkaido Consadole Sapporo
20	GK	Saranon Anuin	24 March 1994 (aged 32)	7	0	(Football Association of Thailand) BG Pathum United
21	DF	Suphanan Bureerat	10 October 1993 (aged 32)	39	3	(Football Association of Thailand) Port
22	MF	Seksan Ratree	14 March 2003 (aged 23)	25	8	(Football Association of Thailand) Port
23	GK	Kampol Pathomakkakul	27 July 1992 (aged 34)	18	0	(Football Association of Thailand) Ratchaburi

==== Vietnam ====
Vietnam announced their final squad on 18 September. Nguyễn Thành Chung withdrew injured and was replaced by Khoa Ngo on 19 September. Nguyễn Quang Hải withdrew injured and was replaced by Võ Hoàng Minh Khoa on 22 September.

Head coach: Kim Sang-sik

No.	Pos.	Player	Date of birth (age)	Caps	Goals	Club
1	GK	Patrik Le Giang	8 September 1992 (aged 34)	9	0	(Vietnam Football Federation) Cong An Ho Chi Minh City
2	DF	Lê Ngọc Bảo	27 March 1998 (aged 28)	4	0	(Vietnam Football Federation) Ninh Binh
3	DF	Jason Pendant	9 February 1997 (aged 29)	5	0	(Vietnam Football Federation) Cong An Hanoi
4	MF	Lê Văn Đô	7 August 2001 (aged 25)	3	0	(Vietnam Football Federation) Cong An Hanoi
5	DF	Leygley Adou	9 September 1997 (aged 29)	0	0	(Vietnam Football Federation) Cong An Hanoi
6	DF	Nguyễn Nhật Minh	27 July 2003 (aged 23)	4	0	(Vietnam Football Federation) Cong An Ho Chi Minh City
7	DF	Phạm Xuân Mạnh	27 March 1996 (aged 30)	34	3	(Vietnam Football Federation) Hanoi FC
8	MF	Lê Phạm Thành Long	5 June 1996 (aged 30)	21	0	(Vietnam Football Federation) Cong An Hanoi
9	FW	Nguyễn Đình Bắc	19 August 2004 (aged 22)	22	8	(Vietnam Football Federation) Cong An Hanoi
10	MF	Hêndrio	16 May 1994 (aged 32)	10	3	(Vietnam Football Federation) Hanoi FC
11	FW	Lee Williams	2 April 2007 (aged 19)	0	0	(Vietnam Football Federation) Cong An Ho Chi Minh City
12	FW	Rafaelson	30 March 1997 (aged 29)	17	16	(Vietnam Football Federation) Thep Xanh Nam Dinh
13	FW	Geovane Magno	14 April 1994 (aged 32)	8	0	(Vietnam Football Federation) Ninh Binh
14	MF	Nguyễn Hoàng Đức (captain)	11 January 1998 (aged 28)	65	2	(Vietnam Football Federation) Ninh Binh
15	DF	Trương Tiến Anh	25 April 1999 (aged 27)	29	1	(Vietnam Football Federation) Ninh Binh
16	MF	Khoa Ngo	30 June 2006 (aged 20)	0	0	(Vietnam Football Federation) Cong An Ho Chi Minh City
17	FW	Phạm Gia Hưng	26 April 2000 (aged 26)	6	0	(Vietnam Football Federation) Ninh Binh
18	MF	Nguyễn Hai Long	27 August 2000 (aged 26)	25	7	(Vietnam Football Federation) Hanoi FC
19	MF	Võ Hoàng Minh Khoa	12 March 2001 (aged 25)	2	0	(Vietnam Football Federation) Becamex Ho Chi Minh City
20	DF	Bùi Hoàng Việt Anh	1 January 1999 (aged 27)	30	1	(Vietnam Football Federation) Cong An Hanoi
21	GK	Trần Trung Kiên	9 February 2003 (aged 23)	1	0	(Vietnam Football Federation) Hoang Anh Gia Lai
22	DF	Phan Tuấn Tài	7 January 2001 (aged 25)	22	0	(Vietnam Football Federation) Thể Công–Viettel
23	GK	Nguyễn Văn Việt	12 July 2002 (aged 24)	1	0	(Vietnam Football Federation) Thể Công–Viettel

== FIFA ASEAN Challenge Cup (Division 2) ==
=== Group A ===
==== Brunei ====
Brunei announced their final squad on 18 September. Prior to the start of the tournament, Amirul Aizad Zaidi and Faturrahman Embran were replaced by Hadif Aiman Adanan and Azhari Yusra.

Head coach: Ali Mustafa

No.	Pos.	Player	Date of birth (age)	Caps	Goals	Club
1	GK	Haimie Abdullah Nyaring	31 May 1998 (age 28)	32	0	(Football Association of Brunei Darussalam) DPMM
2	DF	Azrin Danial Yusra	11 February 2006 (age 20)	0	0	(Football Association of Brunei Darussalam) DPMM II
3	MF	Wafiq Danish Hasimulabdillah	13 January 2005 (age 21)	0	0	(Football Association of Brunei Darussalam) Kasuka
4	MF	Hanif Farhan Azman	2 November 2000 (age 26)	15	0	(Football Association of Brunei Darussalam) MS ABDB
5	DF	Nur Ikhwan Othman	15 January 1993 (age 33)	27	2	(Football Association of Brunei Darussalam) DPMM
6	DF	Wafi Aminuddin	20 August 2000 (age 26)	19	1	(Football Association of Brunei Darussalam) Kasuka
7	MF	Azwan Ali Rahman (captain)	11 January 1992 (age 34)	32	9	(Football Association of Brunei Darussalam) DPMM
8	FW	Nazirrudin Ismail	27 December 1998 (age 27)	26	2	(Football Association of Brunei Darussalam) MS PPDB
9	FW	Hariz Danial Khallidden	1 November 1996 (age 30)	18	0	(Football Association of Brunei Darussalam) MS ABDB
10	FW	Hakeme Yazid Said	8 February 2003 (age 23)	25	4	(Football Association of Brunei Darussalam) DPMM
11	MF	Haziq Naqiuddin Syamra	26 May 2004 (age 22)	6	0	(Football Association of Brunei Darussalam) DPMM II
12	FW	Ali Munawwar Abdul Rahman	30 June 2004 (age 22)	1	0	(Football Association of Brunei Darussalam) MS ABDB
13	FW	Azhari Yusra	30 June 2003 (age 23)	0	0	(Football Association of Brunei Darussalam) Indera
14	MF	Haziq Kasyful	24 December 1998 (age 27)	16	0	(Football Association of Brunei Darussalam) Kasuka
15	MF	Hadif Aiman Adanan	19 October 2001 (age 25)	0	0	(Football Association of Brunei Darussalam) MS ABDB
16	MF	Abdul Hariz Herman	24 September 2000 (age 26)	19	1	(Football Association of Brunei Darussalam) DPMM
17	FW	Hanif Aiman Adanan	4 March 2000 (age 26)	1	0	(Football Association of Brunei Darussalam) Kasuka
18	GK	Ishyra Asmin Jabidi	9 July 1998 (age 28)	3	0	(Football Association of Brunei Darussalam) DPMM
19	FW	Alinur Rashimy Jufri	12 June 2000 (age 26)	16	0	(Football Association of Brunei Darussalam) Kasuka
20	GK	Jefri Syafiq Ishak	21 May 2002 (age 24)	1	0	(Football Association of Brunei Darussalam) DPMM II
21	DF	Hanif Hamir	22 February 1997 (age 29)	27	0	(Football Association of Brunei Darussalam) DPMM
22	DF	Nazry Aiman Azaman	1 July 2004 (age 22)	13	1	(Football Association of Brunei Darussalam) DPMM
23	FW	Sahfiq Hidayat Sahrizam	8 September 2002 (age 24)	0	0	(Football Association of Brunei Darussalam) DPMM II

==== Hong Kong ====
Hong Kong announced their final squad on 18 September.

Head coach: (Spain) Roberto Losada

No.	Pos.	Player	Date of birth (age)	Caps	Goals	Club
1	GK	Pong Cheuk Hei	31 January 2004 (age 22)	3	0	(Football Association of Hong Kong, China) Kitchee
2	DF	Tsui Wang Kit	5 January 1997 (age 29)	28	1	(Chinese Football Association) Yunnan Yukun
3	DF	Oliver Gerbig	12 December 1998 (age 27)	31	0	(Chinese Football Association) Henan
4	DF	Vas Nuñez	22 November 1995 (age 30)	17	0	(Chinese Football Association) Yanbian Longding
5	DF	Dudu	17 April 1990 (age 36)	7	1	(Football Association of Hong Kong, China) Kitchee
6	MF	Tan Chun Lok	15 January 1996 (age 30)	62	3	(Football Association of Hong Kong, China) Kitchee
7	MF	Juninho	11 December 1990 (age 35)	26	5	(Football Association of Hong Kong, China) Kitchee
8	MF	Ngan Cheuk Pan	22 January 1998 (age 28)	25	0	(Chinese Football Association) Qingdao Hainiu
9	FW	Matt Orr	1 January 1997 (age 29)	48	13	(Chinese Football Association) Shanghai Port
10	MF	Sohgo Ichikawa	30 July 2004 (age 22)	3	0	(Football Association of Hong Kong, China) Lee Man
11	FW	Everton Camargo	25 May 1991 (age 35)	26	12	(Football Association of Hong Kong, China) Kitchee
12	MF	Wu Chun Ming	21 November 1997 (age 28)	24	0	(Football Association of Hong Kong, China) Lee Man
13	DF	Kam Chi Kin	6 March 2004 (age 22)	3	0	(Football Association of Hong Kong, China) Kitchee
14	FW	Poon Pui Hin	3 October 2000 (age 26)	16	3	(Football Association of Hong Kong, China) Southern
15	DF	Chan Yun Tung	7 July 2002 (age 24)	0	0	(Football Association of Hong Kong, China) Lee Man
16	MF	Chan Siu Kwan	1 August 1992 (age 34)	35	7	(Football Association of Hong Kong, China) Tai Po
17	DF	Callum Beattie	28 August 2001 (age 25)	0	0	(Football Association of Hong Kong, China) Kitchee
18	GK	Tse Ka Wing	4 September 1999 (age 27)	10	0	(Football Association of Hong Kong, China) Tai Po
19	GK	Yip Ka Yu	24 December 1996 (age 29)	0	0	(Football Association of Hong Kong, China) Rangers
20	FW	Ng Yu Hei	13 February 2006 (age 20)	9	1	(Chinese Football Association) Chongqing Tonglianglong
21	DF	Yue Tze Nam	12 May 1998 (age 28)	41	0	(Chinese Football Association) Beijing Guoan
22	FW	Raphaël Merkies	15 April 2002 (age 24)	10	5	(Chinese Football Association) Shandong Taishan
23	FW	Sun Ming Him	19 June 2000 (age 26)	45	2	(Chinese Football Association) Tianjin Jinmen Tiger

==== Laos ====
Laos announced their final squad on 18 September.

Head coach: (Serbia) Vladica Grujic

No.	Pos.	Player	Date of birth (age)	Caps	Goals	Club
1	GK	Souksamone Vethita	13 August 2007 (age 19)	0	0	(Lao Football Federation) Salavan United
2	DF	Phoutthavong Sangvilay	16 October 2004 (age 22)	30	3	(Lao Football Federation) Ezra
3	DF	Phahatxay Keomany	27 April 2006 (age 20)	1	0	(Lao Football Federation) BIS
4	DF	Seng-athit Manilay	29 July 2008 (age 18)	0	0	(Lao Football Federation) Ezra
5	DF	Alounxay Thepsouvanh	12 October 2008 (age 18)	0	0	(Lao Football Federation) Changphuak
6	MF	Phouluang Vinnavong	12 January 2005 (age 21)	0	0	(Lao Football Federation) Champasak Avenir
7	MF	Khonesavanh Keonuchanh	4 June 2004 (age 22)	2	0	(Italian Football Federation) Rome City Institute
8	MF	Damoth Thongkhamsavath	3 April 2004 (age 22)	20	2	(Vietnam Football Federation) Thanh Hoa
9	FW	Kydavone Souvanny	22 December 1999 (age 26)	21	4	(Lao Football Federation) Mazda GB
10	MF	Roman Angot	2 March 2001 (age 25)	2	0	(German Football Association) SV Linx
11	FW	Bounchay Chernvanglien	28 December 2006 (age 19)	4	1	(Lao Football Federation) Namtha United
12	GK	Xaysomphong Thipphavong	25 March 2008 (age 18)	0	0	(Lao Football Federation) Mazda GB
13	MF	Sonexay Xaykhampheng	4 August 2007 (age 19)	0	0	(Lao Football Federation) Army
14	FW	Thavisok Latsavong	23 December 2007 (age 18)	0	0	(Lao Football Federation) Army
15	GK	Anoulak Vilaphone	15 February 2001 (age 25)	0	0	(Lao Football Federation) Mazda GB
16	DF	Xayasith Singsavang	13 December 2000 (age 25)	15	0	(Lao Football Federation) Champasak Avenir
17	FW	Bounphachan Bounkong (captain)	29 November 2000 (age 25)	36	8	(Lao Football Federation) Young Elephants
18	MF	Chansamone Phetsomphone	19 February 2007 (age 19)	0	0	(Lao Football Federation) Champasak Avenir
19	FW	Somvang Choummaly	2 April 2006 (age 20)	1	0	(Lao Football Federation) Mazda GB
20	DF	Sonesanith Phommachanh	11 November 2002 (age 23)	1	0	(Lao Football Federation) Mazda GB
21	DF	Chekky Inthisone	2 June 2008 (age 18)	0	0	(Lao Football Federation) BIS
22	DF	Bounthasak Chandala	25 November 2009 (age 16)	0	0	(Lao Football Federation) Army
23	DF	Anoulak Singsavang	21 September 2009 (age 17)	0	0	(Lao Football Federation) Salavan United

=== Group B ===
==== Cambodia ====
Cambodia announced their final squad on 18 September. Mon Rado and Taing Bunchhai withdrew injured and was replaced by Ouk Sovann and Choun Chanchav on 22 September.

Head coach: (Japan) Koji Gyotoku

No.	Pos.	Player	Date of birth (age)	Caps	Goals	Club
1	GK	Keo Soksela	1 August 1997 (age 29)	25	0	(Football Federation of Cambodia) Visakha
21	GK	Vireak Dara	30 October 2003 (age 23)	9	0	(Football Federation of Cambodia) PKR Svay Rieng
22	GK	Reth Lyheng	1 January 2004 (age 22)	2	0	(Football Federation of Cambodia) Nagaworld
2	DF	Choun Chanchav	5 May 1999 (age 27)	17	2	(Football Federation of Cambodia) Phnom Penh Crown
3	DF	Takaki Ose	19 October 1995 (age 31)	7	0	(Football Federation of Cambodia) PKR Svay Rieng
5	DF	Hikaru Mizuno	2 August 1991 (age 35)	12	0	(Football Federation of Cambodia) Kirivong Sok Sen Chey
12	DF	Ouk Sovann	15 May 1998 (age 28)	22	1	(Football Federation of Cambodia) Visakha
13	DF	Sareth Krya (Captain)	3 March 1996 (age 30)	41	2	(Football Federation of Cambodia) PKR Svay Rieng
18	DF	Phat Sokha	2 March 2003 (age 23)	5	0	(Football Federation of Cambodia) Nagaworld
20	DF	Cheng Meng	27 February 1998 (age 28)	29	0	(Football Federation of Cambodia) Visakha
23	DF	Sor Rotana	9 October 2002 (age 24)	18	2	(Football Federation of Cambodia) Visakha
4	MF	Alisher Mirzaev	11 April 1996 (age 30)	4	0	(Football Federation of Cambodia) MOI Kompong Dewa
6	MF	Yudai Ogawa	4 October 1996 (age 30)	23	2	(Football Federation of Cambodia) ISI Dangkor Senchey
7	MF	Iago Bento	15 January 1999 (age 27)	4	1	(Football Federation of Cambodia) Boeung Ket
8	MF	Bong Samuel	25 September 2005 (age 21)	11	1	(Football Federation of Cambodia) Phnom Penh Crown
11	MF	Sin Kakada	29 July 2000 (age 26)	13	1	(Football Federation of Cambodia) Visakha
15	MF	Min Ratanak	30 July 2002 (age 24)	17	3	(Football Federation of Cambodia) PKR Svay Rieng
16	MF	Kim Sokyuth	21 June 1999 (age 27)	13	0	(Football Federation of Cambodia) PKR Svay Rieng
9	FW	Sieng Chanthea	9 September 2002 (age 24)	49	9	(Football Federation of Cambodia) PKR Svay Rieng
10	FW	Andrés Nieto	29 April 1996 (age 30)	8	1	(Football Federation of Cambodia) Visakha
14	FW	Hav Soknet	3 August 2003 (age 23)	9	3	(Football Federation of Cambodia) Visakha
17	FW	Sa Ty	4 April 2002 (age 24)	27	2	(Football Federation of Cambodia) Phnom Penh Crown
19	FW	Nhean Sosidan	11 October 2002 (age 24)	18	1	(Football Federation of Cambodia) PKR Svay Rieng

==== Myanmar ====
Myanmar announced their final squad on 21 September.

Head coach: (Norway) Jørn Andersen

No.	Pos.	Player	Date of birth (age)	Caps	Goals	Club
	GK	Sann Satt Naing	4 November 1997 (age 28)	21	0	(Myanmar Football Federation) Yangon United
	GK	Zin Nyi Nyi Aung	6 June 2000 (age 26)	10	0	(Myanmar Football Federation) Yangon United
	GK	Nay Lin Htet	23 April 2002 (age 24)	1	0	(Myanmar Football Federation) Hantharwaddy United
	DF	Soe Moe Kyaw	23 March 1999 (age 27)	61	4	(Football Association of Thailand) Uthai Thani
	DF	Hein Ze Yar Lin	12 August 2000 (age 26)	47	0	(Myanmar Football Federation) Yangon United
	DF	Zwe Khant Min	20 June 2000 (age 26)	19	0	(Myanmar Football Federation) Yangon City
	DF	Myat Phone Khant	12 October 2006 (age 20)	4	0	(Myanmar Football Federation) Thitsar Arman
	DF	Phyo Pyae Sone	28 June 2005 (age 21)	2	0	(Myanmar Football Federation) Shan United
	MF	Lwin Moe Aung	10 December 1999 (age 26)	61	6	(Myanmar Football Federation) Shan United
	MF	Kyaw Min Oo	16 June 1996 (age 30)	47	2	(Myanmar Football Federation) Shan United
	MF	Wai Lin Aung	30 July 1999 (age 27)	44	1	(Football Association of Malaysia) Negeri Sembilan
	MF	Myat Kaung Khant	15 July 2000 (age 26)	35	2	(Myanmar Football Federation) Yangon City
	MF	Zaw Win Thein	1 March 2003 (age 23)	25	1	(Myanmar Football Federation) Yangon United
	MF	Ye Yint Aung	22 March 2000 (age 26)	24	1	(Myanmar Football Federation) Shan United
	MF	Aung Myo Khant	6 May 2001 (age 25)	5	0	(Myanmar Football Federation) Yangon United
	MF	Moe Swe	31 May 2003 (age 23)	0	0	(Myanmar Football Federation) Yadanarbon
	MF	Kaung Khant Kyaw	26 February 2007 (age 19)	0	0	(Myanmar Football Federation) Yangon United
	FW	Than Paing	6 December 1996 (age 29)	63	9	(Myanmar Football Federation) Yangon United
	FW	Win Naing Tun	3 May 2000 (age 26)	50	12	(Myanmar Football Federation) Yangon City
	FW	Hein Htet Aung	5 October 2001 (age 25)	44	1	(Football Association of Malaysia) Melaka
	FW	Khun Kyaw Zin Hein	15 July 2002 (age 24)	13	1	(Myanmar Football Federation) Yangon City
	FW	Shine Wanna Aung	15 March 2006 (age 20)	3	1	(Myanmar Football Federation) Thitsar Arman
	FW	Pyae Sone Aung		0	0	(Myanmar Football Federation) Thitsar Arman

==== Timor-Leste ====
Timor-Leste announced their final squad on 10 September. Freteliano, Paulo Gusmão, and Natalino da Costa replaced Zenivio, Santiago da Costa, and Gali Freitas on 24 September.

Head coach: (Portugal) Zé Pedro

No.	Pos.	Player	Date of birth (age)	Caps	Goals	Club
1	GK	Dylan Niski	1 March 2000 (aged 26)	8	0	(Football Australia) Western City Rangers
2	DF	Jackson Fowler	3 September 2004 (aged 22)	6	0	(Football Australia) Valentine
3	DF	Eric Silva	10 July 2002 (aged 24)	5	0	(Portuguese Football Federation) Sesimbra
4	DF	Anizo Correia	23 May 2003 (aged 23)	26	0	(East Timor Football Federation) AD Santo António
5	MF	Palomito Ribeiro	14 June 2005 (aged 21)	3	0	(East Timor Football Federation) AD Santo António
6	DF	João Varudo	6 June 1992 (aged 34)	3	0	(Portuguese Football Federation) AD Bobadelense
7	DF	Luís Figo	17 April 2005 (aged 21)	15	0	(East Timor Football Federation) AD Santo António
8	MF	Claudio Osorio	26 September 2002 (aged 23)	20	1	(Portuguese Football Federation) O Elvas
9	FW	Olagar Xavier	18 May 2003 (aged 23)	19	1	(East Timor Football Federation) Karketu Dili
10	FW	João Pedro	24 June 1998 (aged 28)	28	8	(Football Association of Malaysia) Kuching City
11	MF	Freteliano	9 August 2004 (aged 22)	13	0	(East Timor Football Federation) Santa Cruz
12	GK	Alexandre Lima	3 November 2005 (age 20)	0	0	(East Timor Football Federation) Santa Cruz
13	MF	Tristan Arrarte	26 July 2008 (aged 18)	7	0	(Football Australia) Western Sydney Wanderers
14	FW	Zion Cruz	18 April 2001 (aged 25)	8	1	(Portuguese Football Federation) Lusitano FCV
15	FW	Paulo Gusmão	24 August 2003 (aged 23)	0	0	(East Timor Football Federation) Santa Cruz
16	DF	Ryan Jom	3 March 2005 (aged 21)	8	0	(Football Australia) Canterbury Bankstown
17	DF	Liam Farrugia	13 January 2003 (aged 23)	8	0	(Malta Football Association) Naxxar Lions
18	DF	Juvito Moniz	8 December 2003 (aged 22)	3	0	(East Timor Football Federation) Santa Cruz
19	FW	Alexandro Bakhito	1 June 2006 (aged 20)	12	1	(East Timor Football Federation) Karketu Dili
20	GK	Egidio Lurio	5 December 2008 (aged 17)	0	0	(East Timor Football Federation) Karketu Dili
21	MF	Natalino da Costa	3 August 2003 (aged 23)	1	0	(East Timor Football Federation) Karketu Dili
22	FW	Vabio Canavaro	25 January 2007 (aged 19)	6	0	(Croatian Football Federation) Kamen Podbablje
23	FW	Oatnasio da Silva	11 June 2006 (aged 20)	5	2	(Irish Football Association) Portadown

== Statistics ==
Note: Only the final squad list of each national team is taken into consideration.

=== Age ===
==== Outfield players ====
- Oldest: Paulo Josué (Malaysia) (37 years, 195 days)
- Youngest: Bounthasak Chandala (Laos) (16 years, 302 days)

==== Goalkeepers ====
- Oldest: Ridhuan Barudin (Singapore) (39 years, 185 days)
- Youngest: Xaysomphong Thipphavong (Laos) (17 years, 183 days)

==== Captains ====
- Oldest: Jamal Bhuyan (Bangladesh) (36 years, 167 days)
- Youngest: Abdullah Iqbal (Pakistan) (24 years, 59 days)

==== Coaches ====
- Oldest: Thomas Dooley (Bangladesh) (65 years, 135 days)
- Youngest: Gavin Lee (Singapore) (36 years, 16 days)

=== Player representation by country confederation ===
Confederation	Players	Percentage
AFC	274	85.09%
UEFA	42	13.04%
CONCACAF	4	1.24%
OFC	1	0.31%

=== Player representation by league system ===
Nation in bold are represented at the tournament.

Country	Players	Percentage	Outside national squad	Lower tier players
**Malaysia**	36	11.18%	17	0
**Thailand**	26	8.07%	6	0
**Cambodia**	24	7.45%	1	0
**Vietnam**	24	7.45%	1	1
**Singapore**	21	6.52%	0	0
**Laos**	20	6.21%	0	1
**Myanmar**	20	6.21%	0	0
**Bangladesh**	19	5.90%	3	0
**Brunei**	15	4.66%	0	0
**Hong Kong**	14	4.35%	0	0
**Indonesia**	13	4.04%	2	0
**Timor-Leste**	12	3.73%	0	0
China	9	2.80%	9	1
**Pakistan**	7	2.17%	0	3
England	6	1.86%	6	5
Germany	6	1.86%	6	4
Australia	5	1.55%	5	3
Netherlands	5	1.55%	5	0
Portugal	4	1.24%	4	4
United States	4	1.24%	4	3
Bhutan	3	0.93%	3	0
Denmark	3	0.93%	3	3
Italy	3	0.93%	3	3
Japan	3	0.93%	3	2
Sweden	3	0.93%	3	2
Azerbaijan	2	0.62%	2	0
Croatia	2	0.62%	2	1
Spain	2	0.62%	2	1
Belgium	1	0.31%	1	0
Cyprus	1	0.31%	1	0
France	1	0.31%	1	0
Maldives	1	0.31%	1	0
Malta	1	0.31%	1	1
New Zealand	1	0.31%	1	0
Northern Ireland	1	0.31%	1	0
Norway	1	0.31%	1	0
**Philippines**	1	0.31%	0	0
United Arab Emirates	1	0.31%	1	1
Free agent	1	0.31%	—	—
**Total**	**322**	**100%**	**99 (30.75%)**	**39 (12.11%)**

=== Coaches representation by country ===
Coaches in bold represented their own country.

Number	Country	Coaches
2	England	John Herdman (Indonesia) Anthony Hudson (Thailand)
1	Brunei	**Ali Mustafa**
1	Japan	Koji Gyotoku (Cambodia)
1	Hong Kong	**Roberto Losada**
1	Malaysia	**Tan Cheng Hoe**
1	Norway	Jørn Andersen (Myanmar)
1	Peru	Nolberto Solano (Pakistan)
1	Portugal	Zé Pedro (Timor Leste)
1	Singapore	**Gavin Lee**
1	Serbia	Vladica Grujic (Laos)
1	South Korea	Kim Sang-sik (Vietnam)
1	Spain	Carles Cuadrat (Philippines)
1	United States	Thomas Dooley (Bangladesh)
