= Rizky Eka Pratama =

Indonesian footballer

Personal information
- Full name: Muhammad Rizky Eka Pratama
- Date of birth: 24 December 1999 (age 26)
- Place of birth: Bone, Indonesia
- Height: 1.71 m (5 ft 7 in)
- Position: Winger

Team information
- Current team: PSM Makassar
- Number: 24

Youth career
- 2017–2019: PSM Makassar

Senior career*
Years	Team	Apps	(Gls)
2019–	PSM Makassar	169	(4)

International career^{‡}
2026–	Indonesia	2	(0)
Medal record
Men's football
Representing Indonesia
FIFA ASEAN Cup
Winner	2026 Indonesia	Team
- * Club domestic league appearances and goals as of 19 September 2026 ‡ National team caps and goals as of 7 August 2026

Muhammad Rizky Eka Pratama (born 24 December 1999) is an Indonesian professional footballer who plays as a winger for Super League club PSM Makassar and the Indonesia national team.

== Club career ==
=== PSM Makassar ===
He was signed for PSM Makassar to play in Liga 1 in the 2019 season. Rizky Eka made his debut on 27 September 2019 in a match against Persipura Jayapura. On 18 November 2019, Rizky scored his first goal for PSM against Persipura Jayapura in the 34th minute at the Andi Mattalatta Stadium, Makassar.

== International career ==
In November 2019, Rizky was named as Indonesia U-20 All Stars squad, to play in U-20 International Cup held in Bali.

== Career statistics ==
=== Club ===
As of match played 19 September 2026

Club	Season	League			Cup		Continental (Note: Appearances in AFC Cup)		Other		Total	
Club	Season	Division	Apps	Goals	Apps	Goals	Apps	Goals	Apps	Goals	Apps	Goals
PSM Makassar	2019	Liga 1	22	1	0	0	0	0	0	0	22	1
PSM Makassar	2020	Liga 1	1	0	0	0	3	0	0	0	4	0
PSM Makassar	2021–22	Liga 1	26	0	0	0	0	0	6 (Note: Appearances in Menpora Cup)	0	32	0
PSM Makassar	2022–23	Liga 1	28	0	0	0	4	1	4 (Note: Appearances in Indonesia President's Cup)	0	36	1
PSM Makassar	2023–24	Liga 1	28	1	0	0	4	0	0	0	32	1
PSM Makassar	2024–25	Liga 1	33	1	0	0	–		7 (Note: Appearances in ASEAN Club Championship)	0	40	1
PSM Makassar	2025–26	Super League	26	1	0	0	–		0	0	26	1
PSM Makassar	2026–27	Super League	3	0	0	0	–		0	0	3	0
Career total			167	4	0	0	11	1	17	0	195	5

=== International ===
As of match played 7 August 2026

Appearances and goals by national team and year
National team	Year	Apps	Goals
Indonesia	2026	2	0
Total		2	0

== Honours ==
PSM Makassar

- Liga 1: 2022–23
- Piala Indonesia: 2019

Indonesia

- FIFA ASEAN Cup: 2026

Individual

- Super League Assist of the Month: September 2025
- Super League Goal of the Month: February 2026
