= Nattapong Sayriya =

Thai footballer (born 1992)

Personal information
- Full name: Nattapong Sayriya
- Date of birth: 17 January 1992 (age 34)
- Place of birth: Phuket, Thailand
- Height: 1.80 m (5 ft 11 in)
- Position: Centre back

Team information
- Current team: Chonburi
- Number: 37

Senior career*
Years	Team	Apps	(Gls)
2014–2015	Chamchuri United	19	(0)
2016–2025	Nakhon Ratchasima	182	(2)
2025–	Chonburi	22	(0)

International career^{‡}
2025–	Thailand	18	(0)
Medal record
Men's football
Representing Thailand
FIFA ASEAN Cup
Runner-up	2026 Indonesia	Team
ASEAN Championship
Runner-up	Hyundai Cup 2026	Team
- * Club domestic league appearances and goals as of 06:03, 9 April 2026 (UTC) ‡ National team caps and goals as of 5 October 2026

Nattapong Sayriya (Thai: ณัฐพงษ์ สายริยา, born 17 January 1992) is a Thai professional footballer who currently plays for Chonburi in the Thai League 1 and the Thailand national team.

== International career ==
At the age of 33, Nattapong was called up to the Thailand national team for the first time by head coach Masatada Ishii, joining the squad for the 2025 King's Cup. He started in both the 3–0 win against Fiji in the semi-final and the 0–1 loss against Iraq in the final.

== Honours ==
Nakhon Ratchasima

- Thai League 2: 2023–24

Thailand

- FIFA ASEAN Cup runner-up: 2026
- King's Cup:2026
