= Pocholo Bugas =

Filipino footballer (born 2001)

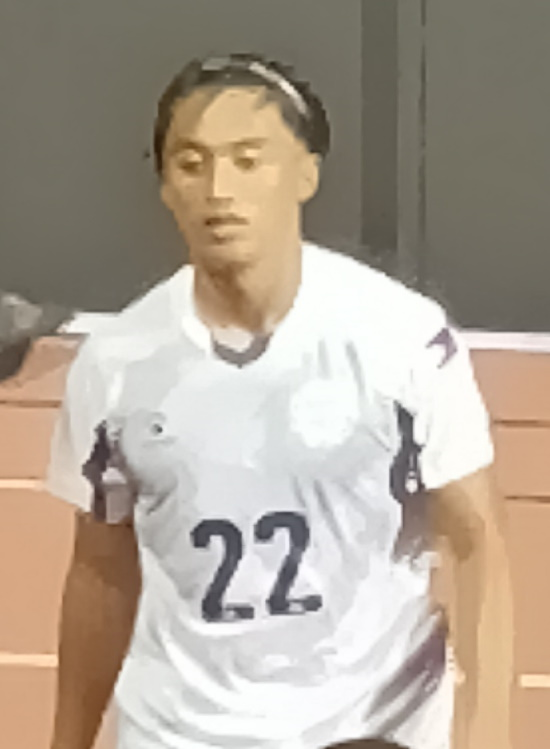
- Bugas with the Philippines at the 2022 AFF Championship

Personal information
- Full name: Pocholo Arellano Bugas
- Date of birth: 3 December 2001 (age 24)
- Place of birth: Tagum, Philippines
- Positions: Winger; wing-back

Team information
- Current team: Vukovar 1991
- Number: 39

Youth career
- –2020: Far Eastern University

Senior career*
Years	Team	Apps	(Gls)
2020–2023	United City	13	(2)
2023	Azkals Development Team	4	(1)
2023–2025	Angkor Tiger	26	(5)
2025	→ Kaya–Iloilo (loan)	6	(0)
2025–	Vukovar 1991	3	(0)

International career^{‡}
2019	Philippines U18	5	(2)
2019–	Philippines U23	2	(0)
2022–	Philippines	19	(0)
- * Club domestic league appearances and goals as of 15 June 2026 ‡ National team caps and goals as of 8 August 2026

Pocholo Arellano Bugas (born 3 December 2001) is a Filipino professional footballer who plays as a winger or a wing-back for Croatian HNL club Vukovar 1991 and for the Philippines national team.

== Personal life ==
He is the brother of Filipino international footballer Paolo Bugas.

== Club career ==
=== United City ===
In August 2020, Bugas signed his first professional contract with United City. He made his professional debut in a 6–0 win against Mendiola coming in as a substitute, replacing Hikaru Minegishi in the 73rd minute.

== International career ==
=== Philippines U18 ===
In August 2019, Bugas was called up to the Philippines U18 for the 2019 AFF U-18 Youth Championship in Vietnam. He scored his first goal for the U18 team in a 5–2 defeat against Timor-Leste U18. He scored his second goal against Brunei U18.

=== Philippines U23 ===
Bugas was called up to represent the Philippines U23 in the 2019 Southeast Asian Games held in the Philippines. He made his debut for the U23 team in a 2–1 defeat against Myanmar U23, coming in as a substitute, replacing Edison Suerti in the 43rd minute.

In February 2022, Bugas was once again, called up to the Philippines U23 for the 2022 AFF U-23 Youth Championship held in Cambodia.

=== Philippines ===
In December 2022, he made his debut for the Philippines in a friendly against Vietnam, ending in a loss.

== Career statistics ==
=== Club ===
As of 26 December 2022

Club	Season	League			Cup		Continental		Other		Total	
Club	Season	Division	Apps	Goals	Apps	Goals	Apps	Goals	Apps	Goals	Apps	Goals
United City	2020	PFL	2	0	–		0	0	0	0	2	0
United City	2021	PFL	–		0	0	5 (Note: Appearances in the AFC Champions League)	0	0	0	5	0
United City	2022–23	PFL	11	2	3	0	3	0	0	0	17	2
Career total			13	2	3	0	8	0	0	0	24	0

== Honours ==
United City

- Copa Paulino Alcantara: 2022
