= Angelo Brückner =

Filipino footballer

Personal information
- Date of birth: 29 April 2003 (age 23)
- Place of birth: Munich, Germany
- Height: 1.73 m (5 ft 8 in)
- Positions: Full-back; defensive midfielder

Youth career
- SV Neuperlach
- 2016–2017: SpVgg Unterhaching
- 2017–2022: Bayern Munich

Senior career*
Years	Team	Apps	(Gls)
2021–2025	Bayern Munich II	95	(0)
2023–2024	→ TSV Hartberg (loan)	11	(0)
2026	SpVgg Bayreuth	10	(0)

International career^{‡}
2019	Germany U17	4	(0)
2022	Germany U19	1	(0)
2026–	Philippines	1	(0)
- * Club domestic league appearances and goals as of 28 June 2026 ‡ National team caps and goals as of 9:14, 5 October 2026 (UTC)

Angelo Brückner (born 29 April 2003) is a professional footballer who plays as a full-back and defensive midfielder. Born in Germany, he plays for the Philippines national team.

== Club career ==
=== Bayern Munich ===
Brückner is a youth product of SV Neuperlach and SpVgg Unterhaching; he then moved to Bayern Munich's youth academy in 2017. On 19 February 2021, he signed his first professional contract with Bayern Munich until 2024. He began his senior career with Bayern Munich II in 2021, and first trained with the senior team in January 2022. On 21 December 2022, he extended his contract with the club until 2025. Following the end of the 2024–25 season, Brückner's contract was not renewed and he became a free agent.

==== Loan to TSV Hartberg ====
On 1 September 2023, he joined TSV Hartberg in the Austrian Bundesliga on a season-long loan for the 2023–24 season.

=== SpVgg Bayreuth ===
Brückner signed with Regionalliga Bayern club SpVgg Bayreuth as a free agent, on 3 February 2026.

== International career ==
Born in Germany, Brückner is of Filipino descent. He is a youth international for Germany, having played for the U17s and U19s.

Brückner made his debut with the Philippines national team in the 2026 FIFA ASEAN Cup.

== Career statistics ==
=== Club ===
As of match played 13 March 2026

Appearances and goals by club, season and competition
Club	Season	League			National cup		Other		Total	
Club	Season	Division	Apps	Goals	Apps	Goals	Apps	Goals	Apps	Goals
Bayern Munich II	2021–22	Regionalliga Bayern	33	0	—		—		33	0
Bayern Munich II	2022–23	Regionalliga Bayern	31	0	—		—		31	0
Bayern Munich II	2023–24	Regionalliga Bayern	7	0	—		—		0	0
Bayern Munich II	2024–25	Regionalliga Bayern	24	0	—		—		24	0
Bayern Munich II	Total		95	0	—		—		95	0
TSV Hartberg (loan)	2023–24	Austrian Bundesliga	11	0	2 (Note: Appearance(s) in Austrian Cup)	0	0	0	13	0
TSV Hartberg (loan)	Total		11	0	2	0	0	0	13	0
SpVgg Bayreuth	2025–26	Regionalliga Bayern	2	0	—		0	0	2	0
SpVgg Bayreuth	Total		2	0	0	0	0	0	2	0
Career total			108	0	2	0	0	0	110	0
