= Gavin Muens =

Filipino footballer (born 2004)

Personal information
- Full name: Gavin Alonzo Muens
- Date of birth: 24 October 2004 (age 22)
- Place of birth: Corpus Christi, Texas, United States
- Height: 6 ft 2 in (1.87 m)
- Position: Midfielder

Team information
- Current team: Kowloon City
- Number: 3

Youth career
- –2016: West Sound FC
- 2016–2018: Washington Premier FC
- 2018–2020: Seattle Sounders

College career
| Years | Team | Apps | (Gls) |
| 2024 | Washington Huskies | 0 | (0) |

Senior career*
| Years | Team | Apps | (Gls) |
| 2022–2023 | ADC | 4 | (1) |
| 2023–2024 | FC Schweinfurt 05 | 1 | (0) |
| 2024–2026 | Kaya–Iloilo | 12 | (0) |
| 2024 | → One Taguig (loan) | 3 | (0) |
| 2026– | Kowloon City | 3 | (1) |

International career^{‡}
| 2022 | Philippines U20 | 3 | (0) |
| 2023– | Philippines U22 | 8 | (0) |
| 2023– | Philippines U23 | 11 | (1) |
| 2023– | Philippines | 4 | (0) |
- * Club domestic league appearances and goals ‡ National team caps and goals as of 8 November 2026

Gavin Alonzo Muens (German pronunciation: [Müns]) (born 24 October 2004) is a professional footballer who currently plays as a midfielder for Hong Kong Premier League club Kowloon City. Born in the United States, he plays for the Philippines national team.

== Personal life ==
Muens was born in Corpus Christi, Texas, to a German father and Filipino mother.

== Club career ==
=== Youth ===
Muens began his youth career in Washington State at local club West Sound FC before joining Washington Premier in 2020.

=== Senior ===
Muens made three appearances for ADT in the Philippines Football League, scoring one goal. Muens signed for FC Schweinfurt 05 for the 2023–24 season. He made his début as a substitute on 4 November 2023 against SV Schalding-Heining.

On 10 October 2026, Muens joined Hong Kong Premier League club Kowloon City.

== International career ==
In 2023, Muens was called up to the Philippines U22 squad for the 2023 SEA Games, playing in all four group games. He retained his place in the squad for the Asian Cup Qualifiers later that year in Thailand, scoring against Bangladesh at Chonburi Stadium.

He is the second youngest debutant on the senior national team where he earned his first cap versus Jordan at Al Janoub Stadium in Qatar.

Muens was recalled to the full national set-up in July 2026 for the 2026 ASEAN Championship, starting against Laos.

== Style of play ==
In 2023, Washington Huskies head coach Jamie Clark stated "Gavin has more international experience than any player we have ever recruited. He’s got full international caps with the Philippines national team and has played all over the world in incredible settings. He’s a very talented midfielder with the ability to pull strings, but also works box-to-box. Gavin will enrol early and we’re excited to start working with him."

== Media ==
Muens appeared in Football Manager 2024, a football management simulation video game developed by Sports Interactive and published by Sega; he appears in each updated version up to and including Football Manager 2026 (officially abbreviated as FM26).

== Career statistics ==
As of match played 18 October 2025

Appearances and goals by club, season and competition
| Club | Season | League | | | National cup | | Continental | | Total | |
| Club | Season | Division | Apps | Goals | Apps | Goals | Apps | Goals | Apps | Goals |
|---|---|---|---|---|---|---|---|---|---|---|
| Azkals Development Club | 2023 | Philippines Football League | 4 | 1 | — | | — | | 4 | 1 |
| FC Schweinfurt 05 | 2023–24 | Regionalliga Bayern | 1 | 0 | — | | — | | 1 | 0 |
| Kaya–Iloilo | 2024–25 | Philippines Football League | 9 | 0 | — | | — | | 9 | 0 |
| Kaya–Iloilo | 2025–26 | Philippines Football League | 3 | 0 | — | | 4 (Note: Appearances in AFC Champions League Two) | 0 | 7 | 0 |
| Kaya–Iloilo | Total | | 12 | 0 | — | | 4 | 0 | 16 | 0 |
| One Taguig (loan) | 2024–25 | Philippines Football League | 3 | 0 | — | | — | | 3 | 0 |
| Career total | | | 20 | 1 | 0 | 0 | 4 | 0 | 24 | 1 |

=== International ===
As of match played 8 August 2026

Appearances and goals by national team and year
| National team | Year | Apps | Goals |
|---|---|---|---|
| Philippines | 2023 | 1 | 0 |
| Philippines | 2024 | 0 | 0 |
| Philippines | 2025 | 0 | 0 |
| Philippines | 2026 | 3 | 0 |
| Total | | 4 | 0 |

== Honours ==
Kaya–Iloilo

- Philippines Football League: 2024–25
