= G. Pavithran =

Malaysian footballer (born 2005)

Pavithran Gunalan
Personal information
- Full name: Pavithran Gunalan
- Date of birth: 10 January 2005 (age 21)
- Place of birth: Taiping, Perak, Malaysia
- Height: 1.80 m (5 ft 11 in)
- Position: Winger

Team information
- Current team: Terengganu
- Number: 18

Youth career
- Johor Darul Ta'zim IV
- Johor Darul Ta'zim III

Senior career*
| Years | Team | Apps | (Gls) |
| 2024–2026 | Johor Darul Ta'zim II | 17 | (1) |
| 2026– | Terengganu | 4 | (0) |

International career^{‡}
| 2024–2025 | Malaysia U19 | 5 | (4) |
| 2024– | Malaysia | 12 | (1) |
Medal record
Men's football
Representing Malaysia
FIFA ASEAN Cup
| Third place | 2026 Indonesia | Team |
- * Club domestic league appearances and goals as of 31 October 2026 ‡ National team caps and goals as of 17 November 2026

Pavithran a/l Gunalan (born 10 January 2005) is a Malaysian professional footballer who currently plays as a winger for Malaysia Super League club Terengganu and the Malaysia national team.

== Club career ==
=== Johor Darul Ta'zim II ===
Pavithran is a player who started out from the Johor Darul Ta'zim academy. In November 2024, Pavithran successfully led Johor Darul Ta'zim II to emerge as 2024–25 Piala Presiden champion.

=== Terengganu ===
On 28 August 2026, Pavithran joined Malaysia Super League side Terengganu on the back of his outstanding form in the ASEAN Championships.

== International career ==
=== Youth ===
In July 2024, Pavithran was selected for the 2024 ASEAN U-19 Boys Championship. He scored 4 goals in the tournament. In the opening match against Brunei U19, Pavithran scored two goals. The first goal came in the 2nd minute and the second goal in the 43rd minute.

He also managed to score two goals against Singapore U19 in the 45th minute and Thailand U19 in the 48th minute. He managed to bring the Malaysia U19 team to the next round but lost in the semi-finals and finished fourth after losing the third- and fourth-place matches.

=== Senior ===
In December 2024, Pavithran was named in the Malaysia national team for the 2024 ASEAN Championship campaign. He made his debut in Group B against Cambodia and Thailand. He was brought on in the second half in the 90th minute, replacing Stuart Wilkin, and in the 85th minute, replacing Adib Ra'op. However, Malaysia failed to advance to the next stage after finishing third in the group.

In July 2026, Pavithran was selected for the Malaysian squad for the 2026 ASEAN Championship. On 28 July, on his fifth appearance and second-ever start for the Malaysia national team, Pavithran registered two assists in a 4–0 win against Laos, earning the Man of the Match award for his performance.

Pavithran scored his first international goal on 8 August 2026 in the match against the Philippines at the Kuala Lumpur Stadium, again earning the Man of the Match award.

== Career statistics ==
=== International ===
As of match played 14 November 2026

Appearances and goals by national team and year
| National team | Year | Apps | Goals |
|---|---|---|---|
| Malaysia | 2024 | 2 | 0 |
| Malaysia | 2026 | 9 | 1 |
| Total | | 11 | 1 |

=== International goals ===
Scores and results list Thailand's goal tally first.

List of international goals scored by Pavithran Gunalan
| No. | Date | Venue | Opponent | Score | Result | Competition |
|---|---|---|---|---|---|---|
| 1. | 8 August 2026 | Kuala Lumpur Stadium, Kuala Lumpur, Malaysia | Philippines | 1–0 | 1–0 | 2026 ASEAN Championship |

== Honours ==
Johor Darul Ta'zim III

- Piala Presiden : 2024-2025

Malaysia

- FIFA ASEAN Cup third place : 2026
