= Zé Pedro (footballer, born 1978) =

Portuguese footballer

Personal information
- Full name: José Pedro Alves Salazar
- Date of birth: 18 October 1978 (age 48)
- Place of birth: Montijo, Portugal
- Height: 1.86 m (6 ft 1 in)
- Position: Attacking midfielder

Team information
- Current team: Timor-Leste (manager)

Youth career
- 1988–1991: Pelezinhos
- 1991–1994: Benfica
- 1994–1996: Montijo

Senior career*
| Years | Team | Apps | (Gls) |
| 1996–1997 | Montijo | 24 | (2) |
| 1997–2002 | Barreirense | 148 | (23) |
| 2002–2003 | Boavista | 2 | (0) |
| 2003 | → Ovarense (loan) | 16 | (2) |
| 2003–2004 | Vitória Setúbal | 30 | (8) |
| 2004–2010 | Belenenses | 162 | (29) |
| 2010–2013 | Vitória Setúbal | 46 | (3) |
| 2013–2014 | Alcochetense | 27 | (5) |
| Total | | 455 | (72) |

Managerial career
- 2014–2016: Alcochetense
- 2018: Belenenses (assistant)
- 2018–2019: B-SAD (assistant)
- 2019–2020: Sporting CP (assistant)
- 2021: Famalicão (assistant)
- 2022: AEL Limassol (assistant)
- 2023: B-SAD
- 2023–2024: Vitória Setúbal
- 2024: Alverca
- 2025–: Timor-Leste
- * Club domestic league appearances and goals

José Pedro Alves Salazar (born 18 October 1978), known as Zé Pedro, is a Portuguese former professional footballer who played as an attacking midfielder. He is currently manager of the Timor-Leste national team.

He amassed Primeira Liga totals of 210 matches and 32 goals over ten seasons, mainly with Belenenses and Vitória de Setúbal. He also represented in the competition Boavista, in an 18-year career.

== Playing career ==
Born in Montijo, Setúbal District, Zé Pedro started playing professional football for his hometown club C.D. Montijo in 1996, then moved to F.C. Barreirense where he would remain the following five seasons, all spent in the third division. He split duties in 2002–03 between Boavista F.C. and A.D. Ovarense.

Zé Pedro was influential in Vitória FC's 2003–04 campaign, as the Setúbal-based team earned a Primeira Liga return. He subsequently joined C.F. Os Belenenses, where he was immediately cast into the starting XI.

In 2006–07, Zé Pedro scored eight league goals for a Belenenses final fifth-place in the league (with qualification for the UEFA Cup), while they were also runners-up in the Taça de Portugal. He repeated the individual feat the following season, and remained first choice until the 2009–10 campaign, when he dealt with many injuries and the Lisbon side were also relegated as second-bottom.

In July 2010, aged 31, Zé Pedro returned to Vitória Setúbal after a six-year absence. He left at the end of the 2012–13 season, with the club always in the top flight; previously, in January 2013, Belenenses settled a €160,000 debt they had with him.

== Managerial career ==
Zé Pedro started working as a manager immediately after retiring, with his last club GD Alcochetense in the Setúbal regional leagues. Subsequently, he was part of his former Belenenses teammate Silas' coaching staff at that club (and its spin-off B-SAD), Sporting CP, F.C. Famalicão and AEL Limassol.

On 22 March 2023, Zé Pedro was appointed as B-SAD manager, replacing Paulo Mendes. His first game on 2 April was a 3–1 home loss to S.C.U. Torreense, as the season ended with relegation to Liga 3 after playoff defeat to Länk FC Vilaverdense.

Zé Pedro returned to Vitória Setúbal on 10 July 2023, with the team now in the Campeonato de Portugal. He went back to the second tier in June 2024 with newly promoted F.C. Alverca, but was dismissed only three months later due to poor results.

On 27 August 2025, Zé Pedro became head coach of the Timor-Leste national side.

== Managerial statistics ==
As of match played 30 September 2026

Managerial record by team and tenure
| Team | Nat. | From | To | Record | | | | | Ref. |
| Team | Nat. | From | To | G | W | D | L | Win % | Ref. |
|---|---|---|---|---|---|---|---|---|---|
| B-SAD | (Portugal) | 22 March 2023 | 30 June 2023 | 11 | 3 | 4 | 4 | 27.27 | |
| Vitória Setúbal | (Portugal) | 1 July 2023 | 30 June 2024 | 36 | 21 | 7 | 8 | 58.33 | |
| Alverca | (Portugal) | 1 July 2024 | 2 September 2024 | 4 | 0 | 3 | 1 | 0.00 | |
| Timor-Leste | (Timor-Leste) | 29 August 2025 | Present | 12 | 2 | 1 | 9 | 16.67 | |
| Career Total | | | | 63 | 26 | 15 | 22 | 41.27 | |
