= Daryl Sham =

Malaysian footballer (born 2002)

Personal information
- Full name: Daryl Sham a/l K.K George
- Date of birth: 30 November 2002 (age 23)
- Place of birth: Malaysia
- Height: 1.71 m (5 ft 7 in)
- Position: Midfielder

Team information
- Current team: Johor Darul Ta'zim
- Number: 81

Youth career
- 2019–2020: Johor Darul Ta'zim

Senior career*
| Years | Team | Apps | (Gls) |
| 2021– | Johor Darul Ta'zim II | | |
| 2022– | Johor Darul Ta'zim | 2 | (0) |

International career^{‡}
| 2022–2024 | Malaysia U23 | 8 | (0) |
| 2024– | Malaysia | 3 | (0) |
- * Club domestic league appearances and goals as of 9:00, 15 June 2024 (UTC) ‡ National team caps and goals as of 28 July 2026

Daryl Sham (born 30 November 2002), also referred to as a/l K.K. George, is a Malaysian professional footballer who plays as a midfielder for Malaysia Super League club Johor Darul Ta'zim and the Malaysia national team.

== Early life ==
Daryl Sham was born on 30 November 2002 in Malaysia. He is of Filipino descent.

He is referred to as "Darryl Sham a/l K.K George" on his Johor Southern Tigers profile in 2024.

== Club career ==
In the 2022 Malaysia Premier League season, he scored 9 goals to finish as the second highest scorer of the league, and also contributed in Johor Darul Ta'zim II league title. At the same year, he made his debut with Johor Darul Ta'zim first team, in a Malaysian Cup game against BRM FC and also scored his first goal for the team in the 10–0 win.

== International career ==
=== Youth ===
In April 2024, Daryl was included in the Malaysia U23's squad for the 2024 AFC U-23 Asian Cup.

=== Senior ===
In November 2024, Daryl received his first call up to the Malaysia national team, being named in the 26-man squad for the 2024 ASEAN Championship. He made his debut on 14 December in the match against Thailand.

On 11 July 2026, Daryl was called up by Malaysia interim manager Tan Cheng Hoe for the 25-man final squad list for the 2026 ASEAN Championship.

== Career statistics ==
=== International ===
As of match played 14 December 2024

Appearances and goals by national team and year
| National team | Year | Apps | Goals |
|---|---|---|---|
| Malaysia | 2024 | 1 | 0 |
| Total | | 1 | 0 |

== Honours ==
Johor Darul Ta'zim II

- Malaysia Premier League: 2022
- MFL Cup: 2024–25

Johor Darul Ta'zim

- Malaysia Super League: 2022, 2023
- Malaysia Cup: 2022, 2023
- Malaysia FA Cup: 2022, 2024
