= Adrian Ugelvik =

Filipino footballer (born 2001)

Personal information
- Full name: Adrian Cortes Ugelvik
- Date of birth: September 21, 2001 (age 25)
- Place of birth: Molde, Norway
- Height: 1.87 m (6 ft 2 in)
- Position: Centre back

Team information
- Current team: Brattvåg
- Number: 5

Youth career
- Molde

Senior career*
Years	Team	Apps	(Gls)
2021	Molde	0	(0)
2021–2022	Brattvåg	36	(2)
2023–2024	Levanger	24	(0)
2025	Brattvåg	4	(0)
2025–2026	PT Prachuap	17	(1)
2026—	Brattvåg	4	(0)

International career^{‡}
2024–	Philippines	4	(0)
- * Club domestic league appearances and goals as of 15 November 2026 ‡ National team caps and goals as of 16:20, December 21, 2024 (UTC)

Adrian Cortes Ugelvik (born September 21, 2001) is a professional footballer who plays as a centre back for Norwegian Second Division club Brattvåg. Born in Norway, he plays for the Philippines national team.

== Career ==
Born in Norway, Ugelvik began his career with the youth team of Molde.

=== Molde ===
In 2017, Ugelvik was promoted to the second team of Molde.

Ugelvik was handed a professional contract and was promoted to the senior team of Molde.

He made his senior debut for Molde in a 1–4 away win against Spjelkavik in the Norwegian Football Cup.

=== Brattvåg ===
Ugelvik joined 2. divisjon club Brattvåg on a free transfer. He made his debut for the club in a 2–3 home defeat against Aalesunds in the Norwegian Football Cup.

Ugelvik scored his first goal for Brattvåg in a 2–3 away win against Senja in the 2. divisjon. He scored his second goal in a 2–0 home win against Alta.

=== Levanger ===
In December 2022, after spending two seasons with Brattvåg, it was announced that Ugelvik have signed for Levanger on a free transfer.

=== Brattvåg ===
On 2 December 2024, it was announced that Ugelvik returned to play for Brattvåg.

== International career ==
Ugelvik was born in Norway to a Norwegian father and a Filipino mother making him eligible to play for either Norway or Philippines at international level.

=== Philippines ===
Ugelvik received a call up for the Philippines in the 2020 AFF Championship but eventually did not take part in the tournament due to injury.

In May 2024, Ugelvik was included in the Philippines 28-man squad for the 2026 FIFA World Cup qualifying matches against Vietnam and Indonesia.

He made his national team debut against Vietnam on June 6, 2024, at the Mỹ Đình National Stadium. He played the full game as Vietnam won 3–2.
