= Vladica Grujic =

Serbian footballer and manager

Personal information
- Full name: Vladica Grujic
- Date of birth: 22 October 1962 (age 64)
- Place of birth: SR Serbia, SFR Yugoslavia
- Position: Forward

Team information
- Current team: Laos (head coach)

Youth career
- Radnički Niš

Senior career*
Years	Team	Apps	(Gls)
1984–1985	Radnički Niš		
1985–1987	Majdanpek		
1987–1989	OFK Beograd		
1989–1990	LUV Graz		
1992–1993	LUV Graz	34	(13)
1993	VSE St. Pölten	11	(1)
1994–1995	Oberwart	33	(10)
1995–1996	Spittal/Drau	12	(3)
1996–1997	SAK Klagenfurt		
1997–1998	Gratkorn		
1998–2000	Flavia Solva		
2001–2005	Gleinstätten		
2005	St. Andrä/Höch	4	(2)

Managerial career
- 2005–2006: Gleinstätten
- 2006–2007: ASK Köflach
- 2008–2009: Allerheiligen
- 2025: Großklein
- 2026–: Laos U23
- 2026–: Laos
- * Club domestic league appearances and goals

Vladica Grujic (born 22 October 1962) is a Serbian professional football manager and former player who is currently the head coach of the Laos national team.

== Managerial career ==
After his retirement, Grujic started managing lower league Austrian clubs before becoming the assistant coach of Hans-Peter Schaller for the Laos national team in 2011.

Grujic has served as an assistant coach of Ranko Popović for different clubs in different countries. In 2013, he was appointed as the assistant coach of FC Tokyo. Grujic left the club with Popović in 2014. He also worked as an assistant coach of Cerezo Osaka in 2014. In November 2014, Grujic was appointed as the assistant coach of Real Zaragoza under Popović. He stayed with the Spanish club until the dismissal of Popović in December 2015. In 2016, Grujic again reunited with Popović at Buriram United. In 2017, he was appointed as the assistant coach of Pune City in the Indian Super League. In 2018, Grujic returned to Austria again with Popović at SKN St. Pölten, his former club.

On 20 February 2026, Grujic was announced as the new head coach of Laos, returning to the country after 15 years.

== Managerial statistics ==
As of match played 27 September 2026

Managerial record by team and tenure
Team	Nat.	From	To	Record					Ref.
Team	Nat.	From	To	G	W	D	L	Win %	Ref.
Gleinstätten	(Austria)	1 July 2004	30 June 2006	34	17	5	12	50.00	
ASK Köflach	(Austria)	10 August 2006	30 June 2007	29	8	5	16	27.59	
Allerheiligen	(Austria)	13 December 2007	11 May 2009	38	16	9	13	42.11	
Laos	(Laos)	20 February 2026	Present	7	2	0	5	28.57	
Career Total				108	43	19	46	39.81	
