= Scott Woods (footballer) =

Filipino footballer (born 2000)

Personal information
- Full name: Scott Phillip Galang Woods
- Date of birth: 7 May 2000 (age 26)
- Place of birth: Oslo, Norway
- Height: 1.77 m (5 ft 10 in)
- Positions: Defensive midfielder; left-back

Team information
- Current team: Boeung Ket
- Number: 4

Youth career
- –2016: Flint
- 2016–2017: Tønsberg

College career
Years	Team	Apps	(Gls)
2019–2020	Northeastern Junior College	21	(4)
2021–2022	NSU RiverHawks	37	(2)

Senior career*
Years	Team	Apps	(Gls)
2017–2019	Tønsberg	36	(1)
2022	Azkals Development Club	6	(0)
2022–2023	Flint	4	(0)
2024	Eik Tønsberg	33	(2)
2024–2025	Muangthong United	1	(0)
2025	Boeung Ket	14	(0)
2025–2026	Kuching City	28	(1)
2026—	Boeung Ket	4	(0)

International career^{‡}
2022–2026	Philippines U23	8	(0)
2024–	Philippines	12	(0)
- * Club domestic league appearances and goals as of 13:41, 9 November 2026 (UTC) ‡ National team caps and goals as of 16:03, 22 September 2026 (UTC)

Scott Phillip Galang Woods (born 7 May 2000) is a professional footballer who plays as a defensive midfielder or a left-back for Cambodian Premier League club Boeung Ket. Born in Norway, he represents the Philippines national team.

== Early life ==
He attended Northeastern Junior College in Colorado as well as Northeastern State University, where he played for the Northeastern State RiverHawks soccer team.

== Club career ==
He was playing for Norwegian side FK Eik Tønsberg in 2019.

In early 2022, Woods signed with the Azkals Development Team of the Philippines Football League. He played in the 2022 Copa Paulino Alcantara, scoring in a 1–1 draw with Stallion Laguna.

He signed a new contract with the club in January 2024. He played against IL Hødd in the opening match of the 2024 season in which the club played back in Norwegian Second Division since promotion.

== International career ==
He was in the Philippines U23 team for the 2021 SEA Games in Hanoi, and the 2022 AFF U-23 Championship in Phnom Penh, Cambodia, in 2022.

He was called up to the senior Philippines squad for their June 2024 World Cup qualifying matches against Vietnam and Indonesia. He made his senior international debut on 6 June 2024 against Vietnam.

== Personal life ==
Born in Norway, Woods is of Filipino and Scottish descent. He is the younger brother of former Norway international Lisa-Marie Woods.

== Career statistics ==
=== Club ===
As of 24 April 2025

Appearances and goals by club, season and competition
Club	Season	League			Nation Cup		League Cup		Continental		Total	
Club	Season	Division	Apps	Goals	Apps	Goals	Apps	Goals	Apps	Goals	Apps	Goals
FK Eik Tønsberg	2023	Norwegian Third Division	25	2	2	0	0	0	0	0	27	2
FK Eik Tønsberg	2024	Norwegian Second Division	9	0	2	0	0	0	0	0	9	2
FK Eik Tønsberg	Total		34	2	2	0	0	0	0	0	36	2
Muangthong United	2024–25	Thai League 1	1	0	0	0	1	0	1	0	3	0
Boeung Ket Angkor	2024–25	Cambodian Premier League	10	0	0	0	0	0	0	0	10	0
Career total			0	0	0	0	0	0	0	0	0	0

=== Notes ===
Woods.
