= 2026 ASEAN Championship final =

ASEAN Championsip final

Thailand	Vietnam
(Thailand)	(Vietnam)
2	4
- on aggregate

First leg
Thailand	Vietnam
0	2
- Date: 22 August 2026
- Venue: Rajamangala Stadium, Bangkok
- Hyundai Player of the Match: Lê Giang Patrik (Vietnam)
- Referee: Sami Al-Ismail (Saudi Arabia)
- Attendance: 26,415
- Weather: Rain; 27 °C (81 °F); 84% humidity

Second leg
Vietnam	Thailand
2	2
- Date: 26 August 2026
- Venue: Mỹ Đình National Stadium, Hanoi
- Hyundai Player of the Match: Đỗ Hoàng Hên (Vietnam)
- Referee: Ahmed Eisa Darwish (United Arab Emirates)
- Weather: Cloudy; 29 °C (84 °F); 89% humidity

The 2026 ASEAN Championship final was the final match of the 2026 ASEAN Championship, the 16th edition of the ASEAN Football Federation competition for men's national football teams. The match was contested over two legs on 22 and 26 August 2026, at venues pre-determined by Thailand and defending champions Vietnam. Vietnam secured their fourth championship overall and first back-to-back after winning 4–2 on aggregate.

== Background ==
This was the twelfth ASEAN Championship final and fourth consecutive finals for Thailand, having won the 1996, 2000, 2002, 2014, 2016, 2020, 2022 finals, and lost in 2007, 2008, 2012 and 2024 finals. For Vietnam, it was the sixth ASEAN Championship final and third consecutive finals having won in 2008, 2018 and 2024 finals, but lost in two 1998 and 2022 finals.

Both were the strongest-ranked AFF teams in the FIFA World Rankings; Thailand was ranked first in Southeast Asia at 94th while Vietnam ranked second, five places behind. This marked the first time that the finalists meet in three successive AFF Championship finals. Thailand had the second-highest win percentage in the ASEAN Championship finals with 64% while Vietnam had 60%. Thailand leads the all-time championship table with seven titles to their name while Vietnam, on the other hand, had only won three in 2008, 2018 and 2024. They have met in the final thrice prior: in 2008 when Vietnam won 3–2 on aggregate (won 2–1 in the first leg; and drew 1–1 in the second), 2022 when Thailand won by the same scoreline (2–2 draw in the first leg; and won 1–0 in the second), and most recently 2024 when Vietnam won 5–3 on aggregate (winning both legs 2–1 and 3–2, respectively). In all competitions since Vietnam's reintegration, Thailand won 18 meetings, Vietnam won only 5, and 8 matches ended in draws.

This final between the two countries is highly anticipated given their success, having won each AFF tournament since 2014.

== Venues ==
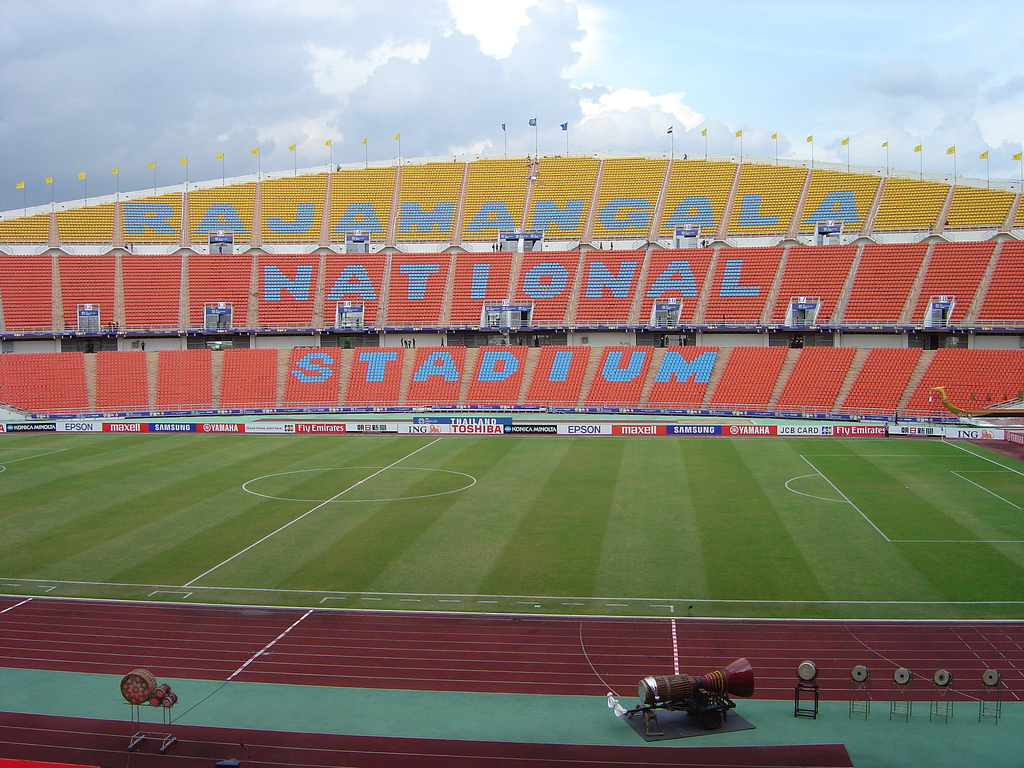
Rajamangala Stadium

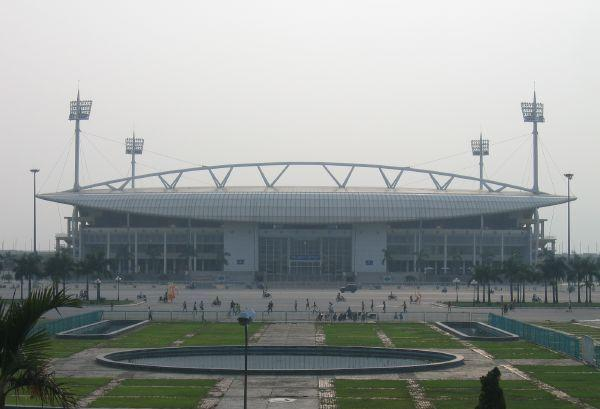
Mỹ Đình National Stadium

The two stadiums chosen to host the 2026 ASEAN Championship finals were the Rajamangala Stadium in Bangkok, Thailand and the Mỹ Đình National Stadium in Hanoi, Vietnam. The first leg will be hosted at Rajamangala Stadium on 22 August, while the second leg will be played at Mỹ Đình Stadium on 26 August.

Rajamangala Stadium opened on 6 December 1998 and was built for the 1998 Asian Games, which was held in Thailand. With a capacity of 51,560 spectators, it is the home ground of Thailand national football team. It has hosted many international and regional sporting events, such as the FIFA World Cup qualification, AFC Asian Cup, ASEAN Championship and Southeast Asian Games.

Mỹ Đình National Stadium was officially inaugurated on 2 September 2003, which coincided with the nation's Independence Day. It was constructed to serve the 2003 Southeast Asian Games hosted in Vietnam. With a capacity of 40,192, the stadium serves as a key national sports venue and is the main home stadium of the Vietnam national football team. Similarly, Mỹ Đình Stadium has also hosted many important international matches, multi-sport events as well as major cultural activities.

== Route to the final ==
Note: In all results below, the score of the finalist is given first (H: home; A: away).

Thailand				Round	Vietnam			
Opponent	Score			Group stage	Opponent	Score		
Laos	5–0			Match 1	Timor-Leste	7–0		
Malaysia	2–0			Match 2	Singapore	0–0		
Philippines	1–0			Match 3	Indonesia	3–0		
Myanmar	2–0			Match 4	Cambodia	3–1		
Group B winners: Pos / Team / Pld / Pts; 1 / Thailand / 4 / 12; 2 / Malaysia / 4 / 9; 3 / Myanmar / 4 / 6; 4 / Philippines / 4 / 3; 5 / Laos / 4 / 0; Source: ASEAN United				Final standings	Group A winners: Pos / Team / Pld / Pts; 1 / Vietnam / 4 / 10; 2 / Singapore / 4 / 8; 3 / Indonesia / 4 / 7; 4 / Cambodia / 4 / 3; 5 / Timor-Leste / 4 / 0; Source: ASEAN United			
Opponent	Agg.	1st leg	2nd leg	Knockout stage	Opponent	Agg.	1st leg	2nd leg
Singapore	4–3	3–1 (A)	1–2 (H)	Semi-finals	Malaysia	4–0	2–0 (A)	2–0 (H)

== Matches ==
=== First leg ===
22 August 2026
20:00 UTC+7

Thailand	0–2	Vietnam
	Report	Nguyễn Hai Long 62'; Nguyễn Quang Hải 69'

Rajamangala Stadium, Bangkok
Attendance: 26,415
Referee: Sami Al-Ismail (Saudi Arabia)

Thailand	Vietnam

GK	1	Kampol Pathomakkakul
RB	12	Waris Choolthong
CB	2	Nattapong Sayriya
CB	4	Manuel Bihr
LB	13	Oussama Thiangkham		(substituted off) 82'
CM	6	Sarach Yooyen (c)
CM	7	Kakana Khamyok	(yellow card) 78'	(substituted off) 90+4'
CM	21	Chaiyaphon Otton
RF	9	Yotsakorn Burapha		(substituted off) 74'
CF	14	Teerasak Poeiphimai		(substituted off) 82'
LF	5	Seksan Ratree		(substituted off) 74'
Substitutions:
FW	25	Patrik Gustavsson		(substituted on) 74'
MF	17	Picha Autra		(substituted on) 74'
FW	18	Jehhanafee Mamah		(substituted on) 82'
DF	24	Wanchai Jarunongkran		(substituted on) 82'
MF	10	Worachit Kanitsribumphen		(substituted on) 90+4'
Manager:
(England) Anthony Hudson

GK	1	Lê Giang Patrik
CB	7	Phạm Xuân Mạnh
CB	16	Nguyễn Thành Chung	(yellow card) 57'
CB	5	Đoàn Văn Hậu
RWB	15	Trương Tiến Anh
LWB	3	Nguyễn Văn Vĩ
RM	10	Đỗ Hoàng Hên		(substituted off) 76'
CM	8	Lê Phạm Thành Long		(substituted off) 58'
CM	14	Nguyễn Hoàng Đức (c)
LM	9	Nguyễn Đình Bắc		(substituted off) 90+2'
CF	12	Nguyễn Xuân Son		(substituted off) 58'
Substitutions:
MF	19	Nguyễn Quang Hải		(substituted on) 58'
MF	18	Nguyễn Hai Long		(substituted on) 58'
MF	13	Nguyễn Tài Lộc		(substituted on) 76'
FW	22	Nguyễn Trần Việt Cường		(substituted on) 90+2'
Manager:
(South Korea) Kim Sang-sik

Hyundai Player of the Match:
Lê Giang Patrik (Vietnam)

Assistant referees:
Hesham Al-Refaei (Saudi Arabia)
Saad Al-Subaiee (Saudi Arabia)
Fourth official:
Thoriq Alkatiri (Indonesia)
Video assistant referee:
Muhammad Taqi (Singapore)
Assistant video assistant referee:
Jin Jingyuan (China)

Match rules

- 90 minutes
- Maximum of twelve named substitutes
- Maximum of five substitutions, with a sixth allowed in extra time
- Maximum of three substitution opportunities, with a fourth allowed in extra time

=== Second leg ===
==== Pre-match ====
===== Officiating =====
On 23 August 2026, Ahmed Eisa Darwish of the United Arab Emirates was named as the referee for the second leg of the final, with fellow Emiratis Saeed Rashed Almarzooqi and Yaser Sabeil Almurshidi as assistant referees. Muhammad Taqi of Singapore were named as the fourth official. He had previously officiated the 2025–26 AFC Champions League Two Group H first matchday, 2024–25 AFC Challenge League semi-finals east and 2023–24 AFC Champions League Group F fourth matchday. He was also one of the referees at the 2024 AFC U-23 Asian Cup and 2023 AFC U-17 Asian Cup. He became the first Emirati to referee a ASEAN Championship final.

===== Dignitaries in attendance =====
FIFA president Gianni Infantino and Secretary General Mattias Grafström along with AFF president Khiev Sameth, VFF president Trần Quốc Tuấn and FAT president Nualphan Lamsam attended the second leg of the ASEAN Championship final. Vietnam's deputy prime minister Lê Tiến Châu and former prime minister Phạm Minh Chính was also in attendance.

==== Details ====
26 August 2026
20:00 UTC+7

Vietnam	2–2	Thailand
Chatchai 52' (o.g.); Wanchai 90+3' (o.g.)	Report	Yotsakorn 12'; Wanchai 85'

Mỹ Đình National Stadium, Hanoi
Attendance: 38,646
Referee: Ahmed Eisa Darwish (United Arab Emirates)

Vietnam	Thailand

GK	1	Lê Giang Patrik
CB	7	Phạm Xuân Mạnh
CB	16	Nguyễn Thành Chung
CB	5	Đoàn Văn Hậu
RM	15	Trương Tiến Anh
CM	8	Lê Phạm Thành Long	(substituted off) 68'
CM	14	Nguyễn Hoàng Đức (c)	(substituted off) 79'
LM	3	Nguyễn Văn Vĩ	(substituted off) 9'
RF	10	Đỗ Hoàng Hên	(substituted off) 68'
CF	12	Nguyễn Xuân Son
LF	9	Nguyễn Đình Bắc
Substitutions:
DF	24	Phan Tuấn Tài	(substituted on) 9'
MF	19	Nguyễn Quang Hải	(substituted on) 68'
MF	18	Nguyễn Hai Long	(substituted on) 68'
MF	13	Nguyễn Tài Lộc	(substituted on) 79'
Manager:
(South Korea) Kim Sang-sik

GK	20	Chatchai Budprom
RB	12	Waris Choolthong	(yellow card) 86'
CB	2	Nattapong Sayriya
CB	4	Manuel Bihr
LB	13	Oussama Thiangkham		(substituted off) 84'
DM	6	Sarach Yooyen (c)		(substituted off) 84'
RM	9	Yotsakorn Burapha		(substituted off) 69'
CM	5	Seksan Ratree		(substituted off) 69'
CM	7	Kakana Khamyok
LM	21	Chaiyaphon Otton
CF	14	Teerasak Poeiphimai		(substituted off) 88'
Substitutions:
FW	18	Jehhanafee Mamah		(substituted on) 69'
MF	19	Pokklaw Anan		(substituted on) 69'
MF	10	Worachit Kanitsribumphen		(substituted on) 84'
DF	24	Wanchai Jarunongkran		(substituted on) 84'
FW	25	Patrik Gustavsson		(substituted on) 88'
Manager:
(England) Anthony Hudson

Hyundai Player of the Match:
Đỗ Hoàng Hên (Vietnam)

Assistant referees:
Saeed Rashed Almarzooqi (United Arab Emirates)
Yaser Sabeil Almurshidi (United Arab Emirates)
Fourth official:
Muhammad Taqi (Singapore)
Video assistant referee:
Jin Jingyuan (China)
Assistant video assistant referee:
Thoriq Alkatiri (Indonesia)

Match rules

- 90 minutes
- 30 minutes of extra time if necessary
- Penalty shoot-out if scores still level
- Maximum of twelve named substitutes
- Maximum of five substitutions, with a sixth allowed in extra time
- Maximum of three substitution opportunities, with a fourth allowed in extra time

Vietnam won 4–2 on aggregate.

== Entertainment ==
A closing ceremony for the ASEAN Championship began at 19:40 Indochina Time (UTC+7), twenty minutes before the scheduled kick-off of the second leg of the final match. Tùng Dương performed both songs "Đường đến ngày vinh quang" (Road to Glory) by glam metal band Bức Tường and newly composed song, "Khát vọng vinh quang" (Hunger for Glory) by Tùng Dương and Nguyễn Văn Chung. Lê Công Vinh, who scored the goal that won Vietnam the 2008 AFF Championship, unveiled the ASEAN Championship trophy.
