= 2026 ASEAN Championship knockout stage =

The knockout stage of the 2026 ASEAN Championship was the second and final stage of the competition, following the group stage. Played from 15 to 26 August 2026, the knockout stage ended with the final. The top two teams from each of the two groups advanced to the knockout stage to compete in a single-elimination tournament. There were six matches in the knockout stage.

== Format ==
The knockout stage of the 2026 ASEAN Championship was contested between the four teams that qualified from the group stage. All matchup ties were played over two legs. Matches in the knockout stage were played to a finish. If the score on aggregate was still level at the end of 90 minutes of playing time (second leg), 30 minutes of extra time were played. If the score on aggregate was still tied, the tie was decided by a penalty shoot-out. All times listed are local.

== Qualified teams ==
The top two teams from each of the two groups qualified for the knockout stage.

Group	Winners	Runners-up
A	Vietnam	Singapore
B	Thailand	Malaysia

== Bracket ==
The tournament bracket is shown below, with bold denoting the winners of each round.

Semi-finals
A2	Singapore	1	2	**3**
B1	**Thailand**	3	1	**4**
B2	Malaysia	0	0	**0**
A1	**Vietnam**	2	2	**4**

Final
B1	Thailand	0	2	**2**
A1	**Vietnam**	2	2	**4**

== Semi-finals ==
Team 1	Agg.	Team 2	1st leg	2nd leg
Singapore	3–4	Thailand	1–3	2–1
Malaysia	0–4	Vietnam	0–2	0–2

=== First leg ===
==== Singapore vs Thailand ====
15 August 2026
21:00 UTC+8

Singapore	1–3	Thailand
Ilhan 84'	Report	Teerasak 13', 26'; Seksan 51'

Jalan Besar Stadium, Kallang
Attendance: 5,358
Referee: Mahmood Al-Majarafi (Oman)

**Singapore**	**Thailand**

GK	1	Izwan Mahbud
RB	15	Lionel Tan		(substituted off) 57'
CB	14	Hariss Harun (c)
CB	17	Irfan Fandi	(yellow card) 56'	(substituted off) 69'
LB	26	Nur Adam Abdullah
CM	8	Shah Shahiran
CM	18	Jacob Mahler
RW	11	Glenn Kweh		(substituted off) 46'
AM	13	Harhys Stewart
LW	6	Kyoga Nakamura
CF	20	Shawal Anuar		(substituted off) 85'
**Substitutions**
FW	19	Ilhan Fandi		(substituted on) 46'
DF	3	Ryhan Stewart		(substituted on) 57'
DF	16	Hami Syahin		(substituted on) 69'
MF	10	Farhan Zulkifli		(substituted on) 85'
**Manager**
Gavin Lee

GK	1	Kampol Pathomakkakul
RB	12	Waris Choolthong
CB	4	Manuel Bihr
CB	2	Nattapong Sayriya
LB	13	Oussama Thiangkham		(substituted off) 64'
RM	9	Yotsakorn Burapha	(yellow card) 33'	(substituted off) 79'
CM	6	Sarach Yooyen (c)	(yellow card) 88'
CM	21	Chaiyaphon Otton
LM	14	Teerasak Poeiphimai		(substituted off) 43'
CF	5	Seksan Ratree		(substituted off) 79'
CF	7	Kakana Khamyok		(substituted off) 64'
**Substitutions**
FW	25	Patrik Gustavsson		(substituted on) 43'
DF	24	Wanchai Jarunongkran		(substituted on) 64'
FW	17	Picha Autra		(substituted on) 64'
DF	3	Pansa Hemviboon		(substituted on) 79'
FW	8	Thossawat Limwannasathian		(substituted on) 79'
**Manager**
(England) Anthony Hudson

Hyundai Player of the Match:
Seksan Ratree (Thailand)

Assistant referees:
Nasser Salim Abdullah Ambusaidi (Oman)
Hamed Talib Saif Al Ghafri (Oman)
Fourth official:
Lê Vũ Linh (Vietnam)
Video assistant referee:
Choi Hyun-jai (South Korea)
Assistant video assistant referee:
Naufan Adya Fairuski (Indonesia)

==== Malaysia vs Vietnam ====
16 August 2026
21:00 UTC+8

Malaysia	0–2	Vietnam
	Report	Nguyễn Xuân Son 45+5'; Faris 86' (o.g.)

Kuala Lumpur Stadium, Kuala Lumpur
Attendance: 10,141
Referee: Rustam Lutfullin (Uzbekistan)

**Malaysia**	**Vietnam**

GK	1	Azri Ghani
RB	4	Alif Ahmad
CB	5	Rodney Celvin		(substituted off) 16'
CB	3	Ubaidullah Shamsul
LB	25	Faris Danish
CM	8	Sergio Agüero		(substituted off) 85'
CM	20	Syafiq Ahmad		(substituted off) 65'
RW	13	Mohamadou Sumareh		(substituted off) 65'
AM	22	Daryl Sham
LW	21	G. Pavithran
CF	17	Paulo Josué (c)
Substitutions:
DF	6	Aysar Hadi	(yellow card) 18'	(substituted on) 16'
FW	19	Haqimi Azim		(substituted on) 65'
MF	15	Ibrahim Manusi		(substituted on) 65'
MF	26	Ziad El Basheer		(substituted on) 85'
Manager:
Tan Cheng Hoe

GK	1	Lê Giang Patrik
CB	20	Bùi Hoàng Việt Anh
CB	16	Nguyễn Thành Chung
CB	7	Phạm Xuân Mạnh
RM	15	Trương Tiến Anh
CM	8	Lê Phạm Thành Long		(substituted off) 81'
CM	14	Nguyễn Hoàng Đức (c)		(substituted off) 90+4'
LM	3	Nguyễn Văn Vĩ		(substituted off) 90+4'
RF	13	Nguyễn Tài Lộc		(substituted off) 70'
CF	12	Nguyễn Xuân Son		(substituted off) 81'
LF	9	Nguyễn Đình Bắc	(yellow card) 32'
Substitutions:
MF	10	Đỗ Hoàng Hên		(substituted on) 70'
MF	19	Nguyễn Quang Hải		(substituted on) 81'
MF	18	Nguyễn Hai Long		(substituted on) 81'
DF	5	Đoàn Văn Hậu		(substituted on) 90+4'
DF	6	Nguyễn Nhật Minh		(substituted on) 90+4'
Manager:
(South Korea) Kim Sang-sik

Hyundai Player of the Match:
Nguyễn Xuân Son (Vietnam)

Assistant referees:
Sanzhar Shoyusupov (Uzbekistan)
Akmal G'iyosov (Uzbekistan)
Fourth official:
Sivakorn Pu-udom (Thailand)
Video assistant referee:
Choi Hyun-jai (South Korea)
Assistant video assistant referee:
Mongkolchai Pechsri (Thailand)

=== Second leg ===
==== Thailand vs Singapore ====
18 August 2026
20:00 UTC+7

Thailand	1–2	Singapore
Kakana 61' (pen.)	Report	H. Stewart 45'; Pansa 65' (o.g.)

Rajamangala Stadium, Bangkok
Attendance: 10,802
Referee: Kim Woo-sung (South Korea)

**Thailand**	**Singapore**

GK	1	Kampol Pathomakkakul
RB	15	Narubadin Weerawatnodom
CB	4	Manuel Bihr
CB	3	Pansa Hemviboon
LB	24	Wanchai Jarunongkran		(substituted off) 88'
RM	6	Sarach Yooyen (c)
CM	5	Seksan Ratree		(substituted off) 62'
CM	10	Worachit Kanitsribampen		(substituted off) 46'
CM	14	Teerasak Poeiphimai
LM	17	Picha Autra	(yellow card) 41'	(substituted off) 81'
CF	25	Patrik Gustavsson		(substituted off) 46'
Substitutions:
MF	21	Chaiyaphon Otton		(substituted on) 46'
FW	7	Kakana Khamyok		(substituted on) 46'
FW	9	Yotsakorn Burapha		(substituted on) 62'
MF	8	Thossawat Limwannasathian		(substituted on) 81'
DF	13	Oussama Thiangkham		(substituted on) 88'
Manager:
(England) Anthony Hudson

GK	1	Izwan Mahbud
RB	3	Ryhan Stewart		(substituted off) 72'
CB	14	Hariss Harun (c)	(yellow card) 54'	(substituted off) 72'
CB	18	Jacob Mahler
LB	26	Nur Adam Abdullah		(substituted off) 65'
CM	8	Shah Shahiran
CM	6	Kyoga Nakamura
RW	10	Farhan Zulkifli		(substituted off) 65'
AM	13	Harhys Stewart
LW	7	Song Ui-young	(yellow card) 50'
CF	19	Ilhan Fandi		(substituted off) 78'
Substitutions:
FW	20	Shawal Anuar		(substituted on) 65'
FW	11	Glenn Kweh		(substituted on) 65'
DF	15	Lionel Tan		(substituted on) 72'
DF	17	Irfan Fandi		(substituted on) 72'
MF	16	Hami Syahin		(substituted on) 78'
Manager:
Gavin Lee

Hyundai Player of the Match:
Ryhan Stewart (Singapore)

Assistant referees:
Park Sang-Jun (South Korea)
Cheon Jin-Hee (South Korea)
Fourth official:
Nguyễn Mạnh Hải (Vietnam)
Video assistant referee:
Sami Ahmed Al Jurays (Saudi Arabia)
Assistant video assistant referee:
Thoriq Alkatiri (Indonesia)

Thailand won 4–3 on aggregate

==== Vietnam vs Malaysia ====
19 August 2026
20:00 UTC+7

Vietnam	2–0	Malaysia
Nguyễn Xuân Son 62', 89'	Report

Mỹ Đình National Stadium, Hanoi
Attendance: 37,906
Referee: Yusuke Ohashi (Japan)

**Vietnam**	**Malaysia**

GK	1	Lê Giang Patrik
CB	7	Phạm Xuân Mạnh
CB	16	Nguyễn Thành Chung
CB	5	Đoàn Văn Hậu		(substituted off) 80'
RM	15	Trương Tiến Anh
CM	14	Nguyễn Hoàng Đức		(substituted off) 71'
CM	19	Nguyễn Quang Hải (c)
LM	24	Phan Tuấn Tài		(substituted off) 71'
RF	10	Đỗ Hoàng Hên		(substituted off) 59'
CF	9	Nguyễn Đình Bắc
LF	18	Nguyễn Hai Long		(substituted off) 59'
**Substitutions**
FW	13	Nguyễn Tài Lộc		(substituted on) 59'
FW	12	Nguyễn Xuân Son	(yellow card) 65'	(substituted on) 59'
MF	3	Nguyễn Văn Vĩ	(yellow card) 72'	(substituted on) 71'
MF	8	Lê Phạm Thành Long		(substituted on) 71'
DF	4	Đinh Quang Kiệt		(substituted on) 80'
**Manager**
(South Korea) Kim Sang-sik

GK	1	Azri Ghani
RB	4	Alif Ahmad
CB	6	Aysar Hadi
CB	3	Ubaidullah Shamsul
LB	25	Faris Danish
CM	26	Ziad El Basheer	(substituted off) 90+1'
CM	8	Sergio Agüero	(substituted off) 35'
RW	13	Mohamadou Sumareh	(substituted off) 79'
AM	22	Daryl Sham
LW	21	G. Pavithran
CF	17	Paulo Josué (c)	(substituted off) 79'
**Substitutions**
MF	20	Syafiq Ahmad	(substituted on) 35'
FW	9	Hadi Fayyadh	(substituted on) 79'
MF	19	Haqimi Azim	(substituted on) 79'
MF	14	Engku Nur Shakir	(substituted on) 90+1'
**Manager**
Tan Cheng Hoe

Hyundai Player of the Match:
Nguyễn Xuân Son (Vietnam)

Assistant referees:
Takeshi Asada (Japan)
Satoshi Michiyama (Japan)
Fourth official:
Naufan Adya Fairuski (Indonesia)
Video assistant referee:
Sami Ahmed Al Jurays (Saudi Arabia)
Assistant video assistant referee:
Thoriq Alkatiri (Indonesia)

Vietnam won 4–0 on aggregate

== Final ==
Team 1	Agg.	Team 2	1st leg	2nd leg
Thailand	2–4	Vietnam	0–2	2–2

=== First leg ===
22 August 2026
20:00 UTC+7

Thailand	0–2	Vietnam
	Report	Nguyễn Hai Long 62'; Nguyễn Quang Hải 69'

Rajamangala Stadium, Bangkok
Attendance: 26,415
Referee: Sami Al-Ismail (Saudi Arabia)

GK	1	Kampol Pathomakkakul
RB	12	Waris Choolthong
CB	2	Nattapong Sayriya
CB	4	Manuel Bihr
LB	13	Oussama Thiangkham		(substituted off) 82'
CM	6	Sarach Yooyen (c)
CM	7	Kakana Khamyok	(yellow card) 78'	(substituted off) 90+4'
CM	21	Chaiyaphon Otton
RF	9	Yotsakorn Burapha		(substituted off) 74'
CF	14	Teerasak Poeiphimai		(substituted off) 82'
LF	5	Seksan Ratree		(substituted off) 74'
Substitutions:
FW	25	Patrik Gustavsson		(substituted on) 74'
MF	17	Picha Autra		(substituted on) 74'
FW	18	Jehhanafee Mamah		(substituted on) 82'
DF	24	Wanchai Jarunongkran		(substituted on) 82'
MF	10	Worachit Kanitsribumphen		(substituted on) 90+4'
Manager:
(England) Anthony Hudson

GK	1	Lê Giang Patrik
CB	7	Phạm Xuân Mạnh
CB	16	Nguyễn Thành Chung	(yellow card) 57'
CB	5	Đoàn Văn Hậu
RWB	15	Trương Tiến Anh
LWB	3	Nguyễn Văn Vĩ
RM	10	Đỗ Hoàng Hên		(substituted off) 76'
CM	8	Lê Phạm Thành Long		(substituted off) 58'
CM	14	Nguyễn Hoàng Đức (c)
LM	9	Nguyễn Đình Bắc		(substituted off) 90+2'
CF	12	Nguyễn Xuân Son		(substituted off) 58'
Substitutions:
MF	19	Nguyễn Quang Hải		(substituted on) 58'
MF	18	Nguyễn Hai Long		(substituted on) 58'
MF	13	Nguyễn Tài Lộc		(substituted on) 76'
FW	22	Nguyễn Trần Việt Cường		(substituted on) 90+2'
Manager:
(South Korea) Kim Sang-sik

Hyundai Player of the Match:
Lê Giang Patrik (Vietnam)

Assistant referees:
Hesham Al-Refaei (Saudi Arabia)
Saad Al-Subaiee (Saudi Arabia)
Fourth official:
Thoriq Alkatiri (Indonesia)
Video assistant referee:
Muhammad Taqi (Singapore)
Assistant video assistant referee:
Jin Jingyuan (China)

=== Second leg ===
26 August 2026
20:00 UTC+7

Vietnam	2–2	Thailand
Chatchai 52' (o.g.); Wanchai 90+3' (o.g.)	Report	Yotsakorn 12'; Wanchai 85'

Mỹ Đình National Stadium, Hanoi
Attendance: 38,646
Referee: Ahmed Eisa Darwish (United Arab Emirates)

GK	1	Lê Giang Patrik
CB	7	Phạm Xuân Mạnh
CB	16	Nguyễn Thành Chung
CB	5	Đoàn Văn Hậu
RM	15	Trương Tiến Anh
CM	8	Lê Phạm Thành Long	(substituted off) 68'
CM	14	Nguyễn Hoàng Đức (c)	(substituted off) 79'
LM	3	Nguyễn Văn Vĩ	(substituted off) 9'
RF	10	Đỗ Hoàng Hên	(substituted off) 68'
CF	12	Nguyễn Xuân Son
LF	9	Nguyễn Đình Bắc
Substitutions:
DF	24	Phan Tuấn Tài	(substituted on) 9'
MF	19	Nguyễn Quang Hải	(substituted on) 68'
MF	18	Nguyễn Hai Long	(substituted on) 68'
MF	13	Nguyễn Tài Lộc	(substituted on) 79'
Manager:
(South Korea) Kim Sang-sik

GK	20	Chatchai Budprom
RB	12	Waris Choolthong	(yellow card) 86'
CB	2	Nattapong Sayriya
CB	4	Manuel Bihr
LB	13	Oussama Thiangkham		(substituted off) 84'
DM	6	Sarach Yooyen (c)		(substituted off) 84'
RM	9	Yotsakorn Burapha		(substituted off) 69'
CM	5	Seksan Ratree		(substituted off) 69'
CM	7	Kakana Khamyok
LM	21	Chaiyaphon Otton
CF	14	Teerasak Poeiphimai		(substituted off) 88'
Substitutions:
FW	18	Jehhanafee Mamah		(substituted on) 69'
MF	19	Pokklaw Anan		(substituted on) 69'
MF	10	Worachit Kanitsribumphen		(substituted on) 84'
DF	24	Wanchai Jarunongkran		(substituted on) 84'
FW	25	Patrik Gustavsson		(substituted on) 88'
Manager:
(England) Anthony Hudson

Hyundai Player of the Match:
Đỗ Hoàng Hên (Vietnam)

Assistant referees:
Saeed Rashed Almarzooqi (United Arab Emirates)
Yaser Sabeil Almurshidi (United Arab Emirates)
Fourth official:
Muhammad Taqi (Singapore)
Video assistant referee:
Jin Jingyuan (China)
Assistant video assistant referee:
Thoriq Alkatiri (Indonesia)
