= Vietnam national football team results (2020–present) =

Football results

This article provides details of international football games played by the Vietnam national football team from the 2020s.

== Results ==
Key
Win
Draw
Defeat

=== 2020 ===
23 March Friendly	Vietnam	Cancelled	Iraq	Bình Dương, Vietnam
--:-- UTC+7				Stadium: Gò Đậu Stadium
Note: The match was cancelled due to the COVID-19 pandemic.

26 March Friendly	Vietnam	Cancelled	Kyrgyzstan	Bình Dương, Vietnam
--:-- UTC+7		Report		Stadium: Gò Đậu Stadium
Note: The match was cancelled due to the COVID-19 pandemic.

TBD 2020 AFF–EAFF Champions Trophy	Vietnam	Cancelled	South Korea	Hanoi, Vietnam
--:-- UTC+7				Stadium: Mỹ Đình National Stadium
Note: The match was cancelled due to the COVID-19 pandemic.

=== 2021 ===
31 May Friendly	Jordan	1–1	Vietnam	Sharjah, United Arab Emirates
20:45 UTC+4	Faisal 11'	Report	Al-Rawabdeh 40' (o.g.)	Stadium: Khalid bin Mohammed Stadium; Attendance: 0 Referee: Adel Ali Al Naqbi (United Arab Emirates)

7 June 2022 World Cup qualifier R2	Vietnam	4–0	Indonesia	Dubai, United Arab Emirates
20:45 UTC+4	Nguyễn Tiến Linh 51'; Nguyễn Quang Hải 62'; Nguyễn Công Phượng 67'; Vũ Văn Thanh 74'	Report		Stadium: Al Maktoum Stadium; Attendance: 225; Referee: Ahmed Al-Ali (Jordan)

11 June 2022 World Cup qualifier R2	Malaysia	1–2	Vietnam	Dubai, United Arab Emirates
20:45 UTC+4	de Paula 72' (pen.)	Report	Nguyễn Tiến Linh 27'; Quế Ngọc Hải 82' (pen.)	Stadium: Al Maktoum Stadium; Attendance: 335; Referee: Ryuji Sato (Japan)

15 June 2022 World Cup qualifier R2	United Arab Emirates	3–2	Vietnam	Dubai, United Arab Emirates
20:45 UTC+4	Salmeen 32'; Mabkhout 40' (pen.); Al Hammadi 50'	Report	Nguyễn Tiến Linh 85'; Trần Minh Vương 90+3'	Stadium: Zabeel Stadium; Attendance: 1,355; Referee: Ali Sabah (Iraq)

2 September 2022 World Cup qualifier R3	Saudi Arabia	3–1	Vietnam	Riyadh, Saudi Arabia
21:00 UTC+3	Al-Dawsari 55' (pen.); Al-Shahrani 67'; Al-Shehri 80' (pen.)	Report	Nguyễn Quang Hải 3'	Stadium: Mrsool Park; Attendance: 8,331; Referee: Ilgiz Tantashev (Uzbekistan)

7 September 2022 World Cup qualifier R3	Vietnam	0–1	Australia	Hanoi, Vietnam
19:00 UTC+7		Report	Grant 43'	Stadium: Mỹ Đình National Stadium; Attendance: 0 Referee: Abdulrahman Al-Jassim (Qatar)

7 October 2022 World Cup qualifier R3	China	3–2	Vietnam	Sharjah, United Arab Emirates
21:00 UTC+4	Zhang Yuning 53'; Wu Lei 75', 90+5'	Report	Hồ Tấn Tài 80'; Nguyễn Tiến Linh 90'	Stadium: Sharjah Stadium; Attendance: 0 Referee: Mohammed Abdulla Hassan Mohamed (United Arab Emirates)

12 October 2022 World Cup qualifier R3	Oman	3–1	Vietnam	Muscat, Oman
20:00 UTC+4	Al Sabhi 45+1'; Al-Khaldi 49'; Al-Yahyaei 63' (pen.)	Report	Nguyễn Tiến Linh 39'	Stadium: Sultan Qaboos Sports Complex; Attendance: 9,123; Referee: Adham Makhadmeh (Jordan)

11 November 2022 World Cup qualifier R3	Vietnam	0–1	Japan	Hanoi, Vietnam
19:00 UTC+7		Report	Ito 17'	Stadium: Mỹ Đình National Stadium; Attendance: 11,022; Referee: Mohammed Abdulla Hassan Mohamed (United Arab Emirates)

16 November 2022 World Cup qualifier R3	Vietnam	0–1	Saudi Arabia	Hanoi, Vietnam
19:00 UTC+7		Report	Al-Shehri 31'	Stadium: Mỹ Đình National Stadium; Attendance: 9,669; Referee: Hanna Hattab (Syria)

6 December 2020 AFF Championship GS	Laos	0–2	Vietnam	Bishan, Singapore
20:30 UTC+8		Report	Nguyễn Công Phượng 26'; Phan Văn Đức 55'	Stadium: Bishan Stadium; Attendance: 812; Referee: Ahmad Yacoub Ibrahim (Jordan)

12 December 2020 AFF Championship GS	Vietnam	3–0	Malaysia	Bishan, Singapore
20:30 UTC+8	Nguyễn Quang Hải 32'; Nguyễn Công Phượng 36'; Nguyễn Hoàng Đức 89'	Report		Stadium: Bishan Stadium; Attendance: 976; Referee: Ahmed Faisal Al-Ali (Jordan)

15 December 2020 AFF Championship GS	Indonesia	0–0	Vietnam	Bishan, Singapore
20:30 UTC+8		Report		Stadium: Bishan Stadium; Attendance: 928; Referee: Kim Dae-yong (South Korea)

19 December 2020 AFF Championship GS	Vietnam	4–0	Cambodia	Bishan, Singapore
20:30 UTC+8	Nguyễn Tiến Linh 3', 27'; Bùi Tiến Dũng 55'; Nguyễn Quang Hải 57'	Report		Stadium: Bishan Stadium; Attendance: 909; Referee: Yaqoob Abdul Baki (Oman)

23 December 2020 AFF Championship SF	Vietnam	0–2	Thailand	Kallang, Singapore
20:30		Report	Chanathip 14', 23'	Stadium: National Stadium; Attendance: 7,355; Referee: Saoud Ali Al-Adba (Qatar)

26 December 2020 AFF Championship SF	Thailand	0–0 (2–0 agg.)	Vietnam	Kallang, Singapore
20:30 UTC+8		Report		Stadium: National Stadium; Attendance: 8,121; Referee: Ahmad Yacoub Ibrahim (Jordan)

=== 2022 ===
27 January 2022 World Cup qualifier R3	Australia	4–0	Vietnam	Melbourne, Australia
20:10 UTC+11	Maclaren 30'; Rogic 45+2'; Goodwin 72'; McGree 76'	Report		Stadium: Melbourne Rectangular Stadium; Attendance: 27,740; Referee: Ko Hyung-jin (South Korea)

1 February 2022 World Cup qualifier R3	Vietnam	3–1	China	Hanoi, Vietnam
19:00 UTC+7	Hồ Tấn Tài 9'; Nguyễn Tiến Linh 16'; Phan Văn Đức 76'	Report	Xu Xin 90+7'	Stadium: Mỹ Đình National Stadium; Attendance: 6,099; Referee: Nawaf Shukralla (Bahrain)

24 March 2022 World Cup qualifier R3	Vietnam	0–1	Oman	Hanoi, Vietnam
19:00 UTC+7		Report	Al-Hajri 65'	Stadium: Mỹ Đình National Stadium; Attendance: 6,923; Referee: Hanna Hattab (Syria)

29 March 2022 World Cup qualifier R3	Japan	1–1	Vietnam	Saitama, Japan
19:35 UTC+9	Yoshida 55'	Report	Nguyễn Thanh Bình 19'	Stadium: Saitama Stadium 2002; Attendance: 44,600; Referee: Ilgiz Tantashev (Uzbekistan)

1 June Friendly	Vietnam	2–0	Afghanistan	Ho Chi Minh City, Vietnam
19:00 UTC+7	Phạm Tuấn Hải 33', 88'	Report		Stadium: Thống Nhất Stadium; Attendance: 16,500; Referee: Ngô Duy Lân (Vietnam)

21 September 2022 VFF Tri-Nations Series	Vietnam	4–0	Singapore	Ho Chi Minh City, Vietnam
19:00 UTC+7	Nguyễn Văn Quyết 37'; Nguyễn Thanh Nhân 50'; Hồ Tấn Tài 71'; Khuất Văn Khang 84'			Stadium: Thống Nhất Stadium; Referee: Clifford Daypuyat (Philippines)

27 September 2022 VFF Tri-Nations Series	Vietnam	3–0	India	Ho Chi Minh City, Vietnam
19:00 UTC+7	Phan Văn Đức 10'; Nguyễn Văn Toàn 49'; Nguyễn Văn Quyết 70'			Stadium: Thống Nhất Stadium; Referee: Clifford Daypuyat (Philippines)

14 December Friendly	Vietnam	1–0	Philippines	Hanoi, Vietnam
18:00 UTC+7	Nguyễn Văn Quyết 90+2'	Report		Stadium: Hàng Đẫy Stadium; Referee: Wiwat Jumpaoon (Thailand)

21 December 2022 AFF Championship GS	Laos	0–6	Vietnam	Vientiane, Laos
19:00 UTC+7		Report	Nguyễn Tiến Linh 15'; Đỗ Hùng Dũng 43'; Hồ Tấn Tài 56'; Đoàn Văn Hậu 59'; Nguyễn Văn Toàn 82'; Vũ Văn Thanh 90+1'	Stadium: New Laos National Stadium; Attendance: 10,240; Referee: Hiroki Kasahara (Japan)

27 December 2022 AFF Championship GS	Vietnam	3–0	Malaysia	Hanoi, Vietnam
19:30 UTC+7	Nguyễn Tiến Linh 28'; Quế Ngọc Hải 64' (pen.); Nguyễn Hoàng Đức 83'	Report		Stadium: Mỹ Đình National Stadium; Attendance: 17,545; Referee: Ryuji Sato (Japan)

30 December 2022 AFF Championship GS	Singapore	0–0	Vietnam	Kallang, Singapore
20:30 UTC+8		Report		Stadium: Jalan Besar Stadium; Attendance: 5,434; Referee: Hiroki Kasahara (Japan)

=== 2023 ===
3 January 2022 AFF Championship GS	Vietnam	3–0	Myanmar	Hanoi, Vietnam
19:30 UTC+7	Kyaw Zin Lwin 8' (o.g.); Nguyễn Tiến Linh 27'; Châu Ngọc Quang 72'	Report		Stadium: Mỹ Đình National Stadium; Attendance: 11,575; Referee: Choi Hyun-jai (South Korea)

6 January 2022 AFF Championship SF	Indonesia	0–0	Vietnam	Jakarta, Indonesia
16:30 UTC+7		Report		Stadium: Gelora Bung Karno Stadium; Attendance: 49,595; Referee: Omar Al-Yaqoubi (Oman)

9 January 2022 AFF Championship SF	Vietnam	2–0 (2–0 agg.)	Indonesia	Hanoi, Vietnam
19:30 UTC+7	Nguyễn Tiến Linh 3', 47'	Report		Stadium: Mỹ Đình National Stadium; Attendance: 23,989; Referee: Yusuke Araki (Japan)

13 January 2022 AFF Championship F	Vietnam	2–2	Thailand	Hanoi, Vietnam
19:30 UTC+7	Nguyễn Tiến Linh 24'; Vũ Văn Thanh 88'	Report	Poramet 48'; Sarach 63'	Stadium: Mỹ Đình National Stadium; Attendance: 38,539; Referee: Ko Hyung-jin (South Korea)

16 January 2022 AFF Championship F	Thailand	1–0 (3–2 agg.)	Vietnam	Pathum Thani, Thailand
19:30 UTC+7	Theerathon 24'	Report		Stadium: Thammasat Stadium; Attendance: 19,306; Referee: Jumpei Iida (Japan)

15 June Friendly	Vietnam	1–0	Hong Kong	Haiphong, Vietnam
19:30 UTC+7	Quế Ngọc Hải 32' (pen.)	Report		Stadium: Lạch Tray Stadium; Referee: Suhaizi Shukri (Malaysia)

20 June Friendly	Vietnam	1–0	Syria	Nam Định, Vietnam
19:30 UTC+7	Phạm Tuấn Hải 49'			Stadium: Thiên Trường Stadium; Referee: Mohd Yaasin Mohd Hanafiah (Malaysia)

11 September Friendly	Vietnam	2–0	Palestine	Nam Định, Vietnam
19:30 UTC+7	Nguyễn Công Phượng 61'; Phạm Tuấn Hải 78'	Report		Stadium: Thiên Trường Stadium; Referee: Muhammad Taqi (Singapore)

10 October Friendly	China	2–0	Vietnam	Dalian, China
19:35 UTC+8	Wang Qiuming 56'; Wu Lei 90+8'			Stadium: Dalian Sports Center Stadium; Referee: Woo Chun Sing (Hong Kong)

13 October Friendly	Vietnam	0–2	Uzbekistan	Dalian, China
19:35 UTC+8			Urunov 27'; Aliqulov 66'	Stadium: Dalian Pro Academy Base Stadium; Attendance: 0 Referee: Zhang Lei (China)

17 October Friendly	South Korea	6–0	Vietnam	Suwon, South Korea
20:00 UTC+9	Kim Min-jae 5'; Hwang Hee-chan 27'; Võ Minh Trọng 50' (o.g.); Son Heung-min 61'; Lee Kang-in 70'; Jeong Woo-yeong 86'			Stadium: Suwon World Cup Stadium; Attendance: 44,000; Referee: Amirul Izwan Yaacob (Malaysia)

16 November 2026 World Cup qualifier R2	Philippines	0–2	Vietnam	Manila, Philippines
19:00 UTC+8		Report (FIFA); Report (AFC)	Nguyễn Văn Toàn 16'; Nguyễn Đình Bắc 90+4'	Stadium: Rizal Memorial Stadium; Attendance: 10,378; Referee: Rustam Lutfullin (Uzbekistan)

21 November 2026 World Cup qualifier R2	Vietnam	0–1	Iraq	Hanoi, Vietnam
19:00 UTC+7		Report (FIFA); Report (AFC)	Ali 90+7'	Stadium: Mỹ Đình National Stadium; Attendance: 20,568; Referee: Abdulla Al-Marri (Qatar)

=== 2024 ===
9 January Friendly	Kyrgyzstan	2–1	Vietnam	Doha, Qatar
16:00 UTC+3	Kojo 31'; Akmatov 75'	Report	Trương Tiến Anh 63'	Stadium: Al Egla Training Facility Field; Attendance: 0

14 January 2023 AFC Asian Cup GS	Japan	4–2	Vietnam	Doha, Qatar
14:30 UTC+3	Minamino 11', 45'; Nakamura 45+5'; Ueda 85'	Report	Nguyễn Đình Bắc 16'; Phạm Tuấn Hải 33'	Stadium: Al Thumama Stadium; Attendance: 17,385; Referee: Kim Jong-hyeok (South Korea)

19 January 2023 AFC Asian Cup GS	Vietnam	0–1	Indonesia	Doha, Qatar
17:30 UTC+3		Report	Asnawi 42' (pen.)	Stadium: Abdullah bin Khalifa Stadium; Attendance: 7,253; Referee: Sadullo Gulmurodi (Tajikistan)

24 January 2023 AFC Asian Cup GS	Iraq	3–2	Vietnam	Al Rayyan, Qatar
14:30 UTC+3	Sulaka 47'; Hussein 73', 90+12' (pen.)	Report	Bùi Hoàng Việt Anh 42'; Nguyễn Quang Hải 90+1'	Stadium: Jassim bin Hamad Stadium; Attendance: 8,932; Referee: Nazmi Nasaruddin (Malaysia)

21 March 2026 World Cup qualifier R2	Indonesia	1–0	Vietnam	Jakarta, Indonesia
20:30 UTC+7	Egy 52'	Report		Stadium: Gelora Bung Karno Stadium; Attendance: 57,696; Referee: Salman Falahi (Qatar)

26 March 2026 World Cup qualifier R2	Vietnam	0–3	Indonesia	Hanoi, Vietnam
19:00 UTC+7		Report	Idzes 9'; Oratmangoen 23'; Sananta 90+8'	Stadium: Mỹ Đình National Stadium; Attendance: 27,832; Referee: Alireza Faghani (Australia)

6 June 2026 World Cup qualifier R2	Vietnam	3–2	Philippines	Hanoi, Vietnam
19:00 UTC+7	Nguyễn Tiến Linh 65', 76'; Phạm Tuấn Hải 90+5'	Report	Reichelt 62'; Ingreso 89'	Stadium: Mỹ Đình National Stadium; Attendance: 11,568; Referee: Hanna Hattab (Syria)

11 June 2026 World Cup qualifier R2	Iraq	3–1	Vietnam	Basra, Iraq
21:00 UTC+3	H. Ali 12'; Jasim 71'; Hussein 90+2'	Report	Phạm Tuấn Hải 84'	Stadium: Basra International Stadium; Attendance: 42,791; Referee: Omar Al-Ali (United Arab Emirates)

5 September 2024 LPBank Cup	Vietnam	0–3	Russia	Hanoi, Vietnam
20:00 UTC+7		Report	Kuzyayev 24'; Vũ Văn Thanh 62' (o.g.); Musayev 77'	Stadium: Mỹ Đình National Stadium; Attendance: 5,000; Referee: Yusri Mohamad (Malaysia)

10 September 2024 LPBank Cup	Vietnam	1–2	Thailand	Hanoi, Vietnam
20:00 UTC+7	Nguyễn Tiến Linh 21'	Report	Suphanat 26'; Gustavsson 40'	Stadium: Mỹ Đình National Stadium; Attendance: Suhaizi Shukri (Malaysia)

9 October 2024 VFF Tri-Nations Series	Vietnam	Cancelled	India	Nam Định, Vietnam
18:00 UTC+7		Report		Stadium: Thiên Trường Stadium
Note: Tournament cancelled due to Lebanon pulling out following the 2024 Israeli invasion of Lebanon

12 October Friendly	Vietnam	1–1	India	Nam Định, Vietnam
18:00 UTC+7	Bùi Vĩ Hào 38'	Report	Choudhary 53'	Stadium: Thiên Trường Stadium; Referee: Choi Hyun-jai (South Korea)

15 October 2024 VFF Tri-Nations Series	Vietnam	Cancelled	Lebanon	Nam Định, Vietnam
18:00 UTC+7		Report		Stadium: Thiên Trường Stadium
Note: Tournament cancelled due to Lebanon pulling out following the 2024 Israeli invasion of Lebanon

9 December 2024 ASEAN Championship GS	Laos	1–4	Vietnam	Vientiane, Laos
20:00 UTC+7	Bounkong 90+5' (pen.)	Report	Nguyễn Hai Long 58'; Nguyễn Tiến Linh 63'; Nguyễn Văn Toàn 69'; Nguyễn Văn Vĩ 82'	Stadium: New Laos National Stadium; Attendance: 10,685; Referee: Ko Hyung-jin (South Korea)

15 December 2024 ASEAN Championship GS	Vietnam	1–0	Indonesia	Phú Thọ, Vietnam
20:00 UTC+7	Nguyễn Quang Hải 77'	Report		Stadium: Việt Trì Stadium; Attendance: 16,669; Referee: Abdullah Al Shehri (Saudi Arabia)

18 December 2024 ASEAN Championship GS	Philippines	1–1	Vietnam	Manila, Philippines
21:00 UTC+8	Gayoso 68'	Report	Doãn Ngọc Tân 90+7'	Stadium: Rizal Memorial Stadium; Referee: Akobirxuja Shukurullaev (Uzbekistan)

21 December 2024 ASEAN Championship GS	Vietnam	5–0	Myanmar	Phú Thọ, Vietnam
20:00 UTC+7	Bùi Vĩ Hào 48'; Nguyễn Xuân Son 55', 90'; Nguyễn Quang Hải 74'; Nguyễn Tiến Linh 90+2'	Report		Stadium: Việt Trì Stadium; Referee: Koki Nagamine (Japan)

26 December 2024 ASEAN Championship SF	Singapore	0–2	Vietnam	Kallang, Singapore
			Nguyễn Tiến Linh 90+11' (pen.); Nguyễn Xuân Son 90+14'	Stadium: Jalan Besar Stadium; Attendance: 3,400; Referee: Kim Woo-Sung (South Korea)

29 December 2024 ASEAN Championship SF	Vietnam	3–1 (5–1 agg.)	Singapore	Phú Thọ, Vietnam
	Nguyễn Xuân Son 45+1' (pen.), 63'; Nguyễn Tiến Linh 90+3'		Nakamura 74'	Stadium: Việt Trì Stadium; Attendance: 15,884; Referee: Rustam Lutfullin (Uzbekistan)

=== 2025 ===
2 January 2024 ASEAN Championship F	Vietnam	2–1	Thailand	Phú Thọ, Vietnam
20:00 UTC+7	Nguyễn Xuân Son 59', 73'	Report	Chalermsak 83'	Stadium: Việt Trì Stadium; Attendance: 15,604; Referee: Salman Ahmad Falahi (Qatar)

5 January 2024 ASEAN Championship F	Thailand	2–3 (3–5 agg.)	Vietnam	Bangkok, Thailand
20:00 UTC+7	Davis 28'; Supachok 64'	Report	Phạm Tuấn Hải 8'; Pansa 82' (o.g.); Nguyễn Hai Long 90+20'	Stadium: Rajamangala Stadium; Attendance: 46,982; Referee: Ko Hyung-jin (South Korea)

19 March Friendly	Vietnam	2–1	Cambodia	Bình Dương, Vietnam
19:30 UTC+7	Nguyễn Hai Long 26'; Nguyễn Văn Vĩ 35'	Report	Samuel 64'	Stadium: Gò Đậu Stadium; Referee: Tam Ping Wun (Hong Kong)

25 March 2027 AFC Asian Cup qualifier	Vietnam	5–0	Laos	Bình Dương, Vietnam
19:30 UTC+7	Châu Ngọc Quang 11'; Nguyễn Văn Vĩ 44', 50'; Nguyễn Hai Long 63'; Nguyễn Quang Hải 84'	Report		Stadium: Gò Đậu Stadium; Attendance: 11,068; Referee: Yahya Ali Almulla (United Arab Emirates)

10 June 2027 AFC Asian Cup qualifier	Malaysia	0–3 (awarded) (Note: On 26 September 2025, FIFA sanctioned the Football Association of Malaysia and seven players for using falsified eligibility documents. The seven players all played in the match against Vietnam. On 17 March 2026, the wins against Nepal and Vietnam were overturned to 0-3 defeats.)	Vietnam	Kuala Lumpur, Malaysia
21:00 UTC+8	Figueiredo 49'; Holgado 58'; Corbin-Ong 67'; Cools 88'	Report		Stadium: Bukit Jalil National Stadium; Attendance: 61,512; Referee: Hussein Abu Yehia (Lebanon)

9 October 2027 AFC Asian Cup qualifier	Vietnam	3–1	Nepal	Ho Chi Minh City, Vietnam
19:30 UTC+7	Nguyễn Tiến Linh 9'; Phạm Xuân Mạnh 67'; Nguyễn Văn Vĩ 72'	Report; Report (AFC)	Sanish 17'	Stadium: Gò Đậu Stadium; Attendance: 8,597; Referee: Choi Hyun-jai (South Korea)

14 October 2027 AFC Asian Cup qualifier	Nepal	0–1	Vietnam	Ho Chi Minh City, Vietnam
19:30 UTC+7		Report; Report (AFC)	Suman 5' (o.g.)	Stadium: Thống Nhất Stadium (Note: Stadiums in Nepal do not meet AFC requirements, Nepal will be required to play their home matches at a neutral venue.); Attendance: 6,870; Referee: Mohamed Khaled (Bahrain)

19 November (Note: The match between Laos v Vietnam was postponed to 19 November 2025 (originally 18 November 2025) due to reasons related to organization and travel of the host team.) 2027 AFC Asian Cup qualifier	Laos	0–2	Vietnam	Vientiane, Laos
19:00 UTC+7		Report; Report (AFC)	Nguyễn Xuân Son 67' (pen.); Phạm Tuấn Hải 90+2'	Stadium: New Laos National Stadium; Attendance: 16,250; Referee: Ali Reda (Lebanon)

=== 2026 ===
26 March Friendly	Vietnam	3–0	Bangladesh	Hanoi, Vietnam
19:00 UTC+7	Phạm Tuấn Hải 8'; Phạm Xuân Mạnh 18'; Nguyễn Hai Long 38'	Report		Stadium: Hàng Đẫy Stadium; Referee: Cheung Wai Lung Mario (Hong Kong)

31 March 2027 AFC Asian Cup qualifier	Vietnam	3–1	Malaysia	Ninh Bình, Vietnam
19:00 UTC+7	Đỗ Duy Mạnh 6'; Nguyễn Xuân Son 51', 59'	Report; Report (AFC)	Endrick 77' (pen.)	Stadium: Thiên Trường Stadium; Attendance: 19,518; Referee: Chae Sang-hyeop (South Korea)

18 July Friendly	Vietnam	4–0	Myanmar	Thái Nguyên, Vietnam
19:00 UTC+7	Nguyễn Xuân Son 5'; Phạm Xuân Mạnh 39'; Đỗ Hoàng Hên 59'; Nguyễn Đình Bắc 90+1' (pen.)	Report		Stadium: Thái Nguyên Stadium; Referee: Torphong Somsing (Thailand)

24 July 2026 ASEAN Championship GS	Timor-Leste	0–7	Vietnam	Chonburi, Thailand
20:30 UTC+7		Report	Đỗ Hoàng Hên 7', 41'; Nguyễn Đình Bắc 31', 42', 65'; Nguyễn Xuân Son 45+1'; Nguyễn Quang Hải 79'	Stadium: Chonburi Stadium; Referee: Jin Jingyuan (China)

31 July 2026 ASEAN Championship GS	Vietnam	0–0	Singapore	Hanoi, Vietnam
20:00 UTC+7		Report		Stadium: Mỹ Đình National Stadium; Attendance: 31,569; Referee: Hiroki Kasahara (Japan)

3 August 2026 ASEAN Championship GS	Indonesia	0–3	Vietnam	Bogor, Indonesia
20:30 UTC+7		Report	Nguyễn Văn Vĩ 6'; Nguyễn Hai Long 14'; Nguyễn Xuân Son 71'	Stadium: Pakansari Stadium; Referee: Tim Danaskos (Australia)

7 August 2026 ASEAN Championship GS	Vietnam	3–1	Cambodia	Hanoi, Vietnam
20:00 UTC+7	Nguyễn Đình Bắc 18', 89'; Vakhim 84' (o.g.)	Report	Bento 71'	Stadium: Mỹ Đình National Stadium; Referee: Cheung Wai Lung Mario (Hong Kong)

16 August 2026 ASEAN Championship SF	Malaysia	0–2	Vietnam	Kuala Lumpur, Malaysia
21:00 UTC+8		Report	Nguyễn Xuân Son 45+5'; Faris Danish 86' (o.g.)	Stadium: Kuala Lumpur Stadium; Referee: Rustam Lutfullin (Uzbekistan)

19 August 2026 ASEAN Championship SF	Vietnam	2–0 (4–0 agg.)	Malaysia	Hanoi, Vietnam
20:00 UTC+7	Nguyễn Xuân Son 62', 89'	Report		Stadium: Mỹ Đình National Stadium; Attendance: 37,966; Referee: Yusuke Ohashi (Japan)

22 August 2026 ASEAN Championship Final	Thailand	0–2	Vietnam	Bangkok, Thailand
20:00 UTC+7		Report	Nguyễn Hai Long 62'; Nguyễn Quang Hải 69'	Stadium: Rajamangala Stadium; Attendance: 26,415; Referee: Sami Al-Ismail (Saudi Arabia)

26 August 2026 ASEAN Championship Final	Vietnam	2–2 (4–2 agg.)	Thailand	Hanoi, Vietnam
20:00 UTC+7	Chatchai 52' (o.g.); Wanchai 90+3' (o.g.)	Report	Yotsakorn 12'; Wanchai 85'	Stadium: Mỹ Đình National Stadium; Attendance: 38,646; Referee: Ahmed Eisa Darwish (United Arab Emirates)

26 September 2026 FIFA ASEAN Cup GS	Vietnam	1–0	Philippines	Bandung, Indonesia
20:02 UTC+7	Nguyễn Đình Bắc 25'	Report		Stadium: Si Jalak Harupat Stadium; Referee: Thoriq Alkatiri (Indonesia)
Note: The match, originally scheduled for 19:30, was delayed for 32 minutes due to weather conditions.

29 September 2026 FIFA ASEAN Cup GS	Thailand	2–0	Vietnam	Bandung, Indonesia
19:30 UTC+7	Sarach 10'; Chaiyaphon 90+2'	Report		Stadium: Si Jalak Harupat Stadium; Referee: Ben Abraham (Australia)

2 October 2026 FIFA ASEAN Cup GS	Vietnam	4–2	Pakistan	Jakarta, Indonesia
16:00 UTC+7	Nguyễn Hai Long 51'; Nguyễn Hoàng Đức 57'; Nguyễn Đình Bắc 80'; Williams Minh Hoàng 90+1'	Report	Mohib 31'; A. Khan 88'	Stadium: Gelora Bung Karno Stadium; Referee: Muhammad Taqi (Singapore)

5 October 2026 FIFA ASEAN Cup 3rd place	Malaysia	1–0	Vietnam	Jakarta, Indonesia
16:00 UTC+7	Tierney 62'	Report		Stadium: Gelora Bung Karno Stadium; Referee: Ko Hyung-jin (South Korea)

11 November 2026 Casper Cup	Vietnam	2–0	Chinese Taipei	Ninh Bình, Vietnam
19:00 UTC+7	Olaha Mạnh Đức 21'; Nguyễn Đình Bắc 58'	Report		Stadium: Thiên Trường Stadium; Attendance: 2,148; Referee: Nawal Zubir (Malaysia)

17 November 2026 Casper Cup	Vietnam	1–2	Kyrgyzstan	Ninh Bình, Vietnam
19:00 UTC+7	Nguyễn Đình Bắc 19'	Report	Kichin 86'; Atabayev 88'	Stadium: Thiên Trường Stadium; Attendance: 5,102; Referee: Nawal Zubir (Malaysia)

30 December 2026 Kirin Challenge Cup	Japan	Cancelled	Vietnam	Suita, Japan
--:-- UTC+9				Stadium: Suita City Football Stadium
Note: The match was cancelled following the postponement of the 2027 AFC Asian Cup.

=== 2027 ===
5 January Friendly	Qatar	Cancelled	Vietnam	Doha, Qatar
--:-- UTC+7
Note: The match was cancelled following the postponement of the 2027 AFC Asian Cup.

December 2027 AFC Asian Cup GS	United Arab Emirates	v	Vietnam	Riyadh, Saudi Arabia
--:-- UTC+3				Stadium: Imam Mohammad Ibn Saud University Stadium

December 2027 AFC Asian Cup GS	Vietnam	v	South Korea	Riyadh, Saudi Arabia
--:-- UTC+3				Stadium: Kingdom Arena

=== 2028 ===
January 2027 AFC Asian Cup GS	Vietnam	v	Yemen	Jeddah, Saudi Arabia
--:-- UTC+3				Stadium: Prince Abdullah Al Faisal Sports City Stadium

== Head-to-head records ==
As of 17 November 2026

Vietnam national football team head-to-head records
Opponents	Pld	W	D	L	GF	GA	GD	Pts	Confederation
Afghanistan	1	1	0	0	2	0	+2	3	AFC
Australia	2	0	0	2	0	5	–5	0	AFC
Bangladesh	1	1	0	0	3	0	+3	3	AFC
Cambodia	3	3	0	0	9	2	+7	9	AFC
China	3	1	0	2	5	6	–1	3	AFC
Chinese Taipei	1	1	0	0	2	0	+2	3	AFC
Hong Kong	1	1	0	0	1	0	+1	3	AFC
India	2	1	1	0	4	1	+3	4	AFC
Indonesia	9	4	2	3	10	5	+2	14	AFC
Iraq	3	0	0	3	3	7	–4	0	AFC
Japan	3	0	1	2	3	6	–3	1	AFC
Jordan	1	0	1	0	1	1	0	1	AFC
Kyrgyzstan	2	0	0	2	2	4	–2	0	AFC
Laos	5	5	0	0	19	1	+18	15	AFC
Malaysia	8	7	0	1	18	3	+15	21	AFC
Myanmar	3	3	0	0	12	0	+12	9	AFC
Nepal	2	2	0	0	4	1	+3	6	AFC
Oman	2	0	0	2	1	4	–3	0	AFC
Pakistan	1	1	0	0	4	2	+2	3	AFC
Palestine	1	1	0	0	2	0	+2	3	AFC
Philippines	5	4	1	0	8	3	+5	13	AFC
Russia	1	0	0	1	0	3	–3	0	UEFA
Saudi Arabia	2	0	0	2	1	4	–3	0	AFC
Singapore	5	3	2	0	9	1	+8	10	AFC
South Korea	1	0	0	1	0	6	–6	0	AFC
Syria	1	1	0	0	1	0	+1	3	AFC
Thailand	10	3	3	4	12	14	–2	12	AFC
Timor-Leste	1	1	0	0	7	0	+7	3	AFC
United Arab Emirates	1	0	0	1	2	3	–1	0	AFC
Uzbekistan	1	0	0	1	0	2	–2	0	AFC
Yemen	0	0	0	0	0	0	0	0	AFC
