= Yên Phong =

Yên Phong may refer to several places in Vietnam, including:

- Yên Phong, Bắc Ninh: a ward of Bắc Ninh city
- Yên Phong, Thái Nguyên: a commune of Thái Nguyên province
- Yên Phong district: a former district of Bắc Ninh province
