= Oussama Thiangkham =

Thai footballer (born 2003)

Personal information
- Full name: Oussama Thiangkham
- Date of birth: 4 November 2003 (age 23)
- Place of birth: Casablanca, Morocco
- Height: 1.88 m (6 ft 2 in)
- Position: Defender

Team information
- Current team: PT Prachuap
- Number: 2

Youth career
- 2013–2016: Wydad AC
- 2016–2022: Association Jeunesse Sportive

Senior career*
Years	Team	Apps	(Gls)
2022–2025	Association Jeunesse Sportive	20	(0)
2025–	PT Prachuap	11	(0)

International career^{‡}
2026	Thailand U23	5	(0)
2026–	Thailand	7	(0)
Medal record
Thailand
ASEAN Championship
Runner-up	Hyundai Cup 2026	Team
- * Club domestic league appearances and goals as of 04:22, 13 July 2026 (UTC) ‡ National team caps and goals as of 26 August 2026

Oussama Thiangkham (Thai: อูแซมมา เทียงคาม, Arabic: أسامة ثيانجخام; born 4 November 2003) is a professional footballer who plays as a defender for PT Prachuap. Born in Morocco, he plays for the Thailand national team.

== Early life ==
Thiangkham was born on 4 November 2003. Born in Casablanca, Morocco, he was born to a Moroccan mother and a Thai father.

== Club career ==
As a youth player, Thiangkham joined the youth academy of Moroccan side Wydad AC. Following his stint there, he joined the youth academy of Moroccan side Association Jeunesse Sportive and was promoted to the club's senior team in 2022. Ahead of the 2025–26 season, he signed for Thai side PT Prachuap FC.

== International career ==
Thiangkham is a Thailand youth international. During January 2026, he played for the Thailand national under-23 football team at the 2026 AFC U-23 Asian Cup.

Thiangkham would later be called up to the senior team for the 2026 ASEAN Championship. He made his international debut on 25 July in the match against Laos at the New Laos National Stadium, coming off the bench in the 60th minute to replace Wanchai Jarunongkran.

== Style of play ==
Thiangkham plays as a defender. Thai news website TrueID wrote in that his "preferred position is left-back , but he can also play as a center-back. His strengths include his physical prowess, height (188 cm), and excellent fitness, allowing him to tirelessly run up and down the pitch".

== Honours ==
=== Thailand ===
- King's Cup: 2026
