= Geovane Magno =

Brazilian-Vietnamese footballer (born 1994)

Nguyễn Tài Lộc Geovane Magno
Personal information
- Full name: Geovane Magno Cândido Silveira
- Date of birth: 14 April 1994 (age 32)
- Place of birth: Governador Valadares, Minas Gerais, Brazil
- Height: 1.88 m (6 ft 2 in)
- Positions: Attacking midfielder; forward

Team information
- Current team: Ninh Binh
- Number: 94

Youth career
- –2013: São Carlos
- 2014: Paraibano

Senior career*
Years	Team	Apps	(Gls)
2014–2016	Primavera	23	(3)
2016	Grêmio Prudente	17	(3)
2017	Matonense	15	(1)
2017	Primavera	5	(1)
2018	São Carlos	12	(3)
2018	Penapolense	0	(0)
2019	Maringá	12	(1)
2019–2020	Saigon	33	(12)
2020–2021	Hanoi FC	11	(6)
2021–2023	Viettel	25	(9)
2023–2024	Cong An Hanoi	24	(2)
2024–2025	Hong Linh Ha Tinh	20	(6)
2025–	Ninh Binh	26	(9)

International career^{‡}
2026–	Vietnam	11	(0)
- * Club domestic league appearances and goals as of 7 November 2026 ‡ National team caps and goals as of 2 October 2026

Geovane Magno Cândido Silveira (born 14 April 1994), simply known as Geovane or as Nguyễn Tài Lộc, is a professional footballer who plays as an attacking midfielder or forward for V.League 1 club Ninh Binh. Born in Brazil, he plays for the Vietnam national team.

== Club career ==
Geovane began his career in 2014 and played in Brazil for clubs including Primavera, Matonense, São Carlos and Maringá. He relocated to Vietnam 2019 and subsequently played for Sài Gòn, Hanoi FC, Viettel and Hanoi Police.

=== Hong Linh Ha Tinh ===
Geovane signed a new one-year contract with Hong Linh Ha Tinh on 27 August 2024. He swiftly became a vital member in the team. During his debut season, he shown excellent skills, including a memorable hat-trick against SHB Đà Nẵng on 22 September 2024. He scored with a close-range shot and a successful penalty kick. Throughout the current season, he has consistently performed well, scoring three goals in nine games, highlighting his importance to the team's success.

=== Ninh Binh ===
In August 2025, Geovane signed for V.League 1 fellow Ninh Binh.

== International career ==
In June 2026, Geovane was called up to the Vietnam national team, being named in the preliminary squad for the 2026 ASEAN Championship.

On July 18, Geovane made his debut for Vietnam national team against Myanmar national team.

== Personal life ==
On 29 April 2026, Geovane officially obtained Vietnamese citizenship with the Vietnamese personal name Nguyễn Tài Lộc.

== Career statistics ==
=== Club ===
As of match played 7 November 2026

Appearances and goals by club, season and competition
Club	Season	League			State league		National cup		Other		Total	
Club	Season	Division	Apps	Goals	Apps	Goals	Apps	Goals	Apps	Goals	Apps	Goals
Primavera	2014	Paulista Segunda Divisão	—		6	1	—		—		6	1
Primavera	2015	Paulista A3	—		3	0	—		5 (Note: Appearance in Copa Paulista)	1	8	1
Primavera	2016	Paulista A3	—		14	2	—		—		14	2
Primavera	Total		—		23	3	—		5	1	28	4
Grêmio Prudente	2016	Paulista Segunda Divisão	—		17	3	—		—		17	3
Matonense	2017	Paulista A3	—		15	1	—		—		15	1
Primavera	2017	Paulista Segunda Divisão	—		5	1	—		—		5	1
São Carlos	2018	Paulista A3	—		12	3	—		—		12	3
Penapolense	2018	Paulista A3	—		—		—		8	0	8	0
Maringá	2019	Série D	1	0	11	1	—		—		12	1
Saigon	2019	V.League 1	13	4	—		1	0	—		14	4
Saigon	2020	V.League 1	20	8	—		0	0	—		20	8
Saigon	Total		33	12	—		1	0	—		34	12
Hanoi FC	2021	V.League 1	11	6	—		0	0	1 (Note: Appearance in Vietnamese Super Cup)	0	12	6
Viettel	2022	V.League 1	24	9	—		1	0	4 (Note: Appearance in AFC Cup)	2	29	11
Viettel	2023	V.League 1	1	0	—		0	0	—		1	0
Viettel	Total		25	9	—		1	0	4	2	30	11
Cong An Hanoi	2023–24	V.League 1	24	2	—		2	0	1	1	27	3
Hong Linh Ha Tinh	2024–25	V.League 1	20	6	—		1	1	—		21	7
Ninh Binh	2025–26	V.League 1	23	9	—		5	3	—		28	12
Ninh Binh	2026–27	V.League 1	3	0	—		0	0	—		3	0
Ninh Binh	Total		26	9	—		5	3	—		31	12
Career total			140	44	83	12	10	4	19	4	252	64

=== International ===
As of match played 26 September 2026

Appearances and goals by national team and year
National team	Year	Apps	Goals
Vietnam	2026	9	0
Total		9	0

== Honours ==
Hanoi FC

- Vietnamese Super Cup: 2020

Cong An Hanoi

- Vietnamese Super Cup runner-up: 2023

Vietnam

- ASEAN Championship: 2026
