= Helm AG =

German chemical company

HELM AG
- Type: Aktiengesellschaft
- Industry: Chemicals distribution, Agriculture, Energy materials
- Founded: 1900
- Founder: Karl Otto Helm
- Headquarters: Hamburg, Germany
- Key people: Stephan Schnabel (CEO)
- Revenue: €5.8 billion (2024)
- Number of employees: 2,257 (2024)
- Website: www.helmag.com

Helm AG (stylised as HELM AG) is a German company headquartered in Hamburg. The group operates in the fields of chemicals, agriculture and energy resources (lithium), primarily as a trader as well as a project developer and producer. Helm maintains more than 100 subsidiaries and shareholdings in around 30 countries across Europe, North and South America, and Asia.

According to Handelsblatt, Helm AG is the fifth-largest chemicals trader worldwide.

== History ==
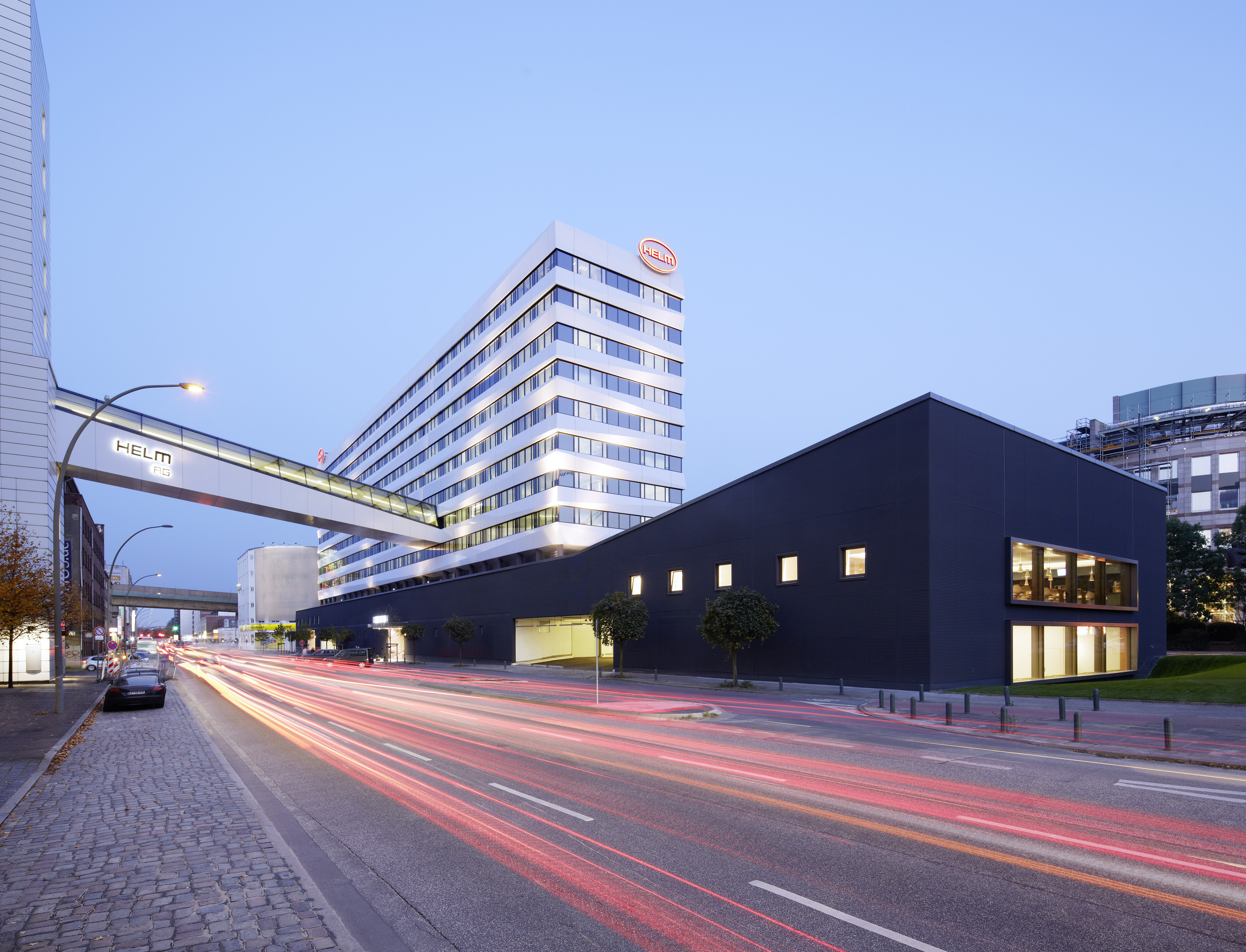
Helm AG headquarters on Nordkanalstraße in Hamburg

=== Founding ===
Helm AG was founded as Karl O. Helm in 1900 by Karl Otto Helm. It was initially an import and export business based in Hamburg. The company traded products such as furniture, porcelain, fragrances, and spices.

=== Takeover by Hermann Schnabel and establishment of the chemical trading business ===
In 1950, Hermann Schnabel acquired the company and expanded it further. He gradually developed the business into the trade of chemical products. Under his leadership, the first international branches were established in Europe and the Americas; in 1962, Helm opened its first foreign office in Copenhagen, followed in 1966 by a branch in Mexico City. This became the company's largest international subsidiary. By 1970, the company employed 300 people. In 1978, it was renamed Helm AG.

In 1981, the company entered the Asian market by opening an office in Beijing, followed by the establishment of further locations in Asia in subsequent years. As a result of these expansions, the workforce doubled during the 1980s and turnover rose to €557 million. At that time, Helm was already trading in chemicals and primarily active in the field of raw materials.

=== Expansion under Dieter Schnabel ===
In 1984, Dieter Schnabel took over as CEO, becoming the second generation of his family to lead the company. He continued the company's expansion and established further business areas. In addition to trading in chemicals, plant protection products and fertilisers, Dieter Schnabel primarily developed the company's pharmaceuticals division.

In 1986, Helm AG partnered with the U.S.-based company Proman and entered methanol production. This business segment was expanded in the following years with several large-scale methanol plants in Oman, Trinidad and Tobago, and Texas, amongst other locations. Methanol remains the company's largest source of revenue as of 2025.

Following the death of Hermann Schnabel in 2010, Dieter Schnabel joined Helm AG's supervisory board in 2012 and transferred operational leadership to Hans-Christian Sievers, who remained CEO until March 2020.

=== New business areas under Stephan Schnabel ===
In 2020, Stephan Schnabel took over as CEO of the family business in the third generation. Under his leadership, Helm AG began a strategic realignment with investments, acquisitions, and joint ventures in the field of sustainable processes and alternative chemical methods. This included, for example, the joint venture Qore, founded together with Cargill, which is active in the production of bio-based chemicals. Helm AG is also investing in the digitalisation of agriculture and has acquired stakes in apps that can detect plant diseases, amongst other things.

In January 2022, Helm AG founded a joint venture with the British company Leverton Lithium, which now operates under the name Leverton Helm and acts as a wholly owned subsidiary. The company refines and recycles lithium, cleaning and processing it so that it can be reused in various industrial sectors. In 2025, Leverton Helm also entered into a partnership with Altilium, a company operating in the battery and recycling sectors, to establish a sustainable supply chain for lithium in the United Kingdom.

== Company structure ==
Helm AG is headquartered in Hamburg and, as a privately held joint-stock company, has been owned by the Schnabel family since 1950. Stephan Schnabel has led the family business in the third generation as Chief Executive since 2020.

Helm AG has more than 100 branches, shareholdings, and subsidiaries in Europe, Asia, the Americas and Africa. In addition, Helm AG is an investor in several start-ups. The company also pursues a venture client model, including through its unit Helm Horizon, by partnering with start-ups and integrating their developments into its business areas.

In the 2024 financial year, Helm AG generated revenues of €5.8 billion with an average of 2,257 employees. Its largest markets were Europe and the Americas.

== Business areas ==
Helm AG operates in four areas: chemicals, agriculture, energy resources (in particular lithium) and pharmaceuticals. The chemicals division includes basic and intermediate products such as methanol and styrene, which are used, amongst other things, in the paint, adhesives, cosmetics and packaging industries. In agriculture, the company provides chemical crop protection agents, fertilisers and biostimulants. In the field of energy resources, Helm supplies lithium products such as lithium carbonate, lithium hydroxide and lithium chloride, which are used in electromobility, construction, the glass and ceramics industries, the lubricants industry and the chemical industry. In addition, processes are being developed to close material cycles through recycling.

Helm AG also provides services related to marketing, project development, and logistics. The products distributed are directed at various markets and industries.
