= Yên Phong district =

Coordinates: 21.200°N 105.967°E

Yên Phong District Huyện Yên Phong
- District
- Interactive map of Yên Phong District
- Country: Vietnam
- Region: Red River Delta
- Province: Bắc Ninh
- Capital: Chờ

Area
  - Total: 44 sq mi (113 km^{2})

Population (2019 census)
  - Total: 192,674
  - Density: 4,420/sq mi (1,710/km^{2})
- Time zone: UTC+7 (Indochina Time)

Yên Phong is a former rural district of Bắc Ninh province in the Red River Delta region of Vietnam. As of 2019 the district had a population of 192,674. The district covers an area of 113 km^{2}. The district capital lies at Chờ.
