= Trương Tiến Anh =

Vietnamese footballer (born 1999)

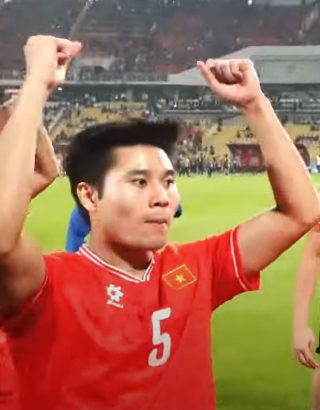
- Tiến Anh in 2025

Personal information
- Full name: Trương Tiến Anh
- Date of birth: 25 April 1999 (age 27)
- Place of birth: Thanh Miện, Hải Dương, Vietnam
- Height: 1.68 m (5 ft 6 in)
- Positions: Winger; right back

Team information
- Current team: Ninh Bình
- Number: 66

Youth career
- 2012–2018: Viettel

Senior career*
Years	Team	Apps	(Gls)
2016–2017	Viettel B		
2018–2026	Thể Công-Viettel	127	(4)
2026–	Ninh Bình	22	(0)

International career^{‡}
2015–2018	Vietnam U19	14	(2)
2023–	Vietnam	32	(1)
Medal record
Men's football
Representing Vietnam
AFF U-19 Youth Championship
Runner-up	Laos 2015	Team
ASEAN Championship
Winner	ASEAN 2024
- * Club domestic league appearances and goals as of 8 November 2026 ‡ National team caps and goals as of 5 October 2026

Trương Tiến Anh (born 25 April 1999) is a Vietnamese professional footballer who plays as a winger or right back for V.League 1 club Ninh Bình and the Vietnam national team.

== Club career ==
Tiến Anh began his career at Viettel, making his professional debut in 2018 and was part of the 2020 V.League 1 winning team. He is a versatile player, being able to operate as a winger and a wing back. He has been compared to that of former striker Trương Việt Hoàng by Vietnamese media.

On 10 December 2025, Tiến Anh signed for V.League 1 fellow Ninh Bình for an undisclosed transfer fee.

== International career ==
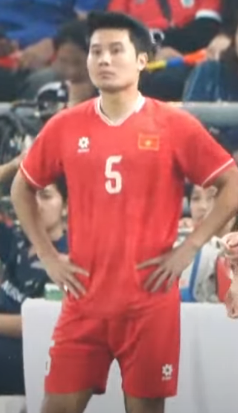
Tiến Anh with Vietnam at the 2024 ASEAN Championship

In June 2023, Tiến Anh was called up to the senior Vietnam squad for first time, for friendlies against Hong Kong and Syria. He made his debut in the former at the Lach Tray Stadium on 15 June as a 36th-minute substitute for Hồ Tấn Tài.

He scored his first international goal in Vietnam's 1–2 defeat against Kyrgyzstan during a friendly. Later, he was named in Vietnam's 26-men squad for the 2023 AFC Asian Cup.

== Career statistics ==
=== Club ===
As of match played 8 November 2026

Appearances and goals by club, season and competition
Club	Season	League			Cup		Continental		Other		Total	
Club	Season	Division	Apps	Goals	Apps	Goals	Apps	Goals	Apps	Goals	Apps	Goals
Thể Công-Viettel	2018	V.League 2	3	0	0	0	—		—		3	0
Thể Công-Viettel	2019	V.League 1	15	1	0	0	—		—		15	1
Thể Công-Viettel	2020	V.League 1	8	0	2	0	—		—		10	0
Thể Công-Viettel	2021	V.League 1	7	0	0	0	6 (Note: Appearances in AFC Champions League)	0	0	0	13	0
Thể Công-Viettel	2022	V.League 1	18	0	1	0	3 (Note: Appearances in AFC Cup)	0	—		22	0
Thể Công-Viettel	2023	V.League 1	18	0	5	1	—		—		23	1
Thể Công-Viettel	2023–24	V.League 1	22	1	3	1	—		—		25	2
Thể Công-Viettel	2024–25	V.League 1	26	2	3	0	—		—		29	2
Thể Công-Viettel	2025–26	V.League 1	10	0	2	0	—		—		12	0
Thể Công-Viettel	Total		127	4	16	2	9	0	0	0	152	6
Ninh Bình	2025–26	V.League 1	15	0	3	0	—		—		18	0
Ninh Bình	2026–27	V.League 1	7	0	0	0	—		—		7	0
Ninh Bình	Total		22	0	3	0	0	0	0	0	25	0
Career total			149	4	19	2	9	0	0	0	177	6

=== International ===
As of match played 26 September 2026

Appearances and goals by national team and year
National team	Year	Apps	Goals
Vietnam	2023	6	0
Vietnam	2024	5	1
Vietnam	2025	7	0
Vietnam	2026	12	0
Total		30	1

Scores and results list Vietnam's goal tally first, score column indicates score after each Tiến Anh goal.

List of international goals scored by Trương Tiến Anh
No.	Date	Venue	Cap	Opponent	Score	Result	Competition
1	9 January 2024	Al Egla Training Field, Doha, Qatar	7	Kyrgyzstan	1–1	1–2	Friendly

== Honours ==
Viettel

- V.League 2: 2018
- V.League 1: 2020

Vietnam

- ASEAN Championship: 2024, 2026
