= Nguyễn Văn Vĩ =

Vietnamese footballer (born 1998)

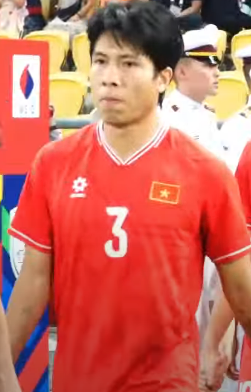
- Văn Vĩ in 2025

Personal information
- Full name: Nguyễn Văn Vĩ
- Date of birth: 12 February 1998 (age 28)
- Place of birth: Yên Phong, Bắc Ninh, Vietnam
- Height: 1.70 m (5 ft 7 in)
- Position: Left-back

Team information
- Current team: Thép Xanh Nam Định
- Number: 17

Youth career
- 2010–2017: Hà Nội

Senior career*
Years	Team	Apps	(Gls)
2018–2022	Hồng Lĩnh Hà Tĩnh	59	(4)
2022–2023	Hà Nội	23	(1)
2023–	Thép Xanh Nam Định	73	(8)

International career^{‡}
2022–	Vietnam	25	(6)
Medal record
Men's football
Representing Vietnam
ASEAN Championship
Winner	ASEAN 2024
- * Club domestic league appearances and goals as of 21 November 2026 ‡ National team caps and goals as of 26 August 2026

Nguyễn Văn Vĩ (born 12 February 1998) is a Vietnamese professional footballer who plays as a left-back for V.League 1 club Thép Xanh Nam Định and the Vietnam national team.

== Club career ==
Graduating from the Hà Nội youth academy, Nguyễn Văn Vĩ made his professional debut for Hà Nội B in the 2018 V.League 2. The club later became Hồng Lĩnh Hà Tĩnh and won the 2019 V.League 2.

In December 2021, Văn Vĩ returned to former club, Hà Nội, signing a two-year contract. His first competitive appearance with Hanoi came in the V.League 1 match against Ho Chi Minh City on 12 March 2022.

In 2023, Văn Vĩ signed for Thép Xanh Nam Định, he won both V.League 1 and Vietnamese Super Cup in his first season.

== International career ==
On 1 June 2022, Văn Vĩ made his debut for the Vietnam national football team as a starter in a friendly match against Afghanistan.

In December 2024, Nguyễn Văn Vĩ was called up by coach Kim Sang-sik as an additional player for the Vietnam national team to participate in the 2024 ASEAN Cup. On 9 December 2024, he scored his first goal from a corner kick in a match against Laos.

== Career statistics ==
=== Club ===
As of match played 21 November 2026

Club	Season	League			Cup		Continental		Other		Total	
Club	Season	Division	Apps	Goals	Apps	Goals	Apps	Goals	Apps	Goals	Apps	Goals
Hồng Lĩnh Hà Tĩnh	2018	V.League 2	17	0	—		—		1 (Note: Appearance in V.League 1 promotion play-off)	0	18	0
Hồng Lĩnh Hà Tĩnh	2019	V.League 2	14	4	0	0	—		—		14	4
Hồng Lĩnh Hà Tĩnh	2020	V.League 1	18	0	3	0	—		—		21	0
Hồng Lĩnh Hà Tĩnh	2021	V.League 1	10	0	0	0	—		—		10	0
Hồng Lĩnh Hà Tĩnh	Total		59	4	3	0	0	0	1	0	63	4
Hà Nội	2022	V.League 1	10	0	3	0	—		—		13	0
Hà Nội	2023	V.League 1	13	1	1	0	—		1 (Note: Appearance in Vietnamese Super Cup)	0	15	1
Hà Nội	Total		23	1	4	0	0	0	1	0	28	1
Thép Xanh Nam Định	2023–24	V.League 1	20	2	4	1	—		—		24	3
Thép Xanh Nam Định	2024–25	V.League 1	25	3	1	0	8 (Note: Appearance in AFC Champions League Two)	0	1	0	35	3
Thép Xanh Nam Định	2025–26	V.League 1	24	1	3	0	5	0	7 (Note: One appearance in Vietnamese Super Cup, six appearances and two goals in ASEAN Club Championship)	2	39	3
Thép Xanh Nam Định	2026–27	V.League 1	4	2	0	0	—		—		4	2
Thép Xanh Nam Định	Total		73	8	8	1	13	0	8	2	102	11
Total career			155	13	15	1	13	0	10	2	193	16

=== International ===
As of match played 7 August 2026

National team	Year	Apps	Goals
Vietnam	2022	1	0
Vietnam	2024	6	1
Vietnam	2025	8	4
Vietnam	2026	6	1
Total		21	6

List of international goals scored by Nguyễn Văn Vĩ
No.	Date	Venue	Opponent	Score	Result	Competition
1.	9 December 2024	New Laos National Stadium, Vientiane, Laos	Laos	4–0	4–1	2024 ASEAN Championship
2.	19 March 2025	Gò Đậu Stadium, Thủ Dầu Một, Vietnam	Cambodia	2–0	2–1	Friendly
3.	25 March 2025	Gò Đậu Stadium, Thủ Dầu Một, Vietnam	Laos	2–0	5–0	2027 AFC Asian Cup qualification
4.	25 March 2025	Gò Đậu Stadium, Thủ Dầu Một, Vietnam	Laos	3–0	5–0	2027 AFC Asian Cup qualification
5.	9 October 2025	Gò Đậu Stadium, Thủ Dầu Một, Vietnam	Nepal	3–1	3–1	2027 AFC Asian Cup qualification
6.	3 August 2026	Pakansari Stadium, Bogor, Indonesia	Indonesia	1–0	3–0	2026 ASEAN Championship

== Honours ==
Hồng Lĩnh Hà Tĩnh

- V.League 2: 2019

Hà Nội

- V.League 1: 2022
- Vietnamese National Cup: 2022
- Vietnamese Super Cup: 2022

Thép Xanh Nam Định

- V.League 1: 2023–24, 2024–25
- Vietnamese Super Cup: 2024

Vietnam

- ASEAN Championship: 2024, 2026

ASEAN All-Stars

- Maybank Challenge Cup: 2025

Individual

- V.League 1 Team of the Season: 2024–25
