= Waris Choolthong =

Thai footballer (born 2004)

Personal information
- Full name: Waris Choolthong
- Date of birth: 8 January 2004 (age 22)
- Place of birth: Trang, Thailand
- Height: 1.80 m (5 ft 11 in)
- Position: Right-back

Team information
- Current team: BG Pathum United
- Number: 81

Youth career
- 2016–2021: Debsirin School

Senior career*
| Years | Team | Apps | (Gls) |
| 2021–2022 | Rajpracha | 2 | (0) |
| 2022– | BG Pathum United | 50 | (3) |

International career^{‡}
| 2022–2023 | Thailand U19 | 4 | (0) |
| 2023– | Thailand U23 | 8 | (1) |
| 2024– | Thailand | 12 | (1) |
Medal record
Men's football
Representing Thailand
FIFA ASEAN Cup
| Runner-up | 2026 Indonesia | Team |
ASEAN Championship
| Runner-up | Hyundai Cup 2026 | Team |
- * Club domestic league appearances and goals as of 9 January 2026 ‡ National team caps and goals as of 5 October 2026

Waris Choolthong (Thai: วาริส ชูทอง; born 8 January 2004) is a Thai professional footballer who plays as a right-back for Thai League 1 club BG Pathum United and the Thailand national team.

== Club career ==
In his youth ages, Waris played for the Debsirin School, before moving to Thai League 2 side Rajpracha after his graduation. There, he made his professional debut. In April 2022, after only six months at Rajpracha, Waris was transferred to BG Pathum United.

== International career ==
In September 2023, Waris featured in Thailand Olympic 21-men squad for the 2022 Asian Games.

In August 2024, Waris received his first call up to the Thailand national team, being named in the squad for the 2024 LPBank Cup.

Waris scored his first international goal on 4 August 2026 against the Philippines during the 2026 ASEAN Championship at the New Clark City Athletics Stadium.

=== International goals ===
| # | Date | Venue | Opponent | Score | Result | Competition |
|---|---|---|---|---|---|---|
| 1. | 4 August 2026 | New Clark City Athletics Stadium, Capas, Philippines | Philippines | 1–0 | 1–0 | 2026 ASEAN Championship |

== Honours ==
BG Pathum United

- Thai League Cup: 2023–24

Thailand U23

- Southeast Asian Games (silver) Silver medal: 2025

Thailand

- FIFA ASEAN Cup runner-up: 2026
