= Chaiyaphon Otton =

Thai footballer (born 2003)

Personal information
- Full name: Chaiyaphon Otton
- Date of birth: 4 April 2003 (age 23)
- Place of birth: Ratchaburi, Thailand
- Height: 1.65 m (5 ft 5 in)
- Positions: Left back; midfielder

Team information
- Current team: Port
- Number: 25

Youth career
- 2018–2022: Nakhon Pathom Municipality Sport School

Senior career*
| Years | Team | Apps | (Gls) |
| 2022–2025 | Nakhon Pathom United | 24 | (1) |
| 2025–2026 | Sukhothai | 26 | (2) |
| 2026– | Port | 0 | (0) |

International career^{‡}
| 2024–2026 | Thailand U23 | 13 | (1) |
| 2026– | Thailand | 10 | (1) |
Medal record
Men's football
Representing Thailand
FIFA ASEAN Cup
| Runner-up | 2026 Indonesia | Team |
ASEAN Championship
| Runner-up | Hyundai Cup 2026 | Team |
SEA Games
| Silver medal – second place | SEA Games 2025 | Football |
ASEAN U-23 Championship
| Third place | ASEAN U-23 mandiri Cup 2025 | 2025 |
- * Club domestic league appearances and goals as of 26 July 2026 ‡ National team caps and goals as of 2 October 2026

Chaiyaphon Otton (Thai: ชัยพล อดทน, pronounced [t͡ɕʰāj.jā.pʰōn ʔòt.tʰōn]; born 4 April 2003) is a Thai professional footballer who plays as a Left back for Thai League 1 club Port and the Thailand national team.

He graduated from Nakhon Pathom Municipal Sports School before signing his first professional contract with Nakhon Pathom United in 2022. He earned his first senior international cap in 2026.

== Club career ==
=== Nakhon Pathom United ===
After graduating from Nakhon Pathom Municipal Sports School, Chaiyaphon attended a trial with Nakhon Pathom United in 2022 and subsequently signed his first professional contract with the club. Initially part of the club's youth setup, he was also named in the senior squad during the 2022–23 season. At the end of the campaign, Nakhon Pathom United won the Thai League 2 title and secured promotion to Thai League 1. Chaiyaphon remained with the club for two seasons in the top flight before the club was relegated at the end of the 2024–25 season.

=== Sukhothai ===
Following Nakhon Pathom United's relegation, Chaiyaphon joined fellow Thai League 1 club Sukhothai ahead of the 2025–26 season. He spent one season with the club.

=== Port ===
Ahead of the 2026–27 season, Chaiyaphon signed with Port.

== International career ==
=== Youth ===
Chaiyaphon represented Thailand at the under-23 level, taking part in the 2025 Doha Cup before competing at the 2025 SEA Games, where Thailand won the silver medal. He later featured at the 2025 ASEAN U-23 Championship, helping Thailand finish third, and subsequently represented Thailand in the 2026 AFC U-23 Asian Cup qualification. He scored his first international goal in a 4–0 friendly victory over India on 15 November 2025.

=== Senior ===
Chaiyaphon was named in Thailand's 25-man squad for the 2026 ASEAN Championship in July 2026. He made his senior international debut on 25 July 2026, starting in a 5–0 win over Laos in the team's opening group-stage match. Chaiyaphon scored his first international goal in the 2026 FIFA ASEAN Cup in a 2–0 win over Vietnam.

== Career statistics ==
=== Club ===
As of 26 July 2026

Appearances and goals by club, season and competition
| Club | Season | League | | | FA cup | | League cup | | Other | | Total | |
| Club | Season | Division | Apps | Goals | Apps | Goals | Apps | Goals | Apps | Goals | Apps | Goals |
|---|---|---|---|---|---|---|---|---|---|---|---|---|
| Nakhon Pathom United | 2022–23 | Thai League 2 | 6 | 0 | 2 | 0 | 3 | 0 | — | | 11 | 0 |
| Nakhon Pathom United | 2023–24 | Thai League 1 | 1 | 0 | 2 | 0 | 1 | 0 | — | | 4 | 0 |
| Nakhon Pathom United | 2024–25 | Thai League 1 | 17 | 1 | 1 | 1 | 1 | 0 | — | | 19 | 2 |
| Nakhon Pathom United | Total | | 24 | 1 | 5 | 1 | 5 | 0 | — | | 34 | 2 |
| Sukhothai | 2025–26 | Thai League 1 | 26 | 2 | 0 | 0 | 0 | 0 | — | | 26 | 2 |
| Sukhothai | Total | | 26 | 2 | 0 | 0 | 0 | 0 | — | | 26 | 2 |
| Port | 2026–27 | Thai League 1 | | | | | | | — | | | |
| Port | Total | | | | | | | | — | | | |

=== International goals ===
Scores and results list Thailand's goal tally first.

| No. | Date | Venue | Opponent | Score | Result | Competition |
|---|---|---|---|---|---|---|
| 1. | 29 September 2026 | Si Jalak Harupat Stadium, Bandung, Indonesia | Vietnam | 2–0 | 2–0 | 2026 FIFA ASEAN Cup |

== Honours ==
Thailand

- FIFA ASEAN Cup runner-up: 2026
