= Yên Phong, Bắc Ninh =

Yên Phong Phường Yên Phong
- Ward
- Yên Phong ward
- Location within Vietnam
- Coordinates: 21°11′47″N 105°57′10″E
- Country: Vietnam
- Region: Red River Delta
- City: Bắc Ninh
- Time zone: UTC+7 (UTC + 7)

Yên Phong is a ward (phường) of Bắc Ninh, Vietnam.
