= Seksan Ratree =

Thai footballer

Personal information
- Full name: Seksan Ratree
- Date of birth: 14 March 2003 (age 23)
- Place of birth: Suphan Buri, Thailand
- Height: 1.77 m (5 ft 9 1/2 in)
- Positions: Attacking midfielder; winger

Team information
- Current team: Port (on loan from Buriram United)
- Number: 17

Youth career
- 2019–2020: Leicester City
- 2020–2022: Buriram United

Senior career*
| Years | Team | Apps | (Gls) |
| 2022– | Buriram United | 22 | (1) |
| 2025– | → Rayong (loan) | 25 | (8) |

International career^{‡}
| 2022 | Thailand U19 | 6 | (0) |
| 2022– | Thailand U23 | 20 | (6) |
| 2024– | Thailand | 29 | (8) |
Medal record
Men's football
Representing Thailand
FIFA ASEAN Cup
| Runner-up | 2026 Indonesia | Team |
ASEAN Championship
| Runner-up | ASEAN 2024 | Team |
| Runner-up | ASEAN 2026 | Team |
- * Club domestic league appearances and goals as of 7 November 2025 ‡ National team caps and goals as of 5 October 2026

Seksan Ratree (Thai: เสกสรรค์ ราตรี, born 14 March 2003), is a Thai professional footballer who plays as an attacking midfielder or a winger for Thai League 1 club Rayong and the Thailand national team.

== Club career ==
Seksan started his football career at Buriram United academy before being scouted by Leicester City academy in 2019. He returned to Buriram United in July 2020 playing for the U18 team before getting promoted to play for the U23 side.

In 2022, Seksan was promoted to the senior squad where he make his official debut in the 2022–23 Thai FA Cup quarter-final match against Phrae United on 1 March 2023 coming on as a substitute. On 20 September 2023, Seksan make his AFC Champions League debut in a 4–1 win over Chinese club Zhejiang Professional.

== International career ==
In November 2024, Seksan was called up by Thailand national team for friendly matches against Lebanon and Laos. He made his debut against Lebanon on 14 November.

Seksan scored his first international goal against Laos on 17 November. In late November, he was selected in the Thailand squad for the 2024 ASEAN Championship.

== International goals ==
Scores and results list Thailand's goal tally first.

| No. | Date | Venue | Opponent | Score | Result | Competition |
|---|---|---|---|---|---|---|
| 1. | 17 November 2024 | Thammasat Stadium, Pathum Thani, Thailand | Laos | 1–0 | 1–1 | Friendly |
| 2. | 8 December 2024 | Hàng Đẫy Stadium, Hanoi, Vietnam | Timor-Leste | 6–0 | 10–0 | 2024 ASEAN Championship |
| 3. | 8 December 2024 | Hàng Đẫy Stadium, Hanoi, Vietnam | Timor-Leste | 7–0 | 10–0 | 2024 ASEAN Championship |
| 4. | 9 October 2025 | Rajamangala Stadium, Bangkok, Thailand | Chinese Taipei | 1–0 | 2–0 | 2027 AFC Asian Cup qualification |
| 5. | 14 October 2025 | Taipei Municipal Stadium, Taipei, Taiwan | Chinese Taipei | 2–0 | 6–1 | 2027 AFC Asian Cup qualification |
| 6. | 13 November 2025 | Thammasat Stadium, Pathum Thani, Thailand | Singapore | 3–1 | 3–2 | Friendly |
| 7. | 5 June 2026 | True BG Stadium, Pathum Thani, Thailand | Kuwait | 1–0 | 2–2 | Friendly |
| 8. | 15 August 2026 | Jalan Besar Stadium, Kallang, Singapore | Singapore | 3–0 | 3–1 | 2026 ASEAN Championship |

== Honours ==
=== Club ===
Buriram United

- Thai League 1: 2022–23, 2023–24, 2024–25
- Thai FA Cup: 2022–23, 2024–25
- Thai League Cup: 2022–23, 2024–25
- ASEAN Club Championship: 2024–25
- Thailand Champions Cup runner-up: 2023

=== International ===
Thailand U-23

- AFF U-23 Championship: 2022: Runner-up
- 2024 ASEAN Championship: Runner-up
- SEA Games: silver medal (2025)

Thailand

- King's Cup: 2026
- FIFA ASEAN Cup: 2026: Runner-up
