= Hêndrio =

Brazilian-Vietnamese footballer (born 1994)

Hêndrio Đỗ Hoàng Hên
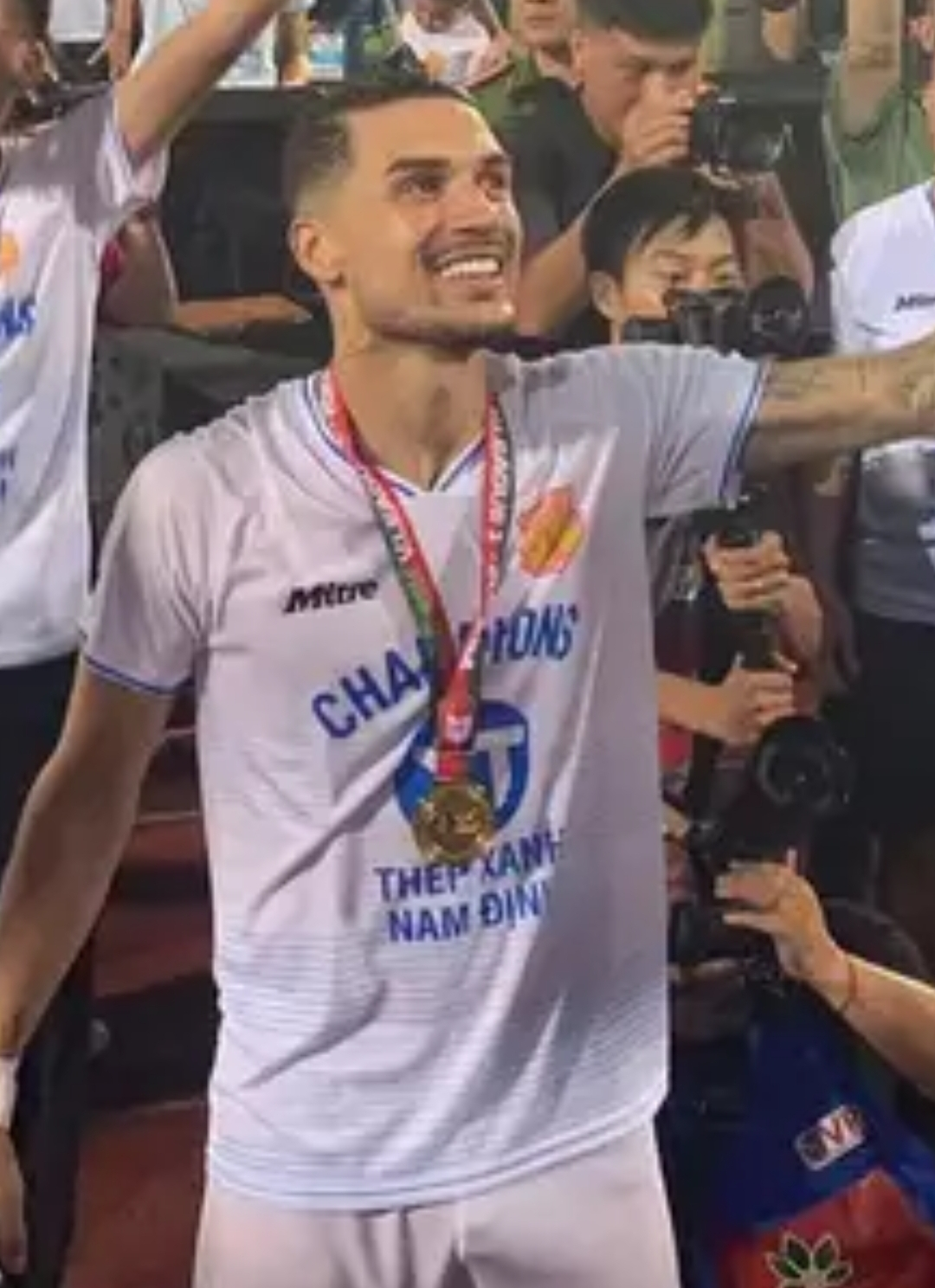
- Hêndrio celebrates winning the 2023–24 V.League 1

Personal information
- Full name: Đỗ Hoàng Hên
- Birth name: Hêndrio Araújo da Silva
- Date of birth: 16 May 1994 (age 32)
- Place of birth: São Paulo, Brazil
- Height: 1.81 m (5 ft 11 in)
- Positions: Attacking midfielder; winger

Team information
- Current team: Hà Nội
- Number: 11

Youth career
- 2006–2010: Barcelona
- 2010–2013: Real Betis
- 2013–2015: Recreativo de Huelva

Senior career*
Years	Team	Apps	(Gls)
2013–2014	Atlético Onubense	16	(2)
2015	Sioni Bolnisi	9	(0)
2017	Varzim B	11	(5)
2017–2018	Paços de Ferreira	5	(0)
2018	Atlético Onubense	5	(0)
2019	Fafe	8	(0)
2019–2020	Don Benito	15	(0)
2020	Moralo	5	(0)
2020	Calvo Sotelo	8	(1)
2021–2022	Topenland Bình Định	35	(9)
2023–2025	Thép Xanh Nam Định	48	(16)
2025–	Hà Nội	21	(11)

International career^{‡}
2026–	Vietnam	13	(3)
- * Club domestic league appearances and goals as of 12 September 2026 ‡ National team caps and goals as of 2 October 2026

Hêndrio Araújo da Silva (born 16 May 1994), simply known as Hêndrio and also as Đỗ Hoàng Hên, is a professional footballer who plays as an attacking midfielder or winger for V.League 1 club Hà Nội. Born in Brazil, he plays for the Vietnam national team.

== Club career ==
At the age of 12, Hêndrio joined the youth academy of Barcelona, one of Spain's most successful clubs and stayed there during four years.

In 2013, Hêndrio signed for Atlético Onubense in the Spanish fourth division.

Before the second half of the 2014–15 season, he signed for Georgian side Sioni.

In 2017, Hêndrio signed for Paços de Ferreira in the Portuguese top flight after playing for Portuguese fourth division team Varzim B, where he made 6 appearances and scored 0 goals.

In 2018, he returned to Atlético Onubense in the Spanish lower leagues.

Before the second half of the 2018–19 season, Hêndrio signed for Portuguese third division outfit Fafe.

A year after, in January 2020, he signed for Moralo in the Spanish fourth division.

=== Career in Vietnam ===
Before the 2021 season, Hêndrio moved to Vietnam, signing for Topenland Bình Định.

After two years at the club, he departed the club to join league fellow Thep Xanh Nam Dinh. Here, Hêndrio played a crucial role to help the team win the 2023–24 V.League 1 title, scoring 10 goals and assisted 13 times.

On 13 May 2025, Hà Nội announced the arrival of Hêndrio to the club ahead of the 2025–26 season with a contract until 2028.

== International career ==
After completing FIFA’s five-year continuous residency requirement in Vietnam, Hêndrio became eligible to represent the Vietnamese national team in January 2026. On 17 March 2026, he received his first call up to the Vietnam national team for the friendly match against Bangladesh and the 2027 AFC Asian Cup qualification match against Malaysia.

He scored his first goal in a friendly match against Myanmar on 18 July 2026

== Personal life ==
After the success of his teammate Nguyễn Xuân Son with Vietnam national team, Hêndrio expressed his wish to become a Vietnamese citizen and represent Vietnam at international level. On 16 October 2025, he officially obtained Vietnamese citizenship with the Vietnamese personal name Đỗ Hoàng Hên.. In addition to his native Portuguese, Hêndrio also speaks English and is conversational in Vietnamese.

== Career statistics ==
=== Club ===
As of match played 20 September 2026

Appearances and goals by club, season and competition
Club	Season	League			National cup		Continental		Other		Total	
Club	Season	Division	Apps	Goals	Apps	Goals	Apps	Goals	Apps	Goals	Apps	Goals
Sioni Bolnisi	2014–15	Umaglesi Liga	9	0	—		—		—		9	0
Varzim B	2016–17	Divisão Liga Pro	11	5	—		—		—		11	5
Paços de Ferreira	2017–18	Primeira Liga	5	0	0	0	—		1 (Note: Appearance in Taça da Liga)	0	6	0
Fafe	2018–19	Campeonato de Portugal	8	0	—		—		1 (Note: Appearance in Campeonato de Portugal promotion play-offs)	0	9	0
Don Benito	2019–20	Segunda División	15	0	0	0	—		—		15	0
Moralo	2019–20	Tercera División	5	0	—		—		—		5	0
Calvo Sotelo	2020–21	Tercera División	8	1	0	0	—		3 (Note: Appearance in Copa Federación de España)	1	11	2
Topenland Bình Định	2021	V.League 1	12	2	0	0	—		—		12	2
Topenland Bình Định	2022	V.League 1	23	7	4	1	—		—		27	8
Topenland Bình Định	Total		35	9	4	1	0	0	0	0	39	10
Thép Xanh Nam Định	2023	V.League 1	16	3	3	1	—		—		19	4
Thép Xanh Nam Định	2023–24	V.League 1	24	10	3	2	—		—		27	12
Thép Xanh Nam Định	2024–25	V.League 1	8	3	0	0	8 (Note: Appearance in AFC Champions League Two)	0	1 (Note: Appearance in Vietnamese Super Cup)	0	17	3
Thép Xanh Nam Định	Total		48	16	6	3	8	0	1	0	63	19
Hà Nội	2025–26	V.League 1	19	11	0	0	—		—		19	11
Hà Nội	2026–27	V.League 1	2	0	1	0	—		—		3	0
Hà Nội	Total		21	11	1	0	0	0	0	0	22	11
Total career			165	42	11	4	8	0	6	1	190	47

=== International ===
As of match played 2 October 2026

Appearances and goals by national team and year
National team	Year	Apps	Goals
Vietnam	2026	11	3
Total		11	3

List of international goals scored by Đỗ Hoàng Hên
No.	Date	Venue	Opponent	Score	Result	Competition
1.	18 July 2026	Thái Nguyên Stadium, Thái Nguyên, Vietnam	Myanmar	3–0	4–0	Friendly
2.	24 July 2026	Chonburi Stadium, Chonburi, Thailand	Timor-Leste	1–0	7–0	2026 ASEAN Championship
3.	24 July 2026	Chonburi Stadium, Chonburi, Thailand	Timor-Leste	3–0	7–0	2026 ASEAN Championship

== Honours ==
Topenland Binh Dinh

- Vietnamese Cup runners-up: 2022

Thep Xanh Nam Dinh

- V.League 1: 2023–24
- Vietnamese Super Cup: 2024

Vietnam

- ASEAN Championship: 2026

Individual

- V.League 1 Team of the Season: 2025–26
