= Wanchai Jarunongkran =

Thai footballer (born 1996)

Personal information
- Full name: Wanchai Jarunongkran
- Date of birth: 18 December 1996 (age 29)
- Place of birth: Bangkok, Thailand
- Height: 1.80 m (5 ft 11 in)
- Position: Left back

Team information
- Current team: Bangkok United
- Number: 24

Youth career
- 2012–2014: Osotspa Saraburi

Senior career*
Years	Team	Apps	(Gls)
2015–2016	RSU	30	(2)
2017–2018	Air Force Central	37	(0)
2018–	Bangkok United	87	(0)
2021–2022	→ Police Tero (loan)	25	(1)

International career^{‡}
2017–2018	Thailand U23	5	(0)
2024–	Thailand	11	(1)
Medal record
Thailand
ASEAN Championship
Runner-up	Hyundai Cup 2026	Team
- * Club domestic league appearances and goals as of 9 January 2026 ‡ National team caps and goals as of 26 August 2026

Wanchai Jarunongkran (Thai: วันชัย จารุนงคราญ, born 18 December 1996) is a Thai professional footballer who plays as a left back for Thai League 1 club Bangkok United and the Thailand national team.

== International career ==
In December 2017, Wanchai play for Thailand U23 in the 2017 M-150 Cup and in 2018, the squad for the 2018 AFC U-23 Championship in China.

On 14 November 2024, Wanchai made his Thailand national team debut in a friendly match against Lebanon.

Wanchai scored his first international goal on 26 August 2026 against Vietnam during the 2026 ASEAN Championship at the Mỹ Đình National Stadium.

== International goals ==
No.	Date	Venue	Opponent	Score	Result	Competition
1.	26 August 2026	Mỹ Đình National Stadium, Hanoi, Vietnam	Vietnam	2–1	2–2	2026 ASEAN Championship

== Honours ==
=== Club ===
Bangkok United

- Thailand Champions Cup: 2023
- Thai FA Cup: 2023–24
