= 2026 ASEAN Championship =

16th edition of the ASEAN Championship

Tournament details
- Dates: 24 July – 26 August
- Teams: 10 (from 1 sub-confederation)
- Venues: 10 (in 10 host cities)

Final positions
- Champions: Vietnam (4th title)
- Runners-up: Thailand

Tournament statistics
- Matches played: 26
- Goals scored: 87 (3.35 per match)
- Attendance: 363,412 (13,977 per match)
- Top scorers: (Vietnam national football team) Nguyễn Đình Bắc; (Vietnam national football team) Nguyễn Xuân Son; (5 goals each)
- Best player: (Vietnam) Nguyễn Đình Bắc
- Best young player: (Thailand) Yotsakorn Burapha
- Best goalkeeper: (Vietnam) Lê Giang Patrik

The 2026 ASEAN Championship (officially the ASEAN Hyundai Cup 2026 for sponsorship reasons), or simply ASEAN Cup 2026, was the 16th edition of the ASEAN Championship, the biennal international men's football championship of Southeast Asia organised by the ASEAN Football Federation (AFF) and was the 1st edition under the name ASEAN Hyundai Cup. The tournament was celebrated as the 30th anniversary of the competition.

The event was held in the summer season from July to August for the first time, instead of the traditional monsoon season near the year-end. Defending champions Vietnam defeated Thailand 4–2 on aggregate in the finals.

The tournament preceded the inaugural 2026 FIFA ASEAN Cup, first announced by FIFA in October 2025.

== Format ==
The 2026 ASEAN Championship followed the current 2018 format. In the current format, the nine highest ranked teams automatically qualified, with the tenth and eleventh-ranked teams playing in a two-legged qualifier. The ten teams were split in two groups of five and played a round-robin system, with each team playing two home and two away fixtures. The top two sides of each group advanced to the knockout stages, consisting of two-legged semi-finals and finals. Away goals rule were not applied, like the previous edition.

=== New rules ===
The 2026 ASEAN Championship introduced several rule changes just like the 2026 FIFA World Cup, primarily designed to reduce time-wasting.

The new rules included:

- Ten-second substitutions: Players being substituted had ten seconds to exit the field; otherwise, the substitute had to wait for one minute before entering the match.
- Five-second restarts: A visual five-second countdown shown by the referee for throw-ins and goal kicks in situations of time-wasting. If the ball was not put into play in time, a restart was awarded to the opposing team; a corner kick was awarded if the infraction occurred with a goal kick.
- Medical treatment: Any outfield player who received medical attention on the field had to wait for one minute before returning to play.
- Expanded video assistant referee (VAR): The VAR could review and overturn wrongly awarded corner kicks, certain attacking fouls, and mistakes on cards.
- Mouth-covering red cards: To stop confrontational or insulting behavior which was concealed to avoid lip-reading, any player who covered his mouth with his hand, arm, or shirt while confronting an opponent was sent off.
- Player leaving the field in protest: Players or officials who left the field in protest were sent off.

Another change was the tiebreaker formula used when two or more teams finished the group stage with an equal number of points. The first tiebreaker criterion was the number of points earned in head-to-head matches between the tied teams, not the goal difference among all matches. (Note: Attributed to multiple references:)

== Qualification ==
Nine teams automatically qualified to the ASEAN Championship final tournament. They were separated in respective pots, based on their performance in the last two editions.

Brunei and East Timor, the two lowest-ranked teams, played a two-legged qualifier to determine the tenth and final qualifier. On 9 June 2026, East Timor beat Brunei 6–1 on aggregate to become the last participant.

Australia, a member since 2013, did not enter the tournament.

=== Qualified teams ===
Team	Appearance	Previous best performance	FIFA Ranking (20 July 2026)
Cambodia	11th	Group stage (1996, 2000, 2002, 2004, 2008, 2016, 2018, 2020, 2022, 2024)	175
Indonesia	16th	Runners-up (2000, 2002, 2004, 2010, 2016, 2020)	118
Laos	15th	Group stage (1996, 1998, 2000, 2002, 2004, 2007, 2008, 2010, 2012, 2014, 2018, 2020, 2022, 2024)	185
Malaysia	16th	Winners (2010)	136
Myanmar	16th	Fourth place / Semi-finalists (2004, 2016)	158
Philippines	15th	Semi-finalists (2010, 2012, 2014, 2018, 2024)	135
Singapore	16th	Winners (1998, 2004, 2007, 2012)	148
Thailand	16th	Winners (1996, 2000, 2002, 2014, 2016, 2020, 2022)	94
Vietnam	16th	Winners (2008, 2018, 2024)	99
Timor-Leste	5th	Group stage (2004, 2018, 2020, 2024)	201

== Draw ==
The tournament's draw was held on 15 January 2026 at RCTI studio in Jakarta, Indonesia at 16:00 UTC+7 (WIB).

The pot placements followed each team's progress based on the two previous editions. If the results were equal, the most recent tournament was given priority.

Vietnam, the defending champions, were automatically placed in A1, while Thailand were placed in B1. Due to political tensions between Thailand and Cambodia, Cambodia and Thailand could not be drawn against each other. Consequently, Cambodia was automatically drawn to Group A and Myanmar to Group B.

At the time of the draw, the identity of the team that secured qualification was unknown and was automatically placed into Pot 5.

Ranking in the two previous tournaments
Pot	Team	2024	2022	AVG
1	Vietnam	1	2	1.5
1	Thailand	2	1	1.5
2	Malaysia	5	3	4
2	Singapore	4	5	4.5
3	Philippines	3	7	5
3	Indonesia	7	4	5.5
4	Cambodia	6	6	6
4	Myanmar	8	8	8
5	Laos	9	9	9
5	Timor-Leste	10	NQ	n/a

== Schedule ==
AFF announced the tournament schedule on 14 November 2025. The group stage took place from 24 July to 8 August 2026. The knockout stage took place from 15 to 26 August 2026.

Group stage	Schedule Matchday	Group A		Group B	
Group stage	Schedule Matchday	Date	Matches	Date	Matches
Group stage	Matchday 1	24 July 2026	4 v 2 5 v 1	25 July 2026	4 v 2 5 v 1
Group stage	Matchday 2	27 July 2026	2 v 5 3 v 4	28 July 2026	2 v 5 3 v 4
Group stage	Matchday 3	31 July 2026	5 v 3 1 v 2	1 August 2026	5 v 3 1 v 2
Group stage	Matchday 4	3 August 2026	3 v 1 4 v 5	4 August 2026	3 v 1 4 v 5
Group stage	Matchday 5	7 August 2026	1 v 4 2 v 3	8 August 2026	1 v 4 2 v 3
Knockout stage	Semi-finals				
Knockout stage	Schedule Leg(s)	Date	Matches	Date	Matches
Knockout stage	First leg	15 August 2026	A2 v B1	16 August 2026	B2 v A1
Knockout stage	Second leg	18 August 2026	B1 v A2	19 August 2026	A1 v B2
Knockout stage	Finals				
Knockout stage	Schedule Leg(s)	Date		Matches	
Knockout stage	First leg	22 August 2026		SF Winner 1 v SF Winner 2	
Knockout stage	Second leg	26 August 2026		SF Winner 2 v SF Winner 1	

== List of officials ==
The following officials were chosen for the competition.

Referees

- (Australia) Tim Danaskos
- (China) Jin Jingyuan
- (Hong Kong) Mario Cheung Wai Lung
- (Japan) Hiroki Kasahara
- (Japan) Koji Takasaki
- (Japan) Yusuke Ohashi
- (Kyrgyzstan) Alimardon Bainazarov
- (Oman) Abdullah Salim Khalfan Al-Amouri
- (Oman) Mahmood Al-Majarafi
- (Malaysia) Zakaria Ismail
- (Qatar) Salman Falahi
- (Saudi Arabia) Sami Al-Ismail
- (United Arab Emirates) Ahmed Eisa Darwish
- (South Korea) Choi Hyun-jai
- (South Korea) Kim Hee-gon
- (South Korea) Kim Woo-sung
- (Uzbekistan) Rustam Lutfullin

Assistant referees

- (Australia) Andrew Meimarakis
- (Australia) Brad Wright
- (China) Tang Chao
- (Hong Kong) Lam Cheuk Hong
- (Indonesia) Bangbang Syamsudar
- (Indonesia) Fajar Furqon
- (Indonesia) Nurhadi Sulchan
- (Japan) Masaru Hasegawa
- (Japan) Takeshi Asada
- (Japan) Tomoyuki Umeda
- (Japan) Satoshi Michiyama
- (Japan) Yusuke Takebe
- (Kyrgyzstan) İsmailjan Talipjanov
- (Oman) Hamed Talib Saif Al Ghafri
- (Oman) Nasser Salim Abdullah Ambusaidi
- (Malaysia) Kesava Raj
- (Malaysia) Muhammad Farhan
- (Malaysia) Muhammad Shafiq bin Ahmad Said
- (Malaysia) Zainal Abidin
- (Qatar) Zahy Snaid Al Shammari
- (Saudi Arabia) Hesham Mohammed Abdullah Al Refaei
- (Saudi Arabia) Saad Al-Subaiee
- (United Arab Emirates) Yaser Sabeil Almurshidi
- (United Arab Emirates) Saeed Rashed Almarzooqi
- (Singapore) Abdul Hannan
- (Singapore) Huang Xin Jie
- (Singapore) Muhammad Syafiq bin Juffri
- (South Korea) Cheon Jin-hee
- (South Korea) Jang Jong-pil
- (South Korea) Park Sang-jun
- (Thailand) Apichit Nophuan
- (Thailand) Pattarapong Kijsathit
- (Thailand) Rawut Nakarit
- (Uzbekistan) Akmal G'iyosov
- (Uzbekistan) Sanzhar Shoyusupov
- (Vietnam) Nguyễn Trung Việt

Fourth officials

- (Indonesia) Naufal Adya Fairuski
- (Indonesia) Thoriq Alkatiri
- (Malaysia) Izzul Fikri Kamaruzaman
- (Malaysia) Mohammad Nawal
- (Malaysia) Zakaria Ismail
- (Malaysia) Tuan Mohd Yaasin bin Tuan Mohd Hanafiah
- (Singapore) Muhammad Taqi
- (Singapore) Ahmad A'Qashah
- (Singapore) Muhammad Zulfiqar
- (Thailand) Alongkorn Khonwai
- (Thailand) Sivakorn Pu-udom
- (Thailand) Wiwat Jumpao-on
- (Vietnam) Hoàng Ngọc Hà
- (Vietnam) Lê Vũ Linh
- (Vietnam) Nguyễn Mạnh Hải

Video assistant officials

- (China) Jin Jingyuan
- (Saudi Arabia) Sami Ahmed Al Jurays
- (Singapore) Muhammad Taqi
- (Singapore) Farhad Mohamed
- (Thailand) Mongkolchai Pechsri
- (Thailand) Sivakorn Pu-udom
- (Thailand) Pansa Chaisanit
- (South Korea) Choi Hyun-jai

== Venues ==
As the tournament was held outside the FIFA International Match Calendar, both Malaysia and Singapore were unable to use their usual home venues.

Malaysia hosted their home matches at Kuala Lumpur Stadium because Bukit Jalil National Stadium was unavailable due to restrictions associated with the Zeon Zoysia pitch sponsorship and usage agreement. Under the agreement, the stadium could only be used for FIFA international windows and designated domestic cup matches to preserve the quality of the playing surface. In addition, Bukit Jalil National Stadium was closed for extensive track and facility upgrade works in preparation for the upcoming 2027 SEA Games, rendering it unavailable for the duration of the campaign.

Meanwhile, Singapore played their home fixtures at Jalan Besar Stadium because the National Stadium was being used for rehearsals and preparations for the country's National Day celebrations.

(Cambodia) Phnom Penh	(Thailand) Bangkok	(Myanmar) Yangon
Morodok Techo National Stadium	Rajamangala Stadium	Thuwunna Stadium
Capacity: 60,000	Capacity: 51,560	Capacity: 50,000
(Vietnam) Hanoi	Location of stadiums of the 2026 ASEAN Championship.	(Indonesia) Bogor
Mỹ Đình National Stadium	Location of stadiums of the 2026 ASEAN Championship.	Pakansari Stadium (Note: Indonesia played their group stage matches in Bogor, before moving to Gelora Bung Karno Stadium in Jakarta if they qualified for the knockout stage.)
Capacity: 40,192	Location of stadiums of the 2026 ASEAN Championship.	Capacity: 30,000
(Laos) Vientiane	Location of stadiums of the 2026 ASEAN Championship.	(Philippines) Capas
New Laos National Stadium	Location of stadiums of the 2026 ASEAN Championship.	New Clark City Athletics Stadium (Note: Philippines played their home matches at the New Clark City Athletics Stadium, as the Rizal Memorial Stadium – Philippines's regular home stadium – was undergoing renovation.)
Capacity: 20,000	Location of stadiums of the 2026 ASEAN Championship.	Capacity: 20,000
(Malaysia) Kuala Lumpur	(Thailand) Chonburi	(Singapore) Kallang
Kuala Lumpur Stadium (Note: Malaysia played their home matches at the Kuala Lumpur Stadium, as the Bukit Jalil National Stadium – Malaysia's regular home stadium – could not be used for tournaments held outside the FIFA International Match Calendar due to restrictions on the Zeon Zoysia playing surface, and was also undergoing renovation works ahead of the 2027 SEA Games.)	Chonburi Stadium (Note: Timor-Leste's home stadium, the National Stadium in Dili, did not meet FIFA standards. They thus played their matches at a neutral venue.)	Jalan Besar Stadium (Note: Singapore played their home matches at the Jalan Besar Stadium, as the National Stadium – Singapore's regular home stadium – was reserved for the National Day Parade on 9 August.)
Capacity: 18,000	Capacity: 8,680	Capacity: 6,500

== Group stage ==
Tie-breaking criteria for group stage ranking
The ranking was determined by the points obtained in group matches. If two or more teams were equal on points, the following criteria were used:
1. Most points obtained in the group matches played between the teams concerned;
2. Superior goal difference in matches played between the teams concerned;
3. Most goals scored in the group matches played between the teams concerned;

If, after having applied criteria a to c, teams still had an equal ranking, criteria a to c were reapplied exclusively to the matches between the teams who were still level to determine their final rankings. If this procedure did not lead to a decision, criteria d to h applied.

4. Superior goal difference in all group matches;
5. Most goals scored in all group matches;
6. Penalty shoot-out if two teams were tied and they met in last round of group
7. Highest team conduct ("fair play") score in all group matches (only one deduction could be applied to a player or team coach/official in a single match):
  - Yellow card: −1 point;
  - Indirect red card (second yellow card): −3 points;
  - Direct red card: −4 points;
  - Yellow card and direct red card: −5 points;
8. Drawing of lots

Group winners and runners-up advanced to the semi-finals.

All times listed are local.

=== Group A ===
Pos	Team	Pld	W	D	L	GF	GA	GD	Pts	Qualification
1	Vietnam	4	3	1	0	13	1	+12	10	Advance to knockout stage
2	Singapore	4	2	2	0	5	2	+3	8	Advance to knockout stage
3	Indonesia	4	2	1	1	9	5	+4	7	
4	Cambodia	4	1	0	3	6	10	−4	3	
5	Timor-Leste	4	0	0	4	0	15	−15	0	

Source: ASEAN United
24 July 2026
19:00 UTC+7

Cambodia	1–2	Singapore
Sovann 55'	Report	Shawal 22'; Ilhan 90+11'

Morodok Techo National Stadium, Phnom Penh
Attendance: 27,790
Referee: Koji Takasaki (Japan)
24 July 2026
20:30 UTC+7

Timor-Leste	0–7	Vietnam
	Report	Đỗ Hoàng Hên 7', 41'; Nguyễn Đình Bắc 31', 42', 65'; Nguyễn Xuân Son 45+1'; Nguyễn Quang Hải 79'

Chonburi Stadium, Chonburi (Thailand)
Attendance: 195
Referee: Jin Jingyuan (China)

27 July 2026
19:00 UTC+8

Singapore	2–0	Timor-Leste
Ilhan 41'; Song Ui-young 56'	Report

Jalan Besar Stadium, Kallang
Attendance: 4,665
Referee: Salman Falahi (Qatar)
27 July 2026
20:30 UTC+7

Indonesia	5–1	Cambodia
Baker 6', 15', 56'; Walsh 24'; Raven 86'	Report	Sokmeng 48'

Pakansari Stadium, Bogor
Attendance: 22,485
Referee: Kim Woo-sung (South Korea)

31 July 2026
17:00 UTC+7

Timor-Leste	0–3	Indonesia
	Report	Pattynama 74'; Haye 78'; Baker 81'

Chonburi Stadium, Chonburi (Thailand)
Attendance: 189
Referee: Choi Hyun-jai (South Korea)
31 July 2026
20:00 UTC+7

Vietnam	0–0	Singapore
	Report

Mỹ Đình National Stadium, Hanoi
Attendance: 31,569
Referee: Hiroki Kasahara (Japan)

3 August 2026
17:30 UTC+7

Cambodia	3–0	Timor-Leste
Soknet 16', 63'; Rado 90'	Report

Morodok Techo National Stadium, Phnom Penh
Attendance: 6,548
Referee: Zakaria Ismail (Malaysia)
3 August 2026
20:30 UTC+7

Indonesia	0–3	Vietnam
	Report	Nguyễn Văn Vĩ 6'; Nguyễn Hai Long 14'; Nguyễn Xuân Son 71'

Pakansari Stadium, Bogor
Attendance: 27,265
Referee: Tim Danaskos (Australia)

7 August 2026
20:00 UTC+7

Vietnam	3–1	Cambodia
Nguyễn Đình Bắc 18', 89'; Vakhim 84' (o.g.)	Report	Bento 71'

Mỹ Đình National Stadium, Hanoi
Attendance: 19,628
Referee: Mario Cheung Wai Lung (Hong Kong)
7 August 2026
21:00 UTC+8

Singapore	1–1	Indonesia
Ilhan 66'	Report	Oratmangoen 47'

Jalan Besar Stadium, Kallang
Attendance: 5,113
Referee: Abdullah Salim Khalfan Al-Amouri (Oman)

=== Group B ===
Pos	Team	Pld	W	D	L	GF	GA	GD	Pts	Qualification
1	Thailand	4	4	0	0	10	0	+10	12	Advance to knockout stage
2	Malaysia	4	3	0	1	7	3	+4	9	Advance to knockout stage
3	Myanmar	4	2	0	2	12	7	+5	6	
4	Philippines	4	1	0	3	5	7	−2	3	
5	Laos	4	0	0	4	3	20	−17	0	

Source: ASEAN United
25 July 2026
16:30 UTC+6:30

Myanmar	1–2	Malaysia
Myat Kaung Khant 10'	Report	Paulo Josué 52', 57' (pen.)

Thuwunna Stadium, Yangon
Attendance: 10,500
Referee: Yusuke Ohashi (Japan)
25 July 2026
20:00 UTC+7

Laos	0–5	Thailand
	Report	Teerasak 11'; Kakana 27', 59'; Yotsakorn 49'; Sarach 52'

New Laos National Stadium, Vientiane
Attendance: 7,678
Referee: Choi Hyun-jai (South Korea)

28 July 2026
18:00 UTC+8

Philippines	1–4	Myanmar
Gayoso 68'	Report	Kyaw Min Oo 7'; Than Paing 28', 83'; Win Naing Tun 81'

New Clark City Athletics Stadium, Capas
Attendance: 3,104
Referee: Jin Jingyuan (China)
28 July 2026
21:00 UTC+8

Malaysia	4–0	Laos
Paulo Josué 45'; Endrick 57'; Viengxay 66' (o.g.); Wan Kuzain 84'	Report

Kuala Lumpur Stadium, Kuala Lumpur
Attendance: 10,044
Referee: Sami Al-Ismail (Saudi Arabia)

1 August 2026
17:00 UTC+7

Laos	1–4	Philippines
Damoth 7'	Report	Lucero 47'; Viengxay 52' (o.g.); Gayoso 60' (pen.); Sato 88'

New Laos National Stadium, Vientiane
Attendance: 1,188
Referee: Kim Hee-gon (South Korea)
1 August 2026
20:00 UTC+7

Thailand	2–0	Malaysia
Yotsakorn 38' (pen.); Teerasak 56'	Report

Rajamangala Stadium, Bangkok
Attendance: 16,037
Referee: Kim Woo-sung (South Korea)

4 August 2026
16:30 UTC+6:30

Myanmar	7–2	Laos
Lwin Moe Aung 2'; Win Naing Tun 20', 41', 83'; Maung Maung Lwin 45+6' (pen.); Than Paing 52'; Hein Htet Aung 81'	Report	Bounchay 17'; Phoutthavong 23'

Thuwunna Stadium, Yangon
Attendance: 11,600
Referee: Alimardon Bainazarov (Kyrgyzstan)
4 August 2026
21:00 UTC+8

Philippines	0–1	Thailand
	Report	Waris 84'

New Clark City Athletics Stadium, Capas
Attendance: 2,786
Referee: Yusuke Ohashi (Japan)

8 August 2026
20:00 UTC+7

Thailand	2–0	Myanmar
Worachit 11' (pen.); Jehhanafee 52' (pen.)	Report

Rajamangala Stadium, Bangkok
Attendance: 13,026
Referee: Yusuke Ohashi (Japan)
8 August 2026
21:00 UTC+8

Malaysia	1–0	Philippines
Pavithran 16'	Report

Kuala Lumpur Stadium, Kuala Lumpur
Attendance: 12,734
Referee: Alimardon Bainazarov (Kyrgyzstan)

== Knockout stage ==
In the knockout stage, if a match was level at the end of normal playing time (in the second leg), extra time was played (two periods of 15 minutes each). If the scores were still level, the match was decided by a penalty shoot-out.

As with every tournament since the 2007 AFF Championship, there was no third place play-off.

All times listed are local

=== Bracket ===
Semi-finals
A2	Singapore	1	2	3
B1	Thailand	3	1	4
B2	Malaysia	0	0	0
A1	Vietnam	2	2	4

Final
B1	Thailand	0	2	2
A1	Vietnam	2	2	4

=== Semi-finals ===
==== Summary ====
Team 1	Agg.	Team 2	1st leg	2nd leg
Singapore	3–4	Thailand	1–3	2–1
Malaysia	0–4	Vietnam	0–2	0–2

==== Matches ====
15 August 2026
21:00 UTC+8

Singapore	1–3	Thailand
Ilhan 84'	Report	Teerasak 13', 26'; Seksan 51'

Jalan Besar Stadium, Kallang
Attendance: 5,358
Referee: Mahmood Al-Majarafi (Oman)
18 August 2026
20:00 UTC+7

Thailand	1–2	Singapore
Kakana 61' (pen.)	Report	H. Stewart 45'; Pansa 65' (o.g.)

Rajamangala Stadium, Bangkok
Attendance: 10,802
Referee: Kim Woo-sung (South Korea)

Thailand won 4–3 on aggregate.

16 August 2026
21:00 UTC+8

Malaysia	0–2	Vietnam
	Report	Nguyễn Xuân Son 45+5'; Faris 86' (o.g.)

Kuala Lumpur Stadium, Kuala Lumpur
Attendance: 10,141
Referee: Rustam Lutfullin (Uzbekistan)
19 August 2026
20:00 UTC+7

Vietnam	2–0	Malaysia
Nguyễn Xuân Son 62', 89'	Report

Mỹ Đình National Stadium, Hanoi
Attendance: 37,906
Referee: Yusuke Ohashi (Japan)

Vietnam won 4–0 on aggregate.

=== Final ===
==== Summary ====
Team 1	Agg.	Team 2	1st leg	2nd leg
Thailand	2–4	Vietnam	0–2	2–2

==== Matches ====
===== First leg =====
22 August 2026
20:00 UTC+7

Thailand	0–2	Vietnam
	Report	Nguyễn Hai Long 62'; Nguyễn Quang Hải 69'

Rajamangala Stadium, Bangkok
Attendance: 26,415
Referee: Sami Al-Ismail (Saudi Arabia)

===== Second leg =====
26 August 2026
20:00 UTC+7

Vietnam	2–2	Thailand
Chatchai 52' (o.g.); Wanchai 90+3' (o.g.)	Report	Yotsakorn 12'; Wanchai 85'

Mỹ Đình National Stadium, Hanoi
Attendance: 38,646
Referee: Ahmed Eisa Darwish (United Arab Emirates)

Vietnam won 4–2 on aggregate.

== Statistics ==
=== Winner ===
2026 ASEAN Championship

Vietnam
Fourth title

=== Goalscorers ===
There were 87 goals scored in 26 matches, for an average of 3.35 goals per match.

5 goals

- (Vietnam national football team) Nguyễn Đình Bắc
- (Vietnam national football team) Nguyễn Xuân Son

4 goals

- (Indonesia national football team) Mitchell Baker
- (Myanmar national football team) Win Naing Tun
- (Singapore national football team) Ilhan Fandi
- (Thailand national football team) Teerasak Poeiphimai

3 goals

- (Malaysia national football team) Paulo Josué
- (Myanmar national football team) Than Paing
- (Thailand national football team) Kakana Khamyok
- (Thailand national football team) Yotsakorn Burapha

2 goals

- (Cambodia national football team) Hav Soknet
- (Philippines national football team) Jarvey Gayoso
- (Vietnam national football team) Đỗ Hoàng Hên
- (Vietnam national football team) Nguyễn Hai Long
- (Vietnam national football team) Nguyễn Quang Hải

1 goal

- (Cambodia national football team) Chea Sokmeng
- (Cambodia national football team) Iago Bento
- (Cambodia national football team) Mon Rado
- (Cambodia national football team) Ouk Sovann
- (Indonesia national football team) Thom Haye
- (Indonesia national football team) Ragnar Oratmangoen
- (Indonesia national football team) Shayne Pattynama
- (Indonesia national football team) Jens Raven
- (Indonesia national football team) Sandy Walsh
- (Laos national football team) Bounchay Chernvanglien
- (Laos national football team) Damoth Thongkhamsavath
- (Laos national football team) Phoutthavong Sangvilay
- (Malaysia national football team) Endrick
- (Malaysia national football team) Pavithran Gunalan
- (Malaysia national football team) Wan Kuzain
- (Myanmar national football team) Hein Htet Aung
- (Myanmar national football team) Kyaw Min Oo
- (Myanmar national football team) Lwin Moe Aung
- (Myanmar national football team) Maung Maung Lwin
- (Myanmar national football team) Myat Kaung Khant
- (Philippines national football team) John Lucero
- (Philippines national football team) Daisuke Sato
- (Singapore national football team) Harhys Stewart
- (Singapore national football team) Shawal Anuar
- (Singapore national football team) Song Ui-young
- (Thailand national football team) Jehhanafee Mamah
- (Thailand national football team) Sarach Yooyen
- (Thailand national football team) Seksan Ratree
- (Thailand national football team) Wanchai Jarunongkran
- (Thailand national football team) Waris Choolthong
- (Thailand national football team) Worachit Kanitsribampen
- (Vietnam national football team) Nguyễn Văn Vĩ

1 own goal

- (Cambodia national football team) Im Vakhim (against Vietnam)
- (Malaysia national football team) Faris Danish (against Vietnam)
- (Thailand national football team) Chatchai Budprom (against Vietnam)
- (Thailand national football team) Pansa Hemviboon (against Singapore)
- (Thailand national football team) Wanchai Jarunongkran (against Vietnam)

2 own goals

- (Laos national football team) Viengxay Sydavong (against Malaysia and Philippines)

=== Discipline ===
A player or team official was automatically suspended for the next match of the tournament for the following offenses:

- Receiving a red card (red card suspensions could be extended for serious offenses).
- Receiving two yellow cards in the tournament. (Note: As yellow cards were not carried forward to penalty shoot-outs, players could be shown two yellow cards in the same match without being sent off. However, this would result in a suspension for accumulating two yellow cards during the tournament.)

The following suspensions were accumulated during the tournament:

Tournament suspensions for players and team officials
Player	Offense(s)	Suspension(s)
(Laos national football team) Phetdavanh Somsanith	(red card) in Group B vs Thailand (25 July)	Group B vs Malaysia (28 July)
(Timor-Leste national football team) Eric Tam Silva	(yellow card) in Group A vs Vietnam (24 July); (yellow card) in Group A vs Singapore (27 July)	Group A vs Indonesia (31 July)
(Cambodia national football team) Yudai Ogawa	(yellow card) in Group A vs Singapore (24 July); (yellow card) in Group A vs Indonesia (27 July)	Group A vs Timor-Leste (3 August)
(Timor-Leste national football team) Jackson Pereira	(yellow card) (yellow-red card) in Group A vs Indonesia (31 July)	Group A vs Cambodia (3 August)
(Singapore national football team) Kyoga Nakamura	(yellow card) in Group A vs Timor-Leste (27 July); (yellow card) in Group A vs Vietnam (31 July)	Group A vs Indonesia (7 August)
(Laos national football team) Phetdavanh Somsanith	(red card) in Group B vs Philippines (1 August)	Group B vs Myanmar (4 August)
(Laos national football team) Kaharn Phetsivilay	(yellow card) in Group B vs Thailand (25 July); (yellow card) in Group B vs Myanmar (4 August)	Suspension served outside the tournament
(Myanmar national football team) Maung Maung Lwin	(red card) in Group B vs Laos (4 August)	Group B vs Thailand (8 August)
(Laos national football team) Sayfon Keohanam	(red card) in Group B vs Myanmar (4 August)	Suspension served outside the tournament
(Singapore national football team) Song Ui-young	(yellow card) in Group A vs Timor-Leste (27 July); (yellow card) in Group A vs Indonesia (7 August)	Semi-finals 1st leg vs Thailand (15 August)
(Indonesia national football team) Ivar Jenner	(yellow card) in Group A vs Vietnam (3 August); (yellow card) in Group A vs Singapore (7 August)	Suspension served outside the tournament

=== Tournament ranking ===
This table shows the ranking of teams throughout the tournament.

Pos	Team	Pld	W	D	L	GF	GA	GD	Pts	Final result
1	Vietnam	8	6	2	0	21	3	+18	20	Champions
2	Thailand	8	5	1	2	16	7	+9	16	Runners-up
3	Singapore	6	3	2	1	8	6	+2	11	Semi-finalists
4	Malaysia	6	3	0	3	7	7	0	9	Semi-finalists
5	Indonesia	4	2	1	1	9	5	+4	7	Eliminated in group stage
6	Myanmar	4	2	0	2	12	7	+5	6	Eliminated in group stage
7	Philippines	4	1	0	3	5	7	−2	3	Eliminated in group stage
8	Cambodia	4	1	0	3	6	10	−4	3	Eliminated in group stage
9	Timor-Leste	4	0	0	4	0	15	−15	0	Eliminated in group stage
10	Laos	4	0	0	4	3	20	−17	0	Eliminated in group stage

Source: ASEAN United

=== Awards ===
Best goalkeeper	Best player	Best young player	Top scorer
(Vietnam) Lê Giang Patrik	(Vietnam) Nguyễn Đình Bắc	(Thailand) Yotsakorn Burapha	(Vietnam) Nguyễn Đình Bắc (Vietnam) Nguyễn Xuân Son

== Marketing ==
=== Official match ball ===
The tournament's official match ball, the Adidas Tiro 26, was unveiled on 23 January.

=== Sponsorship ===
Title partner	Presenting partners	Official sponsors	Official supporters	Official performance/shaving partner
Hyundai Motor Company	Mitsui Sumitomo Insurance Group; Shopee	ALL - Accor Live Limitless; Acecook; Aussie Beef & Lamb; Daikin; Liqui Moly; VietJet Air; Yanmar	Giti Tire; Helm AG	Adidas; Procter & Gamble (Gillette)

== Media coverage ==
For the first time, Malaysia failed to secure domestic broadcasting rights due to the Malaysian football naturalisation scandal and match boycotts. All matches were streamed live on the ASEAN United YouTube channel.

2026 ASEAN Championship television broadcasters in Southeast Asia
Country	Broadcasting networks	Television	Radio	Live streaming
Brunei	Bayon Television, RTB	RTB Aneka	—N/a	Platforms: RTBGo
Cambodia	Bayon Television	BTV Cambodia	—N/a	
Indonesia	MNC Media	RCTI, GTV, iNews, Sportstars, Zona Juara	MNC Trijaya FM	Platforms: Vision+
Laos	Bayon Television	—N/a		
Malaysia				
Myanmar	Sky Net	Sports 3	—N/a	
Philippines	Cignal	One Sports, One Sports+	—N/a	Platforms: Pilipinas Live
Singapore	Mediacorp	CH5	—N/a	meWATCH
Thailand	TrueVisions	True Sports 2, True Ball Thai 1 Channel	—N/a	True Visions Now
Timor-Leste	Bayon Television	—N/a		
Vietnam	FPT Play, Viettel, VTV	VTV2, VTV6, VTV7, VTV10	—N/a	Platforms: FPT Play, VTVgo, TV360, VNPT, MyTV, SCTV, VTVcab
2026 ASEAN Championship international television broadcasters
China	Quijing	—N/a		Douyin
South Korea	Eclat Media	SPOTV	—N/a	SPOTV Now
France, Germany, United Kingdom, United States	OneFootball	—N/a		OneFootball
Rest of the world	YouTube, OneFootball	—N/a		

== See also ==
- 2026 WAFF Championship
- 2026 SAFF Championship
- 2026 FIFA ASEAN Cup
