= 2024 ASEAN Championship Group B =

Group B was one of the two groups of competing nations at the 2024 ASEAN Championship. It consisted of Vietnam, Indonesia, the Philippines, Myanmar, and Laos. The matches were played from 9 to 21 December 2024.

Vietnam and the Philippines advanced to the semi-finals as the top two teams in the group. Vietnam topped the group with three victories and a draw. The Philippines would advance as runners-up, with two wins and two draws. Indonesia and Myanmar finished third and fourth with one win and a draw each, while Laos finished fifth with just two points.

== Teams ==
Draw position	Team	Appearance	Previous best performance	FIFA Ranking	
Draw position	Team	Appearance	Previous best performance	April 2024	November 2024
B1	Vietnam	15th	Winners (2008, 2018)	115	116
B2	Indonesia	15th	Runners-up (2000, 2002, 2004, 2010, 2016, 2020)	134	125
B3	Philippines	14th	Semi-finalists (2010, 2012, 2014, 2018)	141	149
B4	Myanmar	15th	Fourth place / Semi-finalists (2004, 2016)	163	167
B5	Laos	14th	Group stage (All appearances)	190	186

== Standings ==
Pos	Team	Pld	W	D	L	GF	GA	GD	Pts	Qualification
1	Vietnam	4	3	1	0	11	2	+9	10	Advance to knockout stage
2	Philippines	4	1	3	0	4	3	+1	6	Advance to knockout stage
3	Indonesia	4	1	1	2	4	5	−1	4	
4	Myanmar	4	1	1	2	4	9	−5	4	
5	Laos	4	0	2	2	7	11	−4	2	

Source: ASEAN United FC

== Matches ==
=== Myanmar vs Indonesia ===
9 December 2024
19:00 UTC+6:30

Myanmar	0–1	Indonesia
	Report	Zin Nyi Nyi Aung 76' (o.g.)

Thuwunna Stadium, Yangon
Attendance: 12,500
Referee: Wong Wai Lun (Hong Kong)

Myanmar	Indonesia

GK	23	Zin Nyi Nyi Aung
RB	2	Hein Phyo Win	(yellow card) 45+5'
CB	3	Thet Hein Soe
CB	17	Thiha Htet Aung		(substituted off) 75'
LB	5	Nanda Kyaw		(substituted off) 85'
DM	14	Wai Lin Aung	(yellow card) 35'	(substituted off) 85'
RM	11	Maung Maung Lwin (c)	(yellow card) 11'
CM	7	Lwin Moe Aung
CM	22	Zaw Win Thein
LM	10	Thiha Zaw
CF	16	Aung Kaung Mann		(substituted off) 54'
Substitutions:
FW	21	Ye Yint Aung		(substituted on) 54'
DF	24	Latt Wai Phone		(substituted on) 75'
FW	19	Oakkar Naing		(substituted on) 85'
MF	13	Aung Naing Win		(substituted on) 85'
Manager:
Myo Hlaing Win

GK	1	Cahya Supriadi
RB	2	Alfriyanto Nico	(substituted off) 46'
CB	13	Muhammad Ferarri (c)
CB	4	Kadek Arel
LB	12	Pratama Arhan
CM	17	Zanadin Fariz	(substituted off) 46'
CM	8	Arkhan Fikri
RW	9	Hokky Caraka	(substituted off) 73'
AM	7	Marselino Ferdinan	(substituted off) 88'
LW	16	Dony Tri Pamungkas
CF	20	Arkhan Kaka	(substituted off) 46'
Substitutions:
FW	10	Rafael Struick	(substituted on) 46'
FW	18	Victor Dethan	(substituted on) 46'
DF	14	Asnawi Mangkualam	(substituted on) 46'
MF	24	Robi Darwis	(substituted on) 73'
FW	11	Ronaldo Kwateh	(substituted on) 88'
Manager:
(South Korea) Shin Tae-yong

Assistant referees:
So Kai Man (Hong Kong)
Nai Kei Sam Lam (Hong Kong)
Fourth official:
Muhammad Usaid Jamal (Malaysia)

Overall
Statistics	Myanmar	Indonesia
Goals scored	0	1
Total shots	12	17
Shots on target	3	4
Ball possession	42%	57%
Corner kicks	3	10
Fouls committed	9	11
Offsides	0	0
Yellow cards	3	0
Red cards	0	0

=== Laos vs Vietnam ===
9 December 2024
20:00 UTC+7

Laos	1–4	Vietnam
Bounphachan 90+5' (pen.)	Report	Nguyễn Hai Long 58'; Nguyễn Tiến Linh 63'; Nguyễn Văn Toàn 69'; Nguyễn Văn Vĩ 82'

New Laos National Stadium, Vientiane
Attendance: 10,685
Referee: Ko Hyung-jin (South Korea)

Laos	Vietnam

GK	12	Xaysavath Souvanhnasok
RB	20	Sengdaovy Hanthavong
CB	4	Anantaza Siphongphan
CB	5	Phetdavanh Somsanith	(yellow card) 55'
LB	3	Phoutthavong Sangvilay
DM	6	Chanthavixay Khounthoumphone		(substituted off) 72'
CM	16	Damoth Thongkhamsavath		(substituted off) 80'
CM	17	Bounphachan Bounkong (c)
RF	9	Kydavone Souvanny		(substituted off) 88'
CF	11	Soukphachan Lueanthala
LF	14	Chony Waenpaseuth		(substituted off) 46'
Substitutions:
FW	10	Phathana Phommathep		(substituted on) 46'	(substituted off) 72'
MF	7	Anousone Xaypanya	(yellow card) 84'	(substituted on) 72'
FW	23	Peter Phanthavong		(substituted on) 72'
MF	8	Phoutthasay Khochalern		(substituted on) 80'
MF	19	Phousomboun Panyavong		(substituted on) 88'
Manager:
(South Korea) Ha Hyeok-jun

GK	21	Nguyễn Đình Triệu
CB	2	Đỗ Duy Mạnh (c)
CB	16	Nguyễn Thành Chung
CB	4	Bùi Tiến Dũng
RM	5	Trương Tiến Anh	(substituted off) 86'
CM	24	Nguyễn Hai Long	(substituted off) 60'
CM	25	Doãn Ngọc Tân	(substituted off) 60'
CM	14	Nguyễn Hoàng Đức
LM	26	Khuất Văn Khang	(substituted off) 46'
SS	15	Bùi Vĩ Hào	(substituted off) 60'
CF	22	Nguyễn Tiến Linh
Substitutions:
DF	3	Nguyễn Văn Vĩ	(substituted on) 46'
FW	10	Phạm Tuấn Hải	(substituted on) 60'
MF	19	Nguyễn Quang Hải	(substituted on) 60'
FW	9	Nguyễn Văn Toàn	(substituted on) 60'
DF	13	Hồ Tấn Tài	(substituted on) 86'
Manager:
(South Korea) Kim Sang-sik

Assistant referees:
Kwak Seung-soon (South Korea)
Mohd Yusri Muhammad (Malaysia)
Fourth official:
Mohd Kamil Zakaria Ismail (Malaysia)
Video assistant referee:
Choi Hyun-jai (South Korea)
Assistant video assistant referees:
Sivakorn Pu-udom (Thailand)
Du Jianxin (China)

Overall
Statistics	Laos	Vietnam
Goals scored	1	4
Total shots	7	21
Shots on target	3	11
Ball possession	26%	73%
Corner kicks	1	7
Fouls committed	8	8
Offsides	0	2
Yellow cards	2	0
Red cards	0	0

=== Philippines vs Myanmar ===
12 December 2024
18:30 UTC+8

Philippines	1–1	Myanmar
Kristensen 72' (pen.)	Report	Maung Maung Lwin 25'

Rizal Memorial Stadium, Manila
Attendance: 1,589
Referee: Kim Dae-yong (South Korea)

Philippines	Myanmar

GK	1	Patrick Deyto
RB	3	Paul Tabinas
CB	23	Christian Rontini (c)	(substituted off) 77'
CB	4	Kike Linares
LB	20	Michael Kempter
CM	17	Zico Bailey
CM	19	Oskari Kekkonen	(substituted off) 62'
RW	13	Alex Monis	(substituted off) 77'
AM	6	Sandro Reyes	(substituted off) 87'
LW	9	Jarvey Gayoso	(substituted off) 62'
CF	10	Bjørn Martin Kristensen
Substitutions:
MF	8	Michael Baldisimo	(substituted on) 62'
MF	24	Javier Mariona	(substituted on) 62'
DF	12	Amani Aguinaldo	(substituted on) 77'
FW	7	Pocholo Bugas	(substituted on) 77'
FW	18	Patrick Reichelt	(substituted on) 87'
Manager:
(Spain) Albert Capellas

GK	23	Zin Nyi Nyi Aung	(yellow card) 71'
RB	2	Hein Phyo Win
CB	3	Thet Hein Soe
CB	17	Thiha Htet Aung	(yellow card) 13'
LB	5	Nanda Kyaw		(substituted off) 55'
DM	14	Wai Lin Aung	(yellow card) 36'	(substituted off) 56'
RM	11	Maung Maung Lwin		(substituted off) 90+1'
CM	7	Lwin Moe Aung
CM	22	Zaw Win Thein		(substituted off) 75'
LM	10	Thiha Zaw (c)
CF	16	Aung Kaung Mann		(substituted off) 46'
Substitutions:
FW	21	Ye Yint Aung		(substituted on) 46'
FW	19	Oakkar Naing		(substituted on) 55'
MF	13	Aung Naing Win		(substituted on) 56'
MF	8	Myat Kaung Khant		(substituted on) 75'
DF	25	Aung Wunna Soe		(substituted on) 90+1'
Manager:
Myo Hlaing Win

Assistant referees:
Kang Dong-ho (South Korea)
Abdul Hannan Abdul Hasim (Singapore)
Fourth official:
Pansa Chaisanit (Thailand)
Video assistant referee:
Muhammad Taqi (Singapore)
Assistant video assistant referees:
Du Jianxin (China)
Choi Hyun-jai (South Korea)

Overall
Statistics	Philippines	Myanmar
Goals scored	1	1
Total shots	23	8
Shots on target	8	4
Ball possession	61%	38%
Corner kicks	8	1
Fouls committed	9	16
Offsides	1	3
Yellow cards	0	3
Red cards	0	0

=== Indonesia vs Laos ===
12 December 2024
20:00 UTC+7

Indonesia	3–3	Laos
Kadek 12'; Ferarri 18', 72'	Report	Phousomboun 9'; Phathana 13'; Peter 77'

Manahan Stadium, Surakarta
Attendance: 14,455
Referee: Hiroki Kasahara (Japan)

Indonesia	Laos

GK	22	Daffa Fasya
RB	9	Hokky Caraka		(substituted off) 46'
CB	5	Kakang Rudianto		(substituted off) 46'
CB	4	Kadek Arel
LB	12	Pratama Arhan		(substituted off) 81'
DM	13	Muhammad Ferarri (c)
RM	15	Rayhan Hannan		(substituted off) 46'
CM	8	Arkhan Fikri		(substituted off) 81'
LM	7	Marselino Ferdinan	(yellow card) 40' (yellow-red card) 69'
SS	16	Dony Tri Pamungkas
CF	10	Rafael Struick
Substitutions:
MF	17	Zanadin Fariz		(substituted on) 46'
DF	14	Asnawi Mangkualam		(substituted on) 46'
FW	18	Victor Dethan		(substituted on) 46'
FW	11	Ronaldo Kwateh		(substituted on) 81'
MF	24	Robi Darwis	(yellow card) 88'	(substituted on) 81'
Manager:
(South Korea) Shin Tae-yong

GK	12	Keo-Oudone Souvannasangso
CB	4	Anantaza Siphongphan
CB	25	Sonevilay Phetviengsy		(substituted off) 46'
CB	5	Phetdavanh Somsanith
RM	21	Phoutthalak Thongsanith		(substituted off) 67'
CM	8	Phoutthasay Khochalern		(substituted off) 49'
CM	19	Phousomboun Panyavong
LM	17	Bounphachan Bounkong (c)		(substituted off) 74'
AM	7	Anousone Xaypanya
CF	13	Xayasith Singsavang		(substituted off) 46'
CF	10	Phathana Phommathep	(yellow card) 28'
Substitutions:
DF	20	Sengdaovy Hanthavong	(yellow card) 90+1'	(substituted on) 46'
DF	3	Phoutthavong Sangvilay	(yellow card) 65'	(substituted on) 46'
MF	16	Damoth Thongkhamsavath		(substituted on) 49'
FW	11	Soukphachan Lueanthala		(substituted on) 67'
FW	23	Peter Phanthavong		(substituted on) 74'
Manager:
(South Korea) Ha Hyeok-jun

Assistant referees:
Yosuke Takebe (Japan)
Apichit Nophuan (Thailand)
Fourth official:
Warintorn Sassadee (Thailand)
Video assistant referee:
Muhammad Taqi (Singapore)
Assistant video assistant referees:
Mamdouh Al Shahdan Mufareh (Saudi Arabia)

Overall
Statistics	Indonesia	Laos
Goals scored	3	3
Total shots	24	12
Shots on target	9	3
Ball possession	66%	33%
Corner kicks	9	5
Fouls committed	12	12
Offsides	0	1
Yellow cards	2	3
Red cards	1	0

=== Laos vs Philippines ===
15 December 2024
17:30 UTC+7

Laos	1–1	Philippines
Baldisimo 34' (o.g.)	Report	Reyes 77'

New Laos National Stadium, Vientiane
Attendance: 6,389
Referee: Ryo Tanimoto (Japan)

Laos	Philippines

GK	1	Kop Lokphathip		(substituted off) 54'
RB	20	Sengdaovy Hanthavong
CB	4	Anantaza Siphongphan
CB	5	Phetdavanh Somsanith (c)
LB	3	Phoutthavong Sangvilay
CM	9	Kydavone Souvanny	(yellow card) 70'	(substituted off) 82'
CM	16	Damoth Thongkhamsavath
CM	22	Souphan Khambaion		(substituted off) 36'
AM	15	Phoutdavy Phommasane		(substituted off) 46'
CF	24	Sisawad Dalavong		(substituted off) 46'
CF	11	Soukphachan Lueanthala	(yellow card) 90+4'
Substitutions:
FW	10	Phathana Phommathep	(yellow card) 87'	(substituted on) 36'
MF	7	Anousone Xaypanya		(substituted on) 46'
MF	19	Phousomboun Panyavong		(substituted on) 46'
GK	18	Xaysavath Souvanhnasok		(substituted on) 54'
FW	23	Peter Phanthavong		(substituted on) 82'
Manager:
(South Korea) Ha Hyeok-jun

GK	1	Patrick Deyto
RB	3	Paul Tabinas
CB	12	Amani Aguinaldo (c)
CB	4	Kike Linares	(substituted off) 62'
LB	8	Michael Baldisimo	(substituted off) 61'
CM	17	Zico Bailey
CM	19	Oskari Kekkonen	(substituted off) 81'
RW	13	Alex Monis	(substituted off) 82'
AM	6	Sandro Reyes
LW	20	Michael Kempter	(substituted off) 62'
CF	10	Bjørn Martin Kristensen
Substitutions:
MF	24	Javier Mariona	(substituted on) 61'
DF	5	Scott Woods	(substituted on) 62'
DF	23	Christian Rontini	(substituted on) 62'
FW	7	Pocholo Bugas	(substituted on) 81'
FW	18	Patrick Reichelt	(substituted on) 82'
Manager:
(Spain) Albert Capellas

Assistant referees:
Isao Nishihashi (Japan)
Kota Watanabe (Japan)
Fourth official:
Tuan Mohd Yaasin (Malaysia)
Video assistant referee:
Choi Hyun-jai (South Korea)
Assistant video assistant referees:
Sivakorn Pu-udom (Thailand)
Du Jianxin (China)

Overall
Statistics	Laos	Philippines
Goals scored	1	1
Total shots	13	14
Shots on target	2	5
Ball possession	24%	75%
Corner kicks	5	6
Fouls committed	15	15
Offsides	0	2
Yellow cards	3	0
Red cards	0	0

=== Vietnam vs Indonesia ===
15 December 2024
20:00 UTC+7

Vietnam	1–0	Indonesia
Nguyễn Quang Hải 77'	Report

Việt Trì Stadium, Việt Trì
Attendance: 16,669
Referee: Abdullah Dhafer Al-Shehri (Saudi Arabia)

Vietnam	Indonesia

GK	1	Filip Nguyen
RB	13	Hồ Tấn Tài		(substituted off) 75'
CB	16	Nguyễn Thành Chung	(yellow card) 45+3'
CB	4	Bùi Tiến Dũng
LB	7	Phạm Xuân Mạnh
CM	24	Nguyễn Hai Long
CM	25	Doãn Ngọc Tân		(substituted off) 61'
CM	14	Nguyễn Hoàng Đức
RF	19	Nguyễn Quang Hải (c)
CF	22	Nguyễn Tiến Linh		(substituted off) 90+3'
LF	3	Nguyễn Văn Vĩ		(substituted off) 75'
Substitutions:
FW	9	Nguyễn Văn Toàn		(substituted on) 61'
MF	26	Khuất Văn Khang		(substituted on) 75'
DF	17	Vũ Văn Thanh		(substituted on) 75'
FW	15	Bùi Vĩ Hào		(substituted on) 90+3'
Manager:
(South Korea) Kim Sang-sik

GK	1	Cahya Supriadi
RB	19	Achmad Maulana
CB	13	Muhammad Ferarri (c)
CB	4	Kadek Arel
LB	25	Mikael Tata		(substituted off) 46'
CM	21	Rivaldo Pakpahan		(substituted off) 40'
CM	8	Arkhan Fikri
RW	14	Asnawi Mangkualam
AM	15	Rayhan Hannan		(substituted off) 80'
LW	16	Dony Tri Pamungkas		(substituted off) 88'
CF	9	Hokky Caraka	(yellow card) 29'	(substituted off) 46'
Substitutions:
FW	10	Rafael Struick		(substituted on) 40'
FW	18	Victor Dethan		(substituted on) 46'
DF	12	Pratama Arhan		(substituted on) 46'
FW	11	Ronaldo Kwateh		(substituted on) 80'
MF	24	Robi Darwis		(substituted on) 88'
Manager:
(South Korea) Shin Tae-yong

Assistant referees:
Ibrahim Abdullah Al Dakheel (Saudi Arabia)
Saad Saud Al Subaie (Saudi Arabia)
Fourth official:
Songkran Bunmeekiart (Thailand)
Video assistant referee:
Mamdouh Al Shahdan Mufareh (Saudi Arabia)
Assistant video assistant referees:
Muhammad Taqi (Singapore)

Overall
Statistics	Vietnam	Indonesia
Goals scored	1	0
Total shots	18	2
Shots on target	4	1
Ball possession	71%	28%
Corner kicks	7	2
Fouls committed	12	16
Offsides	1	0
Yellow cards	1	1
Red cards	0	0

=== Myanmar vs Laos ===
18 December 2024
17:00 UTC+6:30

Myanmar	3–2	Laos
Lwin Moe Aung 32'; Win Naing Tun 87', 90+3'	Report	Kydavone 77'; Chony 81'

Thuwunna Stadium, Yangon
Attendance: 8,150
Referee: Hiroyuki Kimura (Japan)

Myanmar	Laos

GK	23	Zin Nyi Nyi Aung
RB	2	Hein Phyo Win
CB	3	Thet Hein Soe		(substituted off) 24'
CB	17	Thiha Htet Aung		(substituted off) 87'
LB	5	Nanda Kyaw		(substituted off) 87'
DM	4	Soe Moe Kyaw
RM	11	Maung Maung Lwin	(yellow card) 57'
CM	7	Lwin Moe Aung
CM	22	Zaw Win Thein
LM	10	Thiha Zaw (c)		(substituted off) 59'
CF	16	Aung Kaung Mann		(substituted off) 24'
Substitutions:
FW	19	Oakkar Naing		(substituted on) 24'
FW	9	Win Naing Tun		(substituted on) 24'
FW	21	Ye Yint Aung		(substituted on) 59'
MF	13	Aung Naing Win		(substituted on) 87'
DF	24	Latt Wai Phone		(substituted on) 87'
Manager:
Myo Hlaing Win

GK	12	Xaysavath Souvanhnasok	(yellow card) 89'
RB	20	Sengdaovy Hanthavong
CB	4	Anantaza Siphongphan
CB	5	Phetdavanh Somsanith (c)
LB	6	Chanthavixay Khounthoumphone		(substituted off) 78'
CM	16	Damoth Thongkhamsavath
CM	19	Phousomboun Panyavong		(substituted off) 40'
RW	13	Xayasith Singsavang		(substituted off) 60'
AM	7	Anousone Xaypanya		(substituted off) 61'
LW	23	Peter Phanthavong
CF	11	Soukphachan Lueanthala
Substitutions:
FW	9	Kydavone Souvanny		(substituted on) 40'
DF	26	Phonsak Seesavath		(substituted on) 60'
FW	14	Chony Waenpaseuth		(substituted on) 61'
MF	8	Phoutthasay Khochalern		(substituted on) 78'
Manager:
(South Korea) Ha Hyeok-jun

Assistant referees:
Jun Mihara (Japan)
Takumi Takagi (Japan)
Fourth official:
Muhammad Usaid Jamal (Malaysia)

Overall
Statistics	Myanmar	Laos
Goals scored	3	2
Total shots	32	9
Shots on target	9	5
Ball possession	60%	39%
Corner kicks	5	3
Fouls committed	14	8
Offsides	1	0
Yellow cards	1	1
Red cards	0	0

=== Philippines vs Vietnam ===
18 December 2024
21:00 UTC+8

Philippines	1–1	Vietnam
Gayoso 68'	Report	Doãn Ngọc Tân 90+7'

Rizal Memorial Stadium, Manila
Attendance: 3,346
Referee: Akobirkhuja Shukrullaev (Uzbekistan)

Philippines	Vietnam

GK	1	Patrick Deyto
RB	3	Paul Tabinas
CB	4	Kike Linares	(yellow card) 3'	(substituted off) 28'
CB	2	Adrian Ugelvik
LB	20	Michael Kempter (c)		(substituted off) 65'
CM	17	Zico Bailey
CM	8	Michael Baldisimo		(substituted off) 46'
RW	13	Alex Monis
AM	6	Sandro Reyes
LW	24	Javier Mariona		(substituted off) 86'
CF	10	Bjørn Martin Kristensen		(substituted off) 66'
Substitutions:
DF	12	Amani Aguinaldo	(yellow card) 90+10'	(substituted on) 28'
MF	19	Oskari Kekkonen	(yellow card) 60'	(substituted on) 46'
DF	5	Scott Woods		(substituted on) 65'
FW	9	Jarvey Gayoso		(substituted on) 66'
FW	14	Dov Cariño		(substituted on) 86'
Manager:
(Spain) Albert Capellas

GK	1	Filip Nguyen
CB	2	Đỗ Duy Mạnh (c)
CB	20	Bùi Hoàng Việt Anh
CB	6	Nguyễn Thanh Bình		(substituted off) 76'
RM	17	Vũ Văn Thanh
CM	19	Nguyễn Quang Hải		(substituted off) 46'
CM	25	Doãn Ngọc Tân
CM	8	Châu Ngọc Quang		(substituted off) 63'
LM	26	Khuất Văn Khang		(substituted off) 75'
SS	15	Bùi Vĩ Hào
CF	18	Đinh Thanh Bình	(yellow card) 77'	(substituted off) 82'
Substitutions:
MF	14	Nguyễn Hoàng Đức		(substituted on) 46'
FW	9	Nguyễn Văn Toàn		(substituted on) 63'
DF	3	Nguyễn Văn Vĩ		(substituted on) 75'
FW	22	Nguyễn Tiến Linh		(substituted on) 76'
FW	10	Phạm Tuấn Hải		(substituted on) 82'
Manager:
(South Korea) Kim Sang-sik

Assistant referees:
Andrey Tsapenko (Uzbekistan)
Timur Gaynulin (Uzbekistan)
Fourth official:
Mongkolchai Pechsri (Thailand)

Overall
Statistics	Philippines	Vietnam
Goals scored	1	1
Total shots	7	15
Shots on target	1	4
Ball possession	50%	49%
Corner kicks	3	11
Fouls committed	13	15
Offsides	1	0
Yellow cards	3	1
Red cards	0	0

=== Vietnam vs Myanmar ===
21 December 2024
20:00 UTC+7

Vietnam	5–0	Myanmar
Bùi Vĩ Hào 48'; Nguyễn Xuân Son 55', 90'; Nguyễn Quang Hải 74'; Nguyễn Tiến Linh 90+2'	Report

Việt Trì Stadium, Việt Trì
Attendance: 16,869
Referee: Koki Nagamine (Japan)

Vietnam	Myanmar

GK	21	Nguyễn Đình Triệu
RB	7	Phạm Xuân Mạnh
CB	16	Nguyễn Thành Chung	(substituted off) 90+8'
CB	4	Bùi Tiến Dũng
LB	3	Nguyễn Văn Vĩ	(substituted off) 61'
RM	5	Trương Tiến Anh
CM	19	Nguyễn Quang Hải (c)
CM	14	Nguyễn Hoàng Đức	(substituted off) 74'
LM	15	Bùi Vĩ Hào	(substituted off) 90+7'
SS	9	Nguyễn Văn Toàn	(substituted off) 62'
CF	12	Nguyễn Xuân Son
Substitutions:
DF	13	Hồ Tấn Tài	(substituted on) 61'
FW	22	Nguyễn Tiến Linh	(substituted on) 62'
MF	11	Lê Phạm Thành Long	(substituted on) 74'
DF	2	Đỗ Duy Mạnh	(substituted on) 90+8'
FW	10	Phạm Tuấn Hải	(substituted on) 90+7'
Manager:
(South Korea) Kim Sang-sik

GK	18	Pyae Phyo Thu
RB	2	Hein Phyo Win	(yellow card) 40'
CB	4	Soe Moe Kyaw	(yellow card) 37'
CB	17	Thiha Htet Aung		(substituted off) 46'
LB	24	Latt Wai Phone		(substituted off) 66'
DM	14	Wai Lin Aung		(substituted off) 86'
RM	19	Oakkar Naing
CM	21	Ye Yint Aung		(substituted off) 72'
LM	10	Thiha Zaw (c)		(substituted off) 86'
AM	7	Lwin Moe Aung
CF	9	Win Naing Tun
Substitutions:
DF	3	Thet Hein Soe		(substituted on) 46'
FW	16	Aung Kaung Mann		(substituted on) 66'
MF	22	Zaw Win Thein		(substituted on) 72'
DF	25	Aung Wunna Soe		(substituted on) 86'
MF	13	Aung Naing Win		(substituted on) 86'
Manager:
Myo Hlaing Win

Assistant referees:
Takeshi Asada (Japan)
Yosuke Takebe (Japan)
Fourth official:
Wiwat Jumpao-on (Thailand)

Overall
Statistics	Vietnam	Myanmar
Goals scored	5	0
Total shots	26	10
Shots on target	9	3
Ball possession	50%	49%
Corner kicks	7	0
Fouls committed	4	9
Offsides	3	1
Yellow cards	0	2
Red cards	0	0

=== Indonesia vs Philippines ===
21 December 2024
20:00 UTC+7

Indonesia	0–1	Philippines
	Report	Kristensen 63' (pen.)

Manahan Stadium, Surakarta
Attendance: 17,390
Referee: Koji Takasaki (Japan)

Indonesia	Philippines

GK	1	Cahya Supriadi
RB	19	Achmad Maulana		(substituted off) 79'
CB	13	Muhammad Ferarri (c)	(red card) 42'
CB	4	Kadek Arel
LB	12	Pratama Arhan
RM	14	Asnawi Mangkualam	(yellow card) 19'
CM	8	Arkhan Fikri
LM	16	Dony Tri Pamungkas
AM	15	Rayhan Hannan		(substituted off) 90+4'
AM	7	Marselino Ferdinan		(substituted off) 79'
CF	10	Rafael Struick		(substituted off) 52'
Substitutions:
FW	9	Hokky Caraka		(substituted on) 52'	(substituted off) 90+5'
FW	18	Victor Dethan		(substituted on) 79'
FW	20	Arkhan Kaka		(substituted on) 79'
FW	11	Ronaldo Kwateh		(substituted on) 90+4'
MF	24	Robi Darwis		(substituted on) 90+5'
Manager:
(South Korea) Shin Tae-yong

GK	1	Patrick Deyto		(substituted off) 9'
CB	17	Zico Bailey
CB	12	Amani Aguinaldo (c)	(yellow card) 42'
CB	5	Scott Woods		(substituted off) 70'
DM	2	Adrian Ugelvik	(yellow card) 33'
RM	3	Paul Tabinas	(yellow card) 25'
LM	24	Javier Mariona		(substituted off) 46'
AM	6	Sandro Reyes
RF	13	Alex Monis
CF	10	Bjørn Martin Kristensen		(substituted off) 69'
LF	20	Michael Kempter
Substitutions:
GK	16	Quincy Kammeraad	(yellow card) 90+10'	(substituted on) 9'
FW	11	Uriel Dalapo	(yellow card) 47'	(substituted on) 46'	(substituted off) 90+4'
FW	9	Jarvey Gayoso	(yellow card) 90+11'	(substituted on) 69'
DF	23	Christian Rontini	(yellow card) 90+11'	(substituted on) 70'
FW	18	Patrick Reichelt		(substituted on) 90+4'
Manager:
(Spain) Albert Capellas

Assistant referees:
Yusuke Hamamoto (Japan)
Tomoyuki Umeda (Japan)
Fourth official:
Jansen Foo Chuan Hui (Singapore)
Video assistant referee:
Mamdouh Al Shahdan Mufareh (Saudi Arabia)
Assistant video assistant referees:
Mohammed Khaled Al Hoaish (Saudi Arabia)

Overall
Statistics	Indonesia	Philippines
Goals scored	0	1
Total shots	19	9
Shots on target	6	6
Ball possession	54%	45%
Corner kicks	5	1
Fouls committed	13	17
Offsides	0	1
Yellow cards	1	7
Red cards	1	0
