= 2024 ASEAN Championship squads =

Association football competition squads

Below are the squads for the 2024 ASEAN Championship, which took place between 8 December 2024 and 5 January 2025.

Ten national teams affiliated with ASEAN Football Federation (AFF) and participating in this tournament were required to register a squad containing up to 26 players, including three goalkeepers. Only the players from the following squad list were allowed to appear in this tournament. Since the 2022 AFF Championship, each player shirt number was compulsory to use from 1 to 26, which followed the standard of the Asian Football Confederation (AFC).

The age listed is the age of each player on 8 December 2024, the first day of the tournament. The number of appearances and goals listed for each player does not include the match played after the start of the 2024 ASEAN Championship. The club listed is the last club where the player concerned plays a competitive match before the tournament. Fold flag for each club according to the State Football Association (not league) the club is affiliated.

In the event that a player on the submitted squad list suffered from an injury or illness prior to his team's first match of the tournament, that player could be replaced, provided that the team doctor and a doctor from the AFF both confirmed that the injury or illness was severe enough to prevent the player from participating in the tournament. Should a goalkeeper have suffered from an injury or illness after his team's first match of the tournament, he could still be replaced, even if the other goalkeepers from the squad were still available. A player who had been replaced on the player list could not be readmitted to the list.

== Group A ==
=== Cambodia ===
Cambodia announced their final squad on 1 December 2024.

Head coach: (Japan) Koji Gyotoku

No.	Pos.	Player	Date of birth (age)	Caps	Goals	Club
1	GK	Hul Kimhuy	7 April 2000 (aged 24)	19	0	(Football Federation of Cambodia) Visakha
2	MF	Hikaru Mizuno	2 August 1991 (aged 33)	4	0	(Football Federation of Cambodia) Preah Khan Reach Svay Rieng
3	DF	Taing Bunchhai	28 December 2002 (aged 21)	3	0	(Football Federation of Cambodia) Boeung Ket Angkor
4	DF	Kan Mo (captain)	24 September 1992 (aged 32)	4	0	(Football Federation of Cambodia) Visakha
5	DF	Soeuy Visal	19 August 1995 (aged 29)	81	5	(Football Federation of Cambodia) Preah Khan Reach Svay Rieng
6	MF	Yudai Ogawa	4 October 1996 (aged 28)	11	1	(Football Federation of Cambodia) Phnom Penh Crown
7	FW	Lim Pisoth	29 August 2001 (aged 23)	25	2	(Football Federation of Cambodia) Phnom Penh Crown
8	MF	Orn Chanpolin	15 March 1998 (aged 26)	41	1	(Football Federation of Cambodia) Phnom Penh Crown
9	FW	Sieng Chanthea	9 September 2002 (aged 22)	36	7	(Football Federation of Cambodia) Boeung Ket Angkor
10	MF	Andrés Nieto	29 April 1996 (aged 28)	0	0	(Football Federation of Cambodia) Phnom Penh Crown
11	MF	Nick Taylor	2 September 1998 (aged 26)	16	1	(Football Federation of Cambodia) Preah Khan Reach Svay Rieng
12	MF	In Sodavid	2 July 1998 (aged 26)	17	0	(Football Federation of Cambodia) Visakha
13	DF	Sareth Krya	3 March 1996 (aged 28)	33	1	(Football Federation of Cambodia) Preah Khan Reach Svay Rieng
14	FW	Hav Soknet	3 August 2003 (aged 21)	0	0	(Football Federation of Cambodia) ISI Dangkor Senchey
15	DF	Takaki Ose	19 October 1995 (aged 29)	0	0	(Football Federation of Cambodia) Phnom Penh Crown
16	MF	Yeu Muslim	25 December 1998 (aged 25)	20	0	(Football Federation of Cambodia) Phnom Penh Crown
17	FW	Sa Ty	4 April 2002 (aged 22)	16	1	(Football Federation of Cambodia) Visakha
18	DF	Seut Baraing	29 September 1999 (aged 25)	13	0	(Football Federation of Cambodia) Phnom Penh Crown
19	MF	Kim Sokyuth	21 June 1999 (aged 25)	7	0	(Football Federation of Cambodia) Preah Khan Reach Svay Rieng
20	FW	Abdel Kader	18 June 1993 (aged 31)	0	0	(Football Federation of Cambodia) ISI Dangkor Senchey
21	GK	Vireak Dara	30 October 2003 (aged 21)	4	0	(Football Federation of Cambodia) Preah Khan Reach Svay Rieng
22	GK	Reth Lyheng	1 January 2004 (aged 20)	0	0	(Football Federation of Cambodia) Nagaworld
23	FW	Sor Rotana	9 October 2002 (aged 22)	10	0	(Football Federation of Cambodia) Visakha
24	DF	Leng Nora	19 September 2004 (aged 20)	3	0	(Football Federation of Cambodia) Visakha
25	MF	Sin Kakada	29 July 2000 (aged 24)	9	0	(Football Federation of Cambodia) Visakha
26	MF	Min Ratanak	30 July 2002 (aged 22)	9	2	(Football Federation of Cambodia) Preah Khan Reach Svay Rieng

=== Malaysia ===
Malaysia announced their final squad on 29 November 2024. Rahadiazli Rahalim and Harith Samsuri withdrew on 5 December due to injuries, and were replaced by Haziq Aiman and Harith Haiqal.

Head coach: (Spain) Pau Martí

No.	Pos.	Player	Date of birth (age)	Caps	Goals	Club
1	GK	Kalamullah Al-Hafiz	30 July 1995 (aged 29)	1	0	(Football Association of Malaysia) Selangor
2	DF	Declan Lambert	21 September 1998 (aged 26)	2	0	(Football Association of Malaysia) Kuala Lumpur City
3	DF	Khuzaimi Piee	11 November 1993 (aged 31)	9	0	(Football Association of Malaysia) Selangor
4	DF	Daniel Ting	1 December 1992 (aged 32)	11	1	(Football Association of Malaysia) Sabah
5	DF	Jimmy Raymond	26 April 1996 (aged 28)	0	0	(Football Association of Malaysia) Kuching City
6	DF	Dominic Tan (co-captain)	12 March 1997 (aged 27)	34	0	(Football Association of Malaysia) Sabah
7	FW	Haqimi Azim	6 January 2003 (aged 21)	8	1	(Football Association of Malaysia) Terengganu
8	MF	Stuart Wilkin	12 March 1998 (aged 26)	24	5	(Football Association of Malaysia) Sabah
9	FW	Darren Lok	14 December 1990 (aged 33)	36	6	(Football Association of Malaysia) Sabah
10	MF	Endrick	7 March 1995 (aged 29)	16	0	(Vietnam Football Federation) Ho Chi Minh City
11	FW	Najmuddin Akmal	11 January 2003 (aged 21)	0	0	(Football Association of Malaysia) Johor Darul Ta'zim II
12	FW	Daryl Sham	30 November 2002 (aged 22)	0	0	(Football Association of Malaysia) Johor Darul Ta'zim II
13	FW	Fazrul Amir	27 February 2000 (aged 24)	2	0	(Football Association of Malaysia) Kelantan Darul Naim
14	MF	Syamer Kutty Abba (co-captain)	1 October 1997 (aged 27)	39	2	(Football Association of Malaysia) Penang
15	MF	Muhammad Khalil	11 April 2005 (aged 19)	0	0	(Japan Football Association) FC Osaka
16	MF	Ezequiel Agüero	7 April 1994 (aged 30)	13	3	(Football Association of Malaysia) Sri Pahang
17	FW	Paulo Josué	13 March 1989 (aged 35)	19	6	(Football Association of Malaysia) Kuala Lumpur City
18	DF	Harith Haiqal	22 June 2002 (aged 22)	3	1	(Football Association of Malaysia) Selangor
19	FW	G. Pavithran	10 January 2005 (aged 19)	0	0	(Football Association of Malaysia) Johor Darul Ta'zim II
20	FW	Syafiq Ahmad (co-captain)	28 June 1995 (aged 29)	40	10	(Football Association of Malaysia) Kedah Darul Aman
21	MF	Danial Amier	27 March 1997 (aged 27)	2	0	(Football Association of Malaysia) Kuching City
22	FW	Fergus Tierney	19 March 2003 (aged 21)	2	0	(Football Association of Thailand) Chonburi
23	GK	Haziq Nadzli	6 January 1998 (aged 26)	1	0	(Football Association of Malaysia) Perak
24	DF	Aiman Hakimi	28 January 2005 (aged 19)	0	0	(Football Association of Malaysia) Selangor
25	DF	Adib Ra'op	25 October 1999 (aged 25)	3	1	(Football Association of Malaysia) Penang
26	GK	Haziq Aiman	19 January 2005 (aged 19)	0	0	(Football Association of Malaysia) Johor Darul Ta'zim II

=== Singapore ===
Singapore announced their 30-man preliminary list on 30 November 2024. The final squad was announced on 6 December.

Head coach: (Japan) Tsutomu Ogura

No.	Pos.	Player	Date of birth (age)	Caps	Goals	Club
1	GK	Izwan Mahbud	14 July 1990 (aged 34)	55	0	(Football Association of Singapore) Lion City Sailors
2	DF	Irfan Najeeb	31 July 1999 (aged 25)	4	1	(Football Association of Singapore) Tampines Rovers
3	DF	Ryhan Stewart	15 February 2000 (aged 24)	17	0	(Football Association of Singapore) Albirex Niigata (S)
4	DF	Nazrul Nazari	11 February 1991 (aged 33)	65	0	(Football Association of Singapore) Hougang United
5	DF	Amirul Adli	13 January 1996 (aged 28)	28	0	(Football Association of Singapore) Tampines Rovers
6	MF	Shah Shahiran	14 November 1999 (aged 25)	24	1	(Football Association of Singapore) Tampines Rovers
7	MF	Kyoga Nakamura	25 April 1996 (aged 28)	2	0	(Football Association of Singapore) Tampines Rovers
8	MF	Shahdan Sulaiman	9 May 1988 (aged 36)	89	6	(Football Association of Singapore) Hougang United
9	FW	Glenn Kweh	26 March 2000 (aged 24)	14	0	(Football Association of Singapore) Tampines Rovers
10	FW	Faris Ramli	24 August 1992 (aged 32)	83	13	(Football Association of Singapore) Tampines Rovers
11	DF	Shakir Hamzah	20 October 1992 (aged 32)	66	4	(Football Association of Singapore) Geylang International
12	GK	Syazwan Buhari	22 September 1992 (aged 32)	3	0	(Football Association of Singapore) Tampines Rovers
13	FW	Taufik Suparno	31 October 1995 (aged 29)	9	0	(Football Association of Singapore) Tampines Rovers
14	MF	Hariss Harun (captain)	19 November 1990 (aged 34)	133	12	(Football Association of Singapore) Lion City Sailors
15	DF	Lionel Tan	5 June 1997 (aged 27)	13	3	(Football Association of Singapore) Lion City Sailors
16	MF	Hami Syahin	16 December 1998 (aged 25)	26	0	(Football Association of Singapore) Lion City Sailors
17	DF	Jordan Emaviwe	9 April 2001 (aged 23)	1	0	(Football Association of Singapore) Balestier Khalsa
18	DF	Ryaan Sanizal	31 May 2002 (aged 22)	2	0	(Football Association of Singapore) Young Lions
19	DF	Raoul Suhaimi	18 September 2005 (aged 19)	0	0	(Football Association of Singapore) Young Lions
20	FW	Shawal Anuar	29 April 1991 (aged 33)	37	13	(Football Association of Singapore) Lion City Sailors
21	DF	Safuwan Baharudin	22 September 1991 (aged 33)	115	13	(Football Association of Malaysia) Selangor
22	DF	Christopher van Huizen	28 November 1992 (aged 32)	22	1	(Football Association of Singapore) Lion City Sailors
23	FW	Abdul Rasaq Akeem	16 June 2001 (aged 23)	1	0	(Football Association of Singapore) Lion City Sailors
24	DF	Naqiuddin Eunos	12 January 1997 (aged 27)	2	1	(Football Association of Singapore) Geylang International
25	FW	Farhan Zulkifli	10 November 2002 (aged 22)	3	1	(Football Association of Singapore) Hougang United
26	GK	Rudy Khairullah	19 July 1994 (aged 30)	0	0	(Football Association of Singapore) Geylang International

=== Thailand ===
Thailand announced their final squad on 26 November 2024.

Head coach: (Japan) Masatada Ishii

No.	Pos.	Player	Date of birth (age)	Caps	Goals	Club
1	GK	Patiwat Khammai	24 December 1994 (aged 29)	16	0	(Football Association of Thailand) Bangkok United
2	DF	James Beresford	17 April 2002 (aged 22)	1	0	(Football Association of Thailand) Uthai Thani
3	DF	Pansa Hemviboon	8 July 1990 (aged 34)	47	6	(Football Association of Thailand) Buriram United
4	DF	Jonathan Khemdee	9 May 2002 (aged 22)	3	0	(Football Association of Thailand) Ratchaburi
5	DF	Chalermsak Aukkee	25 August 1994 (aged 30)	9	0	(Football Association of Thailand) Port
6	DF	Thitathorn Aksornsri	8 November 1997 (aged 27)	2	0	(Football Association of Thailand) Uthai Thani
7	MF	Supachok Sarachat	22 May 1998 (aged 26)	36	9	(Japan Football Association) Hokkaido Consadole Sapporo
8	MF	Peeradon Chamratsamee (captain)	15 September 1992 (aged 32)	27	2	(Football Association of Thailand) Port
9	FW	Patrik Gustavsson	19 April 2001 (aged 23)	1	1	(Japan Football Association) Nara Club
10	FW	Suphanat Mueanta	2 August 2002 (aged 22)	26	11	(Royal Belgian Football Association) OH Leuven
11	FW	Anan Yodsangwal	9 July 2001 (aged 23)	5	0	(Football Association of Thailand) Lamphun Warriors
12	DF	Nicholas Mickelson	24 July 1999 (aged 25)	15	1	(Danish Football Association) OB
13	MF	Ben Davis	24 November 2000 (aged 24)	1	0	(Football Association of Thailand) Uthai Thani
14	FW	Teerasak Poeiphimai	21 September 2002 (aged 22)	11	0	(Football Association of Thailand) Port
15	DF	Saringkan Promsupa	29 March 1997 (aged 27)	1	0	(Football Association of Thailand) Sukhothai
16	MF	Akarapong Pumwisat	23 November 1995 (aged 29)	3	0	(Football Association of Thailand) Lamphun Warriors
17	FW	Ekanit Panya	21 October 1999 (aged 25)	25	2	(Japan Football Association) Urawa Red Diamonds
18	MF	Weerathep Pomphan	19 September 1996 (aged 28)	36	0	(Football Association of Thailand) Bangkok United
19	MF	William Weidersjö	10 June 2001 (aged 23)	5	0	(Football Association of Thailand) Uthai Thani
20	GK	Kampol Pathomakkakul	27 July 1992 (aged 32)	10	0	(Football Association of Thailand) Ratchaburi
21	DF	Suphanan Bureerat	10 October 1993 (aged 31)	23	1	(Football Association of Thailand) Port
22	MF	Worachit Kanitsribampen	24 August 1997 (aged 27)	21	2	(Football Association of Thailand) Port
23	GK	Korrakot Pipatnadda	15 July 1999 (aged 25)	1	0	(Football Association of Thailand) Rayong
24	DF	Apisit Sorada	28 February 1997 (aged 27)	1	0	(Football Association of Thailand) Ratchaburi
25	MF	Seksan Ratree	14 March 2003 (aged 21)	2	1	(Football Association of Thailand) Buriram United
26	DF	Kritsada Nontharat	16 February 2001 (aged 23)	0	0	(Football Association of Thailand) Bangkok United

=== Timor-Leste ===
Timor-Leste announced their final squad on 6 December 2024.

Head coach: (Chile) Simón Elissetche

No.	Pos.	Player	Date of birth (age)	Caps	Goals	Club
1	GK	Georgino Mendonça	16 March 2002 (aged 22)	2	0	(Football Federation of Cambodia) Life Sihanoukville
2	DF	Almerito	24 September 1993 (aged 31)	1	0	(East Timor Football Federation) Ponta Leste
3	FW	Kenny Ximenes	4 April 2005 (aged 19)	0	0	(Irish Football Association) Annagh United
4	DF	Francisco da Costa	15 April 1995 (aged 29)	2	0	(East Timor Football Federation) Assalam
5	DF	João Panji	2 March 2003 (aged 21)	14	0	(East Timor Football Federation) Assalam
6	MF	Jhon Frith	17 July 2002 (aged 22)	15	2	(Football Federation of Cambodia) ISI Dangkor Senchey
7	FW	Elias Mesquita	27 March 2002 (aged 22)	14	0	(Football Association of Brunei Darussalam) Indera
8	MF	Claudio Osorio	26 September 2002 (aged 22)	4	0	(East Timor Football Federation) Karketu Dili
9	FW	Olagar Xavier	18 May 2003 (aged 21)	9	0	(Bhutan Football Federation) Thimphu City
10	FW	João Pedro	24 June 1998 (aged 26)	18	5	(Football Federation of Cambodia) Angkor Tiger
11	MF	Zenivio	22 April 2005 (aged 19)	11	1	(Football Association of Singapore) Tanjong Pagar United
12	GK	Natalino Soares	25 December 2000 (aged 23)	1	0	(East Timor Football Federation) Karketu Dili
13	DF	Aniso Monteiro	1 July 2003 (aged 21)	1	0	(East Timor Football Federation) Lica-Lica Lemorai
14	MF	Kornelis Nahak	12 January 2001 (aged 23)	6	0	(East Timor Football Federation) SLB Laulara
15	MF	Santiago da Costa	13 April 1999 (aged 25)	5	0	(Football Australia) Greenvale United
16	MF	Freteliano	9 August 2004 (aged 20)	5	0	(East Timor Football Federation) Emmanuel
17	MF	Mário Quintão	18 February 2004 (aged 20)	6	0	(East Timor Football Federation) Emmanuel
18	DF	Filomeno Junior	21 June 1998 (aged 26)	21	0	(East Timor Football Federation) SLB Laulara
19	DF	Yohanes Gusmão	1 April 2000 (aged 24)	12	0	(East Timor Football Federation) SLB Laulara
20	GK	Junildo Pereira	4 June 2003 (aged 21)	13	0	(East Timor Football Federation) Assalam
21	FW	Gali Freitas (captain)	31 December 2004 (aged 19)	13	2	(Football Association of Indonesia) PSIS Semarang
22	DF	Nelson Viegas	24 December 1999 (aged 24)	22	1	(Football Australia) Greenvale United
23	DF	Anizo Correia	23 May 2003 (aged 21)	12	0	(Korea Football Association) Pyeongchang United
24	FW	Vabio Canavaro	25 January 2007 (aged 17)	0	0	(East Timor Football Federation) Ponta Leste
25	DF	Sandro Quintão	1 January 2003 (aged 21)	1	0	(East Timor Football Federation) Assalam
26	FW	Luís Figo	17 April 2005 (aged 19)	2	0	(East Timor Football Federation) Ponta Leste

== Group B ==
=== Indonesia ===
Indonesia announced their 33-man preliminary list on 25 November 2024. The squad was reduced to 30 players on 29 November after Dzaky Asraf, Made Tito and Arsa Ahmad withdrew injured. In the following day, Justin Hubner and Ivar Jenner withdrew from the squad due to their clubs' refusal to release them, reducing the list to 28 players. On 2 December, Alfan Suaib was removed from the squad, reducing the list to 27 players. On 4 December, Ikram Algiffari, Ananda Raehan, and Armando Oropa were removed from the squad. The final squad was announced on 6 December, containing 24 players rather than the allowed 26.

Head coach: (South Korea) Shin Tae-yong

No.	Pos.	Player	Date of birth (age)	Caps	Goals	Club
1	GK	Cahya Supriadi	11 February 2003 (aged 21)	0	0	(Football Association of Indonesia) Bekasi City
2	DF	Alfriyanto Nico	3 April 2003 (aged 21)	0	0	(Football Association of Indonesia) Dewa United
3	DF	Sulthan Zaky	23 March 2006 (aged 18)	0	0	(Football Association of Indonesia) PSM Makassar
4	DF	Kadek Arel	4 April 2005 (aged 19)	0	0	(Football Association of Indonesia) Bali United
5	DF	Kakang Rudianto	2 February 2003 (aged 21)	0	0	(Football Association of Indonesia) Persib Bandung
7	MF	Marselino Ferdinan	9 September 2004 (aged 20)	32	5	(The Football Association) Oxford United
8	MF	Arkhan Fikri	28 December 2004 (aged 19)	4	0	(Football Association of Indonesia) Arema
9	FW	Hokky Caraka	21 August 2004 (aged 20)	7	2	(Football Association of Indonesia) PSS Sleman
10	FW	Rafael Struick	27 March 2003 (aged 21)	21	1	(Football Australia) Brisbane Roar
11	FW	Ronaldo Kwateh	19 October 2004 (aged 20)	2	0	(Football Association of Thailand) Muangthong United
12	DF	Pratama Arhan	21 December 2001 (aged 22)	50	3	(Korea Football Association) Suwon FC
13	DF	Muhammad Ferarri (captain)	21 June 2003 (aged 21)	4	0	(Football Association of Indonesia) Persija Jakarta
14	DF	Asnawi Mangkualam	4 October 1999 (aged 25)	46	2	(Football Association of Thailand) Port
15	MF	Rayhan Hannan	2 April 2004 (aged 20)	0	0	(Football Association of Indonesia) Persija Jakarta
16	MF	Dony Tri Pamungkas	11 January 2005 (aged 19)	0	0	(Football Association of Indonesia) Persija Jakarta
17	MF	Zanadin Fariz	31 May 2004 (aged 20)	0	0	(Football Association of Indonesia) Persis Solo
18	FW	Victor Dethan	11 July 2004 (aged 20)	0	0	(Football Association of Indonesia) PSM Makassar
19	DF	Achmad Maulana	24 April 2003 (aged 21)	0	0	(Football Association of Indonesia) Arema
20	FW	Arkhan Kaka	2 September 2007 (aged 17)	0	0	(Football Association of Indonesia) Persis Solo
21	MF	Rivaldo Pakpahan	20 January 2003 (aged 21)	0	0	(Football Association of Indonesia) Borneo Samarinda
22	GK	Daffa Fasya	7 May 2004 (aged 20)	0	0	(Football Association of Indonesia) Borneo Samarinda
24	MF	Robi Darwis	22 August 2003 (aged 21)	0	0	(Football Association of Indonesia) Persib Bandung
25	DF	Mikael Tata	10 May 2004 (aged 20)	0	0	(Football Association of Indonesia) Persebaya Surabaya
26	GK	Erlangga Setyo	16 April 2003 (aged 21)	0	0	(Football Association of Indonesia) PSPS Pekanbaru

=== Laos ===
Laos announced their final squad on 2 December 2024.

Head coach: (South Korea) Ha Hyeok-jun

No.	Pos.	Player	Date of birth (age)	Caps	Goals	Club
1	GK	Kop Lokphathip	8 May 2006 (aged 18)	0	0	(Lao Football Federation) Ezra
2	DF	Somsavath Sophabmixay	25 May 1997 (aged 27)	2	0	(Lao Football Federation) Master
3	DF	Phoutthavong Sangvilay	16 October 2004 (aged 20)	17	2	(Lao Football Federation) Ezra
4	DF	Anantaza Siphongphan	9 November 2004 (aged 20)	18	0	(Lao Football Federation) Ezra
5	DF	Phetdavanh Somsanith	24 April 2004 (aged 20)	7	0	(Lao Football Federation) Master
6	MF	Chanthavixay Khounthoumphone	17 February 2004 (aged 20)	14	0	(Lao Football Federation) Ezra
7	MF	Anousone Xaypanya	16 December 2002 (aged 21)	12	0	(Lao Football Federation) Young Elephants
8	MF	Phoutthasay Khochalern	29 December 1995 (aged 28)	43	1	(Football Association of Thailand) Thap Luang United
9	FW	Kydavone Souvanny	22 December 1999 (aged 24)	14	2	(Lao Football Federation) Young Elephants
10	FW	Phathana Phommathep	27 February 1999 (aged 25)	18	1	(Lao Football Federation) Ezra
11	FW	Soukphachan Lueanthala	4 August 2002 (aged 22)	8	0	(Lao Football Federation) Master
12	GK	Keo-Oudone Souvannasangso	19 June 2000 (aged 24)	9	0	(Lao Football Federation) Lao Army
13	FW	Xayasith Singsavang	13 December 2000 (aged 23)	4	0	(Lao Football Federation) Namtha United
14	FW	Chony Waenpaseuth	27 November 2002 (aged 22)	16	1	(Lao Football Federation) Ezra
15	MF	Phoutdavy Phommasane	2 February 1994 (aged 30)	15	0	(Lao Football Federation) Master
16	MF	Damoth Thongkhamsavath	3 April 2004 (aged 20)	7	0	(Lao Football Federation) Ezra
17	MF	Bounphachan Bounkong (captain)	29 November 2000 (aged 24)	25	6	(Football Federation of Cambodia) Preah Khan Reach Svay Rieng
18	GK	Xaysavath Souvanhansok	3 September 1999 (aged 25)	12	0	(Lao Football Federation) Namtha United
19	MF	Phousomboun Panyavong	20 June 2007 (aged 17)	1	0	(Lao Football Federation) Lao Army
20	DF	Sengdaovy Hanthavong	4 October 1998 (aged 26)	6	0	(Lao Football Federation) Young Elephants
21	MF	Phoutthalak Thongsanith	3 December 2002 (aged 22)	2	0	(Lao Football Federation) Ezra
22	FW	Souphan Khambaion	30 January 2002 (aged 22)	0	0	(Lao Football Federation) Young Elephants
23	FW	Peter Phanthavong	15 February 2006 (aged 18)	1	0	(Lao Football Federation) Ezra
24	FW	Sisawad Dalavong	11 August 1996 (aged 28)	6	0	(Lao Football Federation) Lao Army
25	DF	Sonevilay Phetviengsy	27 May 2004 (aged 20)	0	0	(Lao Football Federation) Master
26	DF	Phonsak Seesavath	4 October 2004 (aged 20)	5	0	(Lao Football Federation) Young Elephants

=== Myanmar ===
Myanmar announced their 30-man preliminary list on 25 November 2024. The final squad was announced on 6 December.

Head coach: Myo Hlaing Win

No.	Pos.	Player	Date of birth (age)	Caps	Goals	Club
1	GK	Sann Satt Naing	4 November 1997 (aged 27)	10	0	(Myanmar Football Federation) Yangon United
2	DF	Hein Phyo Win	19 September 1998 (aged 26)	36	0	(Myanmar Football Federation) Shan United
3	DF	Thet Hein Soe	29 September 2001 (aged 23)	13	0	(Myanmar Football Federation) Shan United
4	DF	Soe Moe Kyaw	23 March 1999 (aged 25)	25	2	(Football Federation of Cambodia) Tiffy Army
5	DF	Nanda Kyaw	3 September 1996 (aged 28)	49	0	(Myanmar Football Federation) Shan United
6	MF	Aung Hlaing Win	12 September 1995 (aged 29)	3	0	(Myanmar Football Federation) Sagaing United
7	MF	Lwin Moe Aung	10 December 1999 (aged 24)	51	4	(Football Association of Thailand) Rayong
8	MF	Myat Kaung Khant	15 July 2000 (aged 24)	15	1	(Myanmar Football Federation) Shan United
9	FW	Win Naing Tun	3 May 2000 (aged 24)	37	3	(Football Association of Thailand) Chiangrai United
10	FW	Thiha Zaw (captain)	28 December 1993 (aged 30)	8	3	(Football Federation of Cambodia) Nagaworld
11	FW	Maung Maung Lwin	18 June 1996 (aged 28)	74	12	(Football Association of Thailand) Lamphun Warriors
12	MF	Khaing Ye Win	30 January 1997 (aged 27)	1	0	(Myanmar Football Federation) ISPE
13	MF	Aung Naing Win	1 June 1997 (aged 27)	8	0	(Myanmar Football Federation) Dagon Star United
14	MF	Wai Lin Aung	30 July 1999 (aged 25)	18	1	(Myanmar Football Federation) Yangon United
15	DF	Ye Lin Htet	18 July 1999 (aged 25)	1	0	(Myanmar Football Federation) Yangon United
16	FW	Aung Kaung Mann	18 February 1998 (aged 26)	30	2	(Football Association of Malaysia) Kelantan Darul Naim
17	DF	Thiha Htet Aung	13 March 1996 (aged 28)	19	0	(Myanmar Football Federation) Dagon Star United
18	GK	Pyae Phyo Thu	20 October 2002 (aged 22)	7	0	(Myanmar Football Federation) Shan United
19	FW	Oakkar Naing	8 November 2003 (aged 21)	5	0	(Myanmar Football Federation) Yangon United
20	DF	Thu Rein Soe	4 September 1998 (aged 26)	0	0	(Myanmar Football Federation) Yangon United
21	FW	Ye Yint Aung	22 March 2000 (aged 24)	8	1	(Myanmar Football Federation) Shan United
22	MF	Zaw Win Thein	1 March 2003 (aged 21)	15	0	(Myanmar Football Federation) Yangon United
23	GK	Zin Nyi Nyi Aung	6 June 2000 (aged 24)	0	0	(Myanmar Football Federation) Dagon Star United
24	DF	Latt Wai Phone	4 May 2005 (aged 19)	2	0	(Myanmar Football Federation) Hantharwady United
25	DF	Aung Wunna Soe	19 April 2000 (aged 24)	3	0	(Myanmar Football Federation) Shan United
26	FW	Yan Kyaw Htwe	13 October 1995 (aged 29)	1	0	(Myanmar Football Federation) Yangon United

=== Philippines ===
Philippines announced their final squad on 6 December 2024.

Head coach: (Spain) Albert Capellas

No.	Pos.	Player	Date of birth (age)	Caps	Goals	Club
1	GK	Patrick Deyto	15 February 1990 (aged 34)	18	0	(Philippine Football Federation) Kaya–Iloilo
2	DF	Adrian Ugelvik	21 September 2001 (aged 23)	2	0	(Norwegian Football Federation) Levanger
3	DF	Paul Tabinas	5 July 2002 (aged 22)	10	0	(Croatian Football Federation) Vukovar 1991
4	DF	Kike Linares	12 July 1999 (aged 25)	6	0	(Football Association of Thailand) Lamphun Warriors
5	DF	Scott Woods	7 May 2000 (aged 24)	7	0	(Football Association of Thailand) Muangthong United
6	MF	Sandro Reyes	29 March 2003 (aged 21)	17	1	(German Football Association) FC Gütersloh
7	FW	Pocholo Bugas	3 December 2001 (aged 23)	11	0	(Football Federation of Cambodia) Angkor Tiger
8	MF	Michael Baldisimo	13 April 2000 (aged 24)	6	0	(United States Soccer Federation) San Jose Earthquakes
9	FW	Jarvey Gayoso	11 February 1997 (aged 27)	21	2	(Football Federation of Cambodia) Phnom Penh Crown
10	FW	Bjørn Martin Kristensen	4 May 2002 (aged 22)	5	2	(Norwegian Football Federation) Aalesund
11	FW	Uriel Dalapo	8 August 2004 (aged 20)	1	0	(Philippine Football Federation) Davao Aguilas
12	DF	Amani Aguinaldo (captain)	24 April 1995 (aged 29)	63	0	(Football Association of Thailand) Rayong
13	FW	Alex Monis	20 March 2003 (aged 21)	7	0	(United States Soccer Federation) New England Revolution II
14	FW	Dov Cariño	18 December 2003 (aged 20)	0	0	(Philippine Football Federation) Ateneo de Manila University
15	GK	Nicholas Guimarães	9 August 2006 (aged 18)	0	0	(Japan Football Association) Ichiritsu Funabashi High School
16	GK	Quincy Kammeraad	1 February 2001 (aged 23)	0	0	(Philippine Football Federation) One Taguig
17	MF	Zico Bailey	27 August 2000 (aged 24)	4	1	(United States Soccer Federation) New Mexico United
18	FW	Patrick Reichelt	5 June 1988 (aged 36)	90	16	(Football Association of Malaysia) Kuala Lumpur City
19	MF	Oskari Kekkonen	24 September 1999 (aged 25)	10	0	(Football Association of Thailand) Lamphun Warriors
20	DF	Michael Kempter	12 January 1995 (aged 29)	5	0	(Swiss Football Association) Grasshoppers
21	DF	Santiago Rublico	18 August 2005 (aged 19)	12	0	(Royal Spanish Football Federation) Collado Villalba
22	GK	Florencio Badelic	22 May 1994 (aged 30)	0	0	(Philippine Football Federation) Dynamic Herb Cebu
23	DF	Christian Rontini	20 July 1999 (aged 25)	16	1	(Football Association of Indonesia) Madura United
24	MF	Javier Mariona	17 October 2004 (aged 20)	0	0	(United States Soccer Federation) Central Valley Fuego
25	DF	Joshua Meriño	11 February 2005 (aged 19)	0	0	(Philippine Football Federation) PFF Developmental Team
26	FW	Leo Maquiling	26 October 2000 (aged 24)	0	0	(Philippine Football Federation) Ateneo de Manila University

=== Vietnam ===
Vietnam announced their 30-man preliminary list on 18 November 2024 for a training camp in South Korea to prepare for the tournament. On 3 December, Nguyễn Văn Vĩ, Nguyễn Văn Toàn and Nguyễn Xuân Son were added to the squad, extending the list to 33 players. The final squad was announced on 5 December.

Head coach: (South Korea) Kim Sang-sik

No.	Pos.	Player	Date of birth (age)	Caps	Goals	Club
1	GK	Nguyễn Filip	14 September 1992 (aged 32)	9	0	(Vietnam Football Federation) Cong An Hanoi
2	DF	Đỗ Duy Mạnh (captain)	29 September 1996 (aged 28)	58	1	(Vietnam Football Federation) Hanoi FC
3	DF	Nguyễn Văn Vĩ	12 February 1998 (aged 26)	1	0	(Vietnam Football Federation) Thep Xanh Nam Dinh
4	DF	Bùi Tiến Dũng	2 October 1995 (aged 29)	50	1	(Vietnam Football Federation) The Cong-Viettel
5	DF	Trương Tiến Anh	25 April 1999 (aged 25)	8	1	(Vietnam Football Federation) The Cong-Viettel
6	DF	Nguyễn Thanh Bình	2 November 2000 (aged 24)	24	1	(Vietnam Football Federation) The Cong-Viettel
7	DF	Phạm Xuân Mạnh	27 March 1996 (aged 28)	14	0	(Vietnam Football Federation) Hanoi FC
8	MF	Châu Ngọc Quang	1 February 1996 (aged 28)	6	1	(Vietnam Football Federation) Hoang Anh Gia Lai
9	FW	Nguyễn Văn Toàn	12 April 1996 (aged 28)	64	7	(Vietnam Football Federation) Thep Xanh Nam Dinh
10	FW	Phạm Tuấn Hải	19 May 1998 (aged 26)	31	7	(Vietnam Football Federation) Hanoi FC
11	MF	Lê Phạm Thành Long	5 June 1996 (aged 28)	7	0	(Vietnam Football Federation) Cong An Hanoi
12	FW	Nguyễn Xuân Son	30 March 1997 (aged 27)	0	0	(Vietnam Football Federation) Thep Xanh Nam Dinh
13	DF	Hồ Tấn Tài	6 November 1997 (aged 27)	26	4	(Vietnam Football Federation) Becamex Binh Duong
14	MF	Nguyễn Hoàng Đức	11 January 1998 (aged 26)	39	2	(Vietnam Football Federation) Phu Dong Ninh Binh
15	FW	Bùi Vĩ Hào	24 February 2003 (aged 21)	5	1	(Vietnam Football Federation) Becamex Binh Duong
16	DF	Nguyễn Thành Chung	8 September 1997 (aged 27)	24	0	(Vietnam Football Federation) Hanoi FC
17	DF	Vũ Văn Thanh	14 April 1996 (aged 28)	52	5	(Vietnam Football Federation) Cong An Hanoi
18	FW	Đinh Thanh Bình	19 March 1998 (aged 26)	6	0	(Vietnam Football Federation) Phu Dong Ninh Binh
19	MF	Nguyễn Quang Hải	12 April 1997 (aged 27)	65	11	(Vietnam Football Federation) Cong An Hanoi
20	DF	Bùi Hoàng Việt Anh	1 January 1999 (aged 25)	22	1	(Vietnam Football Federation) Cong An Hanoi
21	GK	Nguyễn Đình Triệu	4 November 1991 (aged 33)	2	0	(Vietnam Football Federation) Haiphong
22	FW	Nguyễn Tiến Linh	20 October 1997 (aged 27)	50	21	(Vietnam Football Federation) Becamex Binh Duong
23	GK	Trần Trung Kiên	9 February 2003 (aged 21)	0	0	(Vietnam Football Federation) Hoang Anh Gia Lai
24	MF	Nguyễn Hai Long	27 August 2000 (aged 24)	3	0	(Vietnam Football Federation) Hanoi FC
25	MF	Doãn Ngọc Tân	15 August 1994 (aged 30)	0	0	(Vietnam Football Federation) Dong A Thanh Hoa
26	MF	Khuất Văn Khang	11 May 2003 (aged 21)	16	1	(Vietnam Football Federation) The Cong-Viettel

== Statistics ==
Note: Only the final squad list of each national team is taken into consideration.

=== Age ===
==== Outfield players ====
- Oldest: (Philippines) Patrick Reichelt (36 years, 156 days)
- Youngest: (Indonesia) Arkhan Kaka (17 years, 97 days)

==== Goalkeepers ====
- Oldest: (Philippines) Patrick Deyto (34 years, 297 days)
- Youngest: (Philippines) Nicholas Guimarães (18 years, 121 days)

==== Captains ====
- Oldest: (Singapore) Hariss Harun (34 years, 19 days)
- Youngest: (Timor-Leste) Gali Freitas (19 years, 343 days)

==== Coaches ====
- Oldest: (Japan) Tsutomu Ogura (Singapore) (61 years, 143 days)
- Youngest: (Spain) Pau Martí (Malaysia) (41 years, 70 days)

=== Player representation by country confederation ===
Confederation	Players	Percentage
AFC	244	94.57%
UEFA	10	3.88%
CONCACAF	4	1.55%

=== Player representation by league system ===
Nations in bold were represented at the tournament.

Country	Players	Percentage	Outside national squad	Lower tier players
**Cambodia**	34	13.18%	8	0
**Thailand**	32	12.40%	11	2
**Vietnam**	27	10.47%	1	2
**Malaysia**	26	10.08%	3	4
**Singapore**	26	10.08%	1	0
**Laos**	24	9.30%	0	0
**Indonesia**	21	8.14%	2	2
**Myanmar**	20	7.75%	0	0
**Timor-Leste**	15	5.81%	0	0
**Philippines**	7	2.71%	0	2
Japan	5	1.94%	5	3
United States	4	1.55%	4	3
Australia	3	1.16%	3	2
Norway	2	0.78%	2	2
South Korea	2	0.78%	2	1
Belgium	1	0.39%	1	0
Bhutan	1	0.39%	1	0
Brunei	1	0.39%	1	0
Croatia	1	0.39%	1	1
Denmark	1	0.39%	1	1
England	1	0.39%	1	1
Germany	1	0.39%	1	1
Northern Ireland	1	0.39%	1	1
Spain	1	0.39%	1	1
Switzerland	1	0.39%	1	0
**Total**	**258**	**100%**	**52 (20.16%)**	**29 (11.24%)**

=== Average age of squads ===
Average age	Countries
28.2	Singapore
27.1	Vietnam
26.1	Thailand
25.7	Myanmar
25.6	Malaysia
25.1	Cambodia
23.7	Philippines
22.5	Laos
22.4	Timor-Leste
20.3	Indonesia

=== Coaches representation by country ===
Coaches in bold represented their own country.

Number	Country	Coaches
3	Japan	Koji Gyotoku (Cambodia), Masatada Ishii (Thailand), Tsutomu Ogura (Singapore)
3	South Korea	Ha Hyeok-jun (Laos), Kim Sang-sik (Vietnam), Shin Tae-yong (Indonesia)
2	Spain	Albert Capellas (Philippines), Pau Martí (Malaysia)
1	Chile	Simón Elissetche (East Timor)
1	Myanmar	**Myo Hlaing Win**
