= 2021–22 Suphanburi F.C. season =

Suphanburi
2021–22 season
- Chairman: Varawut Silpa-archa
- Manager: Adebayo Gbadebo
- Stadium: Suphan Buri Provincial Stadium, Mueang Suphan Buri, Suphan Buri, Thailand
- Thai League T1: -
- Thai FA Cup: -
- Thai League Cup: -
- Top goalscorer: League: 2 players (5); All: 2 players (6)
Home colours	Away colours	Third colours

The 2021–22 season is Suphanburi's 9th consecutive seasons in top flight after promoted back from Thai League 2 in 2012. In this season, Suphanburi participates in 3 competitions which consisted of the Thai League, FA Cup, and League Cup.

The season was supposed to start on 31 July 2021 and concluded on 21 May 2022. Then, due to the situation of the COVID-19 pandemic is still severe, FA Thailand decided to postpone the season to start on 13 August 2021 instead. However, as it stands on 23 July 2021, the COVID-19's situation is getting even worse. Therefore, FA Thailand decided to postpone the opening day for the second time to start on 3 September 2021.

== Squad ==
As of 4 January 2022

Squad No.	Name	Nationality
Goalkeepers
1	Patrick Deyto (Vice-captain)	(Philippines)
19	Piyawat Intharapim	(Thailand)
37	Sahawit Khumpiam	(Thailand)
39	Adisak Bunthawi	(Thailand)
Defenders
3	Jung Han-cheol	(South Korea)
4	Patcharapol Intanee	(Thailand)
5	Piyachanok Darit	(Thailand)
6	Jakkit Wachpirom	(Thailand)
11	Weerawut Kayem	(Thailand)
17	Sitthichok Mool-on	(Thailand)
21	Phon-Ek Jensen	(Thailand)
27	Nattapon Malapun	(Thailand)
36	Thanaset Sujarit	(Thailand)
51	Kritsada Nontharat	(Thailand)
78	Saringkan Promsupa	(Thailand)
Midfielders
2	Thanapong Boontab	(Thailand)
7	Lossemy Karaboue	(France) (Ivory Coast)
16	Peeranat Jantawong	(Thailand)
18	Wasawat Koedsri	(Thailand)
30	Ratchanat Arunyapairot	(Thailand)
33	Santipap Ratniyorm	(Thailand)
77	Apichai Munotsa	(Thailand)
Forwards
8	William Henrique	(Brazil)
10	Kittisak Hochin	(Thailand)
14	Rittiporn Wanchuen	(Thailand)
20	Muhammadnasay Kolae	(Thailand)
29	Sarawut Thorarit	(Thailand)
99	Danilo Almeida Alves	(Brazil)
Players loaned out / left during season
3	Chayapol Supma	(Thailand)
9	Sihanart Suttisak	(Thailand)
16	Narathip Kruearanya	(Thailand)
11	Patrick Reichelt	(Philippines)
66	Daisuke Sato	(Philippines)
26	Suphan Thongsong	(Thailand)
8	Diego Lorenzi	(Brazil)
2	Chompoo Sangpo	(Thailand)
38	Sirimongkhon Jitbanjong	(Thailand)
36	Suwannapat Kingkaew	(Thailand)
29	Supawit Rompopak	(Thailand)
40	Hamed Bakhtiari	(Iran)

== Transfer ==
=== Pre-season transfer ===
==== In ====
Position	Player	Transferred from	Ref
FW	(Thailand) Narathip Kruearanya	(Thailand) Chonburi F.C.	Undisclosed
DF	(Iran) Hamed Bakhtiari	(Thailand) Nakhon Pathom United F.C.	Undisclosed
MF	(Thailand) Apichai Munotsa	(Thailand) Samut Prakan City F.C.	Undisclosed
GK	(Thailand) Piyawat Intharapim	(Thailand) MOF Customs United F.C.	Undisclosed
FW	(Thailand) Supawit Rompopak	(Thailand) Bangkok F.C.	Undisclosed
GK	(Thailand) Adisak Bunthawi	(Thailand) Ayutthaya United F.C.	Undisclosed
FW	(Thailand) Kittisak Hochin	(Thailand) PT Prachuap F.C.	Undisclosed
DF	(Thailand) Chompoo Sangpo	(Thailand) Police Tero F.C.	Undisclosed
MF	(Brazil) Diego Lorenzi	(Brazil) Associação Atlética Aparecidense	Undisclosed
FW	(Brazil) Danilo Almeida Alves	(Kazakhstan) FC Kyzylzhar	Undisclosed
FW	(France) Lossémy Karaboué	(Thailand) Ratchaburi Mitr Phol F.C.	Undisclosed
DF	(Philippines) Daisuke Sato	Unattached (Note: Most recently played for Muangthong United F.C.)	Free

==== Loan In ====
Position	Player	Transferred from	Ref
DF	(Thailand) Kritsada Nontharat	(Thailand) Bangkok United F.C.	Season loan
DF	(Thailand) Chayapol Supma	(Thailand) Muangthong United F.C.	Season loan (Note: Loan was terminated during the season)
FW	(Thailand) Sihanart Suttisak	(Thailand) Muangthong United F.C.	Season loan (Note: Loan was terminated during the season)
DF	(Thailand) Piyachanok Darit	(Thailand) BG Pathum United F.C.	Season loan
DF	(Thailand) Suwannapat Kingkaew	(Thailand) BG Pathum United F.C.	Season loan
FW	(Thailand) Rittiporn Wanchuen	(Thailand) Muangthong United F.C.	Season loan

==== Out ====
Position	Player	Transferred To	Ref
FW	(Brazil) Leandro Assumpção	(Thailand) Muangkan United F.C.	Undisclosed
FW	(Brazil) Caion	(Thailand) Muangkan United F.C.	Undisclosed
DF	(Brazil) Alef Vieira Santos	Unattached (Note: Join Khon Kaen United F.C. after contract has ended)	End of contract
MF	(Thailand) Kasidech Wettayawong	(Thailand) Ratchaburi Mitr Phol F.C.	Undisclosed
MF	(Thailand) Parndecha Ngernprasert	(Thailand) Khon Kaen United F.C.	Undisclosed
DF	(Thailand) Nattapong Phephat	(Thailand) Nongbua Pitchaya F.C.	Undisclosed
DF	(South Korea) Bae Shin-young	Unattached (Note: Join Persita Tangerang after contract has ended)	End of contract
DF	(Thailand) Supravee Miprathang	(Thailand) Kasetsart F.C.	Undisclosed
DF	(Thailand) Kongphop Luadsong	(Thailand) Ratchaburi Mitr Phol F.C.	Undisclosed
MF	(Thailand) Prasit Jantum	(Thailand) PT Prachuap F.C.	Undisclosed
GK	(Thailand) Chompong Somjit	(Thailand) Kasetsart F.C.	Undisclosed
FW	(Thailand) Tanaset Jintapaputanasiri	(Thailand) Chainat Hornbill F.C.	Undisclosed

==== Loan Out ====
Position	Player	Transferred To	Ref

=== Mid-season transfer ===
==== In ====
Position	Player	Transferred from	Ref
DF	(Thailand) Jakkit Wachpirom	(Thailand) Bangkok United F.C.	Free
FW	(Thailand) Sarawut Thorarit	(Thailand) Kasetsart F.C.	Undisclosed
DF	(Thailand) Phon-Ek Jensen	(Denmark) Vejle Boldklub	Undisclosed
DF	(Thailand) Weerawut Kayem	(Thailand) PT Prachuap F.C.	Free
MF	(Thailand) Thanapong Boontab	(Thailand) Kasetsart F.C.	Undisclosed
DF	(South Korea) Jung Han-cheol	(Japan) FC Imabari	Undisclosed
FW	(Brazil) William Henrique	(Qatar) Al-Shahania SC	Undisclosed
MF	(Thailand) Peeranat Jantawong	(Thailand) Inter Bangkok F.C.	Undisclosed

==== Loan In ====
Position	Player	Transferred from	Ref
DF	(Thailand) Thanaset Sujarit	(Thailand) Ratchaburi Mitr Phol F.C.	Season loan
DF	(Thailand) Patcharapol Intanee	(Thailand) Muangthong United F.C.	Season loan
DF	(Thailand) Saringkan Promsupa	(Thailand) Muangthong United F.C.	Season loan
FW	(Thailand) Muhammadnasay Kolae	(Thailand) Ratchaburi Mitr Phol F.C.	Season loan

==== Out ====
Position	Player	Transferred To	Ref
FW	(Thailand) Narathip Kruearanya	Unattached (Note: Later joined Thonburi United)	Contract terminated
FW	(Philippines) Patrick Reichelt	Unattached (Note: Later joined PT Prachuap F.C.)	Released
DF	(Philippines) Daisuke Sato	Unattached (Note: Later joined Ratchaburi Mitr Phol F.C.)	Released
DF	(Thailand) Suphan Thongsong	(Thailand) Bangkok United F.C.	Undisclosed
FW	(Thailand) Supawit Rompopak	(Thailand) Sukhothai F.C.	Undisclosed
MF	(Brazil) Diego Lorenzi	Unattached	Contract terminated
DF	(Iran) Hamed Bakhtiari	Unattached	Contract terminated

==== Loan Out ====
Position	Player	Transferred To	Ref
DF	(Thailand) Chompoo Sangpo	(Thailand) Navy F.C.	Season loan
MF	(Thailand) Sirimongkhon Jitbanjong	(Thailand) Navy F.C.	Season loan

== Competitions ==
=== Overview ===
Competition	First match	Last match	Starting round	Final position	Record							
Competition	First match	Last match	Starting round	Final position	Pld	W	D	L	GF	GA	GD	Win %
Thai League	4 September 2021	21 May 2022	Matchday 1		16	4	4	8	18	23	−5	25.00
FA Cup	27 October 2021		First round		2	2	0	0	6	0	+6	100.00
League Cup	12 January 2022	12 January 2022	First round	First round	1	0	0	1	1	3	−2	0.00
Total					19	6	4	9	25	26	−1	31.58

Last updated: 15 January 2022
Source: Competitions

=== Thai League 1 ===
==== League table ====
Pos	Team	Pld	W	D	L	GF	GA	GD	Pts	Qualification
12	Ratchaburi Mitr Phol	30	9	9	12	32	36	−4	36	
13	PT Prachuap	30	8	7	15	30	45	−15	31	
14	Suphanburi (R)	30	8	6	16	35	49	−14	30	Relegation to Thai League 2
15	Samut Prakan City (R)	30	6	10	14	29	42	−13	28	Relegation to Thai League 2
16	Chiangmai United (R)	30	4	7	19	28	56	−28	19	Relegation to Thai League 2

Updated to match(es) played on 4 May 2022. Source: Thai League
Rules for classification: 1) Points; 2) Head-to-head points; 3) Head-to-head goals difference; 4) Head-to-head goals scored; 5) Overall goals difference; 6) Overall goals scored; 7) Fair play points; 8) Play-off without extra time;).
(R) Relegated

==== Results summary ====
Overall								Home						Away					
Pld	W	D	L	GF	GA	GD	Pts	W	D	L	GF	GA	GD	W	D	L	GF	GA	GD
16	4	4	8	18	23	−5	16	2	3	3	11	12	−1	2	1	5	7	11	−4

==== Results by matchday ====
Matchday	1	2	3	4	5	6	7	8	9	10	11	12	13	14	15	16	17
Ground	A	H	H	H	A	H	A	H	A	H	A	H	A	A	H	A	A
Result	D	D	D	W	L	D	L	L	L	L	L	L	L	W	W	W	
Position	13	12	9	5	9	9	11	14	14	15	15	15	15	14	14		

A = Away; H = Home; W = Win; D = Draw; L = Loss

==== Matches ====
Win Draw Loss

4 September 2021 1	Buriram United	0-0	Suphanburi	Buriram
				Stadium: Chang Arena; Attendance: 5,933; Referee: Warintorn Sassadee

11 September 2021 2	Suphanburi	2-2	Chiangmai United	Suphan Buri
	Danilo 16'; Sihanart 67'; Sihanart (yellow card) 59' (yellow-red card) 67'		de Leeuw 32' (pen.); Todsapol 90+7'	Stadium: Suphan Buri Provincial Stadium; Attendance: 0 Referee: Panumas Phansamo

19 September 2021 3	Suphanburi	2-2	PT Prachuap	Suphan Buri
	Ratchanat 70'; Danilo 74'		Willen 18'; Saharat 64'	Stadium: Suphan Buri Provincial Stadium; Attendance: 0 Referee: Mongkolchai Pechsri

26 September 2021 4	Suphanburi	2-1	Port	Suphan Buri
	Ratchanat 18' (pen.) 50'		Bonilla 4'; Jaturapat (red card) 15'	Stadium: Suphan Buri Provincial Stadium; Attendance: 0 Referee: Noppadet Mangngam

3 October 2021 5	Nakhon Ratchasima	2-1	Suphanburi	Nakhon Ratchasima
	Sahanek 63' (pen.); Karikari 65'		Ratchanat 7'	Stadium: 80th Birthday Stadium; Attendance: 539; Referee: Torphong Somsing

6 October 2021 6	Suphanburi	1-1	Ratchaburi Mitr Phol	Suphan Buri
	Sihanart 17'		Kritsananon 54'	Stadium: Suphan Buri Provincial Stadium; Attendance: 925; Referee: Natee Choosuwan

10 October 2021 7	Chonburi	1-0	Suphanburi	Chonburi
	Kelić 83'		Suwannapat (yellow card) 71' (yellow-red card) 80'	Stadium: Chonburi Stadium; Attendance: 2,030; Referee: Panumas Phansamo

16 October 2021 8	Suphanburi	0-2	BG Pathum United	Suphan Buri
			Pathompol 47'; Chaowat 62'	Stadium: Suphan Buri Provincial Stadium; Attendance: 1,106; Referee: Mongkolchai Pechsri

24 October 2021 9	Nongbua Pitchaya	2-1	Suphanburi	Nong Bua Lamphu
	Hamilton 78'; Yod 85'		Reichelt 9' (pen.)	Stadium: Pitchaya Stadium; Attendance: 416; Referee: Noppadet Mangngam

30 October 2021 10	Suphanburi	2-4	Khon Kaen United	Suphan Buri
	Supawit 53'; Rittiporn 90+3'		Islame 1' 36'; Ibson 17' 44'	Stadium: Suphan Buri Provincial Stadium; Attendance: 616; Referee: Natee Choosuwan

7 November 2021 11	Muangthong United	2-1	Suphanburi	Nonthaburi
	Mirzaev 7' 54'		Ratchanat 4'	Stadium: Thunderdome Stadium; Attendance: 2,145; Referee: Mongkolchai Pechsri

10 November 2021 12	Suphanburi	0-1	Leo Chiangrai United	Suphan Buri
			Brinner 84'; Felipe Amorim (red card) 54'	Stadium: Suphan Buri Provincial Stadium; Attendance: 653; Referee: Paisan Bendem-alee

13 November 2021 13	Police Tero	1-0	Suphanburi	Bangkok
	Jenphob 37'			Stadium: Boonyachinda Stadium; Attendance: 848; Referee: Winat Phophat

20 November 2021 14	Samut Prakan City	1-2	Suphanburi	Samut Prakan
	Sakai 50'		Danilo 13'; Karaboue 37'	Stadium: Samut Prakarn SAT Stadium; Attendance: 451; Referee: Noppadet Mangngam

28 November 2021 15	Suphanburi	2-0	True Bangkok United	Suphan Buri
	Danilo 6' 51'			Stadium: Suphan Buri Provincial Stadium; Attendance: 1,101; Referee: Songkran Bunmeekiart

Chiangmai United	v	Suphanburi	Chiang Mai
			Stadium: 700th Anniversary Stadium

15 January 2022 16	PT Prachuap	1-2	Suphanburi	Prachuap Khiri Khan
	Willen 70'		William 56' 61'; Santipap (yellow card) 57' (yellow-red card) 69'	Stadium: Sam Ao Stadium; Attendance: 445; Referee: Niwat Insa-ard

23 January 2022 17	Port	v	Suphanburi	Bangkok
				Stadium: PAT Stadium

=== Thai FA Cup ===
==== Matches ====
Win Draw Loss

27 October 2021 First round	Suphanburi (T1)	3-0	Chiangrai (TA)	Suphan Buri
	Sihanart 61'; Karaboue 76'; Ratchanat 90'			Stadium: Suphan Buri Provincial Stadium

24 November 2021 Second round	Suphanburi (T1)	3-0	Chainat United (T3)	Suphan Buri
	Wasawat 10'; Sitthichok 19'; Danilo 90+2'			Stadium: Suphan Buri Provincial Stadium; Attendance: 304; Referee: Kotchapoom Meesridaecha

19 January 2022 Third round	Chiangmai United (T1)	2–3	Suphanburi (T1)	Mae Rim, Chiangmai
	Bill 27'; Yannick Boli 85'	Report; Highlight	Danilo Alves 1', 11'; Sarawut Thorarit 90+3'	Stadium: 700th Anniversary of Chiangmai Stadium; Attendance: 838; Referee: Sarayut Jakngoen; Assistant referees: Rawut Nakarit, Kanchit Nittayachart; Fourth official: Wathanyu Morin

16 February 2022 Quarter-finals	Suphanburi (T1)	1–0	Songkhla (T3)	Mueang, Suphanburi
	Danilo Alves 14'	Report; Highlight		Stadium: Suphanburi Provincial Stadium; Attendance: 1,704; Referee: Songkran Bunmeekiart; Assistant referees: Watthana Chonchanakul, Phubes Lekpha; Fourth official: Noppadet Mangngam

18 May 2022 Semi-finals	Suphanburi (T1)	v	Buriram United (T1)	Chonburi, Thailand
				Stadium: Chonburi Stadium

=== Thai League Cup ===
==== Matches ====
Win Draw Loss

12 January 2022 First round	Krabi (T3)	3-2 (a.e.t.)	Suphanburi (T1)	Krabi
	Di Estefano 71'; Chudit 94'; Koné 120'		Danilo 62'; Karaboue 100'	Stadium: Krabi Provincial Stadium; Attendance: 492; Referee: Paisan Bendem-alee

== Team statistics ==
=== Appearances and goals ===
As of 15 January 2022

No.	Pos.	Player	League		FA Cup		League Cup		Total	
No.	Pos.	Player	Apps.	Goals	Apps.	Goals	Apps.	Goals	Apps.	Goals
1	GK	(Philippines) Patrick Deyto	16	0	0	0	0	0	16	0
2	MF	(Thailand) Thanapong Boontab	1	0	0	0	0	0	1	0
3	DF	(South Korea) Jung Han-cheol	1	0	0	0	0+1	0	1+1	0
4	DF	(Thailand) Patcharapol Intanee	0	0	0	0	1	0	1	0
5	DF	(Thailand) Piyachanok Darit	6+1	0	0	0	1	0	7+1	0
6	DF	(Thailand) Jakkit Wachpirom	1	0	0	0	0+1	0	1+1	0
7	MF	(France) Lossemy Karaboue	14	1	0+1	1	0+1	1	14+2	3
8	FW	(Brazil) William Henrique	1	2	0	0	0	0	1	2
10	FW	(Thailand) Kittisak Hochin	5+3	0	2	0	1	0	8+3	0
11	DF	(Thailand) Weerawut Kayem	0+1	0	0	0	0	0	0+1	0
14	FW	(Thailand) Rittiporn Wanchuen	2+6	1	2	0	1	0	5+6	1
16	MF	(Thailand) Peeranat Jantawong	0	0	0	0	0	0	0	0
17	DF	(Thailand) Sitthichok Mool-on	0+3	0	1	1	1	0	2+3	1
18	MF	(Thailand) Wasawat Koedsri	0+2	0	1	1	0	0	1+2	1
19	GK	(Thailand) Piyawat Intharapim	0	0	2	0	0	0	2	0
20	FW	(Thailand) Muhammadnasay Kolae	0	0	0	0	1	0	1	0
21	DF	(Thailand) Phon-Ek Jensen	1	0	0	0	0+1	0	1+1	0
27	DF	(Thailand) Nattapon Malapun	13+1	0	0+1	0	0	0	13+2	0
29	FW	(Thailand) Sarawut Thorarit	0	0	0	0	0	0	0	0
30	MF	(Thailand) Ratchanat Arunyapairot	11+3	5	0+2	1	1	0	12+5	6
33	MF	(Thailand) Santipap Ratniyorm	8+7	0	1+1	0	0+1	0	9+9	0
36	DF	(Thailand) Thanaset Sujarit	1	0	0	0	1	0	2	0
37	GK	(Thailand) Sahawit Khumpiam	0	0	0	0	0	0	0	0
39	GK	(Thailand) Adisak Bunthawi	0	0	0	0	1	0	1	0
51	DF	(Thailand) Kritsada Nontharat	8+1	0	2	0	1	0	11+1	0
77	MF	(Thailand) Apichai Munotsa	0	0	0	0	0	0	0	0
78	DF	(Thailand) Saringkan Promsupa	0	0	0	0	1	0	1	0
99	FW	(Brazil) Danilo Almeida Alves	14	5	0+1	1	0+1	1	14+2	7
Players loaned out / left during season
3	DF	(Thailand) Chayapol Supma	6+4	0	0	0	0	0	6+4	0
9	FW	(Thailand) Sihanart Suttisak	5+3	2	0+1	1	0	0	5+4	3
16	FW	(Thailand) Narathip Kruearanya	0+1	0	1	0	0	0	1+1	0
11	FW	(Philippines) Patrick Reichelt	10	1	0	0	0	0	10	1
66	DF	(Philippines) Daisuke Sato	14	0	0	0	0	0	14	0
26	DF	(Thailand) Suphan Thongsong	6+2	0	2	0	0	0	8+2	0
8	MF	(Brazil) Diego Lorenzi	10	0	0	0	0	0	10	0
2	DF	(Thailand) Chompoo Sangpo	1+2	0	2	0	0	0	3+2	0
38	MF	(Thailand) Sirimongkhon Jitbanjong	5+3	0	2	0	0	0	7+3	0
36	DF	(Thailand) Suwannapat Kingkaew	8+2	0	2	0	0	0	10+2	0
29	FW	(Thailand) Supawit Rompopak	4+7	1	2	0	0	0	6+7	1
40	DF	(Iran) Hamed Bakhtiari	4+2	0	0	0	0	0	4+2	0

== Overall summary ==
=== Season summary ===
Games played	18 (16 Thai League, 2 FA Cup, 0 League Cup)
Games won	6 (4 Thai League, 2 FA Cup, 0 League Cup)
Games drawn	4 (4 Thai League, 0 FA Cup, 0 League Cup)
Games lost	8 (8 Thai League, 0 FA Cup, 0 League Cup)
Goals scored	24 (18 Thai League, 6 FA Cup, 0 League Cup)
Goals conceded	23 (23 Thai League, 0 FA Cup, 0 League Cup)
Goal difference	+1
Clean sheets	4 (2 Thai League, 2 FA Cup, 0 League Cup)
Best result	3-0 (2 games)
Worst result	0-2 vs BG Pathum United (16 October 21)
Most appearances	Santipap Ratniyorm (17)
Top scorer	2 players (6)
Points	16

=== Score overview ===
Opposition	Home score	Away score	Double
BG Pathum United	0-2		No
Buriram United		0-0	No
Chiangmai United	2-2		No
Chonburi		1-0	No
Khon Kaen United	2-4		No
Leo Chiangrai United	0-1		No
Muangthong United		2-1	No
Nakhon Ratchasima		2-1	No
Nongbua Pitchaya		2-1	No
Police Tero		1-0	No
Port	2-1		
PT Prachuap	2-2	1-2	No
Ratchaburi Mitr Phol	1-1		No
Samut Prakan City		1-2	
True Bangkok United	2-0		
