= Capellas =

Capellas is a surname. Notable people with the surname include:

- Albert Capellas, Spanish association football manager and former player
- Michael Capellas (born 1954), American businessman
