= Patrick Deyto =

Filipino footballer (born 1990)

- Deyto in 2023

Personal information
- Full name: Patrick Phillip Bravo Deyto
- Date of birth: February 15, 1990 (age 36)
- Place of birth: Manila, Philippines
- Height: 1.85 m (6 ft 1 in)
- Position: Goalkeeper

Team information
- Current team: Kaya–Iloilo
- Number: 40

College career
Years	Team	Apps	(Gls)
- De La Salle University

Senior career*
Years	Team	Apps	(Gls)
2012	Pachanga		
2012–2014	Green Archers United	34	(0)
2014–2018	Global Cebu	76	(0)
2018	Davao Aguilas	11	(0)
2019	Stallion Laguna	5	(0)
2019–2022	Suphanburi	61	(0)
2022–2023	PT Prachuap	12	(0)
2023	Stallion Laguna	2	(0)
2023–2024	Chonburi	27	(0)
2024–	Kaya–Iloilo	1	(0)

International career^{‡}
2013	Philippines U23	1	(0)
2014–2026	Philippines	24	(0)
- * Club domestic league appearances and goals as of 06:43, August 24, 2024 (UTC) ‡ National team caps and goals as of 13:18, August 9, 2026 (UTC)

Patrick Phillip Bravo Deyto (born February 15, 1990) is a Filipino professional footballer who plays as a goalkeeper for Philippines Football League club Kaya–Iloilo.

== Early life and education ==
Paatrick Deyto was born on February 15, 1990, in Manila. He took up football when he was in first grade and decided to play in the goalkeeping position but experimented playing in the midfield and forward positions. He attended the De La Salle Santiago Zobel School in Muntinlupa for his high school studies and attended De La Salle University for his collegiate studies, obtaining a degree in business management in 2013.

== High school career ==
During his stay at De La Salle Zobel, Deyto played for his high school's football team which was coached by Hans Smit. In his junior high school year, Deyto decided to settle back to his original position as a goalkeeper.

== Collegiate career ==
Deyto played for the football team of his college, De La Salle University in the UAAP. The team was also mentored by Hans Smit. On his debut season for the Green Booters he was named as UAAP Season 73 Men's Football Best Goalkeeper Award. He was also named as MVP in the Alaska Cup and APT Global Football Cup. Though he failed to lead his team to a UAAP football title, he helped De La Salle win other tournaments such as the 2011 University Games, and the 2012 Independent Philippine Petroleum Companies Association (IPPCA) Football Pre-Season Cup.

== Club career ==
=== Green Archers United ===
During the off-season of the UAAP, Deyto played in the United Football League (UFL). He signed up with Pachanga F.C. as a college junior student staying in the club for just five to six months before moving to Green Archers United at the end of his senior year in college.

In July 2014, after his 2 1/2-year stint with the Archers, Deyto announced that he left the club and will join fellow United Football League club Global.

=== Global Cebu ===
On July 15, 2014, he joined United Football League club Global. Deyto was often benched during his first year with Global despite according to himself that he played 60 percent of the club's games but was given the chance to perform in the last four games of the 2014 UFL season which led to him becoming the first choice keeper of Global. In the 2016 UFL season, Deyto helped the club win the league title and played 90 percent of the club's matches. He also helped Global clinch the 2016 UFL Cup where he was named Best Goalkeeper. He remained with his club, which renamed itself as Global Cebu FC, when it joined the inaugural Philippines Football League (PFL) in 2017.

Deyto left Global Cebu on July 5, 2018, and is set to move to another PFL club. Apart from his participation in domestic tournaments, Deyto also was instrumental to Global's campaign in the AFC Cup and AFC Champions League. He will reportedly join the Davao Aguilas and had also offers from Stallion Laguna.

=== Davao Aguilas ===
Deyto moved to Davao Aguilas during the PFL mid-season transfer window in July 2018. He made his Davao Aguilas debut in a 1–1 draw against his former club Global Cebu on July 18. Deyto kept his first clean sheet for the club in a 3–0 victory over JPV Marikina. Davao Aguilas was disbanded after the 2018 PFL season, forcing Deyto to look for a new club.

=== Stallion Laguna ===
Deyto joined Stallion Laguna in January 2019. However, Deyto only played for Stallions for the first half of the 2019 PFL season. The uncertainty of the PFL, with clubs either folding or leaving the league in the past seasons, prompted Deyto to accept an offer to play in Thailand.

=== Suphanburi ===
Deyto joined Suphanburi of Thai League 1 in July 2019 after Stallion approved his release. The club fared poorly in 2020 season which was marred by the COVID-19 pandemic, losing 11 games in a row. Deyto helped the team avoid relegation and was given a contract extension.

In the 2021–22. season, Deyto played in 22 games, saved 80 goals and conceded 33 goals.

=== PT Prachuap ===
Deyto moved to PT Prachuap in July 2022, ahead of the 2022–23 Thai League 1 season.

=== Chonburi ===
In June 2023, Chonburi of Thai League 1 has signed in Deyto.

=== Return to Stallion Laguna ===
Deyto returned to Stallion Laguna for the latter part of the 2022–23 Philippines Football League season.

=== Chonburi ===
In June 2023, Chonburi of Thai League 1 has signed in Deyto for the 2023–24 season.

== International career ==
=== Youth ===
In June 2013, he was called up to the Philippines U-23 team for a friendly game against Singapore U-23.

=== Senior ===
In February 2013, Deyto was called up for the national team training ahead of their preparations for the 2014 AFC Challenge Cup qualification against Cambodia, Brunei, and Turkmenistan.

In March 2014, he was again called up to the senior team, but now by new Azkals head coach Thomas Dooley in a friendly match against Malaysia as a reserve but eventually played as a starter after Roland Muller cancelled his flight and couldn't play due to a flu.

He was selected in the final 23-man squad for the 2014 AFC Challenge Cup which was held in Maldives. Because of the absence of Muller and Neil Etheridge who were both unavailable because of club duties, Deyto was the starting goalkeeper for the Philippines during the 2014 AFF Championship.

Deyto played his first match for the Philippines in almost five years after featuring in the 1–0 friendly win against Nepal on 15 June 2023.

Deyto was selected as the main choice goalkeeper in the 2024 ASEAN Championship after Neil Etheridge and Kevin Ray Mendoza were denied from leaving their respective clubs due to league fixtures. He played in all four group stage matches, sustaining a leg injury in the last one against Indonesia.

Deyto retired from international duty after the 2026 ASEAN Championship.
