= Scott Woods =

American poet

Scott Woods (born January 25, 1971) is an American author and poet from Columbus, Ohio.

Woods is the former president of Poetry Slam Inc. and co-founded the poetry series, Writers Block. He authors a monthly Internet column and has published several books. He is employed at the Columbus Metropolitan Library, where he has worked for over twenty years. Since 2006 Woods has conducted an annual, 24-hour, solo poetry reading. In 2013 he published the book We Over Here Now on Brick Cave Books. In 2016 he published his second book of poetry with Brick Cave Media titled "Urban Contemporary History Month". His work appeared on National Public Radio (NPR) in 2003 and 2005. He was profiled in the 2006 edition of the book: Contemporary Black Biography: Profiles from the International Black Community.

== Streetlight Guild ==
In June 2019, Woods opened Streetlight Guild, an arts venue on East Main Street, after enormous response to his Holler: 31 Days of Black Columbus Art events series, and in pursuit of an answer to the question of what Columbus culture is. Streetlight Guild focuses on local art and underrepresented voices. In 2019 and 2020, Streetlight Guild hosted Rhapsody and Refrain in September, an event consisting of thirty consecutive days of Columbus local poetry. Due to the COVID-19 pandemic, the venue adapted, hosting poets online. In November 2019, Streetlight Guild hosted the first annual Parallels Writing Conference.
