= Diego Lorenzi =

Italian priest

Fr. Diego Lorenzi, F.D.P. (born 14 November 1939) is an Italian Roman Catholic priest who served as the personal secretary to Pope John Paul I. Lorenzi served as a private secretary of Cardinal Albino Luciani in Venice for two years prior to his election to the papacy in 1978, and remained his secretary for his brief pontificate. During his time as John Paul I's personal secretary, he was aided by John Magee, an Irish priest who would later become a bishop.

== Death of John Paul I ==
After one of the nuns who worked in the papal household and Magee, Lorenzi was one of the first people to learn of Pope John Paul I's death, thirty-three days into his pontificate. Upon learning of the Pope's death, he telephoned his doctor, despite instructions from the Secretary of State. Previous to Pope John Paul I's death, Lorenzi reported that he had been told by the Pope's personal doctor that his health was excellent. Despite theories mentioning this as grounds for suspecting foul play in the death of Pope John Paul I, Lorenzi has rejected these views and stated he believes Pope John Paul I died of a heart attack.

== Philippines ==
In 1996, Lorenzi was sent by his superiors to Payatas, in the Philippines, to serve the community that contained Asia's biggest landfill.

== See also ==
- John Paul I
- Pope John Paul I conspiracy theories

Catholic Church titles
Preceded by Pasquale Macchi	Personal Papal Secretary; 26 August 1978 – 28 September 1978	Succeeded by Stanisław Dziwisz
