= Phon-Ek Jensen =

Thai footballer (born 2003)

Personal information
- Full name: Phon-ek Maneekorn Jensen
- Date of birth: 30 May 2003 (age 23)
- Place of birth: Songkhla, Thailand
- Height: 1.65 m (5 ft 5 in)
- Position: Left back

Team information
- Current team: PT Prachuap
- Number: 74

Youth career
- 2019–2021: Vejle Boldklub

Senior career*
Years	Team	Apps	(Gls)
2022	Suphanburi	7	(0)
2022–2024	Pattaya United	36	(3)
2024–	PT Prachuap	38	(2)

International career^{‡}
2022	Thailand U19	3	(0)
2024–	Thailand U23	20	(2)
- * Club domestic league appearances and goals as of 9 April 2025 (UTC) ‡ National team caps and goals as of 26 March 2024 (UTC)

Phon-Ek Maneekorn Jensen (Thai: พลเอก มณีกร เจนเซ่น; born 30 May 2003) is a professional footballer who plays as a left back for Thai League 1 club PT Prachuap. Phon-Ek raised in Denmark, plays for Thailand internationally.

== International career ==
In 2024, he was called up by Thailand U23 for 2024 AFC U-23 Asian Cup in Qatar.

== Honours ==
=== Club ===
Pattaya Dolphins United

- Thai League 3 Eastern Region: 2022–23
