= Sahawit Khumpiam =

Thai footballer

Personal information
- Full name: Sahawit Khumpiam
- Date of birth: 17 November 1994 (age 31)
- Place of birth: Bangkok, Thailand
- Height: 1.82 m (5 ft 11 1/2 in)
- Position: Goalkeeper

Team information
- Current team: Lamphun Warriors

Youth career
- 2015–2016: Muangthong United

Senior career*
Years	Team	Apps	(Gls)
2017–2018	Muangthong United	0	(0)
2017	→ Air Force Central (loan)	2	(0)
2018	Air Force Central	5	(0)
2019	Kasetsart	21	(0)
2020–2022	Suphanburi	11	(0)
2022–2023	Lamphun Warriors	8	(0)
2023–2024	Suphanburi	27	(0)
2024	Kanchanaburi Power	9	(0)
2025	Police Tero	3	(0)
2025–	Lamphun Warriors	0	(0)
- * Club domestic league appearances and goals as of 4 July 2025

Sahawit Khumpiam (Thai: สหวิช ขำเปี่ยม; born 17 November 1994) is a Thai professional footballer who plays as a goalkeeper.

== Personal life ==
Sahawit's father, Chaiyong Khumpiam, is a retired footballer who also played as a goalkeeper.
