= Kittisak Hochin =

Thai footballer

Personal information
- Full name: Kittisak Hochin
- Date of birth: 19 January 1994 (age 32)
- Place of birth: Bangkok, Thailand
- Height: 1.73 m (5 ft 8 in)
- Position: Forward

Youth career
- 2010–2014: Assumption College Thonburi

Senior career*
Years	Team	Apps	(Gls)
2012	Assumption College Thonburi	19	(4)
2013–2014	Muangthong United	0	(0)
2013	→ Nakhon Nayok (loan)	6	(3)
2015–2016	Pattaya United	5	(0)
2017–2018	Bangkok	19	(3)
2019	Thai Honda	33	(2)
2020–2021	Prachuap	22	(0)
2021–2022	Suphanburi	16	(0)
2022–2023	Rajpracha	20	(2)
2023	Bangkok	10	(0)
Total		150	(14)

International career
2009–2011	Thailand U16	3	(2)
2012	Thailand U19	1	(0)
- * Club domestic league appearances and goals as of 16 September 2023

Kittisak Hochin (Thai: กิตติศักดิ์ โฮชิน; born January 19, 1994) is a Thai former professional footballer who plays as a forward.
