= Apichai Munotsa =

Thai footballer (born 1992)

Personal information
- Full name: Apichai Munotsa
- Date of birth: 25 February 1992 (age 34)
- Place of birth: Udon Thani, Thailand
- Height: 1.78 m (5 ft 10 in)
- Position: Midfielder

Youth career
- Landskrona BoIS
- Lunds BK

Senior career*
Years	Team	Apps	(Gls)
2012	Svedala IF	7	(1)
2014–2015	Bosnien Hercegovinas SK	18	(3)
2016	BW 90 IF	21	(1)
2017	Kvarnsvedens IK	18	(3)
2018	Chonburi	8	(0)
2018	→ PT Prachuap (loan)	14	(0)
2019	Udon Thani	15	(0)
2020–2021	Samut Prakan City	14	(1)
2021–2022	Suphanburi	3	(0)
- * Club domestic league appearances and goals

Apichai Munotsa (Thai: อภิชัย หมั่นอุตส่าห์, born 25 February 1992), is a Thai former professional footballer who plays as a midfielder.
