= Jung Han-cheol =

South Korean footballer (born 1996)

Personal information
- Date of birth: 20 June 1996 (age 30)
- Place of birth: South Korea
- Height: 1.84 m (6 ft 0 in)
- Position: Defender

Team information
- Current team: Gimpo FC
- Number: 5

Youth career
- Hanama
- Sungkyunkwan University

Senior career*
Years	Team	Apps	(Gls)
2018–2020	Machida Zelvia	0	(0)
2019	→ YSCC Yokohama (loan)	18	(1)
2020–2021	Imabari	45	(3)
2022	Suphanburi	13	(3)
2022–2023	Khon Kaen United	32	(6)
2024–	Gimpo FC	2	(0)
- * Club domestic league appearances and goals as of 19 February 2023(UTC)

- Jung Han-cheol
- Hangul: 정한철
- RR: Jeong Hancheol
- MR: Chŏng Hanch'ŏl

Jung Han-cheol (Korean: 정한철; born 20 June 1996) is a South Korean footballer currently playing as a defender for K League 4.

== Career statistics ==
=== Club ===
As of 3 March 2019.

Club	Season	League			Cup		Continental		Other		Total	
Club	Season	Division	Apps	Goals	Apps	Goals	Apps	Goals	Apps	Goals	Apps	Goals
Machida Zelvia	2018	J2 League	0	0	0	0	0	0	0	0	0	0
Machida Zelvia	2019	J2 League	0	0	0	0	0	0	0	0	0	0
Machida Zelvia	Total		0	0	0	0	0	0	0	0	0	0
YSCC Yokohama (loan)	2019	J3 League	18	1	0	0	0	0	0	0	18	1
Career total			18	1	0	0	0	0	0	0	18	1
