= Oskari Kekkonen =

Association football player (born 1999)

Personal information
- Full name: Oskari Johannes Orevillo Kekkonen
- Date of birth: 24 September 1999 (age 27)
- Place of birth: Kotka, Finland
- Height: 1.74 m (5 ft 9 in)
- Position: Midfielder

Team information
- Current team: Sabah

Youth career
- Peli-Karhut
- 2019: SJK Seinäjoki

Senior career*
Years	Team	Apps	(Gls)
2016	KTP	11	(0)
2016	→ Sudet (loan)	2	(0)
2017–2018	Lahti	7	(0)
2017	→ FC Kuusysi (loan)	16	(1)
2018	→ PKKU (loan)	5	(0)
2018	→ KTP (loan)	6	(0)
2019	PeKa	19	(5)
2019–2021	PEPO	21	(3)
2021	PeKa	2	(0)
2021–2022	Azkals Development Team	0	(0)
2022	Kaya-Iloilo	12	(0)
2023	PK-35	6	(0)
2023–2026	Lamphun Warriors	61	(1)
2026–	Sabah		

International career^{‡}
2017	Finland U18		
2021–2022	Philippines U23	10	(1)
2021–	Philippines	13	(0)
- * Club domestic league appearances and goals as of 22:00, 10 May 2026 (UTC) ‡ National team caps and goals as of 15:55; 18 December 2024 (UTC)

Oskari Johannes Orevillo Kekkonen (born 24 September 1999) is a professional footballer who plays as a midfielder for Malaysian Super League club Sabah. Born in Finland, he plays for the Philippines national team.

== Club career ==
Born in Kotka, Finland, to a Filipino mother and a Finnish father, he made his first-team debut for KTP in 2016, at the age of 17. He then played for Sudet, FC Lahti, FC Kuusysi and PKKU.

On 21 July 2018, he re-joined KTP on loan from FC Lahti until the end of the season. In April 2019 it appeared from SJK Seinäjoki's website, that Kekkonen had become a part of the club's U20 squad. He returned to his childhood club, Peli-Karhut, in April 2019. In September 2019, Kekkonen joined PEPO Lappeenranta.

As of October 2021, he was signed with the Azkals Development Team of the Philippines Football League. In his first tournament with the club, they finished as runners-up of the 2021 Copa Paulino Alcantara. In January 2022 he moved to Kaya-Iloilo.

He returned to Finland with PK-35 for the 2023 season.

On 2 July 2023, he signed with Lamphun Warriors for the 2023–24 Thai League 1 Season.

Kekkonen joined Sabah for the 2026–27 Malaysia Super League season.

== International career ==
=== Finland U18 ===
Kekkonen played for Finland's under-18 team in the 2017 Baltic Cup. He came on as a 75th minute sub in their opening match where Finland defeated Latvia 4–0.

=== Philippines U23 ===
He then played for the Philippines under-23 team at the 2022 AFC U-23 Asian Cup qualifiers. He made his debut on 25 October 2021, coming on as a 33rd-minute substitute in their 3–0 loss to South Korea U23. Kekkonen was included in the 20-man squad for 31st Southeast Asian Games, which was held in Vietnam. Kekkonen scored his first goal for Philippines U23 in a 4–0 win against Timor-Leste.

=== Philippines ===
Kekkonen was named in the Philippines' squad for the 2020 AFF Championship. He made his senior international debut on 8 December 2021 as a substitute in their 2–1 loss to hosts Singapore.
