= Thiha Htet Aung =

Burmese footballer

Personal information
- Full name: Thiha Htet Aung
- Date of birth: 13 March 1996 (age 30)
- Place of birth: Manaung, Myanmar
- Height: 1.83 m (6 ft 0 in)
- Position: Center back

Team information
- Current team: Yadanarbon

Youth career
- 2012–2015: Zeyar Shwe Myay Youth Club

Senior career*
Years	Team	Apps	(Gls)
2015–2018	Yangon United	66	(0)
2017	Chin United (loan)	12	(0)
2018–2021	Zwegapin United	87	(0)
2022	Yangon United	15	(0)
2023-2024	Rakhine United	14	(1)
2025	Pattani	2	(0)
2026–	Yadanarbon	0	(0)

International career^{‡}
2013–2015	Myanmar U19	12	(0)
2017	Myanmar U22	10	(0)
2017–	Myanmar	18	(0)
- * Club domestic league appearances and goals as of 21 June 2026 ‡ National team caps and goals as of 22 October 2023

Thiha Htet Aung (Burmese: သီဟထက်အောင်; born 13 March 1996) is a Burmese professional footballer who plays as a center back for Myanmar National League club Yadanarbon.

== International goals and apps ==
As of match played 19 June 2023

=== Internationals goals and apps ===
– Internationals goals and apps
Team	Internationals	Goals	apps
Yangon United	AFC Champions League	0	1
Yangon United	AFC Champions League 2	0	5

– Internationals goals and apps
National Team	Internationals	Goals	apps
Myanmar U20	FIFA U20 World Cup	0	2

=== International ===
Appearances and goals by year
National team	Year	Apps	Goals
Myanmar	2017	6	0
Myanmar	2018	0	0
Myanmar	2019	0	0
Myanmar	2020	0	0
Myanmar	2021	0	0
Myanmar	2022	7	0
Myanmar	2023	5	0
Total		18	0

== Honours ==
- Tri-Nation Series

- Runners-up (1): 2023

- Hassanal Bolkiah Trophy: 2014
- 2015 Myanmar National League: Champion
