= Cahya Supriadi =

Indonesian footballer

Personal information
- Full name: Cahya Supriadi
- Date of birth: 11 February 2003 (age 23)
- Place of birth: Karawang, Indonesia
- Height: 1.80 m (5 ft 11 in)
- Position: Goalkeeper

Team information
- Current team: PSIM Yogyakarta
- Number: 19

Youth career
- 2018–2021: Persija Jakarta

Senior career*
Years	Team	Apps	(Gls)
2021–2024	Persija Jakarta	4	(0)
2024–2025	Bekasi City	16	(0)
2025–	PSIM Yogyakarta	32	(0)

International career^{‡}
2022–2023	Indonesia U20	16	(0)
2025	Indonesia U23	7	(0)
2024–	Indonesia	5	(0)
Medal record
Men's football
Representing Indonesia
FIFA Series
Runner-up	2026 Indonesia
ASEAN U-23 Championship
Runner-up	2025 Indonesia	Team
- * Club domestic league appearances and goals as of 22 May 2026 ‡ National team caps and goals as of 7 August 2026

Cahya Supriadi (born 11 February 2003) is an Indonesian professional footballer who plays as a goalkeeper for Super League club PSIM Yogyakarta and the Indonesia national team.

== Club career ==
=== Persija Jakarta ===
He was signed for Persija Jakarta to play in Liga 1 in the 2021–22 season. Cahya made his first-team debut on 15 April 2023 in a match against PSS Sleman at the Gelora Bung Karno Stadium, Jakarta.

== International career ==
On 30 May 2022, Cahya made his debut for an Indonesian youth team against a Venezuela U-20 squad in the 2022 Maurice Revello Tournament in France. In October 2022, it was reported that Cahya received a call-up from the Indonesia U-20 for a training camp, in Turkey and Spain. In January 2023, Cahya was called up by Shin Tae-Yong to the Indonesia under-20 team for the training centre in preparation for 2023 AFC U-20 Asian Cup.

On 25 November 2024, Cahya received a called up to the preliminary squad to the Indonesia national team for the 2024 ASEAN Championship. He made his debut against Myanmar in a 1–0 victory.

== Career statistics ==
=== International ===
As of match played 7 August 2026

Appearances and goals by national team and year
National team	Year	Apps	Goals
Indonesia	2024	3	0
Indonesia	2026	2	0
Total		5	0

== Honours ==
Indonesia U23

- ASEAN U-23 Championship runner-up: 2025

Individual

- Super League Save of the Month: August 2025
- Super League Assist of the Month: February 2026
