= Victor Dethan =

Indonesian footballer (born 2004)

- Dethan with Persija in 2026

Personal information
- Full name: Victor Jonson Benjamin Dethan
- Date of birth: 11 July 2004 (age 22)
- Place of birth: Kupang, Indonesia
- Height: 1.74 m (5 ft 9 in)
- Positions: Right winger; attacking midfielder

Team information
- Current team: Persija Jakarta
- Number: 7

Youth career
- 2019–2022: PSM Makassar

Senior career*
Years	Team	Apps	(Gls)
2022–2026	PSM Makassar	84	(6)
2026–	Persija Jakarta	6	(1)

International career^{‡}
2025–	Indonesia U23	3	(0)
2024–	Indonesia	4	(0)
Medal record
Men's football
Representing Indonesia
ASEAN U-23 Championship
Runner-up	2025 Indonesia	Team
- * Club domestic league appearances and goals as of 8 November 2026 ‡ National team caps and goals as of 10 October 2025

Victor Jonson Benjamin Dethan (born 11 July 2004) is an Indonesian professional footballer who plays as a right winger or attacking midfielder for Super League club Persija Jakarta and the Indonesia national team.

== Club career ==
=== PSM Makassar ===
Dethan was signed for PSM Makassar to play in Liga 1 in the 2022 season. He made his league debut on 23 July 2022 in a match against Bali United at the Gelora B.J. Habibie Stadium, Parepare.

On 9 February 2023, he came on as a substitute for Rizky Eka Pratama in the 64th minute and gave his first assist in a winning goal by Wiljan Pluim in PSM's 4–1 win over PS Barito Putera.

== International career ==
On 25 November 2024, Dethan received a called up to the preliminary squad to the Indonesia national team for the 2024 ASEAN Championship. He made his debut against Myanmar, coming on as a substitute in a 1–0 victory.

== Personal life ==
Dethan was born in Kupang, East Nusa Tenggara. He has Canadian descent from his mother who also was born in Canada, while his father is from Kupang.

== Career statistics ==
=== Club ===
As of 23 May 2026

Club	Season	League			Cup		Continental		Other		Total	
Club	Season	Division	Apps	Goals	Apps	Goals	Apps	Goals	Apps	Goals	Apps	Goals
PSM Makassar	2022–23	Liga 1	16	0	0	0	0	0	0	0	16	0
PSM Makassar	2023–24	Liga 1	19	1	0	0	3 (Note: Appearances in AFC Cup)	0	0	0	22	1
PSM Makassar	2024–25	Liga 1	25	3	0	0	–		8 (Note: Appearances in ASEAN Club Championship, Piala Presiden)	0	33	3
PSM Makassar	2025–26	Super League	24	2	0	0	–		0	0	24	2
Career total			84	6	0	0	3	0	8	0	95	6

=== International ===
As of match played 21 December 2024

Appearances and goals by national team and year
National team	Year	Apps	Goals
Indonesia	2024	4	0
Total		4	0

== Honours ==
PSM Makassar

- Liga 1: 2022–23

Indonesia U23

- ASEAN U-23 Championship runner-up: 2025
