= Ha Hyeok-jun =

South Korean football manager (born 1970)

Personal information
- Date of birth: 27 January 1970 (age 56)
- Place of birth: Busan, South Korea

Youth career
- 1989–1993: Dong-A University

Senior career*
Years	Team	Apps	(Gls)
1994-1995	Housing & Commercial Bank FC		

Managerial career
- 1998–2004: Osaka Korean High School
- 2005–?: Dong-eui University (Coach)
- 2011–2013: Myanmar (Assistant)
- 2015–2016: Beijing Enterprises (Assistant/Fitness)
- 2016–2017: Beijing Enterprises
- 2017: Jiangsu Suning (Fitness)
- 2017–2018: Suwon Samsung Bluewings (Fitness)
- 2019–2021: Daegu University
- 2023–2024: Resources Capital
- 2024–2026: Laos
- 2024–2026: Laos U-23
- * Club domestic league appearances and goals

Ha Hyeok-jun (Korean: 하혁준; born 27 January 1970) is a South Korean football manager and former player.

== Personal life ==
Ha holds a degree in English Language and Literature from Dong-A University. He is known to be multilingual, speaking Korean, English, Japanese, and Chinese.

Before fully committing to professional football coaching, Ha worked as a road manager for the famous South Korean actor Choi Min-soo for three years.

== Playing career ==
Born in Busan, Ha played for Dong-A High School and Dong-A University, where he was a close friend and teammate of future international Kim Tae-young. He began his professional career with Housing Bank FC. However, his playing career was cut short after just two years due to a severe injury involving a torn cartilage in his left knee.

== Managerial career ==
=== Early career ===
After retiring from playing, Ha transitioned into coaching and administration. From 2009 to 2011, he served as a full-time instructor for the Korea Football Association (KFA) Technical Education Department.

His international coaching career began in 2012 when he was appointed as the senior assistant coach for the Myanmar national football team and the U-23 team, serving until 2013.

=== China and South Korea ===
Ha spent several years coaching in China. He joined China League One side Beijing Enterprises in 2015, initially serving as a fitness and assistant coach. He was promoted to head coach of the club for the 2016–2017 season. Following this, he briefly served as the fitness coach for Chinese Super League club Jiangsu Suning in 2017.

Returning to South Korea, Ha worked as the fitness coach for the K League 1 giants Suwon Samsung Bluewings from 2017 to 2018. He later took up the role of head coach at Daegu University from 2019 to 2021.

=== Resources Capital ===
In 2023, Ha was appointed as the head coach of Resources Capital FC, a club competing in the Hong Kong Premier League.

=== Laos National Football Team ===
On 14 August 2024, the Lao Football Federation announced the appointment of Ha Hyeok-jun as the new head coach of the Laos national football team and the U-23 team on a two-year contract. He became the first South Korean manager in the history of the Laos national team. His primary objectives include the 2024 ASEAN Championshipand the qualifiers for the 2027 AFC Asian Cup.He made his managerial debut for Laos on 14 November 2024 in a friendly match against Malaysia.
