= Paul Tabinas =

Filipino footballer (born 2002)

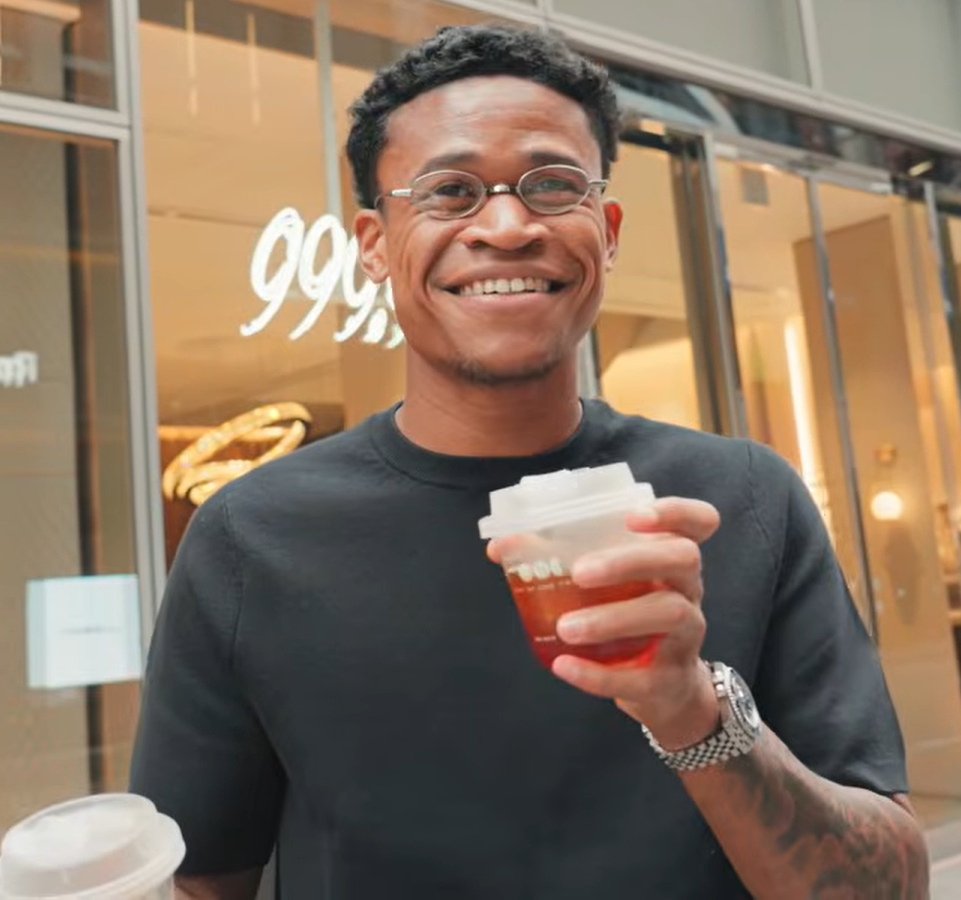

Personal information
- Full name: Paul Bismarck Tabinas
- Date of birth: 5 July 2002 (age 24)
- Place of birth: Shinjuku, Japan
- Height: 1.85 m (6 ft 1 in)
- Position: Right-back

Team information
- Current team: Dinamo Zagreb
- Number: 13

Youth career
- FC Waseda
- FC Toripletta
- 2018–2020: Aomori Yamada High School

Senior career*
Years	Team	Apps	(Gls)
2021–2022	Iwate Grulla Morioka	41	(2)
2023–2026	Vukovar 1991	50	(2)
2026–	Dinamo Zagreb	7	(0)

International career^{‡}
2022–	Philippines	24	(1)
- * Club domestic league appearances and goals as of 23:00, 22 August 2026 (UTC) ‡ National team caps and goals as of 21:15, 2 October 2026 (UTC)

Paul Bismarck Tabinas (Japanese: タビナス・ポール・ビスマルク; born 5 July 2002) is a professional footballer who plays as a right-back for Croatian HNL club Dinamo Zagreb. Born in Japan, he plays for the Philippines national team.

== Club career ==
Tabinas scored his first goal for Iwate Iwate Grulla Morioka in a 13–0 Emperor's Cup win over Oyama SC on 23 May 2021.

In February 2023, Tabinas joined Croatian club Vukovar 1991 on a contract that runs until 30 June 2026 after leaving Iwate Grulla Morioka at the end of the 2022 season.

On 15 January 2026, Tabinas was officially announced as a new signing for Croatian Prva HNL champions Dinamo Zagreb, having transferred from Vukovar 1991 for a reported fee of around €50,000. He was presented by Dinamo ahead of the second half of the 2025–26 season.

== International career ==
As his parents are a Ghanaian father and a Filipino mother, Tabinas is eligible to represent Ghana or the Philippines at international level. Despite being born in Japan, he is not eligible to represent the Japanese international team due to Japanese local rule.

In December 2022, he made his debut for the Philippines in a 1–0 friendly defeat against Vietnam.

Tabinas scored his first international goal on 9 June 2026 in a friendly against Myanmar at the Rizal Memorial Stadium.

== Personal life ==
He is the younger brother of fellow professional footballer Jefferson Tabinas.

== Career statistics ==
=== Club ===
As of 10 October 2026

Appearances and goals by club, season and competition
Club	Season	League			National cup		League cup		Other		Total	
Club	Season	Division	Apps	Goals	Apps	Goals	Apps	Goals	Apps	Goals	Apps	Goals
Iwate Grulla Morioka	2021	J3 League	15	1	1 (Note: Appearances in the Emperor's Cup)	1	–		0	0	16	2
Iwate Grulla Morioka	2022	J2 League	26	1	0	0	–		0	0	26	1
Iwate Grulla Morioka	Total		41	2	1	1	0	0	0	0	42	3
Vukovar 1991	2023–24	Prva NL	26	1	4	0	–		0	0	30	1
Vukovar 1991	2024–25	Prva NL	25	1	6	1	–		0	0	31	2
Vukovar 1991	2025–26	Prva HNL	6	0	1	0	–		0	0	7	0
Vukovar 1991	Total		57	2	11	1	0	0	0	0	68	3
Dinamo Zagreb	2025–26	Prva HNL	2	0	1	0	–		0	0	3	0
Dinamo Zagreb	2026–27	Prva HNL	5	0	1	0	–		1 (Note: One appearance in UEFA Champions League)	0	7	0
Dinamo Zagreb	Total		7	0	2	0	–		1	0	10	0
Career total			105	4	14	2	0	0	1	0	120	6

=== International ===
As of match played 2 October 2026

Appearances and goals by national team and year
National team	Year	Apps	Goals
Philippines	2022	1	0
Philippines	2023	0	0
Philippines	2024	15	0
Philippines	2025	3	0
Philippines	2026	5	1
Total		24	1

Scores and results list the Philippines' goal tally first.

#	Date	Venue	Opponent	Score	Result	Competition
1.	9 June 2026	Rizal Memorial Stadium, Manila, Philippines	Myanmar	2–0	5–1	Friendly
