= Soukphachan Lueanthala =

Laotian footballer (born 2002)

Personal information
- Date of birth: 24 August 2002 (age 24)
- Place of birth: Pakse, Laos
- Height: 1.73 m (5 ft 8 in)
- Positions: Forward; left winger

Youth career
- –2020: Champasak

Senior career*
Years	Team	Apps	(Gls)
2020–2021	Viengchanh	14	(4)
2022	Champasak	18	(8)
2023–2025	Master	28	(14)
2025–2026	Salavan United	17	(4)

International career^{‡}
2019–2020	Laos U19	3	(0)
2023	Laos U23	4	(0)
2022–	Laos	20	(0)
- * Club domestic league appearances and goals as of 23:49, 8 October 2026 (UTC) ‡ National team caps and goals as of 23:49, 8 October 2026 (UTC)

Soukphachan Lueanthala (Lao: ສຸກພະຈັນ ເລື່ອນທະລາ, born 24 August 2002) is a Laotian footballer who plays as a forward and left winger for the Laos national team.

== Career ==
In 2019, Soukphachan represented the Laos under-18 national team at the 2019 AFF U-18 Youth Championship. He later represented Laos's under-19 national team at the JENESYS 2019 Japan-ASEAN U-19 Men's Football Tournament in Japan, the under-22 national team at the 2023 SEA Games, and the under-23 national team at the 2023 AFF U-23 Championship.

He made his debut for the Laos national team on 21 December 2022, in a 6–0 defeat to Vietnam at the 2022 AFF Championship. He also played for Laos at the 2024 ASEAN Championship, as well as qualification for the 2026 FIFA World Cup and 2027 AFC Asian Cup.

=== 2026 ASEAN Championship and match-fixing allegations ===
On 5 June 2026, Soukphachan was included in Laos' preliminary squad for the 2026 ASEAN Championship, before later being called up on 24 July. He played in three matches during the group stage, including a 5–0 defeat to Thailand, a 4–0 defeat to Malaysia, and a 4–1 defeat to the Philippines.

On 7 August, the Lao Football Federation sent a formal request to the Ministry of Public Security to investigate the country's national team following the tournament, over the possibility of match-fixing and score manipulation. On 8 October 2026, The Guardian reported that Soukphachan had been arrested following allegations of organizing a match-fixing operation on behalf of a betting syndicate that was reported to be from Vietnam, and was suspected of giving instructions to members of the squad to fix matches.
