= Albert Capellas =

Spanish association football manager and former player

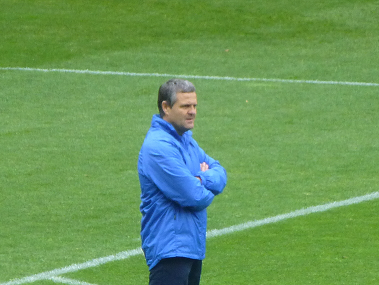
- Capellas with Vitesse in 2014

Personal information
- Full name: Albert Capellas Herms
- Date of birth: 1 October 1967 (age 59)
- Place of birth: Avinyó, Spain

Team information
- Current team: Philippines (manager)

Managerial career
- Years: Team
- 1991–1999: Gavà (assistant)
- 1999–2003: Barcelona B (assistant)
- 2004–2010: Barcelona B (academy)
- 2010–2014: Vitesse (assistant)
- 2014–2015: Brøndby (assistant)
- 2016: Brøndby U17
- 2016–2017: Maccabi Tel Aviv (assistant)
- 2017: Borussia Dortmund (assistant)
- 2018–2019: Chongqing Dangdai Lifan (assistant)
- 2019–2021: Denmark U21
- 2021: Barcelona B (interim)
- 2022–2023: Midtjylland
- 2024–2025: Philippines

Albert Capellas Herms (born 1 October 1967), is a Spanish football manager who is formerly the head coach of the Philippines national team.

== Managerial career ==
Capellas was born in Avinyó, Barcelona, Catalonia. After a modest career as a player, he joined Gavà in 1991 as assistant manager.

Capellas later joined the youth academy of Barcelona where he was the assistant manager of Barcelona B from 1999 to 2003, and then became the youth coordinator at Barcelona from 2004 until 2010.

In 2010, Capellas went to the Netherlands to be the assistant manager of Albert Ferrer at Vitesse during the 2010–2011 season. After Albert Ferrer's departure following poor results, he continued working for three more seasons at the Dutch side as the assistant coach of John van den Brom and Peter Bosz.

After leaving Vitesse in the summer of 2014, he went to Denmark to work as an assistant to Thomas Frank at Brøndby between 2014 and 2015. In addition, he became the manager of the U-17 team in 2016.

In July 2016, Capellas reunited with Peter Bosz and worked under him as an assistant manager at Israeli Premier League club Maccabi Tel Aviv.

On 6 June 2017, Peter Bosz bring in Capellas as an assistant manager at Borussia Dortmund. Both would be sacked in December 2017 after a series of poor results.

In the summer of 2018, Capellas was hired as Jordi Cruyff's assistant at Chongqing Dangdai Lifan in the Chinese Super League, where he would stay until the end of the season. Working together, the two managed to save Chongqing's status in the top flight of the Chinese Super League.

In June 2019, Capellas signed a contract with the Danish Football Federation to become the manager of the Denmark U21 national team. On 16 October 2020 after a 2–1 victory over Finland, Denmark qualified for the 2021 UEFA European Under-21 Championship with good results.

Following the dismissal of Ronald Koeman as Barcelona manager and the appointment of Sergi Barjuán as interim manager, Capellas was chosen as interim manager of Barcelona B during Sergi's absence.

On 24 August 2022, Capellas was named as the new manager of Danish Superliga side Midtjylland on at contract running until 2025. He was sacked on 14 March 2023, with the club in ninth place in the Danish Superliga.

Capellas first joined the Philippine national team at the 2024 Merdeka Tournament under interim coach Norman Fegidero. After the tournament, he was officially announced as the new head coach on 10 September 2024. As of 31 May 2025, Capellas has stepped down as head coach, due to personal reasons.

== Managerial statistics ==
As of match played 25 March 2025

Managerial record by team and tenure
| Team | Nat | From | To | Record | | | | | | | |
| Team | Nat | From | To | G | W | D | L | GF | GA | GD | Win % |
|---|---|---|---|---|---|---|---|---|---|---|---|
| Denmark U21 | (Denmark) | 1 August 2019 | 30 June 2021 | 16 | 12 | 4 | 0 | 32 | 12 | +20 | 75.00 |
| Barcelona B (interim) | (Spain) | 28 October 2021 | 7 November 2021 | 2 | 2 | 0 | 0 | 6 | 1 | +5 | 100.00 |
| Midtjylland | (Denmark) | 24 August 2022 | 14 March 2023 | 25 | 8 | 9 | 8 | 36 | 29 | +7 | 32.00 |
| Philippines | (Philippines) | 10 September 2024 | 31 May 2025 | 10 | 4 | 3 | 3 | 16 | 14 | +2 | 40.00 |
| Career Total | | | | 53 | 26 | 16 | 11 | 90 | 56 | +34 | 49.06 |
