= Myanmar national football team results (2020–present) =

This article provides details of international football games played by the Myanmar national football team from 2020 to present.

== Results ==
Key
| Win |
| Draw |
| Defeat |

=== 2020 ===
| 14 February 2020 Friendly | Myanmar | Cancelled | Oman | Yangon, Myanmar |
| | | Report | | Stadium: Thuwunna Stadium |

| 7 March 2020 Friendly | Bahrain | Cancelled | Myanmar | Riffa, Bahrain |
| | | Report | | Stadium: Bahrain National Stadium |

=== 2021 ===
| 28 May 2021 2022 World Cup qualification | Japan | 10–0 | Myanmar | Chiba, Japan |
| 19:30 UTC+9 | Minamino 8', 66'; Osako 22', 30' (pen.), 36', 49', 88'; Morita 56'; Kamada 84'; Itakura 90' | Report | | Stadium: Fukuda Denshi Arena; Referee: Hasan Akrami (Iran) |

| 11 June 2021 2022 World Cup qualification | Myanmar | 1–8 | Kyrgyzstan | Osaka, Japan |
| 16:00 UTC+9 | Hlaing Bo Bo 69' | Report | Rustamov 22'; Alykulov 29'; Musabekov 34'; Shukurov 45'; Murzaev 45+2', 61', 78'; Bokoleyev 63' | Stadium: Yanmar Stadium Nagai; Referee: Hussein Abou Yehya (Lebanon) |

| 15 June 2021 2022 World Cup qualification | Tajikistan | 4–0 | Myanmar | Osaka, Japan |
| 19:25 UTC+9 | Tursunov 34'; Dzhalilov 53'; Boboev 78'; Samiev 87' | Report | | Stadium: Yanmar Stadium Nagai; Referee: Omar Mohamed Al-Ali (United Arab Emirates) |

| 13 November 2021 Friendly | Burundi | 2–1 | Myanmar | Manavgat, Turkey |
| | Bigirimana 78'; Ntibazonkiza 81' (pen.) | Report | Suan Lam Mang 28' | Stadium: Arslan Zeki Demirci Spor Kompleksi |

| 25 November 2021 Friendly | Indonesia | 4–1 | Myanmar | Antalya, Turkey |
| 17:30 UTC+3 | Kambuaya 5'; Irfan 12'; Witan 33'; Ezra 55' (pen.) | Report | M.M.Lwin 73' | Stadium: Emirhan Sports Complex |

| 5 December 2021 AFF Championship | Singapore | 3–0 | Myanmar | Kallang, Singapore |
| 20:45 UTC+8 | Baharudin 34'; Fandi 39', 45+1' | Report | | Stadium: National Stadium; Referee: Ahmed Faisal Mohammad Al Ali (Jordan) |

| 8 December 2021 AFF Championship | Myanmar | 2–0 | Timor-Leste | Kallang, Singapore |
| 17:30 UTC+8 | Than Paing 16'; Maung Maung Lwin 50' | Report | | Stadium: National Stadium; Referee: Saoud Ali Al-Adba (Qatar) |

| 11 December 2021 AFF Championship | Thailand | 4–0 | Myanmar | Kallang, Singapore |
| 20:30 UTC+8 | Teerasil 23', 53' (pen.); Worachit 78'; Supachok 90+2' | Report | | Stadium: National Stadium; Referee: Shukri Hussain Al-Alhunfush (Saudi Arabia) |

| 18 December 2021 AFF Championship | Myanmar | 2–3 | Philippines | Bishan, Singapore |
| 20:30 UTC+8 | Htet Phyo Wai 74', 86' | Report | Marañón 16', 19', 45' | Stadium: Bishan Stadium; Referee: Mohammed Al-Hoaish (Saudi Arabia) |

=== 2022 ===
| 27 May 2022 Friendly | Myanmar | 0–2 | Bahrain | Pathum Thani, Thailand |
| 19:00 UTC+7 | | Report | Abduljabbar 89' (pen.); Al-Humaidan 90+1' | Stadium: BG Stadium |

| 8 June 2022 2023 Asian Cup qualification | Tajikistan | 4–0 | Myanmar | Bishkek, Kyrgyzstan |
| 16:30 UTC+6 | Mabatshoev 9', 57'; Dzhalilov 56' (pen.); Panjshanbe 84' | Report | | Stadium: Dolen Omurzakov Stadium; Attendance: 50; Referee: Ammar Mahfoodh (Bahrain) |

| 11 June 2022 2023 Asian Cup qualification | Myanmar | 0–2 | Kyrgyzstan | Bishkek, Kyrgyzstan |
| 21:00 UTC+6 | | Report | Maier 25', 45' | Stadium: Dolen Omurzakov Stadium; Attendance: 7,522; Referee: Rowan Arumughan (India) |

| 14 June 2022 2023 Asian Cup qualification | Myanmar | 2–6 | Singapore | Bishkek, Kyrgyzstan |
| 16:30 UTC+6 | Win Naing Tun 53'; Aung Kaung Mann 66' | Report | Ikhsan 9', 54', 69'; Song Ui-young 16'; Quak 42'; Hafiz 89' | Stadium: Dolen Omurzakov Stadium; Attendance: 0 Referee: Bijan Heydari (Iran) |

| 21 September 2022 Friendly | Hong Kong | 2–0 | Myanmar | Mong Kok, Hong Kong |
| 20:00 UTC+8 | Sun Ming Him 34'; Law Tsz Chun 35' | | | Stadium: Mong Kok Stadium; Attendance: 0 Referee: Sultan Mohamed Saleh Yousif Al-Hammadi (United Arab Emirates) |

| 24 September 2022 Friendly | Hong Kong | 0–0 | Myanmar | So Kon Po, Hong Kong |
| 20:00 UTC+8 | | | | Stadium: Hong Kong Stadium; Attendance: 12,264; Referee: Jumpei Iida (Japan) |

| 11 December 2022 Friendly | Thailand | 6–0 | Myanmar | Pathum Thani, Thailand |
| | Teerasil 12' (pen.), 58'; Bordin 29'; Nanda Kyaw 45' (o.g.); Sarach 45+3'; Nyein Chan 75' (o.g.) | | | Stadium: Thammasat Stadium |

| 21 December 2022 AFF Championship | Myanmar | 0–1 | Malaysia | Yangon, Myanmar |
| 16:30 UTC+6:30 | | Report | Faisal 52' | Stadium: Thuwunna Stadium; Attendance: 4,500; Referee: Ahmed Faisal Al Ali (Jordan) |

| 24 December 2022 AFF Championship | Singapore | 3–2 | Myanmar | Kallang, Singapore |
| 18:00 UTC+8 | Ilhan 45'; Shah 49'; Shawal 74' | Report | Maung Maung Lwin 34', 66' | Stadium: Jalan Besar Stadium; Attendance: 5,370; Referee: Kim Jong-hyeok (South Korea) |

| 30 December 2022 AFF Championship | Myanmar | 2–2 | Laos | Yangon, Myanmar |
| 16:30 UTC+6:30 | Kyaw Min Oo 15'; Maung Maung Lwin 90+6' | Report | Soukaphone 12'; Ekkamai 46' | Stadium: Thuwunna Stadium; Attendance: 4,100; Referee: Aziz Asimov (Uzbekistan) |

=== 2023 ===
| 3 January 2023 AFF Championship | Vietnam | 3–0 | Myanmar | Hanoi, Vietnam |
| 19:30 UTC+7 | Kyaw Zin Lwin 8' (o.g.); Nguyễn Tiến Linh 27'; Châu Ngọc Quang 72' | Report | | Stadium: Mỹ Đình National Stadium; Referee: Choi Hyun-jai (South Korea) |

| 22 March 2023 2023 Tri-Nation Series | India | 1–0 | Myanmar | Imphal, India |
| 18:00 UTC+5:30 | Thapa 45+1' | Report | | Stadium: Khuman Lampak Main Stadium; Attendance: 29,431; Referee: Md Alamgir Sarker (Bangladesh) |

| 25 March 2023 2023 Tri-Nation Series | Myanmar | 1–1 | Kyrgyzstan | Imphal, India |
| --:-- UTC+5:30 | Aung Thu 82' | Report | Zhyrgalbek uulu 90+6' | Stadium: Khuman Lampak Main Stadium; Attendance: 9,563; Referee: Nasir Uddin (Bangladesh) |

| 16 June 2023 Friendly | China | 4–0 | Myanmar | Dalian, China |
| 18:30 UTC+8 | Zhang Linpeng 29'; Lin Liangming 35'; Wu Lei 75', 81' | Report | | Stadium: Dalian Barracuda Bay Football Stadium; Attendance: 27,651; Referee: Tanimoto Ryo (Japan) |

| 19 June 2023 Friendly | Myanmar | 2–0 | Macau | Dalian, China |
| --:-- | Lwin Moe Aung 23'; Maung Maung Lwin 90+4' | Report | | Stadium: Dalian Pro Soccer Academy Base Stadium |

| 12 October 2023 Friendly | Myanmar | 5–1 | Macau | Yangon, Myanmar |
| --:-- | Lwin Moe Aung 39', 90+5'; Soe Moe Kyaw 62'; Aung Kaung Mann 81'; Nay Moe Naing 90+1' | Report | Niki Torrao 55' | Stadium: Thuwunna Stadium; Attendance: 6,213; Referee: Pranjal Banerjee |

| 17 October 2023 Friendly | Macau | 0–0 | Myanmar | Taipa, Macau |
| --:-- | | Report | | Stadium: Macau Olympic Stadium; Attendance: 2187; Referee: Mahmood Salim Said Al-Majarafi |

| 16 November 2026 WCQ R2 / 2027 ACQ | Japan | 5–0 | Myanmar | Suita, Japan |
| 16:30 UTC+6:30 | Ueda 11', 45+4', 50'; Kamada 28'; Dôan 86' | Report | | Stadium: Panasonic Stadium Suita; Attendance: 34,484; Referee: Muhammad Taqi (Singapore) |

| 21 November 2026 WCQ R2 / 2027 ACQ | Myanmar | 1–6 | North Korea | Yangon, Myanmar |
| 16:00 UTC+6:30 | Win Naing Tun 77' | Report | Jong Il-gwan 30', 54', 56'; Choe Ju-song 34' (pen.); Han Kwang-song 38'; Ri Hyong-jin 70' | Stadium: Thuwunna Stadium; Referee: Ilgiz Tantashev (Uzbekistan) |

=== 2024 ===
| 16 January Training match | Myanmar | 4–2 | (Myanmar) Thitsar Arman | Yangon, Myanmar |
| | Maung Maung Lwin; Thet Hein Soe; Nyein Chan | | Pyae Sone Aung | Stadium: Thuwunna Stadium |

| 20 January Training match | Myanmar | 4–2 | (Myanmar) Myawady | Yangon, Myanmar |
| | Myat Kaung Khant; Maung Maung Lwin; Wai Lin Aung | | Htet Lin Aung; Kaung Sithu | Stadium: Thuwunna Stadium |

| 31 January Training match | Myanmar | 1–1 | (Myanmar) ISPE | Yangon, Myanmar |
| | Hein Htet Aung | | Thein Zaw Thiha | Stadium: Thuwunna Stadium |

| 21 March 2026 World Cup qualification | Myanmar | 1–1 | Syria | Yangon, Myanmar |
| 18:00 UTC+6:30 | Soe Moe Kyaw 35' | Report (FIFA); Report (AFC) | Al-Dali 71' | Stadium: Thuwunna Stadium; Attendance: 7,580; Referee: Hassan Akrami (Iran) |

| 26 March 2026 World Cup qualification | Syria | 7–0 | Myanmar | Dammam, Saudi Arabia |
| 22:00 UTC+3 | Khribin 30', 54', 63' (pen.); Hesar 47'; Ajan 51', 68'; Al-Dali 80' | Report (FIFA); Report (AFC) | | Stadium: Prince Mohamed bin Fahd Stadium; Attendance: 3,252; Referee: Pranjal Banerjee (India) |

| 6 June 2026 World Cup qualification | Myanmar | 0–5 | Japan | Yangon, Myanmar |
| 18:40 UTC+6:30 | | Report (FIFA); Report (AFC) | Nakamura 17', 90+3'; Dōan 37'; Ogawa 75', 83' | Stadium: Thuwunna Stadium; Attendance: 21,200; Referee: Majed Al-Shamrani (Saudi Arabia) |

| 11 June 2026 World Cup qualification | North Korea | 4–1 | Myanmar | Vientiane, Laos |
| 20:00 UTC+7 | Ri Il-song 12'; Ri Jo-guk 16', 43', 87' (pen.) | Report (FIFA); Report (AFC) | Wai Lin Aung 57' | Stadium: New Laos National Stadium; Attendance: 141; Referee: Shen Yinhao (China) |

| 10 October Friendly | Myanmar | 2–0 | Sri Lanka | Yangon, Myanmar |
| 16:00 UTC+6:30 | L. M. Aung 16'*M. Mg Lwin 53' | | | Stadium: Thuwunna Stadium; Referee: Souei Vongkham(Lao) |

| 13 October Friendly | Myanmar | 0–0 | Sri Lanka | Yangon, Myanmar |
| | | | | Stadium: Thuwunna Stadium |

| November Friendly | Singapore | 3–2 | Myanmar | Kallang, Singapore |
| 19:30 UTC+8 | Farhan Zulkifli 5'; Shawal Anuar 84'; Naqiuddin Eunos 86' | | Ye Yint Aung 46'; Thiha Zaw 51' | Stadium: National Stadium |

| 19 November Friendly | Myanmar | 2–3 | Lebanon | Yangon, Myanmar |
| | | | | Stadium: Thuwunna Stadium |

| 24 November 2024 ASEAN Championship | Myanmar | 0–1 | Indonesia | Yangon, Myanmar |
| | | | | Stadium: Thuwunna Stadium |

| 12 December 2024 ASEAN Championship | Philippines | 1–1 | Myanmar | Bocaue, Philippines |
| | | | | Stadium: Philippine Sports Stadium |

| 15 December 2024 ASEAN Championship | Myanmar | 3–2 | Laos | Yangon, Myanmar |
| | | | | Stadium: Thuwunna Stadium |

| 21 December 2024 ASEAN Championship | Vietnam | 5–0 | Myanmar | Hanoi, Vietnam |
| | | | | Stadium: Mỹ Đình National Stadium |

=== 2025 ===
| 25 March 2027 AFC Asian Cup qualification | Myanmar | 2–1 | Afghanistan | Yangon, Myanmar |
| 17:00 UTC+6:30 | Than Paing 28'; Maung Maung Lwin 75' | Report; Report (AFC) | Popalzay 14' | Stadium: Thuwunna Stadium; Attendance: 6,500; Referee: Yahya Al-Balushi (Oman) |

| 10 June 2027 AFC Asian Cup qualification | Myanmar | 1–0 | Pakistan | Yangon, Myanmar |
| 17:00 UTC+6:30 | Than Paing 42' | Report; Report (AFC) | | Stadium: Thuwunna Stadium; Attendance: 22,000; Referee: Zhang Lei (China) |

| 9 September Closed-doors Friendly^{1} | Singapore | 1–1 | Myanmar | Kallang, Singapore |
| 21:00 UTC+8 | Ilhan Fandi 90' | Report | Thet Hein Soe 60' | Stadium: Jalan Besar Stadium; Attendance: 0 |

| 9 October 2027 AFC Asian Cup qualification | Syria | 5–1 | Myanmar | Hofuf, Saudi Arabia |
| 19:15 UTC+3 | Khribin 6', 19', 71' (pen.); Alsalkhadi 29'; Al Hallaq 89' | Report; Report (AFC) | Nanda Kyaw 90+1' | Stadium: Prince Abdullah bin Jalawi Stadium; Attendance: 198; Referee: Mohammad Mofeed (Jordan) |

| 14 October 2027 AFC Asian Cup qualification | Myanmar | 0–3 | Syria | Yangon, Myanmar |
| 17:00 UTC+6:30 | | Report; Report (AFC) | Sabbag 79', 85'; Alsalkhadi 87' | Stadium: Thuwunna Stadium; Attendance: 22,000; Referee: Zhang Lei (China) |

=== 2026 ===
| 26 March 2027 AFC Asian Cup qualification | Afghanistan | 1–2 | Myanmar | Yangon, Myanmar |
| 17:00 UTC+6:30 | Popalzay 10' | Report; Report (AFC) | Than Paing 45'; Khun Kyaw Zin Hein 73' | Stadium: Thuwunna Stadium; Attendance: 1,760; Referee: Ngô Duy Lân (Vietnam) |

| 31 March 2027 AFC Asian Cup qualification | Pakistan | 1–2 | Myanmar | Islamabad, Pakistan |
| 18:30 UTC+3 | Shayak Dost 90' | Report; Report (AFC) | Saqib Hanif 46' (o.g.); Than Paing 59' | Stadium: Jinnah Sports Stadium; Referee: Firdavs Norsafarov (Uzbekistan) |

| 6 June Friendly | Guam | 1–6 | Myanmar | Manila, Philippines |
| 19:30 UTC+8 | J. Gomez 90+1' (pen.) | | Soe Moe Kyaw 13'; Maung Maung Lwin 23'; Win Naing Tun 35', 53'; Zaw Win Thein 57'; Shine Wanna Aung 86' | Stadium: Rizal Memorial Stadium; Referee: Nawal Zubir (Malaysia) |

| 9 June Friendly | Philippines | 5–1 | Myanmar | Manila, Philippines |
| 19:30 UTC+8 | J. Tabinas 45+1'; P. Tabinas 54'; Rasmussen 80', 90+1'; Leipold 88' | | Win Naing Tun 82' | Stadium: Rizal Memorial Stadium; Attendance: 4,662; Referee: Songkran Bunmeekiart (Thailand) |

| 18 July Friendly | Vietnam | 4–0 | Myanmar | Thái Nguyên, Vietnam |
| 19:00 UTC+7 | Nguyễn Xuân Son 5'; Phạm Xuân Mạnh 39'; Đỗ Hoàng Hên 59'; Nguyễn Đình Bắc 90+1' (pen.) | | | Stadium: Thái Nguyên Stadium; Referee: Torphong Somsing (Thailand) |

| 25 July 2026 ASEAN Championship Group B | Myanmar | 1–2 | Malaysia | Yangon, Myanmar |
| 16:30 UTC+6:30 | Myat Kaung Khant 9' | Report | Josué 52', 57' (pen.) | Stadium: Thuwunna Stadium; Referee: Yusuke Ohashi (Japan) |

| 28 July 2026 ASEAN Championship Group B | Philippines | 1–4 | Myanmar | Capas, Philippines |
| 18:00 UTC+8 | Gayoso 68' | Report | Kyaw Min Oo 45+1'; Than Paing 28', 83'; Win Naing Tun 81' | Stadium: New Clark City Athletics Stadium; Attendance: 3,104; Referee: Jin Jingyuan (China) |

| 4 August 2026 ASEAN Championship Group B | Myanmar | 7–2 | Laos | Yangon, Myanmar |
| 16:30 UTC+6:30 | Lwin Moe Aung 2'; Win Naing Tun 20', 41', 83'; Maung Maung Lwin 45+6'(P); Than Paing 52'; Hein Htet Aung 81' | Report | Chernvanglien 17'; Puttthavong 23' | Stadium: Thuwunna Stadium; Referee: Alimardon Bainazarov (Kyrgyzstan) |

| 8 August 2026 ASEAN Championship Group B | Thailand | 2–0 | Myanmar | Bangkok, Thailand |
| 20:00 UTC+7 | Worachit 11' (pen.); Jehhanafee 52' (pen.) | Report | | Stadium: Rajamangala Stadium; Attendance: 13,026; Referee: Yusuke Ohashi (Japan) |

== Head-to-head records ==
Myanmar national football team head-to-head records (2020–present)
| Opponent | Pld | W | D | L | GF | GA | GD | Pts | Confederation |
|---|---|---|---|---|---|---|---|---|---|
| Afghanistan | 2 | 2 | 0 | 0 | 4 | 2 | +2 | 6 | AFC |
| Bahrain | 1 | 0 | 0 | 1 | 0 | 2 | –2 | 0 | AFC |
| Burundi | 1 | 0 | 0 | 1 | 1 | 2 | –1 | 0 | CAF |
| China | 1 | 0 | 0 | 1 | 0 | 4 | –4 | 0 | AFC |
| Guam | 1 | 1 | 0 | 0 | 6 | 1 | +5 | 3 | AFC |
| Hong Kong | 2 | 0 | 1 | 1 | 0 | 2 | –2 | 1 | AFC |
| India | 1 | 0 | 0 | 1 | 0 | 1 | –1 | 0 | AFC |
| Indonesia | 2 | 0 | 0 | 2 | 1 | 5 | –4 | 0 | AFC |
| Japan | 3 | 0 | 0 | 3 | 0 | 20 | –20 | 0 | AFC |
| Kyrgyzstan | 3 | 0 | 1 | 2 | 2 | 11 | –9 | 1 | AFC |
| Laos | 3 | 2 | 1 | 0 | 12 | 6 | +6 | 7 | AFC |
| Lebanon | 1 | 0 | 0 | 1 | 2 | 3 | –1 | 0 | AFC |
| Macau | 3 | 2 | 1 | 0 | 7 | 1 | +6 | 7 | AFC |
| Malaysia | 2 | 0 | 0 | 2 | 1 | 3 | –2 | 0 | AFC |
| North Korea | 2 | 0 | 0 | 2 | 2 | 10 | –8 | 0 | AFC |
| Pakistan | 2 | 2 | 0 | 0 | 3 | 1 | +2 | 6 | AFC |
| Philippines | 4 | 1 | 1 | 2 | 8 | 10 | –2 | 4 | AFC |
| Singapore | 4 | 0 | 0 | 4 | 6 | 15 | –9 | 0 | AFC |
| Sri Lanka | 2 | 1 | 1 | 0 | 2 | 0 | +2 | 4 | AFC |
| Syria | 4 | 0 | 1 | 3 | 2 | 16 | –14 | 1 | AFC |
| Tajikistan | 2 | 0 | 0 | 2 | 0 | 8 | –8 | 0 | AFC |
| Thailand | 3 | 0 | 0 | 3 | 0 | 12 | –12 | 0 | AFC |
| Timor-Leste | 1 | 1 | 0 | 0 | 2 | 0 | +2 | 3 | AFC |
| Vietnam | 3 | 0 | 0 | 3 | 0 | 12 | –12 | 0 | AFC |

== See also ==
- Myanmar national football team
- Myanmar national football team results (1950–1999)
- Myanmar national football team results (2000–2009)
- Myanmar national football team results (2010–2019)
