= 2025–26 MNL-2 =

MNL-2
- Season: 2025–26
- Dates: 3 August 2025– 29 January 2026
- Champions: Chinland
- Promoted: Chinland; Myawady
- Relegated: Young Boys United; Silver Stars
- Matches: 56
- Goals: 236 (4.21 per match)
- Top goalscorer: Hla Phone Oo (22 goals)
- Best goalkeeper: Kaung Htet Kyaw; Leopold Kamguia (4 matches)
- Biggest home win: Chinland F.C. 13-1 Young Boys United; 9 January 2026
- Biggest away win: Young Boys United 0-8 Yangon City; 4 September 2025
- Highest scoring: Chinland F.C. 13-1 Young Boys United; 9 January 2026
- Longest winning run: Yangon City (8 matches)
- Longest unbeaten run: Yangon City (8 matches)
- Longest winless run: Young Boys United (10 matches)
- Longest losing run: Young Boys United (10 matches)

The 2025–26 Myanmar National League Two, is the 13th season of the MNL-2, the second division league for football clubs in Myanmar since its founding in 2012. The champion and 2nd placed team will promote to the Myanmar National League. 2 teams from the bottom will relegate to the MNL2 Amateur tournament. The league has a total of 9 teams.

== Teams ==
The upcoming 2025–26 Myanmar National League Two (MNL-2) season features Chinland F.C., Glory Goal, Kachin United F.C., Myawady F.C., Rakhine United Reserves, Silver Stars F.C., University F.C., Yangon Royals, and Young Boy United — with the latter two promoted via the Amateur Promotion Festival in early 2025. After initial group stages, the top two clubs face off in a final — with finalists earning promotion to the top-tier MNL and qualification to the General Aung San Shield. Prize money for the 2025 campaign has been confirmed at Ks 13 million for champions, Ks 10 million for runners-up, and Ks 7 million for third place.

== Personnel and sponsoring ==
Note: Flags indicate national team as has been defined under FIFA eligibility rules. Players may hold more than one non-FIFA nationality.

Team	Head coach	Captain	Kit manufacturer	Shirt sponsor
Chinland	(Myanmar) U KB Siang Cung Lian	(Myanmar) Tint Aung Kyaw	(Myanmar) Versus	Myanmar Flower
Glory Goal	(Myanmar) U Myat Tun	(Myanmar) Zar Chi Maung	(Myanmar) Rhino Sports	(Myanmar) Glory Goal Construction
Kachin United	(Myanmar) U Soe Thein	(Myanmar) Ye Yint Aung	(Myanmar) Ronin Sport	(Myanmar) Ronin Sport
Myawady	(Myanmar) U Min Kyi	(Myanmar) Naing Zin Htet	(Myanmar) M21 Sport	
Silver Stars	(Myanmar) U Shwe Tun	(Myanmar) Nyi Nyi Tun	(Myanmar) Pro Sport	(Myanmar) VBT 77
University	(Myanmar) U Zaw Min	(Myanmar) Aung Myint Myat	(Myanmar) Fit	
Yangon City	(Myanmar) U Aung Naing	(Myanmar) Sithu Aung	(Myanmar) M21 Sport	
Young Boys United	(Myanmar) U Tin Nyein	(Myanmar) Phyo Chit	(Myanmar) Fit	

== League table ==
Pos	Team	Pld	W	D	L	GF	GA	GD	Pts	Promotion or relegation
1	Chinland (C),(P)	14	10	2	2	51	17	+34	32	2026-2027 Myanmar National League
2	Myawady (P)	14	9	3	2	36	12	+24	30	2026-2027 Myanmar National League
3	Yangon City (P)^{1}	14	7	5	2	40	14	+26	26	2026-2027 Myanmar National League
4	University	14	7	2	5	28	24	+4	23	
5	Kachin Utd	14	5	5	4	26	19	+7	20	
6	Glory Goal	14	5	3	6	26	20	+6	18	
7	Young Boys United	14	2	0	12	15	71	−56	6	
8	Silver Stars	14	1	0	13	14	59	−45	3	

Updated to match(es) played on 28 January 2026. Source:
- (C) = Champions
- (P) = promoted to 2026-27 Myanmar National League.
- ^{1} Yangon City was promoted because Dagon Port F.C. (who finished 10th in the previous MNL season) dissolved.

== Matches ==
=== Week 1 ===
3 August 2025	Silver Star	0-5	Myawady	Padonmar Stadium, Yangon
15:30 UTC+06:30			Myat Min Oo 55'; Naing Zin Htet 68', 82'; Lan San Aung 88', 90'

3 August 2025	University	0-0	Kachin United	University Stadium, Yangon
15:30 UTC+06:30

4 August 2025	Yangon City	2-1	Glory Goal	Padonmar Stadium, Yangon
15:30 UTC+06:30	Sithu Aung 4'; Hein Htet Sithu 32'		Aung Phyo Min 40'

4 August 2025	Young Boys United	0-3	Chinland	Padonmar Stadium, Yangon
15:30 UTC+06:30			Hla Phone Oo 7', 59'; Tint Aung Kyaw 27'

=== Week 2 ===
9 August 2025	University	4-1	Silver Star	University Stadium, Yangon
15:30 UTC+06:30	Aung Myint Myat 10', 61' (pen.), 90+2'; Hlaing Zaw Htet 76'		Thet Aung 18'

9 August 2025	Gloray Goal	1-1	Myawady	Padonmar Stadium, Yangon
15:30 UTC+06:30	Hein Htet Aung 45'		Thiha Zaw (1) 13'

10 August 2025	Yangon City	1-2	Chinland	University Stadium, Yangon
15:30 UTC+06:30	Yaw Kusi 83'		Hein Thet Phyo 51'; Hla Phone Oo 90+1'

10 August 2025	Kachin United	4-0	Young Boys United	Padonmar Stadium, Yangon
15:30 UTC+06:30	Sai Aung 43', 53'; Thet Paing Soe 48'; Chit Htwe 76'

=== Week 3 ===
28 August 2025	Chinland	2-3	Myawady	University Stadium, Yangon
15:30 UTC+06:30	Hein Thet Phyo 24'; Telesphore Doua 54'		Kaung Hte Lin 76', 90'; Ye Pyae Naung 90+2'

28 August 2025	Gloray Goal	1-1	Kachin United	Padonmar Stadium, Yangon
15:30 UTC+06:30	Thein Toe Aung 65'		Chit Htwe 90+2'

29 August 2025	University	7-3	Young Boys United	University Stadium, Yangon
15:30 UTC+06:30	Zin Myo Aung 8', 51', 71', 81'; Aung Myint Myat 45+1', 80'; Hlaing Zaw Htet 64'		Aung Ko Naing 78'; Htet Myat Ko 53', 67'

29 August 2025	Silver Stars	1-3	Yangon City	Padonmar Stadium, Yangon
15:30 UTC+06:30	That Win Tun 19'		Boateng 8'; Kyaw Zin Lwin 45+3'; Sithu Aung 57'

=== Week 4 ===
6 September 2025	University	1-0	Glory Goal	University Stadium, Yangon
15:30 UTC+06:30	Aung Myint Myat 18' (pen.)

6 September 2025	Chinland	2-0	Silver Stars	Padonmar Stadium, Yangon
15:30 UTC+06:30	Hla Phone Oo 11'; Pato 68'

7 September 2025	Young Boys United	0-8	Yangon City	University Stadium, Yangon
15:30 UTC+06:30			Htet Myat Lwin 2'; Moubarak Ben Hamdallah 18', 26', 32'; Sithu Aung 21', 38'; Yaw Kusi 45'; Myo Sett Aung 65'

8 September 2025	Kachin United	0-1	Myawady	University Stadium, Yangon
15:30 UTC+06:30			Htet Lin Aung 12'

=== Week 5 ===
11 September 2025	Yangon City	1-1	University	University Stadium, Yangon
15:30 UTC+06:30	Moubarak 69'		Aung Win Khant 47'

23 September 2025	Chinland	5-2	Kachin United	University Stadium, Yangon
15:30 UTC+06:30	Hla Phone Oo 31', 90', 90+5' (pen.); Pato 59'; Doua 82'		Hkum 34'; Bhone Khant Aung 63'

24 September 2025	Glory Goals	4-2	Silver Stars	University Stadium, Yangon
15:30 UTC+06:30	Zaw Phyo Aung 45+1'; Hein Htet Aung 52'; Pejei 81'; Messomo 90+4'		Thet Win Tun 2'; Thet Aung 20'

25 September 2025	Myawady	6-0	Young Boys United	University Stadium, Yangon
15:30 UTC+06:30	Soe Thet Maung 22', 72'; Thiha Zaw (1) 47', 85'; Thiha Zaw (2) 71'; Min Min Khant 75'

=== Week 6 ===
5 October 2025	Glory Goals	1-1	Chinland	University Stadium, Yangon
15:30 UTC+06:30	Hein Htet Aung 6'		Hein Thet Phyo 53'

7 October 2025	Myawady	5-0	University	University Stadium, Yangon
15:30 UTC+06:30	Thiha Zaw 2', 27'; Kaung Htet Lin 36'; Soe Thet Maung 67', 83'; Htet Lin Aung 87'

8 October 2025	Silver Stars	3-1	Young Boys United	University Stadium, Yangon
15:30 UTC+06:30	Thet Aung 23', 44', 70'		Chit Thae Paing 51'

9 October 2025	Yangon City	1-1	Kachin United	University Stadium, Yangon
15:30 UTC+06:30	Sithu Aung 30'		Zay Yar Naing 89'

=== Week 7 ===
11 October 2025	Chinland	4-2	University	University Stadium, Yangon
15:30 UTC+06:30	Peter Paul 85'; Hein Thet Phyo 27', 85'; Hla Phone Oo 39'		Saw Pyae Sone Oo 20'; Than Htet Moe 51'

28 October 2025	Young Boys	0-10	Glory Goal	Padonmar Stadium, Yangon
15:30 UTC+06:30			Aung Phyo Thar 16'; Hein Htet Aung 23'; Messomo 37', 39', 61', 70', 87'; Thein Toe Aung 45+1'; Pejei 47'; Thet Wai Yan OO 82'

30 October 2025	Kachin United	6-2	Silver Star	Padonmar Stadium, Yangon
15:30 UTC+06:30	Sai Aung 21', 81'; Khun Aung Thar 44' (o.g.); Bhone Khant Aung 85'; Chit Htwe 83'; Zayar Naing 90'		Thet Aung 67' (pen.), 73' (pen.)

30 October 2025	Myawady	1-2	Yangon City	University Stadium, Yangon
15:30 UTC+06:30	Thiha Zaw 81' (pen.)		Sithu Aung 15', 55'

=== Week 8 ===
28 December 2025	Yangon City	6-0	Young Boys United	Padonmar Stadium, Yangon
15:30 UTC+06:30	Sithu Aung 23'; Htet Myat Lwin 43' (pen.); Hamdallah 69'; Min San 72', 90+2'; Yar Zar Moe 90+3'

28 December 2025	Silver Stars	0-6	Chinland	University Stadium, Yangon
15:30 UTC+06:30			Hla Phone Oo 10', 30', 71', 90+1'; Hein Thet Phyo 25'; Dawt Bik Thang 88'

29 December 2025	Glory Goal	0-1	University	Padonmar Stadium, Yangon
15:30 UTC+06:30			Aung Myint Myat 88'

29 December 2025	Myawady	0-0	Kachin United	University Stadium, Yangon
15:30 UTC+06:30

=== Week 9 ===
2 January 2026	Young Boys United	2-3	University	Padonmar Stadium, Yangon
15:30 UTC+06:30	Chit Thae Paing 62'; Aung Myint Myat 69'		Shine Htet Aung 13'; Aung Win Khant 52'; Than Toe Aung 82'

2 January 2026	Yangon City	8-0	Silver Star	University Stadium, Yangon
15:30 UTC+06:30	Zin Phyo Aung 2'; Aung Kaung Mann 5'; Sithu Aung 7', 31', 39'; Aung Zaya 44'; Win Naing Tun 59'; Min San 85'

3 January 2026	Kachin United	0-1	Glory Goal	University Stadium, Yangon
15:30 UTC+06:30			Messomo 60'

5 January 2026	Myawady	2-1	Chinland	Padonmar Stadium, Yangon
15:30 UTC+06:30	Thaw Zin Htwe 45+3', 55'		Ananie Philip 8'

=== Week 10 ===
8 January 2026	Kachin United	2-1	University	University Stadium, Yangon
15:30 UTC+06:30	Hkun Myat 6'; Saw Htay Aung 25'		San Pyae Sone Soe 41'

8 January 2026	Glory Goal	0-3	Yangon City	Padonmar Stadium, Yangon
15:30 UTC+06:30			Win Naing Tun 58'; Sithu Aung 90+2' (pen.); Min San 90+5'

9 January 2026	Chinland	13-1	Young Boys United	University Stadium, Yangon
15:30 UTC+06:30	Anane Philip 4', 7', 32'; Hla Phone OO 21', 40', 51', 55', 64', 79'; Hein Thet Phyo 24'; Thomas Gyires 86'; Van Hming Chhuang 87', 90'		Min Ko Khant 64'

9 January 2026	Myawady	5-2	Silver Stars	Padonmar Stadium, Yangon
15:30 UTC+06:30	Ye Pyae Naung 4', 37'; Thaw Wunna Zan 61', 87'; Thaw Zin Htwe 90+3'		That Win Tun 14'; Thuya Nyi Nyi 63'

=== Week 11 ===
13 January 2026	Silver Stars	0-3	Glory Goal	University Stadium, Yangon
15:30 UTC+06:30			Zaw Phyo Aung 33'; Htet Myat Ko 76'; Thein Toe Aung 90'

13 January 2026	Young Boys United	1-4	Myawady	Padonmar Stadium, Yangon
15:30 UTC+06:30	Wai Yan Oo 90+2' (o.g.)		Thaw Wunna Zin 12'; Win Ko Htay 40'; Pyae Phyo Aung 70'; Kyaw Za Ya min 84'

14 January 2026	University	2-0	Yangon City	Padonmar Stadium, Yangon
15:30 UTC+06:30	Kyaw Zin Htwe 2'; Saw Pyae Sone Soe 45+3'

14 January 2026	Kachin United	0-3	Chinland	University Stadium, Yangon
15:30 UTC+06:30			Anene Philip 21', 41'; Hla Phone Oo 63' (pen.)

=== Week 12 ===
18 January 2026	Silver Stars	2-4	University	PAdonmar Stadium, Yangon
15:30 UTC+06:30	Thura Nyi Nyi 4', 25'		Aung Win Khant 49'; Aung Myint Myat 60', 73', 86'

18 January 2026	Myawady	0-1	Glora Goal	University Stadium, Yangon
15:30 UTC+06:30			Thein Toe Aung 27'

19 January 2026	Young Boys United	1-3	Kachin United	University Stadium, Yangon
15:30 UTC+06:30	Nay Dun 45+2' (pen.)		Min Htet Zaw 17'; Sai Aung 48'; Thuu Rein Soe 53'

19 January 2026	Chinland	2-2	Yangon City	Padonmar Stadium, Yangon
15:30 UTC+06:30	Anene Philip 21', 58'		Han Tun Zaw 40'; Win Naing Tun 66'

=== Week 13 ===
23 January 2026	University	1-2	Myawady	University Stadium, Yangon
15:30 UTC+06:30	Aung Win Khant 17'		Kaung Htet Lin 22', 75'

23 January 2026	Chinland	5-2	Glory Goal	Padonmar Stadium, Yangon
15:30 UTC+06:30	Hla Phone Oo 1'; Anene Philip 40', 45+1', 90'; Thet Ko Ko 67'		Messoso 55'; Thein Toe AUng 90+1'

24 January 2026	Youngboys United	3-0	Silver Stars	University Stadium, Yangon
15:30 UTC+06:30	Pyae Sone Phone Myat 73'; Moe ya Chan 79'; Paing Thet Phyo 90+5'

24 January 2026	Kachin United	2-2	Yangon City	Padonmar Stadium, Yangon
15:30 UTC+06:30	Hkun Myat 61', 90'		Sithu Aung 22' (pen.); Min San 90+4'

=== Week 14 ===
28 January 2026	Silver Stars	1-5	Kachin United	YUSC Stadium, Yangon
15:30 UTC+06:30	Thura Nyi Nyi 21'		Bhone Khant Aung 31'; Tuu Jar 45+2'; Sai Aung 75'; Chit Htwe 83'; Zayar Naing 90+3'

28 January 2026	Glory Goal	1-3	Young Boys	University Stadium, Yangon
15:30 UTC+06:30	Hein Htet Aung 10'		Nay Don 22'; Pyae Sone Phone Myint 64'; Min Ko Khant 85'

29 January 2026	Yangon City	1-1	Myawady	University Stadium, Yangon
15:30 UTC+06:30	Sithu Aung 13'		Wai Yan Tun 57'

29 January 2026	University	1-2	Chinland	Thuwunna Stadium, Yangon
15:30 UTC+06:30	Aung Myint Myat 28'		Hla Phone Oo 60' (pen.), 86'

== Season statistics ==
=== Top goalscorers ===
As of 29 January 2026

Rank	Player	Team	Goals
1	(Myanmar) Hla Phone Oo	Chinland	22
2	(Myanmar) Sithu Aung	Yangon City	13
3	(Myanmar) Aung Myint Myat	University	12
4	(Cameroon) Anane Philip	Chinland	11
5	(Myanmar) Thet Aung	Silver Stars	7
5	(Cameroon) Messomo	Glory Goal	7

=== Hat-tricks ===
Player	For	Against	Result	Date
(Myanmar) Aung Myint Myat	University	Silver Stars	4-1	9 August 2025
(Myanmar) Zin Myo Aung	University	Young Boys United	7-3	29 August 2025
(Cameroon) Moubarak Ben	Yangon City	Young Boys United	8-0	7 September 2025
(Myanmar) Hla Phone Oo	Chinland	Kachin United	5-2	23 September 2025
(Myanmar) Thet Aung	Silver Star	Young Boys United	3-1	8 October 2025
(Cameroon) Messomo	Glory Goal	Young Boys United	10-0	28 October 2025
(Myanmar) Hla Phone Oo	Chinland	Silver Stars	6-0	28 December 2025
(Myanmar) Sithu Aung	Yangon City	Silver Stars	8-0	2 January 2026
(Myanmar) Hla Phone Oo	Chinland	Young Boy United	13-1	9 January 2026
(Cameroon) Anene Philip	Chinland	Young Boys United	13-1	9 January 2026

=== Clean sheets ===
As of 28 January 2026

Rank	Player	Team	Clean sheets
1	(Myanmar) Kaung Htet Kyaw	Myawady	5
2	(Myanmar) Aung Pyae Phyo	Chinland	4
2	(Cameroon) Leopold Kamguia	Yangon City	4
