= Hein Htet Aung =

Burmese footballer

Personal information
- Full name: Hein Htet Aung
- Date of birth: 5 October 2001 (age 25)
- Place of birth: Bago, Myanmar
- Height: 1.67 m (5 ft 5 1/2 in)
- Positions: Winger; forward

Team information
- Current team: Melaka
- Number: 10

Youth career
- 2011–2017: Myanmar Football Academy

Senior career*
Years	Team	Apps	(Gls)
2018–2020	Hanthawaddy United	58	(9)
2021	Selangor II	7	(2)
2021–2025	Selangor	55	(4)
2023–2025	→ Negeri Sembilan (loan)	36	(6)
2025	Yangon United	2	(0)
2025–2026	Kelantan The Real Warriors	18	(0)
2026–	Melaka		

International career^{‡}
2019	Myanmar U18	12	(2)
2017–2019	Myanmar U19	10	(0)
2017–2020	Myanmar U20	24	(8)
2017–2025	Myanmar U23	33	(6)
2021–	Myanmar	43	(1)
Medal record
Men's football
Representing Myanmar
Tri-Nation Series
Silver medal – second place	2023 India
AFF U-19 Youth Championship
Silver medal – second place	2018 Indonesia
Sea Games
Bronze medal – third place	2019 Philippines
- * Club domestic league appearances and goals as of 28 July 2026 ‡ National team caps and goals as of 4 August 2026

Hein Htet Aung (Burmese: ဟိန်းထက်အောင်; born 5 October 2001) is a Burmese professional footballer who plays as a winger or a forward. Hein is a graduate of Myanmar Football Academy. He was named player of the month for the 2020 Myanmar National League in September.

== Club statistics ==
Appearances and goals by club team and year
Club team	Year	Apps	Goals	Assists
Hanthawaddy United	2018	18	1	5
Hanthawaddy United	2019	22	2	7
Hanthawaddy United	2020	18	6	9
Selangor II	2021	7	2	10
Selangor	2021	19	2	6
Selangor	2022	29	2	5
Selangor	2023	14	0	2
Negeri Sembilan (loan)	2023	10	2	1
Negeri Sembilan (loan)	2024–25	26	4	3
Yangon United	2025	2	0	1
Kelantan The Real Warriors	2025–26	18	0	4
Total		183	21	53

== Career ==
=== Myanmar Football Academy ===
Hein Htet Aung joined Myanmar Football Academy in 2011 at the age of 10. Tipped as a gem in the squad, Hein Htet Aung represented the national team throughout his spell at the academy annually. Starting from Under 12, he went all the way up to Under 22 where he is currently playing. Hein Htet Aung began his career as a forward but after some years, he switched to the wings where he can operate as both left and right winger. In 2018, he transferred to his hometown club Hanthawaddy United FC to begin his professional career.

=== Hanthawaddy United ===
Hein Htet Aung began his professional career at Hanthawaddy United in 2018 after graduating from Myanmar Football Academy Mandalay. Deemed to be the next rising star of the country, Hein Htet Aung settled in Hanthawaddy United not long after he arrived at the club. In his first season, he helped his team finish fourth in 2018 Myanmar National League as well as claiming a second place in 2018 General Aung San Shield. 2019 was a tough year for Hein Htet Aung as Hanthawaddy United finished fifth in 2019 Myanmar National League. However, after major changes were made within the club, including a managerial change, Hein Htet Aung once again showed his full potential in the following year. 2020 was a successful year for Hein Htet Aung as he helped Hanthawaddy United finish second in 2020 Myanmar National League, which was the biggest achievement in club's history. Despite being only 18 years old at the time, Hein Htet Aung scored 6 goals and laid on 9 assists which made him a join top assister with his national teammate Lwin Moe Aung. Not only that he won Player Of The Month award in September, he was named the best young player of 2020 Myanmar National League at the end of the season. After a successful 3 years spell at Hanthawaddy United, scoring a total of 9 goals over 62 appearances, Hein Htet Aung has decided to part ways with the team in order to achieve his dream of playing abroad. He is expected to join a Selangor-based team in Malaysia for 2021–22 season.

=== Selangor ===
In early 2021, Htet joins Selangor for the rest of the season. On 13 August, his agent confirmed he has sign a new contract before his amazing performance against Kedah Darul Aman that he managed got two assist in 4–2 win.

==== Negeri Sembilan (loan) ====
On 1 August 2023, Htet signed to Negeri Sembilan on loan until the end of the 2023 season. On 7 March 2024, Htet's loan with Negeri Sembilan was extended until 30 April 2025.

== Controversies ==
On 6 March 2021, after a match between Selangor II and PDRM FC, Hein displayed a three-finger salute showing solidarity for the ongoing Myanmar protests. As a result, on 26 March, the Football Association of Malaysia (FAM) released a statement saying that Hein violated Article 59 of the FAM Disciplinary Code (2015 edition), and that he was given a one-match ban, not being allowed to participate in a match against Perak II on 2 April.

== International ==
As of match played 4 August 2026

Appearances and goals by national team and year
National team	Year	Apps	Goals	Assists
Myanmar	2021	6	0	1
Myanmar	2022	10	0	0
Myanmar	2023	8	0	1
Myanmar	2024	6	0	2
Myanmar	2025	5	0	0
Myanmar	2026	8	1	1
Total		43	1	5

== International goals ==
#	Date	Venue	Opponent	Score	Result	Competition
1.	4 August 2026	Thuwunna Stadium, Yangon, Myanmar	Laos	6–2	7–2	2026 ASEAN Championship

== Honours ==
Hanthawaddy United

- Silver medal: 2018 General Aung San Shield
- Silver medal: 2020 Myanmar National League
- Gold medal: 2020 Myanmar National League

Best Young Player of the Year

Selangor

- Malaysia Cup runner-up: 2022

Myanmar U-22

- Bronze medal: 2019 BTV Cup

Myanmar

- Tri-Nation Series (India) runner-up:2023

== Individual ==
Selangor

- Fan's Player Of The Year : 2022
