= Myanmar national football team results (2010–2019) =

This article details the fixtures and results of the Myanmar national football team in 2010s.

== Results and upcoming fixtures ==
Win Draw Lose

== 2010 ==
16 February 2010 2010 AFC Challenge Cup	Myanmar	4–0	Sri Lanka	Sugathadasa Stadium, Colombo
19:00	Kyaw Thi Ha 39'; Yan Paing 71'; Pai Soe 81'; Myo Min Tun 87'	Report		Attendance: 3,000; Referee: Alireza Faghani (Iran)

18 February 2010 2010 AFC Challenge Cup	Bangladesh	1–2	Myanmar	Sugathadasa Stadium, Colombo
19:00	Hossain 49'	Report	Tun Tun Win 16'; Pai Soe 32'	Attendance: 500; Referee: Mukhtar Al Yarimi (Yemen)

20 February 2010 2010 AFC Challenge Cup	Tajikistan	3–0	Myanmar	CR & FC Grounds, Colombo
19:00	Rabimov 33'; Hakimov 52'; Rabiev 88'	Report		Attendance: 100; Referee: Nawaf Abdulla (Bahrain)

24 February 2010 2010 AFC Challenge Cup	North Korea	5–0	Myanmar	Sugathadasa Stadium, Colombo
19:00	Choe Myong-Ho 6'; Choe Chol-Man 12', 73'; Pak Song-Chol 13'; Kim Seong-Yong 85'	Report		Attendance: 400; Referee: Mukhtar Al Yarimi (Yemen)

27 February 2010 2010 AFC Challenge Cup	Tajikistan	1–0	Myanmar	Sugathadasa Stadium, Colombo
15:30	Hakimov 11'	Report		Attendance: 300; Referee: Andre El Haddad (Lebanon)

2 December 2010 2010 AFF Championship	Vietnam	7–1	Myanmar	Mỹ Đình National Stadium, Hanoi
19:00	Nguyễn Anh Đức 13', 56'; Nguyễn Minh Phương 30'; Lê Tấn Tài 51'; Nguyễn Trọng Hoàng 73', 83'; Nguyễn Vũ Phong 90+4'	Report	Aung Kyaw Moe 16'	Attendance: 40,000; Referee: Pratap Singh (India)

5 December 2010 2010 AFF Championship	Singapore	2–1	Myanmar	Mỹ Đình National Stadium, Hanoi
17:00	Đurić 62'; Casmir 90+4'	Report	Khin Maung Lwin 13'	Referee: Tao Rancheng (China PR)

8 December 2010 2010 AFF Championship	Myanmar	0–0	Philippines	Thiên Trường Stadium, Nam Định
19:30		Report		Referee: Pratap Singh (India)

=== unofficial matches ===
26 January 2010 Friendly	Myanmar	1–3	(South Korea) Ulsan University	Yangon

1 February 2010 Thailand Tour	Myanmar	0–3	(Thailand) Royal Thai Army	Bangkok

3 February 2010 Thailand Tour	Myanmar	1–4	(Thailand) Thai Port	Bangkok

17 November 2010 Friendly	Myanmar	4–5	(China) Dalian Shide	Yangon

19 November 2010 Friendly	Myanmar	3–1	(China) Dalian Shide	Yangon

== 2011 ==
21 March 2011 2012 AFC Challenge Cup qualification	Myanmar	1–1	Philippines	Thuwunna YTC Stadium, Yangon
15:30 (UTC+6:30)	Khin Maung Lwin 90+3'	Report	J. Younghusband 76' (pen.)	Attendance: 5,000; Referee: Kim Jong-Hyeok (Korea Republic)

23 March 2011 2012 AFC Challenge Cup qualification	Bangladesh	2–0	Myanmar	Thuwunna YTC Stadium, Yangon
18:00(UTC+6:30)	Ahmed 10'; Komol 88'	Report		Attendance: 3,000; Referee: Apisit Aonrak (Thailand)

25 March 2011 2012 AFC Challenge Cup qualification	Myanmar	1–3	Palestine	Thuwunna YTC Stadium, Yangon
15:30 (UTC+6:30)	Zaw Htat Aung 25' (pen.)	Report	Alyan 39', 90'; Harbi 71'	Attendance: 1,500; Referee: Jameel Abdulhusain Mohamed (Bahrain)

18 June 2011 Friendly	Malaysia	2–0	Myanmar	Sultan Mohammad IV Stadium, Kota Bharu
	Amirul Hadi 28' Baddrol 54'

29 June 2011 2014 FIFA World Cup Qualification	Mongolia	1–0	Myanmar	MFF Football Centre, Ulaanbaatar
18:30 UTC+8	Tsend-Ayuush 48'	Report		Attendance: 3,500; Referee: Kim Jong-hyeok (Korea Republic)

3 July 2011 2014 FIFA World Cup Qualification	Myanmar	2–0	Mongolia	Thuwunna YTC Stadium, Yangon
15:30 UTC+6:30	Pai Soe 62'; Mai Aih Naing 88'	Report		Attendance: 18,000; Referee: Liu Kwok Man (Hong Kong)

14 July 2011 Friendly	Thailand	1–0	Myanmar	New I-mobile Stadium, Buriram, Thailand
	Dangda 3'

15 July 2011 Friendly	Myanmar	1–1	Thailand	New I-mobile Stadium, Buriram, Thailand
	Jakkapan 16'		Pai Soe 63'

23 July 2011 2014 FIFA World Cup Qualification	Oman	3–0; Awarded (Note: FIFA awarded Oman a 3–0 win. The match originally ended 2–0 to Oman.)	Myanmar	Seeb Stadium, Muscat
19:30 UTC+4	Al Hosni 21'; Al Ajmi 79'	Report		Attendance: 6,300; Referee: Ali Sabbagh (Lebanon)

28 July 2011 2014 FIFA World Cup Qualification	Myanmar	0–2 (Note: Due to a pitch invasion, the match was abandoned after 45+2 minutes with Oman leading 2–0; FIFA confirmed that the result at the time of the interruption of the match is final.)	Oman	Thuwunna YTC Stadium, Yangon
15:30 UTC+6:30		Report	Al Hosni 22'; Al Mahaijri 39' (pen.)	Attendance: 30,000; Referee: Ryuji Sato (Japan)

== 2012 ==
11 September 2012 Friendly	Myanmar	1–1	Singapore	Thuwunna YTC Stadium, Yangon
18:00(UTC+6:30)	David Htan 80'	Report

5 October 2012 2012 AFF Championship qualification	Myanmar	1–0	Brunei	Thuwunna YTC Stadium, Yangon
18:00(UTC+6:30)	Yan Aung Win 84'	Report		Attendance: 7,000; Referee: Ahmed Aslam (Maldives)

7 October 2012 2012 AFF Championship qualification	Timor-Leste	1–2	Myanmar	Thuwunna YTC Stadium, Yangon
18:00(UTC+6:30)	Alan 55'	Report	Kyi Lin 38', 73'	Attendance: 8,000; Referee: Tayeb Shamsuzzaman (Bangladesh)

11 October 2012 2012 AFF Championship qualification	Myanmar	3–0	Cambodia	Thuwunna YTC Stadium, Yangon
18:00(UTC+6:30)	Kyi Lin 59'; Kaung Sithu 65'; Pyae Phyo Aung 90+1'	Report		Referee: Mukhtar Al Yarimi (Yemen)

13 October 2012 2012 AFF Championship qualification	Laos	0–0	Myanmar	Thuwunna YTC Stadium, Yangon
18:00(UTC+6:30)		Report		Referee: Abdulla Al-Zaabi (United Arab Emirates)

24 November 2012 2012 AFF Championship	Vietnam	1–1	Myanmar	Rajamangala Stadium, Bangkok
17:30(UTC+7)	Lê Tấn Tài 34'	Report	Kyi Lin 53' (pen.)	Referee: Andre El Haddad (Lebanon)

27 November 2012 2012 AFF Championship	Myanmar	0–4	Thailand	Rajamangala Stadium, Bangkok
20:20(UTC+7)		Report	Teerasil 20', 82', 89'; Apipoo 59'	Referee: Yaqoob Abdul Baki (Oman)

30 November 2012 2012 AFF Championship	Philippines	2–0	Myanmar	Supachalasai Stadium, Bangkok
20:20(UTC+7)	P. Younghusband 47'; Á. Guirado 90+4'	Report		Referee: Yaqoob Abdul Baki (Oman)

== 2013 ==
2 February 2013 Friendly	Myanmar	0–1	Philippines	Thuwunna YTC Stadium, Yangon
17:00 (UTC+6:30)		Report	Porteria 77'

2 March 2013 2014 AFC Challenge Cup qualification	Myanmar	5–0	Guam	Thuwunna YTC Stadium, Yangon
18:45 (UTC+6:30)	Soe Min Oo 26'; Kyi Lin 40' (pen.); Pyae Phyo Aung 45+2'; Pai Soe 50'; Kyaw Zayar Win 80'	Report		Attendance: 3,000; Referee: Mohammad Abu Loum (Jordan)

4 March 2013 2014 AFC Challenge Cup qualification	Chinese Taipei	1–1	Myanmar	Thuwunna YTC Stadium, Yangon
18:45 (UTC+6:30)	Lee Meng-Chian 80' (pen.)	Report	Soe Kyaw Kyaw 18'	Attendance: 3,000; Referee: Ko Hyung-Jin (Korea Republic)

6 March 2013 2014 AFC Challenge Cup qualification	Myanmar	1–0	India	Thuwunna YTC Stadium, Yangon
18:45 (UTC+6:30)	Soe Min Oo 75'	Report		Attendance: 6,000; Referee: Mohammad Abu Loum (Jordan)

4 June 2013 Friendly	Myanmar	0–2	Singapore	Thuwunna YTC Stadium, Yangon
19:30 (UTC+6:30)			Amri 61'; Shaiful 11'	Attendance: 5,000

== 2014 ==
19 May 2014 2014 AFC Challenge Cup	Maldives	2–3	Myanmar	National Football Stadium, Malé
21:00 UTC+5	Umair 55'; Ashfaq 90+6'	Report	Kyaw Ko Ko 39', 90+5'; Nyein Chan Aung 45+1'	Attendance: 8,300; Referee: Abdullah Balideh (Qatar)

21 May 2014 2014 AFC Challenge Cup	Myanmar	0–2	Palestine	National Football Stadium, Malé
21:00 UTC+5		Report	Abuhabib 45+4'; Nu'man 50'	Attendance: 600; Referee: Nagor Amir Noor Mohamed (Malaysia)

23 May 2014 2014 AFC Challenge Cup	Kyrgyzstan	1–0	Myanmar	Addu Football Stadium, Addu City
21:00 UTC+5	Verevkin 18'	Report		Attendance: 300; Referee: Ko Hyung-jin (South Korea)

2 July 2014 Friendly	Vietnam	6–0	Myanmar	Gò Đậu Stadium, Thủ Dầu Một
UTC+7

3 September 2014 2014 Philippine Peace Cup	Myanmar	4–1	Palestine	Rizal Memorial Stadium, Manila
16:00	Kyaw Zayar Win 26', 49'; Tin Win Aung 38'; Nanda Lin Kyaw Chit 71'	Report	Wridat 87'	Referee: Steve Supresencia (Philippines)

6 September 2014 2014 Philippine Peace Cup	Philippines	2–3 (a.e.t.)	Myanmar	Rizal Memorial Stadium, Manila
19:00	Sato 50'; P. Younghusband 71' (pen.)	Report	Kyaw Ko Ko 8'; Min Min Thu 90+2'; Soe Min Oo 103'	Referee: Xaypaseuth Phonsanit (Laos)

14 October 2014 2014 AFF Championship qualification	Myanmar	0–0	Timor-Leste	New Laos National Stadium, Vientiane
18:30 UTC+7		Report		Referee: Jumpei Iida (Japan)

16 October 2014 2014 AFF Championship qualification	Brunei	1–3	Myanmar	New Laos National Stadium, Vientiane
18:30 UTC+7	Adi 78'	Report	Min Min Thu 48'; Kyaw Ko Ko 53'; Kyi Lin 82'	Referee: Adham Makhadmeh (Jordan)

18 October 2014 2014 AFF Championship qualification	Cambodia	0–1	Myanmar	New Laos National Stadium, Vientiane
15:30 UTC+7		Report	Kyaw Ko Ko 42' (pen.)	Referee: Jumpei Iida (Japan)

20 October 2014 2014 AFF Championship qualification	Myanmar	2–1	Laos	New Laos National Stadium, Vientiane
17:00 UTC+7	Nanda Lin Kyaw Chit 43'; Kyaw Ko Ko 80' (pen.)	Report	Souksavanh 90+4' (pen.)	Referee: Dmitriy Mashentsev (Kyrgyzstan)

23 November 2014 2014 AFF Championship	Malaysia	0–0	Myanmar	Jalan Besar Stadium, Kallang
18:00 UTC+8		Report		Referee: Çarymyrat Kurbanow (Turkmenistan)

26 November 2014 2014 AFF Championship	Myanmar	2–4	Singapore	National Stadium, Kallang
20:00 UTC+8	Kyaw Zayar Win 55'; Kyaw Ko Ko 62' (pen.)	Report	Shaiful 15'; Hariss 35', 42'; Khin Maung Lwin 75' (o.g.)	Referee: Ilgiz Tantashev (Uzbekistan)

29 November 2014 2014 AFF Championship	Thailand	2–0	Myanmar	Jalan Besar Stadium, Kallang
20:00 UTC+8	Tanaboon 12'; Prakit 84'	Report		Referee: Çarymyrat Kurbanow (Turkmenistan)

== 2015 ==
30 March 2015 Friendly	Indonesia	2–1	Myanmar	National Football Stadium, Malé
17:00 UTC+7	Maitimo 74'; González 81'	Report	David Htan 87'	Attendance: 8,300; Referee: Abdullah Balideh (Qatar)

5 June 2015 Friendly	Myanmar	0–1	Cambodia	Nonthaburi, Thailand
18:00			Borey 38'	Stadium: King Rama 9 Commemoration Sports Stadium

11 June 2015 2018 FIFA World Cup Qualification	Laos	2–2	Myanmar	Vientiane, Laos
19:00 UTC+7	Sayavutthi 81' (pen.), 83'	Report (FIFA); Report (AFC)	Zaw Min Tun 41'; Kyaw Zayar Win 85'	Stadium: New Laos National Stadium; Attendance: 1,500; Referee: Tan Hai (China)

16 June 2015 2018 FIFA World Cup Qualification	Myanmar	0–2	South Korea	Bangkok, Thailand
19:00 UTC+7		Report (FIFA); Report (AFC)	Lee Jae-sung 35'; Son Heung-min 67'	Stadium: Rajamangala Stadium; Attendance: 1,090; Referee: Ahmed Al-Kaf (Oman)

28 August 2015 Friendly	United Arab Emirates	1–0	Myanmar	Abu Dhabi, United Arab Emirates
19:15 UTC+4	Al Akbari 45'			Stadium: Zayed Sports City Stadium

3 September 2015 2018 FIFA World Cup Qualification	Kuwait	9–0	Myanmar	Doha, Qatar
20:00 UTC+3	Nasser 11', 18'; Maqseed 12'; Zaid 46'; Zaw Min Tun 56' (o.g.); Al Misha'an 61'; Al Mutawa 69' (pen.), 88', 90+3'	Report (FIFA); Report (AFC)		Stadium: Abdullah bin Khalifa Stadium; Attendance: 550; Referee: Aziz Asimov (Uzbekistan)

7 September 2015 Friendly	Myanmar	1–1	New Zealand	Yangon, Myanmar
18:00 UTC+6:30	Thiha Zaw 66'		Shane Smeltz 42' (pen.)	Stadium: Thuwunna Stadium

8 October 2015 2018 FIFA World Cup Qualification	Myanmar	0–2	Lebanon	Bangkok, Thailand
19:00 UTC+7		Report (FIFA); Report (AFC)	Maatoukk 28'; Atwi 90+3'	Stadium: Suphachalasai Stadium; Attendance: 3,056; Referee: Mohd Nafeez Abdul Wahab (Malaysia)

13 October 2015 2018 FIFA World Cup Qualification	Myanmar	3–1	Laos	Bangkok, Thailand
19:00 UTC+7	Suan Lam Mang 13'; Kyaw Ko Ko 32'; Aung Thu 50'	Report (FIFA); Report (AFC)	Sayavutthi 2'	Stadium: Suphachalasai Stadium; Attendance: 6,500; Referee: Salah Abbas Alabbasi (Bahrain)

7 November 2015 Friendly	Hong Kong	5–0	Myanmar	Mong Kok, Hong Kong
17:00 UTC+8	McKee 3', 45'; Chan Siu Ki 33'; Sandro 66'; Alex Tayo 75'			Stadium: Mong Kok Stadium; Attendance: 5,247

12 November 2015 2018 FIFA World Cup Qualification	South Korea	4–0	Myanmar	Suwon, South Korea
20:00 UTC+9	Lee Jae-sung 18'; Koo Ja-cheol 30'; Jang Hyun-soo 82'; Nam Tae-hee 86'	Report (FIFA); Report (AFC)		Stadium: Suwon World Cup Stadium; Attendance: 24,270; Referee: Khamis Al-Marri (Qatar)

== 2016 ==
24 March 2016 Friendly	Singapore	2–1	Myanmar	Kallang, Singapore
19:45 UTC+8	Shahril 27'; Fazrul 87'		Suan Lam Mang 65'	Stadium: Jalan Besar Stadium; Attendance: 5,280

29 March 2016 2018 FIFA World Cup Qualification	Lebanon	1–1	Myanmar	Sidon, Lebanon
17:00 UTC+3	El-Helwe 88'	Report (FIFA); Report (AFC)	Aung Thu 78'	Stadium: Saida Municipal Stadium; Attendance: 3,470; Referee: Jumpei Iida (Japan)

28 May 2016 Friendly	Myanmar	0–0	Malaysia	Yangon, Myanmar
				Stadium: Thuwunna Stadium; Attendance: 27,860; Referee: Sivakorn Pu-Udom (Thailand)

3 June 2016 2016 AYA Bank Cup	Myanmar	0–1	Singapore	Yangon, Myanmar
			Faris 35'	Stadium: Thuwunna Stadium; Attendance: 31,000

6 June 2016 2016 AYA Bank Cup	Myanmar	3–0	Hong Kong	Yangon, Myanmar
	Than Paing 22'; Maung Maung Lwin 74'; Ye Ko Oo 89'			Stadium: Thuwunna Stadium; Attendance: 6,100

4 November 2016 Friendly	Myanmar	0–0	Indonesia	Yangon, Myanmar
				Stadium: Thuwunna Stadium; Attendance: 3,000

14 November 2016 Friendly	Myanmar	0–3	Oman	Yangon, Myanmar
17:00 UTC+5			Al-Nahar 8'; Q.Said 56'; Al-Khaldi 67'	Stadium: Thuwunna Stadium

20 November 2016 2016 AFF Championship	Myanmar	1–2	Vietnam	Thuwunna YTC Stadium, Yangon
18:00 UTC+6:30	Aung Thu 73'	Report	Quyết 24'; Vinh 80'	Attendance: 28,040; Referee: Hiroyuki Kimura (Japan)

23 November 2016 2016 AFF Championship	Cambodia	1–3	Myanmar	Thuwunna YTC Stadium, Yangon
18:00 UTC+6:30	Suhana 14'	Report	Zaw Min Tun 35', 40'; Aung Thu 57'	Attendance: 15,236; Referee: Kim Dong-jin (South Korea)

26 November 2016 2016 AFF Championship	Myanmar	1–0	Malaysia	Thuwunna YTC Stadium, Yangon
18:00 UTC+6:30	David Htan 89'	Report		Attendance: 32,758; Referee: Yaqoob Abdul Baki (Oman)

4 December 2016 2016 AFF Championship	Myanmar	0–2	Thailand	Thuwunna YTC Stadium, Yangon
18:00 UTC+6:30		Report	Teerasil 24', 55'	Attendance: 33,122; Referee: Ilgiz Tantashev (Uzbekistan)

8 December 2016 2016 AFF Championship	Thailand	4–0	Myanmar	Rajamangala Stadium, Bangkok
19:00 UTC+7:00	Sarawut 33'; Theerathon 66' (pen.); Siroch 76'; Chanathip 83'	Report		Attendance: 43,638; Referee: Adham Makhadmeh (Jordan)

== 2017 ==
21 March 2017 Friendly	Indonesia	1–3 (Note: For the Friendly against Myanmar, Indonesia used under-22 team.)	Myanmar	Pakansari Stadium, Bogor
16:00 UTC+6:30	Hargianto 22'	Report	Maung Maung Lwin 37'; Kyaw Ko Ko 74'(P); Sithu Aung 90+1'	Attendance: 13,150; Referee: Clifford Daypuyat (Philippines)

28 March 2017 2019 Asian Cup Qualification	Myanmar	0–1	India	Thuwunna YTC Stadium, Yangon
18:00 UTC+6:30		Report	Chhetri 90+1'	Attendance: 21,025; Referee: Yu Ming-hsun (Chinese Taipei)

6 June 2017 Friendly	Singapore	1–1	Myanmar	Jalan Besar Stadium, Kallang
	Nazrul Nazari 90+4'	Report	Aung Thu 60'

13 June 2017 2019 Asian Cup Qualification	Macau	0–4	Myanmar	Estádio Campo Desportivo, Taipa
19:30 UTC+8		Report	Sithu Aung 4', 62'; Kyaw Ko Ko 30'; Min Min Thu 74'	Attendance: 1,200; Referee: Kim Dae-yong (South Korea)

29 August 2017 Friendly	Myanmar	1–0	Malaysia	Thuwunna YTC Stadium, Yangon
16:00 UTC+6:30	Kyaw Ko Ko 90'

5 October 2017 Friendly	Myanmar	1–3	Thailand	Mandalarthiri Stadium, Mandalay
18:00 UTC+6:30	Aung Thu 50'		Mongkol 12'; Teerasil 32'; Thitiphan 79' (p)	Attendance: 15,000; Referee: Lim Bunthoeun (Cambodia)

10 October 2017 2019 Asian Cup Qualification	Myanmar	2–2	Kyrgyzstan	Thuwunna YTC Stadium, Yangon
19:00 UTC+6:30	Aung Thu 52'; Kyaw Ko Ko 90+2'	Report	Zemlianukhin 9' (pen.); Maier 49'	Attendance: 2,886; Referee: Ali Abdulnabi (Bahrain)

9 November 2017 Friendly	Cambodia	1–2	Myanmar	Olympic Stadium, Phnom Penh
18:30 UTC+7	Mony Udom 50'		Zaw Min Tun 15'; Aung Thu 71'

14 November 2017 2019 Asian Cup Qualification	India	2–2	Myanmar	Fatorda Stadium, Margao
20:00 UTC+5:30	Chhetri 13' (pen.); Lalpekhlua 69'	Report	Yan Naing Oo 1'; Kyaw Ko Ko 19'	Attendance: 5,546; Referee: Liu Kwok Man (Hong Kong)

== 2018 ==
22 March 2018 2019 Asian Cup Qualification	Kyrgyzstan	5–1	Myanmar	Incheon Football Stadium, Incheon (South Korea) (Note: On 24 November 2017, the AFC announced that the match will be played on 22 March 2018 at a neutral venue, with the Football Federation of the Kyrgyz Republic covering all the costs of the Myanmar team and of the match organisation, including airfares and accommodation. The two Member Associations will be requested to agree on the neutral venue, and if they fail to reach a consensus the AFC will make the appointment.)
	Shamshiev 2'; Zemlianukhin 5', 63'; Lux 74'; Sagynbaev 87'	Report; Report	Kyaw Ko Ko 83'	Attendance: 1068; Referee: Sukhbir Singh (Singapore)

27 March 2018 2019 Asian Cup Qualification	Myanmar	1–0	Macau	Thuwunna YTC Stadium, Yangon
18:00 UTC+6:30	Kyi Lin 76'	Report; Report		Attendance: 4,638; Referee: Minoru Tōjō (Japan)

11 May 2018	Myanmar	0–2	(England) Leeds United	Mandalay, Myanmar
12:30 BST		Report	Edmondson 59'; Grot 84'	Stadium: Mandalarthiri Stadium

26 May 2018 Friendly	China	1–0	Myanmar	Jiangning Sports Center, Nanjing
19:30 UTC+8	Wu Lei 41'	Report		Attendance: 16,537; Referee: Hettikamkanamge Perera (Sri Lanka)

10 October 2018 Friendly	Indonesia	3–0	Myanmar	Wibawa Mukti Stadium, Cikarang
18:30 UTC+7	Alberto Gonçalves 19'; Irfan Jaya 26', 39'	Report		Attendance: 4,217; Referee: Hiroyuki Kimura (Japan)

13 October 2018 Friendly	Myanmar	0–3	Bolivia	Thuwunna YTC Stadium, Yangon
18:00 (UTC+6:30)		Report	Haquín 5'; Martins 25'; L. Vaca 67'	Attendance: 5,869; Referee: Chaireag Ngamsom (Thailand)

16 October 2018 Friendly	Bahrain	4–1	Myanmar	Bahrain National Stadium, Riffa
22:45 (UTC+6:30)	Rashid 45+1' (pen.); Marhoon 48', 69'; Issa 70'	Report	Myat Kaung Khant 52'	Referee: Khalid Al-Turais (Saudi Arabia)

12 November 2018 2018 AFF Championship GS	Myanmar	4–1	Cambodia	Mandalarthiri Stadium, Mandalay
18:00 UTC+6:30	Hlaing Bo Bo 60', 90+3'; Than Htet Aung 70'; Sithu Aung 87'	Report (AFFSZ); Report (AFF)	Vathanaka 23'	Attendance: 26,946; Referee: Clifford Daypuyat (Philippines)

16 November 2018 2018 AFF Championship GS	Laos	1–3	Myanmar	New Laos National Stadium, Vientiane
19:30 UTC+7	Innalay 14'	Report (AFFSZ); Report (AFF)	Aung Thu 45'; Htet Phyoe Wai 72'; Maung Maung Lwin 84'	Attendance: 1,294; Referee: Kim Hee-gon (South Korea)

20 November 2018 2018 AFF Championship GS	Myanmar	0–0	Vietnam	Thuwunna YTC Stadium, Yangon
18:00 UTC+6:30		Report (AFFSZ); Report (AFF)		Attendance: 29,954; Referee: Khamis Al-Marri (Qatar)

24 November 2018 2018 AFF Championship GS	Malaysia	3–0	Myanmar	Bukit Jalil National Stadium, Kuala Lumpur
20:30 UTC+8	Norshahrul 26'; Zaquan 45+3' (pen.), 88'	Report (AFFSZ); Report (AFF)		Attendance: 83,777; Referee: Alireza Faghani (Iran)

== 2019 ==
19 March Friendly	Myanmar	0–0	Chinese Taipei	Mandalarthiri Stadium, Mandalay
19:00 UTC+6:30		Report

25 March Friendly	Myanmar	0–2	Indonesia	Mandalarthiri Stadium, Mandalay
19:00 UTC+6:30		Report	Nwokolo 41'; Spasojević 85' (pen.)	Referee: Torpong Somsingha (Thailand)

11 June Friendly	Singapore	1–2	Myanmar	National Stadium, Kallang
19:30 UTC+8	Quak 25'	Report	Kyaw Ko Ko 5', 68'	Referee: Suhaizi bin Shukri (Malaysia)

30 August Friendly^{1}	China	4–1	Myanmar	Xianghe, Hebei
17:30 UTC+8	Yang Xu 13'; Feng Jin 15'; Wu Xi 20', 23'		Zaw Min Tun 60'	Stadium: National Football Training Centre

5 September 2022 WCQ R2	Mongolia	1–0	Myanmar	Ulanbaatar, Mongolia
17:00 UTC+8	Dölgöön Amaraa 17'	Report (FIFA); Report (AFC)		Stadium: MFF Football Centre; Attendance: 3,221; Referee: Rowan Arumughan (India)

10 September 2022 WCQ R2	Myanmar	0–2	Japan	Yangon, Myanmar
18:50 UTC+6:30		Report (FIFA); Report (AFC)	Nakajima 16'; Minamino 26'	Stadium: Thuwunna Stadium; Attendance: 25,500; Referee: Ahmad Yacoub Ibrahim (Jordan)

10 October 2022 WCQ R2	Kyrgyzstan	7–0	Myanmar	Bishkek, Kyrgyzstan
20:30 UTC+6	Bernhardt 5', 10', 87' (pen.); Shukurov 20', 71'; Alykulov 26'; Kichin 45'	Report (FIFA); Report (AFC)		Stadium: Dolen Omurzakov Stadium; Attendance: 13,000; Referee: Omar Mohamed Al-Ali (United Arab Emirates)

7 November Friendly^{1}	Myanmar	3–0	Nepal	Mandalay
17:00 UTC+6:30	Suan Lam Mang 3'; David Htan 45+1'; Hlaing Bo Bo 71'	Report		Stadium: Mandalarthiri Stadium

14 November 2022 WCQ R2	Myanmar	4–3	Tajikistan	Yangon, Myanmar
17:00 UTC+6:30	Suan Lam Mang 10', 41'; Sithu Aung 48'; Maung Maung Lwin 63'	Report (FIFA); Report (AFC)	M. Dzhalilov 36' (pen.), 76'; Vosiyev 57'	Stadium: Thuwunna Stadium; Attendance: 7,365; Referee: Masoud Tufayelieh (Syria)

19 November 2022 WCQ R2	Myanmar	1–0	Mongolia	Yangon, Myanmar
17:00 UTC+6:30	Hlaing Bo Bo 17'	Report (FIFA); Report (AFC)		Stadium: Thuwunna Stadium; Attendance: 17,468; Referee: Nazmi Nasaruddin (Malaysia)

- ^{1} : Non FIFA 'A' international match
