= Myanmar Football Academy =

- Chairman: Zaw Zaw
- Manager: Nyi Nyi Latt
- Website: www.the-mff.org

The Myanmar Football Academy, headed by Myanmar Football President, Zaw Zaw. Myanmar Football Federation has three Academies in Myanmar. There are National Football Academy (Yangon), Myanmar Football Academy (Mandalay) and Ayeyarwady Football Academy (Pathein).

== National Football Academy (Yangon) ==
FIFA president Gianni Infantino officially declared open Myanmar’s National Football Academy on 17 February 2017.

Founded	29 December 2015
Location	Waizayantar Road, Thingangyan Township, near by MFF Office.
Total Area	6.55 Acres
Building Area	Length - 245 ft, width - 49 ft
Contribution from FIFA	500,000 USD
Contribution from MFF	284,794 USD
Total Project Cost	2,784,794 USD

== Myanmar Football Academy (Mandalay) ==
2011 March 15, FIFA President, Sepp Blatter opens Myanmar Football Academy (Mandalay).

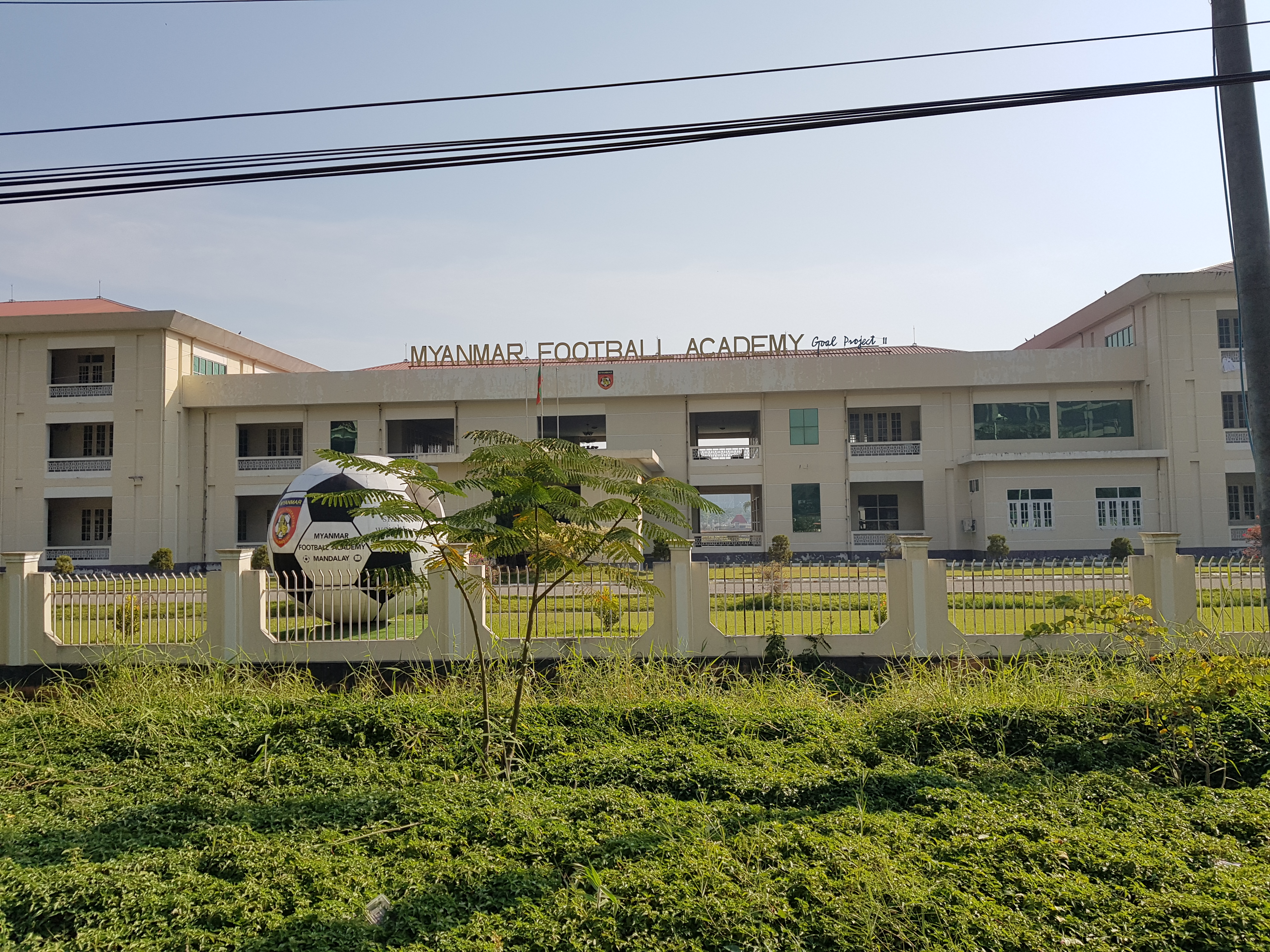
Mandalay Football Academy

Founded	4 June 2006
Location	73rd Road, Chanmyathazi Township, near by Mandalarthiri Stadium, Mandalay
Building Type	2 Storey Reinforced Concrete Building
Building Area	Length - 245 ft, width - 49 ft
Goal Project from FIFA	USD 400,000
FIFA မွ Goal Project investment	USD 400,000
Yearly Contribution from FAP for 2005	USD 250,000
Yearly Contribution from FAP for 2006	USD 250,000
Investment from MFF	USD 100,000
Total Project Cost	USD 1,000,000

== Ayeyawady Football Academy (Pathein) ==
US Dollars Two hundred and fifty thousand was donated by Asian Football Confederation and the remaining US Dollars five hundred thousand was donated by Ayeyawady Foundation for a total cost of US Dollars seven hundred and fifty thousand. Land is donated by Government.

Founded	4 June 2006
Location	Pathein Township, Ayeyawady Region
Building Type	3 Storey Reinforced Concrete Building
Building Area	12052 sq-ft (1120 sq-m)
Overall Length	137 ft (41.75m)
Overall width	44 ft (13.41m)
Total Project Cost	USD 750,000

== Academy team ==
=== Current management ===
Position	Name	Nationality
Academy Director:	Zaw Zaw	Myanmar
Team Leader:	Moe Wai Aung	Myanmar
Head of Coaching/U18 Manager:	Nyi Nyi Latt	Myanmar
Academy Operations Manager:	Min Thu	Myanmar
Goalkeeping Coach:	Mya Ko Min	Myanmar

=== Current Academy squad ===
No.	Pos.	Player	Date of birth (age)	Caps	Goals	Club
1	GK	Htet Wai Yan Soe				(Myanmar) MFF Mandalay Academy
18	GK	Aung Myint Myat				(Myanmar) MFF Mandalay Academy
21	GK	Khaung Phone Kyaw				(Myanmar) MFF Mandalay Academy
2	DF	Min Myat Thu				(Myanmar) MFF Mandalay Academy
3	DF	Kyaw Phyo Wai				(Myanmar) MFF Mandalay Academy
4	DF	Bo Bo Aung				(Myanmar) MFF Mandalay Academy
5	DF	Thet Paing Htwe				(Myanmar) MFF Mandalay Academy
12	DF	Sithu Moe Khant				(Myanmar) MFF Mandalay Academy
14	DF	Thura San				(Myanmar) MFF Mandalay Academy
15	DF	Pyae Phyo Maung				(Myanmar) MFF Mandalay Academy
16	DF	Dwe Ko Ko				(Myanmar) MFF Mandalay Academy
20	DF	Zwe Khant Min				(Myanmar) MFF Mandalay Academy
8	MF	Phone Nanda				(Myanmar) MFF Mandalay Academy
9	MF	Thet Paing Htoo				(Myanmar) MFF Mandalay Academy
11	MF	Wai Yan Oo				(Myanmar) MFF Mandalay Academy
13	MF	Ye Win Tun				(Myanmar) MFF Mandalay Academy
19	MF	Htet Phyo Wai				(Myanmar) MFF Mandalay Academy
17	FW	Hein Htet Aung				(Myanmar) MFF Mandalay Academy
23	FW	Ye Yint Aung				(Myanmar) MFF Mandalay Academy

== Academy graduates ==
=== Now playing elsewhere ===
- Aung Thu, now at (Thailand) BEC Tero, has played for Myanmar
- Kyaw Min Oo, now at Yangon United, has played for Myanmar
- Sann Satt Naing, now at Yangon United, has played for Myanmar
- Phone Thit Sar Min, now at Shan United, has played for Myanmar U-20
- Aung Wanna Soe, now at Yadanarbon, has played for Myanmar U-20
- Win Naing Tun, now at Yadanarbon, has played for Myanmar U-23
- Pyae Sone Naing, now at Yadanarbon, has played for Myanmar U-23
- Myat Kaung Khant, now at Yadanarbon, has played for Myanmar U-23
- Hein Htet Aung, now at Hanthawaddy United FC, has played for Myanmar U-23
