= Yangon City F.C. =

Association football club in Myanmar

Yangon City ရန်ကုန်စီးတီးအက်ဖ်စီ
- Full name: Yangon City Football Club
- Nicknames: The Blues; The Royals
- Short name: YCFC
- Founded: 2024; 2 years ago
- Ground: Padaythar Stadium
- Capacity: 5,000
- Owner: City Holdings Group
- President: Nay Win Aung
- Head coach: Hiroki Ono
- League: MNL-2
- 2025–26: 3rd
- Website: https://yangoncityfc.com/
Home colours	Away colours

Yangon City Football Club (Burmese: ရန်ကုန် စီးတီး ဘောလုံးအသင်း), also known as Yangon Royals, is a Burmese professional football club based in Yangon. Founded in 2024, the club competes in the M League and is backed by the City Holdings Group. Its women's team competes in the Myanmar Women League.

== History ==
=== Foundation and MNL entry ===
Yangon Royals was established in mid-2024 with the aim of developing local talent and contributing to the national team. The club took part in the Myanmar National League expansion, making its debut in the 2024 season. They signed Myanmar national team player, Win Naing Tun and Aung Kaung Mann. In early 2025, the club signed former U-19 national coach U Aung Naing, known for leading Shan United to the 2019 league title. After the half of 2025-2026 season, the club appointed former Shan United head coach, Hiroki Ono, who lead the club to the league champion in 2024/2025, as a technical director and he has been leading the club as a head coach since the beginning of the 2026/2027 season.

=== 2026-27 ===
In 2026, they changed their club name to Yangon City.They play home matches at Padaythar Stadium. Also, Yangon City signed Myanmar national team players, Myat Kaung Khant, Khun Kyaw Zin Hein, Zwe Khant Min and Zwe Htet Min from Shan United.

== First-team squad ==
As of August 2026

Note: Flags indicate national team as defined under FIFA eligibility rules; some limited exceptions apply. Players may hold more than one non-FIFA nationality.

No.	Pos.	Nation	Player
1	GK	MYA	Phone Thit Sar Min
2	DF	MYA	Zwe Khant Min
3	DF	BRA	Pedro
5	DF	MYA	Zwe Htet Min
6	MF	MYA	Zin Phyo Aung
7	FW	MYA	Aung Kaung Mann
8	MF	JPN	Ryuji Hirota
9	FW	MYA	Win Naing Tun
10	MF	MYA	Myat Kaung Khant
11	MF	MYA	Khun Kyaw Zin Hein
13	MF	JPN	Seigou Tsuchiya
14	MF	POR	Gilson Costa
15	DF	MYA	Zaw Myo Tun
16	DF	MYA	Zwe Thet Paing

No.	Pos.	Nation	Player
18	DF	JPN	Haruki Yamamura
19	FW	MYA	Than Toe Aung
20	DF	MYA	Kaung Khant Kyaw
22	GK	MYA	Soe Arkar
25	DF	MYA	Chit Htoo
27	MF	MYA	Kyaw Win Thein
29	MF	MYA	Yan Naing Oo
36	DF	MYA	Nyan Lin Htet
70	FW	SEN	Karim Samb
—	FW	MYA	Win Ko Htay
—	DF	MYA	Zaw Win Maung
—	DF	MYA	Kaung Khant Lwin
—	MF	MYA	Aung Thiha
—	FW	MYA	Thiha
—	DF	MYA	Soe Moe Kyaw

== Kits and sponsors ==
Period	Kit manufacturer	Title sponsor
2025–2026	(Myanmar) M21	Spider
2026–	(Thailand) Ego Sports	Shan Pae Poke

== Honours ==
=== League ===
- MNL-2 Promotion Amateur Club Tournament
  - Champions (1): 2025
