= Phone Thit Sar Min =

Burmese footballer

Personal information
- Full name: Phone Thit Sar Min
- Date of birth: 6 November 1997 (age 28)
- Place of birth: Yangon, Myanmar
- Height: 1.80 m (5 ft 11 in)
- Position: Goalkeeper

Team information
- Current team: Yangon City
- Number: 1

Youth career
- 2015–16: Myanmar Football Academy
- 2016–17: Shan United U-21

Senior career*
Years	Team	Apps	(Gls)
2018–2022	Shan United	14	(0)
2022–2024	Yangon United	7	(0)
2026–	Yangon City	0	(0)

International career^{‡}
2016–2019	Myanmar U21	6	(0)
- * Club domestic league appearances and goals as of 2 June 2026 ‡ National team caps and goals as of 18 March 2018

Phone Thit Sar Min (Burmese: ဖုန်းသစ္စာမင်း; also spelled Bhone Thitsar Min or Phone Thitsar Min, born 6 November 1997) is a Burmese professional footballer who plays as a goalkeeper for Yangon United and Myanmar U21 National Team.

== Club career ==
=== Early year ===
Phone Thit Sar Min was a product of Myanmar Football Academy. In 2017, Shan United F.C. signed for Shan U-21 team. He became a main player and Captain of Shan United F.C. U-21 team. He showed his talent in Myanmar national under-21 football team.

=== Shan United ===
In 2018, Shan United chose Phone Thit Sar Min for 2018 Myanmar National League squad list. March 2018, he played his first professional match against Ceres–Negros at Home.

=== Yangon City ===
After he recovered from Knee injury for 2years, Yangon City signed him.

== Honours ==
=== Club ===
Shan United

- Myanmar National League
  - Winners (2): 2017, 2019
  - Runners-up (1): 2018
- General Aung San Shield
  - Champions (1): 2017
  - Runners-up (1): 2019
