= Gilson Costa =

Portuguese footballer (born 1996)

Personal information
- Full name: Gilson Sequeira da Costa
- Date of birth: 24 September 1996 (age 30)
- Place of birth: São Tomé, São Tomé and Príncipe
- Height: 1.78 m (5 ft 10 in)
- Position: Defensive midfielder

Team information
- Current team: Yangon City
- Number: 14

Youth career
- 2006–2007: UR Mercês
- 2007–2010: Sporting CP
- 2010–2011: Belenenses
- 2011–2015: Benfica

Senior career*
Years	Team	Apps	(Gls)
2015–2017	Benfica B	40	(2)
2017	→ Arouca (loan)	2	(0)
2017–2018	Boavista	3	(0)
2019–2020	Estoril	0	(0)
2020–2021	Doxa Katokopias	18	(0)
2021–2022	Al-Nahda		
2022–2023	Aksu	7	(0)
2023	Nejmeh	7	(0)
2024–2025	Persebaya Surabaya	22	(0)
2025–2026	Tarxien Rainbows	4	(1)
2026	Mosta	3	(0)
2026–	Yangon City	1	(0)

International career
2013–2014	Portugal U18	7	(1)
2014–2015	Portugal U19	9	(1)
2016	Portugal U20	5	(0)
- * Club domestic league appearances and goals as of 12 April 2025

Gilson Sequeira da Costa (born 24 September 1996) is a professional footballer who plays as a defensive midfielder for M League club Yangon City. Born in São Tomé and Príncipe, he represented Portugal at youth level.

== Club career ==
On 15 August 2015, Costa made his professional debut with Benfica B in a 2015–16 Segunda Liga match against Penafiel.

In June 2023, Lebanese Premier League side Nejmeh announced the signing of Costa.

== Honours ==
Nejmeh

- Lebanese Premier League: 2023–24
- Lebanese Super Cup: 2023
