= Lwin Moe Aung =

Burmese footballer

Personal information
- Full name: Lwin Moe Aung
- Date of birth: December 10, 1999 (age 26)
- Place of birth: Amarapura, Mandalay, Myanmar
- Height: 1.72 m (5 ft 8 in)
- Positions: Attacking midfielder; winger; centre midfielder

Team information
- Current team: Shan United
- Number: 7

Senior career*
Years	Team	Apps	(Gls)
2018–2020	Ayeyawady United	76	(1)
2021	Yangon United	0	(0)
2022–2025	Rayong	84	(24)
2025–2026	Mahasarakham SBT	35	(8)
2026–	Shan United	0	(0)

International career^{‡}
2017	Myanmar U18	9	(1)
2018–2019	Myanmar U20	37	(5)
2017–2022	Myanmar U23	31	(7)
2018–	Myanmar	60	(6)
Medal record
Men's football
Representing Myanmar
Tri-Nation Series
Silver medal – second place	2023 India
AFF U-19 Youth Championship
Silver medal – second place	2018 Indonesia
Sea Games
Bronze medal – third place	2019 Philippines
- * Club domestic league appearances and goals as of 28 July 2026 ‡ National team caps and goals as of 4 August 2026

Lwin Moe Aung (Burmese: လွင်မိုးအောင်; born 10 December 1999) is a Burmese professional footballer who plays as an attacking midfielder or a winger for Shan United of the Myanmar National League and the Myanmar national football team. He was once the youngest football player in the Myanmar football team for the SEA Games. He won the Best Male Youth Player Award at the 2018 Myanmar National League (MNL) Awards.

== Early life ==
Lwin was born on 10 December 1999 in Thayet Tan village, Amarapura, Mandalay Region. He is the second child of three and he has one older sister and one younger brother. His father is a mushroom trader. He was crazy about football when he was young. He began joining local amateur football competitions that were held annually near Paleik Pagoda close to his village. Lwin studied in Sports and Physical Sciences Institution, Mandalay.

Lwin played in midfield when he arrived at the Sports and Physical Sciences Institution. As he was having difficulties playing in midfield, he tried to get a chance to play on the right-wing, but the manager persuaded him to stay in the midfield, so he remained a midfielder.

== Club career ==
=== Adeyawady United ===
In 2018 December, Ayeyawady United signed Lwin from I.S.P.E. He plays 37 international matches, scoring 5 goals for Myanmar U20. The young attacking midfielder proves that he has the capability to distribute from a more advanced position, especially in creating danger for his side.

=== Yangon United ===
Lwin joined Yangon United on a two-year loan deal. However, the loan contract was eventually terminated and he did not make a single appearance.

=== Rayong ===
In 2022, Lwin joined Thai League 2 team, Rayong. On 20 August 2022, he make his club debut in a league match against Ranong United. On 10 September 2022, he scored his debut goal against Chiangmai FC in a 2–0 away win. In Lwin first season with the Thai club, he recorded 12 goals and 8 assists in 32 appearances. In the following 2023-24 Thai League 2 season, Lwin scored the only goal in the opening league match against Lampang FC on 12 August 2023. The following match, he picked up an assist in a 1–0 away victory against Krabi FC.

== International career ==
In 2017, Lwin was selected to play for the national youth team. Because of his talent, he was selected for the U-23 side even though he was playing for the U-18 team at the time. Then head coach Gerd Zeise chose him for the first time for the match against Kyrgyzstan, played in South Korea, as the final match of 2019 AFC Asian Cup.

On 19 June 2023, Lwin scored his first international goal against Macau in Dalian, China.

== Club statistics ==
Appearances and goals by club team and year
Club team	Year	Apps	Goals	Assists
Ayeyawady United	2018	25	0	7
Ayeyawady United	2019	26	1	10
Ayeyawady United	2020	25	0	9
Yangon United	2021	-	-	-
Rayong	2022–2023	32	12	8
Rayong	2023–2024	34	10	8
Rayong	2024–2025	18	2	1
Mahasarakham SBT	2025–2026	35	8	4
Total		195	33	47

== International statistics ==
As of match played 4 August 2026

Age First Cap:

- (18 years 10 months 0 days 10-10-2018 vs. Indonesia 0–3)

Myanmar national team
Year	Apps	Goals	Assists
2018	7	0	0
2019	4	0	0
2020	0	0	0
2021	8	0	0
2022	7	0	1
2023	8	3	0
2024	12	2	1
2025	6	0	0
2026	8	1	2
Total	60	6	4

Goals by opponent
Opponent	Goals
Macau	3
Sri Lanka	1
Laos	2
Total	6

== International goals ==
Scores and results list Myanmar's goal tally first.

#	Date	Venue	Opponent	Score	Result	Competition
1.	19 June 2023	Dalian Pro Soccer Academy Base, Dalian, China	Macau	1–0	2–0	Friendly
2.	13 October 2023	Thuwunna Stadium, Yangon, Myanmar	Macau	1–0	5–1	2026 FIFA World Cup qualification
3.	13 October 2023	Thuwunna Stadium, Yangon, Myanmar	Macau	5–1	5–1	2026 FIFA World Cup qualification
4.	10 October 2024	Thuwunna Stadium, Yangon, Myanmar	Sri Lanka	1–0	2–0	Friendly
5.	18 December 2024	Thuwunna Stadium, Yangon, Myanmar	Laos	1–0	3–2	2024 ASEAN Championship
6.	4 August 2026	Thuwunna Stadium, Yangon, Myanmar	Laos	1–0	7–2	2026 ASEAN Championship

== Honours ==
National Team

- Tri-Nation Series (India)

- Runners-up (1):2023
