= Aung Kaung Mann =

Burmese footballer

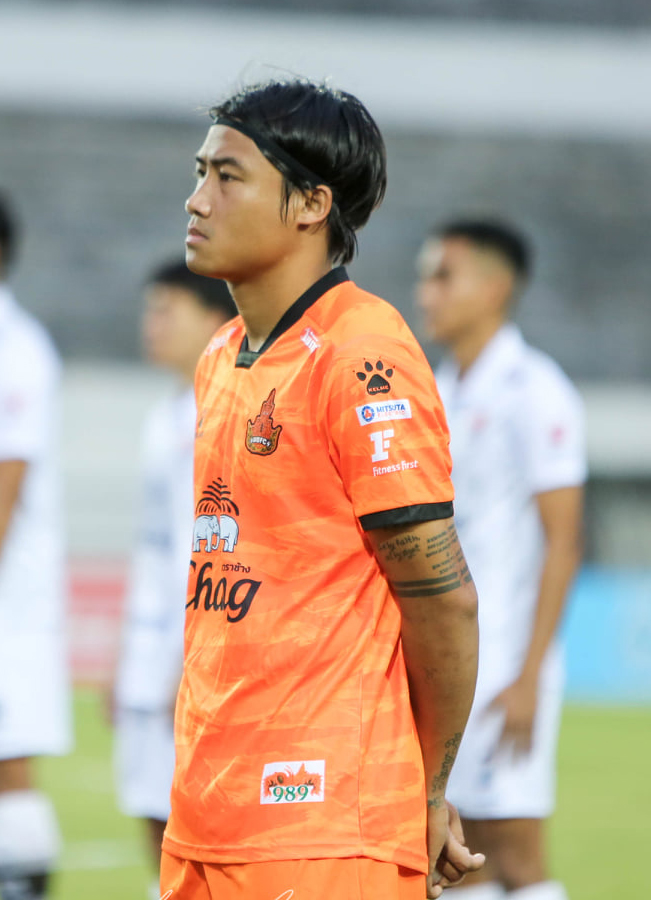
- Kaung Mann with Udon Thani in 2022

Personal information
- Full name: Aung Kaung Mann
- Date of birth: 18 February 1998 (age 28)
- Place of birth: Taungdwingyi, Myanmar
- Height: 1.82 m (5 ft 11 1/2 in)
- Positions: Forward; attacking midfielder

Team information
- Current team: Yangon City
- Number: 7

Youth career
- 2015–2017: Ayeyawady United

Senior career*
Years	Team	Apps	(Gls)
2017–2021	Ayeyawady United	66	(5)
2020	→ Trat (loan)	4	(0)
2020	→ Lampang (loan)	7	(3)
2021	→ Khon Kaen United (loan)	14	(2)
2021	Sri Pahang	6	(2)
2022	Udon Thani	32	(6)
2023–2024	Chonburi	0	(0)
2023	→ Customs United (loan)	16	(6)
2023	→ Uthai Thani (loan)	2	(0)
2024	→ Nakhon Ratchasima (loan)	13	(3)
2024–2025	Kelantan Darul Naim	4	(0)
2025	Phrae United	5	(0)
2026–	Yangon City	0	(0)

International career
2017–2022	Myanmar U23	16	(16)
2021–	Myanmar	24	(2)
Medal record
Men's football
Representing Myanmar
Tri-Nation Series
Silver medal – second place	2023 India
Sea Games
Bronze medal – third place	2019 philippines
- * Club domestic league appearances and goals

Aung Kaung Mann (Burmese: အောင်ကောင်းမာန်; born 18 February 1998) is a Burmese professional footballer who plays as a forward or an attacking midfielder.

== Club career ==
=== Ayeyawady United ===
Aung started his career at Ayeyawady United where in 2017, he was promoted to the main squad ahead of the 2017 season.

==== On loan to Trat ====
On 17 January 2020, Aung joined Thailand's first tier club Trat on loan for the remainder of the 2020–21 Thai League 1 season.

==== On loan to Lampang ====
On 29 August 2020, Aung moved to Thai League 2 side Lampang, but his deal was cut short in December 2020.

==== On loan to Khon Kaen United ====
In January 2021, Aung joined Khon Kaen United on loan till the end of the 2020–21 Thai League 2 season.

=== Sri Pahang ===
On 5 May 2021, Aung moved to Malaysia to join Sri Pahang for the remainder of the 2021 Malaysia Super League season. He scored his first goal on his debut against Perak on 9 May 2021.

=== Udon Thani ===
On 3 January 2022, Aung moved back to Thailand to join Udon Thani for the remainder of the 2021–22 Thai League 2 season.

=== Chonburi ===
On 16 January 2023, Aung moved to Thai League 1 side, Chonburi.

==== Loan to Customs United ====
The following day, Aung was loaned out to Thai League 2 side, Customs United.

==== Loan to Uthai Thani ====
On 12 July 2023, Aung was loaned out to Uthai Thani.

== International career ==
On 14 June 2022, Aung scored his first international goal against Singapore at the Dolen Omurzakov Stadium in Kyrgyzstan.

== Career statistics ==
Appearances and goals by club team and year
Club team	Year	Apps	Goals	Assists
Customs United	2023–2024	9	6	3
Total		9	6	3

As of match played 6 June 2022

Appearances and goals by U-23 national team and year
National team	Year	Apps	Goals
Myanmar U23	2017	1	2
Myanmar U23	2019	10	9
Myanmar U23	2022	5	5
Total		16	16

As of match played 21 December 2024

Appearances and goals by national team and year
National team	Year	Apps	Goals
Myanmar	2021	4	0
Myanmar	2022	7	1
Myanmar	2023	7	1
Myanmar	2024	6	0
Total		24	2

=== International goals ===
No.	Date	Venue	Opponent	Score	Result	Competition
1.	14 June 2022	Dolen Omurzakov Stadium, Bishkek, Kyrgyzstan	Singapore	2–4	2–6	2023 AFC Asian Cup qualification
2.	12 October 2023	Thuwunna Stadium, Yangon, Myanmar	Macau	3–1	5–1	2026 FIFA World Cup qualification

== Honours ==
Nakhon Ratchasima

- Thai League 2: 2023–24

National Team

- Tri-Nation Series (India)

- Runners-up (1): 2023
