= Myat Kaung Khant =

Burmese footballer

Personal information
- Full name: Myat Kaung Khant
- Date of birth: 15 July 2000 (age 26)
- Place of birth: Kyonpyaw, Myanmar
- Height: 1.70 m (5 ft 7 in)
- Position: Midfielder

Team information
- Current team: Yangon City
- Number: 10

Youth career
- 2013–2018: Myanmar Football Academy

Senior career*
| Years | Team | Apps | (Gls) |
| 2018–2019 | Yadanarbon | 35 | (12) |
| 2019–2020 | Chainat Hornbill | 2 | (0) |
| 2022–2023 | Shan United | 22 | (6) |
| 2023–2024 | → Persikabo 1973 (loan) | 16 | (2) |
| 2024–2026 | Shan United | 0 | (0) |
| 2026 - | Yangon City | 0 | (0) |

International career^{‡}
| 2016–2020 | Myanmar U20 | 24 | (13) |
| 2018–2023 | Myanmar U23 | 20 | (5) |
| 2018– | Myanmar | 34 | (2) |
Medal record
Men's football
Representing Myanmar
Tri-Nation Series
| Silver medal – second place | 2023 India |
AFF U-19 Youth Championship
| Silver medal – second place | 2018 Indonesia |
Sea Games
| Bronze medal – third place | 2019 philippines |
- * Club domestic league appearances and goals as of 28 July 2026 ‡ National team caps and goals as of 4 August 2026

Myat Kaung Khant (Burmese: မြတ်ကောင်းခန့်; born 15 July 2000) is a Burmese professional footballer who plays as a midfielder for Myanmar National League club Yangon City and the Myanmar national team.

Myat Kaung Khant was a talented home grown player of Myanmar Football Academy. In 2017, Yadanarbon signed Myat Kaung Khant with a transfer fee of 5,000,000 MMK. He officially made his debut in 2018 at the age of 17 and since then, he had been part of the senior squad. He scored his first ever professional goal on his debut game. After spending 2 years in Myanmar National League, he moved to Chainat Hornbill in Thai League 2.

== Club career ==
Myat made his first professional goal against Ayeyawady United on 8 April 2018.

On 23 December 2019, Myat signed with Thai League 2 club Chainat Hornbill. He make his debut on 14 February 2020 against Phrae United.

On 4 November 2023, Myat moved to Indonesia to signed for Persikabo 1973 on loan. He scored his first goal for the club in a 2–2 draw against Bhayangkara on 3 December. During the match against Bali United on 15 April 2024, Myat scored the winning goal in a 3–2 win helping his team to get the 3 points in the league.

== International career ==
=== Under-19 ===
Myat made his debut for the Myanmar under-19 team in 2018. He scored three out of 6 goals against the Philippines at the Phnom Penh Olympic Stadium in Cambodia.

=== Senior ===
Myat made his debut on 10 October 2018 against Indonesia in a friendly match where later, he scored his first international goal against Bahrain six days later.

Myat scored his second international goal during the 2026 ASEAN Championship fixtures against Malaysia on 25 July 2026.

== Club statistics ==
Appearances and goals by club team and year
| Club team | Year | Apps | Goals | Assists |
|---|---|---|---|---|
| Yadanarbon | 2018 | 15 | 7 | 4 |
| Yadanarbon | 2019 | 19 | 5 | 3 |
| Yadanarbon | 2020 | 11 | 0 | 4 |
| Chainat Hornbill | 2020 | 2 | 0 | 0 |
| Shan United | 2022 | 8 | 2 | 1 |
| Shan United | 2023 | 16 | 4 | 5 |
| Persikabo 1973 | 2023 | 16 | 2 | 0 |
| Total | | 77 | 20 | 17 |

== Career statistics ==
=== International ===
As of match played 4 August 2026

Appearances and goals by national team and year
| National team | Year | Apps | Goals | Assists |
|---|---|---|---|---|
| Myanmar | 2018 | 2 | 1 | 0 |
| Myanmar | 2019 | 3 | 0 | 0 |
| Myanmar | 2020 | 4 | 0 | 0 |
| Myanmar | 2021 | 4 | 0 | 1 |
| Myanmar | 2022 | 7 | 0 | 0 |
| Myanmar | 2023 | 3 | 0 | 0 |
| Myanmar | 2024 | 2 | 0 | 0 |
| Myanmar | 2025 | 3 | 0 | 0 |
| Myanmar | 2026 | 6 | 1 | 2 |
| Total | | 34 | 2 | 3 |

=== International goals ===
Scores and results list Myanmar's goal tally first.

| No. | Date | Venue | Opponent | Score | Result | Competition |
|---|---|---|---|---|---|---|
| 1 | 16 October 2018 | Bahrain National Stadium, Riffa, Bahrain | Bahrain | 1–2 | 1–4 | Friendly |
| 2 | 25 July 2026 | Thuwunna Stadium, Yangon, Myanmar | Malaysia | 1–0 | 1–2 | 2026 ASEAN Championship |

== Honours ==
National Team

- Tri-Nation Series (India)

- Runners-up (1):2023

Shan United

- Myanmar National League (1): 2022
