= Ye Yint Aung =

Ye Yint Aung may refer to:

- Yair Yint Aung (born 1993), Burmese singer and actor
- Ye Yint Aung (footballer, born 1998), Burmese football defender
- Ye Yint Aung (footballer, born 2000), Burmese football winger
