= Win Naing Tun =

Burmese footballer

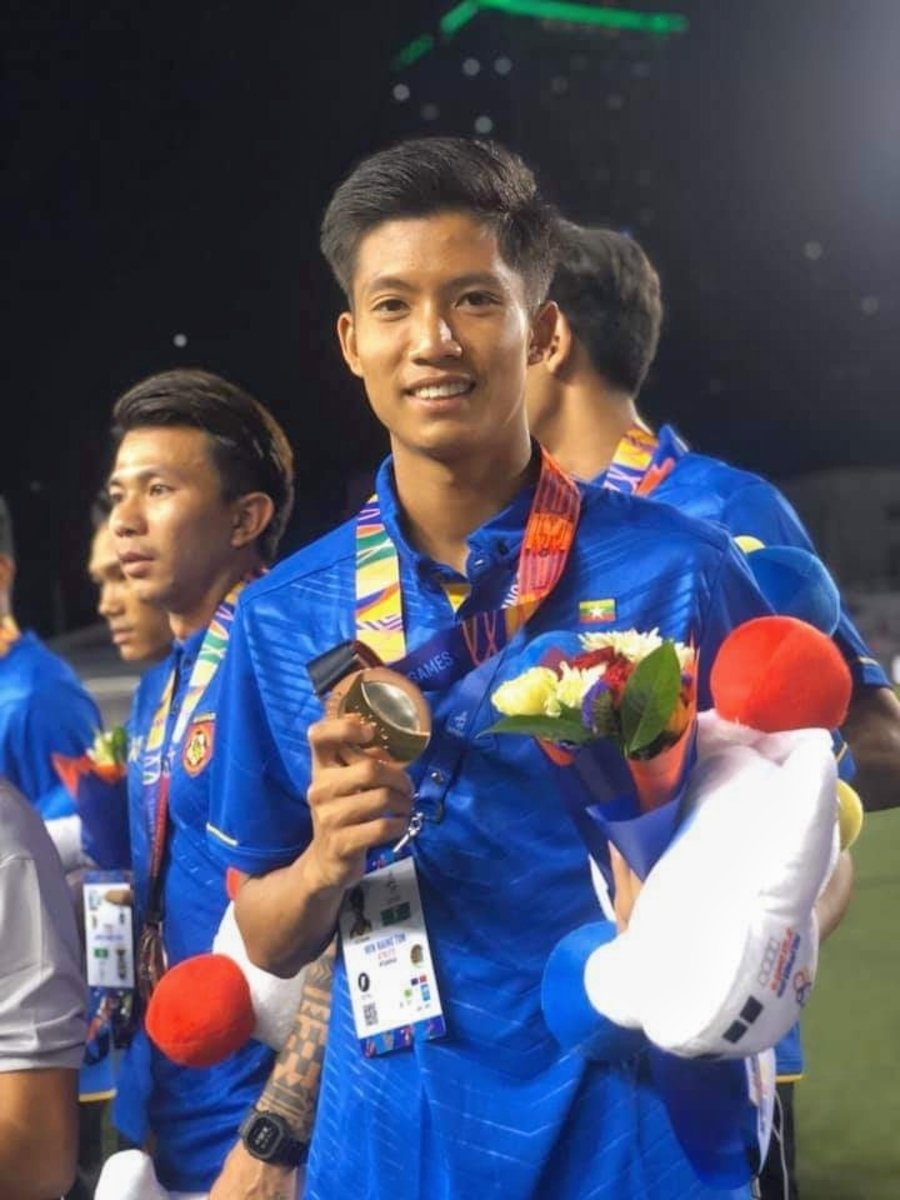
- Naing Tun with Myanmar U23 in 2019

Personal information
- Full name: Win Naing Tun
- Date of birth: 3 May 2000 (age 26)
- Place of birth: Depayin, Myanmar
- Height: 1.82 m (6 ft 0 in)
- Position: Forward

Team information
- Current team: Yangon City
- Number: 77

Youth career
- 2011–2015: Myanmar Football Academy

Senior career*
Years	Team	Apps	(Gls)
2017–2019	Yadanarbon	24	(11)
2020	Ayeyawady United	5	(0)
2021–2023	Yangon United	15	(11)
2023–2024	Borneo Samarinda	25	(0)
2024–2025	Chiangrai United	13	(0)
2026–	Yangon City	0	(0)

International career^{‡}
2017	Myanmar U18	6	(7)
2016–2019	Myanmar U20	33	(25)
2018–2023	Myanmar U23	18	(10)
2021–	Myanmar	50	(13)
Medal record
Men's football
Representing Myanmar
Tri-Nation Series
Silver medal – second place	2023 India
AFF U-19 Youth Championship
Silver medal – second place	2018 Indonesia
Sea Games
Bronze medal – third place	2019 Philippines
- * Club domestic league appearances and goals as of 19 July 2026 ‡ National team caps and goals as of 24 September 2026

Win Naing Tun (Burmese: ဝင်းနိုင်ထွန်း; born 3 May 2000) is a Burmese professional footballer who plays as a forward for Yangon City and the Myanmar national team.

== Early life ==
Win Naing Tun was born on 3 May 2000 in Saipyingyi Village, Depayin in Sagaing Region. He went to the Myanmar Football Academy.

== Club career ==
=== Yadanarbon ===
In 2017, Yadanarbon signed Win Naing Tun from the Myanmar Football Academy. He make his first professional career debut in a 5–2 win over Ayeyawady United on 15 January 2018. Win scored his first career goal in a 3–2 lost against Shan United on 10 June. In December, he received the best player award at the Thanh Niên Newspaper International U-21 Football Tournament held in Vietnam. He won the 'Player of the Month' award in January during the 2019 Myanmar National League.

=== Ayeyawady United ===
On 8 January 2020, Win signed for Ayeyawady United. He make his debut in a goalless draw against Magwe on 11 January.

=== Yangon United ===
In January 2021, Win signed for Yangon United but the league was cancelled for the year. Win played his first match against Shan United on 6 August 2022 but got sent off in the first ten minutes. He scored his first goal against Mahar United on 5 September in a 3–0 win. On 2 October, Win scored his first professional career hat-trick where he scored five in a 10–0 battering against relegation-candidates Rakhine United.

=== Borneo Samarinda ===
In July 2023, Win decided to go abroad for the first time to Indonesia and joined Liga 1 side Borneo Samarinda for the 2023–24 season. He make his debut on 3 July becoming the first Myanmar professional footballer to play in Indonesia in a 1–1 draw to Persik Kediri.

== International career ==
In December 2018, Win received the best player award at the Thanh Niên Newspaper International U-21 Football Tournament held in Vietnam.

=== Senior ===
On 28 May 2021, Win made his debut for Myanmar during the 2022 FIFA World Cup qualification in a 10–0 thrashing defeat to Japan. Win was then called up for the delayed 2020 AFF Championship in December.

On 14 June 2022, Win scored his first goal for Myanmar in a 2–6 loss to Singapore during the 2023 AFC Asian Cup qualification in Bishkek.

In addition to his club successes in 2022, Win was called up to represent Myanmar in the 2022 AFF Championship. However, he failed to make an impact, missing a penalty in the opening match against Malaysia and failing to make an appearance for the match against Vietnam.

During the 2024 ASEAN Championship match against Laos, as Myanmar was losing 2–1, Win scored a brace in the 87th and 90+3rd minute to rescue Myanmar to a 3–2 comeback thus earning the three points in the group stage.

During the 2026 ASEAN Championship On August 4, 2026, he scored his first international hat-trick in a match against the Laos.

== Career statistics ==
=== Club ===
As of 19 July 2026

Club	Season	League			Cup		Continental		Other		Total	
Club	Season	Division	Apps	Goals	Apps	Goals	Apps	Goals	Apps	Goals	Apps	Goals
Yadanarbon	2018	Myanmar National League	9	1	0	0	—		—		9	1
Yadanarbon	2019	Myanmar National League	15	10	0	0	—		—		15	10
Yadanarbon	Total		24	11	0	0	—		—		24	11
Ayeyawady United	2020	Myanmar National League	5	0	0	0	—		—		5	0
Yangon United	2022	Myanmar National League	10	6	0	0	—		—		10	6
Yangon United	2023	Myanmar National League	5	5	0	0	—		—		5	5
Yangon United	Total		15	11	0	0	—		—		15	11
Borneo Samarinda	2023–24	Liga 1	25	0	0	0	—		—		25	0
Chiangrai United	2024–25	Thai League One	14	1	0	0	—		—		25	0
Career total			83	23	0	0	0	0	0	0	83	23

=== International ===
As of 24 September 2026

Appearances and goals by national team and year
National team	Year	Apps	Goals	Assists
Myanmar	2021	9	0	0
Myanmar	2022	12	1	0
Myanmar	2023	12	2	1
Myanmar	2024	6	2	1
Myanmar	2025	3	0	1
Myanmar	2026	8	8	2
Total		50	13	5

List of international goals scored by Win Naing Tun
No.	Date	Venue	Opponent	Score	Result	Competition
1.	14 June 2022	Dolen Omurzakov Stadium, Bishkek, Kyrgyzstan	Singapore	1–3	2–6	2023 AFC Asian Cup qualification
2.	11 September 2023	Thuwunna Stadium, Yangon, Myanmar	Nepal	1–0	1–0	Friendly
3.	21 November 2023	Thuwunna Stadium, Yangon, Myanmar	North Korea	1–6	1–6	2026 FIFA World Cup qualification
4.	18 December 2024	Thuwunna Stadium, Yangon, Myanmar	Laos	2–2	3–2	2024 ASEAN Championship
5.	18 December 2024	Thuwunna Stadium, Yangon, Myanmar	Laos	3–2	3–2	2024 ASEAN Championship
6.	6 June 2026	Rizal Memorial Stadium, Manila, Philippines	Guam	3–0	6–1	Friendly
7.	6 June 2026	Rizal Memorial Stadium, Manila, Philippines	Guam	4–0	6–1	Friendly
8.	9 June 2026	Rizal Memorial Stadium, Manila, Philippines	Philippines	1–5	1–5	Friendly
9.	28 July 2026	New Clark City Athletics Stadium, Capas, Philippines	Philippines	3–1	4–1	2026 ASEAN Championship
10.	4 August 2026	Thuwunna Stadium, Yangon, Myanmar	Laos	2–1	7–2	2026 ASEAN Championship
11.	4 August 2026	Thuwunna Stadium, Yangon, Myanmar	Laos	3–2	7–2	2026 ASEAN Championship
12.	4 August 2026	Thuwunna Stadium, Yangon, Myanmar	Laos	7–2	7–2	2026 ASEAN Championship
13.	24 September 2026	Mong Kok Stadium, Kowloon, Hong Kong	Timor-Leste	1–0	2–0	2026 FIFA ASEAN Cup

== Honours ==
=== Club ===
==== Borneo Samarinda ====
- Liga 1 Winner Regular Series: 2023–24
- Liga 1 3rd Place Championship Series: 2023–24

=== International ===
==== Myanmar ====
- Tri-Nation Series runners-up: 2023

==== Myanmar U23 ====
- SEA Games bronze medal: 2019

==== Myanmar U19 ====
- AFF U-19 Youth Championship runner-up: 2018

=== Individual ===
- International Thanh Niên Newspaper Cup Best Player: 2018
- AFF U-19 Youth Championship top scorer: 2018
- Southeast Asian Games top scorer: 2021
