= Aung Thu (footballer) =

Burmese footballer

Aung Thu အောင်သူ
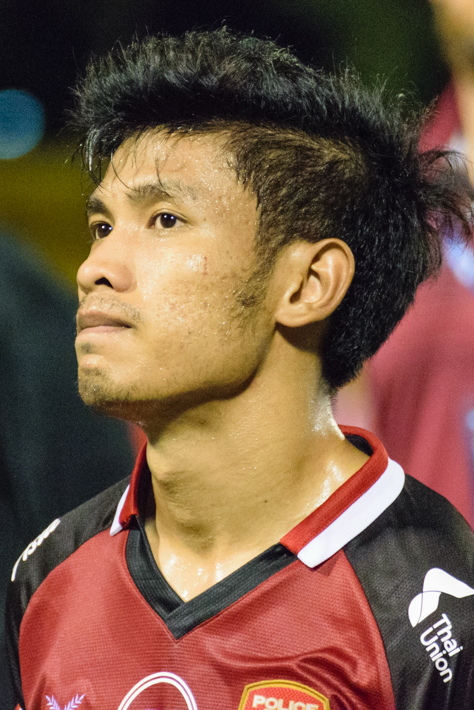
- Thu with Police Tero in 2018

Personal information
- Full name: Aung Thu
- Date of birth: 22 May 1996 (age 30)
- Place of birth: Pindale Village, Meiktila Township, Mandalay Region
- Height: 1.68 m (5 ft 6 in)
- Positions: Attacking midfielder; winger

Youth career
- 2011–2013: Mandalay Football Academy

Senior career*
Years	Team	Apps	(Gls)
2013–2020	Yadanarbon	131	(34)
2018	→ Police Tero (loan)	30	(11)
2019	→ Muangthong United (loan)	13	(3)
2020–2022	Buriram United	35	(4)
2023	Lamphun Warriors	13	(1)
2023–2025	Uthai Thani	48	(6)

International career^{‡}
2011	Myanmar U16	4	(4)
2013–2017	Myanmar U20	19	(12)
2017–2018	Myanmar U23	16	(5)
2015–	Myanmar	48	(11)
- * Club domestic league appearances and goals as of 20 January 2023 ‡ National team caps and goals as of 21 November 2023

Aung Thu (Burmese: အောင်သူ; born 22 May 1995) is a Burmese professional footballer who plays as an attacking midfielder or a winger for Thai League 1 club Uthai Thani and Myanmar national team. He has represented Myanmar internationally at under-17, under-20, under-23, and senior level. Representing Myanmar at the 2015 FIFA U-20 World Cup in New Zealand, he scored his debut World Cup goal against New Zealand national under-20 football team.

== Early life ==
He was born in Pindale Village of Meiktila Township, Myanmar. Later he moved to Pyinmana.

== Club career ==
=== Early career ===
In 2009, at the age of 13, Aung Thu represented Pyinmana in U-19 Division Tournament with 3 goals. He later joined the Myanmar Football Academy in Mandalay and was graduated from the academy.

=== Yadanarbon ===
In 2013, Yadanarbon F.C signed Aung Thu from Myanmar Football Academy (Mandalay). He showed an impressive talent in Yadanarbon F.C that increased his value to the whole team by achieving a less than anticipated goal count by assisting other teammates in making goals.

At the 2016 and 2017 MNL Awards Night, he was recognized as the MNL Best Player of the Year.

==== Police Tero (loan) ====
In November 2017, Aung Thu signed on as a loan for Thailand club Police Tero formally known as BEC Tero Sasana for the 2018 season. He scored goals and assisted others in theirs; he was recognized as the league player of the month. His goal during the Thai League Week 11 against Sukhothai FC is considered one of the top 5 goals of the round.

==== Muangthong United (loan) ====
Aung Thu joined Muangthong United on loan for the 2019 season with options.

==== Buriram United ====
In December 2020, Aung Thu signed for Thai League Giant Club Buriram United for US$50,000. On 26 December 2020, he made his debut with Buriram United in 2–0 away win against Chonburi. In December 2022, Aung Thu cancelled the contract with Buriram United.

==== Lamphun Warriors F.C. ====
After cancelled the contract with Buriram United.Aung Thu signed for Thai League 1 Club Lamphun Warriors.

==== Uthai Thani ====
On 12 July 2023, Aung Thu signed for Thai League 1 Club Uthai Thani.

=== Club ===
Appearances and goals by club team and year
Club team	Year	Apps	Goals	Assists
Lamphun Warriors	2022–2023	13	1	3
Uthai Thani	2023–2024	16	2	1
Total		29	3	4

== International career ==
=== Youth ===
Aung Thu debuted in national U-16 team that took part in 2011 AFF U-16 Youth Championship.

In 2014, his crucial goal against U-19 Vietnam at the Hassanal Bolkiah Trophy tournament for ASEAN Youth Football Championship in Brunei and would lead Myanmar to emerge as the champion of 2014 Hassanal Bolkiah Trophy. He then became a Myanmar Fans' favorite striker. His performance led Myanmar to the international participation and the U-19 Myanmar National team participation to the FIFA U-20 World Cup, and it was Myanmar's first international football match after its last participation in the 1972 Summer Olympics in Munich, Germany. He was noted for his powerful shots and intelligent runs in FIFA technical study book of 2015 FIFA U-20 World Cup.

=== Senior ===
He made his international debut in Myanmar national team on 28 August 2015 against United Arab Emirates national football team in a friendly tournament. His first goal as a Myanmar national team player was scoring against Laos, 3–1 in 2018 FIFA World Cup qualification.

== Internationals goals and apps ==
– Internationals goals and apps
Team	Internationals	Goals	apps
Yadanarbon FC	AFC Champions League	0	1
Yadanarbon FC	AFC Champions League 2	1	4

– Internationals goals and apps
National Team	Internationals	Goals	apps
Myanmar U20	FIFA U20 World Cup	1	3

== International statistics ==
As of match played 21 November 2023

Debut: Age ( 19 years 03 months 06 days )

Appearances and goals by national team and year
National team	Year	Apps	Goals	Assists
Myanmar	2015	6	1	0
Myanmar	2016	12	3	0
Myanmar	2017	7	4	3
Myanmar	2018	6	1	2
Myanmar	2019	10	1	3
Myanmar	2023	5	1	0
Total		48	11	8

Goals by opponent
Opponent	Goals
Cambodia	2
Kyrgyzstan	2
Laos	2
Lebanon	1
Singapore	1
Tajikistan	1
Thailand	1
Vietnam	1
Total	11

=== International goals ===
Scores and results list Myanmar's goal tally first.

#	Date	Venue	Opponent	Score	Result	Competition
1.	13 October 2015	Supachalasai Stadium, Bangkok	Laos	3–1	3–1	2018 FIFA World Cup qualification
2.	29 March 2016	Saida Municipal Stadium, Sidon	Lebanon	1–0	1–1	2018 FIFA World Cup qualification
3.	20 November 2016	Thuwunna Stadium, Yangon	Vietnam	1–1	1–2	2016 AFF Championship
4.	23 November 2016	Thuwunna Stadium, Yangon	Cambodia	3–1	3–1	2016 AFF Championship
5.	6 June 2017	Jalan Besar Stadium, Kallang	Singapore	1–0	1–1	Friendly
6.	5 October 2017	Mandalarthiri Stadium, Mandalay	Thailand	1–2	1–3	Friendly
7.	10 October 2017	Thuwunna Stadium, Yangon	Kyrgyzstan	1–2	2–2	2019 AFC Asian Cup qualification
8.	9 November 2017	Olympic Stadium, Phnom Penh	Cambodia	2–1	2–1	Friendly
9.	16 November 2018	New Laos National Stadium, Vientiane	Laos	1–1	3–1	2018 AFF Championship
10.	14 November 2019	Mandalarthiri Stadium, Mandalay	Tajikistan	3–1	4–3	2022 FIFA World Cup qualification
11.	25 March 2023	Khuman Lampak Main Stadium, Imphal	Kyrgyzstan	1–1	1–1	Friendly

== Honours ==
National Team

- Tri-Nation Series (India)

- Runners-up (1):2023

- FIFA World Cup
  - Group Stage (1): 2015
- Brunei King's Cup
  - Champion (1): 2014
- AFC U19 Championship
  - Semi-finalist: 2014
- Top Soccer (1):2023

=== Club ===
Yadanarbon

- Myanmar National League: 2016

Buriram United

- Thai League 1: 2021–22
- Thai FA Cup: 2021–22
- Thai League Cup: 2021–22

=== Individual ===
- AFF Youth Player of the Year: 2015
- Myanmar Player of the Year: 2014, 2015, 2016, 2017
- Myanmar National League Player of the Year: 2015, 2016, 2017
- Thai League Dream ASEAN XI

=== International ===
Myanmar U20

- Hassanal Bolkiah Trophy: 2014

== Personal life ==
Aung Thu married Burmese actress Poe Ei Ei Khant on 31 May 2018; the wedding ceremony was held on 26 March 2019 at the Western Park. They gave birth to their first son Thwin Oo Han on 19 July 2019.
