= 2023 Tri-Nation Series (India) =

2023 Hero Tri-Nation Series
Tournament details
- Host country: India
- Dates: 22–28 March 2023
- Teams: 3 (from 1 confederation)
- Venue: 1 (in 1 host city)

Final positions
- Champions: India (2nd title)
- Runners-up: Myanmar
- Third place: Kyrgyzstan

Tournament statistics
- Matches played: 3
- Goals scored: 5 (1.67 per match)
- Top scorer(s): (Myanmar) Aung Thu (India) Anirudh Thapa (India) Sunil Chhetri (India) Sandesh Jhingan (Kyrgyzstan) Kayrat Zhyrgalbek uulu [1 Goal]
- Best player: (India) Lallianzuala Chhangte
- Best goalkeeper: (India) Amrinder Singh (India) Gurpreet Singh Sandhu

The 2023 Hero Tri-Nation Series (also 2023 Hero Tri-Nation International Football Tournament) was the second edition of the Tri-Nation Series, a 3-team association football tournament held at the Khuman Lampak Main Stadium in the Indian city of Imphal between the 22nd and 28th of March 2023. The tournament was organized by the AIFF as part of the senior men team's preparation for 2023 AFC Asian Cup. India won the tournament with a 2–0 win over Kyrgyzstan on the final matchday.

== Participating nations ==
With FIFA Rankings, as of March 22, 2023.

- India (106) - second appearance - hosts
- Kyrgyzstan (94) - first appearance
- Myanmar (159) - first appearance

== Venue ==
- All matches held at the Khuman Lampak Main Stadium, Imphal, India.

Imphal	2023 Tri-Nation Series (India) is located in India
Khuman Lampak Main Stadium	2023 Tri-Nation Series (India) is located in India
24°48′49″N 93°57′00″E	2023 Tri-Nation Series (India) is located in India
Capacity: 35,285 seats	2023 Tri-Nation Series (India) is located in India

== Standings ==
Pos	Team	Pld	W	D	L	GF	GA	GD	Pts	
1	India (C)	2	2	0	0	3	0	+3	6	Champion
2	Myanmar	2	0	1	1	1	2	−1	1	
3	Kyrgyzstan	2	0	1	1	1	3	−2	1	

Source: GSA
(C) Champions

== Matches ==
22 March 2023
18:00 UTC+5:30

India	1–0	Myanmar
Thapa 45+1'	Report

Khuman Lampak Main Stadium, Imphal, India
Attendance: 29,431
Referee: Md Alamgir Sarker (Bangladesh)
25 March 2023
18:00 UTC+5:30

Myanmar	1–1	Kyrgyzstan
Aung Thu 82'	Report	Zhyrgalbek uulu 90+6'

Khuman Lampak Main Stadium, Imphal, India
Attendance: 9,563
Referee: Nasir Uddin (Bangladesh)
28 March 2023
18:00 UTC+5:30

Kyrgyzstan	0–2	India
	Report	Jhingan 34'; Chhetri 83' (pen.)

Khuman Lampak Main Stadium, Imphal, India
Attendance: 29,877
Referee: Md Alamgir Sarker (Bangladesh)

== Winners ==
2023 Tri-Nation Series champion

India
Second title

== Goalscorers ==
1 goal

- (Myanmar) Aung Thu
- (India) Anirudh Thapa
- (India) Sandesh Jhingan
- (India) Sunil Chhetri
- (Kyrgyzstan) Kayrat Zhyrgalbek uulu
