= 2010 AFF Championship squads =

Association football competition squads

Below are the squads for the 2010 AFF Championship, co-hosted by Indonesia and Vietnam, which took place between 1 and 29 December 2010. Table below lists the player's total caps, their club teams and their age on the tournament's opening day.

== Group A ==
=== Indonesia ===
Head coach: (Austria) Alfred Riedl

No.	Pos.	Player	Date of birth (age)	Caps	Club
1	GK	Markus Haris Maulana	14 March 1981 (aged 29)	26	(Indonesia) Persib Bandung
2	DF	Mohammad Nasuha	15 September 1984 (aged 26)	6	(Indonesia) Persija Jakarta
3	DF	Zulkifli Syukur	3 May 1984 (aged 26)	3	Arema Indonesia
5	DF	Maman Abdurahman	12 May 1982 (aged 28)	20	(Indonesia) Persib Bandung
6	MF	Tony Sucipto	12 February 1986 (aged 24)	4	(Indonesia) Persija Jakarta
7	DF	Beny Wahyudi	20 March 1986 (aged 24)	3	Arema Indonesia
8	MF	Eka Ramdani	18 June 1984 (aged 26)	19	(Indonesia) Persib Bandung
9	FW	Cristian Gonzáles	30 August 1976 (aged 34)	3	(Indonesia) Persib Bandung
10	FW	Oktovianus Maniani	10 October 1990 (aged 20)	5	(Indonesia) Sriwijaya
11	MF	Johan Juansyah	23 October 1988 (aged 22)	1	(Indonesia) Persijap Jepara
12	GK	Ferry Rotinsulu	28 December 1982 (aged 27)	3	(Indonesia) Sriwijaya
13	FW	Budi Sudarsono^{WD}	19 September 1979 (aged 31)	46	(Indonesia) Sriwijaya
14	FW	Arif Suyono	3 January 1984 (aged 26)	15	(Indonesia) Sriwijaya
15	MF	Firman Utina	15 December 1981 (aged 28)	38	(Indonesia) Sriwijaya
16	DF	Muhammad Roby	12 September 1985 (aged 25)	12	(Indonesia) Persisam Putra Samarinda
17	FW	Irfan Bachdim	11 August 1988 (aged 22)	3	(Indonesia) Persema Malang
18	GK	Kurnia Meiga	7 May 1990 (aged 20)	0	Arema Indonesia
19	MF	Ahmad Bustomi	13 July 1985 (aged 25)	5	Arema Indonesia
20	FW	Bambang Pamungkas (captain)	10 June 1980 (aged 30)	71	(Indonesia) Persija Jakarta
21	FW	Yongki Aribowo	23 November 1989 (aged 21)	4	Arema Indonesia
22	FW	Muhammad Ridwan	8 June 1980 (aged 30)	35	(Indonesia) Sriwijaya
23	DF	Hamka Hamzah	29 January 1984 (aged 26)	11	(Indonesia) Persipura Jayapura
27	DF	Yesaya Desnam	25 June 1985 (aged 25)	1	(Indonesia) Persiwa Wamena

=== Thailand ===
Head coach: (England) Bryan Robson

No.	Pos.	Player	Date of birth (age)	Caps	Club
1	GK	Sivaruck Tedsungnoen	20 April 1984 (aged 26)	7	(Thailand) Buriram PEA
2	DF	Suree Sukha	27 July 1982 (aged 28)	54	(Thailand) Chonburi
3	DF	Natthaphong Samana	29 June 1984 (aged 26)	36	(Thailand) Chonburi
4	DF	Cholratit Jantakam	2 June 1985 (aged 25)	17	(Thailand) Chonburi
5	DF	Suttinan Phuk-hom	29 November 1987 (aged 23)	9	(Thailand) Chonburi
6	DF	Nattaporn Phanrit	11 January 1982 (aged 28)	58	(Thailand) Muangthong United
7	MF	Datsakorn Thonglao	30 December 1983 (aged 26)	71	(Thailand) Muangthong United
8	MF	Suchao Nuchnum	17 May 1983 (aged 27)	47	(Thailand) Buriram PEA
9	FW	Sarayoot Chaikamdee	24 September 1981 (aged 29)	43	(Thailand) Thai Port
10	FW	Teerasil Dangda	6 June 1988 (aged 22)	32	(Thailand) Muangthong United
11	MF	Rangsan Viwatchaichok	22 January 1979 (aged 31)	22	(Thailand) Buriram PEA
13	MF	Therdsak Chaiman (captain)	29 September 1973 (aged 37)	70	(Thailand) Chonburi
14	FW	Teeratep Winothai	16 February 1985 (aged 25)	41	(Thailand) BEC Tero Sasana
15	MF	Surat Sukha	27 July 1982 (aged 28)	67	(Australia) Melbourne Victory
17	MF	Sutee Suksomkit	5 June 1978 (aged 32)	67	(Thailand) Bangkok Glass
18	GK	Sinthaweechai Hathairattanakool	23 March 1982 (aged 28)	54	(Thailand) Chonburi
19	MF	Phichitphong Choeichiu	28 August 1982 (aged 28)	49	(Thailand) Muangthong United
20	DF	Panupong Wongsa	23 November 1983 (aged 27)	14	(Thailand) Muangthong United
21	DF	Theerathon Bunmathan	6 February 1990 (aged 20)	2	(Thailand) Buriram PEA
25	FW	Kirati Keawsombut	12 January 1987 (aged 23)	8	(Thailand) Buriram PEA
27	MF	Wichaya Dechmitr	3 August 1989 (aged 21)	2	(Thailand) Bangkok Glass
28	MF	Naruphol Ar-Romsawa	16 September 1988 (aged 22)	0	(Thailand) Muangthong United

=== Malaysia ===
Head coach: K. Rajagopal

No.	Pos.	Player	Date of birth (age)	Caps	Club
2	DF	Mohd Sabre Mat Abu	8 August 1987 (aged 23)	9	(Malaysia) Kedah
3	DF	Mohd Faizal Muhammad	3 March 1989 (aged 21)	1	(Malaysia) Harimau Muda A
4	DF	Asraruddin Putra Omar	26 March 1988 (aged 22)	12	(Malaysia) Selangor
5	DF	Mohd Razman Roslan	14 August 1984 (aged 26)	0	(Malaysia) Selangor
7	DF	Khairul Helmi Johari	31 March 1988 (aged 22)	0	(Malaysia) Kedah
8	MF	Mohd Safiq Rahim (captain)	5 July 1987 (aged 23)	10	(Malaysia) Selangor
9	FW	Norshahrul Idlan Talaha	8 June 1986 (aged 24)	10	(Malaysia) Kelantan
10	FW	Safee Sali	29 January 1984 (aged 26)	20	(Malaysia) Selangor
12	MF	Amar Rohidan	23 April 1987 (aged 23)	6	(Malaysia) Perlis
14	MF	Khyril Muhymeen Zambri	9 May 1987 (aged 23)	17	(Malaysia) Kedah
15	MF	K. Gurusamy	20 November 1988 (aged 22)	1	(Malaysia) Harimau Muda A
16	MF	S. Kunanlan	22 August 1986 (aged 24)	8	(Malaysia) Negeri Sembilan
17	FW	Mohd Amri Yahyah	21 January 1981 (aged 29)	11	(Malaysia) Selangor
18	FW	Mahali Jasuli	2 April 1989 (aged 21)	6	(Malaysia) Harimau Muda A
19	MF	Mohd Faizal Abu Bakar	20 September 1990 (aged 20)	1	(Malaysia) Kedah
20	FW	Izzaq Faris Ramlan	18 April 1990 (aged 20)	1	(Malaysia) Harimau Muda A
21	MF	Amirul Hadi Zainal	27 May 1986 (aged 24)	16	(Malaysia) Selangor
22	GK	Khairul Fahmi Che Mat	7 February 1989 (aged 21)	1	(Malaysia) Kelantan
24	DF	Muslim Ahmad	25 April 1989 (aged 21)	8	(Malaysia) Harimau Muda A
26	FW	Ashaari Shamsuddin	7 June 1985 (aged 25)	8	(Malaysia) Terengganu
27	DF	Fadhli Shas	21 January 1991 (aged 19)	1	(Malaysia) Harimau Muda A
28	GK	Sharbinee Allawee	12 December 1986 (aged 23)	2	(Malaysia) Terengganu

=== Laos ===
Head coach: (England) David Booth

No.	Pos.	Player	Date of birth (age)	Caps	Club
1	GK	Sengphachan Bounthisanh	1 June 1987 (aged 23)		(Laos) Vientiane Capital
2	DF	Saynakhonevieng Phommapanya	28 October 1987 (aged 23)		(Laos) MCTPC
3	DF	Kitsada Thongkhen (captain)	8 April 1987 (aged 23)		(Laos) MCTPC
4	DF	Ketsada Souksavanh	23 November 1992 (aged 18)		(Laos) Ezra
5	DF	Khamla Pinkeo	23 November 1990 (aged 20)		(Laos) Lao Police
7	MF	Phatthana Syvilay	4 October 1990 (aged 20)		(Laos) MCTPC
8	FW	Lamnao Singto	15 April 1988 (aged 22)		(Laos) MCTPC
9	FW	Visay Phaphouvanin	12 June 1985 (aged 25)		(Laos) Vientiane Capital
10	FW	Kanlaya Sysomvang	3 November 1990 (aged 20)		(Laos) MCTPC
11	MF	Keoviengphet Liththideth	30 November 1992 (aged 18)		(Laos) Ezra
13	MF	Kaysone Soukhavong	7 June 1987 (aged 23)		(Laos) Lao Banks
14	MF	Konekham Inthammavong	10 July 1992 (aged 18)		(Laos) Lao Banks
16	DF	Senlati Vongsouriyasack	7 April 1990 (aged 20)		(Laos) Lao Banks
17	MF	Phonepaseuth Sysoutham	28 May 1990 (aged 20)		(Laos) Vientiane Capital
18	GK	Sourasay Keosouvandeng	20 February 1992 (aged 18)		(Laos) MCTPC
19	DF	Kovanh Namthavixay	23 July 1987 (aged 23)		(Laos) Lao Army
20	MF	Soukaphone Vongchiengkham	9 March 1992 (aged 18)		(Laos) Ezra
22	MF	Manolom Phomsouvanh	26 September 1992 (aged 18)		(Laos) Ezra
24	MF	Viengsavanh Sayyaboun	3 June 1989 (aged 21)		(Laos) Lao Army
25	FW	Khampheng Sayavutthi	19 July 1986 (aged 24)		(Laos) MCTPC
28	GK	Seng Athit Somvang	2 June 1991 (aged 19)		(Laos) Lao Police
29	DF	Khamphoumy Hanvilay	28 October 1987 (aged 23)		(Laos) MCTPC

== Group B ==
=== Vietnam ===
Head coach: (Portugal) Henrique Calisto

No.	Pos.	Player	Date of birth (age)	Caps	Club
1	GK	Dương Hồng Sơn	20 November 1982 (aged 28)	28	(Vietnam) Hà Nội T&T
2	DF	Đoàn Việt Cường	1 January 1985 (aged 25)	19	(Vietnam) Hoàng Anh Gia Lai
3	DF	Nguyễn Huy Hoàng	4 January 1981 (aged 29)		(Vietnam) Sông Lam Nghệ An
4	DF	Lê Phước Tứ	15 April 1984 (aged 26)	18	(Vietnam) Thanh Hóa
5	MF	Nguyễn Minh Châu	9 January 1985 (aged 25)	15	(Vietnam) Hải Phòng
6	DF	Trần Đình Đồng	20 May 1987 (aged 23)		(Vietnam) Sông Lam Nghệ An
7	DF	Vũ Như Thành	28 August 1981 (aged 29)	35	(Vietnam) XM The Vissai Ninh Bình
8	FW	Nguyễn Việt Thắng	13 September 1981 (aged 29)	25	(Vietnam) XM The Vissai Ninh Bình
11	MF	Nguyễn Trọng Hoàng	14 April 1989 (aged 21)	5	(Vietnam) Sông Lam Nghệ An
12	MF	Nguyễn Minh Phương (captain)	5 July 1980 (aged 30)	44	(Vietnam) Đồng Tâm Long An
13	FW	Nguyễn Quang Hải	1 November 1985 (aged 25)	18	(Vietnam) Khatoco Khánh Hòa
14	MF	Lê Tấn Tài	4 January 1984 (aged 26)	34	(Vietnam) Khatoco Khánh Hòa
16	DF	Huỳnh Quang Thanh	10 October 1984 (aged 26)	19	(Vietnam) Becamex Bình Dương
17	MF	Nguyễn Vũ Phong	6 February 1985 (aged 25)	32	(Vietnam) Becamex Bình Dương
19	MF	Phạm Thành Lương	10 September 1988 (aged 22)	18	(Vietnam) Hà Nội ACB
20	DF	Trương Đình Luật	12 November 1983 (aged 27)		(Vietnam) Navibank Sài Gòn
22	MF	Phan Văn Tài Em	23 April 1982 (aged 28)	48	(Vietnam) Đồng Tâm Long An
25	GK	Bùi Tấn Trường	19 February 1986 (aged 24)	0	(Vietnam) TĐCS Đồng Tháp
26	FW	Lê Sỹ Mạnh	25 June 1984 (aged 26)		(Vietnam) Quảng Nam
28	MF	Đinh Thanh Trung	24 January 1988 (aged 22)	0	(Vietnam) Hòa Phát Hà Nội
30	FW	Nguyễn Anh Đức	25 January 1985 (aged 25)	10	(Vietnam) Becamex Bình Dương

=== Singapore ===
Head coach: (Serbia) Radojko Avramović

No.	Pos.	Player	Date of birth (age)	Caps	Club
1	GK	Hassan Sunny	2 April 1984 (aged 26)	30	(Singapore) Tampines Rovers
2	MF	Ridhuan Muhammad	6 May 1984 (aged 26)	62	Arema Indonesia
3	DF	Baihakki Khaizan	31 January 1984 (aged 26)	79	(Indonesia) Persib Bandung
4	MF	Isa Halim	15 May 1986 (aged 24)	30	(Singapore) Home United
5	DF	Noh Rahman	2 August 1980 (aged 30)	75	(Singapore) SAFFC
6	DF	Precious Emuejeraye	21 March 1983 (aged 27)	59	(Indonesia) Persija Jakarta
8	FW	Noh Alam Shah	3 September 1980 (aged 30)	81	Arema Indonesia
9	FW	Aleksandar Đurić	12 August 1970 (aged 40)	30	(Singapore) Tampines Rovers
10	FW	Fazrul Nawaz	17 April 1985 (aged 25)	43	(Singapore) Gombak United
11	FW	Agu Casmir	23 March 1984 (aged 26)	33	(Indonesia) Persija Jakarta
12	FW	Masrezwan Masturi	17 February 1981 (aged 29)	24	(Singapore) Geylang United
15	DF	Fahrudin Mustafić	17 April 1981 (aged 29)	54	(Indonesia) Persela Lamongan
16	DF	Daniel Bennett	7 January 1978 (aged 32)	100	(Singapore) Warriors
17	MF	Shahril Ishak (captain)	23 January 1984 (aged 26)	84	(Indonesia) Persib Bandung
18	GK	Lionel Lewis	16 December 1982 (aged 27)	70	(Singapore) Home United
19	MF	Khairul Amri	14 March 1985 (aged 25)	65	(Indonesia) Persiba Balikpapan
20	MF	Shahdan Sulaiman	9 May 1988 (aged 22)	1	(Singapore) Tampines Rovers
22	DF	Afiq Yunos	10 December 1990 (aged 19)	2	(Singapore) Young Lions
23	DF	Juma'at Jantan	23 February 1984 (aged 26)	15	(Singapore) Home United
26	DF	Rosman Sulaiman	6 November 1982 (aged 28)	1	(Singapore) Home United
28	DF	Safuwan Baharudin	22 September 1991 (aged 19)	3	(Singapore) Young Lions
30	GK	Izwan Mahbud	14 July 1990 (aged 20)	0	(Singapore) Young Lions

=== Myanmar ===
Head coach: Tin Myint Aung

No.	Pos.	Player	Date of birth (age)	Caps	Club
1	GK	Thiha Sithu	10 February 1987 (aged 23)		(Myanmar) Delta United
2	DF	Win Min Htut	6 April 1986 (aged 24)		(Myanmar) Kanbawza
3	DF	Zaw Linn Tun (captain)	23 July 1983 (aged 27)		(Myanmar) Zeyashwemye
4	DF	Moe Win	30 August 1988 (aged 22)		(Myanmar) Kanbawza
5	DF	Khin Maung Lwin	14 July 1980 (aged 30)		(Myanmar) Kanbawza
6	MF	Tun Tun Win	15 December 1987 (aged 22)		(Myanmar) Yadanarbon
7	DF	Khin Maung Tun	18 September 1985 (aged 25)		(Myanmar) Yadanarbon
8	MF	Aung Kyaw Moe	2 July 1982 (aged 28)		(Myanmar) Yadanarbon
9	FW	Yan Paing	27 November 1983 (aged 27)		(Myanmar) Yadanarbon
10	MF	Yazar Win Thein	9 April 1988 (aged 22)		(Myanmar) Zeyashwemye
11	FW	Kyaw Ko Ko	20 December 1992 (aged 17)		(Myanmar) Zeyashwemye
12	DF	Yan Aung Win	9 September 1992 (aged 18)		(Myanmar) Yangon United
13	DF	Kyaw Khing Win	23 December 1983 (aged 26)		(Myanmar) Yadanarbon
14	MF	Myo Min Tun	14 July 1986 (aged 24)		(Myanmar) Yangon United
16	DF	Nyar Na Lwin	2 July 1990 (aged 20)		(Myanmar) Kanbawza
17	DF	Aye San	24 December 1988 (aged 21)		(Myanmar) Kanbawza
18	GK	Kyaw Zin Htet	2 March 1987 (aged 23)		(Myanmar) Kanbawza
19	MF	Pai Soe	22 January 1987 (aged 23)		(Myanmar) Yadanarbon
22	GK	Nyi Nyi Lwin	11 August 1983 (aged 27)		(Myanmar) Zeyashwemye
23	MF	Kyaw Zayar Win	20 October 1988 (aged 22)		(Myanmar) Delta United
27	MF	Aung Myo Thant	1 December 1988 (aged 22)		(Myanmar) Kanbawza
28	FW	Mai Aih Naing	8 October 1990 (aged 20)		(Myanmar) Okktha United

=== Philippines ===
Head coach: (Scotland) Simon McMenemy

No.	Pos.	Player	Date of birth (age)	Caps	Club
1	GK	Neil Etheridge	7 February 1990 (aged 20)		(England) Fulham
2	DF	Rob Gier	6 January 1980 (aged 30)		(England) Ascot United
4	DF	Anton del Rosario	23 December 1981 (aged 28)		(Philippines) Kaya
6	MF	Roel Gener	27 June 1974 (aged 36)		(Philippines) Philippine Army
7	FW	James Younghusband	4 September 1986 (aged 24)		(England) Farnborough
9	FW	Yanti Barsales	6 February 1973 (aged 37)		(Philippines) Philippine Air Force
10	FW	Phil Younghusband	4 August 1987 (aged 23)		(Philippines) San Beda
11	DF	Aly Borromeo (captain)	28 June 1983 (aged 27)		(Philippines) Kaya
13	FW	Emelio Caligdong	8 September 1982 (aged 28)		(Philippines) Philippine Air Force
14	MF	Mark Ferrer	12 February 1989 (aged 21)		(Philippines) Philippine Air Force
15	MF	Rey Palmes	27 December 1979 (aged 30)		(Philippines) Philippine Air Force
17	MF	Jason de Jong	28 February 1990 (aged 20)		(Netherlands) Veendam
18	MF	Chris Greatwich	30 September 1983 (aged 27)		(United States) Morris County Colonials
19	MF	Nestorio Margarse	3 May 1976 (aged 34)		(Philippines) Philippine Army
21	FW	Peter Jaugan	2 July 1983 (aged 27)		(Philippines) Philippine Air Force
22	GK	Eduard Sacapaño	14 February 1980 (aged 30)		(Philippines) Philippine Army
23	FW	Ian Araneta	2 March 1982 (aged 28)		(Philippines) Philippine Air Force
25	DF	Joebel Bermejo	28 February 1981 (aged 29)		(Philippines) Philippine Air Force
26	DF	David Basa	2 April 1989 (aged 21)		(Philippines) University of Santo Tomas
27	DF	Ray Jónsson	2 March 1979 (aged 31)		(Iceland) Grindavík
28	DF	Kristopher Relucio	22 April 1978 (aged 32)		(Philippines) Laos
30	DF	Mark Drinkuth	12 June 1991 (aged 19)		(Germany) Agon Düsseldorf
