= 2012 VFF Cup squads =

Below are the squads for the 2012 VFF Cup, hosted by Vietnam.

== Vietnam ==
Coach: Phan Thanh Hùng

No.	Pos.	Player	Date of birth (age)	Caps	Club
1	GK	Nguyễn Thanh Bình	20 October 1991 (aged 21)	2	(Vietnam) SHB Đà Nẵng
4	DF	Châu Lê Phước Vĩnh	19 August 1985 (aged 27)	3	(Vietnam) SHB Đà Nẵng
5	DF	Nguyễn Văn Biển	27 April 1985 (aged 27)	12	(Vietnam) Hà Nội T&T
6	DF	Trần Đình Đồng	20 May 1987 (aged 25)	9	(Vietnam) Sông Lam Nghệ An
10	MF	Nguyễn Văn Quyết	27 June 1991 (aged 21)	7	(Vietnam) Hà Nội T&T
11	MF	Nguyễn Trọng Hoàng	14 April 1989 (aged 23)	21	(Vietnam) Sông Lam Nghệ An
12	MF	Phan Thanh Hưng	14 January 1987 (aged 25)	4	(Vietnam) SHB Đà Nẵng
13	FW	Nguyễn Quang Hải	1 November 1985 (aged 26)	31	(Vietnam) Navibank Sài Gòn
14	MF	Lê Tấn Tài	4 January 1984 (aged 28)	48	(Vietnam) Khatoco Khánh Hòa
15	DF	Trương Đình Luật	12 November 1983 (aged 28)	4	(Vietnam) Sài Gòn Xuân Thành
17	MF	Nguyễn Vũ Phong	6 February 1985 (aged 27)	40	(Vietnam) Becamex Bình Dương
18	MF	Huỳnh Quốc Anh	13 January 1985 (aged 27)	4	(Vietnam) SHB Đà Nẵng
19	MF	Phạm Thành Lương	10 September 1988 (aged 24)	35	(Vietnam) Hà Nội
20	MF	Cao Sỹ Cường	26 April 1984 (aged 28)	4	(Vietnam) Hà Nội T&T
21	MF	Nguyễn Ngọc Duy	4 July 1986 (aged 26)	8	(Vietnam) Hà Nội T&T
22	DF	Âu Văn Hoàn	1 October 1989 (aged 23)	0	(Vietnam) Sông Lam Nghệ An
24	GK	Dương Hồng Sơn (c)	20 November 1982 (aged 29)	27	(Vietnam) Hà Nội T&T
25	GK	Bùi Tấn Trường	19 February 1986 (aged 26)	3	(Vietnam) Sài Gòn Xuân Thành
26	DF	Nguyễn Gia Từ	17 December 1989 (aged 22)	2	(Vietnam) The Vissai Ninh Bình
27	DF	Đào Văn Phong	June 6, 1985 (aged 27)	8	(Vietnam) Khatoco Khánh Hòa
28	MF	Phạm Nguyên Sa	15 December 1988 (aged 23)	2	(Vietnam) SHB Đà Nẵng
30	DF	Nguyễn Hồng Tiến	6 July 1985 (aged 27)	2	(Vietnam) Hà nội T&T

== South Korea University Selection ==
Coach: Ha Sung-Joon

No.	Pos.	Player	Date of birth (age)	Caps	Club
1	GK	Choi Dae-Myoung	6 January 1992 (aged 20)		(South Korea) Pukyong National University F.C.
2	DF	Kim Bong-Rae (c)	2 July 1990 (aged 22)		(South Korea) Myeongji University F.C.
3	DF	Park Jung-Ang	6 June 1991 (aged 21)		(South Korea) Sangji University F.C.
4	DF	Kim Ji-Yong	7 April 1990 (aged 22)		(South Korea) Chungbuk National University F.C.
5	DF	Park Hee-Sung	22 March 1990 (aged 22)		(South Korea) Wonkwang University F.C.
6	DF	Bae Sung-Geun	26 May 1991 (aged 21)		(South Korea) Kyonggi University F.C.
7	MF	Lee Jung-Kwon	1 January 1992 (aged 20)		(South Korea) Myeongji University F.C.
8	MF	Kim Pyeong-Jin	11 August 1990 (aged 22)		(South Korea) Hannam University F.C.
9	FW	Gong Minh-Yun	19 January 1990 (aged 22)		(South Korea) Cheongju University F.C.
10	FW	Han Seung-Yeop	4 November 1990 (aged 21)		(South Korea) Kyonggi University F.C.
11	MF	Cho Inh-Yeong	1 February 1990 (aged 22)		(South Korea) University of Incheon F.C.
12	DF	Han Hee-Hun	10 August 1990 (aged 22)		(South Korea) Sangji University F.C.
13	FW	Park Jung-Bin	26 September 1990 (aged 22)		(South Korea) GukJe Cyber University F.C.
14	MF	Kang Shin-Kyu	6 November 1988 (aged 23)		(South Korea) Cheongju University F.C.
15	MF	Yang Se-Un	23 December 1990 (aged 21)		(South Korea) Nambu University F.C.
16	MF	Kim Kyu-Nam	26 November 1992 (aged 19)		(South Korea) Kunjang University F.C.
17	MF	Park Ji-Hoon	5 June 1990 (aged 22)		(South Korea) Cheongju University F.C.
18	GK	Hwang Sung-Min	23 June 1991 (aged 21)		(South Korea) Hannam University F.C.
19	DF	Lee Seung-Hyun	27 October 1989 (aged 22)		(South Korea) Hanmin College F.C.
20	DF	Choi Young-Kwang	20 May 1990 (aged 22)		(South Korea) Hannam University F.C.

== Turkmenistan ==
Coach: Ýazguly Hojageldyýew

No.	Pos.	Player	Date of birth (age)	Caps	Club
1	GK	Rahmanberdi Alyhanow	14 February 1984 (aged 26)		(Turkmenistan) HTTU Aşgabat
2	DF	Rasim Gereyhanow			(Turkmenistan)
3	DF	Şöhrat Söýünow	8 March 1992 (aged 20)		(Turkmenistan) HTTU Aşgabat
6	MF	Gurbangeldi Batyrow			(Turkmenistan) HTTU Aşgabat
7	MF	Umidjan Astanow	11 August 1990 (aged 22)		(Turkmenistan) Merw Mary
8	FW	Bagtyýar Hojaahmedow	14 February 1985 (aged 27)		(Turkmenistan) Merw Mary
9	FW	Süleyman Muhadow			(Turkmenistan) HTTU Aşgabat
10	FW	Aleksandr Boliýan	22 March 1994 (aged 18)		(Greece) Skoda Xanthi
12	DF	Serdar Annaorazow	29 June 1990 (aged 22)		(Turkmenistan) HTTU Aşgabat
16	GK	Nikita Gorbunow	14 February 1984 (aged 28)		(Turkmenistan) Balkan
17	MF	Guwanç Abylow	30 March 1988 (aged 24)		(Turkmenistan) HTTU Aşgabat
18	FW	Furkat Tursunow			(Turkmenistan) Lebap
19	DF	Ahmet Ataýew	19 September 1990 (aged 22)		(Turkmenistan) HTTU Aşgabat
20	MF	Amir Gurbani	24 October 1987 (aged 25)		(Turkmenistan) Balkan
21	FW	Wladimir Baýramow	2 August 1980 (aged 32)		(Kazakhstan) Tobol
23	DF	Dawid Sarkisow (c)	20 November 1982 (aged 29)		(Turkmenistan) HTTU Aşgabat
30	DF	Akmyrat Jumanazarow	5 November 1987 (aged 24)		(Turkmenistan) Merw Mary
33	MF	Annasahat Annasahatow			(Turkmenistan)

== Laos ==
Coach: (Japan) Kokichi Kimura

No.	Pos.	Player	Date of birth (age)	Caps	Club
1	GK	Sengphachan Bounthisanh	1 June 1987 (aged 23)		(Laos) Vientiane
2	DF	Saynakhonevieng Phommapanya	28 October 1988 (aged 21)		(Laos) Yotha
3	DF	Khamla Pinkeo	23 November 1990 (aged 19)		(Laos) Lao Police Club
4	DF	Ketsada Souksavanh	23 November 1992 (aged 17)		(Thailand) Nong Khai
5	DF	Khamphoumy Hanvilay	2 December 1990 (aged 19)		(Laos) Vientiane
6	MF	Sibounhuang Thotnilath	5 November 1990 (aged 19)		(Laos)
7	MF	Viengsavanh Sayyaboun	3 June 1989 (aged 21)		(Laos)
8	MF	Vilayout Sayyabounsou	27 November 1992 (age 33)		(Laos) Ezra FC
9	FW	Visay Phaphouvanin (c)	12 June 1985 (aged 25)		(Laos) Vientiane FC
10	MF	Keoviengphet Liththideth	30 November 1992 (aged 17)		(Laos) Ezra FC
12	MF	Phatthana Syvilay	4 October 1990 (aged 20)		(Laos) Yotha FC
14	FW	Sopha Saysana	9 December 1992 (aged 17)		(Thailand) Nong Khai F.C.
15	FW	Sihavong Khonesavanh	10 October 1994 (aged 16)		(Laos)
17	MF	Phonepaseuth Sysoutham	28 May 1990 (aged 20)		(Laos)
18	GK	Soukthavy Soundala	4 November 1995 (aged 14)		(Laos) Ezra
19	DF	Kovanh Namthavixay	23 July 1987 (aged 23)		(Laos) Lao Army
20	MF	Daoneua Siviengxay	10 December 1991 (aged 18)		(Laos) Vientiane FC
21	DF	Chanthala Phetthavanh	2 August 1992 (aged 18)		(Laos) Ezra
22	MF	Sompong Manivanh	29 October 1990 (aged 19)		(Laos)
23	DF	Odien Syharlad	14 May 1992 (aged 18)		(Laos)
