= 2012 AFF Championship squads =

Association football competition squads

Below are the squads for the 2012 AFF Championship, co-hosted by Malaysia and Thailand, which took place between 24 November and 22 December 2012. The player's total caps, their club teams and age are as of 24 November 2012, the tournament's opening day.

== Group A ==
=== Thailand ===
Head coach: (Germany) Winfried Schäfer

No.	Pos.	Player	Date of birth (age)	Caps	Club
1	GK	Kawin Thamsatchanan	26 January 1990 (aged 22)		(Thailand) Muangthong United
2	DF	Panupong Wongsa (captain)	23 November 1983 (aged 29)		(Thailand) Muangthong United
3	DF	Theeraton Bunmathan	6 February 1990 (aged 22)		(Thailand) Buriram United
4	DF	Chonlatit Jantakam	2 June 1985 (aged 27)		(Thailand) Chonburi
5	DF	Niweat Siriwong	18 July 1977 (aged 35)		(Thailand) Pattaya United
6	DF	Nataporn Phanrit	11 January 1982 (aged 30)		(Thailand) BEC Tero Sasana
7	MF	Datsakorn Thonglao	30 December 1983 (aged 28)		(Thailand) Muangthong United
8	MF	Sumanya Purisai	5 December 1986 (aged 25)		(Thailand) Chainat
9	FW	Kirati Keawsombut	12 January 1987 (aged 25)		(Thailand) Wuachon United
10	FW	Teerasil Dangda	6 June 1988 (aged 24)		(Thailand) Muangthong United
11	DF	Anucha Kitpongsri	23 May 1983 (aged 29)		(Thailand) Chonburi
12	MF	Adul Lahsoh	19 September 1986 (aged 26)		(Thailand) Chonburi
13	DF	Prayad Boonya	15 November 1979 (aged 33)		(Thailand) Ratchaburi
14	FW	Sompong Soleb	30 July 1986 (aged 26)		(Thailand) Bangkok United
15	MF	Arthit Sunthornpit	19 April 1986 (aged 26)		(Thailand) Chonburi
16	MF	Jakkapan Pornsai	28 March 1987 (aged 25)		(Thailand) Muangthong United
17	MF	Apipoo Suntornpanavej	18 July 1986 (aged 26)		(Thailand) Osotspa Saraburi
18	GK	Sinthaweechai Hathairattanakool	23 March 1982 (aged 30)		(Thailand) Chonburi
19	MF	Pichitphong Choeichiu	28 August 1982 (aged 30)		(Thailand) Muangthong United
20	FW	Pipob On-Mo	22 April 1979 (aged 33)		(Thailand) Chonburi
21	DF	Piyapol Bantao	8 November 1987 (aged 25)		(Thailand) Muangthong United
22	MF	Chanathip Songkrasin	5 October 1993 (aged 19)		(Thailand) BEC Tero Sasana

=== Vietnam ===
Head coach: Phan Thanh Hùng

No.	Pos.	Player	Date of birth (age)	Caps	Club
3	DF	Nguyễn Minh Đức (captain)	14 September 1983 (aged 29)	22	(Vietnam) Sài Gòn Xuân Thành
5	DF	Nguyễn Văn Biển	27 April 1985 (aged 27)	13	(Vietnam) Hà Nội T&T
6	DF	Trần Đình Đồng	20 May 1987 (aged 25)	12	(Vietnam) Sông Lam Nghệ An
9	FW	Lê Công Vinh	10 December 1985 (aged 26)	53	(Vietnam) Hà Nội
10	MF	Nguyễn Văn Quyết	27 June 1991 (aged 21)	10	(Vietnam) Hà Nội T&T
11	MF	Nguyễn Trọng Hoàng	14 April 1989 (aged 23)	25	(Vietnam) Sông Lam Nghệ An
12	MF	Phan Thanh Hưng	14 January 1987 (aged 25)	7	(Vietnam) SHB Đà Nẵng
13	FW	Nguyễn Quang Hải	1 November 1985 (aged 27)	33	(Vietnam) Khatoco Khánh Hòa
14	MF	Lê Tấn Tài	4 January 1984 (aged 28)	49	(Vietnam) Khatoco Khánh Hòa
17	MF	Nguyễn Vũ Phong	6 February 1985 (aged 27)	43	(Vietnam) Becamex Bình Dương
18	DF	Trương Đình Luật	12 November 1983 (aged 29)	6	(Vietnam) Sài Gòn Xuân Thành
19	MF	Phạm Thành Lương	10 September 1988 (aged 24)	39	(Vietnam) Hà Nội
20	MF	Cao Sỹ Cường	26 April 1984 (aged 28)	8	(Vietnam) Hà Nội T&T
21	MF	Nguyễn Ngọc Duy	4 July 1986 (aged 26)	10	(Vietnam) Hà Nội T&T
22	DF	Âu Văn Hoàn	1 October 1989 (aged 23)	2	(Vietnam) Sông Lam Nghệ An
24	GK	Dương Hồng Sơn	20 November 1982 (aged 30)	36	(Vietnam) Hà Nội T&T
25	GK	Bùi Tấn Trường	19 February 1986 (aged 26)	4	(Vietnam) Sài Gòn Xuân Thành
26	DF	Nguyễn Gia Từ	17 December 1989 (aged 22)	5	(Vietnam) The Vissai Ninh Bình
27	DF	Đào Văn Phong	6 June 1985 (aged 27)	10	(Vietnam) Khatoco Khánh Hòa
28	MF	Phạm Nguyên Sa	15 December 1988 (aged 23)	6	(Vietnam) SHB Đà Nẵng
30	DF	Nguyễn Hồng Tiến	6 July 1985 (aged 27)	3	(Vietnam) Hà Nội T&T
32	FW	Huỳnh Quốc Anh	13 January 1985 (aged 27)	8	(Vietnam) SHB Đà Nẵng

=== Philippines ===
Head coach: (Germany) Michael Weiß

No.	Pos.	Player	Date of birth (age)	Caps	Club
2	DF	Rob Gier (captain)	6 January 1981 (aged 31)		(England) Ascot United
3	DF	Jason Sabio	30 June 1986 (aged 26)		(Philippines) Kaya
5	DF	Juan Luis Guirado	27 August 1979 (aged 33)		(Spain) Racing Lermeño
7	MF	James Younghusband	4 September 1986 (aged 26)		(Philippines) Loyola
8	DF	Dennis Cagara	19 February 1985 (aged 27)		(Germany) Karlsruher SC
10	FW	Phil Younghusband	4 August 1987 (aged 25)		(Philippines) Loyola
11	GK	Eduard Sacapaño	14 February 1980 (aged 32)		(Philippines) Philippine Army
12	FW	Ángel Guirado	9 December 1984 (aged 27)		(India) Salgaocar
13	MF	Emelio Caligdong	28 September 1982 (aged 30)		(Philippines) Philippine Air Force
14	DF	Carli de Murga	30 November 1988 (aged 23)		(Philippines) Global
18	MF	Chris Greatwich	30 September 1983 (aged 29)		(United States) Morris County Colonials
19	MF	Jerry Lucena	11 August 1980 (aged 32)		(Denmark) Esbjerg
20	FW	Denis Wolf	15 January 1983 (aged 29)		(Philippines) Global
21	MF	Jason de Jong	28 February 1990 (aged 22)		(Philippines) Stallion
22	MF	Paul Mulders	16 January 1981 (aged 31)		(Netherlands) ADO Den Haag
24	MF	Marwin Angeles	9 January 1991 (aged 21)		(Philippines) Global
27	DF	Ray Jónsson	3 February 1979 (aged 33)		(Iceland) Grindavik
28	MF	Jeffrey Christiaens	17 May 1991 (aged 21)		(Philippines) Global
29	MF	Patrick Reichelt	15 June 1988 (aged 24)		(Philippines) Global
32	GK	Ref Cuaresma	31 October 1982 (aged 30)		(Philippines) Loyola
34	MF	Demitrius Omphroy	30 May 1989 (aged 23)		(Philippines) Global
35	GK	Roland Müller	2 March 1988 (aged 24)		(Germany) MSV Duisburg

=== Myanmar ===
Head coach: (South Korea) Park Sung-Hwa

No.	Pos.	Player	Date of birth (age)	Caps	Club
1	GK	Thiha Sithu	10 March 1987 (aged 25)	14	(Myanmar) Ayeyawady United
3	DF	Zaw Min Tun	20 May 1992 (aged 20)	15	(Myanmar) Magway
5	DF	Thein Than Win	25 November 1991 (aged 20)	5	(Myanmar) Kanbawza
6	MF	Yan Aung Kyaw	4 August 1989 (aged 23)	12	(Myanmar) Yangon United
7	DF	Khin Maung Lwin (captain)	27 December 1988 (aged 23)	49	(Myanmar) Yangon United
8	MF	Kyi Lin	4 September 1992 (aged 20)	12	(Myanmar) Yangon United
10	FW	Yan Paing	27 November 1983 (aged 28)	58	(Myanmar) Yadanarbon
13	DF	Pyae Phyo Aung	19 September 1987 (aged 25)	5	(Myanmar) Yangon United
14	DF	David Htan	13 May 1990 (aged 22)	11	(Myanmar) Yangon United
15	DF	Aung Zaw	5 March 1990 (aged 22)	0	(Myanmar) Hantharwady United
16	FW	Thet Naing	20 December 1992 (aged 19)	5	(Myanmar) Yadanarbon
17	MF	Phyo Ko Ko Thein	24 January 1993 (aged 19)	1	(Myanmar) Ayeyawady United
18	GK	Kyaw Zin Phyo	1 February 1994 (aged 18)	0	(Myanmar) Magway
19	MF	Naing Lin Oo	15 June 1993 (aged 19)	4	(Myanmar) Ayeyawady United
24	MF	Mai Aih Naing	18 October 1990 (aged 22)	7	(Myanmar) Kanbawza
26	DF	Aung Hein Kyaw	19 July 1991 (aged 21)	7	(Myanmar) Zeyar Shwe Myay
27	DF	Zaw Zaw Oo	19 July 1991 (aged 21)	6	(Myanmar) Ayeyawady United
28	MF	Aung Moe	9 June 1988 (aged 24)	2	(Myanmar) Hantharwady United
29	DF	Han Win Aung	17 December 1986 (aged 25)	14	(Myanmar) Kanbawza
30	FW	Kaung Sithu	22 January 1993 (aged 19)	7	(Myanmar) Yangon United
33	FW	Soe Kyaw Kyaw	16 February 1990 (aged 22)	1	(Myanmar) Yadanarbon
34	DF	Moe Win	30 March 1988 (aged 24)	36	(Myanmar) Naypyidaw

== Group B ==
=== Malaysia ===
Head coach: Datuk K. Rajagopal

No.	Pos.	Player	Date of birth (age)	Caps	Club
1	GK	Farizal Marlias	29 June 1986 (aged 26)	19	(Malaysia) Perak
2	FW	Mahali Jasuli	2 April 1989 (aged 23)	23	(Malaysia) Selangor
3	DF	Faizal Muhamad	3 March 1989 (aged 23)	7	(Malaysia) Terengganu
5	DF	Bunyamin Umar	7 January 1988 (aged 24)	19	(Malaysia) Selangor
6	DF	Zubir Azmi	14 November 1991 (aged 21)	5	(Malaysia) Terengganu
7	DF	Aidil Zafuan	3 August 1987 (aged 25)	45	(Malaysia) Darul Takzim
8	MF	Safiq Rahim (captain)	5 July 1987 (aged 25)	35	(Malaysia) Darul Takzim
9	FW	Norshahrul Idlan	8 June 1986 (aged 26)	29	(Malaysia) Darul Takzim
10	FW	Safee Sali	28 January 1984 (aged 28)	46	(Malaysia) Darul Takzim
11	DF	Azmi Muslim	17 October 1986 (aged 26)	17	(Malaysia) Darul Takzim
12	MF	Amar Rohidan	23 April 1987 (aged 25)	28	(Malaysia) Kedah
13	FW	Ahmad Fakri Saarani	8 July 1989 (aged 23)	18	(Portugal) Atlético S.C.
14	FW	Khyril Muhymeen	9 May 1987 (aged 25)	25	(Malaysia) Kedah
15	MF	Gary Steven Robbat	3 September 1992 (aged 20)	4	(Malaysia) Harimau Muda A
16	DF	S. Kunanlan	15 September 1986 (aged 26)	36	(Malaysia) Selangor
17	FW	Azamuddin Akil	16 April 1985 (aged 27)	9	(Malaysia) Pahang
18	MF	Shakir Shaari	29 September 1986 (aged 26)	7	(Malaysia) Kelantan
19	FW	Hazwan Bakri	19 June 1991 (aged 21)	2	(Malaysia) Harimau Muda A
22	GK	Khairul Fahmi Che Mat	7 January 1989 (aged 23)	15	(Malaysia) Kelantan
23	MF	Baddrol Bakhtiar	1 February 1988 (aged 24)	17	(Malaysia) Kedah
25	FW	Wan Zack Haikal	28 January 1991 (aged 21)	6	(Malaysia) Harimau Muda A
27	DF	Fadhli Shas	21 January 1991 (aged 21)	22	(Malaysia) Darul Takzim

=== Indonesia ===
Head coach: Nilmaizar

No.	Pos.	Player	Date of birth (age)	Caps	Club
1	GK	Syamsidar	15 July 1982 (aged 30)	4	(Indonesia) Semen Padang
2	DF	Handi Ramdhan	24 June 1983 (aged 29)	5	(Indonesia) Persija IPL
3	MF	Raphael Maitimo	17 March 1984 (aged 28)	0	(Netherlands) VV Capelle
4	DF	Novan Sasongko	26 November 1989 (aged 22)	5	(Indonesia) Semen Padang
5	DF	Nopendi	15 November 1986 (aged 26)	3	(Indonesia) Persiba Bantul
6	DF	Fachrudin Aryanto	19 February 1989 (aged 23)	2	(Indonesia) PSS Sleman
7	MF	Muhammad Taufiq	29 November 1986 (aged 25)	5	(Indonesia) Persebaya 1927
8	FW	Elie Aiboy (captain)	20 April 1979 (aged 33)	46	(Indonesia) Semen Padang
9	FW	Samsul Arif	14 January 1985 (aged 27)	6	(Indonesia) Persela Lamongan
10	FW	Irfan Bachdim	11 August 1988 (aged 24)	18	(Thailand) Chonburi
12	GK	Wahyu Tri Nugroho	27 July 1986 (aged 26)	0	(Indonesia) Persiba Bantul
13	DF	Wahyu Wijiastanto	31 May 1986 (aged 26)	7	(Indonesia) Semen Padang
14	MF	Rasyid Bakri	17 January 1991 (aged 21)	2	(Indonesia) PSM Makassar
18	DF	Valentino Telaubun	21 November 1984 (aged 28)	2	(Indonesia) Bontang
20	FW	Bambang Pamungkas	10 June 1980 (aged 32)	83	(Indonesia) Persija Jakarta
21	FW	Andik Vermansyah	23 November 1991 (aged 21)	1	(Indonesia) Persebaya 1927
22	GK	Endra Prasetya	1 May 1981 (aged 31)	3	(Indonesia) Persebaya 1927
25	FW	Cornelius Geddy	25 June 1986 (aged 26)	1	(Indonesia) Persija IPL
26	MF	Vendry Mofu	10 September 1989 (aged 23)	4	(Indonesia) Semen Padang
28	FW	Oktovianus Maniani	27 October 1990 (aged 22)	19	(Indonesia) Persiram Raja Ampat
29	FW	Muhammad Rahmat	28 May 1988 (aged 24)	2	(Indonesia) PSM Makassar
33	MF	Tonnie Cusell	4 February 1983 (aged 29)	0	(Netherlands) GVVV
34	FW	Jhon van Beukering	11 September 1983 (aged 29)	0	(Netherlands) Presikhaaf

=== Singapore ===
Head coach: (Serbia) Radojko Avramović

No.	Pos.	Player	Date of birth (age)	Caps	Club
1	GK	Izwan Mahbud	14 July 1990 (aged 22)		(Malaysia) LionsXII
3	DF	Shaiful Esah	26 May 1986 (aged 26)		(Malaysia) LionsXII
4	MF	Isa Halim	15 May 1986 (aged 26)		(Malaysia) LionsXII
5	DF	Baihakki Khaizan	31 January 1984 (aged 28)		(Malaysia) LionsXII
7	MF	Shi Jiayi	2 September 1983 (aged 29)		(Singapore) Home United
8	MF	Shahdan Sulaiman	9 May 1988 (aged 24)		(Malaysia) LionsXII
9	FW	Aleksandar Đurić	12 August 1970 (aged 42)		(Singapore) Tampines Rovers
10	FW	Fazrul Nawaz	17 April 1985 (aged 27)		Singapore Armed Forces
11	FW	Qiu Li	6 June 1981 (aged 31)		(Singapore) Home United
13	MF	Fazli Ayob	24 January 1990 (aged 22)		(Singapore) Young Lions
14	MF	Hariss Harun	19 November 1990 (aged 22)		(Malaysia) LionsXII
15	DF	Mustafic Fahrudin	17 April 1981 (aged 31)		(Singapore) Tampines Rovers
16	DF	Daniel Bennett	7 January 1978 (aged 34)		Singapore Armed Forces
17	FW	Shahril Ishak (captain)	23 January 1984 (aged 28)		(Malaysia) LionsXII
18	GK	Hyrulnizam Juma'at	14 November 1986 (aged 26)		(Malaysia) LionsXII
19	FW	Khairul Amri	15 March 1985 (aged 27)		(Malaysia) LionsXII
20	MF	Irwan Shah	2 November 1988 (aged 24)		(Malaysia) LionsXII
21	DF	Safuwan Baharudin	22 September 1991 (aged 21)		(Malaysia) LionsXII
24	MF	Firdaus Kasman	24 January 1988 (aged 24)		(Malaysia) LionsXII
29	FW	Hafiz Rahim	19 November 1983 (aged 29)		(Singapore) Gombak United
30	GK	Joey Sim	2 March 1987 (aged 25)		(Singapore) Balestier Khalsa
34	MF	Zulfahmi Arifin	5 October 1991 (aged 21)		(Singapore) Young Lions

=== Laos ===
Head coach: (Japan) Kokichi Kimura

No.	Pos.	Player	Date of birth (age)	Caps	Club
1	GK	Sengphachan Bounthisanh	1 June 1987 (aged 25)		(Laos) Vientiane
2	DF	Saynakhonevieng Phommapanya	28 October 1988 (aged 24)		(Laos) Yotha
3	DF	Khamla Pinkeo	23 November 1990 (aged 22)		(Laos) Lao Police
4	DF	Ketsada Souksavanh	23 November 1992 (aged 20)		(Thailand) Nong Khai
5	DF	Khamphoumy Hanvilay	2 December 1990 (aged 21)		(Laos) Vientiane
6	FW	Souksamay Manhmanyvong	20 September 1986 (aged 26)		(Laos) Vientiane
7	MF	Soukaphone Vongchiengkham	9 March 1992 (aged 20)		(Thailand) Krabi
8	FW	Keoviengphet Liththideth	30 November 1992 (aged 19)		(Laos) Ezra
9	FW	Visay Phaphouvanin (captain)	12 June 1985 (aged 27)		(Laos) Vientiane
10	MF	Kanlaya Sysomvang	3 November 1990 (aged 22)		(Thailand) Khonkaen
11	MF	Khonesavanh Sihavong	10 October 1994 (aged 18)		(Laos) Lao Police
12	DF	Phatthana Syvilay	4 October 1990 (aged 22)		(Laos) Yotha
13	MF	Vilayuth Sayyabounsou	27 November 1992 (aged 19)		(Laos) Ezra
14	MF	Sopha Saysana	9 December 1992 (aged 19)		(Thailand) Nong Khai
15	MF	Viengsavanh Sayyaboun	3 June 1989 (aged 23)		(Laos) Lao Army
16	MF	Daoneua Siviengxay	10 December 1991 (aged 20)		(Laos) Vientiane
17	MF	Phonepaseuth Sysoutham	28 May 1990 (aged 22)		(Laos) Vientiane
18	GK	Soukthavy Soundala	4 November 1995 (aged 17)		(Laos) Ezra
19	DF	Kovanh Namthavixay	23 July 1987 (aged 25)		(Laos) Lao Army
20	FW	Khampheng Sayavutthi	19 July 1986 (aged 26)		(Thailand) Khonkaen
21	DF	Odien Syharlad	14 May 1992 (aged 20)		(Laos) Yotha
22	GK	Seng-athit Somvang	2 June 1991 (aged 21)		(Laos) Lao Police

== Statistics ==
=== Player representation by league system ===
Country	Players	Outside national squad
Thailand	28	6
Myanmar	22	0
Singapore	22	0
Vietnam	22	0
Malaysia	21	0
Laos	17	0
Indonesia	16	0
Philippines	13	0
