= 2014 AFF Championship squads =

Association football competition squads

Below are the squads for the 2014 AFF Championship, co-hosted by Singapore and Vietnam, which took place between 22 November and 20 December 2014.

Each team was allowed to register 22 official players (at least two goalkeepers) and one more reserve player.

== Group A ==
=== Vietnam ===
Head coach: (Japan) Toshiya Miura

No.	Pos.	Player	Date of birth (age)	Club
1	GK	Nguyễn Thanh Bình	11 August 1987 (aged 27)	(Vietnam Football Federation) SHB Đà Nẵng
3	DF	Lê Phước Tứ	15 April 1984 (aged 30)	(Vietnam Football Federation) Becamex Bình Dương
4	DF	Đinh Tiến Thành	24 January 1991 (aged 23)	(Vietnam Football Federation) Hải Phòng
5	DF	Nguyễn Văn Biển	27 April 1985 (aged 29)	(Vietnam Football Federation) Hà Nội T&T
7	MF	Ngô Hoàng Thịnh	21 April 1992 (aged 22)	(Vietnam Football Federation) Sông Lam Nghệ An
9	FW	Lê Công Vinh	10 December 1985 (aged 28)	(Vietnam Football Federation) Becamex Bình Dương
10	FW	Nguyễn Văn Quyết	1 July 1991 (aged 23)	(Vietnam Football Federation) Hà Nội T&T
11	FW	Nguyễn Anh Đức	25 January 1985 (aged 29)	(Vietnam Football Federation) Becamex Bình Dương
14	MF	Lê Tấn Tài (captain)	26 March 1984 (aged 30)	(Vietnam Football Federation) Becamex Bình Dương
15	DF	Quế Ngọc Hải	15 May 1993 (aged 21)	(Vietnam Football Federation) Sông Lam Nghệ An
16	DF	Nguyễn Huy Cường	8 November 1986 (aged 28)	(Vietnam Football Federation) Than Quảng Ninh
19	MF	Phạm Thành Lương	10 September 1988 (aged 26)	(Vietnam Football Federation) Hà Nội T&T
20	MF	Đinh Thanh Trung	24 January 1988 (aged 26)	(Vietnam Football Federation) QNK Quảng Nam
21	MF	Vũ Minh Tuấn	19 September 1990 (aged 24)	(Vietnam Football Federation) Than Quảng Ninh
23	GK	Trần Nguyên Mạnh	20 December 1991 (aged 22)	(Vietnam Football Federation) Sông Lam Nghệ An
24	FW	Nguyễn Hải Anh	15 September 1987 (aged 27)	(Vietnam Football Federation) Đồng Nai
25	MF	Võ Huy Toàn	15 March 1993 (aged 21)	(Vietnam Football Federation) SHB Đà Nẵng
27	MF	Mạc Hồng Quân	1 January 1992 (aged 22)	(Vietnam Football Federation) Thanh Hóa
29	MF	Nguyễn Huy Hùng	22 June 1992 (aged 22)	(Vietnam Football Federation) Trẻ Hà Nội T&T
31	DF	Nguyễn Thanh Hiền	16 April 1993 (aged 21)	(Vietnam Football Federation) TĐCS Đồng Tháp
33	DF	Nguyễn Minh Tùng	9 August 1992 (aged 22)	(Vietnam Football Federation) Hùng Vương An Giang
35	DF	Nguyễn Xuân Thành	22 March 1985 (aged 29)	(Vietnam Football Federation) Thanh Hóa

=== Philippines ===
Head coach: (United States) Thomas Dooley

No.	Pos.	Player	Date of birth (age)	Club
2	DF	Rob Gier (captain)	6 January 1981 (aged 33)	(The Football Association) Ascot United
5	DF	Juan Luis Guirado	27 August 1979 (aged 35)	(Philippine Football Federation) Ceres
7	MF	James Younghusband	4 September 1986 (aged 28)	(Philippine Football Federation) Loyola Meralco Sparks
8	MF	Manuel Ott	6 May 1992 (aged 22)	(Philippine Football Federation) Ceres
9	MF	Misagh Bahadoran	10 January 1987 (aged 27)	(Philippine Football Federation) Global
10	FW	Phil Younghusband	4 August 1987 (aged 27)	(Philippine Football Federation) Loyola Meralco Sparks
11	DF	Daisuke Sato	20 September 1994 (aged 20)	(Philippine Football Federation) Global
12	DF	Amani Aguinaldo	24 April 1995 (aged 19)	(Philippine Football Federation) Global
16	GK	Patrick Deyto	15 February 1990 (aged 24)	(Philippine Football Federation) Global
18	MF	Chris Greatwich	30 September 1983 (aged 31)	(Philippine Football Federation) Kaya
19	MF	Jerry Lucena	11 August 1980 (aged 34)	(Danish Football Association) Esbjerg
21	MF	Martin Steuble	9 June 1988 (aged 26)	(United States Soccer Federation) Sporting Kansas City
22	MF	Paul Mulders	16 January 1981 (aged 33)	(Philippine Football Federation) Ceres
23	DF	Simone Rota	6 November 1984 (aged 30)	(Philippine Football Federation) Stallion
24	MF	Simon Greatwich	30 September 1988 (aged 26)	(Philippine Football Federation) Loyola Meralco Sparks
25	FW	Mark Hartmann	20 January 1992 (aged 22)	(Philippine Football Federation) Global
26	GK	Tomas Trigo	8 June 1989 (aged 25)	(Philippine Football Federation) Team Socceroo
27	MF	Curt Dizon	4 February 1994 (aged 20)	(Philippine Football Federation) Global
29	FW	Patrick Reichelt	15 June 1988 (aged 26)	(Philippine Football Federation) Ceres
34	DF	Kenshiro Daniels	13 January 1995 (aged 19)	(Philippine Football Federation) Kaya
35	MF	Dennis Villanueva	28 April 1992 (aged 22)	(Philippine Football Federation) Global

=== Indonesia ===
Head coach: (Austria) Alfred Riedl

No.	Pos.	Player	Date of birth (age)	Club
1	GK	Kurnia Meiga	7 May 1990 (aged 24)	(Football Association of Indonesia) Arema Cronus
3	DF	Zulkifli Syukur	3 May 1984 (aged 30)	(Football Association of Indonesia) Mitra Kukar
4	DF	Victor Igbonefo	10 October 1985 (aged 29)	(Football Association of Indonesia) Arema Cronus
5	MF	Ramdhani Lestaluhu	5 November 1991 (aged 23)	(Football Association of Indonesia) Persija Jakarta
6	MF	Evan Dimas	13 March 1995 (aged 19)	(Football Association of Indonesia) Bhayangkara
7	FW	Boaz Solossa	16 March 1986 (aged 28)	(Football Association of Indonesia) Persipura Jayapura
8	MF	Raphael Maitimo	17 March 1984 (aged 30)	(Football Association of Indonesia) Mitra Kukar
9	FW	Cristian Gonzáles	30 August 1976 (aged 38)	(Football Association of Indonesia) Arema Cronus
11	FW	Rizky Pora	22 November 1989 (aged 25)	(Football Association of Indonesia) Barito Putera
12	GK	I Made Wirawan	1 December 1981 (aged 32)	(Football Association of Indonesia) Persib Bandung
13	DF	Achmad Jufriyanto	7 February 1987 (aged 27)	(Football Association of Indonesia) Persib Bandung
14	MF	Imanuel Wanggai	23 February 1988 (aged 26)	(Football Association of Indonesia) Persipura Jayapura
15	MF	Firman Utina (captain)	15 December 1981 (aged 32)	(Football Association of Indonesia) Persib Bandung
16	DF	Muhammad Roby	12 September 1985 (aged 29)	(Football Association of Indonesia) Putra Samarinda
17	FW	Zulham Zamrun	19 February 1988 (aged 26)	(Football Association of Indonesia) Mitra Kukar
18	FW	Samsul Arif	14 January 1985 (aged 29)	(Football Association of Indonesia) Arema Cronus
20	FW	Sergio van Dijk	6 August 1982 (aged 32)	(Football Association of Thailand) Suphanburi
22	DF	Supardi Nasir	9 April 1983 (aged 31)	(Football Association of Indonesia) Persib Bandung
23	FW	Muhammad Ridwan	8 July 1980 (aged 34)	(Football Association of Indonesia) Persib Bandung
24	MF	Hariono	2 October 1985 (aged 29)	(Football Association of Indonesia) Persib Bandung
25	MF	Manahati Lestusen	17 December 1993 (aged 20)	(Football Association of Indonesia) Bhayangkara
27	DF	Fachrudin Aryanto	19 February 1989 (aged 25)	(Football Association of Indonesia) Persepam Madura Utama
30	GK	Dian Agus	3 August 1985 (aged 29)	(Football Association of Indonesia) Mitra Kukar

=== Laos ===
Head coach: (England) David Booth

No.	Pos.	Player	Date of birth (age)	Club
2	DF	Saynakhonevieng Phommapanya	28 October 1988 (aged 26)	(Lao Football Federation) Lao Toyota
3	DF	Khamla Pinkeo	23 November 1990 (aged 23)	(Lao Football Federation) Lao Police Club
4	DF	Ketsada Souksavanh (captain)	23 November 1992 (aged 21)	(Lao Football Federation) Lao Toyota
5	DF	Saychon Khunsamnam	13 January 1993 (aged 21)	(Lao Football Federation) Lao Police Club
6	MF	Phoutdavy Phommasane	2 February 1994 (aged 20)	(Lao Football Federation) Hoàng Anh Attapeu
7	MF	Khonesavanh Sihavong	10 October 1994 (aged 20)	(Lao Football Federation) Lao Police Club
8	MF	Keoviengphet Liththideth	30 November 1992 (aged 21)	(Lao Football Federation) Ezra
9	FW	Sitthideth Khanthavong	9 February 1994 (aged 20)	(Lao Football Federation) Lao Toyota
10	MF	Soukaphone Vongchiengkham	9 March 1992 (aged 22)	(Football Association of Thailand) Saraburi
11	MF	Maitee Hatsady	6 October 1998 (aged 16)	(Lao Football Federation) Lao Toyota
12	MF	Phatthana Syvilay	4 October 1990 (aged 24)	(Lao Football Federation) Lao Toyota
13	MF	Bounthavy Sipasong	4 July 1996 (aged 18)	(Lao Football Federation) Hoàng Anh Attapeu
15	MF	Phoutthasay Khochalern	29 December 1995 (aged 18)	(Lao Football Federation) Ezra
16	DF	Thenthong Phonsettha	19 October 1993 (aged 21)	(Lao Football Federation) Lao Toyota
17	MF	Vilayuth Sayyabounsou	27 November 1992 (aged 21)	(Lao Football Federation) Ezra
18	GK	Seng-athit Somvang	2 June 1991 (aged 23)	(Lao Football Federation) Lao Police Club
19	DF	Sengdao Inthilath	3 June 1994 (aged 20)	(Lao Football Federation) Lao Police Club
20	MF	Paseuthsack Souliyavong	26 October 1990 (aged 24)	(Lao Football Federation) Hoàng Anh Attapeu
21	MF	Tiny Bounmalay	6 June 1993 (aged 21)	(Lao Football Federation) Lao Police Club
25	FW	Khampheng Sayavutthi	19 July 1986 (aged 28)	(Football Association of Thailand) Ang Thong
26	DF	Odomsith Singlatsomboun	10 May 1989 (aged 25)	(Lao Football Federation) Hoàng Anh Attapeu
35	GK	Soukthavy Soundala	4 November 1995 (aged 19)	(Lao Football Federation) Ezra

== Group B ==
=== Singapore ===
Head coach: (Germany) Bernd Stange

No.	Pos.	Player	Date of birth (age)	Club
1	GK	Izwan Mahbud	14 July 1990 (aged 24)	(Football Association of Malaysia) LionsXII
2	DF	Shakir Hamzah	10 October 1992 (aged 22)	(Football Association of Malaysia) LionsXII
3	DF	Shaiful Esah	12 May 1986 (aged 28)	(Football Association of Singapore) Tampines Rovers
4	DF	Afiq Yunos	10 December 1990 (aged 23)	(Football Association of Malaysia) LionsXII
5	DF	Baihakki Khaizan	31 January 1984 (aged 30)	(Football Association of Malaysia) LionsXII
7	FW	Gabriel Quak	22 December 1990 (aged 23)	(Football Association of Malaysia) LionsXII
8	MF	Shahdan Sulaiman	9 May 1988 (aged 26)	(Football Association of Singapore) Tampines Rovers
10	FW	Fazrul Nawaz	17 April 1985 (aged 29)	(Football Association of Singapore) Home United
11	FW	Faris Ramli	24 August 1992 (aged 22)	(Football Association of Malaysia) LionsXII
12	DF	Amirul Adli	13 January 1996 (aged 18)	(Football Association of Singapore) Courts Young Lions
13	MF	Ismadi Mukhtar	16 December 1983 (aged 30)	(Football Association of Singapore) Tampines Rovers
14	MF	Hariss Harun	19 November 1990 (aged 24)	(Football Association of Malaysia) Johor Darul Takzim
16	DF	Al-Qaasimy Rahman	21 January 1992 (aged 22)	(Football Association of Singapore) Courts Young Lions
17	MF	Shahril Ishak (captain)	23 January 1984 (aged 30)	(Football Association of Malaysia) Johor Darul Takzim II
18	GK	Hassan Sunny	2 April 1984 (aged 30)	(Football Association of Singapore) Warriors
19	FW	Khairul Amri	15 March 1985 (aged 29)	(Football Association of Malaysia) LionsXII
20	FW	Khairul Nizam	25 June 1991 (aged 23)	(Football Association of Malaysia) LionsXII
21	DF	Safuwan Baharudin	22 September 1991 (aged 23)	(Football Association of Malaysia) LionsXII
23	MF	Zulfahmi Arifin	5 October 1991 (aged 23)	(Football Association of Malaysia) LionsXII
26	MF	Shahfiq Ghani	17 March 1992 (aged 22)	(Football Association of Malaysia) LionsXII
28	MF	Hafiz Abu Sujad	12 January 1990 (aged 24)	(Football Association of Malaysia) LionsXII
32	FW	Sahil Suhaimi	8 July 1992 (aged 22)	(Football Association of Singapore) Courts Young Lions

=== Malaysia ===
Head coach: Dollah Salleh

No.	Pos.	Player	Date of birth (age)	Club
1	GK	Mohd Farizal Marlias	29 June 1986 (aged 28)	(Football Association of Malaysia) Selangor
2	DF	Mohd Afif Amiruddin	22 March 1984 (aged 30)	(Football Association of Malaysia) PDRM
4	FW	Mahali Jasuli	2 April 1989 (aged 25)	(Football Association of Malaysia) Johor Darul Takzim
8	MF	Mohd Safiq Rahim (captain)	5 July 1987 (aged 27)	(Football Association of Malaysia) Johor Darul Takzim
9	FW	Norshahrul Idlan	8 June 1986 (aged 28)	(Football Association of Malaysia) Johor Darul Takzim
10	FW	Safee Sali	28 January 1984 (aged 30)	(Football Association of Malaysia) Johor Darul Takzim
11	DF	Mohd Azmi Muslim	17 October 1986 (aged 28)	(Football Association of Malaysia) Selangor
12	DF	Shukor Adan	24 September 1979 (aged 35)	(Football Association of Malaysia) FELDA United
13	FW	Indra Putra Mahayuddin	2 September 1981 (aged 33)	(Football Association of Malaysia) FELDA United
14	MF	Badhri Radzi	2 June 1982 (aged 32)	(Football Association of Malaysia) Kelantan
15	MF	Gary Steven Robbat	3 September 1992 (aged 22)	(Football Association of Malaysia) Harimau Muda A
16	MF	S. Kunanlan	15 April 1986 (aged 28)	(Football Association of Malaysia) Selangor
17	FW	Mohd Amri Yahyah	21 January 1981 (aged 33)	(Football Association of Malaysia) Johor Darul Takzim
18	FW	Abdul Manaf Mamat	8 April 1987 (aged 27)	(Football Association of Malaysia) Terengganu
19	FW	Azamuddin Akil	16 April 1985 (aged 29)	(Football Association of Malaysia) Pahang
20	MF	Mohd Hafiz Kamal	9 July 1987 (aged 27)	(Football Association of Malaysia) Pahang
21	DF	Zubir Azmi	14 November 1991 (aged 23)	(Football Association of Malaysia) Terengganu
22	GK	Khairul Fahmi Che Mat	7 January 1989 (aged 25)	(Football Association of Malaysia) Kelantan
23	MF	Baddrol Bakhtiar	1 February 1988 (aged 26)	(Football Association of Malaysia) Kedah
24	DF	Muslim Ahmad	25 April 1989 (aged 25)	(Football Association of Malaysia) PDRM
27	DF	Fadhli Shas	21 January 1991 (aged 23)	(Football Association of Malaysia) Johor Darul Takzim
28	GK	Khairul Azhan Khalid	7 November 1989 (aged 25)	(Football Association of Malaysia) Pahang

=== Thailand ===
Head coach: Kiatisuk Senamuang

No.	Pos.	Player	Date of birth (age)	Club
1	GK	Kawin Thamsatchanan	26 January 1990 (aged 24)	(Football Association of Thailand) Muangthong United
2	DF	Peerapat Notechaiya	4 February 1993 (aged 21)	(Football Association of Thailand) BEC Tero Sasana
3	DF	Pravinwat Boonyong	13 February 1990 (aged 24)	(Football Association of Thailand) Bangkok Glass
4	MF	Kroekrit Thaweekarn	19 November 1990 (aged 24)	(Football Association of Thailand) Chonburi
5	DF	Suttinan Phuk-hom	29 November 1987 (aged 26)	(Football Association of Thailand) Chonburi
6	MF	Sarach Yooyen	30 May 1992 (aged 22)	(Football Association of Thailand) Muangthong United
7	MF	Charyl Chappuis	12 January 1992 (aged 22)	(Football Association of Thailand) Suphanburi
8	DF	Atit Daosawang	11 November 1992 (aged 22)	(Football Association of Thailand) Muangthong United
9	FW	Adisak Kraisorn	1 February 1991 (aged 23)	(Football Association of Thailand) Buriram United
10	FW	Kirati Keawsombat	12 January 1987 (aged 27)	(Football Association of Thailand) PTT Rayong
11	MF	Mongkol Tossakrai	5 September 1987 (aged 27)	(Football Association of Thailand) Army United
12	MF	Prakit Deeprom	7 January 1988 (aged 26)	(Football Association of Thailand) TOT
13	DF	Narubadin Weerawatnodom	12 July 1994 (aged 20)	(Football Association of Thailand) BEC Tero Sasana
14	MF	Sarawut Masuk	3 June 1990 (aged 24)	(Football Association of Thailand) Muangthong United
15	DF	Chayaphat Kitpongsrithada	23 May 1983 (aged 31)	(Football Association of Thailand) BEC Tero Sasana
16	DF	Adison Promrak	21 October 1993 (aged 21)	(Football Association of Thailand) BEC Tero Sasana
17	DF	Tanaboon Kesarat	21 September 1993 (aged 21)	(Football Association of Thailand) BEC Tero Sasana
18	MF	Chanathip Songkrasin	5 October 1993 (aged 21)	(Football Association of Thailand) BEC Tero Sasana
19	MF	Adul Lahsoh (captain)	19 September 1986 (aged 28)	(Football Association of Thailand) Chonburi
20	GK	Chanin Sae-ear	5 July 1992 (aged 22)	(Football Association of Thailand) Singhtarua
21	FW	Chainarong Tathong	31 January 1987 (aged 27)	(Football Association of Thailand) Army United
22	FW	Sompong Soleb	30 July 1986 (aged 28)	(Football Association of Thailand) Bangkok United

=== Myanmar ===
Head coach: (Serbia) Radojko Avramovic

No.	Pos.	Player	Date of birth (age)	Club
1	GK	Thiha Sithu (captain)	3 July 1988 (aged 26)	(Myanmar Football Federation) Yadanarbon
2	DF	Aung Zaw	5 March 1990 (aged 24)	(Myanmar Football Federation) Yangon United
3	DF	Zaw Min Tun	20 May 1992 (aged 22)	(Myanmar Football Federation) Yadanarbon
4	DF	David Htan	13 May 1990 (aged 24)	(Myanmar Football Federation) Yangon United
5	DF	Khin Maung Lwin	27 December 1988 (aged 25)	(Myanmar Football Federation) Yangon United
6	MF	Yan Aung Kyaw	4 August 1989 (aged 25)	(Myanmar Football Federation) Yangon United
7	MF	Kyaw Zayar Win	2 May 1991 (aged 23)	(Myanmar Football Federation) Kanbawza
8	MF	Min Min Thu	30 March 1988 (aged 26)	(Myanmar Football Federation) Ayeyawady United
10	FW	Kyaw Ko Ko	20 December 1992 (aged 21)	(Myanmar Football Federation) Yangon United
12	MF	Sithu Aung	16 October 1996 (aged 18)	(Myanmar Football Federation) Yadanarbon
13	MF	Chit Su Moe	4 December 1994 (aged 19)	(Myanmar Football Federation) Chin United
18	GK	Kyaw Zin Phyo	1 February 1994 (aged 20)	(Myanmar Football Federation) Magway
19	MF	Aung Kyaw Naing	20 December 1994 (aged 19)	(Myanmar Football Federation) Nay Pyi Taw
21	MF	Tin Win Aung	14 April 1992 (aged 22)	(Myanmar Football Federation) Zwekapin United
24	DF	Win Min Htut	6 April 1986 (aged 28)	(Myanmar Football Federation) GFA
25	FW	Soe Min Oo	8 March 1988 (aged 26)	(Myanmar Football Federation) Kanbawza
27	DF	Nay Myo Aung	15 October 1990 (aged 24)	(Myanmar Football Federation) GFA
28	MF	Nanda Lin Kyaw Chit	27 June 1991 (aged 23)	(Myanmar Football Federation) Ayeyawady United
32	MF	Nyein Chan Aung	18 August 1996 (aged 18)	(Myanmar Football Federation) Manawmye
33	MF	Kyi Lin	4 September 1992 (aged 22)	(Myanmar Football Federation) Yangon United
35	FW	Than Paing	6 December 1996 (aged 17)	(Myanmar Football Federation) Yangon United

== Statistics ==
=== Player representation by league system ===
Country	Players	Outside national squad
Thailand	25	3
Malaysia	24	2
Myanmar	22	0
Vietnam	22	0
Indonesia	21	0
Laos	20	0
Singapore	20	0
Philippines	19	0
