= 2005 Lao League =

Lao League
- Season: 2005

Statistics of Lao League for the 2005 season.

== Overview ==
It was contested by 11 teams, and Vientiane FC won the championship.

== League standings ==
Pos	Team	Pld	W	D	L	GF	GA	GD	Pts	Qualification or relegation
1	Vientiane FC (C)	20	16	3	1	61	15	+46	51	
2	Yotha FC	20	14	4	2	65	14	+51	46	
3	Lao Police Club	20	12	2	6	40	26	+14	38	
4	Lao-American College FC	20	10	6	4	46	18	+28	36	
5	Lao Army FC	20	11	3	6	38	29	+9	36	
6	Bank FC	20	9	6	5	16	33	−17	33	
7	National University (Laos)	20	8	3	9	33	29	+4	27	
8	Lao Journalists' Association FC	20	7	2	11	41	38	+3	23	
9	Prime Minister's Office FC	20	3	1	16	12	72	−60	10	Qualification for Relegation Play-off
10	Na Video FC (R)	20	2	2	16	14	67	−53	8	Relegation to 2005 Lao League 2
11	No. 8 Road Construction FC (R)	20	1	2	17	10	71	−61	5	Relegation to 2005 Lao League 2

Updated to match(es) played on 24 October 2012. Source: Lao 2004 from RSSSF.com
Rules for classification: 1) points; 2) goal difference; 3) number of goals scored.
(C) Champions; (R) Relegated

Note: National Radio withdrew before the start of the season.

== Relegation playoff ==
Vilakone FC and Kavin College FC were automatically promoted from Lao League 2. A play off was held between the third place team and the third bottom team in the top division.

Prime Minister's Office FC	Beat	Trio FC
	Source
