= 2004 Prime Minister's Cup =

Prime Minister's Cup
Tournament details
- Country: Laos
- Dates: ?? Oct - 29 Dec 2004
- Teams: 20

Final positions
- Champions: Vientiane FC
- Runners-up: Savannakhet FC

Tournament statistics
- Matches played: 16
- Goals scored: 51 (3.19 per match)

The 2004 Prime Minister's Cup was the second national football cup competition in Laos. The competition was won by Vientiane FC, who beat Savannakhet FC 2-1 in the final.

== Format ==
The competition began with a regional qualifying tournament involving sixteen provincial teams from outside Vientiane. These teams were divided into four groups of four and they played qualifying matches during October and November. The top team in each group qualified for the next stage. At this stage, the top four teams from the 2004 Lao League joined. These eight teams were then split into two groups and a further round robin series of matches was played. The top two teams from each group qualified for the semi-final knockout round to determine the two teams that would contest the final. The losers of the semi-finals met in a third place playoff.

== Qualifying round ==
The following regional teams took part in the qualifying round. Although there are no reported results, Savannakhet, Champassak, Luang Prabang and Bokeo qualified for the next round and apparently either Bokeo or Luang Prabang were moved to Group A following the draw.

=== Group A ===
All matches were played in Luang Namtha.

- Luang Namtha
- Oudomxay
- Huaphanh
- Phonsaly

=== Group B ===
All matches were played in Xayaboury.

- Xayaboury
- Luang Prabang
- Bokeo
- Xieng Kuang

=== Group C ===
All matches were played in Savannakhet.

- Bolikhamsay
- Khammuan
- Vientiane Province
- Savannakhet

=== Group D ===
All matches were played in Champasak.

- Champasak
- Attapeu
- Sekong
- Saravan

== Group stage ==
The four qualifiers were drawn alongside the top four teams from the 2004 Lao League: Lao-American College FC, Lao Army FC, Vientiane FC and MCTPC FC (Ministry of Communication, Transportation and Construction). Vientiane FC, who finished fifth replaced National Public Security FC, who finished in fourth.

=== Group A ===
Pos	Team	Pld	W	D	L	GF	GA	GD	Pts	Qualification
1	Lao Army FC (A)	3	3	0	0	8	3	+5	9	Qualification for Semi-finals
2	Lao-American College FC (A)	3	2	0	1	6	3	+3	6	Qualification for Semi-finals
3	MCPTC FC	3	1	0	2	6	6	0	3	
4	SHB Champasak	3	0	0	3	2	10	−8	0	

Updated to match(es) played on 5 Dec 2007. Source: rsssf.com
Rules for classification: 1) points; 2) goal difference; 3) number of goals scored.
(A) Advance to a further round

==== Results ====
===== Round 1 =====
21 December 2004

Lao-American College FC	3-1	Champasak FC
Unknown	Source	Unknown

21 December 2004

Lao Army FC	4-2	MCTPC FC
Unknown	Source	Unknown

===== Round 2 =====
23 December 2004

MCTPC FC	5-0	Champasak FC
Unknown	Source	Unknown

23 December 2004

Lao Army FC	2-1	Lao-American College FC
Unknown	Source	Unknown

===== Round 3 =====
25 December 2004

Lao-American College FC	2-0	MCTPC FC
Unknown	Source	Unknown

25 December 2004

Lao Army FC	2-1	Champasak FC
Unknown	Source	Unknown

=== Group B ===
Pos	Team	Pld	W	D	L	GF	GA	GD	Pts	Qualification
1	Vientiane FC (A)	3	2	1	0	11	1	+10	7	Qualification for Semi-finals
2	Savannakhet FC (A)	3	1	2	0	4	3	+1	5	Qualification for Semi-finals
3	Luang Prabang FC	3	1	1	1	3	7	−4	4	
4	Bokeo FC	3	0	0	3	2	9	−7	0	

Updated to match(es) played on 5 Dec 2007. Source: rsssf.com
Rules for classification: 1) points; 2) goal difference; 3) number of goals scored.
(A) Advance to a further round

==== Results ====
===== Round 1 =====
22 December 2004

Bokeo FC	1-2	Savannakhet FC
Unknown	Source	Unknown

22 December 2004

Vientiane FC	5-0	Luang Prabang FC
Unknown	Source	Unknown

===== Round 2 =====
24 December 2004

Vientiane FC	1-1	Savannakhet FC
Unknown	Source	Unknown

24 December 2004

Bokeo FC	1-2	Luang Prabang FC
Unknown	Source	Unknown

===== Round 3 =====
25 December 2004

Vientiane FC	5-0	Bokeo FC
Unknown	Source	Unknown

25 December 2004

Savannakhet FC	1-1	Luang Prabang FC
Unknown	Source	Unknown

== Semi finals ==
25 December 2004

Lao Army FC	0-0	Savannakhet FC
Unknown	Source	Unknown
Penalties
Unknown	2-4	Unknown

25 December 2004

Vientiane FC	3-0	Lao-American College FC
Unknown	Source	Unknown

== Third place playoff ==
28 December 2004

Lao Army FC	2-1	Lao-American College FC
Unknown	Source	Unknown

== Final ==
25 December 2004

Vientiane FC	2-1 (a.e.t.)	Savannakhet FC
Saiyavong 89'; Thilavane 102'	Source	Lok-aphone 44'

National Stadium
