= Kiengthavesak Xayxanapanya =

Laotian association football player

Personal information
- Date of birth: 14 March 1999 (age 27)
- Place of birth: Vientiane, Laos
- Height: 1.70 m (5 ft 7 in)
- Position: Forward

Team information
- Current team: Mazda GB
- Number: 7

Senior career*
Years	Team	Apps	(Gls)
2018	Lao Police Club	1	(0)
2018–2019	Young Elephants	5	(4)
2020	Master 7	11	(8)
2021	Chanthabouly	1	(0)
2025	Viengchanh	6	(1)
2025–	Mazda GB	2	(0)

International career^{‡}
2018–2021	Laos U23	4	(0)
2018–2019	Laos	4	(0)
- * Club domestic league appearances and goals as of August 8, 2020 ‡ National team caps and goals as of May 31, 2019

Kiengthavesak Xayxanapanya (Lao: ກຽງທະວີສັກ ໄຊຊະນະປັນຍາ, born 14 March 1999) is a Laotian footballer currently playing as a forward for Mazda GB in the Lao League 1.

He started his career with Lao Police Club then went ahead to sign up for Young Elephants where he played just one match. He was signed by Master 7 the following season and made his debut in the matchday 1 fixture against Lao Toyota which he scored. As a Laotian International, he was part of the Laos U23 team at the 2018 Asian Games where he played all group stage matches. He has also played thrice for the Laos national football team.

== Club ==
As of match played on 8 August 2020

Club	Season	Competition	Apps	Goals
Young Elephants	2019	Lao League 1	1	0
Total			1	0
Master 7	2020	Lao League 1	5	4
Total			5	4
Career total			6	4

== International ==
As of matches played 31 May 2019.

National team	Year	Apps	Goals
Laos U23	2018	4	0
Total		4	0
Laos	2018	2	0
Laos	2019	1	0
Total		3	0
