= 2012 Lao League =

Lao League
- Season: 2012
- Champions: Lao Police Club
- Relegated: Eastern Star FC

Statistics of Lao League in the 2012 season.

== Clubs ==
- Eastern Star FC
- Ezra FC
- Lao Airlines FC
- Lao-American College FC
- Lao Army FC
- Lao Lane Xang FC
- Lao Police Club
- Pheuanphatthana FC
- Vientiane FC
- Yotha FC (previously Ministry of Public Works and Transport FC)

== League table ==
Pos	Team	Pld	W	D	L	GF	GA	GD	Pts	Qualification or relegation
1	Lao Police Club (C)	18	14	2	2	70	13	+57	44	
2	Yotha FC	18	14	1	3	82	17	+65	43	
3	Vientiane FC	18	11	5	2	82	20	+62	38	
4	Lao Army FC	18	11	3	4	71	29	+42	36	
5	Ezra FC	18	9	4	5	72	25	+47	31	
6	Lao Airlines FC	18	7	3	8	38	33	+5	24	
7	Lao-American College FC	18	6	0	12	37	38	−1	18	
8	Pheuanphatthana FC	18	5	0	13	16	76	−60	15	
9	Lao Lane Xang FC	18	2	1	15	16	152	−136	7	
10	Eastern Star FC (R)	18	1	1	16	14	97	−83	4	Relegation

Updated to match(es) played on May 4, 2011. Source:
Rules for classification: 1) points; 2) goal difference; 3) number of goals scored.
(C) Champions; (R) Relegated
