= 2010 Lao League =

Lao League
- Season: 2010

Statistics of Lao League in the 2010 season.

== Clubs ==
- Lao Army FC
- Bank FC
- City Copy Center FC
- Ezra FC
- Lao-American College FC
- Ministry of Public Security (MPS)
- Ministry of Public Works and Transport FC
- Vientiane FC

The season ran from 27 February to 11 April and all matches were played on Saturdays and Sundays at the Chao Anouvong Stadium in Vientiane. Bank of Laos were champions.
