= Saychon Khunsamnam =

Laotian footballer

Saison Khounsamnan
Personal information
- Full name: Saison Khounsamnan
- Date of birth: 13 January 1993 (age 33)
- Place of birth: Laos
- Height: 1.70 m (5 ft 7 in)
- Position: Defender

Team information
- Current team: Master 7 FC

Senior career*
Years	Team	Apps	(Gls)
2014–15	Yotha F.C.	0	(0)
2015–17	Lao Police Club	0	(0)
2015-2018	Lao Toyota F.C.		
2019-2020	Master 7 FC		
2021	Young Elephant FC		
2022-	Master 7 FC		

International career^{‡}
2014–	Laos U-23	3	(0)
2014–	Laos	6	(0)
- * Club domestic league appearances and goals as of 11:54, 18 November 2014 (UTC) ‡ National team caps and goals as of 11:54, 18 November 2014 (UTC)

Saison Khounsamnam (born 13 January 1993) is a Laotian professional footballer who currently plays as a defender for Master 7 FC in the Lao League 1. Season 2021

== International career ==
Saison Khounsamnan played for the Laos U-23 team and also the Laos national football team. He appeared in the AFF Cup 2014.
