= 2004 Lao League =

Lao League
- Season: 2004

Statistics of Lao League for the 2004 season.

== Overview ==
It was contested by 11 teams, and MCTPC won the championship.

== League standings ==
Pos	Team	Pld	W	D	L	GF	GA	GD	Pts	Qualification or relegation
1	MCTPC FC (C)	20	18	1	1	94	10	+84	55	
2	Lao-American College FC	20	12	5	3	48	11	+37	41	
3	Lao Army FC	20	8	9	3	40	26	+14	33	
4	Lao Police Club	20	10	3	7	42	33	+9	33	
5	Vientiane FC	20	9	5	6	42	45	−3	32	
6	National University (Laos)	20	6	7	7	35	28	+7	25	
7	Bank FC	20	8	1	11	33	39	−6	25	
8	Kanlanga FC	20	7	4	9	19	35	−16	25	
9	Thongkahnkham South (R)	20	5	4	11	34	69	−35	19	Qualification for Relegation Play-off
10	Net Tech (R)	20	4	4	12	24	52	−28	16	Relegation to 2005 Lao League 2
11	Public Health Ministry (R)	20	0	3	17	14	77	−63	3	Relegation to 2005 Lao League 2

Updated to match(es) played on 24 October 2012. Source: Lao 2004 from RSSSF.com
Rules for classification: 1) points; 2) goal difference; 3) number of goals scored.
National Radio withdrew before the start of the season.
(C) Champions; (R) Relegated

== Results ==
Home \ Away	BAN	KAN	ARM	LAC	POL	NAT	NET	PUB	THO	VIE	MCT
Bank FC		1–0	2–3	2–1	1–5	3–0	3–0	1–1	2–4	0–1	1–2
Kanlanga FC	1–0		0–2	0–3	1–3	2–0	2–2	3–1	3–2	0–1	0–4
Lao Army FC	1–0	0–0		2–1	0–2	1–1	5–1	7–1	1–1	2–2	0–4
Lao-American College FC	3–0	0–0	1–1		0–0	1–0	2–0	7–1	6–1	4–0	1–0
Lao Police Club	3–1	0–1	2–1	0–3		1–1	1–0	6–1	3–4	2–3	0–7
National University (Laos)	0–1	0–1	2–2	0–3	1–0		5–1	4–0	5–1	2–4	0–1
Net Tech	3–0	1–2	0–0	1–1	0–7	1–2		3–1	2–2	1–4	0–3
Public Health Ministry	3–3	1–2	1–1	1–3	0–1	1–2	0–1		2–2	0–8	0–9
Thongkahnkham South	0–4	2–0	0–3	1–3	4–5	1–6	2–4	3–0		1–1	1–8
Vientiane FC	5–4	1–1	0–3	0–6	1–3	1–6	4–2	3–0	0–2		0–7
MCTPC FC	4–1	8–1	1–1	1–0	2–1	4–0	4–2	3–0	11–0	3–1	

Updated to match(es) played on 5 December 2007. Source: Lao 2004 - RSSSF.com
Legend: Blue = home team win; Yellow = draw; Red = away team win.

== Relegation playoff ==
Prime Minister's Office FC and No-8 Road Construction FC were automatically promoted from Lao League 2. A play off was held between the third place team and the third bottom team in the top division.

Week before Sept 15, 2004

Na Video FC	3 - 2	Thongkahnkham South
	Source
