= 2011 Prime Minister's Cup =

Prime Minister's Cup
Celebration Football Tournament

Tournament details
- Country: Laos
- Dates: 2 March – 21 May 2011
- Teams: 4

Final positions
- Champions: Bank FC
- Runners-up: Police FC

Tournament statistics
- Matches played: 7
- Goals scored: 16 (2.29 per match)

The 2011 Prime Minister's Cup was the sixth national football cup competition in Laos. The competition was won by Bank FC, who beat Police FC 2–1 in the final.

== Format ==
The top four teams from the 2010 Lao League competed in a single group round robin stage from which the top two teams competed in a one-legged final. This was the first season where full records exist that there was no representation from any of the regional teams.

=== Group stage ===
Pos	Team	Pld	W	D	L	GF	GA	GD	Pts	Qualification
1	Lao Police Club (A)	3	2	1	0	4	0	+4	7	Qualification for Final
2	Bank FC (A)	3	1	1	1	5	5	0	4	Qualification for Final
3	Ezra Training Centre FC	3	1	0	2	3	5	−2	3	
4	MPWT FC	3	1	0	2	3	5	−2	3	

Updated to match(es) played on 21 May 2011. Source: rsssf.com
Rules for classification: 1) points; 2) goal difference; 3) number of goals scored.
(A) Advance to a further round

==== Results ====
===== Round 1 =====
2 March 2011

Bank FC	0-0	Police FC
Unknown	Source	Unknown

2 March 2011

MPWT FC	1-0	Ezra Training Centre FC
Unknown	Source	Unknown

===== Round 2 =====
9 March 2011

Police FC	1-0	MPWT FC
Unknown	Source	Unknown

9 March 2011

Ezra Training Centre FC	3-1	Bank FC
Unknown	Source	Unknown

===== Round 3 =====
19 May 2011

Ezra Training Centre FC	0-3	Police FC
Unknown	Source	Unknown

19 May 2011

MPWT FC	2-4	Bank FC
Unknown	Source	Unknown

== Final ==
21 May 2011

Bank FC	1-0	Police FC
Phimmase 48'	Source
