= 2011 Lao League =

Lao League
- Season: 2011

Statistics of Lao League in the 2011 season.

== Clubs ==
- Lao Army FC
- Bank F.C.
- Eastern Star Bilingual School FC
- Ezra FC
- Lao-American College FC
- Lao Lane Xang FC
- Pheuanphatthana FC
- Lao Police Club (formerly Ministry of Public Security FC (MPS))
- Vientiane F.C.
- Yotha FC (formerly Ministry of Public Works and Transport FC)

Yotha FC were champions.
