= 2020 Lao League 1 =

Lao League 1
- Season: 2020
- Champions: Lao Toyota
- Relegated: Vientiane
- 2021 AFC Cup: Lao Toyota
- 2022 AFC Cup: Young Elephants
- Matches: 84
- Goals: 61 (0.73 per match)
- Top goalscorer: Keoviengphet Liththideth (10) goals
- Highest attendance: 2,000, Lao Toyota 1-1 Master 7

The 2020 Lao Premier League was the 31st season of the Lao League 1. The season started on 12 July 2020. It was played in triple round-robin format, with 15 total rounds.

This is the first season of Laos' national football league under the name Lao League 1.

== Teams ==
A total of 7 teams participate in the 2020 Lao League 1 season.

Locations of the 2019 Lao Premier League teams

=== Stadia ===
Note: Table lists in alphabetical order.

Team	Stadium	Capacity
Ezra	New Laos National Stadium	25,000
Lao Police	New Laos National Stadium	25,000
Lao Toyota	New Laos National Stadium	25,000
Master 7	New Laos National Stadium	25,000
Viengchanh	New Laos National Stadium	25,000
Vientiane	New Laos National Stadium	25,000
Young Elephants	New Laos National Stadium	25,000

== Foreign players ==
The number of foreign players is restricted to four per team. A team can use four foreign players on the field in each game, including at least one player from the AFC region.

Players name in bold indicates the player is registered during the mid-season transfer window.

Club	Player 1	Player 2	Player 3	Asian Player	Former Players
Ezra	(South Korea) Su-young Yoo				
Lao Toyota	(Brazil) Laércio Gomes Costa	(Ivory Coast) Youssouf Mory Bamba	(Japan) Shuya Akamatsu	(Japan) Kazuo Homma	(Japan) Norihiro Kawakami (France) Goran Jerkovic
Lao Police					
Master 7	(Mali) Souleymane Coulibaly	(Japan) Kosuke Uchida	(Japan) Shota Wada		(Sierra Leone) Abu Kanu (Kyrgyzstan) Islam Shamshiev
Vientiane FT	(Ivory Coast) Adama Diomande				
Viengchanh	(Japan) Kazu Yanagidate	(Japan) Takuya Watanabe	(Japan) Takaya Sugasawa	(Japan) Shuta Ishino	
Young Elephant	(Japan) Norihiro Kawakami	(Nigeria) Murphy Ebedi	(Sierra Leone) Abu Kanu	(Japan) Takumu Nishihara	

== League table ==
Pos	Team	Pld	W	D	L	GF	GA	GD	Pts	
1	Lao Toyota	12	10	2	0	31	5	+26	32	Qualification to 2021 AFC Cup Play-Off
2	Master 7	12	7	4	1	32	17	+15	25	
3	Young Elephants	12	5	2	5	25	11	+14	17	Qualification to 2022 AFC Cup Group Stage
4	Ezra	12	4	4	4	23	17	+6	16	
5	Lao Police Club	12	3	3	6	17	23	−6	12	
6	Viengchanh	12	3	3	6	12	29	−17	12	
7	Vientiane	12	0	2	10	9	47	−38	2	

Updated to match(es) played on 13 September 2020. Source: Soccerway

== Results ==
Home \ Away	EZR	LPC	LTO	MAS	VNG	VNT	YOU
Ezra	—	0–0	0–4	3–2	0–1	5–0	0–1
Lao Police Club	1–5	—	0–4	3–4	2–1	0–0	1–3
Lao Toyota	2–1	3–1	—	0–0	3–0	3–0	2–1
Master 7	2–2	3–1	1–1	—	4–0	5–2	1–0
Viengchanh	1–1	0–3	1–5	3–3	—	3–3	0–5
Vientiane	2–5	0–5	0–2	1–5	0–1	—	0–6
Young Elephants	1–1	0–0	0–2	1–2	0–1	7–1	—

Updated to match(es) played on 13 September 2020. Source: Soccerway
Legend: Blue = home team win; Yellow = draw; Red = away team win.
