= Bounlap Khenkitisack =

Laotian footballer and manager

Personal information
- Date of birth: 19 June 1966 (age 60)
- Place of birth: Laos

Team information
- Current team: Chanthabouly (head coach)

Senior career*
Years	Team	Apps	(Gls)
- Yotha F.C.

Managerial career
- 2004–2005: Laos
- 2011: Laos
- 2016–2017: Lao Toyota
- 2019–2020: Vientiane United
- 2020: Young Elephants F.C
- 2022: Vientiane FT
- 2025: BIS Master
- 2026–: Chanthabouly
- * Club domestic league appearances and goals

Bounlap Khenkitisack (born 18 June 1966) is a Laotian professional footballer and football manager. He played for Yotha F.C. From October 2004 to 2005, and from January to February 2011, he coached the Laos national football team. As of 2026, he manages Chanthabouly in Lao League 1.

== International goals ==
No.	Date	Venue	Opponent	Score	Result	Competition
1.	11 September 1996	Jurong Stadium, Jurong, Singapore	Myanmar	1–2	2–4	1996 AFF Championship
2.	5 October 1997	Senayan Stadium, Jakarta, Indonesia	Indonesia	1–3	2–5	1997 SEA Games
3.	9 April 2000	Dongdaemun Stadium, Seoul, South Korea	Mongolia	1–0	2–1	2000 AFC Asian Cup qualification

== Manager ==
Lao Toyota

- Lao Premier League Champions (1); 2017

Young Elephant F.C

- Pepsi Lao League 1

Champions (1); 2021
