= 2014 Lao League =

Lao League
- Season: 2014
- Champions: Hoang Anh Attapeu
- Matches: 18
- Goals: 36 (2 per match)
- Longest winning run: Hoang Anh Attapeu; Lao Army; Lao Police Club; 2 games
- Longest unbeaten run: Hoang Anh Attapeu; Lane Xang Intra; Lao Police Club; 3 games
- Longest winless run: Eastern Star; 3 games
- Longest losing run: Eastern Star; Lao Toyota; Yotha; 2 games

Statistics of Lao League in the 2014 season. The league is composed of 10 clubs starts on 22 February 2014. SHB Champasak are the defending champions, having won their first league title in 2013.

== Teams ==
- SHB Champasak
- Ezra
- Hoang Anh Attapeu
- Lanexang Intra FC
- Lao Police Club
- Eastern Star FC
- Yotha FC

=== Relegation to Lao First Division ===
- Pheuanphatthana FC

=== Promotion from Lao First Division ===
- Lao Army
- Lao Toyota FC
- Savan FC

== League table ==
Pos	Team	Pld	W	D	L	GF	GA	GD	Pts	Qualification
1	Hoang Anh Attapeu	18	13	3	2	63	29	+34	42	Qualification for the Mekong Club Championship
2	Lao Toyota FC	18	12	2	4	56	19	+37	38	Qualification for the AFC Cup Group stage
3	SHB Champasak	18	11	3	4	43	19	+24	36	
4	Lao Police Club	18	10	3	5	45	25	+20	33	
5	Lanexang Intra	18	10	3	5	28	22	+6	33	
6	Ezra	18	8	3	7	31	31	0	27	
7	Lao Army	18	6	5	7	26	26	0	23	
8	Yotha FC	18	3	1	14	28	73	−45	10	
9	Savan FC	18	2	2	14	19	48	−29	8	
10	Eastern Star FC	18	1	3	14	18	65	−47	6	

Updated to match(es) played on 31 July 2014. Source: Lao League table
Rules for classification: 1) points; 2) goal difference; 3) number of goals scored.
