= Shuya Akamatsu =

Japanese footballer

Shuya Akamatsu 赤松 秀哉
Personal information
- Date of birth: 19 May 1993 (age 33)
- Place of birth: Hokkaido, Japan
- Height: 1.81 m (5 ft 11 in)
- Position: Defender

Team information
- Current team: Briobecca Urayasu

Youth career
- 2009–2011: Otani Muroran High School

College career
Years	Team	Apps	(Gls)
2012–2015	Kanazawa Seiryo University		

Senior career*
Years	Team	Apps	(Gls)
2016–2018	ReinMeer Aomori	45	(8)
2019	Kasem Bundit University		
2019–2020	Surat Thani City FC		
2020	Chanthabouly	8	(0)
2021–2022	Vanraure Hachinohe	31	(3)
2023–	Briobecca Urayasu	0	(0)
- * Club domestic league appearances and goals as of 26 January 2023, 8:20 (UTC)

Shuya Akamatsu (赤松 秀哉, Akamatsu Shuya; born 19 May 1993) is a Japanese footballer playing as a centre-back. He currently play for Briobecca Urayasu.

== Career ==
Akamatsu begin first youth career with Otani Muroran High School in 2009 until 2011. He later entered to college in Kanazawa from 2012.

After graduation in Kanazawa Seiryo University in 2015, Akamatsu begin first professional career with ReinMeer Aomori for 2016 season. He left for the club in 2018 after three years at Aomori expiration contract.

On 26 December 2020, Akamatsu joined to J3 club, Vanraure Hachinohe for 2021 season. He left for the club in 2022 after ended of contract in Hachinohe for two years.

On 26 January 2023, Akamatsu announcement officially transfer to JFL promoted club, Briobecca Urayasu for ahead of 2023 season.

== Career statistics ==
=== Club ===
As of the start of 2023 season.

Club	Season	League			National Cup		League Cup		Other		Total	
Club	Season	Division	Apps	Goals	Apps	Goals	Apps	Goals	Apps	Goals	Apps	Goals
ReinMeer Aomori	2016	JFL	23	4	0	0	–		0	0	23	4
ReinMeer Aomori	2017	JFL	11	3	0	0	–		0	0	11	3
ReinMeer Aomori	2018	JFL	11	1	0	0	–		0	0	11	1
ReinMeer Aomori	Total		45	8	0	0	0	0	0	0	45	8
Chanthabouly	2020	Lao Premier League	8	0	2 (Note: Appearances in the Lao FF Cup)	0	–		0	0	10	0
Chanthabouly	Total		8	0	2	0	0	0	0	0	10	0
Vanraure Hachinohe	2021	J3 League	21	2	1 (Note: Appearances in the Emperor's Cup)	0	–		0	0	22	2
Vanraure Hachinohe	2022	J3 League	10	1	0	0	–		0	0	10	1
Vanraure Hachinohe	Total		31	3	1	0	0	0	0	0	32	3
Briobecca Urayasu	2023	JFL	0	0	0	0	–		0	0	0	0
Briobecca Urayasu	Total		0	0	0	0	0	0	0	0	0	0
Career total			84	11	7	0	0	0	0	0	91	11
