= Takumu Nishihara =

Japanese association football player

Personal information
- Full name: Takumu Nishihara
- Date of birth: 25 July 1992 (age 34)
- Place of birth: Akashi, Hyōgo, Japan
- Height: 1.78 m (5 ft 10 in)
- Position: Forward

Team information
- Current team: Persiba Balikpapan
- Number: 10

Youth career
- 2008–2010: Akashi Josai HS
- 2011–2014: Kansai University

Senior career*
| Years | Team | Apps | (Gls) |
| 2015–2016 | FC Tiamo Hirakata | 13 | (1) |
| 2016–2017 | Ayeyawady United | 12 | (9) |
| 2017–2018 | Nay Pyi Taw | 7 | (2) |
| 2018–2019 | Lao Toyota | 8 | (3) |
| 2019–2020 | Khon Kaen United | 14 | (6) |
| 2020 | Lamphun Warrior | | |
| 2020 | Young Elephants | 9 | (8) |
| 2022–2023 | Tiffy Army | 21 | (21) |
| 2023 | Visakha | 10 | (3) |
| 2024 | Lija Athletic | 6 | (2) |
| 2024–2025 | Young Elephants | 14 | (26) |
| 2025– | Persiba Balikpapan | 36 | (14) |
- * Club domestic league appearances and goals as of 8 November 2026

Takumu Nishihara (西原拓夢, Nishihara Takumu; born 17 July 1992) is a Japanese professional footballer who plays as a forward for Championship club Persiba Balikpapan.

== Career statistics ==
=== Club ===
As of 8 May 2026

| Club | Season | League | | | League Cup | | AFC cup | | Total | |
| Club | Season | Division | Apps | Goals | Apps | Goals | Apps | Goals | Apps | Goals |
|---|---|---|---|---|---|---|---|---|---|---|
| Ayeyawady United | 2016 | Myanmar National League | 12 | 9 | – | | 3 (Note: Appearances in the AFC Cup) | 0 | 15 | 9 |
| Nay Pyi Taw | 2017 | Myanmar National League | 7 | 2 | 1 | 0 | – | | 8 | 2 |
| Lao Toyota | 2018 | Lao Premier League | 8 | 3 | – | | – | | 8 | 3 |
| Khon Kaen United | 2019 | Thai League 3 | 14 | 6 | 1 | 3 | – | | 15 | 9 |
| Young Elephants | 2020 | Lao Premier League | 9 | 8 | 4 | 4 | – | | 13 | 12 |
| Tiffy Army FC | 2022 | Cambodian Premier League | 21 | 21 | 4 | 3 | – | | 25 | 24 |
| Visakha FC | 2023–24 | Cambodian Premier League | 10 | 3 | 8 | 8 | – | | 19 | 12 |
| Lija Athletic | 2023–24 | Maltese Challenge League | 6 | 2 | 0 | 0 | – | | 6 | 2 |
| Young Elephants | 2024–25 | Lao League 1 | 14 | 26 | 0 | 0 | – | | 14 | 26 |
| Persiba Balikpapan | 2025–26 | Championship | 27 | 12 | 0 | 0 | – | | 27 | 12 |
| Career total | | | 128 | 92 | 18 | 18 | 3 | 0 | 149 | 111 |

== Honours ==
=== Club ===
Lao Toyota

- Lao League 1: 2018

Khonkaen United

- Thai League 3: 2019

Young Elephants

- Lao FF Cup: 2020

Individual

- Lao FF Cup Player of the tournament: 2020
- Lao League 1 Top scorer: 2024–25
