= Sourasay Keosouvandeng =

Laotian footballer

Personal information
- Full name: Sourasay Keosouvandeng
- Date of birth: February 20, 1992 (age 34)
- Place of birth: Vientiane, Laos
- Height: 1.56 m (5 ft 1 1/2 in)
- Position: Goalkeeper

Team information
- Current team: Yotha
- Number: 1

Senior career*
Years	Team	Apps	(Gls)
2010–present	Yotha		

International career
2011–	Laos	2	(0)
- * Club domestic league appearances and goals

Sourasay Keosouvandeng (born 20 February 1992, in Vientiane) is a Laotian football player who currently plays for Yotha in the Lao League. He is also a member of the Laos national football team where he made his debut for them on February 16, 2011, in a 1–1 draw against Chinese Taipei in a 2012 AFC Challenge Cup qualification game.

== Honours ==
- Lao League: 2011
