= 2001 Lao League =

Lao League
- Season: 2001

Statistics for the 2001 season of the Lao League.

== Overview ==
Banks won the championship, which was arranged on a group stage. Two pools of six played each other with the top two qualifying for the semi-finals.

=== Group stage ===
Pool 1

Banks (Finished first in Group)
Interior Ministry (Finished second in Group)
Luang Prabang Province
Education Ministry
Army

Pool 2

Champassak Province (Finished first in Group)
Vientiane municipality (Finished first in Group)
Industry Ministry
Khammuan Province
Savannakhet Province

=== Semi-finals ===
Banks (Laos)	beat	(Laos) Vientiane Municipality FC

Ministry of the Interior FC (Laos)	beat	(Laos) Champassak Province FC

=== Third-place match ===
Champassak Province FC (Laos)	lost	(Laos) Vientiane Municipality FC

=== Final ===
Mar 22, 2001

Bank (Laos)	3-1	(Laos) Ministry of the Interior FC
