= 2000 Lao League =

- Season: 2000
- Champions: Vientiane Municipality FC

Statistics of Lao League in the 2000 season.

== Overview ==
Vientiane Municipality FC won the sixth national games, beating Champassak Province FC from the south of Laos. There is some debate as to whether this was the national championship. One source suggests that it was however, there is also evidence that National Bank, who played in the top division, won the National Trophy and that this is assumed to have been a cup competition and could have been the national title for the year.

=== Sixth National Games ===
The following teams took part in sixth National Games which may well have been the national championship for the year:

==== Institutional Teams ====
Banks
Industry Ministry
Social Welfare Ministry
Prime Ministers Office
Education Ministry
Interior Ministry
Public Health Ministry
Army
Information and Culture Ministry
Foreign Affairs Ministry

==== Provincial/City Teams ====
Vientiane
Xieng Khuang
Bolikhamsay
Sayaboury
Khammuan
Saravan
Luang Prabang
Sekong
Houaphan
Bokeo
Champassak
Savannakhet
Houaphan
Vientiane Municipality
