= 2018 Lao Premier League =

Lao Premier League
- Season: 2018

The 2018 Lao Premier League is the 29th season of the Lao Premier League. The season started on 24 February 2018.

== Teams ==
A total of 8 teams participated in the 2018 Lao League season, 1 promoted from the previous season of Lao Division 1 League. 6 teams withdrew from the league, including defending champions.

Locations of the 2018 Lao Premier League teams

=== Stadia ===
Note: Table lists in alphabetical order.

| Team | Stadium | Capacity |
|---|---|---|
| DK FC | Laos National Stadium | 15,000 |
| Luang Prabang United | Luang Prabang Stadium | 12,000 |
| Lao Police | New Laos National Stadium | 25,000 |
| Lao Toyota | New Laos National Stadium | 25,000 |
| Master 7 | New Laos National Stadium | 25,000 |
| Savan United | New Laos National Stadium | 25,000 |
| Young Elephant | National University of Laos Stadium | ? |
| Lao Army | New Laos National Stadium | 25,000 |

== League table ==
| Pos | Team | Pld | W | D | L | GF | GA | GD | Pts | Qualification or relegation |
|---|---|---|---|---|---|---|---|---|---|---|
| 1 | Lao Toyota | 14 | 11 | 1 | 2 | 47 | 11 | +36 | 34 | Qualification for the 2019 AFC Cup Group Stage and 2018 Mekong Club Championship |
| 2 | Lao Police | 14 | 8 | 1 | 5 | 24 | 16 | +8 | 25 | |
| 3 | Luang Prabang United | 14 | 6 | 4 | 4 | 18 | 18 | 0 | 22 | |
| 4 | Master 7 | 14 | 6 | 3 | 5 | 26 | 24 | +2 | 21 | |
| 5 | Savan United | 14 | 5 | 3 | 6 | 14 | 23 | −9 | 18 | |
| 6 | Young Elephant | 14 | 4 | 3 | 7 | 14 | 17 | −3 | 15 | |
| 7 | Lao Army | 14 | 2 | 5 | 7 | 12 | 28 | −16 | 11 | |
| 8 | DK | 14 | 2 | 4 | 8 | 12 | 30 | −18 | 10 | |

Source: FIFA Lao League
Rules for classification: 1) points; 2) goal difference; 3) number of goals scored.
