= 2002 Lao League =

Lao League
- Season: 2002

In the 2002 Lao League, MCTPC FC (Ministry of Communication, Transportation, Post and Construction) won the championship, with Vientiane Municipality runners up.
