= 1995 Lao League =

- Season: 1995
- Champions: Lao Army FC

The 1995 Lao League was the sixth season of top flight football in Laos. Pakse FC and Education Team FC won the championships. The tournament won by Pakse was apparently a tournament from which teams from Vientiane were excluded and Education Team won a separate tournament exclusively for teams from Vientiane.
