= Nguyễn Thanh Bình =

Nguyễn Thanh Bình may refer to:

- Nguyễn Thanh Bình (politician)
- Nguyễn Thanh Bình (footballer, born 1987)
- Nguyễn Thanh Bình (footballer, born 2000)
