= Phoutdavy Phommasane =

Laotian footballer

Personal information
- Full name: Phoutdavy Phommasane
- Date of birth: 2 February 1994 (age 32)
- Place of birth: Laos
- Height: 1.67 m (5 ft 6 in)
- Position: Midfielder

Team information
- Current team: Master 7
- Number: 10

Senior career*
Years	Team	Apps	(Gls)
2013-2015	Hoang Anh Attapeu		
2016–2020	Chanthabouly		
2022–	Master 7 FC		

International career
2014	Laos U23	3	(0)
2014–	Laos	11	(0)
- * Club domestic league appearances and goals

Phoutdavy Phommasane (born 2 February 1994) is a Laotian professional footballer who plays as a midfielder for Lao League 1 club Master 7 and the Laos national team.
