= 2006 Lao League =

Lao League
- Season: 2006

Statistics of Lao League in the 2006 season.

== Overview ==
Vientiane FC won the championship.
