= 2003 Lao League =

Lao League
- Season: 2003

Statistics for the 2003 season of the Lao League.

== Overview ==
MCTPC FC (Ministry of Communication, Transportation, Post and Construction), described in the source as Telecom and Transportation, won the championship.
