= 2007 Lao League =

Lao League
- Season: 2007

Statistics of Lao League in the 2007 season.

== Overview ==
Lao-American College FC won the championship.
