= 1994 Lao League =

- Season: 1994
- Champions: Lao Army FC

The 1994 Lao League was the fifth season of top flight football in Laos. Lao Army FC from Vientiane won the championship, their fifth championship and fifth in a row, the only time a team from Laos has achieved this feat as of 2014.
