= Ketsada Souksavanh =

Laotian football player (born 1992)

Personal information
- Full name: Ketsada Souksavanh
- Date of birth: 23 November 1992 (age 33)
- Place of birth: Laos
- Height: 1.70 m (5 ft 7 in)
- Position: Defender

Team information
- Current team: Master 7 FC

Youth career
- 2007: Lao Army FC

Senior career*
Years	Team	Apps	(Gls)
2008	Lao Army FC	9	(0)
2009–2011	Ezra FC	33	(0)
2011–2012	Nong Khai	31	(0)
2013	Thai Honda	10	(0)
2014–2017	SHB Champasak	14	(0)
2017	Super Power Samut Prakan	8	(0)
2018	Lao Toyota		
2020	Master 7 FC		
2022-	Master 7 FC		

International career^{‡}
2009–2015	Laos U23	15	(0)
2008–	Laos	35	(3)
- * Club domestic league appearances and goals as of 00:58, 10 October 2017 (UTC) ‡ National team caps and goals as of 10 June 2017

Ketsada Souksavanh (born 23 November 1992) is a Laotian football player who plays as a defender for the Laos national football team.

== Transfers ==
The Laotian transferred to Master 7 FC in 2022 Lao League 1

== International ==
=== International goals ===
Scores and results list Laos's goal tally first.

No	Date	Venue	Opponent	Score	Result	Competition
1.	26 October 2010	Vientiane, Laos	Timor-Leste	6–1	6–1	2010 AFF Championship qualification
2.	7 June 2013	Vientiane, Laos	Singapore	1–3	2–5	Friendly
3.	20 October 2014	Vientiane, Laos	Myanmar	1–2	1–2	2014 AFF Championship qualification
