= Khamphoumy Hanvilay =

Laotian footballer

Personal information
- Full name: Khamphoumy Hanvilay
- Date of birth: 2 December 1990 (age 35)
- Place of birth: Salavan, Laos
- Position: Centre-back

Team information
- Current team: Master 7

Senior career*
Years	Team	Apps	(Gls)
2012-2020	Lao Police Club		
2022	Ai Sport FC		
2022-	Master 7		

International career
2012–2018	Laos	20	(0)
- * Club domestic league appearances and goals

Khamphoumy Hanvilay (born 2 December 1990) is a Laotian football player who plays as a defender for Yotha and the Laos national football team.
