= 2008 Lao League =

Lao League
- Season: 2008

Statistics of Lao League in the 2008 season.

== Overview ==
Lao Army FC won the championship.
