= 1996 Lao League =

- Season: 1996
- Champions: Lao Army FC

The 1996 Lao League was the seventh season of top flight football in Laos. Lao Army FC won the championship, their sixth championship in the last seven seasons.
