= 1998 Lao League =

- Season: 1998
- Champions: Khammouan Province Team

The 1998 Lao League was the ninth recorded season of top flight football in Laos. Khammouan Province Team won the championship though it is unclear whether this was a genuine league championship. Public Health Ministry FC quit the league having been ever-present since at least 1982.
