= 1997 Lao League =

- Season: 1997
- Champions: Sayaboury FC, Lao Army FC

The 1997 Lao League was the eighth season of top flight football in Laos. Sayaboury FC, from Luang Prabang, and Lao Army FC, from Vientiane, won the championship2. The second championship in 1997, won by Lao Army, was the first official championship, played by 4 teams from Vientiane and 4 from the provinces. The championship won by Lao Army was their seventh league title in eight years.
