= Lao Airlines F.C. =

Lao Airlines FC
- Full name: Lao Airlines Football Club

Lao Airlines Football Club is a football club based Laos. They play in the Lao League, the top national football league in Laos.
