= 1992 Lao League =

- Season: 1992
- Champions: Lao Army FC

The 1992 Lao League was the third recorded season of top flight football in Laos. Lao Army FC won the championship, their third consecutive championship.
