= 1993 Lao League =

- Season: 1993
- Champions: Lao Army FC, Savannakhet FC

The 1993 Lao League was the fourth recorded season of top flight football in Laos. Savannakhet FC, from Thakhek, and Lao Army FC, from Vientiane, won the championships. The tournament won by Savannakhet was apparently a tournament from which teams from Vientiane were excluded and Lao Army won a separate tournament exclusively for teams from Vientiane.
