= 1991 Lao League =

- Season: 1991
- Champions: Lao Army FC

The 1991 Lao League was the second recorded season of top flight football in Laos. Lao Army FC won the championship, their second title, with Public Health Ministry finishing second, their best ever performance.
