= Odomsith Singlatsomboun =

Laotian footballer

Personal information
- Full name: Odomsith Singlatsomboun
- Date of birth: 10 May 1989 (age 37)
- Place of birth: Laos
- Height: 1.60 m (5 ft 3 in)
- Position: Defender

Team information
- Current team: Champasak
- Number: 7

Senior career*
Years	Team	Apps	(Gls)
2014	SHB Champasak F.C.	0	(0)
2022–	Champasak	1	(0)

International career^{‡}
2014	Laos	6	(0)
- * Club domestic league appearances and goals as of 12:24, 23 November 2014 (UTC) ‡ National team caps and goals as of 12:24, 10 May 2017 (UTC)

Odomsith Singlatsomboun (born 10 May 1989) is a Laotian professional footballer who plays as a defender for Champasak in the Lao League 1. He used to play for the Laos national football team.
