= 1990 Lao League =

- Season: 1990
- Champions: Lao Army FC

The 1990 Lao League was the first recorded season of top flight football in Laos, though the league appears to have been running in some form since at least 1982. Lao Army FC from Vientiane won the championship.
