= Zulkifli Syukur =

Indonesian footballer

Personal information
- Full name: Zulkifli Syukur
- Date of birth: 3 May 1984 (age 42)
- Place of birth: Makassar, Indonesia
- Height: 1.75 m (5 ft 9 in)
- Position: Right-back

Youth career
- PSM Makassar

Senior career*
Years	Team	Apps	(Gls)
2005–2006	Persim Maros	8	(0)
2006–2007	PKT Bontang	28	(0)
2007−2008	Persmin Minahasa	31	(1)
2008−2011	Arema Indonesia	59	(1)
2011−2012	Persib Bandung	30	(0)
2012−2015	Mitra Kukar	60	(2)
2016	Borneo	29	(0)
2017−2022	PSM Makassar	76	(1)
2019	→ Sriwijaya (loan)	14	(0)
2022–2023	Adhyaksa Farmel	5	(0)
Total		336	(5)

International career
2006−2007	Indonesia U23		
2010−2014	Indonesia	31	(0)

Managerial career
- 2022–2024: Adhyaksa Farmel F.C. (assistant)
- 2024–: Persela Lamongan (assistant)
- 2024–2025: Persela Lamongan (caretaker)
- 2025–: Indonesia U23 (assistant)
- 2025–: Indonesia (caretaker assistant)
- 2026: PSM Makassar (assistant)
- 2026–: Garudayaksa (assistant)
Medal record
Men's football
Representing Indonesia
AFF Championship
Runner-up	2010 Indonesia & Vietnam	Team
- * Club domestic league appearances and goals

Zulkifli Syukur (born 3 May 1984) is an Indonesian former footballer who plays as a right-back, who is currently serving as the technical director for Super League club PSM Makassar.

== Honours ==
Arema Indonesia

- Indonesia Super League: 2009–10
- Piala Indonesia runner-up: 2010

Mitra Kukar

- General Sudirman Cup: 2015

PSM Makassar

- Piala Indonesia: 2018–19

Indonesia

- AFF Championship runner-up: 2010
