= Kovanh Namthavixay =

Laotian footballer

Personal information
- Date of birth: 23 July 1987 (age 39)
- Place of birth: Vientiane, Laos
- Height: 1.70 m (5 ft 7 in)
- Position: Defender

Senior career*
Years	Team	Apps	(Gls)
2004–2010	Yotha		
2015–2017	Lao Army		

International career
2004–2013	Laos	28	(2)

Managerial career
- 2018–2019: Lao Army
- 2019: Laos (Assistant)
- 2020: Young Elephants
- 2021: Lao Army
- 2023–: Lao Army
- * Club domestic league appearances and goals

Kovanh Namthavixay (born 23 July 1987) is a Laotian football manager and former player, who currently serves as the head coach for Lao Army FC in the Lao League 1. As a player Namthavixay was a defender and represented his country in the Laos national football team.

== Career statistics ==
=== International ===
Appearances and goals by national team and year
National team	Year	Apps	Goals
Laos	2004	5	0
Laos	2005	–	
Laos	2006	–	
Laos	2007	2	0
Laos	2008	4	0
Laos	2009	–	
Laos	2010	5	1
Laos	2011	1	0
Laos	2012	9	1
Laos	2013	2	0
Total		28	2

Scores and results list Laos's goal tally first, score column indicates score after each Namthavixay goal.

List of international goals scored by Kovanh Namthavixay
No.	Date	Venue	Opponent	Score	Result	Competition
1	26 October 2010	New Laos National Stadium, Vientiane, Laos	Timor-Leste	1–1	6–1	2010 AFF Championship qualification
2	11 October 2012	Thuwunna Stadium, Yangon, Myanmar	Brunei	1–1	3–1	2012 AFF Championship qualification
