= Nguyễn Hồng Tiến =

Vietnamese footballer

Personal information
- Full name: Nguyễn Hồng Tiến
- Date of birth: July 6, 1985 (age 41)
- Place of birth: Nam Đàn, Nghệ An, Vietnam
- Height: 1.68 m (5 ft 6 in)
- Position: Defender

Youth career
- 1995–1998: Sông Lam Nghệ An

Senior career*
Years	Team	Apps	(Gls)
1999–2008	Sông Lam Nghệ An	315	(11)
2003	→ Hòa Phát Hà Nội (loan)	29	(3)
2008–2016	Hà Nội T&T	167	(5)

International career
2010–2016	Vietnam	4	(0)
- * Club domestic league appearances and goals

Nguyễn Hồng Tiến (born 6 July 1985) is a Vietnamese footballer who plays as a defender for V-League club Hà Nội T&T and the Vietnam national football team. He was known for his violent behavior against Lê Văn Sơn in the match between Hanoi T&T and HAGL. Nguyễn Hồng Tiến deliberately kicked Lê Văn Sơn in his face while this player was lying on the ground.
