= Ray Jónsson =

Filipino-Icelandic footballer and manager (born 1979)

Personal information
- Full name: Ray Anthony Pepito Jónsson
- Date of birth: 3 February 1979 (age 47)
- Place of birth: Liloan, Cebu, Philippines
- Height: 1.75 m (5 ft 9 in)
- Positions: Left-back; wide midfielder

Youth career
- –1997: Grindavik

Senior career*
Years	Team	Apps	(Gls)
1997–2013	Grindavík	202	(5)
1997–1998	→ GG (loan)	?	(?)
1999	→ Völsungur (loan)	?	(?)
2013–2014	Keflavík	16	(0)
2015	Global	2	(0)
2015–2017	Grindavík		

International career^{‡}
2001	Iceland U21	2	(0)
2010–2013	Philippines	31	(0)

Managerial career
- 2015–2017: Grindavík (player-coach)
- 2017–2020: Grindavík (women)
- 2022–2025: Reynir Sandgerði
- 2026–: Grindavík
Medal record
Men's football
Representing Philippines
AFC Challenge Cup
Bronze medal – third place	2012 Nepal
- * Club domestic league appearances and goals as of 28 September 2013 ‡ National team caps and goals as of 14:40, 15 November 2013 (UTC)

Ray Anthony Pepito Jónsson (born 3 February 1979) is a former footballer and current head coach of 1. deild karla club Grindavík. He previously played for Úrvalsdeild karla club Keflavík. In January 2015 he was signed by Global to reinforce the team for the upcoming United Football League season. A former Iceland under-21 international, he has since switched allegiance to the Philippines, making his debut in 2010. He plays mainly as a left-back but has also played as a wide midfielder and as a forward early in his career.

== Club career ==
Ray Anthony signed a new three-year contract for Grindavik in March 2010. He has played in 146 Úrvalsdeild matches as of September 2010, and also in some domestic and European Cup matches.

In 2015, Ray Anthony played for Global FC of the United Football League in the Philippines and later returned to Iceland to serve as a playing coach for Grindavik.

== International career ==
Ray Anthony's father is Icelandic and his mother is a Filipina making him eligible to represent either country at international level. In 2001, he played two games with the Icelandic under-21 team, but since he has not played for the senior national team, he is eligible to play for the Philippines. This is after FIFA removed the age limit on players changing national teams in June 2009. In September 2010 he was called up to play for the Philippines national team in the 2010 AFF Suzuki Cup qualification.

Ray Anthony was initially planning on going to Asia on holiday but was tipped about possibly trying out for the Philippines national team. He eventually got in touch with the people involved with the national team and he was able to join the team in time for the 2010 Long Teng Cup. He then made his full international debut in their final match against Macau on 12 October 2010, playing the full 90 minutes in a 5–0 win.

During the Suzuki Cup qualifiers, he played in all three matches and was instrumental in keeping two clean sheets against Timor-Leste and Cambodia. This helped the Philippines stay undefeated with one win and two draws and clinch qualification for the 2010 AFF Suzuki Cup. His good form would continue at the Suzuki Cup with the Philippines conceding only a single goal in the group stage, in the 1–1 draw with Singapore. Thus, the Philippines qualified for the knockout stage of the tournament for the first time ever. They faced Indonesia in the semi-finals and in the first-leg, the Philippines lost 1–0 with the goal coming from a mix up between Ray Anthony and goalkeeper Neil Etheridge. The Philippines eventually lost 2–0 on aggregate.

== Coaching career ==
=== Grindavík ===
When Ray Anthony returned to Iceland in 2015, he became coach for Grindavík, and also briefly simultaneously played for the club in the fourth division.

=== Grindavík (women's) ===
In 2017, Ray Anthony was appointed as head coach for the women's team of Grindavík. In his third season, he led the club to the 2. deild kvenna title and was promoted to 1. deild kvenna. He left the club in November 2020.

=== Reynir Sandgerði ===
After coaching Grindavík's women's team for three seasons, Ray Anthony coached the youth teams of Reynir Sandgerði.

In October 2022, following the relegation of the club's senior team to 3. deild karla, he was appointed as head coach.

== Personal life ==
Ray Anthony was born and raised in Liloan, Cebu before moving to Iceland when he was eight years old. His mother hails from Cebu, and Jónsson himself can speak fluent Cebuano. He has a younger brother named Michael, who is also a footballer and a former teammate at Grindavik.

Ray Anthony is married and has three children, two daughters and a son, as of November 2016.

== Honors ==
=== Player ===
Philippines

- AFC Challenge Cup third place: 2012

=== Manager ===
Grindavík (women's)

- 2. deild kvenna: 2020
