= Viengsavanh Sayyaboun =

Laotian footballer (born 1989)

Personal information
- Full name: Viengsavanh Sayyaboun
- Date of birth: 3 June 1989 (age 37)
- Place of birth: Vientiane, Laos
- Height: 1.72 m (5 ft 8 in)
- Position: Midfielder

Team information
- Current team: Master 7 (head coach)

Senior career*
Years	Team	Apps	(Gls)
2008–2011	Savannakhet F.C.		
2012–2020	Lao Army		

International career^{‡}
2008	Laos	13	(1)

Managerial career
- 2022: Lao Army
- 2023: Laos Women U20
- 2024–: Master 7
- * Club domestic league appearances and goals ‡ National team caps and goals as of 20 March 2016

Viengsavanh Sayyaboun (born 3 June 1989) is a Laotian footballer who plays for Lao Army. He has also appeared for the Laos national football team in 13 matches, including at the 2012 AFF Suzuki Cup.
