= Seng-athit Somvang =

Laotian footballer

Seng-Athit Somvang
Personal information
- Full name: Seng-Athit Somvang
- Date of birth: June 2, 1991 (age 35)
- Place of birth: Laos
- Height: 1.65 m (5 ft 5 in)
- Position: Goalkeeper

Team information
- Current team: Ai Sport FC (Head Coach Goalkeeper)

Youth career
- 2010–2013: Lao Police Club

Senior career*
Years	Team	Apps	(Gls)
2013–2020	Lao Police Club	18	(0)

International career^{‡}
2010	Laos	2	(0)

Managerial career
- 2022-: Ai Sport FC (Head Coach Goalkeeper)
- * Club domestic league appearances and goals as of June 07, 2014 ‡ National team caps and goals as of June 07, 2014

Seng-Athit Somvang (born 2 June 1991) is a Laotian football goalkeeper. He made his first appearance for the Laos national football team in 2010.
