= Khamla Pinkeo =

Laotian footballer

Personal information
- Full name: Khamla Pinkeo
- Date of birth: November 23, 1990 (age 35)
- Place of birth: Pakse, Champasak, Laos
- Height: 1.65 m (5 ft 5 in)
- Position: Defender

Team information
- Current team: Champasak ( Head Coach )

Senior career*
Years	Team	Apps	(Gls)
2012–2020	Lao Police Club	39	(1)

International career^{‡}
2010–2018	Laos	21	(0)

Managerial career
- 2022-: Champasak
- * Club domestic league appearances and goals as of June 07, 2014 ‡ National team caps and goals as of JANUARY 20, 2022

Khamla Pinkeo (born 23 November 1990) is a Laotian footballer. He made his first appearance for the Laos National Football Team in 2010. In 2022, he was selected to coach for Champasak in Lao League 1.
