= Nguyễn Thanh Bình (footballer, born 1987) =

Vietnamese footballer

Personal information
- Full name: Nguyễn Thanh Bình
- Date of birth: 11 August 1987 (age 39)
- Place of birth: Đà Nẵng, Vietnam
- Height: 1.85 m (6 ft 1 in)
- Position: Goalkeeper

Team information
- Current team: SHB Đà Nẵng (assistant coach)

Youth career
- 2005–2010: SHB Đà Nẵng

Senior career*
Years	Team	Apps	(Gls)
2010–2022	SHB Đà Nẵng	167	(0)
2024	SHB Đà Nẵng (player-assistant)	3	(0)

International career
2012–2017	Vietnam	9	(0)
- * Club domestic league appearances and goals as of 22 November 2024

Nguyễn Thanh Bình (born 11 August 1987) is a retired Vietnamese footballer who played as a goalkeeper. He currently serves as an assistant coach for V.League 1 club SHB Đà Nẵng. He capped 9 times for Vietnam national team and took part in the 2014 AFF Championship.

Born in Đà Nẵng, Thanh Bình spent his entire football career at his city's club SHB Đà Nẵng and was part of the team's core members during the 2012 V-League triumph.

== Honours ==
SHB Đà Nẵng

- V.League 1: 2012
- Vietnamese Super Cup: 2012
