= Keoviengphet Liththideth =

Laotian footballer

Personal information
- Full name: Keoviengphet Liththideth
- Date of birth: 30 November 1992 (age 33)
- Place of birth: Champasak, Laos
- Height: 1.64 m (5 ft 4 1/2 in)
- Position: Midfielder

Team information
- Current team: Master 7 FC
- Number: 8

Senior career*
Years	Team	Apps	(Gls)
2010-2015	Ezra	63	(2)
2016-2017	Lanexang United		
2018-2019	Lao Toyota		
2019	Master 7		
2020–2021	Young Elephants		(10)
2022–	Master 7	50	(27)

International career
2011–2012	Laos U23	5	(1)
2010–	Laos	24	(3)
- * Club domestic league appearances and goals

Keoviengphet Liththideth (born 30 November 1992) is a Laotian professional footballer who plays as a midfielder for Master 7 in the Lao League 1 and the Laos national team.

== International goals ==
Scores and results list Lao's goal tally first.

No.	Date	Venue	Opponent	Score	Result	Competition
1.	25 November 2012	Bukit Jalil National Stadium, Kuala Lumpur, Malaysia	Indonesia	2–1	2–2	2012 AFF Championship
2.	1 December 2012	Shah Alam Stadium, Shah Alam, Malaysia	Singapore	2–0	3–4	2012 AFF Championship
3.	14 November 2016	Sarawak Stadium, Kuching, Malaysia	Brunei	1–0	3–2	2016 AFC Solidarity Cup

== Individual ==
- AFF Young Player of the years (1): 2013
