= Bank F.C. =

Bank FC
- Full name: Bank Football Club
- Founded: 1994
- Dissolved: 2012

Bank Football Club was a football club based Laos. They last played in the Lao League, the top national football league in 2011, when they finished runners up to Lao Police Club. They did not participate in the 2012 season. In 2010 they competed under the name Bank of Lao. Prior to this they appear to have competed in the Lao League under the name Bank in 2003, 2004, 2005, 2006 and 2007. A team called Banks FC entered the Lao League in 2008.

== Kit manufacturers ==
Period	Name
2012	(Germany) Adidas

== Honours ==
- Lao Premier League
  - Winners (2): 2001, 2010
- Prime Minister's Cup
  - Winners (2): 2010, 2011
