= BIS FC =

Football club in Laos

BIS Football Club
- Full name: BIS Football Club
- Founded: 2025; 1 year ago
- Ground: New Laos National Stadium, Vientiane
- Capacity: 25,000
- Chairman: Alfredo Yao
- Head coach: Bounlap Khenkitisack
- League: Lao League 1
- 2025–26: Lao League 1, 9th of 10
- Website: website
Home colours	Away colours

BIS Football Club (Lao: ສະໂມສອນບານເຕະ ບີໄອເອສ), formely known as Master, is a Laotian professional football club based in Vientiane. It plays in the Lao League 1.

The club's women section took part in the AFC Women's Champions League.

== Players ==
As of 5 February 2025

Note: Flags indicate national team as defined under FIFA eligibility rules; some limited exceptions apply. Players may hold more than one non-FIFA nationality.

No.	Pos.	Nation	Player
2	DF	MEX	Hugo Zambrano
4	DF	LAO	Phetdavanh Somsanith
7	FW	CIV	Michael Archange
8	FW	LAO	Keoviengphet Liththideth
9	MF	LAO	Daopahud Khamkasompoo
10	MF	LAO	Phoutdavy Phommasane (Captain)
11	FW	LAO	Soukphachan Lueanthala
12	DF	LAO	Xaivanpheng Loyvanxay
13	MF	LAO	Bounthavy Sipasong
15	DF	LAO	Soukamphan Phommalyvong
17	MF	LAO	Sonesanith Phommachanh
18	GK	LAO	Chanthasone Siliamphone
19	MF	LAO	Nikko Anousone

No.	Pos.	Nation	Player
21	DF	LAO	Sen Malaythong
22	FW	TLS	Olagar Xavier
23	MF	LAO	Khamhuk Keothongdee
24	DF	LAO	Aphixay Thanakhanty
27	DF	LAO	Sonevilay Phetviengsy
29	DF	LAO	At Viengkham
30	FW	CIV	Augustin Akpa
47	DF	LAO	Ayou Athisone
77	MF	LAO	Phasao Sinonalath
81	GK	JPN	Jun Kochi
88	GK	LAO	Soukthavy Soundala
96	MF	LAO	Khampane Douangvilay

== Coaching staff ==
Position	Name
President	(Philippines) Alfredo Yao
CEO	(Philippines) Lucio Tan
Director of football	(Philippines) Mariano Araneta
Team manager	(Laos) Koudkeo Sonevichit
Head coach	(Laos) Bounlap Khenkitisack
Assistant coaches	(Laos) Onsy Vannaket (Laos) Thoukee Phoutsadavong (Laos) Soulisack Sibounhoung (Laos) Sayasack Vanisaveth (Laos) Phonesavanh Syhalath
Goalkeeper coach	(Laos) Sengphet Vongxayalath
Doctor	(Laos) Viladet Keophikhoun
Physiotherapist	(Laos) Khankeo Phiennouvong
Team admin	(Laos) Thipphaphone Sisouphanthong
Team staff	(Laos) Bounkeuth Sisouphanthong

== Coaching history ==
- (South Korea) Na Byung Soo (2018–2019)
- (Romania) Catalin Dinu (2020)
- (Laos) Chandalaphone Liepvixay (2022)
- (Thailand) Vootthivat Daengsamerkiat (2023)
- (Laos) Viengsavanh Sayyaboun (2024–2025)
- (Laos) Bounlap Khenkitisack (2026–present)

== Continental record ==
Season	Competition	Round	Club	Home	Away	Aggregate
2020	AFC Cup	Qualifying play-off round	(Cambodia) Svay Rieng	0–3	4–1	1–7
