= Lao-American College F.C. =

Lao-American College FC
- Full name: Lao-American College Football Club
- Dissolved: 2013

Lao-American College Football Club is a Laotian football club competing in the Lao League, the highest level of Laotian football. It is one of 10 professional football teams in the country, but was ranked 189 out of 199 internationally as of June 2008. It home stadium is Lao-American College FC Stadium.

== Honours ==
- Lao Premier League
  - Winners (1): 2007
