= Pinkeo 2010 Chanthabouly Pakse F.C. =

Laotian football club

Pinkeo 2010 Chanthabouly Pakse
- Full name: Pinkeo 2010 Chanthabouly Pakse Football Club
- Nickname: King of Chanthabouly
- Founded: 2013; 13 years ago, as Lao Toyota F.C. 2021; 5 years ago, as FC Chanthabuly; 2026; 0 years ago, as Pinkeo 2010 Chanthabouly Pakse F.C.
- Ground: Champasak Stadium, Champasak, Laos
- Capacity: 8,000
- Owner: Khemsath Philapandeth
- Head coach: Bounlap Khenkitisack
- League: Lao League 2
- 2026: Champasak League 2 ; 1st of 8 (promoted)
Home colours	Away colours

Pinkeo 2010 Chanthabouly Pakse Football Club (Lao: ສະໂມສອນບານເຕະ ປິ່ນແກ້ວ 2010 ຈັນທະບູລີ ປາກເຊ), previously known as Lao Toyota Football Club for sponsorship reasons, is a professional football club based in Vientiane, Laos, currently competing in the Lao League 2. The club has won 5 league titles and 1 Lao FF Cup.

== History ==
Team crest as Lao Toyota from 2013–2020.

=== Lao Toyota ===
The club was founded in 2013 as Lao Toyota Football Club by Toyota. The team debuted in the Vientiane Capital League 1 in 2013, where they finished third and earned promotion to the Lao Premier League, the first division in the Laos division. In 2015, Lao Toyota won its first domestic championship. This was followed by four successive championship victories from 2017 to 2020. In 2019, the club won its first domestic treble winning the league title and the 2019 Lao FF Cup.

Since 2015, the team has qualified for the AFC Cup every season. The best result that the team has achieved in this competition is fourth place in the group stage. On 24 February 2016, the club recorded its first ever win in their AFC Cup history in a 2–1 win over Indian club Bengalaru.

=== Chanthabouly ===
In 2021, the team adopted its current name, Football Club Chanthabouly.

== Domestic history ==
Season	Division	League								Lao FF Cup	Top goalscorer		Head coach
Season	Division	Pl.	W	D	L	GF	GA	P	Pos.	Lao FF Cup	Name	Goals	Head coach
2013	Vientiane Capital League 1	8	6	0	2	25	9	18	3rd	—			Somsack Keodara
2014	Lao Premier League	18	12	2	4	56	19	38	2nd	Runners-up	Kazuo Honma	29	Dave Booth
2015	Lao Premier League	20	15	3	2	63	21	48	1st	—	Kazuo Honma	17	Dave Booth
2016	Lao Premier League	26	22	1	3	85	11	67	2nd	—			Bounlap Khenkitisack
2017	Lao Premier League	14	12	1	1	46	10	37	1st	—	Kazuo Honma		Bounlap Khenkitisack
2018	Lao Premier League	14	11	1	2	47	11	34	1st	—			Jun Fukuda
2019	Lao Premier League	15	12	1	2	46	12	37	1st	Champions	Kazuo Honma	14	Jun Fukuda
2020	Lao Premier League	12	10	2	0	31	5	32	1st	Semi-final			Jun Fukuda
2021	Lao League 1	Season cancelled due to the COVID-19 pandemic								—			Prajak Weangsong
2023	Lao League 2	22	15	5	2	59	18	41	2nd	Runners-up			Ketsada Thongken

=== Continental history ===
As of match played 10 March 2020

Competition	Pld	W	D	L	GF	GA
AFC Cup	25	1	6	18	27	60
Mekong Club Championship	3	0	0	3	2	9
Total	28	1	6	21	29	69

Season	Competition	Round	Club	Home	Away	Aggregate
2015	AFC Cup	Group H	(Indonesia) Persib Bandung	0–0	0–1	4th
2015	AFC Cup	Group H	(Maldives) New Radiant	1–1	1–2	4th
2015	AFC Cup	Group H	(Myanmar) Ayeyawady United	2–2	3–4	4th
2015	Mekong Club Championship	First round	(Cambodia) Boeung Ket Angkor	0–2		3rd
2015	Mekong Club Championship	First round	(Myanmar) Yangon United	2–5		3rd
2016	AFC Cup	Group H	(India) Bengaluru	2–1	1–2	4th
2016	AFC Cup	Group H	(Malaysia) Johor Darul Ta'zim	1–4	0–3	4th
2016	AFC Cup	Group H	(Myanmar) Ayeyawady United	2–3	2–4	4th
2017	AFC Cup	Play-off round	(Cambodia) Boeung Ket Angkor	0–1	1–1	1–2
2017	Mekong Club Championship	Semi-final	(Vietnam) Khanh Hoa	0–2		
2018	AFC Cup	Play-off round	(Cambodia) Boeung Ket Angkor	0–1	3–3	3–4
2019	AFC Cup	Group H	(Indonesia) PSM Makassar	0–3	3–7	4th
2019	AFC Cup	Group H	(Philippines) Kaya Iloilo	1–1	1–5	4th
2019	AFC Cup	Group H	(Singapore) Home United	2–3	0–1	4th
2020	AFC Cup	Group F	(Myanmar) Yangon United	—N/a	2–3	4th
2020	AFC Cup	Group F	(Singapore) Hougang United	1–3	—N/a	4th
2020	AFC Cup	Group F	(Vietnam) Ho Chi Minh City	0–2	—N/a	4th
2021	AFC Cup	Preliminary round 2	(Brunei) Kasuka	—N/a		

== Honours ==
=== Domestic leagues ===
- Lao Premier League
  - Champion (5): 2015, 2017, 2018, 2019, 2020
  - Runners-up (2): 2014, 2016
- Lao FF Cup
  - Champion (1): 2019
  - Runners-up (1): 2014
- Lao League 2
  - Runners-up (1): 2023

== Sponsors ==
Sportswear	Front sponsor	Chest sponsor	Shoulder sponsor
Lao Toyota Service	Lao Toyota Service	Krungsri	Yamaha

== Technical staff ==
Role	Name
President	(Laos) Khemsath Philapandeth
Vice-president 1	(Laos) Yasuo Philapandeth
Vice-president 2	(Laos) Phettavanh Inthavong
Team manager	(Laos) Phokeo Philapandeth
Team manager 2	(Laos) Sonenalin Noydala
Head coach	Vacant
Assistant coach	Vacant
Assistant coach 2	(Laos) Ketsada Thongken
Goalkeeping coach	(Laos) Vilasack Vanthanoulath
Physio	(Laos) Senga loun Kietsavanh
Fitness & conditioning coach	(Laos) Padit Thammavong

== Manager history ==
Coaches by Years (2013–2020)

- (Laos) Somsack Keodala (2013)
- (England) Dave Booth (2014–2015)
- (Laos) Bounlap Khenkitisack (2016)
- (Laos) Valakone Phomphakdy (Interim caretaker for the AFC Cup) (2016)
- (Japan) Jun Fukuda (2017–2020)
- (Thailand) Prajak Weangsong (2021)

== Affiliated clubs ==
- (Japan) Shonan Bellmare (2022–present)
