= Vientiane F.C. =

Vientiane Capital F.C.
- Full name: Vientiane Capital Football Club
- Founded: 1990; 35 years ago
- Owner: Vientiane Football Federation
- League: Lao Premier League

Vientiane Capital Football Club was a Laotian professional football club based in Vientiane, that competed in the Lao Premier League, the top tier of Football in Laos until 2018.

== Honours ==
- Lao Premier League
  - Winners (2): 2005, 2006
- Prime Minister's Cup
  - Winners (1): 2004
