= Lao League 1 =

Association football league in Laos

Pepsi Lao League 1
- Founded: 1988; 38 years ago
- First season: 1990
- Country: Laos
- Confederation: AFC
- Number of clubs: 11
- Level on pyramid: 1
- Relegation to: None
- Domestic cup: Prime Minister's Cup
- International cups: ASEAN Club Championship; AFC Challenge League
- Current champions: Ezra (2nd title) (2025–26)
- Most championships: Lao Army (8 titles)
- Broadcasters: LAOFF TV; FIFA + (live streaming)
- Website: laoff.org.la
- Current: 2026–27 Lao League 1

The Lao League 1, also known as the Pepsi Lao League 1 for sponsorship reasons, is the highest league division of football in Laos.

== Teams ==
A total of 11 teams participated in the 2026–27 Lao League 1 season.

Note: Table lists in alphabetical order.

Team	Location	Stadium	Capacity	Previous season
Army	Vientiane	Army Stadium Km5	1,500	Lao League 1 (5th)
BIS	Vientiane	New Laos National Stadium (outside field)	500	Lao League 1 (9th)
Champasak HALG Avenir	Champasak Province	Champasak Stadium	8,000	Lao League 1 (4th)
Ezra	Vientiane	New Laos National Stadium (outside field)	500	Lao League 1 (1st)
Chanthabouly Pinkeo Pakse	Champasak Province	Champasak Stadium	8,000	Lao League 1 (1)
Luang Prabang FC	Luang Prabang Province	Luang Prabang Stadium	7,000	Lao League 1 (7th)
Mazda GB	Vientiane	New Laos National Stadium (outside field)	500	Lao League 1 (3rd)
Namtha United	Luang Namtha Province	Luang Namtha Province Stadium	1,000	Lao League 1 (8th)
Oudomxay Entremets	Oudomxay Province	Oudomxay Province Stadium	10,000	Lao League 1 (1st)
Salavan United	Salavan Province	Salavan Province Stadium	1,000	Lao League 1 (6th)
Savannakhet	Savannakhet Province	Savannakhet Stadium	10,000	Lao League 1 (10th)

== Winners ==
Championship list:

Years	Champions
1990	Lao Army (1)
1991	Lao Army (2)
1992	Lao Army (3)
1993	Savannakhet FC (1) / Lao Army (4)
1994	Lao Army (5)
1995	Pakse (1) / Education Team (1)
1996	Lao Army (6)
1997	Sayaboury (1) / Lao Army (7)
1998	Khammouan Province Team (1)
1999	Unknown
2000	Vientiane Municipality (1)
2001	Lao Bank (1)
2002	Ministry of Public Works and Transport (1)
2003	Ministry of Public Works and Transport (2)
2004	Ministry of Public Works and Transport (3)
2005	Vientiane FC (1)
2006	Vientiane FC (2)
2007	Lao-American College (1)
2008	Lao Army (8)
2009	Not held
2010	Lao Bank (2)
2011	Yotha (4)
2012	Lao Police Club (1)
2013	SHB Champassak (1)
2014	Hoang Anh Attapeu (1)
2015	Lao Toyota (1)
2016	Lanexang United (1)
2017	Lao Toyota (2)
2018	Lao Toyota (3)
2019	Lao Toyota (4)
2020	Lao Toyota (5)
2021	Abandoned due to Covid-19
2022	Young Elephants (1)
2023	Young Elephants (2)
2024–25	Ezra (1)
2025–26	Ezra (2)

Note

- * = The Vientiane teams were excluded in 1993 and 1995. The second championship in 1997 was the first official championship, and included 4 teams from Vientiane and 4 from the provinces.

=== Titles by club ===
Club	Winners	Winning Seasons
Lao Army	8	1990, 1991, 1992, 1993, 1994, 1996, 1997, 2008
Chanthabouly (previously Lao Toyota)	5	2015, 2017, 2018, 2019, 2020
Yotha	4	2002, 2003, 2004, 2011
Vientiane FC	2	2005, 2006
Lao Bank	2	2001, 2010
Young Elephants	2	2022, 2023
Ezra	2	2024–25, 2025–26
Savannakhet	1	1993
Pakse	1	1995
Education Team	1	1995
Khammouan Province Team	1	1998
Vientiane Municipality	1	2000
Lao Bank	1	2001
Lao-American College	1	2007
Lao Police Club	1	2012
SHB Champasak	1	2013
Hoang Anh Attapeu	1	2014
Lanexang United	1	2016

== Top scorers ==
Season	Player	Club	Goal
2013	(Laos) Sitthideth Khanthavong	Lao Toyota	?
2014	(Japan) Kazuo Homma	Lao Toyota	29
2015	(Japan) Kazuo Homma	Lao Toyota	17
2016	(Liberia) Abu Kamara	Champa	19
2017	(Japan) Kazuo Homma	Lao Toyota	23
2018	(Japan) Kazuo Homma	Lao Toyota	21
2019	(Japan) Kazuo Homma	Lao Toyota	14
2020	(Brazil) Laércio Carreirinha (Laos) Keoviengphet Liththideth	Lao Toyota; Young Elephants	12
2022	(Laos) Keoviengphet Liththideth	Master 7	15
2023	(Brazil) Rafinha	Master 7	18
2024–25	(Japan) Takumu Nishihara	Young Elephants	26
2025–26	(Japan) Koki Narita	Ezra	22
