= Lao Army F.C. =

Lao Army
- Full name: Lao Army Association Football Club
- Founded: 2002; 24 years ago
- Ground: Army Stadium KM5
- Capacity: 1,000
- Owner: Lao People's Armed Forces
- Chairman: Lt. Gen Bounthavy Pathammavong
- Head coach: Kovanh Namthavixay
- League: Lao League 1
- 2025–26: Lao League 1, 5th of 10
Home colours	Away colours

Lao Army Association Football Club is a football section of the Lao People's Armed Forces, based in Vientiane. It plays in the Lao League 1, the top tier football league in Laos. The club have won a record of 8 league titles.

== Players (2024) ==
Note: Flags indicate national team as defined under FIFA eligibility rules; some limited exceptions apply. Players may hold more than one non-FIFA nationality.

No.	Pos.	Nation	Player
2	DF	LAO	Vanhkod Yangchaluen
4	DF	LAO	Somphavanh Inthavongsa
5	DF	LAO	Bounheng Douangdy
6	DF	LAO	Phimmasone Champathong
7	MF	LAO	Souksavanh Somsanith
8	FW	LAO	Souksavanh Xayalin
9	FW	LAO	Nilan Luangsisombut
10	MF	LAO	Sisawad Dalavong
11	DF	LAO	Inthavong Luangsalath
12	MF	LAO	Thongxay Sihalath
17	MF	LAO	Suea Phouvongvichit
18	GK	LAO	Keo-Oudone Souvannasangso

No.	Pos.	Nation	Player
19	MF	LAO	Keobounkham Buaphun
20	GK	LAO	Inthanon Chanthalasy
22	DF	LAO	Xouxana Sihalath
23	MF	LAO	Phouthone Innalay (captain)
24	DF	LAO	Tiengkham Bounyasaysy
25	MF	LAO	Phetsavanh Bounsoulinh
26	FW	LAO	Tee Sihalath
27	DF	LAO	Khanthaviphone Somphonenalat
29	FW	LAO	Vatsana Vongsamorlaphoum
33	MF	LAO	Sinouane Xamounty
34	MF	LAO	Jo E Sandara
36	FW	LAO	Nalin Luangsisombu

== Coaching staff ==
Position	Staff
Head coach	(Laos) Kovanh Namthavixay
Assistant coach	(Laos) Oth Phastnovanh
Goalkeeper coach	(Laos) Phimmasone Xaysongkham
Doctor	(Laos) Khamphasit Vanhnabouathong (Laos) Phongsavanh Oulavong
Team manager	(Laos) Thongphanh Phanthaya
Kit manager	(Laos) Keovixien Keovilay

== Honours ==
=== League ===
- Lao League
  - Champions (8):1990, 1991, 1992, 1993, 1994, 1996, 1997, 2008
- Lao Division 1 League
  - Champions (1): 2017
- Prime Minister's Cup
  - Winners (1): 2013
