= Yotha F.C. =

Yotha FC
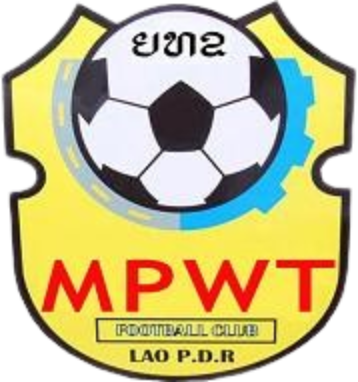
- Full name: Yothatikan Football Club
- Nickname: The Tigers
- Founded: 1997
- Dissolved: 2015

Yotha Football Club was a football club from Vientiane, Laos. Founded in 1997, the club was formerly known as MCTPC FC (Ministry of Communication, Transportation, Post and Construction), before changing their name to MPWT FC (Ministry of Public Works and Transport) in 2008. The club changed their name again to Yotha FC for the 2012 season. The club has won 3 championships of the Lao League in 2002, 2003 and 2011 and the Prime Minister's Cup in 2003 and 2007.

== Continental record ==
Season	Competition	Round	Club	Home	Away	Aggregate
2003	ASEAN Club Championship	Group A	(Vietnam) Hoàng Anh Gia Lai	2–1		2nd
2003	ASEAN Club Championship	Group A	(Indonesia) Persita Tangerang	1–5		2nd

== Invitational tournament record ==
Season	Competition	Round	Club	Home	Away	Aggregate
2012	Singapore Cup	Preliminary Round	(Japan) Albirex Niigata (S)	1–0		

== Achievements ==
- Lao League: 3
  - 2002, 2003 (both as MCTPC FC), 2011 (as MPWT FC).
- Prime Minister's Cup: 2
  - 2003 (as MCTPC FC), 2007 (as MPWT FC).^{Note 1}
- Lao National Games: 1
  - 2008 (as MPWT FC)

Note 1: RSSSF records their 2007 cup win under the name MPWT FC, but maintains their league performance under the name MCTPC FC. Both the 2008 National Games title and the 2008 league table are recorded under MPWT FC.

== Managers ==
- (Laos) Bounlap Khenkitisak (1997–2009)
- (Laos) Somsack Keodara (2010–2013)
