= Lao Police Club =

- Ground: New Laos National Stadium, Vientiane
- Capacity: 25,000
- Chairman: Lao Police

Lao Police Club is a football club based in Vientiane, Laos. They were champions of the Lao League in 2012.

== Invitational tournament record ==
Season	Competition	Round	Club	Home	Away	Aggregate
2013	Singapore Cup	Preliminary Round	(Brunei) DPMM FC	4–0		
2015	Singapore Cup	Preliminary Round	(Singapore) Geylang International	2–1		

== Honours ==
- Lao Premier League
  - Winners (1): 2012
- Lao FF Cup:
  - Winners(1): 2014
