= 2026–27 Lao League 1 =

Pepsi Lao League 1
- Season: 2026–27
- Dates: 10 October 2026 – 21 March 2027
- Matches: 35
- Goals: 110 (3.14 per match)
- Top goalscorer: Bounphachan Bounkong; Takato Sakai (8 goals)
- Biggest home win: Luang Prabang 8–0 Oudomxay Entremets (17 October 2026)
- Biggest away win: BIS 0–7 Ezra (24 October 2026)
- Highest scoring: Luang Prabang 8–0 Oudomxay Entremets (17 October 2026)
- Longest winning run: Mazda GB (6 games)
- Longest unbeaten run: Mazda GB (7 games)
- Longest winless run: Lao Army (7 games)
- Longest losing run: Oudomxay Entremets (6 games)
- Highest attendance: 3,568; Salavan United 2–0 Luang Prabang (11 October 2026)
- All statistics correct as of 22 November 2026.

The 2026–27 Lao League 1, also known as the 2026–27 Pepsi Lao League 1 for sponsorship reasons, is the 37th season of the Lao League 1, the top Laos professional league for association football clubs since its establishment in 1988. The season is scheduled to begin on 10 October 2026 and will conclude on 21 March 2027.

Ezra entered the season as the two-time defending champions, having secured their second consecutive league title and 4th overall Laos top-flight football title the previous season.

== Team changes ==
The 2026–27 season will have 11 teams participating – nine teams from the previous season and two newcomer teams. Last season's second team Young Elephants will not participate this season for unspecified reasons.

=== Newcomer teams ===
- Pinkeo 2010 Chanthabouly Pakse – the team is the merger of two Lao League 2 teams Chanthabouly and Pinkeo 2010.
- Oudomxay Entremets – the club from Oudomxay Province was founded in 2026 by Japan Entremets.

=== Name changes ===
Several clubs have rebranded or changed their logos for the 2026–27 season:

- BIS Master was renamed BIS Football Club after team ownership has been returned with Master.
- Champasak Avenir was renamed Champasak HAGL Avenir, with Hoang Anh Gia Lai Group officially signed a strategic partnership agreement for a duration of 3 years.
- Savannakhet was renamed Savannakhet Zelos, with ZELOS Sports Management had acquired this team and officially signed a partnership.

== Teams ==
=== Stadiums and locations ===
Locations of teams in the 2025–26 Lao League 1

Team	Location	Stadium	Capacity
Army	Vientiane	Army Stadium Km5	1,500
BIS	Vientiane	New Laos National Stadium (outside field)	500
Champasak HAGL Avenir	Pakse	Champasak Stadium	8,000
Ezra	Vientiane	New Laos National Stadium (outside field)	500
Luang Prabang	Luang Prabang	Luang Prabang Stadium	7,000
Mazda GB	Vientiane	New Laos National Stadium (outside field)	500
Namtha United	Luang Namtha	Luang Namtha Province Stadium	1,000
Oudomxay Entremets	Muang Xay	Oudomxay Province Stadium	8,000
Pinkeo 2010 Chanthabouly Pakse	Pakse	Champasak Stadium	8,000
Salavan United	Salavan	Salavan Province Stadium	3,000
Savannakhet Zelos	Savannakhet	Savannakhet Stadium	10,000

== Personnel and sponsoring ==
Team	Manager	Captain	Kit manufacturer	Kit sponsor(s)	
Team	Manager	Captain	Kit manufacturer	Main	Other(s)
Army	(Laos) Viengsavanh Sayyaboun	(Laos) Sisavat Dalavong	(Laos) PAPON Sportswear	None	List: Front: None; Back: None; Sleeves: None; Shorts: None
BIS	(Laos) Xayyasak Vanisaveth	(Laos) Phouthone Innalay	(Laos) Life Football	BIS	List: Front: None; Back: none; Sleeves: None; Shorts: None
Champasak HAGL Avenir	(South Korea) Song-Chon Jong	(South Korea) Jang Min	(Vietnam) MOTIVE Sportswear	Hoang Anh Gia Lai Group	List: Front: Birdy Friends; Back: DJ Sports Group, On Finity; Sleeves: Lava Water, Dao Water; Shorts: None
Ezra	(Laos) Chandalaphone Liepvisay	(Laos) Anantaza Siphongphan	(Laos) Life Football	SkyVision	List: Front: Broker Smile, ThaiNamthip, Coca-Cola; Back: Eternal Coffee; Sleeves: Chue Chin Hua, Chakawan; Shorts: None
Luang Prabang	(Laos) Kola Oundala	(Laos) Kaharn Phetsivilay	(Laos) PAPON Sportswear	Électricité du Laos	List: Front: None; Back: Mineral Water, Luang Prabang Elephant Camp, Luang Prabang Car Rental, Nam Ou Riverside & Resort; Sleeves: Luang Prabang Inn Hotel Group, ProBiz Group; Shorts: None
Mazda GB	(Laos) Oley Bousaart	(Japan) Yogo Ichinayaki	(Laos) PAPON Sportswear	Mazda	List: Front: None; Back: Nikson Mining Development, VIP Fitness Club, Vari Water; Sleeves: Kimberley Apartment, Nar Labs Asia, GB Logistics; Shorts: None
Namtha United	(Laos) Amphaivanh Chanthalavong	(Laos) Sengphachan Bounthisanh	(Laos) Evo Store	Coca-Cola	List: Front: iCAR; Back: None; Sleeves: None; Shorts: None
Oudomxay Entremets	(Laos) Somlith Latsany		(Laos) Zz-Sports	Entremets	List: Front: iCAR; Back: None; Sleeves: None; Shorts: None
Pinkeo 2010 Chanthabouly Pakse	(Laos) Bounlap Khenkitisack	(Japan) Ryu Hamano	(Laos) Life Football	Lao Toyota Southern	List: Front: Bridgestone, Yamaha; Back: KP Company Limited, Pele Fitness Club; Sleeves: Kubota, KP Logistics; Shorts: None
Salavan United	(Laos) Phoutpasong Sengdalavong	(Laos) Soukaphone Vongchiengkham	(Thailand) Ego Sport	Phoumin Construction	List: Front: None; Back: None; Sleeves: Phoumin Construction; Shorts: None
Savannakhet Zelos	(Laos) Souk Vongviman	(Japan) Taku Hishida	(Laos) Began Sport	The Park Vientiane	List: Front: None; Back: Rikyu Matcha; Sleeves: Sky Connect International; Shorts: None

== Foreign players ==
Since the previous season, LFF adopted a registration system based on three distinct "routes", allowing teams to specialize their recruitment.

1) AFC-Only Route

- Clubs may register up to 10 foreign players, all of whom must be nationals of AFC member associations. A maximum of 7 foreign players may be fielded in a match. Clubs must provide a bank statement showing at least LAK 3 billion (approximately US$139,000), unless they hold an AFC Club Licensing certification for the season.

2) Intercontinental Route

- Clubs may register up to 6 foreign players, consisting of 4 players from outside the AFC, one AFC player, and one ASEAN player. Up to 5 foreign players may be fielded in a match. No bank statement is required.

3) ASEAN-Only Route

- Clubs may register up to 6 foreign players, all of whom must be nationals of ASEAN member associations. All 6 may be fielded in a match. No bank statement is required.

Club	Player 1	Player 2	Player 3	Player 4	Player 5	Player 6	Player 7	Player 8	Player 9	Player 10	Former / Unregistered Players
Army											
BIS	(Republic of the Congo) Tony Ponyo Lupunga	(France) Jilo Niamké	(France) Ronandcha Dejean	(Jamaica) Javon Turner	(Japan) Shogo Hotta	(Myanmar) Nyein Paing Htet					
Champasak HAGL Avenir	(Japan) Hideyuki Watanabe	(South Korea) Lee Gi-hun	(South Korea) Um Ji-hwan	(South Korea) Jang Min	(South Korea) Kim Jae-ha	(South Korea) Kim Kwan-hee	(South Korea) Kim Chae-hyun	(Vietnam) Nguyễn Bảo Đức	(Vietnam) Tô Minh Lộc		
Ezra	(Japan) Reo Nakamura	(Japan) Reiya Mutsuda	(Japan) Kazuha Sudo	(Japan) Koki Narita	(Japan) Yunosuke Sugiura	(South Korea) Kim Min-jun	(South Korea) Yoon Dabin				
Luang Prabang EDL	(Brazil) John Caio	(Japan) Masaya Tahara	(Japan) Sho Komine	(Japan) Shotaro Ishii	(Liberia) Emmanuel Jugbe Doe						
Mazda Laos GB	(Japan) Koki Miyamoto	(Japan) Ren Yoshioka	(Japan) Takato Sakai	(Japan) Ryoki Imaizumi	(Japan) Tsubasa Watanabe	(Japan) Yogo Ichinayaki	(Japan) Toshinari Sato				
Namtha United	(Egypt) Saad El Mokanen	(Japan) Hiroya Fujibayashi	(Japan) Masaki Honda	(Japan) Tomonari Miyazaki	(Japan) Kenshu Alao						
Oudomxay Entremets	(Japan) Ayumu Yamaguchi	(Japan) Kon Kawahara	(Japan) Ren Aizawa	(Japan) Ibuki Aono	(Japan) Jinta Tsukui	(Thailand) Theerapat Arsa					
Pinkeo 2010 Chanthabouly Pakse	(Japan) Ryu Hamano	(Japan) Ryu Kobayashi	(Japan) Ryuma Matsumoto	(Japan) Toshiki Morimoto	(Japan) Toshiki Okamato	(Japan) Yuma Ishiwata					
Salavan United	(France) Arnaud Rollin	(Japan) Soichi Kinoshita	(Japan) Rintaro Tsuchitani	(Nigeria) Tony Palito Ojeabulu	(Thailand) Thaweesak Kitraksa	(Thailand) Ratsin Bamrungphakdee					(Japan) Sho Komine (France) Stéphane Blanc
Savannakhet Zelos	(Australia) Anthony Mylonas	(Japan) Takaya Sugasawa	(Japan) Shion Mitarai	(Japan) Ryosuke Honda	(Japan) Taku Hishida	(Japan) Ginga Shiga	(Japan) Ryusei Seike	(Japan) Keita Sato	(Japan) Shota Inoue	(Japan) Ryusei Kodaira	(Bangladesh) Shuki Itofusa (Japan) Nasu Okamoto

Notes:

1. Players who were still under contract but de-registered due to various reasons (such as injury).

== League table ==
Pos	Team	Pld	W	D	L	GF	GA	GD	Pts	Qualification or relegation
1	Mazda GB	7	6	1	0	18	2	+16	19	Qualification for the AFC Challenge League preliminary round and ASEAN Club Championship qualifying play-offs
2	Ezra	6	5	1	0	22	5	+17	16	
3	Salavan United	6	5	1	0	16	4	+12	16	
4	Luang Prabang	6	4	1	1	18	5	+13	13	
5	Champasak HAGL Avenir	6	4	0	2	9	5	+4	12	
6	Savannakhet Zelos	7	2	3	2	11	10	+1	9	
7	Namtha United	7	2	1	4	8	14	−6	7	
8	Pinkeo 2010 Chanthabouly Pakse	6	1	0	5	4	16	−12	3	
9	Lao Army	7	0	2	5	0	11	−11	2	
10	BIS	6	0	2	4	4	21	−17	2	
11	Oudomxay Entremets	6	0	0	6	0	17	−17	0	

Updated to match(es) played on 22 November 2026. Source: FIFA Lao League
Rules for classification: 1) Points; 2) Goal difference; 3) Goals scored.

=== Positions by round ===
The table lists the positions of teams after each week of matches. In order to preserve chronological evolvements, any postponed matches are not included in the round at which they were originally scheduled, but added to the full round they were played immediately afterwards. For example, if a match is scheduled for matchday 13, but then postponed and played between days 16 and 17, it will be added to the standings for day 16.

Team ╲ Round	1	2	3	4	5	6	7	8	9	10	11	12	13	14	15	16	17	18	19	20	21	22
Lao Army	8	10	8	9	8	8	9															
BIS	11	8	10	8	9	9	10															
Champasak HAGL Avenir	1	6	6	7	7	6	5															
Ezra	2	2	1	1	3	3	2															
Luang Prabang	9	5	5	4	4	4	4															
Mazda GB	5	3	3	3	2	2	1															
Namtha United	4	7	7	6	6	7	7															
Oudomxay Entremets	10	11	11	11	11	11	11															
Pinkeo 2010 Chanthabouly Pakse	7	9	9	10	10	10	8															
Salavan United	3	1	2	2	1	1	3															
Savannakhet Zelos	6	4	4	5	5	5	6															

Champion and qualification to AFC Challenge League preliminary round and ASEAN Club Championship qualifying play-offs

Source: Lao League

=== Results by match played ===
Team ╲ Round	1	2	3	4	5	6	7	8	9	10	11	12	13	14	15	16	17	18	19	20	21	22
Lao Army	L	L	L	L	D	D	L	N														
BIS	L	N	L	D	L	L	L															
Champasak HAGL Avenir	W	L	L	N	W	W	W															
Ezra	W	W	W	D	N	W	W															
Luang Prabang	L	W	W	W	D	N	W															
Mazda GB	D	W	W	W	W	W	W				N											
Namtha United	W	L	L	W	D	L	L		N													
Oudomxay Entremets	L	L	N	L	L	L	L															
Pinkeo 2010 Chanthabouly Pakse	N	L	L	L	L	L	W															
Salavan United	W	W	W	D	W	W	N															
Savannakhet Zelos	D	W	W	D	D	L	L			N												

Source: Lao League
N = No match; W = Win; D = Draw; L = Lose

== Results ==
=== Results table ===
Home \ Away	ARM	BIS	CPS	EZR	LPB	MGB	NTU	ODX	PCP	SLV	SVK
Lao Army		0–0					0–1			0–1	0–0
BIS				0–7		1–6					2–2
Champasak HAGL Avenir		3–0			1–2		2–0				
Ezra	3–0										3–2
Luang Prabang	4–0						1–1	8–0	3–1		
Mazda GB	2–0		2–0				4–1				
Namtha United								2–0		0–3	3–4
Oudomxay Entremets			0–1	0–2		0–3			0–1		
Pinkeo 2010 Chanthabouly Pakse				1–5		0–1				1–5	
Salavan United		3–1		2–2	2–0						
Savannakhet			1–2			0–0			2–0		

Updated to match(es) played on 22 November 2026. Source: Lao League 1 2026–27
Legend: Blue = home team win; Yellow = draw; Red = away team win.
For upcoming matches, an "a" indicates there is an article about the rivalry between the two participants.

== Season statistics ==
=== Top Goalscorers ===
As of 22 November 2026.

Rank	Player	Club	Goals
1	(Laos) Bounphachan Bounkong	Luang Prabang	8
1	(Japan) Takato Sakai	Mazda GB	8
3	(Japan) Koki Narita	Ezra	6
4	(Laos) Peter Phanthavong	Ezra	5
4	(Thailand) Thaweesak Kitraksa	Salavan United	5
6	(Laos) Phoutthalak Thongsanith	Ezra	4
7	(South Korea) Kim Jae-ha	Champasak HAGL Avenir	3
7	(Liberia) Emmanuel Jugbe Doe	Luang Prabang	3
7	(Brazil) John Caio Camargo	Luang Prabang	3
7	(Laos) Kadam Koneyer	Salavan United	3
7	(Laos) Phisith Aor	Savannakhet Zelos	3
7	(Laos) Phoutthasay Khochalern	Savannakhet Zelos	3

=== Hat-trick ===
Player	For	Against	Result	Date
(Laos) Bounphachan Bounkong	Luang Prabang	Oudomxay Entremets	8–0 (H)	17 October 2026
(Laos) Phisith Aor	Savannakhet Zelos	Namtha United	4–3 (A)	17 October 2026
(Laos) Peeter Phanthavong⁴	Ezra	BIS	7–0 (H)	24 October 2026
(Japan) Takato Sakai⁴	Mazda GB	BIS	6–1 (A)	22 November 2026

=== Clean sheets ===
As of 22 November 2026.

Rank	Player	Club	Clean sheets
1	(Laos) Solasak Thilavong	Mazda GB	4
2	(Japan) Hideyuki Watanabe	Champasak HAGL Avenir	3
2	(Laos) Kop Lokphathip	Ezra	3
2	(Australia) Anthony Mylonas	Savannakhet Zelos	3
5	(Laos) Soukthavy Soundala	Salavan United	2
5	(Japan) Shotaro Ishii	Luang Prabang	2
7	Eight players		1

== Attendances ==
=== Overall ===
Please provide the information.

== See also ==
- 2026 Lao League 2
- 2026–27 Prime Minister's Cup
