= 2016 Lao Premier League =

Lao League
- Season: 2016
- Champions: Lanexang United
- Matches: 26
- Goals: 726 (27.92 per match)
- Top goalscorer: (Liberia) Abu Kamara (19 goals)
- Biggest home win: Lanexang United 9–1 Ezra (3 April 2016)
- Biggest away win: Saythany City 0–8 Savan United (30 April 2016)
- Highest scoring: Lanexang United 9–1 Ezra (3 April 2016); Saythany City F.C. (7 May 2016)
- Longest winning run: 19 matches Lanexang United
- Longest unbeaten run: 8 matches CSC Champa
- Longest winless run: 9 matches Champasak United
- Longest losing run: 6 matches Saythany City
- Highest attendance: 2,000; Lao Toyota 0–1 Lanexang United (26 June 2016)
- All statistics correct as of 12 June 2016.

The 2016 Lao League is the 27th season of the Lao League, the top Laotian professional league for association football clubs, since its establishment in 1990. The season began on 26 March 2016, and is scheduled to conclude in late 2016.

Lao Toyota came into the season as defending champions of the 2015 season. Lao Army, National University of Laos, VSV United and Saythany City were promoted from the lower leagues.

== Teams ==
A total of 14 teams will participate in the 2016 Lao League season, ten from the previous season and four promoted teams. No teams were relegated after the 2015 season due to league expansion as Lao Army, National University of Laos, Saythany City and VSV United were promoted from the lower leagues. Hoang Anh Attapeu, who finished 5th in 2015, withdrew from the league while SHB Vientiane were renamed as CSC Champa and Savan were renamed as Savan United.

=== Stadia ===
Note: Table lists in alphabetical order.

| Team | Stadium | Capacity |
|---|---|---|
| Champasak United | Champasak Stadium | 12,000 |
| CSC Champa | Champasak Stadium | 12,000 |
| Eastern Star | New Laos National Stadium | 25,000 |
| Electricite du Laos | Lanexang Stadium | 4,000 |
| Ezra | Lanexang Stadium | 4,000 |
| Lanexang United | Lanexang Stadium | 4,000 |
| Lao Army | Army Stadium KM5 | 1,000 |
| Lao Police | New Laos National Stadium | 25,000 |
| Lao Toyota | Laos National Stadium | 15,000 |
| National University of Laos | National University of Laos Stadium | 5,000 |
| Savan United | Savannakhet Stadium | 15,000 |
| Saythany City | New Laos National Stadium | 25,000 |
| VSV United | Lanexang Stadium | 4,000 |
| Young Elephant | New Laos National Stadium | 25,000 |

== League table ==
| Pos | Team | Pld | W | D | L | GF | GA | GD | Pts | Qualification |
|---|---|---|---|---|---|---|---|---|---|---|
| 1 | Lanexang United | 26 | 24 | 1 | 1 | 92 | 14 | +78 | 73 | Qualification to Mekong Club Championship AFC Cup group stage |
| 2 | Lao Toyota | 26 | 22 | 1 | 3 | 85 | 11 | +74 | 67 | Qualification to AFC Cup play-off round |
| 3 | CSC Champa | 26 | 16 | 6 | 4 | 57 | 24 | +33 | 54 | |
| 4 | Electricite du Laos | 26 | 14 | 4 | 8 | 78 | 44 | +34 | 46 | |
| 5 | National University of Laos | 26 | 14 | 2 | 10 | 43 | 36 | +7 | 44 | |
| 6 | VSV United | 26 | 12 | 7 | 7 | 52 | 46 | +6 | 43 | |
| 7 | Savan United | 26 | 11 | 8 | 7 | 59 | 36 | +23 | 41 | |
| 8 | Lao Police | 26 | 8 | 3 | 15 | 45 | 54 | −9 | 27 | |
| 9 | Lao Army | 26 | 6 | 8 | 12 | 41 | 57 | −16 | 26 | |
| 10 | Ezra | 26 | 7 | 4 | 15 | 37 | 61 | −24 | 25 | |
| 11 | Young Elephant | 26 | 3 | 12 | 11 | 17 | 45 | −28 | 21 | |
| 12 | Saythany City | 26 | 4 | 4 | 18 | 36 | 106 | −70 | 16 | |
| 13 | Champasak United | 26 | 2 | 8 | 16 | 60 | 83 | −23 | 14 | |
| 14 | Eastern Star | 26 | 4 | 2 | 20 | 24 | 91 | −67 | 14 | |

Updated to match(es) played on 23 August 2016. Source: Soccerway
Rules for classification: 1) points; 2) goal difference; 3) number of goals scored.

== Results ==
=== Matchday 1 ===
| 26 March 2016 | Lao Army | 1–1 | National University of Laos | Vientiane |
| 09:00 GMT | | Report | | Stadium: Army Stadium KM5 |

| 26 March 2016 | Eastern Star | 0–0 | Champasak United | Vientiane |
| 09:00 GMT | | Report | | Stadium: New Laos National Stadium |

| 26 March 2016 | Lanexang United | 1–0 | Lao Police | Vientiane |
| 11:00 GMT | | Report | | Stadium: Lanexang Stadium |

| 27 March 2016 | Young Elephant | 1–1 | Saythany City | Vientiane |
| 09:30 GMT | | Report | | Stadium: New Laos National Stadium |

| 27 March 2016 | Lao Toyota | 2–0 | CSC Champa | Vientiane |
| 11:00 GMT | | Report | | Stadium: Laos National Stadium |

| 27 March 2016 | Electricite du Laos | 1–1 | Savan United | Vientiane |
| 12:00 GMT | | Report | | Stadium: Lanexang Stadium |

| 27 March 2016 | Ezra | 2–2 | VSV United | Vientiane |
| 12:00 GMT | | Report | | Stadium: New Laos National Stadium |

=== Matchday 2 ===
| 2 April 2016 | Eastern Star | 1–3 | National University of Laos | Vientiane |
| 09:30 GMT | | Report | | Stadium: New Laos National Stadium |

| 2 April 2016 | CSC Champa | 3–2 | VSV United | Pakse |
| 10:00 GMT | | Report | | Stadium: Champasak Stadium |

| 2 April 2016 | Lao Police | 0–1 | Young Elephant | Vientiane |
| 12:00 GMT | | Report | | Stadium: New Laos National Stadium |

| 3 April 2016 | Champasak United | 0–5 | Savan United | Pakse |
| 10:00 GMT | | Report | | Stadium: Champasak Stadium |

| 3 April 2016 | Lao Army | 5–2 | Saythany City | Vientiane |
| 10:30 GMT | | Report | | Stadium: Army Stadium KM5 |

| 3 April 2016 | Lao Toyota | 4–0 | Electricite du Laos | Vientiane |
| 11:00 GMT | | Report | | Stadium: Laos National Stadium |

| 3 April 2016 | Lanexang United | 9–1 | Ezra | Vientiane |
| 12:00 GMT | | Report | | Stadium: Lanexang Stadium |

=== Matchday 3 ===
| 9 April 2016 | Eastern Star | 0–7 | Electricite du Laos | Vientiane |
| 09:30 GMT | | Report | | Stadium: New Laos National Stadium |

| 9 April 2016 | Lao Army | 1–2 | Lanexang United | Vientiane |
| 10:00 GMT | | Report | | Stadium: Army Stadium KM5 |

| 9 April 2016 | Ezra | 1–2 | Lao Toyota | Vientiane |
| 11:00 GMT | | Report | | Stadium: Lanexang Stadium |

| 9 April 2016 | Young Elephant | 0–0 | CSC Champa | Vientiane |
| 12:00 GMT | | Report | | Stadium: New Laos National Stadium |

| 10 April 2016 | Saythany City | 2–1 | Champasak United | Vientiane |
| 10:00 GMT | | Report | | Stadium: New Laos National Stadium |

| 10 April 2016 | VSV United | 2–1 | Lao Police | Vientiane |
| 12:00 GMT | | Report | | Stadium: Lanexang Stadium |

| 4 May 2016 | Savan United | 1–0 (Note: Originally scheduled for 10 April 2016 at Savannakhet Stadium in Savannakhet before being postponed until 4 May 2016 at New Laos National Stadium in Vientiane, kick-off was moved from 10:00 to 11:00.) | National University of Laos | Vientiane |
| 11:00 GMT | | Report | | Stadium: New Laos National Stadium |

=== Matchday 4 ===
| 23 April 2016 | CSC Champa | 2–3 | Eastern Star | Pakse |
| 10:00 GMT | | Report | | Stadium: Champasak Stadium |

| 23 April 2016 | Saythany City | 0–7 | Lao Toyota | Vientiane |
| 11:00 GMT | | Report | | Stadium: New Laos National Stadium |

| 23 April 2016 | Electricite du Laos | 2–0 | Lao Army | Vientiane |
| 12:00 GMT | | Report | | Stadium: Lanexang Stadium |

| 24 April 2016 | National University of Laos | 5–1 | VSV United | Vientiane |
| 10:00 GMT | | Report | | Stadium: National University of Laos Stadium |

| 24 April 2016 | Champasak United | 0–3 | Ezra | Pakse |
| 10:00 GMT | | Report | | Stadium: Champasak Stadium |

| 24 April 2016 | Savan United | 3–3 | Lao Police | Vientiane |
| 11:00 GMT | | Report | | Stadium: New Laos National Stadium |

| 24 April 2016 | Lanexang United | 3–0 | Young Elephant | Vientiane |
| 12:00 GMT | | Report | | Stadium: Lanexang Stadium |

=== Matchday 5 ===
| 30 April 2016 | Saythany City | 0–8 | Savan United | Vientiane |
| 09:30 GMT | | Report | | Stadium: New Laos National Stadium |

| 30 April 2016 | Ezra | 0–3 | CSC Champa | Vientiane |
| 12:00 GMT | | Report | | Stadium: Lanexang Stadium |

| 30 April 2016 | Lao Police | 2–5 | Electricite du Laos | Vientiane |
| 12:00 GMT | | Report | | Stadium: New Laos National Stadium |

| 1 May 2016 | Lao Army | 1–1 | VSV United | Vientiane |
| 10:00 GMT | | Report | | Stadium: Army Stadium KM5 |

| 1 May 2016 | Champasak United | 0–0 | Young Elephant | Pakse |
| 10:00 GMT | | Report | | Stadium: Champasak Stadium |

| 1 May 2016 | National University of Laos | 0–3 | Lanexang United | Vientiane |
| 11:00 GMT | | Report | | Stadium: National University of Laos Stadium |

| 4 May 2016 | Lao Toyota | 2–0 | Eastern Star | Vientiane |
| 12:00 GMT | | Report | | Stadium: New Laos National Stadium |

=== Matchday 6 ===
| 7 May 2016 | Saythany City | 2–8 | Lao Police | Vientiane |
| 09:30 GMT | | Report | | Stadium: Laos National Stadium |

| 7 May 2016 | National University of Laos | 0–0 | Champasak United | Vientiane |
| 11:00 GMT | | Report | | Stadium: National University of Laos Stadium |

| 7 May 2016 | CSC Champa | 1–0 | Lanexang United | Pakse |
| 11:00 GMT | | Report | | Stadium: Champasak Stadium |

| 7 May 2016 | Eastern Star | 1–0 | Lao Army | Vientiane |
| 11:00 GMT | | Report | | Stadium: Laos National Stadium |

| 8 May 2016 | Lao Toyota | 3–0 | VSV United | Vientiane |
| 11:00 GMT | | Report | | Stadium: New Laos National Stadium |

| 8 May 2016 | Savan United | 1–1 | Ezra | Savannakhet |
| 11:00 GMT | | Report | | Stadium: Savannakhet Stadium |

| 8 May 2016 | Electricite du Laos | 0–0 | Young Elephant | Vientiane |
| 12:00 GMT | | Report | | Stadium: Lanexang Stadium |

=== Matchday 7 ===
| 14 May 2016 | Saythany City | 3–4 | Eastern Star | Vientiane |
| 09:30 GMT | | Report | | Stadium: Laos National Stadium |

| 14 May 2016 | CSC Champa | 2–0 | Champasak United | Pakse |
| 10:00 GMT | | Report | | Stadium: Champasak Stadium |

| 14 May 2016 | Lanexang United | 1–1 | Savan United | Vientiane |
| 12:00 GMT | | Report | | Stadium: Lanexang Stadium |

| 14 May 2016 | Lao Police | 0–1 | Lao Army | Vientiane |
| 12:00 GMT | | Report | | Stadium: Laos National Stadium |

| 15 May 2016 | Ezra | 1–0 | Young Elephant | Vientiane |
| 10:00 GMT | | Report | | Stadium: Lanexang Stadium |

| 15 May 2016 | National University of Laos | 1–0 | Lao Toyota | Vientiane |
| 11:00 GMT | | Report | | Stadium: National University of Laos Stadium |

| 15 May 2016 | VSV United | 1–1 | Electricite du Laos | Vientiane |
| 12:15 GMT | | Report | | Stadium: Lanexang Stadium |

=== Matchday 8 ===
| 21 May 2016 | Young Elephant | 0–2 | National University of Laos | Vientiane |
| 11:00 GMT | | Report | | Stadium: Laos National Stadium |

| 21 May 2016 | Lao Army | 0–0 | Champasak United | Vientiane |
| 11:00 GMT | | Report | | Stadium: Army Stadium KM5 |

| 21 May 2016 | Electricite du Laos | 5–3 | Ezra | Vientiane |
| 12:00 GMT | | Report | | Stadium: Lanexang Stadium |

| 22 May 2016 | CSC Champa | 2–0 | Savan United | Pakse |
| 10:00 GMT | | Report | | Stadium: Champasak Stadium |

| 22 May 2016 | Saythany City | 0–7 | Lanexang United | Vientiane |
| 10:00 GMT | | Report | | Stadium: Laos National Stadium |

| 22 May 2016 | VSV United | 3–0 | Eastern Star | Vientiane |
| 12:00 GMT | | Report | | Stadium: Lanexang Stadium |

| 22 May 2016 | Lao Police | 0–4 | Lao Toyota | Vientiane |
| 12:30 GMT | | Report | | Stadium: Laos National Stadium |

=== Matchday 9 ===
| 28 May 2016 | Ezra | 4–3 | Saythany City | Vientiane |
| 10:00 GMT | | Report | | Stadium: Lanexang Stadium |

| 28 May 2016 | VSV United | 0–0 | Savan United | Vientiane |
| 12:30 GMT | | Report | | Stadium: Lanexang Stadium |

| 29 May 2016 | Lao Army | 2–3 | CSC Champa | Vientiane |
| 10:00 GMT | | Report | | Stadium: Army Stadium KM5 |

Note: Remaining four matches from Matchday 9 were postponed due to international call-ups, namely with Laos for their friendly match against Nepal and then their 2019 AFC Asian Cup qualifiers versus India. New dates not yet announced.

=== Matchday 10 ===
| 4 June 2016 | Lao Police | 3–2 | Ezra | Vientiane |
| 11:00 GMT | | Report | | Stadium: New Laos National Stadium |

| 4 June 2016 | Electricite du Laos | 2–0 | CSC Champa | Vientiane |
| 12:00 GMT | | Report | | Stadium: Lanexang Stadium |

| 5 June 2016 | Champasak United | 0–4 | VSV United | Pakse |
| 10:00 GMT | | Report | | Stadium: Champasak Stadium |

Note: Remaining four matches from Matchday 10 were postponed due to international call-ups, namely with Laos for their 2019 AFC Asian Cup qualifiers versus India. New dates not yet announced.

=== Matchday 11 ===
| 11 June 2016 | Eastern Star | 0–4 | Savan United | Vientiane |
| 10:00 GMT | | Report | | Stadium: Laos National Stadium |

| 11 June 2016 | Electricite du Laos | 7–1 | Saythany City | Vientiane |
| 12:00 GMT | | Report | | Stadium: Lanexang Stadium |

| 11 June 2016 | Young Elephant | 1–1 | VSV United | Vientiane |
| 12:30 GMT | | Report | | Stadium: Laos National Stadium |

| 12 June 2016 | Lao Army | 0–4 | Lao Toyota | Vientiane |
| 10:00 GMT | | Report | | Stadium: Army Stadium KM5 |

| 12 June 2016 | Ezra | 1–3 | National University of Laos | Vientiane |
| 10:00 GMT | | Report | | Stadium: Lanexang Stadium |

| 12 June 2016 | CSC Champa | 4–0 | Lao Police | Pakse |
| 10:00 GMT | | Report | | Stadium: Champasak Stadium |

| 12 June 2016 | Lanexang United | 3–2 | Champasak United | Vientiane |
| 12:30 GMT | | Report | | Stadium: Lanexang Stadium |
