= 2025–26 Lao League 1 =

Pepsi Lao League 1
- Season: 2025–26
- Dates: 16 August 2025 – 14 March 2026
- Champions: Ezra; 2nd title
- AFC Challenge League: Ezra
- ASEAN Championship: Ezra
- Matches: 180
- Goals: 314 (1.74 per match)
- Best player: Peter Phanthavong
- Top goalscorer: Koki Narita (22 goals)
- Best goalkeeper: Solasak Thilavong (9 clean sheets)
- Biggest home win: Ezra 11–0 Savannakhet (8 February 2026)
- Biggest away win: Savannakhet 1–8 Ezra (28 September 2025); Savannakhet 0–7 Champasak Avenir (8 March 2026)
- Highest scoring: Mazda GB 10–2 Savannakhet (25 January 2026)
- Longest unbeaten run: 10 matches Ezra
- Longest winless run: 18 matches Savannakhet
- Longest losing run: 11 matches Savannakhet
- Highest attendance: 2,156; Salavan United 2–2 Namtha United (23 August 2025)
- Lowest attendance: 500; Young Elephants 6–0 Lao Army (23 August 2025)
- All statistics correct as of 28 August 2025.

The 2025–26 Lao League 1, also known as the 2025–26 Pepsi Lao League 1 for sponsorship reasons, was the 36th season of the Lao League 1, the top Laos professional league for association football clubs since its establishment in 1988. Ezra successfully defended their title from the previous season.

== Teams ==
A total of 10 teams participated in the 2025–26 Lao League 1 season.

Promoted from the Lao League 2 provincial leagues

- Salavan United runners-up of the Salavan League 2
- Savannakhet runners-up of the Savannakhet League 2

=== Stadiums and locations ===
Note: Table lists in alphabetical order.

Team	Location	Stadium	Capacity	Previous season
Army	Vientiane	Army Stadium Km5	1,500	Lao League 1 (5th)
BIS Master	Vientiane	New Laos National Stadium (outside field)	500	Lao League 1 (8th)
Champasak Avenir	Champasak Province	Champasak Stadium	8,000	Lao League 1 (2nd)
Ezra	Vientiane	New Laos National Stadium (outside field)	500	Lao League 1 (3rd)
Luang Prabang	Luang Prabang Province	Luang Prabang Stadium	7,000	Lao League 1 (4th)
Mazda GB	Vientiane	New Laos National Stadium (outside field)	500	Lao League 1 (7th)
Namtha United	Luang Namtha Province	Luang Namtha Province Stadium	1,000	Lao League 1 (6th)
Salavan United	Salavan Province	Salavan Province Stadium	3,000	Lao League 2 (1th)
Savannakhet	Savannakhet Province	Savannakhet Stadium	10,000	Lao League 2 (1st)
Young Elephants	Vientiane	New Laos National Stadium (outside field)	500	Lao League 1 (1st)

== Personnel and sponsoring ==
Team	Manager	Captain	Kit manufacturer	Kit sponsor(s)	
Team	Manager	Captain	Kit manufacturer	Main	Other(s)
Army	(Laos) Kovanh Namthavixay	(Laos) Sisavath Dalavong	(Laos) Life Football	None	List: Front: None; Back: None; Sleeves: None; Shorts: None
Bis Master	(Laos) Bounlap Khenkitisack	(Laos) Chitpasong Latthachak	(Laos) Life Football		List: Front: None; Back: None; Sleeves: None; Shorts: None
Champasak Avenir	(South Korea) Kim Tae-young	(South Korea) Ku Kyo-cheol	(Laos) Life Football	Fan Pick 11	List: Front: None; Back: Booyoung Group; Sleeves: PLCO, Fitogether; Shorts: None
Ezra	(South Korea) Na Byung-soo	(Laos) Anantaza Siphongphan	(Laos) Life Football	SkyVision	List: Front: Broker Smile, Thai Namthip, Coca-Cola; Back: Eternal Coffee; Sleeves: Chue Chin Hua, Chakawan; Shorts: None
Luang Prabang	(Laos) Khamsay Chanthavong	(Liberia) Emmanuel Jugbe Doe	(Laos) PAPON Sportswear		List: Front: None; Back: None; Sleeves: None; Shorts: None
Mazda GB	(Laos) Oley Bousa-art	(Laos) Soukaphone Vongchiengkham	(Laos) PAPON Sportswear	Mazda	List: Front: None; Back: None; Sleeves: Kimberley Apartment; Shorts: None
Namtha United	(Laos) Viengsavanh Sayyaboun	(Laos) Sengphachan Bounthisanh	(Laos) Evo Store	Coca-Cola	List: Front: iCAR; Back: None; Sleeves: None; Shorts: None
Salavan United	(Laos) Phoutpasong Sengdalavong	(Laos) Nalongsith Chanthasily	(Laos) LAZA Sport		List: Front: None; Back: None; Sleeves: None; Shorts: None
Savannakhet	(Laos) Hatsadong Lok-aphone	(Laos) Mitpaza Luangpaserth	(Laos) Life Football	Fable Sports Consulting	List: Front: None; Back: None; Sleeves: None; Shorts: None
Young Elephants	(Laos) Kanlaya Sysomvang	(Laos) Kittisak Phomvongsa	(Thailand) FBT	Phu Bia Mining	List: Front: Saysaath Pharma, Lao Digital TV; Back: Lao Airlines; Sleeves: Aviation Guard Lao; Shorts: None

== Managerial changes ==
Team	Outgoing	Manner	Exit date		Position in table	Incoming	Incoming date		Ref.
Team	Outgoing	Manner	Announced on	Departed on	Position in table	Incoming	Announced on	Arrived on	Ref.
Bis Master	(Laos) Phouphet Sanouvong	Sacked	2025		Pre-season	(Laos) Bounlap Khenkitisack	December 2025		
Luang Prabang	(Laos) Phonepadith Xayavong	Sacked	2025		Pre-season	(Laos) Khamsay Chanthavong	December 2025		
Salavan United	(Thailand) Kittichai Wongsim	Sacked	2025		Pre-season	(Laos) Phoutpasong Sengdalavong	December 2025		
Savannakhet	(Laos) Khamsay Chanthavong	Sacked	2025		Pre-season	(Laos) Hatsadong Lok-aphone	Juanary 2026		

== Foreign players ==
For the 2025–26 season, LFF adopted a registration system based on three distinct "routes", allowing teams to specialize their recruitment.

1) AFC-Only Route

- Clubs may register up to 10 foreign players, all of whom must be nationals of AFC member associations. A maximum of 7 foreign players may be fielded in a match. Clubs must provide a bank statement showing at least LAK 3 billion (approximately US$139,000), unless they hold an AFC Club Licensing certification for the season.

2) Intercontinental Route

- Clubs may register up to 6 foreign players, consisting of 4 players from outside the AFC, one AFC player, and one ASEAN player. Up to 5 foreign players may be fielded in a match. No bank statement is required.

3) ASEAN-Only Route

- Clubs may register up to 6 foreign players, all of whom must be nationals of ASEAN member associations. All 6 may be fielded in a match. No bank statement is required.

Team	Player 1	Player 2	Player 3	Player 4	Player 5	Player 6	Player 7	Player 8	Player 9	Player 10	Form Player
Army											
Bis Master	(Cameroon) Cyrille Dissake	(Japan) Alao Kenshu Hyonsu	(Uganda) Edema Aziku	(United States) Judah Berry							(Ivory Coast) Michael Archange (Ivory Coast) Amed Diarrassouba
Champasak Avenir	(Philippines) Francis Tacardon	(South Korea) Gu Gyo-cheol	(South Korea) Lee Jung-jin	(South Korea) Lee Sang-Hyung	(South Korea) Lee Yu-min	(South Korea) Park Chan-min	(South Korea) Shim-Yeong woo	(South Korea) Yoo Dong-woo	(South Korea) Yoon Chan		(Japan) Jin An (South Korea) Lee Geon (South Korea) Kim Dae-yeong (South Korea) Ryu Ji-seong
Ezra	(Japan) Reo Nakamura	(Japan) Koki Narita	(Japan) Yusei Shimomura	(South Korea) Jeong Sang-won	(South Korea) Lee Min-hyuk	(Thailand) Thanprakorn Khemru					(Japan) Ren Yoshioka
Luang Prabang	(Australia) Latif Ghazli	(Egypt) Mohamad Abed	(Japan) Masatoshi Takeshita	(Japan) Ren Yoshioka	(Liberia) Emmanuel Jugbe Doe						(Japan) Tsukasa Watanabe
Mazda GB	(Japan) Ryoki Imaizumi	(Japan) Shian Kawasaki	(Japan) Toshinari Sato	(Japan) Shogo Umazume	(Uzbekistan) Asilbek Orifzhonov						(Uzbekistan) Mukhammad Odilov
Namtha United	(Japan) Hiroya Fujibayashi	(Japan) Takuya Watanabe									(Japan) Daiki Jahana (Japan) Mao Negishi (Japan) Yusuke Suzuki (South Korea) Kim Min-seong (United States) Judah Berry
Salavan United	(Japan) Kohsuke Asano	(Japan) Kaisei Hara	(Japan) Soichi Kinoshita	(Japan) Reiya Matsuda	(Japan) Takuya Ogata	(Japan) Nasu Okamoto	(Japan) Takaya Sugasawa	(Japan) Rintaro Tsuchitani	(South Korea) Kang Yoon-seok		(Japan) Tsukasa Shimomura (Japan) Takuya Watanabe
Savannakhet	(Egypt) Elkofory Abdelnaby	(France) Jilo Niamke	(Japan) Yoshiki Terasaka								(Chile) Cesar Gustavo (Chile) Carlos Javier (South Korea) Cha Seung-yeon (South Korea) Hwang Tae-hyeon (South Korea) Joo Taeh-wan (South Korea) Kim Seung-beom (Philippines) Irineo Sibal III
Young Elephants	(Egypt) Saad El Mokanen	(Japan) Tsukasa Shimomura	(South Korea) Jung Hyun-wook								(Brazil) Luan Borges (Brazil) Gabriel Carrera (Japan) Taiga Fujikawa (South Korea) Moon Chi-Sung

== League table ==
Pos	Team	Pld	W	D	L	GF	GA	GD	Pts	Qualification or relegation
1	Ezra (C, Q)	18	15	1	2	63	16	+47	46	Qualification for the AFC Challenge League and ASEAN Club Championship
2	Young Elephants	18	14	2	2	46	8	+38	44	
3	Mazda GB	18	10	4	4	50	21	+29	34	
4	Champasak Avenir	18	8	4	6	34	19	+15	28	
5	Army	18	8	3	7	24	32	−8	27	
6	Salavan United	18	7	5	6	31	27	+4	26	
7	Luang Prabang	18	5	5	8	25	30	−5	20	
8	Namtha United	18	5	4	9	23	34	−11	19	
9	BIS Master	18	1	5	12	15	49	−34	8	
10	Savannakhet	18	0	1	17	10	85	−75	1	

Source: FIFA Lao League
Rules for classification: 1) points; 2) goal difference; 3) number of goals scored.
(C) Champions; (Q) Qualified for the phase indicated

== Results ==
Home \ Away	BIS	CPK	EZR	ARM	LPB	GB	NTU	SLV	SVK	YEP
BIS Master	—	0–0	0–3	2–3	1–6	1–1	1–2	1–4	1–0	1–1
Champasak Avenir	2–0	—	1–2	3–1	1–0	2–3	3–2	3–1	8–0	0–0
Ezra	4–2	0–2	—	7–0	5–0	2–0	3–0	2–0	11–0	1–6
Lao Army	3–1	1–0	0–3	—	3–0	1–1	2–0	1–1	2–1	0–1
Luang Prabang	1–1	1–0	1–4	1–2	—	0–3	4–0	2–2	1–0	1–3
Mazda GB	7–0	5–1	2–2	4–2	1–1	—	3–1	3–1	10–2	0–1
Namtha United	3–2	1–1	0–3	0–0	1–1	0–3	—	1–2	5–0	1–4
Salavan United	3–0	0–0	1–2	1–0	2–2	3–1	2–2	—	4–0	1–2
Savannakhet	2–2	0–7	1–8	0–4	0–4	0–3	1–3	2–3	—	0–5
Young Elephants	4–0	3–0	0–1	6–0	1–0	1–0	0–1	3–0	5–1	—

Source: FIFA Lao League
Legend: Blue = home team win; Yellow = draw; Red = away team win.

== Season statistics ==
=== Top scorers ===
As of 14 March 2026

Rank	Player	Team	Goals
1	(Japan) Koki Narita	Ezra	22
2	(Laos) Peter Phanthavong	Ezra	21
3	(Japan) Toshinari Sato	Mazda GB	16
4	(Laos) Tee Sihalath	Lao Army	15
5	(Japan) Tsukasa Shimomura	Salavan United / Young Elephants	13
5	(Laos) Kouaycheng Noophackde	Champasak Avenir	13
7	(Laos) Souksavanh Hopchakkawan	Namtha United	9
8	(Laos) Kydavone Souvanny	Young Elephants	8
9	(Japan) Masatoshi Takeshita	Luang Prabang	6
9	(Laos) Avilay Siphavanh	Salavan United	6

=== Hat-tricks ===
Player	For	Against	Result	Date
(Laos) Kydavone Souvanny	Young Elephants	Savannakhet	5–1 (H)	16 August 2025
(Brazil) Luan Borges	Young Elephants	Lao Army	6–0 (H)	23 August 2025
(Laos) Cham Vanpaserth	Luang Prabang	BIS Master	6–1 (A)	10 September 2025
(Uzbekistan) Mukhammad Odilov^{4}	Mazda GB	Lao Army	4–2 (H)	13 September 2025
(Laos) Peter Phanthavong	Ezra	Savannakhet	8–1 (A)	28 September 2025
(Japan) Koki Narita	Ezra	Savannakhet	8–1 (A)	28 September 2025
(Laos) Peter Phanthavong^{4}	Ezra	Lao Army	7–0 (H)	18 October 2025
(Japan) Toshinari Sato	Mazda GB	BIS Master	7–0 (H)	19 October 2025
(Uzbekistan) Asilbek Orifzhonov	Mazda GB	Salavan United	3–1 (H)	2 November 2025
(Laos) Kouaycheng Noophackde^{4}	Champasak Avenir	Savannakhet	8–0 (H)	2 November 2025
(Japan) Tsukasa Shimomura	Salavan United	BIS Master	3–0 (H)	6 November 2025
(Japan) Toshinari Sato	Mazda GB	Savannakhet	10–2 (H)	25 January 2026
(Japan) Koki Narita	Ezra	Namtha United	3–0 (H)	31 January 2026
(Japan) Koki Narita^{5}	Ezra	Savannakhet	11–0 (H)	8 February 2026
(Laos) Peter Phanthavong	Ezra	Savannakhet	11–0 (H)	8 February 2026
(Laos) Tee Sihalath	Lao Army	Savannakhet	4–0 (A)	14 February 2026
(Laos) Souksavanh Hopchakkawan	Namtha United	Savannakhet	5–0 (A)	1 March 2026
(Japan) Tsukasa Shimomura	Young Elephants	Namtha United	4–1 (A)	8 March 2026
(Laos) Kouaycheng Noophackde	Champasak Avenir	Savannakhet	7–0 (A)	8 March 2026
(Laos) Phetvixay Phimmasen	Champasak Avenir	Savannakhet	7–0 (A)	8 March 2026

=== Clean sheets ===
Rank	Player	Team	Clean sheets
1	(Laos) Solasak Thilavong	Young Elephants	9
2	(South Korea) Lee Sang-hyung	Champasak Avenir	8
3	(Laos) Kop Lokphathip	Ezra	7
4	(South Korea) Lee Min-hyuk	Ezra	3
4	(Japan) Natsu Okamoto	Salavan United	3
4	(Laos) Keo-Oudone Souvannasangso	Lao Army	3
4	(Laos) Anoulak Vilaphonh	Mazda GB	3
8	(Laos) Anavin Malathong	Luang Prabang	2
8	(Laos) Saymanolinh Paseuth	Mazda GB	2
8	(Laos) Gamekeela Bounliyaphanh	Namtha United	2
8	(Laos) Sengphachan Bounthisanh	Namtha United	2
8	(Laos) Soulisack Souvankham	Namtha United / Luang Prabang	2
8	(Laos) Chanthasone Siliamphone	BIS Master / Champasak Avenir	2
