= List of football clubs in Laos =

This is a list of football clubs located in Laos, sorted by alphabetically.

- Ai-Sport FC
- Bank F.C.
- Champasak United F.C.
- CSC Champa F.C.
- Eastern Star F.C.
- Electricite du Laos F.C.
- Evo United
- Ezra F.C.
- Friends Development F.C.
- HBT 941 FC
- Hoang Anh Attapeu F.C.
- Lanexang United F.C.
- Lao Airlines F.C
- Lao-American College F.C.
- Lao Army
- Luang Prabang FC
- BIS Master F.C.
- Ministry of Public Security
- Ministry of Public Works and Transport F.C.
- Muanghat United FC
- Namtha United
- National University of Laos F.C.
- Savannakhet F.C.
- Viengchanh F.C.
- Vientiane F.C.
- Vientiane FT
- Yotha F.C.
- Young Elephants
- Warriors F.C

== See more leagues ==
- Lao League 1
- Lao League 2
- Lao FF Cup
- Laotian Prime Minister's Cup
