= 2017 Lao Premier League =

Lao Premier League
- Season: 2017

The 2017 Lao League was the 28th season of the Lao Premier League. The league was composed of clubs starts on 1 April 2017. Lanexang United were the defending champions, having won their first league title in 2016.

== Teams ==
A total of 8 teams participated in the 2017 Lao League season, 1 promoted from the previous season of Lao Division 1 League. 6 teams withdrew from the league, including defending champions, Lanexang United after winning the 2016 season due to Laos match fixing scandal.

Locations of the 2017 Lao Premier League teams

=== Stadia ===
Note: Table lists in alphabetical order.

Team	Stadium	Capacity
Champasak United	Champasak Stadium	12,000
DK FC	Laos National Stadium	15,000
Lao Police	New Laos National Stadium	25,000
Lao Toyota	New Laos National Stadium	25,000
National University of Laos	National University of Laos Stadium	5,000
Savan United	Savannakhet Stadium	15,000
Savannakhet	Savannakhet Stadium	15,000
Vientiane United	Laos National Stadium	15,000

== League table ==
Pos	Team	Pld	W	D	L	GF	GA	GD	Pts	Qualification
1	Lao Toyota	14	12	1	1	46	10	+36	37	Qualification to AFC Cup play-off round and Mekong Club Championship
2	Lao Police	14	9	2	3	33	16	+17	29	
3	National University of Laos	14	9	1	4	20	15	+5	28	
4	DK FC	14	6	2	6	19	27	−8	20	
5	Savannakhet	14	5	2	7	23	27	−4	17	
6	Savan United	14	4	2	8	19	26	−7	14	
7	Vientiane United	14	3	1	10	21	31	−10	10	
8	Champasak United	14	1	3	10	17	38	−21	6	

Updated to match(es) played on 3 August 2017. Source: Soccerway
Rules for classification: 1) points; 2) goal difference; 3) number of goals scored.
