= 2015 Lao Premier League =

Football league

Lao Premier League
- Season: 2015

Statistics of Lao Premier League in the 2015 season. The league is composed of clubs starts on 28 February 2015. Hoang Anh Attapeu are the defending champions, having won their first league title in 2014.

== Clubs ==
- Champasak United
- Ezra
- Hoang Anh Attapeu
- Lanexang United
- Lao Police Club
- Young Elephant
- SHB Vientiane
- Lao Toyota FC
- EDL FC
- Eastern Star FC
- Savan FC

== Format ==
Over the course of a season, which runs annually from January to July, each team plays twice against the others in the league, once at 'home' and once 'away'. Three points are awarded for a win, one for a draw and zero for a loss. The teams are ranked in the league table by points gained, then goal difference, then goals scored and then their head-to-head record for that season.

== Stadium ==
Club	Based	Home stadium	Capacity	Manager
Champasak United	Pakse	Champasak Stadium	12,000	(Laos) Virasith Sounakeovongsa
Ezra	Vientiane	New Laos National Stadium	25,000	(South Korea) Na Byung Soo
SHB Vientiane	Vientiane	Laos National Stadium	15,000	
Hoàng Anh Attapeu	Attapeu	Attapeu Stadium	12,000	(Vietnam) Huỳnh Văn Ảnh
Lao Toyota FC	Vientiane	National University of Laos National Stadium	5,000	(England) Dave Booth
Lanexang United	Vientiane	Lanexang Stadium	2,500	(Portugal) Eduardo Almeida
Lao Police Club	Vientiane	New Laos National Stadium	25,000	
Savan	Savannakhet	Savannakhet Stadium	15,000	
Young Elephant	Vientiane	New Laos National Stadium	25,000	
EDL FC	Vientiane	Lanexang Stadium	2,500	
Eastern Star FC	Vientiane	New Laos National Stadium	25,000	

== League table ==
Pos	Team	Pld	W	D	L	GF	GA	GD	Pts	Qualification
1	Lao Toyota FC	20	15	3	2	63	21	+42	48	Qualification for the Mekong Club Championship AFC Cup Group stage
2	Lanexang United	20	15	3	2	67	16	+51	48	
3	SHB Vientiane	20	13	5	2	51	23	+28	44	
4	Lao Police Club	20	8	6	6	39	33	+6	30	
5	Hoang Anh Attapeu	20	7	5	8	44	47	−3	26	
6	Eastern Star FC	20	7	5	8	33	35	−2	26	
7	Champasak United	20	8	1	11	32	31	+1	25	
8	EDL	20	5	9	6	31	42	−11	24	
9	Savan	20	6	2	12	30	43	−13	20	
10	Young Elephant	20	3	4	13	18	46	−28	13	
11	Ezra	20	1	1	18	15	85	−70	4	

Updated to match(es) played on 13 August 2015. Source: Lao League table
Rules for classification: 1) points; 2) goal difference; 3) number of goals scored.

=== Top scorers ===
Rank	Player	Club	Total
1	(Japan) Kazuo Homma	Lao Toyota	17
2	(Vietnam) Nguyễn Xuân Nam	SHB Vientiane	14
3	(Laos) Sopha Saysana	Hoang Anh Attapeu	11
