= Eastern Star Schools =

Location
- Vientiane Pakse; Laos
- Coordinates: Nongbone Campus 17.972643°N 102.627236°E Thongkan Campus 17°56′15″N 102°37′34″E / 17.937596°N 102.626119°E / 17.937596; 102.626119 Pakse Campus 15.120002°N 105.806193°E

Information
- Type: Private international/Bilingual school
- Established: 2006
- Teaching staff: 55 Foreign
- Grades: K–12
- Enrollment: 800
- Thongkan Campus

- Pakse Campus

International School of Laos (former Eastern Star Schools) is founded in 2006 as a private bilingual school in Vientiane, Laos. Its name was Eastern Star Bilingual School, and this name changed in 2016 to the current name, International School of Laos. School offers coed education in English and Lao for students age 2 to 18 in two different locations.

School has students and teachers from 30 different nationalities.

== HISTORY ==
Opened in 2006 by Mr. Yasmun at Nongbone Village of Xaysetha District. Part of the current main campus location was already a private school operated by a local educator. Mr. Yasmun leased the existing building with its students and surrounding land to extend the campus to a modern private school serving from age 2–18 with a bilingual curriculum. At the same time, Eastern Star Schools operated an international kindergarten called Eastern Star International Kindergarten Watnak at the Watnak Village of Sissatanak District.

A three-story lecture hall with 2 science labs, 1 ICT lab, 27 classrooms and 4 offices completed and start serving students in 2012.

In 2015, Eastern Star Schools opened first English medium International School of the Southern Laos at the Pakse.

In 2016, Eastern Star International Kindergarten Watnak moved to a bigger campus in a closer neighborhood and its name changed to Eastern Star International School Thongkan and primary section was added.

School also owner and operator of one of the Lao Premier League’s football club called Eastern Star FC.

International Achievements

For last five years, school joins international competitions such as Science Olympiads, Math Competitions, Computer Project Competitions and Football Tournaments. Below is the list of achievements:

Year	Name of Competition		Award
2010	Genius Olympiad-Art	USA	Bronze Medal
2012	Genius Olympiad-Art	USA	Bronze Medal
2013	ISWEEP-Science		Bronze Medal
2013	IYIPO-Science		Bronze Medal
2013	DREAMLINE-Design	TURKEY	Silver Medal
2013	INFOMATRIX	ROMANIA	Silver Medal
2013	INEPO	AZERBAIJAN	Bronze Medal
2014	ISWEEP-Science	USA	Bronze Medal
2014	IYIPO-Science	GEORGIA	Bronze Medal
2014	INFOMATRIX-Programming	ROMANIA	Bronze Medal
2015	Mini-World Cup-Football(U15)	THAILAND	Gold Medal
2015	Mini-World Cup-Football(U13)	THAILAND	Silver Medal
2015	INFOMATRIX-Programming	ROMANIA	Bronze Medal
2015	Int’l Math Challenge V	THAILAND	Bronze Medal
2015	IMSO	THAILAND	Silver Medal
2016	Int’l Math Challenge V	THAILAND	Bronze Medal
2016	Mini-World Cup-Football(U15)	THAILAND	Gold Medal
2016	Mini-World Cup-Football(U13)	THAILAND	Gold Medal

== Annual Public Events ==
School hosts 4 annual public events which is either open to public's view or can join as competitor. Oldest of these events is ISMO (Inter School Math Olympiad). The others are:

· International Culture Day

· Science Fair

· Streetball tournament

== Curriculum ==
Offers Cambridge International Schools Curriculum for Primary, Secondary and High School

== Accreditation ==
In the summer of 2016, Eastern Star Schools Executive Committee started international recognition and accreditation initiative. Under this initiative school become a Cambridge International Schools member. Also, under this initiative WASC (Western Association of Schools and Colleges) accreditation process started.

== Extra Curricular Events ==
- Camp nights

- College and Leadership Preparation Program

- ECO Schools

- Academic Olympiad and competition teams

=== Athletics ===
The department staff consists of a professional football player from South Africa, an AFC A level football coach and nation's one of the most famous professional basketball player. School joins boys and girls basketball and football tournaments within Vientiane.
