= Champasak Palace =

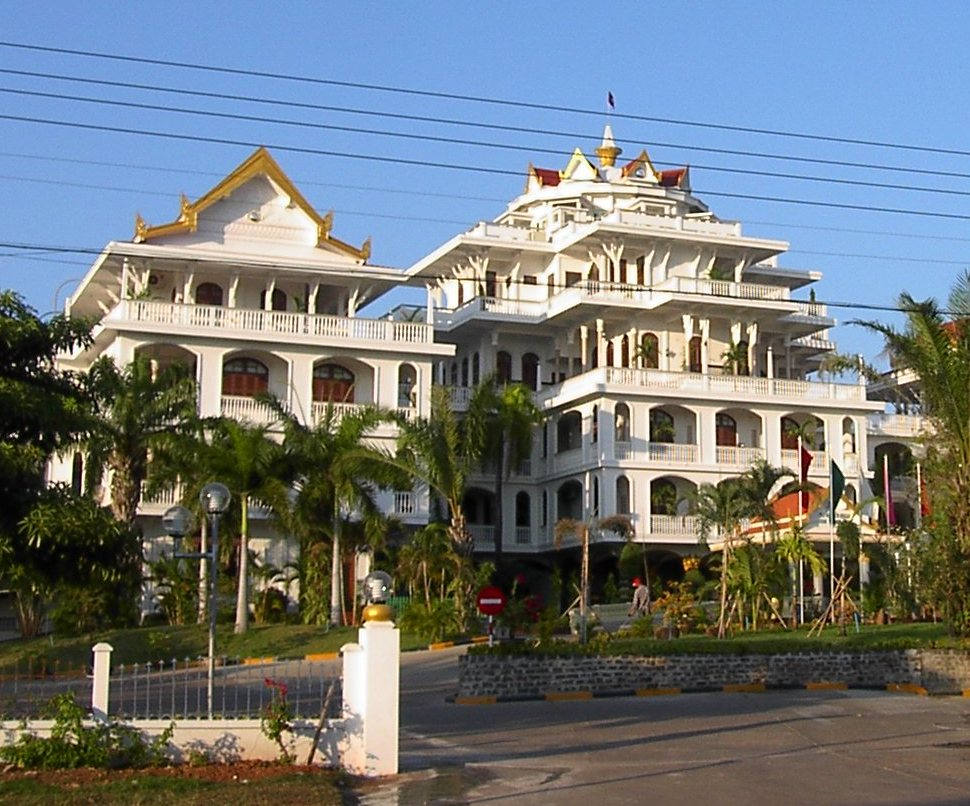
- Champasak Palace
- Interactive map of the Champasak Palace area
- Former names: Wang Nyai Chao Boun Oum

General information
- Type: Former Royal Residence
- Architectural style: French
- Location: Pakse, Laos
- Coordinates: 15°7′20″N 105°48′22″E
- Construction started: 1968
- Completed: 1976

Technical details
- Floor count: 5

Champasak Palace, in Pakse, Laos, was intended to be a residence of the last Prince of Champasak, Chao Boun Oum. However, he had to abandon it in 1974 before it was finished, as the Royal Lao government was overthrown by the communist Pathet Lao. After the revolution, the building was completed and served as a venue for the communist party congresses and accommodation for visiting dignitaries. The palace was converted into a hotel in 1995 after a Thai company succeeded in its negotiations with the Laotian government.
