= Abu Kamara (footballer, born 1997) =

Liberian footballer

Personal information
- Full name: Abu Razard Kamara
- Date of birth: 1 April 1997 (age 29)
- Place of birth: Monrovia, Liberia
- Height: 1.82 m (6 ft 0 in)
- Position: Forward

Youth career
- Boulevard United
- Georgia FC

Senior career*
Years	Team	Apps	(Gls)
2014–2015	Ganta Black Stars	20	(2)
2015	Champasak United	0	(0)
2016	CSC Champa	8	(16)
2016	VSV United	18	(25)
2017	Feronikeli	1	(0)
2017–2018	Dukagjini	1	(0)
2018–2019	Rudar Velenje	8	(0)
2020–2021	Dukagjini	5	(5)
2021–2022	Makedonija	12	(3)
2022–2023	Kuching City	22	(13)
2024	Dibba Al-Hisn	13	(3)
2024–2025	Manama Club	17	(6)
2025	Al-Seeb	8	(7)
2025–2026	PSM Makassar	13	(3)
2026	→ Persis Solo (loan)	2	(0)

International career
2021–2023	Liberia	9	(0)
- * Club domestic league appearances and goals as of 5 March 2026

Abu Razard Kamara (born 1 April 1997) is a Liberian professional footballer who plays as a forward.

== Club career ==
In March 2014, Kamara began his senior career with Liberian first division club Ganta Black Stars.

In 2016, he signed for the Lao Premier League team CSC Champa.

In February 2022, Kamara joins Malaysian Premier League team Kuching City F.C. In May, he scored a hattrick for Kuching City F.C. on a goal-scoring spree as they trashed Selangor F.C. II 5–1 in their Premier League match at Petaling Jaya City Council Stadium.

At the end of the season, Abu-Kamara won the Malaysian Premier League top goal-scorer with 11 goals which left Faisal Halim and Zulhilmi de Paula way far behind.

== International career ==
He made his debut for the Liberia national football team on 3 September 2021 in a World Cup qualifier against Nigeria, a 0–2 away loss. He substituted Terrence Tisdell in the 57th minute.

== Honors ==
Kuching City

- MFL Challenge Cup runner-up: 2023
