= Soukthavy Soundala =

Laotian footballer

Personal information
- Full name: Soukthavy Soundala
- Date of birth: 4 November 1995 (age 31)
- Place of birth: Vientiane, Laos
- Height: 1.70 m (5 ft 7 in)
- Position: Goalkeeper

Team information
- Current team: Salavan United
- Number: 31

Senior career*
Years	Team	Apps	(Gls)
2013	Ezra		
2014–2015	Hoang Anh Attapeu		
2016–2017	Lanexang United	30	(0)
2018–2021	Chanthabouly	14	(0)
2022–2025	Master	23	(0)
2025–2026	Young Elephants	0	(0)
2026–	Salavan United	1	(0)

International career
2012–2017	Laos	10	(0)
- * Club domestic league appearances and goals

Soukthavy Soundala (born 4 November 1995) is a Laotian professional footballer who as a goalkeeper for Salavan United. He first played for the Laos national football team at the 2012 AFF Suzuki Cup. At only 17 years he came on for Sengphachan Bounthisanh in a 4–3 loss to Singapore. He then played in two 2014 AFF Championship qualification matches in victories over Cambodia and East Timor.
