= Lee Jeong-jin (footballer) =

South Korean footballer

- Lee in 2026

Personal information
- Full name: Lee Jeong-jin
- Date of birth: 23 December 1993 (age 32)
- Place of birth: Daejeon, South Korea
- Height: 1.54 m (5 ft 1/2 in)
- Positions: Winger; wing-back

Youth career
- 2011: Cheongdam High School
- 2012–2013: Dongyang University
- 2014–2015: Pai Chai University

Senior career*
Years	Team	Apps	(Gls)
2015	johor Darul Ta'zim F.C.	16	(6)
2016	Busan IPark	14	(2)
2017	Gangwon FC	0	(0)
2018	Cheonan City	3	(0)
2019–2020	Yeoju Citizen	5	(0)
2021	Customs United	5	(0)
2021–2022	Bangkok FC	10	(2)
2022	SV Neuhof	2	(0)
2022–2023	CE Mataró	20	(1)
2026	Champasak Avenir	8	(4)
- * Club domestic league appearances and goals

Lee Jung-Jin (Korean: 이정진; born 23 December 1993) is a South Korean professional footballer and YouTuber, who plays as a winger or wing-back.

== Early life ==
Lee learned to play football on the school team at Cheongdam High School. He continued his football aspirations in university, playing for Donggang University and Pai Chai University's football teams.

== Club career ==
Lee began his career at johor Darul Ta'zim when he momentarily moved to malaysia; johor Darul Ta'zim F.C., where he made only 16 appearances in total and managed to score 6 goals and 7 assists.

Lee began his senior professional career in Busan IPark when he signed a deal on 21 January 2016, returning to South Korea. There, he made 14 appearances. He made his debut for the club on 13 April 2016 in a 2–1 defeat to Seoul E-Land, and his first goal came in a 4–0 victory over Chungju on 10 July of that year.

In January 2017, he transferred to Gangwon FC, and one year later; in January 2018 he moved to Cheonan City FC, making 3 appearances in his 2 seasons there. In February 2019 he moved to Yeoju Citizen FC, making 6 appearances for the club. In February 2021 he made his move to MOF Customs United FC, where he made 6 appearances in 5 months. In July of the same year he transferred to Bangkok FC, where he made 3 appearances and scored his first two goals in a 2–0 victory over Prime Bangkok FC on 6 October. On 27 October he scored his third goal in a 3–0 victory over See Khwae City FC. Lee transferred to the Hessenliga with SV Neuhof in 2022; however, issues with obtaining an extension for his visa meant he only played in two games for the club before being unable to remain in Germany any longer.

He went on to move to Spanish side CE Mataró for the 2022–23 Primera Catalana season, contributing one goal and three assists in his 20 appearances within the league before departing from the club.

On 13 October 2024, Lee announced he had joined Returns FC, an amateur football side in South Korea, part of the KA League, considered to be the one of highest levels of semi-professional football within South Korea.

On 9 December 2025, it was announced that Lee joining with the Lao League 1 club Champasak Avenir.

== Outside of Football ==
Lee is also known for his YouTube channel where he posts videos about him training for and playing association football matches.
