= Stéphane Blanc =

French footballer (born 1992)

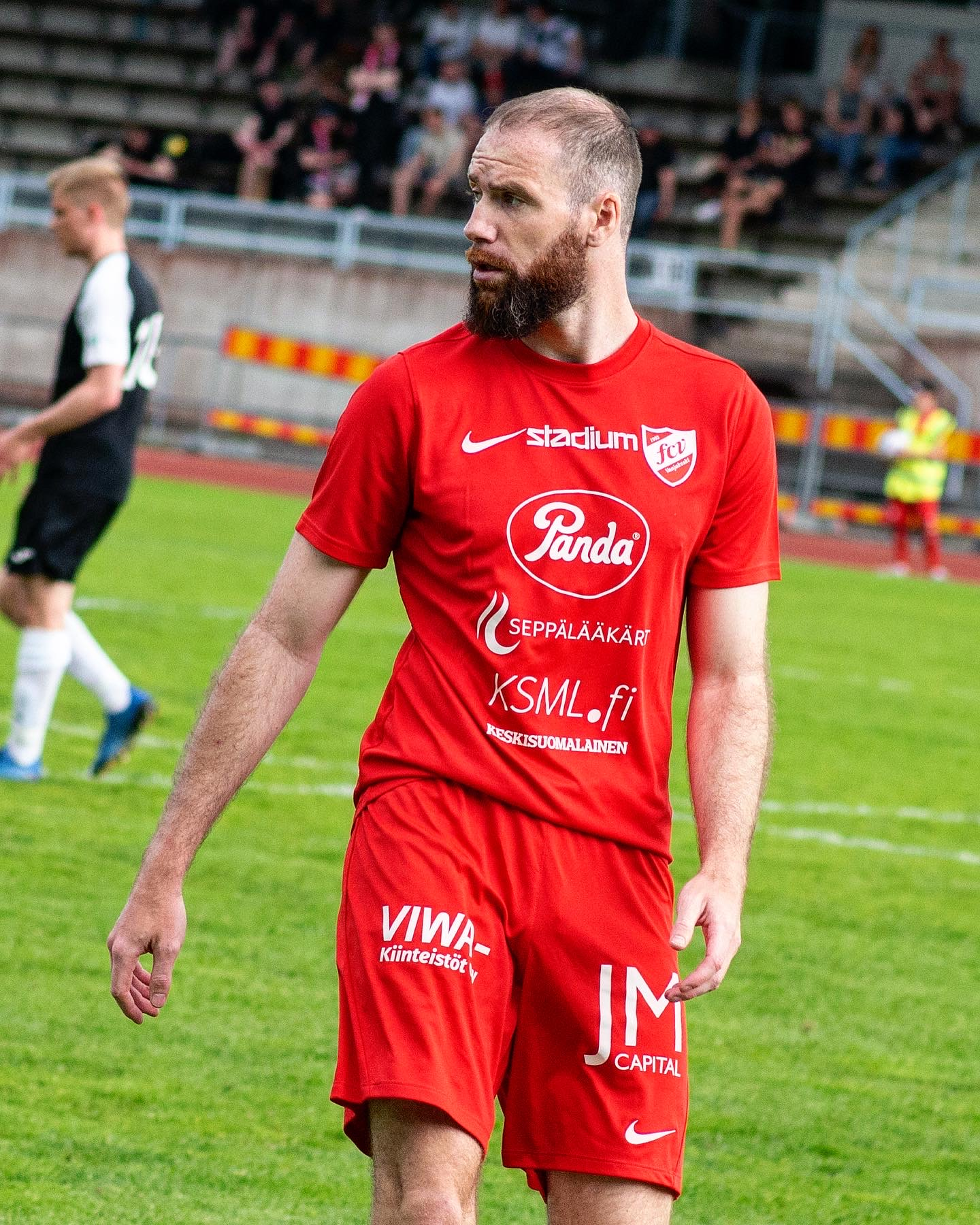

Personal information
- Date of birth: 30 December 1992 (age 33)
- Place of birth: Audincourt, France
- Height: 1.88 m (6 ft 2 in)
- Position: Forward

Team information
- Current team: Salavan United
- Number: 92

Senior career*
Years	Team	Apps	(Gls)
2009–2013	US Boncourt		
2013–2014	FC Boncourt 05		(14)
2014–2015	FC Courtemaîche		
2015–2016	FC Alle		(8)
2016	FC Moutier	7	(2)
2017	FC Bassecourt		
2017–2018	Penya Encarnada d'Andorra	6	(1)
2018	JS Lure		(1)
2019	FC Grandvillars		(4)
2020	Oulun Työväen Palloilijat	15	(11)
2021	Kemi City F.C.	18	(2)
2022	FC Vaajakoski	13	(0)
2022–2023	Central & Western District R&SA	12	(3)
2023–2024	Wong Tai Sin DRSC	4	(0)
2024	Windsor Arch Ka I	11	(4)
2024–2025	Brera Ilch FC	11	(3)
2025–2026	Club Valencia	7	(1)
2026–	Salavan United		
- * Club domestic league appearances and goals as of 6 June 2026

Stéphane Blanc (born 30 December 1992) is a French professional footballer who plays as a forward.

== Career ==
In January 2018, after several years in semi-professional leagues in Switzerland, and several trials in professional clubs (with Montreal Impact, San Antonio FC, FK Kauno Žalgiris, Mosta F.C., Tarxien Rainbows F.C.), Stéphane signed his first professional contract with Primera Divisió side Penya Encarnada d'Andorra.

He decided to take a break in high level football because he was disappointed about football after problems with an agent, and for personal reasons, but in 2020, after first wave of Covid, Stéphane had the opportunity to move and he joined Oulun Työväen Palloilijat in Finland. He won the Kolmonen the same year, and he had the opportunity to sign the next season with Kakkonen side Kemi City F.C. After a difficult season and a relegation with the club, he joined FC Vaajakoski.

During the mid-season, he received an offer to sign on another continent, so he decided to break his contract, in agreement with the Finnish club, and he signed a one-year contract with the Hong Kong First Division League team, Central & Western District R&SA. With this club, he won the championship, but the club didn’t accept the promotion in Hong Kong Premier League. In 2023, after a pre-season with Hong Kong Football Club, and a few contacts with clubs in Asia, he finally signed with Wong Tai Sin DRSC. In the end, he only played the first four games of the season before terminating his contract. After a few weeks, he made contact with the Macanese Liga de Elite club Windsor Arch Ka I, and signed for the 2024 season. Despite missing out on the playoffs and failing to avoid the club’s relegation to the 2ª Divisão de Macau, he finished the season as his team's top scorer.

In April 2025, after several months of discussions with clubs in Europe and Asia that ultimately failed to lead to the signing of a contract, he finally made contact and signed for Brera Ilch FC in the Mongolian Premier League. Despite a fairly decent season on his part, the club was relegated at the end of the season, and following several problems within the club and the federation (disappearance of investors, unpaid salaries, uncertainty about the start of the 2025/2026 championship), he decided not to extend his contract in Mongolia.

In December 2025, Stéphane received an offer from the Maldives and signed with Club Valencia, a team playing in the Dhivehi Premier League. At the end of the season, the club made headlines in sports newspapers around the world following the relegation controversy it faced, despite the club’s appeals to the federation and FIFA.

For the 2026–2027 season, Stéphane decided to head to a new Asian country to sign with Salavan United F.C., which competes in Lao League 1. The club’s goal of contending for the title and hoping to qualify for Asian competitions next season was the deciding factor.

== Honours ==
Oulun Työväen Palloilijat

- Kolmonen: 2020

Central & Western District R&SA

- Hong Kong First Division League: 2022–23
