= Phoutpasong Sengdalavong =

Laotian footballer

Personal information
- Full name: Phoutpasong Sengdalavong
- Date of birth: June 1, 1983 (age 43)
- Place of birth: Vientiane, Laos
- Height: 1.80 m (5 ft 11 in)
- Position: Goalkeeper

Team information
- Current team: Salavan United (manager)

Senior career*
Years	Team	Apps	(Gls)
2014–2015	Lanexang United		

International career
2007–2014	Laos	11	(0)

Managerial career
- 2015–2016: Lanexang United (assistant)
- 2016–2017: Laos U19 (assistant)
- 2016–2017: Laos U23 (assistant)
- 2019–2022: Viengchanh
- 2022–2023: Laos U16 (assistant)
- 2022–2023: Laos U19 (assistant)
- 2022–2024: Laos U23 (assistant)
- 2023–2024: Young Elephants (assistant)
- 2023–2024: Young Elephants women’s team
- 2023–2024: Laos (assistant)
- 2024: Young Elephants
- 2025: Kunming City (assistant)
- 2025–: Salavan United
- * Club domestic league appearances and goals

Phoutpasong Sengdalavong (born June 1, 1983) is a Laotian football manager and former player who is the manager of Lao League 1 club Salavan United.
