= CSC Champa F.C. =

Football club based in Pakse, Laos

CSC Champa ຊີເອັສຊີ ຈຳປາ
- Full name: CSC Champa Football Club ສະໂມສອນຊີເອັສຊີ ຈຳປາ
- Founded: 2016
- Ground: Champasak Stadium; Champasak, Laos
- Capacity: 12,000
- Manager: Vilasit Sunakeovongsa
- League: Lao Premier League
- 2016: 3rd

CSC Champa Football Club (Laosຊີເອັສຊີ ຈຳປາ) is a professional football club, based in Pakse, Laos, that plays in the Lao Premier League, the highest division in Laotian football. The club plays its home matches at the Champasak Stadium. The club is inactive since 2017.

== Sponsors ==
Period	Sportswear	Sponsor
2016-	(Thailand) Ego Sports	Total S.A.
