= Kydavone Souvanny =

Laotian footballer

Personal information
- Date of birth: 22 December 1999 (age 26)
- Place of birth: Paksong, Champasak, Laos
- Height: 1.70 m (5 ft 7 in)
- Position: Winger

Team information
- Current team: Mazda GB
- Number: 11

Senior career*
Years	Team	Apps	(Gls)
2017	Lao Police Club	20	(10)
2018	Young Elephants	9	(4)
2019–2020	Lao Police Club	11	(8)
2021–2026	Young Elephants	59	(27)
2026–	Mazda GB	2	(1)

International career
2020	Laos U23	6	(0)
2017–	Laos	23	(4)
- * Club domestic league appearances and goals

Kydavone Souvanny (Lao: ກີດາວອນ ສຸວັນນີ; born 22 December 1999) is a Laotian footballer who plays as a winger for Lao League 1 club Mazda GB and the Laos national team.

== Career statistics ==
=== International ===
As of matches played 20 March 2025.

National team	Year	Apps	Goals
Laos	2017	2	0
Laos	2018	0	0
Laos	2019	0	0
Laos	2020	0	0
Laos	2021	4	1
Laos	2022	4	0
Laos	2023	2	0
Laos	2024	5	2
Laos	2025	4	1
Total		21	4

=== International Goals ===
Scores and results list Laos' goal tally first.

No	Date	Venue	Opponent	Score	Result	Competition
1.	12 December 2021	Bishan Stadium, Bishan, Singapore	Indonesia	1–2	1–5	2020 AFF Championship
2.	14 November 2024	PAT Stadium, Bangkok, Thailand	Malaysia	1–1	1–3	Friendly
3.	18 December 2024	Thuwunna Stadium, Yangon, Myanmar	Myanmar	1–1	2–3	2024 ASEAN Championship
4.	20 March 2025	New Laos National Stadium, Vientiane, Laos	Sri Lanka	1–2	1–2	Friendly
