= Takaya Sugasawa =

Japanese footballer

Personal information
- Date of birth: 15 November 1987 (age 38)
- Place of birth: Chiba, Japan
- Height: 1.80 m (5 ft 11 in)
- Position: Midfielder

Senior career*
| Years | Team | Apps | (Gls) |
| 2010 | Japan Soccer College | | |
| 2010 | → Albirex Niigata (S) (loan) | 33 | (4) |
| 2015–2016 | Nakhon Phanom | | |
| 2019 | Singburi Bangrajun | | |
| 2019–2020 | Master 7 | | |
| 2020 | Viengchanh | 8 | (4) |
| 2025 | Salavan United | 18 | (4) |
- * Club domestic league appearances and goals

Takaya Sugasawa (菅澤 孝也, Sugasawa Takaya; born 15 November 1987) is a Japanese professional footballer.

== Career statistics ==
| Club | Season | League | | | Cup | | League Cup | | Other | | Total | |
| Club | Season | Division | Apps | Goals | Apps | Goals | Apps | Goals | Apps | Goals | Apps | Goals |
|---|---|---|---|---|---|---|---|---|---|---|---|---|
| Albirex Niigata (S) | 2010 | S.League | 33 | 4 | 2 (Note: Appearances in the Singapore Cup) | 0 | 1 (Note: Appearances in the Singapore League Cup) | 0 | 0 | 0 | 36 | 4 |
| Viengchanh | 2020 | Lao Premier League | 8 | 4 | 0 | 0 | 1 (Note: Appearances in the Commando LFF Cup) | 1 | 0 | 0 | 9 | 5 |
| Career total | | | 41 | 8 | 2 | 0 | 2 | 1 | 0 | 0 | 45 | 9 |
