= Salavan United F.C. =

Salavan United
- Full name: Salavan United Football Club
- Nicknames: Thap Chang Sarn (ທັບຊ້າງສານ)
- Short name: SLVUTD
- Founded: 2025; 1 year ago
- Ground: Salavan Province Stadium, Salavan, Laos
- Capacity: 3,000
- Chairman: Anousone Dimanivong
- Head coach: Phoutpasong Sengdalavong
- League: Lao League 1
- 2025–26: Lao League 1, 6th of 10
- Website: https://slvutd.com/
Home colours	Away colours	Third colours

Salavan United Football Club (Lao: ສະໂມສອນບານເຕະ ສາລະວັນ ຢູໄນເຕັດ) is a Laotian football club from the city of Salavan in Salavan Province. The team currently plays in the country's top league, the Lao League 1. The club was founded in 2025.

== Team Image ==
=== Stadium ===
The club uses the province stadium located in Ban Na Khok, Salavan City, Salavan Province as its home ground. The stadium has a capacity of 3,000 seats.

=== Kit suppliers and shirt sponsors ===
Period	Kit Manufacturer	Sponsors
2025	(Laos) Laza Sport	2026
2026– present	(Thailand) Ego Sport	2026– present

== Season Ranking ==
Season	League								
Season	Division	Level	Match	W	D	L	Goals	Point	Table
Salavan United FC
2025–26	Lao League 1	1	18	7	5	6	31:27	26	6.

== Players ==
Note: Flags indicate national team as defined under FIFA eligibility rules; some limited exceptions apply. Players may hold more than one non-FIFA nationality.

No.	Pos.	Nation	Player
3	DF	LAO	Toa Keokhamphong
4	DF	JPN	Soichi Kinoshita
5	DF	LAO	Phetdavanh Somsanid
6	MF	LAO	Chanthavixay Khounthoumphone
7	MF	LAO	Soukaphone Vongchiengkham (captain)
8	FW	NGR	Ojeabulu Palito Tony
9	FW	FRA	Arnaud Rollin
11	FW	LAO	Chony Wenpaserth
12	DF	LAO	Anoulack Singsavang
13	GK	LAO	Xaysavath Souvannasok
14	DF	LAO	Viengxay Sidavong
17	FW	LAO	Avilay Siphavanh
18	DF	LAO	Nilandone Xayaseng
19	DF	LAO	Kosee Phongsavath
20	DF	LAO	Sengdaovy Hanthavong
22	MF	LAO	Phithack Kongmathilath
24	DF	LAO	Aphixay Thanakhanty

No.	Pos.	Nation	Player
26	DF	LAO	Phonsak Sisavath
31	GK	LAO	Soukthavy Soundala
33	GK	LAO	Souksamone Vethita
34	DF	THA	Rasin Bamrungphakdee
44	MF	JPN	Rintaro Tsuchitani
55	GK	LAO	Sinphamai Chanthavilay
66	DF	LAO	Sanokson Sengdala
77	FW	LAO	Kardam Koneyer
78	FW	LAO	Anousone Xaypanya
81	MF	THA	Thaweesak Kitraksa
88	MF	LAO	Soukduangchai Inthalath
89	FW	LAO	Phayak Siphanom (on loan from Chainat Hornbill)
90	DF	LAO	Bounpaseuth Thammakhanh
97	FW	LAO	Khampane Duangvilay
99	DF	LAO	Chitpasong Latthachak

== Management and staff ==
Position	Name
Chairman	(Laos) Anousone Dimanivong
Team manager	(Laos) Pasanmit Keokingsamai
Team manager	(Laos) Tony Phommasaeng
Assistant manager	(Laos) Thanakone malathong
Head coach	(Laos) Phoutpasong Sengdalavong
Assistant coach	(Laos) Khamphoumy hanvilay
Goalkeeper coach	(Laos) Phetthaweexay Thilavong
Goalkeeper coach	(Laos) Chanthakhad Sianphongsay
Doctor	(Laos) Sivilay Sihathep
Doctor	(Laos) Souvanny Phommachan
Physical Trainer	(Laos) Duangphachan Lalaimthavixay
Kit man	(Laos) On phonepheng
Kit man	(Laos) Khampaserd Thummalungsee
Kit man	(Laos) Anouthone Paphutsalang
Kit man	(Laos) Lathtanaphon Dimanivong

== Media ==
Position	Name
Graphic&Media marketing	(Laos) Sakda Asa
Photographer	(Laos) Ae Duanglasy

== Managerial history ==
Start: 22. December 2025

Name	Period	Honours
(Thailand) Kitthachai Wongsim	6 July 2025 – 22 October 2025	
(Laos) Phoutpasong Sengdalavong	23 October 2025 –	
