= Lao League 2 =

Association football league in Laos

Lao League 2 ລາວ ລີກ 2
- Founded: 2020; 6 years ago
- Country: Laos
- Confederation: AFC
- Level on pyramid: 2
- Promotion to: Lao League 1
- Domestic cup: LFF Lao Ford Cup
- Broadcaster(s): LAOFF TV
- Website: laoleague.com
- Current: 2026–27

The Lao League 2 is a second-level association football league in Laos. The latest winner of the league was Savannakhet F.C.

== Champions ==
- 2018: Lao Army
- 2019: Muanghat United
- 2020: Lao Army
- 2023: HBT 941
- 2024: Savannakhet
