= Sengphachan Bounthisanh =

Laotian footballer

Personal information
- Full name: Sengphachan Bounthisanh
- Date of birth: 1 June 1987 (age 39)
- Place of birth: Vientiane, Laos
- Height: 1.70 m (5 ft 7 in)
- Position: Goalkeeper

Team information
- Current team: Namtha United
- Number: 55

Youth career
- Vientiane FC

Senior career*
Years	Team	Apps	(Gls)
2003–2013	Vientiane FC	67	(0)
2013–2014	SHB Champasak	16	(0)
2014–2015	Hoang Anh Attapeu	15	(0)
2015–2017	Eastern Star	22	(0)
2017–2019	Lao Toyota	4	(0)
2022	Muanghat United	0	(0)
2023	Bolikhamxay	0	(0)
2025–	Namtha United	11	(0)

International career^{‡}
2001	Laos U-17		
2005–2009	Laos U-23	8	(0)
2006–2018	Laos	27	(0)
- * Club domestic league appearances and goals as of June 07, 2014 ‡ National team caps and goals as of June 07, 2014

Sengphachan Bounthisanh (born 1 June 1987) is a Laotian professional footballer who plays as a goalkeeper for Lao League 1 club Namtha United. He had also played for the Laos national football team.
