= Champasak Stadium =

Football stadium in Pakse, Laos

Coordinates: 15°7′6″N 105°48′59″E

- Lak2
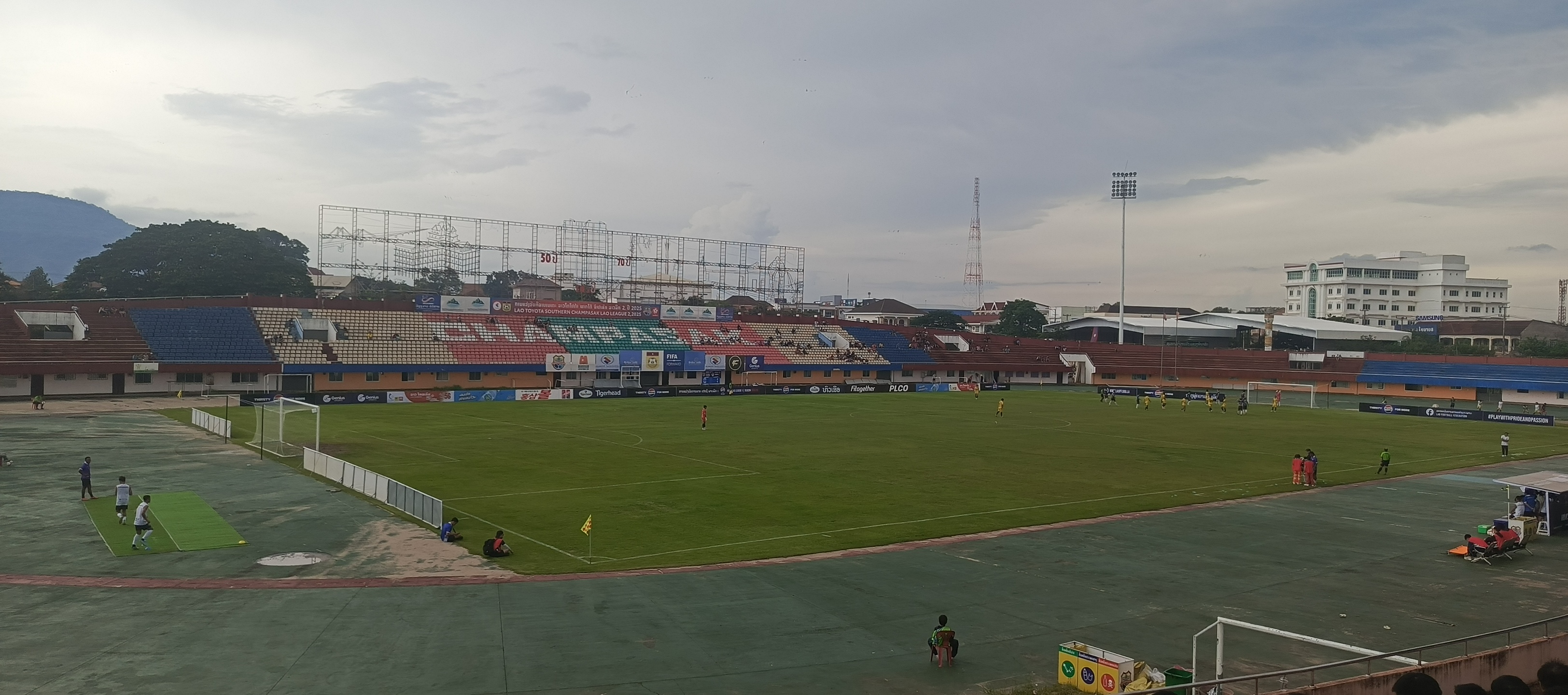
- Champasak Stadium during the 2025–26 Lao League 1 between Champasak Avenir vs. Ezra
- Interactive map of Champasak Stadium
- Former names: Champasak Stadium
- Location: Pakse, Laos
- Owner: Champasak province
- Operator: Champasak.FC
- Capacity: 12,000
- Surface: Grass

Construction
- Groundbreaking: 2008
- Opened: 2010
- Renovated: 2019
- Expanded: not specified
- Closed: Not
- Demolished: Not
- Cost: not specified
- Architect: Champasak

Tenants
- Champasak United F.C. 2015-2018; CSC Champa F.C. 2016; Champasak FC 2022-

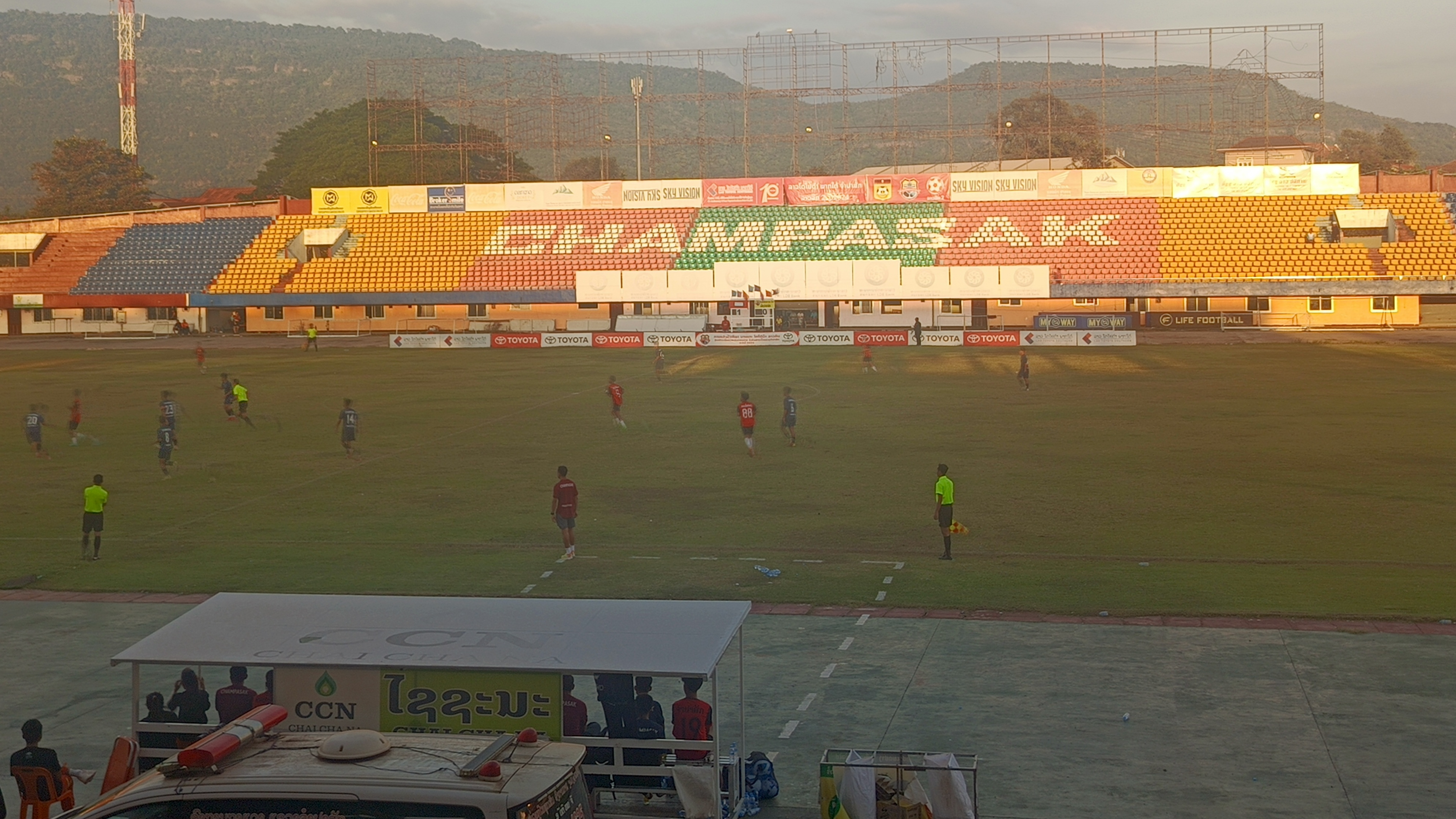
Champasak Stadium in 2024

The Champasak Stadium or Champassack Stadium is a football stadium in Keo Samphan village, Pakse, Champasak Province, Laos. It is the home of Champasak F.C and it is located just north of the Daoruang Market. It has blue and green tribunes and a proper running track around the field. The stadium is sometimes used for ceremonies and concerts. in 2010, when it had a seating capacity of 5,000, it was expanded. The stadium now holds up to 12,000 people. The stadium is named after the region Champasak, of which Pakse is the capital, Laos PDR.
