= National University of Laos F.C. =

National University of Laos
- Full name: National University of Laos Football Club
- Nickname: ສະໂມສອນກິລາເຕະບານ ມະຫາວິທະຍາໄລແຫ່ງຊາດລາວ NUOL FC
- Founded: 2016
- Ground: National University of Laos Stadium; Vientiane, Laos
- Capacity: 5,000
- Chairman: National University of Laos
- Manager: Vacant
- League: Lao Premier League

National University of Laos Football Club is a professional football club based in Vientiane, Laos, that plays in the Lao Division 1. The club plays its home matches at the National University of Laos Stadium, which seats 5,000.

== Kit manufacturers and sportswear ==
Period	Sportswear
2016	(Thailand) Warrix Sports
2017	(Thailand) Spicer
