= Mazda GB F.C. =

Laotian association football club

Mazda GB
- Full name: Mazda GB Football Club
- Founded: January 1, 2018; 8 years ago
- Ground: New Laos National Stadium (outside field)
- Capacity: 500
- Chairman: Thipphanet Keomanivong
- Manager: Oley Bousaart
- League: Lao League 1
- 2025–26: Lao League 1, 3rd of 10
Home colours	Away colours

Mazda GB Football Club (Lao: ສະໂມສອນບານເຕະ ມາດສດ້າ ຈີບີ) is a professional football club based in Vientiane, Laos. The club was founded on 1 January 2018 and currently competes in the Lao League 1, the top tier of Laotian football. The team plays its home matches at the 500-capacity New Laos National Stadium (outside field). The club is a separate entity from the historical Vientiane F.C. (also known as Vientiane Capital) and the dissolved SHB Vientiane F.C.

== History ==
Viengchanh F.C. was founded in 2018 and has been a regular participant in the top-flight Lao League 1 since 2020. In the 2020 season, they finished 6th out of 7, narrowly avoiding relegation. The 2021 season was abandoned due to the COVID-19 pandemic; at the time of abandonment, Viengchanh was in 5th place after three matches. In the 2022 season, they finished 6th out of seven teams once again. The 2023 season was particularly difficult for the club. They finished bottom of the league, in 8th place. During this season, the team suffered a notable 18–0 away defeat to Luang Prabang F.C. on 2 July. This was one of the heaviest defeats in the league's history and part of a four-game spell where the team conceded 53 goals.

== Sponsorship ==
As of the 2024–25 season, the club is listed on the Lao Football Federation website as Mazda Viengchanh F.C., indicating a sponsorship arrangement with the car manufacturer Mazda.

== Players ==
As of 8 February 2025

Note: Flags indicate national team as defined under FIFA eligibility rules; some limited exceptions apply. Players may hold more than one non-FIFA nationality.

No.	Pos.	Nation	Player
1	GK	LAO	Solasak Thilavong
—	GK	LAO	Anoulak Vilaphon
6	DF	LAO	Kittisak Phomvongsa
11	FW	LAO	Kydavone Souvanny

== League and cup history ==
Season	League	Position	Pld	W	D	L	GF	GA	GD	Pts
2019	Lao Division 1 League	8	14	4	3	7	23	29	-6	15
2020	Lao League 1	6	12	3	3	6	12	29	-17	12
2021	Lao League 1	5 (season abandoned)	3	0	1	2	2	5	-3	1
2022	Lao League 1	6	18	3	6	9	20	47	-27	15
2023	Lao League 1	8	14	2	2	10	11	78	-67	8

== See also ==
- Vientiane F.C.
- SHB Vientiane F.C.
