= Eastern Star F.C. =

Soccer club in Laos

Eastern Star
- Full name: Eastern Star Football Club
- Short name: ESFC
- Founded: 2008
- Ground: New Laos National Stadium, Laos
- Capacity: 25,000
- Head coach: Khamsai Chanthavong
- League: Lao Premier League
- 2016: Lao Premier League, 14th

Eastern Star Football Club was a football club from Vientiane, Laos. It last played in the Lao Premier League.

== Sponsors ==
Period	Sportswear	Sponsor
2014	(Italy) Kappa	
2015	(Thailand) Warrix Sports	
2016	(Thailand) FBT	
