= Savannakhet Zelos F.C. =

Savannakhet Zelos
- Full name: Savannakhet Zelos Football Club
- Founded: 1993; 33 years ago
- Ground: Savannakhet Stadium, Savannakhet, Laos
- Capacity: 15,000
- Owner: ZELOS Inc.
- Chairman: Takuya Watanabe
- Head coach: Vacant
- 2025–26: Lao League 1, 10th of 10
- Website: https://svzfc.com/
Home colours	Away colours

Savannakhet Zelos Football Club (Lao: ສະໂມສອນບານເຕະ ສະຫວັນນະເຂດ ເຊໂລສ) is a professional football club based in Savannakhet Province, Laos. The club currently play in the Lao League 1.

== Players ==
Note: Flags indicate national team as defined under FIFA eligibility rules; some limited exceptions apply. Players may hold more than one non-FIFA nationality.

No.	Pos.	Nation	Player
1	GK	JPN	Nasu Okamoto
3	DF	LAO	Nalongsit Chanthalangsy
4	DF	JPN	Shota Inoue
6	MF	LAO	Chakkavanh Manivong
8	MF	LAO	Chanthavixay Khounthoumphone
9	FW	JPN	Takaya Sugasawa
11	MF	JPN	Ryosuke Honda
15	MF	JPN	Shion Mitarai

No.	Pos.	Nation	Player
19	FW	JPN	Taku Hishida
22	FW	LAO	Sonexay Phanhthaxay
28	MF	LAO	Phoutthasay Khochalern
32	DF	JPN	Keita Sato
—	DF	LAO	Phisith Orr
—	DF	JPN	Ryusei Kodaira
—	DF	LAO	Visaithat Nanthavong
—	MF	LAO	Sounthonekhoth Phommavongvixay
—	MF	LAO	Kakar Phoutphatay
—	FW	JPN	Ryusei Seike
—	FW	LAO	Thanousack Nanthavongdouangsy
—	FW	LAO	Xayxana Sihalath

== Coaching staff ==
Position	Name
Head coach	Vacant
Assistant coach	Hatsadong Lorkaphone
Goalkeeper coach	
Fitness coach	
Match analyst	
Doctor	
Physiotherapists	
