= Savannakhet Stadium =

Multi-purpose stadium in Savannakhet, Laos

Coordinates: 16°35′14.5″N 104°45′55.7″E

Savannakhet stadium
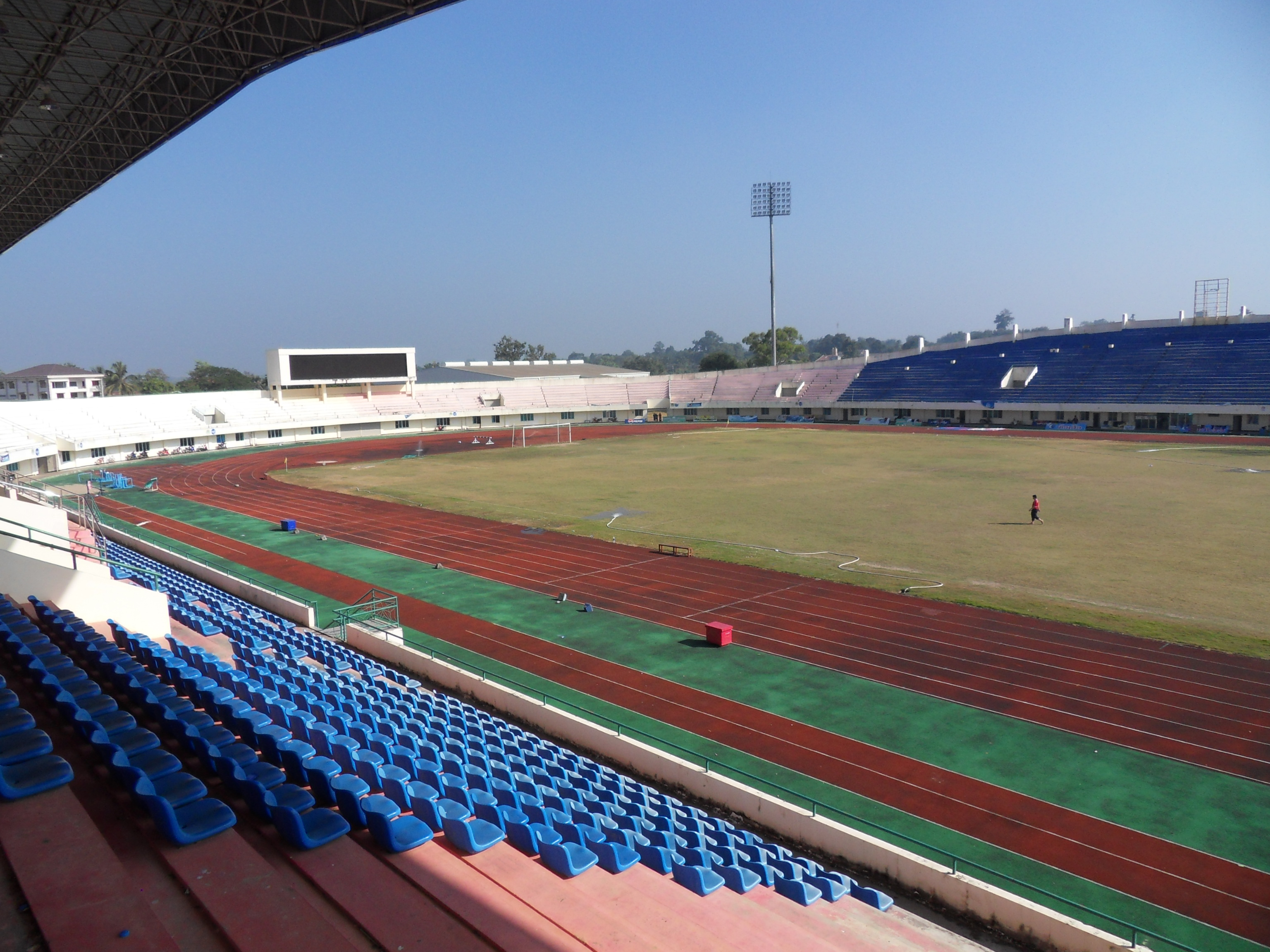
- Interactive map of Savannakhet stadium
- Location: Savannakhet, Laos
- Capacity: 15,000
- Surface: Grass
- Field size: 95 x 60 m

Construction
- Opened: March 2005

Tenant
- Savannakhet FC 2015; Savan United 2016-2017; Thip Savan 2017

The Savannakhet stadium, also known as Savannakhet Provincial stadium, is a multi-purpose stadium in Savannakhet, Laos. It is used mostly for football matches. The stadium is built in 2005 and holds 15,000 people. Since 2006, some matches of the Lao League have been played there. The stadium is also the home of Savannakhet FC, who play in the Lao League.
