= Champasak Avenir F.C. =

Football club based in Laos

Champasak Avenir
- Full name: Champasak HAGL Avenir Football Club
- Nickname: The dolphins
- Short name: CHM
- Founded: 2015; 11 years ago as IDSEA Champasak United Football Club; 2022; 4 years ago as Champasak Football Club; 2025; 1 year ago as Champasak Avenir Football Club
- Ground: Champasak Stadium
- Capacity: 12,000
- Owner(s): Connected Plus Co., Ltd.
- Chairman: Bae Ji-sun
- Head coach: Kim Tae-young
- League: Lao Premier League
- 2025–26: Lao League 1, 4th of 10
- Website: cpkavenir.com
Home colours	Away colours

Champasak HAGL Avenir Football Club (Lao: ສະໂມສອນບານເຕະ ຈໍາປາສັກ ຮ່ວງແອັງຢາລາຍ ອາເວເນຍ) is a professional football club based in Pakse, Champasak Province, Laos. The club was established in 2015 and competes in the Lao League 1, the top tier of Laotian football. The club plays its home matches at Champasak Stadium which holds 12,000 people.

== History ==
IDSEA Champasak United was established in 2015, following the relocation of the previous Champasak based professional team SHB Champasak to Vientiane.

The club was rebranded to Champasak Avenir in 2025 through a partnership between the Champasak Provincial Football Federation and Lee Dong Jun (DJ), the CEO of the South Korean company DJ Management. DJ spearheaded the project by establishing Connected Plus Co., Ltd. in Korea with several shareholders. This company then founded Connected Plus Sole Co., Ltd. in Laos, which is now the official operating entity of Champasak Avenir. The new management has a stated goal of winning the league and bringing a new level of professionalism to Laotian football. The club’s development process, from the acquisition to the selection of coaches and players, is being documented for a media project, including a documentary and a YouTube channel.

In June 2026, the club signed a three-year sponsorship agreement with Vietnamese company Hoang Anh Gia Lai Group and was renamed Champasak HAGL Avenir.

== Players ==
=== Current squad ===
As of 10 October 2026 Note: Flags indicate national team as defined under FIFA eligibility rules; some limited exceptions apply. Players may hold more than one non-FIFA nationality.

No.	Pos.	Nation	Player
1	GK	LAO	Thepphakone Sisounarm
3	DF	VIE	Tô Minh Lộc (on loan from Hoang Anh Gia Lai)
4	DF	LAO	Alounxay Thepsouvan
5	DF	KOR	Kim Hwan-hee
7	FW	LAO	Kouaycheng Noophackde
8	MF	LAO	Phouluang Vinnavong
9	FW	LAO	Southanome Oumvongsa
10	MF	KOR	Um Ji-hwan
11	FW	VIE	Nguyễn Bảo Đức (on loan from Hoang Anh Gia Lai)
13	DF	LAO	Anousone Xayyalath
15	DF	LAO	Aekthavee Chanthavilard
17	MF	KOR	Lee Gi-hun
18	FW	KOR	Kim Chae-hyun

No.	Pos.	Nation	Player
19	MF	LAO	Phouthasone Kanhomsavanh
20	DF	KOR	Jang Min
21	DF	LAO	Phonexai Xamonthien
22	MF	LAO	Lektoxa Thongsavath
23	MF	LAO	Phetvixay Phimmasen
24	GK	JPN	Hideyuki Watanabe
26	MF	LAO	Somchai Xaiyachak
33	DF	LAO	Khamsanga Phimmasone
40	DF	KOR	Kim Jae-ha
45	MF	LAO	Xayasith Singsavang
55	GK	LAO	Sankham Thavithong
77	MF	KOR	Park Sang-ha

== Coaching staff ==
As of July 2025

Position	Name
Head coach	(South Korea) Kim Tae-young
Assistant coach	(South Korea) Shin Jong-young
Technical director	(South Korea) Chung Sung-hwan

== Former managers ==
Manager	Season	Achievements
(Japan) Yuki Matsuda	January 2016–May 2016	
(Laos) Khamla Pinkeo	January 2022–December 2023	
(Laos) Phouphet Sanouvong	July 2024–January 2025	
(South Korea) Kim Tae-young	May 2025–present	
