= Pakse =

Pakse ປາກເຊ
- District & municipality
- Pakse District
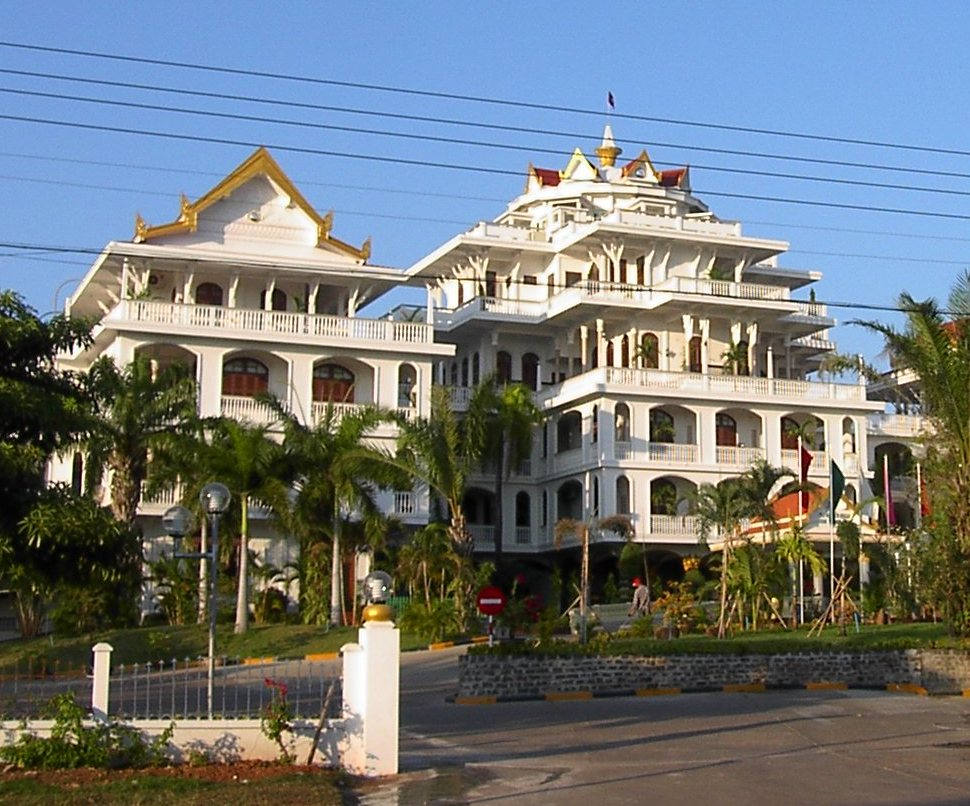
- Champasak Palace Hotel, Pakse, formerly the palace of Prince Boun Oum Na Champassak

- Location in Laos
- Coordinates: 15°07′N 105°47′E
- Country: Laos
- Province: Champasak province
- District: Pakse district

Population (2015)
  - Total: 77,900
  - Religions: Buddhism
- Time zone: UTC+7 (ICT)

Pakse (or Pakxe; French: Paksé; Laotian: ປາກເຊ [pȁːk séː] 'mouth of the river') is the capital and most populous city of the southern Laotian province of Champasak. Located at the confluence of the Xe Don and Mekong Rivers, the district had a population of approximately 77,900 at the 2015 Laotian census.

== History ==
The French established an administrative outpost in Pakse in 1905. The city was the capital of the Lao Kingdom of Champasak until 1946 when the Kingdom of Laos was formed. After the Franco-Thai War the French ceded Preah Vihear Province, formerly belonging to the French protectorate of Cambodia, and the part of Champasak Province located on the other side of the Mekong river from Pakse, which had been part of Laos, to Thailand.

== Demographics ==
In 1943, 62% of the population of Pakse were Vietnamese. Today, Pakse is a centre of the Laotian Chinese community, with a large number of businesses being owned by Laotians of Chinese ancestry.

== Religion ==
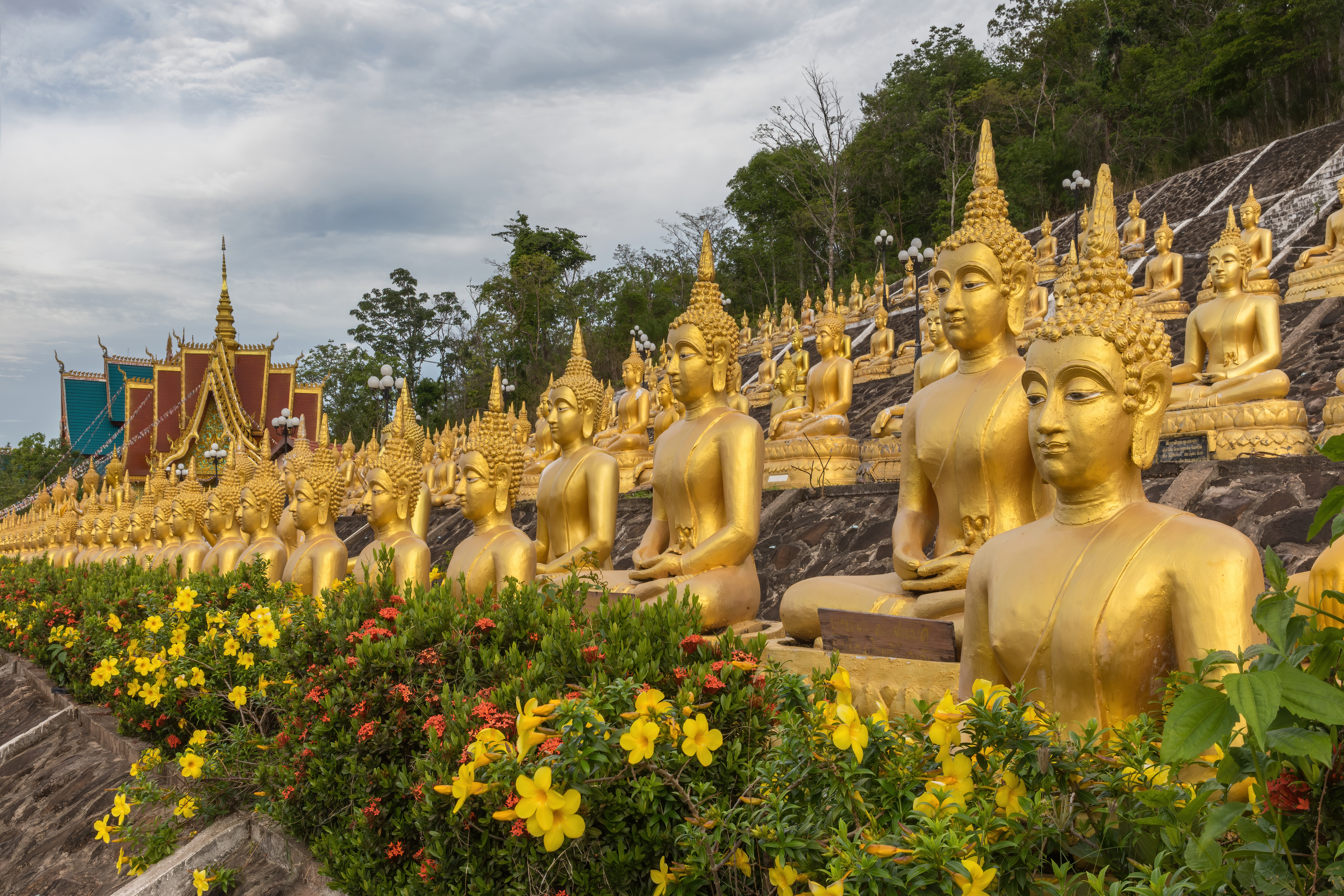
Rows of golden statues of the Buddha seated, with yellow and red flowers, at Wat Phou Salao (Golden Buddha temple), in Pakse.

The population is predominantly Buddhist and the city has temples. These include: Wat Luang, which was built in 1935 and is the largest temple in Pakse, and the Chinese temple Wat Sopsé.

== Infrastructure ==
=== Health ===
There are 2 hospitals in the city.

=== Transportation ===
Pakse International Airport construction was completed on 2 November 2009.

== Climate ==
Pakxe

Climate chart (precipitation, max. and min. temperature)
J	F	M	A	M	J	J	A	S	O	N	D
1.8 31 18	16 33 21	25 35 24	75 35 25	245 33 25	324 31 25	434 31 24	468 30 24	309 30 24	116 31 23	30 31 21	2 30 19
- █ Average max. and min. temperatures in °C
- █ Precipitation totals in mm
Imperial conversion
J	F	M	A	M	J	J	A	S	O	N	D
0.1 89 65	0.6 91 69	1 94 74	3 95 77	9.6 92 77	13 88 76	17 87 76	18 86 76	12 87 75	4.6 87 73	1.2 87 69	0.1 86 65
- █ Average max. and min. temperatures in °F
- █ Precipitation totals in inches

Pakse has a tropical savanna climate (Köppen climate classification Aw). Temperatures are higher in the months before the monsoon season (March–April). There is a wet season (April–October) and dry season (November–March).

Climate data for Pakse (1991–2020)
Month	Jan	Feb	Mar	Apr	May	Jun	Jul	Aug	Sep	Oct	Nov	Dec	Year
Record high °C (°F)	37.0 (98.6)	38.8 (101.8)	39.5 (103.1)	41.4 (106.5)	41.3 (106.3)	38.3 (100.9)	35.9 (96.6)	35.0 (95.0)	36.0 (96.8)	36.7 (98.1)	36.7 (98.1)	36.6 (97.9)	41.4 (106.5)
Mean daily maximum °C (°F)	32.2 (90.0)	33.7 (92.7)	35.2 (95.4)	35.8 (96.4)	33.8 (92.8)	32.0 (89.6)	31.0 (87.8)	30.8 (87.4)	31.1 (88.0)	31.8 (89.2)	31.9 (89.4)	31.3 (88.3)	32.6 (90.6)
Daily mean °C (°F)	26.0 (78.8)	27.8 (82.0)	29.8 (85.6)	30.6 (87.1)	29.5 (85.1)	28.4 (83.1)	27.7 (81.9)	27.5 (81.5)	27.5 (81.5)	27.4 (81.3)	26.8 (80.2)	25.6 (78.1)	27.9 (82.2)
Mean daily minimum °C (°F)	19.2 (66.6)	21.3 (70.3)	24.3 (75.7)	25.8 (78.4)	25.5 (77.9)	25.1 (77.2)	24.6 (76.3)	24.5 (76.1)	24.2 (75.6)	23.2 (73.8)	21.5 (70.7)	19.5 (67.1)	23.2 (73.8)
Record low °C (°F)	7.8 (46.0)	10.8 (51.4)	10.1 (50.2)	16.2 (61.2)	20.3 (68.5)	21.5 (70.7)	21.4 (70.5)	21.5 (70.7)	19.8 (67.6)	16.7 (62.1)	12.4 (54.3)	8.9 (48.0)	7.8 (46.0)
Average precipitation mm (inches)	4.4 (0.17)	8.0 (0.31)	24.9 (0.98)	60.3 (2.37)	203.4 (8.01)	290.7 (11.44)	422.4 (16.63)	444.2 (17.49)	367.2 (14.46)	114.8 (4.52)	24.0 (0.94)	5.5 (0.22)	1,969.9 (77.56)
Average precipitation days (≥ 1.0 mm)	1	1	3	6	16	20	23	24	20	11	4	1	129
Average relative humidity (%)	62	60	59	65	75	82	83	85	84	79	72	67	72.8
Mean monthly sunshine hours	258.6	232.2	235.3	227.2	201.7	149.7	133.0	127.4	138.3	198.7	227.8	248.3	2,378.1
Source 1: World Meteorological Organization
Source 2: NOAA (humidity 1961–1990 and extremes), The Yearbook of Indochina (1932–1933, 1936–1937)

== Tourism ==
Visitors to Pakse's Champasak Province grew from 113,684 in 2006 to 493,180 in 2013.
