= Football at the 2005 SEA Games – Men's team squads =

Below are the squads for the Football at the 2005 SEA Games, hosted by the Philippines, which took place between 1 and 14 December 2005.

== Group A ==
=== Philippines ===
Coach: Aris Caslib

| No. | Pos. | Player | Date of birth (age) | Caps | Club |
|---|---|---|---|---|---|
| | GK | Louie Casas | 12 March 1986 (aged 19) | | (Philippines) San Beda College |
| | GK | Jay-Archie Marcaida | 10 April 1983 (aged 22) | | (Philippines) Far Eastern University |
| | DF | Alexander Borromeo | June 28, 1983 (aged 22) | | (Philippines) Kaya |
| | DF | Phil Greatwich | January 21, 1987 (aged 18) | | (England) Burgess Hill Town |
| | DF | Bervic Italia | 6 July 1983 (aged 22) | | (Philippines) San Beda College |
| | DF | Gerald Orcullo | 19 February 1983 (aged 22) | | (Philippines) San Beda College |
| | DF | Mark Villon | 27 April 1982 (aged 23) | | (Philippines) Santa Barbara |
| | MF | Filippo Braggio | May 17, 1987 (aged 18) | | Unattached |
| | MF | Jesan Candolesa | 15 June 1982 (aged 23) | | (Philippines) Mendiola United |
| | MF | Emelio Caligdong | September 28, 1982 (aged 23) | | (Philippines) Philippine Air Force |
| | MF | Peter Jaugan | 2 July 1983 (aged 22) | | (Philippines) University of Mindanao |
| | MF | Jeffrey Liman | 19 May 1984 (aged 21) | | (Philippines) San Beda College |
| | MF | James Younghusband | September 4, 1986 (aged 19) | | (England) AFC Wimbledon |
| | MF | Vaughn Mellendrez | 29 August 1983 (aged 22) | | (Philippines) Mendiola United |
| | MF | Andy Prochnow | August 13, 1984 (aged 21) | | (Germany) Rot-Weiß Darmstadt |
| | MF | Arnie Pasinabo | February 4, 1986 (aged 19) | | (Philippines) La Salle-Bacolod |
| | FW | Ian Araneta | 2 March 1982 (aged 23) | | (Philippines) Philippine Air Force |
| | FW | Chad Gould | September 30, 1982 (aged 23) | | (England) Southampton |
| | FW | Alvin Valeroso | April 25, 1983 (aged 22) | | (Philippines) University of the East |
| | FW | Phil Younghusband | August 4, 1987 (aged 18) | | (England) Chelsea |

=== Thailand ===
Coach: Charnwit Polcheewin

| No. | Pos. | Player | Date of birth (age) | Caps | Club |
|---|---|---|---|---|---|
| 18 | GK | Kosin Hatairattanakul | March 23, 1982 (aged 23) | | (Thailand) Osotspa |
| 1 | GK | Narit Taweekul | October 30, 1983 (aged 22) | | (Thailand) Tobacco Monopoly |
| 4 | DF | Kiatprawut Saiwaew | January 24, 1986 (aged 19) | | (Thailand) Chonburi |
| 15 | DF | Nattaporn Phanrit | January 11, 1982 (aged 23) | | (Thailand) PEA |
| 13 | DF | Tada Keelalay | April 4, 1984 (aged 21) | | (Thailand) Bangkok Bank |
| 5 | DF | Prat Samakrat | October 31, 1985 (aged 20) | | (Thailand) Bangkok University |
| 3 | DF | Suree Sukha | July 27, 1982 (aged 23) | | (Thailand) Chonburi |
| 2 | DF | Noppol Pitafai | February 1, 1985 (aged 20) | | (Thailand) BEC Tero Sasana |
| 11 | DF | Kraikiat Beadtaku | January 11, 1982 (aged 23) | | (Thailand) Krung Thai Bank |
| 12 | FW | Jakkrit Bunkham | December 7, 1982 (aged 22) | | (Thailand) Osotspa |
| 19 | MF | Pichitphong Choeichiu | August 28, 1982 (aged 23) | | (Thailand) Krung Thai Bank |
| 6 | MF | Sakda Joemdee | April 7, 1982 (aged 23) | | (Vietnam) Hoàng Anh Gia Lai |
| 7 | MF | Datsakorn Thonglao | December 30, 1983 (aged 21) | | (Thailand) BEC Tero Sasana |
| 8 | MF | Suchao Nutnum | May 17, 1983 (aged 22) | | (Thailand) TOT |
| 16 | MF | Suchon Sa-nguandee | March 10, 1982 (aged 23) | | (Thailand) Tobacco Monopoly |
| 20 | MF | Yuttajak Kornchan | May 31, 1982 (aged 23) | | (Vietnam) An Giang |
| 12 | FW | Chakrit Buathong | September 8, 1985 (aged 20) | | (Thailand) Thammasat University |
| 17 | FW | Ekaphan Inthasen | September 23, 1983 (aged 22) | | (Thailand) Bangkok Bank |
| 14 | FW | Teeratep Winothai | February 16, 1985 (aged 20) | | (England) Everton |
| 9 | FW | Preecha Chaokla | January 20, 1983 (aged 22) | | (Thailand) Bangkok Bank |

=== Malaysia ===
Coach: Norizan Bakar

| No. | Pos. | Player | Date of birth (age) | Caps | Club |
|---|---|---|---|---|---|
| | GK | Saiful Amar Sudar | January 19, 1984 (aged 21) | | (Malaysia) Kuala Lumpur FA |
| | GK | Muhammad Al-Hafiz | March 15, 1984 (aged 21) | | (Malaysia) Kedah FA |
| | GK | Remezey Che Ros | September 6, 1982 (aged 23) | | (Malaysia) Pahang FA |
| | DF | Mohd Zulkifli Yusof | January 6, 1982 (aged 23) | | (Malaysia) Pahang FA |
| | DF | Sumardi Hajalan | January 12, 1985 (aged 20) | | (Malaysia) Sabah FA |
| | DF | Mohamad Aslam Haja Najumudeen | | | |
| | DF | Ronny Harun | January 19, 1984 (aged 21) | | (Malaysia) Sabah FA |
| | DF | Ahmad Azlan Zainal | April 16, 1986 (aged 19) | | (Malaysia) Perak FA |
| | DF | Sathia Kumaran Subramaniam | | | (Malaysia) |
| | DF | Thirumurugan Veeran | January 9, 1983 (aged 22) | | (Malaysia) Perak FA |
| | MF | Munir Amran | November 7, 1983 (aged 22) | | (Malaysia) Melaka TMFC |
| | MF | Tengku Hasbullah | March 11, 1983 (aged 22) | | (Malaysia) Melaka TMFC |
| | MF | Zairo Anuar | June 18, 1982 (aged 23) | | (Malaysia) Terengganu FA |
| | MF | Harizul Izuan Abdul Rani | March 3, 1982 (aged 23) | | (Malaysia) Perak FA |
| | MF | Azi Shahril Azmi | September 20, 1985 (aged 20) | | (Malaysia) Perlis FA |
| | MF | Linggam Krishnan | January 2, 1985 (aged 20) | | (Malaysia) Melaka United |
| | MF | Nor Farhan Muhammad | December 19, 1984 (aged 20) | | (Malaysia) Terengganu FA |
| | MF | Mohd Badrul Azam Mohd Zamri | October 18, 1984 (aged 21) | | (Malaysia) Melaka TMFC |
| | MF | Amir Shahreen Mubin | July 27, 1983 (aged 22) | | |
| | FW | Rudie Ramli | May 15, 1982 (aged 23) | | (Malaysia) Melaka TMFC |
| | FW | Surendren Rasiah | October 26, 1982 (aged 23) | | (Malaysia) Perak FA |
| | FW | Mohamad Nor Ismail | August 20, 1982 (aged 23) | | (Malaysia) Johor FC |
| | FW | Mohd Fadzli Saari | January 1, 1983 (aged 22) | | (Malaysia) Pahang FA |
| | FW | Azlan Ismail | October 3, 1984 (aged 21) | | (Malaysia) Kelantan FA |

=== Cambodia ===
Coach:

| No. | Pos. | Player | Date of birth (age) | Caps | Club |
|---|---|---|---|---|---|
| | GK | Ouk Mic | September 15, 1983 (aged 22) | | (Cambodia) Khemara |
| | DF | Thul Sothearith | November 28, 1985 (aged 20) | | (Cambodia) Khemara |
| | DF | Kun Koun | August 9, 1984 (aged 21) | | (Cambodia) Cambodian Army FC |
| | DF | Poeu Samnang | March 13, 1982 (aged 23) | | (Cambodia) Cambodian Navy FC |
| | MF | San Narith | November 7, 1986 (aged 19) | | (Cambodia) Khemara |
| | MF | Hang Sokunthea | January 15, 1982 (aged 23) | | (Cambodia) Phnom Penh Crown FC |
| | MF | Chan Rithy | November 11, 1983 (aged 22) | | (Cambodia) Cambodian Army |
| | MF | Ung Kanyanith | December 12, 1982 (aged 22) | | (Cambodia) Khemara |
| | MF | Bouy Dary | October 13, 1986 (aged 19) | | (Cambodia) Cambodian Navy FC |
| | MF | Sam El Nasa | April 25, 1984 (aged 21) | | (Cambodia) Military Police FC |
| | MF | Keo Kosal | July 13, 1986 (aged 19) | | (Cambodia) Cambodian Army FC |
| | MF | Sun Sovannarith | April 11, 1987 (aged 18) | | (Cambodia) Nagaworld FC |
| | MF | Pen Stephane | May 29, 1986 (aged 19) | | (Cambodia) Cambodian Navy FC |
| | FW | Kouch Sokumpheak | February 15, 1987 (aged 18) | | (Cambodia) Khemara |
| | FW | Teab Vathanak | January 7, 1985 (aged 20) | | (Cambodia) Phnom Penh Crown FC |
| | FW | Hok Sochivorn | September 23, 1983 (aged 22) | | (Cambodia) Cambodian Navy FC |
| | FW | Srey Veasoutna | | | |

== Group B ==
=== Vietnam ===
Coach: (Austria) Alfred Riedl

| No. | Pos. | Player | Date of birth (age) | Caps | Club |
|---|---|---|---|---|---|
| | GK | Bùi Quang Huy | January 5, 1983 (aged 22) | | (Vietnam) Mikado Nam Định |
| | DF | Trần Hải Lâm | July 4, 1982 (aged 23) | | (Vietnam) Hoàng Anh Gia Lai |
| | DF | Châu Lê Phước Vĩnh | June 22, 1985 (aged 20) | | (Vietnam) SHB Đà Nẵng F.C. |
| | DF | Lê Bật Hiếu | August 22, 1984 (aged 21) | | (Vietnam) Vicem Hải Phòng |
| | DF | Lê Văn Trương | February 20, 1983 (aged 22) | | (Vietnam) Huế F.C. |
| | DF | Nguyễn Minh Đức | September 14, 1983 (aged 22) | | (Vietnam) Sông Lam Nghệ An |
| | MF | Nguyễn Văn Biển | April 27, 1985 (aged 20) | | (Vietnam) Mikado Nam Định |
| | MF | Phan Văn Tài Em | April 23, 1982 (aged 23) | | (Vietnam) Đồng Tâm Long An |
| | MF | Lê Tấn Tài | January 4, 1984 (aged 21) | | (Vietnam) Khatoco Khánh Hòa |
| | MF | Nguyễn Quý Sửu | October 18, 1986 (aged 19) | | (Vietnam) Đồng Tháp F.C. |
| | MF | Nguyễn Vũ Phong | February 6, 1985 (aged 20) | | (Vietnam) Becamex Bình Dương |
| | FW | Phan Thanh Bình | November 1, 1986 (aged 19) | | (Vietnam) Đồng Tháp F.C. |
| | FW | Phạm Văn Quyến | April 29, 1984 (aged 21) | | (Vietnam) Sông Lam Nghệ An |
| | FW | Lê Công Vinh | December 10, 1985 (aged 19) | | (Vietnam) Sông Lam Nghệ An |
| | FW | Huỳnh Quốc Anh | May 10, 1985 (aged 20) | | (Vietnam) SHB Đà Nẵng F.C. |
| | FW | Nguyễn Anh Đức | October 24, 1985 (aged 20) | | (Vietnam) Becamex Bình Dương |

=== Singapore ===
Coach:

| No. | Pos. | Player | Date of birth (age) | Caps | Club |
|---|---|---|---|---|---|
| | GK | Lionel Lewis | December 16, 1982 (aged 22) | | (Singapore) Home United FC |
| | DF | Isa Halim | May 15, 1986 (aged 19) | | (Singapore) Young Lions FC |
| | DF | Baihakki Khaizan | January 31, 1984 (aged 21) | | (Singapore) Young Lions FC |
| | MF | Muhammad Ridhuan | May 6, 1984 (aged 21) | | (Singapore) Young Lions FC |
| | MF | Shi Jiayi | September 2, 1983 (aged 22) | | (Singapore) Young Lions FC |
| | MF | Tengku Mushadad | August 7, 1984 (aged 21) | | (Singapore) Young Lions FC |
| | MF | Itimi Dickson | November 14, 1983 (aged 22) | | (Singapore) Woodlands Wellington |
| | FW | Khairul Amri | March 14, 1985 (aged 20) | | (Singapore) Young Lions FC |
| | FW | Agu Casmir | March 23, 1984 (aged 21) | | (Singapore) Young Lions FC |
| | FW | Fazrul Nawaz | April 17, 1985 (aged 20) | | (Singapore) Geylang United |
| | FW | Shahril Ishak | January 23, 1984 (aged 21) | | (Singapore) Young Lions FC |

=== Indonesia ===
Coach: (England) Peter Withe

| No. | Pos. | Player | Date of birth (age) | Caps | Club |
|---|---|---|---|---|---|
| 1 | GK | Samsidar | July 15, 1982 (aged 23) | | (Indonesia) PSM Makassar |
| 2 | DF | Christian Warobay | July 12, 1984 (aged 21) | | (Indonesia) Persipura Jayapura |
| 3 | DF | Leonard Tupamahu | July 9, 1983 (aged 22) | | (Indonesia) Persija Jakarta |
| 4 | DF | Ricardo Salampessy | February 18, 1984 (aged 21) | | (Indonesia) Persipura Jayapura |
| 5 | DF | Maman Abdurrahman | May 12, 1982 (aged 23) | | (Indonesia) PSIS Semarang |
| 6 | MF | Tony Sucipto | February 12, 1986 (aged 19) | | (Indonesia) Sriwijaya |
| 7 | FW | Saktiawan Sinaga | February 19, 1982 (aged 23) | | (Indonesia) PSMS Medan |
| 8 | MF | Jumadi Abdi | March 14, 1983 (aged 22) | | (Indonesia) PKT Bontang |
| 9 | DF | Mahyadi Panggabean | January 8, 1982 (aged 23) | | (Indonesia) PSMS Medan |
| 10 | MF | Zaenal Arif | April 1, 1982 (aged 23) | | (Indonesia) Persib Bandung |
| 11 | FW | Agus Indra Kurniawan | February 27, 1982 (aged 23) | | (Indonesia) Persija Jakarta |
| 12 | GK | Ferry Rotinsulu | December 28, 1982 (aged 22) | | (Indonesia) Sriwijaya |
| 13 | DF | Achmad Jufriyanto | February 7, 1987 (aged 18) | | (Indonesia) Persita Tangerang |
| 14 | DF | Erik Setiawan | December 23, 1983 (aged 21) | | (Indonesia) Persib Bandung |
| 15 | FW | Tantan | August 6, 1982 (aged 23) | | (Indonesia) Persikab Bandung |
| 16 | MF | Syamsul Chaerudin | February 9, 1983 (aged 22) | | (Indonesia) PSM Makassar |
| 17 | MF | Atep | June 5, 1985 (aged 20) | | (Indonesia) Persija Jakarta |
| 18 | MF | Modestus Setiawan | December 17, 1982 (aged 22) | | (Indonesia) PSIS Semarang |
| 19 | FW | Johan Prasetya Wibowo | January 7, 1982 (aged 23) | | (Indonesia) Persik Kediri |
| 20 | MF | Korinus Fingkreuw | February 14, 1983 (aged 22) | | (Indonesia) Persipura Jayapura |
| 21 | DF | Ledi Utomo | June 13, 1983 (aged 22) | | (Indonesia) Persita Tangerang |
| 22 | MF | Siswanto | October 9, 1984 (aged 21) | | (Indonesia) Persekabpas Pasuruan |
| 23 | GK | Roni Tri Prasnanto | December 12, 1985 (aged 19) | | (Indonesia) Persekabpas Pasuruan |

=== Laos ===
Coach: Bounlap Khenkitisack

| No. | Pos. | Player | Date of birth (age) | Caps | Club |
|---|---|---|---|---|---|
| | DF | Kovanh Namthavixay | July 23, 1987 (aged 18) | | (Laos) Lao Army F.C. |
| | MF | Vidalack Souvanhnavongsa | January 13, 1987 (aged 18) | | (Laos) MCTPC |
| | MF | Phayvanh Lounglath | March 8, 1983 (aged 22) | | (Laos) Lao Army F.C. |
| | MF | Khamxay Phakasy | March 21, 1986 (aged 19) | | National University of Laos |
| | MF | Kita Sysavanh | June 19, 1983 (aged 22) | | (Indonesia) PSS Sleman |
| | FW | Visay Phaphouvanin | June 12, 1985 (aged 20) | | (Laos) Vientiane F.C. |
| | FW | Davone Vongsamany | June 25, 1983 (aged 22) | | (Laos) Vientiane F.C. |
| | FW | Lamnao Singto | April 15, 1988 (aged 17) | | (Laos) MCTPC |
| | FW | Souksamay Manhmanyvong | September 20, 1986 (aged 19) | | (Laos) |

=== Myanmar ===
Coach: (Bulgaria) Ivan Kolev

| No. | Pos. | Player | Date of birth (age) | Caps | Club |
|---|---|---|---|---|---|
| | GK | Aung Aung Oo | June 8, 1982 (aged 23) | | (Myanmar) Finance and Revenue F.C. |
| | DF | Moe Win | August 30, 1988 (aged 17) | | (Myanmar) Kanbawza |
| | MF | Soe Thiha Aung | December 12, 1985 (aged 19) | | (Myanmar) Ministry of Construction |
| | MF | Kyaw Thu Ya | December 10, 1984 (aged 20) | | (Myanmar) Finance and Revenue F.C. |
| | MF | Zaw Lynn Tun | June 23, 1983 (aged 22) | | (Myanmar) Home Affairs FC |
| | MF | Myo Min Tun | June 14, 1986 (aged 19) | | (Myanmar) Ministry of Commerce |
| | MF | Kyaw Khing Win | December 23, 1983 (aged 21) | | (Myanmar) Ministry of Energy |
| | MF | Mar La | December 11, 1985 (aged 19) | | (Myanmar) Ministry of Commerce |
| | MF | Zaw Zaw | October 13, 1986 (aged 19) | | (Myanmar) YCDC FC |
| | FW | Soe Myat Min | May 19, 1982 (aged 23) | | (Myanmar) Kanbawza |
