= 2007 AFF Championship squads =

Association football competition squads

Below are the squads for the 2007 AFF Championship co-hosted by Thailand and Singapore which took place between 12 January and 4 February 2007. The players' listed age is their age on the tournament's opening day (12 January 2007).

== Group A ==
=== Thailand ===
Head coach: Chanvit Phalajivin

No.	Pos.	Player	Date of birth (age)	Caps	Club
1	GK	Umarin Yaodam	22 January 1980 (aged 26)		(Thailand) Provincial Electrical Authority
2	DF	Suree Sukha	27 July 1982 (aged 24)		(Thailand) Chonburi
3	DF	Peeratat Phoruendee	15 March 1979 (aged 27)		(Thailand) BEC Tero Sasana
4	DF	Jetsada Jitsawad	5 August 1980 (aged 26)		(Thailand) TTM Phichit
5	DF	Niweat Siriwong	18 July 1977 (aged 29)		(Vietnam) Sài Gòn Port
6	DF	Nattaporn Phanrit	11 January 1982 (aged 25)		(Thailand) Provincial Electrical Authority
7	MF	Datsakorn Thonglao	30 December 1983 (aged 23)		(Vietnam) Hoàng Anh Gia Lai
8	MF	Hatthaporn Suwan	23 February 1984 (aged 22)		(Thailand) Provincial Electrical Authority
9	FW	Sarayoot Chaikamdee	24 September 1981 (aged 25)		(Vietnam) Pisico Bình Định
12	MF	Pichitphong Choeichiu	28 August 1982 (aged 24)		(Thailand) Krung Thai Bank
13	FW	Kiatisuk Senamuang (c)	11 August 1973 (aged 33)		(Vietnam) Hoàng Anh Gia Lai
14	FW	Suchao Nuchnum	17 May 1983 (aged 23)		(Thailand) TOT
15	MF	Jakkrit Bunkham	7 December 1982 (aged 24)		(Thailand) Osotspa
16	MF	Phaisan Pona	13 March 1982 (aged 24)		(Thailand) Chonburi
17	FW	Sutee Suksomkit	5 June 1978 (aged 28)		(Singapore) Tampines Rovers
18	GK	Kosin Hathairattanakool	23 March 1982 (aged 24)		(Thailand) Chonburi
19	DF	Natthaphong Samana	29 June 1984 (aged 22)		(Thailand) Krung Thai Bank
20	DF	Choketawee Promrut	16 March 1975 (aged 31)		(Malaysia) Johor
21	MF	Nirut Surasiang	20 February 1979 (aged 27)		(Vietnam) Pisico Bình Định
22	GK	Kittisak Rawangpa	3 January 1975 (aged 32)		(Thailand) TTM Phichit
23	FW	Pipat Thonkanya	4 January 1979 (aged 28)		(Thailand) BEC Tero Sasana
25	FW	Kwanchai Fuangprakob	28 May 1978 (aged 28)		(Thailand) TTM Phichit

=== Malaysia ===
Head coach: Norizan Bakar

No.	Pos.	Player	Date of birth (age)	Caps	Club
1	GK	Syamsuri Mustafa	6 February 1981 (aged 25)		(Malaysia) Terengganu
2	DF	Azizi Matt Rose	6 November 1981 (aged 25)		(Malaysia) PDRM
3	DF	Mohd Fauzi Nan	20 January 1980 (aged 26)		(Malaysia) Perlis
5	DF	Norhafiz Zamani	15 July 1981 (aged 25)		(Malaysia) Pahang
6	DF	V. Thirumurugan	9 January 1983 (aged 24)		(Malaysia) Kedah
7	DF	Kaironnisam Sahabudin (c)	10 May 1979 (aged 27)		(Malaysia) UPB-MyTeam
8	DF	Chan Wing Hoong	29 April 1977 (aged 29)		(Malaysia) Perak
10	MF	Hardi Jaafar	30 May 1979 (aged 27)		(Malaysia) Perak
11	FW	Nizaruddin Yusof	10 November 1979 (aged 27)		(Malaysia) Perlis
13	FW	Samransak Kram	10 November 1985 (aged 21)		(Malaysia) Kedah
14	FW	Khyril Muhymeen	10 May 1987 (aged 19)		(Malaysia) Kedah
15	DF	Irwan Fadzli	2 June 1981 (aged 25)		(Malaysia) UPB-MyTeam
16	MF	Eddy Helmi	8 December 1979 (aged 27)		(Malaysia) Johor
17	MF	K. Nanthakumar	13 October 1977 (aged 29)		(Malaysia) Perak
18	MF	Fadzli Saari	1 January 1983 (aged 24)		(Malaysia) Selangor
19	MF	Safiq Rahim	5 July 1987 (aged 19)		(Malaysia) Selangor
20	FW	Hairuddin Omar	29 September 1979 (aged 27)		(Malaysia) Pahang
21	GK	Azizon Abdul Kadir	10 June 1981 (aged 25)		(Malaysia) Negri Sembilan
23	MF	Rezal Zambery Yahya	10 October 1978 (aged 28)		(Malaysia) Negri Sembilan
25	MF	Shukor Adan	24 September 1979 (aged 27)		(Malaysia) Selangor

=== Myanmar ===
Head coach: U Sann Win

No.	Pos.	Player	Date of birth (age)	Caps	Club
1	GK	Aung Aung Oo	8 June 1982 (aged 24)		(Myanmar) Finance and Revenue
2	DF	Min Thu	5 April 1979 (aged 27)		(Myanmar) Ministry of Commerce
3	DF	Moe Win	29 March 1985 (aged 21)		(Myanmar) Kanbawza
4	DF	Zaw Linn Tun (c)	23 July 1983 (aged 23)		(Myanmar) Home Affairs
5	DF	Khin Maung Lwin	27 December 1982 (aged 24)		(Myanmar) Kanbawza
6	DF	Khin Maung Tun	12 October 1980 (aged 26)		(Myanmar) Finance and Revenue
7	DF	Aung Myo Thant	1 December 1984 (aged 22)		(Myanmar) Ministry of Commerce
8	FW	Aung Myint Aye	12 December 1985 (aged 21)		(Myanmar) Yangon City Development Committee
9	FW	Yan Paing	27 November 1983 (aged 23)		(Myanmar) Finance and Revenue
10	FW	Soe Myat Min	19 May 1982 (aged 24)		(Myanmar) Finance and Revenue
11	FW	Si Thu Win	1 December 1984 (aged 22)		(Myanmar) Home Affairs
12	DF	Zaw Htet Aung	5 November 1987 (aged 19)		(Myanmar) Ministry of Energy
13	DF	Aye San	24 January 1982 (aged 24)		(Myanmar)
14	MF	Kyaw Khine Win	23 December 1983 (aged 23)		(Myanmar) Ministry of Energy
15	MF	Yazar Win Thein	9 April 1986 (aged 20)		(Myanmar) Finance and Revenue
16	MF	Myo Min Tun	14 July 1983 (aged 23)		(Myanmar) Ministry of Commerce
17	MF	Soe Thiha Aung	12 December 1985 (aged 21)		(Myanmar) Ministry of Construction
18	GK	Kyaw Zin Htet	2 March 1982 (aged 24)		(Myanmar) Ministry of Sport and Cience
19	GK	Ko Ko Aung			(Myanmar) Banner Team
20	MF	Kyaw Thu Ya	10 December 1984 (aged 22)		(Myanmar) Finance and Revenue
21	FW	Kyaw Thi Ha	24 August 1986 (aged 20)		(Myanmar) Kanbawza
22	FW	Hla Aye Htwe	14 December 1988 (aged 18)		(Myanmar) Yangon City Development Committee

=== Philippines ===
Head coach: Jose Ariston Caslib

No.	Pos.	Player	Date of birth (age)	Caps	Club
1	GK	Michael Casas	12 March 1986 (aged 20)		(Philippines) San Beda College
2	DF	Phil Greatwich	21 January 1987 (aged 19)		(United States) Towson University
4	DF	Anton del Rosario	23 December 1981 (aged 25)		(Philippines) Kaya
5	DF	Johanne Sablon	25 July 1986 (aged 20)		(Philippines) San Beda College
6	MF	Anto Gonzales	1 May 1981 (aged 25)		(Philippines) Claret
7	FW	Ali Go	21 September 1976 (aged 30)		(Philippines) Kaya
8	MF	James Younghusband	4 September 1986 (aged 20)		(England) Staines Town
9	FW	Jan Benedict	22 March 1980 (aged 26)		(Philippines)
10	MF	Christopher Greatwich	30 September 1983 (aged 23)		(England) Lewes
11	MF	Jeffrey Liman	19 May 1984 (aged 22)		(Philippines) San Beda College
13	MF	Emelio Caligdong	8 September 1982 (aged 24)		(Philippines) Philippine Air Force
14	MF	Ariel Zerrudo	10 May 1981 (aged 25)		(Philippines) Lateo
16	MF	Arnie Pasinabo	4 February 1986 (aged 20)		(Philippines) University of St. La Salle
17	FW	Alvin Valeroso	25 April 1983 (aged 23)		(Philippines) Kaya
18	DF	Aly Borromeo (c)	28 June 1983 (aged 23)		(Philippines) Kaya
19	FW	Dan Padernal	17 May 1981 (aged 25)		(Philippines) Mendiola United
20	DF	Alvin Ocampo	5 August 1977 (aged 29)		(Philippines) Union Manila
21	MF	Henry Brauner	10 May 1984 (aged 22)		(United States) University of Arizona
22	GK	Archie Bayquin	4 November 1983 (aged 23)		(Philippines) University of St. La Salle
23	GK	Alvin Montañez	10 December 1983 (aged 23)		(Philippines) Silliman University
24	DF	Armand Del Rosario	8 December 1978 (aged 28)		(Philippines) Kaya
25	MF	Jerome Orcullo	9 May 1984 (aged 22)		(Philippines) San Beda College

== Group B ==
=== Singapore ===
Head coach: (Serbia) Raddy Avramovic

No.	Pos.	Player	Date of birth (age)	Caps	Club
1	GK	Hassan Sunny	2 April 1984 (aged 22)		(Singapore) Geylang United
2	MF	Ridhuan Muhammad	6 May 1984 (aged 22)		(Singapore) Tampines Rovers
3	DF	Ismail Yunos	24 October 1986 (aged 20)		(Singapore) Young Lions
4	MF	Isa Halim	15 May 1986 (aged 20)		(Singapore) Young Lions
5	DF	Aide Iskandar (c)	28 May 1975 (aged 31)		(Singapore) Geylang United
6	DF	Baihakki Khaizan	31 January 1984 (aged 22)		(Singapore) Young Lions
7	MF	Shi Jiayi	2 September 1983 (aged 23)		(Singapore) Home United
8	FW	Mohd Noh Alam Shah	3 September 1980 (aged 26)		(Singapore) Tampines Rovers
10	FW	Indra Sahdan	5 March 1979 (aged 27)		(Singapore) Home United
11	FW	Fazrul Nawaz	17 April 1985 (aged 21)		(Singapore) Young Lions
12	FW	Masrezwan Masturi	17 February 1981 (aged 25)		Singapore Armed Forces
13	DF	Hafiz Osman	15 February 1984 (aged 22)		Singapore Armed Forces
14	DF	Shunmugham Subramani	5 August 1972 (aged 34)		(Singapore) Home United
15	MF	Mustafic Fahrudin	17 April 1981 (aged 25)		(Singapore) Tampines Rovers
16	DF	Daniel Bennett	7 January 1978 (aged 29)		Singapore Armed Forces
17	MF	Shahril Ishak	23 January 1984 (aged 22)		(Singapore) Home United
18	GK	Lionel Lewis	16 December 1982 (aged 24)		(Singapore) Home United
19	FW	Khairul Amri	14 March 1985 (aged 21)		(Singapore) Young Lions
20	DF	Noh Rahman	2 August 1980 (aged 26)		(Singapore) Geylang United
21	DF	Precious Emuejeraye	21 March 1983 (aged 23)		(Singapore) Gombak United
22	FW	Itimi Dickson	14 November 1983 (aged 23)		(Indonesia) Persitara
30	GK	Fadhil Salim	24 January 1983 (aged 23)		(Singapore) Woodlands Wellington

=== Vietnam ===
Head coach: (Austria) Alfred Riedl

No.	Pos.	Player	Date of birth (age)	Caps	Club
1	GK	Bùi Quang Huy	24 July 1982 (aged 24)		(Vietnam) Nam Định
2	DF	Phùng Văn Nhiên	23 November 1982 (aged 24)		(Vietnam) Nam Định
3	DF	Nguyễn Huy Hoàng	4 January 1981 (aged 26)		(Vietnam) Sông Lam Nghệ An
4	DF	Nguyễn Minh Đức	14 September 1983 (aged 23)		(Vietnam) Sông Lam Nghệ An
5	DF	Nguyễn Văn Biển	27 April 1985 (aged 21)		(Vietnam) Nam Định
6	MF	Nguyễn Hữu Thắng	22 June 1980 (aged 26)		(Vietnam) XM Vinakansai Ninh Bình
7	DF	Vũ Như Thành	28 August 1981 (aged 25)		(Vietnam) Bình Dương
8	FW	Thạch Bảo Khanh	25 April 1979 (aged 27)		(Vietnam) Thể Công Viettel
9	FW	Lê Công Vinh	10 December 1985 (aged 21)		(Vietnam) Sông Lam Nghệ An
10	FW	Đặng Phương Nam	15 December 1976 (aged 30)		(Vietnam) Thể Công Viettel
11	MF	Lê Hồng Minh	15 September 1978 (aged 28)		(Vietnam) Đà Nẵng
12	MF	Nguyễn Minh Phương (c)	5 July 1980 (aged 26)		(Vietnam) Gạch Đồng Tâm Long An
14	MF	Lê Tấn Tài	4 January 1984 (aged 23)		(Vietnam) Khatoco Khánh Hòa
15	DF	Nguyễn Mạnh Dũng	12 March 1977 (aged 29)		(Vietnam) Hà Nội ACB
16	DF	Huỳnh Quang Thanh	10 October 1984 (aged 22)		(Vietnam) Bình Dương
17	MF	Nguyễn Vũ Phong	6 February 1985 (aged 21)		(Vietnam) Bình Dương
18	FW	Phan Thanh Bình	1 November 1986 (aged 20)		(Vietnam) Đồng Tháp
20	FW	Đặng Văn Thành	30 September 1984 (aged 22)		(Vietnam) Hải Phòng
21	MF	Nguyễn Minh Chuyên	9 November 1985 (aged 21)		(Vietnam) Sài Gòn Port
23	MF	Trần Đức Dương	2 May 1983 (aged 23)		(Vietnam) Nam Định
24	GK	Dương Hồng Sơn	20 November 1982 (aged 24)		(Vietnam) Sông Lam Nghệ An
25	GK	Nguyễn Thế Anh	21 September 1981 (aged 25)		(Vietnam) Bình Dương

=== Indonesia ===
Head coach: (England) Peter Withe

No.	Pos.	Player	Date of birth (age)	Caps	Club
1	GK	Hendro Kartiko	24 April 1973 (aged 33)		(Indonesia) Arema Malang
3	DF	Erol Iba	6 August 1979 (aged 27)		(Indonesia) Persik Kediri
4	DF	Ricardo Salampessy	18 February 1984 (aged 22)		(Indonesia) Persipura Jayapura
5	DF	Maman Abdurahman	12 May 1982 (aged 24)		(Indonesia) PSIS Semarang
6	DF	I Gusti Bayu Sutha	28 May 1977 (aged 29)		(Indonesia) Persib Bandung
7	MF	Eka Ramdani	18 June 1984 (aged 22)		(Indonesia) Persib Bandung
8	FW	Elie Aiboy	20 April 1979 (aged 27)		(Indonesia) Arema Malang
9	FW	Ilham Jaya Kesuma	19 September 1978 (aged 28)		(Indonesia) Persita Tangerang
11	MF	Ponaryo Astaman (c)	25 September 1979 (aged 27)		(Malaysia) Melaka TMFC
12	GK	Samsidar	15 July 1982 (aged 24)		(Indonesia) PSM Makassar
13	FW	Budi Sudarsono	19 September 1979 (aged 27)		(Indonesia) Persik Kediri
14	DF	Ismed Sofyan	28 August 1979 (aged 27)		(Indonesia) Persija Jakarta
15	DF	Ledi Utomo	13 June 1983 (aged 23)		(Indonesia) Persikota Tangerang
16	MF	Syamsul Chaeruddin	9 February 1983 (aged 23)		(Indonesia) PSM Makassar
17	FW	Atep Rizal	5 June 1985 (aged 21)		(Indonesia) Persija Jakarta
18	DF	Firmansyah	7 April 1980 (aged 26)		(Indonesia) Sriwijaya
19	FW	Zaenal Arief	3 January 1981 (aged 26)		(Indonesia) Persib Bandung
20	FW	Bambang Pamungkas	10 June 1980 (aged 26)		(Malaysia) Selangor
22	DF	Supardi Nasir	9 April 1983 (aged 23)		(Indonesia) PSMS Medan
23	DF	Mahyadi Panggabean	8 January 1982 (aged 25)		(Indonesia) PSMS Medan
24	FW	Saktiawan Sinaga	19 February 1982 (aged 24)		(Indonesia) PSMS Medan
25	MF	Agus Indra Kurniawan	7 February 1982 (aged 24)		(Indonesia) Persija Jakarta

=== Laos ===
Head coach: Saythong Syphasay

No.	Pos.	Player	Date of birth (age)	Caps	Club
1	GK	Sengphachan Bounthisanh	1 June 1987 (aged 19)		(Laos) Vientiane
2	DF	Soulivanh Rathsachack	28 September 1987 (aged 19)		(Laos) MCTPC
3	DF	Kovanh Namthavixay	23 July 1987 (aged 19)		(Laos) MCTPC
4	DF	Khamxay Phakasy	21 March 1986 (aged 20)		National University of Laos
5	FW	Souksamay Manhmanyvong	20 September 1986 (aged 20)		(Laos)
6	DF	Chandalaphone Liepvixay	14 April 1986 (aged 20)		(Laos) Lao-American College
7	MF	Sounthalay Saysongkham	21 August 1987 (aged 19)		National University of Laos
8	DF	Saynakhonevieng Phommapanya	28 October 1987 (aged 19)		(Laos) Vientiane
9	FW	Visay Phaphouvanin	12 June 1985 (aged 21)		(Laos) Vientiane
10	FW	Sola Sirivonghanh			(Laos)
11	DF	Keovisian Keovilay	1 November 1983 (aged 23)		(Laos)
12	MF	Phayvanh Lounglath	8 March 1983 (aged 23)		(Laos) Lao Army
13	DF	Kaysone Soukhavong	7 June 1987 (aged 19)		(Laos) Lao Banks
14	MF	Sonesavath Sayyasith			(Laos)
15	DF	Vongphet Sylisay	7 September 1988 (aged 18)		(Laos)
16	MF	Kita Sysavanh	19 June 1983 (aged 23)		(Malaysia) Johor
17	FW	Sathongyot Sisomphone	16 March 1984 (aged 22)		(Laos) Lao Army
18	GK	Phoutpasong Sengdalavong	1 March 1983 (aged 23)		(Laos) Kanlagna
19	MF	Soubandit Thammavong	9 October 1991 (aged 15)		(Laos)
20	MF	Dao Khotsaya	1 July 1990 (aged 16)		(Laos)
22	FW	Boo Syhalath			(Laos)
