= Football at the 2007 SEA Games – Men's team squads =

Below are the squads for the Football at the 2007 SEA Games, hosted by Thailand, which took place between 1 and 14 December 2007.

== Group A ==
=== Thailand ===
Coach: (Thailand) Thongsuk Sampahungsith

No.	Pos.	Player	Date of birth (age)	Caps	Club
1	GK	Weera Koedpudsa	1 July 1984 (aged 23)		(Thailand) Bangkok United
18	GK	Siwarak Tedsungnoen	20 April 1984 (aged 23)		(Thailand) Bangkok Bank
2	DF	Jeera Jarernsuk	18 May 1985 (aged 22)		(Thailand) Bangkok United
5	DF	Prat Samakrat	31 October 1985 (aged 22)		(Thailand) BEC Tero Sasana
6	DF	Chonlatit Jantakam	2 June 1985 (aged 22)		(Thailand) Chonburi F.C.
4	DF	Kiatprawut Saiwaeo	24 January 1986 (aged 21)		(England) Manchester City
	DF	Noppol Pitafai	1 February 1985 (aged 22)		(Thailand) BEC Tero Sasana
3	DF	Suttinan Phuk-hom	29 November 1987 (aged 20)		(Thailand) Nakhon Pathom
12	DF	Natthaphong Samana	29 June 1984 (aged 23)		(Thailand) Chonburi
11	MF	Tana Chanabut	6 June 1984 (aged 23)		(Thailand) PEA
19	MF	Wuttichai Tathong	11 April 1985 (aged 22)		(Thailand) Chula United
15	MF	Adul Lahsoh	19 September 1986 (aged 21)		(Thailand) Chonburi
7	MF	Ittipol Poolsap	8 April 1984 (aged 23)		(Thailand) PEA
8	MF	Apipoo Suntornpanavech	18 July 1986 (aged 21)		(Thailand) Osotspa
13	MF	Weerayut Jitkuntod	2 January 1984 (aged 23)		(Thailand) Tobacco Monopoly
16	MF	Arthit Sunthornpit	19 April 1986 (aged 21)		(Thailand) Chonburi
10	FW	Anon Sangsanoi	1 March 1984 (aged 23)		(Thailand) BEC Tero Sasana
20	FW	Sompong Soleb	30 June 1986 (aged 21)		(Thailand) Thai Port
9	FW	Teerasil Dangda	6 June 1988 (aged 19)		(Thailand) Muangthong United
14	FW	Teeratep Winothai	26 January 1985 (aged 22)		(Thailand) BEC Tero Sasana

=== Indonesia ===
Coach: (Bulgaria) Ivan Kolev

No.	Pos.	Player	Date of birth (age)	Caps	Club
1	GK	Dian Agus Prasetyo	3 August 1985 (aged 22)		(Indonesia) Pelita Jaya
23	GK	Muhammad Yasir	13 January 1985 (aged 22)		(Indonesia) Persikota Tangerang
15	DF	Achmad Jufriyanto	7 February 1987 (aged 20)		(Indonesia) Persita Tangerang
12	DF	Mohammad Nasuha	15 September 1984 (aged 23)		(Indonesia) Persikota Tangerang
2	DF	Purwaka Yudhi	11 April 1984 (aged 23)		(Indonesia) Deltras Sidoarjo
4	DF	Ricardo Salampessy	18 February 1984 (aged 23)		(Indonesia) Persipura Jayapura
6	DF	Tony Sucipto	12 February 1986 (aged 21)		(Indonesia) Sriwijaya F.C.
16	DF	Muhammad Roby	12 September 1985 (aged 22)		(Indonesia) Persija Jakarta
5	DF	Fandy Mochtar	19 May 1984 (aged 23)		(Indonesia) Persija Jakarta
7	MF	Eka Ramdani	18 June 1984 (aged 23)		(Indonesia) Persib Bandung
17	MF	Atep	5 June 1985 (aged 22)		(Indonesia) Persija Jakarta
8	MF	Hendra Ridwan	1 December 1985 (aged 22)		(Indonesia) Persmin Minahasa
20	MF	Imanuel Wanggai	23 February 1988 (aged 19)		(Indonesia) Persipura Jayapura
11	MF	Muhammad Bahtiar	26 October 1987 (aged 20)		(Indonesia) Persipura Jayapura
19	MF	Ahmad Bustomi	13 July 1985 (aged 22)		(Indonesia) Persema Malang
22	MF	Ardan Aras	2 March 1984 (aged 23)		(Indonesia) Pelita Jaya
14	MF	Arif Suyono	3 January 1984 (aged 23)		(Indonesia) Arema Malang
13	FW	Ian Kabes	14 May 1986 (aged 21)		(Indonesia) Persipura Jayapura
21	FW	Cornelius Geddy	25 June 1986 (aged 21)		(Indonesia) Persisam Putra Samarinda
9	FW	Airlangga Sutjipto	22 November 1985 (aged 22)		(Indonesia) Deltras Sidoarjo
10	FW	Jajang Mulyana	23 October 1988 (aged 19)		(Indonesia) Pelita Jaya

=== Myanmar ===
Head Coach: U San Win

No.	Pos.	Player	Date of birth (age)	Caps	Club
	GK	Kyaw Zin Htet	2 March 1990 (aged 17)		(Myanmar) Kanbawza
	GK	Kyaw Htay Oo			(Myanmar)
	DF	Moe Win	29 March 1985 (aged 22)		(Myanmar) Ministry of Commerce
	DF	Aye San	24 December 1988 (aged 18)		(Myanmar) Kanbawza
	DF	Zaw Htet Aung	5 November 1987 (aged 20)		(Myanmar) Kanbawza
	DF	Khin Maung Lwin	27 November 1982 (aged 25)		(Myanmar) Kanbawza
	DF	Myo Min Tun	14 July 1983 (aged 24)		(Myanmar) Ministry of Commerce
	DF	Tun Tun Win	15 December 1987 (aged 19)		(Myanmar) Finance and Revenue F.C.
	DF	Nay Win			(Myanmar)
	MF	Soe Thiha Aung	12 December 1988 (aged 18)		(Myanmar) Ministry of Construction
	MF	Aung Myo Thant	1 December 1984 (aged 23)		(Myanmar) Ministry of Commerce
	MF	Aung Myint Aye	12 December 1985 (aged 21)		(Myanmar) YCDC
	MF	Soe Lin Tun	12 December 1985 (aged 21)		(Myanmar) Finance and Revenue F.C.
	MF	Hein Kyaw Thu			(Myanmar)
	MF	Kyaw Thiha	24 August 1986 (aged 21)		(Myanmar) Kanbawza
	FW	Si Thu Win	1 December 1984 (aged 23)		(Myanmar) Home Affairs F.C.
	FW	Yazar Win Thein	9 April 1988 (aged 19)		(Myanmar) Finance and Revenue F.C.
	FW	Pai Soe	22 March 1987 (aged 20)		(Myanmar) Finance and Revenue F.C.

=== Cambodia ===
Coach: (Australia) Scott O'Donell

No.	Pos.	Player	Date of birth (age)	Caps	Club
	GK	Samreth Seiha	22 April 1990 (aged 17)		(Cambodia) National Defense Ministry
	GK	Pich Rovenyothin	15 May 1989 (aged 18)		(Cambodia) Nagacorp
	DF	Chan Dara	1 March 1986 (aged 21)		(Cambodia) Khemara Keila FC
	DF	Thul Sothearith	28 November 1985 (aged 22)		(Cambodia) Khemara Keila FC
	DF	Tieng Tiny	9 June 1986 (aged 21)		(Cambodia) Nagacorp
	DF	Sun Sovannarith	11 February 1985 (aged 22)		(Cambodia) Nagacorp
	DF	Ngoun Chansothea			(Cambodia)
	MF	Sopanha Sun	2 March 1985 (aged 22)		(Cambodia) Kampot FC
	MF	Thoun Soun			(Cambodia)
	MF	Keo Kosal	13 July 1986 (aged 21)		(Cambodia) National Defense Ministry
	MF	Chaya Chan	24 February 1987 (aged 20)		(Cambodia) Nagacorp
	MF	Sam Minar	27 March 1986 (aged 21)		(Cambodia) Phnom Penh Crown FC
	MF	Khim Borey	29 September 1989 (aged 18)		(Cambodia) National Defense Ministry
	MF	Sam El Nasa	25 May 1984 (aged 23)		(Cambodia) Military Police FC
	MF	Men Pisith			(Cambodia)
	MF	Hout Sokunthea	20 October 1990 (aged 17)		(Cambodia) National Defense Ministry
	FW	Sinuon Nuth	10 October 1985 (aged 22)		(Cambodia) Royal Sword F.C.
	FW	Chum Chin	7 October 1985 (aged 22)		(Cambodia) Phnom Penh Crown FC
	FW	Teab Vathanak	7 January 1985 (aged 22)		(Cambodia) Nagacorp
	FW	Kouch Sokumpheak	15 February 1987 (aged 20)		(Cambodia) Khemara Keila FC

== Group B ==
=== Vietnam ===
Coach: (Austria) Alfred Riedl

No.	Pos.	Player	Date of birth (age)	Caps	Club
	GK	Trần Đức Cường	20 May 1985 (aged 22)		(Vietnam) SHB Đà Nẵng
	GK	Tô Vĩnh Lợi	22 April 1985 (aged 22)		(Vietnam) Bình Định F.C.
	GK	Bùi Tấn Trường	9 February 1986 (aged 21)		(Vietnam) CLB Đồng Tháp
3	DF	Nguyễn Thành Long Giang	6 September 1988 (aged 19)		(Vietnam) Tiền Giang F.C.
	DF	Mai Xuân Hợp	14 December 1986 (aged 20)		(Vietnam) Thanh Hóa FC
	DF	Đoàn Việt Cường	1 January 1985 (aged 22)		(Vietnam) CLB Đồng Tháp
4	DF	Võ Nhật Tân	27 June 1987 (aged 20)		(Vietnam) Tiền Giang F.C.
	DF	Nguyễn Quý Sửu	18 October 1986 (aged 21)		(Vietnam) CLB Đồng Tháp
	DF	Phùng Công Minh	27 September 1985 (aged 22)		(Vietnam) Becamex Bình Dương FC
	DF	Huỳnh Quang Thanh	10 October 1984 (aged 23)		(Vietnam) Becamex Bình Dương FC
	MF	Nguyễn Vũ Phong	6 February 1985 (aged 22)		(Vietnam) Becamex Bình Dương FC
	MF	Võ Duy Nam	28 June 1986 (aged 21)		(Vietnam) Khatoco Khánh Hòa
	MF	Mai Tiến Thành	16 March 1986 (aged 21)		(Vietnam) Thanh Hóa FC
	MF	Nguyễn Anh Đức	24 October 1985 (aged 22)		(Vietnam) Becamex Bình Dương FC
	MF	Châu Phong Hòa	14 August 1985 (aged 22)		(Vietnam) CLB Đồng Tháp
	FW	Nguyễn Minh Chuyên	9 November 1985 (aged 22)		(Vietnam) Sài Gòn Port
	FW	Lê Công Vinh	10 December 1985 (aged 21)		(Vietnam) Sông Lam Nghệ An
	FW	Phan Thanh Bình	1 November 1986 (aged 21)		(Vietnam) CLB Đồng Tháp
	FW	Nguyễn Đại Đồng	5 September 1986 (aged 21)		(Vietnam) Thanh Hóa FC

=== Singapore ===
Coach: (Serbia) Raddy Avramovic

No.	Pos.	Player	Date of birth (age)	Caps	Club
1	GK	Hassan Sunny	2 April 1984 (aged 23)		(Singapore) Geylang United
	GK	Jasper Chan	7 November 1988 (aged 19)		(Singapore) Young Lions
	DF	Shahril Alias	14 May 1984 (aged 23)		(Singapore) Home United
13	DF	Hafiz Osman	15 February 1984 (aged 23)		(Singapore) SAFFC
6	DF	Baihakki Khaizan	31 January 1984 (aged 23)		(Singapore) Young Lions
22	DF	Juma'at Jantan	23 February 1984 (aged 23)		(Singapore) Home United
3	DF	Ismail Yunos	24 October 1986 (aged 21)		(Singapore) Young Lions
12	DF	Shaiful Esah	12 May 1986 (aged 21)		(Singapore) SAFFC
	DF	Sevki Sha’ban	2 May 1986 (aged 21)		(Singapore) Gombak United
	DF	Shariff Abdul Samat	5 January 1984 (aged 23)		(Singapore) Tampines Rovers
2	MF	Ridhuan Muhammad	6 May 1984 (aged 23)		(Singapore) Tampines Rovers
15	MF	Tengku Mushadad	7 August 1984 (aged 23)		(Singapore) Young Lions
4	MF	Isa Halim	15 May 1986 (aged 21)		(Singapore) Young Lions
	MF	Yasir Hanapi	21 June 1989 (aged 18)		(Singapore)
	MF	Hariss Harun	19 November 1990 (aged 17)		(Singapore) Young Lions
	MF	Erwan Gunawan	20 March 1987 (aged 20)		(Singapore) Young Lions
19	FW	Khairul Amri	14 March 1985 (aged 22)		(Singapore) Young Lions
11	FW	Fazrul Nawaz	17 April 1985 (aged 22)		(Singapore) Young Lions
17	FW	Shahril Ishak	23 January 1984 (aged 23)		(Singapore) Home United
21	FW	Agu Casmir	23 March 1984 (aged 23)		(Singapore) Gombak United

=== Malaysia ===
Coach: B. Sathianathan

No.	Pos.	Player	Date of birth (age)	Caps	Club
1	GK	Syed Adney	29 November 1986 (aged 21)		(Malaysia) UPB-MyTeam
12	GK	Farizal Marlias	29 June 1986 (aged 21)		(Malaysia) Shahzan Muda
3	DF	S. Subramaniam	31 August 1985 (aged 22)		(Malaysia) UPB-MyTeam
4	DF	Bunyamin Umar	7 January 1988 (aged 19)		(Malaysia) UPB-MyTeam
16	DF	Syamsol Sabtu	30 August 1985 (aged 22)		(Malaysia) Negeri Sembilan
5	DF	Tengku Qayyum	5 March 1986 (aged 21)		(Malaysia) Negeri Sembilan
6	DF	Chun Keng Hong	25 October 1985 (aged 22)		(Malaysia) Penang
7	DF	Aidil Zafuan	3 August 1987 (aged 20)		(Malaysia) Negeri Sembilan
19	DF	Sumardi Hajalan	12 January 1985 (aged 22)		(Malaysia) Johor FC
8	MF	Zaquan Adha	3 August 1987 (aged 20)		(Malaysia) Negeri Sembilan
15	MF	Daudsu Jamaluddin	18 March 1985 (aged 22)		(Malaysia) Johor FC
13	MF	Asaph D	25 November 1986 (aged 21)		(Malaysia) Kedah
14	MF	Khyril Muhymeen	9 May 1987 (aged 20)		(Malaysia) Kedah
10	MF	Safiq Rahim	5 July 1987 (aged 20)		(Malaysia) Selangor
17	MF	Shahurain Abu Samah	23 December 1986 (aged 20)		(Malaysia) Negeri Sembilan
2	MF	Azi Shahril Azmi	20 September 1985 (aged 22)		(Malaysia) Perlis
18	FW	Safee Sali	29 January 1984 (aged 23)		(Malaysia) Selangor
9	FW	Amirul Hadi	27 May 1986 (aged 21)		(Malaysia) Selangor
20	FW	Norshahrul Idlan	8 June 1986 (aged 21)		(Malaysia) UPB-MyTeam
11	FW	Nor Farhan Muhammad	19 December 1984 (aged 22)		(Malaysia) PDRM

=== Laos ===
Coach: (Laos) Saysana Savatdy

No.	Pos.	Player	Date of birth (age)	Caps	Club
22	GK	Toulakham Sitthidaphone	19 October 1986 (aged 21)		(Laos) Lao Army
	GK	Phoutpasong Sengdalavong	1 March 1983 (aged 24)		(Laos) Kanlagna F.C.
	GK	Souvanpheng Phanthavong			(Laos)
3	DF	Kitsada Thongkhen	8 April 1987 (aged 20)		(Laos) Lao Army
6	DF	Chandalaphone Liemvisay	14 April 1986 (aged 21)		(Laos) Vientiane
	DF	Saynakhonevieng Phommapanya	28 October 1987 (aged 20)		(Laos) Vientiane
	DF	Kaysowe Souxhavong	7 June 1987 (aged 20)		(Laos) Lao Bank FC
	DF	Vongphet Sylisay	3 June 1989 (aged 18)		(Laos) Savannakhet F.C.
	MF	Sayyaboun Viengsavanh	3 June 1989 (aged 18)		(Laos)
	MF	Sayyameuang Many			(Laos)
	MF	Lamnao Singto	15 April 1988 (aged 19)		(Thailand) Kasetsart F.C.
	MF	Khotsaya Dao	12 July 1985 (aged 22)		(Laos) Lao-American College F.C.
	FW	Souksamay Manhmanyvong	20 September 1986 (aged 21)		(Laos)
	FW	Visay Phaphouvanin	12 June 1985 (aged 22)		(Laos) Vientiane
	FW	Vilasack Phothilath	12 February 1984 (aged 23)		(Laos) Lao-American College F.C.
	FW	Phetsamay Thongmany			(Laos)
	FW	Voradeth Minaphong			(Laos)
	FW	Khampheng Sayavutthi	19 July 1986 (aged 21)		(Laos) Yotha F.C.
