= 2005 Vietnamese football match-fixing scandal =

Football match scandal

Myanmar U-23 vs Vietnam U-23
Bacolod scandal Shame of Bacolod
- Event: 2005 SEA Games men's football Group B Third round
Myanmar U-23	Vietnam U-23
(Myanmar)	(Vietnam)
0	1
- Date: 24 November 2005
- Venue: Paglaum Stadium, Bacolod, Philippines
- Referee: Thatsokon (Thailand)

The 2005 Vietnamese football match-fixing scandal, also known as the "Disgrace of Bacolod" or the Bacolod scandal, occurred during the Vietnam under-23 football team vs. Myanmar under-23 football team match on 24 November 2005, in the third round of the 2005 SEA Games Men's football event in Bacolod, Philippines.

Several Vietnamese players were found to have intentionally underperformed in exchange for payments from a gambling syndicate, leading to criminal charges and suspensions. This scandal also had a negative effect on Vietnamese football, especially concerning football betting and match-fixing.

== Background ==
After losing to the Thailand U-23 team in the 2003 SEA Games finals, The Vietnam U-23 team participated in the 2005 SEA Games as the defending runner-up. To prepare for the tournament, the team competed in the LG Cup and the Agribank Cup friendly tournaments and successfully won both.

The Myanmar U-23 team had reached the semi-finals and finished fourth in the 2003 SEA Games. They were regarded as a potential dark horse in the 2005 edition.

Group B after the second round
Pos	Team	Pld	W	D	L	GF	GA	GD	Pts	Qualification
1	Vietnam	2	2	0	0	10	3	+7	6	Advance to knockout stage
2	Laos	2	1	0	1	5	10	−5	3	Advance to knockout stage
3	Indonesia	1	0	1	0	0	0	0	1	
4	Myanmar	2	0	1	1	2	3	−1	1	
5	Singapore	1	0	0	1	1	2	−1	0	

== Match-fixing plans ==
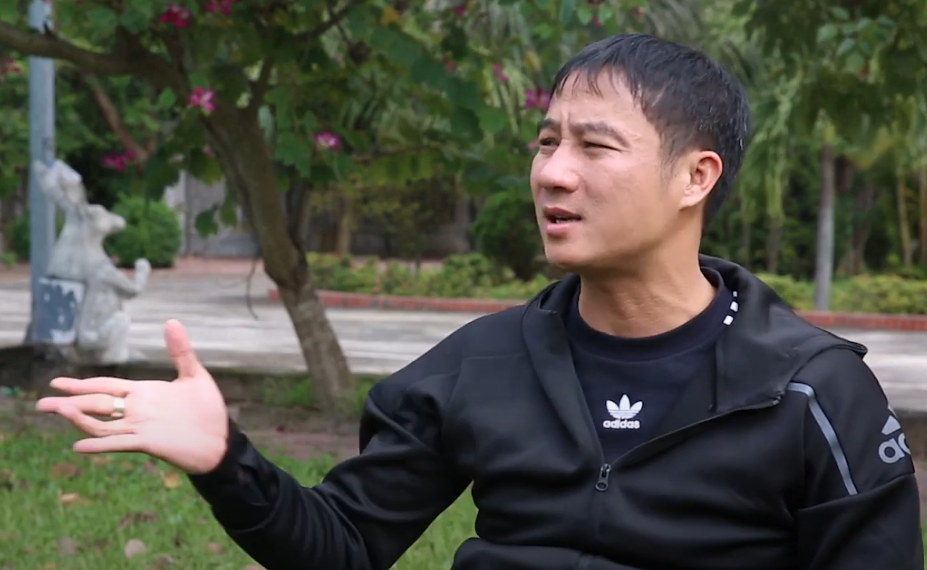
Lê Quốc Vượng, the initiator of the conspiracy, in 2019

On 21 November 2005, player Lê Quốc Vượng contacted former Vietnam national football team players Trương Tấn Hải and Lý Quốc Kỳ to discuss fixing the match between Vietnam U-23 and Myanmar U-23.

On the afternoon of 24 November, before the match, Lê Quốc Vượng met with eight players (Trần Hải Lâm, Lê Văn Trương, Lê Bật Hiếu, Châu Lê Phước Vĩnh, Lê Tấn Tài, Phan Văn Tài Em, Phạm Văn Quyến, and Huỳnh Quốc Anh) in a private hotel room. Lê Quốc Vượng proposed that if Vietnam won against Myanmar by exactly one goal, a local betting ring would give them 20 to 30 million VND (around $1,000 USD) and suggested that each player also place a bet of 20 to 30 million VND.

Almost all of the players agreed, except for Phan Văn Tài Em, who refused to participate and reported the plan to assistant coach Lê Thụy Hải and interpreter Trần Hùng Cường. Lê Tấn Tài also stated, "I can help the team win, but I don't want to get involved in the betting."

Lê Quốc Vượng informed Trương Tấn Hải that the players have agreed to the deal, and told him to set up the betting and sort out the odds for the players involved. He mentioned that seven players had agreed to participate and placed a bet of 250 million VND.

=== Match results ===
Vietnam started the match strong. However, midway through the first half, Myanmar changed their strategy, applying greater pressure on Vietnam. Nevertheless, the first half ended with no goals from either team.

In the second half, Vietnam improved their performance, holding off Myanmar's offense. In the 65th minute, Nguyễn Văn Biển was substituted in place of Huỳnh Quốc Anh and quickly made an impact. Just a minute later, he delivered a cross into the penalty area, allowing Phan Văn Tài Em to score with a header, giving Vietnam the lead in the 66th minute. As previously agreed, the Vietnamese players started to hold onto the ball in their half to waste time. The game ended with Vietnam winning 1–0.

24 November 2005
18:30 (UTC+08:00)

Myanmar U-23	0–1	Vietnam U-23
	Detail; Details on VFF	Phan Văn Tài Em 66'

Paglaum Stadium, Bacolod
Referee: Thatsokon (Thailand)

The match result triggered the promised payments, with Lê Quốc Vượng winning a bet of 250 million VND. On 26 November 2005, He contacted his girlfriend, Phạm Thị Cẩm Lai, a flight attendant, to meet with Trương Tấn Hải and collect the money. In total, Vượng received approximately 490 million VND, which included $25,000 (around 400 million VND at the time) and an additional 90 million VND. The sum was less than Lê Quốc Vượng's transfer value that year.

Of the collected funds, broker Lý Quốc Kỳ sent 240 million VND to the players involved in the match-fixing, with the remaining winnings going to Lê Quốc Vượng. Upon returning to Ho Chi Minh City on 5 December, he distributed 20 million VND each to players Phạm Văn Quyến, Lê Bật Hiếu, and Huỳnh Quốc Anh, who allocated another 20 million VND for Châu Lê Phước Vĩnh. Lê Văn Trương and Trần Hải Lâm chose not to accept any of the illicit payments out of shame.

== Investigation ==
Before the semi-final match between Vietnam U-23 and Malaysia U-23, officials found signs of possible match-fixing. This led to an investigation by the General Department of Security and the Ministry of Public Security in Vietnam. Authorities intercepted a phone conversation involving a reporter allegedly acting as a broker. On 2 December, the head of security for the Vietnam national football team warned several players, including Phạm Văn Quyến and Trần Hải Lâm, about the situation. During that time, some national team players had reported their concerns to the investigation agency, believing that certain players on the U-23 team were match-fixing, suspecting so because the team did not perform to their full potential in the match.

On 12 December, Phạm Xuân Quắc, the Director General of the Criminal Investigation Department of Social Order, summoned ten of the team's players. Investigators believed Lê Quốc Vượng was the initiator of the conspiracy. On 20 December, police discovered stashes of money at the homes of Lê Quốc Vượng and Phạm Văn Quyến.

In response to these concerns, Vietnamese Prime Minister Phan Văn Khải ordered an investigation into the actions of Vietnamese players. The Vietnam Football Federation was also asked to review the situation. Their analysis of video footage from the match concluded that the actions of some players were connected to match-fixing.

== Trial ==
This case was tried by the Ho Chi Minh City People's Court on 25 January 2007 and appealed on 20 April 2007. Lê Quốc Vượng and Trương Tấn Hải were sentenced to prison, while the other players were given suspended sentences due to mitigating circumstances.

Accused	Accusations	Sentences	Ref
Lê Quốc Vượng	Organized betting; Betting; Match-fixing	4 years in prison (original 6 years); 5-year ban from football activities; 15,000,000₫ fine (577.46$)	
Trương Tấn Hải	Organized betting	3 years in prison; 5,000,000₫ fine ($192.49)	
Phạm Văn Quyến Lê Văn Trương	Betting; Match-fixing	4-year ban from football activities; 2 years suspended sentence; 2 years of probation; 5,000,000₫ fine ($192.49)	
Trần Hải Lâm Châu Lê Phước Vĩnh	Betting; Match-fixing	3-years ban from football activities; 2-years suspended sentence; 2 years of probation; 5,000,000₫ fine ($192.49)	
Lê Bật Hiếu Huỳnh Quốc Anh	Betting; Match-fixing	3-year ban from football activities; 2-year and 6 months suspended sentence; 3 years of probation; 5,000,000₫ fine ($192.49)	

All players were ordered to return the 490 million VND obtained through match-fixing and were fined 5 million VND each. One of the individuals involved, Lý Quốc Kỳ, chose to turn himself in to the police on 11 July 2008 and also received a fine of 10 million VND. Additionally, two other individuals, Lê Thụy Hải and Trần Hùng Cường, faced disciplinary actions for their involvement. FIFA banned all seven players from participating in competitions in other countries.
