= Zulkifli (name) =

Zulkifli is both a given name and a surname. Notable people with the name include:

- Zulkifli Abbas (born 1956), Malaysian field hockey player
- Zulkifli Abdhir (born 1966), Malaysian terrorist
- Zulkifli Che Ros, (born 1985), Malaysian weightlifter
- Zulkifli Hasan (born 1962), Indonesian politician
- Zulkifli Noordin (born 1962), Malaysian politician
- Zulkifli Syukur (born 1984), Indonesian footballer
- Farah Asyikin binti Zulkifli (born 1979), Malaysian singer
- Masagos Zulkifli (born 1963), Singaporean politician
- Shalin Zulkifli (born 1978), Malaysian bowler

== See also ==
- Ahmad Zulkifli Lubis (born 1971), Indonesian voice actor
- Mohd Zulkifli Affendi Mohd Zakri (born 1982), Malaysian footballer
- Mohd Zulkifli Yusof (born 1982), Malaysian footballer
