= Valeriy Vdovin =

Russian footballer and manager

Personal information
- Full name: Valeriy Sergeyvich Vdovin
- Date of birth: 1950
- Place of birth: Russian SSR

Senior career*
Years	Team	Apps	(Gls)
1972–1982	Moskvich Moscow		

Managerial career
- 2005: Laos
- 2005–2009: Laos U23
- 2007–2008: Laos
- * Club domestic league appearances and goals

Valeriy Vdovin (Russian Cyrillic: Валерий Вдовин) is a Russian football manager who took the Laos U23 to the 2005 AFF U-23 Youth Championship. He also managed the Laos U23 team in preparation for the 2009 SEA Games.

== Laos ==
Under Vdovin, Laos rose 28 places in the FIFA World Rankings, to 162nd place, a position seemingly insurmountable to minnow nations. They finished seventh in the 2007 Tiger Cup and 2008 AFF Suzuki Cup with Vdovin in charge.
