= Dominique Fernandez (football manager) =

French football manager and scout

Personal information
- Date of birth: 1951 or 1952 (age 74–75)
- Place of birth: France

Managerial career
- Years: Team
- JS Suresnes
- 2001–2002: FC Villepinte
- 2003: Laos
- 2003–2004: Laos U-23
- 2004: Hải Phòng F.C.

Dominique Fernandez (born c. 1951–1952) is a French former football coach and scout. He was managing the Laos national football team and Hải Phòng F.C..

== Managerial career ==
Prior to his international managerial career, Fernandez worked extensively in the Île-de-France (Paris) region. He held various positions at Paris FC and Levallois SC. He spent over three seasons as the Sporting Director for FC Villepinte, where he was appointed head coach of the first team (Division d'Honneur Régionale) in 2001, arriving from JS Suresnes where he had also coached. He joined the recruitment department of RC Lens in July 2002, staying until March 2003 when he left for Asia.

=== Laos ===
Assuming the role of head coach for the Laos national football team in April 2003, Fernandez was contacted by an official from the Lao Football Federation who informed the French coach that they had been tracking him since 1998 and offered him the job. Adapting quickly to his new role, Fernandez served as head coach of the Laos U23 as well, directing them at the 2003 Southeast Asian Games. His contract with the U23 team ended in January 2004.

=== Haiphong FC ===
Following his time in Laos, Fernandez moved to Vietnam. In March 2004, he was appointed manager of the Mitsustar Haiphong F.C. U21 team. On April 26, 2004, he was appointed manager of the first team, competing in the V.League 1. During the 2004 season, the club narrowly avoided relegation, finishing 10th out of 12 teams. He was replaced by Luis Alberto for the 2005 campaign.

=== Return to scouting ===
Fernandez returned to France to join AS Saint-Étienne as a scout in May 2006, a position he held until September 2011. It was during this period that he identified Allan Saint-Maximin when the player was only ten years old and brought him to the Saint-Étienne academy.

=== Later career ===
Reports in 2011 linked Fernandez to the Haiti national football team. Then-manager Edson Tavares reportedly recommended Fernandez to the Haitian Football Federation to monitor and scout Haitian players based in Europe. This role was later confirmed, as he was officially named a representative of the federation to assist Tavares in assessing players in Europe ahead of the 2014 World Cup qualifiers.
