= Kita Sysavanh =

Laotian footballer

Personal information
- Full name: Kita Sysavanh
- Date of birth: 19 June 1983 (age 43)
- Place of birth: Vientiane, Laos
- Height: 1.78 m (5 ft 10 in)
- Position: Midfielder

Senior career*
Years	Team	Apps	(Gls)
2004–2006	PSS Sleman	20	(1)
2006–2008	Johor FA	10	(0)
2008–2014	Panama City Pirates	15	(0)
2014–	Lao Army F.C.		

International career
2007	Laos	2	(0)
- * Club domestic league appearances and goals

Kita Sysavanh (born 19 June 1983) is a former Lao professional football player who played as an attacking midfielder.

He is known for his long-range shooting, crossing and passing. Sysavanh made his debut for Laos in 2007 and has since become a mainstay in the Laos midfield.

== International career ==
Sysavanh made his debut for Laos in 2007 and was a part of the team that successfully attempted to qualify for the 2007 ASEAN Football Championship.
