= Saythong Syphasay =

Laotian professional football manager

Personal information
- Date of birth: ?
- Place of birth: Laos

Managerial career
- Years: Team
- 2003–2004: Laos
- 2006–2007: Laos

Saythong Syphasay is a Laotian professional football manager.

== Career ==
Since October 2003 until October 2004 he coached the Laos national football team. Also since October 2006 until 2007 he again works as manager of the Laos team.
