= I Gusti Bayu Sutha =

Indonesian footballer

Bayu Sutha
Personal information
- Full name: I Gusti Ngurah Agung Bayu Sutha
- Date of birth: 28 May 1977 (age 49)
- Place of birth: Gianyar, Indonesia
- Height: 1.80 m (5 ft 11 in)
- Position: Defender

Senior career*
Years	Team	Apps	(Gls)
1997–1999	Perseden Denpasar		
1999–2003	Persegi Gianyar		
2004	Pelita Krakatau Steel		
2005–2006	Persema Malang		
2007	Persib Bandung		
2008–2009	Deltras Sidoarjo		
2009–2010	Persiram Raja Ampat		
2010–2012	Mitra Kukar		

International career
2006–2007	Indonesia	4	(1)
- * Club domestic league appearances and goals

I Gusti Ngurah Bayu Sutha (born 28 May 1977 in Gianyar, Bali) is an Indonesian former footballer. He normally plays as a defender for the Indonesia national football team, normally people call him Bayu or Bayu Sutha. In the Asian Cup 2007 he was just used as a reserve player if another player from the starting squad was injured, especially if they were a defensive player.

== Personal life ==
His parents' names are I Gusti Ngurah Bagus (father) and Ni Gusti Ayu Rai Puspawati (mother). He is currently the only Balinese to represent Indonesia national team. His idol is Paolo Maldini and his favourite music is pop. Bayu Sutha was born into an artist family and he has artistic talent like his brothers. His parents wanted him to be an artist, but he often escaped and choose playing football.
