= Vongphet Sylisay =

Laotian footballer

Personal information
- Full name: Vongphet Sylisay
- Date of birth: 7 September 1988 (age 38)
- Height: 1.72 m (5 ft 8 in)
- Position: Midfielder

Senior career*
Years	Team	Apps	(Gls)
2008	Phongsali FC		
2009–2011	Savannakhet F.C.		
2012–2016	Lao Army		

International career^{‡}
2008–	Laos	13	(1)
- * Club domestic league appearances and goals ‡ National team caps and goals as of 20 March 2016

Vongphet Sylisay (born 7 September 1988) is a former Laotian footballer who played for Laos at the 2008 AFF Suzuki Cup and the 2007 Southeast Asian Games.
