= Nguyễn Mạnh Dũng (footballer, born 1977) =

Vietnamese footballer (born 1977)

Nguyễn Mạnh Dũng (born 1977) is a Vietnamese former footballer who played as a defender.

== Early life ==
He is the son of Vietnamese footballer Nguyễn Trọng Giáp.

== Career ==
He played for Vietnamese side The Cong-Viettel FC, helping the club win the league.

== Personal life ==
He has been nicknamed "Dũng Giáp".
