= Lê Bật Hiếu =

Vietnamese footballer (born 1984)

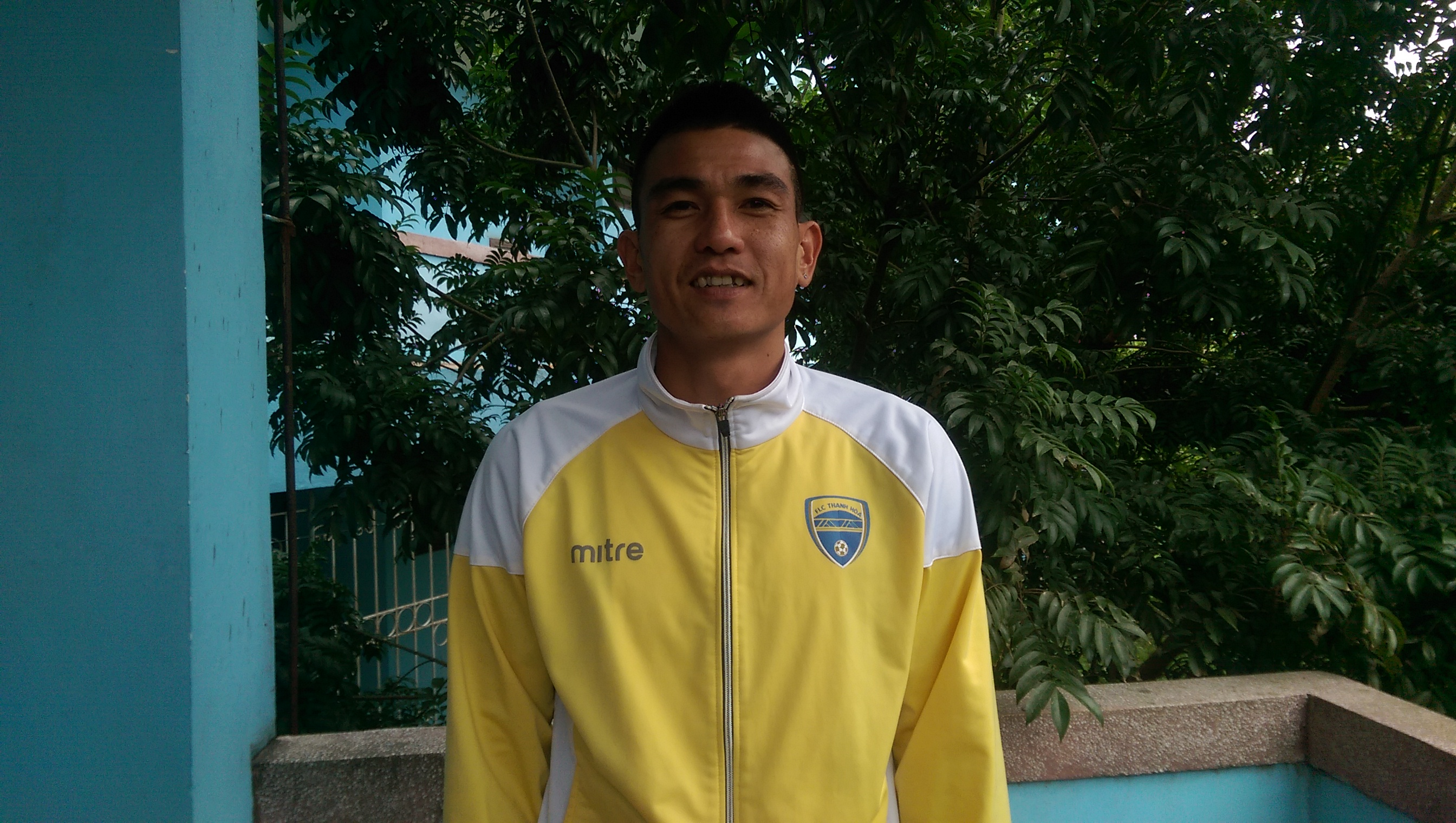
- Hiếu in 2017

Personal information
- Full name: Lê Bật Hiếu
- Date of birth: August 22, 1984 (age 42)
- Place of birth: Triệu Sơn, Thanh Hóa, Vietnam
- Height: 1.83 m (6 ft 0 in)
- Position: Centre-back

Youth career
- 1995–2003: Vicem Hải Phòng

Senior career*
Years	Team	Apps	(Gls)
2004–2011	Vicem Hải Phòng	43	(3)
2012–2013	FLC Thanh Hóa	37	(1)
2014–2016	Than Quảng Ninh	38	(0)
2016–2017	FLC Thanh Hóa	29	(0)
2017	Tây Ninh	3	(1)
2017–2018	Phố Hiến	4	(0)

International career^{‡}
2004–2007	Vietnam U23	1	(0)
2006–2013	Vietnam	2	(0)
- * Club domestic league appearances and goals as of 8 April 2017 ‡ National team caps and goals as of 23 June 2012

Lê Bật Hiếu (born 22 August 1984) is a Vietnamese retired footballer who played as a centre-back. He was called up to Vietnam national football team in 2012.
