= Aung Myint Aye =

Burmese footballer

Personal information
- Full name: Aung Myint Aye
- Date of birth: June 3, 1988 (age 38)
- Place of birth: Mandalay (Myanmar)
- Height: 1.73 m (5 ft 8 in)
- Position: Midfielder

Senior career*
Years	Team	Apps	(Gls)
2004–2009	Yangon City D.C.		
2009–2010	Magwe	16	(0)
2010–2015	Yadanarbon	123	(0)

International career
2006–2015	Myanmar	27	(0)
- * Club domestic league appearances and goals

Aung Myint Aye (Burmese: အောင်မြင့်အေး; born 12 December 1985) is a footballer from Myanmar. He made his first appearance for the Myanmar national football team in 2006.

== International ==
In 2007, he represented the Myanmar U-23s team in the final of 2007 SEA Games, losing to Thailand.
