= Thirumurugan Veeran =

Malaysian footballer

V. Thirumurugan
Personal information
- Full name: Thirumurugan a/l Veeran
- Date of birth: 9 January 1983 (age 43)
- Place of birth: Gurun, Kedah, Malaysia
- Height: 1.76 m (5 ft 9 1/2 in)
- Position: Right-back

Senior career*
Years	Team	Apps	(Gls)
2005	Kedah FA	8	(0)
2005–2006	Perak FA	22	(1)
2006–2012	Kedah FA	49	(7)
2012–2013	Perak FA	34	(0)
2014–2015	PDRM FA	18	(0)
2016–2017	Perlis FA	0	(0)

International career^{‡}
2005	Malaysia U-23	8	(10)
2006–2007	Malaysia	7	(0)
- * Club domestic league appearances and goals as of January 06, 2016 ‡ National team caps and goals as of January 06, 2016

Thirumurugan Veeran (born on 9 January 1983), also known as V. Thirumurugan, is a Malaysian retired footballer. He also a member of the Malaysia national football team.

He made his national début at the 2005 Manila Sea Games, which Malaysia won the bronze medal in the football event. He then made his senior debut against New Zealand on 19 February 2006.

He previously played for Perak, but was not retained. This paved the way for him to rejoined his home team, Kedah. He was an instrumental figure in helping Kedah won the 'double treble' championship (League, FA Cup and Malaysia Cup) in 2007 and 2008. He played with Kedah for six seasons, before returning to Perak for the 2013 season.

For the 2014 season, he joined PDRM FA. Two years later, he joined Perlis FA.

== Honours ==
=== Kedah FA ===
- Malaysia Cup (2) : 2007, 2008
- Malaysia FA Cup (2) : 2007, 2008
- Malaysia Super League (2) : 2007, 2008
