= Aung Myo Thant =

Burmese footballer

Personal information
- Full name: Aung Myo Thant
- Date of birth: May 5, 1983 (age 43)
- Place of birth: Rangun (Myanmar)
- Height: 1.68 m (5 ft 6 in)
- Position: Midfielder

Senior career*
Years	Team	Apps	(Gls)
2005–2009	Ministry of Commerce		
2009–2010	Zeyashwemye FC	17	(0)
2010–2015	Kanbawza FC	126	(0)

International career
2006–2015	Myanmar	27	(0)
- * Club domestic league appearances and goals

Aung Myo Thant (Burmese: အောင်မျိုးသန့်;born 1 December 1984) is a footballer from Myanmar. He made his first appearance for the Myanmar national football team in 2006.

== International ==
In 2007, he represented the Myanmar U-23s team in the final of 2007 SEA Games, losing to Thailand.
