= Lê Văn Trương =

Vietnamese footballer (born 1983)

Personal information
- Full name: Lê Văn Trương
- Date of birth: February 20, 1983 (age 43)
- Place of birth: Phú Vang, Thừa Thiên Huế, Vietnam
- Height: 1.72 m (5 ft 8 in)
- Position: Defender

Youth career
- 1996–2001: Huế

Senior career*
| Years | Team | Apps | (Gls) |
| 2002–2006 | Huế | 136 | (14) |
| 2007–2013 | Hoàng Anh Gia Lai | 168 | (13) |
| 2014–2015 | XSKT Cần Thơ | 17 | (1) |

International career
| 2003–2005 | Vietnam U23 | 18 | (0) |
| 2010–2011 | Vietnam | 3 | (0) |
- * Club domestic league appearances and goals

Lê Văn Trương (born 20 February 1983) is a retired Vietnamese footballer who played as a defender. He was a member of the Vietnam national team.
