= Nguyễn Quý Sửu =

Vietnamese footballer

Personal information
- Full name: Nguyễn Quý Sửu
- Date of birth: October 18, 1986 (age 40)
- Place of birth: Lai Vung, Đồng Tháp, Vietnam
- Height: 1.69 m (5 ft 7 in)
- Position: Midfielder

Youth career
- 1996–2003: Đồng Tháp

Senior career*
Years	Team	Apps	(Gls)
2004–2010	Đồng Tháp	138	(27)
2011–2014	Hoàng Anh Gia Lai	37	(5)
2015–2016	FLC Thanh Hóa	13	(0)
2017–2021	Đồng Tháp	62	(27)

International career
2004–2007	Vietnam U23	7	(0)
- * Club domestic league appearances and goals

Nguyễn Quý Sửu (born 18 October 1986) is a Vietnamese footballer who plays as a defensive midfielder for V.League 2 club Đồng Tháp He has played in 45 games and is now retired from official competition. Nguyễn Quý Sửu played for Hoàng Anh Gia Lai from 2011-2014, FLC Thanh Hóa from 2014-2016 and Long An FC since 2017.
