= Ledi Utomo =

Indonesian footballer (born 1983)

Personal information
- Full name: Ledi Utomo
- Date of birth: 13 June 1983 (age 43)
- Place of birth: Tangerang, Indonesia
- Height: 1.83 m (6 ft 0 in)
- Position: Defender

Senior career*
Years	Team	Apps	(Gls)
2005–2007	Persita Tangerang	28	(0)
2007–2009	Persikota Tangerang	34	(0)
2009–2010	Persitara North Jakarta	21	(0)
2010–2011	Batavia Union	18	(1)
2011–2012	PSMS Medan	12	(0)
2013–2014	Persita Tangerang	33	(0)
2015–2016	Persiba Balikpapan	15	(1)
2017	PSCS Cilacap	0	(0)
2017–2019	Persita Tangerang	40	(0)

International career
2004–2005	Indonesia U23		
2007	Indonesia	2	(0)
- * Club domestic league appearances and goals

Ledi Utomo (born 13 June 1983) is an Indonesian former footballer who plays as a defender.

== Club statistics ==
Club	Season	Super League		Premier Division		Piala Indonesia		Total	
Club	Season	Apps	Goals	Apps	Goals	Apps	Goals	Apps	Goals
Persitara North Jakarta	2009–10	21	0	-		3	0	24	0
PSMS Medan	2011–12	12	0	-		-		12	0
Total		33	0	-		3	0	36	0
