= Souksamay Manhmanyvong =

Laotian footballer

Personal information
- Full name: Souksamay Manhmanyvong
- Date of birth: September 20, 1986 (age 40)
- Place of birth: Laos
- Position: Forward

International career^{‡}
Years	Team	Apps	(Gls)
2007	Laos	2	(0)
- ‡ National team caps and goals as of 30 December 2012

Souksamay Manhmanyvong is a Laotian footballer who plays as a forward.
