= Trần Hải Lâm =

Vietnamese footballer

Personal information
- Full name: Trần Hải Lâm
- Date of birth: July 4, 1982 (age 44)
- Place of birth: Tiên Du, Bắc Ninh, Vietnam
- Height: 1.80 m (5 ft 11 in)
- Position: Centre-back

Youth career
- 1993–2002: Hà Nội ACB

Senior career*
Years	Team	Apps	(Gls)
2003–2005	Hoàng Anh Gia Lai		
2008–2016	SHB Đà Nẵng		

International career
2002–2005	Vietnam U23	3	(0)
2004–2009	Vietnam	2	(0)
- * Club domestic league appearances and goals

Trần Hải Lâm (born 4 July 1982) is a retired Vietnamese footballer who played as a centre-back for V-League club SHB Đà Nẵng. He was called up to Vietnam national football team in 2004.
