= Châu Lê Phước Vĩnh =

Vietnamese footballer (born 1985)

Personal information
- Full name: Châu Lê Phước Vĩnh
- Date of birth: June 22, 1985 (age 41)
- Place of birth: Đà Nẵng, Vietnam
- Height: 1.80 m (5 ft 11 in)
- Position: Centre-back

Youth career
- 1999–2007: SHB Đà Nẵng

Senior career*
Years	Team	Apps	(Gls)
2008–2016	SHB Đà Nẵng	139	(4)
2016–2017	Hồ Chí Minh City	12	(0)
2018–2020	Long An	52	(3)

International career^{‡}
2005–2007	Vietnam U23	6	(0)
2008–2017	Vietnam	10	(0)
- * Club domestic league appearances and goals as of 8 April 2017 ‡ National team caps and goals as of 5 March 2014

Châu Lê Phước Vĩnh (born 22 June 1985) is a Vietnamese retired footballer who played as a centre-back. He capped 10 times for the Vietnam national football team between 2008 and 2017.
