= Ministry of Construction =

Ministry of Construction or Department of Construction may refer to:

- Department of Construction, former government department of Australia
- Ministry of Construction of the People's Republic of China, a government department of China
- Ministry of Construction (Burma), a government department of Burma
- Ministry of Construction (Israel), a government department of Israel
- Ministry of Construction (Soviet Union), a government department in the former Soviet Union
- Ministry of Construction (Vietnam), a government department of Vietnam
- Ministry of Construction (Japan), a government ministry of Japan which in 2001 merged into the Ministry of Land, Infrastructure, Transport and Tourism
