= Mohd Zulkifli Yusof =

Malaysian footballer

Mohd Zulkifli
Personal information
- Full name: Mohd Zulkifli Yusof
- Date of birth: 6 January 1982 (age 44)
- Place of birth: Malaysia
- Position: Defender

Senior career*
Years	Team	Apps	(Gls)
2005–2007	Pahang FA		(0)
2007–2008	Perlis FA		(0)
- * Club domestic league appearances and goals

Mohd Zulkifli Yusof, is a Malaysian professional football player. He formerly played with Pahang FA and Perlis FA in the Malaysian Super League.
