= Aung Aung Oo =

Burmese footballer

Personal information
- Date of birth: 8 June 1980 (age 46)
- Height: 1.73 m (5 ft 8 in)
- Position: Goalkeeper

Senior career*
Years	Team	Apps	(Gls)
2009–2013	Yangon United	110	(0)

International career
1999–2010	Myanmar	54	(0)
- * Club domestic league appearances and goals

Aung Aung Oo (born 8 June 1980) is a Burmese retired professional footballer who played as goalkeeper. He made his first appearance for the Myanmar national football team in 1999.
