= Laos national football team =

Men's national association football team representing Laos

Laos
- Nickname(s): ທິມຊາດ, Thim Xat (The National Team) ລ້ານຊ້າງ, Lan Xang (Million Elephants)
- Association: Lao Football Federation
- Confederation: AFC (Asia)
- Sub-confederation: AFF (Southeast Asia)
- Head coach: Fábio Magrão
- Captain: Bounphachan Bounkong
- Most caps: Soukaphone Vongchiengkham (57)
- Top scorer: Visay Phaphouvanin (18)
- Home stadium: New Laos National Stadium
- FIFA code: LAO
First colours	Second colours

FIFA ranking
- Current: 188 ▼3 (7 October 2026)
- Highest: 134 (September 1998)
- Lowest: 210 (August 2012)

First international
- South Vietnam 7–0 Laos (Rangoon, Burma; 12 December 1961)

Biggest win
- Laos 6–1 Timor-Leste (Vientiane, Laos; 26 October 2010)

Biggest defeat
- United Arab Republic 15–0 Laos (Jakarta, Indonesia; 15 November 1963)

ASEAN Championship
- Appearances: 15 (first in 1996)
- Best result: Group stage (all)

ASEAN Challenge Cup
- Appearances: 1 (first in 2026)
- Best result: Group stage (2026)

The Laos national football team (Lao: ທິມຊາດ ບານເຕະ ແຫ່ງຊາດ ລາວ) is the men's national football team that represents the Laos in international football. It is governed by the Lao Football Federation.

== History ==
Laos established their national football association in 1951. The Southeast Asian nation is still waiting to make its entrance into a major international competition. Laos have never qualified for the FIFA World Cup, AFC Asian Cup or Asian Games and as an international side, their appearances have been restricted to regional tournaments such as the Southeast Asian Games and the AFF Championship. After years of internal strife, Laos focused on economic and political recovery. With the country achieving political stability, football has made an impact on Laotians.

Since making their appearance at the 1995 Southeast Asian Games, Laos has competed in the inaugural 1996 AFF Championship, drawing against Vietnam 1–1 and winning against Cambodia 1–0. Although they are new to the regional tournaments, Laos has displayed a fiery passion and talent. In 1995, they beat Brunei and Philippines and two years later in the 1997 Southeast Asian Games held in Jakarta, they also beat Malaysia 1–0 and Philippines 4–1. Domestic competitions are also active with over 60 clubs competing at various levels. Domestic football is amateur although most of the top teams are drawn from government ministries and public services. In the qualifying preliminary rounds for the 2004 Asian Cup, Laos beat Bangladesh 2–1. In the 2006 FIFA World Cup qualification, Laos qualified for the second round as a lucky loser after Guam and Nepal both withdrew from the competition, but proceeded to lose all its games (against Qatar, Iran and Jordan). They also advanced to the second round of the 2014 FIFA World Cup qualification for the 2014 FIFA World Cup, after defeating Cambodia 8–6 on aggregate. In the second round, they lost to China 13–3 on aggregate. Laos has defeated their much more established counterparts such as Brunei, Cambodia, Philippines, Singapore and Malaysia.

Laos' first appearance in a continental tournament was in 2014, when they played at the 2014 AFC Challenge Cup. In 2016, Laos were invited to the inaugural 2016 AFC Solidarity Cup held in Kuching being grouped with Macau, Sri Lanka and Mongolia. In the first match, Laos won Sri Lanka 2–0 before losing to Macau 1–4 but bounced back with another win against Mongolia 3–0 sending the team to the knockout stage. They would go on to face Nepal in the semi-finals and were 2–2 at the end of extra time but lost in the penalty shootout, thus bowing out from the cup.

In 2023, Laos participated in the first round of the 2026 FIFA World Cup qualification facing against Nepal. On 12 October 2023, Laos contested in a 1–1 draw at the Dasharath Rangasala in Kathmandu but lost 1–0 at home suffering a 2–1 aggregate. Laos would then go on to play in the 2024 ASEAN Championship after playing just two friendlies match against Malaysia and Thailand in November 2024 right before the tournament began.

=== 2026 FIFA ASEAN Cup ===
On the opening match of the inaugural 2026 FIFA ASEAN Cup on 24 September 2026, Laos defeated Brunei 3–1 at the Mong Kok Stadium.

== Team image ==
=== Kits ===
Kit provider	Period
(Thailand) FBT	1998
(Germany) Adidas	2004
(Thailand) Deffo	2006–2008
(Thailand) FBT	2008–2019
(Thailand) Grand Sport	2019–2022
(Laos) EVO	2022
(Thailand) Grand Sport	2022–2024
(Japan) Jogarbola	2025–present

Laos's current kit sponsor is Jogarbola. The contract started in June 2025. Laos was also previously sponsored by Adidas, FBT, Deffo, Evo and Grand Sport. The traditional home colour for the team is all red with white trim and the away colour is all white with red trim. Occasionally, the team wore dark blue short as home jersey and all blue as away jerseys.

== Results and fixtures ==
Win Draw Loss

=== 2026 ===
31 March 2027 AFC Asian Cup qualification	Nepal	0–1	Laos	Vientiane, Laos (Note: Stadiums in Nepal do not meet AFC requirements, thus Nepal were required to play their home matches at a neutral venue.)
19:00 UTC+7		Report; Report (AFC)	Bounphachan 47'	Stadium: New Laos National Stadium; Attendance: 2,327; Referee: Ahmad A'Qashah (Singapore)

25 July 2026 ASEAN Championship	Laos	0–5	Thailand	Vientiane, Laos
20:00 UTC+7		Report	Teerasak 11'; Kakana 27', 59'; Yotsakorn 49'; Sarach 52'	Stadium: New Laos National Stadium; Attendance: 7,678; Referee: Choi Hyun-jai (South Korea)

28 July 2026 ASEAN Championship	Malaysia	4–0	Laos	Kuala Lumpur, Malaysia
21:00 UTC+8	Paulo Josué 45'; Endrick 57'; Viengxay 66' (o.g.); Wan Kuzain 84'	Report		Stadium: Kuala Lumpur Stadium; Attendance: 10,044; Referee: Mohammed Sami Al-Ismail (Saudi Arabia)

1 August 2026 ASEAN Championship	Laos	1–4	Philippines	Vientiane, Laos
17:00 UTC+7	Damoth 7'	Report	Lucero 47'; Viengxay 52' (o.g.); Gayoso 60' (pen.); Sato 88'	Stadium: New Laos National Stadium; Attendance: 1,188; Referee: Kim Hee-gon (South Korea)

4 August 2026 ASEAN Championship	Myanmar	7–2	Laos	Yangon, Myanmar
16:30 UTC+6:30	Lwin Moe Aung 2'; Win Naing Tun 20', 41', 83'; Maung Maung Lwin 45+6' (pen.); Than Paing 52'; Hein Htet Aung 81'	Report	Bounchay 17'; Phoutthavong 23'	Stadium: Thuwunna Stadium; Referee: Alimardon Bananarov (Kyrgyzstan)

24 September 2026 FIFA ASEAN Challenge Cup	Laos	3–1	Brunei	Kowloon, Hong Kong
17:00 UTC+8	Bounkong 4' (pen.); Singsavang 24'; Chernvanglien 67'	Report	Haziq N. 45+1'	Stadium: Mong Kok Stadium; Referee: Wong Wai Lun (Hong Kong)

27 September 2026 FIFA ASEAN Challenge Cup	Hong Kong	4–0	Laos	Kowloon, Hong Kong
15:00 UTC+8	Sun Ming Him 12'; Camargo 33'; Dudu 55'; Orr 90+1' (pen.)	Report		Stadium: Kai Tak Stadium; Attendance: 18,873; Referee: Sanzhar Zhakypbekov (Kyrgyzstan)

== Coaching staff ==
Position	Name
Team manager	(Laos) Khonesamai Chanthavongsay
Head coach	(Brazil) Fábio Magrão
Assistant coach	(Thailand) Suphachai Klangkrasea (Laos) Kanlaya Sysomvang (Laos) Khola Oundala
Goalkeeper coach	(Laos) Chanthakhad Sianphongsay
Fitness coach	(Laos) Bounlap Siliamphone
Physiotherapists	(Laos) Sivilay Sihathep
Doctor	(Laos) Buaphan Sihavong
Kit manager	(Laos) Sengdeuan Syyapan
Kit manager	(Laos) Souksomphone Vongkhamphouy
Media manager	(Laos) Thipphakone Phakasy

=== Managerial history ===
As of 4 August 2026

Name	Period	Matches	Wins	Draws	Losses	Win %
(Laos) Songphu Phongsa	January 1996 – December 1999					
(Laos) Outhensackda Vatthana	July 1999 – June 2002					
(Laos) Vangchay Muangmany	February 2000 – May 2000					
(Russia) Boris Zhuravlyov	January 2001 – June 2001	1	0	0	1	0.00
(Laos) Soutsakhone Oudomphet	March 2002 – April 2003					
(France) Dominique Fernandez	March 2003 – September 2003					
(Laos) Saythong Syphasay	October 2003 – October 2004	7	0	1	6	0.00
(Laos) Bounlap Khenkitisack	October 2004 – September 2006	5	1	0	4	20.00
(Laos) Saythong Syphasay (2)	October 2006 – January 2008	7	3	1	3	42.86
(Russia) Valeriy Vdovin	February 2008 – November 2008	4	3	0	1	75.00
(Laos) Saysana Savatdy	December 2008 – July 2009	3	0	0	3	0.00
(Austria) Alfred Riedl	July 2009 – July 2010	5	1	2	2	20.00
(England) David Booth	July 2010 – December 2010	6	1	3	2	16.67
(Laos) Bounlap Khenkitisack (2)	January 2011 – February 2011	2	0	1	1	0.00
(Austria) Hans-Peter Schaller	February 2011 – December 2011	4	1	0	3	25.00
(Japan) Kokichi Kimura	May 2012 – January 2014	18	4	5	9	22.22
(Japan) Norio Tsukitate	January 2014 – July 2014	5	0	1	4	0.00
(England) David Booth	August 2014 – May 2015	10	4	1	5	40.00
(England) Steve Darby	June 2015 – May 2016	6	0	1	5	0.00
(Laos) Valakone Phomphakdy (interim)	May 2016 – December 2016	2	0	1	1	0.00
(Laos) Vernsavanh Sivisay (interim)	12–21 October 2016	2	1	0	1	50.00
(Singapore) Mike Wong	June 2017 – August 2018	3	1	0	2	33.33
(Singapore) V. Sundramoorthy	15 October 2018 – 2019	8	1	3	4	12.50
(Singapore) V. Selvaraj	December 2021	4	0	0	4	0.00
(Germany) Michael Weiß	7 January 2022 – 5 June 2023	13	3	1	9	23.07
(Laos) Kanlaya Sysomvang (interim)	20 September 2023 – 13 August 2024	2	0	1	1	0
(South Korea) Ha Hyeok-jun	14 August 2024 – 2 January 2026	12	1	3	8	8.33
(Serbia) Vladica Grujic	20 February 2026 – 27 September 2026	5	1	0	4	20.00

== Players ==
=== Current squad ===
The following 23 players were called up for the 2026 FIFA ASEAN Challenge Cup.

Caps and goals as of 27 September 2026, after the match against the Hong Kong.

No.	Pos.	Player	Date of birth (age)	Caps	Goals	Club
1	GK	Souksamone Vethita	13 August 2007 (age 19)	2	0	(Lao Football Federation) Salavan United
12	GK	Xaysomphong Thipphavong	25 March 2008 (age 18)	0	0	(Lao Football Federation) Mazda Laos GB
15	GK	Anoulak Vilaphone	15 February 2001 (age 25)	0	0	(Lao Football Federation) Mazda Laos GB
2	DF	Phoutthavong Sangvilay	16 October 2004 (age 22)	32	3	(Lao Football Federation) Ezra
3	DF	Phahatxay Keomany	27 April 2006 (age 20)	1	0	(Lao Football Federation) BIS
4	DF	Seng Athit Manilay	29 July 2008 (age 18)	2	0	(Lao Football Federation) Ezra
5	DF	Alounxay Thepsouvanh	12 October 2008 (age 18)	2	0	(Lao Football Federation) Salavan United
16	DF	Xayasith Singsavang	13 December 2000 (age 25)	17	1	(Lao Football Federation) Champasak HAGL Avenir
20	DF	Sonesanith Phommachanh	11 November 2002 (age 24)	3	0	(Lao Football Federation) Mazda Laos GB
21	DF	Chekky Inthisone	2 June 2008 (age 18)	1	0	(Lao Football Federation) BIS
22	DF	Bounthasak Chandala	25 November 2009 (age 16)	2	0	(Lao Football Federation) Army
23	DF	Anoulak Singsavang	21 September 2009 (age 17)	0	0	(Lao Football Federation) Salavan United
6	MF	Phouluang Vinnavong	12 January 2005 (age 21)	2	0	(Lao Football Federation) Champasak HAGL Avenir
7	MF	Khonesavanh Keonuchanh	4 June 2004 (age 22)	3	0	(Italian Football Federation) Rome City Institute
8	MF	Damoth Thongkhamsavath	3 April 2004 (age 22)	22	2	(Vietnam Football Federation) Dong A Thanh Hoa
10	MF	Roman Angot	2 March 2001 (age 25)	4	0	(German Football Association) SV Linx
13	MF	Sonexay Xaykhampheng	4 August 2007 (age 19)	1	0	(Lao Football Federation) Army
18	MF	Chansamone Phetsomphone	19 February 2007 (age 19)	1	0	(Lao Football Federation) Champasak HAGL Avenir
9	FW	Kydavone Souvanny	22 December 1999 (age 26)	23	4	(Lao Football Federation) Mazda Laos GB
11	FW	Bounchay Chernvanglien	28 December 2006 (age 19)	6	2	(Lao Football Federation) Namtha United
14	FW	Thavisok Latsavong	23 December 2007 (age 18)	1	0	(Lao Football Federation) Army
17	FW	Bounphachan Bounkong (captain)	29 November 2000 (age 25)	38	9	(Lao Football Federation) Luang Prabang EDL
19	FW	Somwang Choummaly	2 April 2006 (age 20)	2	0	(Lao Football Federation) Mazda Laos GB

=== Recent call-ups ===
The following players had been called up to the squad within 12 months preceding the above draft.

Pos.	Player	Date of birth (age)	Caps	Goals	Club	Latest call-up
GK	Keo-Oudone Souvannasangso	19 June 2000 (age 26)	13	0	(Laos) Army	2026 ASEAN Championship
GK	Kop Lokphathip	8 May 2006 (age 20)	9	0	(Laos) Ezra	2026 ASEAN Championship
GK	Soulisack Souvankham	10 September 2007 (age 19)	0	0	(Laos) Luang Prabang EDL	2026 ASEAN Championship
GK	Thatsaphone Xaiyasone	18 January 2001 (age 25)	0	0	Mazda Laos GB	v. Vietnam, 19 November 2025
DF	Phetdavanh Somsanith	24 April 2004 (age 22)	19	0	(Laos) Salavan United	2026 ASEAN Championship
DF	Kaharn Phetsivilay	9 September 1998 (age 28)	18	0	(Laos) Luang Prabang EDL	2026 ASEAN Championship
DF	Phonsack Sisavath	4 October 2004 (age 22)	11	0	(Laos) Salavan United	2026 ASEAN Championship
DF	Vongsakda Chanthaleuxay	28 November 2004 (age 21)	5	0	Mazda Laos GB	2026 ASEAN Championship
DF	Bounphaeng Xaysombath	5 February 2005 (age 21)	4	0	(Laos) Luang Prabang EDL	2026 ASEAN Championship
DF	Viengxay Sidavong	3 July 1996 (age 30)	3	0	(Laos) Salavan United	2026 ASEAN Championship
DF	Vilai Kulungsy	24 September 2000 (age 26)	3	0	(Laos) BIS	2026 ASEAN Championship
DF	Sonevilay Phetviengsy	27 May 2004 (age 22)	2	0	Mazda Laos GB	2026 ASEAN Championship
DF	Avilay Siphavanh	6 May 2005 (age 21)	1	0	(Laos) Salavan United	2026 ASEAN Championship
DF	Okham Latsachack	22 July 2007 (age 19)	0	0	(Laos) Army	2026 ASEAN Championship ^{PRE}
DF	Khamsanga Phimmasone	20 April 2001 (age 25)	0	0	(Laos) Champasak HAGL Avenir	v. Nepal, 31 March 2026
DF	Kiengthavesak Xayxanapanya	14 March 1999 (age 27)	4	0	Mazda Laos GB	v. Nepal, 31 March 2026 ^{PRE}
DF	Aliyakone Phongsavanh	2 February 2004 (age 22)	0	0	Mazda Laos GB	v. Nepal, 31 March 2026 ^{PRE}
DF	Anantaza Siphongphan	9 November 2004 (age 22)	25	0	(Laos) Ezra	v. Vietnam, 19 November 2025
DF	Xeedee Phomsavanh	28 March 2002 (age 24)	9	0	(Laos) Ezra	v. Vietnam, 19 November 2025
DF	Khammanh Thapaseuth	30 November 2007 (age 18)	4	0	(Laos) Ezra	v. Vietnam, 19 November 2025
DF	Oun Phetvongsa	29 September 2003 (age 23)	1	0	(Laos) BIS	v. Vietnam, 19 November 2025
DF	Chittakone Vannachone	24 December 2004 (age 21)	0	0	(Laos) Luang Prabang EDL	v. Vietnam, 19 November 2025
MF	Chanthavixay Khounthoumphone	17 February 2004 (age 22)	24	1	(Laos) Salavan United	2026 ASEAN Championship
MF	Somlith Sengvanny	5 August 1999 (age 27)	8	0	(Laos) Army	2026 ASEAN Championship
MF	Sayfon Keohanam	11 July 2006 (age 20)	3	0	(Laos) Ezra	2026 ASEAN Championship
MF	Phayak Siphanom	4 March 2008 (age 18)	3	0	(Laos) Salavan United	2026 ASEAN Championship
MF	Anousone Xaypanya	16 December 2002 (age 23)	17	0	(Laos) Salavan United	2026 ASEAN Championship ^{PRE}
MF	Ketsada Detkhoummane	20 May 2007 (age 19)	0	0	Mazda Laos GB	v. Nepal, 31 March 2026 ^{PRE}
MF	Phoutthalak Thongsanith	3 December 2002 (age 23)	4	0	(Laos) Ezra	v. Vietnam, 19 November 2025
FW	Chony Wenpaserth	27 November 2002 (age 23)	30	2	(Laos) Salavan United	2026 ASEAN Championship
FW	Soukphachan Lueanthala	24 August 2002 (age 24)	20	0	(Laos) Salavan United	2026 ASEAN Championship
FW	Kouaycheng Noophackde	2 January 2001 (age 25)	5	0	(Laos) Champasak HAGL Avenir	2026 ASEAN Championship
FW	Peter Phanthavong	15 February 2006 (age 20)	12	2	(Laos) Ezra	2026 ASEAN Championship ^{INJ}
FW	Kadam Koneyer	10 October 2008 (age 18)	1	0	(Laos) Salavan United	v. Nepal, 31 March 2026
FW	Khampane Douangvilay	5 February 2004 (age 22)	2	0	(Laos) Salavan United	v. Nepal, 31 March 2026 ^{PRE}
FW	Odin Siphanit	7 August 2009 (age 17)	0	0	Mazda Laos GB	v. Nepal, 31 March 2026 ^{PRE}
FW	Cham Vanpaserth	14 June 1998 (age 28)	0	0	(Laos) Luang Prabang EDL	v. Vietnam, 19 November 2025
^{INJ} Withdrew from the squad due to injury^{PRE} Included in the preliminary squad or on standby^{RET} Retired from the team^{SUS} Serving suspension from the team^{WD} Withdrew from the squad due to non-injury issue

== Player records ==
As of 19 November 2025
Players in bold are still active with Laos.

=== Most appearances ===
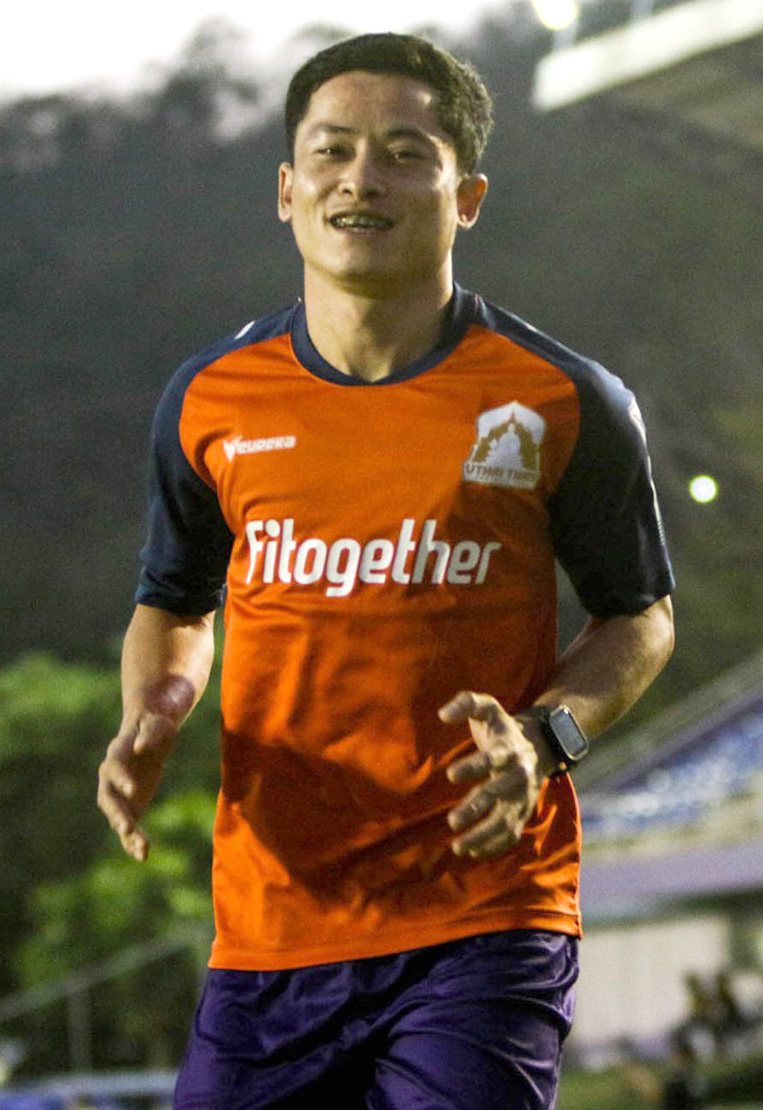
Soukaphone Vongchiengkham is Laos' most capped player with 57 appearances.

Rank	Player	Caps	Goals	Career
1	Soukaphone Vongchiengkham	58	15	2010–2023
2	Saynakhonevieng Phommapanya	55	2	2006–2016
3	Visay Phaphouvanin	50	19	2002–2013
3	Khampheng Sayavutthi	50	15	2010–2017
5	**Phoutthasay Khochalern**	47	1	2013–present
6	Chalana Luang-Amath	37	5	1996–2004
6	Ketsada Souksavanh	37	3	2008–2014
8	**Bounphachan Bounkong**	35	7	2018–present
8	Khamphoumy Hanvilay	35	0	2011–2016
8	Keoviengphet Liththideth	35	4	2010–2018

=== Top goalscorers ===
Rank	Player	Goals	Caps	Ratio	Career
1	Visay Phaphouvanin	19	50	0.38	2002–2013
2	Khampheng Sayavutthi	15	50	0.3	2010–2017
2	Soukaphone Vongchiengkham	15	58	0.26	2010–2023
4	Bounlap Khenkitisack	7	19	0.37	1993–2000
4	**Bounphachan Bounkong**	7	35	0.2	2018–present
6	Lamnao Singto	6	21	0.29	2004–2011
6	Phithack Kongmathilath	6	24	0.25	2017–2022
6	Phatthana Syvilay	6	31	0.19	2010–2016
6	Khonesavanh Sihavong	6	34	0.18	2012–2017
10	Kanlaya Sysomvang	5	19	0.26	2010–2012
10	Sitthideth Khanthavong	5	24	0.21	2012–2016
10	Chalana Luang-Amath	5	37	0.14	1993–2004

== Tournament record ==
=== FIFA World Cup ===
Final								Qualification					
Year	Round	Pld	W	D	L	F	A	Pld	W	D	L	F	A
(Switzerland) 1954 to (France) 1998	Did not enter							Did not enter					
(South Korea) (Japan) 2002	Did not qualify							6	1	1	4	3	40
(Germany) 2006	Did not qualify							8	0	1	7	3	36
(South Africa) 2010	Did not enter							Did not enter					
(Brazil) 2014	Did not qualify							4	1	0	3	11	19
(Russia) 2018	Did not qualify							8	1	1	6	6	29
(Qatar) 2022	Did not qualify							2	0	1	1	0	1
(Canada) (Mexico) (United States) 2026	Did not qualify							2	0	1	1	1	2
(Morocco) (Portugal) (Spain) 2030													
(Saudi Arabia) 2034
Total	0/6	0	0	0	0	0		30	3	5	22	24	127

=== AFC Asian Cup ===
Final									Qualification					
Year	Round	Position	Pld	W	D	L	GF	GA	Pld	W	D	L	GF	GA
(Hong Kong) 1956	Did not enter								Did not enter					
(South Korea) 1960	Did not enter								Did not enter					
(Israel) 1964	Did not enter								Did not enter					
(Iran) 1968	Did not enter								Did not enter					
(Thailand) 1972	Withdrew								Withdrew					
(Iran) 1976	Withdrew								Withdrew					
(Kuwait) 1980	Withdrew								Withdrew					
(Singapore) 1984	Did not enter								Did not enter					
(Qatar) 1988	Did not enter								Did not enter					
(Japan) 1992	Did not enter								Did not enter					
(United Arab Emirates) 1996	Did not enter								Did not enter					
(Lebanon) 2000	Did not qualify								3	1	0	2	2	14
(China) 2004	Did not qualify								2	1	0	1	3	6
(Indonesia) (Malaysia) (Thailand) (Vietnam) 2007	Did not enter								Did not enter					
(Qatar) 2011	Did not enter								Did not enter					
(Australia) 2015	Did not qualify								AFC Challenge Cup					
(United Arab Emirates) 2019	Did not qualify								12	1	2	9	8	41
(Qatar) 2023	Did not qualify								2	0	1	1	0	1
(Saudi Arabia) 2027	Did not qualify													
Total									19	3	3	13	13	62

=== Asian Games ===
Final
Year	Round	M	W	D	L	GF	GA
(Thailand) 1998	21st	2	0	0	2	1	11

=== AFC Challenge Cup ===
Final
Year	Round	Pos	Pld	W	D	L	GF	GA
(Bangladesh) 2006	Removed by AFC							
(India) 2008	Withdrew							
(Sri Lanka) 2010	Did not enter							
(Nepal) 2012	Did not qualify							
(Maldives) 2014	Group stage	8/8	3	0	1	2	1	7
Total			3	0	1	2	1	7

=== AFC Solidarity Cup ===
Final
Year	Round	Pld	W	D	L	GF	GA
(Malaysia) 2016	Third place	5	3	1	1	11	9

=== ASEAN Championship ===
ASEAN Championship record									Qualification record					
Year	Round	Pos	Pld	W	D	L	GF	GA	Pld	W	D	L	GF	GA
(Singapore) 1996	Group stage	7th	4	1	1	2	5	10	No qualification					
(Vietnam) 1998	Group stage	7th	3	0	1	2	2	8	2	1	0	1	2	4
(Thailand) 2000	Group stage	9th	4	0	0	4	0	16	No qualification					
(Indonesia) (Singapore) 2002	Group stage	8th	3	0	1	2	3	8	No qualification					
(Malaysia) (Vietnam) 2004	Group stage	8th	4	1	0	3	4	16	No qualification					
(Singapore) (Thailand) 2007	Group stage	8th	3	0	0	3	1	23	4	3	1	0	11	6
(Indonesia) (Thailand) 2008	Group stage	8th	3	0	0	3	0	13	4	3	0	1	9	7
(Indonesia) (Vietnam) 2010	Group stage	8th	3	0	1	2	3	13	3	1	2	0	8	3
(Malaysia) (Thailand) 2012	Group stage	7th	3	0	1	2	6	10	4	2	1	1	5	4
(Singapore) (Vietnam) 2014	Group stage	8th	3	0	0	3	2	12	4	3	0	1	10	6
(Myanmar) (Philippines) 2016	Did not qualify								3	2	0	1	7	6
(ASEAN) 2018	Group stage	9th	4	0	0	4	3	12	Qualified automatically					
(Singapore) 2020	Group stage	9th	4	0	0	4	1	14	Qualified automatically					
(ASEAN) 2022	Group stage	9th	4	0	1	3	2	15	Qualified automatically					
(ASEAN) 2024	Group stage	9th	4	0	2	2	7	11	Qualified automatically					
(ASEAN) 2026	Group stage	10th	4	0	0	4	3	20	Qualified automatically					
Total	Group stage	15/16	53	2	8	43	42	201	24	15	4	5	52	36

=== FIFA ASEAN Challenge Cup ===
FIFA ASEAN Challenge Cup record
Year	Round	Pos	Pld	W	D	L	GF	GA
(Hong Kong) 2026	Group stage	4th	2	1	0	1	3	5

== Head-to-head record ==
Last match updated was against Hong Kong on 27 September 2026

Key
More wins than losses
Equal wins/losses ratio
More losses than wins

Opponent	Pld	W	D	L	GF	GA	GD	Confederation
Afghanistan	3	0	2	1	1	3	−2	AFC
Bangladesh	5	1	2	2	4	5	−1	AFC
Bhutan	1	1	0	0	2	1	+1	AFC
Brunei	12	11	0	1	33	16	+17	AFC
Cambodia	17	6	3	8	24	30	−6	AFC
China	2	0	0	2	3	13	−10	AFC
Chinese Taipei	4	0	1	3	4	10	−6	AFC
Egypt	1	0	0	1	0	15	−15	CAF
Guam	1	0	1	0	1	1	0	AFC
Hong Kong	4	0	0	4	3	17	−14	AFC
India	2	0	0	2	1	7	−6	AFC
Indonesia	10	0	2	9	12	48	−36	AFC
Iran	3	0	0	3	1	20	−19	AFC
Jordan	2	0	0	2	2	8	−6	AFC
Kazakhstan	1	0	0	1	0	5	−5	UEFA
Kuwait	2	1	0	1	3	2	+1	AFC
Lebanon	2	0	0	2	0	9	−9	AFC
Lesotho	1	0	0	1	1	3	−2	CAF
Macau	2	0	0	2	2	7	−5	AFC
Malaysia	23	1	5	19	12	74	−62	AFC
Maldives	4	0	1	3	3	15	−12	AFC
Mongolia	5	3	1	1	8	5	+3	AFC
Myanmar	20	0	4	16	15	65	−50	AFC
Nepal	8	2	2	4	9	10	−1	AFC
Oman	2	0	0	2	0	19	−19	AFC
Philippines	15	7	3	5	24	26	−2	AFC
Qatar	2	0	0	2	1	11	−10	AFC
Saudi Arabia	1	0	0	1	0	4	−4	AFC
Singapore	13	1	1	11	12	42	−30	AFC
South Korea	7	0	0	5	0	28	−28	AFC
Sri Lanka	8	3	2	3	12	14	−2	AFC
Syria	2	0	0	2	0	20	−20	AFC
Thailand	14	1	2	11	15	51	−36	AFC
Timor-Leste	8	7	0	1	22	9	+13	AFC
Turkmenistan	2	0	0	2	3	9	−6	AFC
United Arab Emirates	3	0	0	3	0	9	−9	AFC
Vietnam (Note: Includes matches against South Vietnam and North Vietnam.)	25	0	2	23	6	97	−91	AFC
37 Countries	223	43	31	149	224	705	−481	FIFA

== See also ==
- Laos national under-23 football team
- Laos national under-21 football team
- Laos national under-20 football team
- Laos national under-17 football team
- Football in Laos
