= Soe Thiha Aung =

Burmese footballer

Personal information
- Full name: Soe Thiha Aung
- Date of birth: December 12, 1985 (age 40)
- Position: Midfielder

International career
Years	Team	Apps	(Gls)
2006–2015	Myanmar	27	(0)

Soe Thiha Aung (Burmese: စိုးသီဟအောင် ;born 12 December 1985) is a footballer from Myanmar. He made his first appearance for the Myanmar national football team in 2006.

== International ==
In 2007, He represented the Myanmar U-23 football team in the 2007 SEA Games, who were silver medalists after losing to the Thailand U-23 football team in the final.
