= 2004 AFF Championship squads =

Association football competition squads

Below are the squads for the 2004 AFF Championship, co-hosted by Vietnam and Malaysia, which took place between 7 December 2004 and 16 January 2005. The players' listed ages are their ages on the tournament's opening day (7 December 2004).

== Group A ==
=== Indonesia ===
Coach: (England) Peter Withe

No.	Pos.	Player	Date of birth (age)	Caps	Club
1	GK	Hendro Kartiko	24 April 1973 (aged 31)		(Indonesia) Persebaya Surabaya
2	DF	Ismed Sofyan	28 August 1979 (aged 25)		(Indonesia) Persija Jakarta
3	DF	Ortizan Solossa	28 October 1977 (aged 27)		(Indonesia) PSM Makassar
4	DF	Jack Komboy	18 April 1977 (aged 27)		(Indonesia) PSM Makassar
5	DF	Charis Yulianto	11 July 1978 (aged 26)		(Indonesia) PSM Makassar
6	MF	Mauly Lessy	7 August 1974 (aged 30)		(Indonesia) Persikota Tangerang
7	FW	Boaz Solossa	15 March 1986 (aged 18)		(Indonesia) Persipura Jayapura
8	FW	Elie Aiboy	20 April 1979 (aged 25)		(Indonesia) Persija Jakarta
9	FW	Ilham Jaya Kesuma	19 September 1978 (aged 26)		(Indonesia) Persita Tangerang
10	FW	Kurniawan Dwi Yulianto	13 July 1976 (aged 28)		(Indonesia) Persebaya Surabaya
11	MF	Ponaryo Astaman (c)	25 September 1979 (aged 25)		(Indonesia) PSM Makassar
12	GK	Jendri Pitoy	15 January 1981 (aged 23)		(Indonesia) Persikota Tangerang
13	MF	Agus Indra Kurniawan	27 February 1982 (aged 22)		(Indonesia) Persija Jakarta
14	MF	Firman Utina	15 December 1981 (aged 22)		(Indonesia) Persita Tangerang
15	MF	Supriyono Salimin	12 August 1981 (aged 23)		(Indonesia) Persikota Tangerang
16	MF	Syamsul Chaeruddin	9 February 1983 (aged 21)		(Indonesia) PSM Makassar
17	DF	Hamka Hamzah	9 January 1984 (aged 20)		(Indonesia) Persija Jakarta
18	DF	Firmansyah	7 April 1980 (aged 24)		(Indonesia) Persikota Tangerang
19	DF	Aris Indarto	23 February 1978 (aged 26)		(Indonesia) Persija Jakarta
21	MF	Mahyadi Panggabean	8 January 1982 (aged 22)		(Indonesia) PSMS Medan
22	GK	Mukti Ali Raja	6 April 1980 (aged 24)		(Indonesia) Persija Jakarta
23	FW	Saktiawan Sinaga	19 February 1982 (aged 22)		(Indonesia) PSMS Medan

=== Singapore ===
Coach: (Serbia and Montenegro) Radojko Avramović

No.	Pos.	Player	Date of birth (age)	Caps	Club
1	GK	Hassan Sunny	2 April 1984 (aged 20)		(Singapore) Young Lions
2	FW	Ridhuan Muhammad	6 May 1984 (aged 20)		(Singapore) Young Lions
3	MF	Ishak Zainol	12 May 1980 (aged 24)		(Singapore) Tanjong Pagar United
4	MF	Hasrin Jailani	22 November 1975 (aged 29)		(Singapore) Geylang United
5	DF	Aide Iskandar (c)	28 March 1975 (aged 29)		(Singapore) Home United
6	DF	Baihakki Khaizan	31 January 1984 (aged 20)		(Singapore) Young Lions
7	MF	Goh Tat Chuan	6 February 1974 (aged 30)		(Singapore) Woodlands Wellington
8	FW	Noh Alam Shah	3 September 1980 (aged 24)		(Singapore) Tampines Rovers
9	DF	Ismail Yunos	24 October 1986 (aged 18)		Singapore U-18's
10	FW	Indra Sahdan Daud	5 March 1979 (aged 25)		(Singapore) Home United
11	MF	Imran Sahib	12 October 1982 (aged 22)		(Singapore) Home United
12	GK	Shahril Jantan	20 April 1984 (aged 20)		(Singapore) SAFFC
13	DF	Noh Rahman	2 August 1980 (aged 24)		(Singapore) Geylang United
14	DF	S. Subramani	5 August 1972 (aged 32)		(Singapore) Home United
15	MF	Tengku Mushadad	7 August 1984 (aged 20)		(Singapore) Home United
16	DF	Daniel Bennett	7 January 1978 (aged 26)		(Singapore) SAFFC
17	FW	Shahril Ishak	23 January 1984 (aged 20)		(Singapore) Young Lions
18	GK	Lionel Lewis	16 December 1982 (aged 21)		(Singapore) Young Lions
19	FW	Khairul Amri	15 March 1985 (aged 19)		(Singapore) Young Lions
20	FW	Agu Casmir	22 March 1984 (aged 20)		(Singapore) Young Lions
21	DF	Jaslee Hatta	11 July 1981 (aged 23)		(Singapore) Woodlands Wellington
22	FW	Itimi Dickson	14 November 1983 (aged 21)		(Singapore) Young Lions

=== Vietnam ===
Coach: (Brazil) Edson Tavares, Trần Văn Khánh (v. Laos)

No.	Pos.	Player	Date of birth (age)	Caps	Club
1	GK	Trần Minh Quang	19 April 1973 (aged 31)		(Vietnam) Hoa Lâm Bình Định
2	DF	Nguyễn Văn Đàn	30 July 1974 (aged 30)		(Vietnam) Hoàng Anh Gia Lai
3	DF	Nguyễn Huy Hoàng	4 January 1981 (aged 23)		(Vietnam) Sông Lam Nghệ An
4	DF	Lê Quang Trãi	11 February 1977 (aged 27)		(Vietnam) Hoàng Anh Gia Lai
5	DF	Phạm Hùng Dũng	28 September 1978 (aged 26)		(Vietnam) Đà Nẵng
6	DF	Nguyễn Đức Thắng	28 May 1976 (aged 28)		(Vietnam) Thể Công
7	MF	Trần Trường Giang	1 November 1976 (aged 28)		(Vietnam) Bình Dương
8	FW	Thạch Bảo Khanh	25 April 1979 (aged 25)		(Vietnam) Thể Công
9	FW	Lê Công Vinh	10 December 1985 (aged 18)		(Vietnam) Sông Lam Nghệ An
10	FW	Lê Huỳnh Đức (c)	20 April 1972 (aged 32)		(Vietnam) Đà Nẵng
11	MF	Lê Hồng Minh	15 September 1978 (aged 26)		(Vietnam) Đà Nẵng
12	MF	Nguyễn Minh Phương	5 July 1980 (aged 24)		(Vietnam) Gạch Đồng Tâm Long An
13	DF	Lê Anh Dũng	22 January 1979 (aged 25)		(Vietnam) LG Hà Nội ACB
14	FW	Đặng Văn Thành	30 September 1984 (aged 20)		(Vietnam) Hải Phòng
15	DF	Nguyễn Mạnh Dũng	12 March 1977 (aged 27)		(Vietnam) Đà Nẵng
16	MF	Nguyễn Trung Kiên	10 June 1979 (aged 25)		(Vietnam) Sông Đà Nam Định
17	DF	Vũ Duy Hoàng	7 September 1981 (aged 23)		(Vietnam) Sông Đà Nam Định
18	FW	Phan Thanh Bình	1 November 1986 (aged 18)		(Vietnam) Đồng Tháp
19	MF	Trịnh Xuân Thành	23 January 1976 (aged 28)		(Vietnam) Bình Dương
20	GK	Bùi Quang Huy	24 July 1982 (aged 22)		(Vietnam) Sông Đà Nam Định
21	GK	Nguyễn Thế Anh	21 September 1981 (aged 23)		(Vietnam) Đông Á Bank
22	MF	Phan Văn Tài Em	23 April 1982 (aged 22)		(Vietnam) Gạch Đồng Tâm Long An

=== Laos ===
Coach: Bounlap Khenkitisack

No.	Pos.	Player	Date of birth (age)	Caps	Club
1	GK	Siththalay Kanyavong	9 November 1984 (aged 20)		(Laos) Lao-American College
2	DF	Anousone Khothsombath	24 March 1984 (aged 20)		(Laos) Lao-American College
3	DF	Soulivanh Ratxachak	28 September 1987 (aged 17)		(Laos) MCTPC
4	DF	Kitsada Thongkhen	8 April 1987 (aged 17)		(Laos) MCTPC
5	MF	Chalana Luang-Amath (c)	10 May 1972 (aged 32)		(Laos) Vientiane
6	DF	Anan Thepsouvanh	21 October 1981 (aged 23)		(Laos) MCTPC
7	MF	Souvanno Luang-Amath	10 February 1973 (aged 31)		(Laos) Vientiane
8	MF	Chandalaphone Liepvixay	8 August 1984 (aged 20)		National University of Laos
9	FW	Visay Phaphouvanin	12 June 1985 (aged 19)		(Laos) Vientiane
10	FW	Lamnao Singto	15 April 1988 (aged 16)		(Laos) MCTPC
11	MF	Vidalack Souvanhnavongsa	13 January 1987 (aged 17)		(Laos) MCTPC
12	FW	Davone Vongsamany	25 June 1983 (aged 21)		(Laos) Vientiane
13	MF	Souksakhone Vongsamany	3 February 1986 (aged 18)		(Laos) Lao-American College
14	DF	Sengphet Thongphachan	9 July 1987 (aged 17)		(Laos) MCTPC
15	MF	Chandalaphone Liepvixay	14 April 1986 (aged 18)		(Laos) Lao-American College
16	MF	Vannaseng Nakady	17 June 1981 (aged 23)		(Laos) MCTPC
17	FW	Phonesouk Sitthilath	6 November 1980 (aged 24)		National University of Laos
18	GK	Vongsackda Sianphongsay	23 December 1987 (aged 16)		(Laos) MCTPC
19	MF	Sounthalay Saysongkham	21 August 1987 (aged 17)		National University of Laos
20	GK	Vanhnasith Thilavongsa	21 May 1983 (aged 21)		(Laos) Vientiane
21	MF	Souksavanh Phengsengsay	5 November 1985 (aged 19)		(Laos) National Public Security
22	DF	Vilayphone Xayavong	4 September 1973 (aged 31)		(Laos) Vientiane

=== Cambodia ===
Coach: Som Saran

No.	Pos.	Player	Date of birth (age)	Caps	Club
1	GK	Hong Viskora	21 April 1986 (aged 18)		(Cambodia) Cambodian Army
2	DF	Sun Sampratna	13 July 1983 (aged 21)		(Cambodia) General Logistics
3	DF	Poeu Samnang	13 March 1982 (aged 22)		(Cambodia) Cambodian Navy
4	DF	Soueur Chanveasna	10 November 1978 (aged 26)		(Cambodia) Khemara
5	FW	Hok Sochivorn	23 September 1983 (aged 21)		(Cambodia) Cambodian Navy
6	DF	Peas Sothy	15 December 1979 (aged 24)		(Cambodia) Cambodian Army
7	MF	Pen Stephane	29 May 1986 (aged 18)		(Cambodia) Cambodian Navy
8	MF	Hang Sokunthea	15 January 1982 (aged 22)		(Cambodia) Samart United
9	MF	Ung Kanyanith	12 December 1982 (aged 21)		(Cambodia) Khemara
10	MF	Bouy Dary	13 October 1986 (aged 18)		(Cambodia) Cambodian Navy
11	MF	Chan Rithy	11 November 1983 (aged 21)		(Cambodia) Cambodian Army
12	DF	Kun Koun	9 August 1984 (aged 20)		(Cambodia) Cambodian Army
13	MF	Keo Kosal	13 June 1986 (aged 18)		(Cambodia) Cambodian Army
14	DF	Tun Sovanrithy	11 February 1987 (aged 17)		(Cambodia) Military Police
15	DF	Suon Thuon	20 June 1986 (aged 18)		(Cambodia) Military Police
16	FW	Teab Vathanak	7 January 1985 (aged 19)		(Cambodia) Kampot
17	MF	Hing Darith	8 October 1976 (aged 28)		(Cambodia) Cambodian Navy
18	FW	Nuth Sinoun	10 October 1985 (aged 19)		(Cambodia) Cambodian Navy
19	MF	Samel Nasa	25 April 1984 (aged 20)		(Cambodia) Military Police
20	MF	Rith Dika	16 April 1982 (aged 22)		(Cambodia) Military Police
21	GK	Thai Sineth	10 January 1984 (aged 20)		(Cambodia) Cambodian Navy
22	GK	Ouk Mic	15 September 1983 (aged 21)		(Cambodia) Khemara

== Group B ==
=== Myanmar ===
Coach: (Bulgaria) Ivan Venkov Kolev

No.	Pos.	Player	Date of birth (age)	Caps	Club
1	GK	Aung Aung Oo	8 June 1982 (aged 22)		(Myanmar) Finance and Revenue
2	DF	Khin Maung Tun	18 September 1985 (aged 19)		(Myanmar) Finance and Revenue
3	DF	Zaw Linn Tun II	23 July 1983 (aged 21)		(Myanmar) Commerce
4	DF	Aung Kyaw Myint	24 September 1982 (aged 22)		(Myanmar) Finance and Revenue
5	DF	Moe Kyaw Thu	27 July 1979 (aged 25)		(Myanmar) Finance and Revenue
6	DF	Kyaw Khing Win	23 December 1983 (aged 20)		(Myanmar) Energy
7	MF	Soe Myat Min	19 May 1982 (aged 22)		(Myanmar) Finance and Revenue
8	MF	Aung Kyaw Moe	2 May 1982 (aged 22)		(Myanmar) Finance and Revenue
9	FW	Yan Paing	27 November 1983 (aged 21)		(Myanmar) Finance and Revenue
10	FW	Myo Hlaing Win	24 May 1973 (aged 31)		(Myanmar) Finance and Revenue
11	MF	Mar Lar	11 December 1985 (aged 18)		(Myanmar) Commerce
12	DF	Zaw Htet Aung	11 May 1987 (aged 17)		(Myanmar) Energy
13	DF	Zaw Linn Tun I	20 October 1982 (aged 22)		(Myanmar) Home Affairs
14	MF	Myo Min Tun	14 July 1986 (aged 18)		(Myanmar) Commerce
15	MF	Zaw Zaw	13 October 1986 (aged 18)		(Myanmar) YCDC
16	FW	Lal Ceu Luai	20 June 1982 (aged 22)		(Myanmar) Construction
17	MF	Tun Tun Win	15 December 1987 (aged 16)		(Myanmar) Finance and Revenue
18	GK	Tun Tun Lin	5 November 1986 (aged 18)		(Myanmar) YCDC
19	MF	Bo Bo Aung	13 August 1986 (aged 18)		(Myanmar) Commerce
20	MF	Aung Kyaw Tun	5 August 1986 (aged 18)		(Myanmar) Forestry
21	FW	San Day Thein	1 May 1988 (aged 16)		(Myanmar) Construction
22	DF	Min Thu	2 June 1979 (aged 25)		(Myanmar) Commerce

=== Malaysia ===
Coach: (Hungary) Bertalan Bicskei

No.	Pos.	Player	Date of birth (age)	Caps	Club
1	GK	Azizon Abdul Kadir	10 June 1980 (aged 24)		(Malaysia) Negri Sembilan
2	DF	Leong Hong Seng	3 February 1975 (aged 29)		(Malaysia) Selangor
3	DF	Norhafiz Zamani Misbah	15 July 1981 (aged 23)		(Malaysia) Pahang
4	DF	Norfazly Alias	31 May 1981 (aged 23)		(Malaysia) Terengganu
5	MF	D. Surendran	16 April 1980 (aged 24)		(Malaysia) Selangor
6	DF	Wan Rohaimi Wan Ismail	19 May 1976 (aged 28)		(Malaysia) Public Bank
7	MF	Mohd Fadzli Saari	1 January 1983 (aged 21)		(Malaysia) Pahang
8	MF	Chan Wing Hoong	29 April 1977 (aged 27)		(Malaysia) Perak
9	FW	Mohd Amri Yahyah	12 January 1981 (aged 23)		(Malaysia) Selangor
10	FW	Liew Kit Kong	6 January 1979 (aged 25)		(Malaysia) Perak
12	MF	Muhammad Shukor Adan	24 September 1979 (aged 25)		(Malaysia) Selangor
13	DF	Wong Sai Kong	19 September 1978 (aged 26)		(Malaysia) Sarawak
14	FW	V. Saravanan	1 November 1978 (aged 26)		(Malaysia) Perak
15	DF	Ahmad Tharmini Saiban	27 August 1978 (aged 26)		(Malaysia) Malacca
16	DF	Chow Chee Weng	21 May 1977 (aged 27)		(Malaysia) Penang
17	MF	K. Nanthakumar	13 October 1977 (aged 27)		(Malaysia) Perak
18	DF	Muhamad Kaironnisam Sahabudin Hussain	10 May 1979 (aged 25)		(Malaysia) Perlis
19	DF	Rosdi Talib (c)	11 January 1976 (aged 28)		(Malaysia) Pahang
20	FW	Mohd Ivan Yusoff	13 May 1982 (aged 22)		(Malaysia) Kuala Lumpur
22	GK	Mohd Syamsuri Mustafa	6 February 1981 (aged 23)		(Malaysia) Terengganu
23	FW	Mohd Nor Ismail	20 August 1982 (aged 22)		(Malaysia) Kuala Lumpur
25	FW	Muhamad Khalid Jamlus	23 February 1977 (aged 27)		(Malaysia) Perak

=== Thailand ===
Coach: (Germany) Sigfried Held

No.	Pos.	Player	Date of birth (age)	Caps	Club
1	GK	Sinthaweechai Hathairattanakool	23 March 1982 (aged 22)		(Thailand) Tobacco Monopoly
2	DF	Anon Nanok	30 March 1983 (aged 21)		(Thailand) Krung Thai Bank
3	DF	Niweat Siriwong	18 July 1977 (aged 27)		(Vietnam) Đông Á Bank
4	DF	Nontapan Jeansatawong	9 February 1982 (aged 22)		(Thailand) Osotspa
5	DF	Nakarin Fuplook	14 November 1983 (aged 21)		(Thailand) Bangkok Bank
6	DF	Jetsada Jitsawad	5 August 1980 (aged 24)		(Thailand) Tobacco Monopoly
7	DF	Rungroj Sawangsri	1 August 1981 (aged 23)		(Thailand) Krung Thai Bank
8	MF	Therdsak Chaiman	29 September 1973 (aged 31)		(Vietnam) Đông Á Bank
9	FW	Sarayoot Chaikamdee	24 September 1981 (aged 23)		Port Authority of Thailand
10	MF	Sakda Joemdee	7 April 1982 (aged 22)		(Vietnam) Đông Á Bank
11	DF	Songsak Chaisamak	10 July 1983 (aged 21)		Port Authority of Thailand
12	MF	Weerayut Jitkuntod	1 February 1984 (aged 20)		(Thailand) Tobacco Monopoly
13	MF	Kittisak Siriwan	18 July 1983 (aged 21)		(Thailand) Bangkok University
14	FW	Piyawat Thongman	23 October 1982 (aged 22)		(Thailand) Krung Thai Bank
15	MF	Sarif Sainui	15 April 1980 (aged 24)		(Thailand) Bangkok University
16	FW	Suriya Domtaisong	20 January 1981 (aged 23)		(Thailand) Bangkok University
17	MF	Ittipol Poolsap	4 August 1984 (aged 20)		(Thailand) Tobacco Monopoly
18	GK	Siwarak Tedsungnoen	20 April 1984 (aged 20)		(Thailand) Bangkok Bank
19	MF	Yuttajak Kornchan	31 May 1982 (aged 22)		(Vietnam) Hoàng Anh Gia Lai
20	DF	Narasak Saisang	3 December 1983 (aged 21)		(Thailand) Rajnavy Rayong
21	FW	Banluesak Yodyingyong	3 February 1983 (aged 21)		(Thailand) Rajnavy Rayong
22	GK	Narit Taweekul	30 October 1983 (aged 21)		(Thailand) Tobacco Monopoly

=== Philippines ===
Coach: Jose Ariston Caslib

No.	Pos.	Player	Date of birth (age)	Caps	Club
1	GK	Ref Cuaresma	31 October 1982 (aged 22)		(Philippines) Philippine Navy
2	DF	Bervic Italia	27 April 1982 (aged 22)		(Philippines) Philippine Navy
3	DF	Wilson de la Cruz	8 May 1979 (aged 25)		(Philippines) Philippine Army
4	MF	Jesan Candolesa	15 June 1982 (aged 22)		(Philippines) San Beda College
5	DF	Raymund Tonog (c)	9 May 1971 (aged 33)		(Philippines) Philippine Air Force
6	MF	Roel Gener	27 June 1974 (aged 30)		(Philippines) Philippine Army
7	MF	Richmond Braga	29 September 1979 (aged 25)		(Philippines) Philippine Army
8	DF	Mark Villon	6 July 1983 (aged 21)		(Philippines) San Beda College
9	FW	Chad Gould	30 September 1982 (aged 22)		(England) Swanage Town & Herston
10	MF	Chris Greatwich	30 September 1983 (aged 21)		(United States) Drury University
11	MF	Jeffrey Liman	19 May 1984 (aged 20)		(Philippines) San Beda College
12	DF	Ziggy Tonog	16 July 1976 (aged 28)		(Philippines) Philippine Air Force
13	MF	Emelio Caligdong	28 September 1982 (aged 22)		(Philippines) Philippine Air Force
14	MF	Ariel Zerrudo	10 May 1981 (aged 23)		(Philippines) Lateo
15	DF	Anton del Rosario	23 December 1981 (aged 22)		(United States) Skyline College
16	FW	Kale Alvarez	16 April 1983 (aged 21)		University of the Philippines
17	FW	Peter Jaugan	2 July 1983 (aged 21)		(Philippines) University of Mindanao
18	DF	Aly Borromeo	28 June 1983 (aged 21)		(Philippines) Kaya
19	MF	Marlon Piñero	10 January 1972 (aged 32)		(Philippines) Philippine Navy
20	FW	Ian Araneta	2 March 1982 (aged 22)		(Philippines) Philippine Air Force
21	MF	Vaughn Mellendrez	29 August 1983 (aged 21)		(Philippines) San Beda College
22	GK	Louie Casas	12 March 1986 (aged 18)		(Philippines) San Beda College

=== Timor-Leste ===
Coach: (Portugal) José Luís

No.	Pos.	Player	Date of birth (age)	Caps	Club
1	GK	Diamantino Leong	10 August 1986 (aged 18)		(Timor-Leste) Rusa Fuik
2	DF	José Antoninho Pires	24 April 1984 (aged 20)		(Timor-Leste) Cafe
3	DF	Eduardo Pereira	2 January 1972 (aged 32)		(Timor-Leste) Rusa Fuik
4	DF	Gilberto Fernandes	5 March 1974 (aged 30)		(Timor-Leste) Cafe
5	DF	Claudino Mesquita	12 June 1973 (aged 31)		(Timor-Leste) Cafe
6	MF	José João Pereira	9 October 1981 (aged 23)		(Timor-Leste) Porto Taibesi
7	MF	Estelio de Araújo	5 April 1978 (aged 26)		(Timor-Leste) Rusa Fuik
8	MF	Francisco Lam	11 August 1972 (aged 32)		(Australia) Mindo AX Darwin
9	FW	António Ximenes	23 August 1983 (aged 21)		(Timor-Leste) Cafe
10	FW	Emílio da Silva	5 April 1982 (aged 22)		(Timor-Leste) Esperança
11	FW	Nélson da Silva	2 February 1981 (aged 23)		(Timor-Leste) Esperança
12	FW	Salvador da Silva	27 May 1981 (aged 23)		(Timor-Leste) Rusa Fuik
13	MF	Simon Diamantino	2 January 1983 (aged 21)		(Australia) Casuarina
14	DF	Januário do Rego	1 October 1981 (aged 23)		(Timor-Leste) Cafe
15	DF	Charles Amaral	8 November 1981 (aged 23)		(Timor-Leste) Cafe
16	DF	Alfredo Esteves	4 June 1976 (aged 28)		(Portugal) Oliveira do Bairro
17	MF	Florencio Pereira	15 July 1985 (aged 19)		(Timor-Leste) Porto Taibesi
18	GK	Henrique Xavier	7 October 1980 (aged 24)		(Italy) Cagliari
22	FW	Victor da Costa Filipe	5 January 1976 (aged 28)		(Timor-Leste) Porto Taibesi
24	MF	Salvador do Rego	8 December 1983 (aged 20)		(Timor-Leste) Cafe
27	MF	José de Araújo	25 June 1982 (aged 22)		(Timor-Leste) Rusa Fuik
30	GK	Mario Sierra Lopes	2 January 1979 (aged 25)		(Spain) Ibiza
