= Timorese football league system =

The Timorese Football League System, also known as the football pyramid, is a series of interconnected leagues for association football clubs in Timor-Leste.

== History ==
=== Portuguese Timor era (1900–1975) ===
From 1900 to 1975, the competition was known as Campeonato Nacional de Timor and was divided into three tiers. The first tier was Campeonato Nacional da 1ª Divisão, while the second tier, Campeonato Nacional da 2ª Divisão, was divided into two regions, North and South. The third tier, Campeonato Nacional da 3ª Divisão or Campeonato Distrital da 1ª Divisão, was divided into separate districts in parallel.

Level	League(s)/Division(s)
1	Campeonato Nacional 1ª Divisão
2	Campeonato Nacional 2ª Divisão
3	Campeonato Nacional 3ª Divisão
4	Campeonato Distrital

=== Timor Timur era (1976–1999) ===
The competition was part of Perserikatan until 1994 and Liga Indonesia Second Division zone qualification from 1995 to 1999.

=== Independent era (2000–present) ===
The top division is the Super Liga (which is sometimes referred to as Level 1 of the league 'pyramid'), containing 8 clubs and best 4 clubs from Liga Pre, all of which, as of the 2010–11 season, are based in East Timor. Below the Super Liga is Timorese Liga Pre, which is divided into two groups of 4-5 clubs each: Liga Pre Group 1 and Liga Pre Group 2. The third tier is the Taça Digicel, containing 14 clubs and it is divided into three groups of 4-5 clubs each.

Level	League(s)/Division(s)
1	Super Liga Timorense
2	Timorense Liga Pre
3	Taça Digicel

In 2015, FFTL officially launched the national amateur league named Liga Futebol Amadora (LFA). Designed to allow local footballers to flourish, the LFA gives a home to amateur football in Timor Leste, and ignites the potential to create a gateway to professional football.

Level	League(s)/Division(s)
1	Liga Futebol Amadora Primeira Divisão
2	Liga Futebol Amadora Segunda Divisão

== Cup eligibility ==
Being members of a league at a particular level also affects eligibility for Cup, or single-elimination, competitions.

- Taça 12 de Novembro: Levels 1 and 2; with details 8 clubs Level 1, 13 clubs Level 2.
- LFA Super Taça: Champions of Level 1 and winner of cup competition.

== Promotion and relegation ==
1. Primeira Divisão (level 1, 8 teams): The Bottom two teams are relegated.
2. Segunda Divisão (level 2, 13 teams): The champions and runner-up are promoted.

== Men's ==
Level	League(s)/Division(s)
1	Liga Futebol Amadora Primeira Divisão; 8 clubs
	↓↑ 2 clubs
2	Liga Futebol Amadora Segunda Divisão; 12 clubs

== Top-tier champions ==
Club	Winners	Runners-up	Winning year
Fima Sporting	1	0	2005-06
Sport Laulara e Benfica	1	0	2016
AD Esperança	0	1	-
Karketu Dili FC	0	1	-
