= Vietnam national football team results (unofficial matches) =

Football results

This article provides details of unofficial football games played by the Vietnam national football team. All the games listed were not accorded the status of FIFA's official International A Matches (played against youth national teams or clubs).

== Results ==
Key
Win
Draw
Defeat

=== French Cochinchina ===
4 October 1928 Friendly	Singapore	4–0	French Cochinchina	Outram, British Singapore
		Report		Stadium: Anson Road Stadium

14 April 1930 Friendly	French Cochinchina	2–3	Siam	Saigon, French Indochina
		Report

20 April 1930 Friendly	French Cochinchina	2–1	Siam	Saigon, French Indochina
		Report

6 January 1934 Friendly	French Cochinchina	4–3	French Cambodia	Saigon, French Indochina
		Report

4 February 1934 Friendly	French Cambodia	9–1	French Cochinchina	Phnom Penh, French Indochina
		Report		Referee: M. Plasson

9 May 1936 Friendly	French Cochinchina	1–4	China	Saigon, French Indochina
		Report

2 May 1937 Friendly	French Cochinchina	1–3	Singapore	Saigon, French Indochina
		Report

23 May 1938 Friendly	Hong Kong	0–3	French Cochinchina	Causeway Bay, British Hong Kong
		Report		Stadium: Navy Ground

1 May 1939 Friendly	French Cochinchina	3–7	Singapore	Saigon, French Indochina
		Report

19 May 1940 Friendly	Singapore	5–1	French Cochinchina	Outram, British Singapore
		Report		Stadium: Anson Road Stadium

April 1942 Triangular Tournament	French Cochinchina	Unknown	Thailand	Saigon, French Indochina

=== Cochinchina ===
20 April 1947 Friendly	Hong Kong	3–2	(French Cochinchina) Cochinchina	Causeway Bay, British Hong Kong
		Report		Stadium: Navy Ground

26 March 1948 Friendly	Cochinchina (French Cochinchina)	7–0	Hong Kong	Saigon, French Indochina
		Report

28 March 1948 Coupe Robert Jobez	Cochinchina (French Cochinchina)	1–2	Hong Kong	Saigon, French Indochina
		Report

16 May 1948 Friendly	Cochinchina (French Cochinchina)	3–3	China	Saigon, French Indochina
		Report

18 May 1948 Friendly	Cochinchina (French Cochinchina)	1–3	China	Saigon, French Indochina
		Report

=== 1950s ===
3 April 1949 Hybrid friendly	Vietnam	0–4	France B	Saigon, State of Vietnam
		Report	Laborde (?); Prouff

5 April 1949 Hybrid friendly	Vietnam	1–2	France B	Saigon, State of Vietnam
	Mỹ (?)	Report	Batteux (?); Heiné

27 May 1950 Hybrid friendly	France B	5–2	Vietnam	Nice, France
	Carré 26'; Kargu 34', 52', 62', 72'	Report	Mỹ 35'; Lê Hữu Ðức 65'	Stadium: Stade Saint-Augustin; Attendance: 4,522; Referee: Vincenti

30 May 1950 Hybrid friendly	VGA Saint-Maur (France)	3–2	Vietnam	Paris, France
		Report	Lê Hữu Ðức; Auguste Dương Guichard

10 June 1950 Hybrid friendly	Helsingborgs (Sweden)	12–3	Vietnam	Helsingborgs, Sweden
		Report		Stadium: Olympia; Attendance: 8,318

26 November 1950 Hybrid friendly	Vietnam	2–3	(Sweden) Djurgårdens	Saigon, State of Vietnam
	Trọng; Auguste Dương Guichard	Report	Jeppson (?), 49' (?)

Unknown 1951 Hybrid friendly	Nice (France)	4–1	Vietnam	Algiers, French Algeria
		Report

Unknown 1951 Hybrid friendly	Rouen (France)	3–1	Vietnam	Rouen, France
		Report

Unknown 1951 Hybrid friendly	Djurgårdens (Sweden)	4–1	Vietnam	Stockholm, Sweden
		Report

15 June 1952 Hybrid friendly	Vietnam	2–2	France military	Saigon, State of Vietnam
		Report

22 June 1952 Hybrid friendly	Vietnam	0–2	France military	Hanoi, State of Vietnam
		Report		Stadium: Cột Cờ Stadium

25 January 1953 Hybrid friendly	Vietnam	1–4	(Austria) LASK	Saigon, State of Vietnam
		Report

4 April 1953 Four Teams Tournament	Vietnam	3–2	Singapore Royal Air Force	Saigon, State of Vietnam
		Report

6 April 1953 Four Teams Tournament	Vietnam	5–0	Hong Kong Royal Air Force	Saigon, State of Vietnam
		Report

16 December 1953 Hybrid friendly	Vietnam	2–3	(Sweden) Djurgårdens	Saigon, State of Vietnam
	Đỗ Quang Thạch	Report	Andersson; Eriksson; Forsberg

13 July 1954 Hybrid friendly	Vietnam	4–4	(Austria) Grazer AK	Saigon, State of Vietnam
		Report

28 November 1954 Hybrid friendly	Vietnam	2–2	(Sweden) AIK	Saigon, State of Vietnam
		Report

November 1955 Hybrid friendly	South Vietnam	0–0	Ferroviário	Saigon, South Vietnam
		Report

29 January 1956 Hybrid friendly	South Vietnam	4–1	Wiener Sport-Club	Saigon, South Vietnam
		Report

25 May 1956 Hybrid friendly	FAM Chinese XI (Federation of Malaya)	1–5	South Vietnam	Kuala Lumpur, Malaya
--:-- UTC+8		Report		Stadium: Princes Road Stadium

28 May 1956 Hybrid friendly	Selangor (Federation of Malaya)	3–7	South Vietnam	Kuala Lumpur, Malaya
--:-- UTC+8		Report		Stadium: Princes Road Stadium

7 September 1957 1957 Merdeka Tournament	Hong Kong League XI	3–1	South Vietnam	Kuala Lumpur, Malaya
--:-- UTC+8	Lau Yee 16'; Szeto Man 37'; Law Kwok Tai 58'	Report	85' (o.g.)	Stadium: Merdeka Stadium

12 January 1958 Hybrid friendly	South Vietnam	2–1	SC Wacker Wien	Saigon, South Vietnam
		Report

31 August 1958 1958 Merdeka Tournament	Hong Kong League XI	5–3	South Vietnam	Kuala Lumpur, Malaya
--:-- UTC+8				Stadium: Merdeka Stadium

14 May 1959 Hybrid friendly	Malaya - Singapore XI (Malaysia)	0–2	South Vietnam	Singapore
		Report

8 September 1959 Singapore Festival 1959	South Vietnam	3–1	(United Kingdom) Far East Air Force	Singapore
--:-- UTC+8		Report

25 November 1959 Hybrid friendly	South Vietnam	3–1	(Sweden) Djurgårdens	Saigon, South Vietnam
		Report	Ohlsson	Stadium: Cộng Hòa Stadium

=== 1960s ===
20 August 1960 Hybrid friendly	Singapore XI	1–2	South Vietnam	Singapore
		Report

12 February 1961 Hybrid friendly	South Vietnam	0–1	(Switzerland) Young Boys	Saigon, South Vietnam
		Report	Führer	Stadium: Cộng Hòa Stadium

14 February 1962 Hybrid friendly	Persija Jakarta (Indonesia)	3–4	South Vietnam	Djakarta, Indonesia
	Phạm Huỳnh Tam Lang 22' (o.g.); Soentoro 42', 76'	Report	Nguyễn Văn Quang 28'; Trịnh Ngẫu 35'; Đỗ Thới Vinh 50'; Huỳnh Văn Thuyên 74'	Stadium: Ikada Stadium; Attendance: 17,000

17 February 1962 Hybrid friendly	Persebaya-Persema combined (Indonesia)	0–2	South Vietnam	Surabaya, Indonesia
		Report	Trịnh Ngẫu 10'; Nguyễn Văn Quang 64'	Stadium: Tambaksaki Stadium

25 March 1962 Hybrid friendly	South Vietnam	2–2	(Peru) Sporting Cristal	Saigon, South Vietnam
	Trần Ta; Trần Văn Nhung	Report	Flores; Delgado	Attendance: Cộng Hòa Stadium

20 May 1962 Hybrid friendly	South Vietnam	0–2	(United Kingdom) British Army	Saigon, South Vietnam
		Report

11 September 1962 1962 Merdeka Tournament	South Vietnam	0–3	South Korea B	Kuala Lumpur, Malaysia
--:-- UTC+8		Report	Kim Sam-nak 34'; Chun Kang-moon 65', 80'	Stadium: Merdeka Stadium

23 March 1963 Hybrid friendly	Israel U-20	1–1	South Vietnam	Tel Aviv, Israel

15 August 1963 1963 Merdeka Tournament	South Vietnam	3–1	(United Kingdom) Commonwealth Forces	Kuala Lumpur, Malaysia
		Report		Stadium: Merdeka Stadium

14 October 1963 Tokyo International Sports Week 1963	South Vietnam	1–2	West Germany Amateurs	Tokyo, Japan
		Report		Stadium: Chichibunomiya Stadium

16 October 1963 Tokyo International Sports Week 1963	Japan B	1–1	South Vietnam	Tokyo, Japan
		Report		Stadium: National Stadium

9 February 1964 Hybrid friendly	South Vietnam	1–2	(Denmark) KB	Saigon, South Vietnam
		Report	Petersen	Stadium: Cộng Hòa Stadium; Attendance: 20,000; Referee: Trương Văn Ký
Note: Referee Trương Văn Ký died shortly after the game ended, due to ruptured blood vessels

23 August 1964 1964 Merdeka Tournament	South Vietnam	2–0	Japan B	Kuala Lumpur, Malaysia
--:-- UTC+8		Report		Stadium: Merdeka Stadium

6 September 1964 1964 Merdeka Tournament	South Korea B	2–1	South Vietnam	Kuala Lumpur, Malaysia
--:-- UTC+8		Report		Stadium: Merdeka Stadium

13 March 1965 Hybrid friendly	South Vietnam	1–5	(Denmark) B 1913	Saigon, South Vietnam
		Report		Stadium: Cộng Hòa Stadium

14 December 1967 Hybrid friendly	South Vietnam	1–1	(United States) Dallas Tornado	Saigon, South Vietnam
		Report

19 November 1969 1965 Merdeka Tournament	South Vietnam	2–1	Japan B	Kuala Lumpur, Malaysia
		Report		Stadium: Merdeka Stadium

19 November 1969 1969 King's Cup	South Vietnam	3–1	Western Australia	Bangkok, Thailand
	Quang Kim Phụng	Report	Hobson

=== 1970s ===
23 April 1970 1970 Friendship Cup	South Vietnam	1–1	(Hong Kong) Kowloon Motor Bus	Saigon, South Vietnam
		Report		Stadium: Cộng Hòa Stadium

January 1972 Hybrid friendly	South Vietnam	1–1	(West Germany) Hertha Zehlendorf	Saigon, South Vietnam
		Report		Stadium: Cộng Hòa Stadium

3 November 1973 1973 Vietnam National Day Tournament	Persija Jakarta (Indonesia)	4–2	South Vietnam	Saigon, South Vietnam
		Report		Stadium: Cộng Hòa Stadium

19 March 1974 1974 Marah Halim Cup	South Vietnam	3–1	(Singapore) SAFSA	Medan, Indonesia
		Report

21 March 1974 1974 Marah Halim Cup	PSMS Medan (Indonesia)	2–2	South Vietnam	Medan, Indonesia
		Report

24 March 1974 1974 Marah Halim Cup	Persib Bandung (Indonesia)	0–3	South Vietnam	Medan, Indonesia
		Report

28 March 1974 1974 Marah Halim Cup	South Vietnam	0–3	Thailand XI	Medan, Indonesia
		Report

30 March 1974 1974 Marah Halim Cup	Japan XI	1–0	South Vietnam	Medan, Indonesia
		Report

5 April 1974 1974 Marah Halim Cup	Persebaya (Indonesia)	2–0	South Vietnam	Medan, Indonesia
		Report

20 April 1974 Hybrid friendly	Khmer Republic Army	4–2	South Vietnam	Phnom Penh, Khmer Republic
--:-- UTC+7		Report		Stadium: Olympic Stadium

13 June 1974 Hybrid friendly	South Vietnam	1–4	France Amateurs	Saigon, South Vietnam
	Hồ Thanh Cang 5'	Report	Maillard 3'; Izquierdo 42'; Mesonès 66'; Fernandez 80'	Stadium: Cộng Hòa Stadium

10 November 1974 1974 Vietnam National Day Tournament Final	South Vietnam	2–0	(Indonesia) Persipura	Saigon, South Vietnam
		Report		Stadium: Cộng Hòa Stadium

13 December 1974 1974 King's Cup	South Vietnam	2–1	(Indonesia) PSM Makassar	Bangkok, Thailand

15 January 1975 Hybrid friendly	South Vietnam	1–2	(West Germany) Hertha Zehlendorf	Saigon, South Vietnam
	Kiều Văn Chảy	Report		Stadium: Cộng Hòa Stadium

December 1976 Hybrid friendly	Vietnam	1–2	East Germany Olympic	Hanoi, Vietnam
		Report		Stadium: Hàng Đẫy Stadium

27 December 1979 Hybrid friendly	Vietnam	3–0	Angola Army	Hanoi, Vietnam
	Trần Triệu Tuấn 11'; Nguyễn Thế Anh 56'; Nguyễn Cao Cường 85'			Stadium: Hàng Đẫy Stadium

=== 1980s ===
14 October 1980 Hybrid friendly	Pakhtakor (Uzbek Soviet Socialist Republic)	2–5	Vietnam	Tashkent, Soviet Union
		Report

18 October 1980 Hybrid friendly	Dinamo Samarqand (Uzbek Soviet Socialist Republic)	2–1	Vietnam	Samarqand, Soviet Union
		Report		Stadium: Dinamo Samarkand Stadium

October 1980 Hybrid friendly	Aktyubinets (Kazakh Soviet Socialist Republic)	3–2	Vietnam	Aktobe, Soviet Union
		Report		Stadium: Central Stadium

In 1983, Vietnam went on a several months tour in Hungary et Soviet Union.

24 July 1983 Hybrid friendly	Krasnaya Presnya (Russian Soviet Federative Socialist Republic)	Unknown	Vietnam	Moscow, Soviet Union
				Stadium: Krasnaya Presnya Stadium

July 1983 Hybrid friendly	Soviet Union U-18	0–0	Vietnam	Moscow, Soviet Union

=== 1990s ===
==== 1991 ====
8 October 1991 Hybrid friendly	Vietnam	2–1	(Vietnam) Hồ Chí Minh City XI	Ho Chi Minh City, Vietnam
		Report		Stadium: Thống Nhất Stadium

11 October 1991 Hybrid friendly	Vietnam	2–2	(Malaysia) Kuala Lumpur City Youth	Ho Chi Minh City, Vietnam
		Report		Stadium: Thống Nhất Stadium

15 October 1991 Hybrid friendly	Vietnam	1–1	Malaysia Olympic	Ho Chi Minh City, Vietnam
				Stadium: Thống Nhất Stadium

==== 1992 ====
In August 1992, Vietnam went on a training camp in India. None of the results of the games were recorded.

==== 1994 ====
2 September 1994 Hybrid friendly	Vietnam	1–1	(Australia) Adelaide City	Hanoi, Vietnam
	Nguyễn Hồng Sơn 40' (pen.)	Report	Vidmar 82'	Stadium: Hà Nội Stadium; Attendance: 7,000; Referee: Phú Tân (Vietnam)

29 September 1994 Hybrid friendly	Vietnam	1–1 (4–3 p)	Hong Kong U-23	Hanoi, Vietnam
				Stadium: Hà Nội Stadium

==== 1995 ====
6 January 1995 Independence Cup	Vietnam	Unknown	(South Korea) Housing & Commercial Bank	Ho Chi Minh City, Vietnam
		Report		Stadium: Thống Nhất Stadium

8 January 1995 Independence Cup	Vietnam	Unknown	Central Vietnam XI	Ho Chi Minh City, Vietnam
		Report		Stadium: Thống Nhất Stadium

10 January 1995 Independence Cup	Bayi (China)	Unknown	Vietnam	Ho Chi Minh City, Vietnam
		Report		Stadium: Thống Nhất Stadium

In summer 1995, Vietnam went to a training camp in Germany and Switzerland to prepare for the 1995 SEA Games. Only the matches against SC Freiburg and Wiesendangen are known.

August 1995 Hybrid friendly	SC Freiburg (Germany)	6–1	Vietnam	Freiburg, Germany
		Report		Stadium: Dreisamstadion; Attendance: 10,000

August 1995 Hybrid friendly	Wiesendangen (Switzerland)	Unknown	Vietnam	Wiesendangen, Switzerland
		Report

September 1995 Hybrid friendly	Vietnam	1–0	(Federal Republic of Yugoslavia) FK Heroj	Ho Chi Minh City, Vietnam
	Trần Minh Chiến	Report		Stadium: Thống Nhất Stadium

November 1995 Ho Chi Minh City Cup	Vietnam	0–1	(Vietnam) Hanoi XI	Ho Chi Minh City, Vietnam
		Report		Stadium: Thống Nhất Stadium

November 1995 Ho Chi Minh City Cup	Vietnam	1–0	(South Korea) Kookmin Bank	Ho Chi Minh City, Vietnam
	Trần Minh Chiến	Report		Stadium: Thống Nhất Stadium

November 1995 Ho Chi Minh City Cup	Vietnam	1–3	(Vietnam) Ho Chi Minh City XI	Ho Chi Minh City, Vietnam
		Report		Stadium: Thống Nhất Stadium

==== 1996 ====
5 May 1996 Hybrid friendly	Vietnam	2–3	(England) Middlesex Wanderers	Hanoi, Vietnam
		Report		Stadium: Hà Nội Stadium

12 May 1996 Hybrid friendly	Vietnam	2–1	(England) Middlesex Wanderers	Ho Chi Minh City, Vietnam
		Report		Stadium: Thống Nhất Stadium

4 June 1996 Hybrid friendly	Vietnam	1–2	(Italy) Juventus	Hanoi, Vietnam
	Võ Hoàng Bửu 67'	Report	Vialli 47'; Parente 57'	Stadium: Hà Nội Stadium; Attendance: 22,000; Referee: Nguyễn Tuấn Hùng (Vietnam)

In July 1996, Vietnam went to Germany and Switzerland for a nine-weeks training camp to prepare for the 1996 AFF Championship. Some of the results in Germany are known.

July 1996 Hybrid friendly	TSV Kropp (Germany)	1–4	Vietnam	Delmenhorst, Germany
		Report		Stadium: TSV Drangstedt

9 July 1996 Hybrid friendly	TSV Drangstedt (Germany)	1–6	Vietnam	Delmenhorst, Germany
		Report

16 July 1996 Hybrid friendly	VFB Stuttgart (Germany)	2–1	Vietnam	Gaggenau, Germany
18:30	Grimm; Hagner	Report	Nguyễn Hồng Sơn	Attendance: Traischbachstadion

13 December 1996 Haiphong Open Tournament	Vietnam	0–1	(Estonia) Flora Talinn	Haiphong, Vietnam
		Report		Stadium: Lạch Tray Stadium

15 December 1996 Haiphong Open Tournament	Vietnam	Unknown	Laos Army	Haiphong, Vietnam
		Report		Stadium: Lạch Tray Stadium

17 December 1996 Haiphong Open Tournament	Công An Hải Phòng (Vietnam)	Unknown	Vietnam	Haiphong, Vietnam
		Report		Stadium: Lạch Tray Stadium

19 December 1996 Haiphong Open Tournament	Flora Talinn (Estonia)	3–1	Vietnam	Haiphong, Vietnam
		Report		Stadium: Lạch Tray Stadium

==== 1997 ====
February 1997 Hybrid friendly	Vietnam Olympic	0–1	Vietnam	Ho Chi Minh City, Vietnam
		Report	Đặng Phương Nam 53'	Stadium: Thống Nhất Stadium

April 1997 Hybrid friendly	Vietnam	3–0	(Vietnam) Tổng Cục Đường Sắt	Hanoi, Vietnam
		Report

In April 1997, Vietnam went on a training camp in Uzbekistan to prepare for the 1998 FIFA World Cup qualification.

25 April 1997 Hybrid friendly	Navbahor Namangan (Uzbekistan)	5–0	Vietnam	Namangan, Uzbekistan
		Report

27 April 1997 Hybrid friendly	Bukhara (Uzbekistan)	1–2	Vietnam	Tashkent, Uzbekistan
		Report

30 April 1997 Hybrid friendly	Dustlik (Uzbekistan)	1–0	Vietnam	Tashkent, Uzbekistan
		Report		Attendance: 6,000

==== 1998 ====
17 May 1998 Hybrid friendly	Vietnam	1–2	(France) Guingamp	Hanoi, Vietnam
	Văn Sỹ Hùng	Report	Michel; Tasfaout	Stadium: Hàng Đẫy Stadium

25 May 1998 Hybrid friendly	Vietnam	1–2	(Brazil) Botafogo	Hanoi, Vietnam
	Nguyễn Đức Thắng 17'	Report		Stadium: Hàng Đẫy Stadium

In August 1998, Vietnam went to a 1-month training camp in Austria to prepare for the 1998 AFF Championship. Only two games from this trip is known.

August 1998 Hybrid friendly	Floridsdorfer AC (Austria)	Unknown	Vietnam	Wien, Austria
		Report

25 August 1998 Hybrid friendly	Admira Wacker Mödling (Austria)	4–1	Vietnam	Maria Enzersdorf, Austria
		Report		Stadium: Bundesstadion Südstadt

==== 1999 ====
12 January 1999 Hybrid friendly	Vietnam	0–0	Iraq U-23	Hanoi, Vietnam
				Stadium: Hàng Đẫy Stadium

22 January 1999 Hybrid friendly	Vietnam	0–3	Iraq U-23	Ho Chi Minh City, Vietnam
			Hussein; Abdul-Jabbar; Ahmed	Stadium: Thống Nhất Stadium

3 June 1999 Continents Cup	Vietnam	0–1	(Netherlands) Ajax	Ho Chi Minh City, Vietnam
				Stadium: Thống Nhất Stadium

5 June 1999 Continents Cup	Vietnam	1–5	(Brazil) Atlético Mineiro	Ho Chi Minh City, Vietnam
	Đặng Phương Nam 27'			Stadium: Thống Nhất Stadium

20 June 1999 Hybrid friendly	Lâm Đồng (Vietnam)	1–0	Vietnam	Lâm Đồng, Vietnam
				Stadium: Đà Lạt Stadium

30 June 1999 Hybrid friendly	Vietnam	2–3	(Japan) Kansai University	Ho Chi Minh City, Vietnam
	Lê Huỳnh Đức 17'; Nguyễn Hồng Sơn 60'			Stadium: Thống Nhất Stadium

In July 1999, Vietnam went to a training camp in France and Germany to prepare for the 1999 SEA Games.

6 July 1999 Hybrid friendly	VfR Mannheim (Germany)	3–2	Vietnam	Karlsruhe, Germany
				Stadium: Wildparkstadion

8 July 1999 Hybrid friendly	Karlsruher SC (Germany)	3–2	Vietnam	Karlsruhe, Germany
				Stadium: Wildparkstadion

15 July 1999 Hybrid friendly	Nancy (France)	2–2	Vietnam	Vittel, France
			Văn Sỹ Hùng 16'; Đặng Phương Nam 86'	Stadium: Stade Municipal Jean Bouloumié

18 July 1999 Hybrid friendly	Raon-l'Étape (France)	3–2	Vietnam	Vittel, France
			Triệu Quang Hà 14'; Nguyễn Văn Sỹ 36'	Stadium: Stade Municipal Jean Bouloumié

=== 2000s ===
==== 2000 ====
5 January 2000 Hybrid friendly	Nam Định (Vietnam)	0–0	Vietnam	Nam Định, Vietnam
				Stadium: Chùa Cuối Stadium

29 August 2000 LG Cup	Vietnam	1–0	(China) Yunnan Hongta	Ho Chi Minh City, Vietnam
	Nguyễn Hồng Sơn 44'	Report		Stadium: Thống Nhất Stadium

31 August 2000 LG Cup	Vietnam	6–2	(Vietnam) Hồ Chí Minh City XI	Ho Chi Minh City, Vietnam
	Lê Huỳnh Đức 10', 15', 22', 30'; Nguyễn Tuấn Thành 17', 77'	Report	Hoàng Hùng 16'; Đặng Ngọc Việt 75'	Stadium: Thống Nhất Stadium

9 September 2000 LG Cup	Vietnam	1–2	(Australia) Parramatta Power	Ho Chi Minh City, Vietnam
		Report		Stadium: Thống Nhất Stadium

In 2000, Vietnam went for a training camp in France, before returning to Ho Chi Minh City, where they played friendly matches against local teams.

26 September 2000 Hybrid friendly	SR Saint-Dié (France)	1–4	Vietnam	Saint-Dié-des-Vosges, France
			Nguyễn Việt Thắng 41'; Nguyễn Tuấn Thành 50', 71'; Võ Hoàng Bửu 85'	Stadium: Stade Émile Jeanpierre

3 October 2000 Hybrid friendly	Raon-l'Étape (France)	1–0	Vietnam	Raon-l'Étape, France
				Stadium: Stade Pual-Gasser

16 October 2000 Hybrid friendly	Cảng Sài Gòn (Vietnam)	2–3	Vietnam	Ho Chi Minh City, Vietnam
			Văn Sỹ Thủy 39'; Trần Thúc Vũ 52'; Nguyễn Tuấn Thành 70'

23 October 2000 Hybrid friendly	Công An Hồ Chí Minh City (Vietnam)	0–4	Vietnam	Ho Chi Minh City, Vietnam
			Văn Sỹ Thủy; Nguyễn Tuấn Thành; Vũ Minh Hiếu (pen.)

29 October 2000 Hybrid friendly	Hải Quan (Vietnam)	1–3	Vietnam	Ho Chi Minh City, Vietnam
			Nguyễn Hồng Sơn 29' (pen.); Lê Huỳnh Đức 34'; Nguyễn Tuấn Thành 78'

==== 2001 ====
30 January 2001 Hybrid friendly	Vietnam	1–3	(China) Guangdong Winnerway	Hanoi, Vietnam
	Phạm Hùng Dũng 75'	Report	33'; 44'; 47'	Stadium: Hàng Đẫy Stadium; Attendance: 8,000

==== 2002 ====
25 May 2002 Hybrid friendly	Vietnam	1–1	(South Korea) Suwon Samsung Bluewings	Ho Chi Minh City, Vietnam
	Lê Huỳnh Đức 75' (pen.)	Report	11'	Stadium: Thống Nhất Stadium

30 May 2002 Hybrid friendly	Vietnam	4–1	(England) Middlesex Wanderers	Ho Chi Minh City, Vietnam
	Huỳnh Hồng Sơn 23'; Lê Huỳnh Đức 28', 37'; Trần Trường Giang 80'	Report	Abott 45' (pen.)	Stadium: Thống Nhất Stadium

8 July 2002 Hybrid friendly	Yunnan Hongta B (China)	0–2	Vietnam	Kunming, China
		Report	Huỳnh Hồng Sơn; Lê Huỳnh Đức	Stadium: Kunming Tuodong Sports Center

9 July 2002 Hybrid friendly	Yunnan Hongta B (China)	1–0	Vietnam	Kunming, China
	70'	Report		Stadium: Kunming Tuodong Sports Center

2 August 2002 LG Cup	Vietnam	3–1	Indonesia	Ho Chi Minh City, Vietnam
	Huỳnh Hồng Sơn 15', 75'; Lê Huỳnh Đức 58'	Report	Kurniawan 20'	Stadium: Thống Nhất Stadium

6 August 2002 LG Cup	Vietnam	1–3	Thailand U-20	Ho Chi Minh City, Vietnam
	Lê Huỳnh Đức 72'	Report	Panai 20'; Ekaphan 75'; Kittipol 85'	Stadium: Thống Nhất Stadium

8 August 2002 LG Cup	Vietnam	3–0	Singapore U-23	Ho Chi Minh City, Vietnam
	Huỳnh Hồng Sơn 3', 27'; Lê Huỳnh Đức 28'	Report		Stadium: Thống Nhất Stadium

10 August 2002 LG Cup	Vietnam	2–3	India Olympic	Ho Chi Minh City, Vietnam
	Lê Huỳnh Đức 15'; Phùng Thanh Phương 20'	Report	Bhutia 30', 57'; Yadav 88'	Stadium: Thống Nhất Stadium

21 November 2002 Hybrid friendly	Vietnam	1–0	(Vietnam) Đông Á Bank	Ho Chi Minh City, Vietnam
	Lê Huỳnh Đức 35'	Report		Stadium: Thành Long Stadium

==== 2004 ====
11 August 2004 Hybrid friendly	Vietnam	4–0	Vietnam U-23	Hanoi, Vietnam

26 August 2004 LG Cup	Vietnam	5–0	(Vietnam) Hồ Chí Minh City XI	Ho Chi Minh City, Vietnam
19:00	Thạch Bảo Khanh 28', 71'; Lê Công Vinh 31'; Lê Huỳnh Đức 57', 67'	Report		Stadium: Thống Nhất Stadium

28 August 2004 LG Cup	Vietnam	4–5 (a.e.t.)	South Korea Universiade	Ho Chi Minh City, Vietnam
19:00	Thạch Bảo Khanh 28'; Lê Công Vinh 70'; Lê Huỳnh Đức 80'; Phạm Văn Quyến 86'	Report	Kim Shin-young 18'; Yeom Ki-hun 25', 90+2' (pen.); Choi Hyo-jin 75'; Han Seung-hyun 117'	Stadium: Thống Nhất Stadium

22 September 2004 Agribank Cup	Vietnam	2–1	Thailand Soccer League XI	Hanoi, Vietnam
	Phan Văn Tài Em 17'; Lê Công Vinh 53'	Report	Pisanu 30'	Stadium: Mỹ Đình National Stadium

24 September 2004 Agribank Cup	Vietnam	1–0	(Brazil) Santa Cruz	Hanoi, Vietnam
	Lê Công Vinh 50'	Report		Stadium: Mỹ Đình National Stadium

26 September 2004 Agribank Cup	Vietnam	1–2	(Portugal) Porto B	Hanoi, Vietnam
	N'Gako 18' (o.g.)	Report	Buzsáky 61'; Nuno 65'	Stadium: Mỹ Đình National Stadium

7 October 2004 Hybrid friendly	Vietnam	3–0	(Vietnam) Hòa Phát Hà Nội	Hanoi, Vietnam
		Report

4 November 2004 Hybrid friendly	Vietnam	1–1	(Vietnam) Hòa Phát Hà Nội	Hanoi, Vietnam
	Casset 30'	Report	Jucelio 81' (pen.)	Stadium: Mỹ Đình National Stadium

7 November 2004 Hybrid friendly	Hải Phòng (Vietnam)	2–1	Vietnam	Haiphong, Vietnam
	Nsengiyumva	Report	Phan Văn Tài Em	Stadium: Lạch Tray Stadium

3 December 2004 Hybrid friendly	Bưu Điện (Vietnam)	1–4	Vietnam	Ho Chi Minh City, Vietnam
	Nsoga 60'	Report	Nguyễn Minh Phương 31', 40'; Lê Công Vinh 43'; Đặng Văn Thành 87'	Stadium: Thành Long Stadium

==== 2005 ====
1 May 2005 Hybrid friendly	Vietnam	0–0	(Czech Republic) Slavia Prague	Hanoi, Vietnam
		Report		Stadium: Mỹ Đình National Stadium

4 May 2005 Hybrid friendly	Vietnam	2–2	(Vietnam) Hòa Phát Hà Nội	Hanoi, Vietnam
	Trần Đức Dương 27'; Lê Bật Hiếu 57'	Report	Francisco 30'; Lương Thanh Sang 47'	Stadium: National Sports Training Center I

28 May 2005 Hybrid friendly	Vietnam	2–1	(Japan) Júbilo Iwata	Hanoi, Vietnam
	Thạch Bảo Khanh 18'; Phạm Văn Quyến 48'	Report	Okamoto 60'	Stadium: Mỹ Đình National Stadium

4 June 2005 Honda Cup	Vietnam	2–2	(South Korea) Bucheon SK	Hanoi, Vietnam
16:00	Phạm Văn Quyến 11'; Thạch Bảo Khanh 87'	Report	Shin Dae-kyung 60'; Yoo Hyun-goo 71'	Stadium: Mỹ Đình National Stadium

6 June 2005 Honda Cup	Vietnam	1–1	Indonesia U-23	Hanoi, Vietnam
18:00	Phan Văn Tài Em 49'	Report	Prasetyo 89'	Stadium: Mỹ Đình National Stadium

8 June 2005 Honda Cup	Vietnam	1–0	(Spain) Barcelona B	Hanoi, Vietnam
20:00	Phan Thanh Bình 77'	Report		Stadium: Mỹ Đình National Stadium

==== 2006 ====
16 April 2006 VTV-T&T Cup	Vietnam	2–2	Uzbekistan U-23	Hanoi, Vietnam
18:00	Phan Thanh Bình 12'; Nguyễn Minh Phương 66'	Report	Erkinov 29', 49'	Stadium: Mỹ Đình National Stadium

18 April 2006 VTV-T&T Cup	Australia U-23	0–0	Vietnam	Hanoi, Vietnam
18:00		Report		Stadium: Mỹ Đình National Stadium

20 April 2006 VTV-T&T Cup	Vietnam	1–1	Iran U-23	Hanoi, Vietnam
18:00	Lê Hồng Minh 44'	Report	Shojaei 25'	Stadium: Mỹ Đình National Stadium

From 27 September to 6 October 2006, Vietnam went for a training camp in Japan.

3 October 2006 Hybrid friendly	Sony Sendai (Japan)	0–3	Vietnam	Tokyo, Japan
		Report	Lê Công Vinh 10'; Nguyễn Anh Đức 48'; Phan Thanh Bình 67'

5 October 2006 Hybrid friendly	Sagawa Express Tokyo (Japan)	3–6	Vietnam	Tokyo, Japan
	? 31' ? 87' ? 90+1'	Report	Lê Công Vinh 33'; Nguyễn Văn Biển 35'; Đặng Văn Thành 67', 69'; Thạch Bảo Khanh 81'; Nguyễn Anh Đức 85'

18 October 2006 Hybrid friendly	Vietnam	2–1	(Vietnam) MH Hải Phòng	Hanoi, Vietnam
	Vũ Duy Hoàng; Đặng Văn Thành	Report		Stadium: Mỹ Đình National Stadium

21 October 2006 Hybrid friendly	Vietnam	4–0	(Vietnam) Nam Định	Hanoi, Vietnam
		Report		Stadium: Mỹ Đình National Stadium

25 October 2006 Agribank Cup	Vietnam	1–0	New Zealand A	Hanoi, Vietnam
	Lê Công Vinh 16'	Report		Stadium: Mỹ Đình National Stadium

27 October 2006 Agribank Cup	Bahrain U-21	0–2	Vietnam	Hanoi, Vietnam
		Report	Nguyễn Anh Đức 13'; Nguyễn Minh Phương 76'	Stadium: Mỹ Đình National Stadium

29 October 2006 Agribank Cup	Vietnam	2–2	Thailand Olympic	Hanoi, Vietnam
	Phùng Văn Nhiên 56'; Lê Công Vinh 67'	Report	Thonglao 71'; Thana 73'	Stadium: Mỹ Đình National Stadium

19 December 2006 Hybrid friendly	Vietnam	1–0	(Vietnam) MH Hải Phòng	Hanoi, Vietnam
	Đặng Văn Thành 21'	Report		Stadium: National Sports Training Center I

20 December 2006 Hybrid friendly	Vietnam	1–0	(Vietnam) ĐPM Nam Định	Hanoi, Vietnam
	Lê Công Vinh 10'	Report		Stadium: National Sports Training Center I

==== 2007 ====
7 July 2007 Hybrid friendly	Vietnam	3–0	(Vietnam) Thể Công	Hanoi, Vietnam

==== 2008 ====
6 July 2008 Hybrid friendly	China Olympic	3–2	Vietnam	Shenyang, China
	Gao Lin 31'; Yuan Weiwei 85'; Lê Phước Tứ 88' (o.g.)	Report	Nguyễn Việt Thắng 39' (pen.); Nguyễn Vũ Phong 90+2'	Stadium: Shenyang Olympic Sports Center Stadium

1 August 2008 Hybrid friendly	Vietnam	0–2	Brazil Olympic	Hanoi, Vietnam
		Report	Pato 5'; Neves 81'	Stadium: Mỹ Đình National Stadium; Attendance: 40,000

3 October 2008 Ho Chi Minh City Cup	South Korea Universiade	1–0	Vietnam	Ho Chi Minh City, Vietnam
	Shin Seung-pil 62'	Report		Stadium: Thống Nhất Stadium

==== 2009 ====
14 May 2009 Hybrid friendly	Vietnam	1–0	(Greece) Olympiacos	Hanoi, Vietnam
19:00	Nguyễn Quang Hải 88'	Report		Stadium: Mỹ Đình National Stadium

22 October 2009 Ho Chi Minh City Cup	South Korea Universiade	2–0	Vietnam	Ho Chi Minh City, Vietnam
18:15	Kim Byung-oh 45', 89'	Report		Stadium: Thống Nhất Stadium

22 December 2009 Hybrid friendly	Vietnam	1–1	(Vietnam) T&T Hà Nội	Hanoi, Vietnam
	Nguyễn Thành Lương	Report	Ngũ Chí Thắng	Stadium: Mỹ Đình National Stadium

24 December 2009 Hybrid friendly	Xi Măng Hải Phòng (Vietnam)	2–4	Vietnam	Haiphong, Vietnam
	Leandro 45+2'; Trần Đức Dương 60'	Report	Phan Thanh Hưng 60'; Nguyễn Quang Hải 77'; Trần Duy Quang 79'; Nguyễn Vũ Phong 86'	Stadium: Lạch Tray Stadium

=== 2010s ===
==== 2010 ====
2 January 2010 Hybrid friendly	Hòa Phát Hà Nội (Vietnam)	2–3	Vietnam	Hanoi, Vietnam
				Stadium: Hàng Đẫy Stadium

12 May 2010 Hybrid friendly	Vietnam	0–2	(Germany) Eintracht Frankfurt	Hanoi, Vietnam
19:00		Report	Meier 70'; Altintop 72'	Stadium: Mỹ Đình National Stadium

20 September 2010 Millennial Anniversary of Hanoi Cup	Vietnam	3–0	Kuwait U-23	Hanoi, Vietnam
19:00	Nguyễn Việt Thắng 45' (pen.); Nguyễn Minh Phương 66'; Nguyễn Trọng Hoàng 84'	Report		Stadium: Mỹ Đình National Stadium; Attendance: 40,000

22 September 2010 Millennial Anniversary of Hanoi Cup	Australia U-23	2–0	Vietnam	Hanoi, Vietnam
19:00	Brown 19'; Hoffman 36'	Report		Stadium: Mỹ Đình National Stadium; Attendance: 20,000

2 November 2010 VFF Cup	Vietnam	0–2	South Korea Universiade	Hanoi, Vietnam
19:00		Report	Jung Woo-young 62'; Kim Min-je 90'	Stadium: Mỹ Đình National Stadium

13 November 2010 Hybrid friendly	Vicem Hải Phòng (Vietnam)	2–2	Vietnam	Haiphong, Vietnam
		Report		Stadium: Lạch Tray Stadium

23 November 2010 Hybrid friendly	Sông Lam Nghệ An (Vietnam)	1–1	Vietnam	Nghệ An, Vietnam
				Stadium: Vinh Stadium

==== 2011 ====
19 June 2011 Hybrid friendly	Vietnam	1–1	(Vietnam) Đồng Nai Berjaya	Ho Chi Minh City, Vietnam
				Stadium: Thống Nhất Stadium

24 June 2011 Hybrid friendly	Vietnam	1–3	(Vietnam) Đồng Tâm Long An	Ho Chi Minh City, Vietnam
	Lê Công Vinh 15'	Report	Phan Thanh Bình 7'; Carlos 55'; Gerry 60'	Stadium: Thống Nhất Stadium

==== 2012 ====
28 October 2012 VFF Cup	Vietnam	1–1	South Korea Universiade	Ho Chi Minh City, Vietnam
	Nguyễn Văn Quyết 57'	Report	Kim Bong-Rae 40' (pen.)	Stadium: Thống Nhất Stadium; Attendance: 12,000

17 November 2012 Hybrid friendly	Khatoco Khánh Hòa (Vietnam)	1–1	Vietnam	Khánh Hòa, Vietnam
16:00 UTC+7	Lê Văn Tân 48'	Report	Lê Công Vinh 26'	Stadium: Nha Trang Stadium

==== 2013 ====
26 January 2013 Hybrid friendly	Vicem Hải Phòng (Vietnam)	0–2	Vietnam	Haiphong, Vietnam
16:00 UTC+7		Report	Nguyễn Gia Từ 42'; Hoàng Danh Ngọc 90'	Stadium: Lạch Tray Stadium

28 January 2013 Hybrid friendly	Hà Nội T&T (Vietnam)	1–2	Vietnam	Hanoi, Vietnam
17:00 UTC+7	Samson 10'	Report	Huỳnh Quốc Anh 22'; Nguyễn Gia Từ 35'	Stadium: Hàng Đẫy Stadium

31 January 2013 Hybrid friendly	Vietnam	2–1	(South Korea) Ulsan Hyundai Mipo Dolphin	Hanoi, Vietnam
18:00 UTC+7	Huỳnh Quốc Anh 17'; Mạc Hồng Quân 71'	Report	Lee Jae-Won 19'	Stadium: Hàng Đẫy Stadium; Referee: Phùng Đình Dũng (Vietnam)

16 March 2013 Hybrid friendly	Vietnam	4–1	(Vietnam) Hà Nội T&T	Hà Nam, Vietnam
17:30 UTC+7	Mạc Hồng Quân 6', 35'; Nguyễn Văn Quyết 9'; Lê Tấn Tài 25'	Report	Nguyễn Tiến Dũng 57'	Stadium: Hà Nam Stadium

17 July 2013 Hybrid friendly	Vietnam	1–7	(England) Arsenal	Hanoi, Vietnam
19:00 UTC+7	Trần Mạnh Dũng 78'	Report	Giroud 5', 44', 45+1'; Oxlade-Chamberlain 46'; Akpom 56', 59'; Miquel 75'	Stadium: Mỹ Đình National Stadium; Attendance: 40,000; Referee: Leow Thiam Hoe (Singapore)

11 October 2013 Hybrid friendly	Al-Arabi (Qatar)	0–2	Vietnam	Doha, Qatar
18:15 UTC+3		Report	Lê Văn Thắng 5'; Đinh Thanh Trung 47'	Stadium: Grand Hamad Stadium

10 November 2013 Hybrid friendly	Vissai Ninh Bình (Vietnam)	0–0	Vietnam	Ninh Bình, Vietnam
		Report		Stadium: Ninh Bình Stadium

==== 2014 ====
2 March 2014 Hybrid friendly	Vietnam	0–0	South Korea Universiade	Hanoi, Vietnam
16:00 UTC+7		Report		Stadium: Hàng Đẫy Stadium; Referee: Phùng Đình Dũng (Vietnam)

2 September 2014 Hybrid friendly	Vietnam	3–1	Vietnam Olympic	Hanoi, Vietnam
17:00 UTC+7	Lê Tấn Tài; Nguyễn Hải Anh; Lê Công Vinh	Report	Mạc Hồng Quân 37'	Stadium: Hàng Đẫy Stadium

In October 2014, Vietnam went for a 20-days training camp in Osaka, Japan to prepare for the 2014 AFF Championship.

8 October 2014 Hybrid friendly	Japan Universiade	3–1	Vietnam	Osaka, Japan
	? 11' ? 38' ? 50'	Report	Nguyễn Vũ Phong 69'	Stadium: J-Green Sakai Sports Complex

11 October 2014 Hybrid friendly	Vissel Kobe (Japan)	5–1	Vietnam	Osaka, Japan
	Ishizu; Marquinhos ? ? ?	Report	Lê Tấn Tài	Stadium: J-Green Sakai Sports Complex

14 October 2014 Hybrid friendly	Kyogo Sanga (Japan)	3–4	Vietnam	Osaka, Japan
	? 6' ? 60' ? 64'	Report	Vũ Minh Tuấn 41'; Nguyễn Hải Anh 82'; Lê Công Vinh 88', 90'	Stadium: J-Green Sakai Sports Complex

29 October 2014 Hybrid friendly	Vietnam	3–0	Bahrain U-23	Ho Chi Minh City, Vietnam
18:00 UTC+7	Nguyễn Anh Đức 11'; Nguyễn Văn Quyết 79'; Đinh Thanh Trung 90+4'	Report		Stadium: Thống Nhất Stadium; Referee: Võ Minh Trí (Vietnam)

3 November 2014 Hybrid friendly	Vietnam	4–0	(Vietnam) QNK Quảng Nam	Ho Chi Minh City, Vietnam
18:00 UTC+7	Nguyễn Văn Quyết (?); Nguyễn Hải Anh (?); Trần Đình Thắng (?)	Report		Stadium: Thống Nhất Stadium

4 November 2014 Hybrid friendly	Vietnam	3–0	South Korea Universiade	Ho Chi Minh City, Vietnam
18:00 UTC+7	Vũ Minh Tuấn 11', 15'; Nguyễn Văn Quyết 17'	Report		Stadium: Thống Nhất Stadium; Referee: Đinh Văn Dũng (Vietnam)

==== 2015 ====
10 May 2015 Hybrid friendly	Vietnam	3–0	Vietnam U-23	Hanoi, Vietnam
17:00 UTC+7	Nguyễn Hải Anh 17'; Lê Công Vinh 47', 81' (pen.)	Report		Stadium: Mỹ Đình National Stadium

27 July 2015 Hybrid friendly	Vietnam	1–8	Manchester City	Hanoi, Vietnam
19:00 UTC+7	Nguyễn Văn Quyết 90+1'	Report	Kolarov 11', 51' (pen.); Sterling 19', 30'; Silva 21', 66'; Lopes 73'; Pozo 79'	Stadium: Mỹ Đình National Stadium; Referee: Nagor Amir Noor Mohamed (Malaysia)

==== 2016 ====
16 March 2016 Hybrid friendly	Hà Nội T&T (Vietnam)	0–0	Vietnam	Hanoi, Vietnam
19:00 UTC+7		Report		Stadium: Hàng Đẫy Stadium

19 March 2016 Hybrid friendly	Vietnam	4–0	(Vietnam) Than Quảng Ninh	Hanoi, Vietnam
19:00 UTC+7	Lê Công Vinh 3', 69', 71'; Trần Đình Đồng 90'	Report		Stadium: Hàng Đẫy Stadium

25 May 2016 Hybrid friendly	Vietnam	0–0	Vietnam U-21	Hanoi, Vietnam
15:00 UTC+7		Report		Stadium: Vietnam Youth Football Training Center

In October 2016, Vietnam went for a 2-weeks training camp in Paju, South Korea to prepare for the 2016 AFF Championship.

20 October 2016 Hybrid friendly	FC Seoul (South Korea)	0–3	Vietnam	Paju, South Korea
15:00 UTC+9		Report	Nguyễn Văn Quyết 37', 78'; Vũ Minh Tuấn 50'	Stadium: Paju National Football Center

25 October 2016 Hybrid friendly	Jeonju University (South Korea)	1–1	Vietnam	Paju, South Korea
15:00 UTC+9	? 65'	Report	Hoàng Đình Tùng 28'	Stadium: Paju National Football Center

27 October 2016 Hybrid friendly	Pocheon Citizen (South Korea)	2–5	Vietnam	Paju, South Korea
15:00 UTC+9	? 50' ? 74'	Report	Nguyễn Văn Quyết 33'; Lê Công Vinh 42', 58'; Đặng Quang Huy 75'; Đinh Thanh Trung 79'	Stadium: Paju National Football Center

12 November 2016 Hybrid friendly	Vietnam	0–0	Avispa Fukuoka	Cần Thơ, Vietnam
18:00 UTC+7		Report		Stadium: Cần Thơ Stadium

==== 2017 ====
9 June 2017 Hybrid friendly	Hồ Chí Minh City (Vietnam)	3–2	Vietnam	Ho Chi Minh City, Vietnam
15:00 UTC+7		Report	Đinh Thanh Trung; Nguyễn Công Phượng	Stadium: Ho Chi Minh City Police Sports Center

==== 2018 ====
In October 2018, Vietnam returned to Paju, South Korea after 2 years, in order to prepare for the 2018 AFF Championship.

22 October 2018 Hybrid friendly	Incheon United (South Korea)	2–1	Vietnam	Paju, South Korea
15:00 UTC+9	Park Jong-jin 47'; Kim Hyun-jin 72'	Report	Nguyễn Văn Quyết 50'	Stadium: Paju National Football Center

25 October 2018 Hybrid friendly	FC Seoul (South Korea)	1–2	Vietnam	Paju, South Korea
15:00 UTC+9	Lee Woong-hee 43'	Report	Đinh Thanh Trung 36'; Nguyễn Công Phượng 80'	Stadium: Paju National Football Center

29 October 2018 Hybrid friendly	Seoul E-Land (South Korea)	2–0	Vietnam	Paju, South Korea
15:00 UTC+9	An Dong-hyeok 42'; An Sung-bin 49'	Report		Stadium: Paju National Football Center

=== 2020s ===
==== 2020 ====
Due to the spread of COVID-19 pandemic worldwide in 2020, Vietnam was unable to play matches against international opponents.

23 December 2020 Hybrid friendly	Vietnam	3–2	Vietnam U-23	Quảng Ninh, Vietnam
18:00 UTC+7	Nguyễn Văn Quyết 26'; Lương Xuân Trường 57' (pen.); Hà Đức Chinh 78'		Trần Văn Đạt 21'; Nguyễn Hữu Thắng 52' (pen.)	Stadium: Cẩm Phả Stadium

27 December 2020 Hybrid friendly	Vietnam	2–2	Vietnam U-23	Phú Thọ, Vietnam
18:00 UTC+7	Vũ Văn Thanh 32' (pen.); Nguyễn Quang Hải 39'		Bùi Hoàng Việt Anh 29'; Hồ Thanh Minh 80'	Stadium: Việt Trì Stadium; Attendance: 20,000

==== 2022 ====
30 November 2022 2022 BD SEA Tour	Vietnam	2–1	Borussia Dortmund	Hanoi, Vietnam
19:00 UTC+7	Nguyễn Tiến Linh 36'; Phạm Tuấn Hải 90' (pen.)	Report	Malen 13'	Stadium: Mỹ Đình National Stadium; Referee: Nazmi Nasaruddin (Malaysia)

==== 2024 ====
9 October 2024 Hybrid friendly	Vietnam	3–2	Thép Xanh Nam Định	Hanoi, Vietnam
17:00 UTC+7	Nguyễn Thái Sơn; Bùi Vĩ Hào	Report	Silva; Wálber	Stadium: Vietnam Youth Football Training Center

In November 2024, six years after the last trip to South Korea, Vietnam returned to the country for a training camp in Gyeongju to prepare for the 2024 ASEAN Championship.

27 November 2024 Hybrid friendly	Ulsan Citizen	0–2	Vietnam	Gyeongju, South Korea
10:30 UTC+9		Report	Nguyễn Tiến Linh 44'; Phạm Tuấn Hải 81'	Stadium: Gyeongju Dome

29 November 2024 Hybrid friendly	Daegu	0–2	Vietnam	Gyeongju, South Korea
14:00 UTC+9		Report	Nguyễn Quang Hải 44'; Nguyễn Hai Long 84'	Stadium: Gyeongju Dome

1 December 2024 Hybrid friendly	Jeonbuk Hyundai Motors	1–3	Vietnam	Gyeongju, South Korea
14:00 UTC+9	56'	Report	Nguyễn Quang Hải 10'; Đinh Thanh Bình 29'; Đỗ Duy Mạnh 89'	Stadium: Gyeongju Dome

==== 2025 ====
4 June 2025 Hybrid friendly	Vietnam	2–1	Vietnam U-23	Hanoi, Vietnam
16:00 UTC+7	Nguyễn Hai Long; Châu Ngọc Quang	Report	Lê Văn Thuận	Stadium: Vietnam Youth Football Training Center; Attendance: 0

4 September 2025 Hybrid friendly	Vietnam	0–4	Thép Xanh Nam Định	Hanoi, Vietnam
17:00 UTC+7		Report	Rômulo; Eid; Hudlin	Stadium: Vietnam Youth Football Training Center

7 September 2025 Hybrid friendly	Vietnam	4–3	Công An Hà Nội	Hanoi, Vietnam
17:00 UTC+7	Nguyễn Tiến Linh 2'; Phạm Tuấn Hải 36'; Châu Ngọc Quang 70'; Nguyễn Văn Vĩ 86'	Report	Trần Đức Nam 41'; Lê Văn Đô 85', 90'	Stadium: Vietnam Youth Football Training Center

==== 2026 ====
From 2 to 14 July 2026, Vietnam went for a training camp in Incheon to prepare for the 2026 ASEAN Championship.

5 July 2026 Hybrid friendly	Siheung Citizen	0–6	Vietnam	Incheon, South Korea
--:-- UTC+9		Report	Nguyễn Trần Việt Cường 2'; Nguyễn Hai Long 31', 39'; Đỗ Hoàng Hên 48', 52'; Nguyễn Đình Bắc 83'

8 July 2026 Hybrid friendly	Yongin	1–2	Vietnam	Incheon, South Korea
--:-- UTC+9	? 42'	Report	Nguyễn Hai Long 9'; Nguyễn Xuân Son 75'

13 July 2026 Hybrid friendly	Gangwon	1–2	Vietnam	Incheon, South Korea
--:-- UTC+9	? 14' (pen.)	Report	Nguyễn Xuân Son 30'; Phạm Gia Hưng 75'
