= 2005–06 Super Liga Timorense =

Statistics of Super Liga in season 2005/2006.

== Club's ==
=== List of Participating team in Super Liga 2005/06 ===
- Académica
- AD Esperança
- ADR União
- As Lero
- Bulgaria
- Cacussa
- FC Café
- FC Irmãos Unidos
- FC Porto Taibesi
- FC Rusa Fuik
- FC Zebra
- Fima Sporting
- SLB Laulara

== First stage ==
=== Grup A ===
Pos	Club	P	W	D	L	Pts	Note
1	Fima Sporting	2	1	1	0	4	Qualified
2	FC Porto Taibesi	2	0	2	0	2	Qualified
3	FC Irmãos Unidos	2	0	1	1	1	

=== Grup B ===
Pos	Club	Note
1	FC Zebra	Qualified
2	Académica	Qualified
-	ADR União	withdrew

=== Grup C ===
Pos	Club	P	W	D	L	Pts	Note
1	FC Rusa Fuik	2	1	1	0	4	Qualified
2	FC Café	2	1	1	0	4	Qualified
3	Bulgaria	2	0	0	2	0	

=== Grup D ===
Pos	Club	P	W	D	L	Pts	Note
1	AD Esperança	2	2	0	0	6	Qualified
2	SLB Laulara	2	1	0	1	3	Qualified
3	Cacussa	2	0	0	2	0	

== Playoff ==
=== Grup E ===
Round 1

- Fima Sporting 3-1 SLB Laulara
- FC Rusa Fuik 0-0 Académica

Round 2

- Académica - Fima Sporting
- SLB Laulara - FC Rusa Fuik

Round 3

- Académica 3-2 SLB Laulara
- Fima Sporting - FC Rusa Fuik
  - Winners: Fima Sporting
  - Runners-Up: Académica

=== Grup F ===
Round 1

- FC Zebra 0-0 FC Café
- FC Porto Taibesi 0-2 AD Esperança
  - Winners: AD Esperança
  - Runners-Up: FC Zebra

== Semifinals ==
- AD Esperança 2-0 Académica
- Fima Sporting 3-2 F C Zebra

== Third place match ==
- Académica 2-0 FC Zebra

== Final ==
- Fima Sporting 0-0 (pen 5-4) AD Esperança
