= Bulgária SC =

- Full name: Bulgária Esporte Clube
- Nickname(s): O Leão (en: The Bulgária Lions)
- Ground: Municipal Stadium, Dili
- Capacity: 5,000
- League: Super Liga
- 2005–06: 3rd (Group C)
Home colours	Away colours

Bulgária Esporte Clube is a Bulgarian football club based in Dili, East Timor. The team plays in the Super Liga Timorense.
