= Diamantino Leong =

Football player

Personal information
- Full name: Diamantino Leong
- Date of birth: 8 October 1986 (age 40)
- Place of birth: Dili, East Timor, Indonesia
- Height: 1.80 m (5 ft 11 in)
- Position: Goalkeeper

Team information
- Current team: Carsae
- Number: 1

Senior career*
| Years | Team | Apps | (Gls) |
| 2004–2005 | Rusa Fuik | 3 | (0) |
| 2005–2009 | F C Zebra | | |
| 2009–2012 | Rusa Fuik | | |
| 2013–2014 | F C Zebra | | |
| 2014–2015 | Rusa Fuik | | |
| 2015–2016 | Carsae | | |
| 2016-2018 | Boavista fc Timor | | |

International career^{‡}
| 2003– | Timor-Leste | 14 | (0) |
- * Club domestic league appearances and goals ‡ National team caps and goals as of 5 November 2016

Diamantino Leong, also known as Ady or Adi (born 8 October 1986 in Dili, East Timor) is a football player. He is the current goalkeeper for the Timor-Leste national football team and Carsae FC.

== Club career ==
=== Rusa Fuik ===
In Rusa Fuik he played 3 matches in the National Championship of Timor Leste

=== Zebra Football Club ===
At the Age of 18 Leong made his senior debut for Rusa Fuik . On that match, he performed well and in national league of East Timor. During his time at Rusa Fuik he establish himself as a number one shot stopper. As a result of that he got called up to play for national team of Timor-Leste to play Tiger Cup. He played 39 matches for fc Zebra.

He plays for two giants clubs in East Timot Which is: Rusa Fuik then F.C. Zebra, besides being the head of goalkeeper Timor-Leste national football team.

== International career ==
Leong has made several appearances for the Timor-Leste national football team, including two 2010 FIFA World Cup qualifying matches. Leong made his senior international debut in the 2004 AFC Asian Cup qualification against Sri Lanka national football team on 21 March 2003 when he was aged 16 years 164 days.
