= Carl Seebald =

Austrian photographer

Carl Seebald (22 August 1878, Vienna - 21 December 1941, Vienna) was an Austrian photographer active in Vienna in the early twentieth century.

Carl (or Karl) was born in Vienna. In 1905 he registered himself as a press photographer and founded the Illustration Company Carl Seebald. He was living at 107 Währingerstraße 107 in Währing, the eighteenth district of Vienna.

During the First World War, from 1914, he was attached to the wartime press headquarters with assignments taking him to Serbia and Russia. His home address was Gäntzgasse 111, still in Währingin 1915 but he moved to Sieveringerstraße 31 in Döbling, the nineteenth district of Vienna until 1918.

By the 1920s he supplemented his work as a press photographer with studio photography. Die Woche published many of his photographs. In 1924, he co-founded the Organization of the Viennese Press, and the Free Association of Press Photo-Reporters from Austria. By 1925 he was living in Weidlingbach and from 1927 he was based at 99 Mariahilferstrasse Mariahilf in the sixth district of Vienna.

== Gallery ==
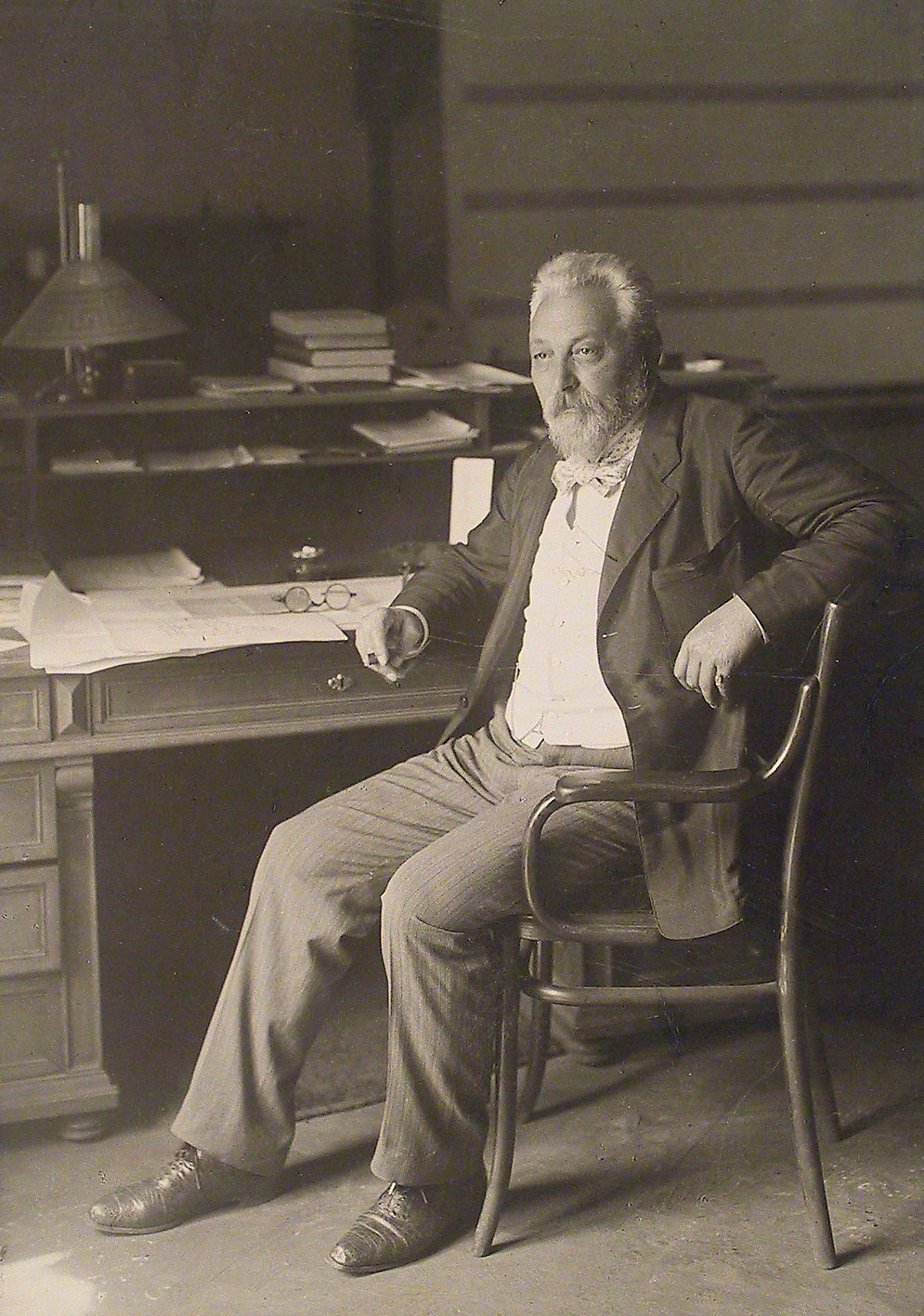
Franz Serafin Exner, 1908

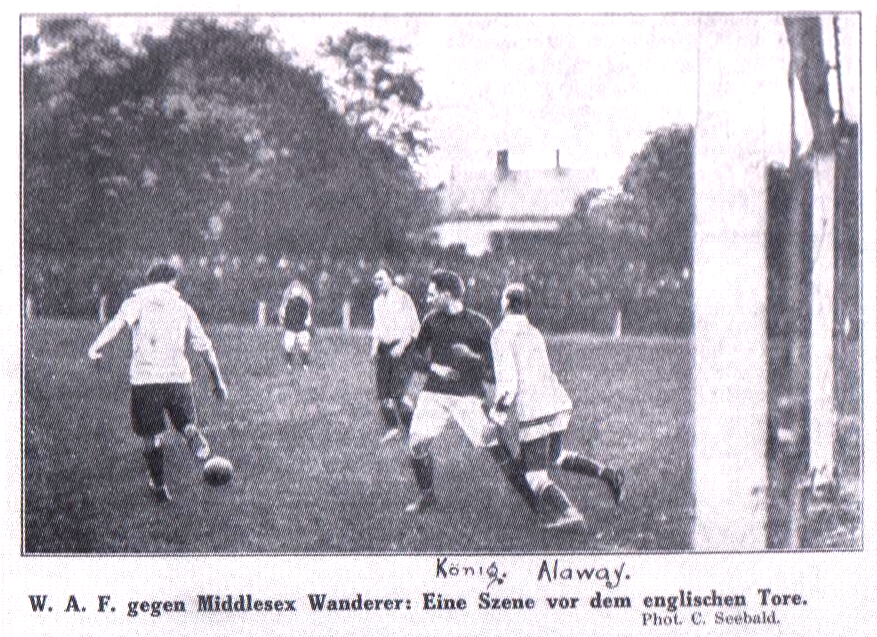
Middlesex Wanderers defending their goal from WAF, Vienna, 1912

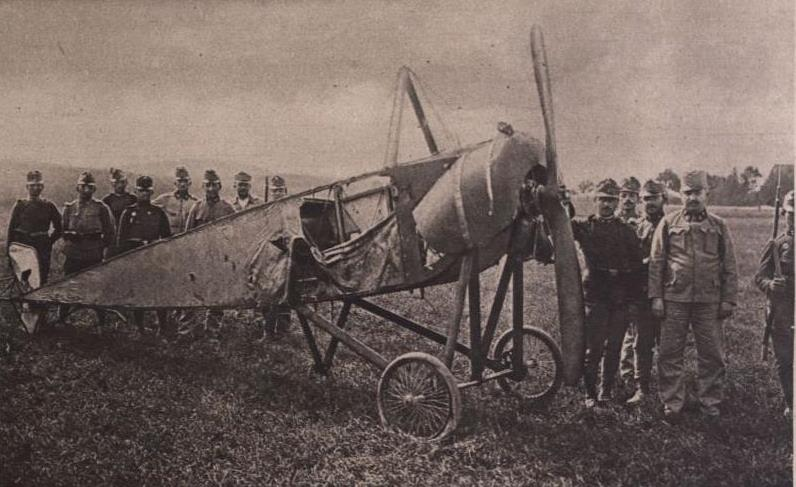
Aeroplane of the Imperial Russian Air Force shot down in September 1914
