= Kyaw Khing Win =

Myanmar footballer

Personal information
- Full name: Kyaw Khing Win
- Date of birth: December 23, 1983 (age 42)
- Position: Defender

International career
Years	Team	Apps	(Gls)
2003–	Myanmar	18	(0)

Kyaw Khing Win (born 23 December 1983) is a footballer from Myanmar. He made his first appearance for the Myanmar national football team in 2003.
