= Fima Sporting =

- Full name: Clubes de Fitun Matebian Sporting Baucau
- Nickname(s): The Baucau Eagle
- League: Super Liga Timorense
- 2005–06: Champions

Fima Sporting or Clubes de Fitun Matebian Sporting Baucau are a football team from Baucau. That play in the Super Liga Timorense.
