= Trần Văn Khánh =

Vietnamese footballer (born 1949)

Personal information
- Date of birth: 21 October 1949
- Place of birth: Thái Nguyên, French Indochina
- Height: 1.78 m (5 ft 10 in)
- Position: Goalkeeper

Senior career*
Years	Team	Apps	(Gls)
1969–1984	Thể Công		

International career
1971–1975	North Vietnam		
- * Club domestic league appearances and goals

Trần Văn Khánh (born 21 October 1949) is a Vietnamese former football manager and player.

== Career ==
Văn Khánh played as a goalkeeper and spent his entire career with Thể Công. He was the starting goalkeeper for the Vietnam national team during 14 years and was regarded as one of the best Vietnamese goalkeepers of his generation during the twentieth century. His nephews Trần Tiến Anh and Trần Anh Đức were also professional footballers.
