= Kittisak Siriwan =

Thai footballer (born 1983)

Personal information
- Full name: Kittisak Siriwan
- Date of birth: 18 July 1983 (age 43)
- Place of birth: Roi Et, Thailand
- Height: 1.66 m (5 ft 5 1/2 in)
- Position: Midfielder

Youth career
- 2000–2002: Watsuthiwaram School

Senior career*
Years	Team	Apps	(Gls)
2004–2014	Bangkok United	232	(21)
2015	Air Force Central	19	(1)
2015	TOT	8	(0)
2016–2017	BU Deffo	19	(0)
Total		278	(22)

International career
2002	Thailand U-19	6	(0)
2003	Thailand U-23	1	(0)
2004	Thailand	2	(0)
- * Club domestic league appearances and goals as of 28 June 2008

Kittisak Siriwan (born 18 July 1983) is a Thai retired footballer who played as a midfielder.

== Honours ==
- 2006 Thai Premier League championship with Bangkok University

== International career ==
Kittsak has been play for Thailand in 2004 with 2 matches.
