= Nguyễn Hải Anh =

Vietnamese footballer

Personal information
- Full name: Nguyễn Hải Anh
- Date of birth: September 15, 1987 (age 39)
- Place of birth: Nghĩa Đàn, Nghệ An, Vietnam
- Height: 1.78 m (5 ft 10 in)
- Position: Striker

Youth career
- 1999–2006: Quân Khu 7

Senior career*
Years	Team	Apps	(Gls)
2007	Quân khu 7	3	(0)
2008	Bình Thuận	5	(0)
2009–2013	Đồng Tháp	39	(20)
2010–2011	→ Kiên Giang (loan)	18	(6)
2014–2015	Đồng Nai	50	(26)
2016–2017	XSKT Cần Thơ	28	(2)
2018–2019	Hồ Chí Minh City	15	(5)
2019–2021	Bà Rịa - Vũng Tàu	42	(12)

International career^{‡}
2013–2015	Vietnam	8	(4)
- * Club domestic league appearances and goals as of 20 September 2018 ‡ National team caps and goals as of 24 May 2015

Nguyễn Hải Anh (born 15 September 1987) is a Vietnamese footballer who plays as a striker for and captains Bà Rịa–Vũng Tàu.

== International career ==
In 2013, he made a debut match against UAE in the 2015 AFC Asian Cup qualification. In 2014, in friendly matches against Myanmar and Hong Kong, he scored four goals, two goals per game.

He was called up to the national team attending the 2014 AFF Championship.

=== International goals ===
#	Date	Venue	Opponent	Score	Result	Competition
1.	2 July 2014	Gò Đậu Stadium, Thủ Dầu Một, Vietnam	Myanmar	1–0	6–0	Friendly
2.	2 July 2014	Gò Đậu Stadium, Thủ Dầu Một, Vietnam	Myanmar	2–0	6–0	Friendly
3.	6 September 2014	Lạch Tray Stadium, Hải Phòng, Vietnam	Hong Kong	1–0	3–1	Friendly
4.	6 September 2014	Lạch Tray Stadium, Hải Phòng, Vietnam	Hong Kong	2–0	3–1	Friendly
