= VTV-T&T Cup =

The VTV-T&T Cup was an invitational football tournament organised by the Vietnam Football Federation, and sponsored by the T&T Technology and Commerce Ltd. in a US$126,000 deal.. Apart from host nation Vietnam, under 23 teams from Australia, Iran and Uzbekistan were also invited to compete in the tournament. The tournament commenced on 16 April 2006 to 20 April 2006.

The tournament winner received US$40,000 in prize money, while the second and third place teams were awarded US$20,000 and $10,000 respectively.

== Champion ==
- Iran U23

== Results ==
Team	Pld	W	D	L	GF	GA	GD	Pts
1. Iran U23	3	1	2	0	3	1	+2	5
2. Australia U23	3	1	2	0	1	0	+1	5
3. Vietnam	3	0	3	0	3	3	0	3
4. Uzbekistan U23	3	0	1	2	2	5	-3	1

16 April 2006
Australia U23	0 – 0	Iran U23	16:45	Mỹ Đình National Stadium	Details
Uzbekistan U23	2 – 2	Vietnam	18:00	Mỹ Đình National Stadium	Details
18 April 2006
Australia U23	0 – 0	Vietnam	16:45	Mỹ Đình National Stadium	Details
Uzbekistan U23	0 – 2	Iran U23	18:00	Mỹ Đình National Stadium	Details
20 April 2006
Australia U23	1 – 0	Uzbekistan U23	16:45	Mỹ Đình National Stadium	Details
Vietnam	1 – 1	Iran U23	18:00	Mỹ Đình National Stadium	Details
