= Middlesex Wanderers A.F.C. =

Association football club in England

- Full name: Middlesex Wanderers Association Football Club
- Founded: 1905
- Ground: None

Middlesex Wanderers A.F.C. is an English touring amateur football team.

== History ==
When the Richmond Old Boys team (from the British School in Richmond, Surrey, failed financially after undertaking a tour of France, two members, brothers Bob and Horace Alaway, formed a successor club, Richmond Town Wanderers, in 1905 with the initial intention of a farewell tour. However, the club flourished, pursuing its mission of spreading football to countries where it was less developed than in England.

By 1912, it had affiliated to the Middlesex County Football Association, adopted the name Middlesex Wanderers, and had begun to restrict membership of its touring teams to players with county representative honours or better. The club's constitution set out its remit as:

To promote a good fellowship among football clubs and other sporting organisations throughout the world.
To send teams of British footballers on tours abroad.
To play occasional football games in the British Isles and such other games as the Executive Committee may approve.

== Colours ==
The club colours were royal blue and white.

== Early tours ==
=== 1912 tour ===
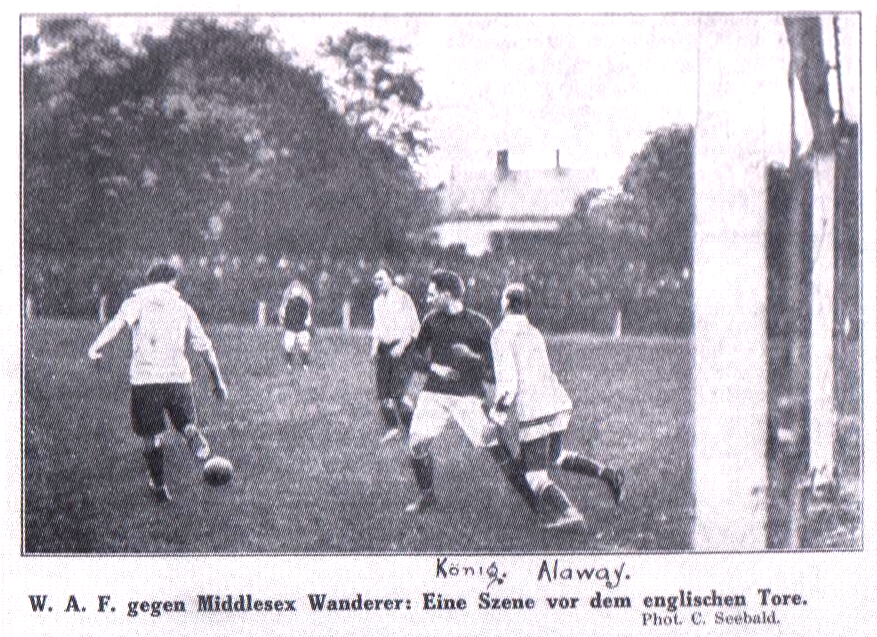
Middlesex Wanderers goalmouth under siege from WAF Wien, photo by Carl Seebald. Engelbert König (senior) is wearing the dark coloured shirt, and scored a goal

The team included Alaway (goalkeeper), Palmer, Fisher, Alley, Gibson, Mitchell, Humphreys, Jeacocke, Guscott, Bowman and Cookson.

Date	Location	Opponent	Score	Result
April 1912	Paris	Paris Université Club	?	Win
April 1912	Abbeville	Sporting Veloce Abbeville	0-5	Win
April 1912	Boulogne	US Boulogne	2-4	Win
May 1912	Vienna	Wiener AF	5-0	Loss
May 1912	Budapest	MTK Budapest FC	1-0	Loss
?	Munich	FC Bayern Munich	?	Draw

=== 1939 tour ===
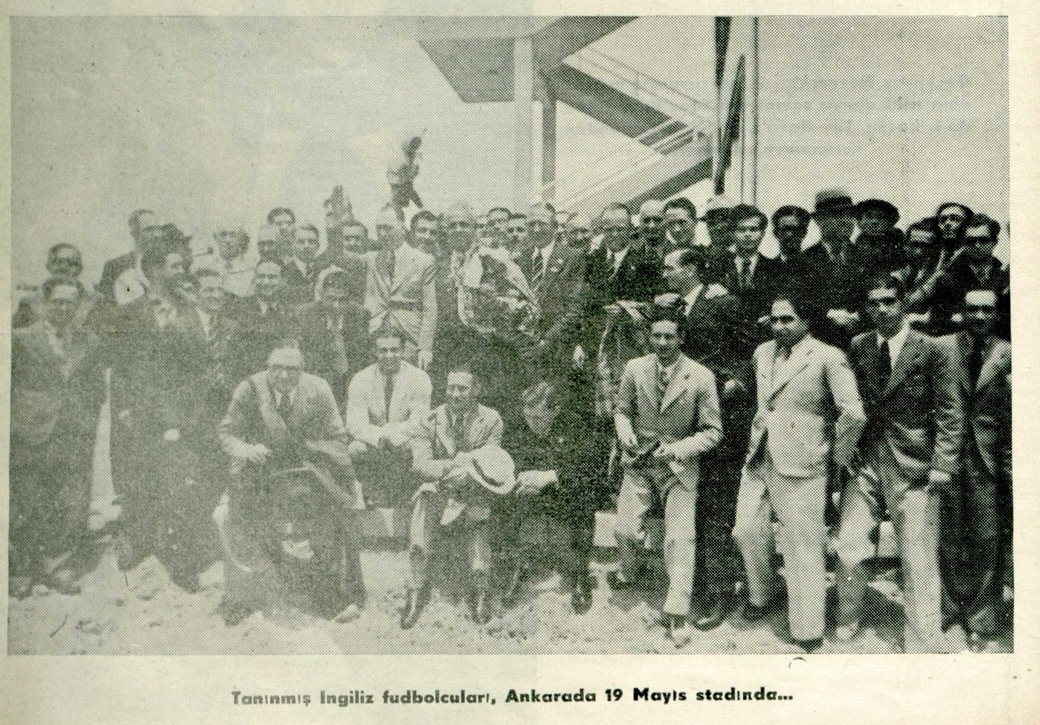
Middlesex Wanderers with Turkish team Ankara Demirspor in 1939

Wanderers' 50th tour, to Turkey in 1939, made them the first British club to visit that country; the team included international players from Wales and Ireland as well as England. They played a match with Fenerbahçe as part of that club's jubilee celebrations. Although the intention had been to remain in Istanbul, they responded to popular demand and also visited the capital, Ankara. On their return, Horace Alaway wrote to the Times commending the positive attitude of the Turkish people towards Britain, suggesting that efforts be made to strengthen business and industrial links, and pointing out that "Turkey has shrewd and intelligent leaders, but they need help and friendship, and they are looking to Britain more than to any other country".

The club co-operated with the Football Association (the FA) in undertaking a tour to the West Indies with a team comprising probables and possibles for selection for the 1960 Olympics in Rome. Norman Creek, who was to manage the British team, was liaison officer on the tour so was able to assess his potential players, who in turn were able to accustom themselves to the hotter temperatures and harder, drier pitches that they could expect in Italy. Later that year, Middlesex Wanderers were put forward by the FA to accept an invitation from the Nigerian government to play matches as part of the country's independence celebrations.

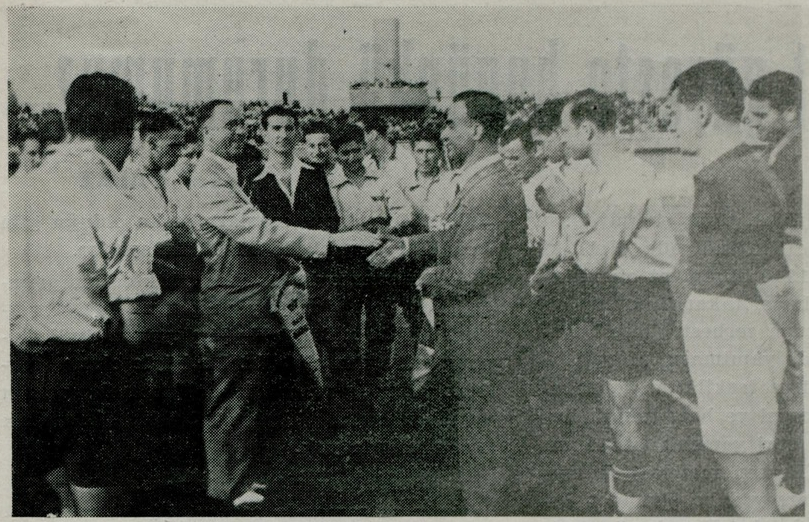
Middlesex Wanderers with Turkish team Ankara Demirspor in 1939

In 1967, Wanderers embarked on a tour of the Far East, beginning in Japan, paving the way for other European teams, including Arsenal who visited the following year. In the opening match, before which the party were presented to the brother of the Emperor, Wanderers beat the national team in front of 46,000 spectators, a record for a football match in Japan, and lost one and won one of the remaining two matches. A trophy presented by the club on their return visit in 1969, intended to encourage youth football, is still used for the National High School Soccer Tournament, and they have revisited the country several times since. In 2003, at a ceremony held at the Japanese Embassy in London, the club was presented with the Ambassador's Commendation in recognition of "its contribution to the promotion of football in Japan and to the cause of friendship between Japan and the United Kingdom." Shunichiro Okano, president of the Japan FA leading up to the 2002 FIFA World Cup held in Japan and South Korea, who was present at the ceremony, said that of all the football visitors to his country, "the most lasting impression has been that made by Middlesex Wanderers, on and off the field, with their friendly attitude and sportsmanship." They also played twice in South Korea in 1967, one victory and one defeat against the national team, and returned more than once, including for the 1977 President's Cup.
