= Nguyễn Tuấn Thành =

Vietnamese footballer

Nguyễn Tuấn Thành (born 26 September 1975) is a Vietnamese former footballer.

== Career ==
Tuấn Thành started his career in 1993, playing for Công An Hà Nội until 2003.

He played for the Vietnam national team in the 1998 AFF Championship.

== Style of play ==
He mainly operated as a striker and has been described as "technical qualities, dexterity, sophistication, and goal-scoring ability of the striker with a modest physique".

== Personal life ==
After retiring from professional football, he worked as a traffic policeman.
