= Timorense Liga Pre =

- Founded: 2005; 21 years ago
- Folded: 2010
- Country: Timor Leste
- Confederation: AFC
- Number of clubs: 9
- Level on pyramid: 2
- Promotion to: Super Liga Timorense

Timorense Liga Pre was the second division of the Federaçao Futebol Timor-Leste. This competition was a qualification for Super Liga Timorense, the first division. The competition was replaced by the Liga Futebol Amadora Segunda Divisão.

== Format ==
The competition teams were divided into 2 groups consisting of 4-5 each.
