= FC Café =

- Full name: Futebol Clube Centro Associativo de Futbol da Ermera
- Nickname(s): The Ermena Mouse
- Founded: 1962; 63 years ago
- Manager: Joan Araújo
- League: (?)
- 2017: 5th in Group A, Segunda Divisão
Home colours	Away colours

FC Café is a football team from Ermera, East Timor. They play in the Liga Futebol Amadora Segunda Divisão. CAFE stood for Centro Associativo de Futbol da Ermera.

== Competition records ==
=== Liga Futebol Amadora ===
- 2016 Segunda Divisao: 4th place in Group B

=== Taça 12 de Novembro ===
- 2016: 1st Round
