= FC Rusa Fuik =

- Full name: Football Club Rusa Fuik
- Nickname: The Fuik Deer
- Ground: Municipal Stadium
- Capacity: 5,000
- League: Super Liga Timorense

FC Rusa Fuik are a football team come from Dili. That play in the Super Liga Timorense.

== Affiliated Clubs ==
- (Indonesia) Persisum Sumbawa
- (Malaysia) Kelantan FA
