= Vũ Duy Hoàng =

Vietnamese footballer (born 1981)

Personal information
- Date of birth: 7 September 1981 (age 45)
- Height: 1.74 m (5 ft 9 in)
- Position: Defender

Senior career*
Years	Team	Apps	(Gls)
2000–2005	Nam Ðinh		
2006–2010	Hoàng Anh Gia Lai		

International career
- Vietnam U23
2003–2004	Vietnam	3	(0)
- * Club domestic league appearances and goals

Vũ Duy Hoàng (born 1981) is a Vietnamese former footballer who played as a defender.

== Career ==
Duy Hoàng grew up in Nam Định, Vietnam.

He was called up to the senior team of Nam Ðinh FC at the age of 19, and later transferred to Hoàng Anh Gia Lai in 2005. He earned a callup for Vietnam U23 to the 2003 South East Asian Games, where he helped win gold. In 2003 and 2004 he was capped three times for the Vietnam national team. After a conflict with manager Edson Tavares, he was eliminated from the national team.

He mainly operated as a defender and was described as "although he does not inherit an ideal body shape for a defender, his enthusiasm and good judgment help Duy Hoang improve continuously and quickly be recognized".

== Personal life ==
Dũng has been nicknamed "Hoàng Lục".
