= AD Vos Esperança =

Football club in Timor-Leste

- Full name: Associação Desportiva Vos Esperança
- Nickname: The Dili Elephant
- Ground: Municipal Stadium
- Capacity: 5,000
- League: Super Liga Timorense

AD Vos Esperança or Associação Desportiva Vos Esperança are a football team from Dili playing in the Super Liga Timorense.
