= Super Liga Timorense =

- Founded: 2004; 22 years ago
- Folded: 2010
- Country: Timor Leste
- Confederation: AFC
- Number of clubs: 12
- Level on pyramid: 1
- Relegation to: Liga Pre
- Broadcaster(s): TVTL

Super Liga was the top division of the Federaçao Futebol Timor-Leste. It was replaced by Liga Futebol Amadora in 2015.

== List of champions ==
- 2005–06: Fima Sporting
- 2007–10 : Not played
