= Singapore national football team results =

This article details the international fixtures and results of the Singapore men's national football team.
