= Singapore national football team =

Singapore
- Nickname: The Lions
- Association: Football Association of Singapore (FAS)
- Confederation: AFC (Asia)
- Sub-confederation: AFF (Southeast Asia)
- Head coach: Gavin Lee
- Captain: Hariss Harun
- Most caps: Hariss Harun (155)
- Top scorer: Fandi Ahmad (55)
- Home stadium: National Stadium; Jalan Besar Stadium
- FIFA code: SGP
First colours	Second colours

FIFA ranking
- Current: 149 ▼1 (7 October 2026)
- Highest: 73 (August 1993)
- Lowest: 173 (October 2017)

First international
- Singapore 1–0 China (Singapore; 22 May 1948)

Biggest win
- Singapore 11–0 Laos (Kallang, Singapore; 15 January 2007)

Biggest defeat
- Singapore 0–9 Burma (Kuala Lumpur, Malaysia; 6 November 1969)

Asian Cup
- Appearances: 2 (first in 1984)
- Best result: Group stage (1984)

ASEAN Championship
- Appearances: 14 (first in 1996)
- Best result: Champions (1998, 2004, 2007, 2012)

ASEAN Cup
- Appearances: 1 (first in 2026)
- Best result: Group stage (2026)

The Singapore national football team, (Note: Malay: Pasukan bola sepak kebangsaan Singapura, Chinese: 新加坡国家足球队, Tamil: சிங்கப்பூர் தேசிய கால்பந்து அணி) nicknamed The Lions, represents Singapore in the senior men's international football. It is organised by the Football Association of Singapore (FAS), the governing body of football in Singapore, which is affiliated with the Asian Football Confederation (AFC) and the regional ASEAN Football Federation (AFF). The team's colours are red and white. Singapore has one of the oldest national teams in Asia, with the FAS being the oldest football association in the continent itself.

Despite the country having a small population pool, it has historically punched above its weight by successively producing squads that have fiercely competed with other squads from its larger and much more populated neighbours. This can be seen in its most significant successes, which have come in the regional AFF Championship, where Singapore has won four times in 1998, 2004, 2007, and 2012. Singapore was the first team to achieve this feat and the only team to win in all the finals that they had played. In 1998, Singapore defeated Vietnam in the final to obtain its first major international football title. In the 2004–05 competition, Singapore defeated Indonesia in a two-leg final 5–2 on aggregate. Singapore retained the trophy in 2007, beating Thailand 3–2 on aggregate in the final. In 2012, Singapore won the trophy a record 4th time, again defeating three-time champions Thailand 3–2 on aggregate in the final.

Singapore has also achieved notable results beyond its sub-confederation. In the 2007 AFC Asian Cup qualification, Singapore became the only team to beat Iraq where Iraq was en route to their AFC Asian Cup-winning campaign. Singapore also drew with China 0–0, 1–1, and 2–2 at home in 2006, 2009 and 2024 respectively. In March 2008, Australia also failed to beat Singapore when the game ended in a goalless draw. During the 2018 FIFA World Cup qualifiers, Japan was held to a draw at home at the Saitama Stadium by Singapore, being the only game where they had dropped points in the group. Singapore also notably managed to get good results against UEFA continent against Kazakhstan on 24 December 2006 which resulted in a 0–0 draw and Azerbaijan which ended in a 2–2 draw on 24 February 2012. In 2025, Singapore secured qualification for the 2027 AFC Asian Cup by finishing first in their third round group. The team went unbeaten throughout the stage and won all of their away matches.

== History ==
=== Early history (1892–1994) ===
In 1892, the Singapore Amateur Football Association applied to become a registered society. The HMS Malaya Cup (which was later known as the Malaysia Cup) was launched in 1921 by officers of a British battleship in Malaya, and Singapore was one of the six teams that took part in the inaugural year, and won the event. While the representative side in the Malaysia Cup and the Malaysian League was not the national team per se – this team included some foreign players as it is more of a club side – many Singapore football fans viewed the Singapore Lions club side as being almost synonymous to the national team as well. They either won or were runners up in the event every year until 1941, after which it was suspended because of World War II.

Overall, Singapore won 24 Malaysia Cup titles and two Malaysian League titles. After winning the Malaysia Cup and league double in 1994, the Football Association of Singapore withdrew from the Malaysian competitions following a dispute with the Football Association of Malaysia over gate receipts. Singapore subsequently launched its own professional league, the S.League, in 1996, and also began to put much more focus on the performance of its national team in international competitions.

At that time, Singapore hosted their first and so far, its only international competition, the 1984 AFC Asian Cup. The team was eliminated from the group stage with four points, a 2–0 win over India and a 1–1 draw to giant Iran. In the FIFA World Rankings, Singapore's highest standing was in the first release of the figures, in August 1993, at 73rd.

=== First regional title (1995–2003) ===
Singapore won the bronze medal in the 1995 Southeast Asian Games, after losing 0–1 in the semi-finals to the hosts and eventual gold medalists, Thailand. Singapore hosted the inaugural AFF Championship (then known as Tiger Cup) in 1996 but were eliminated in the group stages.

The national team again reached the semi-finals of the Southeast Asian Games in 1997, losing to Indonesia, and lost to Vietnam 0–1 in the third-place match.

However, in the 1998 edition of the AFF Championship, Singapore's team led by coach Barry Whitbread won the group stage with victories over Malaysia and the Philippines. In the semi-finals, they beat Indonesia and subsequently edged out hosts Vietnam 1–0 in the final. This was the country's first ever international title.

Jan B. Poulsen, who was part of Denmark's backroom staff at the 1998 FIFA World Cup, was appointed the Technical Director of the Football Association of Singapore in 1999. Due to poor results by Singapore in the 2000 AFF Championship, coach Vincent Subramaniam was sacked and Poulsen took over as coach in December 2000. Singapore hosted the 2002 AFF Championship, but lost 0–4 to arch-rivals Malaysia in their first game. Before the game, local newspaper The New Paper was encouraging fans to turn up in numbers. After the game, the Lions attributed their heavy defeat to the unexpected large crowd. Singapore went on to win 2–1 over Laos, but a 1–1 draw in the final group game against Thailand was not enough for them to reach the knock-out stages. Poulsen was sacked after the tournament.

=== AFF Championship triumph (2004–2012) ===
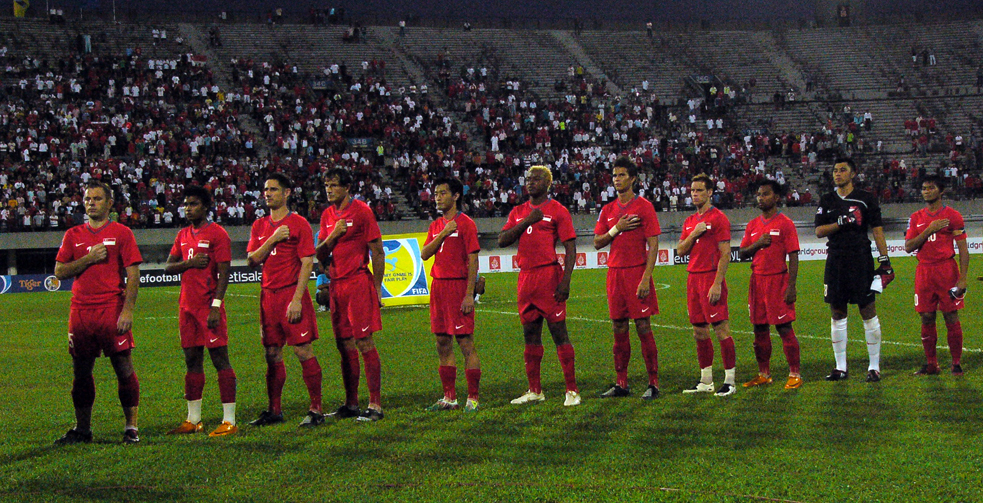
Singapore 2–0 Lebanon on 26 March 2008 at the Old Kallang National Stadium.

Radojko Avramović took over as coach of the flailing and deflated Singapore national football team in July 2003. Singapore started the 2004 AFF Championship as underdogs but a 1–1 draw in their first game against hosts Vietnam, another draw against Indonesia, and wins against Cambodia and Laos saw them qualify for the semi-finals.

Singapore were drawn against Myanmar in the two-legged semi-finals. Singapore took a 4–3 away lead back home for the second leg. In the ill-tempered second leg, three Myanmar players were sent off and a reserve Myanmar goalkeeper even threw a water bottle at defender S. Subramani. Singapore went on to win 4–2 after extra time for an 8–5 aggregate victory.

Singapore then won the first leg of the two-legged final against Indonesia 3–1 in Jakarta, before winning 2–1 (5–2 on aggregate) in the second leg in front of a strong 55,000 home crowd at the former National Stadium.

In 2006, Avramović then led Singapore into the 2007 AFC Asian Cup qualifiers with a 2–0 victory at home over Iraq, but Singapore failed to build on this victory and then lost away to Palestine. The Singapore team then took on China away in Tianjin and lost to an injury time penalty. China travelled to Singapore for the second meeting and the Singapore defence held out for a 0–0 draw. A subsequent 2–4 loss to Iraq dashed Singapore's hopes of qualifying for the AFC Asian Cup. The AFC Asian Cup qualifying campaign ended with a default 3–0 victory over Palestine, who were unable to fulfil the fixture.

Singapore hosted the group stages of the 2007 AFF Championship. After a 0–0 draw with Vietnam, Singapore then thrashed Laos 11–0 to record their largest-ever win. In the final group match, Singapore knocked Indonesia out of the tournament in a 2–2 draw. Singapore met Malaysia in the semi-final. The first leg saw a 1–1 draw in Shah Alam, while in the second leg at Singapore's National Stadium, following another 1–1 draw, Singapore beat Malaysia in a penalty shoot-out 5–4, goalkeeper Lionel Lewis saving the final Malaysian spot kick from Mohd Khyril Muhymeen Zambri. In the final against Thailand, Singapore won a controversial first leg at home 2–1, then secured a 1–1 draw in Bangkok thanks to a late strike from Khairul Amri to retain the AFF Championship trophy. In the 2008 AFF Championship co-hosted by Indonesia and Thailand, Singapore was drawn in Group A to against Indonesia, Myanmar and Cambodia. Singapore progressed from the group as winners. However, they lost out to eventual winners Vietnam 0–1 on aggregate.

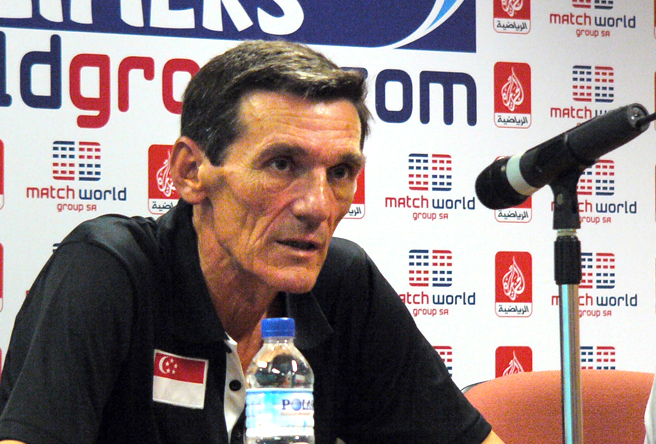
Radojko Avramović, nicknamed 'Raddy' by Singaporeans, is Singapore's most decorated and longest serving coach from 2003 to 2012, winning the AFF Championship three times.

Singapore met Palestine in the first round of the 2010 FIFA World Cup Asian qualification. Singapore won the first leg 4–0 away in Doha, and the Palestinians again failed to fulfil the away fixture, so FIFA awarded Singapore a 3–0 win. Singapore was drawn with Tajikistan in the second round: Singapore won the home match 2–0 and drew the return leg 1–1 on 18 November to progress to the third round of the Asian Qualifying Tournament for the first time, where they were drawn against Saudi Arabia, Lebanon and Uzbekistan. Singapore's group stage campaign began with a loss to Saudi Arabia, but the Lions then beat Lebanon 2–0 at home. Successive losses to Uzbekistan, 3–7 and 0–1, left Singapore with little chance of getting into the next round. Singapore were finally eliminated when they lost 0–2 to the Saudis at home. FIFA later awarded Saudi Arabia and Uzbekistan both a 3–0 win, where they won 2–0 and 1–0 respectively, due to Singapore fielding Qiu Li, who is not eligible to represent Singapore. Singapore finished third in the group with six points from six games after defeating Lebanon 2–1 in Beirut in their final game. With the elimination, Goal 2010For the 2011 AFC Asian Cup qualification, Singapore was drawn in Group E, together with Iran, Thailand and Jordan. Singapore were beaten 0–6 by Iran in the first match, and then defeated Jordan 2–1.

In November 2009, Singapore hosted Thailand at the National Stadium and lost 3–1, but won the return fixture 1–0 a few days later, earning Singapore their first victory on Thai soil in 48 years. Singapore next hosted Iran, losing 1–3, and the 1–2 defeat against Jordan which followed ended their hopes of AFC Asian Cup football in 2011. The players reported some teammates were smoking during half-time in the match against Jordan. In 2010, Singapore drew with the Philippines 1–1, defeated Myanmar 2–1, then duly lost to Vietnam 0–1 in the knockout stage decider. As a result, Singapore was knocked out of the group stage in Hanoi. The Lions were criticised for their dismal performances in the AFF Championship, which they won in 1998, 2004, and 2007. In January 2011, the FAS decided to disband and revamp the national team. Six months later, The Lions were back in action after the dismal performances in 2010.

In May 2011, national team coach Avramović announced the new 33-strong national provisional squad for the upcoming international friendlies and 2014 FIFA World Cup qualification campaign. The Lions were scheduled to play international friendlies against Maldives on 7 June 2011 and Laos on 18 July 2011. Few days after releasing the provisional 33-man squad, national team training started in preparation of the match against Maldives. Avramović led the new-look Lions in a game where Singapore won Maldives 4–0 at the Jalan Besar Stadium, Singapore in a friendly match. (Note. The match was not an 'A' international because unlimited substitutions were allowed.) After the 4–0 win against Maldives, less than a week later before the 2014 FIFA World Cup qualifiers, a final friendly was played against Chinese Taipei. Singapore won the match 3–2 with goals from Aleksandar Đurić, Shi Jiayi and Fazrul Nawaz. In preparation for the third round of the FIFA World Cup qualifiers, the Lions played a friendly non-'A' match against Thailand before their opening qualifier against China. The friendly finished 0–0.

Singapore received a bye to the second round of 2014 FIFA World Cup qualification in 2011 because of their accession to the third round of the qualifying in the previous World Cup. Their second round opponents were regional rivals Malaysia, whom they beat 5–3 in the first leg with goals from Aleksandar Đurić, Qiu Li, Mustafic Fahrudin and Shi Jiayi. The second leg was held at the National Stadium, Bukit Jalil on 28 July 2011. A 1–1 draw thanks to a key Shi Jiayi goal in the second half was enough to put Singapore through to the third round of 2014 FIFA World Cup qualifiers. In the preliminary draw in Brazil on 30 July 2011 by the football governing body FIFA, Singapore was drawn into Group A for their Round 3 of the Asian qualifiers with Jordan, Iraq and China. Singapore kicked off the third round with a 1–2 loss to China in Kunming. They then succumbed to a second defeat, 0–2, against Iraq. The next match was slated to be held at Jalan Besar Stadium on 11 October against Jordan which Singapore lost 0–3. A 0–2 defeat to Jordan in Amman killed off the Lions' chances of progress. Singapore ended the year with a 0–4 defeat at home to China PR, their 5th consecutive loss. Iraq then dealt the Singapore team a heavy 1–7 lost in Doha with Singapore bowing out with no wins. Singapore then played a friendly match against UEFA nation Azerbaijan which resulted in a 2–2 draw where Singapore was down with two goals before Shahril Ishak breaks the deadlock in the 70th minute. Shahdan Sulaiman would then score an equaliser at the last kick of the game in the 90+3rd minute stoppage time.

In the 2012 AFF Championship, Singapore started their tournament with a 3–0 win over close rivals Malaysia. They then lost 0–1 to Indonesia before winning 4–3 in the knockout stage decider against Laos. to top the group and qualify for the semi-finals which sees them face against the Philippines in the semi-finals, Singapore won 1–0 on aggregate with a solitary goal from Khairul Amri during the home leg of the semi-finals was enough to set up a meeting with Thailand in the finals. The Lions won the first leg of the finals 3–1 in Singapore. Despite losing the away leg 0–1, Singapore was able to pick up the 2012 AFF Championship, their fourth championship. Singapore holds the record for the highest number of AFF Championship titles at that point of time. Radojko Avramović ended his tenure as Singapore coach after the tournament.

=== Falling performances and drought (2013–2018) ===
FAS then hired the former Singapore footballer, V. Sundramoorthy as head coach in 2013 ahead of the 2015 AFC Asian Cup qualification, Singapore was drawn in Group A, together with Jordan, Syria and Oman. Singapore were beaten 0–4 by Jordan in the first match, and then loss to Jordan with a scoreline of 0–2. In October 2013, Singapore hosted Syria at the Jalan Besar Stadium and with their first win of the campaign with a 2–1 victory thanks to Gabriel Quak's late winner which was also his first international goal. But a month later, Syria beat Singapore in the return fixture 0–4. Singapore next hosted Jordan, losing 1–3, and the 1–3 defeat against Oman which followed ended their hopes of AFC Asian Cup football in 2015.

The FAS announced on 15 May 2013 that they had appointed German Bernd Stange as the new head coach of the national team. On 27 May 2013, Stange announced his choice of 23 players for the friendlies against Myanmar and Laos on 4 June 2013 and 7 June 2013 respectively. The squad featured several new players who were called up to the national squad for the first time, including 17-year-old Adam Swandi. LionsXII midfielders Gabriel Quak and Faris Ramli and Tanjong Pagar United's winger Hafiz Nor also received their first national call-ups. Veteran forward Indra Sahdan was also recalled to the national team. He took the captain's armband on 4 June 2013 for coach Stange's first game against Myanmar which Singapore won 2–0. He also scored the first goal in the second friendly match against Laos, which saw Singapore with a 5–2 victory. Following the two wins, Singapore's FIFA World Rankings rose nine places to 156 in July 2013. On 15 October 2013, Stange registered his first international competition win in a 2015 AFC Asian Cup qualification match against Syria with Gabriel Quak scoring a late goal to win the match 2–1 at the Jalan Besar Stadium. Stange had been trying to inculcate the one-touch, quick-tempo style of play for into the Singapore team, and gear the team up for the 2014 AFF Championship and try to retain the AFF Championship. Singapore entered the 2014 AFF Championship as the defending champions trying to defend the cup on home soil, but their title defence was spoiled with a 1–2 defeat over Thailand, which they also faced back in 2012. Then, they beat Myanmar 4–2 before bowing out after suffering a 1–3 defeat to rivals Malaysia. The Lions finished with 3 points and 3rd in Group B, and are the first team in the history of the AFF Championship to bow out from the group stage as the defending champions.

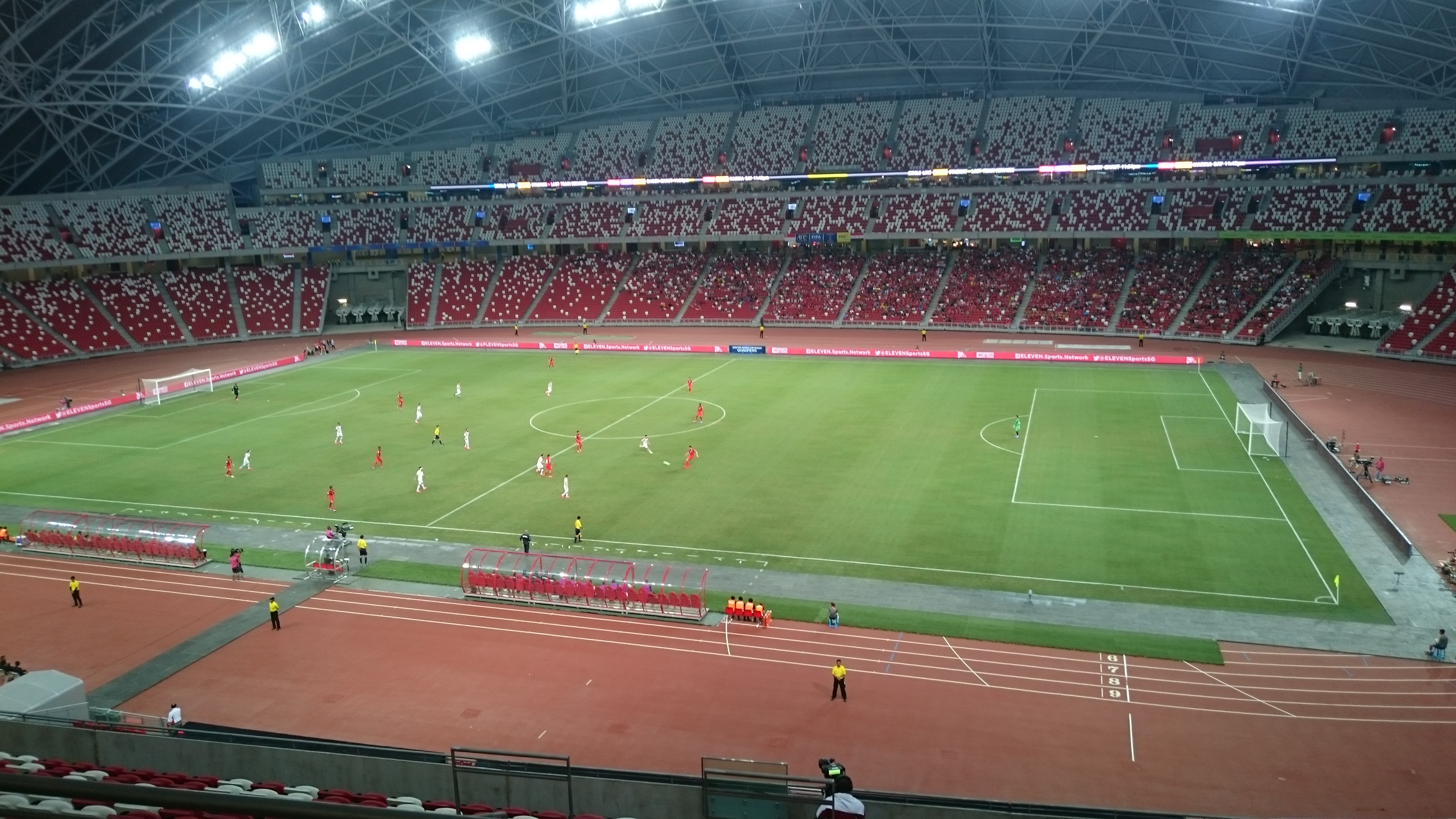
Singapore playing against Syria on 17 November 2015 during the 2018 FIFA World Cup qualification.

Singapore then started their campaign with an away game against Cambodia on 11 June 2015 which ended 4–0 in favour of Singapore. Following which, they travelled to Saitama Stadium in Japan where they held the hosts to a goalless draw. However, they were defeated by Syria 0–1, at the Sultan Qaboos Sports Complex in Muscat, Oman, marking their first loss in the group stages of the tournament. The Lions then beat Afghanistan by a scoreline of 1–0 and their 2nd consecutive win against Cambodia, winning the game 2–1. However, the winning streak ended when they faced Japan at home, and were defeated 0–3. They then went on to face Syria, which was a tight game. Khribin of Syria scored on the 20th minute and were 0–1 up. Safuwan of Singapore scored a late equaliser on the 89th minute but Singapore could not hold on to the draw which ended Khribin again scoring on the 3rd minute of added time after the 90th minute, this resulted in a 1–2 loss to Singapore. Singapore played their final game against Afghanistan and were defeated 1–2. Singapore finished in third place in the table with 10 total points.

In April 2016, a month after the match against Afghanistan, the FAS announced that Bernd Stange contract would not be renewed and he left the Singapore national football team. After a few months of Stange's departure, FAS announced the new caretaker coach was to be then Tampines Rovers head coach V. Sundramoorthy. Sundram's first major tournament was the 2016 AYA Bank Cup in June where the team won host Myanmar and went on to the finals against Vietnam. In that match, the two teams drew after 90 mins and went on to extra time where Singapore conceded 3 goals to clinch second. After a few months, Sundram and FAS arranged the long-awaited Causeway Challenge against Singapore's rival, Malaysia. In that match, Singapore created a lot of chances and dominated the game but was unfortunate to end the game with a 0–0 draw.

In 2016, Sundram also called up a few uncapped players like Syazwan Buhari, Khairulhin Khalid, Irfan Fandi, Abdil Qaiyyim, Shawal Anuar, Azhar Sairudin and Amy Recha. Many of which has at least one cap to their name. Although Hami Syahin was not called up for any matches, he was registered in the 40-man provisional squad for the 2016 AFF Championship. Sundram also recalled several players like Daniel Bennett, Mustafic Fahrudin, Zulfadli Zainal and Hafiz Nor. Ridhuan Muhammad was not recalled for any matches but was registered in the 40-man provisional squad for the 2016 AFF Championship. Sundram also gave chances to the two players, Shahfiq Ghani and Shahdan Sulaiman who both just recovered from long-term injuries to prove themselves. For the 2016 AFF Championship, Singapore was grouped with ASEAN giants, Thailand together with Indonesia and Philippines and was grouped in the "Group of Death" as the teams in this group were tough. Singapore then started their tournament with a 0–0 draw over Philippines. They then lost 0–1 to Thailand where Thailand's Sarawut Masuk scored a late winner in the 89th minute. Singapore actually needed at least a draw with Indonesia and Thailand have to beat Philippines to qualify for the semi-finals. It was great news in the first half as Singapore was leading 1–0 but Singapore's defence went to sleep and conceded 2 late goals for Indonesia to qualify for the semi-finals. Singapore ended their 2016 AFF Championship at the bottom of the table.

Singapore started their 2019 AFC Asian Cup qualification third round campaign against Bahrain on 28 March 2017. Singapore drew with Bahrain with a score-line of 0–0. In Singapore's next game, they went on to play against Chinese Taipei where they lost 1–2 at home with Singapore's vice-captain Hariss Harun scoring and Xavier Chen and Chen Chao-an scoring for the visitors. Singapore's head coach V. Sundramoorthy introduced a National Team Day where Mondays are for players who are called up for a short meeting and tactical training session in the pitch. In this call up, Sundram recalled players like Raihan Rahman. Sundram also called up the uncapped Ho Wai Loon tas a standby player for matches against Afghanistan and Bahrain. Sundram also called up uncapped Muhaimin Suhaimi for the friendly against Myanmar, the 2019 AFC Asian Cup Qualifiers against Chinese Taipei and the friendly against Argentina. They made history for not winning any match in a year, reaching the lowest FIFA ranking ever of 173rd placing. Singapore finished bottom of the group with 2 points, losing the final match 1–0 to secure home-and-away losses against Chinese Taipei on 26 March 2018.

=== Rebuilding (2019–2021) ===
On 7 March, 2019, Nazri Nasir was appointed as interim head coach of the Singapore national team for the 2019 Airmarine Cup friendly tournament on 20 and 23 March. With the team, he won the semi-final match against Malaysia 1–0 before losing in the final to Oman 4–5 on penalties, having tied 1–1 in normal time.

On 30 May 2019, former Jurong Town player, Tatsuma Yoshida, was unveiled as the head coach of the national team. Yoshida's first game in charge for the national team ended in a 4–3 victory against the Solomon Islands at the National Stadium. Singapore started off their 2022 FIFA World Cup qualification campaign at the Jalan Besar Stadium drawing 2–2 to Yemen and winning Palestine 2–1 on 5 September and 10 September respectively. The national team than travelled to Riyadh to face Saudi Arabia at the King Saud University Stadium. Singapore managed to grip on to their defence and prevented Saudi Arabia from scoring until Salem Al-Dawsari breaks the deadlock in the 83rd minute. Saudi Arabia then scored two more goals with Fahad Al-Muwallad and Saleh Al-Shehri. The Lions finished in fourth place just above Yemen, failing to qualify for the 2022 FIFA World Cup but qualified for the 2023 AFC Asian Cup qualifying third round.

Yoshida then extended his contract in early 2021 to focus on the 2020 AFF Championship which the tournament was postponed and rescheduled due to the COVID-19 pandemic. Singapore was then chosen to host the tournament in a centralized venue. Singapore started off their group stage campaign with a winning streak by beating Myanmar 3–0, Philippines 1–2 and Timor-Leste 2–0 before losing to eventual cup winners, Thailand 2–0 in the last group stage fixtures. With three wins, Singapore qualified for the semi-finals as runners-up which see them face Indonesia.

On 21 December in the first leg, Singapore and Indonesia contested in a 1–1 draw. On the reverse fixture on 25 December, the match was tied at 2–2 which see the match going into extra time. Safuwan Baharudin after collecting two yellow cards and Irfan Fandi who was deemed denying a goalscoring opportunity, were both sent off in normal time and Singapore played with nine players in extra time. Indonesia went on to score two more goals in the first half of extra time. In the second half, goalkeeper Hassan Sunny as sent off for a last man challenge on Irfan Jaya. As Singapore had used all its substitution, Ikhsan Fandi took over as goalkeeper for the remainder of the match. The matched ended for a 4–2 win (5–3 on aggregate) for Indonesia.

On 28 December 2023, Yoshida ended his stint as a head coach by mutual agreement citing family reasons.

=== Stagnation period (2022–2024) ===
Nazri Nasri was appointed as the interim coach and oversaw Singapore's participation in the 2022 FAS Tri-Nations Series consisting of Malaysia and Philippines at the National Stadium. In his first game on 26 March 2022, Ikhsan Fandi scored two goals which saw Singapore winning against, Malaysia 2–1 and three days later, a 2–0 victory against the Philippines.

On 25 April 2022, FAS announced the appointment of Takayuki Nishigaya as the new head coach of Singapore. Nishigaya took charge of his first game playing in a friendly match against Kuwait in a 2–0 loss at the Al Nahyan Stadium in Abu Dhabi. Singapore started off their 2023 AFC Asian Cup qualifying third round playing in Bishkek, Kyrgyzstan losing to Kyrgyzstan 2–1 after Song Ui-young scored the first goal for Singapore but gave away a penalty minutes later. Singapore then went on to narrowly lose to Tajikistan 0–1 and despite winning their last group fixture against Myanmar 6–2, they were eliminated from Asian Cup qualification.

In October 2023, Singapore started off their 2026 FIFA World Cup qualification in the first round against Guam on 13 October. The first leg took place at the National Stadium, which saw a total number of 10,355 spectators in attendance as Singapore gained the upper hand with a 2–1 victory with goals from Christopher van Huizen and Jacob Mahler. However, the fans weren't too satisfied with the performances as Singapore missed a lot of scoring opportunities sorely, lacking the composure in front of goal with the advantages of playing at home. The team then travelled to Dededo facing Guam in the second leg on 17 October at the GFA National Training Center where Shawal Anuar scored the only goal in the match securing the win. Singapore then advance to the second round being grouped with Asian powerhouse South Korea, China and Southeast Asia rivals, Thailand.

During the 2026 FIFA World Cup qualification match on 21 March 2024, Singapore under new head coach Tsutomu Ogura, played at home to China, where they trailed 2–0 with Wu Lei scoring both goals, before Faris Ramli and Jacob Mahler secured the comeback to upset the visitors and hold them to a 2–2 draw. In the away fixture in Tianjin, immediately after conceding a goal to China, Hariss Harun punted a long ball to Ryhan Stewart, who then crossed the ball into the opponent box, providing it to Faris Ramli, who scored the header, equalising the match 8 seconds after kick-off. However, Singapore ultimately fell to a 4–1 defeat to China.

On 6 June 2024, Singapore was hammered 7–0 by South Korea at the National Stadium, which saw Son Heung-min and Lee Kang-in scoring a brace, with Hwang Hee-chan also scoring a goal in the match. Five days later, Singapore ended their World Cup qualification campaign with a 3–1 away loss to Thailand to end their run in bottom, but it was notable as Singapore's valiant performance, notably with goalkeeper Hassan Sunny making 13 saves and Ikhsan Fandi's equaliser, proved to have made the difference as Thailand's victory was not enough to seize the second place from China, which progressed via superior head-to-head record.

Singapore was then grouped alongside Hong Kong, India and Bangladesh in the third round of the 2027 AFC Asian Cup qualification. Singapore then played a goalless draw at home against Hong Kong on 25 March 2025. Needing a win, Singapore then played against Bangladesh in Dhaka where the Lions managed to grab a 2–1 away win.

=== Resurgence era (2025–present) ===
On 24 June 2025, Ogura stepped down as the national team head coach, due to personal reasons. His role was temporarily taken over by Gavin Lee on interim basis.

==== Return to the AFC Asian Cup ====
In October 2025, Singapore completed their remaining AFC Asian Cup qualification matches against India, drawing 1–1 at home before securing a 1–2 victory thanks to a double from Song Ui-young in the return fixture at the Jawaharlal Nehru Stadium in Goa. On 18 November, Singapore met Hong Kong needing a win to qualify for the 2027 AFC Asian Cup. After initially being a goal down, Coach Gavin Lee introduced Ilhan Fandi in the 57th minute. Ilhan subsequently set up Shawal Anuar in the 64th minute to equalise as well as scoring from outside the penalty area with his weaker foot four minutes later. The match ended in a 1–2 away victory for Singapore at the Kai Tak Sports Park in Kowloon. This marked the first time that Singapore had qualified for the AFC Asian Cup through a full qualification campaign on merit and their first appearance at the tournament since 1984.

On 28 November, the FAS announced interim coach Lee as the new head coach of the Singapore national team.

On the final fixtures of the qualification match in the group stage, Singapore faced off against Bangladesh in front of 30,105 spectators where Harhys Stewart scored the only goal in the match to secure a 1–0 win. Singapore managed to finish the qualifiers being undefeated with 4 wins and 2 draws.

==== 2026 ASEAN Championship ====
Singapore were drawn in Group A against Vietnam, Indonesia, Cambodia, and Timor-Leste in the group stage of the 2026 ASEAN Championship. They finished second with 8 points, which see them face Thailand in the semi-final. The Lions were eliminated despite beating Thailand 2–1 in the second-leg semi-final at the Rajamangala Stadium in Bangkok. This meant Singapore fell 3–4 on aggregate after a 1–3 lost in the first-leg semi-final at the Jalan Besar Stadium.

==== 2026 FIFA ASEAN Cup ====
In September 2026, Singapore played in the inaugural FIFA ASEAN Cup of the 2026 edition. Singapore were drawn alongside host Indonesia, Malaysia and Bangladesh in Group A. Singapore lost 2–0 in their opening game against Indonesia but recorded their first win in the tournament on 28 September after Harhys Stewart scored the only goal in the match against Bangladesh to secure a 1–0 win. Three days later however, they failed keep their hope alive after being tarnished by Malaysia with a 0–6 defeat.

== Team image ==
=== Kits and crest ===
Singapore historically played in blue shirts and shorts before adopting the national colours of red and white as its principal colours in the late 1980s. Blue subsequently became a customary colour for the away kit. For the 2007 AFF Championship, Singapore temporarily used blue as its primary kit colour and white as its alternate colour.

Singapore had initially worn blue shirts and shorts as their home kit. However, in the late 1980s, The Lions adopted the national colours of red and white for their home kit while they kept blue as the colour for the away kit. This tradition stayed on through the 1990s. For the 2007 AFF Championship, the national team's colours reverted to blue as its home kit and white as the other kit.

Before 2006, Singapore had been using the same kit for nearly 5 years, supplied by Tiger who had a tie-in with Diadora. The kit used during the 2007 AFF Championship made its final appearance on 4 February 2007 against Thailand. The next kit was first used on 24 June 2007 against North Korea. The jersey has white trims at the edge of the sleeves and around the neck. Unlike most national teams which use the country's footballing association as a logo on the kit, the national flag of Singapore takes up the spot on the left chest instead while a white Nike logo is on the right chest and this symmetry also applies to the away jersey. The numbering and lettering font and colour is the same as the previous two home jerseys.

In 2008, tight-fit jerseys were revealed in the two traditional team colours: red for the home games and blue for the away matches. The kit was worn for the first time by the national team in the international friendly against Australia in preparation for the 2010 FIFA World Cup qualifier home game against Lebanon on 26 March 2008.

In November 2010, Nike launched a new football kit for Singapore, specially made for the 2010 AFF Championship. The home kit's design was of half dark red and light red. The away kit features half navy blue and light blue that was once worn by Singapore football team in 1970's era. In recent years, the national team kits would often also include the FAS logo, either exclusively or along with the Singapore flag.

In 2020, Singapore revert to using FAS logo on the national jersey for the first time since 1998. However, this earned backlash from fans demanding to retain the Singaporean flag on the national jersey. The 2022 jerseys were then included the Singaporean flag sitting on top of the FAS logo but still earned the negative outlash from fans stating that the flag deserve to be bigger. The national kit were worn for the first time during the team's friendly against Maldives on 17 December 2022, which they won 3–1. This is also the team's From 1932 until the National Stadium was opened in 1973, Jalan Besar Stadium hosted all home games of Singapore's representative sides which participated in the Malaysia Cup. Since then, all of Singapore's home games in the Malaysia Cup and the national team home matches were played at the National Stadium.

Kit supplier	Period
(England) Admiral	1954–1973
(Germany) Puma	1974–1990
(England) Umbro	1991–1992
(Germany) Puma	1993–1997
(Thailand) Grand Sport	1998–2000
(Italy) Diadora (Singapore) Tiger	2001–2006
(United States) Nike	2007–2026
(Germany) Adidas	2026–present

=== Supporters ===
"SingaBrigade" is the name of the main supporters group for the national team in Singapore, which consists of die-hard Singapore football fans. They are known for their high fanaticism and support towards the national team. In every international match the national team played, they are found as a group standing at the supporters area of Section 130. The main colours for these supporter are usually in red with a scarf and banners just like the national team kits colours. These supporters always bring drums and large national flags to the stadiums. Since 2023, the numbers of home attendance rise up where it sold 29,644 tickets during the 2026 FIFA World Cup qualification (AFC) match against Thailand in November.

== Stadium ==
From 1932 until the National Stadium was opened in 1973, Jalan Besar Stadium hosted all home games of Singapore's representative sides which participated in the Malaysia Cup. Since then, all of Singapore's home games in the Malaysia Cup and the national team home matches were played at the National Stadium.

However, the National Stadium officially closed in 2007 and was slated for demolishment in 2010 to make way for the new Singapore Sports Hub which was completed in 2014. During the intervening period, the national team primarily used Jalan Besar Stadium. Singapore played Australia in what was planned to be the last game ever to be played at that stadium. However, due to some delays caused by the addition of new plans for the Singapore Sports Hub, the National Stadium continued to host five more matches, and it was also the venue for two more 2010 FIFA World Cup qualification matches.

The National Stadium is a multi-purpose venue used for sporting events, concerts, national celebrations and other large-scale events. Consequently, national-team matches have occasionally been moved to Jalan Besar because of scheduling conflicts, event preparation or pitch-conversion requirements. The allocation of events at the stadium attracted parliamentary scrutiny after Singapore's home semi-final in the 2024 ASEAN Championship was played at Jalan Besar Stadium on 26 December 2024. The tournament had originally been scheduled to conclude on 21 December, during a period for which the National Stadium had been reserved for the competition, but the ASEAN Football Federation altered the schedule in August 2024. By then, other large-scale events had been contracted for late December and early January. The Government stated that accommodating the rescheduled match was not logistically possible because of the time required for event set-up and pitch preparation.

Singapore's group-stage home matches in the 2026 ASEAN Championship were also allocated to Jalan Besar Stadium because the National Stadium was being prepared for the National Day Parade on 9 August, with rehearsals taking place during the tournament. The FAS stated that Jalan Besar Stadium met the applicable requirements for international competition, although discussions continued over the possible use of the National Stadium should Singapore reach the knockout stage. Singapore played the home semi-final at Jalan Besar Stadium on 15 August 2026.

Since the start of 2004, Singapore has played its home matches in 7 different stadiums all over Singapore.

Singapore national football team home stadiums
Image	Stadium	Capacity	Location	Last match
	National Stadium	55,000	Kallang	v Bangladesh (31 March 2026; 2027 AFC Asian Cup qualification)
	Jalan Besar Stadium	6,000	Kallang	v Thailand (15 August 2026; 2026 ASEAN Championship)
	Bishan Stadium	6,254	Bishan	v Maldives (5 June 2025; Friendly)
	Choa Chu Kang Stadium	4,268	Choa Chu Kang	v India (16 October 2012; Friendly)
	Jurong West Stadium	4,600	Jurong West	v Pakistan (19 November 2012; Friendly)
	Jurong East Stadium	2,700	Jurong East	v Brunei (6 June 2015; Friendly)
	Hougang Stadium	3,800	Hougang	v Hong Kong (9 September 2014; Friendly)
	Yishun Stadium	3,400	Yishun	v Cambodia (17 November 2014; Friendly)

== Rivalries ==
Singapore has rivalries with Thailand, Indonesia, Malaysia, and Vietnam. Their rivalries are rooted in geographical proximity.

== Results and fixtures ==
The following is a list of match results in the last 12 months, as well as any future matches that have been scheduled.

Win Draw Loss Fixture

=== 2026 ===
26 March Friendly	Faroe Islands	Cancelled	Singapore	Dubai, United Arab Emirates
17:00 UTC+4				Stadium: Rashid Stadium
Note: Match cancelled due to the 2026 Iran war

31 March 2027 AFC Asian Cup qualification	Singapore	1–0	Bangladesh	Kallang, Singapore
20:00 UTC+8	H. Stewart 31'	Report; Report (AFC)		Stadium: National Stadium; Attendance: 30,105; Referee: Ben Abraham (Australia)

31 May Friendly	Singapore	4–0	Mongolia	Kallang, Singapore
19:30 UTC+8	Safuwan 22' (pen.); Song 38'; Shawal 58'; Ikhsan 87'	Report		Stadium: Jalan Besar Stadium; Attendance: 4,324; Referee: Kim Woo-sung (South Korea)

5 June Friendly	Singapore	1–2	China	Kallang, Singapore
19:30 UTC+8	Ilhan Fandi 76'	Report	Serginho 16'; Zhang Yuning 41' (pen.)	Stadium: Jalan Besar Stadium; Attendance: 4,688; Referee: Rustam Lutfullin (Uzbekistan)

24 July 2026 ASEAN Championship	Cambodia	1–2	Singapore	Phnom Penh, Cambodia
19:00 UTC+7	Ouk 55'	Report	Shawal 22'; Ilhan Fandi 90+12'	Stadium: Morodok Techo National Stadium; Attendance: 27,790; Referee: Koji Takasaki (Japan); Player of the Match: Ilhan Fandi

27 July 2026 ASEAN Championship	Singapore	2–0	Timor-Leste	Kallang, Singapore
19:00 UTC+8	Ilhan Fandi 41'; Song 56'	Report		Stadium: Jalan Besar Stadium; Attendance: 4,665; Referee: Salman Ahmad Falahi (Qatar); Player of the Match: Ilhan Fandi

31 July 2026 ASEAN Championship	Vietnam	0–0	Singapore	Hanoi, Vietnam
20:00 UTC+7		Report		Stadium: Mỹ Đình National Stadium; Attendance: 31,569; Referee: Hiroki Kasahara (Japan); Player of the Match: Hariss Harun

7 August 2026 ASEAN Championship	Singapore	1–1	Indonesia	Kallang, Singapore
21:00 UTC+8	Ilhan 66'	Report	Oratmangoen 47'	Stadium: Jalan Besar Stadium; Attendance: 5,113; Referee: Abdullah Salim Khalfan Al-Amouri (Oman); Player of the Match: Jacob Mahler

15 August 2026 ASEAN Championship	Singapore	1–3	Thailand	Kallang, Singapore
21:00 UTC+8	Ilhan 85'		Teerasak Poeiphimai 14', 25'; Seksan Ratree 50'	Stadium: Jalan Besar Stadium; Referee: Salim Said Al-Majarafi (Oman)

18 August 2026 ASEAN Championship	Thailand	1–2	Singapore	Bangkok, Thailand
21:00 UTC+8	Kakana Khamyok 61' (pen.)		Harhys Stewart 45'; Pansa Hemviboon 63' (o.g.)	Stadium: Rajamangala Stadium; Referee: Kim Woo-sung (South Korea)

25 September 2026 FIFA ASEAN Cup Group A	Indonesia	2–0	Singapore	Jakarta, Indonesia
20:00 UTC+7	Ragnar Oratmangoen 13'; Ole Romeny 74' (pen.)	Report		Stadium: Gelora Bung Karno Stadium; Attendance: 38,702; Referee: Rustam Lutfullin (Uzbekistan)

28 September 2026 FIFA ASEAN Cup Group A	Singapore	1–0	Bangladesh	Jakarta, Indonesia
15:00 MYT	H. Stewart 35'	Report		Stadium: Gelora Bung Karno Stadium; Referee: Mongkolchai Pechsri (Thailand)

1 October 2026 FIFA ASEAN Cup Group A	Malaysia	6–0	Singapore	Bandung, Indonesia
18:30 UTC+7	Bérgson 8' (pen.), 62', 90+3'; Wilkin 26'; Josué 76'; Bashah 87'	FIFA Report; GSA Report		Stadium: Si Jalak Harupat Stadium; Referee: Kim Jong-hyeok (South Korea)

13 November Mizuho Blue Challenge - The Kallang Football Series Singapore	Singapore	1–4	Paraguay	Kallang, Singapore
20:00 UTC+8	Song Ui-young 30'		Caballero 7', 53'; Maurício 45'; Enciso 82'	Stadium: National Stadium; Attendance: 14,360; Referee: Wiwat Jumpaoon (Thailand)

17 November Mizuho Blue Challenge - The Kallang Football Series Singapore	Singapore	0–7	Brazil	Kallang, Singapore
18:00 UTC+8			Vinícius 9', 15', 21'; Endrick 31'; Estêvão 51'; Rayan 65'; Suhaimi 74' (o.g.)	Stadium: National Stadium

=== 2027 ===
25 December 2027 AFC Asian Cup	Australia	v	Singapore	Al Khobar, Saudi Arabia
--:-- UTC+3				Stadium: Aramco Stadium

30 December 2027 AFC Asian Cup	Singapore	v	Tajikistan	Riyadh, Saudi Arabia
--:-- UTC+3				Stadium: Imam Mohammed Ibn Saud University Stadium

=== 2028 ===
4 January 2027 AFC Asian Cup	Iraq	v	Singapore	Al Khobar, Saudi Arabia
--:-- UTC+3				Stadium: Aramco Stadium

== Coaching staff ==
Position	Name
Team manager	(Singapore) Anders Aplin (Singapore) Matthew Tay
Head coach	(Singapore) Gavin Lee
Assistant coach	(Singapore) Fahrudin Mustafić
Assistant coach	(Singapore) Noh Rahman
Assistant coach	(Singapore) Firdaus Kassim
Goalkeeper coach	(Singapore) Rameshpal Singh
Fitness Coach	(Bosnia and Herzegovina) Dževad Šarić
Match analyst	(Japan) Satoru Okada
Head football science and medicine	(Malaysia) Firdaus Maasar
Senior sports trainer	(Singapore) Nasruldin Baharuddin
Sports trainer	(Singapore) Fazly Hasan (Singapore) Ryan Wang
Masseur	(Singapore) Gurnaya Singh
Sports scientist	(Singapore) Faizal Khalid Abdul Aziz
Lead physiotherapist	(Singapore) Nurhafizah Abu Sujad
Kit manager	(Singapore) Omar Mohd
Media officer	(Singapore) Chia Pui San

=== Coaching history ===
- (Straits Settlements) Lim Yong Liang (1936–1941)
- (Singapore) Rahim Sattar (1960–1963)
- (Singapore) Harith Omar (1963–1965)
- (Singapore) Choo Seng Quee (1964–1967, 1971, 1976–1977)
- (Bulgaria) Lozan Kotsev (1967–1968)
- (Singapore) Yap Boon Chuan (1968–1971)
- (England) Mick Walker (1972–1974)
- (Singapore) Ibrahim Awang (1974–1975)
- (England) Trevor Hartley (1975–1976)
- (Singapore) Sebastian Yap (1977–1978)
- (Singapore) Jita Singh (1979–1984, 1989)
- (Singapore) Hussein Aljunied (1984–1986)
- (Singapore) Seak Poh Leong (1987–1988)
- (Malaysia) Robin Chan (1990–1992)
- (Czechoslovakia) Milouš Kvaček (1992)
- (Singapore) P. N. Sivaji (1992–1993)
- (England) Ken Worden (1994) (Note: Officially appointed as national coach on 1 January 1994.)
- (England) Douglas Moore (1994–1995) (Note: Appointed S.League CEO in May 1995.)
- (England) Barry Whitbread (1995–1998)
- (Singapore) Vincent Subramaniam (1998–2000)
- (Denmark) Jan B. Poulsen (2000–2003)
- (Serbia) Radojko Avramović (2003–2012)
- (Singapore) V. Sundramoorthy (2013, 2016–2018)
- (Germany) Bernd Stange (2013–2016)
- (Singapore) Fandi Ahmad (2018)
- (Singapore) Nazri Nasir (caretaker) (2019, 2022)
- (Japan) Tatsuma Yoshida (2019–2021)
- (Japan) Takayuki Nishigaya (2022–2024)
- (Japan) Tsutomu Ogura (2024–2025)
- (Singapore) Gavin Lee (2025–present)

=== Coaching statistics ===
The following table provides a summary of the Singapore national team under each coach. Includes both competitive and friendly matches.

As of 3 Dec 2025

Manager	Singapore career	Pld	W	D	L	Win %	Achievements
(Czechoslovakia) Milouš Kvaček	February 1992 – May 1992	0	0	0	0	—	
(Singapore) P. N. Sivaji	May 1992 – December 1993	0	0	0	0	—	1993 Southeast Asian Games – bronze
(England) Ken Worden	January 1994 – March 1994	0	0	0	0	—	
(England) Douglas Moore	March 1994 – May 1995	0	0	0	0	—	
(England) Barry Whitbread	June 1995 – November 1998	31	13	9	9	41.9	1995 Southeast Asian Games – bronze 1998 AFF Championship – champions
(Singapore) Vincent Subramaniam	December 1998 – December 2000	0	0	0	0	—	
(Denmark) Jan Poulsen	December 2000 – January 2003	0	0	0	0	—	
(Serbia) Radojko Avramović	July 2003 – December 2012	64	24	13	27	37.5	2004 AFF Championship – champions 2007 AFF Championship – champions 2012 AFF Championship – champions
(Singapore) V. Sundramoorthy	January 2013 – May 2013	1	0	0	1	0.0	
(Germany) Bernd Stange	May 2013 – April 2016	32	15	3	14	46.9	
(Singapore) V. Sundramoorthy	May 2016 – April 2018	23	3	5	15	13.0	
(Singapore) Fandi Ahmad	May 2018 – December 2018	8	5	1	2	62.5	
(Singapore) Nazri Nasir	March 2019 – June 2019	2	1	1	0	50.0	
(Japan) Tatsuma Yoshida	June 2019 – December 2021	19	6	4	9	31.6	
(Singapore) Nazri Nasir (caretaker)	March 2022 – April 2022	2	2	0	0	100.0	
(Japan) Takayuki Nishigaya	May 2022 – January 2024	21	8	5	8	38.1	
(Japan) Tsutomu Ogura	February 2024 – June 2025	16	5	3	8	31.3	
(Singapore) Gavin Lee (interim)	June 2025 – November 2025	6	3	1	2	50.0	2027 AFC Asian Cup – Qualification
(Singapore) Gavin Lee	November 2025 – present						

== Players ==
=== Current squad ===
The following 25 players were called up for the Mizuho Blue Challenge – The Kallang Football Series Singapore.

Caps and goals are correct as of 17 November 2026, after the match against Brazil.

No.	Pos.	Player	Date of birth (age)	Caps	Goals	Club
1	GK	Izwan Mahbud	14 July 1990 (age 36)	85	0	(Football Association of Singapore) Young Lions
12	GK	Syazwan Buhari	22 September 1992 (age 34)	5	0	(Football Association of Singapore) Tampines Rovers
23	GK	Ridhuan Barudin	23 March 1987 (age 39)	0	0	(Football Association of Singapore) Hougang United
2	DF	Darren Teh	19 September 1996 (age 30)	4	0	(Football Association of Singapore) Balestier Khalsa
3	DF	Ryhan Stewart	15 February 2000 (age 26)	44	0	(Football Association of Singapore) Lion City Sailors
5	DF	Raoul Suhaimi	18 September 2005 (age 21)	3	0	(Football Association of Singapore) Tampines Rovers
14	DF	Hariss Harun (captain)	19 November 1990 (age 35)	160	11	(Football Association of Singapore) Lion City Sailors
15	DF	Lionel Tan	5 June 1997 (age 29)	38	3	(Football Association of Singapore) Lion City Sailors
21	DF	Safuwan Baharudin	22 September 1991 (age 35)	137	14	(Football Association of Malaysia) Selangor
24	DF	Joshua Pereira	10 October 1997 (age 29)	7	0	(Football Association of Singapore) Geylang International
4	MF	Saifullah Akbar	31 January 1999 (age 27)	6	0	(Football Association of Singapore) Hougang United
6	MF	Kyoga Nakamura	25 April 1996 (age 30)	30	2	(Football Association of Singapore) Lion City Sailors
7	MF	Song Ui-young	8 November 1993 (age 33)	44	10	(Football Association of Singapore) Lion City Sailors
8	MF	Shah Shahiran	14 November 1999 (age 27)	52	1	(Football Association of Singapore) Tampines Rovers
9	MF	Farhan Zulkifli	10 November 2002 (age 24)	22	1	(Football Association of Singapore) Lion City Sailors
11	MF	Glenn Kweh	26 March 2000 (age 26)	42	2	(Football Association of Singapore) Lion City Sailors
13	MF	Harhys Stewart	20 March 2001 (age 25)	28	3	(Football Association of Thailand) Chiangrai United
16	MF	Hami Syahin	16 December 1998 (age 27)	48	0	(Football Association of Singapore) Lion City Sailors
17	MF	Haziq Kamarudin	6 March 2001 (age 25)	1	0	(Football Association of Singapore) FC Jurong
18	MF	Jacob Mahler	10 April 2000 (age 26)	27	3	(Football Association of Singapore) Tampines Rovers
22	MF	Joel Chew	9 February 2000 (age 26)	16	0	(Football Association of Singapore) Young Lions
25	MF	Woo Chun Wei	7 December 2004 (age 21)	0	0	(Football Association of Singapore) Balestier Khalsa
10	FW	Nathan Mao	26 March 2008 (age 18)	3	0	(Football Association of Singapore) Young Lions
19	FW	Ilhan Fandi	8 November 2002 (age 24)	36	10	(Football Association of Singapore) Lion City Sailors
20	FW	Shawal Anuar	29 April 1991 (age 35)	62	20	(Football Association of Singapore) Lion City Sailors

=== Recent call-ups ===
The following players have also been called up to the Singapore squad within the last twelve months.

Pos.	Player	Date of birth (age)	Caps	Goals	Club	Latest call-up
DF	Nur Adam Abdullah	13 April 2001 (age 25)	22	0	(Singapore) Lion City Sailors	v. Malaysia, 1 October 2026
DF	Irfan Najeeb	31 July 1999 (age 27)	15	1	(Singapore) Tampines Rovers	v. Malaysia, 1 October 2026
DF	Akram Azman	21 November 2000 (age 25)	3	0	(Singapore) FC Jurong	v. Thailand, 18 August 2026
DF	Amirul Adli	13 January 1996 (age 30)	44	1	(Singapore) Tampines Rovers	v. Thailand, 18 August 2026
DF	Irfan Fandi	13 August 1997 (age 29)	58	2	(Singapore) Tampines Rovers	v. Thailand, 18 August 2026
DF	Luth Harith	19 March 2008 (age 18)	0	0	(Singapore) Young Lions	v. Thailand, 18 August 2026
DF	Zulqarnaen Suzliman	29 March 1998 (age 28)	27	0	(Singapore) Hougang United	v. China, 5 June 2026
MF	Jared Gallagher	18 January 2002 (age 24)	0	0	(Singapore) Tanjong Pagar United	v. Hong Kong, 18 November 2025
MF	Jonan Tan	27 June 2006 (age 20)	0	0	(Croatia) Dugopolje	v. India, 14 October 2025
MF	Ong Yu En	3 October 2003 (age 23)	0	0	(Singapore) Tampines Rovers	v. India, 14 October 2025
FW	Faris Ramli	24 August 1992 (age 34)	93	15	(Singapore) Tampines Rovers	v. Malaysia, 1 October 2026
FW	Ikhsan Fandi	9 April 1999 (age 27)	49	23	(Japan) Thespa Gunma	v. China, 5 June 2026
FW	Jordan Emaviwe	9 April 2001 (age 25)	11	0	(Singapore) Hougang United	v. China, 5 June 2026
FW	Abdul Rasaq Akeem	16 June 2001 (age 25)	6	0	(Singapore) Lion City Sailors	v. Bangladesh, 31 March 2026
Notes: ^{INJ} Player withdrew from the squad due to an injury; ^{INV} Player invite to join the squad for training; ^{PRE} Preliminary squad; ^{STA} Player on standby; ^{SUS} Player suspended; ^{RET} Retired from the national team; ^{WD} Player withdrew from the squad

== Player records ==
As of 18 August 2026
Players in bold are still active with Singapore.

=== Most appearances ===
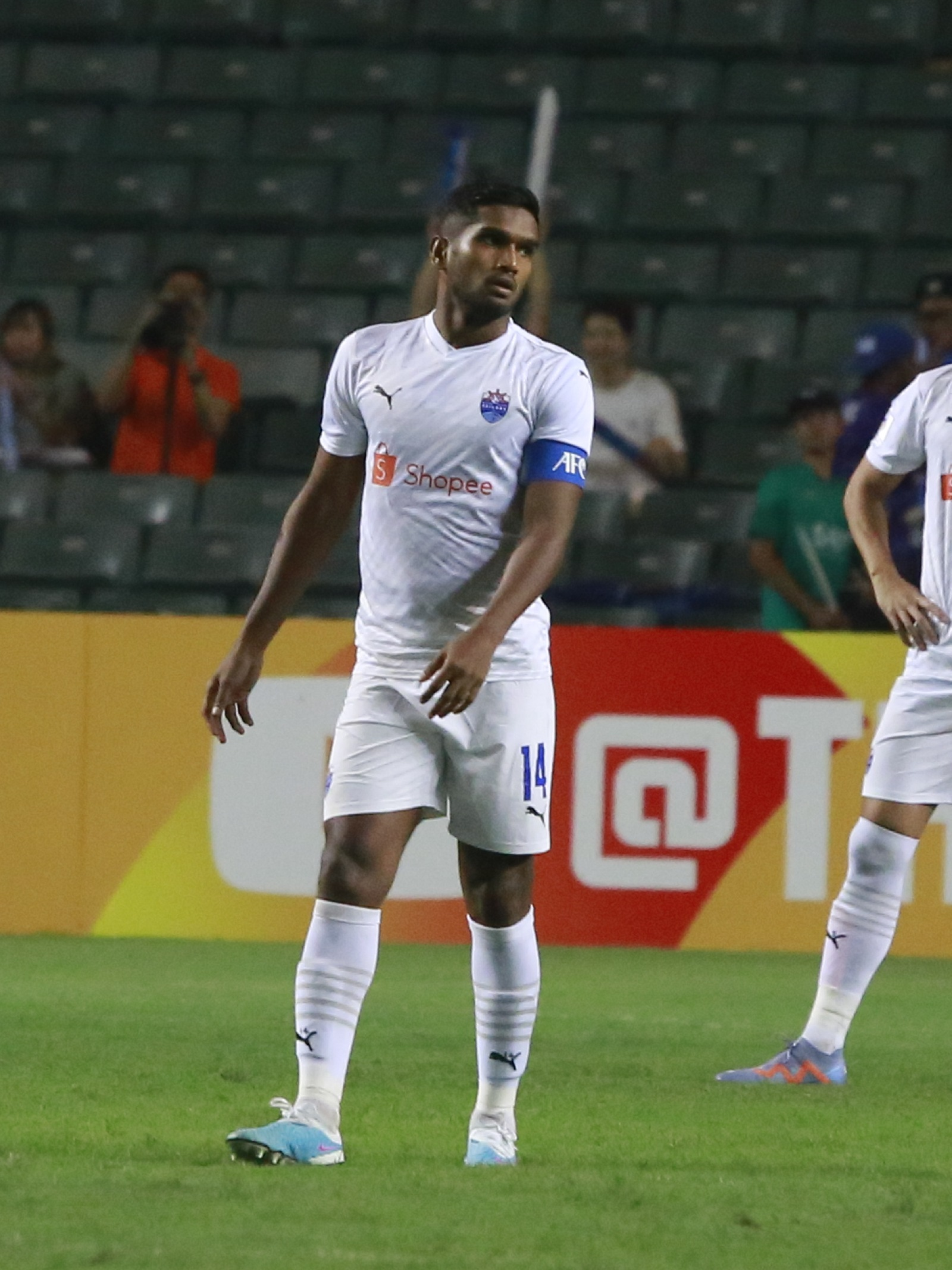
Hariss Harun is Singapore's most-capped player, with 155 appearances.

Rank	Player	Caps	Goals	Career
1	**Hariss Harun**	155	11	2007–present
2	Daniel Bennett	147	7	2002–2017
3	Shahril Ishak	145	15	2003–2018
4	Baihakki Khaizan	144	5	2003–2021
5	Khairul Amri	136	32	2004–2019
6	**Safuwan Baharudin**	133	14	2010–present
7	Malek Awab	121	0	1980–1996
7	Aide Iskandar	121	0	1995–2007
9	Shunmugham Subramani	115	0	1996–2007
9	Hassan Sunny	115	0	2004–2024

NB: Historical appearance records may be incomplete, particularly for Samad Allapitchay and Dollah Kassim.

=== Top goalscorers ===
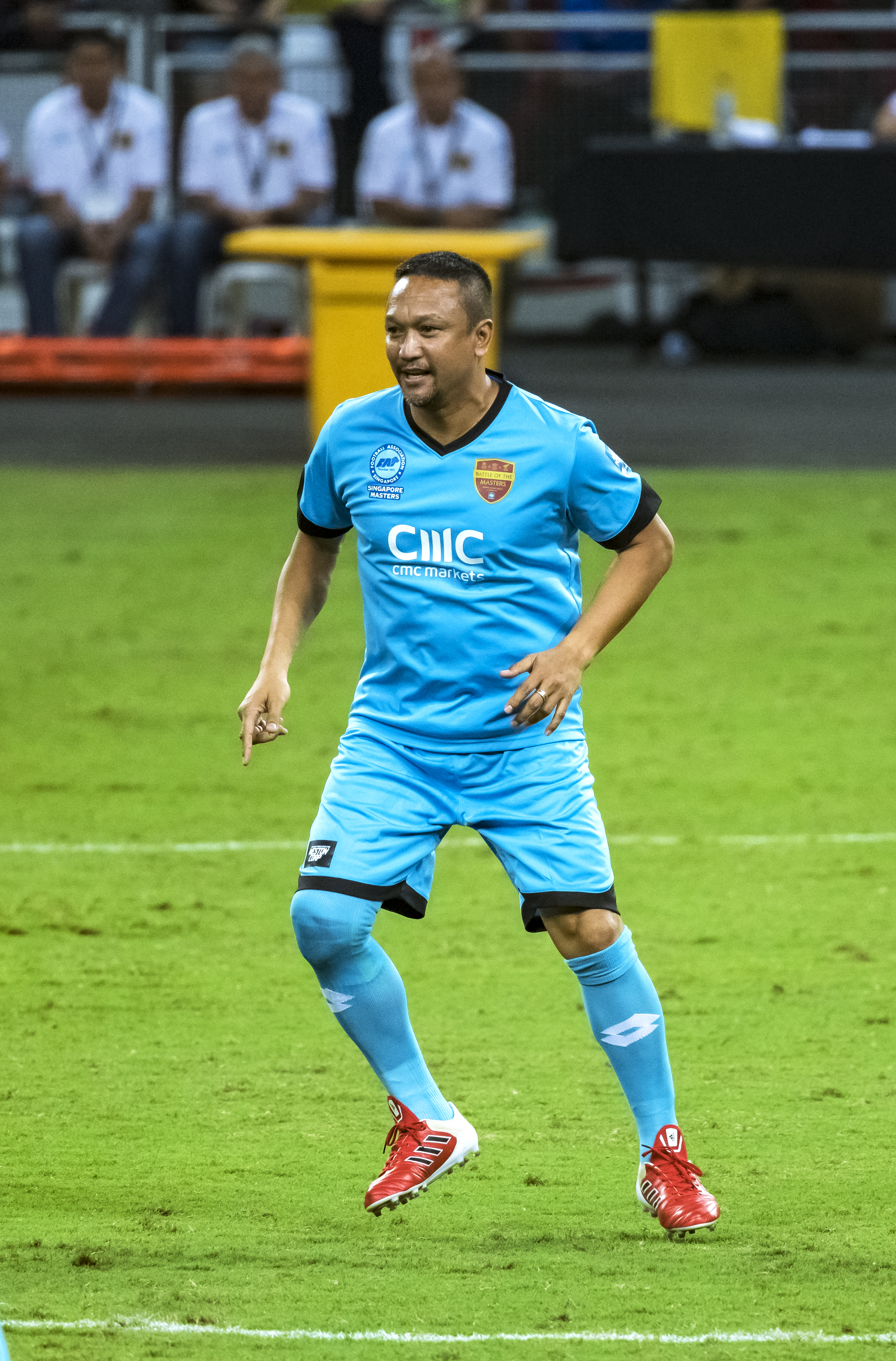
Fandi Ahmad at a charity game in 2017. He is Singapore's top goalscorer, with 55 goals.

Rank	Player	Goals	Caps	Ratio	Career
1	Fandi Ahmad	55	101	0.54	1979–1997
2	Noh Alam Shah	34	82	0.41	2001–2010
3	Khairul Amri	32	135	0.24	2004–2019
4	Indra Sahdan Daud	30	113	0.27	1997–2013
5	Aleksandar Đurić	27	59	0.46	2007–2012
6	**Ikhsan Fandi**	23	49	0.47	2017–present
7	Varadaraju Sundramoorthy	20	48	0.42	1983–1995
7	**Shawal Anuar**	20	58	0.34	2016–present
9	Rafi Ali	16	76	0.21	1994–2004
10	Agu Casmir	15	45	0.33	2004–2012
10	**Faris Ramli**	15	92	0.16	2013–present
10	Shahril Ishak	15	145	0.1	2003–2018

=== Statistics ===
Youngest capped player: Hariss Harun (16 years 7 months 5 days) vs North Korea, 24 June 2007

Oldest capped player: Aleksandar Đurić (42 years 4 months 10 days) vs Thailand, 22 December 2012

Youngest goalscorer: Jacob Mahler (18 years 6 months 6 days) vs Cambodia, 16 October 2018

Oldest goalscorer: Aleksandar Đurić (42 years 3 months 13 days) vs Malaysia, 25 November 2012

Most goals scored in a single match: Noh Alam Shah (7 goals) vs Laos, 15 January 2007

== Competitive record ==
=== FIFA World Cup ===
FIFA World Cup record										Qualification record					
Year	Result	Position	Pld	W	D*	L	GF	GA	Squad	Pld	W	D	L	GF	GA
(Uruguay) 1930	Not a FIFA member									Not a FIFA member					
(Italy) 1934	Not a FIFA member									Not a FIFA member					
(France) 1938	Not a FIFA member									Not a FIFA member					
(Brazil) 1950	Not a FIFA member									Not a FIFA member					
(Switzerland) 1954	Did not enter									Did not enter					
(Sweden) 1958	Did not enter									Did not enter					
(Chile) 1962	Did not enter									Did not enter					
(England) 1966	Did not enter									Did not enter					
(Mexico) 1970	Did not enter									Did not enter					
(West Germany) 1974	Did not enter									Did not enter					
(Argentina) 1978	Did not qualify									5	2	1	2	5	7
(Spain) 1982	Did not qualify									3	0	1	2	1	3
(Mexico) 1986	Did not qualify									4	0	1	3	2	11
(Italy) 1990	Did not qualify									6	2	1	3	12	9
(United States) 1994	Did not qualify									8	5	0	3	12	12
(France) 1998	Did not qualify									4	0	1	3	2	8
(South Korea) (Japan) 2002	Did not qualify									6	0	2	4	3	8
(Germany) 2006	Did not qualify									6	1	0	5	3	13
(South Africa) 2010	Did not qualify									10	5	1	4	17	17
(Brazil) 2014	Did not qualify									8	1	1	6	8	24
(Russia) 2018	Did not qualify									8	3	1	4	9	9
(Qatar) 2022	Did not qualify									8	2	1	5	7	22
(Canada) (Mexico) (United States) 2026	Did not qualify									8	2	1	5	8	25
(Morocco) (Portugal) (Spain) 2030	To be determined									To be determined					
(Saudi Arabia) 2034	To be determined									To be determined					
Total		0/19	–	–	–	–	–	–	—	84	23	12	49	89	168

=== AFC Asian Cup ===
AFC Asian Cup record										Qualification record					
Year	Result	Position	Pld	W	D*	L	GF	GA	Squad	Pld	W	D	L	GF	GA
(Hong Kong) 1956	Withdrew									Withdrew					
(South Korea) 1960	Did not qualify									2	0	0	2	3	9
(Israel) 1964	Withdrew									Withdrew					
(Iran) 1968	Did not qualify									4	0	1	3	2	10
(Thailand) 1972	Withdrew									Withdrew					
(Iran) 1976	Did not qualify									3	1	0	2	7	3
(Kuwait) 1980	Did not qualify									3	0	0	3	1	11
(Singapore) 1984	Group stage	7th	4	1	1	2	3	4	Squad	Qualified as hosts					
(Qatar) 1988	Withdrew									Withdrew					
(Japan) 1992	Did not qualify									3	0	1	2	2	4
(United Arab Emirates) 1996	Did not qualify									6	3	3	0	16	7
(Lebanon) 2000	Did not qualify									3	2	0	1	2	3
(China) 2004	Did not qualify									8	3	1	4	8	11
(Indonesia) (Malaysia) (Thailand) (Vietnam) 2007	Did not qualify									5	1	1	3	4	6
(Qatar) 2011	Did not qualify									6	2	0	4	6	15
(Australia) 2015	Did not qualify									6	1	0	5	4	17
(United Arab Emirates) 2019	Did not qualify									14	3	3	8	12	18
(Qatar) 2023	Did not qualify									11	3	1	7	14	27
(Saudi Arabia) 2027	Qualified									9	3	1	5	8	25
Total	Group stage	1/18	4	1	1	2	3	4	—	82	21	12	49	89	166

=== ASEAN Championship ===
ASEAN Championship record
Year	Result	Position	Pld	W	D*	L	GF	GA	Squad
(Singapore) 1996	Group stage	5th	4	2	1	1	7	2	Squad
(Vietnam) 1998	Champions	1st	5	4	1	0	9	2	Squad
(Thailand) 2000	Group stage	5th	4	2	0	2	4	2	Squad
(Indonesia) (Singapore) 2002	Group stage	6th	3	1	1	1	3	6	Squad
(Malaysia) (Vietnam) 2004	Champions	1st	8	6	2	0	23	10	Squad
(Singapore) (Thailand) 2007	Champions	1st	7	2	5	0	18	6	Squad
(Indonesia) (Thailand) 2008	Semi-finals	3rd	5	3	1	1	10	2	Squad
(Indonesia) (Vietnam) 2010	Group stage	5th	3	1	1	1	3	3	Squad
(Malaysia) (Thailand) 2012	Champions	1st	7	4	1	2	11	6	Squad
(Singapore) (Vietnam) 2014	Group stage	6th	3	1	0	2	6	7	Squad
(Myanmar) (Philippines) 2016	Group stage	7th	3	0	1	2	1	3	Squad
(ASEAN) 2018	Group stage	6th	4	2	0	2	7	5	Squad
(Singapore) 2020	Semi-finals	4th	6	3	1	2	10	8	Squad
(ASEAN) 2022	Group stage	5th	4	2	1	1	6	6	Squad
(ASEAN) 2024	Semi-finals	4th	6	2	1	3	8	10	Squad
(ASEAN) 2026	Semi-finals	3rd	6	3	2	1	8	6	Squad
Total	4 Titles	16/16	78	38	19	21	133	84	—

=== Asian Games ===
Asian Games record
Year	Result	Pld	W	D*	L	GF	GA	Squad
(India) 1951	Did not enter							
(Philippines) 1954	Group stage	2	0	1	1	2	7	Squad
(Japan) 1958	Group stage	2	0	0	2	2	4	Squad
(Indonesia) 1962	Did not enter							
(Thailand) 1966	Fourth place	7	2	1	4	11	15	Squad
(Thailand) 1970	Did not enter							
(Iran) 1974	Did not enter							
(Thailand) 1978	Did not enter							
(India) 1982	Did not enter							
(South Korea) 1986	Did not enter							
(China) 1990	Group stage	3	1	0	2	7	13	Squad
(Japan) 1994	Did not enter							
(Thailand) 1998	Did not enter							
Since 2002	See Singapore national under-23 football team							
Total	Fourth place	14	3	2	9	22	39	—

=== Southeast Asian Games ===
Southeast Asian Games record
Year	Result	Pld	W	D*	L	GF	GA
(Thailand) 1959	Did not enter						
(Myanmar) 1961	Did not enter						
(Cambodia) 1963	Cancelled						
(Malaysia) 1965	Preliminary round	2	0	0	2	1	6
(Thailand) 1967	Did not enter						
(Myanmar) 1969	Did not enter						
(Malaysia) 1971	Group stage	2	0	0	2	2	11
(Singapore) 1973	Fourth place	4	1	2	1	2	4
(Thailand) 1975	Bronze medalists	3	0	2	1	4	5
(Malaysia) 1977	Group stage	2	0	0	2	1	7
(Indonesia) 1979	Group stage	4	1	1	2	4	8
(Philippines) 1981	Fourth place	4	1	1	2	5	4
(Singapore) 1983	Silver medalists	4	3	0	1	12	3
(Thailand) 1985	Silver medalists	4	2	1	1	6	4
(Indonesia) 1987	Group stage	2	0	2	0	0	0
(Malaysia) 1989	Silver medalists	4	2	1	1	7	4
(Philippines) 1991	Bronze medalists	4	2	2	0	4	1
(Singapore) 1993	Bronze medalists	5	3	2	0	16	5
(Thailand) 1995	Bronze medalists	6	3	2	1	11	5
(Indonesia) 1997	Fourth place	6	2	2	2	6	6
(Brunei) 1999	Fourth place	6	3	2	1	8	5
Since 2001	See Singapore national under-23 football team						
Total	3 Silver medals	62	23	20	19	89	78

=== FIFA ASEAN Cup ===
FIFA ASEAN Cup record
Year	Result	Pld	W	D	L	GF	GA
(Indonesia) 2026	Group stage	3	1	0	2	1	8

=== Singapore squad during AFF Championship winning years ===
The usual starting line-up
1998 AFF Championship	2004 AFF Championship	2006 AFF Championship	2012 AFF Championship

== Head-to-head record ==
More wins Wins equal losses More losses

As of 17 November 2026, after match against Brazil.

Opponent	First	Last	Pld	W	D	L	GF	GA	GD	Confederation
Afghanistan	2015	2021	4	1	1	2	4	5	–1	AFC
Argentina	2017	2017	1	0	0	1	0	6	–6	CONMEBOL
Australia	1967	2008	8	0	1	7	4	22	–22	AFC / OFC
Azerbaijan	2012	2012	1	0	1	0	2	2	0	UEFA
Bahrain	1981	2017	10	1	1	8	5	18	−13	AFC
Bangladesh	1973	2026	7	4	2	1	8	5	+3	AFC
Brazil	2026	2026	1	0	0	1	0	7	−7	CONMEBOL
Brunei	1975	2015	24	19	4	1	71	11	60	AFC
Cambodia	1957	2026	21	16	2	3	43	16	27	AFC
Canada	1986	1986	2	0	0	2	0	2	−2	CONCACAF
China	1980	2026	20	3	6	13	18	47	−29	AFC
Chinese Taipei	2011	2024	5	2	0	3	9	9	0	AFC
Denmark	2010	2010	1	0	0	1	1	5	–4	UEFA
Fiji	2018	2018	1	1	0	0	2	0	2	OFC
Finland	1997	1997	1	0	0	1	0	1	–1	UEFA
Germany	1975	1975	1	0	0	1	1	4	−3	UEFA
Ghana	1982	1982	1	0	0	1	0	3	−3	CAF
Guam	2015	2023	3	2	1	0	2	5	1	AFC
Hong Kong	1958	2025	26	7	9	10	30	35	–5	AFC
India	1959	2025	14	7	3	4	20	13	7	AFC
Indonesia	1958	2026	62	18	14	30	77	117	−40	AFC
Iran	1984	2010	3	0	1	2	2	10	−8	AFC
Iraq	1978	2012	6	1	0	5	5	22	−15	AFC
Israel	1958	1958	1	0	0	1	1	2	−1	UEFA
Japan	1959	2015	28	3	2	23	21	67	−46	AFC
Jordan	2002	2019	8	1	1	6	6	16	−10	AFC
Kazakhstan	2006	2006	1	0	1	0	0	0	0	UEFA
North Korea	1975	2010	11	2	1	8	10	20	–10	AFC
South Korea	1953	2024	38	2	3	33	22	117	–95	AFC
Kuwait	1973	2022	10	1	3	6	6	18	−12	AFC
Kyrgyzstan	2001	2022	4	0	1	3	3	6	–3	AFC
Laos	1970	2022	13	11	1	1	40	10	30	AFC
Lebanon	1997	2017	5	2	1	2	6	5	1	AFC
Macau	2000	2023	4	3	1	0	6	2	–4	AFC
Malaysia	1958	2026	83	26	22	34	98	129	–31	AFC
Maldives	1996	2025	7	7	0	0	23	5	18	AFC
Mauritius	2018	2018	1	0	1	0	1	1	0	CAF
Mongolia	2018	2026	2	2	0	0	6	0	6	AFC
Morocco	1970	1970	1	0	0	1	0	1	−1	CAF
Myanmar	1985	2025	41	19	8	14	78	71	7	AFC
Nepal	1982	2025	4	3	0	1	12	1	11	AFC
Netherlands	1984	1984	1	0	0	1	1	2	–1	UEFA
New Zealand	1967	2001	7	1	1	5	6	13	−7	OFC
Norway	1992	2004	2	0	0	2	2	6	−4	UEFA
Oman	1988	2019	10	1	1	8	7	26	−19	AFC
Pakistan	1981	2012	4	3	0	1	13	2	11	AFC
Paraguay	2026	2026	1	0	0	1	1	4	–3	CONMEBOL
Palestine	2003	2021	6	3	2	2	10	6	4	AFC
Papua New Guinea	2014	2023	3	2	1	0	6	4	2	OFC
Philippines	1962	2022	25	16	4	5	55	15	45	AFC
Poland	2010	2010	1	0	0	1	1	6	−5	UEFA
Qatar	1984	2019	13	1	1	11	5	30	−25	AFC
Russia	1999	1999	1	0	1	0	1	1	0	UEFA
Saudi Arabia	1981	2021	11	0	2	9	3	26	−23	AFC
Solomon Islands	2019	2023	2	1	1	0	5	4	1	OFC
Sri Lanka	1972	1979	3	2	0	1	9	6	3	AFC
Sweden	1979	1979	1	0	0	1	0	5	–5	UEFA
Syria	1978	2016	6	2	0	4	7	11	–4	AFC
Tajikistan	2007	2023	4	1	1	2	3	4	-1	AFC
Thailand	1957	2026	71	11	18	42	73	127	−53	AFC
Timor-Leste	2018	2026	4	4	0	0	13	1	12	AFC
Turkmenistan	2009	2017	3	2	1	0	6	4	2	AFC
United Arab Emirates	1982	2007	6	0	1	5	6	15	−11	AFC
Uruguay	2002	2002	1	0	0	1	1	2	–1	CONMEBOL
Soviet Union	1974	1974	2	0	0	2	0	4	−4	UEFA
Uzbekistan	2008	2021	4	0	0	4	4	16	–12	AFC
Vietnam	1954	2026	35	5	13	19	38	63	–25	AFC
Yemen	2019	2019	2	1	1	0	4	3	1	AFC
Yugoslavia	1985	1985	2	0	1	1	1	3	−2	UEFA

Opponent	Played	Won	Drawn	Lost	Goals for	Goals against	Goal difference	% Won	Confederation
All	636	187	120	329	799	1120	–321	29.40%	FIFA

=== Regional record ===
Last meet up against Southeast Asia countries
Opponents	Date	Score	Outcome	Match type
Brunei	6 June 2015	5−1	Won	Friendly
Cambodia	24 July 2026	2−1	Won	2026 ASEAN Championship
Laos	27 December 2022	2−0	Won	2022 AFF Championship
Malaysia	1 October 2026	0−6	Lost	2026 FIFA ASEAN Cup
Myanmar	14 November 2024	3−2	Won	Friendly
Philippines	29 March 2022	2−0	Won	2022 FAS Tri-Nations Series
Timor-Leste	27 July 2026	2−0	Won	2026 ASEAN Championship
Vietnam	31 July 2026	0−0	Draw	2026 ASEAN Championship
Indonesia	25 September 2026	0−2	Lost	2026 FIFA ASEAN Cup
Thailand	18 August 2026	1−2	Won	2026 ASEAN Championship

== Honours ==
=== Regional ===
- ASEAN Championship
  - (gold) Champions (4): 1998, 2004, 2007, 2012
  - (bronze) Third place (1): 2008
- SEA Games
  - (silver) Silver medal (3): 1983, 1985, 1989
  - (bronze) Bronze medal (4): 1975, 1991, 1993, 1995

=== Friendly ===
- Tri-Nations Series (1): 2022

== See also ==
- Singapore national football team results
- Singapore national under-23 football team
- Singapore national youth football team
- Young Lions
- Singapore women's national football team
- Football in Singapore
- Football Association of Singapore
- Singapore FA

== Notes and references ==
=== References ===
Achievements
Preceded by 1996 Thailand	AFF Championship; 1998 (First title)	Succeeded by 2000 Thailand
Preceded by 2002 Thailand	AFF Championship; 2004 (Second title); 2007 (Third title)	Succeeded by 2008 Vietnam
Preceded by 2010 Malaysia	AFF Championship; 2012 (Fourth title)	Succeeded by 2014 Thailand
