= Tsutomu Ogura =

Japanese footballer and coach

Tsutomu Ogura 小倉 勉
Personal information
- Date of birth: July 18, 1966 (age 60)
- Place of birth: Osaka, Japan
- Height: 1.75 m (5 ft 9 in)
- Position: Midfielder

Youth career
- 1982–1984: Settsu High School

College career
Years	Team	Apps	(Gls)
1985–1988	Tenri University		

Managerial career
- 1990–1992: Werder Bremen (youth)
- 1996–2005: JEF United Chiba (assistant)
- 2006–2010: Japan (assistant)
- 2010–2012: Japan Olympics (assistant)
- 2013: Ōmiya Ardija
- 2014–2015: Ventforet Kofu (assistant)
- 2015–2016: JEF United Chiba (assistant)
- 2018–2022: Yokohama F. Marinos (sporting director)
- 2022–2023: Tokyo Verdy (assistant)
- 2024–2025: Singapore

Tsutomu Ogura (小倉 勉, Ogura Tsutomu; born July 18, 1966) is a Japanese football manager and former player. He was most recently the head coach of the Singapore national team.

== Managerial career ==
In 1990, Ogura was selected to become the head coach of the Germany club Werder Bremen youth.

Ogura became the assistant coach for JEF United Ichihara from 1996 until 2005 seeing the club win the 2005 J.League Cup while working under head coach Ivica Osim.

In 2006, Ogura became assistant coach for the Japan national team under managers rejoining Ivica Osim (2006–2007) and Takeshi Okada (2008–2010) where Ogura was part of the squad that advanced to the knockout round in during 2010 FIFA World Cup.

After the FIFA World Cup, Ogura became an assistant coach for the Japan U23 national team aiming to qualify for the 2012 Summer Olympics under manager Takashi Sekizuka. Japan advanced to the semi-finals in 2012 Summer Olympics.

After the Summer Olympics, Ogura became the assistant coach for Omiya Ardija, a Japanese club playing in the J1 League under manager Zdenko Verdenik. In August 2013, Verdenik was fired and Ogura was promoted to head coach where he got his coaching duties on 24 August 2013 in a 3–2 lost to Kashiwa Reysol.

Later, Ogura became the assistant coach for Ventforet Kofu (2014–2015) and JEF United Chiba (2015–2016). He then served as the sporting director for Yokohama F. Marinos from 2018 to 2022. Later on, Ogura became an assistant manager for Tokyo Verdy under Hiroshi Jofuku, notably being present when Tokyo Verdy got promoted to the J1 League at the end of the 2023 J2 League season.

=== Singapore ===
On 1 February 2024, the Football Association of Singapore (FAS) announced the appointment of Ogura as the head coach of the Singapore national team. He became the third consecutive Japanese head coach for the Lions. On 21 March 2024, in his first match coaching the Lions, Ogura led the team to a 2–2 draw against the China after being down 2–0 in the first half in the 2026 FIFA World Cup qualification.

Ogura was also tasked to lead Singapore with a fresh new squad for the 2024 ASEAN Championship. With star players like Ikhsan Fandi, Ilhan Fandi, Irfan Fandi, Harhys Stewart, Jacob Mahler, Anumanthan Mohan Kumar and Song Ui-young are not selected in the squad. Ogura managed to carry the team to the semi-finals of the tournament.

On 24 June 2025, Ogura stepped down as the national team head coach, due to personal reasons.

== Managerial statistics ==
As of 24 June 2025

Managerial record by team and tenure
Team	Nat	From	To	Record				
Team	Nat	From	To	G	W	D	L	Win %
Omiya Ardija	(Japan)	20 August 2013	31 January 2014	16	5	0	11	31.25
Singapore	(Singapore)	1 February 2024	24 June 2025	16	5	3	8	31.25
Career Total				32	10	3	19	31.25
