= Barry Whitbread =

English footballer (1949–2026)

Personal information
- Date of birth: October 1948
- Place of birth: Manchester, England
- Date of death: 9 September 2026 (aged 77)
- Position: Forward

Senior career*
Years	Team	Apps	(Gls)
1971–1973	Lancaster City	120	(51)
1973–1979	Runcorn		
1979–1982	Altrincham	94	(34)

International career
1979–1981	England semi-pro	6	(2)

Managerial career
- 1988–1990: Runcorn
- 1996–1998: Singapore
- * Club domestic league appearances and goals

Barry Whitbread (October 1948 – 9 September 2026) was an English football player and coach who led the Singapore national team to the country's first ever international trophy in football, the 1998 AFF Championship.

== Club career ==
Whitbread was born in Manchester in October 1948. He played football as a forward for Lancaster City in the Northern Premier League while a student at Lancaster University. He scored a hat-trick on his debut for the club, and scored their early goal in what became a 2–1 defeat to Football League opponents Notts County in the first round proper of the 1972–73 FA Cup. Transferred nearer home for a fee of £250, Whitbread's 29 goals helped Runcorn to the Northern Premier League title in the 1975–76 season. After scoring 181 career goals for Runcorn, he joined Altrincham in 1979 for a club record fee of £6,400. He helped the club reach the 1982 FA Trophy final, in which he made his final appearance as a player, on the losing side.

== International career ==
Whitbread was a member of the first ever England team at semi-professional level. He won six caps, scoring twice, between 1979 and 1981.

== Coaching career ==
Whitbread trained as a teacher before moving into football management, having gained his coaching qualifications while still a player. He was assistant manager of Northwich Victoria, then manager of Runcorn from 1988 to 1990, and also coached in the United States. He took the job as Singapore national team coach in 1996. Two years later, his team written off before it started, Whitbread led Singapore to victory in the 1998 Tiger Cup (now known as the AFF Suzuki Cup), their first ever success in an international football competition.

On his return to England he worked at Liverpool's Youth Academy, becoming head of recruitment, a post he held until 2007. He went on to act as chief scout for clubs including Blackburn Rovers and Bolton Wanderers.

== Personal life and death ==
His son Zak, born in Houston, Texas, while Whitbread was working in the US, became a professional footballer after developing in the Liverpool academy.

Whitbread died on 9 September 2026, aged 77.
