= Jan B. Poulsen =

Danish footballer and manager (born 1946)

Personal information
- Full name: Jan Børge Poulsen
- Date of birth: 23 March 1946 (age 80)
- Place of birth: Store Heddinge, Denmark

Youth career
- Store Heddinge BK
- Rønne IK

Senior career*
Years	Team	Apps	(Gls)
1969–1976	Boldklubben Frem	155	(45)
1976–1978	Store Heddinge BK		

Managerial career
- 1976–1978: Store Heddinge BK
- 1979–1980: Boldklubben Frem (reserves)
- 1981–1982: Boldklubben Frem
- 1983–1986: Køge Boldklub
- 1987–1989: Boldklubben Frem
- 1990–1992: Denmark (assistant)
- 1992–1999: Denmark u-21
- 2001–2003: Singapore
- 2004: FC Bornholm
- 2005–2006: Lyngby BK (youth)
- 2006–2007: Jordan U-20
- 2008–2009: Armenia
- 2010–2012: Tanzania
- 2013–2014: Solrød FC
- 2014–2015: Haslev FC
- * Club domestic league appearances and goals

Jan Børge Poulsen (born 23 March 1946) is a Danish football manager and former player who played as midfielder, spending most of his professional career at Boldklubben Frem.

== Coaching career ==
During the 1980s Poulsen coached Boldklubben Frem and Køge Boldklub.

In 1990, he was named Richard Møller Nielsen's assistant for the Denmark national team, and he was part of the team that won the Euro 1992. After the win in 1992 he was promoted to head coach of the Denmark U21 national team. He had this job until 1999, when he was named new sporting director of the Singapore national team. When Vincent Subramaniam was sacked in 2001 due to bad results, Poulsen stepped in to replace him. This did not help Singapore and Poulsen himself was sacked in 2002.

He then returned to Denmark to a couple of minor coaching jobs. In 2006, he made an agreement with Greve Fodbold to become new head coach, but at the same time he got the offer to become coach of the Jordan U-20s. In the end he accepted the job from Jordan.

In January 2008, he accepted an offer to become the head coach of the Armenia national team. On 30 March 2009, Poulsen was relieved of his duties from the Football Federation of Armenia.

Poulsen took over as the head coach of Tanzania national team in August 2010 after being appointed by the Tanzanian Football Federation from a short-list of five from 59 applicants. After four months in charge of the team, he led Tanzania to victory in the 2010 CECAFA Cup - the first win of the country since 1994. He left Tanzania in May 2012 and was replaced by his fellow Dane and namesake Kim Poulsen.

In August 2013 he became new manager of the Danish lower league club Solrød FC. In the summer of 2014 he was named new manager of Haslev FC.
