= Milouš Kvaček =

Personal information
- Date of birth: 19 November 1933
- Place of birth: Czechoslovakia
- Date of death: 14 May 2010 (aged 76)
- Position: Striker

Senior career*
Years	Team	Apps	(Gls)
–1957	Mladá Boleslav		
1957–1964	Spartak Hradec Králové		
1964–1966	Jablonec		
1966–1967	Sydney Prague		
1967–1968	Slovan Liberec		

Managerial career
- 1975–1976: Mladá Boleslav
- 1985–1987: Czechoslovakia U-21
- 1989–1990: Kedah
- 1991: Kuala Lumpur
- 1992: Singapore
- 1993–1994: Perak
- 1994–1995: Kelantan
- * Club domestic league appearances and goals

Milouš Kvaček (19 November 1933 – 14 May 2010) was a Czech professional football player and manager who played for the Spartak Hradec Králové side that won the 1959–60 Czechoslovak First League title.

== Playing career ==
Kvaček spent most of his playing career in the Czechoslovak First League, playing for FK Mladá Boleslav, Spartak Hradec Králové, TJ Jablonec nad Jisou and FC Slovan Liberec. He also had a brief spell playing in Australia for Sydney Prague. Overall, he appeared in 141 Czechoslovak First League matches and scored 52 league goals.

== Career as manager ==
Following retirement as a player, he managed several clubs, including FK Mladá Boleslav in the second division in the 1975–76 season. He also led the Czechoslovakia Olympic football team, and also coached teams in Malaysia and Singapore. He led Kedah FA into two Malaysia Cup finals, winning the 1990 final.

In Singapore, he had a brief stint as national team coach in 1992 and also coached the Singapore Lions in Malaysia Cup. Kvacek also worked as a technical director for SAFFC in the S.League from 1996 to 1997.
