= Football at the 2011 SEA Games – Men's team squads =

Below are the squads for the Football at the 2011 SEA Games, hosted by Indonesia, which took place between 3 and 22 November 2011.

== Group A ==
=== Indonesia ===
Coach: (Indonesia) Rahmad Darmawan

No.	Pos.	Player	Date of birth (age)	Caps	Club
1	GK	Kurnia Meiga	7 May 1990 (aged 21)	10	Arema Indonesia
2	DF	Seftia Hadi	26 September 1991 (aged 20)	5	(Indonesia) PSPS Pekanbaru
5	DF	Yericho Christiantoko	14 January 1992 (aged 19)	1	(Belgium) C.S. Visé
6	MF	Mahadirga Lasut	17 August 1988 (aged 23)	2	(Indonesia) Persija Jakarta
7	FW	Yongki Aribowo	23 November 1989 (aged 21)	13	(Indonesia) Persisam Putra Samarinda
8	MF	Egi Melgiansyah (c)	4 September 1990 (aged 21)	4	(Indonesia) Pelita Jaya
10	FW	Oktovianus Maniani	27 October 1990 (aged 21)	3	(Indonesia) Persiram Raja Ampat
11	MF	Ramdani Lestaluhu	5 November 1991 (aged 19)	1	(Indonesia) Persija Jakarta
12	GK	Andritany Ardhiyasa	26 December 1991 (aged 19)	3	(Indonesia) Persija Jakarta
13	DF	Gunawan Dwi Cahyo	20 April 1989 (aged 22)	4	(Indonesia) Persijap Jepara
14	FW	Lukas Mandowen	6 April 1989 (aged 22)	0	(Indonesia) Persipura Jayapura
15	DF	Hasyim Kipuw	5 September 1988 (aged 23)	2	(Indonesia) Persija Jakarta
17	FW	Ferdinand Sinaga	8 September 1988 (aged 23)	1	(Indonesia) Semen Padang
18	MF	Stevie Bonsapia	10 May 1988 (aged 23)	3	(Indonesia) Persipura Jayapura
21	FW	Andik Vermansyah	23 November 1991 (aged 19)	2	(Indonesia) Persebaya 1927
24	DF	Diego Michiels	8 August 1990 (aged 21)	2	(Indonesia) Pelita Jaya
25	FW	Titus Bonai	4 March 1989 (aged 22)	2	(Indonesia) Persipura Jayapura
26	MF	Hendro Siswanto	12 March 1990 (aged 21)	5	Arema Indonesia
27	FW	Patrich Wanggai	27 June 1988 (aged 23)	2	(Indonesia) Persidafon Dafonsoro
28	DF	Abdul Rahman	14 May 1988 (aged 23)	2	(Indonesia) Pelita Jaya

=== Malaysia ===
Coach: (Malaysia) Ong Kim Swee

No.	Pos.	Player	Date of birth (age)	Caps	Club
1	GK	Khairul Fahmi	7 January 1989 (aged 22)	56	(Malaysia) Kelantan
2	FW	Mahalli Jasuli	2 April 1989 (aged 22)	52	(Malaysia) Harimau Muda A
3	DF	Zubir Azmi	14 November 1991 (aged 19)	27	(Malaysia) Terengganu
4	DF	Fadhli Shas	21 January 1991 (aged 20)	55	(Malaysia) Johor Darul Ta'zim
6	DF	Asraruddin Putra	26 March 1988 (aged 23)	36	(Malaysia) Selangor
7	MF	Irfan Fazail	12 April 1991 (aged 20)	4	(Malaysia) Harimau Muda A
8	MF	Shukur Jusoh	28 February 1989 (aged 22)	1	(Malaysia) Terengganu
9	FW	A. Thamil Arasu	4 July 1991 (aged 20)	0	(Malaysia) Harimau Muda A
10	MF	Baddrol Bakhtiar (c)	1 February 1988 (aged 23)	58	(Malaysia) Kedah Darul Aman
11	MF	K. Gurusamy	11 January 1989 (aged 22)	14	(Malaysia) Harimau Muda A
13	FW	Fakri Saarani	8 July 1989 (aged 22)	30	(Malaysia) Negeri Sembilan
14	FW	Izzaq Faris	18 April 1990 (aged 21)	4	(Malaysia) Harimau Muda A
15	DF	Amer Saidin	25 July 1992 (aged 19)	0	(Malaysia) Sarawak United
17	DF	Fandi Othman	25 April 1992 (aged 19)	1	(Malaysia) Kedah Darul Aman
18	FW	Syahrul Azwari	12 January 1993 (aged 18)	2	(Malaysia) Kelantan United
19	FW	Wan Zaharulnizam	8 May 1991 (aged 20)	2	(Malaysia) Melaka United
20	GK	Izham Tarmizi	24 April 1991 (aged 20)	7	(Malaysia) Johor Darul Ta'zim
21	MF	Nazmi Faiz	16 August 1994 (aged 17)	12	(Malaysia) Johor Darul Ta'zim
24	DF	Muslim Ahmad	25 April 1989 (aged 22)	27	(Malaysia) Sri Pahang
28	DF	Yong Kuong Yong	18 September 1988 (aged 23)	4	(Malaysia) Kuala Lumpur

=== Singapore ===
Coach: (Singapore) Fandi Ahmad

=== Thailand ===
Coach: (Thailand) Prapol Pongpanich

No.	Pos.	Player	Date of birth (age)	Caps	Club
1	GK	Pattanan Pijittham	4 February 1989 (aged 22)		(Thailand) Chainat
2	DF	Weerawut Kayem	23 March 1993 (aged 18)		(Thailand) Muangthong United
3	DF	Seeket Madputeh	9 March 1989 (aged 22)		(Thailand) Pattaya United
4	MF	Attapong Nooprom	13 February 1990 (aged 21)		(Thailand) Sriracha
5	DF	Ekkasit Chaobut	30 March 1991 (aged 20)		(Thailand) Bangkok F.C.
6	FW	Adisak Kraisorn	1 February 1991 (aged 20)		(Thailand) Buriram PEA
7	DF	Chalermsuk Kaewsuktae	9 May 1989 (aged 22)		(Thailand) Chainat
8	MF	Sarach Yooyen	30 May 1992 (aged 19)		(Thailand) F.C. Phuket
9	FW	Ronnachai Rangsiyo (c)	1 August 1988 (aged 23)		(Thailand) BEC Tero Sasana
10	MF	Naruphol Ar-Romsawa	16 September 1988 (aged 23)		(Thailand) Muangthong United
11	FW	Issarapong Lilakorn	30 January 1988 (aged 23)		(Thailand) Sisaket
12	MF	Kroekrit Thaweekarn	19 November 1990 (aged 20)		(Thailand) Sriracha
13	MF	Phonlawut Donjui	3 July 1988 (aged 23)		(Thailand) Bangkok United
14	FW	Natarid Thammarossopon	14 March 1988 (aged 23)		(Thailand) BEC Tero Sasana
15	DF	Theerathon Bunmathan	6 February 1990 (aged 21)		(Thailand) Buriram PEA
16	DF	Sujarit Jantakul	4 March 1989 (aged 22)		(Thailand) Sriracha
17	MF	Pokklaw Anan	4 March 1991 (aged 20)		(Thailand) Police United
18	GK	Ukrit Wongmeema	9 July 1991 (aged 20)		(Thailand) Buriram
19	DF	Tanapol Udomlap	15 February 1989 (aged 22)		(Thailand) TTM
20	DF	Komkrit Camsokchuerk	20 April 1989 (aged 22)		(Thailand) Roi Et United

=== Cambodia ===
Coach: (South Korea) Lee Tae-Hoon

No.	Pos.	Player	Date of birth (age)	Caps	Club
1	GK	Sou Yaty	17 December 1991 (aged 19)	1	(Cambodia) National Defense Ministry
2	DF	Lay Raksmey	29 October 1989 (aged 22)	11	(Cambodia) Preah Khan Reach
3	DF	Sok Rithy	30 December 1990 (aged 20)	6	(Cambodia) Preah Khan Reach
4	DF	Sok Sovan	5 April 1992 (aged 19)	4	(Cambodia) Phnom Penh Crown
5	DF	Touch Pancharong	5 March 1990 (aged 21)	7	(Cambodia) Boeung Ket Rubber Field
6	DF	Moul Daravron	27 May 1990 (aged 21)	2	Unattached
7	FW	Prak Mony Udom	24 March 1994 (aged 17)	7	(Cambodia) Preah Khan Reach
8	FW	Sok Pheng	20 October 1990 (aged 21)	3	(Cambodia) Phnom Penh Crown
9	MF	Tum Saray	10 July 1992 (aged 19)	3	(Cambodia) Preah Khan Reach
10	FW	Keo Sokngon	30 April 1992 (aged 19)	8	(Cambodia) Phnom Penh Crown
11	FW	Khoun Laboravy (c)	25 August 1988 (aged 23)	13	(Cambodia) Preah Khan Reach
12	DF	Pheak Rady	22 January 1989 (aged 22)	5	(Cambodia) Phnom Penh Crown
13	MF	Samut Dalin	8 March 1992 (aged 19)	1	(Cambodia) Khemara Keila
14	MF	Sos Suhana	4 April 1992 (aged 19)	8	(Cambodia) Phnom Penh Crown
15	MF	Pov Phearith	10 May 1992 (aged 19)	2	(Cambodia) National Defense Ministry
16	MF	Chhun Sothearath	2 February 1990 (aged 21)	3	(Cambodia) Build Bright University
17	MF	Chhin Chhoeun	10 September 1992 (aged 19)	9	(Cambodia) National Defense Ministry
18	MF	Phourng Soksana	2 March 1990 (aged 21)	4	(Cambodia) National Defense Ministry
19	MF	Soun Veasna	25 March 1994 (aged 17)	2	(Cambodia) Preah Khan Reach
20	GK	Um Vichet	27 November 1993 (aged 17)	1	(Cambodia) National Defense Ministry

== Group B ==
=== Vietnam ===
Coach: (Germany) Falko Götz

No.	Pos.	Player	Date of birth (age)	Caps	Club
1	GK	Nguyễn Tuấn Mạnh	31 July 1990 (aged 21)	2	(Vietnam) Hoàng Anh Gia Lai
2	DF	Dương Thanh Hào	23 June 1991 (aged 20)	2	(Vietnam) TĐCS Đồng Tháp
3	DF	Nguyễn Thành Long Giang	6 September 1988 (aged 23)	20	(Vietnam) Navibank Sài Gòn
4	DF	Âu Văn Hoàn	1 October 1989 (aged 22)	2	(Vietnam) Sông Lam Nghệ An
5	MF	Ngô Hoàng Thịnh	9 January 1992 (aged 19)	1	(Vietnam) Sông Lam Nghệ An
6	DF	Nguyễn Quốc Long	19 February 1988 (aged 23)	1	(Vietnam) Hà Nội T&T
7	FW	Hoàng Đình Tùng	24 August 1988 (aged 23)	6	(Vietnam) Thanh Hóa
8	MF	Nguyễn Trọng Hoàng	April 14, 1989 (aged 22)	12	(Vietnam) Sông Lam Nghệ An
9	FW	Lê Văn Thắng	8 February 1990 (aged 21)	2	(Vietnam) Thanh Hóa
10	MF	Lê Hoàng Thiên	25 December 1990 (aged 20)	4	(Vietnam) Hoàng Anh Gia Lai
12	FW	Nguyễn Văn Quyết	27 June 1991 (aged 20)	4	(Vietnam) Hà Nội T&T
14	DF	Chu Ngọc Anh	1 January 1989 (aged 22)	2	(Vietnam) Mikado Nam Định
15	DF	Trương Huỳnh Phú	25 August 1989 (aged 22)	2	(Vietnam) Đồng Tâm Long An
17	DF	Bùi Xuân Hiếu	1 January 1990 (aged 21)	4	(Vietnam) Hoàng Anh Gia Lai
18	GK	Trần Bửu Ngọc	14 June 1991 (aged 20)	5	(Vietnam) TĐCS Đồng Tháp
19	MF	Phạm Thành Lương (c)	10 September 1988 (aged 23)	6	(Vietnam) Hà Nội
20	MF	Đinh Thanh Trung	24 January 1988 (aged 23)	3	(Vietnam) Hà Nội
22	MF	Hoàng Văn Bình	1 February 1989 (aged 22)	2	(Vietnam) Sông Lam Nghệ An
25	FW	Nguyễn Tuấn Anh	19 August 1989 (aged 22)	2	(Vietnam) Đồng Nai Berjaya
28	DF	Lâm Anh Quang	24 April 1991 (aged 20)	3	(Vietnam) Mikado Nam Định

=== Myanmar ===
Coach: (Sweden) Stefan Hansson

No.	Pos.	Player	Date of birth (age)	Caps	Club
1	GK	Kyaw Zin Htet	2 March 1990 (aged 21)	7	(Myanmar) Kanbawza
2	DF	Nyarna Lwin	2 July 1990 (aged 21)	2	(Myanmar) Kanbawza
3	DF	Moe Win	30 August 1988 (aged 23)	3	(Myanmar) Naypyidaw
4	DF	Zaw Min Tun	20 May 1992 (aged 19)	6	(Myanmar) Magway
5	DF	Yan Aung Win	9 September 1992 (aged 19)	6	(Myanmar) Yangon United
6	DF	Aye San (c)	24 December 1988 (aged 22)	4	(Myanmar) Kanbawza
7	MF	Yan Aung Kyaw	4 August 1989 (aged 22)	4	(Myanmar) Yangon United
8	MF	Aung Myint Aye	3 March 1988 (aged 23)	3	(Myanmar) Yadanarbon
9	MF	Min Min Thu	30 March 1988 (aged 23)	5	(Myanmar) Ayeyawady United
10	FW	Kyaw Ko Ko	20 December 1992 (aged 18)	6	(Myanmar) Zeyashwemye
11	FW	Pyae Phyo Oo	16 July 1990 (aged 21)	3	(Myanmar) Ayeyawady United
12	MF	Kyi Lin	4 September 1992 (aged 19)	3	(Myanmar) Yangon United
13	DF	Kyaw Kyaw Myo	11 August 1989 (aged 22)	2	(Myanmar) Kanbawza
14	MF	Kyaw Zayar Win	2 May 1991 (aged 20)	6	(Myanmar) Kanbawza
15	DF	Zaw Zaw Oo	22 July 1989 (aged 22)	6	(Myanmar) Ayeyawady United
16	FW	Mai Aih Naing	18 October 1990 (aged 21)	2	(Myanmar) Kanbawza
17	MF	Min Min Tun	23 January 1988 (aged 23)	1	(Myanmar) Yadanarbon
18	GK	Thiha Sithu	1 January 1988 (aged 23)	5	(Myanmar) Ayeyawady United
19	DF	Shwe Hlaing Win	15 December 1988 (aged 22)	2	(Myanmar) Zeyashwemye
20	GK	Hein Kyaw Thu	1 January 1988 (aged 23)	5	(Myanmar) Hantharwady United

=== Timor-Leste ===
Coach: (Brazil) Antonio Carlos Vieira

No.	Pos.	Player	Date of birth (age)	Caps	Club
1	GK	Juliao Monteiro	17 July 1993 (aged 18)	0	
2	DF	Raul Isac	2 February 1988 (aged 23)	1	(Australia) North Sunshine Eagles
3	MF	Adelino Trindade	2 June 1995 (aged 16)	0	
5	DF	Welington Rocha	4 October 1990 (aged 21)	1	(Brazil) São Bernardo
6	DF	Francisco Sarmento	10 September 1992 (aged 19)	0	(Timor-Leste) Sporting Lorosae
7	MF	Antonio Marcos Sousa	2 February 1990 (aged 21)	1	(Brazil) Botafogo-DF
10	MF	Jesse Pinto (c)	1 May 1990 (aged 21)	1	
11	MF	José Gusmão Carvalho		1	
12	FW	Teodoro Soares Bau		0	
13	FW	Antonio Cabral Abel		1	
15	DF	Costantino Guterres		1	
16	DF	João Paulo da Costa de Jesus		0	
17	MF	Fidel dos Santos de Araujo	30 July 1993 (aged 18)	0	(Timor-Leste) Ad. Cova Lima
18	MF	João Paulo Pereira da Silva		1	
19	FW	Alan Leandro Pinheiro	19 January 1989 (aged 22)	1	(Brazil) Vila Nova
20	GK	Emerson Cesario	16 February 1990 (aged 21)	1	(Brazil) Corinthians
21	MF	Leroy Guerreiro	28 April 1991 (aged 20)	0	
25	FW	Murilo de Almeida	21 January 1989 (aged 22)	5	(Indonesia) Persiraja Banda Aceh
26	DF	Diogo Rangel	19 August 1991 (aged 20)	0	(Brazil) Radium FC

=== Laos ===
Coach: (Austria) Hans-Peter Schaller

No.	Pos.	Player	Date of birth (age)	Caps	Club
1	GK	Sourasay Keosouvandeng	20 February 1992 (aged 19)		(Laos) Yotha
2	MF	Paseuthsack Souliyavong	26 October 1990 (aged 21)		(Laos) Yotha
3	DF	Moukda Souksavath	14 July 1989 (aged 22)		(Laos) Vientiane
4	DF	Ketsada Souksavanh	23 November 1992 (aged 18)		(Laos) Ezra
5	MF	Konekham Inthammavong	10 July 1992 (aged 19)		(Laos) Lao Bank
6	DF	Saychone Khunsamnarn	13 January 1993 (aged 18)		(Laos) Lao Army
7	MF	Soukaphone Vongchiengkham	9 March 1992 (aged 19)		(Laos) Ezra
8	FW	Lamnao Singto (c)	15 April 1988 (aged 23)		(Laos) Yotha
9	FW	Sangvone Phimmasen	16 November 1989 (aged 21)		(Laos) Vientiane
10	MF	Kanlaya Sysomvang	3 November 1990 (aged 21)		(Thailand) Khonkaen
11	MF	Keoviengphet Liththideth	30 November 1992 (aged 18)		(Laos) Ezra
12	MF	Phatthana Syvilay	4 October 1990 (aged 21)		(Laos) Yotha
16	MF	Manolom Phomsouvanh	26 September 1992 (aged 19)		(Laos) Ezra
18	GK	Chintana Souksavath	20 July 1990 (aged 21)		(Laos) Yotha
19	MF	Sopha Saysana	9 December 1992 (aged 18)		(Thailand) Nong Khai
20	DF	Khamphoumy Hanvilay	2 December 1990 (aged 20)		(Laos) Yotha
21	MF	Vilayuth Sayyabounsou	27 November 1992 (aged 18)		(Laos) Ezra
25	GK	Souvanhpheng Phanthavong	18 July 1990 (aged 21)		(Laos) Yotha
26	DF	Sengdao Inthilath	11 November 1994 (aged 16)		(Laos) Ezra
27	MF	Khouanta Sivongthong	5 March 1992 (aged 19)		(Laos) Yotha

=== Brunei ===
Coach: (Brunei) Dayem Ali

No.	Pos.	Player	Date of birth (age)	Caps	Club
1	GK	Junaidi Akim		3	(Brunei) QAF FC
2	DF	Azri Zahari	12 February 1992 (aged 19)	4	(Brunei) Majra FC
3	DF	Zaim Jaya		0	(Brunei) QAF FC
5	DF	Reduan Petara	25 May 1988 (aged 23)	4	(Brunei) AM Gunners
6	DF	Arif Ali Rahman	25 January 1989 (aged 22)	4	(Brunei) Jerudong FC
7	MF	Azwan Saleh (c)	6 January 1988 (aged 23)	4	(Brunei) DPMM FC
8	MF	Nurrul Aleshahnezan Metali	21 January 1989 (aged 22)	3	(Brunei) Majra FC
9	FW	Hamizan Aziz Sulaiman	24 January 1989 (aged 22)	4	(Brunei) QAF FC
10	MF	Hendra Azam Idris	10 August 1988 (aged 23)	5	(Brunei) QAF FC
11	MF	Najib Tarif	5 February 1988 (aged 23)	5	(Brunei) MS PDB
12	FW	Nazirul Nazreen Abdullah	24 June 1989 (aged 22)	4	(Brunei) Indera SC
13	DF	Fakharrazi Hassan	15 July 1989 (aged 22)	5	(Brunei) DPMM FC
14	MF	Petrus Jumat	11 June 1989 (aged 22)	1	(Brunei) QAF FC
16	DF	Micky Anak Gindi	30 November 1988 (aged 22)	5	(Brunei) QAF FC
18	GK	Omar Nur Aqammaddin	8 January 1990 (aged 21)	3	(Brunei) Indera SC
19	DF	Eddy Zulyadi Sapar		4	(Brunei) Jerudong FC
20	FW	Adi Said	15 October 1990 (aged 21)	5	(Brunei) Majra FC
21	DF	Ahmad Hafiz Said	13 January 1989 (aged 22)	4	(Brunei) Majra FC
22	MF	Yaziz Mat Yakof		1	(Brunei) Indera SC
25	MF	Abdul Hafiz Safwan Sulaiman			(Brunei) Indera SC

=== Philippines ===
Coach: (Germany) Michael Weiß

No.	Pos.	Player	Date of birth (age)	Caps	Club
1	GK	Roland Müller	2 March 1988 (aged 23)		(Germany) MSV Duisburg
4	DF	Jacques Van Bossche	18 February 1992 (aged 19)		(Belgium) Standaard Wetteren
7	FW	OJ Porteria	9 May 1994 (aged 17)		(United States) D.C. United Academy
8	MF	Manuel Ott	6 May 1992 (aged 19)		(Germany) FC Ingolstadt 04 II
9	FW	OJ Clarino	27 July 1990 (aged 21)		(Philippines) University of Santo Tomas
10	MF	Matthew Hartmann (c)	19 August 1989 (aged 22)		(Philippines) Loyola Agila
11	FW	Joshua Beloya	20 February 1991 (aged 20)		(Philippines) Ceres
12	MF	Jake Morallo	12 June 1988 (aged 23)		(Philippines) Loyola Agila
14	DF	Carli de Murga	30 November 1988 (aged 22)		(Spain) Racing Club Portuense
15	DF	David Basa	2 April 1989 (aged 22)		(Philippines) Global FC
16	MF	Patrick Hinrichsen	2 March 1991 (aged 20)		(Germany) SV Darmstadt 98 II
17	MF	Jason de Jong	28 February 1990 (aged 21)		(Netherlands) Dordrecht
18	MF	Mark Drinkuth	12 June 1991 (aged 20)		(Germany) DJK Agon 08 Düsseldorf
20	DF	Jeffrey Christiaens	17 May 1991 (aged 20)		(Belgium) Torhout
22	GK	Paolo Pascual	22 January 1991 (aged 20)		(Philippines) Global FC
23	FW	Mark Hartmann	20 January 1992 (aged 19)		(Philippines) Loyola Agila
24	MF	Marwin Angeles	9 January 1991 (aged 20)		(Philippines) Laos
26	DF	Reymark Fernandez	27 February 1991 (aged 20)		(Philippines) Diliman
27	DF	Neckson Leonora	22 March 1989 (aged 22)		(Philippines) Pachanga
28	FW	Gerardo Valmayor	8 June 1992 (aged 19)		(Philippines) Diliman
