= Football at the 2011 SEA Games =

2011 SEA Games football tournament
Sepak bola di SEA Games 2011

Tournament details
- Host country: Indonesia
- City: Jakarta
- Dates: 3–21 November
- Teams: 11 (from 1 confederation)
- Venue(s): Gelora Bung Karno Stadium; Lebak Bulus Stadium

Final positions
- Champions: Malaysia (6th title)
- Runners-up: Indonesia
- Third place: Myanmar
- Fourth place: Vietnam

Tournament statistics
- Matches played: 29
- Goals scored: 100 (3.45 per match)
- Top scorer: (Laos) Lamnao Singto (6 goals)

The association football tournament at the 2011 SEA Games (Indonesian: Sepak bola di SEA Games 2011) took place from 3 to 21 November 2011. This edition of the tournament was only for the men's competition. No women's competition was held as the host nation Indonesia did not have enough stadiums to host two categories of football at the same time, but other reasons were put into consideration, such as the poor performance of the Indonesian women's national team. As a result, it was played among U-23 (under 23 years old) national teams. All matches took place in Jakarta. This was the first time that all Southeast Asian nations participated in the football tournament at a SEA Games.

== Venues ==
Jakarta
Gelora Bung Karno Stadium	Lebak Bulus Stadium
6°13′7″S 106°48′9″E	6°17′20.79″S 106°46′36.16″E
Capacity: 88,083	Capacity: 12,000

== Group stage ==
All times are West Indonesian Time (WIB) – UTC+7.

Key to colours in group tables
Group winners and runners-up advanced to the semi-finals

=== Group A ===
In the last week of October 2011, the Football Association of Indonesia had rescheduled the first round of matches for the group twice, originally moving it forward to 8 November and eventually to 7 November. The second, third and fourth round of fixture had also been moved forward accordingly while the final round of fixtures remained on the 17th.

Team	Pld	W	D	L	GF	GA	GD	Pts
Malaysia	4	3	1	0	7	2	+5	10
Indonesia	4	3	0	1	11	2	+9	9
Singapore	4	2	1	1	4	3	+1	7
Thailand	4	1	0	3	6	7	−1	3
Cambodia	4	0	0	4	2	16	−14	0

7 November 2011
16:00

Singapore	0–0	Malaysia
	Report

Gelora Bung Karno Stadium, Jakarta
Referee: Chaiya Mahapab (Thailand)
7 November 2011
19:00

Indonesia	6–0	Cambodia
Bonai 28'; Wanggai 30', 41'; Gunawan 35'; Andik 82'; Ramdani 84'	Report

Gelora Bung Karno Stadium, Jakarta
Referee: U Win Htut (Myanmar)

9 November 2011
16:00

Malaysia	2–1	Thailand
Baddrol 24'; Izzaq 85'	Report	Natarid 78'

Gelora Bung Karno Stadium, Jakarta
Referee: Minoru Tōjō (Japan)
9 November 2011
19:00

Cambodia	1–2	Singapore
Chhoeun 35'	Report	Khairul 55'; Vanu 75'

Gelora Bung Karno Stadium, Jakarta
Referee: Suhaizi Shukri (Malaysia)

11 November 2011
14:00

Singapore	0–2	Indonesia
	Report	Wanggai 1'; Bonai 37'

Gelora Bung Karno Stadium, Jakarta
Referee: Steve Supresencia (Philippines)
11 November 2011
17:00

Thailand	4–0	Cambodia
Natarid 18'; Attapong 72', 82'; Kroekrit 75'	Report

Gelora Bung Karno Stadium, Jakarta
Referee: Nguyễn Hoàng Minh (Vietnam)

13 November 2011
16:00

Malaysia	4–1	Cambodia
Izzaq 7'; Baddrol 36' (pen.), 39'; Zaharulnizam 90'	Report	Chhoeun 61'

Gelora Bung Karno Stadium, Jakarta
Referee: Fahad Al-Kassar (United Arab Emirates)
13 November 2011
19:00

Indonesia	3–1	Thailand
Bonai 33'; Wanggai 62'; Sinaga 90+1'	Report	Ronnachai 51' (pen.)

Gelora Bung Karno Stadium, Jakarta
Referee: Kim Jong-Hyeok (South Korea)

17 November 2011
16:00

Thailand	0–2	Singapore
	Report	Gabriel 45'; Safirul 87'

Gelora Bung Karno Stadium, Jakarta
Referee: Steve Supresencia (Philippines)
17 November 2011
19:00

Indonesia	0–1	Malaysia
	Report	Syahrul 17'

Gelora Bung Karno Stadium, Jakarta
Referee: Fahad Al-Kassar (United Arab Emirates)

=== Group B ===
Team	Pld	W	D	L	GF	GA	GD	Pts
Vietnam	5	4	1	0	16	2	+14	13
Myanmar	5	4	1	0	13	2	+11	13
Timor-Leste	5	2	0	3	4	8	−4	6
Laos	5	1	1	3	10	11	−1	4
Brunei	5	1	1	3	5	17	−12	4
Philippines	5	1	0	4	6	14	−8	3

3 November 2011
16:00

Vietnam	3–1	Philippines
Mat. Hartmann 59' (o.g.); Lê Hoàng Thiên 73'; Nguyễn Văn Quyết 90+2'	Report	Ott 37'

Gelora Bung Karno Stadium, Jakarta
Referee: Oki Dwi Putra (Indonesia)
3 November 2011
19:00

Laos	2–3	Myanmar
Lamnao 64'; Sangvone 74'	Report	Kyaw Ko Ko 19'; Min Min Thu 70'; Yan Aung Win 78'

Gelora Bung Karno Stadium, Jakarta
Referee: Suhaizi Shukri (Malaysia)

5 November 2011
16:00

Brunei	1–2	Timor-Leste
Najib 25'	Report	Murilo 64', 72'

Lebak Bulus Stadium, Jakarta
Referee: Fahad Al-Kassar (United Arab Emirates)
5 November 2011
19:00

Myanmar	0–0	Vietnam
	Report

Lebak Bulus Stadium, Jakarta
Referee: Kim Jong-hyeok (South Korea)

7 November 2011
16:00

Timor-Leste	2–1	Philippines
Murilo 18'; Rangel 48'	Report	Porteria 36'

Lebak Bulus Stadium, Jakarta
Referee: Suhaizi Shukri (Malaysia)
7 November 2011
19:00

Laos	2–2	Brunei
Lamnao 18'; Manolom 80'	Report	Adi 35', 56'

Lebak Bulus Stadium, Jakarta
Referee: Oki Dwi Putra (Indonesia)

9 November 2011
16:00

Myanmar	4–0	Brunei
Kyaw Zayar Win 6'; Min Min Thu 32'; Kyaw Ko Ko 63'; Kyi Lin 78'	Report

Lebak Bulus Stadium, Jakarta
Referee: Fahad Al-Kassar (United Arab Emirates)
9 November 2011
19:00

Vietnam	2–0	Timor-Leste
Nguyễn Trọng Hoàng 51'; Âu Văn Hoàn 64'	Report

Lebak Bulus Stadium, Jakarta
Referee: Kim Jong-Hyeok (South Korea)

11 November 2011
16:00

Philippines	3–2	Laos
Ott 7'; Beloya 90', 90+3'	Report	Lamnao 38', 47'

Lebak Bulus Stadium, Jakarta
Referee: Oki Dwi Putra (Indonesia)
12 November 2011
16:00

Brunei	0–8	Vietnam
	Report	Nguyễn Văn Quyết 1', 13', 14'; Phạm Thành Lương 15'; Lê Văn Thắng 18'; Hoàng Văn Bình 30'; Lê Hoàng Thiên 57'; Hoàng Đình Tùng 72'

Lebak Bulus Stadium, Jakarta
Referee: Chaiya Mahapab (Thailand)

13 November 2011
16:00

Philippines	0–5	Myanmar
	Report	Aye San 11'; Kyaw Zayar Win 41'; Kyaw Ko Ko 46', 55'; Yan Aung Win 90+2'

Lebak Bulus Stadium, Jakarta
Referee: Minoru Tōjō (Japan)
13 November 2011
19:00

Timor-Leste	0–3	Laos
	Report	Paseuthsack 21'; Lamnao 42', 89' (pen.)

Lebak Bulus Stadium, Jakarta
Referee: Nguyễn Hoàng Minh (Vietnam)

15 November 2011
16:00

Myanmar	1–0	Timor-Leste
Mai Aih Naing 34'	Report

Lebak Bulus Stadium, Jakarta
Referee: Fahad Al-Kassar (United Arab Emirates)
15 November 2011
19:00

Philippines	1–2	Brunei
Beloya 9'	Report	Adi 17'; Reduan 42'

Lebak Bulus Stadium, Jakarta
Referee: Suhaizi Shukri (Malaysia)

17 November 2011
16:00

Laos	1–3	Vietnam
Keoviengphet 5'	Report	Hoàng Đình Tùng 64'; Nguyễn Văn Quyết 71'; Lê Văn Thắng 90'

Lebak Bulus Stadium, Jakarta
Referee: Minoru Tōjō (Japan)

== Knockout stage ==
Semi-finals
19 November
Malaysia	1
Myanmar	0
19 November
Vietnam	0
Indonesia	2

Final
21 November
Malaysia (p)	1 (4)
Indonesia	1 (3)
Third place
21 November
Myanmar	4
Vietnam	1

=== Semi-finals ===
19 November 2011
16:00

Malaysia	1–0	Myanmar
Fakri 85'	Report

Gelora Bung Karno Stadium, Jakarta
Referee: Kao Jung-Fang (Chinese Taipei)
19 November 2011
19:30

Vietnam	0–2	Indonesia
	Report	Wanggai 61'; Bonai 89'

Gelora Bung Karno Stadium, Jakarta
Referee: Kim Jong-Hyeok (South Korea)

=== Bronze medal match ===
21 November 2011
16:00

Myanmar	4–1	Vietnam
Kyaw Zayar Win 34'; Pyae Phyo Oo 55'; Ngô Hoàng Thịnh 72' (o.g.); Kyaw Ko Ko 84'	Report	Lâm Anh Quang 86'

Gelora Bung Karno Stadium, Jakarta
Referee: Fahad Al-Kassar (United Arab Emirates)

=== Gold medal match ===
21 November 2011
19:30

Malaysia	1–1 (a.e.t.)	Indonesia
Asraruddin 35'	Report	Gunawan 5'
Penalties
Mahalli (penalty scored); Fandi (penalty scored); Fakri (penalty missed); Fadhli (penalty scored); Baddrol (penalty scored)	4 – 3	(penalty scored) Bonai; (penalty missed) Gunawan; (penalty scored) Egi; (penalty scored) Abdul Rahman; (penalty missed) Sinaga

Gelora Bung Karno Stadium, Jakarta
Referee: Minoru Tōjō (Japan)

Malaysia	Indonesia

GK	1	Khairul Fahmi
RB	2	Mahalli Jasuli
CB	24	Muslim Ahmad
CB	4	Fadhli Shas
LB	3	Zubir Azmi
DM	11	K. Gurusamy	(yellow card) 10'	(substituted off) 78'
RM	13	Fakri Saarani	(yellow card) 61'
CM	10	Baddrol Bakhtiar (c)	(yellow card) 21'
CM	7	Irfan Fazail
LM	6	Asraruddin Putra		(substituted off) 99'
CF	9	A. Thamil Arasu		(substituted off) 81'
Substitutions:
MF	21	Nazmi Faiz		(substituted on) 78'
DF	28	Yong Kuong Yong	(yellow card) 113'	(substituted on) 81'
DF	17	Fandi Othman		(substituted on) 99'
Manager:
Ong Kim Swee

GK	1	Kurnia Meiga
CB	15	Hasyim Kipuw
CB	13	Gunawan Dwi Cahyo	(yellow card) 95'
CB	28	Abdul Rahman
RM	24	Diego Michiels
CM	6	Mahadirga Lasut		(substituted off) 71'
CM	8	Egi Melgiansyah (c)
LM	10	Okto Maniani	(yellow card) 60'
RF	21	Andik Vermansyah	(yellow card) 34'	(substituted off) 66'
CF	27	Patrich Wanggai		(substituted off) 97'
LF	25	Titus Bonai
Substitutions:
FW	17	Ferdinand Sinaga	(yellow card) 120'	(substituted on) 66'
MF	26	Hendro Siswanto		(substituted on) 71'
MF	11	Ramdani Lestaluhu		(substituted on) 97'
Manager:
Rahmad Darmawan

== Winners ==
2011 SEA Games Men's Tournament
(Malaysia)
Malaysia
Sixth title

== Awards ==
Most Valuable Player	Golden Boot
(Indonesia) Oktovianus Maniani	(Laos) Lamnao Singto

== Medal winners ==
Event	Gold	Silver	Bronze
Men's tournament	Malaysia (MAS); Khairul Fahmi; Mahalli Jasuli; Zubir Azmi; Fadhli Shas; Asraruddin Putra; Irfan Fazail; Shukur Jusoh; A. Thamil Arasu; Baddrol Bakhtiar (c); K. Gurusamy; Fakri Saarani; Izzaq Faris Ramlan; Amer Saidin; Fandi Othman; Syahrul Azwari; Wan Zaharulnizam; Izham Tarmizi; Nazmi Faiz; Muslim Ahmad; Yong Kuong Yong	Indonesia (INA); Kurnia Meiga; Seftia Hadi; Yericho Christiantoko; Mahadirga Lasut; Yongki Aribowo; Egi Melgiansyah (c); Okto Maniani; Ramdani Lestaluhu; Andritany Ardhiyasa; Gunawan Dwi Cahyo; Lukas Mandowen; Hasyim Kipuw; Ferdinand Sinaga; Stevie Bonsapia; Andik Vermansyah; Diego Muhammad; Titus Bonai; Hendro Siswanto; Patrich Wanggai; Abdul Rahman	Myanmar (MYA); Kyaw Zin Htet; Nyarna Lwin; Moe Win; Zaw Min Tun; Yan Aung Win; Aye San (c); Yan Aung Kyaw; Aung Myint Aye; Min Min Thu; Kyaw Ko Ko; Pyae Phyo Oo; Kyi Lin; Kyaw Kyaw Myo; Kyaw Zayar Win; Zaw Zaw Oo; Mai Aih Naing; Min Min Tun; Thiha Sithu; Shwe Hlaing Win; Hein Kyaw Thu

== Goalscorers ==
6 goals

- (Laos) Lamnao Singto

5 goals

- (Indonesia) Patrich Wanggai
- (Myanmar) Kyaw Ko Ko
- (Vietnam) Nguyễn Văn Quyết

4 goals

- (Indonesia) Titus Bonai

3 goals

- (Brunei) Adi Said
- (Malaysia) Baddrol Bakhtiar
- (Myanmar) Kyaw Zayar Win
- (Philippines) Joshua Beloya
- (Timor-Leste) Murilo de Almeida

2 goals

- (Cambodia) Chhin Chhoeun
- (Indonesia) Gunawan Dwi Cahyo
- (Malaysia) Izzaq Faris Ramlan
- (Myanmar) Min Min Thu
- (Myanmar) Yan Aung Win
- (Philippines) Manuel Ott
- (Thailand) Attapong Nooprom
- (Thailand) Natarid Thammarossopon
- (Vietnam) Hoàng Đình Tùng
- (Vietnam) Lâm Anh Quang
- (Vietnam) Lê Hoàng Thiên
- (Vietnam) Lê Văn Thắng

1 goal

- (Brunei) Najib Tarif
- (Brunei) Reduan Petara
- (Indonesia) Andik Vermansyah
- (Indonesia) Ferdinand Sinaga
- (Indonesia) Ramdani Lestaluhu
- (Laos) Keoviengphet Liththideth
- (Laos) Manolom Phomsouvanh
- (Laos) Paseuthsack Souliyavong
- (Laos) Sangvone Phimmasen
- (Malaysia) Fakri Saarani
- (Malaysia) Asraruddin Putra
- (Malaysia) Syahrul Azwari
- (Malaysia) Wan Zaharulnizam
- (Myanmar) Aye San
- (Myanmar) Kyi Lin
- (Myanmar) Mai Aih Naing
- (Myanmar) Pyae Phyo Oo
- (Myanmar) Yan Aung Win
- (Philippines) OJ Porteria
- (Singapore) Gabriel Quak
- (Singapore) Khairul Nizam
- (Singapore) Nigel Vanu
- (Singapore) Safirul Sulaiman
- (Thailand) Kroekrit Thaweekarn
- (Thailand) Ronnachai Rangsiyo
- (Timor-Leste) Diogo Rangel
- (Vietnam) Âu Văn Hoàn
- (Vietnam) Hoàng Văn Bình
- (Vietnam) Nguyễn Trọng Hoàng
- (Vietnam) Phạm Thành Lương

Own goal

- (Philippines) Matthew Hartmann (for Vietnam)
- (Vietnam) Hoàng Đình Tùng (for Myanmar)

== Final ranking ==
Pos	Team	Pld	W	D	L	GF	GA	GD	Pts	Final result
1	Malaysia	6	4	2	0	13	6	+7	14	Gold Medal
2	Indonesia (H)	6	4	1	1	17	7	+10	13	Silver Medal
3	Myanmar	7	5	1	1	17	3	+14	16	Bronze Medal
4	Vietnam	7	4	1	2	17	8	+9	13	Fourth place
5	Singapore	4	2	1	1	4	3	+1	7	Eliminated in group stage
6	Timor-Leste	5	2	0	3	4	8	−4	6	Eliminated in group stage
7	Laos	5	1	1	3	10	9	+1	4	Eliminated in group stage
8	Brunei	5	1	1	3	5	17	−12	4	Eliminated in group stage
9	Thailand	4	1	0	3	6	7	−1	3	Eliminated in group stage
10	Philippines	5	1	0	4	6	14	−8	3	Eliminated in group stage
11	Cambodia	4	0	0	4	2	16	−14	0	Eliminated in group stage

(H) Hosts

Preceded by 2009	Football at the SEA Games; 2011 SEA Games	Succeeded by 2013
