= Football at the 2009 SEA Games =

Tournament details
- Host country: Laos
- Dates: 2–17 December
- Teams: 9 (from 1 confederation)
- Venues: 2 (in 1 host city)

Final positions
- Champions: Malaysia (5th title)
- Runners-up: Vietnam
- Third place: Singapore
- Fourth place: Laos

Tournament statistics
- Matches played: 20
- Goals scored: 82 (4.1 per match)
- Top scorer: (Thailand) Sompong Soleb (6 goals)

The football tournament at the 2009 SEA Games was held in Vientiane, Laos. The men's tournament was played by under-23 national teams, while the women's tournament had no age limit.

== Venues ==
(Laos) Vientiane
New Laos National Stadium	Laos National Stadium	National University of Laos Stadium
Capacity: 25,000	Capacity: 20,000	Capacity: 5,000

== Medal winners ==
Division	Gold	Silver	Bronze
Men's Division	Malaysia	Vietnam	Singapore
Women's Division	Vietnam	Thailand	Myanmar

== Men's tournament ==
=== Participants ===
- Cambodia
- Indonesia
- Laos
- Malaysia
- Myanmar
- Singapore
- Thailand
- Timor-Leste
- Vietnam

All times are Indochina Time (UTC+7)

=== Group stage ===
==== Group A ====
Team	Pld	W	D	L	GF	GA	GD	Pts
Vietnam	4	3	1	0	14	3	+11	10
Malaysia	4	3	0	1	18	4	+14	9
Thailand	4	2	1	1	15	3	+12	7
Cambodia	4	1	0	3	5	15	−10	3
Timor-Leste	4	0	0	4	1	28	−27	0

2 December 2009
15:00

Malaysia	11–0	Timor-Leste
Norshahrul 3', 30'; Baddrol 12'; Zaquan 15'; Safiq 28'; Fakri 40', 70', 76'; Aidil 57'; Amirul 80'; Amar 90+2'	Report

New Laos National Stadium, Vientiane
2 December 2009
17:45

Thailand	1–1	Vietnam
Kirati 70'	Report	Hoàng Đình Tùng 89' (pen.)

New Laos National Stadium, Vientiane

4 December 2009
15:00

Thailand	4–0	Cambodia
Sompong 19', 45+3', 50'; Kirati 45+1'	Report

Laos National Stadium, Vientiane
4 December 2009
17:45

Vietnam	4–0	Timor-Leste
Mai Tiến Thành 54', 57', 68'; Phan Thanh Bình 62'	Report

Laos National Stadium, Vientiane

6 December 2009
15:00

Vietnam	3–1	Malaysia
Phan Thanh Bình 13'; Mai Tiến Thành 25'; Nguyễn Trọng Hoàng 45+3'	Report	Võ Hoàng Quảng 26' (o.g.)

New Laos National Stadium, Vientiane
6 December 2009
17:45

Timor-Leste	1–4	Cambodia
João Kik 88'	Report	Sokngon 19', 81'; Sokumpheak 33', 87'

New Laos National Stadium, Vientiane

8 December 2009
15:00

Timor-Leste	0–9	Thailand
	Report	Sompong 3', 32', 76'; Anawin 37', 86'; Kriangkrai 44'; Apipoo 45+1', 60'; Piyachart 49'

Laos National Stadium, Vientiane
8 December 2009
17:45

Cambodia	0–4	Malaysia
	Report	Manaf 36'; Norshahrul 77'; S. Kunalan 82'; Safiq 86'

Laos National Stadium, Vientiane

11 December 2009
15:00

Cambodia	1–6	Vietnam
Borey 68'	Report	Phạm Thành Lương 11', 62'; Phan Thanh Hưng 42'; Hoàng Đình Tùng 65', 83'; Trần Mạnh Dũng 89'

Laos National Stadium, Vientiane
11 December 2009
15:00 UTC+7

Malaysia	2–1	Thailand
Nasriq 81'; Fakri 90+2'	Report	Arthit 53'

New Laos National Stadium, Vientiane

==== Group B ====
Team	Pld	W	D	L	GF	GA	GD	Pts
Laos	3	1	2	0	3	1	+2	5
Singapore	3	1	2	0	4	3	+1	5
Myanmar	3	1	1	1	5	4	+1	4
Indonesia	3	0	1	2	3	7	−4	1

5 December 2009
15:00

Singapore	2–2	Indonesia
Safuwan 6'; Shaiful 24'	Report	Bonsapia 42'; Rendy 64'

New Laos National Stadium, Vientiane
5 December 2009
17:45

Laos	1–1	Myanmar
Sayavutthi 69'	Report	Kyaw Thiha 42'

New Laos National Stadium, Vientiane

7 December 2009
15:00

Myanmar	1–2	Singapore
Soe Min Oo 90'	Report	Safuwan 14'; Hariss 29'

Laos National Stadium, Vientiane
7 December 2009
17:45

Indonesia	0–2	Laos
	Report	Singto 66', 76'

Laos National Stadium, Vientiane

10 December 2009
15:00

Myanmar	3–1	Indonesia
Tun Tun Win 6'; Pai Soe 53'; Moe Win 81'	Report	Stevie 75'

New Laos National Stadium, Vientiane
10 December 2009
17:45

Laos	0–0	Singapore
	Report

New Laos National Stadium, Vientiane

=== Knockout stages ===
Semi-finals
14 December
Vietnam	4
Singapore	1
14 December
Laos	1
Malaysia	3

Final
17 December
Vietnam	0
Malaysia	1
Third place
17 December
Singapore	3
Laos	1

==== Semi-finals ====
14 December 2009
18:00

Vietnam	4–1	Singapore
Phan Thanh Bình 33'; Mai Tiến Thành 42'; Chu Ngọc Anh 68'; Nguyễn Ngọc Anh 90+4'		Afiq 28'

Laos National Stadium, Vientiane

14 December 2009
19:00

Laos	1–3	Malaysia
Sysomvang 74'		Baddrol 14', 78'; Safiq 85'

New Laos National Stadium, Vientiane

==== Bronze-medal match ====
17 December 2009
15:00

Singapore	3–1	Laos
Khairul 23'; Fazli 53'; Fadhil 87'		Singto 89'

Laos National Stadium, Vientiane

==== Gold-medal match ====
17 December 2009
17:00

Vietnam	0–1	Malaysia
		Mai Xuân Hợp 84' (o.g.)

New Laos National Stadium, Vientiane
Referee: Pratap Singh (India)

=== Winners ===
2009 SEA Games Men's Tournament
(Malaysia)
Malaysia
Fifth title

=== Goalscorers ===
6 goals

- (Thailand) Sompong Soleb

5 goals

- (Vietnam) Mai Tiến Thành

4 goals

- (Malaysia) Ahmad Fakri Saarani

3 goals

- (Laos) Lamnao Singto
- (Malaysia) Baddrol Bakhtiar
- (Malaysia) Mohd Safiq Rahim
- (Malaysia) Norshahrul Idlan Talaha
- (Vietnam) Hoàng Đình Tùng
- (Vietnam) Phan Thanh Bình

2 goals

- (Cambodia) Keo Sokngon
- (Cambodia) Kouch Sokumpheak
- (Indonesia) Stevie Bonsapia
- (Singapore) Safuwan Baharudin
- (Thailand) Anawin Jujeen
- (Thailand) Apipoo Suntornpanavej
- (Thailand) Keerati Keawsombat
- (Vietnam) Phạm Thành Lương

1 goal

- (Cambodia) Khim Borey
- (Indonesia) Rendy Siregar
- (Laos) Kanlaya Sysomvang
- (Laos) Khampheng Sayavutthi
- (Malaysia) Abdul Manaf Mamat
- (Malaysia) Mohd Aidil Zafuan Abdul Radzak
- (Malaysia) Mohd Amar Rohidan
- (Malaysia) Mohd Amirul Hadi Zainal
- (Malaysia) Mohd Nasriq Baharom
- (Malaysia) Mohd Zaquan Adha Abdul Radzak
- (Malaysia) S. Kunalan
- (Myanmar) Kyaw Thiha
- (Myanmar) Moe Win
- (Myanmar) Pai Soe
- (Myanmar) Soe Min Oo
- (Myanmar) Tun Tun Win
- (Singapore) Fadhil Noh
- (Singapore) Fazli Ayob
- (Singapore) Hariss Harun
- (Singapore) Khairul Nizam
- (Singapore) Afiq Yunos
- (Singapore) Shaiful Esah
- (Thailand) Arthit Sunthornphit
- (Thailand) Piyachart Tamaphan
- (Thailand) Kriangkrai Pimrat
- (Timor-Leste) João Kik
- (Vietnam) Chu Ngọc Anh
- (Vietnam) Nguyễn Ngọc Anh
- (Vietnam) Nguyễn Trọng Hoàng
- (Vietnam) Phan Thanh Hưng
- (Vietnam) Trần Mạnh Dũng

Own goal

- (Vietnam) Mai Xuân Hợp (For Malaysia)
- (Vietnam) Võ Hoàng Quảng (For Malaysia)

=== Final ranking ===
Pos	Team	Pld	W	D	L	GF	GA	GD	Pts	Final result
1	Malaysia	6	5	0	1	22	5	+17	15	Gold Medal
2	Vietnam	6	4	1	1	18	5	+13	13	Silver Medal
3	Singapore	5	2	2	1	8	8	0	8	Bronze Medal
4	Laos (H)	5	1	2	2	5	7	−2	5	Fourth place
5	Thailand	4	2	1	1	15	3	+12	7	Eliminated in group stage
6	Myanmar	3	1	1	1	5	4	+1	4	Eliminated in group stage
7	Cambodia	4	1	0	3	5	15	−10	3	Eliminated in group stage
8	Indonesia	3	0	1	2	3	7	−4	1	Eliminated in group stage
9	Timor-Leste	4	0	0	4	1	28	−27	0	Eliminated in group stage

(H) Hosts

== Women's tournament ==
Football at the 2009 SEA Games
Tournament details
- Host country: Laos
- Dates: 4–16 December
- Teams: 6 (from 1 confederation)
- Venues: 2 (in 1 host city)

Final positions
- Champions: Vietnam (5th title)
- Runners-up: Thailand
- Third place: Myanmar
- Fourth place: Laos

Tournament statistics
- Matches played: 11
- Goals scored: 55 (5 per match)
- Top scorer(s): Four players (4 goals each)

=== Participants ===
- Laos
- Malaysia
- Myanmar
- Thailand
- Vietnam

=== Group stage ===
Team	Pld	W	D	L	GF	GA	GD	Pts
Thailand	4	2	2	0	22	5	+17	8
Vietnam	4	2	2	0	14	3	+11	8
Myanmar	4	1	3	0	11	5	+6	6
Laos	4	1	1	2	7	8	−1	4
Malaysia	4	0	0	4	1	34	−33	0

4 December 2009
13:30 UTC+7

Malaysia	0–14	Thailand
	Report	Supaporn 15', 34', 70'; Nisa 18', 42'; Thanatta 21'; Pitsamai 28', 56', 85'; Naphat 33'; Kanjana 39'; Kwanruethai 51'; Sunisa 77'; Orathai 81'

National University of Laos Stadium, Vientiane
4 December 2009
15:45 UTC+7

Laos	1–1	Myanmar
Souphavanh Phayvanh 33'	Report	My Nilar Htwe 35'

National University of Laos Stadium, Vientiane

6 December 2009
13:30 UTC+7

Thailand	2–2	Myanmar
Supaporn 61'; Sunisa 90+6'	Report	Khin Marlar Tun 17', 80'

National University of Laos Stadium, Vientiane
6 December 2009
15:45 UTC+7

Malaysia	0–8	Vietnam
	Report	Đoàn Thị Kim Chi 17', 85'; Nguyễn Thị Muôn 21', 68'; Trần Thị Kim Hồng 29'; Nguyễn Thị Minh Nguyệt 51', 63'; Văn Thị Thanh 73'

National University of Laos Stadium, Vientiane

8 December 2009
13:30 UTC+7

Myanmar	1–1	Vietnam
Moe Moe War 76'	Report	Đoàn Thị Kim Chi 55'

National University of Laos Stadium, Vientiane
8 December 2009
15:45 UTC+7

Thailand	4–1	Laos
Pitsamai 6'; Orathai 28'; Naphat 32'; Sukunya 89'	Report	Phayvanh 13'

National University of Laos Stadium, Vientiane

11 December 2009
13:30 UTC+7

Laos	5–0	Malaysia
Phayvanh 47', 74'; Phonhalath 60', 68'; Sihanouvong 83'	Report

National University of Laos Stadium, Vientiane
11 December 2009
15:45 UTC+7

Vietnam	2–2	Thailand
Nguyễn Thị Muôn 4'; Văn Thị Thanh 32'	Report	Nguyễn Thị Ngọc Anh 41' (o.g.); Sukunya 88'

National University of Laos Stadium, Vientiane

13 December 2009
15:45 UTC+7

Vietnam	3–0	Laos
Trần Thị Kim Hồng 14', 73'; Đoàn Thị Kim Chi 82'	Report

Chao Anouvong Stadium, Vientiane
13 December 2009
18:00 UTC+7

Myanmar	7–1	Malaysia
Khin Marlar Tun 19'; Moe Moe War 25'; Aye Nandar Hlang 33'; Thu Zar Htwe 35'; My Nilar Htwe 65'; Margret Marri 81'; Khin Moe Wai 88'	Report	Norhanisa Yasa 44'

Chao Anouvong Stadium, Vientiane

=== Final ===
16 December 2009
16:00

Thailand	0–0 (a.e.t.)	Vietnam
	Report
Penalties
Supaporn (penalty missed); Naphat (penalty missed); Nisa (penalty missed)	0–3	(penalty scored) Trần Thị Kim Hồng; (penalty scored) Văn Thị Thanh; (penalty scored) Nguyễn Thị Kim Tiến

Laos National Stadium, Vientiane

=== Winners ===
2009 SEA Games Women's Tournament

Vietnam
Fourth title

=== Goalscorers ===
4 goals

- (Laos) Souphavanh Phayvanh
- (Thailand) Pitsamai Sornsai
- (Thailand) Supaporn Gaewbaen
- (Vietnam) Đoàn Thị Kim Chi

3 goals

- (Myanmar) Khin Marlar Tun
- (Vietnam) Nguyễn Thị Muôn
- (Vietnam) Trần Thị Kim Hồng

2 goals

- (Laos) Sochitta Phonhalath
- (Myanmar) Moe Moe War
- (Myanmar) My Nilar Htwe
- (Thailand) Naphat Seesraum
- (Thailand) Nisa Romyen
- (Thailand) Orathai Srimanee
- (Thailand) Sunisa Srangthaisong
- (Thailand) Sukunya Peangthem
- (Vietnam) Nguyễn Thị Minh Nguyệt
- (Vietnam) Văn Thị Thanh

1 goals

- (Laos) Khouanhta Sihanouvong
- (Malaysia) Norhanisa Yasa
- (Myanmar) Aye Nandar Hlang
- (Myanmar) Khin Moe Wai
- (Myanmar) Margret Marri
- (Myanmar) Thu Zar Htwe
- (Thailand) Thanatta Chawong
- (Thailand) Kanjana Sungngoen
- (Thailand) Kwanruethai Kunupatham

Own goal

- (Vietnam) Nguyễn Thị Ngọc Anh (For Thailand)

=== Final ranking ===
Pos	Team	Pld	W	D	L	GF	GA	GD	Pts	Final Result
1	Vietnam	5	2	3	0	14	3	+11	9	Gold Medal
2	Thailand	5	2	3	0	22	5	+17	9	Silver Medal
3	Myanmar	4	1	3	0	11	5	+6	6	Bronze Medal
4	Laos (H)	4	1	1	2	7	8	−1	4	
5	Malaysia	4	0	0	4	1	34	−33	0	

(H) Hosts

Preceded by 2007	Football at the SEA Games; 2009 SEA Games	Succeeded by 2011
