= 2016 Zayar Shwe Myay F.C. season =

Zeyar Shwe Myay
2016 season
- Owner: U Thu Rain
- Manager: (Portugal) Fabiano Jose Flora
- Stadium: Monywa Stadium

== Season Review ==
Period	Sportswear	Sponsor
2016	(Germany) Adidas	

== Coaching staff ==
Position	Staff
Coach	(Portugal) Fabiano Jose Flora
Assistant coach	(Myanmar) U Myo Tun
Technical manager	(Myanmar) U Nyam Win
Goalkeeper coach	(Myanmar) U Myo Chit
Manager	(Myanmar) U Soe Moe

Source: Zeya Shwe Myay FC

=== Other information ===
Owner	(Myanmar) U Thu Rain
General Manager	(Myanmar) U Zaw Min Aung
Ground (capacity and dimensions)	Monywa Stadium (5,000 / 103x67 metres)
Training Ground	Monywa Stadium

== Squad(2016) ==
Note: Flags indicate national team as defined under FIFA eligibility rules; some limited exceptions apply. Players may hold more than one non-FIFA nationality.

No.	Pos.	Nation	Player
1	GK	(Myanmar) MYA	Zaw Zaw Naing
3	DF	(Myanmar) MYA	Shwe Hlaing Win
4	DF	(Myanmar) MYA	Aung Hein Soe Oo
5	DF	(Myanmar) MYA	Phyo Paing Soe
6	MF	(Myanmar) MYA	Aung Ko Ko Win
7	MF	(Myanmar) MYA	Nan Min Aung
8	MF	(Myanmar) MYA	Zaw Lin Htet
9	FW	(Myanmar) MYA	Naing Oo Lwin
10	FW	(Costa Rica) CRC	Victor (Captain)
11	FW	(Brazil) BRA	Marcio Gomes
12	GK	(Myanmar) MYA	Phyo Min Maung
15	MF	(Myanmar) MYA	Myo Min Zaw
16	DF	(Myanmar) MYA	Wai Phyo Lwin

No.	Pos.	Nation	Player
17	DF	(Myanmar) MYA	Yan Aung Win
18	GK	(Myanmar) MYA	Aung Kyaw Kyaw
19	MF	(Myanmar) MYA	Aung Thu Phyo
20	FW	(Myanmar) MYA	Ye' Htet Aung
23	FW	(Myanmar) MYA	Kaung Sithu
24	MF	(Myanmar) MYA	Myo Wai Lin
27	DF	(Indonesia) IDN	Dedi Gusmawan
29	DF	(Myanmar) MYA	Win Zin Oo
31	MF	(Myanmar) MYA	Naing Soe Wai
34	DF	(Myanmar) MYA	Nay Myo Aung
44	DF	(Nigeria) NGA	Ibrahim

== Transfers ==
In: Note: Flags indicate national team as defined under FIFA eligibility rules; some limited exceptions apply. Players may hold more than one non-FIFA nationality.

No.	Pos.	Nation	Player
—	FW	(Myanmar) MYA	Pyi Moe (from Rakhine United FC)
—	DF	(Myanmar) MYA	Pyaw Phyo Ko Ko (from Rakhine United FC)
—	MF	(Myanmar) MYA	Wai Phyo Lwin (from Rakhine United FC)

Out: Note: Flags indicate national team as defined under FIFA eligibility rules; some limited exceptions apply. Players may hold more than one non-FIFA nationality.

No.	Pos.	Nation	Player
—	DF	(Myanmar) MYA	Aung Hein Kyaw (to Contract end)
—	GK	(Myanmar) MYA	Tun Lin Soe (to Contract end)
