= Mahadirga Lasut =

Indonesian footballer

Personal information
- Full name: Mahadirga Maranando Lasut
- Date of birth: 17 August 1988 (age 38)
- Place of birth: Tomohon, Indonesia
- Height: 1.73 m (5 ft 8 in)
- Position: Midfielder

Youth career
- 2000–2004: Tomohon Junior Manado

Senior career*
Years	Team	Apps	(Gls)
2006–2007	PSKT Tomohon	7	(0)
2007–2008	Persmin Minahasa	2	(0)
2008–2009	Persiraja Banda Aceh	19	(0)
2009–2010	Persih Tembilahan	11	(0)
2010–2011	Sriwijaya	22	(0)
2011–2012	Mitra Kukar	21	(0)
2012–2013	Gresik United	8	(0)
2013–2014	Persita Tangerang	16	(0)
2015	Persija Jakarta	0	(0)
2016–2017	PSS Sleman	39	(14)
2018–2019	Borneo	31	(0)
2020–2024	Sulut United	27	(0)
2024–2025	PSGC Ciamis	12	(1)
2025–2026	Pesik Kuningan	15	(0)

International career
2009–2011	Indonesia U23	7	(0)
Medal record
Men's football
Representing Indonesia
Southeast Asian Games
Silver medal – second place	2011 Jakarta-Palembang	Team
- * Club domestic league appearances and goals as of 23:25, 27 February 2025 (UTC)

Mahadirga Maranando "Dirga" Lasut (born 17 August 1988, in Tomohon, Sulawesi Utara) is an Indonesian professional footballer who plys as a midfielder.

== Club career ==
=== Borneo ===
In 2018, Dirga signed a contract with Indonesian Liga 1 club Borneo. He made his league debut on 25 March 2018 in a match against Sriwijaya at the Segiri Stadium, Samarinda.

=== Sulut United ===
He was signed for Sulut United to play in Liga 2 in the 2020 season. This season was suspended on 27 March 2020 due to the COVID-19 pandemic. The season was abandoned and was declared void on 20 January 2021.

== International career ==
In 2011, Mahadirga represented the Indonesia U-23, in the 2011 Southeast Asian Games.

== Honours ==
Sriwijaya

- Indonesian Community Shield: 2010
- Indonesian Inter Island Cup: 2010

Pesik Kuningan

- Liga 4 runner up: 2025–26

Indonesia U-23

- SEA Games silver medal: 2011
