= Emerson Cesario =

Brazilian-born East Timorese footballer (born 1990)

Émerson Cesário
Personal information
- Full name: Émerson Carlos Cesário
- Date of birth: 16 February 1990 (age 36)
- Place of birth: Campo Mourão, Brazil
- Height: 1.98 m (6 ft 6 in)
- Position: Goalkeeper

Youth career
- 2004–2010: Corinthians Juventude

Senior career*
Years	Team	Apps	(Gls)
2011	Mirassol FC		
2012	Goiânia EC		
2012	Chiangrai United	2	(0)
2014–2015	Itaboraí		
2016	CD Lam Ieng		

International career
2011	Timor-Leste U-23	6	(0)
2012	Timor-Leste	4	(0)
- * Club domestic league appearances and goals

Émerson Carlos Cesário, also known as Émerson (born 16 February 1990) is a football player.

== International career ==
Émerson was born at Campo Mourão, Brazil, and is the current main goalkeeper for the Timor-Leste national football team, after having been naturalized in the Portuguese-speaking Southeast Asian country, together with other Brazilian players. He made his senior international debut against Cambodia in the 2012 AFF Suzuki Cup qualification on 5 October 2012.

Émerson played his best at third match of 2011 SEA Games against Vietnam event-though his team loss.
