= Patrich Wanggai =

Indonesian footballer (born 1988)

Personal information
- Full name: Patrich Steev Wanggai
- Date of birth: 27 June 1988 (age 38)
- Place of birth: Nabire, Indonesia
- Height: 1.77 m (5 ft 10 in)
- Position: Forward

Youth career
- 2003: PS Hasrat Abadi Nabire
- 2004: Sumber Mas FC Nabire
- 2005–2006: PS UNIPA Manokwari

Senior career*
Years	Team	Apps	(Gls)
2007–2008	Persewon Wondama	26	(14)
2008–2009	Perseman Manokwari	5	(2)
2009–2012	Persidafon Dafonsoro	67	(41)
2012–2014	Persipura Jayapura	26	(12)
2014	T-Team	31	(8)
2015	Sriwijaya	3	(0)
2016	Karketu Dili	24	(10)
2016	Madura United	11	(4)
2017	Borneo	24	(1)
2018	Sriwijaya	10	(2)
2018	Persib Bandung	13	(4)
2019	Kalteng Putra	27	(7)
2020	Persebaya Surabaya	2	(0)
2021	PSM Makassar	0	(0)
2021	RANS Cilegon	5	(0)
2021	Sulut United	5	(2)
2022–2023	Persipura Jayapura	4	(0)
2023–2024	Deltras	8	(1)
2024–2025	Persekabpas Pasuruan	9	(1)

International career
2011	Indonesia U23	17	(8)
2012	Indonesia	1	(1)
Medal record
Men's football
Representing Indonesia
Southeast Asian Games
Silver medal – second place	2011 Jakarta-Palembang	Team
- * Club domestic league appearances and goals as of 21:17, 21 February 2025 (UTC)

Patrich Steev Wanggai (born 27 June 1988 in Nabire) is an Indonesian professional footballer who plays as a forward.

== Personal life ==
His older brother Izaac Wanggai and his cousin Imanuel Wanggai are also footballers.

== Club career ==
He start his football career with Persewon Wondama and Perseman Manokwari. He started his professional career with Persidafon Dafonsoro along with his older brother Izaac Wanggai before he move to Persipura Jayapura.

=== Sriwijaya ===
In November 2014, he signed with Indonesia Super League club Sriwijaya. Wanggai made his league debut on 4 April 2015 in a match against Pelita Bandung Raya at the Gelora Sriwijaya Stadium, Palembang.

=== Karketu Dili ===
In early 2016 while the Indonesian league was suspended Wanggai joined Karketu Dili in the Liga Futebol Amadora in Timor-Leste. He became league top scorer with 10 goals in 2016 seasons and bring the club finished as runner-up that season.

=== Madura United ===
In August 2016 Wanggai signed with Madura United.

=== Borneo ===
In 2017, Wanggai signed a year contract with Liga 1 club Borneo. He made his league debut on 13 August 2017 in a match against PS TNI. On 8 November 2017, Wanggai scored his first goal for Borneo against Persib Bandung in the 45th minute at the Mulawarman Stadium, Bontang.

=== Sriwijaya ===
In January 2018 Wanggai returned and signed with Sriwijaya for the 2018 Liga 1. He made his league debut on 25 March 2018 in a match against Borneo. On 12 May 2018, Wanggai scored his first goal for Sriwijaya against Bhayangkara in the 86th minute at the Gelora Sriwijaya Stadium, Palembang. He made 10 league appearances and scored two goals for Sriwijaya, before being released on a free transfer during the mid-season transfer window.

=== Persib Bandung ===
After being released by Sriwijaya, Persib Bandung immediately signed Wanggai on a free transfer during the mid-season transfer window. He made his league debut on 22 July 2018 in a match against Barito Putera. On 30 July 2018, Wanggai scored his first goal for Persib against PS TIRA in the 45th minute at the Sultan Agung Stadium, Bantul.

=== Kalteng Putra ===
In 2019 Wanggai signed with Kalteng Putra for the 2019 Liga 1. Wanggai made his debut on 16 May 2019 in a match against PSIS Semarang. On 26 July 2019, Wanggai scored his first goal for Kalteng Putra against TIRA-Persikabo in the 88th minute at the Pakansari Stadium, Bogor. He made 27 league appearances and scored seven goals for Kalteng Putra.

=== Persebaya Surabaya ===
He was signed for Persebaya Surabaya to play in Liga 1 in the 2020 season. Wanggai made his debut on 29 February 2020 in a match against Persik Kediri at the Gelora Bung Tomo Stadium, Surabaya. This season was suspended on 27 March 2020 due to the COVID-19 pandemic. The season was abandoned and was declared void on 20 January 2021.

=== PSM Makassar ===
In 2021, Wanggai joined in the PSM Makassar squad for 2021 Menpora Cup. He made his debut with PSM Makassar against Persija Jakarta.

=== RANS Cilegon ===
In 2021, Wanggai signed a contract with Indonesian Liga 2 club RANS Cilegon. He made his league debut on 28 September against Dewa United at the Gelora Bung Karno Madya Stadium, Jakarta. He only made five appearances with the club.

=== Sulut United ===
On 5 November 2021, Wanggai moved to North Sulawesi and joined Liga 2 side Sulut United, along with Rendy Juliansyah, on a free transfer. He made his debut on 10 November 2021 in a match against Mitra Kukar. Wanggai scored his first goal in the 74th minute at the Batakan Stadium, Balikpapan.

== International career ==
Patrich Wanggai received and scored his first senior international cap against Philippines on 5 June 2012.

== International goals ==
Patrich Wanggai: International under-23 goals
Goal	Date	Venue	Opponent	Score	Result	Competition
1	15 September 2011	Kowloon Bay Park, Kowloon, Hong Kong	Hong Kong U-23	0–1	0–4	Friendly
2	15 September 2011	Kowloon Bay Park, Kowloon, Hong Kong	Hong Kong U-23	0–4	0–4	Friendly
3	25 October 2011	Gelora Bung Karno Stadium, Jakarta, Indonesia	Timor-Leste U-23	3–0	5–0	Friendly
4	7 November 2011	Gelora Bung Karno Stadium, Jakarta, Indonesia	Cambodia U-23	2–0	6–0	2011 Southeast Asian Games
5	7 November 2011	Gelora Bung Karno Stadium, Jakarta, Indonesia	Cambodia U-23	4–0	6–0	2011 Southeast Asian Games
6	11 November 2011	Gelora Bung Karno Stadium, Jakarta, Indonesia	Singapore U-23	1–0	2–0	2011 Southeast Asian Games
7	13 November 2011	Gelora Bung Karno Stadium, Jakarta, Indonesia	Thailand U-23	2–1	3–1	2011 Southeast Asian Games
8	19 November 2011	Gelora Bung Karno Stadium, Jakarta, Indonesia	Vietnam U-23	0–1	0–2	2011 Southeast Asian Games

Patrich Wanggai: International goals
No.	Date	Venue	Opponent	Score	Result	Competition
1	5 June 2012	Rizal Memorial Stadium, Manila, Philippines	Philippines	1–0	2–2	Friendly

== Honours ==
Persipura Jayapura

- Indonesia Super League: 2013

Pusamania Borneo

- Indonesia President's Cup runner-up: 2017

Sriwijaya

- East Kalimantan Governor Cup: 2018

Persebaya Surabaya

- East Java Governor Cup: 2020

Indonesia U-23

- SEA Games silver medal: 2011

Individual

- Liga Futebol Amadora Top Goalscorer: 2016 (10 goals)
