= Egi Melgiansyah =

Indonesian footballer

Personal information
- Full name: Egi Melgiansyah
- Date of birth: 4 September 1990 (age 36)
- Place of birth: Bogor, Indonesia
- Height: 1.67 m (5 ft 6 in)
- Position: Midfielder

Youth career
- 2001−2003: SSB Pelita Bakrie
- 2004: Pelita Jaya
- 2004: ASIOP Apacinti
- 2005−2006: Persita Tangerang

Senior career*
| Years | Team | Apps | (Gls) |
| 2007−2012 | Pelita Jaya | 111 | (4) |
| 2012−2013 | Arema Cronus | 26 | (0) |
| 2013−2014 | Persija Jakarta | 13 | (0) |
| 2015 | Borneo | 0 | (0) |
| 2016–2021 | Persita Tangerang | 82 | (5) |
| 2021–2023 | Perserang Serang | 16 | (0) |
| 2023–2024 | Adhyaksa Farmel | 6 | (0) |
| Total | | 254 | (9) |

International career
| 2003−2005 | Indonesia U17 | 4 | (3) |
| 2007−2008 | Indonesia U19 | 3 | (3) |
| 2008 | Indonesia U21 | 4 | (0) |
| 2009−2013 | Indonesia U23 | 21 | (1) |

Managerial career
- 2025–: Slawi United
Medal record
Men's football
Representing Indonesia
Southeast Asian Games
| Silver medal – second place | 2011 Jakarta-Palembang | Team |
| Silver medal – second place | 2013 Naypyidaw | Team |
- * Club domestic league appearances and goals

Egi Melgiansyah (born 4 September 1990) is an Indonesian professional football coach and former player who is currently the head coach of Slawi United.

== Club career ==
On 6 December 2014, he signed with Pusamania Borneo.

== International goals ==
=== U–19 ===
| Goal | Date | Venue | Opponent | Score | Result | Competition |
|---|---|---|---|---|---|---|
| 1. | 12 November 2007 | Thanh Long Sports Centre, Ho Chi Minh City, Vietnam | Guam | 0–2 | 0–12 | 2008 AFC Youth Championship qualification |
| 2. | 12 November 2007 | Thanh Long Sports Centre, Ho Chi Minh City, Vietnam | Guam | 0–4 | 0–12 | 2008 AFC Youth Championship qualification |
| 3. | 12 November 2007 | Thanh Long Sports Centre, Ho Chi Minh City, Vietnam | Guam | 0–12 | 0–12 | 2008 AFC Youth Championship qualification |

=== U–23 ===
| Goal | Date | Venue | Opponent | Score | Result | Competition |
|---|---|---|---|---|---|---|
| 1 | 25 October 2011 | Gelora Bung Karno Stadium, Jakarta, Indonesia | Timor-Leste U-23 | 4–0 | 5–0 | Friendly |

== Honours ==
Arema Cronus

- Menpora Cup: 2013

Persita Tangerang

- Liga 2 runner-up: 2019

Adhyaksa Farmel

- Liga 3: 2023–24

Indonesia U-23

- SEA Games silver medal: 2011, 2013
