= Fahad Al-Kassar =

Football referee

- Full name: Fahad Abdalla Ahmad Al Kassar Banihammad
- Born: 1973 (age 52–53); United Arab Emirates

International
| Years | League | Role |
| 2011- | FIFA | Referee |

Fahad Abdalla Ahmad Al Kassar Banihammad (Arabic: فهد عبد الله احمد الكسار بني حماد; born 1973) is an Emirati football referee who has been a full international referee for FIFA.

Al-Kassar became a FIFA referee in 2011 and also refereed at the regional league, such as the 2011 SEA Games.
