= Yongki Aribowo =

Indonesian footballer

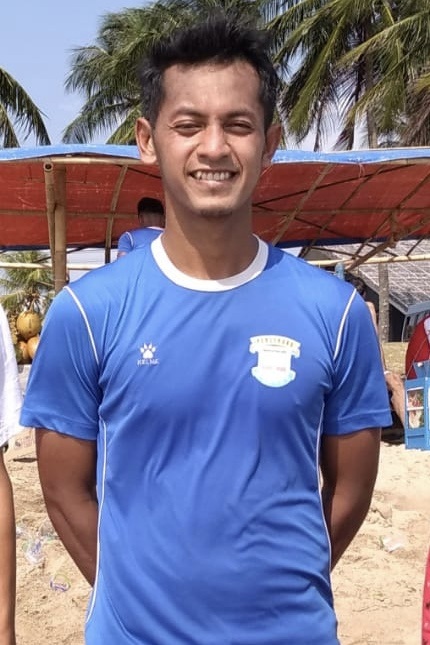
- Yongki with Perserang Serang in 2018

Personal information
- Full name: Yongki Aribowo
- Date of birth: 23 November 1989 (age 36)
- Place of birth: Tulungagung, Indonesia
- Height: 1.75 m (5 ft 9 in)
- Position: Forward

Youth career
- 2004–2006: SSB Sinar Jaya
- 2006–2007: Perseta Tulungagung
- 2007–2008: PSBI Blitar
- 2008–2009: Persik Kediri

Senior career*
Years	Team	Apps	(Gls)
2009–2010	Persik Kediri	24	(7)
2010–2011	Arema Indonesia	17	(7)
2011–2013	Putra Samarinda	30	(4)
2013–2014	Barito Putera	48	(8)
2015	Pelita Bandung Raya	2	(0)
2016–2017	Barito Putera	29	(3)
2018	Aceh United	7	(0)
2018	Perserang Serang	7	(0)
2019	Sriwijaya	22	(6)
2020	Badak Lampung	1	(0)
2021	Persiba Balikpapan	10	(0)
2022–2023	PSKC Cimahi	6	(0)
2023	Serpong City	4	(1)
Total		207	(36)

International career
2009–2011	Indonesia U23	15	(2)
2010–2011	Indonesia	7	(2)
Medal record
Men's football
Representing Indonesia
Southeast Asian Games
Silver medal – second place	2011 Jakarta-Palembang	Team
AFF Championship
Runner-up	2010 Indonesia & Vietnam	Team
- * Club domestic league appearances and goals

Yongki Aribowo (born 23 November 1989) is an Indonesian former footballer who plays as a forward. He was a member of the Indonesia national football team in AFF Suzuki Cup 2010.

== Club career ==
Yongki, who is usually called Bowo, started off his football career in SSB Sinar Jaya Tulungagung. He later continued his youth career to Perseta Tulungagung Junior. However, in Perseta Junior, he often sat on bench. Yongki plays as a striker. As a striker, he would play aggressively. His skill made Persik Kediri become interested in him and recruited him as a player in Persik Junior.

He had been linked with Wellington Phoenix and Melbourne Victory during 2010 summer transfer window.

On 23 February 2018, he joined the newly promoted club Aceh United to play in Liga 2.

== International career ==
In 2009, Yongki played to represent the Indonesia national football team, in 2009 SEA Games. In October 2010, Yongki was called up into senior national team and making his debut as a substitute player in a friendly match against Uruguay.

== International goals ==
Yongki Aribowo: International under-23 goals

Goal	Date	Venue	Opponent	Score	Result	Competition
1	9 February 2011	Pho Kong Village Park Stadium, Hong Kong	Hong Kong U-23	0–1	1–4	Friendly
2	15 September 2011	Kowloon Bay Park, Kowloon, Hong Kong	Hong Kong U-23	0–2	0–4	Friendly

Yongki Aribowo: International goals
No.	Date	Venue	Opponent	Score	Result	Competition
1	12 October 2010	Siliwangi Stadium, Bandung, Indonesia	Maldives	2–0	3–0	Friendly
2	21 November 2010	Gelora Sriwijaya Stadium, Palembang, Indonesia	Timor-Leste	6–0	6–0	Friendly

== Honours ==
=== International ===
Indonesia U-23

- SEA Games silver medal: 2011

Indonesia

- AFF Championship runner-up: 2010
