= Yericho Christiantoko =

Indonesian association footballer

Personal information
- Full name: Yericho Christiantoko
- Date of birth: 14 January 1992 (age 34)
- Place of birth: Malang, Indonesia
- Height: 1.67 m (5 ft 6 in)
- Position: Left back

Youth career
- 2008−2010: Deportivo Indonesia

Senior career*
Years	Team	Apps	(Gls)
2011−2012	Visé	6	(0)
2013	Arema Cronus	1	(0)
2014	Persekam Metro	0	(0)
2017−2019	Borneo	0	(0)
2017	→ 757 Kepri Jaya (loan)	12	(0)
2017	→ Kalteng Putra (loan)	3	(0)
2018	→ PSS Sleman (loan)	8	(0)
2018	→ Kalteng Putra (loan)	9	(0)
2019	Sriwijaya	20	(1)
2020	Persijap Jepara	1	(0)
2021−2022	Persekat Tegal	15	(0)
2022	→ Persiraja Banda Aceh (loan)	2	(0)
2023–2024	PSKC Cimahi	7	(0)
2024–2025	RANS Nusantara	4	(0)
2026–	Persikoba Batu	0	(0)

International career
2007−2008	Indonesia U16	8	(2)
2009	Indonesia U19	4	(0)
2011	Indonesia U23	2	(0)
Medal record
Men's football
Representing Indonesia
Southeast Asian Games
Silver medal – second place	2011 Jakarta-Palembang	Team
- * Club domestic league appearances and goals as of 9 February 2025

Yericho Christiantoko (born 14 January 1992 in Malang, East Java, Indonesia) is an Indonesian professional footballer who plays as a left back for Liga 4 club Persikoba Batu.

== Club career ==
=== Persijap Jepara ===
He was signed for Persijap Jepara to play in Liga 2 in the 2020 season. This season was suspended on 27 March 2020 due to the COVID-19 pandemic. The season was abandoned and was declared void on 20 January 2021.

=== Persekat Tegal ===
In 2021, Christiantoko signed a contract with Indonesian Liga 2 club Persekat Tegal. He made his league debut on 27 September in a 3–1 win against Badak Lampung at the Gelora Bung Karno Madya Stadium, Jakarta.

=== Persiraja Banda Aceh ===
He was signed for Persiraja Banda Aceh to play in the Liga 1 in the 2021 season. Yericho made his league debut on 8 January 2022 in a match against PSS Sleman at the Ngurah Rai Stadium, Denpasar.

== International career ==
In 2007, Christiantoko represented the Indonesia U-16, in the 2008 AFC U-16 Championship qualification.

== Honours ==
Arema Cronus

- Menpora Cup: 2013

Indonesia U23

- SEA Games silver medal: 2011
