= Hasyim Kipuw =

Indonesian footballer

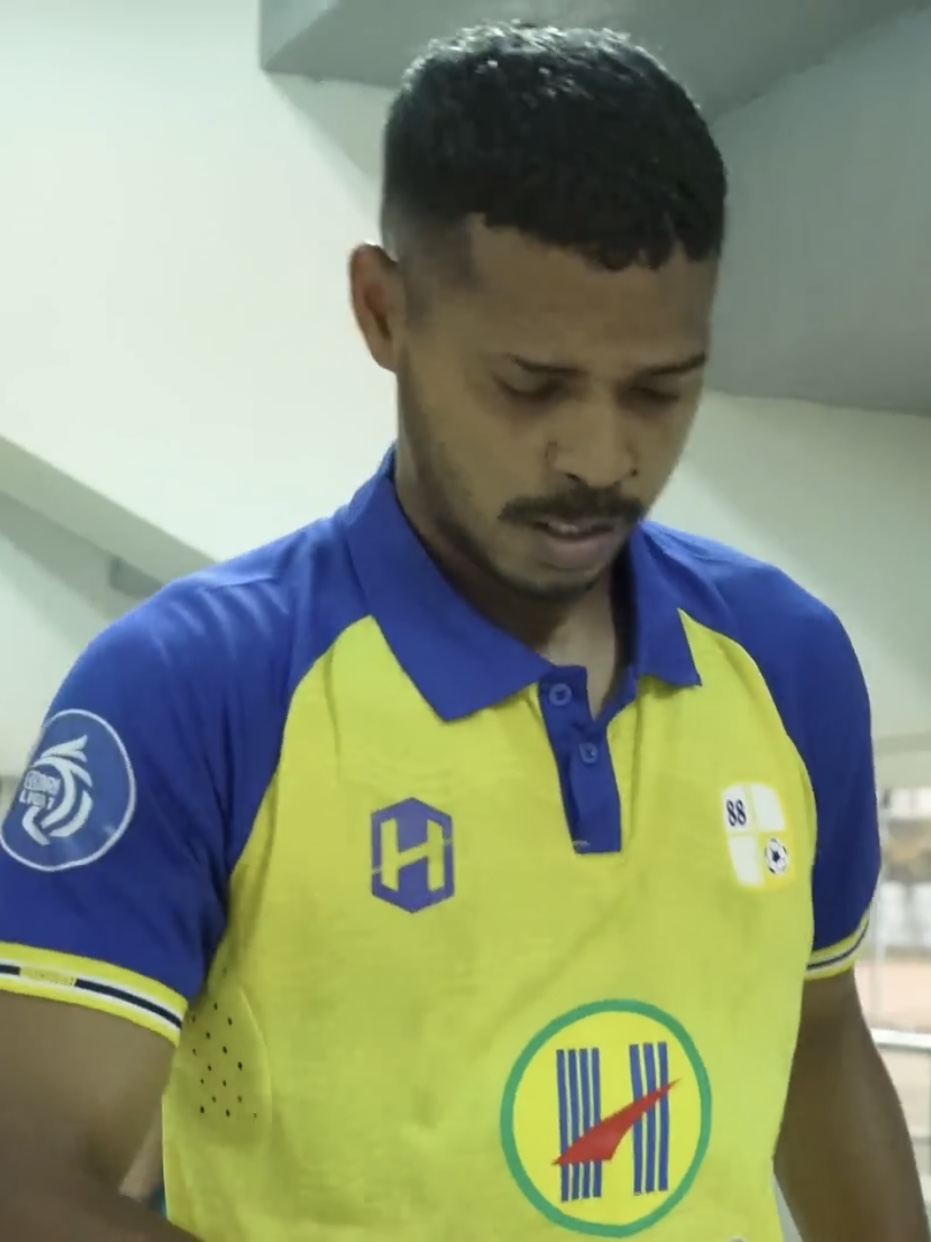
- Kipuw playing for Barito Putera in 2023

Personal information
- Full name: Hasyim Kipuw
- Date of birth: 9 May 1988 (age 38)
- Place of birth: Tulehu, Indonesia
- Height: 1.80 m (5 ft 11 in)
- Position: Defender

Team information
- Current team: Persis Solo
- Number: 15

Youth career
- 2003–2005: PPLP Maluku
- 2005–2006: SSB Remaja
- 2006–2007: SSB UKI
- 2007–2009: Persija Jakarta

Senior career*
Years	Team	Apps	(Gls)
2009–2012	Persija Jakarta	30	(0)
2012–2013	Arema Cronus	28	(1)
2013–2014	Bhayangkara F.C.	26	(0)
2014–2015	Arema Cronus	2	(0)
2016–2017	Bali United	46	(0)
2018–2022	PSM Makassar	62	(0)
2022–2023	Arema	5	(0)
2023	Madura United	11	(0)
2023–2024	Barito Putera	29	(1)
2024–2025	Persela Lamongan	21	(1)
2026	Adhyaksa	10	(0)
2026–	Persis Solo	3	(0)

International career
2011	Indonesia U23	6	(0)
2013–2015	Indonesia	7	(0)
Medal record
Men's football
Representing Indonesia
Southeast Asian Games
Silver medal – second place	2011 Jakarta-Palembang	Team
- * Club domestic league appearances and goals as of 11 October 2026

Hasyim Kipuw (born 9 May 1988) is an Indonesian professional footballer who plays for Persis Solo. Although primarily a centre-back, he has also been used as a right-back or defensive midfielder.

== Club career ==
=== Arema Cronus ===
On 2 December 2014, he signed with Arema Cronus.

=== Return to Arema ===
On 11 April 2022, Kipuw return to Arema in the 2022–23 season. He made his league debut on 30 July 2022 as a substitute in a match against PSIS Semarang at the Kanjuruhan Stadium, Malang.

== Career statistics ==
=== International ===
As of match played 30 March 2016

Appearances and goals by national team and year
National team	Year	Apps	Goals
Indonesia	2013	4	0
Indonesia	2014	1	0
Indonesia	2015	2	0
Total		7	0

== Honours ==
Arema

- Menpora Cup: 2013
- Indonesian Inter Island Cup: 2014/15
- Indonesia President's Cup: 2022

PSM Makassar

- Piala Indonesia: 2019

Indonesia U-23

- SEA Games silver medal: 2011

== Personal life ==
Kipuw is a devout Muslim who observes the Islamic month of Ramadan.
