= Abdul Rahman Sulaeman =

Indonesian footballer

Abdul Rahman
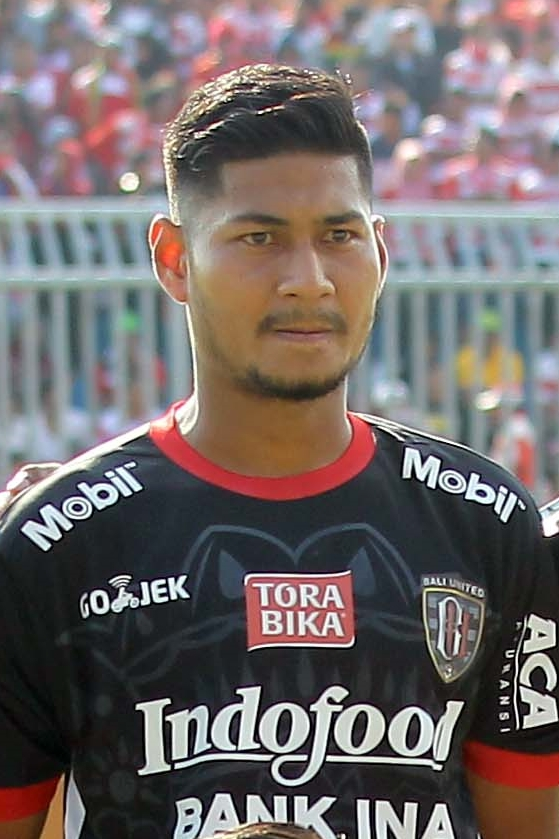
- Abdul Rahman with Bali United in 2017

Personal information
- Full name: Abdul Rahman Sulaeman
- Date of birth: 14 May 1988 (age 38)
- Place of birth: Makassar, Indonesia
- Height: 1.89 m (6 ft 2 in)
- Position: Centre-back

Team information
- Current team: Persikama Magelang
- Number: 17

Youth career
- 2003–2004: PPLP Makassar
- 2004–2005: Diklat Ragunan
- 2005–2009: Persita Tangerang

Senior career*
Years	Team	Apps	(Gls)
2006–2010	Persita Tangerang	42	(1)
2010–2011	Pelita Jaya	18	(0)
2011–2012	Semen Padang	18	(0)
2013–2014	Sriwijaya	27	(0)
2014–2015	Persib Bandung	12	(1)
2015–2016	Karketu Dili	9	(2)
2016–2017	Bali United	21	(0)
2018–2023	PSM Makassar	50	(2)
2023–2024	Mangiwang	8	(0)
2024–2025	Persikabo 1973	15	(0)
2025–	Persikama Magelang	0	(0)

International career
2011–2012	Indonesia U23	8	(1)
2012–2018	Indonesia	2	(0)
Medal record
Men's football
Representing Indonesia
Southeast Asian Games
Silver medal – second place	2011 Jakarta-Palembang	Team
- * Club domestic league appearances and goals as of 30 January 2025

Abdul Rahman Sulaeman (born 14 May 1988) is an Indonesian professional footballer who plays as a center-back for Liga 4 club Persikama Magelang. He started his international career in Indonesia U23. He made his debut for senior national team in the 2014 FIFA World Cup qualification against Bahrain on 29 February 2012, of which ended in 10–0 demolition for Indonesia, their worst ever defeat.

== Club career ==
He signed a contract with Persib Bandung on 23 November 2013. On 16 January 2016, he signed a contract with Karketu Dili.

== International career ==
He made his debut for Indonesia in 2014 FIFA World Cup qualification against Bahrain on 29 February 2012.

== Career statistics ==
=== International ===
As of match played 10 October 2018

Appearances and goals by national team and year
National team	Year	Apps	Goals
Indonesia	2012	1	0
Indonesia	2018	1	0
Total		2	0

=== International goals ===
Abdul Rahman: International under-23 goals

Goal	Date	Venue	Opponent	Score	Result	Competition
1	25 October 2011	Gelora Bung Karno Stadium, Jakarta, Indonesia	Timor-Leste U23	1–0	5–0	Friendly Match

== Honours ==
=== Club ===
Semen Padang

- Indonesia Premier League: 2011–12
- Piala Indonesia runner-up: 2012

Persib Bandung

- Indonesia Super League: 2014
- Indonesia President's Cup: 2015

PSM Makassar

- Liga 1: 2022–23
- Piala Indonesia: 2018–19

Mangiwang

- Liga 3 South Sulawesi: 2023–24

=== International ===
Indonesia U-23

- SEA Games silver medal: 2011
