= 2014 FIFA World Cup qualification – AFC first round =

International football competition

This page provides the summaries of the AFC first round matches for 2014 FIFA World Cup qualification.

== Format ==
In this round the sixteen lowest seeded teams were drawn into 8 home-and-away ties. The draw took place on 30 March 2011 at AFC House in Kuala Lumpur, Malaysia.

The matches were held prior to the main draw for the 2014 FIFA World Cup, with first legs on 29 June 2011 and second legs on 2 and 3 July. The 8 winners advanced to the second round of the Asian qualifiers.

== Seeding ==
Teams were seeded into two pots – Pot 1 included teams ranked 28–35 and Pot 2 teams ranked 36–43.

Pot 1	Pot 2
Malaysia; Afghanistan; Cambodia; Nepal; Bangladesh; Sri Lanka; Vietnam; Mongolia	Pakistan; Palestine; Timor-Leste; Macau; Chinese Taipei; Myanmar; Philippines; Laos

== Results ==
Team 1	Agg.	Team 2	1st leg	2nd leg
Malaysia	4–4 (a)	Chinese Taipei	2–1	2–3
Bangladesh	3–0	Pakistan	3–0	0–0
Cambodia	6–8	Laos	4–2	2–6 (a.e.t.)
Sri Lanka	1–5	Philippines	1–1	0–4
Afghanistan	1–3	Palestine	0–2	1–1
Vietnam	13–1	Macau	6–0	7–1
Nepal	7–1	Timor-Leste	2–1	5–0
Mongolia	1–2	Myanmar	1–0	0–2

29 June 2011
20:45 UTC+8

Malaysia	2–1	Chinese Taipei
Safiq 28'; Aidil 54'	Report	Chen Po-liang 76'

Bukit Jalil National Stadium, Kuala Lumpur
Attendance: 45,000
Referee: Chaiya Mahapab (Thailand)
3 July 2011
19:00 UTC+8

Chinese Taipei	3–2	Malaysia
Chang Han 31'; Chen Po-liang 44' (pen.); Xavier Chen 75' (pen.)	Report	Aidil 8'; Safiq 40'

Municipal Stadium, Taipei
Attendance: 16,768
Referee: Võ Minh Trí (Vietnam)

4–4 on aggregate. Malaysia won on the away goals rule and advanced to the second round against Singapore.

29 June 2011
18:00 UTC+6

Bangladesh	3–0	Pakistan
Jahid 1'; Zahid 22'; Rezaul 56'	Report

Bangabandhu National Stadium, Dhaka
Attendance: 5,326
Referee: Mohammad Abu Loum (Jordan)
3 July 2011
20:30 UTC+5

Pakistan	0–0	Bangladesh
	Report

Punjab Stadium, Lahore
Attendance: 3,500
Referee: Ali Abdulnabi (Bahrain)

Bangladesh won 3–0 on aggregate and advanced to the second round against Lebanon.

29 June 2011
15:00 UTC+7

Cambodia	4–2	Laos
Laboravy 52'; Nasa 58', 89'; Sokumpheak 68'	Report	Manolom 10', 61'

Olympic Stadium, Phnom Penh
Attendance: 25,000
Referee: Yadollah Jahanbazi (Iran)
3 July 2011
18:00 UTC+7

Laos	6–2 (a.e.t.)	Cambodia
Lamnao 19', 55'; Khampheng 34'; Souliya 46'; Visay 94'; Kanlaya 112' (pen.)	Report	Chhoeun 45'; Sokumpheak 75'

New Laos National Stadium, Vientiane
Attendance: 9,000
Referee: Ryuji Sato (Japan)

Laos won 8–6 on aggregate after extra time and advanced to the second round against China.

29 June 2011
16:00 UTC+5:30

Sri Lanka	1–1	Philippines
Chathura 43'	Report	Burkey 50'

Sugathadasa Stadium, Colombo
Attendance: 4,000
Referee: Tayeb Shamsuzzaman (Bangladesh)
3 July 2011
15:30 UTC+8

Philippines	4–0	Sri Lanka
Caligdong 20'; P. Younghusband 43', 57' (pen.); Guirado 50'	Report

Rizal Memorial Stadium, Manila
Attendance: 12,500
Referee: Kim Sang-Woo (Korea Republic)

Philippines won 5–1 on aggregate and advanced to the second round against Kuwait.

29 June 2011
16:00 UTC+5

Afghanistan	0–2	Palestine
	Report	Alyan 22'; Al-Amour 88'

Metallurg Stadium, Tursunzoda (Tajikistan) (Note: Due to the unstable situation in Afghanistan, the first leg was played in Tajikistan.)
Attendance: 5,000
Referee: Nasser Darwish (Jordan)
3 July 2011
17:00 UTC+3

Palestine	1–1	Afghanistan
Wadi 12'	Report	Arezou 63'

Faisal Al-Husseini International Stadium, Al-Ram
Attendance: 9,000
Referee: Banjar Al-Dosari (Qatar)

Palestine won 3–1 on aggregate and advanced to the second round against Thailand.

29 June 2011
19:15 UTC+7

Vietnam	6–0	Macau
Lê Công Vinh 20', 36', 42' (pen.); Phạm Thành Lương 62'; Nguyễn Ngọc Thanh 67'; Nguyễn Văn Quyết 89'	Report

Thống Nhất Stadium, Ho Chi Minh City
Attendance: 20,000
Referee: Dmitry Mashentsev (Kyrgyzstan)
3 July 2011
19:00 UTC+8

Macau	1–7	Vietnam
Leong Ka Hang 60'	Report	Huỳnh Quang Thanh 3', 86'; Nguyễn Quang Hải 24'; Lê Công Vinh 29', 43', 76', 82' (pen.)

Estádio Campo Desportivo, Macau
Attendance: 500
Referee: Kadhum Auda (Iraq)

Vietnam won 13–1 on aggregate and advanced to the second round against Qatar.

29 June 2011
15:30 UTC+5:45

Nepal	2–1	Timor-Leste
A. Gurung 15' (pen.); J. Rai 70'	Report	João Kik 47'

Dasarath Rangasala Stadium, Kathmandu
Attendance: 9,000
Referee: Ali Sabbagh (Lebanon)
2 July 2011
15:30 UTC+5:45

Timor-Leste	0–5	Nepal
	Report	A. Gurung 4' (pen.); Silwal 56'; J. Rai 59'; J. Shrestha 89'; S. Shrestha 90'

Dasarath Rangasala Stadium, Kathmandu (Nepal) (Note: Due to a lack of technical infrastructure in Timor-Leste, both legs were played in Nepal.)
Attendance: 15,000
Referee: Lee Min-hu (Korea Republic)

Nepal won 7–1 on aggregate and advanced to the second round against Jordan.

29 June 2011
18:30 UTC+8

Mongolia	1–0	Myanmar
Tsend-Ayuush 48'	Report

MFF Football Centre, Ulaanbaatar
Attendance: 3,500
Referee: Kim Jong-hyeok (Korea Republic)
3 July 2011
15:30 UTC+6:30

Myanmar	2–0	Mongolia
Pai Soe 62'; Mai Aih Naing 88'	Report

Thuwunna Stadium, Yangon
Attendance: 18,000
Referee: Liu Kwok Man (Hong Kong)

Myanmar won 2–1 on aggregate and advanced to the second round against Oman.

== Goalscorers ==
There were 60 goals scored in 16 matches, for an average of 3.75 goals per match.

7 goals

- (Vietnam) Lê Công Vinh

2 goals

- (Cambodia) Sam El Nasa
- (Cambodia) Kouch Sokumpheak
- (Chinese Taipei) Chen Po-liang
- (Laos) Manolom Phomsouvanh
- (Laos) Lamnao Singto
- (Malaysia) Aidil Zafuan
- (Malaysia) Safiq Rahim
- (Nepal) Anil Gurung
- (Nepal) Ju Manu Rai
- (Philippines) Phil Younghusband
- (Vietnam) Huỳnh Quang Thanh

1 goal

- (Afghanistan) Balal Arezou
- (Bangladesh) Jahid Hasan Ameli
- (Bangladesh) Mohamed Zahid Hossain
- (Bangladesh) Rezaul Karim
- (Cambodia) Chhin Chhoeun
- (Cambodia) Khoun Laboravy
- (Chinese Taipei) Chang Han
- (Chinese Taipei) Xavier Chen
- (Laos) Visay Phaphouvanin
- (Laos) Khampheng Sayavutthi
- (Laos) Souliya Syphasay
- (Laos) Kanlaya Sysomvang
- (Macau) Leong Ka Hang
- (Mongolia) Khürelbaataryn Tsend-Ayuush
- (Myanmar) Mai Aih Naing
- (Myanmar) Pai Soe
- (Nepal) Jagajeet Shrestha
- (Nepal) Sujal Shrestha
- (Nepal) Bhola Silwal
- (Palestine) Murad Alyan
- (Palestine) Ismail Al-Amour
- (Palestine) Houssam Wadi
- (Philippines) Nate Burkey
- (Philippines) Emelio Caligdong
- (Philippines) Ángel Guirado
- (Sri Lanka) Chathura Gunaratne
- (Timor-Leste) João Kik
- (Vietnam) Nguyễn Ngọc Thanh
- (Vietnam) Nguyễn Quang Hải
- (Vietnam) Nguyễn Văn Quyết
- (Vietnam) Phạm Thành Lương
