= Raul Isac =

East Timorese footballer

Personal information
- Full name: Raul Tyson Isac Dias Monteiro
- Date of birth: 2 February 1988 (age 38)
- Place of birth: Melbourne, Australia
- Position: Defender

Team information
- Current team: Mill Park

Senior career*
Years	Team	Apps	(Gls)
2008–2012	North Sunshine Eagles	50	(22)
2012–2013	Dili United		
2014–2017	North Sunshine Eagles		(21)
2018	Mill Park	10	(10)
2019–	Westside Strikers Caroline Springs		

International career
2011	Timor-Leste U23	3	(0)
2011–2012	Timor-Leste	6	(0)
- * Club domestic league appearances and goals

Raul Tyson Isac Dias Monteiro or Raul Isac (born 2 February 1988) is a footballer who plays as a defender. Born in Australia, he made six appearances for the Timor-Leste national team.

== Club career ==
For four years Isac played for the Victorian 3rd Division State League side North Sunshine Eagles FC. In 2012, he signed with local East Timor side Dili United.

== International career ==
Isac made his senior debut for Timor-Leste on 29 June 2011 in a match against Nepal during the 2014 FIFA World Cup qualifying rounds.

== Personal life ==
Raul was born in Melbourne, Australia to Timorese parents who immigrated there. He studied at RMIT University of Melbourne.
