= Oktovianus Maniani =

Indonesian association footballer

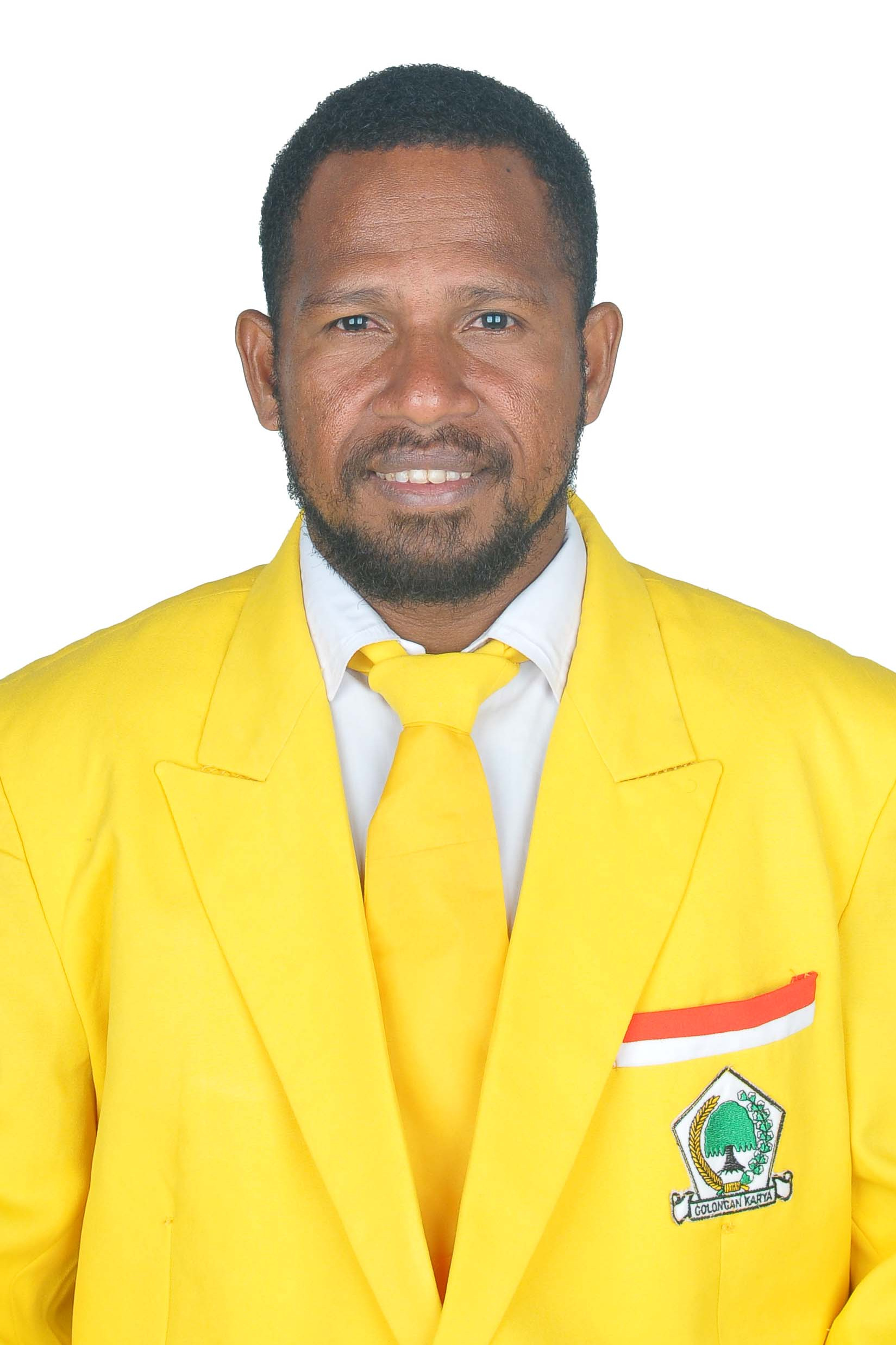
- Okto in 2023

Personal information
- Full name: Oktovianus Maniani
- Date of birth: 27 October 1990 (age 36)
- Place of birth: Jayapura, Indonesia
- Height: 1.62 m (5 ft 4 in)
- Position: Winger

Senior career*
Years	Team	Apps	(Gls)
2008–2009	PSMS Medan	24	(1)
2009–2010	Persitara North Jakarta	13	(2)
2010–2011	Sriwijaya	32	(3)
2011–2012	Persiram Raja Ampat	19	(3)
2013	Persiba Bantul	16	(1)
2013–2014	Barito Putera	13	(1)
2014–2015	Perseru Serui	8	(2)
2015	Borneo	2	(0)
2016	Carsae	8	(6)
2016	Persiba Balikpapan	4	(0)
2016	Arema	18	(0)
2017	Madura	14	(6)
2018	Perserang Serang	16	(7)
2019	Persewar Waropen	14	(0)
2020–2021	Persiba Balikpapan	2	(0)
2022	PSBS Biak	1	(0)
Total		204	(32)

International career
2005	Indonesia U17		
2011–2013	Indonesia U23	14	(0)
2010–2013	Indonesia	29	(3)

Managerial career
- 2025–: Bumi Baliem (head coach)
Medal record
Men's football
Representing Indonesia
Islamic Solidarity Games
Silver medal – second place	2013 Palembang	Team
Southeast Asian Games
Silver medal – second place	2011 Jakarta-Palembang	Team
AFF Championship
Runner-up	2010 Indonesia & Vietnam	Team
- * Club domestic league appearances and goals

Oktovianus Maniani (born 27 October 1990 in Jayapura, Indonesia) is an Indonesian football manager and former footballer who plays as a winger. He's currently the manager of Bumi Baliem. Popularly known simply as "Okto" or "Oman" he gained nationwide popularity in his early caps for the national team, mainly during the 2010 AFF Suzuki Cup, where he is considered one of the contributing players along with teammate Irfan Bachdim. He is considered one of ten Asia players that could hit in Europe by ESPN Soccernet.

== Personal life ==
Okto was born in Jayapura, Papua, to Benjamin Maniani, a fisherman, and Dorince May, both native Papuan. Okto spent his childhood helping his father fishing in the beach of Hamidi, Papua. He is married to Meriam Magdalena Worumboy, and together they have 2 children, Benyamin Elia Maniani and Carien Christine Maniani.

== Club career ==
On 23 December 2014, he signed with Pusamania Borneo.

On 30 January 2016, he signed with Carsae. But due to administrative problems, he just appeared four times and then he became free agent.

== International career ==
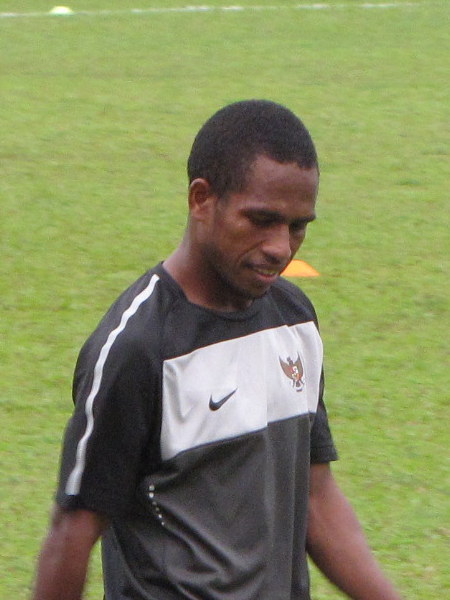
Okto training with Indonesia ahead of the 2010 AFF Suzuki Cup final against Malaysia

His first cap for Indonesia was in a friendly match against Uruguay on 8 October 2010, where he played as a substitute. His well performance in the match led him being placed in the starting lineup by coach Alfred Riedl in another friendly game four days later against Maldives where he scored his first goal for the national team. After the 2010 AFF Suzuki Cup, Okto is part of the under-23 team which competed in the Pre-Olympic Tournament and the 2011 Southeast Asian Games.

== Career statistics ==
=== International ===
Indonesia national team
Year	Apps	Goals
2010	10	3
2011	6	0
2012	11	0
2013	2	0
Total	29	3

== International goals ==
No.	Date	Venue	Opponent	Score	Result	Competition
1.	12 October 2010	Siliwangi Stadium, Bandung, Indonesia	Maldives	1–0	3–0	Friendly
2.	21 November 2010	Gelora Sriwijaya Stadium, Palembang, Indonesia	Timor-Leste	2–0	6–0	Friendly
3.	4 December 2010	Gelora Bung Karno Stadium, Jakarta, Indonesia	Laos	6–0	6–0	2010 AFF Championship

== Style of play ==
Okto is well known for his blistering pace and could easily exposed the opponent's defender via his powerful pace and speed.

== Honours ==
Sriwijaya

- Indonesian Inter Island Cup: 2010
- Indonesian Community Shield: 2010

Indonesia U-23

- SEA Games silver medal: 2011
- Islamic Solidarity Games silver medal: 2013

Indonesia

- AFF Championship runner-up: 2010

Individual

- Piala Indonesia Best Rising Star: 2008–09
- Southeast Asian Games Most Valuable Player: 2011
