= Antonio Marcos Sousa =

East Timorese footballer (born 1990)

Antônio Marcos Sousa
Personal information
- Full name: Antônio Marcos Sousa
- Date of birth: 2 February 1990 (age 36)
- Place of birth: São Paulo, Brazil
- Position: Attacking midfielder

Senior career*
Years	Team	Apps	(Gls)
2008–2010	Paraná Clube		
2010–2012	Botafogo FC		
2012	Ceilândia Esporte Clube		

International career
2011–	Timor-Leste U23	4	(0)
2012–	Timor-Leste	3	(0)
- * Club domestic league appearances and goals

Antônio Marcos Sousa (born February 2, 1990), sometimes known as just Marcos is a footballer who plays as an attacking midfielder. Born in Brazil, he represented the Timor-Leste national team.

== International career ==
Sousa was born at São Paulo, Brazil, and is a naturalized citizen of East Timor. He made his debut for the Portuguese-speaking Southeast Asian country in a friendly match against Indonesia U23 on October 25, 2011 which they lost (5–0).

Sousa attempted to score a goal at all the match he played. Especially during the second match at 2011 SEA Games against Philippines U23.
