= Nguyễn Ngọc Thanh =

Vietnamese footballer

Personal information
- Full name: Nguyễn Ngọc Thanh
- Date of birth: September 20, 1982 (age 44)
- Place of birth: Ho Chi Minh City, Vietnam
- Height: 1.77 m (5 ft 10 in)
- Position: Striker

Youth career
- 1995–2003: Đông Á Bank

Senior career*
Years	Team	Apps	(Gls)
2004	Đông Á Bank	2	(0)
2005–2010	Vicem Hải Phòng	64	(28)
2011–2013	SHB Đà Nẵng	36	(16)
2013–2014	Quảng Nam	7	(1)

International career
2008–2011	Vietnam	2	(1)
- * Club domestic league appearances and goals

Nguyễn Ngọc Thanh (born September 20, 1982) is a retired Vietnamese footballer who played for the Vietnam national football team and SHB Đà Nẵng, Quảng Nam and Cần Thơ in the V-League.

== International goals ==
No.	Date	Venue	Opponent	Score	Result	Competition
1.	29 March 2011	Thong Nhat Stadium, Ho Chi Minh City, Vietnam	Macau	5–0	6–0	2014 FIFA World Cup qualification
