= Gunawan Dwi Cahyo =

Indonesian footballer (born 1989)

Personal information
- Date of birth: 20 April 1989 (age 37)
- Place of birth: Jepara, Indonesia
- Height: 1.82 m (6 ft 0 in)
- Position: Centre-back

Youth career
- 2000–2004: Kenari Star
- 2004–2008: Persijap Jepara

Senior career*
Years	Team	Apps	(Gls)
2008–2009	PSIS Semarang	4	(0)
2009–2010	Persik Kediri	21	(0)
2010–2011	Sriwijaya	1	(0)
2011–2012	Arema Indonesia	16	(1)
2012–2013	Persijap Jepara	28	(3)
2013–2014	Mitra Kukar	7	(0)
2015–2018	Persija Jakarta	41	(4)
2019–2023	Bali United	16	(0)
2023	Persik Kediri	2	(0)
2023–2024	Kalteng Putra	5	(0)
2024–2025	Bekasi City	1	(0)
Total		142	(8)

International career
2011	Indonesia U23	10	(2)
2012–2016	Indonesia	1	(0)
Medal record
Men's football
Representing Indonesia
Southeast Asian Games
Silver medal – second place	2011 Jakarta-Palembang	Team
AFF Championship
Runner-up	2016 Myanmar & Philippines	Team
- * Club domestic league appearances and goals as of 8 September 2024

Gunawan Dwi Cahyo (born 20 April 1989) is an Indonesian former professional footballer.

== International career ==
He made his debut for Indonesia in 2014 FIFA World Cup qualification against Bahrain on 29 February 2012.

Gunawan Dwi Cahyo: International under-23 goals

Goal	Date	Venue	Opponent	Score	Result	Competition
1	7 November 2011	Gelora Bung Karno Stadium, Jakarta, Indonesia	Cambodia U-23	3 - 0	6 - 0	2011 Southeast Asian Games
2	21 November 2011	Gelora Bung Karno Stadium, Jakarta, Indonesia	Malaysia U-23	0 - 1	1 - 1 (4 - 3 pen.)	2011 Southeast Asian Games

== Honours ==
=== Club ===
Sriwijaya

- Indonesian Community Shield: 2010
- Indonesian Inter Island Cup: 2010

Persija Jakarta

- Liga 1: 2018
- Indonesia President's Cup: 2018

Bali United

- Liga 1: 2019, 2021–22

=== International ===
Indonesia U-23

- SEA Games silver medal: 2011

Indonesia

- AFF Championship runner-up: 2016
