= Zaw Zaw Oo =

Burmese footballer

Personal information
- Full name: Zaw Zaw Oo
- Date of birth: 31 July 1989 (age 37)
- Height: 1.76 m (5 ft 9 1/2 in)
- Position: Defender

Team information
- Current team: Ayeyawady United

Senior career*
Years	Team	Apps	(Gls)
- Ayeyawady United

International career^{‡}
2011–	Myanmar	8	(0)
2011–	Myanmar U-23	6	(0)
- * Club domestic league appearances and goals ‡ National team caps and goals as of 4 March 2013

Zaw Zaw Oo (Burmese: ဇော်ဇော်ဦး; born 31 July 1989) is a footballer from Burma. He is a defender for the Myanmar national football team and Myanmar U-23. He is the bronze medalist with Myanmar U-23 in 2011 SEA Games.

He current plays for Ayeyawady United in Myanmar National League.
