= Tanapol Udomlap =

Thai footballer (born 1989)

Personal information
- Full name: Tanapol Udomlap
- Date of birth: 15 February 1989 (age 37)
- Place of birth: Thailand
- Height: 1.80 m (5 ft 11 in)
- Position: Centre-back

Team information
- Current team: MOF Customs United
- Number: 15

Senior career*
Years	Team	Apps	(Gls)
2009	Customs United		
2010	Bangkok		
2011	TTM		
2012	Air Force United		
2013	Police United	0	(0)
2014	Trat		
2015	Songkhla United		
2016	Looktabfah		
2017	Super Power Samut Prakan	11	(2)
2018	Army United		
2019	Samut Sakhon		
2020–	MOF Customs United		

International career
2011	Thailand U23		
- * Club domestic league appearances and goals

Tanapol Udomlap (born February 15, 1989) is a Thai professional footballer who plays as a centre-back.
