= Nurrul Aleshahnezan Metali =

Bruneian footballer

Nurrul Aleshanezan
Personal information
- Full name: Pengiran Nurrul Aleshahnezan bin Pengiran Metali
- Date of birth: 21 January 1989 (age 37)
- Place of birth: Brunei
- Positions: Midfielder; defender

Senior career*
Years	Team	Apps	(Gls)
2007–2010	NBT		
2011–2013	Majra		
2014–2016	Indera		(2)
2019	LG FT		
2022	Almerez		

International career^{‡}
2005	Brunei U16		
2005	Brunei U20		
2007	Brunei U21	3	(0)
2011	Brunei U23	3	(0)
2008	Brunei	2	(0)
- * Club domestic league appearances and goals as of 7 August 2022 ‡ National team caps and goals as of 9 August 2017

Pengiran Nurrul Aleshahnezan bin Pengiran Metali (born 21 January 1989) is a Bruneian former footballer who played as a midfielder or defender. He appeared twice for the Brunei national football team in 2008.

== Club career ==
Aleshahnezan first played league football for NBT FC in the Brunei Premier League from 2007 to 2010. Afterwards he moved to Majra FC after the conclusion of the 2011 Southeast Asian Games. He switched clubs to Indera SC for the 2014 Brunei Super League season, and stayed there for three years, winning the championship in his first year.

== International career ==
Aleshahnezan played for Brunei under-16s at the 2005 Lion City Cup, then the 2005 AFF U-20 Youth Championship held in Singapore and Indonesia respectively. He then played three games for the under-21s at the 2007 Hassanal Bolkiah Trophy. He made his international debut for the national team at the 2008 AFC Challenge Cup qualification matches held in the Philippines. He played twice in that tournament, against the home side and also Bhutan.

Three years later, Aleshahnezan travelled with the national under-23 team to Indonesia for the 26th SEA Games, at a time when Brunei was just recovering from a two-year exile from international football. He started in the only victory for the Young Wasps, a 2–1 win over the Philippines.

== Honours ==
Indera SC

- Brunei Super League: 2014
- Piala Sumbangsih: 2015

== Personal life ==
Aleshahnezan's brothers are also footballers. Elder brother Aleshahfezan is a former player for Jerudong FC, while younger brothers Jumatatul Aleshahrezan and Iddzaham Aleshahmezan have represented Brunei football youth teams, and afterwards for the Brunei national futsal team.
