= Fandi Othman =

Malaysian professional footballer

Personal information
- Full name: Muhammad Fandi bin Othman
- Date of birth: 25 April 1992 (age 34)
- Place of birth: Johor Bahru, Malaysia
- Height: 1.72 m (5 ft 7 1/2 in)
- Position: Left back

Team information
- Current team: Bunga Raya F.C.
- Number: 26

Youth career
- Bukit Jalil Sports School

Senior career*
Years	Team	Apps	(Gls)
2009–2014	Harimau Muda A	56	(1)
2015–2017	Johor Darul Ta'zim II	1	(0)
2017	→ Melaka United (loan)	5	(0)
2018	Felcra	17	(0)
2019	PKNS	2	(0)
2019	→ Selangor (loan)	14	(0)
2020	Kuala Lumpur City	5	(0)
2021	Kedah Darul Aman	7	(0)
2022	Sri Pahang	5	(0)
2023	Kelantan United	14	(0)
2024–2025	PT Athletic F.C.		

International career
2009–2011	Malaysia U-19	16	(0)
2009–2015	Malaysia U-23	20	(4)
2009–	Malaysia	1	(0)
Medal record
Malaysia U23
SEA Games
Gold medal – first place	2011 Jakarta	Football
- * Club domestic league appearances and goals

Muhammad Fandi bin Othman (born 25 April 1992) is a Malaysian professional footballer who plays as left back.

== Club career ==
Fandi was once given a trial from the Slovak team FC ViOn Zlaté Moravce.

On 29 December 2017, it was announced that Fandi signed a contract with Malaysia Premier League club Felcra for the 2018 Malaysia Premier League.

=== Kedah ===
On 3 March 2021 Fandi agreed to join Malaysia Super League side Kedah Darul Aman. He made his league debut with the club on 17 March, in a 3–1 home win against Petaling Jaya City FC.

== Honours ==
Harimau Muda

- Malaysia Premier League: 2009

Johor Darul Takzim

- Malaysian Charity Shield: 2015 Winner

International

- SEA Games: 2011
- Pestabola Merdeka: 2013

== See also ==
- Harimau Muda A
- Malaysia national football team
