= Mai Aih Naing =

Burmese footballer

Personal information
- Full name: Mai Aih Naing
- Date of birth: 18 October 1990 (age 36)
- Place of birth: Taungoo, Burma
- Position: Striker

Team information
- Current team: Ayeyawady United F.C.

Senior career*
Years	Team	Apps	(Gls)
2011–2016	Shan United	48	(12)
2017	GFA F.C.		
2018	Ayeyawady United F.C.		

International career
2011–	Myanmar U23	2	(1)
2010–	Myanmar	7	(1)
- * Club domestic league appearances and goals

Mai Aih Naing (born 18 October 1990 in Taungoo, Burma) is a Burmese footballer. He plays for club Okktha United in Myanmar National League as a striker. He was called to Myanmar national football team at the 2010 AFF Suzuki Cup and 2014 FIFA World Cup qualifiers.

== U23 ==
No.	Date	Venue	Opponent	Score	Result	Competition
1.	15 November 2011	Lebak Bulus Stadium, Jakarta, Indonesia	Timor-Leste	1–0	1–0	2011 Southeast Asian Games

== Myanmar ==
No.	Date	Venue	Opponent	Score	Result	Competition
1.	3 July 2011	Thuwunna Stadium, Yangon, Myanmar	Mongolia	2–0	2–0	2014 FIFA World Cup qualification
