= Aye San =

Burmese footballer

Personal information
- Full name: Aye San
- Date of birth: 24 December 1988
- Place of birth: Yangon, Myanmar
- Date of death: 12 June 2020 (aged 31)
- Place of death: Dawei, Myanmar
- Height: 1.74 m (5 ft 9 in)
- Position: Defender

Senior career*
Years	Team	Apps	(Gls)
2009–2014	Kanbawza	139	(4)
2014–2015	Nay Pyi Taw	5	(0)

International career
2007–2011	Myanmar U-23	9	(1)
2008–2015	Myanmar	9	(0)
Medal record
Men's football
Representing Myanmar
Southeast Asian Games
Silver medal – second place	2007 Kuala Lumpur	Team
Bronze medal – third place	2011 Jakarta & Palembang	Team
- * Club domestic league appearances and goals

Aye San (24 December 1988 – 12 June 2020) was a Burmese footballer who played as a defender.

== Club career ==
Aye San played for Kanbawza (now Shan United) and Nay Pyi Taw before retiring in 2015 to become a coach.

== International career ==
Aye San represented Myanmar at the 2007 and 2011 SEA Games, winning medals on both occasions.

He made his debut for the senior national team in 2008.

== International goals ==
No.	Date	Venue	Opponent	Score	Result	Competition
1.	13 November 2011	Lebak Bulus Stadium, Jakarta, Indonesia	Philippines	1–0	5–0	2011 SEA Games

== Death ==
Aye San died on 12 June 2020 when he drowned during a visit to Thayet Chaung Waterfall in Dawei.
