= Diogo Rangel =

Brazilian footballer (born 1991)

Personal information
- Full name: Diogo Santos Rangel
- Date of birth: 19 August 1991 (age 35)
- Place of birth: São Paulo, Brazil
- Height: 1.85 m (6 ft 1 in)
- Position: Defender

Team information
- Current team: São Bento

Youth career
- 2004–2007: Clube Pequeninos do Jockey
- 2007–2010: Portuguesa

Senior career*
Years	Team	Apps	(Gls)
2010	Vasco da Gama	0	(0)
2011	Palmeiras	0	(0)
2012	Karketu Dili	?	(?)
2012–2013	Sriwijaya	12	(1)
2013	→ Gresik United (loan)	16	(1)
2014	Daejeon Citizen	12	(0)
2014	Gangwon FC	11	(0)
2015	Osotspa	14	(1)
2015	Bragantino	0	(0)
2016	Songkhla United	32	(1)
2017	Botafogo-PB	13	(0)
2017	São Caetano	15	(0)
2018	Anapolina	18	(0)
2018	Boavista Timor Leste	0	(0)
2018–2019	Zaria Bălți	9	(0)
2019	Sampaio Corrêa	3	(0)
2019–2020	Lee Man	15	(1)
2021	Toledo	12	(0)
2022–2023	Boavista	22	(1)
2023	Novo Hamburgo	10	(1)
2024	Inter de Lages	11	(1)
2024	Samut Prakan City	15	(0)
2025–	São Bento	0	(0)

International career^{‡}
2012	Timor-Leste U-21	4	(1)
2011–2014	Timor-Leste U-23	11	(2)
2012–2016	Timor-Leste	17	(0)
- * Club domestic league appearances and goals as of 21 March 2021 ‡ National team caps and goals as of 7 June 2016

Diogo Santos Rangel (born 19 August 1991) is a footballer who plays as a defender for club São Bento. Born in Brazil, he played for the Timor-Leste national football team.

== Club careers ==
=== Dili United ===
After he defended the Timor Leste U-23 in the arena Southeast Asian Games he joined a local club in Dili, Timor Leste, namely Dili United.

=== Sriwijaya Football Club ===
After undergoing selection for two weeks with Sriwijaya, Diogo got a contract offer from the club's management. On 8 November 2012 Diogo agreed to sign a three-year contract with Sriwijaya. He scored his first goal for Sriwijaya against Persisam Putra Samarinda, but his goal could not help his team from losing 2–4.

=== Gresik United ===
In May 2013 Diogo loaned to Gresik United from the Sriwijaya for 5-month until the end of season.

=== Daejeon Citizen ===
In March 2014 Diogo join Daejeon Citizen.

=== Lee Man ===
On 19 July 2019, Diogo signed for Hong Kong Premier League club Lee Man. On 21 January 2020, his contract was terminated.

== International career ==
Despite having no links with East Timor, Diogo had been naturalised and played for the country at three different levels between 2011 and 2016.

He began his international career as a Timor Leste U-23 that in preparing for the Southeast Asian Games in November 2011. Diogo made his debut as a national team U-23 as warm-up match against Indonesia U-23 on 25 October 2011, which ended in defeat 0–5. After that he played in 5 games and scored 1 goal in the event the Southeast Asian Games. In February 2012 he summons national team U-21 to compete in the arena 2012 Hassanal Bolkiah Trophy, in the event he scored 1 goal in 4 games. In July 2012 was recalled to the national team U-23 that competed in the 2013 AFC U-22 Asian Cup qualification. In this tournament he played 5 times and scored one goal.

On 5 October 2012 he made his debut as a Timor Leste national football team in the match against Cambodia in the event the 2012 AFF Suzuki Cup qualification which ended with a 5–1 win. Until now Diogo has played in four games for the national team.

== Honours ==
Sriwijaya

- Indonesian Inter Island Cup: 2012

Daejeon Citizen

- K League Challenge: 2014

São Caetano

- Campeonato Paulista Série A2: 2017
