= Paolo Pascual =

Japanese footballer (born 1991)

Jose Paolo Aragon Pascual (born 22 January 1991) is a Filipino former footballer who played as a goalkeeper.

== Early life ==
Pascual started playing football at the age of seven.

== Education ==
Pascual attended the University of San Carlos in the Philippines.

== Career ==
Pascual was called up to the Philippines national football team.

== Style of play ==
Pascual was a striker before switching to goalkeeper.

== Personal life ==
Pascual is the son of two dentists.
