= Pheak Rady =

Cambodian footballer

Personal information
- Full name: Pheak Rady(ភ័ក្រ្ត រ៉ាឌី)
- Date of birth: January 22, 1989 (age 37)
- Place of birth: Kandal, Cambodia
- Height: 1.77 m (5 ft 9 1/2 in)
- Position: Right back

Senior career*
Years	Team	Apps	(Gls)
- Kandal Province
- Kompong Speu Province
- Phnom Penh Empire
- Khemara Keila
- National Defense Ministry
2011–2013	Phnom Penh Crown		
2013–2014	Boeung Ket Rubber Field		
2015	National Defense Ministry		
2016–2017	Cambodian Tiger		

International career
2007–2011	Cambodia	5	(0)
- * Club domestic league appearances and goals

Pheak Rady (born January 22, 1989) is a former Cambodian footballer who last played for Cambodian Tiger. He was called up for Cambodia national football team in 2007.

== Honours ==
=== Club ===
National Defense Ministry

- Hun Sen Cup: 2010
