= Attapong Kittichamratsak =

Thai footballer (born 1990)

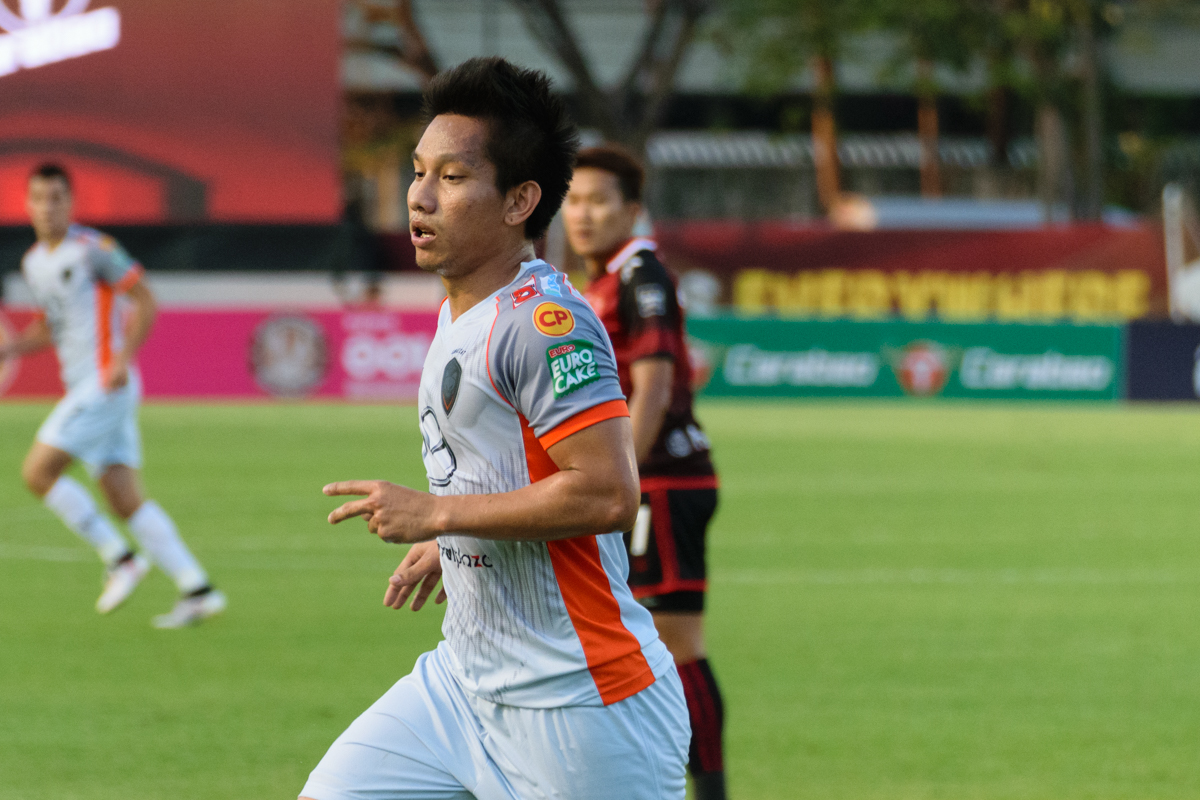

Personal information
- Full name: Attapong Kittichamratsak
- Birth name: Attapong Nooprom
- Date of birth: 13 February 1990 (age 36)
- Place of birth: Chonburi, Thailand
- Height: 1.72 m (5 ft 7 1/2 in)
- Position: Attacking midfielder

Team information
- Current team: Trat
- Number: 33

Youth career
- 2004–2007: Assumption Thonburi

Senior career*
Years	Team	Apps	(Gls)
2007–2008	Tampines Rovers	22	(3)
2009–2010	Chonburi	2	(0)
2009	→ Sriracha (loan)	18	(1)
2010–2011	Sriracha	36	(5)
2012	Ratchaburi Mitr Phol	30	(10)
2013	Buriram United	1	(0)
2013–2016	Ratchaburi Mitr Phol	47	(0)
2015	→ Air Force Central (loan)	16	(2)
2017	Army United	21	(4)
2018–2019	Nakhon Ratchasima	26	(1)
2020–2021	Sisaket	17	(2)
2021	Rayong	12	(1)
2022	Navy	21	(2)
2022	Chainat Hornbill	10	(1)
2023–2024	Pattaya Dolphins United	26	(1)
2024–	Trat	25	(2)

International career
2007–2008	Thailand U19	22	(7)
2010–2011	Thailand U23	4	(2)
2012	Thailand	3	(0)
- * Club domestic league appearances and goals as of 26 April 2025

Attapong Kittichamratsak (Thai: อรรถพงศ์ กิตติจำรัสศักดิ์, born February 13, 1990, as Attapong Nooprom (Thai: อรรถพงศ์ หนูพรหม)), is a Thai professional footballer who plays as an attacking midfielder for Thai League 2 club Trat.

== International career ==
Attapong played for Thailand U19, and played in the 2008 AFC U-19 Championship. In September, 2012 Rattana was called up in a friendly match against Laos

=== International ===
As of 12 November 2015

National team	Year	Apps	Goals
Thailand	2012	3	0
Thailand	Total	3	0

== International goals ==
=== Under-19 ===
#	Date	Venue	Opponent	Score	Result	Competition
1.	31 July 2007	Thanh Long Sports Complex, Ho Chi Minh City, Vietnam	Brunei	1-0	7-0	2007 AFF U-20 Youth Championship
2.	3 November 2008	Prince Saud bin Jalawi Stadium, Khobar, Saudi Arabia	Jordan	3-0	3-2	2008 AFC U-19 Championship

== Honours ==
=== Club ===
Sriracha

- Thai Division 1 League: 2010

Ratchaburi

- Thai Division 1 League: 2012

Pattaya Dolphins United

- Thai League 3 Eastern Region: 2022–23
