= Lâm Anh Quang =

Vietnamese footballer (born 1991)

Personal information
- Full name: Lâm Anh Quang
- Date of birth: 24 April 1991 (age 35)
- Place of birth: Nam Trực, Nam Định, Vietnam
- Height: 1.80 m (5 ft 11 in)
- Position: Center-back

Team information
- Current team: Xuân Thiện Phú Thọ
- Number: 67

Youth career
- 2006–2017: Nam Định

Senior career*
Years	Team	Apps	(Gls)
2016–2018	SHB Đà Nẵng	32	(1)
2019–2021	Nam Định	26	(1)
2022–2023	SHB Đà Nẵng	20	(0)
2023–2025	Hồng Lĩnh Hà Tĩnh	22	(2)
2025–	Xuân Thiện Phú Thọ	3	(0)
- * Club domestic league appearances and goals as of 5 October 2025

Lâm Anh Quang (born 24 April 1991) is a Vietnamese professional footballer who plays as a center-back for V.League 2 club Xuân Thiện Phú Thọ.
