= Paseuthsack Souliyavong =

Laotian footballer

Personal information
- Full name: Paseuthsack Souliyavong
- Date of birth: 26 October 1990 (age 36)
- Place of birth: Laos
- Height: 1.80 m (5 ft 11 in)
- Position: Midfielder

Senior career*
Years	Team	Apps	(Gls)
2007	Yotha		
2013–2016	Lao Toyota		

International career^{‡}
2014–2016	Laos	3	(0)
- * Club domestic league appearances and goals as of 12:39, 23 November 2014 (UTC) ‡ National team caps and goals as of 12:39, 23 November 2014 (UTC)

Paseuthsack Souliyavong (born 26 October 1990) is a former Laotian professional footballer who played as a midfielder.

In 2017, Souliyavong was banned for life from football-related activities, together with 21 other footballers, for match manipulation.
