= Natarid Thammarossopon =

Thai footballer (born 1988)

Personal information
- Full name: Natarid Thammarossopon
- Date of birth: 14 March 1988 (age 38)
- Place of birth: Bangkok, Thailand
- Height: 1.71 m (5 ft 7 in)
- Positions: Left winger; forward

Youth career
- 2004–2008: BEC Tero Sasana

Senior career*
Years	Team	Apps	(Gls)
2009–2012	BEC Tero Sasana	9	(3)
2011	→ Police United (loan)	5	(2)
2012–2013	Muangthong United	0	(0)
2014–2015	Chainat Hornbill	11	(2)
2015	→ Nakhon Ratchasima (loan)	4	(0)
2016–2017	Dome	23	(3)
2019	Kasetsart	6	(1)
Total		58	(11)

International career
2004	Thailand U16	13	(5)
2011	Thailand U23	9	(4)
- * Club domestic league appearances and goals

Natarid Thammarossopon (Thai: ณธฤษภ์ ธรรมรสโสภณ, born March 14, 1988), is a Thai retired professional footballer who played as a winger.

== Honours ==
=== Club ===
Muangthong United

- Thai League 1 Champions (1) : 2012
