= Nyarna Lwin =

Burmese footballer

Personal information
- Full name: Nyarna Lwin
- Date of birth: July 2, 1990 (age 36)
- Position: Defender

International career
Years	Team	Apps	(Gls)
2010–	Myanmar	2	(0)

Nyarna Lwin (born 2 July 1990) is a footballer from Myanmar. He made his first appearance for the Myanmar national football team in 2010.
