= Yan Aung Win =

Burmese footballer (born 1992)

Personal information
- Full name: Yan Aung Win
- Date of birth: September 9, 1992 (age 34)
- Place of birth: Mandalay, Myanmar
- Height: 1.67 m (5 ft 5 1/2 in)
- Position: Right back

Team information
- Current team: Hanthawaddy United

Senior career*
| Years | Team | Apps | (Gls) |
| 2009–2012 | Yangon United | | |
| 2013–2014 | Yadanarbon | | |
| 2014 | Shan United | | |
| 2015 – 2016 | Zeyar Shwe Myay | 32 | (2) |
| 2017 – | Hanthawaddy United | | |

International career
| 2010– | Myanmar | 13 | (1) |
| 2011– | Myanmar U-23 | 6 | (2) |
| 2012– | Myanmar U-22 | 5 | (2) |
- * Club domestic league appearances and goals

Yan Aung Win (born 9 September 1992) is a footballer from Myanmar. He made his first appearance for the Myanmar national football team in 2010. He is the two-time Myanmar National League winner with Yangon United and bronze medalist with Myanmar U-23 in 2011 Southeast Asian Games. In 2013, he moved to Yadanarbon along with teammate Kaung Sithu. He is the first choice rightback for his club and national football team.

== International goals ==
| No. | Date | Venue | Opponent | Score | Result | Competition |
|---|---|---|---|---|---|---|
| 1. | 5 October 2012 | Thuwunna Stadium, Yangon, Myanmar | Brunei | 1–0 | 1–0 | 2012 AFF Championship qualification |
