= Hoàng Đình Tùng =

Vietnamese footballer (born 1988)

Personal information
- Full name: Hoàng Đình Tùng
- Date of birth: 24 August 1988 (age 38)
- Place of birth: Nông Cống, Thanh Hóa, Vietnam
- Height: 1.68 m (5 ft 6 in)
- Position: Striker

Team information
- Current team: PVF-CAND B
- Number: 9

Youth career
- 1998–2004: Thanh Hóa

Senior career*
Years	Team	Apps	(Gls)
2005–2011	Thanh Hóa	122	(41)
2011–2014	Hải Phòng	52	(11)
2014–2024	Thanh Hóa	124	(39)
2025–	PVF-CAND B		

International career^{‡}
2008–2011	Vietnam U23	26	(5)
2011–2015	Vietnam	7	(0)
- * Club domestic league appearances and goals as of 20 April 2019 (UTC) ‡ National team caps and goals as of 23 January 2018

Hoàng Đình Tùng (Note: In this Vietnamese name, the surname is Hoàng, but is often simplified to Hoang in English-language text. In accordance with Vietnamese custom, this person should be referred to by the given name, Đình Tùng.) (born 24 August 1988) is a Vietnamese professional footballer who plays as a striker for PVF-CAND B. He represented Vietnam national team on 7 occasions between 2011 and 2015.

Đình Tùng is considered as one of the best players in Thanh Hóa history, having won 4 major titles with the team.

== Honours ==
=== Club ===
Thanh Hóa

- Vietnamese National Cup: 2023, 2023–24
- Vietnamese Super Cup: 2009, 2023

Hải Phòng

- Vietnamese National Cup: 2014

=== International ===
Vietnam U23

- SEA Games silver medal: 2009

Vietnam

- AYA Bank Cup: 2016
