= Âu Văn Hoàn =

Vietnamese footballer (born 1989)

Personal information
- Full name: Âu Văn Hoàn
- Date of birth: 1 October 1989 (age 37)
- Place of birth: Hưng Nguyên, Nghệ An, Vietnam
- Height: 1.67 m (5 ft 6 in)
- Position: Right back

Team information
- Current team: Bắc Ninh
- Number: 11

Youth career
- 2008–2010: Sông Lam Nghệ An

Senior career*
Years	Team	Apps	(Gls)
2011–2014	Sông Lam Nghệ An	64	(2)
2014–2016	Becamex Bình Dương	66	(1)
2017–2018	Hồ Chí Minh City	47	(0)
2019–2020	SHB Đà Nẵng	11	(0)
2021	Hải Phòng	0	(0)
2024	Bắc Ninh		

International career^{‡}
2011–2012	Vietnam U23	23	(2)
2012–2018	Vietnam	21	(0)
- * Club domestic league appearances and goals as of 3 June 2021 ‡ National team caps and goals as of 1 October 2017

Âu Văn Hoàn (born 1 October 1989 in Nghệ An) is a Vietnamese footballer who plays as a right back for Bắc Ninh. He formerly played for other teams including SHB Đà Nẵng, Hồ Chí Minh City, Hải Phòng and the Vietnam national team. Văn Hoàn is part of Vietnam's Christian minority.

== Honours ==
=== Club ===
Sông Lam Nghệ An

- V.League 1:

(gold) Winners : 2011

Becamex Bình Dương

- V.League 1:

(gold) Winners : 2014, 2015

- Vietnamese National Cup

(gold) Winners : 2015
(silver) Runners-up :2014

- Vietnamese Super Cup

(gold) Winners : 2014, 2015

- Mekong Club Championship

(gold) Winners : 2014

=== International ===
Vietnam

- AFF Championship

Semi-finalists : 2016

- AYA Bank Cup

(gold) Winners :: 2016
