= Moe Win (footballer) =

Burmese footballer

Personal information
- Date of birth: March 30, 1988 (age 38)
- Height: 1.80 m (5 ft 11 in)
- Position: Defender

Senior career*
Years	Team	Apps	(Gls)
2004–2008	Ministry of Commerce		
2008–2010	Kanbawza		
2010–2014	Nay Pyi Taw		
2015–2016	Ayeyawady United		

International career
2006–2012	Myanmar	36	(1)
- * Club domestic league appearances and goals

Moe Win (born 30 March 1988) is a footballer from Myanmar, who currently plays for Nay Pyi Taw F.C. He made his first appearance for the Myanmar national football team in 2006.

== International ==
In 2007, He represent the Myanmar U-23 to The Final of 2007 SEA Games. But Cruised Thailad U-23. so Myanmar only get silver medal.
