= Manolom Phomsouvanh =

Laotian footballer

Personal information
- Full name: Manolom Phomsouvanh
- Date of birth: 26 September 1992 (age 34)
- Place of birth: Laos
- Height: 1.64 m (5 ft 4 1/2 in)
- Position: Midfielder

Team information
- Current team: Lao Toyota F.C.
- Number: 27

Senior career*
Years	Team	Apps	(Gls)
2010–2011	Ezra FC	18	(3)
2011–2013	Nong Khai	42	(2)
2014	Loei City	5	(3)
2015	Lanexang United		
2016–	Lao Toyota F.C.		

International career^{‡}
2010–2016	Laos	25	(2)
- * Club domestic league appearances and goals as of June 07, 2014 ‡ National team caps and goals as of September 06, 2016

Manolom Phomsouvanh (born in September 26, 1992) is a Laotian footballer who plays for Loei City in Thai Regional League Division 2.

He is a member of the Laos national team. He was selected to the team for the 2014 FIFA World Cup qualification, where his first appearance came in a 2-4 loss against Cambodia.
