= Lamnao Singto =

Laotian footballer

Personal information
- Full name: Lamnao Singto
- Date of birth: 15 April 1988 (age 38)
- Place of birth: Luang Prabang, Laos
- Height: 1.69 m (5 ft 6 1/2 in)
- Position: Forward

Team information
- Current team: Muanghat United (Head Coach)

Youth career
- Ministry of Public Works and Transport

Senior career*
Years	Team	Apps	(Gls)
2006	YOTHA FC (MCTPC FC)	33	(29)
2007	Kasetsart	18	(6)
2008	Rajpracha	28	(11)
2009	PEA	11	(0)
2010–2013	YOTHA FC (MCTPC FC)	15	(8)
Total		105	(54)

International career
2007–2011	Laos U23	13	(10)
2004–2012	Laos	20	(6)

Managerial career
- 2014: Laos (Assistant)
- 2022–: Muanghat United
- * Club domestic league appearances and goals as of 3 May 2009

Lamnao Singto (Lao: ລຳເນາ ສິງໂຕ) born 15 April 1988 in Luang Prabang, is a Laotian former football player. He played for several clubs in Thailand, including the Provincial Electricity Authority (now known as Buriram United), but he is best known for his time with YOTHA FC (MCTPC FC) in the Lao Premier League.

He retired in 2013 and became a coach, assisting Dave Booth in the 2014 AFF Championship.

He featured in Beerlao's advertisement for the 2009 Southeast Asian Games, which was held in Vientiane.

== International career ==
=== International goals ===
Scores and results list Laos' goal tally first.

No	Date	Venue	Opponent	Score	Result	Competition
1.	23 October 2008	Phnom Penh Olympic Stadium, Phnom Penh, Cambodia	Brunei	2–2	3–2	2008 AFF Championship qualification
2.	25 October 2008	Phnom Penh Olympic Stadium, Phnom Penh, Cambodia	Timor-Leste	1–0	2–1	2008 AFF Championship qualification
3.	26 October 2010	New Laos National Stadium, Vientiane, Laos	Timor-Leste	3–1	6–1	2010 AFF Championship qualification
4.	7 December 2010	Jalak Harupat Soreang Stadium, Soreang, Indonesia	Malaysia	1–1	1–5	2010 AFF Championship
5.	3 July 2011	New Laos National Stadium, Vientiane, Laos	Cambodia	1–0	6–2	2014 FIFA World Cup qualification
6.	3 July 2011	New Laos National Stadium, Vientiane, Laos	Cambodia	4–1	6–2	2014 FIFA World Cup qualification
