= Football at the 2013 Islamic Solidarity Games – Men's team squads =

The following is a list of squads for each nation competing in men's football at the 2013 Islamic Solidarity Games in Palembang, South Sumatra. Each nation could submit a squad of 23 players, 20 of whom had to be born on or after 1 January 1990, and three of whom could be overage players. A minimum of two goalkeepers (plus one optional dispensation goalkeeper) must be included in the squad.

== Group A ==
=== Iraq ===
Coach: Hadi Mutanash

No.	Pos.	Player	Date of birth (age)	Caps	Goals	Club
	GK	Haidar Raad	27 April 1991 (aged 22)	2	0	(Iraq Football Association) Duhok
	GK	Mohanad Qassim	1 July 1990 (aged 23)	1	0	(Iraq Football Association) Baghdad
	GK	Karrar Ibrahim	19 September 1994 (aged 19)	0	0	(Iraq Football Association) Al-Minaa
	DF	Sameh Saeed	26 May 1992 (aged 21)	3	0	(Iraq Football Association) Baghdad
	DF	Ashraf Abdul-Karim	7 July 1991 (aged 22)	1	0	(Iraq Football Association) Al-Zawraa
	DF	Ahmad Mohammed	10 March 1994 (aged 19)	3	0	(Iraq Football Association) Al-Quwa Al-Jawiya
	DF	Ammar Kadhim	2 December 1992 (aged 20)	0	0	(Iraq Football Association) Al-Sinaa
	DF	Mohammed Hadi Mutanash	1 January 1992 (aged 21)	2	0	(Iraq Football Association) Al-Kahraba
	DF	Ahmad Jabbar	19 February 1992 (aged 21)	0	0	(Iraq Football Association) Duhok
	DF	Abbas Qasim	15 January 1991 (aged 22)	5	0	(Iraq Football Association) Baghdad
	MF	Hussein Abdul-Wahed (Captain)	28 February 1985 (aged 28)	3	0	(Iraq Football Association) Al-Shorta
	MF	Ahmad Fadhel	1 January 1992 (aged 21)	4	0	(Iraq Football Association) Al-Shorta
	MF	Amjad Waleed	9 November 1993 (aged 19)	3	1	(Iraq Football Association) Al-Zawraa
	MF	Ahmad Abdul-Jabbar	14 May 1991 (aged 22)	3	0	(Iraq Football Association) Al-Zawraa
	MF	Ali Husni	23 May 1994 (aged 19)	1	0	(Iraq Football Association) Al-Minaa
	MF	Ahmad Issa		1	0	(Iraq Football Association) Al-Kahraba
	FW	Luay Salah	7 February 1982 (aged 31)	3	1	(Iraq Football Association) Erbil
	FW	Amjad Kalaf	20 March 1991 (aged 22)	2	2	(Iraq Football Association) Al-Shorta
	FW	Marwan Abbas Fadhel	1 July 1989 (aged 24)	3	0	(Iraq Football Association) Baghdad
	FW	Mustafa Jawda	1 July 1992 (aged 21)	2	0	(Iraq Football Association) Al-Kahraba
	FW	Bassim Ali	23 January 1995 (aged 18)	2	0	(Iraq Football Association) Naft Al-Janoob

=== Saudi Arabia ===
Coach:

=== Syria ===
Coach: Anas Maklouf

=== Turkey ===
Coach: Ersoy Sandalcı

No.	Pos.	Player	Date of birth (age)	Caps	Goals	Club
	GK	Cantuğ Temel	10 June 1994 (aged 19)			(Turkish Football Federation) İstanbul Güngörenspor
	GK	Göktuğ Yapıcı	16 March 1992 (aged 21)			(Turkish Football Federation) Erdekspor
	GK	Hayrullah Mert Akyüz	2 October 1993 (aged 19)			(Turkish Football Federation) Payas Belediyespor
	DF	Abdurrahman Ayhanoğlu	20 January 1994 (aged 19)			(Turkish Football Federation) Denizlispor
	DF	Ali Say	21 July 1993 (aged 20)			(Turkish Football Federation) Karşıyaka S.K.
	DF	Cebrail Karayel	15 August 1994 (aged 19)			(Turkish Football Federation) Adliyespor
	DF	Fatih Soyatık	1 January 1994 (aged 19)			(Turkish Football Federation) Denizlispor
	DF	İbrahim Hırçın	20 October 1992 (aged 20)			(Turkish Football Federation) Turgutluspor
	DF	Mehmet Taşçı	4 February 1992 (aged 21)			(Turkish Football Federation) MKE Ankaragücü
	DF	Orkun Dervişler	7 August 1991 (aged 22)			(Turkish Football Federation) Beylerbeyi S.K.
	DF	Rasimcan Değirmenci	15 September 1992 (aged 21)			(Turkish Football Federation) Ofspor
	DF	Uğur Balkanlı	20 February 1992 (aged 21)			(Turkish Football Federation) Ramispor
	MF	Ahmet Güney	27 June 1993 (aged 20)			(Turkish Football Federation) Sivasspor
	MF	Emre Akbaba	4 October 1992 (aged 20)			(Turkish Football Federation) Alanyaspor
	MF	Erdi Güncan	15 June 1994 (aged 19)			(Turkish Football Federation) İstanbulspor A.Ş.
	MF	Halil İbrahim Tuna	9 April 1993 (aged 20)			(Turkish Football Federation) Altınordu S.K.
	MF	Okan Baydemir	26 March 1990 (aged 23)			(Turkish Football Federation) Tuzlaspor
	MF	Ömerül Faruk İşler	1 June 1994 (aged 19)			(Turkish Football Federation) Ümraniyespor
	MF	Ozan Arif Önal	17 December 1993 (aged 19)			(Turkish Football Federation) Erzurum BB Spor
	MF	Samet Katanalp	25 February 1992 (aged 21)			(Turkish Football Federation) Bugsaşspor
	FW	Ahmet Dereli	22 October 1992 (aged 20)			(Turkish Football Federation) Adanaspor
	FW	Melih Rahman Nişancı	9 August 1994 (aged 19)			(Turkish Football Federation) Sarıyerspor
	FW	Oğuzhan Durmuş Çeşmeli	21 January 1993 (aged 20)			(Turkish Football Federation) Batman Petrolspor
	FW	Yakup Alkan	3 March 1992 (aged 21)			(Turkish Football Federation) Tuzlaspor

== Group B ==
=== Indonesia ===
Coach: Rahmad Darmawan

No.	Pos.	Player	Date of birth (age)	Caps	Goals	Club
1	GK	Kurnia Meiga (captain)	7 May 1990 (aged 23)	15	0	(Football Association of Indonesia) Arema Indonesia
12	GK	Shahar Ginanjar	4 November 1990 (aged 22)	1	0	(Football Association of Indonesia) Persib Bandung
22	GK	Andritany Ardhiyasa	26 December 1991 (aged 21)	5	0	(Football Association of Indonesia) Persija Jakarta
2	DF	Seftia Hadi	26 September 1991 (aged 21)	9	1	(Football Association of Indonesia) Mitra Kukar
3	DF	Syahrizal Syahbuddin	2 October 1993 (aged 19)	1	0	(Football Association of Indonesia) Persija Jakarta
4	DF	Johan Alfarizi	25 May 1990 (aged 23)	2	0	(Football Association of Indonesia) Persija Jakarta
5	DF	Alfin Tuasalamony	13 November 1992 (aged 20)	1	0	Unattached
16	DF	Diego Michiels	8 August 1990 (aged 23)	9	0	(Football Association of Indonesia) Sriwijaya
19	DF	Andri Ibo	3 April 1990 (aged 23)	1	1	(Football Association of Indonesia) Persidafon Dafonsoro
7	MF	Ramdhani Lestaluhu	5 November 1991 (aged 21)	6	1	(Football Association of Indonesia) Sriwijaya
8	MF	Fandi Eko Utomo	2 March 1991 (aged 22)	6	0	(Football Association of Indonesia) Persela Lamongan
10	MF	Oktovianus Maniani	27 October 1990 (aged 22)	10	0	(Football Association of Indonesia) Barito Putera
11	MF	Dedi Kusnandar	23 July 1991 (aged 22)	2	0	(Football Association of Indonesia) Arema Indonesia
13	MF	Manahati Lestusen	17 December 1993 (aged 19)	2	0	Unattached
14	MF	Rasyid Bakri	17 January 1991 (aged 22)	8	0	(Football Association of Indonesia) PSM Makassar
15	MF	Sunarto	18 May 1990 (aged 23)	1	0	(Football Association of Indonesia) Arema Indonesia
17	MF	Syahroni	10 August 1992 (aged 21)	7	0	(Football Association of Indonesia) Persija Jakarta
20	MF	David Laly	7 November 1991 (aged 21)	3	0	(Football Association of Indonesia) Persidafon Dafonsoro
21	MF	Andik Vermansyah	23 November 1991 (aged 21)	12	1	(Football Association of Indonesia) Persebaya 1927
23	MF	Bayu Gatra	12 November 1991 (aged 21)	1	0	(Football Association of Indonesia) Persisam Putra Samarinda
6	FW	Syamsir Alam	6 July 1992 (aged 21)	2	1	(United States Soccer Federation) D.C. United
9	FW	Aldaier Makatindu	25 May 1992 (aged 21)	1	0	(Football Association of Indonesia) Persisam Putra Samarinda
18	FW	Agung Supriyanto	14 June 1992 (aged 21)	7	3	(Football Association of Indonesia) Persijap Jepara

=== Morocco ===
Coach: Hassan Benabicha

No.	Pos.	Player	Date of birth (age)	Caps	Goals	Club
1	GK	Adnan El Assimi	8 January 1993 (aged 20)			(Royal Moroccan Football Federation) AMF
18	GK	Mehdi El Jourbaoui	6 January 1993 (aged 20)			(Royal Moroccan Football Federation) FAR Rabat
2	DF	Mohamed Chibi	21 January 1993 (aged 20)			(Royal Moroccan Football Federation) Raja Casablanca
	DF	Ali Rachdi	23 January 1993 (aged 20)			(Royal Moroccan Football Federation) Wydad Casablanca
	MF	Mohamed El Herouali	1 January 1994 (aged 19)			(Royal Moroccan Football Federation) Raja Casablanca
	DF	Ayoub Qasmi	19 September 1993 (aged 20)			(Royal Moroccan Football Federation) Wydad Casablanca
	DF	Mohamed Saidi	14 October 1994 (aged 18)			(Royal Moroccan Football Federation) AMF
	MF	Amine Dinar	13 June 1995 (aged 18)			(Royal Moroccan Football Federation) FAR Rabat
	DF	Badr Banoun	30 September 1993 (aged 19)			(Royal Moroccan Football Federation) Raja Casablanca
	DF	Youssef Jamaoui	29 April 1993 (aged 20)			(Royal Moroccan Football Federation) OC Khouribga
		Youssef El Jaaoui				(Royal Moroccan Football Federation) FAR Rabat
	MF	Bouazza Bouden	25 March 1993 (aged 20)			(Royal Moroccan Football Federation) Wydad Casablanca
	MF	Walid El Karti	23 July 1994 (aged 19)			(Royal Moroccan Football Federation) OC Khouribga
	MF	Anas El Asbahi	15 October 1993 (aged 19)			(Royal Moroccan Football Federation) Wydad Casablanca
	GK	Badreddine Benachour	2 July 1994 (aged 19)			(Royal Moroccan Football Federation) Wydad Casablanca
	MF	Reda El Neouali	20 July 1994 (aged 19)			(Royal Moroccan Football Federation) AMF
	MF	Omar Ati Allah	28 March 1994 (aged 19)			(Royal Moroccan Football Federation) Wydad Casablanca
	FW	Adam Ennafati	29 June 1994 (aged 19)			(French Football Federation) Lille OSC
	MF	Youssef Essaiydy	16 August 1994 (aged 19)			(Royal Moroccan Football Federation) AMF
	FW	Soufiane Bahja	24 July 1993 (aged 20)			(Royal Moroccan Football Federation) Kawkab Marrakech
	MF	Ayoub Bouchta	3 December 1993 (aged 19)			(Royal Moroccan Football Federation) Raja Casablanca
	FW	Yassine Othmane	23 January 1993 (aged 20)			(Royal Moroccan Football Federation) Wydad Casablanca
	FW	Adnan El Ouardi	28 February 1994 (aged 19)			(Royal Moroccan Football Federation) Wydad de Fès
	FW	Abdelkabir El Ouadi	20 February 1993 (aged 20)			(Royal Moroccan Football Federation) Wydad de Fès
	MF	Hamza Hafidi	9 February 1993 (aged 20)			(French Football Federation) SCO Angers

=== Palestine ===
Coach: Firas Aburadwan
