= Lestaluhu =

Lestaluhu is a Moluccan surname. Notable people with the surname include:

- Abduh Lestaluhu (born 1993), Indonesian footballer
- Abdul Lestaluhu (born 1993), Indonesian footballer
- Anan Lestaluhu (born 1999), Indonesian footballer
- Irsan Lestaluhu (born 1999), Indonesian footballer
- Pandi Lestaluhu (born 1997), Indonesian footballer
- Rafid Lestaluhu (born 1993), Indonesian footballer
- Ramdani Lestaluhu (born 1991), Indonesian footballer
- Syafril Lestaluhu (born 1998), Indonesian footballer
