= 2013 MNC Cup =

2013 Media Nusantara Citra Cup
Tournament details
- Host country: INDONESIA
- Dates: 21 November – 24 November
- Teams: 4 (from 2 confederations)
- Venue: 1 (in 1 host city)

Final positions
- Champions: Indonesia (1st title)
- Runners-up: Laos
- Third place: Maldives
- Fourth place: Papua New Guinea

Tournament statistics
- Matches played: 6
- Goals scored: 20 (3.33 per match)
- Top scorer(s): (Indonesia) Andik Vermansyah (Indonesia) Dendi Santoso (Indonesia) Yandi Sofyan (Laos) Khonesavanh Sihavong (Maldives) Ali Fasir (2 goals each)

The 2013 MNC Cup was held from 21 November to 24 November 2013, hosted by Indonesia. This tournament is intended for players under the age of 23 years (maximum birth 1 January 1990), but each team can register three players aged over 23 years.

== Participating teams ==
- Indonesia
- Laos
- Maldives
- Papua New Guinea

== Venues ==
Jakarta
Gelora Bung Karno Stadium
6°13′7″S 106°48′9″E
Capacity: 88,083
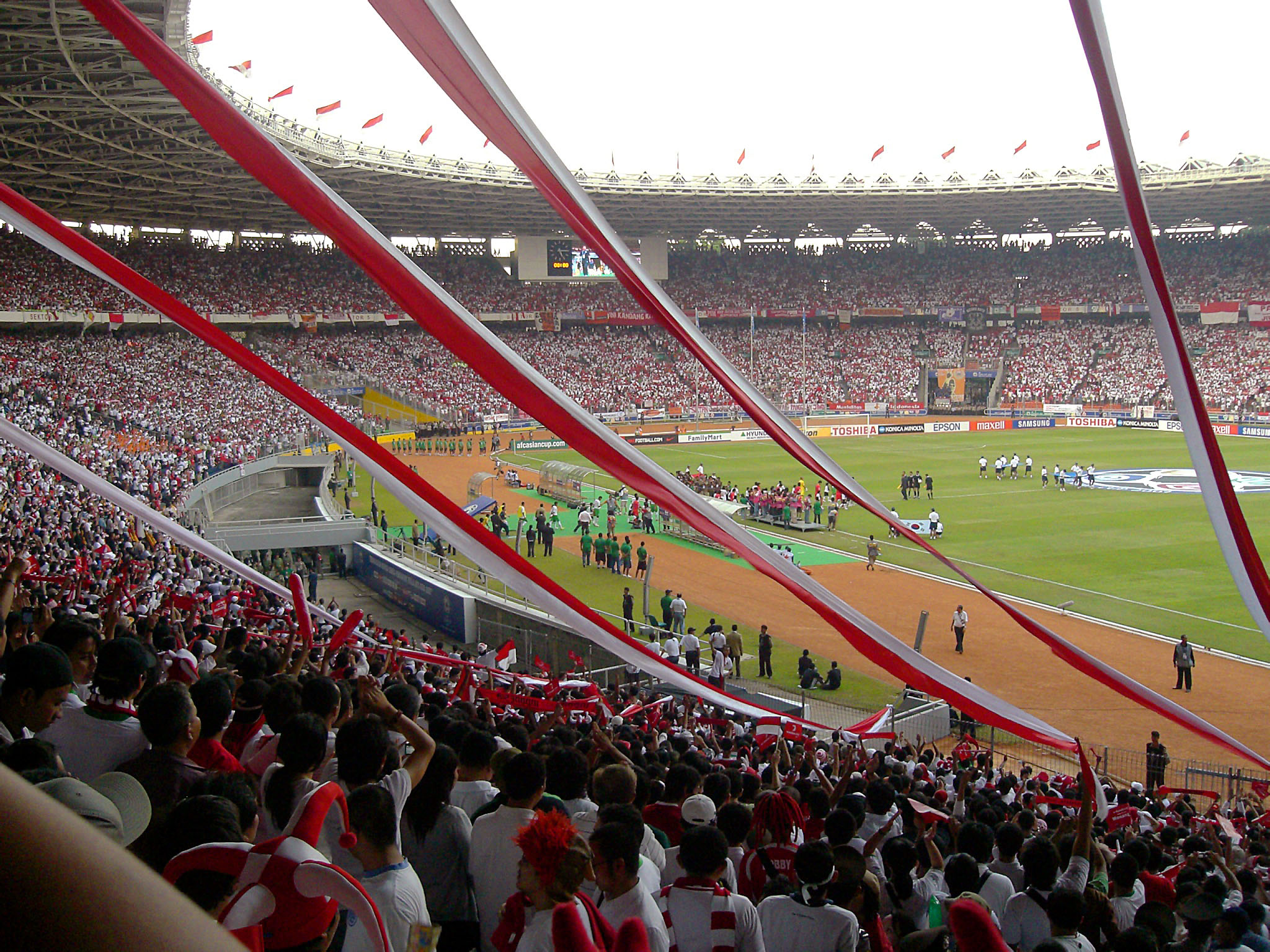

== Table and results ==
All times are West Indonesian Time (WIB) – UTC+7.

Key to colours in group tables
Champions of tournament

Team	Pld	W	D	L	GF	GA	GD	Pts
Indonesia	3	3	0	0	11	1	+10	9
Laos	3	2	0	1	5	5	0	6
Maldives	3	1	0	2	3	4	−1	3
Papua New Guinea	3	0	0	3	1	10	−9	0

21 November 2013
15:00

Papua New Guinea	0–1	Maldives
	Report	Fasir 40'

Gelora Bung Karno Stadium, Jakarta
Referee: Oki Dwi Putra (Indonesia)
21 November 2013
19:30

Indonesia	3–0	Laos
Ramdani 43'; Andik 73'; Alfin 77'	Report

Gelora Bung Karno Stadium, Jakarta
Referee: Thoriq Alkatiri (Indonesia)

22 November 2013
15:15

Laos	2–1	Maldives
Phoutthasay 33'; Phouthone 66'	Report	Akram 90'

Gelora Bung Karno Stadium, Jakarta
22 November 2013
19:30

Papua New Guinea	0–6	Indonesia
	Report	Dendi 19'; Yandi 38', 65'; Andik 53'; Bayu 72'; Roni 80'

Gelora Bung Karno Stadium, Jakarta
Referee: Hadiyana (Indonesia)

24 November 2013
15:15

Laos	3–1	Papua New Guinea
Khonesavanh 35', 37'; Vilayuth 88'	Report	Conn 76'

Gelora Bung Karno Stadium, Jakarta
24 November 2013
19:30

Indonesia	2–1	Maldives
Pahabol 22'; Dendi 77'	Report	Fasir 12'

Gelora Bung Karno Stadium, Jakarta

== Winner ==
2013 MNC Cup Winners
(Indonesia)
Indonesia
First title

== Goalscorers ==
2 goals

- (Indonesia) Andik Vermansyah
- (Indonesia) Dendi Santoso
- (Indonesia) Yandi Sofyan
- (Laos) Khonesavanh Sihavong
- (Maldives) Ali Fasir

1 goal

- (Indonesia) Alfin Tuasalamony
- (Indonesia) Bayu Gatra
- (Indonesia) Ramdani Lestaluhu
- (Indonesia) Roni Beroperay
- (Laos) Phouthone Innalay
- (Laos) Phoutthasay Khochalern
- (Laos) Vilayuth Sayyabounsou
- (Maldives) Akram Abdul Ghanee
- (Papua New Guinea) Ronald Conn
