= Diego Michiels =

Indonesian footballer

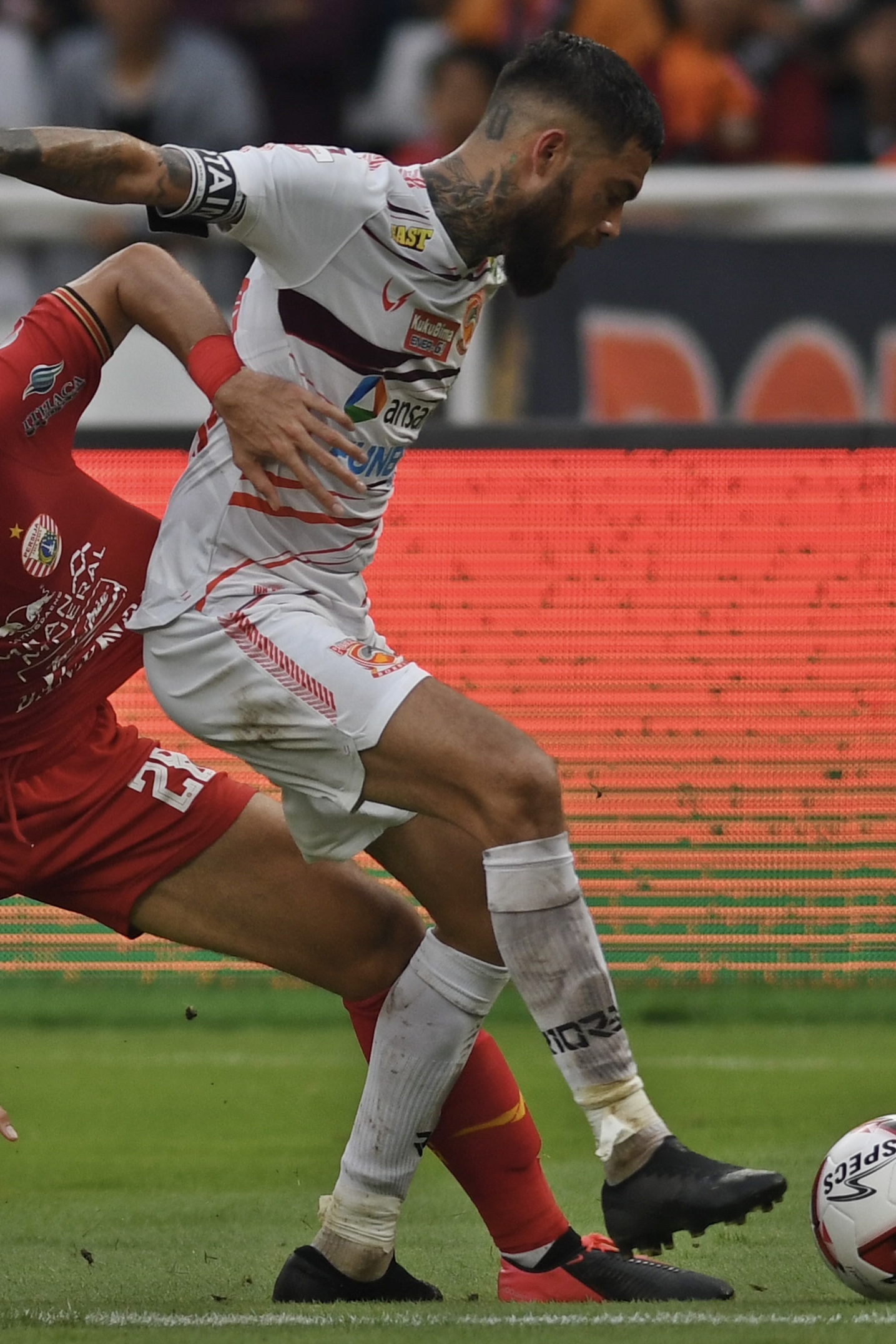
- Michiels playing for Borneo in 2020

Personal information
- Full name: Diego Muhammad bin Robbie Michiels
- Birth name: Diego Robbie Michiels
- Date of birth: 8 August 1990 (age 36)
- Place of birth: Deventer, Netherlands
- Height: 1.83 m (6 ft 0 in)
- Position: Defender

Team information
- Current team: Borneo Samarinda
- Number: 24

Youth career
- 1998: DVV Labor
- 2001: DVV RDC
- 2001–2009: Go Ahead Eagles

Senior career*
Years	Team	Apps	(Gls)
2009–2011	Go Ahead Eagles	17	(0)
2011	Pelita Jaya	2	(0)
2011	Jakarta FC 1928	12	(0)
2012	→ Arema Indonesia (loan)	18	(0)
2013–2014	Sriwijaya	11	(0)
2014–2015	Mitra Kukar	26	(1)
2015–2021	Borneo	75	(1)
2021–2022	Arema	18	(0)
2022–	Borneo Samarinda	72	(2)

International career
2011–2013	Indonesia U23	16	(0)
2012–2014	Indonesia	3	(0)
Medal record
Men's football
Representing Indonesia
Islamic Solidarity Games
Silver medal – second place	2013 Palembang	Team
Southeast Asian Games
Silver medal – second place	2011 Jakarta-Palembang	Team
Silver medal – second place	2013 Naypyidaw	Team
- * Club domestic league appearances and goals as of 23 May 2026

Diego Muhammad bin Robbie Michiels or Diego Michiels (born 8 August 1990) is a professional footballer who plays as a defender for Super League club Borneo Samarinda. Born in the Netherlands, he represented the Indonesia national team.

== International career ==
Michiels was born in the Netherlands to an Indonesian father and Dutch mother. In 2011, he and Joey Suk were invited by the Indonesian Football Association to play for the Indonesia national under-23 football team in Jakarta. According to the newspaper report, he was interested in joining the Indonesian national team, even though he would have to give up his Dutch passport. Along with Joey and Ruben Wuarbanaran, he was able to play for Indonesia, making his full debut in 2014 FIFA World Cup qualification against Bahrain on 29 February 2012.

== Personal life ==
On November 9, 2012, Diego allegedly violated two criminal code articles on assault in a Jakarta nightclub and faced at least three months and twenty days in jail. On March 7, 2013, he was released from jail.

He converted to Islam in 2013 and took the Islamic name Diego Muhammad bin Robbie Michiels.

== Career statistics ==
=== Club ===
As of match played 23 May 2026

Club	Season	League		Cup (Note: Includes KNVB Cup, Piala Indonesia)		Continental (Note: Appearances in AFC Cup)		Other (Note: Appearances in Indonesia President's Cup)		Total	
Club	Season	Apps	Goals	Apps	Goals	Apps	Goals	Apps	Goals	Apps	Goals
Go Ahead Eagles	2009–10	12	0	0	0	—		—		12	0
Go Ahead Eagles	2010–11	5	0	1	0	—		—		6	0
Go Ahead Eagles	Total	17	0	1	0	—		—		18	0
Pelita Jaya	2011–12	2	0	0	0	0	0	0	0	2	0
Arema	2011–12	18	0	0	0	2	0	0	0	20	0
Sriwijaya	2013	11	0	0	0	0	0	0	0	11	0
Mitra Kukar	2014	24	0	0	0	0	0	0	0	24	0
Mitra Kukar	2015	2	1	0	0	0	0	0	0	2	1
Mitra Kukar	Total	26	1	0	0	2	0	0	0	26	1
Borneo	2016	21	0	0	0	0	0	0	0	21	0
Borneo	2017	16	1	0	0	0	0	4	0	20	1
Borneo	2018	25	0	0	0	0	0	0	0	25	0
Borneo	2019	11	0	5	0	0	0	3	0	19	0
Borneo	2020	2	0	0	0	0	0	—		2	0
Borneo	2021	0	0	0	0	—		1 (Note: Appearances in Menpora Cup)	0	1	0
Borneo	Total	75	1	0	0	0	0	8	0	88	1
Arema	2021–22	18	0	0	0	0	0	0	0	18	0
Borneo	2022–23	24	1	0	0	0	0	6	1	30	2
Borneo	2023–24	30	1	0	0	0	0	0	0	30	1
Borneo	2024–25	11	0	0	0	–		0	0	11	0
Borneo	2025–26	7	0	0	0	–		0	0	7	0
Career total		221	4	6	0	2	0	14	1	243	5

=== International ===
As of match played 11 December 2014

Indonesia national team
Year	Apps	Goals
2012	2	0
2013	0	0
2014	1	0
Total	3	0

== Honours ==
Borneo

- Piala Presiden runner-up: 2017, 2022, 2024

Indonesia U-23

- SEA Games silver medal: 2011, 2013
- Islamic Solidarity Games silver medal: 2013

== See also ==
- List of Indonesia international footballers born outside Indonesia
