= Agung Supriyanto =

Indonesian association footballer

Personal information
- Full name: Agung Supriyanto
- Date of birth: 14 June 1992 (age 34)
- Place of birth: Jepara, Indonesia
- Height: 1.78 m (5 ft 10 in)
- Position: Forward

Youth career
- 2009–2011: Persijap Jepara

Senior career*
Years	Team	Apps	(Gls)
2011–2012	PPSM Kartika Nusantara	16	(0)
2012–2013	Persijap Jepara	20	(6)
2014	Persija Jakarta	6	(1)
2015–2016	Persebaya Bhayangkara	0	(0)
2016	Persijap Jepara	12	(3)
2017	Madura	4	(0)
2017	Persis Solo	6	(1)
2018	Persibat Batang	12	(0)
2019	Perserang Serang	19	(4)
2020	Putra Sinar Giri	0	(0)
2021–2024	Persekat Tegal	30	(7)
2021	→ PSMS Medan (loan)	3	(0)
2024–2025	RANS Nusantara	17	(1)

International career^{‡}
2012–2014	Indonesia U23	8	(3)
2013	Indonesia	1	(0)
Medal record
Men's football
Representing Indonesia
Islamic Solidarity Games
Silver medal – second place	2013 Palembang	Team
- * Club domestic league appearances and goals as of 25 February 2025 ‡ National team caps and goals as of 9 September 2013

Agung Supriyanto (born 14 June 1992 in Jepara, Central Java) is an Indonesian professional footballer who plays as a forward.

== Personal life ==
Supriyanto was born on 14 June 1992. He enlisted in the Army through special selection on sport after graduating from highschool.

Per January 2015, he is a second sergeant in the Indonesian Army's military police.

He claimed that his main profession is a soldier and football is only a hobby.

== Career ==
=== Club ===
Supriyanto played for PPSM Kartika Nusantara Magelang after graduating from army training for 18 month.

In September 2014, while Supriyanto was still contracted to Persija, he played for internal amateur competition in Indonesian Armed Forces, Piala TNI 2014, for his own branch team PSAD (Army football club) and won the cup.

On 25 December 2014, he was announced as a Persebaya Bhayangkara player.

=== International ===
During his time at PPSM KN Magelang, Supriyanto played for Indonesia U-22 in Asian Cup U-22 qualification.

He made his international debut for the Indonesia national team in 2013.

=== International goals ===
Agung Supriyanto: International under-23 goals

Goal	Date	Venue	Opponent	Score	Result	Competition
1	7 July 2012	Riau Main Stadium, Pekanbaru, Indonesia	Timor-Leste U-23	2–0	2–0	2013 AFC U-22 Championship qualification
2	15 July 2012	Riau Main Stadium, Pekanbaru, Indonesia	Singapore U-23	1–0	2–0	2013 AFC U-22 Championship qualification
3	15 July 2012	Riau Main Stadium, Pekanbaru, Indonesia	Singapore U-23	2–0	2–0	2013 AFC U-22 Championship qualification

== Honours ==
=== International ===
Indonesia U-23

- Islamic Solidarity Games (silver) Silver medal: 2013
