= Syamsir Alam =

Indonesian footballer

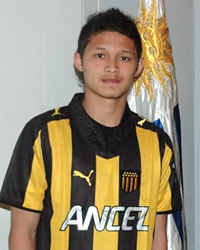
- Alam with Peñarol in 2009

Personal information
- Full name: Syamsir Alam
- Date of birth: 6 July 1992 (age 34)
- Place of birth: Agam, Indonesia
- Height: 1.78 m (5 ft 10 in)
- Position: Forward

Youth career
- 2008–2009: Deportivo Indonesia
- 2009–2010: Peñarol

Senior career*
Years	Team	Apps	(Gls)
2011–2013	Vise	10	(0)
2013	→ D.C. United (loan)	0	(0)
2013–2014	Sriwijaya	6	(0)
2015	Pelita Bandung Raya	0	(0)
2016	Persiba Balikpapan	9	(0)
2021–2022	RANS Nusantara	1	(0)
Total		26	(0)

International career
2003	Indonesia U11		
2004	Indonesia U14		
2008	Indonesia U17		
2009	Indonesia U19	4	(4)
2011–2013	Indonesia U23	2	(1)
Medal record
Men's football
Representing Indonesia
Islamic Solidarity Games
Silver medal – second place	2013 Palembang	Team
- * Club domestic league appearances and goals as of 19:37, 16 November 2021 (UTC)

Syamsir Alam (born 6 July 1992 in Agam, Indonesia) is an Indonesian former footballer who plays as a forward.

== Club career ==
Born in Agam, Alam played youth football for Peñarol, Heerenveen and Vitesse Arnhem. After playing for Visé, he signed on loan for D.C. United. In 2014, he signed with Sriwijaya FC.

On 27 December 2014, he signed with Pelita Bandung Raya.

in early 2021, Alam returned to his career in football. he had decided to retire early at the age of 23 after the last time he defended the club Persiba Balikpapan. Alam then moved into the world of entertainment by hosting a TV show. But he expressed interest in returning to playing football. there are at least two figures who managed to persuade him to return to the world of football. namely Raffi Ahmad and Hamka Hamzah. they then convinced him to come back and try again his career in the world of football.

On 23 April 2021, Syamsir Alam signed a contract with Indonesian Liga 2 club RANS Cilegon.

== International career ==
He represented Indonesia on several occasions from the U-11 through the U-23.

== Career statistics ==
=== Club ===
As of match played 16 November 2021.

Club statistics
Club	Season	League		Cup (Note: Includes U.S. Open Cup)		Continental		Other		Total	
Club	Season	Apps	Goals	Apps	Goals	Apps	Goals	Apps	Goals	Apps	Goals
Visé	2011–12	5	0	0	0	–		0	0	5	0
Visé	2012–13	5	0	0	0	–		0	0	5	0
Visé	Total	10	0	0	0	–		0	0	10	0
D.C. United (loan)	2013	0	0	0	0	–		0	0	0	0
Sriwijaya	2014	6	0	0	0	–		0	0	6	0
Pelita Bandung Raya	2015	0	0	0	0	–		0	0	0	0
Persiba Balikpapan	2016	9	0	0	0	–		0	0	9	0
RANS Nusantara	2021	1	0	0	0	–		0	0	1	0
RANS Nusantara	2022–23	0	0	0	0	–		1 (Note: Appearances in Indonesia President's Cup)	0	1	0
Career total		26	0	0	0	0	0	1	0	27	0

=== International goals ===
Syamsir Alam: International under-19 goals

Goal	Date	Venue	Opponent	Score	Result	Competition
1	12 November 2009	Si Jalak Harupat Stadium, Bandung, Indonesia	Chinese Taipei U-19	0–2	0–6	2010 AFC U-19 Championship qualification
2	12 November 2009	Si Jalak Harupat Stadium, Bandung, Indonesia	Chinese Taipei U-19	0–4	0–6	2010 AFC U-19 Championship qualification
3	17 November 2009	Si Jalak Harupat Stadium, Bandung, Indonesia	Hong Kong U-19	0–1	1–4	2010 AFC U-19 Championship qualification
4	17 November 2009	Si Jalak Harupat Stadium, Bandung, Indonesia	Hong Kong U-19	0–2	1–4	2010 AFC U-19 Championship qualification

== Honours ==
=== Club ===
RANS Cilegon

- Liga 2 runner-up: 2021

=== International ===
Indonesia U-23

- Islamic Solidarity Games silver medal: 2013
