= Shahar Ginanjar =

Indonesian footballer

Personal information
- Full name: Shahar Ginanjar
- Date of birth: 4 November 1990 (age 36)
- Place of birth: Purwakarta, Indonesia
- Height: 6 ft 1 in (1.85 m)
- Position: Goalkeeper

Youth career
- 2005–2007: Persipo Purwakarta
- 2007–2008: Sawsco Bandung
- 2008–2011: Pelita Jaya U-21

Senior career*
Years	Team	Apps	(Gls)
2011–2012	Pelita Jaya	9	(0)
2012–2015	Persib Bandung	12	(0)
2015–2016	Mitra Kukar	17	(0)
2017	Barito Putera	9	(0)
2017–2018	PSM Makassar	2	(0)
2018	→ Persija Jakarta (loan)	10	(0)
2019–2021	Persija Jakarta	12	(0)
2021–2022	Dewa United	4	(0)
2022–2023	Borneo	1	(0)
2023–2024	Kalteng Putra	8	(0)
2025–2026	Pasuruan United	6	(0)

International career^{‡}
2013	Indonesia U23	1	(0)
Medal record
Men's football
Representing Indonesia
Islamic Solidarity Games
Silver medal – second place	2013 Palembang	Team
- * Club domestic league appearances and goals as of 21 January 2026 ‡ National team caps and goals as of 27 July 2018

Shahar Ginanjar (born 4 November 1990 in Purwakarta) is an Indonesian professional footballer who plays as a goalkeeper.

== Personal life ==
He got married on January 24, 2015.

== Club career ==
He extended his contract with Persib Bandung for two years on 27 November 2013.

== International career ==
He made his international debut with the Indonesia U-23 on 13 July 2013 against Singapore U-23 coming on as a substitute.

He called for the Indonesia against Malaysia on 14 September 2014, but did not play.

== Honours ==
=== Club ===
Pelita Jaya U-21

- Indonesia Super League U-21: 2008–09

Persib Bandung

- Indonesia Super League: 2014
- Piala Presiden: 2015

Mitra Kukar

- General Sudirman Cup: 2015

Persija Jakarta

- Liga 1: 2018
- Piala Indonesia runner-up: 2018–19

Dewa United

- Liga 2 third place (play-offs): 2021

Borneo Samarinda

- Piala Presiden runner-up: 2022

=== International ===
Indonesia U-23

- Islamic Solidarity Games silver medal: 2013
