= Syahroni =

Indonesian association footballer

Personal information
- Full name: Syahroni
- Date of birth: 10 August 1992 (age 34)
- Place of birth: Tangerang, Indonesia
- Height: 1.73 m (5 ft 8 in)
- Position: Midfielder

Youth career
- 2006–2008: Persita Tangerang

Senior career*
Years	Team	Apps	(Gls)
2008–2009	Persikota Tangerang	11	(1)
2010–2011	Tangerang Wolves	18	(1)
2011–2012	Persibo Bojonegoro	25	(5)
2013	Persija Jakarta	17	(0)
2014–2015	Barito Putera	20	(5)
2016	Persija Jakarta	14	(0)
2017	Barito Putera	15	(0)
2017–2018	Persela Lamongan	26	(1)
2019	Mitra Kukar	13	(1)
2020–2021	Persis Solo	0	(0)
2021	Persela Lamongan	10	(0)
2022	PSS Sleman	3	(0)
2022	PSKC Cimahi	5	(0)

International career^{‡}
2012–2014	Indonesia U23	8	(0)
Medal record
Men's football
Representing Indonesia
Islamic Solidarity Games
Silver medal – second place	2013 Palembang	Team
- * Club domestic league appearances and goals as of 21:10, 1 October 2022 (UTC) ‡ National team caps and goals as of 9 September 2012

Syahroni (born 10 August 1992) is an Indonesian professional footballer who plays as a midfielder.

== Club career ==
=== Mitra Kukar ===
In 2019, Syahroni signed a contract with Indonesian Liga 2 club Mitra Kukar.

=== Persis Solo ===
He was signed for Persis Solo to play in Liga 2 in the 2020 season. This season was suspended on 27 March 2020 due to the COVID-19 pandemic. The season was abandoned and was declared void on 20 January 2021.

=== Persela Lamongan ===
He was signed for Persela Lamongan to play in Liga 1 in the 2021 season. Syahroni made his debut on 4 September 2021 in a match against PSIS Semarang at the Wibawa Mukti Stadium, Cikarang.

=== PSS Sleman ===
In 2022, Syahroni signed a contract with Indonesian Liga 1 club PSS Sleman. He made his debut on 7 January 2022 in a 4–1 win against Persiraja Banda Aceh as a substitute for Misbakus Solikin in the 65th minute at the Ngurah Rai Stadium, Denpasar.

== Honours ==
=== Club ===
Persibo Bojonegoro

- Piala Indonesia: 2012

=== International ===
Indonesia U-23

- Islamic Solidarity Games silver medal: 2013
