= Rasyid Bakri =

Indonesian footballer

Personal information
- Full name: Rasyid Assyahid Bakri
- Date of birth: 17 January 1991 (age 35)
- Place of birth: Gowa, Indonesia
- Height: 5 ft 5 in (1.64 m)
- Position: Midfielder

Team information
- Current team: PSM Makassar
- Number: 17

Youth career
- 2001–2005: Makassar Football School
- 2006: PSM Makassar
- 2007–2010: Makassar United

Senior career*
Years	Team	Apps	(Gls)
2011–	PSM Makassar	178	(16)

International career
2012–2014	Indonesia U23	14	(0)
2012–2014	Indonesia	7	(0)
Medal record
Men's football
Representing Indonesia
Islamic Solidarity Games
Silver medal – second place	2013 Palembang	Team
- * Club domestic league appearances and goals as of 16 October 2026

Rasyid Assyahid Bakri (born in Gowa, Indonesia, 17 January 1991) is an Indonesian professional footballer who plays as a midfielder for Super League club PSM Makassar. In 2005, he played in Danone Nations Cup with Makassar Football School.

== International career ==
Bakri made his first international caps for Indonesia in a match against Singapore in the 2012 AFF Championship as substitute.

== Career statistics ==
=== International ===
As of match played 11 December 2014

Indonesia national team
Year	Apps	Goals
2012	4	0
2013	2	0
2014	1	0
Total	7	0

== Honours ==
=== Club ===
PSM Makassar

- Liga 1: 2022–23
- Piala Indonesia: 2018–19

=== International ===
Indonesia U-23

- Islamic Solidarity Games silver medal: 2013

=== Individual ===
- Indonesia Soccer Championship A Best XI: 2016
