= Seftia Hadi =

Indonesian footballer (born 1991)

Personal information
- Full name: Seftia Hadi
- Date of birth: 26 September 1991 (age 35)
- Place of birth: Deli Serdang, Indonesia
- Height: 1.82 m (6 ft 0 in)
- Position: Defender

Youth career
- PSMS Medan

Senior career*
Years	Team	Apps	(Gls)
2008–2009	PSMS Medan	4	(0)
2009–2011	PSPS Pekanbaru	10	(0)
2011–2012	Sriwijaya	14	(0)
2013	Mitra Kukar	14	(1)
2014–2015	Semen Padang	15	(1)
2016	Persip Pekalongan	9	(0)
2017	Mitra Kukar	6	(0)
2017	PS Barito Putera	0	(0)
2018	Aceh United	10	(0)
2018	Perserang Serang	5	(0)
2019–2020	PSCS Cilacap	8	(0)
Total		95	(2)

International career
2011–2013	Indonesia U23	9	(1)
Medal record
Men's football
Representing Indonesia
Islamic Solidarity Games
Silver medal – second place	2013 Palembang	Team
Southeast Asian Games
Silver medal – second place	2011 Jakarta-Palembang	Team
- * Club domestic league appearances and goals

Seftia Hadi (born on 26 September 1991), is an Indonesian former footballer who plays as a centre-back or left-back. He also has a curling free kick ability although he is a defender.

== Honours ==
Sriwijaya

- Indonesia Super League: 2011–12

Indonesia U-23

- SEA Games silver medal: 2011
- Islamic Solidarity Games silver medal: 2013

== International goals ==
Seftia Hadi: International under-23 goals

Goal	Date	Venue	Opponent	Score	Result	Competition
1	15 September 2011	Kowloon Bay Park, Kowloon, Hong Kong	Hong Kong U-23	0–3	0–4	Friendly
