= Andritany Ardhiyasa =

Indonesian footballer

- Andritany with Persija in 2025

Personal information
- Full name: Andritany Ardhiyasa
- Date of birth: 26 December 1991 (age 34)
- Place of birth: Jakarta, Indonesia
- Height: 1.78 m (5 ft 10 in)
- Position: Goalkeeper

Team information
- Current team: Persija Jakarta
- Number: 26

Youth career
- 2005: ASIOP Apacinti
- 2006–2008: SKO Ragunan
- 2006: → Persib Bandung (loan)
- 2007: → Pesik Kuningan (loan)

Senior career*
Years	Team	Apps	(Gls)
2009–2010	Sriwijaya	1	(0)
2010–	Persija Jakarta	272	(0)

International career
2003–2005	Indonesia U17	23	(0)
2008	Indonesia U18	5	(0)
2011–2014	Indonesia U23	10	(0)
2018	Indonesia Asian Games (O.P.)	5	(0)
2014–2019	Indonesia	17	(0)
Medal record
Men's football
Representing Indonesia
Islamic Solidarity Games
Silver medal – second place	2013 Palembang	Team
Southeast Asian Games
Silver medal – second place	2011 Jakarta-Palembang	Team
Silver medal – second place	2013 Naypyidaw	Team
AFF Championship
Runner-up	2016 Myanmar & Philippines	Team
- * Club domestic league appearances and goals as of 3 March 2026

Andritany Ardhiyasa (born 26 December 1991) is an Indonesian professional footballer who plays as a goalkeeper for Super League club Persija Jakarta. His older brother, Indra Kahfi was also a football player.

== Club career ==
=== Early career ===
In 2007, Andritany started his senior career with Pesik Kuningan.

In March 2009, he joined Sriwijaya FC as an emergency goalkeeper after all three of Sriwijaya's goalkeepers went out with injuries. He made his debut in January 2010 when Sriwijaya drew 1–1 with Persik Kediri.

=== Persija Jakarta ===
Andritany moved back to his birthplace Jakarta to serve as Persija Jakarta's third-choice goalkeeper after Hendro Kartiko and Jendri Pitoy in 2010.

In 2013, he was planned to be the first-choice goalkeeper by Persija's coach, Iwan Setiawan, but Persija's financial problem prevented him to play for Persija in the first half of the season. He only joined Persija in the second half of the season.

He stayed at the club in 2014 despite the club's recurring financial problem.

In 2018, Andritany brought the club to its first Liga 1 title, eleventh Indonesian title overall. Persija's defense, led by Andritany, only conceded 36 goals, the fewest among Liga 1 club for that season. He was named in the season best XI.

For the 2019 season, Andritany was chosen by Ismed Sofyan to succeed him as Persija's captain. He was chosen by Ismed because of his leadership skill.

Andritany served as Persija's captain until 2024 when he chose Rizky Ridho to succeed him as captain for the 2024–25 league season.

== Career statistics ==
=== Club ===
As of match played 3 March 2026

Appearances and goals by club, season and competition
Club	Season	League			Cup (Note: Includes Piala Indonesia)		Continental (Note: Appearances in AFC Cup, AFC Champions League)		Total	
Club	Season	Division	Apps	Goals	Apps	Goals	Apps	Goals	Apps	Goals
Sriwijaya	2009–10	ISL	1	0	–		–		1	0
Persija Jakarta
Persija Jakarta	2010–11	ISL	0	0	–		–		0	0
Persija Jakarta	2011–12	ISL	20	0	–		–		20	0
Persija Jakarta	2013	ISL	11	0	–		–		11	0
Persija Jakarta	2014	ISL	19	0	–		–		19	0
Persija Jakarta	2015	ISL	1	0	–		–		1	0
Persija Jakarta	2016	ISC A	22	0	–		–		22	0
Persija Jakarta	2017	Liga 1	33	0	–		–		33	0
Persija Jakarta	2018	Liga 1	19	0	1	0	6	0	26	0
Persija Jakarta	2019	Liga 1	23	0	3	0	7	0	31	0
Persija Jakarta	2020	Liga 1	2	0	–		–		2	0
Persija Jakarta	2021–22	Liga 1	28	0	–		–		28	0
Persija Jakarta	2022–23	Liga 1	34	0	–		–		34	0
Persija Jakarta	2023–24	Liga 1	32	0	–		–		32	0
Persija Jakarta	2024–25	Liga 1	19	0	–		–		19	0
Persija Jakarta	2025–26	Super League	8	0	–		–		8	0
Career Total			273	0	4	0	13	0	290	0

=== International ===
==== National team appearances ====
As of match played 10 September 2019

Appearances and goals by national team and year
National team	Year	Apps	Goals
Indonesia	2014	2	0
Indonesia	2015	0	0
Indonesia	2016	3	0
Indonesia	2017	2	0
Indonesia	2018	5	0
Indonesia	2019	5	0
Total		17	0

== Honours ==
=== Club ===
Persib Bandung U18

- Soeratin Cup: 2006

Sriwijaya

- Piala Indonesia: 2008–09, 2010

Persija Jakarta

- Liga 1: 2018
- Indonesia President's Cup: 2018
- Menpora Cup: 2021

=== International ===
Indonesia U-23

- SEA Games silver medal: 2011, 2013
- Islamic Solidarity Games silver medal: 2013

Indonesia

- AFF Championship runner-up: 2016
- Aceh World Solidarity Cup runner-up: 2017

=== Individual ===
- Liga 1 Team of the Season: 2017, 2018, 2022–23
- Menpora Cup Best Eleven: 2021

Preceded by Hansamu Yama	Indonesian Captain; 2018–2019	Succeeded by Evan Dimas
