= Andri Ibo =

Indonesian footballer (born 1990)

Personal information
- Full name: Andri Ibo
- Date of birth: 3 April 1990 (age 36)
- Place of birth: Sentani, Indonesia
- Height: 5 ft 8 in (1.73 m)
- Position: Defender

Youth career
- 2008–2009: Persidafon Dafonsoro

Senior career*
Years	Team	Apps	(Gls)
2009–2013	Persidafon Dafonsoro	57	(2)
2014–2018	Persipura Jayapura	26	(0)
2019	Barito Putera	12	(0)
2020–2022	Persik Kediri	17	(0)
2022–2023	Persis Solo	15	(0)
2023–2024	Persipura Jayapura	15	(0)

International career
2013	Indonesia U23	8	(2)
Medal record
Men's football
Representing Indonesia
Islamic Solidarity Games
Silver medal – second place	2013 Palembang	Team
Southeast Asian Games
Silver medal – second place	2013 Naypyidaw	Team
- * Club domestic league appearances and goals as of 3 February 2024

Andri Ibo (born 3 April 1990) is an Indonesian professional footballer who plays as a defender. His older brother Yohan Ibo is also professional footballer.

== Club career ==
=== Persipura Jayapura ===
In 2014, Ibo signed a contract with Indonesia Super League club Persipura Jayapura. He made his league debut on 1 February 2014 in a match against Persela Lamongan at the Mandala Stadium, Jayapura.

=== Barito Putera ===
In 2019, Andri Ibo signed a contract with Indonesian Liga 1 club Barito Putera. Ibo made his debut on 20 May 2019 in a match against Persija Jakarta at the 17th May Stadium, Banjarmasin.

=== Persik Kediri ===
He was signed for Persik Kediri to play in Liga 1 in the 2020 season. Ibo made his debut on 29 February 2020 in a match against Persebaya Surabaya at the Gelora Bung Tomo Stadium, Surabaya. This season was suspended on 27 March 2020 due to the COVID-19 pandemic. The season was abandoned and was declared void on 20 January 2021.

=== Persis Solo ===
Ibo was signed for Persis Solo to play in Liga 1 in the 2022–23 season. He made his league debut on 19 August 2022 in a match against Bhayangkara at the Wibawa Mukti Stadium, Cikarang.

== International career ==
He scored in his début match for Indonesia U-23 against Brunei U-23 on August 15, 2013.

=== International goals ===
Andri Ibo: International under-23 goals

Goal	Date	Venue	Opponent	Score	Result	Competition
1	15 August 2013	Maguwoharjo Stadium, Sleman, Indonesia	Brunei U-23	1–0	1–0	Friendly
2	12 December 2013	Thuwunna Stadium, Yangon, Myanmar	Thailand U-23	1–4	1–4	2013 SEA Games

== Honours ==
=== Club ===
Persipura Jayapura

- Indonesia Soccer Championship A: 2016

=== Country honors ===
Indonesia U-23

- SEA Games silver medal: 2013
- Islamic Solidarity Games silver medal: 2013

=== Individual ===
- Menpora Cup Best Eleven: 2021
