= Syahrizal Syahbuddin =

Indonesian footballer

Personal information
- Full name: Syahrizal Syahbuddin
- Date of birth: 2 October 1993 (age 33)
- Place of birth: Bireuën, Indonesia
- Height: 1.80 m (5 ft 11 in)
- Positions: Centre-back; right-back

Youth career
- 2008–2010: Escuela Empoli
- 2011: Sportivo Trinidense
- 2013: Persija U-21

Senior career*
Years	Team	Apps	(Gls)
2011	Atlántida	0	(0)
2012–2013	PSSB Bireun	26	(1)
2013–2014	Persija Jakarta	33	(0)
2015–2016	Mitra Kukar	6	(0)
2017	Celebest	6	(0)
2018	Aceh United	19	(1)
2021	PSPS Riau	9	(0)
2023–2024	PSAB Aceh Besar	4	(0)

International career
2013–2014	Indonesia U23	3	(0)
Medal record
Men's football
Representing Indonesia
Islamic Solidarity Games
Silver medal – second place	2013 Palembang	Team
Southeast Asian Games
Silver medal – second place	2013 Naypyidaw	Team
- * Club domestic league appearances and goals as of 23:14, 29 November 2021 (UTC)

Syahrizal Syahbuddin (born 2 October 1993), simply known as Syahrizal, is an Indonesian professional footballer who plays as a defender. He was the first Indonesian footballer to play in Paraguay.

== Club career ==
=== Mitra Kukar ===
In December 2014, he joined Mitra Kukar.

=== Celebest ===
In 2017, Syahrizal signed a contract with Indonesian Liga 2 club for the 2017 season.

=== Aceh United ===
He was signed for Aceh United to play in the Liga 2 in the 2018 season.

=== PSPS Riau ===
In 2021, Syahrizal signed a contract with Indonesian Liga 2 club PSPS Riau for the 2021 season. He made his league debut on 6 October against Semen Padang at the Gelora Sriwijaya Stadium, Palembang.

== International career ==
He made his debut for Indonesia under-23 national team in friendly match against Singapore U-23 on 13 July 2013 with score 1–0 for Singapore.

== Honours ==
Indonesia U-23

- SEA Games silver medal: 2013
- Islamic Solidarity Games silver medal: 2013
