= Manahati Lestusen =

Indonesian footballer

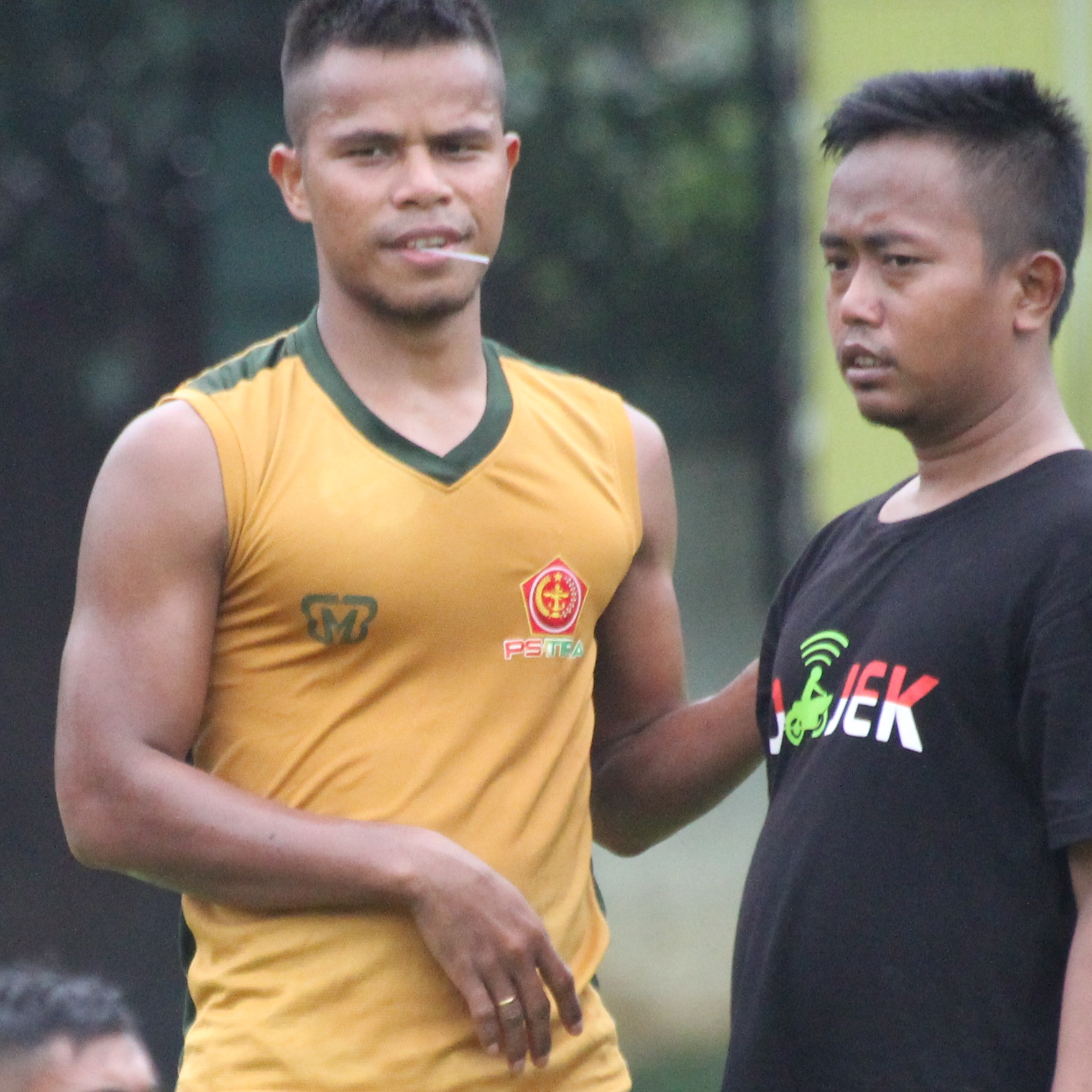
- Lestusen (yellow) and the kitman with Persikabo 1973 in 2018

Personal information
- Full name: Manahati Lestusen
- Date of birth: 17 December 1993 (age 32)
- Place of birth: South Buru, Indonesia
- Height: 1.68 m (5 ft 6 in)
- Positions: Defensive midfielder; defender

Team information
- Current team: PSMS Medan
- Number: 69

Youth career
- 2010–2012: Deportivo Indonesia
- 2012: → Peñarol (loan)

Senior career*
Years	Team	Apps	(Gls)
2012–2013	Visé	2	(0)
2014–2015	Bhayangkara	26	(0)
2015	Barito Putera	4	(0)
2016–2024	Persikabo 1973	158	(12)
2024–2026	Malut United	49	(0)
2026–	PSMS Medan	1	(0)

International career
2008	Indonesia U16	4	(0)
2009–2011	Indonesia U19	4	(0)
2013–2015	Indonesia U23	28	(2)
2014–2019	Indonesia	20	(2)
Medal record
Men's football
Representing Indonesia
Islamic Solidarity Games
Silver medal – second place	2013 Palembang	Team
Southeast Asian Games
Silver medal – second place	2013 Naypyidaw	Team
AFF Championship
Runner-up	2016 Myanmar & Philippines	Team
- * Club domestic league appearances and goals as of 23:14, 13 September 2026 (UTC)

Manahati Lestusen (born 17 December 1993 in Liang, South Buru) is an Indonesian professional footballer who plays for Championship club PSMS Medan. A versatile defensive player, Lestusen has been deployed as a defensive midfielder, a centre-back and a right-back.

== Personal life ==
Lestusen hails from Liang, South Buru and is the son of H. Muhabas Lestusen and Janiapari. He started playing football at the age of 13 and played every position on his school team. He is also a First Sergeant in the Army Military Police Corps (Indonesia).

== International career ==
Lestusen won his first cap for Indonesia in a friendly match against Andorra on 26 March 2014, replacing Rizky Pellu after 46 minutes.

== Career statistics ==
=== Club ===
As of match played 13 September 2026

Club statistics
Club	Season	League			Cup (Note: Includes Piala Indonesia)		Other (Note: Appearances in Indonesia President's Cup)		Total	
Club	Season	Division	Apps	Goals	Apps	Goals	Apps	Goals	Apps	Goals
Visé	2012–13	Belgian Second Division	2	0	0	0	0	0	2	0
Persebaya Bhayangkara	2014	Indonesia Super League	25	0	0	0	0	0	25	0
Barito Putera	2015	Indonesia Super League	3	0	0	0	0	0	3	0
Persikabo 1973	2016	ISC A	21	3	0	0	0	0	21	3
Persikabo 1973	2017	Liga 1	27	2	0	0	0	0	27	2
Persikabo 1973	2018	Liga 1	30	2	0	0	3	1	33	3
Persikabo 1973	2019	Liga 1	18	1	2	0	2	0	18	1
Persikabo 1973	2020	Liga 1	0	0	0	0	0	0	0	0
Persikabo 1973	2021–22	Liga 1	28	1	0	0	2 (Note: Appearances in Menpora Cup)	0	30	1
Persikabo 1973	2022–23	Liga 1	14	0	0	0	2	0	16	0
Persikabo 1973	2023–24	Liga 1	20	2	0	0	0	0	20	2
Malut United	2024–25	Liga 1	28	0	0	0	0	0	28	0
Malut United	2025–26	Super League	21	0	0	0	0	0	21	0
PSMS Medan	2026–27	Championship	1	0	0	0	–		1	0
Career total			238	11	2	0	9	1	249	12

=== International ===
As of match played 15 October 2019

Appearances and goals by national team and year
National team	Year	Apps	Goals
Indonesia	2014	8	0
Indonesia	2015	0	0
Indonesia	2016	6	1
Indonesia	2017	1	0
Indonesia	2018	2	0
Indonesia	2019	2	0
Total		19	1

=== International goal ===
International goals

Goal	Date	Venue	Opponent	Score	Result	Competition
1	7 December 2016	Mỹ Đình National Stadium, Hanoi, Vietnam	Vietnam	2–2	2–2 (a.e.t.)	2016 AFF Championship

== Honours ==
=== International ===
Indonesia U-23

- Islamic Solidarity Games silver medal: 2013
- SEA Games silver medal: 2013

Indonesia

- AFF Championship runner-up: 2016
