= Syafril Lestaluhu =

Indonesian footballer

Personal information
- Full name: Muhammad Syafril Lestaluhu
- Date of birth: 12 April 1998 (age 28)
- Place of birth: Tulehu, Indonesia
- Height: 1.72 m (5 ft 8 in)
- Position: Defensive midfielder

Youth career
- 2010–2014: SSB Garuda Tulehu
- 2015: Frenz United
- 2017–2021: Persib Bandung

Senior career*
Years	Team	Apps	(Gls)
2022	Persib Bandung	3	(0)
2022–2023	Persikabo 1973	0	(0)
2022	→ Kalteng Putra (loan)	2	(0)
2023	PSDS Deli Serdang	4	(0)
2023–2024	Persijap Jepara	1	(0)
- * Club domestic league appearances and goals as of 6 February 2024

Muhammad Syafril Lestaluhu (born 12 April 1998) is an Indonesian professional footballer who plays as a defensive midfielder.

== Club career ==
=== Persib Bandung ===
He was signed for Persib Bandung to play in Liga 1 in the 2021 season. Syafril made his first-team debut on 29 January 2022 in a match against Persikabo 1973 as a substitute for Beckham Putra in the 90+3rd minute at the Ngurah Rai Stadium, Denpasar.

=== Persikabo 1973 ===
Syafril was signed for Persikabo 1973 to play in Liga 1 in the 2022–23 season.

== Career statistics ==
=== Club ===
As of 6 February 2024.

Club	Season	League			Cup		Continental		Other		Total	
Club	Season	Division	Apps	Goals	Apps	Goals	Apps	Goals	Apps	Goals	Apps	Goals
Persib Bandung	2021–22	Liga 1	3	0	0	0	–		0	0	3	0
Persikabo 1973	2022–23	Liga 1	0	0	0	0	–		0	0	0	0
Kalteng Putra (loan)	2022–23	Liga 2	2	0	0	0	–		0	0	2	0
PSDS Deli Serdang	2023–24	Liga 2	4	0	0	0	–		0	0	4	0
Persijap Jepara	2023–24	Liga 2	1	0	0	0	–		0	0	1	0
Career total			10	0	0	0	0	0	0	0	10	0
