= Sunarto =

Indonesian footballer

Personal information
- Full name: Ahmad Sunarto
- Date of birth: 18 May 1990 (age 36)
- Place of birth: Malang, East Java, Indonesia
- Height: 1.69 m (5 ft 7 in)
- Position: Winger

Team information
- Current team: NZR Sumbersari
- Number: 15

Youth career
- 2006–2009: Arema

Senior career*
Years	Team	Apps	(Gls)
2009–2017	Arema	88	(16)
2017	→ Persiba Balikpapan (loan)	8	(2)
2018	Persis Solo	7	(1)
2018–2019	Arema	14	(3)
2020–2021	Semen Padang	9	(0)
2022–2023	PSKC Cimahi	6	(0)
2023–	NZR Sumbersari	10	(2)

International career
2013	Indonesia U23	4	(1)
Medal record
Men's football
Representing Indonesia
Islamic Solidarity Games
Silver medal – second place	Palembang 2013	Team
- * Club domestic league appearances and goals as of 11 February 2025

Ahmad Sunarto (born 18 May 1990) is an Indonesian professional footballer who plays as a winger for Liga Nusantara club NZR Sumbersari. He represented Indonesia at the 2013 Islamic Solidarity Games on home soil.

== International goals ==
=== Under-23 ===
Goal	Date	Venue	Opponent	Score	Result	Competition
1	25 September 2013	Gelora Sriwijaya Stadium, Palembang, Indonesia	Palestine	1–1	1–2	2013 ISG

== Honours ==
=== Club ===
Arema

- Indonesia Super League: 2009–10
- Menpora Cup: 2013
- Indonesian Inter Island Cup: 2014/15
- Indonesia President's Cup: 2017, 2019

=== International ===
Indonesia U-23

- Islamic Solidarity Games silver medal: 2013
