= Roni Beroperay =

Indonesian footballer

Rony Beroperay
Personal information
- Full name: Rony Esar Feliks Beroperay
- Date of birth: 25 February 1992 (age 34)
- Place of birth: Biak Numfor, Indonesia
- Height: 1.72 m (5 ft 8 in)
- Position: Left-back

Team information
- Current team: Persenus Nusantara
- Number: 4

Senior career*
Years	Team	Apps	(Gls)
2012–2013	Persiram Raja Ampat	19	(0)
2014–2017	Persipura Jayapura	35	(0)
2018–2019	Barito Putera	53	(0)
2020–2021	PSM Makassar	1	(0)
2021–2022	Persikabo 1973	17	(0)
2022–2024	Persipura Jayapura	3	(0)
2025–	Persenus Nusantara	7	(0)

International career
2013–2014	Indonesia U23	4	(1)
Medal record
Men's football
Representing Indonesia
Southeast Asian Games
Silver medal – second place	2013 Naypyidaw	Team
- * Club domestic league appearances and goals as of 17 February 2026

Rony Esar Feliks Beroperay (born 25 February 1992) is an Indonesian professional footballer who plays as a left-back for Liga 4 club Persenus Nusantara.

== International goals ==
International under-23 goals

Goal	Date	Venue	Opponent	Score	Result	Competition
1	22 November 2013	Gelora Bung Karno Stadium, Jakarta, Indonesia	Papua New Guinea U-23	6–0	6–0	2013 MNC Cup

== Personal life ==
In May 2016, Beroperay, along with teammates Yohanes Pahabol and Gerard Pangkali graduated from the Cenderawasih University in Jayapura with a degree in Physics. Beroperay is a Christian who gives credit to Jesus for his success.

== Honours ==
Persipura Jayapura

- Indonesia Soccer Championship A: 2016

Indonesia U-23

- SEA Games silver medal: 2013
