= Alfin Tuasalamony =

Indonesian footballer

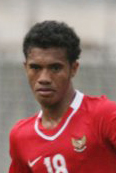
- Tuasalamony with Indonesia U19 in 2009

Personal information
- Full name: Alfin Ismail Tuasalamony
- Date of birth: 13 November 1992 (age 33)
- Place of birth: Tulehu, Indonesia
- Height: 1.77 m (5 ft 10 in)
- Position: Right-back

Team information
- Current team: PSPS Pekanbaru
- Number: 25

Youth career
- 2008–2010: Deportivo Indonesia

Senior career*
Years	Team	Apps	(Gls)
2011–2013	Visé	49	(1)
2014	Persebaya (Bhayangkara)	22	(4)
2015	Persija Jakarta	2	(0)
2016–2017	Bhayangkara	8	(0)
2018	Sriwijaya	12	(0)
2018–2021	Arema	39	(0)
2020	→ Madura United (loan)	1	(0)
2021	Madura United	11	(1)
2021–2023	RANS Nusantara	19	(3)
2023–2024	Persikabo 1973	6	(0)
2023–2024	→ Persela Lamongan (loan)	10	(0)
2024–2025	Persibo Bojonegoro	19	(0)
2025–	PSPS Pekanbaru	28	(4)

International career
2007	Indonesia U15		
2007−2008	Indonesia U16	4	(0)
2009	Indonesia U19	5	(0)
2013–2014	Indonesia U23	17	(3)
2014–2018	Indonesia	3	(1)
Medal record
Men's football
Representing Indonesia
Southeast Asian Games
Silver medal – second place	2013 Naypyidaw	Team
Islamic Solidarity Games
Silver medal – second place	2013 Palembang	Team
- * Club domestic league appearances and goals as of 18 October 2026

Alfin Ismail Tuasalamony (born 13 November 1992) is an Indonesian professional footballer who plays as a right-back for Liga 2 club PSPS Pekanbaru. On 30 April 2015, Tuasalamony suffered a broken a double left leg fracture because he was hit by a motorist after going to the bank, this made him absent from the 2015 Southeast Asian Games and to be out of action for at least one-year.

== Career statistics ==
=== Club ===
As of match played 18 October 2026

Club statistics
Club	Season	League		Cup (Note: Includes Belgian Cup, Piala Indonesia)		Other (Note: Appearances in Indonesia President's Cup)		Total	
Club	Season	Apps	Goals	Apps	Goals	Apps	Goals	Apps	Goals
Visé	2011–12	20	1	1	0	0	0	20	1
Visé	2012–13	29	0	1	0	0	0	29	0
Visé	Total	49	1	1	0	0	0	50	1
Persebaya Bhayangkara	2014	22	4	0	0	0	0	22	4
Persija Jakarta	2015	2	0	0	0	0	0	2	0
Bhayangkara	2017	8	0	0	0	0	0	8	0
Sriwijaya	2018	12	0	0	0	6	0	18	0
Arema	2018	16	0	0	0	0	0	16	0
Arema	2019	23	0	1	0	5	0	29	0
Arema	Total	39	0	1	0	5	0	45	0
Madura United (loan)	2020	1	0	0	0	0	0	1	0
Madura United	2021–22	11	1	0	0	4 (Note: Appearances in Menpora Cup)	0	15	1
RANS Nusantara	2021	5	3	0	0	0	0	5	3
RANS Nusantara	2022–23	14	0	0	0	4	0	18	0
RANS Nusantara	Total	19	3	0	0	4	0	23	3
Persikabo 1973	2022–23	3	0	0	0	0	0	3	0
Persikabo 1973	2023–24	3	0	0	0	0	0	3	0
Persela Lamongan (loan)	2023–24	10	0	0	0	0	0	10	0
Persibo Bojonegoro	2024–25	19	0	0	0	0	0	19	0
PSPS Pekanbaru	2025–26	24	4	0	0	0	0	24	4
PSPS Pekanbaru	2026–27	4	0	0	0	0	0	4	0
Career total		204	13	3	0	19	0	226	13

=== International ===
As of match played 10 October 2018

Appearances and goals by national team and year
National team	Year	Apps	Goals
Indonesia	2014	2	1
Indonesia	2018	1	0
Total		3	1

=== International goals ===
Alfin Tuasalamony Goals for Indonesia

#	Date	Venue	Opponent	Score	Result	Competition
1.	15 May 2014	Gelora Bung Karno Stadium, Jakarta, Indonesia	Dominican Republic	1–1	1–1	Friendly

== Honours ==
=== Club ===
Persebaya Bhayangkara

- Liga 1: 2017

Sriwijaya

- East Kalimantan Governor Cup: 2018

Arema

- Indonesia President's Cup: 2019

RANS Cilegon

- Liga 2 runner-up: 2021

=== International ===
Indonesia U-23

- Islamic Solidarity Games silver medal: 2013
- SEA Games silver medal: 2013
