= Ramdani Lestaluhu =

Indonesian footballer (born 1991)

Personal information
- Full name: Rizky Ramdani Lestaluhu
- Date of birth: 5 November 1991 (age 35)
- Place of birth: Tulehu, Indonesia
- Height: 1.67 m (5 ft 6 in)
- Positions: Attacking midfielder; winger

Youth career
- PPLP Ambon
- Diklat Ragunan
- 2007–2009: Persija Jakarta

Senior career*
Years	Team	Apps	(Gls)
2007–2012	Persija Jakarta	49	(5)
2013	Sriwijaya	25	(7)
2014–2022	Persija Jakarta	125	(23)
2022	→ PSS Sleman (loan)	11	(0)
2022–2024	Bali United	32	(0)
2024	Persiku Kudus	4	(0)
Total		246	(35)

International career
2005	Indonesia U17		
2008	Indonesia U18		
2007	Indonesia U19	4	(2)
2008	Indonesia U21	0	(0)
2011–2014	Indonesia U23	21	(5)
2014–2019	Indonesia	4	(2)
Medal record
Men's football
Representing Indonesia
Islamic Solidarity Games
Silver medal – second place	2013 Palembang	Team
Southeast Asian Games
Silver medal – second place	2011 Jakarta-Palembang	Team
Silver medal – second place	2013 Naypyidaw	Team
- * Club domestic league appearances and goals

Rizky Ramdani Lestaluhu (born 5 November 1991 in Tulehu) is an Indonesian former professional footballer who last played an attacking midfielder or as a winger.

== Personal life ==
Lestaluhu was born to Abdul Latif Lestaluhu and Healthy Ohorella as the first child of eight. Nicknamed Dani by his friends Lestaluhu was discovered by Iwan Setiawan, a former U-17 national team coach, who saw him playing. Lestaluhu is Muslim. His younger brothers Rafid Lestaluhu, Abduh Lestaluhu, and Pandi Lestaluhu are also professional footballers.

== International career ==
Lestaluhu made his international debut for Indonesia on 28 November 2014, in a match against Laos in the 2014 AFF Suzuki Cup. He scored two goals in a 5–1 win.

== Career statistics ==
=== International ===
Appearances and goals by national team and year
National team	Year	Apps	Goals
Indonesia	2014	3	2
Indonesia	2015	0	0
Indonesia	2016	0	0
Indonesia	2017	0	0
Indonesia	2018	0	0
Indonesia	2019	1	0
Total		4	2

== International goals ==
International under-23 goals

#	Date	Venue	Opponent	Score	Result	Competition
1	7 November 2011	Gelora Bung Karno Stadium, Jakarta, Indonesia	Cambodia U-23	6–0	6–0	2011 Southeast Asian Games
2	21 November 2013	Gelora Bung Karno Stadium, Jakarta, Indonesia	Laos U-23	1–0	3–0	2013 MNC Cup
3	30 March 2014	Manahan Stadium, Surakarta, Indonesia	Sri Lanka U-23	5–0	5–0	Friendly
4	2 April 2014	Hougang Stadium, Hougang, Singapore	Singapore U-23	1–1	1–2	Friendly
5	26 September 2014	Incheon Football Stadium, Incheon, South Korea	Maldives U-23	0–1	0–4	2014 Asian Games

International goals

#	Date	Venue	Opponent	Score	Result	Competition
1.	28 November 2014	Hàng Đẫy Stadium, Hanoi, Vietnam	Laos	2–0	5–1	2014 AFF Suzuki Cup
2.	28 November 2014	Hàng Đẫy Stadium, Hanoi, Vietnam	Laos	3–1	5–1	2014 AFF Suzuki Cup

== Honours ==
Persija Jakarta

- Liga 1: 2018
- Indonesia President's Cup: 2018
- Menpora Cup: 2021
- Piala Indonesia runner-up: 2018–19

Indonesia U-23

- SEA Games silver medal: 2011, 2013
- Islamic Solidarity Games silver medal: 2013
