= Nelson Alom =

Indonesian footballer

Personal information
- Full name: Nelson Alom
- Date of birth: 27 October 1990 (age 36)
- Place of birth: Puncak, Indonesia
- Height: 1.72 m (5 ft 8 in)
- Position: Defensive midfielder

Team information
- Current team: PSBS Biak
- Number: 90

Youth career
- 2007–2010: Persipura Jayapura

Senior career*
Years	Team	Apps	(Gls)
2010–2018	Persipura Jayapura	93	(1)
2018–2020	Persebaya Surabaya	7	(0)
2020–2021	Madura United	0	(0)
2021–2022	Persipura Jayapura	22	(0)
2022–2023	Persita Tangerang	14	(0)
2023–	PSBS Biak	37	(0)

International career
2013	Indonesia U23	5	(0)
Medal record
Men's football
Representing Indonesia
Southeast Asian Games
Silver medal – second place	2013 Naypyidaw	Team
- * Club domestic league appearances and goals as of 9 March 2026

Nelson Alom (born 27 October 1990) is an Indonesian professional footballer who plays as a defensive midfielder for Super League club PSBS Biak.

== International career ==
In 2013, Alom represented the Indonesia U-23, in the 2013 Southeast Asian Games.

== Honours ==
Persipura Jayapura

- Indonesia Super League: 2013
- Indonesia Soccer Championship A: 2016

Persebaya Surabaya

- Indonesia President's Cup runner-up: 2019

PSBS Biak

- Liga 2: 2023–24

Indonesia U-23

- SEA Games silver medal: 2013
