= Yohan Ibo =

Indonesian footballer

Johan Ibo
Personal information
- Full name: Johan Ibo
- Date of birth: 19 September 1985 (age 41)
- Place of birth: Jayapura, Indonesia
- Height: 1.80 m (5 ft 11 in)
- Position: Defender

Senior career*
Years	Team	Apps	(Gls)
2007–2010	Pelita Jaya	50	(0)
2010–2011	Persebaya Surabaya	14	(0)
2011–2012	Arema Indonesia (ISL)	23	(0)
2012–2013	Barito Putera	15	(0)
2014–2016	Persiba Bantul	31	(0)
Total		133	(0)
- * Club domestic league appearances and goals

Johan Ibo (born 19 September 1985 in Jayapura Regency, Papua, Indonesia) is an Indonesian former footballer.

His brother Andri Ibo is also a professional footballer who currently plays for Persis Solo in the Liga 1.
