= Andik Vermansah =

Indonesian professional footballer

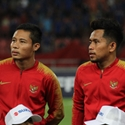
- Andik with Indonesia in 2012

Personal information
- Full name: Andik Vermansah
- Date of birth: 23 November 1991 (age 34)
- Place of birth: Jember, Indonesia
- Height: 1.63 m (5 ft 4 in)
- Position: Winger

Team information
- Current team: Garudayaksa
- Number: 7

Youth career
- 2005–2008: Persebaya Surabaya

Senior career*
Years	Team	Apps	(Gls)
2008–2013	Persebaya Surabaya	90	(11)
2014–2017	Selangor	67	(11)
2018	Kedah	13	(2)
2019	Madura United	24	(2)
2020–2023	Bhayangkara	53	(1)
2023–2025	Persiraja Banda Aceh	33	(5)
2025–	Garudayaksa	25	(2)

International career
2012	Indonesia U21	6	(5)
2011–2013	Indonesia U23	21	(3)
2012–2019	Indonesia	31	(2)
Medal record
Men's football
Representing Indonesia
Southeast Asian Games
Silver medal – second place	2011 Jakarta-Palembang	Team
Silver medal – second place	2013 Naypyidaw	Team
Islamic Solidarity Games
Silver medal – second place	2013 Palembang	Team
AFF Championship
Runner-up	2016 Myanmar & Philippines	Team
- * Club domestic league appearances and goals as of 6 September 2026

Andik Vermansah (born 23 November 1991) is an Indonesian professional footballer who plays as a winger for Super League club Garudayaksa.

== Early life ==
Andik was born in Jember, East Java, to Saman, a coolie, and Jumiah, a tailor, both indigenous Javanese. He spent his childhood selling ice as a means of earning money for his family. His parents, earning barely enough money for living expenditures, had little fund to help Andik realise his dream as a footballer. At first Andik was not allowed to pursue his footballing career due to his family's economic condition. However, a strongly motivated Andik did not gave up on his dream of becoming a professional footballer. He did everything he could to pursue his dream by all means and to fund his burgeoning career he had to sell cake and ice, even playing football for inter-village tournament, just to be able to buy a pair of football shoes. Andik received his big break when the coach of SSB Suryanaga, Rudi, discovered his talents. Rudi offered Andik to play at a football academy in Jember, free of charge.

== Club career ==
=== Early career ===
Andik started his career with Persebaya (1927) U-18. With Persebaya (1927) U-18, Andik won the East Java Regional Youth League in 2007. And in that year, Andik presented gold medals to the city of Surabaya in the Provincial Sports Week.

In 2008, Andik had a big role in bringing home the gold medal for East Java at National Sports Week, which was held in Kalimantan.

=== Persebaya ===
Andik joined Persebaya after a successful trial. He succeeded in the trial due to his immense potential and ability. After joining the club, he continued working hard and impressed many with his pace and dribbling ability and eventually broke into Persebaya's first team. And at the age of 17, he was one of the youngest players in the squad at the time. He made his official debut for Persebaya on 29 August 2008, coming on in the 77th minute in a 2–0 victory against Persekabpas Pasuruan.

==== Overseas trials ====
In October 2011, Serie A Giant Inter Milan was interested in him. On 7 September 2012, Andik joined Major League Soccer side D.C. United on trial and played several times for their reserve team but did not sign a contract with them and eventually returned to Persebaya.

On 6 October 2013 following a trial in Ventforet Kofu, in his debut he scored a goal in a reserves match against Shimizu S-Pulse. His performance made headlines in Japanese newspapers and impressed the 2,000 supporters in attendance.

=== Selangor ===
On 1 December 2013, Andik joined Malaysia Super League side Selangor on a two-years contract. He chose Selangor because they offered him a bigger salary than the salary offered by the J1 League side, Ventforet Kofu. His salary (rumoured $150,000/yr.) would make him one of the best paid Indonesian athletes.

Andik made his first Selangor debut in the 2014 Malaysia FA Cup in a 0–2 win against Harimau Muda C on 22 January 2014. On 25 March, Andik scored his first league goal in the 2014 Malaysia Super League for Selangor in a 2–0 victory over Sarawak at the Sarawak State Stadium.

Andik helped Selangor FA to finish as runners-up in the 2014 Malaysian Super League. He also recorded one of the high assist totals in the league during the 2014 Season before signing a new contract with Selangor FA for the 2015 Malaysian Super League Season.

Andik also holds the second fastest goal record in the Malaysia Super League history which the goal is as early as the 28th second during a match against Johor Darul Ta'zim FC. While the fastest goal was scored by Ahmad Fakri Saarani who scored during the 12th second and holds the 6th place in the world's fastest goal record.

Andik has expanded his contract with Selangor FA until 2017 worth 3 billion Rupiah's making him the most paid footballer in Indonesia.

=== Kedah ===
On 9 February 2018, Andik signed a contract with another Malaysia Super League side Kedah. He has been given jersey number 30. Andik made his league debut in a 1–0 win against PKNP on 11 February 2018. On 22 June 2018, Andik scored his first league goal for Kedah against Kuala Lumpur as his team won 3–2.

=== Madura United ===
On 24 December 2018, Andik signed a contract with Liga 1 side Madura United. Andik made his Madura United debut in the first leg Round of 32 2018–19 Piala Indonesia against Cilegon United on 29 February 2019. and he also scored his first goal for the team in a 2–0 victory over Cilegon United at the Gelora Madura Stadium, he scored in the 66th minute.

Andik made his first Liga 1 appearance on 17 May 2019, coming on as a starter in a 1–5 win with Persela Lamongan at the Surajaya Stadium. On 24 May 2019, Andik scored his first goal for Madura United in a 0–1 victory over Barito Putera at the 17th May Stadium. During his career at Madura United, he made 24 league appearances and scored 2 goals for Madura United.

=== Bhayangkara ===
In 2020, Andik signed a one-year contract with Indonesian Liga 1 club Bhayangkara. Andik made his league debut in a 1–1 draw against Persik Kediri on 6 March 2020. And then, this season was suspended on 27 March 2020 due to the COVID-19 pandemic. The season was abandoned and was declared void on 20 January 2021.

On 29 August 2021, he started his match in the 2021–22 Liga 1 season for Bhayangkara in a 2–1 win over Persiraja Banda Aceh, he coming as a substitute for Renan Silva in the 80th minute. He played the full 90 minutes in the won to Bali United on 23 October.

He played 84 minutes in the won to Madura United on 14 January 2022, where he registered two assist. On 5 December 2022, Andik scored his first league goal in the 2022–23 Liga 1 for Bhayangkara in a 3–1 victory over PSS Sleman at the Jatidiri Stadium.

== Career statistics ==
=== Club ===
As of 6 September 2026

Appearances and goals by club, season and competition
Club	Season	League			Cup (Note: Includes Malaysia FA Cup, Piala Indonesia)		League Cup (Note: Appearances in Malaysia Cup)		Asia (Note: Appearances in AFC Cup)		Total	
Club	Season	Division	Apps	Goals	Apps	Goals	Apps	Goals	Apps	Goals	Apps	Goals
Selangor	2014	Super League	20	2	2	0	8	3	2	0	32	5
Selangor	2015	Super League	22	6	1	0	11	1	—		34	7
Selangor	2016	Super League	17	1	1	0	9	1	5	0	32	2
Selangor	2017	Super League	8	2	0	0	8	0	—		16	2
Selangor	Total		67	11	4	0	36	5	7	0	114	16
Kedah	2018	Super League	13	2	1	0	2	0	0	0	16	2
Madura United	2019	Liga 1	24	2	7	3	0	0	0	0	31	5
Bhayangkara	2020	Liga 1	2	0	0	0	0	0	0	0	2	0
Bhayangkara	2021–22	Liga 1	29	0	0	0	0	0	0	0	29	0
Bhayangkara	2022–23	Liga 1	22	1	0	0	0	0	0	0	22	1
Persiraja Banda Aceh	2023–24	Liga 2	14	1	0	0	0	0	0	0	14	1
Persiraja Banda Aceh	2024–25	Liga 2	19	4	0	0	0	0	0	0	19	4
Garudayaksa	2025–26	Championship	24	2	0	0	0	0	0	0	24	2
Garudayaksa	2026–27	Super League	1	0	0	0	0	0	0	0	1	0
Career total			215	23	12	3	38	5	7	0	272	31

=== International ===
As of match played 10 October 2019

Indonesia national team
Year	Apps	Goals
2012	6	1
2013	5	0
2016	9	1
2017	2	0
2018	4	0
2019	5	0
Total	31	2

International goals

Goal	Date	Venue	Opponent	Score	Result	Competition
1	28 November 2012	Bukit Jalil National Stadium, Kuala Lumpur, Malaysia	Singapore	1–0	1–0	2012 AFF Championship
2	25 November 2016	Rizal Memorial Stadium, Manila, Philippines	Singapore	1–1	2–1	2016 AFF Championship

== Honours ==
=== Club ===
Persebaya Surabaya

- Liga Primer Indonesia: 2011
- Malaysia-Indonesia Unity Cup: 2011
- Indonesia Premier League runner-up: 2011–12

Selangor FA

- Malaysia Cup: 2015

Garudayaksa

- Championship: 2025–26

=== International ===
Indonesia U-21

- Hassanal Bolkiah Trophy runner-up: 2012

Indonesia U-23

- SEA Games silver medal: 2011, 2013
- Islamic Solidarity Games silver medal: 2013

Indonesia

- AFF Championship runner-up: 2016

=== Individual ===
- Goal.com Asian Under-23 Best XI for 2011
- 2016 AFF Championship : Best Goal
