= Football at the 2013 SEA Games – Men's team squads =

Below are the squads for the Football at the 2013 SEA Games – men's tournament, hosted by Myanmar, which took place between 7 and 21 December 2013.

== Group A ==
=== Malaysia ===
Head coach: (Malaysia) Ong Kim Swee

No.	Pos.	Player	Date of birth (age)	Club
1	GK	Mohd Farhan Abu Bakar	14 February 1993 (aged 20)	(Football Association of Malaysia) Harimau Muda A
2	DF	K. Reuben	2 April 1990 (aged 23)	(Football Association of Malaysia) ATM
3	DF	Shahrul Mohd Saad	8 July 1993 (aged 20)	(Football Association of Malaysia) Harimau Muda A
4	DF	Mohd Fadhli Mohd Shas	21 January 1991 (aged 22)	(Football Association of Malaysia) Darul Takzim
5	MF	Ashri Chuchu	27 February 1991 (aged 22)	(Football Association of Malaysia) Sarawak
6	MF	D. Saarvindran	4 October 1992 (aged 21)	(Football Association of Malaysia) Harimau Muda A
7	MF	Mohd Irfan Fazail (c)	12 April 1991 (aged 22)	(Football Association of Malaysia) Darul Takzim
9	FW	Thamil Arasu Ambumamee	4 July 1991 (aged 22)	(Football Association of Malaysia) Selangor
11	FW	Rozaimi Abdul Rahman	11 June 1992 (aged 21)	(Football Association of Malaysia) Harimau Muda A
12	MF	S. Sivanesan	28 December 1990 (aged 22)	(Football Association of Malaysia) Negeri Sembilan
16	DF	Mohd Zubir Azmi	14 November 1991 (aged 22)	(Football Association of Malaysia) Terengganu
17	DF	Wan Ahmad Amirzafran Wan Nadris	20 December 1994 (aged 18)	(Football Association of Malaysia) Harimau Muda B
19	FW	Ahmad Hazwan Bakri	19 June 1991 (aged 22)	(Football Association of Malaysia) Selangor
20	DF	Mohd Azrif Nasrulhaq	27 May 1991 (aged 22)	(Football Association of Malaysia) PKNS
22	GK	Mohd Izham Tarmizi	24 April 1991 (aged 22)	(Football Association of Malaysia) Darul Takzim
23	MF	Mohd Nasir Basharuddin	29 March 1990 (aged 23)	(Football Association of Malaysia) Perak
	DF	Nazirul Naim Che Hashim	6 April 1993 (aged 20)	(Japan Football Association) Ryūkyū
	DF	D. Kenny Pallraj	7 September 1990 (aged 23)	(Football Association of Malaysia) Harimau Muda A
	MF	Nazmi Faiz	16 August 1994 (aged 19)	(Football Association of Malaysia) PKNS
	MF	Muhammad Nurridzuan Abu Hassan	20 April 1992 (aged 21)	(Football Association of Malaysia) Harimau Muda A
	FW	Mohd Ferris Danial	18 April 1990 (aged 23)	(Football Association of Malaysia) Terengganu

=== Vietnam ===
Head coach: (Vietnam) Hoàng Văn Phúc

No.	Pos.	Player	Date of birth (age)	Club
1	GK	Trần Bửu Ngọc	19 June 1991 (aged 22)	(Vietnam Football Federation) TĐCS Đồng Tháp
2	DF	Trần Đình Hoàng	8 December 1991 (aged 21)	(Vietnam Football Federation) Sông Lam Nghệ An
3	DF	Đinh Tiến Thành	24 January 1991 (aged 22)	(Vietnam Football Federation) XM Vicem Hải Phòng
6	DF	Quế Ngọc Hải	15 May 1993 (aged 20)	(Vietnam Football Federation) Sông Lam Nghệ An
7	MF	Nguyễn Huy Hùng	22 June 1992 (aged 21)	(Vietnam Football Federation) Hà Nội T&T Youth
8	MF	Hoàng Danh Ngọc	3 April 1990 (aged 23)	(Vietnam Football Federation) XM The Vissai Ninh Bình
9	FW	Mạc Hồng Quân	1 January 1992 (aged 21)	(Vietnam Football Federation) Thanh Hóa
10	MF	Nguyễn Văn Quyết (c)	27 June 1991 (aged 22)	(Vietnam Football Federation) Hà Nội T&T
11	MF	Vũ Minh Tuấn	19 September 1990 (aged 23)	(Vietnam Football Federation) Than Quảng Ninh
14	MF	Nguyễn Hải Huy	18 June 1991 (aged 22)	(Vietnam Football Federation) Than Quảng Ninh
15	DF	Phạm Mạnh Hùng	3 March 1993 (aged 20)	(Vietnam Football Federation) Sông Lam Nghệ An
16	DF	Sầm Ngọc Đức	18 May 1992 (aged 21)	(Vietnam Football Federation) Hà Nội T&T
17	MF	Lê Văn Thắng	8 February 1990 (aged 23)	(Vietnam Football Federation) Thanh Hóa
18	FW	Hà Minh Tuấn	15 March 1990 (aged 23)	(Vietnam Football Federation) SHB Đà Nẵng
19	MF	Trần Phi Sơn	6 February 1992 (aged 21)	(Vietnam Football Federation) Sông Lam Nghệ An
20	DF	Lê Quang Hùng	7 June 1992 (aged 21)	(Vietnam Football Federation) XM The Vissai Ninh Bình
21	MF	Trần Mạnh Dũng	9 March 1990 (aged 23)	(Vietnam Football Federation) XM The Vissai Ninh Bình
22	GK	Trần Nguyên Mạnh	25 August 1991 (aged 22)	(Vietnam Football Federation) Sông Lam Nghệ An
25	MF	Lê Hoàng Thiên	25 December 1990 (aged 22)	(Vietnam Football Federation) Hoàng Anh Gia Lai
26	MF	Nguyễn Thanh Hiền	16 April 1993 (aged 20)	(Vietnam Football Federation) TĐCS Đồng Tháp

=== Singapore ===
Head coach: (Singapore) Aide Iskandar

No.	Pos.	Player	Date of birth (age)	Caps	Goals	Club
1	GK	Izwan Mahbud	14 July 1990 (aged 23)			(Football Association of Singapore) LionsXII
3	FW	Sahil Suhaimi	7 September 1992 (aged 21)			(Football Association of Singapore) Young Lions
4	DF	Afiq Yunos	10 December 1990 (aged 22)			(Football Association of Singapore) Young Lions
5	MF	Anumanthan Kumar	14 July 1994 (aged 19)			(Football Association of Singapore) Young Lions
6	DF	Madhu Mohana	6 March 1991 (aged 22)			(Football Association of Singapore) LionsXII
7	MF	Gabriel Quak	22 December 1990 (aged 22)			(Football Association of Singapore) LionsXII
8	MF	Hafiz Abu Sujad	1 November 1990 (aged 23)			(Football Association of Singapore) LionsXII
9	DF	Faritz Hameed	16 January 1990 (aged 23)			(Football Association of Singapore) LionsXII
11	MF	Faris Ramli	24 August 1992 (aged 21)			(Football Association of Singapore) LionsXII
14	DF	Hariss Harun (c)	19 November 1990 (aged 23)			(Football Association of Malaysia) Darul Takzim
17	MF	Zulfahmi Arifin	5 October 1991 (aged 22)			(Football Association of Singapore) LionsXII
19	GK	Khairulhin Khalid	18 July 1991 (aged 22)			(Football Association of Singapore) LionsXII
20	MF	Izzdin Shafiq	14 December 1990 (aged 22)			(Football Association of Singapore) LionsXII
21	DF	Safuwan Baharudin	22 September 1991 (aged 22)			(Football Association of Singapore) LionsXII
23	DF	Nazrul Nazari	11 February 1991 (aged 22)			(Football Association of Singapore) LionsXII
26	MF	Shahfiq Ghani	17 March 1992 (aged 21)			(Football Association of Singapore) LionsXII
27	MF	Iqbal Hussain	6 June 1993 (aged 20)			(Football Association of Singapore) Young Lions
29	DF	Al-Qaasimy Rahman	21 January 1992 (aged 21)			(Football Association of Singapore) Young Lions
30	GK	Syazwan Buhari	22 September 1992 (aged 21)			(Football Association of Singapore) Young Lions

=== Laos ===
Head coach: (Japan) Kokichi Kimura

No.	Pos.	Player	Date of birth (age)	Caps	Goals	Club
1	GK	Soukthavy Soundala	4 November 1995 (aged 18)			(Lao Football Federation) Ezra
2	DF	Bounheng Douangdy	20 September 1992 (aged 21)			(Lao Football Federation) Lao Lane Xang
3	DF	Chintana Souksavath (c)	20 July 1990 (aged 23)			(Lao Football Federation) Yotha
4	DF	Ketsada Souksavanh	23 November 1992 (aged 21)			(Lao Football Federation) SHB Champasak
5	DF	Saychon Khunsamnarn	13 January 1993 (aged 20)			(Lao Football Federation) Lao Army
6	MF	Phouthone Innalay	10 October 1993 (aged 20)			(Lao Football Federation) Lao Army
7	MF	Khonesavanh Sihavong	10 October 1994 (aged 19)			(Lao Football Federation) Lao League
8	MF	Chanthaphone Waenvongsoth	4 November 1994 (aged 19)			(Lao Football Federation) Hoàng Anh Attapeu
9	FW	Sopha Saysana	9 December 1992 (aged 20)			(Football Association of Thailand) Nong Khai
10	MF	Soukaphone Vongchiengkham	9 March 1992 (aged 21)			(Football Association of Thailand) Krabi
11	MF	Phoutdavy Phommasane	2 February 1994 (aged 19)			(Lao Football Federation) Lao Lane Xang
12	DF	Khamphoumy Hanvilay	2 December 1990 (aged 23)			(Lao Football Federation) Yotha
13	MF	Manolom Phomsouvanh	26 September 1992 (aged 21)			(Football Association of Thailand) Nong Khai
14	FW	Khanmixay Douangchan	26 March 1995 (aged 18)			(Lao Football Federation) Yotha
15	DF	Phouthasay Khochalern	15 May 1993 (aged 20)			(Lao Football Federation) SHB Champasak
16	MF	Daoneua Siviengxay	10 December 1991 (aged 21)			(Lao Football Federation) Vientiane
17	MF	Vilayuth Sayyabounsou	27 November 1992 (aged 21)			(Lao Football Federation) Ezra
18	GK	Seng Athit Somvang	2 June 1991 (aged 22)			(Lao Football Federation) Lao Police
19	MF	Sisawad Dalavong	11 August 1996 (aged 17)			(Lao Football Federation) Ezra
20	MF	Khouanta Sivongthong	5 March 1993 (aged 20)			(Lao Football Federation) Yotha

=== Brunei ===
Head coach: (South Korea) Kwon Oh-Son

No.	Pos.	Player	Date of birth (age)	Caps	Goals	Club
1	GK	Omar Aqammaddin Salehuddin	8 January 1990 (aged 23)			(Football Association of Brunei Darussalam) Indera
2	DF	Afi Aminuddin	9 October 1991 (aged 22)			(Football Association of Brunei Darussalam) Indera
3	DF	Khairil Shahme Suhaimi	16 April 1993 (aged 20)			(Football Association of Brunei Darussalam)
4	DF	Nur Aziz Ali	17 March 1993 (aged 20)			(Football Association of Brunei Darussalam)
5	DF	At'Tawab Ali Rahman	19 August 1993 (aged 20)			(Football Association of Brunei Darussalam)
6	DF	Abdul Mu'iz Sisa	20 April 1991 (aged 22)			(Football Association of Brunei Darussalam) Indera
7	MF	Azwan Ali Rahman	11 January 1992 (aged 21)			(Football Association of Brunei Darussalam)
8	MF	Mazazizi Mazlan	20 May 1996 (aged 17)			(Football Association of Brunei Darussalam)
9	FW	Asri Aspar	17 January 1996 (aged 17)			(Football Association of Brunei Darussalam)
10	DF	Nur Ikhwan Othman	15 January 1993 (aged 20)			(Football Association of Brunei Darussalam) Indera
11	FW	Safwan Amaluddin Sabli	25 January 1995 (aged 18)			(Football Association of Brunei Darussalam)
12	DF	Zulkhairy Razali	16 May 1996 (aged 17)			(Football Association of Brunei Darussalam)
13	DF	Hazwan Hamzah	9 September 1991 (aged 22)			(Football Association of Brunei Darussalam)
14	FW	Aqmal Hakeem Abdul Hamid	14 October 1990 (aged 23)			(Football Association of Brunei Darussalam) QAF FC
15	MF	Yazid Azmi	26 April 1991 (aged 22)			(Football Association of Brunei Darussalam)
17	MF	Shafie Effendy	4 August 1995 (aged 18)			(Football Association of Brunei Darussalam)
20	FW	Adi Said (c)	15 January 1990 (aged 23)			(Football Association of Brunei Darussalam) DPMM FC
21	DF	Yura Indera Putera Yunos	25 March 1996 (aged 17)			(Football Association of Brunei Darussalam)
26	MF	Aminuddin Zakwan Tahir	24 October 1994 (aged 19)			(Football Association of Brunei Darussalam) Muara Vella
27	DF	Azri Zahari	12 February 1992 (aged 21)			(Football Association of Brunei Darussalam)
28	GK	Abdul Hafiz Abdul Rahim	6 November 1995 (aged 18)			(Football Association of Brunei Darussalam)

== Group B ==
=== Indonesia ===
Head coach: (Indonesia) Rahmad Darmawan

No.	Pos.	Player	Date of birth (age)	Caps	Goals	Club
1	GK	Kurnia Meiga (c)	7 May 1990 (aged 23)	18	0	(Football Association of Indonesia) Arema Cronus
2	DF	Syahrizal Syahbuddin	2 October 1993 (aged 20)	3	0	(Football Association of Indonesia) Persija Jakarta
3	FW	Dendi Santoso	16 May 1990 (aged 23)	5	2	(Football Association of Indonesia) Arema Cronus
4	MF	Rizky Pellu	26 June 1992 (aged 21)	5	0	(Football Association of Indonesia) Pelita Bandung Raya
7	MF	Ramdhani Lestaluhu	5 November 1991 (aged 22)	10	2	(Football Association of Indonesia) Persija Jakarta
8	MF	Egi Melgiansyah	4 September 1990 (aged 23)	17	1	(Football Association of Indonesia) Persija Jakarta
9	FW	Yandi Munawar	25 May 1992 (aged 21)	2	2	(Football Australia) Brisbane Roar Youth
10	DF	Roni Beroperay	25 February 1992 (aged 21)	3	1	Unattached
11	MF	Dedi Kusnandar	23 July 1991 (aged 22)	7	0	(Football Association of Indonesia) Persebaya ISL (Bhayangkara)
12	GK	Andritany Ardhiyasa	26 December 1991 (aged 21)	7	0	(Football Association of Indonesia) Persija Jakarta
13	MF	Manahati Lestusen	17 December 1993 (aged 19)	7	0	(Football Association of Indonesia) Persebaya ISL (Bhayangkara)
17	FW	Yohanes Pahabol	16 January 1992 (aged 21)	4	1	(Football Association of Indonesia) Persipura Jayapura
21	FW	Andik Vermansyah	23 November 1991 (aged 22)	17	3	(Football Association of Malaysia) Selangor
22	MF	Fandi Eko Utomo	2 March 1991 (aged 22)	10	0	(Football Association of Indonesia) Persebaya ISL (Bhayangkara)
23	FW	Bayu Gatra	12 November 1991 (aged 22)	5	1	(Football Association of Indonesia) Persisam Putra Samarinda
24	DF	Diego Michiels	8 August 1990 (aged 23)	11	0	Unattached
26	DF	Alfin Tuasalamony	13 November 1992 (aged 21)	6	1	(Football Association of Indonesia) Persebaya ISL (Bhayangkara)
27	MF	Nelson Alom	27 October 1990 (aged 23)	3	0	(Football Association of Indonesia) Persipura Jayapura
28	DF	Andri Ibo	3 April 1990 (aged 23)	5	1	(Football Association of Indonesia) Persipura Jayapura
29	DF	Mokhamad Syaifuddin	9 October 1992 (aged 21)	3	0	(Football Association of Indonesia) Pelita Bandung Raya

=== Myanmar ===
Head coach: (South Korea) Park Seong-Hwa

No.	Pos.	Player	Date of birth (age)	Caps	Goals	Club
1	GK	Pyae Phyo Aung	8 July 1991 (aged 22)			(Myanmar Football Federation) Southern Myanmar
2	FW	Sithu Aung	16 October 1996 (aged 17)			(Myanmar Football Federation) Yangon United
3	DF	Zaw Min Tun	20 May 1992 (aged 21)			(Myanmar Football Federation) Magway
4	DF	Aung Hein Kyaw	19 July 1991 (aged 22)			(Myanmar Football Federation) Zeyashwemye
5	DF	Yan Aung Win	9 September 1992 (aged 21)			(Myanmar Football Federation) Yangon United
6	MF	Naing Lin Oo	15 June 1993 (aged 20)			(Myanmar Football Federation) Ayeyawady United
7	FW	Kyaw Zayar Win (c)	2 May 1991 (aged 22)			(Football Association of Malaysia) Perak
8	FW	Kyi Lin	4 September 1992 (aged 21)			(Myanmar Football Federation) Yangon United
9	FW	Kaung Sithu	22 January 1993 (aged 20)			(Myanmar Football Federation) Yangon United
10	FW	Kyaw Ko Ko	20 December 1992 (aged 20)			(Myanmar Football Federation) Zeyashwemye
11	DF	David Htan	13 May 1990 (aged 23)			(Myanmar Football Federation) Yangon United
12	MF	Nay Lin Tun	19 March 1993 (aged 20)			(Myanmar Football Federation) Ayeyawady United
13	MF	Set Phyo Wai	1 December 1994 (aged 19)			(Myanmar Football Federation) Kanbawza
14	DF	Ye Win Aung	6 August 1993 (aged 20)			(Myanmar Football Federation) Yadanarbon
15	DF	Zan Bo Tun	13 August 1993 (aged 20)			(Myanmar Football Federation) Zeyashwemye
16	DF	Thein Than Win	25 November 1991 (aged 22)			(Myanmar Football Federation) Kanbawza
17	DF	Aung Zaw	5 March 1990 (aged 23)			(Myanmar Football Federation) Hantharwady United
18	GK	Kyaw Zin Phyo	1 February 1993 (aged 20)			(Myanmar Football Federation) Magway
19	MF	Kyaw Min Oo	24 May 1996 (aged 17)			(Myanmar Football Federation) Zwegabin United
20	FW	Thet Naing	20 December 1992 (aged 20)			(Myanmar Football Federation) Yadanarbon

=== Timor-Leste ===
Head coach: (Brazil) Emerson Alcântara

No.	Pos.	Player	Date of birth (age)	Caps	Goals	Club
1	GK	Juliao Monteiro	17 June 1993 (aged 20)			(East Timor Football Federation) U.S Lospalos
2	DF	Raimundo Sarmento	10 October 1994 (aged 19)			(East Timor Football Federation) Real Ermera Lions
3	DF	Paulo Martins	20 November 1991 (aged 22)			(Macau Football Association) Monte Carlo
4	DF	Jorge Sabas Victor	22 August 1991 (aged 22)			(Football Association of Indonesia) Persiku Dynamo Kupang
5	FW	Anggisu Barbosa (c)	16 March 1993 (aged 20)			(East Timor Football Federation) Porto Dili
6	MF	Nilo Soares	18 July 1994 (aged 19)			(East Timor Football Federation) Aviacao Timor FC
7	MF	Paulo Helber	28 June 1992 (aged 21)			(Brazilian Football Confederation) Monte Azul
8	MF	Fellipe Bertoldo	1 December 1992 (aged 21)			(Brazilian Football Confederation) Botafogo
9	FW	Pedro Henrique	17 January 1992 (aged 21)			(Brazilian Football Confederation) Petrolina
10	FW	João Pereira	6 January 1992 (aged 21)			(Football Association of Indonesia) Persiba Balikpapan
11	FW	José Martins	9 March 1994 (aged 19)			
12	GK	Ramos Maxanches	12 April 1994 (aged 19)			(East Timor Football Federation) A.D. Army
13	DF	Diogo Rangel	19 August 1991 (aged 22)			(Football Association of Indonesia) Sriwijaya
15	MF	Adelino Trindade	2 June 1995 (aged 18)			(East Timor Football Federation) Dili United
16	DF	Filipe Oliveira	26 July 1991 (aged 22)			
18	FW	Jairo Neto	4 March 1994 (aged 19)			(Portuguese Football Federation) Coimbra
19	MF	Boavida Olegario	24 October 1994 (aged 19)			(East Timor Football Federation) SLB Dili
20	MF	Thiago Fernandes	6 September 1992 (aged 21)			
21	GK	Fagio Augusto	8 August 1995 (aged 18)			(East Timor Football Federation) Nacional Policia SC
23	MF	José Fonseca	13 November 1994 (aged 19)			

=== Thailand ===
Head coach: (Thailand) Kiatisuk Senamuang

No.	Pos.	Player	Date of birth (age)	Caps	Goals	Club
2	DF	Peerapat Notchaiya	4 February 1993 (aged 20)			(Football Association of Thailand) BEC Tero Sasana
3	DF	Theerathon Bunmathan (c)	6 February 1990 (aged 23)			(Football Association of Thailand) Buriram United
4	DF	Sakolwat Skollah	22 February 1991 (aged 22)			(Football Association of Thailand) Bangkok F.C.
7	MF	Thitipan Puangchan	1 September 1993 (aged 20)			(Football Association of Thailand) Muangthong United
8	DF	Atit Daosawang	11 November 1992 (aged 21)			(Football Association of Thailand) Muangthong United
9	FW	Adisak Kraisorn	1 February 1991 (aged 22)			(Football Association of Thailand) Buriram United
10	MF	Pokklaw Anan	4 March 1991 (aged 22)			(Football Association of Thailand) Police United
12	MF	Charyl Chappuis	12 January 1992 (aged 21)			(Football Association of Thailand) Buriram United
13	DF	Narubadin Weerawatnodom	12 July 1994 (aged 19)			(Football Association of Thailand) BEC Tero Sasana
14	MF	Pakorn Prempak	2 February 1993 (aged 20)			(Football Association of Thailand) Police United
15	DF	Pravinwat Boonyong	13 February 1990 (aged 23)			(Football Association of Thailand) Bangkok Glass
17	MF	Chutipol Thongthae	23 January 1991 (aged 22)			(Football Association of Thailand) Ratchaburi
18	MF	Chanathip Songkrasin	5 October 1993 (aged 20)			(Football Association of Thailand) BEC Tero Sasana
20	FW	Chananan Pombuppha	17 April 1992 (aged 21)			(Football Association of Thailand) Osotspa Saraburi
22	GK	Chanin Sae-Eae	5 July 1992 (aged 21)			(Football Association of Thailand) Pattaya United
23	MF	Tanaboon Kesarat	21 September 1993 (aged 20)			(Football Association of Thailand) BEC Tero Sasana
26	GK	Kawin Thamsatchanan	26 January 1990 (aged 23)			(Football Association of Thailand) Muangthong United
28	GK	Ukrit Wongmeema	9 July 1991 (aged 22)			(Football Association of Thailand) Ratchaburi
24	MF	Kroekrit Thaweekarn	19 November 1990 (aged 23)			(Football Association of Thailand) Chonburi
30	MF	Sarawut Masuk	3 June 1990 (aged 23)			(Football Association of Thailand) Muangthong United

=== Cambodia ===
Head coach: (South Korea) Lee Tae-Hoon

No.	Pos.	Player	Date of birth (age)	Caps	Goals	Club
1	GK	Sou Yaty	17 December 1991 (aged 21)			(Football Federation of Cambodia) Phnom Penh Crown
2	DF	Sok Sovan	5 April 1992 (aged 21)			(Football Federation of Cambodia) Boeung Ket Rubber Field
6	DF	Touch Pancharong	5 March 1990 (aged 23)			(Football Federation of Cambodia) Boeung Ket Rubber Field
7	FW	Prak Mony Udom	24 March 1994 (aged 19)			(Football Federation of Cambodia) Svay Rieng
8	MF	Thierry Chantha Bin	1 June 1991 (aged 22)			(Football Federation of Cambodia) Phnom Penh Crown
9	FW	Sok Pheng	5 September 1990 (aged 23)			(Football Federation of Cambodia) Boeung Ket Rubber Field
11	MF	Chan Vathanaka	23 January 1994 (aged 19)			(Football Federation of Cambodia) Boeung Ket Rubber Field
12	MF	Sos Suhana	4 April 1992 (aged 21)			(Football Federation of Cambodia) Phnom Penh Crown
14	DF	Ke Vannak	20 August 1993 (aged 20)			(Football Federation of Cambodia) National Defense Ministry
15	DF	Rous Samoeun	20 December 1994 (aged 18)			(Football Federation of Cambodia) Boeung Ket Rubber Field
16	MF	Chhun Sothearath (c)	2 February 1990 (aged 23)			(Football Federation of Cambodia) Boeung Ket Rubber Field
17	MF	Chhin Chhoeun	9 April 1992 (aged 21)			(Football Federation of Cambodia) National Defense Ministry
21	FW	Phuong Soksana	2 March 1992 (aged 21)			(Football Federation of Cambodia) National Defense Ministry
22	GK	Sar Sophea	14 October 1992 (aged 21)			(Football Federation of Cambodia) Svay Rieng
23	DF	Khek Khemrin	10 October 1992 (aged 21)			(Football Federation of Cambodia) National Defense Ministry
26	MF	Srey Udom	30 November 1992 (aged 21)			(Football Federation of Cambodia) National Police Commissary
