= Football at the 2013 Islamic Solidarity Games =

Tournament details
- Host country: Indonesia
- Dates: 19 – 29 September
- Teams: 7 (from 3 confederations)
- Venues: 2 (in 1 host city)

Final positions
- Champions: Morocco (1st title)
- Runners-up: Indonesia
- Third place: Turkey
- Fourth place: Saudi Arabia

Tournament statistics
- Matches played: 13
- Goals scored: 34 (2.62 per match)
- Top scorer(s): (Turkey) Yakup Alkan (5 goals)

Football at the 2013 Islamic Solidarity Games was a football competition held in Indonesia from 19 to 29 September 2013.

== Teams ==
The tournament was contested by the U23 national teams of the participating countries. Morocco and Turkey participated with U20 teams.

- Indonesia (hosts)
- Iraq
- Morocco U20
- Palestine
- Saudi Arabia
- Syria
- Turkey U20

== Venues ==
(Indonesia) Palembang
Gelora Sriwijaya	Bumi Sriwijaya
Capacity: 36,000	Capacity: 6,000
Football at the 2013 Islamic Solidarity Games is located in Palembang

== Squads ==
For the men's tournament, each nation submitted a squad of 23 players, 20 of whom had to be born on or after 1 January 1990, and three of whom could be overage players. A minimum of two goalkeepers (plus one optional alternate goalkeeper) had to be included in the squad.

== Group stage ==
=== Group A ===
Team	Pld	W	D	L	GF	GA	GD	Pts	Qualification
Turkey	3	1	2	0	7	6	+1	5	Semi-finals
Saudi Arabia	3	0	3	0	4	4	0	3	Semi-finals
Syria	3	0	3	0	4	4	0	3	
Iraq	3	0	2	1	4	5	−1	2	

Source: Islamic Solidarity Games
19 September 2013
15:30 WIB

Saudi Arabia	1–1	Syria
	Report

Gelora Sriwijaya Stadium, Palembang
Referee: Ahmed Al-Kaaf (Oman)
19 September 2013
15:30 WIB

Iraq	2–3	Turkey
Kalaf 13'; Salah 68'	Report	Alkan 57', 90+4'; Nişancı 85'

Bumi Sriwijaya Stadium, Palembang
Referee: Ilgiz Tantashev (Uzbekistan)

23 September 2013
15:30 WIB

Turkey	1–1	Saudi Arabia
Baydemir 7'		Al-Safari 14'

Gelora Sriwijaya Stadium, Palembang
Referee: Jawad Assi (Palestine)
23 September 2013
15:30 WIB

Iraq	0–0	Syria

Bumi Sriwijaya Stadium, Palembang
Referee: Xaypaseuth Phongsanit (Laos)

25 September 2013
15:30 WIB

Saudi Arabia	2–2	Iraq
Jamaan 34'; Sahimi 43'		Waleed 48'; Kalaf 54'

Gelora Sriwijaya Stadium, Palembang
Referee: Rosy Faulur (Indonesia)
25 September 2013
15:30 WIB

Syria	3–3	Turkey
Bayouk 60'; Mido 61'; Aljwayed 77'		Alkan 22'; Güncan 51', 89'

Bumi Sriwijaya Stadium, Palembang
Referee: Ilgiz Tantashev (Uzbekistan)

=== Group B ===
Team	Pld	W	D	L	GF	GA	GD	Pts	Qualification
Morocco	2	1	0	1	3	2	+1	3	Semi-finals
Indonesia	2	1	0	1	2	2	0	3	Semi-finals
Palestine	2	1	0	1	3	4	−1	3	

Source: Islamic Solidarity Games
19 September 2013
20:45 WIB

Indonesia	1–0	Morocco
Eko 60'	Report

Gelora Sriwijaya Stadium, Palembang
Referee: Falah Abed Saad (Iraq)

23 September 2013
19:00 WIB

Morocco	3–1	Palestine

Gelora Sriwijaya Stadium, Palembang
Referee: Phung Dinh Dung (Vietnam)

25 September 2013
20:45 WIB

Palestine	2–1	Indonesia
Nu'man 16', 62' (pen.)		Sunarto 30' (pen.)

Gelora Sriwijaya Stadium, Palembang
Referee: Safwan Othman (Syria)

== Knockout stage ==
Semi-finals
27 September – Palembang
Turkey	0 (6)
Indonesia (p)	0 (7)
27 September – Palembang
Morocco	1
Saudi Arabia	0

Gold medal
29 September – Palembang
Indonesia	1
Morocco	2
Bronze medal
29 September – Palembang
Turkey	2
Saudi Arabia	1

=== Semi-finals ===
27 September 2013
15:30 WIB

Turkey	0–0 (a.e.t.)	Indonesia
Penalties
Güncan (penalty scored); Hırçın (penalty scored); Katanalp (penalty scored); Çeşmeli (penalty scored); Alkan (penalty missed); Say (penalty scored); Dervişler (penalty scored); Değirmenci (penalty missed)	6–7	(penalty scored) Alam; (penalty scored) Michiels; (penalty scored) Lestusen; (penalty scored) Tuasalamony; (penalty missed) Sunarto; (penalty scored) Eko; (penalty scored) Gatra; (penalty scored) Kusnandar

Gelora Sriwijaya Stadium, Palembang
Referee: Xaypaseuth Phongsanit (Laos)

27 September 2013
19:30 WIB

Morocco	1–0 (a.e.t.)	Saudi Arabia
El Karti 98'

Gelora Sriwijaya Stadium, Palembang

=== Bronze medal match ===
29 September 2013
15:30 WIB

Turkey	2–1	Saudi Arabia
Alkan 12', 19'		Abdulrahman 53'

Gelora Sriwijaya Stadium, Palembang
Referee: Rosy Faulur (Indonesia)

=== Gold medal match ===
29 September 2013
20:45 WIB

Indonesia	1–2	Morocco
Tuasalamony 8' (pen.)		El Hassouni 71'; El Karti 83'

Gelora Sriwijaya Stadium, Palembang
Referee: Ahmed Al-Kaaf (Oman)

== Medalists ==
Event	Gold	Silver	Bronze
	Morocco; Adnan El Assimi; Mehdi Aït Oumzil; Mohamed Chibi; Ali Rachdi; Mohamed El Harouali; Ayoub Kasmi; Mohamed Saidi; Amine Dinar; Badr Banoun; Youssef Jamaaoui; Youssef El Jaaoui; Bouazza Bouden; Walid El Karti; Anas El Asbahi; Badreddine Benachour; Reda El Nouali; Omar Atiallah; Adam Ennafati; Youssef El Saidi; Sofiane Bahja; Driss Fettouhi; Ayoub Boucheta; Othmane Yassine; Adnan El Ouardi; Abdelkabir El Ouadi; Hamza Hafidi	Indonesia; Agung Supriyanto; Aldaier Makatindu; Syamsir Alam; Alfin Tuasalamony; Andik Vermansyah; Andri Ibo; Andritany Ardhiyasa; Bayu Gatra; David Laly; Dedi Kusnandar; Diego Michiels; Fandi Eko; Johan Alfarizi; Kurnia Meiga; Manahati Lestusen; Oktovianus Maniani; Ramdhani Lestaluhu; Rasyid Bakri; Shahar Ginanjar; Seftia Hadi; Sunarto; Syahrizal Syahbuddin; Syahroni	Turkey; Abdurrahman Ayhanoğlu; Ahmet Güney; Ali Say; Çağatay Çeken; Cantuğ Temel; Efe Balkanlı; Erdi Güncan; Göktuğ Yapıcı; Hayrullah Mert Akyüz; İbrahim Hırçın; Melih Rahman Nişancı; Oğuzhan Durmuş Çeşmeli; Okan Baydemir; Orkun Dervişler; Ozan Arif Önal; Uğur Balkanlı; Rasimcan Değirmenci; Samet Katanalp; Yakup Alkan

== Final ranking ==
Pos	Team	Pld	W	D	L	GF	GA	GD	Pts
1	Morocco	4	3	0	1	6	3	+3	9
2	Indonesia	4	1	1	2	3	4	−1	4
3	Turkey	5	2	2	1	7	6	+1	8
4	Saudi Arabia	5	0	3	2	5	7	−2	3
5	Palestine	2	1	0	1	3	4	−1	3
6	Syria	3	0	3	0	4	4	0	3
7	Iraq	3	0	2	1	4	5	−1	2

== Statistics ==
=== Goalscorers ===
There were 34 goals scored in 13 matches, for an average of 2.62 goals per match.

5 goals

- U20 Yakup Alkan

2 goals

- U23 Amjad Kalaf
- U20 Walid El Karti
- U23 Ashraf Nu'man
- U20 Erdi Güncan

1 goal

- U23 Amjad Waleed
- U23 Alghamdi Abdulrahman
- U23 Abdulrahman Al-Safari
- U23 Saleh Mohammed Jamaan
- U23 Omar Salman Sahimi
- U23 Alfin Tuasalamony
- U23 Fandi Eko Utomo
- U23 Sunarto
- U20 Ayman El Hassouni
- U23 Muhammad Bash Bayouk
- U23 Hamid Mido
- U23 Hussein Aljwayed
- U20 Luay Salah
- U20 Melih Rahman Nişancı
- U20 Okan Baydemir
