= Mohamed Saidi =

Moroccan footballer

Personal information
- Date of birth: 14 October 1994 (age 32)
- Place of birth: Casablanca, Morocco
- Position: Defender

Team information
- Current team: Wydad Casablanca
- Number: 24

Senior career*
Years	Team	Apps	(Gls)
2013–2015	Wydad Casablanca		
2015–2018	Chabab Rif Al Hoceima		
2018	FUS		
- * Club domestic league appearances and goals

Mohamed Saidi (Arabic: محمد السعيدي; born 14 October 1994) is a Moroccan professional footballer, who plays as a defender for Wydad Casablanca.

== International career ==
In January 2014, coach Hassan Benabicha, invited him to be a part of the Moroccan squad for the 2014 African Nations Championship. He helped the team to top group B after drawing with Burkina Faso and Zimbabwe and defeating Uganda. The team was eliminated from the competition at the quarter-final zone after losing to Nigeria.

== Honours ==
=== International ===
Morocco

- Islamic Solidarity Games: 2013
