= Amine Dinar =

Moroccan footballer (born 1995)

Personal information
- Date of birth: 13 June 1995 (age 31)
- Place of birth: Rabat, Morocco
- Height: 1.83 m (6 ft 0 in)
- Position: Defensive midfielder

Team information
- Current team: FUS Rabat
- Number: 32

Youth career
- 2001–2003: FUS Rabat
- 2003–2005: Sahel SC
- 2005–2007: Olympic FC
- 2007–2009: Delta Telestar
- 2009–2010: FC Lewai
- 2010–2011: FC Boca Libreville
- 2011–2012: FAR Rabat

Senior career*
Years	Team	Apps	(Gls)
2012–2013	FAR Rabat	11	(4)
2013–2014	Paris Saint-Germain II	8	(1)
2013–2015	Paris Saint-Germain	0	(0)
2014	→ Créteil (loan)	12	(0)
2014–2015	→ Paris FC (loan)	15	(1)
2015–2016	Red Star	4	(0)
2016	→ Amiens (loan)	11	(1)
2019–2020	Perth Azzurri		
2020–2021	Lokomotiv Cove FC		
2025-	FUS Rabat II	0	(0)

International career
2011–2012	Morocco U17	9	(3)
2012–2013	Morocco U20	5	(0)
2013–2015	Morocco U23	5	(0)
2012–2013	Morocco	2	(0)
Medal record
Men's football
Representing Morocco
UNAF U-17 Tournament
Winner	2011 Morocco
Islamic Solidarity Games
Winner	2013 Indonesia
- * Club domestic league appearances and goals

Amine Dinar (Arabic: أمين دينار; born 13 June 1995) is a Moroccan professional footballer who plays as a defensive midfielder for Botola Pro club FUS Rabat.

== Early life and youth career ==
Dinar was born in Rabat, Morocco. He spent part of his youth in Tunisia, Niger and Gabon due to his father's diplomatic career. He started playing football at FUS Rabat before joining various clubs in Africa, including Sahel SC and Olympic FC in Niger, Delta Telestar, FC Lewai and FC Boca Libreville in Gabon. In 2011, Dinar returned to Morocco and joined the youth academy of FAR Rabat.

== Club career ==
=== FAR Rabat ===
He made his senior debut during the 2012–13 season, scoring 4 goals in 11 appearances. His performances caught the attention of French club Paris Saint-Germain, leading to a transfer in 2013.

=== Paris Saint-Germain ===
Dinar joined Paris Saint-Germain from FAR Rabat on 1 July 2013 on a three-year contract. He did not make any competitive appearances for the club. During the 2014 January transfer window, he was loaned to US Créteil-Lusitanos until the end of the season. He then joined Paris FC on loan for the 2014–15 season.

=== Red Star ===
In the summer of 2015, Dinar permanently transferred to Red Star FC. In January 2016, he was loaned to Amiens SC until the end of the 2015–16 season, where he made 11 appearances and scored 1 goal, helping the club secure promotion to Ligue 2.

=== Early retirement and college soccer ===
In June 2016, Dinar announced his retirement from professional football at the age of 21, citing recurring knee injuries and growing disillusionment with the world of football.

Later that year, he enrolled at San Francisco State University, where he trained with the San Francisco State Gators soccer team. Although not eligible for NCAA competition, he took part in friendly matches and served as an assistant coach.

=== Return to football ===
Although he retired from professional football in June 2016, Dinar remained determined to return to the game. In February 2017, he began training with MLS club San Jose Earthquakes. Having been a free agent for several months, he reiterated his desire to continue playing football. He subsequently spent a month on trial with the club but was not offered a contract.

After leaving the United States, Dinar continued playing at amateur level in Australia. He represented Perth Azzurri SC from 2019 to 2020 before joining Lokomotiv Cove FC in 2020.

In September 2025, Dinar signed with FUS Rabat for the 2025–26 season. He was registered with the reserve team and also held a strategic advisory role at the club. Dinar signed a new one-season contract in September 2026.

== International career ==
=== Youth career ===
Dinar represented Morocco at various youth levels, starting with the U17 team. In 2011, he won the UNAF U-17 Tournament.

Although Dinar was called up to the U20 team for the 2013 Islamic Solidarity Games in Indonesia, he was unable to participate due to PSG's refusal to release him, as the tournament took place outside of FIFA's official international break. Despite not playing, he remained officially listed as part of the squad and was credited with a gold medal following Morocco's victory in the competition.

=== Senior career ===
Dinar earned his first cap for the senior national football team on 12 December 2012, after coming on as a substitute in the 3–0 win over Niger in a friendly match. His second and final appearance for the senior team came on 6 March 2013, when he played as a substitute in a 2–1 win over Mali.

== Career statistics ==
=== Club ===
Appearances and goals by club, season and competition
Club	Season	League			National cup (Note: Includes Throne Cup, Coupe de France)		League cup (Note: Includes Coupe de la Ligue)		Continental (Note: Includes UEFA Champions League)		Other (Note: Includes Trophée des Champions)		Total	
Club	Season	Division	Apps	Goals	Apps	Goals	Apps	Goals	Apps	Goals	Apps	Goals	Apps	Goals
FAR Rabat	2012–13	Botola Pro	11	4	0	0	—		—		—		11	4
Paris Saint-Germain II	2013–14	Championnat de France Amateur	8	1	—		—		—		—		8	1
Paris Saint-Germain	2013–14	Ligue 1	0	0	0	0	0	0	0	0	0	0	0	0
Paris Saint-Germain	2014–15	Ligue 1	0	0	0	0	0	0	0	0	0	0	0	0
Paris Saint-Germain	Total		0	0	0	0	0	0	0	0	0	0	0	0
Créteil (loan)	2013–14	Ligue 2	12	0	0	0	0	0	—		—		12	0
Paris FC (loan)	2014–15	Championnat National	15	1	0	0	—		—		—		15	1
Red Star	2015–16	Ligue 2	4	0	0	0	0	0	—		—		4	0
Amiens SC (loan)	2015–16	Championnat National	11	1	0	0	—		—		—		11	1
Perth SC	2019	NPL Western Australia	—	—	—	—	—		—		—	—	—	—
Perth SC	2020	NPL Western Australia	—	—	—	—	—		—		—		—	—
Perth SC	Total		—	—	—	—	—		—		—		—	—
Lokomotiv Cove	2020	ESFA Premier League	—	—	—		—		—		—		—	—
Lokomotiv Cove	2021	ESFA Premier League	—	—	—		—		—		—		—	—
Lokomotiv Cove	Total		—	—	—		—		—		—		—	—
FUS Rabat II	2025–26	Amateurs I	0	0	—		—		—		—		0	0
FUS Rabat II	2026–27	Amateurs I	0	0	—		—		—		—		0	0
FUS Rabat II	Total		0	0	—		—		—		—		0	0
Career total			61	7	0	0	0	0	0	0	0	0	61	7

=== International ===
Appearances and goals by national team and year
National team	Year	Apps	Goals
Morocco	2012	1	0
Morocco	2013	1	0
Total		2	0

== Honours ==
FAR Rabat

- Botola Pro runner-up: 2012-2013
- Throne Cup runner-up: 2012

Paris Saint-Germain

- Trophée des Champions: 2013, 2014

Paris FC

- Championnat National runner-up: 2014-2015

Perth Azzurri SC

- NPL Western Australia Premiership: 2019
- NPL Western Australia Championship: 2019

Morocco U17

- UNAF U-17 Tournament: 2011

Morocco U20

- Islamic Solidarity Games: 2013

== Post-playing career ==
After retiring from football, Dinar moved into business and sports administration, holding executive and advisory roles in consulting, real estate and football organizations.

In 2025, Dinar joined the Board of Advisors at Chicago Football Club, the parent company of Chicago House AC and Westfield FC.

== Personal life ==
Dinar has Italian ancestry from Trapani, Sicily and Moroccan Jewish heritage, both through his maternal grandmother.

He earned a Master of International Relations from the University of Western Australia and speaks Arabic, English, French, Spanish and Tamazight fluently.
