= Tulehu =

- Village
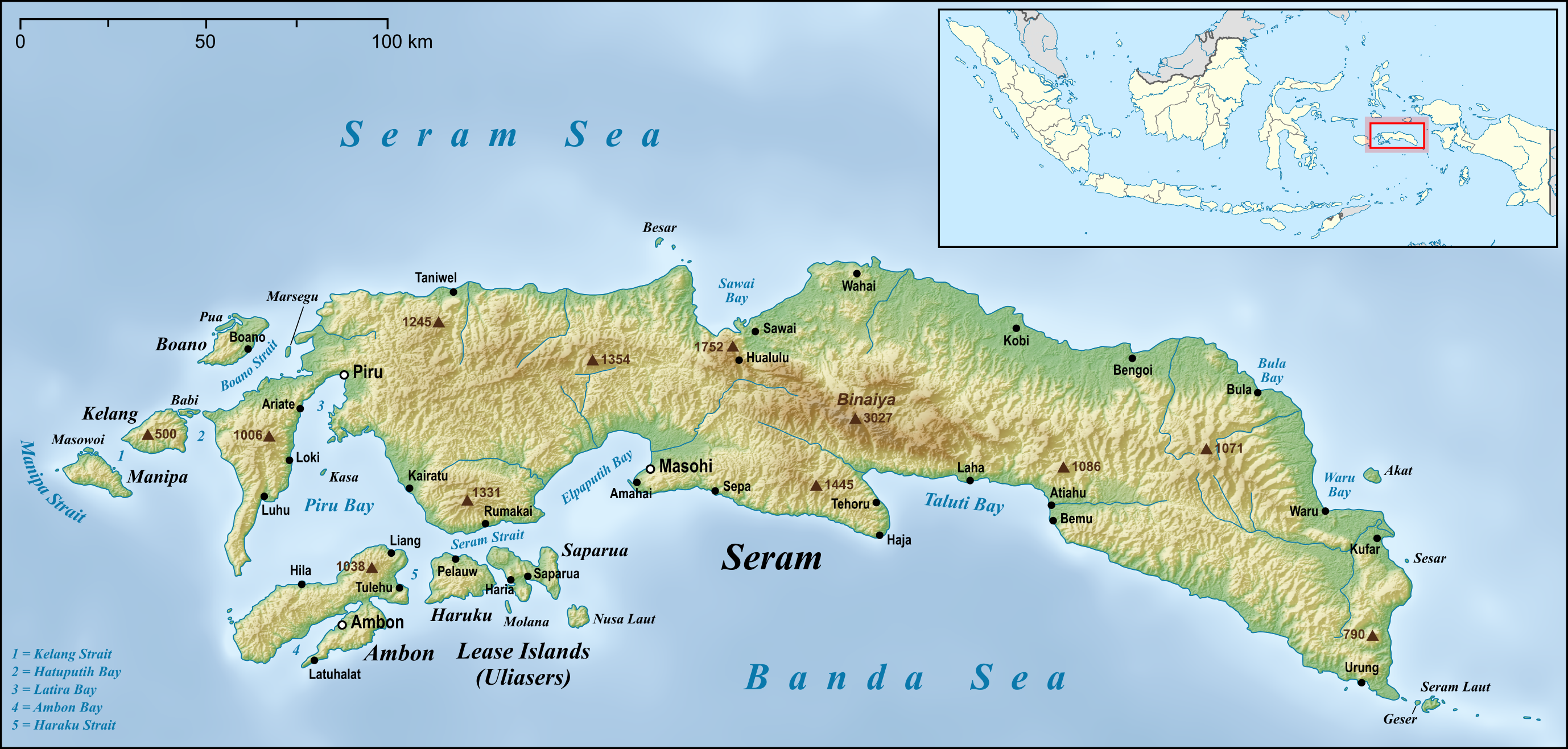
- Location in Seram, Maluku Islands and Indonesia Tulehu (Maluku) Tulehu (Indonesia)
- Coordinates: 3°35′32″S 128°20′6″E
- Country: Indonesia
- Province: Maluku
- Regency: Central Maluku
- Town: Salahutu

Area
  - Total: 2,399 km^{2} (926 sq mi)
- Elevation: 31 m (102 ft)
- Time zone: UTC+9 (IEST)
- Postcode: 97582
- Area code: (+62) 914

Tulehu (Indonesian pronunciation: [t̪uˈlehu]) is a village in Salahutu, Central Maluku Regency, Maluku, Indonesia.

Residents of Tulehu and surrounding areas speak the Tulehu language, which differs slightly in dialect from one village to the next.

== Sport ==
Despite its relatively small size, Tulehu is known as the birthplace of several Indonesian footballers, including Hendra Bayauw, Hasiym Kipuw, Ramdani Lestaluhu, Alfin Tuasalamony, and Imran Nahumarury. The government has plans to allocate 2 Billion Rupiah (Rps) in the coming years to support development of football talent in Tulehu. Football is a popular sport in the village, and economically stable residents are required to donate a football annually to the local organization to support children's access to football practice.

=== In film ===
The 2014 Indonesian film Cahaya Dari Timur: Beta Maluku was based on a book called Jalan Lain ke Tulehu (other way to Tulehu). Both the book and film deal with the Maluku sectarian conflict and aftermath, with the book being written by a journalist who was trapped in Tulehu while it was happening. The film is about the events and details how football suffered during the conflict but also helped rebuild afterwards. Most of the scenes and actors from Cahaya Dari Timur: Beta Maluku are from Tulehu.

== Culture and Religion ==
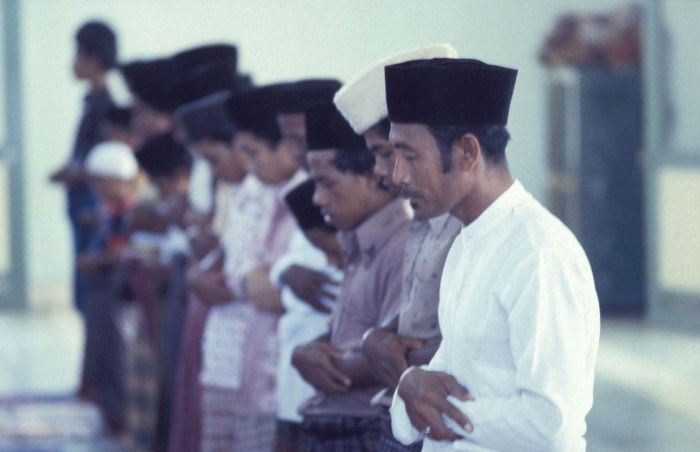
Men praying at the Mosque, 1980

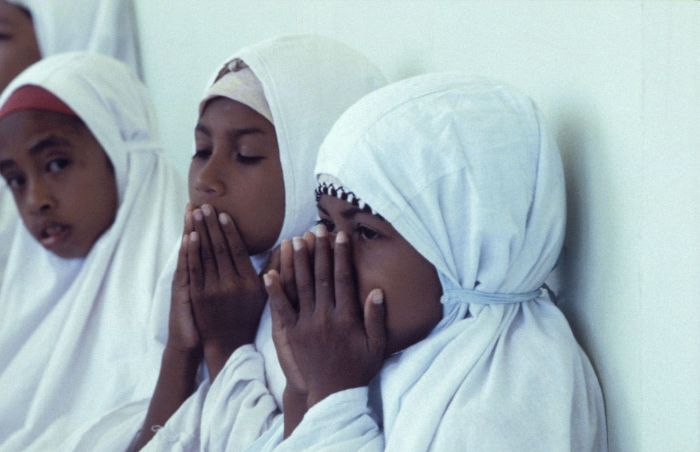
Girls praying at the Mosque, 1980

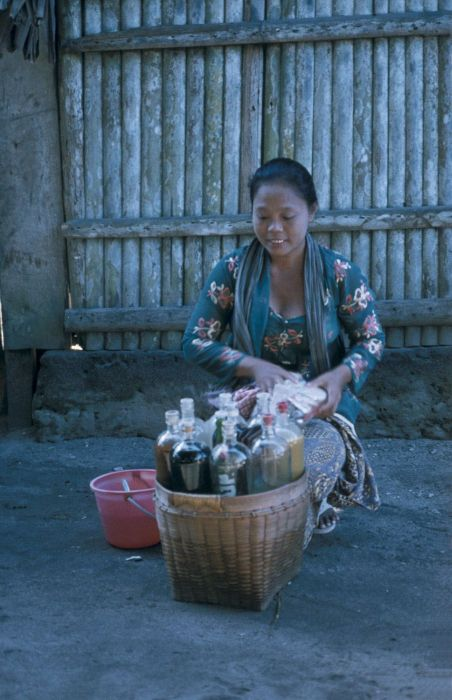
Woman selling medicine on the street, 1980

All of the residents of Tulehu are Muslim with Islam playing a prominent role in public and private life. The Mesjid Jelu Tulehu is the biggest mosque and building in the village.
