= Hamza Hafidi =

Moroccan footballer (born 1993)

Personal information
- Date of birth: 9 February 1993 (age 33)
- Place of birth: Meknes, Morocco
- Height: 1.84 m (6 ft 1/2 in)
- Position: Attacking midfielder

Youth career
- Auxerre

Senior career*
Years	Team	Apps	(Gls)
2012–2015	Angers	1	(0)
2013–2014	→ Carquefou (loan)	23	(1)
2016–2022	Le Mans	125	(8)
2022–2023	La Nucía	13	(0)
2023–2024	Cholet	15	(2)
2024–2026	Cannes	30	(2)
- * Club domestic league appearances and goals as of 16 May 2026

Hamza Hafidi (Arabic: حمزة حفيظي; born 9 February 1993) is a Moroccan professional footballer who plays as a midfielder.

== Club career ==
Hafidi signed his first professional contract with Ligue 2 side Angers in June 2013. He had made his debut for the team a few months before, in a 2–1 home defeat against Clermont Foot in January 2013.

On 11 August 2016, Hafidi joined Le Mans.

On 8 July 2024, Hafidi signed for Cannes.

== Honours ==
=== International ===
Morocco

- Islamic Solidarity Games: 2013
