= Yakup Alkan =

Turkish footballer

Personal information
- Date of birth: 3 March 1992 (age 34)
- Place of birth: Istanbul, Turkey
- Height: 1.86 m (6 ft 1 in)
- Position: Striker

Senior career*
Years	Team	Apps	(Gls)
2010–2011	Kartal Belediyespor		
2012	Cekmeköyspor		
2012–2015	Tuzlaspor		
2015–2023	Yeni Malatyaspor	20	
2016	→ Menemen (loan)	2	(0)
2016–2017	→ Çorum (loan)	37	(20)
2017	→ Orduspor (loan)	1	(0)
2017–2018	→ Diyarbekirspor (loan)	23	(5)
2018–2019	→ Çorum (loan)	32	(21)
2019–2020	→ Kocaelispor (loan)	26	(14)
2020	→ Çorum (loan)	1	(0)
2020–2021	→ Fethiyespor (loan)	31	(13)
2021–2022	→ Ergene Velimeşe (loan)	36	(10)
2023	Şanlıurfaspor	13	(5)

International career
- Istanbul
- * Club domestic league appearances and goals

Yakup Alkan (born 3 March 1992) is a Turkish footballer who last played as a striker for Şanlıurfaspor.

== Early life ==
Alkan was born and raised in Istanbul, Turkey.

== Club career ==
In 2012, Alkan signed for Turkish side Tuzlaspor, helping the club achieve promotion. He attracted media attention after helping them win against three Turkish top flight sides in the Turkish Cup. In 2016, Alkan signed for Turkish side Çorum, where he was regarded as one of the club's most important players. In 2019, he signed for Turkish side Kocaelispor.

== International career ==
Alkan played for the Istanbul football team at the UEFA Region's Cup and represented Turkey internationally at the Islamic Solidarity Games, where he scored against Syria, Iraq, and Saudi Arabia.

== Personal life ==
Alkan has been married and has a son.
