= Football at the Islamic Solidarity Games =

- Founded: 2005
- Region: International (member countries of the OIC)
- Teams: 19 (from 3 confederations)
- Current champions: Turkey (1st title)
- Most championships: Azerbaijan; Morocco; Saudi Arabia; Turkey (1 title each)

The Islamic Solidarity Games are a regional multi-sport event held between nations from the Muslim world. A men's football tournament has been held at every session of the Games since the first edition in 2005. Since the 2013 edition, the tournament has been limited to under-23 teams, plus up to three overage players for each squad.

There was no football tournament at the 2025 Games, with futsal being played instead.

== Summaries ==
The following table gives an overview of medal winners in football at the Islamic Solidarity Games.

| Year | Host | Final | | | Third-place game | | |
| Year | Host | Gold Medal | Score | Silver Medal | Bronze Medal | Score | Fourth Place |
|---|---|---|---|---|---|---|---|
National teams tournament (2005)
| 2005; Details | (Saudi Arabia); Mecca | Saudi Arabia | 1–0 | Morocco B | Iran B | 0–0 (a.e.t.) (5–3) on penalties | Syria |
Under-23 National teams tournament (2010–present)
| 2010 | (Iran); Tehran | Cancelled | | | | | |
| 2013; Details | (Indonesia); Palembang | Morocco | 2–1 | Indonesia | Turkey | 2–1 | Saudi Arabia |
| 2017; Details | (Azerbaijan); Baku | Azerbaijan | 2–1 | Oman | Algeria | 2–0 | Cameroon |
| 2021; Details | (Turkey); Konya | Turkey | 1–0 | Saudi Arabia | Azerbaijan | 0–0 (a.e.t.) (4–3) on penalties | Algeria |
| 2025 | (Saudi Arabia); Riyadh | No football tournament | | | | | |
| 2029 | (Malaysia); Shah Alam | To be announced | | | | | |

== Medal table ==
| Rank | Nation | Gold | Silver | Bronze | Total |
|---|---|---|---|---|---|
| 1 | Morocco | 1 | 1 | 0 | 2 |
| 1 | Saudi Arabia | 1 | 1 | 0 | 2 |
| 3 | Azerbaijan | 1 | 0 | 1 | 2 |
| 3 | Turkey | 1 | 0 | 1 | 2 |
| 5 | Indonesia | 0 | 1 | 0 | 1 |
| 5 | Oman | 0 | 1 | 0 | 1 |
| 7 | Algeria | 0 | 0 | 1 | 1 |
| 7 | Iran | 0 | 0 | 1 | 1 |
| Totals (8 entries) | | 4 | 4 | 4 | 12 |

== Participating nations ==
Legend

- 1st – Champions
- 2nd – Runners-up
- 3rd – Third place
- 4th – Fourth place
- GS – Group stage
- q – Qualified
- — Hosts

| Team | (Saudi Arabia) 2005 | (Iran) 2010 | (Indonesia) 2013 | (Azerbaijan) 2017 | (Turkey) 2021 | (Saudi Arabia) 2025 | Years |
|---|---|---|---|---|---|---|---|
| Algeria | QF | | | 3rd | 4th | | 3 |
| Azerbaijan | | | | 1st | 3rd | | 2 |
| Cameroon | | | | 4th | GS | | 2 |
| Chad | GS | | | | | | 1 |
| Indonesia | | | 2nd | | | | 1 |
| Iran | 3rd | | | | GS | | 2 |
| Iraq | | | GS | | | | 1 |
| Malaysia | QF | | | | | | 1 |
| Mali | QF | | | | | | 1 |
| Morocco | 2nd | | 1st | GS | GS | | 4 |
| Oman | QF | | | 2nd | | | 2 |
| Pakistan | GS | | | | | | 1 |
| Palestine | GS | | GS | GS | | | 3 |
| Saudi Arabia | 1st | | 4th | GS | 2nd | | 4 |
| Senegal | | | | | GS | | 1 |
| Sudan | GS | | | | | | 1 |
| Syria | 4th | | GS | | | | 2 |
| Tajikistan | GS | | | | | | 1 |
| Turkey | | | 3rd | GS | 1st | | 3 |
| Yemen | GS | | | | | | 1 |
| Total | 14 | 0 | 7 | 8 | 8 | | |

== See also ==
- Islam in association football
- FIFA Arab Cup
