= 2016 AFF Championship knockout stage =

The knockout stage was the second and final stage of the 2016 AFF Championship, following the group stage. It was played from 3 to 17 December with the top two teams from each group (two in total) advanced to the knockout stage to compete in a single-elimination tournament. Each tie was played on a home-and-away two-legged basis. The away goals rule, extra time (away goals do not apply in extra time) and penalty shoot-out were used to decide the winner if necessary.

Thailand won 3–2 on aggregate against Indonesia in the final to win their record fifth title.

== Qualified teams ==
The top two placed teams from each of the two groups advanced to the knockout stage. In Group A, Thailand secured the group's top spot with 9 points after defeating hosts Philippines 1–0 in their last match while Indonesia became the group's runners-up with 4 points after beating Singapore 2–1. Meanwhile, in Group B, Vietnam secured the top spot with 9 points after defeating Cambodia 2–1 in their last match while hosts Myanmar became the group's runners-up with 6 points after defeating Malaysia 1–0.

Group	Winners	Runners-up
A	Thailand	Indonesia
B	Vietnam	Myanmar

== Schedule ==
The schedule of each round was as follows.

Round	First leg	Second leg
Semi-finals	3–4 December 2016	7–8 December 2016
Final	14 December 2016	17 December 2016

== Bracket ==
Semi-finals
A2	Indonesia (a.e.t.)	2	2	4
B1	Vietnam	1	2	3
B2	Myanmar	0	0	0
A1	Thailand	2	4	6

Finals
A2	Indonesia	2	0	2
A1	Thailand	1	2	3

Scores after extra time are indicated by (a.e.t.), and penalty shoot-out are indicated by (pen.).

== Semi-finals ==
Team 1	Agg.	Team 2	1st leg	2nd leg
Indonesia	4–3	Vietnam	2–1	2–2
Myanmar	0–6	Thailand	0–2	0–4

=== First leg ===
==== Indonesia vs Vietnam ====
3 December 2016
19:00 UTC+7:00

Indonesia	2–1	Vietnam
Hansamu 7'; Boaz 50' (pen.)	Report	Nguyễn Văn Quyết 17' (pen.)

Pakansari Stadium, Bogor
Attendance: 30,000
Referee: Jarred Gillett (Australia)

Indonesia	Vietnam

GK	1	Kurnia Meiga
CB	2	Beny Wahyudi	(yellow card) 16'
CB	23	Hansamu Yama
CB	3	Abduh Lestaluhu
RM	21	Andik Vermansyah		(substituted off) 90'
CM	25	Manahati Lestusen
CM	19	Bayu Pradana
LM	14	Rizky Pora
RF	8	Stefano Lilipaly
CF	9	Ferdinand Sinaga		(substituted off) 64'
LF	7	Boaz Solossa (c)		(substituted off) 81'
Substitutions:
FW	12	Lerby Eliandry		(substituted on) 64'
MF	6	Evan Dimas		(substituted on) 81'
FW	10	Zulham Zamrun		(substituted on) 90'
Manager:
(Austria) Alfred Riedl

GK	1	Trần Nguyên Mạnh
RB	17	Vũ Văn Thanh
CB	15	Quế Ngọc Hải	(yellow card) 54'
CB	25	Bùi Tiến Dũng
LB	13	Trần Đình Đồng		(substituted off) 89'
RM	10	Nguyễn Văn Quyết
CM	14	Lương Xuân Trường
LM	12	Lê Văn Thắng
AM	8	Nguyễn Trọng Hoàng	(yellow card) 20'	(substituted off) 75'
AM	11	Phạm Thành Lương		(substituted off) 83'
CF	9	Lê Công Vinh (c)
Substitutions:
FW	21	Nguyễn Văn Toàn		(substituted on) 75'
MF	18	Đinh Thanh Trung		(substituted on) 83'
FW	16	Nguyễn Công Phượng		(substituted on) 89'
Manager:
Nguyễn Hữu Thắng

Man of the Match:
Rizky Pora (Indonesia)

Assistant referees:
Anton Shchetinin (Australia)
Park In-sun (South Korea)
Fourth official:
Chan Ming Siu (Hong Kong)

Overall
Statistics	Indonesia	Vietnam
Goals scored	2	1
Total shots	13	11
Shots on target	6	3
Ball possession	40%	60%
Corner kicks	4	7
Fouls committed	10	15
Offsides	0	4
Yellow cards	1	2
Red cards	0	0

==== Myanmar vs Thailand ====
4 December 2016
18:00 UTC+6:30

Myanmar	0–2	Thailand
	Report	Teerasil 24', 55'

Thuwunna Stadium, Yangon
Attendance: 33,122
Referee: Ilgiz Tantashev (Uzbekistan)

Myanmar	Thailand

GK	18	Kyaw Zin Phyo
RB	12	Kyaw Zin Lwin		(substituted off) 73'
CB	3	Zaw Min Tun
CB	15	Phyo Ko Ko Thein
LB	5	Nanda Kyaw
RM	4	David Htan	(yellow card) 39'
CM	6	Yan Aung Kyaw (c)	(yellow card) 59'
CM	11	Myo Ko Tun		(substituted off) 59'
LM	21	Maung Maung Lwin
CF	8	Kaung Sett Naing		(substituted off) 81'
CF	9	Aung Thu
Substitutions:
MF	7	Ye Ko Oo		(substituted on) 59'
FW	22	Than Paing		(substituted on) 73'
FW	20	Suan Lam Mang		(substituted on) 81'
Manager:
(Germany) Gerd Zeise

GK	1	Kawin Thamsatchanan
RB	19	Tristan Do
CB	5	Adison Promrak
CB	15	Koravit Namwiset
LB	3	Theerathon Bunmathan
DM	17	Tanaboon Kesarat
DM	6	Sarach Yooyen	(yellow card) 76'
CM	21	Pokklaw Anan		(substituted off) 75'
AM	18	Chanathip Songkrasin		(substituted off) 80'
AM	4	Kroekrit Thaweekarn		(substituted off) 70'
CF	10	Teerasil Dangda (c)
Substitutions:
FW	9	Siroch Chatthong		(substituted on) 70'
MF	7	Charyl Chappuis		(substituted on) 75'
MF	14	Sarawut Masuk		(substituted on) 80'
Manager:
Kiatisuk Senamuang

Man of the Match:
Teerasil Dangda (Thailand)

Assistant referees:
Ruslan Serazitdinov (Uzbekistan)
Alisher Usmanov (Uzbekistan)
Fourth official:
Aziz Asimov (Uzbekistan)

Overall
Statistics	Myanmar	Thailand
Goals scored	0	2
Total shots	9	16
Shots on target	5	9
Ball possession	35%	65%
Corner kicks	2	4
Fouls committed	18	7
Offsides	2	0
Yellow cards	2	1
Red cards	0	0

=== Second leg ===
==== Vietnam vs Indonesia ====
7 December 2016
19:00 UTC+7

Vietnam	2–2 (a.e.t.)	Indonesia
Vũ Văn Thanh 83'; Vũ Minh Tuấn 90+3'	Report	Lilipaly 54'; Manahati 97' (pen.)

Mỹ Đình National Stadium, Hanoi
Attendance: 40,000
Referee: Fu Ming (China)

Vietnam	Indonesia

GK	1	Trần Nguyên Mạnh	(red card) 76'
RB	17	Vũ Văn Thanh
CB	15	Quế Ngọc Hải	(yellow card) 96'
CB	3	Trương Đình Luật
LB	13	Trần Đình Đồng
RM	21	Nguyễn Văn Toàn		(substituted off) 57'
CM	14	Lương Xuân Trường
LM	10	Nguyễn Văn Quyết		(substituted off) 69'
AM	8	Nguyễn Trọng Hoàng
AM	18	Đinh Thanh Trung		(substituted off) 74'
CF	9	Lê Công Vinh (c)
Substitutions:
MF	6	Vũ Minh Tuấn		(substituted on) 57'
FW	16	Nguyễn Công Phượng		(substituted on) 69'
FW	11	Phạm Thành Lương		(substituted on) 74'
Manager:
Nguyễn Hữu Thắng

GK	1	Kurnia Meiga	(yellow card) 35'
RB	2	Beny Wahyudi
CB	16	Fachrudin Aryanto
CB	23	Hansamu Yama	(yellow card) 82'
LB	3	Abduh Lestaluhu	(yellow card) 74'
RM	21	Andik Vermansyah		(substituted off) 88'
CM	25	Manahati Lestusen
CM	19	Bayu Pradana
LM	14	Rizky Pora
CF	8	Stefano Lilipaly		(substituted off) 85'
CF	7	Boaz Solossa (c)		(substituted off) 72'
Substitutions:
FW	9	Ferdinand Sinaga		(substituted on) 72'
FW	10	Zulham Zamrun		(substituted on) 85'
MF	11	Dedi Kusnandar		(substituted on) 88'
Manager:
(Austria) Alfred Riedl

Man of the Match:
Lê Công Vinh (Vietnam)

Assistant referees:
Ma Ji (China)
Cao Yi (China)
Fourth official:
Wang Di (China)

Overall
Statistics	Vietnam	Indonesia
Goals scored	2	2
Total shots	28	7
Shots on target	7	2
Ball possession	74%	26%
Corner kicks	13	3
Fouls committed	12	22
Offsides	2	4
Yellow cards	1	3
Red cards	1	0

==== Thailand vs Myanmar ====
8 December 2016
19:00 UTC+7

Thailand	4–0	Myanmar
Sarawut 33'; Theerathon 66' (pen.); Siroch 76'; Chanathip 83'	Report

Rajamangala Stadium, Bangkok
Attendance: 43,638
Referee: Adham Makhadmeh (Jordan)

Thailand	Myanmar

GK	1	Kawin Thamsatchanan
RB	19	Tristan Do
CB	5	Adison Promrak
CB	16	Pratum Chuthong
LB	3	Theerathon Bunmathan
DM	17	Tanaboon Kesarat	(substituted off) 60'
DM	6	Sarach Yooyen	(substituted off) 75'
CM	21	Pokklaw Anan
AM	14	Sarawut Masuk
AM	18	Chanathip Songkrasin
CF	10	Teerasil Dangda (c)	(substituted off) 46'
Substitutions:
FW	9	Siroch Chatthong	(substituted on) 46'
DF	36	Pravinwat Boonyong	(substituted on) 60'
MF	7	Charyl Chappuis	(substituted on) 75'
Manager:
Kiatisuk Senamuang

GK	18	Kyaw Zin Phyo
RB	4	David Htan
CB	15	Phyo Ko Ko Thein		(substituted off) 83'
CB	3	Zaw Min Tun
LB	5	Nanda Kyaw	(yellow card) 67'
RM	21	Maung Maung Lwin
CM	6	Yan Aung Kyaw (c)
CM	11	Myo Ko Tun
LM	14	Yan Naing Oo
CF	22	Than Paing		(substituted off) 79'
CF	9	Aung Thu
Substitutions:
FW	20	Suan Lam Mang		(substituted on) 79'
DF	24	Win Min Htut		(substituted on) 83'
Manager:
(Germany) Gerd Zeise

Man of the Match:
Sarawut Masuk (Thailand)

Assistant referees:
Ahmed Al-Roalle (Jordan)
Issa Alamawi (Jordan)
Fourth official:
Ahmad Faisal Al-Ali (Jordan)

Overall
Statistics	Thailand	Myanmar
Goals scored	4	0
Total shots	15	12
Shots on target	5	4
Ball possession	56%	44%
Corner kicks	5	3
Fouls committed	7	13
Offsides	2	1
Yellow cards	0	1
Red cards	0	0

== Final ==
Team 1	Agg.	Team 2	1st leg	2nd leg
Indonesia	2–3	Thailand	2–1	0–2

=== First leg: Indonesia vs Thailand ===
14 December 2016
19:00 UTC+7

Indonesia	2–1	Thailand
Rizky 65'; Hansamu 70'	Report	Teerasil 33'

Pakansari Stadium, Bogor
Attendance: 30,000
Referee: Jumpei Iida (Japan)

Indonesia	Thailand

GK	1	Kurnia Meiga
RB	2	Beny Wahyudi	(substituted off) 70'
CB	16	Fachrudin Aryanto
CB	23	Hansamu Yama
LB	3	Abduh Lestaluhu
RM	21	Andik Vermansyah	(substituted off) 20'
CM	25	Manahati Lestusen
CM	19	Bayu Pradana
LM	14	Rizky Pora
CF	8	Stefano Lilipaly
CF	7	Boaz Solossa (c)	(substituted off) 77'
Substitutions:
FW	10	Zulham Zamrun	(substituted on) 20'
FW	12	Lerby Eliandry	(substituted on) 70'
FW	9	Ferdinand Sinaga	(substituted on) 77'
Manager:
(Austria) Alfred Riedl

GK	1	Kawin Thamsatchanan
RB	19	Tristan Do
CB	5	Adison Promrak
CB	15	Koravit Namwiset
LB	3	Theerathon Bunmathan
RM	14	Sarawut Masuk	(substituted off) 73'
CM	6	Sarach Yooyen
CM	21	Pokklaw Anan	(substituted off) 80'
LM	4	Kroekrit Thaweekarn	(substituted off) 67'
AM	18	Chanathip Songkrasin
CF	10	Teerasil Dangda (c)
Substitutions:
DF	2	Peerapat Notchaiya	(substituted on) 67'
FW	9	Siroch Chatthong	(substituted on) 73'
MF	7	Charyl Chappuis	(substituted on) 80'
Manager:
Kiatisuk Senamuang

Man of the Match:
Stefano Lilipaly (Indonesia)

Assistant referees:
Yagi Akane (Japan)
Shinji Ochi (Japan)
Fourth official:
Takuto Okabe (Japan)

Overall
Statistics	Indonesia	Thailand
Goals scored	2	1
Total shots	11	11
Shots on target	4	3
Ball possession	39%	61%
Corner kicks	3	8
Fouls committed	16	10
Offsides	4	2
Yellow cards	0	0
Red cards	0	0

=== Second leg: Thailand vs Indonesia ===
17 December 2016
19:00 UTC+7:00

Thailand	2–0	Indonesia
Siroch 38', 47'	Report

Rajamangala Stadium, Bangkok
Attendance: 48,000
Referee: Abdulla Hassan (United Arab Emirates)

Thailand	Indonesia

GK	1	Kawin Thamsatchanan
CB	5	Adison Promrak
CB	17	Tanaboon Kesarat
CB	16	Pratum Chuthong
RM	19	Tristan Do
CM	7	Charyl Chappuis	(substituted off) 82'
CM	6	Sarach Yooyen
LM	3	Theerathon Bunmathan
RF	9	Siroch Chatthong	(substituted off) 90'
CF	10	Teerasil Dangda (c)
LF	18	Chanathip Songkrasin	(substituted off) 90+6'
Substitutions:
MF	21	Pokklaw Anan	(substituted on) 82'
MF	14	Sarawut Masuk	(substituted on) 90'
MF	35	Prakit Deeprom	(substituted on) 90+6'
Manager:
Kiatisuk Senamuang

GK	1	Kurnia Meiga	(yellow card) 79'
RB	2	Beny Wahyudi	(yellow card) 17'	(substituted off) 46'
CB	16	Fachrudin Aryanto
CB	23	Hansamu Yama
LB	3	Abduh Lestaluhu	(red card) 90+5'
RM	10	Zulham Zamrun		(substituted off) 64'
CM	25	Manahati Lestusen
CM	19	Bayu Pradana
LM	14	Rizky Pora		(substituted off) 73'
CF	8	Stefano Lilipaly
CF	7	Boaz Solossa (c)
Substitutions:
MF	11	Dedi Kusnandar		(substituted on) 46'
FW	12	Lerby Eliandry		(substituted on) 64'
FW	9	Ferdinand Sinaga		(substituted on) 73'
Manager:
(Austria) Alfred Riedl

Man of the Match:
Chanathip Songkrasin (Thailand)

Assistant referees:
Ahmed Yousuf Al-Hammadi (United Arab Emirates)
Hassan Al-Mahri (United Arab Emirates)
Fourth official:
Yaqoub Al-Hammadi (United Arab Emirates)

Overall
Statistics	Thailand	Indonesia
Goals scored	2	0
Total shots	10	3
Shots on target	6	0
Ball possession	62%	38%
Corner kicks	6	2
Fouls committed	18	20
Offsides	2	1
Yellow cards	0	2
Red cards	0	1
