= 2016 AFF Championship statistics =

Football tournament statistics

These are the statistics for the 2016 AFF Championship.

== Goalscorers ==
6 goals

- (Thailand) Teerasil Dangda

3 goals

- (Indonesia) Boaz Solossa
- (Thailand) Sarawut Masuk
- (Thailand) Siroch Chatthong

2 goals

- (Cambodia) Chan Vathanaka
- (Indonesia) Hansamu Yama
- (Indonesia) Stefano Lilipaly
- (Malaysia) Mohd Amri Yahyah
- (Myanmar) Aung Thu
- (Myanmar) Zaw Min Tun
- (Vietnam) Lê Công Vinh
- (Vietnam) Nguyễn Văn Quyết

1 goal

- (Cambodia) Chrerng Polroth
- (Cambodia) Sos Suhana
- (Indonesia) Andik Vermansyah
- (Indonesia) Fachrudin Aryanto
- (Indonesia) Lerby Eliandry
- (Indonesia) Manahati Lestusen
- (Indonesia) Rizky Pora
- (Malaysia) Syazwan Zainon
- (Myanmar) David Htan
- (Philippines) Misagh Bahadoran
- (Philippines) Phil Younghusband
- (Singapore) Khairul Amri
- (Thailand) Chanathip Songkrasin
- (Thailand) Peerapat Notchaiya
- (Thailand) Theerathon Bunmathan
- (Vietnam) Nguyễn Trọng Hoàng
- (Vietnam) Vũ Minh Tuấn
- (Vietnam) Vũ Văn Thanh

1 own goal

- (Cambodia) Nub Tola (playing against Vietnam)

== Assists ==
4 assists

- (Indonesia) Rizky Pora

3 assists

- (Thailand) Theerathon Bunmathan

2 assist

- (Indonesia) Boaz Solossa
- (Myanmar) Nanda Kyaw
- (Thailand) Sarach Yooyen
- (Vietnam) Nguyễn Trọng Hoàng

1 assist

- (Cambodia) Chan Vathanaka
- (Cambodia) Keo Sokpheng
- (Cambodia) Sok Sovan
- (Indonesia) Benny Wahyudi
- (Indonesia) Stefano Lilipaly
- (Malaysia) Ahmad Hazwan Bakri
- (Malaysia) Baddrol Bakhtiar
- (Malaysia) Safee Sali
- (Myanmar) Than Paing
- (Philippines) Stephan Schröck
- (Singapore) Safuwan Baharudin
- (Thailand) Charyl Chappuis
- (Thailand) Prakit Deeprom
- (Thailand) Sarawut Masuk
- (Vietnam) Đinh Thanh Trung
- (Vietnam) Nguyễn Văn Toàn

== Discipline ==
=== Yellow cards ===
2 yellow cards

- (Indonesia) Benny Wahyudi
- (Indonesia) Fachrudin Aryanto
- (Indonesia) Kurnia Meiga
- (Indonesia) Rudolof Basna
- (Malaysia) Baddrol Bakhtiar
- (Myanmar) David Htan
- (Vietnam) Quế Ngọc Hải

1 yellow card

- (Cambodia) Chhin Chhoeun
- (Cambodia) Nub Tola
- (Cambodia) Rous Samoeun
- (Cambodia) Soeuy Visal
- (Cambodia) Sos Suhana
- (Indonesia) Abduh Lestaluhu
- (Indonesia) Boaz Solossa
- (Indonesia) Evan Dimas
- (Indonesia) Hansamu Yama Pranata
- (Indonesia) Stefano Lilipaly
- (Malaysia) Hazwan Bakri
- (Malaysia) Mohd Amri Yahyah
- (Malaysia) Rizal Ghazali
- (Malaysia) Shahrom Kalam
- (Malaysia) Shahrul Saad
- (Malaysia) Zaquan Adha
- (Myanmar) Aung Thu
- (Myanmar) Hlaing Bo Bo
- (Myanmar) Kyaw Zin Lwin
- (Myanmar) Nanda Kyaw
- (Myanmar) Yan Aung Kyaw
- (Myanmar) Ye Ko Oo
- (Philippines) Manuel Ott
- (Philippines) Mark Hartmann
- (Philippines) Mike Ott
- (Philippines) OJ Porteria
- (Philippines) Stephan Schröck
- (Singapore) Anumanthan Kumar
- (Singapore) Daniel Bennett
- (Singapore) Faritz Hameed
- (Singapore) Hassan Sunny
- (Singapore) Khairul Amri
- (Singapore) Safuwan Baharudin
- (Singapore) Shakir Hamzah
- (Thailand) Adison Promrak
- (Thailand) Kroekrit Thaweekarn
- (Thailand) Prakit Deeprom
- (Thailand) Sarach Yooyen
- (Vietnam) Ngô Hoàng Thịnh
- (Vietnam) Nguyễn Trọng Hoàng
- (Vietnam) Vũ Minh Tuấn

=== Red cards ===
1 red card

- (Indonesia) Abduh Lestaluhu
- (Singapore) Hafiz Abu Sujad
- (Vietnam) Trần Nguyên Mạnh
- (Vietnam) Trương Đình Luật

=== By team ===
Team	Matches	Yellow	Red	Red cards	Player suspensions
Indonesia	7	13	1	Abduh Lestaluhu vs Thailand (straight red)	Fachrudin Aryanto vs Vietnam 1st-leg Rudolof Basna vs Vietnam 1st-leg
Vietnam	5	5	2	Trần Nguyên Mạnh vs Indonesia (straight red); Trương Đình Luật vs Cambodia (straight red)	Trương Đình Luật vs Indonesia 1st-leg Trần Nguyên Mạnh; Quế Ngọc Hải
Singapore	3	7	1	Hafiz Abu Sujad vs Philippines (straight red)	Hafiz Abu Sujad vs Thailand
Malaysia	3	8	0	—N/a	—N/a
Myanmar	5	8	0	—N/a	—N/a
Cambodia	3	5	0	—N/a	—N/a
Philippines	3	5	0	—N/a	—N/a
Thailand	7	4	0	—N/a	—N/a

=== By referee ===
Referee	Country	Matches	Yellow	Red	Red cards	PKs awarded
Masoud Tufaylieh	Syria	2	9	1	1 straight red	0
Çharymyrat Kurbanow	Turkmenistan	1	7	0	—N/a	0
Yu Ming-hsun	Chinese Taipei	1	6	0	—N/a	0
Fu Ming	China	1	5	1	1 straight red	1
Hiroyuki Kimura	Japan	2	4	1	1 straight red	0
Yaqoob Abdul Baki	Oman	3	4	0	—N/a	0
Valentin Kovalenko	Uzbekistan	2	4	0	—N/a	0
Rowan Arumughan	India	1	3	0	—N/a	0
Ilgiz Tantashev	Uzbekistan	1	3	0	—N/a	0
Jarred Gillett	Australia	1	3	0	—N/a	2
Kim Dong-jin	South Korea	1	2	0	—N/a	0
Adham Makhadmeh	Jordan	1	1	0	—N/a	1
Abdulla Hassan	United Arab Emirates	1	0	1	1 straight red	1

== Penalty shoot-outs ==
#	Date	Match	Round	Kicker	Minute	Goal	Goalkeeper	Final result
1	26 November 2016	Myanmar vs Malaysia	Group Stage	(Myanmar) Aung Thu	11'	(penalty missed) Saved	(Malaysia) Khairul Fahmi	Myanmar 1-0 Malaysia
2	3 December 2016	Indonesia vs Vietnam	1st-leg Semi finals	(Vietnam) Nguyễn Văn Quyết	7'	(penalty scored) Goal	(Indonesia) Kurnia Meiga	Indonesia 2-1 Vietnam
3	3 December 2016	Indonesia vs Vietnam	1st-leg Semi finals	(Indonesia) Boaz Solossa	50'	(penalty scored) Goal	(Vietnam) Trần Nguyên Mạnh	Indonesia 2-1 Vietnam
4	7 December 2016	Vietnam vs Indonesia	2nd-leg Semi finals	(Indonesia) Manahati Lestusen	97'	(penalty scored) Goal	(Vietnam) Quế Ngọc Hải	Vietnam 2-2 Indonesia
5	8 December 2016	Thailand vs Myanmar	2nd-leg Semi finals	(Thailand) Theerathon Bunmathan	66'	(penalty scored) Goal	(Myanmar) Kyaw Zin Phyo	Thailand 4-0 Myanmar
6	17 December 2016	Thailand vs Indonesia	2nd-leg Final	(Thailand) Teerasil Dangda	79'	(penalty missed) Saved	(Indonesia) Kurnia Meiga	Thailand 2-0 Indonesia

== Awards ==
=== Man of the Match ===
Rank	Name	Team	Opponent	Awards
1	Lê Công Vinh	Vietnam	Cambodia (GS); Indonesia 2nd-leg (SF)	2
2	Rizky Pora	Indonesia	Vietnam 1st-leg (SF)	1
2	Stefano Lilipaly	Indonesia	Thailand 1st-leg (Final)	1
2	David Htan	Myanmar	Malaysia (GS)	1
2	Zaw Min Tun	Myanmar	Cambodia (GS)	1
2	Phil Younghusband	Philippines	Indonesia (GS)	1
2	Chanathip Songkrasin	Thailand	Singapore (GS)	1
2	Sarawut Masuk	Thailand	Myanmar 2nd-leg (SF)	1
2	Sinthaweechai Hathairattanakool	Thailand	Philippines (GS)	1
2	Teerasil Dangda	Thailand	Myanmar 1st-leg (SF)	1
2	Nguyễn Trọng Hoàng	Vietnam	Malaysia (GS)	1

=== Clean sheets ===
Rank	Name	Team	Opponent	Awards
1	Kawin Thamsatchanan	Thailand	Singapore (GS); Myanmar 1st-leg (SF); Myanmar 2nd-leg (SF); Indonesia 2nd-leg (Finals)	4
2	Roland Müller	Philippines	Singapore (GS)	1
2	Hassan Sunny	Singapore	Philippines (GS)	1
2	Sinthaweechai Hathairattanakool	Thailand	Philippines (GS)	1
2	Trần Nguyên Mạnh	Vietnam	Malaysia (GS)	1
2	Kyaw Zin Phyo	Myanmar	Malaysia (GS)	1

== Overall results ==
Team	Pld	W	D	L	Pts	APts	GF	AGF	GA	AGA	GD	AGD	CS	ACS	YC	AYC	RC	ARC
Thailand	7	6	0	1	18	2.57	15	2.14	4	0.57	+11	1.57	5	0.71	4	0.57	0	0.00
Indonesia	7	3	2	2	11	1.57	12	1.71	13	1.86	−1	−0.14	0	0.00	13	1.86	1	0.14
Vietnam	5	3	1	1	10	2.00	8	1.60	6	1.20	+2	0.40	1	0.20	5	1.00	2	0.40
Myanmar	5	2	0	3	6	1.20	5	1.00	9	1.80	−4	−0.80	1	0.20	8	1.60	0	0.00
Malaysia	3	1	0	2	3	1.00	3	1.00	4	1.33	−1	−0.33	0	0.00	5	1.67	0	0.00
Philippines	3	0	2	1	2	0.67	2	0.67	3	1.00	−1	−0.33	1	0.33	5	1.67	0	0.00
Singapore	3	0	1	2	1	0.33	1	0.33	3	1.00	−2	−0.67	1	0.33	8	2.67	1	0.33
Cambodia	3	0	0	3	0	0.00	4	1.33	8	2.67	−4	−1.33	0	0.00	2	0.67	0	0.00
Total	18^{(1)}	15	3^{(2)}	15	51	1.42	50	1.39	50	1.39	0	0.00	9	0.25	50	1.39	4	0.11

Team(s) rendered in italics represent(s) the host nation(s). The competition's winning team is rendered in bold.
^{(1)} – Total games lost not counted in total games played (total games lost = total games won)
^{(2)} – Total number of games drawn (tied) for all teams = Total number of games drawn (tied) ÷ 2 (both teams involved)
^{(3)} – As per statistical convention in football, matches decided in extra time are counted as wins and losses, while matches decided by penalty shoot-outs are counted as draws.
