= 2016 AFF Championship final =

- Event: 2016 AFF Championship
Indonesia	Thailand
(Indonesia)	(Thailand)
2	3
- on aggregate (Full report)

First leg
Indonesia	Thailand
2	1
- Details
- Date: 14 December 2016
- Venue: Pakansari Stadium, Bogor
- Man of the Match: Stefano Lilipaly (Indonesia)
- Referee: Jumpei Iida (Japan)
- Attendance: 30,000
- Weather: Clear night

Second leg
Thailand	Indonesia
2	0
- Details
- Date: 17 December 2016
- Venue: Rajamangala Stadium, Bangkok
- Man of the Match: Chanathip Songkrasin (Thailand)
- Referee: Abdulla Hassan (United Arab Emirates)
- Attendance: 48,000
- Weather: Clear night

The 2016 AFF Championship final was the final of the 2016 AFF Championship, the 11th edition of the top-level Southeast Asia football tournament organised by the ASEAN Football Federation (AFF).

The final was contested in two-legged home-and-away format between Indonesia and Thailand. The first leg was hosted by Indonesia at the Pakansari Stadium in Bogor on 14 December 2016, while the second leg was hosted by Thailand at the Rajamangala Stadium in Bangkok on 17 December 2016.

== Background ==
Based on previous records, Indonesia had reached the AFF Championship final four times (2000, 2002, 2004 and 2010), finishing runners-up in all attempts. Thailand had reached the AFF Championship final seven times (1996, 2000, 2002, 2007, 2008, 2012 and 2014) and had won the tournament four times (1996, 2000, 2002 and 2014). The two sides last met on 7 December 2010 in the group stage of the 2010 AFF Championship. Indonesia, who began the 2016 AFF Championship as an underdog, was ranked 179 in the FIFA World Rankings and tenth among AFF teams while Thailand, who entered the tournament as a clear favorite, was ranked 146 overall and fourth among AFF teams. Thailand entered the 2016 AFF Championship as four-time ASEAN champions. Thailand was first crowned champions of ASEAN in the 1996 that was held in Singapore with a final score of 1–0 against Malaysia. In the 2000, Thailand had taken home the title through a 4–1 victory against Indonesia. In the 2002, Thailand won against Indonesia through a penalty shoot-out. In the 2007 and 2008, Thailand reached the final to meet Singapore and Vietnam but however lost in the final games. In the 2012, Thailand again failed after losing by 2–3 on aggregate against Singapore. But in the 2014, Thailand managed to return by winning 4–3 on aggregate against Malaysia. The 2016 final was Indonesia's fifth consecutive time contesting an AFF Championship final, after losing four times against Thailand, Singapore and Malaysia.

Up until the beginning of the tournament, Indonesia had just set everything in control after a series of internal upheavals within the PSSI, which cost the country's qualification attempts for the 2018 FIFA World Cup and 2019 AFC Asian Cup. Having just ended the crisis, Indonesia's perpetration was in total disarray and thus they had to take back their old boss, Alfred Riedl, to manage the team and fix the messes. In comparison, Thailand's perpetration was largely smooth and problem-free. Therefore, not many people even imagined Indonesia could progress to the semi-finals, leave alone winning the tournament.

== Route to the final ==
Both Indonesia and Thailand were drawn into Group A of the 2016 AFF Championship, along with powerhouse sides Philippines and Singapore. After winning all three group matches, Thailand finished first in the group. Indonesia finished second in the group to progress to the knockout phase of the tournament. Thailand's first match victory was against Indonesia with a score of 4–2. From there, they continue the path by beating both Singapore and the Philippines by 1–0. Thailand progressed to the semi-finals to face Group B runner-up and subsequent host of Myanmar. In the first-leg in Yangon, Thailand won 2–0 before winning the second-leg in Bangkok by 4–0 with a total aggregate of 6–0. Indonesia's lose their first match against Thailand before drawing 2–2 against the host Philippines. In the third match against Singapore, they won 2–1 before progressing to the semi-finals to face Group B winner of Vietnam. In the first-leg in Bogor, Indonesia won 2–1 before drawing 2–2 in the extra time in the second-leg in Hanoi with a total aggregate of 4–3.

Note: In all results below, the score of the finalist is given first (H: home; A: away).

Indonesia				Round	Thailand			
Opponent	Result			Group stage	Opponent	Result		
Thailand	2–4			Matchday 1	Indonesia	4–2		
Philippines	2–2			Matchday 2	Singapore	1–0		
Singapore	2–1			Matchday 3	Philippines	1–0		
Group A runners-up: Team / Pld / W / D / L / GF / GA / GD / Pts; Thailand / 3 / 3 / 0 / 0 / 6 / 2 / +4 / 9; Indonesia / 3 / 1 / 1 / 1 / 6 / 7 / –1 / 4; Philippines / 3 / 0 / 2 / 1 / 2 / 3 / −1 / 2; Singapore / 3 / 0 / 1 / 2 / 1 / 3 / −2 / 1				Final standings	Group A winners: Team / Pld / W / D / L / GF / GA / GD / Pts; Thailand / 3 / 3 / 0 / 0 / 6 / 2 / +4 / 9; Indonesia / 3 / 1 / 1 / 1 / 6 / 7 / –1 / 4; Philippines / 3 / 0 / 2 / 1 / 2 / 3 / −1 / 2; Singapore / 3 / 0 / 1 / 2 / 1 / 3 / −2 / 1			
Opponent	Agg.	1st leg	2nd leg	Knockout phase	Opponent	Agg.	1st leg	2nd leg
Vietnam	4–3	2–1 (H)	2–2 (a.e.t.) (A)	Semi-finals	Myanmar	6–0	2–0 (A)	4–0 (H)

== Matches ==
=== First leg ===
14 December 2016
19:00 UTC+7

Indonesia	2–1	Thailand
Rizky 65'; Hansamu 70'	Report	Teerasil 33'

Pakansari Stadium, Bogor
Attendance: 30,000
Referee: Jumpei Iida (Japan)

Indonesia	Thailand

GK	1	Kurnia Meiga
RB	2	Beny Wahyudi	(substituted off) 70'
CB	16	Fachrudin Aryanto
CB	23	Hansamu Yama
LB	3	Abduh Lestaluhu
RM	21	Andik Vermansyah	(substituted off) 20'
CM	25	Manahati Lestusen
CM	19	Bayu Pradana
LM	14	Rizky Pora
CF	8	Stefano Lilipaly
CF	7	Boaz Solossa (c)	(substituted off) 77'
Substitutions:
FW	10	Zulham Zamrun	(substituted on) 20'
FW	12	Lerby Eliandry	(substituted on) 70'
FW	9	Ferdinand Sinaga	(substituted on) 77'
Manager:
(Austria) Alfred Riedl

GK	1	Kawin Thamsatchanan
RB	19	Tristan Do
CB	5	Adison Promrak
CB	15	Koravit Namwiset
LB	3	Theerathon Bunmathan
RM	14	Sarawut Masuk	(substituted off) 73'
CM	6	Sarach Yooyen
CM	21	Pokklaw Anan	(substituted off) 80'
LM	4	Kroekrit Thaweekarn	(substituted off) 67'
AM	18	Chanathip Songkrasin
CF	10	Teerasil Dangda (c)
Substitutions:
DF	2	Peerapat Notchaiya	(substituted on) 67'
FW	9	Siroch Chatthong	(substituted on) 73'
MF	7	Charyl Chappuis	(substituted on) 80'
Manager:
Kiatisuk Senamuang

Man of the Match:
Stefano Lilipaly (Indonesia)

Assistant referees:
Yagi Akane (Japan)
Shinji Ochi (Japan)
Fourth official:
Takuto Okabe (Japan)

Overall
Statistics	Indonesia	Thailand
Goals scored	2	1
Total shots	11	11
Shots on target	4	3
Ball possession	39%	61%
Corner kicks	3	8
Fouls committed	16	10
Offsides	4	2
Yellow cards	0	0
Red cards	0	0

=== Second leg ===
17 December 2016
19:00 UTC+7:00

Thailand	2–0	Indonesia
Siroch 38', 47'	Report

Rajamangala Stadium, Bangkok
Attendance: 48,000
Referee: Abdulla Hassan (United Arab Emirates)

Thailand	Indonesia

GK	1	Kawin Thamsatchanan
CB	5	Adison Promrak
CB	17	Tanaboon Kesarat
CB	16	Pratum Chuthong
RM	19	Tristan Do
CM	7	Charyl Chappuis	(substituted off) 82'
CM	6	Sarach Yooyen
LM	3	Theerathon Bunmathan
RF	9	Siroch Chatthong	(substituted off) 90'
CF	10	Teerasil Dangda (c)
LF	18	Chanathip Songkrasin	(substituted off) 90+6'
Substitutions:
MF	21	Pokklaw Anan	(substituted on) 82'
MF	14	Sarawut Masuk	(substituted on) 90'
MF	35	Prakit Deeprom	(substituted on) 90+6'
Manager:
Kiatisuk Senamuang

GK	1	Kurnia Meiga	(yellow card) 79'
RB	2	Beny Wahyudi	(yellow card) 17'	(substituted off) 46'
CB	16	Fachrudin Aryanto
CB	23	Hansamu Yama
LB	3	Abduh Lestaluhu	(red card) 90+5'
RM	10	Zulham Zamrun		(substituted off) 64'
CM	25	Manahati Lestusen
CM	19	Bayu Pradana
LM	14	Rizky Pora		(substituted off) 73'
CF	8	Stefano Lilipaly
CF	7	Boaz Solossa (c)
Substitutions:
MF	11	Dedi Kusnandar		(substituted on) 46'
FW	12	Lerby Eliandry		(substituted on) 64'
FW	9	Ferdinand Sinaga		(substituted on) 73'
Manager:
(Austria) Alfred Riedl

Man of the Match:
Chanathip Songkrasin (Thailand)

Assistant referees:
Ahmed Yousuf Al-Hammadi (United Arab Emirates)
Hassan Al-Mahri (United Arab Emirates)
Fourth official:
Yaqoub Al-Hammadi (United Arab Emirates)

Overall
Statistics	Thailand	Indonesia
Goals scored	2	0
Total shots	10	3
Shots on target	6	0
Ball possession	62%	38%
Corner kicks	6	2
Fouls committed	18	20
Offsides	2	1
Yellow cards	0	2
Red cards	0	1

Thailand won 3–2 on aggregate.
