= 2016 AFF Championship Group B =

Group B was one of the two groups of the 2016 AFF Championship. It consisted of hosts Myanmar, Malaysia, Vietnam and qualification round winners Cambodia. Play in Group B began on 20 November and ended on 26 November.

== Teams ==
Draw position	Team	Appearance	Previous best performance	FIFA World Rankings (as of 20 October 2016)
B1	Myanmar (H)	11th	Fourth place (2004)	156
B2	Malaysia	11th	Winners (2010)	164
B3	Vietnam	11th	Winners (2008)	136
QFW	Cambodia	6th	Group stage (1996, 2000, 2002, 2004, 2008)	167

== Group standings ==
Pos	Team	Pld	W	D	L	GF	GA	GD	Pts	Qualification
1	Vietnam	3	3	0	0	5	2	+3	9	Advance to knockout stage
2	Myanmar (H)	3	2	0	1	5	3	+2	6	Advance to knockout stage
3	Malaysia	3	1	0	2	3	4	−1	3	
4	Cambodia	3	0	0	3	4	8	−4	0	

Source: AFF
(H) Hosts

In the semi-finals:

- Vietnam advanced to play against Indonesia (runners-up of Group A).
- Myanmar advanced to play against Thailand (winners of Group A).

== Matches ==
All times are in local, Myanmar Time (UTC+06:30).

=== Malaysia vs Cambodia ===
20 November 2016
15:00

Malaysia	3–2	Cambodia
Syazwan 37'; Amri 69', 80'	Report	Vathanaka 8', 60'

Thuwunna Stadium, Yangon
Attendance: 576
Referee: Yaqoob Abdul Baki (Oman)

Malaysia	Cambodia

GK	19	Khairul Fahmi
RB	15	Rizal Ghazali
CB	5	Shahrom Kalam
CB	3	Shahrul Saad
LB	2	Matthew Davies
RM	17	Amri Yahyah (c)
CM	7	Baddrol Bakhtiar
CM	20	Irfan Fazail	(substituted off) 85'
LM	16	Syazwan Zainon	(substituted off) 77'
CF	18	Darren Lok	(substituted off) 74'
CF	11	Hazwan Bakri
Substitutions:
FW	10	Safee Sali	(substituted on) 74'
MF	23	Hadin Azman	(substituted on) 77'
MF	12	S. Veenod	(substituted on) 85'
Manager:
Ong Kim Swee

GK	1	Sou Yaty (c)
CB	20	Sok Sovan
CB	13	Nub Tola
CB	5	Soeuy Visal	(yellow card) 30'
CM	17	Chhin Chhoeun
CM	16	Chrerng Polroth
CM	26	Rous Samoeun		(substituted off) 50'
RW	7	Prak Mony Udom		(substituted off) 84'
AM	12	Sos Suhana
LW	11	Chan Vathanaka
CF	10	Keo Sokpheng		(substituted off) 78'
Substitutions:
DF	6	Pidor Sam Oeun		(substituted on) 50'
MF	15	Tith Dina		(substituted on) 78'
FW	9	Khoun Laboravy		(substituted on) 84'
Manager:
(South Korea) Lee Tae-hoon

Man of the Match:
Amri Yahyah (Malaysia)

Assistant referees:
Bakhadyr Kochkarov (Kyrgyzstan)
Wellabada Sanjeewa (Sri Lanka)
Fourth official:
Kim Dong-jin (South Korea)

Overall
Statistics	Malaysia	Cambodia
Goals scored	3	2
Total shots	18	5
Shots on target	6	3
Ball possession	63%	37%
Corner kicks	4	3
Fouls committed	12	18
Offsides	2	3
Yellow cards	0	1
Red cards	0	0

=== Myanmar vs Vietnam ===
20 November 2016
18:00

Myanmar	1–2	Vietnam
Aung Thu 73'	Report	Nguyễn Văn Quyết 24'; Lê Công Vinh 80'

Thuwunna Stadium, Yangon
Attendance: 28,040
Referee: Hiroyuki Kimura (Japan)

Myanmar	Vietnam

GK	18	Kyaw Zin Phyo
RB	4	David Htan
CB	3	Zaw Min Tun
CB	15	Phyo Ko Ko Thein
LB	5	Nanda Kyaw
RM	8	Kaung Sett Naing		(substituted off) 36'
CM	6	Yan Aung Kyaw (c)
CM	7	Ye Ko Oo	(yellow card) 36'	(substituted off) 45'
LM	9	Aung Thu	(yellow card) 82'
CF	10	Win Naing Soe		(substituted off) 66'
CF	21	Maung Maung Lwin
Substitutions:
DF	12	Kyaw Zin Lwin	(yellow card) 75'	(substituted on) 36'
MF	11	Myo Ko Tun		(substituted on) 45'
FW	22	Than Paing		(substituted on) 66'
Manager:
(Germany) Gerd Zeise

GK	1	Trần Nguyên Mạnh
RB	17	Vũ Văn Thanh
CB	15	Quế Ngọc Hải
CB	3	Trương Đình Luật
LB	13	Trần Đình Đồng
CM	14	Lương Xuân Trường	(substituted off) 88'
CM	7	Ngô Hoàng Thịnh
RW	21	Nguyễn Văn Toàn	(substituted off) 50'
AM	18	Đinh Thanh Trung	(substituted off) 67'
LW	10	Nguyễn Văn Quyết
CF	9	Lê Công Vinh (c)
Substitutions:
MF	8	Nguyễn Trọng Hoàng	(substituted on) 50'
MF	11	Phạm Thành Lương	(substituted on) 67'
FW	12	Lê Văn Thắng	(substituted on) 88'
Manager:
Nguyễn Hữu Thắng

Man of the Match:
Lê Công Vinh (Vietnam)

Assistant referees:
Toshiyuki Nagi (Japan)
Palvan Palvanow (Turkmenistan)
Fourth official:
Çarymyrat Kurbanow (Turkmenistan)

Overall
Statistics	Myanmar	Vietnam
Goals scored	1	2
Total shots	13	9
Shots on target	4	4
Ball possession	36%	64%
Corner kicks	0	1
Fouls committed	19	7
Offsides	2	3
Yellow cards	3	0
Red cards	0	0

=== Malaysia vs Vietnam ===
23 November 2016
15:00

Malaysia	0–1	Vietnam
	Report	Nguyễn Trọng Hoàng 80'

Thuwunna Stadium, Yangon
Attendance: 2,542
Referee: Çarymyrat Kurbanow (Turkmenistan)

Malaysia	Vietnam

GK	19	Khairul Fahmi
CB	5	Shahrom Kalam
CB	3	Shahrul Saad	(yellow card) 37'
CB	24	Ronny Harun
RWB	15	Rizal Ghazali	(yellow card) 85'
LWB	2	Matthew Davies
CM	14	Fakri Saarani		(substituted off) 59'
CM	7	Baddrol Bakhtiar	(yellow card) 27'	(substituted off) 68'
CM	16	Syazwan Zainon		(substituted off) 82'
SS	17	Amri Yahyah (c)	(yellow card) 90+4'
CF	11	Hazwan Bakri
Substitutions:
FW	18	Darren Lok		(substituted on) 68'
MF	12	S. Veenod		(substituted on) 59'
FW	8	Zaquan Adha	(yellow card) 82'	(substituted on) 82'
Manager:
Ong Kim Swee

GK	1	Trần Nguyên Mạnh
RB	2	Âu Văn Hoàn
CB	15	Quế Ngọc Hải
CB	3	Trương Đình Luật
LB	17	Vũ Văn Thanh
RM	8	Nguyễn Trọng Hoàng
CM	14	Lương Xuân Trường		(substituted off) 90+4'
CM	7	Ngô Hoàng Thịnh	(yellow card) 20'
LM	10	Nguyễn Văn Quyết		(substituted off) 63'
AM	18	Đinh Thanh Trung		(substituted off) 53'
CF	9	Lê Công Vinh (c)
Substitutions:
MF	11	Phạm Thành Lương		(substituted on) 53'
FW	16	Nguyễn Công Phượng		(substituted on) 63'
MF	6	Vũ Minh Tuấn		(substituted on) 90+4'
Manager:
Nguyễn Hữu Thắng

Man of the Match:
Nguyễn Trọng Hoàng (Vietnam)

Assistant referees:
Palvan Palvanow (Turkmenistan)
Toshiyuki Nagi (Japan)
Fourth official:
Hiroyuki Kimura (Japan)

Overall
Statistics	Malaysia	Vietnam
Goals scored	0	1
Total shots	9	10
Shots on target	4	4
Ball possession	31%	69%
Corner kicks	3	4
Fouls committed	21	16
Offsides	2	4
Yellow cards	5	1
Red cards	0	0

=== Cambodia vs Myanmar ===
23 November 2016
18:00

Cambodia	1–3	Myanmar
Suhana 14'	Report	Zaw Min Tun 35', 40'; Aung Thu 57'

Thuwunna Stadium, Yangon
Attendance: 15,236
Referee: Kim Dong-jin (South Korea)

Cambodia	Myanmar

GK	1	Sou Yaty
RB	6	Pidor Sam Oeun
CB	20	Sok Sovan
CB	13	Nub Tola
LB	26	Rous Samoeun
CM	3	Nen Sothearoth		(substituted off) 55'
CM	16	Chrerng Polroth
CM	11	Chan Vathanaka (c)
AM	12	Sos Suhana	(yellow card) 59'	(substituted off) 74'
CF	7	Prak Mony Udom		(substituted off) 40'
CF	10	Keo Sokpheng
Substitutions:
MF	15	Tith Dina		(substituted on) 40'
DF	5	Soeuy Visal		(substituted on) 55'
MF	23	Thierry Chantha Bin		(substituted on) 74'
Manager:
(South Korea) Lee Tae-hoon

GK	18	Kyaw Zin Phyo
RB	12	Kyaw Zin Lwin
CB	3	Zaw Min Tun
CB	15	Phyo Ko Ko Thein
LB	5	Nanda Kyaw
RM	4	David Htan		(substituted off) 89'
CM	11	Myo Ko Tun		(substituted off) 67'
CM	6	Yan Aung Kyaw (c)
LM	21	Maung Maung Lwin
SS	8	Kaung Sett Naing		(substituted off) 74'
CF	9	Aung Thu
Substitutions:
MF	16	Hlaing Bo Bo	(yellow card) 81'	(substituted on) 67'
DF	19	Set Phyo Wai		(substituted on) 74'
MF	25	Zin Phyo Aung		(substituted on) 89'
Manager:
(Germany) Gerd Zeise

Man of the Match:
Zaw Min Tun (Myanmar)

Assistant referees:
Abu Bakar Al-Amri (Oman)
Wellabada Sanjeewa (Sri Lanka)
Fourth official:
Yaqoob Abdul Baki (Oman)

Overall
Statistics	Cambodia	Myanmar
Goals scored	1	3
Total shots	10	25
Shots on target	7	9
Ball possession	48%	52%
Corner kicks	4	6
Fouls committed	7	10
Offsides	1	0
Yellow cards	1	1
Red cards	0	0

=== Vietnam vs Cambodia ===
26 November 2016
18:00

Vietnam	2–1	Cambodia
Lê Công Vinh 20'; Tola 50' (o.g.)	Report	Polroth 65'

Wunna Theikdi Stadium, Naypyidaw
Attendance: 685
Referee: Hiroyuki Kimura (Japan)

Vietnam	Cambodia

GK	1	Trần Nguyên Mạnh
RB	2	Âu Văn Hoàn
CB	15	Quế Ngọc Hải
CB	3	Trương Đình Luật	(red card) 7'
LB	17	Vũ Văn Thanh
RM	21	Nguyễn Văn Toàn		(substituted off) 61'
CM	8	Nguyễn Trọng Hoàng		(substituted off) 85'
CM	11	Phạm Thành Lương
CM	12	Lê Văn Thắng
LM	16	Nguyễn Công Phượng		(substituted off) 17'
CF	9	Lê Công Vinh (c)	(yellow card) 90+3'
Substitutions:
DF	25	Bùi Tiến Dũng		(substituted on) 17'
FW	20	Trần Phi Sơn		(substituted on) 61'
MF	18	Đinh Thanh Trung		(substituted on) 85'
Manager:
Nguyễn Hữu Thắng

GK	22	Um Sereyroth
RB	20	Sok Sovan
CB	13	Nub Tola	(yellow card) 90+2'
CB	23	Thierry Chantha Bin		(substituted off) 45+2'
LB	5	Soeuy Visal
RM	17	Chhin Chhoeun	(yellow card) 85'
CM	16	Chrerng Polroth
LM	26	Rous Samoeun	(yellow card) 18'
AM	12	Sos Suhana
AM	11	Chan Vathanaka (c)		(substituted off) 79'
CF	10	Keo Sokpheng		(substituted off) 64'
Substitutions:
FW	7	Prak Mony Udom		(substituted on) 45+2'
MF	15	Tith Dina		(substituted on) 64'
FW	9	Khoun Laboravy		(substituted on) 79'
Manager:
(South Korea) Lee Tae-hoon

Man of the Match:
Lê Công Vinh (Vietnam)

Assistant referees:
Toshiyuki Nagi (Japan)
Palvan Palvanow (Turkmenistan)
Fourth official:
Çarymyrat Kurbanow (Turkmenistan)

Overall
Statistics	Vietnam	Cambodia
Goals scored	2	1
Total shots	7	10
Shots on target	2	2
Ball possession	60%	40%
Corner kicks	1	3
Fouls committed	6	14
Offsides	2	1
Yellow cards	1	3
Red cards	1	0

=== Myanmar vs Malaysia ===
26 November 2016
18:00

Myanmar	1–0	Malaysia
David Htan 89'	Report

Thuwunna Stadium, Yangon
Attendance: 32,758
Referee: Yaqoob Abdul Baki (Oman)

Myanmar	Malaysia

GK	18	Kyaw Zin Phyo
RB	12	Kyaw Zin Lwin
CB	3	Zaw Min Tun
CB	15	Phyo Ko Ko Thein
LB	5	Nanda Kyaw
RM	4	David Htan	(yellow card) 79'
CM	6	Yan Aung Kyaw (c)
CM	11	Myo Ko Tun		(substituted off) 68'
LM	21	Maung Maung Lwin		(substituted off) 73'
CF	8	Kaung Sett Naing		(substituted off) 84'
CF	9	Aung Thu
Substitutions:
MF	7	Ye Ko Oo		(substituted on) 68'
MF	14	Yan Naing Oo		(substituted on) 73'
FW	22	Than Paing		(substituted on) 84'
Manager:
(Germany) Gerd Zeise

GK	19	Khairul Fahmi
RB	15	Rizal Ghazali
CB	5	Shahrom Kalam	(yellow card) 45'	(substituted off) 76'
CB	24	Ronny Harun
LB	21	Nazirul Naim
CM	14	Fakri Saarani		(substituted off) 67'
CM	7	Baddrol Bakhtiar	(yellow card) 20'
CM	16	Syazwan Zainon
AM	17	Amri Yahyah (c)
CF	9	Norshahrul Idlan		(substituted off) 74'
CF	11	Hazwan Bakri
Substitutions:
DF	3	Shahrul Saad		(substituted on) 67'
FW	18	Darren Lok		(substituted on) 74'
FW	10	Safee Sali		(substituted on) 76'
Manager:
Ong Kim Swee

Man of the Match:
David Htan (Myanmar)

Assistant referees:
Abu Bakar Al-Amri (Oman)
Bakhadyr Kochkarov (Kyrgyzstan)
Fourth official:
Kim Dong-jin (South Korea)

Overall
Statistics	Myanmar	Malaysia
Goals scored	1	0
Total shots	17	10
Shots on target	8	1
Ball possession	52%	48%
Corner kicks	8	5
Fouls committed	14	13
Offsides	3	3
Yellow cards	1	2
Red cards	0	0
