= Nguyễn Xuân Luân =

Vietnamese footballer

Personal information
- Full name: Nguyễn Xuân Luân
- Date of birth: 11 September 1987 (age 39)
- Place of birth: Quỳ Hợp, Nghệ An, Vietnam
- Height: 1.74 m (5 ft 9 in)
- Position: Defender

Youth career
- 2004–2010: Sông Lam Nghệ An

Senior career*
Years	Team	Apps	(Gls)
2011	Hòa Phát Hà Nội	23	(0)
2012	Hà Nội T&T	21	(0)
2013	Vissai Ninh Bình	18	(0)
2014	Thanh Hóa	21	(0)
2015–2018	Becamex Bình Dương	66	(0)
2019–2021	Bà Rịa Vũng Tàu	36	(0)
- * Club domestic league appearances and goals as of 22 July 2018

Nguyễn Xuân Luân (born 11 September 1987) is a Vietnamese footballer who plays for Bà Rịa Vũng Tàu as a defender.
