= Gerd Zeise =

German football coach (born 1952)

Personal information
- Full name: Gerd Friedrich Horst Zeise
- Date of birth: 6 September 1952 (age 74)

Team information
- Current team: Yangon United (Head coach)

Managerial career
- Years: Team
- 1981–1983; 1986–1987: Berliner Fußball-Verband
- 1992–1994: Rot-Weiss Essen
- 1994–1997: FC 08 Homburg
- 1997–1998: Rot-Weiß Oberhausen
- 1998–1999: Wuppertaler SV
- 1999–2000: KRC Harelbeke
- 2006–2007: SHB Đà Nẵng
- 2007–2009: New Radiant SC
- 2011–2015: Myanmar U-19
- 2015–2018: Myanmar
- 2023–2023: Yangon United

Gerd Friedrich Horst Zeise (born 6 September 1952) is a German football manager, currently managing young talented players to improve in their teams.

His last engagement was as the head coach of Yangon United in Myanmar National League 2023/24.

Since the beginning of his engagement in Myanmar's football landscape in 2011, he was responsible for coaching the U-19, U-20, U-21 and U-23 teams and led them through various tournaments. In 2015, Zeise was appointed head coach of the Myanmar national team after the departure of Radojko Avramović.

One of the most remarkable achievements during his time in Myanmar is the 2011 BIDC Cup, held in Cambodia with Myanmar's U-21 team. In the same tournament, in 2013, the Burmese team finished as runners-up. among a field of U-23 teams. Furthermore, Zeise won the 2014 Hassanal Bolkiah Trophy tournament in Brunei with Myanmar's participating U-19 team among all U-21 teams of South East Asia.

In 2015, Zeise made history after leading the Myanmar under-20 team to the 2015 FIFA U-20 World Cup. The following year, he coached Myanmar during the 2016 AFF Championship which the country co-hosted. After 12 long years, the Chinthe reached the semi-finals for the first time, where they were beaten by their fellow co-hosts Thailand. Zeise left by mutual consent in March 2018, after the team was beaten by Kyrgyzstan and failed to qualify for the 2019 AFC Asian Cup.

Zeise started his career in several clubs in Germany, such as Rot-Weiss Essen, FC 08 Homburg, Rot-Weiß Oberhausen and Wuppertaler SV. After that he coached the first division KRC Harelbeke and also managed SHB Đà Nẵng in Vietnam and New Radiant SC in the Maldives.
