= Abduh Lestaluhu =

Indonesian footballer

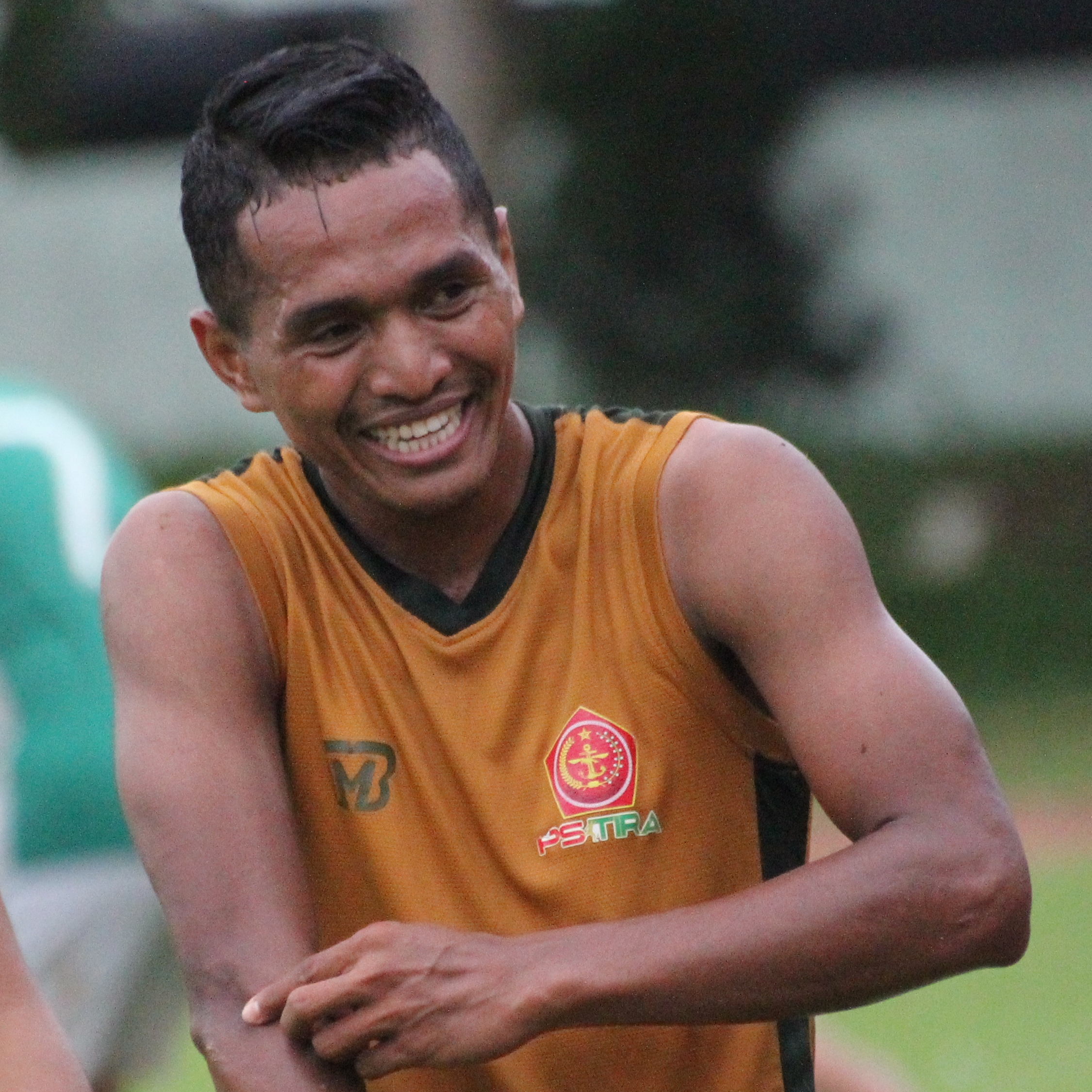
- Lestaluhu with TIRA-Persikabo in 2019

Personal information
- Full name: Muhammad Abduh Lestaluhu
- Date of birth: 16 October 1993 (age 33)
- Place of birth: Tulehu, Indonesia
- Height: 1.68 m (5 ft 6 in)
- Position: Left-back

Team information
- Current team: PSIS Semarang
- Number: 18

Youth career
- Tunas Gamalama
- Pra-PON Pelajar Maluku Utara
- 2010–2011: Deportivo Indonesia

Senior career*
Years	Team	Apps	(Gls)
2011–2012	Persis Solo	14	(1)
2013–2015	Persija Jakarta	7	(0)
2016–2021	Persikabo 1973	97	(1)
2021–2023	Persis Solo	41	(1)
2022	→ Bali United (loan)	5	(0)
2023–2025	PSS Sleman	48	(0)
2025–2026	Malut United	15	(0)
2026–	PSIS Semarang	7	(0)

International career
2007–2008	Indonesia U16	5	(0)
2011	Indonesia U19	4	(0)
2015	Indonesia U23	12	(1)
2016–2019	Indonesia	13	(0)
Medal record
Men's football
Representing Indonesia
AFF Championship
Runner-up	2016 Myanmar & Philippines	Team
- * Club domestic league appearances and goals as of 21 November 2026

Muhammad Abduh Lestaluhu (born 16 October 1993) is an Indonesian professional footballer who plays as a left-back for Championship club PSIS Semarang. He lives in Ternate and his childhood friend is Persib Bandung player, Ardi Idrus. His uncle, Ramdani Lestaluhu is also a football player. He is also a First Sergeant in the Indonesian Army for Military Police Corps unit.

== Club career ==
=== Persis Solo ===
Born in Tulehu, Abduh made his first career in 2011, then Abduh decided to joined Persis Solo was then coached by Junaedi, he said "Exactly to be my first pro team in Indonesia". Together with Persis Solo, he has played 14 times with a score of 1 goal.

=== Persija Jakarta ===
In 2012, Abduh officially signed a contract with Persija Jakarta, not only himself, other players followed to join, such as Feri Komul, Gustavo López, Daryono, Barkah Crustian, and Anindito Wahyu. Abduh made his Persija debut in a 1–1 draw against Persisam Samarinda on 6 January 2013 as a substitute for Defri Rizki in the 87th minute. During his career at Persija, He made only 7 league appearances for Persija Jakarta.

=== PS TNI / Persikabo 1973 ===
In 2015, The sanctions that hit Indonesian football made Abduh's career at Persija hampered because the competition was officially stopped, he then started his career as a member of the Indonesian National Armed Forces (TNI). After undergoing a series of tests, feasibility tests, and training materials which he had been doing for 5 months, Abduh was finally accepted as a member of the TNI with the rank of second sergeant (serda) at the end of 2015.

At that time, TNI built a football club. Abduh's background made it quite easy for him to penetrate the team. He eventually joined the club in the 2016 Jenderal Sudirman Cup and 2016 Indonesia Soccer Championship A.

Abduh made his first official league debut on 22 April 2017, coming on as a starter in a 2–2 draw with Persib Bandung at the Pakansari Stadium, Bogor. Abduh scored his first career Indonesian Liga 1 goal in a 1–2 loss over Bali United on 15 August 2019.

=== Return to Persis Solo ===
On 18 June 2021, Persis Solo announces 38th new recruit. Abduh officially signed a contract with the team and became part of the squad to play in 2021–22 season, this is an opportunity for him to return to his old club. Abduh made his first league debut on 26 September 2021, coming on as a starter in a 2–0 win with PSG Pati at the Manahan Stadium, Surakarta. On 26 October, Abduh scored his first goal for Persis against PSCS Cilacap in the 66th minute at the Manahan Stadium.

==== Bali United (loan) ====
In January 2022, Abduh signed a contract with Liga 1 club Bali United on loan from Persis Solo. He made his league debut in a 2–0 win against Persita Tangerang on 17 January 2022 as a substitute for Leonard Tupamahu in the 70th minute at the Ngurah Rai Stadium, Denpasar.

=== PSS Sleman ===
Abduh was signed for PSS Sleman to play in Liga 1 in the 2023–24 season. He made his debut on 1 July 2023 in a match against Bali United at the Kapten I Wayan Dipta Stadium, Gianyar.

== International career ==
He received a red card in the 2nd leg of 2016 AFF Championship Final at the 90th minute near the end of the match because of kicking the ball to Thai bench as a sign of protest for what he perceive for their uncooperative when one of the Thai officials in the bench denying to give him the ball in the way seen by him as "an act of delaying the time". Shortly after he being sent off, he was seen showing his middle finger to Thai fans.

== Career statistics ==
=== Club ===
As of match played 21 November 2026

Club	Season	League			Cup (Note: Includes Piala Indonesia)		Continental		Other (Note: Appearances in Indonesia President's Cup)		Total	
Club	Season	Division	Apps	Goals	Apps	Goals	Apps	Goals	Apps	Goals	Apps	Goals
Persija Jakarta	2013	Indonesia Super League	5	0	0	0	–		0	0	5	0
Persija Jakarta	2014	Indonesia Super League	2	0	0	0	–		0	0	2	0
Persija Jakarta	2015	Indonesia Super League	0	0	0	0	–		0	0	0	0
Persija Jakarta	Total		7	0	0	0	–		0	0	7	0
TIRA-Persikabo	2016	ISC A	14	0	0	0	–		0	0	14	0
TIRA-Persikabo	2017	Liga 1	26	0	0	0	–		3	0	29	0
TIRA-Persikabo	2018	Liga 1	26	0	0	0	–		3	0	29	0
TIRA-Persikabo	2019	Liga 1	28	1	1	0	–		3	0	32	1
TIRA-Persikabo	2020	Liga 1	3	0	0	0	–		0	0	3	0
TIRA-Persikabo	2021	Liga 1	0	0	0	0	–		3 (Note: Appearances in Menpora Cup)	0	3	0
TIRA-Persikabo	Total		97	1	1	0	–		12	0	110	1
Persis Solo	2021	Liga 2	15	1	0	0	–		0	0	15	1
Persis Solo	2022–23	Liga 1	26	0	0	0	–		2	0	28	0
Persis Solo	Total		41	1	0	0	–		2	0	43	1
Bali United (loan)	2021–22	Liga 1	5	0	0	0	–		0	0	5	0
PSS Sleman	2023–24	Liga 1	26	0	0	0	–		0	0	26	0
PSS Sleman	2024–25	Liga 1	22	0	0	0	–		0	0	22	0
PSS Sleman	Total		48	0	0	0	–		0	0	48	0
Malut United	2025–26	Super League	15	0	0	0	–		0	0	15	0
PSIS Semarang	2026–27	Championship	7	0	0	0	–		0	0	7	0
Career total			220	2	1	0	0	0	14	0	235	2

==== International appearances ====
As of match played 15 October 2019

Appearances and goals by national team and year
National team	Year	Apps	Goals
Indonesia	2016	11	0
Indonesia	2017	0	0
Indonesia	2018	1	0
Indonesia	2019	1	0
Total		13	0

=== International goals ===
Scores and results list the Indonesia's goal tally first.

Indonesia U-23

#	Date	Venue	Opponent	Score	Result	Competition
1.	2 June 2015	Jalan Besar Stadium, Kallang, Singapore	Myanmar	1–2	2–4	2015 SEA Games

== Personal life ==
Lestaluhu is the twin brother of Rafid Lestaluhu, he also has an older brother Ramdani Lestaluhu, and a younger brother Pandi Lestaluhu, who are also professional footballers and former teammates of his at Persija Jakarta.

== Honours ==
=== Club ===
Persis Solo

- Liga 2: 2021

Bali United

- Liga 1: 2021–22

=== International ===
Indonesia

- AFF Championship runner-up: 2016

=== Individual ===
- Liga 2 Best XI: 2021
