= Chrerng Polroth =

Cambodian footballer

Chrerng Polroth ច្រឹង ពលរដ្ឋ
Personal information
- Full name: Chrerng Polroth
- Date of birth: 4 July 1997 (age 29)
- Place of birth: Phnom Penh, Cambodia
- Height: 1.75 m (5 ft 9 in)
- Position: Midfielder

Youth career
- 2008–2010: National Defense Ministry
- 2010–2013: Svay Rieng

Senior career*
Years	Team	Apps	(Gls)
2010–2013	Svay Rieng		
2013–2015	TriAsia Phnom Penh		
2015–2019	National Defense Ministry		
2019	→ Buriram United (loan)	0	(0)
2020–2024	Visakha	51	(4)
2023–2024	Visakha B		
2024	Phnom Penh Crown	0	(0)

International career
2011	Cambodia U-16		
2015	Cambodia U-19	5	(4)
2017	Cambodia U-23	10	(1)
2015–2021	Cambodia	27	(2)
- * Club domestic league appearances and goals

Chrerng Polroth (born 4 July 1997) is a Cambodian footballer who recently played as a midfielder for Phnom Penh Crown and the Cambodia national team. He is known for his iconic hairstyle and scoring an impressive long-range goal against Vietnam at the 2016 AFF Championship.

== International goals ==
Scores and results list Cambodia's goal tally first.

#	Date	Venue	Opponent	Score	Result	Competition
1.	1 September 2016	Mong Kok Stadium, Hong Kong	Hong Kong	1–1	2–4	Friendly Match
2.	26 November 2016	Wunna Theikdi Stadium, Naypyidaw, Myanmar	Vietnam	1–2	1–2	2016 AFF Championship

== Honours ==
=== Club ===
Svay Rieng

- Cambodian League: 2012
- Hun Sen Cup: 2011, 2012

National Defense Ministry

- Hun Sen Cup: 2016

Visakha

- Hun Sen Cup: 2020, 2021, 2022
