= Rous Samoeun =

Cambodian footballer

Personal information
- Full name: Rous Samoeun
- Date of birth: December 20, 1994 (age 31)
- Place of birth: Cambodia
- Height: 1.71 m (5 ft 7 1/2 in)
- Positions: Left back; right back

Senior career*
Years	Team	Apps	(Gls)
2011–2013	Chhlam Samuth	23	(1)
2013–2018	Boeung Ket Angkor	173	(21)
2018–2023	Visakha	11	(2)
2023	→ Prey Veng (Loan)	0	(0)
2023	Visakha B	3	(0)

International career^{‡}
2013–2015	Cambodia U-23	12	(1)
2013–2018	Cambodia	35	(1)
- * Club domestic league appearances and goals ‡ National team caps and goals as of 22 March 2018

Rous Samoeun (born 20 December 1994) is a Cambodian footballer who plays as a defender. He used to be part of the Cambodia national football team since 2013.

== International career ==
Samoeun scored his first international goal in a friendly match against Bhutan, outsmarting goalie Hari Gurung to slot the ball in the net in the 28th minute.

== International goals ==
#	Date	Venue	Opponent	Score	Result	Competition
1.	August 20, 2015	Phnom Penh National Olympic Stadium, Phnom Penh	Bhutan	1–0	2–0	Exhibition game

== Style of play ==
Sameoun is a modern full-back. His style of play is built around speed and he is capable of playing on both the left and right flanks. Though predominantly a left-back he has also played as an attacking winger. His attacking style of play and willingness to play high up the field has led to some defensive performances that were not rated highly. Playing up the field as a full back has led to some instances of not being able to track back to defend in time after going on the attack.

== Honours ==
=== Club ===
Boeung Ket Angkor

- Cambodian League: 2017
- Cambodian League: 2016
- 2015 Mekong Club Championship: Runner up
