= 2016 AFF Championship =

၂၀၁၆ အာဆီယံချန်ပီယံရှစ် ဘောလုံးပြိုင်ပွဲ

Tournament details
- Host country: Myanmar; Philippines (for group stage)
- Dates: 19 November – 17 December
- Teams: 8 (from 1 sub-confederation)
- Venues: 4 (in 4 host cities)

Final positions
- Champions: Thailand (5th title)
- Runners-up: Indonesia

Tournament statistics
- Matches played: 18
- Goals scored: 50 (2.78 per match)
- Attendance: 316,168 (17,565 per match)
- Top scorer(s): (Thailand) Teerasil Dangda (6 goals)
- Best player: (Thailand) Chanathip Songkrasin
- Best goalkeeper: (Indonesia) Kurnia Meiga
- Fair play award: Thailand

The 2016 AFF Championship, sponsored by Suzuki and officially known as the AFF Suzuki Cup 2016, was the 11th edition of the AFF Championship, the football championship of nations affiliated to the ASEAN Football Federation (AFF). The whole tournament ran from 19 November to 17 December 2016. After the recognition by FIFA as a "category A" tournament, the 2016 edition of the tournament would grant international ranking points for each match.

The group stage of the tournament was held for the first time in Myanmar and the Philippines, from 19 to 26 November 2016.

Thailand were the defending champions, and they successfully defended their title by a 3–2 victory in the two-legged final against Indonesia to secure their record-breaking fifth title.

== Hosts ==
At the 11th ASEAN Football Federation Council meeting in Naypyidaw on 21 December 2013, Myanmar and the Philippines were named as co-hosts the group stage of the tournament. This marked the first time that both countries hosted the group stages of the competition.

The Philippine Football Federation (PFF) initially withdrew as co-host of the group stages in February 2016, citing issues with the Rizal Memorial Stadium as well as the availability of another venue. The replacing host were said to be announced on 12 March 2016, with Malaysia and 2014 co-hosts Singapore and Vietnam announcing they have or were to apply. The Philippines also later announced that they would appeal to keep their hosting rights.

On 7 March, the AFF accepted the appeal of the Philippines while Malaysia were named 'standby host', with Vietnam and Singapore withdrawing their bids. The Philippines were given until 11 March in order to secure a contract to use the Philippine Sports Stadium (PSS) as a venue. Rizal Memorial Stadium is to be used as a secondary venue during the final simultaneous group matches. On 12 March, it was confirmed that the Philippines retained hosting rights, following an AFF Council Meeting in Da Nang, Vietnam. The PFF was able to present a contract with the PSS to the AFF as well as a letter of guarantee from the Philippine Sports Commission.

== Venues ==
(Thailand) Bangkok	(Indonesia) Bogor	(Vietnam) Hanoi	(Myanmar) Yangon
Rajamangala Stadium	Pakansari Stadium	Mỹ Đình National Stadium	Thuwunna Stadium
Capacity: 49,722	Capacity: 30,000	Capacity: 40,192	Capacity: 32,000
Location of stadiums of the 2016 AFF Championship. Blue: Final. Green: Semi-final. Yellow: Group Stage.
(Myanmar) Naypyidaw		(Philippines) Bocaue	(Philippines) Manila
Wunna Theikdi Stadium		Philippine Sports Stadium	Rizal Memorial Stadium
Capacity: 30,000		Capacity: 20,000	Capacity: 12,873

== Qualification ==
Qualified for AFF Championship Failed to qualify Did not enter Not an AFF member

Also during the AFF Council Meeting in Naypyidaw (Myanmar), Cambodia were named as hosts for the qualification tournament. Myanmar and the Philippines automatically qualify to the final round as hosts.

The Football Association of Indonesia was suspended by FIFA and they wouldn't have been able to participate in the tournament if suspension imposed on them won't be lifted by in time for the tournament. The AFF had given Indonesia a deadline of before 5 August 2016 to have the suspension lifted. The suspension was lifted at the 66th FIFA Congress.

=== Qualified teams ===
The following eight teams qualified for the competition.

Team	Appearance	Previous best performance
Myanmar	11th	Fourth place (2004)
Philippines	10th	Semi-finalists (2010, 2012, 2014)
Thailand	11th	Winners (1996, 2000, 2002, 2014)
Malaysia	11th	Winners (2010)
Vietnam	11th	Winners (2008)
Indonesia	11th	Runners-up (2000, 2002, 2004, 2010)
Singapore	11th	Winners (1998, 2004, 2007, 2012)
Cambodia	6th	Group stage (1996, 2000, 2002, 2004, 2008)

== Draw ==
The draw for the 2016 AFF Championships was made on 2 August 2016, with Indonesia placed in the bottom pot after the FIFA's suspension. The identity of the eighth qualified team (Cambodia) was yet to be determined at the time of the draw.

Pot 1	Pot 2	Pot 3	Pot 4
Myanmar (co-hosts); Philippines (co-hosts)	Thailand (holders); Malaysia	Singapore; Vietnam	Indonesia (unranked); Cambodia (Qualification Winner)

== Match officials ==
The following referees were chosen for the competition.

- (Australia) Jarred Gillett
- (China) Fu Ming
- (India) Rowan Arumughan
- (Japan) Hiroyuki Kimura
- (Japan) Jumpei Iida
- (Jordan) Adham Makhadmeh
- (Oman) Yaqoob Abdul Baki
- (South Korea) Kim Dong-jin
- (Syria) Masoud Tufaylieh
- (Turkmenistan) Çarymyrat Kurbanow
- (Chinese Taipei) Yu Ming-hsun
- (United Arab Emirates) Mohammed Abdulla Hassan Mohamed
- (Uzbekistan) Valentin Kovalenko
- (Uzbekistan) Ilgiz Tantashev

== Group stage ==
Result of teams participating in 2016 AFF Championship: Winner Runner-up / Semi-finals Group stage

Tiebreakers

Ranking in each group was determined as follows:

1. Greater number of points obtained in all the group matches;
2. Goal difference in all the group matches;
3. Greater number of goals scored in all the group matches.

If two or more teams were equal on the basis on the above three criteria, the placement was determined as follows:

1. Result of the direct match between the teams concerned;
2. Penalty shoot-out if only two teams were tied and they met in the last round of the group;
3. Drawing of lots by the Organising Committee.

=== Group A ===
- All matches were played in the Philippines.
- Times listed are local (UTC+8:00)

Pos	Team	Pld	W	D	L	GF	GA	GD	Pts	Qualification
1	Thailand	3	3	0	0	6	2	+4	9	Advance to knockout stage
2	Indonesia	3	1	1	1	6	7	−1	4	Advance to knockout stage
3	Philippines (H)	3	0	2	1	2	3	−1	2	
4	Singapore	3	0	1	2	1	3	−2	1	

Source: AFF
Rules for classification: Group stage tiebreakers
(H) Hosts
19 November 2016
16:30

Thailand	4–2	Indonesia
Peerapat 4'; Teerasil 36', 79', 90+4'	Report	Boaz 53'; Lerby 56'

Philippine Sports Stadium, Bocaue
Attendance: 1,153
Referee: Valentin Kovalenko (Uzbekistan)
19 November 2016
20:00

Philippines	0–0	Singapore
	Report

Philippine Sports Stadium, Bocaue
Attendance: 4,339
Referee: Masoud Tufaylieh (Syria)

22 November 2016
16:30

Thailand	1–0	Singapore
Sarawut 89'	Report

Philippine Sports Stadium, Bocaue
Attendance: 359
Referee: Rowan Arumughan (India)
22 November 2016
20:00

Indonesia	2–2	Philippines
Fachrudin 7'; Boaz 68'	Report	Bahadoran 31'; P. Younghusband 82'

Philippine Sports Stadium, Bocaue
Attendance: 2,068
Referee: Yu Ming-hsun (Chinese Taipei)

25 November 2016
20:00

Singapore	1–2	Indonesia
Khairul 27'	Report	Andik 62'; Lilipaly 85'

Rizal Memorial Stadium, Manila
Attendance: 467
Referee: Masoud Tufaylieh (Syria)
25 November 2016
20:00

Philippines	0–1	Thailand
	Report	Sarawut 81'

Philippine Sports Stadium, Bocaue
Attendance: 3,185
Referee: Valentin Kovalenko (Uzbekistan)

=== Group B ===
- All matches were played in Myanmar.
- Times listed are local (UTC+6:30)

Pos	Team	Pld	W	D	L	GF	GA	GD	Pts	Qualification
1	Vietnam	3	3	0	0	5	2	+3	9	Advance to knockout stage
2	Myanmar (H)	3	2	0	1	5	3	+2	6	Advance to knockout stage
3	Malaysia	3	1	0	2	3	4	−1	3	
4	Cambodia	3	0	0	3	4	8	−4	0	

Source: AFF
Rules for classification: Group stage tiebreakers
(H) Hosts
20 November 2016
15:00

Malaysia	3–2	Cambodia
Syazwan 37'; Amri 69', 80'	Report	Vathanaka 8', 60'

Thuwunna Stadium, Yangon
Attendance: 576
Referee: Yaqoob Abdul Baki (Oman)
20 November 2016
18:00

Myanmar	1–2	Vietnam
Aung Thu 73'	Report	Nguyễn Văn Quyết 24'; Lê Công Vinh 80'

Thuwunna Stadium, Yangon
Attendance: 28,040
Referee: Hiroyuki Kimura (Japan)

23 November 2016
15:00

Malaysia	0–1	Vietnam
	Report	Nguyễn Trọng Hoàng 80'

Thuwunna Stadium, Yangon
Attendance: 2,542
Referee: Charymurat Kurbanov (Turkmenistan)
23 November 2016
18:00

Cambodia	1–3	Myanmar
Suhana 14'	Report	Zaw Min Tun 35', 40'; Aung Thu 57'

Thuwunna Stadium, Yangon
Attendance: 15,236
Referee: Kim Dong-jin (South Korea)

26 November 2016
18:00

Vietnam	2–1	Cambodia
Lê Công Vinh 20'; Tola 50' (o.g.)	Report	Polroth 65'

Wunna Theikdi Stadium, Naypyidaw
Attendance: 685
Referee: Hiroyuki Kimura (Japan)
26 November 2016
18:00

Myanmar	1–0	Malaysia
David Htan 89'	Report

Thuwunna Stadium, Yangon
Attendance: 32,758
Referee: Yaqoob Abdul Baki (Oman)

== Knockout stage ==
=== Bracket ===
Semi-finals
A2	Indonesia (a.e.t.)	2	2	4
B1	Vietnam	1	2	3
B2	Myanmar	0	0	0
A1	Thailand	2	4	6

Final
A2	Indonesia	2	0	2
A1	Thailand	1	2	3

Scores after extra time are indicated by (a.e.t.), and penalty shoot-out are indicated by (pen.).

=== Semi-finals ===
First legs

3 December 2016
19:00 UTC+7:00

Indonesia	2–1	Vietnam
Hansamu 7'; Boaz 50' (pen.)	Report	Nguyễn Văn Quyết 17' (pen.)

Pakansari Stadium, Bogor
Attendance: 30,000
Referee: Jarred Gillett (Australia)
4 December 2016
18:00 UTC+6:30

Myanmar	0–2	Thailand
	Report	Teerasil 24', 55'

Thuwunna Stadium, Yangon
Attendance: 33,122
Referee: Ilgiz Tantashev (Uzbekistan)

Second legs

7 December 2016
19:00 UTC+7:00

Vietnam	2–2 (a.e.t.)	Indonesia
Vũ Văn Thanh 83'; Vũ Minh Tuấn 90+3'	Report	Lilipaly 54'; Manahati 97' (pen.)

Mỹ Đình National Stadium, Hanoi
Attendance: 40,000
Referee: Fu Ming (China)

Indonesia won 4–3 on aggregate.

8 December 2016
19:00 UTC+7:00

Thailand	4–0	Myanmar
Sarawut 33'; Theerathon 66' (pen.); Siroch 76'; Chanathip 83'	Report

Rajamangala Stadium, Bangkok
Attendance: 43,638
Referee: Adham Makhadmeh (Jordan)

Thailand won 6–0 on aggregate.

=== Final ===
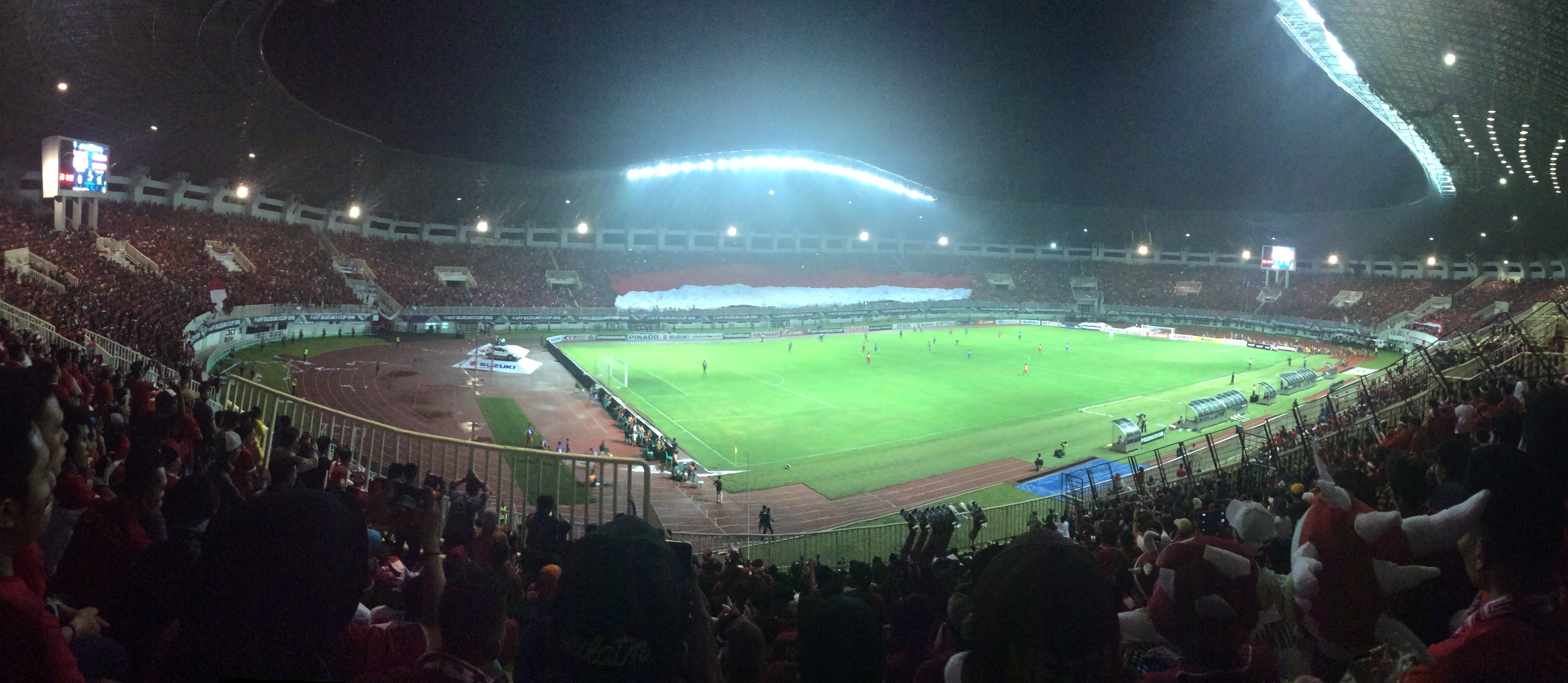
Panorama shot inside the Pakansari Stadium during the first leg between Indonesia vs Thailand in the final 2016 AFF Suzuki Cup.

First leg

14 December 2016
19:00 UTC+7:00

Indonesia	2–1	Thailand
Rizky 65'; Hansamu 70'	Report	Teerasil 33'

Pakansari Stadium, Bogor
Attendance: 30,000
Referee: Jumpei Iida (Japan)

Second leg

17 December 2016
19:00 UTC+7:00

Thailand	2–0	Indonesia
Siroch 38', 47'	Report

Rajamangala Stadium, Bangkok
Attendance: 48,000
Referee: Mohammed Abdulla Hassan Mohamed (United Arab Emirates)

Thailand won 3–2 on aggregate.

== Best XI ==
The best XI was a squad consisting of the eleven most impressive players at the tournament.

Pos.	Player
GK	(Indonesia) Kurnia Meiga
DF	(Thailand) Tristan Do
DF	(Singapore) Hariss Harun
DF	(Malaysia) Ronny Harun
MF	(Thailand) Sarach Yooyen
MF	(Vietnam) Nguyễn Trọng Hoàng
MF	(Indonesia) Rizky Pora
MF	(Thailand) Chanathip Songkrasin
FW	(Indonesia) Stefano Lilipaly
FW	(Thailand) Teerasil Dangda
FW	(Indonesia) Boaz Solossa

== Statistics ==
=== Winner ===
2016 AFF Championship champion

Thailand
Fifth title

=== Awards ===
Most Valuable Player	Top Scorer Award	Best Goalkeeper Award	Fair Play Award
(Thailand) Chanathip Songkrasin	(Thailand) Teerasil Dangda	(Indonesia) Kurnia Meiga	Thailand

=== Goalscorers ===
There were 50 goals scored in 18 matches, for an average of 2.78 goals per match.

6 goals

- (Thailand) Teerasil Dangda

3 goals

- (Indonesia) Boaz Solossa
- (Thailand) Sarawut Masuk
- (Thailand) Siroch Chatthong

2 goals

- (Cambodia) Chan Vathanaka
- (Indonesia) Hansamu Yama
- (Indonesia) Stefano Lilipaly
- (Malaysia) Mohd Amri Yahyah
- (Myanmar) Aung Thu
- (Myanmar) Zaw Min Tun
- (Vietnam) Lê Công Vinh
- (Vietnam) Nguyễn Văn Quyết

1 goal

- (Cambodia) Chrerng Polroth
- (Cambodia) Sos Suhana
- (Indonesia) Andik Vermansyah
- (Indonesia) Fachrudin Aryanto
- (Indonesia) Lerby Eliandry
- (Indonesia) Manahati Lestusen
- (Indonesia) Rizky Pora
- (Malaysia) Syazwan Zainon
- (Myanmar) David Htan
- (Philippines) Misagh Bahadoran
- (Philippines) Phil Younghusband
- (Singapore) Khairul Amri
- (Thailand) Chanathip Songkrasin
- (Thailand) Peerapat Notchaiya
- (Thailand) Theerathon Bunmathan
- (Vietnam) Nguyễn Trọng Hoàng
- (Vietnam) Vũ Minh Tuấn
- (Vietnam) Vũ Văn Thanh

1 own goal

- (Cambodia) Nub Tola (playing against Vietnam)

=== Discipline ===
In the final tournament, a player is suspended for the subsequent match in the competition for either getting a red card, or accumulating two yellow cards in two different matches.

Player	Offences	Suspensions
(Singapore) Hafiz Abu Sujad	(red card) in Group A v Philippines	Group A v Thailand
(Indonesia) Fachrudin Aryanto	(yellow card) in Group A v Philippines; (yellow card) in Group A v Singapore	Semi-finals 1st-leg v Vietnam
(Indonesia) Yanto Basna	(yellow card) in Group A v Philippines; (yellow card) in Group A v Singapore	Semi-finals 1st-leg v Vietnam
(Vietnam) Trương Đình Luật	(red card) in Group B v Cambodia	Semi-finals 1st-leg v Indonesia
(Vietnam) Quế Ngọc Hải	(yellow card) in Semi-finals (1st leg) v Indonesia; (yellow card) in Semi-finals (2nd leg) v Indonesia	
(Vietnam) Trần Nguyên Mạnh	(red card) in Semi-finals (2nd leg) v Indonesia	

*Players who received a card during the final are not included here.

=== Tournament team rankings ===
This table will show the ranking of teams throughout the tournament.

Pos	Team	Pld	W	D	L	GF	GA	GD	Pts	Final result
1	Thailand	7	6	0	1	15	4	+11	18	Champion
2	Indonesia	7	3	2	2	12	13	−1	11	Runner-up
3	Vietnam	5	3	1	1	8	6	+2	10	Semi-finalists
4	Myanmar	5	2	0	3	5	9	−4	6	Semi-finalists
5	Malaysia	3	1	0	2	3	4	−1	3	Eliminated in group stage
6	Philippines	3	0	2	1	2	3	−1	2	Eliminated in group stage
7	Singapore	3	0	1	2	1	3	−2	1	Eliminated in group stage
8	Cambodia	3	0	0	3	4	8	−4	0	Eliminated in group stage

Source: AFF

== Marketing ==
=== Match balls ===
The official ball for AFF Suzuki Cup 2016 used the Mitre Delta Fluo Hyperseam. Based on the Delta Hyperseam design, the ball will be the first fluo coloured official match ball in the AFF Suzuki Cup.

=== Sponsorship ===
Title sponsor	Official sponsors	Official supporters
Suzuki	Dulux; Epson; GT Radial; Konica Minolta; Toshiba; Yanmar; Z.com	BlueScope; FamilyMart; Hyundai Heavy Industries; Mitre; Nikon Corporation; PINACO

== Media coverage ==
2016 AFF Championship television broadcasters in Southeast Asia
Country	Broadcast network	Television station
Australia	Optus	Optus Sport
Brunei	RTB	RTB1
Cambodia	Bayon Television	BTV News
Indonesia	MNC Media	RCTI (Indonesia matches only), iNews TV
Laos	LNTV	TVLao
Malaysia	RTM	TV2, TVi
Myanmar	MRTV	MRTV-4
Philippines	TV5 Network Inc.	AksyonTV
Singapore	MediaCorp	Okto: Sports on Okto
Thailand	BBTV, TrueVisions	CH7, 7HD (Thailand matches only), True Sports
Timor-Leste	RTTL	TTL
Vietnam	VTV	VTV6
2016 AFF Championship international television broadcasters
Asia-wide	Fox International Channels	Fox Sports Asia

== Incidents and controversies ==
On 23 November, three days before the match between Malaysia and Myanmar, the Malaysian Minister of Youth and Sport Khairy Jamaluddin said that he had petitioned his country football association to boycott Myanmar as the group B host because of Myanmar government's alleged persecution to the Rohingya Muslims after repeated calls from West Malaysian Malay Muslim individuals and political groups of United Malays National Organisation (UMNO), Pan-Malaysian Islamic Party (PAS), People's Justice Party (PKR), National Trust Party (AMANAH) Penang branch as well from Malay extreme group of Pertubuhan Pribumi Perkasa to boycott the country. In response, the ASEAN Football Federation (AFF) warned Malaysia if they suddenly withdraw from the ongoing tournament without giving any valid reasons for the team problems just because of political concerns, the Football Association of Malaysia (FAM) will facing a long-term sanction from FIFA for letting political interference spread into the association. Two days later on 25 November, FAM stated that they will not going to boycott the tournament and said that they would continue playing their last group match against Myanmar, with both of the team coaches playing down the issues before the match. However, in the last group B match, Myanmar shocked Malaysia with a 1–0 score and advance to the semi-finals for the first time since 2004, while Malaysia failed to advance for the first time since 2010.

During the second leg of the semi-final match in Hanoi between Indonesia and Vietnam, the decision by China referee Fu Ming was deemed as bias by most Vietnamese supporters as the referee did not give any action for any fouls committed by the Indonesian side, while heavily punishing the Vietnamese side when their goalkeeper Trần Nguyên Mạnh given a red card on the 76th minute in a sudden controversial decision. Following the heavy disappointment from Vietnamese supporters when their national team failed to qualify for the finals which mainly has been blamed due to the awful decision by the China referee, some Vietnamese supporters who lost their patience follow the Indonesian team bus after the end of the match while the team was on their way back to their hostel, throwing the bus with two large rocks resulting in a slight injury of an Indonesian goalkeeping coach and their team doctor. This was heavily criticised by Indonesian fans for the unsportsmanlike conduct shown by some of the Vietnamese supporters. One of the Indonesian players, Evan Dimas, describes the attacks as "what could end someone's career" as he witnessed "the two big rocks almost hit someone in the face while striking the bus window" which led their bus driver to make a U-turn back to Mỹ Đình National Stadium for protection from the Vietnamese authorities especially when the large angry crowd of motorcyclists began to number and try to surround their bus. A replacement bus was eventually dispatched with heavy security from the Vietnamese authorities following the attacks with the Vietnam Football Federation (VFF) and other Vietnamese fans issuing an apology over the incident.

At the first leg final in Bogor between Indonesia and Thailand, while Thai player Theerathon Bunmathan was taking up a free kick, his face was seen targeted with green laser light from Indonesian supporters. The laser lights continue to be pointed to other Thai players especially to Thai goalkeeper Kawin Thamsatchanan who later complained to Japanese referee Jumpei Iida for the lights that disrupted his concentration. Indonesia scored two goals shortly when Thai players began losing concentration. During the media session shortly after the end of the match, Thai coach Kiatisuk Senamuang openly stated about the laser light attacks affecting their team performances, in which it was also acknowledged by Indonesian coach Alfred Riedl who "criticised and felt shame on the behaviour of some of the Indonesian supporters although they won the first leg match in their home ground as their victory in the match could be perceived as unfair by their team opponent because of the incident". The Indonesian fans would later express their apology to all Thai fans over the incident. However, the Thai coach did not blame the laser incident to Indonesian side as it is "the duty of referee to make call on the incident" and adding that it is caused by "our own players mistake and Indonesian players have showed their great fighting spirit".

At the second leg final in Bangkok, one Indonesian player Abduh Lestaluhu was sent off in the 90th minute after he suddenly kicking the ball to Thai bench players as a sign of protest for their lack of sportsmanship. The incident start when the ball that was out from the touch of Thai defender and rolling towards the Thai bench was held by one of the Thai official sitting in the bench. When he want to take the ball to throw it back into the field, the Thai official refuse to give him in what he describe as "an act of delaying the time" when the Indonesian team are desperately in need to seek at least one quicker goal in the stoppage time to balance the aggregate. The ball was only given when he complained the issue to United Arab Emirates referee Abdulla Hassan, but in the way that he perceive as disrespectful and as a result he kicking the ball to them as a sign of protest where he was then approached by most of the players in the bench and given a red card by the referee. Shortly after he being sent off, he was seen showing his middle finger to Thai fans. His action were however not condemned by most Indonesian supporters and instead been back up by them, with the blame was put to the Thai side for their lacking of sportmanship in the event.

Following the flare throwing incident in the second leg final by Thai supporters comprising mostly from the members of Ultras Thailand shortly after their first leading goal scored by Siroch Chatthong for the Thai national team as well during the end of the match, the Royal Thai Police (RTP) launched an investigation following complains from Thai public that the group has caused damage to the image of Thai football. The Football Association of Thailand (FAT) also been fined with US$30,000 by the Asian Football Confederation (AFC) on 5 January 2017.
