= Trần Đình Đồng =

Vietnamese footballer

Personal information
- Full name: Trần Đình Đồng
- Date of birth: 20 May 1987 (age 39)
- Place of birth: Anh Sơn, Nghệ An, Vietnam
- Height: 1.72 m (5 ft 8 in)
- Position: Defender

Youth career
- 2000–2007: Sông Lam Nghệ An

Senior career*
Years	Team	Apps	(Gls)
2008–2015	Sông Lam Nghệ An	104	(2)
2015–2018	Thanh Hóa	65	(1)
2019–2022	Sông Lam Nghệ An	55	(0)
Total		224	(3)

International career^{‡}
2009–2010	Vietnam U23	5	(0)
2010–2017	Vietnam	22	(0)
- * Club domestic league appearances and goals as of 22 July 2018 ‡ National team caps and goals as of 22 March 2017

Trần Đình Đồng (born 20 May 1987) is a Vietnamese former professional footballer who played as a defender. He played for Sông Lam Nghệ An and was part of the Vietnam national team. He was given a 28-match ban in March 2014 after breaking an opponent's leg.

== Career statistics ==
=== International ===
Appearances and goals by national team and year
National team	Year	Apps	Goals
Vietnam	2010	6	0
Vietnam	2011	1	0
Vietnam	2012	6	0
Vietnam	2016	8	0
Vietnam	2017	1	0
Total		22	0
