= Quỳ Hợp =

- Commune
- Interactive map of Quỳ Hợp
- Coordinates: 19.323837389571633°N 105.18312040838583°E
- Country: Vietnam
- Region: North Central Coast
- Province: Nghệ An
- Established: 16 June 2025

Area
  - Total: 90.07 km^{2} (34.78 sq mi)

Population (2025)
  - Total: 36,929
  - Density: 410/km^{2} (1,100/sq mi)

Quỳ Hợp is a commune in Nghệ An province, Vietnam.

On 16 June 2025, Quỳ Hợp commune was established under Resolution No. 1678/NQ-UBTVQH15, issued by the Standing Committee of the National Assembly of Vietnam. Under the resolution, the entire area and population of Quỳ Hợp township and Châu Đình, Châu Quang, and Thọ Hợp communes, formerly part of Quỳ Hợp district, were merged to form a new commune named Quỳ Hợp.
