= Trương Đình Luật =

Vietnamese footballer

Personal information
- Full name: Trương Đình Luật
- Date of birth: 12 November 1983 (age 42)
- Place of birth: Quỳ Hợp, Nghệ An, Vietnam
- Height: 1.77 m (5 ft 10 in)
- Position: Centre-back

Senior career*
Years	Team	Apps	(Gls)
2003–2010	Navibank Sài Gòn	130	(26)
2011–2013	Xuân Thành Sài Gòn	36	(0)
2011	Vicem Hải Phòng	13	(0)
2014–2016	Becamex Bình Dương	50	(0)
2017–2018	Hồ Chí Minh City	41	(1)
2018–2020	Tây Ninh	15	(3)

International career^{‡}
2004–2006	Vietnam U23	12	(0)
2006–2016	Vietnam	45	(0)

Managerial career
- 2018–2020: Tây Ninh (player-assistant)
- 2020–2021: Sài Gòn (assistant)
- 2022: Tây Ninh
- 2022: Cần Thơ (assistant)
- 2022–2023: Vietnam (assistant)
- 2023: Vietnam U23 (assistant)
- 2024–: Phù Đổng Ninh Bình (assistant)
- * Club domestic league appearances and goals as of 15 September 2019 ‡ National team caps and goals as of 14 May 2014

Trương Đình Luật (born 12 November 1983) is a Vietnamese professional football manager and former player. He is currently the assistant manager of Phù Đổng Ninh Bình.

== Honours ==
=== Club ===
Becamex Bình Dương

- V.League 1:

(gold) Winners : 2014, 2015

- Vietnamese National Cup

(gold) Winners : 2015
(silver) Runners-up :2014

- Vietnamese Super Cup

(gold) Winners : 2014, 2015

- Mekong Club Championship

(gold) Winners : 2014

=== International ===
Vietnam

- AFF Championship

Semi-finalists : 2014, 2016

- AYA Bank Cup

(gold) Winners : 2016
