= Alfred Riedl =

Austrian footballer (1949–2020)

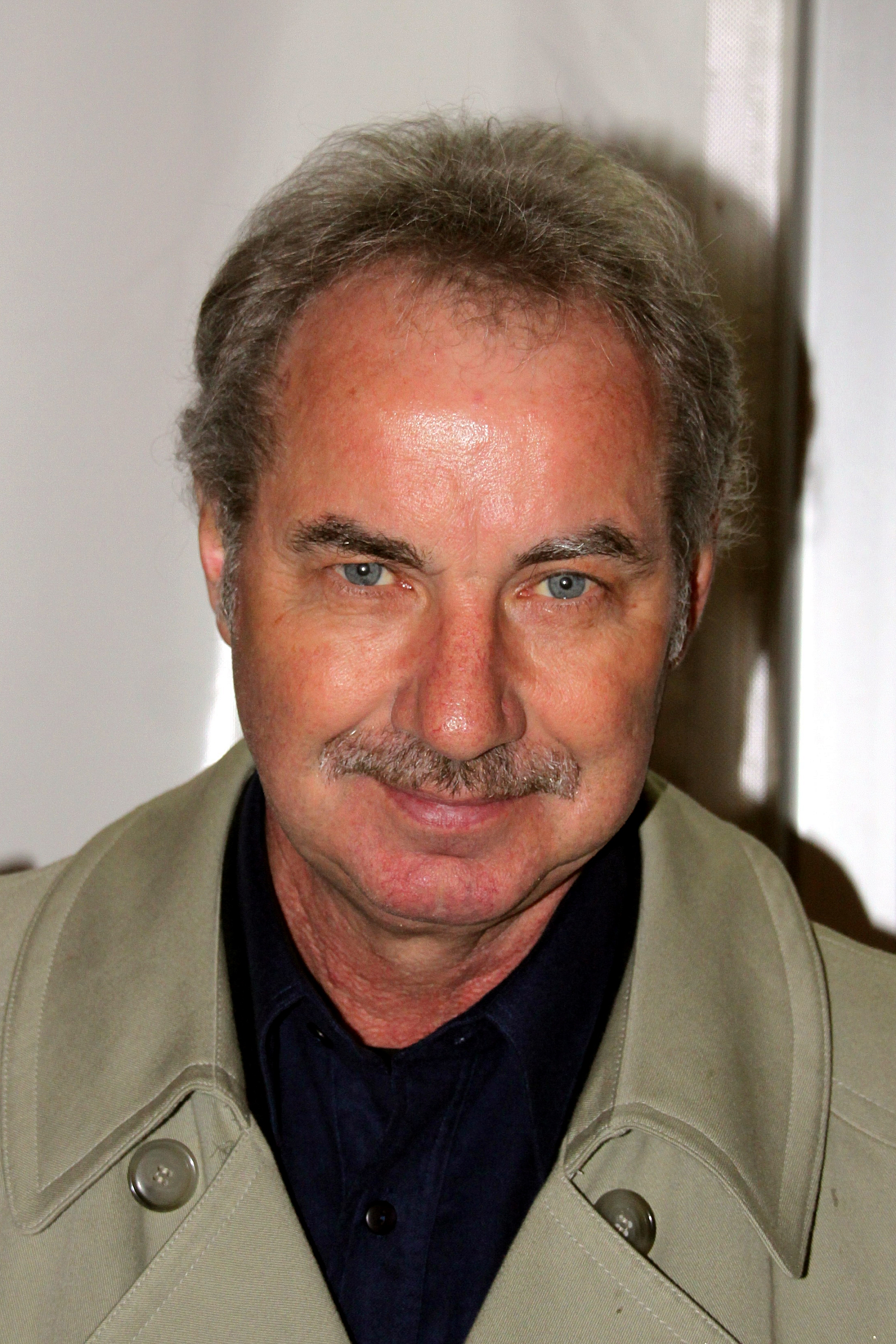
- Riedl in 2010

Personal information
- Date of birth: 2 November 1949
- Place of birth: Vienna, Austria
- Date of death: 8 September 2020 (aged 70)
- Place of death: Pottendorf (Niederösterreich), Austria
- Height: 1.84 m (6 ft 0 in)
- Position: Striker

Youth career
- 1961–1967: ATSV Teesdorf

Senior career*
Years	Team	Apps	(Gls)
1967–1972	Austria Wien	98	(58)
1972–1974	Sint-Truiden	56	(33)
1974–1976	Antwerp	54	(34)
1976–1980	Standard Liège	106	(53)
1980	Metz	19	(6)
1981–1982	Grazer AK	42	(11)
1982–1984	Wiener Sport-Club	52	(15)
1984–1985	VfB Mödling	0	(0)
Total		427	(210)

International career
	Austria U18	5	(0)
	Austria U23	6	(0)
1975–1978	Austria	4	(0)

Managerial career
- 1989–1990: Wiener Sport-Club
- 1990–1991: Austria
- 1991–1993: Favoritner AC
- 1993–1994: Olympique Khouribga
- 1994–1995: Zamalek
- 1997–1998: Liechtenstein
- 1998–2000: Vietnam
- 2001: Khatoco Khánh Hòa
- 2001–2003: Al Salmiya
- 2003–2004: Vietnam
- 2004–2005: Palestine
- 2005–2007: Vietnam
- 2008–2009: Hải Phòng
- 2009–2010: Laos
- 2010–2011: Indonesia
- 2010–2011: Indonesia U23
- 2013–2014: Indonesia
- 2015: PSM Makassar
- 2016: Indonesia
Medal record
Men's football
Representing Vietnam (as manager)
AFF Championship
Runner-up	1998
Representing Indonesia (as manager)
Runner-up	2010
Runner-up	2016
- * Club domestic league appearances and goals

Alfred Riedl (2 November 1949 – 8 September 2020) was an Austrian football manager and player who played as a striker.

== Playing career ==
=== Club career ===
Riedl first played for Austria Wien from 1967 to 1972, before leaving Austria to play for the Belgian club Sint-Truiden at the age of 22. After he played eight seasons in the Belgian First Division (two with Sint-Truiden, two with Royal Antwerp and four with Standard Liège), Riedl enjoyed a brief spell at FC Metz in France. He came back to Austria after a single season there, to play for Grazer AK, and then at Wiener Sportclub and VfB Admira Wacker Mödling.

=== International career ===
Riedl was capped four times for the Austria national football team, making his debut in April 1975 against Hungary.

== Coaching career ==
=== Early career ===
As a manager, Riedl coached Olympique Khouribga, Zamalek, Al Salmiya, and many national teams, including Austria, Liechtenstein and Palestine.

=== Vietnam ===
At the 2007 AFC Asian Cup, he coached Vietnam to a 2–0 victory over the United Arab Emirates and help the team to get to the quarterfinal for the first time in history. Unfortunately, in late 2007, after the team's disappointing performance at the SEA Games 2007, he was fired and replaced by the Portuguese coach Henrique Calisto.

In 2008, he returned to Vietnam to coach Hải Phòng. However, he was dismissed after only three matches.

=== Laos ===
On 9 July 2009, he signed a two-year contract as head coach of Laos.

In 2011, he returned to Laos as national team technical director.

=== Indonesia ===
On 4 May 2010, Riedl was named the new coach of the Indonesia senior and under-23 team. He led Indonesia to the 2010 AFF Suzuki Final but lost to Malaysia on 4–2 aggregate score. Then suddenly, on 13 July 2011, he lost his job because of a "contract dispute", after a highly publicized political power struggle within the Football Association of Indonesia (PSSI), and was replaced by Wim Rijsbergen.

Riedl was reappointed as Indonesia national team head coach in December 2013, signing a three-year contract. His contract was terminated by mutual consent at the end of 2014, after Indonesia failed to qualify for the knockout stages of the 2014 AFF Suzuki Cup.

Riedl then accepted the head coach job of PSM Makassar in early 2015, but resigned in April the same year before the league even started.

Rield returned as the head coach of Indonesia in 2016 on a one-year contract, and guided Indonesia to the finals of 2016 AFF Suzuki Cup. After Indonesia lost to Thailand 3–2 on aggregate in the finals, his contract was not renewed.

== Death ==
Riedl died on 8 September 2020 in Austria due to cancer.

== Honours ==
=== Player ===
Austria Wien

- Austrian Football Championship: 1968–69, 1969–70
- Austrian Cup: 1970–71

Grazer AK

- Austrian Cup: 1980–81

Individual

- Austrian Football Championship top scorer: 1971–72
- Belgian First Division top scorer: 1972–73, 1974–75

=== Manager ===
Olympique Club de Khouribga (Morocco)

- Moroccan Cup runner-up: 1994

Zamalek SC

- Egyptian Confederation Cup: 1995

Vietnam

- AFF Championship runner-up: 1998
- Southeast Asian Games runner-up: 1999
- King's Cup runner-up: 2006

Vietnam Olympic

- Southeast Asian Games runner-up: 2003, 2005

Indonesia

- AFF Championship runner-up: 2010, 2016
