= Sarawut Masuk =

Thai footballer

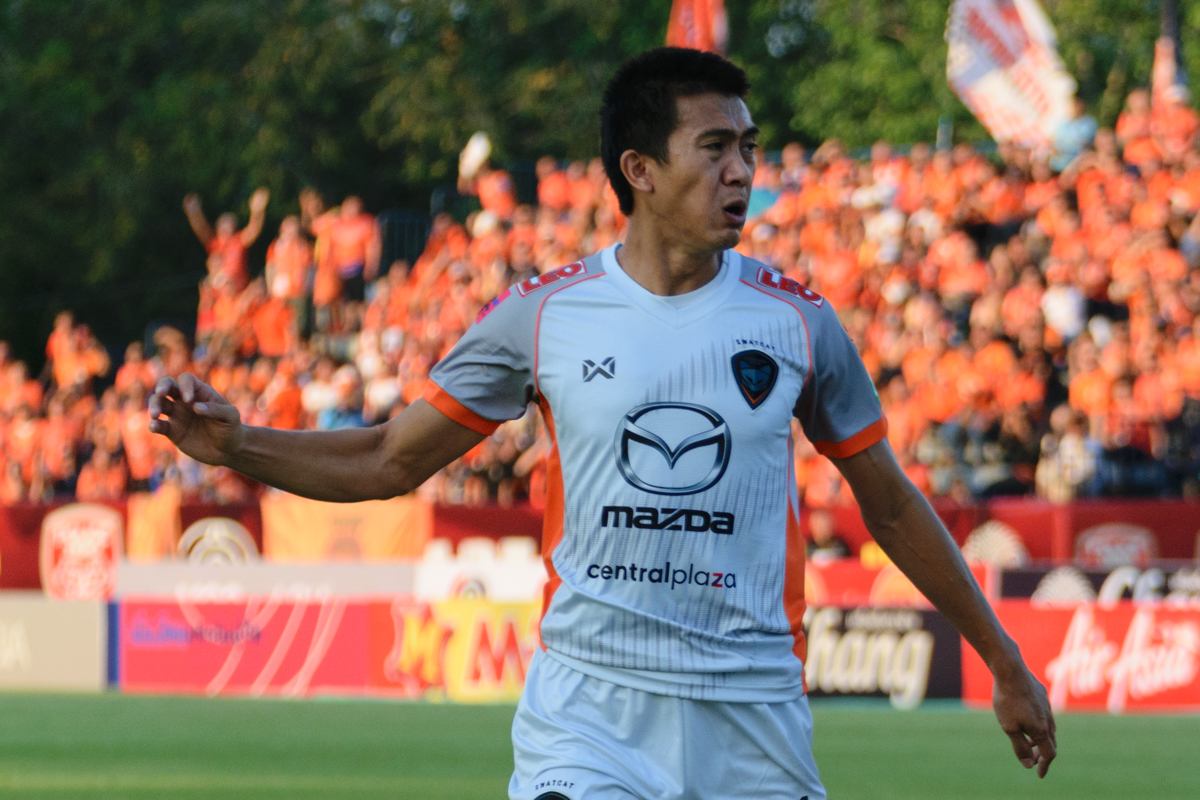

Personal information
- Full name: Sarawut Masuk
- Date of birth: 3 June 1990 (age 36)
- Place of birth: Nong Khai, Thailand
- Height: 1.70 m (5 ft 7 in)
- Positions: Winger; forward

Youth career
- 2003–2008: Nakhon Sawan Sports School
- 2009–2010: Chulalongkorn University

Senior career*
| Years | Team | Apps | (Gls) |
| 2011–2012 | Chamchuri United | 40 | (16) |
| 2012–2015 | Muangthong United | 46 | (4) |
| 2015 | → Nakhon Ratchasima (loan) | 25 | (1) |
| 2016–2019 | BG Pathum United | 44 | (5) |
| 2018 | → Nakhon Ratchasima (loan) | 14 | (2) |
| 2019 | → PTT Rayong (loan) | 17 | (0) |
| 2020 | Nongbua Pitchaya | 2 | (0) |
| 2020–2022 | Chiangmai United | 40 | (6) |
| 2022 | Udon Thani | 2 | (0) |
| 2022 | Ayutthaya United | 3 | (0) |
| Total | | 233 | (34) |

International career
| 2007 | Thailand U19 | 6 | (2) |
| 2013 | Thailand U23 | 4 | (1) |
| 2011–2016 | Thailand | 24 | (4) |
Medal record
Thailand under-23
Sea Games
| Winner | Sea Games 2013 | Football |
Thailand
Asean Football Championship
| Winner | AFF Suzuki Cup 2014 | 2014 |
| Winner | AFF Suzuki Cup 2016 | 2016 |
- * Club domestic league appearances and goals

Sarawut Masuk (Thai: ศราวุฒิ มาสุข), simply known as Nui (Thai: หนุ่ย), is a Thai retired professional footballer who played as a winger.

== International career ==
He made his international debut for Thailand in a friendly match against Jordan on 6 October 2011. He scored a goal against China for Thailand in a friendly match. He represented Thailand U23 in the 2013 Southeast Asian Games. Sarawut is also part of Thailand's squad in the 2014 AFF Suzuki Cup. In May 2015, he was called up by Thailand to play in the 2018 FIFA World Cup qualification (AFC) against Vietnam.

=== International ===
As of 17 December 2016

| National team | Year | Apps | Goals |
|---|---|---|---|
| Thailand | 2011 | 1 | 0 |
| Thailand | 2012 | 1 | 0 |
| Thailand | 2013 | 1 | 1 |
| Thailand | 2014 | 7 | 0 |
| Thailand | 2015 | 5 | 0 |
| Thailand | 2016 | 9 | 3 |
| Thailand | Total | 24 | 4 |

=== International goals ===
==== Under-23 ====
| # | Date | Venue | Opponent | Score | Result | Competition |
|---|---|---|---|---|---|---|
| 1. | 21 December 2013 | Naypyidaw, Myanmar | Indonesia | 1–0 | 1–0 | 2013 Southeast Asian Games |

==== Senior ====
| No | Date | Venue | Opponent | Score | Result | Competition |
|---|---|---|---|---|---|---|
| 1. | 15 June 2013 | Hefei Olympic Sports Center Stadium, Hefei, China | China | 5–1 | 5–1 | Friendly |
| 2. | 22 November 2016 | Philippine Sports Stadium, Bocaue, Philippines | Singapore | 1–0 | 1–0 | 2016 AFF Championship |
| 3. | 25 November 2016 | Philippine Sports Stadium, Bocaue, Philippines | Philippines | 1–0 | 1–0 | 2016 AFF Championship |
| 4. | 8 December 2016 | Rajamangala Stadium, Bangkok, Thailand | Myanmar | 1–0 | 4–0 | 2016 AFF Championship |

== Honours ==
=== Clubs ===
Muangthong United

- Thai Premier League (1): 2012

=== International ===
Thailand U-23

- Sea Games Gold Medal (1); 2013

Thailand

- ASEAN Football Championship (2): 2014, 2016
- King's Cup (1): 2016
