= Fachruddin Aryanto =

Indonesian footballer (born 1989)

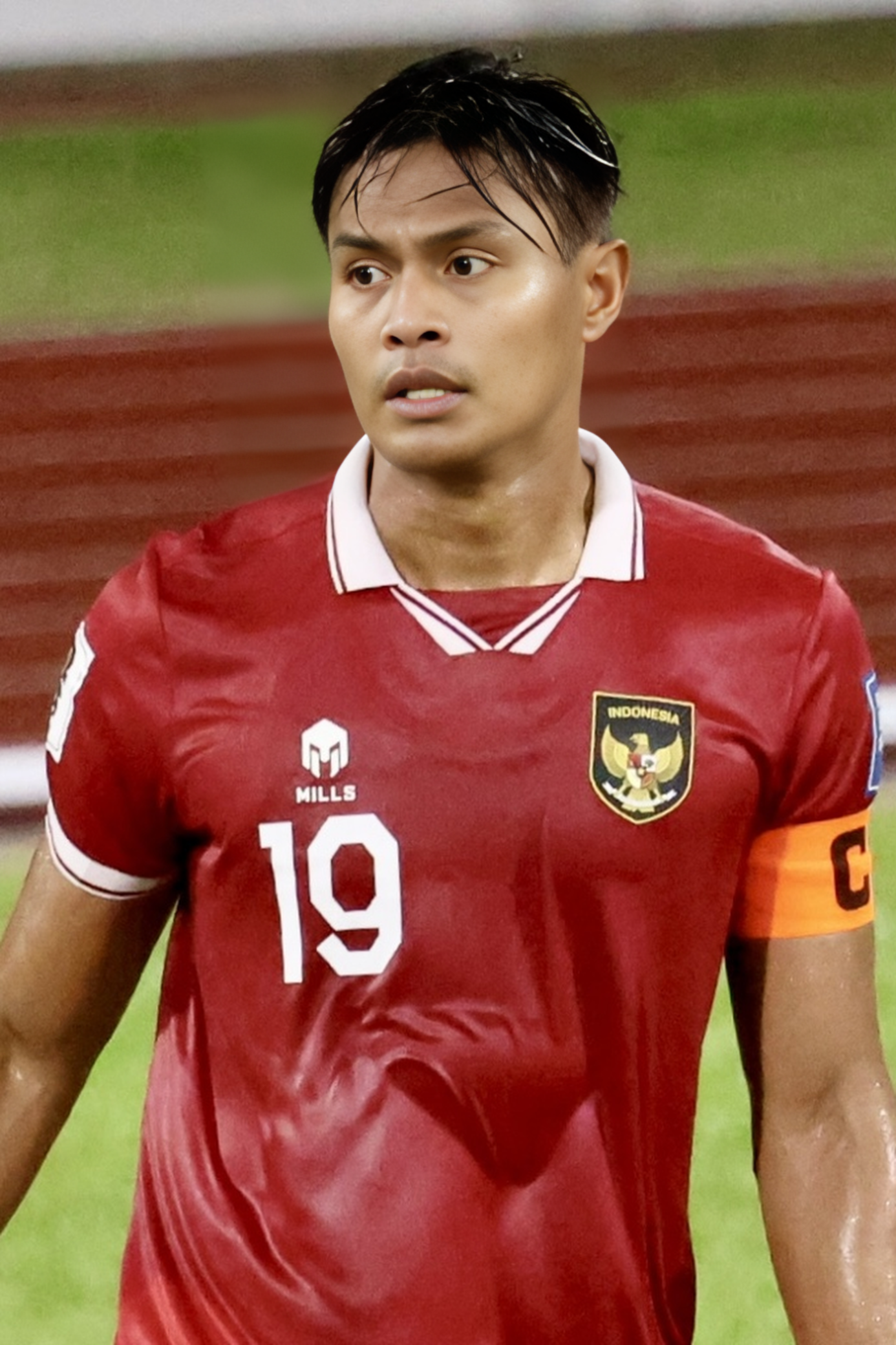
- Fachruddin playing for Indonesia in 2023

Personal information
- Full name: Fachruddin Wahyudi Aryanto
- Date of birth: 19 February 1989 (age 37)
- Place of birth: Klaten, Indonesia
- Height: 1.85 m (6 ft 1 in)
- Position: Centre-back

Team information
- Current team: PSS Sleman
- Number: 19

Youth career
- SSB Satria Pandawa

Senior career*
| Years | Team | Apps | (Gls) |
| 2008–2012 | PSS Sleman | 48 | (0) |
| 2013–2014 | Persepam Madura | 49 | (0) |
| 2015–2016 | Sriwijaya | 24 | (1) |
| 2017–2024 | Madura United | 136 | (4) |
| 2019 | → Persija Jakarta (loan) | 19 | (0) |
| 2024– | PSS Sleman | 39 | (1) |

International career
| 2022 | Indonesia SEA Games (O.P.) | 6 | (1) |
| 2012–2023 | Indonesia | 57 | (4) |
Medal record
Men's football
Representing Indonesia
Southeast Asian Games
| Bronze medal – third place | 2021 Vietnam | Team |
AFF Championship
| Runner-up | 2016 Myanmar & Philippines | Team |
| Runner-up | 2020 Singapore | Team |
- * Club domestic league appearances and goals as of 23:15, 9 May 2026 (UTC)

Fachruddin Wahyudi Aryanto (born 19 February 1989) is an Indonesian professional footballer who plays as a centre-back for Championship club PSS Sleman.

== Club career ==
=== Persepam Madura Utama ===
He was signed for Persepam Madura Utama to play in Indonesia Super League in the 2013 season. Fachruddin made his league debut on 16 January 2013 in a match against Persela Lamongan at the Surajaya Stadium, Lamongan.

=== Sriwijaya ===
On 12 November 2014, Fachruddin was signed for Sriwijaya to play in the Indonesia Super League in the 2015 season. He made his debut on 4 April 2015 in a match against Persipasi Bandung Raya at the Gelora Sriwijaya Stadium, Palembang.

=== Madura United ===
He was signed for Madura United to play in Liga 1 in the 2017 season. Fachruddin made his debut on 16 April 2017 in a match against Bali United. On 26 September 2017, Fachruddin scored his first goal for Madura United against Persegres Gresik United in the 72nd minute at the Petrokimia Stadium, Gresik. On 13 October 2017, he scored the opening goal in a match against Borneo with scoring from header in the 35th minute. On 5 November 2017, he scored in a 3–1 win over Barito Putera. On 8 December 2018, he scored the opening goal in a 2–1 win against Persela Lamongan.

==== Persija Jakarta (loan) ====
In 2019, Fachruddin was signed for Persija Jakarta to play in the Liga 1, on loan from Madura United. He made his debut on 1 September 2019 in a match against Badak Lampung at the Patriot Candrabaga Stadium, Bekasi.

== International career ==
Fachruddin made his first international caps for Indonesia in a match against Laos in the 2012 AFF Championship. He scored his first international goal for Indonesia in a match against Philippines in the 2016 AFF Championship

Fachruddin was called up as one of the three overage players for the 2021 SEA Games, also captained the U23 national team. He scored a goal against Timor-Leste U23. And help the team win the bronze medal.

Fachruddin also captained the national team at the 2023 Asian Cup qualification at Kuwait. He scored his third international senior goals against Nepal in a 7–0 win, helping the team qualify for the 2023 AFC Asian Cup.

On 24 September 2022, Fachruddin scored his fourth goal, through a header from Pratama Arhan's long throw-in, in a friendly match against Curaçao in a 3–2 win.

== Career statistics ==
=== International ===
As of match played 17 October 2023

Appearances and goals by national team and year
| National team | Year | Apps | Goals |
|---|---|---|---|
| Indonesia | 2012 | 4 | 0 |
| Indonesia | 2013 | 2 | 0 |
| Indonesia | 2014 | 5 | 0 |
| Indonesia | 2015 | 1 | 0 |
| Indonesia | 2016 | 10 | 1 |
| Indonesia | 2017 | 4 | 0 |
| Indonesia | 2018 | 8 | 1 |
| Indonesia | 2021 | 7 | 0 |
| Indonesia | 2022 | 12 | 2 |
| Indonesia | 2023 | 4 | 0 |
| Total | | 57 | 4 |

As of match played 17 October 2023
Scores and results list Indonesia's goal tally first, score column indicates score after each Fachruddin goal.

List of international goals scored by Fachruddin Aryanto
| No. | Date | Venue | Cap | Opponent | Score | Result | Competition |
|---|---|---|---|---|---|---|---|
| 1 | 22 November 2016 | Philippine Sports Stadium, Bocaue, Philippines | 18 | Philippines | 1–0 | 2–2 | 2016 AFF Championship |
| 2 | 17 November 2018 | Rajamangala Stadium, Bangkok, Thailand | 33 | Thailand | 2–4 | 2–4 | 2018 AFF Championship |
| 3 | 14 June 2022 | Jaber Al-Ahmad International Stadium, Kuwait City, Kuwait | 50 | Nepal | 3–0 | 7–0 | 2023 AFC Asian Cup qualification |
| 4 | 24 September 2022 | Gelora Bandung Lautan Api Stadium, Bandung, Indonesia | 51 | Curaçao | 2–1 | 3–2 | Friendly |

== Honours ==
=== Club ===
PSS Sleman

- Championship runner up: 2025–26

=== International ===
Indonesia

- AFF Championship runner-up: 2016, 2020
- Aceh World Solidarity Cup runner-up: 2017

Indonesia SEA Games

- SEA Games bronze medal: 2021

=== Individual ===
- Liga 1 Best XI: 2018
- Indonesia Soccer Championship A Best XI: 2016

| Preceded by Evan Dimas | Indonesian Captain; 2022–2023 | Succeeded by Asnawi Mangkualam |
