= Lerby Eliandry =

Indonesian association football player

Personal information
- Full name: Lerby Eliandry Pong Babu
- Date of birth: 21 November 1991 (age 34)
- Place of birth: Samarinda, Indonesia
- Height: 1.80 m (5 ft 11 in)
- Position: Striker

Youth career
- 2011–2012: Putra Samarinda

Senior career*
Years	Team	Apps	(Gls)
2012–2014	Putra Samarinda	21	(5)
2015	Bali United	2	(3)
2016–2020	Borneo Samarinda	106	(40)
2020–2023	Bali United	38	(6)
2023–2024	Madura United	0	(0)
2024	Persibo Bojonegoro	4	(0)
2025	PSPS Pekanbaru	6	(1)
2025–2026	Persiku Kudus	15	(0)

International career
2014	Indonesia U23	1	(0)
2016–2019	Indonesia	12	(2)
Medal record
Men's football
Representing Indonesia
AFF Championship
Runner-up	2016 Myanmar & Philippines	Team
- * Club domestic league appearances and goals as of 3 May 2026

Lerby Eliandry Pong Babu (born 21 November 1991) is an Indonesian professional footballer who plays as a striker.

== Club career ==
=== Bali United ===
Lerby started his career in 2015 Indonesia Super League with a good record. He made three goals in two games, and he managed to equal his total goal scores in last season. Lerby scored all three goals for Bali United against Perseru Serui and Persipura Jayapura.

=== Borneo Samarinda ===
Lerby joined in early 2016. and made his debut in the 2016 East Kalimantan Governor Cup and 2016 Indonesia Soccer Championship A. Lerby scored his debut in the seventh week against Persegres Gresik United. He coming as a substitute.

=== Return to Bali United ===
On 5 January 2020, it was confirmed that Lerby would re-join Bali United, signing a year contract. He made his league debut on 1 March 2020 in a match against Persita Tangerang. On 6 March 2020, Lerby scored his first goal for Bali United against Barito Putera in the 66th minute. This season was suspended on 27 March 2020 due to the COVID-19 pandemic. The season was abandoned and was declared void on 20 January 2021.

== International career ==
Lerby made his senior international debut at the 2016 AFF Championship against Thailand on 19 November 2016, where he scored Indonesia's second goal.

== Personal life ==
An ethnic Toraja named after Danish legend Søren Lerby, Lerby is a devout Protestant Christian who routinely listens to religious Christian music before games, a fact he keeps private from his predominantly Muslim teammates and coaches. He is married to Risma Syahrozad since 22 May 2017.

== Career statistics ==
=== Club ===
As of match played 3 May 2026

Club statistics
Club	Season	League			Cup		Continental		Other		Total	
Club	Season	Division	Apps	Goals	Apps	Goals	Apps	Goals	Apps	Goals	Apps	Goals
Putra Samarinda	2013	Indonesia Super League	8	2	0	0	–		0	0	8	2
Putra Samarinda	2014	Indonesia Super League	13	3	0	0	–		0	0	13	3
Putra Samarinda	Total		21	5	0	0	–		0	0	21	5
Bali United	2015	Indonesia Super League	2	3	0	0	–		5	4	7	7
Borneo Samarinda	2016	ISC A	20	6	0	0	–		0	0	20	6
Borneo Samarinda	2017	Liga 1	32	16	0	0	–		0	0	32	16
Borneo Samarinda	2018	Liga 1	28	8	0	0	–		0	0	28	8
Borneo Samarinda	2019	Liga 1	26	10	3 (Note: Includes Piala Indonesia)	2	–		2 (Note: Appearances in Indonesia President's Cup)	0	31	12
Borneo Samarinda	Total		106	40	3	2	–		2	0	111	42
Bali United	2020	Liga 1	2	1	0	0	3 (Note: Appearances in AFC Cup)	0	0	0	5	1
Bali United	2021–22	Liga 1	23	3	0	0	0	0	2 (Note: Appearances in Menpora Cup)	0	25	3
Bali United	2022–23	Liga 1	13	2	0	0	1	0	3	0	17	2
Bali United	Total		38	6	0	0	4	0	5	0	47	6
Madura United	2023–24	Liga 1	0	0	0	0	–		0	0	0	0
Persibo Bojonegoro	2024–25	Liga 2	4	0	0	0	–		0	0	4	0
PSPS Pekanbaru	2024–25	Liga 2	6	1	0	0	–		0	0	6	1
Persiku Kudus	2025–26	Liga 2	15	0	0	0	–		0	0	15	0
Career total			192	55	3	2	4	0	12	4	211	61

=== International ===
As of match played 15 October 2019

Appearances and goals by national team and year
National team	Year	Apps	Goals
Indonesia	2016	9	1
Indonesia	2017	2	1
Indonesia	2019	1	0
Total		12	2

=== International goals ===
Scores and results list Indonesia's goal tally first.

#	Date	Venue	Opponent	Score	Result	Competition
1.	19 November 2016	Philippine Sports Stadium, Bocaue, Philippines	Thailand	2–2	2–4	2016 AFF Championship
2.	4 October 2017	Patriot Stadium, Bekasi, Indonesia	Cambodia	1–0	3–1	Friendly

== Honours ==
=== Club ===
Persisam Putra Samarinda U-21

- Indonesia Super League U-21 runner-up: 2012

Borneo

- Indonesia President's Cup runner-up: 2017

Bali United

- Liga 1: 2021–22

=== International ===
Indonesia

- AFF Championship runner-up: 2016
