= Siroch Chatthong =

Thai footballer

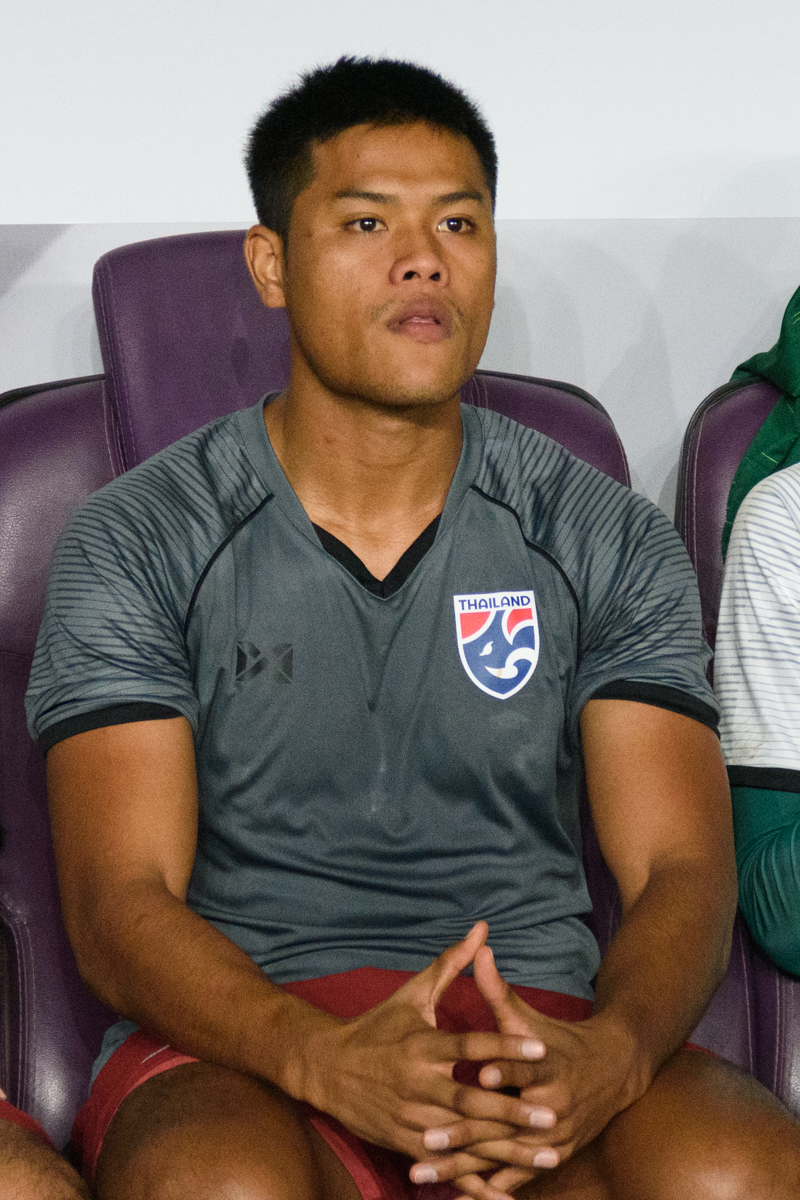
- Siroch Chatthong in 2019

Personal information
- Full name: Siroch Chatthong
- Date of birth: 8 December 1992 (age 33)
- Place of birth: Surin, Thailand
- Height: 1.88 m (6 ft 2 in)
- Positions: Winger; forward

Team information
- Current team: Uthai Thani

Youth career
- 2008–2009: Surin Technical College
- 2011: BEC Tero Sasana

Senior career*
Years	Team	Apps	(Gls)
2011	Surin City	0	(0)
2012	Nonthaburi	7	(3)
2013–2015	BCC Tero	54	(17)
2016–2017	Ubon UMT United	43	(6)
2017–2018	Muangthong United	21	(0)
2018–2019	PT Prachuap	35	(3)
2020–2023	BG Pathum United	28	(2)
2021–2022	→ Chiangrai United (loan)	10	(0)
2022–2023	→ Nakhon Ratchasima (loan)	25	(0)
2023–2024	Lamphun Warriors	26	(2)
2024–2026	Sukhothai	55	(7)
2026–	Uthai Thani	0	(0)

International career^{‡}
2016–2019	Thailand	25	(3)
Medal record
Thailand
Asean Football Championship
Winner	AFF Suzuki Cup 2016	2016
- * Club domestic league appearances and goals as of 02:29, 29 January 2026 (UTC) ‡ National team caps and goals as of 6 January 2019

Siroch Chatthong (Thai: สิโรจน์ ฉัตรทอง, born 8 December 1992), simply known as Pipo (Thai: ปีโป้), is a Thai professional footballer who plays as a winger or a forward for Thai League 1 club Uthai Thani and the Thailand national team.

== International career ==
In August 2016, he made his debut for Thailand as a substitute in an away friendly match against Qatar. In the following month, September 2016, he was a substitute again for Thailand replacing Narubadin Weerawatnodom in the 2018 World Cup qualifying against Japan at Rajamangala Stadium.

=== International ===
As of 6 January 2019

National team	Year	Apps	Goals
Thailand	2016	12	3
Thailand	2017	9	0
Thailand	2018	3	0
Thailand	2019	1	0
Total		25	3

=== International goals ===
==== Senior ====
No	Date	Venue	Opponent	Score	Result	Competition
1.	8 December 2016	Rajamangala Stadium, Bangkok, Thailand	Myanmar	3–0	4–0	2016 AFF Championship
2.	17 December 2016	Rajamangala Stadium, Bangkok, Thailand	Indonesia	1–0	2–0	2016 AFF Championship
3.	17 December 2016	Rajamangala Stadium, Bangkok, Thailand	Indonesia	2–0	2–0	2016 AFF Championship

== Honours ==
=== Club ===
Muangthong United

- Thai League Cup: 2017
- Mekong Club Championship: 2017

PT Prachuap FC

- Thai League Cup: 2019

BG Pathum United

- Thai League 1: 2020–21

=== International ===
Thailand

- AFF Championship: 2016
- King's Cup: 2017
