= Hansamu Yama Pranata =

Indonesian footballer (born 1995)

Hansamu Yama
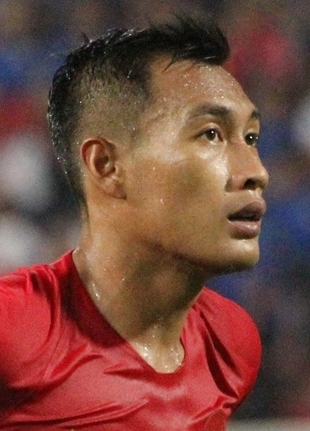
- Hansamu playing for Indonesia at the 2018 AFF Championship

Personal information
- Full name: Hansamu Yama Pranata
- Date of birth: 16 January 1995 (age 31)
- Place of birth: Mojokerto, Indonesia
- Height: 1.82 m (6 ft 0 in)
- Position: Centre-back

Team information
- Current team: Arema
- Number: 66

Youth career
- 2010–2011: SSB Mojokerto Muda
- 2012–2013: Deportivo Indonesia

Senior career*
Years	Team	Apps	(Gls)
2014–2018	Barito Putera	59	(3)
2019–2021	Persebaya Surabaya	22	(1)
2021–2022	Bhayangkara	19	(2)
2022–2026	Persija Jakarta	61	(3)
2026	→ Arema (loan)	14	(2)
2026–	Arema	6	(0)

International career
2013–2014	Indonesia U19	25	(1)
2015–2018	Indonesia U23	23	(1)
2016–2022	Indonesia	19	(2)
Medal record
Men's football
Representing Indonesia
AFF U-19 Youth Championship
Winner	2013 Indonesia
Southeast Asian Games
Bronze medal – third place	2017 Kuala Lumpur	Team
AFF Championship
Runner-up	2016 Myanmar & Philippines	Team
- * Club domestic league appearances and goals as of 20 November 2026

Hansamu Yama Pranata (born 16 January 1995) is an Indonesian professional footballer who plays as a centre-back for Indonesian Super League club Arema.

== Club career ==
=== Barito Putera ===
On 21 October 2014, Hansamu signed a three-year contract with Barito Putera to commence ahead of the 2015 Indonesia Super League. He made his debut on 4 April 2015 as starting line-up, which ended 2–0 victory against Persela Lamongan. On 10 September 2017, Hansamu scored his first official league goal for Barito Putera in a 2–0 win over Sriwijaya at the 17th May Stadium. On 21 September 2017, He scored in 53rd minute and saved Barito Putera from losing to Persipura Jayapura, score draw 1–1.

In January 2019, Barito Putera management announced that Hansamu will not renew his contract for next season, due to family reasons, he will move to Mojokerto, because he will marry his girlfriend and live there.

=== Persebaya Surabaya ===
On 16 January 2019, Hamsamu signed a one-year contract with Persebaya Surabaya on a free transfer. On 16 February 2019, Hansamu made his first appearance in the Round of 32 2018–19 Piala Indonesia in an 8–0 home win against Liga 3 club Persinga Ngawi. and made his league debut for Persebaya on 16 May in a lost 2–1 against Bali United.

On 29 February 2020, Hansamu scored his first goal for Persebaya in a 1–1 draw over Persik Kediri at the Gelora Bung Tomo Stadium. After that, one month later, This season was suspended on 27 March 2020 due to the COVID-19 pandemic. The season was abandoned and was declared void on 20 January 2021.

=== Bhayangkara ===
On 5 May 2021, Hansamu signed a one-year contract with Bhayangkara to commence ahead of the 2021–22 Liga 1. He made his league debut on 29 August 2021 as starting line-up, which ended 2–1 victory against Persiraja Banda Aceh. On 31 October 2021, Hansamu scored his first league goal for the club in Liga 1, opening the scoring in a 0–1 won against Persikabo 1973.

On 20 February 2022, he scored the opening goal in a 4–0 win over Persikabo 1973; the latter result saw Bhayangkara move to 2nd position in the league table. During the 2021–22 season, he made 19 league appearances and scored 2 goals for Bhayangkara.

=== Persija Jakarta ===
Hansamu signed for Persija Jakarta to play in Liga 1 in the 2022–23 season. He made his league debut on 31 July 2022 in a match against Persis Solo at the Patriot Candrabhaga Stadium, Bekasi.

On 15 January 2023, he scored his first league goal for the club from header in a 3–2 win over Bali United, he was also selected as man of the match in that match. On 22 February, Hansamu scored the winning goal in injury time, in a 2–1 against PS Barito Putera, and scored another the winning goal for the team in injury time in a 1–0 away win over Dewa United at Indomilk Arena on 10 April.

==== Arema (loan) ====
On 31 January 2026, Hansamu officially joined Arema on loan until the end of the season.

== International career ==
Hansamu made his debut for the Indonesia U-23 on 10 February 2015 against Syria U-23 in the friendly.

Hansamu made his debut for the senior team on 3 December 2016 against Vietnam in the 2016 AFF Championship and opened the scoring with a header from a corner kick in the seventh minute in an eventual 2–1 win. On 14 December 2016, he scored the winning goal against Thailand in the 70th minute which contributed to Indonesia's eventual 2–1 victory.

Hansamu was included in the final 23-man squad for the 2022 AFF Championship by Shin Tae-Yong.

== Career statistics ==
=== Club ===
As of match played 20 November 2026

Club	Season	League			Cup (Note: Includes Piala Indonesia)		League cup (Note: Includes I-League Cup)		Continental		Other		Total	
Club	Season	Division	Apps	Goals	Apps	Goals	Apps	Goals	Apps	Goals	Apps	Goals	Apps	Goals
Barito Putera	2015	Indonesia Super League	3	0	0	0	0	0	–		0	0	3	0
Barito Putera	2016	ISC A	17	1	0	0	0	0	–		0	0	17	1
Barito Putera	2017	Liga 1	20	2	0	0	0	0	–		0	0	20	2
Barito Putera	2018	Liga 1	19	0	0	0	0	0	–		0	0	19	0
Barito Putera	Total		59	3	0	0	0	0	–		0	0	59	3
Persebaya Surabaya	2019	Liga 1	20	0	3	1	0	0	–		6 (Note: Appearance(s) in Piala Presiden)	1	29	2
Persebaya Surabaya	2020	Liga 1	2	1	0	0	0	0	–		0	0	2	1
Persebaya Surabaya	Total		22	1	3	1	0	0	–		6	1	31	3
Bhayangkara	2021–22	Liga 1	19	2	0	0	0	0	–		3 (Note: Appearances in Menpora Cup)	0	22	2
Persija Jakarta	2022–23	Liga 1	24	3	0	0	0	0	–		2	0	26	3
Persija Jakarta	2023–24	Liga 1	14	0	0	0	0	0	–		0	0	14	0
Persija Jakarta	2024–25	Liga 1	19	0	0	0	0	0	–		0	0	19	0
Persija Jakarta	2025–26	Super League	4	0	0	0	0	0	–		0	0	4	0
Persija Jakarta	Total		61	3	0	0	0	0	–		5	0	66	3
Arema (loan)	2025–26	Super League	14	2	0	0	0	0	–		0	0	14	2
Arema	2026–27	Super League	6	0	0	0	1	0	–		4	0	11	0
Arema	Total		20	2	0	0	1	0	–		4	0	25	2
Career total			181	11	4	1	1	0	0	0	15	1	200	13

=== International ===
As of match played 26 December 2022

Appearances and goals by national team and year
National team	Year	Apps	Goals
Indonesia	2016	4	2
Indonesia	2017	1	0
Indonesia	2018	7	0
Indonesia	2019	6	0
Indonesia	2022	1	0
Total		19	2

=== International goals ===
International under-23 goals

No.	Date	Venue	Opponent	Score	Result	Competition
1.	27 March 2015	Gelora Bung Karno Stadium, Jakarta, Indonesia	Timor-Leste	5–0	5–0	2016 AFC U-23 Championship qualification

International senior goals

#	Date	Venue	Opponent	Score	Result	Competition
1.	3 December 2016	Pakansari Stadium, Bogor, Indonesia	Vietnam	1–0	2–1	2016 AFF Championship
2.	14 December 2016	Pakansari Stadium, Bogor, Indonesia	Thailand	2–1	2–1	2016 AFF Championship

== Honours ==
Persebaya Surabaya

- Indonesia President's Cup runner-up: 2019
- East Java Governor Cup: 2020

Indonesia U-19

- AFF U-19 Youth Championship: 2013

Indonesia U-23

- SEA Games bronze medal: 2017

Indonesia

- AFF Championship runner-up: 2016
- Aceh World Solidarity Cup runner-up: 2017

Individual

- Liga 1 Best XI: 2018

Preceded by Boaz Solossa	Indonesian Captain; 2018	Succeeded by Andritany Ardhiyasa
