= 2013 in Malaysian football =

Football in Malaysia
- Season: 2013

Men's football
- Super League: LionsXII
- Premier League: Sarawak
- FAM League: Penang
- FA Cup: Kelantan
- Malaysia Cup: Pahang
- Community Shield: ATM

The 2013 season is the 34th season of competitive football in Malaysia.

== Coaching changes ==
=== Pre-season ===
Club	Outgoing Head Coach	Date of vacancy	Manner of departure	Incoming Head Coach	Date of appointment
Terengganu FA	Peter James Butler	17 September 2012	Suspended for 6 months(Suspending ended by FAM. Later signed by T-Team)	E. Elavarasan	18 October 2012
T-Team FC	Yunus Alif	September 2012	Resigned	Peter James Butler	18 November 2012
FELDA United FC	E. Elavarasan	18 October 2012	Signed by Terengganu FA	K. Devan	1 November 2012
Johor Darul Takzim	Sazali Saidon	31 October 2012	Contract Expired	Fandi Ahmad	1 November 2012
Perak FA	Jang Jung	31 October 2012	Contract Expired	Mohd Azraai Khor Abdullah	1 November 2012
Negeri Sembilan FA	Mohd Azraai Khor Abdullah	31 October 2012	Contract Expired	Divaldo Alves	1 November 2012

=== In season ===
Club	Outgoing Head Coach	Date of vacancy	Manner of departure	Incoming Head Coach	Date of appointment
T-Team FC	Peter James Butler	16 May 2013	Mutual Termination	Eduardo Almeida	16 May 2013

== National teams competitions ==
=== Men's senior team ===
Date	Opponent	Score*	Venue	Competition	Malaysia scorers
1 February	Iraq	0–3 (L)	Al-Rashid Stadium, Dubai (A)	Friendly Training^{1}	
6 February	Qatar	0–2 (L)	Jassim Bin Hamad Stadium, Doha (A)	2015 AFC Asian Cup qualification	
17 March	Saudi Arabia	1–4 (L)	Shah Alam Stadium, Shah Alam (H)	Friendly Training^{1}	Safiq Rahim 70'
22 March	Yemen	2–1 (W)	Shah Alam Stadium, Shah Alam (H)	2015 AFC Asian Cup qualification	Azamuddin 27'; Khyril Muhymeen 80'
26 March	Palestine	0–2 (L)	Darul Makmur Stadium, Kuantan (H)	Friendly Training^{1}	
6 June	(Australia) Canberra XI	2–3 (L)	Deakin Stadium, Canberra (A)	Friendly Training^{1}	Safee Sali 61', 83'
11 June	(Australia) Sydney Olympic	4–0 (W)	Belmore Sports Ground, Sydney (A)	Friendly Training^{1}	Safiq Rahim 9'; Amri Yahyah 50', 73', 90'
13 June	(Australia) Marconi Stallions	0–2 (L)	Marconi Stadium, Sydney (A)	Friendly Training^{1}	
16 July	(Thailand) Chonburi	0–0 (D)	National Stadium, Bukit Jalil (H)	Friendly Match^{XI} ^{1}	
21 July	(England) Chelsea	1–4 (L)	Shah Alam Stadium, Shah Alam (H)	Friendly Match^{XI} ^{1}	Fadhli Shas 90+1'
25 July	(Japan) Shimizu S-Pulse	0–2 (L)	Miho Ground, Shizuoka (A)	Friendly Match^{XI} ^{1}	
27 July	(Japan) Shonan Bellmare	0–5 (L)	Banyu Artificial Turf Soccer Field, Hiratsuka (A)	Friendly Match^{XI} ^{1}	
31 July	(Japan) Tokyo Verdy	0–5 (L)	Tama City Athletic Stadium, Tama, Tokyo (A)	Friendly Match^{XI} ^{1}	
10 August	(Spain) Barcelona	1–3 (L)	Shah Alam Stadium (H)	Friendly Match^{XI} ^{1}	Amri Yahyah 39'
10 September	China	0–2 (L)	Tianjin Olympic Stadium (A)	Friendly Match	
9 October	United Arab Emirates	1–3 (L)	(A)	Friendly Match^{1}	Safiq (?)
15 October	Bahrain	1–1 (D)	Bukit Jalil Stadium, Kuala Lumpur (H)	2015 AFC Asian Cup qualification	Norshahrul 71'
8 November	Kuwait	0–3 (L)	Al-Sadaqua Walsalam Stadium, Kuwait City (A)	Friendly Match	
15 November	Bahrain	0–1 (L)	Bahrain National Stadium, Riffa (A)	2015 AFC Asian Cup qualification	
19 November	Qatar	0–1 (L)	Bukit Jalil Stadium, Kuala Lumpur (H)	2015 AFC Asian Cup qualification	

- ^{1} Non FIFA 'A' international match
- ^{XI} Malaysia uses a selection of players from the Malaysia Super League, Using the name Malaysia XI

=== Men's under-23 team ===
==== 2013 Summer Universiade ====
===== Group stage =====
Team	Pld	W	D	L	GF	GA	GD	Pts
Great Britain	2	1	0	1	2	1	+1	3
Malaysia	2	1	0	1	2	2	0	3
Italy	2	1	0	1	1	2	−1	3

5 July 2013 Summer Universiade (Pool C)	Italy	0 – 2	Malaysia	Raketa Stadium
20:00		Report	Thamil 21'; Saarvindran 87' (pen.)	Referee: Jorge Rojas (Mexico)

8 July 2013 Summer Universiade (Pool C)	Great Britain	2 – 0	Malaysia	Olymp Stadium
17:00	Aldred 19'; Dyer 49'	Report		Referee: Alexandr Aliyev (Kazakhstan)

===== Knockout stage =====
12 July 2013 Summer Universiade (quarterfinals)	Japan	4 – 0	Malaysia	Trudovye Rezervy Stadium
17:00	Izumisawa 6'; Nakagawa 7'; Nagasawa 81'; Akasaki 83'	Report		Referee: Chang Chih (Chinese Taipei)

14 July 2013 Summer Universiade (5th–8th place)	Republic of Ireland	1 – 1 (a.e.t.) (5–4 p)	Malaysia	Trudovye Rezervy Stadium
17:00	Davidson 64' (pen.)	Report	Saarvindran 70'	Referee: Kulasande Qongqo (South Africa)
	Penalties
	O'Shea (penalty scored); Addis (penalty missed); Omahony (penalty scored); Davidson (penalty scored); Scallan (penalty scored); Andrews (penalty scored)		(penalty scored) Thamil; (penalty scored) Saarvindran; (penalty scored) Fadhli; (penalty scored) Reuben; (penalty missed) Irfan; (penalty missed) Ferris

16 July 2013 Summer Universiade (7th place)	Malaysia	1 – 3	Canada	Trudovye Rezervy Stadium
11:00	Saarvindran 28'	Report	Visintin 40'; Medoruma 49'; Kovacevic 83'	Referee: Vladimir Kazmenko (Russia)

==== 2013 Merdeka Tournament ====
===== Group stage =====
Team	Pld	W	D	L	GF	GA	GD	Pts	Qualification
Malaysia	3	3	0	0	6	1	+5	9	Advanced to the final
Myanmar	3	1	1	1	4	3	+1	4	Advanced to the final
Thailand	3	1	1	1	2	4	−2	4	
Singapore	3	0	0	3	0	4	−4	0	

7 September 2013 Merdeka Tournament (group stage)	Malaysia	1 – 0	Singapore	Darul Makmur Stadium
17:30 UTC+8	Thamil 45'	Report		Referee: Teeitchai Nualjan (Thailand)

9 September 2013 Merdeka Tournament (group stage)	Malaysia	2 – 1	Myanmar	Darul Makmur Stadium
20:45 UTC+8	Irfan 64'; Wan Zack 78'	Report	Nay Lin Tun 37'	Referee: Abdul Malik (Singapore)

11 September 2013 Merdeka Tournament (group stage)	Malaysia	3 – 0	Thailand Selected	Darul Makmur Stadium
20:45 UTC+8	Nasir 11'; Rozaimi 27', 80'	Report		Referee: Malik Bashir (Singapore)

===== Final =====
14 September 2013 Merdeka Tournament (final)	Malaysia	2 – 0	Myanmar	Darul Makmur Stadium
20:45 UTC+8	Rozaimi 28'; Junior 90+3'	Report		Referee: Teeitchai Nualjan (Thailand)

==== Menpora Cup ====
20 September 2013 Menpora Cup (group stage)	Persib Bandung (Indonesia)	2 – 2	Malaysia	Jalak Harupat Soreang Stadium
18:30	Shahrul 27' (o.g.); Ridwan 55' (pen.)	Report	Saarvindran 10'; Ridzuwan 61'

22 September 2013 Menpora Cup (group stage)	Malaysia	0 – 2	(Australia) Central Coast Mariners	Jalak Harupat Soreang Stadium
15:30		Report	Simon 43'; Duke 90'

24 September 2013 Menpora Cup (group stage)	Sriwijaya (Indonesia)	2 – 4	Malaysia	Jalak Harupat Soreang Stadium
15:30	Martha 25'; Tantan 44'	Report	Thamil 12'; Saarvindran 36'; Rozaimi 50', 56'

==== 2013 Southeast Asian Games ====
===== Group stage =====
Team	Pld	W	D	L	GF	GA	GD	Pts
Malaysia	4	3	1	0	9	3	+6	10
Singapore	4	2	2	0	5	2	+3	8
Vietnam	4	2	0	2	13	3	+10	6
Laos	4	1	1	2	5	12	−7	4
Brunei	4	0	0	4	2	14	−12	0

10 December 2013 SEA Games (group stage)	Brunei	0 – 2	Malaysia	Zayyarthiri Stadium
16:00		Report	Rozaimi 31'; Ashri 71'	Referee: Vichhika Tuy (Cambodia)

13 December 2013 SEA Games (group stage)	Malaysia	4 – 1	Laos	Zayyarthiri Stadium
16:00	Hazwan 7', 60', 87'; Ketsada 80' (o.g.)	Report	Soukaphone 41'	Referee: Sgt. Win Cho (Myanmar)

15 December 2013 SEA Games (group stage)	Singapore	1 – 1	Malaysia	Zayyarthiri Stadium
16:00	Afiq 62'	Report	Rozaimi 90+1'	Referee: Wang Zhe (China)

17 December 2013 SEA Games (group stage)	Malaysia	2 – 1	Vietnam	Zayyarthiri Stadium
16:00	Ashri 82'; Saarvindran 90+1'	Report	Mạc Hồng Quân 90+4'	Referee: Wang Zhe (China)

===== Knouckout stage =====
19 December 2013 SEA Games (semi-finals)	Malaysia	1 – 1 (a.e.t.) (3–4 p)	Indonesia	Zayyarthiri Stadium
16:00	Thamil 86'	Report	Bayu 32'	Referee: Ko Hyung-Jin (South Korea)
	Penalties
	Thamil (penalty missed); Shahrul (penalty missed); Nazmi (penalty scored); Fadhli (penalty scored); Rozaimi (penalty scored)		(penalty scored) Alfin; (penalty scored) Diego; (penalty missed) Lestusen; (penalty scored) Yandi; (penalty scored) Pahabol

21 December 2013 SEA Games (third Place)	Malaysia	1 – 2	Singapore	Zayyarthiri Stadium
16:00	Thamil 68'	Report	Hariss 13', 14'	Referee: Sgt. Win Cho (Myanmar)

== League tables ==
=== Super League ===
Pos	Team	Pld	W	D	L	GF	GA	GD	Pts	Qualification or relegation
1	LionsXII (Note: LionsXII was not eligible for any AFC competition spots as they were a foreign side.)	22	12	7	3	32	15	+17	43	
2	Selangor	22	10	10	2	31	17	+14	40	2014 AFC Cup group stage
3	Johor Darul Ta'zim	22	11	7	4	32	26	+6	40	
4	Kelantan	22	10	6	6	32	20	+12	36	2014 AFC Cup group stage (Note: Qualified as 2013 Piala FA winners)
5	Pahang	22	10	5	7	36	32	+4	35	
6	ATM	22	10	4	8	35	25	+10	34	
7	Perak	22	8	5	9	23	27	−4	29	
8	PKNS	22	8	4	10	34	34	0	28	
9	Terengganu	22	7	6	9	25	31	−6	27	
10	T-Team	22	5	4	13	19	33	−14	19	
11	Felda United	22	4	7	11	13	35	−22	19	Relegation to 2014 Liga Premier
12	Negeri Sembilan	22	1	7	14	11	28	−17	10	Relegation to 2014 Liga Premier

Source: RSSSF
Rules for classification: 1) points; 2) goal difference; 3) number of goals scored

=== Premier League ===
Pos	Team	Pld	W	D	L	GF	GA	GD	Pts	Promotion or relegation
1	Sarawak (C, P)	22	18	4	0	49	12	+37	58	Promotion to 2014 Liga Super
2	Sime Darby (P)	22	17	3	2	51	12	+39	54	Promotion to 2014 Liga Super
3	Johor	22	14	3	5	58	23	+35	45	
4	Kedah	22	13	3	6	38	19	+19	42	
5	Sabah	22	9	3	10	42	46	−4	30	
6	Pos Malaysia	22	7	6	9	24	28	−4	27	
7	PDRM	22	7	4	11	41	39	+2	25	
8	SPA	22	6	5	11	29	38	−9	23	
9	UiTM	22	6	5	11	22	35	−13	23	
10	Perlis	22	6	4	12	27	42	−15	22	
11	Kuala Lumpur (R)	22	4	2	16	21	58	−37	14	Relegation to 2014 Malaysia FAM League
12	Betaria (R)	22	2	4	16	13	63	−50	10	Relegation to 2014 Malaysia FAM League

Updated to match(es) played on 5 July 2013. Source: fam.org and Rec.Sport.Soccer Statistics Foundation
Rules for classification: 1) points; 2) goal difference; 3) number of goals scored.
(C) Champions; (P) Promoted; (R) Relegated

=== FAM League ===
Pos	Team	Pld	W	D	L	GF	GA	GD	Pts	Promotion
1	Penang (C, P)	20	17	1	2	53	18	+35	52	Promotion to 2014 Malaysia Premier League
2	PBAPP FC (P)	20	13	2	5	40	15	+25	41	Promotion to 2014 Malaysia Premier League
3	Tentera Darat F.A.	20	12	2	6	50	32	+18	38	Withdrew from FAM League.
4	Harimau Muda C	20	10	5	5	37	25	+12	35	
5	Kuantan FA	20	10	5	5	39	28	+11	35	
6	Malacca FA	20	10	3	7	30	30	0	33	
7	Cebagoo FC	20	4	6	10	20	35	−15	18	
8	Tumpat FA	20	4	4	12	18	35	−17	16	Withdrew from FAM League.
9	Shahzan Muda FC	20	3	6	11	16	32	−16	15	
10	PB Melayu Kedah	20	4	4	12	20	57	−37	16	
11	Perak YBU FC	20	2	4	14	21	37	−16	10	

Updated to match(es) played on 25 June 2013. Source: MFL Official Site
Rules for classification: 1) points; 2) goal difference; 3) number of goals scored.
(C) Champions; (P) Promoted

== Domestic Cups ==
=== FA Cup ===
The final was played on 29 June 2013 at Bukit Jalil National Stadium, Kuala Lumpur.

Saturday, 29 June
20:45 UTC+08:00

Kelantan	1 – 0	Johor Darul Takzim
Nor Farhan 15'	Report

National Stadium, Bukit Jalil, Kuala Lumpur
Attendance: 90,000
Referee: Syed Azhar Syed Kamar (Kuala Lumpur)

=== Malaysia Cup ===
The final was played on 3 Nov 2013 at Shah Alam Stadium, Shah Alam.

3 November 2013
20:45 UTC+8

Kelantan FA	0–1	Pahang FA
		Matías Conti 59'

Shah Alam Stadium, Shah Alam, Selangor
Attendance: 80,119
Referee: Nagor Amir Noor Mohamed (Kuala Lumpur)
