= Football at the 2013 SEA Games =

Football tournament at the 2013 SEA Games
Tournament details
- Host country: Myanmar
- Dates: 7–21 December
- Teams: 11 (from 1 sub-confederation)
- Venue(s): Thuwunna Stadium; Zayarthiri Stadium; Mandalarthiri Stadium

Final positions
- Champions: Thailand (men); Thailand (women)
- Runners-up: Indonesia (men); Vietnam (women)
- Third place: Singapore (men); Myanmar (women)
- Fourth place: Malaysia (men); Malaysia (women)

Tournament statistics
- Matches played: 34
- Goals scored: 109 (3.21 per match)
- Top scorer(s): Six players (men) (Thailand) Anootsara Maijarern (women)

The 27th association football tournament at the 2013 SEA Games took place in Myanmar between 7–21 December. It was played among U-23 (under 23 years old) national teams, while the women's tournament had no age limit.

== Venues ==
Yangon	Naypyidaw	Mandalay
Thuwunna Stadium	Zayarthiri Stadium	Mandalarthiri Stadium
16°49′16.73″N 96°11′12.58″E		
Capacity: 32,000	Capacity: 30,000	Capacity: 30,000

== Men's tournament ==
All matches were played in Thuwunna Stadium, Yangon and Zayarthiri Stadium, Naypyidaw. The official draw for the Southeast Asian Games men's football took place on 10 November 2013 in Naypyidaw, Myanmar.

=== Group stage ===
All times are Myanmar Time – UTC+6:30.

Key to colours in group tables
Group winners and runners-up advanced to the semi-finals

==== Group A ====
On 6 November, Philippines which was originally drawn in Group A, withdrew from the SEA Games.

Team	Pld	W	D	L	GF	GA	GD	Pts
Malaysia	4	3	1	0	9	3	+6	10
Singapore	4	2	2	0	5	2	+3	8
Vietnam	4	2	0	2	13	3	+10	6
Laos	4	1	1	2	5	12	−7	4
Brunei	4	0	0	4	2	14	−12	0

8 December 2013
16:00

Vietnam	7–0	Brunei
Vũ Minh Tuấn 22'; Hà Minh Tuấn 25'; Lê Văn Thắng 44', 53'; Trần Mạnh Dũng 66'; Mạc Hồng Quân 68'; Trần Phi Sơn 82'	Report

Zayarthiri Stadium, Naypyidaw
Referee: Sgt. Win Cho (Myanmar)
8 December 2013
18:45

Singapore	1–1	Laos
Sahil 28'	Report	Sivongthong 86'

Zayarthiri Stadium, Naypyidaw
Referee: Wang Zhe (China)

10 December 2013
16:00

Brunei	0–2	Malaysia
	Report	Rozaimi 31'; Ashri 71'

Zayarthiri Stadium, Naypyidaw
Referee: Vichhika Tuy (Cambodia)
10 December 2013
18:45

Vietnam	0–1	Singapore
	Report	Sahil 45'

Zayarthiri Stadium, Naypyidaw
Referee: Mongkolchai Pechsri (Thailand)

13 December 2013
16:00

Malaysia	4–1	Laos
Hazwan 7', 60', 87'; Souksavanh 80' (o.g.)	Report	Vongchiengkham 41'

Zayarthiri Stadium, Naypyidaw
Referee: Sgt. Win Cho (Myanmar)
13 December 2013
18:45

Brunei	0–2	Singapore
	Report	Hariss 35'; Sahil 58'

Zayarthiri Stadium, Naypyidaw
Referee: Ahmed Shifan (Maldives)

15 December 2013
16:00

Singapore	1–1	Malaysia
Afiq 62'	Report	Rozaimi 90+1'

Zayarthiri Stadium, Naypyidaw
Referee: Wang Zhe (China)
15 December 2013
18:45

Laos	0–5	Vietnam
	Report	Phạm Mạnh Hùng 28'; Nguyễn Văn Quyết 30', 75'; Vũ Minh Tuấn 79'; Mạc Hồng Quân 87'

Zayarthiri Stadium, Naypyidaw
Referee: Vichhika Tuy (Cambodia)

17 December 2013
16:00

Malaysia	2–1	Vietnam
Ashri 82'; Saarvindran 90'	Report	Mạc Hồng Quân 90+5'

Zayarthiri Stadium, Naypyidaw
Referee: Wang Zhe (China)
17 December 2013
18:45

Laos	3–2	Brunei
Souksavanh 37'; Vongchiengkham 45'; Sayyabounsou 51'	Report	Mazazizi 33'; Azwan 83'

Zayarthiri Stadium, Naypyidaw
Referee: Ahmed Shifan (Maldives)

==== Group B ====
Team	Pld	W	D	L	GF	GA	GD	Pts
Thailand	4	2	2	0	8	3	+5	8
Indonesia	4	2	1	1	3	4	−1	7 (Note: Indonesia went through because they won head-to-head against Myanmar, despite Myanmar being equal in points and having a lead in goal for and goal difference.)
Myanmar (H)	4	2	1	1	7	3	+4	7
Timor-Leste	4	1	1	2	5	8	−3	4
Cambodia	4	0	1	3	2	7	−5	1

(H) Hosts
Notes:
7 December 2013
16:00

Timor-Leste	1–3	Thailand
José Carlos 72'	Report	Thitipan 2'; Pokkhao 34'; Artit 48'

Thuwunna Stadium, Yangon
Referee: Suhaizi Shukri (Malaysia)
7 December 2013
18:45

Myanmar	3–0	Cambodia
Zaw Min Tun 18'; Kyaw Ko Ko 36', 47'	Report

Thuwunna Stadium, Yangon
Referee: Ko Hyung-Jin (South Korea)

9 December 2013
16:00

Cambodia	0–1	Indonesia
	Report	Yandi 53'

Thuwunna Stadium, Yangon
Referee: Kao Jung-Fang (Chinese Taipei)
9 December 2013
18:45

Myanmar	3–1	Timor-Leste
Kyaw Zayar Win 13'; Kyaw Ko Ko 71' (pen.); Kyi Lin 77'	Report	Neto 37'

Thuwunna Stadium, Yangon
Referee: Hadimin Shahbudin (Brunei)

12 December 2013
16:00

Indonesia	1–4	Thailand
Andri 90+2'	Report	Pokkhao 2'; Adisak 20'; Pravinwat 52' (pen.); Thitipan 81'

Thuwunna Stadium, Yangon
Referee: Vo Minh Tri (Vietnam)
12 December 2013
18:45

Cambodia	2–3	Timor-Leste
Suhana 23'; Mony Udom 71'	Report	Bertoldo 28'; Henrique 42'; Rangel 87'

Thuwunna Stadium, Yangon
Referee: Suhaizi Shukri (Malaysia)

14 December 2013
16:00

Timor-Leste	0–0	Indonesia
	Report

Thuwunna Stadium, Yangon
Referee: Hadimin Shahbudin (Brunei)
14 December 2013
18:45

Thailand	1–1	Myanmar
Pravinwat 47'	Report	Nay Lin Tun 34'

Thuwunna Stadium, Yangon
Referee: Kao Jung-Fang (Chinese Taipei)

16 December 2013
16:00

Thailand	0–0	Cambodia
	Report

Thuwunna Stadium, Yangon
Referee: Ko Hyung-Jin (South Korea)
16 December 2013
18:45

Indonesia	1–0	Myanmar
Alfin 36' (pen.)	Report

Thuwunna Stadium, Yangon
Referee: Vo Minh Tri (Vietnam)

=== Knockout stage ===
Semi-finals
19 December
Malaysia	1 (3)
Indonesia (p)	1 (4)
19 December
Thailand	1
Singapore	0

Final
21 December
Indonesia	0
Thailand	1
Third place
21 December
Malaysia	1
Singapore	2

==== Semi-finals ====
19 December 2013
16:00

Malaysia	1–1 (a.e.t.)	Indonesia
Thamil 86'	Report	Bayu 32'
Penalties
Thamil (penalty missed); Shahrul (penalty missed); Nazmi (penalty scored); Fadhli (penalty scored); Rozaimi (penalty scored)	3–4	(penalty scored) Alfin; (penalty scored) Michiels; (penalty missed) Manahati; (penalty scored) Yandi; (penalty scored) Pahabol

Zayarthiri Stadium, Naypyidaw
Referee: Ko Hyung-Jin (South Korea)
19 December 2013
19:30

Thailand	1–0	Singapore
Pravinwat 23' (pen.)	Report

Zayarthiri Stadium, Naypyidaw
Referee: Kao Jung-Fang (Chinese Taipei)

==== Bronze medal match ====
21 December 2013
16:00

Malaysia	1–2	Singapore
Thamil 68'	Report	Hariss 13', 14'

Zayarthiri Stadium, Naypyidaw
Referee: Sgt. Win Cho (Myanmar)

==== Gold medal match ====
21 December 2013
19:30

Indonesia	0–1	Thailand
	Report	Sarawut 22'

Zayarthiri Stadium, Naypyidaw
Referee: Wang Zhe (China)

== Final ranking ==
Pos	Team	Pld	W	D	L	GF	GA	GD	Pts	Final result
1	Thailand	6	4	2	0	10	3	+7	14	Gold Medal
2	Indonesia	6	2	2	2	4	6	−2	8	Silver Medal
3	Singapore	6	3	2	1	7	4	+3	11	Bronze Medal
4	Malaysia	6	3	2	1	11	6	+5	11	Fourth place
5	Myanmar (H)	4	2	1	1	7	3	+4	7	Eliminated in group stage
6	Vietnam	4	2	0	2	13	3	+10	6	Eliminated in group stage
7	Timor-Leste	4	1	1	2	5	8	−3	4	Eliminated in group stage
8	Laos	4	1	1	2	5	12	−7	4	Eliminated in group stage
9	Cambodia	4	0	1	3	2	7	−5	1	Eliminated in group stage
10	Brunei	4	0	0	4	2	14	−12	0	Eliminated in group stage

(H) Hosts

== Winners ==
2013 SEA Games Men's Tournament
(Thailand)
Thailand
Fourteenth title

== Goalscorers ==
3 goals

- (Malaysia) Ahmad Hazwan Bakri
- (Myanmar) Kyaw Ko Ko
- (Singapore) Hariss Harun
- (Singapore) Sahil Suhaimi
- (Thailand) Pravinwat Boonyong
- (Vietnam) Mạc Hồng Quân

2 goals

- (Laos) Soukaphone Vongchiengkham
- (Malaysia) Ashri Chuchu
- (Malaysia) Rozaimi Abdul Rahman
- (Malaysia) A. Thamil Arasu
- (Thailand) Pokkhao Anan
- (Thailand) Thitipan Puangchan
- (Vietnam) Lê Văn Thắng
- (Vietnam) Nguyễn Văn Quyết
- (Vietnam) Vũ Minh Tuấn

1 goal

- (Brunei) Mazazizi Mazlan
- (Brunei) Azwan Ali Rahman
- (Cambodia) Prak Mony Udom
- (Cambodia) Sos Suhana
- (Indonesia) Alfin Tuasalamony
- (Indonesia) Andri Ibo
- (Indonesia) Bayu Gatra
- (Indonesia) Yandi Sofyan
- (Laos) Ketsada Souksavanh
- (Laos) Khouanta Sivongthong
- (Laos) Vilayuth Sayyabounsou
- (Malaysia) D. Saarvindran
- (Myanmar) Kyaw Zayar Win
- (Myanmar) Kyi Lin
- (Myanmar) Nay Lin Tun
- (Myanmar) Zaw Min Tun
- (Singapore) Afiq Yunos
- (Thailand) Adisak Kraisorn
- (Thailand) Artit Daosawang
- (Thailand) Sarawut Masuk
- (Timor-Leste) Diogo Rangel
- (Timor-Leste) Fellipe Bertoldo
- (Timor-Leste) Jairo Neto
- (Timor-Leste) José Carlos da Fonseca
- (Timor-Leste) Pedro Henrique
- (Vietnam) Hà Minh Tuấn
- (Vietnam) Phạm Mạnh Hùng
- (Vietnam) Trần Mạnh Dũng
- (Vietnam) Trần Phi Sơn

1 own goal

- (Laos) Ketsada Souksavanh (playing against Malaysia)

== Women's tournament ==
All match will be played in Mandalarthiri Stadium, Mandalay. Official drawing for the Southeast Asian Games women's football took place on 6 November 2013 in Naypyitaw, Myanmar.

=== Group stage ===
All times are Myanmar Time – UTC+6:30.

Key to colours in group tables
Group winners and runners-up advanced to the semi-finals

==== Group A ====
On 8 December, Indonesia which was originally drawn in Group A, withdrew from the SEA Games women's football competition.

Team	Pld	W	D	L	GF	GA	GD	Pts
Vietnam	2	2	0	0	8	0	+8	6
Myanmar (H)	2	1	0	1	2	1	+1	3
Philippines	2	0	0	2	0	9	−9	0

(H) Hosts
10 December 2013
16:00

Myanmar	2–0	Philippines
Khin Marlar Tun 29'; Than Than Htwe 60'	Report

Mandalarthiri Stadium, Mandalay
Referee: Rita Gani (Malaysia)

13 December 2013
16:00

Philippines	0–7	Vietnam
	Report	Nguyễn Thị Muôn 8', 61'; Nguyễn Thị Minh Nguyệt 10', 70'; Trần Thị Kim Hồng 60'; Nguyễn Thị Tuyết Dung 73'; Huỳnh Như 83'

Mandalarthiri Stadium, Mandalay
Referee: Maria Piedade Rebello (India)

15 December 2013
16:00

Vietnam	1–0	Myanmar
Lê Thu Thanh Hương 18'	Report

Mandalarthiri Stadium, Mandalay
Referee: Kim Sook-He (South Korea)

==== Group B ====
On 22 November, Timor-Leste which was originally drawn in Group B, withdrew from the SEA Games women's football competition.

Team	Pld	W	D	L	GF	GA	GD	Pts
Thailand	2	2	0	0	11	1	+10	6
Malaysia	2	1	0	1	4	7	−3	3
Laos	2	0	0	2	1	8	−7	0

12 December 2013
16:00

Laos	1–3	Malaysia
Noum 74'	Report	Angela 2', 9'; Sihaya 68'

Mandalarthiri Stadium, Mandalay
Referee: Mai Hoang Trang (Vietnam)

14 December 2013
16:00

Malaysia	1–6	Thailand
Sihaya 78'	Report	Anootsara 16', 45'; Ainon 52'; Darut 58'; Kwanreuthai 88', 90+2'

Mandalarthiri Stadium, Mandalay
Referee: He Jin (China)

16 December 2013
16:00

Thailand	5–0	Laos
Anootsara 12', 44', 61'; Ainon 26'; Taneekarn 81'	Report

Mandalarthiri Stadium, Mandalay
Referee: Seinn Cho Aung (Myanmar)

=== Knockout stage ===
Semi-finals
18 December
Vietnam	4
Malaysia	0
18 December
Thailand (pen.)	2 (9)
Myanmar	2 (8)

Final
20 December
Vietnam	1
Thailand	2
Third place
20 December
Malaysia	0
Myanmar	6

==== Semi-finals ====
18 December 2013
16:00

Vietnam	4–0	Malaysia
Nguyễn Thị Minh Nguyệt 11', 64'; Nguyễn Thị Tuyết Dung 55'; Huỳnh Như 77'	Report

Mandalarthiri Stadium, Mandalay
Referee: He Jin (China)
18 December 2013
19:30

Thailand	2–2 (a.e.t.)	Myanmar
Kanjana 20'; Kwanruethai 104'	Report	Yee Yee Oo 90+2', 116'
Penalties
Darut (penalty scored); Kanjana (penalty scored); Khwanrudi (penalty scored); Kwanruethai (penalty scored); Nisa (penalty missed); Supaporn (penalty scored); Ainon (penalty scored); Duangnapa (penalty scored); Natthakarn (penalty scored); Naphat (penalty scored)	9–8	(penalty scored) Myint Myint Aye; (penalty scored) Phu Pwint Khine; (penalty scored) Yee Yee Oo; (penalty scored) Than Than Htwe; (penalty missed) San San Maw; (penalty scored) Moe Moe War; (penalty scored) Khin Marlar Tun; (penalty scored) Khin Than Wai; (penalty scored) Margret Marri; (penalty missed) Zin Mar Win

Mandalarthiri Stadium, Mandalay
Referee: Maria Piedade Rebello (India)

==== Bronze medal match ====
20 December 2013
16:00

Malaysia	0–6	Myanmar
	Report	Yee Yee Oo 25', 70'; Khin Moe Wai 39'; Than Than Htwe 40'; San San Maw 83'; Myint Myint Aye 90+3'

Mandalarthiri Stadium, Mandalay
Referee: Pannipar Kamnueng (Thailand)

==== Gold medal match ====
20 December 2013
19:30

Vietnam	1–2	Thailand
Nguyễn Thị Minh Nguyệt 33'	Report	Naphat 40'; Anootsara 47'

Mandalarthiri Stadium, Mandalay
Referee: Kim Sook-He (South Korea)

== Winners ==
2013 SEA Games Women's Tournament

Thailand
Fifth title

== Goalscorers ==
6 goals

- (Thailand) Anootsara Maijarern

5 goals

- (Vietnam) Nguyễn Thị Minh Nguyệt

4 goals

- (Myanmar) Yee Yee Oo

3 goals

- (Thailand) Kwanruethai Kunupatham

2 goals

- (Malaysia) Angela Kais
- (Malaysia) Sihaya Ajad
- (Myanmar) Than Than Htwe
- (Thailand) Ainon Phancha
- (Vietnam) Huỳnh Như
- (Vietnam) Nguyễn Thị Muôn
- (Vietnam) Nguyễn Thị Tuyết Dung

1 goal

- (Laos) Noum Angmansongsa
- (Myanmar) Khin Marlar Tun
- (Myanmar) Khin Moe Wai
- (Myanmar) Myint Myint Aye
- (Myanmar) San San Maw
- (Thailand) Darut Changplook
- (Thailand) Kanjana Sungngoen
- (Thailand) Naphat Seesraum
- (Thailand) Taneekarn Dangda
- (Vietnam) Lê Thu Thanh Hương
- (Vietnam) Trần Thị Kim Hồng

== Final standing ==
Pos	Team	Pld	W	D	L	GF	GA	GD	Pts	Final result
1	Thailand	4	3	1	0	15	4	+11	10	Gold Medal
2	Vietnam	4	3	0	1	13	2	+11	9	Silver Medal
3	Myanmar (H)	4	2	1	1	10	3	+7	7	Bronze Medal
4	Malaysia	4	1	0	3	4	17	−13	3	Fourth place
5	Laos	2	0	0	2	1	8	−7	0	Eliminated in group stage
6	Philippines	2	0	0	2	0	9	−9	0	Eliminated in group stage

(H) Hosts

== Medal winners ==
Event	Gold	Silver	Bronze
Men's Division	Thailand; Peerapat Notechaiya; Theeraton Bunmathan; Sakolwat Skollah; Thitipan Puangchan; Artit Daosawang; Adisak Kraisorn; Pokkhao Anan; Charyl Chappuis; Narubodin Weerawatnodom; Pakorn Prempak; Pravinwat Boonyong; Chutipol Thongthae; Chanathip Songkrasin; Chananan Pombuppha; Chanin Sae-Eae; Tanaboon Kesarat; Kawin Thammasatchanan; Ukrit Wongmeema; Krirkrit Thaweekarn; Sarawut Masuk	Indonesia; Kurnia Meiga; Syahrizal Syahbuddin; Dendi Santoso; Rizky Pellu; Ramdhani Lestaluhu; Egi Melgiansyah; Yandi Munawar; Dedi Kusnandar; Andritany Ardhiyasa; Manahati Lestusen; Yohanes Pahabol; Rony Beroperay; Andik Vermansyah; Fandi Utomo; Bayu Gatra; Diego Muhammad; Alfin Ismail Tuasalamony; Nelson Alom; Andri Ibo; Mokhamad Syaifuddin	Singapore; Izwan Mahbud; Sahil Suhaimi; Afiq Yunos; Anumanthan Kumar; Madhu Mohana; Gabriel Quak; Hafiz Abu Sujad; Faritz Hameed; Faris Ramli; Hariss Harun; Zulfahmi Arifin; Khairulhin Khalid; Izzdin Shafiq; Safuwan Baharudin; Nazrul Nazari; Shahfiq Ghani; Iqbal Hussain; Al-Qaasimy Rahman; Syazwan Buhari
Women's Division	Thailand; Waraporn Boonsing; Darut Changplook; Natthakarn Chinwong; Duangnapa Sritala; Kwanruethai Kunupatham; Pikul Khueanpet; Naphat Seesraum; Warunee Phetwiset; Sunisa Srangthaisong; Ainon Phancha; Khwanrudi Saengchan; Anootsara Maijarern; Taneekarn Dangda; Wilaiporn Boothduang; Kanjana Sungngoen; Sukanya Chor Charoenying; Nisa Romyen; Rattikan Thongsombut; Alisa Rukpinij; Supaporn Gaewbaen	Vietnam; Đặng Thị Kiều Trinh; Nguyễn Thị Xuyến; Chương Thị Kiều; Bùi Thị Như; Nguyễn Thị Nga; Phạm Hoàng Quỳnh; Nguyễn Thị Tuyết Dung; Nguyễn Thị Minh Nguyệt; Huỳnh Như; Nguyễn Thị Hòa; Nguyễn Thị Nguyệt; Vũ Thị Nhung; Nguyễn Thị Muôn; Lê Thị Tuyết Mai; Nguyễn Thị Ngọc Anh; Lê Thị Thương; Nguyễn Hải Hòa; Nguyễn Thị Liễu; Lê Thu Thanh Hương; Trần Thị Kim Hồng	Myanmar; May Khin Ya Min; Myint Myint Aye; Shwe Zin Aung; Moe Moe War; Phu Pwint Khine; San San Maw; Than Than Htwe; Nilar Myint; Yee Yee Oo; Khin Marlar Tun; Khin Moe Wai; Naw Arlo Wer Phaw; Margret Marri; Wai Wai Aung; Zin Mar Win; Khin Than Wai; Thidar Oo; Win Theingi Tun; Zar Chi Oo; Mya Phu Ngon

Preceded by 2011	Football at the SEA Games; 2013 SEA Games	Succeeded by 2015
