= Football at the 2013 Summer Universiade – Men's tournament =

Men's football at the XXVII Summer Universiade
- Venue: Various
- Dates: July 5–16, 2013

Medalists
1st place, gold medalist(s)		France (FRA)
2nd place, silver medalist(s)		Great Britain (GBR)
3rd place, bronze medalist(s)		Japan (JPN)

The men's tournament of football at the 2013 Summer Universiade was held from July 5 to 16 in Kazan, Russia.

== Teams ==
Africa	Americas	Asia	Europe
~~Algeria~~ (withdrew)	Brazil; Canada; Mexico; Peru; Uruguay	China; Japan; Malaysia	France; Great Britain; Italy; Republic of Ireland; Russia; Turkey; Ukraine

== Preliminary round ==
=== Pool A ===
Team	Pld	W	D	L	GF	GA	GD	Pts
Russia	3	2	0	1	5	2	+3	6
Republic of Ireland	3	1	1	1	4	4	0	4
Mexico	3	1	1	1	1	2	−1	4
China	3	0	2	1	2	4	−2	2

5 July 2013
20:00

Russia	1–2	Republic of Ireland
Dyadyun 16'	Report	Davidson 12'; Forsyth 81' (pen.)

Rubin Stadium
Referee: Antonio Damato (Italy)
5 July 2013
20:00

China	0–0	Mexico
	Report

Trudovye Rezervy Stadium
Referee: Sergiu Derenov (Moldova)

8 July 2013
20:00

Russia	2–0	Mexico
Nikitin 55'; Ustinov 69'	Report

Rubin Stadium
Referee: Kulasande Qongqo (South Africa)
8 July 2013
20:00

China	2–2	Republic of Ireland
Han Guanghui 45+2'; Cui Boyu 89'	Report	Addis 2'; Mulligan 44'

Trudovye Rezervy Stadium
Referee: Silviu-Ionel Petrescu (Canada)

10 July 2013
20:00

Russia	2–0	China
Dyadyun 66'; Bezlikhotnov 90+3'	Report

Rubin Stadium
Referee: Diego Haro (Peru)
10 July 2013
20:00

Mexico	1–0	Republic of Ireland
Alvarado 37'	Report

Trudovye Rezervy Stadium
Referee: Yudai Yamamoto (Japan)

=== Pool B ===
Team	Pld	W	D	L	GF	GA	GD	Pts
Japan	3	3	0	0	9	1	+8	9
Ukraine	3	1	1	1	6	7	−1	4
Uruguay	3	0	2	1	3	4	−1	2
Turkey	3	0	1	2	2	8	−6	1

5 July 2013
14:00

Japan	4–0	Turkey
Nagasawa 12' (pen.); Chajima 72'; Akasaki 79'; Shimoda 83'	Report

Rubin Stadium
Referee: Kulasande Qongqo (South Africa)
5 July 2013
14:00

Uruguay	2–2	Ukraine
Pirotto 15'; Dávila 87'	Report	Kurylo 25'; Kravchenko 27'

Trudovye Rezervy Stadium
Referee: Silviu-Ionel Petrescu (Romania)

8 July 2013
17:00

Japan	4–1	Ukraine
Akasaki 50', 80'; Kuruyama 63'; Matsumoto 75'	Report	Klimentovskyi 29'

Rubin Stadium
Referee: Diego Haro (Peru)
8 July 2013
17:00

Uruguay	1–1	Turkey
Dávila 46'	Report	Sen 17'

Trudovye Rezervy Stadium
Referee: Tan Hai (China PR)

10 July 2013
17:00

Japan	1–0	Uruguay
Chajima 72'	Report

Rubin Stadium
Referee: Vladimir Kazmenko (Russia)
10 July 2013
17:00

Ukraine	3–1	Turkey
Halenko 50'; Kravchenko 59'; Kifa 90+4'	Report	Cakir 61'

Trudovye Rezervy Stadium
Referee: Alexandr Aliyev (Kazakhstan)

=== Pool C ===
Team	Pld	W	D	L	GF	GA	GD	Pts
Great Britain	2	1	0	1	2	1	+1	3
Malaysia	2	1	0	1	2	2	0	3
Italy	2	1	0	1	1	2	−1	3

5 July 2013
20:00

Italy	0–2	Malaysia
	Report	Thamil 21'; Saarvindran 87' (pen.)

Raketa Stadium
Referee: Jorge Rojas (Mexico)

8 July 2013
17:00

Great Britain	2–0	Malaysia
Aldred 19'; Dyer 49'	Report

Olymp Stadium
Referee: Alexandr Aliyev (Kazakhstan)

10 July 2013
17:00

Great Britain	0–1	Italy
	Report	Masi 68'

Olymp Stadium
Referee: Oleksandr Derdo (Ukraine)

=== Pool D ===
Team	Pld	W	D	L	GF	GA	GD	Pts
France	3	1	2	0	5	2	+3	5
Canada	3	1	2	0	5	3	+2	5
Brazil	3	1	2	0	2	1	+1	5
Peru	3	0	0	3	0	6	−6	0

5 July 2013
14:00

Brazil	1–0	Peru
Berger 68'	Report

Olymp Stadium
Referee: Vladimir Kazmenko (Russia)
5 July 2013
14:00

Canada	2–2	France
Bams 26'; Murphy 77' (pen.)	Report	Villa 11', 25'

Raketa Stadium
Referee: Yudai Yamamoto (Japan)

8 July 2013
20:00

Brazil	0–0	France
	Report

Olymp Stadium
Referee: Chang Chih (Chinese Taipei)
8 July 2013
20:00

Canada	2–0	Peru
Clerc 31'; Kovacevic 64'	Report

Raketa Stadium
Referee: Oleksandr Derdo (Ukraine)

10 July 2013
20:00

Brazil	1–1	Canada
Berger 38'	Report	Murphy 59' (pen.)

Olymp Stadium
Referee: Antonio Damato (Italy)
10 July 2013
20:00

France	3–0	Peru
Bacle 14'; Bezecourt 78', 89'	Report

Raketa Stadium
Referee: Jorge Rojas (Mexico)

== Classification rounds ==
Quarterfinals
A3	Mexico (p)	3 (3)
D4	Peru	3 (0)
C3	Italy	4
B4	Turkey	0
B3	Uruguay	w/o
D3	Brazil	1
A4	China	4

Semifinals
A3	Mexico (p)	1 (4)
C3	Italy	1 (2)
B3	Uruguay (p)	2 (6)
A4	China	2 (5)

Gold-medal match
A3	Mexico	3
B3	Uruguay	1

=== Quarterfinal round ===
==== 9th–16th place ====
12 July 2013
17:00

Italy	4–0	Turkey
Muratori 42'; Degeri 48'; Ricci 67'; Parodi 89'	Report

Olymp Stadium
Referee: Sergiu Derenov (Moldova)
12 July 2013
17:00

Mexico	3–3	Peru
Loya 11'; Alvarado 43', 45+1'	Report	Bazalar 64' (pen.), 74'; Loyola 82'
Penalties
Madrigal (penalty scored); Gutiérrez (penalty scored); Ledezma (penalty scored)	3–0	(penalty missed) Ríos; (penalty missed) Farfán; (penalty missed) Loyola

Raketa Stadium
Referee: Tan Hai (China PR)
12 July 2013
20:00

Brazil	1–4	China
Franci 4'	Report	Li Xun 35', 82'; Hu Ming 49'; Han Guanghu 84'

Raketa Stadium
Referee: Eiko Saar (Estonia)

=== Semifinal round ===
==== 13th–16th place ====
14 July 2013
17:00

Turkey	2–1	Peru
Alaeddinoglu 4'; Turk 78'	Report	Arenas 83'

Olymp Stadium
Referee: Yudai Yamamoto (Japan)

==== 9th–12th place ====
14 July 2013
17:00

Italy	1–1	Mexico
Santini 58' (pen.)	Report	Vázquez 78'
Penalties
Parodi (penalty missed); Muratori (penalty scored); Burato (penalty scored); Carta (penalty missed)	2–4	(penalty scored) Ledezma; (penalty scored) Méndez; (penalty scored) Vázquez; (penalty scored) Gutiérrez

Raketa Stadium
Referee: Mohd Amirul Izwan Bin Yaacob (Malaysia)
14 July 2013
20:00

Uruguay	2–2	China
Pirotto 87'; Carlevaro 90'	Report	Hu Ming 37', 75'
Penalties
Guerrero (penalty scored); Pirotto (penalty scored); Púa (penalty scored); Vidal (penalty scored); Fernández (penalty scored); Finocchietti (penalty scored)	6–5	(penalty scored) Li Xun; (penalty scored) Han Guanghui; (penalty scored) Guo Ziyin; (penalty scored) Qian Changjie; (penalty scored) Lu Bin; (penalty missed) Hu Ming

Raketa Stadium
Referee: Alexandr Aliyev (Kazakhstan)

== Elimination round ==
Quarterfinals
D1	France (p)	0 (4)
A2	Republic of Ireland	0 (3)
B1	Japan	4
C2	Malaysia	0
A1	Russia	4
D2	Canada	1
C1	Great Britain	1
B2	Ukraine	0

Semifinals
D1	France (p)	1 (3)
B1	Japan	1 (1)
A1	Russia	1 (3)
C1	Great Britain (p)	1 (5)

Gold-medal match
D1	France (aet)	3
C1	Great Britain	2
Bronze-medal match
B1	Japan	3
A1	Russia	0

=== Quarterfinals ===
12 July 2013
17:00

France	0–0	Republic of Ireland
	Report
Penalties
Gazagnes (penalty scored); Barsotti (penalty scored); Merhouni (penalty scored); Bacle (penalty missed); Sanson (penalty scored)	4–3	(penalty missed) Forsyth; (penalty scored) Addis; (penalty missed) Malone; (penalty scored) Davidson; (penalty scored) O'Shea

Rubin Stadium
Referee: Oleksandr Derdo (Ukraine)
12 July 2013
17:00

Japan	4–0	Malaysia
Izumisawa 6'; Nakagawa 7'; Nagasawa 81'; Akasaki 83'	Report

Trudovye Rezervy Stadium
Referee: Chang Chih (Chinese Taipei)
12 July 2013
20:00

Russia	4–1	Canada
Dyadyun 9', 28'; Nikiforov 90+1'; Bocharov 90+2'	Report	Murphy 45+2' (pen.)

Rubin Stadium
Referee: Jorge Rojas (Mexico)
12 July 2013
20:00

Great Britain	1–0	Ukraine
Malin 1' (pen.)	Report

Trudovye Rezervy Stadium
Referee: Antonio Damato (Italy)

=== Semifinals ===
==== 5th–8th place ====
14 July 2013
17:00

Republic of Ireland	1–1	Malaysia
Davidson 64' (pen.)	Report	Saarvindran 70'
Penalties
O'Shea (penalty scored); Addis (penalty missed); Omahony (penalty scored); Davidson (penalty scored); Scallan (penalty scored); Andrews (penalty scored)	5–4	(penalty scored) Thamil; (penalty scored) Saarvindran; (penalty scored) Fadhli; (penalty scored) Reuben; (penalty missed) Irfan; (penalty missed) Ferris

Trudovye Rezervy Stadium
Referee: Kulasande Qongqo (South Africa)
14 July 2013
20:00

Canada	0–1	Ukraine
	Report	Kravchenko 66'

Trudovye Rezervy Stadium
Referee: Tan Hai (China PR)

==== 1st–4th place ====
14 July 2013
17:00

France	1–1	Japan
Villa 45+1'	Report	Akasaki 67'
Penalties
Gazagnes (penalty scored); Barsotti (penalty scored); Vasseur (penalty scored)	3–1	(penalty missed) Nagasawa; (penalty scored) Futami; (penalty missed) Chajima; (penalty missed) Matsumoto

Rubin Stadium
Referee: Silviu-Ionel Petrescu (Romania)
14 July 2013
20:00

Russia	1–1	Great Britain
Dyadyun 68'	Report	Rae 80'
Penalties
Dyadyun (penalty missed); Bezlikhotnov (penalty scored); Nikitin (penalty scored); Golubev (penalty scored)	3–5	(penalty scored) Platt; (penalty scored) Dyer; (penalty scored) Winter; (penalty scored) Richman; (penalty scored) Moses

Rubin Stadium
Referee: Diego Haro (Peru)

== Final round ==
=== 13th-place game ===
16 July 2013
14:00

Turkey	4–2	Brazil
Yıldırım 13'; Çakır 24'; Alaeddinnoğlu 44'; Osmanoğlu 89'	Report	Berger 16' (pen.); Paixão 46'

Olymp Stadium
Referee: Tan Hai (China)

=== 11th-place game ===
16 July 2013
11:00

Italy	2–1	China
Santini 24', 36'	Report	Hu Ming 11'

Raketa Stadium
Referee: Silviu-Ionel Petrescu (Canada)

=== 9th-place game ===
16 July 2013
14:00

Mexico	3–1	Uruguay
Méndez 44'; Vázquez 45+1'; Gutiérrez 72'	Report	Dávila 5'

Raketa Stadium
Referee: Sergiu Derenov (Moldova)

=== 7th-place game ===
16 July 2013
11:00

Malaysia	1–3	Canada
Saarvindran 28'	Report	Visintin 40'; Medoruma 49'; Kovacevic 83'

Trudovye Rezervy Stadium
Referee: Vladimir Kazmenko (Russia)

=== 5th-place game ===
16 July 2013
14:00

Republic of Ireland	3–1	Ukraine
Mernagh 17'; Addis 76'; Omahony 83' (pen.)	Report	Kravchenko 88'

Trudovye Rezervy Stadium
Referee: Diego Haro (Peru)

=== Bronze-medal match ===
16 July 2013
16:00

Japan	3–0	Russia
Ogawa 17'; Akasaki 82', 89'	Report

Rubin Stadium
Referee: Jorge Rojas (Mexico)

=== Gold-medal match ===
16 July 2013
20:00

France	3–2 (a.e.t.)	Great Britain
Sotoca 18'; Winter 51' (o.g.); Weyders 113'	Report	Rae 68', 90+3'

Rubin Stadium
Referee: Antonio Damato (Italy)

== Final standings ==
Place	Team	Score
1st place, gold medalist(s)	France	4–2–0
2nd place, silver medalist(s)	Great Britain	3–0–2
3rd place, bronze medalist(s)	Japan	5–0–1
4	Russia	3–0–3
5	Republic of Ireland	3–1–2
6	Ukraine	2–1–3
7	Canada	2–2–2
8	Malaysia	1–0–4
9	Mexico	4–1–1
10	Uruguay	1–2–2
11	Italy	3–0–2
12	China	1–2–3
13	Turkey	2–1–3
14	Brazil	1–2–2
15	Peru	0–0–5
