= Praweenwat Boonyong =

Thai footballer

Personal information
- Full name: Praweenwat Boonyong
- Date of birth: 13 February 1990 (age 36)
- Place of birth: Kanchanaburi, Thailand
- Height: 1.79 m (5 ft 10 1/2 in)
- Positions: Centre-back; defensive midfielder

Team information
- Current team: Kanchanaburi Power U21 (head coach)

Youth career
- 2005–2007: Assumption College Thonburi
- 2008–2010: Bangkok Glass

Senior career*
Years	Team	Apps	(Gls)
2011–2018	Bangkok Glass	69	(8)
2013	→ Chainat Hornbill (loan)	0	(0)
2017	→ Port (loan)	3	(0)
2018	→ Buriram United (loan)	13	(0)
2018–2021	Ratchaburi Mitr Phol	42	(1)
2022	PT Prachuap	8	(1)
2022–2023	Nakhon Si United	7	(1)
2023–2024	Customs United	6	(0)
Total		148	(11)

International career
2013	Thailand U23	6	(4)
2014–2018	Thailand	8	(0)

Managerial career
- 2025–: Kanchanaburi Power U21
- 2025: Kanchanaburi Power (assistant)
Medal record
Thailand under-23
Sea Games
Gold medal – first place	Sea Games 2013	Football
Thailand
Asean Football Championship
Winner	AFF Suzuki Cup 2014	2014
Winner	AFF Suzuki Cup 2016	2016
- * Club domestic league appearances and goals

Praweenwat Boonyong (Thai: ประวีณวัช บุญยงค์, born 13 February 1990), simply known as Big (Thai: บิ๊ก), is a Thai professional football coach and former player, who is the head coach of Kanchanaburi Power U21.

== International career ==
He represented Thailand U-23 in the 2013 Southeast Asian Games. Praweenwat is part of Thailand's squad in the 2014 AFF Suzuki Cup. In May 2015, he was called up by Thailand to play in the 2018 FIFA World Cup qualification (AFC) against Vietnam.

=== International ===
Appearances and goals by national team and year
National team	Year	Apps	Goals
Thailand	2014	4	0
Thailand	2015	2	0
Thailand	2016	2	0
Thailand	Total	8	0

=== International goals ===
==== Under-23 ====
#	Date	Venue	Opponent	Score	Result	Competition
1.	November 22, 2013	United Stadium, Thailand	Brunei	4–0	2–0	Friendly match
2.	December 12, 2013	Thuwunna Stadium, Myanmar	Indonesia	3–0 (pen.)	4–1	2013 Southeast Asian Games
3.	December 14, 2013	Thuwunna Stadium, Myanmar	Myanmar	1–1	1–1	2013 Southeast Asian Games
4.	December 19, 2013	Zayarthiri Stadium, Myanmar	Singapore	1–0	1–0	2013 Southeast Asian Games

== Honours ==
=== Club ===
Bangkok Glass

- Thai FA Cup: 2014

=== International ===
Thailand U-23

- Sea Games Gold Medal: 2013

Thailand

- ASEAN Football Championship: 2014, 2016

=== Individual ===
- Sea Games top scorer: 2013
