= 2013 Merdeka Tournament =

International football competition

Pesta Bola Merdeka

Tournament details
- Host country: Malaysia
- Dates: 4–15 September
- Teams: 4
- Venues: 2 (in 2 host cities)

Final positions
- Champions: Malaysia (2nd title)
- Runners-up: Myanmar
- Third place: Singapore
- Fourth place: Thailand

Tournament statistics
- Matches played: 8
- Goals scored: 17 (2.13 per match)
- Top scorer(s): (Malaysia) Rozaimi Abdul Rahman (3 goals)
- Best player: (Malaysia) Wan Zack Haikal

The 41st Merdeka Tournament were played from 4 to 15 September 2013. Malaysia Under-23 team earned a huge boost ahead of December’s Sea Games when they edged Myanmar 2–0 in the final. It was Malaysia’s 12th title in Asia’s oldest tournament (overall until this year edition), with the second title specifically for the Under-23 side, since its inception in 1957.

== Teams ==
The participating teams are mostly Under-23 squads preparing for the 2013 SEA Games. Jordan have withdrawn from Merdeka Tournament in Kuantan and the FA of Malaysia has invited Myanmar as the replacements.

- Malaysia
- Myanmar
- Singapore
- Thailand

== Stadiums ==
City	Stadium	Capacity
Kuantan	Darul Makmur Stadium	35,000
Temerloh	Temerloh Mini Stadium	3,000

== Tournament ==
=== Group stage ===
- Times listed are UTC+8.

Team	Pld	W	D	L	GF	GA	GD	Pts	Qualification
Malaysia	3	3	0	0	6	1	+5	9	Advanced to the final
Myanmar	3	1	1	1	4	3	+1	4	Advanced to the final
Thailand	3	1	1	1	2	4	−2	4	
Singapore	3	0	0	3	0	4	−4	0	

7 September 2013
17:30

Malaysia	1–0	Singapore
Thamil Arasu 46'	Report

Darul Makmur Stadium, Kuantan
Referee: Teetichai Nualjan (Thailand)
7 September 2013
20:45

Thailand	1–1	Myanmar
Chayawat 7'	Report	Kyaw Zayar Win 11'

Darul Makmur Stadium, Kuantan
Referee: Mohd Nafreez Abd Wahab (Malaysia)

9 September 2013
17:30

Thailand	1–0	Singapore
Pakorn 34'	Report

Darul Makmur Stadium, Kuantan
Referee: U Win Htut (Myanmar)
9 September 2013
20:45

Malaysia	2–1	Myanmar
Irfan 64'; Wan Zack 78'	Report	Nay Lin Tun 38'

Darul Makmur Stadium, Kuantan
Referee: Malik Bashir (Singapore)

11 September 2013
20:45

Malaysia	3–0	Thailand
Nasir 11'; Rozaimi 27', 80'	Report

Darul Makmur Stadium, Kuantan
Referee: Malik Bashir (Singapore)
11 September 2013
20:45

Singapore	0–2	Myanmar
	Report	Kyaw Ko Ko 15'; Soe Kyaw Kyaw 89'

Temerloh Mini Stadium, Temerloh
Referee: Mohd Nafreez Abd Wahab (Malaysia)

=== 3rd/4th Place ===
14 September 2013
17:30

Thailand	1–2	Singapore
Hasan Maeroh 82'	Report	Shahfiq 45+1'; Faris 90+2'

Darul Makmur Stadium, Kuantan
Referee: Mohd Nafreez Abd Wahab (Malaysia)

=== Final ===
14 September 2013
20:45

Malaysia	2–0	Myanmar
Rozaimi 28'; Eldstål 90+3'	Report

Darul Makmur Stadium, Kuantan
Referee: Teetichai Nualjan (Thailand)

== Winners ==
2013 Merdeka Tournament Winner
(Malaysia)
Malaysia
2nd title

Most Valuable Player	Golden Boot
(Malaysia) Wan Zack Haikal	(Malaysia) Rozaimi Abdul Rahman

== Goalscorers ==
3 goals

- (Malaysia) Rozaimi Rahman

1 goal

- (Malaysia) Junior Eldstål
- (Malaysia) Irfan Fazail
- (Malaysia) Nasir Basharudin
- (Malaysia) Thamil Arasu Ambumamee
- (Malaysia) Wan Zack Haikal
- (Myanmar) Kyaw Ko Ko
- (Myanmar) Kyaw Zayar Win
- (Myanmar) Nay Lin Tun
- (Myanmar) Soe Kyaw Kyaw
- (Singapore) Faris Ramli
- (Singapore) Shahfiq Ghani
- (Thailand) Chayawat Srinawong
- (Thailand) Hasan Maeroh
- (Thailand) Pakorn Prempak

== Team statistics ==
This table shows all team performance.

Pos	Team	Pld	W	D	L	GF	GA	GD
1	Malaysia	4	4	0	0	8	1	+7
2	Myanmar	4	1	1	2	4	5	−1
3	Singapore	4	1	0	3	2	5	−3
4	Thailand	4	1	1	2	3	6	−3
