= Darut Changplook =

Thai footballer (born 1988)

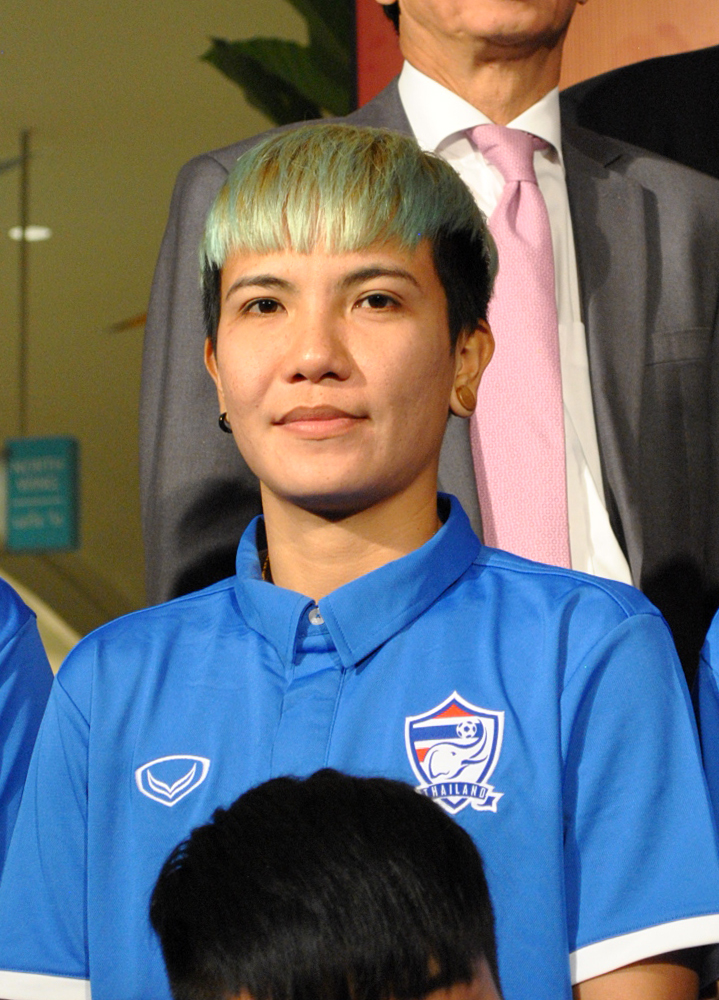

Personal information
- Full name: Darut Changplook
- Date of birth: 3 February 1988 (age 38)
- Place of birth: Nakhon Ratchasima, Thailand
- Height: 1.71 m (5 ft 7 in)
- Position: Defender

International career^{‡}
| Years | Team | Apps | (Gls) |
| 2010–2015 | Thailand | 22 | (1) |
- ‡ National team caps and goals as of 22:17, 17 June 2015 (UTC)

Darut Changplook (Thai: ดารัตน์ ช่างปลูก born 3 February 1988) is a Thai international footballer who plays as a defender. Changplook is a veteran player who is cool under pressure and is known for her strong play on the back-line of defense as well as her signature blue-dyed hair.

== International goals ==
| No. | Date | Venue | Opponent | Score | Result | Competition |
|---|---|---|---|---|---|---|
| 1. | 7 December 2006 | Grand Hamad Stadium, Doha, Qatar | Jordan | 1–0 | 5–0 | 2006 Asian Games |
| 2. | 14 December 2013 | Mandalarthiri Stadium, Mandalay, Myanmar | Malaysia | 4–0 | 6–1 | 2013 Southeast Asian Games |
