= Kao Jung-fang =

Taiwanese football referee

Kao Jung-Fang
- Full name: Kao Jung-Fang
- Born: 30 October 1980 (age 45); Taiwan

International
Years	League	Role
2009–	AFC	Referee

Kao Jung-Fang (Chinese: 高榮芳; born 30 October 1980) is a Taiwanese football referee who has been a full international referee for FIFA.

He also refereed at the regional league such as 2011 SEA Games.,2013 SEA Games.
