= Ashri Chuchu =

Malaysian footballer

Personal information
- Full name: Ashri bin Chuchu
- Date of birth: 27 February 1991 (age 35)
- Place of birth: Sarawak, Malaysia
- Height: 1.66 m (5 ft 5 1/2 in)
- Positions: Winger; attacking midfielder

Team information
- Current team: Sarawak United
- Number: 11

Youth career
- Tabuan Jaya Sport School

Senior career*
Years	Team	Apps	(Gls)
2009–2016	Sarawak		
2017–2019	Kuala Lumpur	37	(3)
2020–	Sarawak United		

International career^{‡}
2012–2015	Malaysia U-23		
- * Club domestic league appearances and goals as of 10 August 2021 ‡ National team caps and goals as of 9 June 2018

Ashri bin Chuchu (born 27 February 1991 in Sarawak) is a Malaysian professional footballer who plays for Malaysia Premier League side Sarawak United mainly as a winger but can also plays as an attacking midfielder.

== Club career ==
Born and raised in Lawas, Sarawak, Ashri attended Tabuan Jaya Sport School.

In September 2013, he was injured but soon recovered and played against Perak and Sime Darby in the 2013 Malaysia Cup. While playing for Sarawak, Ashri was once hailed as one of Sarawak's best player. However, a leg injury caused him to be sidelined for quite sometime, and Ashri had since failed to find his touch.

After more than 8 years playing for Sarawak, Ashri has decided to leave the club as his contract ends in October 2016. On 29 October 2016, he signed a contract with Kuala Lumpur.

== Career statistics ==
As of 28 July 2018

Club	Season	League		Cup (Note: The Malaysia FA Cup)		League Cup (Note: The Malaysia Cup)		Continental		Total	
Club	Season	Apps	Goals	Apps	Goals	Apps	Goals	Apps	Goals	Apps	Goals
Kuala Lumpur	2017	16	1	1	0	4	0	–		21	1
Kuala Lumpur	2018	19	2	4	0	0	0	–		23	2
Kuala Lumpur Total		35	3	5	0	4	0	0	0	44	3

== International career ==
Ashri played in the 2013 ASEAN Games in Myanmar where he scored 2 goals against Brunei and Vietnam.

Ashri also played for Malaysia U-23 in 2014 Asian Games that was held in Incheon, South Korea.
