= Mạc Hồng Quân =

Overseas Vietnamese footballer

Personal information
- Full name: Mạc Hồng Quân
- Date of birth: 1 January 1992 (age 34)
- Place of birth: Chí Linh, Hải Dương, Vietnam
- Height: 1.80 m (5 ft 11 in)
- Positions: Attacking midfielder; forward

Team information
- Current team: Hưng Yên
- Number: 8

Youth career
- 2000–2007: FK Tachov
- 2007–2011: Sparta Prague

Senior career*
Years	Team	Apps	(Gls)
2011–2012	Sparta Prague B	4	(2)
2013–2014	FLC Thanh Hóa	16	(3)
2014	Hùng Vương An Giang	8	(3)
2015–2021	Than Quảng Ninh	133	(21)
2020	→ Hải Phòng (loan)	7	(0)
2022–2025	Quy Nhơn United	79	(1)
2025–2026	Quảng Ninh	5	(0)
2026	Becamex Hồ Chí Minh City	11	(1)
2026–	Hưng Yên	0	(0)

International career
2012–2015	Vietnam U23	25	(12)
2013–2017	Vietnam	14	(3)
- * Club domestic league appearances and goals as of 7 June 2026

Mạc Hồng Quân (born 1 January 1992) is a Vietnamese professional footballer who plays as an attacking midfielder and as a forward for V.League 2 club Hưng Yên. Born in Vietnam and grew up in Czech Republic, he played for the Vietnam national team between 2013 and 2017.

== Early life ==
Born in Hải Dương, Hong Quan migrated to Czech Republic with his family in 2000 at the age of 8. As a child, he played with FK Tachov, before joining AC Sparta Prague in 2007.

== Club career ==
=== AC Sparta Prague B ===
Hồng Quân began his professional career with the B squad of AC Sparta Prague. He captained the club during 2011–2012.

=== FLC Thanh Hoa ===
Hồng Quân made his highly anticipated debut in the V.League 1 when he signed with FLC Thanh Hóa before Matchday 12 of the 2013 season. However, after a poor start to the 2014 V.League 1 season, Thanh Hóa released Hồng Quân.

== International career ==
In June 2012, Mạc Hồng Quân was invited to train with the Vietnam U22 by the Vietnam Football Federation after being scouted by the Vietnam U19's coach Mai Đức Chung. He was selected for the final roster for the 2013 AFC U-22 Championships qualifiers.

On 15 September 2014, the underdogs Vietnam thrash Iran 4-1 in shock win in the men's football event of the 2014 Asian Games. Hong Quan assisted the first and scored the second goal after passing two Iran defenders before defeating goalkeeper Sedghi. He was praised by the Vietnamese media for his movement and ability to find space in dangerous areas.

Hong Quan was part of Vietnam's squad in the 2014 AFF Championship.

=== International goals ===
Scores and results list Vietnam's goal tally first.

==== Under-23 ====
#	Date	Venue	Opponent	Score	Result	Competition
1.	23 June 2012	Yangon, Thuwunna Stadium	Chinese Taipei	1–0	1-2	2013 AFC U-22 Championship qualification
2.	28 June 2012	Yangon, Thuwunna Stadium	Philippines	2-0	9-0	2013 AFC U-22 Championship qualification
3.	28 June 2012	Yangon, Thuwunna Stadium	Philippines	3-0	9-0	2013 AFC U-22 Championship qualification
4.	8 December 2013	Naypyidaw, Zayarthiri Stadium	Brunei	6–0	7-0	2013 Southeast Asian Games
5.	15 December 2013	Naypyidaw, Zayarthiri Stadium	Laos	5–0	5-0	2013 Southeast Asian Games
6.	17 December 2013	Naypyidaw, Zayarthiri Stadium	Malaysia	1-2	1-2	2013 Southeast Asian Games
7.	15 September 2014	South Korea, Ansan, Ansan Wa~ Stadium	Iran	2-0	4-1	2014 Asian Games
8.	20 May 2015	Bishan, Bishan Stadium	Brunei	3-0	6-0	2015 Southeast Asian Games
9.	2 June 2015	Bishan, Bishan Stadium	Malaysia	1-0	5-1	2015 Southeast Asian Games
10.	7 June 2015	Bishan, Bishan Stadium	Timor-Leste	2-0	4-0	2015 Southeast Asian Games
11.	15 June 2015	Kallang, National Stadium	Indonesia	1-0	5-0	2015 Southeast Asian Games

==== Vietnam ====
Scores and results list Vietnam's goal tally first.

#	Date	Venue	Opponent	Score	Result	Competition
1.	16 November 2014	Mỹ Đình National Stadium, Hanoi, Vietnam	Malaysia	1–1	3–1	Friendly
2.	17 May 2015	Mỹ Đình National Stadium, Hanoi, Vietnam	North Korea	1–0	1–1	Friendly
3.	10 October 2017	Mỹ Đình National Stadium, Hanoi, Vietnam	Cambodia	5–0	5–0	2019 AFC Asian Cup qualification

== Honours ==
Than Quang Ninh FC

- Vietnamese Cup: 2016
- Vietnamese Super Cup: 2016

Vietnam U23

- Southeast Asian Games Bronze medal: 2015

Individual

- V.League 1 Team of the Season: 2019

== Personal life ==
Mạc Hồng Quân began dating Vietnamese model Kỳ Hân in early 2016. The couple got married on June 26, 2016. Their first child, a son, Tỏi, was born in 2017.
