= Kwanruethai Kunupatham =

Thai footballer (born 1990)

Personal information
- Full name: Kwanruethai Kunupatham
- Date of birth: 19 October 1990 (age 36)
- Place of birth: Nakhon Sawan, Thailand
- Position: Defender

Team information
- Current team: BG-Bandit Asia

International career^{‡}
Years	Team	Apps	(Gls)
2010–	Thailand	2	(0)
- ‡ National team caps and goals as of 25 May 2010

Kwanruethai Kunupatham (born 19 October 1990 ) is a Thai international footballer who plays as a defender.

== International goals ==
No.	Date	Venue	Opponent	Score	Result	Competition
1.	14 December 2013	Mandalarthiri Stadium, Mandalay, Myanmar	Malaysia	5–1	6–1	2013 Southeast Asian Games
2.	14 December 2013	Mandalarthiri Stadium, Mandalay, Myanmar	Malaysia	6–1	6–1	2013 Southeast Asian Games
3.	18 December 2013	Mandalarthiri Stadium, Mandalay, Myanmar	Myanmar	2–1	2–2 (a.e.t.) (9–8 p)	2013 Southeast Asian Games
