= Darren Forsyth =

Irish footballer

Personal information
- Full name: Darren George Joseph Forsyth
- Date of birth: 21 January 1988 (age 38)
- Place of birth: Dublin, Ireland
- Position: Forward

Youth career
- St. Joseph's Boys
- Cherry Orchard

Senior career*
Years	Team	Apps	(Gls)
2006–2008	UCD	8	(0)
2008	Shelbourne	11	(5)
2009	Bray Wanderers	9	(0)
2009–2010	Gateshead	5	(0)
2009	→ Dunston UTS (loan)	4	(1)
2010	Shelbourne	5	(1)
2014–2015	Glenavon	5	(0)
2015	Warrenpoint Town	0	(0)
- * Club domestic league appearances and goals

Darren Forsyth (born 21 January 1988) is an Irish former professional footballer who played as a forward for Warrenpoint Town in the NIFL Premiership.

== Career ==
=== Early career ===
He started his playing career with St Josephs Boys AFC Sallynoggin before moving to Cherry Orchard. During his time at Cherry Orchard, he played in the Cup where they were defeated by Manchester United. After finishing the Cherry Orchard season, he signed for UCD. He represented his county and province in several representative teams throughout the years, and was also selected for the Irish schools team in 2006 where he earned 6 caps. In 2006, he moved to UCD and was called up to the first team in 2007.

=== College ===
After completing the Leaving Certificate, Forsyth moved to UCD on a scholarship in August 2006. He played for the under-21s, finishing as the team's top scorer in 2006. In mid-2007, he made his senior debut against Longford Town. He also played for the college in both the Harding Cup and the Collingwood Cup, winning both competitions. Forsyth scored in both finals, twice in the Harding Cup and once in the Collingwood Cup. He received the player of the tournament and top scorer award in the Harding Cup. Although he dropped out of his Arts course, he continued to play for the college team while pursuing a professional career.

=== Career to date ===
Forsyth began his senior career at UCD. In 2007, he represented the Irish under-19s team in the Oporto Tournament in Portugal, earning two caps against Portugal and Ukraine. He also played for the UCD under-18s team, which reached the semi-final; Forsyth scored several goals in the competition. He also represented the Irish universities team. Forsyth was a leading figure for UCD's under-21 squad during the first half of the 2007 season before breaking into the first team. He helped UCD win the Under-21 League of Ireland, defeating St. Patrick's Athletic after a penalty shootout on 15 November 2007 in the final at Belfield Park.

On 28 July 2008, Forsyth signed for Shelbourne. He made his Shelbourne debut on 1 August 2008 against Athlone Town at Tolka Park, scoring two goals in a 3–3 draw. Forsyth scored five goals in 11 appearances for Shels during the 2008 season, helping the club to a second-place finish in the First Division. Despite initially re-signing for Shels for the 2009 season, he was released by the club on 9 February 2009 and signed for Premier Division club Bray Wanderers He made his Bray Wanderers debut against Shamrock Rovers on 6 March 2009 at the Carlisle Grounds. He made 10 league and cup appearances during his six-month spell with Bray.

Forsyth appeared for Gateshead in a trial against Sunderland on 18 July 2009, scoring one of the four goals in a 4–1 victory. He also appeared and scored in Gateshead's 4–0 win over Durham City three days later. On 27 July 2009, Bray Wanderers announced Forsyth's signing for Gateshead. After being limited to 5 appearances in three months at Gateshead, Forsyth joined Dunston UTS on a month-long loan at the end of October 2009, making his debut against Bedlington Terriers on 31 October 2009. Gateshead released Forsyth on 1 February 2010.

Forsyth returned to Ireland following his release and re-joined former club Shelbourne for their 2010 First Division campaign. After establishing himself in Shels' first team during the early stages of the 2010 season, Forsyth fell out of favour and primarily played in their reserve team in the A Championship until his release by the club on 17 August 2010. In his second spell at Shelbourne, Forsyth made 8 league and cup appearances, scoring three goals.

Forsyth returned to semi-professional football on 1 September 2014, signing an initial short-term deal at NIFL Premiership club and 2013–14 Irish Cup winners Glenavon as a replacement for emigrating forward Guy Bates. After making five league appearances for the club, Forsyth was released by Glenavon on 2 January 2015. He eventually joined fellow NIFL Premiership club Warrenpoint Town. Forsyth is now retired from professional football and plays amateur football for Firhouse Clover in the Leinster Senior League.

== Honours ==
UCD

- League of Ireland U21 Division (1): 2007
