= Rozaimi Rahman =

Malaysian footballer

Personal information
- Full name: Muhammad Rozaimi bin Abdul Rahman
- Date of birth: 6 October 1992 (age 34)
- Place of birth: Bongawan, Papar, Malaysia
- Height: 1.75 m (5 ft 9 in)
- Positions: Winger; striker

Team information
- Current team: Sabah U23

Youth career
- 2011–2012: Sabah
- 2013: Harimau Muda A

Senior career*
Years	Team	Apps	(Gls)
2010	Sarawak	0	(0)
2011–2015	Sabah	31	(9)
2012	→ Selangor (loan)	10	(1)
2016	Johor Darul Ta'zim	0	(0)
2017–2020	Johor Darul Ta'zim II	43	(9)
2021	Kedah Darul Aman	9	(0)
2023	Machan F.C.	45	(7)
2024	Sabah U23 (Senior player)	0	(0)

International career^{‡}
2012–2015	Malaysia U23	22	(20)
2012	Malaysia	1	(0)

Managerial career
- 2022–present: Sabah (Assistant Chief of Talent Scouting)
- * Club domestic league appearances and goals as of 18 July 2022 ‡ National team caps and goals as of 18 July 2022

Muhammad Rozaimi bin Abdul Rahman (born 6 October 1992) is a Malaysian professional footballer who plays as a striker. He previously played for the defunct Sarawak, Sabah, Selangor, Kedah and Johor Darul Ta'zim II.

Rozaimi is a former Malaysian international and made his debut for the country against Sri Lanka in 2012. He rose to national prominence when he scored 10 goals in five appearances in the 2013 AFC U-22 Asian Cup qualification tournament while playing for the under-23 team, making him top scorer of the competition. He was listed as one of the top ten Asian players of 2012 by ESPN.

== Club career ==
Rozaimi began his career with Sarawak in 2010. He returned to Sabah in 2011 and made his Super League debut in 2–1 defeat against Terengganu. He scored his first Super League goal in away 1–1 draw against Perak.

Rozaimi along with Sabah President Cup squad, as Sabah U-23 squad, also played in the 2012 Sukma Games football tournament in Pahang, where he and the team achieved gold medal when they defeat Perak 3–0 in the final after extra time. Rozaimi himself scored in the final, and also helped to create the two other goals.

He agreed to join Selangor on a three-month loan for their 2012 Malaysia Cup campaign in August 2012, as Sabah failed to qualify for that tournament. On 4 September 2012, he score his only goal for Selangor in a 4–1 away win against Pahang.

Rozaimi joined Harimau Muda A for 2013 season on a loan. He did not play in any league in 2013 as Harimau Muda A were on a centralized training in Slovakia in a preparation for the 2013 Southeast Asian Games. He went back for Sabah for 2014–2015 season but his playing time was limited due to injury. Rozaimi ended his contract with Sabah in the 2015 season as he failed to fully recover from his injury.

He joined Johor Darul Takzim in 2016 and the club help him to recover from his injury. He played for the feeder team from 2017 until 2020. He won the 2019 Malaysia Challenge Cup with Johor Darul Ta'zim II. In 2021, he join Malaysian Super League club Kedah, playing only 9 league matches.

== Management and amateur career ==
He returned to Sabah in 2022 and elected as a scout for Sabah. He also joined an amateur team Tuaran and featured for them in the SAFA Sabah Cup. He scored the winning goal in the final against Tawau. In the same year he also play for Machan F.C, an amateur club in Sarawak. They were crowned as the champion of 2022 Sarawak League central zone. In 2023, he played for RTD FC in the Sabah SAFA Tawau League where he was crowned as the top scorer.

== International career ==
=== Under-23 ===
In July 2011, Rozaimi receive his first national called up from Ong Kim Swee for an exhibition match against Chelsea. He received his second call up for Olympic qualification match against Syria. Rozaimi was included in the squad for 2013 AFC U-22 Asian Cup qualification and became a top-scorer in the competition with 10 goals. He scored four goals in the 7–0 win over the Philippines, two goal against Chinese Taipei, three goals against Vietnam and one goal against Myanmar although Malaysia failed to advance to next stage after losing two match against Myanmar and South Korea. His debut then attracting scouts from BEC-Tero Sasana and S.C. Beira-Mar, although the demands was rejected by his club of Sabah FA at the time.

=== Senior team ===
On 28 April 2012, Rozaimi made his international debut in a friendly match against Sri Lanka.

== Career statistics ==
As of 18 April 2022

=== Club ===
Club	Season	League		Cup		League Cup		Other		Total	
Club	Season	Apps	Goals	Apps	Goals	Apps	Goals	Apps	Goals	Apps	Goals
Sabah	2011	11	1	–		5	1	–		16	2
Sabah	2012	13	6	1	0	–		1 (Note: Appearances in 2013 Malaysia Super League play-off.)	0	15	6
Sabah	2014	4	2	2	0	–		–		6	2
Sabah	2015	3	0	0	0	–		–		3	0
Sabah	Total	31	9	3	0	5	1	1	0	40	10
Johor Darul Ta'zim	2016	0	0	0	0	0	0	–		0	0
Johor Darul Ta'zim II	2017	16	2	1	0	–		–		17	2
Johor Darul Ta'zim II	2018	6	1	–		–		5 (Note: Appearances in 2018 Malaysia Challenge Cup.)	1	11	2
Johor Darul Ta'zim	2018	–		–		1	0	–		1	0
Johor Darul Ta'zim II
Johor Darul Ta'zim II	2019	14	6	–		–		7 (Note: Appearances in 2019 Malaysia Challenge Cup.)	2	21	8
Johor Darul Ta'zim II	2020	7	0	–		–		–		7	0
Johor Darul Ta'zim II	Total	43	9	1	0	1	0	12	3	57	12
Kedah	2021	9	0	–		–		–		9	0
Kedah	Total	9	0	–		–		–		9	0
Selangor (loan)	2012	–		–		10	1	–		10	1
Career total		83	18	4	0	16	2	13	3	116	23

== Statistics ==
=== International appearances ===
U23 international appearances
#	Date	Venue	Opponent	Result	Competition
1.	14 March 2012	Amman, Jordan	Syria	0–3 (L)	2012 Summer Olympic qualification (AFC)
2.	10 June 2012	Wuhan, China	China	0–1 (L)	Friendly
3.	17 June 2012	Shah Alam, Malaysia	Qatar	2–0 (W)	Friendly
4.	23 June 2012	Yangon, Myanmar	South Korea	2–3 (L)	2013 AFC U-22 Championship qualification
5.	25 June 2012	Yangon, Myanmar	Philippines	7–0 (W)	2013 AFC U-22 Championship qualification
6.	28 June 2012	Yangon, Myanmar	Chinese Taipei	4–2 (W)	2013 AFC U-22 Championship qualification
7.	30 June 2012	Yangon, Myanmar	Vietnam	3–0 (W)	2013 AFC U-22 Championship qualification
8.	3 July 2012	Yangon, Myanmar	Myanmar	1–2 (L)	2013 AFC U-22 Championship qualification
9.	22 February 2013	Yangon, Myanmar	Myanmar 'A'	0–0 (D)	Friendly
10.	26 February 2013	Vientiane, Laos	Laos 'A'	3–3 (D)	Friendly
11.	6 March 2013	Phnom Penh, Cambodia	Cambodia 'A'	1–3 (L)	Friendly
12.	7 September 2013	Kuantan, Malaysia	Singapore	1–0 (W)	2013 Merdeka Tournament
13.	11 September 2013	Kuantan, Malaysia	Thailand Selection	3–0 (W)	2013 Merdeka Tournament
14.	4 November 2013	Phnom Penh, Cambodia	Laos	3–2 (W)	2013 BIDC Cup
15.	8 November 2013	Phnom Penh, Cambodia	Myanmar	0–1 (L)	2013 BIDC Cup
16.	12 November 2013	Amman, Jordan	Jordan	1–3 (L)	Friendly
17.	14 November 2013	Amman, Jordan	Jordan	0–5 (L)	Friendly
18.	10 December 2013	Naypyidaw, Myanmar	Brunei	2–0 (W)	2013 Southeast Asian Games
19.	15 December 2013	Naypyidaw, Myanmar	Singapore	1–1 (D)	2013 Southeast Asian Games
20.	17 December 2013	Naypyidaw, Myanmar	Vietnam	2–1 (W)	2013 Southeast Asian Games
21.	19 December 2013	Naypyidaw, Myanmar	Indonesia	1–1 (D)	2013 Southeast Asian Games
22.	21 December 2013	Naypyidaw, Myanmar	Singapore	1–2 (L)	2013 Southeast Asian Games

=== International goals ===
U23 international goals
#	Date	Venue	Opponent	Score	Result	Competition
1.	17 June 2012	Shah Alam, Malaysia	Qatar	2–0	2–0 (W)	Friendly
2.	25 June 2012	Yangon, Myanmar	Philippines	1–0	7–0 (W)	2013 AFC U-22 Championship qualification
3.	25 June 2012	Yangon, Myanmar	Philippines	3–0	7–0 (W)	2013 AFC U-22 Championship qualification
4.	25 June 2012	Yangon, Myanmar	Philippines	5–0	7–0 (W)	2013 AFC U-22 Championship qualification
5.	25 June 2012	Yangon, Myanmar	Philippines	6–0	7–0 (W)	2013 AFC U-22 Championship qualification
6.	28 June 2012	Yangon, Myanmar	Chinese Taipei	1–0	4–2 (W)	2013 AFC U-22 Championship qualification
7.	28 June 2012	Yangon, Myanmar	Chinese Taipei	3–0	4–2 (W)	2013 AFC U-22 Championship qualification
8.	30 June 2012	Yangon, Myanmar	Vietnam	1–0	3–0 (W)	2013 AFC U-22 Championship qualification
9.	30 June 2012	Yangon, Myanmar	Vietnam	2–0	3–0 (W)	2013 AFC U-22 Championship qualification
10.	30 June 2012	Yangon, Myanmar	Vietnam	3–0	3–0 (W)	2013 AFC U-22 Championship qualification
11.	3 July 2012	Yangon, Myanmar	Myanmar	1–2	1–2 (L)	2013 AFC U-22 Championship qualification
12.	26 February 2013	Vientiane, Laos	Laos 'A'	2–1	3–3 (D)	Friendly
13.	11 September 2013	Kuantan, Malaysia	Thailand Selection	2–0	3–0 (W)	2013 Merdeka Tournament
14.	11 September 2013	Kuantan, Malaysia	Thailand Selection	3–0	3–0 (W)	2013 Merdeka Tournament
15.	14 September 2013	Kuantan, Malaysia	Myanmar	1–0	2–0 (W)	2013 Merdeka Tournament
16.	4 November 2013	Phnom Penh, Cambodia	Laos	1–0	3–2 (W)	2013 BIDC Cup
17.	4 November 2013	Phnom Penh, Cambodia	Laos	2–0	3–2 (W)	2013 BIDC Cup
18.	12 November 2012	Amman, Jordan	Jordan	1–3	1–3 (L)	Friendly
19.	10 December 2013	Naypyidaw, Myanmar	Brunei	1–0	2–0 (W)	2013 Southeast Asian Games
20.	15 December 2013	Naypyidaw, Myanmar	Singapore	1–1	1–1 (D)	2013 Southeast Asian Games

== Personal life ==
Rozaimi was born in Bongawan, Sabah, Malaysia. On 6 July 2015, while travelling with his cousin in the city of Kota Kinabalu, they were involved in a car accident which eventually affected Rozaimi's career permanently. He survived the accident but seriously injured, while his cousin was killed. Through his recovering period, Rozaimi then launched his own barber shop located in Tanjung Aru, Kota Kinabalu, in September 2015.

== Honours ==
=== Club ===
Johor Darul Ta'zim II

- Malaysia Challenge Cup: 2019

=== International ===
- Pestabola Merdeka: 2013

=== Individual ===
- Best Young Players: 2012
- 2013 AFC U-22 Asian Cup qualification top scorer: 10 goals
- 2013 Pestabola Merdeka Golden Boot winner: 3 goals
- ESPN Top Ten Asian Players of 2012
