= Fellipe Bertoldo =

Brazilian footballer (born 1991)

Personal information
- Full name: Fellipe Bertoldo dos Santos
- Date of birth: 5 January 1991 (age 35)
- Place of birth: São Paulo, Brazil
- Height: 1.79 m (5 ft 10 in)
- Position: Midfielder

Youth career
- 2007–2010: Paulista

Senior career*
Years	Team	Apps	(Gls)
2011	SE Palmeiras	0	(0)
2011	SE Palmeiras II	11	(0)
2012	Guaçuano	12	(0)
2013	Botafogo-SP	18	(3)
2014	Inter de Bebedouro		
2015	Oita Trinita	0	(0)
2015	→ Verspah Oita (loan)	12	(3)
2016	Esteghlal Khuzestan	10	(0)
2016	Mitra Kukar	2	(0)
2016–2017	Suwaiq		
2017	Arema	0	(0)

International career
2014	Timor-Leste U23	2	(0)
2014–2015	Timor-Leste	5	(1)
- * Club domestic league appearances and goals

Fellipe Bertoldo dos Santos (born 5 January 1991) is a Brazilian former professional footballer who played as a midfielder.

He formerly played for Mitra Kukar in the Indonesia Soccer Championship. In January 2016 he signed a one-year contract with the Iranian team Esteghlal Khuzestan F.C.

Despite having no links with East Timor, he had been naturalised and played for the country's national team between 2014 and 2015. On 19 January 2017, the Asian Football Confederation declared Bertoldo and eleven other Brazilian men's footballers ineligible to represent East Timor. Two months later, the East Timorese passport he had received has been declared ‘null and void’ by the Ministry of Justice of East Timor.

== Career statistics ==
Club performance			League		Cup		Total	
Season	Club	League	Apps	Goals	Apps	Goals	Apps	Goals
Japan			League		Emperor's Cup		Total	
2015	Verspah Oita	Football League	2	0	-		2	0
2015	Oita Trinita	J2 League	0	0	-		0	0
Total			2	0	0	0	2	0

== Honours ==
Esteghlal Khuzestan

- Iran Pro League: 2015–16

Arema

- Indonesia President's Cup: 2017
