= A. Thamil Arasu =

Malaysian footballer

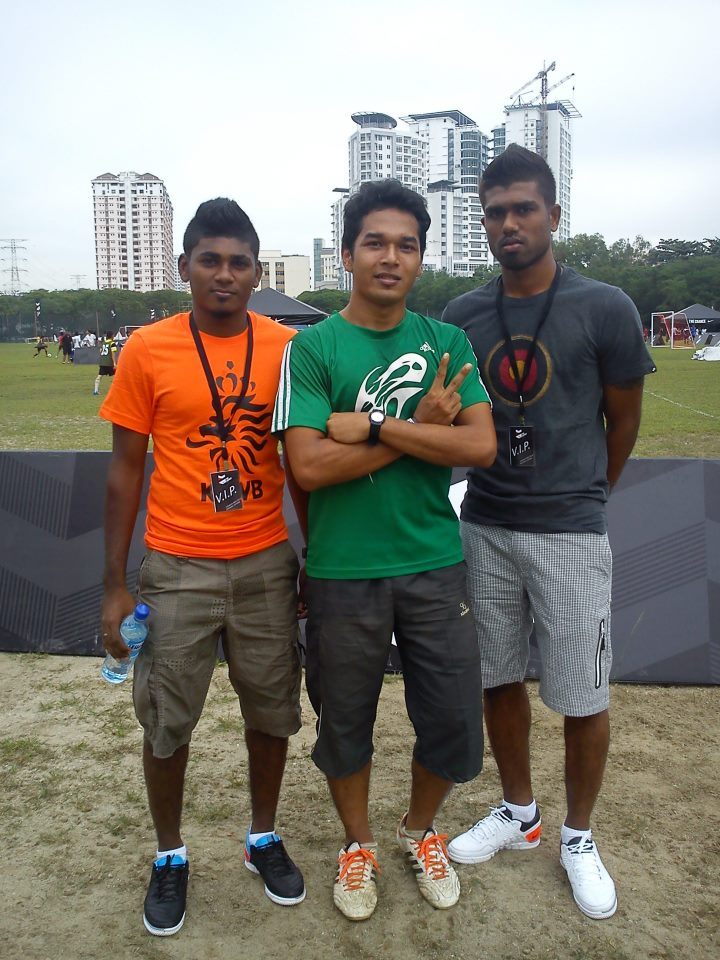
- Thamil with D. Saarvindran

Personal information
- Full name: Thamil Arasu a/l Ambumamee
- Date of birth: 4 July 1991 (age 35)
- Place of birth: Banting, Selangor, Malaysia
- Height: 1.78 m (5 ft 10 in)
- Position: Forward

Youth career
- 2004–2008: Bukit Jalil Sports School

Senior career*
Years	Team	Apps	(Gls)
2008–2010	Harimau Muda		
2010–2013	Harimau Muda A		
2014–2015	Selangor FA		
2016	Kuala Lumpur FA		
2018	Petaling Jaya Rangers		
2019–2020	Petaling Jaya City	1	(0)

International career^{‡}
2009–2010	Malaysia U-21		
2011–2014	Malaysia U-23		
Medal record
Malaysia U23
Sea Games
Gold medal – first place	Sea Games 2011	Football
- * Club domestic league appearances and goals as of January 18, 2018 ‡ National team caps and goals as of January 02, 2017

Thamil Arasu a/l Ambumamee is a former Malaysian footballer who played as a forward.

He was once was called up to play for the Malaysian senior team on 22 November 2010 for the 2010 AFF Suzuki Cup after Ahmad Fakri Saarani was injured. But later, Thamil was not included at the final 22-man squad for the 2010 AFF Suzuki Cup.

== Honours ==
Club

Harimau Muda

- Malaysia Premier League : 2009
- International U-21 Football Tournament Thanh Nien Cup : 2012

International

- SEA Games : 2011
- Pestabola Merdeka : 2013

Individual

- AFF U-19 Youth Championship Top Scorer: 2009
