= D. Saarvindran =

Malaysian footballer

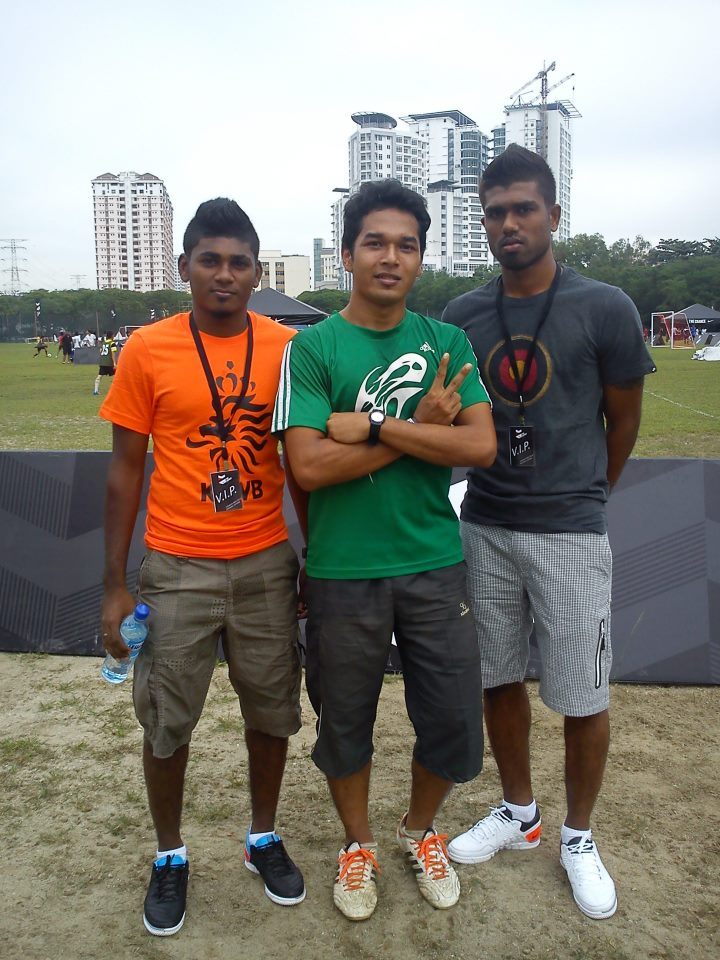
- Saarvindan with A. Thamil Arasu

Personal information
- Full name: Saarvindran a/l Devandran
- Date of birth: 4 October 1992 (age 34)
- Place of birth: Selangor, Malaysia
- Height: 1.66 m (5 ft 5 1/2 in)
- Positions: Winger; midfielder

Team information
- Current team: Penang
- Number: 70

Youth career
- 2008–2010: Bukit Jalil Sports School

Senior career*
Years	Team	Apps	(Gls)
2010–2012	Harimau Muda B	21	(6)
2012–2014	Harimau Muda A	34	(9)
2015–2016	Pahang	25	(1)
2017–2018	Johor Darul Ta'zim II	38	(6)
2019–2020	Terengganu	4	(0)
2021–	Penang	10	(0)

International career^{‡}
2011–2013	Malaysia U-21	5	(0)
2011–2015	Malaysia U-23	10	(3)
- * Club domestic league appearances and goals as of 29 August 2021 ‡ National team caps and goals as of 23 January 2017

Saarvindran a/l Devandran (born 4 October 1992 in Selangor) is a Malaysian footballer who plays for Penang in Malaysia Super League. He is known for his fast pace and long range shooting.

Saarvindran captained Harimau Muda B at the 2011 Malaysia Premier League.

On 16 November 2014, Saarvindran has confirmed that he will be joining Pahang for 2015 season. He has been granted permission to leave Harimau Muda A, the Malaysia U-23 national programme and further their careers in the domestic league.

After two years stint with Pahang, Saarvindran completed his transfer to Johor Darul Ta'zim II on 10 January 2017.

== International goals ==
=== Under-23 ===
#	Date	Venue	Opponent	Score	Result	Competition
1.	25 June 2012	Bogyoke Aung San Stadium	Philippines	7–0	7–0 (W)	2013 AFC U-22 Asian Cup qualification
2.	28 June 2012	Bogyoke Aung San Stadium	Chinese Taipei	4–1	4–2 (W)	2013 AFC U-22 Asian Cup qualification
3.	30 May 2015	Jalan Besar Stadium	Timor-Leste	1–0	1–0 (W)	2015 Southeast Asian Games
