= Zayarthiri Stadium =

Multi-use stadium in Naypyidaw, Myanmar

Coordinates: 19.89595°N 96.24870°E

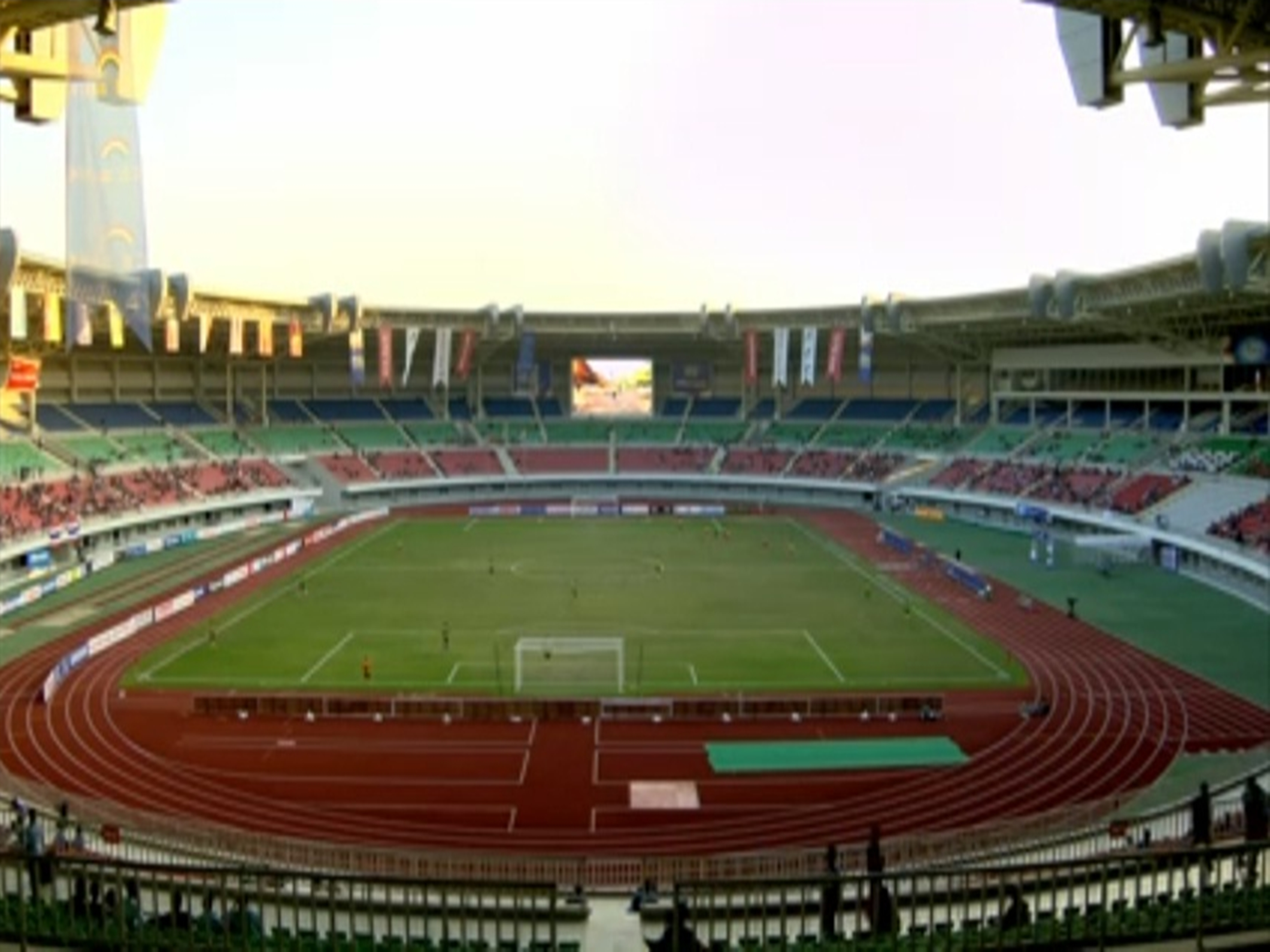
- Interactive map of Zayarthiri Stadium
- Location: Naypyidaw, Myanmar
- Owner: Myanmar Armed Force
- Capacity: 35,000

Construction
- Opened: November 2012

Tenant
- 2013 Southeast Asian Games

Zayarthiri Stadium (Burmese: ဇေယျာသီရိ အားကစားကွင်း) is a multi-use stadium in Naypyidaw, Myanmar. It has a capacity of 30,000 spectators. Having been completed in 2012, it is used mostly for football and athletics competitions. It also hosted men's football tournament for the 2013 Southeast Asian Games. It was built along with Wunna Theikdi Stadium.
