= Malaysia national under-23 football team =

National football team

Malaysia U-23
- Nickname: Harimau Muda
- Association: Football Association of Malaysia
- Confederation: AFC (Asia)
- Sub-confederation: AFF (Southeast Asia)
- Head coach: Brad Maloney
- Captain: Ubaidullah Shamsul
- Most caps: Fadhli Shas (50)
- Top scorer: Rozaimi Rahman (20); Akmal Rizal (20)
- Home stadium: Bukit Jalil National Stadium
- FIFA code: MAS
First colours	Second colours

First international
- Malaysia 1–1 Japan (Kuala Lumpur, Malaysia; December 1990)

Biggest win
- Malaysia 11–0 Timor-Leste (Vientiane, Laos; 2 December 2009)

Biggest defeat
- Thailand 9–0 Malaysia (Bangkok, Thailand; November 1998)

Asian Games
- Appearances: 4 (first in 2002)
- Best result: Round of 16 (2010, 2018)

AFC U-23 Championship
- Appearances: 3 (first in 2018)
- Best result: Quarter-finals (2018)

Southeast Asian Games
- Appearances: 12 (first in 2001)
- Best result: Gold Medal (2009, 2011)
Medal record
Malaysia national under-23 football team
Medal record
SEA Games
Silver medal – second place	2001 Malaysia	Team
Bronze medal – third place	2003 Vietnam	Team
Bronze medal – third place	2005 Philippines	Team
Gold medal – first place	2009 Laos	Team
Gold medal – first place	2011 Indonesia	Team
Silver medal – second place	2017 Malaysia	Team
Bronze medal – third place	2025 Thailand	Team
Merdeka Tournament
Gold medal – first place	2007 Malaysia	Team
Gold medal – first place	2013 Malaysia	Team

The Malaysia national under-23 football team (Malay: Pasukan bola sepak kebangsaan bawah-23 Malaysia), also known as Malaysia Under-23, Malaysia U23 or Malaysia Olympic football team is the national association football team of Malaysia in under-23 and 22 level, representing the country at the Olympic Games, Asian Games and Southeast Asian Games, as well as any other under-23 international football tournaments including the AFC U-23 Championship.

It is controlled by the Football Association of Malaysia (FAM). The team won the 2009 and 2011 SEA Games gold medal.

== History ==
The team is considered to be the feeder team for the Malaysia national football team. It is for players aged 23 and less, however 3 senior players can also be selected to play. Also in existence are national teams for the Under-20s, Under-17s and Under-15s. As long as they are eligible, players can play at any level, hence it is possible for one to play for the U-23s, senior side and then again for the U-23s.

=== Olympic 2000 ===
After the 1997 FIFA World Youth Championship, FAM was aiming to qualify for the 2000 Sydney Olympic. Thus, the FAM spent about US$6 million and continued the contract of Malaysian youth team coach, Hatem Souissi. Then FAM formed a squad known as Olympic 2000 with a combination of 1997 youth squad and other under 23 players. FAM decided to include Olympic 2000 as one of the teams in Malaysia League. Their first match was against Johor FA in a qualification match for Malaysia Premier I League. The team won their first match away 1–0 before drawing 1–1 at home to qualify for Malaysia Premier I League. However the team finished bottom during the 1998 season with only 4 wins in 22 matches. The Olympic 2000 also showed poor performance at the international stage. They were humiliated by the Thailand Asian Games squad in a 1998 friendly match as the Thais beat them 9–0. During the qualification matches, Olympic 2000 only managed to finish third behind Hong Kong and Japan. It was questioned among fans how a squad that had been playing together since 1995 with fine talents and given so much exposure cannot achieve expectations.

=== Disbandment of Harimau Muda ===
After Harimau Muda project disbanded, FAM needed a fresh start for the U-23 team where a new set of players was brought in for the team with the creation of SEA Games Project 2017 team. The players in the team mainly consisted of players with ages around 18 to 21 years old where the oldest players will be below the age requirement of 22 years old when 2017 SEA Games in Malaysia started. With a bigger pool of players within age of 18–22, the players in the team will also play in other age-restricted tournament as the younger side such as U-21 and U-22 when needed.

== Revival of the team ==
=== Southeast Asian Games ===
==== 2009 Southeast Asian Games ====
In July 2009, K. Rajagopal was named as the new coach of the Malaysia U-23 team. Under his management, Malaysia qualified for the semifinals of the 2009 SEA Games after becoming the runners-up of Group A with only one point behind the group champion, Vietnam. Malaysia then defeated Laos 3–1 in the semifinals, before meeting Vietnam again and defeating them 1–0 in the final with an own goal scored by Mai Xuân Hợp in 85th minute. This was to be their fifth SEA Games gold medal and also the first great achievement for the U-23 team under Rajagopal who also led Malaysia to qualify for the second round of the 2010 Asian Games as one of the four best third-placed teams after a lapse of 32 years.

==== 2011 Southeast Asian Games ====

2011 SEA Games winners final starting line-up.

In 2011, the team was taken over by Ong Kim Swee. The new coach later arranged two friendly matches against Thailand and Singapore in preparation for the 2012 Olympics qualifiers. Malaysia lost narrowly by 1–2 to Thailand but won 2–0 against Singapore.

Malaysia then advanced to the semifinals of the 2011 SEA Games by topping Group A after defeating the host, Indonesia 1–0. Then, Malaysia also beat Myanmar 1–0 in the semifinals to advance to the final. In the final, they met Indonesia again and held them to a 1–1 draw until the end, resulting in a penalty shoot-out which Malaysia won 4–3. This was also the sixth SEA Games football gold medal led by Ong Kim Swee after the successful achievement in 2009.

=== Summer Olympics Qualification ===
==== 2012 Summer Olympics Qualification ====
The team then continued their success by qualifying for the third round of 2012 Olympic Asian Qualifiers after defeating Pakistan in the first round and Lebanon in the second round where they became the sole team from Southeast Asia to qualify for the third round. However, in the third round, Malaysia lost all of their first three third round matches at the 2012 Olympic Asian qualifying matches, losing 0–2 to both Japan and Syria and 2–3 to Bahrain. Malaysia also lost their second three third round matches and was subsequently eliminated.

=== AFC U-23 Championship ===
==== 2018 AFC U-23 Championship ====
Several years after the revival, the team made another debut to pass the AFC U-23 qualification in 2018. Positioned in Group H, the team managed to defeat Indonesia by a score of 3–0 while suffering a similar score defeat to Thailand in the second match, the team subsequently bounced back and defeated Mongolia by 2–0. By leading the group, Malaysia was able to qualify for the AFC U-23 Championship. The team was then placed in Group C, losing to Iraq in the first match by 1–4 before bouncing back to hold Jordan 1–1 and defeating Saudi Arabia 1–0, to end up as the group runner-up and subsequently became the first Southeast Asian representatives alongside Vietnam to qualify for the quarterfinal of the tournament for the first time in both teams' history. In their quarterfinal match however, Malaysia lost to South Korea by 1–2.

=== Asian Games ===
==== 2018 Asian Games ====
The team then achieved surprising results after being drawn in Group E in the 2018 Asian Games together with Kyrgyzstan, defending champion South Korea and Bahrain. Malaysia opened their group matches with a 3–1 victory against Kyrgyzstan before defeating the tournament favourites South Korea that was led by their 2018 FIFA World Cup players such as the famous pair of strikers Son Heung-min, Hwang Hee-chan and their goalkeeper Jo Hyeon-woo by 2–1, but the goalkeeper did not play in the match since he was rested. Malaysia's victory against South Korea is their first win against the South Korea in the Asian Games tournament after 16 years. With expectations running high from the fans and rising, the team however failed to continue their success after losing to Bahrain by 2–3 after already having qualified for the second round and leading the group. The team then met Japan and was eliminated from the tournament after their players wasted attacking opportunities by playing cautiously in addition to their defensive mistakes in the 90th minute that subsequently gave the advantage to their opponents with a penalty kick being awarded which was successfully converted by Japanese striker Ayase Ueda resulting in a 0–1 score until the end of the match.

== International scene ==
In 2009, the Malaysian team started using the same squad for their under-23 team and senior team under the new management of coach K. Rajagopal. The senior team uses players below the age of 23, together with their senior players like Safee Sali and Norhafiz Zamani Misbah. This was set for the national team to prepare for the challenges ahead of them. Since then, Malaysia also used some of their under-23 players for other tournaments such as the Ho Chi Minh City Cup, 2010 Asian Games and 2010 AFF Championship. Malaysia followed this practice since the Football Association of Malaysia chairman, HRH Sultan Ahmad Shah, planned this and set it mainly for Rajagopal. This is as a result of the humiliating loss of the senior team by 0–5 to the United Arab Emirates at the 2011 AFC Asian Cup qualification.

== Tournament records ==
=== Olympic Games ===
Olympic Games Record									Olympic qualification Record					
Year	Round	Position	GP	W	D*	L	GS	GA	Pld	W	D	L	GF	GA
(Spain) 1992	did not qualify								8	4	1	3	13	7
(United States) 1996	did not qualify								4	0	1	3	1	6
(Australia) 2000	did not qualify								8	3	2	3	17	17
(Greece) 2004	did not qualify								6	0	1	5	3	17
(China) 2008	did not qualify								6	1	1	4	4	9
(United Kingdom) 2012	did not qualify								10	2	2	6	7	17
(Brazil) 2016	did not qualify								did not qualify and reach best place in 2016 AFC U-23 Championship					
(Japan) 2020	did not qualify								did not qualify and reach best place in 2020 AFC U-23 Championship					
(France) 2024	did not qualify								5	2	0	3	6	5
(United States) 2028		–	–	–	–	–	–	–	–	–	–	–	–	–
Total	Best:	0/7	0	0	0	0	0	0	47	12	8	27	51	78

Note

- Since 1992, football at the Summer Olympics changes into Under-23 tournament.

=== Asian Games ===
Asian Games Record
Year	Round	Position	GP	W	D*	L	GS	GA
(South Korea) 2002	Group Stage	17/24	3	1	0	2	3	6
(Qatar) 2006	Group Stage	30/32	3	0	0	3	2	10
(China) 2010	Round of 16	14/24	4	1	0	3	3	9
(South Korea) 2014	Group Stage	19/29	3	1	0	2	4	6
(Indonesia) 2018	Round of 16	12/25	4	2	0	2	7	6
(China) 2022	did not enter							
Total	Best: Round 2	5/5	17	5	0	12	19	37

Asian Games History
Year	Round	Score	Result
2002	Round 1	Malaysia 0 – 1 Oman	Loss
2002	Round 1	Malaysia 0 – 4 South Korea	Loss
2002	Round 1	Malaysia 3 – 1 Maldives	Win
2006	Round 1	Malaysia 1 – 3 Oman	Loss
2006	Round 1	Malaysia 1 – 3 China	Loss
2006	Round 1	Malaysia 0 – 4 Iraq	Loss
2010	Round 1	Malaysia 2 – 1 Kyrgyzstan	Win
2010	Round 1	Malaysia 0 – 2 Japan	Loss
2010	Round 1	Malaysia 0 – 3 China	Loss
2010	Round of 16	Malaysia 1 – 3 Iran	Loss
2014	Round 1	Malaysia 0 – 3 South Korea	Loss
2014	Round 1	Malaysia 4 – 0 Laos	Win
2014	Round 1	Malaysia 0 – 3 Saudi Arabia	Loss
2018	Round 1	Malaysia 3 – 1 Kyrgyzstan	Win
2018	Round 1	Malaysia 2 – 1 South Korea	Win
2018	Round 1	Malaysia 2 – 3 Bahrain	Loss
2018	Round of 16	Malaysia 0 – 1 Japan	Loss

Note

- Since 2002, football at the Asian Games changes into Under-23 tournament.
- * : Denotes draws including knockout matches decided on penalty kicks.

=== AFC U-23 Asian Cup ===
AFC U-23 Asian Cup record								AFC U-23 qualification record					
Year	Round	Pld	W	D	L	GF	GA	Pld	W	D	L	GF	GA
(Oman) 2013	See Malaysia national under-22 football team							See Malaysia national under-22 football team					
(Qatar) 2016	Did not qualify							3	1	0	2	3	3
(China) 2018	Quarter-finals	4	1	1	2	4	7	3	2	0	1	5	3
(Thailand) 2020	Did not qualify							3	2	1	0	6	2
(Uzbekistan) 2022	Group stage	3	0	0	3	1	9	3	2	1	0	2	0
(Qatar) 2024	Group stage	3	0	0	3	1	6	3	2	0	1	6	1
(Saudi Arabia) 2026	Did not qualify							3	1	0	2	8	3
(Japan) 2028	To be determined							To be determined					
Total	Best: Quarter-finals	10	1	1	8	6	22	18	10	2	6	30	12

==== Note ====
- Since 2016 edition, AFC changes the competition format from under-22 into under-23 tournament.
- Since 2022 edition, the competition name changes to AFC U-23 Asian Cup. Before that edition, it was called AFC U-23 Championship.
- Bold in the Round column indicates that it was the team's best result in all editions of the competition.

=== SEA Games ===
SEA Games Record
Year	Round	Position	GP	W	D*	L	GS	GA
(Malaysia) 2001	Silver	2/9	5	4	0	1	10	2
(Vietnam) 2003	Bronze	3/8	5	3	1	1	17	8
(Philippines) 2005	Bronze	3/9	5	3	0	2	12	6
(Thailand) 2007	Group Stage	5/8	3	1	1	1	6	4
(Laos) 2009	Gold	1/9	6	5	0	1	22	5
(Indonesia) 2011	Gold	1/11	6	4	2	0	9	3
(Myanmar) 2013	Fourth Place	4/10	6	3	2	1	11	6
(Singapore) 2015	Group Stage	5/11	5	3	0	2	7	7
(Malaysia) 2017^{1}	Silver	2/11	6	5	0	1	11	5
(Philippines) 2019	Group Stage	8/11	4	1	1	2	6	5
(Vietnam) 2021	Fourth Place	4/10	6	2	3	1	10	8
(Cambodia) 2023	Group Stage	5/10	4	2	0	2	13	5
(Thailand) 2025	Bronze	3/9	4	2	0	2	6	5
Total	Best: Champions	13/13	65	38	10	17	140	69

Note

- ^{1} : The under-22 national team played at the 2017 edition.
- * : Denotes draws including knockout matches decided on penalty kicks.
- ** : Red border colour indicates tournament was held on home soil.

SEA Games History
Year	Round	Score	Result
2001	Round 1	Malaysia 5 – 0 Brunei	Win
2001	Round 1	Malaysia 2 – 1 Indonesia	Win
2001	Round 1	Malaysia 2 – 0 Vietnam	Win
2001	Semi-finals	Malaysia 1 – 0 Myanmar	Win
2001	Final	Malaysia 0 – 1 Thailand	Loss
2003	Round 1	Malaysia 8 – 1 Cambodia	Win
2003	Round 1	Malaysia 2 – 0 Singapore	Win
2003	Round 1	Malaysia 3 – 2 Myanmar	Win
2003	Semi-finals	Malaysia 3 – 4 Vietnam	Loss
2003	Third Place	Malaysia 1 – 1 Myanmar	Win*
2005	Round 1	Malaysia 5 – 0 Cambodia	Win
2005	Round 1	Malaysia 1 – 2 Thailand	Loss
2005	Round 1	Malaysia 4 – 2 Philippines	Win
2005	Semi-finals	Malaysia 1 – 2 Vietnam	Loss
2005	Third Place	Malaysia 1 – 0 Indonesia	Win
2007	Round 1	Malaysia 1 – 3 Vietnam	Loss
2007	Round 1	Malaysia 4 – 0 Laos	Win
2007	Round 1	Malaysia 1 – 1 Singapore	Draw
2009	Round 1	Malaysia 11 – 0 Timor-Leste	Win
2009	Round 1	Malaysia 1 – 3 Vietnam	Loss
2009	Round 1	Malaysia 4 – 0 Cambodia	Win
2009	Round 1	Malaysia 2 – 1 Thailand	Win
2009	Semi-finals	Malaysia 3 – 1 Laos	Win
2009	Final	Malaysia 1 – 0 Vietnam	Win
2011	Round 1	Malaysia 0 – 0 Singapore	Draw
2011	Round 1	Malaysia 2 – 1 Thailand	Win
2011	Round 1	Malaysia 4 – 1 Cambodia	Win
2011	Round 1	Malaysia 1 – 0 Indonesia	Win
2011	Semi-finals	Malaysia 1 – 0 Myanmar	Win
2011	Final	Malaysia 1 – 1 Indonesia	Win*
2013	Round 1	Malaysia 2 – 0 Brunei	Win
2013	Round 1	Malaysia 4 – 1 Laos	Win
2013	Round 1	Malaysia 1 – 1 Singapore	Draw
2013	Round 1	Malaysia 2 – 1 Vietnam	Win
2013	Semi-finals	Malaysia 1 – 1 Indonesia	Loss**
2013	Third Place	Malaysia 1 – 2 Singapore	Loss
2015	Round 1	Malaysia 1 – 0 Timor-Leste	Win
2015	Round 1	Malaysia 1 – 5 Vietnam	Loss
2015	Round 1	Malaysia 0 – 1 Thailand	Loss
2015	Round 1	Malaysia 2 – 0 Brunei	Win
2015	Round 1	Malaysia 3 – 1 Laos	Win
2017	Round 1	Malaysia 2 – 1 Brunei	Win
2017	Round 1	Malaysia 2 – 1 Singapore	Win
2017	Round 1	Malaysia 3 – 1 Myanmar	Win
2017	Round 1	Malaysia 3 – 1 Laos	Win
2017	Semi-finals	Malaysia 1 – 0 Indonesia	Win
2017	Final	Malaysia 0 – 1 Thailand	Loss
2019	Round 1	Malaysia 1 – 1 Myanmar	Draw
2019	Round 1	Malaysia 0 – 1 Philippines	Loss
2019	Round 1	Malaysia 4 – 0 Timor-Leste	Win
2019	Round 1	Malaysia 1 – 3 Cambodia	Loss
2021	Round 1	Malaysia 2 – 1 Thailand	Win
2021	Round 1	Malaysia 3 – 1 Laos	Win
2021	Round 1	Malaysia 2 – 2 Singapore	Draw
2021	Round 1	Malaysia 2 – 2 Cambodia	Draw
2021	Semi-finals	Malaysia 0 – 1 Vietnam	Loss
2021	Third Place	Malaysia 1 – 1 Indonesia	Loss**
2023	Round 1	Malaysia 5 – 1 Laos	Win
2023	Round 1	Malaysia 0 – 2 Thailand	Loss
2023	Round 1	Malaysia 1 – 2 Vietnam	Loss
2023	Round 1	Malaysia 7 – 0 Singapore	Win
2025	Round 1	Malaysia 4 – 1 Laos	Win
2025	Round 1	Malaysia 0 – 2 Vietnam	Loss
2025	Semi-finals	Malaysia 0 – 1 Thailand	Loss
2025	Third Place	Malaysia 2 – 1 Philippines	Win

*Win on penalty kicks.
**Loss on penalty kicks.

=== ASEAN U-23 ===
AFF U-23 Youth Championship Record
Year	Round	Position	GP	W	D*	L	GS	GA
(Thailand) 2005	Fourth Place	4th	5	2	2	1	7	10
(Indonesia) 2011	CC/DNP							
(Cambodia) 2019	Group Stage	5th	3	1	1	1	3	3
(Cambodia) 2022	Group Stage	7th	2	0	0	2	1	4
(Thailand) 2023	Fourth Place	4th	4	2	1	1	6	6
(Indonesia) 2025	Group Stage	8th	3	1	1	1	7	3
Total	Best: Fourth Place	5/5	17	6	5	6	24	26

Note

- * : Denotes draws including knockout matches decided on penalty kicks.

=== Summer Universiade ===
Summer Universiade Record
Year	Round	Position	GP	W	D*	L	GS	GA
(Russia) 2013	Eighth Place	8/15	5	1	1	3	4	10
Total	Best: Eighth Place	1/1	5	1	1	3	4	10

Note

- In the 2013 edition, Malaysia sent the U-23 team.
- * : Denotes draws including knockout matches decided on penalty kicks.

== Results and fixtures ==
The following is a list of match results in the last 12 months, as well as any future matches that have been scheduled.

Win Draw Lose

== Squad ==
=== Current squad ===
The following players were finalised for the 2025 SEA Games in Bangkok, Thailand.

No.	Pos.	Player	Date of birth (age)	Club
1	GK	Syahmi Adib Haikal	30 March 2003 (age 23)	(Football Association of Malaysia) Negeri Sembilan
	GK	Haziq Mukriz	19 April 2003 (age 23)	(Football Association of Malaysia) Penang II
16	GK	Zulhilmi Sharani	4 May 2004 (age 22)	(Football Association of Malaysia) Johor Darul Ta'zim II
2	DF	Aiman Hakimi	28 January 2005 (age 21)	(Football Association of Malaysia) Selangor
	DF	Ubaidullah Shamsul	30 November 2003 (age 22)	(Football Association of Malaysia) Terengganu
4	DF	Alif Ahmad	2 January 2003 (age 23)	(Football Association of Malaysia) Johor Darul Ta'zim II
5	DF	Shafizan Arshad	15 August 2005 (age 21)	(Football Association of Malaysia) Johor Darul Ta'zim II
13	DF	Aysar Hadi	4 September 2003 (age 23)	(Football Association of Malaysia) Johor Darul Ta'zim II
18	DF	Faris Danish	4 July 2006 (age 20)	(Football Association of Malaysia) Johor Darul Ta'zim II
19	DF	Aiman Yusuf	6 March 2006 (age 20)	(Football Association of Malaysia) Mokhtar Dahari Academy
20	DF	Zachary Zahidadil	27 May 2005 (age 21)	(Football Association of Malaysia) Terengganu F.C. III
22	DF	Moses Raj	10 August 2005 (age 21)	(Football Association of Malaysia) Selangor
6	MF	Danish Hakimi	6 January 2005 (age 21)	(Football Association of Malaysia) Johor Darul Ta'zim II
8	MF	Muhammad Khalil	11 April 2005 (age 21)	(Football Federation of Cambodia) Angkor Tiger
14	MF	Haziq Kutty Abba	28 September 2004 (age 22)	(Football Association of Malaysia) Penang
21	MF	Ariff Safwan	17 February 2005 (age 21)	(Football Association of Malaysia) Johor Darul Ta'zim II
10	MF	Haykal Danish	5 May 2005 (age 21)	(Football Association of Malaysia) Selangor
12	MF	Ziad El Basheer	24 December 2003 (age 22)	(Football Association of Malaysia) Johor Darul Ta'zim II
7	FW	Haqimi Azim	6 January 2003 (age 23)	(Football Association of Malaysia) Kuala Lumpur City
9	FW	Rahman Daud	4 December 2004 (age 21)	(Football Association of Malaysia) Selangor
	FW	Aliff Izwan	10 February 2004 (age 22)	(Football Association of Malaysia) Selangor
	FW	Fergus Tierney	19 March 2003 (age 23)	(Cyprus Football Association) Omonia 29M
17	FW	Rohisham Haiqal	24 October 2005 (age 21)	(Football Association of Malaysia) Selangor II

=== Recent call-ups ===
These players are called up over the last 12 months.

Pos.	Player	Date of birth (age)	Caps	Goals	Club	Latest call-up

== Team officials ==
As of 18 June 2026

Roles	Names	Appointment date
Team Management
Deputy CEO	(Malaysia) Stanley Bernard	15 April 2025
Coaching Staff
Head coach	vacant	vacant
Assistant coaches	(Malaysia) Hairuddin Omar	5 January 2025
Assistant coaches	(Japan) Atsuto Uchida	
Goalkeeping coach	vacant	vacant
Fitness coach	(Malaysia) Azmi Ibrahim	
Performance analyst	(Malaysia) Muhammad Fadhlin Adam	
Video analyst	(Malaysia) Ahmad Hilmi Abdul Latif	
Doctor	(Malaysia) Ridzuan Azmi	
Physiotherapist	(Malaysia) Harris Zafran Ahmad Haraman	
Team coordinator	(Malaysia) Zulfadli Rozi	17 March 2025
Technical director	(Malaysia) Tan Cheng Hoe	

== Coaches ==
- (Malaysia) Chow Kwai Lam (1990–1991)
- (England) Richard Bate (1992–1994)
- (France) Claude Le Roy (1994–1995)
- (Tunisia) Hatem Souissi (1997–1999)
- (England) Allan Harris (2000–2004)
- (Hungary) Bertalan Bicskei (2005)
- (Malaysia) Norizan Bakar (2005–2007)
- (Malaysia) B. Sathianathan (2007–2009)
- (Malaysia) K. Rajagopal (2009–2010)
- (Malaysia) Ong Kim Swee (2010–2015; 2017–2019)
- (Germany) Frank Bernhardt (2016–2017)
- (Australia) Brad Maloney (2021–2022)
- (Malaysia) E. Elavarasan (2022–2023)
- (Spain) Juan Torres Garrido (2023–2024)
- (Malaysia) Nafuzi Zain (2024–2026)

== Honours ==
=== Regional ===
- Southeast Asian Games
  - (gold) Gold medals (2): 2009 and 2011
  - (silver) Silver medals (2): 2001 and 2017
  - (bronze) Bronze medals (2): 2003, 2005 and 2025

=== Others ===
- Bangabandhu Cup
  - (gold) Winners (2): 1996/97, 2015
- Merdeka Tournament
  - (gold) Winners (2): 2007, 2013
- SCTV Cup
  - (gold) Winner (1): 2012
- Merlion Cup
  - (gold) Winner (1): 2023

== See also ==
- Malaysia national football team
- Malaysia women's national football team
- Malaysia national under-22 football team
- Malaysia national under-19 football team
- Malaysia national under-16 football team
- FAM-MSN Project

Preceded by 2007 Thailand	SEA Games Champions; 2009 (First title for U-23); 2011 (Second title for U-23)	Succeeded by 2013 Thailand
