= Philippines national football team records and statistics =

The lists shown below shows the Philippines national football team records in competitive and non-competitive tournaments, as well as individual and team records, and their head-to-head record against all opponents.

== Individual records ==
=== Player records ===
As of 2 October 2026
Players in bold are still active at international level.

==== Most capped players ====
Rank	Name	Caps	Goals	Career
1	Phil Younghusband	108	52	2006–2019
2	James Younghusband	98	12	2006–2019
3	Patrick Reichelt	93	16	2012–2024
4	Neil Etheridge	82	0	2008–2026
5	**Amani Aguinaldo**	76	0	2013–present
6	**Manny Ott**	75	4	2010–present
7	Chieffy Caligdong	71	16	2004–2013
8	Rob Gier	68	3	2009–2015
9	**Daisuke Sato**	67	4	2014–present
10	Stephan Schröck	61	6	2011–2023

==== Top goalscorers ====
Rank	Name	Goals	Caps	Ratio	Career
1	Phil Younghusband	52	108	0.48	2006–2019
2	**Bjørn Martin Kristensen**	16	20	0.8	2024–present
2	Chieffy Caligdong	16	71	0.23	2004–2013
2	Patrick Reichelt	16	93	0.17	2012–2024
5	Ángel Guirado	13	46	0.28	2011–2021
6	James Younghusband	12	98	0.12	2006–2019
7	Ian Araneta	9	49	0.18	2002–2013
8	Mark Hartmann	8	41	0.2	2011–2023
8	Misagh Bahadoran	8	60	0.13	2011–2018
10	Javier Patiño	7	20	0.35	2013–2019
10	**Jarvey Gayoso**	7	41	0.17	2017–present
10	Chris Greatwich	7	48	0.15	2004–2014

=== Manager records ===
As of 2 October 2026

Manager	Nat	Length	G	W	D	L	Win %
Alberto Honasan	(Philippines)	1987	4	0	0	4	0%
Carlos Cavagnaro	(Argentina)	1989	3	0	0	3	0%
Consorcio Manresa	(Philippines)	1991	2	1	1	0	50%
Eckhard Krautzun	(Germany)	1991–1992	5	1	1	3	20%
Mariano Araneta	(Philippines)	1993	2	1	0	1	50%
Rodolfo Alicante	(Philippines)	1993	3	0	0	3	0%
Noel C. Casilao	(Philippines)	1993–1996	11	1	0	10	9.09%
Juan Cutillas	(Spain)	1996–2000	21	1	2	18	4.76%
Rodolfo Alicante	(Philippines)	2000	3	0	0	3	0%
Masataka Imai	(Japan)	2001	7	0	1	6	0%
Sugao Kambe	(Japan)	2002–2003	5	0	0	5	0%
Jose Ariston Caslib	(Philippines)	2004–2007	15	4	2	9	26.67%
Norman Fegidero	(Philippines)	2008	3	2	1	0	66.67%
Juan Cutillas	(Spain)	2008–2009	4	2	1	1	50%
Jose Ariston Caslib	(Philippines)	2009	3	1	0	2	33.33%
Des Bulpin	(Scotland)	2009–2010	1	0	1	0	0%
Simon McMenemy	(Scotland)	2010	10	3	5	2	30%
Michael Weiß	(Germany)	2011–2014	44	21	11	12	47.73%
Thomas Dooley	(United States)	2014–2018	46	19	12	15	41.3%
Marlon Maro (Note: Maro only coached the team that took part at the 2017 CTFA International Tournament in Taiwan which was held in December 2017. Dooley remained the head coach. Maro was supposed to lead a U22 side, but the matches of the CTFA International Tournament were recognized as Tier 1 "A" international matches hence the Philippine Football Federation sent a senior side with Maro as its coach in lieu of Thomas Dooley.)	(Philippines)	2017	3	1	0	2	33.33%
Scott Cooper (caretaker)	(Republic of Ireland)	2018	2	0	2	0	0%
Anto Gonzales (Note: Gonzales only coached the team that took part at the 2018 Bangabandhu Cup in Bangladesh which was held in October 2018. Cooper remained the head coach.)	(Philippines)	2018	3	2	0	1	66.67%
Sven-Göran Eriksson	(Sweden)	2018–2019	9	2	2	5	22.22%
Scott Cooper	(Republic of Ireland)	2019	2	0	0	2	0%
Goran Milojević	(Serbia)	2019	4	2	1	1	50%
Scott Cooper	(Republic of Ireland)	2019–2021	4	1	1	2	25%
Stewart Hall	(England)	2021–2022	4	2	0	2	50%
Scott Cooper	(Republic of Ireland)	2022	2	0	0	2	0%
Thomas Dooley	(United States)	2022	4	2	1	1	50%
Josep Ferré	(Spain)	2022–2023	5	1	0	4	20%
Barae Jrondi	(Morocco)	2023	2	0	0	2	0%
Michael Weiß	(Germany)	2023–2024	7	2	2	3	28.57%
Tom Saintfiet	(Belgium)	2024	4	0	0	4	0%
Norman Fegidero (interim)	(Philippines)	2024	2	0	1	1	0%
Albert Capellas	(Spain)	2024–2025	10	4	3	3	40%
Carles Cuadrat	(Spain)	2025–present	14	7	3	4	50%

== Competition records ==
=== FIFA World Cup ===
The Philippines has never qualified for the FIFA World Cup. The national team entered the 1950 FIFA World Cup qualification but withdrew without playing a single game. The Philippines had intended to enter the 1962 edition but did not push through with the plan. The country's entry to the 1966 edition was not accepted due to its association not being able to pay the registration fee for the qualifiers and the national team withdrew from the 1974 FIFA World Cup qualification just as they did in the 1950 qualifiers. The national team made its first participation in a FIFA World Cup qualifiers for the 1998 edition.

At the 2002 FIFA World Cup qualifiers, Yanti Barsales made the first goal for the Philippines at a FIFA World Cup qualifier against Syria.

The national team did not enter the qualifiers for the next succeeding editions until the 2014 FIFA World Cup qualifiers, about 10 years later. The national team secured their first victory in a World Cup qualifier against Sri Lanka, 4–0.

FIFA World Cup record
Year	FIFA World Cup record							Qualification record						
Year	Round	Pld	W	D	L	GF	GA	Round	Pld	W	D	L	GF	GA
(Uruguay) 1930 to (France) 1938	Did not enter							Did not enter						
(Brazil) 1950	Withdrew							Withdrew						
(Switzerland) 1954 to (Chile) 1962	Did not enter							Did not enter						
(England) 1966	Entry not accepted							Entry not accepted						
(Mexico) 1970	Did not enter							Did not enter						
(West Germany) 1974	Withdrew							Withdrew						
(Argentina) 1978 to (United States) 1994	Did not enter							Did not enter						
(France) 1998	Did not qualify							Round 1	3	0	0	3	0	10
(South Korea) (Japan) 2002	Did not qualify							Round 1	6	0	1	5	2	29
(Germany) 2006 and (South Africa) 2010	Did not enter							Did not enter						
(Brazil) 2014	Did not qualify							Round 2	4	1	1	2	6	6
(Russia) 2018	Did not qualify							Round 2	8	3	1	4	8	12
(Qatar) 2022	Did not qualify							Round 2	8	3	2	3	12	11
(Canada) (United States) (Mexico) 2026	Did not qualify							Round 2	6	0	1	5	3	14
Total	0/23	-	-	-	-	-	-		35	7	6	22	31	82

=== Olympic Games ===
The senior national team never managed to qualify for the Olympics.

The Philippines' Olympic Games record
Year	Summer Olympics record							Qualifying record						
Year	Round	Pld	W	D	L	GF	GA	Round	Pld	W	D	L	GF	GA
(United Kingdom) 1908 to (Finland) 1952	Did not enter													
(Australia) 1956	Withdrew													
(Italy) 1960	Did not enter													
(Japan) 1964	Withdrew													
(Mexico) 1968	Did not qualify							Round 1	5	0	0	5	3	48
(West Germany) 1972	Did not qualify							Round 1	4	1	0	3	1	19
(Canada) 1976	Did not qualify							Round 1	2	0	0	2	0	6
(Soviet Union) 1980	Did not qualify							Round 1	5	0	0	5	0	32
(United States) 1984	Did not qualify							Round 1	5	0	0	2	1	17
(South Korea) 1988	Did not qualify							Round 1	4	0	0	4	0	31
1992–present	See Philippines national under-23 team													
Total	0/17	–	–	–	–	–	–	–	22	1	0	21	5	153

- Since 1992, the Olympic team has been drawn from a squad with a maximum of three players over 23 years of age, and the achievements of this team are not generally regarded as part of the national team's records, nor are the statistics credited to the players' international records.

=== AFC Asian Cup ===
The Philippines qualified once for the Asian Cup, in 2019. For the 2011 and the 2015 AFC Asian Cup, the Philippines attempted to qualify for the tournament through the AFC Challenge Cup. The Philippines would have been invited to host the 1968 Asian Cup, a tournament in which it did not qualify for, if Iran withdrew as hosts.

The Philippines' AFC Asian Cup record
Year	AFC Asian Cup record							Qualification record					
Year	Round	Pld	W	D	L	GF	GA	Pld	W	D	L	GF	GA
(Hong Kong) 1956	Did not qualify							2	0	0	2	0	5
(South Korea) 1960	Did not qualify							2	0	0	2	4	14
(Israel) 1964	Withdrew							Withdrew					
(Iran) 1968	Did not qualify							4	0	0	4	0	24
(Thailand) 1972	Withdrew							Withdrew					
(Iran) 1976	Withdrew							Withdrew					
(Kuwait) 1980	Did not qualify							3	0	0	3	1	10
(Singapore) 1984	Did not qualify							5	0	0	5	3	16
(Qatar) 1988	Did not enter							Did not enter					
(Japan) 1992	Did not enter							Did not enter					
(United Arab Emirates) 1996	Did not qualify							3	0	0	3	1	20
(Lebanon) 2000	Did not qualify							3	1	0	2	2	11
(China) 2004	Did not enter							Did not enter					
(Indonesia) (Malaysia) (Thailand) (Vietnam) 2007	Did not enter							Did not enter					
(Qatar) 2011	Did not qualify							AFC Challenge Cup					
(Australia) 2015	Did not qualify							AFC Challenge Cup					
(United Arab Emirates) 2019	Group stage	3	0	0	3	1	7	14	6	4	4	21	20
(Qatar) 2023	Did not qualify							11	4	3	4	13	15
(Saudi Arabia) 2027	Did not qualify							12	4	3	5	19	20
Total	Group stage	3	0	0	3	1	7	59	15	10	34	64	155

- After the inception of the AFC Challenge Cup, new changes in AFC Competition rules were made. Countries categorized as "emerging nations" which include the Philippines, do not enter Asian Cup qualification starting with the 2011 edition. Therefore, failure to qualify and failure to win the Challenge Cup automatically results in failure to qualify for the Asian Cup.

=== Asian Games ===
The senior national team made its best finish at the 1958 Asian Games where it reached the Quarterfinals of the tournament. The Philippines also has hosted the 1954 edition.

The Philippines' Asian Games record
Year	Round	Pld	W	D	L	GF	GA
(India) 1951	Withdrew						
(Philippines) 1954	Round 1	2	0	0	2	2	7
(Japan) 1958	Quarter-finals	3	1	0	2	2	8
(Indonesia) 1962	Round 1	3	0	0	3	1	27
(Thailand) 1966 and (Thailand) 1970	Did not enter						
(Iran) 1974	Round 1	3	0	0	3	0	21
(Thailand) 1978 to (Thailand) 1998	Did not enter						
Total	4/13	11	1	0	10	5	63

- Only until the 1998 edition is listed; football at the Asian Games changed to an under-23 tournament since the 2002 edition.

=== AFC Challenge Cup ===
The AFC Challenge Cup was organized as a route for nations classified as "emerging" or "developing" as a sole route to qualify for the Asian Cup. The Philippines is among these nations and participated at the inaugural 2006 AFC Challenge Cup. After a qualification phase was introduced the Philippines failed to qualify for the next two succeeding editions in 2008 and 2010. The Philippines qualified for the 2012 AFC Challenge Cup where the finished third. Phil Younghusband was the Golden Boot winner of the edition scoring six goals in the final tournament. The team reached the finals of 2014 edition of the tournament settling for second place after losing to Palestine in the finals. The AFC Challenge Cup tournament was dissolved after the 2014 edition.

The Philippines' AFC Challenge Cup record
Year	AFC Challenge Cup record							Qualification record						
Year	Round	Pld	W	D	L	GF	GA	Round	Pld	W	D	L	GF	GA
(Bangladesh) 2006	Group stage	3	0	2	1	2	3	No qualification						
(India) 2008	Did not qualify							Group stage	3	2	1	0	4	0
(Sri Lanka) 2010	Did not qualify							Group stage	3	1	0	2	3	8
(Nepal) 2012	Third place	5	3	0	2	9	8	Round 2	5	2	2	1	7	3
(Maldives) 2014	Runners-up	5	3	1	1	7	3	Group stage	2	2	0	0	9	0
Total	3/5	13	6	3	4	18	14	-	13	7	3	3	23	11

=== Far Eastern Games ===
Out of the ten football tournaments held in ten editions of the Far Eastern Games, The Philippines only won the inaugural 1913 edition despite fielding American, Spanish and British players violating tournament rules in that edition. The team was nevertheless named champions. China was awarded champions of the nine other editions of the tournaments. At the 1917 Far Eastern Games, the Philippines recorded its biggest victory in an international match to date, which was the 15–2 win against Japan. FC Barcelona player, Paulino Alcántara was part of the national squad.

The Philippines' Far Eastern Games record
Year	Round	Pld	W	D	L	GF	GA
(Philippines) 1913	Champions	1	1	0	0	2	1
(Republic of China (1912–1949)) 1915	Runners-up	3	0	2	1	1	2
(Japan) 1917	Runners-up	2	1	0	1	15	5
(Philippines) 1919	Runners-up	3	1	0	2	3	5
(Republic of China (1912–1949)) 1921	Runners-up	2	1	0	1	3	1
(Japan) 1923	Runners-up	2	1	0	1	2	4
(Philippines) 1925	Runners-up	2	1	0	1	5	5
(Republic of China (1912–1949)) 1927	Third place	2	0	0	2	2	5
(Japan) 1930	Third place	2	0	0	2	2	12
(Philippines) 1934	Third place	3	1	0	2	6	8
Total	10/10	22	7	2	13	41	48

=== ASEAN Championship ===
The Philippines participated in every edition of the ASEAN Championship except the 2008 edition where the team failed to qualify. Their first match in the tournament was a 0–5 defeat handed by Thailand in the 1996 edition. Freddy Gonzalez scored the first goal for the Philippines in the tournament in a 1–3 defeat, also to Thailand in the 1998 edition. Emelio Caligdong made a brace in the national team's 2–1 victory against Timor Leste in the 2004 edition. The victory was the first for the Philippines.

The national team fared poorly during the first seven editions of the tournament from 1996 to 2008 losing 19 out of 21 matches. The Philippines' worst defeat at the tournament was the 1–13 match against Indonesia at the 2002 edition which also remains the highest scoreline in the tournament as of 2014. The national team made to its first semi-finals in 2010.

ASEAN Championship record
ASEAN Championship record										Qualification record					
Year	Round	Pos	Pld	W	D	L	GF	GA	Squad	Pld	W	D	L	GF	GA
(Singapore) 1996	Group stage	10th	4	0	0	4	0	16	Squad	No qualification					
(Vietnam) 1998	Group stage	8th	3	0	0	3	3	11	Squad	2	0	1	1	1	2
(Thailand) 2000	Group stage	8th	3	0	0	3	0	8	Squad	No qualification					
(Indonesia) (Singapore) 2002	Group stage	9th	4	0	0	4	3	24	Squad	No qualification					
(Malaysia) (Vietnam) 2004	Group stage	7th	4	1	0	3	4	9	Squad	No qualification					
(Singapore) (Thailand) 2007	Group stage	7th	3	0	1	2	0	8	Squad	4	3	0	1	13	3
(Indonesia) (Thailand) 2008	Did not qualify									4	2	1	1	6	5
(Indonesia) (Vietnam) 2010	Semi-finals	4th	5	1	2	2	3	3	Squad	3	1	2	0	7	2
(Malaysia) (Thailand) 2012	Semi-finals	3rd	5	2	1	2	4	3	Squad	Qualified automatically					
(Singapore) (Vietnam) 2014	Semi-finals	4th	5	2	1	2	9	7	Squad	Qualified automatically					
(Myanmar) (Philippines) 2016	Group stage	6th	3	0	2	1	2	3	Squad	Qualified as co-hosts					
(ASEAN) 2018	Semi-finals	4th	6	2	2	2	7	7	Squad	Qualified automatically					
(Singapore) 2020	Group stage	5th	4	2	0	2	12	6	Squad	Qualified automatically					
(ASEAN) 2022	Group stage	7th	4	1	0	3	8	10	Squad	Qualified automatically					
(ASEAN) 2024	Semi-finals	3rd	6	2	3	1	7	7	Squad	Qualified automatically					
(ASEAN) 2026	Group stage	7th	4	1	0	3	5	7	Squad	Qualified automatically					
Total	Semi-finals	15/16	63	14	12	37	67	129	–	13	6	4	3	27	12

=== Southeast Asian Games ===
The senior national team managed to reach the semi-finals of the football tournament of the Southeast Asian Games before the football was made into an under-23 tournament.

The Philippines' Southeast Asian Games record
Year	Round	Pld	W	D	L	GF	GA
(Malaysia) 1977	Round 1	3	1	1	1	5	7
(Indonesia) 1979	Did not enter						
(Philippines) 1981	Round 1	2	0	0	2	0	3
(Singapore) 1983	Round 1	2	0	1	1	0	5
(Thailand) 1985	Round 1	2	0	0	2	0	13
(Indonesia) 1987	Did not enter						
(Malaysia) 1989	Round 1	3	0	0	3	1	10
(Philippines) 1991	Semi-finals	4	1	1	2	6	10
(Singapore) 1993	Round 1	3	0	0	3	1	11
(Thailand) 1995	Round 1	4	1	0	3	2	9
(Indonesia) 1997	Round 1	4	0	0	4	1	13
(Brunei) 1999	Round 1	4	0	0	4	3	18
Total	10/12	31	3	3	25	19	99

- Only until the 1999 edition is listed; football at the SEA Games changed to an under-23 tournament since the 2001 edition.
- The 1959–1975 editions are not listed as the Philippines were not yet members of the SEAP Federation.

=== FIFA ASEAN Cup ===
FIFA ASEAN Cup record
Year	Round	Pld	W	D	L	GF	GA	Squad
(Indonesia) 2026	Group stage	3	1	1	1	4	4	

=== Minor tournaments ===
The Philippines participated at numerous minor friendly tournaments. Aside from other national teams, the Philippine nationals also faced selection teams and club sides from other nations at some of these tournaments. The team made a podium finish, placing not below third place, at the Japanese Empire-sanctioned East Asian Games in 1940, the Long Teng Cup (2010, 2011) held in Taiwan, and all three editions of the Philippine Peace Cup (2012, 2013 and 2014) hosted by the home country.

The Philippines' minor tournaments record
Tournament	Round	Position	Pld	W	D	L	GF	GA
(Japan) 1940 East Asian Games (2600th Anniversary Since Kigen)	Group stage	3rd	3	0	2	1	3	4
(Federation of Malaya) 1962 Merdeka Tournament	Group stage	5th in group	4	0	0	4	2	23
(Malaysia) 1971 Merdeka Tournament	Group stage	11th	5	0	1	4	7	16
(Singapore) 1971 Pesta Sukan Cup	Quarter-finals	8th	2	0	0	2	1	4
(Indonesia) 1972 Jakarta Anniversary Tournament	Group stage	3rd in group	4	2	1	1	4	5
(Malaysia) 1972 Merdeka Tournament	Group stage	8th	5	1	2	2	8	10
(Singapore) 1972 Pesta Sukan Cup	Group stage	3rd in group	2	0	0	2	1	7
(South Korea) 1972 President's Cup Football Tournament	Group stage	8th	4	0	0	4	0	22
(Indonesia) 1981 Jakarta Anniversary Tournament	Group stage	3rd in group	3	1	0	2	2	15
(Thailand) 1982 King's Cup	Group stage	5th in group	4	0	0	4	0	6
1985 Brunei Merdeka Games	Group stage	3rd in group	2	0	0	2	1	8
1986 Brunei Merdeka Games	Group stage	3rd in group	2	0	0	2	1	6
(Philippines) 1986 President Aquino Cup	Group stage	4th	3	0	0	3	1	12
1987 Brunei Merdeka Games	Group stage	3rd in group	2	0	0	2	0	4
1990 Brunei Merdeka Games	Group stage	3rd in group	2	0	0	2	0	7
1991 Philippines International Cup	Group stage	4th	3	1	1	1	2	2
1993 Philippines International Cup	Third place match	4th	5	2	1	2	4	4
(Philippines) 1997 President's Cup	Third place match	4th	Unknown					
(Philippines) 1998 President's Centennial Cup	Third place match	4th	5	2	0	3	5	11
(Taiwan) 2010 Long Teng Cup	Group stage	3rd	3	1	1	1	8	5
(Taiwan) 2011 Long Teng Cup	Group stage	2nd	3	1	2	0	5	3
(Philippines) 2012 Philippine Peace Cup	Group stage	1st	3	3	0	0	9	1
(Philippines) 2013 Philippine Peace Cup	Group stage	1st	2	1	0	1	3	2
(Philippines) 2014 Philippine Peace Cup	Final	2nd	2	1	0	1	7	4
(Taiwan) 2017 CTFA International Tournament	Group stage	2nd	3	1	0	2	3	5
(Bangladesh) 2018 Bangabandhu Gold Cup	Semi-finals	3rd	3	2	0	1	4	3
(Singapore) 2022 FAS Tri-Nations Series	Group stage	3rd	2	0	0	2	0	4
(Malaysia) 2024 Merdeka Tournament	Third place match	4th	2	0	1	1	1	2
(Thailand) 2024 King's Cup	Third place match	3rd	2	1	0	1	4	3
Total	–	–	85	20	12	53	86	216

== Head-to-head record ==
Last match updated was against Thailand on 2 October 2026

Key
Positive balance (more Wins)
Neutral balance (equal W/L ratio)
Negative balance (more Losses)

Opponents	Pld	W	D	L	GF	GA	GD	Confederation
Afghanistan	3	1	2	0	3	2	+1	AFC
Australia	1	0	0	1	0	6	−6	AFC
Azerbaijan	1	0	0	1	0	1	−1	UEFA
Bahrain	7	1	2	4	5	10	−5	AFC
Bangladesh	3	2	0	1	6	3	+3	AFC
Bhutan	2	2	0	0	4	0	+4	AFC
Brunei	14	7	2	5	20	15	+5	AFC
Cambodia	13	4	5	4	21	15	+6	AFC
China	25	2	3	20	9	86	−77	AFC
Chinese Taipei	17	4	4	9	23	47	−24	AFC
Fiji	1	1	0	0	3	2	+1	OFC
Estonia	1	0	0	1	0	1	−1	UEFA
Guam	6	6	0	0	18	2	+16	AFC
Hong Kong	11	1	1	9	9	49	−40	AFC
India	4	1	1	2	4	8	−4	AFC
Indonesia	33	3	5	25	23	106	−83	AFC
Iran	1	0	0	1	1	7	−6	AFC
Iraq	2	0	0	2	0	6	–6	AFC
Israel	1	0	0	1	0	6	−6	UEFA
Japan	20	5	2	13	35	57	−22	AFC
Jordan	1	0	0	1	0	4	−4	AFC
Kuwait	4	0	0	4	2	9	−7	AFC
Kyrgyzstan	3	2	0	1	4	4	0	AFC
Laos	15	5	3	7	26	24	+2	AFC
Lebanon	2	0	0	2	1	14	−13	AFC
Macau	5	3	0	2	14	7	+7	AFC
Malaysia	22	1	6	15	5	79	−74	AFC
Maldives	7	5	1	1	16	8	+8	AFC
Mongolia	3	2	0	1	4	2	+2	AFC
Myanmar	18	4	4	10	21	41	−20	AFC
Nepal	7	5	1	1	15	2	+13	AFC
North Korea	4	1	1	2	4	7	−3	AFC
Oman	3	0	1	2	1	10	−9	AFC
Pakistan	2	1	1	0	5	3	+2	AFC
Palestine	4	1	1	2	4	8	–4	AFC
Papua New Guinea	1	1	0	0	5	0	+5	OFC
Qatar	1	0	0	1	0	5	−5	AFC
Singapore	26	4	4	18	14	62	−48	AFC
South Korea	8	0	0	8	0	37	−37	AFC
Sri Lanka	4	2	1	1	9	5	+4	AFC
Syria	5	0	0	5	3	25	−22	AFC
Tajikistan	9	4	4	1	14	10	+4	AFC
Thailand	28	4	2	22	17	80	−63	AFC
Timor-Leste	10	9	0	1	36	7	+29	AFC
Turkmenistan	4	2	0	2	4	7	−3	AFC
United Arab Emirates	1	0	0	1	0	4	−4	AFC
Uzbekistan	2	0	0	2	1	6	−5	AFC
Vietnam	20	2	2	16	14	55	−41	AFC
Yemen	5	1	3	1	5	4	+1	AFC
