= List of international goals scored by Phil Younghusband =

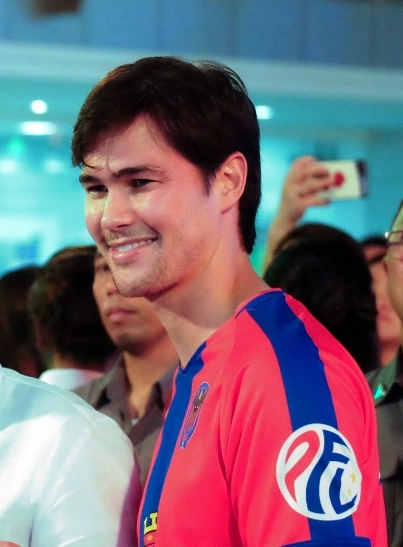
Phil Younghusband scored 52 goals in 108 appearances for the Philippines.

Phil Younghusband is a former professional footballer who played as a forward for the Philippines national football team from 2006 to 2019. He scored 52 goals with the national team, making him the all-time top goalscorer for the Philippines. He is also the nation's most capped player, having appeared in 108 matches. Younghusband's tenure coincided with the resurgence of the national team. Younghusband retired in November 2019 at the age of 32, in part due to his relegation to the bench for the 2019 AFC Asian Cup.

Younghusband was first called up to the Philippines national under-23 football team in 2005 after a gamer discovered his Filipino eligibility while playing Football Manager and notified the Philippine Football Federation. Younghusband received his first senior team call-up the following year. In his second national team appearance, he scored his first four international goals against Timor-Leste during the 2007 AFF Championship qualification. His 12th international goal was scored against Vietnam in a match dubbed "The Miracle of Hanoi"—Younghusband's goal secured a win for the underdog Philippines and sparked a football renaissance in the country. Younghusband's 50th international goal was a penalty kick against Tajikistan during the 2019 AFC Asian Cup qualification. The goal guaranteed the inclusion of the Philippines in the 2019 AFC Asian Cup, the highest level competition in the team's history.

Of Younghusband's 52 international goals, 15 were scored in the AFC Challenge Cup and its qualifiers, 14 in the AFF Championship and its qualifiers, 5 during AFC Asian Cup qualification, 2 during FIFA World Cup qualification, and 16 were scored in friendlies – including minor international tournaments such as the Long Teng Cup and the Philippine Peace Cup. He scored more against Timor-Leste than any other team, with six goals. Fifty of Younghusband's international goals were scored against Asian Football Confederation nations while the remaining two goals came against teams from the Oceania Football Confederation. Younghusband scored a hat‑trick twice during his international career and in both instances, he scored four goals.

== International goals ==
Scores and results list the Philippines' goal tally first, score column indicates score after each Younghusband goal.

Key
‡	Indicates goal was scored from a penalty kick

International goals scored by Phil Younghusband
No.	Cap	Date	Venue	Opponent	Score	Result	Competition	Ref.
1	2	14 November 2006	Panaad Stadium, Bacolod, Philippines	Timor-Leste	1–0	7–0	2007 AFF Championship qualification	
2	2	14 November 2006	Panaad Stadium, Bacolod, Philippines	Timor-Leste	2–0‡	7–0	2007 AFF Championship qualification	
3	2	14 November 2006	Panaad Stadium, Bacolod, Philippines	Timor-Leste	4–0	7–0	2007 AFF Championship qualification	
4	2	14 November 2006	Panaad Stadium, Bacolod, Philippines	Timor-Leste	6–0	7–0	2007 AFF Championship qualification	
5	4	20 November 2006	Panaad Stadium, Bacolod, Philippines	Brunei	2–0	4–1	2007 AFF Championship qualification	
6	4	20 November 2006	Panaad Stadium, Bacolod, Philippines	Brunei	4–1	4–1	2007 AFF Championship qualification	
7	7	17 May 2008	Barotac Nuevo Plaza Field, Barotac Nuevo, Philippines	Bhutan	2–0	3–0	2008 AFC Challenge Cup qualification	
8	8	9 October 2010	National Stadium, Kaohsiung, Taiwan	Hong Kong	1–2‡	2–4	2010 Long Teng Cup	
9	8	9 October 2010	National Stadium, Kaohsiung, Taiwan	Hong Kong	2–2	2–4	2010 Long Teng Cup	
10	10	22 October 2010	New Laos National Stadium, Vientiane, Laos	Timor-Leste	2–0‡	5–0	2010 AFF Championship qualification	
11	11	24 October 2010	New Laos National Stadium, Vientiane, Laos	Laos	1–2‡	2–2	2010 AFF Championship qualification	
12	14	5 December 2010	Mỹ Đình National Stadium, Hanoi, Vietnam	Vietnam	2–0	2–0	2010 AFF Championship	
13	18	9 February 2011	Panaad Stadium, Bacolod, Philippines	Mongolia	2–0	2–0	2012 AFC Challenge Cup qualification	
14	21	3 July 2011	Rizal Memorial Stadium, Manila, Philippines	Sri Lanka	2–0	4–0	2014 FIFA World Cup qualification	
15	21	3 July 2011	Rizal Memorial Stadium, Manila, Philippines	Sri Lanka	4–0‡	4–0	2014 FIFA World Cup qualification	
16	24	30 September 2011	National Stadium, Kaohsiung, Taiwan	Hong Kong	1–2‡	3–3	2011 Long Teng Cup	
17	28	11 October 2011	Rizal Memorial Stadium, Manila, Philippines	Nepal	1–0	4–0	Friendly	
18	28	11 October 2011	Rizal Memorial Stadium, Manila, Philippines	Nepal	3–0	4–0	Friendly	
19	31	11 March 2012	Dasharath Rangasala, Kathmandu, Nepal	India	1–0	2–0	2012 AFC Challenge Cup	
20	31	11 March 2012	Dasharath Rangasala, Kathmandu, Nepal	India	2–0	2–0	2012 AFC Challenge Cup	
21	32	13 March 2012	Halchowk Stadium, Kathmandu	Tajikistan	1–1	2–1	2012 AFC Challenge Cup	
22	33	16 March 2012	Dasharath Rangasala, Kathmandu, Nepal	Turkmenistan	1–0	1–2	2012 AFC Challenge Cup	
23	34	19 March 2012	Dasharath Rangasala, Kathmandu, Nepal	Palestine	1–0	4–3	2012 AFC Challenge Cup	
24	34	19 March 2012	Dasharath Rangasala, Kathmandu, Nepal	Palestine	2–1‡	4–3	2012 AFC Challenge Cup	
25	35	5 June 2012	Rizal Memorial Stadium, Manila, Philippines	Indonesia	2–2	2–2	Friendly	
26	38	7 September 2012	Jurong West Stadium, Jurong West, Singapore	Singapore	2–0	2–0	Friendly	
27	39	16 October 2012	Al Kuwait Sports Club Stadium, Kuwait City, Kuwait	Kuwait	1–1‡	1–2	Friendly	
28	43	30 November 2012	Supachalasai Stadium, Bangkok, Thailand	Myanmar	1–0	2–0	2012 AFF Championship	
29	47	24 March 2013	Rizal Memorial Stadium, Manila, Philippines	Cambodia	1–0	8–0	2014 AFC Challenge Cup qualification	
30	47	24 March 2013	Rizal Memorial Stadium, Manila, Philippines	Cambodia	2–0	8–0	2014 AFC Challenge Cup qualification	
31	47	24 March 2013	Rizal Memorial Stadium, Manila, Philippines	Cambodia	3–0	8–0	2014 AFC Challenge Cup qualification	
32	47	24 March 2013	Rizal Memorial Stadium, Manila, Philippines	Cambodia	7–0	8–0	2014 AFC Challenge Cup qualification	
33	48	26 March 2013	Rizal Memorial Stadium, Manila, Philippines	Turkmenistan	1–0	1–0	2014 AFC Challenge Cup qualification	
34	53	15 November 2013	Kanchenjunga Stadium, Siliguri, India	India	1–1	1–1	Friendly	
35	58	24 May 2014	National Football Stadium, Malé, Maldives	Turkmenistan	1–0	2–0	2014 AFC Challenge Cup	
36	59	27 May 2014	National Football Stadium, Malé, Maldives	Maldives	1–0	3–2 (a.e.t.)	2014 AFC Challenge Cup	
37	62	6 September 2014	Rizal Memorial Stadium, Manila, Philippines	Myanmar	2–1‡	2–3 (a.e.t.)	2014 Philippine Peace Cup	
38	63	12 October 2014	Rizal Memorial Stadium, Manila, Philippines	Papua New Guinea	4–0	5–0	Friendly	
39	64	31 October 2014	Grand Hamad Stadium, Doha, Qatar	Nepal	2–0‡	3–0	Friendly	
40	66	14 November 2014	Rizal Memorial Stadium, Manila, Philippines	Cambodia	3–0	3–0	Friendly	
41	67	22 November 2014	Mỹ Đình National Stadium, Hanoi, Vietnam	Laos	2–1	4–1	2014 AFF Championship	
42	68	25 November 2014	Mỹ Đình National Stadium, Hanoi, Vietnam	Indonesia	1–0‡	4–0	2014 AFF Championship	
43	84	22 November 2016	Philippine Sports Stadium, Bocaue, Philippines	Indonesia	2–2	2–2	2016 AFF Championship	
44	87	28 March 2017	Rizal Memorial Stadium, Manila, Philippines	Nepal	1–0‡	4–1	2019 AFC Asian Cup qualification	
45	87	28 March 2017	Rizal Memorial Stadium, Manila, Philippines	Nepal	2–0	4–1	2019 AFC Asian Cup qualification	
46	89	13 June 2017	Pamir Stadium, Dushanbe, Tajikistan	Tajikistan	1–0	4–3	2019 AFC Asian Cup qualification	
47	90	5 September 2017	Panaad Stadium, Bacolod, Philippines	Yemen	1–1	2–2	2019 AFC Asian Cup qualification	
48	93	1 December 2017	Taipei Municipal Stadium, Taipei, Taiwan	Laos	1–0	3–1	2017 CTFA International Tournament	
49	96	22 March 2018	Rizal Memorial Stadium, Manila, Philippines	Fiji	1–0‡	3–2	Friendly	
50	97	27 March 2018	Rizal Memorial Stadium, Manila, Philippines	Tajikistan	2–1‡	2–1	2019 AFC Asian Cup qualification	
51	98	6 September 2018	Bahrain National Stadium, Riffa, Bahrain	Bahrain	1–0‡	1–1	Friendly	
52	101	17 November 2018	Kuala Lumpur Stadium, Kuala Lumpur, Malaysia	Timor-Leste	1–0	3–2	2018 AFF Championship	

== International statistics ==
Caps and goals by year
Year	Caps	Goals
2006	4	6
2007	0	0
2008	3	1
2009	0	0
2010	10	5
2011	11	6
2012	17	10
2013	8	6
2014	18	8
2015	7	0
2016	7	1
2017	10	5
2018	10	4
2019	3	0
Total	108	52

Caps and goals by competition
Competition	Caps	Goals
Friendlies (incl. minor invitational tournaments)	43	16
AFC Asian Cup	3	0
FIFA World Cup/AFC Asian Cup qualifiers	15	7
AFF Championship	24	6
AFF Championship qualifiers	7	8
AFC Challenge Cup	9	8
AFC Challenge Cup qualifiers	7	7
Total	108	52

Caps and goals by opposition
Opposition	Caps	Goals
Timor-Leste	4	6
Cambodia	5	5
Nepal	5	5
India	2	3
Hong Kong	3	3
Turkmenistan	3	3
Tajikistan	4	3
Laos	5	3
Indonesia	7	3
Brunei	2	2
Palestine	2	2
Sri Lanka	2	2
Myanmar	4	2
Bhutan	1	1
Fiji	1	1
Papua New Guinea	1	1
Maldives	2	1
Mongolia	2	1
Kuwait	3	1
Yemen	3	1
Bahrain	5	1
Vietnam	5	1
Singapore	8	1
Azerbaijan	1	0
Guam	1	0
Macau	1	0
Oman	1	0
Pakistan	1	0
South Korea	1	0
United Arab Emirates	1	0
Uzbekistan	1	0
China	2	0
Kyrgyzstan	3	0
Malaysia	3	0
North Korea	3	0
Chinese Taipei	4	0
Thailand	6	0
Total	108	52

== See also ==
- List of top international association football goal scorers by country
- List of men's footballers with 50 or more international goals
- List of footballers with 100 or more caps
