= Ángel Guirado =

Filipino footballer (born 1984)

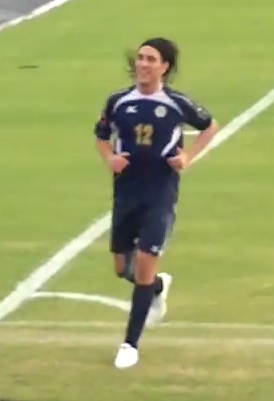
- Guirado playing for the Philippines in 2011

Personal information
- Full name: Ángel Aldeguer Guirado
- Birth name: Ángel Guirado Aldeguer
- Date of birth: 9 December 1984 (age 41)
- Place of birth: Málaga, Spain
- Height: 1.91 m (6 ft 3 in)
- Position: Forward

Youth career
- Málaga
- –2002: El Palo
- 2002–2003: Mataró

Senior career*
Years	Team	Apps	(Gls)
2003	Mataró		
2003	Manresa		
2003–2005	Córdoba B		
2004–2006	Córdoba	18	(0)
2006	→ Atlético Madrid B (loan)	16	(1)
2006–2007	Deportivo La Coruña	0	(0)
2006	→ Vecindario (loan)	1	(0)
2007	→ Lugo (loan)	16	(0)
2007–2008	Levante B	33	(2)
2008–2009	Santa Eulàlia	16	(0)
2009–2010	Estepona	16	(2)
2010	El Palo	5	(0)
2010–2011	Ronda	24	(4)
2011–2012	Global		
2012	Salgaocar	5	(2)
2013	Olímpic Xàtiva	7	(2)
2013–2014	Global	15	(6)
2015	Udon Thani	5	(1)
2015	Grindavik	7	(5)
2015	San Pedro	10	(5)
2016	Udon Thani	3	(2)
2016	Lincoln Red Imps	10	(3)
2017	Palazzolo		
2017	St Joseph's	0	(0)
2017–2018	Davao Aguilas		
2018–2019	Negeri Sembilan	12	(2)
2019–2020	Chonburi	5	(2)
2020–2021	St Joseph's	11	(5)
2021–2022	Alhaurín de la Torre	15	(0)
Total		250	(39)

International career
2011–2021	Philippines	46	(13)
- * Club domestic league appearances and goals

Ángel Aldeguer Guirado (born 9 December 1984) is a former professional footballer who played as a forward. He represented the Philippines at senior level.

His professional career in Spain consisted of ten Segunda División matches for Córdoba and Vecindario. He went on to appear for teams in the Philippines, India, Thailand, Iceland, Gibraltar, Italy and Malaysia.

== Club career ==
Born in Málaga, Andalusia, Guirado was an unsuccessful youth graduate at hometown club Málaga CF, going to play for two other clubs before completing his development. He started his senior career in 2003 with CE Mataró (preseason games only), moving to Catalonia neighbours CE Manresa in Tercera División shortly after and returning to his native region after the year was over, signing for Córdoba CF in Segunda División. During his spell in that tier he appeared in only nine games (out of 42) as the 2004–05 season ended in relegation, and represented mainly the B side in both the fourth division and the regional leagues.

Following a brief loan spell with Atlético Madrid B in Segunda División B, Guirado joined Deportivo de La Coruña for €50.000, but only appeared officially for the reserves, also being loaned twice during the 2006–07 campaign, playing a combined 17 matches for UD Vecindario (second level) and CD Lugo (third). He spent the following three seasons in division three with as many teams, being relegated twice.

Guirado signed for fourth-tier club CD Ronda in early October 2010. However, in the summer of 2011, he decided not to renew his contract in order to explore other possibilities, with scouts from China, Indonesia, Japan and the United Arab Emirates following his progress.

On 13 August 2011, Guirado agreed to a deal with Global Cebu F.C. in the Philippines. He was sent off in his first match against Philippine Army FC, and scored his first goal on 30 January 2012 in a 5–1 win over Manila Nomads FC.

Guirado joined I-League side Salgaocar F.C. on 17 August 2012. His one-year contract was terminated before the end of the year, due to poor performances and prolonged national team duties. He made eight appearances and scored three goals during his tenure, between the league and the Federation Cup.

In January 2015, Guirado moved to Udon Thani F.C. in the Thai Regional League Division 2. Seven months later, he signed for Icelandic club Knattspyrnudeild UMFG.

In late January 2017, Guirado signed with Italian amateurs A.C. Palazzolo. In May of the following year, he joined Malaysia Super League side Negeri Sembilan FA.

== International career ==
On 26 February 2011, it was reported that Guirado would join the Philippines national team due to his ancestry. He made his debut in the 1–1 draw against Myanmar on 21 March, in the 2012 AFC Challenge Cup qualification tournament.

On his third appearance, for the same competition, Guirado scored two goals in the second half of the 3–0 away win against Bangladesh. In November 2017, after a four-year absence, he was recalled to the national team and included in the squad for the 2017 CTFA International Tournament in Taiwan, netting once in the 3–1 victory over Laos.

=== International goals ===
As of 11 December 2021 (Philippines score listed first, score column indicates score after each Guirado goal)

#	Date	Venue	Opponent	Score	Result	Competition
2011
1.	25 March 2011	Bogyoke Aung San, Yangon, Myanmar	Bangladesh	2–0	3–0	2012 AFC Challenge Cup qualification
2.	25 March 2011	Bogyoke Aung San, Yangon, Myanmar	Bangladesh	3–0	3–0	2012 AFC Challenge Cup qualification
3.	3 July 2011	Rizal Memorial Stadium, Manila, Philippines	Sri Lanka	3–0	4–0	2014 FIFA World Cup qualification
2012
4.	13 March 2012	Halchowk Stadium, Kathmandu, Nepal	Tajikistan	2–1	2–1	2012 AFC Challenge Cup
5.	19 March 2012	Dasarath Rangasala, Kathmandu, Nepal	Palestine	3–1	4–3	2012 AFC Challenge Cup
6.	12 June 2012	Panaad Stadium, Bacolod, Philippines	Guam	1–0	3–0	Friendly
7.	12 June 2012	Panaad Stadium, Bacolod, Philippines	Guam	3–0	3–0	Friendly
8.	30 November 2012	Supachalasai, Bangkok, Thailand	Myanmar	2–0	2–0	2012 AFF Championship
2017
9.	1 December 2017	Municipal Stadium, Taipei, Taiwan	Laos	2–0	3–1	2017 CTFA International Tournament
2019
10.	10 September 2019	National Training Center, Dededo, Guam	Guam	1–0	4–1	2022 FIFA World Cup qualification
2021
11.	11 June 2021	Sharjah Stadium, Sharjah, United Arab Emirates	Guam	1–0	3–0	2022 FIFA World Cup qualification
12.	15 June 2021	Sharjah Stadium, Sharjah, United Arab Emirates	Maldives	1–0	1–1	2022 FIFA World Cup qualification
13.	11 December 2021	National Stadium, Kallang, Singapore	Timor-Leste	3–0	7–0	2020 AFF Championship

== Personal life ==
Born to a Filipina mother who hailed from Ilagan, Isabela, Guirado started playing football when he was six years old. He was a cousin of Caloy Garcia, a Filipino basketball assistant coach (including with the Rain or Shine Elasto Painters in the Philippine Basketball Association), and was also a distant uncle of ABS-CBN star model and actress Coleen Garcia.

Guirado's older brother, Juan Luis, was also a footballer. A defender, he spent most of his career in amateur football, appearing in 104 games in the third division for six teams, and also represented the Philippines internationally.

== Honours ==
=== Club ===
Global

- UFL Division 1: 2012

=== International ===
Philippines

- Philippine Peace Cup: 2013
- AFC Challenge Cup third place: 2012
