= Philippines national football team results =

This article details the international fixtures and results of the Philippines national football team.
