= Michael Weiß (football manager) =

German football manager

- Weiß in 2023

Personal information
- Full name: Hans Michael Weiß
- Date of birth: 11 March 1965 (age 61)
- Place of birth: Dannenfels, West Germany
- Position: Goalkeeper

Senior career*
Years	Team	Apps	(Gls)
- FK Pirmasens

Managerial career
- 2001–2004: Kyoto Purple Sanga (assistant)
- 2004–2006: China U20 (assistant)
- 2007–2010: Rwanda (technical director)
- 2007–2010: Rwanda U20
- 2011: Philippines U23
- 2011–2014: Philippines
- 2014: Oțelul Galați
- 2017–2020: Mongolia
- 2017–2020: Mongolia U23
- 2022–2023: Laos
- 2022–2023: Laos U23
- 2022–2023: Laos U19
- 2023–2024: Philippines
- 2024–2025: One Taguig (technical director)
- 2025: Kunming City
Medal record
Men's football
Representing Philippines (as manager)
AFC Challenge Cup
Bronze medal – third place	2012 Nepal
- * Club domestic league appearances and goals

Hans Michael Weiß (born 11 March 1965) is a German football manager.

== Managerial career ==
Weiß served internships with several football clubs around the globe such as Real Madrid, Arsenal, Kaiserslautern, and River Plate, to name a few.

He has worked at the Rwanda youth team programs and served as the technical director of the Rwandese Association Football Federation, the governing body of football in Rwanda.

In January 2011, he took charge of the Philippines national football team after being referred by the German Football Association in January 2011. Under him, the Azkals rose to their highest-ever placing in the FIFA rankings, 127 (which was later surpassed, 124 under new coach Thomas Dooley). On 15 January 2014, the Philippine Football Federation officially announced that his services had been discontinued.

In April 2014 it was announced that he was part of an 8-man shortlist to replace Eric Nshimiyimana as Rwanda manager.

In June 2014, he took the control of Romanian former champions Oțelul Galați. He was sacked only three months later after a single win in seven games.

On 18 January 2017 it was reported that Weiß was appointed by the Mongolia national football team as their head coach during a meeting of the Executive Committee of the Mongolian Football Federation on 17 January. Weiß formally accepted the 1-year deal on 27 March 2017. He immediately began preparations to lead the national under-23 team in 2018 AFC U-23 Championship qualification.

After three years, he departed from the coaching position of Mongolia, where he earned respect for his supporting role on developing Mongolian football.

In June 2023, Weiß returned as coach of the Philippines. His second tenure ended with the appointment of Tom Saintfiet in February 2024.

== Statistics ==
=== Managerial ===
As of 31 December 2013.

Nat	Team	from	to	Record				
Nat	Team	from	to	Games	Wins	Draws	Losses	Win %
(Philippines)	Philippines	January 2011	December 2014	44	21	11	12	47.73
(Laos)	Laos	7 January 2022	5 June 2023	4	2	0	2	50.00
Total				48	23	11	14	47.92

== Honors ==
Philippines

- AFC Challenge Cup third place: 2012
- Philippine Peace Cup: 2012, 2013
