= Barae Jrondi =

Moroccan football coach

Managerial career
- Years: Team
- 2023: Philippines

Barae Jrondi (Arabic: براء جروندي;) is a Moroccan football coach based in Qatar. He coached the Philippines national team briefly in 2023, in 2026 He coaching the Moghreb Atletico Tetuan.

== Career ==
=== Early roles in Qatar ===
Jrondi worked in football development and coach education in Qatar. Philippine media reported he served as an instructor in the Qatar Football Association's coach-education setup and as a technical supervisor for clubs under the federation. He was also involved at Lusail SC as an assistant coach and team analyst, and founded the developmental side Al Dafna FC. He is a holder of UEFA coaching license.

=== Philippines national team ===
On 21 March 2023, the Philippine Football Federation announced Jrondi as the new head coach for the Philippines national team ahead of a training camp in West Asia, with friendlies scheduled against Kuwait and Jordan. Jrondi signed a multi-year contract with the PFF to "provide stability" for the national team program. The Philippines lost 2–0 to Kuwait on 24 March and 4–0 to Jordan on 28 March in the FIFA international window. By May 2023, Jrondi is no longer head coach. In June 2023, Michael Weiß was brought in as Jrondi's successor.

== Managerial statistics ==
As of 28 March 2023

Managerial record by team and tenure
Team	From	To	Record							
Team	From	To	M	W	D	L	GF	GA	GD	Win %
Philippines	21 March 2023	28 March 2023	2	0	0	2	0	6	−6	0.00
Total			2	0	0	2	0	6	−6	0.00
