= André Leipold =

Filipino footballer (born 2001)

Personal information
- Date of birth: 12 November 2001 (age 24)
- Place of birth: Altötting, Germany
- Height: 1.81 m (5 ft 11 in)
- Position: Forward

Team information
- Current team: SC Verl (on loan from Pardubice)
- Number: 20

Youth career
- TV Altötting
- 2010–2013: Red Bull Salzburg
- 2013–2014: Bayern Munich
- 2014–2018: SpVgg Unterhaching
- 2014–2018: DFI Bad Aibling
- 2018–2020: Wacker Burghausen

Senior career*
Years	Team	Apps	(Gls)
2020–2022	Wacker Burghausen	23	(9)
2022–2023	Darmstadt 98	5	(0)
2023	→ Würzburger Kickers (loan)	15	(0)
2023–2024	SV Lafnitz	30	(13)
2024–	Pardubice	24	(1)
2025–2026	→ Helmond Sport (loan)	30	(0)
2026–	→ SC Verl (loan)	7	(1)

International career^{‡}
2025–	Philippines	10	(3)
- * Club domestic league appearances and goals as of 18 September 2026 ‡ National team caps and goals as of 5 October 2026

André Leipold (born 12 November 2001) is a professional footballer who plays as a forward for 3. Liga club SC Verl, on loan from Czech First League club Pardubice. Born in Germany, he plays for the Philippines national team.

== Club career ==
Leipold is a youth product of TV Altötting, Red Bull Salzburg, Bayern Munich, SpVgg Unterhaching, DFI Bad Aibling, and Wacker Burghausen. A street footballer in his youth, he began his senior career with Wacker Burghausen in the Regionalliga, where he scored 9 goals in 23 games. This earned him a transfer to Darmstadt 98 in January 2022, where he signed a professional contract until 2025. He made his professional debut with Darmstadt as a 60th-minute substitute in a 3–1 tie with 1. FC Nürnberg in the 2. Bundesliga on 9 April 2022, where he scored an own goal in extra time.

On 10 January 2023, Leipold was loaned by Würzburger Kickers.

On 13 July 2023, Darmstadt announced Leipold's transfer to SV Lafnitz in Austria.

On 12 July 2024, Leipold signed a contract with Czech First League club Pardubice.

On 5 August 2025, Leipold joined Dutch Eerste Divisie club Helmond Sport on a one-year loan deal with option to buy.

On 23 July 2026, Leipold returned to Germany and signed with SC Verl in 3. Liga.

== International career ==
=== Philippines ===
In 2024, it was reported that Leipold was among the heritage players being recruited by the Philippines.

On 27 May 2025, Leipold was included in the 24-man squad of the Philippines for the 2027 AFC Asian Cup qualification match against Tajikistan.

On June 3, 2026, Leipold scored his first two international goals in the 5–1 win over Guam in a friendly at the Rizal Memorial Stadium.

Scores and results list the Philippines' goal tally first.

#	Date	Venue	Opponent	Score	Result	Competition
1.	3 June 2026	Rizal Memorial Stadium, Manila, Philippines	Guam	4–1	5–1	Friendly
2.	3 June 2026	Rizal Memorial Stadium, Manila, Philippines	Guam	5–1	5–1	Friendly
3.	9 June 2026	Rizal Memorial Stadium, Manila, Philippines	Myanmar	4–1	5–1	Friendly
