= Carlos Cavagnaro =

Argentine football manager

Personal information
- Full name: Carlos Alberto Cavagnaro
- Date of birth: 9 April 1946 (age 80)
- Place of birth: Necochea, Argentina

Youth career
- Years: Team
- Vélez Sársfield

Managerial career
- 1969: Argentinos Juniors
- 1969: Vélez Sársfield
- 1970–1971: UNAM Pumas
- 1972: Ferro Carril Oeste
- 1973–1974: Circulo Italiano Atletico Regina
- 1975: Atlante
- 1976: Guatemala
- 1977–1978: Vélez Sársfield
- 1979–1980: Racing Club
- 1981: Unión de Santa Fe
- 1982: Racing Club
- 1983: Guatemala
- 1984: Panama
- 1985: Platense
- 1986–1987: Grenada
- 1988: St Kitts and Nevis
- 1989: Philippines
- Defensores de Belgrano
- El Porvenir
- 1988: Chacarita Juniors
- 1987–1988: Universidad
- 2005–2006: El Salvador
- 2007: V.B. Sport

Carlos Albert Cavagnaro (born 9 April 1946 in Necochea, Buenos Aires) is an Argentine football manager. He became the youngest football manager in the history of the Argentine Primera when he took charge of Argentinos Juniors in 1969 aged 22.

== Career ==
=== Playing ===
Cavagnaro was a youth player with Vélez Sársfield in his native Argentina, but suffered an injury that forced him to retire.

=== Coaching ===
Cavagnaro has coached ten Argentine teams, including Argentinos Juniors, Vélez Sársfield, Ferro Carril Oeste, Racing Club, Unión de Santa Fe and Platense in the Argentine Primera. He has also worked in Mexico where he was coach of UNAM Pumas and Atlante.

He has also coached many national teams in the CONCACAF region, these include Guatemala (twice), Panama, Grenada, St Kitts and Nevis and El Salvador.

Cavagnaro has also worked in Asia. He became the head coach of the Philippines national team in 1989, and in 2007 he worked as the coach of VB Sports Club of the Maldives.
