= Football at the 1986 Brunei Merdeka Games =

Tournament details
- Host country: Brunei
- Dates: 19 July – 27 July
- Teams: 10

Final positions
- Champions: (Indonesia) Persib Bandung (1st title)
- Runners-up: Malaysia B
- Third place: Brunei
- Fourth place: Singapore XI

Tournament statistics
- Matches played: 10
- Goals scored: 25 (2.5 per match)

The football tournament at the 1986 Brunei Merdeka Games was held from July 19 to 27 in Bandar Seri Begawan, Brunei. The tournament was also referred to as the Sultan Hassanal Bolkiah Cup, or the second Brunei Pesta Sukan Cup.

== Teams ==
It is likely that the Philippines team was the full national team, but it is unknown. the Malaysian Tigers was a developmental team of young players, functioning as a national B team. The precise designation of the Thai team is unknown, but it was not the full Thailand national team (which was at the Merdeka Tournament in Kuala Lumpur). The Singapore team was composed of Malaysia Cup and intermediate squad players. However, the Singapore 2–0 Thailand match is listed by FIFA as a full international. No other match from this tournament is listed as such.

== Group stage ==
=== Group A ===
Team	Pld	W	D	L	GF	GA	GD	Pts
(Indonesia) Persib Bandung	2	2	0	0	6	1	+5	4
Brunei	2	1	0	1	3	3	0	2
Philippines	2	0	0	2	1	6	−5	0

20.07.1986

Brunei	2 – 1	Philippines

Bandar Seri Begawan

22.07.1986

Persib Bandung (Indonesia)	4 – 0	Philippines

Bandar Seri Begawan

24.07.1986

Brunei	1 – 2	(Indonesia) Persib Bandung

Bandar Seri Begawan

=== Group B ===
Team	Pld	W	D	L	GF	GA	GD	Pts
Malaysia B	2	2	0	0	4	0	+4	4
Singapore XI	2	1	0	1	2	1	+1	2
Thailand XI	2	0	0	2	0	5	−5	0

19.07.1986

Malaysia B	3 – 0	Thailand XI

Bandar Seri Begawan

21.07.1986

Malaysia B	1 – 0	Singapore XI

Bandar Seri Begawan

23.07.1986

Singapore XI	2 – 0	Thailand XI

Bandar Seri Begawan

== Knockout stage ==
=== Semi-finals ===
25.07.1986

Persib Bandung (Indonesia)	0 – 0	Singapore XI
Penalties
	4 – 2

Bandar Seri Begawan

25.07.1986

Malaysia B	2 – 1	Brunei

Bandar Seri Begawan

=== Bronze medal match ===
26.07.1986

Brunei	3 – 2	Singapore XI

Bandar Seri Begawan

=== Gold medal match ===
27.07.1986

Persib Bandung (Indonesia)	1 – 0	Malaysia B
Yusuf Bachtiar 47'

Bandar Seri Begawan
