= Philippines national football team =

Philippines
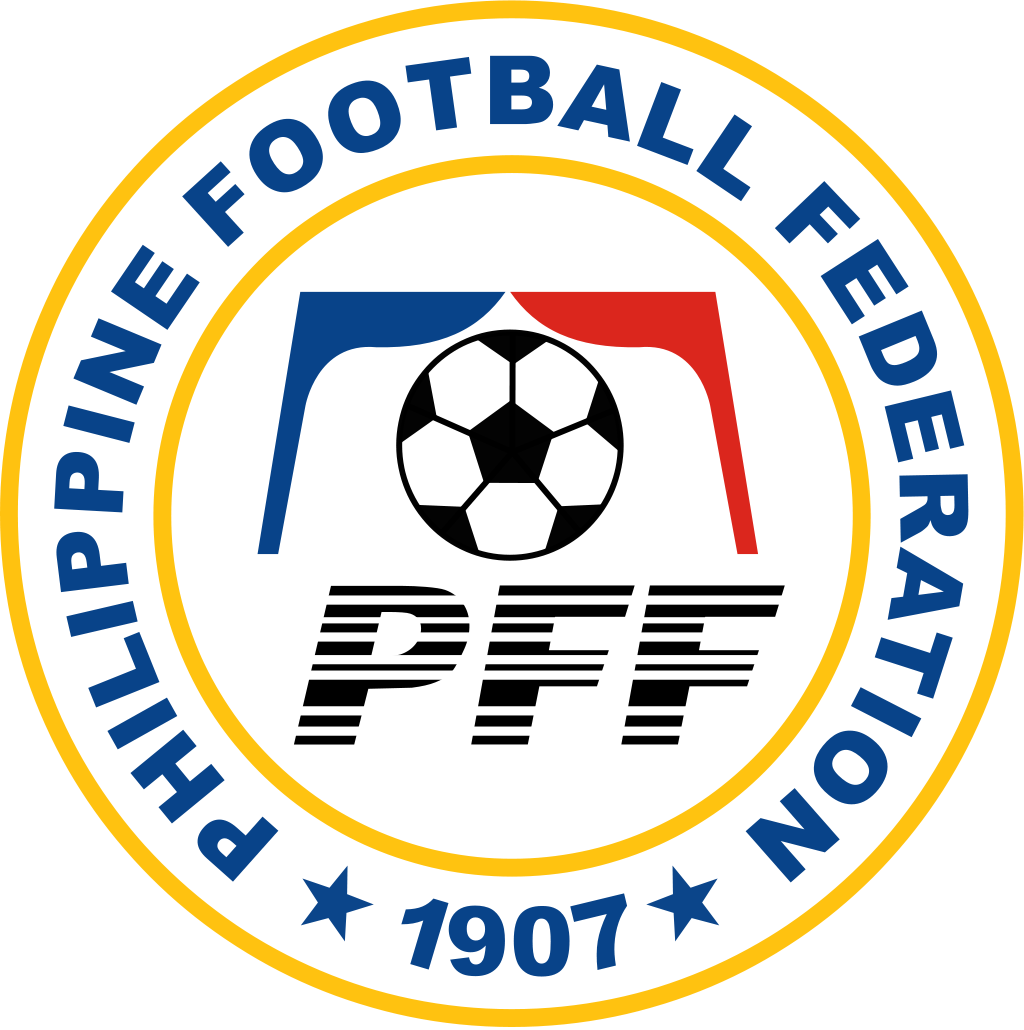
- Nickname: Azkals
- Association: Philippine Football Federation (PFF)
- Confederation: AFC (Asia)
- Sub-confederation: AFF (Southeast Asia)
- Head coach: Carles Cuadrat
- Captain: Manny Ott
- Most caps: Phil Younghusband (108)
- Top scorer: Phil Younghusband (52)
- Home stadium: Rizal Memorial Stadium
- FIFA code: PHI
First colors	Second colors

FIFA ranking
- Current: 135 ▲1 (November 18, 2026)
- Highest: 111 (May 2018)
- Lowest: 195 (September – October 2006)

First international
- Philippines 2–1 China (Manila, Philippines; February 4, 1913)

Biggest win
- Japan 2–15 Philippines (Tokyo, Japan; May 10, 1917)

Biggest defeat
- Japan 15–0 Philippines (Tokyo, Japan; September 28, 1967)

Asian Cup
- Appearances: 1 (first in 2019)
- Best result: Group stage (2019)

AFC Challenge Cup
- Appearances: 3 (first in 2006)
- Best result: Runners-up (2014)

ASEAN Championship
- Appearances: 15 (first in 1996)
- Best result: Semi-finals (2010, 2012, 2014, 2018, 2024)

ASEAN Cup
- Appearances: 1 (first in 2026)
- Best result: Group stage (2026)
Medal record
Men's association football
Representing Philippines
AFC Challenge Cup
Silver medal – second place	2014 Maldives	Team
Bronze medal – third place	2012 Nepal	Team

The Philippines national football team (Filipino: Pambansang koponan ng futbol ng Pilipinas) represents the Philippines in men's international football, governed by the Philippine Football Federation (PFF) and has been playing internationally since 1913.

Prior to World War II, the Philippines had regularly competed with Japan and the Republic of China in the Far Eastern Championship Games. So far, the national team has never qualified for the FIFA World Cup and has qualified for the AFC Asian Cup only once, in 2019. They finished second at the 2014 AFC Challenge Cup after losing to Palestine in the final.

Unlike most of Southeast Asia, where football is the most popular sport, the Philippines' most popular sports are basketball and boxing, inherited from American rule. Before 2010, the Philippines suffered group stage eliminations at the AFF Championship. However, since the 2010 AFF Championship, which saw the "Miracle of Hanoi", the country has attempted to develop football as part of the sport's renaissance, finding more incentives to increase football development and fan support.

== History ==
=== 1910s–1940s: Early years ===
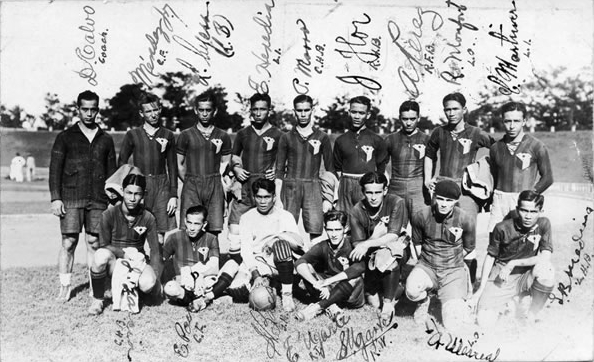
The national team squad at the 1930 Far Eastern Championship Games.

The Philippines participated in the Far Eastern Championship Games, which included football. The first edition was in 1913 and the last was in 1934. The games were the first regional football tournament for national teams outside the British Home Championship. The national team routinely faced Japan and China and at one edition the Dutch East Indies at the games. The Philippines won over China at the inaugural tournament with a scoreline of 2–1. During the 1917 edition, the national team achieved its biggest win in international football. Led by Filipino-Spanish icon Paulino Alcantara, the Philippines defeated Japan 15–2.

After the dissolution of the Far Eastern Championship Games, the national squad participated in the 1940 East Asian Games organized to commemorate the 2600th anniversary of the foundation of the Empire of Japan by Emperor Jimmu. The team finished third behind champions Japan and second placers Manchukuo, and ahead of the Republic of China.

=== 1950s–1990s: Decline of football ===
In the 1950s the Philippines hosted friendlies with international-based sides, however, the national team experienced lack of funding and barely received any coverage from the media. During that time talents from the national team were drawn from the Manila Football League which received substantial support from the Chinese-Filipino community. The national team's decent performance at the 1958 Asian Games, hosted in Tokyo, where they defeated Japan 1–0, was labeled as an upset by the Japanese press.

The years following 1958 saw the decline of Philippine football, as several key players resigned from the national team due to financial challenges for playing. National team players Ed Ocampo and Eduardo Pacheco switched to basketball, and went on playing for commercial basketball clubs where players are paid. The Philippine Congress passed Republic Act 3135 that revised the charter of the Philippine Amateur Athletic Federation, which had a provision, or a 60-40 rule, that mandated teams to not have more than 40 percent Chinese and other players with foreign blood. Sponsors withdrew and leagues, which were mostly funded by the Chinese-Filipino community, started to decline. The 60–40 rule was lifted much later during the tenure of president Johnny Romualdez of the Philippine Football Federation (PFF), after 1982 when the PFA had reorganized itself as the PFF.

The national team suffered defeats with big margins at the 1962 Asian Games in Jakarta. This includes the national team's record 15–1 defeat to Malaysia, which became the worst defeat of the national team at that time. The record was later broken by the 15–0 loss to Japan in 1967 at the qualifiers for the 1968 Summer Olympics. Foreigners were hired to serve as head coaches for the national team in an attempt to reduce big margin loses. Englishman Allan Rogers was hired following the record defeat to Malaysia, and Spaniard Juan Cutillas was likewise tasked to lead the national team following the record defeat to Japan.

In the early sixties, the Philippine Football Association partnered with the San Miguel Corporation to seek foreign assistance to train local football players and coaches and to develop the sport in the country. These included Alan Rogers and Brian Birch, coaches from the United Kingdom. After the two were relieved, Danny McClellan and Graham Adams continued their task. In 1961, San Miguel, through the national football association, brought in four medical students from Spain who were experts in football — Francisco Escarte, Enrique dela Mata, Claudio Sanchez and Juan Cutillas. Escarte and dela Mata left the country after one year.

In 1971, head coach Juan Cutillas recruited five foreign players to play for the national team: four Spaniards and one Chinese. The national team joined several international competitions such as the Merdeka Tournament, Jakarta Anniversary Tournament and the President Park Tournament. The team caused some upset results against the national teams of Thailand, Singapore and South Korea. The national team saw another decline after the four Spanish players left the team due to financial reasons and basketball gained more foothold over football in the country.

The national team under German head coach Eckhard Krautzun finished fourth overall at the 1991 Southeast Asian Games, its best ever finish at the tournament. The Philippines dealt a 1–0 defeat to defending champions Malaysia at the tournament which knocked out the latter out of the tournament at just the group stage. Norman Fegidero scored the sole goal for the Philippines.

=== 2000s ===
In September 2006, the country fell to 195th on the FIFA World Rankings, its lowest ever. By the end of the year, the Philippines moved back up to 171st overall, after a good run in the 2007 AFF Championship qualification. They were able to win three games in a row, which was a first for the Philippines and thus qualifying for the 2007 AFF Championship. Coach at that time Aris Caslib, aimed to reach the semifinals with two wins at the group stage. The decision came despite Philippine Football Federation president Juan Miguel Romualdez stating that they would still be underdogs in the tournament and that they should not raise their expectations too high, as the Philippines have only gotten their first ever win of the tournament during the 2004 AFF Championship.

The Philippines eventually failed to reach their target, only getting a draw in three matches. Their poor performances led to Caslib's resignation, as well as the refusal of the PFF to register and enter the qualification stages for the 2010 FIFA World Cup. They would be one of four nations, all from Southeast Asia, not to enter after a record number of entries. However, it was revealed that the decision not to enter the 2010, as well as the 2006 World Cup qualification, was made during the PFF presidency of Rene Adad, whose term ended in 2003. Instead, the PFF wanted to focus on domestic and regional competitions.

The Philippines failed to qualify for any major competition in 2008. They missed out on the 2008 AFC Challenge Cup only on goal difference, and the 2008 AFF Championship with an inferior goals scored record.

Dan Palami, businessman and sports patron, was appointed as team manager of the national team in 2009 by the Philippine Football Federation. The national team still received minimal support from the government. Palami made financial investments into the team using his own personal money. Since taking responsibility over the national team, he envisioned a plan named Project 100, which aimed to make the team among the top 100 national teams in the world in terms of FIFA rankings. More foreign-born Filipinos were called up to play for the national squad.

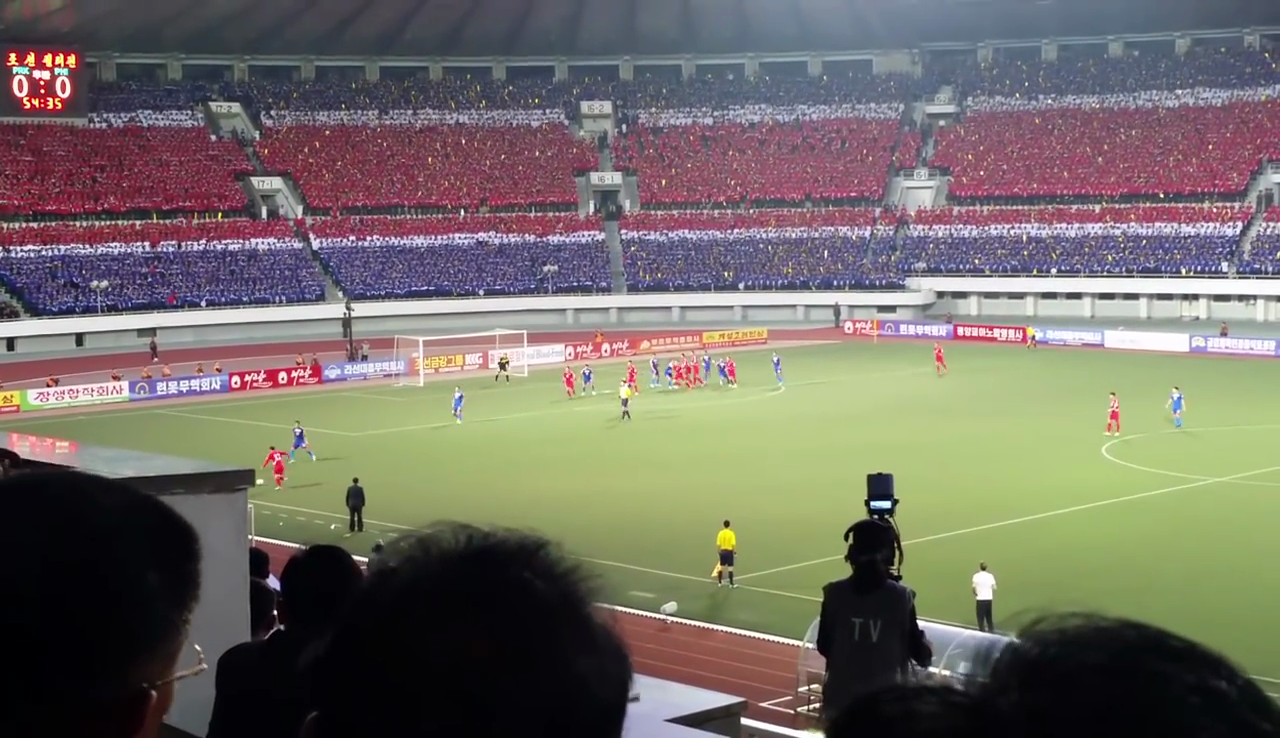
The national team (in blue) playing against North Korea (in red) at the Kim Il-sung Stadium in Pyongyang. The 2018 FIFA World Cup qualifier match held on October 8, 2015, ended in a goalless draw

=== 2010s: Era of renaissance ===
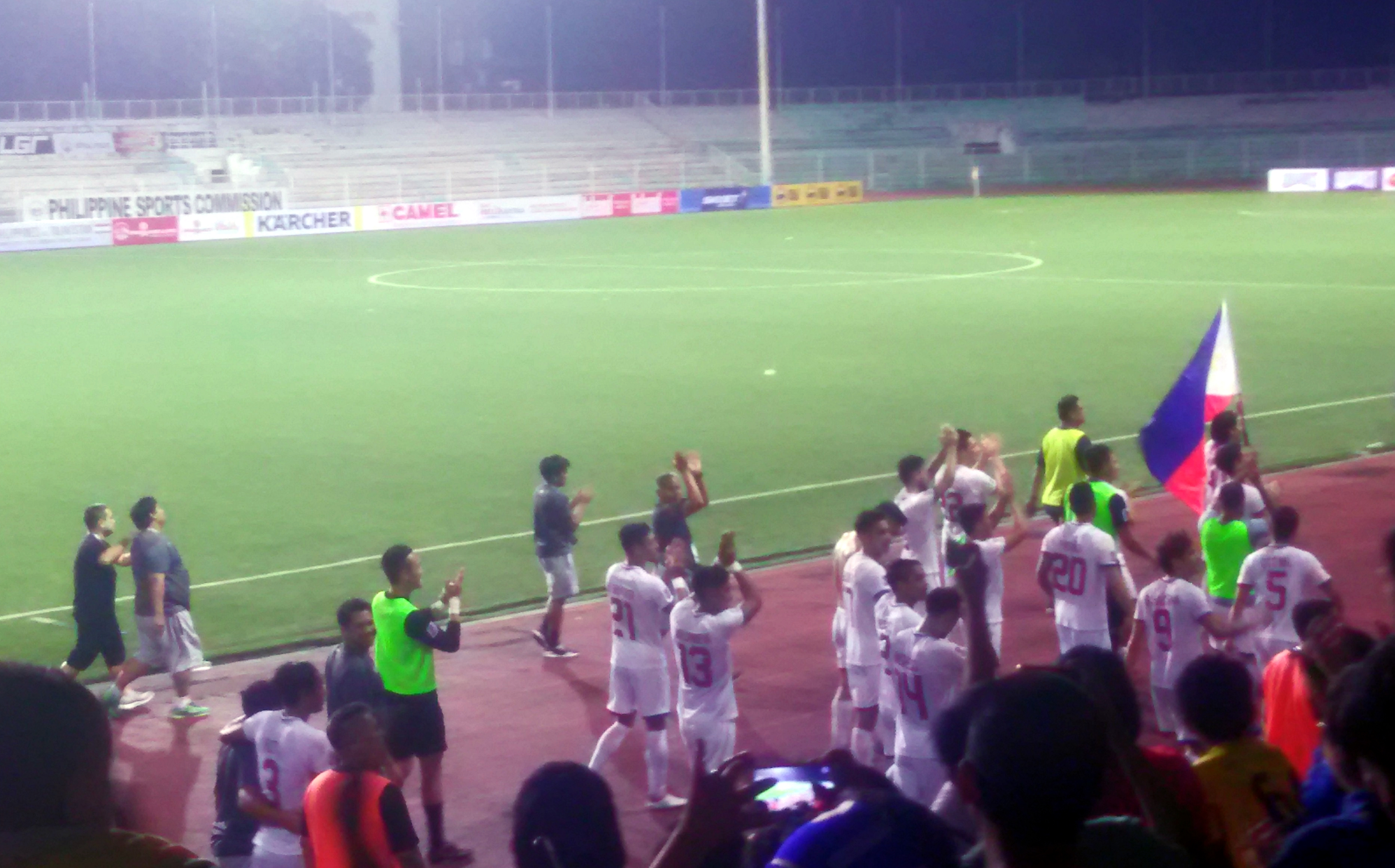
Players of the national team celebrating their first qualification ever for the AFC Asian Cup following their 2–1 win over Tajikistan on March 27, 2018

The Philippines's campaign at the 2010 AFF Championship under Simon McMenemy's tenure was a breakthrough. Holding a primal ticket as one of two teams along with Laos that had to qualify for the tournament, the Philippines advanced from the group stage for the first time, did not concede a single defeat, and their win against defending champions Vietnam in particular was considered one of the biggest upsets in the tournament's history. The match, which would later be referred by local Filipino fans as the "Miracle of Hanoi", is also considered the match that started a football renaissance in the country where basketball is the more popular sport. In the knockout stage, they had to play both their designated home and away games against Indonesia in Jakarta due to the unavailability of a stadium that passes AFF standards. The Philippines lost both games to end their campaign.

The following year, Michael Weiß became the head coach. The national team managed to qualify for the 2012 edition of the AFC Challenge Cup, the first time since qualifiers were introduced and also recorded their first ever victory in the FIFA World Cup qualification, beating Sri Lanka 4–0 in the second leg of the first preliminary round. Kuwait finished the Philippines' World Cup qualification campaign after winning over them twice in the second round.

In 2012, the Philippines qualified for the semifinals of the AFC Challenge Cup for the first time winning over former champions India and Tajikistan, though they lost 2–1 against Turkmenistan in the semifinal. In the third place-playoff the Philippines won 4–3 over Palestine. The Philippines won the 2012 Philippine Peace Cup, a friendly tournament hosted at home, which was their first title since the 1913 Far Eastern Games. At the 2012 AFF Championship, the Philippines replicated their performance in 2010 by advancing to the semifinal. They lost to Singapore on aggregate by a single goal in the two-legged semifinal.

The starting lineup of the Azkals in their first-ever AFC Asian Cup match, against the South Korea during the 2019 AFC Asian Cup.

The Philippines reached the final of the 2014 AFC Challenge Cup. With a berth to the 2015 AFC Asian Cup on the line, the Philippines lost to Palestine 1–0 on May 30. The Philippines once again advanced from the group stage at the 2014 AFF Championship by winning over Indonesia, the first time since the 1934 Far Eastern Games, and Laos despite their loss to Vietnam. The Philippines faced Thailand in the two-legged semifinal, coming up with a goalless draw against their opponents at home in Manila but losing the away match at Bangkok.

Thomas Dooley became the head coach of the national team. In October 2015 their 2–0 victory over Yemen in Doha, Qatar in the 2018 FIFA World Cup and 2019 AFC Asian Cup qualifiers was their first-ever World Cup qualifier victory away from home. Their campaign to qualify for the FIFA World Cup ended in the second round though they advance to the third round of the Asian Cup qualifiers.

In late 2016 the Philippines jointly hosted the group stage of the AFF Championship with Myanmar though they fail to progress from the group stage like they did in the past three editions.

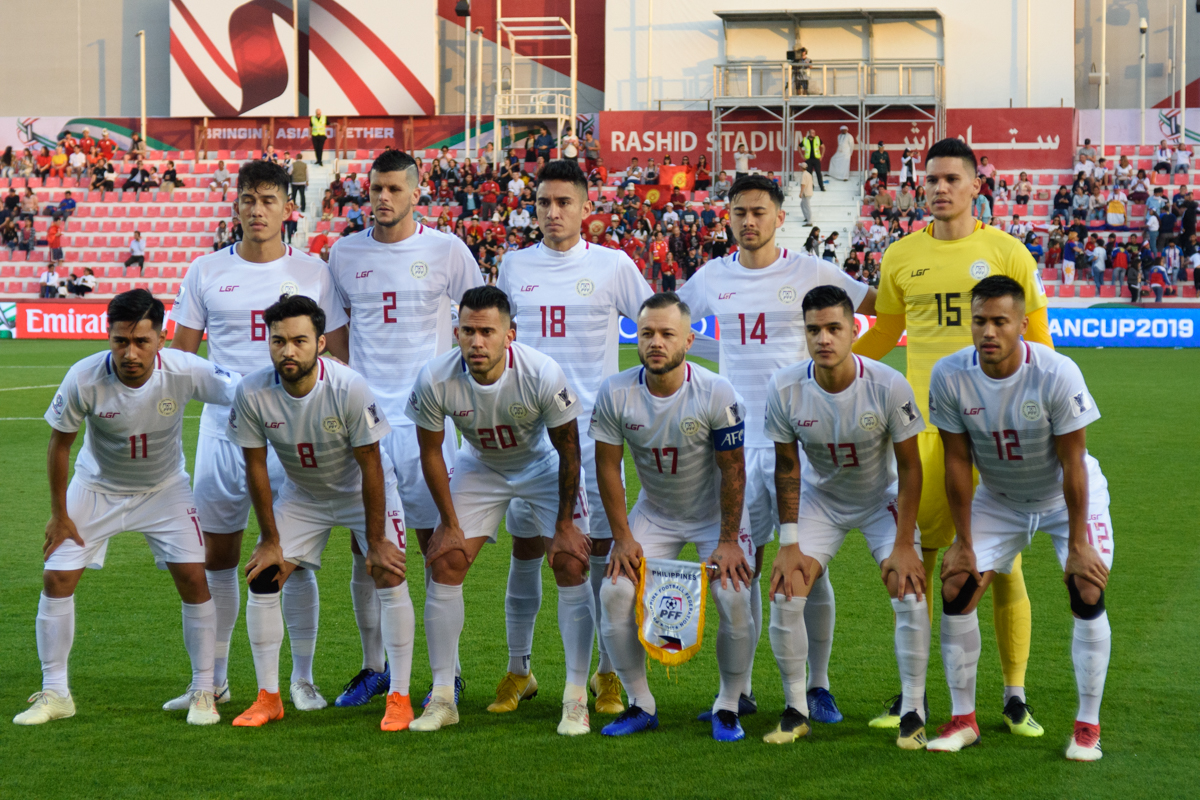
Philippines in their debut tournament at the 2019 AFC Asian Cup.

Though the national team failed to qualify for the 2018 FIFA World Cup in Russia, they secured qualification for 2019 AFC Asian Cup after defeating Tajikistan, 2–1 at home in their final qualifier match. In May 2018, the national team reached 111th rank in the FIFA World Ranking making it the highest rank that the team has.

The Philippines made its historic debut in the 2019 AFC Asian Cup with a 0–1 defeat to South Korea. then a 0–3 loss to China and was edged 1–3 by Kyrgyzstan, with Stephan Schröck scoring a historic goal for the Azkals in the tournament.

=== 2020–present ===
Following a relatively successful debut in the Asian Cup, the Philippines began their 2022 FIFA World Cup qualification where they were grouped together with Syria, China, Guam and Maldives. In their opening game, the Azkals met Syria at home and took an early lead, only to see the Syrians manage an outstanding comeback and smash the Azkals 5–2 in Bacolod. Following the crushing home defeat, the Pinoys regained its pace with two away wins over Guam and the Maldives. Between these matches, the Pinoys also hosted China at home where they acquired an encouraging goalless draw, after a splendid performance by the Azkals goalkeeper Neil Etheridge which increased the team's chance. However, the Syrians once again defeated the Azkals 1–0 on the return fixture. When COVID-19 pandemic led the games to be postponed to 2021, the Philippines had to play in a centralised venue in Sharjah. The Filipinos then won against Guam 3–0, but lost 0–2 to China and thus did not manage to reach the 2022 FIFA World Cup, before ending the qualification with a 1–1 draw to the Maldives. Nonetheless, the third place in their group meant the Philippines qualified for the third round of 2023 AFC Asian Cup qualifiers.

At the third round of the 2023 AFC Asian Cup qualifiers in Ulaanbaatar, the Philippines managed to draw with Yemen 0–0 and defeat the hosts Mongolia 1–0 through a last-minute goal by debutant Gerrit Holtmann but were defeated 4–0 by eventual group winners Palestine. Despite finishing second in Group B, in which the five best runner-up teams across all the groups qualify for the tournament, the Azkals failed to qualify for the 2023 AFC Asian Cup after finishing as the worst runner-up.

Philippines then played in the second round of the 2026 FIFA World Cup qualification being placed alongside Iraq and two regional rivals, Indonesia and Vietnam. The team finished last with only 1 draw against Indonesia on November 21, 2023, and 5 losses.

Long-time general manager, Dan Palami stepped down from his role in January 2024. In 2024, Philippines was invited by Malaysia for the 2024 Merdeka Tournament in September and Thailand for the 2024 King's Cup in October. Philippines then played in the 2024 ASEAN Championship drawing 1–1 all their first group stage match against Myanmar, Laos and Vietnam. Needing a win in their final group stage fixture against Indonesia, Bjørn Martin Kristensen scored from the penalty spot to hand the Philippines a 1–0 victory to secure a spot in the semi-finals. During the first leg of the semi-finals match on December 27 against Thailand, with the match coming to an end, Kike Linares scored a header in stoppage time to secure a 2–1 win. The Philippines' first leg victory was its first over Thailand in 52 years.

== Team image ==
=== Supporters ===
Some fans have organized themselves to support the national team, one of them is the Ultras Filipinas, which formed in 2011. The Kaholeros started out as a gathering of friends using Twitter calling for fans to watch games of the AFC Challenge Cup at the National Sports Grill in Greenbelt. The 'Ultras Filipinas' was established when fans of Philippine Air Force and 'Ultras Kayas' decided to form a support group for the national teams of the Philippines not necessarily just for the football team. The first outing of Ultras Filipinas was not for the national football team but for the national rugby union team. The two fan groups take alternative turns in cheering and chanting for the national team during games.

=== Colors ===
Kit suppliers of the Philippine national team
Company	Dates
(Germany) Puma	1996
(Germany) Adidas	1996–2004
(Japan) Asics	2005
(Germany) Adidas	2006
(Japan) Mizuno	2008–2012
(Philippines) LGR	2012
(Germany) Puma	2012–2015
(Philippines) LGR	2015–2021
(Spain) Kelme	2021–2023
(Philippines) Chronos (as Azkals Sportswear) (Note: The kits were designed by JerseyBird, manufactured by Chronos Athletics and distributed under a subsidiary brand, Azkals Sportswear.)	2023–2024
(Germany) Puma	2024–present

The traditional home kit is similar to the France national team; blue jersey, white shorts, and red socks. However, in recent times, the home and away kit has either been all-blue, all-red or all-white, currently is the all-white as home jerseys. The current kit supplier of the national team is German sportswear Puma. Adidas, as well as Japanese company Mizuno, has provided kits for the team in the past.

Puma was the official outfitter of the national team during the 1996 AFC Asian Cup qualification. Later that year, Adidas assumed that role and outfitted the team that participated at the 1996 Tiger Cup.

For three years from March 2008, Mizuno served as the official outfitter and equipment supplier of the team. It also helped the national federation in its grassroots development program. On June 4, 2012, Puma supplanted Mizuno's role with the national team.

Local firm LGR Sportswear became the official kit provider of the national team in 2015 and a new set of kits made by LGR were unveiled to the public on June 5 which was later used by the team at the 2018 FIFA World Cup qualifiers. The home and away kits were white and blue respectively. Filipino weave design and the three stars and the sun are present at the back of the home and away kits. The goalkeeper's kit is black and has a yellow trim on the chest area and a weave pattern with the three stars and the sun and Azkals logo incorporated in the design, in front around the shoulder area. Adidas was also announced as the footwear sponsor of the team for the qualifiers.

Spanish sportswear brand Kelme became the official kit provider of the national team in 2021.

In June 2022, the team used Chronos Athletics-made kits when they competed in the third round of the 2023 AFC Asian Cup qualifiers in Mongolia. It was later explained that the Kelme kits they were supposed to wear arrived late.

Following Kelme's deal with the Philippines expiring in January 2023, local sportswear brand Chronos Athletics finally became the Philippines' new kit supplier. In March 2023, following a TikTok video that went viral, presenting a concept shirt for the Philippines. The management then decided to acquire the design made by JerseyBird, a small US-based sportswear brand. Chronos Athletics remained as the kit supplier, with both sides agreed to retain the JerseyBird logo on the kits and to be distributed under a subsidiary brand, Azkals Sportswear.

In the recent 2026 FIFA World Cup qualification match against Iraq, the Philippines were seen wearing a new kit design supplied by Puma. On May 3, 2024, Philippines announced a four-year partnership with Puma until 2028.

=== Names ===
Logo of Azkals Philippines

Crest

The monicker Azkals is only used in broadcasts and not used in an official capacity

Under the official FIFA Trigramme the team's name is abbreviated as PHI; this acronym is used by FIFA, the AFC and the AFF to identify the team in official competitions. The team is also identified under the International Organization for Standardization (ISO) country code for the Philippines as PHL. However the team was more commonly known as the RP, the acronym for the country's official name, Republika ng Pilipinas, which the local press used when they referred to the team as the "RP Booters" or the "RP XI". This was until late October 2010 when the Department of Foreign Affairs decided to change the official abbreviation of the country from "RP" to "PH" or "PHL", to be in line with ISO standards. The local press have since referred to the team as either "PH/PHL Booters" or "PH/PHL XI".

They were also known as the "Tri–Stars," which was derived from the three stars on the Philippine flag, although this nickname was not frequently used.

The national team was referred to as the "Azkals". The name was coined when an online Philippine football community proposed the nickname Calle Azul (Spanish for Streets of Blue, referring to the color of their kit) which was modified to Azul Calle, shortened to AzCal, and finally became Azkal – a word that is similar to Filipino term Askal meaning street dog. "Azkals" became a trending topic on Twitter during the semifinals of the 2010 AFF Championship. The name would be officially adopted by the PFF during the tenure of general team manager Dan Palami until 2023. Its discontinuation of its use by the federation was confirmed in February 2024. The Azkals name would be adopted by an independent 7-a-side club in 2024 competing in the 7's Football League led by Palami and former national team players. There are no serious efforts to replace the "Azkals" moniker as of December 2024.

=== Home stadium ===
During the early years of the Philippine national team, they played their home matches at the Manila Carnival Grounds. By 1934 it became the site of the Rizal Memorial Sports Complex. One of the facilities within the complex is the 12,000 capacity national stadium, known as the Rizal Memorial Track and Football Stadium or simply the Rizal Memorial Stadium. Since its opening, it has been the home venue of the Philippine national team until May 2015 when they declared the 25,000 seater and Philippine Sports Stadium in Bocaue, Bulacan as their new home. However, due to disappointing attendance numbers in PSS and RMS and an impressive crowd for Ceres–Negros's run to the 2017 AFC Cup, the Philippine Football Federation decided to make Panaad Stadium the national team's home again for the 2019 AFC Asian Cup qualifiers.

The RMS has also become a hub for track and field. The continued use for athletics along with poor maintenance has deteriorated the stadium and the 1991 Southeast Asian Games was the last time it was used for international football matches. In early 2009, the Philippine Sports Commission planned to transform it to a modern football stadium which would make it usable by the national team for international matches.

The national team also held official international matches at the Cebu City Sports Center in Cebu City, and at the Barotac Nuevo Plaza Field in Barotac Nuevo, Iloilo.

Philippines national football team home stadiums
Image	Stadium	Capacity	Location	Last match
	New Clark City Athletics Stadium	20,000	Capas, Tarlac	v Thailand (August 4, 2026; 2026 ASEAN Championship)
	Philippine Sports Stadium	20,000	Santa Maria, Bulacan	v Thailand (November 25, 2016; 2016 AFF Championship)
	Rizal Memorial Stadium	12,873	Manila	v Myanmar (June 9, 2026; Friendly)
	Panaad Stadium	10,500	Bacolod	v China (October 15, 2019; 2022 FIFA World Cup qualification)
	Cebu City Sports Center	5,500	Cebu City	v Malaysia (April 27, 2014; Friendly)

== Results and fixtures ==
The following is a list of match results in the last 12 months, as well as any future matches that have been scheduled.

Win Draw Loss Fixture

=== 2026 ===
March 31 2027 AFC Asian Cup qualification	Tajikistan	1–1	Philippines	Hisor, Tajikistan
19:00 UTC+5	Boboev 40'	Report; Report (AFC)	Obermair 19'	Stadium: Hisor Central Stadium; Attendance: 15,200; Referee: Hiroki Kasahara (Japan)

June 3 Tri Nation Friendlies	Philippines	5–1	Guam	Manila, Philippines
19:30 UTC+8	Mrowka 5'; Gayoso 18'; Rublico 44'; Leipold 64', 90+2'		Berg 60'	Stadium: Rizal Memorial Stadium; Attendance: 2,243; Referee: Songkran Bunmeekiart (Thailand)

June 9 Tri Nation Friendlies	Philippines	5–1	Myanmar	Manila, Philippines
19:30 UTC+8	J. Tabinas 45+1'; P. Tabinas 54'; Rasmussen 80', 90+1'; Leipold 88'		Win Naing Tun 82'	Stadium: Rizal Memorial Stadium; Attendance: 4,662; Referee: Songkran Bunmeekiart (Thailand)

July 28 2026 ASEAN Championship Group B	Philippines	1–4	Myanmar	Capas, Philippines
18:00 UTC+8	Gayoso 68'	Report	Kyaw Min Oo 45+1'; Than Paing 28', 83'; Win Naing Tun 81'	Stadium: New Clark City Athletics Stadium

August 1 2026 ASEAN Championship Group B	Laos	1–4	Philippines	Vientiane, Laos
17:00 UTC+7	Damoth 7'	Report	Lucero 47'; Viengxay 52' (o.g.); Gayoso 60' (pen.); Sato 88'	Stadium: Laos National Stadium; Referee: Kim Hee-gon (South Korea)

August 4 2026 ASEAN Championship Group B	Philippines	0–1	Thailand	Capas, Philippines
21:00 UTC+8		Report	Waris 84'	Stadium: New Clark City Athletics Stadium; Attendance: 2,786; Referee: Yusuke Ohashi (Japan)

August 8 2026 ASEAN Championship Group B	Malaysia	1–0	Philippines	Kuala Lumpur, Malaysia
21:00 UTC+8	Pavithran 16'	Report		Stadium: Kuala Lumpur Stadium; Attendance: 12,734; Referee: Alimardon Bainazarov (Kyrgyzstan)

September 26 2026 ASEAN Cup Division 1 Group B	Vietnam	1–0	Philippines	Bandung, Indonesia
20:02 UTC+7 (Note: The Vietnam v Philippines match, originally scheduled for 19:30 UTC+7, was delayed for 32 minutes due to weather conditions.)	Nguyễn Đình Bắc 25'	Report		Stadium: Si Jalak Harupat Stadium; Referee: Thoriq Alkatiri (Indonesia)

September 29 2026 ASEAN Cup Division 1 Group B	Philippines	2–2	Pakistan	Bandung, Indonesia
15:00 UTC+7	Reyes 24'; Kristensen 32' (pen.)	Report	Khan 47'; Arshad 62'	Stadium: Si Jalak Harupat Stadium; Referee: Abdurashid Khudoyberganov (Uzbekistan)

October 2 2026 ASEAN Cup Division 1 Group B	Thailand	1–2	Philippines	Bandung, Indonesia
16:40 UTC+7	Sanron 55'	Report	Kristensen 3', 68'	Stadium: Si Jalak Harupat Stadium; Referee: Razlan Joffri Ali (Malaysia)

== Technical staff ==
=== Current technical staff ===
Position	Name
Head coach	(Spain) Carles Cuadrat
Assistant coaches	(Spain) Albert Roca
Assistant coaches	(Philippines) Popoy Clarino
Assistant coaches	(Philippines) Patrick Reichelt
Assistant coaches	(Philippines) Randolfo Clarino
Assistant coaches	(Philippines) Bryan Capistrano
Goalkeeping coach	(Philippines) Eduard Sacapaño
S&C coach	(Philippines) Genaro Sabile
Team analyst	(Spain) Dimas Delgado
Team analyst	(Spain) Sergi Mulet

=== Coaching history ===
Dionisio Calvo, one of the earliest head coaches for the national team

One of the earlier head coaches of the national team was Dionisio Calvo. Foreign coaches of American, Argentinean, English, German, Scottish, Spanish, and Swedish nationality have managed the national team. Juan Cutillas has managed the team in at least four non-consecutive tenures (1969–1978, 1981–1984, 1996–2000 and 2008–09).

Thomas Dooley led the national team to its best finish in a tournament sanctioned by the Asian Football Confederation and FIFA by leading the team to second place at the 2014 AFC Challenge Cup. The past three coaches, Simon McMenemy, Michael Weiß and Thomas Dooley, also made some strides at the regional level leading the team to the semifinals at the AFF Suzuki Cup (2010, 2012 and 2014 editions respectively), the top football tournament in Southeast Asia. Eckhard Krautzun also led the national team to the semifinals, its best finish at the 1991 Southeast Asian Games, before football became an under-23 tournament at said multi-sporting event.

Caretaker managers are listed in italics.

- (Philippines) Dionisio Calvo (1930–1954)
- (Philippines) José Rodriguez (1934)
- (Philippines) José Ozámiz (1935)
- (Philippines) Luis Javellana (1956)
- (Philippines) Ramon Echevarria Sr. (1958)
- (Philippines) Fernando Álvarez (1962)
- (England) Alan Rogers (1962–1963)
- (Scotland) Danny McLennan (1963)
- (Philippines) Orlando Plagata (1965)
- (Philippines) Emilio Pacheco (1967)
- (Spain) Juan Cutillas (1967–1972, 1975–1978, 1981–1984, 1996–2000, 2008–2009)
- (Philippines) Florentino Broce (1973–1974)
- (West Germany) Bernhard Zgoll (1980)
- (Philippines) Lope Pascual (1985)
- (Philippines) Alberto Honasan (1987)
- (Argentina) Carlos Cavagnaro (1989)
- (Philippines) Consorcio Manresa (1991)
- (Germany) Eckhard Krautzun (1991–1992)
- (Philippines) Mariano Araneta (1993)
- (Philippines) Rodolfo Alicante (1993, 2000)
- (Philippines) Noel Casilao (1993–1996)
- (Japan) Masataka Imai (2001)
- (Japan) Sugao Kambe (2002–2003)
- (Philippines) Aris Caslib (2004–2007, 2009)
- (Philippines) Norman Fegidero (2008, 2024) (Note: After the departure of Tom Saintfiet in 2024, Fegidero was appointed as interim coach until PFF finds a replacement for Saintfiet.)
- (Scotland) Des Bulpin (2009–2010)
- (Scotland) Simon McMenemy (2010)
- (Germany) Michael Weiß (2011–2014, 2023–2024)
- (United States) Thomas Dooley (2014–2018, 2022)
- (Philippines) Marlon Maro (2017) (Note: Maro only coached the team that took part at the 2017 CTFA International Tournament in Taiwan which was held in December 2017. Dooley remained the head coach. Maro was supposed to lead a U22 side, but the matches of the CTFA International Tournament were recognized as Tier 1 "A" international matches hence the Philippine Football Federation sent a senior side with Maro as its coach in lieu of Thomas Dooley.)
- (England) Terry Butcher (2018)
- (England) Scott Cooper (2018, 2019)
- (Philippines) Anto Gonzales (2018) (Note: Gonzales only coached the team that took part at the 2018 Bangabandhu Cup in Bangladesh which was held in October 2018. Cooper remained the head coach.)
- (Sweden) Sven-Göran Eriksson (2018–2019)
- (Serbia) Goran Milojević (2019)
- (England) Stewart Hall (2021–2022)
- (Spain) Josep Ferré (2022–2023)
- (Morocco) Barae Jrondi (2023)
- (Belgium) Tom Saintfiet (2024)
- (Spain) Albert Capellas (2024–2025)
- (Spain) Carles Cuadrat (2025–present)

== Players ==
=== Current squad ===
The following 23 players were called up for the 2026 FIFA ASEAN Cup.

Information correct as of October 2, 2026, after the match against Thailand.

No.	Pos.	Player	Date of birth (age)	Caps	Goals	Club
1	GK	Kevin Ray Mendoza	29 September 1994 (age 32)	19	0	(Football Association of Thailand) Chonburi
15	GK	Michael Falkesgaard	9 April 1991 (age 35)	15	0	(Football Association of Thailand) Port
16	GK	Quincy Kammeraad	1 February 2001 (age 25)	6	0	(Football Association of Malaysia) Kuala Lumpur City
2	DF	Scott Woods	7 May 2000 (age 26)	20	0	(Football Federation of Cambodia) Boeung Ket
3	DF	Paul Tabinas	5 July 2002 (age 24)	24	1	(Croatian Football Federation) Dinamo Zagreb
4	DF	Jefferson Tabinas	7 August 1998 (age 28)	30	6	(Football Association of Malaysia) Selangor
5	DF	Jesper Nyholm	10 September 1993 (age 33)	15	1	(Football Association of Thailand) PT Prachuap
12	DF	Amani Aguinaldo	24 April 1995 (age 31)	76	0	(Football Association of Brunei Darussalam) DPMM
13	DF	Angelo Brückner	29 April 2003 (age 23)	1	0	Unattached
20	DF	Isaiah Alakiu	7 October 2008 (age 18)	0	0	(The Football Association) Brighton & Hove Albion U21
21	DF	Daisuke Sato	20 September 1994 (age 32)	67	4	(Philippine Football Federation) One Taguig
6	MF	Sandro Reyes	29 March 2003 (age 23)	38	6	Unattached
8	MF	Manny Ott (captain)	6 May 1992 (age 34)	75	4	(Football Association of Malaysia) Terengganu
11	MF	Randy Schneider	27 August 2001 (age 25)	10	1	(Andorran Football Federation) Andorra
14	MF	Oskari Kekkonen	24 September 1999 (age 27)	24	0	(Football Association of Malaysia) Sabah
17	MF	Cole Mrowka	26 April 2006 (age 20)	9	1	(United States Soccer Federation) Columbus Crew
19	MF	Zico Bailey	27 August 2000 (age 26)	17	1	(United States Soccer Federation) New Mexico United
22	MF	Kenji Nishioka	9 June 2001 (age 25)	9	0	(Football Association of Indonesia) Isenmulang Kalteng
23	MF	Christian Rontini	20 July 1999 (age 27)	29	1	(Italian Football Federation) Antella
7	FW	André Leipold	12 November 2001 (age 25)	10	3	(German Football Association) SC Verl
9	FW	Jarvey Gayoso	11 February 1997 (age 29)	41	7	(Football Association of Malaysia) Penang
10	FW	Bjørn Martin Kristensen	4 May 2002 (age 24)	20	16	(Norwegian Football Federation) KFUM Oslo
18	FW	Sebastian Rasmussen	17 June 2002 (age 24)	16	6	(Danish Football Association) Hobro IK

=== Recent call-ups ===
The following players have been called up to the national team in the past 12 months but are not part of the current squad.

Pos.	Player	Date of birth (age)	Caps	Goals	Club	Latest call-up
GK	Patrick Deyto^{RET}	February 15, 1990 (age 36)	24	0	(Philippines) Kaya–Iloilo	2026 ASEAN Championship
GK	Enrico Mangaoang	May 28, 2002 (age 24)	0	0	(Philippines) Aguilas–UMak	2026 ASEAN Championship
DF	Santiago Rublico	August 18, 2005 (age 21)	19	1	(Spain) Alcorcón B	2026 ASEAN Championship
DF	Adrian Ugelvik	September 21, 2001 (age 25)	10	0	(Norway) Brattvåg	2026 ASEAN Championship
DF	Noah Leddel	August 30, 2003 (age 23)	5	0	(Malaysia) Star City	2026 ASEAN Championship
DF	Jaime Rosquillo	March 20, 2003 (age 23)	2	0	(Philippines) Dynamic Herb Cebu	2026 ASEAN Championship
DF	Michael Kempter	January 12, 1995 (age 31)	15	0	(Thailand) Muangthong United	v. Tajikistan, March 31, 2026
DF	Kike Linares	July 12, 1999 (age 27)	13	1	(Thailand) Chonburi	v. Tajikistan, March 31, 2026
MF	Javier Mariona	October 17, 2004 (age 22)	11	0	(United States) Corpus Christi	2026 ASEAN Championship
MF	John Lucero	December 1, 2003 (age 22)	6	1	(Philippines) One Taguig	2026 ASEAN Championship
MF	Gavin Muens	October 24, 2004 (age 22)	4	0	(Philippines) Kaya–Iloilo	2026 ASEAN Championship
FW	Pocholo Bugas	December 3, 2001 (age 24)	19	0	(Croatia) Vukovar 1991	2026 ASEAN Championship
FW	Martini Rey	June 13, 1999 (age 27)	2	0	(Philippines) Kaya–Iloilo	2026 ASEAN Championship
FW	Andres Aldeguer	December 18, 2003 (age 22)	2	0	(Philippines) One Taguig	2026 ASEAN Championship
FW	Rocket Ritarita	April 16, 2007 (age 19)	1	0	(United States) Maryland Terrapins	2026 ASEAN Championship
FW	Aarran Long	April 25, 2009 (age 17)	1	0	(Philippines) BSM Lions	2026 ASEAN Championship
FW	Alex Monis	March 20, 2003 (age 23)	16	0	(United States) CT United	v. Tajikistan, March 31, 2026
FW	Gerrit Holtmann	March 25, 1995 (age 31)	7	2	(Germany) VfL Bochum	v. Tajikistan, March 31, 2026^{INJ}
FW	Raphael Obermair	April 1, 1996 (age 30)	1	1	(Germany) SC Paderborn	v. Tajikistan, March 31, 2026
^{INJ} Withdrew due to an injury^{PRE} Included in the preliminary squad^{RET} Retired from the national team^{SUS} Serving suspension

== Player records ==
As of October 2, 2026
Players in bold are still active at international level.

=== Most appearances ===
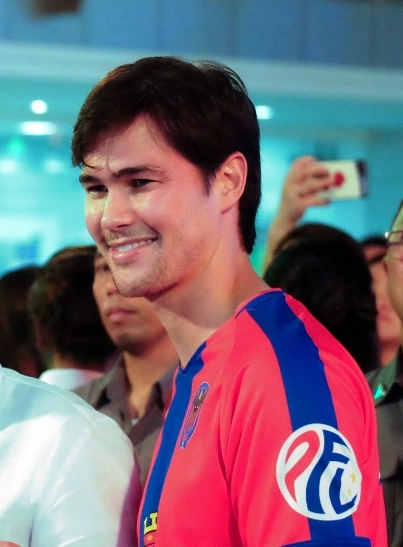
Phil Younghusband is the Philippines' top goalscorer and most capped player.

Rank	Name	Caps	Goals	Career
1	Phil Younghusband	108	52	2006–2019
2	James Younghusband	98	12	2006–2019
3	Patrick Reichelt	93	16	2012–2024
4	Neil Etheridge	82	0	2008–2024
5	**Amani Aguinaldo**	76	0	2013–present
6	**Manny Ott**	75	4	2010–present
7	Chieffy Caligdong	71	16	2004–2013
8	Rob Gier	68	3	2009–2015
9	**Daisuke Sato**	67	4	2014–present
10	Stephan Schröck	61	6	2011–2023

=== Top goalscorers ===
Rank	Name	Goals	Caps	Ratio	Career
1	Phil Younghusband	52	108	0.48	2006–2019
2	**Bjørn Martin Kristensen**	16	20	0.8	2024–present
2	Chieffy Caligdong	16	71	0.23	2004–2013
2	Patrick Reichelt	16	93	0.17	2012–2024
5	Ángel Guirado	13	46	0.28	2011–2021
6	James Younghusband	12	98	0.12	2006–2019
7	Ian Araneta	9	49	0.18	2002–2013
8	Mark Hartmann	8	41	0.2	2011–2023
8	Misagh Bahadoran	8	60	0.13	2011–2018
10	Javier Patiño	7	20	0.35	2013–2019
10	**Jarvey Gayoso**	7	41	0.17	2017–present
10	Chris Greatwich	7	48	0.15	2004–2014

== Competition records ==
=== FIFA World Cup ===
The Philippines has never qualified for the FIFA World Cup. The national team entered the 1950 FIFA World Cup qualification but withdrew without playing a single game. The Philippines had intended to enter the 1962 edition but did not push through with the plan. The country's entry to the 1966 edition was not accepted due to its association not being able to pay the registration fee for the qualifiers and the national team withdrew from the 1974 FIFA World Cup qualification just as they did in the 1950 qualifiers. The national team made its first participation in a FIFA World Cup qualifiers for the 1998 edition.

At the 2002 FIFA World Cup qualifiers, Yanti Barsales made the first goal for the Philippines at a FIFA World Cup qualifier against Syria.

The national team did not enter the qualifiers for the next succeeding editions until the 2014 FIFA World Cup qualifiers, about 10 years later. The national team secured their first victory in a World Cup qualifier against Sri Lanka, 4–0.

FIFA World Cup record								Qualification record						
Year	Round	Pld	W	D	L	GF	GA	Round	Pld	W	D	L	GF	GA
(Uruguay) 1930 to (France) 1938	Did not enter							Did not enter						
(Brazil) 1950	Withdrew							Withdrew						
(Switzerland) 1954 to (Chile) 1962	Did not enter							Did not enter						
(England) 1966	Entry not accepted							Entry not accepted						
(Mexico) 1970	Did not enter							Did not enter						
(West Germany) 1974	Withdrew							Withdrew						
(Argentina) 1978 to (United States) 1994	Did not enter							Did not enter						
(France) 1998	Did not qualify							Round 1	3	0	0	3	0	10
(South Korea) (Japan) 2002	Did not qualify							Round 1	6	0	1	5	2	29
(Germany) 2006 and (South Africa) 2010	Did not enter							Did not enter						
(Brazil) 2014	Did not qualify							Round 2	4	1	1	2	6	6
(Russia) 2018	Did not qualify							Round 2	8	3	1	4	8	12
(Qatar) 2022	Did not qualify							Round 2	8	3	2	3	12	11
(Canada) (Mexico) (United States) 2026	Did not qualify							Round 2	6	0	1	5	3	14
(Morocco) (Portugal) (Spain) 2030	To be determined							To be determined						
(Saudi Arabia) 2034	To be determined							To be determined						
Total	0/23	—	—	—	—	—	—	—	35	7	6	22	31	82

=== Olympic Games ===
Summer Olympics record								Qualifying record						
Year	Round	Pld	W	D	L	GF	GA	Round	Pld	W	D	L	GF	GA
(United Kingdom) 1908 to (Finland) 1952	Did not enter													
(Australia) 1956	Withdrew													
(Italy) 1960	Did not enter													
(Japan) 1964	Withdrew													
(Mexico) 1968	Did not qualify							Round 1	5	0	0	5	3	48
(West Germany) 1972	Did not qualify							Round 1	4	1	0	3	1	19
(Canada) 1976	Did not qualify							Round 1	2	0	0	2	0	6
(Soviet Union) 1980	Did not qualify							Round 1	5	0	0	5	0	32
(United States) 1984	Did not qualify							Round 1	5	0	0	2	1	17
(South Korea) 1988	Did not qualify							Round 1	4	0	0	4	0	31
1992 to present	See Philippines national under-23 team													
Total	0/17	–	–	–	–	–	–	–	22	1	0	21	5	153

=== AFC Asian Cup ===
The Philippines qualified once for the Asian Cup, in 2019. For the 2011 and the 2015 AFC Asian Cup, the Philippines attempted to qualify for the tournament through the AFC Challenge Cup. The Philippines would have been invited to host the 1968 Asian Cup, a tournament in which it did not qualify for, if Iran withdrew as hosts.

AFC Asian Cup record
AFC Asian Cup record									Qualification record						
Year	Round	Pld	W	D	L	GF	GA	Squad	Pld	W	D	L	GF	GA	Link
(Hong Kong) 1956	Did not qualify								2	0	0	2	0	5	1956
(South Korea) 1960	Did not qualify								2	0	0	2	4	14	1960
(Israel) 1964	Withdrew								Withdrew						1964
(Iran) 1968	Did not qualify								4	0	0	4	0	24	1968
(Thailand) 1972	Withdrew								Withdrew						1972
(Iran) 1976	Withdrew								Withdrew						1976
(Kuwait) 1980	Did not qualify								3	0	0	3	1	10	1980
(Singapore) 1984	Did not qualify								5	0	0	5	3	16	1984
(Qatar) 1988	Did not enter								Did not enter						1988
(Japan) 1992	Did not enter								Did not enter						1992
(United Arab Emirates) 1996	Did not qualify								3	0	0	3	1	20	1996
(Lebanon) 2000	Did not qualify								3	1	0	2	2	11	2000
(China) 2004	Did not enter								Did not enter						2004
(Indonesia) (Malaysia) (Thailand) (Vietnam) 2007	Did not enter								Did not enter						2007
(Qatar) 2011	Did not qualify								AFC Challenge Cup						
(Australia) 2015	Did not qualify								AFC Challenge Cup						
(United Arab Emirates) 2019	Group stage	3	0	0	3	1	7	Squad	14	6	4	4	21	20	2019
(Qatar) 2023	Did not qualify								11	4	3	4	13	15	2023
(Saudi Arabia) 2027	Did not qualify								12	4	3	5	19	20	2027
Total	Group stage	3	0	0	3	1	7	–	59	15	10	34	64	155	

=== Asian Games ===
Asian Games record
Year	Round	Pld	W	D	L	GF	GA	Squad
(India) 1951	Withdrew							
(Philippines) 1954	Round 1	2	0	0	2	2	7	Squad
(Japan) 1958	Quarter-finals	3	1	0	2	2	8	Squad
(Indonesia) 1962	Round 1	3	0	0	3	1	27	Squad
(Thailand) 1966 and (Thailand) 1970	Did not enter							
(Iran) 1974	Round 1	3	0	0	3	0	21	Squad
(Thailand) 1978 to (Thailand) 1998	Did not enter							
2002 to present	See Philippines national under-23 team							
Total	4/13	11	1	0	10	5	63	–

=== AFC Challenge Cup ===
The AFC Challenge Cup was organized as a route for nations classified as "emerging" or "developing" as a sole route to qualify for the Asian Cup. The Philippines is among these nations and participated at the inaugural 2006 AFC Challenge Cup. After a qualification phase was introduced the Philippines failed to qualify for the next two succeeding editions in 2008 and 2010. The Philippines qualified for the 2012 AFC Challenge Cup where they finished third. Phil Younghusband was the Golden Boot winner of the edition scoring six goals in the final tournament. The team reached the finals of 2014 edition of the tournament settling for second place after losing to Palestine in the finals. The AFC Challenge Cup tournament was dissolved after the 2014 edition.

AFC Challenge Cup record
AFC Challenge Cup record									Qualification record						
Year	Round	Pld	W	D	L	GF	GA	Squad	Round	Pld	W	D	L	GF	GA
(Bangladesh) 2006	Group stage	3	0	2	1	2	3	Squad	No qualification						
(India) 2008	Did not qualify								Group stage	3	2	1	0	4	0
(Sri Lanka) 2010	Did not qualify								Group stage	3	1	0	2	3	8
(Nepal) 2012	Third place	5	3	0	2	9	8	Squad	Round 2	5	2	2	1	7	3
(Maldives) 2014	Runners-up	5	3	1	1	7	3	Squad	Group stage	2	2	0	0	9	0
Total	3/5	13	6	3	4	18	14	–	–	13	7	3	3	23	11

=== Far Eastern Games ===
Out of the ten football tournaments held in ten editions of the Far Eastern Games, The Philippines only won the inaugural 1913 edition despite fielding American, Spanish and British players violating tournament rules in that edition. The team was nevertheless named champions. China was awarded champions of the nine other editions of the tournaments. At the 1917 Far Eastern Games, the Philippines recorded its biggest victory in an international match to date, which was the 15–2 win against Japan. FC Barcelona player Paulino Alcántara was part of the national squad.

Far Eastern Games record
Year	Round	Pld	W	D	L	GF	GA
(Philippines) 1913	Champions	1	1	0	0	2	1
(Republic of China (1912–1949)) 1915	Runners-up	3	0	2	1	1	2
(Japan) 1917	Runners-up	2	1	0	1	15	5
(Philippines) 1919	Runners-up	3	1	0	2	3	5
(Republic of China (1912–1949)) 1921	Runners-up	2	1	0	1	3	1
(Japan) 1923	Runners-up	2	1	0	1	2	4
(Philippines) 1925	Runners-up	2	1	0	1	5	5
(Republic of China (1912–1949)) 1927	Third place	2	0	0	2	2	5
(Japan) 1930	Third place	2	0	0	2	2	12
(Philippines) 1934	Third place	3	1	0	2	6	8
Total	10/10	22	7	2	13	41	48

=== ASEAN Championship ===
The Philippines participated in every edition of the AFF Championship except the 2008 edition, in which the team failed to qualify for the final tournament. Their first match in the tournament was a 0–5 defeat handed by Thailand in the 1996 edition. Freddy Gonzalez scored the first goal for the Philippines in the tournament in a 1–3 defeat, also to Thailand, in the 1998 edition. Chieffy Caligdong scored a brace in the national team's 2–1 victory against Timor Leste in the 2004 edition. The victory was the first for the Philippines in the AFF Championship.

The national team fared poorly during the first seven editions of the ASEAN Championships from 1996 to 2008, losing 19 out of 21 matches. Their worst defeat at the tournament was the 1–13 match against Indonesia at the 2002 AFF Championship which was also remains the highest scoreline in the tournament as of 2026. The national team reached its first semi-finals at the 2010 AFF Championship after defeating Vietnam in a 2–0 upset victory dubbed the "Miracle of Hanoi".

ASEAN Championship record
ASEAN Championship record										Qualification record					
Year	Round	Pos	Pld	W	D	L	GF	GA	Squad	Pld	W	D	L	GF	GA
(Singapore) 1996	Group stage	10th	4	0	0	4	0	16	Squad	No qualification					
(Vietnam) 1998	Group stage	8th	3	0	0	3	3	11	Squad	2	0	1	1	1	2
(Thailand) 2000	Group stage	8th	3	0	0	3	0	8	Squad	No qualification					
(Indonesia) (Singapore) 2002	Group stage	9th	4	0	0	4	3	24	Squad	No qualification					
(Malaysia) (Vietnam) 2004	Group stage	7th	4	1	0	3	4	9	Squad	No qualification					
(Singapore) (Thailand) 2007	Group stage	7th	3	0	1	2	0	8	Squad	4	3	0	1	13	3
(Indonesia) (Thailand) 2008	Did not qualify									4	2	1	1	6	5
(Indonesia) (Vietnam) 2010	Semi-finals	4th	5	1	2	2	3	3	Squad	3	1	2	0	7	2
(Malaysia) (Thailand) 2012	Semi-finals	3rd	5	2	1	2	4	3	Squad	Qualified automatically					
(Singapore) (Vietnam) 2014	Semi-finals	4th	5	2	1	2	9	7	Squad	Qualified automatically					
(Myanmar) (Philippines) 2016	Group stage	6th	3	0	2	1	2	3	Squad	Qualified as co-hosts					
(ASEAN) 2018	Semi-finals	4th	6	2	2	2	7	7	Squad	Qualified automatically					
(Singapore) 2020	Group stage	5th	4	2	0	2	12	6	Squad	Qualified automatically					
(ASEAN) 2022	Group stage	7th	4	1	0	3	8	10	Squad	Qualified automatically					
(ASEAN) 2024	Semi-finals	3rd	6	2	3	1	7	7	Squad	Qualified automatically					
(ASEAN) 2026	Group stage	7th	4	1	0	3	5	7	Squad	Qualified automatically					
Total	Semi-finals	15/16	63	14	12	37	67	129	–	13	6	4	3	27	12

=== Southeast Asian Games ===
The senior national team managed to reach the semi-finals of the football tournament of the Southeast Asian Games before the football was made into an under-23 tournament.

Southeast Asian Games record
Year	Round	Pld	W	D	L	GF	GA	Squad
1959 to 1975	Not affiliated to SEAP							
(Malaysia) 1977	Round 1	3	1	1	1	5	7	–
(Indonesia) 1979	Did not enter							
(Philippines) 1981	Round 1	2	0	0	2	0	3	–
(Singapore) 1983	Round 1	2	0	1	1	0	5	–
(Thailand) 1985	Round 1	2	0	0	2	0	13	–
(Indonesia) 1987	Did not enter							
(Malaysia) 1989	Round 1	3	0	0	3	1	10	–
(Philippines) 1991	Semi-finals	4	1	1	2	6	10	Squad
(Singapore) 1993	Round 1	3	0	0	3	1	11	–
(Thailand) 1995	Round 1	4	1	0	3	2	9	–
(Indonesia) 1997	Round 1	4	0	0	4	1	13	–
(Brunei) 1999	Round 1	4	0	0	4	3	18	Squad
2001 to present	See Philippines national under-23 team							
Total	10/12	31	3	3	25	19	99	–

=== FIFA ASEAN Cup ===
FIFA ASEAN Cup record
Year	Round	Pld	W	D	L	GF	GA	Squad
(Indonesia) 2026	Group stage	3	1	1	1	4	4	

=== Minor tournaments ===
The Philippines participated at numerous minor friendly tournaments. Aside from other national teams, the Philippine nationals also faced selection teams and club sides from other nations at some of these tournaments. The team made a podium finish, placing not below third place, at the Japanese Empire-sanctioned East Asian Games in 1940, the Long Teng Cup (2010, 2011) held in Taiwan, and all three editions of the Philippine Peace Cup (2012, 2013 and 2014) hosted by the home country.

Minor tournaments record
Tournament	Round	Position	Pld	W	D	L	GF	GA
(Japan) 1940 East Asian Games (2600th Anniversary Since Kigen)	Group stage	3rd	3	0	2	1	3	4
(Federation of Malaya) 1962 Merdeka Tournament	Group stage	5th in group	4	0	0	4	2	23
(Malaysia) 1971 Merdeka Tournament	Group stage	11th	5	0	1	4	7	16
(Singapore) 1971 Pesta Sukan Cup	Quarter-finals	8th	2	0	0	2	1	4
(Indonesia) 1972 Jakarta Anniversary Tournament	Group stage	3rd in group	4	2	1	1	4	5
(Malaysia) 1972 Merdeka Tournament	Group stage	8th	5	1	2	2	8	10
(Singapore) 1972 Pesta Sukan Cup	Group stage	3rd in group	2	0	0	2	1	7
(South Korea) 1972 President's Cup Football Tournament	Group stage	8th	4	0	0	4	0	22
(Indonesia) 1981 Jakarta Anniversary Tournament	Group stage	3rd in group	3	1	0	2	2	15
(Thailand) 1982 King's Cup	Group stage	5th in group	4	0	0	4	0	6
1985 Brunei Merdeka Games	Group stage	3rd in group	2	0	0	2	1	8
1986 Brunei Merdeka Games	Group stage	3rd in group	2	0	0	2	1	6
(Philippines) 1986 President Aquino Cup	Group stage	4th	3	0	0	3	1	12
1987 Brunei Merdeka Games	Group stage	3rd in group	2	0	0	2	0	4
1990 Brunei Merdeka Games	Group stage	3rd in group	2	0	0	2	0	7
1991 Philippines International Cup	Group stage	4th	3	1	1	1	2	2
1993 Philippines International Cup	Third place match	4th	5	2	1	2	4	4
(Philippines) 1997 President's Cup	Third place match	4th	4	1	2	1	4	4
(Philippines) 1998 President's Centennial Cup	Third place match	4th	5	2	0	3	5	11
(Taiwan) 2010 Long Teng Cup	Group stage	3rd	3	1	1	1	8	5
(Taiwan) 2011 Long Teng Cup	Group stage	2nd	3	1	2	0	5	3
(Philippines) 2012 Philippine Peace Cup	Group stage	1st	3	3	0	0	9	1
(Philippines) 2013 Philippine Peace Cup	Group stage	1st	2	1	0	1	3	2
(Philippines) 2014 Philippine Peace Cup	Final	2nd	2	1	0	1	7	4
(Taiwan) 2017 CTFA International Tournament	Group stage	2nd	3	1	0	2	3	5
(Bangladesh) 2018 Bangabandhu Gold Cup	Semi-finals	3rd	3	2	0	1	4	3
(Singapore) 2022 FAS Tri-Nations Series	Group stage	3rd	2	0	0	2	0	4
(Malaysia) 2024 Merdeka Tournament	Third place match	4th	2	0	1	1	1	2
(Thailand) 2024 King's Cup	Third place match	3rd	2	1	0	1	4	3
Total	–	–	78	18	11	49	80	185

=== Regional record ===
Last meet up against Southeast Asia countries
Opponents	Date	Score	Outcome	Match type
Brunei	December 23, 2022	5−1	Won	2022 AFF Championship
Cambodia	December 20, 2022	2−3	Lost	2022 AFF Championship
Indonesia	December 21, 2024	1−0	Won	2024 ASEAN Championship
Laos	August 1, 2026	4−1	Win	2026 ASEAN Championship
Malaysia	August 8, 2026	0−1	Lost	2026 ASEAN Championship
Myanmar	July 28, 2026	1−4	Lost	2026 ASEAN Championship
Singapore	March 29, 2022	2−0	Lost	2022 FAS Tri-Nations Series
Thailand	October 2, 2026	2−1	Win	2026 FIFA ASEAN Cup
Timor-Leste	October 14, 2025	3−1	Won	2027 AFC Asian Cup qualification
Vietnam	September 26, 2026	0−1	Lost	2026 FIFA ASEAN Cup

== Honours ==
=== Continental ===
- AFC Challenge Cup
  - (silver) Runners-up (1): 2014
  - (bronze) Third place (1): 2012

=== Regional ===
- Far Eastern Championship Games
  - (gold) Gold medal (1): 1913
  - (silver) Silver medal (6): 1915, 1917, 1919, 1921, 1923, 1925
  - (bronze) Bronze medal (3): 1927, 1930, 1934

=== Friendly ===
- Philippine Peace Cup (2): 2012, 2013
- Tri Nation Friendlies (1): 2026

=== Awards ===
- ASEAN Championship Fair Play Award (1): 2010

=== Summary ===
Only official honours are included, according to FIFA statutes (competitions organized/recognized by FIFA or an affiliated confederation).

Competition	1st place, gold medalist(s)	2nd place, silver medalist(s)	3rd place, bronze medalist(s)	Total
AFC Challenge Cup	0	1	1	2
Total	0	1	1	2

== See also ==
- Football in the Philippines
- Philippines national football team results
- Philippines at the AFC Asian Cup

=== Men's ===
- Philippines national under-23 football team
- Philippines national under-21 football team
- Philippines national under-19 football team
- Philippines national under-17 football team

=== Women's ===
- Philippines women's national football team
- Philippines women's national under-20 football team
- Philippines women's national under-17 football team
