= Rodolfo Alicante =

Filipino football player and coach

Personal information
- Full name: Rodolfo Guanzon Alicante
- Date of birth: January 21, 1960 (age 66)
- Place of birth: La Paz, Iloilo City, Philippines
- Positions: Midfielder; sweeper

Team information
- Current team: Green Archers United

International career
Years	Team	Apps	(Gls)
1989–1991	Philippines	3	(1)

Managerial career
- 1996–2000: Philippines (Asst. coach)
- 2000: Philippines
- Philippines U-21 (Asst. coach)
- Philippines U-23 (Asst. coach)
- 1995–2009: PAREF Southridge School
- 2008–2009: Far Eastern University
- 2011–2018: Green Archers United

Rodolfo "Dolfo" Alicante Guanzon is a retired Filipino professional footballer and manager. He was coach at Far Eastern University in 2008 and 2009. He coached at the PAREF Southridge School (ages 5–15) during the 1995-2009 school years. He is a former coach of Green Archers United.

== International career ==
=== International goals ===
#	Date	Venue	Opponent	Score	Result	Competition
1.	23 August 1989	Kuala Lumpur	Indonesia	1–0	1–5 (Lost)	1989 Southeast Asian Games
