= Juan Cutillas =

Spanish footballer and manager (1942–2025)

Personal information
- Full name: Juan Cutillas España
- Date of birth: 2 July 1942
- Place of birth: Barcelona, Spain
- Date of death: 7 July 2025 (aged 83)
- Place of death: Málaga, Spain
- Position: Striker

Youth career
- Atlético Madrid

Senior career*
Years	Team	Apps	(Gls)
	Atlético Madrid		(0)

Managerial career
- 1967–1972: Philippines
- c. 1968: Philippines Youth
- c. 1970s: San Miguel Corp.
- 1975–1978: Philippines
- 1980–1981: Taringa Rovers
- 1981–1984: Philippines
- c. 1980s: Brisbane City
- c. 1990s: Taringa Rovers
- 1996–2000: Philippines
- Pachanga F.C.
- 2008–2009: Philippines
- 2011–2012: Kaya F.C.
- * Club domestic league appearances and goals

Juan Cutillas España (Spanish: [ˈxwaŋ kuˈtiʎas esˈpaɲa]; 2 July 1942 – 7 July 2025) was a Spanish professional footballer and later a manager. He was the head coach of the Philippines national team.

== Education ==
Cutillas studied medicine against the wishes of his father who had wanted him to enter law school. After finishing medical school, Cutillas became a doctor and practiced medicine for four years. He later took football coaching courses.

== Football career ==
=== Club ===
Cutillas played for the youth team of Atlético de Madrid. When called up to join the first team, he was forced to decline the offer because he was engaged in compulsory military service at the time. He eventually played for the first team in a game against Zaragoza.

Andres Soriano of the San Miguel Corporation brought Cutillas along with Francisco Escalante, Enrique de la Mata Calvo, and Claudio Sanchez as a Spanish contingent to compete in local commercial leagues in the Philippines in 1961. Cutillas left the country in 1965 for Spain to finish his medical studies and earn his physical training diploma but later returned to the Philippines in 1967.

=== Managerial ===
==== Philippines ====
After returning from Spain where he also obtained a national coaching license, Cutillas was appointed the head coach of the Philippine national team in late 1967, succeeding Emilio Pacheco. Among his results with the national team on his first stint was a 2–1 win over American club Dallas Tornado at home in 1968 with practically the same squad that played in the 0–15 record loss to Japan in the Asian Olympic qualifiers. He also coached the Philippine team that participated at the 1968 AFC Youth Championship. The Philippines reached the quarterfinals, its best finish in the tournament. Florentino Broce took over as head coach of the national team from 1993 until 1994. The national team's poor performance at the 1974 Asian Games led to the Philippine Football Association opting to reappoint Cutillas. Cutillas coached until 1978.

He also led San Beda College to three consecutive football titles at the NCAA, as well as steering the San Miguel Corporation FC to five PFA championships.

==== Australia ====
In 1985, during the onset of the People Power Revolution, Cutillas briefly left the Philippines for Australia where he coached a handful of Australian professional football teams. He was named coach of the year by the Queensland Football Federation in 1987 for leading Brisbane City to a Grand Final finish and in 1993 for leading the Taringa Rovers in the Queensland Cup. He served as head coach of the Queensland State and also the Queensland Academy of Sport from 1991 to 1996.

==== Return to the Philippines ====
Cutillas coached the Philippine national team thrice after he returned from Australia, from 1981 to 1984, 1996 to 2000 and 2008 to 2009.

Cutillas became head coach of Pachanga Diliman but later left for Kaya due to issues with some members of the management staff of the former.

== Other sports ==
Cutillas was a lecturer at the University of the Philippines and was the physical director of the Philippine National Men's Basketball team from 1976 to 1985. He was the trainer of the Philippine team to the 1974 FIBA World Championship.

== Personal life and death ==
Cutillas returned to Spain after coaching with Kaya in the United Football League.

He married Tessy da Silva, a Filipina mestiza in 1964. They had two daughters. Da Silva died in 2022.

Cutillas resided in Benalmádena. He died in Málaga on 7 July 2025, at the age of 83.
