= Masataka Imai =

Japanese footballer and manager

Masataka Imai 今井 雅隆
Personal information
- Full name: Masataka Imai
- Date of birth: April 2, 1959 (age 67)
- Place of birth: Shizuoka, Shizuoka, Japan
- Height: 1.80 m (5 ft 11 in)
- Position: Goalkeeper

Youth career
- 1975–1977: Shizuoka Motors Technical High School
- 1978–1981: Kokushikan University

Senior career*
Years	Team	Apps	(Gls)
1982–1990	Honda	115	(0)
Total		115	(0)

International career
1989	Japan Futsal		

Managerial career
- 1989–1992: Honda
- 2001: Philippines
- 2002: Avispa Fukuoka
- 2003–2004: Macau
- 2007: Tokushima Vortis
- 2020-2022: Azul Claro Numazu
- * Club domestic league appearances and goals

Masataka Imai (今井 雅隆, Imai Masataka; born April 2, 1959) is a former Japanese football player and manager.

== Club career ==
Imai was born in Shizuoka on April 2, 1959. After graduating from Kokushikan University, he joined Honda in 1982. He played 115 games in Japan Soccer League. He retired in 1990.

== Futsal career ==
In 1989, Imai was elected to the Japan national futsal team for the 1989 Futsal World Championship in Netherlands.

== Coaching career ==
In 1989, Imai became a playing manager at Honda. In 2001, he became a manager for Philippines national team. In 2002, he returned to Japan and signed with Avispa Fukuoka. In 2003, he became a manager for Macau national team and he managed until 2004. In 2007, he signed with Tokushima Vortis.

== Managerial statistics ==
Managerial statistics
Team	From	To	Record				
Team	From	To	G	W	D	L	Win %
Avispa Fukuoka	2002	2002	21	7	7	7	33.33
Tokushima Vortis	2007	2007	48	6	15	27	12.50
Total			69	13	22	34	18.84
