= Miracle of Hanoi =

Philippines v Vietnam (2010)
Miracle of Hanoi
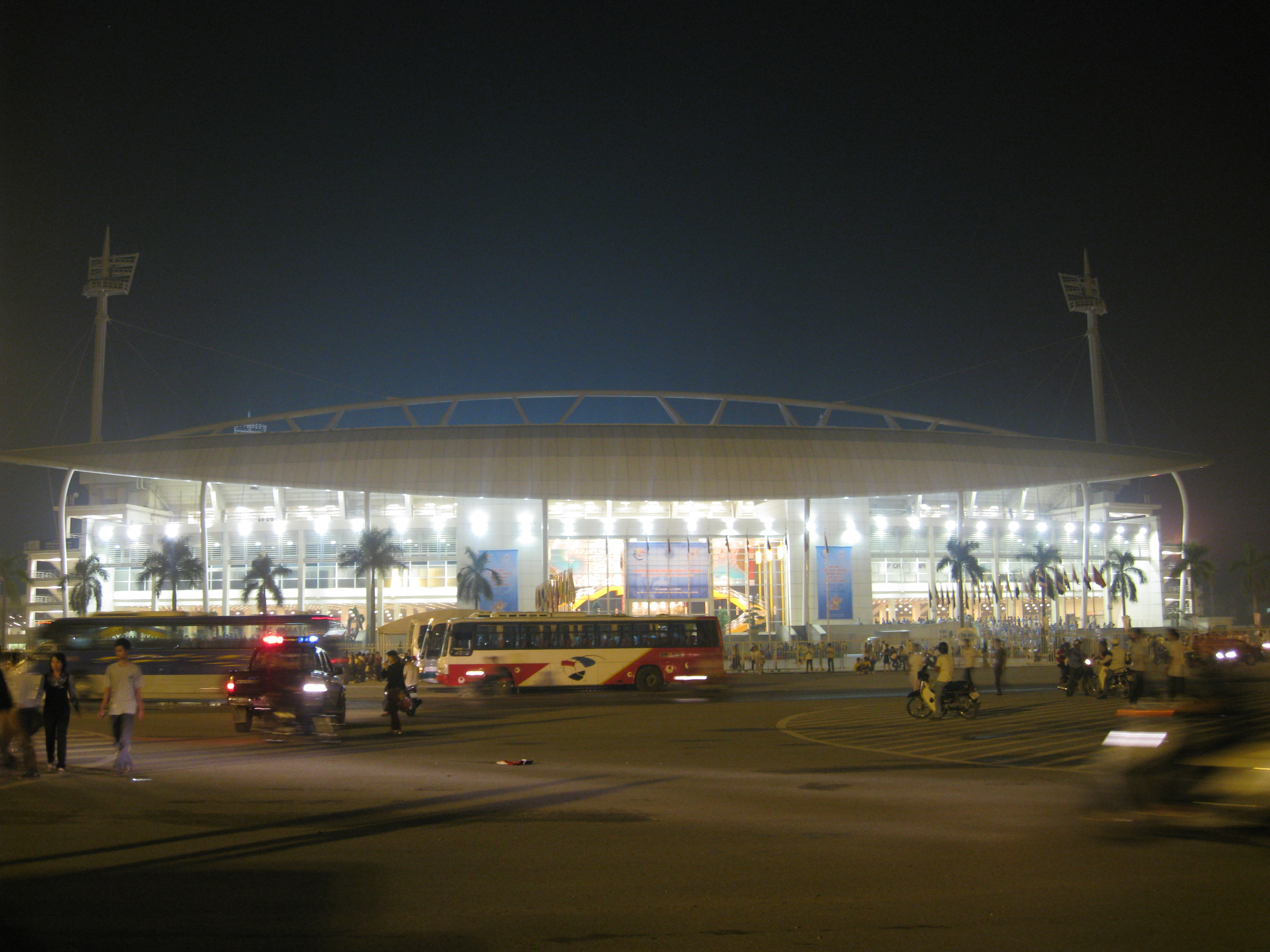
- Event: 2010 AFF Championship Group B Matchday 2
Philippines	Vietnam
(Philippines)	(Vietnam)
2	0
- Date: December 5, 2010; 15 years ago
- Venue: Mỹ Đình National Stadium, Hanoi
- Referee: Jimmy Napitupulu (Indonesia)
- Attendance: 40,000

The Miracle of Hanoi was a football match between the Philippines and Vietnam in the group stage of the 2010 AFF Championship. The Philippines' 2–0 win against Vietnam is widely regarded as the start of the Philippines' resurgence in football in the 2010s. Prior to the match, the Philippines were known for being among the weakest sides in Asian football. The match was held at the Mỹ Đình National Stadium in Hanoi. The Philippines would later clinch their first semifinals appearance in the tournament's history.

== Background ==
The Philippines prior to the 2010s were regarded as one of the weakest national teams in Asia. The Philippines had to qualify for the tournament proper of the 2010 AFF Championship, also known as the Suzuki Cup for sponsorship reasons. Along with Laos, the Philippines clinched the two contested berths for the 2010 AFF Championship in the qualifiers. Ian Araneta's hat trick in a 5–0 win over Timor-Leste was a significant factor in securing the Philippines' qualification to the tournament proper, since they, Laos, and Cambodia were tied in points.

Dan Palami became involved as the national team's manager and main sponsor in December 2009, with the Philippine Football Federation allowing Palami to have autonomy over its management. Palami was in charge of recruiting players and hiring the coach of the team. Des Bulpin was hired as head coach shortly after Palami's entry but Bulpin was replaced by Simon McMenemy. Palami gathered both local-based players and foreigners of Filipino descent alike to form a squad and focused on the team's defense. He also had to fund the team since the only major private sponsor prior to the 2010 AFF Championship is sportwear outfitter Mizuno.

The Philippines' squad for the 2010 AFF Championship had seven players which were part of the national team that played at the 2004 edition of the same tournament. These were Ian Araneta, Aly Borromeo, Emelio Caligdong, Roel Gener, Anton del Rosario, Peter Jaugan and Chris Greatwich.

== Pre-match ==
Entering the group stage, three-time champions Singapore and defending champions and hosts Vietnam were favored to advance to the semifinals. The Philippines started their campaign with a 1–1 draw with Singapore through an injury-time goal from Chris Greatwich. This result ended the Philippines' eleven-match losing streak to Singapore, which dates back to the former's heavy 0–5 loss at the 1972 President's Cup in South Korea. Vietnam routed Myanmar with seven goals, with the opposition only managing to reply with a single goal.

Prior to the match, the Philippines had never won against Vietnam with a record of five defeats and two 2–2 draws since the unification of North and South Vietnam. Philippines head coach Simon McMenemy said that his team would improve on their counterattacking while his Vietnam counterpart Henrique Calisto remarked that his team would have to overcome the Philippines' defense.

Team	Pld	W	D	L	GF	GA	GD	Pts
Vietnam	1	1	0	0	7	1	+6	3
Singapore	1	0	1	0	1	1	0	1
Philippines	1	0	1	0	1	1	0	1
Myanmar	1	0	0	1	1	7	−6	0

== Match details ==
The match began at 19:30 (UTC+7) before a crowd of 40,000 spectators. Roel Gener started in lieu of Emelio Caligdong. Phil Younghusband experienced a stomachache throughout the game, reportedly due to something he ate during his team's breakfast earlier the same day.

The Philippines was the first team to have a close chance to score in the 18th minute, when the Vietnamese defenders failed to avert a corner kick by Phil Younghusband. The ball reached Ian Araneta but he failed to capitalize, with his shot going far off the post. A minute later Phạm Thành Lương's attempt was blocked by Filipino goalkeeper Neil Etheridge. However, some minutes following that chance Etheridge handled the ball outside his penalty area, conceding a free kick. Nguyễn Minh Phương's curved shot went past the wall but came wide. In the 38th minute Chris Greatwich opened the scoring for the Philippines, who held on for the rest of the first half.

Vietnam made several attempts to equalize in the second half: Nguyễn Vũ Phong failed to score from the edge in the 58th minute, Nguyễn Anh Đức was stopped by Rob Gier and substitute Nguyễn Trọng Hoàng had his attempt saved by Etheridge two minutes after he entered the pitch.

Phil Younghusband scored the Philippines' second goal when he made a low shot on Vietnam's side of the pitch that Dương Hồng Sơn could not keep out.

December 5, 2010
19:30

Philippines	2–0	Vietnam
C. Greatwich 38'; P. Younghusband 79'	Report

Mỹ Đình National Stadium, Hanoi
Attendance: 40,000
Referee: Jimmy Napitupulu (Indonesia)

Philippines	Vietnam

GK	1	Neil Etheridge	(yellow card) 20'
RB	11	Aly Borromeo (c)
CB	4	Anton del Rosario
CB	2	Rob Gier
LB	27	Ray Jónsson
RM	7	James Younghusband
CM	18	Chris Greatwich
CM	17	Jason de Jong	(yellow card) 53'
LM	6	Roel Gener		(substituted off) 90+4'
SS	23	Ian Araneta
CF	10	Phil Younghusband		(substituted off) 86'
Substitutes:
MF	19	Nestorio Margarse		(substituted on) 86'
FW	9	Yanti Barsales		(substituted on) 90+4'
Head coach:
(Scotland) Simon McMenemy

GK	1	Dương Hồng Sơn
RB	16	Huỳnh Quang Thanh
CB	4	Lê Phước Tứ	(yellow card) 43'
CB	7	Vũ Như Thành		(substituted off) 81'
LB	6	Trần Đình Đồng	(yellow card) 63'	(substituted off) 71'
CM	12	Nguyễn Minh Phương (c)
CM	22	Phan Văn Tài Em
CM	14	Lê Tấn Tài		(substituted off) 62'
RF	17	Nguyễn Vũ Phong
CF	30	Nguyễn Anh Đức
LF	19	Phạm Thành Lương
Substitutes:
MF	11	Nguyễn Trọng Hoàng		(substituted on) 62'
FW	26	Lê Sỹ Mạnh		(substituted on) 71'
FW	13	Nguyễn Quang Hải		(substituted on) 81'
Head coach:
(Portugal) Henrique Calisto

== Remainder of tournament ==
The Philippines found themselves topping Group B following the conclusion of the second matchday. This is the Group B ranking after the match.

Team	Pld	W	D	L	GF	GA	GD	Pts
Philippines	2	1	1	0	3	1	+2	4
Singapore	2	1	1	0	3	2	+1	4
Vietnam	2	1	0	1	7	3	+4	3
Myanmar (E)	2	0	0	2	2	9	−7	0

Immediately after the match, Vietnam's coach Henrique Calisto refused to shake hands with his Philippine counterpart Simon McMenemy. Calisto later rebuked the Philippines' tactics as "poor football" and was critical of the Philippines for "putting the bus in front of the goal", remarking that "football is not putting eight players in front of the area with no offensive system". McMenemy for his part was left in disbelief at his team's feat.

After the win, the Philippines had to secure at least a draw against Myanmar to ensure their place in the semifinals, which they managed to do to finish ahead of Singapore to face Indonesia in the two-legged semifinals. Meanwhile, Vietnam snatched back first place courtesy of a win against Singapore.

Group B final standings

Team	Pld	W	D	L	GF	GA	GD	Pts
Vietnam	3	2	0	1	8	3	+5	6
Philippines	3	1	2	0	3	1	+2	5
Singapore	3	1	1	1	3	3	0	4
Myanmar	3	0	1	2	2	9	−7	1

However, the Azkals had to play both of their matches before a hostile crowd at the Gelora Bung Karno Stadium in Jakarta, as they had no available stadium that conforms to AFF standards at the time. Even the Rizal Memorial Stadium was still months away from completing renovation. Unable to withstand immense pressure from Indonesian fans, the Philippines ended their fairytale journey after losing both legs without scoring a single goal.

Knockout stage bracket

Semi-finals
A2	Malaysia	2	0	2
B1	Vietnam	0	0	0
B2	Philippines	0	0	0
A1	Indonesia	1	1	2

Final
A2	Malaysia	3	1	4
A1	Indonesia	0	2	2

Semifinals – Philippines v Indonesia

December 16, 2010
19:00 UTC+7

Philippines	0–1	Indonesia
	Report	Gonzáles 32'

Gelora Bung Karno Stadium, Jakarta
Attendance: 70,000
Referee: Masoud Moradi (Iran)
December 19, 2010
19:00 UTC+7

Indonesia	1–0	Philippines
Gonzáles 43'	Report

Gelora Bung Karno Stadium, Jakarta
Attendance: 88,000
Referee: Ali Abdulnabi (Bahrain)

Indonesia won 2–0 on aggregate.

== Media coverage ==
The match was broadcast live by VTV in Vietnam and ABS-CBN in the Philippines. Prior to that match, no Philippines-based firm had rights to broadcast the 2010 AFF Championship in the country. (The Azkals' tie with Singapore was not broadcast live in the Philippines.)

ABS-CBN chairman Eugenio Lopez III personally called then ABS-CBN Sports vice president Peter Musñgi to secure broadcasting rights for ABS-CBN to air live matches of the Philippines at the 2010 AFF Championship on December 5, the same day that the Philippines–Vietnam match was scheduled. In turn, Musñgi negotiated with the tournament's Singapore-based broadcast rights owner. ABS-CBN was also asked if it could potentially cover a potential Azkals match at home if they progressed to the semifinals. Musñgi pledged that the media firm had the capability. Musñgi managed to secure the rights for free, relying on the fact that it was the first time that a Philippine broadcaster would cover the tournament.

== Aftermath ==
=== Philippines ===
The milestone match in Philippine football history would be later be referred to as the Miracle of Hanoi by Filipino fans. It is widely regarded to have marked the start of a "renaissance" in the state of football in the Philippines and was considered one of the Philippines' biggest upsets in AFF Championship history along with their win over Timor Leste in the 2004 edition.

The Philippine national football team paid an official courtesy call with then-President Benigno Aquino III at the Malacañang Palace in Manila who congratulated them for their performance in the championship. The team was conferred with the Presidential Achievement Award by the Philippine Sportswriters Association (PSA). Team manager Dan Palami was also recognized for his contribution in forming the national team and was named Executive of the Year.

The win contributed to the increase of interest in football in the Philippines. It was followed by a successful bid to qualify for the 2012 AFC Challenge Cup and the second round of the 2014 FIFA World Cup qualifiers in 2011. Eventually this culminated in even greater success: qualification for the 2019 AFC Asian Cup, which was the first major tournament in the country's football history.

The Azkals' win was included in Sports Illustrated's top ten association football stories for 2010.

Vietnam and the Philippines were drawn in the same group in the following edition of the AFF Championship in 2012. Again Vietnam lost to the Philippines but this time by a single goal. Thailand and the Philippines eventually advanced to the semifinals at Vietnam's expense. As of January 2025, this was the Philippines' last major win over Vietnam, with defeats in the 2014 and 2018 AFF Championships. The Philippines almost won their tie against Vietnam in the 2024 edition with their opponent scoring an equalizer in extra time.

=== Vietnam ===
The match's outcome created a huge shock for the country, marking the slow end of Vietnam's second golden generation. Even though Vietnam managed to reach the semi-finals, they failed to defend the title, losing to Malaysia 0–2 on aggregate. This led to a four-year "dark age" of Vietnamese football, culminating in back-to-back group stage exits in the 2012 edition and the 2013 Southeast Asian Games.

The failure to produce promised performances was further exacerbated by accusations of nepotism and corruption within the national team. At the 2014 AFF Championship, which Vietnam topped their group with a win over the Philippines, the team was suddenly defeated in a shock 2–4 home loss to Malaysia despite winning 2–1 away earlier, and was eliminated. Mishandling was another factor leading to Vietnam's deterioration of performance, as seen with three managers being replaced in just a short amount of time.

While the national team did eventually show some signs of resurgence after hiring Toshiya Miura in 2014, Vietnam was still eliminated in the 2016 AFF Championship semi-final after losing to Indonesia at home and most humiliatingly, the 2017 SEA Games at group stage.

Only after the successful performance of the youth team in the 2018 AFC U-23 Championship and emergence of new talents from this competition did Vietnamese football start to reclaim its place, marking the end of eight years of darkness. Vietnam won the 2018 AFF Championship and reached the last eight of the 2019 AFC Asian Cup.
