= 2013 Philippine Peace Cup =

Tournament details
- Host country: Philippines
- Dates: October 11–15
- Teams: 3 (from 1 confederation)
- Venue(s): 1 (in 1 host city)

Final positions
- Champions: Philippines (2nd title)
- Runners-up: Chinese Taipei
- Third place: Pakistan

Tournament statistics
- Matches played: 3
- Goals scored: 8 (2.67 per match)

The 2013 Philippine Peace Cup was the second edition of the tournament, an international football competition organized by the Philippine Football Federation (PFF) to celebrate peace month in the country through football. This edition involved the national teams of the Philippines and only two invitees instead of three. It was held in Bacolod, Negros Occidental from October 11–15, 2013.

== Participants ==
New Caledonia, Kyrgyzstan and an unspecified team from the 2012 Philippine Peace Cup were initially mooted as participants. On September 24, the PFF announced that Chinese Taipei, runners-up in the previous edition of the tournament had confirmed their participation. They also sent an invitation to the Federation of Uganda Football Associations, but they turned it down citing the expensive airfare and the bad timing due to having other commitments.

The Rwandese Association Football Federation (FERWAFA) were another invitee and the PFF claimed that they were close to finalizing their participation. However, the FERWAFA stated that they hadn't made any decision and had to check if they had budget to compete in the tournament. On September 27, the FERWAFA confirmed that they had arranged an international friendly match against Uganda on October 15, thus ruling them out of the tournament.

The following day, it was announced that Pakistan would be participating in the tournament. The PFF then stated that only three teams would be involved. Burundi and 2013 SAFF Championship winners Afghanistan were also considered as invitees.

== Venue ==
Bacolod
Panaad Stadium	Panaad Stadium (Philippines)
Capacity: 20,000	Panaad Stadium (Philippines)

== Matches ==
Team	Pld	W	D	L	GF	GA	GD	Pts
Philippines	2	1	0	1	4	3	+1	3
Chinese Taipei	2	1	0	1	2	2	0	3
Pakistan	2	1	0	1	2	3	−1	3

All times listed are UTC+8.

October 11, 2013
19:00

Philippines	1–2	Chinese Taipei
J. Younghusband 45+3'	Report	Li Mao 14'; Lin Chang-lun 65'

Panaad Stadium, Bacolod
Referee: Suhaizi Shukri (Malaysia)

October 13, 2013
16:00

Chinese Taipei	0–1	Pakistan
	Report	Rehman 7'

Panaad Stadium, Bacolod
Referee: Wilfredo Bermejo (Philippines)

October 15, 2013
19:00

Philippines	3–1	Pakistan
Reichelt 33'; Greatwich 78'; Schröck 88'	Report	Kalim 15'

Panaad Stadium, Bacolod
Referee: Heru Santoso (Indonesia)

== Awards ==
2013 Philippine Peace Cup champions

Philippines
Second title

== Goalscorers ==
1 goal

- (Chinese Taipei) Li Mao
- (Chinese Taipei) Lin Chang-lun
- (Pakistan) Zesh Rehman
- (Pakistan) Kalim Ullah
- (Philippines) Chris Greatwich
- (Philippines) Patrick Reichelt
- (Philippines) Stephan Schröck
- (Philippines) James Younghusband
