= Philippine Peace Cup =

Four-nation international football tournament in the Philippines

- Founded: 2012
- Abolished: 2014
- Teams: 3–4
- Last champions: Myanmar (1st title)
- Most championships: Philippines (2 titles)
- Broadcaster: ABS-CBN Sports and Action

The Philippine Peace Cup was a four-nation international football competition organized by the Philippine Football Federation (PFF) which involved the national teams of the Philippines and three invitees. The inaugural edition took place in 2012, replacing the annual Long Teng Cup. The tournament took place around September to celebrate peace month in the Philippines.

== Tournament name ==
The 2012 edition of the third annual Long Teng Cup was given to Philippines by the Chinese Taipei Football Association (CTFA). The PFF then renamed it as the Paulino Alcántara Cup, after Filipino–Spanish football legend who played for Barcelona. It was again renamed to the Paulino Alcántara Peace Cup, and eventually to the Philippine Peace Cup, in accordance to a rule against events being named after an individual by the Philippine Sports Commission, which operates the Rizal Memorial Stadium where the tournament was held. As the tournament celebrated peace month, the presidential adviser on the country's peace process played a role in the naming.

== Broadcasting ==
ABS-CBN was the official TV partner of the Peace Cup, airing the matches involving the Philippines on Studio 23 and other matches via international broadcasters, from 2012 to 2013. Starting from 2014, ABS-CBN Sports and Action aired the games.

== Summary ==
Year	Host city	1st place	2nd place	3rd place	4th place
2012	Manila	Philippines	Chinese Taipei	Guam	Macau
2013	Bacolod	Philippines	Chinese Taipei	Pakistan	—
2014	Manila	Myanmar	Philippines	Palestine	Chinese Taipei

== General statistics ==
As of 2014 Philippine Peace Cup

Team	Pld	W	D	L	GF	GA	GD
Philippines	7	5	0	2	20	8	+12
Chinese Taipei	7	2	1	4	11	19	-8
Myanmar	2	2	0	0	7	3	+4
Palestine	2	1	0	1	8	7	+1
Guam	3	1	0	2	3	3	0
Pakistan	2	1	0	1	2	3	-1
Macau	3	0	1	2	2	10	-8
