= Philippines national football team results (1913–1948) =

This is a list of the Philippines national football team results from 1913 to 1948.

== 1913 ==
February 4 1913 Far Eastern Championship Games	Philippines	2–1	China	Manila, Philippines
	Manuel Nieto (?) Damaso García (?)	Report	Tong Fuk Cheung (?)	Stadium: Carnival Grounds

== 1915 ==
May 17 1915 Far Eastern Championship Games	China	1–0	Philippines	Shanghai, China
	Wong Pak Chung 36'	Report		Stadium: Hongkou Park

May 18 1915 Far Eastern Championship Games	China	0–0	Philippines	Shanghai, China
		Report		Stadium: Hongkou Park

May 20 1915 Far Eastern Championship Games	China	1–1	Philippines	Shanghai, China
	Yip Kwai Seng (?)	Report	? (?)	Stadium: Hongkou Park

== 1917 ==
May 10 1917 Far Eastern Championship Games	Japan	2–15	Philippines	Tokyo, Japan
	Fuji (?)	Report	Alcántara (?); Altonaga (?); Llamas (?); Marco (?) scorers of the last 10 goals (?)	Stadium: Shibaura Ground; Referee: Wiles

May 11 1917 Far Eastern Championship Games	China	3–0 abandoned	Philippines	Tokyo, Japan
	Yip Kwan 5'; Tong Fuk Cheung 10', 55' (pen.)	Report		Stadium: Shibaura Ground; Referee: Wiles

== 1919 ==
May 12 1919 Far Eastern Championship Games	Philippines	0–2	China	Manila, Philippines
		Report	Au Kit Sang (?); Wong Pak Chung (?)	Stadium: Nozaleda Park

May 13 1919 Far Eastern Championship Games	Philippines	2–1	China	Manila, Philippines
	Lobregat (?); Marco (?)	Report	Au Kit Sang 55'	Stadium: Nozaleda Park

May 15 1919 Far Eastern Championship Games	Philippines	1–2	China	Manila, Philippines
	López (?)	Report	Kwok Po Kan (?); Wong Pak Chung (?)	Stadium: Nozaleda Park

== 1921 ==
May 30 1921 Far Eastern Championship Games	Philippines	3–1	Japan	Shanghai, China
	unknown (?); unknown (?); unknown (?)	Report	Goto 7'	Stadium: Hongkou Park; Referee: A. H. Leslie

June 2 1921 Far Eastern Championship Games	China	1–0	Philippines	Shanghai, China
	Ip Kau-Ko 37'	Report		Stadium: Hongkou Park; Referee: W.C.G. Clifford

== 1923 ==
May 22 1923 Far Eastern Championship Games	China	3–0	Philippines	Osaka, Japan
	Pang Kam Wing 7'; Ip Kau Ko 20', 22'	Report		Stadium: Chiko Municipal Stadium; Referee: H. Takeuchi (Japan)

May 23 1923 Far Eastern Championship Games	Japan	1–2	Philippines	Osaka, Japan
	Shimizu 5'	Report	Estava (?); Vallejo 45'	Stadium: Chiko Municipal Stadium; Referee: H. Takeuchi (Japan)

== 1925 ==
May 18 1925 Far Eastern Championship Games	Philippines	4–0	Japan	Manila, Philippines
		Report		Stadium: Rizal Memorial Stadium; Referee: F. Alcántara (Philippines)

May 20 1925 Far Eastern Championship Games	Philippines	1–5	China	Manila, Philippines
	? 45' (pen.)	Report	Lee Wai Tong 10', 25', 51'; Pang Wah Hing 15'; Suen Kam Shun 61'	Stadium: Rizal Memorial Stadium; Attendance: 30,000; Referee: F. Alcántara (Philippines)

== 1927 ==
August 29 1927 Far Eastern Championship Games	Japan	2–1	Philippines	Shanghai, China
	Suzuki 70' Takenokoshi 75'	Report	? (?)	Stadium: Zhonghua Stadium; Referee: Du Lianke (China)

August 31 1927 Far Eastern Championship Games	China	3–1	Philippines	Shanghai, China
	Suen Kam Shun (?); Chen Huanxian (?)	Report	Lallana (?)	Stadium: Zhonghua Stadium; Referee: Du Lianke (China)

== 1930 ==
May 25 1930 Far Eastern Championship Games	Japan	7–2	Philippines	Tokyo, Japan
	Wakabayashi 10', 12', 22', 51'; 16' (o.g.); Teshima 32'; Ichihashi 86'	Report (RSSSF); JFA	Pacheco (?)	Stadium: Meiji Jingu Gaien Stadium; Attendance: 30,000

May 27 1930 Far Eastern Championship Games	China	5–0	Philippines	Tokyo, Japan
	Dai Linjing 14', 27', 30'; Ye Beihua (?); Suen Kam Shun (?)	Report		Stadium: Meiji Jingu Gaien Stadium; Attendance: 36,000; Referee: Hirosaburo Takeuchi (Japan)

== 1934 ==
May 12 1934 Far Eastern Championship Games	China	2–0	Philippines	Manila, Philippines
	Tam Kong-pak (?); Lee Wai-tong (?)	Report		Stadium: Rizal Memorial Stadium; Attendance: 40,000; Referee: Manuel Amechazurra

May 15 1934 Far Eastern Championship Games	Japan	4–3	Philippines	Manila, Philippines
	Kawamoto 30'; Otani 47'; Nishimura 52'; Nozawa 67'	Report	1' ? 14' ? 15' ?	Stadium: Rizal Memorial Stadium

May 19 1934 Far Eastern Championship Games	Philippines	3–2	Dutch East Indies	Manila, Philippines
	Guttierez (?); Heredia (?); Azaola (?)	Report	S. Lontoh (?)	Stadium: Rizal Memorial Stadium

== 1940 ==
June 8 1940 East Asian Games	Republic of China	2–1	Philippines	Tokyo, Japan
		Report		Stadium: Meiji Jingu Gaien Stadium

June ? 1940 East Asian Games	Manchukuo	1–1	Philippines	Japan
		Report

June 16 1940 East Asian Games	Japan	1–0	Philippines	Nishinomiya, Japan
		Report		Stadium: Koshien South Ground
