= China national football team results (1913–1949) =

This article lists the results for the China national football team between 1913 and 1949. Scores are listed with the Chinese score first, followed by the opponents' score.

Key
Win
Draw
Defeat

== 1910s ==
Date	Venue	Opponents	Score	Competition	Scorers
5 February 1913	Manila, Philippines	Philippines	1–2	1913 Far Eastern Championship Games	Tong Fuk Cheung
17 May 1915	Shanghai, China	Philippines	1–0	1915 Far Eastern Championship Games	Wong Pak Chung
18 May 1915	Shanghai, China	Philippines	0–0	1915 Far Eastern Championship Games	
19 May 1915	Shanghai, China	Philippines	1–1	1915 Far Eastern Championship Games	Yip Kwai Sam
9 May 1917	Tokyo, Japan	Japan	5–0	1917 Far Eastern Championship Games	Kwok Po Kan, Tong Fuk Cheung, Fung Kin Wai (3)
9 May 1917	Tokyo, Japan	Philippines	3–0	1917 Far Eastern Championship Games	Ye Kun, Tong Fuk Cheung (2)
12 May 1919	Manila, Philippines	Philippines	2–0	1919 Far Eastern Championship Games	Tong Fuk Cheung, Wong Pak Chung
13 May 1919	Manila, Philippines	Philippines	1–2	1919 Far Eastern Championship Games	Wong Pak Chung
15 May 1919	Manila, Philippines	Philippines	2–1	1919 Far Eastern Championship Games	Kwok Po Kan, Wong Pak Chung

== 1920s ==
Date	Venue	Opponents	Score	Competition	Scorers
31 May 1921	Shanghai, China	Philippines	1–0	1921 Far Eastern Championship Games	Yip Kau Ko
1 June 1921	Shanghai, China	Japan	4–0	1921 Far Eastern Championship Games	Yip Kau Ko, Wong Pak Chung, Aw Kit Sang, ?
22 May 1923	Osaka, Japan	Philippines	3–0	1923 Far Eastern Championship Games	Wong Pak Chung, ?, ?
24 May 1923	Osaka, Japan	Japan	5–1	1923 Far Eastern Championship Games	Wong Pak Chung (2), Yip Kau Ko (3)
18 August 1923	Sydney, Australia	Australia	1–5	Friendly	Lee Wai Tong
25 August 1923	Newcastle, Australia	Australia	3–4	Friendly	Wong Pak Chung (2), Lee Wai Tong
15 September 1923	Brisbane, Australia	Australia	0–5	Friendly	
22 September 1923	Sydney, Australia	Australia	3–1	Friendly	Chang Hsi En, Lee Wai Tong (2)
29 September 1923	Melbourne, Australia	Australia	0–2	Friendly	
6 October 1923	Adelaide, Australia	Australia	2–2	Friendly	Chang Hsi En, Lee Wai Tong
15 December 1923	Hong Kong	Hong Kong	1–1	Friendly	Wong Pak Chung
FIFA-affiliated era
20 May 1925	Manila, Philippines	Japan	2–0	1925 Far Eastern Championship Games	Lee Wai Tong (2)
22 May 1925	Manila, Philippines	Philippines	5–1	1925 Far Eastern Championship Games	Lee Wai Tong (3), Pang Wah Hing, Suen Kam Shun
18 June 1927	Adelaide, Australia	Australia	3–0	Friendly	
2 July 1927	Sydney, Australia	Australia	2–6	Friendly	
9 July 1927	Sydney, Australia	Australia	1–6	Friendly	Chan Kwong Yiu
16 July 1927	Newcastle, Australia	Australia	4–7	Friendly	Fung King Cheong (2), Lee Wai Tong, Chan Kwong Yiu
23 July 1927	Hobart, Australia	Australia	1–1	Friendly	Lee Wai Tong
27 August 1927	Shanghai, China	Japan	5–1	1927 Far Eastern Championship Games	Suen Kam Shun (2), Cai Bingfen (3)
31 August 1927	Shanghai, China	Philippines	3–1	1927 Far Eastern Championship Games	Suen Kam Shun (2), Chen Huanxian

== 1930s ==
Date	Venue	Opponents	Score	Competition	Scorers
27 May 1930	Tokyo, Japan	Philippines	5–0	1930 Far Eastern Championship Games	Dai Linjing (3), Ye Beihua, Suen Kam Shun
29 May 1930	Tokyo, Japan	Japan	3–3	1930 Far Eastern Championship Games	Suen Kam Shun, Chan Kwong Yiu, Dai Linjing
12 May 1934	Manila, Philippines	Philippines	2–0	1934 Far Eastern Championship Games	Tam Kong Pak, Lee Wai Tong
14 May 1934	Manila, Philippines	Dutch East Indies	2–0	1934 Far Eastern Championship Games	Tso Kwai Shing, Fung King Cheong
20 May 1934	Manila, Philippines	Japan	4–3	1934 Far Eastern Championship Games	Tam Kong Pak (2), Lee Wai Tong (2)
8 July 1936	Calcutta, British India	(British Raj) India	1–1	Friendly	Suen Kam Shun
6 August 1936	Berlin, Germany	Great Britain	0–2	1936 Summer Olympics	
2 September 1939	Hsinking, Manchukuo	Japan	1–6	Japan–Manchuria–China Friendship Games	
4 September 1942	Hsinking, Manchukuo	Manchukuo	Unknown	Japan–Manchuria–China Friendship Games	

== 1940s ==
Date	Venue	Opponents	Score	Competition	Scorers
7 June 1940	Tokyo, Japan	Philippines	2–2	1940 East Asia Games	
8 June 1940	Tokyo, Japan	Japan	0–6	1940 East Asia Games	
15 June 1940	Nishinomiya, Japan	Manchukuo	0–1	1940 East Asia Games	
8 August 1942	Hsinking, Manchukuo	Japan	1–6	1942 East Asia Games	
9 August 1942	Hsinking, Manchukuo	Mengjiang	Unknown	1942 East Asia Games	
10 August 1942	Hsinking, Manchukuo	Manchukuo	1–3	1942 East Asia Games	
13 May 1948	Bangkok, Thailand	Thailand	5–0	Friendly	Ho Ying Fun, Li Tai Fai, Kwok Ying Kee, Lai Shiu Wing, Chau Man Chi
22 May 1948	Singapore	Singapore	0–1	Friendly	
27 June 1948	Singapore	(Malaysia) Malaya	3–0	Friendly	Chu Wing Keong (2), Chau Man Chi
7 July 1948	Singapore	Singapore	4–3	Friendly	Chu Wing Keong (2), Chau Man Chi, Kwok Ying Kee
17 July 1948	Calcutta, India	India	0–1	Friendly	
25 July 1948	London, Great Britain	United States	3–2	Friendly	Ho Ying Fun (2), Chu Wing Keong
2 August 1948	London, Great Britain	Turkey	0–4	1948 Summer Olympics	
2 January 1949	Hong Kong, Great Britain	Korea	3–2	Friendly	

== Head-to-head records ==
China national football team head-to-head records (1913–1949)
Opponent	Pld	W	D	L	GF	GA	GD	Pts	Confederation
Australia	7	1	1	5	13	26	–13	4	OFC
Great Britain	1	0	0	1	0	2	–2	0	UEFA
India	1	0	0	1	0	1	–1	0	AFC
Dutch East Indies	1	1	0	0	2	0	+2	3	AFC
Japan	7	4	1	2	20	16	+4	13	AFC
Korea	1	1	0	0	3	2	+1	3	AFC
Malaya	1	1	0	0	3	0	+3	3	AFC
Philippines	10	7	2	1	23	7	+16	23	AFC
Singapore	2	1	0	1	4	4	0	3	AFC
Thailand	1	1	0	0	5	0	+5	3	AFC
Turkey	1	0	0	1	0	4	–4	0	UEFA
United States	1	1	0	0	3	2	+1	3	CONCACAF
Total	34	18	4	12	76	64	+12	58	
