= Joaquín Loyzaga =

Filipino footballer

Joaquín Loyzaga Sr.
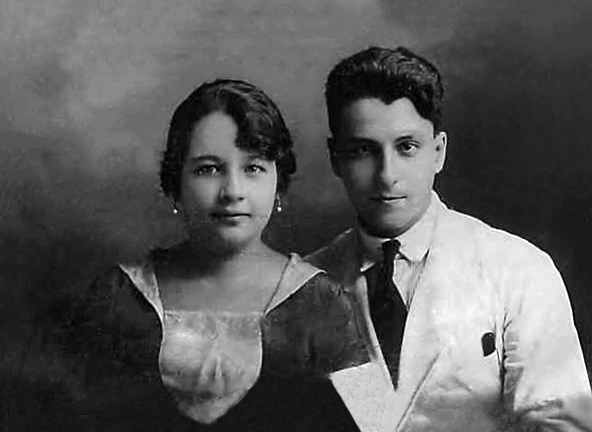
- Passport application of Loyzaga (right) with his wife Carmen Matute, 1922

Personal information
- Full name: Joaquín de Loyzaga Martínez
- Date of birth: April 18, 1898
- Place of birth: Manila, Captaincy General of the Philippines
- Date of death: July 3, 1935 (aged 37)
- Place of death: Manila, Philippine Islands
- Positions: Defender; goalkeeper

Senior career*
Years	Team	Apps	(Gls)
1915-1927	Bohemian		

International career
1913–1921	Philippines		
Medal record
Philippines
Far Eastern Championship Games
Gold medal – first place	1913 Manila	Team
Silver medal – second place	1915 Shanghai	Team
Silver medal – second place	1917 Tokyo	Team
Silver medal – second place	1919 Manila	Team
Silver medal – second place	1921 Shanghai	Team
- * Club domestic league appearances and goals

Joaquín Loyzaga Sr. (born Joaquín de Loyzaga Martínez; April 18, 1898 – July 3, 1935) was a Filipino international footballer who has covered both the roles of defender and goalkeeper making himself known, in modern day terms, as a utility player. He was one of the legends and one of the best players of the pre-war football era, having won multiple National Championships he was also one of the most decorated one. He played for Bohemian S.C. and represented the, then called Philippine Islands football team in the Far Eastern Championship Games, the precursor of the Asian Games.

== Club career ==
=== Bohemian Sporting Club ===
Loyzaga played for Bohemian Sporting Club from the mid 1910s to the 1920s and was one of the longest serving players of the club. Loyzaga as a Bohemian was part of the dominant side that won the four-peat, winning the National Philippine Football Championship four times in a row in 1915, 1916, 1917 and 1918- During those years, as well as the years after, thanks to his all-around talent on the field he partnered alongside Manuel Nieto in defense and together formed what was backbone of the Bohemian team. After a brief stop in 1919, as no championship was held, he won another three consecutive titles in 1920, 1921 and 1922. His longevity made it possible for him to still be determinant from the backline after a renewed strong side with the Villareal brothers and won a final title 1927. Those victories, added with his defensive abilities, made him one the star of the "Crack" Bohemian team and became one of the most decorated players of his era. He was a "one-club man" and one of the very first in Philippines football history. During his tenure at Bohemian, Loyzaga, represented the Philippine Islands football team in four editions of the Far Eastern Championship Games.

== International career ==
=== 1915 and 1917 Far Eastern Championship Games ===
In the 1915 Shanghai Far Eastern Games Loyzaga played as a goalkeeper. The first game was a rough one against the Chinese, with whom the Filipinos had bad blood with due to the accusations in the previous edition and ended with each team having a player sent off. The match was played under the rain, which was making the pitch greasy and often stopping the ball in puddles of water. The game ended 0-1 in favor of the Chinese whose goal was contested by captain and Bohemian teammate Joaquín "Chacho" López who appealed that it was offside to no avail. The second game Loyzaga was able to keep a clean sheet preventing the opponents to score but it ended with a 0-0 draw. The third game was important as the Philippines needed a win to take it to a fourth game but it ended in another draw as the Filipinos scored only an equaliser in the last minutes, proving the first game to be the decisive one and brought home a silver medal.

Loyzaga took part in the 1917 Tokyo edition where he showed his versatility playing as a defender and helped the national team win 15–2 over Japan in what was and still is Philippines biggest win in an international match. Although Loyzaga and teammates won impressevly, they lost against China and finished second.

=== 1919 and 1921 Far Eastern Championship Games ===
The 1919 Manila Far East Games saw Loyzaga and the Philippines play three competitive matches against rival China, losing the first, due to crucial mistakes, but winning the second one with a 2-1 score. After the Filipinos were leading with two goals at half time, which were scored by Bohemian teammates Lobregat and Ramon Marco, China's Au Kit Sang scored and he along his team tried to equalise the game by attacking costantly. The Filipinos were able to hold on and in the last minutes of the game Loyzaga, who played as a defender, proved to be determinant as he headed away the ball on one China's attempt that was surpassing the goal-line, saving the result and taking the team to a third meeting that would have decided the champions. The final game saw the Philippines leading 1-0 at half time but the Chinese were able to turn in around winning 1-2 and giving Loyzaga another silver medal.

Loyzaga played his last Far Eastern Championship games in 1921 in Shanghai and after defeating Japan 3-1, he and his teammates lost once again against China with a 0-1 result. In each edition of the Far East Games he was able to capture a silver medal.

== Personal life ==
He was born to José Antonio Eugenio de Loyzaga y Ageo, a wealthy criollo businessman and sixth-generation member of landed Old Manila gentry, and María de la Luz Martínez Vial, a middle-class criolla. He was married to María del Carmen Matute y Sequera, who herself was a well-to-do ninth-generation criolla. He is the father of Carlos Loyzaga who is considered the greatest Filipino basketball player of all time. Carlos was initially involved in football.

At the inaugural Manila Youth Games in 2002, plaques of recognition of select athletes from Manila, including Loyzaga, were presented.

== Honors ==
Bohemian S.C.

- United States Philippines Championship (8): 1915, 1916, 1917, 1918, 1920, 1921, 1922, 1927

Philippine national football team

- Far Eastern Championship Games: (Silver medal) 1915, 1917, 1919, 1921
