= Bohemian S.C. =

Filipino football club

Bohemian Sporting Club
- Emblem in black and white (exact colors unknown)
- Full name: Bohemian Sporting Club Manila 1910
- Nicknames: The Bohemians; The Red Sashed
- Short name: Bohemian Manila; Bohemian SC; Bohemian; BSC
- Founded: 1910
- Dissolved: 1930s

Bohemian Sporting Club was a Filipino football club based in Manila, Philippines. It was founded in 1910 and was one of the first clubs to be established within the country. The club, during the earliest phases of football in the Philippines, imposed its dominance in the country, winning 10 national championships in the early decades of the 1900s.

After ceasing to exist by the 1930s, due to the socio-political shifts in the Philippines as a colony, then as an independent nation, followed by the breakout and aftermath of the second World War, a group whose headed by chairman Jason de Jong formed, in 2017, a football school and an academy as a tribute to the legendary club. In 2018 the group launched on the field its football club, adopting the historical club's emblem to honor the success of its history. The new Bohemian Sporting Club's ownership group now operates in developing the youths by giving them the opportunity to play in various tournaments, while the men's amateur senior team also participated in the 7s Football League in 2019 and 2020, a 7-a-side football league based in Manila.

== History ==
=== Early history ===
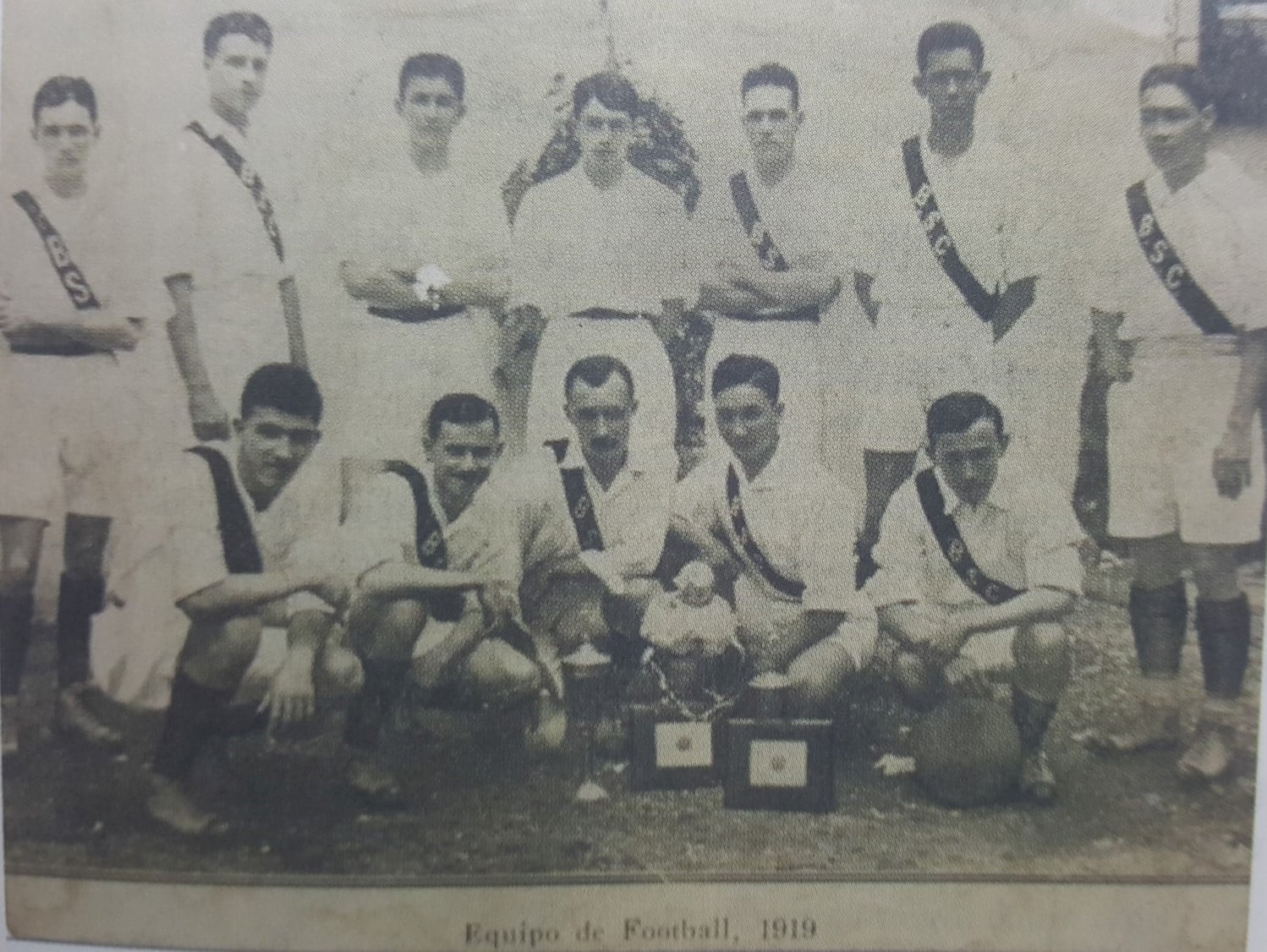
The Bohemian team, in 1919, posing with some silverware.

Established in 1910, it was, alongside the Manila Jockey Club (1900s), Manila Sporting Club (1906), Sandow Athletic Club (1906), Manila Nomads Sports Club (1914) and Aurora Athletic Club (1910s) one of the pioneers of football in the Philippines.

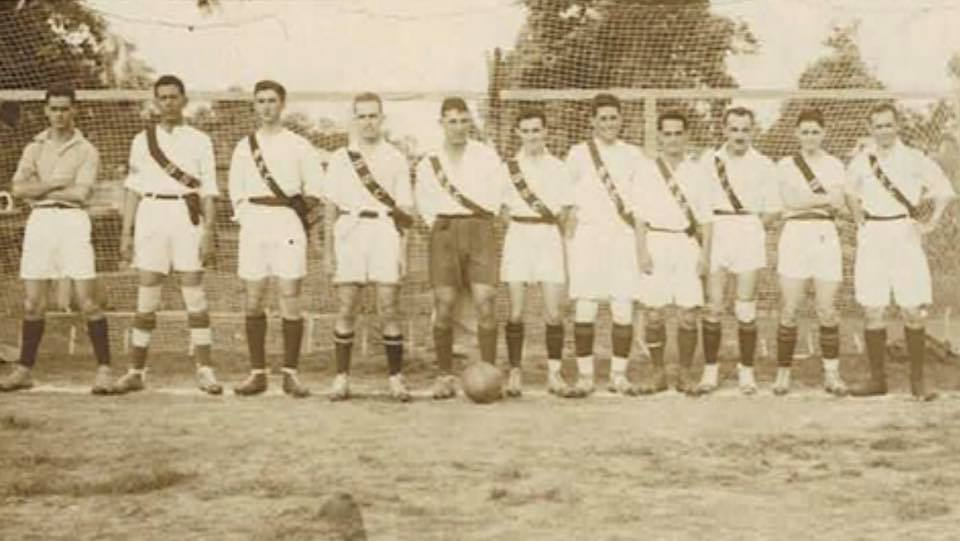
Bohemian SC team photo in the 20s

After football was introduced in the Philippines by English sportsmen, right before the beginning of the 20th Century, football clubs started to be formed, and the first few matches started to take place. The popularity of the game rose to the point that a National Football Championship, the first ever in the country, was organised in 1911. Bohemian SC became the second football club to be crowned as "Champion of the Philippines" in 1912 as the previous and first ever Filipino champion was All Manila. In 1913 Bohemian added to their tally a first "continental" success winning, by 3 goals to 1, the "Campeonato del Carnaval" against South China AA and successfully defended their Philippine title winning it back to back. The Bohemians, in 1914, failed to defend their crown and complete a three-peat, as a club founded in the same year, Nomads SC was able to dethrone the mighty team and win the National Championship, becoming also the first to do so and the third ever Filipino club champion. Bohemian SC wasted no time in showing the newly champions and the other clubs which one ruled the national football scene, as the Bohemians regained the title in 1915 as well in 1916 and were reinforced by Paulino Alcántara who helped them, not only, win a three-peat in 1917 but also complete a four-peat in 1918. In that year, a certain Virgilio Lobregat, who was still a teenager, was also present.

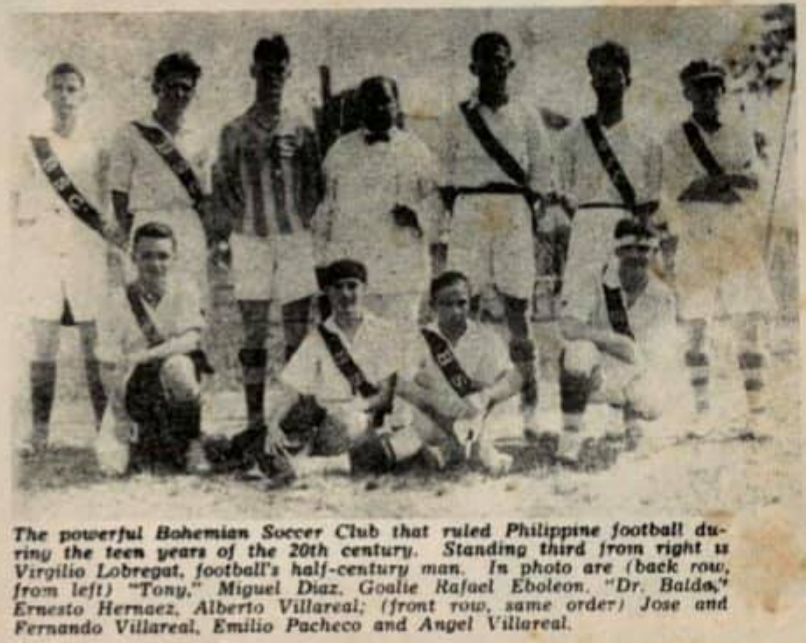
Bohemian SC team photo, 1925

Right after Alcántara left the club to return to play for the Culés, he took over and led Bohemian to a second three-peat to start the new decade, winning the title in 1920, 1921 and 1922. In those years the National Championship started to feature foreign clubs which were making it difficult for the Bohemians, also furthered by the fact that a lot of the veteran players stopped playing for the club as they got older. Filipino football saw different champions before Bohemian but, still led by Lobregat, it won its tenth Philippine National Championship in 1927. When all the club's best players, from Lobregat, Chacho López, Manolo Nieto, Loyzaga all to the Villareals, faded out it was then that some new stars at the club of the likes of Paquito Gutierrez, Emilio Ugarte, Long Ortigas, Mendez, Alegre and others started to take over and defend the colours of the club.

=== Revival ===
Former Philippine national team player Jason de Jong and his group began talks in 2017 regarding the possible revival of the Bohemian Sporting Club. The following year the ownership group established the Bohemian Football School and the BSC academy in honor of Paulino Alcántara and the story of the club as a vehicle to draw in youth players to develop for the club. In 2018 the name, the crest of Bohemian SC resurfaced on the football pitch for the firsts times, after more than 80 years, through the youth academy teams, and it immediately saw an early success as, some of them were able to win the Aboitiz Cup and the Agila Cup in their respective categories.

The group sent its men's amateur team to join the amateur 7's Football League, a Metro Manila-based 7-a-side football league and debuted in the third season of the competition in 2019. Among the players of the Bohemian side there were some UFL and PFL players such as Izzeldin Elhabib, Hamed Hajimehdi and former Philippine national team player as well as chairman of the club Jason de Jong. The group has stated that it plans to organize a first team for the club in the next years as it intends to be, firstly, sustainable before launching themselves to the professional football world.

== Colours and badge ==
Plain kit with a Red Sash

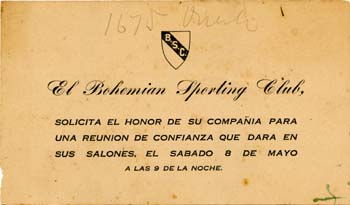
A postal card from the early decades of the 20th century where the emblem of the club is portrayed. The black and white logo was based on this.

The original and accurate social colours of Bohemian SC are still, to this day, yet to be known. However, it is known that the players' jerseys were characterized by a red diagonal stripe that crossed it, along with the acronym of the club (B.S.C.) written on it. Like the jersey, the logo, which resembled the form of a shield, was crossed by a diagonal shape with the initials of the team's name. While it was possible that the tint was the same for the club's logo its colouring is not reported either as the only proof available is a century old postcard printed black on white, hence why the digital version of the club's logo was posted in monochrome. Nonetheless, it is known that the red stripe played an important role as it resembled and looked like a red sash, giving the Bohemians their nickname and making themselves known as The Red Sashed. Since the members (Los Socios) of the club were of Spanish origins and spoke the language, it was a possibility that they gave themselves the appellative of La Banda Roja or La Franja Roja, both a translation of the English version.

The decline in popularity for football in the Philippines, made it so that a lot of information about the historic club came to be very minimal and majority of its details went forgotten nor reported. Photographic materials about the club are also all in black and white. In 2018, since the colours were not known, the board of the revived Bohemian club, adopted what they assumed them to be, along with the monochrome crest while adding above it a star to symbolize the old club's storied achievement of winning ten Philippines National Championships. The club, in the various competitions of every category its teams joined, consequently utilized white for the home kit one and black for the away kit, while also combining the two colors.

Home kit example 1	Away kit example 1	Home kit example 2	Away kit example 2

== Club rivalries ==
=== Derbies of the old Manila ===
Bohemian was the strongest Filipino football team around in between the decades of the 1910s and 1920s, dominating the National scene. In football, regardless of winning or not, it is commonly known that rivalries between clubs are very significant and, no matter what, are destined to be formed. They are, for the most part, what mostly create a sense of passion, identity and loyalty towards the teams. The Red Sashed was not exempt from these and despite the fact they were constant winners of the league, they were contested by Manila teams such as Sandow and Nomad, the other "English" teams who were challenging the Bohemians through the years with the Nomads who were able to dethrone them once in 1914 and were the first to do so. Above them, however, was the Manila derby against Aurora Athletic Club which was the team, among all, that was always the closest on the conquest of the title with Bohemian and their rivalry characterized the sport in those decades. This specific derby was also fueled by the rivalry between one of the captains and leaders of the Red Sashed Manuel "Manolo" Nieto and Aurora's forward Solano who was the only one who was able to dribble past the greatest Filipino defender of the pre-war era.

=== Rivalry with South China AA ===
Another strong rivalry was with South China AA, yet a game between Bohemian and the "Shaolin Temple" only happened right after the 1913 Far Eastern Championship Games for the "Campeonato del Carnaval" which the Bohemians were able to take home after winning the match with 3 goals scored to 1. The rivalry was mainly between the players of the Red Sashed and the Caroliners who represented respectively the Philippines (1913 to 1925) and China (1913 to 1934) in the Far Eastern Championship Games. It began in the first edition when the China representants accused the Philippine players of not being natives of the country and viewed them as a sign of oppression. So a fierce rivalry developed between the National teams and whenever the two sides played a game against each other violent instances occurred through the years.

== Honors ==
Type	Competition	Titles	Seasons
Domestic	Philippines National Championship	10	1912, 1913, 1915, 1916, 1917, 1918, 1920, 1921, 1922, 1927
Continental	Campeonato del Carnaval	1	1913

- Record

== Players ==
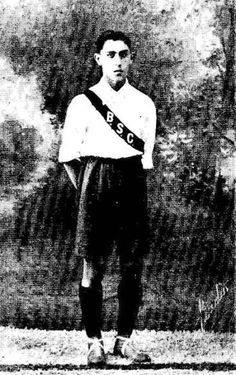
Paulino Alcántara in a Bohemian SC kit. He was awarded by the PFF the "Centennial Award for the Most Outstanding Player of the Pre-War Era" and was recognized by FIFA as "Greatest Asian player of all-time" in 2007. The Philippine national cup tournament was named after him.

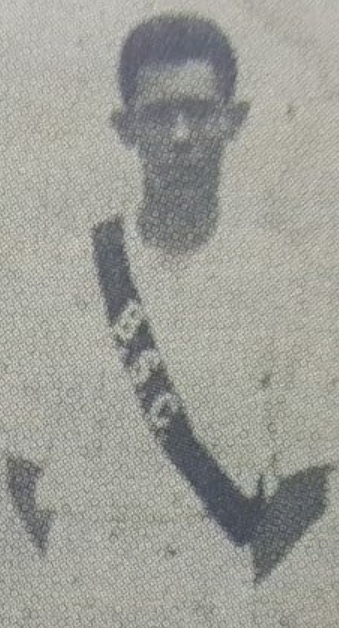
Virgilio Lobregat was awarded by the PFF the title of "Football Player of the Half Century" and by the PAAF as one of the "Outstanding Athletes of Half-A-Century":

Player	International player for	Position	Bohemian career^{1}	Trophies won at Bohemian^{2}	Ref.
German Montserrat	Philippines	GK	1912-1919^{3}	7^{3}	
L. Lara	Philippines	DF	1912-1913^{3}	3^{3}	
Enrique Lopez	Philippines	MF	1912-1913^{3}	3^{3}	
Jose Llamas	Philippines	FW	1912-1919^{3}	3^{3}	
Jesús Cacho	Philippines	FW	1912-1919^{3}	7^{3}	
Joaquín "Chacho" López	Philippines	MF	1912-1925^{3}	10^{3}	
Manuel Nieto	Philippines	FW/DF	1912-1919^{3}	7^{3}	
Joaquín Loyzaga	Philippines	GK/DF	1915-1921	6	
Federico Garcia	Philippines	MF	1915-1921	6	
Eduardo Rodriguez	Philippines	—	1915	1	
Ramon Marco	Philippines	FW	1915-1919	4	
Ricardo Aldana	Philippines	—	1915	1	
Luis Moreno	Philippines	MF	1915-1917	3	
Ricardo Garcia	Philippines	—	1915-1917	3	
Geronimo Canda	Philippines	—	1915	1	
Paulino Alcántara Riestrá	Catalonia; Philippines; Spain	FW	1916-1918	2	
Eduardo Yrezabal	Philippines	—	1917-1925	5	
Virgilio Lobregat	Philippines	FW	1918-1927	5	
Alberto Villareal	Philippines	FW	1919-1925	3	
Restituto Ynchausti	Philippines	—	1919	—	
Fernando Villareal	Philippines	—	1921-1925	2	
Jesus Cui	Philippines	—	1925	—	
Ernesto Hernaez	Philippines	—	1925	—	
Miguel Diaz	Philippines	—	1925	—	
Angel Villareal	Philippines	FW	1925	—	
Jose "Peping" Villareal	Philippines	—	1925	—	
Emilio "Lolo" Pacheco	Philippines	FW	1925	—	
Rafael Iboleon	Philippines	GK	1925	—	
Paquito Gutierrez	Philippines	—	1931	—	
Emilio Ugarte	Philippines	—	1931	—	
Long Ortigas	Philippines	—	1931	—	
Joaquin? Mendez	Philippines	—	1931	—	
Ramón? Alegre	Philippines	MF?	1931	—	

Notes:

1. The years spent at the club by the players are reported by the "Rec.Sport.Soccer Statistics Foundation" but only during the far eastern games.
2. The number of trophies won by the players are considered only in the period of time the players were at the club per "Rec.Sport.Soccer Statistics Foundation" as the exact years they spent at Bohemian is unknown.
3. Only exception is for the players who participated in the 1913 Far East Games as it took place at the beginning of February and the Philippine team was formed by the members of the 1912 championship team.

=== Bohemian and the Philippines National Football Team ===

1913 Far Eastern Championship Games seven of the gold medalist XI were Bohemians(*)^{a}

1917 Far Eastern Championship Games eight of XI that recorded Philippines biggest win, by margin, were Bohemians(*)^{a}

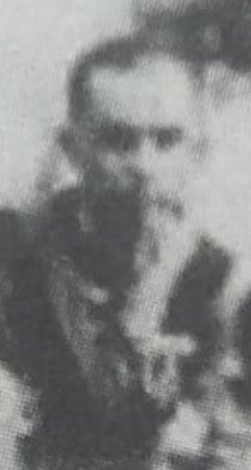
Bohemian's own Joaquín "Chacho" López when he represented the Philippines in his last Far Eastern Games in 1925.

Bohemian Sporting Club ruled Philippines football during the 1910s to the late 1920s and fielded some of the best players of the country, who were often chosen to represent the, then called, Philippine islands in the Far Eastern Championship Games. Among those players, there were Paulino Alcántara who played for the club from 1916 to 1918 and one of FC Barcelona's legends where he played from 1912-27, as well as Virgilio Lobregat who was considered the Philippines’ best player next to the blaugrana great and a Filipino legendary figure himself.

The club, alongside Sandow Athletic Club represented the Philippines in football at the 1913 Far East Games which was held in Manila and were able to win over China, giving the Philippines its only football gold medal in this tournament's history. The gold medalist's team were formed by Bohemian's German Montserrat, L. Lara, Enrique Lopez, Jose Llamas, Jesús Cacho, Joaquín "Chacho" López and Manuel Nieto. After the first edition of the Far Eastern Championship Games was over, Bohemian SC played a match against South China AA, which represented China during the tournament, for the "Campeonato del Carnaval" and came out on top to win one of the first ever interclub football tournament in the Far East.

Bohemian SC, as the football powerhouse of the country, continued to contribute the national team which were fielding its players also in the 1915, 1917(edition where the Philippines recorded its biggest victory, by margin, in an international football match which also became Japan's biggest defeat, finishing the game 2-15), 1919, 1921, 1923 and 1925 editions of the Far East Games but always coming up short in the decisive games against China and ending every edition with a silver medal.

The Bohemian player with the most appearances in this tournament was Joaquín "Chacho" López who participated in every edition starting from 1913 to 1925, every single one while playing for the club.

Note^a: The 2–3–5 formation was the standard by the 1890s up to the 1930s, it was popularized by the English and had spread all over the world.
