= Joaquín López (Filipino footballer) =

Filipino footballer

Joaquín "Chacho" López
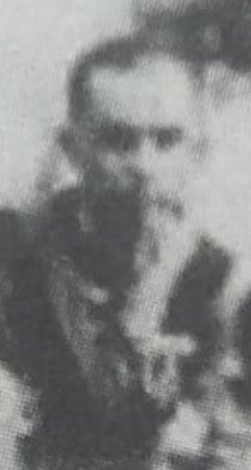
- Chacho López in the 1925 Far eastern games

Personal information
- Birth name: Joaquín López
- Place of birth: Philippine Islands
- Place of death: Philippine Islands
- Position: Midfielder

Senior career*
Years	Team	Apps	(Gls)
1911-1925	Bohemian		

International career
1913–1925	Philippines		
Medal record
Philippines
Far Eastern Championship Games
Gold medal – first place	1913 Manila	Team
Silver medal – second place	1915 Shanghai	Team
Silver medal – second place	1917 Tokyo	Team
Silver medal – second place	1919 Manila	Team
Silver medal – second place	1921 Shanghai	Team
Silver medal – second place	1923 Osaka	Team
Silver medal – second place	1925 Manila	Team
- * Club domestic league appearances and goals

Joaquín López, nicknamed "Chacho" was a Filipino international footballer who played as a midfielder for Bohemian S.C. and for the Philippine Islands football team which he also captained. Chacho López was the most longevous and the most decorated Filipino football player, for both club and country, during the early years of the 1900s. He spent his football career at Bohemian, during the 1910s and 1920s, where he lifted ten trophies (9 National titles and a Campeonato del Carnaval) and was a Filipino international from 1913 to 1925 bringing home seven Far Eastern Championship medals (a Gold and six Silvers). Thanks to his longevity and achievements he is regarded as one of the prewar era Philippine football legends.

== Club career ==
=== Bohemian Sporting Club ===
As the Filipino football scene started to take place and saw the birth of the very firsts Philippine National Championships, Joaquín "Chacho" López found himself to be one of the front runners of the competition, as he immediately was part of the early successes of Bohemian Sporting Club. Bohemian was crowned as the national champions consecutively in 1912 and 1913. In the same year in 1913, after the Far Eastern Championship Games were over, Chacho and the Bohemians faced South China AA and prevailed over them with a 3–1 win result, for the "Campeonato del Carnaval". After winning what was one of the first interclub football tournament, Chacho's Bohemian would lose the title of "National Champions" to the newly founded Manila Nomads Sports Club in 1914 but would regain it back by winning the championship four times in a row in 1915, 1916, 1917 and 1918. In those years Chacho played alongside Paulino Alcántara and Virgilio Lobregat which was present in the year of the four-peat. Right after Paulino left Bohemian to return to Barcelona, Chacho and the new leader upfront Lobregat helped the Bohemians win the National Championship another three times in a row in 1920, 1921 and 1922. After Chacho won his tenth trophy for the club, he would then still be at Bohemian for a few more years.

Chacho's period at Bohemian was reported by the "Rec.Sport.Soccer Statistics Foundation" that listed him as its player during the Far East Games. It is unknown whether Joaquín "Chacho" López retired or left for another club but if he did hung up the boots, that would make him one of the very first "one-club men" in Philippines football history.

== International career ==
=== 1913 Far Eastern Championship Games ===
Joaquín "Chacho" López took part in the very first Far East Games in 1913 in Manila and was part of the Philippine team that won its first and only football gold medal of the tournament's history, besting China and winning the game with a 2–1 score. During the game López and his team were accused by the Chinese for the fact that the Philippines team was made up of Europeans and not native Filipinos and the organisers were able to calm their anger saying that, although the team included players of Spanish origins they had all been born in the Philippines.

=== 1915 Far Eastern Championship Games ===
In the 1915 Shanghai edition, he became the second ever Philippines National Football Team captain while representing the country in a tournament. He captained the team for the three games against China. In the Philippine team were missing some of their better players who were unavailable due to work or injury and had to rely on youngsters from the Bohemian's junior league side. The first game proved to be the decisive one as the Chinese won 1-0 from a Wong Pak Chung header, Chacho López appealed that it was offside to no avail. The match was rough and ended with each team having a player sent off. After that, a fierce rivalry had developed between the teams for the same accusations made from the Chinese in the past edition. The next two games ended in a scoreless draw and a 1-1 draw resulting in a silver medal for the Philippine team.

=== 1917 Far Eastern Championship Games ===
Chacho López, in the 1917 Far East Games in Tokyo, contributed in giving the Philippines National Football Team its biggest victory ever, ending the game with a whopping result of 15–2 over Japan. They played against China after, losing the game 0-3 and as frustration built up, goalkeeper F. Evangelista punched Kwok Po Kan after he scored. López ended up with a second silver medal.

=== 1919 Far Eastern Championship Games ===
The 1919 Far Eastern Championship Games were played in Manila and saw three tough competitive games between the Philippines and China. The first one ended 0–2 in favor of the rivals, in which the home team dominated the first half but failed to score while the Chinese took the second and scored two late goals, both as a result to the Filipinos' mistakes. The first when Jesus Cacho completely missed the ball when attempting to clear and Au Kit San gratefully took his chance and the second when goalkeeper German Montserrat was caught out of position giving Wong Pak Chung an easy tap-in. The second game ended 2–1 in favor of the Filipinos with goals scored by Llobregat and Ramon Marco, but it also saw a great occasion for Chacho López as he dribbled through the Chinese defence to score, only for the referee to disallow the goal for a foul despite the fact that López's head was pouring with blood. The third and decisive match saw Chacho López open the scoring around the middle of the first 35 minute half but despite scoring first, China turned it around to their favour ending the game 2 goals to 1.

=== 1921 and 1923 Far Eastern Championship Games ===
Both of the 1921 Shanghai and 1923 Osaka editions ended again with a fourth and a fifth silver medal for the Philippines and López, losing the games against China. In Osaka a fight broke out between Ng Kam Chuen and Estava while the rest of the players joined in leading to a full-scale battle and members of the crowd were also involved. The police managed to establish order and after calming the teams, the two sides agreed to finish the game.

=== 1925 Far Eastern Championship Games ===
Joaquín "Chacho" López participated in his last Far East Games in 1925 held in the city where it first started, in Manila and ended his international career with a last silver medal, once again to the hands of China. Lee Wai Tong recognized the strength of the Filipino team as he stated that 'the Philippines have better individual players than China, but we are a better team'.

Chacho after taking part to all the editions of the Far Eastern Championship Games from 1913 up to 1925, he became the Filipino football player with the most appearances in the competition, as well as, the most longevous Filipino international player and the player with the most medals.

== Honors ==
Bohemian S.C.

- United States Philippines Championship (9): 1912, 1913, 1915, 1916, 1917, 1918, 1920, 1921, 1923
- Campeonato del Carnaval: 1913

Philippine national football team

- Far Eastern Championship Games:
  - (Gold medal) 1913
  - (Silver medal) 1915, 1917, 1919, 1921, 1923, 1925
