= China–Japan football rivalry =

Football Rivalry between China and Japan

- Location: Asia (AFC); East Asia (EAFF)
- Teams: China; Japan
- First meeting: 9 May 1917; Far East Asian Games; Japan 0–5 China
- Latest meeting: 12 July 2025; 2025 EAFF E-1 Football Championship; Japan 2–0 China

Statistics
- Total meetings: 44
- Most wins: Japan (20)
- All-time series: China: 15; Draw: 9 Japan: 20
- Largest victory: Japan 7–0 China; 2026 FIFA World Cup qualification (5 September 2024)

The China–Japan football rivalry is a competitive sports rivalry that exists between the national football teams of the two countries, as well as their respective sets of fans. Historical tensions had stemmed this rivalry into one of the most heated rivalries in Asia and the world.

== Men's matches ==
The men's football teams of China (then called the Republic of China) and Japan first met each other in 1917 at the Far Eastern Championship Games, which Japan hosted.

Prior to the 1990s, China was one of Asia's dominant men's football teams, while football in Japan was still limited to amateur levels, partly due to little interest in development for the sport. Thus, China dominated Japan with 13 wins, 3 draws, and 4 losses. However, Japan's establishment of professional football in the 1990s helped turn the tide. Nowadays, Japan has become far more successful than China in men's football with 16 wins, 6 draws, and just 2 losses. Additionally, China has not beaten Japan since March 1998, and Japan won four AFC Asian Cups and have played in every FIFA World Cup since 1998, while China are runners-up in two Asian Cups (one on home soil) and qualified for just one World Cup in 2002, which Japan co-hosted along with South Korea.

#	Date	Venue	Competition	Home team	Score	Away team	Goals (home)	Goals (away)
1	9 May 1917	Shibaura Ground, Tokyo	Far Eastern Championship Games	Japan	0–5	China		Fung Kin Wai 3', 22' (?), Kwok Po Kan 28', Tong Fuk Cheung 30'
2	1 June 1921	Shanghai	Far Eastern Championship Games	China	4–1	Japan		
3	24 May 1923	Osaka	Far Eastern Championship Games	Japan	1–5	China		
4	20 May 1925	Rizal Memorial Stadium, Manila	Far Eastern Championship Games	Japan	0–2	China		Lee Wai Tong (-)
5	27 August 1927	Zhonghua Stadium, Shanghai	Far Eastern Championship Games	China	5–1	Japan	Suen Kam Shun 19', 30', Kai Bingfen 21' (-), 73'	Misao Tamai 41'
6	30 May 1930	Meiji Jingu Gaien Stadium, Tokyo	Far Eastern Championship Games	Japan	3–3	China	Shiro Teshima 23', Tadao Takayama 57', Hideo Shinojima 73'	Suen Kam Shun 40', Chan Kwong Yiu 60', Dai Linjing 70'
7	20 May 1934	Rizal Memorial Stadium, Manila	Far Eastern Championship Games	China	4–3	Japan	Tam Kong Pak 6', 11', Lee Wai Tong 65', 76' (pen.)	Akira Nozawa 60', 72', Takeshi Natori 74'
8	1 May 1966	Unknown	Friendly	Japan	1–2	China		
9	23 June 1975	Government Stadium, Hong Kong	1976 AFC Asian Cup qualification	China	2–1	Japan	Li Yutie 6', Ke Wushang 20'	Kozo Arai 43'
10	11 June 1980	Tianhe Stadium, Guangzhou	Friendly	China	1–0	Japan	Li Xiangfu 67'	
11	26 December 1980	Hong Kong Stadium, Hong Kong	1982 FIFA World Cup qualification	China	1–0	Japan	Rong Zhihang 7'	
12	2 June 1981	Omiya Football Stadium, Saitama	Friendly	Japan	0–0	China		
13	30 September 1981	Singapore	Lion City Cup	Japan	2–0	China		
14	31 January 1983	Kochi	Nehru Cup	China	5–0	Japan		
15	31 May 1984	Omiya Football Stadium, Saitama	Kirin Cup	Japan	1–0	China	Hisashi Kato 84' (pen.)	
16	27 July 1986	Merdeka Stadium, Kuala Lumpur	Merdeka Cup	Japan	4–2	China	Hisashi Kaneko 8', 55', Hiromi Hara 75', Satoshi Tezuka 76'	Li Zheng 44', Wang Yong 77'
17	2 June 1988	Mizuho Stadium, Nagoya	Kirin Cup	Japan	0–3	China		Wang Baoshan 24', Gao Sheng 41', Ma Lin 45'
18	10 May 1990	Nishigaoka Stadium, Tokyo	Friendly	Japan	2–2	China	Tomoyuki Kajino 17', Osamu Maeda 56'	14' (o.g.), Zhang Shaowen 63'
19	13 May 1990	Okayama Stadium, Okayama	Friendly	Japan	2–0	China	Osamu Maeda 26', Mitsunori Yoshida 40'	
20	29 July 1990	Workers' Stadium, Beijing	Dynasty Cup	China	1–0	Japan	Wu Qunli 77'	
21	24 August 1992	Workers' Stadium, Beijing	Dynasty Cup	China	0–2	Japan		Masahiro Fukuda 38', Takuya Takagi 82'
22	6 November 1992	Hiroshima Stadium, Hiroshima	AFC Asian Cup	Japan	3–2	China	Masahiro Fukuda 48', Tsuyoshi Kitazawa 57', Masashi Nakayama 84'	Xie Yuxin 1', Li Xiao 70'
23	18 May 1993	Shanghai	East Asian Games	China	3–2	Japan		
24	23 February 1995	Mong Kok Stadium, Hong Kong	Dynasty Cup	Japan	2–1	China	Toshiya Fujita 16', Hisashi Kurosaki 22'	Gao Feng 55'
25	12 December 1996	Tahnoun bin Mohamed Stadium, Al Ain	AFC Asian Cup	Japan	1–0	China	Naoki Soma 90'	
26	7 March 1998	National Stadium, Tokyo	Dynasty Cup	Japan	0–2	China		Li Bing 9', 50'
27	15 March 2000	Universiade Memorial Stadium, Kobe	Friendly	Japan	0–0	China		
28	26 October 2000	Camille Chamoun Sports City Stadium, Beirut	AFC Asian Cup	China	2–3	Japan	Qi Hong 30', Yang Chen 48'	Fan Zhiyi 21' (o.g.), Akinori Nishizawa 53', Tomokazu Myojin 61'
29	8 October 2002	Masan Stadium, Changwon	Asian Games	China	0–1	Japan		Satoshi Nakayama 60'
30	4 December 2003	National Stadium, Tokyo	EAFF Championship	Japan	2–0	China	Tatsuhiko Kubo 4', 80'	
31	7 August 2004	Workers' Stadium, Beijing	AFC Asian Cup	China	1–3	Japan	Li Ming 31'	Takashi Fukunishi 22', Koji Nakata 65', Keiji Tamada 90+1'
32	3 August 2005	Daejeon World Cup Stadium, Daejeon	EAFF Championship	Japan	2–2	China	Teruyuki Moniwa 59', Tatsuya Tanaka 87'	Li Jinyu 37', Zhang Yonghai 43'
33	20 February 2008	Chongqing Olympic Sports Center, Chongqing	EAFF Championship	China	0–1	Japan		Koji Yamase 17'
34	6 February 2010	Tokyo Stadium, Tokyo	EAFF Championship	Japan	0–0	China		
35	21 July 2013	Seoul World Cup Stadium, Seoul	EAFF Championship	Japan	3–3	China	Yuzo Kurihara 32', Yoichiro Kakitani 59', Masato Kudo 60'	Wang Yongpo 4' (pen.), 80' (pen.), Sun Ke 86'
36	9 August 2015	Wuhan Sports Center Stadium, Wuhan	EAFF Championship	China	1–1	Japan	Wu Lei 10'	Yuki Muto 41'
37	12 December 2017	Ajinomoto Stadium, Chōfu	EAFF Championship	Japan	2–1	China	Yu Kobayashi 84', Gen Shōji 88'	Yu Dabao 90+3'
38	10 December 2019	Busan Gudeok Stadium, Busan	EAFF Championship	China	1–2	Japan	Dong Xuesheng 90'	Musashi Suzuki 29', Genta Miura 70'
39	7 September 2021	Khalifa International Stadium, Doha (Qatar)	2022 FIFA World Cup qualification	China	0–1	Japan		Yuya Osako 40'
40	27 January 2022	Saitama Stadium 2002, Saitama	2022 FIFA World Cup qualification	Japan	2–0	China	Yuya Osako 13' (pen.), Junya Ito 61'	
41	24 July 2022	Toyota Stadium, Toyota	EAFF Championship	Japan	0–0	China		
42	5 September 2024	Saitama Stadium, Saitama	2026 FIFA World Cup qualification	Japan	7–0	China	Wataru Endo 12', Kaoru Mitoma 45+2', Takumi Minamino 52', 58', Junya Ito 77', Daizen Maeda 87', Takefusa Kubo 90+5'	
43	19 November 2024	Xiamen Egret Stadium, Xiamen	2026 FIFA World Cup qualification	China	1–3	Japan	Lin Liangming 48'	Koki Ogawa 39', 54', Ko Itakura 45+5'
44	12 July 2025	Yongin Mireu Stadium, Yongin	EAFF Championship	Japan	2–0	China	Mao Hosoya 11', Henry Heroki Mochizuki 63'	

=== Head-to-head record ===
As of 12 July 2025

Competition	China wins	Draws	Japan wins
Total	15	9	20

== Women's matches ==
#	Date	Venue	Competition	Home team	Score	Away team	Goals (home)	Goals (away)
1	31 August 2018	Gelora Sriwijaya, Palembang	2018 Asian Games	Japan	1–0	China	Yuika Sugasawa 90'	
2	14 December 2019	Busan Gudeok Stadium, Busan	2019 EAFF E-1 Football Championship	China	0–3	Japan		Mana Iwabuchi 9', 44', 56'
3	4 February 2022	Shree Shiv Chhatrapati Sports Complex, Pune	2022 Women's Asian Cup	China	2–2 (a.e.t.) (4–3 p)	Japan	Wu Chengshu 46', Wang Shanshan 119'	Riko Ueki 26', 103'
4	26 July 2022	Kashima Soccer Stadium, Kashima	2022 EAFF E-1 Football Championship	Japan	0–0	China		

=== Head-to-head record ===
As of 26 July 2022

Competition	China wins	Draws	Japan wins
Total	0	2	2

== See also ==
- China–Japan relations
