= Football at the Far Eastern Championship Games =

Far Eastern Championship Games
- Founded: 1913
- Abolished: 1934
- Region: Asia
- Teams: 2 to 4 teams
- Last champions: (Republic of China (1912–1949)) China
- Most championships: (Republic of China (1912–1949)) China (9)

Football at Far Eastern Championship Games was the only major international football competition in Asia pre-World War II. It was contested by China, Japan and the Philippines, with the Dutch East Indies joining the last edition of the tournament in 1934.

Although the Philippines won the first tournament, China achieved nine consecutive victories from the second tournament to the tenth tournament. In the 9th tournament, Japan and China lined up side by side, but due to discussions between the two sides, it was decided that no rematch would be held, and both teams were treated as winners.

== Results ==
Year	Host	Winners	Runners-up	Third Place (If any)	Top scorer(s)	
1913; Details	(Philippines); Manila	Philippines	China		Not known	
1915; Details	(Republic of China (1912–1949)); Shanghai	China	Philippines		(Republic of China (1912–1949)) Kwok Po Kan	1 goal
1917; Details	(Empire of Japan); Tokyo	China	Philippines	Japan	(Republic of China (1912–1949)) Tong Fuk Cheung (Republic of China (1912–1949)) Fung Kin Wai	3 goals
1919; Details	(Philippines); Manila	China	Philippines		(Republic of China (1912–1949)) Wong Pak Chung	3 goals
1921; Details	(Republic of China (1912–1949)); Shanghai	China	Philippines	Japan	(Republic of China (1912–1949)) Yip Kao Ko	2 goals
1923; Details	(Empire of Japan); Osaka	China	Philippines	Japan	(Republic of China (1912–1949)) Wong Pak Chung (Republic of China (1912–1949)) Yip Kao Ko	3 goals
1925; Details	(Philippines); Manila	China	Philippines	Japan	(Republic of China (1912–1949)) Lee Wai Tong	5 goals
1927; Details	(Republic of China (1912–1949)); Shanghai	China	Japan	Philippines	(Republic of China (1912–1949)) Suen Kam Shun	4 goals
1930; Details	(Empire of Japan); Tokyo	China; Japan		Philippines	(Japan) Takeo Wakabayashi	4 goals
1934; Details	(Philippines); Manila	China	Dutch East Indies; Japan; Philippines		Five players	3 goals

== Summary ==
Note: All matches played before the founding of the Chinese Football Association in 1924 are not counted as A-level matches by FIFA.

#	Team	Part	M	W	D	L	GF	GA	GD	Points
1	China	10	23	18	3	2	60	17	+43	57
2	Philippines	10	22	7	2	13	41	48	–7	23
3	Japan	7	15	3	1	11	26	65	–39	10
4	Dutch East Indies	1	3	1	0	2	9	6	+3	3

== Medals ==
Rank	Nation	Gold	Silver	Bronze	Total
1	China	9	1	0	10
2	Philippines	1	7	2	10
3	Japan	1	2	4	7
4	Dutch East Indies	0	1	0	1
Totals (4 entries)		11	11	6	28

== All-time top goalscorers ==
Rank	Name	Team	Goals	Tournament(s)
1	(Republic of China (1912–1949)) Lee Wai Tong	China	8	1925(5) and 1934(3)
2	(Republic of China (1912–1949)) Wong Pak Chung	China	7	1919(3), 1921(1) and 1923(3)
3	(Republic of China (1912–1949)) Suen Kam Shun	China	6	1927(4) and 1930(2)
4	(Republic of China (1912–1949)) Tong Fuk Cheung	China	5	1913(1), 1917(3) and 1919(1)
4	(Republic of China (1912–1949)) Yip Kao Ko	China	5	1921(2) and 1923(3)
6	(Japan) Takeo Wakabayashi	Japan	4	1930(4)

== Hat-tricks ==
Far Eastern Championship Games hat-tricks
#	Player	G	Time of goals	For	Result	Against	Tournament	Date	FIFA report
1.	Fung Kin Wai	3	3', 22', ?'	China	5–0	Japan	1917 Far Eastern Games	9 May 1917	[Report]
2.	Yip Kao Ko	3	10', ?', 46'	China	5–1	Japan	1923 Far Eastern Games	24 May 1923	[Report]
3.	Lee Wai Tong	3	10', 25', 61'	China	5–1	Philippines	1925 Far Eastern Games	22 May 1925	[Report]
4.	Cai Bingfen	3	21', ?', 73'	China	5–1	Japan	1927 Far Eastern Games	27 August 1927	[Report]
5.	Takeo Wakabayashi	4	10', 12', 22', 51'	Japan	7–2	Philippines	1930 Far Eastern Games	25 May 1930	[Report]
6.	Dai Linjing	3	14', 27', 30'	China	5–0	Philippines	1930 Far Eastern Games	27 May 1930	[Report]
7.	Ludwich Jahn	3	16', 50', 65'	Dutch East Indies	7–1	Japan	1934 Far Eastern Games	13 May 1934	[Report]
8.	Tio Hian Goan	3	37', 56', 58'	Dutch East Indies	7–1	Japan	1934 Far Eastern Games	13 May 1934	[Report]
