= Manuel Nieto (born 1892) =

Filipino footballer, businessman, politician and military official (1892–1970)

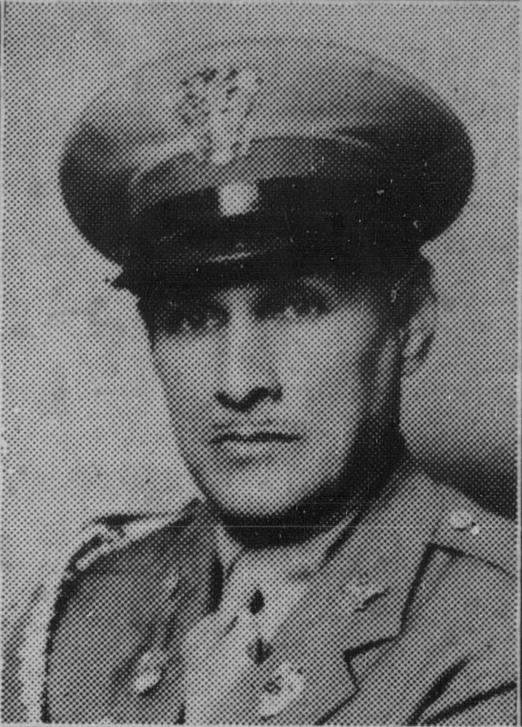
- Born: Manuel Nieto y Martínez; 13 June 1892; Ilagan, Isabela, Captaincy General of the Philippines, Spanish East Indies
- Died: 15 September 1980 (aged 88); Madrid, Spain
- Education: Colegio de San Juan de Letran; Escuela Superior de Comercio de Barcelona; University of Santo Tomas
- Occupations: Footballer; businessman; military officer; politician; diplomat
- Political party: Nacionalista
- Spouse: Angela Garcia Hidalgo
- Children: 4
Association football career
- Position: Defender
Senior career*
Years	Team	Apps	(Gls)
1911–1918 1922–1925 1931	Bohemian		
International career
1913–1917	Philippines		
Medal record
Philippines
Far Eastern Championship Games
Gold medal – first place	1913 Manila	Team
Silver medal – second place	1917 Tokyo	Team
- * Club domestic league appearances and goals

Member of the House of Representatives of the Philippines from Isabela's Lone District
- In office 2 June 1925 – 5 June 1928
- Preceded by: Tolentino Verzoza
- Succeeded by: Pascual Paguirigan

Member of the House of Representatives of the Philippines from Nueva Vizcaya's Lone District
- In office 5 June 1928 – 2 June 1931
- Preceded by: Antonio G. Escamilla
- Succeeded by: Domingo Maddela

Cabinet Secretariat of the Philippines
- In office 19 May 1944 – 1 August 1944
- President: Manuel L. Quezon

Secretary of Agriculture, Trade and Industry
- In office 8 August 1944 – 27 February 1945
- President: Sergio Osmeña
- Preceded by: Rafael Alunan (as Minister of Agriculture and Commerce); Andrés Soriano
- Succeeded by: Delfín Jaranilla

Ambassador of the Philippines to Spain
- In office 23 January 1956 – 1960
- President: Ramon Magsaysay; Carlos P. Garcia
- Preceded by: Pedro Sabido
- Succeeded by: Pedro C. Hernaez
- In office 1977–1980
- President: Ferdinand Marcos
- Preceded by: José Manuel Stilianopoulos
- Succeeded by: Manuel Nieto Jr.

Personal details
- Party: Nacionalista (1925–1945)
- Military career
- Allegiance: Philippine Commonwealth
- Branch: Army of the Philippines
- Service years: 1941–1945
- Rank: Colonel
- Conflicts: World War II; Philippines campaign (1941–1942); Japanese occupation of the Philippines

Manuel Martínez Nieto Sr. (born Manuel Nieto y Martínez; June 13, 1892 – September 15, 1980), also referred to as Manolo Nieto, was a Filipino footballer, businessman, Army of the Philippines officer, politician and diplomat.

An academic and cultured man, his father was owner of the tobacco estate businesses and controller of the monopoly around Northern Luzon, especially in Isabela which Nieto inherited. During his younger days he was a refined athlete as well who competed in track and field but was best known for his football talent. As a football player of the 1910s and 1920s he spent his years at Bohemian SC as a Defender and was widely regarded as the best Filipino full-back of all time in the eyes of the sports journalists, watchers and athletes of that period. He participated also at the two most remembered Far Eastern Championship Games in 1913 and 1917, football-wise, all while he continued his studies and from time to time having to take brakes from the sport. In that stretch of years, in 1916, he met Manuel L. Quezon at the time elected as Resident Commissioner to the United States and, right after his graduation from the Colegio de San Juan de Letran, he offered his services to him. The two became close friends and formed a strong bond between them. So Manolo, as how he was called by his close acquaintances, began his life as a public servant when he was first appointed by Quezon as a secretary of the Senate while also continuing his father business and studies. From there he became member of the House of Representatives of the Philippines and when Quezon became President of the Philippines, Nieto started the Officer's Training Camp in Baguio, where he graduated and was commissioned as the Captain of the Philippine Army in the Reserve Corps. Right after, he was named his aide-de-camp and then his Cabinet Secretariat, roles that he served until President Quezon's death. He continued afterwards to serve the country becoming an ambassador to Spain, a duty he covered two times and the last until he died.

== Early life and education ==
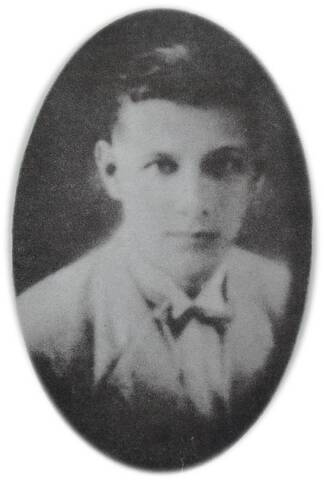
Manuel Nieto during his younger years

Nieto was born in Ilagan, in the province of Isabela, the year of 1892. The son of Spaniard Manuel Nieto y Noriega from Cantabria, Spain and Victoria Cabal Martinez from Isabela. He first took his education at his parental home and then graduated at the Escuela Catolica in Ilagan. When he grew up enough, to enter college, he was sent by his parents to the capital city in Manila to continue his studies and attended the Colegio de San Juan de Letran. He was a very applied and laborious student and his teachers, as well as his schoolmates, were very proud of him. After reaching his final year he obtained his Bachelor of Arts degree and decided to embark on a trip to Spain where he studied at the Escuela Superior de Comercio de Barcelona. Some years later, after receiving his degree in commerce, he returned to the Philippines, this time, at the University of Santo Tomas where he got his Bachelor of Laws. Besides being a knowledgeable individual he had a lot of qualities and a strong personality that helped him throughout his life and be successful in the multiple fields he part-taken while carrying a leading role.

== Football career ==
=== Bohemian Sporting Club ===
"He had been a fine track athlete and perhaps the best football player of his day in the Philippines."

— Manuel L. Quezon when writing about Nieto on his autobiography, The Good Fight (1946).

Manolo played for the historical side of Bohemian Sporting Club and was one of the leaders of the team as well as one of its captains. He was also one of the first players to join the red sashed club and one of the first who lifted the club's first National Championship in 1912. Thanks to his performances he was called up from the Philippine Islands football team and represented them in the first Far Eastern Championship Games in Manila. After coming off of a victory and a gold medal, his club Bohemian, contended for another continental competition, the "Campeonato del Carnaval" and triumphed over South China AA with a 3 to 1 victory. The same year he successfully defended his title and came off as well with a back to back win of the Philippine crown. After a brief loss of the crown due to the victory in the championship by Nomad SC, in 1914, Nieto led the red sashed players from the defense, accompanied by one of the best side assembled, to a historical four-peat run, regaining and winning the Philippine Championship in 1915, 1916, 1917 and 1918. From that another three-peat from his Bohemian team followed in 1920, 1921 and 1922. Nieto established a reputation as one of the most accomplished sportsmen in the Philippines. Nieto also had a "nemesis" in Solano, who played as forward for Aurora Athletic Club and Espartaco. Prior and during start of the decade and on, however, Nieto's presence on the field was characterized by absences due to his studies and then for his work as a politician. He continued to play occasionally, including in a game against rival Aurora in the spring of 1931 that ended in a 1–1 draw.

=== International career ===
Nieto was one of the captains and leaders of Bohemian and was one as well for the Philippine Islands Football Team. His international career was discontinued as a results of his studies, work and later for his life as a secretary of the senate. Regardless of that he was a participant and a member of the National team at the Far Eastern Championship Games in 1913 and 1917. In 1913 in Manila, he was in the line up that faced China and triumphed over them with a 2 to 1 victory and won Philippine's only football gold medal of the tournament. That game was the start of the fierce rivalry between the two sides when the Chinese accused the Filipinos of not being native of their country. After missing out on the 1915 edition he took part at the 1917 Far East Games in Tokyo where he was included in the Filipino team that won its biggest ever win by margin to this day, defeating Japan by 15 goals to 2. The tournament, despite such performance, ended in a silver medal for Nieto and his team. That was his last appearance for the National team and did not take part in the later Far East Games even when they were held in the Philippines. His academic works and later jobs kept him away from international football like in the 1919 edition, won by China, which saw competitive games between the P. I. and China that shared a victory a piece to take it to a third match and Nieto's absence, as he was possibly in Barcelona for studies, was one of the factors that stopped the Philippines getting its second football gold medal.

== Business career ==
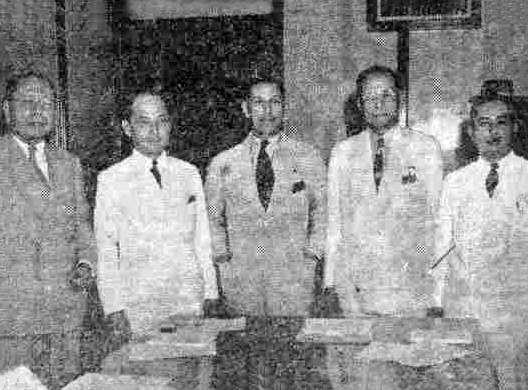
1940, National Tobacco Corporation Directors: Antonio Carag, Benito Razón, Manuel Nieto, Pío Ancheta and Andrés Paredes

His father, Cantabrian, owned tobacco plantations and estates around the provinces of Northern Luzon and Nieto inherited the plantation lands in Isabela. His knowledge in marketing after his studies came to be beneficial as he was able to put it in practice by turning his estates a way of making lucrative profits. He continued to be involved in the tobacco trading and merchandising businesses while countinuig his assignments as Quezon's aide de camp and when in 1940 the National Tobacco Corporation was organized, Nieto became its manager. Before he inaugurated the opening of the company he took an oath of office, the previous day, in the business studio of Benito Razón, manager of the National Trading Corporation.

== Political career ==
His first encounter with Manuel L. Quezon took place in 1916 during Nieto's graduation at the Colegio de San Juan de Letran, also the alma mater of Quezon's, who was present that day after his election as Resident commissioner to the US and after the passage of the Jones Act. It happened in a celebration organized by the Dominican friars and the whole student body, among them also Nieto, while forming a guard of honor in front of the college building. From that moment, Nieto offered his services to Quezon who when he became president of the Senate appointed him as its secretary.

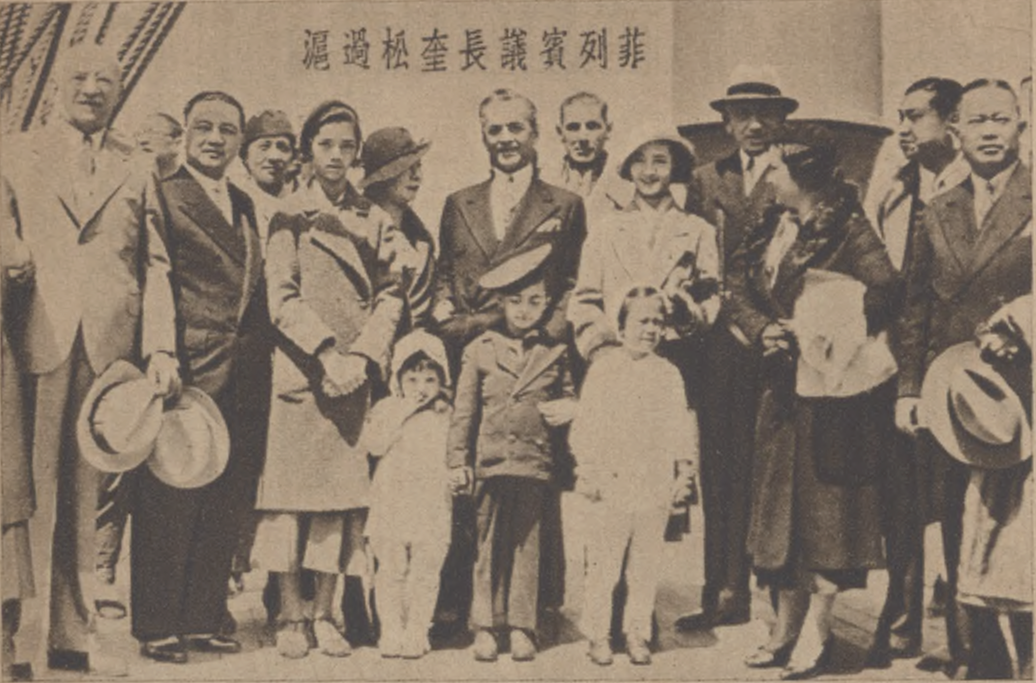
Nieto accompanying Quezon in Shanghai in 1934

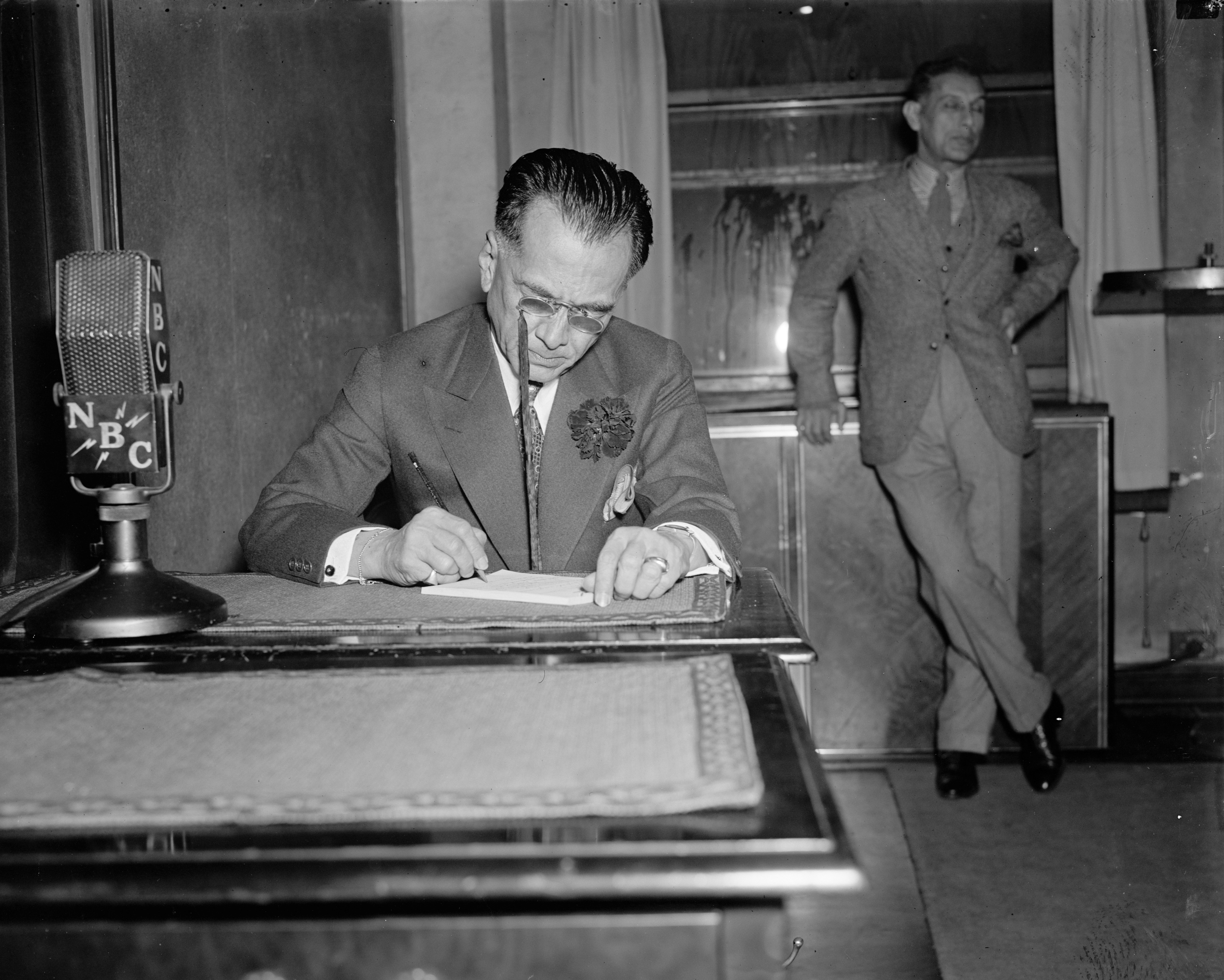
President Manuel Quezon broadcast in 1937 from Washington DC with Nieto

He accompanied him everywhere in his travels, weather it was in the country or outside and was by his side eventually to protect him. In the summer of 1925 he was elected, with 2303 votes, the representative for the lone district from Isabela over nacionalista Pascual Paguirigan with 2055 votes, Cesar A. Flormata, independent with 1538 votes, Rufo Ramos, independent, with 1457 votes, Tomas Gollayam with 1052 votes; Claro Masigan, democrat, with 707 votes, Tolentino Verzosa, of his same political affiliation, with 375 votes and Isidro Guzman nacionalista-consolidado with 57 votes. He was member of the Committees of Agriculture, Navigation, Public works and Safety of the 7th Philippine Legislature. From 1928 to 1931, right after his services, he was appointed representative for the lone district, this time, from Nueva Vizcaya. A few years forward Nieto, then President Quezon's aide de camp and Philippine Army's colonel, was appointed as his Cabinet Secretariat of the Philippines in 1944. Following Quezon's death, Sergio Osmeña, who became president, revamped the Philippine Commonwealth War Cabinet and named Nieto as the secretary of agriculture and Commerce. The 19th day of August 1946 which celebrated the first year of the Philippines' independence was also the day he was selected by President Manuel Roxas in a new ordinance. He was designated in a committee where he and the other officials and notable people were tasked in raising the necessary funds for the erection of a national monument in honor of the late president Manuel L. Quezon.

== Military career ==
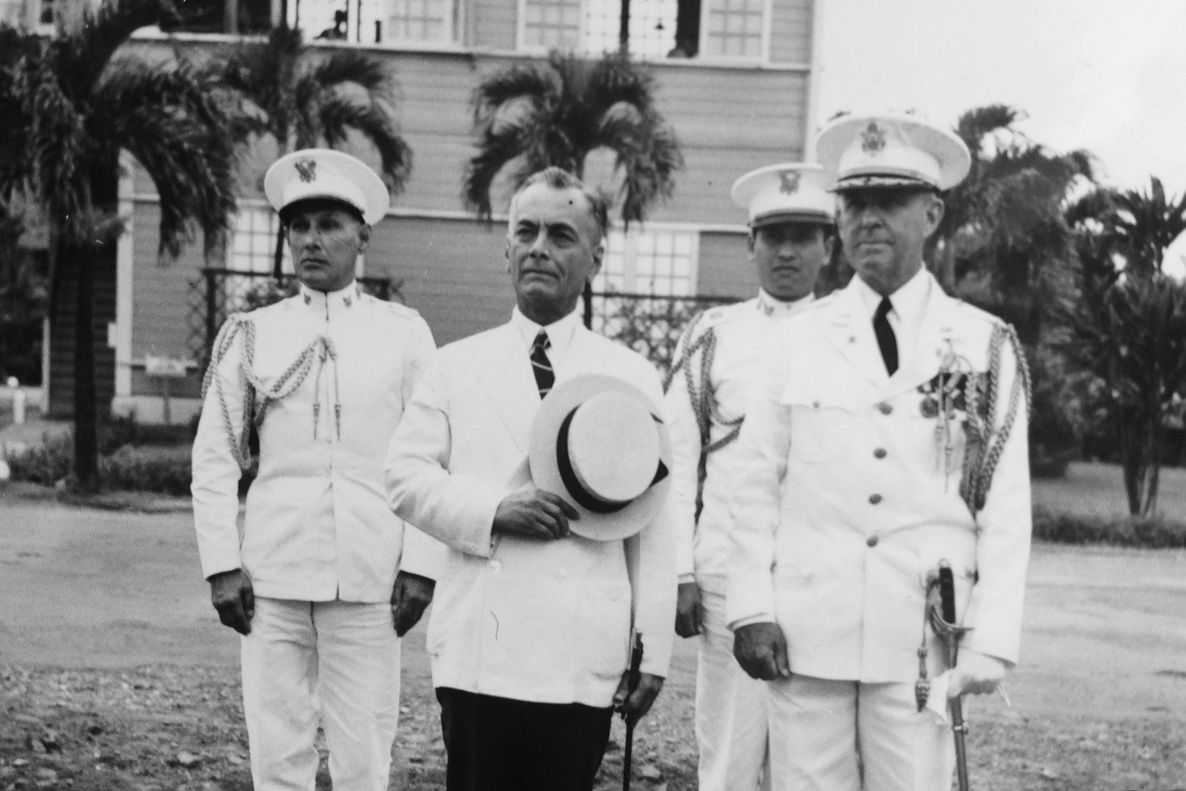
Col. Nieto, President Quezon, Gen. Arsenio Natividad and a high rank from the US

Nieto, Quezon's personal assistant and secretary at the Senate, acted more as a bodyguard towards him and was always by his side whenever he thought he was in danger. He accompanied him everywhere in his travels around the Philippines and outside the country as well. When Quezon became President of the Philippines, he still wanted him around, so Nieto began his military training at the Officer's Training Camp in Baguio, where he graduated with distinction and was commissioned as Captain of the Philippine Army in the Reserve-Infantry. Following his promotion to the rank of colonel he was appointed as Quezon's aide de camp and assisted the President, whose health condition worsened day by day, his family and his War Cabinet when the Japanese invaded the Philippines in December 1941. Colonel Nieto, who accompanied the President and his party to Corregidor, was responsible on going back to Manila, declared that moment an Open city, to take his prescribed medicine and report to Secretary Vargas to send President Quezon as much paper currency as possible. He had to return to the capital again, this time, accompanied by the chief of staff of the Philippine Army and acting secretary of National Defense, General Valdes to visit the Filipino forces in Bataan and report to the President the situation.

"I am deciding it; I am not leaving it to him. I need him. He has been with me in my most critical moments. When I needed someone to accompany my family to the States, I asked him to do it. When I had to be operated I took him with me; now that need him more than ever, I am a sick man. I made him an officer to make him my aide."

— Manuel L. Quezon

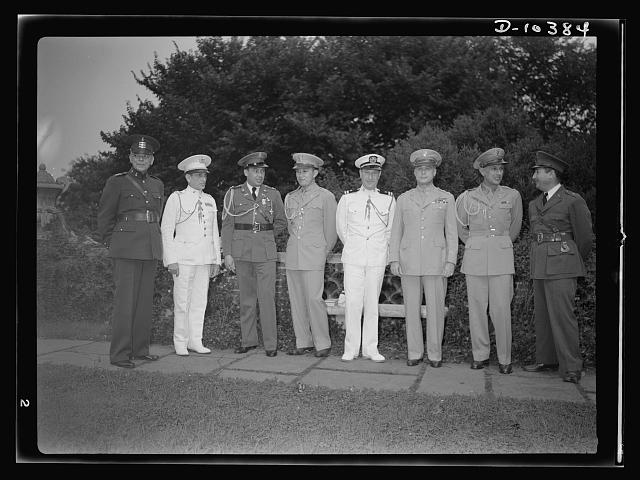
Colonel Nieto among the other Officers of the United Nations

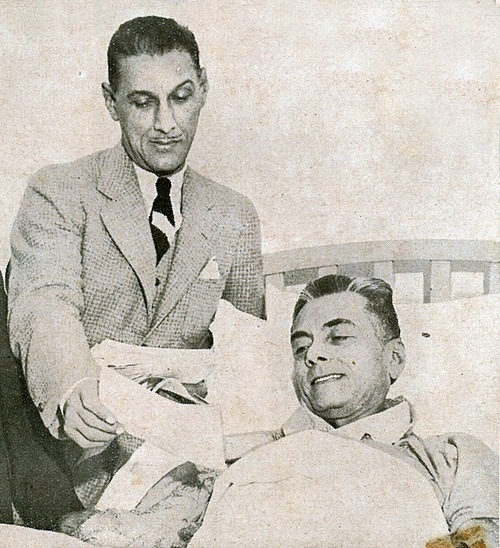
Nieto assisting the President

When President Quezon was urged to go outside of the country to not get captured by the Japanese, Colonel Nieto played a major role and took responsibility in planning particular and correct movements to assure a safe escape. When the Japanese were ready to take over Corregidor and Bataan, Colonel Nieto together with Major General Basilio J. Valdes, Vice President Osmeña, Chief Justice Abad Santos, Father Ortiz and the first family had to move President Quezon in the Southern Islands and jumped aboard in the submarine “Swordfish” by Commander Chester C. Smith of the US Navy. When they resufaced, in Iloilo, they then settled in Negros but had to be on the run again when the enemy's ships were spotted on the island's waters and later when Philippine's vessel "Princess of Negros" was captured by the Japanese. From there Colonel Nieto along with the other officers had to think of how to get away from Negros without alerting the enemy forces. General MacArthur, who would've been with them, communicated to the rest that two PT boats would've waited for them in Dumaguete and be ready to take them away the next days. With the waters still occupied by the Japanese, they decided to risk it and embarked on the motor torpedo boats with Lieutenant John D. Bulkeley in the middle of the night of March 26 and 27 and arrived from Dumaguete to Oroquieta in Misamis. Afterwards they flew with two military planes from Mindanao to Australia. After this difficult mission he was awarded, by order of General MacArthur, with the Silver Star Medal and with the Distinguished Service Star of the Philippines by order of President Quezon. Colonel Nieto arranged with details the movements of the president's family and Cabinet members, executing perfectly his plan and insured the accomplishment of a difficult and dangeorous journey while assuming major responsibility in transporting President Quezon and taking him to safety from the Philippines to Melbourne, Australia and was applauded for demonstrating marked skill and coolness in the face of a greatly superior enemy force. They had to move to the United States when it was decided that the Cabinet had to be moved there and be reorganized. Colonel Nieto was appointed his Cabinet Secretariat and continued to aid President Quezon while accompanying him from different States until his health condition deteriored and died on August 1, 1944.

== Diplomatic career ==
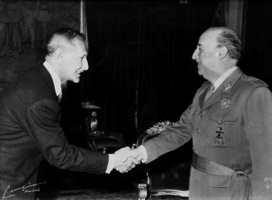
Ambassador Nieto Sr. greeting General Francisco Franco in Madrid

Nieto's services to the Nation continued when he was nominated on the 23rd of January in 1956 by President Ramon Magsaysay, succeeded by Carlos P. Garcia, as the ambassador of the Philippines to Spain as well as the Minister Plenipotentiary and ended his first tenure in this role in 1960.

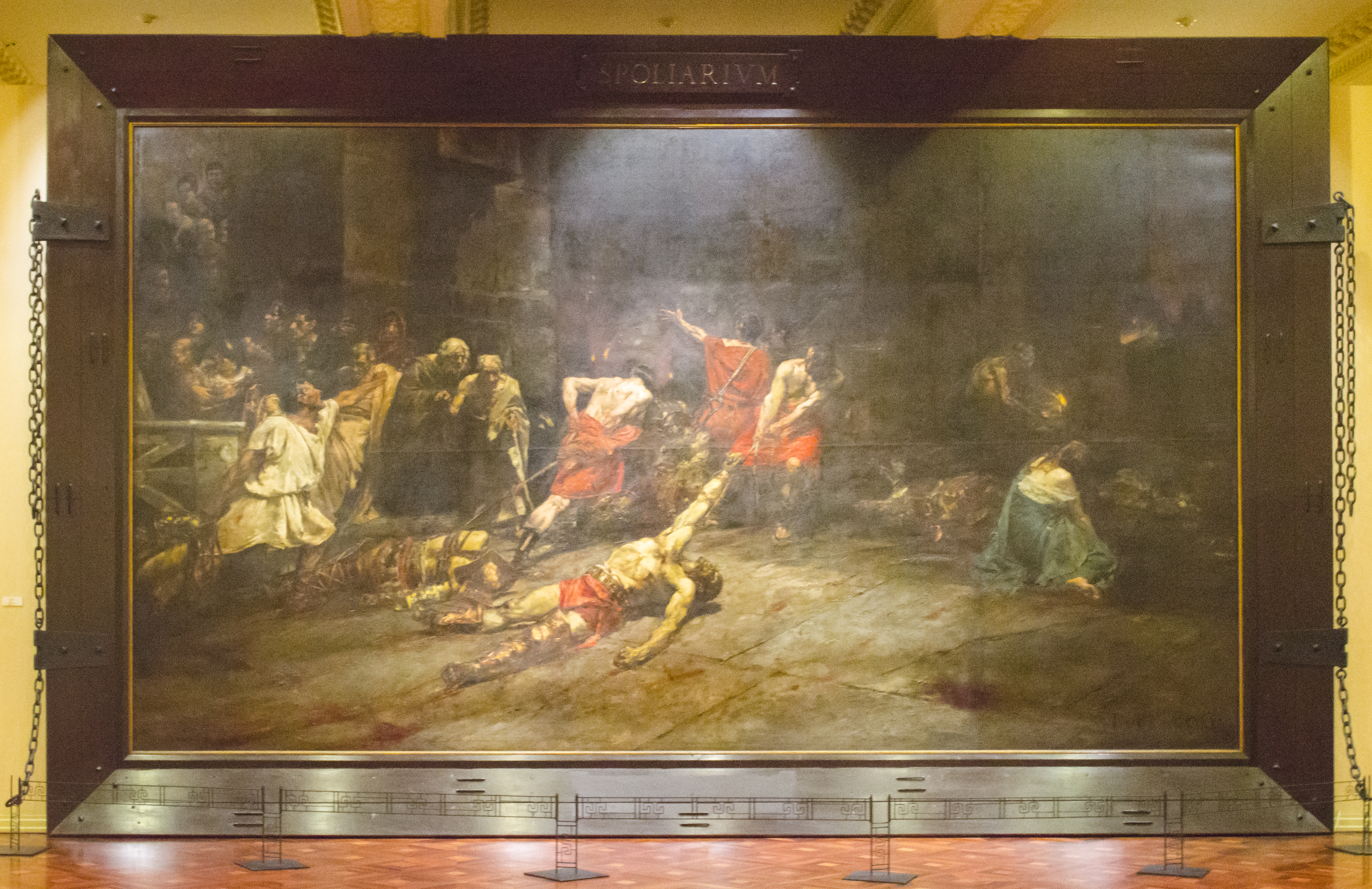
the Spoliarium displayed in the National Museum of the Philippines.

Ambassador Nieto was one of the contributors who worked on bringing back to the Philippines the Spoliarium, Juan Luna's painting from 1884. It was bought and then storaged at the Museo del Arte Moderno in Barcelona in 1887 until the museum was burned and looted during the Spanish Civil War in 1937. The damaged Spoliarium was then transferred in Madrid for restoration where it stayed for 18 years. The calls for the painting's transfer to Manila by the Filipinos and the sympathetic Spaniards in the 1950s led General Francisco Franco to order its complete restoration and donate it to the Philippines. After the restoration was done in late 1957, the painting was turned over to Ambassador Nieto in January 1958 and later sent to the Philippines as a gift from the government of Spain. It was in 1977 when President Ferdinand Marcos appointed him again as an ambassador and he served again in this role until he died in 1980. His successor was his son Manuel Nieto Jr who continued his duty until 1986.

== Personal life ==
Born to a wealthy family, he was the youngest of the two sons of Manuel Nieto y Noriega, a Cantabrian businessman who owned multiple tobacco estates around the provinces of Northern Luzon and Victoria Cabal Martínez, a Filipina born in Isabela. His brother was Lope Martínez Nieto, who was also a prominent business executive and was a Masonic lodge officer at the Isabela Grand Lodge n.60. Manuel Nieto married Angela Garcia Hidalgo with whom he had a family with four children. They were Manuel Hidalgo Nieto Jr., Rene Hidalgo Nieto, Antonio Hidalgo Nieto and Lourdes Aurora Hidalgo Nieto. His two sons Manuel and Rene were prominent sportsmen as well with the first who continued his father's work as an ambassador of the country, became a chairman of the Games and Amusements Board and was a politician as well, serving his duty as an ally of Marcos. On the other end Rene, like his father, played as a defender and participated at the 1954 Asian Games in Manila while representing the Philippines national football team.

== Honors and awards ==
=== Football ===
Bohemian S.C.

- United States Philippines Championship (7): 1912, 1913, 1915, 1916, 1917, 1918, 1922
- Campeonato del Carnaval: 1913

Philippine national football team

- Far Eastern Championship Games:
  - (Gold medal) 1913
  - (Silver medal) 1917

=== Armed forces ===
National

- Distinguished Service Star

Foreign

- Silver Star Medal
