= Zou Wenzhi =

Chinese footballer (born 1914)

Personal information
- Date of birth: 1914
- Place of birth: Hong Kong

Senior career*
Years	Team	Apps	(Gls)
1935–?	South China B		
- Chinese Athletic Association
- Kau Wah FC
- Eastern FC
- Kowloon Motor Bus Company
- Kit Chee

International career
1948–1954	China	+0	(0)
1956–1957	Hong Kong	+1	(+1)
Medal record
Men's football
Representing Taiwan
Asian Games
Gold medal – first place	1954 Manila
- * Club domestic league appearances and goals

Zou Wenzhi (born 1914, date of death unknown) was a Chinese footballer who competed in the men's tournament at the 1948 Summer Olympics. He was very popular in the late 1940s, being regarded by many as the natural successor of Lee Wai Tong.

== Career ==
Born in 1914, Zou made his debut in the Hong Kong First Division in 1935, as a member of South China's B team. He went on to play for the likes of the Chinese Athletic Association, Kau Wah FC, Eastern FC, Kowloon Motor Bus Company, and Kit Chee until he retired in 1961, aged 46–47.

Zou was a member of the Republic of China national team that participated in the football tournament of the 1948 Olympic Games and which won the gold medal in the football tournament of the 1954 Asian Games, to which the 40-year-old Zou contributed with only one appearance in the group stage, a 4–0 win over the Philippines. (Note: The source spells his name as "Chou Wan Chi".) On 31 August 1957, he scored for Hong Kong in a 6–2 win over Cambodia, becoming, at the age of 42-43, the oldest international goalscorer in world football, overtaking England's Stanley Matthews, who had just set the record the previous year, in 1956, aged 41.

Despite being short and having weak shooting power, Zou played bravely and possessed good technique with both feet, being thus capable of playing left or right inside forward, and even as a center back. He sometimes focused too much on personal performance, so the national coach Li used him more as a wingback, which naturally reduced his fancy moves.

He was also very active in martial arts.

== Honours ==
Republic of China

- Asian Games: Gold medal, 1954
