= Paulino Alcántara =

Association footballer (1896–1964)

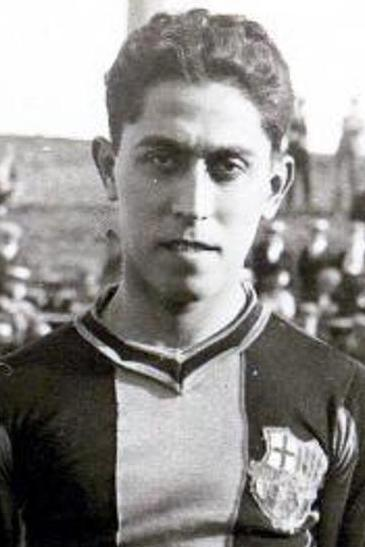
- Alcántara at Barcelona in the 1920s

Personal information
- Full name: Paulino Alcántara Riestrá
- Date of birth: 7 October 1896
- Place of birth: Concepcion, Iloilo, Captaincy General of the Philippines
- Date of death: 13 February 1964 (aged 67)
- Place of death: Barcelona, Spain
- Height: 1.70 m (5 ft 7 in)
- Position: Striker

Youth career
- FC Galeno
- Barcelona

Senior career*
Years	Team	Apps	(Gls)
1912–1916	Barcelona	128	(133)
1916–1918	Bohemian	23	(24)
1918–1927	Barcelona	276	(274)
Total		427	(431)

International career
1915–1926	Catalonia	7	(8)
1917	Philippines	11	(14)
1921–1923	Spain	14	(19)

Managerial career
- 1951: Spain
- 1953: Catalonia
Medal record
Philippines
Far Eastern Championship Games
Silver medal – second place	1917 Tokyo	Team
- * Club domestic league appearances and goals

Paulino Alcántara Riestrá (7 October 1896 – 13 February 1964) was a Spanish and Filipino professional footballer and manager who played as a forward. Born in the Philippines, he played for Catalonia, Philippines and Spain national teams.

Alcántara made his debut for Barcelona at the age of 15, and remains the youngest player to play or score for the club. He scored 395 goals in 399 matches, a club record that stood for 87 years. He also won a total of 19 trophies including 10 Spanish Catalan League, 5 Copa del Rey, 2 Pyrenees Cup and 2 Philippine League championship titles during his 15 year career.

After retiring as a player in 1927 at the age of 31, he became a doctor and served as club director of Barcelona between 1931 and 1934. He also entered politics becoming a member of a conservative fascist political group and participated in the Spanish Civil War in 1936 as a soldier in the Spanish Army. In 1951, he became a coach and managed Spain for three games, and he also became the President of the FC Barcelona Player Association in 1959.

In 2007, Alcántara was officially recognized by FIFA as one of the greatest football strikers in the 20th century and in the history of football, and the best Asian male footballer of all time.

== Club career ==
=== Early years ===
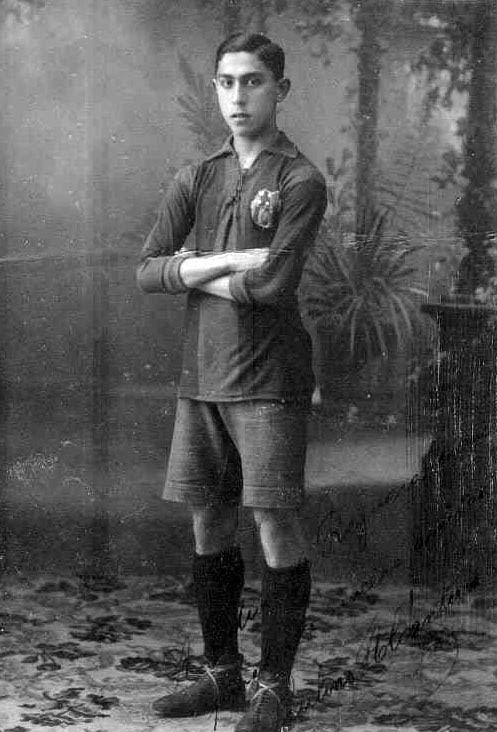
Alcántara during his first years with FC Barcelona

Alcántara was born and raised in Concepcion, Iloilo, in the Spanish colony of the Philippines in 1896. He was the son of Don Eduardo de Alcántara y Garchitorena, a Filipino born criollo Spaniard from Manila, and Doña Victoriana Riestrá, a Filipina mestiza of mixed Spanish origin from Iloilo.

He was raised there until he was three years old when his family moved to Barcelona fleeing from the conflicts of the Philippine Revolution's war of independence from Spain, the same year that FC Barcelona was formed by Joan Gamper.

In Spain, Alcántara started playing for FC Galeno, a Barcelona-based club that was founded by and largely made up of medical students and young doctors with their games played in the courtyard of a local hospital. He immediately impressed and in February 1912 he was scouted by Barcelona's president Joan Gamper who attended a Galeno match. Alcántara then joined Barcelona's youth team and within the same week, he made his first-team debut at the age of 15 years, 4 months and 18 days on 25 February 1912 against Catalá SC (founded only weeks before FC Barcelona) in the Campionat de Catalunya (Catalan football championship) at the Camp de la Indústria, in front of about 100 fans. Barcelona won that game 9–0, with Alcántara scoring the first three goals of the game, setting the still unbroken record for being the youngest player to ever play and score for FC Barcelona in an official match. He was also the youngest hat-trick scorer in the world at the time, a record that stood for 84 years. Among his teammates during his time at the club were Francisco Bru Sanz, Jack Greenwell, Romà Forns and club captain, also fellow countryman, Manuel Amechazurra. He went on to help the club win two Campionat de Catalunya in 1913 and 1916 and the 1913 Copa del Rey (Spanish Cup), in which he missed the final that ended in a 2–2 draw with Real Sociedad, but then played in the replay as Barcelona came-out as 2-1 winners.

=== Bohemian Sporting Club ===
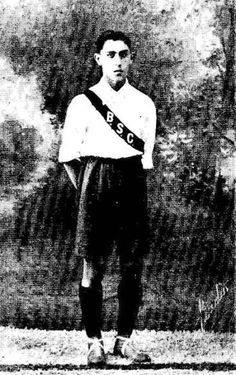
Alcántara at Bohemian Sporting Club in 1917

In 1916, Alcántara's parents returned to the Philippines during a time when it was under the territorial control of the United States, took their sons and daughters with them. There Alcántara continued his studies in medicine and played football for the country's reigning champions Bohemian Sporting Club. He helped the club win two more Philippine Championships in 1917 and 1918 after the team was coming off of two title defenses. He was selected by the United States Philippine national football team in 1917 and represented his country at the Far Eastern Championship Games in Tokyo, helping them defeat Japan and getting in the scoresheet of the 15–2 victory, which is still the Philippines' biggest win in international football. Besides being a footballer, he was also a talented table tennis player and represented the Philippines on that sport as well. Meanwhile, Barcelona had failed to win a major trophy in his absence and the club pleaded in vain with his parents to allow him to return to Spain. However, he contracted malaria while in Manila in 1917 and apparently refused to take the prescribed medication in what was still an underdeveloped country. Thanks to his persistence of not getting cured there he was allowed to go back and took his medication in Spain.

=== FC Barcelona ===
After returning to Barcelona, his former teammate and manager Jack Greenwell experimented by playing Alcántara as a defender, but Alcántara did not succeed in that position. The paying members of Barça's club membership, "Els Socis," demanded that Alcántara be switched back to his normal position, which saw him return to the forward line. In 1919, he helped the club win another Campionat de Catalunya. The club also reached the 1919 Copa del Rey Final but lost 2–5 to Arenas Club de Getxo, courtesy of a hat-trick from future teammate Félix Sesúmaga. On 13 April 1919 in a game at Les Corts against Real Sociedad, Alcántara scored the "police goal," when a policeman got in the way of a powerful shot, so both the ball and policeman ended up in the back of the net. In 1920 the club won another Copa del Rey and the Campionat de Catalunya, with Alcántara scoring in the 2–0 win over Athletic Bilbao in the Cup final. The squad included Emilio Sagi Liñán, who formed a partnership with Alcántara as well as Ricardo Zamora, Josep Samitier and Félix Sesúmaga. This marked the beginning of the club's first golden era and saw them dominate both the Campionat de Catalunya and the Copa del Rey. Alcántara scored twice in the 1922 Cup final, where Barcelona defeated Real Unión 5–1 and scored the winning goal in the 3–2 win over Atlético Madrid in the 1926 final.

=== International career ===
Like many other FC Barcelona players at that time, Alcántara was summoned to play for the Catalonian national team several times, making his debut on 3 January 1915 against the “North team” (a Basque Country XI). In May 1915, he was a member of the Catalan side that participated in the first edition of the Prince of Asturias Cup, an inter-regional competition organized by the RFEF. He scored the first-ever goal of the competition in the opening game against the Centro team (a Castile/Madrid XI), which ended in a 2–1 win, but a loss to North in the following game prevented them from winning the tournament. Alcántara also represented Catalonia in the last edition of the Prince of Asturias Cup in 1926, which was a two-legged tie between the previous two champions, Catalonia and Asturias, for the right to keep the trophy, and Alcántara netted in the second leg in a 4–3 win, thus contributing decisively in helping Catalonia to win a record-breaking third Prince of Asturias Cup title.

In 1917 he was selected by the U.S. Philippines national team and represented the country at the Far Eastern Championship Games in Tokyo, helping them defeat Japan 15–2, which became the Philippines' biggest win in international football.

In 1920 Alcántara, along with Zamora, Samitier and Sesúmaga, was selected to represent Spain at the 1920 Summer Olympics. However, Alcántara chose to stay at home to take his final medical exams. Without him, Spain was eliminated in the quarter-finals by the eventual champions Belgium, the same team against which he eventually made his debut on 7 October 1921, aged 25, scoring both goals in a 2–0 win. In 1922, he was nicknamed "El Rompe Redes" or "Trencaxarxes" (the net breaker) after he broke the goal's net with a shot during a match against France. In total, he made five appearances and scored a then-national record of six goals for Spain between 1921 and 1927.

=== Retirement ===
Alcántara retired on 3 July 1927 in order to become a doctor at age 31, the same day that FC Barcelona played against Spain in a testimonial match in his honour. He later served as a club director between 1931 and 1934. Alcántara was one of the first footballers to write memoirs of his playing days. In 1951, Alcántara was one of three selectors, along with Félix Quesada and Luís Iceta, that coached Spain for three games against Switzerland, Belgium and Sweden. He won one game and tied the other two.

=== Club management ===
Alcántara was club director from 1931 to 1934 and was president of FC Barcelona Players Association in 1959.

== Career outside of football ==
=== Medicine ===
In 1916, Alcántara, along with his family returned to the Philippines, traveling by ocean liner, to settle back in their homeland. While there, he studied medicine and played professional football in the Philippine Domestic League, but the situation with FC Barcelona meant that in 1918, he returned to Spain to play for the club due to the high demands of his footballing services. Most of his family members stayed in the Philippines, while he travelled back to Spain to continue with his football career. From the mid-1920s he combined his professional football career with the practice of becoming a doctor.

=== Politics ===
In the 1930s, Alcántara entered politics and was a member of the Falange Española, the variant of Spanish Fascism. On 4 August 1936, he became a soldier and fled to Andorra and France after Franco's coup failed to take the city of Barcelona on 18 July 1936. In 1936 Alcántara was a Carlist volunteer and participated in numerous military operations of the nationalist troops of Francisco Franco. During the Spanish Civil War, Alcántara was Lieutenant of the first battalion of the Brigade Legionary Black Arrows (Frecce Nere). The Black Arrows was a volunteer corps (Corpo Truppe Volontarie) directed directly by Benito Mussolini. With the Black Arrows, Alcántara served on the fronts of Guadalajara, Aragon and Catalonia. With General Yagüe, he entered the city of Barcelona victoriously on 26 January 1939.

After the Spanish Civil War, Alcántara lived in Barcelona and was Lieutenant of the Black Arrows. During the Spanish State and World War II period, Alcántara was a Chief of the Falange Española Tradicionalista y de las JONS.

== Personal life ==
Alcántara was married to Blanca López, a Spaniard from Barcelona, with whom he had two sons, the eldest being Eduardo Alcántara López.

Alcántara was the son of Don Eduardo de Alcántara y Garchitorena, a criollo Filipino or island-born Spanish from Manila who served as a soldier in the Spanish Army, and Doña Victoriana Riestrá y Cauilán, a criollo Filipino or island-born Spanish from Lal-lo, Cagayan. Alcántara was one of seven children born to a large Spanish Filipino family, and he had three brothers and three sisters. His siblings were Fernándo, Eduardo, Diego María Tomás Ramón José Ceferino, María Victoria, Maria de la Paz, and Josefa, whom were all born and raised in the Philippines.

Alcántara maintained his Spanish nationality throughout his life, and he was also a sovereign Philippine citizen.

=== Final years ===
Alcántara fell ill of a rare condition of aplastic anaemia and died in 1964 at the age of 67 in Barcelona and is laid to rest in Cementiri de les Corts in Barcelona, Catalonia, next to Camp Nou football Stadium in Spain.

== Legacy ==
Alcántara, an iconic figure in world football, is known for his achievements with FC Barcelona, winning a record of 10 Spanish League: Catalan Football Championship titles, 5 Copa del Rey and 2 Pyrenees Cup between the 1910s and the 1920s, and scoring 395 goals in 399 matches; a club record which was broken by Argentine footballer Lionel Messi about a century later in 2014. He is regarded by FIFA as one of the greatest football strikers in the history of football, and the best Asian footballer of all-time. Alcántara is also regarded by Barcelona as one of its great legends, being immortalized at the club's Hall of Fame museum at Barcelona. He was also a popular political figure in Spain during the 1930s. However, even with football being the most popular sport in the world, Alcántara had limited recognition back in his native country, the Philippines, until the 2010s, partially caused by a surge of popularity amongst a new generation of football fans and interest in football in the Philippines.

In 2018, the domestic cup tournament of the Philippines Football League, the Copa Paulino Alcántara was named in his honor. He was also named part of the Philippine Sports Hall of Fame in 2021.

Alcántara was one of several Filipino footballers to have played in the Spanish League, including Eduardo Teus from Real Madrid, Juan Torena, Gregorio Querejeta from Real Zaragoza and Atlético Madrid, Ignacio Larrauri, Julio Uriate, Manuel Amechazurra from FC Barcelona, Felipe Calderon, Marcelino Gálatas from Real Sociedad, José María Echengoyen and José Luís Querejeta.

== Career statistics ==
=== Club ===
Appearances and goals by club, season and competition
Club	Season	Copa d'Espanya			Cup		Regional		Pyrenees Cup		Friendly		Total	
Club	Season	Division	Apps	Goals	Apps	Goals	Apps	Goals	Apps	Goals	Apps	Goals	Apps	Goals
FC Barcelona	1911–12	La Liga	0	0	0	0	1	3	0	0	4	2	5	5
FC Barcelona	1912–13	La Liga	2	5	2	0	0	0	1	2	20	22	25	31
FC Barcelona	1913–14	La Liga	0	0	0	0	6	1	2	1	30	23	37	24
FC Barcelona	1914–15	La Liga	0	0	0	0	9	4	0	0	23	29	32	33
FC Barcelona	1915–16	La Liga	0	0	4	4	11	25	0	0	14	12	29	41
FC Barcelona	1917–18	La Liga	0	0	0	0	2	0	0	0	4	4	6	4
FC Barcelona	1918–19	La Liga	0	0	5	7	12	11	0	0	21	29	38	47
FC Barcelona	1919–20	La Liga	0	0	3	3	9	14	0	0	29	34	41	51
FC Barcelona	1920–21	La Liga	0	0	0	0	8	7	0	0	11	13	19	20
FC Barcelona	1921–22	La Liga	0	0	4	8	8	19	0	0	12	18	24	45
FC Barcelona	1922–23	La Liga	0	0	0	0	8	7	0	0	32	32	40	39
FC Barcelona	1923–24	La Liga	0	0	7	8	7	4	0	0	36	29	50	41
FC Barcelona	1924–25	La Liga	0	0	2	0	1	0	0	0	10	4	13	4
FC Barcelona	1925–26	La Liga	0	0	6	3	14	4	0	0	8	7	28	14
FC Barcelona	1926–27	La Liga	0	0	4	2	4	2	0	0	9	6	17	10
FC Barcelona	1932–33	La Liga	0	0	0	0	0	0	0	0	1	0	1	0
FC Barcelona	Total		2	5	37	35	99	100	3	3	264	264	405	407
Career total			2	5	37	35	99	100	3	3	264	264	405	407

=== International ===
Scores and results list Spain's goal tally first.

List of international goals scored by Paulino Alcántara
No.	Date	Venue	Opponent	Score	Result	Competition
1.	9 October 1921	San Mamés Stadium, Bilbao, Spain	Belgium	1–0	2–0	Friendly
2.	9 October 1921	San Mamés Stadium, Bilbao, Spain	Belgium	2–0	2–0	Friendly
3.	18 December 1921	Campo de O'Donnell, Madrid, Spain	Portugal	1–0	3–1	Friendly
4.	18 December 1921	Campo de O'Donnell, Madrid, Spain	Portugal	2–0	3–1	Friendly
5.	30 April 1922	Stade Sainte-Germaine, Le Bouscat, France	France	1–0	4–0	Friendly
6.	30 April 1922	Stade Sainte-Germaine, Le Bouscat, France	France	2–0	4–0	Friendly

Scores and results list Philippines's goal tally first.

List of international goals scored by Paulino Alcántara
No.	Date	Venue	Opponent	Score	Result	Competition
1	10 May 1917	Shibaura Ground, Tokyo, Japan	Japan	2–0	15–2	Far Eastern Championship
2	10 May 1917	Shibaura Ground, Tokyo, Japan	Japan	?-?	15–2	Far Eastern Championship
3	10 May 1917	Shibaura Ground, Tokyo, Japan	Japan	?–?	15–2	Far Eastern Championship
4	10 May 1917	Shibaura Ground, Tokyo, Japan	Japan	?–?	15–2	Far Eastern Championship
5	10 May 1917	Shibaura Ground, Tokyo, Japan	Japan	?–?	15–2	Far Eastern Championship
6	10 May 1917	Shibaura Ground, Tokyo, Japan	Japan	?–?	15–2	Far Eastern Championship

Scores and results list Catalonia's goal tally first.

List of international goals scored by Paulino Alcántara
No.	Date	Venue	Opponent	Score	Result	Competition
1.	19 May 1915	Campo de O'Donnell, Madrid, Spain	Castile	1–0	2–1	1915 Prince of Asturias Cup
2.	6 February 1921	Camp Muntaner, Barcelona, Spain	(Aquitaine) South West France		5–1	Friendly
3.	6 February 1921	Camp Muntaner, Barcelona, Spain	(Aquitaine) South West France		5–1	Friendly
4.	3 April 1921	Camp Muntaner, Barcelona, Spain	Badalona		4–0	Friendly
5.	19 September 1926	Guinardó, Barcelona, Spain	Asturias	3–1	4–3	1926 Prince of Asturias Cup

== Honors ==
FC Barcelona

- Catalan football championship: (10) 1913, 1916, 1919, 1920, 1921, 1922, 1924, 1925, 1926, 1927
- Copa del Rey: (5) 1913, 1920, 1922, 1925, 1926
- Pyrenees Cup: (2) 1912, 1913

Bohemian S.C.

- Philippine National Men's Open Championship (2): 1917, 1918

Philippine national football team

- Far Eastern Championship Games: (Silver medal) 1917

== See also ==
- List of footballers who achieved hat-trick records
- List of Spain international footballers born outside Spain
