= Japan 2–15 Philippines =

- Event: 1917 Far Eastern Games
Japan	Philippines
(Japan)	(Philippines)
2	15
- Date: 10 May 1917
- Venue: Shibaura Ground, Tokyo, Japan
- Referee: Wiles

On 10 May 1917, the association football teams of the Philippines and Japan faced each other at the 1917 Far Eastern Games. The tournament was contested by Japan, the Philippines and China. The Japanese team was represented by a selection from the Tokyo Higher Normal School. Paulino Alcántara, a renowned football player, was part of the Philippine squad who led the Philippines to its biggest recorded victory in an international football match which also became Japan's biggest defeat. However, Japan got their revenge 50 years later in 1967, beating the Philippines 15–0 which became the biggest defeat for the Philippines national team. However, this match is not recognized as an official international match by the Japan Football Association.

== Details ==
10 May 1917
9:35

Japan	2–15	Philippines
Fujii (-)	Report	Alcántara 3' (-); Altonaga (-); Lamas (-); Mario (-); Guenat (-)

Shibaura Ground, Tokyo
Referee: Wiles

JAPAN:
GK	Genya Tomita
FR	Gokichi Haga
FL	Gunji Takei
HR	Hirosaburo Yoshiki
HC	Hirosaburo Takenouchi
HL	Kumanosuke Ueyama
OR	Toshitsuna Watanabe
IR	Hitoshi Sasaki
CF	Junichi Okubo
IL	Harukichi Fujii
OL	Noboru Nukata
Substitutes:
	Kinichi Osugi
	Seiichiro Toyosaki
	Mitsuo Ishikawa
	Ryuichi Yamamoto
	Iwao Kageyama
Manager:
Unknown

PHILIPPINES:
GK	Evangelista
FR	Joaquín Loyzaga
FL	Manuel Nieto
HR	Moreno
HC	Lovets
HL	García
OR	Lamas
IR	Zé Guenat
CF	Paulino Alcántara
IL	Altonaga
OL	Mario
Substitutes:
Unknown
Manager:
Unknown

== Aftermath ==
At least one milestone was reached, aside from the record scoreline made in this match. Haruyoshi Fujii became Japan's first goalscorer in an international competitive football match by scoring Japan's two goals.

The Philippines later faced the Republic of China in a de facto final, but this was abandoned after 55 minutes; after the Chinese converted a penalty making the scoreline 3–0, the Filipino goalkeeper punched the Chinese goalscorer in the face, which started a brawl involving both sides.

== See also ==
- Japan 15–0 Philippines
