= Football at the 1930 Far Eastern Championship Games =

Tournament details
- Host country: Japan
- Dates: 25-30 May
- Teams: 3
- Venue: 1 (in 1 host city)

Final positions
- Champions: China; Japan (8th title)

Tournament statistics
- Matches played: 3
- Goals scored: 20 (6.67 per match)
- Top scorer(s): (Japan) Takeo Wakabayashi (4 goals)

Football at the 1930 Far Eastern Games, held in Tokyo, Japan was won by China.

== Teams ==
- China
- Japan
- Philippines

== Results ==
Team	Pld	W	D	L	GF	GA	Pts
China (Note: The RSSSF reports that Japan refused to play extra time in their match against China, with China awarded the gold medal; Japan Soccer Archives dispute this, stating that Japan and China shared the title due to being equal on points, as goal difference was not used as a tiebreaker at the Games.)	2	1	1	0	8	3	3
Japan	2	1	1	0	10	5	3
Philippines	2	0	0	2	2	12	0

May 25, 1930

Japan	7–2	Philippines
Wakabayashi 10', 12', 22', 51' ? 16' (o.g.); Teshima 32'; Ichihashi 86'	Report (RSSSF); JFA	Pacheco

Meiji Jingu Gaien Stadium, Tokyo

May 27, 1930

China	5–0	Philippines
Dai Linjing 14', 27', 30'; Ye Beihua (?); Suen Kam Shun (?)	Report (RSSSF)

Meiji Jingu Gaien Stadium, Tokyo
Attendance: 36,000
Referee: Hirosaburo Takeuchi (Japan)

May 30, 1930

China	3–3	Japan
Suen Kam Shun 40'; Chan Kwong Yiu 60'; Dai Linjing 70'	Report (RSSSF); JFA	Teshima 23'; Takayama 57'; Shinojima 73'

Meiji Jingu Gaien Stadium, Tokyo
Referee: Hirosaburo Takeuchi (Japan)

== Winner ==
1930 Far Eastern Championship Games

China
Eighth title

== Statistics ==
=== Goalscorers ===
There were 20 goals scored in 3 matches, for an average of 6.67 goals per match.

4 goals

- (Japan) Takeo Wakabayashi

3 goals

- (Republic of China (1912–1949)) Dai Linjing

2 goals

- (Republic of China (1912–1949)) Suen Kam Shun
- (Japan) Shiro Teshima
- (Philippines) Emilio Pacheco

1 goal

- (Japan) Hideo Shinojima
- (Japan) Tokizo Ichihashi
- (Japan) Tadao Takayama
- (Republic of China (1912–1949)) Chan Kwong Yiu
- (Republic of China (1912–1949)) Dai Linjing
- (Republic of China (1912–1949)) Ye Beihua

2 own goals

- (Japan) Takeo Wakabayashi (against Philippines)
