= Pang Wah Hing =

Chinese footballer

Personal information
- Full name: Peng Huaxing

International career
Years	Team	Apps	(Gls)
1925	China	1	(1)

Pang Wah Hing (simplified Chinese: 彭华兴; traditional Chinese: 彭華興; pinyin: Péng Huáxìng) was a Chinese footballer who played for the China national football team.

== Career statistics ==
=== International ===
National team	Year	Apps	Goals
China	1925	1	1
Total		1	1

=== International goals ===
Scores and results list China's goal tally first.

No	Date	Venue	Opponent	Score	Result	Competition
1.	22 May 1925	Rizal Memorial Stadium, Manila, Philippines	Philippines	2–0	5–1	1925 Far Eastern Championship Games
