= Dai Linjing =

Chinese footballer

Personal information
- Date of birth: 1906
- Place of birth: Chongde, Zhejiang, China
- Date of death: 1968 (aged 61–62)
- Height: 1.70 m (5 ft 7 in)
- Position: Forward

Senior career*
Years	Team	Apps	(Gls)
1926–1932	Shanghai Lehua		
1932–1934	Indonesia China		
1934–1945	Shanghai Donghua		

International career
1930	China	2	(4)

Managerial career
- 1951–1957: Bayi Football Team
- 1957–1958: China
- 1959: Bayi Football Team
- * Club domestic league appearances and goals

Dai Linjing (simplified Chinese: 戴麟经; traditional Chinese: 戴麟經; pinyin: Dài Línjīng) was a Chinese footballer who played as a forward for the China national football team.

== Career statistics ==
=== International ===
National team	Year	Apps	Goals
China	1930	2	4
Total		2	4

=== International goals ===
Scores and results list China's goal tally first.

No	Date	Venue	Opponent	Score	Result	Competition
1.	27 May 1930	Meiji Jingu Gaien Stadium, Tokyo, Japan	Philippines	–	5–0	1930 Far Eastern Championship Games
2.	27 May 1930	Meiji Jingu Gaien Stadium, Tokyo, Japan	Philippines	–	5–0	1930 Far Eastern Championship Games
3.	27 May 1930	Meiji Jingu Gaien Stadium, Tokyo, Japan	Philippines	–	5–0	1930 Far Eastern Championship Games
4.	30 May 1930	Meiji Jingu Gaien Stadium, Tokyo, Japan	Japan	3–2	3–3	1930 Far Eastern Championship Games
