= Suen Kam Shun =

Chinese footballer

Personal information
- Full name: Sun Jinshun
- Date of birth: 4 July 1907
- Place of birth: Singapore
- Date of death: 9 August 1995 (aged 88)
- Place of death: Princess Margaret Hospital, Hong Kong
- Height: 1.68 m (5 ft 6 in)
- Position: Forward

Senior career*
| Years | Team | Apps | (Gls) |
| 1924–1933 | South China | | |
| 1933–1935 | Three Cultures | | |
| 1935–1936 | Tung Wah | | |

International career
| 1925–1936 | China | 7 | (6) |
| 1936 | China Olympic | 1 | (0) |

Managerial career
- People's Liberation Army
- Shanghai Football Team
- * Club domestic league appearances and goals

Suen "Iron Legs" Kam Shun (simplified Chinese: 孙锦顺; traditional Chinese: 孫錦順; pinyin: Sūn Jǐnshùn; 4 July 1907 – 9 August 1995) was a Chinese former footballer who played as a forward for the China national football team during the 1920s. He also represented his nation at the 1936 Summer Olympics in Berlin.

He earned the nickname Iron Legs due to his ability to fiercely strike the ball, reportedly ripping the goal net on more than one occasion.

== Career statistics ==
=== International ===
| National team | Year | Apps | Goals |
|---|---|---|---|
| China | 1925 | 2 | 1 |
| China | 1927 | 2 | 2 |
| China | 1930 | 2 | 2 |
| China | 1936 | 1 | 1 |
| Total | | 7 | 6 |

=== International goals ===
Scores and results list China's goal tally first.

| No | Date | Venue | Opponent | Score | Result | Competition |
|---|---|---|---|---|---|---|
| 1. | 22 May 1925 | Rizal Memorial Stadium, Manila, Philippines | Philippines | 5–1 | 5–1 | 1925 Far Eastern Championship Games |
| 2. | 27 August 1927 | Zhonghua Stadium, Shanghai, China | Japan | 1–0 | 5–1 | 1927 Far Eastern Championship Games |
| 3. | 27 August 1927 | Zhonghua Stadium, Shanghai, China | Japan | 3–0 | 5–1 | 1927 Far Eastern Championship Games |
| 4. | 27 May 1930 | Meiji Jingu Gaien Stadium, Tokyo, Japan | Philippines | 5–0 | 5–0 | 1930 Far Eastern Championship Games |
| 5. | 30 May 1930 | Meiji Jingu Gaien Stadium, Tokyo, Japan | Japan | 1–1 | 3–3 | 1930 Far Eastern Championship Games |
| 6. | 4 July 1936 | Calcutta FC Ground, Calcutta, British India | India | 1–1 | 1–1 | Friendly |
