= Ye Beihua =

Chinese footballer

Personal information
- Date of birth: 2 February 1907
- Place of birth: Huiyang, China
- Date of death: 5 December 1987 (aged 80)
- Place of death: Nanhai, China

International career
Years	Team	Apps	(Gls)
- China

Ye Beihua (2 February 1907 – 5 December 1987) was a Chinese footballer. He competed in the football tournament at the 1936 Summer Olympics.
