= Tam Kong Pak =

Chinese footballer

Personal information
- Full name: Tan Jiangbai
- Date of birth: 27 November 1911
- Place of birth: Canton, China
- Date of death: 16 March 2006 (aged 94)
- Place of death: Hong Kong Sanatorium & Hospital, Hong Kong
- Positions: Defender; forward

Senior career*
Years	Team	Apps	(Gls)
1927–1930	South China		
1930–1931	Canton Police		
1931–1936	South China		
1946–1947	Sing Tao		
1947–1948	KMB Football Team		

International career
1934	China	2	(3)
1936	China Olympic	1	(0)
- * Club domestic league appearances and goals

Tam Kong Pak (Chinese: 譚江柏; pinyin: Tán Jiāngbǎi; Jyutping: taam4 gong1 paak3; 27 November 1911 – 16 March 2006) was a China-born Hong Kong–based former footballer who played as a forward for the China national football team in 1934. He also represented his nation at the 1936 Summer Olympics in Berlin.

== Personal life ==
Tam is the father of Hong Kong singer and actor Alan Tam.

Tam worked was a traffic officer during his season with Canton Police from 1930 to 1931. He was also involved in the transport of supplies on the famed Burma Road when he fled during World War II.

== Career statistics ==
=== International ===
National team	Year	Apps	Goals
China	1934	2	3
Total		2	3

=== International goals ===
Scores and results list China's goal tally first.

No	Date	Venue	Opposing	Score	Result	Contest
1.	12 May 1934	Rizal Memorial Stadium, Manila, Philippines	Philippines	1–0	2–0	1934 Far Eastern Championship Games
2.	20 May 1934	Rizal Memorial Stadium, Manila, Philippines	Japan	1–0	4–3	1934 Far Eastern Championship Games
3.	20 May 1934	Rizal Memorial Stadium, Manila, Philippines	Japan	2–0	4–3	1934 Far Eastern Championship Games
