= Football at the 1919 Far Eastern Championship Games =

Tournament details
- Host country: China
- Teams: 2
- Venue: (in 1 host city)

Final positions
- Champions: China (3rd title)
- Runners-up: Philippines

Tournament statistics
- Matches played: 3
- Goals scored: 8 (2.67 per match)
- Top scorer(s): (Beiyang government) Wong Pak Chung (3 goals)

The football sporting event at the 1919 Far Eastern Championship Games featured matches between China and the Philippines. China was represented by South China A.A.

== Results ==
Team	Pld	W	D	L	GF	GA	GD	Pts
(Beiyang government) China	2	1	0	1	3	2	1	2
Philippines	2	1	0	1	2	3	–1	2

12 May 1919

Philippines	0–2	(Beiyang government) China
	Report	Fuk Cheung ?'; Pak Chung ?'

Manila
13 May 1919

Philippines	2–1	(Beiyang government) China
	Report	Pak Chung ?'

Manila

== Gold medal play-off ==
15 May 1919

Philippines	1–2	(Beiyang government) China
	Report	Po Kan ?'; Pak Chung ?'

Manila

== Winner ==
1919 Far Eastern Games Football champions

China
Third title

== Statistics ==
=== Goalscorers ===
There were 8 goals scored in 3 matches, for an average of 2.67 goals per match.

3 goals

- (Beiyang government) Wong Pak Chung

1 goal

- (Beiyang government) Tong Fuk Cheung
- (Beiyang government) Kwok Po Kan
