= Football at the 1921 Far Eastern Championship Games =

Tournament details
- Host country: China
- Teams: 3
- Venue: (in 1 host city)

Final positions
- Champions: China (4th title)
- Runners-up: Philippines

Tournament statistics
- Matches played: 3
- Goals scored: 9 (3 per match)
- Top scorer(s): (Beiyang government) Yip Kao Ko (2 goals)

The football sporting event at the 1921 Far Eastern Championship Games featured matches between China, Japan and the Philippines.

China was represented by the club side South China AA, who reportedly had beaten East China (Shanghai) for the right to do so: Before the tournament, on 26 May, China (South China A.A.) played a practice match against "a team representing East China" at Nanyang Field in front of 3,000 people, which they won 3-1.

== Results ==
Team	Pld	W	D	L	GF	GA	GD	Pts
(Beiyang government) China	2	2	0	0	5	1	4	4
Philippines	2	1	0	1	3	1	2	2
Japan	2	0	0	2	1	7	–6	0

30 May 1921

Philippines	3–1	Japan
	Report

Shanghai
Referee: A.H. Leslie

31 May 1921

(Beiyang government) China	1–0	Philippines
Kao Ko ?'	Report

Shanghai
Referee: W.C.G. Clifford

1 June 1921

(Beiyang government) China	4–0	Japan
Kao Ko ?'; Pak Chung ?'; Kit Sang ?' ? ?'	Report

Shanghai
Attendance: 25,000

== Winner ==
1921 Far Eastern Games Football champions

China
Fourth title

== Statistics ==
=== Goalscorers ===
There were 9 goals scored in 3 matches, for an average of 3 goals per match.

2 goals

- (Beiyang government) Yip Kao Ko

1 goal

- (Beiyang government) Wong Pak Chung
- (Beiyang government) Aw Kit Sang

== Aftermath ==
After the tournament, at least two matches were played in the Open International Championship:

3 June 1921

(Beiyang government) China	3–0	Japan
	Report

Shanghai

4 June 1921

"Great Britain"	1–0	(Beiyang government) China
	Report

Shanghai

"Great Britain" was a selection of British residents in Shanghai
