= Lee Wai Tong =

Chinese footballer (1905–1979)

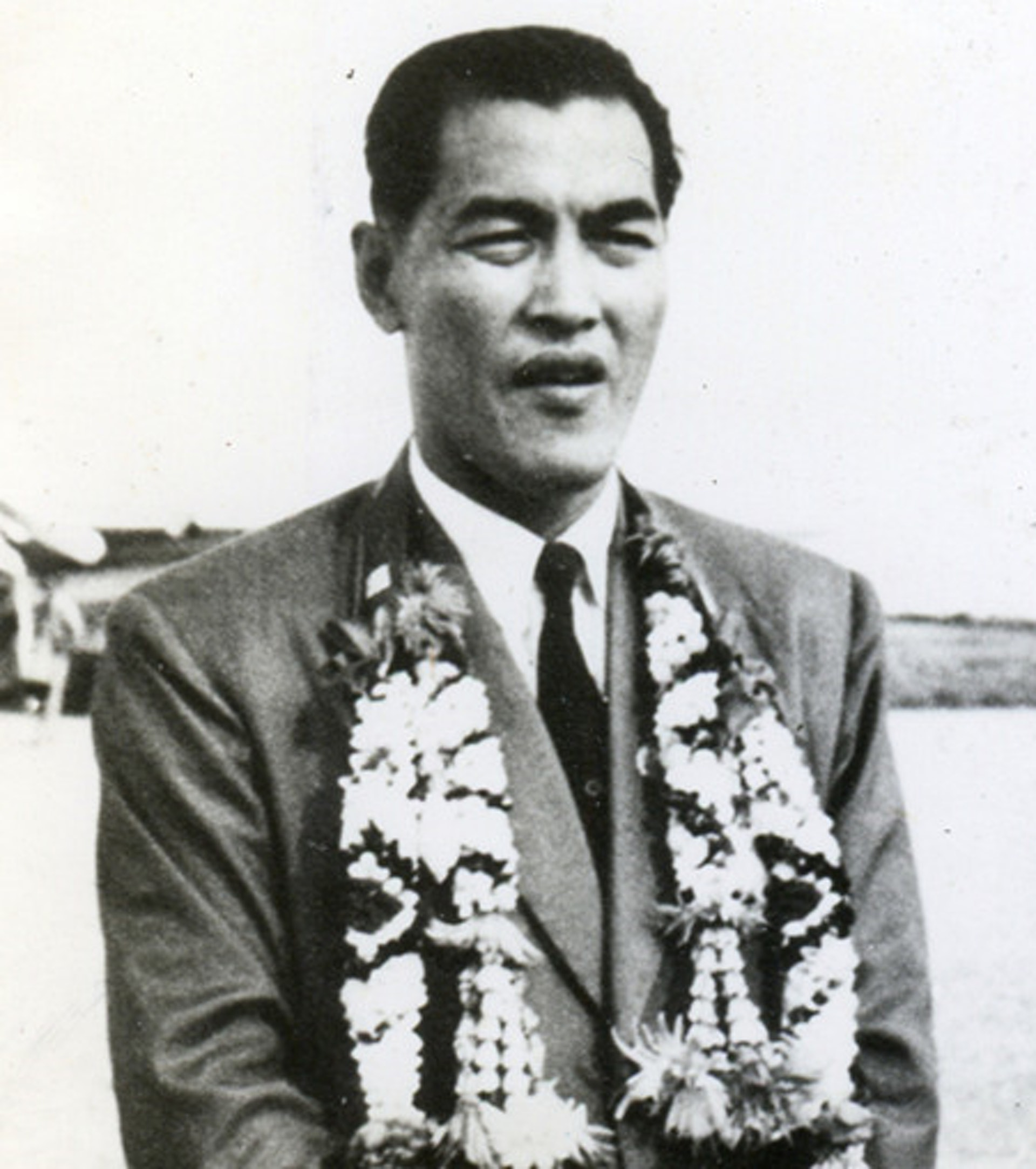
- Lee in 1950

Personal information
- Date of birth: 16 October 1905
- Place of birth: Tai Hang, Hong Kong Island, British Hong Kong
- Date of death: 4 July 1979 (aged 73)
- Place of death: St. Teresa's Hospital, Kowloon, British Hong Kong
- Height: 1.80 m (5 ft 11 in)
- Position: Striker

Youth career
- 1922: South China

Senior career*
Years	Team	Apps	(Gls)
1923–1926	South China		
1926–1930	Loh Hwa		
1930-1932	South China		
1932-1933	UMS Batavia		
1933	VBO Batavia		
1933-1947	South China		

International career
1923–1941	China	13	(13)

Managerial career
- 1926–1930: Fudan University
- 1934: China
- 1948: China
- 1954–1960: Republic of China
- 1966–?: Ming Chuan College (women)
Medal record
Men's football
Representing Taiwan (as manager)
AFC Asian Cup
Third place	1960 South Korea
Asian Games
Gold medal – first place	1954 Manila
Gold medal – first place	1958 Tokyo
- * Club domestic league appearances and goals

Lee Wai Tong
- Chinese: 李惠堂
- Jyutping: Lei5 Wai6 Tong4
- Cantonese Yale: Léih Waih Tòhng
Transcriptions
Standard Mandarin
- Hanyu Pinyin: Lǐ Huìtáng
- Wade–Giles: Li Hui-t'ang
Yue: Cantonese
- Yale Romanization: Léih Waih Tòhng
- Jyutping: Lei5 Wai6 Tong4

Lee Wai Tong (Chinese: 李惠堂; 16 October 1905 – 4 July 1979) was a Hong Kong and Chinese international association football player, head coach, and former Vice President of FIFA. He is often regarded as the greatest Chinese footballer, due to his accomplishments in winning several Far Eastern Games titles with the national team of the Republic of China as well as captaining the national football squad on a 13-year unbeaten run in competitive games from 1923 to 1936, a streak that ended at their first ever Olympic tournament (held in Berlin).

This was also followed by having an extremely successful club career as a forward with the Hong Kong club South China where he won eight league titles with them, helping establish the club as the most successful team in the territory's history at the time. After his retirement, he moved into management where he guided the national men's football team of the Republic of China (which later played as Taiwan and Chinese Taipei) to win the 1954 Asian Games. Lee, nicknamed the "King of Asian football", was said to have scored at least 1,260 goals during his 25-year playing career, although some would claim that this figure may have been closer to 2,000.

== Early life ==
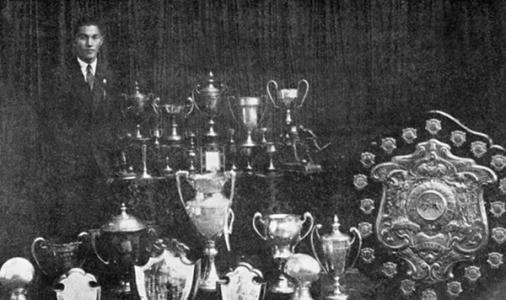
Lee Wai Tong poses with various trophies he won over his career.

Lee Wai Tong was born in Tai Hang, Hong Kong, just outside the city, as the third child to a construction firm owner before he moved back to his parents home of Ng-Wah County in Mei-Chow, Kwangtung, China at the age of four. His father was born in Hong Kong while mother was Chen Qiongsheng, from Hsiang-Shan, Kwangtung Province (now Zhongshan). It was there that he was informally taught how to play football until he moved back to Hong Kong and was formally trained at Queen's College, Hong Kong.

== Playing career ==
=== Club career ===
Lee left school early initially to help his father's construction company before he joined South China AA, a Hong Kong top division team, as a youth player in 1922. He rose through the ranks quickly, and by 1923, he already had graduated to the senior team where he quickly showed himself as being a highly talented striker. Lee then helped the club win the 1923–24 Hong Kong First Division League title. His international reputation was solidified when he was able to retain the Far Eastern Championship Games Gold medal in the 1925 championship held in Manila, Philippines. These successful tournaments saw him reported as the greatest Chinese footballer at the time by the Chinese media. After these successes Lee returned to China and joined Fudan University in Shanghai as an athletic director. This allowed him the opportunity to join Loh Hwa, a gregarious team who were built from St. John's University, Shanghai, Shanghai Jiao Tong University, University of Shanghai, Jinan University and his own Fudan University sports team where they predominantly played in local and regional championships because they offered the only annual competitions within China during the amateur era.

In 1931, Lee returned to South China and won the 1932–33 Hong Kong First Division League title for the club. This would soon be followed by winning the 1934–35 and 1935–36 league titles, which was the first time they were able to retain the title.

After the Olympic Games, his football career was cut short by the Second Sino-Japanese War and World War II. Initially, Lee continued with his club career with South China until Hong Kong was also occupied by the Japanese. Lee was able to escape to Kwangtung (Guangdong) and joined the Chinese Army where he spent the war playing exhibition games to raise money for the war effort. He was promoted to major general within the sports division before returning to South China after the war. After spending several seasons with the club he retired in 1948 at the age of 43.

=== International career ===
In May 1923, at the age of 17, Lee was called up to the China national team to represent them in the football tournament of the 1923 Far Eastern Championship Games held in Osaka, Japan. Despite still being a minor, his prolific goalscoring at club level earned him a place on the team and marked the start of an illustrious career which lasted for the next twenty years. On 18 August, aged 17 years, 10 months and 2 days, Lee made his debut for China, becoming the youngest player to appear for the national team. He held this record for more than a century, until it was surpassed on 24 September 2026 by Zhao Songyuan, who made his debut at the age of 17 years, 5 months and 17 days. In the last match of the tournament, Lee scored a hat-trick in a 5–1 win over Japan on 24 May, at the age of 17 years and 217 days, thus becoming the youngest ever hat-trick scorer in an international competition, a record that still stands and only Pelé came the closest to breaking it (17 years and 241 days). China won the championship and Lee was considered the young stand-out star of the tournament. In the following edition in 1925, Lee scored five goals; a brace against Japan and a hat-trick against the Philippines, thus contributing decisively in China winning its 6th title of the competition.

Lee and China would go on a 13-year unbeaten run in competitive games from 1923 to 1936. He captained China to their first ever Olympic tournament in Berlin 1936, making them the first Asian nation, alongside Japan, to take part in that tournament. Lee would, however struggle to see his nation participate in their first truly worldwide tournament when the Chinese government could only give 170,000 from the required 220,000 yuan the team needed to get to the Berlin Olympics. China played a series of exhibition games against French Indochina, Singapore, the Dutch East Indies, Malaya, Burma (Myanmar) and India to gain the necessary funds for the trip. The team would reach their target and Lee would captain the side against Great Britain in the last 16 within the tournament.

In total, Lee played 13 matches for China, scoring 13 goals.

== Management career and the AFC ==
Lee Wai Tong's first coaching experience came while he was still a player and he took a job with Fudan University while he played for Loh Hwa. With him also captaining the Chinese side and the team not having any permanent coach Lee would manage the side for the 1934 Far Eastern Championship Games, which he also played in as China won the tournament.

In 1948 the China national team reappointed Lee as coach, this time for the 1948 Summer Olympics. On a self-financed training course in the Philippines and Thailand, he took the team away for three months while they prepared for the trip to London. At the tournament, China faced Turkey in the first round and lost 4-0. After the defeat Lee returned to China in the middle of the Chinese Civil War and did not coach until after the conflict. By then his team had been split into two, the Republic of China team (later renamed Chinese Taipei as the team was unable to use either Taiwan or China in the FIFA membership) and the People's Republic of China team (which is considered by the FIFA the legitimate heir of pre-WWII China records). In 1954 Lee decided to join the ROC team as their first permanent coach and lead them to win the 1954 Asian Games. He would continue to coach the team at the 1958 Asian Games where he guided the team to win the tournament once more by beating South Korea 3–2 in the final.

Along with his stint as coach, Lee was elected as a Secretary-General of the Asian Football Confederation in 1954. In 1965 he became the Vice President of FIFA, being the first ethnic Chinese person to reach that position.

In 1979, ROC President Chiang Ching-kuo issued a decree praising Lee for his contributions to football on Taiwan.

== Honours ==
=== Player ===
South China

- Hong Kong First Division: 1923–24, 1932–33, 1934–35, 1935–36, 1937–38, 1938–39, 1939–40, 1940–41

Voetbalbond Batavia en Omstreken (VBO)

- Dutch East Indies Championship: 1933

UMS Batavia

- HNVB Chineesche Stedenwedstrijden: 1932-1933

Republic of China

- Far Eastern Games: 1923, 1925, 1927, 1930, 1934

=== Manager ===
Republic of China

- AFC Asian Cup: 3rd place, 1960
- Asian Games: Gold medal, 1954, 1958

== See also ==
- List of footballers who achieved hat-trick records
