= Tong Fuk Cheung =

British Hong Kong-born Chinese footballer

Personal information
- Date of birth: 1893
- Place of birth: British Hong Kong
- Date of death: 1953 (aged 59–60)
- Place of death: British Hong Kong
- Position: Midfielder

Senior career*
| Years | Team | Apps | (Gls) |
| 1910–1911 | St. Joseph's | | |
| 1911–1912 | South China | | |
| 1912–1916 | – | | |
| 1916–1921 | South China | | |

International career
| 1913–1921 | China | 1 | (1) |

Managerial career
- 1925–1930: Lingnan University
- 1931–1934: China
- * Club domestic league appearances and goals

Tong Fuk Cheung (Chinese: 唐福祥) was a Chinese footballer who played for the China national football team. He was the first captain of the China national team, and scored their very first goal in 1913.

== Career statistics ==
=== International ===
| National team | Year | Apps | Goals |
|---|---|---|---|
| China | 1913 | 1 | 1 |
| Total | | 1 | 1 |

=== International goals ===
Scores and results list China's goal tally first.

| No | Date | Venue | Opponent | Score | Result | Competition |
|---|---|---|---|---|---|---|
| 1. | 4 February 1913 | Carnival Grounds, Manila, Philippines | Philippines | – | 1–2 | 1913 Far Eastern Championship Games |
