= Football at the 1915 Far Eastern Championship Games =

Tournament details
- Host country: China
- Teams: 2
- Venue: (in 1 host city)

Final positions
- Champions: China (1st title)
- Runners-up: Philippines

Tournament statistics
- Matches played: 2
- Goals scored: 1 (0.5 per match)
- Top scorer(s): (Beiyang government) Kwok Po Kan (1 goal)

The football sporting event at the 1915 Far Eastern Championship Games was a two legged match between China and the Philippines. The Chinese football club, South China A.A. represented the Chinese side having won the right to do so after winning against Nanyang and Canton. The first match ended with a draw in which both sides saw one player being sent off and the second match was won by China 1–0. It was reported that the second match also ended in a 1–1 draw, but this is likely due to a confusion with the semifinal at the extra tournament. An extra tournament was also held between the Philippines, South China A.A., Nanyang and Shanghai Britons which was won by the Shanghai Britons.

== Results ==
Team	Pld	W	D	L	GF	GA	GD	Pts
(Beiyang government) China	2	1	1	0	1	0	1	3
Philippines	2	0	1	1	0	1	–1	1

18 May 1915

China (Beiyang government)	0–0	Philippines
	Report

Hongkou Stadium, Shanghaihttps://www.11v11.com/matches/china-v-philippines-30-april-1915-222991/

Both teams had one player sent off

19 May 1915

China (Beiyang government)	1–0	Philippines
Kwai Sam ?'	Report

Hongkou Stadium, Shanghaihttps://www.11v11.com/matches/china-v-philippines-30-april-1915-222991/

== Winner ==
1915 Far Eastern Games Football champions

China
First title

== Statistics ==
=== Goalscorers ===
There was 1 goal scored in 2 matches, for an average of 0.5 goals per match.

1 goal

- (Beiyang government) Kwok Po Kan

== Extra Tournament ==
=== Semifinals ===
South China A.A. (Hong Kong)	3–1	Philippines
	Report

Shanghai

Shanghai Britons	8–0	(China) Nanyang
	Report

Shanghai

=== Final ===
Shanghai Britons	2–0	(Hong Kong) South China A.A.
	Report

Shanghai
