= Football at the 1913 Far Eastern Championship Games =

Tournament details
- Host country: Philippines
- Dates: 4 February
- Teams: 2
- Venue: 1 (in 1 host city)

Final positions
- Champions: Philippines (1st title)

Tournament statistics
- Matches played: 1
- Goals scored: 3 (3 per match)

The football sporting event at the 1913 Far Eastern Championship Games only had one match which took place between Republic of China and the Philippines. The Republic of China was formed above all ex players of the South China AA (Nan Hua), the Chinese standard bearing club, which had been disbanded two years previously for financial reasons. Its members joined two (non-sporting) entities: Lin Lang/Lin Lam, a theatrical organisation, and Kong Shenghui, where they formed teams. The Philippines combined their two best teams Bohemian and Sandow for a strong combination, as the result confirmed. China, 1-0 down at half-time, protested that the Philippines team was made up of Europeans and not native Filipinos, citing Henry Doland, the son of an American, in particular. The organisers placated them saying that although the team included players of Spanish origins they had all been born in the Philippines, and that there were no 'native' players available. The winning goal was scored by captain Damaso Garcia.

Team	Pld	W	D	L	GF	GA	GD	Pts
Philippines	1	1	0	0	2	1	+1	2
(Beiyang government) China	1	0	0	1	1	2	–1	0

4 February 1913

Philippines	2–1	(Beiyang government) China
Manuel Nieto (penalty), Damaso Garcia	Report	Tong Fuk Cheung ?'

Carnival Grounds, Manila
Attendance: 10,000

Numbers indicated inside the parenthesis are figures reported by "Soccer in China"

== Winner ==
1913 Far Eastern Games Football champions

Philippines
First title

== See also ==
List of first association football internationals per country: 1872–1940
