= Football at the 1917 Far Eastern Championship Games =

Tournament details
- Host country: Japan
- Dates: 9–11 May
- Teams: 3
- Venue: 1 (in 1 host city)

Final positions
- Champions: China
- Runners-up: Philippines
- Third place: Japan

Tournament statistics
- Matches played: 3
- Goals scored: 25 (8.33 per match)
- Top scorer(s): (Beiyang government) Tong Fuk Cheung (Beiyang government) Fung Kin Wai (3 goals)

The football sporting event at the 1917 Far Eastern Championship Games was contested by three nations; Philippines, China and football debutant and hosts Japan. China was represented by South China A.A. and Japan was represented by a selection from the Tokyo Higher Normal School.

== Results ==
Team	Pld	W	D	L	GF	GA	GD	Pts
China	2	2	0	0	8	0	+8	4
Philippines	2	1	0	1	15	5	+10	2
Japan	2	0	0	2	2	20	–18	0

Note: While the Philippines were ranked second, this is debatable, since they withdrew after causing a brawl that led to the abandonment of their match against China.

9 May 1917
10:30

Japan	0–5	China
		Fung Kin Wai 3', 22', ?'; Kwok Po Kan 28'; Tong Fuk Cheung 30'

Shibaura Ground, Tokyo
Referee: Wiles

10 May 1917

Japan	2–15	Philippines
Fujii ?', ?'		Alcántara 3', ?'; Altonaga ?'; Lamas ?'; Mario ?'; Guenat ?'

Shibaura Ground, Tokyo
Referee: Wiles

At least one milestone was reached, aside from the record scoreline made in this match: Haruyoshi Fujii became Japan's first goalscorer in an international competitive football match by scoring Japan's two goals.

11 May 1917
9:40

China	3–0 Abandoned	Philippines
Yip Kwan 5'; Tong Fuk Cheung 10', 55' (pen.)	Report

Shibaura Ground, Tokyo
Referee: Wiles

The match was abandoned in the 55th minute with China leading 3–0. After Cheung had scored China's third goal from a penalty, the Filipino goalkeeper punched Cheung in the face, sparking a brawl which was broken up by match officials and police: consequently, the Philippines had several players (including the goalkeeper) sent off, and withdrew from the tournament.

== Winner ==
1917 Far Eastern Games Football champions

China
Second title

== Statistics ==
=== Goalscorers ===
There were 25 goals scored in 3 matches, for an average of 8.33 goals per match.

3 goals

- (Beiyang government) Tong Fuk Cheung
- (Beiyang government) Fung Kin Wai

2 goals

- (Japan) Haruyoshi Fujii
- (Philippines) Paulino Alcántara

1 goal

- (Beiyang government) Ye Kun
- (Beiyang government) Kwok Po Kan
- (Philippines) Altonaga
- (Philippines) Lamas
- (Philippines) Mario
- (Philippines) Zé Guenat
