= Great Chinese Football Dream =

Sports project in China

The Great Chinese Football Dream is a project presented by the Chinese President Xi Jinping, aiming to promote soccer in the country with the aim of winning the World Cup by 2050.

== History ==
Despite the size of its population, China has had historically poor football results. As late as the 1970s, China joined FIFA—after a brief spell between 1954 and 1958— and the AFC when the United Nations recognized the People's Republic of China in Beijing as the representative government of China, at the expense of the Republic of China in Taipei, which would subsequently compete under the name of Chinese Taipei. China only needed to go unbeaten in a match against Hong Kong to qualify for the 1986 FIFA World Cup. However, despite being the favorites, China lost 2–1 in a match later remembered as the 19 May incident, which sparked riots and outrage among football pundits. China eventually qualified for the 2002 World Cup but were eliminated after losing all of their three group stage matches and without scoring a goal. In 2009, Chinese football was shaken up by a corruption scandal, which Xi (then vice president) was committed to cleaning up. In 2011, China ranked 71st in FIFA Men's World Ranking.

=== Project ===
In 2011, before being elected general secretary of the Chinese Communist Party (paramount leader), Xi announced a plan to turn China into a footballing powerhouse, which he called "The Great Chinese Soccer Dream" (Chinese: 大国足球梦; pinyin: Dàguó zúqiú mèng). Xi pledged to reorganize the entire footballing system and to build up a new generation of players. In particular, Xi told a South Korean politician that he had three wishes: China qualifying for a World Cup, hosting a World Cup and finally winning a World Cup by the year 2050. Football thus became a state priority in PRC politics. In 2012, a plan to make football the national sport was launched, with football being included in school curricula and the increase of football fields from 5,000 to 50,000. The PRC aimed to attract both public and private investors.

Chinese businessmen began acquiring shares of large European clubs, such as AC Milan, Manchester City and Atlético Madrid. In 2016, the Chinese Football Association (CFA) unveiled a plan to carry out such a project consisting of building 20,000 training centers and 70,000 football pitches, with one pitch per 10,000 inhabitants. China was projected to be a major Asian national team by 2030 and a "first-class football superpower" by 2050. At that time, Chinese Super League (CSL) clubs began making exorbitant bids so as to sign world-class footballers—Brazilian Alex Texeira was purchased by Jiangsu F.C. for $54M, Hulk went to Shanghai SIPG on a $60M deal and 25-year old Oscar followed with a fee of $65M. CSL clubs spent as a whole a total of $451M, ranking among the five highest-spending leagues of the 2015–16 season. Players were also enticed into joining Chinese clubs with huge salaries; Oscar was reportedly paid $106M a year. Ninety broadcasters, including ESPN, began broadcasting Chinese Super League fixtures.

In 2016, Italian 2006 World Cup winner coach Marcello Lippi was appointed as coach of the China national team. However, China failed to qualify for Russia 2018. After China failed to get better results, the country began naturalizing foreign footballers, such as Brazilian-born Elkeson in hopes to qualify for the 2022 World Cup in Qatar. Chinese Football Association vice-president Li Yu confirmed the ambition to make the CSL the sixth world football league.

Additionally, seven Chinese firms were among the sponsors of the 2018 World Cup.

=== Decline ===
In the wake of the COVID-19 pandemic, Chinese clubs entered a state of crisis owing to a lack of revenue due to three years of lockdown, which caused eleven clubs to go bankrupt including former AFC Champions League winning club Liaoning FC. Ten of sixteen clubs owned by real estate companies, such as Jiangsu Suning, Guangzhou City FC and Tianjin Tianhai, also suffered from a real estate crisis beginning in 2021. Jiangsu Suning, bought by the Suning Group, shut down shortly after winning the 2020 Chinese Super League, to focus on their retail business.

China failed to qualify for the 2022 World Cup after being defeated 3–1 by Vietnam in Hanoi in early February. On 6 September 2024, China lost 7–0 away to rivals Japan in Saitama in the opening game of the 2026 World Cup qualifiers. China also failed to qualify for the 2026 World Cup. In December 2024, Li Tie, who coached China between 2020 and 2021, was sentenced to 20 years of prison over a bribery scandal. In January 2025, 73 people received a lifetime ban for match fixing, including former CFA president Chen Xuyuan. On 6 January 2025, Guangzhou Evergrande, winners of the 2013 and the 2015 AFC Champions League, disbanded after failing to pay off the club's debts, which analysts linked to the Evergrande Group crisis.

== Reception ==
A 2015 government report called for the Chinese Football Association to be independent from the General Administration of Sport of China (GAS). Rowan Simons, author of Bamboo Goalposts: One Man's Quest to Teach the People's Republic of China to Love Football, said that "China's failure in football has become a national embarrassment and figuring out the reasons has become a national obsession, but to me, the reasons are pretty clear and they tell you a lot about how the country is run." The Chinese political system in the context of its one-party state, with decisions being made from the highest level, was also noted by BBC News as to why football yielded poor results.

Despite FIFA officially forbidding state interference in football associations, CFA president Song Cai was as of 2025 also a Chinese Communist Party Deputy Committee Secretary, whose work was overseen by a GAS official. Mark Dreyer, a sports writer based in Beijing, said: "Everything has to report upwards to Communist Party bosses. It basically means that non-football people are making football decisions, football has to be grassroots-led. You start at the bottom of the pyramid and the talent starts to funnel up to the top."

According to Simons, "If you look at every country where football is really successful, the sport has grown organically as a grassroots activity over the past 100 years. Professional football in China has continually failed because it's supported by nothing - their pyramid is upside down." A Chinese footballer stated that while many players are "good", they lack specific "football IQ". These have been analyzed as the reasons why despite the investments and Xi's endorsement, China has not been able to qualify for the World Cup.
