= Zhang Honggen =

Chinese footballer and coach

Zhang Honggen 張宏根
Personal information
- Full name: Zhang Honggen
- Date of birth: 27 November 1935
- Place of birth: Shanghai, China
- Date of death: 25 November 2003 (aged 67)
- Place of death: Beijing, China
- Height: 1.77 m (5 ft 9 1/2 in)
- Position: Forward

Youth career
- Shanghai Youth Football Team

Senior career*
Years	Team	Apps	(Gls)
- South China

International career
1954–1965	China	51	(3)

Managerial career
- 1970–1973: Beijing Youth Team
- 1977: China
- 1979: China
- 1982: China
- 1994: Dalian Wanda
- 1999: Chengdu Blades
- * Club domestic league appearances and goals as of 7 May 2010

Zhang Honggen (Chinese: 張宏根; 27 November 1935 – 25 November 2003) was a Chinese international football player and coach. As a player, he was one of the first footballers to play for the People's Republic of China at the international level, and as a coach, he was among the first managers to manage a fully professional Chinese football club, with his stint at Dalian Wanda.

== Playing career ==
Zhang Honggen began his football career playing for the South China team until he turned eighteen when he was selected by the Chinese Head coach Li Fenglou to take part in China's first ever qualification for the 1958 FIFA World Cup. Despite not qualifying he was recognised as being China's best ever player. As a vital member of the Chinese team and was praised for being technically sophisticated and having delicate footwork with a clear-head who was also good at both defensive and offensive play. This saw him remain a vital member of the team for several years even though China did not enter any further competitions and by 1965 Zhang Honggen retired due to an injury.

== Management career ==
Despite being only being thirty years old when he retired, Zhang Honggen eventually moved to management with Beijing Youth Team in 1970. After several seasons he replaced Nian Weisi in 1977 as manager of the Chinese football team, however his reign was uneventful and he left after only a year. He returned twice to this position in 1979 and 1982 to help the team for short periods, however these were again uneventful. In the 1985 Summer Universiade he guided China to a third-place position before he moved away from football and took several sport positions that included the National Sports Commission Training Council Advisory Committee, the National Sports Commission and the Sports Services Inc. as well as a position in the Chinese Football Association coaches committee. In 1994, he returned to management with Dalian Wanda and won the league title with them in his first attempt, however after that victory he decided to become the teams advisor. Once more returning to management in 1999 with second tier club Chengdu Blades he only served for a short period because he was diagnosed of gastric cancer and had to resign, and in 2003 he died of gastric pain.

== Honours ==
=== Manager ===
Dalian Wanda

- Chinese Jia-A League: 1994
