= Wang Houjun =

Chinese footballer and coach

Wang Houjun 王后军
Personal information
- Full name: Wang Houjun
- Date of birth: 16 September 1943
- Place of birth: Ningbo, Zhejiang, Republic of China
- Date of death: 21 November 2012 (aged 69)
- Place of death: Shanghai, People's Republic of China
- Height: 1.68 m (5 ft 6 in)
- Position: Forward

Senior career*
| Years | Team | Apps | (Gls) |
| 1961–1975 | Shanghai Football Team | ? | (?) |

International career
| 1965–1971 | China | 2 | (1) |

Managerial career
- 1975–1983: Shanghai Football Team (assistant)
- 1983–1993: Shanghai Football Team
- 1995–1996: Shanghai Pudong
- * Club domestic league appearances and goals as of November 21, 2012

Wang Houjun (simplified Chinese: 王后军; traditional Chinese: 王後軍; pinyin: Wáng Hòujūn; September 16, 1943 – November 21, 2012) was a Chinese international football player and coach.

== Playing career ==
Wang was born in Ningbo, Republic of China on 16 September 1943. Thanks to his football fan father's influence, he began his football career when age 10. He was named in the squad for the Shanghai Football Team in 1961, and in the China national football team in 1965. In the early 70s, he was appointed captain of the national team.

== Management career ==
Wang Houjun retired in 1975 and worked as Fang Renqiu's assistant coach of Shanghai Football Team. He has been named as head coach of Shanghai Football team in 1983, succeeding Fang Renqiu whose retired from football after winning the 5th National Games of the People's Republic of China.

Throughout the 1990s, the Chinese Football Association were demanding more professionalism from their football teams. Shanghai gathered sponsorship from a local company and founded Shanghai Shenhua F.C. in December 1993. Wang Houjun was replaced by Xu Genbao.

In 1995, the newly established Shanghai Pudong F.C. have announced the appointment of Wang Houjun to their first head coach. He led them to become China League Two champions that year, and promotion into the Jia B. However, he resigned for health reasons in the middle of 1996 season. In 1997, he was invited by Guangzhou Songri's new head coach Xu Genbao named as their team leader, but resigned soon.

For the development of youth football, Wang Houjun started a private football school in Shanghai from 1998.

== Death ==
He died of uremia in Shanghai, China, on 21 November 2012, at the age of 69.

== Honours ==
=== Player ===
Shanghai Football Team

- Chinese Jia-A League: 1961, 1962

=== Manager ===
Shanghai Football Team

- Chinese FA Cup: 1991

Shanghai Pudong

- China League Two: 1995
