= Football in China =

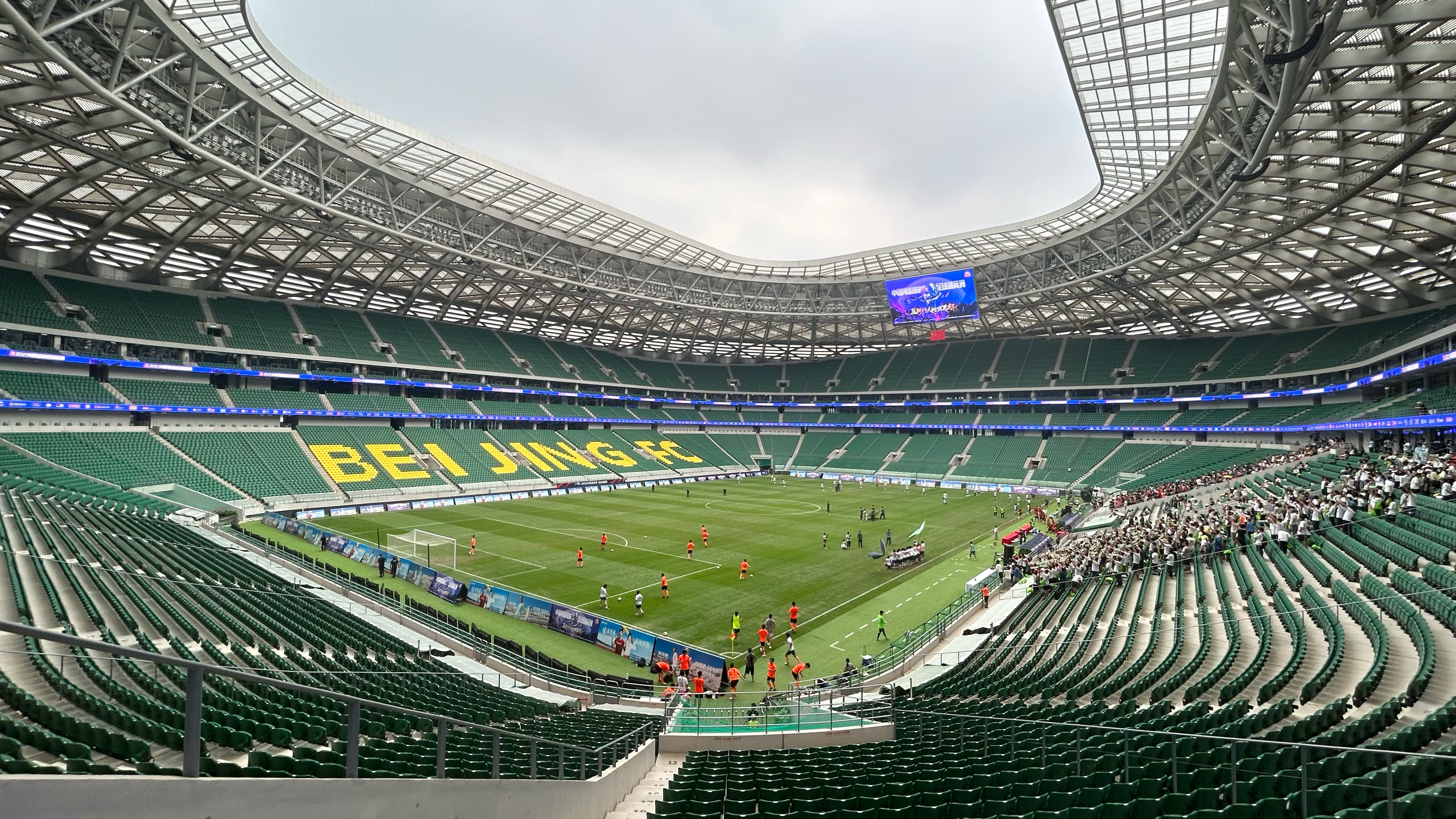
The Workers' Stadium in Beijing.

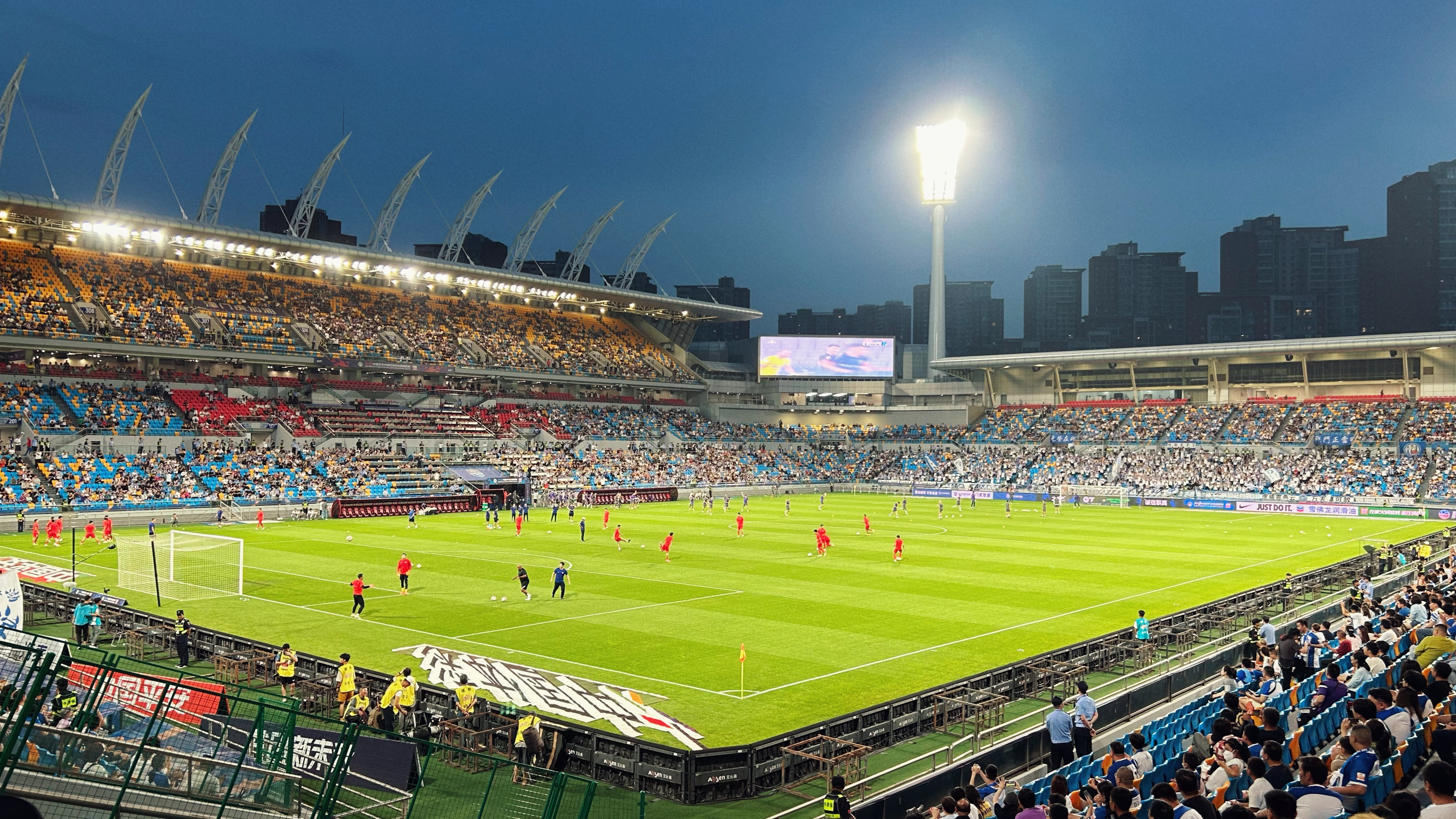
The TEDA Football Stadium before a football match in 2023.

Football in the People's Republic of China is administered by the Chinese Football Association. It does not include Hong Kong and Macau. Recently, the popularity of association football grew faster than the popularity of basketball. In 2018, 21% of Chinese people said that basketball is their favorite sport, compared to 17% for association football. The same figures were 22% and 21%, respectively, in 2022.

== History ==
=== Ancient ===
A version of football called "cuju" was already practiced more than 2300 years ago in the city of Linzi as a military sport that served to train the troops and check the physical condition of the soldiers, with "cu" meaning "to kick" and "ju" meaning "a type of leather ball". Cuju is regarded as an ancient Chinese ball game. It is a competitive game involving kicking the ball through a large opening and into a net. Similarly to modern-day American football, hands can be used when playing Cuju. This sport was quite popular in medieval China, and it was also more pervasive among the higher ranks and classes in ancient China. It was also played and enjoyed by the intellectuals, royalty, soldiers, and even the peasants. There were two forms of cuju. One served as a competition, in which teams played each other trying to score as many goals as possible with goals and keepers. The other type of exhibition was more for entertainment, which even had live music in the background and female players were allowed, with its main purpose was to demonstrate technique and dexterity.

The first recorded references to cuju in Chinese literature dates back to the Warring States Period (475-221 BC). Following this period came the rule of the Han dynasty from 202 BC to 220 AD. The Han dynasty brought wealth and cultural sophistication to China and allowed for cuju to flourish. However, after the falling out of the Han dynasty in 220 AD, cuju began to slowly decline in popularity. Despite its brief disappearance, the sport was revived during the Tang dynasty (618–907) where it was no longer restricted to nobility, but instead became a part of folk tradition and played at Chinese festivals. Cuju continued to cement itself in Chinese culture during the Song dynasty (960–1279) when China had reached new heights in economic, cultural and social development. There were many written records of Cuju and its influence in ancient China. A book called the Splendours of the Eastern Capital recorded the history of Cuju. Players of Cuju were usually men that came from wealthy families, some of whom played professionally. However, Cuju was not only limited to men, and other writers in the Tang Dynasty (618 to 907 AD) recorded stories of women playing alongside men. The sport was often played as entertainment for banquets and ceremonies, and even the Emperor Taizu of the Song Dynasty was seen in a painting playing Cuju. However, cuju again lost its importance during the Ming dynasty (1368–1644). The first Ming ruler even banned cuju altogether because it was believed to be a distraction from work and military training. After this disappearance, there never was another revival of cuju because western influences, like association football, officially got rid of cuju altogether.

=== Modern ===
Hong Kong athletes, including during its time as a British colony, played on Chinese national teams.

In the 1920s, China won five straight championships over Japan and the Philippines in the Far Eastern Championship Games.

In 2002, the men's national team qualified for the FIFA World Cup for the first time.

In 2015, China began implementing a plan to improve its national success in football.

== Association football ==
Association football in China
- Governing body: CFA
- National team: China

National competitions
- Chinese FA Cup; Chinese FA Super Cup; Chinese FA Women's Cup

Club competitions
- Chinese Super League; China League One; China League Two; CMCL; Member Football Association Leagues; Chinese Women's Super League; Chinese Women's Football League; Chinese Futsal League

International competitions
- AFC Champions League; AFC Cup; AFC Women's Club Championship; Asian Cup; AFC Women's Asian Cup; AFC Futsal Asian Cup; AFC Futsal Club Championship; FIFA Club World Cup; FIFA World Cup; FIFA Futsal World Cup

The Chinese Super League (CSL; Chinese: 中超联赛) is the highest tier of professional association football in Mainland China, operating under the auspices of the Chinese Football Association (CFA). The Super League was created by the re-branding of the former top division, Chinese Football Association Jia-A League, in 2004. While the league originally consisted of 12 teams, 16 teams now compete in it. The league has witnessed match-fixing, illegal betting, and violence on and off the pitch which the government of the People's Republic of China has promised to fix. Two former top executives of the Football Association of China were arrested and prosecuted for taking bribes. The Super League is criticized for overusing of foreign players in clubs, including some record-breaking transfers of foreign players. Racist sentiment against foreign players, including African ones, has been seen.

The sport is covered by the media. National competitions are generally televised on CCTV-5 and CCTV-5+. Guangdong Television reserves rights, however, for the Premier League and the UEFA Champions League. Since 1996, CCTV-5 has had weekly programmes televising live games in the Italian Serie A and German Bundesliga to Football Night (足球之夜). Serie A, Bundesliga and La Liga are broadcast on CCTV-5. Shanghai's Dongfang Sports channel also has coverage.

Initiatives have been developed, including Vision China, a part FIFA Vision Asia. The program covers marketing, development, training, sports medicine, competitions, media, and fans. It also includes assessments on association football in China, planning matches, and monitoring them. Goal Project for China, a part of FIFA Goal Project, invested in China to help build the new headquarters of CFA. The government has created at least 70,000 fields and 24,000 schools.

In that year, Beijing Guoan, Guangzhou Evergrande and Shandong Luneng Taishan were the only Chinese sports clubs with at least 5 million followers on Weibo.

Chinese football clubs are the most popular Chinese sports clubs on social media. The table shows the popularity of the Chinese clubs on Weibo as of 15 June 2015:

#	Football club	City	Followers
1	Guangzhou FC	Guangzhou	5.4 million
2	Shandong Taishan	Jinan	5.2 million
3	Beijing Guoan	Beijing	5 million
4	Tianjin Jinmen Tiger	Tianjin	4.9 million
5	Shanghai Shenhua	Shanghai	4.7 million

As of 2025, China has fewer than 100,000 registered players. In response to this situation, the Ministry of Education, in cooperation and coordination with the Chinese FA, announced the expansion of the Chinese Youth Football Elite League (est. 2014) in 2021, as well as the creation of the first-ever nationwide, school-based China Youth Football League in 2022, with the aim of promoting football in schools and universities and cultivating talents from the school tables. The ministry also made physical education (PE) mandatory across China in early 2025, effectively making football a core part of the curriculum.

== Competition system ==
The Chinese Super League is carried out in a double-round way of home and away games. There are 34 rounds in the whole season. The Chinese Super League implements the "up 3 down 3" policy, that is, the 16th, 17th and 18th places in the Chinese Super League are directly relegated to the A League. The 1st, 2nd, and 3rd places in the A League are directly promoted to the Chinese Super League.

=== Points rule ===
Each team has 3 points for a win, 1 point for a draw, and 0 points for a loss.

After all the competitions of the Chinese Super League in the current year are completed, the team with the most points will rank first. If two or more teams have an equal number of points, they will be ranked in the following order:

1. Teams with equal points and more points in each other's competitions will be ranked first;

2. Teams with equal points and more goal difference in each other's games will be ranked first;

3. The team with the same score and the highest number of goals in each other's games will be ranked first;

4. The reserve team of the club to which it belongs is ranked first in the reserve team league this season, and it ranks first;

5. Teams with equal points that have the most goal difference in all competitions of the Chinese Super League in that year will rank first;

6. The team with equal points that scored the most goals in all the competitions of the Chinese Super League in that year will be ranked first;

7. The player with the highest fair play points is in the front (red and yellow cards will be deducted, 1 point will be deducted for each yellow card, and 3 points will be deducted for each red card);

8. Ranking will be determined by drawing lots.

== Youth football ==
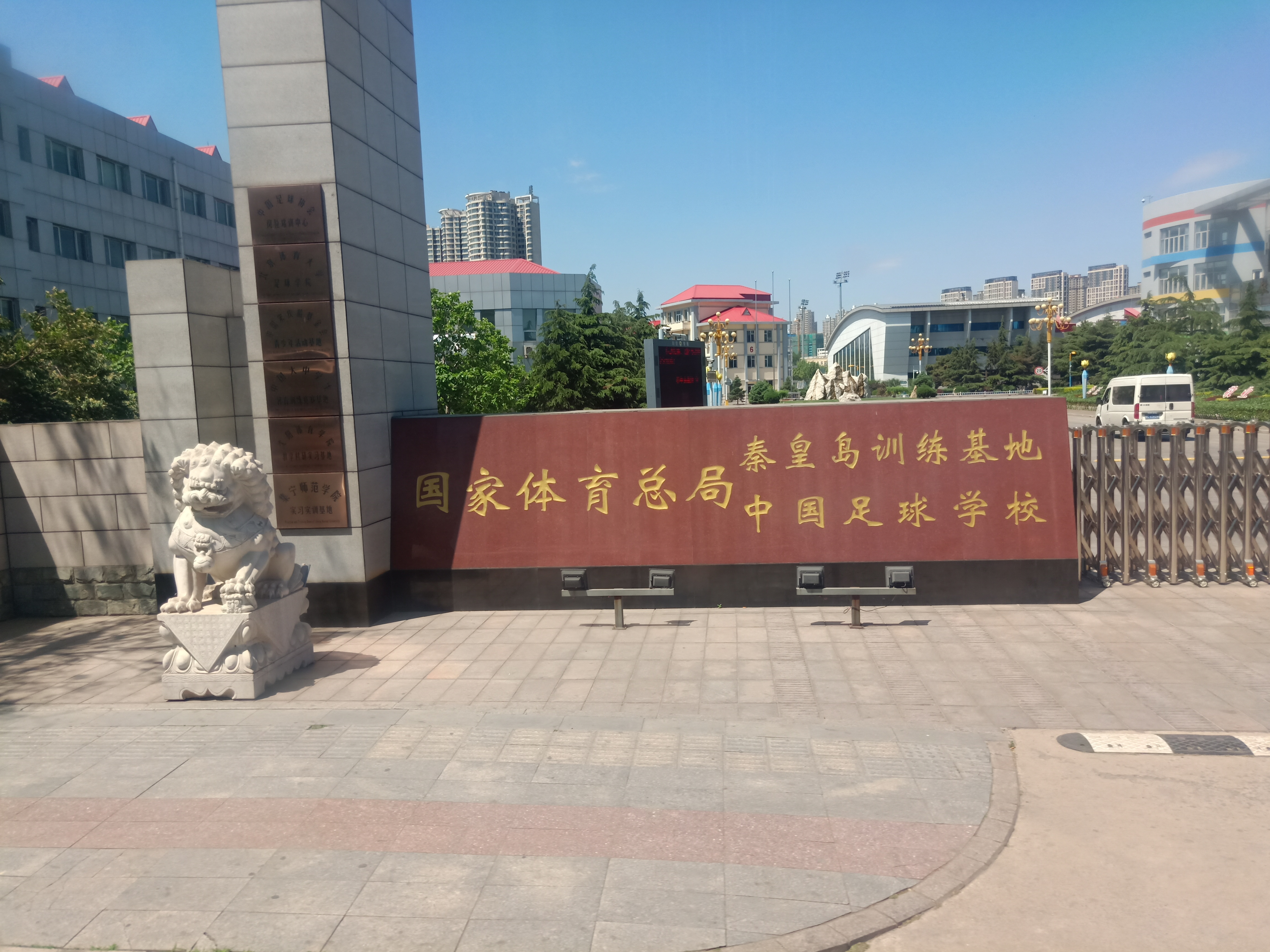
A football school in Qinhuangdao.

There are three main pathways for Chinese youth to play football:

- The school-based system, which is itself divided by age into primary school, middle school, and high school
- The "National Youth Football Training Centre" (led by the CFA), which supports 12 men's and 14 women's youth training centers as of 2020
- The professional football club system

== Most popular clubs ==
Spanish La Liga club Barcelona is the most popular football club on the Chinese internet, being the most followed football club on Douyin (the Chinese version of TikTok) and the most followed Spanish football club on Weibo.

=== Polling ===
Most supported European football clubs in China (Statista, 2019)
Club	Fans
(Italy) AC Milan	106 million
(Germany) Bayern Munich	90 million
(Italy) Inter Milan	106 million
(England) Manchester United	107 million
(Spain) Real Madrid	127 million

== Largest football stadiums by capacity in China ==
Stadium	Capacity	City	Province	Tenants
Guangdong Olympic Stadium	80,012	Guangzhou	Guangdong	2001 National Games of China, 2009 Asian Athletics Championships, 2010 Asian Games
Beijing National Stadium	80,000	Beijing	Beijing	2008 Summer Olympics, 2015 World Championships in Athletics, 2022 Winter Olympics
Hangzhou Sports Park	80,000	Hangzhou	Zhejiang	2022 Asian Games
Shanghai Stadium	72,000	Shanghai	Shanghai	Shanghai Shenhua, 1999 National Games of China, 2007 Special Olympics World Summer Games, Football at the 2008 Summer Olympics
Workers' Stadium	68,000	Beijing	Beijing	Beijing Guoan, Former venue for the 2023 AFC Asian Cup (Note: Originally, the tournament was to be held in China, with the Beijing venue being the Workers Stadium. But on 14 May 2022, owing to COVID-19 in China and China's Zero-COVID policy, China had to withdraw from being the host and gave the host to Qatar on 17 October.)
Dalian Barracuda Bay Football Stadium	63,000	Dalian	Liaoning	Dalian Yingbo, Former venue for the 2023 AFC Asian Cup
Shanxi Sports Centre Stadium	62,000	Taiyuan	Shanxi	
Nanjing Olympic Sports Centre Stadium	61,443	Nanjing	Jiangsu	2005 National Games of China, 2014 Summer Youth Olympic Games
Dalian Sports Centre Stadium	61,000	Dalian	Liaoning	
Shenzhen Universiade Sports Centre Stadium	60,334	Shenzhen	Guangdong	2011 Summer Universiade
Xiamen Egret Stadium	60,592	Xiamen	Fujian	Former venue for the 2023 AFC Asian Cup
Guangxi Sports Centre Stadium	60,000	Nanning	Guangxi	Guangxi Hengchen
Haixia Olympic Centre Stadium	60,000	Fuzhou	Fujian	
Hefei Olympic Sports Centre Stadium	60,000	Hefei	Anhui	
Longxing Football Stadium	60,000	Chongqing	Chongqing	Former venue for the 2023 AFC Asian Cup
Ordos Sports Centre Stadium	60,000	Ordos	Inner Mongolia	
Shenyang Olympic Sports Centre Stadium	60,000	Shenyang	Liaoning	Football at the 2008 Summer Olympics, 2013 National Games of China
Lanzhou Olympic Center Stadium	60,000	Lanzhou	Gansu	
Xi'an Olympic Sports Centre Stadium	60,000	Xi'an	Shaanxi	
Zhengzhou Olympic Sports Centre Stadium	60,000	Zhengzhou	Henan	

== Attendances ==
The average attendance per top-flight football league season and the club with the highest average attendance:

Season	League average	Best club	Best club average
2024	19,431	Beijing	46,444
2023	19,866	Beijing	43,769
2022	—	—	—
2021	—	—	—
2020	—	—	—
2019	23,341	Guangzhou	45,795
2018	24,107	Guangzhou	47,002
2017	23,766	Guangzhou	45,587
2016	24,159	Guangzhou	44,883
2015	22,193	Guangzhou	45,889
2014	18,986	Guangzhou	42,154
2013	18,571	Guangzhou	40,428
2012	18,740	Guangzhou	37,250
2011	17,651	Guangzhou	45,666
2010	14,581	Beijing	33,342
2009	16,059	Beijing	36,805
2008	13,444	Shandong	26,501
2007	15,112	Shaanxi	24,643
2006	10,611	Shandong	30,679
2005	10,284	Shandong	26,000
2004	10,838	Shandong	23,636

Sources: League pages on Wikipedia

== See also ==
- List of football stadiums in China
