= Chen Chengda =

Chinese footballer and manager (1929–2022)

Chen Chengda 陈成达
Personal information
- Date of birth: 15 October 1929
- Place of birth: Shanghai, China
- Date of death: 24 March 2022 (aged 92)
- Place of death: Beijing, China
- Height: 1.72 m (5 ft 8 in)
- Position: Midfielder

Youth career
- Lianxing
- Jingwu

Senior career*
Years	Team	Apps	(Gls)
- Shanghai Student Union
1950–1951	Shanghai		
- East China

International career
- China U20
- China

Managerial career
- 1958–1962: China
- 1971–1973: Hebei
- 1974: China U20
- * Club domestic league appearances and goals

Chen Chengda (simplified Chinese: 陈成达; traditional Chinese: 陳成達; pinyin: Chén Chéngdá; 15 October 1929 – 24 March 2022) was a Chinese football player and manager.

== Club career ==
Born in Shanghai, Chen played youth football in the city for Lianxing and Jingwu. Whilst studying at St. John's University, Shanghai, he played for Shanghai Student Union. In 1950, he joined Shanghai, later joining East China in 1951.

== International career ==
After representing China at under-20 level, Chen represented the senior team in the 1950s. After leaving St. John's University in order to pursue his football career, he played in a number of friendlies for China in preparation for the 1952 Olympics.

== Managerial career ==
Following his retirement, Chen was appointed manager of China in 1958, staying manager until 1962. In 1971, he was appointed manager of the Hebei team, remaining in his post for two years. In 1974, he managed China's under-20's.

Following his managerial career, Chen took up roles at the Chinese Football Association, FIFA and the Asian Football Confederation. He later acted as a consultant to China women's national football team, helping the team to finish runners-up at the 1996 Olympics and the 1999 Women's World Cup.
