= Song Kai (politician) =

Chinese politician

- 宋凯
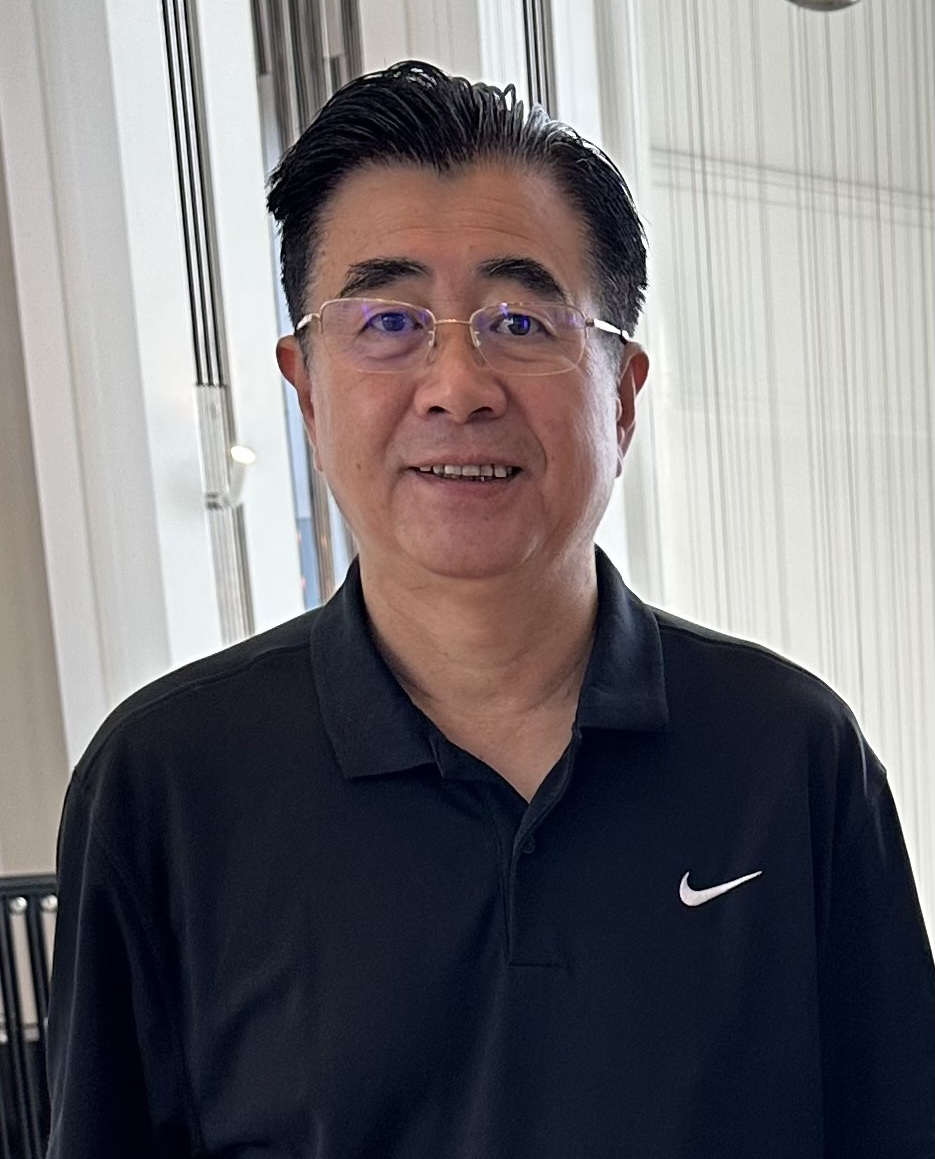
- Song in June 2025

President of the Chinese Football Association
- Incumbent
- Assumed office 16 October 2023
- Deputy: Sun Wen and 4 others
- Preceded by: Chen Xuyuan

Personal details
- Born: 26 January 1965 (age 61) China
- Party: Chinese Communist Party
- Education: Beijing Sport University; Lee Kuan Yew School of Public Policy

Chinese name
- Simplified Chinese: 宋凯
- Traditional Chinese: 宋凱
Transcriptions
Standard Mandarin
- Hanyu Pinyin: Sòng Kǎi

Song Kai (Chinese: 宋凯; born 26 January 1965) is a Chinese politician, football executive, and former university lecturer currently serving as deputy Party Secretary and president of the Chinese Football Association and director of the Liaoning Provincial Sports Bureau.

== Early life and education ==
Born on 26 January 1965, Song graduated from Beijing Sport University. In 2006, he also studied at Lee Kuan Yew School of Public Policy, where he majored in public administration.

== Career ==
Song taught at Liaoning University beginning in August 1988 before being appointed deputy director of the Shenyang Sports Commission in September 1998. In January 2000, he became deputy director of the Liaoning Provincial Sports Bureau, rising to director in February 2016.

On 16 October 2023, he was chosen as deputy Party Secretary and president of the Chinese Football Association, succeeding Chen Xuyuan, who was under probe for taking bribes.

Sporting positions
Preceded by Chen Xuyuan	President of the Chinese Football Association; 2023–present	Incumbent
