= Du Zhaocai =

Chinese football administrator

- 杜兆才
- Born: 1 March 1960 (age 66); China
- Occupation: Sports administrator
- Political party: Chinese Communist Party

Member of the FIFA Council
- In office 2019–2023

President, East Asian Football Federation
- In office 2022–2023
- Preceded by: Chung Mong-gyu

First Vice President Chinese Football Association
- In office 2019–2023

Du Zhaocai (Chinese: 杜兆才; born 1 March 1960) is a Chinese football administrator who served as the Chinese Communist Party Committee Secretary of the Chinese Football Association, and a member of the FIFA Council since his election on 7 April 2019.

== Career ==
He previously served as vice president of the Asian Football Confederation (AFC) and as deputy minister at General Administration of Sport of China since October 2018. He had also served as the vice president of the Chinese Olympic Committee, as a council member of the International Association of Athletics Federations, and has over 30 years of experience as a sports administrator.

In April 2022, Du was elected as the president of the East Asian Football Federation for a four-year term.

== Downfall ==
On April 1, 2023, Du was named in a Chinese football anti-corruption probe "suspected of violations of discipline and law". In August 2024, he pleaded guilty to accepting more than US$6.1 million in bribes.

On December 13, 2024, he was sentenced to 14 years in prison for bribery and fined 4 million yuan ($550,000) by the Wuhan Intermediate People's Court in Hubei province.
