= Fang Renqiu =

Chinese footballer and coach (1929–2019)

Fang Renqiu (Chinese: 方纫秋; 11 September 1929 – 6 February 2019) was a Chinese football player and coach. In the 1950s, he was a member of the first national team of the People's Republic of China, and was named one of the ten most popular football players in the country. He served as the sixth head coach of the China national team in 1964, and later as head coach of the Shanghai football team which won the gold medal in the 1983 National Games of China.

== Biography ==
Fang was born on 11 September 1929 in Shanghai, Republic of China. After graduating from Jinyuan High School, he joined Shanghai Jingwu Football Club in 1948. He played as a left winger.

In 1952, he was selected to become a member of the China National Sports Association Football Team, which was the first national football team of the newly established People's Republic of China. From 1954, he studied and trained in Hungary for a year and half.

In 1957, Fang was a member of the China national team that played in the 1958 FIFA World Cup qualification rounds. The team failed to qualify after narrowly losing to Indonesia, but Fang was named as one of the ten most popular football players of China.

In 1964, Fang succeeded Nian Weisi as the sixth head coach of the national football team, but was soon dismissed after the team lost a friendly match. From 1972 to 1978, he was the head coach of the Shanghai municipal football team. After a stint in Burundi, he again served as head coach of the Shanghai team from 1981 to 1984, and led the team to win the gold medal in the 1983 National Games of China. He retired from football afterwards.

== Personal life ==
Fang was married to Zhang Bei (张倍). He died on 6 February 2019 in Shanghai, at the age of 89.
