= Zhang Jian (football administrator) =

- Born: 1965 or 1966 (age 59–60); China
- Occupation: football administrator
- Title: Member, FIFA Council
- Term: 2017-

Zhang Jian (born 1965/66) is a Chinese football administrator and a member of the FIFA Council since 2017.

He is the Chinese Football Association executive vice chairman and secretary general.

In May 2017, he was elected to the FIFA Council, and will serve until 2019.
