= Klaus Schlappner =

German football manager

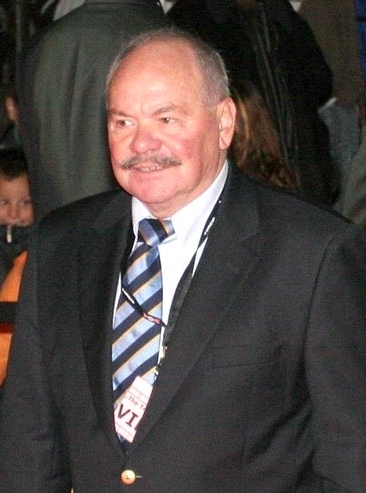
- Schlappner in 2006

Personal information
- Date of birth: 22 May 1940 (age 86)
- Place of birth: Lampertheim, Hesse, Germany

Senior career*
Years	Team	Apps	(Gls)
- Olympic Lampertheim
- VfB Lampertheim
- FV Biblis
- VfR Bürstadt
- VfR Ludwigshafen
- Südwest Ludwigshafen

Managerial career
- 1977–1980: Darmstadt 98 (assistant coach)
- 1980–1987: Waldhof Mannheim
- 1987–1988: Darmstadt 98
- 1989–1990: 1. FC Saarbrücken
- 1991–1992: Carl Zeiss Jena
- 1992–1993: China PR
- 1995–1996: Waldhof Mannheim
- 1996–1997: Chongqing Lifan
- 2000–2001: Paykan
Medal record
Men's football
Representing China (as manager)
AFC Asian Cup
Bronze medal – third place	1992
- * Club domestic league appearances and goals

Klaus Schlappner (born 22 May 1940) is a German football manager. He is predominantly remembered for his first spell with SV Waldhof Mannheim, when he led them to the 2. Bundesliga title and several seasons in the Bundesliga as well as being the first foreign coach to manage the China national team.

== Early career ==
Born in Lampertheim, Hesse, Schlappner's early career in football was not particularly eventful. He played for his local football team in Lampertheim in his youth and only progressed up to amateur football or lower league regional football. He moved instead into coaching before he retired playing and achieved the necessary coaching certificates in 1976 before carrying on with his studies in Cologne to achieve a certificate in teaching football management.

== Managerial career ==
Schlappner's career as a manager rose to prominence when he was able to lead SV Waldhof Mannheim to win the 2. Bundesliga in the 1982–83 league season. During his time with them, he helped establish them within the Bundesliga for the next several seasons and oversaw them through some of their most successful periods in the club's history until he left in 1987. He rejoined his former club SV Darmstadt 98 in the second tier to help them fight for promotion during the 1987–88 league season where they narrowly missed out on a position to the Bundesliga by losing a play-off position. The following seasons saw other second-tier clubs 1. FC Saarbrücken and FC Carl Zeiss Jena call for his services in their push for promotion, however, Schlappner was unable to achieve this with either team.

In 1992, he led the China national team to the semi-finals of the 1992 AFC Asian Cup, but he was dismissed after the team failed to qualify for the 1994 FIFA World Cup qualification. He would nevertheless stay within China as a technical adviser for the football federation until he returned to Germany to manage SV Waldhof Mannheim again in 1996 to help them for their promotion bid to return to the Bundesliga, however his return was disappointing and he left before the season ended. He moved away from senior management but returned to Asia to help Iran to establish the newly re-branded Iran Pro League during 2000 as well as acting as an adviser for the Mongolian Football Federation in 2006.

== Honours ==
Waldhof Mannheim

- 2. Bundesliga: 1982–83
