= Chinese referees in FIFA competitions =

This article is about Chinese referees in FIFA competitions, sorted by competition.

== Men's ==
=== FIFA World Cup ===
Year	Hosts	Referees	Age	Association	FIFA int'l age	Statistics				Rounds
Year	Hosts	Referees	Age	Association	FIFA int'l age	Mat.	YC	RC	PK	Rounds
2002	Japan; South Korea	Lu Jun	43	Beijing	12	2	5	1	1	Group stage

=== Men's Olympic Football Tournament (U-23) ===
Year	Hosts	Referees	Age	Association	FIFA int'l age	Statistics				Rounds
Year	Hosts	Referees	Age	Association	FIFA int'l age	Mat.	YC	RC	PK	Rounds
2000	Australia	Lu Jun	41	Beijing	10	2	8	2	0	Group stage

=== FIFA World Youth Championship ===
Year	Hosts	Referees	Age	Association	FIFA int'l age	Statistics				Rounds
Year	Hosts	Referees	Age	Association	FIFA int'l age	Mat.	YC	RC	PK	Rounds
1983	Mexico	Zhang Daqiao	45	Tianjin	5	1	1	0	0	Group stage
1989	Saudi Arabia	Chen Shengcai		Yunnan	11	1	2	0	0	Group stage
1991	Portugal	Wei Jihong	37	Shandong	3	1	2	0	0	Group stage
1999	Nigeria	Lu Jun	40	Beijing	9	5	7	0	0	Group stage; Round of 16; Semi-finals
2001	Argentina	Sun Baojie	36	Beijing	5	1	0	0	0	Group stage
2019	Poland	Fu Ming	36	Beijing	7	Video Assistant Referee				

=== FIFA U-16 World Championship / FIFA U-17 World Cup ===
Year	Hosts	Referees	Age	Association	FIFA int'l age	Statistics				Rounds
Year	Hosts	Referees	Age	Association	FIFA int'l age	Mat.	YC	RC	PK	Rounds
1985	China	Cui Baoyin	46	Beijing	7	2	6	0	0	Group stage; Semi-finals
1985	China	Chen Shengcai		Yunnan	7	1	3	0	0	Group stage
1985	China	Zhang Daqiao	47	Tianjin	7	1	0	0	0	Group stage
1997	Egypt	Lu Jun	38	Beijing	7	2	3	0	0	Group stage; Quarter-finals
2019	Brazil	Ma Ning	40	Jiangsu	9	2	6	0	0	Group stage

=== Youth Olympic Football Tournament (U-15) ===
Year	Hosts	Referees	Age	Association	FIFA int'l age	Statistics				Rounds
Year	Hosts	Referees	Age	Association	FIFA int'l age	Mat.	YC	RC	PK	Rounds
2014	China	Fu Ming	31	Nanjing	2	2	5	0	3	Group stage; Bronze medal match

=== FIFA Confederations Cup (defunct) ===
Year	Hosts	Referees	Age	Association	FIFA int'l age	Statistics				Rounds
Year	Hosts	Referees	Age	Association	FIFA int'l age	Mat.	YC	RC	PK	Rounds
2001	Japan; South Korea	Lu Jun	42	Beijing	11	1	2	0	0	Group stage

== Women's ==
=== FIFA Women's World Cup ===
Year	Hosts	Referees	Age	Association	FIFA int'l age	Statistics				Rounds
Year	Hosts	Referees	Age	Association	FIFA int'l age	Mat.	YC	RC	PK	Rounds
1991	China	Lu Jun (male)	32	Beijing	1	2	3	0	1	Group stage
1999	United States	Zuo Xiudi	37	Shanghai	5	2	3	0	0	Group stage
2003	United States	Zhang Dongqing	32	Dalian	7	3	11	0	1	Group stage; Quarter-finals
2007	China	Niu Huijun	38	Qingdao	4	2	1	0	0	Group stage
2015	Canada	Qin Liang	36	Beijing	6	1	2	0	0	Group stage
2019	France	Qin Liang	40	Beijing	10	2	5	0	0	Group stage; Round of 16

=== Women's Olympic Football Tournament ===
Year	Hosts	Referees	Age	Association	FIFA int'l age	Statistics				Rounds
Year	Hosts	Referees	Age	Association	FIFA int'l age	Mat.	YC	RC	PK	Rounds
2008	China	Niu Huijun	39	Qingdao	5	1	5	0	0	Group stage

=== FIFA U-19 Women's World Championship / FIFA U-20 Women's World Cup ===
Year	Hosts	Referees	Age	Association	FIFA int'l age	Statistics				Rounds
Year	Hosts	Referees	Age	Association	FIFA int'l age	Mat.	YC	RC	PK	Rounds
2012	Japan	Qin Liang	33	Beijing	3	2	2	0	0	Group stage
2014	Canada	Qin Liang	35	Beijing	5	2	2	0	2	Group stage
2016	Papua New Guinea	Qin Liang	37	Beijing	7	3	3	0	0	Group stage; Third place match
2018	France	Qin Liang	39	Beijing	9	2	8	0	0	Group stage; Quarter-finals

=== FIFA U-17 Women's World Cup ===
Year	Hosts	Referees	Age	Association	FIFA int'l age	Statistics				Rounds
Year	Hosts	Referees	Age	Association	FIFA int'l age	Mat.	YC	RC	PK	Rounds
2008	New Zealand	Wang Jia	27	Shanghai	2	1	2	0	0	Group stage
2010	Trinidad and Tobago	Wang Jia	29	Shanghai	4	1	3	0	0	Group stage

=== Girls' Youth Olympic Football Tournament (U-15) ===
Year	Hosts	Referees	Age	Association	FIFA int'l age	Statistics				Rounds
Year	Hosts	Referees	Age	Association	FIFA int'l age	Mat.	YC	RC	PK	Rounds
2014	China	He Jin		Guangzhou	2	2	2	0	1	Group stage; Fifth place match
