= China national football team =

Men's association football team

China PR
- Nickname(s): 龙之队, Lóng zhī duì (Dragon Team)
- Association: Chinese Football Association (CFA)
- Confederation: AFC (Asia)
- Sub-confederation: EAFF (East Asia)
- Head coach: Shao Jiayi
- Captain: Zhang Yuning
- Most caps: Li Weifeng (112)
- Top scorer: Hao Haidong (39)
- Home stadium: Various
- FIFA code: CHN
First colours	Second colours

FIFA ranking
- Current: 95 ▲1 (18 November 2026)
- Highest: 37 (December 1998)
- Lowest: 109 (March 2013)

First international
- As Republic of China (1912–1949); Philippines 2–1 China (Manila, Philippines; 1 February 1913); As People's Republic of China (1949–present); Finland 4–0 China (Helsinki, Finland; 4 August 1952)

Biggest win
- China 19–0 Guam (Ho Chi Minh City, Vietnam; 26 January 2000)

Biggest defeat
- Brazil 8–0 China (Recife, Brazil; 10 September 2012)

World Cup
- Appearances: 1 (first in 2002)
- Best result: Group stage (2002)

Asian Cup
- Appearances: 14 (first in 1976)
- Best result: Runners-up (1984, 2004)

EAFF E-1 Football Championship
- Appearances: 9 (first in 2003)
- Best result: Champions (2005, 2010)

The China national football team (simplified Chinese: 中国国家足球队; traditional Chinese: 中國國家足球隊; pinyin: Zhōngguó guójiā zúqiú duì), recognised as China PR by FIFA, represents China in men's international association football and is governed by the Chinese Football Association (CFA).

China won the EAFF East Asian Cup in 2005 and 2010, was runner-up at the AFC Asian Cup in 1984 and 2004, and made its sole FIFA World Cup appearance in 2002, losing all matches without scoring a goal.

== History ==
=== As Republic of China (1913–1949) ===
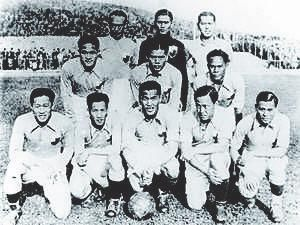
Chinese Olympic football team in Berlin, 1936

China's first-ever international representative match was arranged by Elwood Brown, president of the Philippine Athletic Association, who proposed the creation of the Far Eastern Championship Games, a multi-sport event considered to be a precursor to the Asian Games. He invited China (Republic of China) to participate in the inaugural 1913 Far Eastern Championship Games held in the Philippines, which included association football within the schedule. To represent them, it was decided that the winner of the football at the Chinese National Games in 1910 should have the honour to represent the country, where it was won by South China Football Club. The club's founder and coach Mok Hing (Chinese: 莫慶) would become China's first coach and on 4 February 1913 in a one-off tournament game held in the Manila he led China to a 2–1 defeat against the Philippines national football team. With the team captain, Tong Fuk Cheung (Chinese: 唐福祥) scoring the only goal and the first international goal for China.

The political unrest of the Xinhai Revolution that mired China's participation in the first tournament, especially in renaming the team as Republic of China national football team, did not stop Shanghai being awarded the 1915 Far Eastern Championship Games. Once again South China Football Club, now known as South China Athletic Association won the right to represent the nation. This time in a two legged play-off against the Philippines, China won the first game 1–0 and then drew the second 0–0 to win their first ever tournament. With the games being the first and only regional football tournament for national teams outside Britain, China looked to establish themselves as a regional powerhouse by winning a total of nine championships.

The Chinese Football Association was founded in 1924 and then was first affiliated with FIFA in 1931. With these foundations in place China looked to establish themselves within the international arena and along with Japan were the first Asian sides to participate in the Football at the Summer Olympics when they competed within the 1936 Summer Olympics held in Germany. At the tournament China were knocked out within their first game at the round of 16 when they were beaten by Great Britain Olympic football team 2–0 on 6 August 1936.

On 7 July 1937 the Second Sino-Japanese War officially erupted, which saw the relations between China and Japan completely eroded especially once it was announced that Japan would hold the 1938 Far Eastern Championship Games. The tournament would be officially cancelled while Japan held their own tournament called the 2600th Anniversary Celebrations of the Japanese Empire, which included the Japanese puppet states Manchukuo and the collaborationist National Reorganised Government of China based in occupied Nanjing. But none of the top Chinese players competed in the Japanese Empire anniversary games. None of the games during the Second Sino-Japanese War are officially recognized and once the war ended on 9 September 1945 China looked to the Olympics once again for international recognition. On 2 August 1948 China competed in the Football at the 1948 Summer Olympics where they were once again knocked out in the last sixteen, this time by Turkey national football team in a 4–0 defeat. When the players returned they found the country in the midst of the Chinese Civil War. When it ended, the team had been split into two, one called the People's Republic of China national football team and the other called Republic of China national football team (later renamed Chinese Taipei national football team).

=== Early People's Republic (1950–1979) ===
The newly instated People's Republic of China reformed CFA before having FIFA acknowledge their 1931 membership on 14 June 1952. Finland, who were one of the first nations to hold diplomatic relations with China's new government, invited the country to take part in the 1952 Summer Olympics. Li Fenglou would become the country's first permanent manager to lead them in the tournament, however the Chinese delegation was delayed and they missed the entire competition, nevertheless the Finland national football team would still greet Li and the Chinese team with a friendly game on 4 August 1952 making it People's Republic of China's official first game, which ended in a 4–0 defeat. In preparation for entering their first FIFA competition, China sent a young squad to train in Hungary in 1954. However, when they entered the 1958 FIFA World Cup qualification process China were knocked out by Indonesia.

On 7 June 1958, China stopped participating within any FIFA recognised football events when FIFA officially started to recognise the Republic of China as a different country. This sparked a diplomatic argument that had already seen China withdraw from the 1956 Summer Olympics for the same reasons. For years the People's Republic of China would only play in friendlies with nations who recognized them as the sole heir to the China name. On 25 October 1971 the United Nations would recognise the People's Republic country as the sole heir to the China name in their General Assembly Resolution 2758 act. Due to this hearing in 1973, the Nationalist Chinese team, which had been using the name "Republic of China", would stop using that name and would eventually rename themselves as "Chinese Taipei" in 1980. These acts would see China rejoin the international sporting community, first by becoming a member of the Asian Football Confederation in 1974 and by rejoining FIFA again in 1979.

=== Asian underdogs (1980–2008) ===
The 1974 Asian Games reintroduced the team back into international football while the 1976 AFC Asian Cup saw them came third.

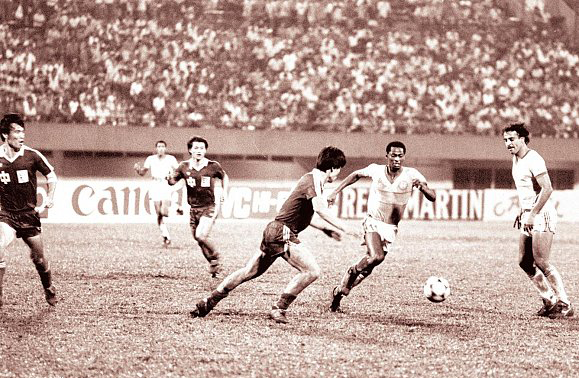
Chinese players in a match against Saudi Arabia at the 1984 AFC Asian Cup

In 1980, China participated in the 1982 FIFA World Cup qualifiers for a berth in the 1982 World Cup, but they lost a play-off game against New Zealand. During the 1986 FIFA World Cup qualifiers for the 1986 World Cup, China faced Hong Kong at home in the final match of the first qualifying round on 19 May 1985 where China only needed a draw to advance. However, Hong Kong produced a 2–1 upset win which resulted in riots inside and outside the stadium in Beijing. During the 1990 FIFA World Cup qualifiers, China again reached the final round. They just missed out on qualifying as they conceded two goals in the final three minutes against Qatar in their final group match. During the 1994 FIFA World Cup qualifiers – when they were led by their first-ever foreign manager, Klaus Schlapner – China failed to reach the final round of qualifying, coming second behind Iraq.

In 1987, the first Chinese footballers moved abroad when future national team player Xie Yuxin joined FC Zwolle (Netherlands) and ex-national teamer Gu Guangming joined SV Darmstadt 98 (Germany). In 1988, national team captain Jia Xiuquan and striker Liu Haiguang both joined FK Partizan (Yugoslavia).

After failing to reach the 1998 FIFA World Cup, China appointed Serbian manager Bora Milutinović as coach of the national team, and China saw its fortune increased. The country managed to take fourth-place finish in the 2000 AFC Asian Cup where the Chinese side performed well, and only fell to heavyweights Japan and South Korea by one goal margin. The good performance in Lebanon boosted the confidence of Chinese side, and in 2002 FIFA World Cup qualifiers, China lost only one and drew only one, winning all the remaining games, most notably an important 1–0 win over Oman, to finally reach the 2002 FIFA World Cup, its first and only World Cup up to date. In the 2002 World Cup, China was eliminated after three matches without gaining a single point nor even scoring a goal during their participation in the tournament.

China hosted the 2004 AFC Asian Cup, ultimately fell 1–3 to Japan in a final match. The match's outcome sparked anger among Chinese supporters, who rioted in response to bad refereeing. There were an estimated 250 million viewers for the match, the largest single-event sports audience in the country's history at that time.

After winning the 2005 East Asian Football Championship following a 2–0 win against North Korea, they started qualification for the 2007 AFC Asian Cup. During this time, the team became the subject of immense criticism and national embarrassment in the media when they had managed to score only one goal, Shao Jiayi's penalty kick during injury time, against Singapore at home and only managed a draw with Singapore in the away game. During preparations for the 2007 AFC Asian Cup, the team spent the weeks leading up to the tournament on a tour of the United States. While the 4–1 loss to the United States was unexpected, a 1–0 loss to Major League Soccer side Real Salt Lake which finished bottom of the league in the 2007 season caused serious concern.

During the 2007 AFC Asian Cup, the team played three group matches, winning against Malaysia, drawing with Iran after leading 2–1, and losing 3–0 to Uzbekistan. After high expectations, China's performance at the tournament drew criticism online which condemned the team's members and even the association. Zhu was later replaced as manager by Vladimir Petrović after these performances. Some commented that China's reliance on foreign managers for the past decade had been an indicator of its poor domestic manager development.

In June 2008, China failed to qualify for the 2010 FIFA World Cup, losing against Qatar and Iraq at home. After the 2008 Summer Olympics, Petrović was sacked as the manager and Yin Tiesheng was announced as the team's caretaker.

=== Stagnation (2009–present) ===
In April 2009, China appointed Gao Hongbo as the new manager, replacing Yin Tiesheng. His arrival saw China opt for a new strategy, turning towards ground passing tactics and adopting the 4–2–3–1 formation. It was noted that Chinese footballers had relied too heavily on the long ball tactic for almost a decade. Wei Di, the chief of the Chinese Football Association, stressed that, "Anytime, no matter win or loss, they must show their team spirit and courage. I hope, after one year's effort, the national team can give the public a new image." Gao was knocked out of the 2011 AFC Asian Cup's group stage. His winning percentage (65%), the highest for a Chinese manager since Nian Weisi (67.86%), did not defer the Chinese Football Association from replacing him with José Antonio Camacho in August 2011, less than a month before the qualification process for the 2014 FIFA World Cup.

==== Appointment of José Antonio Camacho ====
On 13 August 2011, José Antonio Camacho was appointed as the new manager of the team, signing a three-year deal for a reported annual salary of $8 million. Wei Di, CFA chief, explained the decision as being part of a long-term plan to help the country catch up with rivals Japan and South Korea. He noted that, "Compared with their neighbours Japan and South Korea, Chinese football is lagging far behind, we need to work with a long-term view and start to catch up with a pragmatic approach. The citizens expects heavily for China to qualify for the 2014 FIFA World Cup held in Brazil. They are afraid that changing the coach at the last moment may cause bad effect to the team's qualifying prospect. I can totally understand that. But we do not have any time to waste."

Yu Hongchen, the vice-president of the Chinese Football Administrative Centre, also stated, "The qualifying stage of 2014 World Cup is just a temporary task for him. Even if the task is failed, Camacho will not lose the job. When we started to find a new coach for the national team, we mainly focus on European countries such as Germany, the Netherlands and Spain. First of all, they have advanced football concepts, and secondly they have a productive youth training system, which we can learn from. We hope he can help us to find a suitable style."

Camacho managed the team to an 8–0 lost against Brazil in a friendly match on 10 September 2012 which would go on record as China's biggest ever international defeat. This massive loss also succumbed China to their worst ever FIFA ranking (109th).

Camacho then led China during their qualification process for the 2015 AFC Asian Cup whereby losing the first group match 2–1 to Saudi Arabia. After a 5–1 lost against Thailand in a friendly match, Camacho was sacked a week later and with Fu Bo assigned as the caretaker. In light of continued struggles, in 2015, General Secretary of the Chinese Communist Party Xi Jinping expressed the goal of having China's men's national team be the top team in Asia by 2030 and the following year China revealed its ambitious blueprint to be the best in the world by 2050.

==== Alain Perrin and Gao Hongbo returns ====
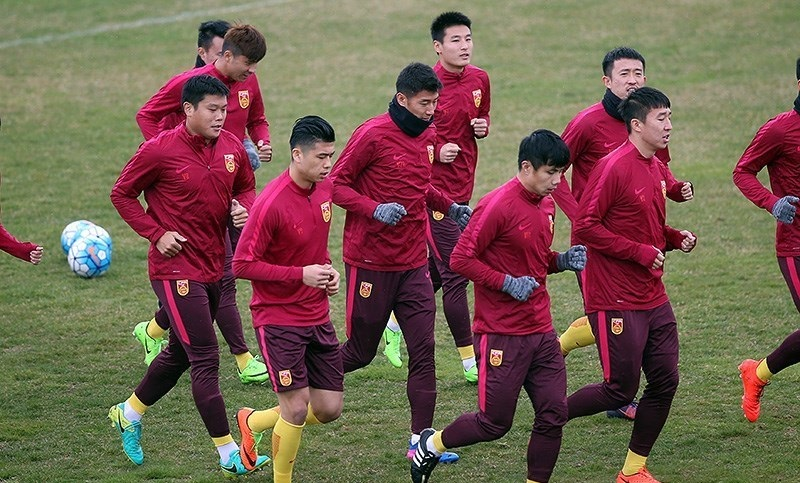
The Chinese national team in Tehran before a 2018 FIFA World Cup qualification match against Iran

After Camacho, there was Alain Perrin, who finally led China to qualify for the 2015 AFC Asian Cup, which also included luck from the Thailand–Lebanon encounter, in which Thailand lost but salvaged an important goal by Adisak Kraisorn to help improve China's goal difference with the Lebanese. Soon after that, Perrin led China into a series of friendlies, where some positive results against Macedonia, Kuwait, Paraguay and Thailand boosted some optimism.

In the 2015 AFC Asian Cup, Perrin's China was placed in a group with Saudi Arabia, Uzbekistan and North Korea. China emerged victoriously in all three games and qualified for the knockout stage for the first time since 2004. The Chinese Dragons then lost 2–0 to Australia.

Despite this, China's 2018 FIFA World Cup qualifiers immediately represented a huge problem for the Chinese side; they were held goalless by Hong Kong at home twice, and lost to Qatar. Perrin was sacked for the team's poor performance in the middle of the second round following another goalless draw with Hong Kong, and former coach Gao Hongbo returned to the role on 3 February 2016. Hongbo faced the task of guiding China at the expense of North Korea which had a better second-place ranking than China. His first two matches saw wins against the Maldives and Qatar, and with North Korea slipping up against the Philippines. These results secured the team's passage to the 2019 AFC Asian Cup and also the final qualifying stage for the World Cup for the first time since 2002.

China continued their World Cup hunt but suffered a 3–2 defeat to South Korea and a goalless draw to the then-highest ranked side in AFC at home, Iran. However, China followed that with a home defeat to Syria and an away defeat to Uzbekistan. Gao Hongbo resigned following these results. His team had been winless in the first four matches of the final qualifying stage for the World Cup, including a home loss to Syria which was criticised by a number of fans.

==== Marcello Lippi's tenure ====
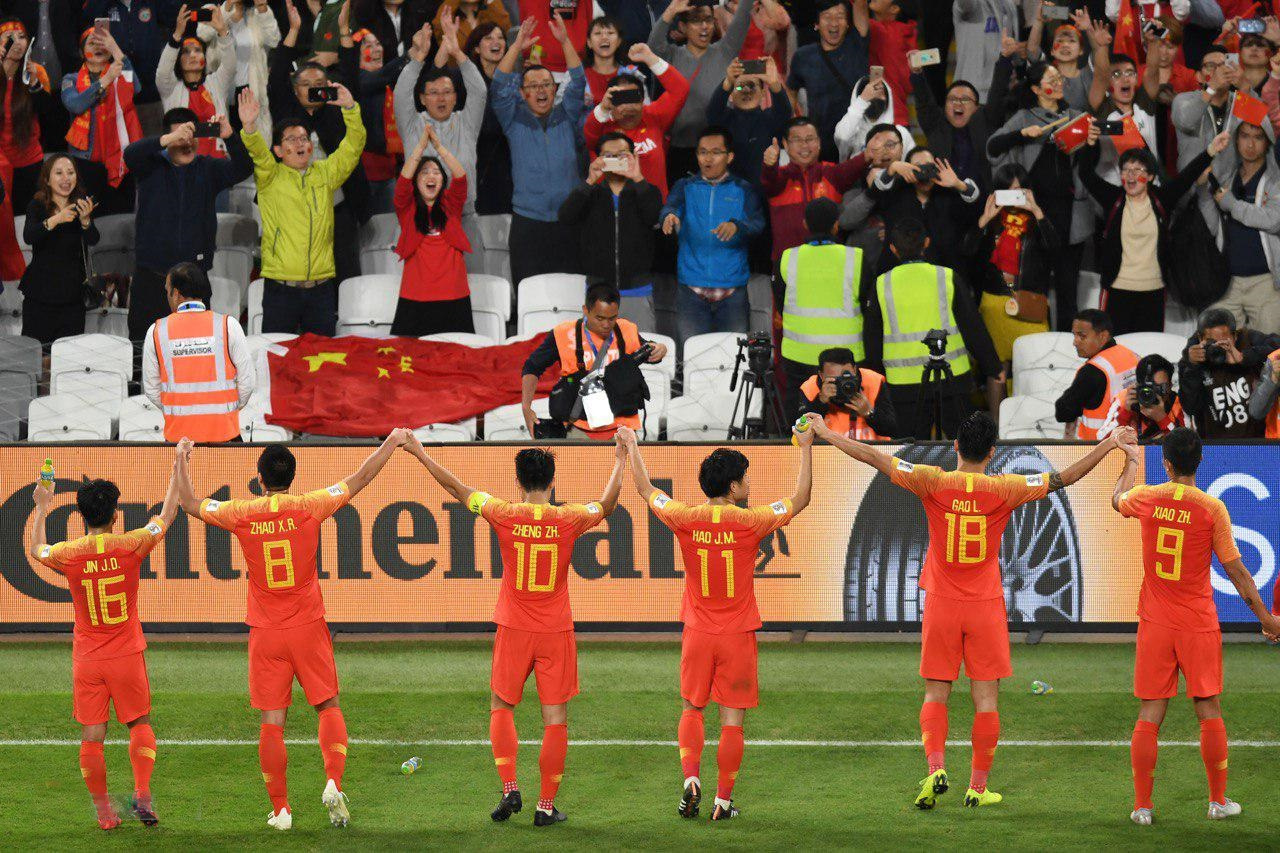
Chinese players after win against Thailand at 2019 AFC Asian Cup Round of 16

On 22 October 2016, Marcello Lippi was appointed manager of the team ahead of the remaining matches. Under Lippi, China defeated South Korea for the first time in a FIFA-sanctioned tournament, amidst tensions over South Korea's deployment of THAAD. However, China's away loss to Iran and a 2–2 draw to Syria meant China failed to qualify for the 2018 World Cup.

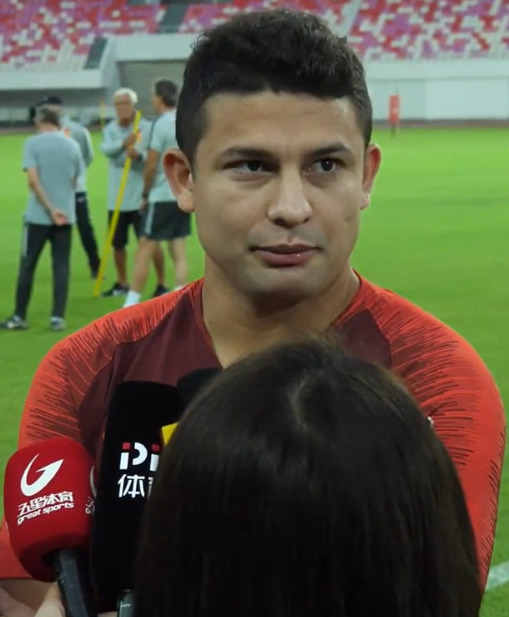
Ai Kesen played his first game for the national football team of China in 2019

Lippi led the side during the final stage of the 2019 AFC Asian Cup, where China won 2–1 against Kyrgyzstan and 3–0 against the Philippines, before losing 2–0 to group leaders South Korea. China then beat Thailand 2–1 to earn a place in the quarter-finals, where they were eliminated 3–0 out by Iran; Lippi subsequently confirmed his departure from the team.

Another Italian and former Ballon d'Or winner, Fabio Cannavaro was appointed as the new manager whilst maintaining his role at Guangzhou Evergrande but he stepped down after only two matches.

Lacking options for a new coach, the CFA re-appointed Marcello Lippi. To improve the team, China began a series of naturalization on foreign-based players, with Nico Yennaris (Li Ke), an English-born Cypriot, and Tyias Browning, another English-born player, being naturalized. Subsequently, Elkeson, a Brazilian player with no Chinese ancestry, was naturalized. Despite the process of naturalization, the 2022 FIFA World Cup qualification proved to be rockier than expected. The team could only beat the Maldives and Guam, before being held to a goalless draw with the Philippines and suffered a 2–1 loss to Syria, contributing to Lippi's resignation.

==== Li Tie and Li Xiaopeng's era ====
2002 FIFA World Cup ace Li Tie was appointed as China's head coach on 2 January 2020. Trailing behind Syria by five points before Li took charge, China were still unable to reclaim their first place but nonetheless managed to win all of their remaining fixtures, including an important 2–0 win over the Philippines and notably a 3–1 win over Syria to guarantee them as the best second-placed team, thus reaching the third round.

In the third round, China shared Group B with Asian powerhouses Japan, Australia and Saudi Arabia, alongside Oman and Vietnam. The Chinese started poorly with two losses to Australia and Japan in Doha due to the COVID-19 pandemic at home preventing the country from hosting. After this poor start, China salvaged five points in the next four matches, including a hard-fought 3–2 win over Vietnam and two 1–1 draws to Oman and especially Australia, all occurring in Sharjah, the UAE. However, despite these improvements, Li Tie was sacked on 2 December 2021 amidst heavy criticism.

After Li Tie's resignation, his World Cup teammate Li Xiaopeng took the head coach position with immense pressure. China's first game under Li Xiaopeng, however, was a 2–0 away defeat to Japan in Saitama, effectively ending China's hopes of finishing in the top two and could only rely on the play-offs. Yet, on 1 February 2022, coinciding with the traditional Lunar New Year, the Chinese stumbled to a shock 3–1 loss to Vietnam in Hanoi, officially extending China's hunt for a second World Cup appearance to 24 years. This defeat, the first in Chinese football history to Vietnam, triggered widespread anger and criticism amongst Chinese fans.

==== The Yugoslav era ====
After a poor performance in World Cup qualification, China took part in the 2022 EAFF E-1 Football Championship under interim manager Aleksandar Janković. Under the leadership of Janković, China finished with four points and finishing third after a 1–0 win over Hong Kong. For the first time in 12 years, China did not lose to Japan away. Because of this result, Janković was named as the permanent coach of the China national team in 2023, with the aim to qualify for the 2026 FIFA World Cup.

On 1 January 2024, China suffered a 2–1 defeat to Hong Kong in an international friendly, marking their first loss to HK in 39 years. Furthermore, for the first time, China failed to score in three consecutive matches at the AFC Asian Cup as they fell to third with only two points and were later eliminated. This result and poor performance of the side triggered outrage in China, and Aleksandar Janković would be dismissed on 31 January 2024.

On 25 February 2024, Branko Ivanković succeeded Janković as China's new coach. Under his tenure, China only managed to reach the third round of World Cup qualification by the slimmest of margins, owing to China's superior head-to-head record against Thailand. In the first match of the third round, China suffered a heavy 7–0 defeat to Japan. Ivanković was sacked by the CFA on 27 June 2025 , after the team's elimination from the qualifiers, finishing fifth with a goal difference of –13, the lowest in the round tied by Kuwait.

After failing to qualify for the 2026 World Cup, Dejan Đurđević took charge as the caretaker manager of the national team. The team participated in the 2025 EAFF E-1 Football Championship, where they finished in third place after losing 3–0 to South Korea and 2–0 to Japan.

==== Shao Jiayi era ====
On 5 November 2025, Qingdao West Coast head coach Shao Jiayi was appointed as the new manager.

== Team image ==
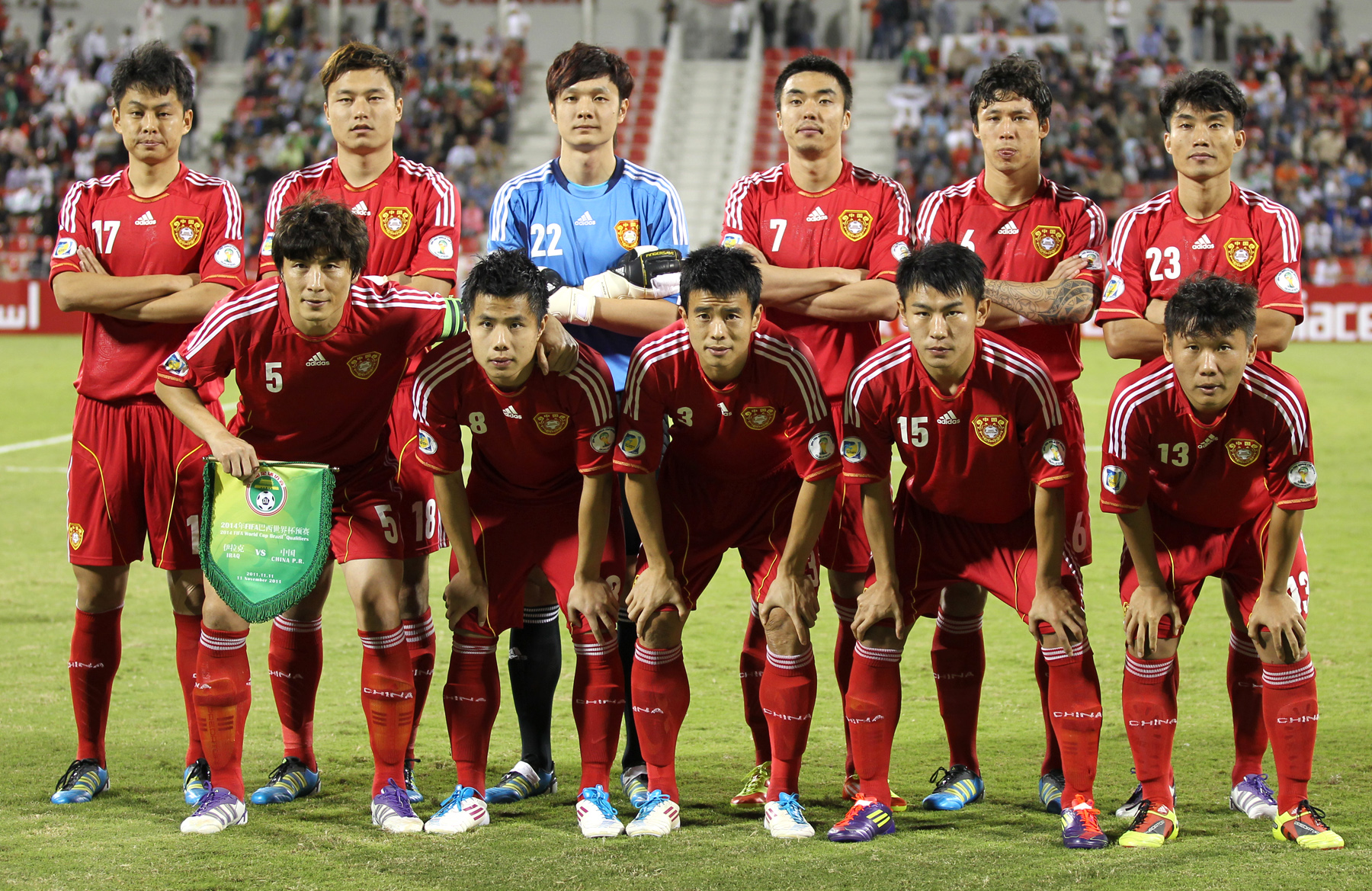
The national football team of China in 2011

The team is known as the "Dragon Team" (Chinese: 龙之队; pinyin: Lóng zhī duì), "Team China" (Chinese: 中国队), the "National Team" (Chinese: 国家队) or "Guózú" (Chinese: 国足, short for Chinese: 国家足球队; pinyin: Guójiā Zúqiú Duì; lit. 'national football team').

China's home kit is traditionally all-red with a white or yellow trim. Their away kit is traditionally an inverted version of the home kit, fully white with a red trim, sometimes is full yellow and red trim. During the 1996 AFC Asian Cup, China employed a third kit which was all blue with a white trim and was used against Saudi Arabia during the tournament. The 2022–24 season marks the first time the team had a turquoise blue away kit, replace the white kit worn in previous seasons. The team has also started to use cooling vests in certain warmer climates. After decades of having Adidas producing the team's kits, China's current kit has been produced and manufactured by Nike since 2015.

Kit supplier	Period	Contract announcement	Contract duration	Value	Notes
(Germany) Adidas	1991–2014				
(United States) Nike	2015–present	2015-01-03	2015–2026 (11 years)	$16 million per year	

=== Rivalries ===
==== Japan ====
China's greatest arch-rival is Japan, this rivalry is fueled by longstanding tensions between the two countries, strained by geopolitical competition and Japan's 20th century invasion of China. In the 21st century the results on the pitch have been overwhelmingly one-sided in Japan's favor. The rivalry was exemplified after their 3–1 defeat in the 2004 AFC Asian Cup Final on home soil. The defeat led to a riot by Chinese fans at the Workers' Stadium, provoked by controversial officiating during the tournament and heightened anti-Japanese sentiment at the time. China has not beaten Japan since March 1998.

==== South Korea ====
Another rival is neighbour South Korea. China has played 27 matches against South Korea between 1978 and 2010 without winning a single match. The media coined the term "Koreaphobia" to describe this phenomenon, but China finally registered its first win against South Korea on 10 February 2010, winning 3–0 during the 2010 East Asian Football Championship and eventually going on to win the tournament. Traced further, China met South Korea (then known as Korea) for the first time in 1949 in a friendly in British Hong Kong, where China clinched the first and only win over Korea in 61 years. There is also another political dimension behind the fuelling of this rivalry, mostly because of the long history of wars between the two states. In over 39 official matches since they first played in 1978, China has only won twice.

==== Hong Kong ====
A rivalry with Hong Kong has been created due to political tensions as well as issues during 2018 World Cup qualification. With Hong Kong fans booing the Chinese national anthem, which Hong Kong shares with China, the 2018 World Cup qualifier matches were very tense with both matches resulting in 0–0 draws.

== Results and fixtures ==
The following is a list of match results in the last 12 months, as well as any future matches that have been scheduled.

Win Draw Loss Fixture

=== 2026 ===
20 January Unofficial friendly	China	2–0	Arabian Falcons	Dubai, United Arab Emirates
17:00 UTC+4	Zhang Yuning; Lin Liangming

23 January Unofficial friendly	China	2–2	Spartak Moscow	Dubai, United Arab Emirates
17:30 UTC+4	Zhu Pengyu 20'; Lin Liangming 63'	Report	Martins 22'; Zabolotny 79'

26 January Unofficial friendly	China	2–2	Uzbekistan	Dubai, United Arab Emirates
17:30 UTC+4	Lin Liangming 12' (pen.); Xie Wenneng 20'	Report	J. Khusanov 90+1'; Karimov 105'
Note: The match was composed of three 35-minute periods.

27 March 2026 FIFA Series	China	2–0	Curaçao	Sydney, Australia
17:00 UTC+11	Wei Shihao 45+2'; Zhang Yuning 59'	Report		Stadium: Stadium Australia; Attendance: 7,578; Referee: Alex King (Australia)

31 March 2026 FIFA Series	Cameroon	2–0	China	Melbourne, Australia
17:00 UTC+11	Etta Eyong 3'; Alioum 9'	Report		Stadium: Melbourne Rectangular Stadium; Attendance: 16,764; Referee: Alireza Faghani (Australia)

5 June Friendly	Singapore	1–2	China	Kallang, Singapore
19:30 UTC+8	Ilhan 76'	Report	Serginho 16'; Zhang Yuning 41' (pen.)	Stadium: Jalan Besar Stadium; Attendance: 4,688; Referee: Rustam Lutfullin (Uzbekistan)

9 June Friendly	China	0–0	Thailand	Jinhua, China
19:35 UTC+8		Report		Stadium: Jinhua Stadium; Attendance: 27,005; Referee: Ko Hyung-jin (South Korea)

24 September Friendly	China	3–0	Maldives	Chongqing, China
19:35 UTC+8	Wang Ziming 50', 56', 63'	Report		Stadium: Longxing Football Stadium; Attendance: 11,680; Referee: Asker Nadjafaliev (Uzbekistan)

27 September 2026 China Competition	China	0–3	New Zealand	Chongqing, China
19:35 UTC+8		Report	Bindon 4'; Waine 29'; Parker-Price 82'	Stadium: Longxing Football Stadium; Attendance: 15,160; Referee: Choi Hyun-jai (South Korea)

2 October 2026 China Competition	China	0–5	Palestine	Chongqing, China
19:35 UTC+8		Report	Al-Hamlawi 16', 22'; Dabbagh 45+5', 54'; Al-Qaq 90+3'	Stadium: Longxing Football Stadium; Attendance: 28,537; Referee: Asker Nadjafaliev (Uzbekistan)

6 October 2026 China Competition	China	0–1	Tajikistan	Chongqing, China
19:35 UTC+8		Report	Hanonov 53'	Stadium: Longxing Football Stadium; Attendance: 19,984; Referee: Choi Hyun-jai (South Korea)

14 November Friendly	China	2–0	Malaysia	Zhaoqing, China
20:00 UTC+8	Wang Yudong 10'; Zhang Yuning 19'			Stadium: Zhaoqing New District Sports Center Stadium

17 November Friendly	China	2–2	Bahrain	Zhaoqing, China
20:00 UTC+8	Abduweli 37'; Zhang Yuning 80' (pen.)		Kayoum 2'; Bughammar 20'	Stadium: Zhaoqing New District Sports Center Stadium

=== 2027 ===
TBA 2027 Asian Cup GS	Iran	v	China	Riyadh, Saudi Arabia
--:-- UTC+3				Stadium: Kingdom Arena

TBA 2027 Asian Cup GS	China	v	Syria	Jeddah, Saudi Arabia
--:-- UTC+3				Stadium: Prince Abdullah Al-Faisal Stadium

TBA 2027 Asian Cup GS	Kyrgyzstan	v	China	Riyadh, Saudi Arabia
--:-- UTC+3				Stadium: Kingdom Arena

- ^{1} : Non FIFA 'A' international match

== Coaching staff ==
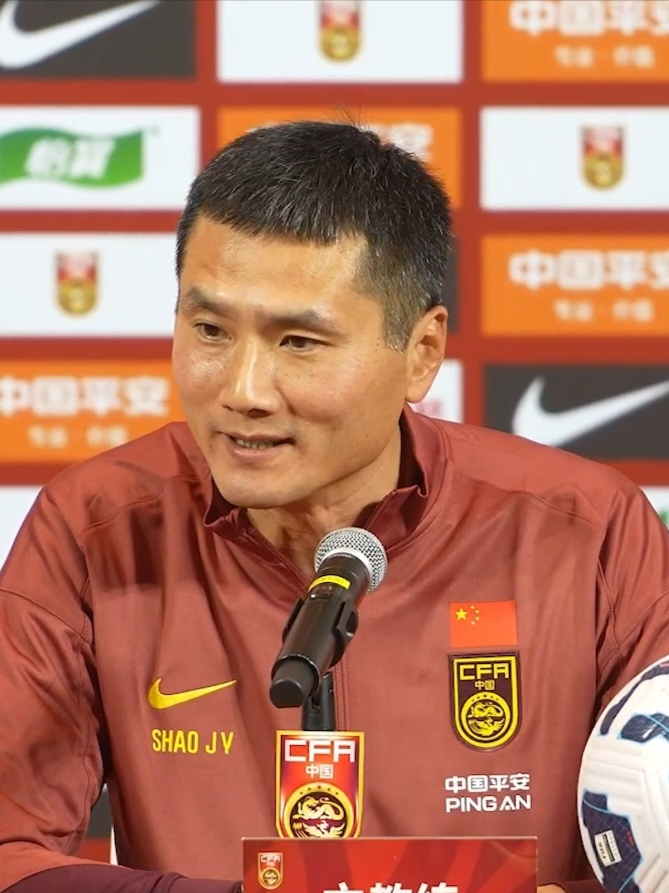
Shao Jiayi, the head coach of the China national football team since 5 November 2025

Position	Name	
Technical director	(China) Gao Hongbo	
Head coach	(China) Shao Jiayi	
Assistant coaches
Assistant coaches	(China) Zhou Ting	(Germany) Reiner Maurer
Assistant coaches	(Spain) Javi Morillas	
Goalkeeping coach	(China) Yang Zhi	
Trainer	(China) Liu Jian	
Trainer	(China) Yu Hanchao	
Fitness coach	(Spain) Telmo de Andrés	
Analysts	(China) Li Duliang	
Team doctor	(China) Wang Shucheng	
Team doctor	(China) Jin Ri	
Team coordinator	(China) Sui Han	
Physiotherapist	(China) Jiang Wenyu	
Physiotherapist	(China) Xie Ziyan	

=== Coaching history ===
==== 1930–1948 ====
#	Name	Game	Record
1	(Hong Kong) (Republic of China (1912–1949)) Tong Fuk Cheung	1930 Far Eastern Games	Champions
2	(Hong Kong) (Republic of China (1912–1949)) Lee Wai Tong (Note: Also as a player.)	1934 Far Eastern Games	Champions
3	(Hong Kong) Ngan Shing Kwan	1936 Summer Olympics	First round
4	(Hong Kong) (Republic of China (1912–1949)) Lee Wai Tong (2nd time)	1948 Summer Olympics	First round

==== 1951–present ====
As of 29 September 2026

#	Name	Period	Played	Won	Drawn	Lost	Win %
1	(China) Li Fenglou	1 July 1952 – 30 August 1952	1	0	0	1	0%
2	(China) Ke Lun	2–26 June 1956	2	2	0	0	100%
3	(China) Dai Linjing	1 January – 31 December 1957	4	1	1	2	25%
4	(China) Chen Chengda	1 January 1958 – 31 December 1962	5	4	0	1	80%
5	(China) Nian Weisi	1 January – 30 March 1963	6	2	2	2	33%
6	(China) Chen Chengda (2nd time)	1 April – 30 November 1963	8	6	1	1	75%
7	(China) Fang Renqiu	1–31 October 1964	1	0	0	1	0%
8	(China) Nian Weisi (2nd time)	1 January 1965 – 31 July 1974	23	17	5	1	74%
9	(China) Ren Bin	1 August 1974 – 31 December 1976	20	11	4	5	55%
10	(China) Zhang Honggen	1 January – 30 September 1977	1	1	0	0	100%
11	(China) Nian Weisi (3rd time)	1 October 1977 – 28 February 1978	6	3	1	2	50%
12	(China) Nian Weisi (4th time)	1 May 1978 – 20 May 1980	18	11	2	5	61%
13	(China) Su Yongshun	1 July 1980 – 11 January 1982	18	9	4	5	50%
14	(China) Su Yongshun (2nd time)	20–25 July 1982	2	1	1	0	50%
15	(China) Zeng Xuelin	1 January 1983 – 20 May 1985	36	21	4	11	58%
16	(China) Nian Weisi (5th time)	1 September 1985 – 2 October 1986	18	12	3	3	67%
17	(China) Gao Fengwen	5 December 1986 – 2 October 1990	51	26	10	15	51%
18	(China) Xu Genbao	29 March 1991 – 1 February 1992	0	0	0	0	0%
19	(China) Chen Xirong	1 March – 30 April 1992	5	4	0	1	80%
20	(Germany) Klaus Schlappner	15 June – 16 December 1992	10	2	5	3	20%
21	(Germany) Klaus Schlappner (2nd time)	25 January 1993 – 4 March 1994	16	8	2	6	50%
22	(China) Qi Wusheng	25 April 1994 – 13 November 1997	51	26	11	14	51%
23	(England) Bobby Houghton	1 February 1998 – 10 December 1999	16	10	3	3	63%
*	(China) Jin Zhiyang (caretaker)	2000	5	5	0	0	100.00%
24	(Federal Republic of Yugoslavia) Bora Milutinović	1 February 2000 – 31 December 2001	38	19	9	10	50%
25	(Federal Republic of Yugoslavia) Bora Milutinović (2nd time)	1 March – 14 June 2002	7	1	1	5	14%
*	(China) Shen Xiangfu (caretaker)	2002	3	1	2	0	33%
26	(Netherlands) Arie Haan	1 January 2003 – 18 November 2004	30	17	7	6	57%
27	(China) Zhu Guanghu	6 March 2005 – 21 August 2007	27	9	6	33%	
28	(Serbia) Vladimir Petrović	14 September 2007 – 22 June 2008	17	5	7	5	29%
*	(China) Yin Tiesheng (caretaker)	2008–2009	6	2	0	4	33%
29	(China) Gao Hongbo	4 May 2009 – 13 August 2011	37	22	11	4	59%
30	(Spain) José Antonio Camacho	14 August 2011 – 21 June 2013	19	6	2	11	32%
*	(China) Fu Bo (caretaker)	2013–2014	8	4	4	0	50%
31	(France) Alain Perrin	1 March 2014 – 7 January 2016	26	11	10	5	42%
32	(China) Gao Hongbo (2nd time)	3 February – 11 October 2016	7	3	1	3	43%
33	(Italy) Marcello Lippi	22 October 2016 – 24 January 2019	29	10	9	10	34%
*	(Italy) Fabio Cannavaro (caretaker)	2019	2	0	0	2	0%
34	(Italy) Marcello Lippi (2nd time)	24 May – 14 November 2019	5	4	1	0	80%
*	(China) Li Tie (caretaker)	2019	3	1	0	2	33%
35	(China) Li Tie	2 January 2020 – 3 December 2021	10	5	2	3	50%
36	(China) Li Xiaopeng	3 December 2021 – 30 March 2022	4	0	1	3	0%
*	(Serbia) Aleksandar Janković (caretaker)	2022	3	1	1	1	33%
37	(Serbia) Aleksandar Janković	24 February 2023 – 24 February 2024	15	4	4	7	27%
38	(Croatia) Branko Ivanković	24 February 2024 – 27 June 2025	10	3	2	5	30%
*	(Serbia) Dejan Đurđević (caretaker)	27 June 2025 – 5 November 2025	3	1	0	2	67%
39	(China) Shao Jiayi	5 November 2025 –	9	4	3	2	50%

== Players ==
=== Current squad ===
The following players were called up for the friendly matches against Malaysia and Bahrain on 14 November and 17 November 2026.

Caps and goals are as of 6 October 2026, after the match against Tajikistan.

No.	Pos.	Player	Date of birth (age)	Caps	Goals	Club
	GK	Yan Junling	28 January 1991 (age 35)	65	0	(Chinese Football Association) Shanghai Port
	GK	Yan Bingliang	30 April 2000 (age 26)	2	0	(Chinese Football Association) Tianjin Jinmen Tiger
	GK	Li Hao	6 March 2004 (age 22)	1	0	(Chinese Football Association) Qingdao West Coast
	DF	Liu Yang	17 June 1995 (age 31)	40	0	(Chinese Football Association) Shandong Taishan
	DF	Tyias Browning	27 May 1994 (age 32)	39	1	(Chinese Football Association) Shanghai Port
	DF	Jiang Shenglong	24 December 2000 (age 25)	21	1	(Chinese Football Association) Shanghai Shenhua
	DF	Han Pengfei	28 April 1993 (age 33)	8	0	(Chinese Football Association) Chengdu Rongcheng
	DF	Hu Hetao	5 October 2003 (age 23)	7	0	(Chinese Football Association) Chengdu Rongcheng
	DF	Alex Yang	13 June 2005 (age 21)	4	0	(Chinese Football Association) Shanghai Port
	DF	Umidjan Yusup	28 February 2004 (age 22)	4	0	(Chinese Football Association) Shanghai Port
	DF	Liu Haofan	23 October 2003 (age 23)	4	0	(Chinese Football Association) Zhejiang FC
	MF	Wu Xi	19 February 1989 (age 37)	90	9	(Chinese Football Association) Shanghai Shenhua
	MF	Wang Shangyuan	2 June 1993 (age 33)	36	1	(Chinese Football Association) Henan FC
	MF	Huang Jiahui	7 October 2000 (age 26)	10	0	(Chinese Football Association) Tianjin Jinmen Tiger
	MF	Serginho	15 March 1995 (age 31)	8	1	(Chinese Football Association) Beijing Guoan
	MF	Ming-yang Yang	11 July 1995 (age 31)	3	0	(Chinese Football Association) Chengdu Rongcheng
	MF	Huang Shenghao	1 August 2007 (age 19)	3	0	(Chinese Football Association) Guangdong GZ-Power
	MF	Xu Bin	2 May 2004 (age 22)	2	0	(The Football Association) Wolverhampton Wanderers
	FW	Zhang Yuning	5 January 1997 (age 29)	49	10	(Chinese Football Association) Beijing Guoan
	FW	Lin Liangming	4 June 1997 (age 29)	22	3	(Chinese Football Association) Beijing Guoan
	FW	Xie Wenneng	6 February 2001 (age 25)	20	1	(Chinese Football Association) Shandong Taishan
	FW	Wang Ziming	5 August 1996 (age 30)	15	3	(Chinese Football Association) Chengdu Rongcheng
	FW	Behram Abduweli	8 March 2003 (age 23)	12	1	(Chinese Football Association) Chengdu Rongcheng
	FW	Wang Yudong	23 November 2006 (age 19)	11	1	(Chinese Football Association) Zhejiang FC
	FW	Ba Dun	16 September 1995 (age 31)	8	1	(Chinese Football Association) Tianjin Jinmen Tiger
	FW	Bunyamin Abdusalam	9 April 2008 (age 18)	4	0	(Chinese Football Association) Yunnan Yukun

=== Recent call-ups ===
The following players have also been called up to the squad within the last twelve months.

Pos.	Player	Date of birth (age)	Caps	Goals	Club	Latest call-up
GK	Liu Dianzuo	25 June 1990 (age 36)	7	0	(China) Chengdu Rongcheng	v. Tajikistan, 6 October 2026
GK	Jian Tao	22 June 2001 (age 25)	0	0	(China) Chengdu Rongcheng	September 2026 training camp^{INJ}
GK	Ma Zhen	1 June 1998 (age 28)	0	0	(China) Shanghai Shenhua	March 2026 training camp
DF	Zhang Aihui	27 May 2005 (age 21)	1	0	(China) Zhejiang FC	v. New Zealand, 28 September 2026
DF	Li Yang	22 July 1997 (age 29)	3	0	(China) Chengdu Rongcheng	v. Tajikistan, 6 October 2026
DF	Wang Gengrui	16 September 2008 (age 18)	2	0	(China) Qingdao West Coast	v. New Zealand, 28 September 2026
DF	Wei Zhen	12 January 1997 (age 29)	11	0	(China) Shanghai Port	v. Tajikistan, 6 October 2026
DF	Gao Zhunyi	21 August 1995 (age 31)	23	0	(China) Shandong Taishan	v. Tajikistan, 6 October 2026
DF	Zhu Chenjie	23 August 2000 (age 26)	42	1	(China) Shanghai Shenhua	v. Thailand, 9 June 2026
DF	Li Lei	30 May 1992 (age 34)	20	0	(China) Beijing Guoan	January 2026 training camp
DF	Wu Shaocong	20 March 2000 (age 26)	7	0	(China) Beijing Guoan	January 2026 training camp
DF	Lü Zhuoyi	16 April 2001 (age 25)	0	0	(China) Dalian Yingbo	January 2026 training camp
FW	Chen Pu	15 January 1997 (age 29)	11	0	(China) Shandong Taishan	v. Tajikistan, 6 October 2026
MF	Cheng Jin	18 February 1995 (age 31)	4	0	(China) Zhejiang FC	v. New Zealand, 28 September 2026
MF	Gao Tianyi	1 July 1998 (age 28)	12	0	(China) Shanghai Shenhua	v. Tajikistan, 6 October 2026
MF	Dai Wai Tsun	25 July 1999 (age 27)	18	0	(China) Shenzhen Peng City	v. Palestine, 2 October 2026
MF	Mao Weijie	28 May 2005 (age 21)	2	0	(China) Dalian Yingbo	v. Thailand, 9 June 2026
MF	Li Zhenquan	16 December 2003 (age 22)	0	0	(China) Chongqing Tonglianglong	March 2026 training camp
MF	Huang Zhengyu	24 January 1997 (age 29)	7	1	(China) Shandong Taishan	March 2026 training camp
MF	Kuai Jiwen	28 February 2006 (age 20)	3	0	(China) Shanghai Port	v. Curaçao, 27 March 2026
MF	Xu Haoyang	15 January 1999 (age 27)	9	0	(China) Shanghai Shenhua	January 2026 training camp
MF	Li Yuanyi	28 August 1993 (age 33)	9	0	(China) Shandong Taishan	January 2026 training camp
MF	Cao Yongjing	15 February 1997 (age 29)	5	0	(China) Beijing Guoan	January 2026 training camp
MF	Duan Liuyu	24 July 1998 (age 28)	0	0	(China) Shandong Taishan	January 2026 training camp
FW	Zhao Songyuan	7 April 2009 (age 17)	3	0	(China) Tsinghua University High School	v. Tajikistan, 6 October 2026
FW	Yang Mingrui	5 April 2007 (age 19)	3	0	(China) Dalian Yingbo	v. Tajikistan, 6 October 2026
FW	Du Yuezheng	14 September 2005 (age 21)	1	0	(China) Chongqing Tonglianglong	v. Maldives, 24 September 2026
FW	Zhong Yihao	23 March 1996 (age 30)	2	0	(China) Henan FC	v. Tajikistan, 6 October 2026
FW	Tao Qianglong	20 November 2001 (age 25)	7	0	(China) Zhejiang FC	v. Palestine, 2 October 2026
FW	Wei Shihao	8 April 1995 (age 31)	47	5	(China) Chengdu Rongcheng	v. Tajikistan, 6 October 2026
FW	Wu Lei	19 November 1991 (age 35)	101	36	(China) Shanghai Port	v. Thailand, 9 June 2026
FW	Zhu Pengyu	9 May 2005 (age 21)	1	0	(China) Dalian Yingbo	v. Singapore, 5 June 2026
FW	Liu Chengyu	2 July 2006 (age 20)	4	0	(China) Shanghai Shenhua	v. Curaçao, 27 March 2026
^{INJ} Withdrew due to injury^{PRE} Preliminary squad^{RET} Retired from the national team^{SUS} Serving suspension^{WD} Withdrew due to non-injury related reasons

== Player records ==
As of 4 June 2026.
Players in bold are still active with China.

=== Most appearances ===
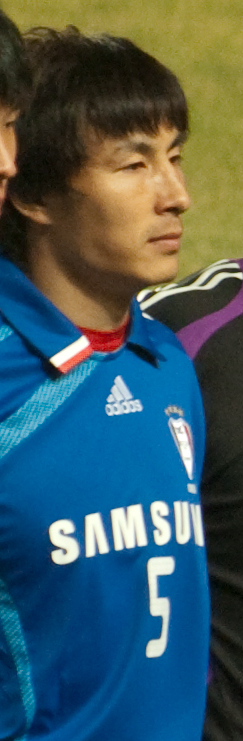
Li Weifeng is China's most capped player with 112 appearances.

Rank	Name	Caps	Goals	Career
1	Li Weifeng	112	14	1998–2011
2	Zhu Bo	111	2	1983–1993
3	Fan Zhiyi	110	17	1992–2002
4	Gao Lin	109	22	2005–2019
5	Zheng Zhi	108	15	2002–2019
6	Hao Haidong	106	39	1992–2004
7	Zhang Linpeng	105	6	2009–2024
8	**Wu Lei**	101	36	2010–present
9	Li Ming	96	6	1992–2004
10	Li Tie	93	5	1997–2007

=== Top goalscorers ===
Rank	Name	Goals	Caps	Ratio	Career
1	Hao Haidong	39	106	0.38	1992–2004
2	**Wu Lei**	36	101	0.36	2010–present
3	Liu Haiguang	31	77	0.4	1983–1990
4	Ma Lin	29	59	0.49	1985–1990
5	Yang Xu	28	54	0.52	2009–2019
6	Su Maozhen	27	55	0.49	1994–2002
7	Li Jinyu	25	72	0.35	1997–2008
8	Li Bing	22	74	0.3	1992–2001
8	Gao Lin	22	109	0.2	2005–2019
10	Zhao Dayu	20	30	0.67	1982–1986

== Competitive record ==
=== FIFA World Cup ===
China has only appeared at one World Cup with the appearance being in the 2002 FIFA World Cup where they finished bottom of the group which included a 2–0 loss to Costa Rica, a 4–0 loss to Brazil, and a 3–0 loss to Turkey.

China's FIFA World Cup record									Qualification record						
Year	Round	Position	M	W	D	L	GF	GA	M	W	D	L	GF	GA	Link
(Uruguay) 1930	Not a FIFA member								Not a FIFA member						Link
(Italy) 1934	Did not enter								Declined participation						Link
(France) 1938	Did not enter								Declined participation						Link
(Brazil) 1950	Did not enter								Declined participation						Link
(Switzerland) 1954	Did not enter								Declined participation						Link
(Sweden) 1958	Did not qualify								3	1	1	1	4	5	Link
(Chile) 1962	Did not enter								Declined participation						Link
(England) 1966	Did not enter								Declined participation						Link
(Mexico) 1970	Did not enter								Declined participation						Link
(Germany) 1974	Did not enter								Declined participation						Link
(Argentina) 1978	Did not enter								Declined participation						Link
(Spain) 1982	Did not qualify								12	7	2	3	19	8	Link
(Mexico) 1986	Did not qualify								6	4	1	1	23	2	Link
(Italy) 1990	Did not qualify								11	7	0	4	18	9	Link
(United States) 1994	Did not qualify								8	6	0	2	18	4	Link
(France) 1998	Did not qualify								14	8	3	3	24	16	Link
(South Korea) (Japan) 2002	Group stage	31st	3	0	0	3	0	9	14	12	1	1	38	5	Link
(Germany) 2006	Did not qualify								6	5	0	1	14	1	Link
(South Africa) 2010	Did not qualify								8	3	3	2	14	4	Link
(Brazil) 2014	Did not qualify								8	5	0	3	23	9	Link
(Russia) 2018	Did not qualify								18	8	5	5	35	11	Link
(Qatar) 2022	Did not qualify								18	7	4	7	39	22	Link
(Canada) (Mexico) (United States) 2026	Did not qualify								16	5	2	9	16	29	Link
(Morocco) (Portugal) (Spain) 2030	To be determined														
(Saudi Arabia) 2034	To be determined														
**Total**	**Group stage**	**1/23**	**3**	**0**	**0**	**3**	**0**	**9**	**142**	**78**	**22**	**42**	**285**	**125**	Link

=== AFC Asian Cup ===
China's AFC Asian Cup record									Qualification record						
Year	Round	Position	Pld	W	D	L	GF	GA	Pld	W	D	L	GF	GA	Link
(Hong Kong) 1956	Did not enter								Did not enter						Link
(South Korea) 1960	Did not enter								Did not enter						Link
(Israel) 1964	Did not enter								Did not enter						Link
(Iran) 1968	Did not enter								Did not enter						Link
(Thailand) 1972	Did not enter								Did not enter						Link
(Iran) 1976	Third place	**3rd**	**4**	**1**	**1**	**2**	**2**	**4**	5	4	0	1	14	4	Link
(Kuwait) 1980	Group stage	7th	4	1	1	2	9	5	3	2	0	1	5	2	Link
(Singapore) 1984	Runners-up	**2nd**	**6**	**4**	**0**	**2**	**11**	**4**	4	4	0	0	15	0	Link
(Qatar) 1988	Fourth place	**4th**	**6**	**2**	**2**	**2**	**7**	**5**	5	2	3	0	10	1	Link
(Japan) 1992	Third place	**3rd**	**5**	**1**	**3**	**1**	**6**	**6**	3	3	0	0	7	0	Link
(United Arab Emirates) 1996	Quarter-finals	8th	4	1	0	3	6	7	3	3	0	0	16	1	Link
(Lebanon) 2000	Fourth place	**4th**	**6**	**2**	**2**	**2**	**11**	**7**	3	3	0	0	29	0	Link
(China) 2004	Runners-up	**2nd**	**6**	**3**	**2**	**1**	**13**	**6**	Qualified as hosts						Link
(Indonesia) (Malaysia) (Thailand) (Vietnam) 2007	Group stage	9th	3	1	1	1	7	6	6	3	2	1	7	3	Link
(Qatar) 2011	Group stage	9th	3	1	1	1	4	4	6	4	1	1	13	5	Link
(Australia) 2015	Quarter-finals	7th	4	3	0	1	5	4	6	2	2	2	5	6	Link
(United Arab Emirates) 2019	Quarter-finals	6th	5	3	0	2	7	7	8	5	2	1	27	1	Link
(Qatar) 2023	Group stage	18th	3	0	2	1	0	1	8	6	1	1	30	3	Link
(Saudi Arabia) 2027	Qualified								6	2	2	2	9	9	Link
Total	14/19	0 titles	59	23	15	21	88	66	66	43	13	10	187	35	Link

=== Summer Olympics ===
Year	Result	Pos	Pld	W	D	L	GF	GA
(France) 1900 to (Netherlands) 1928	Did not enter							
(Germany) 1936	First round	12	1	0	0	1	0	2
(United Kingdom) 1948	First round	14	1	0	0	1	0	4
(Finland) 1952 to (Australia) 1956	Withdrew after qualifying							
(Italy) 1960 to (Canada) 1976	Not an IOC member							
(Soviet Union) 1980 to (United States) 1984	Did not qualify							
(South Korea) 1988	First round	14	3	0	1	2	0	5
**Total**	3/19	-	5	0	1	4	0	11

For 1992 to 2024, see China national under-23 football team

=== Asian Games ===
Year	Result	Rank	Pld	W	D	L	GF	GA
(India) 1951	Did not enter							
1954	Did not enter							
(Japan) 1958	Did not enter							
1962	Did not enter							
1966	Did not enter							
1970	Did not enter							
(Iran) 1974	First round	10	3	1	0	2	7	4
(Thailand) 1978	Third place	3	7	5	0	2	16	5
(India) 1982	Quarter-finals	7	4	2	1	1	4	3
(South Korea) 1986	Quarter-finals	8	4	2	1	1	10	7
(China) 1990	Quarter-finals	6	4	2	0	2	8	4
(Japan) 1994	Runners-up	2	7	5	1	1	16	8
(Thailand) 1998	Third place	3	8	6	0	2	24	7
**Total***	**7/13**	-	**37**	**23**	**3**	**11**	**85**	**38**

* Including 1998 onwards (until 2010)

For 2002 to 2022, see China national under-23 football team

=== EAFF East Asian Cup ===
Year	Result	Pld	W	D	L	GF	GA
(Japan) 2003	Third place	3	1	0	2	3	4
(South Korea) 2005	**Champions**	3	1	2	0	5	3
(China) 2008	Third place	3	1	0	2	5	5
(Japan) 2010	**Champions**	3	2	1	0	5	0
(South Korea) 2013	Runners-up	3	1	2	0	7	6
(China) 2015	Runners-up	3	1	1	1	3	3
(Japan) 2017	Third place	3	0	2	1	4	5
(South Korea) 2019	Third place	3	1	0	2	3	3
(Japan) 2022	Third place	3	1	1	1	1	3
(South Korea) 2025	Third place	3	1	0	2	1	5
**Total**	**10/10**	**30**	**10**	**9**	**11**	**37**	**37**

== Head-to-head record ==
=== Since 1924 ===
As of 14 November 2026 after match against Malaysia.

Positive Record Neutral Record Negative Record

Nations	First Played	Played	Win	Draw	Loss	Goals For	Goals Against	Goal Diff	Win Percentage (Note: A draw counts as a ½ win.)	Confederation
Afghanistan	1984	1	1	0	0	6	0	+6	100%	AFC
Albania	1973	1	0	1	0	1	1	0	0%	UEFA
Algeria	2004	1	1	0	0	1	0	+1	100%	CAF
Andorra	2004	1	0	1	0	0	0	0	0%	UEFA
Argentina	1984	1	1	0	0	1	0	+1	100%	CONMEBOL
Australia	1927	17	5	3	9	23	32	−9	29.41%	AFC
Bahrain	1986	9	5	4	0	16	8	+8	55.56%	AFC
Bangladesh	1980	5	5	0	0	15	0	+15	100%	AFC
Bhutan	2015	2	2	0	0	18	0	+18	100%	AFC
Bosnia and Herzegovina	1997	1	1	0	0	3	0	+3	100%	UEFA
Botswana	2009	1	1	0	0	4	1	+3	100%	CAF
Brazil	2002	3	0	1	2	0	12	−12	0%	CONMEBOL
Brunei	1975	3	3	0	0	22	1	+21	100%	AFC
Cambodia	1963	6	6	0	0	24	3	+21	100%	AFC
Cameroon	2026	1	0	0	1	0	2	−2	0%	CAF
Canada	1986	2	2	0	0	3	0	+3	100%	CONCACAF
Chile	2003	1	0	1	0	0	0	0	0%	CONMEBOL
Colombia	1995	4	1	1	2	4	8	−4	25%	CONMEBOL
Costa Rica	2002	5	1	2	2	6	8	−2	20%	CONCACAF
Croatia	2017	1	0	1	0	1	1	0	0%	UEFA
Cuba	1971	1	1	0	0	1	0	+1	100%	CONCACAF
Curaçao	2026	1	1	0	0	2	0	+2	100%	CONCACAF
Czech Republic	2018	1	0	0	1	1	4	−3	0%	UEFA
Egypt	1963	2	0	1	1	0	2	−2	0%	CAF
El Salvador	2008	1	0	1	0	2	2	0	0%	CONCACAF
England (Note: The Great Britain Olympic football team's matches at the 1936 Summer Olympics are counted as England's FIFA A-level match.)	1936	2	0	0	2	0	5	−5	0%	UEFA
Estonia	2003	2	2	0	0	4	0	+4	100%	UEFA
Finland	1952	4	3	0	1	6	7	−1	75%	UEFA
France	2006	2	1	0	1	2	3	−1	50%	UEFA
Germany	2005	2	0	1	1	1	2	−1	0%	UEFA
Ghana	1978	2	1	1	0	3	1	+2	50%	CAF
Guam	2000	3	3	0	0	33	0	+33	100%	AFC
Guinea	1972	2	1	1	0	6	3	+3	50%	CAF
Haiti	2003	2	0	1	1	5	6	−1	0%	CONCACAF
Honduras	2006	3	1	1	1	3	1	+2	33.33%	CONCACAF
Hong Kong	1975	28	19	7	2	49	7	+42	66.67%	AFC
Hungary	2004	1	1	0	0	2	1	+1	100%	UEFA
Iceland	2017	1	0	0	1	0	2	−2	0%	UEFA
India	1936	14	8	5	1	24	7	+17	57.14%	AFC
Indonesia	1934	19	12	3	4	44	16	+28	63.16%	AFC
Iran	1976	25	5	7	13	21	43	−22	20%	AFC
Iraq	1976	19	7	3	9	19	19	0	36.84%	AFC
Italy	1986	1	0	0	1	0	2	−2	0%	UEFA
Jamaica	1977	3	3	0	0	5	0	+5	100%	CONCACAF
Japan	1925	39	12	9	18	53	57	−4	30.77%	AFC
Jordan	1984	12	6	5	1	25	9	+16	50%	AFC
Kazakhstan	1997	3	2	0	1	5	2	+3	66.67%	UEFA
North Korea	1960	21	10	6	5	28	19	+9	47.62%	AFC
South Korea	1978	39	2	13	24	26	59	−33	5.13%	AFC
Kuwait	1975	18	8	5	5	24	16	+8	44.44%	AFC
Kyrgyzstan	2009	2	2	0	0	5	1	+4	100%	AFC
Laos	2011	2	2	0	0	13	3	+10	100%	AFC
Latvia	2010	1	1	0	0	1	0	+1	100%	UEFA
Lebanon	1998	6	4	2	0	13	1	+12	66.67%	AFC
Macau	1978	6	6	0	0	25	3	+22	100%	AFC
Malaysia	1948	16	11	4	1	37	8	+29	68.75%	AFC
Maldives	2001	7	7	0	0	31	1	+30	100%	AFC
Mali	1963	3	2	0	1	8	4	+4	66.67%	CAF
Mexico	1987	3	0	0	3	2	7	−5	0%	CONCACAF
Myanmar	1956	11	9	0	2	35	4	+31	81.82%	AFC
Nepal	1972	4	4	0	0	31	2	+29	100%	AFC
Netherlands	1996	2	0	0	2	0	4	−4	0%	UEFA
New Zealand	1975	17	3	6	8	14	20	−6	17.65%	OFC
North Macedonia	2004	5	3	2	0	4	0	+4	60%	UEFA
Norway	1992	1	1	0	0	2	1	+1	100%	UEFA
Oman	1998	10	4	1	5	15	13	+2	40%	AFC
Pakistan	1963	9	5	2	2	23	10	+13	55.56%	AFC
Palestine	1966	8	5	2	1	17	7	+10	62.5%	AFC
Papua New Guinea	1985	2	1	1	0	5	2	+3	50%	OFC
Paraguay	1996	3	1	1	1	3	4	−1	33.33%	CONMEBOL
Peru	1978	2	1	0	1	4	3	+1	50%	CONMEBOL
Philippines	1925	13	12	1	0	50	3	+47	92.31%	AFC
Poland	1984	2	0	0	2	0	2	−2	0%	UEFA
Portugal	2002	1	0	0	1	0	2	−2	0%	UEFA
Qatar	1978	21	9	5	7	24	17	+7	42.86%	AFC
Republic of Ireland	1984	2	0	0	2	0	2	−2	0%	UEFA
Romania	1959	3	1	0	2	3	5	−2	33.33%	UEFA
Russia (Note: Includes Soviet Union.)	1959	1	0	0	1	0	1	−1	0%	UEFA
Saudi Arabia	1978	22	7	5	10	25	29	−4	31.82%	AFC
Senegal	1972	2	1	1	0	5	2	+3	50%	CAF
Serbia (Note: Includes Yugoslavia and Serbia and Montenegro before 1975.)	1956	5	0	0	5	0	11	−11	0%	UEFA
Sierra Leone	1974	1	1	0	0	4	1	+3	100%	CAF
Singapore	1948	19	13	4	2	40	12	+28	68.42%	AFC
Slovenia	2002	1	0	1	0	0	0	0	0%	UEFA
Somalia	1972	2	2	0	0	10	5	+5	100%	CAF
South Yemen	1972	2	2	0	0	10	7	+3	100%	AFC
Spain	2005	2	0	0	2	0	4	−4	0%	UEFA
Sri Lanka	1980	2	2	0	0	10	0	+10	100%	AFC
Sweden	2001	3	0	1	2	2	6	−4	0%	UEFA
Switzerland	2006	1	0	0	1	1	4	−3	0%	UEFA
Syria	1966	15	8	2	5	29	14	+15	53.33%	AFC
Tajikistan	1997	7	4	2	1	9	2	+7	57.14%	AFC
Tanzania	1966	3	2	1	0	15	4	+11	66.67%	CAF
Thailand	1948	33	21	6	6	72	25	+47	63.64%	AFC
Trinidad and Tobago	2001	2	2	0	0	7	2	+5	100%	CONCACAF
Tunisia	1988	2	0	2	0	1	1	0	0%	CAF
Turkey	1948	2	0	0	2	0	7	−7	0%	UEFA
Turkmenistan	1994	4	3	1	0	10	3	+7	75%	AFC
United Arab Emirates	1984	11	5	5	1	16	6	+10	45.45%	AFC
United States	1948	9	2	2	5	10	19	−9	22.22%	CONCACAF
Uruguay	1982	6	1	2	3	2	9	−7	16.67%	CONMEBOL
Uzbekistan	1994	15	5	2	8	17	23	−6	33.33%	AFC
Venezuela	1978	1	1	0	0	1	0	+1	100%	CONMEBOL
Vietnam (Note: Includes North Vietnam and South Vietnam before 1975.)	1960	12	11	0	1	33	11	+22	91.67%	AFC
Wales	2018	1	0	0	1	0	6	−6	0%	UEFA
Yemen	1966	5	3	1	1	11	1	+10	60%	AFC
Zambia	1972	1	0	1	0	3	3	0	0%	CAF
Zimbabwe	1997	1	1	0	0	3	1	+2	100%	CAF
**Total (107)**	1925	678	332	147	210	1198	760	+438	48.97%	

=== 1913–1923 ===
All matches before the founding of Chinese Football Association in 1924 are not counted as A-level match by FIFA:

Nations	First Played	Played	Win	Draw	Loss	Goals For	Goals Against	Goal Diff	Win Percentage	Confederation
Australia	1923	6	1	1	4	9	19	−10	16.67%	AFC
Japan	1917	3	3	0	0	14	1	+13	100%	AFC
Hong Kong	1923	1	0	1	0	1	1	0	0%	AFC
Philippines	1913	10	6	2	2	15	6	+9	60%	AFC
**Total (4)**	**1913**	**20**	**10**	**4**	**6**	**39**	**27**	**+12**	**50%**	

== Honours ==
=== Continental ===
- **AFC Asian Cup**
  - (silver) Runners-up (2): 1984, 2004
  - (bronze) Third place (2): 1976, 1992
- **Asian Games**^{1}
  - (silver) Silver medal (1): 1994
  - (bronze) Bronze medal (2): 1978, 1998

=== Regional ===
- **EAFF East Asian Cup / EAFF E-1 Football Championship**
  - (gold) Champions (2): 2005, 2010
  - (silver) Runners-up (2): 2013, 2015
  - (bronze) Third place (6): 2003, 2008, 2017, 2019, 2022, 2025
- **Far Eastern Games**
  - (gold) Gold medal (9): 1915, 1917, 1919, 1921, 1923, 1925, 1927, 1930^{s}, 1934
  - (silver) Silver medal (1): 1913

=== Friendly ===
- Dunhill Cup (1): 1997
- Four Nations Tournament (2): 2000-I, 2000-II
- King's Cup (1): 1993
- Lunar New Year Cup (1): 1978
- Merlion Cup (1): 1986
- Quaid-e-Azam International Tournament (1): 1986

=== Awards ===
- FIFA Best Mover of the Year (1): 2004
- AFC National Team of the Year (1): 2001
- AFC Asian Cup Fair Play Award (2): 1984, 2004

=== Summary ===
Only official honours are included, according to FIFA statutes (competitions organized/recognized by FIFA or an affiliated confederation).

Competition	1st place, gold medalist(s)	2nd place, silver medalist(s)	3rd place, bronze medalist(s)	Total
AFC Asian Cup	0	2	2	4
Total	0	2	2	4

Notes

1. Competition organized by OCA, officially not recognized by FIFA.
- ^{s} Shared titles.

== See also ==
- Sport in China
  - Football in China
    - Women's football in China
- China national football B team
- China national under-23 football team
- China national under-20 football team
- China national under-17 football team
- China national futsal team
- China national under-20 futsal team
- China national beach soccer team
- China women's national football team
- Chinese referees in FIFA competitions
