= Chen Xuyuan =

Chinese politician

- 陈戌源
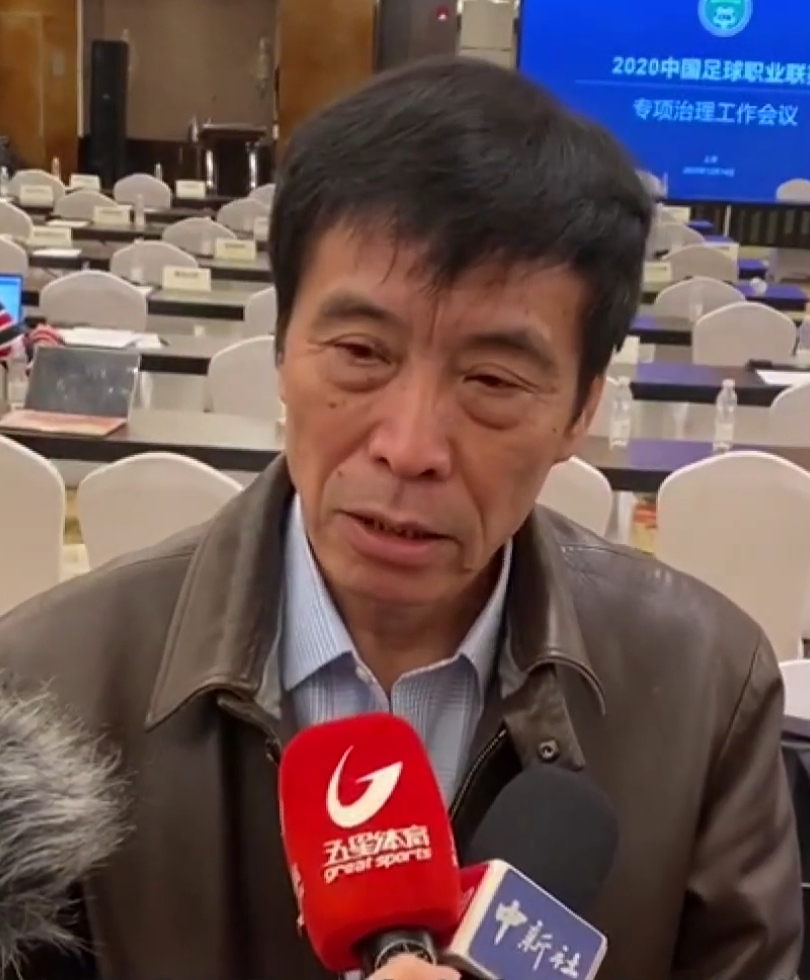
- Chen in December 2020

President of the Chinese Football Association
- In office 22 August 2019 – 16 October 2023
- Preceded by: Cai Zhenhua
- Succeeded by: Song Kai

Personal details
- Born: July 1956 (age 70) Shanghai, China
- Party: Chinese Communist Party
- Education: Shanghai Maritime University

Chinese name
- Simplified Chinese: 陈戌源
- Traditional Chinese: 陳戌源
Transcriptions
Standard Mandarin
- Hanyu Pinyin: Chén Xūyuán

Chen Xuyuan (Chinese: 陈戌源; born 1956) is a Chinese politician. He served as the president of Chinese Football Association from August 2019 to October 2023. He was president of Shanghai International Port Group before being elected to serve as CFA president.

== Election ==
He was elected in the Xianghe National Football Training Center, Hebei at the 11th membership Congress conference meetings.

== SIPG ==
Shanghai International Port Group owned the Shanghai SIPG, a Chinese Super League club.

Chen did not serve in any sports administrative body before becoming the head of CFA.

== Corruption conviction ==
On 14 February 2023, Chen was probed by the Chinese Communist Party's anti-graft watchdog, the Central Commission for Discipline Inspection for "serious disciplinary violation", which typically indicates corruption. On 26 March 2024, the Intermediate People's Court of Huangshi City, Hubei Province, sentenced Chen for accepting bribes. He was sentenced to life imprisonment for accepting bribes, deprived of political rights for life and confiscated all personal property. On 29 January 2026, he was given a lifetime ban for match-fixing by the Chinese Football Association.

Business positions
New title	Chairman of the Shanghai International Port Group; 2005–2019	Succeeded by Gu Jinshan (顾金山)
Sporting positions
Preceded by Cai Zhenhua	President of the Chinese Football Association; 2019–2023	Succeeded by Song Kai
