= Li Fenglou =

Chinese footballer and coach

Li Fenglou 李凤楼
Personal information
- Full name: Li Fenglou
- Date of birth: 15 June 1912
- Place of birth: Tongzhou, Zhili, China
- Date of death: 31 July 1988 (aged 76)
- Place of death: Beijing, China

Senior career*
Years	Team	Apps	(Gls)
- Zixing Football Team
- North China

Managerial career
- 1950–1951: Bayi Football Team
- 1951–1952: China
- 1955: Central Sports Institute
- * Club domestic league appearances and goals

Li Fenglou (Chinese: 李凤楼; June 15, 1912 – July 31, 1988) was a Chinese footballer and coach. As a player, he represented Zixing Football Team and North China, however he is predominantly remembered for being the People's Republic of China's first football coach as well as being the Chairman of the Chinese Football Association.

== Playing career ==
Li Fenglou was born in Tongzhou, Zhili (now part of Beijing) and would graduate from the Fu Jen Catholic University where he would become a sports teacher. While he was at the university he would take part in the football at the Chinese 5th national games. After he finished University he would play for the Zixing Football Team and then in 1936 he would get noticed to play for the recently formed North China team, which saw the Beijing and Tianjin team to play in a series of friendlies against Japan.

== Management career ==
When the friendlies finished Li would return to teaching at Fu Jen Catholic University where he grew a reputation as an excellent coach. He would soon attract the attentions of the top Chinese army football team Bayi Football Team in 1950. His work with the army team would soon see him offered the China national football team position. China were allowed entry for the Football at the 1952 Summer Olympics held in Finland. Unfortunately the Chinese delegation was delayed and they missed the entire competition, nevertheless the Finland national football team would still greet Li and the Chinese team with a friendly game on August 4, 1952, making it People's Republic of China's official first game, which ended in a 4–0 defeat. His reign as manager for the national team would soon end in 1952, however by 1955 he would be coaching the Central Sports Institute in their successful title winning campaign.

By 1956 Li would start to move away from management so he could concentrate working for the Chinese government in helping develop sports within China. He took a position with the All-China Sports Federation and served as deputy director for them before taking on the chairmen position within the Chinese Football Association in 1979 until 1985 when he was fired after China were knocked out of qualifying for the 1986 FIFA World Cup. On July 31, 1988, after several years out of football Li died of illness in Beijing at the age of seventy-six.
