= Nian Weisi =

Chinese footballer and manager

Personal information
- Date of birth: 11 May 1933 (age 93)
- Place of birth: Beijing, China

Senior career*
Years	Team	Apps	(Gls)
1951–1960	North China		

International career
1955–1957	China	7	(2)

Managerial career
- 1963: China
- 1963–1965: Hunan
- 1965–1976: China
- 1978: China
- 1980: China
- 1985–1986: China
Medal record
Men's football
Representing China (as manager)
AFC Asian Cup
Bronze medal – third place	1976
- * Club domestic league appearances and goals

Nian Weisi (Chinese: 年维泗; born 11 May 1933) is a Chinese football manager and former player.

As a player he played for the North China team as well as the China national team before he moved into management. As a coach he intermittently managed the Chinese national team for over twenty years. Since retiring from professional football, he became the Chinese Football Association president in April 1988 and held on to this appointment until he retired in August 1994. He briefly came out of retirement with his participation and promotion of the 2008 Summer Olympics.

== Playing career ==
Nian Weisi was born in Beijing. Having started his career with the Beijing team he was given the chance to be included in the newly formed North China team when the Beijing team and Tianjin team merged to play in the first fully national league in 1951. In March 1952 he was considered a very promising young player and was selected into the national soccer training center despite already still being in school. Nevertheless, he would still develop as a footballer and was considered good enough to study in Hungary with the Chinese youth football team in April 1954. By 1957 Nian Weisi would be promoted to the senior side and take part in China's unsuccessful 1958 FIFA World Cup qualification. His footballer career however was cut short on 25 July 1959, when he sustained a broken left leg.

== Managerial career ==
After his retirement he would begin his management career when he was given the chance to manage the national youth team. By 1963 he would quickly get promoted to the senior team, however with China not entering the Fifa World Cup and the Hunan football team looking for a new manager Nian Weisi would leave the national team. Nian Weisi would return in 1965, despite having China isolated from playing any major competitions; however, he did not let this haggle over the teams individual performances and always made brave team selections. When China started to reopened itself to the world, Nian Weisi had built a team that was able to compete in the 1976 AFC Asian Cup, where he led them to third in the competition, though he would leave shortly afterwards.

He returned once more in 1978 to help China in the 1978 Asian Games, where he once again helped them to another third position and again left after the competition. In 1979, he was given a position at the Chinese Soccer Association; however, Nian Weisi would find himself returning to the national team again in 1980 to help them for the 1980 AFC Asian Cup. For the final time Nian Weisi was brought in to help China qualify for the world cup; however, his reign was to be unsuccessful as China crashed out in the group stages in qualifying. He would once more return to the Chinese Soccer Association and in 1989 he became president.
