= Chinese Football Association =

Governing body of association football in China

AFC
- Founded: 1924 (as former Republic of China); 1955 (as People's Republic of China)
- FIFA affiliation: 1931
- AFC affiliation: 1974
- EAFF affiliation: 2002
- Communist Party Committee Secretary: Zhang Jiasheng
- Deputy Party Secretary (and President): Song Kai
- Website: www.thecfa.cn

Chinese Football Association
- Simplified Chinese: 中国足球协会
- Traditional Chinese: 中國足球協會
Transcriptions
Standard Mandarin
- Hanyu Pinyin: Zhōngguó Zúqiú Xiéhuì
- Wade–Giles: Chungkuo Tsuch'iu Hsieh-hui
- IPA: [ʈʂʊ́ŋ kwǒ tsǔ tɕʰjǒʊ ɕjě xwêɪ]

The Chinese Football Association (Chinese: 中国足球协会; pinyin: Zhōngguó Zúqiú Xiéhuì), abbreviated as CFA (Chinese: 中国足协; pinyin: Zhōngguó Zúxié), is the governing body for association football, beach soccer and futsal in the People's Republic of China (Mainland China). The CFA organizes the men's and women's national teams and administers the country's professional leagues as well as organizing the national knockout cup competition Chinese FA Cup. As members of East Asian Football Federation its national teams are eligible for the East Asian Football Championship and the country's membership in AFC allows teams to participate in that organizations club and national team competitions. China is also a member of FIFA and is therefore eligible to play in the World Cup.

== History ==
Founded in 1924, the Chinese Football Association became members of FIFA in 1931 and competed internationally at the 1936 and 1948 Olympics. Following the end of Chinese Civil War in 1949, both the People's Republic of China (PRC) and the Republic of China (ROC) contended to be the sole legitimate government of "China", and claimed sovereignty over both mainland China and Taiwan. On 14 June 1952, FIFA acknowledged that the CFA on mainland China, not the Republic of China Football Association (ROCFA) located on Taiwan, was the recognized authority over Chinese Football with their membership dating to 1931. Taiwan was admitted as a member of FIFA in June 1954 over the objections of the CFA and the PRC government at the 29th FIFA Congress in Bern.

The Chinese Football Association's objection to Taiwan's membership in FIFA continued with the organization offering proposals for the island's expulsion at the next two FIFA Congresses in 1956 and 1958. Then on 8 July 1958 the CFA notified FIFA of its withdraw as a member of the federation. FIFA stipulations at the time required that once a withdraw be announced it must be confirmed three months later by registered mail. With no such confirmation received, FIFA's Executive Committee still considered ACAF a member but all inquiries to the CFA or PRC were returned stating China no longer recognized FIFA's authority. At a meeting of FIFA's Executive Committee in late October 1959, Victor Granatkin, the USSR Vice President of FIFA, reported that from his discussions with Chinese authorities, the CFA would only rescind its withdraw after the expulsion of Taiwan from the organization. The situation was resolved at FIFA's 42nd Congress when the Executive Committee's compromise proposal to allow Taiwan to remain a member of FIFA under the name Chinese Taipei Football Association and to readmit the Chinese Football Association was passed on 7 July 1980.

In 1992 the CFA under the auspices of the General Administration of Sport of China released plan to improve the quality of football in the nation. The plan included hiring Klaus Schlappner to coach the national team and as a technical adviser for the football federation and had the stated goals of attempting to enter the 1994 World Cup, to be among the top five teams in the 1995 Women's World Cup, qualify for the 1996 Olympic Games, represent Asia in the 1998 World Cup, to reach the quarter-finals of the 2000 Olympic Games, and to be among the top four teams in the 2002 World Cup. Then in 1998, the then-Minister of Sports announced a ten-year plan for Chinese football with goals to reach the World Cup finals and become one of the top sixteen teams in the world by 2002.

In 2015, General Secretary of the Chinese Communist Party Xi Jinping set an aggressive plan to make the Chinese men's national team the number one footballing nation in Asia by 2030 and the world's number one by 2050.

In 2022, Chinese Communist Party (CCP) officials launched an anti-corruption probe resulting in eight footballing officials being investigated for "suspected of violations of discipline and law". In August 2024, former CCP Committee Secretary of the CFA, Du Zhaocai, pleaded guilty to accepting more than US$6.1 million in bribes. On 10 September 2024, CFA banned 38 players, including former nationals, Jin Jingdao, Guo Tianyu, and five officials for life over allegations of match-fixing and other forms of corruption. Other players and officials were also given shorter five years bans. Nine Chinese Super League clubs were also punished with point deductions for the 2026 Chinese Super League and fines. The clubs were docked between five and ten points.

== National teams ==
=== Men's national team ===
The China national football team (simplified Chinese: 中国国家足球队; traditional Chinese: 中國國家足球隊; pinyin: Zhōngguó guójiā zúqiú duì represents the People's Republic of China in international association football. Since rejoining the international football community, the team achieved their highest FIFA ranking of 37 in December 1998.

The men's national team has won the EAFF East Asian Cup in 2005 and 2010, was runner-up at the AFC Asian Cup in 1984 and 2004, and made its sole FIFA World Cup appearance in 2002, losing all matches without scoring a goal.

=== Women's national team ===
The China women's national football team (Chinese: 中国国家女子足球队; pinyin: Zhōngguó Guójiā Nǚzǐ Zúqiú Duì), represents the People's Republic of China in international association football. The team is colloquially referred to as "Zhōngguó Nǚzú" (Chinese: 中国女足, and has been nicknamed the "Steel Roses" (Chinese: 钢玫瑰). The team achieved their highest FIFA ranking of 4 in 2003.

The women's team has won AFC Women's Asian Cup a record 9 times in 1986, 1989, 1991, 1993, 1995, 1997, 1999, 2006, and 2022, and were runners-up two times in 2003 and 2008. They were also runners-up at the 1999 FIFA Women's World Cup.

== Professional leagues ==
Professional football in China is organized by the CFA and currently consists of four professional leagues organized in a hierarchical format with promotion and relegation between the leagues. The Chinese Football Association Super League is the top flight of professional football in China after a rebranding of the National Football Jia A League in 2004. Also founded in 2004, the Chinese Football Association China League is the second tier of professional football. The Chinese Football Association Division Two League, founded in 1956 as the second level, the league was demoted to the third level in 1989. The Chinese Football Association Member Association Champions League makes up the fourth level of football with relegated teams playing to league run by the regional CFA member football association.

=== Men ===
Level	League(s) / Division(s)
1	Chinese Super League; 16 clubs
	↓ 2 clubs ↑ 2 clubs
2	China League One; 16 clubs
	↓ 2 clubs ↑ 2 clubs
3	China League Two; 20 clubs
	↓ 4 clubs ↑ 4 clubs
4	Chinese Football Association Member Association Champions League; 56 clubs

=== Women ===
Chinese Women's Super League since 1997.

== Member associations ==
As of 2015, there are total 44 member associations directly affiliated to CFA. The members are:

- Anhui Football Association
- Beijing Football Association
- Changchun Football Association
- Chengdu Football Association
- Chongqing Football Association
- Dalian Football Association
- Fujian Football Association
- Gansu Football Association
- Guangdong Football Association
- Guangxi Football Association
- Guangzhou Football Association
- Guizhou Football Association
- Hainan Football Association
- Hebei Football Association
- Heilongjiang Football Association
- Henan Football Association
- Hubei Football Association
- Hunan Football Association
- Inner Mongolia Football Association
- Jiangsu Football Association
- Jiangxi Football Association
- Jilin Football Association

- Kunming Football Association
- Liaoning Football Association
- Nanjing Football Association
- Ningxia Football Association
- Qingdao Football Association
- Qinghai Football Association
- Shaanxi Football Association
- Shandong Football Association
- Shanghai Football Association
- Shanxi Football Association
- Shenyang Football Association
- Shenzhen Football Association
- Sichuan Football Association
- Tianjin Football Association
- Tibet Football Association
- Wuhan Football Association
- Xiamen Football Association
- Xi'an Football Association
- Xinjiang Football Association
- Yanbian Football Association
- Yunnan Football Association
- Zhejiang Football Association

== Leadership ==
=== Current ===
Name	Position	Source
(China) Zhang Jiasheng	Committee Secretary of the Communist Party	
(China) Song Kai	Deputy Party Secretary and President	
(China) Sun Wen	Vice President	
(China) Yuan Yongqing	Deputy Party Secretary and General Secretary	
(China) Yang Xu	2nd Vice President	
(China) Xu Jiren	3rd Vice President	
n/a	Technical Director	
(Croatia) Branko Ivanković	Team Coach (Men's)	
(Australia) Ante Milicic	Team Coach (Women's)	
(China) Sun Baojie	Chairperson of the Referees Committee	
(China) Mao Heming	Referee Coordinator	

=== List of past presidents and vice presidents ===
President

- Huang Zhong (黄中) (1955–1979)
- Li Fenglou (1979–1985)
- Yuan Weimin (1985–1989)
- Nian Weisi (1989–1992)
- Yuan Weimin (1992–2014)
- Cai Zhenhua (2014–2019)
- Chen Xuyuan (2019–2023)
- Song Kai (2023–)

First Vice-President

- Sun Baorong (孙宝荣) (1989–1992)
- Wang Junsheng (王俊生) (1992–2000)
- Yan Shiduo (阎世铎) (2000–2004)
- Xie Yalong (谢亚龙) (2005–2008)
- Nan Yong (南勇) (2009)
- Wei Di (韦迪) (2010–2013)
- Zhang Jian (张剑) (2013–2019)
- Du Zhaocai (杜兆才) (2019–2023)
- Sun Wen (孙雯) (2023-present)
