= Emilio Pacheco =

Filipino football player and coach

Emilio "Lolo" Pacheco
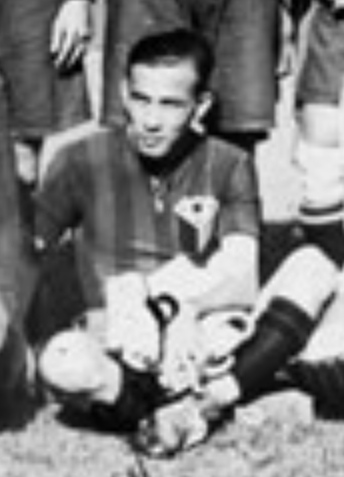
- Emilio "Lolo" Pacheco in the 1930 Far Eastern Games

Personal information
- Birth name: Emilio Pacheco
- Position: Forward

Senior career*
Years	Team	Apps	(Gls)
1925	Bohemian		
1930	Turba Salvaje		
1931	Columbian		

International career
1925–1930	Philippines		

Managerial career
- 1967: Philippines
Medal record
Philippines
Far Eastern Championship Games
Silver medal – second place	1923 Osaka	Team
Silver medal – second place	1925 Manila	Team
Bronze medal – third place	1930 Tokyo	Team
- * Club domestic league appearances and goals

Emilio Pacheco, nicknamed "Lolo" was a Filipino international football player and manager. In his playing career, he was part of clubs such as Bohemian Sporting Club, Turba Salvaje and Philippine Columbian. As a coach, he led the Philippines national football team.

== Club career ==
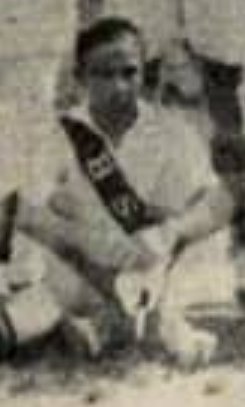
Emilio "Lolo" Pacheco in a Bohemian SC kit

Emilio "Lolo" Pacheco settled at Bohemian S.C. in the 1920s where he played as a forward and was paired alongside teammates with the likes of Virgilio Lobregat and Jose Villareal to lead the offense. After his stint as a Bohemian, he then joined another football club based in Manila named Turba Salvaje where he played until 1930. The year after, in 1931, Pacheco and Emilio Heredia joined Jesus Lacson Suarez in the Philippine Columbian football-team.

== International career ==
Lolo Pacheco was called up to represent the Philippines in the 1923 Far Eastern Games in Osaka where he and his teammates were involved in a brawl against China's players and part of the crowd, after losing 0-2. The fight was stopped thanks to the police who managed to establish order and the two sides agreed to finish the game. It ended in a 0-3 defeat but the next match against Japan, the Filipinos were able to walk away with a 2-1 win and secure a silver medal. Pacheco took also part in the Far East Games in 1925 held in Manila in which, once again, brought home a second silver medal. He missed out on the 1927 edition and the 1930 edition of the Far East Games in Tokyo were his last. Pacheco scored the two goals in the 2–7 defeat against Japan and the Philippines finished third in the tournament after also losing to China.

== Managerial career ==
Pacheco led the Philippines National Football Team in 1967 as its head coach at the Asian qualifiers for the men's football event of the 1968 Summer Olympics. He was then succeeded by the Spanish coach Juan Cutillas in late 1967.

== Personal life ==
He was the father of another Filipino sports legend, Eduardo Alvir Pacheco, also known as Eddie Pacheco, who stood out both in football and basketball.

== Honors ==
Philippine national football team

- Far Eastern Championship Games:
  - (Silver medal) 1923, 1925
  - (Bronze medal) 1930
