= Eduardo Yrezabal =

Filipino footballer

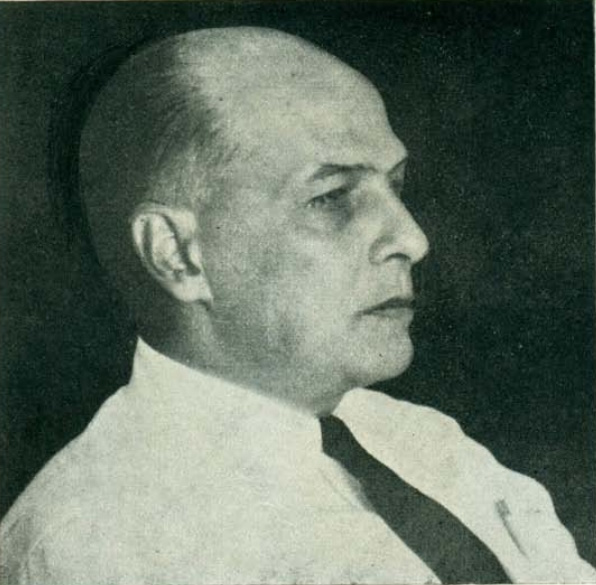

Personal information
- Birth name: Eduardo Yrezabal y Azpiazu
- Date of birth: August 19, 1899
- Place of birth: Captaincy General of the Philippines
- Place of death: Philippines

Youth career
- De La Salle University

Senior career*
| Years | Team | Apps | (Gls) |
| 1917-1925 | Bohemian | | |

International career
| 1917–1925 | Philippines | | |
Medal record
Philippines
Far Eastern Championship Games
| Silver medal – second place | 1917 Tokyo | Team |
| Silver medal – second place | 1919 Manila | Team |
| Silver medal – second place | 1925 Manila | Team |
- * Club domestic league appearances and goals

Eduardo Yrezabal Sr. (born Eduardo Yrezabal y Azpiazu) was a Filipino international football player who, at club level, played for Bohemian SC in the 1910s to the 1920s and also represented the Philippine Islands football team in the Far Eastern Championship Games. After football he served as an official at the highest of ranks at the Elizalde & Co. Inc. and was president of the Elizalde Stamp Club.

== Club career ==
=== Bohemian Sporting Club ===
Yrezabal joined, reigning champions, Bohemian Sporting Club in the middle years of the 1910s combining with the likes of Paulino Alcantara and Virgilio Lobregat. He and the Bohemians consolidated their strength and went on to accomplish two National Championships in 1917 and 1918, completing a historic four-peat. Another remarkable three-peat occurred and saw him to be one of the protagonists of the team, winning the titles in 1920, 1921 and 1922. The Championship, during those years, in the 1920s, featured foreign clubs that were able to win the title above the Bohemians who were also weakened by the fact that some of the old guard were past their best or left the club. Yrezabal would finish his career at Bohemian with a trophy cabinet of five National Philippine Championships won.

== International career ==
=== Far Eastern Championship Games ===
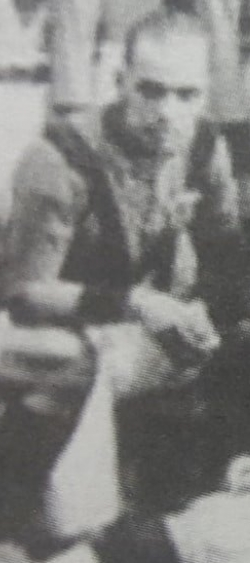
Eduardo Yrezabal in the 1925 Far eastern games

His performances at Bohemian would earn him a spot in the Philippine Islands football team and participated in the 1917 Tokyo Far Eastern Games. That year the Filipino team won their biggest game by margin, outscoring Japan by 15 goals to 2. However Yrezabal and team couldn't repeat themselves against China and ended up with a silver medal.

In the next edition, in 1919 in Manila he was present in all three games against China at the Nozaleda Park. The home team saw themselves coming up short against their rivals. After losing the first game and then winning the second to take it to a third game, the Filipinos were close to win the gold after leading with one goal at half-time but came up short as the Chinese were able to turn the game around resulting in a silver for the Philippines and the second for Yrezabal.

He didn't participate in the 1921 and 1923 editions of the Far Eastern Championship Games but was able to make it one last time at the 1925 Games once again in Manila. The 30.000 at Wallace Field saw his and Joaquín "Chacho" López last games at the tournament but, after winning comfortably 4–0 against Japan, they saw defeat again to the hands of China and received a silver medal at the final whistle.

== Personal life ==
He was born to Adolfo Yrezabal y Madariaga and Felipa Azpiazu y Elizalde. He was married to Maria Echevarria y Egido with whom he started a family. One of his nephew was Ramón "Monchu" Echevarría, also an important football figure who was mostly known for leading the Philippines to an upset against Japan and taking the team in the quarter finals of the 1958 Asian Games. Another relative of his, one of his grandsons, is the current owner of Yrezabal & Co., also named Eduardo Yrezabal.

After taking his education at De La Salle University and during his time as a footballer, Yrezabal also worked as a clerk at the Elizalde & Co. Inc. but worked his way up and served in different executive capacities. He then became one of the highest-ranking officials of the company. In 1939, alongside other employees, he organized the Elizalde Stamp Club and served as its president as well as the managing editor of the Elizalde Stamp Journal. The club was formed to free the employees from the stress of work and to get more people involved in philately. It was a hobby of his with collectibles of Spain and Philippines as his specialties. He made former Bohemian teammate and friend Jesús Cacho an honorary member of the club as he was the most avid of collectors. His other passions and favorite sports were obviously football but also golf and became member of the Casino Español de Manila, Los Tamaraos Polo Club, and Wack Wack Golf and Country Club.

== Honors ==
Bohemian S.C.

- United States Philippines Championship (5): 1917, 1918, 1920, 1921, 1922

Philippine national football team

- Far Eastern Championship Games (Silver medal): 1917, 1919, 1925
