= Alberto Villareal =

Alberto Villareal may refer to:

- Alberto Villareal (footballer, died 2017) (1933/34–2017), Filipino footballer
- Alberto Villareal (footballer, born 1896) (1896–1930), Filipino footballer and coach
