= Fernando Villareal =

Filipino footballer

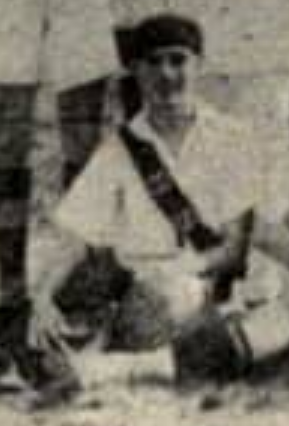

Personal information
- Birth name: Fernando Villarreal y Santa Coloma
- Date of birth: March 26, 1898
- Place of birth: Manila, Captaincy General of the Philippines
- Date of death: September 23, 1963 (aged 65)
- Place of death: Philippines
- Position: Midfielder

Senior career*
Years	Team	Apps	(Gls)
1921-1927	Bohemian		

International career
1921-1925	Philippines		
Medal record
Philippines
Far Eastern Championship Games
Silver medal – second place	1921 Shanghai	Team
Silver medal – second place	1923 Osaka	Team
Silver medal – second place	1925 Manila	Team
- * Club domestic league appearances and goals

Fernando Villarreal y Santa Coloma (March 26, 1898 - September 23, 1963) was a Filipino international footballer and was one of the pre-war legends of the game. He played as a Midfielder during his time and while never scaling over the 105 lbs mark, he was considered to be one of the best players in the Philippines. He represented, at club level, Bohemian S.C. and, at international level, the Philippine Island football team in the Far Eastern Championship Games.

== Club career ==
=== Bohemian Sporting Club ===
Fernando Villareal was the first to join Alberto's side, Bohemian Sporting Club, among their brothers. Fernando was known for his confidence in his game while covering the midfield playing as a half-back and helped the club retain the title in 1921 and 1922 completing the club's second three-peat. Just as both Villareals were considered two of the country's best, Fernando and Alberto were also joined by their other two brothers Jose and Angel forming and completing a side that carried on the club's storied prowess. Consequently, Fernando and his brothers, all together, were part of the selection of the National team for the first time in 1925 but also saw Alberto retire from playing football. The Villareal trio, however, were able to continue to display their talents and helped the Bohemians lift a long-awaited National Championship in 1927 after five years.

== International career ==
The half back, thanks to his skills, was rewarded with call-ups from the Philippine Island football team throughout the 1920s and represented the country in the Far Eastern Championship Games for a total of three occasions.

He got his first selection for the Filipino squad in the 1921 Far East Games in Shanghai, in which he got his first victory with the National team against Japan with a score of 3–1 after conceding first. In the team Alberto was also present but the two brothers had to be content and return home with a silver medal after losing the crucial game against China 0–1. Fernando, as well with Alberto, was selected by the P. I. manager Manuel Amechazurra and took part again at 1923 edition in Osaka. The team lacked the presence of six players due to injuries and were substituted by some youth college players. The first game resulted in a decisive one but also violent as well as a fight broke out between the Filipinos and the Chinese with part of the crowd that was also involved. The match at the end finished with Fernando and his team being defeated by China by three goals to none and had to settle with a silver medal after edging out Japan by 2–1.

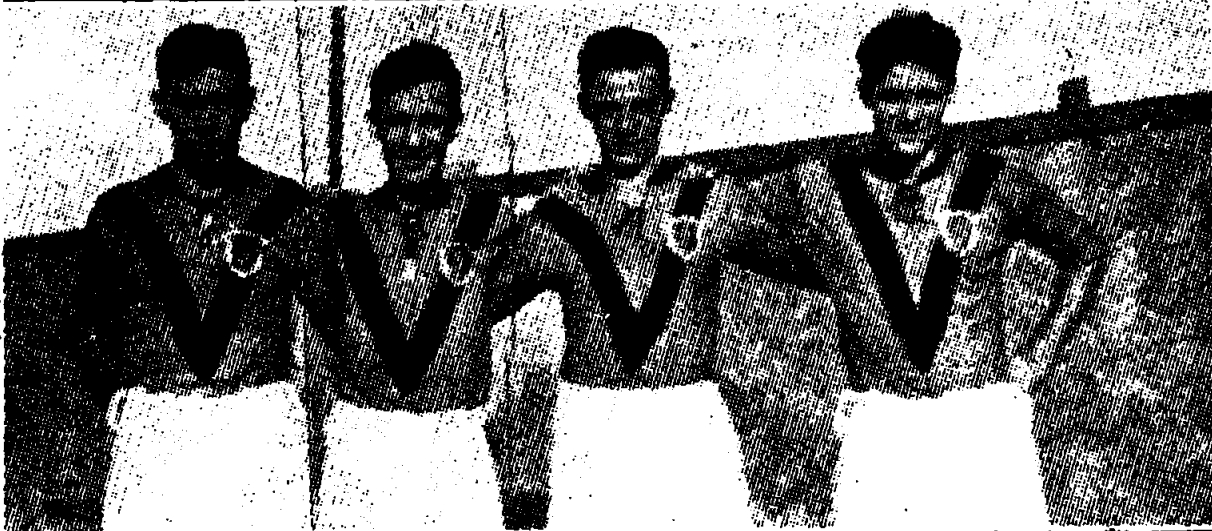
Alberto, Fernando, Jose and Angel at the Far East Games 1925

He gave his last contribution to the National Team in the edition after two years later but this time was accompanied by all of his brothers playing at Bohemian Alberto, Jose and Angel. All of them took part at the 1925 Manila Games and saw themselves get a win against Japan four goals to zero but once again even with the addition of the brothers still lost against China and picked up a silver.

== Personal life ==
Fernando was born in Manila and was the second of seven children of Carlos Ramon Fernando Villarreal y Moras and Doña Carmen Santa Coloma y Navarro. Among them were his sisters Ines Villarreal Y Santa Coloma, born in 1899 and Salud Villarreal y Santa Coloma born in 1901 added to his brothers Alberto, Jose, Angeling and Carlos. All of his brothers were footballers and were stars of the red sashed team, except Carlos who was also an exceptional player, as well as a great amateur boxer, but played for other teams with his last being Club Filipino before his injury. Fernando married Natalia Morales Y Lozada with whom he had a family and had eight children. One of his sons, named Fernando Villareal Jr. and nicknamed “Tito” was a footballer who played for Ateneo, YCO Athletic Club and Ysmael. He was a great player too and was described as a gazzelle-like athlete. Furthermore, his nephews, Jose's sons, Alberto “Albert” Villareal y Garcia, Jose “Joey” Villareal y Garcia, Rafael “Raffy” Villareal y Garcia and Juan “Juancho” Villareal y Garcia were also football players and played around the same era as his son in the 1950s and 1960s. During his best years, Fernando Sr as an olympic half-back and as one of the best players in this country, like his brothers, had daily job and worked as an Insurance agent.

== Honors ==
Bohemian S.C.

- United States Philippines Championship (3): 1921, 1922, 1927

Philippine national football team

- Far Eastern Championship Games: (Silver medal) 1921, 1923, 1925
