= Angeling Villareal =

Filipino footballer

Angel Villareal
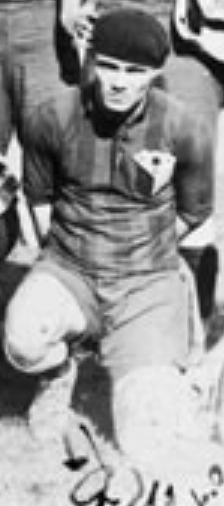

Personal information
- Birth name: Angeling Villarreal y Santa Coloma
- Place of birth: Manila, Captaincy General of the Philippines
- Place of death: Philippines
- Positions: Defender; forward

Senior career*
Years	Team	Apps	(Gls)
1925–1927	Bohemian		
1930	Turba Salvaje		

International career
1925–1930	Philippines		

Managerial career
- 1930: University of the Philippines
Medal record
Philippines
Far Eastern Championship Games
Silver medal – second place	1925 Manila	Team
Bronze medal – third place	1930 Tokyo	Team
- * Club domestic league appearances and goals

Angeling Villareal (Note: Philipinized version of the Spanish surname) (born Angeling Villarreal y Santa Coloma) or simply shortened to Angel Villareal was a Filipino international footballer and coach. He was a Defender (as a full-back) and also played as a left inside forward. He played, at club level, for Bohemian SC and for Turba Salvaje. At international level he represented the Philippine Island Football Team at the Far Eastern Championship Games. He retired while young to become a manager and coached the University of the Philippines football team.

== Sporting career ==
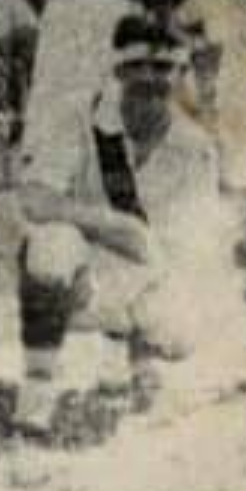
Angeling Villareal in a Bohemian SC kit

Angeling, the youngest of the Villareal brothers, along with Jose, joined Alberto and Fernando'side Bohemian Sporting Club in the 1920s. He was a utility player who could have played on the attack as a left-in and by comparison to his brothers, who played mostly in the midfield and on the front, he could have also played in the defense as a full-back. Thanks to his versatility, Angel, as well as the other Villareals, was called up by the Philippine Island Football Team to represent the nation in the 1925 Far Eastern Championship Games in Manila. It was his last participation in the tournament and the team, after defeating Japan by 4 goals to nil, could not repeat the feat in the crucial game against China, leaving the team with a silver medal. Fernando and Peping remained at Bohemian and alongside them Angel was able to win the Philippine National Championship in 1927. Angeling then moved from Bohemian to play for Turba Salvaje and was once again selected to represent the national team in the 1930 Far East Games in Tokyo, where they finished third. After returning to Manila, he ended his playing career to become a manager and coached the U. P. football team, formerly a team that also Alberto coached.

== Early life ==
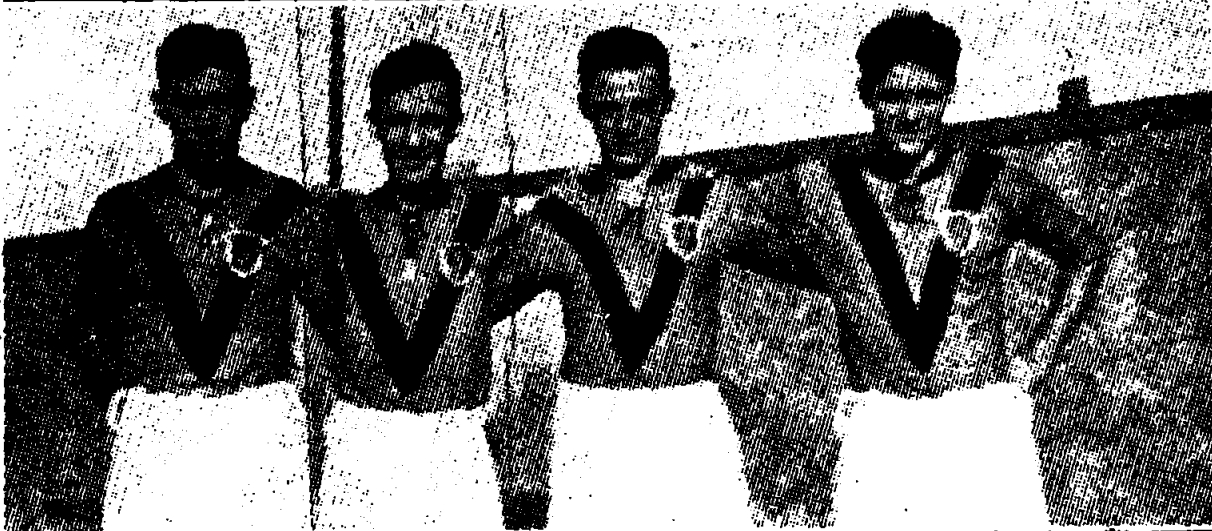
Alberto, Fernando, Jose and Angel at the Far East Games 1925

Angeling was the youngest child of Carlos Ramon Fernando Villarreal y Moras and Doña Carmen Santa Coloma y Navarro. His sisters were Ines Villarreal y Santa Coloma, born in 1899, and Salud Villarreal y Santa Coloma, born in 1901, while his brothers were Alberto, Fernando, Jose and Carlos. During and after football, Angeling was employed in a banking concern.

His nephews Alberto "Albert" Villareal y Garcia, Jose "Joey" Villareal, Rafael "Raffy" Villareal, Juan "Juancho" Villareal y Garcia (Jose's sons) and Fernando "Tito" Villareal Jr. (Fernando's son) all played in the 1950s and 1960s and formed a second generation of Villareal brothers in Philippine football.

== Honors ==
=== Bohemian S.C. ===
- United States Philippines Championship: 1927

=== Philippine national football team ===
- Far Eastern Championship Games:
  - (Silver medal) 1925
  - (Bronze medal) 1930
