= Marcelino Gálatas =

Spanish footballer

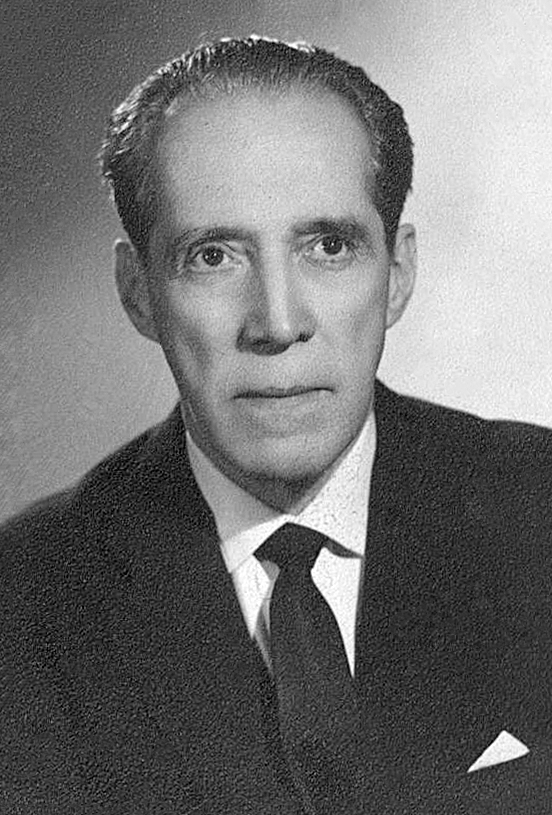
- Marcelino Gálatas in 1962

Personal information
- Full name: Marcelino Mamerto Gálatas Rentería
- Date of birth: 2 April 1903
- Place of birth: Manila, Philippines
- Date of death: 8 April 1994 (aged 91)
- Place of death: Benalmádena, Spain
- Positions: Inside forward; midfielder

Senior career*
Years	Team	Apps	(Gls)
1920–1921	Athletic Bilbao	1	(0)
1921–1923	SD Deusto	18	(>)
1923–1927	Real Sociedad	53	(18)
- → Athletic de Madrid
1927–1928	Athletic de Madrid	22	(4)
1930	La Carlota		
1931	Isabela Sporting Club		
1931	Athletic de Iloilo		

International career
1927	Spain	1	(0)
- * Club domestic league appearances and goals

Marcelino Mamerto Gálatas Rentería (2 April 1903 – 8 April 1994), nicknamed "Chelín", was a Spanish international footballer, born in the Philippines, who played as an inside forward and midfielder for Athletic Bilbao, SD Deusto, Real Sociedad and Atlético Madrid during his time in Spain.

== Early life and education ==
Gálatas was born in Manila to a wealthy family of Basque origin who established their businesses in the Philippines. His parents encouraged him and his brothers to study in Spain, and Gálatas studied for a degree in industrial engineering in both Bilbao and Madrid.

== Club career ==
=== Early career ===
Gálatas began his football career with Athletic Bilbao, making an unofficial appearance for the first-team at the age of 16. He made his official debut for the first team on 20 February 1921 against SD Deusto in the last game of the 1920–21 Biscay Championship. In doing so, he came both the first Filipino and first Asian-born player to represent the club.

Gálatas then spent two seasons with SD Deusto.

=== Real Sociedad ===
Gálatas attracted attention from numerous Basque teams, including his former team Athletic Club, as well Club Atlético Osasuna, Tolosa CF, Club Deportivo Esperanza, and Real Sociedad. Gálatas signed for Sociedad, having family connections in the city He made his official first-team debut on 23 September 1923 in a 4–2 defeat against eventual 1923–24 champions Real Unión. Gálatas played all 6 games and scored 3 goals.

In the 1924–25 season he played 13 league matches, scoring 4 goals, as the club won its third Gipuzkoan Championship. The victory allowed them to take part in the 1925 Copa del Rey where they lost in the group stage against eventual finalist Arenas Club de Getxo. Chelín in his first cup competition collected 4 appearances and 1 goal.

During the 1925–26 season Gálatas appeared in 14 games in the championship with 5 goals, and 1 goal in 5 games in the national cup. Gálatas' final season concluded with his second Championship with the club, in which he scored 3 goals in 7 games, as well as 1 goal in 5 games in the 1927 Copa del Rey.

In total, Gálatas had 53 games and 18 goals for the club in official competitions.

During his time with Sociedad, the club management picked him up with a white Hudson convertible to take him to San Sebastián from Bilbao, and reserved him a sleeping car when he was in Madrid to complete his studies.

=== Athletic de Madrid ===
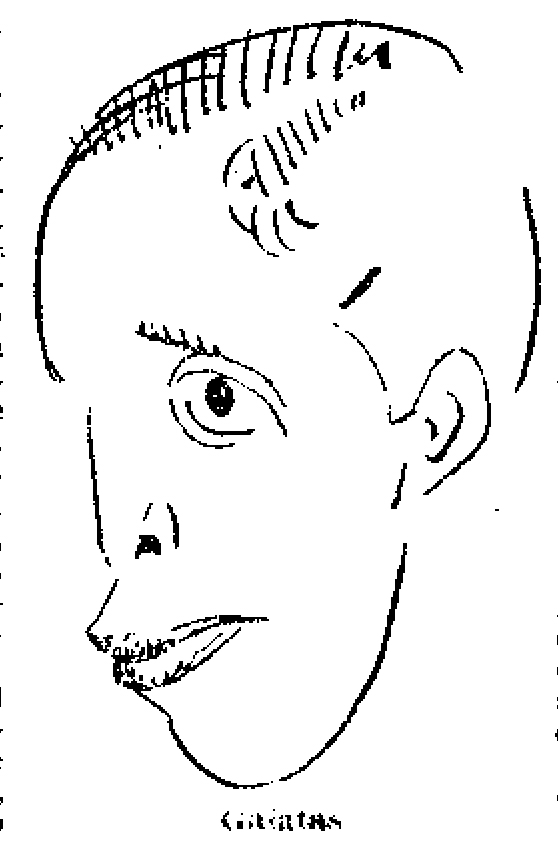
An illustration of Chelín by Eduardo Teus, when writing about the victory of Athletic de Madrid over Real Madrid for the 1927–28 Campeonato Regional Centro in the El Sol (Madrid) newspaper.

During his time at Real Sociedad, whilst studying in Madrid, Gálatas was allowed to play some friendly matches for Athletic de Madrid. He officially signed for the club for the 1927–28 season, making his debut in a 2–0 victory in the Campeonato Regional Centro on 25 September 1927 at the Estadio Metropolitano de Madrid. Gálatas scored his first official goal for the club in the 66th minute of a 6–0 win over Unión Sporting Club. During the season, Gálatas played a total of 22 matches, scoring 4 goals.

=== Return to the Philippines ===
After the season ended, Gálatas was close to joining Celta Vigo for a tour to South America.

However, after obtaining his degree, he returned to the Philippines with his brother Manuel to visit their family. He captained La Carlota, a strong team which included Eduardo Yrezabal.

For the next season Marcelino represented both Isabela and Iloilo City.

Gálatas then joined Athletic, reuniting with all of his brothers.

== International career ==
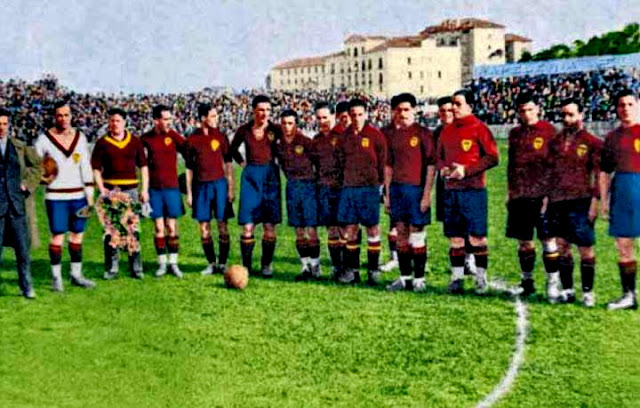
The formation of La Roja on 17 April 1927.

Gálatas made his first and only international football appearance for Spain on 17 April 1927, playing a friendly against Switzerland at the Estadio El Sardinero.

After his return to the Philippines, there were calls by fans and in the media for Gálatas to join the Philippines national football team for the 1930 Far Eastern Championship Games.

== Personal life ==
Marcelino was born to Francisco Bernardo Gálatas Carril and María Del Carmen Marichu de Rentería y Gregorio-Díez who were of Basque origin, from Gipuzkoa. He had 5 siblings, and married and had two children. His daughter, an author and concert pianist in Spain, wrote a biography about him called Con Chelín Gálatas todavía, which was published by Real Sociedad in 2004.

== See also ==
- Athletic Bilbao signing policy
- List of Spain international footballers born outside Spain
