= Carlos Villareal =

Filipino footballer and boxer

Carlos Villarreal
Personal information
- Birth name: Carlos Villarreal y Santa Coloma
- Date of birth: 1903
- Place of birth: Manila, Captaincy General of the Philippines
- Date of death: 1966 (aged 62–63)
- Place of death: Philippines

Senior career*
Years	Team	Apps	(Gls)
1923	Club Filipino		
- * Club domestic league appearances and goals

Carlos Villareal (Note: Philipinized version of the Spanish surname) (born Carlos Villarreal y Santa Coloma; 1903–1966) was a Filipino football player and amateur boxer. He was active and at his best in those sports until 1923, before he suffered a fractured leg injury.

== Sporting career ==
Carlos, unlike his brothers, didn't play for the red sashed club but also did not have the opportuninty as he suffered a career ending injury that kept him out of any sort of sporting activities in 1923. Although, his brief career, that same year, while playing for the football team of Club Filipino he showed that he was as well a skilled player like the other Villareals and earned a call up to represent the Philippine Island selection in the Far Eastern Championship Games in Osaka. He could not make it as he was injured prior to the start of the tournament. He was also a prominent boxer and was one of the best known amateurs in the country in 1922, and when he recovered, even with little discomforts from his leg, he returned in the square circle after nine years and tried his best to get into the boxing team for the 1932 Summer Olympics.

== Personal life ==
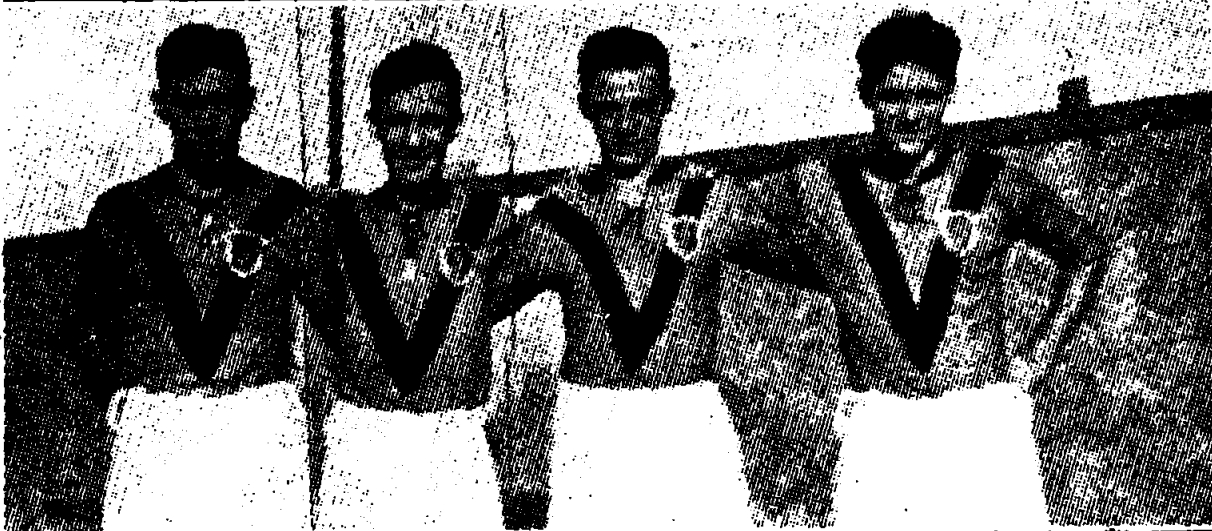
His brothers Alberto, Fernando, Jose and Angel at the Far East Games 1925

He was the sixth of seven children of Carlos Ramon Fernando Villarreal y Moras and Doña Carmen Santa Coloma y Navarro. His sisters were Ines Villarreal Y Santa Coloma, born in 1899 and Salud Villarreal y Santa Coloma born in 1901. His brothers Alberto, Fernando, Jose and Angeling, who were all footballers like him, played for Bohemian SC and were part of the Philippine Island selection for the Football at the Far Eastern Championship Games. During the years he was injured and after he worked as an automobile salesman.

His nephews Alberto “Albert” Villareal y Garcia, Jose “Joey” Villareal y Garcia, Rafael “Raffy” Villareal y Garcia, Juan “Juancho” Villareal y Garcia (Jose's sons) and Fernando “Tito” Villareal Jr. (Fernando's son) were as well footballers and played in the 1950s and 1960s, forming a second generation of Villareal brothers in Philippine football.
