= Jesús Cacho =

Filipino footballer, businessman and philatelist

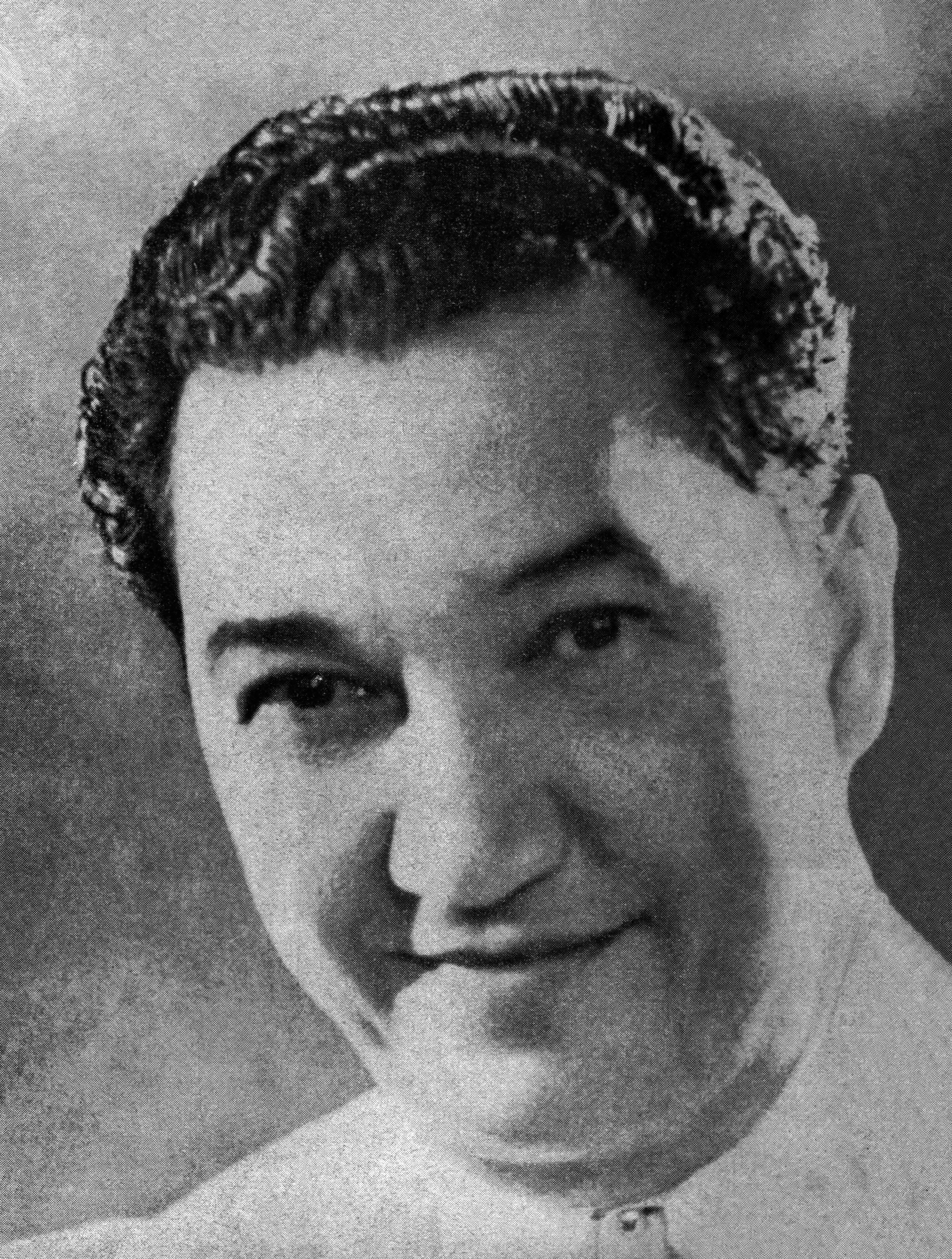

Personal information
- Birth name: Jesús Cacho y Soriano
- Date of birth: 7 November 1894
- Place of birth: Iloilo City, Captaincy General of the Philippines
- Date of death: 5 May 1967 (aged 72)
- Place of death: Manila, Philippines
- Position: Forward

Youth career
- Ateneo de Manila
- Colegio de San Juan de Letran
- University of Santo Tomas

Senior career*
Years	Team	Apps	(Gls)
1912-1919	Bohemian		

International career
1913–1919	Philippines		
Medal record
Philippines
Far Eastern Championship Games
Gold medal – first place	1913 Manila	Team
Silver medal – second place	1915 Shanghai	Team
Silver medal – second place	1919 Manila	Team
- * Club domestic league appearances and goals

Jesús Cacho y Soriano (7 November 1894 – 5 May 1967) was a Filipino international football player who played for Bohemian SC and represented the Philippine Islands football team in the Far Eastern Championship Games. Besides his football career, he was a successful businessman and philatelist.

== Early life and education ==
Jesús Cacho was born in Iloilo on 7 November 1894 to Francisco Tejedor Cacho, a pharmacist from Tiedra, Spain, and Candelaria Ditching Soriano, owner of the Panay Electric Company from 1927. Cacho later moved to Manila, where he studied at the Ateneo de Manila and San Juan de Letran College before transferring to the University of Santo Tomas, where he obtained his B.S.C. and LL.B. degrees.

== Club career ==
=== Bohemian Sporting Club ===
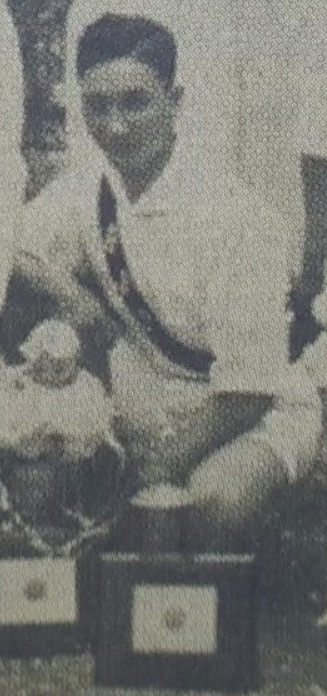
Jesús Cacho in a Bohemian SC kit

Jesús Cacho was one of the early players of Bohemian Sporting Club. He joined shortly after the club was founded and at the beginning of the first National Football Championship in 1911. He achieved recognition as a Philippine champion in 1912 and earned a call-up to participate in the Far Eastern Games, held in Manila the following year. After winning the tournament, he, alongside his Bohemian teammates, faced South China AA for the "Campeonato del Carnaval" and added another continental success to their tally. Cacho also won his second National Title that year, winning a total of three trophies. In 1914, the team was unable to achieve another gold, with the Manila Nomads stripping Bohemian of their title. In the following years, he contributed to the Bohemian team's run of four consecutive Philippine Championships from 1915 to 1918.

== International career ==
=== 1913 Far Eastern Championship Games ===
Cacho, along with many of his Bohemian teammates, was called up to represent the Philippine Islands football team in the first edition of the Far Eastern Games in 1913 held in Manila. The match was against China and ended in favor of the home side with a 2–1 score, securing Cacho's first and only gold medal. During half-time, he and his teammates were accused by the Chinese of not being "natives" of the Philippines and caused the birth of a rivalry between the two teams.

=== 1915 and 1919 Far Eastern Championship Games ===
He represented the country for two more tournaments in the 1915 Shanghai edition and in the 1919 Manila edition, while he did not make it to the 1917 edition. In Shanghai, the Filipinos faced the host team three times. The Islanders were defeated by one goal in the first match, which proved decisive, as the other two games ended in 0–0 and 1–1 draws. This resulted in a silver medal for Cacho and his team.

Cacho made his final appearances for the national team in three tough matches against China, again held in Manila. The first game saw the Filipinos dominate the first half but in the second the game took another turn. China scored two goals to win the game, capitalizing on a mistake by Cacho, who missed the ball while attempting a clearance, and a subsequent error by his Bohemian teammate, goalkeeper German Montserrat. The Filipinos won the second game 2–1, forcing a third match to decide the gold medal. Despite a bright start by Cacho and his teammates, who led at half-time, the Chinese turned the score around, leaving the Philippines with a silver medal.

== Post-football career ==
After his football career, Cacho became a businessman. In addition to co-owning the Panay Electric Company (PECO), he took over the family printing firm, Cacho Hermanos Inc., and held stakes in other organizations. He became the executive manager of Imprenta "Germania" and a director of the Santa Ana Race Club and the Club Filipino.

He was able to combine his work with his philatelic passion. Cacho began collecting stamps during his time as a young footballer, and he went on to become the president of the two national philatelic associations, the Asociacion Filatelica de Filipinas and the Philippine Air Mail Society. He won the Grand Award at the Far Eastern Philatelic Exhibition which was the first international philatelic show held in the country, and was the president of the First Philippine Airmail Exhibition, held in February 1939.

Cacho became an honorary member of the Elizalde Stamp Club when the Elizalde & Co. Inc. employees decided to organize it. Among them, Cacho would find a former teammate and friend at Bohemian, Eduardo Yrezabal, who was the stamp club president and shared his passion of collecting. He was a member of the American Air Mail Society and co-organized the Philippine Philatelic Writers' Club. In 1952, he took part at the First Pan Asian Philatelic Exhibition (PANAPEX) held in Manila where he won 13 first prizes, one special prize, two honorable mentions, and the Grand Award.

His collection included many rare Philippine stamps, including the First Flights of the Country with the Extreme Orient as his sideline. Philately was his main passion, but he was still an athlete inside and throughout his life as he took part at the sporting activities of the Casino Español de Manila in the meantime.

== Honors ==
Bohemian S.C.

- United States Philippines Championship (6): 1912, 1913, 1915, 1916, 1917, 1918
- Campeonato del Carnaval: 1913

Philippine national football team

- Far Eastern Championship Games:
  - (Gold medal) 1913
  - (Silver medal) 1915, 1919
