= Eduardo Pacheco =

Eduardo Pacheco may refer to:

- Eduardo Pacheco (Brazilian footballer) (born 1987)
- Eduardo Pacheco (Filipino sportsman) (1936–2009)
