= Alberto Villareal (footballer, born 1896) =

Filipino footballer and coach (1896–1930)

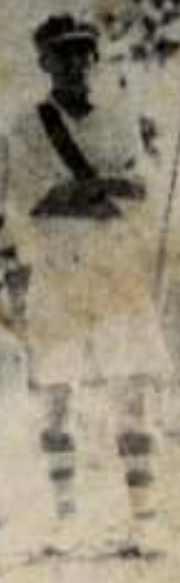

Personal information
- Birth name: Alberto Villarreal y Santa Coloma
- Date of birth: 1896
- Place of birth: Manila, Captaincy General of the Philippines
- Date of death: 1930 (aged 33–34)
- Place of death: Philippines
- Positions: Forward; midfielder; right half

Senior career*
| Years | Team | Apps | (Gls) |
| 1919-1925 | Bohemian | | |

International career
| 1919-1925 | Philippines | | |

Managerial career
- 1926: Ateneo de Manila
- 1927: University of the Philippines
- 1927: Philippines
Medal record
Philippines
Far Eastern Championship Games
| Silver medal – second place | 1919 Manila | Team |
| Silver medal – second place | 1921 Shanghai | Team |
| Silver medal – second place | 1923 Osaka | Team |
| Silver medal – second place | 1925 Manila | Team |
| Silver medal – second place | 1927 Shanghai | Team |
- * Club domestic league appearances and goals

Alberto Villareal (Note: Philipinized version of the Spanish surname) (born Alberto Villarreal y Santa Coloma; 1896–1930) was a Filipino international footballer, coach and one of the legends of the pre-war sports era. He played for Bohemian SC and, as a player, represented the Philippine Island football team in four editions of the Far Eastern Championship Games. The year after he stopped wearing the cleated shoes to become a coach and won a title with the football team of Ateneo de Manila. After that he managed the University of the Philippines and lastly the P. I. football team in the 1927 Far Eastern Championship Games in Shanghai.

== Club career ==
=== Bohemian Sporting Club ===
Alberto Villareal played for Bohemian Sporting Club around the middle of the 1910s to 1925 and was the first of his brothers to join the red sashed team. He was part of a team that was coming off of major successes and he played an important role in the first years of the 1920s, establishing himself as a Filipino champion and a three-peat winner conquering the National Philippine Championships in 1920, 1921 and 1923. During the decade of the early 20s he was joined by his brothers Fernando Villareal, Jose Villareal and Angeling Villareal, who were very talented as well and strongly reinforced every department of the pitch from the defense to the midfield, all the way to the attack and formed a formidable core in that Bohemian squad. Alberto, however, stopped playing only in 1925 to pursue a new role in world football and became a coach the year later.

== International career ==
=== 1919 Far Eastern Championship Games ===
His performances at Bohemian earned him consistently a spot in the Philippine Island football team at the Far Eastern Championship Games and participated in four consecutive editions of the tournament. He represented the country for the first time in the 1919 edition in Manila and was part of the XI in all the three games against China at the Nozaleda Park. Ten of the eleven were Bohemians except for rival team Aurora's Juan Manalac who replaced the unavailable Manuel Nieto. For the first game the team was not able to score in an even match that saw the Filipinos dominate the first half while the Chinese the second one and, in comparison to Alberto's side, were able to capitalize and win the game 0–2. In the second match Alberto and his team were more precise in front of the goal and were able to terminate the first half leading by two goals to none but the match, like the first one, was evenly matched and after conceiding the Filipinos resisted the final Chinese attacks in the final minutes of the game also thanks to Joaquín Loyzaga's save on the line that took it to a third game. Lastly the match to decide the gold medalist team went in favour of China who were capable to turn it around after Joaquín "Chacho" López scored first.

=== 1921 and 1923 Far Eastern Championship Games ===
In the two following editions Alberto was joined by his brother Fernando. Firstly at the 1921 Far East Games in Shanghai and after a big 3–1 win against the Japanese side the Filipinos fell short against China and returned home with a silver medal. At the 1923 Osaka edition the P. I. team were coached by Manuel Amechazurra which had to select some college junior players due to the unavailability of six players. The team did not match the strength of the Chinese side and became more and more violent involving also part of the crowd. The next game against Japan Alberto's team conceded first but were able to turn the match around and won by three goals to one obtaining a silver medal at the final whistle.

=== 1925 Far Eastern Championship Games ===
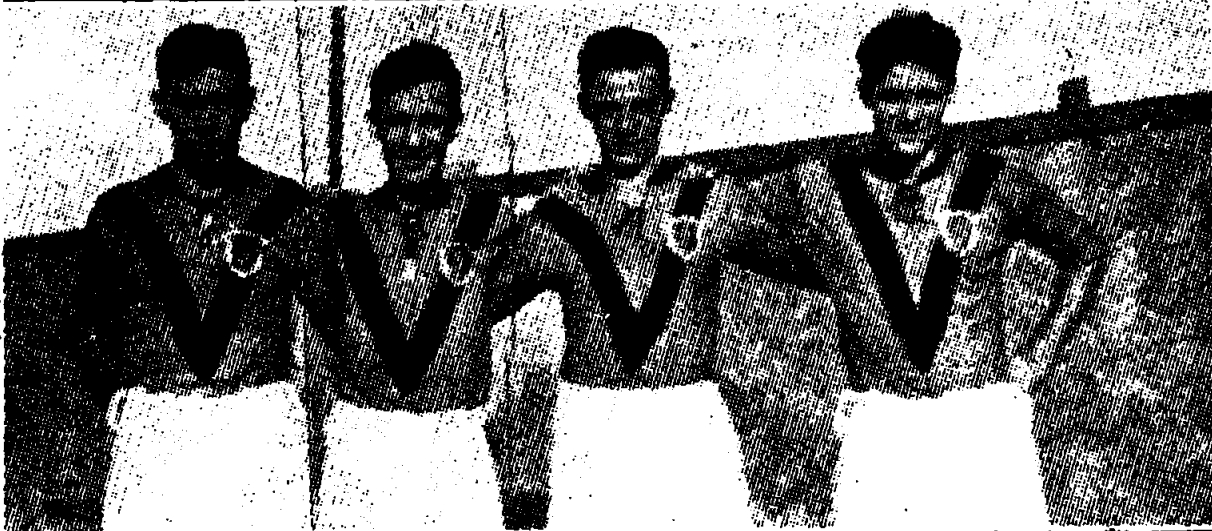
Alberto, Fernando, Jose and Angel at the Far East Games 1925

The last involvement as a player for Alberto was in the 1925 Far East Games in the city he was born in and in the city he debuted for the Philippines, Manila. Before he hung up his boots he shared that moment along his brothers Fernando, Jose and Angel who were also selected to represent the National Team. He was deployed in the right side of the field playing as a right half back and overall his tournament ended like his previous ones. After winning convincingly against Japan he and his team weren't able to best China and Alberto sent his farewells as a player after receiving his fourth silver medal.

== Managerial career ==
After hanging his boots only in 1925, right after the Far East Games, Villareal was appointed to be at the wheel of the football team of Ateneo de Manila. He was immediately impactful and managed to coach and lead the collegiate side straight away to a National Title in 1926, a championship that during those years also featured clubs from abroad. Ateneo was also the first ever college team to be crowned as Filipino Football Champions. The following year in 1927, instead, he left the reigning champions to lead the U. P. Football Team in which he was not able to repeat himself as a champion but was in the position to still get good results and made once again a young side a creditable team. Thanks to those accomplishments at club level he was chosen to manage the P. I. football team in the Far Eastern Championship Games in Shanghai which were held in that same year and they saw Alberto select and bring to China Francisco Medel, Rafael Lallana, Ramon Altonaga, Jose Martinez, Agustin Guanco, Jose V. Rodriguez, Federico Serra, Ildefonso Tronqued, Jesus Goiri, Celestino Martinez, Roque Monfort, G. Azcona, Jose Acosta, N. Rosado, Jose Sotelo and I. Gonzalez. Despite being a coach who achieved a lot in just a few years, he was not able to instruct the players correctly and replicate the football he proposed back in the Philippines. The tournament saw Japan score its first ever win against the Filipinos and the latters, the next game against China, after giving away a penalty, protested and walked away from the pitch and after returning to the field became more aggressive and like in previous editions the crowds were involved. After forfeiting the match the two sides, to placate the spectators, kicked around the ball, by then, in a meaningless match.

== Personal life ==
Alberto was born in Manila and was the first of seven children of Carlos Ramon Fernando Villarreal y Moras and Doña Carmen Santa Coloma y Navarro. He was the eldest between his sisters Ines Villarreal Y Santa Coloma, born in 1899, Salud Villarreal y Santa Coloma born in 1901 and his brothers Fernando, Jose, Angel and Carlos. Like him his brothers played football and the first three were together the stars at Bohemian while his other brother Carlos, also a renowned amateur boxer, was selected in the National team in the 1923 Far East Games but last played for Club Filipino before his injury stopped him from any sporting activity. Outside of football, while being a player and later a coach, Alberto Villareal worked at the Bank of the Philippines Island before dying just in 1930. Even so, his legacy still continued through his brothers, as Jose's sons Alberto “Albert” Villareal y Garcia, named after him, then Jose “Joey” Villareal y Garcia, Rafael “Raffy” Villareal y Garcia, Juan “Juancho” Villareal y Garcia and also, Fernando's son, Fernando “Tito” Villareal Jr. were all football players.

== Honors ==
=== Player ===
Bohemian S.C.

- United States Philippines Championship (3): 1920, 1921, 1922

Philippine national football team

- Far Eastern Championship Games: (Silver medal) 1919, 1921, 1923, 1925

=== Manager ===
Ateneo de Manila

- United States Philippines Championship: 1926

Philippine national football team

- Far Eastern Championship Games: (Silver medal) 1927
