= Jose Villareal (footballer, born 1900) =

Filipino footballer

Jose "Peping" Villareal
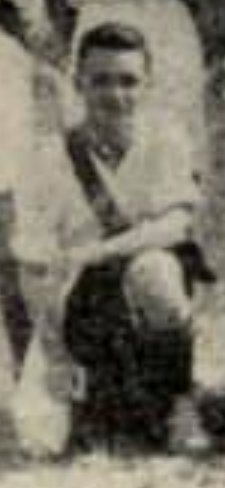

Personal information
- Birth name: José Villarreal y Santa Coloma
- Date of birth: October 19, 1900
- Place of birth: Manila, Captaincy General of the Philippines
- Date of death: November 14, 1973 (aged 73)
- Place of death: Philippines
- Position: Forward

Senior career*
| Years | Team | Apps | (Gls) |
| 1925-1927 | Bohemian | | |

International career
| 1925 | Philippines | | |
Medal record
Philippines
Far Eastern Championship Games
| Silver medal – second place | 1925 Manila | Team |
- * Club domestic league appearances and goals

Jose Villareal (born José Villarreal y Santa Coloma; October 19, 1900 – November 14, 1973), known as Jose "Peping" Villareal or simply Peping, was a Filipino international footballer. He was a forward (specifically a right out) for Bohemian SC and the Philippine Island football team, representing the latter in the 1925 Far Eastern Championship Games in Manila.

== Early life ==
Villareal was the fourth of seven children of Carlos Ramon Fernando Villarreal y Moras and Doña Carmen Santa Coloma y Navarro. His sisters were Ines Villarreal Y Santa Coloma, born in 1899, and Salud Villarreal y Santa Coloma born in 1901. Three of his brothers, Alberto, Fernando and Angel, played football with him on the Bohemian Sporting Club. A fourth brother, Carlos, played for Club Filipino and was also a renowned amateur boxer. Fernando's son, Fernando “Tito” Villareal Jr., was also a football player.

== Sporting career ==
Villareal played alongside his brothers Angeling "Angel", Alberto and Fernando for the Bohemian Sporting Club. He was reputed to be one of the best forwards and right outs of the Philippines as well as the fastest player in the country at one time. His brothers Alberto and Fernando were considered two of the best halfbacks and were supported by their brother Angel at fullback.

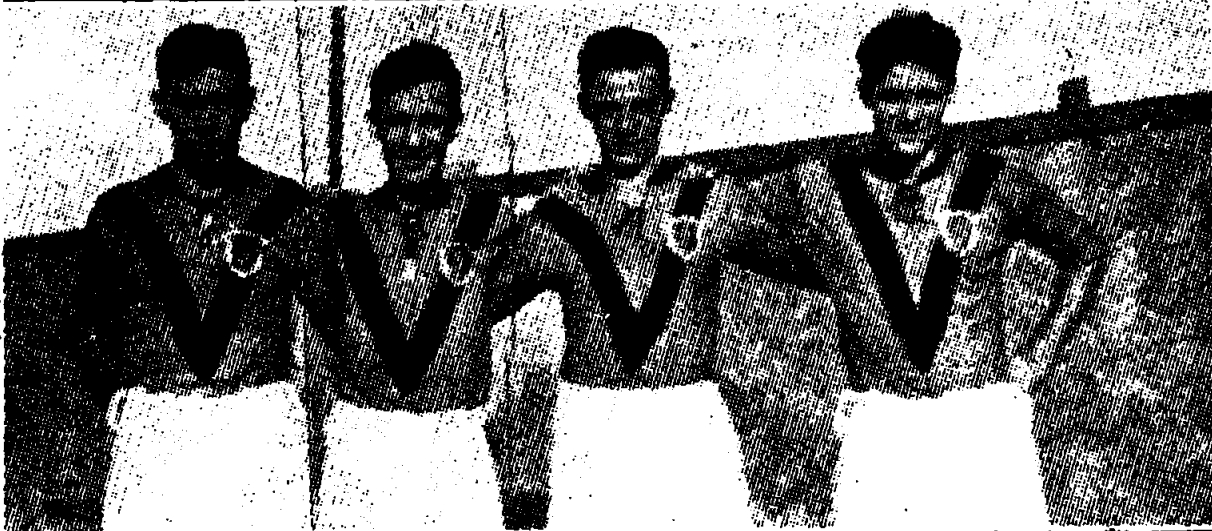
Alberto, Fernando, Jose and Angel at the Far East Games 1925

The brothers were selected for the Philippine Island football team in the 1925 Far Eastern Championship Games in Manila, earning a silver medal after losing the deciding game to China.

The 1927 tournament marked Alberto's retirement from football. Villareal and his two remaining brothers on the team led the Bohemian Sporting Club to a national title in 1927.

== Personal life ==
He married Milagros Garcia y Ruiz with whom he had four sons, all of whom were post-war footballers who played for the Philippines national football team: Alberto “Albert” Villareal y Garcia, Jose "Joey" Villareal y Garcia, Rafael "Raffy" Villareal y Garcia and Juan "Juancho" Villareal y Garcia. Alberto, a graduate of De La Salle University, won several trophies with the YCO Athletic Club; he played for the national team at the 1954 Manila edition and was the captain of the Filipino's Asian Games team that defeated Japan in the 1958 Tokyo edition. Joey was also part of the 1958 team and was the National Team captain at the 1962 Asian Games in Indonesia; he was among the PFF outstanding player awardees of the decade. Raffy played for La Salle, Meralco and the national team in the 1960s. Juancho was a Meralco and national youth standout. After his football career, Jose worked as a traveling salesman.

== Honors ==
Bohemian S.C.

- United States Philippines Championship: 1927

Philippine national football team

- Far Eastern Championship Games: (Silver medal) 1925
