= José María Zaragoza =

Filipino architect (1912–1994)

- Born: José María Zaragoza y Vélez; December 6, 1912; Quiapo, Manila, Philippine Islands
- Died: November 26, 1994 (aged 81); Manila, Philippines
- Education: University of Santo Tomas
- Occupation: Architect
- Awards: Order of National Artists of the Philippines
- Buildings: Santo Domingo Church; Meralco Building; Casino Español de Manila (1951 building)
- Projects: Quiapo Church (1968 expansion)

José María Vélez Zaragoza (December 6, 1912 – November 26, 1994) was a Filipino architect.

== Education ==
Zaragoza took up BS Architecture at the University of Santo Tomas where he graduated in 1936. He placed 7th in the licensure exams in the 1938.

He also had a diploma in liturgical art and architecture from the Rome-based International Institute of Liturgical Art. At the Hilversum Technical Research Center in the Netherlands, he obtained a diploma in comprehensive planning.

== Career ==
During the earlier years of his career, Zaragoza had meetings with American architect Frank Lloyd Wright culminating with a visit to Wright' atelier in Arizona in the United States in 1956. However, unlike his contemporaries, Zaragoza looked into European architecture for inspiration instead of drawing from American architecture.

=== Religious buildings ===
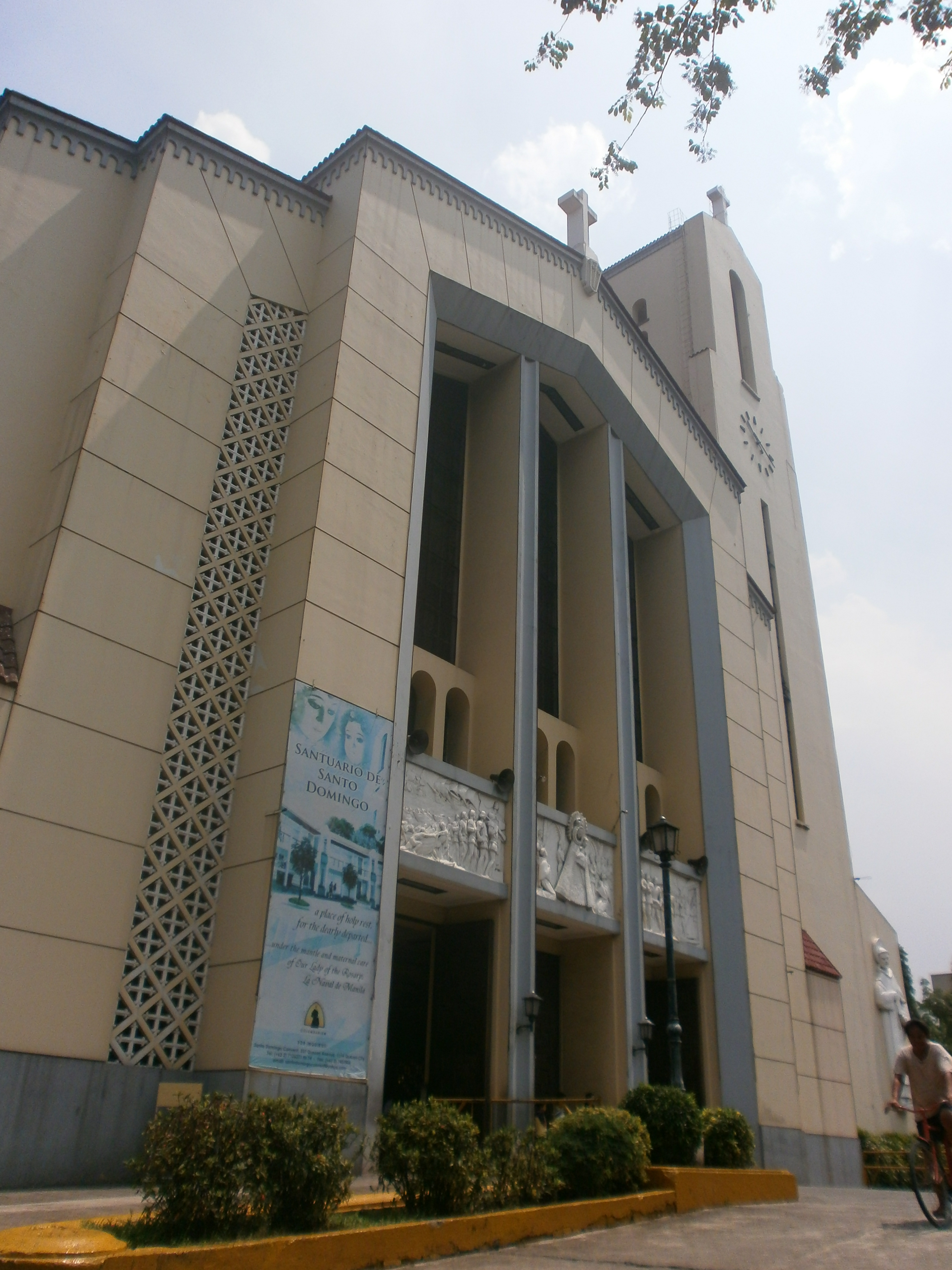
Santo Domingo Church

Zaragoza was involved in designing several religious buildings such as The Our Lady of the Holy Rosary in Tala, Caloocan completed in 1950; the Santo Domingo Church in Quezon City and the Villa San Miguel in Mandaluyong both which was finished in 1954; the Pius XII Center in Manila completed in 1958, and the expansion of the Quiapo Church completed in 1984, a project met with some controversy.

He was invited by Brazilian architects Oscar Niemeyer and Lúcio Costa to be one of the guest architects in designing Brasília, which was planned to be the new capital city of Brazil.

Zaragoza also designed the former Union Church of Manila, a shell-shaped church that resembled the Philippine Exposition Hall in New York of 1936. This church building, dedicated in 1975, was torn down in the late 1990s to make room for a new Union Church of Manila on a portion of the same site.

Zaragoza also designed the Saint John Bosco and the National Shrine of Our Lady of the Miraculous Medal.

Overall, he designed about 45 churches and religious centers.

=== Other buildings ===
Zaragoza also designed the Meralco Building, the original Virra Mall (now V-Mall) and the Zaragoza building, and he contributed to the design of the National Library of the Philippines and to the design of the Bataan Power Plant of the National Power Corporation.

Altogether he designed 36 office buildings, 4 hotels, 2, hospitals, 5 low-cost and middle-income housing projects, as well as more than 270 residences.

=== Style ===
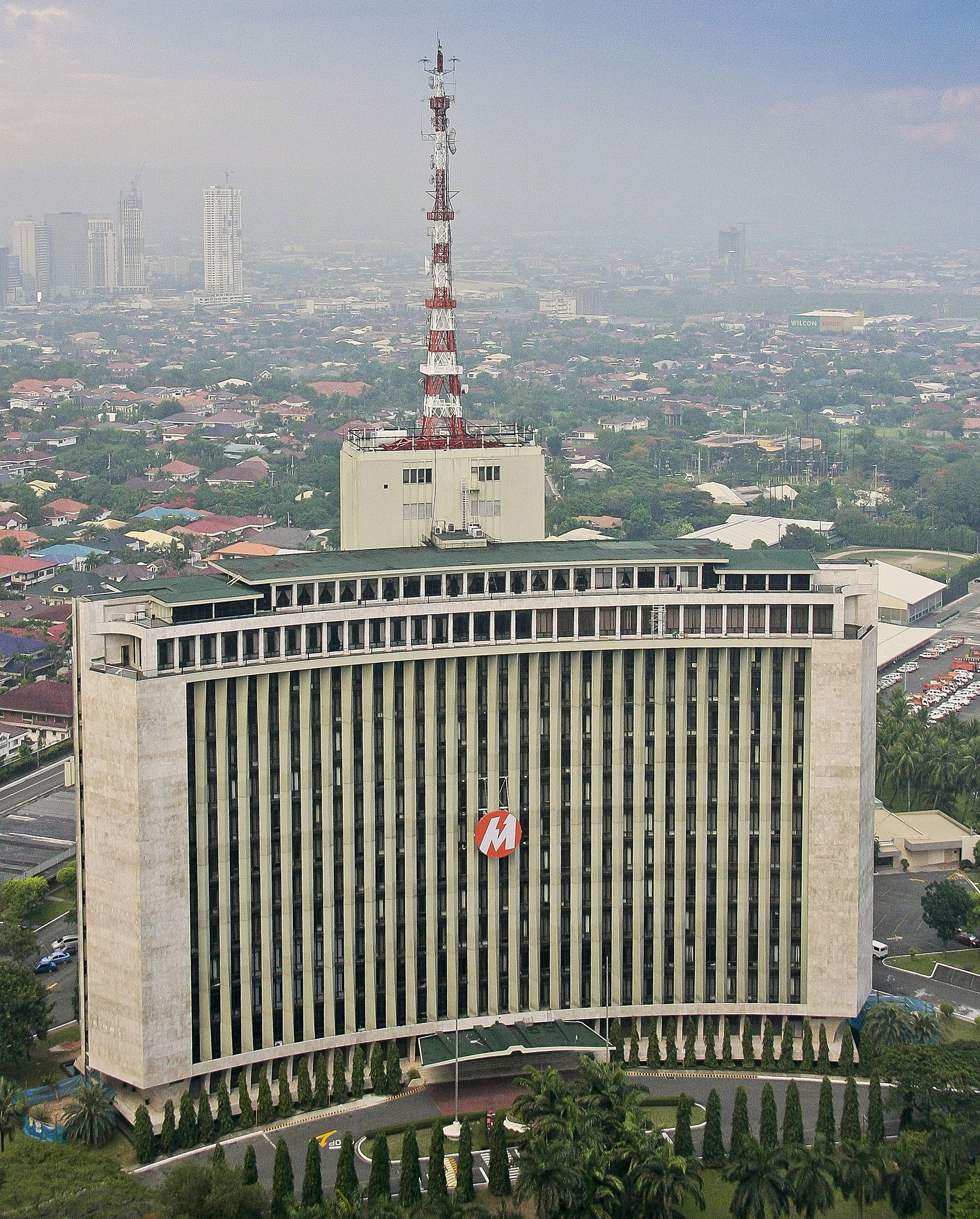
The Meralco building in Ortigas

Zaragoza derived traditional forms from Spanish colonial architecture and combined it with simple, unornamented designs of the International style. This design was evident in the arcades of the Santo Domingo Church in Quezon City.

His style had an impact of designs of houses. The visual framework of the "Spanish style" architecture which was favored in residences from the 1950s to the 1960s was derived from his designs. The "Spanish style" is not widely used in Spain but the name was an adopted term in Philippine residential architecture. Among Zaragoza's works this style is most evident in his design of the 1951 building of the Casino Español de Manila.

After his involvements in Brazil, his later works had influences from Brazilian architecture as evident in the Meralco Center in Ortigas and Philbank Building in the Port Area, Manila both finished in 1965. The Commercial and Bank Trust Company Building, completed in 1969, in Escolta, Manila, incorporates subtle flowing Latino line design.

== Religious involvements ==
Zaragoza became an ambassador of the Sovereign Military Order of Malta to the Philippines. He was also conferred the Gentiluomo di Sua Santita (Lay Member of the Papal Household) by Pope John Paul II for his contributions to the Catholic Church, allowing him to serve as a lay attendant of the Pope in the Vatican City.

== Death ==
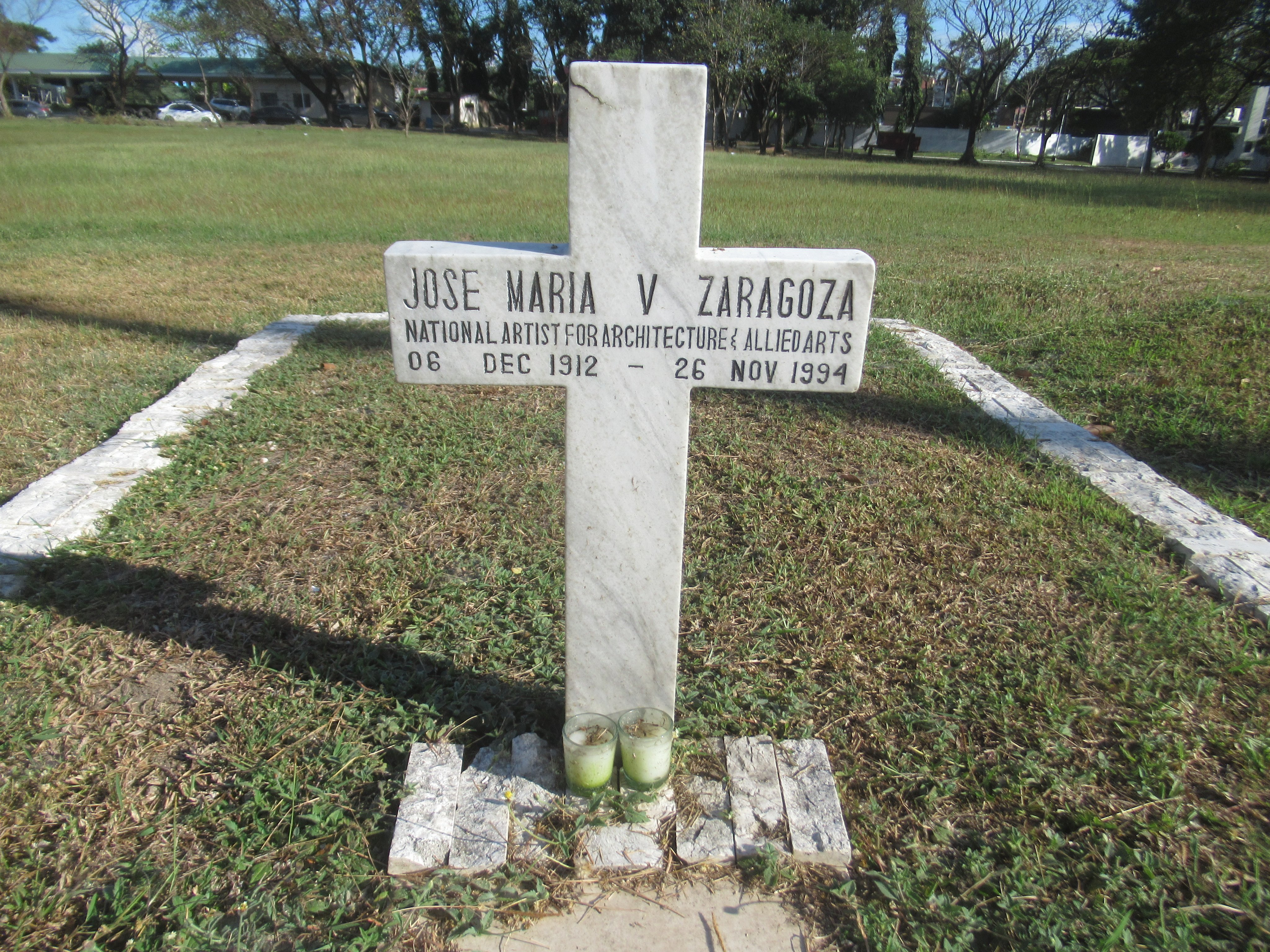
Zaragoza' grave in the Libingan ng mga Bayani

He died on November 26, 1994, at the age of 81 in Manila, Philippines. His remains were later re-interred in the Libingan ng mga Bayani and was accorded a state funeral.

== Awards ==
- 1973: Patnubay ng Sining at Kalinangan (Stalwart of Art and Culture) Award, awarded by the City of Manila.
- 1977: Gold Medal of Merit awarded by the Philippine Institute of Architects (PIA), bestowed to him by his mentor Juan Nakpil.
- 2014: National Artist for Architecture, conferred by the President of the Philippines through Proclamation No. 812.
