= Virgilio Lobregat =

Association football player (1901–1944)

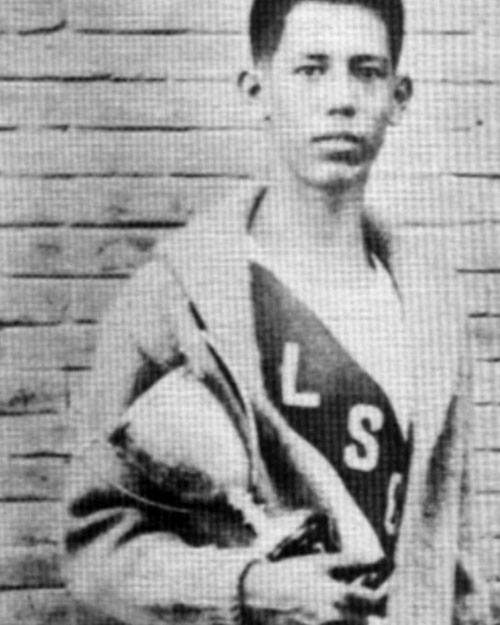
- Lobregat in his La Salle uniform
- Born: Virgilio Antonio Jesús Llobregat y Zalvidea; 23 May 1901; Mula, Murcia, Spain
- Died: 30 August 1944 (aged 43); Manila, Philippines
- Cause of death: Execution by beheading
- Height: 1.88 m (6 ft 2 in)
Association football career
- Position: Center forward
Youth career
- La Salle Nozaleda
Senior career*
Years	Team	Apps	(Gls)
1918–1927	Bohemian		
- Manila Nomads
- Casino Español
International career
1919–1925	Philippines		
Medal record
Philippines
Far Eastern Championship Games
Silver medal – second place	1919 Manila	Team
Silver medal – second place	1925 Manila	Team
- * Club domestic league appearances and goals
- Military career
- Allegiance: Philippine Commonwealth
- Service years: Until 1944
- Conflicts: World War II; Japanese occupation of the Philippines

Virgilio Lobregat (Note: Philipinized version of the Spanish surname Llobregat) (23 May 1901 – 30 August 1944) was a Filipino sportsman best known as a football player. He played for Bohemian S.C., Manila Nomads Sports Club and Casino Español de Manila. At international level he competed for the Philippines national football team at the Far Eastern Games. During World War II, he opposed and fought the Imperial Japanese Army as he joined a guerrilla led by Juan Miguel Elizalde. He was executed in August 1944 along with Elizalde and 70 other prisoners at the Manila North Cemetery.

== Early life and education ==
Virgilio Lobregat was born on 23 May 1901 in Mula, a Spanish municipality in the Region of Murcia, being the fourth and youngest child of a Spanish father Celso Llobregat y Rague and a Filipina mother Antonia Zalvidea y Asunción Cruz. He only stayed there shortly as his family took him and moved to the Philippine Islands in 1904.

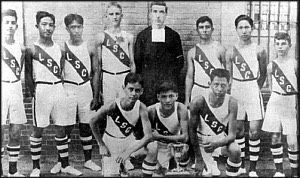
La Salle basketball team in 1914, Lobregat sitting first from right

Lobregat, after being settled in the country, attended the La Salle Nozaleda institute in second grade, in 1911. During his school years he demonstrated early signs that he was already a phenomenal athlete succeeding in multiple sports and became the nucleus of the champion teams that La Salle turned out to be in that decade. He then graduated from La Salle high school in 1918.

== Sporting career ==
=== Football ===
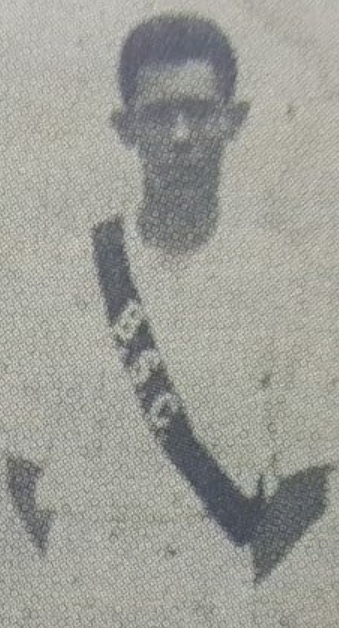
Virgilio Lobregat in his time at Bohemian SC

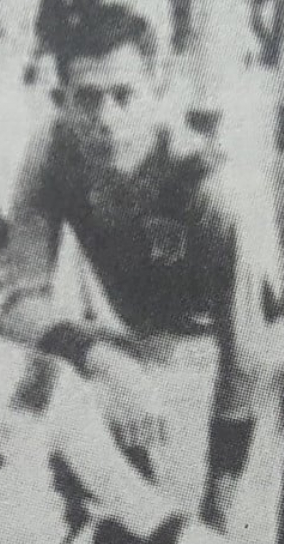
Virgilio Lobregat in the 1925 Far eastern games

"Virgilio Lobregat. I consider him the best Filipino player during my time"

— Joaquín "Chacho" López

Virgilio Lobregat is regarded as the best Filipino player in the pre-World War II period after Paulino Alcántara by the PFF and one of the best Filipino football players of all time. He was given the recognition by the PFF with the title of "Football Player of the Half Century". He was known for his striking ability and his great understanding of the game. Lobregat, still in his teenage years, became part of the Bohemian Sporting Club where he spent most of his football career at and was one of the most important component of the team that dominated the late 1910s and 1920s. In his first years at the club he was able to distinguish himself from the others as an outstanding athlete, at 6 ft 2 in (1.88 m), playing as a forward and successfully filled in the role left by Alcántara after he left Bohemian. Lobregat helped the club win the National Open Championship five times in 1918 completing Bohemian's incredible four-peat (1915, 1916, 1917, 1918) and also led the team to another three-peat run in 1920, 1921 and 1922 before winning his last Championship title, the club's 10th, in 1927. After spending almost a decade as a Bohemian from 1918 to 1927, he then left to play for the Manila Nomads and later on for the Casino Español de Manila. Lobregat was also part of the Philippines national team at the 1919 and 1925 Far Eastern Games capturing, both times, a silver medal.

=== Others ===
Lobregat was an all-around athlete, aside from football, he also played basketball standing as a 6 ft 2 in (1.88 m) center and played baseball as a home run batter. He was also a track and field athlete and competed as a long-distance runner and high jumper. He also won the pentathlon and decathlon events during the initial years of the Philippine Amateur Track and Field Federation.

== Other involvements ==
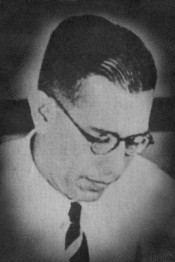
Virgilio Lobregat during his duty as the DLSAA President

Lobregat became a member of the De La Salle Alumni Association in 1920 and served as its president from 1930 to 1932. He was awarded by the association in 1961 with the DLSAA Distinguished Lasallian Awardee and in 1993 he was inducted in the DLSAA Sports Hall of Fame.

At some point in his life he would become the Vice President of the Elizalde Group of Companies, a post he would serve until his capture.

== Personal life ==
From a Spanish Filipino family he was the youngest child of a Spanish father, Don Celso Llobregat y Rague and a Filipina mother Doña Antonia Zalvidea y Asunción Cruz. His siblings were Margarita Olilia, Celso Esteban Ramón Tirso "Tito" Jr and Ramón Aniceto Celso. On the 21st July of 1926 Virgilio married Ana María Cabarrús y Sánchez-Antón with whom had a total of three children, being Consuelo "Cona", Carmen and Virgilio Lobregat Jr.

Part of one of the most influential families in the Philippines, he had relatives that throughout time were associated with arts, politics and businesses. Relations that embed both of his lineages and that of the far larger family of his mother side, the Asuncións. Starting from his maternal grand-uncle, Filipino painter, Justiniano Asunción to his politician nephew Celso Lobregat and to those from a second or third generation relative.

== World War II, death and legacy ==
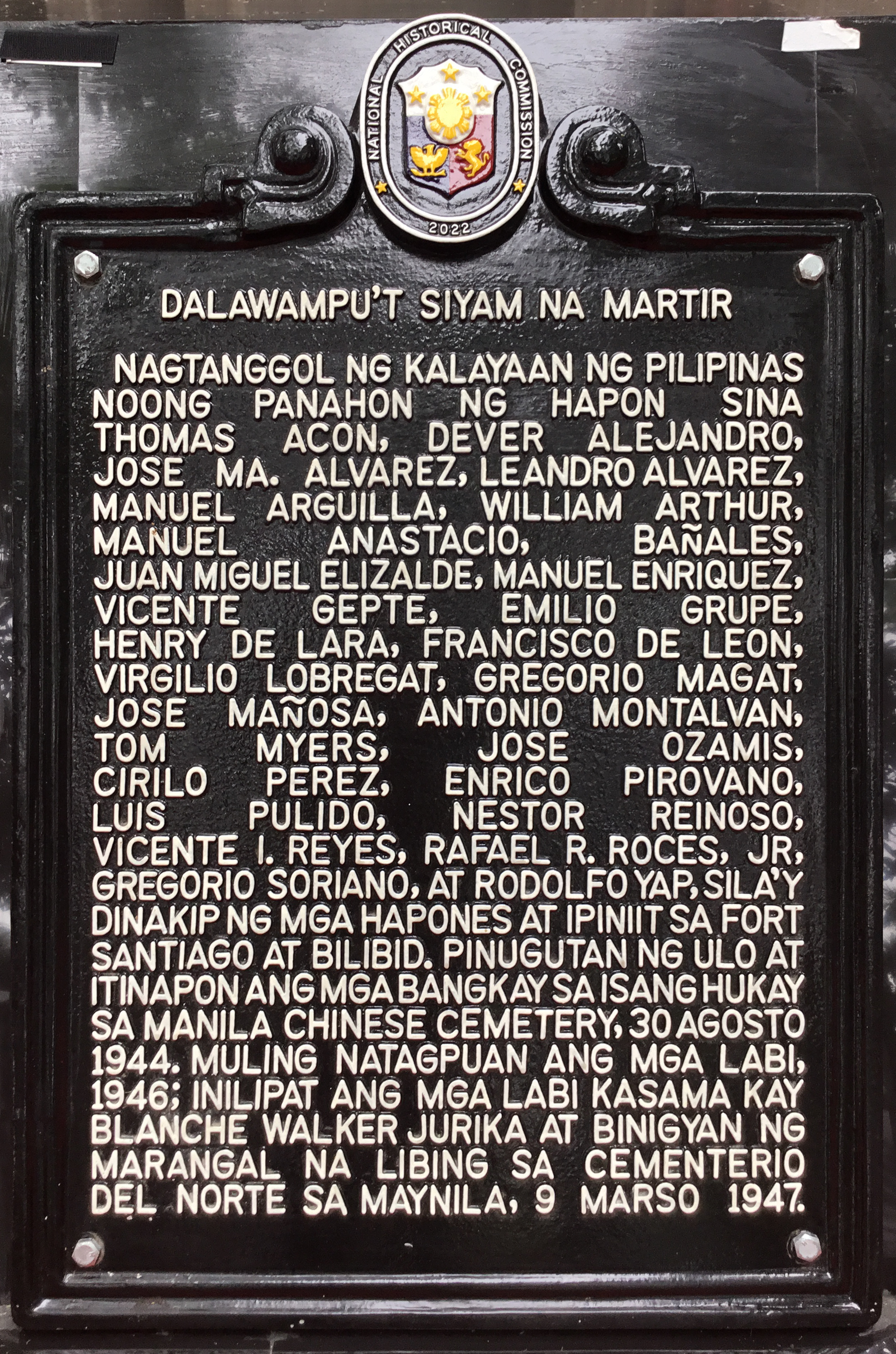
His name, among the 29 martyrs, honored with a historical marker.

Throughout his life, Lobregat was mostly known for his incredible athleticism while playing various sports but he also displayed true heroism and patriotism during the war. During the Japanese occupation of the Philippines in World War II he joined Juan Miguel Elizalde and his guerrilla and fought against the Japanese while also serving as a spy. He was caught and detained at Fort Santiago by the Japanese as a prisoner of war who, after, beheaded him in August 1944 along with Elizalde and 70 other prisoners at the Manila North Cemetery. According to his grave also at the same cemetery, Lobregat died on 30 August 1944.

Lobregat, basketball player Jacinto Cruz and swimmer Teófilo Yldefonso were named the "Outstanding Athletes of Half-A-Century" by the Philippine Amateur Athletic Federation. He was also named as the "Football Player of the Half Century" in the 1970s by the Philippine Football Association. A football field in Makati, where the statue of Benigno Aquino Jr. is situated, was named after him and the Lobregat Cup, a football tournament held from the late 1940s to 1970s, was as well named in his honor.

== Honors ==
Bohemian S.C.

- United States Philippines Championship (5): 1918, 1920, 1921, 1922, 1927

Philippine national football team

- Far Eastern Championship Games: (Silver medal) 1919, 1925
