= Eduardo Pacheco (Filipino sportsman) =

Filipino sportsman

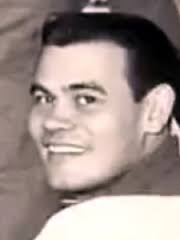

Personal information
- Born: Eduardo Alvir Pacheco; January 4, 1936
- Died: December 9, 2009 (aged 73) Quezon City, Philippines
- Height: 5 ft 9 in (175 cm)
- Weight: 174 lb (79 kg)
Association football career
International career
Years	Team	Apps	(Gls)
1954–1967	Philippines		(~2)

Sport
- Basketball career

Career information
- High school: San Beda (Manila)
- College: UST
- Playing career: 1956–1973
- Position: Guard
- Number: 9
- Coaching career: 1975–1987

Career history

Playing
- 1956–1957: 7-Up Uncolas
- 1958–1965: Ysmael Steel Admirals
- 1965–1968: YCO Painters
- 1968–1969: U/tex Weavers
- 1969–1971: 7-Up Uncolas

Coaching
- 1975–1980: UST HS
- 1980–1982: UST
- 1986–1987: San Beda
Medals
Men's basketball
Representing the Philippines
ABC Championship
Gold medal – first place	1963 Taipei	Team
Asian Games
Gold medal – first place	1962 Jakarta	Team

Eduardo Alvir Pacheco also known by his nickname, Eddie Pacheco, was a Filipino sportsman who has represented the Philippines both in international basketball and football.

== Education ==
Pacheco attended elementary (1946-1950) and high school (1950-1954) San Beda College.

He took up B.S. Architecture at the University of Santo Tomas (1954-1958).

== Football ==
Pacheco made into the Philippine national football team when he was a junior student at San Beda College. He was a member of the national team that participated at the 1954 Asian Games. He made a goal against Vietnam in a match that ended in a 2–3 defeat. He was named Mr. Football in 1954 by the Philippine Sportswriter Association. Pacheco decided to switch to basketball due for financial reasons.

Scores and results list the Philippines' goal tally first.

#	Date	Venue	Opponent	Score	Result	Competition
-	May 3, 1954	Rizal Memorial Stadium, Manila	South Vietnam	? (1 goal)	2–3	1954 Asian Games
-	September 28, 1967	Tokyo	Lebanon	1–0	1–11	1968 Summer Olympics qualification

== Basketball ==
Pacheco played for the Philippine national basketball team. He was part of the squad that participated at the 1960 (Rome). (In some references, he was listed as "Edgardo Pacheco" which was a typographical error that many references went with)

Pacheco was also part of the team that won gold at the 1962 Asian Games. Pacheco was named most outstanding basketball player by the Philippine Sportswriter Association in 1962. He played in MICAA for the 7Up Bottlers, the Ysmael Steel Admirals, YCO Painters and the U/tex Weavers. Pacheco retired from competitive basketball in 1973.

== Other sports ==
Pacheco was also a bowler (member of TBAM; Tenpin Bowlers Association of Makati) swimmer, volleyball player and track and field athlete.

== Later life ==
After his retirement he became an area manager for Julius Rothschild Ltd. He made frequent trips abroad and continues to play basketball for recreation purposes. He also served as senior administrative officer at the Philippine Sports Commission under executive director Dr. Lucrecio Calo.

== Death ==
Pacheco died in his sleep on December 9, 2009, due to cardiac arrest in a Quezon City apartment that he was renting. He was 73 years old at the time of his death.

== Personal life ==
Eddie was the son of Filipino football legend Emilio Pacheco.

He had four children from a previous relationship; Eduardo Jr., Catherine, Elizabeth, and Joseph.

He married Maria Lourdes Marqueta on October 17, 1972.

He worked for the Philippine Sports Commission up until the time of his demise as a Consultant.
