= Casino Español de Manila =

Socio-civic club for Hispano-Filipinos

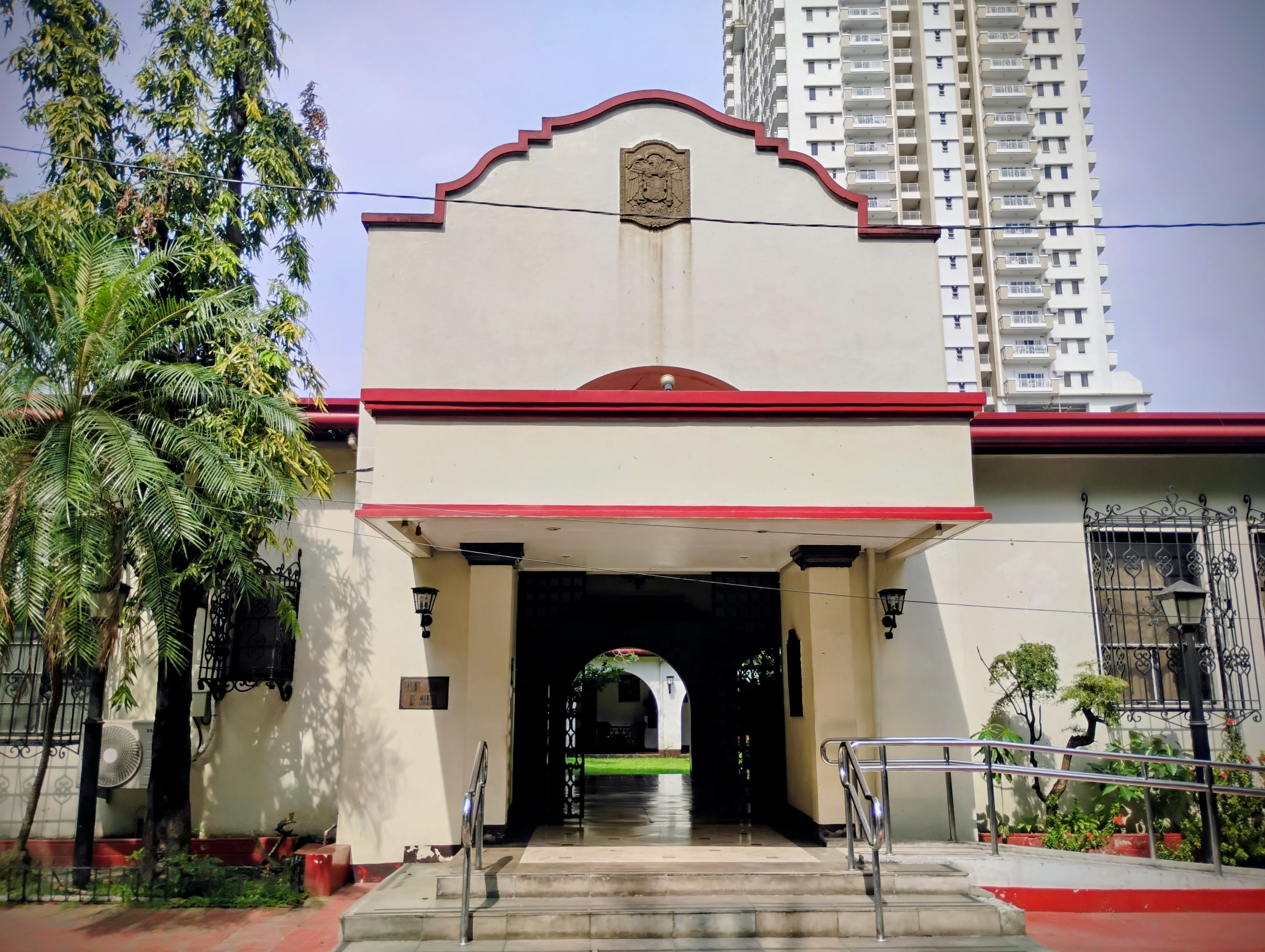
- The façade of the Casino Español de Manila official clubhouse

General information
- Architectural style: Neo-renaissance
- Location: 14.5844°N 120.9848°E, No. 855 Teodoro M. Kalaw Extension, Manila, Philippines
- Groundbreaking: 1913
- Inaugurated: 1917
- Renovated: 1951

Design and construction
- Architect: Juan Arellano

Renovating team
- Architect: José María Zaragoza

Casino Español de Manila is a club established in 1888 by Spaniards living in the Philippines as their exclusive venue for recreational and social activities. It later opened its doors to Filipino members to foster Spanish-Filipino ties in the country. It is located at No. 855 Teodoro M. Kalaw Extension, Ermita, Manila.

It is one of the three Casino Español clubhouses in the country, the others being in Cebu (built in 1920 and still operating) and Iloilo (built in 1926 and left in ruins after World War II destruction).

== History ==
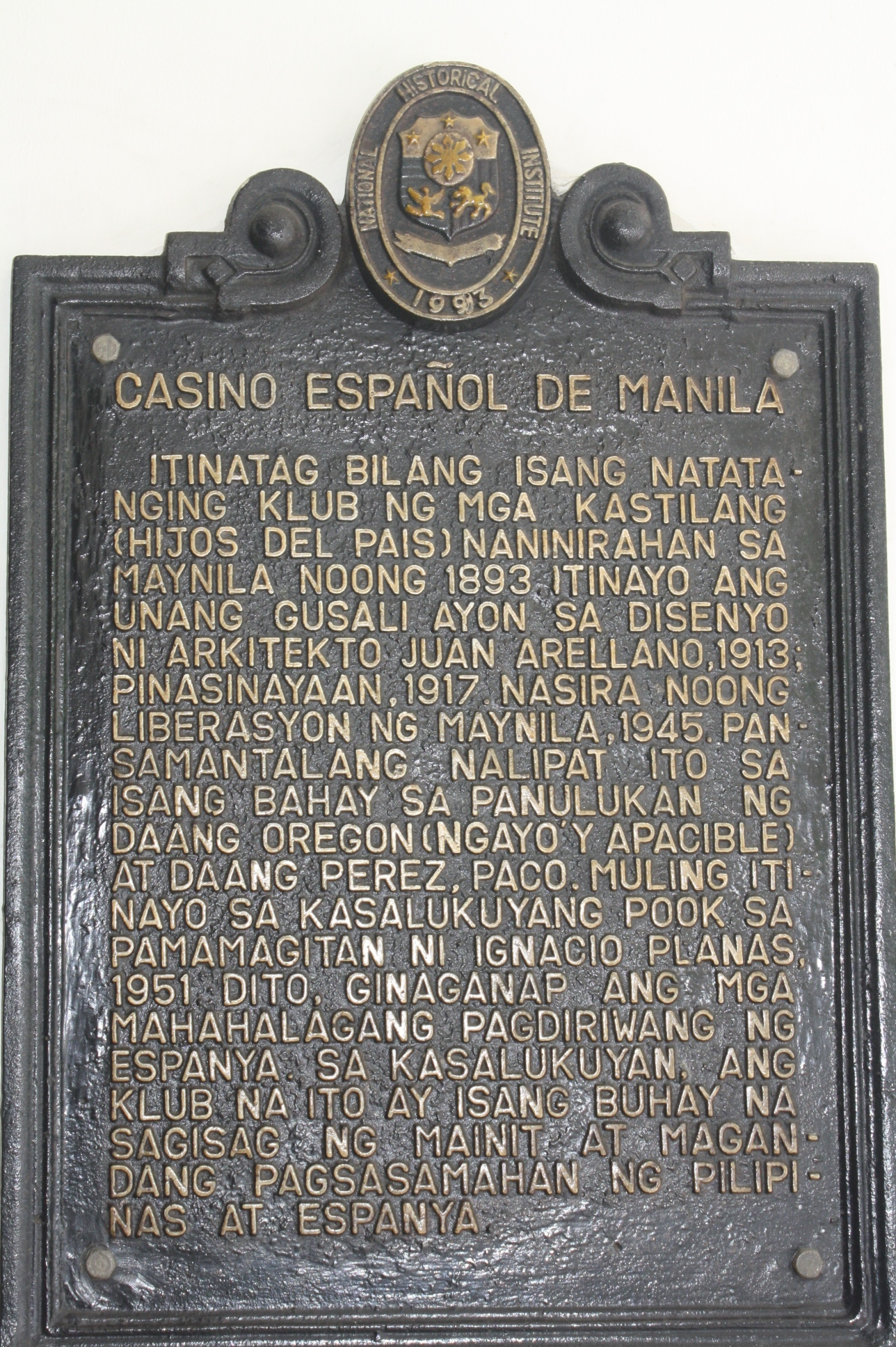
Historical marker installed by the National Historical Institute in 1993

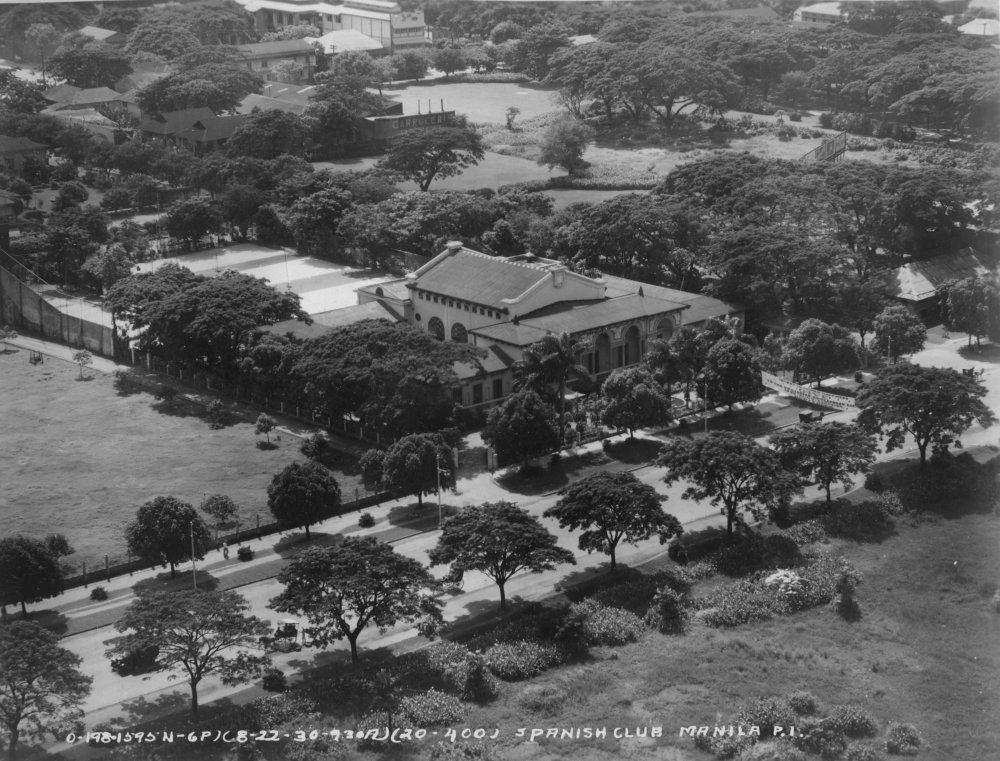
Aerial view of the Casino Español de Manila (1930)

=== Spanish period ===
Earlier records show that Governor General Narciso Clavería y Zaldúa formalized the foundation of the casino in Manila on October 31, 1844, the date which is celebrated by the casino as the year of its founding.

=== American colonial period ===
The first building of the Casino Español de Manila was built in 1913 but formally opened in 1917. It was designed by the architect Juan Arellano, incorporating influences of neo-renaissance style.

The structure used to occupy the whole block from Taft Avenue to San Marcelino Street and housed the offices of the Spanish Chamber of Commerce and the Consulate General of Spain. As the official clubhouse and social venue of the Spanish community, the building's reception and banquet halls hosted parties, celebrations and balls. Among the noted events in this venue in the 1930s was the extravagant party held to celebrate the birthday of the King of Spain. Apart from attending parties in its halls, guests could also view the garden from the terrace while members could play tennis and pelota games in its courts.

In 1945, the structure was destroyed in World War II during the Liberation of Manila. The club was temporarily moved to a two-story house along Apacible Street (formerly Oregon) and Perez Street in Paco, Manila.

=== Post-War period ===
In 1951, Casino Español de Manila was rebuilt on its original site through the help of Ignacio Planas. Parts of the property were sold and the new structure was built facing San Luis Street (now Kalaw Avenue). The new clubhouse was designed by the architect José María Zaragoza using the prevalent post-World War II "Filipino-California-Spanish style". The structure has arched verandas surrounding an inner courtyard.

The new clubhouse was inaugurated on November 3, 1951, with President Elpidio Quirino and Vice-president Fernando López in attendance. In 1962, it played host to the Infante Juan Carlos of Spain (later King Juan Carlos I) and Princess Sofía of Greece and Denmark (later Queen Sofía). Queen Sofía visited the club once again in 2000 during an official visit to the Philippines.

=== The Present ===
While the Casino Español traditionally services its members, guests and visitors have been welcomed to its compound. The 50-seat Comedor Cervantes serves a traditional range of Spanish, Filipino and international cuisine. Huge antique plates decorate the high walls, individually crafted and hand-painted bearing the coat-of-arms of each of the provincial districts of Spain. The adjoining Bar el Quixote is a well-stocked chamber of select Spanish wines and other spirits. At the back, it has a fronton that is used for jai alai and pelota games. Beside the Casino is the space formerly occupied by the Instituto Cervantes de Manila where Spanish classes were held, that promoted the Spanish heritage of the Philippines.

The club holds its open-air festivities in its quadrangle, the Patio de Orquídeas, where annual events are celebrated, such as the "El Día de Los Tres Reyes Magos", commemorating the feast of the Magi; and the "Día de Santiago" that commemorates the feast of Saint James the Apostle, the patron saint of Spain. A central architectural feature of the edifice is a cloister, lined with the club's ballroom, the Salón de Rizal; and function rooms such as the Salón El Cid for large group events, the Salón de Alegre for the "caballeros", and the elaborate Salón de Señoras lounge for ladies. Towards the club's Fronton where games of Jai alai and pelota are held, is the Biblioteca Academia de la Lengua Española, a library housing a collection of artefacts and journals about Spain. In 1993, the National Historical Commission of the Philippines erected a marker at the entrance of the Casino, declaring its premises as a Level-II heritage structure.

== Images ==
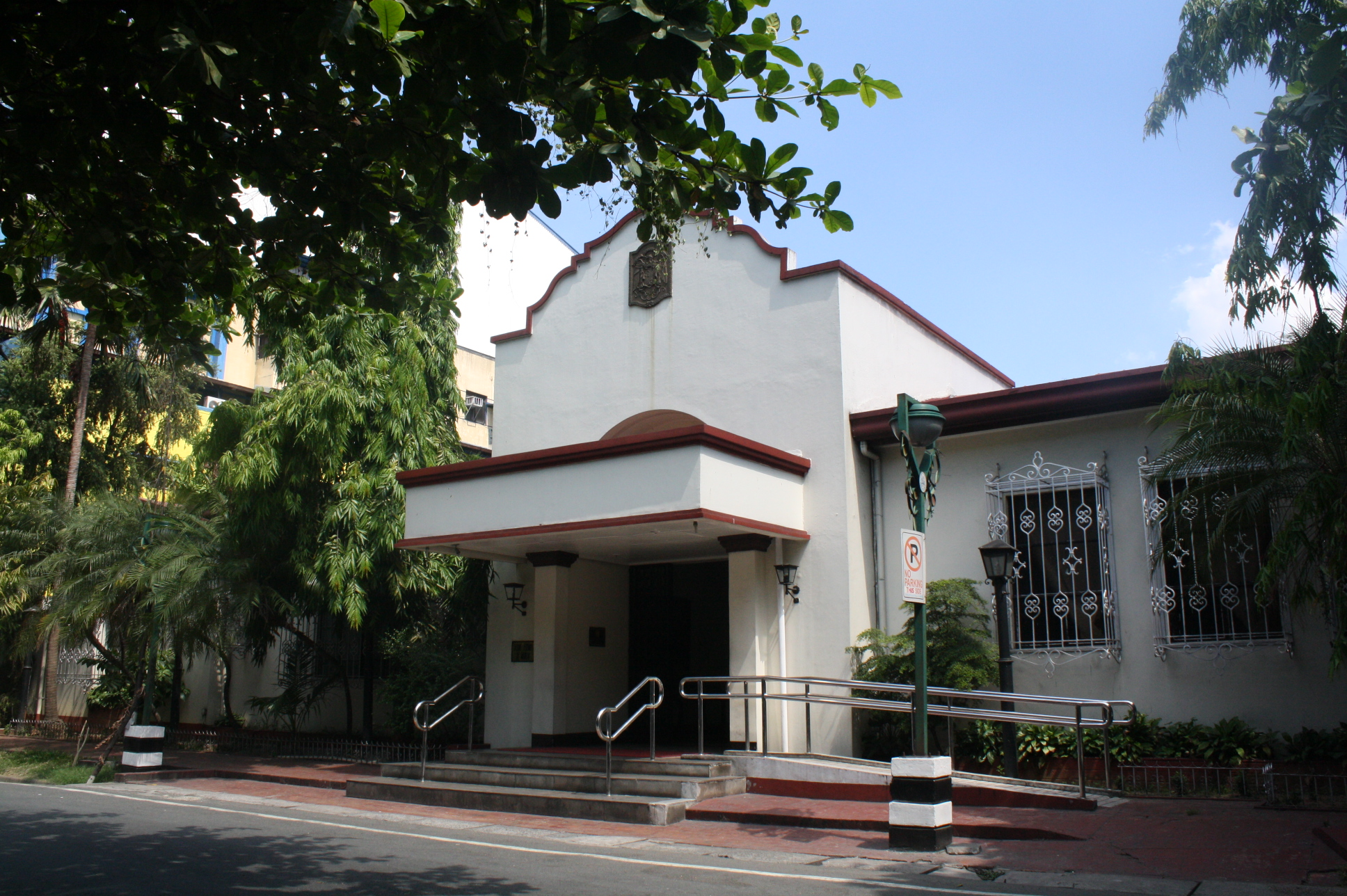
Steps to the main entrance of Casino Español

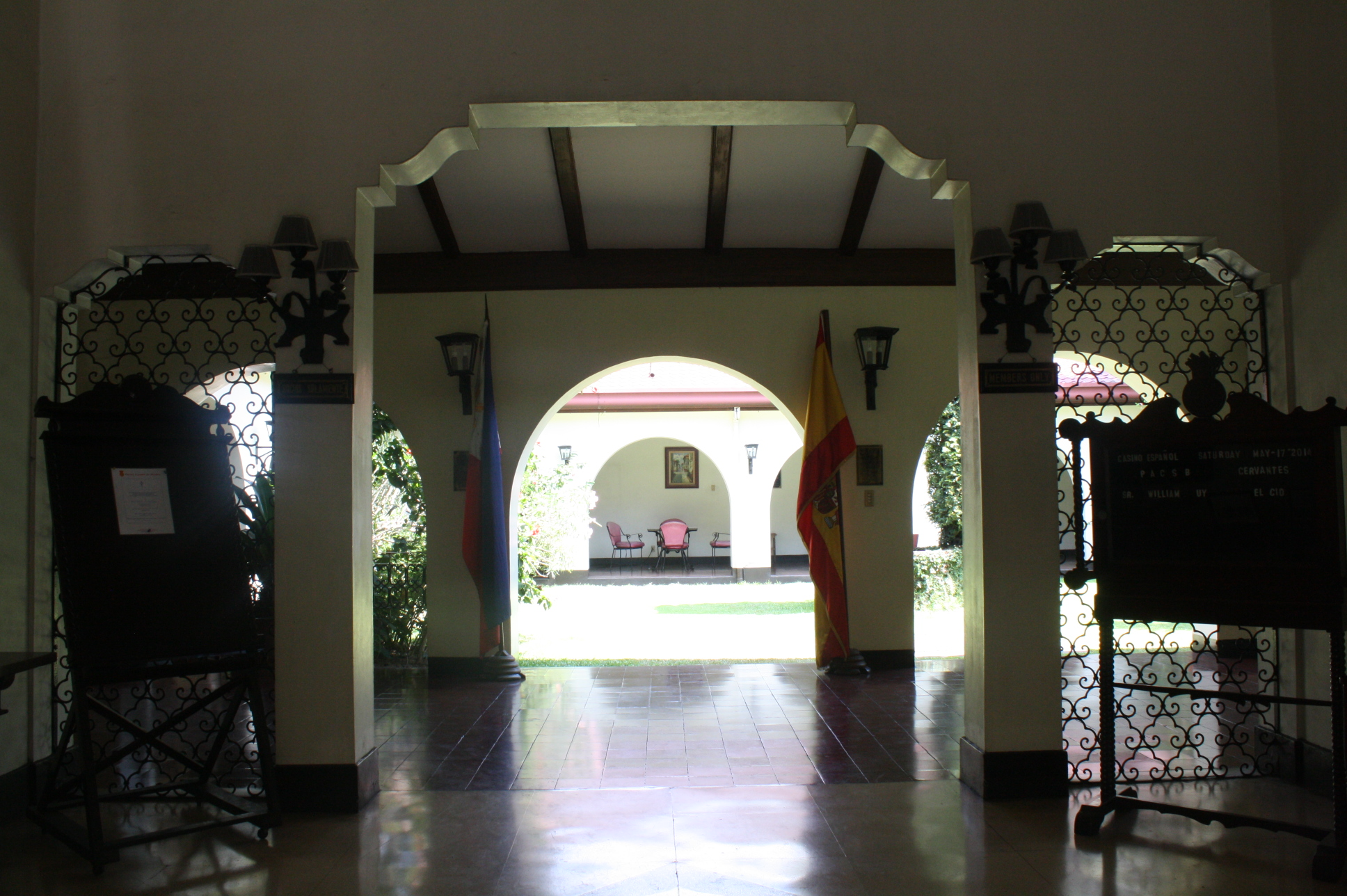
Main lobby that leads to the inner courtyard of Casino Español

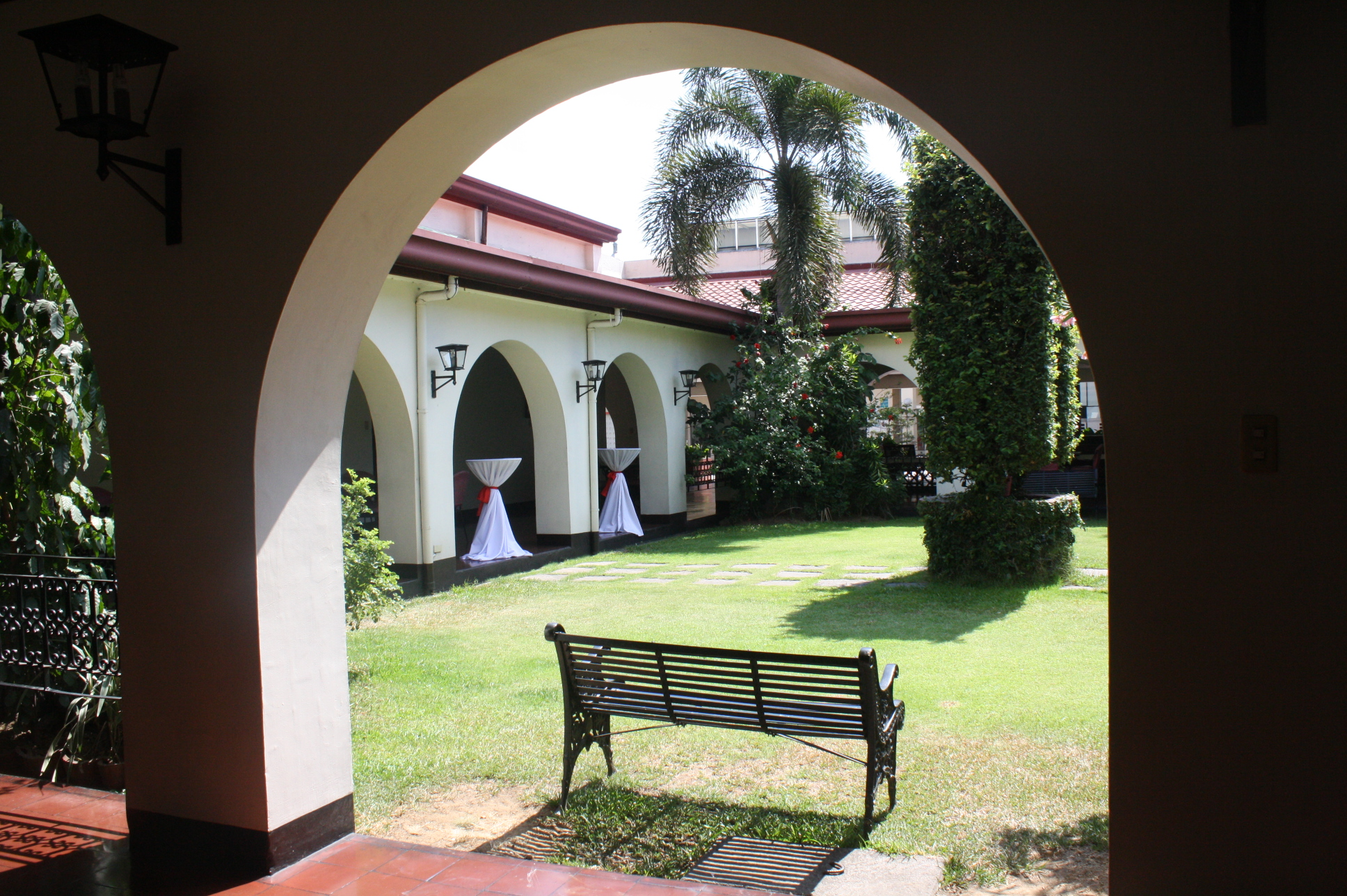
Arched terraces surrounding the courtyard of Casino Español

== See also ==
- Chronology of Casino Español de Manila presidents from its founding
