= Alberto Villareal (footballer, died 2017) =

Filipino footballer

Personal information
- Full name: Alberto Villareal y García
- Date of birth: 1933 or 1934
- Date of death: July 5, 2017 (aged 83)
- Place of death: Vancouver, Canada

College career
Years	Team	Apps	(Gls)
- De La Salle University

Senior career*
Years	Team	Apps	(Gls)
–	YCO Athletic Club		

International career
c. 1954–1956	Philippines		
- * Club domestic league appearances and goals

Alberto Villareal y García (1933 or 1934–July 5, 2017) was a Philippine international footballer who was captain of the Philippine national team that competed at the 1958 Asian Games. He is credited for leading the team that caused a 1-0 upset against host Japan. He was also part of the 1954 Asian Games squad.

Villereal was the eldest of three brothers all of which were national team players. He attended the De La Salle University where he obtained a bachelor's degree on Chemical Engineering. He was the captain of the university's junior and senior varsity team of the 1950s. At the club level, he played for the YCO Athletic Club which won the national championship within the same decade.

He died on July 5, 2017, in Vancouver, Canada, at age 83.
