= Football at the 1925 Far Eastern Championship Games =

1925 Far Eastern Championship Games
Tournament details
- Host country: Philippines
- Teams: 3
- Venue: (in 1 host city)

Final positions
- Champions: China (6th title)

Tournament statistics
- Matches played: 3
- Goals scored: 12 (4 per match)
- Top scorer: (Beiyang government) Lee Wai Tong (5 goals)

The football sporting event at the 1925 Far Eastern Championship Games featured matches between China, Japan and the Philippines.

== Results ==
Team	Pld	W	D	L	GF	GA	GD	Pts
(Beiyang government) China	2	2	0	0	7	1	6	4
Philippines	2	1	0	1	5	5	0	2
Japan	2	0	0	2	0	6	–6	0

18 May 1925

Philippines	4–0	Japan
	Report

Rizal Memorial Stadium, Manila

20 May 1925

Japan	0–2	(Beiyang government) China
	Report	Lee Wai Tong ?', ?'

Rizal Memorial Stadium, Manila

22 May 1925

Philippines	1–5	(Beiyang government) China
? 65' (pen.)	Report	Lee Wai Tong 10', 25', 61'; Pang Wah Hing 15'; Suen Kam Shun 71'

Rizal Memorial Stadium, Manila

== Winner ==
1925 Far Eastern Games Football champions

China
Sixth title

== Statistics ==
=== Goalscorers ===
There were 12 goals scored in 6 matches, for an average of 2 goals per match.

5 goals

- (Beiyang government) Lee Wai Tong

1 goal

- (Beiyang government) Pang Wah Hing
- (Beiyang government) Suen Kam Shun
