= 2019 AFF U-18 Youth Championship squads =

Football tournament squads

The 2019 AFF U-18 Youth Championship is an international football tournament that will be held in Indonesia from 6 to 19 August 2019. The 12 national teams involved in the tournament were required to register a squad of 23 players in which three must be goalkeepers; only players in these squads are eligible to take part in the tournament.

== Group A ==
=== Brunei ===
Head coach: (Singapore) Stephen Ng Heng Seng

No.	Pos.	Player	Date of birth (age)	Club
1	GK	Muhd Noorhaswan Aiman	3 December 2001 (aged 17)	(Football Association of Brunei Darussalam)
18	GK	Abdul Taufik Talip	29 December 2003 (aged 15)	(Football Association of Brunei Darussalam) Kota Ranger
20	GK	Riyan Aiman Jali	9 January 2003 (aged 16)	(Football Association of Brunei Darussalam)
2	DF	Khoirunnaas Khalid	1 July 2000 (aged 19)	(Football Association of Brunei Darussalam) Kasuka
3	DF	Haziq Hafizhan Hardi	24 March 2001 (aged 18)	(Football Association of Brunei Darussalam) Kasuka
4	DF	George Alvin Degat	14 January 2001 (aged 18)	(Football Association of Brunei Darussalam)
5	DF	Daniyal Zinin	15 January 2002 (aged 17)	(Football Association of Brunei Darussalam) DPMM
6	DF	Aisan Aisamuddin Abdullah Aiman	2 February 2002 (aged 17)	(Football Association of Brunei Darussalam) DPMM
12	DF	Maverick Lim Soon Heng	4 June 2003 (aged 16)	(Football Association of Brunei Darussalam) DPMM
15	DF	Mohammad Hafiz Suhardi	10 May 2001 (aged 18)	(Football Association of Brunei Darussalam)
21	DF	Nazhan Zulkifle	17 January 2001 (aged 18)	(Football Association of Brunei Darussalam) Kasuka
22	DF	Mohd Salleh Emzah	23 May 2001 (aged 18)	(Football Association of Brunei Darussalam)
8	MF	Eddy Shahrol Izzat Omar	4 October 2003 (aged 15)	(Football Association of Brunei Darussalam) Kasuka
11	MF	Aisan Aizuddin Abdullah Aiman	2 February 2002 (aged 17)	(Football Association of Brunei Darussalam) Kasuka
13	MF	Abdul Adib Mohd Roslan	27 September 2002 (aged 16)	(Football Association of Brunei Darussalam)
14	MF	Amirul Aizad	29 July 2002 (aged 17)	(Football Association of Brunei Darussalam)
16	MF	Hilmi Sidik	24 October 2003 (aged 15)	(Football Association of Brunei Darussalam) Kasuka
17	MF	Hadif Aiman Adanan	19 October 2001 (aged 17)	(Football Association of Brunei Darussalam) Kasuka
7	FW	Aminuddin Masri	3 February 2002 (aged 17)	(Football Association of Brunei Darussalam) Kota Ranger
9	FW	Syafiq Safiuddin Abdul Shariff	16 June 2002 (aged 17)	(Football Association of Brunei Darussalam) DPMM
19	FW	Rozandy Anak Bujang	28 November 2001 (aged 17)	(Football Association of Brunei Darussalam) Kasuka
21	FW	Muhammad Abdul Wafiq Zulhabri	20 June 2002 (aged 17)	(Football Association of Brunei Darussalam)

=== Indonesia ===
Head coach: Fakhri Husaini

No.	Pos.	Player	Date of birth (age)	Club
1	GK	Adi Satryo	7 July 2001 (aged 18)	(Football Association of Indonesia) PPLP Jakarta
21	GK	Ernando Ari	27 February 2002 (aged 17)	(Football Association of Indonesia) Persebaya
22	GK	Risky Sudirman	2 February 2002 (aged 17)	(Football Association of Indonesia) Persija Jakarta
2	DF	Bagas Kaffa	16 January 2002 (aged 17)	(Football Association of Indonesia) Barito Putera
3	DF	Yudha Febrian	13 February 2002 (aged 17)	(Football Association of Indonesia) Barito Putera
4	DF	Fadhil Aksah	6 February 2001 (aged 18)	(Football Association of Indonesia) PLPP Jakarta
13	DF	Bayu Fiqri	13 January 2001 (aged 18)	(Football Association of Indonesia) Semeru
14	DF	Fajar Fathur Rahman	29 May 2002 (aged 17)	(Football Association of Indonesia) Kalteng Putra
15	DF	Salman Alfarid	16 April 2002 (aged 17)	(Football Association of Indonesia) SKO Ragunan
16	DF	Komang Teguh	28 April 2002 (aged 17)	(Football Association of Indonesia) SKO Ragunan
19	DF	Alfeandra Dewangga	28 June 2001 (aged 18)	(Football Association of Indonesia) PPLP Jateng
23	DF	Rizky Ridho	21 November 2001 (aged 17)	(Football Association of Indonesia) Persebaya
5	MF	Theo Numberi	1 October 2002 (aged 16)	(Football Association of Indonesia) Persipura
6	MF	David Maulana	25 February 2002 (aged 17)	(Football Association of Indonesia) Barito Putera
7	MF	Beckham Putra	29 October 2001 (aged 17)	(Football Association of Indonesia) Persib Bandung
8	MF	Khairul Imam Zakiri	1 April 2001 (aged 18)	(Royal Spanish Football Federation) Leganés
10	MF	Rendy Juliansyah	27 July 2002 (aged 17)	(Royal Spanish Football Federation) Leganés
11	MF	Mochammad Supriadi	23 May 2002 (aged 17)	(Football Association of Indonesia) Persebaya
12	MF	Braif Fatari	1 October 2002 (aged 16)	(Football Association of Indonesia) Persija Jakarta
18	MF	Brylian Aldama	23 February 2002 (aged 17)	(Football Association of Indonesia) Persebaya
9	FW	Sutan Zico	7 April 2002 (aged 17)	(Football Association of Indonesia) Persija Jakarta
17	FW	Saddam Gaffar	24 September 2001 (aged 17)	(Football Association of Indonesia) PSS Sleman
20	FW	Bagus Kahfi	16 January 2002 (aged 17)	(Football Association of Indonesia) Barito Putera

=== Laos ===
Head coach: (Singapore) V. Sundramoorthy

No.	Pos.	Player	Date of birth (age)	Club
1	GK	Solasak Thilavong	3 November 2003 (aged 15)	(Lao Football Federation) Young Elephants
18	GK	Vilaphong Phoumsavath	17 November 2002 (aged 16)	(Lao Football Federation)
19	GK	Bounphalith Phoutthavong Sa	24 August 2001 (aged 17)	(Lao Football Federation)
2	DF	Phonesavanh Keomanyvong	19 January 2002 (aged 17)	(Lao Football Federation) Lao Army
3	DF	Khamsanga Phimmasone	20 April 2001 (aged 18)	(Lao Football Federation) Garuda
4	DF	Songkan Sichanthavong	13 April 2002 (aged 17)	(Lao Football Federation)
5	DF	Anoulack Vannalath	7 March 2002 (aged 17)	(Lao Football Federation) Young Elephants
8	DF	Saleunxay Phommavong	7 August 2004 (aged 14)	(Lao Football Federation) Ezra
15	DF	Xayyasith Koulabsavanh	12 February 2001 (aged 18)	(Lao Football Federation)
16	DF	Channichone Chanthavong	23 October 2002 (aged 16)	(Lao Football Federation)
21	DF	Soukphachan Lueanthala	24 August 2002 (aged 16)	(Lao Football Federation) Viengchanh
6	MF	Thanouthong Kietnalonglop	5 March 2001 (aged 18)	(Lao Football Federation) Vientiane FT
7	MF	Souphan Khambaion	30 January 2002 (aged 17)	(Lao Football Federation) Garuda
11	MF	Lekto Louang Aphay	10 June 2002 (aged 17)	(Lao Football Federation) Evo United
12	MF	Bounmy Pinkeo	29 September 2002 (aged 16)	(Lao Football Federation)
17	MF	Kouaycheng Nouphakdy	3 January 2001 (aged 18)	(Lao Football Federation)
20	MF	Thongsavan Vannaxay	30 August 2001 (aged 17)	(Lao Football Federation)
22	MF	Phouvieng Phounsavath	12 December 2002 (aged 16)	(Lao Football Federation)
23	MF	Alounnay Lounlasy	8 July 2003 (aged 16)	(Lao Football Federation)
9	FW	Akkhom Thoranin	10 December 2002 (aged 16)	(Lao Football Federation) Lao Toyota
10	FW	Chony Wenpaserth	27 November 2002 (aged 16)	(Lao Football Federation) Ezra
13	FW	Tee Sihalath	20 March 2002 (aged 17)	(Lao Football Federation) Lao Army
14	FW	Koukky Phomhalath	12 January 2001 (aged 18)	(Lao Football Federation)

=== Myanmar ===
Head coach: (Myanmar) Soe Myat Min

No.	Pos.	Player	Date of birth (age)	Club
1	GK	Nay Lin Htet	13 April 2002 (aged 17)	(Myanmar Football Federation)
18	GK	Pyae Phyo Thu	21 October 2002 (aged 16)	(Myanmar Football Federation) Yadanarbon
22	GK	Saw Htet	30 September 2001 (aged 17)	(Myanmar Football Federation)
2	DF	Wai Yan Soe	15 April 2002 (aged 17)	(Myanmar Football Federation)
3	DF	Sithu Moe Khant	18 April 2001 (aged 18)	(Myanmar Football Federation) Hantharwady United
4	DF	Thet Hein Soe	29 September 2001 (aged 17)	(Myanmar Football Federation) Yadanarbon
5	DF	Nyan Lin Htet	20 January 2002 (aged 17)	(Myanmar Football Federation) Yangon United
13	DF	Saw Htaw Nay Mue	19 June 2001 (aged 18)	(Myanmar Football Federation) Ayeyawady United
15	DF	Shin Thant Aung	31 May 2002 (aged 17)	(Myanmar Football Federation) Hantharwady United
19	DF	Naung Naung Soe	1 October 2002 (aged 16)	(Myanmar Football Federation) Mandalay Football Academy
21	DF	Kaung Khant Kyaw	15 June 2002 (aged 17)	(Myanmar Football Federation)
6	MF	Yan Kyaw Soe	4 January 2002 (aged 17)	(Myanmar Football Federation) Mandalay Football Academy
7	MF	Zaw Win Thein	1 March 2003 (aged 16)	(Myanmar Football Federation) Junior Lions
8	MF	Aung Ko Oo	17 February 2002 (aged 17)	(Myanmar Football Federation)
11	MF	Pyae Phyo Aung	13 May 2002 (aged 17)	(Myanmar Football Federation)
12	MF	Moe Swe	31 May 2003 (aged 16)	(Myanmar Football Federation)
14	MF	Ye Min Kyaw	2 February 2001 (aged 18)	(Myanmar Football Federation)
17	MF	Khun Kyaw Zin Hein	15 July 2002 (aged 17)	(Myanmar Football Federation) Hantharwady United
9	FW	La Min Htwe	10 March 2003 (aged 16)	(Myanmar Football Federation)
10	FW	Saw Kyaw Ae	5 June 2001 (aged 18)	(Myanmar Football Federation) Yangon United
16	FW	Nyi Nyi	25 January 2001 (aged 18)	(Myanmar Football Federation) Kachin United
20	FW	Aw Bar Kha	16 February 2001 (aged 18)	(Myanmar Football Federation)
23	FW	Hein Htet Aung	5 October 2001 (aged 17)	(Myanmar Football Federation) Hantharwady United

== Group B ==
=== Australia ===
Head coach: Gary van Egmond

No.	Pos.	Player	Date of birth (age)	Caps	Goals	Club
1	GK	Noah James	14 February 2001 (age 25)	1	0	(Football Australia) Newcastle Jets
12	GK	Jackson Lee	10 September 2001 (age 25)	0	0	(Football Australia) Perth Glory
18	GK	Kai Calderbank-Park	16 January 2001 (age 25)	0	0	(The Football Association) Burnley
2	DF	Thomas Aquilina	2 February 2001 (age 25)	1	0	(Football Australia) Sutherland Sharks
3	DF	Alec Mills	24 February 2001 (age 25)	1	0	(Football Australia) Melbourne City
5	DF	Thomas Fay	9 March 2001 (age 25)	1	0	(Football Australia) Sydney FC
13	DF	Kai Trewin	18 May 2001 (age 25)	1	1	(Football Australia) Brisbane Roar
15	DF	Noah Pagden	20 March 2001 (age 25)	1	0	(Football Australia) Western Sydney Wanderers
16	DF	Bradley Chick	19 February 2001 (age 25)	1	0	(Football Australia) Melbourne City
4	MF	Kristian Popovic	14 August 2001 (age 25)	0	0	(Football Australia) Perth Glory
6	MF	Louis D'Arrigo	23 September 2001 (age 25)	0	0	(Football Australia) Adelaide United
8	MF	Fabian Monge	12 July 2001 (age 25)	3	1	(Football Australia) Western Sydney Wanderers
11	MF	Lochlan Constable	21 May 2001 (age 25)	0	0	(Football Australia) Western Sydney Wanderers
14	MF	Ryan Goodhew	25 March 2001 (age 25)	0	0	(Football Australia) Newcastle Jets
21	MF	Jake Hollman	26 August 2001 (age 25)	1	0	(Football Australia) Sydney FC
23	MF	Jai King	11 September 2001 (age 25)	1	0	(Football Australia) Adelaide United
7	FW	Jarrod Carluccio	8 February 2001 (age 25)	1	0	(Football Australia) Western Sydney Wanderers
9	FW	Harry McCarthy	13 November 2001 (age 24)	1	1	(Football Australia) Manly United
10	FW	Dylan Ruiz-Diaz	12 March 2001 (age 25)	1	1	(Football Australia) Central Coast Mariners
17	FW	Marco Tilio	23 August 2001 (age 25)	0	0	(Football Australia) Sydney FC
19	FW	Gianluca Iannucci	18 June 2001 (age 25)	0	0	(Football Australia) Melbourne City
20	FW	Lachlan Brook	8 February 2001 (age 25)	0	0	(Football Australia) Adelaide United
22	FW	Lleyton Brooks	20 March 2001 (age 25)	1	2	(Football Australia) Brisbane Roar

=== Malaysia ===
Head coach: (Australia) Brad Maloney

No.	Pos.	Player	Date of birth (age)	Caps	Goals	Club
1	GK	Firdaus Irman	23 July 2001 (age 25)			(Football Association of Malaysia) PKNP
22	GK	Riezman Irfan	26 September 2001 (age 25)			(Football Association of Malaysia) Pahang
23	GK	Sikh Izhan	23 March 2002 (age 24)			(Football Association of Malaysia) Mokhtar Dahari Academy
2	DF	Firdaus Ramli	10 March 2002 (age 24)			(Football Association of Malaysia) Mokhtar Dahari Academy
3	DF	Wazif Nazarail	22 February 2001 (age 25)			(Football Association of Malaysia) Felda United
4	DF	Azrin Afiq	1 January 2002 (age 24)			(Football Association of Malaysia) Mokhtar Dahari Academy
12	DF	Aidil Azuan	25 February 2001 (age 25)			(Football Association of Malaysia) PKNP
14	DF	Zikri Khalili	25 June 2002 (age 24)			(Football Association of Malaysia) Mokhtar Dahari Academy
15	DF	Nuh Azlan	25 July 2002 (age 24)			(Football Association of Malaysia) Mokhtar Dahari Academy
19	DF	Fahmi Daniel	1 February 2002 (age 24)			(Football Association of Malaysia) Mokhtar Dahari Academy
5	MF	Harith Haiqal	22 June 2002 (age 24)			(Football Association of Malaysia) Mokhtar Dahari Academy
6	MF	Azam Azmi	12 February 2001 (age 25)			(Football Association of Malaysia) Terengganu
7	MF	Mukhairi Ajmal	7 November 2001 (age 24)			(Football Association of Malaysia) PKNP
8	MF	Firdaus Kaironnisam	10 December 2002 (age 23)			(Football Association of Malaysia) Mokhtar Dahari Academy
9	MF	Muslihuddin Atiq	31 December 2001 (age 24)			(Football Association of Malaysia) Terengganu
11	MF	Faris Kamardin	4 March 2001 (age 25)			(Football Association of Malaysia) Selangor
13	MF	Fakrul Iman	29 March 2001 (age 25)			(Football Association of Malaysia) Selangor
16	MF	Umar Hakeem	26 August 2002 (age 24)			(Football Association of Malaysia) Mokhtar Dahari Academy
17	MF	Alan Lagang Keryer	17 January 2001 (age 25)			(Football Association of Malaysia) Sarawak
20	MF	Aiman Afif	18 February 2001 (age 25)			(Football Association of Malaysia) Kedah
21	MF	Akmal Hazim	22 April 2001 (age 25)			(Football Association of Malaysia) Perak
10	FW	Luqman Hakim Shamsudin	5 March 2002 (age 24)			(Football Association of Malaysia) Mokhtar Dahari Academy
18	FW	Nasip Zain	7 July 2001 (age 25)			(Football Association of Malaysia) Sabah

=== Singapore ===
Head coach: Gareth Low

No.	Pos.	Player	Date of birth (age)	Caps	Goals	Club
1	GK	Prathip S/O Ekamparam	21 August 2001 (age 25)	4	0	(Football Association of Singapore) Home United
18	GK	Oliver Sim	9 June 2001 (age 25)	1	0	(Football Association of Singapore) Home United
23	GK	Wayne Chew	22 October 2001 (age 24)	0	0	(Football Association of Singapore) Geylang International
2	DF	Sahffee Jubpre	31 March 2001 (age 25)	3	0	(Football Association of Singapore) Hougang United
3	DF	Fudhil I’yadh	18 August 2001 (age 25)	1	0	(Football Association of Singapore) Home United
4	DF	Nur Adam Abdullah	13 April 2001 (age 25)	5	0	(Football Association of Singapore) Garena Young Lions
6	DF	Ryaan Sanizal	31 May 2002 (age 24)	5	0	(Football Association of Singapore) Tampines Rovers
12	DF	Danish Iftiqar	16 September 2001 (age 25)	2	0	(Football Association of Singapore) Home United
13	DF	Danial Azman	15 January 2001 (age 25)	2	0	(Football Association of Singapore) Home United
16	DF	Danial Scott Crichton	11 April 2003 (age 23)	4	0	(Football Association of Singapore) Warriors
20	DF	Harhys Stewart	20 March 2001 (age 25)	4	0	(Football Association of Singapore) Hougang United
25	DF	Fathullah Rahmat	5 September 2002 (age 24)	3	0	(Football Association of Singapore) Tampines Rovers
5	MF	Zamani Zamri	31 May 2001 (age 25)	5	1	(Football Association of Singapore) Albirex Niigata (S)
7	MF	Ong Yu En	3 October 2003 (age 23)	3	0	(Football Association of Singapore) Singapore Sports School
10	MF	Rasaq Akeem	16 June 2001 (age 25)	5	0	(Football Association of Singapore) Garena Young Lions
11	MF	Haziq Kamarudin	6 March 2001 (age 25)	3	0	(Football Association of Singapore) Home United
15	MF	Farhan Zulkifli	10 November 2002 (age 23)	5	0	(Football Association of Singapore) Hougang United
17	MF	Iman Hakim	9 March 2002 (age 24)	4	0	(Football Association of Singapore) Singapore Sports School
19	MF	Anaqi Ismit	24 August 2001 (age 25)	2	0	(Football Association of Singapore) Home United
21	MF	Danish Qayyum	2 February 2002 (age 24)	2	1	(Football Association of Singapore) Geylang International
22	MF	Azri Suhaili	12 July 2002 (age 24)	3	1	(Football Association of Singapore) Geylang International
9	FW	Zikos Chua	15 April 2002 (age 24)	1	0	(Football Association of Singapore) Geylang International
24	FW	Syahadat Masnawi	7 November 2001 (age 24)	1	0	(Football Association of Singapore) Garena Young Lions

=== Thailand ===
Head coach: Issara Sritaro

No.	Pos.	Player	Date of birth (age)	Caps	Goals	Club
1	GK	Soponwit Rakyart	25 January 2001 (age 25)			(Football Association of Thailand) Muangthong United
18	GK	Thirawooth Sruanson	10 November 2001 (age 24)			(Football Association of Thailand) Muangthong United
23	GK	Natthawut Paengkratok	1 February 2002 (age 24)			(Football Association of Thailand) Assumption United
2	DF	Phongsakorn Trisat	19 March 2001 (age 25)			(Football Association of Thailand) Chonburi
3	DF	Nitibodin Makot	15 May 2001 (age 25)			(Football Association of Thailand) Assumption United
4	DF	Chiraphong Raksongkham	19 June 2001 (age 25)			(Football Association of Thailand) Pattana
5	DF	Kritsada Nontharat	16 February 2001 (age 25)			(Football Association of Thailand) Trat
6	DF	Kritsana Daokrajai	13 March 2001 (age 25)			(Football Association of Thailand) Buriram United
16	DF	Kritsanapol Booncharee	26 March 2001 (age 25)			(Football Association of Thailand) Pattana
19	DF	Anatcha Thepsiri	18 May 2002 (age 24)			(Football Association of Thailand) Nongbua Pitchaya
20	DF	Jakkapong Sanmahung	6 April 2002 (age 24)			(Football Association of Thailand) Chonburi
7	MF	Channarong Promsrikaew (captain)	17 April 2001 (age 25)			(Football Association of Thailand) Chonburi
8	MF	Natcha Promsomboon	8 February 2001 (age 25)			(Football Association of Thailand) Pattana
10	MF	Purachet Thodsanit	9 May 2001 (age 25)			(Football Association of Thailand) Muangthong United
11	MF	Chatmongkol Rueangthanarot	9 May 2002 (age 24)			(Football Association of Thailand) Chonburi
12	MF	Thana Isor	20 March 2001 (age 25)			(Football Association of Thailand) Assumption United
13	MF	Pharadon Phatthaphon	23 September 2001 (age 25)			(Football Association of Thailand) Chiangrai City
15	MF	Thanadol Kaosaart	18 August 2001 (age 25)			(Football Association of Thailand) Buriram United
17	MF	Thirapak Prueangna	15 August 2001 (age 25)			(Football Association of Thailand) Buriram United
9	FW	Sitthinan Rungrueang	10 August 2002 (age 24)			(Football Association of Thailand) Ratchaburi Mitr Phol
14	FW	Phoochit Petcharat	6 August 2002 (age 24)			(Football Association of Thailand) Pattana
21	FW	Guntapon Keereeleang	22 January 2001 (age 25)			(Football Association of Thailand) Bangkok United
22	FW	Achitpol Keereerom	21 October 2001 (age 24)			(German Football Association) TSV 1860 Rosenheim

=== Vietnam ===
Head coach: Hoàng Anh Tuấn

No.	Pos.	Player	Date of birth (age)	Club
1	GK	Y Êli Niê	1 August 2001 (age 25)	(Vietnam Football Federation) Đắk Lắk
23	GK	Nguyễn Văn Bá	26 June 2001 (age 25)	(Vietnam Football Federation) Sông Lam Nghệ An
2	DF	Vũ Tiến Long	4 April 2002 (age 24)	(Vietnam Football Federation) Hà Nội
4	DF	Trịnh Quang Trường	2 February 2002 (age 24)	(Vietnam Football Federation) PVF
5	DF	Trần Hoàng Phúc	28 April 2001 (age 25)	(Vietnam Football Federation) PVF
6	DF	Hồ Khắc Lương	1 October 2001 (age 25)	(Vietnam Football Federation) Sông Lam Nghệ An
12	DF	Phan Tuấn Tài	1 July 2001 (age 25)	(Vietnam Football Federation) Viettel
20	DF	Nguyễn Nhĩ Khang	16 February 2001 (age 25)	(Vietnam Football Federation) Hoàng Anh Gia Lai
21	DF	Nguyễn Đình Huyên	12 August 2001 (age 25)	(Vietnam Football Federation) FLC Thanh Hóa
22	DF	Vương Văn Huy	8 October 2001 (age 25)	(Vietnam Football Federation) Sông Lam Nghệ An
3	MF	Võ Minh Trọng	24 October 2001 (age 24)	(Vietnam Football Federation) An Giang
7	MF	Nguyễn Xuân Bình	24 May 2001 (age 25)	(Vietnam Football Federation) Sông Lam Nghệ An
8	MF	Đặng Quang Tú	13 June 2001 (age 25)	(Vietnam Football Federation) Sông Lam Nghệ An
10	MF	Huỳnh Công Đến	19 August 2001 (age 25)	(Vietnam Football Federation) PVF
14	MF	Nguyễn Ngọc Tú	13 January 2002 (age 24)	(Vietnam Football Federation) Viettel
16	MF	Trần Mạnh Quỳnh	18 January 2001 (age 25)	(Vietnam Football Federation) Sông Lam Nghệ An
19	MF	Phạm Văn Hữu	6 March 2001 (age 25)	(Vietnam Football Federation) SHB Đà Nẵng
24	MF	Nguyễn Hữu Nam	1 January 2001 (age 25)	(Vietnam Football Federation) Viettel
9	FW	Bùi Tiến Sinh	3 October 2001 (age 25)	(Vietnam Football Federation) Viettel
11	FW	Võ Nguyên Hoàng	2 July 2002 (age 24)	(Vietnam Football Federation) PVF
15	FW	Nguyễn Kim Nhật	9 February 2001 (age 25)	(Vietnam Football Federation) Viettel
17	FW	Phạm Xuân Tạo	20 January 2001 (age 25)	(Vietnam Football Federation) SHB Đà Nẵng
18	FW	Nguyễn Hữu Tiệp	14 May 2002 (age 24)	(Vietnam Football Federation) Viettel
