= 2019–20 in Australian soccer =

51st season of national competitive soccer in Australia

Soccer in Australia
- Season: 2019–20

Men's soccer
- A-League Premiership: Sydney FC
- A-League Championship: Sydney FC
- National Premier Leagues: Wollongong Wolves
- FFA Cup: Adelaide United

Women's soccer
- W-League Premiership: Melbourne City
- W-League Championship: Melbourne City

The 2019–20 season was the 51st season of national competitive soccer in Australia and 137th overall.

Most events from March 2020 onwards were disrupted or postponed due to impacts from the COVID-19 pandemic in Australia.

== National teams ==
=== Australia men's national soccer team ===
==== 2022 FIFA World Cup qualification / 2023 AFC Asian Cup qualification ====
===== Second round =====
10 September 2019 Group B	Kuwait	0–3	Australia	Kuwait City, Kuwait
18:30 UTC+3		Report	Leckie 7', 30'; Mooy 38'	Stadium: Al Kuwait Sports Club Stadium; Attendance: 11,852; Referee: Muhammad Taqi (Singapore)

10 October 2019 Group B	Australia	5–0	Nepal	Canberra, Australia
20:00 UTC+11	Maclaren 6', 19', 90'; Souttar 23', 59'	Report		Stadium: Canberra Stadium; Attendance: 18,563; Referee: Thoriq Munir Alkatiri (Indonesia)

15 October 2019 Group B	Chinese Taipei	1–7	Australia	Kaohsiung, Taiwan
19:10 UTC+8	Y.W. Chen 21'	Report	Taggart 12', 19'; Irvine 34', 37'; Maclaren 84'; Souttar 73', 89'	Stadium: National Stadium; Attendance: 3,217; Referee: Mongkolchai Pechsri (Thailand)

14 November 2019 Group B	Jordan	0–1	Australia	Amman, Jordan
18:00 UTC+2		Report	Taggart 13'	Stadium: King Abdullah II Stadium; Attendance: 9,712; Referee: Fu Ming (China)

=== Australia men's national under-23 soccer team ===
==== Friendlies ====
The following is a list of friendlies played by the men's under 23 national team in 2019–20.

6 September 2019	Australia	1–1	New Zealand	Wollongong, Australia
19:30 AEST	McGree 56'	Report	Lewis 71'	Stadium: WIN Stadium

9 September 2019	Australia	1–1	New Zealand	Sydney, Australia
19:30 AEST	Wales 3'	Report	Rogerson 45'	Stadium: Campbelltown Stadium

14 October 2019	Australia	1–2	Iran	Doha, Qatar
	Armenakas 46' (pen.)	Report (AUS); Report (IRN)	Aghasi 4'; Shojaei 25'	Stadium: Al-Duhail Stadium

15 November 2019 Dazu Rock Carvings Cup	China	1–5	Australia	Chongqing, China
19:30 CST	Zhang 45'	Report	Bouman 20'; Italiano 30'; Toure 33'; Najjarine 63'; Folami 85'	Stadium: Chongqing City Dazu District Sports Centre Stadium

17 November 2019 Dazu Rock Carvings Cup	Australia	4–0	North Korea	Chongqing, China
16:00 CST	Duncan 30'; Piscopo 60'; Mourdoukoutas (?); Bouman 90'	Report		Stadium: Chongqing City Dazu District Sports Centre Stadium

19 November 2019 Dazu Rock Carvings Cup	Australia	1–0	Lithuania	Chongqing, China
16:00 CST	Najjarine 58' (pen.)	Report		Stadium: Chongqing City Dazu District Sports Centre Stadium

3 January 2020	Australia	1–1	South Korea	Kuala Lumpur, Malaysia
17:00 MYT	Toure 75'	Report	72'	Stadium: Kuala Lumpur Stadium; Attendance: 0 (behind closed doors)

==== 2020 AFC U-23 Championship ====
Matches also acted as qualification for the 2020 Olympic Games .

8 January 2020 Group stage	Iraq	1–1	Australia	Rangsit, Thailand
17:15 ICT	Nassif 77'	Report	Piscopo 62'	Stadium: Thammasat Stadium; Attendance: 106; Referee: Fu Ming (China)

11 January 2020 Group stage	Thailand	1–2	Australia	Bangkok, Thailand
20:15 ICT	Anon 24'	Report	D'Agostino 43', 76'	Stadium: Rajamangala Stadium; Attendance: 22,352; Referee: Turki Al-Khudhayr (Saudi Arabia)

14 January 2020 Group stage	Australia	1–1	Bahrain	Rangsit, Thailand
20:15 ICT	Najjarine 34'	Report	Marhoon 45+3'	Stadium: Thammasat Stadium; Referee: Mohammed Abdulla Hassan Mohamed (United Arab Emirates)

18 January 2020 Quarter-final	Australia	1–0 (a.e.t.)	Syria	Bangkok, Thailand
20:15 ICT	Toure 102'	Report		Stadium: Rajamangala Stadium; Referee: Ryuji Sato (Japan)

22 January 2020 Semi-final	Australia	0–2	South Korea	Rangsit, Thailand
20:15 ICT		Report	D.W. Kim 56'; D.G. Lee 76'	Stadium: Thammasat Stadium; Referee: Nawaf Shukralla (Bahrain)

25 January 2020 Third place match	Australia	1–0	Uzbekistan	Bangkok, Thailand
19:30 ICT	D'Agostino 47'	Report		Stadium: Rajamangala Stadium; Attendance: 590; Referee: Mohammed Abdulla Hassan Mohamed (United Arab Emirates)

=== Australia men's national under-20 soccer team ===
==== AFF U-18 Youth Championship ====
7 August 2019 Group stage	Cambodia	1–5	Australia	Ho Chi Minh City, Vietnam
18:30 ICT	Chanthea 74'	Report	Trewin 3'; Ruiz-Diaz 5'; McCarthy 19'; Brooks 65', 90+3'	Stadium: Thống Nhất Stadium; Attendance: 295; Referee: Xaypaseuth Phongsanit (Laos)

9 August 2019 Group stage	Vietnam	1–4	Australia	Ho Chi Minh City, Vietnam
18:30 ICT	Hoàng 45'	Report	Tilio 1', 34', 90'; Brook 13'	Stadium: Thống Nhất Stadium; Attendance: 4,535; Referee: Souei Vongkham (Laos)

11 August 2019 Group stage	Australia	3–1	Thailand	Thủ Dầu Một, Vietnam
18:30 ICT	Ruiz-Diaz 57', 78'; Carluccio 68'	Report	Natcha 82'	Stadium: Gò Đậu Stadium; Attendance: 418; Referee: Clifford Daypuyat (Philippines)

13 August 2019 Group stage	Australia	0–3	Malaysia	Ho Chi Minh City, Vietnam
15:30 ICT		Report	Luqman 17', 39'; Azam 27'	Stadium: Thành Long Stadium; Attendance: 300; Referee: Souei Vongkham (Laos)

15 August 2019 Group stage	Singapore	0–5	Australia	Ho Chi Minh City, Vietnam
15:30 ICT		Report	Monge 23'; Ruiz-Diaz 35', 39', 79'; Iannucci 73'	Stadium: Thống Nhất Stadium; Attendance: 356; Referee: Mongkolchai Pechsri (Thailand)

17 August 2019 Semi-final	Australia	2–1	Myanmar	Thủ Dầu Một, Vietnam
19:30 ICT	Brook 56'; Trewin 77'	Report	La Min Htwe 18'	Stadium: Gò Đậu Stadium; Attendance: 251; Referee: Ahmad A'qashah (Singapore)

19 August 2019 Final	Malaysia	0–1	Australia	Ho Chi Minh City, Vietnam
19:30 ICT		Report	Brook 79'	Stadium: Thống Nhất Stadium; Attendance: 859; Referee: Ngô Duy Lân (Vietnam)

==== AFC U-19 Championship qualification ====
6 November 2019 Qualification Stage	Australia	2–2	Laos	Kaohsiung, Taiwan
16:00 Taiwan NST	Ruiz-Diaz 65'; Carluccio 78'	Report	Kietnalonglop 16'; Xaypanya 45'	Stadium: National Stadium; Attendance: 55; Referee: Bijan Heidari (Iran)

8 November 2019 Qualification Stage	Macau	0–6	Australia	Kaohsiung, Taiwan
16:00 Taiwan NST		Report	del Grosso 5'; Roberts 37'; Tilio 40', 55', 67'; Iannucci 49'	Stadium: National Stadium; Attendance: 55; Referee: Sherzod Kasimov (Uzbekistan)

10 November 2019 Qualification Stage	Chinese Taipei	0–5	Australia	Kaohsiung, Taiwan
19:00 Taiwan NST		Report	Brook 2'; Roberts 12', 77'; Hu-Josefsson 33' (o.g.); Tilio 52'	Stadium: National Stadium; Attendance: 694; Referee: Timur Faizullin (Kyrgyzstan)

=== Australia men's national under-17 soccer team ===
==== Friendlies ====
The following is a list of friendlies played by the men's under 17 national team in 2019–20.

6 September 2019	England	3–2	Australia	Hinckley, England
19:00 (UTC+0)	Mighten 20', 36', 65'	Report	Botic 5'; Ostler	Stadium: Leicester Road Stadium; Attendance: 527

8 September 2019	Australia	3–3 (4–3 p)	South Korea	Burton upon Trent, England
13:00 (UTC+0)	Ruhs 12'; Auglah 21'; Kirdar 35'	Report (Twitter); Report (FTBL)	Hong 22'; Kim 69'; Choi 76'	Stadium: St. George's Park; Referee: Alan Young (England)

10 September 2019	Australia	0–4	Brazil	Burton upon Trent, England
15:00 (UTC+0)		Report	Courtney-Perkins (o.g.); Peglow; Kaio; Diego Rosa	Stadium: St. George's Park

==== FIFA U-17 World Cup ====
26 October 2019 Group stage	Ecuador	2–1	Australia	Goiânia, Brazil
20:00 (UTC-3)	Pluas 4'; Mlinaric 9' (o.g.)	Report	Botic 90'	Stadium: Estádio Olímpico; Attendance: 337; Referee: Andreas Ekberg (Sweden)

29 October 2019 Group stage	Australia	2–2	Hungary	Goiânia, Brazil
20:00 (UTC-3)	Botic 69' (pen.); Watts 74'	Report	Baráth 14'; Zuigéber 20' (pen.)	Stadium: Estádio Olímpico; Attendance: 233; Referee: Amin Mohamed (Egypt)

1 November 2019 Group stage	Australia	2–1	Nigeria	Gama, Brazil
17:00 (UTC-3)	Botic 13', 54' (pen.)	Report	Olawale 21'	Stadium: Estádio Bezerrão; Attendance: 851; Referee: István Kovács (Romania)

6 November 2019 Round of 16	France	4–0	Australia	Goiânia, Brazil
20:00 (UTC-3)	Mbuku 6', 74', 82'; Millot 87'	Report		Stadium: Estádio da Serrinha; Attendance: 814; Referee: Claudia Umpiérrez (Uruguay)

==== Younger cohort: AFF U-15 Youth Championship ====
28 July 2019 Group stage	Cambodia	1–3	Australia	Chonburi, Thailand
15:30	Nora 64' (pen.)	Report	D'Argenio 12'; Helweh 24', 30'	Stadium: Chonburi Campus Stadium 2 Referee: Soe Lin Aung (Myanmar)

30 July 2019 Group stage	Laos	0–3	Australia	Chonburi, Thailand
15:00		Report	Menelaou 33'; Oliveira 75'; Segecic 80'	Stadium: Chonburi Campus Stadium 1 Attendance: 75; Referee: Yudi Nurcahya (Indonesia)

1 August 2019 Group stage	Australia	0–3	Malaysia	Chonburi, Thailand
15:00		Report	Daniel 4' (pen.); Nabil 28'; Izrin 70'	Stadium: Chonburi Campus Stadium 1 Attendance: 80; Referee: Steve Supresencia (Philippines)

3 August 2019 Group stage	Thailand	1–1	Australia	Chonburi, Thailand
18:00	Theekawin 40'	Report	Taylor 4'	Stadium: Chonburi Campus Stadium 1 Attendance: 550; Referee: Yudi Nurcahya (Indonesia)

5 August 2019 Group stage	Brunei	0–4	Australia	Chonburi, Thailand
15:30		Report	Mostofi 20', 65'; Gomez 32'; Oliveira 54'	Stadium: Chonburi Campus Stadium 2 Attendance: 93; Referee: Soe Lin Aung (Myanmar)

==== Younger cohort: AFC U-16 Championship qualification ====
16 September 2019 Group stage	Mongolia	1–2	Australia	Hanoi, Vietnam
18:00 (ICT)	Damdindorj 65'	Report	Delgernasan 3' (o.g.); Batsukh 15' (o.g.)	Stadium: National Youth Football Training Centre; Attendance: 105; Referee: Ali Reda (Lebanon)

18 September 2019 Group stage	Australia	3–0	Macau	Hanoi, Vietnam
16:00 (ICT)	Nguyen 9', 44'; Leong 27' (o.g.)	Report		Stadium: National Youth Football Training Centre; Attendance: 30; Referee: Ammar Mahfoodh (Bahrain)

20 September 2019 Group stage	Timor-Leste	0–1	Australia	Hanoi, Vietnam
16:00 (ICT)		Report	Rawlins 45+1'	Stadium: National Youth Football Training Centre; Attendance: 92; Referee: Ahmad Al-Ali (Kuwait)

22 September 2019 Group stage	Vietnam	1–2	Australia	Hanoi, Vietnam
18:00 (ICT)	Oliveira 58' (pen.); Smyth 89'	Report	Nguyễn Công Sơn 19'	Stadium: National Youth Football Training Centre; Attendance: 683; Referee: Zaid Thamer (Iraq)

=== Australia women's national soccer team ===
==== Friendlies ====
The following is a list of friendlies played or originally scheduled to be played by the women's senior national team in 2019–20.

9 November 2019	Australia	2–1	Chile	Sydney, Australia
15:00 AEDT	Kerr 3', 72'	Report	Sáez 89'	Stadium: Bankwest Stadium; Attendance: 20,029; Referee: Rebecca Durcau (Australia)

12 November 2019	Australia	1–0	Chile	Adelaide, Australia
19:30 ACDT	Gielnik 23'	Report		Stadium: Coopers Stadium; Attendance: 10,340; Referee: Anna-Marie Keighley (New Zealand)

10 April 2020	United States	Cancelled	Australia	Sandy, United States
21:30 ET		Cancellation		Stadium: Rio Tinto Stadium

14 April 2020	Canada	Cancelled	Australia	Vancouver, Canada
19:30 PST		Cancellation		Stadium: BC Place

==== 2020 AFC Women's Olympic qualifying tournament ====
7 February 2020 Third round	Australia	7–0	Chinese Taipei	Sydney, Australia
19:30 AEDT	Foord 10', 24', 38'; Catley 31'; Raso 54'; Kerr 64'; Gorry 90+2'	Report		Stadium: Campbelltown Stadium; Referee: Oh Hyeon-jeong (South Korea)

10 February 2020 Third round	Australia	6–0	Thailand	Sydney, Australia
19:30 AEDT	van Egmond 44', 45+4', 70'; Simon 67', 73'; Raso 71'	Report		Stadium: Campbelltown Stadium; Referee: Yoshimi Yamashita (Japan)

13 February 2020 Third round	Australia	1–1	China	Sydney, Australia
19:30 AEDT	Van Egmond 90+2'	Report	Tang Jiali 86'	Stadium: Bankwest Stadium; Attendance: 5,660; Referee: Yoshimi Yamashita (Japan)

6 March 2020 Play-off round	Australia	5–0	Vietnam	Newcastle, Australia
18:30 AEDT	Kerr 10', 80' (pen.); Logarzo 27'; Van Egmond 38'; Polkinghorne 67'	Report		Stadium: McDonald Jones Stadium; Attendance: 14,014; Referee: Abirami Naidu (Singapore)

11 March 2020 Play-off round	Vietnam	1–2	Australia	Cẩm Phả, Vietnam
18:00 ICT	Huỳnh Như 55'	Report	Kerr 15'; Raso 27'	Stadium: Cẩm Phả Stadium; Referee: Thein Thein Aye (Myanmar)

=== Australia women's national under-20 soccer team ===
==== AFC U-19 Women's Championship ====
27 October 2019 Group stage	North Korea	5–1	Australia	Chonburi, Thailand
16:00 (UTC+7)	Kim Hyang 19'; Jun Yi Hwa 30'; Ri Kum Hyang 74'; Pak Il Gyong 83'; Kim Kyong Yong 88'	Report	Cooney-Cross 16'	Stadium: IPE Chonburi Stadium; Attendance: 170; Referee: Edita Mirabidova (Uzbekistan)

30 October 2019 Group stage	Thailand	1–3	Australia	Chonburi, Thailand
19:00 (UTC+7)	Pattaranan 63'	Report	M. Fowler 18', 42'; Nevin 56'	Stadium: Chonburi Stadium; Attendance: 280; Referee: Mahsa Ghorbani (Iran)

2 November 2019 Group stage	Australia	1–0	Vietnam	Chonburi, Thailand
16:00 (UTC+7)	M. Fowler 84'	Report		Stadium: IPE Chonburi Stadium; Attendance: 90; Referee: Oh Hyeon-jeong (South Korea)

6 November 2019 Semi-final	Japan	7–0	Australia	Chonburi, Thailand
20:00 (UTC+7)	Kanno 21' (pen.); Osawa 23', 48'; Yamamoto 50'; Ito 52'; Hirosawa 80', 86'	Report		Stadium: Chonburi Stadium; Attendance: 120; Referee: Ranjita Devi Tekcham (India)

9 November 2019 Third place match	South Korea	9–1	Australia	Chonburi, Thailand
16:00	Noh Jin-young 14'; Choo Hyo-joo 24', 88'; Kang Ji-woo 36', 75', 84' (pen.), 90'; Hyun Seul-gi 39'; Cho Mi-jin 90+2'	Report	Fowler 81'	Stadium: Chonburi Stadium

=== Australia women's national under-17 soccer team ===
==== Friendlies ====
The following is a list of friendlies played by the women's under 17 national team in 2019–20.

8 August 2019	Tonga	0–6	Australia	Nuku’alofa, Tonga
13:00 TOT		Report		Stadium: Tonga Football Academy

12 August 2019	Vanuatu	0–13	Australia	Port Vila, Vanuatu
15:00 VUT		Report		Stadium: Korman Stadium

15 August 2019	Solomon Islands	0–14	Australia	Honiara, Solomon Islands
16:00 SBT		Report		Stadium: Lawson Tama Stadium

==== AFC U-16 Women's Championship ====
15 September 2019 Group stage	Japan	0–0	Australia	Chonburi, Thailand
16:00 (ICT)		Report		Stadium: IPE Chonburi Stadium; Attendance: 223; Referee: Law Bik Chi (Hong Kong)

18 September 2019 Group stage	Thailand	1–6	Australia	Chonburi, Thailand
19:00 (ICT)	Janista 70'	Report	Jancevski 5', 45+1'; Lowry 27', 45+3'; Beaumont 51', 59'	Stadium: Chonburi Stadium; Attendance: 250; Referee: Bùi Thị Thu Trang (Vietnam)

21 September 2019 Group stage	Australia	2–2	Bangladesh	Chonburi, Thailand
16:00 (ICT)		Report		Stadium: IPE Chonburi Stadium

25 September 2019 Semi-final	Australia	0–3	North Korea	Chonburi, Thailand
12:00 (ICT)		Report	H.Y. Kim 14', 17'; P.I. Kim 90'	Stadium: IPE Chonburi Stadium

28 September 2019 Third place match	China	2–1	Australia	Chonburi, Thailand
16:00 (ICT)	Shi 78'; Zou 82'	Report	Lowry 1'	Stadium: Chonburi Stadium, Chonburi

== AFC competitions ==
=== AFC Champions League ===
==== Group stage ====
===== Group E =====
Pos	Team	Pld	W	D	L	GF	GA	GD	Pts	Qualification	BEI	MVC	SEO	CHI
1	(China) Beijing Guoan	6	5	1	0	12	4	+8	16	Advance to knockout stage	—	3–1	3–1	1–1
2	(Australia) Melbourne Victory	6	2	1	3	6	9	−3	7	Advance to knockout stage	0–2	—	2–1	1–0
3	(South Korea) FC Seoul	6	2	0	4	10	9	+1	6		1–2	1–0	—	5–0
4	(Thailand) Chiangrai United	6	1	2	3	5	11	−6	5		0–1	2–2	2–1	—

Source: AFC

===== Group F =====
Pos	Team	Pld	W	D	L	GF	GA	GD	Pts	Qualification	ULS	TOK	SSH	PRG
1	(South Korea) Ulsan Hyundai	6	5	1	0	14	5	+9	16	Advance to knockout stage	—	1–1	3–1	2–0
2	(Japan) FC Tokyo	6	3	1	2	6	5	+1	10	Advance to knockout stage	1–2	—	0–1	1–0
3	(China) Shanghai Shenhua	6	2	1	3	9	13	−4	7		1–4	1–2	—	3–3
4	(Australia) Perth Glory	6	0	1	5	5	11	−6	1		1–2	0–1	1–2	—

Source: AFC

===== Group H =====
Pos	Team	Pld	W	D	L	GF	GA	GD	Pts	Qualification	YOK	SSI	JEO	SYD
1	(Japan) Yokohama F. Marinos	6	4	1	1	13	5	+8	13	Advance to knockout stage	—	1–2	4–1	4–0
2	(China) Shanghai SIPG	6	3	0	3	6	10	−4	9	Advance to knockout stage	0–1	—	0–2	0–4
3	(South Korea) Jeonbuk Hyundai Motors	6	2	1	3	8	10	−2	7		1–2	1–2	—	1–0
4	(Australia) Sydney FC	6	1	2	3	8	10	−2	5		1–1	1–2	2–2	—

Source: AFC

==== Knockout stage ====
===== Round of 16 =====
Team 1	Score	Team 2
Ulsan Hyundai (South Korea)	3–0	(Australia) Melbourne Victory

== Men's football ==
=== A-League ===
Pos	Team	Pld	W	D	L	GF	GA	GD	Pts	Qualification
1	Sydney FC (C)	26	16	5	5	49	25	+24	53	Qualification for 2021 AFC Champions League group stage and Finals series (Note: All Australian teams withdrew from the 2021 AFC Champions League on 4 June 2021.) (Note: The top two teams enter the Finals series at the semi-finals, while the teams ranked third to sixth enter the Finals series at the elimination-finals.)
2	Melbourne City	26	14	5	7	49	37	+12	47	Qualification for 2021 AFC Champions League qualifying play-offs and Finals series
3	Wellington Phoenix (Note: Wellington Phoenix cannot qualify for the 2021 AFC Champions League as they are not recognised as an AFC club.)	26	12	5	9	38	33	+5	41	Qualification for Finals series
4	Brisbane Roar	26	11	7	8	29	28	+1	40	Qualification for 2021 AFC Champions League qualifying play-offs and Finals series
5	Western United	26	12	3	11	46	37	+9	39	Qualification for Finals series
6	Perth Glory	26	10	7	9	43	36	+7	37	Qualification for Finals series
7	Adelaide United	26	11	3	12	44	49	−5	36	
8	Newcastle Jets	26	9	7	10	32	40	−8	34	
9	Western Sydney Wanderers	26	9	6	11	35	40	−5	33	
10	Melbourne Victory	26	6	5	15	33	44	−11	23	
11	Central Coast Mariners	26	5	3	18	26	55	−29	18	

Source: A-Leagues
Rules for classification: 1) points; 2) goal difference; 3) number of goals scored.
(C) Champions

==== Finals series ====
Elimination-finals
Wellington Phoenix	0
Perth Glory	1
Brisbane Roar	0
Western United	1

Semi-finals
Sydney FC	2
Perth Glory	0
Melbourne City	2
Western United	0

Grand Final
Sydney FC	1
Melbourne City	0

==== Elimination-finals ====
22 August 2020	Wellington Phoenix	0–1	Perth Glory	Sydney
17:00 AEST		Report	Chianese 18'	Stadium: Bankwest Stadium; Attendance: 0 (played behind closed doors due to the COVID-19 pandemic in Australia); Referee: Alex King

23 August 2020	Brisbane Roar	0–1	Western United	Sydney
18:00 AEST		Report	Diamanti 21'	Stadium: Bankwest Stadium; Attendance: 0 (played behind closed doors due to the COVID-19 pandemic in Australia); Referee: Chris Beath

==== Semi-finals ====
26 August 2020	Melbourne City	2–0	Western United	Sydney
17:00 AEST	Maclaren 68' (pen.); Imai 84' (o.g.)	Report		Stadium: Bankwest Stadium; Attendance: 1,897; Referee: Alireza Faghani

26 August 2020	Sydney FC	2–0	Perth Glory	Sydney
20:10 AEST	Ninković 24'; Le Fondre 28'	Report		Stadium: Bankwest Stadium; Attendance: 3,477; Referee: Alex King

==== Grand final ====
30 August 2020
18:30 AEST

Sydney FC	1–0	Melbourne City
Grant 100'	Report

Bankwest Stadium, Sydney
Attendance: 7,051
Referee: Chris Beath

=== National Premier Leagues ===
The Final Series featured the winner of each Member Federation's league competition in the National Premier Leagues, where the overall winner was to qualify directly for the 2020 FFA Cup Round of 32. Since that competition was cancelled, Wollongong Wolves qualified directly for the 2021 FFA Cup Round of 32.

Quarter-finals
(New South Wales) Wollongong Wolves	5
(Australian Capital Territory) Canberra Olympic	1
(Victoria (state)) Heidelberg United	2
(Western Australia) Perth SC (a.e.t.)	3
(New South Wales) Maitland FC	3
(Tasmania) Devonport City	2
(Queensland) Lions FC	2
(South Australia) Campbelltown City	1

Semi-finals
(New South Wales) Wollongong Wolves	2
(Western Australia) Perth SC	0
(New South Wales) Maitland FC	0
(Queensland) Lions FC	2

Grand Final
(New South Wales) Wollongong Wolves (a.e.t.)	4
(Queensland) Lions FC	3

=== Cup competitions ===
==== FFA Cup ====
Round of 32
Adelaide Olympic	4
Floreat Athena	3
Tigers FC	0
Hume City	2
Sydney FC	0
Brisbane Roar	2
Maitland FC	0
Central Coast Mariners	2
Olympic FC	5
Bayswater City	2
Melbourne Knights	2
Adelaide United	5
Darwin Olympic	0
Edgeworth FC	3
Melbourne Victory	2
Newcastle Jets	3
Brisbane Strikers (p)	2 (4)
Wellington Phoenix	2 (2)
Mt Druitt Town Rangers	2 (2)
Manly United (p)	2 (4)
Bulleen Lions	1 (2)
Moreland Zebras (p)	1 (3)
Magpies Crusaders United	2
Coomera Colts	1
South Hobart	0
Marconi Stallions	3
Campbelltown City	1
Melbourne City	3
St George	3
Sydney United 58 (a.e.t.)	5
Perth Glory	1
Western Sydney Wanderers	2

Round of 16
Adelaide Olympic	1
Hume City	3
Brisbane Roar	2 (2)
Central Coast Mariners (p)	2 (4)
Olympic FC	2
Adelaide United	3
Edgeworth FC	1
Newcastle Jets	5
Brisbane Strikers	1
Manly United	0
Moreland Zebras	4
Magpies Crusaders United	0
Marconi Stallions	1
Melbourne City	2
Sydney United 58	1
Western Sydney Wanderers	7

Quarter-finals
Hume City	0
Central Coast Mariners	1
Adelaide United	1
Newcastle Jets	0
Brisbane Strikers	3
Moreland Zebras	2
Melbourne City	3
Western Sydney Wanderers	0

Semi-finals
Central Coast Mariners	1
Adelaide United	2
Brisbane Strikers	1
Melbourne City	5

Final
Adelaide United	4
Melbourne City	0

===== Final =====
23 October 2019
19:00 ACDT

Adelaide United	4–0	Melbourne City
Toure 25'; Halloran 49'; Mileusnic 60'; McGree 75'	Report

Coopers Stadium, Adelaide
Attendance: 14,920
Referee: Alex King

== Women's football ==
=== W-League ===
Pos	Team	Pld	W	D	L	GF	GA	GD	Pts	Qualification
1	Melbourne City (C)	12	11	1	0	27	4	+23	34	Qualification to Finals series
2	Melbourne Victory	12	7	2	3	24	14	+10	23	Qualification to Finals series
3	Sydney FC	12	7	1	4	21	13	+8	22	Qualification to Finals series
4	Western Sydney Wanderers	12	7	1	4	24	20	+4	22	Qualification to Finals series
5	Brisbane Roar	12	5	2	5	22	19	+3	17	
6	Canberra United	12	4	1	7	13	29	−16	13	
7	Perth Glory	12	3	2	7	19	24	−5	11	
8	Adelaide United	12	2	1	9	12	24	−12	7	
9	Newcastle Jets	12	2	1	9	12	27	−15	7	

Source: A-Leagues
Rules for classification: 1) points; 2) goal difference; 3) number of goals scored.
(C) Champions

==== Finals series ====
Semi-finals
1	Melbourne City	5
4	Western Sydney Wanderers	1
2	Melbourne Victory	0
3	Sydney FC	1

Grand Final
Melbourne City	1
Sydney FC	0

== Deaths ==
- 14 September 2019: Rudi Gutendorf, 93, Australian head coach from 1979 to 1981.
- 28 November 2019: Pim Verbeek, 63, Australian head coach from 2007 to 2010.
- 27 May 2020: Liesbeth Migchelsen, 49, Canberra United head coach from 2013 to 2014.

== Retirements ==
- 2 July 2019: Marc Janko, 36, former Austria and Sydney FC striker.
- 15 July 2019: Lizzie Durack, 25, former England and Western Sydney Wanderers goalkeeper.
- 15 September 2019: Daniel McBreen, 42, former Newcastle United, North Queensland Fury, Perth Glory and Central Coast Mariners striker.
- 10 October 2019: Caitlin Munoz, 36, former Australia and Canberra United striker.
- 18 October 2019: Ken Ilsø, 33, former Adelaide United striker.
- 1 January 2020: David Villa, 38, former Spain and Melbourne City striker.
- 6 January 2020: Erika Tymrak, 28, former United States and Melbourne City midfielder.
- 28 January 2020: Alexander Meier, 37, former Western Sydney Wanderers forward.
- 6 May 2020: Jakob Poulsen, 36, former Denmark and Melbourne Victory midfielder.
- 14 May 2020: Marcos Flores, 34, former Adelaide United, Melbourne Victory, Central Coast Mariners, Newcastle Jets and Adelaide City midfielder.
- 26 May 2020: Alex Cisak, 31, former Sydney FC goalkeeper.
- 18 June 2020: Glen Moss, 37, former New Zealand, Sydney Olympic, New Zealand Knights, Wellington Phoenix, Melbourne Victory, Gold Coast United, and Newcastle Jets goalkeeper.
