= Shimokawa =

Shimokawa may refer to:

== People with the surname ==
Shimokawa (下川) is a Japanese surname.

- Gary Shimokawa (born 1942), American director and producer
- Haruki Shimokawa (下川 陽輝, born 2003), Japanese footballer
- Kanji Shimokawa (下川 甲嗣, born 1999), Japanese rugby union player
- Kenichi Shimokawa (下川 健一, born 1970), Japanese former footballer
- Mikuni Shimokawa (下川 みくに, born 1980), Japanese singer-songwriter
- Ōten Shimokawa (下川 凹天, 1892–1973), Japanese artist, one of the founding artists and pioneers of anime
- Seigo Shimokawa (下川 誠吾, born 1975), Japanese former footballer
- Tadashi Shimokawa (下川 禎, born 1962), Japanese fencer
- Taiyo Shimokawa (下川 太陽, born 2002), Japanese footballer
- Tappei Shimokawa (下川 辰平, 1928–2004), Japanese actor
- Yota Shimokawa (下川 陽太, born 1995), Japanese footballer

== Places ==
- Shimokawa, Hokkaido, a town in Kamikawa Subprefecture, Hokkaido Prefecture, Japan
