= Yudha Febrian =

Indonesian footballer

Personal information
- Full name: Mochamad Yudha Febrian
- Date of birth: 13 February 2002 (age 24)
- Place of birth: Bogor, Indonesia
- Height: 1.75 m (5 ft 9 in)
- Position: Left-back

Team information
- Current team: Persipa Pati
- Number: 3

Youth career
- 2008–2018: SSB Cibinong Putra
- 2018–2020: Barito Putera
- 2019: Garuda Select

Senior career*
Years	Team	Apps	(Gls)
2020–2021	Barito Putera	0	(0)
2021	PSG Pati	0	(0)
2021	Persik Kediri	1	(0)
2022	Persikab Bandung	0	(0)
2022	PSGC Ciamis	3	(0)
2023	Persikabo 1973	3	(0)
2023–2024	PSDS Deli Serdang	8	(1)
2024–2025	Persikota Tangerang	18	(1)
2025	PSPS Pekanbaru	0	(0)
2025–	Persipa Pati	7	(0)

International career
2017–2018	Indonesia U16	15	(0)
2019–2020	Indonesia U19	7	(0)
Medal record
Men's football
Representing Indonesia
AFF U-16 Youth Championship
Winner	2018 Indonesia
AFF U-19 Youth Championship
Third place	2019 Vietnam
- * Club domestic league appearances and goals as of 11 January 2026

Mochamad Yudha Febrian (born 13 February 2002) is an Indonesian footballer who plays as a left-back for Liga Nusantara club Persipa Pati.

== Club career ==
=== Persik Kediri ===
He was signed for Persik Kediri to play in Liga 1 in the 2021 season. Yudha made his professional debut on 15 October 2021 in a match against PSIS Semarang at the Manahan Stadium, Surakarta.

=== Persikab Bandung ===
On 20 June 2022, it was announced that Yudha would be joining Persikab Bandung for the 2022-23 Liga 2 campaign.

== Career statistics ==
=== Club ===
As of 11 January 2026.

Club	Season	League			Cup		Other		Total	
Club	Season	Division	Apps	Goals	Apps	Goals	Apps	Goals	Apps	Goals
Barito Putera	2021	Liga 1	0	0	0	0	0	0	0	0
PSG Pati	2021	Liga 2	0	0	0	0	0	0	0	0
Persik Kediri	2021	Liga 1	1	0	0	0	0	0	1	0
Persikab Bandung	2022–23	Liga 2	0	0	0	0	0	0	0	0
PSGC Ciamis	2022–23	Liga 3	3	0	0	0	0	0	3	0
Persikabo 1973	2023–24	Liga 1	3	0	0	0	0	0	3	0
PSDS Deli Serdang	2023–24	Liga 2	8	1	0	0	0	0	8	1
Persikota Tangerang	2024–25	Liga 2	18	1	0	0	0	0	18	1
PSPS Pekanbaru	2025–26	Championship	0	0	0	0	0	0	0	0
Persipa Pati	2025–26	Liga Nusantara	7	0	0	0	0	0	7	0
Career total			40	2	0	0	0	0	40	2

== Honours ==
=== International ===
Indonesia U-16

- JENESYS Japan-ASEAN U-16 Youth Football Tournament: 2017
- AFF U-16 Youth Championship: 2018

Indonesia U-19

- AFF U-19 Youth Championship third place: 2019
