= Mouzinho (footballer) =

East Timorese footballer

Personal information
- Full name: Mouzinho Barreto de Lima
- Date of birth: 26 June 2002 (age 24)
- Place of birth: Maliana, Timor-Leste
- Height: 1.72 m (5 ft 8 in)
- Position: Forward

Team information
- Current team: Sport Laulara e Benfica

Senior career*
Years	Team	Apps	(Gls)
2017–2019	SLB Laulara		
2020–2021	Boavista TL		
2021–2022	SLB Laulara		
2022	Angkor Tiger	12	(2)
2023–2024	Visakha	21	(2)
2023	→ SLB Laulara (loan)		
2025	Igalo	1	(0)
2025	Aguilas–UMak	4	(0)

International career^{‡}
2018–2019	Timor-Leste U19	5	(6)
2019–	Timor-Leste U23	11	(3)
2019–	Timor-Leste	17	(3)
- * Club domestic league appearances and goals as of 8 November 2025 ‡ National team caps and goals as of 31 March 2026

Mouzinho Barreto de Lima (born 26 June 2002) is an East Timorese professional footballer who plays as a forward for the Timor-Leste national team.

He was one of the top scorers of the 2019 AFF U-18 Youth Championship with 6 goals, alongside Australia's Dylan Ruiz-Diaz and Indonesia's Bagus Kahfi.

== Career ==
Born in Maliana, Mouzinho is the youngest of six siblings, a devout Catholic and very close to his family. Inspired by Cristiano Ronaldo Mouzinho aimed to emulate the Portuguese icon and set out to become the best player in Asia.

In 2020, Mouzinho was the top scorer of the Copa FFTL, scoring 14 goals in 7 matches.

Mouzinho was first scouted by Angkor Tiger Head Coach Alistair Heath after coming across the forward’s exploits during the 2022 AFF U-23 Championship and the 2021 SEA Games. Not long after, the Timorese forward then signed for the Cambodian Premier League outfit on June 1, 2022, and introduced himself to the Cambodian football fraternity by scoring for Timor-Leste against the Cambodia national football team in a friendly game one day later. The strike marked Mouzinho’s first goal for his national team but his side would eventually suffer a 2–1 defeat.

Mouzinho made his debut for the Cambodian Tigers on July 2 in a 3–3 draw against Kirivong Sok Sen Chey and would come off the bench against Phnom Penh Crown in the subsequent game. Mouzinho’s efforts were rewarded at the start of Round 3 when he bagged a brace in a match against Visakha. The following match against Kirivong, Mouzinho made his first assist to Iago Bento.

In 2023 Mouzinho moved to Cambodian team Visakha. During this period he played 21 matches for the Cambodian side, alongside completing a loan move to his former club SLB Benfica.

In 2025 Mouzinho completed a move to Montenegrin second league Igalo. He would make 1 appearance for the club, playing 62 minutes in an 8-0 win against Kom Podgorica on May 25th.

== Career statistics ==
=== International ===
As of matches played 31 March 2026

National team	Year	Apps	Goals
Timor-Leste	2019	1	0
Timor-Leste	2020	0	0
Timor-Leste	2021	4	0
Timor-Leste	2022	6	3
Timor-Leste	2023	0	0
Timor-Leste	2024	1	0
Timor-Leste	2025	4	0
Timor-Leste	2026	1	0
Total		17	3

No	Date	Venue	Opponent	Score	Result	Competition
1.	28 May 2022	Morodok Techo National Stadium, Phnom Penh, Cambodia	Cambodia	1–0	1–2	Friendly
2.	5 November 2022	Track & Field Sports Complex, Bandar Seri Begawan, Brunei	Brunei	1–2	2–6	2022 AFF Championship qualification
3.	8 November 2022	Track & Field Sports Complex, Bandar Seri Begawan, Brunei	Brunei	1–0	1–0	2022 AFF Championship qualification

== Honours ==
=== Individual ===
- AFF U-19 Youth Championship Top scorer: 2019
- AFF U-23 Championship Team of the Tournament: 2022
