= Chatmongkol =

Chatmongkol is a given name. Notable people with the given name include:

- Chatmongkol Rueangthanarot (born 2002), Thai footballer
- Chatmongkol Thongkiri (born 1997), Thai footballer
