= Brylian Aldama =

Indonesian footballer (born 2002)

Personal information
- Full name: Brylian Negietha Dwiki Aldama
- Date of birth: 23 February 2002 (age 24)
- Place of birth: Surabaya, Indonesia
- Height: 1.75 m (5 ft 9 in)
- Position: Midfielder

Youth career
- 2017–2018: Chelsea Soccer School
- 2018–2019: Persebaya Surabaya
- 2019–2020: Garuda Select
- 2021–2022: Rijeka
- 2021: → Pomorac 1921 (loan)

Senior career*
Years	Team	Apps	(Gls)
2022–2024	Persebaya Surabaya	16	(1)
2023–2024	→ PSCS Cilacap (loan)	10	(1)
2024	Young Elephants	7	(1)
2025	Persis Solo	0	(0)
2025	→ Persela Lamongan (loan)	1	(0)

International career
2017–2018	Indonesia U16	18	(2)
2019–2020	Indonesia U19	7	(1)
Medal record
Men's football
Representing Indonesia
AFF U-16 Youth Championship
Winner	2018 Indonesia
AFF U-19 Youth Championship
Third place	2019 Vietnam
- * Club domestic league appearances and goals as of 27 January 2025

Brylian Negietha Dwiki Aldama (born 23 February 2002) is an Indonesian professional footballer who plays as a midfielder.

== Youth career ==
Brylian Aldama launched his footballing career in his hometown of Surabaya through the youth system of Persebaya. After playing for several Indonesian national junior teams in different age groups from 2018 to 2020, he attracted top-flight Croatian club HNK Rijeka that recruited him to play for their youth team in the first half of 2021. After a few non-league matches, he failed to earn a spot on the roster, leading to a loan spell at NK Pomorac 1921, which plays in the third-tier of Croatian football. He played several matches for Pomorac's junior team and even scored goals for them but injuries blocked his progression.

== Club career ==
=== Persebaya Surabaya ===
In 2022, Aldama moved back to Indonesia and signed for the senior team of his childhood club Persebaya Surabaya on 29 April 2022 to play in Liga 1 in the 2022–23 season. He made his league debut on 25 July 2022 in a match against Persikabo 1973 at the Pakansari Stadium, Cibinong.

He scored his first league goal for the club on 29 March 2023, scored the winning goal in a 2–1 against PSIS Semarang.

== International career ==
Aldama was part of the Indonesia U-16 team that won the 2018 AFF U-16 Youth Championship and the Indonesia U-19 team that finished third in 2019 AFF U-19 Youth Championship. In August 2020, Aldama was included on Indonesia national under-19 football team 30-man list for Training Center in Croatia.

== Career statistics ==
=== Club ===
As of 27 January 2025

Club	Season	League			Cup		Continental		Other		Total	
Club	Season	Division	Apps	Goals	Apps	Goals	Apps	Goals	Apps	Goals	Apps	Goals
Persebaya Surabaya	2022–23	Liga 1	15	1	0	0	–		3 (Note: Appearances in Indonesia President's Cup)	0	18	1
Persebaya Surabaya	2023–24	Liga 1	1	0	0	0	–		0	0	1	0
PSCS Cilacap (loan)	2023–24	Liga 2	10	1	0	0	–		0	0	10	1
Young Elephants	2024–25	Lao League	7	1	0	0	2 (Note: Appearances in AFC Challenge League)	2	0	0	9	3
Persis Solo	2024–25	Liga 1	0	0	0	0	–		0	0	0	0
Persela Lamongan (loan)	2024–25	Liga 2	1	0	0	0	–		0	0	1	0
Career total			34	3	0	0	2	2	3	0	39	5

== Honours ==
=== Club ===
Persebaya Surabaya U20

- Elite Pro Academy U-20: 2019

=== International ===
Indonesia U16

- JENESYS Japan-ASEAN U-16 Youth Football Tournament: 2017
- AFF U-16 Youth Championship: 2018

Indonesia U19

- AFF U-19 Youth Championship third place: 2019
