= Salman Alfarid =

Indonesian footballer

Personal information
- Full name: Muhammad Salman Alfarid
- Date of birth: 16 April 2002 (age 24)
- Place of birth: Jakarta, Indonesia
- Height: 1.74 m (5 ft 9 in)
- Positions: Left-back; centre-back

Team information
- Current team: PSS Sleman
- Number: 16

Youth career
- 2016–2018: SKO Ragunan
- 2019: Garuda Select
- 2019–2020: Persija Jakarta

Senior career*
Years	Team	Apps	(Gls)
2021–2022	Persija Jakarta	1	(0)
2022–2024	Persebaya Surabaya	4	(0)
2023–2024	→ Gresik United (loan)	0	(0)
2024–2025	PSBS Biak	16	(0)
2025–	PSS Sleman	16	(0)

International career^{‡}
2017–2018	Indonesia U16	7	(0)
2019–2020	Indonesia U19	5	(1)
2023	Indonesia U23	1	(0)
Medal record
Men's football
Representing Indonesia
AFF U-16 Youth Championship
Winner	2018 Indonesia
AFF U-19 Youth Championship
Third place	2019 Vietnam
- * Club domestic league appearances and goals as of 9 May 2026 ‡ National team caps and goals as of 16 April 2023

Muhammad Salman Alfarid (born 16 April 2002) is an Indonesian professional footballer who plays as a left-back or a centre-back for Liga 2 club PSS Sleman.

== Club career ==
=== Persija Jakarta ===
He was signed for Persija Jakarta to play in Liga 1 in the 2020 season. Alfarid made his first-team debut on 19 September 2021 in a match against Persipura Jayapura at the Indomilk Arena, Tangerang.

=== Persebaya Surabaya ===
April 2022, he joined Persebaya Surabaya with undisclosed fee. Salman made his professional debut on 16 December 2022 in a match against Persija Jakarta at the Maguwoharjo Stadium, Sleman.

== International career ==
Alfarid was part of the Indonesia U-16 team that won the 2018 AFF U-16 Youth Championship and the Indonesia U-19 team that finished third in 2019 AFF U-19 Youth Championship. In November 2019, Alfarid was named as Indonesia U-20 All Stars squad, to play in U-20 International Cup held in Bali.

== Honours ==
=== International ===
Indonesia U-16

- JENESYS Japan-ASEAN U-16 Youth Football Tournament: 2017
- AFF U-16 Youth Championship: 2018

Indonesia U-19

- AFF U-19 Youth Championship third place: 2019

=== Club ===
Persija Jakarta

- Menpora Cup: 2021

PSS Sleman

- Championship runner up: 2025–26
