= Theo Numberi =

Indonesian footballer

Personal information
- Full name: Theo Fillo Bartolomei Dacosta Numberi
- Date of birth: 1 September 2001 (age 25)
- Place of birth: Jayapura, Indonesia
- Height: 1.64 m (5 ft 5 in)
- Position: Defensive midfielder

Team information
- Current team: Garudayaksa
- Number: 6

Youth career
- 2016: PPLP Papua
- 2017: SKO Ragunan
- 2018: Persipura Jayapura

Senior career*
Years	Team	Apps	(Gls)
2019–2022	Persipura Jayapura	17	(0)
2022–2026	Dewa United	87	(0)
2026–	Garudayaksa	1	(0)

International career^{‡}
2019	Indonesia U19	2	(0)
Medal record
Men's football
Representing Indonesia
AFF U-19 Youth Championship
Third place	2019 Vietnam
- * Club domestic league appearances and goals as of 6 September 2026 ‡ National team caps and goals as of 19 August 2019

Theo Fillo Bartolomei Dacosta Numberi (born 1 September 2001) is an Indonesian professional footballer who plays as a defensive midfielder for Super League club Garudayaksa.

== Club career ==
=== Persipura Jayapura ===
He was signed for Persipura Jayapura to play in Liga 1 in the 2019 season. Numberi made his first-team debut on 18 November 2019 as a substitute in a match against PSM Makassar at the Andi Mattalatta Stadium, Makassar.

=== Dewa United ===
Numberi was signed for Dewa United to play in Liga 1 in the 2022–23 season. He made his league debut on 25 July 2022 in a match against Persis Solo at the Moch. Soebroto Stadium, Magelang.

== Career statistics ==
=== Club ===
As of 6 September 2026

Club	Season	League			Cup		Other		Total	
Club	Season	Division	Apps	Goals	Apps	Goals	Apps	Goals	Apps	Goals
Persipura Jayapura	2019	Liga 1	1	0	0	0	0	0	1	0
Persipura Jayapura	2020	Liga 1	0	0	0	0	0	0	0	0
Persipura Jayapura	2021–22	Liga 1	16	0	0	0	0	0	16	0
Persipura Jayapura	Total		17	0	0	0	0	0	17	0
Dewa United	2022–23	Liga 1	30	0	0	0	4 (Note: Appearances in Indonesia President's Cup)	0	34	0
Dewa United	2023–24	Liga 1	29	0	0	0	0	0	29	0
Dewa United	2024–25	Liga 1	13	0	0	0	0	0	13	0
Dewa United	2025–26	Super League	15	0	0	0	1 (Note: Appearances in AFC Challenge League)	0	16	0
Dewa United	Total		87	0	0	0	5	0	92	0
Garudayaksa	2026–27	Super League	1	0	0	0	0	0	1	0
Career total			105	0	0	0	4	0	109	0

== Honours ==
=== International ===
Indonesia U-19

- AFF U-19 Youth Championship third place: 2019
