= Komang Teguh =

Indonesian footballer (born 2002)

Personal information
- Full name: Komang Teguh Trisnanda Putra
- Date of birth: 28 April 2002 (age 24)
- Place of birth: Bangli, Indonesia
- Height: 1.77 m (5 ft 10 in)
- Positions: Centre-back; defensive midfielder

Team information
- Current team: Borneo Samarinda
- Number: 16

Youth career
- 2011: SSB Bali Bintang Centre
- 2012: SSB Guntur
- 2012–2016: SSB Putra Tresna Denpasar
- 2017–2020: SKO Ragunan
- 2019: Garuda Select

Senior career*
Years	Team	Apps	(Gls)
2020–	Borneo Samarinda	67	(5)

International career^{‡}
2018	Indonesia U16	10	(1)
2019–2020	Indonesia U19	7	(0)
2021–2024	Indonesia U23	21	(4)
Medal record
Men's football
Representing Indonesia
AFF U-16 Youth Championship
Winner	2018 Indonesia
AFF U-19 Youth Championship
Third place	2019 Vietnam
Southeast Asian Games
Gold medal – first place	2023 Cambodia	Team
- * Club domestic league appearances and goals as of 23 May 2026 ‡ National team caps and goals as of 9 May 2024

Komang Teguh Trisnanda Putra (born 28 April 2002) is an Indonesian professional footballer who plays as a defensive midfielder or a centre-back for Super League club Borneo Samarinda.

== Club career ==
=== Borneo Samarinda ===
On 22 October 2020, Komang signed a his first professional contract with Borneo Samarinda to play in 2020 Liga 1 season. Komang made his professional debut on 2 October 2021 in a match against Persita Tangerang at the Pakansari Stadium in Cibinong. In a match against Bali United on 29 January 2022, he played the full 90 minutes for the first time in a 2–1 lost in gameweek 21.

On 6 February 2024, Komang scored his first goal for Borneo Samarinda against Persija Jakarta in a 3–1 win.

== International career ==
Komang debuted in an Indonesia U16 when he was starting against Philippines U16 in the 2018 AFF U-16 Youth Championship and scoring his first U16 international goal in an 8–0 win against The Azkals.

In August 2019, Komang was called up to the Indonesia U-19 for the 2019 AFF U-18 Youth Championship by Fakhri Husaini and brought the U19 team to third place in the championship.

In October 2021, Komang was called up to the Indonesia U23 in a friendly match against Tajikistan and Nepal and also prepared for 2022 AFC U-23 Asian Cup qualification in Tajikistan by Shin Tae-yong.

In April 2024, Komang was named in the final squad for the 2024 AFC U-23 Asian Cup held in Qatar. On 18 April 2024, Komang scored Indonesia first-ever U23's goal at the AFC U-23 Asian Cup scoring match winning goal against Australia U23 which make history as the nation recorded their first ever win in the history of the AFC U23 Asian Cup. Few days later against Jordan U23, Komang scored a goal again in a 4–1 win.

== Career statistics ==
=== Club ===
As of match played 23 May 2026

Club	Season	League			Cup		Continental		Other		Total	
Club	Season	Division	Apps	Goals	Apps	Goals	Apps	Goals	Apps	Goals	Apps	Goals
Borneo Samarinda	2021–22	Liga 1	7	0	0	0	–		2 (Note: Appearances in Menpora Cup.)	0	9	0
Borneo Samarinda	2022–23	Liga 1	1	0	0	0	–		0	0	1	0
Borneo Samarinda	2023–24	Liga 1	12	1	0	0	–		0	0	12	1
Borneo Samarinda	2024–25	Liga 1	15	0	0	0	–		4 (Note: Appearances in ASEAN Club Championship)	0	19	0
Borneo Samarinda	2025–26	Super League	32	4	0	0	–		0	0	26	3
Career total			67	5	0	0	0	0	6	0	73	5

=== International goals ===
International under-23 goals

Goal	Date	Venue	Opponent	Score	Result	Competition
1.	13 May 2023	Olympic Stadium, Phnom Penh, Cambodia	Vietnam	1–0	3–2	2023 Southeast Asian Games
2.	5 April 2024	The Sevens Stadium, Dubai, United Arab Emirates	Saudi Arabia	1–1	1–3	Friendly
3.	18 April 2024	Abdullah bin Khalifa Stadium, Doha, Qatar	Australia	1–0	1–0	2024 AFC U-23 Asian Cup
4.	21 April 2024	Abdullah bin Khalifa Stadium, Doha, Qatar	Jordan	4–1	4–1	2024 AFC U-23 Asian Cup

== Honours ==
Borneo Samarinda

- Piala Presiden runner-up: 2024

Indonesia U-16

- JENESYS Japan-ASEAN U-16 Youth Football Tournament: 2017
- AFF U-16 Youth Championship: 2018

Indonesia U-19

- AFF U-19 Youth Championship third place: 2019

Indonesia U-23

- SEA Games gold medal: 2023
- AFC U-23 Asian Cup fourth-place: 2024

Individual

- APPI Indonesian Football Award Best XI: 2025–26
