= Hanon Nishio =

Japanese footballer (born 2003)

Hanan Nishio 西尾 葉音
Personal information
- Date of birth: April 27, 2003 (age 23)
- Place of birth: Saitama, Saitama, Japan
- Height: 1.70 m (5 ft 7 in)
- Position: Forward

Team information
- Current team: RB Omiya Ardija
- Number: 9

Youth career
- Miyahara Soccer Girls
- 2019–2021: Urawa Red Diamonds

Senior career*
Years	Team	Apps	(Gls)
2022–2026	Urawa Red Diamonds	20	(0)
2025–2026	→ RB Omiya Ardija	32	(6)
2026–	RB Omiya Ardija	0	(0)

International career^{‡}
2019	Japan U17	4	(3)
2026–	Japan	4	(2)
Medal record
Representing Japan
Asian Games
Gold medal – first place	2026 Aichi–Nagoya
AFC U-17 Women's Asian Cup
Winner	2019 Thailand
- * Club domestic league appearances and goals as of 1 June 2026 (UTC) ‡ National team caps and goals as of 2 October 2026 (UTC)

Hanon Nishio (西尾 葉音, Nishio Hanon; born April 27, 2003) is a Japanese professional footballer who plays as a forward for RB Omiya Ardija in the WE League and the Japan national team.

== Club career ==
Nishio was promoted to the first team of the Urawa Red Diamonds at the end of January 2022.

On January 6, 2025, Urawa Reds announced that Nishio would be RB Omiya Ardija until May 31, 2025. She began to produce results after her transfer, and her accurate long-range shots after speedy dribbling became known as the "Hanon Cannon" by fans and social media. On May 30, 2025, her loan spell was extended until June 30, 2026.

On May 21, 2026, Omiya announced that Nishio would be transferred to them on a permanent basis.

== International career ==
In 2019, Nishio was part of the Japan squad that won the AFC U-16 Women's Championship, in which she was named the tournament's MVP.

On July 27, 2026, Nishio was called up to the Japan national team to compete at the 2026 Asian Games. On September 17, she scored her first senior goal in an 8–0 victory over Vietnam. She then played a role in Japan's victory in the gold medal match, in which she scored a late equalizer and contributed to the penalty shootout.

== International goals ==
No.	Date	Venue	Opponent	Score	Result	Competition
1.	17 September 2026	Shizuoka Stadium, Fukuroi, Japan	Vietnam	6–0	8–0	2026 Asian Games
2.	2 October 2026	Shizuoka Stadium, Fukuroi, Japan	North Korea	2–2	2–2 (a.e.t.) (5–3 p)	2026 Asian Games

== Honours ==
Urawa Red Diamonds

- WE League: 2022–23, 2023–24
- WE League Cup: 2022–23
- Empress's Cup: 2024

Japan U16

- AFC U-16 Women's Championship: 2019

Japan

- Asian Games: 2026

Individual

- AFC U-16 Women's Championship Most Valuable Player: 2019
- WE League Outstanding Players Award: 2025–26
