= Mochammad Supriadi =

Indonesian footballer (born 2002)

Personal information
- Full name: Mochammad Supriadi
- Date of birth: 23 May 2002 (age 24)
- Place of birth: Surabaya, Indonesia
- Height: 1.64 m (5 ft 5 in)
- Position: Winger

Team information
- Current team: De Red
- Number: 54

Youth career
- 2015–2017: SSB Rungkut FC
- 2017–2018: SKO Ragunan
- 2018–2019: Persebaya Surabaya

Senior career*
Years	Team	Apps	(Gls)
2019–2023	Persebaya Surabaya	37	(1)
2023–2026	Persik Kediri	55	(2)
2026–	De Red	1	(0)

International career^{‡}
2017–2018	Indonesia U16	12	(7)
2019–2020	Indonesia U19	7	(5)
Medal record
Men's football
Representing Indonesia
AFF U-16 Youth Championship
Winner	2018 Indonesia
AFF U-19 Youth Championship
Third place	2019 Vietnam
- * Club domestic league appearances and goals as of 12 September 2026 ‡ National team caps and goals as of 8 November 2019

Mochammad Supriadi (born 23 May 2002) is an Indonesian professional footballer who plays as a winger for Championship club De Red.

== Club career ==
=== Persebaya Surabaya ===
On 21 May 2019, Persebaya Surabaya announced a deal for Supriadi to join Indonesian Liga 1 club Persebaya on a free transfer. At that time, he was 16 years old and he has officially signed a long-term contract. Supriadi made his first-team debut on 24 August 2019 as a substitute in a match against Persija Jakarta. He entered 2 minutes before half time.

=== Persik Kediri ===
Supriadi was signed for Persik Kediri to play in Liga 1 in the 2023–24 season. He made his debut on 3 July 2023 in a match against Borneo Samarinda at the Brawijaya Stadium, Kediri.

== International career ==
Supriadi was part of the Indonesia U-16 team that won the 2018 AFF U-16 Youth Championship and the Indonesia U-19 team that finished third in 2019 AFF U-19 Youth Championship. In August 2020, Supriadi was included on Indonesia national under-19 football team 30-man list for Training Center in Croatia.

== Career statistics ==
=== Club ===
As of 12 September 2026

Club	Season	League			Cup		Other		Total	
Club	Season	Division	Apps	Goals	Apps	Goals	Apps	Goals	Apps	Goals
Persebaya Surabaya	2019	Liga 1	2	0	0	0	0	0	2	0
Persebaya Surabaya	2020	Liga 1	0	0	0	0	0	0	0	0
Persebaya Surabaya	2021–22	Liga 1	14	0	0	0	5 (Note: Appearances in Menpora Cup.)	0	19	0
Persebaya Surabaya	2022–23	Liga 1	21	1	0	0	2 (Note: Appearances in Indonesia President's Cup)	0	23	1
Persebaya Surabaya	Total		37	1	0	0	7	0	44	1
Persik Kediri	2023–24	Liga 1	29	0	0	0	0	0	29	0
Persik Kediri	2024–25	Liga 1	6	1	0	0	0	0	6	1
Persik Kediri	2025–26	Super League	20	1	0	0	0	0	20	1
de Red	2026–27	Championship	1	0	0	0	0	0	1	0
Career total			93	3	0	0	7	0	100	3

== International goals ==
=== Indonesia U19 ===
No.	Date	Venue	Opponent	Score	Result	Competition
1.	6 August 2019	Dĩ An Football Field, Dĩ An, Vietnam	Philippines	6–1	7–1	2019 AFF U-18 Youth Championship
2.	6 August 2019	Dĩ An Football Field, Dĩ An, Vietnam	Philippines	7–1	7–1	2019 AFF U-18 Youth Championship
3.	19 August 2019	Thống Nhất Stadium, Hồ Chí Minh City, Vietnam	Myanmar	2–0	5–0	2019 AFF U-18 Youth Championship
4.	19 August 2019	Thống Nhất Stadium, Hồ Chí Minh City, Vietnam	Myanmar	3–0	5–0	2019 AFF U-18 Youth Championship
5.	19 August 2019	Thống Nhất Stadium, Hồ Chí Minh City, Vietnam	Myanmar	5–0	5–0	2019 AFF U-18 Youth Championship

== Honours ==
Persebaya Surabaya

- Liga 1 runner-up: 2019
- East Java Governor Cup: 2020

Persebaya Surabaya U-20

- Elite Pro Academy U-20: 2019

Indonesia U-16

- Thien Phong Plastic Cup: 2017
- JENESYS Japan-ASEAN U-16 Youth Football Tournament: 2017
- AFF U-16 Youth Championship: 2018

Indonesia U-19

- AFF U-19 Youth Championship third place: 2019
