= Wut Tola =

Cambodian footballer

Personal information
- Full name: Wut Tola
- Date of birth: 6 October 2002 (age 24)
- Place of birth: Battambang, Cambodia
- Height: 1.66 m (5 ft 5 in)
- Position: Forward

Youth career
- 2018–2020: Visakha

Senior career*
Years	Team	Apps	(Gls)
2020–2021	Prey Veng	2	(1)
2021–2022	Visakha	11	(3)
2023	Ministry of Interior FA	5	(2)
2025–2026	Phnom Penh Crown	8	(0)

International career^{‡}
2019	Cambodia U19	8	(2)
2021	Cambodia	2	(0)
- * Club domestic league appearances and goals as of 20:12, 23 March 2026 (UTC) ‡ National team caps and goals as of 20:12, 4 June 2021 (UTC)

Wut Tola (born 6 October 2002) is a Cambodian footballer who plays as a forward for the Cambodian Premier League club Phnom Penh Crown.

== Club career ==
=== Phnom Penh Crown ===
On 8 July 2025, Tola signed for Phnom Penh Crown.

== Career statistics ==
=== International ===
As of match played 4 June 2021

National team	Year	Apps	Goals
Cambodia	2021	2	0
Total		1	0
