= Sutan Zico =

Indonesian footballer

Personal information
- Full name: Sutan Diego Armando Ondriano Zico
- Date of birth: 7 April 2002 (age 24)
- Place of birth: Jakarta, Indonesia
- Height: 1.72 m (5 ft 8 in)
- Position: Forward

Team information
- Current team: Donggala United
- Number: 9

Youth career
- 2014–2016: ASAD 313 Jaya Perkasa
- 2016: SSB Taruna
- 2017–2018: Chelsea Soccer School
- 2018–2021: Persija Jakarta
- 2019: Garuda Select

Senior career*
Years	Team	Apps	(Gls)
2020	Persija Jakarta	0	(0)
2021–2022	PSG Pati	6	(0)
2022–2024	Persik Kediri	1	(0)
2023–2024	→ Persipa Pati (loan)	7	(0)
2024–2025	Persiku Kudus	3	(0)
2025–2026	Sriwijaya	15	(3)
2026	Persiraja Banda Aceh	8	(0)
2026–	Donggala United	2	(2)

International career^{‡}
2017–2018	Indonesia U16	15	(14)
2019	Indonesia U19	8	(2)
Medal record
Men's football
Representing Indonesia
AFF U-16 Youth Championship
Winner	2018 Indonesia
AFF U-19 Youth Championship
Third place	2019 Vietnam
- * Club domestic league appearances and goals as of 18 November 2026 ‡ National team caps and goals as of 19 August 2019

Sutan Diego Armando Ondriano Zico (born 7 April 2002) is an Indonesian professional footballer who plays as a forward for Liga Nusantara club Donggala United.

== Club career ==
=== PSG Pati ===
On 22 June 2021, Zico signed a one-year contract with Liga 2 club PSG Pati. He made 6 league appearances for PSG Pati in the 2021 Liga 2 (Indonesia).

=== Persik Kediri ===
He was signed for Persik Kediri to play in Liga 1 in the 2022–23 season. Zico made his professional debut on 19 February 2023 in a match against PSM Makassar at the Gelora B.J. Habibie Stadium, Parepare.

==== Persipa Pati (loan) ====
Zico signed for Persipa Pati on 2023–24 season, on loan from Persik Kediri.

== International career ==
Zico was part of the Indonesia U-16 team that won the 2018 AFF U-16 Youth Championship and the Indonesia U-19 team that finished third in 2019 AFF U-19 Youth Championship.

== Style of play ==
Zico mainly operates as a forward.

== Honours ==
=== International ===
Indonesia U16

- JENESYS Japan-ASEAN U-16 Youth Football Tournament: 2017
- AFF U-16 Youth Championship: 2018

Indonesia U19

- AFF U-19 Youth Championship third place: 2019
