= Võ Nguyên Hoàng =

Vietnamese footballer

Personal information
- Full name: Võ Nguyên Hoàng
- Date of birth: 7 February 2002 (age 24)
- Place of birth: Hồng Ngự, Đồng Tháp, Vietnam
- Height: 1.80 m (5 ft 11 in)
- Position: Striker

Team information
- Current team: SHB Đà Nẵng
- Number: 28

Youth career
- 2015–2020: PVF

Senior career*
Years	Team	Apps	(Gls)
2019–2023	PVF-CAND	20	(1)
2020–2021	→ Sài Gòn (loan)	13	(1)
2023	→ Thanh Hóa (loan)	2	(0)
2023–2026	Đông Á Thanh Hóa	43	(2)
2026–	SHB Đà Nẵng	11	(2)

International career^{‡}
2017–2018	Vietnam U16	11	(4)
2019–2021	Vietnam U19	10	(4)
2022–2024	Vietnam U23	12	(1)
Medal record
Men's football
Representing Vietnam
AFF U-17 Youth Championship
Winner	Thailand 2017
AFF U-23 Championship
Winner	Cambodia 2022	Team
- * Club domestic league appearances and goals as of 7 June 2026 ‡ National team caps and goals as of 24 September 2023

Võ Nguyên Hoàng (born 7 February 2002) is a Vietnamese professional footballer who plays as a striker for V.League 1 club SHB Đà Nẵng.

== Club career ==
Before entering the second leg of 2020 V.League 1, Hoàng joined Saigon FC on loan from the PVF Football Academy. On 14 October, he scored his first V.League 1 goal, in a 3–1 loss against Becamex Binh Duong.

On 30 June 2023, Hoàng signed for Dong A Thanh Hoa on loan until the end of the season. In October 2023, he joined Dong A Thanh Hoa on a permanent transfer, signing a 5-year contract.

== International career ==
Hoàng took part in the 2022 AFF U-23 Championship with Vietnam U23. He made one appearance in the final against Thailand, which ended in a 1–0 victory for Vietnam.

== Career statistics ==
=== Club ===
As of 29 October 2020.

Club	Season	League			Cup		Continental		Other		Total	
Club	Season	Division	Apps	Goals	Apps	Goals	Apps	Goals	Apps	Goals	Apps	Goals
Saigon FC (loan)	2020	V.League 1	4	1	0	0	–		0	0	4	1
Career total			4	1	0	0	0	0	0	0	4	1

=== International goals ===
==== Vietnam U16 ====
No.	Date	Venue	Opponent	Score	Result	Competition
1.	14 July 2017	IPE Chonburi Stadium, Chonburi, Thailand	Philippines	4–0	7–0	2017 AFF U-15 Championship
2.	20 July 2017	Chonburi Stadium, Chonburi, Thailand	Australia	2–0	2–0	2017 AFF U-15 Championship

==== Vietnam U19 ====
No.	Date	Venue	Opponent	Score	Result	Competition
1.	9 August 2019	Thống Nhất Stadium, Hồ Chí Minh City, Vietnam	Australia	1–3	1–4	2019 AFF U-19 Youth Championship
2.	11 August 2019	Gò Đậu Stadium, Thủ Dầu Một, Vietnam	Singapore	2–0	3–0	2019 AFF U-19 Youth Championship

== Honours ==
PVF-CAND

- Vietnamese National Cup third place: (bronze) 2023

Thanh Hóa

- Vietnamese National Cup: (gold) 2023, 2023–24

Vietnam U15

- AFF U-15 Championship: (gold) 2017

Vietnam U16

- JENESYS Japan-ASEAN U-16 Youth Football Tournament runner-up: 2017

Vietnam U23

- AFF U-23 Championship: (gold) 2022
