= David Maulana =

Indonesian footballer

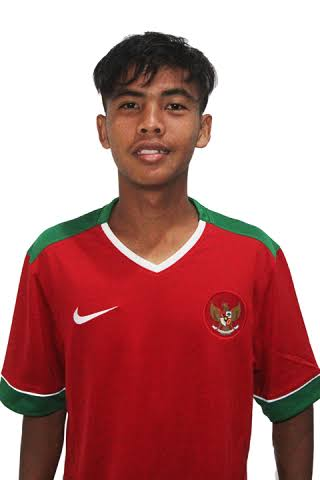
- David with Indonesia U16 in 2018

Personal information
- Full name: David Maulana
- Date of birth: 25 February 2002 (age 24)
- Place of birth: Deli Serdang, Indonesia
- Height: 1.69 m (5 ft 7 in)
- Position: Midfielder

Team information
- Current team: Semen Padang
- Number: 66

Youth career
- 2017: PSSA Asahan
- 2017: PPLP Medan
- 2018: PSMS Medan
- 2018–2020: Barito Putera
- 2019–2020: Garuda Select
- 2021–2022: Rijeka

Senior career*
Years	Team	Apps	(Gls)
2021–2022	→ Pomorac 1921 (loan)	16	(0)
2022–2026	Bhayangkara Presisi	42	(2)
2026	→ Persiku Kudus (loan)	13	(0)
2026–	Semen Padang	1	(0)

International career^{‡}
2017–2018	Indonesia U16	20	(3)
2019–2020	Indonesia U19	9	(3)
2023	Indonesia U23	1	(0)
Medal record
Men's football
Representing Indonesia
AFF U-16 Youth Championship
Winner	2018 Indonesia
AFF U-19 Youth Championship
Third place	2019 Vietnam
- * Club domestic league appearances and goals as of 13 September 2026 ‡ National team caps and goals as of 16 April 2023

David Maulana (born 25 February 2002) is an Indonesian professional footballer who plays as a midfielder for Championship club Semen Padang.

== Club career ==
=== Bhayangkara ===
He signed a contract with Bhayangkara to play in Liga 1 in the 2022 season. David made his league debut on 24 July 2022 in a match against Persib Bandung at the Wibawa Mukti Stadium, Cikarang.

== International career ==
David was part of the Indonesia U17 team that won the 2018 AFF U-16 Youth Championship and the Indonesia U19 team that finished third in 2019 AFF U-19 Youth Championship.

== Career statistics ==
=== Club ===
As of 13 September 2026

Club	Season	League			Cup		Other		Total	
Club	Season	Division	Apps	Goals	Apps	Goals	Apps	Goals	Apps	Goals
Pomorac 1921 (loan)	2021–22	3. NL	16	0	0	0	0	0	16	0
Bhayangkara	2022–23	Liga 1	11	0	0	0	2 (Note: Appearances in Indonesia President's Cup)	0	13	0
Bhayangkara	2023–24	Liga 1	29	2	0	0	0	0	29	2
Bhayangkara	2024–25	Liga 2	2	0	0	0	0	0	2	0
Bhayangkara	2025–26	Super League	0	0	0	0	0	0	0	0
Persiku Kudus (loan)	2025–26	Championship	13	0	0	0	0	0	13	0
Semen Padang	2026–27	Championship	1	0	0	0	0	0	1	0
Career total			72	2	0	0	2	0	74	2

== Honours ==
=== Club ===
Bhayangkara

- Liga 2 runner-up: 2024–25

=== International ===
Indonesia U16

- Thien Phong Plastic Cup: 2017
- JENESYS Japan-ASEAN U-16 Youth Football Tournament: 2017
- AFF U-16 Youth Championship: 2018

Indonesia U19

- AFF U-19 Youth Championship third place: 2019

=== Individual ===
- JENESYS Japan-ASEAN U-16 Youth Football Tournament Best Player: 2017
