= Rendy Juliansyah =

Indonesian footballer (born 2002)

Personal information
- Full name: Rendy Juliansyah
- Date of birth: 27 July 2002 (age 24)
- Place of birth: Tangerang, Indonesia
- Height: 1.81 m (5 ft 11 in)
- Position: Attacking midfielder

Team information
- Current team: Persijap Jepara
- Number: 30

Youth career
- 2010–2018: ASIOP
- 2018–2019: Leganés

Senior career*
Years	Team	Apps	(Gls)
2021	RANS Cilegon	1	(0)
2021	Sulut United	1	(0)
2022–2024	Persik Kediri	14	(1)
2023–2024	→ Persita Tangerang (loan)	4	(0)
2025	Sriwijaya	7	(0)
2026	PSPS Pekanbaru	4	(0)
2026–	Persijap Jepara	0	(0)

International career
2017–2018	Indonesia U16	16	(5)
2019	Indonesia U19	4	(2)
Medal record
Men's football
Representing Indonesia
AFF U-16 Youth Championship
Winner	2018 Indonesia
AFF U-19 Youth Championship
Third place	2019 Vietnam
- * Club domestic league appearances and goals as of 12 April 2026

Rendy Juliansyah (born 27 July 2002) is an Indonesian professional footballer who plays as an attacking midfielder for Super League club Persijap Jepara.

== Club career ==
=== RANS Cilegon ===
On 22 June 2021, Juliansyah signed a one-year contract with Liga 2 club RANS Cilegon. He made 2 league appearances for RANS Cilegon in the 2021 Liga 2 (Indonesia).

=== Persik Kediri ===
On 26 May 2022, he signed a contract with Persik Kediri to play in Liga 1 in the 2022 season. Juliansyah made his league debut on 23 August 2022 in a match against PSS Sleman at the Brawijaya Stadium, Kediri.

== International career ==
Juliansyah was part of the Indonesia U17 team that won the 2018 AFF U-16 Youth Championship and the Indonesia U19 team that finished third in the 2019 AFF U-19 Youth Championship.

== Career statistics ==
=== Club ===
As of 12 April 2026

Club	Season	League			Cup		Continental		Other		Total	
Club	Season	Division	Apps	Goals	Apps	Goals	Apps	Goals	Apps	Goals	Apps	Goals
RANS Cilegon	2021–22	Liga 2	1	0	0	0	–		0	0	1	0
Sulut United	2021–22	Liga 2	1	0	0	0	–		0	0	1	0
Persik Kediri	2022–23	Liga 1	12	1	0	0	–		0	0	12	1
Persik Kediri	2023–24	Liga 1	2	0	0	0	–		0	0	2	0
Persita Tangerang (loan)	2023–24	Liga 1	4	0	0	0	–		0	0	4	0
Sriwijaya	2025–26	Championship	7	0	0	0	—		0	0	7	0
PSPS Pekanbaru	2025–26	Championship	4	0	0	0	—		0	0	4	0
Career total			31	1	0	0	0	0	0	0	31	1

== Honours ==
=== International ===
Indonesia U16

- Thien Phong Plastic Cup: 2017
- JENESYS Japan-ASEAN U-16 Youth Football Tournament: 2017
- AFF U-16 Youth Championship: 2018

Indonesia U19

- AFF U-19 Youth Championship third place: 2019
