= Kim Hye-yong =

North Korean footballer (born 1981)

Personal information
- Date of birth: 25 August 1981 (age 45)
- Position: Midfielder

Senior career*
Years	Team	Apps	(Gls)
- April 25

International career
	North Korea	2+	
- * Club domestic league appearances and goals

Kim Hye-yong (born 25 August 1981,Korean: 김혜영) is a North Korean women's international footballer who plays as a midfielder. She is a member of the North Korea women's national football team. She was part of the team at the 2006 Asian Games, appearing in two matches during the tournament. On club level she played for April 25 in North Korea.
