= Khairul Imam Zakiri =

Indonesian footballer (born 2001)

Imam Zakiri
Personal information
- Full name: Khairul Imam Zakiri
- Date of birth: 19 December 2001 (age 24)
- Place of birth: Jakarta, Indonesia
- Height: 1.75 m (5 ft 9 in)
- Positions: Attacking midfielder; winger

Team information
- Current team: ASIOP
- Number: 8

Youth career
- 2011–2014: ASIOP
- 2014–2018: Real Valladolid
- 2018–2019: Leganés
- 2019–2020: Gimnástica Ceuta

Senior career*
| Years | Team | Apps | (Gls) |
| 2020–2021 | Polillas Ceuta | | |
| 2021 | Villarrobledo | | |
| 2021–2022 | ASIOP | 9 | (1) |
| 2022–2023 | Persita Tangerang | 6 | (0) |
| 2026– | ASIOP | 0 | (0) |

International career
| 2019–2020 | Indonesia U19 | 5 | (1) |
Medal record
Men's football
Representing Indonesia
AFF U-19 Youth Championship
| Third place | 2019 Vietnam |
- * Club domestic league appearances and goals as of 28 January 2023

Khairul Imam Zakiri (born 19 December 2001) is an Indonesian professional footballer who plays as an attacking midfielder or winger for Liga 4 club ASIOP.

== Club career ==
=== ASIOP FC ===
On 2021, Zakiri signed a one-year contract with Liga 3 club ASIOP. He made nine league appearances and scored one goal for ASIOP in the 2021 season.

=== Persita Tangerang ===
Zakiri signed for Persita Tangerang in Liga 1 for the 2022–23 season. He made his league debut on 14 September 2022 in a match against PSIS Semarang at the Indomilk Arena.

== International career ==
Zakiri was part of the Indonesia U-19 team that finished third in 2019 AFF U-19 Youth Championship. In August 2020, Zakiri was included on Indonesia national under-19 football team 30-man list for Training Center in Croatia.

== Career statistics ==
=== Club ===
As of 28 January 2023

| Club | Season | League | | | Cup | | Continental | | Other | | Total | |
| Club | Season | Division | Apps | Goals | Apps | Goals | Apps | Goals | Apps | Goals | Apps | Goals |
|---|---|---|---|---|---|---|---|---|---|---|---|---|
| ASIOP | 2021–22 | Liga 3 | 9 | 1 | 0 | 0 | 0 | 0 | 0 | 0 | 9 | 1 |
| Persita Tangerang | 2022–23 | Liga 1 | 6 | 0 | 0 | 0 | 0 | 0 | 0 | 0 | 6 | 0 |
| Career total | | | 15 | 1 | 0 | 0 | 0 | 0 | 0 | 0 | 15 | 1 |

== Honours ==
=== International ===
Indonesia U-19

- AFF U-19 Youth Championship third place: 2019
