= 2019 AFF U-18 Youth Championship =

Giải vô địch bóng đá U-18 Đông Nam Á 2019

Tournament details
- Host country: Vietnam
- Dates: 6–19 August
- Teams: 12 (from 1 sub-confederation)
- Venues: 5 (in 3 host cities)

Final positions
- Champions: Australia (5th title)
- Runners-up: Malaysia
- Third place: Indonesia
- Fourth place: Myanmar

Tournament statistics
- Matches played: 34
- Goals scored: 127 (3.74 per match)
- Attendance: 31,976 (940 per match)
- Top scorer(s): (Australia) Dylan Ruiz-Diaz (Indonesia) Bagus Kahfi (Timor-Leste) Mouzinho (6 goals each)
- Fair play award: Myanmar

The 2019 AFF U-18 Youth Championship or AFF U18 Next Media Cup 2019 was the 17th edition of the AFF U-19 Youth Championship, organised by ASEAN Football Federation. It was hosted by Vietnam during August 2019. Twelve member associations of the ASEAN Football Federation took part in the tournament featuring two groups of six teams.

Australia beat Malaysia 1–0 in the final for their fifth title in the championship.

== Participant teams ==
All of 12 teams from member associations of the ASEAN Football Federation are eligible for the tournament.

A total of 12 teams from 12 member associations entered the tournament, listed below:

Team	Association	App	Previous best performance
Australia	FF Australia	8th	Winners (2006, 2008, 2010, 2016)
Brunei	FA Brunei DS	9th	Group stage (8 times)
Cambodia	FF Cambodia	11th	Group stage (10 times)
Indonesia	FA Indonesia	10th	Winners (2013)
Laos	Lao FF	11th	Third place (2002, 2005, 2015)
Malaysia	FA Malaysia	13th	Winners (2018)
Myanmar	Myanmar FF	13th	Winners (2003, 2005)
Philippines	Philippine FF	9th	Group stage (8 times)
Singapore	FA Singapore	12th	Third place (2003)
Thailand	FA Thailand	16th	Winners (2002, 2009, 2011, 2015, 2017)
Timor-Leste	FF Timor-Leste	8th	Third place (2013)
Vietnam	Vietnam FF	16th	Winners (2007)

== Officials ==
Referees

- Lim Bunthoeun (Cambodia)
- Dwi Purba Adi Wicaksana (Indonesia)
- Thoriq Munir Alkatiri (Indonesia)
- Souei Vongkham (Laos)
- Xaypaseuth Phongsanit (Laos)
- Razlan Joffri Ali (Malaysia)
- Myat Thu (Myanmar)
- Clifford Daypuyat (Philippines)
- Ahmad A'qashah Ahmad Al'Badowe (Singapore)
- Mongkolchai Pechsri (Thailand)
- Wiwat Jumpaoon (Thailand)
- Ngô Duy Lân (Vietnam)

Assistant referees

- Owen Goldrick (Australia)
- Son Chanphearith (Cambodia)
- Bambang Syamsudar (Indonesia)
- Nurhadi (Indonesia)
- Kilar Ladsavong (Laos)
- Mohd Arif Shamil Abd Rasid (Malaysia)
- Mohd Shahreen Che Omar (Malaysia)
- Aye Chit Moe (Myanmar)
- Francis Engalgado (Philippines)
- Rachain Srichai (Thailand)
- Rawut Nakarit (Thailand)
- Phan Huy Hoàng (Vietnam)

== Group stage ==
- All times listed are ICT (UTC+7).

=== Group A ===
Pos	Team	Pld	W	D	L	GF	GA	GD	Pts	Qualification
1	Indonesia	5	4	1	0	20	4	+16	13	Knockout stage
2	Myanmar	5	4	1	0	11	3	+8	13	Knockout stage
3	Laos	5	3	0	2	8	5	+3	9	
4	Timor-Leste	5	2	0	3	12	13	−1	6	
5	Philippines	5	1	0	4	8	18	−10	3	
6	Brunei	5	0	0	5	4	20	−16	0	

Source: aseanfootball.org
6 August 2019
16:00

Laos	1–3	Myanmar
Tee 49'; Chony (red card) 83'	Report	Saw Kyaw Ae 29'; Wai Yan Soe 37'; Zaw Win Thein 90+1'

Gò Đậu Stadium, Thủ Dầu Một
Attendance: 225
Referee: Ahmad A'qashah (Singapore)
6 August 2019
19:00

Timor-Leste	7–2	Brunei
Expedito 12'; Gumario 32'; Lucas 45'; Mouzinho 82', 87'; Danilson 90', 90+2'	Report	Aisan Aiz. 48', 81'

Gò Đậu Stadium, Thủ Dầu Một
Attendance: 124
Referee: Ngô Duy Lân (Vietnam)
6 August 2019
15:30

Indonesia	7–1	Philippines
Zico 3'; Fajar 15'; Bagus 16', 24'; David 42'; Supriadi 78', 90+1'	Report	Ambong 66'

Dĩ An Football Field, Dĩ An
Attendance: 100
Referee: Mongkolchai Pechsri (Thailand)

8 August 2019
15:30

Laos	1–0	Brunei
Thanouthong 21'	Report

Dĩ An Football Field, Dĩ An
Attendance: 0
Referee: Razlan Joffri Ali (Malaysia)
8 August 2019
16:00

Indonesia	4–0	Timor-Leste
David 9'; Salman 42'; Beckham 45+2' (pen.); Zico 80'	Report	S. da Silva (red card) 90+7'

Gò Đậu Stadium, Thủ Dầu Một
Attendance: 300
Referee: Wiwat Jumpaoon (Thailand)
8 August 2019
19:00

Myanmar	4–1	Philippines
Kaung Khant Kyaw 10'; La Min Htwe 45+1'; Moe Swe 54'; Hein Htet Aung 71'	Report	Tacardon 90+1'

Gò Đậu Stadium, Thủ Dầu Một
Attendance: 87
Referee: Lim Bunthoeun (Cambodia)

10 August 2019
19:00

Philippines	0–1	Laos
	Report	Akkhom 81'

Gò Đậu Stadium, Thủ Dầu Một
Attendance: 123
Referee: Ahmad A'qashah (Singapore)
10 August 2019
16:00

Brunei	1–6	Indonesia
Hilmi 60'	Report	Bagus 8', 76'; Rendy 11' (pen.), 44'; Beckham 25'; Zakiri 34'

Gò Đậu Stadium, Thủ Dầu Một
Attendance: 100
Referee: Ngô Duy Lân (Vietnam)
10 August 2019
15:30

Myanmar	1–0	Timor-Leste
Moe Swe 71'	Report

Thống Nhất Stadium, Ho Chi Minh City
Attendance: 65
Referee: Mongkolchai Pechsri (Thailand)

12 August 2019
16:00

Timor-Leste	5–2	Philippines
Mouzinho 30', 56', 60', 89'; Kornelis 90+2'	Report	Dorin 60'; Bugas 77'

Gò Đậu Stadium, Thủ Dầu Một
Attendance: 180
Referee: Razlan Joffri Ali (Malaysia)
12 August 2019
19:00

Brunei	0–2	Myanmar
	Report	Pyae Phyo Aung 55'; Moe Swe 73'

Gò Đậu Stadium, Thủ Dầu Một
Attendance: 122
Referee: Wiwat Jumpaoon (Thailand)
12 August 2019
15:30

Indonesia	2–1	Laos
Bagus 72'; Anoulack 90+1' (o.g.)	Report	Alounnay 70'

Thống Nhất Stadium, Ho Chi Minh City
Attendance: 236
Referee: Lim Bunthoeun (Cambodia)

14 August 2019
19:00

Philippines	4–1	Brunei
Bugas 18'; Dorin 25', 79', 82'	Report	Aisan Aiz. 87'

Gò Đậu Stadium, Thủ Dầu Một
Attendance: 150
Referee: Wiwat Jumpaoon (Thailand)
14 August 2019
16:00

Laos	4–0	Timor-Leste
Chony 13'; Thanouthong 30'; Phouvieng 83'; Bounmy 90+3'	Report

Gò Đậu Stadium, Thủ Dầu Một
Attendance: 108
Referee: Myat Thu (Myanmar)
14 August 2019
15:30

Myanmar	1–1	Indonesia
Hein Htet Aung 50'	Report	Rizky 68'

Thống Nhất Stadium, Ho Chi Minh City
Attendance: 122
Referee: Xaypaseuth Phongsanit (Laos)

=== Group B ===
Pos	Team	Pld	W	D	L	GF	GA	GD	Pts	Qualification
1	Australia	5	4	0	1	17	6	+11	12	Knockout stage
2	Malaysia	5	3	0	2	9	3	+6	9	Knockout stage
3	Vietnam (H)	5	2	1	2	6	6	0	7	
4	Cambodia	5	2	0	3	7	13	−6	6	
5	Thailand	5	1	2	2	6	8	−2	5	
6	Singapore	5	1	1	3	3	12	−9	4	

Source: aseanfootball.org
(H) Hosts
7 August 2019
15:30

Thailand	1–1	Singapore
Achitpol 50'	Report	Danish 90'

Thành Long Stadium, Ho Chi Minh City
Attendance: 150
Referee: Thoriq Alkatiri (Indonesia)
7 August 2019
16:30

Cambodia	1–5	Australia
Chanthea 74'	Report	Trewin 3'; Ruiz-Diaz 5'; McCarthy 19'; Brooks 65', 90+3'

Thống Nhất Stadium, Ho Chi Minh City
Attendance: 295
Referee: Xaypaseuth Phongsanit (Laos)
7 August 2019
19:30

Vietnam	1–0	Malaysia
Võ Minh Trọng 89'	Report

Thống Nhất Stadium, Ho Chi Minh City
Attendance: 5,279
Referee: Clifford Daypuyat (Philippines)

9 August 2019
16:30

Malaysia	3–1	Singapore
Firdaus K. 6', 51'; Luqman 88'	Report	Zamani 75'

Thống Nhất Stadium, Ho Chi Minh City
Attendance: 355
Referee: Dwi Purba Wicaksana (Indonesia)
9 August 2019
15:30

Thailand	3–4	Cambodia
Guntapon 68', 90+7'; Thirapak 76'	Report	Tola 53'; Chatmongkol 75' (o.g.); Chanthea 87', 88'

Thành Long Stadium, Ho Chi Minh City
Attendance: 150
Referee: Myat Thu (Myanmar)
9 August 2019
19:30

Vietnam	1–4	Australia
Võ Nguyên Hoàng 45+2'	Report	Tilio 1', 34', 90+3'; Brook 13'

Thống Nhất Stadium, Ho Chi Minh City
Attendance: 4,535
Referee: Souei Vongkham (Laos)

11 August 2019
19:30

Singapore	0–3	Vietnam
	Report	Trần Mạnh Quỳnh 29'; Võ Nguyên Hoàng 47'; Nguyễn Kim Nhật 63'

Gò Đậu Stadium, Thủ Dầu Một
Attendance: 2,065
Referee: Xaypaseuth Phongsanit (Laos)
11 August 2019
16:30

Australia	3–1	Thailand
Ruiz-Diaz 57', 78'; Carluccio 68'	Report	Natcha 82'

Gò Đậu Stadium, Thủ Dầu Một
Attendance: 418
Referee: Clifford Daypuyat (Philippines)
11 August 2019
15:30

Malaysia	3–0	Cambodia
Mukhairi 18'; Muslihuddin 38'; Firdaus R. 45+2'	Report

Thành Long Stadium, Ho Chi Minh City
Attendance: 200
Referee: Thoriq Alkatiri (Indonesia)

13 August 2019
16:30

Cambodia	0–1	Singapore
	Report	Azri 67'

Thống Nhất Stadium, Ho Chi Minh City
Attendance: 468
Referee: Thoriq Alkatiri (Indonesia)
13 August 2019
15:30

Australia	0–3	Malaysia
	Report	Luqman 17', 39'; Azam 27'

Thành Long Stadium, Ho Chi Minh City
Attendance: 300
Referee: Souei Vongkham (Laos)
13 August 2019
19:30

Thailand	0–0	Vietnam
	Report

Thống Nhất Stadium, Ho Chi Minh City
Attendance: 10,550
Referee: Dwi Purba Wicaksana (Indonesia)

15 August 2019
16:00

Singapore	0–5	Australia
	Report	Monge 23'; Ruiz-Diaz 35', 39', 79'; Iannucci 73'

Gò Đậu Stadium, Thủ Dầu Một
Attendance: 356
Referee: Mongkolchai Pechsri (Thailand)
15 August 2019
16:00

Vietnam	1–2	Cambodia
Nguyễn Kim Nhật 90+2'	Report	Chanthea 50'; Lieng 90+5'

Thống Nhất Stadium, Ho Chi Minh City
Attendance: 2,564
Referee: Souei Vongkham (Laos)
15 August 2019
16:00

Malaysia	0–1	Thailand
	Report	Sitthinan 69'

Thành Long Stadium, Ho Chi Minh City
Attendance: 300
Referee: Clifford Daypuyat (Philippines)

== Knockout stage ==
In the knockout stage, the penalty shoot-out is used to decide the winner if necessary.

=== Bracket ===
Semi-finals
17 August – Thủ Dầu Một
Indonesia	3
Malaysia (a.e.t.)	4
17 August – Thủ Dầu Một
Australia	2
Myanmar	1

Final
19 August – Ho Chi Minh City
Malaysia	0
Australia	1
Third Place
19 August – Ho Chi Minh City
Indonesia	5
Myanmar	0

=== Semi-finals ===
17 August 2019
16:30

Indonesia	3–4 (a.e.t.)	Malaysia
Bagus 45'; Fajar 80'; Brylian 83'	Report	Aiman 19'; Luqman 54'; Harith 84' (pen.), 99'

Gò Đậu Stadium, Thủ Dầu Một
Attendance: 564
Referee: Mongkolchai Pechsri (Thailand)
17 August 2019
19:30

Australia	2–1	Myanmar
Brook 56'; Trewin 77'	Report	La Min Htwe 18'

Gò Đậu Stadium, Thủ Dầu Một
Attendance: 251
Referee: Ahmad A'qashah (Singapore)

=== Third place match ===
19 August 2019
16:30

Indonesia	5–0	Myanmar
Beckham 37', 45+1'; Supriadi 38', 42', 45+3'	Report

Thống Nhất Stadium, Ho Chi Minh City
Attendance: 275
Referee: Souei Vongkham (Laos)

=== Final ===
19 August 2019
19:30

Malaysia	0–1	Australia
	Report	Brook 79'

Thống Nhất Stadium, Ho Chi Minh City
Attendance: 859
Referee: Ngô Duy Lân (Vietnam)

== Winner ==
2019 AFF U-18 Youth Championship Winners
(Australia)
Australia
5th title

== Awards ==
Top Scorer Award	Fair Play Award
(Australia) Dylan Ruiz-Diaz (Indonesia) Bagus Kahfi (Timor-Leste) Mouzinho	Myanmar

== Goalscorers ==
There were 127 goals scored in 34 matches, for an average of 3.74 goals per match.

6 goals

- (Australia) Dylan Ruiz-Diaz
- (Indonesia) Bagus Kahfi
- (Timor-Leste) Mouzinho Barreto de Lima

5 goals

- (Indonesia) Mochammad Supriadi

4 goals

- (Cambodia) Sieng Chanthea
- (Indonesia) Beckham Putra
- (Malaysia) Luqman Hakim Shamsudin
- (Philippines) Carlo Guanzon Dorin

3 goals

- (Australia) Lachlan Brook
- (Australia) Marco Tilio
- (Brunei) Aisan Aizuddin Abdullah Aiman
- (Myanmar) Moe Swe

2 goals

- (Australia) Kai Trewin
- (Australia) Lleyton Brooks
- (Indonesia) David Maulana
- (Indonesia) Fajar Fathur Rahman
- (Indonesia) Rendy Juliansyah
- (Indonesia) Sutan Zico
- (Laos) Thanouthong Kietnalonglop
- (Malaysia) Harith Haiqal Adam
- (Malaysia) Muhammad Firdaus Kaironnisam
- (Myanmar) Hein Htet Aung
- (Myanmar) La Min Htwe
- (Philippines) Pocholo Bugas
- (Thailand) Guntapon Keereeleang
- (Timor-Leste) Danilson Araujo
- (Vietnam) Nguyễn Kim Nhật
- (Vietnam) Võ Nguyên Hoàng

1 goal

- (Australia) Fabian Monge
- (Australia) Gianluca Iannucci
- (Australia) Harry McCarthy
- (Australia) Jarrod Carluccio
- (Brunei) Mohd Hilmi Sidik
- (Cambodia) Thy Lieng
- (Cambodia) Wut Tola
- (Indonesia) Brylian Aldama
- (Indonesia) Khairul Imam Zakiri
- (Indonesia) Salman Alfarid
- (Indonesia) Rizky Ridho
- (Laos) Akkhom Thoranin
- (Laos) Alounnay Lounlasy
- (Laos) Bounmy Pinkeo
- (Laos) Chony Wenpaserth
- (Laos) Phouvieng Phounsavath
- (Laos) Tee Sihalath
- (Malaysia) Mohd Aiman Afif
- (Malaysia) Muhammad Azam Azmi Murad
- (Malaysia) Muhammad Firdaus Ramli
- (Malaysia) Muhd Muslihuddin Atiq
- (Malaysia) Mukhairi Ajmal
- (Myanmar) Kaung Khant Kyaw
- (Myanmar) Pyae Phyo Aung
- (Myanmar) Saw Kyaw Ae
- (Myanmar) Wai Yan Soe
- (Myanmar) Zaw Win Thein
- (Philippines) Alimar Ambong
- (Philippines) Francis Arturo Tacardon
- (Singapore) Danish Qayyum Putra
- (Singapore) Muhammad Azri Suhaili Azar
- (Singapore) Muhammad Zamani Zamri
- (Thailand) Achitpol Keereerom
- (Thailand) Natcha Promsomboon
- (Thailand) Sitthinan Rungrueang
- (Thailand) Thirapak Prueangna
- (Timor-Leste) Dom Lucas Braz
- (Timor-Leste) Expedito da Conceição
- (Timor-Leste) Gumario Da Silva Moreira
- (Timor-Leste) Kornelis Nahak Portela
- (Vietnam) Trần Mạnh Quỳnh
- (Vietnam) Võ Minh Trọng

1 own goal

- (Laos) Anoulack Vannalath (against Indonesia)
- (Thailand) Chatmongkol Rueangthanarot (against Cambodia)

== Final ranking ==
Pos	Team	Pld	W	D	L	GF	GA	GD	Pts	Final result
1	Australia	7	6	0	1	20	7	+13	18	Champion
2	Malaysia	7	4	0	3	13	7	+6	12	Runner up
3	Indonesia	7	5	1	1	28	8	+20	16	Third place
4	Myanmar	7	4	1	2	12	10	+2	13	Fourth place
5	Laos	5	3	0	2	8	5	+3	9	Eliminated in group stage
6	Vietnam	5	2	1	2	6	6	0	7	Eliminated in group stage
7	Timor-Leste	5	2	0	3	12	13	−1	6	Eliminated in group stage
8	Cambodia	5	2	0	3	7	13	−6	6	Eliminated in group stage
9	Thailand	5	1	2	2	6	8	−2	5	Eliminated in group stage
10	Singapore	5	1	1	3	3	12	−9	4	Eliminated in group stage
11	Philippines	5	1	0	4	8	18	−10	3	Eliminated in group stage
12	Brunei	5	0	0	5	4	20	−16	0	Eliminated in group stage

Source: Group stage, Knockout stage
