= Luqman Hakim (footballer) =

Malaysian footballer

Personal information
- Full name: Luqman Hakim bin Shamsuddin
- Date of birth: 5 March 2002 (age 24)
- Place of birth: Kota Bharu, Kelantan, Malaysia
- Height: 1.70 m (5 ft 7 in)
- Position: Striker

Team information
- Current team: Negeri Sembilan
- Number: 10

Youth career
- 2014–2015: NFDP
- 2015–2019: AMD

Senior career*
Years	Team	Apps	(Gls)
2020	Selangor II	0	(0)
2020–2025	Kortrijk	2	(0)
2023	→ Njarðvík (loan)	9	(1)
2024	→ YSCC Yokohama (loan)	8	(0)
2025–	Negeri Sembilan	18	(5)

International career^{‡}
2017–2018	Malaysia U16	6	(7)
2019	Malaysia U19	10	(9)
2019–2025	Malaysia U23	14	(3)
2021–	Malaysia	9	(0)
Medal record
Men's football
Representing Malaysia
AFF U-19 Youth Championship
Second place	2019 Vietnam
- * Club domestic league appearances and goals as of 8 June 2026 ‡ National team caps and goals as of 23 April 2024

Luqman Hakim bin Shamsuddin (Jawi: لقمان الحكيم بن الشمس الدين, IPA: [luqman hakɪm bɪn ʃamsudɪn]; born 5 March 2002) is a Malaysian professional footballer who plays as a striker for Malaysia Super League club Negeri Sembilan and the Malaysia national team.

== Early career ==
Luqman Hakim Shamsudin was first discovered by National Football Development Programme of Malaysia (NFDP) before starting his youth career at Mokhtar Dahari Academy. He was named in Goal Malaysia's NxGn 2020 list as one of the country's biggest talents.

== Club career ==
=== Selangor FC II ===
Luqman Hakim as a youngster, who helped Malaysia win the 2019 AFF U-18 Youth Championship final, was due to ink a five-year deal with his new team when he turned 18 in March 2020. However, his move fell through due to the COVID-19 pandemic and he ended up joining Malaysian club Selangor FC II instead. Luqman stressed that he remained keen on a move to Europe, though, when the time was right.

Luqman Hakim eventually got his move to Kortrijk in July 2020, with Selangor announcing the move through an official statement.

=== KV Kortrijk ===
On 20 September 2019, it was confirmed that Luqman Hakim had signed a five-year deal with Belgian First Division side Kortrijk, a club owned by Malaysian businessman Vincent Tan.

He is the first Malaysian player to be allowed to sign a professional contract before the age of 18. Luqman Hakim was supposed to be able to join the club in March 2020, but this was postponed due to the COVID-19 pandemic. He was finally introduced by the club to the press on 6 August 2020 through a video on the club's Facebook page.

On 4 September 2020, Luqman Hakim made his debut for the first-team during a friendly match against BX Brussels, in which he scored the second goal. KV Kortrijk won the match 2–1. On 24 October 2020, Luqman Hakim was selected for the first team against Anderlecht and he made his league debut after coming on as a substitute in the 74th minute, with the match ending with a 1–3 loss for Kortrijk.

In October 2022, according to a source close to the player, Luqman Hakim is showing improvement after two seasons in Europe, and is slowly gaining the trust of his coach in the under-21 squad of KV Kortrijk. The coach of the main squad wanted to play him in a league match against Antwerp, but he was injured. Luqman Hakim is said to be focused on the under-21 squad and is working hard to get a place in the main squad. The source added there is no truth to the rumor that he will be returning to Malaysia in the near future. Early February 2023, Icelandic second level football club Njarðvík reported that Luqman would spend the full year 2023 on loan to them.

==== Njarðvík (loan) ====
On 7 February 2023, Luqman Hakim was loaned out to Iceland club Njarðvík on a one-year loan in the 1. deild karla league as Luqman Hakim was looking for more playing time, according to Kortrijk director of football.

On 8 April 2023, Luqman Hakim made his first team debut for Njarðvík after selected for starting eleven in Icelandic Men's Football Cup round of 32 against Augnablik and won 3–2. Luqman also made his first assist in his team debut. On 20 April 2023, Luqman Hakim made his first official goal for team the in a 4–1 win against Fjarðabyggð / Leiknir in round of 16 of Icelandic Men's Football Cup. He scored in the 93rd minute of the match.

==== YSCC Yokohama (loan) ====
On 16 January 2024, Luqman Hakim joined YSCC Yokohama currently in J3 League on loan for the rest of the 2023–24 season. His decision to joined YSCC Yokohama is based on looking for more play time with the club. He made his debut in a J.League Cup match against Mito Hollyhock on 6 March 2024 coming in as a substitute in the 77th minutes. On 9 March 2024, Luqman Hakim made his J3 League debut as a starting eleven against Matsumoto Yamaga.

=== Negeri Sembilan ===
After spending five years playing abroad, he began a new chapter of his career back in his home country when he was announced as the latest signing for the Malaysia Super League club Negeri Sembilan on 13 June 2025 ahead of the 2025–26 season.

== International career ==
=== Youth ===
Luqman has represented Malaysia at all youth level from the under 16-side to the under-23 sides. He was part of the national team for the 2018 AFC U-16 Championship that took place in Kuala Lumpur, Malaysia. On 20 September 2018, he made an emphatic start to the AFC U-16 Championship with a 6–2 win over Tajikistan. In that match, he scored five goals. Luqman also assisted Najmuddin Akmal goal in the opening group-stage match. He played every minute of Malaysia's campaign at the tournament, which saw them eliminated at the group stage.

He later moved up to the under 19s squad for 2019 AFF U-19 Youth Championship in the Vietnam. Luqman played a large role in the Malaysia under-19s progression to the semi-finals. He scored 8 goals in 5 appearances during the matches. He played in the final against Australia which Malaysia lost 1–0.

On 2 November 2019, Luqman was named in the 20-man Malaysia Squad for the 2019 Sea Games.

=== Senior ===
In May 2021, Luqman was called up to the Malaysian national team for the friendly match against Bahrain and the 2022 FIFA World Cup qualification matches against the United Arab Emirates, Vietnam and Thailand. He debuted on 28 May 2021 in a 2–0 defeat against Bahrain.

== Career statistics ==
=== Club ===
As of 8 June 2026.

Appearances and goals by club, season and competition
Club	Season	League			Cup (Note: Includes Malaysia FA Cup, Belgian Cup, Icelandic Men's Football Cup, Emperor's Cup)		League Cup (Note: Includes Malaysia Cup, J.League Cup)		Total	
Club	Season	Division	Apps	Goals	Apps	Goals	Apps	Goals	Apps	Goals
Selangor II	2020	Malaysia Premier League	—		—		—		—	
Kortrijk	2020–21	Belgian First Division A	1	0	0	0	—		1	0
Kortrijk	2021–22	Belgian First Division A	0	0	0	0	—		0	0
Kortrijk	2022–23	Belgian First Division A	1	0	1	0	—		2	0
Kortrijk	Total		2	0	1	0	—		3	0
Njarðvík (loan)	2023	1. deild karla	9	1	3	1	—		12	2
Njarðvík (loan)	Total		9	1	3	1	—		12	2
Yokohama (loan)	2024	J3 League	8	0	0	0	1	0	9	0
Yokohama (loan)	Total		8	0	0	0	1	0	9	0
Negeri Sembilan	2025–26	Malaysia Super League	18	5	2	0	4	1	24	6
Negeri Sembilan	2026–27	Malaysia Super League	0	0	0	0	0	0	0	0
Negeri Sembilan	Total		18	5	2	0	4	1	24	6
Career total			37	6	6	1	5	1	48	8

=== International ===
As of 26 March 2022

Appearances and goals by national team and year
National team	Year	Apps	Goals
Malaysia	2021	8	0
Malaysia	2022	1	0
Total		9	0

== Honours ==
Malaysia U19

- AFF U-19 Youth Championship winner: 2019

Individual

- AFC U-16 Championship top scorer: 2018
- Southeast Asian Games top scorer: 2021
