= Jarrod Carluccio =

Australian soccer player

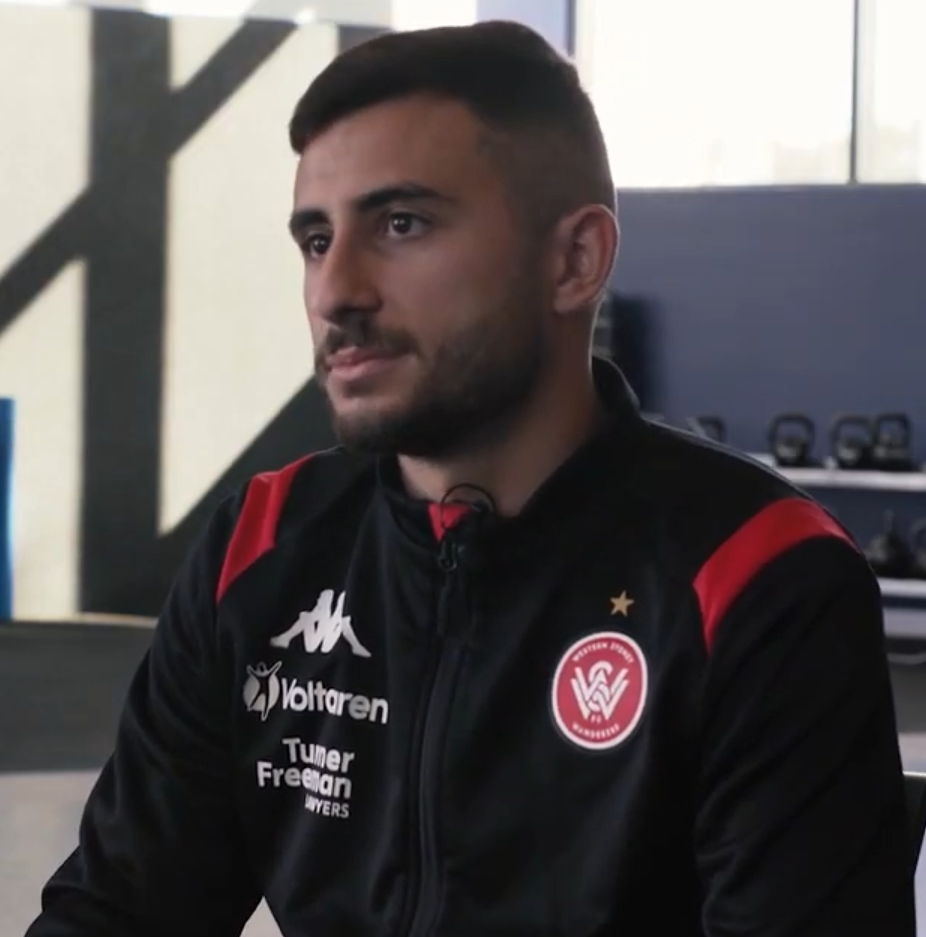
- Carluccio with Western Sydney Wanderers in 2023

Personal information
- Full name: Jarrod Carluccio
- Date of birth: 8 February 2001 (age 25)
- Place of birth: Liverpool, New South Wales, Australia
- Height: 1.78 m (5 ft 10 in)
- Position: Winger

Team information
- Current team: Western Sydney Wanderers
- Number: 17

Youth career
- Blacktown Spartans

Senior career*
| Years | Team | Apps | (Gls) |
| 2015 | Blacktown Spartans | 1 | (0) |
| 2016–2023 | Western Sydney Wanderers NPL | 74 | (7) |
| 2020–2024 | Western Sydney Wanderers | 19 | (1) |
| 2023–2024 | → Perth Glory (loan) | 23 | (1) |
| 2024–2025 | Perth Glory | 12 | (1) |
| 2025– | Western Sydney Wanderers | 0 | (0) |

International career^{‡}
| 2019–2020 | Australia U20 | 8 | (2) |

Managerial career
- 2022: Western Rage
Medal record
Men's football
Representing Australia
AFF U-19 Youth Championship
| First place | 2019 Vietnam | U-20 Team |
- * Club domestic league appearances and goals as of 15 January 2025 ‡ National team caps and goals as of 15 March 2020

Jarrod Carluccio (Italian: [karˈlu:t.tʃo]; born 8 February 2001) is an Australian professional soccer player who plays as a winger for Western Sydney Wanderers.

== Career ==
On 15 June 2022, Carluccio returned to Western Sydney Wanderers' first team.

On 13 September 2023, Carluccio was announced at Perth Glory on loan, with a view to a permanent move. On 4 June 2024, Carluccio signed a new contract extension with Perth Glory.

On 16 January 2025, Carluccio was announced at Western Sydney Wanderers on a one and a half season deal.

== Honours ==
=== International ===
Australia U20

- AFF U-19 Youth Championship: 2019
