= Haruki Shimokawa =

Japanese footballer

Personal information
- Date of birth: 20 August 2003 (age 23)
- Place of birth: Osaka, Japan
- Height: 1.83 m (6 ft 0 in)
- Position: Forward

Team information
- Current team: Cerezo Osaka U-23
- Number: 60

Youth career
- –2020: Cerezo Osaka

Senior career*
Years	Team	Apps	(Gls)
2020–	Cerezo Osaka U-23	1	(0)
- * Club domestic league appearances and goals as of 17:04, 5 January 2021 (UTC)

Haruki Shimokawa (下川 陽輝, Shimokawa Haruki; born 20 August 2003) is a Japanese footballer currently playing as a forward for Cerezo Osaka U-23.

== Career statistics ==
=== Club ===
As of 12 November 2020.

Club	Season	League			National Cup		League Cup		Other		Total	
Club	Season	Division	Apps	Goals	Apps	Goals	Apps	Goals	Apps	Goals	Apps	Goals
Cerezo Osaka U-23	2020	J3 League	1	0	–		–		0	0	1	0
Career total			1	0	0	0	0	0	0	0	1	0
