= 2017 JENESYS Japan-ASEAN U-16 Youth Football Tournament =

Tournament details
- Host country: Japan
- Dates: 8–12 March 2018
- Teams: 12

Final positions
- Champions: Indonesia
- Runners-up: Vietnam
- Third place: Japan
- Fourth place: Thailand

Tournament statistics
- Matches played: 24
- Goals scored: 115 (4.79 per match)

2017 Japan – East Asia Network of Exchange for Students and Youths (JENESYS) Japan-ASEAN U-16 Youth Football Tournament (Japanese: JENESYS2017 日ASEAN U-16サッカー交流大会, romanized: JENESYS 2017-nichi ASEAN U-16 sakkā kōryū taikai) was the second edition of the football tournament event promoted by Ministry of Foreign Affairs of Japan as part of the Japan Football Association's commitment to support the JENESYS exchange program. The tournament took place from 8 March until 12 March 2018.

Indonesia won the title after beating Vietnam 1–0 in the final.

== Qualified teams ==
There was no qualification and all entrants advanced to the final tournament. The following 10 teams from member associations of the ASEAN Football Federation and 2 teams from Japan entered the tournament.

Team	Association
Japan	Japan FA
(Japan) Miyazaki Selections	Japan FA
Thailand	FA Thailand
Vietnam	Vietnam FF
Cambodia	FF Cambodia
Brunei	FA Brunei DS
Indonesia	PSSI (FA Indonesia)
Laos	Lao FF
Malaysia	FA Malaysia
Philippines	Philippine FF
Singapore	FA Singapore
Timor-Leste	FF Timor-Leste

== Regulation ==
The rules were as follows.

- Matches consist of two halves and each half is 40 minutes long
- Each team will consist with male players under the age of 16
- 12 teams will be divided in 4 groups of 3 teams
- Round robin group stage followed by play-offs to decide rankings
- Each teams may select up to 18 players and 6 officials

== Group stage ==
- All matches played in Miyazaki Prefecture, Japan
- Times listed are local (UTC+9:00)

=== Group A ===
Pos	Team	Pld	W	D	L	GF	GA	GD	Pts	Qualification
1	Japan (H)	2	2	0	0	24	1	+23	6	Knockout phase
2	Malaysia	2	1	0	1	9	2	+7	3	Group stage second-place playoff
3	Timor-Leste	2	0	0	2	0	30	−30	0	Group stage third-place playoff

Source: JFA
(H) Hosts
8 March 2018
10:30

Japan	22–0	Timor-Leste
Maie 2', 21', 41', 42', 43'; Nakamura 11', 13', 19', 22', 45', 52', 67'; Higashi 38', 54', 56', 65'; Yamane 55', 71'; Shimokawa 69', 76'; Suwama 75', 78'	Report

Kirishima Yamazakura Miyazaki Prefectural Comprehensive Sports Park Pitch 1

9 March 2018
14:00

Japan	2–1	Malaysia
Shimokawa 40', 52'	Report	Fahmi 41'

Kirishima Yamazakura Miyazaki Prefectural Comprehensive Sports Park Pitch 1

10 March 2018
10:30

Malaysia	8–0	Timor-Leste
Najmudin 3'; Harith 27', 31'; Fahmi 35', 64'; Alif M. 60'; Amirul 73', 80+1'	Report

Kirishima Yamazakura Miyazaki Prefectural Comprehensive Sports Park Pitch 1

=== Group B ===
Pos	Team	Pld	W	D	L	GF	GA	GD	Pts	Qualification
1	Indonesia	2	2	0	0	12	1	+11	6	Knockout phase
2	Cambodia	2	1	0	1	3	5	−2	3	Group stage second-place playoff
3	Philippines	2	0	0	2	1	10	−9	0	Group stage third-place playoff

Source: JFA
8 March 2018
10:30

Indonesia	7–1	Philippines
Yadi 8'; Zico 15', 88'; David 31', 69'; Komang 73'; Bagas 84'	Report	? (?)

Kirishima Yamazakura Miyazaki Prefectural Comprehensive Sports Park Pitch 2

9 March 2018
14:00

Indonesia	5–0	Cambodia
Zico 2'; Hamsa 30', 83'; Supriadi 76', 78'	Report

Kirishima Yamazakura Miyazaki Prefectural Comprehensive Sports Park Pitch 2

10 March 2018
10:30

Cambodia	3–0	Philippines
	Report

Kirishima Yamazakura Miyazaki Prefectural Comprehensive Sports Park Pitch 2

=== Group C ===
Pos	Team	Pld	W	D	L	GF	GA	GD	Pts	Qualification
1	Thailand	2	2	0	0	12	0	+12	6	Knockout phase
2	Singapore	2	1	0	1	5	8	−3	3	Group stage second-place playoff
3	Brunei	2	0	0	2	0	9	−9	0	Group stage third-place playoff

Source: JFA
8 March 2018
14:00

Thailand	8–0	Singapore
Chatmongkol 5'; Suphanat 23', 29', 58', 80'; Nattakit 39'; Kittipong 50'; Jakkapong 56'	Report

Kirishima Yamazakura Miyazaki Prefectural Comprehensive Sports Park Pitch 1

9 March 2018
10:30

Thailand	4–0	Brunei
Kittipong 3'; Jakkapong (?); Nattakit 72'; Kittichai 80'	Report

Kirishima Yamazakura Miyazaki Prefectural Comprehensive Sports Park Pitch 1

10 March 2018
14:00

Brunei	0–5	Singapore
	Report

Kirishima Yamazakura Miyazaki Prefectural Comprehensive Sports Park Pitch 1

=== Group D ===
Pos	Team	Pld	W	D	L	GF	GA	GD	Pts	Qualification
1	Vietnam	2	1	1	0	2	1	+1	4	Knockout phase
2	Laos	2	1	0	1	2	2	0	3	Group stage second-place playoff
3	(Japan) Miyazaki Selections	2	0	1	1	0	1	−1	1	Group stage third-place playoff

Source: JFA
8 March 2018
14:00

Vietnam	2–1	Laos
Nguyễn Quốc Hoàng 48'; Hà Trung Hậu 51'	Report	? (?)

Kirishima Yamazakura Miyazaki Prefectural Comprehensive Sports Park Pitch 2

9 March 2018
10:30

Vietnam	0–0	(Japan) Miyazaki Selections
	Report

Kirishima Yamazakura Miyazaki Prefectural Comprehensive Sports Park Pitch 2

10 March 2018
14:00

Miyazaki Selections (Japan)	0–1	Laos
	Report

Kirishima Yamazakura Miyazaki Prefectural Comprehensive Sports Park Pitch 2

=== Group stage second-place playoff ===
11 March 2018
12:45

Malaysia	3–0	Cambodia
Alif M. 67'; Najmudin 75'; Ilham 80+1'	Report

Kirishima Yamazakura Miyazaki Prefectural Comprehensive Sports Park Pitch 1

11 March 2018
12:45

Singapore	1–1 (a.e.t.)	Laos
	Report
Penalties
	1–4

Kirishima Yamazakura Miyazaki Prefectural Comprehensive Sports Park Pitch 2

==== Fifth/sixth place playoff ====
12 March 2018
11:30

Malaysia	4–0	Laos
Alif M. 36'; Fahmi 48'; Alif D. 63'; Najmudin 70'	Report

Kirishima Yamazakura Miyazaki Prefectural Comprehensive Sports Park Pitch 1

==== Seventh/eighth place playoff ====
12 March 2018
11:30

Cambodia	1–2	Singapore
	Report

Kirishima Yamazakura Miyazaki Prefectural Comprehensive Sports Park Pitch 2

=== Group stage third-place playoff ===
11 March 2018
09:30

Timor-Leste	3–5	Philippines
	Report

Kirishima Yamazakura Miyazaki Prefectural Comprehensive Sports Park Pitch 1

11 March 2018
09:30

Brunei	0–0 (a.e.t.)	(Japan) Miyazaki Selections
	Report
Penalties
	4–5

Kirishima Yamazakura Miyazaki Prefectural Comprehensive Sports Park Pitch 2

==== Ninth/tenth place playoff ====
12 March 2018
09:00

Philippines	0–5	(Japan) Miyazaki Selections
	Report

Kirishima Yamazakura Miyazaki Prefectural Comprehensive Sports Park Pitch 1

==== Eleventh/twelfth place playoff ====
12 March 2018
09:00

Timor-Leste	2–8	Brunei
	Report

Kirishima Yamazakura Miyazaki Prefectural Comprehensive Sports Park Pitch 2

== Knockout phase ==
=== Semifinal ===
11 March 2018
16:00

Japan	0–1	Indonesia
	Report	Zico 54'

Kirishima Yamazakura Miyazaki Prefectural Comprehensive Sports Park Pitch 1

11 March 2018
16:00

Thailand	0–0 (a.e.t)	Vietnam
	Report
Penalties
	5–6

Kirishima Yamazakura Miyazaki Prefectural Comprehensive Sports Park Pitch 2

=== Third place playoff ===
12 March 2018
14:00

Japan	5–3	Thailand
Suzuki 4'; Maie 9'; Higashi 34'; Asano 41'; Nakamura 63'	Report	Panupong 28'; Suphanat 44'; Jiramet 70'

Kirishima Yamazakura Miyazaki Prefectural Comprehensive Sports Park Pitch 2

=== Final ===
12 March 2018
14:00

Indonesia	1–0	Vietnam
Rendy 64'	Report

Kirishima Yamazakura Miyazaki Prefectural Comprehensive Sports Park Pitch 1

== Statistics ==
=== Winner ===
2017 JENESYS Japan-ASEAN U-16 Youth Football Tournament Winners
(Indonesia)
Indonesia
First title

=== Tournament teams ranking ===
This table will show the ranking of teams throughout the tournament.

Pos	Team	Pld	W	D	L	GF	GA	GD	Pts	Final result
1	Indonesia	4	4	0	0	14	1	+13	12	Champion
2	Vietnam	4	2	1	1	2	2	0	7	Runner-up
3	Japan	4	3	0	1	29	5	+24	9	3rd place
4	Thailand	4	2	0	2	15	5	+10	6	4th place
5	Malaysia	4	3	0	1	16	2	+14	9	5th place
6	Laos	4	2	0	2	3	7	−4	6	6th place
7	Singapore	4	2	0	2	8	10	−2	6	7th place
8	Cambodia	4	1	0	3	4	10	−6	3	8th place
9	(Japan) Miyazaki Selections	4	2	1	1	5	1	+4	7	9th place
10	Philippines	4	1	0	3	6	18	−12	3	10th place
11	Brunei	4	1	0	3	8	11	−3	3	11th place
12	Timor-Leste	4	0	0	4	5	43	−38	0	12th place

Source: JFA
