= Gianluca Iannucci =

Australian soccer player

Personal information
- Full name: Gianluca Angelo Iannucci
- Date of birth: 18 June 2001 (age 25)
- Place of birth: Cobram, Victoria, Australia
- Height: 5 ft 7 in (1.70 m)
- Positions: Striker; winger; attacking midfielder

Team information
- Current team: Green Gully
- Number: 10

Youth career
- 2009–2013: Cobram SC
- 2014–2015: Goulburn Valley Suns
- 2016: Bulleen Lions

Senior career*
Years	Team	Apps	(Gls)
2017–2020	Melbourne City NPL	48	(13)
2019–2020	Melbourne City	0	(0)
2020–2021	Melbourne Victory	2	(1)
2021	Melbourne Victory NPL	12	(3)
2022–	Green Gully		

International career
2019	Australia U20	5	(2)
Medal record
Men's football
Representing Australia
AFF U-19 Youth Championship
First place	2019 Vietnam	U20 Team
- * Club domestic league appearances and goals as of 3 November 2022

Gianluca Iannucci (born 18 June 2001), is an Australian footballer who plays as a forward for Green Gully SC.

== Club career ==
=== Melbourne City ===
Iannucci was part of Melbourne City's senior squad, contracted on a scholarship contract until the end of the 2019–20 A-League season. In September 2020, Iannucci was released by Melbourne City at the end of his contract.

=== Melbourne Victory ===
Iannucci was announced as part of Melbourne Victory's 2020 AFC Champions League squad on 18 November 2020. On 24 November 2020 he made his professional debut in their clash against Beijing Sinobo Guoan. In December, it was confirmed that he is signed for the A-League season too.

== Honours ==
=== International ===
Australia U20

- AFF U-19 Youth Championship: 2019
