= Dylan Ruiz-Diaz =

Australian soccer player

Personal information
- Full name: Dylan Enrique Ruiz-Diaz
- Date of birth: 12 March 2001 (age 25)
- Place of birth: Prairiewood, New South Wales, Australia
- Height: 1.80 m (5 ft 11 in)
- Position: Forward

Team information
- Current team: Nakhon Si United
- Number: 10

Youth career
- AC United
- 2014: Blacktown City
- 2015: FNSW NTC
- 2016: Sydney FC
- 2017–2018: Western Sydney Wanderers
- 2018: Central Coast Mariners

Senior career*
Years	Team	Apps	(Gls)
2018–2020	CCM Academy	21	(7)
2019–2020	Central Coast Mariners	8	(2)
2021–2022	Sportis Łochowo	13	(7)
2021	→ Wisła Puławy (loan)	16	(1)
2022–2023	Juventud	11	(3)
2024	Londrina	0	(0)
2025	Sydney Olympic	25	(6)
2025–	Nakhon Si United	13	(2)

International career
2019	Australia U20	7	(7)
Medal record
Men's football
Representing Australia
AFF U-19 Youth Championship
First place	2019 Vietnam	U-20 Team
- * Club domestic league appearances and goals as of 22 January 2026

Dylan Enrique Ruiz-Diaz (born 12 March 2001) is an Australian professional soccer player who plays as a forward for Thai club Nakhon Si United.

== Club career ==
=== Central Coast Mariners ===
Ruiz-Diaz made his professional debut as a second-half substitute in a Round 26 clash with Western Sydney Wanderers, replacing Matt Simon in the 94th minute in a 3–1 win. On 20 January 2020, after 3 appearances in the A-League, he penned a one-year scholarship deal with the Mariners.

== Honours ==
Australia U20

- AFF U-19 Youth Championship: 2019

Individual

- AFF U-19 Youth Championship top scorer: 2019
