= Thanouthong Kietnalonglop =

Laotian footballer

Personal information
- Full name: Thanouthong Kietnalonglop
- Date of birth: 5 March 2001 (age 25)
- Place of birth: Khammouane, Laos
- Height: 1.64 m (5 ft 5 in)
- Position: Right-back

Team information
- Current team: Lao Army
- Number: 13

Youth career
- 2016–2020: Vientiane

Senior career*
Years	Team	Apps	(Gls)
2020–2024	Young Elephants	26	(0)
2024–	Lao Army		

International career
2019	Laos U19	3	(1)
2022–2023	Laos U23	7	(0)
2022–2023	Laos	5	(0)
- * Club domestic league appearances and goals as of 05:18, 24 April 2023 (UTC)

Thanouthong Kietnalonglop (ທະນູທອງ ກຽດນາລົງລົບ, born 5 Mar 2001) is a Laotian professional footballer who plays as a right-back.
