= Chatmongkol Rueangthanarot =

Thai footballer (born 2002)

Personal information
- Full name: Chatmongkol Rueangthanarot
- Date of birth: 9 May 2002 (age 24)
- Place of birth: Pathum Thani, Thailand
- Height: 1.73 m (5 ft 8 in)
- Position: Left back

Team information
- Current team: Nara
- Number: 67

Youth career
- 2013–2020: Chonburi

Senior career*
Years	Team	Apps	(Gls)
2020–	Chonburi	119	(3)
2020	→ Banbueng (loan)	1	(0)
2026–	→ Nara (loan)	0	(0)

International career
2017–2018	Thailand U16	23	(4)
2019	Thailand U19	11	(0)
2022–2023	Thailand U23	6	(0)
2022–2023	Thailand	4	(0)
Medal record
Thailand
Asean Football Championship
Winner	AFF Mitsubishi Electric Cup 2022	2022
- * Club domestic league appearances and goals as of 26 April 2025

Chatmongkol Rueangthanarot (Thai: ฉัตรมงคล เรืองฐณโรจน์, born 9 May 2002) is a Thai professional footballer who plays as a left back for Thai League 3 club Nara and the Thailand national team.

== Club career ==
=== Chonburi ===
Chatmongkol learned to play football in the youth team of Chonburi. There, he signed his first professional contract in 2020. However, from January to the end of June 2020, he was loaned to third division side Banbueng. At the beginning of July 2020, he returned to the Sharks after the loan. He made his league debut for Chonburi on 13 September 2020, playing the entire match against Trat.

== International career ==
On 15 October 2021, Rueangthanarot was called up to the Thailand under-23 for the 2022 AFC U-23 Asian Cup qualification phase.

In 2022 he was in the squad of Thailand for the 2022 King's Cup and 2022 AFF Championship.

== Honours ==
=== Club ===
Chonburi FC

- Thai League 2: 2024–25
- Thai FA Cup : Runner-up 2020–21

=== International ===
Thailand

- AFF Championship: 2022

Thailand U23

- SEA Games (silver) Silver medal: 2023
