= Laos national football team results (2020–present) =

This article details the fixtures and results of the Laos national football team from 2020 until present.

== Results ==
Keynotes
Win
Draw
Defeat

=== 2020 ===
No matches were played in 2020 due to the COVID-19 pandemic.

=== 2021 ===
6 December 2020 AFF Championship	Laos	0–2	Vietnam	Bishan, Singapore
20:30 UTC+8		Report (AFFSZ); Highlights (AFFSZ)	Nguyễn Công Phượng 26'; Phan Văn Đức 55'	Stadium: Bishan Stadium; Attendance: 812; Referee: Ahmad Yaqoub Ibrahim (Jordan)

9 December 2020 AFF Championship	Malaysia	4–0	Laos	Bishan, Singapore
17:30 UTC+8	Safawi 7' 35' 80'; Shahrul 78'	Report (AFFSZ)		Stadium: Bishan Stadium; Attendance: 427; Referee: Ammar Ebrahim Mahfoodh (Bahrain)

12 December 2020 AFF Championship	Laos	1–5	Indonesia	Bishan, Singapore
17:30 UTC+8	Souvanny 41'	Report (AFFSZ)	Asnawi 23'; Jaya 34'; Suleaman 56'; Walian 77'; Dimas 84'	Stadium: Bishan Stadium; Attendance: 207; Referee: Kim Hee-gon (South Korea)

15 December 2020 AFF Championship	Cambodia	3–0	Laos	Bishan, Singapore
17:30 UTC+8	Vathanaka 31' 41'; Chanthea 74'	Report (affsz)		Stadium: Bishan Stadium; Attendance: 129; Referee: Ahmad A'Qashah (Singapore)

=== 2022 ===
23 March Friendly	Laos	1–0	Mongolia	Vientiane, Laos
18:00 UTC+7	Chanthalangsy 58'	Report		Stadium: New Laos National Stadium; Attendance: 3,880; Referee: Songkran Bunmeekiart (Thailand)

27 March Friendly	Laos	3–2	Brunei	Vientiane, Laos
18:00 UTC+7	Sangvilay 6'; Wenpaserth 27'; Kongmathilath 33'	Report	Azwan 39'; Hakeme 72'	Stadium: New Laos National Stadium; Attendance: 5,215; Referee: Wiwat Champaoon (Thailand)

24 September Friendly	Laos	1–3	Maldives	Bandar Seri Begawan, Brunei
15:00 UTC+7	Bounkong 43'	Report	Raif 11'; Waheed 60'; Nihan 68'	Stadium: Track & Field Sports Complex; Referee: Thoriq Munir Alkatiri (Indonesia)

27 September Friendly	Brunei	1–0	Laos	Bandar Seri Begawan, Brunei
18:00 UTC+7	Nazirrudin 26'	Report		Stadium: Track & Field Sports Complex; Attendance: 450; Referee: Thoriq Alkatiri (Indonesia)

11 December Friendly	Thailand U-23	0–1	Laos	Pathum Thani, Thailand
17:30 UTC+7			Ketkeophomphone 29'	Stadium: Thammasat Stadium

14 December Friendly	Thailand U-23	5–0	Laos	Pathum Thani, Thailand
17:30 UTC+7	Anan 7'; Purachet 11'; Settasit 33'; Khemdee 75' (pen.); Phanthamit 84'			Stadium: Thammasat Stadium

21 December 2022 AFF Championship	Laos	0–6	Vietnam	Vientiane, Laos
19:30 UTC+7		Report	Nguyễn Tiến Linh 15'; Đỗ Hùng Dũng 43'; Hồ Tấn Tài 55'; Đoàn Văn Hậu 58'; Nguyễn Văn Toàn 82'; Vũ Văn Thanh 90+1'	Stadium: New Laos National Stadium; Attendance: 10,240; Referee: Hiroki Kasahara (Japan)

24 December 2022 AFF Championship	Malaysia	5–0	Laos	Kuala Lumpur, Malaysia
20:30 UTC+8	Agüero 29'; Faisal 65', 68'; Haqimi 77'; Wilkin 87'	Report		Stadium: Bukit Jalil Stadium; Attendance: 29,961; Referee: Majed Al Shamrani (Saudi Arabia)

27 December 2022 AFF Championship	Laos	0–2	Singapore	Vientiane, Laos
17:00 UTC+7		Report	Irfan 32'; Shawal 90+4'	Stadium: New Laos National Stadium; Attendance: 1,087; Referee: Omar Al-Yaqoubi (Oman)

30 December 2022 AFF Championship	Myanmar	2–2	Laos	Yangon, Myanmar
16:30 UTC+6	Kyaw Min Oo 15'; Maung Maung Lwin 90+6'	Report	Soukaphone 12'; Ekkamai 46'	Stadium: Thuwunna Stadium; Attendance: 4,100; Referee: Aziz Asimov (Uzbekistan)

=== 2023 ===
22 March 2023 Prime Minister's Three Nations Cup	Nepal	2–0	Laos	Kathmandu, Nepal
18:00 UTC+5:45	Tamang 29'; Nawayug 54'	Report		Stadium: Dasharath Rangasala Stadium; Attendance: 5,170; Referee: Sinan Hussain (Maldives)

25 March 2023 Prime Minister's Three Nations Cup	Laos	2–1	Bhutan	Kathmandu, Nepal
18:00 UTC+5:45	Bounkong 3', 72'	Report	Gyeltshen 34'	Stadium: Dasharath Rangasala Stadium; Attendance: 500; Referee: Javiz Mohamed (Maldives)

31 March 2023 Prime Minister's Three Nations Cup	Nepal	2–1	Laos	Kathmandu, Nepal
17:30 UTC+5:45	Ayush 24'; Dangi 88'	Report	Sangvilay 17'	Stadium: Dasharath Rangasala Stadium; Referee: Sinan Hussain (Maldives)

30 September Friendly	Thailand U-20	1–1	Laos	Buriram, Thailand
17:30 UTC+7	Thanakrit 38'		Kydavone 37'	Stadium: Chang Arena; Referee: Jirayu Lohapom Thailand

12 October 2026 FIFA World Cup qualification	Nepal	1–1	Laos	Kathmandu, Nepal
17:00 UTC+5:45	Bista 48'	Report	Bounkong 33'	Stadium: Dasharath Rangasala; Attendance: 11,235; Referee: Nivon Robesh Gamini (Sri Lanka)

17 October 2026 FIFA World Cup qualification	Laos	0–1 (1–2 agg.)	Nepal	Vientiane, Laos
19:00 UTC+7		Report	Dangi 53'	Stadium: New Laos National Stadium; Attendance: 9,772; Referee: Ali Reda (Lebanon)

=== 2024 ===
14 November Friendly	Laos	1–3	Malaysia	Bangkok, Thailand
19:30 UTC+7	Souvanny 34'	Report	Harith 6'; Wilkin 64' (pen.); Agüero 83' (pen.)	Stadium: PAT Stadium; Referee: Songkran Bunmeekiart (Thailand)

17 November Friendly	Thailand	1–1	Laos	Pathum Thani, Thailand
19:30 UTC+7	Seksan 60'	Report	Bounkong 69'	Stadium: Thammasat Stadium; Attendance: 4,637; Referee: Tam Ping Wun (Hong Kong)

9 December 2024 ASEAN Championship	Laos	1–4	Vietnam	Vientiane, Laos
20:00 UTC+7	Bounkong 90+5' (pen.)	Report	Nguyễn Hai Long 58'; Nguyễn Tiến Linh 63'; Nguyễn Văn Toàn 69'; Nguyễn Văn Vĩ 82'	Stadium: New Laos National Stadium; Attendance: 10,685; Referee: Ko Hyung-jin (South Korea)

12 December 2024 ASEAN Championship	Indonesia	3–3	Laos	Surakarta, Indonesia
20:00 UTC+7	Kadek 12'; Ferarri 18', 72'	Report	Panyavong 9'; Phommathep 13'; Phanthavong 77'	Stadium: Manahan Stadium; Attendance: 14,455; Referee: Hiroki Kasahara (Japan)

15 December 2024 ASEAN Championship	Laos	1–1	Philippines	Vientiane, Laos
17:30 UTC+7	Baldisimo 34' (o.g.)	Report	Reyes 77'	Stadium: New Laos National Stadium; Attendance: 6,389; Referee: Ryo Tanimoto (Japan)

18 December 2024 ASEAN Championship	Myanmar	3–2	Laos	Yangon, Myanmar
17:00 UTC+6:30	Lwin Moe Aung 32'; Win Naing Tun 87', 90+3'	Report	Kydavone 77'; Chony 81'	Stadium: Thuwunna Stadium; Attendance: 8,150; Referee: Hiroyuki Kimura (Japan)

=== 2025 ===
20 March Friendly	Laos	1–2	Sri Lanka	Vientiane, Laos
19:45 UTC+7	Kydavone 89'	Report	Dekker 18'; Rajamohan 55'	Stadium: New Laos National Stadium; Attendance: 3,955; Referee: Songkran Bunmeekiart (Thailand)

25 March 2027 AFC Asian Cup qualification	Vietnam	5–0	Laos	Bình Dương, Vietnam
19:30 UTC+7	Ngọc Quang 11'; Văn Vĩ 44', 50'; Hai Long 63'; Quang Hải 84'	Report (AFC)		Stadium: Gò Đậu Stadium; Attendance: 11,068; Referee: Yahya Ali Al-Mulla (United Arab Emirates)

10 June 2027 AFC Asian Cup qualification	Laos	2–1	Nepal	Vientiane, Laos
19:00 UTC+7	Damoth 13'; Peter 49'	Report (AFC)	Dangi 73' (pen.)	Stadium: New Laos National Stadium; Attendance: 5,123; Referee: Nivon Robesh (Sri Lanka)

9 October 2027 AFC Asian Cup qualification	Laos	0–3	Malaysia	Vientiane, Laos
19:00 UTC+7		Report Report (AFC)	Arif 53'; Cools 69'; Faisal 90+7'	Stadium: New Laos National Stadium; Attendance: 5,289; Referee: Wiwat Jumpao-on (Thailand)

14 October 2027 AFC Asian Cup qualification	Malaysia	5–1	Laos	Kuala Lumpur, Malaysia
21:00 UTC+8	Faisal 59'; Morales 65', 70'; Khammanh 79' (o.g.); Josué 82'	Report; Report (AFC)	Chanthavixay 19'	Stadium: Bukit Jalil National Stadium; Attendance: 18,901; Referee: Ahmed Eisa Darwish (United Arab Emirates)

19 November 2027 AFC Asian Cup qualification	Laos	0–2	Vietnam	Vientiane, Laos
19:00 UTC+7		Report (AFC)	Nguyễn Xuân Son 67' (pen.); Phạm Tuấn Hải 90+2'	Stadium: New Laos National Stadium; Attendance: 16,250; Referee: Ali Reda (Lebanon)

=== 2026 ===
31 March 2027 AFC Asian Cup qualification	Nepal	0–1	Laos	Vientiane, Laos (Note: Stadiums in Nepal do not meet AFC requirements, Nepal will be required to play their home matches at a neutral venue.)
19:00 UTC+7		Report; Report (AFC)	Bounphachan 47'	Stadium: New Laos National Stadium; Attendance: 2,327; Referee: Ahmad A'Qashah (Singapore)

25 July 2026 ASEAN Championship	Laos	0–5	Thailand	Vientiane, Laos
20:00 UTC+7		Report	Teerasak 11'; Kakana 27', 59'; Yotsakorn 49'; Sarach 52'	Stadium: New Laos National Stadium; Attendance: 7,678; Referee: Choi Hyun-jai (South Korea)

28 July 2026 ASEAN Championship	Malaysia	4–0	Laos	Kuala Lumpur, Malaysia
21:00 UTC+8	Paulo Josué 45'; Endrick 57'; Viengxay 66' (o.g.); Wan Kuzain 84'	Report		Stadium: Kuala Lumpur Stadium; Attendance: 10,044; Referee: Mohammed Sami Al-Ismail (Saudi Arabia)

1 August 2026 ASEAN Championship	Laos	1–4	Philippines	Vientiane, Laos
17:00 UTC+7	Damoth 7'	Report	Lucero 47'; Viengxay 52' (o.g.); Gayoso 60' (pen.); Sato 88'	Stadium: New Laos National Stadium; Attendance: 1,188; Referee: Kim Hee-gon (South Korea)

4 August 2026 ASEAN Championship	Myanmar	7–2	Laos	Yangon, Myanmar
16:30 UTC+6:30	Lwin Moe Aung 2'; Win Naing Tun 20', 41', 83'; Maung Maung Lwin 45+6' (pen.); Than Paing 52'; Hein Htet Aung 81'	Report	Bounchay 17'; Phoutthavong 23'	Stadium: Thuwunna Stadium; Referee: Alimardon Bananarov (Kyrgyzstan)

24 September 2026 FIFA ASEAN Cup	Laos	3–1	Brunei	Kowloon, Hong Kong
17:00 UTC+8	Bounkong 4' (pen.); Singsavang 24'; Chernvanglien 67'	Report	Haziq N. 45+1'	Stadium: Mong Kok Stadium; Referee: Wong Wai Lun (Hong Kong)

27 September 2026 FIFA ASEAN Cup	Hong Kong	4–0	Laos	Kowloon, Hong Kong
15:00 UTC+8	Sun Ming Him 12'; Camargo 33'; Dudu 55'; Orr 90+1' (pen.)	Report		Stadium: Kai Tak Stadium; Attendance: 18,873; Referee: Sanzhar Zhakypbekov (Kyrgyzstan)

== Head-to-head record ==
Key

Positive balance
Neutral balance
Negative balance

Laos national football team head-to-head records (2020–present)
Opponent	Pld	W	D	L	GF	GA	GD	Pts	Confederation
Bhutan	1	1	0	0	2	1	+1	3	AFC
Brunei	3	2	0	1	6	4	+2	6	AFC
Cambodia	1	0	0	1	0	3	–3	0	AFC
Hong Kong	1	0	0	1	0	4	–4	0	AFC
Indonesia	2	0	1	1	4	8	–4	1	AFC
Malaysia	6	0	0	6	2	24	–22	0	AFC
Maldives	1	0	0	1	1	3	–2	0	AFC
Mongolia	1	1	0	0	1	0	+1	3	AFC
Myanmar	3	0	1	2	6	12	–6	1	AFC
Nepal	6	2	1	3	5	7	–2	7	AFC
Philippines	2	0	1	1	2	5	–3	1	AFC
Singapore	1	0	0	1	0	2	–2	0	AFC
Sri Lanka	1	0	0	1	1	2	–1	0	AFC
Thailand	2	0	1	1	1	6	–5	1	AFC
Vietnam	5	0	0	5	1	19	–18	0	AFC
Total	36	6	5	25	32	100	–68	23	
