= Damoth Thongkhamsavath =

Laotian association football player

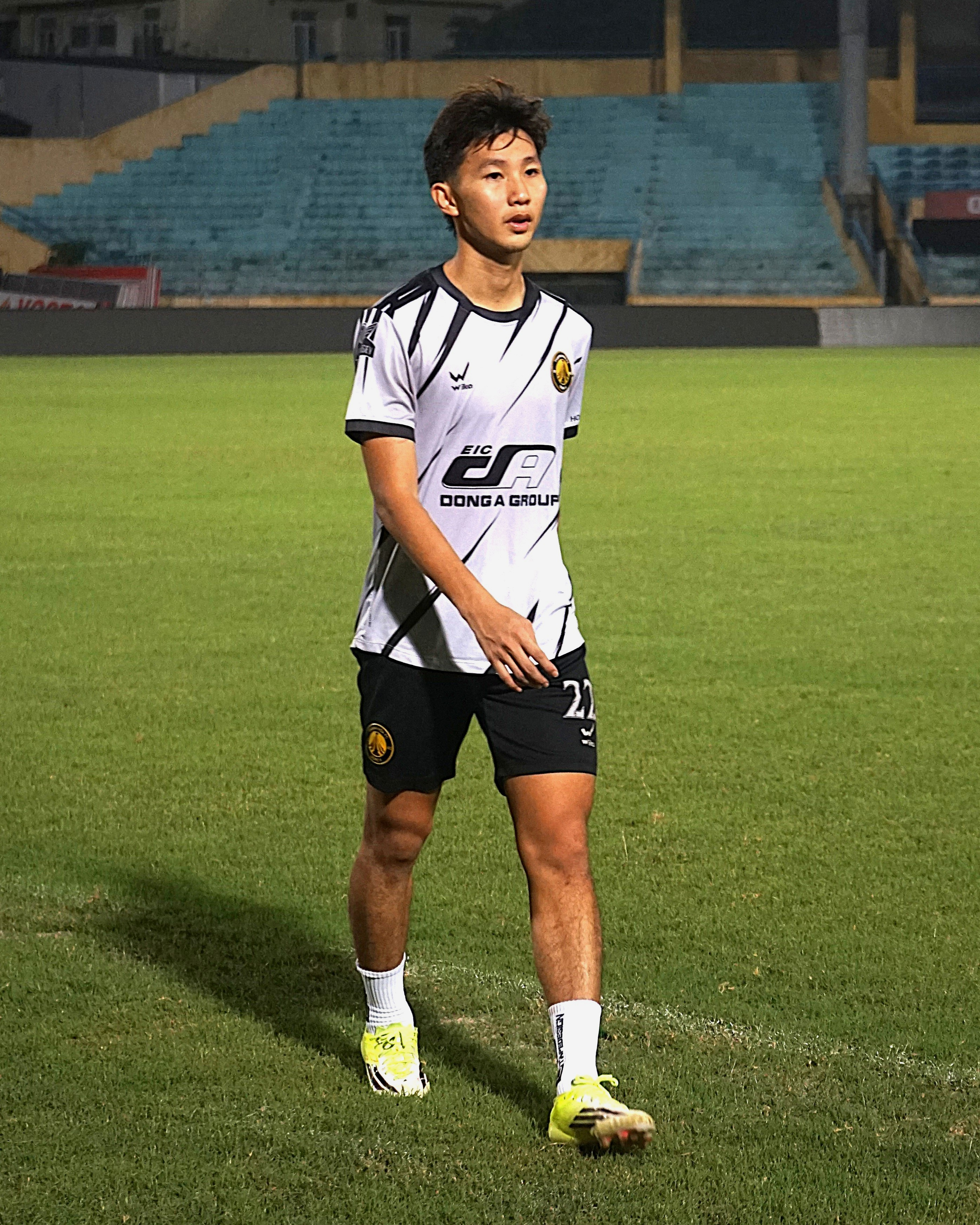
- Damoth in 2026

Personal information
- Date of birth: 13 April 2004 (age 22)
- Place of birth: Champasak, Laos
- Height: 1.72 m (5 ft 8 in)
- Position: Midfielder

Team information
- Current team: Thanh Hoa
- Number: 22

Senior career*
Years	Team	Apps	(Gls)
2022	Champasak United	18	(4)
2023–2025	Ezra	25	(10)
2025–	Thanh Hoa	31	(5)

International career^{‡}
2019	Laos U19	9	(2)
2021–2025	Laos U23	5	(1)
2022–	Laos	22	(2)
- * Club domestic league appearances and goals as of 20 November 2026 ‡ National team caps and goals as of 27 September 2026

Damoth Thongkhamsavath (Lao: ດາໝົດ ທອງຄຳສະຫວັດ; born 13 April 2004) is a Laotian professional footballer who plays as a midfielder for V.League 1 club Thanh Hoa and the Laos national team.

== Club career ==
Damoth joined Ezra in 2023. He contributed to the team first ever Lao League 1 title in 2024–25 season and was therefore named as "Player of the season".

On 12 March 2025, Damoth moved to Vietnam, signing for V.League 1 side Đông Á Thanh Hóa. He became the first Lao footballer to play in Vietnam.

== International career ==
Damoth featured in Laos national team squad for the 2024 ASEAN Championship.

Damoth scored his first international goal on 10 June 2025 against Nepal during the 2027 AFC Asian Cup qualification at the New Laos National Stadium.

== Personal life ==
Born in Laos, Damoth is of Vietnamese descent. Both of his maternal grandparents are from Quảng Bình and has long settled in Champasak. For this reason, Damoth is counted as an unnaturalized Vietnamese player instead of a regular foreign player.

== Career statistics ==
=== Club ===
As of match played 20 November 2026

Appearances and goals by club, season and competition
Club	Season	League			National cup (Note: Includes Prime Minister's Cup, Vietnamese Cup)		Continental		Other		Total	
Club	Season	Division	Apps	Goals	Apps	Goals	Apps	Goals	Apps	Goals	Apps	Goals
Champasak United	2022	Lao League 1	18	4	1	0	—		—		19	4
Ezra	2023	Lao League 1	12	2	0	0	—		—		12	2
Ezra	2024–25	Lao League 1	13	8	6	3	—		—		19	11
Ezra	Total		25	10	6	3	—		—		31	13
Thanh Hoa	2024–25	V.League 1	7	0	0	0	—		—		7	0
Thanh Hoa	2025–26	V.League 1	18	3	1	0	—		—		19	3
Thanh Hoa	2026–27	V.League 1	6	2	1	0	—		—		7	2
Thanh Hoa	Total		31	5	2	0	0	0	0	0	33	5
Career total			74	19	9	3	0	0	0	0	83	22

=== International ===
As of 27 September 2026

National team	Year	Apps	Goals
Laos	2022	1	0
Laos	2023	4	0
Laos	2024	6	0
Laos	2025	6	1
Laos	2026	5	1
Total		22	2

Scores and results list Laos's goal tally first, score column indicates score after each Damoth goal.

List of international goals scored by Damoth Thongkhamsavath
No.	Date	Venue	Opponent	Score	Result	Competition
1	10 June 2025	New Laos National Stadium, Vientiane, Laos	Nepal	1–0	2–1	2027 AFC Asian Cup qualification
2	1 August 2026	New Laos National Stadium, Vientiane, Laos	Philippines	1–0	1–4	2026 ASEAN Championship

== Honours ==
Ezra

- Lao League 1: 2024–25
- Prime Minister's Cup: 2024–25

Individual

- Lao League 1 Player of the season: 2024–25
