= 2022 Lao League 1 =

Pepsi Lao League 1
- Season: 2022
- Dates: 12 March – 20 August 2022
- Champions: Young Elephants
- 2023-24 AFC Cup: Young Elephants
- Matches: 63
- Goals: 171 (2.71 per match)
- Top goalscorer: Keoviengphet Liththideth (15 goal)
- Biggest home win: Young Elephant 3–0 Viengchanh (19 March 2022); Master 7 4–1 Champasak (3 March 2022)
- Biggest away win: Ezra 0–5 Young Elephants (2 April 2022)
- Highest scoring: 5 goal difference Ezra 0–5 Young Elephants (2 April 2022); Master 7 4–1 Champasak (3 March 2022); Luang Prabang 2–3 Master 7 (19 March 2022)
- Longest winning run: 4 matches Young Elephants
- Longest winless run: 3 matches Viengchanh; Champasak; Ezra; Lao Army
- Longest losing run: 2 matches Champasak; Ezra
- Highest attendance: 8,500; Luang Prabang 0–1 Young Elephants (10 April 2022)

The 2022 Lao League 1, known as the 2022 Pepsi Lao League 1 for sponsorship reasons, is the 33rd season of the Lao League 1. Contested by 7 clubs, it operates on a system of promotion and relegation with the Lao League 2. The season started on 12 March 2022. It is played in triple round-robin format, with 21 total rounds. Due to the new policies and regulations implemented by the newly established Laos Football League Company, there will be only seven teams in the league.

FC Chanthabouly were the defending champions, having won their title in 2020 season. However, they did not send a team due to problems with the Lao National Football Federation.

== Team ==
A total of 7 teams participated in the 2022 Lao League 1 season.

Locations of the 2022 Lao Premier League teams

=== Stadium ===
Note: Table lists in alphabetical order.

Team	Location	Stadium	Capacity
Champasak	Champasak Province	Champasak Stadium	12,000
Ezra	Vientiane	New Laos National Stadium	25,000
Lao Army	Vientiane	Army Stadium KM5	1,000
Luang Prabang	Luang Prabang Province	Luang Prabang Stadium	20,000
Master 7 FC	Vientiane	New Laos National Stadium	25,000
Viengchanh	Vientiane Province	New Laos National Stadium	25,000
Young Elephants	Vientiane	New Laos National Stadium	25,000

=== Withdrew ===
A total of 7 teams participated in the 2022 Lao League season, 1 promoted from the previous season of Lao League 2. 1 teams withdrew from the league, including defending champions, Chanthabouly after winning the 2021 season due to Laos match fixing scandal.

- Chanthabuly

== Personnel, kit and sponsoring ==
Note: Flags indicate national team as has been defined under FIFA eligibility rules. Players may hold more than one non-FIFA nationality.

Team	Manager	Captain	Kit manufacturer	Shirt sponsor
Champasak	(Laos) Khamla Pinkeo	(Laos) Nalongsit Chanthalanhsy	(Laos) EVO	HAL Logistics ຮຸ່ງອາລຸນ ຂົນສົ່ງ
Ezra	(Laos) Soukphavanh Phaivanh	(Laos) Phathana Phommathep	(Japan) Mizuno	Coca-Cola
Lao Army	(Laos) Viengsavanh Sayyaboun	(Laos) Phouthone Innalay	(Laos) Myway Sportwear	Myway Sports
Luang Prabang	(Laos) Khamsai Chanthavong	(Laos) Bounmy Jittaphone	(Laos) Cava	BCEL Bank & Luang Prabang in group & Luang Prabang Hotel
Master 7	(Laos) Chandalaphone Liepvixai	(Laos) Keoviengphet Liththideth	(Laos) NOAH	ISUZU LAO SERVICES
Viengchanh	(Laos) Phoutpasong Sengdalavong	(Laos) Keo Phimmasone	(Laos) EVO	Niksan mining development group & Lao star
Young Elephants	(Singapore) Satyasagara	(Laos) Bounphachan Bounkong	(Thailand) FBT	T-Plus & Foodpanda

=== Managerial changes ===
Team	Outgoing manager	Manner of departure	Date of vacancy	Week	Table	Incoming manager
Luang Prabang	(Laos) Kaisone Xayavong	Resigned	15 May 2022	6	6	(Laos) Khamsai Chanthavong
Ezra	(South Korea) Na Byung Soo	Resigned	5 Jun 2022	6	6	(Laos) Soukphavanh Phaivanh

== Foreign players ==
The number of foreign players is restricted to four per team. A team can use four foreign players on the field in each game, including at least one player from the AFC region.

Players name in bold indicates the player is registered during the mid-season transfer window.

Club	Player 1	Player 2	Player 3	Asian Player	Former Players
Champasak					
Ezra	(Guam) Takumi Ito	(Netherlands) Melvin Platje		(Japan) Takuya Watanabe	
Lao Army					
Luang Prabang	(Liberia) Emmanuel Jugbe Doe			(Japan) Rei Ishikawa	
Master 7	(Mali) Souleymane Coulibaly			(Japan) Yukihiro Ayukawa	(Nigeria) Murphy Ebedi (Sierra Leone) Abu Kanu (Brazil) Rafinha
Viengchanh	(Cameroon) Koffi Ben David	(Nigeria) Murphy Ebedi	(Sierra Leone) Abu Kanu		
Young Elephants	(Brazil) Lucas Paulista	(Japan) Shori Murata	(Myanmar) Aee Soe	(Japan) Ryota Yanagisono	(Japan) Masaya Tobari (Japan) Satoshi Iwahashi

== League table ==
Pos	Team	Pld	W	D	L	GF	GA	GD	Pts	Qualification or relegation
1	Young Elephants (C)	18	13	5	0	41	9	+32	44	2023-24 AFC Cup play-off round
2	Master 7	18	9	6	3	31	17	+14	33	
3	Ezra	18	8	5	5	25	21	+4	29	
4	Luang Prabang	18	5	4	9	21	25	−4	19	
5	Lao Army	18	5	4	9	15	21	−6	19	
6	Viengchanh	18	3	6	9	17	44	−27	15	
7	Champasak	18	3	4	11	21	34	−13	13	

Updated to match(es) played on 20 August 2022. Source: FIFA Soccerway Lao League
Rules for classification: 1) Points; 2) Goal difference; 3) Goals scored
(C) Champions

== Awards ==
- The best player:
  - Kydavone Souvanny (Young Elephants)
- The scoring:
  - Keoviengphet Liththideth (Master 7)
- The best goalkeeper:
  - Outthilath Nammakhoth (Young Elephants)

== Top scorers ==
Rank	Player	Club	Goals
1	(Laos) Keoviengphet Liththideth	Master 7	15
2	(Brazil) Rafinha	Master 7	10
3	(Laos) Sinnakone Koumanykham	Luang Prabang	9
4	(Laos) Bounphachan Bounkong	Young Elephants	8
4	(Laos) Peter Phanthavong	Ezra	8
4	(Brazil) Lucas Paulista	Young Elephants	8
4	(Laos) Soukphachan Luangthala	Champasak	8
8	(Laos) Anousone Xaypanya	Ezra	6
9	(Laos) Chony Wenpaserth	Ezra	5
9	(Laos) Phouvieng Phoumsavath	Viengchanh	5

- 1 own goal

(Laos) Kittisak Phomvongsa (against Master 7 FC)

- 1 own goal

(Laos) Bounmy Jittaphon (against Viengchanh FC)

== See also ==
- 2022 Lao League 2
- 2022 LFF Lao Cup
- 2022 LFF National Championship
