= Phoutthavong Sangvilay =

Laotian association football player

Personal information
- Date of birth: 16 October 2004 (age 22)
- Place of birth: Batiengchaleunsouk, Champasak, Laos
- Height: 1.79 m (5 ft 10 in)
- Position: Left-back

Team information
- Current team: Ezra
- Number: 2

Youth career
- 2015–2020: Ezra

Senior career*
Years	Team	Apps	(Gls)
2020–	Ezra	59	(5)
2025–2026	→ BG Pathum United (loan)	4	(0)

International career^{‡}
2019	Laos U16	9	(2)
2019–2022	Laos U20	13	(2)
2021–2025	Laos U23	22	(0)
2021–	Laos	30	(3)
- * Club domestic league appearances and goals as of 7 June 2026 ‡ National team caps and goals as of 4 August 2026

Phoutthavong Sangvilay (Lao: ພຸດທະວົງ ສັງວິໄລ; born 16 October 2004) is a Laotian professional footballer who plays as a left-back for Lao League 1 club Ezra and the Laos national team.

== Club career ==
Phoutthavong joined Ezra youth academy in 2015. In the 2024–25 season, he took part in the team's first ever Lao League 1 title.

In June 2025, Phoutthavong joined Thai League 1 club BG Pathum United on loan. He left the team after one season, appearing in 8 matches and had 2 assists.

== International career ==
Phoutthavong made his debut for Laos national team in 2021, during the 2020 AFF Championship.

== Career statistics ==
=== Club ===
As of match played 19 September 2026

Appearances and goals by club, season and competition
Club	Season	League			National cup (Note: Includes Prime Minister's Cup, Thai FA Cup)		Continental		Other		Total	
Club	Season	Division	Apps	Goals	Apps	Goals	Apps	Goals	Apps	Goals	Apps	Goals
Ezra	2020	Lao League 1	12	0	3	0	—		—		15	0
Ezra	2021	Lao League 1	2	0	—		—		—		2	0
Ezra	2022	Lao League 1	17	1	2	0	—		—		19	1
Ezra	2023	Lao League 1	14	4	—		—		—		14	4
Ezra	2024–25	Lao League 1	14	0	6	3	—		—		20	3
Ezra	2026–27	Lao League 1	0	0	0	0	1 (Note: Appearances in AFC Challenge League)	1	2 (Note: Appearances in ASEAN Club Championship)	0	3	1
Ezra	Total		59	5	11	3	1	1	2	0	73	9
BG Pathum United (loan)	2025–26	Thai League 1	4	0	1	0	2 (Note: Appearances in AFC Champions League Two)	0	1	0	8	0
Career total			63	5	12	3	3	1	3	0	81	9

=== International ===
As of 4 August 2026

National team	Year	Apps	Goals
Laos	2021	2	0
Laos	2022	8	1
Laos	2023	5	1
Laos	2024	5	0
Laos	2025	6	0
Laos	2026	4	1
Total		30	3

Scores and results list Laos's goal tally first, score column indicates score after each Sangvilay goal.

List of international goals scored by Phoutthavong Sangvilay
No.	Date	Venue	Opponent	Score	Result	Competition
1	27 March 2022	New Laos National Stadium, Vientiane, Laos	Brunei	1–0	3–2	Friendly
2	31 March 2023	Dasharath Stadium, Kathmandu, Nepal	Nepal	1–0	1–2	2023 Prime Minister's Three Nations Cup
3	4 August 2026	Thuwunna Stadium, Yangon, Myanmar	Myanmar	2–2	7–2	2026 ASEAN Championship

== Honours ==
Ezra

- Lao League 1: 2024–25
- Prime Minister's Cup: 2024–25
