= 2022 AFF Championship Group B =

Group B of the 2022 AFF Championship took place from 21 December 2022 to 3 January 2023. It consisted of Vietnam, Malaysia, Singapore, Myanmar, and Laos.

Vietnam and Malaysia advanced to the semi-finals as the top two teams on the group. Vietnam topped the group with three victories and a draw. Malaysia would advance as runners-up, with three wins and a loss. Singapore finished third, while Myanmar and Laos finished fourth and fifth respectively, both with a single point.

== Teams ==
Draw position	Team	Appearance	Previous best performance	FIFA Ranking (October 2022)
B1	Vietnam	14th	Winners (2008, 2018)	96
B2	Malaysia	14th	Winners (2010)	146
B3	Singapore	14th	Winners (1998, 2004, 2007, 2012)	160
B4	Myanmar	14th	Fourth place / Semi-finalists (2004, 2016)	158
B5	Laos	13th	Group stage (All appearances)	187

== Standings ==
Pos	Team	Pld	W	D	L	GF	GA	GD	Pts	Qualification
1	Vietnam	4	3	1	0	12	0	+12	10	Advance to knockout stage
2	Malaysia	4	3	0	1	10	4	+6	9	Advance to knockout stage
3	Singapore	4	2	1	1	6	6	0	7	
4	Myanmar	4	0	1	3	4	9	−5	1	
5	Laos	4	0	1	3	2	15	−13	1	

Source: AFF

== Matches ==
=== Myanmar vs Malaysia ===
21 December 2022
16:30 UTC+6:30

Myanmar	0–1	Malaysia
	Report (AFFMEC); Report (AFF)	Faisal 52'

Thuwunna Stadium, Yangon
Attendance: 4,500
Referee: Ahmed Faisal Al Ali (Jordan)

Myanmar	Malaysia

GK	18	Kyaw Zin Phyo	(yellow card) 40'
RB	12	Kyaw Zin Lwin		(substituted off) 61'
CB	3	Ye Min Thu
CB	17	Thiha Htet Aung	(yellow card) 60'
LB	5	Nanda Kyaw		(substituted off) 82'
DM	6	Kyaw Min Oo	(yellow card) 80'
RM	11	Maung Maung Lwin (c)		(substituted off) 41'
CM	16	Yan Naing Oo	(yellow card) 24'	(substituted off) 46'
CM	7	Lwin Moe Aung
LM	8	Hein Htet Aung
CF	9	Aung Kaung Mann	(yellow card) 90+3'	(substituted off) 61'
Substitutions:
FW	19	Ye Yint Aung		(substituted on) 41'
MF	21	Myat Kaung Khant		(substituted on) 46'
DF	2	Hein Phyo Win		(substituted on) 61'
FW	10	Win Naing Tun	(yellow card) 84'	(substituted on) 61'
DF	4	David Htan		(substituted on) 82'
Manager:
(Germany) Antoine Hey

GK	16	Syihan Hazmi
CB	5	Sharul Nazeem
CB	15	Khuzaimi Piee		(substituted off) 45+3'
CB	6	Dominic Tan
RM	2	Azam Azmi
CM	18	Brendan Gan
CM	8	Stuart Wilkin
LM	4	V. Ruventhiran		(substituted off) 87'
RF	11	Safawi Rasid (c)	(yellow card) 90+5'	(substituted off) 73'
CF	9	Darren Lok		(substituted off) 46'
LF	7	Faisal Halim		(substituted off) 88'
Substitutions:
DF	12	Fazly Mazlan		(substituted on) 45+3'
MF	10	Lee Tuck		(substituted on) 46'
FW	19	Ezequiel Agüero	(yellow card) 90+3'	(substituted on) 73'
MF	17	David Rowley		(substituted on) 87'
MF	21	Aliff Haiqal		(substituted on) 88'
Manager:
(South Korea) Kim Pan-gon

Man of the Match:
Syihan Hazmi (Malaysia)

Assistant referees:
Ahmad Mansour Samara Muhsen (Jordan)
Hamza Adel Abu Obaid (Jordan)
Fourth official:
Sivakorn Pu-udom (Thailand)

=== Laos vs Vietnam ===
21 December 2022
19:30 UTC+7

Laos	0–6	Vietnam
	Report (AFFMEC); Report (AFF)	Nguyễn Tiến Linh 15'; Đỗ Hùng Dũng 43'; Hồ Tấn Tài 55'; Đoàn Văn Hậu 58'; Nguyễn Văn Toàn 82'; Vũ Văn Thanh 90+1'

New Laos National Stadium, Vientiane
Attendance: 10,240
Referee: Hiroki Kasahara (Japan)

Laos	Vietnam

GK	12	Keo-Oudone Souvannasangso
RB	23	At Viengkham		(substituted off) 67'
CB	4	Anantaza Siphongphan
CB	19	Nalongsit Chanthalangsy
LB	2	Phoutthavong Sangvilay
CM	17	Soukaphone Vongchiengkham (c)
CM	6	Chanthavixay Khounthoumphone		(substituted off) 78'
RW	11	Soukphachan Lueanthala		(substituted off) 46'
AM	7	Anousone Xaypanya		(substituted off) 46'
LW	15	Chony Waenpaseuth
CF	10	Billy Ketkeophomphone	(yellow card) 12'	(substituted off) 46'
Substitutions:
MF	21	Phithack Kongmathilath		(substituted on) 46'
FW	20	Ekkamai Ratxachak		(substituted on) 46'
MF	8	Manolom Phetphakdy		(substituted on) 46'
DF	13	Inthachak Sisouphan		(substituted on) 67'
FW	5	Phathana Phommathep		(substituted on) 78'
Manager:
(Germany) Michael Weiß

GK	23	Đặng Văn Lâm
CB	2	Đỗ Duy Mạnh
CB	3	Quế Ngọc Hải
CB	16	Nguyễn Thành Chung
RM	13	Hồ Tấn Tài
CM	8	Đỗ Hùng Dũng (c)
CM	14	Nguyễn Hoàng Đức	(substituted off) 65'
LM	5	Đoàn Văn Hậu	(substituted off) 65'
RF	19	Nguyễn Quang Hải	(substituted off) 34'
CF	22	Nguyễn Tiến Linh	(substituted off) 77'
LF	20	Phan Văn Đức	(substituted off) 65'
Substitutions:
FW	10	Nguyễn Văn Quyết	(substituted on) 34'
FW	9	Nguyễn Văn Toàn	(substituted on) 65'
MF	11	Nguyễn Tuấn Anh	(substituted on) 65'
DF	17	Vũ Văn Thanh	(substituted on) 65'
FW	18	Phạm Tuấn Hải	(substituted on) 77'
Manager:
(South Korea) Park Hang-seo

Man of the Match:
Đỗ Hùng Dũng (Vietnam)

Assistant referees:
Yosuke Takabe (Japan)
Mohammad Faisal Ali (Brunei)
Fourth official:
Abdul Hakim Mohd Haidi (Brunei)

=== Singapore vs Myanmar ===
24 December 2022
18:00 UTC+8

Singapore	3–2	Myanmar
Ilhan 45'; Shah 49'; Shawal 74'	Report (AFFMEC); Report (AFF)	Maung Maung Lwin 34', 66'

Jalan Besar Stadium, Singapore
Attendance: 5,370
Referee: Kim Jong-hyeok (South Korea)

Singapore	Myanmar

GK	12	Zaiful Nizam
RB	11	Hafiz Nor		(substituted off) 46'
CB	14	Hariss Harun (c)	(yellow card) 84'
CB	8	Shahdan Sulaiman
LB	22	Christopher van Huizen		(substituted off) 67'
RM	20	Shawal Anuar
CM	6	Anumanthan Kumar		(substituted off) 53'
CM	15	Shah Shahiran
LM	2	Shakir Hamzah
SS	10	Faris Ramli		(substituted off) 46'
CF	19	Ilhan Fandi		(substituted off) 53'
Substitutions:
MF	3	Hami Syahin		(substituted on) 46'
DF	16	Ryhan Stewart		(substituted on) 46'
FW	9	Amy Recha		(substituted on) 53'
DF	21	Joshua Pereira		(substituted on) 53'
DF	4	Nazrul Nazari		(substituted on) 67'
Manager:
(Japan) Takayuki Nishigaya

GK	1	Myo Min Latt
RB	2	Hein Phyo Win		(substituted off) 54'
CB	3	Ye Min Thu
CB	17	Thiha Htet Aung
LB	5	Nanda Kyaw	(red card) 81'
CM	6	Kyaw Min Oo		(substituted off) 85'
CM	13	Lin Htet Soe		(substituted off) 61'
RW	11	Maung Maung Lwin (c)	(yellow card) 82'
AM	7	Lwin Moe Aung
LW	8	Hein Htet Aung
CF	9	Aung Kaung Mann		(substituted off) 54'
Substitutions:
FW	10	Win Naing Tun		(substituted on) 54'
DF	12	Kyaw Zin Lwin		(substituted on) 54'	(substituted off) 86'
MF	21	Myat Kaung Khant		(substituted on) 61'
FW	19	Ye Yint Aung		(substituted on) 85'
MF	20	Aung Naing Win		(substituted on) 86'
Manager:
(Germany) Antoine Hey

Man of the Match:
Shawal Anuar (Singapore)

Assistant referees:
Yoon Jae-yeol (South Korea)
Pattarapong Kijsathit (Thailand)
Fourth official:
Mongkolchai Pechsri (Thailand)

=== Malaysia vs Laos ===
24 December 2022
20:30 UTC+8

Malaysia	5–0	Laos
Agüero 29'; Faisal 65', 68'; Haqimi 77'; Wilkin 87'	Report (AFFMEC); Report (AFF)

Bukit Jalil National Stadium, Kuala Lumpur
Attendance: 29,961
Referee: Majed Al Shamrani (Saudi Arabia)

Malaysia	Laos

GK	23	Rahadiazli Rahalim
CB	3	Quentin Cheng
CB	5	Sharul Nazeem		(substituted off) 46'
CB	12	Fazly Mazlan
RM	20	Shamie Iszuan
CM	14	Mukhairi Ajmal		(substituted off) 46'
CM	17	David Rowley
LM	13	Hakim Hassan
RF	11	Safawi Rasid (c)		(substituted off) 86'
CF	19	Ezequiel Agüero		(substituted off) 82'
LF	7	Faisal Halim	(yellow card) 8'	(substituted off) 71'
Substitutions:
MF	10	Lee Tuck	(yellow card) 73'	(substituted on) 46'
MF	18	Brendan Gan		(substituted on) 46'
FW	22	Haqimi Azim		(substituted on) 71'
MF	8	Stuart Wilkin		(substituted on) 82'
MF	21	Aliff Haiqal		(substituted on) 86'
Manager:
(South Korea) Kim Pan-gon

GK	12	Keo-Oudone Souvannasangso
RB	17	Soukaphone Vongchiengkham (c)		(substituted off) 75'
CB	4	Anantaza Siphongphan	(yellow card) 13'
CB	19	Nalongsit Chanthalangsy
LB	23	At Viengkham		(substituted off) 37'
DM	21	Phithack Kongmathilath
RM	7	Anousone Xaypanya
CM	8	Manolom Phetphakdy		(substituted off) 37'
LM	2	Phoutthavong Sangvilay
SS	15	Chony Waenpaseuth		(substituted off) 63'
CF	20	Ekkamai Ratxachak		(substituted off) 62'
Substitutions:
FW	5	Phathana Phommathep		(substituted on) 37'
MF	6	Chanthavixay Khounthoumphone		(substituted on) 37'
FW	9	Kydavone Souvanny		(substituted on) 62'
FW	11	Soukphachan Lueanthala		(substituted on) 63'
MF	22	Phouvieng Phounsavath		(substituted on) 75'
Manager:
(Germany) Michael Weiß

Man of the Match:
Ezequiel Agüero (Malaysia)

Assistant referees:
Fahad Awaiedh Al Umri (Saudi Arabia)
Bambang Syamsudar (Indonesia)
Fourth official:
Songkran Bunmeekiart (Thailand)

=== Laos vs Singapore ===
27 December 2022
17:00 UTC+7

Laos	0–2	Singapore
	Report (AFFMEC); Report (AFF)	Irfan 32'; Shawal 90+4'

New Laos National Stadium, Vientiane
Attendance: 1,087
Referee: Omar Al-Yaqoubi (Oman)

Laos	Singapore

GK	12	Keo-Oudone Souvannasangso
RB	23	At Viengkham
CB	4	Anantaza Siphongphan
CB	19	Nalongsit Chanthalangsy
LB	2	Phoutthavong Sangvilay
CM	17	Soukaphone Vongchiengkham (c)		(substituted off) 67'
CM	21	Phithack Kongmathilath		(substituted off) 78'
RW	5	Phathana Phommathep
AM	7	Anousone Xaypanya	(yellow card) 22'	(substituted off) 36'
LM	15	Chony Waenpaseuth		(substituted off) 67'
CF	20	Ekkamai Ratxachak		(substituted off) 78'
Substitutions:
MF	6	Chanthavixay Khounthoumphone		(substituted on) 36'
FW	9	Kydavone Souvanny		(substituted on) 67'
MF	22	Phouvieng Phounsavath		(substituted on) 67'
FW	11	Soukphachan Lueanthala	(yellow card) 84'	(substituted on) 78'
DF	3	Phonsack Seesavath		(substituted on) 78'
Manager:
(Germany) Michael Weiß

GK	18	Hassan Sunny
RB	11	Hafiz Nor	(yellow card) 71'	(substituted off) 77'
CB	17	Irfan Fandi
CB	23	Zulfahmi Arifin
LB	4	Nazrul Nazari		(substituted off) 77'
DM	14	Hariss Harun (c)
DM	8	Shahdan Sulaiman	(yellow card) 22'
CM	21	Joshua Pereira
RF	7	Song Ui-young		(substituted off) 56'
CF	19	Ilhan Fandi	(yellow card) 31'	(substituted off) 61'
LF	10	Faris Ramli		(substituted off) 61'
Substitutes:
FW	9	Amy Recha		(substituted on) 56'
FW	20	Shawal Anuar		(substituted on) 61'
MF	15	Shah Shahiran		(substituted on) 61'
DF	16	Ryhan Stewart		(substituted on) 77'
DF	22	Christopher van Huizen		(substituted on) 77'
Manager:
(Japan) Takayuki Nishigaya

Man of the Match:
Irfan Fandi (Singapore)

Assistant referees:
Hamed Talib Al Ghafri (Oman)
Nophuan Apichit (Thailand)
Fourth official:
Chy Samdy (Cambodia)

=== Vietnam vs Malaysia ===
27 December 2022
19:30 UTC+7

Vietnam	3–0	Malaysia
Nguyễn Tiến Linh 28'; Quế Ngọc Hải 64' (pen.); Nguyễn Hoàng Đức 83'	Report (AFFMEC); Report (AFF)

Mỹ Đình National Stadium, Hanoi
Attendance: 17,545
Referee: Ryuji Sato (Japan)

Vietnam	Malaysia

GK	23	Đặng Văn Lâm
CB	2	Đỗ Duy Mạnh
CB	3	Quế Ngọc Hải
CB	16	Nguyễn Thành Chung		(substituted off) 46'
RM	13	Hồ Tấn Tài
CM	8	Đỗ Hùng Dũng (c)		(substituted off) 89'
CM	14	Nguyễn Hoàng Đức	(yellow card) 69'	(substituted off) 85'
LM	5	Đoàn Văn Hậu
RF	9	Nguyễn Văn Toàn	(yellow card) 13' (yellow-red card) 32'
CF	22	Nguyễn Tiến Linh		(substituted off) 80'
LF	20	Phan Văn Đức		(substituted off) 80'
Substitutes:
DF	4	Bùi Tiến Dũng		(substituted on) 46'
MF	19	Nguyễn Quang Hải		(substituted on) 80'
FW	18	Phạm Tuấn Hải		(substituted on) 80'
MF	11	Nguyễn Tuấn Anh		(substituted on) 85'
DF	7	Nguyễn Phong Hồng Duy		(substituted on) 89'
Manager:
(South Korea) Park Hang-seo

GK	16	Syihan Hazmi
RB	2	Azam Azmi	(red card) 62'
CB	5	Sharul Nazeem		(substituted off) 80'
CB	6	Dominic Tan	(yellow card) 42'	(substituted off) 68'
LB	4	V. Ruventhiran		(substituted off) 46'
CM	18	Brendan Gan
CM	8	Stuart Wilkin
CM	14	Mukhairi Ajmal	(yellow card) 35'	(substituted off) 58'
RF	10	Lee Tuck
CF	9	Darren Lok		(substituted off) 81'
LF	7	Faisal Halim (c)
Substitutes:
FW	13	Hakim Hassan		(substituted on) 46'
FW	11	Safawi Rasid		(substituted on) 58'
FW	20	Shamie Iszuan		(substituted on) 68'
DF	12	Fazly Mazlan		(substituted on) 80'
FW	19	Ezequiel Agüero		(substituted on) 81'
Manager:
(South Korea) Kim Pan-gon

Man of the Match:
Đặng Văn Lâm (Vietnam)

Assistant referees:
Jun Mihara (Japan)
Kota Watanabe (Japan)
Fourth official:
Clifford Daypuyat (Philippines)

=== Myanmar vs Laos ===
30 December 2022
16:30 UTC+6:30

Myanmar	2–2	Laos
Kyaw Min Oo 15'; Maung Maung Lwin 90+6'	Report (AFFMEC); Report (AFF)	Soukaphone 12'; Ekkamai 46'

Thuwunna Stadium, Yangon
Attendance: 4,100
Referee: Aziz Asimov (Uzbekistan)

Myanmar	Laos

GK	23	Tun Nanda Oo
RB	4	David Htan		(substituted off) 57'
CB	3	Ye Min Thu
CB	22	Hein Zeyar Lin
LB	12	Kyaw Zin Lwin		(substituted off) 80'
CM	6	Kyaw Min Oo
CM	21	Myat Kaung Khant		(substituted off) 57'
RW	11	Maung Maung Lwin (c)	(yellow card) 30'
AM	7	Lwin Moe Aung
LW	8	Hein Htet Aung
CF	9	Aung Kaung Mann		(substituted off) 64'
Substitutions:
DF	2	Hein Phyo Win		(substituted on) 57'
MF	13	Lin Htet Soe		(substituted on) 57'
FW	19	Ye Yint Aung		(substituted on) 64'
MF	20	Aung Naing Win	(yellow card) 90+8'	(substituted on) 80'
Manager:
(Germany) Antoine Hey

GK	18	Xaysavath Souvanhansok
RB	23	At Viengkham		(substituted off) 46'
CB	4	Anantaza Siphongphan	(yellow card) 82'
CB	19	Nalongsit Chanthalangsy
LB	2	Phoutthavong Sangvilay
CM	17	Soukaphone Vongchiengkham (c)		(substituted off) 46'
CM	6	Chanthavixay Khounthoumphone
RW	5	Phathana Phommathep	(yellow card) 45'
AM	21	Phithack Kongmathilath		(substituted off) 77'
LW	15	Chony Waenpaseuth		(substituted off) 68'
CF	20	Ekkamai Ratxachak		(substituted off) 83'
Substitutions:
FW	7	Anousone Xaypanya		(substituted on) 46'
FW	11	Soukphachan Lueanthala		(substituted on) 46'
FW	9	Kydavone Souvanny		(substituted on) 68'
MF	22	Phouvieng Phounsavath		(substituted on) 77'
FW	10	Billy Ketkeophomphone	(yellow card) 90+5'	(substituted on) 83'
Manager:
(Germany) Michael Weiß

Man of the Match:
Maung Maung Lwin (Myanmar)

Assistant referees:
Timur Gaynullin (Uzbekistan)
Tanate Chuchuen (Thailand)
Fourth official:
Warintorn Sassadee (Thailand)

=== Singapore vs Vietnam ===
30 December 2022
20:30 UTC+8

Singapore	0–0	Vietnam
	Report (AFFMEC); Report (AFF)

Jalan Besar Stadium, Singapore
Attendance: 5,434
Referee: Hiroki Kasahara (Japan)

Singapore	Vietnam

GK	18	Hassan Sunny
CB	14	Hariss Harun (c)
CB	17	Irfan Fandi
CB	8	Shahdan Sulaiman
RM	22	Christopher van Huizen		(substituted off) 67'
CM	6	Anumanthan Kumar	(yellow card) 5'	(substituted off) 67'
CM	15	Shah Shahiran		(substituted off) 90'
LM	2	Shakir Hamzah
RF	16	Ryhan Stewart
CF	19	Ilhan Fandi		(substituted off) 46'
LF	10	Faris Ramli		(substituted off) 46'
Substitutions:
MF	7	Song Ui-young		(substituted on) 46'
FW	20	Shawal Anuar		(substituted on) 46'
DF	4	Nazrul Nazari		(substituted on) 67'
MF	23	Zulfahmi Arifin	(yellow card) 83'	(substituted on) 67'
MF	3	Hami Syahin		(substituted on) 90'
Manager:
(Japan) Takayuki Nishigaya

GK	23	Đặng Văn Lâm
CB	6	Nguyễn Thanh Bình
CB	3	Quế Ngọc Hải
CB	4	Bùi Tiến Dũng
RM	17	Vũ Văn Thanh	(yellow card) 79'	(substituted off) 81'
CM	11	Nguyễn Tuấn Anh		(substituted off) 58'
CM	8	Đỗ Hùng Dũng (c)		(substituted off) 46'
LM	7	Nguyễn Phong Hồng Duy
AM	15	Châu Ngọc Quang		(substituted off) 46'
CF	18	Phạm Tuấn Hải		(substituted off) 58'
CF	10	Nguyễn Văn Quyết
Substitutions:
MF	19	Nguyễn Quang Hải		(substituted on) 46'
FW	20	Phan Văn Đức		(substituted on) 46'
MF	14	Nguyễn Hoàng Đức		(substituted on) 58'
FW	22	Nguyễn Tiến Linh		(substituted on) 58'
DF	13	Hồ Tấn Tài		(substituted on) 81'
Manager:
(South Korea) Park Hang-seo

Man of the Match:
Irfan Fandi (Singapore)

Assistant referees:
Yosuke Takabe (Japan)
Yusuke Hamamoto (Japan)
Fourth official:
Muhammad Usaid Jamal (Malaysia)

=== Vietnam vs Myanmar ===
3 January 2023
19:30 UTC+7

Vietnam	3–0	Myanmar
Kyaw Zin Lwin 8' (o.g.); Nguyễn Tiến Linh 27'; Châu Ngọc Quang 72'	Report (AFFMEC); Report (AFF)

Mỹ Đình National Stadium, Hanoi
Attendance: 11,575
Referee: Choi Hyun-jai (South Korea)

Vietnam	Myanmar

GK	23	Đặng Văn Lâm
CB	2	Đỗ Duy Mạnh
CB	12	Bùi Hoàng Việt Anh
CB	16	Nguyễn Thành Chung
RWB	13	Hồ Tấn Tài	(substituted off) 74'
LWB	5	Đoàn Văn Hậu	(substituted off) 61'
CM	19	Nguyễn Quang Hải	(substituted off) 61'
CM	8	Đỗ Hùng Dũng (c)	(substituted off) 48'
CM	10	Nguyễn Văn Quyết
CF	18	Phạm Tuấn Hải
CF	22	Nguyễn Tiến Linh	(substituted off) 46'
Substitutes:
FW	20	Phan Văn Đức	(substituted on) 46'
MF	15	Châu Ngọc Quang	(substituted on) 48'
MF	14	Nguyễn Hoàng Đức	(substituted on) 61'
DF	7	Nguyễn Phong Hồng Duy	(substituted on) 61'
DF	17	Vũ Văn Thanh	(substituted on) 74'
Manager:
(South Korea) Park Hang-seo

GK	23	Tun Nanda Oo
CB	3	Ye Min Thu
CB	6	Kyaw Min Oo (c)
CB	17	Thiha Htet Aung
RWB	12	Kyaw Zin Lwin
LWB	2	Hein Phyo Win		(substituted off) 57'
CM	13	Lin Htet Soe		(substituted off) 46'
CM	20	Aung Naing Win	(yellow card) 76'
CM	7	Lwin Moe Aung		(substituted off) 65'
SS	8	Hein Htet Aung
CF	9	Aung Kaung Mann		(substituted off) 84'
Substitutions:
DF	19	Ye Yint Aung		(substituted on) 46' (substituted off) 83'
DF	15	Win Moe Kyaw		(substituted on) 57'
MF	14	Wai Lin Aung		(substituted on) 65'
MF	21	Myat Kaung Khant		(substituted on) 83'
MF	16	Yan Naing Oo		(substituted on) 84'
Manager:
(Germany) Antoine Hey

=== Malaysia vs Singapore ===
3 January 2023
20:30 UTC+8

Malaysia	4–1	Singapore
Darren Lok 35'; Wilkin 50', 54'; Agüero 88'	Report (AFFMEC); Report (AFF)	Faris 85'

Bukit Jalil National Stadium, Kuala Lumpur
Attendance: 65,147
Referee: Mohammed Al Hoaish (Saudi Arabia)

Malaysia	Singapore

GK	16	Syihan Hazmi
RB	3	Quentin Cheng
CB	5	Sharul Nazeem	(substituted off) 78'
CB	6	Dominic Tan	(substituted off) 68'
LB	4	V. Ruventhiran
CM	18	Brendan Gan
CM	8	Stuart Wilkin
CM	14	Mukhairi Ajmal
RF	11	Safawi Rasid (c)	(substituted off) 60'
CF	9	Darren Lok	(substituted off) 60'
LF	7	Faisal Halim	(substituted off) 68'
Substitutions:
MF	10	Lee Tuck	(substituted on) 60'
FW	19	Ezequiel Agüero	(substituted on) 60'
DF	12	Fazly Mazlan	(substituted on) 68'
FW	22	Haqimi Azim	(substituted on) 68'
MF	17	David Rowley	(substituted on) 78'
Manager:
(South Korea) Kim Pan-gon

GK	18	Hassan Sunny
RB	22	Christopher van Huizen		(substituted off) 71'
CB	17	Irfan Fandi	(yellow card) 53'
CB	14	Hariss Harun (c)
LB	2	Shakir Hamzah		(substituted off) 62'
DM	8	Shahdan Sulaiman		(substituted off) 46'
RM	6	Anumanthan Kumar
LM	15	Shah Shahiran
AM	7	Song Ui-young		(substituted off) 62'
CF	11	Hafiz Nor		(substituted off) 78'
CF	9	Amy Recha
Substitutes:
FW	20	Shawal Anuar		(substituted on) 46'
FW	10	Faris Ramli		(substituted on) 62'
MF	23	Zulfahmi Arifin		(substituted on) 62'
DF	13	Farhan Zulkifli		(substituted on) 71'
DF	4	Nazrul Nazari		(substituted on) 78'
Manager:
(Japan) Takayuki Nishigaya
