= 2013 Lao League =

Lao League
- Season: 2013
- Matches: 84
- Goals: 217 (2.58 per match)
- Biggest home win: Hoang Anh Attapeu F.C. 14–0 Pheuanphatthana FC (11 May 2013)
- Biggest away win: Pheuanphatthana FC 0–12 Lao Police Club (28 April 2013)
- Highest scoring: Hoang Anh Attapeu F.C. 14–0 Pheuanphatthana FC (11 May 2013) Yotha F.C. 10–2 Lao Lane Xang F.C. (18 May 2013)
- Longest winning run: SHB Champasak (7 matches)
- Longest unbeaten run: SHB Champasak (9 matches)
- Longest losing run: Pheuanphatthana FC (11 matches)

Statistics of Lao League in the 2013 season. League started on 16 March 2013.

== Clubs ==
- SHB Champasak(New additional)
- Ezra
- Friends Development
- Hoang Anh Attapeu(New additional)
- Lao Lane Xang FC
- Lao Police Club
- Eastern Star FC
- Yotha FC

== Stadium capacities ==
Team	Stadium	Capacity
Ezra	New Laos National Stadium	25,000
Lao Police Club	New Laos National Stadium	25,000
Lao Lane Xang FC	Laos National Stadium	20,000
Friends Development	New Laos National Stadium	25,000
SHB Champasak	Champasak Stadium	11,000
Hoang Anh Attapeu	Laos National Stadium	20,000
Eastern Star FC	Laos National Stadium	20,000
Yotha FC	New Laos National Stadium	20,000

* Stadium use for home team maybe unconfirmed

== League table ==
Pos	Team	Pld	W	D	L	GF	GA	GD	Pts	Qualification or relegation
1	SHB Champasak (C)	14	12	2	0	54	12	+42	38	
2	Hoang Anh Attapeu	14	8	3	3	47	13	+34	27	
3	Yotha FC	14	8	2	4	61	23	+38	26	
4	Ezra F.C.	14	7	4	3	24	12	+12	25	
5	Lao Police Club	14	7	2	5	61	19	+42	23	
6	Lao Lane Xang FC	14	4	3	7	32	35	−3	15	
7	Eastern Star FC	14	2	0	12	16	74	−58	6	
8	Pheuanphatthana FC (R)	14	0	0	14	8	115	−107	0	Relegation

Updated to match(es) played on 2 June 2013. Source: Lao League table
Rules for classification: 1) points; 2) goal difference; 3) number of goals scored.
(C) Champions; (R) Relegated

== Top scorer ==
Season	Top scorer	Club	Goals
2013	–	–	0
