= 2023 Lao League 1 =

Pepsi Lao League 1
- Season: 2023
- Dates: 18 February – 2 July 2023
- Champions: Young Elephants
- AFC Challenge League: Young Elephants
- ASEAN Club Championship: Young Elephants
- Matches: 56
- Goals: 207 (3.7 per match)
- Top goalscorer: Rafinha (18 goals)
- Biggest home win: Ezra 8–0 Champasak (8 April 2023); Ezra 8–0 Viengchanh (20 May 2023)
- Biggest away win: Viengchanh 0–18 Luang Prabang (2 July 2023)
- Highest scoring: Viengchanh 0–18 Luang Prabang (2 July 2023)
- Longest winning run: Young Elephants (11 matches)
- Longest unbeaten run: Young Elephants (14 matches)
- Longest winless run: Viengchanh (10 matches)
- Longest losing run: Champasak (6 matches)
- All statistics correct as of complete.

The 2023 Lao League 1, known as the 2023 Pepsi Lao League 1 for sponsorship reasons, was the 34th season of the Lao League 1.

Young Elephants won their second league title in row, being undeafeated in during the entire season.

== Teams ==
A total of 8 teams participated in the 2023 Lao League 1 season. Namtha United participated in the league for the first time.

Note: Table lists in alphabetical order.

Team	Location	Stadium	Capacity	Previous season
Champasak	Champasak Province	Champasak Stadium	12,000	Lao League 1 (7th)
Ezra	Vientiane	New Laos National Stadium	25,000	Lao League 1 (3rd)
Lao Army	Vientiane	Army Stadium Km5	1,000	Lao League 1 (5th)
Luang Prabang	Luang Prabang Province	Luang Prabang Stadium	20,000	Lao League 1 (4th)
Master	Vientiane	New Laos National Stadium	25,000	Lao League 1 (2nd)
Namtha United	Luang Namtha Province	Luang Namtha Province Stadium	1,000	N/A
Young Elephants	Vientiane	National University of Laos Stadium	5,000	Lao League 1 (1st)
Viengchanh	Vientiane Province	New Laos National Stadium (outside field)	1,000	Lao League 1 (6th)

== Personnel and sponsoring ==
Team	Manager/head coach	Captain
Champasak	(Laos) Khamla Pinkeo	(Laos) Khonesavanh Thongchalern
Ezra	(Laos) Chandalaphone Liepvisay	(Laos) Keoviengphet Liththideth
Lao Army	(Laos) Kovanh Namthavixay	(Laos) Kitar Sisavath
Luang Prabang	(Laos) Wanchai Pakseelert	(Laos) Somlith Sengvanny
Master 7	(Thailand) Voottivat Daengsamerkiat	(Laos) Phoutdavy Phommasane
Namtha United	(Laos) Amphaivanh Chanthalavong	(Laos) Lo Viphath
Viengchanh	(Laos) Phoumphunya Xaysanavongphet	(Laos) Khamphoumy Hanevilay
Young Elephants	(Singapore) Satyasagara	(Laos) Bounphachan Bounkong

== Foreign players ==
The number of foreign players is restricted to four per team. A team can use a;; four foreign players on the field in each game, including at least one player from the AFC region.

Players name in bold indicates the player is registered during the mid-season transfer window.

Club	Player 1	Player 2	Player 3	AFC Player	Former Players
Champasak					
Ezra	(Guam) Takumi Ito	(South Korea) Park Eun-sung			
Lao Army					
Luang Prabang	(Japan) Rei Ishikawa	(Japan) Tsukasa Watanabe			
Master 7	(Brazil) Allan Machado	(Brazil) Rafinha	(Japan) Shunto Kanda	(Japan) Takaya Sugasawa	(Japan) Yukihiro Ayukawa (Japan) Rei Ishikawa (Japan) Hayato Kame (Japan) Takuya Watanabe
Namtha United	(Nigeria) Chijindu Sunday Edmund	(Nigeria) Nwoye Emmanuel	(Uganda) Edema Aziku	(Malaysia) Alexander Mahendran	
Viengchanh	(Cameroon) Brian Longnyo	(France) Johan Ella Ella	(Japan) Jun Kochi	(Japan) Takeshi Miki	
Young Elephants	(Argentina) Julián Bottaro	(Republic of Ireland) Clyde O'Connell	(Liberia) Emmanuel Jugbe Doe	(Myanmar) Kaung Myat Thu	(Cameroon) Dimitri Tagne (Japan) Tsubasa Mitani

== League table ==
Pos	Team	Pld	W	D	L	GF	GA	GD	Pts	Qualification or relegation
1	Young Elephants (C)	14	12	2	0	39	5	+34	38	Qualification for the 2024–25 AFC Challenge League preliminary stage and 2024–25 ASEAN Club Championship qualifying play-offs
2	Master 7	14	9	1	4	42	15	+27	28	
3	Ezra	14	7	4	3	39	12	+27	25	
4	Lao Army	14	6	5	3	20	14	+6	23	
5	Luang Prabang	14	3	5	6	33	17	+16	14	
6	Champasak	14	3	2	9	13	42	−29	11	
7	Namtha United	14	1	5	8	10	24	−14	8	
8	Viengchanh	14	2	2	10	11	78	−67	8	

Source: LFF
Rules for classification: 1) points; 2) goal difference; 3) number of goals scored.
(C) Champions

== Season statistics ==
=== Top scorers ===
Rank	Player	Club	Goals
1	(Brazil) Rafinha	Master 7	18
2	(Laos) Bounphachan Bounkong	Young Elephants	16
3	(Laos) Phathana Phommathep	Ezra	12
4	(Laos) Chony Wenpaserth	Ezra	9
5	(Laos) Cham Vanpaserth	Luang Prabang	8
5	(Laos) Somlith Sengvanny	Luang Prabang	8

== See also ==
- 2023 Prime Minister's Cup
