= Peter Phanthavong =

Laotian footballer (born 2006)

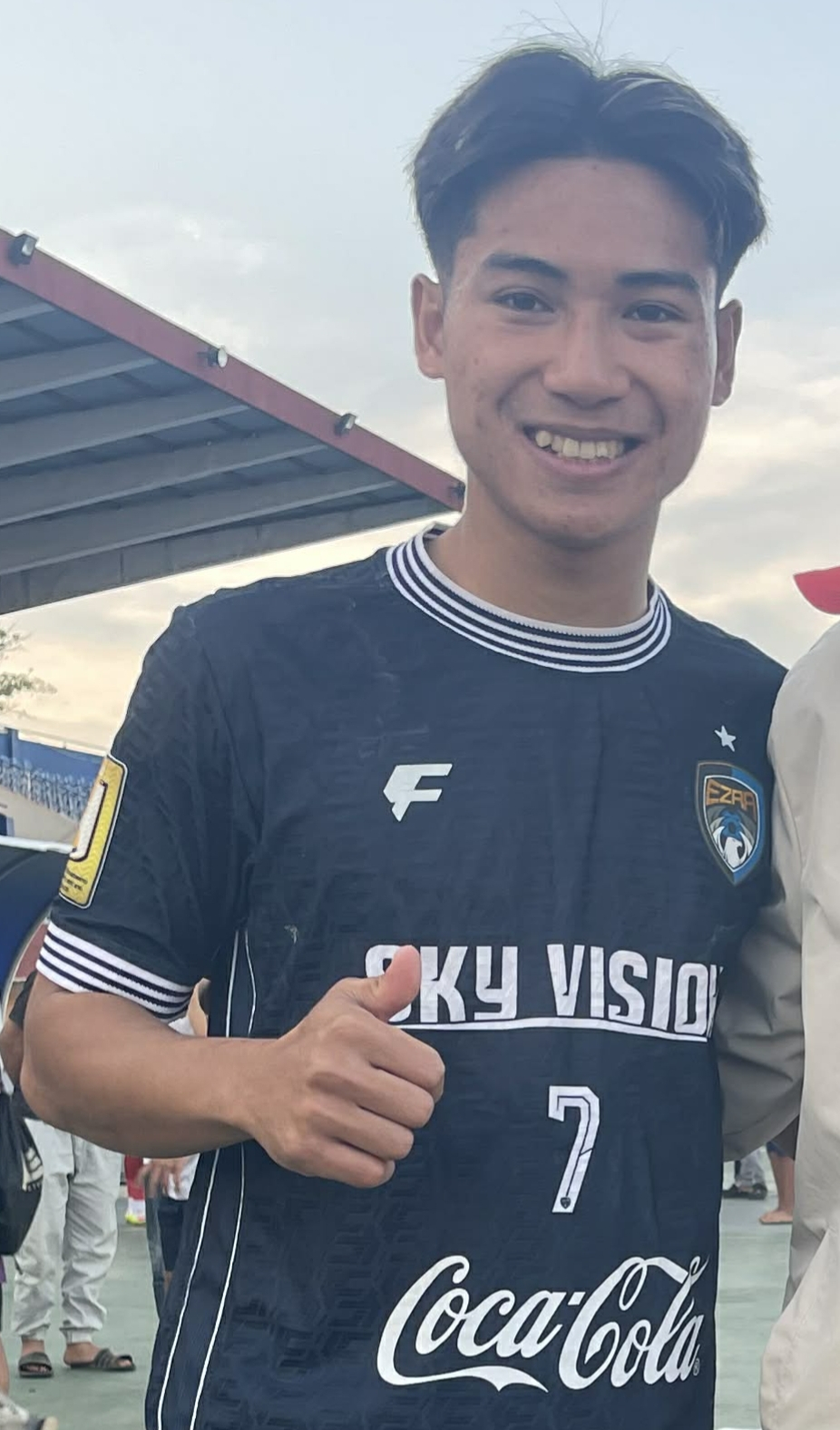
- Peter in 2026

Personal information
- Full name: Peter Phanthavong
- Date of birth: 15 February 2006 (age 20)
- Place of birth: Hue Xa, Champasak, Laos
- Height: 1.65 m (5 ft 5 in)
- Position: Striker

Team information
- Current team: Ezra
- Number: 7

Youth career
- 2017–2022: Ezra

Senior career*
| Years | Team | Apps | (Gls) |
| 2022– | Ezra | 48 | (48) |

International career^{‡}
| 2022–2023 | Laos U17 | 6 | (4) |
| 2022–2024 | Laos U20 | 15 | (6) |
| 2025– | Laos U23 | 7 | (1) |
| 2024– | Laos | 9 | (2) |
Medal record
Men's football
Representing Laos
AFF U-19 Youth Championship
| Runner-up | Indonesia 2022 | Team |
- * Club domestic league appearances and goals as of 14 March 2026 ‡ National team caps and goals as of 6 December 2025

Peter Phanthavong (Lao: ປີເຕີ້ ພັນທະວົງ, romanized: Pitoe Phanthavong; born 15 February 2006) is a Laotian footballer who plays as a striker for Lao League 1 side Ezra.

== Club career ==
Peter was born and raised as a Christian in Hue Xa village in Champasak. In 2017, he joined the academy of the Korean-backed team Ezra. At the age of 16, he was promoted to the first team to play in the 2022 Lao League. He appeared in 17 games and scored 7 goals in his first season in professional level.

In the 2024–25 season, he contributed in Ezra's first ever Lao League 1 title, scoring 20 goals in the campaign, thus being the second best goalscorer of the league.

== International career ==
In 2022, Peter featured in Laos U19 squad at the 2022 AFF U-19 Youth Championship. He scored 4 goals during the tournament, ranked second in the top scorers list. His team managed to reach the final, where they were defeated by Malaysia.

In 2023, he was part of the Laos U17 team that participated in the 2023 AFC U-17 Asian Cup. He scored 1 goal during the tournament, in the opening game against host team Thailand.

In December 2024, Peter was named in Laos national team squad for the 2024 ASEAN Championship. He scored his first international goal on 12 December in the match against Indonesia, which levelled the score at 3–3, at the Manahan Stadium.

== Career statistics ==
=== Club ===
As of match played 14 March 2026

Appearances and goals by club, season and competition
| Club | Season | League | | | National cup | | Continental | | Other | | Total | |
| Club | Season | Division | Apps | Goals | Apps | Goals | Apps | Goals | Apps | Goals | Apps | Goals |
|---|---|---|---|---|---|---|---|---|---|---|---|---|
| Ezra | 2022 | Lao League 1 | 17 | 7 | 2 | 1 | — | | — | | 19 | 8 |
| Ezra | 2023 | Lao League 1 | 1 | 0 | — | | — | | — | | 1 | 0 |
| Ezra | 2024–25 | Lao League 1 | 12 | 20 | 6 | 11 | — | | — | | 18 | 31 |
| Ezra | 2025–26 | Lao League 1 | 18 | 21 | 5 | 6 | 4 (Note: Appearance(s) in AFC Challenge League) | 1 | 2 (Note: Appearances in ASEAN Club Championship) | 0 | 29 | 28 |
| Career total | | | 48 | 48 | 13 | 18 | 4 | 1 | 2 | 0 | 67 | 67 |

=== International ===
As of match played 18 November 2025

Appearances and goals by national team and year
| National team | Year | Apps | Goals |
|---|---|---|---|
| Laos | 2024 | 5 | 1 |
| Laos | 2025 | 4 | 1 |
| Total | | 9 | 2 |

Scores and results list Laos' goal tally first.

| No. | Date | Venue | Opponent | Score | Result | Competition |
|---|---|---|---|---|---|---|
| 1. | 12 December 2024 | Manahan Stadium, Surakarta, Indonesia | Indonesia | 3–3 | 3–3 | 2024 ASEAN Championship |
| 2. | 10 June 2025 | New Laos National Stadium, Vientiane, Laos | Nepal | 2–0 | 2–1 | 2027 AFC Asian Cup qualification |

== Honours ==
Ezra

- Lao League 1: 2024–25, 2025–26
- Prime Minister's Cup: 2024–25, 2025–26

Individual

- Lao League 1 Best Player: 2025–26
