= Chony Wenpaserth =

Laotian footballer (born 2002)

Personal information
- Date of birth: 27 November 2002 (age 23)
- Place of birth: Ban Paktan, Vientiane, Laos
- Height: 1.70 m (5 ft 7 in)
- Position: Winger

Team information
- Current team: Salavan United
- Number: 11

Youth career
- –2020: Ezra

Senior career*
Years	Team	Apps	(Gls)
2020–2026	Ezra	71	(32)
2026–	Salavan United	1	(0)

International career^{‡}
2017–2018	Laos U16	13	(13)
2019–2020	Laos U19	10	(3)
2019–2023	Laos U23	16	(1)
2021–	Laos	30	(2)
- * Club domestic league appearances and goals as of 23:49, 8 October 2026 (UTC) ‡ National team caps and goals as of 23:49, 8 October 2026 (UTC)

Chony Wenpaserth (Lao: ໂຈນີ້ ແຫວນປະເສີດ, born 27 November 2002) is a Laotian footballer who plays as a winger for Lao League 1 club Salavan United and the Laos national team.

== Club career ==
Chony is a youth product of Ezra. He made Lao League 1 debut for Ezra in the 2020 season.

In the 2023 and 2024–25 Lao League 1 seasons, Chony finished in the top 5 goalscorers in the league.

On 14 June 2026, Chony was transferred to Salavan United.

== International career ==
=== Youth ===
Chony finished as the second best goalscorer in the 2017 AFF U-15 Championship. He later played at the JENESYS 2018 Japan-ASEAN U-16 Men's Football Tournament in Japan,

Chony netted 5 goals against the Northern Mariana Islands in the 2018 AFC U-16 Championship qualification.

In 2019, Chony represented the Laos under-18 national team at the 2019 AFF U-18 Youth Championship. He then played for under-22 national team at the 2021 and 2023 SEA Games, and the under-23 national team at the 2022 AFF U-23 Championship.

=== Senior ===
Chony made his debut for the Laos national team in 2021.

Chony represented Laos at the 2022, 2024 and 2026 ASEAN Championship.

== Personal life ==
Chony's idol is Brazilian footballer Kaká.

Alongside being a footballer, Chony works part-time as server in a restaurant.

== Honours ==
Ezra

- Lao League 1: 2024–25, 2025–26
- Prime Minister's Cup: 2024–25, 2025–26
