= 2024–25 Lao League 1 =

Pepsi Lao League 1
- Season: 2024–25
- Dates: 14 September 2024 – 1 March 2025
- Champions: Ezra
- AFC Challenge League: Ezra
- ASEAN Club Championship: Ezra
- Matches: 56
- Goals: 246 (4.39 per match)
- Top goalscorer: Takumu Nishihara (26 goals)
- Biggest home win: Ezra 12–0 Viengchanh (3 November 2024)
- Biggest away win: Champasak 0–5 Master (20 October 2024)
- Highest scoring: Ezra 12–0 Viengchanh (3 November 2024)
- Longest winning run: Ezra (7 matches)
- Longest losing run: Champasak (6 matches)
- All statistics correct as of 9 November 2024.

The 2024–25 Lao League 1, known as the 2024–25 Pepsi Lao League 1 for sponsorship reasons, was the 35th season of the Lao League 1.

== Teams ==
A total of 8 teams participated in the 2024–25 Lao League 1 season.

Note: Table lists in alphabetical order.

Team	Location	Stadium	Capacity	Previous season
Champasak	Champasak Province	Champasak Stadium	12,000	Lao League 1 (8th)
Ezra	Vientiane	New Laos National Stadium	25,000	Lao League 1 (2nd)
Lao Army	Vientiane	Army Stadium Km5	1,000	Lao League 1 (5th)
Luang Prabang	Luang Prabang Province	Luang Prabang Stadium	20,000	Lao League 1 (4th)
Master	Vientiane	New Laos National Stadium	25,000	Lao League 1 (3rd)
Namtha United	Luang Namtha Province	Luang Namtha Province Stadium	1,000	Lao League 1 (6th)
Young Elephants	Vientiane	National University of Laos Stadium	5,000	Lao League 1 (1st)
Mazda Viengchanh	Vientiane Province	New Laos National Stadium (outside field)	1,000	Lao League 1 (7th)

== Personnel and sponsoring ==
Team	Manager/head coach	Captain
Champasak	(Laos) Phouphet Sanouvong	(Laos) Vixay Khamsomphou
Ezra	(South Korea) Na Byung Soo	(Laos) Phathana Phommathep
Lao Army	(Laos) Kovanh Namthavixay	(Laos) Kitar Sisavath
Luang Prabang	(Laos) Donesavanh Xayyasombath	(Laos) Cham Vampaserth
Master	(Thailand) Vootthivat Daengsamerkaitd	(Laos) Keoviengphet Litthideth
Namtha United	(Laos) Phoumpanya Xaysanavongphet	(Laos) Xayyasith Singsavang
Young Elephants	(Laos) Phoutpasong Sengdalavong	(Laos) Kydavone Souvanny
Viengchanh	(Laos) Ole Boutsaart	(Laos) Kingpheth Phaimalaiphone

== Foreign players ==
The number of foreign players is restricted to six per team, with one slot reserved for AFC player and one slot reserved for ASEAN player. A team can use a maximum of four foreign players on the field in each game, including at least one player from the AFC region.

- Players named in **bold** indicates the player was registered during the mid-season transfer window.
- Former players named in italics are players that were out of squad or left the club within the season, after the pre-season transfer window, or in the mid-season transfer window, and at least had one appearance.

Club	Player 1	Player 2	Player 3	Player 4	AFC Player	ASEAN Player	Former Players
Champasak							
Ezra	(Guam) Takumi Ito	(Japan) Reo Nakamura					
Lao Army							
Luang Prabang	(Liberia) Emmanuel Jugbe Doe	(Japan) Shian Kawasaki	(Japan) Kohsuke Asano	(Japan) Takumi Ishikawa	(Japan) Tsukasa Watanabe	(Indonesia) **Mishbah Al-Mashuri**	(Japan) Hiromasa Ishikawa
Master	(Egypt) Mohamed Abed	(Ivory Coast) Akpa Augustin	(Ivory Coast) Michael Archange	(Mexico) Hugo Zambrano	(Japan) Jun Kochi	(Timor-Leste) Olagar Xavier	(Egypt) Saad Abdelaziz (England) George Thomas (Egypt) Mohamed Mostafa (Indonesia) Mishbah Al-Mashuri (Indonesia) Bagus Ilham
Namtha United	(Egypt) **Saad Abdelaziz**	(Japan) Ren Yoshioka	(Japan) Naomiki Takahashi	(Japan) Yuei Shimomura	(Japan) Shota Atsumi		(Japan) Kenshin Uneo (South Korea) Jo Yong-hyun
Young Elephants	(Brazil) Maycom Carvalho	(Japan) Yuta Suzuki	(Japan) Ryosuke Maeda	(Japan) Takumu Nishihara	(Japan) Shogo Akiba		(Uzbekistan) Shokhrukh Makhmudkhozhiev (Uzbekistan) Saveliy Abramov (Indonesia) Brylian Aldama
Viengchanh	(Chile) Cesar Farfan	(Ivory Coast) Ousmane Diane	(Nigeria) Wilson Okushi	(Nigeria) Michael Okushi	(Japan) Kotaro Nakamura		(Egypt) Mustafa Adel (Egypt) Rifaat El Shenawy (Egypt) Mohamed Abed (Uganda) Edema Aziku (Thailand) Gunyargon Charnsmut (Japan) Yusaku Wasaki

=== Foreign players by confederation ===
Foreign players by confederation
AFC	East Timor (1), Guam (1), Indonesia (1), Japan (15), Uzbekistan (1)
CAF	Egypt (2), Ivory Coast (3), Liberia (1), Nigeria (2)
CONCACAF	Mexico (1)
CONMEBOL	Brazil (1), Chile (1)

== League table ==
Pos	Team	Pld	W	D	L	GF	GA	GD	Pts	Qualification or relegation
1	Ezra (C)	14	12	2	0	56	13	+43	38	Qualification for the 2025–26 AFC Challenge League preliminary stage and 2025–26 ASEAN Club Championship Qualifying play-offs
2	Young Elephants	14	11	1	2	41	12	+29	34	
3	Master	14	9	2	3	40	18	+22	29	
4	Luang Prabang	14	8	0	6	28	19	+9	24	
5	Lao Army	14	5	1	8	27	32	−5	16	
6	Namtha United	14	3	3	8	24	30	−6	12	
7	Viengchanh	14	1	3	10	14	58	−44	6	
8	Champasak	14	1	0	13	15	63	−48	3	

Source: FIFA Lao League
Rules for classification: 1) points; 2) goal difference; 3) number of goals scored.
(C) Champions

== Season statistics ==
=== Top scorers ===
As of 2 March 2025.

Rank	Player	Club	Goals
1	(Japan) Takumu Nishihara	Young Elephants	26
2	(Laos) Peter Phanthavong	Ezra	20
3	(Laos) Chony Wenpaserth	Ezra	10

== See also ==
- 2024–25 Prime Minister's Cup
