= 2007 Prime Minister's Cup =

Prime Minister's Cup
Tournament details
- Country: Laos
- Dates: 20 Nov - 29 Nov 2007
- Teams: 8?

Final positions
- Champions: MPWT FC (Ministry of Public Works and Transport)
- Runners-up: Savannakhet FC

Tournament statistics
- Matches played: 16
- Goals scored: 52 (3.25 per match)

The 2007 Prime Minister's Cup was the fourth national football cup competition in Laos. The competition was won by MPWT FC (Ministry of Public Works and Transport), who beat Savannakhet FC 2–1 in the final.

== Format ==
The top four teams from the 2004 Lao League were joined by four provincial teams from outside Vientiane. These eight teams were split into two groups and a round robin series of matches was played. The top two teams from each group qualified for the semi-final knockout round to determine the two teams that would contest the final. The losers of the semi-finals met in a third place playoff. It is not clear whether there was a qualifying tournament for the provincial teams as there was in 2004 and 2006.

== Group stage ==
The four regional teams Savannakhet FC, Champasak FC, Oudomxay FC and Luang Prabang FC were drawn alongside the top four teams from the 2004 Lao League: Lao-American College FC, Banks FC, Vientiane FC and MPWT FC (Ministry of Public Works and Transportation).

=== Group A ===
Pos	Team	Pld	W	D	L	GF	GA	GD	Pts	Qualification
1	Savannakhet FC (A)	3	1	2	0	3	1	+2	5 (Note: Savannakhet FC won the draw for first place. It is not clear how this draw was carried out.)	Qualification for Semi-finals
2	MPWT FC (Note: MPWT was the new name for MCTPC FC (Ministry of Communication, Transportation, Post and Construction).) (A)	3	1	2	0	3	1	+2	5	Qualification for Semi-finals
3	Lao-American College FC	3	1	2	0	4	3	+1	5	
4	SHB Champasak	3	0	0	3	1	6	−5	0	

Updated to match(es) played on 25 November 2007. Source: rsssf.com
Rules for classification: 1) points; 2) goal difference; 3) number of goals scored.
(A) Advance to a further round

==== Results ====
===== Round 1 =====
21 November 2007

Lao-American College FC	1-1	MPWT FC
Unknown	Source	Unknown

21 November 2007

Savannakhet FC	2-0	Champasak FC
Unknown	Source	Unknown

===== Round 2 =====
23 November 2007

Lao-American College FC	2-1	Champasak FC
Unknown	Source	Unknown

23 November 2007

MPWT FC	0-0	Savannakhet FC
Unknown	Source	Unknown

===== Round 3 =====
25 November 2007

Savannakhet FC	1-1	Lao-American College FC
Unknown	Source	Unknown

25 November 2007

Champasak FC	0-2	MPWT FC
Unknown	Source	Unknown

=== Group B ===
Pos	Team	Pld	W	D	L	GF	GA	GD	Pts	Qualification
1	Bank FC (A)	3	2	1	0	12	0	+12	7	Qualification for Semi-finals
2	Vientiane FC (A)	3	2	1	0	10	5	+5	7	Qualification for Semi-finals
3	Oudomxay FC	3	1	0	2	4	13	−9	3	
4	Luang Prabang FC	3	0	0	3	4	12	−8	0	

Updated to match(es) played on 25 November 2007. Source: rsssf.com
Rules for classification: 1) points; 2) goal difference; 3) number of goals scored.
(A) Advance to a further round

==== Results ====
===== Round 1 =====
20 November 2007

VientianeFC	0-0	Bank FC
Unknown	Source	Unknown

22 December 2004

Luang Prabang FC	1-2	Oudomxay FC
Unknown	Source	Unknown

===== Round 2 =====
22 November 2007

Oudomxay FC	2-4	Vientiane FC
Unknown	Source	Unknown

22 November 2007

Banks FC	4-0	Luang Prabang FC
Unknown	Source	Unknown

===== Round 3 =====
25 November 2007

Luang Prabang FC	3-6	Vientiane FC
Unknown	Source	Unknown

25 November 2007

Oudomxay FC	0-8	Banks FC
Unknown	Source	Unknown

== Semi-finals ==
28 November 2007

Savannakhet FC	0-0	Vientiane FC
Unknown	Source	Unknown
Penalties
Unknown	3-2	Unknown

28 November 2007

Banks FC	1-3	MPWT FC
Unknown	Source	Unknown

== Third place playoff ==
29 November 2007

Vientiane FC	2-2	Banks FC
Unknown	Source	Unknown
Penalties
Unknown	5-4	Unknown

== Final ==
30 November 2007

MPWT FC	2-1	Savannakhet FC
Souliyavong 6'; Souliyavong 49'	Source	Keolammone 82'
