= Bounphachan Bounkong =

Laotian footballer (born 2000)

Personal information
- Full name: Bounphachan Bounkong
- Date of birth: 29 November 2000 (age 25)
- Place of birth: Savannakhet, Laos
- Height: 1.70 m (5 ft 7 in)
- Positions: Attacking midfielder; winger

Team information
- Current team: Luang Prabang
- Number: 17

Youth career
- 2015: Savannakhet

Senior career*
Years	Team	Apps	(Gls)
2015–2016	Savan United	10	(6)
2017	Tip Savan	0	(0)
2018–2026	Young Elephants	57	(43)
2023–2025	→ Svay Rieng (loan)	48	(25)
2026–	Luang Prabang	5	(7)

International career^{‡}
2018–2019	Laos U19	6	(6)
2018–2023	Laos U23	10	(5)
2018–	Laos	37	(9)
- * Club domestic league appearances and goals ‡ National team caps and goals as of 24 September 2026

Bounphachan Bounkong (Lao: ບຸນພະຈັນ ບຸນກອງ; born 29 November 2000) is a Laotian professional footballer who plays as an attacking midfielder or a winger for Lao League 1 club Luang Prabang, and captains the Laos national team.

== Career statistics ==
=== Club ===
Club	Season	Division	League		Cup		Continental		Total	
Club	Season	Division	Apps	Goals	Apps	Goals	Apps	Goals	Apps	Goals
Savan United	2015	Lao League 1	10	6					10	6
Young Elephants	2019	Lao League 1	15	12					15	12
Young Elephants	2020	Lao League 1	11	4					11	4
Young Elephants	2021	Lao League 1	2	3					2	3
Young Elephants	2022	Lao League 1	16	8			3	3	19	11
Young Elephants	2023	Lao League 1	13	16					13	16
Young Elephants	Total		57	43			3	3	60	46
Svay Rieng	2023-24	Cambodian Premier League	11	12					11	12
Svay Rieng	2024-25	Cambodian Premier League	28	12	2	2	12	4	42	18
Svay Rieng	2025-26	Cambodian Premier League	9	1			5	0	14	1
Svay Rieng	Total		48	25	2	2	17	4	67	31
Total career			115	74	2	2	20	7	137	83

=== International ===
As of match played 24 September 2026

National team	Year	Apps	Goals
Laos	2018	9	1
Laos	2019	3	0
Laos	2021	4	0
Laos	2022	4	1
Laos	2023	5	3
Laos	2024	4	2
Laos	2025	6	0
Laos	2026	2	2
Total		37	9

=== International Goals ===
Scores and results list Laos' goal tally first.

No	Date	Venue	Opponent	Score	Result	Competition
1.	16 October 2018	New Laos National Stadium, Vientiane, Laos	Mongolia	1–0	1–4	Friendly
2.	24 September 2022	Track & Field Sports Complex, Bandar Seri Begawan, Brunei	Maldives	1–1	1–3	Friendly
3.	25 March 2023	Dasharath Rangasala, Kathmandu, Nepal	Bhutan	1–0	2–1	2023 Prime Minister's Three Nations Cup
4.	25 March 2023	Dasharath Rangasala, Kathmandu, Nepal	Bhutan	2–1	2–1	2023 Prime Minister's Three Nations Cup
5.	12 October 2023	Dasharath Rangasala, Kathmandu, Nepal	Nepal	1–0	1–1	2026 FIFA World Cup qualification
6.	17 November 2024	Thammasat Stadium, Pathum Thani, Thailand	Thailand	1–1	1–1	Friendly
7.	9 December 2024	New Laos National Stadium, Vientiane, Laos	Vietnam	1–4	1–4	2024 ASEAN Championship
8.	31 March 2026	New Laos National Stadium, Vientiane, Laos	Nepal	1–0	1–0	2027 AFC Asian Cup qualification
9.	24 September 2026	Mong Kok Stadium, Kowloon, Hong Kong	Brunei	1–0	3–1	2026 FIFA ASEAN Cup

== Honours ==
Young Elephants

- Lao League 1: 2022
- Lao FF Cup: 2020, 2022

Svay Rieng

- AFC Challenge League runner-up: 2024–25
- Cambodian Premier League: 2023–24
- Hun Sen Cup: 2023–24

Laos

- Prime Minister's Cup runner-up: 2023

ASEAN All-Stars

- Maybank Challenge Cup: 2025

Individual

- AFF U-23 Championship Most Valuable Player: 2022
- AFF U-23 Championship Team of the Tournament: 2022
- Prime Minister's Cup Top Goalscorer: 2023
