= Prime Minister's Cup (Laos) =

- Founded: 2003; 23 years ago
- Region: Laos
- Teams: Various
- Current champions: Ezra (1st title)
- Most championships: Lao Bank FC; Yotha FC (2 titles)
- 2024–25 Prime Minister's Cup

The Lao Prime Minister's Cup (Lao: ການແຂ່ງຂັນບານເຕະ ຊິງຂັນພະນະທ່ານນາຍົກລັດຖະມົນຕີ ແຫ່ງ ສປປ ລາວ) is an annual association football tournament in Laos, first established in 2003 to provide a platform for teams outside of Vientiane to compete against those in the Lao Premier League. In addition to encouraging the development of association football across Laos, it is intended to celebrate the National Day of Laos on December 2. It is sponsored by Beerlao and called the "Battle of the Provinces".

== Format ==
Format consists of a qualifying stage for regional teams, usually 3 groups of 4 teams, played at the Savannakhet Stadium in Savannakhet, the Champasak Stadium in Pakse and the Luang Prabang Stadium in Luang Prabang. The winners of these groups then join the top teams from the Lao Premier League, divided into 2 groups with round-robin tournament format. The top two teams then proceed to the semi-final to determine the two teams who will play in the final.

== Winners and finalists ==
Year	Winner	Score	Runners-up	Venue
Prime Minister's Cup (2003–2013)
2003	MCTPC	2–1	Lao Army	Laos National Stadium
2004	Vientiane	2–1 (a.e.t.)	Savannakhet	Laos National Stadium
2005	Not played due to clash with both the Laos National Games and the 2005 SEA Games			
2006	Lao-American College	3–1	Vientiane	Laos National Stadium
2007	MPWT (2)	2–1	Savannakhet	Laos National Stadium
2008–09	Not held			
2010	Lao Bank	5–2 (a.e.t.)	Lao Police Club	New Laos National Stadium
2011	Lao Bank (2)	2–1	Lao Police Club	New Laos National Stadium
2012	SHB Champasak	5–0	Savannakhet	Champasak Stadium
2013	Lao Army	1–0	Par Vem	New Laos National Stadium
LFF Cup (2014)
2014	Lao Police Club	Round-robin	Lao Toyota	—N/a
The Minister Cup (2015)
2015	Lanexang United	5–0	Lao Army	New Laos National Stadium
2016–17	Not held			
LFF Cup (2019–2022)
2019	Lao Toyota	8–0	Evo United	New Laos National Stadium
2020	Young Elephant	2–1	Muanghat United	New Laos National Stadium
2021	Not held due to COVID-19 pandemic			
2022	Young Elephant (2)	2–1 (a.e.t.)	Master 7	New Laos National Stadium
Prime Minister's Cup (2024–present)
2024–25	Ezra	2–1 (a.e.t.)	Young Elephant	Champasak Stadium
2025–26	Ezra (2)	4–1	Lao Army	Luang Prabang Stadium
