= Takumi Ito =

Takumi Ito may refer to:

- Takumi Itō (伊藤 匠), Japanese professional shogi player
- Takumi Ito (footballer) (伊藤 匠), Guamanian professional footballer
