= 2006 Prime Minister's Cup =

Prime Minister's Cup
Tournament details
- Country: Laos

Final positions
- Champions: Lao-American College FC
- Runners-up: Vientiane FC

The 2006 Prime Minister's Cup was the third national football cup competition in Laos. The competition was won by Lao-American College FC who beat Lao Army FC 3–1 in the final. This was the first time the tournament had been held in two years as the 2004 edition was cancelled due to a clash with both the Laotian National Games and the 2005 Southeast Asian Games.

== Participants ==
Four teams qualified from the 2006 Lao League as a result of finishing in the top four places. A further four teams participated from provincial teams. It is unclear whether the provincial teams went through a qualification process similar to that undertaken in the 2003 Prime Minister's Cup.

=== Lao League teams ===
- MCTPC FC (Ministry of Communication, Transportation and Construction)
- Lao-American College FC
- Lao Army FC
- Vientiane FC

=== Provincial teams ===
- Savannakhet FC
- Champasak FC
- Bokeo FC
- Luang Prabang FC

Note: Although Savannakhet were recorded as taking part, the source records that they apparently withdrew.

== Results ==
It is not known whether there was a provincial qualifying tournament, nor are any of the group results (nor indeed the format of the initial stages of the competition) known. The following results however, are known:

== Third place playoff ==
Champasak FC	Beat	Unknown
Unknown	Source	Unknown

== Final ==
Lao-American College FC	3-1	Vientiane FC
	Source
