= 2010 Prime Minister's Cup =

Prime Minister's Cup
Tournament details
- Country: Laos

Final positions
- Champions: Bank FC
- Runners-up: MPS

The 2010 Prime Minister's Cup was the fifth national football cup competition in Laos. The competition was won by Bank FC, who beat MPS 5-2 in the final after extra time. This was the first time in three years that the national cup had been held. No tournament was held in 2008 or 2009 due to preparations for the 2009 Southeast Asian Games, as players from all clubs were called up to the Under 23 team in preparation.
