= Tenzin Norbu =

Bhutanese footballer (born 2001)

Personal information
- Full name: Tenzin Norbu
- Date of birth: 8 May 2001 (age 25)
- Place of birth: Thimphu, Bhutan
- Height: 1.78 m (5 ft 10 in)
- Position: Center-back

Team information
- Current team: Balga
- Number: 15

Senior career*
| Years | Team | Apps | (Gls) |
| 2018–2023 | Thimphu City | | |
| 2024– | Balga | 12 | (0) |

International career^{‡}
| 2017 | Bhutan U17 | | |
| 2019 | Bhutan U19 | 7 | (0) |
| 2023– | Bhutan | 9 | (1) |
- * Club domestic league appearances and goals ‡ National team caps and goals as of 25 March 2025

Tenzin Norbu (born 8 May 2001) is a Bhutanese professional footballer who plays as a center-back for Football West State League club Balga and the Bhutan national team.

== Early life ==
Norbu was born in Jampel village of Thimphu District, Bhutan.

== Club career ==
=== Thimphu City ===
Norbu represented Thimphu City in the 2021 AFC Cup qualifying play-offs against Club Eagles from the Maldives.

=== Balga ===
In 2024, he moved to Australia and began representing Balga in the Football West State League.

== International career ==
Norbu represented the Bhutan national under-19 team at both the 2019 SAFF U-18 Championship and 2020 AFC U-19 Championship qualifiers.

On 25 March 2023, Norbu made his debut for the Bhutan national team against Laos in the 2023 Prime Minister's Three Nations Cup. On 28 March, he scored his first international goal against hosts Nepal in a 1–1 draw.

Following his move to Australia, Norbu was dropped from the national squad. In March 2025, he was recalled to the team for the 2027 AFC Asian Cup qualifiers.

== Career statistics ==
=== International ===
As of 25 March 2025.

Bhutan
| Year | Apps | Goals |
|---|---|---|
| 2023 | 8 | 1 |
| 2025 | 1 | 0 |
| Total | 9 | 1 |

=== International goals ===
Scores and results list Bhutan's goal tally first.

| No. | Date | Venue | Opponent | Score | Result | Competition |
|---|---|---|---|---|---|---|
| 1. | 28 March 2023 | Dasharath Rangasala, Kathmandu, Nepal | Nepal | 1–0 | 1–1 | 2023 Three Nations Cup |
Last updated 28 March 2023
