= At Viengkham =

Laotian footballer, born 2000

Personal information
- Full name: At Viengkham
- Date of birth: 24 October 2000 (age 26)
- Place of birth: Xam Neua, Houaphanh, Laos
- Position: Left-back

Team information
- Current team: Master 7
- Number: 29

Senior career*
Years	Team	Apps	(Gls)
2019–	Master 7	22	(0)

International career
2022–2023	Laos U-23	5	(0)
2022–	Laos	12	(0)
- * Club domestic league appearances and goals

At Viengkham (born 24 October 2000) is a Laotian professional footballer who plays as a left-back for Lao League 1 club Master 7. He also plays for the Laos national team.

== International career ==
At represented Laos at the 2021 Southeast Asian Games. During the match against Cambodia, he collided with Phat Sokha, making him unconscious, and later saved the left-back from swallowing his tongue. This did not prevent him from receiving a yellow card. He also scored the decisive own goal against eventual silver medalists Thailand.
