= Laos national under-20 football team =

Major U-20 youth team of Laos

Laos U-20
- Association: Lao Football Federation
- Confederation: AFC (Asia)
- Sub-confederation: AFF (Southeast Asia)
- Head coach: Kanlaya Sysomvang
- Home stadium: New Laos National Stadium
- FIFA code: LAO
First colours	Second colours

The Laos national under-20 association football team is controlled by the Lao Football Federation.

== Current squad ==
The following 23 players were selected for the 2025 AFC U-20 Asian Cup qualification.

No.	Pos.	Player	Date of birth (age)	Club
1	GK	Kop Lokphathip	8 May 2006 (age 20)	(Lao Football Federation) Ezra
12	GK	Soulisak Souvankham	10 September 2007 (age 18)	(Lao Football Federation) Chanthabouly
18	GK	Soulisak Manpaseuth	1 November 2008 (age 17)	(Lao Football Federation) Champasak
2	DF	Xayasouk Keovisone	21 July 2006 (age 20)	(Lao Football Federation) Ezra
3	DF	Chanthavisouk Phongsavath	16 December 2007 (age 18)	(Lao Football Federation) Ezra
4	DF	Khammanh Thapaseuth	31 December 2007 (age 18)	(Lao Football Federation) Ezra
5	DF	Sisavath Keomoungkhoun	5 October 2006 (age 19)	(Lao Football Federation) Namtha United
13	DF	Khounvang Soundala	13 November 2006 (age 19)	(Lao Football Federation) Namtha United
14	DF	Phetvixay Phimmasen	8 January 2005 (age 21)	(Lao Football Federation) Ezra
15	DF	Matheo Ackhavong	14 July 2007 (age 19)	(French Football Federation) Cholet
16	DF	Ki Mounkanyah	18 November 2009 (age 16)	(Lao Football Federation) Master 7
6	MF	Cy John Adams	7 September 2007 (age 19)	(United States Soccer Federation) Heat FC
7	MF	Sayfon Keohanam	11 July 2006 (age 20)	(Football Association of Thailand) Suphanburi
17	MF	Xayxana Sihalath	11 August 2006 (age 20)	(Lao Football Federation) Ezra
19	MF	Phousomboun Panyavong	20 June 2007 (age 19)	(Lao Football Federation) Lao Army
21	MF	Inthida Xayyasane	10 August 2006 (age 20)	(Lao Football Federation) Master 7
23	MF	Bounphaeng Xaysombath	5 February 2005 (age 21)	(Lao Football Federation) Luang Prabang
8	FW	Phetsamone Sihathep	30 March 2006 (age 20)	(Lao Football Federation) Young Elephants
9	FW	Thanousack Nanthavongdouangsy	21 August 2006 (age 20)	(Lao Football Federation) Ezra
10	FW	Peter Phanthavong	15 February 2006 (age 20)	(Lao Football Federation) Ezra
11	FW	Somvang Choummaly	2 April 2006 (age 20)	(Lao Football Federation) Master 7
20	FW	Songkran Liyasak	13 April 2006 (age 20)	(Lao Football Federation) Namtha United
22	FW	Yotxay Xayamphone	4 July 2005 (age 21)	(Lao Football Federation) Ezra

== Fixtures ==
Win Draw Lose

=== 2026 ===
31 August 2026 AFC U-20 ACQ	Australia	2–0	Laos	Vientiane, Laos
19:00	Neill 13' (pen.); Marinucci 49'	Report		Stadium: New Laos National Stadium; Referee: Omar Al-Yaqoubi (Oman)

3 August 2026 AFC U-20 ACQ	Laos	0–3	Indonesia	Vientiane, Laos
19:00		Report	Fabio 5'; Gholy 40', 63'	Stadium: New Laos National Stadium; Referee: Wissam Rabie (Syria)

6 August 2026 AFC U-20 ACQ	Malaysia	2–1	Laos	Vientiane, Laos
	Haziq 7'; Fadhlul Hadi 76'	Report	Odin 60'	Stadium: New Laos National Stadium; Referee: Songkran Bunmeekiart (Thailand)
