= Young Elephants FC =

Association football club based in Vientiane

Young Elephants
- Full name: Young Elephants Football Club
- Nickname: The Elephants
- Short name: YEFC
- Founded: 2015; 11 years ago
- Ground: New Laos National Stadium
- Capacity: 25,000
- President: Jason Lim
- Head coach: Kanlaya Sysomvang
- League: Lao League 1
- 2025–26: Lao League 1, 2nd of 10
Home colours	Away colours

Young Elephants Football Club (Lao: ສະໂມສອນບານເຕະຊ້າງນ້ອຍ), is a professional football club based in Vientiane, Laos. It competes in the Lao League 1. It is owned by Singaporean businessman Jason Lim since 2018. It has won 2 league titles (back to back undefeated) and 1 Lao FF Cup.

In 2019, the club took part in the Sheikh Kamal International Club Cup in Chittagong, Bangladesh.

== History ==
Young Elephants were founded in 2015 by the Lao Football Federation (LFF) with the aim of giving exposure to footballers aged 16 to 19 years old and helping them launch their professional careers. But in 2017, the LFF gave up ownership of the club due to rules around club licensing and privatisation and sought out Jason Lim, who was well known to the federation due to his voluntary work as team manager for the Laos under-23 between 2009 and 2017. A year later, Jason Lim took the reins and roped in other Singaporeans based in Laos which are Kevin Pereira and Philip Tay as the club board members. Yet, this has required significant outlay. Since 2018, Jason Lim has been the president and chairman of the Young Elephants, injecting his passion and resources into the team. Jason Lim said that he has spent close to $1 million since taking over the club and also visits Peninsula Plaza back in Singapore each year to buy the latest football boots for the whole squad so that his players "truly feel like professional players with the bulk of the expenditure has gone towards raising players salaries. Under Jason Lim’s visionary leadership, the Young Elephants experienced a meteoric rise in the Laotian football landscape. What makes the Young Elephants’ achievements even more astounding is the fact that the players comprise approximately 80% of the Laos national team. Their dominance on the domestic front is a testament to their talent and influence within the country. Young Elephants have cultivated a culture of unity, determination, and hard work under the guidance of their Singaporean head coach, Satyasagara, who took charge of the club in March 2022. His coaching philosophy goes beyond the tactical aspects of the game with him winning the league undefeated back to back in both season. Satyasagara has created an environment where each player feels valued and understood. By establishing a deep bond with his team, the coach has fostered a sense of trust and camaraderie that fuels their on-field performances.

=== Back-to-back Invincibles (2022–2023) ===
In the 2022 season, the Young Elephants embarked on a Lao League 1 campaign that would go down in the history of Laos football. With an unbeaten run that spanned the entire league, they asserted their authority on the pitch. Out of the 18 matches they played, the Elephants emerged victorious in 13 and secured five draws, amassing 44 points.Their tally was a resounding 11 points ahead of their nearest challengers, Master 7, leaving no doubt that they were the deserving 2022 Lao League 1 champions. After securing their maiden Lao League 1 title, the Young Elephants faced the daunting challenge of defending their crown in the 2023 season. Many wondered if they could maintain the same level of dominance and go undefeated once again. The answer came with resounding clarity. Once again, the Elephants proved their indomitable spirit by remaining unbeaten and clinching their second consecutive Lao League 1 championship. Out of the 14 games played in the 2023 season, the Elephants emerged winners in 12 and secured two draws, demonstrating their unyielding hunger for success.

=== AFC Cup debut ===
Young Elephants make their 2022 AFC Cup debut being drawn in Group I with Viettel from Vietnam, Hougang United from Singapore and Phnom Penh Crown from Cambodia, however, the club suffered a defeat to all of them and crash out from the group stage.

Young Elephants also played in the 2023–24 AFC Cup qualifying play-off facing against Phnom Penh Crown in the 2nd preliminary round but lost 3–0 thus didn't qualified to the 2023–24 AFC Cup.

Young Elephants also qualified to the 2024–25 AFC Challenge League directly after winning the 2023 Lao League 1. Young Elephants was also invited to the 2024–25 ASEAN Club Championship but was drawn in the qualifying round against Cambodian club Preah Khan Reach Svay Rieng. Young Elephants lost 8–3 on aggregate and didn't qualified which they turned their main focus on the 2024–25 AFC Challenge League. The club was then drawn in Group D alongside Taiwanese club Tainan City and Myanmar club Shan United. Young Elephants bowed out from the tournament after losing 2–0 to Shan United and 3–2 to Tainan City with Indonesian Brylian Aldama becoming the only player to score in the tournament for the club

== Team Image ==
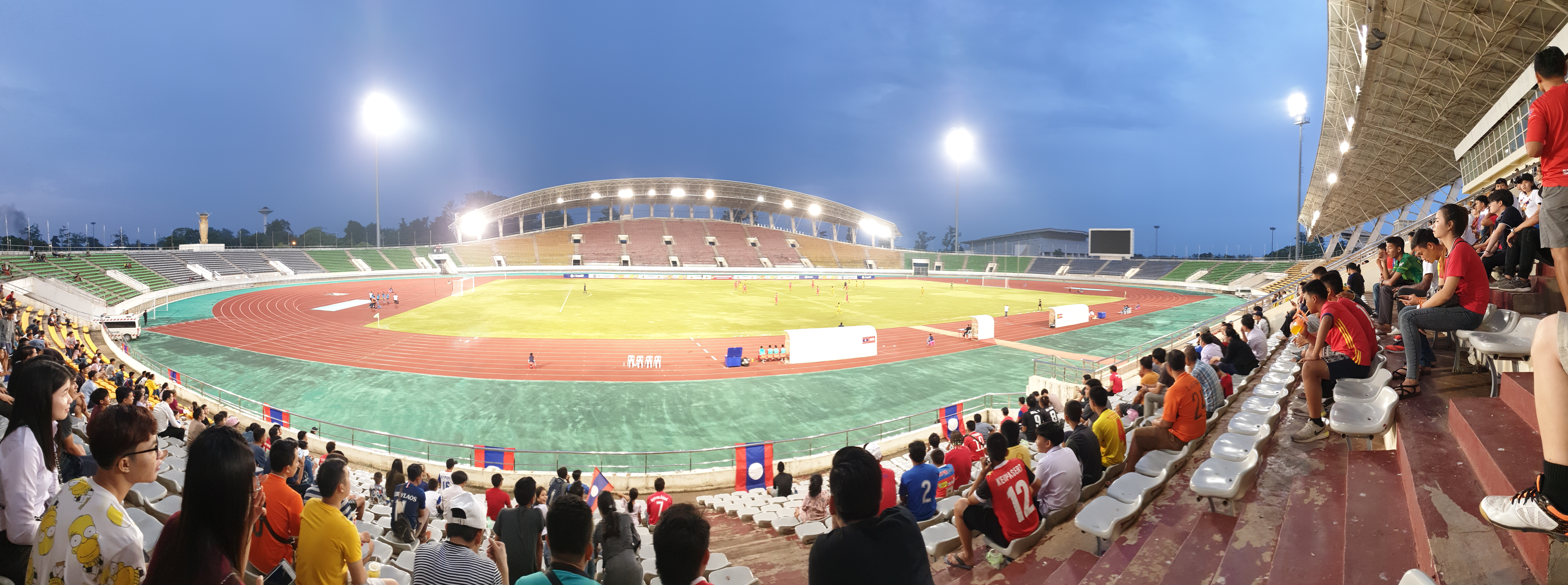
Young Elephants home games are played at the New Laos National Stadium.

=== Stadium ===
Young Elephants play their home matches at the New Laos National Stadium. The stadium is located about 17 km from the centre of Vientiane City and comprises a 25,000-seat capacity stadium.

=== Kit suppliers and shirt sponsors ===
Period	Kit Manufacturer	Sponsors
2019–present	(Thailand) FBT	2024–present

== Players ==
As of 8 February 2025

Note: Flags indicate national team as defined under FIFA eligibility rules; some limited exceptions apply. Players may hold more than one non-FIFA nationality.

No.	Pos.	Nation	Player
1	GK	LAO	Solasak Thilavong
2	DF	LAO	Thatsaphone Khampanith
3	DF	LAO	Sengvilay Chanthasily
6	DF	LAO	Kittisak Phomvongsa
8	MF	LAO	Anousone Xaypanya
9	FW	LAO	Kydavone Souvanny
11	FW	EGY	Saad El Mokanen
17	MF	LAO	Bounphachan Bounkong
18	MF	LAO	Phahatxay Keomany

No.	Pos.	Nation	Player
19	FW	LAO	Kadam Koneyer
20	DF	LAO	Sengdaovy Hanthavong
22	MF	LAO	Phithack Kongmathilath
23	MF	LAO	Phouthone Innalay
25	FW	LAO	Phetsavanh Bounsoulinh
26	DF	LAO	Phonsak Sisavath
32	MF	LAO	Chanthaphone Waenvongsoth
47	FW	LAO	Thavisok Latsavong
77	FW	JPN	Tsukasa Shimomura

=== Out on loan ===
Note: Flags indicate national team as defined under FIFA eligibility rules; some limited exceptions apply. Players may hold more than one non-FIFA nationality.

No.	Pos.	Nation	Player

== Technical staff ==
Position	Name
President	(Singapore) Jason Lim
CEO	(Laos) Bon Soundala
Vice-president 1	(Singapore) Kevin Pereira
Vice-president 2	(Laos) Douangmany Souvannavong
General secretary	(Singapore) Jeremy Choong
Team manager	(Germany) Patrick Riedener
EXCO member	(Singapore) Philip Tay
Head coach	(Laos) Kanlaya Sysomvang
Assistant coach	(Laos) Sengvilay Chanthasily
Goalkeeping coach	(Laos) Vilasack Vanthanoulath
Physiotherapist	(Laos) Tom Douangphachanh
Kit manager	(Laos) Vongphachan Phoummeethone (Laos) Anouluck Sibounnavong
Director of football	(Scotland) Andrew Woodward

=== Manager history ===
Name	Period
(Laos) Bounma Patthammavong	2018
(Laos) Kanlaya Sysomvang	2018
(Laos) Kovanh Namthavixay	2019
(Singapore) Perianan Sugunan	2020
(Laos) Bounlap Khenkitisack	2021
(Singapore) Satyasagara	2022–2023
(Laos) Phoutpasong Sengdalavong	2024–2025
(Laos) Kanlaya Sysomvang	2025–2026

== Continental record ==
=== AFC ===
Season	Competition	Round	Club	Home	Away	Aggregate
2022	AFC Cup	Group I	(Vietnam) Viettel	1–5		4th
2022	AFC Cup	Group I	(Singapore) Hougang United	1–3		4th
2022	AFC Cup	Group I	(Cambodia) Phnom Penh Crown	2–4		4th
2023–24	AFC Cup	Preliminary round 2	(Cambodia) Phnom Penh Crown		0–3	0–3
2024–25	AFC Challenge League	Group D	(Myanmar) Shan United	0–2		3rd
2024–25	AFC Challenge League	Group D	(Chinese Taipei) Tainan City	2–3		3rd

=== AFF ===
Season	Competition	Round	Club	Home	Away	Aggregate
2024–25	ASEAN Club Championship	Qualifying play-off	(Cambodia) Preah Khan Reach Svay Rieng	2–3	1–5	3–8

== Honours ==
- Lao League 1
  - Champions (2): 2022, 2023
- Prime Minister's Cup
  - Champions (2): 2020, 2022
