= Friends Development F.C. =

Friends Development
- Full name: Friends Development Football Club
- Dissolved: 2014

Friends Development Football Club is a football club based in Laos. It was previously known as Pheuanphatthana FC until 2012. They play in the Lao League, the top national football league in Laos.
