= 2023 Prime Minister's Three Nations Cup =

International football tournament

Tournament details
- Host country: Nepal
- City: Kathmandu
- Dates: 22–31 March 2023
- Teams: 3 (from 1 confederation)
- Venue: 1 (in 1 host city)

Final positions
- Champions: Nepal
- Runners-up: Laos
- Third place: Bhutan

Tournament statistics
- Matches played: 4
- Goals scored: 10 (2.5 per match)
- Attendance: 9,064 (2,266 per match)
- Top scorer: (Laos) Bounphachan Bounkong (2 goals)
- Best player: Aayush Ghalan

The 2023 Prime Minister's Three Nations Cup was a friendly international association football tournament organized and controlled by All Nepal Football Association (ANFA) and was played from 22 to 31 March 2023 at Kathmandu, Nepal.

== Participating nations ==
The FIFA Rankings of participating national teams as of 22 December 2022.

Team	FIFA Rankings	Confederation
Nepal (Host)	174	AFC
Bhutan	185	AFC
Laos	188	AFC

== Venue ==
All four matches will be played in the following venue.

Kathmandu	2023 Prime Minister's Three Nations Cup is located in Nepal
Dasharath Rangasala Stadium	2023 Prime Minister's Three Nations Cup is located in Nepal
Capacity: 15,000	2023 Prime Minister's Three Nations Cup is located in Nepal

== Match officials ==
Referees

- (Maldives) Sinan Hussain
- (Maldives) Javiz Mohamed

Assistant Referees

- (Maldives) Jaufar Rasheed
- (Maldives) Afsah Ahmed

== Standings ==
Pos	Team	Pld	W	D	L	GF	GA	GD	Pts	Qualification
1	Nepal (H)	2	1	1	0	3	1	+2	4	Final
2	Laos	2	1	0	1	2	3	−1	3	Final
3	Bhutan	2	0	1	1	2	3	−1	1	

Source: Goalnepal.
(H) Hosts

== Matches ==
22 March 2023
18:00

Nepal	2–0	Laos
Tamang 29'; Nawayug 54'	Report

Dasharath Rangasala Stadium, Kathmandu
Attendance: 5,170
Referee: Sinan Hussain (Maldives)

25 March 2023
18:00

Laos	2–1	Bhutan
Bounkong 3', 72'	Report	Gyeltshen 34'

Dasharath Rangasala Stadium, Kathmandu
Attendance: 500
Referee: Javiz Mohamed (Maldives)

28 March 2023
18:00

Bhutan	1–1	Nepal
Norbu 19'	Report	Thakuri 90'

Dasharath Rangasala Stadium, Kathmandu
Attendance: 6,640
Referee: Sinan Hussain (Maldives)

== Final ==
31 March 2023
17:30

Nepal	2–1	Laos
Ghalan 24'; Dangi 88'	Report	Sangvilay 17'

Dasharath Rangasala Stadium, Kathmandu
Attendance: 9,165
Referee: Javiz Mohamed (Maldives)

== Statistics ==
=== Goalscorers ===
There were 10 goals scored in 4 matches, for an average of 2.5 goals per match.

2 goals

- (Laos) Bounphachan Bounkong

1 goal

- (Bhutan) Chencho Gyeltshen
- (Bhutan) Tenzin Norbu
- (Laos) Phoutthavong Sangvilay
- (Nepal) Manish Dangi
- (Nepal) Ayush Ghalan
- (Nepal) Nawayug Shrestha
- (Nepal) Ananta Tamang
- (Nepal) Dipak Raj Singh Thakuri
