= Phathana Phommathep =

Laotian footballer

Personal information
- Full name: Phathana Phommathep
- Date of birth: 27 February 1999 (age 27)
- Place of birth: Ban Oudomvilay, Savannakhet, Laos
- Height: 1.70 m (5 ft 7 in)
- Positions: Winger; forward

Team information
- Current team: Ezra
- Number: 19

Youth career
- 2009–2013: Ezra
- 2014: Lanexang United

Senior career*
Years	Team	Apps	(Gls)
2015–2016	Lanexang United		
2017	Kalasin	19	(2)
2018	Chonburi	0	(0)
2019	→ Phuket City (loan)	8	(1)
2020–	Ezra	72	(22)

International career^{‡}
2015–2016	Laos U-19	8	(1)
2017–2022	Laos U-23	5	(0)
2017–	Laos	21	(2)
Medal record
Laos U-19
AFF U-19 Youth Championship
Bronze medal – third place	AFF U-19 Championship	2015
- * Club domestic league appearances and goals as of 11 October 2026 ‡ National team caps and goals as of 15 December 2024

Phathana Phommathep (born 27 February 1999) is a Laotian professional footballer who plays as a winger or forward for Lao League 1 club Ezra and the Laos national football team.

== Early career ==
Born in a small village called Oudomvilay located in Savannakhet Province, he started playing football at an early age as his uncle was a coach of the local side. Aged eight, Phathana joined his first team and made his way to the incipient Korean-backed Ezra During his time here, he attracted the interest from Lanexang United, who saw him as a footballer they could build their squad around.

== Club career ==
Making one appearance in the Mekong Cup against Buriram United of Thailand in 2016, coach Leonardo Vitorino praised Phathana as the most talented player he had seen in Lao football. However, his progress as a player would be hampered by the disbandment of his club Lanexang United. In June 2017, he signed for Kalasin F.C. of Thailand. In 2017, he signed for Chonburi.

== International career ==
Phathana played in the 2016 AFC U-19 Championship qualifiers. On June 7, 2017, the Savannakhet native made his senior team debut in a 4–0 loss to UAE.

=== International goals ===
Scores and results list Laos' goal tally first.

No	Date	Venue	Opponent	Score	Result	Competition
1.	2 October 2017	Estádio Campo Desportivo, Taipa, Macau	Macau	1–0	1–3	Friendly
2.	12 December 2024	Manahan Stadium, Surakarta, Indonesia	Indonesia	2–1	3–3	2024 ASEAN Championship

== Personal life ==
Alongside being a footballer, Phathana is also as a taxi driver.

== Honours ==
Lanexang United

- Lao Premier League: 2016
- Prime Minister's Cup: 2015
- Mekong Club Championship runners-up: 2016

Ezra

- Lao League 1: 2024–25, 2025–26
- Prime Minister's Cup: 2024–25, 2025–26
