= 2003 Prime Minister's Cup =

Prime Minister's Cup
Tournament details
- Country: Laos

Final positions
- Champions: MCTPC FC (Ministry of Communication, Transportation and Construction)
- Runners-up: Lao Army FC

The 2003 Prime Minister's Cup was the inaugural national football cup competition in Laos. The competition was won by MCTPC FC (Ministry of Communication, Transportation and Construction), who beat Lao Army FC 2–1 in the final.
