= Takumi Ito (footballer) =

Guamanian footballer (born 2000)

Personal information
- Date of birth: February 3, 2000 (age 26)
- Place of birth: Tamuning, Guam
- Position: Defender

Team information
- Current team: Ezra
- Number: 20

Senior career*
Years	Team	Apps	(Gls)
2016–2017	Rovers		
2017–2018	Islanders		
2018–2021	Ichikawa SC		
2022–	Ezra	21	(1)

International career
2022–	Guam	2	(0)
- * Club domestic league appearances and goals

Takumi Ito (Japanese: 伊藤匠; born February 3, 2000) is a Guamanian soccer player who plays as a defender for Ezra.

== Club career ==
Ito was voted 2017 IIAAG Most Valuable Player.

=== Ichikawa SC ===
In 2021, Ito signed for Japanese side Ichikawa SC.

=== Ezra ===
Before the 2022 season, Ito signed for Ezra in Laos.

== International career ==
In the 2023 AFC Asian Cup qualifications play-off round against Cambodia in the second leg, Ito came on as a substitution making his international debut for Guam. In October 2023, he was called up to the first round of the 2026 FIFA World Cup qualification against Singapore.
