= Laos national under-23 football team =

Laos U-23
- Association: Lao Football Federation
- Confederation: AFC (Asia)
- Sub-confederation: AFF (Southeast Asia)
- Head coach: Leonardo Vitorino
- Captain: Damoth Thongkhamsavath
- Home stadium: New Laos National Stadium
- FIFA code: LAO
First colours	Second colours

First international
- Singapore 4–0 Laos (Petaling Jaya, Malaysia; 1 September 2001)

Biggest win
- Laos 7–0 Mongolia (Vientiane, Laos; 29 March 2015)

Biggest defeat
- Australia 7–1 Laos (Bacolod, Philippines; 22 November 2005)

Southeast Asian Games
- Appearances: 12 (first in 2001)
- Best result: Fourth place (2009)

AFF U-23 Championship
- Appearances: 3
- Best result: Third place (2022)

The Laos national under-23 football team (also known as Laos Under-23, Laos U-23 or Laos Olympic Team) represents Laos in international football competitions in Olympic Games, Asian Games and SEA Games, as well as other under-23 international football tournaments.

== Results and fixtures ==
Win Draw Loss Fixture

=== 2025 ===
3 December 2025 SEA Games	Laos	1–2	Vietnam	Bangkok, Thailand
16:00 UTC+7	Khampane 33'	Report	Nguyễn Đình Bắc 28', 60'	Stadium: Rajamangala Stadium; Referee: Rustam Lutfullin (Uzbekistan)

6 December 2025 SEA Games	Malaysia	4–1	Laos	Bangkok, Thailand
16:00 UTC+7	Haykal 33'; Haqimi 59'; Moses 62'; Muhammad 90'	Report	Bounphaeng 4'	Stadium: Rajamangala Stadium; Referee: Payam Heydari (Iran)

== Coaching staff ==
=== Coaches ===
Position	Name
Team manager	(Laos) Khonesamai Chanthavongsay
Head coach	(Brazil) Leonardo Vitorino
Assistant coach	(Thailand) Suphachai Klangkrasea (Laos) Kanlaya Sysomvang (Laos) Khola Oundala
Goalkeeper coach	(Laos) Thilavong Phetthavyxay
Fitness coach	(Laos) Bounlap Siliamphone
Physiotherapists	(Laos) Sivilay Sihathep
Doctor	(Laos) Buaphan Sihavong
Equipment manager	(Laos) Chanthaboun Minsy
Equipment manager	(Laos) Souksomphone Vongkhamphoui
Media manager	(Laos) Thipphakone Phakasy

== Managerial history ==
Name	Period
(England) David Booth	2014–2015
(Singapore) Mike Wong	2017
(Singapore) V. Selvaraj	2020
(Germany) Michael Weiß	2022
(Italy) Guglielmo Arena	2023
(South Korea) Ha Hyeok-jun	2024–2025

== Players ==
The following 23 players were called up for the 2025 ASEAN U-23 Championship.

No.	Pos.	Player	Date of birth (age)	Club
	GK	Kop Lokphathip	8 May 2006 (age 20)	(Lao Football Federation) Ezra
	GK	Soulisak Manpaseuth	1 November 2008 (age 18)	(Lao Football Federation) Champasak
	GK	Soulisak Souvankham	10 September 2007 (age 19)	(Lao Football Federation) Chanthabouly
	DF	Saleumsay Phommavong	7 August 2003 (age 23)	(Lao Football Federation) Ezra
	DF	Anantaza Siphongphan	9 November 2004 (age 22)	(Lao Football Federation) Ezra
	DF	Khammanh Thapaseuth	30 November 2007 (age 18)	(Lao Football Federation) Ezra
	DF	Xayasouk Keovisone	21 July 2006 (age 20)	(Lao Football Federation) Ezra
	DF	Oun Phetvongsa	29 September 2003 (age 23)	(Lao Football Federation) Namtha United
	DF	Aliyakone Phongsavanh	2 February 2006 (age 20)	(Lao Football Federation) Ezra
	DF	Phetdavanh Somsanith	24 April 2004 (age 22)	(Lao Football Federation) Master
	DF	Chittakone Vannachone	24 December 2004 (age 21)	(Lao Football Federation) Luang Prabang
	DF	Phouluang Vinnavong	12 January 2005 (age 21)	(Lao Football Federation) Champasak
	MF	Sayfon Keohanam	11 July 2006 (age 20)	(Football Association of Thailand) Suphanburi
	MF	Chanthavixay Khounthoumphone	17 February 2004 (age 22)	(Lao Football Federation) Ezra
	MF	Khampane Douangvilay	5 February 2004 (age 22)	(Lao Football Federation) Master
	MF	Bounphaeng Xaysombath	5 February 2005 (age 21)	(Lao Football Federation) Luang Prabang
	MF	Phudthachak Vongsili	13 July 2005 (aged 20)	(Lao Football Federation) Chanthabouly
	MF	Damoth Thongkhamsavath	3 April 2004 (age 22)	(Vietnam Football Federation) Dong A Thanh Hoa
	MF	Khonesavanh Keonuchanh	4 June 2004 (age 22)	(Italian Football Federation) Rome City Institute
	FW	Peter Phanthavong	15 February 2006 (age 20)	(Lao Football Federation) Ezra
	FW	Phousomboun Panyavong	20 June 2007 (age 19)	(Lao Football Federation) Lao Army
	FW	Somvang Chummani	2 April 2006 (age 20)	(Lao Football Federation) GB Mazda
	FW	Arvilai Siphavanh	6 May 2005 (age 21)	(Lao Football Federation) PM Sekong

== Competitive records ==
=== Olympic Games ===
Summer Olympic Games Record
Year	Result	Position	Pld	W	D	L	GF	GA
(Spain) 1992	Did not qualify							
(United States) 1996	Did not qualify							
(Australia) 2000	Did not enter							
(Greece) 2004	Did not qualify							
(China) 2008	Did not qualify							
(United Kingdom) 2012	Did not qualify							
(Brazil) 2016	Did not qualify							
(Japan) 2020	Did not qualify							
(France) 2024	Did not qualify							
(United States) 2028	To be determined							
Total		0 / 8						

=== AFC U-23 Asian Cup ===
AFC U-22/23 Championship Record									Qualifications Record					
Hosts / Year	Result	Position	GP	W	D*	L	GS	GA	GP	W	D	L	GS	GA
(Oman) 2013	Did not qualify								5	2	1	2	7	7
(Qatar) 2016	Did not qualify								3	1	1	1	7	3
(China) 2018	Did not qualify								3	1	1	1	4	8
(Thailand) 2020	Did not qualify								3	1	0	2	3	8
(Uzbekistan) 2022	Did not qualify								3	1	0	2	3	6
(Qatar) 2024	Did not qualify								2	0	0	2	2	9
(Saudi Arabia) 2026	Did not qualify								3	1	1	1	3	8
(Japan) 2028	To be determined								To be determined					
Total	–	–	–	–	–	–	–	–	22	7	4	11	29	49

=== Asian Games ===
Asian Games record
Year	Result	Position	Pld	W	T	L	GF	GA
1951 to 1998	See Laos national football team							
(South Korea) 2002	Did not enter							
(Qatar) 2006	Did not enter							
(China) 2010	Did not enter							
(South Korea) 2014	Group stage	27	3	0	0	3	0	9
(Indonesia) 2018	Group stage	23	4	1	0	3	4	8
(China) 2022	Did not enter							
(Japan) 2026	Did not qualify							
Total	2/7	–	7	1	0	6	4	17

=== SEA Games ===
SEA Games
Year	Round	GP	W	D	L	GF	GA
(Malaysia) 2001	Group stage	4	1	0	3	2	9
(Vietnam) 2003	Group stage	3	0	0	3	0	8
(Philippines) 2005	Group stage	4	1	0	3	5	15
(Thailand) 2007	Group stage	3	0	1	2	1	6
(Laos) 2009	Fourth Place	5	1	2	2	5	7
(Indonesia) 2011	Group stage	5	1	1	3	10	11
(Myanmar) 2013	Group stage	4	1	1	2	5	12
(Singapore) 2015	Group stage	5	2	0	3	6	13
(Malaysia) 2017	Group stage	4	1	0	3	5	8
(Philippines) 2019	Group stage	5	1	1	3	4	12
(Vietnam) 2021	Group stage	4	0	1	3	4	10
(Cambodia) 2023	Group stage	4	0	1	3	2	11
(Thailand) 2025	Group stage	2	0	0	2	2	6
Total	Best: Fourth Place	52	9	7	32	47	128

- Since 2001, the SEA Games football tournament became available for under-23 teams only.

=== ASEAN U-23 Championship ===
ASEAN U-23 Championship record
Year	Result	Pld	W	T	L	GF	GA
(Thailand) 2005	Group stage	3	1	0	2	5	6
(Indonesia) 2011	Cancelled						
(Cambodia) 2019	Withdrew						
(Cambodia) 2022	Third place	3	2	0	1	4	3
(Thailand) 2023	Group stage	2	0	1	1	3	6
(Indonesia) 2025	Group stage	2	0	1	1	1	4
Total	Best: Third Place	10	3	2	5	13	19
