= Luang Prabang Stadium =

Multi-purpose stadium in Laos

- Interactive map of Luang Prabang Stadium
- Location: Luang Prabang, Laos
- Coordinates: 19.8713°N 102.1318°E
- Capacity: 12,000
- Surface: Grass

Tenants
- Luang Prabang United 2018; Luang Prabang F.C. 2022–

The Luang Prabang Stadium is a multi-purpose stadium in Luang Prabang , Laos. It is used mostly for football matches, Lao League 1 but also for athletics, ceremonies and concerts. It is also the stadium that is used for the Luang Prabang Games. The Luang Prabang stadium holds 12,000 people. It has pink, yellow and blue tribunes, a small roof above the main tribune and a running track around the field.
