= SHB Vientiane F.C. =

Association football club in Laos

SHB Vientiane
- Full name: SHB Vientiane Football Club
- Founded: 2008; 18 years ago (as Champasak FC)
- Dissolved: 2016; 10 years ago
- Ground: Chao Anouvong Stadium
- Capacity: 20,000
- Chairman: Đỗ Quang Hiển
- League: Lao Premier League
- 2015: 3rd
| Home colours | Away colours |

SHB Vientiane Football Club was a professional association football club based in Laos that played in the Lao League until 2016.

== History ==
Established in 2008 as Champasak FC, the club was purshased by the Vietnamese bank SHB (Saigon – Hanoi Commercial Joint Stock Bank) in 2012, and was rebranded to SHB Champasak FC. With an increased budget from the new owner, club won the 2013 Lao League. The club was then relocated to Vientiane and changed their name to SHB Vientiane FC. They finished as runner-up in the 2014 Lao League. In March 2016, SHB abandoned the team's ownership. Due to lacks of funding, the club withdrew from the 2016 Lao Premier League and dissolved.

== Invitational tournament record ==
| Season | Competition | Round | Club | Score |
|---|---|---|---|---|
| 2014 | Singapore Cup | Preliminary Round | (Philippines) Loyola Meralco Sparks | 1–7 |
