= Luang Prabang F.C. =

Luang Prabang
- Full name: Luang Prabang Football Club
- Short name: LPBFC
- Founded: 2022; 4 years ago
- Ground: Luang Prabang Stadium
- Capacity: 20,000
- Owner: Luang Prabang Provincial Administration Committee
- Head coach: Kola Oundala
- League: Lao League 1
- 2025–26: Lao League 1, 7th of 10
- Website: Website
Home colours	Away colours	Third colours

Luang Prabang Football Club (Lao: ສະໂມສອນບານເຕະ ຫຼວງພະບາງ), currently known as Luang Prabang EDL due to sponsorship reasons) is a professional football club located in Luang Prabang, Laos. It plays in the Lao League 1.

== History ==
Luang Prabang Football Club was established in 2022.

On 2 July 2023, Luang Prabang defeated Viengchanh FC 18–0 during a 2023 Lao League 1 game. This is the biggest top-flight league scoreline in Southeast Asia history.

Ahead of the 2026–27 season, the club signed sponsorship deal with Électricité du Laos, changing their naem to Luang Prabang EDL FC.

== Players ==
=== Current squad ===
As of 9 October 2026

Note: Flags indicate national team as defined under FIFA eligibility rules; some limited exceptions apply. Players may hold more than one non-FIFA nationality.

No.	Pos.	Nation	Player
1	GK	LAO	Obee Vongthachit
4	DF	LAO	Kitdavong Sankhorman
5	DF	LAO	Chittakone Vannachone
6	DF	LAO	Chekky Inthisone
7	FW	LAO	Sisouphan Vongsaly
8	DF	LAO	Choun Mittapap
9	FW	LAO	Cham Vanpaserth
10	FW	LBR	Emmanuel Jugbe Doe
11	MF	LAO	Khamkeng Sintasone
12	MF	LAO	Phonesavanh Khonephachit
14	MF	JPN	Masaya Tahara
16	MF	LAO	Kilanrer Dercherxouavve

No.	Pos.	Nation	Player
17	FW	LAO	Bounphachan Bounkong
19	MF	LAO	Bounpheng Saysombat
20	GK	LAO	Anavin Malathong
21	MF	BRA	John Caio
22	DF	JPN	Sho Komine
24	DF	LAO	Vilakone Khettisak
25	GK	JPN	Shotaro Ishii
27	MF	LAO	Sinnakhone Khumanykham
29	MF	LAO	Kitsana Inthavongsa
66	MF	LAO	Sinthana Thammavong
96	MF	LAO	Vannaphone Yodthiya
99	DF	LAO	Kaharn Phetsivilay (Captain)

== Coaching staff ==
Position	Name
Chairman	(Canada) Claire Newell
President	(Laos) Noy Nuansy
Sporting director	(United States) Peter Vermes
Team manager	(Laos) Soubanh Keopanya
Head coach	(Laos) Kola Oundala
Assistant coach	(Laos) Thiphhasone Sittiphone (Laos) Phouthasak Silikhoun
Goalkeeper coach	(Laos)
Fitness coach	(Laos)
Doctor	(Laos)
Physical Trainer	(Laos)
Kit man	(Laos) Keooudone Phansachit
