= Ezra F.C. =

Ezra
- Full name: Ezra Football Club
- Nickname: Ezra Eagles
- Short name: EFC
- Founded: 2003; 23 years ago
- Ground: New Laos National Stadium
- Capacity: 25,000
- Owner: Arun Kim
- Head coach: Chandalaphone Liepvisay
- League: Lao League 1
- 2025–26: Lao League 1, 1st of 10 (champions)
Home colours	Away colours

Ezra Football Club (Lao: ສະໂມສອນບານເຕະ ເອສະຣາ) is a professional football club located in Vientiane, Laos. It plays in the Lao League 1. In the 2024–25 season, Ezra won its first Lao League 1 title.

== History ==
Ezra Football Club was established in 2003 by Arun Kim, a South Korean coach. Operating primarily as a youth academy with a humanitarian focus, the club provided free training, housing, and education to underprivileged Laotian players, modeled on the South Korean youth development system.

Throughout the 2010s and early 2020s, Ezra became a prolific "production line" for the Laos national football team, frequently prioritizing the development and transfer of young players to the Thai League 1 over domestic trophy pursuits. Despite intermittent absences from the top flight to focus on its academy roots, the club maintained a competitive presence in the Lao League 1.

The club's most significant achievement occurred during the 2024–25 season. Under the management of Byung Soo Na, Ezra secured its first top-flight title on 26 February 2025. By finishing at the top of the table, Ezra ended the multi-year dominance of Young Elephants FC and earned its debut qualification for the 2025–26 ASEAN Club Championship and regional AFC competitions.

== Players ==
=== Current squad ===
As of 14 September 2026' Note: Flags indicate national team as defined under FIFA eligibility rules; some limited exceptions apply. Players may hold more than one non-FIFA nationality.

No.	Pos.	Nation	Player
2	DF	LAO	Phoutthavong Sangvilay
4	DF	LAO	Anantaza Siphongphan (Captain)
5	DF	LAO	Khammanh Thapaseut
6	DF	LAO	Xeedee Phomsavanh
7	MF	LAO	Sayfon Keohanam
8	MF	LAO	Binly Donsanouphit
9	FW	JPN	Koki Narita
10	FW	LAO	Peter Phanthavong
11	FW	JPN	Kazuha Sudo
13	GK	LAO	Xayaphet Phoutthasy
14	MF	JPN	Reo Nakamura
16	MF	KOR	Kim Min-jun
18	DF	JPN	Reiya Matsuda

No.	Pos.	Nation	Player
19	MF	LAO	Phathana Phommathep
20	GK	LAO	Kop Lokphathip
21	MF	LAO	Phouthalak Thongsanith
22	MF	JPN	Yunosuke Sugiura
25	DF	LAO	Sisattana Kanlaya
30	DF	LAO	Xayasouk Keovisone
34	GK	LAO	Soulisak Souvankham
38	DF	KOR	Yoon Dabin
47	DF	LAO	Thanyavouth Xaychaleun
77	MF	LAO	Daophahad Kamkasomphou
88	MF	LAO	Bounpaseut Sengsavang
99	DF	LAO	Seng Athit Manivilay

== Coaching staff ==
Position	Name
Head coach	(South Korea) Byung-soo Na
Assistant coach	(South Korea) Kim Ban-seok (South Korea) Jung Keum-cheon (Laos) Chandalaphone Liepvisay
Goalkeeper coach	(Laos) Sounikone Souphusith
Fitness coach	(Laos) Xaiyaphet Somphengboupha
Match analyst	(Laos) Khamfong Vansavath
Doctor	(Laos) Sonexay Kounlavong
Physiotherapists	(South Korea) Kim Jae-yang
Interpreter	(South Korea) Mideum Kim

== Continental record ==
Year	Competition	Round	Opponent	Home	Away	Aggregate
2025–26	AFC Challenge League	Qualifying play-off	(Myanmar) Yangon United	—N/a	1–1 (a.e.t.) (5–3 p)	—N/a
2025–26	AFC Challenge League	Group D	(Philippines) Manila Digger	1–3		4th out of 4
2025–26	AFC Challenge League	Group D	(Cambodia) Preah Khan Reach Svay Rieng	0–3		4th out of 4
2025–26	AFC Challenge League	Group D	(Mongolia) SP Falcons	1–3		4th out of 4
2025–26	ASEAN Club Championship	Qualifying play-off	(Myanmar) Shan United	1–2	0–1	1–3
2026–27	AFC Challenge League	Play-off round	(Myanmar) Yangon United	—N/a	1–2	—N/a
2026–27	ASEAN Club Championship	Qualifying play-offs	(Myanmar) Shan United	3–2	0–1	3–3 (a.e.t.) (2–3 p)

== Honours ==
- Lao League 1
  - Champions (2): 2024–25, 2025–26
- Prime Minister's Cup
  - Champions (2): 2024–25, 2025–26
