= New Laos National Stadium =

Multi-use stadium in Vientiane, Laos

- ສະໜາມກິລາແຫ່ງຊາດຫຼັກ16
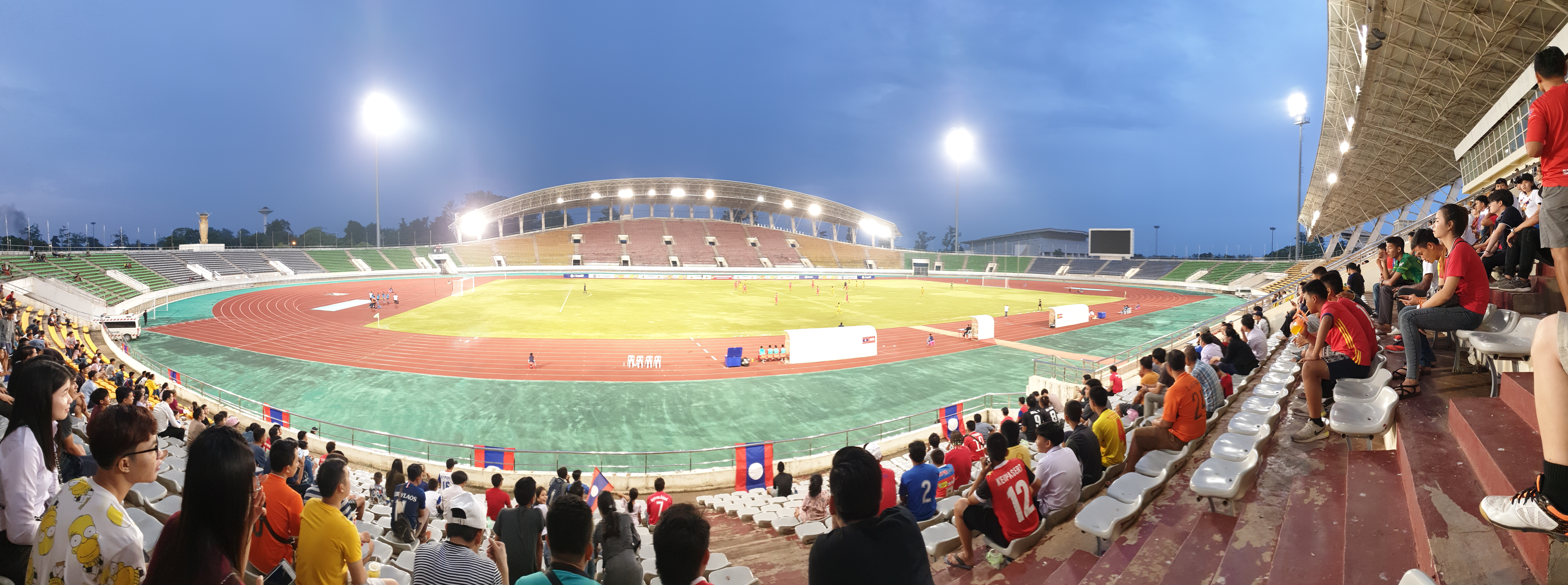
- Interior of the stadium on a matchday
- Interactive map of New Laos National Stadium
- Location: Xaythany, Vientiane Prefecture, Laos
- Coordinates: 18°3′43″N 102°42′14″E
- Owner: Lao government caretaker Lao Football Federation
- Capacity: 20,000
- Surface: Grass; Track
- Field size: 95 by 60 m

Construction
- Opened: 2009
- Main contractor: Shanghai Construction Group

Tenants
- Laos national football team Lao League 1 (Vientiane teams)

The New Laos National Stadium (also known as Lao National Stadium KM16) is a multi-use stadium in Vientiane, Laos that was built in 2009. It is used mostly for football matches. It hosted the opening and closing ceremonies for the 2009 SEA Games.

== Overview ==
Exterior view of New Laos National Stadium

Upon completion, it replaced the previous Laos National Stadium. The ALaos National Sports Complex is located about 17 km from the centre of Vientiane City and comprises a 25,000-seat main stadium, a 2,000-seat indoor aquatics complex, with an outdoor warm-up pool, a tennis centre consisting of 2,000 seating capacity centre court plus six other tennis courts, two indoor stadiums each with a seating capacity of 3,000 and an indoor shooting range with 50 seats.

The North Korea national team played their 2026 FIFA World Cup qualification matches at the stadium.

During the 12th Laos National Games, it host the opening and closing ceremonies and the athletic events.

== International fixtures ==
Date	Competition	Team	Score	Team
22 October 2010	2010 AFF Championship qualification	Timor-Leste	0–5	Philippines
22 October 2010	2010 AFF Championship qualification	Laos	0–0	Cambodia
24 October 2010	2010 AFF Championship qualification	Cambodia	4–2	Timor-Leste
24 October 2010	2010 AFF Championship qualification	Philippines	2–2	Laos
26 October 2010	2010 AFF Championship qualification	Philippines	0–0	Cambodia
26 October 2010	2010 AFF Championship qualification	Laos	6–1	Timor-Leste
16 February 2011	2012 AFC Challenge Cup qualification	Laos	1–1	Chinese Taipei
2 March 2013	2014 AFC Challenge Cup qualification	Afghanistan	1–0	Sri Lanka
3 July 2011	2014 FIFA World Cup qualification	Laos	6–2	Cambodia
28 July 2011	2014 FIFA World Cup qualification	Laos	1–6	China
10 September 2012	Friendly	Laos	2–1	Philippines
2 March 2013	2014 AFC Challenge Cup qualification	Laos	1–1	Mongolia
4 March 2013	2014 AFC Challenge Cup qualification	Mongolia	0–1	Afghanistan
4 March 2013	2014 AFC Challenge Cup qualification	Sri Lanka	2–4	Laos
6 March 2013	2014 AFC Challenge Cup qualification	Sri Lanka	3–0	Mongolia
6 March 2013	2014 AFC Challenge Cup qualification	Laos	1–1	Afghanistan
7 June 2013	Friendly	Laos	2–5	Singapore
16 November 2013	Friendly	Laos	1–1	Guam
12 October 2014	2014 AFF Championship qualification	Timor-Leste	4–2	Brunei
12 October 2014	2014 AFF Championship qualification	Laos	3–2	Cambodia
14 October 2014	2014 AFF Championship qualification	Brunei	2–4	Laos
14 October 2014	2014 AFF Championship qualification	Myanmar	0–0	Timor-Leste
16 October 2014	2014 AFF Championship qualification	Timor-Leste	2–3	Cambodia
16 October 2014	2014 AFF Championship qualification	Brunei	1–3	Myanmar
18 October 2014	2014 AFF Championship qualification	Cambodia	0–1	Myanmar
18 October 2014	2014 AFF Championship qualification	Laos	2–0	Timor-Leste
20 October 2014	2014 AFF Championship qualification	Myanmar	2–1	Laos
20 October 2014	2014 AFF Championship qualification	Cambodia	1–0	Brunei
29 May 2015	Friendly	Laos	0–2	Afghanistan
11 June 2015	2018 FIFA World Cup qualification	Laos	2–2	Myanmar
16 June 2015	2018 FIFA World Cup qualification	Laos	0–2	Lebanon
8 September 2015	2018 FIFA World Cup qualification	Laos	0–2	Kuwait
17 November 2015	2018 FIFA World Cup qualification	Laos	0–5	South Korea
29 May 2016	Friendly	Laos	1–1	Nepal
2 June 2016	2019 AFC Asian Cup qualification	Laos	0–1	India
11 October 2016	2019 AFC Asian Cup qualification	Laos	1–1	Maldives
21 March 2018	Friendly	Laos	0–1	Cambodia
27 March 2018	Friendly	Laos	2–2	Bangladesh
16 October 2018	Friendly	Laos	1–4	Mongolia
28 May 2019	Friendly	Laos	2–1	Sri Lanka
31 May 2019	Friendly	Laos	2–2	Sri Lanka
6 June 2019	2022 FIFA World Cup qualification	Laos	0–1	Bangladesh
23 March 2022	Friendly	Laos	1–0	Mongolia
27 March 2022	Friendly	Laos	3–2	Brunei
17 October 2023	2026 FIFA World Cup qualification	Laos	0–1	Nepal
20 March 2025	Friendly	Laos	1–2	Sri Lanka
10 June 2025	2027 AFC Asian Cup qualification	Laos	2–1	Nepal
9 October 2025	2027 AFC Asian Cup qualification	Laos	0–3	Malaysia
19 November 2025	2027 AFC Asian Cup qualification	Laos	0–2	Vietnam
31 March 2026	2027 AFC Asian Cup qualification	Nepal	0–1	Laos

AFF/ASEAN Championship
Date	Competition	Team	Score	Team
8 November 2018	2018 AFF Championship	Laos	0–3	Vietnam
16 November 2018	2018 AFF Championship	Laos	1–3	Myanmar
24 December 2022	2022 AFF Championship	Laos	0–6	Vietnam
30 December 2022	2022 AFF Championship	Laos	0–2	Singapore
9 December 2024	2024 ASEAN Championship	Laos	1–4	Vietnam
15 December 2024	2024 ASEAN Championship	Laos	1–1	Philippines
25 July 2026	2026 ASEAN Championship	Laos	0–5	Thailand
1 August 2026	2026 ASEAN Championship	Laos	1–4	Philippines

Others international matches
Date	Competition	Team	Score	Team
6 June 2024	2026 FIFA World Cup qualification	North Korea	1–0	Syria
11 June 2024	2026 FIFA World Cup qualification	North Korea	4–1	Myanmar
10 September 2024	2026 FIFA World Cup qualification	North Korea	2–2	Qatar
14 November 2024	2026 FIFA World Cup qualification	North Korea	2–3	Iran
19 November 2024	2026 FIFA World Cup qualification	North Korea	0–1	Uzbekistan

== See also ==
- Stadium diplomacy
