= 2022 AFF U-19 Youth Championship squads =

Football tournament squads

The 2022 AFF U-19 Youth Championship was an international football tournament held in Indonesia from 2 July to 15 July 2022. Due to the effects of the COVID-19 pandemic, the 11 national teams involved in the tournament were required to register a squad of 28 players instead of the traditional 23, and at least 3 of whom must be goalkeepers; only players in these squads are eligible to take part in the tournament.

== Group A ==
=== Brunei ===
Head coach: Faisalani Ghani

No.	Pos.	Player	Date of birth (age)	Caps	Goals	Club
	GK	Riyan Aiman Jali	9 January 2003 (age 23)	6	0	(Football Association of Brunei Darussalam) DPMM FC
	GK	Abdul Taufik Talip	29 December 2003 (age 22)	4	0	(Football Association of Brunei Darussalam) Kota Ranger
	GK	Danish Aiman Mardianni	9 January 2003 (age 23)	0	0	(Football Association of Brunei Darussalam) DPMM FC
	DF	Maverick Lim Soon Heng	4 June 2003 (age 23)	3	0	(Football Association of Brunei Darussalam) DPMM FC
	DF	Abdul Malik Norazlan	2 March 2005 (age 21)	0	0	(Football Association of Brunei Darussalam) Tabuan
	DF	Ammar Rawi Abdul Suwardy		0	0	(Football Association of Brunei Darussalam) Kota Ranger
	DF	Danial Hariz Syukrin	23 March 2004 (age 22)	0	0	(Football Association of Brunei Darussalam) Tabuan
	DF	Hadif Mansur Zulkarman	27 July 2004 (age 22)	0	0	(Football Association of Brunei Darussalam) Tabuan
	DF	Hirman Abdul Latip	25 March 2003 (age 23)	0	0	(Football Association of Brunei Darussalam) Indera SC
	DF	Shufri Khairee Izzani Jeffri		0	0	
	DF	Syaherrul Affendy Syahmirul Nizam	13 January 2004 (age 22)	0	0	(Football Association of Brunei Darussalam) DPMM FC
	MF	Eddy Shahrol Omar	4 October 2003 (age 23)	8	1	(Football Association of Brunei Darussalam) Kasuka FC
	MF	Wafiq Naqiuddin Zain	16 June 2003 (age 23)	1	0	(Football Association of Brunei Darussalam) Kota Ranger
	MF	Abdul Hafiy Herman	6 February 2005 (age 21)	0	0	(Football Association of Brunei Darussalam) Tabuan
	MF	Ahmad Danish Joini	17 February 2004 (age 22)	0	0	(Football Association of Brunei Darussalam) Tabuan
	MF	Ali Munawwar Abdul Rahman	30 June 2004 (age 22)	0	0	(Football Association of Brunei Darussalam) Tabuan
	MF	Danisyh Syariee Masrazni	11 September 2004 (age 22)	0	0	(Football Association of Brunei Darussalam) DPMM FC
	MF	Haziq Naqiuddin Syamra	25 May 2004 (age 22)	0	0	(Football Association of Brunei Darussalam) DPMM FC
	MF	Iddzaham Aleshahmezan Metali	5 April 2004 (age 22)	0	0	(Football Association of Brunei Darussalam) Tabuan
	MF	Syafiq Hilmi Shahrom	3 April 2006 (age 20)	0	0	(Football Association of Brunei Darussalam) DPMM FC
	MF	Wafiq Danish Hasimulabdillah	13 January 2005 (age 21)	0	0	(Football Association of Brunei Darussalam) DPMM FC
	FW	Hakeme Yazid Said	8 February 2003 (age 23)	4	0	(Football Association of Brunei Darussalam) DPMM FC
	FW	Bazli Aminuddin	24 June 2003 (age 23)	1	0	(Football Association of Brunei Darussalam) DPMM FC
	FW	Azhari Danial Yusra	30 June 2003 (age 23)	0	0	
	FW	Baihaqi Yusop Arabimulfhasal	4 February 2005 (age 21)	0	0	(Football Association of Brunei Darussalam) Tabuan

=== Indonesia ===
Head coach: (South Korea) Shin Tae-yong

No.	Pos.	Player	Date of birth (age)	Caps	Goals	Club
1	GK	Cahya Supriadi	11 February 2003 (age 23)	5	0	(Football Association of Indonesia) Persija Jakarta
22	GK	Erlangga Setyo	16 April 2003 (age 23)	2	0	(Football Association of Indonesia) Persis Solo
23	GK	Yogi Hermawan	16 January 2003 (age 23)	0	0	(Football Association of Indonesia) Barito Putera
26	GK	Dimas Maulana	1 June 2003 (age 23)	0	0	(Football Association of Indonesia) Persis Solo
2	DF	Ahmad Rusadi	4 April 2003 (age 23)	4	1	(Football Association of Indonesia) Belitong
3	DF	Kadek Arel	4 April 2005 (age 21)	2	0	(Football Association of Indonesia) Bali United
4	DF	Muhammad Ferarri (captain)	21 June 2003 (age 23)	5	0	(Football Association of Indonesia) Persija Jakarta
5	DF	Kakang Rudianto	2 February 2003 (age 23)	2	0	(Football Association of Indonesia) Persib Bandung
12	DF	Mikael Tata	10 May 2004 (age 22)	3	0	(Football Association of Indonesia) Waanal Bintuka
16	DF	Radzky Ginting	1 December 2003 (age 22)	0	0	(Football Association of Indonesia) Persija Jakarta
19	DF	Marcell Januar	20 January 2004 (age 22)	1	0	(Football Association of Indonesia) Persis Solo
21	DF	Edgard Amping	9 June 2003 (age 23)	4	0	(Football Association of Indonesia) PSM Makassar
6	MF	Frezy Al Hudaifi	21 April 2004 (age 22)	4	0	(Football Association of Indonesia) Bhayangkara
7	MF	Marselino Ferdinan	9 September 2004 (age 22)	1	1	(Football Association of Indonesia) Persebaya Surabaya
8	MF	Arkhan Fikri	28 December 2004 (age 21)	3	0	(Football Association of Indonesia) Arema
11	MF	Ferdiansyah Cecep	15 July 2003 (age 23)	5	0	(Football Association of Indonesia) Persib Bandung
13	MF	Dimas Pamungkas	31 July 2004 (age 22)	2	0	(Football Association of Indonesia) Bhayangkara
14	MF	Raka Cahyana	24 February 2004 (age 22)	5	1	(Football Association of Indonesia) Persija Jakarta
15	MF	Zanadin Fariz	31 May 2004 (age 22)	0	0	(Football Association of Indonesia) Persis Solo
17	MF	Subhan Fajri	13 May 2003 (age 23)	2	0	(Football Association of Indonesia) Dewa United
25	MF	Rafli Asrul	19 February 2003 (age 23)	4	0	(Football Association of Indonesia) PSM Makassar
9	FW	Hokky Caraka	21 August 2004 (age 22)	4	0	(Football Association of Indonesia) PSS Sleman
10	FW	Ronaldo Kwateh	19 October 2004 (age 21)	5	0	(Football Association of Indonesia) Madura United
18	FW	Alfriyanto Nico	3 April 2003 (age 23)	4	0	(Football Association of Indonesia) Persija Jakarta
20	FW	Razzaa Fachrezi	4 June 2004 (age 22)	5	0	(Football Association of Indonesia) Persija Jakarta
24	FW	Faiz Maulana	15 June 2004 (age 22)	0	0	(Football Association of Indonesia) Bina Taruna
27	FW	Ricky Pratama	6 May 2003 (age 23)	2	0	(Football Association of Indonesia) PSM Makassar
28	FW	Rabbani Tasnim	26 May 2003 (age 23)	0	0	(Football Association of Indonesia) Borneo Samarinda

=== Myanmar ===
Head coach: Soe Myat Min

No.	Pos.	Player	Date of birth (age)	Caps	Goals	Club
	GK	Hein Htet Soe	21 June 2003 (aged 19)			(Myanmar Football Federation) Ayeyawady United
	GK	Htet Arkar Win	20 February 2004 (aged 18)			(Myanmar Football Federation) Ayeyawady United
	GK	Sai Sun Tunn Kay	16 January 2005 (aged 17)			(Myanmar Football Federation) Unknown
	DF	Lin Lin Tun	12 February 2003 (aged 19)			(Myanmar Football Federation) Unknown
	DF	Lan Sann Aung	15 January 2003 (aged 19)			(Myanmar Football Federation) Unknown
	DF	Tun Tun Thein	3 December 2005 (aged 16)			(Myanmar Football Federation) Dagon Port
	DF	Myo Min Hein	12 May 2003 (aged 19)			(Myanmar Football Federation) Unknown
	DF	Kyaw Wunna	21 March 2003 (aged 19)			(Myanmar Football Federation) Thitsar Arman
	DF	Sai Kaung Sat Paing	5 August 2005 (aged 16)			(Myanmar Football Federation) Mahar United
	DF	Khun Aung Soe	7 June 2003 (aged 19)			(Myanmar Football Federation) Unknown
	DF	Myo Min Hein	12 May 2003 (aged 19)			(Myanmar Football Federation) Unknown
	MF	Hein Zaw Naing	10 November 2005 (aged 16)			(Myanmar Football Federation) Ayeyawady United
	MF	Chit Aye	17 January 2003 (aged 19)			(Myanmar Football Federation) Dagon Port
	MF	Tharyar Win Htet	18 March 2004 (aged 18)			(Myanmar Football Federation) Yangon United
	MF	Lamin Htwe	10 March 2003 (aged 19)			(Myanmar Football Federation) Yangon United
	MF	Moe Swe	31 March 2003 (aged 19)			(Myanmar Football Federation) Yadanarbon
	MF	Ye Kaung Sat	20 January 2005 (aged 17)			(Myanmar Football Federation) Thitsar Arman
	MF	Zaw Win Thein	1 March 2003 (aged 19)			(Myanmar Football Federation) Yangon United
	MF	Oakkar Naing	18 November 2003 (aged 18)			(Myanmar Football Federation) Yangon United
	MF	Arkar Kyaw	7 February 2004 (aged 18)			(Myanmar Football Federation) Mahar United
	MF	Thu Ya Aung	23 April 2003 (aged 19)			(Myanmar Football Federation) GFA
	MF	Phyo Thant Ko Ko	19 October 2004 (aged 17)			(Myanmar Football Federation) Ayeyawady United
	MF	Ye Yint Phyo	26 July 2003 (aged 18)			(Myanmar Football Federation) Ayeyawady United
	FW	Swan Htet	12 April 2005 (aged 17)			(Myanmar Football Federation) Dagon Star
	FW	Htet Myat Lwin	20 June 2004 (aged 18)			(Myanmar Football Federation) Unknown
	FW	Thein Zaw Thiha	8 February 2005 (aged 17)			(Myanmar Football Federation) ISPE

=== Philippines ===
Head coach: Christopher Pedimonte

No.	Pos.	Player	Date of birth (age)	Caps	Goals	Club
1	GK	Lance Bencio	21 September 2003 (aged 18)	0	0	(Philippine Football Federation) Malaya
20	GK	Nathan Bata	24 January 2005 (aged 17)	0	0	(Philippine Football Federation) Kaya–Iloilo
22	GK	Alfonso Gonzalez	5 January 2003 (aged 19)	0	0	(Philippine Football Federation) Makati
2	DF	Zachary Taningco	8 October 2004 (aged 17)	0	0	(Philippine Football Federation) Great Oak Manor
4	DF	Jerome Ang	21 August 2003 (aged 18)	0	0	(Philippine Football Federation) Malaya
6	DF	Cian Galsim	13 January 2004 (aged 18)	0	0	(Philippine Football Federation) Kaya–Iloilo
12	DF	Dale Reas-Do	3 January 2003 (aged 19)	0	0	(Canadian Soccer Association) Brighton College
13	DF	Haren De Gracia	6 May 2003 (aged 19)	0	0	(Philippine Football Federation) Tuloy
14	DF	Jaime Rosquillo (captain)	10 March 2003 (aged 19)	4	0	(Philippine Football Federation) Azkals Development Team
15	DF	Eugene Tillor	15 June 2004 (aged 18)	0	0	(Philippine Football Federation) Giuseppe
5	MF	Mark Dadivas	5 May 2004 (aged 18)	0	0	(Philippine Football Federation) Mindanao State University
7	MF	Dov Cariño	18 December 2003 (aged 18)	0	0	(Football Association of Thailand) BISP Cruzeiro
8	MF	Kamil Amirul	6 February 2004 (aged 18)	0	0	(United States Soccer Federation) Altitude Rush Soccer
10	MF	Sandro Reyes	29 March 2003 (aged 19)	0	0	(Philippine Football Federation) Kaya–Iloilo
16	MF	Antoine Ortega	12 May 2003 (aged 19)	0	0	(Royal Spanish Football Federation) Badalona
17	MF	Justin Frias	24 July 2003 (aged 18)	0	0	(Football Australia) Blacktown Spartans
18	MF	Syron Saut	23 October 2003 (aged 18)	0	0	(Philippine Football Federation) Tuloy
21	MF	Harry Nuñez	16 December 2004 (aged 17)	0	0	(Philippine Football Federation) Tuloy
23	MF	Karl Absalon	17 October 2003 (aged 18)	0	0	(Philippine Football Federation) Malaya
24	MF	Dominic Tom	28 April 2004 (aged 18)	0	0	(Philippine Football Federation) Makati
26	MF	Cyrelle Saut	3 September 2005 (aged 16)	0	0	(Philippine Football Federation) Tuloy
9	FW	Andres Aldeguer	18 December 2003 (aged 18)	0	0	(Philippine Football Federation) Azkals Development Team
11	FW	John Jalique	4 February 2004 (aged 18)	0	0	(Philippine Football Federation) Tuloy
19	FW	Uriel Dalapo	8 August 2004 (aged 17)	0	0	(United States Soccer Federation) Putnam Science Academy

=== Thailand ===
Head coach: (Spain) Salva Valero

No.	Pos.	Player	Date of birth (age)	Caps	Goals	Club
1	GK	Narongsak Nuangwongsa	19 February 2003 (age 23)			(Football Association of Thailand) Buriram United
20	GK	Chommaphat Boonloet	17 February 2003 (age 23)			(Football Association of Thailand) Chonburi
23	GK	Siraset Aekprathumchai	8 April 2003 (age 23)			(Football Association of Thailand) Chainat Hornbill
3	DF	Thawatchai Inprakhon	31 March 2003 (age 23)			(Football Association of Thailand) Buriram United
4	DF	Theekawin Chansri	17 February 2004 (age 22)			(Football Association of Thailand) Assumption United
5	DF	Chonnapat Buaphan (captain)	22 March 2004 (age 22)			(Football Association of Thailand) Lamphun Warriors
13	DF	Waris Choolthong	8 January 2004 (age 22)			(Football Association of Thailand) BG Pathum United
15	DF	Bukkoree Lemdee	11 March 2004 (age 22)			(Football Association of Thailand) Chonburi
24	DF	Nathan James	28 September 2004 (age 22)			(The Football Association) Burnley
25	DF	Phon-Ek Jensen	30 May 2003 (age 23)			(Football Association of Thailand) Suphanburi
2	MF	Pornsawan Sankla	9 May 2004 (age 22)			(Football Association of Thailand) Chonburi
6	MF	Sittha Boonlha	2 September 2004 (age 22)			(Football Association of Thailand) Port
7	MF	Kakana Khamyok	21 May 2004 (age 22)			(Football Association of Thailand) Assumption United
8	MF	Kasidit Kalasin	2 July 2004 (age 22)			(Football Association of Thailand) Chonburi
12	MF	Thanawat Saipetch	27 January 2004 (age 22)			(Football Association of Thailand) Buriram United
14	MF	Seksan Ratree	14 March 2003 (age 23)			(Football Association of Thailand) Buriram United
18	MF	Sattawas Leela	17 February 2003 (age 23)			(Football Association of Thailand) STK Muangnont
19	MF	Kroekphon Arbram	19 May 2003 (age 23)			(Football Association of Thailand) Pattaya Dolphins United
16	MF	Wongwat Jaroentaveesuk	2 February 2004 (age 22)			(Football Association of Thailand) Rajpracha
21	MF	Songkramsamut Namphueng	7 November 2003 (age 22)			(Football Association of Thailand) Police Tero
22	MF	Phanthamit Praphanth	12 September 2003 (age 23)			(Football Association of Thailand) Chonburi
26	MF	Patiparnchai Phothep	21 July 2003 (age 23)			(Football Association of Thailand) Chainat Hornbill
9	FW	Panupong Wongpila	15 February 2003 (age 23)			(Football Association of Thailand) Buriram United
10	FW	Winai Aimaot	28 January 2003 (age 23)			(Football Association of Thailand) Buriram United
11	FW	Niphitphon Wongpanya	1 February 2004 (age 22)			(Football Association of Thailand) Assumption United
17	FW	Thanawut Phochai	2 December 2005 (age 20)			(Football Association of Thailand) Nongbua Pitchaya
27	FW	Nattakit Butsing	2 May 2003 (age 23)			(Football Association of Thailand) Uthai Thani

=== Vietnam ===
Head coach: Đinh Thế Nam

No.	Pos.	Player	Date of birth (age)	Club
1	GK	Hồ Tùng Hân	10 May 2003 (age 23)	(Vietnam Football Federation) SHB Đà Nẵng
23	GK	Cao Văn Bình	9 July 2005 (age 21)	(Vietnam Football Federation) Sông Lam Nghệ An
25	GK	Lê Trung Tuấn	3 February 2003 (age 23)	(Vietnam Football Federation) Thanh Hóa
2	DF	Hà Châu Phi	27 January 2003 (age 23)	(Vietnam Football Federation) Thanh Hóa
3	DF	Trịnh Hoàng Cảnh	3 May 2003 (age 23)	(Vietnam Football Federation) Sông Lam Nghệ An
4	DF	Vũ Văn Sơn	2 January 2003 (age 23)	(Vietnam Football Federation) Hà Nội
5	DF	Đặng Tuấn Phong	2 February 2003 (age 23)	(Vietnam Football Federation) Viettel
12	DF	Nguyễn Bảo Long	9 February 2005 (age 21)	(Vietnam Football Federation) Phố Hiến
19	DF	Nguyễn Văn Triệu	17 January 2003 (age 23)	(Vietnam Football Federation) Hoàng Anh Gia Lai
21	DF	Nguyễn Hồng Phúc	19 February 2003 (age 23)	(Vietnam Football Federation) Hòa Bình
27	DF	Nguyễn Nhật Minh	17 May 2003 (age 23)	(Vietnam Football Federation) Nutifood
6	MF	Phan Lạc Dương	11 November 2003 (age 22)	(Vietnam Football Federation) Hà Nội
7	MF	Nguyễn Anh Tú	18 November 2003 (age 22)	(Vietnam Football Federation) Hà Nội
8	MF	Nguyễn Văn Tú	14 May 2003 (age 23)	(Vietnam Football Federation) Viettel
10	MF	Khuất Văn Khang (captain)	11 May 2003 (age 23)	(Vietnam Football Federation) Viettel
13	MF	Nguyễn Minh Trọng	2 April 2003 (age 23)	(Vietnam Football Federation) SHB Đà Nẵng
14	MF	Nguyễn Văn Trường	10 September 2003 (age 23)	(Vietnam Football Federation) Hà Nội
15	MF	Nguyễn Đình Bắc	24 September 2004 (age 22)	(Vietnam Football Federation) Quảng Nam
16	MF	Lê Quang Văn Duyệt	11 May 2005 (age 21)	(Vietnam Football Federation) Quảng Nam
20	MF	Thái Văn Thảo	17 November 2003 (age 22)	(Vietnam Football Federation) An Giang
24	MF	Nguyễn Đức Việt	1 January 2004 (age 22)	(Vietnam Football Federation) Hoàng Anh Gia Lai
26	MF	Đinh Thành Đạt	15 March 2003 (age 23)	(Vietnam Football Federation) Hoàng Anh Gia Lai
28	MF	Nguyễn Giản Tân	29 December 2003 (age 22)	(Vietnam Football Federation) Hà Nội
9	FW	Nguyễn Quốc Việt	2 October 2003 (age 23)	(Vietnam Football Federation) Nutifood
11	FW	Tạ Việt Sơn	15 February 2003 (age 23)	(Vietnam Football Federation) Phù Đổng
17	FW	Nguyễn Nhân Nghĩa	14 May 2003 (age 23)	(Vietnam Football Federation) Đồng Nai
18	FW	Nguyễn Minh Tùng	2 January 2004 (age 22)	(Vietnam Football Federation) Quảng Nam
22	FW	Trần Quốc Đạt	23 January 2003 (age 23)	(Vietnam Football Federation) Hòa Bình

== Group B ==
=== Cambodia ===
Head coach: (Japan) Koji Gyotoku

No.	Pos.	Player	Date of birth (age)	Club
1	GK	Reth Lyheng	1 January 2004 (aged 18)	(Football Federation of Cambodia) Bati FA
21	GK	Chiem Samnang	17 June 2005 (aged 17)	(Football Federation of Cambodia) Bati FA
22	GK	Soeun Rithyvirakvathana	1 January 2004 (aged 18)	(Football Federation of Cambodia) Prey Veng
3	DF	Chhan Bunmy	9 November 2003 (aged 18)	(Football Federation of Cambodia) Ministry of Interior
4	DF	Yang Phomin		(Football Federation of Cambodia)
5	DF	Hout Vanneth	12 January 2004 (aged 18)	(Football Federation of Cambodia) Nagaworld
6	DF	Vorn Phalla	7 June 2004 (aged 18)	(Football Federation of Cambodia)
12	DF	Sonn Thavisiv	2 July 2006 (aged 16)	(Football Federation of Cambodia) Bati FA
13	DF	Tam Makara	25 January 2006 (aged 16)	(Football Federation of Cambodia) Bati FA
15	DF	Meng Sophea	3 April 2004 (aged 18)	(Football Federation of Cambodia) Bati FA
20	DF	Lao Chunghuor	3 February 2004 (aged 18)	(Football Federation of Cambodia) Nagaworld
2	MF	Uk Devin	27 September 2006 (aged 15)	(Football Federation of Cambodia) Bati FA
7	MF	Heng Sovanpanha	13 September 2004 (aged 17)	(Football Federation of Cambodia) Bati FA
8	MF	Voeun Va	7 April 2003 (aged 19)	(Football Federation of Cambodia) Prey Veng
9	MF	Eav Sovannara	1 January 2005 (aged 17)	(Football Federation of Cambodia) Bati FA
17	MF	Sorm Borith	9 April 2005 (aged 17)	(Football Federation of Cambodia) Bati FA
19	MF	Lim Aarun Raymond	25 June 2003 (aged 19)	(Football Federation of Cambodia) Kirivong Sok Sen Chey
23	MF	Sin Sovannmakara	6 December 2004 (aged 17)	(Football Federation of Cambodia) Prey Veng
10	FW	Chanvibol Davit	14 April 2004 (aged 18)	(Football Federation of Cambodia) Bati FA
11	FW	Sovan Dauna	14 April 2004 (aged 18)	(Football Federation of Cambodia)
14	FW	Kea Piseth		(Football Federation of Cambodia) Bati FA
16	FW	Vann Vit		(Football Federation of Cambodia) Asia Euro United
18	FW	Hav Soknet	3 August 2003 (aged 18)	(Football Federation of Cambodia) Asia Euro United

=== Laos ===
Head coach: (Germany) Michael Weiß

No.	Pos.	Player	Date of birth (age)	Caps	Goals	Club
1	GK	Chanthavysay Thiep Anong	9 May 2004 (age 22)			(Lao Football Federation) Ezra FC
12	GK	Phounin Xayyasone	10 January 2004 (age 22)			(Lao Football Federation) Ezra FC
2	DF	Phoutthavong Sangvilay	16 October 2004 (age 22)			(Lao Football Federation) Ezra FC
3	DF	Foutbone Kounnasen	1 May 2004 (age 22)			(Lao Football Federation)
4	DF	Anantaza Siphongphan	9 November 2004 (age 21)			(Lao Football Federation) Ezra FC
16	DF	Saleunxay Phommavong	7 August 2004 (age 22)			(Lao Football Federation)
21	DF	Vongsakda Chanthaleuxay	28 November 2004 (age 21)			(Lao Football Federation) Ezra FC
24	DF	Souliyo Inthavong				(Lao Football Federation) Lao Army
27	DF	Thilaphon Pathammavong	2 October 2004 (age 22)			(Lao Football Federation) Electricité du Laos
6	MF	Chanthavixay Khounthoumphong	17 February 2004 (age 22)			(Lao Football Federation) Savannakhet
7	MF	Khonesavanh Keonuchanh	4 June 2004 (age 22)			(Lao Football Federation) Young Elephants
8	MF	Sayfon Keohanam	11 July 2006 (age 20)			(Football Association of Thailand) Nonthaburi United
10	MF	Sinnakone Koumanykham	10 July 2003 (age 23)			(Lao Football Federation) Luang Prabang
11	MF	Phonsack Seesavath	4 October 2004 (age 22)			(Lao Football Federation)
14	MF	Lavi Somthongkham	1 April 2004 (age 22)			(Lao Football Federation) Muanghat United
15	MF	Damoth Thongkhamsavath	3 April 2004 (age 22)			(Lao Football Federation) Champasak
17	MF	Khampane Douangvilay	5 February 2004 (age 22)			(Lao Football Federation) Viengchanh
18	MF	Vongphachanh Phouthavong	26 April 2003 (age 23)			(Lao Football Federation) Electricité du Laos
19	MF	Bounpaseuth Thammakhanh	15 June 2004 (age 22)			(Lao Football Federation) Master 7
23	MF	Chanthaviphone Phoumsavanh	19 June 2006 (age 20)			(Lao Football Federation) Muanghat United
25	MF	Sonethalin Chanthavong				(Lao Football Federation)
9	FW	Sisouphonh Ackhavong	15 July 2003 (age 23)			(Lao Football Federation)
13	FW	Peter Phanthavong	15 February 2006 (age 20)			(Lao Football Federation) Ezra FC
20	FW	Athit Louanglath	18 May 2004 (age 22)			(Lao Football Federation)

=== Malaysia ===
Head coach: Hassan Sazali

No.	Pos.	Player	Date of birth (age)	Club
1	GK	Syahmi Adib Haikal	30 March 2003 (age 23)	(Football Association of Malaysia) Selangor
22	GK	Aizat Aiman	24 September 2003 (age 23)	(Football Association of Malaysia) FAM-MSN Project
23	GK	Zulhilmi Sharani	4 May 2004 (age 22)	(Football Association of Malaysia) Johor Darul Ta'zim
3	DF	Ubaidullah Shamsul	30 November 2003 (age 22)	(Football Association of Malaysia) FAM-MSN Project
4	DF	Adam Daniel	2 May 2004 (age 22)	(Football Association of Malaysia) Johor Darul Ta'zim
5	DF	Faiz Amer	15 January 2003 (age 23)	(Football Association of Malaysia) Selangor
6	DF	Alif Farhan	21 January 2004 (age 22)	(Football Association of Malaysia) Selangor
17	DF	Fakrul Fareez	31 January 2003 (age 23)	(Football Association of Malaysia) Selangor
20	DF	Adli Ahamad	12 February 2003 (age 23)	(Football Association of Malaysia) FAM-MSN Project
25	DF	Danish Irfan	10 July 2004 (age 22)	(Football Association of Malaysia) Selangor
8	MF	Haykal Danish	5 May 2005 (age 21)	(Football Association of Malaysia) Mokhtar Dahari Academy
12	MF	Ziad El Basheer	24 December 2003 (age 22)	(Football Association of Malaysia) Johor Darul Ta'zim
13	MF	Aysar Hadi (captain)	3 September 2003 (age 23)	(Football Association of Malaysia) Johor Darul Ta'zim
14	MF	Omar Raiyan	3 October 2004 (age 22)	(Football Association of Serbia) Red Star Belgrade
15	MF	Azannis Adzri	2 June 2003 (age 23)	(Football Association of Malaysia) Selangor
19	MF	Aliff Izwan	2 October 2004 (age 22)	(Football Association of Malaysia) Selangor
21	MF	Haiqal Haqeemi	11 April 2003 (age 23)	(Football Association of Malaysia) Selangor
24	MF	Adam Haikal	10 October 2005 (age 21)	(Football Association of Malaysia) Mokhtar Dahari Academy
7	FW	Najmuddin Akmal	11 January 2003 (age 23)	(Football Association of Malaysia) Johor Darul Ta'zim
10	FW	Haqimi Azim	6 January 2003 (age 23)	(Football Association of Malaysia) Kualar Lumpur City
11	FW	Haikal Sahar	22 April 2003 (age 23)	(Football Association of Malaysia) FAM-MSN Project
16	FW	Izrin Ibrahim	2 April 2004 (age 22)	(Football Association of Malaysia) Selangor
18	FW	Adam Farhan	4 March 2004 (age 22)	(Football Association of Malaysia) Johor Darul Ta'zim

=== Singapore ===
Head coach: Gareth Low

No.	Pos.	Player	Date of birth (age)	Caps	Goals	Club
1	GK	Firman Faizal	27 March 2005 (age 21)	1	0	(Football Association of Singapore) Mattar Sailors FC
13	GK	Rauf Erwan	25 April 2005 (age 21)	0	0	(Singapore) Young Lions FC
22	GK	Veer Sobti	6 May 2004 (age 22)	0	0	(Singapore) Tanjong Pagar United
2	DF	Danial Crichton	11 April 2003 (age 23)	4	0	(Singapore) Young Lions FC
3	DF	Raoul Suhaimi	18 September 2005 (age 21)	1	0	(Singapore) Young Lions FC
4	DF	Kieran Teo Jia Jun	6 April 2004 (age 22)	1	0	(Singapore) Geylang International
5	DF	Aqil Yazid	9 January 2004 (age 22)	1	0	(Football Association of Singapore) Balestier Khalsa
6	DF	Aniq Raushan	5 October 2003 (age 23)	0	0	(Football Association of Singapore) Lion City Sailors
23	DF	Farid Jafri	5 January 2004 (age 22)	1	0	(Football Association of Singapore) Mattar Sailors FC
24	DF	Syafi Hilman	11 January 2003 (age 23)	0	0	(Football Association of Singapore) Lion City Sailors
25	DF	Junki Yoshimura	20 July 2004 (age 22)	0	0	(Japan) Albirex Niigata (S)
8	MF	Izafil Yusof	27 January 2004 (age 22)	1	0	(Football Association of Singapore) Mattar Sailors FC
10	MF	Asis Ijilral	4 March 2004 (age 22)	0	0	(Football Association of Singapore) Mattar Sailors FC
15	MF	Amir Syafiz	21 June 2004 (age 22)	0	0	(Singapore) Young Lions FC
17	MF	Hilman Norhisam	24 May 2004 (age 22)	0	0	(Japan) Albirex Niigata (S)
20	MF	Glenn Ong Jing Jie	16 July 2003 (age 23)	1	0	(Football Association of Singapore) Lion City Sailors
21	MF	Ryu Hardy Yussri	20 April 2005 (age 21)	1	0	(Singapore) Young Lions FC
7	FW	Irfan Iskandar	16 August 2004 (age 22)	0	0	(Singapore) Young Lions FC
9	FW	Ilyasin Zayan	22 March 2004 (age 22)	0	0	(Football Association of Singapore) Lion City Sailors
11	FW	Khairin Nadim	8 May 2004 (age 22)	0	0	(Singapore) Young Lions FC
14	FW	Kieran Aryan	31 May 2003 (age 23)	0	0	(Football Association of Singapore) Lion City Sailors
18	FW	Zakaria Syari	31 July 2003 (age 23)	0	0	(Football Association of Singapore) Lion City Sailors
19	FW	Sham Mohamed	18 March 2003 (age 23)	0	0	(Football Association of Singapore) Lion City Sailors

=== Timor-Leste ===
Head coach: Eduardo Pereira

No.	Pos.	Player	Date of birth (age)	Club
1	GK	Pablo De Jesus	16 September 2003 (aged 18)	(East Timor Football Federation) Ponta Leste
12	GK	Filonito Nogueira	16 November 2004 (aged 17)	(East Timor Football Federation) SLB Laulara
20	GK	Marcio De Jesus		(East Timor Football Federation)
2	DF	Danilo Menezes Alves	31 May 2004 (aged 18)	(East Timor Football Federation) Aitana
3	DF	Ricardo Bianco	15 January 2006 (aged 16)	(East Timor Football Federation) Ponta Leste
4	DF	Jaimeto Soares	10 June 2003 (aged 19)	(East Timor Football Federation) Assalam
5	DF	Rivaldo Soares		(East Timor Football Federation)
13	DF	Tonito Belo		(East Timor Football Federation)
14	DF	Sandro Quintão		(East Timor Football Federation) Assalam
16	DF	João Bosco	2 March 2003 (aged 19)	(East Timor Football Federation) Ponta Leste
6	MF	Zenedine Lopez		(East Timor Football Federation)
8	MF	Edencio Soares	5 October 2005 (aged 16)	(East Timor Football Federation)
10	MF	Freteliano	9 August 2004 (aged 17)	(East Timor Football Federation) Emmanuel
15	MF	Carlos João Soares		(East Timor Football Federation)
18	MF	Olagar Xavier	18 May 2003 (aged 19)	(East Timor Football Federation) Ponta Leste
19	MF	Natalino Da Costa	3 August 2003 (aged 18)	(East Timor Football Federation) SLB Laulara
22	MF	Revelino Martins		(East Timor Football Federation)
7	FW	Luís Figo	17 May 2005 (aged 17)	(East Timor Football Federation) Ponta Leste
9	FW	Anizo Correia	23 May 2003 (aged 19)	(East Timor Football Federation) Ponta Leste
11	FW	Zenivio	22 April 2005 (aged 17)	(East Timor Football Federation) SLB Laulara
17	FW	Mário Quintão	18 March 2004 (aged 18)	(East Timor Football Federation) Emmanuel
21	FW	Alexandro Kefi	20 December 2004 (aged 17)	(East Timor Football Federation) SLB Laulara
23	FW	Cristevão Fernandes	16 January 2004 (aged 18)	(East Timor Football Federation) SLB Laulara
