= 2022 AFF U-19 Youth Championship =

Kejuaraan Remaja U-19 AFF 2022

Tournament details
- Host country: Indonesia
- Dates: 2–15 July 2022
- Teams: 11 (from 1 sub-confederation)
- Venue: 2 (in 2 host cities)

Final positions
- Champions: Malaysia (2nd title)
- Runners-up: Laos
- Third place: Vietnam
- Fourth place: Thailand

Tournament statistics
- Matches played: 29
- Goals scored: 92 (3.17 per match)
- Top scorer: (Vietnam) Nguyễn Quốc Việt (5 goals)
- Best player: (Malaysia) Aysar Hadi
- Best goalkeeper: (Laos) Phounin Xayyasone

The 2022 AFF U-19 Youth Championship was the 18th edition of the AFF U-19 Youth Championship, organised by ASEAN Football Federation. It was hosted by Indonesia during July 2022. The planned 2020 and 2021 AFF U-19 Youth Championship were cancelled due to COVID-19 pandemic. Players born after 1 January 2003 could participate in this tournament.

Malaysia beat Laos 2–0 in the final for their second title in the championship.

== Participant teams ==
There was no qualification, and all entrants advanced to the final tournament, except for the defending champions Australia. The following teams from member associations of the AFF entered the tournament:

| Team | Association | App | Previous best performance |
|---|---|---|---|
| Brunei | FA Brunei DS | 10th | Group stage (9 times) |
| Cambodia | FF Cambodia | 12th | Group stage (11 times) |
| Indonesia | FA Indonesia | 11th | Winners (2013) |
| Laos | Lao FF | 12th | Third place (2002, 2005, 2015) |
| Malaysia | FA Malaysia | 14th | Winners (2018) |
| Myanmar | Myanmar FF | 14th | Winners (2003, 2005) |
| Philippines | Philippine FF | 10th | Group stage (9 times) |
| Singapore | FA Singapore | 13th | Third place (2003) |
| Thailand | FA Thailand | 17th | Winners (2002, 2009, 2011, 2015, 2017) |
| Timor-Leste | FF Timor-Leste | 9th | Third place (2013) |
| Vietnam | Vietnam FF | 17th | Winners (2007) |

Did not enter
Australia

== Venues ==
| Bekasi | Jakarta |
|---|---|
| Patriot Candrabhaga Stadium | GBK Madya Stadium |
| Capacity: 30,000 | Capacity: 9,170 |
2022 AFF U-19 Youth Championship is located in West Java

== Group stage ==
- All times listed are WIB (UTC+7).

=== Group A ===
| Pos | Team | Pld | W | D | L | GF | GA | GD | Pts | Qualification |
|---|---|---|---|---|---|---|---|---|---|---|
| 1 | Vietnam | 5 | 3 | 2 | 0 | 12 | 3 | +9 | 11 (Note: Head-to-head results: Vietnam 0–0 Indonesia, Indonesia 0–0 Thailand, Vietnam 1–1 Thailand. Head-to-head standings: Vietnam: 2 pts, 0 GD, 1 GF; Thailand: 2 pts, 0 GD, 1 GF; Indonesia: 2 pts, 0 GD, 0 GF; Indonesia were ranked third on head-to-head goals scored. Vietnam and Thailand were tied on their own head-to-head results and were ranked on goal difference.) | Knockout stage |
| 2 | Thailand | 5 | 3 | 2 | 0 | 7 | 1 | +6 | 11 | Knockout stage |
| 3 | Indonesia (H) | 5 | 3 | 2 | 0 | 17 | 2 | +15 | 11 | |
| 4 | Myanmar | 5 | 2 | 0 | 3 | 12 | 12 | 0 | 6 | |
| 5 | Philippines | 5 | 1 | 0 | 4 | 8 | 13 | −5 | 3 | |
| 6 | Brunei | 5 | 0 | 0 | 5 | 0 | 25 | −25 | 0 | |

Source: aseanfootball.org
Rules for classification: Group stage tiebreakers
(H) Hosts
Notes:
2 July 2022
15:00

| Myanmar | 7–0 | Brunei |
|---|---|---|
| Moe Swe 15'; Zaw Win Thein 28'; La Min Htwe 30'; Chit Aye 68'; Thar Yar Win Htet 74'; Arkar Kyaw 78'; Thein Zaw Thiha 87' | Report |

GBK Madya Stadium, Jakarta
Referee: Chy Samdy (Cambodia)
2 July 2022
17:00

| Thailand | 1–0 | Philippines |
|---|---|---|
| Winai 11' | Report |

Patriot Candrabhaga Stadium, Bekasi
Attendance: 3,000
Referee: Xaypasert Phongsanit (Laos)
2 July 2022
20:30

| Vietnam | 0–0 | Indonesia |
|---|---|---|
| | Report |

Patriot Candrabhaga Stadium, Bekasi
Attendance: 10,832
Referee: Razlan Joffri Ali (Malaysia)

4 July 2022
15:00

| Vietnam | 4–1 | Philippines |
|---|---|---|
| Nguyễn Quốc Việt 4', 48'; Khuất Văn Khang 68' (pen.); Nguyễn Văn Trường 78' (pen.) | Report | Reyes 53' |

GBK Madya Stadium, Jakarta
Attendance: 50
Referee: Yaasin Hanafiah (Malaysia)
4 July 2022
17:00

| Myanmar | 0–3 | Thailand |
|---|---|---|
| | Report | Thawatchai 6'; Nattakit 24', 31' |

Patriot Candrabhaga Stadium, Bekasi
Attendance: 5,900
Referee: Muhammad Usaid Jamal (Malaysia)
4 July 2022
20:00

| Indonesia | 7–0 | Brunei |
|---|---|---|
| Hokky 2', 14', 18', 45+2'; Ronaldo 11'; Arkhan 20'; Nico 61' | Report |

Patriot Candrabhaga Stadium, Bekasi
Attendance: 4,964
Referee: Souei Vongkham (Laos)

6 July 2022
15:00

| Philippines | 1–3 | Myanmar |
|---|---|---|
| Rosquillo 30' | Report | Swan Htet 3'; Thein Zaw Thiha 7'; Zaw Win Thein 42' |

GBK Madya Stadium, Jakarta
Attendance: 50
Referee: Razlan Joffri Ali (Malaysia)
6 July 2022
17:00

| Brunei | 0–4 | Vietnam |
|---|---|---|
| | Report | Hà Châu Phi 11'; Nguyễn Giản Tân 32', 59'; Nguyễn Đức Việt 62' |

Patriot Candrabhaga Stadium, Bekasi
Attendance: 2,000
Referee: Chy Samdy (Cambodia)
6 July 2022
20:00

| Indonesia | 0–0 | Thailand |
|---|---|---|
| | Report |

Patriot Candrabhaga Stadium, Bekasi
Attendance: 17,126
Referee: Xaypasert Phongsanit (Laos)

8 July 2022
15:00

| Myanmar | 1–3 | Vietnam |
|---|---|---|
| La Min Htwe 90+3' | Report | Nguyễn Quốc Việt 3', 90'; Khuất Văn Khang 53' |

GBK Madya Stadium, Jakarta
Attendance: 250
Referee: Muhammad Usaid Jamal (Malaysia)
8 July 2022
17:00

| Thailand | 2–0 | Brunei |
|---|---|---|
| Kroekphon 45+1'; Winai 60' | Report |

Patriot Candrabhaga Stadium, Bekasi
Attendance: 1,000
Referee: Yaasin Hanafiah (Malaysia)
8 July 2022
20:00

| Philippines | 1–5 | Indonesia |
|---|---|---|
| Frias 28' | Report | Rabbani 14' (pen.), 41' (pen.), 49'; Nico 26'; Razzaa 70' |

Patriot Candrabhaga Stadium, Bekasi
Attendance: 10,768
Referee: Souei Vongkham (Laos)

10 July 2022
17:00

| Brunei | 0–5 | Philippines |
|---|---|---|
| | Report | Absalon 20'; Aldeguer 42', 65'; Dalapo 71'; Rosquillo 83' |

Patriot Candrabhaga Stadium, Bekasi
Attendance: 3,000
Referee: Chy Samdy (Cambodia)
10 July 2022
20:00

| Vietnam | 1–1 | Thailand |
|---|---|---|
| Khuất Văn Khang 76' | Report | Kroekphon 71' |

GBK Madya Stadium, Jakarta
Attendance: 300
Referee: Xaypasert Phongsanit (Laos)
10 July 2022
20:00

| Indonesia | 5–1 | Myanmar |
|---|---|---|
| Ferarri 17', 31'; Arkhan 25'; Rabbani 33'; Ronaldo 73' | Report | La Min Htwe 7' |

Patriot Candrabhaga Stadium, Bekasi
Attendance: 18,952
Referee: Muhammad Usaid Jamal (Malaysia)

=== Group B ===
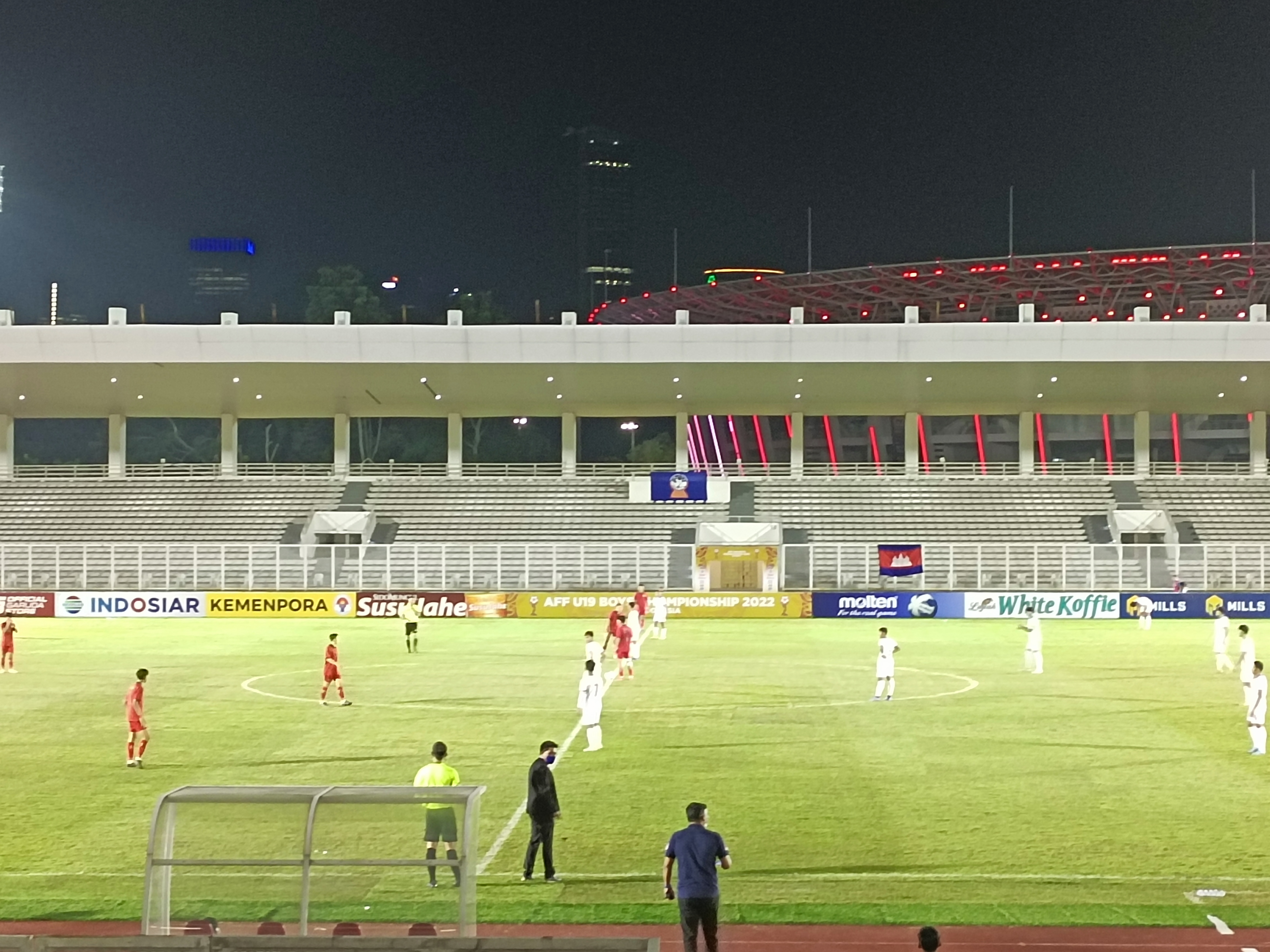
Laos v Cambodia.

| Pos | Team | Pld | W | D | L | GF | GA | GD | Pts | Qualification |
|---|---|---|---|---|---|---|---|---|---|---|
| 1 | Laos | 4 | 4 | 0 | 0 | 8 | 2 | +6 | 12 | Knockout stage |
| 2 | Malaysia | 4 | 2 | 1 | 1 | 6 | 5 | +1 | 7 | Knockout stage |
| 3 | Timor-Leste | 4 | 2 | 0 | 2 | 8 | 7 | +1 | 6 | |
| 4 | Cambodia | 4 | 1 | 0 | 3 | 4 | 8 | −4 | 3 | |
| 5 | Singapore | 4 | 0 | 1 | 3 | 1 | 5 | −4 | 1 | |

Source: aseanfootball.org
Rules for classification: Group stage tiebreakers
3 July 2022
15:00

| Timor-Leste | 0–2 | Laos |
|---|---|---|
| | Report | Damoth 39'; Phanthavong 44' |

GBK Madya Stadium, Jakarta
Attendance: 100
Referee: Kyaw Zwall Lwin (Myanmar)
3 July 2022
19:00

| Singapore | 0–1 | Cambodia |
|---|---|---|
| | | Dauna 7' |

GBK Madya Stadium, Jakarta
Referee: Aprisman Aranda (Indonesia)

5 July 2022
15:00

| Cambodia | 1–2 | Malaysia |
|---|---|---|
| Davit 56' | Report | Najmudin 13'; Haiqal 30' |

GBK Madya Stadium, Jakarta
Attendance: 50
Referee: Amdillah Zainuddin (Brunei)
5 July 2022
19:00

| Singapore | 0–1 | Timor-Leste |
|---|---|---|
| | Report | M. Quintão 59' |

GBK Madya Stadium, Jakarta
Attendance: 50
Referee: Torpong Samsing (Thailand)

7 July 2022
15:00

| Malaysia | 0–0 | Singapore |
|---|---|---|
| | Report |

GBK Madya Stadium, Jakarta
Attendance: 100
Referee: Kyaw Zwall Lwin (Myanmar)
7 July 2022
19:00

| Laos | 2–1 | Cambodia |
|---|---|---|
| Phanthavong 8', 25' | Report | Dauna 85' |

GBK Madya Stadium, Jakarta
Attendance: 50
Referee: Aprisman Aranda (Indonesia)

9 July 2022
15:00

| Laos | 3–1 | Singapore |
|---|---|---|
| Phoutthavong 6'; Sisouphon 45+2'; Chanthavixay 70' | | Khairin 89' |

GBK Madya Stadium, Jakarta
Referee: Amdillah Zainuddin (Brunei)
9 July 2022
19:00

| Timor-Leste | 3–4 | Malaysia |
|---|---|---|
| Cristevão 11'; M. Quintão 55', 76' | Report | Najmudin 8'; Farhan 15', 63'; Aliff 53' |

GBK Madya Stadium, Jakarta
Attendance: 100
Referee: Torpong Somsing (Thailand)

11 July 2022
15:00

| Cambodia | 1–4 | Timor-Leste |
|---|---|---|
| Soknet 86' | Report | Olagar 23'; Zenivio 26'; Figo 81', 90+1' |

GBK Madya Stadium, Jakarta
Attendance: 50
Referee: Torpong Somsing (Thailand)
11 July 2022
15:00

| Malaysia | 0–1 | Laos |
|---|---|---|
| | Report | Phoutthavong 66' (pen.) |

Patriot Candrabhaga Stadium, Bekasi
Attendance: 150
Referee: Aprisman Aranda (Indonesia)

== Knockout stage ==
In the knockout stage, the penalty shoot-out was used to decide the winner if necessary.

=== Bracket ===
Semi-finals
13 July – Bekasi
Vietnam | 0
Malaysia | 3
13 July – Bekasi
Laos | 2
Thailand | 0

Final
15 July – Bekasi
Malaysia | 2
Laos | 0
Third place match
15 July – Bekasi
Vietnam | 1 (5)
Thailand | 1 (3)

=== Semi-finals ===
13 July 2022
15:30

| Vietnam | 0–3 | Malaysia |
|---|---|---|
| | Report | Farhan 26'; Haiqal 70'; Danish 87' |

Patriot Chandrabhaga Stadium, Bekasi
Attendance: 150
Referee: Kyaw Zwall Lwin (Myanmar)
13 July 2022
20:00

| Laos | 2–0 | Thailand |
|---|---|---|
| Phanthavong 8'; Damoth 85' | Report |

Patriot Chandrabhaga Stadium, Bekasi
Attendance: 50
Referee: Chy Samdy (Cambodia)

=== Third place match ===
15 July 2022
15:30

| Vietnam | 1–1 | Thailand |
|---|---|---|
| Nguyễn Quốc Việt 53' | | Sittha 42' |
Penalties
| Khuất Văn Khang (penalty scored); Nguyễn Văn Trường (penalty scored); Nguyễn Nhật Minh (penalty scored); Nguyễn Văn Tú (penalty scored); Nguyễn Đình Bắc (penalty scored) | 5–3 | (penalty scored) Kroekphon; (penalty scored) Seksan; (penalty missed) Chonnapat; (penalty scored) Thanawut |

Patriot Chandrabhaga Stadium, Bekasi
Referee: Xaypasert Phongsanit (Laos)

=== Final ===
15 July 2022
20:00

| Malaysia | 2–0 | Laos |
|---|---|---|
| Faiz 13'; Aliff 76' | Report |

Patriot Chandrabhaga Stadium, Bekasi
Attendance: 200
Referee: Kyaw Zwall Lwin (Myanmar)

== Winner ==
2022 AFF U-19 Youth Championship winners

Malaysia
Second title

== Awards ==
| Most Valuable Player | Top Scorer Award | Best Goalkeeper Award |
|---|---|---|
| (Malaysia) Ahmad Aysar Hadi | (Vietnam) Nguyễn Quốc Việt | (Laos) Phounin Xayyasone |

== Goalscorers ==
There were 92 goals scored in 29 matches, for an average of 3.17 goals per match.

5 goals

- (Vietnam) Nguyễn Quốc Việt

4 goals

- (Indonesia) Hokky Caraka
- (Indonesia) Rabbani Tasnim
- (Laos) Peter Phanthavong

3 goals

- (Malaysia) Adam Farhan Faizal
- (Myanmar) La Min Htwe
- (Timor-Leste) Mário Quintão
- (Vietnam) Khuất Văn Khang

2 goals

- (Cambodia) Sovan Dauna
- (Indonesia) Muhammad Ferarri
- (Indonesia) Arkhan Fikri
- (Indonesia) Ronaldo Kwateh
- (Indonesia) Alfriyanto Nico
- (Laos) Phoutthavong Sangvilay
- (Laos) Damoth Thongkhamsavath
- (Malaysia) Najmudin Akmal
- (Malaysia) Haiqal Haqeemi
- (Malaysia) Aliff Izwan
- (Myanmar) Thein Zaw Thiha
- (Myanmar) Zaw Win Thein
- (Philippines) Andres Aldeguer
- (Philippines) Jaime Rosquillo
- (Thailand) Kroekphon Abram
- (Thailand) Winai Aimoat
- (Thailand) Nattakit Butsing
- (Timor-Leste) Luís Figo
- (Vietnam) Nguyễn Giản Tân

1 goal

- (Cambodia) Chanvibol Davit
- (Cambodia) Hav Soknet
- (Indonesia) Razzaa Fachrezi
- (Laos) Sisouphone Akkharong
- (Laos) Chanthavixay Khounthoumphone
- (Malaysia) Faiz Amer Runnizar
- (Malaysia) Haykal Danish
- (Myanmar) Arkar Kyaw
- (Myanmar) Chit Aye
- (Myanmar) Moe Swe
- (Myanmar) Swan Htet
- (Myanmar) Thar Yar Win Htet
- (Philippines) Karl Absalon
- (Philippines) Uriel Dalapo
- (Philippines) Justin Frias
- (Philippines) Sandro Reyes
- (Singapore) Khairin Nadim
- (Thailand) Sittha Boonlha
- (Thailand) Thawatchai Inprakhon
- (Timor-Leste) Cristevão Fernandes
- (Timor-Leste) Xavier Olagar
- (Timor-Leste) Zenivio
- (Vietnam) Hà Châu Phi
- (Vietnam) Nguyễn Đức Việt
- (Vietnam) Nguyễn Văn Trường

== Final ranking ==
This table will show the ranking of teams throughout the tournament.

| Pos | Team | Pld | W | D | L | GF | GA | GD | Pts | Final result |
|---|---|---|---|---|---|---|---|---|---|---|
| 1 | Malaysia | 6 | 4 | 1 | 1 | 11 | 5 | +6 | 13 | Champions |
| 2 | Laos | 6 | 5 | 0 | 1 | 10 | 4 | +6 | 15 | Runners-up |
| 3 | Vietnam | 7 | 3 | 3 | 1 | 13 | 7 | +6 | 12 | Third place |
| 4 | Thailand | 7 | 3 | 3 | 1 | 8 | 4 | +4 | 12 | Fourth place |
| 5 | Indonesia (H) | 5 | 3 | 2 | 0 | 17 | 2 | +15 | 11 | Eliminated in group stage |
| 6 | Timor-Leste | 4 | 2 | 0 | 2 | 8 | 7 | +1 | 6 | Eliminated in group stage |
| 7 | Myanmar | 5 | 2 | 0 | 3 | 12 | 12 | 0 | 6 | Eliminated in group stage |
| 8 | Cambodia | 4 | 1 | 0 | 3 | 4 | 8 | −4 | 3 | Eliminated in group stage |
| 9 | Philippines | 5 | 1 | 0 | 4 | 8 | 13 | −5 | 3 | Eliminated in group stage |
| 10 | Singapore | 4 | 0 | 1 | 3 | 1 | 5 | −4 | 1 | Eliminated in group stage |
| 11 | Brunei | 5 | 0 | 0 | 5 | 0 | 25 | −25 | 0 | Eliminated in group stage |

Source: Group stage, Knockout stage
(H) Hosts

== Controversies ==
The match between Cambodia and Laos in Group B was marked with a controversy. Cambodia's goal against Laos in the 76th minute had crossed the goal line, but Indonesian referee Aprisman Aranda did not award the goal for Cambodia. The result of the match ended with Laos' win over Cambodia with a score of 2-1.

The Football Federation of Cambodia (FFC) has officially lodged a protest with the AFF regarding this issue. Responding to Cambodia's protests, the AFF also sent a letter as an apology.

The final match of group A between Vietnam and Thailand was filled with controversy. As both teams only needed a draw with goals to advance to the semi-finals, regardless of Indonesia's win over Myanmar. The match ended with 1-1 draw, which was enough for Vietnam and Thailand to see them through to the semi-finals, and hosts Indonesia were eliminated despite having the same point and best productivity goals. This was based on the head-to-head criteria between the three teams, as per the AFF U-19 Championship 2022 Tournament Rules and Regulations.

With a score of 1-1 after 76 minutes, Vietnam and Thailand were considered not making a fair-play game. With both teams being considered slowing down the tempo of the game on purpose, after guaranteeing a spot into the semi-finals with the scores in the last 15 minutes. With the Vietnamese players only playing the ball around without being pressured by Thai players, while the Thai players were laying down with injuries despite not involving with the ball at all.

Indonesia national team coach Shin Tae-Yong criticized the AFF rules being outdated, “This tournament regulation is weird because the AFF is still using it, even though FIFA and AFC are no longer using it. So, for us being unable to qualify for the semifinals does not make sense”.

On 12 July 2022, Indonesian football governing body PSSI officially sent a letter of protest to the AFF over allegations of a match fixing between Vietnam and Thailand. With the AFF responding that there are no issues with it.
