= Trofeo Ronaldinho =

Association football friendly tournament held in Indonesia in 2022

- Location: Kanjuruhan Stadium, Malang, Indonesia
- Dates: 26 June 2022
- Teams: Arema; RANS Nusantara; Persik

Champion
- Persik

Trofeo Ronaldinho or Trofeo Meet the Star or Trofeo Nusantara was an association football exhibition tournament held at the Kanjuruhan Stadium in Indonesia on 26 June 2022. The tournament was organised by Indosiar and RANS Entertainment. Brazilian retired footballer Ronaldinho, whose the tournament was named after, also participated, playing once for RANS Nusantara in the first match against Persik.

The tournament was won by Persik.

== Teams ==
Three teams participated in the tournament:

- Arema (host)
- Persik
- RANS Nusantara

== Rules ==
Each game was played for 30 minutes. To determine the winner, a points system was used. The winning team within 30 minutes received three points and the losing team none. If the match ended in a draw, a penalty shootout was used to break the tie. The winning team of the penalty shootout got two points and the losing team one.

== Matches ==
Team 1	Result	Team 2
Persik	0–0	RANS Nusantara
Persik	4–2 (p)	RANS Nusantara
Persik	0–0	Arema
Persik	5–4 (p)	Arema
RANS Nusantara	0–0	Arema
RANS Nusantara	2–4 (p)	Arema

== Final table ==
Pos	Team	Pld	W	L	Pts
1	Persik	2	2	0	4
2	Arema	2	1	1	3
3	RANS Nusantara	2	0	2	2

== Media ==
Broadcaster	Coverage
Vidio	Streaming
RANS Entertainment	Streaming
