= Ronaldo Kwateh =

Indonesian footballer (born 2004)

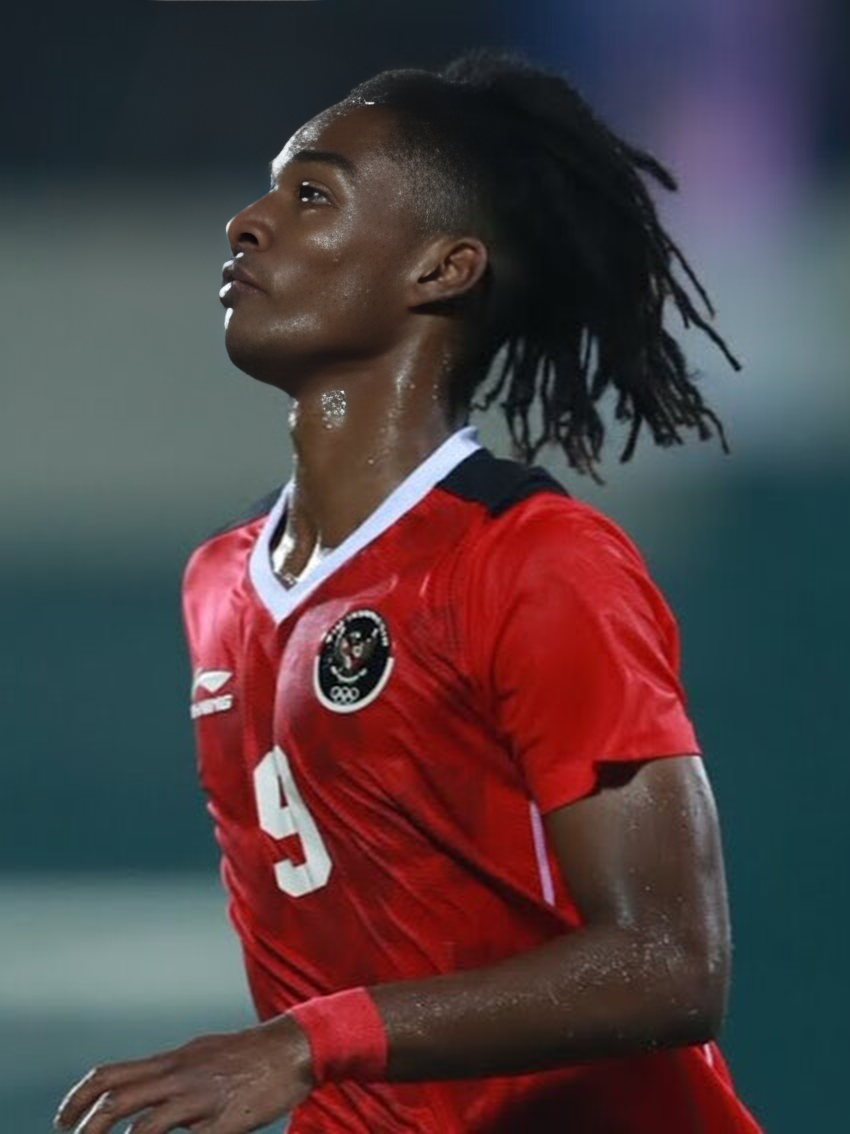
- Kwateh playing for Indonesia U23 in 2022

Personal information
- Full name: Ronaldo Joybera Junior Kwateh
- Date of birth: 19 October 2004 (age 22)
- Place of birth: Yogyakarta, Indonesia
- Height: 1.67 m (5 ft 6 in)
- Positions: Winger; forward

Youth career
- 2017–2018: SSB Pendowoharjo Bantul
- 2019–2020: Persib Bandung

Senior career*
Years	Team	Apps	(Gls)
2021–2023	Madura United	19	(1)
2023–2024	Bodrum	0	(0)
2024–2025	Muangthong United	1	(0)
2025	→ Mahasarakham SBT (loan)	0	(0)
2025–2026	Semen Padang	1	(0)

International career^{‡}
2022–2023	Indonesia U20	21	(2)
2021–	Indonesia U23	12	(1)
2022–	Indonesia	6	(0)
Medal record
Men's football
Representing Indonesia
Southeast Asian Games
Bronze medal – third place	2021 Vietnam	Team
- * Club domestic league appearances and goals as of 19 September 2025 ‡ National team caps and goals as of 21 December 2024

Ronaldo Joybera Junior Kwateh (born 19 October 2004) is an Indonesian professional footballer who plays as a winger or a forward.

== Club career ==
=== Madura United ===
He was signed for Madura United to play in Liga 1 in the 2021 season. Kwateh made his first-team debut on 3 September 2021 in a match against Persikabo 1973 at the Indomilk Arena, Tangerang. In that match, he made history by becoming the youngest player to debut in Liga 1, at that time, he appeared at the age of 16 years old, 10 months and 15 days, This achievement made him beat Mochammad Supriadi's previous record. On 12 December, Kwateh scored his first professional league goal for the club in a 1–3 lose over Bali United at Maguwoharjo Stadium.

=== Bodrum ===
On 15 February 2023, Kwateh officially joined Turkish First League side Bodrum on a permanent deal, signing a contract until June 2025.

=== Muangthong United ===
On 7 August 2024, Kwateh joined Thai League 1 club Muangthong United.

== International career ==
=== Youth ===
In October 2021, Kwateh was called up to the Indonesia U23 in a friendly match against Tajikistan and Nepal and also prepared for 2022 AFC U-23 Asian Cup qualification in Tajikistan. On 26 October 2021, Kwateh debuted in a youth national team when he came on as a substitute in a 2–3 loss against Australia U23 in the 2022 AFC U-23 Asian Cup qualification. Kwateh also was part of the Indonesia U23 team that won bronze in the 2021 Southeast Asian Games; he scored a goal in the third-place match against Malaysia.

=== Senior ===
In January 2022, Kwateh was called up to the Indonesian senior team for two friendly matches against Timor Leste in Bali by coach Shin Tae-yong. On 27 January 2022, he earned his maiden senior cap in a 4–1 win in the first of those two matches and broke the record for the youngest player to represent his country in a senior match at the age of 17 years 104 days.

After almost three years since his last called-up, Kwateh got called up to the national team for the 2024 ASEAN Championship.

== Career statistics ==
=== Club ===
As of match played 19 September 2025

Club	Season	League			Cup		Continental		Other		Total	
Club	Season	Division	Apps	Goals	Apps	Goals	Apps	Goals	Apps	Goals	Apps	Goals
Madura United	2021–22	Liga 1	11	0	0	0	–		3 (Note: Appearances in Menpora Cup)	0	14	0
Madura United	2022–23	Liga 1	8	1	0	0	–		0	0	8	1
Madura United	Total		19	1	0	0	–		3	0	22	1
Bodrum	2022–23	TFF First League	0	0	0	0	–		0	0	0	0
Bodrum	2023–24	TFF First League	0	0	0	0	–		0	0	0	0
Bodrum	Total		0	0	0	0	–		0	0	0	0
Muangthong United	2024–25	Thai League 1	1	0	0	0	–		1 (Note: Appearances in Thai League Cup)	0	2	0
Mahasarakham SBT	2024–25	Thai League 2	0	0	0	0	–		0	0	0	0
Semen Padang	2025–26	Super League	1	0	0	0	–		0	0	1	0
Career total			21	1	0	0	0	0	4	0	25	1

=== International ===
As of match played 21 December 2024

Appearances and goals by national team and year
National team	Year	Apps	Goals
Indonesia	2022	2	0
Indonesia	2024	4	0
Total		6	0

=== International goals ===
International under-20 goals

No.	Date	Venue	Opponent	Score	Result	Competition
1.	4 July 2022	Patriot Candrabhaga Stadium, Bekasi, Indonesia	Brunei	2–0	7–0	2022 AFF U-19 Youth Championship
2.	10 July 2022	Patriot Candrabhaga Stadium, Bekasi, Indonesia	Myanmar	5–1	5–1	2022 AFF U-19 Youth Championship

International under-23 goals

No.	Date	Venue	Opponent	Score	Result	Competition
1.	22 May 2022	Mỹ Đình National Stadium, Hanoi, Vietnam	Malaysia	0–1	1–1 (3–4 Penalty Shoot-out)	2021 Southeast Asian Games

== Honours ==
Indonesia U-23

- SEA Games bronze medal: 2021

== Personal life ==
Ronaldo is the son of Roberto Kwateh, a Liberian footballer who played for PSIM Yogyakarta.
