= Persik Kediri =

Association football team in Indonesia

- Full name: Persatuan sepak bola Indonesia Kediri
- Nicknames: Macan Putih (The White Tigers); Persikmania (supporters)
- Short name: PSIK, KDR
- Founded: 9 May 1950; 76 years ago
- Ground: Brawijaya Stadium
- Capacity: 10,000
Owner(s)
PT. Astar Asia Global (AAG) (founder: Arthur Irawan)
- President: Gading Marten
- Manager: Rachmad Tri Kuncara
- Coach: Marcos Reina
- League: Super League
- 2025–26: 12th of 18
- Website: persikfc.id
Home colours	Away colours	Third colours

Persatuan sepak bola Indonesia Kediri (lit. Indonesian football association of Kediri; abbreviated Persik Kediri) (pronounced [ˈpɛrːsik]), is an Indonesian professional football club based in Kediri, East Java, Indonesia. They currently compete in the Super League. The club was founded in 1950 and play their home matches at Brawijaya Stadium, located in the city of Kediri.

Persik Kediri started playing in the Indonesian League Premier Division (now Super League) in 2003. The team have the nickname White Tigers and has a motto of Djajati or Panjalu Jayati, which means Kediri Wins taken from Hantang Inscription stele. The story of the victory of Kediri Kingdom with its famous king at that time Jayabaya over Janggala is a hope for the team to strive for victory in every match. Persik Kediri is identical to the majesty jersey in purple.

== History ==
In terms of football Kediri has quite a long history. The beginning of the emergence of the sport football in Kediri started with the opening of Dutch factories employing Dutch people, who brought football to remote areas like Kediri. During the colonial era, the economy in Kediri was dominated by the Dutch, and Kediri was renowned for its sugar production. During the Cultuurstelsel era, the Kediri Residency began developing several export crops, including sugarcane. The favorable soil conditions for sugarcane cultivation contributed to the development of sugar factories in Kediri. The numerous sugar factories established by the Dutch in the Kediri area also influenced various aspects, including sports. One of the most developed sports was football. After the construction of the PG.Meritjan sugar factory by the Nederland Indische Landbouw Maatshaapl (NILM) in 1903, Dutch employees also arrived in Kediri. Initially, the Kediri community was merely spectators as the PG.Meritjan employees played football. These employees often held practice matches and when their team was short of members, they often asked the audience to join in. This was the beginning of the Kediri community's introduction to the game of football.

=== Foundation ===
Since the arrival of football in Kediri, local people have started to like this sport. Initially the Kediri people only played football when the Dutch held a soccer match, but over time the Kediri people began to play it alone without the presence of the Dutch. Football is a sport that is easily accepted by the people of Kediri because this sport is easy to play and this sport emphasizes teamwork. Football seems to be a culture among the people, football in Kediri began to develop with the emergence of soccer clubs in the Kediri area. Not only small clubs that appeared in several areas of Kediri, but in 1950 the association football club was established in Kediri, namely Persik.

In the archives of the management, the Indonesian football association of Kediri (abbreviated PERSIK) was established on 9 May 1950. The founders were the regent of Kediri, R.M. Muhammad Machin with T.H.D. Rachmat (Liem Giok Djie) and M. Sanusi. At that time Kediri still had the status of regency, there were no regional divisions, regencies, and city. With the help of Liem Giok Djie, he became a senior official of PT. Gudang Garam has something in common with Muhammad Machin in terms of football. When the two met, an agreement emerged to develop football coaching in Kediri. He first designed the team's flag which was composed of two colors. The top is red and the bottom is black with the words Persik in the middle of the two colors.

=== Mergers and acquisitions ===
On 18 August 2011, Persik merged with Minangkabau from the Liga Primer Indonesia. According to Samsul, who at that time served as the General Chairman of Persik, this policy was carried out to fulfill the legal requirements in the form of a legal entity recognized by PSSI. However, the management is dominated by Persik with the name maintained until now even though the management and legal entity have changed.

=== Club performance ===
Since the Liga Indonesia started in 1994, Persik has won 2003 and 2006 editions respectively. The club promoted to the top-tier level in 2002. In the East Java, Persik Kediri has a great name, the team was famous football club also with Arema, and Persebaya, which used to be the best derbies in East Java. The supporters of this club are called Persikmania of Man & Persik Nona of Woman.

Persik Kediri 2003 liga Indonesia Champions

Persik Kediri 2006 liga Indonesia Champions

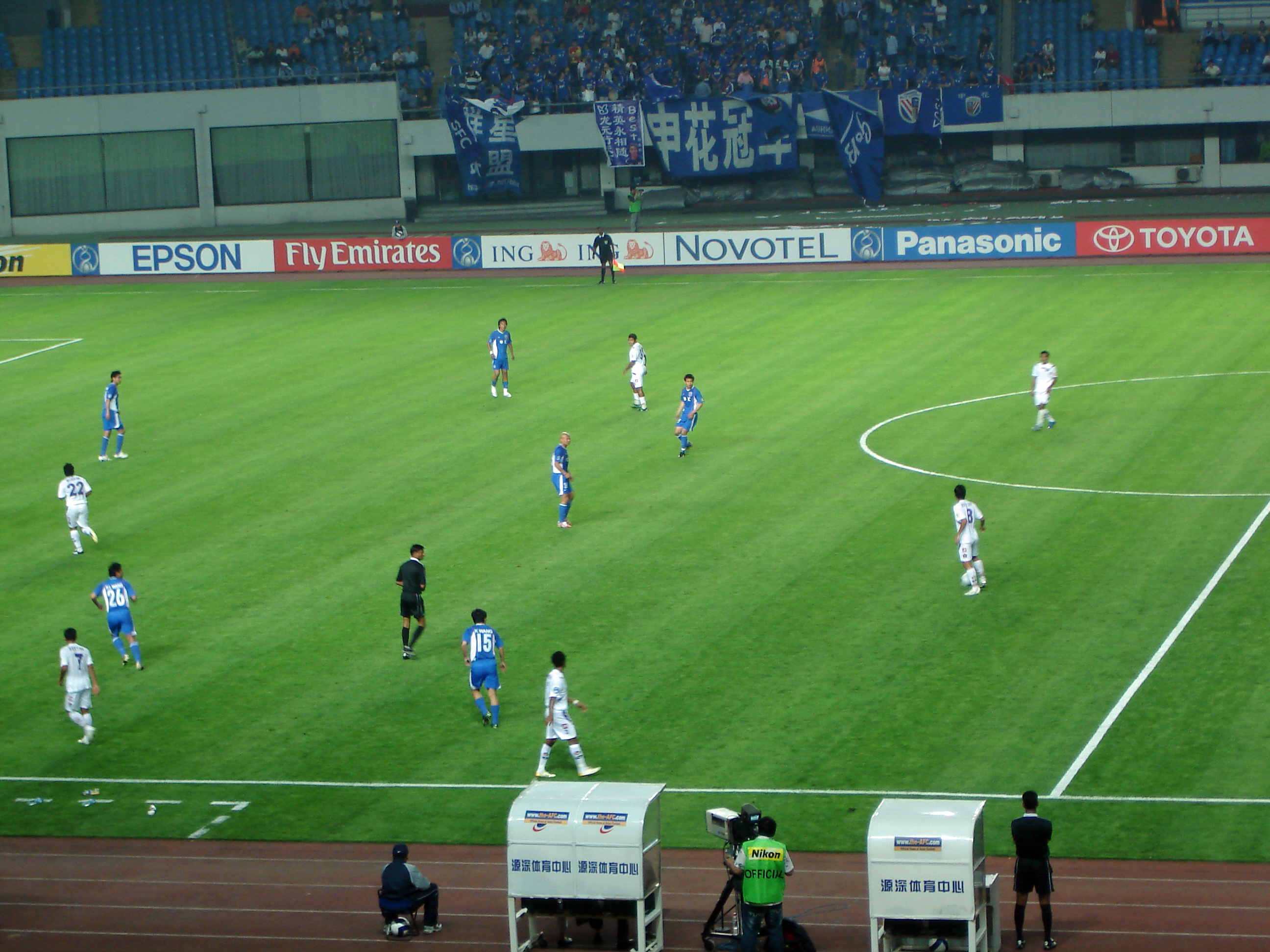
Shanghai Shenhua vs Persik Kediri at Yuanshen Stadium in 2007

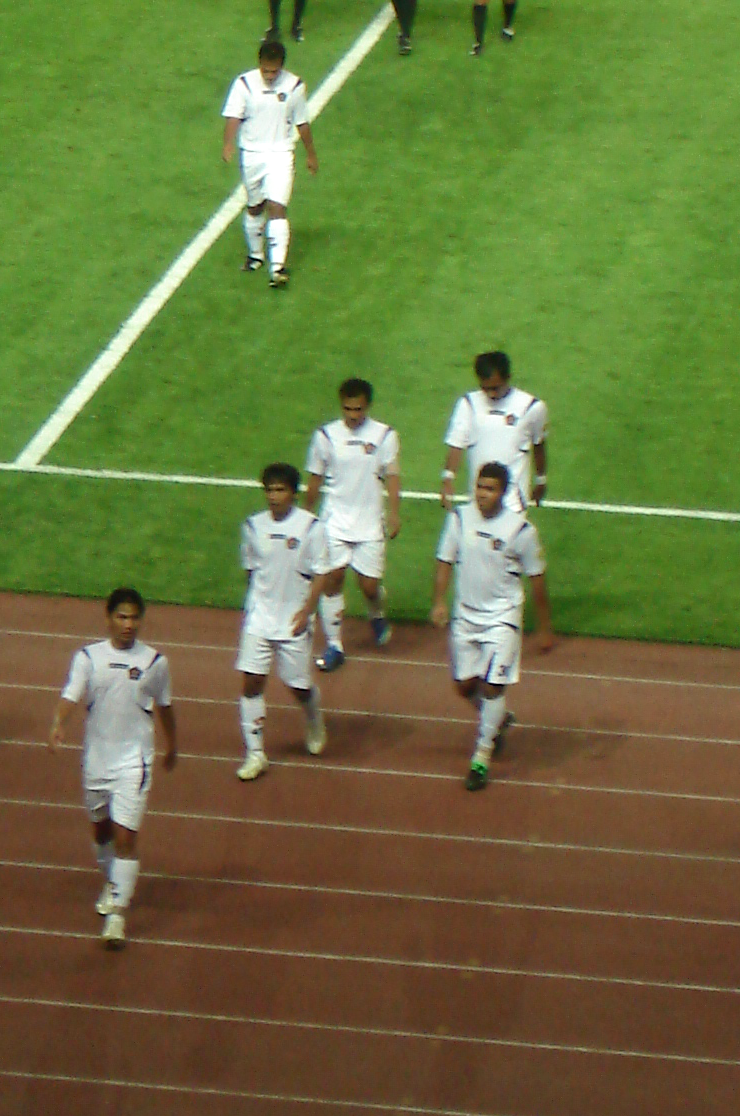
Persik players in Shanghai (2007) AFC Champions League

Persik Kediri is entitled to a ticket to play in Asian Champions League 2007 after winning Indonesian League in 2006. The Indonesian League champions were immediately confronted by three strong Asian teams. The three teams are Urawa Red Diamonds (Japan), Sydney FC (Australia), and Shanghai Shenhua (China). Persik was able to make it difficult for the club labeled as the Asian giant by putting up a fight to beat Sydney FC (2–1) and Shanghai Shenhua (1–0) at home which was then located at Manahan Stadium. In the last home match against Urawa Red Diamonds, Persik Kediri were able to force the Japanese representative to draw, Persik Kediri really gave a fierce resistance by winning 2–1 in the first half through a brace Cristian Gonzales but in the end it was equalized and ended with a score of (3–3). These results had opened Persik Kediri's hopes to qualify for the next round on the condition that they must win at home to Shanghai Shenhua. Unfortunately, in the end, Persik Kediri were eliminated due to a crushing defeat in Shanghai (0–6), Meanwhile, Urawa Red Diamonds managed to win the 2007 Asian Champions League. The failure of Persik Kediri, which at that time was strengthened by Cristian Gonazales, Ronald Fagundez, and Danilo Fernando, to qualify from the group stage because they always lost away. Even so, Persik Kediri recorded an achievement by being unbeaten at home and forced to draw with the prospective Asian championship champions.

=== Crest ===
The Persik Kediri logo is in the shape of a pentagon with red and black background colors. Inside the pentagon there are two yellow gates. This symbolizes the glory of Kediri Kingdom in the past.

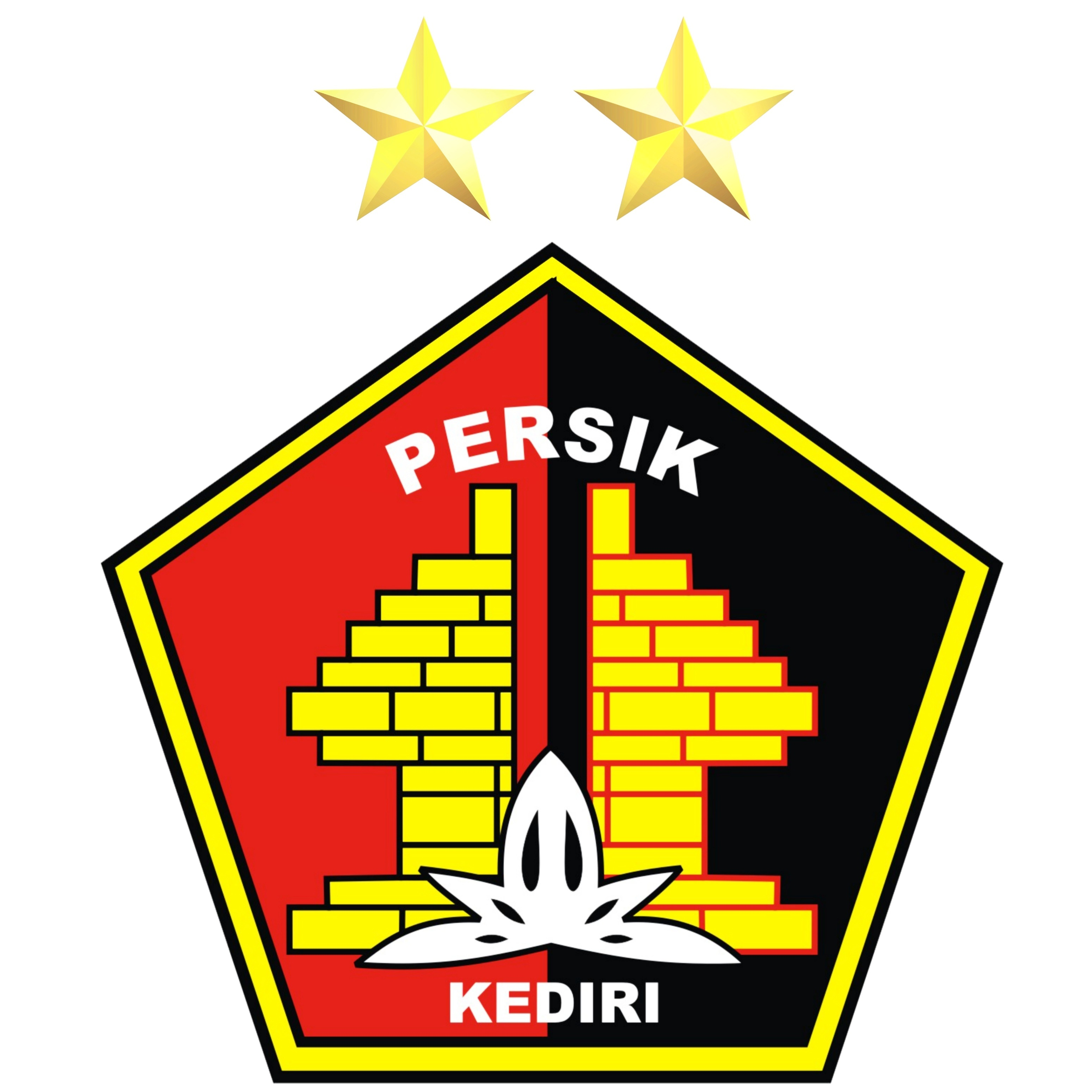
The Persik Kediri logo with two stars.

It was explained that the Kediri kingdom was very broad and rich, at that time in the world the richest countries apart from China sequentially were; Abbasid caliphate which ruled over Arab, Kediri which controlled the eastern part of the archipelago and Srivijaya Empire which controlled the western part of the archipelago. Between the two gates in the logo there is a flower symbol taken from the PSSI logo, indicating that Persik Kediri is a member of the Indonesian Football Association. Above the gate image there is the word Persik written as the team name and below the gate image there is the word Kediri written, indicating the city of origin of this club. This logo is the result of a design by a Kediri artist, named Harsono. He is also known as a teacher in this town. The two stars above it represent the two championship titles in the Indonesian League. The nickname of the White Tigers that is pinned refers to the symbol of the Kediri city government. The White Tiger is believed to be the incarnation of King Jayabaya, which until now has become a symbol of the fame of the land of Kediri. Jayabaya was the fourth king of the Kediri Kingdoms well as the most influential king in Javanese civilization.

== Players ==
=== Current squad ===
As of September 2026

Note: Flags indicate national team as defined under FIFA eligibility rules; some limited exceptions apply. Players may hold more than one non-FIFA nationality.

No.	Pos.	Nation	Player
3	DF	POR	Kiko (vice-captain)
4	MF	ESP	Imanol García (vice-captain)
5	MF	ESP	Jon Toral
6	MF	IDN	Bayu Otto (vice-captain)
7	FW	ESP	Ernesto Gómez
8	MF	IDN	Zanadin Fariz
9	FW	ESP	Sergio Castel
10	MF	IDN	Ezra Walian (captain)
11	MF	IDN	Adi Eko Jayanto
14	FW	IDN	Althaf Indie
15	DF	IDN	Dimas Pamungkas
17	MF	IDN	Riza Zidane
18	MF	IDN	Badrian Ilham
19	MF	IDN	Rendy Sanjaya
20	MF	POR	Eduardo Barbosa

No.	Pos.	Nation	Player
21	FW	ESP	José Enrique
22	MF	IDN	Dzaky Asraf
23	FW	IDN	Marselinus Ama Ola
24	DF	IDN	Yoga Adiatama
26	GK	IDN	Satrio Azhar
27	GK	IDN	Rizqi Abhirama
33	GK	IDN	Husna Al Malik
52	GK	IDN	Andhika Ramadhani
55	DF	GBS	Marcelo Djaló
68	DF	IDN	Daffa Salman
77	FW	IDN	Fransiskus Alesandro
84	DF	KOR	Park Jun-heong
97	FW	IDN	Mohammad Khanafi
98	FW	AUS	Reno Piscopo

=== Notable former players ===
The players below had senior international cap(s) for their respective countries.

- (Indonesia) Budi Sudarsono
- (Indonesia) Saktiawan Sinaga
- (Indonesia) Markus Haris Maulana
- (Indonesia) Achmad Kurniawan
- (Indonesia) Rendi Irwan
- (Indonesia) Muhammad Roby
- (Indonesia) Mahyadi Panggabean
- (Indonesia) Yongki Aribowo
- (Indonesia) Gunawan Dwi Cahyo
- (Indonesia) Erol Iba
- (Indonesia) Hamka Hamzah
- (Indonesia) Cristian Gonzáles
- (China) Zhang Shuo
- (Turkmenistan) Mekan Nasyrow
- (Liberia) Fallah Johnson

== Stadium ==
Brawijaya Stadium is home to the Persik Kediri team. filed in the middle of Kediri City, East Java. This stadium was built in 1983, and underwent improvements in 2000. Brawijaya Stadium has a seating capacity of 20,000. Brawijaya Stadium is the pride of the people of Kediri because it is in this stadium that Persik Kediri entertains its opponents.

== Mascots ==
Persik Kediri has a mascot team named Mapu, short for Macan Putih. He is an anthropomorphic tiger. Mapu along with other El-Tigre mascots always appear to accompany Persik in every match. Mapu was born on 5 September 2014, and was formally introduced at the club launch in March 2017. He and El-Tigre have become entertainment for both male and female audiences, and also hold a special place in the hearts of fans. Especially for those who often bring children to the stadium.

== Kit evolution ==
- Home

2003	2007	2010-11	2020-21	2021-22	2022-23	2023-24

- Away

2003	2007	2010-11	2020-21	2021-22	2022-23	2023-24

- Third

2003	2007	2010-11	2020-21	2021-22	2022-23	2023-24

== Season-by-season records ==
Champions	Runners-up	Third place	Promoted	Relegated

Season	Div.	Pos.	Status	Teams	East Java Governor's Cup	President Cup	Indonesia Cup	I-League Cup	AFC Champions League Two (ACL Two)	AFC Champions League Elite (ACLE)	Others
2000	L3	1st	Champion		N/A	N/A	N/A	N/A	N/A	Asian Club Championship	
2001	L2				N/A	N/A	N/A	N/A	N/A	Asian Club Championship	
2002	L2	1st	Champion	48	1st	N/A	N/A	N/A	N/A		
2003	L1	1st	Champion	20	3rd	N/A	N/A	N/A	N/A		
2004	L1	9		18	1st	N/A	N/A	N/A		Fase	
2005	L1	3 (East)		28	Not participate	N/A	Quarter-finals	N/A			Bang Yos Cup
2006	L1	1st	Champion	28	1st	N/A	3rd round	N/A			
2007–08	L1	3 (Group B)		36	Not participate	N/A	1st round	N/A		Fase-Grup	Super Copa Cup
2008–09	L1	4th	Fourth place	18	1st	N/A	2nd round	N/A			
2009–10	L1	16th	Relegated	18	2nd round	N/A	2nd round	N/A			
2010–11	L2	6 (Group 2)		39	4th	N/A	3rd	N/A			
2011–12	L2	3 (Group 2)		36	Not held	N/A	Quarter-finals	N/A			
2013	L2	3rd	Promoted	39	Group stage	N/A	Not held	N/A			
2014	L1	8 (West)		22	Not held	N/A	Not held	N/A			
2015	L1	Disqualification	Relegated	20	1st	Not participate	Not held	N/A			
2016	L2	3 (Group C)		53	Not held	Not participate	Not held	N/A			
2017	L2	3	Relegated	60	Not held	Not participate	Not held	N/A			
2018	L3	1st	Champion	40	Not held	Not participate	1st round	N/A			
2019	L2	1st	Champion	28	Not held	Not participate	1st round	N/A			
2020 †	L1	Dismissed		18	Group stage	Not held	Not held	N/A			
2021–22	L1	11th		18	Not held	Not held	Not held	N/A			
2022–23	L1	11th		18	Not held	Group stage	Cancelled	N/A			Trofeo Ronaldinho
2023–24	L1	9th		18	Not held	Not held	Cancelled	N/A			
2024–25	L1	12th		18	Not held	Not participated	Not held	N/A			
2025–26	L1	12th		18	Not held	Not participated	Not held	N/A			
2026–27	L1	TBD		18	Not held	Not participated	Not held				

Key

- Div. = Division/League
- Pos. = Position in the league
- † The 2020 season has been terminated due to COVID-19

=== Iternational friendly records ===
- JVC Cup Vietnam
  - Semifinalists: 2003
- AFC Champions League
  - Group stage 3rd place: 2004
  - Group stage 3rd place: 2007

== Continental record ==
- Asian Champions League
  - 2004: Group stage
  - 2007: Group stage

Season	Competition	Round		Club	Home	Away	Position
2004	AFC Champions League	Group G	(South Korea)	Seongnam Ilhwa Chunma	1–2	15–0	3rd
2004	AFC Champions League	Group G	(Japan)	Yokohama F. Marinos	1–4	4–0	3rd
2004	AFC Champions League	Group G	(Vietnam)	Binh Dinh	1–0	2–2	3rd
2007	AFC Champions League	Group E	(Japan)	Urawa Red Diamonds	3–3	3–0	3rd
2007	AFC Champions League	Group E	(China)	Shanghai Shenhua	1–0	6–0	3rd
2007	AFC Champions League	Group E	(Australia)	Sydney FC	2–1	3–0	3rd

== Managerial history ==
Year	Name
1999–2001	(Indonesia) Sinyo Aliandoe
2001–2005	(Indonesia) Jaya Hartono
2005–2007	(Indonesia) Daniel Roekito
2007–2008	(Moldova) Iurie Arcan
2009	(Indonesia) Aji Santoso
2010–2012	(Indonesia) Jaya Hartono
2013–2014	(Indonesia) Aris Budi Sulistyo
2014–2015	(Indonesia) Ruslan Hartono
2016–2017	(Indonesia) Kas Hartadi
2017–2018	(Indonesia) Bejo Sugiantoro
2018–2019	(Indonesia) Alfiat
2019–2020	(Indonesia) Budiardjo Thalib
2020–2021	(Indonesia) Joko Susilo
2021	(Indonesia) Budi Sudarsono
2021	(Indonesia) Joko Susilo
2021–2022	(Chile) Javier Roca
2022–2023	(Portugal) Divaldo Alves
2023–2025	(Brazil) Marcelo Rospide
2025	(Portugal) Divaldo Alves
2025	(Malaysia) Ong Kim Swee
2025–	(Spain) Marcos Reina

== Club officials ==
Position	Staff
President	(Indonesia) Gading Marten
Owner	(Indonesia) Arthur Irawan
Director	(Indonesia) M. Syahid Nur Ichsan
Advisory board	(Indonesia) Hanindhito Himawan Pramana
Technical director	(Mexico) Leonardo Medina
Head coach	(Spain) Marcos Reina
Assistant coach	(Indonesia) Johan Prasetya (Brazil) Vitor Tinoco
Physical coach	(Spain) Sergi Morera
Goalkeeper coach	(Brazil) Carlos Salomão
Team manager	(Indonesia) Rachmad Tri Kuncara
Team analyst	(Indonesia) Zulfikar
Doctor	(Indonesia) Wildan Jauhar
Physiotherapist	(Indonesia) Alfian Yoga Wiratna
Media officer	(Indonesia) Haryanto

== League & cup record ==
Domestic
League/Division	Titles	Seasons won	Runners-up	3rd place
Liga Indonesia Premier Division / Liga 1	2	2003, 2006	0	0
Liga Indonesia First Division / Liga 2	3	2002, 2019	0	2013
Liga Indonesia Second Division / Liga 3	2	2000, 2018	0	0
East Java Governor's Cup	6	2002, 2004, 2006, 2008, 2015	0	2003
Indonesia Cup	1	0	0	2010
Super Copa Indonesia Cup	1	2007	0	0

== Honours ==
=== League ===
- Liga 1/Premier Division
  - Winners (2): 2003, 2006
- Liga 2/Division 1
  - Winners (2): 2002, 2019
  - Third (1): 2013
- Liga 3/Division 2
  - Winners (2): 2000, 2018

=== Tournament ===
- Bang Yos Cup
  - Runner-up (1): 2005
- East Java Governor's Cup
  - Winners (5): 2002, 2004, 2006, 2008, 2015
  - Third (1): 2003
- Super Copa Indonesia Cup
  - Winners (1): 2007
- Indonesia Cup
  - Third (1): 2010
  - Winners (1): 2022

==== Awards ====
- Liga 3
  - Fairplay: 2018

=== eSports ===
- Indonesian eFootball Cup (IeFC)
  - Winners (1): 2023
- IFeL Invitational Series S7
  - Winners (1): 2024

== Kit suppliers ==
Years	Kits
2003	(Germany) Adidas
2004, 2006	(Indonesia) Made by club
2007–2010	(Italy) Lotto
2010–2012	(Indonesia) Specs
2013, 2016	(Indonesia) Made by club
2014	(Spain) Joma
2017	(Indonesia) Rabona
2018	(Indonesia) Fitsee
2015, 2019–2020	(Indonesia) MBB Apparel
2020–2022	(Indonesia) Noij Sportwear
2022–2023	(Indonesia) DJ Sportwear
2023–2024	(Spain) Kelme
2024–2026	(Indonesia) DRX Wear
2026–present	(Germany) Adidas

=== Sponsorship ===
Season	Kit manufacturer	Shirt sponsor	Ref.
2024–2026	DRX Wear	Athletes For Good (AFG)	
2026–present	Adidas	Athletes For Good (AFG)	

== Ranking ==
=== World clubs ranking ===
As of 14 June 2026

Current rank	Country	Club	Points
1988	(Zimbabwe)	Bulawayo Chiefs F.C.	1266
1989	(India)	Royal Wahingdoh FC	1266
1990	(Indonesia)	Persik Kediri	1266
1991	(Angola)	Atlético Sport Aviação	1266
1992	(Morocco)	AS Salé	1266

=== AFC clubs ranking ===
As of 14 June 2026

Current rank	Country	Club	Points
231	(Lebanon)	Jwaya SC	1266
232	(India)	Royal Wahingdoh FC	1266
233	(Indonesia)	Persik Kediri	1266
234	(Iraq)	Al-Shorta SC	1265
235	(Indonesia)	Persiba Balikpapan	1264

=== National clubs ranking ===
As of 14 June 2026

Current rank	Club	Points
14	Madura United	1277
15	Persiwa Wamena	1271
16	Persik Kediri	1266
17	Persiba Balikpapan	1264
18	PSIM Yogyakarta	1264
