= Rabbani Tasnim =

Indonesian footballer

Personal information
- Full name: Rabbani Tasnim Siddiq
- Date of birth: 26 May 2003 (age 23)
- Place of birth: Bekasi, Indonesia
- Height: 1.85 m (6 ft 1 in)
- Position: Forward

Team information
- Current team: Persikota Tangerang
- Number: 19

Youth career
- 2018–2021: SKO Rangunan

Senior career*
Years	Team	Apps	(Gls)
2021–2024	Borneo Samarinda	0	(0)
2023–2024	→ RANS Nusantara (loan)	2	(0)
2024–2025	Persipal Palu	8	(1)
2025–2026	Persela Lamongan	7	(0)
2026–	Persikota Tangerang	0	(0)

International career^{‡}
2022–2023	Indonesia U20	16	(8)
2021	Indonesia U23	1	(0)
- * Club domestic league appearances and goals as of 25 April 2026 ‡ National team caps and goals as of 7 March 2023

Rabbani Tasnim Siddiq (born 26 May 2003) is an Indonesian professional footballer who plays as a forward for Liga Nusantara club Persikota Tangerang.

== Club career ==
=== Borneo Samarinda ===
He signed for Borneo Samarinda to play in Liga 1 in the 2021 season. Rabbani made his professional league debut on 27 March 2021 in a match against Persija Jakarta at the Kanjuruhan Stadium, Malang in the 2021 Menpora Cup.

== International career ==
On 2 July 2022, Rabbani made his debut as a substitute for the Indonesia U-20 team in a 2022 AFF U-19 Youth Championship group match against Vietnam U-20 in a 0–0 draw. Six days later, Rabbani scored a hattrick against Philippines U-20, which Indonesia won 5–1.

Rabbani was later called again for the 2023 AFC U-20 qualifiers. He scored for all 3 matches: against Timor-Leste U-20, Hong Kong U-20, and Vietnam U-20.

After the AFC U-20 qualifiers, Rabbani was called up for the training camp in Turkey and Spain. He scored a goal against Moldova U-19 in a friendly match on 1 November 2022.

In January 2023, Rabbani was called up by Shin Tae-Yong to the Indonesia under-20 team for the training centre in preparation for 2023 AFC U-20 Asian Cup.

== Career statistics ==
=== Club ===
As of 25 April 2026.

Club	Season	League			Cup		Continental		Other		Total	
Club	Season	Division	Apps	Goals	Apps	Goals	Apps	Goals	Apps	Goals	Apps	Goals
Borneo Samarinda	2021–22	Liga 1	0	0	0	0	–		1 (Note: Appearances in Menpora Cup)	0	1	0
Borneo Samarinda	2022–23	Liga 1	0	0	0	0	–		0	0	0	0
RANS Nusantara (loan)	2023–24	Liga 1	2	0	0	0	–		0	0	2	0
Persipal Palu	2024–25	Liga 2	8	1	0	0	–		0	0	8	1
Persela Lamongan	2025–26	Liga 2	7	0	0	0	–		0	0	7	0
Career total			18	1	0	0	0	0	1	0	19	1

=== International goals ===
International under-20 goals

No.	Date	Venue	Opponent	Score	Result	Competition
1.	8 July 2022	Patriot Candrabhaga Stadium, Bekasi, Indonesia	Philippines	1–0	5–1	2022 AFF U-19 Youth Championship
2.	8 July 2022	Patriot Candrabhaga Stadium, Bekasi, Indonesia	Philippines	3–1	5–1	2022 AFF U-19 Youth Championship
3.	8 July 2022	Patriot Candrabhaga Stadium, Bekasi, Indonesia	Philippines	4–1	5–1	2022 AFF U-19 Youth Championship
4.	10 July 2022	Patriot Candrabhaga Stadium, Bekasi, Indonesia	Myanmar	4–1	5–1	2022 AFF U-19 Youth Championship
5.	14 September 2022	Gelora Bung Tomo Stadium, Surabaya, Indonesia	Timor-Leste	4–0	4–0	2023 AFC U-20 Asian Cup qualification
6.	16 September 2022	Gelora Bung Tomo Stadium, Surabaya, Indonesia	Hong Kong	1–0	5–1	2023 AFC U-20 Asian Cup qualification
7.	18 September 2022	Gelora Bung Tomo Stadium, Surabaya, Indonesia	Vietnam	3–2	3–2	2023 AFC U-20 Asian Cup qualification
8.	1 November 2022	Manavgat Atatürk Stadium, Manavgat, Turkey	Moldova	1–1	3–1	Friendly
