= Nguyễn Đức Việt =

Vietnamese footballer (born 2004)

Personal information
- Full name: Nguyễn Đức Việt
- Date of birth: 1 January 2004 (age 22)
- Place of birth: Ho Chi Minh City, Vietnam
- Height: 1.74 m (5 ft 9 in)
- Position: Midfielder

Team information
- Current team: Ninh Bình
- Number: 14

Youth career
- 2015–2021: Hoàng Anh Gia Lai

Senior career*
Years	Team	Apps	(Gls)
2021–2024	Hoàng Anh Gia Lai	36	(0)
2021	→ Tiền Giang (loan)	1	(0)
2024–	Ninh Bình	3	(0)
2026	→ Hồng Lĩnh Hà Tĩnh (loan)	11	(0)

International career^{‡}
2020–2023	Vietnam U20	10	(1)
2022–2025	Vietnam U23	20	(0)
Medal record
Men's football
Representing Vietnam
AFF U-19 Youth Championship
Third place	Indonesia 2022
AFF U-23 Championship
Winner	Thailand 2023
- * Club domestic league appearances and goals as of 7 June 2026 ‡ National team caps and goals as of 3 May 2023

Nguyễn Đức Việt (born 1 January 2004) is a Vietnamese professional footballer who plays as a midfielder for V.League 1 club Ninh Bình.

== Club career ==
Born in Ho Chi Minh City, Đức Việt started his youth career in 2015 when he got admitted to the Hoàng Anh Gia Lai – Arsenal JMG Academy. Đức Việt was promoted by coach Kiatisuk Senamuang to the first team of Hoàng Anh Gia Lai for the 2021 V.League 1 season but he was after shortly loaned to Tiền Giang to play in the 2021 Vietnamese League Two. Đức Việt only made one appearance there after the league was cancelled due to the difficult COVID-19 situation in Vietnam.

He made his professional debut on 6 March 2022, in Hoàng Anh Gia Lai's 0–2 V.League 1 defeat against Sông Lam Nghệ An. He became the first 2004 born player in the history to appear in a V.League 1 match.

In October 2024, Đức Việt was signed by Phù Đổng Ninh Bình alongside his teammate Nguyễn Quốc Việt and Lê Minh Bình.

At the beginning of 2026, Đức Việt joined Hồng Lĩnh Hà Tĩnh on loan due to lack of game time at Ninh Bình.

== International career ==
Đức Việt participated in the 2022 AFF U-19 Youth Championship and scored one goal in the group stage game against Brunei U19. Vietnam U19 finished the tournament in the third place.

Đức Việt was included in Vietnam national under-20 team's squad for the 2023 AFC U-20 Championship. He appeared in all three group stage matches but Vietnam failed to reach the knockout stage despite having won two out of their three matches.

In April 2023, Đức Việt was named on Vietnam U22's preliminary squad for the 2023 SEA Games but wasn't named in the final squad. Later in the year, he featured in Vietnam U23's squad that win the 2023 AFF U-23 Championship.

== Honours ==
Phù Đổng Ninh Bình

- V.League 2: 2024–25

Vietnam U19

- AFF U-19 Youth Championship third place: 2022

Vietnam U23

- AFF U-23 Championship: 2023

Individual

- Vietnamese National U-21 Championship best player: 2024
