= Hà Châu Phi =

Vietnamese footballer (born 2003)

Personal information
- Full name: Hà Châu Phi
- Date of birth: 27 January 2003 (age 23)
- Place of birth: Thanh Hóa, Vietnam
- Height: 1.75 m (5 ft 9 in)
- Position: Right-back

Team information
- Current team: Hoàng Anh Gia Lai (on loan from Ninh Bình)
- Number: 3

Youth career
- 2020–2023: Thanh Hóa

Senior career*
Years	Team	Apps	(Gls)
2023–2025	Đông Á Thanh Hóa	11	(0)
2023	→ Phú Thọ (loan)	13	(1)
2023–2024	→ Trường Tươi Bình Phước (loan)	14	(0)
2025-	Ninh Bình	0	(0)
2025–2026	→ Xuân Thiện Phú Thọ (loan)	21	(1)
2026–	→ Hoàng Anh Gia Lai (loan)	0	(0)

International career
2022–2023	Vietnam U20	3	(1)
2024	Vietnam U23	1	(0)
Medal record
Men's football
Representing Vietnam
AFF U-19 Youth Championship
Third place	Indonesia 2022
- * Club domestic league appearances and goals as of 6 June 2026

Hà Châu Phi (born 27 January 2003) is a Vietnamese professional footballer who plays as a right-back for V.League 1 club Hoàng Anh Gia Lai, on loan from Ninh Bình.

== Club career ==
Born in Thanh Hóa, Châu Phi was a product of the Thanh Hóa FC academy. He began his professional career in 2023, being loaned to V.League 2 side Phú Thọ. There, he made 13 appearances in the 2023 V.League 2 and scored a goal.

In the following season, Châu Phi joined Trường Tươi Bình Phước on loan. He made 14 league appearances as the club finished 3rd in the league. He was therefore named in the league's Team of the season.

== International career ==
In June 2022, Châu Phi was part of the Vietnam under-19s squad that finished third in the AFF U-19 Youth Championship, scoring a goal against Brunei during the group stage.

== Honours ==
Vietnam U19

- AFF U-19 Youth Championship third place: 2022
