= Dimas Pamungkas =

Indonesian footballer (born 2004)

Personal information
- Full name: Dimas Juliono Pamungkas
- Date of birth: 31 July 2004 (age 22)
- Place of birth: Tasikmalaya, Indonesia
- Height: 1.74 m (5 ft 9 in)
- Position: Left-back

Team information
- Current team: Persik Kediri
- Number: 15

Youth career
- 2019–2020: Persib Bandung

Senior career*
Years	Team	Apps	(Gls)
2021–2022	Persib Bandung	0	(0)
2022–2024	Bhayangkara	16	(0)
2024–2025	Adhyaksa	18	(0)
2025	Persiraja Banda Aceh	9	(0)
2026	Persela Lamongan	6	(0)
2026–	Persik Kediri	1	(0)

International career
2019–2020	Indonesia U16	6	(0)
2022–2023	Indonesia U20	16	(0)
Medal record
Men's football
Representing Indonesia
AFF U-16 Youth Championship
Third place	2019 Thailand
- * Club domestic league appearances and goals as of 11 September 2026

Dimas Juliono Pamungkas (born 31 July 2004) is an Indonesian professional footballer who plays as a left-back for Super League club Persik Kediri.

== Club career ==
=== Bhayangkara ===
He was signed for Bhayangkara to play in Liga 1 in the 2022 season. Dimas made his league debut on 8 December 2022 in a match against Bali United at the Manahan Stadium, Surakarta.

=== Persiraja Banda Aceh ===
In 2025, Dimas joined Persiraja Banda Aceh to compete in the 2025–26 Liga 2 season. He made 8 league appearances for the club before departing during the mid-season transfer window.

=== Persela Lamongan ===
On 16 January 2026, it was announced that Dimas had officially signed for Persela Lamongan. He was registered as part of the club's mid-season reinforcements alongside several other players to strengthen the squad for the second round of the league.

== International career ==
On 30 May 2022, Dimas made his debut for an Indonesian U20 team against a Venezuela U-20 squad in the 2022 Maurice Revello Tournament in France. In October 2022, it was reported that Kakang received a call-up from the Indonesia U-20 for a training camp, in Turkey and Spain.

== Career statistics ==
=== Club ===
As of 11 September 2026

Club	Season	League		Cup		Continental		Other		Total	
Club	Season	Apps	Goals	Apps	Goals	Apps	Goals	Apps	Goals	Apps	Goals
Persib Bandung	2021–22	0	0	0	0	0	0	0	0	0	0
Bhayangkara	2022–23	7	0	0	0	0	0	0	0	7	0
Bhayangkara	2023–24	9	0	0	0	0	0	0	0	9	0
Adhyaksa	2024–25	18	0	0	0	–		0	0	18	0
Persiraja Banda Aceh	2025–26	9	0	0	0	–		0	0	9	0
Persela Lamongan	2025–26	6	0	0	0	–		0	0	6	0
Persik Kediri	2026–27	1	0	0	0	–		0	0	1	0
Career total		50	0	0	0	0	0	0	0	50	0

== Honours ==
=== International ===
Indonesia U-16

- AFF U-16 Youth Championship third place: 2019
