= Brighton College (Canada) =

- Type: Private
- Established: 2000
- Location: Burnaby, British Columbia, Canada
- Website: brightoncollege.com

Brighton College Canadian career college with two campus locations in Burnaby, British Columbia, Crystal Mall Campus and Metropointe Campus. Accredited by PTIB and BC EQA, the college specializes in career training in business, AutoCAD, engineering, construction, information technology, international trade, accounting, office administration and hospitality.

== History ==
Brighton College was established in the year 2000 under the name Vancouver Central College. At this time, the college offered programs in accounting, information technology and business administration. Since then, the college has added more programs to align with the job market demands in Canada. In 2011, Vancouver Central College re-branded to Brighton College.

== Career services ==
The career services department assists students inquiring about practicum and co-op opportunities at relevant companies for their work experience placement.

== Programs ==
- AutoCAD Design and Drafting
- Architecture and Green Building Design
- Construction Supervision and Management
- Civil and Structural Engineering Technology
- Business Management
- Advanced Business Management Specialty
- Office Administration
- Hospitality Management
- Accounting Payroll Administration
- International Trade and Freight Forwarding
- Information Technology

== Affiliations ==
- PTIB (Private Training Institutions Branch) – Designated Institution
- BC EQA (British Columbia Education Quality Assurance) – Designated Institution
- FITT (Forum for International Trade Training) – Platinum Accredited Partner
- CIFFA (Canadian International Freight Forwarders Association) – Certified Partner
- ASTTBC (Applied Science Technologists and Technicians of British Columbia) – Program Accreditation
- CPA (Canadian Payroll Association) – Certified Partner
- American Hotel & Lodging Educational Institute (AHLEI) – Academic Partner
- Microsoft IT Academy (ITA)

== See also ==
- List of colleges in British Columbia
- List of colleges in Canada
- Higher education in Canada
