= Uriel Dalapo =

Filipino footballer

Personal information
- Full name: Uriel Reyes Dalapo
- Date of birth: August 8, 2004 (age 22)
- Place of birth: Kidapawan, Cotabato, Philippines
- Height: 1.73 m (5 ft 8 in)
- Positions: Winger; forward

Team information
- Current team: Davao Aguilas
- Number: 11

Youth career
- 2018–2019: Ateneo de Davao
- 2022: Putnam Science Academy

Senior career*
| Years | Team | Apps | (Gls) |
| 2022–2023 | Azkals Development Team | 0 | (0) |
| 2023– | Davao Aguilas | 17 | (4) |

International career^{‡}
| 2019 | Philippines U15 | 8 | (2) |
| 2022 | Philippines U19 | 5 | (1) |
| 2024– | Philippines | 3 | (0) |
- * Club domestic league appearances and goals as of 4:36, September 13, 2024 (UTC) ‡ National team caps and goals as of 18:25, December 21, 2024 (UTC)

Uriel Reyes Dalapo (born 8 August 2004) is a Filipino professional footballer who plays as a winger or a forward for Philippines Football League club Davao Aguilas and the Philippines national team.

== Youth career ==
Dalapo was born in Kidapawan in the province of Cotabato, Philippines. In his youth, he played winger for the football and futsal teams of Ateneo de Davao, and also represented his province at various PFF Youth Championships. He briefly moved to the United States, playing football for Putnam Science Academy until 2022.

== Club career ==
=== ADT ===
Dalapo signed his first contract with a pro team after joining the Azkals Development Team in preparation for the 2023 SEA Games and the 2022–23 Philippines Football League. However, he didn't make an appearance that season, with the ADT withdrawing from the league in May 2023.

=== Davao Aguilas ===
In 2023, Dalapo signed for Davao Aguilas, a former PFL club who were competing in the Copa Paulino Alcantara. He made his debut and scored for the club in a 5–0 win over Tuloy, coming off the bench. Davao made a run to the final, but lost to Kaya–Iloilo on penalties.

Davao returned for the 2024 edition of the PFL the next year, with Dalapo retained by Davao coach Aber Ruzgal. He was an integral part of the team's attacking core that year, scoring 4 goals, the most notable being a late winner in a 1–0 win over Stallion Laguna.

== International career ==
=== Philippines U17 ===
In July 2019, Dalapo was called up to represent the Philippines at the 2019 AFF U15 Championships in Chonburi, Thailand. He made his debut in the first matchday as the Philippines lost to Timor-Leste, coming off the bench for John Lloyd Jalique. He was called up once more for the 2020 AFC U16 Championship qualifiers, where he scored the game winner against Brunei.

=== Philippines U19 ===
For the 2022 edition of the AFF U19 Championship, Dalapo was called up for the Philippine national under-19 team. He appeared in all 5 matches for the team, scoring his first goal in a 5–0 win over Brunei.

=== Philippines ===
In September 2022, Dalapo was called up to the Philippine senior team for the first time, having previously attended a Manila-based training camp. He was part of the Philippines' squad for the 2024 Merdeka Cup, replacing John-Patrick Strauß. He made his debut in a 1–1 draw with Tajikistan, where the Philippines lost on penalties.
