= Jaime Rosquillo =

Filipino footballer

Personal information
- Full name: Jaime Domingo Rosquillo
- Date of birth: March 10, 2003 (age 23)
- Place of birth: Barotac Nuevo, Philippines
- Height: 1.84 m (6 ft 0 in)
- Position: Centre-back

Team information
- Current team: Cebu
- Number: 14

Youth career
- Barotac Nuevo National; Comprehensive High School

Senior career*
Years	Team	Apps	(Gls)
2021–2022	Dynamic Herb Cebu	3	(0)
2022–2023	Azkals Development Team	10	(2)
2023–	Dynamic Herb Cebu	37	(6)

International career^{‡}
2018	Philippines U17	4	(0)
2019–2022	Philippines U19	11	(2)
2022–	Philippines U23	13	(0)
2026–	Philippines	3	(0)
- * Club domestic league appearances and goals as of 05:15, March 11, 2026 (UTC) ‡ National team caps and goals as of 16:04, 22 September 2026 (UTC)

Jaime Domingo Rosquillo (born 10 March 2003) is a Filipino professional footballer who plays as a centre-back for Philippines Football League club Dynamic Herb Cebu and the Philippines national team. He is known for his aggressive play-style and commitment.

== Personal life ==
Rosquillo was born in Barotac Nuevo, Iloilo. He attended Barotac Nuevo National Comprehensive High School, and played on the school's football team. In 2019, he was part of the Western Visayas Regional Athletic Association team that won gold medal for football at the 2019 edition of the Palarong Pambansa, scoring a goal in the final. He was named the tournament's Most Valuable Player and Best Defender.

== Club career ==
=== Dynamic Herb Cebu ===
Though approached by colleges in Metro Manila, Rosquillo chose to play professional football for PFL side Dynamic Herb Cebu, with his transfer being confirmed in early August 2021, as the club announced its intent to participate in the upcoming season of the Copa Paulino Alcantara. Rosquillo played in Cebu's first-ever match, a 1–0 loss to Stallion Laguna. Cebu went on to finish 4th overall.

=== Azkals Development Team ===
In March 2022, Rosquillo signed for the Azkals Development Team on loan from Cebu as part of the team's preparation for the 2021 Southeast Asian Games and 2022 AFF U-23 Championship. He stayed with them for the 2022–23 edition of the PFL and was named vice-captain, although his stint was cut short in early 2023 when he temporarily left the team to continue his high school studies. However, plans to rejoin the team hit a road block when the ADT announced their withdrawal from the league.

=== Return to Cebu ===
On August 16, 2023, Cebu announced that Rosquillo had resigned with them, since the club were to be competing in the AFC Cup for the first time.

== International career ==
=== Philippines U17 ===
In 2018, Rosquillo was called up to the national under-17 team to participate in the 2018 AFF U-16 Youth Championship held in Surabaya, Indonesia. He made his first appearance in a 5–1 loss to Cambodia in the starting XI and scored an own goal against Timor-Leste, as the Philippines finished last.

=== Philippines U19 ===
Rosquillo first represented the national under-19 team in the 2019 AFF U-18 Youth Championship in Ho Chi Minh City, Vietnam. Three years later, he returned to captain the team in the 2022 AFF U-19 Youth Championship and 2023 AFC U-20 Asian Cup qualifiers, with the Philippines suffering a heartbreaking late loss to Thailand. In their last match, however, the team would pull off a 1–0 win against Afghanistan.

=== Philippines U23 ===
After his performances for Cebu in the Copa, Rosquillo was called up for the Philippines in the 2022 AFF U-23 Championship. He was also in the squad for the 2023 Southeast Asian Games as the Philippines held powerhouse Vietnam to a 0–0 draw, with Rosquillo being a member of the backline. In 2023, upon his return to the U23 team, he captained the team in the 2023 AFF U-23 Championship, getting a red card against Laos.

=== Philippines ===
In November 2022, Rosquillo was named in the provisional squad for the Philippines' senior national team ahead of the 2022 AFF Championship. He did not make the final roster.

== Career statistics ==
=== International ===
As of match played 8 August 2026

Appearances and goals by national team and year
National team	Year	Apps	Goals
Philippines	2026	2	0
Total		2	0
