= Patriot Stadium (Indonesia) =

Stadium in Bekasi, Indonesia

Patriot Candrabhaga Stadium
- Stadion Patriot Candrabhaga
- Patriot Bekasi Stadium; Patriot Stadium
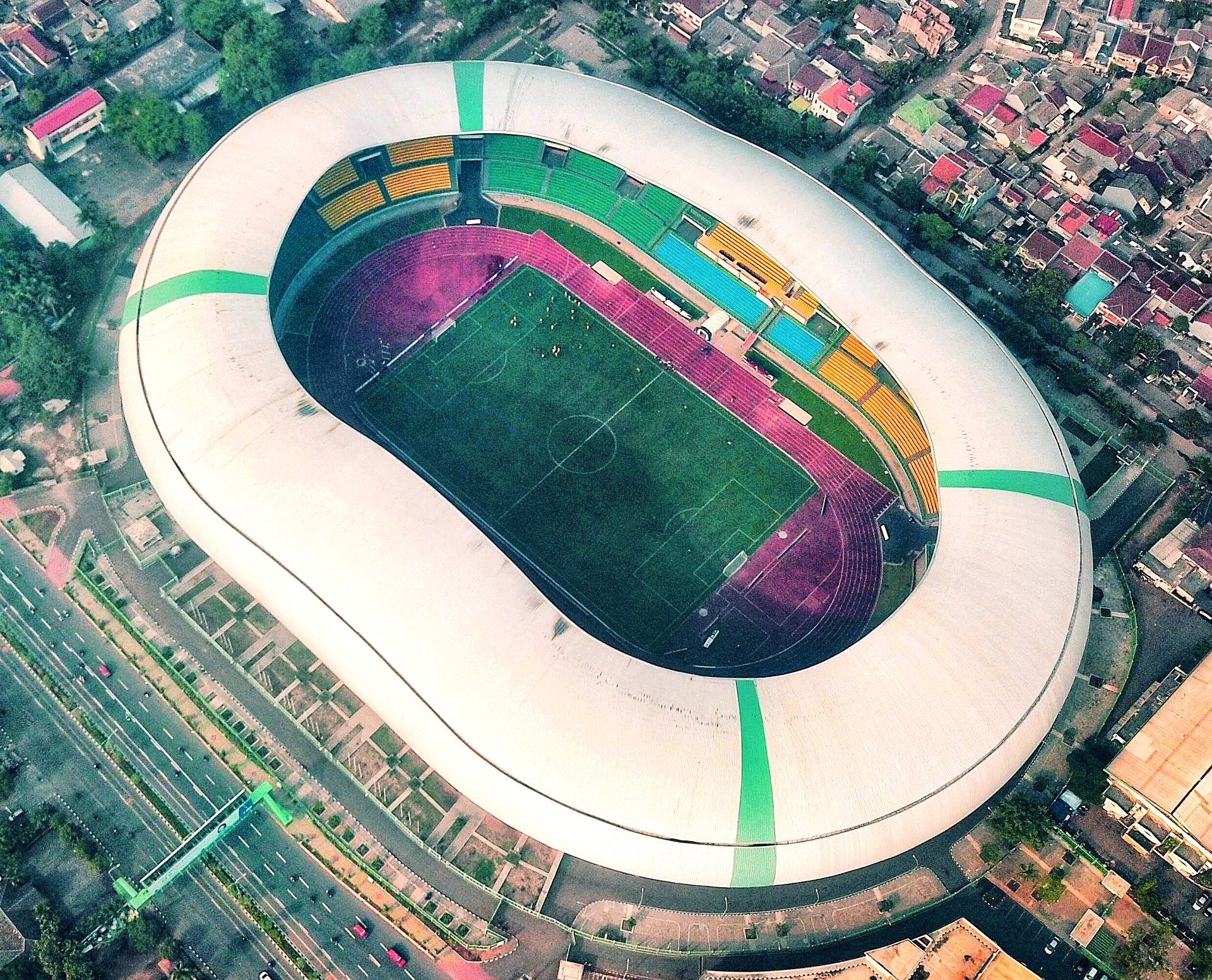
- Patriot Stadium in 2017

- Location in Bekasi
- Former names: Bekasi Stadium
- Location: Bekasi, West Java, Indonesia
- Coordinates: 6.238358°S 106.991897°E
- Owner: Government of Bekasi
- Operator: Government of Bekasi
- Capacity: 30,000
- Public transit: Bekasi

Construction
- Built: 1980 (as Bekasi Stadium)
- Opened: 1982
- Renovated: 2012 (reopened in 2014)

Tenants
- Adhyaksa F.C. Bekasi; Persipasi Kota Bekasi; Persija Jakarta; Semen Padang F.C.

Patriot Candrabhaga Stadium (Indonesian: Stadion Patriot Candrabhaga) is a multi-purpose stadium located in Bekasi, West Java, Indonesia. It is currently used mostly for association football matches. The stadium holds 30,000 people.

== History ==
Patriot Stadium first built as Bekasi Stadium in 1980 with a capacity of only 5,000-10,000 spectators. Since 2011, the stadium has been upgraded into an international stadium. This international standard construction project costs amounted to 450 billion rupiah. Source of funding construction of the stadium itself comes from the Government of Bekasi gradually.

This roof stadium grandstand was made of zincalume metal and had a VIP grandstand which can accommodate up to 9,000 spectators and a parking deck which can accommodate thousands of cars and motorcycles. The inauguration ceremony of the stadium expansion was held in conjunction with the 17th anniversary of Bekasi on 10 March 2014.

In February 2015, the Bekasi City Arts Council formed a team to study potential names for the stadium. Ahmad Zurfaih and KH Noer Ali, two prominent figures from Bekasi, were ruled out because their names had already been designated for other locations. Ahmad Zurfaih's name was planned for a street in Bojongmenteng, while KH Noer Ali's name had already been widely used for government infrastructure and public facilities. Other proposed names included Chandrabaga Stadium (Note: Chandrabhaga is mentioned in the Tugu inscription, a mid 5th century Tarumanagara inscriptions. Scholars have hypothesised that the name may be the etymological origin of the modern name "Bekasi".), Tarumanegara Stadium, Patriot Bekasi City Stadium (Note: Bekasi is nicknamed the "Patriot City" in recognition of the role played by its people in Indonesia's struggle for independence. Bekasi was a site of repeated clashes between Indonesian fighters and British Allied forces and Dutch forces seeking to re-establish colonial rule. Notable events included the Kali Bekasi incident on October 1945 and the burning of Bekasi by Allied forces in December 1945. The local struggle continued through subsequent military confrontations and became part of the region's historical identity.), and Purnawarman (Note: Purnawarman was the third king of the Tarumanagara Kingdom, which ruled parts of western Java during the fifth century. The Tugu inscription, discovered in present-day North Jakarta, records irrigation and river-diversion works carried out during his reign) Stadium. Further deliberations involving various stakeholders and the residents of Bekasi were planned to select a name from the proposals. The stadium was eventually named Patriot Candrabhaga Stadium.

The stadium was previously used by FC Bekasi City for the Championship. It is currently used by Persija Jakarta for the Indonesia Super League, as well as Semen Padang F.C. and Adhyaksa F.C. Bekasi for the Championship.

== Tournaments hosted ==
- 2018 Asian Games men's football
- 2018 AFC U-19 Championship
- 2022 AFF U-19 Youth Championship
- 2025 ASEAN U-23 Championship

== Gallery ==
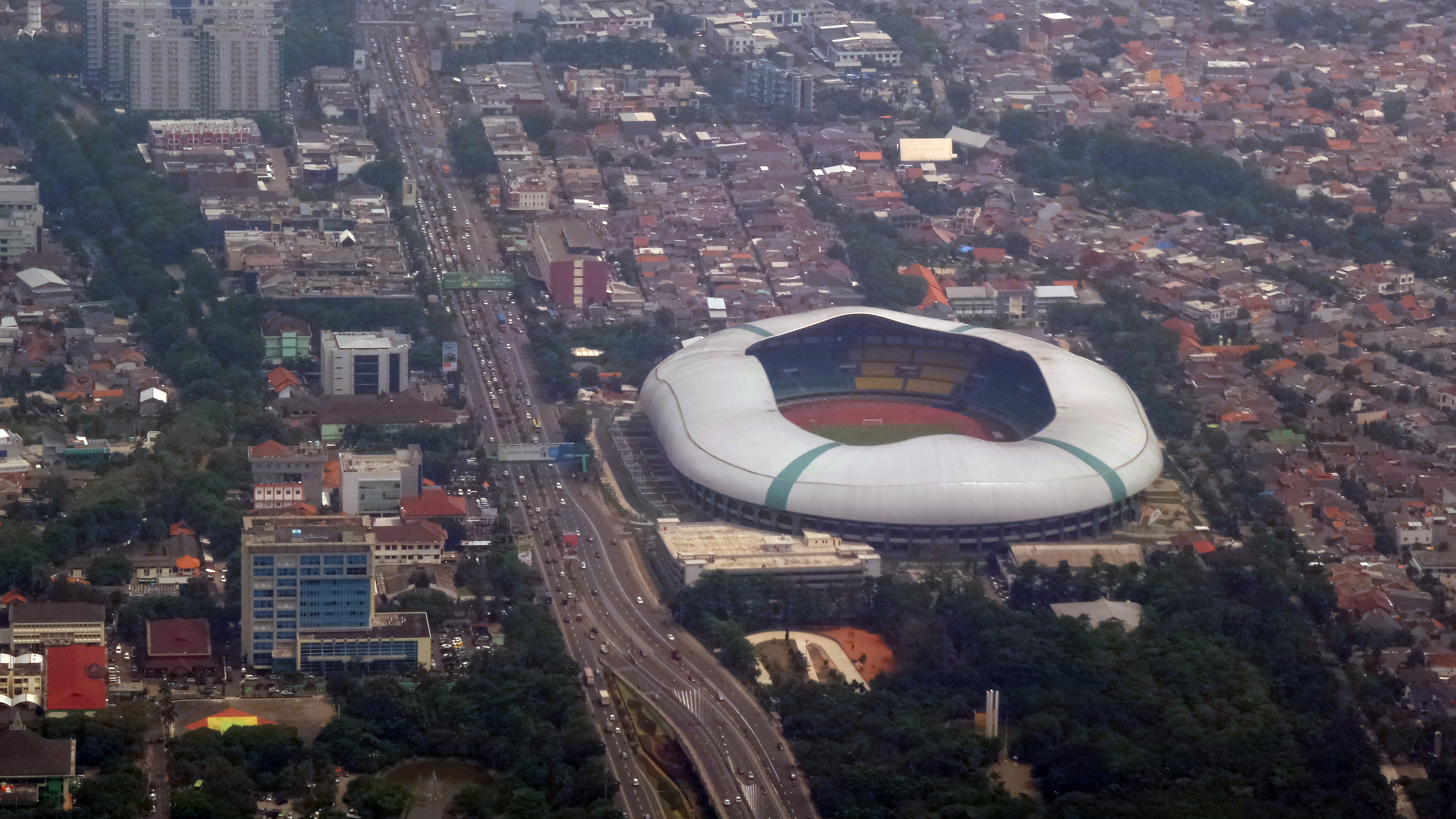
Aerial view, 2016

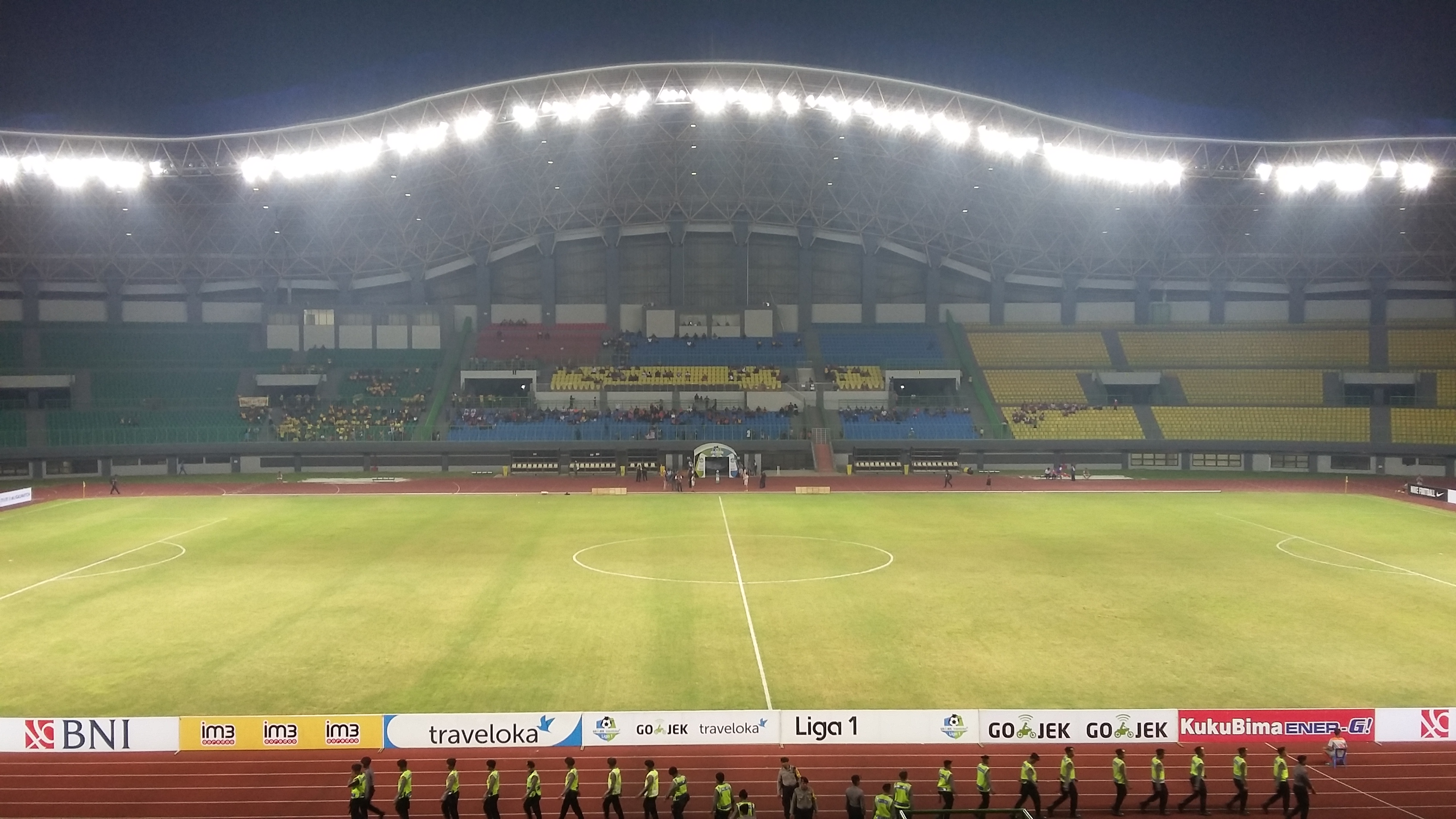

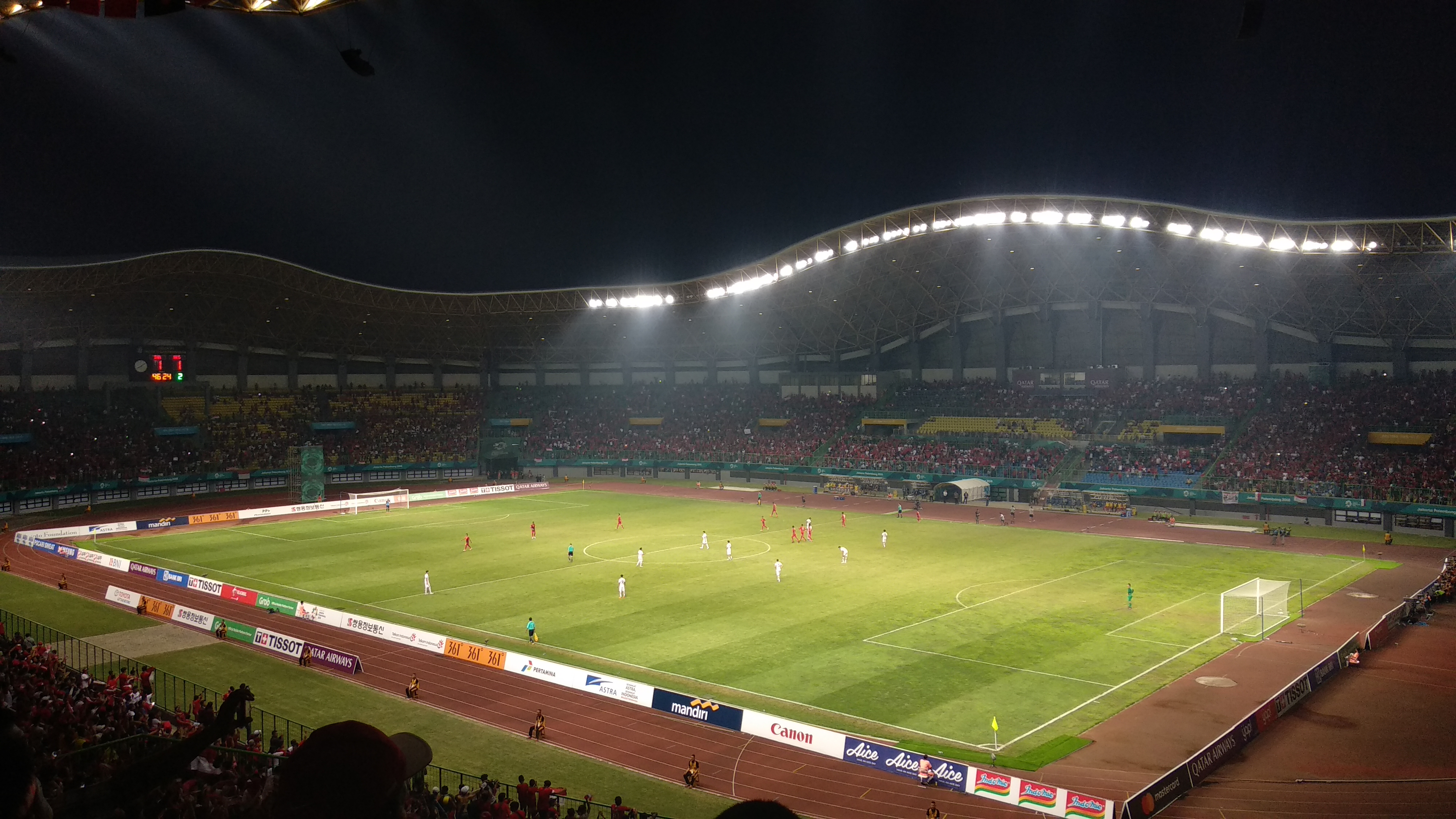

== See also ==
- Lists of stadiums
- List of stadiums in Indonesia
