= Haiqal Haqeemi =

Malaysian footballer

Personal information
- Full name: Muhammad Haiqal Haqeemi bin Hairi
- Date of birth: 4 November 2003 (age 22)
- Place of birth: Taman Melawati, Malaysia
- Height: 1.70 m (5 ft 7 in)
- Positions: Attacking midfielder; winger

Team information
- Current team: Negeri Sembilan
- Number: 21

Youth career
- 2016–2020: Mokhtar Dahari Academy
- 2021: Selangor

Senior career*
Years	Team	Apps	(Gls)
2022–2024	Selangor II	13	(0)
2024–2025	Selangor	0	(0)
2025–	Negeri Sembilan	0	(0)

International career^{‡}
2022	Malaysia U19	9	(2)
2025	Malaysia U23	1	(0)
- * Club domestic league appearances and goals as of 24 June 2025 (UTC) ‡ National team caps and goals as of 24 June 2025

Muhammad Haiqal Haqeemi bin Hairi (born 4 November 2003) is a Malaysian professional footballer who plays as a winger for Malaysia Super League club Negeri Sembilan.

== Club career ==
=== Selangor II ===
Haiqal Haqeemi began his career with Selangor II, the reserve team of Selangor FC. He played for the team from 2021 to 2024, making 31 appearances and scoring 1 goal.

=== Selangor ===
On 4 February 2024, Haiqal was officially promoted to the Selangor first team ahead of the 2024–25 Malaysia Super League season. Despite being part of the senior squad, he has yet to make an official appearance for the first team.

=== Negeri Sembilan ===
On 24 June 2025, Haiqal was announced as a new signing for Negeri Sembilan ahead of the 2025–26 Malaysia Super League season. He stay for the 2026–27 season announced by the club.

== International career ==
=== Malaysia U19 ===
Haiqal represented Malaysia at youth level. On 5 July 2022, he made his debut for the Malaysia U19 national team in a match against Cambodia U19 during the AFF U-19 Youth Championship, scoring a goal on his debut. Malaysia went on to win the tournament, defeating Laos U19 2–0 in the final.

On 14 September 2022, he made appearance for the Malaysia U19 team in the AFC U-20 Asian Cup qualifiers. He was part of the squad that competed in the qualification matches for the 2023 edition of the tournament.

=== Malaysia U23 ===
In August 2025, Haiqal Haqeemi received his first call-up to the Malaysia under-23 national team for the 2026 AFC U-23 Asian Cup qualification tournament. He made his international debut on 6 September 2025 in a 7–0 victory over Mongolia, but suffered an anterior cruciate ligament (ACL) injury during the match, ruling him out for the remainder of the 2025–26 season.

== Career statistics ==
=== Club ===
As of 21 June 2025

Club	Season	League			Cup		League Cup		Total	
Club	Season	Division	Apps	Goals	Apps	Goals	Apps	Goals	Apps	Goals
Selangor II	2022	Malaysia Premier League	13	0	0	0	0	0	13	0
Selangor II	2023	MFL Cup	—							
Selangor II	2024–25	MFL Cup	—							
Selangor II	Total		13	0	0	0	0	0	13	0
Selangor	2024–25	Malaysia Super League	0	0	0	0	0	0	0	0
Negeri Sembilan	2025–26	Malaysia Super League	0	0	1	0	0	0	1	0
Negeri Sembilan	2026–27	Malaysia Super League	0	0	0	0	0	0	0	0
Negeri Sembilan	Total		0	0	0	0	0	0	1	0
Career Total			13	0	1	0	0	0	14	0
