= Nguyễn Quốc Việt =

Vietnamese footballer (born 2003)

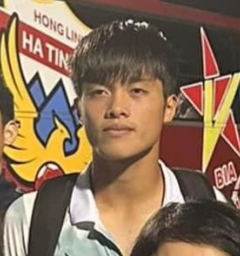
- Quốc Việt in 2024

Personal information
- Full name: Nguyễn Quốc Việt
- Date of birth: 4 May 2003 (age 23)
- Place of birth: Thủy Nguyên, Hải Phòng, Vietnam
- Height: 1.73 m (5 ft 8 in)
- Position: Striker

Team information
- Current team: Ninh Bình
- Number: 99

Youth career
- 2016: Hải Dương
- 2016–2020: Hoàng Anh Gia Lai
- 2020–2022: Nutifood

Senior career*
Years	Team	Apps	(Gls)
2021–2023	Nutifood	0	(0)
2021–2022	→ PVF (loan)	12	(1)
2023–2025	Hoàng Anh Gia Lai	40	(2)
2024–2025	→ Phù Đổng Ninh Bình (loan)	20	(5)
2025–	Ninh Bình	27	(4)

International career^{‡}
2022–2023	Vietnam U20	19	(9)
2022–2026	Vietnam U23	48	(9)
Medal record
Men's football
Representing Vietnam
SEA Games
Bronze medal – third place	Phnom Penh 2023	Team
AFC U-23 Asian Cup
Third place	Saudi Arabia 2026
ASEAN U-23 Championship
Winner	Cambodia 2022
Winner	Thailand 2023
Winner	Indonesia 2025
AFF U-19 Youth Championship
Third place	Indonesia 2022	Team
- * Club domestic league appearances and goals as of 30 October 2026 ‡ National team caps and goals as of 25 September 2026

Nguyễn Quốc Việt (born 4 May 2003) is a Vietnamese professional footballer who plays as a striker for V.League 1 club Ninh Bình.

== Early career ==
Born in Hải Phòng, Quốc Việt started his youth career at Hải Dương, playing for the Trần Hưng Đạo Middle School football team. In 2016, the team won the National U13 Cup organised in Đắk Lắk, with Quốc Việt being scouted by Guillaume Graechen and admitted directly to Hoang Anh Gia Lai – Arsenal JMG Academy after the final.

With Hoàng Anh Gia Lai, Quốc Việt finished as runner-up in Vietnamese National U-19 Championship for two consecutive seasons (2019 and 2020). Quốc Việt finished in both editions as top scorer by scoring respectively 2 and 3 goals during the final tournament. In 2020, he joined Nutifood JMG Academy, a partner club of Hoàng Anh Gia Lai and played with the U17 team in the Vietnamese National U-17 Championship. Quốc Việt won the golden shoe by scoring 9 goals throughout the tournament, and lead his team to the final, where they were defeated by U17 Sông Lam Nghệ An.

At the age of 18, Quốc Việt participated in the 2021 Vietnamese National U-21 Championship. Despite his young age, Quốc Việt continued winning the top scorer title with 4 goals scored in the final tournament, including the only goal that helped Nutifood beat U21 Hà Nội 1–0 in the final.

== Club career ==
=== PVF ===
In August 2021, Quốc Việt was loaned to PVF, who play in Vietnamese Second Division. However, the 2021 season has been canceled by the Vietnam Football Federation due to the impact of the COVID-19 epidemic. The loan was extended until the 2022 season, with Quốc Việt making his debut for PVF against SHB Đà Nẵng B. At the end of the championship, PVF only finished seventh out of eight teams in their group, having scored only 8 goals in total.

=== Hoàng Anh Gia Lai ===
In June 2022, Hoàng Anh Gia Lai's manager Kiatisuk Senamuang expressed his wish to integrate Quốc Việt to the team. The player had previously played for Nutifood and PVF earlier that season, making the move impossible at the moment because FIFA rules forbid a player from playing for more than 2 clubs in the same season. Quốc Việt remained at Nutifood until the end of the season and played in the 2022 Vietnamese Football League Third Division.

On 6 December 2022, it was confirmed that Quốc Việt will join Hoang Anh Gia Lai from the 2023 season. On 5 April 2023, he scored his first professional goal on Hoang Anh Gia Lai's 4–1 V.League 1 win against Viettel. This was his only league goal during the season. In the following season, Quốc Việt scored one goal, in the 1–0 win against Becamex Bình Dương in the avant-dernier matchday, thus help Hoàng Anh Gia Lai avoid relegation.

=== Ninh Bình ===
On 15 October 2024, Quốc Việt was loaned to V.League 2 club Phù Đổng Ninh Bình. Following the team's promotion to the 2025–26 V.League 1, Quốc Việt was permanently transferred to Ninh Bình, signing a 3-year contract with the team.

== International career ==
=== Youth ===
In January 2022, Quốc Việt was named in Vietnam U23's squad to participate in the 2022 AFF U-23 Youth Championship in Cambodia. Quốc Việt took part in Vietnam's victory against Thailand U23 and Singapore U23 in the group stage before being ruled out of the squad for the rest of the tournament for being tested positive to COVID-19. Vietnam were later crowned as champions after defeating Thailand U23 in the final.

Quốc Việt then participated in the 2022 AFF U-19 Youth Championship. He scored 4 goals in the group stage, helping Vietnam U19 finishing as group winner. In the semi-final, Quốc Việt and his teammates lost against Malaysia U19. Quốc Việt scored the equalizer goal in the third place match against Thailand U19, which leads the match in the penalty shootout, where Vietnam U19 won 5–3 and secured the bronze medal. With 5 goals scored, Quốc Việt received the top scorer award.

During the 2023 AFC U-20 Asian Cup, Quốc Việt scored twice in the group stage in Vietnam's victory Australia and Qatar. Despite winning two out of three of their group stage matches, Vietnam failed to qualified for the quarter-finals.

Later in the year, Quốc Việt was named by coach Philippe Troussier on Vietnam U22 squad for the 2023 SEA Games. Quốc Việt scored one goal during the tournament and won the bronze medal with Vietnam. A few months after, he took part in the 2023 AFF U-23 Championship with Vietnam U23, scoring one goal in the semi-final game against Malaysia U23 in a 4–1 victory. He missed a penalty during the final against Indonesia U23 which resulted the game in a goalless draw after 120 minutes. Nevertheless, Vietnam U23 defeated Indonesia U23 in the penalty shootouts and won the title for the second time.

In April 2024, Quốc Việt was named in Vietnam U23's 23-men squad for the 2024 AFC U-23 Asian Cup. However, he caught a viral fever at the beginning of the tournament, which eventually made him absent for the entire tournament.

In July 2025, Quốc Việt was called up to feature in the 2025 ASEAN U-23 Championship. He didn't score in the tournament, as Vietnam ended up defending the title. As the result, Quốc Việt became the first player in history to win three ASEAN U-23 Championship titles.

=== Senior ===
In October 2024, Quốc Việt received his first call up to the Vietnam national team for the friendly game against India.

== Playing style ==
Quốc Việt possesses the skills of a modern goalscorer with a great pace, technique, positioning and finishing ability with his feet as well as with his head. He is called the "King of youth competitions" by Vietnamese media with a series of individual and team titles that he won in youth competitions. His style is similar to Anderson Talisca.

== Career statistics ==
=== Club ===
As of match played 30 October 2026

Appearances and goals by club, season and competition
Club	Season	League			Cup		Other		Total	
Club	Season	Division	Apps	Goals	Apps	Goals	Apps	Goals	Apps	Goals
PVF	2022	Vietnamese Second Division	12	1	—		—		12	1
Hoàng Anh Gia Lai	2023	V.League 1	13	1	2	1	—		15	2
Hoàng Anh Gia Lai	2023–24	V.League 1	23	1	0	0	—		23	1
Hoàng Anh Gia Lai	2024–25	V.League 1	4	0	0	0	—		4	0
Hoàng Anh Gia Lai	Total		40	2	2	1	0	0	42	3
Ninh Bình	2024–25	V.League 2	20	5	1	0	—		21	5
Ninh Bình	2025–26	V.League 1	21	3	4	0	—		25	3
Ninh Bình	2026–27	V.League 1	6	1	0	0	—		6	1
Ninh Bình	Total		47	9	5	0	0	0	52	9
Total career			99	12	7	1	0	0	106	13

== Honours ==
Ninh Bình

- V.League 2: 2024–25

Vietnam U19

- AFF U-19 Youth Championship third place: 2022
- International Thanh Niên Newspaper Cup: 2022

Vietnam U23

- ASEAN U-23 Championship: 2022, 2023, 2025
- SEA Games gold medal: 2025; bronze medal: 2023
- AFC U-23 Asian Cup third place: 2026

Individual

- Vietnamese National U-19 Football Championship top scorer: 2019, 2020, 2021
- Vietnamese National U-17 Football Championship top scorer: 2020
- Vietnamese National U-17 Football Championship best player: 2020
- Vietnamese National U-21 Football Championship best player: 2021
- Vietnamese National U-21 Football Championship top scorer: 2021
- AFF U-19 Youth Championship top scorer: 2022
