= Nattakit Butsing =

Thai footballer (born 2003)

Personal information
- Full name: Nattakit Butsing
- Date of birth: 2 May 2003 (age 23)
- Place of birth: Uthai Thani, Thailand
- Height: 1.70 m (5 ft 7 in)
- Positions: Forward; winger

Youth career
- 2012–2016: Samut Prakan
- 2017–2021: BG Pathum United

Senior career*
Years	Team	Apps	(Gls)
2021–2022	Uthai Thani	1	(0)
2021–2022	→ Unión Adarve (loan)	0	(0)
2022–2023	Bangkok United	0	(0)
2022–2023	→ Samut Prakan (loan)	16	(0)
2023	Samut Prakan	6	(0)
Total		23	(0)

International career
2022	Thailand U19	2	(2)
- * Club domestic league appearances and goals as of 19 September 2023

Nattakit Butsing (Thai: ณัฐกิตติ์ บุตรสิงห์; born 2 May 2003) is a Thai footballer former professional footballer who plays as a forward or a winger.

== Club career ==
=== Early life ===
Nattakit started playing football in kindergarten, before moving to Samut Prakan province as a child. He went on to sign for Samut Prakan, before being offered a contract with BG Pathum United at the age of fourteen. He spent time at BG Pathum United's Yamaoka Hanasaka Academy, where he was spotted by scouts for the Thailand national youth teams.

=== Uthai Thani and experience abroad ===
At the end of the 2020–21 season, Nattakit signed with Uthai Thani. In June 2021 he travelled to Germany to participate as a FC Bayern World Squad player, and spent time playing friendlies for them in Mexico, where he scored three goals in three games.

In August 2021, he signed a new deal with Uthai Thani, before a trial with Spanish La Liga side Getafe.

In December 2021, Nattakit joined Spanish side Unión Adarve, initially being assigned to their under-19 side. Despite this move, Nattakit continued to represent Bayern Munich in youth international friendlies, being called up for a tournament in Brazil in April 2022.

== International career ==
Nattakit has represented Thailand at numerous youth international levels.
