= 2023 Myanmar National League =

Myanmar National League
- Season: 2023
- Dates: 21 February - 18 December
- Champions: Shan United
- Runner up: Yangon United
- Relegated: Kachin United, GFA
- AFC Challenge League: Shan United
- Matches: 132
- Goals: 422 (3.2 per match)
- Top goalscorer: Bello (13 goals)
- Best goalkeeper: San Set Naing (11 Clean sheets)
- Biggest home win: Yangon United 9-0 GFA (18 July)
- Biggest away win: Chinland FC 0-5 Yangon United (23 February)
- Highest scoring: Yangon United 9-0 GFA (18 July)
- Longest winning run: Shan United (5 matches)
- Longest unbeaten run: Shan United (16 matches)
- Longest winless run: Kachin United (7 matches)
- Longest losing run: Shan United (20 matches)

The 2023 Myanmar National League was the fourteenth season of first-division domestic football in Myanmar. It consisted of twelve teams, as two teams from the 2022 MNL-2 were promoted.

Shan United were the defending champions after winning their third consecutive title in the 2022 season.

== MNL rules ==
It has been decided that the 2023 Myanmar National League will be played from the third week of February to the last week of October. The matches are set to be played at Thuwunna Stadium and Yangon United Sports Complex.

In the registration rules it has also been decided that some young players should be in the final registration list for the success of the Myanmar U-23 team in the SEA Games.

== Prize money ==
- Champion: Ks. 10,00,00,000/- More than
- Runner-up: Ks. 7,50,00,000/- More than
- Third Place: Ks. 5,00,00,000/- More than

== Foreign players ==
=== Foreign players ===
Players name in bold indicates the player was registered during the mid-season transfer window.

Club	Player 1	Player 2	Player 3	Asia Player 4	Former Players
Ayeyawady United					
Chinland	(Ghana) Addae Josepth				(Ghana) Yaw Kusi
Hanthawaddy United					
I.S.P.E F.C.					
Myawady F.C.					
Rakhine United	(Ivory Coast) Alassane Traore				(Cameroon) Soulemanou Mandjombe (Nigeria) Barbanas Friday
Mahar United	(Cameroon) Patrick Edubat	(Cameroon) Soulemanou Mandjombe			
Shan United	(Ivory Coast) Kim Bello Racheel	(Ivory Coast) Kekere Moukailou	(Ghana) Mark Sekyi	(Japan) Motohiro Kaneshiro	
Yadanarbon					
Yangon United					(Colombia) José Adolfo Valencia (Guinea) Sekou Sylla (Ghana) Marlle Habila
Dagon Star United					
Kachin United	(Ghana) Yaw Kusi				

== Clubs ==
=== Personnel and sponsoring ===
Note: Flags indicate national team as has been defined under FIFA eligibility rules. Players may hold more than one non-FIFA nationality.

Team	Head coach	Captain	Kit manufacturer	Shirt sponsor
Ayeyawady United	(Myanmar) U Myo Hlaing Win	(Myanmar) Aung Naing Win	(Thailand) Pro Sport	
Dagon Star United	(Myanmar) U Min Tun Lin	(Myanmar) Maung Maung Win	(Thailand) Pro Sport	
GFA	(Myanmar) U KB Siang Cung Lian	(Myanmar) Shwe Win Tun	(Myanmar) X-One sport	(Myanmar) Versus Gear
Hantharwady United	(Myanmar) U Myo Min Tun	(Myanmar) Ko Ko Naing	(Myanmar) SCM	(Myanmar) Grand Royal
I.S.P.E	(Myanmar) U Chit Naing	(Myanmar) Aye Chan Thar	(Thailand) FBT	
Kachin United	(Myanmar) U Kyaw Thu Aung Myint Tun	(Myanmar) Mung Htoi Aung	(Myanmar) Ayeyawady Sport	
Mahar United	(Myanmar) U Zaw Linn Tun	(Myanmar) Kyaw Swar Min	(Myanmar) Ayeyawady Sport	
Myawady	(Myanmar) U Maung Maung Aye	(Myanmar) Wai Yan Oo	(Myanmar) M21	
Rakhine United	(Myanmar) U Kyaw Lwin	(Myanmar) Zaw Zaw Naing	(Myanmar) Ayeyawady Sport	(Myanmar) Rakhapura
Shan United	(Myanmar) U Han Win Aung	(Myanmar) Hein Thiha Zaw	(Myanmar) Pro Sport	(Myanmar) KBZ Pay
Yadanarbon	(Myanmar) U Aung Kyaw Moe	(Myanmar) Hein Nay San	(Myanmar) M21	(Myanmar) Alpine
Yangon United	(Germany) Gerd Zeise	(Myanmar) Yan Naing Oo	(Myanmar) M21	(Myanmar) FNI

=== Managerial changes ===
Team	Outgoing manager	Manner of departure	Date of vacancy	Week	Table	Incoming manager
Yangon United	(Myanmar) Kyaw Dun	Sacked	25 July 2023	Week 13	2	(Germany) Gerd Zeise

== League table ==
Pos	Team	Pld	W	D	L	GF	GA	GD	Pts	Qualification or relegation
1	Shan United (C, Q)	22	19	3	0	62	19	+43	60	Qualification for the AFC Challenge League group stage and 2024–25 ASEAN Club Championship qualifying play-offs
2	Yangon United	22	16	3	3	57	13	+44	51	
3	Hantharwady United	22	12	1	9	35	25	+10	37	
4	ISPE	22	9	5	8	38	31	+7	32	
5	Dagon Star United	22	9	4	9	33	31	+2	31	
6	Myawady	22	9	4	9	34	38	−4	31	
7	Mahar United	22	8	6	8	27	37	−10	30	
8	Rakhine United	22	7	6	9	31	37	−6	27	
9	Ayeyawady United	22	7	5	10	34	42	−8	26	
10	Yadanarbon	22	5	8	9	25	32	−7	23	
11	GFA (R)	22	3	3	16	22	70	−48	12	Relegation to 2024 MNL-2
12	Kachin United (R)	22	2	4	16	17	40	−23	10	Relegation to 2024 MNL-2

Source: Soccerway
Rules for classification: 1) Points; 2) Head-to-head points; 3) Head-to-head goal difference; 4) Head-to-head goals scored; 5) Goal difference; 6) Goals scored.
(C) Champions; (Q) Qualified for the phase indicated; (R) Relegated

== Results ==
Home \ Away	AYU	DSU	GFA	HTU	ISP	KCU	MHR	MWD	RKU	SHU	YAD	YGU
Ayeyawady United	—	3–2	4–1	1–0	0–2	5–3	2–2	2–3	2–2	1–3	0–1	1–2
Dagon Star United	2–2	—	3–1	0–3	2–3	1–0	4–0	1–0	1–3	2–3	2–1	0–1
GFA	1–1	1–4	—	1–3	2–1	1–0	3–5	1–1	0–2	1–6	2–1	0–5
Hantharwady United	1–0	1–0	4–1	—	1–2	2–0	3–0	2–0	3–2	1–2	1–3	1–2
ISPE	2–3	0–1	2–2	3–0	—	4–0	3–0	2–0	4–0	1–3	1–1	0–4
Kachin United	1–2	0–1	2–0	0–3	2–4	—	0–2	0–1	0–2	0–0	2–2	0–1
Mahar United	2–1	0–0	3–1	3–2	0–0	3–1	—	1–3	0–0	0–1	0–0	1–0
Myawady	0–1	1–1	4–1	1–1	2–1	1–3	4–2	—	2–3	1–4	3–1	3–2
Rakhine United	2–2	3–4	3–1	0–1	1–1	0–0	1–3	1–2	—	1–2	2–1	1–4
Shan United	5–1	3–1	5–1	2–1	2–0	3–2	4–1	4–0	3–0	—	3–2	0–0
Yadanarbon	3–0	2–1	2–0	0–1	1–1	0–0	0–0	1–1	1–1	2–4	—	0–3
Yangon United	4–1	0–0	9–0	2–0	4–1	1–0	4–0	3–1	1–2	0–0	4–0	—

Legend: Blue = home team win; Yellow = draw; Red = away team win.
For upcoming matches, an "a" indicates there is an article about the rivalry between the two participants.

=== Positions by round ===
Team ╲ Round	1	2	3	4	5	6	7	8	9	10	11	12	13	14	15	16	17	18	19
Ayeyawady United	3	10	11	11	11	12	12	12	12	11	11	10	10	10		10	10	8	
Dagon Star United	4	4	3	4	6	8	8	10	8	8	5	6	9	7		8	6	5	
GFA	12	6	8	9	8	9	9	11	11	12	12	12	12	12		11	11	11	
Hantharwady United	5	8	5	5	3	3	3	4	4	4	4	4	5	3		3	3	3	
I.S.P.E	11	5	4	3	4	4	4	3	3	3	3	3	3	5		4	4	4	
Kachin	9	12	9	12	12	11	11	8	10	10	10	11	11	11		12	12	12	
Mahar United	10	3	7	6	5	7	5	6	7	9	6	5	4	4		5	5	6	
Myawady	6	11	12	8	10	10	10	9	6	7	9	9	8	6		9	7	9	
Rakhine United	8	7	6	7	7	6	7	7	9	6	8	8	7	9		6	8	7	
Shan United	2	2	2	1	1	1	1	1	1	1	1	1	1	1	1	1	1	1	
Yadanarbon	7	9	10	10	9	5	6	5	5	5	7	7	6	8		7	9	10	
Yangon United	1	1	1	2	2	2	2	2	2	2	2	2	2	2	2	2	2	2	

Qualification to the 2024 AFC Cup Group Stage
Standby team to the 2024 AFC Cup Play-off
Relegation to the 2024 MNL-2

Source: 2023MNL

=== Matches ===
Fixtures and results of the Myanmar National League 2023 season.

=== Week 1 ===
21/2/2023	**Shan United**	**2-0**	**ISPE**	YUSC, Yangon
15:45 UTC+06:30	Lin Htet Soe 62'; Ye Yint Aung 82'

21/2/2023	**Dagon Star**	**2-2**	**Ayeyawady United**	Thuwunna Stadium, Yangon
16:00 UTC+06:30	Nan Htike Zaw 12'; Nyi Nyi Aung 88'		Aung Thiha 46', 68'

22/2/2023	**Mahar United**	**0-0**	**Rakhine United**	Thuwunna Stadium, Yangon
16:00 UTC+06:30

22/2/2023	**Yadanarbon**	**0-0**	**Kachin United**	YUSC, Yangon
15:45 UTC+06:30

23/2/2023	**GFA**	**0-4**	**Yangon United**	YUSC, Yangon
16:00 UTC+06:30			Win Naing Tun 21', 30', 45'; Kaung Htet Soe 50'; Okkar Naing 86'

23/2/2023	**Myawady**	**1-1**	**Hanthawady United**	Thuwunna Stadium, Yangon
16:00 UTC+06:30	Hein Zayr Min 45+2'		Aung Myat Thu 61'

=== Week 2 ===
25/2/2023	**Ayeyawady United**	**0-2**	**ISPE**	YUSC, Yangon
15:45 UTC+06:30			Win Pyae Maung 24'; Thu Rein Tun 64'

26/2/2023	**Rakhine United**	**3-4**	**Dagon Star**	Thuwunna Stadium, Yangon
16:00 UTC+06:30	Thiha Htet Aung 42'; Than Kyaw Htay 73', 80'		Wai Yan Phyo 5'; Sitt Mone 45'; Wai Lin Aung 52'; Zaw Lin Oo 78'

27/2/2023	**Hanthawady United**	**1-2**	**Shan United**	Thuwunna Stadium, Yangon
16:00 UTC+06:30	Myo Zaw Oo 65'		Bello 72' (pen.); Lin Htt Soe 85'

27/2/2023	**Yangon United**	**2-1**	**Myawady**	YUSC, Yangon
15:45 UTC+06:30	Win Naing Tun 24', 60'; Okkar Naing 77'		Aung Thu 81' (pen.)

28/2/2023	**Kachin UNited**	**0-2**	**Mahar United**	YUSC, Yangon
16:00 UTC+06:30			Thet Naing 90+1' (pen.), 90+4'

28/2/2023	**GFA**	**2-1**	**Yadanarbon**	Thuwunna Stadium, Yangon
16:00 UTC+06:30	Babatunede 15'; Tha Toe Aung 40'		Swam Htet 70' (pen.)

=== Week 3 ===
3/3/2023	**Dagon Star**	**4-0**	**Mahar United**	YUSC, Yangon
15:45 UTC+06:30	Nyi Nyi Aung 15'; Zaw Lin Oo 60'; Min Myat Soe 85', 90'

3/3/2023	**Ayeyawady United**	**1-3**	**Shan United**	Thuwunna Stadium, Yangon
16:00 UTC+06:30	Yan Naing Lin 90+2'		Bello 6' (pen.); Moukailou 20'; Lin Htet Soe 75'

4/3/2023	**ISPE**	**2-0**	**Myawady**	Thuwunna Stadium, Yangon
16:00 UTC+06:30	Thu Rein Tun 22', 72'

5/3/2023	**Rakhine United**	**2-1**	**Yadanarbon**	Thuwunna Stadium, Yangon
15:45 UTC+06:30	Traore 7', 12'		Moe Swe 23'

6/3/2023	**Hanthawady UNited**	**4-1**	**GFA**	YUSC, Yangon
16:00 UTC+06:30	Yan Naing Aung 34'; Soe Kyaw Kyaw 42'; Aung Myat Thu 83'; Zin Min Tun 90+2'		John Kui Hleih 90+4'

6/3/2023	**Kachin United**	**0-1**	**Yangon United**	Thuwunna Stadium, Yangon
16:00 UTC+06:30			Sekou Sylla 27'

=== Week 4 ===
9/3/2023	**Mahar United**	**0-0**	**Yadanarbon**	YUSC, Yangon
15:45 UTC+06:30

9/3/2023	**Ayeyawady United**	**2-3**	**Myawady**	Thuwunna Stadium, Yangon
16:00 UTC+06:30	Nyi Nyi Aung 7'; Yan Naing Lin 86'		Aung Thu 56', 83'; Naing Zin Htet 78'

10/3/2023	**Shan United**	**5-1**	**GFA**	YUSC, Yangon
15:45 UTC+06:30	Lin Htet Soe 30'; Ye Min Thu 45+2'; Thet Ko KO 70' (o.g.); Zaw Lin 90+3' (o.g.); Khin Kyaw Win 90+5'		Than Toe Aung 85'

10/3/2023	**ISPE**	**4-0**	**Kachin United**	YUSC, Yangon
15:45 UTC+06:30	Thurein Tun 30' (pen.); Win Pyae Maung 53', 57'; Thein Zaw Thiha 90+2'

11/3/2023	**Dagon Star**	**0-1**	**Yangon United**	Thuwunna Stadium, Yangon
16:00 UTC+06:30			Yan Kyaw Soe 61'

12/3/2023	**Rakhine United**	**0-1**	**Hanthawady United**	Thuwunna Stadium, Yangon
16:00 UTC+06:30			Aung Myat Thu 35'

=== Week 5 ===
15/3/2023	**Mahar United**	**2-1**	**Ayeyawady United**	YUSC, Yangon
15:45 UTC+06:30	Thet Naing 2'; Arkar Kyaw 52'		Phyo Thant Ko KO 90'

15/4/2023	**Myawady**	**1-4**	**Shan United**	Thuwunna Stadium, Yangon
16:00 UTC+06:30	Thet Paing Ko Ko 65'		Lin Htet Soe 15', 55'; Nanda Kyaw 28'; Ye Yint Aung 48'

16/3/2023	**Yangon United**	**1-2**	**Rakhine United**	YUSC, Yangon
15:45 UTC+06:30	Zaw Win Thein 23'		Traore 4'; Than Toe Aung 88'

16/3/2023	**Yadanarbon**	**2-1**	**Dagon Star**	YUSC, Yangon
15:45 UTC+06:30	Moe Swe 51'; Thet Hein Soe 79' (pen.)		Wai Lin Aung 68'

17/3/2023	**GFA**	**2-1**	**ISPE**	Thuwunna Stadium, Yangon
16:00 UTC+06:30	Than Toe Aung 4'; Hein Thet Phyo 53'		Win Pyae Maung 45'

18/3/2023	**Kachin United**	**0-3**	**Hanthawady United**	Thuwunna Stadium, Yangon
16:00 UTC+06:30			Aung Myat Thu 23'; Soe Kyaw Kyaw 72'; Zin Min Tun 85'

=== Week 6 ===
25/5/2023	**Yadanrbon**	**3-0**	**Ayeyawady United**	YUSC, Yangon
15:45 UTC+06:30	Ent Maw Oo 7'; Thet Hein Soe 23', 45+1'

25/5/2023	**GFA**	**1-1**	**Myawady**	Thuwunna Stadium, Yangon
16:00 UTC+06:30	Wai Yan 45'		Aung Thu 90+3'

26/5/2023	**Hanthawady United**	**1-0**	**Dagon Star**	YUSC, Yangon
15:45 UTC+06:30	Arkar 49'

26/5/2023	**Yangon United**	**4-0**	**Mahar United**	YUSC, Yangon
15:45 UTC+06:30	Sylla Sekou 38', 56'; Yan Kyaw Htwe 71', 90+2'

27/5/2023	**Kachin United**	**0-0**	**Shan United**	Thuwunna Stadium, Yangon
16:00 UTC+06:30

2/6/2023	**Rakhine United**	**1-1**	**ISPE**	Thuwunna Stadium, Yangon
16:00 UTC+06:30	Thu Ya 55'		Min Khant 19' (o.g.)

=== Week 7 ===
31/5/2023	**Ayeyawady United**	**4-1**	**GFA**	YUSC, Yangon
15:45 UTC+06:30	Yar Zar Aung 22'; Nyi Nyi Aung 44'; Thiha 52'; Win Htay 89'		Zaw Lin 47'

31/5/2023	**Yadanarbon**	**0-3**	**Yangon United**	Thuwunna Stadium, Yangon
16:00 UTC+06:30			David Htan 29'; Okkar Naing 50'; Yan Kyaw Htwe 90'

1/6/2023	**Myawady**	**1-3**	**Kachin United**	YUSC, Yangon
15:00 UTC+06:30	Aung Thu 90' (pen.)		Ko Ko 9'; Thaw Zin Htwe 15' (o.g.); Nyi Nyi 18'

1/6/2023	**Mahar United**	**3-2**	**Hanthawady United**	Thuwunna Stadium, Yangon
15:00 UTC+06:30	Thet Naing 38'; Arkar Kyaw 51'; Soe Min Naing 60'		Aung Myat Thu 11'; Zin Min Tun 23'

2/6/2023	**Shan United**	**3-0**	**Rakhine United**	YUSC, Yangon
15:45 UTC+06:30	Ye Yint Aung 17'; Mark Sekyi 32'; Racheen Bello 87'

2/6/2023	**Dagon Star**	**2-3**	**ISPE**	Thuwunna Stadium, Yangon
16:00 UTC+06:30	Nyi Nyi Aung 51'; Thet Paing Soe 66'		Kyi Soe 40'; Thein Zaw Thiha 44'; Naing Naing Kyaw 76'

=== Week 8 ===
4/6/2023	**Yangon United**	**4-1**	**Ayeyawady United**	YUSC, Yangon
15:45 UTC+06:30	Sekou Sylla 31', 46'; Zaw Win Thein 37'; David Htan 90+4'		Aung Naing Win 60'

5/6/2023	**Kachin United**	**2-0**	**GFA**	YUSC, Yangon
16:00 UTC+06:30	Nyi Nyi 33', 70'

6/6/2023	**Dagon Star**	**2-3**	**Shan United**	YUSC, Yangon
15:45 UTC+06:30	Nyi Nyi Aung 45+1'; Zaw Lin Oo 84'		Nanda Kyaw 3'; Lin Htet Soe 27'; Myat Kaung Khant 76'

7/6/2023	**Rakhine United**	**1-2**	**Myawady**	YUSC, Yangon
15:45 UTC+06:30	Zaw Zaw Naing 79'		Kaung Zaw Lin 35'; Yell Moe Yan 48'

8/6/2023	**ISPE**	**3-0**	**Mahar United**	YUSC, Yangon
15:45 UTC+06:30	Khaing Ye Win 17', 47'; Thurein Tun 80'

9/6/2023	**Hanthawady United**	**1-3**	**Yadanarbon**	YUSC, Yangon
15:45 UTC+06:30	Aung Myat Thu 6'		Swam Htet 48'; Moe Swe 54'; Thet Hein Soe 87' (pen.)

=== Week 9 ===
21/6/2023	**Dagon Star**	**3-1**	**GFA**	YUSC, Yangon
15:45 UTC+06:30	Wai Yan Phyo 28'; Nyi Nyi Aung 45+1'; Min Myat Soe 57'		Than Toe Aung 53'

22/6/2023	**Hanthawady United**	**1-0**	**Ayeyawady United**	Thuwunna Stadium, Yangon
16:00 UTC+06:30	Zin Min Tun 66' (pen.)

22/6/2023	**Rakhine United**	**0-0**	**Kachin United**	YUSC, Yangon
15:45 UTC+06:30

23/6/2023	**Mahar United**	**1-3**	**Myawady**	Thuwunna Stadium, Yangon
15:45 UTC+06:30	Thet Naing 43'		Thet Wai Moe 44'; Naing Zin Htet 74'; Hein Zayar Min 83'

24/6/2023	**Shan United**	**3-2**	**Yadanarbon**	Thuwunna Stadium, Yangon
15:45 UTC+06:30	Mark Sekyi 28', 90+2'; Bello 45'		Eant Maw Oo 36'; Swan Htet 52'

10/7/2023	**ISPE**	**0-4**	**Yangon United**	Thuwunna Stadium, Yangon
15:45 UTC+06:30			Yan Naing Oo 35'; Sekou Sylla 40', 75'; Okkar Naing 82'

=== Week 10 ===
26/6/2023	**GFA**	**0-2**	**Rakhine United**	YUSC, Yangon
15:45 UTC+06:30			Traore 4'; Soe Min Aung 34'

27/6/2023	**Yangon United**	**2-0**	**Hanthawady United**	YUSC, Yangon
15:45 UTC+06:30	Sekou Sylla 27'; Yan Kyaw Htwe 90+3'

27/6/2023	**Ayeyawady United**	**5-3**	**Kachin United**	Thuwunna Stadium, Yangon
16:00 UTC+06:30	Nyi Nyi Aung 11', 44', 57' (pen.); Shwe Ko 24' (pen.); Aung Thiha 87'		Htoo Myat Khant 4'; Kyaw WIn Thein 36'; Zaw Moon Aung 68' (pen.)

28/6/2023	**Yadanarbon**	**1-1**	**ISPE**	Thuwunna Stadium, Yangon
16:00 UTC+06:30	Thyne Phwet Aung 56'		Naing Naing Kyaw 20'

29/6/2023	**Myawady**	**1-1**	**Dagon Star**	YUSC Stadium, Yangon
15:45 UTC+06:30	Hein Zeyar Min 10'		Thein Tan 14'

30/6/2023	**Mahar United**	**0-1**	**Shan United**	Thuwunna Stadium, Yangon
16:00 UTC+06:30			Myat Kaung Khant 55'

=== Week 11 ===
2/7/2023	**Ayeyawady United**	**2-2**	**Rakhine United**	Thuwunna Stadium, Yangon
16:00 UTC+06:30	Nyi Nyi Aung 13'; Aung Min Thu 37'		Than Kyaw Htay 28'; Maung Maung Soe 53'

3/7/2023	**Hanthwady United**	**1-2**	**ISPE**	YUSC, Yangon
15:45 UTC+06:30	Aung Myat Thu 84'		Zaw Ni 68', 70'

3/7/2023	**Kachin United**	**0-1**	**Dagon Star**	Thuwunna Stadium, Yangon
16:00 UTC+06:30			Wai Lin Aung 78'

5/7/2023	**GFA**	**3-5**	**Mahar United**	Thuwunna Stadium, Yangon
16:00 UTC+06:30	Joseph 55'; Chan Nyein 85'; Hein Hte Phyo 90+2'		Arkar Kyaw 10'; Kyaw Swar Min 38'; Patrick 45+2'; Myo Min Phyo 65'; Nay Lin Tun 88'

5/7/2023	**Yangon United**	**0-0**	**Shan United**	YUSC Stadium, Yangon
15:45 UTC+06:30

6/7/2023	**Yadanarbon**	**1-1**	**Myawady**	Thuwunna Stadium, Yangon
16:00 UTC+06:30	Htet Hlaing Min 89'		Naing Zin Htet 67'

=== Week 12 ===
15/7/2023	**Ayeyawady United**	**3-2**	**Dagon Star**	Thuwunna Stadium, Yangon
16:00 UTC+06:30	Nyi Nyi Aung 5'; Yar Zar Aung 51'; Aung Min Thu 78'		Min Myat Soe 41'; Suan Lam Mang 69'

16/7/2023	**Rakhine United**	**1-3**	**Mahar United**	Thuwunna Stadium, Yangon
15:45 UTC+06:30	Kaung Sithu 90+3'		Thet Naing 36', 57'; Kaung Myat Thu 90+4'

17/7/2023	**Hanthawady United**	**2-0**	**Myawady**	Thuwunna Stadium, Yangon
16:00 UTC+06:30	Aung Myat Thu 61'; Arkar 81'

17/7/2023	**ISPE**	**1-3**	**Shan United**	YUSC Stadium, Yangon
16:00 UTC+06:30	Kyaw Thiha Zaw 85'		Nanda Kyaw 11'; Bello 22', 58' (pen.)

18/7/2023	**Yangon United**	**9-0**	**GFA**	YUSC Stadium, Yangon
15:45 UTC+06:30	Marlle Habila 6'; Sekou Sylla 11'; José Adolfo Valencia 16', 26', 31', 59'; Oakkar Naing 58', 70'; Yan Kyaw Htwe 65'

18/7/2023	**Kachin United**	**2-2**	**Yadanarbon**	Thuwunna Stadium, Yangon
16:00 UTC+06:30	Sai Aung 11'; Zaw Moon Aung 13' (pen.)		Thet Hein Soe 30' (pen.); Kaung Htet Paing 33'

=== Week 13 ===
21/7/2023	**Dagon Star**	**1-3**	**Rakhine United**	Thuwunna Stadium, Yangon
16:00 UTC+06:30	Suan Lam Mang 54'		Maung Maung Soe 15'; Traore 23'; That Tun Aung 55'	Referee: Kyaw Zwell Lwin

22/7/2023	**ISPE**	**2-3**	**Ayeyarwady United**	Thuwunna Stadium, Yangon
15:45 UTC+06:30	Than Toe Aung 47'; Win Pyae Maung 79'		Shwe Ko 73'; Peter Aung Wai Htoo 80', 89'

23/7/2023	**Mahar United**	**3-1**	**Kachin United**	Thuwunna Stadium, Yangon
16:00 UTC+06:30	Kaung Myat Thu 29'; Arkar Kyaw 84'; Soe Min Naing 90+5'		Nyi Nyi 90+1'

24/7/2023	**Shan United**	**2-1**	**Hanthawady United**	YUSC Stadium, Yangon
15:30 UTC+06:30	Mark Sekyi 19'; Bello 55'		Aung Myat Thu 90'

24/7/2023	**Myawady**	**3-2**	**Yangon United**	Thuwunna Stadium, Yangon
15:45 UTC+06:30	Thet Paing Ko 45+2'; Hein Zayar Min 59'; Min Ko Thu 74'		David Htan 25', 54'

25/7/2023	**Yadanarbon**	**2-0**	**GFA**	Thuwunna Stadium, Yangon
16:00 UTC+06:30	Swan Htet 18'; Naung Naung Soe 50'

=== Week 14 ===
28/7/2023	**Ayeaywady United**	**2-2**	**Mahar United**	YUSC Stadium, Yangon
16:00 UTC+06:30	Yan Pai Soe 3'; Peter Aung Wai Htoo 86'		Kaung Myat Thu 26'; Thet Naing 45+1' (pen.)	Referee: Kyaw Zwell Lwin

28/7/2023	**Shan United**	**4-0**	**Myawady**	Thuwunna Stadium, Yangon
15:45 UTC+06:30	Zwe Khant Min 55'; Mark Sekyi 87'; Zar Nay Ya Thu 89'; Ye Yint Aung 90+2'

29/7/2023	**Dagon Star**	**2-1**	**Yadanarbon**	Thuwunna Stadium, Yangon
16:00 UTC+06:30	Naung Naung Soe 19' (o.g.); Min Myat Soe 38'		Moe Swe 60'

31/7/2023	**ISPE**	**2-2**	**GFA**	YUSC Stadium, Yangon
15:30 UTC+06:30	Naing Naing Kyaw 22'; Thein Zaw Thiha 35'		Than Toe Aung 90'; Thet Ko Ko 90+4'

31/7/2023	**Rakhine United**	**1-4**	**Yangon United**	Thuwunna Stadium, Yangon
15:45 UTC+06:30	Traore 25'		Sekou Sylla 5', 36'; Valencia 11', 33'

1/8/2023	**Hanthawady United**	**2-0**	**Kachin United**	Thuwunna Stadium, Yangon
16:00 UTC+06:30	Aung Zaya 27'; Aung Myat Thu 45+1'

=== Week 15 ===
3/8/2023	**Shan United**	**5-1**	**Ayeyawdy United**	Thuwunna Stadium, Yangon
16:00 UTC+06:30	Myat Kaung Khant 1', 23'; Mark Sekyi 32', 34'; Ya Yint Aung 43'		Yazar Aung 80'

3/8/2023	**Mahar United**	**0-0**	**Dagon Star**	YSUC Stadium, Yangon
15:45 UTC+06:30

4/8/2023	**Myawady**	**2-1**	**ISPE**	YUSC Stadium, Yangon
16:00 UTC+06:30	Hein Zayar Min 14'; Thet Paing Ko 65'		Thein Zaw Thiha 45+3'

4/8/2023	**Yadanarbon**	**1-1**	**Rakhine United**	Thuwunna Stadium, Yangon
15:30 UTC+06:30	Hein Nay San 51'		Traore 34'

6/8/2023	**GFA**	**1-3**	**Hanthawady United**	Thuwunna Stadium, Yangon
15:45 UTC+06:30	Yar Zar Myo 73'		Zin Min Tun 20', 45+2'; Lar Din Maw Yar 40'

7/8/2023	**Yangon United**	**2-1**	**Kachin United**	YUSC Stadium, Yangon
16:00 UTC+06:30	Yan Naing Oo 15'; David Htan 39'		Sai Aung 19'

=== Week 16 (postpone) ===
7/12/2023	**ISPE**	**4-0**	**Rakhine United**	YUSC Stadium, Yangon
16:00 UTC+06:30	Kyi Soe 10'; Naing Naing Kyaw 55'; Thu Rein Tun 70'; Win Pyae Maung 87'

7/12/2023	**Dagon Star**	**0-3**	**Hanthawady United**	Thuwunna Stadium, Yangon
15:45 UTC+06:30			Zin Min Tun 16', 89'; Arkar 86'

8/12/2023	**Myawady**	**4-1**	**GFA**	YUSC Stadium, Yangon
16:00 UTC+06:30	Thet Wai Moe 48', 70'; Thiha Zaw 61'; Thant Zin Aung 63'		Hein Htet Phyo 51'

8/12/2023	**Ayeyawady United**	**0-1**	**Yadanarbon**	Thuwunna Stadium, Yangon
15:30 UTC+06:30			Eant Maw Oo 80'

9/12/2023	**Shan United**	**3-2**	**Kachin United**	Thuwunna Stadium, Yangon
15:45 UTC+06:30	Bello 24'; Nanda Kyaw 62'; Ye Min Thu 81'		Sai Aung 19'; S Gun Lum 84'

10/12/2023	**Mahar United**	**1-0**	**Yangon United**	Thuwunna Stadium, Yangon
16:00 UTC+06:30	Aung Hlaing Win 81' (pen.)

=== Week 17 ===
20/10/2023	**Myawady**	**0-1**	**Ayeyawdy United**	Thuwunna Stadium, Yangon
16:00 UTC+06:30			Aung Thi 31'

20/10/2023	**Yadanarbon**	**0-0**	**Mahar United**	YSUC Stadium, Yangon
15:45 UTC+06:30

21/10/2023	**GFA**	**1-6**	**Shan United**	YUSC Stadium, Yangon
16:00 UTC+06:30	Myo Min Aung 61'		Motohiro Kaneshiro 28'; Zar Nay Ya Thu 30', 45'; Bello 43', 47', 48'

22/8/2023	**Yangon United**	**0-0**	**Dagon Star**	YUSC Stadium, Yangon
15:30 UTC+06:30

22/10/2023	**Kachin United**	**2-4**	**ISPE**	Thuwunna Stadium, Yangon
15:45 UTC+06:30	Nyi Nyi 37' (pen.), 42' (pen.)		Thu Rein Tun 11', 59'; Khaing Ye Win 23'; Thein Zaw Thiha 39'

23/10/2023	**Hanthawady United**	**3-2**	**Rakhine United**	Thuwunna Stadium, Yangon
16:00 UTC+06:30	Zin Min Tun 29' (pen.); Aung Myat Thu 37'; Arkar 85'		Traore 20' (pen.); Than Kyaw Htay 41'

=== Week 18 ===
26/10/2023	**Ayeyawady United**	**1-2**	**Yangon United**	Thuwunna Stadium, Yangon
16:00 UTC+06:30	Nyi Nyi Aung 47' (pen.)		Hlaing Bo Bo 14'; La Min Htwe 61'

27/10/2023	**GFA**	**1-0**	**Kachin United**	Thuwunna Stadium, Yangon
16:00 UTC+06:30	Than Toe Aung 36'

27/10/2023	**Mahar United**	**0-0**	**ISPE**	YSUC Stadium, Yangon
15:45 UTC+06:30

28/10/2023	**Yadanarbon**	**0-1**	**Hanthawady United**	Thuwunna Stadium, Yangon
16:00 UTC+06:30			Nay Moe Naing 80'

29/10/2023	**Myawady**	**2-3**	**Rakhine United**	Thuwunna Stadium, Yangon
16:00 UTC+06:30	Thant Zin Aung 10'; Thaw Zin Htwe 77'		Kaung Sithu 17'; Maung Maung Soe 20'; Traore 52' (pen.)

30/10/2023	**Shan United**	**3-1**	**Dagon Star**	YUSC Stadium, Yangon
15:30 UTC+06:30	Lin Htet Soe 62'; Nanda Kyaw 67'; Ye Min Thu 90+3'		Wai Lin Aung 40'

=== Week 19 ===
1/11/2023	**Yangon United**	**4-0**	**Yadanarbon**	YUSC Stadium, Yangon
16:00 UTC+06:30	David Htan 25'; Yan Kyaw Htwe 26', 57'; Zaw Win Thein 90+2'

1/11/2023	**Hanthawady United**	**3-0**	**Mahar United**	Thuwunna Stadium, Yangon
16:00 UTC+06:30	Aung Myat Thu 45+2'; Soe Kyaw Kyaw 63'; Arkar 78'

2/11/2023	**GFA**	**1-1**	**Ayeyawady United**	Thuwunna Stadium, Yangon
15:45 UTC+06:30	Than Toe Aung 58'		Peter Aung Wai Htoo 7'

2/11/2023	**Kachin United**	**0-1**	**Myawady**	YUSC Stadium, Yangon
16:00 UTC+06:30			Hein Zayar Min 80'

3/11/2023	**Rakhine United**	**1-2**	**Shan United**	Thuwunna Stadium, Yangon
16:00 UTC+06:30	Kaung Sithu 62'		Nanda Kyaw 6'; Kaneshino 53'

4/11/2023	**ISPE**	**0-1**	**Dagon Star**	Thuwunna Stadium, Yangon
15:30 UTC+06:30			Nyein Chan 52'

=== Week 20 ===
24/11/2023	**Rakhine United**	**3-1**	**GFA**	Thuwunna Stadium, Yangon
16:00 UTC+06:30	Traore 31'; Maung Maung Soe 42'; Kaung Sithu 90+4'		Wai Yan Tun 10'

25/11/2023	**Shan United**	**4-1**	**Mahar United**	YUSC Stadium, Yangon
16:00 UTC+06:30	Ye Yint Aung 24'; Mark Sekyi 25'; Thet Paing Htwe 31'; Lin Htet Soe 76'		Kaung Myat Thu 90+1'

25/11/2023	**ISPE**	**1-1**	**Yadanarbon**	Thuwunna Stadium, Yangon
15:45 UTC+06:30	Zar Ni 78'		Kaung Htet Paing 90+5'

26/11/2023	**Hanthawady United**	**1-2**	**Yangon United**	Thuwunna Stadium, Yangon
16:00 UTC+06:30	Zin Min Tun 28' (pen.)		Zarni Htet 41'; Zaw Win Thein 63'

27/11/2023	**Dagon Star**	**1-0**	**Myawady**	YUSC Stadium, Yangon
16:00 UTC+06:30	Sitt Mone 85'

27/11/2023	**Kachin United**	**1-2**	**Ayeyawady United**	Thuwunna Stadium, Yangon
15:30 UTC+06:30	Ko Ko 53'		Aung Min Thu 61'; Paing Soe Linn 89'

=== Week 21 ===
01/12/2023	**Yangon United**	**4-1**	**ISPE**	YUSC Stadium, Yangon
14:30 UTC+06:30	Yan Kyaw Htwe 4', 24'; Thar Yar Win Htet 9'; Zwe Ye Tun 90+3'		Thurein Soe 37' (o.g.)

01/12/2023	**Ayeyawady United**	**1-0**	**Hanthawady United**	Thuwunna Stadium, Yangon
15:00 UTC+06:30	Phyo Than Ko Ko 78'

02/12/2023	**Kachin United**	**0-2**	**Rakhine United**	Thuwunna Stadium, Yangon
15:00 UTC+06:30			Alassane Traore 9'; Kaung Sithu 49'

03/12/2023	**GFA**	**1-4**	**Dagon Star**	Thuwunna Stadium, Yangon
15:00 UTC+06:30	Hein Thet Phyo 72'		Nyi Nyi Aung 22' (goal), 35'; Thet Paing Soe 40'; Wai Yan Phyo 58'

04/12/2023	**Myawady**	**4-2**	**Mahar United**	Thuwunna Stadium, Yangon
14:30 UTC+06:30	Naing Zin Htet 11', 22', 86', 88'		Thet Naing 45' (pen.); Kaung Myat Thu 60'

04/12/2023	**Yadanarbon**	**2-4**	**Shan United**	Thuwunna Stadium, Yangon
15:00 UTC+06:30	Swan Htet 53'; Nyein Chan Soe 77'		Bello R. 27', 90'; Mark Sekyi 33'; Zwe Khant Min 45'

=== Week 22 ===
14/12/2023	**Mahar United**	**3-1**	**GFA**	YUSC Stadium, Yangon
14:30 UTC+06:30	Thet Naing 10', 60'; Arkar Kyaw 32' (pen.)		Thawng Tha Thang 72'

15/12/2023	**Rakhine United**	**2-2**	**Ayeyawady United**	YUSC Stadium, Yangon
14:30 UTC+06:30	Soe Min Aung 23'; Lin Htet Paing 81'		Aung Naing Win 37'; Peter Aung Wai Htoo 79' (pen.)

15/12/2023	**Dagon Star**	**1-0**	**Kachin United**	YUSC Stadium, Yangon
15:00 UTC+06:30	Thet Paing Soe 38'

16/12/2023	**ISPE**	**3-0**	**Hanthawady United**	YUSC Stadium, Yangon
15:00 UTC+06:30	Thei Zaw Thiha 28'; Zar Ni 67'; Win Pyae Maung 74'

17/12/2023	**Myawady**	**3-1**	**Yadanarbon**	YUSC Stadium, Yangon
15:00 UTC+06:30	Thant Zin Aung 10', 50'; Soe Min Oo 81'		Moe Swe 88' (pen.)

18/12/2023	**Shan United**	**0-0**	**Yangon United**	YUSC Stadium, Yangon
15:00 UTC+06:30

== Season statistics ==
=== Top scorers ===
As of 17 December 2023.

Rank	Player	Club	Goals
1	(Ivory Coast) Bello	Shan United	13
2	(Myanmar) Aung Myat Thu	Hantharwady United	12
2	(Myanmar) Zin Min Tun	Hantharwady United	11
2	(Myanmar) Thet Naing	Mahar United	11
2	(Guinea) *Sekou Sylla*	Yangon United	11
2	(Myanmar) Yan Kyaw Htwe	Yangon United	11
4	(Ivory Coast) Alassane Traore	Rakhine United	9
4	(Ghana) Mark Sekyi	Shan United	9
4	(Myanmar) Nanda Kyaw	Shan United	9
4	(Myanmar) Lin Htet Soe	Shan United	9
5	(Myanmar) Thu Rein Tun	ISPE	8
6	(Myanmar) Nyi Nyi Aung	Ayeyawady United	7
6	(Myanmar) Nyi Nyi Aung	Dagon Star United	7
6	(Myanmar) Than Toe Aung	GFA	7
6	(Myanmar) Win Pyae Maung	ISPE	7
6	(Myanmar) Naing Zin Htet	Myawady	7
6	(Myanmar) David Htan	Yangon United	7
7	(Myanmar) Nyi Nyi	Kachin United	6
7	(Myanmar) Hein Zayar Min	Myawady	6
7	(Myanmar) Kaung Sithu	Rakhine United	6
7	(Colombia) *José Adolfo Valencia*	Yangon United	6
7	(Myanmar) Zaw Win Thein	Yangon United	6
8	(Myanmar) Peter Aung Wai Htoo	Ayeyawady United	5
8	(Myanmar) Min Myat Soe	Dagon Star United	5
8	(Myanmar) Moe Swe	Yadanarbon	5
8	(Myanmar) Arkar	Hantharwady United	5
8	(Myanmar) Thein Zaw Thiha	ISPE	5
8	(Myanmar) Kaung Myat Thu	Mahar United	5
8	(Myanmar) Aung Thu	Myawady	5
8	(Myanmar) Ye Yint Aung	Shan United	5
8	(Myanmar) Thet Hein Soe	Yadanarbon	5
8	(Myanmar) Swam Htet	Yadanarbon	5
8	(Myanmar) *Win Naing Tun*	Yangon United	5
9	(Myanmar) Aung Thiha	Ayeyawady United	4
9	(Myanmar) Wai Lin Aung	Dagon Star United	4
9	(Myanmar) Hein Thet Phyo	GFA	4
9	(Myanmar) Zar Ni	ISPE	4
9	(Myanmar) Arkar Kyaw	Mahar United	4
9	(Myanmar) Thant Zin Aung	Myawady	4
9	(Myanmar) Maung Maung Soe	Rakhine United	4
9	(Myanmar) Okkar Naing	Yangon United	4
10	(Myanmar) Yan Pai Soe	Ayeyawady United	3
10	(Myanmar) Zaw Lin Oo	Dagon Star United	3
10	(Myanmar) Thet Paing Soe	Dagon Star United	3
10	(Myanmar) Soe Kyaw Kyaw	Hantharwady United	3
10	(Myanmar) Khaing Ye Win	ISPE	3
10	(Myanmar) Sai Aung	Kachin United	3
10	(Myanmar) Thet Wai Moe	Myawady	3
10	(Myanmar) Than Kyaw Htay	Rakhine United	3
10	(Myanmar) Zar Nay Ya Thu	Shan United	3
10	(Myanmar) Ye Min Thu	Shan United	3
10	(Japan) Motohiro Kaneshiro	Shan United	3
10	(Myanmar) Yan Naing Oo	Yangon United	3
10	(Myanmar) Yan Naing Lin	Ayeyawady United	2
10	(Myanmar) Shwe Ko	Ayeyawady United	2
10	(Myanmar) Aung Naing Win	Ayeyawady United	2
10	(Myanmar) Aung Min Thu	Ayeyawady United	2
10	(Myanmar) Yar Zar Aung	Ayeyawady United	2
10	(Myanmar) Wai Yan Phyo	Dagon Star United	2
10	(Myanmar) Suan Lam Mang	Dagon Star United	2
10	(Myanmar) Wai Yan Tun	GFA	2
10	(Myanmar) Naing Naing Kyaw	ISPE	2
10	(Myanmar) Ko Ko	Kachin United	2
10	(Myanmar) Zaw Moon Aung	Kachin United	2
10	(Myanmar) Soe Min Naing	Mahar United	2
10	(Myanmar) Thet Paing Ko Ko	Myawady	2
10	(Myanmar) Soe Min Aung	Rakhine United	2
10	(Myanmar) Zwe Khant Min	Shan United	2
10	(Myanmar) *Myat Kaung Khant*	Shan United	2
10	(Myanmar) Kaung Htet Paing	Yadanarbon	2
10	(Myanmar) Ent Maw Oo	Yadanarbon	2
11	(Myanmar) Thiha	Ayeyawady United	1
11	(Myanmar) Aung Thiha	Ayeyawady United	1
11	(Myanmar) Win Htay	Ayeyawady United	1
11	(Myanmar) Phyo Thant Ko Ko	Ayeyawady United	1
11	(Myanmar) Thein Tan	Dagon Star United	1
11	(Myanmar) Nyein Chan	Dagon Star United	1
11	(Myanmar) Sitt Mone	Dagon Star United	1
11	(Myanmar) Zaw Lin	GFA	1
11	(Myanmar) Myo Min Aung	GFA	1
11	(Myanmar) Joseph	GFA	1
11	(Myanmar) Chan Nyein	GFA	1
11	(Myanmar) Yar Zar Myo	GFA	1
11	(Myanmar) John Kui Hleih	GFA	1
11	(Myanmar) Thawng Tha Thang	GFA	1
11	(Myanmar) Myo Zaw Oo	Hantharwady United	1
11	(Myanmar) Yan Naing Aung	Hantharwady United	1
11	(Myanmar) Lar Din Maw Yar	Hantharwady United	1
11	(Myanmar) Nay Moe Naing	Hantharwady United	1
11	(Myanmar) Kyi Soe	ISPE	1
11	(Myanmar) Kyaw Thiha Zaw	ISPE	1
11	(Myanmar) Htoo Myat Khant	Kachin United	1
11	(Myanmar) Kyaw Win Thein	Kachin United	1
11	(Myanmar) S Gum Lam	Kachin United	1
11	(Cameroon) Patrick Edubat	Mahar United	1
11	(Myanmar) Arkar Kyaw	Mahar United	1
11	(Myanmar) Aung Hlaing Win	Mahar United	1
11	(Myanmar) Kyaw Swar Min	Mahar United	1
11	(Myanmar) Myo Min Phyo	Mahar United	1
11	(Myanmar) Nay Lin Tun	Mahar United	1
11	(Myanmar) Thaw Zin Htwe	Myawady	1
11	(Myanmar) Soe Min Oo	Myawady	1
11	(Myanmar) Min Ko Thu	Myawady	1
11	(Myanmar) Kyaw Zaw Lin	Myawady	1
11	(Myanmar) Thiha Zaw	Myawady	1
11	(Myanmar) Yell Moe Yan	Myawady	1
11	(Myanmar) Thiha Htet Aung	Rakhine United	1
11	(Myanmar) Than Toe Aung	Rakhine United	1
11	(Myanmar) That Tun Aung	Rakhine United	1
11	(Myanmar) Thu Ya	Rakhine United	1
11	(Myanmar) Zaw Zaw Naing	Rakhine United	1
11	(Myanmar) Lin Htet Paing	Rakhine United	1
11	(Myanmar) Khin Kyaw Win	Shan United	1
11	(Myanmar) Thet Paing Htwe	Shan United	1
11	(Myanmar) Thyne Phwet Aung	Yadanarbon	1
11	(Myanmar) Htet Hlaing Min	Yadanarbon	1
11	(Myanmar) Naung Naung Soe	Yadanarbon	1
11	(Myanmar) Yan Kyaw Soe	Yangon United	1
11	(Myanmar) Kaung Htet Soe	Yangon United	1
11	(Myanmar) La Min Htwe	Yangon United	1
11	(Myanmar) Hlaing Bo Bo	Yangon United	1
11	(Myanmar) Zarni Htet	Yangon United	1
11	(Myanmar) Thar Yar Win Htet	Yangon United	1
11	(Ghana) *Habila*	Yangon United	1

=== Most assists ===
As of 17 December 2023.

Rank	Player	Club	Assists
1	(Myanmar) Zaw Win Thein	Yangon United	12
2	(Myanmar) David Htan	Yangon United	10
3	(Ghana) Mark Sekyi	Shan United	8
4	(Myanmar) Nanda Kyaw	Shan United	7
5	(Myanmar) Yar Zar Aung	Ayeyawady United	6
5	(Myanmar) Thet Wai Moe	Myawady	6
5	(Ivory Coast) Alassane Traore	Rakhine United	6
5	(Myanmar) Yan Naing Oo	Yangon United	6
6	(Myanmar) Thurein Tun	ISPE	5
6	(Myanmar) Aye Chan Thar	ISPE	5
6	(Myanmar) Thet Naing	Mahar United	5
6	(Myanmar) Ye Yint Aung	Shan United	5
6	(Guinea) Sekou Sylla	Yangon United	5
7	(Myanmar) Thein Than Win	Dagon Star	4
7	(Myanmar) Min Myat Soe	Dagon Star	4
7	(Myanmar) Maung Maung Win	Dagon Star	4
7	(Myanmar) Maung Maung Soe	Rakhine United	4
7	(Myanmar) ***Myat Kaung Khant ***	Shan United	4
7	(Ivory Coast) Bello	Shan United	4
8	(Myanmar) Aung Naing Win	Ayeyawady United	3
8	(Myanmar) Pyae Sone Lin	Ayeyawady United	3
8	(Myanmar) Wai Lin Aung	Dagon Star	3
8	(Myanmar) Suan Lam Mang	Dagon Star	3
8	(Myanmar) Arkar	Hantharwady United	3
8	(Myanmar) Kyi Soe	ISPE	3
8	(Myanmar) Thein Zaw Thiha	ISPE	3
8	(Myanmar) Hein Zayar Min	Myawady	3
8	(Myanmar) Htet Wai Phyo	Myawady	3
8	(Myanmar) Thu Ya	Rakhine United	3
8	(Myanmar) Zar Nay Ya Thu	Shan United	3
8	(Myanmar) Moe Swe	Yadanarbon	3
8	(Myanmar) Hlaing Bo Bo	Yangon United	3
8	(Myanmar) Htet Phyo Wai	Shan United	3
8	(Myanmar) Yan Kyaw Htwe	Yangon United	3
9	(Myanmar) Aung Thiha	Ayeyawady United	2
9	(Myanmar) Thiha	Ayeyawady United	2
9	(Myanmar) Thet Paing Soe	Dagon Star	2
9	(Myanmar) Dway Ko Ko	GFA	2
9	(Myanmar) Kalep	GFA	2
9	(Myanmar) Myo Zaw Oo	Hantharwady United	2
9	(Myanmar) Soe Kyaw Kyaw	Hantharwady United	2
9	(Myanmar) Paing Thet Ko Ko	Hantharwady United	2
9	(Myanmar) Han Win Aung	Hantharwady United	2
9	(Myanmar) Htet Lin Lin	Hantharwady United	2
9	(Myanmar) Nay Moe Naing	Hantharwady United	2
9	(Myanmar) Moe Swe Aung	ISPE	2
9	(Myanmar) Naing Naing Kyaw	ISPE	2
9	(Ghana) Yaw Kusi	Kachin United	2
9	(Myanmar) Sai Aung	Kachin United	2
9	(Myanmar) Than Toe Aung	Kachin United	2
9	(Ivory Coast) Edubat	Mahar United	2
9	(Myanmar) Kyaw Swar Min	Mahar United	2
9	(Myanmar) Myo Min Phyo	Mahar United	2
9	(Myanmar) Htike Htike Aung	Mahar United	2
9	(Myanmar) Kaung Myat Thu	Mahar United	2
9	(Myanmar) Naing Zin Htet	Myawady	2
9	(Myanmar) Zaw Zaw Naing	Rakhine United	2
9	(Myanmar) Than Kyaw Htay	Rakhine United	2
9	(Japan) Motohiro Kaneshiro	Shan United	2
9	(Myanmar) Myo Ko Tun	Shan United	2
9	(Myanmar) Chit Aye	Yadanarbon	2
9	(Myanmar) Swam Htet	Yadanarbon	2
9	(Myanmar) Nyein Chan Soe	Yadanarbon	2
9	(Myanmar) Ye Lin Htet	Yangon United	2
9	(Myanmar) La Min Htwe	Yangon United	2
9	(Myanmar) Thar Yar Win Htet	Yangon United	2
10	(Myanmar) Nyi Nyi Aung	Ayeyawady United	1
10	(Myanmar) Phyo Thant Ko Ko	Ayeyawady United	1
10	(Myanmar) Aung Min Thu	Ayeyawady United	1
10	(Myanmar) Soe Thurein	Ayeyawady United	1
10	(Myanmar) Kyaw Thiha Zaw	Ayeyawady United	1
10	(Myanmar) Ye Yint Phyo	Ayeyawady United	1
10	(Myanmar) Tun Nyein	Dagon Star	1
10	(Myanmar) Thein Tan	Dagon Star	1
10	(Myanmar) Wai Yan Phyo	Dagon Star	1
10	(Myanmar) Pyae Phyo Wai	Dagon Star	1
10	(Myanmar) Zin Nyi Nyi Aung	Dagon Star	1
10	(Myanmar) Zaw Lin	GFA	1
10	(Myanmar) Wai Yan	GFA	1
10	(Myanmar) Chan Nyein	GFA	1
10	(Myanmar) Myo Min Aung	GFA	1
10	(Myanmar) John Kui Hleih	GFA	1
10	(Myanmar) Bo Bo Naing	GFA	1
10	(Myanmar) Khun Kyaw Zin Hein	Hantharwady United	1
10	(Myanmar) Nay Thu Ya Aung	Hantharwady United	1
10	(Myanmar) Yan Naing Aung	Hantharwady United	1
10	(Myanmar) Aung Myat Thu	Hantharwady United	1
10	(Myanmar) Zin Min Tun	Hantharwady United	1
10	(Myanmar) Khaing Ye Win	ISPE	1
10	(Myanmar) Lan San Aung	ISPE	1
10	(Myanmar) Zar Ni	ISPE	1
10	(Myanmar) Than Toe Aung	ISPE	1
10	(Myanmar) Aung Myo Htwe	ISPE	1
10	(Myanmar) Ar Kar Kyaw	Mahar United	1
10	(Myanmar) Nyein Chan Aung	Mahar United	1
10	(Myanmar) Soe Min Naing	Mahar United	1
10	(Myanmar) Nay Lin Soe	Mahar United	1
10	(Myanmar) A Zin Hmue	Mahar United	1
10	(Myanmar) Thi Ha Zaw	Myawady	1
10	(Myanmar) Than Aung Kyaw	Myawady	1
10	(Myanmar) Kyaw Zaw Lin	Myawady	1
10	(Myanmar) Kyaw Zin Htwe	Myawady	1
10	(Myanmar) Thant Zin Aung	Myawady	1
10	(Myanmar) Thaw Zin Htwe	Myawady	1
10	(Myanmar) Soe Min Oo	Myawady	1
10	(Myanmar) Tun Nanda Oo	Myawady	1
10	(Myanmar) Htet Lin Aung	Myawady	1
10	(Myanmar) Kyaw Win Thein	Kachin United	1
10	(Myanmar) Zaw Moon Aung	Kachin United	1
10	(Myanmar) Nyi Nyi	Kachin United	1
10	(Myanmar) Mung Dan La Tawng	Kachin United	1
10	(Myanmar) Kyaw Win Thein	Kachin United	1
10	(Myanmar) Thet Tun Aung	Rakhine United	1
10	(Myanmar) Aung Mg Mg Myo (GK)	Rakhine United	1
10	(Myanmar) Bo Bo Naing	Rakhine United	1
10	(Myanmar) Soe Min Aung	Rakhine United	1
10	(Myanmar) Aung Kyaw Aye	Rakhine United	1
10	(Myanmar) Kaung Htet Paing	Yadanarbon	1
10	(Myanmar) Hein Nay San	Yadanarbon	1
10	(Myanmar) Thyne Phwet Aung	Yadanarbon	1
10	(Myanmar) Khin Kyaw Win	Shan United	1
10	(Myanmar) Kyaw Zin Phyo	Shan United	1
10	(Myanmar) Lin Htet Soe	Shan United	1
10	(Myanmar) Zin Phyo Aung	Shan United	1
10	(Myanmar) Lin Htet Soe	Shan United	1
10	(Myanmar) Zwe Khant Min	Shan United	1
10	(Myanmar) Zwe Htet Min	Shan United	1
10	(Myanmar) Thu Ya Kyaw	Yadanarbon	1
10	(Myanmar) San Set Naing	Yangon United	1
10	(Myanmar) Yan Kyaw Soe	Yangon United	1
10	(Ghana) *Habila*	Yangon United	1
10	(Colombia) *José Adolfo Valencia*	Yangon United	1

=== Clean sheets ===
As of 18 December 2023.

Rank	Player	Club	Clean sheets
1	(Myanmar) San Set Naing	Yangon United	11
2	(Myanmar) Kyaw Zin Phyo	Shan United	7
3	(Myanmar) Zin Nyi Nyi Aung	Dagon Star	6
3	(Myanmar) Pyae Phyo Aung	Hanthawady United	6
4	(Myanmar) Mung Htoi Aung	Kachin United	5
4	(Myanmar) A Zin Hmue	Mahar United	5
4	(Myanmar) Pyae Phyo Thu	Yadanarbon	5
5	(Myanmar) Aung Myo Htwe	ISPE	4
5	(Myanmar) Chan Nyein Kyaw	Rakhine United	4
6	(Myanmar) Chit Minn Htwe	ISPE	2
6	(Myanmar) Phone Thit Sar Min	Yangon United	2
7	(Myanmar) Hein Htet Soe	Ayeyawady United	1
7	(Myanmar) Pyae Phyo Aung 2	Hanthawady United	1
7	(Myanmar) Htun Nanda Oo	Myawady	1

=== Hat-tricks ===
Player	For	Against	Result	Date
(Myanmar) Win Naing Tun	Yangon United	Chinland	5-0	23 February 2023
(Myanmar) Nyi Nyi Aung	Ayeyawady United	Kachin United	5-3	27 June 2023
(Colombia) José Adolfo Valencia	Yangon United	GFA	9-0	18 July 2023
(Ivory Coast) Bello	Shan United	GFA	6-1	22 October 2023

== Awards ==
=== Monthly awards ===
Month	Coach of the Month		Player of the Month		Reference
Month	Coach	Club	Player	Club	Reference
February	(Myanmar) U Min Tun Lin	Dagon Star	(Myanmar) Win Naing Tun	Yangon United	
March	(Myanmar) U Aung Kyaw Moe	Yadanarbon Fc	(Myanmar) Lin Htet Soe	Shan United	
Jun	(Myanmar) U Chit Naing	ISPE	(Myanmar) Nyi Nyi Aung	Dagon Star	
July	(Myanmar) U Han Win Aung	Shan United	(Colombia) José Adolfo Valencia	Yangon United	
October	(Myanmar) U Myo Min Tun	Hantharwady United	(Ivory Coast) Bello	Shan United	

== Qualification for the 2024–25 AFC Clubs competitions ==
Team	League of qualification	Date of qualification	Qualified to
Shan United	2023 Myanmar National League Champion	18 December 2023	2024–25 AFC Challenge League and 2024–25 ASEAN Club Championship qualifying play-offs Qualifying Round Qualifying Round

== Broadcasters ==
TV broadcasters: Sky Net, Channel 9 Myanmar, MNTV Myanmar, Sky Net Sports channels numbered 1 to 6.

Online streaming: MNL YouTube Channel, MNL-2 YouTube Channel, Genius Sports, Eleven Sports, MyCujoo, AI Soccer, Be Soccer, Sky Net DTH YouTube Channel

== See also ==
- 2024 MNL League Cup
- 2024 MFF Charity Cup
- 2023 MNL-2
- 2023 Myanmar Women's League
- FIFA-MFF U-15 Youth League
- Myanmar Amateur League
