= 2024 MNL League Cup final =

2024 MNL League Cup final.
- Event: MNL League Cup 2024
Shan United	Yangon United
1	0
- Date: 19 June 2024
- Venue: Thuwunna Stadium, Yangon, Yangon
- Man of the Match: Ye Yint Aung (Shan United)
- Referee: Zaw Zaw (Myanmar)
- Attendance: 10,000
- Weather: Light rain 25 °C (77 °F) humidity 93%

The 2024 MNL League Cup Final was the culmination of the 2024 MNL League Cup, Myanmar’s premier domestic knockout football competition organized by the Myanmar National League (MNL). The final was played on 19 June 2024 at the Thuwunna Youth Training Centre Stadium in Yangon, Myanmar, featuring two of the country's most storied football clubs—Shan United and Yangon United.

This high-stakes fixture brought together Shan United, a dominant force from Taunggyi representing the Shan State region, and Yangon United, a traditional powerhouse and one of Myanmar's most successful clubs based in the nation’s commercial capital. Both teams had showcased strong campaigns throughout the tournament, overcoming competitive opposition in the knockout stages to reach the final. Shan United defeated Dagon Port 2–1 after extra time in the semi-finals, while Yangon United earned their place by defeating Yadanarbon FC 3–1.

The final was tightly contested, marked by disciplined defending and strategic play from both sides. Shan United emerged victorious with a 1–0 win, securing their second MNL League Cup title in club history. The decisive goal, scored in the second half, underscored Shan United’s clinical efficiency in crucial moments and their growing reputation for consistent performances in domestic competitions.

The 2024 final served as a compelling showcase of the competitive landscape of modern Myanmar football, emphasizing the league’s ongoing growth and the rising standard of play in national cup competitions.

== Shan United ==
In the semi-final, Shan United faced Dagon Star United at a neutral venue. The match was an intense battle, with both sides creating chances but failing to separate during regular time. The deadlock was broken in extra time, where Shan United scored through Ye Yint Aung, edging past Dagon Star United 2–1 to book their place in the final.

The 2024 final marked Shan United’s second MNL League Cup final appearance, and they capitalized on the opportunity with a narrow 1–0 victory over Yangon United, claiming their second League Cup title.

== Yangon United ==
In the semi-final, Yangon United met Yadanarbon FC, one of their traditional rivals in Myanmar football. The match, played at a neutral venue, saw Yangon deliver a dominant display. A brace from Tetteh and a goal from Yan Kyaw Htwe sealed a convincing 3–1 victory and sent Yangon United into their fifth League Cup final.

Despite their strong run, Yangon United fell short in the final, losing 0–1 to Shan United in a closely contested match.

== Match ==
=== Details ===
19 June 2024
15:30 MST

Shan United	1-0	Yangon United
Ye Yint Aung 38'	Highlight; Full match

Thuwunna Stadium, Yangon
Attendance: 10,000
Referee: U Zaw Zaw

Shan United	Yangon United

GK	13	(Myanmar) Kyaw Zin Phyo
RB	4	(Myanmar) Zwe Htet Min		(substituted off) 67'
CB	25	(Nigeria) William Nyakwe
CB	4	(Myanmar) Thet Hein Soe
LB	5	(Myanmar) Hein Thiha Zaw (c)	(yellow card) 57'
CM	6	(Myanmar) Nanda Kyaw
CM	12	(Ivory Coast) Bakayoko
RW	16	(Myanmar) Lin Htet Soe		(substituted off) 75'
LW	18	(Myanmar) Zin Phyo Aung		(substituted off) 75'
CF	29	(Myanmar) Ye Yint Aung	37'	(substituted off) 75'
CF	7	(Myanmar) Kyaw Ko Ko		(substituted off) 60'
Substitutes:
GK	1	(Myanmar) Pyae Phyo Thu
MF	8	(Myanmar) Thet Paing Htwe		(substituted on) 75'
FW	9	(Japan) Da Silva		(substituted on) 60'
MF	11	(Myanmar) Htet Phyo Wai		(substituted on) 75'
DF	14	(Myanmar) Zar Nay Ya Thu
MF	15	(Myanmar) Aung Wunna Soe		(substituted on) 67'
FW	17	(Myanmar) Kaung Myat Thu
MF	20	(Myanmar) Sa Aung Pyae Ko
MF	22	(Myanmar) Aung Naing Win	(yellow card) 90+4'	(substituted on) 75'
Manager:
(Myanmar) Myo Hlaing Win

GK	75	(Myanmar) Sann Satt Naing
RB	30	(Myanmar) Ye Lin Htet		(substituted off) 45'
CB	32	(Nigeria) Yaya
CB	26	(Myanmar) Thurein Soe
LB	22	(Myanmar) Min Kyaw Khant
CM	41	(Myanmar) Wai Linn Aung	(yellow card) 89'
CM	80	(Nigeria) Aboubakar		(substituted off) 72'
RM	70	(Myanmar) Yan Naing Oo		(substituted off) 72'
LM	4	(Myanmar) David Htan (c)
CF	90	(Guinea) Tetteh
CF	21	(Myanmar) Okkar Naing		(substituted off) 67'
Substitutes:
GK	13	(Myanmar) Thura Kyaw
DF	5	(Myanmar) Kyaw Phyo Wai
MF	7	(Myanmar) Zaw Win Thein		(substituted on) 67'
FW	9	(Myanmar) La Min Htwe		(substituted on) 72'
MF	11	(Myanmar) Nyi Nyi Aung
DF	19	(Myanmar) Zin Ko Htet
FW	23	(Myanmar) Yan Kyaw Htwe	(yellow card) 90+7'	(substituted on) 45'
MF	28	(Myanmar) Thar Yar Win Htet
MF	96	(Myanmar) Hlaing Bo Bo		(substituted on) 72'
Manager:
(Germany) Frank Bernhardt

Man of the match

- (Myanmar) Ye Yint Aung

Match officials

- Assistant referees:
  - (Myanmar) Chit Moe Aye
  - (Myanmar) San Shein Htet
- Fourth official: (Myanmar) Thant Zin Oo
- Match Commissioner: (Myanmar) Kyaw Myo Aung

Match rules

- 90 minutes.
- 30 minutes of extra-time if necessary.
- Penalty shoot-out if scores still level.
- Nine named substitutes.
- Maximum of five substitutions.

=== Statistics ===
Statistic	Shan United	Yangon United
Goals scored	1	0
Possession	41%	59%
Shots on target	3	5
Shots off target	5	2
Corner kicks	1	4
Offsides	1	2
Yellow cards	2	2
Red cards	0	0

== Winner ==
2024 MNL League Cup
Winners
Shan United
Second Title

=== Prizes for winner ===
- A champion trophy.
- Ks.350,000,000/- prize money.

=== Prizes for runners-up ===
- Ks.200,00,000/- prize money.

== Broadcasting rights ==
These matches will be broadcast live on Myanmar television:

Final Round	Shan United vs Yangon United
Free to Air	MRTV-4 & Channel 7
Live Stream	Channel K Myanmar
