= 2024 MNL League Cup =

MNL League Cup

Tournament details
- Country: Myanmar
- City: Yangon
- Venues: Thuwunna; YUSC
- Dates: 1 March 2024 19 June 2024
- Teams: 20

Final positions
- Champions: Shan United (2nd title)
- Runners-up: Yangon United

Tournament statistics
- Matches played: 40
- Goals scored: 167 (4.18 per match)
- Top goal scorer: Kyaw Ko Ko (9 goals)

The 2024 Myanmar National League Cup is the 10th season in a Myanmar's knockout football competition. The Cup name changed from General Aung San Shield. MNL League Cup tournament will held new design format. In the Myanmar National League Cup 2024 football tournament, all MNL-1 and MNL-2 clubs included and four group of five clubs will be drawn. Every Group will play Two Round Robin system and the Group winner (4 clubs) will advance to Semi-final. Semi-final and Final are played as a single match.

== Match drawing ==
The drawing-lot event for the Myanmar National League Cup 2024 football tournament, which will see the competition of the domestic football clubs on the eve of the new MNL football season, was held on 15 February at the meeting hall of Thuwunna Stadium. Shan United, Yangon United, Hanthawaddy United and ISPE are placed in Seeding 1 because of top four teams in 2023 Myanmar National League title.

== Calendar ==
Round	Date	Matches	Clubs	New entries this round
Group Stage first-round	1 March - 6 April 2024	40	20	MNL-1 & MNL-2
Group Stage second-round	25 April - 21 May 2024	40	20	MNL-1 & MNL-2
Semi-finals	25–26 May 2024	2	4 → 2	MNL-1
Final	19 June 2024	1	2 → Champions	MNL-1
Total				20 clubs

== Foreign players ==
=== Foreign players ===
Players name in bold indicates the player was registered during the mid-season transfer window.

Club	Player 1	Player 2	Player 3	Player 4	Player 5	Asia Player 6	Former Players
Ayeyawady United							
Dagon Port	(Ghana) Yaw Kusi	(Cameroon) Ghislain Mogou					
Dagon Star United							
Hanthawaddy United							
Shwe Pyi Thar United							
I.S.P.E F.C.							
Mahar United	(Cameroon) Patrick Edubat						
Glory Goal Fc							
Silver stars Fc							
Myawady F.C.							
Rakhine United	(Ivory Coast) Kekere Moukailou	(Cameroon) Effa Alexisi Smael			(Japan) Hiroya		
Rakhapura United							
Rainbow Fc							
Shan United	(Ghana) Mark Sekyi	(Cameroon) Boyomo Boundoma	(Japan) Motoshiro Kaneshiro			(Philippines) (Japan) Sakiao Koichi	
Kachin United							
Thitsar Arman Fc							
Yadanarbon							
GFA Fc							
Yangon United	(Ghana) Gideon Tetteh	(Burkina Faso) Guiro Yaya	(Ghana) Yakubu Abubakar	(Mali) Emmanuel Sanogo			
University							

== Group Stage ==
=== Group (A) ===
Pos	Team	Pld	W	D	L	GF	GA	GD	Pts	Qualification
1	Yangon United	8	8	0	0	30	2	+28	24	advance to Semi-final
2	Mahar United	8	5	0	3	26	12	+14	15	
3	University	8	3	0	5	17	23	−6	9	
4	GFA	8	3	0	5	13	21	−8	9	
5	Shwe Pyi Thar United	8	1	0	7	13	41	−28	3	

Source: Flashscore

=== week (1) ===
1 March 2024
16:00 UTC+6:30

Yangon United	7-0	Shwe Pyi Thar United
Tetteh 11', 21'; Yaya 30'; Sanogo 43'; La Min Htwe 65', 75'; Thar Yar Win Htet 78'

Thuwunna Stadium, Yangon
1 March 2024
15:30 UTC+6:30

University	2-4	Mahar United
Than Myat Soe 53' (pen.); Hlaing Bwar 89'		Edubat 9', 35', 47'; Aung Hlaing Win 65'

University Stadium, Yangon

=== week(2) ===
5 March 2024
16:00 UTC+6:30

Yangon United	4-0	University
Sanogo 4'; Tetteh 15'; Lamin Htwe 90'; Oakkar Naing 90+4'

Thuwunna Stadium, Yangon
5 March 2024
16:00 15:30

Shwe Pyi Thar United	3-4	GFA
Nyan Min Htet 21'; Kyaw Chu 76'; Phoe Chit 88'		Kyaw Win 45+1'; John Kui Helieh 59'; Kyaw Swar Htet 74'; Yar Zar Myo 90+3'

Padonmar, Yangon

=== week (3) ===
9 March 2024
15:30 UTC+6:30

Mahar United	3-0	GFA
Toe Sat Naing 15'; Nay Lin Soe 76'; Thet Naing Oo 90+2'

University Stadium, Yangon
9 March 2024
15:30 UTC+6:30

Shwe Pyi Thar United	2-3	University
Thet Lwin Win 27' (pen.); Han Aye Nyein 71' (o.g.)		Shine Htet Aung 68'; Zaw Zaw Hteik 80', 88'

Y.U.S.C Stadium, Yangon

=== Week (4) ===
31 March 2024
15:30 UTC+6:30

Yangon United	3-0	GFA FC
Tetteh 18'; Wai Lin Aung 59', 71'

Y.U.S.C Stadium, Yangon
31 March 2024
15:30 UTC+6:30

Shwe Pyi Thar United	1-8	Mahar United

Padonmar Stadium, Yangon

=== week (5) ===
5 April 2024
15:30 UTC+6:30

University	0-2	GFA Fc

Y.U.S.C Stadium, Yangon
5 April 2024
15:30 UTC+6:30

Mahar United	0-3	Yangon United
		Yan Naing Oo 63'; La Min Htwe 78'; Nyi Nyi Aung 87'

University Stadium, Yangon

=== week (6) ===
25 April 2024
15:30 UTC+6:30

Shwe Pyi Thar United	0-3	Yangon United
		Yan Naing Oo 15'; Zin Ko Htet 45+1'; Nyan Lin Htet 72'

Y.U.S.C Stadium, Yangon
25 April 2024
16:00 UTC+6:30

Mahar United	5-2	University
Edubat 5', 56'; Kyaw Swar Min 7'; Aung Hlaing Win 44'; Khant Zin Hein 76'		Myo Myint Aung 36'; Aung Myint Myat 77'

Thuwunna Stadium, Yangon

=== week (7) ===
1 May 2024
15:30 UTC+6:30

GFA Fc	5-6	Shwe Pyi Thar united

Y.U.S.C Stadium, Yangon
1 May 2024
16:00 UTC+6:30

University	1-4	Yangon United
Aung Myint Myat 20'		Tetteh 9'; Yan Kyaw Htwe 49', 62' , 74'

Thuwunna Stadium, Yangon

=== week (8) ===
7 May 2024
16:00 UTC+6:30

GFA Fc	1-0	Mahar United

Thuwunna Stadium, Yangon
7 May 2024
15:30 UTC+6:30

University	6-1	Shwe Pyi Thar United

University Stadium, Yangon

=== week (9) ===
13 May 2024
16:00 UTC+6:30

GFA Fc	0-3	Yangon United
		Hein Zayar Linn 12'; Yan Kyaw Htwe 45+1'; Lamin Htwe 86'

Thuwunna Stadium, Yangon
13 May 2024
15:30 UTC+6:30

Mahar United	5-0	Shwe Pyi Thar United
Aung Hlaing Win 38'; Chit Myo Hteik 50' (pen.), 90'; Txmu Pong Aum 56'; Arkar Kyaw 64'

University Stadium, Yangon

=== week (10) ===
19 May 2024
15:30 UTC+6:30

GFA Fc	1-3	University
Hla Phone Oo 28'		Nyein Zayar 62'; Hlaing Bwar 66'; Zaw Zaw Hteik 81'

Padonmar Stadium, Yangon
19 May 2024
16:00 UTC+6:30

Yangon United	3-1	Mahar United
Okkar Naing 4'; Yan Naing Oo 33'; Zaw Win Thein 66'		Edubat 27' (pen.)

Thuwunna Stadium, Yangon

=== Group (B) ===
Pos	Team	Pld	W	D	L	GF	GA	GD	Pts	Qualification
1	Shan United	8	7	0	1	29	3	+26	21	advance to Semi-final
2	Rakhine United	8	6	0	2	29	6	+23	18	
3	Kachin United	8	4	1	3	17	14	+3	13	
4	Glory Goal	8	2	1	5	6	21	−15	7	
5	Rainbow	8	0	0	8	3	40	−37	0	

Source: Flashscore

=== week (1) ===
1 March 2024
16:00 UTC+6:30

Shan United	4-0	Rainbow
Htet Phyo Wai 65'; Ye Yint Aung 68'; Thu Rein Tun 83'; Mark Sekyi 90+1'

YUSC Stadium, Yangon
1 March 2024
15:30 UTC+6:30

Glory Goal	0-3	Rakhine United
		Min Khant Kyaw 16'; Aung Kyaw Myo 34' (o.g.); Thiha Htet Aung 90'

Padonmar Stadium, Yangon

=== week (2) ===
5 March 2024
15:30 UTC+6:30

Rainbow Fc	0-3	Kachin United
		Lan San Aung 21', 59', 63'

University Stadium, Yangon
5 March 2024
15:30 UTC+6:30

Shan United	5-0	Glory Goal
Ye Yint Aung 10'; Mark Sekyi 21'; Sa Aung Pyae Ko 20', 43' (pen.); Thet Wai Moe 56'

Y.U.S.C Stadium, Yangon

=== Week (3) ===
9 March 2024
15:30 UTC+6:30

Rakhine united	1-2	Kachin united
Traore 68' (pen.)		Zaw Lin OO 35'; Kyaw Zin Oo 45+1'

Padonmar Stadium, Yangon
9 March 2024
16:00 UTC+6:30

Rainbow Fc	0-3	Glory Goal
		Htet Myat Lwin 64'; Chit Htwe 67'; Ye Kaung Satt 85'

Thuwunna Stadium, Yangon

=== Week (4) ===
31 March 2024
16:00 UTC+6:30

Shan united	5-0	Kachin United
Khun Kyaw Zin Hein 3'; Sa AUng Pyae Ko 30'; Kaneshiro 38'; Ye Yint Aung 69'; Aung Naing Win 87'

Thuwunna Stadium, Yangon
31 March 2024
15:30 UTC+6:30

Rainbow Fc	2-11	Rakhine United
San Myint Naing 21' (pen.), 76'		Than Kyaw Htay 11', 19'; Kaung Sithu 28', 30'; Kyaw Ko Ko 33', 35', 45+1', 90'; Kyi Lin 37'; Min Khant Kyaw 73'; Moukailou 81' (pen.)

University Stadium, Yangon

=== week (5) ===
5 April 2024
15:30 UTC+6:30

Glory Goal	0-5	Kachin United
		Zaw Lin Oo 60'; Zaw Moon AUng 65'; S Gum Lung 82', 85', 90+2' (pen.)

Padonmar Stadium, Yangon
5 April 2024
16:00 UTC+6:30

Rakhine United	2-1	Shan united
Kaung Sithu 23'; Traore 81' (pen.)		Zar Nay Ya Thu 90'

Thuwunna Stadium, Yangon

=== week (6) ===
26 April 2024
15:30 UTC+6:30

Rainbow Fc	0-7	Shan united
		Nanda Kyaw 20'; Htet Phyo Wai 34'; Thurein Tun 45'; Motohiro 49', 56', 67'; Sa AUng Pyae Ko 88'

Padonmar Stadium, Yangon
26 April 2024
16:00 UTC+6:30

Rakhine united	2-0	Glory Goal
Kyaw Ko Ko 54', 76'

Thuwunna Stadium, Yangon

=== week (7) ===
2 May 2024
15:30 UTC+6:30

Kachin united	5-0	Rainbow Fc

Y.U.S.C Stadium, Yangon
2 May 2024
15:30 UTC+6:30

Glory Goal	0-4	Shan united

Thuwunna Stadium, Yangon

=== week (8) ===
8 May 2024
15:30 UTC+6:30

Kachin united	0-5	Rakhine united

Y.U.S.C Stadium, Yangon
8 May 2024
16:00 UTC+6:30

Glory Goal	2-1	Rainbow Fc

Thuwunna Stadium, Yangon

=== week (9) ===
14 May 2024
16:00 UTC+6:30

Kachin united	1-2	Shan united
Zaw Moon Aung 76'		Ye Yint Aung 12'; Kaung Myat Thu 39'

Thuwunna Stadium, Yangon
14 May 2024
15:30 UTC+6:30

Rakhine united	5-0	Rainbow Fc
Kyaw Ko Ko 45+3'; Aung Thant Zaw 28'; Zaw win Maung 49'; Thant Kyaw Htay 85'; Aung Kyaw Aye 90+3'

Y.U.S.C Stadium, Yangon

=== week (10) ===
20 May 2024
15:30 UTC+6:30

Kachin united	1-1	Glory Goal
Than Zaw Hein 90+1'		Phoo Khant Kyaw 83'

Y.U.S.C Stadium, Yangon
20 May 2024
16:00 UTC+6:30

Shan united	1-0	Rakine united
Bakayoko 10'

Thuwunna Stadium, Yangon

==== Group C ====
Team	Pld	W	D	L	GF	GA	GD	Pts
Dagon Star United	8	6	2	0	20	5	15	20
Hanthawaddy United	8	5	1	2	22	10	12	16
Ayeyawady United	8	4	1	3	15	23	-8	13
Dagon Port	8	2	2	4	18	12	6	8
Silver Stars	8	0	0	8	3	46	-43	0

=== week (1) ===
2 March 2024
15:30 UTC+6:30

Hanthawady United	7-1	Silver Star
Lar Din Maw Yar 19'; Nay Moe Naing 32'; Han Win Aung 43'; Soe Kyaw Kyaw 45'; Chit Hla Aung 51'; Aung Myat Thu 55'; Lat Wai Bhone 59'		Kyaw Phyo Oo 53'

YUSC Stadium, Yangon
2 March 2024
15:30 UTC+6:30

Dagon Port	0-1	Dagon Star United
		Wai Yan Phyo 84'

Padonmar Stadium, Yangon

=== week (2) ===
6 March 2024
15:30 UTC+6:30

Silver stars	0-4	Ayeyawady United
		Chan Nyein 4'; Nan Hteik Zaw 11' (pen.); Aung Min Thu 32'; Aung Pyae Phyo 67'

University Stadium, Yangon
6 March 2024
16:00 UTC+6:30

Hantharwady United	2-1	Dagon Port Fc
Zin Min Tun 85', 87'		Ti Nyein Min 25'

Thuwunna Stadium, Yangon

=== week (3) ===
10 March 2024
15:30 UTC+6:30

Dagon star	3-2	Ayeyawady United
Swan Htet 46'; Peter Aung Wai Htoo 52'; Nyi Nyi 60'		Nan Hteik Zaw 4'; Yan Paing Soe 90+5'

Padonmar Stadium, Yangon
2024
15:30 UTC+6:30

Silver stars	0-4	Dagon Port
		Aung Kyaw Thu 42'; Ti Nyein Min 52' (pen.); Myo Sett Paing 60'; Kaung Myat Kyaw 72'

Y.U.S.C Stadium, Yangon

=== week (4) ===
1 April 2024
15:30 UTC+6:30

Hantharwady United	0-1	Ayeyawady United
		Yar Zar Aung 10'

University Stadium, Yangon
1 April 2024
15:30 UTC+6:30

Silver stars	1-9	Dagon stars
Thet Win Tun 65'		Thura Min Naing 2'; Thet Paing Soe 27'; Wai Yan Phyo 56'; Zay Yar Niang 63'; Peter Aung Wai Htoo 67', 75'; Myo Zaw Oo 69'; Lin Lin Aung 81', 83'

Y.U.S.C Stadium, Yangon

=== week (5) ===
6 April 2024
15:30 UTC+6:30

Dagon Port	1-2	Ayeyawady United
Mogou 35'		Yar Zar Aung 69'; Chin Nyein 77'

University Stadium, Yangon
6 April 2024
16:00 UTC+6:30

Dagon stars	4-1	Hantharwady United
Maung Maung Win 10'; Peter Aung Wai Htoo 36'; Kyaw Zin Lwin 84'; Swan Htet 90+3'

Thuwunna Stadium, Yangon

=== week (6) ===
27 April 2024
16:00 UTC+6:30

Silver stars	0-6	Hantharwady United
		Aung Myo Htwe (1) 13', 84'; Than Toe Aung 70'; Kaung Htet Aung 72'; Zwe Man Thar 86'; Nay Moe Naing 90+3'

Thuwunna Stadium, Yangon
27 April 2024
15:30 UTC+6:30

Dagon stars	1-1	Dagon Port
Zaw Ye Tun 73'		Mogou 38'

University Stadium, Yangon

=== week (7) ===
3 May 2024
16:00 UTC+6:30

Ayeyawady United	6-1	Silver stars

Thuwunna Stadium, Yangon
3 May 2024
15:30 UTC+6:30

Dagon Port	2-4	Hantharwady United

University Stadium, Yangon

=== week (8) ===
9 May 2024
15:30 UTC+6:30

Ayeyawady United	0-1	Dagon Stars
		Myo Zaw Oo 33'

Padonmar Stadium, Yangon
9 May 2024
15:30 UTC+6:30

Dagon Port	9-0	Silver stars

University Stadium, Yangon

=== week (9) ===
15 May 2024
15:30 UTC+6:30

Ayeyawady united	1-2	Hantharwady United
Aung Pyae Phyo 88'		Kaung Htet Aung 45+1'; Aung Myat Thu 48'

Y.U.S.C Stadium, Yangon
15 May 2024
15:30 UTC+6:30

Dagon stars	1-0	Silver stars
Thet Paing Htoo 19'

University Stadium, Yangon

=== week (10) ===
21 May 2024
15:30 UTC+6:30

Ayeyawady united	1-1	Dagon Port
Aung Pyae Phyo 47'		Nyein Chan 64'

Padonmar Stadium, Yangon
21 May 2024
15:30 UTC+6:30

Hantharwady United	0-0	Dagon stars

Y.U.S.C Stadium, Yangon

=== Group D ===
Pos	Team	Pld	W	D	L	GF	GA	GD	Pts	Qualification
1	Yadanarbon	8	5	1	2	18	8	+10	16	advance to Semi-final
2	ISPE	8	4	3	1	19	10	+9	15	
3	Thitsar Arman	8	4	2	2	16	12	+4	14	
4	Myawady	8	3	1	4	11	15	−4	10	
5	Rakhapura United	8	0	1	7	6	25	−19	1	

Updated to match(es) played on 15 May 2024. Source: Flashscore

=== week (1) ===
2 March 2024
16:00 UTC+6:30

ISPE	0-0	Rakhapura United

Thuwunna Stadium, Yangon
2 March 2024
15:30 UTC+6:30

Thitsar Arman	1-1	Myawady
Naing Win Tun 9'		Aung Thu 27' (pen.)

University Stadium, Yangon

=== week (2) ===
6 March 2024
15:30 UTC+6:30

Rakhapura United	0-5	Yadanarbon Fc
		Kyi Soe 9', 45+2'; Khin Kyaw Win 56'; Arkar 66'; Soe Min Oo 75'

Padonmar Stadium, Yangon
2024
15:30 UTC+6:30

ISPE Fc	2-1	Thitsar Arman Fc
Saw Sae Ka Paw Say 6'; Thein Zaw Thiha 12'		Pyae Sone Aung 33'

Y.U.S.C Stadium, Yangon

=== week (3) ===
10 March 2024
15:30 UTC+6:30

Myawady	0-2	Yadanarbon
		Soe Min Oo 26'; Khin Kyaw Win 63'

University Stadium, Yangon
10 March 2024
16:00 UTC+6:30

Rakhapura United	1-2	Thitsar Arman
Conde 51' (pen.)		Aung Tun Tun 42'; Shine Wunna Aung 77'

Thuwunna Stadium, Yangon

=== week (4) ===
1 April 2024
16:00 UTC+6:30

ISPE	2-0	Yadanarbon
Win Pyae Maung 90+1', 90+4'

Thuwunna Stadium, Yangon
1 April 2024
15:30 UTC+6:30

Rakhapura United	0-1	Myawady
		Naing Zin Htet 90+1'

Padonmar Stadium, Yangon

=== week (5) ===
6 April 2024
15:30 UTC+6:30

Thitsar Arman	1-2	Yadanarbon
Saw Myo Zaw 85'		Khin Kyaw Win 38'; Moe Swe 52'

Padonmar Stadium, Yangon
6 April 2024
15:30 UTC+6:30

Myawady	1-4	ISPE
Kaung Htet Lin 63'		Win Pyae Maung 13'; Naing Naing Kyaw 33'; Saw Sae Ka Paw Say 55'; Than Toe Aung 67' (pen.)

Y.U.S.C Stadium, Yangon

=== week (6) ===
28 April 2024
15:30 UTC+6:30

Rakhapura United	1-6	ISPE
Amara Kamara 90+4'		Win Pyae Maung 1', 45+3'; Than Toe Aung 16'; Naing Naing Kyaw 45+1'; Ba Nyar Thein 76'; Thein Zaw Thiha 89' (pen.)

University Stadium, Yangon
28 April 2024
15:30 UTC+6:30

Myawady	2-4	Thitsar Arman
Kaung Sithu 56'; Kaung Htet Lin 62'		Saw Myo Zaw 6'; Naing Win Tun 16', 31'; Min Maw Oo 17'

Padonmar Stadium, Yangon

=== week (7) ===
3 May 2024
15:30 UTC+6:30

Yadanarbon Fc	5-1	Rakhapura united

Padonmar Stadium, Yangon
3 May 2024
15:30 UTC+6:30

Thitsar arman Fc	3-3	Ispe Fc

Y.U.S.C Stadium, Yangon

=== Week (8) ===
9 May 2024
16:00 UTC+6:30

Yadanarbon Fc	1-0	Myawady Fc
Soe Min Oo 51'

Thuwunna Stadium, Yangon
2024
15:30 UTC+6:30

Thitsar arman Fc	2-0	Rakhapura United
Saw Myo Zaw 63'; Pyae Sone aung 90+2' (pen.)

Y.U.S.C Stadium, Yangon

=== week (9) ===
15 May 2024
15:30 UTC+6:30

Yadanarbon Fc	2–2	ISPE
Sitt Mone 4', 78'		Naing Naing Kyaw 41'; Toe Aung Than 83'

Padonmar Stadium, Yangon
15 May 2024
16:00 UTC+6:30

Myawady	4-3	Rakhapura United
Kaung Htet Lin 47'; Kaung Sithu 50', 81', 88'		Mang Deih Pau 27'; Maung Maung Soe 53'; Kamara 74'

Thuwunna Stadium, Yangon

=== week (10) ===
21 May 2024
15:30 UTC+6:30

Yadanarbon Fc	1-2	Thitsar arman
Arkar 72'		Aung Kyaw Hein 6'; Pyae Sone Aung 86'

University Stadium, Yangon
21 May 2024
16:00 UTC+6:30

ISPE	0-2	Myawady
		Kaung Sithu 17'; Thant Zin Aung 78'

Thuwunna Stadium, Yangon

== Knockout stage ==
=== Semi-finals ===
The semi-finals would be featured 4 clubs that were the winners of the each groups,

25 May 2024	Yangon United	3-1	Yadanarbon	Thuwunna Stadium, Yangon
16:00 (UTC+6:30)	Gideon Tetteh 10', 69'; Yan Kyaw Htwe 76'		Sitt Mone 20'

26 May 2024	Shan United	2-1 (e.a.t)	Dagon Star United	Thuwunna Stadium, Yangon
16:00 (UTC+6:30)	Nanda Kyaw 82'; Ye Yint Aung 120+2'		Petar Aung Wai Htoo 27'

==== Final ====
The final would be featured 2 clubs that were the winners of the semi-finals.

19 June 2024	Yangon United	0-1	Shan United	Thuwunna Stadium, Yangon
16:00 (UTC+6:30)			Ye Yint Aung 37'	Referee: Zaw Zaw; Assistant referees: Chit Moe Aye, San Shein Htet; Fourth official: Thant Zin Oo

Myanmar National League Cup
2024 winners

2nd title

== Season statistics ==
=== Top goalscorers ===
26 May 2024 MMT 18:45

Rank	Player	Club	Goals
1	(Myanmar) Kyaw Ko Ko	Rakhine United	9
2	(Cameroon) Patrick Eduba	Mahar United	7
2	(Ghana) Gideon Tetteh	Yangon United	7
4	(Myanmar) Ye Yint Aung	Shan United	6

=== Hat-tricks ===
Player	For	Against	Result	Date
(Cameroon) Patrick Eduba	Mahar United	University	2-4	1 March 2024
(Myanmar) Lan San Aung	Kachin United	Rainbow Fc	0-3	5 March 2024
(Myanmar) Kyaw Ko Ko	Rakhine United	Rainbow Fc	1-8	31 March 2024
(Japan) Kaneshiro Motoshiro	Shan United	Rainbow Fc	0-7	26 April 2024
(Myanmar) Yan Kyaw Htwe	Yangon United	University	1-4	1 May 2024
(Myanmar) Phyo Nay Ko Hlaing	Shwe Pyi Thar Fc	GFA	5-6	1 May 2024
(Myanmar) Hla Phone Oo	GFA	Shwe Pyi Thar Fc	5-6	1 May 2024
(Myanmar) Zaw Moon Aung	Kachin United	Rainbow Fc	5-0	2 May 2024

== Sponsor ==
=== Official Partner ===
- AYA Bank
- AYA Pay

=== TV broadcasters ===
- Channel K Myanmar

=== Co-sponsor ===
- Alpine
- Five Star
- Max Energy
- Yangon Fitness
- Aya SOMPO
- Genius Sport
- Max Cement

=== Ball sponsor ===
- Dong Luc

=== Kit Sponsor ===
- M21

== Qualification for the 2025–26 AFC Clubs competitions ==
Team	League of qualification	Date of qualification	Qualified to
Shan United	[[2024 Myanmar National League Champion]]	28 February 2025	2025–26 AFC Challenge League Qualifying Round
Shan United	[[2024 Myanmar National League Cup Champion]]	19 June 2024	2025–26 ASEAN Club Championship qualifying play-offs Qualifying Round

== See also ==
- 2024 Myanmar National League
- Myanmar National League Cup
- MNL-2
- 2024 Myanmar Women's League
