= Manaw F.C. =

Manaw မနော
- Full name: Manaw Football Club
- Founded: 2014; 12 years ago
- Ground: Myitkyina Stadium
- Capacity: 4,000
- Head coach: U Si Thu Aung
- League: MNL-2
- 2025-26: MNL-2, 5th of 8
Home colours	Away colours

Manaw Football Club (Burmese: မနော ဘောလုံးအသင်း) is a Burmese football club based in Myitkyina township, Kachin and founded in 2014. At first, they played under the name Pong Gan FC. In 2018, the name changed to Kachin United Football Club. In 2022, Dagon Star United and Kachin United were nominated for the 2023 Myanmar National League.

== Rebranding ==
For 2026-27 M League 2, Kachin United changed their name to Manaw FC.

== 2026-27 squad list ==
As of October 2026

Note: Flags indicate national team as defined under FIFA eligibility rules; some limited exceptions apply. Players may hold more than one non-FIFA nationality.

No.	Pos.	Nation	Player
1	GK	MYA	Maran Brang Bawk Lar
4	DF	MYA	Thike Shwe San
5	DF	MYA	Oak Thar
7	FW	MYA	Maran Ja Kun
10	MF	MYA	Naw Li Zar
11	MF	MYA	Nay Dunn
12	DF	MYA	Isak
13	DF	MYA	Mung Dan La Tawng
14	MF	MYA	Khai Pu
17	MF	MYA	Seng Du Awng
18	FW	MYA	David
19	FW	MYA	Min Soe Than
20	MF	MYA	Paing Thet Phyo
21	MF	MYA	Kyang Ting
22	DF	MYA	Seng Naw Lat

No.	Pos.	Nation	Player
23	DF	MYA	Myo Wai Lin
27	MF	MYA	Zayar Naing
34	MF	MYA	Chit Ko Ko Naing
41	MF	MYA	Lum Hawng
44	DF	MYA	Zawng Hkawng
47	DF	MYA	Phyo Wai Lin
70	GK	MYA	Saw Ka Lo Muee
82	DF	MYA	Htoi Jan Awng
83	MF	MYA	Phyo Khant Kyaw
85	GK	MYA	Myint Myat Aung
86	MF	GHA	Yaw Kusi
87	MF	GHA	Addaph Joseph
