= Maung Maung Win =

Burmese footballer (born 1994)

Personal information
- Full name: Maung Maung Win
- Date of birth: 8 May 1990 (age 36)
- Place of birth: Maungdaw, Rakhine State, Myanmar
- Height: 1.62 m (5 ft 4 in)
- Position: Midfielder

Team information
- Current team: Dagon Star
- Number: 6

Senior career*
Years	Team	Apps	(Gls)
2009–2010	Magwe		
2011–2012	Zeyar Shwe Myay		
2013–2014	Rakhine United		
2015–2017	GFA	18	(2)
2018–2019	Zwekapin United	39	(1)
2019–2022	Yangon United	20	(4)
2023–	Dagon Star	1	

International career^{‡}
2018–	Myanmar	5	(0)
- * Club domestic league appearances and goals as of 4 October 2019 ‡ National team caps and goals as of 15 June 2021

Maung Maung Win (Burmese: မောင်မောင်ဝင်း; born 8 December 1994) is a footballer from Myanmar who plays as a midfielder for Yangon United and the Myanmar national team. He is of ethnic Rakhine descent.

== International ==
As of match played 6 June 2019

Appearances and goals by national team and year
National team	Year	Apps	Goals
Myanmar	2019	2	0
Total		2	0
