= Aung Naing Win =

Burmese footballer

Personal information
- Full name: Aung Naing Win
- Date of birth: 1 June 1997 (age 29)
- Place of birth: Myanmar
- Height: 1.75 m (5 ft 9 in)
- Position: Defensive midfielder

Team information
- Current team: Rakhine United F.C.
- Number: 13

Youth career
- 2013–2014: Mandalay I.S.P.E

Senior career*
Years	Team	Apps	(Gls)
2018–2020	Yadanarbon	64	(0)
2022–2023	Ayeyawady United	29	(1)
2024–2025	Shan United		

International career
2022–	Myanmar	8	(0)
- * Club domestic league appearances and goals

Aung Naing Win (Burmese: အောင်နိုင်ဝင်း; born 1 June 1997) is a Burmese professional footballer who plays as a defensive midfielder.

== International ==
As of match played 30 December 2022

Appearances and goals by year
National team	Year	Apps	Goals
Myanmar	2022	7	0
Myanmar	2023	1	0
Total		8	0
