= Soe Kyaw Kyaw =

Burmese footballer

Personal information
- Full name: Soe Kyaw Kyaw
- Date of birth: 16 February 1991 (age 35)
- Place of birth: Myanmar
- Height: 1.75 m (5 ft 9 in)
- Position: Striker

Team information
- Current team: Yadanarbon
- Number: 27

Senior career*
Years	Team	Apps	(Gls)
2012–2013	Yadanarbon		
2013–2019	Ayeyawady United		
2022–2024	Hanthawaddy United	24	(8)

International career^{‡}
2012	Myanmar	3	(1)
- * Club domestic league appearances and goals as of 26 June 2022 ‡ National team caps and goals as of 2 July 2013

Soe Kyaw Kyaw (Burmese: စိုးကျော်ကျော်; born 16 February 1991) is a Burmese footballer who plays as a striker for the Myanmar national football team and Ayeyawady United.

== Club career ==
He currently plays for Ayeyawady United in Myanmar National League.
