= Zaw Win Thein =

Burmese footballer (born 2003)

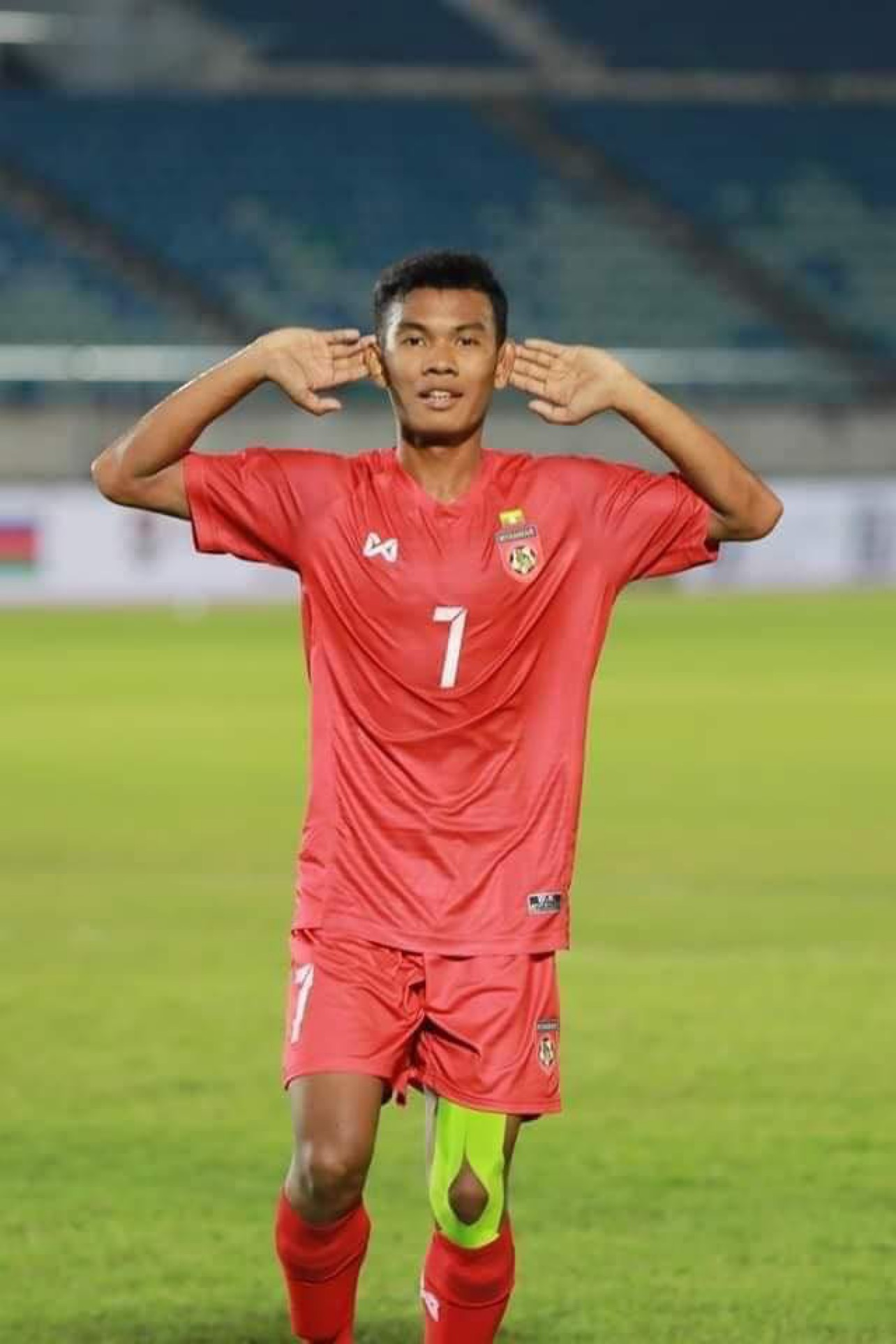
- Zaw Win Thein with Myanmar U-19

Personal information
- Full name: Zaw Win Thein
- Date of birth: 1 March 2003 (age 23)
- Place of birth: North Dagon, Myanmar
- Height: 1.67 m (5 ft 6 in)
- Position: Attacking midfielder

Team information
- Current team: Yangon United
- Number: 7

Senior career*
Years	Team	Apps	(Gls)
2019–2020	Junior Lions	7	(5)
2020–	Yangon United	49	(8)

International career^{‡}
2014	Myanmar U14	4	(0)
2017	Myanmar U16	8	(0)
2018–2019	Myanmar U19	14	(4)
2020–2026	Myanmar U23	42	(1)
2022–	Myanmar	25	(1)
- * Club domestic league appearances and goals as of 28 July 2023 ‡ National team caps and goals as of 28 July 2026

Zaw Win Thein (Burmese: ဇော်ဝင်းသိန်း, born 1 March 2003) is a Burmese professional footballer who plays as an attacking midfielder for Myanmar National League club Yangon United and the Myanmar national team.

== Early life ==
Zaw Win Thein was born in Yangon and joined Mandalay Football Academy for two years since 2014 and has been selected for the Myanmar National Team aged group since 2016 for five consecutive years.

== Youth career ==
- Mandalay football academy 2014–2015

== Club career ==
=== Yangon United ===
On 16 August 2023, Zaw Win Thein scored an injury time winner goal against Brunei DPMM to send his club to the 2023–24 AFC Cup play-offs round which will see them face Indonesia side, PSM Makassar.

== Style of play ==
He is a midfielder with good defensive contribution which is balanced by his offensive abilities as center midfield.

== Career statistics ==
As of match played 29 November 2023

Yangon United
2020	10	0	1
2022	18	4	2
2023	21	5	14
Total	49	9	17

== International career ==
- Myanmar U14–2014
- Myanmar U16–2017
- Myanmar U19–2018–2019
- Myanmar U23 – 2020–

He won the Champions Trophy in Hong Kong Jockey Club International Football Tournament and was the most valuable player award of the tournament. Besides, his team placed second in the CTFA U-19 International Tournament 2019, fourth in AFF U-18 Championship 2019, and third place in U-20 BTV Cup 2019.

He was one of the players of Junior Lions which participated in the Myanmar National Youth (U-21) team in 2019 and crowned the Champions Trophy and half-season champions in Myanmar National League-2 in 2020.

=== International ===
As of match played 28 July 2026

Age First Cap:

- ( 19 years 7 months 26 days 27-5-2022 vs. Bahrain 0-2 )

Myanmar national team
2022	4	0	0
2023	6	0	0
2024	8	0	1
2025	3	0	0
2026	4	1	0
Total	25	1	1

List of international goals scored by Zaw Win Thein
No.	Date	Venue	Opponent	Score	Result	Competition
1.	6 June 2026	Rizal Memorial Stadium, Manila, Philippines	Guam	5–0	6–1	Friendly

== Honours ==
=== International ===
Tri-Nation Series (India)

- Runners-up (1):2023

==== Junior Lions ====
Gold medal: 2019 Myanmar National League U-21

==== U-19 ====
- Gold medal: 2019 Jockey Club International Youth Invitational Football Tournament 2019, Hong Kong
- Silver medal: CTFA U-19 International Tournament 2019

==== U-23 National Football Team ====
- Bronze medal: 2019 BTV Cup

=== Club ===
==== Yangon United ====
- Silver medal : 2022 Myanmar National League
